= 2012 PDC Pro Tour =

Darts tour

The 2012 PDC Pro Tour was a series of non-televised darts tournaments organised by the Professional Darts Corporation (PDC). They were the Professional Dart Players Association (PDPA) Players Championships, the UK Open Qualifiers, and the new European Tour events. This year there were 33 PDC Pro Tour events – 20 Players Championships, 8 UK Open Qualifiers, and 5 European Tour events.

== Prize money ==
Prize money for each Players Championship and UK Open Qualifier is £34,600, unchanged from 2011. Prize money for each European Tour event was £82,100.

Stage	ET	PC/UKQ	YT
Winner	£15,000	£6,000	£500
Runner-up	£7,500	£3,000	£300
Semi-finalists	£5,000	£2,000	£200
Quarter-finalists	£3,000	£1,000	£100
Last 16	£1,500	£600	£75
Last 32	£1,000	£400	£50
Last 64	£200	£200	N/A
Total	£82,100	£34,600	£3,000

In addition, the 32 players who failed to qualify for a European Tour event at the final qualifying stage receive £100. A further £400 per Pro Tour event (£800 per European Tour event) was reserved for a nine-dart finish. If this was not won in an event, it was carried over to the next event, and so on until a nine-dart finish was achieved. Once the prize fund was won, it reverted to the starting value for the next event.

== PDC Pro Tour Card ==
128 players were granted Tour Cards, which enabled them to participate in all Players Championships, UK Open Qualifiers and European Tour events.

=== Tour cards ===
The 2012 Tour Cards were awarded to:

- 64 players from the PDC Order of Merit after the 2012 World Championship
- 20 Tour Card holders from the previous year's Qualifying School not included among the 64 Order of Merit qualifiers
- no Tour Card holders from the previous year's 2010 PDC Women's World Championship invitations ( (England) Tricia Wright and (United States) Stacy Bromberg both resigned their membership)
- 1 semi-finalist from the 2012 BDO World Championship ( (England) Ted Hankey; the other three semi-finalists (Netherlands) Christian Kist, (Netherlands) Wesley Harms and (England) Tony O'Shea declined invitations)
- 1 finalist from the 2012 PDC World Youth Championship ( (England) James Hubbard; the other finalist (Netherlands) Michael van Gerwen was among the 64 qualified players from the Order of Merit)
- 2 highest-ranking players from the 2011 PDC Youth Tour Order of Merit not already qualified ( (England) Paul Barham and (England) Reece Robinson)
- 40 qualifiers from a four-day Qualifying School in Barnsley (4 semi-finalists from each day, plus the top 24 players from the Q School Order of Merit)

=== Q School ===
The PDC Pro Tour Qualifying School took place at the Metrodome in Barnsley from January 19–22.

January 19	January 20	January 21	January 22
(England) Richie Howson (England) Andy Cornwall (England) Darren Whittingham (England) Tony West	(England) Steve West (England) Stuart Kellett (England) Michael Barnard (Belgium) Kurt van de Rijck	(England) Dean Winstanley (Canada) Jeff Smith (England) Adrian Gray (England) Andrew Gilding	(England) Dave Smith (England) Johnny Haines (Wales) Jamie Lewis (Germany) Bernd Roith

A Q School Order of Merit was also created by using the following points system:

Stage	Points
Last 8	9
Last 16	5
Last 32	3
Last 64	2
Last 128	1

To complete the field of 128 Tour Card Holders, places were allocated down the final Qualifying School Order of Merit. The following players picked up Tour Cards as a result:

1. (England) John Bowles
2. (Netherlands) Gino Vos
3. (England) Andy Jenkins
4. (England) Matt Clark
5. (England) Joe Murnan
6. (England) Gary Butcher
7. (England) Stephen Hardy
8. (England) Keegan Brown
9. (Netherlands) Mareno Michels
10. (England) Ross Smith
11. (England) Matthew Edgar
12. (England) Nick Fullwell
13. (England) Daniel Starkey
14. (Republic of Ireland) Connie Finnan
15. (England) Gaz Cousins
16. (Wales) Gareth Pass
17. (England) Tony Littleton
18. (England) John Scott
19. (Republic of Ireland) Paddy Meaney
20. (England) Steve Grubb
21. (Scotland) Jim Walker
22. (England) Liam Kelly
23. (Scotland) Les Wallace
24. (Scotland) Keith Stephen

== Players Championships ==
(All matches – best of 11 legs)

=== Players Championship 1 ===
- Spanish Darts Trophy Players Championship 1 was contested at the Hotel Melia, Benidorm, Alicante on 28 January. Justin Pipe won his fourth PDC ranking title by whitewashing Paul Nicholson 6–0 in the final.

Quarter-finals
1	(England) Justin Pipe	6
(England) Shaun Griffiths	2
(England) Ian White	6
(England) Darren Whittingham	2
2	(England) Wes Newton	5
(Sweden) Magnus Caris	6
3	(Australia) Paul Nicholson	6
11	(England) Mark Walsh	3

Semi-finals
1	(England) Justin Pipe	6
(England) Ian White	4
(Sweden) Magnus Caris	2
3	(Australia) Paul Nicholson	6

Final
1	(England) Justin Pipe	6
3	(Australia) Paul Nicholson	0

=== Players Championship 2 ===
- Spanish Darts Trophy Players Championship 2 at the Hotel Melia Benidorm, Alicante on 29 January.

Quarter-finals
1	(England) Justin Pipe	6
(England) Ross Smith	3
(England) Matt Clark	6
(Belgium) Kim Huybrechts	4
31	(England) Michael Smith	6
7	(England) Dave Chisnall	3
14	(England) James Wade	6
(England) Alex Roy	5

Semi-finals
1	(England) Justin Pipe	6
(England) Matt Clark	5
31	(England) Michael Smith	6
14	(England) James Wade	4

Final
1	(England) Justin Pipe	3
31	(England) Michael Smith	6

=== Players Championship 3 ===
- Players Championship 3 at the Rivermead Centre, Reading on 10 March.

Quarter-finals
1	(Scotland) Gary Anderson	6
8	(England) Dave Chisnall	3
4	(England) Wes Newton	6
12	(England) Mervyn King	3
31	(England) Terry Jenkins	2
10	(Australia) Simon Whitlock	6
3	(England) Phil Taylor	6
(Belgium) Kim Huybrechts	1

Semi-finals
1	(Scotland) Gary Anderson	4
4	(England) Wes Newton	6
10	(Australia) Simon Whitlock	1
3	(England) Phil Taylor	6

Final
4	(England) Wes Newton	1
3	(England) Phil Taylor	6

=== Players Championship 4 ===
- Players Championship 4 at the Rivermead Centre, Reading on 11 March.

Quarter-finals
(England) Andy Hamilton	0
8	(England) Dave Chisnall	6
20	(England) Steve Beaton	6
21	(England) Jamie Caven	5
(Belgium) Kim Huybrechts	6
23	(Netherlands) Raymond van Barneveld	5
3	(England) Phil Taylor	6
11	(England) James Wade	4

Semi-finals
8	(England) Dave Chisnall	6
20	(England) Steve Beaton	5
(Belgium) Kim Huybrechts	4
3	(England) Phil Taylor	6

Final
8	(England) Dave Chisnall	6
3	(England) Phil Taylor	5

=== Players Championship 5 ===
- Players Championship 5 at the K2 Centre, Crawley on 26 May.

Quarter-finals
1	(England) Justin Pipe	4
25	(England) Terry Jenkins	6
4	(England) Dave Chisnall	6
5	(Netherlands) Raymond van Barneveld	3
15	(Wales) Mark Webster	6
26	(Belgium) Kim Huybrechts	2
(England) Ian White	6
11	(England) Ronnie Baxter	4

Semi-finals
25	(England) Terry Jenkins	2
4	(England) Dave Chisnall	6
15	(Wales) Mark Webster	2
(England) Ian White	6

Final
4	(England) Dave Chisnall	6
(England) Ian White	2

=== Players Championship 6 ===
- Players Championship 6 at the K2 Centre, Crawley on 27 May.

Quarter-finals
1	(England) Justin Pipe	6
8	(Australia) Simon Whitlock	3
20	(England) Mervyn King	2
5	(Netherlands) Raymond van Barneveld	6
2	(England) Dave Chisnall	6
26	(Belgium) Kim Huybrechts	4
19	(England) Terry Jenkins	3
(England) Keegan Brown	6

Semi-finals
1	(England) Justin Pipe	6
5	(Netherlands) Raymond van Barneveld	4
2	(England) Dave Chisnall	6
(England) Keegan Brown	1

Final
1	(England) Justin Pipe	4
2	(England) Dave Chisnall	6

=== Players Championship 7 ===
- Players Championship 7 at the NIA Community Hall, Birmingham on 16 June.

Quarter-finals
(England) Adrian Lewis	6
25	(England) Mark Walsh	4
4	(Scotland) Gary Anderson	1
21	(England) Colin Lloyd	6
(England) Peter Hudson	1
7	(England) Ronnie Baxter	6
3	(England) Wes Newton	6
6	(Australia) Simon Whitlock	5

Semi-finals
(England) Adrian Lewis	6
21	(England) Colin Lloyd	3
7	(England) Ronnie Baxter	6
3	(England) Wes Newton	5

Final
(England) Adrian Lewis	3
7	(England) Ronnie Baxter	6

=== Players Championship 8 ===
- Players Championship 8 at the NIA Community Hall, Birmingham on 17 June.

Quarter-finals
1	(England) Justin Pipe	1
9	(Netherlands) Michael van Gerwen	6
13	(England) Steve Beaton	2
(Scotland) Robert Thornton	6
15	(England) Mervyn King	1
7	(Australia) Simon Whitlock	6
3	(England) Wes Newton	6
(England) Darren Webster	5

Semi-finals
9	(Netherlands) Michael van Gerwen	6
(Scotland) Robert Thornton	2
7	(Australia) Simon Whitlock	6
3	(England) Wes Newton	3

Final
9	(Netherlands) Michael van Gerwen	6
7	(Australia) Simon Whitlock	1

=== Players Championship 9 ===
- Players Championship 9 at the K2 Centre, Crawley on 30 June.

Quarter-finals			Semi-finals			Final
32	(England) Adrian Lewis	6
24	(Northern Ireland) Brendan Dolan	4	32	(England) Adrian Lewis	5
4	(Australia) Simon Whitlock	5	5	(England) Ronnie Baxter	6
5	(England) Ronnie Baxter	6				5	(England) Ronnie Baxter	4
2	(England) Dave Chisnall	6				2	(England) Dave Chisnall	6
26	(England) Ian White	4	2	(England) Dave Chisnall	6
19	(Scotland) Peter Wright	5	6	(England) James Wade	2
6	(England) James Wade	6

=== Players Championship 10 ===
- Players Championship 10 at the K2 Centre, Crawley on 1 July.

Quarter-finals
1	(England) Justin Pipe	2
24	(England) Ian White	6
13	(England) Terry Jenkins	4
12	(England) Colin Lloyd	6
(England) Mark Hylton	4
26	(England) Andy Hamilton	6
14	(Belgium) Kim Huybrechts	6
6	(Australia) Simon Whitlock	2

Semi-finals
24	(England) Ian White	4
12	(England) Colin Lloyd	6
26	(England) Andy Hamilton	6
14	(Belgium) Kim Huybrechts	4

Final
12	(England) Colin Lloyd	6
26	(England) Andy Hamilton	5

=== Players Championship 11 ===
- Players Championship 11 at the Barnsley Metrodome, Barnsley on 15 September.

Quarter-finals
1	(England) Justin Pipe	4
8	(England) Ian White	6
13	(England) Terry Jenkins	6
5	(Australia) Simon Whitlock	3
15	(Scotland) Gary Anderson	0
7	Michael van Gerwen	6
19	(England) Andy Hamilton	6
6	(England) Mervyn King	3

Semi-finals
8	(England) Ian White	6
13	(England) Terry Jenkins	0
7	Michael van Gerwen	6
19	(England) Andy Hamilton	2

Final
8	(England) Ian White	1
Michael van Gerwen	6

=== Players Championship 12 ===
- Players Championship 12 at the Barnsley Metrodome, Barnsley on 16 September.

Quarter-finals
1	(England) Justin Pipe	5
(England) Dennis Priestley	6
(England) Steve Maish	5
5	(Australia) Simon Whitlock	6
18	(England) Andy Hamilton	6
(England) Nigel Heydon	5
(India) Prakash Jiwa	5
6	(Netherlands) Michael van Gerwen	6

Semi-finals
(England) Dennis Priestley	2
5	(Australia) Simon Whitlock	6
18	(England) Andy Hamilton	6
6	(Netherlands) Michael van Gerwen	2

Final
5	(Australia) Simon Whitlock	6
18	(England) Andy Hamilton	4

=== Players Championship 13 ===
- Players Championship 13 at the Citywest Hotel, Dublin on 6 October.

Quarter-finals		Semi-finals		Final
(Scotland) Robert Thornton	6
(England) Denis Ovens	5	(Scotland) Robert Thornton	6
(England) Scott Rand	6	(England) Scott Rand	5
(Belgium) Kim Huybrechts	3			(Scotland) Robert Thornton	5
(England) Arron Monk	6			(Netherlands) Michael van Gerwen	6
(Wales) Mark Webster	3	(England) Arron Monk	1
(Netherlands) Michael van Gerwen	6	(Netherlands) Michael van Gerwen	6
(England) Joe Cullen	2

=== Players Championship 14 ===
- Players Championship 14 at the Citywest Hotel, Dublin on 7 October.

Quarter-finals		Semi-finals		Final
(Scotland) Robert Thornton	6
(England) Mervyn King	3	(Scotland) Robert Thornton	6
(England) Wes Newton	6	(England) Wes Newton	3
(England) Ronnie Baxter	3			(Scotland) Robert Thornton	6
(England) Dave Chisnall	6			(Scotland) Gary Anderson	5
(Belgium) Kim Huybrechts	4	(England) Dave Chisnall	3
(Scotland) Gary Anderson	6	(Scotland) Gary Anderson	6
(Netherlands) Raymond van Barneveld	4

=== Players Championship 15 ===
- Players Championship 15 at the Gleneagle Hotel, Killarney, Ireland on 20 October.

Quarter-finals		Semi-finals		Final
(Scotland) Robert Thornton	6
(England) Andy Smith	5	(Scotland) Robert Thornton	6
(England) Darren Webster	6	(England) Darren Webster	3
(England) Colin Osborne	5			(Scotland) Robert Thornton	1
(England) Adrian Gray	6			(Scotland) Peter Wright	6
(England) Andy Hamilton	5	(England) Adrian Gray	4
(Scotland) Peter Wright	6	(Scotland) Peter Wright	6
(England) Steve Beaton	4

=== Players Championship 16 ===
- Players Championship 16 at the Gleneagle Hotel, Killarney, Ireland on 21 October.

Quarter-finals		Semi-finals		Final
(England) Jamie Caven	6
(England) Nigel Heydon	0	(England) Jamie Caven	3
(Netherlands) Michael van Gerwen	6	(Netherlands) Michael van Gerwen	6
(England) Kevin McDine	1			(Netherlands) Michael van Gerwen	6
(England) Nick Fullwell	6			(England) Nick Fullwell	3
(Scotland) John Henderson	2	(England) Nick Fullwell	6
(Scotland) Peter Wright	6	(Scotland) Peter Wright	4
(England) Ian White	1

=== Players Championship 17 ===
- Players Championship 17 at the K2 Centre, Crawley on 3 November.

Quarter-finals
(England) Dennis Priestley	6
25	(England) Kevin Painter	4
13	(Scotland) Peter Wright	4
5	(Netherlands) Michael van Gerwen	6
2	(England) Justin Pipe	1
7	(England) Ian White	6
3	(Australia) Simon Whitlock	6
11	(England) Terry Jenkins	4

Semi-finals
(England) Dennis Priestley	6
5	(Netherlands) Michael van Gerwen	1
7	(England) Ian White	4
3	(Australia) Simon Whitlock	6

Final
(England) Dennis Priestley	2
3	(Australia) Simon Whitlock	6

=== Players Championship 18 ===
- Players Championship 18 at the K2 Centre, Crawley on 4 November.

Quarter-finals			Semi-finals			Final
1	(England) Dave Chisnall	6
9	(Scotland) Robert Thornton	3	1	(England) Dave Chisnall	1
4	(Netherlands) Michael van Gerwen	6	4	(Netherlands) Michael van Gerwen	6
12	(England) Colin Lloyd	2				4	(Netherlands) Michael van Gerwen	6
2	(Australia) Simon Whitlock	6				6	(England) Ian White	5
10	(England) Terry Jenkins	5	2	(Australia) Simon Whitlock	4
14	(Northern Ireland) Brendan Dolan	1	6	(England) Ian White	6
6	(England) Ian White	6

=== Players Championship 19 ===
- Players Championship 19 at the Barnsley Metrodome, Barnsley on 24 November.

Quarter-finals
1	(England) Dave Chisnall	6
8	(Belgium) Kim Huybrechts	5
4	(Netherlands) Michael van Gerwen	6
(England) Dennis Priestley	5
(England) Arron Monk	1
10	(Scotland) Robert Thornton	6
3	(England) Phil Taylor	6
27	(Scotland) Gary Anderson	1

Semi-finals
1	(England) Dave Chisnall	6
(Netherlands) Michael van Gerwen	3
10	(Scotland) Robert Thornton	5
3	(England) Phil Taylor	6

Final
1	(England) Dave Chisnall	6
3	(England) Phil Taylor	3

=== Players Championship 20 ===
- Players Championship 20 at the Barnsley Metrodome, Barnsley on 25 November.

Quarter-finals
(Canada) John Part	1
9	(Scotland) Robert Thornton	6
(England) Dennis Priestley	2
5	(England) Phil Taylor	6
15	(Scotland) Peter Wright	5
10	(England) Adrian Lewis	6
3	(Netherlands) Michael van Gerwen	6
(Republic of Ireland) Connie Finnan	1

Semi-finals
9	(Scotland) Robert Thornton	5
5	(England) Phil Taylor	6
10	(England) Adrian Lewis	2
3	(Netherlands) Michael van Gerwen	6

Final
5	(England) Phil Taylor	5
3	(Netherlands) Michael van Gerwen	6

== Youth Tour ==
The PDC Youth Tour consisted of 18 events held across seven weekends, where two events were played on the Saturday and one event on the Sunday with the exception of the final weekend. Events were open to players aged between 14 and 21 at the beginning of the year. The top 32 players from the Youth Tour Order of Merit qualified for the 2013 PDC World Youth Championship.

No.	Date	Venue	Winner	Legs	Runner-up	Ref.
1	Saturday April 21	(England) Derby	Arron Monk (England)	4–0	(England) James Hubbard	
2	Saturday April 21	(England) Derby	Michael Smith (England)	4–2	(England) Daniel King-Morris	
3	Sunday April 22	(England) Derby	Arron Monk (England)	4–0	(England) Michael Smith	
4	Saturday May 19	(England) Reading	James Hubbard (England)	4–1	(England) Ben Songhurst	
5	Saturday May 19	(England) Reading	Michael Smith (England)	4–1	(England) Jamie Landon	
6	Sunday May 20	(England) Reading	Arron Monk (England)	4–2	(England) Liam Showell	
7	Saturday June 2	(Germany) Cologne	Adam Smith-Neale (England)	4–2	(England) Josh Payne	
8	Saturday June 2	(Germany) Cologne	Chris Aubrey (England)	4–3	(Wales) Jamie Lewis	
9	Sunday June 3	(Germany) Cologne	Jamie Lewis (Wales)	4–3	(England) Arron Monk	
10	Saturday July 14	(England) Barnsley	Sam Hamilton (England)	4–3	(England) Reece Robinson	
11	Saturday July 14	(England) Barnsley	Arron Monk (England)	4–2	(England) Sam Head	
12	Sunday July 15	(England) Barnsley	James Hubbard (England)	4–0	(England) Sam Hill	
13	Saturday August 4	(England) Derby	Jamie Lewis (Wales)	4–0	(England) Michael Smith	
14	Saturday August 4	(England) Derby	Jamie Landon (England)	4–3	(Netherlands) John de Kruijf	
15	Sunday August 5	(England) Derby	Michael Smith (England)	4–0	(England) Lee Whitworth	
16	Saturday September 29	(England) Wigan	Michael Smith (England)	4–1	(England) Ricky Evans	
17	Saturday September 29	(England) Wigan	Keegan Brown (England)	4–1	(England) George Killington	
18	Sunday September 30	(England) Wigan	Michael Smith (England)	4–2	(England) Josh Payne	

== UK Open Qualifiers ==
No.	Date	Venue	Winner	Legs	Runner-up
1	Saturday February 11	K2 Centre, Crawley	Wes Newton (England)	6–3	(Belgium) Kim Huybrechts
2	Sunday February 12	K2 Centre, Crawley	Michael van Gerwen (Netherlands)	6–1	(England) Dave Chisnall
3	Saturday March 24	Barnsley Metrodome, Barnsley	Phil Taylor (England)	6–2	(Northern Ireland) Brendan Dolan
4	Sunday March 25	Barnsley Metrodome, Barnsley	Phil Taylor (England)	6–3	(England) Dennis Smith
5	Saturday April 14	Barnsley Metrodome, Barnsley	Raymond van Barneveld (Netherlands)	6–3	(England) Andy Smith
6	Sunday April 15	Barnsley Metrodome, Barnsley	Raymond van Barneveld (Netherlands)	6–2	(England) Ian White
7	Saturday May 5	NIA Community Hall, Birmingham	Terry Jenkins (England)	6–3	(England) Andy Hamilton
8	Sunday May 6	NIA Community Hall, Birmingham	Wes Newton (England)	6–2	(England) Justin Pipe

== European Tour ==
No.	Event	Venue	Winner	Legs	Runner-up	Ref.
1	Austrian Darts Open	(Austria) Arena Nova, Vienna	Justin Pipe (England)	6–3	(England) James Wade	
2	German Darts Championship	(Germany) Tempodrom, Berlin	Phil Taylor (England)	6–2	(England) Dave Chisnall	
3	European Darts Open	(Germany) Maritim Hotel, Düsseldorf	Raymond van Barneveld (Netherlands)	6–4	(England) Dave Chisnall	
4	German Darts Masters	(Germany) Glaspalast, Sindelfingen	Adrian Lewis (England)	6–3	(England) Ian White	
5	Dutch Darts Masters	(Netherlands) Van Der Valk Hotel, Nuland	Simon Whitlock (Australia)	6–1	(Australia) Paul Nicholson	

== Scandinavian Darts Corporation Pro Tour ==
No.	Also known as the	Venue	Winner	Legs	Runner-up	Ref.
1	SDC Denmark 1	Park Inn Copenhagen Airport, Copenhagen, Denmark	Jarkko Komula (Finland)	6–5	(Finland) Jani Haavisto	
2	SDC Denmark 2	Park Inn Copenhagen Airport, Copenhagen, Denmark	Jani Haavisto (Finland)	6–5	(Norway) Robert Wagner	
3	SDC Finland 1	Hotel Tallukka, Vääksy, Finland	Robert Wagner (Norway)	6–4	(Finland) Ulf Ceder	
4	SDC Finland 2	Hotel Tallukka, Vääksy, Finland	Jarkko Komula (Finland)	6–1	(Finland) Ulf Ceder	
5	SDC Sweden 1	Stockholm, Sweden	Jani Haavisto (Finland)	6–4	(Finland) Jarkko Komula	
6	SDC Sweden 2	Stockholm, Sweden	Magnus Caris (Sweden)	6–5	(Denmark) Vladimir Andersen	
7	SDC Denmark 3	Park Inn Copenhagen Airport, Copenhagen, Denmark	Veijo Viinikka (Finland)	6–4	(Sweden) Magnus Caris	
8	SDC Denmark 4	Park Inn Copenhagen Airport, Copenhagen, Denmark	Dennis Lindskjold (Denmark)	6–3	(Denmark) Niels Jørgen Hansen	

== North American Pro Tour ==
No.	Also known as the	Venue	Winner	Legs	Runner-up	Ref.
1	North American Pro Tour Chicago	Hyatt Regency O'Hare, Chicago, Chicago, United States	John Part (Canada)	6–1	(United States) Darin Young	
2	North American Pro Tour Ontario	Hilton London Ontario, Ontario, Canada	Andre Carman (Canada)	6–3	(United States) Darin Young	
3	North American Pro Tour Atlantic City	Resorts Casino & Hotel, Atlantic City, Atlantic City, United States	Larry Butler (United States)	6–1	(United States) Darin Young	
4	World Dart Series 1	United States	Scott Wollaston (United States)	6–1	(United States) Larry Butler	

== Australian Grand Prix Pro Tour ==
The Australian Grand Prix rankings are calculated from events across Australia. The top player in the rankings automatically qualifies for the 2013 World Championship.

No.	Date	Also known as	Winner	Legs	Runner-up	Ref.
1	Saturday 21 January	DPA Australian Matchplay 1	Barry Jouannet Jr (Australia)	6–3	(Australia) Bill Aitken	
2	Sunday 22 January	DPA Australian Matchplay 2	Sean Reed (Australia)	6–5	(Australia) Rob Modra	
3	Saturday 4 February	Mittagong RSL Open 1	Russell Stewart (Australia)	6–4	(Australia) Ben Gaiter	
4	Sunday 5 February	Mittagong RSL Open 2	Harley Kemp (Australia)	6–4	(New Zealand) Phillip Hazel	
5	Saturday 18 February	Redcliffe Darts Open 1	Shane Tichowitsch (Australia)	6–5	(Australia) Gordon Mathers	
6	Sunday 19 February	Redcliffe Darts Open 2	Sean Reed (Australia)	6–1	(Australia) Craig Gwynne	
7	Saturday 3 March	Victoria Open 1	Jackson Wilson-Young (Australia)	6–4	(England) Wayne Clegg	
8	Sunday 4 March	Victoria Open 2	Sean Reed (Australia)	6–4	(Australia) Rob Modra	
9	Saturday 31 March	Boorowa Open 1	Jackson Wilson-Young (Australia)	6–2	(Australia) Shane Tichowitsch	
10	Sunday 1 April	Boorowa Open 2	Rob Modra (Australia)	6–4	(Australia) Shane Tichowitsch	
11	Saturday 14 April	Dosh DPA Kazco Open 1	Shane Tichowitsch (Australia)	6–3	(Australia) Beau Anderson	
12	Sunday 15 April	Dosh DPA Kazco Open 2	Shane Tichowitsch (Australia)	6–5	(Australia) Beau Anderson	
13	Saturday 28 April	Cabbage Tree Hotel Open	Shane Tichowitsch (Australia)	6–3	(Australia) Ben Gaiter	
14	Sunday 29 April	DPA Australian Singles	Gordon Mathers (Australia)	6–5	(England) Wayne Clegg	
15	Saturday 26 May	Redcliffe Darts Open 3	Gordon Mathers (Australia)	6–0	(Australia) James Bailey	
16	Sunday 27 May	Redcliffe Darts Open 4	Craig Gwynne (Australia)	6–2	(Australia) Sean Reed	
17	Saturday 9 June	South Australian Open 1	Shane Tichowitsch (Australia)	6–3	(Australia) Sean Reed	
18	Sunday 10 June	South Australian Open 2	Shane Tichowitsch (Australia)	6–2	(Australia) Sean Reed	
19	Saturday 23 June	Billabong Tavern Darts Open	Shane Tichowitsch (Australia)	6–1	(Australia) Sean Reed	
20	Sunday 24 June	Russell Stewart Classic	Shane Tichowitsch (Australia)	6–5	(Australia) Sean Reed	
21	Saturday 14 July	SID Darts Open	Shane Tichowitsch (Australia)	6–2	(England) Wayne Clegg	
22	Sunday 15 July	Warilla Bowls Club Open	Sean Reed (Australia)	6–3	(Australia) Shane Tichowitsch	
23	Saturday 11 August	Robina Gold Coast Open 1	David Platt (England)	6–5	(Australia) Pat Orreal	
24	Sunday 12 August	Robina Gold Coast Open 2	David Platt (England)	6–5	(Australia) Jeremy Fagg	
25	Friday 17 August	Australian Open	Phil Taylor (England)	6–2	(Australia) Simon Whitlock	
26	Saturday 18 August	DPA Tournament of Champions	Phil Taylor (England)	6–3	(Japan) Masumi Chino	
27	Sunday 19 August	DPA Australian Masters	Simon Whitlock (Australia)	6–5	(England) Phil Taylor	
28	Saturday 6 October	Goulburn Open 1	Tic Bridge (Australia)	6–3	(Australia) Jackson Wilson-Young	
30	Friday 26 October	Canberra DPA Event 1	Gordon Mathers (Australia)	6–4	(Australia) Russell Stewart	
31	Saturday 27 October	Canberra DPA Event 2	Kyle Anderson (Australia)	6–3	(Australia) Gordon Mathers	

== Other PDC tournaments ==
The PDC also held a number of other tournaments during 2012. These were mainly smaller events with low prize money, and some had eligibility restrictions. All of these tournaments were non-ranking.

Date	Event	Winner	Score	Runner-Up	Ref
September 9	PDC World New Zealand Qualifying Event	(New Zealand) Dave Harrington	beat	(New Zealand) Barry Whittaker	
September 30	PDC World Japan Qualifying Event	(Japan) Haruki Muramatsu	6–0	(Japan) Sho Katsumi	
September 30	PDC World Germany Qualifying Event	(Germany) Andree Welge	2–1	(Germany) Tomas Seyler	
October 14	PDC World China Qualifying Event	(Hong Kong) Leung Chen Nam	beat	(China) Shen Jianhua	
October 14	Tom Kirby Memorial Trophy	(Northern Ireland) Daryl Gurney	6–3	(Northern Ireland) Campbell Jackson	
October 14	PDC World South Africa Qualifying Event	(South Africa) Charl Pietersen	8–1	(South Africa) Charles Losper	
October 19	Gleneagle Irish Masters	(Scotland) Gary Anderson	6–1	(England) Colin Osborne	
October 21	PDC World Philippines Qualifying Event	(Philippines) Lourence Ilagan	beat	(Philippines) Andy Villamor	
October 28	Oceanic Masters	(Australia) Kyle Anderson	8–3	(Australia) Tic Bridge	
November 10	PDC World South Asian Qualifying Event	(Malaysia) Mohd Latif Sapup	beat	(Malaysia) Lee Choon Peng	
November 10	PDC World Central European Qualifying Event	(Germany) Max Hopp	6–1	(Austria) Maik Langendorf	
November 10	PDC World West European Qualifying Event	(Spain) Carlos Rodríguez	6–5	(Netherlands) Stefan Couwenberg	
November 17	PDC World East European Qualifying Event	(Croatia) Robert Marijanović	6–1	(Hungary) Gyula Perle	
November 26	PDC World Darts Championship PDPA Qualifier	(England) Stuart Kellett	5–1	(England) John Bowles	
