= 2013 PDC Pro Tour =

The 2013 PDC Pro Tour was a series of non-televised darts tournaments organised by the Professional Darts Corporation (PDC). They were the Professional Dart Players Association Players Championships, the UK Open Qualifiers, and the European Tour events. This year there were 32 PDC Pro Tour events – 16 Players Championships, 8 UK Open Qualifiers, and 8 European Tour events.

== Prize money ==
Prize money for each UK Open Qualifier was £34,600, unchanged from 2012. Prize money for each Players Championship has been increased from £34,600 to £50,000, and the prize money for European Tour events has been increased to £100,000.

Stage	ET	PC	UKQ	YT
Winner	£20,000	£10,000	£6,000	£500
Runner-up	£10,000	£5,000	£3,000	£300
Semi-finalists	£5,000	£2,500	£2,000	£200
Quarter-finalists	£3,000	£1,500	£1,000	£100
Last 16	£2,000	£1,000	£600	£75
Last 32	£1,000	£500	£400	£50
Last 64	£500	£250	£200	N/A
Total	£100,000	£50,000	£34,600	£3,000

== PDC Pro Tour Card ==
128 players were granted Tour Cards, which enabled them to participate in all Players Championships, UK Open Qualifiers and European Tour events.

=== Tour cards ===
The 2013 Tour Cards were awarded to:

- 63 of the top 64 players from the PDC Order of Merit after the 2013 World Championship ( (South Africa) Devon Petersen resigned his card)
- 37 Tour Card winners from 2012 not included among the 64 Order of Merit qualifiers ( (England) Gary Butcher, (England) Liam Kelly, (England) Dave Smith and (Scotland) Les Wallace resigned their cards)
- The two highest non-exempt players from the PDC Unicorn Youth Tour ( (England) Chris Aubrey and (England) Josh Payne)
- The winner of the Scandinavian Darts Corporation's Order of Merit ( (Finland) Jarkko Komula)
- 25 qualifiers from a four-day Qualifying School in Wigan (four semi-finalists from each day, plus the top nine players from the Q School Order of Merit)

=== Q School ===
The PDC Pro Tour Qualifying School took place at the Robin Park Tennis Centre in Wigan from January 17–20.

January 17	January 18	January 19	January 20
(Germany) Jyhan Artut (England) Ricky Evans (Canada) Ken MacNeil (South Africa) Charl Pietersen	(England) Louis Blundell (Northern Ireland) Daryl Gurney (Finland) Jani Haavisto (England) Ian Walters	(England) Marc Dewsbury (Belgium) Ronny Huybrechts (Northern Ireland) Campbell Jackson (Germany) Andree Welge	(England) Steve Coote (Hong Kong) Royden Lam (England) Kevin McDine (England) Joey Palfreyman

A Q School Order of Merit was also created by using the following points system:

Stage	Points
Last 8	9
Last 16	5
Last 32	3
Last 64	2
Last 128	1

To complete the field of 128 Tour Card Holders, places were allocated down the final Qualifying School Order of Merit. The following players picked up Tour Cards as a result:

1. (England) Martyn Turner
2. (England) David Pallett
3. (England) Dan Russell
4. (Netherlands) Edwin Max
5. (England) Paul Amos
6. (Netherlands) Ryan de Vreede
7. (England) Kirk Shepherd
8. (England) Kevin Dowling
9. (England) Darren Johnson

== Players Championships ==
(All matches – best of 11 legs)

There were 16 Players Championship events this year. The first of these was played in Wigan on 4 May 2013 and the last in Wigan on 24 November 2013. The top 32 after all events were completed qualified for the 2013 Players Championship Finals.

=== Players Championship 1 ===
Players Championship 1 was contested in Wigan on 4 May. The tournament was won by Robert Thornton, who defeated Ronny Huybrechts 6–0 in the final.

Quarter-finals
1	(Netherlands) Michael van Gerwen	5
24	(Scotland) Gary Anderson	6
4	(Scotland) Robert Thornton	6
(England) Dean Winstanley	1
2	(Australia) Simon Whitlock	3
10	(Belgium) Kim Huybrechts	6
3	(England) Dave Chisnall	3
(Belgium) Ronny Huybrechts	6

Semi-finals
24	(Scotland) Gary Anderson	3
4	(Scotland) Robert Thornton	6
10	(Belgium) Kim Huybrechts	1
(Belgium) Ronny Huybrechts	6

Final
4	(Scotland) Robert Thornton	6
(Belgium) Ronny Huybrechts	0

=== Players Championship 2 ===
Players Championship 2 was contested in Wigan on 5 May. The tournament was won by Michael van Gerwen, who defeated Stuart Kellett 6–1 in the final.

Quarter-finals
1	(Netherlands) Michael van Gerwen	6
9	(Scotland) Peter Wright	5
29	(England) Colin Osborne	2
(England) Dennis Smith	6
2	(England) Dave Chisnall	4
10	(England) Phil Taylor	6
19	(England) Stuart Kellett	6
11	(England) Ronnie Baxter	2

Semi-finals
1	(Netherlands) Michael van Gerwen	6
(England) Dennis Smith	4
10	(England) Phil Taylor	4
19	(England) Stuart Kellett	6

Final
1	(Netherlands) Michael van Gerwen	6
19	(England) Stuart Kellett	1

=== Players Championship 3 ===
Players Championship 3 was contested in Wigan on 25 May. The tournament was won by Jamie Caven, who defeated Paul Nicholson 6–4 in the final.

Quarter-finals
(Northern Ireland) Mickey Mansell	4
8	(Australia) Paul Nicholson	6
13	(Scotland) Gary Anderson	2
12	(England) Justin Pipe	6
2	(Scotland) Robert Thornton	6
(England) Dennis Priestley	2
19	(England) Jamie Caven	6
23	(England) Kevin Painter	1

Semi-finals
8	(Australia) Paul Nicholson	6
12	(England) Justin Pipe	3
2	(Scotland) Robert Thornton	3
19	(England) Jamie Caven	6

Final
8	(Australia) Paul Nicholson	4
19	(England) Jamie Caven	6

=== Players Championship 4 ===
Players Championship 3 was contested in Wigan on 26 May. The tournament was won by Jamie Caven, who defeated Jelle Klaasen 6–4 in the final.

Quarter-finals
1	(Scotland) Robert Thornton	1
9	(England) Jamie Caven	6
(England) Alex Roy	6
(England) John Bowles	4
18	(England) Andy Smith	6
26	(England) Steve Beaton	3
14	(Scotland) Gary Anderson	1
(Netherlands) Jelle Klaasen	6

Semi-finals
9	(England) Jamie Caven	6
(England) Alex Roy	3
18	(England) Andy Smith	4
(Netherlands) Jelle Klaasen	6

Final
9	(England) Jamie Caven	6
(Netherlands) Jelle Klaasen	4

=== Players Championship 5 ===
Players Championship 5 in Crawley on 22 June.

Quarter-finals
1	(Netherlands) Michael van Gerwen	6
(England) Terry Jenkins	3
4	(England) Dave Chisnall	5
5	(England) Wes Newton	6
18	(Scotland) Gary Anderson	0
10	(Scotland) Peter Wright	6
(England) Terry Temple	2
27	(England) Kevin Painter	6

Semi-finals
1	(Netherlands) Michael van Gerwen	4
5	(England) Wes Newton	6
10	(Scotland) Peter Wright	6
27	(England) Kevin Painter	3

Final
5	(England) Wes Newton	1
10	(Scotland) Peter Wright	6

=== Players Championship 6 ===
Players Championship 6 in Crawley on 23 June.

Quarter-finals
1	(Netherlands) Michael van Gerwen	6
24	(England) Andy Smith	1
20	(Northern Ireland) Brendan Dolan	6
5	(England) Wes Newton	4
15	(England) Andy Hamilton	6
7	(England) Jamie Caven	4
3	(Scotland) Robert Thornton	6
22	(England) James Wade	3

Semi-finals
1	(Netherlands) Michael van Gerwen	6
20	(Northern Ireland) Brendan Dolan	5
15	(England) Andy Hamilton	6
3	(Scotland) Robert Thornton	2

Final
1	(Netherlands) Michael van Gerwen	6
(England) Andy Hamilton	1

=== Players Championship 7 ===
Players Championship 7 in Barnsley on 14 September.

Quarter-finals			Semi-finals			Final
1	(Netherlands) Michael van Gerwen	6
25	(Netherlands) Raymond van Barneveld	1	1	(Netherlands) Michael van Gerwen	2
4	(Scotland) Peter Wright	6	4	(Scotland) Peter Wright	6
12	(England) Ian White	4				4	(Scotland) Peter Wright	5
2	(Australia) Simon Whitlock	6				11	(England) Dave Chisnall	6
10	(Australia) Paul Nicholson	3	2	(Australia) Simon Whitlock	1
14	(England) Mervyn King	3	11	(England) Dave Chisnall	6
11	(England) Dave Chisnall	6

=== Players Championship 8 ===
Players Championship 8 in Barnsley on 15 September.

Quarter-finals
(England) Scott Rand	6
9	(Australia) Paul Nicholson	4
4	(Australia) Simon Whitlock	6
12	(England) Mervyn King	3
15	(England) Ian White	6
(England) Joe Cullen	2
30	(England) Wayne Jones	6
(England) Darren Webster	3

Semi-finals
(England) Scott Rand	0
4	(Australia) Simon Whitlock	6
15	(England) Ian White	6
30	(England) Wayne Jones	1

Final
4	(Australia) Simon Whitlock	3
15	(England) Ian White	6

=== Players Championship 9 ===
Players Championship 9 in Dublin on 5 October.

Quarter-finals
1	(Netherlands) Michael van Gerwen	5
24	(England) Justin Pipe	6
20	(England) Adrian Lewis	6
(England) Joe Cullen	5
2	(England) Dave Chisnall	1
(England) Mark Dudbridge	6
19	(Northern Ireland) Brendan Dolan	6
27	(England) James Wade	4

Semi-finals
24	(England) Justin Pipe	4
20	(England) Adrian Lewis	6
(England) Mark Dudbridge	3
19	(Northern Ireland) Brendan Dolan	6

Final
20	(England) Adrian Lewis	6
19	(Northern Ireland) Brendan Dolan	4

=== Players Championship 10 ===
Players Championship 10 in Dublin on 6 October.

Quarter-finals
1	Michael van Gerwen	6
9	Mervyn King	3
4	Peter Wright	6
(Scotland) Robert Thornton	5
(England) Andrew Gilding	6
(England) Adrian Gray	1
19	(England) Kevin Painter	1
27	Raymond van Barneveld	6

Semi-finals
1	(Netherlands) Michael van Gerwen	4
4	Peter Wright	6
(England) Andrew Gilding	2
27	Raymond van Barneveld	6

Final
4	Peter Wright	3
27	Raymond van Barneveld	6

=== Players Championship 11 ===
Players Championship 11 in Killarney on 19 October.

Quarter-finals		Semi-finals		Final
(England) Darren Webster	6
(Scotland) John Henderson	0	(England) Darren Webster	3
(England) Jamie Caven	6	(England) Jamie Caven	6
(England) Steve Beaton	3			(England) Jamie Caven	5
(England) Dave Chisnall	6			(Scotland) Robert Thornton	6
(Northern Ireland) Brendan Dolan	2	(England) Dave Chisnall	5
(Scotland) Robert Thornton	6	(Scotland) Robert Thornton	6
(England) Mark Walsh	4

=== Players Championship 12 ===
Players Championship 12 in Killarney on 20 October.

Quarter-finals		Semi-finals		Final
(Belgium) Kim Huybrechts	6
(England) Darren Webster	1	(Belgium) Kim Huybrechts	6
(England) Steve Beaton	6	(England) Steve Beaton	2
(Scotland) Gary Anderson	4			(Belgium) Kim Huybrechts	6
(England) Michael Smith	6			(England) Kevin Painter	0
(Scotland) Peter Wright	5	(England) Michael Smith	3
(England) Kevin Painter	6	(England) Kevin Painter	6
(England) Wes Newton	2

=== Players Championship 13 ===
Players Championship 13 in Wigan on 2 November.

Quarter-finals		Semi-finals		Final
(England) Ricky Evans	6
(England) Jamie Caven	5	(England) Ricky Evans	6
(England) Ian White	6	(England) Ian White	1
(England) Mark Frost	0			(England) Ricky Evans	3
(Austria) Mensur Suljović	6			(Northern Ireland) Brendan Dolan	6
(Wales) Jamie Lewis	0	(Austria) Mensur Suljović	1
(Northern Ireland) Brendan Dolan	6	(Northern Ireland) Brendan Dolan	6
(England) Kevin McDine	5

=== Players Championship 14 ===
Players Championship 14 in Wigan on 3 November.

Quarter-finals		Semi-finals		Final
(Scotland) Gary Anderson	6
(England) Andrew Gilding	5	(Scotland) Gary Anderson	0
(England) Ian White	6	(England) Ian White	6
(England) Kevin McDine	5			(England) Ian White	6
(England) Andy Jenkins	6			(England) Andy Jenkins	3
(England) Andy Smith	4	(England) Andy Jenkins	6
(England) Darren Webster	6	(England) Darren Webster	4
(England) Steve Beaton	3

=== Players Championship 15 ===
Players Championship 15 in Barnsley on 23 November.

Quarter-finals		Semi-finals		Final
(England) Mark Dudbridge	6
(England) Kevin Painter	3	(England) Mark Dudbridge	3
(Scotland) Robert Thornton	6	(Scotland) Robert Thornton	6
(England) Justin Pipe	3			(Scotland) Robert Thornton	3
(England) Dave Chisnall	6			(England) Dave Chisnall	6
(England) Michael Smith	2	(England) Dave Chisnall	6
(Scotland) Peter Wright	6	(Scotland) Peter Wright	4
(England) Darren Webster	1

=== Players Championship 16 ===
Players Championship 16 in Barnsley on 24 November.

Quarter-finals
(England) Ricky Evans	6
8	(England) Steve Beaton	2
(England) Jamie Robinson	6
28	(Wales) Jamie Lewis	5
15	(Scotland) Gary Anderson	3
7	(Northern Ireland) Brendan Dolan	6
14	(Australia) Paul Nicholson	3
27	(England) Terry Jenkins	6

Semi-finals
(England) Ricky Evans	5
(England) Jamie Robinson	6
7	(Northern Ireland) Brendan Dolan	6
27	(England) Terry Jenkins	2

Final
(England) Jamie Robinson	1
7	(Northern Ireland) Brendan Dolan	6

== UK Open Qualifiers ==
The results from the eight qualifiers shown below were collated to form the UK Open Order of Merit. The top 32 players received entry into the final stages of the 2013 UK Open, with the top 96 (plus ties) entering in the earlier rounds.

No.	Date	Venue	Winner	Legs	Runner-up	Ref.
1	Saturday 23 February	K2 Leisure Centre, Crawley	Michael van Gerwen (Netherlands)	6–2	(England) Dave Chisnall	
2	Sunday 24 February	K2 Leisure Centre, Crawley	Michael van Gerwen (Netherlands)	6–2	(Northern Ireland) Brendan Dolan	
3	Saturday 16 March	Robin Park Tennis Centre, Wigan	Michael van Gerwen (Netherlands)	6–2	(England) Michael Smith	
4	Sunday 17 March	Robin Park Tennis Centre, Wigan	Robert Thornton (Scotland)	6–4	(England) Jamie Caven	
5	Saturday 13 April	Robin Park Tennis Centre, Wigan	Simon Whitlock (Australia)	6–1	(Netherlands) Michael van Gerwen	
6	Sunday 14 April	Robin Park Tennis Centre, Wigan	Michael van Gerwen (Netherlands)	6–5	(Belgium) Kim Huybrechts	
7	Saturday 27 April	Robin Park Tennis Centre, Wigan	Kim Huybrechts (Belgium)	6–2	(Canada) John Part	
8	Sunday 28 April	Robin Park Tennis Centre, Wigan	Michael van Gerwen (Netherlands)	6–0	(England) Mervyn King	

== European Tour ==
No.	Date	Also known as the	Venue	Winner	Legs	Runner-up	Ref.
1	8–10 March	UK Masters	(England) Butlins Resort, Minehead	John Part (Canada)	6–4	(England) Stuart Kellett	
2	30 March–1 April	European Darts Trophy	(Germany) Glaspalast, Sindelfingen	Wes Newton (England)	6–5	(Australia) Paul Nicholson	
3	17–19 May	European Darts Open	(Germany) Maritim Hotel, Düsseldorf	Michael van Gerwen (Netherlands)	6–2	(Australia) Simon Whitlock	
4	31 May–2 June	Austrian Darts Open	(Austria) Arena Nova, Wiener Neustadt	Michael van Gerwen (Netherlands)	6–3	(England) Mervyn King	
5	28–30 June	Gibraltar Darts Trophy	Victoria Stadium, Gibraltar	Phil Taylor (England)	6–1	(Wales) Jamie Lewis	
6	6–8 September	German Darts Championship	(Germany) Halle 39, Hildesheim	Dave Chisnall (England)	6–2	(Scotland) Peter Wright	
7	20–22 September	German Darts Masters	(Germany) Glaspalast, Sindelfingen	Steve Beaton (England)	6–5	(England) Mervyn King	
8	25–27 October	Dutch Darts Masters	Koningshof Hotel, Veldhoven, Netherlands	Kim Huybrechts (Belgium)	6–3	(Northern Ireland) Brendan Dolan	

== Challenge Tour ==
The PDC Challenge Tour was open to anyone aged between 14 and 25, who wasn't in the top 64 of the PDC Order of Merit. The top two in the Order of Merit received Tour Cards for 2014.

No.	Date	Winner	Legs	Runner-up	Ref.
1	Saturday 23 March	Rowby-John Rodriguez (Austria)	4–1	(Netherlands) Dirk van Duijvenbode	
2	Saturday 23 March	Josh Payne (England)	4–3	(Austria) Rowby-John Rodriguez	
3	Sunday 24 March	Kurt Parry (Wales)	4–1	(England) Daniel Day	
4	Saturday 20 April	Adam Hunt (England)	4–2	(England) Ricky Evans	
5	Saturday 20 April	Jamie Lewis (Wales)	4–1	(England) Chris Aubrey	
6	Sunday 21 April	Ross Smith (England)	4–1	(England) Ricky Evans	
7	Saturday 11 May	Ross Smith (England)	4–2	(Netherlands) Benito van de Pas	
8	Saturday 11 May	Graham Hall (England)	4–3	(England) Ross Smith	
9	Sunday 12 May	Benito van de Pas (Netherlands)	4–2	(Scotland) Richard Baillie	
10	Saturday 13 July	Ben Ward (England)	4–3	(England) Josh Jones	
11	Saturday 13 July	Ross Smith (England)	4–1	(England) Sam Head	
12	Sunday 14 July	Jan Dekker (Netherlands)	4–3	(Netherlands) Dirk van Duijvenbode	
13	Saturday 7 September	Ben Ward (England)	4–3	(England) Sam Hewson	
14	Saturday 7 September	Luke Woodhouse (England)	4–1	(England) Ben Ward	
15	Sunday 8 September	Ricky Evans (England)	4–3	(England) Ben Ward	
16	Saturday 28 September	Dimitri Van den Bergh (Belgium)	4–0	(England) Reece Robinson	
17	Saturday 28 September	Matthew Dennant (England)	4–1	(Germany) Max Hopp	
18	Sunday 29 September	Ross Smith (England)	4–2	(England) Adam Hunt	

== Scandinavian Darts Corporation Pro Tour ==
The Scandinavian Pro Tour had eight events this year, with a total of €40,000 on offer. The leader of the Order of Merit after four events qualified for the 2013 European Championship. The winner after all eight events earned a place in the 2014 World Championship.

No.	Date	Also known as	Venue	Winner	Legs	Runner-up	Ref.
1	Saturday 16 February	SDC Finland	Hotel Tallukka, Vääksy, Finland	Jani Haavisto (Finland)	6–0	(Finland) Ulf Ceder	
2	Sunday 17 February	SDC Finland	Hotel Tallukka, Vääksy, Finland	Per Laursen (Denmark)	6–3	(Denmark) Dennis Lindskjold	
3	Saturday 11 May	SDC Finland	Hotel Tallukka, Vääksy, Finland	Jani Haavisto (Finland)	6–3	(Denmark) Per Laursen	
4	Sunday 12 May	SDC Finland	Hotel Tallukka, Vääksy, Finland	Magnus Caris (Sweden)	6–2	(Finland) Ali Roberts	
5	Saturday 3 August	SDC Denmark	Park Inn Copenhagen Airport, Copenhagen, Denmark	Jani Haavisto (Finland)	6–1	(Finland) Veijo Viinikka	
6	Sunday 4 August	SDC Denmark	Park Inn Copenhagen Airport, Copenhagen, Denmark	Jarkko Komula (Finland)	6–0	(Denmark) Per Laursen	
7	Saturday 28 September	SDC Denmark	Park Inn Copenhagen Airport, Copenhagen, Denmark	Magnus Caris (Sweden)	6–2	(Finland) Jarkko Komula	
8	Sunday 29 September	SDC Denmark	Park Inn Copenhagen Airport, Copenhagen, Denmark	Per Laursen (Denmark)	6–5	(Denmark) Per Skau	

Reference for the dates, tournament names and venues in the table

== North American Pro Tour ==
The North American Pro Tour was for players from the USA and Canada. The top player in this ranking got into the 2014 World Championship.

No.	Date	Also known as	Venue	Winner	Legs	Runner-up	Ref.
1	Sunday 7 April	New World Dart Series #2 – Las Vegas	Tuscany Suites & Casino, Las Vegas, Nevada, United States	Darin Young (United States)	8–6	(Canada) Dan Olson	
2	Sunday 16 June	North American Championship Tour #1	Powerplex, St. John's, Newfoundland, Canada	Wayne Kelly (Canada)	6–2	(Canada) Bernie Miller	
3	Sunday 14 July	North American Championship Tour #2	Ambassador Conference Resort, Kingston, Ontario, Canada	Larry Butler (United States)	6–5	(Canada) John Part	
4	Saturday 20 July	North American Championship Tour #3	Hyatt Regency O'Hare, Chicago, Illinois, United States	Andre Carman (Canada)	6–1	(Canada) Dan Olson	
5	Sunday 21 July	North American Championship Tour #4	Hyatt Regency O'Hare, Chicago, Illinois, United States	Larry Butler (United States)	6–4	(United States) Darin Young	
6	Sunday 25 August	North American Championship Tour #5	Hilton London Ontario, London, Ontario, Canada	Jim Long (Canada)	6–2	(Canada) Shaun Narain	
7	Sunday 8 September	North American Championship Tour #6	Resorts Casino & Hotel, Atlantic City, New Jersey, United States	Dan Olson (Canada)	6–3	(United States) Darin Young	
8	Saturday 2 November	North American Championship Tour #7	Crowne Plaza Sacramento, Sacramento, California, United States	Chris White (United States)	6–3	(Canada) Shaun Narain	
9	Sunday 3 November	North American Championship Tour #8	Crowne Plaza Sacramento, Sacramento, California, United States	Darin Young (United States)	6–4	(Canada) Bernie Miller	
10	Sunday 24 November	New World Dart Series #3 – New Orleans	Hilton New Orleans Airport, New Orleans, Louisiana, United States	Darin Young (United States)	?-?	(United States) Ralph McCool	

References for the dates, tournament names and venues in the table

== Australian Grand Prix Pro Tour ==
The Australian Grand Prix rankings are calculated from events across Australia. The top player in the rankings automatically qualifies for the 2014 World Championship.

No.	Date	Also known as	Winner	Legs	Runner-up	Ref.
1	Saturday 2 February	Mittagong RSL Open 1	Kyle Anderson (Australia)	6–2	(Australia) John Bunyard	
2	Sunday 3 February	Mittagong RSL Open 2	Kyle Anderson (Australia)	6–0	(Australia) Sonny Turner	
3	Saturday 16 February	DPA Australian Matchplay 1	Kyle Anderson (Australia)	6–3	(Australia) Bill Aitken	
4	Saturday 2 March	Redcliffe Darts Open 1	Tic Bridge (Australia)	6–4	(Australia) Steve Duke	
5	Sunday 3 March	Redcliffe Darts Open 2	Tic Bridge (Australia)	6–1	(Australia) Craig Gwynne	
6	Saturday 16 March	Dosh Perth Open 1	David Platt (Australia)	6–4	(Australia) Adam Rowe	
7	Sunday 17 March	Dosh Perth Open 2	Laurence Ryder (Australia)	6–3	(Australia) Conan Ugle	
8	Saturday 7 April	Victoria Open 1	Kyle Anderson (Australia)	6–3	(Republic of Ireland) Shane O'Connor	
9	Sunday 8 April	Victoria Open 2	Kyle Anderson (Australia)	6–3	(Republic of Ireland) Shane O'Connor	
10	Saturday 11 May	Russell Stewart Classic	Gordon Mathers (Australia)	6–5	(Australia) Kyle Anderson	
11	Sunday 12 May	DPA Australian Singles	Gordon Mathers (Australia)	6–3	(Australia) Kyle Anderson	
12	Saturday 25 May	Redcliffe Darts Open 3	Pat Orreal (Australia)	6–5	(Australia) Kyle Anderson	
13	Sunday 26 May	Redcliffe Darts Open 4	Russell Homer (Australia)	6–2	(Australia) Darren Kirk	
14	Saturday 22 June	Nerang Open 1	Kyle Anderson (Australia)	6–2	(Australia) Tic Bridge	
15	Sunday 23 June	Nerang Open 2	James Bailey (Australia)	6–2	(Australia) Rob Modra	
16	Saturday 13 July	SID Darts Open	Gordon Mathers (Australia)	6–3	(Australia) Kyle Anderson	
17	Sunday 14 July	Warilla Bowls Club Open	Kyle Anderson (Australia)	6–5	(Australia) Jamie Rundle	
18	Saturday 3 August	Dosh Perth Open 3	Chad Stack (Australia)	6–5	(Australia) Beau Anderson	
19	Sunday 4 August	Dosh Perth Open 4	Steve MacArthur (Australia)	6–3	(Australia) Gordon Mathers	
20	Sunday 25 August	Sydney Masters Qualifier 1	Beau Anderson (Australia)	6–5	(Australia) Ben Gaiter	
21	Monday 26 August	Sydney Masters Qualifier 2	Monty Tuhua (New Zealand)	6–4	(Australia) Kerry Whear	
22	Tuesday 27 August	Sydney Masters Qualifier 3	David Platt (Australia)	6–2	(Australia) Raymond Kingston	
23	Wednesday 28 August	Sydney Masters Qualifier 4	Jamie Mathers (Australia)	6–3	(England) Wayne Clegg	
24	Sunday 1 September	DPA Tournament of Champions	Simon Whitlock (Australia)	6–5	(United States) John Kuczynski	

== Other PDC tournaments ==
The PDC also held a number of other tournaments during 2013. These were mainly smaller events with low prize money, and some had eligibility restrictions. All of these tournaments were non-ranking.

Date	Event	Winner	Score	Runner-Up	Ref.
July 14	New Zealand Championship	(New Zealand) Rob Szabo	3–2	(New Zealand) Mike Day	
August 28	Oceanic Masters	(Australia) Beau Anderson	6–4	(Australia) Tic Bridge	
September 29	South African Masters	(South Africa) Devon Petersen	9–3	(South Africa) Graham Filby	
September 29	PDC World South Asian Qualifying Event	(Malaysia) Mohd Latif Sapup	beat	(Malaysia) Kesava Rao	
October 13	Tom Kirby Memorial Irish Matchplay	(Northern Ireland) Colin McGarry	6–4	(Republic of Ireland) Connie Finnan	
October 18	Gleneagle Irish Masters	(England) Darren Webster	6–2	(England) Joe Cullen	
October 20	PDC World Philippines Qualifying Event	(Philippines) Edward Santos	beat	(Philippines) Alexis Toylo	
October 26	PDC World China Qualifying Event	(Hong Kong) Royden Lam	5–0	(China) Deng Yin	
November 1	Bull's Super League Darts Iberia	(Spain) Julio Barbero	10–9	(Gibraltar) Dylan Duo	
November 3	PDJ Japanese Qualifier	(Japan) Morihiro Hashimoto	6–5	(Japan) Haruki Muramatsu	
November 10	PDC World West European Qualifying Event	(Netherlands) Gino Vos	6–3	(Netherlands) Dick van Dijk	
November 16	Bull's Super League Germany	(Germany) Andree Welge	10–7	(Austria) Maik Langendorf	
November 16	Bull's Super League Eastern Europe	(Austria) Mensur Suljović	10–4	(Austria) Zoran Lerchbacher	
November 25	PDC World Darts Championship PDPA Qualifier	(England) Matt Clark	5–0	(England) Ian Moss	
