= 2014 PDC World Darts Championship =

2014 Ladbrokes World Darts Championship

Tournament information
- Dates: 13 December 2013 – 1 January 2014
- Venue: Alexandra Palace
- Location: London, England
- Organisation(s): Professional Darts Corporation (PDC)
- Format: Legs (preliminaries); Sets (from Round 1); Final – first to 7
- Prize fund: £1,050,000
- Winner's share: £250,000
- Nine-dart finish: Terry Jenkins; Kyle Anderson
- High checkout: 170; Terry Jenkins; Wes Newton

Champion(s)
- Michael van Gerwen (NED)

The 2014 PDC World Darts Championship (known for sponsorship reasons as the 2014 Ladbrokes World Darts Championship) was the twenty-first World Championship organised by the Professional Darts Corporation since it separated from the British Darts Organisation. The event took place at the Alexandra Palace, London from 13 December 2013 to 1 January 2014.

Phil Taylor was the defending champion, having won his 16th title in 2013, but he lost 4–3 to Michael Smith in the second round.

Terry Jenkins and Kyle Anderson recorded both televised nine-dart finishes during the event, in their first-round matches against Per Laursen and Ian White, respectively.

Michael van Gerwen won his first World Championship by defeating Peter Wright 7–4 in the final. He became the sixth winner of the event and, at the age of 24, the youngest. The result also saw him replace Taylor as the new world number one. A new record of 603 maximum 180 scores were made during the championship, beating the previous best of 588 set in 2012. For the first time in PDC history, there was no Englishman in the final.

== Format and qualifiers ==
The televised stages featured 72 players. The top 32 players in the PDC Order of Merit on 26 November 2013 were seeded for the tournament. They were joined by the 16 highest non-qualified players from the Pro Tour Order of Merit, based on the events played on the 2013 PDC Pro Tour.

These 48 players were joined by two PDPA qualifiers (as determined at the PDPA Qualifying event held in Barnsley on 25 November 2013), the highest ranked non-qualified player on the PDC Challenge Tour Order of Merit, and 21 international players: the four highest names in the European Order of Merit not already qualified, and 17 further international qualifiers to be determined by the PDC and PDPA.

Some of the international players, such as the four from the European Order of Merit, and the top American and Australian players were entered straight into the first round, while others, having won qualifying events in their countries, were entered into the preliminary round.

Order of Merit

1. (England) Phil Taylor
2. (Netherlands) Michael van Gerwen
3. (England) Adrian Lewis
4. (Australia) Simon Whitlock
5. (England) Andy Hamilton
6. (England) James Wade
7. (England) Dave Chisnall
8. (England) Wes Newton
9. (Scotland) Robert Thornton
10. (Netherlands) Raymond van Barneveld
11. (England) Justin Pipe
12. (Belgium) Kim Huybrechts
13. (England) Kevin Painter
14. (England) Mervyn King
15. (Northern Ireland) Brendan Dolan
16. (Scotland) Peter Wright
17. (England) Terry Jenkins
18. (Scotland) Gary Anderson
19. (England) Ronnie Baxter
20. (Australia) Paul Nicholson
21. (England) Ian White
22. (England) Steve Beaton
23. (England) Jamie Caven
24. (England) Colin Lloyd
25. (Canada) John Part
26. (Wales) Mark Webster
27. (England) Andy Smith
28. (Wales) Richie Burnett
29. (England) Mark Walsh
30. (Netherlands) Vincent van der Voort
31. (England) Wayne Jones
32. (England) Michael Smith

Pro Tour

1. (England) Stuart Kellett
2. (Netherlands) Jelle Klaasen
3. (Wales) Jamie Lewis
4. (England) Darren Webster
5. (Belgium) Ronny Huybrechts
6. (England) Joe Cullen
7. (England) Arron Monk
8. (Austria) Mensur Suljović
9. (Scotland) John Henderson
10. (England) Dennis Smith
11. (England) Ricky Evans
12. (England) Kevin McDine
13. (England) Dean Winstanley
14. (England) Ross Smith
15. (England) Mark Dudbridge
16. (England) Steve Brown

European Order of Merit
First round qualifiers

- (Germany) Max Hopp
- (Netherlands) Mareno Michels
- (Finland) Jarkko Komula
- (Germany) Tomas Seyler

PDPA Qualifier
First round qualifier

- (England) Matt Clark

Preliminary round qualifier

- (England) Ian Moss

Challenge Tour Qualifier
Preliminary round qualifier

- (England) Ben Ward

International qualifiers
First round qualifiers

- (United States) Darin Young
- (Australia) Beau Anderson
- (Australia) Kyle Anderson

Preliminary round qualifiers

- (Spain) Julio Barbero
- (Japan) Morihiro Hashimoto
- (Hong Kong) Royden Lam
- (Malaysia) Mohd Latif Sapup
- (Denmark) Per Laursen
- (Austria) Zoran Lerchbacher
- (Singapore) Paul Lim
- (Denmark) Dennis Lindskjold
- (Northern Ireland) Colin McGarry
- (South Africa) Devon Petersen
- (Philippines) ~~Edward Santos~~
- (New Zealand) Rob Szabo
- (Netherlands) Gino Vos
- (Germany) Andree Welge
- (England) Colin Osborne

Edward Santos withdrew due to travel problems and was replaced by Colin Osborne, the highest-ranking non-qualified player on the PDC Order of Merit.

== Prize money ==
The 2014 World Championship features a prize fund of at least £1,050,000. The winner's prize money has been increased from £200,000 to £250,000.

The prize money is allocated as follows:

Position (num. of players)		Prize money (Total: £1,050,000)
Winner	(1)	£250,000
Runner-Up	(1)	£100,000
Semi-finalists	(2)	£50,000
Quarter-finalists	(4)	£25,000
Third round losers	(8)	£15,000
Second round losers	(16)	£10,000
First round losers	(32)	£6,000
Preliminary round losers	(8)	£3,500
Nine-dart finish	(2)	£30,000 (£15,000 each)

== Bracket ==
The preliminary round was drawn on 30 November, the last 64 draw took place on 2 December 2013 and was made by Rod Harrington and Wayne Mardle. It was shown live on Sky Sports.

=== Preliminary round ===
The preliminary round was played in a first to four legs format. One match was played per session with the winners playing their first-round matches later on the same day.

Av.	Player	Score	Player	Av.
76.78	Rob Szabo (New Zealand)	4–3	(England) Ian Moss	78.63
84.71	Colin McGarry (Northern Ireland)	2–4	(Denmark) Per Laursen	91.55
84.03	Julio Barbero (Spain)	4–1	(Germany) Andree Welge	79.65
74.30	Dennis Lindskjold (Denmark)	1–4	(England) Colin Osborne	89.82
88.01	Devon Petersen (South Africa)	4–1	(Malaysia) Mohd Latif Sapup	82.78
90.25	Zoran Lerchbacher (Austria)	4–1	(England) Ben Ward	86.43
84.26	Morihiro Hashimoto (Japan)	4–2	(Singapore) Paul Lim	75.26
79.45	Gino Vos (Netherlands)	1–4	(Hong Kong) Royden Lam	79.40

=== Last 64 ===
==== Finals ====
Quarter-finals (best of 9 sets); 28–29 December
16	(Scotland) Peter Wright 95.85	5
8	(England) Wes Newton 92.40	4
21	(England) Ian White 98.41	4
4	(Australia) Simon Whitlock 95.77	5
2	(Netherlands) Michael van Gerwen 98.86	5
26	(Wales) Mark Webster 93.34	3
6	(England) James Wade 90.85	1
3	(England) Adrian Lewis 96.56	5

Semi-finals (best of 11 sets); 30 December
16	(Scotland) Peter Wright 100.24	6
4	(Australia) Simon Whitlock 97.25	2
2	(Netherlands) Michael van Gerwen 103.02	6
3	(England) Adrian Lewis 99.19	0

Final (best of 13 sets); 1 January
16	(Scotland) Peter Wright 95.71	4
2	(Netherlands) Michael van Gerwen 100.10	7

==== Rounds 1–4 ====
First round (best of 5 sets); 13–19 December
1	(England) Phil Taylor 96.68	3
(New Zealand) Rob Szabo 90.06	1
32	(England) Michael Smith 79.69	3
(Japan) Morihiro Hashimoto 76.50	1
16	(Scotland) Peter Wright 98.68	3
(England) Joe Cullen 90.83	0
17	(England) Terry Jenkins 95.91	2
(Denmark) Per Laursen 89.45	3
8	(England) Wes Newton 88.41	3
(Hong Kong) Royden Lam 83.45	1
25	(Canada) John Part 82.48	3
(Netherlands) Mareno Michels 79.70	2
9	(Scotland) Robert Thornton 86.86	3
(Germany) Max Hopp 80.17	1
24	(England) Colin Lloyd 83.62	2
(Australia) Beau Anderson 83.66	3
5	(England) Andy Hamilton 92.03	3
(Spain) Julio Barbero 93.52	1
28	(Wales) Richie Burnett 97.19	3
(England) Dean Winstanley 95.48	1
12	(Belgium) Kim Huybrechts 88.07	3
(Belgium) Ronny Huybrechts 90.10	1
21	(England) Ian White 97.02	3
(Australia) Kyle Anderson 89.68	1
4	(Australia) Simon Whitlock 97.35	3
(England) Ross Smith 86.20	0
29	(England) Mark Walsh 86.51	1
(Finland) Jarkko Komula 84.57	3
13	(England) Kevin Painter 98.59	3
(Germany) Tomas Seyler 86.98	0
20	(Australia) Paul Nicholson 96.82	3
(England) Stuart Kellett 95.09	0
2	(Netherlands) Michael van Gerwen 89.13	3
(Austria) Zoran Lerchbacher 89.94	0
31	(England) Wayne Jones 89.75	2
(England) Kevin McDine 91.80	3
15	(Northern Ireland) Brendan Dolan 96.72	3
(England) Colin Osborne 82.64	0
18	(Scotland) Gary Anderson 97.83	3
(England) Mark Dudbridge 90.40	0
7	(England) Dave Chisnall 98.43	2
(Scotland) John Henderson 91.62	3
26	(Wales) Mark Webster 86.70	3
(Austria) Mensur Suljović 84.02	2
10	(Netherlands) Raymond van Barneveld 98.56	3
(Wales) Jamie Lewis 91.02	0
23	(England) Jamie Caven 87.03	3
(Netherlands) Jelle Klaasen 89.56	1
6	(England) James Wade 91.92	3
(England) Darren Webster 90.12	2
27	(England) Andy Smith 84.22	3
(England) Steve Brown 84.89	1
11	(England) Justin Pipe 87.85	3
(England) Arron Monk 78.74	0
22	(England) Steve Beaton 87.76	1
(South Africa) Devon Petersen 85.67	3
3	(England) Adrian Lewis 95.26	3
(England) Dennis Smith 80.89	0
30	(Netherlands) Vincent van der Voort 85.96	3
(England) Matt Clark 78.50	1
14	(England) Mervyn King 89.87	3
(United States) Darin Young 82.97	0
19	(England) Ronnie Baxter 86.60	0
(England) Ricky Evans 87.21	3

Second round (best of 7 sets); 20–27 December
1	(England) Taylor 95.55	3
32	(England) M. Smith 94.55	4
16	(Scotland) Wright 98.04	4
(Denmark) Laursen 87.63	2
8	(England) Newton 92.91	4
25	(Canada) Part 87.89	0
9	(Scotland) Thornton 98.89	4
(Australia) B. Anderson 87.76	0
5	(England) Hamilton 96.89	1
28	(Wales) Burnett 95.91	4
12	(Belgium) K. Huybrechts 98.94	3
21	(England) White 98.39	4
4	(Australia) Whitlock 95.30	4
(Finland) Komula 88.99	0
13	(England) Painter 91.59	4
20	(Australia) Nicholson 93.60	0
2	(Netherlands) van Gerwen 96.88	4
(England) McDine 90.11	1
15	(Northern Ireland) Dolan 90.10	1
18	(Scotland) G. Anderson 97.97	4
(Scotland) Henderson 91.62	3
26	(Wales) M. Webster 92.23	4
10	(Netherlands) van Barneveld 99.65	4
23	(England) Caven 96.05	3
6	(England) Wade 91.86	4
27	(England) A. Smith 90.04	3
11	(England) Pipe 93.00	1
(South Africa) Petersen 95.18	4
3	(England) A. Lewis 103.68	4
30	(Netherlands) van der Voort 99.47	1
14	(England) King 94.81	4
(England) Evans 94.40	2

Third round (best of 7 sets); 27–28 December
32	(England) M. Smith 98.33	3
16	(Scotland) Wright 105.07	4
8	(England) Newton 95.51	4
9	(Scotland) Thornton 91.74	1
28	(Wales) Burnett 95.83	3
21	(England) White 95.92	4
4	(Australia) Whitlock 92.96	4
13	(England) Painter 86.38	0
2	(Netherlands) van Gerwen 100.20	4
18	(Scotland) G. Anderson 98.18	3
26	(Wales) M. Webster 92.48	4
10	(Netherlands) van Barneveld 94.82	3
6	(England) Wade 99.92	4
(South Africa) Petersen 92.42	0
3	(England) A. Lewis 91.17	4
14	(England) King 91.87	1

Quarter-finals (best of 9 sets); 28–29 December
16	(Scotland) Wright 95.85	5
8	(England) Newton 92.40	4
21	(England) White 98.41	4
4	(Australia) Whitlock 95.77	5
2	(Netherlands) van Gerwen 98.86	5
26	(Wales) M. Webster 93.34	3
6	(England) Wade 90.85	1
3	(England) A. Lewis 96.56	5

== Final ==
Final: Best of 13 sets. Referee: Russ Bray; Alexandra Palace, London, England, 1 January 2014.
(16) Peter Wright (Scotland)	4 – 7	(Netherlands) Michael van Gerwen (2)
1 – 3, 0 – 3, 0 – 3, 1 – 3, 3 – 1, 3 – 1, 2 – 3, 1 – 3, 3 – 1, 3 – 1, 2 – 3
95.71	Average (3 darts)	100.10
6	180 scores	16
130	Highest checkout	124
36.54% (19/52)	Checkout summary	39.06% (25/64)

== Statistics ==
Player	Eliminated	Played	Sets Won	Sets Lost	Legs Won	Legs Lost	100+	140+	180s	High checkout	Average
(Netherlands) Michael van Gerwen	Winner	6	29	11	100	62	186	104	52	154	98.03
(Scotland) Peter Wright	Runner-up	6	26	18	103	86	290	154	29	164	98.93
(England) Adrian Lewis	Semi-finals	5	16	9	56	41	107	79	29	158	97.17
(Australia) Simon Whitlock	Semi-finals	5	18	10	66	53	139	84	36	136	95.73
(England) Ian White	Quarter-finals	4	15	12	61	51	150	75	29	128	97.44
(England) James Wade	Quarter-finals	4	12	10	52	47	136	66	21	142	93.64
(England) Wes Newton	Quarter-finals	4	15	7	57	39	107	60	27	170	92.13
(Wales) Mark Webster	Quarter-finals	4	14	13	59	56	135	73	25	157	91.19
(Scotland) Gary Anderson	Third round	3	10	5	39	26	90	50	17	119	98.00
(Netherlands) Raymond van Barneveld	Third round	3	10	7	40	32	98	50	20	141	97.68
(Wales) Richie Burnett	Third round	3	10	6	34	32	77	57	19	96	96.31
(Scotland) Robert Thornton	Third round	3	8	5	28	22	70	38	16	136	92.50
(England) Kevin Painter	Third round	3	7	4	25	18	50	31	7	116	92.19
(England) Mervyn King	Third round	3	8	6	29	25	63	48	12	136	92.18
(England) Michael Smith	Third round	3	10	8	41	38	95	59	17	141	90.86
(South Africa) Devon Petersen	Third round	4	7	6	32	29	87	48	9	141	90.32
(England) Phil Taylor	Second round	2	6	5	24	23	60	35	10	156	96.12
(Australia) Paul Nicholson	Second round	2	3	4	14	15	36	28	7	136	95.21
(England) Andy Hamilton	Second round	2	4	5	19	19	45	25	8	124	94.46
(Belgium) Kim Huybrechts	Second round	2	6	5	23	24	51	35	10	111	93.51
(Northern Ireland) Brendan Dolan	Second round	2	4	4	16	18	49	20	7	167	93.41
(Netherlands) Vincent van der Voort	Second round	2	4	5	18	18	43	24	7	131	92.72
(Scotland) John Henderson	Second round	2	6	6	28	29	83	29	15	132	91.62
(England) Jamie Caven	Second round	2	6	5	23	22	44	31	7	158	91.54
(England) Kevin McDine	Second round	2	4	6	18	22	44	15	13	81	90.96
(England) Ricky Evans	Second round	2	5	4	20	17	45	20	13	138	90.81
(England) Justin Pipe	Second round	2	4	4	17	15	48	25	3	110	90.43
(Denmark) Per Laursen	Second round	3	5	6	23	28	64	29	10	128	89.54
(England) Andy Smith	Second round	2	6	5	25	25	74	37	7	161	87.14
(Finland) Jarkko Komula	Second round	2	3	5	16	20	54	20	7	126	86.78
(Australia) Beau Anderson	Second round	2	3	6	17	25	52	25	7	76	85.71
(Canada) John Part	Second round	2	3	6	17	22	35	15	8	76	85.19
(England) Dave Chisnall	First round	1	2	3	11	13	24	15	11	121	98.43
(England) Terry Jenkins	First round	1	2	3	11	10	20	13	11	170	95.91
(England) Dean Winstanley	First round	1	1	3	9	9	29	14	2	60	95.48
(England) Stuart Kellett	First round	1	0	3	3	9	10	9	4	84	95.09
(Wales) Jamie Lewis	First round	1	0	3	3	9	13	9	3	84	91.02
(England) Joe Cullen	First round	1	0	3	5	9	18	7	1	147	90.83
(England) Mark Dudbridge	First round	1	0	3	3	9	14	5	1	41	90.40
(England) Darren Webster	First round	1	2	3	11	13	31	21	1	81	90.12
(Belgium) Ronny Huybrechts	First round	1	1	3	7	10	23	12	3	97	90.10
(Austria) Zoran Lerchbacher	First round	2	0	3	5	10	26	11	1	138	90.10
(England) Wayne Jones	First round	1	2	3	8	12	30	11	5	120	89.75
(Australia) Kyle Anderson	First round	1	1	3	5	10	6	9	6	141	89.68
(Netherlands) Jelle Klaasen	First round	1	1	3	4	9	19	6	3	36	89.56
(Spain) Julio Barbero	First round	2	1	3	10	12	22	19	4	80	88.78
(England) Steve Beaton	First round	1	1	3	8	10	20	14	2	106	87.76
(Germany) Tomas Seyler	First round	1	0	3	1	9	15	7	1	56	86.98
(England) Ronnie Baxter	First round	1	0	3	3	9	19	7	1	40	86.60
(England) Mark Walsh	First round	1	1	3	8	11	37	14	0	121	86.51
(England) Colin Osborne	First round	2	0	3	8	10	15	13	1	122	86.23
(England) Ross Smith	First round	1	0	3	4	9	21	6	2	107	86.20
(England) Steve Brown	First round	1	1	3	7	10	14	8	8	56	84.89
(Austria) Mensur Suljović	First round	1	2	3	10	13	26	15	4	130	84.02
(England) Colin Lloyd	First round	1	2	3	13	15	42	10	5	112	83.62
(New Zealand) Rob Szabo	First round	2	1	3	10	13	34	5	2	128	83.42
(United States) Darin Young	First round	1	0	3	1	9	14	4	1	14	82.97
(Hong Kong) Royden Lam	First round	2	1	3	11	11	34	13	1	60	81.43
(England) Dennis Smith	First round	1	0	3	0	9	10	3	1	–	80.89
(Japan) Morihiro Hashimoto	First round	2	1	3	11	12	37	9	2	152	80.38
(Germany) Max Hopp	First round	1	1	3	6	10	21	4	4	68	80.17
(Netherlands) Mareno Michels	First round	1	2	3	10	13	28	11	4	136	79.70
(England) Arron Monk	First round	1	0	3	3	9	13	5	0	100	78.64
(England) Matt Clark	First round	1	1	3	6	10	22	5	1	81	78.50
(England) Ben Ward	Preliminary round	1	0	0	1	4	11	2	0	16	86.43
(Northern Ireland) Colin McGarry	Preliminary round	1	0	0	2	4	4	6	1	36	84.71
(Malaysia) Mohd Latif Sapup	Preliminary round	1	0	0	1	4	7	5	0	141	82.78
(Germany) Andree Welge	Preliminary round	1	0	0	1	4	6	2	1	91	79.65
(Netherlands) Gino Vos	Preliminary round	1	0	0	1	4	4	2	0	32	79.45
(England) Ian Moss	Preliminary round	1	0	0	3	4	12	3	0	118	78.63
(Singapore) Paul Lim	Preliminary round	1	0	0	2	4	8	4	0	58	75.26
(Denmark) Dennis Lindskjold	Preliminary round	1	0	0	1	4	10	0	0	2	74.30

Source: Match reports in the draw

== Representation from different countries ==
This table shows the number of players by country in the World Championship, the total number including the preliminary round.

	(England) ENG	(Netherlands) NED	(Australia) AUS	(Scotland) SCO	(Wales) WAL	(Germany) GER	(Belgium) BEL	(Northern Ireland) NIR	(Austria) AUT	(Denmark) DEN	(Canada) CAN	(United States) USA	(Spain) SPA	(Hong Kong) HKG	(Japan) JPN	(Malaysia) MAS	(New Zealand) NZL	(South Africa) RSA	(Singapore) SIN	(Finland) FIN	Total
Final	0	1	0	1	0	0	0	0	0	0	0	0	0	0	0	0	0	0	0	0	2
Semis	1	1	1	1	0	0	0	0	0	0	0	0	0	0	0	0	0	0	0	0	4
Quarters	4	1	1	1	1	0	0	0	0	0	0	0	0	0	0	0	0	0	0	0	8
Round 3	7	2	1	3	2	0	0	0	0	0	0	0	0	0	0	0	0	1	0	0	16
Round 2	14	3	3	4	2	0	1	1	0	1	1	0	0	0	0	0	0	1	0	1	32
Round 1	32	5	4	4	3	2	2	1	2	1	1	1	1	1	1	0	1	1	0	1	64
Prelim.	3	1	0	0	0	1	0	1	1	2	0	0	1	1	1	1	1	1	1	0	16
Total	34	6	4	4	3	3	2	2	2	2	1	1	1	1	1	1	1	1	1	1	72

== Broadcasting ==
The tournament was available in the following countries on these channels:

Country	Channel
United Kingdom	Sky Sports; BBC Radio 5 Live (final only)
Czech Republic; Hungary; Romania; Slovakia	Sport TV (Sport 1 and Sport 2)
Germany	Sport1/Sport1+
(Republic of Ireland) Ireland	Sky Sports
Middle East	OSN
Netherlands	RTL 7
Australia; Italy	Fox Sports
New Zealand	Sky Sport

Sky Sports also showed the semi-finals and final in 3D in the United Kingdom.
