= 2012 UK Open Qualifier 7 =

UK Open Qualifier 7

Tournament information
- Dates: Saturday 5 May
- Venue: NIA Community Hall
- Location: Birmingham
- Country: England
- Organisation(s): PDC
- Format: Best of 11 legs
- Prize fund: £34,600
- Winner's share: £6,000

Champion(s)
- (England) Terry Jenkins

The 2012 UK Open Qualifier 7 was the seventh of eight 2012 UK Open Darts Qualifiers which was held at the NIA Community Hall in Birmingham on Saturday 5 May.

== Prize money ==
Stage	Prize money (Total-£34,600)
Winner	£6,000
Runner Up	£3,000
Semi Final	£2,000
Quarter Final	£1,000
Fourth Round	£600
Third Round	£400
Second Round	£200
First Round	£0
Preliminary Round	£0

== Draw ==
Second round
(England)	John Scott	3
(England)	Michael Smith	6
(Netherlands)	Toon Greebe	4
(England)	Adrian Lewis	6
(Canada)	John Part	3
(England)	Andy Smith	6
(England)	James Hubbard	5
(England)	Dave Chisnall	6
(England)	Shaun Griffiths	6
(England)	Tony Littleton	5
(England)	Richie Howson	6
(Netherlands)	Jelle Klaasen	5
(South Africa)	Devon Petersen	6
(England)	Andy Brown	4
(England)	Mick Todd	5
(England)	Alex Roy	6
(England)	Colin Lloyd	6
(England)	Andy Jenkins	4
(England)	James Wade	6
(England)	Dave Honey	2
(England)	Daniel Day	6
(Republic of Ireland)	Paddy Meaney	3
(England)	Mervyn King	6
(England)	Patrick Pace	1
(England)	Jon Bott	0
(England)	Terry Jenkins	6
(England)	Philip Wathen	1
(Belgium)	Kim Huybrechts	6
(England)	Chris Mason	3
(England)	Steve Beaton	6
(Scotland)	Keith Stephen	1
(England)	Colin Osborne	6
(England)	Darren Webster	6
(England)	Alan Tabern	3
(Germany)	Michael Rosenauer	3
(Wales)	Mark Webster	6
(England)	Brandon Walsh	3
(Northern Ireland)	Michael Mansell	6
(England)	Mark Lawrence	2
(Scotland)	Robert Thornton	6
(England)	Gareth Cousins	6
(England)	Joe Murnan	4
(Scotland)	Gary Anderson	6
(England)	Ian White	3
(Sweden)	Magnus Caris	2
(England)	Andy Hamilton	6
(Gibraltar)	Dyson Parody	4
(England)	Stuart Kellett	6
(England)	James Richardson	1
(England)	Jamie Caven	6
(England)	Peter Hudson	3
(Australia)	Simon Whitlock	6
(Netherlands)	Mareno Michels	6
(England)	Arron Monk	4
(England)	Mark Hylton	5
(England)	Andrew Gilding	6
(England)	Sam Hill	5
(England)	Steve Grubb	6
(England)	Kevin Painter	6
(Wales)	Jamie Lewis	0
(England)	Dean Winstanley	6
(England)	Darren Latham	4
(Northern Ireland)	Brendan Dolan	6
(England)	Darren Johnson	1

Third round
(England)	Michael Smith	5
(England)	Adrian Lewis	6
(England)	Andy Smith	2
(England)	Dave Chisnall	6
(England)	Shaun Griffiths	6
(England)	Richie Howson	3
(South Africa)	Devon Petersen	6
(England)	Alex Roy	1
(England)	Colin Lloyd	6
(England)	James Wade	0
(England)	Daniel Day	3
(England)	Mervyn King	6
(England)	Terry Jenkins	6
(Belgium)	Kim Huybrechts	4
(England)	Steve Beaton	4
(England)	Colin Osborne	6
(England)	Darren Webster	4
(Wales)	Mark Webster	6
(Northern Ireland)	Michael Mansell	4
(Scotland)	Robert Thornton	6
(England)	Gareth Cousins	1
(Scotland)	Gary Anderson	6
(England)	Andy Hamilton	6
(England)	Stuart Kellett	5
(England)	Jamie Caven	5
(Australia)	Simon Whitlock	6
(Netherlands)	Mareno Michels	2
(England)	Andrew Gilding	6
(England)	Steve Grubb	2
(England)	Kevin Painter	6
(England)	Dean Winstanley	6
(Northern Ireland)	Brendan Dolan	2

Fourth round
(England)	Adrian Lewis	2
(England)	Dave Chisnall	6
(England)	Shaun Griffiths	6
(South Africa)	Devon Petersen	2
(England)	Colin Lloyd	6
(England)	Mervyn King	1
(England)	Terry Jenkins	6
(England)	Colin Osborne	1
(Wales)	Mark Webster	5
(Scotland)	Robert Thornton	6
(Scotland)	Gary Anderson	4
(England)	Andy Hamilton	6
(Australia)	Simon Whitlock	5
(England)	Andrew Gilding	6
(England)	Kevin Painter	6
(England)	Dean Winstanley	5

Quarter-finals
(England)	Dave Chisnall	6
(England)	Shaun Griffiths	3
(England)	Colin Lloyd	2
(England)	Terry Jenkins	6
(Scotland)	Robert Thornton	2
(England)	Andy Hamilton	6
(England)	Andrew Gilding	3
(England)	Kevin Painter	6

Semi-finals
(England)	Dave Chisnall	5
(England)	Terry Jenkins	6
(England)	Andy Hamilton	6
(England)	Kevin Painter	3

Final
(England)	Terry Jenkins	6
(England)	Andy Hamilton	3
