= Ricky Evans (darts player) =

English darts player (born 1990)

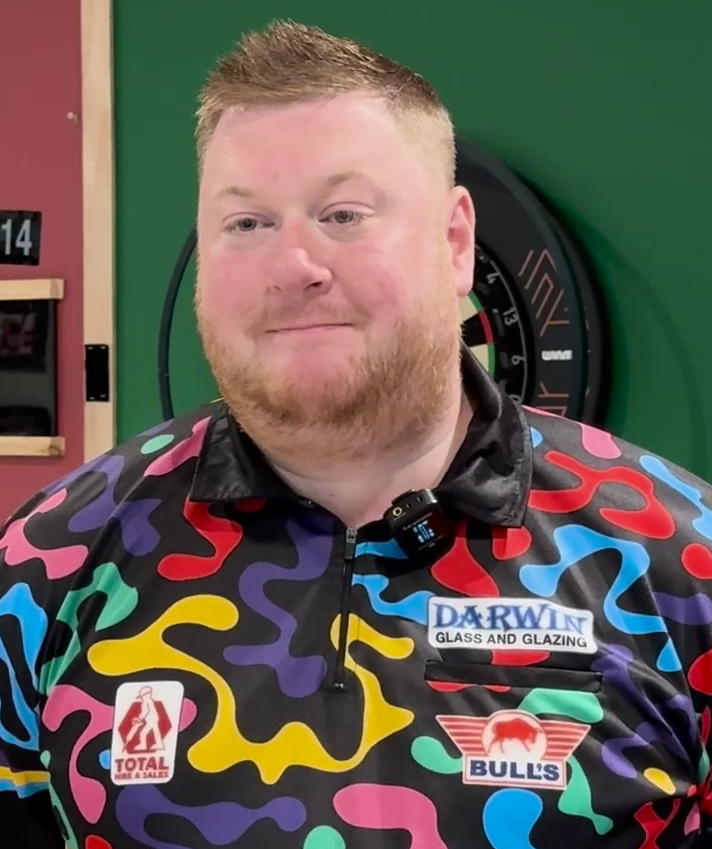
- Evans in 2026

Personal information
- Nickname: "Rapid Ricky"
- Born: 29 July 1990 (age 36) Kettering, Northamptonshire, England

Sport
- Sport: Darts
- Playing since: 2005
- Darts: 20g Bull's NL Signature
- Laterality: Right-handed
- Walk-on music: "Daydream Believer" by The Monkees "Merry Christmas Everyone" by Shakin' Stevens (pre-Christmas World Championship matches) " Wackelkontakt" by Oimara (European Tour)

Organisation (see split in darts)
- BDO: 2007–2013
- PDC: 2013–present (Tour Card: 2013–present)
- Current world ranking: (PDC) 52 (5 November 2026)

WDF major events – best performances
- World Masters: Last 48: 2012

PDC premier events – best performances
- World Championship: Last 32: 2014, 2016, 2020, 2021, 2024, 2025, 2026
- World Matchplay: Last 32: 2019, 2020
- World Grand Prix: Last 32: 2018, 2019
- UK Open: Semi-final: 2024
- Grand Slam: Quarter-final: 2025
- European Championship: Quarter-final: 2019
- PC Finals: Last 16: 2018
- World Series Finals: Last 24: 2019

Other tournament wins
- Years
PDC Development Tour	2011, 2013

Ricky Evans (born 29 July 1990) is an English professional darts player who competes in Professional Darts Corporation (PDC) events. Nicknamed "Rapid" due to his very fast throwing speed, he was a semi-finalist at the 2024 UK Open. Evans also made the quarter-finals at the 2019 European Championship and the 2025 Grand Slam. He is a six-time PDC Pro Tour finalist, including two finals on the PDC European Tour.

In his youth career, Evans won two titles on the PDC Development Tour, and was the runner-up at the 2013 PDC World Youth Championship.

== Career ==
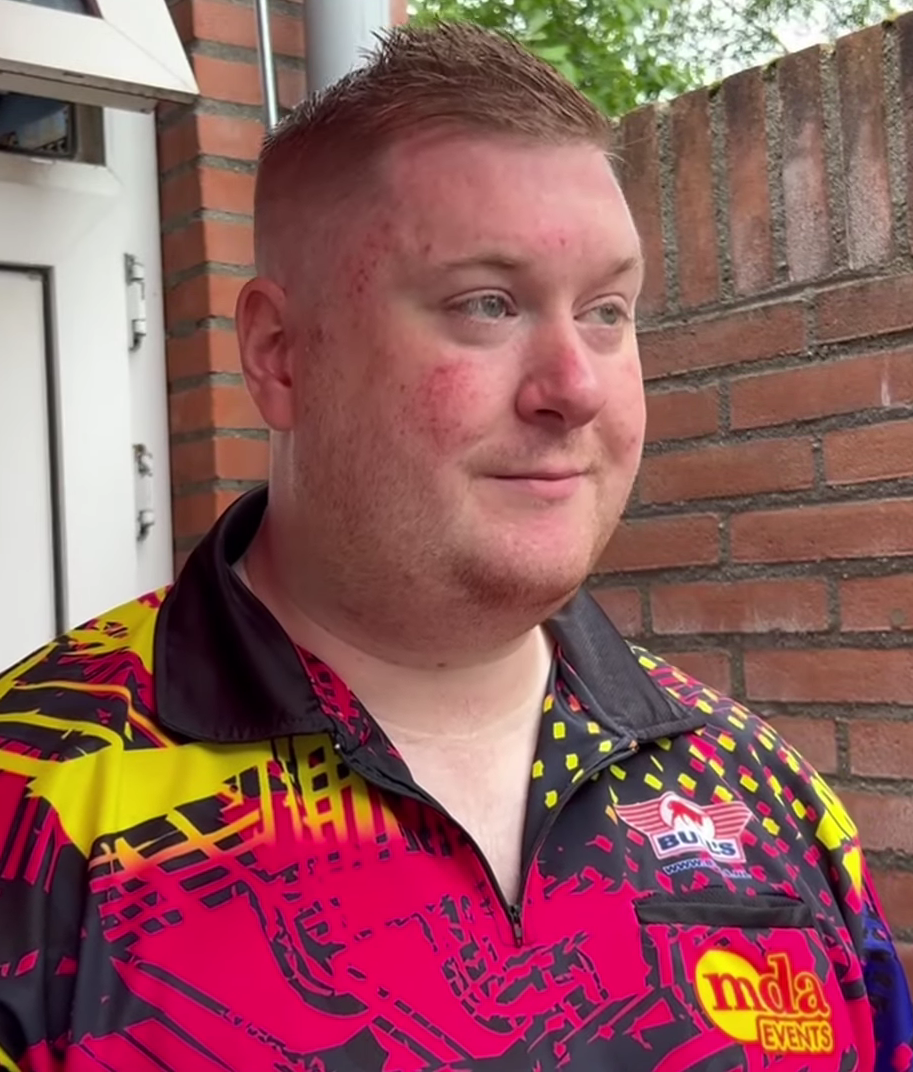
Evans in 2023

From 2007 to 2012 Evans attempted to qualify for each BDO World Championship but was unsuccessful. In 2011, Evans won a PDC Youth Tour event by beating David Coyne 4–1 in the final. He has played in the World Masters five times with his best finish coming in 2012 where he lost in the last 48 to James Wilson.

In 2013, Evans played in the Qualifying School to earn a tour card for the Professional Darts Corporation events and succeeded on the first day. Less than two months later he reached the quarter-finals of a PDC Pro Tour event for the first time by beating Gary Anderson 6–5 in the last 16 of the second UK Open Qualifier, before he lost 6–3 to Peter Wright. This saw him enter the UK Open in the second round stage where he was defeated 5–2 by Joe Cullen. Evans won through to the final of the World Under-21 World Championship which was played on the finals night of the Premier League Darts at the O2 Arena in London, with Evans losing 6–1 to Michael Smith. However, the result was enough to see him reach the Grand Slam of Darts for the first time, but he lost each of his Group E games to Raymond van Barneveld, Mervyn King and Tony O'Shea to finish bottom of the table.

Evans advanced to his first final in main PDC events at the 13th Players Championship of the year. He beat established players such as Gary Anderson, Ronnie Baxter, Jamie Caven and Ian White, before losing 6–3 against Brendan Dolan. Evans' successful debut season continued later in the month as he was a losing semi-finalist at the final Players Championship. He amassed £11,550 in ProTour events during the year which saw him qualify through the Order of Merit for his first PDC World Championship where he outplayed the experienced Baxter in the first round to win 3–0 in sets. Evans next faced 14th seed Mervyn King but ultimately fell to the veteran 4–2 in sets. After the match King praised Evans' performance and described him as "the future of our sport". Evans was ranked world number 56 after his debut season on the PDC tour.

He could not get beyond the last 128 in any of the six qualifiers for the 2014 UK Open, which resulted in his failure to qualify for the event. Evans' form improved as the year progressed by qualifying for the final two European Tour events. At the European Darts Grand Prix he beat Jelle Klaasen 6–3, but lost 6–5 against Vincent van der Voort in the second round and at the European Darts Trophy he was eliminated in the first round 6–5 by Klaasen. In November, Evans reached the last 16 for the only time this year at the 20th and final Players Championship where he lost 6–3 to Ian White.

At the second UK Open Qualifier of 2015, Evans progressed through to his first quarter-final in over a year where he lost 6–3 to Vincent van der Voort. He reached the third round of the UK Open for the first time by beating Mark Layton 5–3, but then lost 9–4 to James Wilson. A second quarter-final appearance this year came at the fifth Players Championship where, after defeating Colin Osborne, Andy Smith, Jamie Robinson and Devon Petersen, he lost 6–2 to Keegan Brown.

Evans won the qualifier for the 2016 World Championship with a 5–4 victory over Andy Boulton. He played 2010 runner-up Simon Whitlock in the first round and, having trailed 2–0 in sets and 2–0 in legs (surviving two match darts), Evans mounted a comeback to eventually win the match 3–2 with a 130 checkout. However, Evans lost 10 legs in a row in his second round match against Jamie Caven to be knocked out 4–0. A 9–5 victory over Andy Boulton saw Evans play in the fourth round of the UK Open for the first time, but he missed match darts against Darren Webster to lose 9–8 after leading 4–1 early on. A quarter-final appearance came at the seventh Players Championship event (lost 6–2 to Gerwyn Price) and he went one better at the 16th event to reach his first semi-final in nearly three years. He also missed double 12 for a nine darter during the day, before losing 6–4 to Steve West in the last four. These results have seen Evans qualify for the Players Championship Finals and he faced James Wade in the first round.

Evans' first round match with Michael Smith at the 2017 World Championship went to a deciding set in which he failed to win a leg to be beaten 3–2. He reached the semi-finals of the first UK Open Qualifier, but lost 6–4 to Adrian Lewis.

At the 2018 Dutch Darts Championship, Evans made his first PDC European Tour final, where he lost 8–5 to Ian White.

In 2019, he followed that up with another runner-up spot at Players Championship 6 before reaching his second European Tour final at the 2019 German Darts Championship, where he lost 8–6 to Daryl Gurney.

In March 2024, Evans reached his first premier event semi-final at the 2024 UK Open by defeating Rob Cross. He was defeated by Luke Humphries 11–2.

== Playing style ==
Evans is known for his incredible dart throwing speed, and has been described by Sky pundit Wayne Mardle as the quickest player he's ever seen. Evans will usually throw three darts within three to five seconds of approaching the oche unless changing position or going for a double, a trait which has led to his nickname of 'Rapid'.

During the 2017 World Championship, Evans hit a 180 in just 2.16 seconds during his first round match against Michael Smith.

== World Championship results ==
=== PDC World Championship ===
- 2014: Second round (lost to Mervyn King 2–4)
- 2016: Second round (lost to Jamie Caven 0–4)
- 2017: First round (lost to Michael Smith 2–3)
- 2019: First round (lost to Rowby-John Rodriguez 1–3)
- 2020: Third round (lost to Michael van Gerwen 0–4)
- 2021: Third round (lost to Michael van Gerwen 0–4)
- 2022: Second round (lost to Daryl Gurney 1–3)
- 2023: Second round (lost to Joe Cullen 1–3)
- 2024: Third round (lost to Daryl Gurney 2–4)
- 2025: Third round (lost to Robert Owen 2–4)
- 2026: Third round (lost to Charlie Manby 2–4)

== Performance timeline ==
Ricky Evans' performance timeline is as follows:

=== BDO ===
Tournament	2008	2009	2010	2011	2012
BDO Ranked televised events
World Masters	1R	3R	3R	2R	4R

=== PDC ===
Tournament	2010	2011	2012	2013	2014	2015	2016	2017	2018	2019	2020	2021	2022	2023	2024	2025	2026
PDC Ranked televised events
World Championship	BDO				2R	DNQ	2R	1R	DNQ	1R	3R	3R	2R	2R	3R	3R	3R
World Masters	Did not qualify															Prel.	Prel.
UK Open	2R	BDO		3R	DNQ	3R	4R	3R	4R	4R	5R	5R	6R	4R	SF	4R	4R
World Matchplay	BDO			Did not qualify						1R	1R	Did not qualify					
World Grand Prix	BDO			Did not qualify					1R	1R	Did not qualify						
European Championship	BDO			Did not qualify					2R	QF	Did not qualify						
Grand Slam	Did not qualify			RR	Did not qualify						RR	Did not qualify				QF	RR
Players Championship Finals	BDO			Did not qualify			1R	DNQ	3R	2R	1R	1R	1R	1R	1R	1R	DNQ
PDC Non-ranked televised events
World Series Finals	Not held					Did not qualify				1R	DNQ			2R	DNQ		
World Youth Championship	NH	DNP	2R	F	Did not participate												
Career statistics
Year-end ranking	NR			56	54	55	48	60	49	28	30	41	48	46	45	40	

==== European Tour ====
Season	1	2	3	4	5	6	7	8	9	10	11	12	13	14	15
2013	Did not qualify					GDC; 1R	GDM; 1R	DDM; DNQ							
2014	Did not qualify						EDG; 2R	EDT; 1R							
2015	Did not qualify			DDM; 2R	Did not qualify				EDG; 1R						
2016	DDM; 1R	Did not qualify					IDO; 1R	EDT; 2R	DNQ						
2017	GDC; DNQ	GDM; 1R	Did not qualify									IDO; DNQ	EDT; 1R		
2018	Did not qualify				EDG; 1R	DDM; 1R	GDT; DNQ	DDO; 3R	EDM; DNQ	GDC; 2R	DDC; F	IDO; DNQ	EDT; 2R		
2019	EDO; DNQ	GDC; F	GDG; 3R	GDO; DNQ	ADO; 2R	EDG; 2R	DDM; 3R	DDO; 2R	CDO; 2R	ADC; QF	EDM; 3R	IDO; 3R	GDT; DNQ		
2022	IDO; DNQ	GDC; 2R	GDG; DNQ	ADO; QF	EDO; DNQ	CDO; 3R	Did not qualify								
2023	BSD; 1R	Did not qualify			ADO; 1R	DDC; DNQ	BDO; 2R	CDO; DNQ	EDG; 2R	EDM; DNQ	GDO; 2R	DNQ			
2024	Did not qualify				ADO; 1R	Did not qualify									
2025	BDO; DNQ	EDT; 2R	Did not qualify					EDO; 1R	Did not qualify					GDC; 3R	
2026	PDO; DNQ	EDT; 2R	BDO; 2R	DNQ				BSD; SF	Did not qualify			CDO; 1R	Did not qualify		

==== Players Championships ====
Season	1	2	3	4	5	6	7	8	9	10	11	12	13	14	15	16	17	18	19	20	21	22	23	24	25	26	27	28	29	30	31	32	33	34
2013	WIG; 1R	WIG; 3R	WIG; 2R	WIG; 1R	CRA; 1R	CRA; 1R	BAR; 1R	BAR; 1R	DUB; 1R	DUB; 2R	KIL; Prel.	KIL; 1R	WIG; F	WIG; 1R	BAR; 2R	BAR; SF																		
2014	BAR; 1R	BAR; 3R	CRA; 1R	CRA; 1R	WIG; 1R	WIG; 1R	WIG; 2R	WIG; 1R	CRA; 1R	CRA; 1R	COV; 1R	COV; 1R	CRA; 1R	CRA; 1R	DUB; 3R	DUB; 2R	CRA; 1R	CRA; 2R	COV; 1R	COV; 4R														
2015	BAR; 1R	BAR; 2R	BAR; 2R	BAR; 1R	BAR; QF	COV; 3R	COV; 1R	COV; 3R	CRA; 1R	CRA; 2R	BAR; 1R	BAR; 2R	WIG; 1R	WIG; 1R	BAR; 3R	BAR; 1R	DUB; 3R	DUB; 1R	COV; 4R	COV; 2R														
2016	BAR; 3R	BAR; 4R	BAR; 3R	BAR; 3R	BAR; 1R	BAR; 2R	BAR; QF	COV; 3R	COV; 2R	BAR; 2R	BAR; 1R	BAR; 3R	BAR; 1R	BAR; 1R	BAR; 1R	BAR; SF	DUB; 3R	DUB; 1R	BAR; 1R	BAR; 1R														
2017	BAR; 1R	BAR; 1R	BAR; 1R	BAR; 1R	MIL; 3R	MIL; 1R	BAR; 2R	BAR; 3R	WIG; 1R	WIG; 2R	MIL; 2R	MIL; 2R	WIG; 1R	WIG; 1R	BAR; 1R	BAR; 2R	BAR; 1R	BAR; 2R	DUB; 1R	DUB; 2R	BAR; 1R	BAR; 1R												
2018	BAR; 1R	BAR; 4R	BAR; 2R	BAR; 4R	MIL; 1R	MIL; 4R	BAR; 2R	BAR; 4R	WIG; 1R	WIG; 1R	MIL; QF	MIL; QF	WIG; QF	WIG; 1R	BAR; 2R	BAR; 2R	BAR; 3R	BAR; 1R	DUB; 3R	DUB; 4R	BAR; QF	BAR; 4R												
2019	WIG; 3R	WIG; 1R	WIG; 3R	WIG; 1R	BAR; 4R	BAR; F	WIG; 4R	WIG; 1R	BAR; 3R	BAR; 1R	BAR; 4R	BAR; 2R	BAR; 4R	BAR; 3R	BAR; 3R	BAR; 2R	WIG; 2R	WIG; 1R	BAR; 1R	BAR; 1R	HIL; 1R	HIL; 4R	BAR; 1R	BAR; 1R	BAR; 1R	BAR; 1R	DUB; 2R	DUB; 1R	BAR; 1R	BAR; 1R				
2020	BAR; 2R	BAR; 2R	WIG; 1R	WIG; 1R	WIG; 1R	WIG; 4R	BAR; 3R	BAR; 4R	MIL; 4R	MIL; 3R	MIL; 3R	MIL; 3R	MIL; 1R	NIE; 1R	NIE; 4R	NIE; 3R	NIE; 3R	NIE; 1R	COV; 2R	COV; 3R	COV; 1R	COV; 4R	COV; 2R											
2021	BOL; 3R	BOL; 2R	BOL; 3R	BOL; 2R	MIL; 3R	MIL; 3R	MIL; 1R	MIL; 2R	NIE; 1R	NIE; 1R	NIE; 2R	NIE; 3R	MIL; 3R	MIL; 1R	MIL; 2R	MIL; 2R	COV; 1R	COV; 3R	COV; 3R	COV; 1R	BAR; 1R	BAR; 1R	BAR; 1R	BAR; 2R	BAR; 1R	BAR; 3R	BAR; 4R	BAR; 2R	BAR; 3R	BAR; 2R				
2022	BAR; 2R	BAR; 1R	WIG; 1R	WIG; 3R	BAR; 3R	BAR; F	NIE; 3R	NIE; 1R	BAR; 2R	BAR; 1R	BAR; 3R	BAR; 2R	BAR; 1R	WIG; 3R	WIG; 3R	NIE; 3R	NIE; 1R	BAR; 1R	BAR; 1R	BAR; 2R	BAR; 3R	BAR; 1R	BAR; 1R	BAR; 2R	BAR; 2R	BAR; 1R	BAR; 1R	BAR; 1R	BAR; 1R	BAR; 1R				
2023	BAR; 1R	BAR; 1R	BAR; 1R	BAR; 1R	BAR; 2R	BAR; 1R	HIL; 1R	HIL; 2R	WIG; 1R	WIG; 2R	LEI; 1R	LEI; 2R	HIL; 1R	HIL; 3R	LEI; 2R	LEI; 3R	HIL; 2R	HIL; 4R	BAR; 3R	BAR; 2R	BAR; 1R	BAR; 1R	BAR; 1R	BAR; 1R	BAR; 3R	BAR; 2R	BAR; 1R	BAR; QF	BAR; 2R	BAR; 2R				
2024	WIG; 2R	WIG; 3R	LEI; 2R	LEI; 1R	HIL; 1R	HIL; 1R	LEI; 2R	LEI; 4R	HIL; 2R	HIL; 2R	HIL; 1R	HIL; 4R	MIL; 4R	MIL; 1R	MIL; 1R	MIL; F	MIL; 1R	MIL; 1R	MIL; 1R	WIG; 1R	WIG; 1R	MIL; 1R	MIL; 1R	WIG; 2R	WIG; 1R	WIG; 1R	WIG; 1R	WIG; 1R	LEI; 1R	LEI; 1R				
2025	WIG; 2R	WIG; 1R	ROS; 1R	ROS; 2R	LEI; 1R	LEI; 1R	HIL; 4R	HIL; 2R	LEI; 3R	LEI; 1R	LEI; 2R	LEI; 2R	ROS; 2R	ROS; 2R	HIL; 1R	HIL; QF	LEI; 1R	LEI; 2R	LEI; 4R	LEI; 2R	LEI; 3R	HIL; 1R	HIL; 3R	MIL; 1R	MIL; 2R	HIL; 2R	HIL; 1R	LEI; 1R	LEI; 1R	LEI; 1R	WIG; 3R	WIG; 1R	WIG; 4R	WIG; 3R
2026	HIL; 1R	HIL; 2R	WIG; 1R	WIG; 2R	LEI; 2R	LEI; 1R	LEI; 1R	LEI; 1R	WIG; 1R	WIG; 1R	MIL; 2R	MIL; 1R	HIL; 1R	HIL; 2R	LEI; 1R	LEI; DNP	LEI; 1R	LEI; 1R	MIL; 1R	MIL; 1R	WIG; 1R	WIG; 2R	LEI; 1R	LEI; 1R	HIL; 1R	HIL; 4R	LEI; 1R	LEI; 1R	ROS; 1R	ROS; 1R	ROS; 1R	ROS; 1R	LEI; 2R	LEI; 2R

Key

Performance Table Legend
W	Won the tournament	F	Finalist	SF	Semifinalist	QF	Quarterfinalist	#R; RR; Prel.	Lost in # round Round-robin; Preliminary round	DQ	Disqualified
DNQ	Did not qualify	DNP	Did not participate	WD	Withdrew	NH	Tournament not held	#R; RR; Prel.	Lost in # round Round-robin; Preliminary round	NYF	Not yet founded
