= Dave Harrington (darts player) =

New Zealand darts player

Personal information
- Full name: David Harrington
- Nickname: Harry
- Born: 9 October 1953 (age 73) Christchurch, New Zealand
- Home town: Christchurch, New Zealand

Sport
- Sport: Darts
- Playing since: 1993
- Darts: 22 Gram Target Signature
- Laterality: Right-handed
- Walk-on music: "Seven Nation Army" by The White Stripes

Organisation (see split in darts)
- BDO: 2007–2017

PDC premier events – best performances
- World Championship: Last 72: 2013

Other tournament wins
- Tournament: Years
- PDC World New Zealand Qualifying Event: 2012

David Harrington (born 9 October 1953) is a former professional darts player from New Zealand who's currently in British Darts Organisation events. he was nicknamed Harry.

== Career ==
He qualified for the 2013 PDC World Darts Championship by topping the 2012 DPNZ order of merit. He was whitewashed 4–0 in the preliminary round by Haruki Muramatsu of Japan, averaging just 59.36.

== World Championship Results ==
=== PDC ===
- 2013: Last 72: (lost to Haruki Muramatsu 0–4) (legs)
