= Charl Pietersen (darts player) =

South African darts player (born 1991)

Personal information
- Nickname: "Bionic Man"
- Born: 10 March 1991 (age 35) Cape Town, South Africa

Sport
- Sport: Darts
- Playing since: 2009
- Darts: 23g Puma Signature Summit Darts
- Laterality: Right-handed
- Walk-on music: "Seven Nation Army" by The White Stripes

Organisation (see split in darts)
- PDC: 2012–2014
- WDF: 2011–2012

PDC premier events – best performances
- World Championship: Last 72: 2013

Other tournament wins
- Years
PDC World South Africa Qualifying Event	2012

Charles "Charl" Pietersen (born March 10, 1991) is a South African former professional darts player who has competed in the Professional Darts Corporation (PDC) events.

== Career ==
He qualified for the 2013 PDC World Darts Championship after winning the 2013 South African Masters, thrashing Charles Losper 8–1 in the final with a 96.9 average. In the World Championship, he was beaten 1–4 in the preliminary round by Germany's Max Hopp.

Pietersen entered Q School in an attempt to win a PDC Tour Card to play the full circuit in 2013 and 2014. He secured his Tour Card on the first day, beating Kevin McDine 6–5 in his final round match and hitting a nine-dart finish in the process. Pietersen represented South Africa in his first World Cup of Darts in February 2013 alongside Shawn Hogan and finished second in Group B to reach the last 16, where they faced the top seeds England, whose team consisted of the top two players in the world, Phil Taylor and Adrian Lewis. The South African duo took the match to a deciding leg, with Pietersen missing two darts for the match, before England hit double top to win 5–4. Pietersen failed to qualify for the 2013 UK Open as he finished 115th on the Order of Merit, outside the top 96 who claimed their places. He lost in the semi-finals of the South African qualifier for the 2014 World Championship 8–5 to Devon Petersen and a year later Petersen was again the victor at the same stage, this time 8–2. Pietersen's tour status expired at the end of 2014, and he hasn't played in an event since losing to Petersen.

== World Championship results ==
=== PDC ===
- 2013: Preliminary round (lost to Max Hopp 1–4) (legs)
