= Jamie Lewis (darts player) =

Welsh darts player (born 1991)

Personal information
- Nickname: "Fireball"
- Born: 8 November 1991 (age 34) Carmarthen, Wales

Sport
- Sport: Darts
- Playing since: 1999
- Darts: 23g Red Dragon Signature
- Laterality: Right-handed
- Walk-on music: "Fireball" by Pitbull ft. John Ryan

Organisation (see split in darts)
- BDO: 2009–2011
- PDC: 2011–2023
- WDF: 2009–2011, 2021–2023

WDF major events – best performances
- World Championship: Last 48: 2023
- World Masters: Last 24: 2010

PDC premier events – best performances
- World Championship: Semi-final: 2018
- World Matchplay: Last 16: 2015
- World Grand Prix: Quarter-final: 2015
- UK Open: Last 16: 2014
- PC Finals: Last 16: 2015
- World Series Finals: Quarter-final: 2018

Other tournament wins
- Years
Antwerp Open	2022
Welsh Classic	2010
PDC Challenge Tour	2013
Youth events
PDC Development Tour	2012 (x2), 2015
World Youth Masters	2009

Other achievements
- 2015 Breaks into the world's top 32 for the first time
Medal record
Men's Darts
Representing Wales
WDF World Cup
Gold medal – first place	2009 Charlotte	Boys singles
Bronze medal – third place	2011 Castlebar	Men's singles
WDF Europe Cup Youth
Silver medal – second place	2009 Veldhoven	Boys singles

Jamie Lewis (born 8 November 1991) is a Welsh former professional darts player who competed in Professional Darts Corporation (PDC) and World Darts Federation (WDF) events. His biggest achievement to date was reaching the semi-finals of the 2018 PDC World Darts Championship where he lost to Phil Taylor.

== Career ==
Lewis won the World Masters and WDF World Cup boys' events in 2009.

Lewis reached the last 24 of the 2010 World Masters, losing 2–3 in sets to Ted Hankey. He also reached the semi-finals of the 2011 WDF World Cup, losing out to Martin Adams 3–6.

In January 2012, then-20-year-old Lewis successfully earned a Professional Darts Corporation tour card on day four of the PDC Pro Tour Q School. This enabled him to participate in all 2012 and 2013 Players Championships, UK Open Qualifiers and European Tour events. Lewis competed in his first UK Open in 2012, defeating Steve Farmer and Mark Stephenson before falling to Pete Hudson in the second round. In August, Lewis beat John Scott and Michael Barnard in the UK Qualifier for the fourth European Tour event of the year, the German Darts Masters, but then lost 3–6 to Richie Burnett in the first round in Stuttgart, Germany. He also still competed, and won twice, on the 2012 Youth Tour.

Lewis finished fourth on the 2012 Youth Tour Order of Merit, but was the highest player who had not already qualified for the 2013 World Championship. In Lewis' first appearance in the tournament he lost to the Philippines Lourence Ilagan in the preliminary round by four legs to three, despite leading 3–1. He was ranked world number 68 after the event. At the UK Open, Lewis lost 5–3 to Tony West in the preliminary round.

Lewis reached his first final on the main tour at the Gibraltar Darts Trophy. He beat Colin Osborne 6–4, Robert Thornton 6–5, Steve Brown 6–0, Kevin Painter 6–5 and two-time world champion Adrian Lewis 6–5. His match against Lewis guaranteed him a spot in the World Matchplay for the first time and Lewis stated that that match was his final. In the final itself he was defeated 6–1 by 16-time world champion Phil Taylor. He played Painter in the first round of the World Matchplay and was defeated 10–7. His best results in the rest of the year were in two Players Championships where he lost in the quarter-finals to Mensur Suljović and Jamie Robinson. His performances over the year saw him finish 32nd on the ProTour Order of Merit to claim the final spot in the Players Championship Finals. In Lewis' debut in the event he faced top seed Michael van Gerwen in the first round and lost 6–1.

=== 2014 ===
His ProTour ranking saw him qualify for the 2014 World Championship by claiming the third of sixteen spots that were available to players outside the top 32 on the main Order of Merit. Lewis played Raymond van Barneveld in the first round and was beaten 3–0, losing each set by three legs to one as he hit only three of his fourteen darts at a double. Lewis had risen 28 places during the year to be ranked world number 40.

In February 2014, Lewis reached the second Pro Tour final of his career by averaging 108.07 in defeating world number one Michael van Gerwen 6–4 in the semi-finals of the fourth UK Open Qualifier, but he could not replicate the performance in the final as he was beaten 6–1 by Brendan Dolan. He advanced to the fifth round of the UK Open for the first time a month later but was beaten 9–5 by Mensur Suljović. During the rest of the campaign, Lewis was beaten in the last 16 of three Players Championships and qualified for three European Tour events, but could not get past the second round.

=== 2015 ===
Lewis had taken out finishes of 141 and 125 to be level at 1–1 against James Wade in the first round of the 2015 World Championship. He won the first leg of the third set, but then lost six legs in a row to be knocked out 3–1. His first semi-final appearance in over a year came at the 2015 Gibraltar Darts Trophy where he was beaten by Michael van Gerwen 6–1. Lewis made his PDC World Cup of Darts debut as the-then number two Welsh player on the Order of Merit behind Mark Webster and they teamed up at the 2015 event, but suffered a surprise 5–3 loss to Hong Kong in the first round. He defeated Justin Pipe in the first round of the 2015 World Matchplay, 10–7, before losing to Michael van Gerwen 13–2 in the second round. He threw the first nine-dart finish of his PDC career at Players Championship 17.

At the World Grand Prix, Lewis survived two match darts from William O'Connor to edge past him 2–1 in the first round and then came from 2–0 down in sets against Michael Smith to win 3–2. In his first major event quarter-final he was whitewashed by Van Gerwen 3–0. Robert Thornton missed one match dart in the first round of the Players Championship Finals to allow Lewis to win 6–5. He led Dave Chisnall 8–6 in the second round, but lost four legs on the spin, missing three darts to force a deciding leg.

=== 2016 ===
Lewis lost 3–1 to Daryl Gurney in the first round of the 2016 World Championship. In the second UK Open Qualifier, Lewis reached the semi-finals and was narrowly beaten 6–5 by Alan Norris. This gave him entry in to the third round of the main event and Stephen Bunting hit legs of 12 and 11 darts to move from 8–7 down to win 9–8. In the penultimate Players Championship event, Lewis eliminated the likes of Benito van de Pas and Robert Thornton to play in the quarter-finals, where he lost 6–5 to Simon Whitlock. He recorded a 6–4 win over Jamie Caven in the opening round of the Players Championship Finals, before being knocked out 6–4 by Dave Chisnall.

=== 2017 ===
Lewis won a match at the World Championship at the fifth time of asking when he edged past Mick McGowan 3–2. He was knocked out by Peter Wright in the second round with a score of 4–0.

=== 2018 ===
Lewis failed to qualify for the 2018 PDC World Darts Championship via the Order of Merit, saying on Twitter that he was really disappointed in himself for his failure to qualify. However, he finished third at the PDPA Qualifier in Milton Keynes, winning a place in the preliminary round. After defeating Kenny Neyens in the preliminary round, and compatriot Jonny Clayton in the first round, he defeated world number two Peter Wright in the second round, before knocking out James Richardson to reach the quarter final.

In the quarter-final, Lewis whitewashed Darren Webster. In defeating Richardson and Webster, he became the first player to qualify for a quarter-final, and subsequently a semi-final, after starting in the preliminary round. In the semi-finals, Jamie went out to Phil Taylor 6–1.

On 10 March, Lewis reached the semi-finals at Players Championship 3. He defeated Diogo Portela 6–3 in the opening round, then Adam Hunt 6–5, hitting a nine-dart finish in the penultimate leg to break Hunt's throw and take the game to a last-leg decider in which he held throw in 16 darts. Lewis then defeated Stephen Bunting 6–2, Danny Noppert 6–1, and Joe Cullen 6–3, before losing to Gary Anderson 6–3 in the semi-finals.

=== 2019 ===
Lewis qualified for the 2019 PDC World Darts Championship through being in the Top 32 on the Order of Merit. He entered the tournament in the second round as he was seeded 28th. There he faced Cody Harris, against whom he was leading 2–0, but the match went into the deciding set after a comeback from Harris. In the deciding set, Lewis whitewashed Harris and advanced into the third round. He faced the fifth seed, Daryl Gurney, and again Lewis led 3–1 in sets, but yet again the match went to a deciding set. Lewis won the match 4–3, winning the final set and reached the last 16 of the PDC World Darts Championship for the second year in a row. In the fourth round he was whitewashed by Dave Chisnall 4–0 in sets.

At the 2019 UK Open Lewis was seeded into the fourth round, where he defeated Adrian Lewis 10–9 in a deciding leg. In the fifth round Lewis lost to Josh Payne 10–7.

Lewis did not qualify for any other major tournaments or European Tour events during the rest of the 2019 season. In Players Championship tournaments he was able to win just £7,000 during the whole year and ended up ranked 105th on the Players Championship Order of Merit.

=== 2020 ===
Close to the cut-off for 2020 PDC World Darts Championship he slipped out of top 32 and subsequently did not qualify for the event. He was not able to defend the prize money from the semifinal two years ago and slipped down to 57th place in PDC Order of Merit. It was still enough to maintain his Tour card.

Lewis was seeded into the third round of 2020 UK Open and defeated Ross Smith 6–5 in a deciding leg. In the fourth round he lost to Mensur Suljović 10–4.

Although the season was influenced by the outbreak of COVID-19, Lewis again struggled and did not qualify for any other major tournament. He qualified for the 2020 International Darts Open, but lost to Robert Marijanovic 6–0 in the first round, scoring a three dart average of only 57.72.

In September, Lewis announced that he was stepping away from the darts to focus on his private life. It was not disclosed at the time whether or not he intended to surrender his PDC Tour Card.

In October, after losing in the European Tour event, Lewis revealed that he was suffering with anxiety disorder.

Despite this statement, he entered the PDC World Championship PDPA UK Qualifier. Lewis was the fifth seed for the qualifier and defeated David Pallett and Alan Tabern 6–2 to reach his quarter's final. Lewis defeated Robert Thornton 7–5, to qualify for the 2021 World Championship.

=== 2021 ===
At the PDC World Championship Lewis played ProTour qualifier Luke Woodhouse in the first round and came back from 2–0 down to win 3–2 in sets. In the second round he won the opening set and the fourth set against the eventual champion Gerwyn Price, but lost 3–2.

== World Championship results ==
=== PDC World Championship ===
- 2013: Preliminary round (lost to Lourence Ilagan 3–4) (legs)
- 2014: First round (lost to Raymond van Barneveld 0–3) (sets)
- 2015: First round (lost to James Wade 1–3)
- 2016: First round (lost to Daryl Gurney 1–3)
- 2017: Second round (lost to Peter Wright 0–4)
- 2018: Semi-final (lost to Phil Taylor 1–6)
- 2019: Fourth round (lost to Dave Chisnall 0–4)
- 2021: Second round (lost to Gerwyn Price 2–3)

=== WDF World Championship ===
- 2023: First round (lost to Jarno Bottenberg 0–2 (Sets)

== Performance timeline ==
=== BDO ===
Tournament	2010	2011
BDO Ranked televised events
World Masters	5R	2R

=== WDF ===
Tournament	2023
WDF Ranked televised events
World Championship	1R

=== PDC ===
Tournament	2012	2013	2014	2015	2016	2017	2018	2019	2020	2021
PDC Ranked televised events
World Championship	DNQ	Prel.	1R	1R	1R	2R	SF	4R	DNQ	2R
UK Open	2R	Prel.	5R	DNQ	3R	2R	3R	5R	4R	DNQ
World Matchplay	DNQ	1R	DNQ	2R	DNQ					
World Grand Prix	DNQ			QF	DNQ					
Players Championship Finals	DNQ	1R	DNQ	2R	2R	DNQ	1R	DNQ		
PDC Non-ranked televised events
World Cup	DNQ			1R	DNQ					
World Series Finals	Not held			2R	DNQ		QF	DNQ		
World Youth Championship	QF	1R	DNQ	2R	DNP					
Career statistics
Year-end ranking (PDC)	61	41	37	30	31	30	26	57	78	–

==== Players Championships ====
Season	1	2	3	4	5	6	7	8	9	10	11	12	13	14	15	16	17	18	19	20	21	22	23	24	25	26	27	28	29	30
2018	BAR; 1R	BAR; 2R	BAR; SF	BAR; 2R	MIL; 1R	MIL; 2R	BAR; 3R	BAR; 4R	WIG; 1R	WIG; 3R	MIL; 1R	MIL; 1R	WIG; 1R	WIG; 4R	BAR; 1R	BAR; 3R	BAR; 2R	BAR; 1R	DUB; 1R	DUB; 1R	BAR; 1R	BAR; 1R								
2019	WIG; 1R	WIG; 2R	WIG; 3R	WIG; 1R	BAR; 2R	BAR; 2R	WIG; 3R	WIG; 1R	BAR; 1R	BAR; 1R	BAR; 1R	BAR; 1R	BAR; 1R	BAR; 1R	BAR; 3R	BAR; 2R	WIG; 1R	WIG; 1R	BAR; 1R	BAR; 1R	HIL; 1R	HIL; 1R	BAR; 2R	BAR; 1R	BAR; 1R	BAR; 2R	DUB; 1R	DUB; 1R	BAR; 1R	BAR; 3R
2020	BAR; 1R	BAR; 1R	WIG; 1R	WIG; 1R	WIG; 4R	WIG; 1R	BAR; 1R	BAR; 2R	MIL; 1R	MIL; 2R	MIL; 1R	MIL; 1R	MIL; DNP	NIE; 1R	NIE; 1R	NIE; 1R	Did not participate													

Key

Performance Table Legend
W	Won the tournament	F	Finalist	SF	Semifinalist	QF	Quarterfinalist	#R; RR; Prel.	Lost in # round Round-robin; Preliminary round	DQ	Disqualified
DNQ	Did not qualify	DNP	Did not participate	WD	Withdrew	NH	Tournament not held	#R; RR; Prel.	Lost in # round Round-robin; Preliminary round	NYF	Not yet founded

== Career finals ==
=== PDC European tour finals: 1 ===
Legend
Other (0–1)

Outcome	No.	Year	Championship	Opponent in the final	Score
Runner-up	1.	2013	Gibraltar Darts Trophy	Phil Taylor	1–6 (l)
