= Mohd Latif Sapup =

Malaysian darts player

Personal information
- Full name: Mohammed-Latif Sapup
- Nickname: The Joker
- Born: 25 September 1963 (age 63) Selangor, Malaysia

Sport
- Sport: Darts
- Playing since: 1995
- Darts: 24 Gram Target Signature
- Laterality: Right-handed
- Walk-on music: "No Limit" by 2 Unlimited

Organisation (see split in darts)
- PDC: 2012–2014

PDC premier events – best performances
- World Championship: Last 72: 2013, 2014

Other tournament wins
- Years
PDC World South Asian Qualifying Event	2012, 2013

Mohd Latif Sapup (born 25 September 1963) is a former Malaysian professional darts player.

== Career ==
In 2009 Sapup lost in the final of the Malaysian Open to Joseph Clairines. He qualified for the 2013 PDC World Darts Championship after coming through the South Asian qualifier, but was beaten 4–1 in the preliminary round by Singapore's Paul Lim.

He qualified for the World Championship again for the 2014 edition after defeating compatriot Kesava Rao to win the South Asian qualifier. He missed numerous chances to win the first two legs, but did take out a 141 finish to stay in the match, however this was the only double he hit out of ten attempts as he lost to Devon Petersen 4–1.

== World Championship results ==
=== PDC ===
- 2013: Last 72 (lost to Paul Lim 1–4) (legs)
- 2014: Last 72 (lost to Devon Petersen 1–4)
