= 2013 PDC World Darts Championship =

Tournament information
- Dates: 14 December 2012 – 1 January 2013
- Venue: Alexandra Palace
- Location: London
- Country: England
- Organisation(s): PDC
- Format: Legs (preliminaries); Sets (from Round 1); Final – best of 13
- Prize fund: £1,000,000
- Winner's share: £200,000
- Nine-dart finish: Dean Winstanley; Michael van Gerwen
- High checkout: 170; Paul Lim; Phil Taylor

Champion(s)
- Phil Taylor

The 2013 PDC World Darts Championship (known for sponsorship reasons as the 2013 Ladbrokes World Darts Championship) was the twentieth World Championship organised by the Professional Darts Corporation since it separated from the British Darts Organisation. The event took place at the Alexandra Palace, London between 14 December 2012 and 1 January 2013.

Adrian Lewis was the defending champion having won the last two editions of the tournament, but was beaten by Michael van Gerwen in the quarter-finals, thus ending Lewis' 15 match unbeaten run at the World Championship.

Two nine-dart finishes were obtained at this year's World Championship; Dean Winstanley achieved the feat in his third round loss to Vincent van der Voort, and Michael van Gerwen threw one in his semi-final victory over James Wade.

Phil Taylor aged 52 claimed his 16th and last World Championship title with a 7–4 victory over Michael van Gerwen in the final, despite trailing 0–2 and then 2–4 after six sets. Van Gerwen averaged between 105 and 108 in the early sets but as his average dropped, Taylor's average reached 103, winning five successive sets to claim his 16th title over a rival he admitted in the post-match interview was 'hard to crack'.

With his 2013 PDC World Championship win, Taylor became the first winner of the newly created Sid Waddell Trophy, named after the legendary darts commentator who died of bowel cancer on 11 August 2012.

== Format and qualifiers ==
The televised stages featured 72 players. The top 32 players in the PDC Order of Merit on 26 November 2012 were seeded for the tournament. They were joined by the 16 highest non-qualified players from the Pro Tour Order of Merit, based on the 33 events played on the PDC Pro Tour.

These 48 players were joined by two PDPA qualifiers (as determined at a PDPA Qualifying event held in Barnsley on 26 November 2012), the highest ranked non-qualified player on the PDC Youth Tour Order of Merit, and 21 international players: the four highest names in the European Order of Merit not already qualified, and 17 further international qualifiers to be determined by the PDC and PDPA.

Some of the international players, such as the four from the European Order of Merit, and the top American and Australian players were entered straight into the first round, while others, having won qualifying events in their countries, were entered into the preliminary round.

Players were:

Order of Merit

1. (England) Phil Taylor
2. (England) Adrian Lewis
3. (England) James Wade
4. (Scotland) Gary Anderson
5. (Australia) Simon Whitlock
6. (England) Wes Newton
7. (Netherlands) Michael van Gerwen
8. (England) Andy Hamilton
9. (England) Terry Jenkins
10. (Wales) Mark Webster
11. (England) Justin Pipe
12. (England) Dave Chisnall
13. (Netherlands) Raymond van Barneveld
14. (England) Mervyn King
15. (England) Kevin Painter
16. (Australia) Paul Nicholson
17. (Scotland) Robert Thornton
18. (England) Ronnie Baxter
19. (Netherlands) Vincent van der Voort
20. (Northern Ireland) Brendan Dolan
21. (England) Andy Smith
22. (England) Mark Walsh
23. (England) Colin Lloyd
24. (Canada) John Part
25. (Wales) Richie Burnett
26. (Scotland) Peter Wright
27. (Belgium) Kim Huybrechts
28. (England) Colin Osborne
29. (England) Jamie Caven
30. (England) Steve Beaton
31. (England) Denis Ovens
32. (England) Wayne Jones

Pro Tour

1. (England) Ian White
2. (England) Michael Smith
3. (England) Dean Winstanley
4. (England) James Hubbard
5. (England) Arron Monk
6. (England) Joe Cullen
7. (England) Scott Rand
8. (England) Darren Webster
9. (England) Dennis Priestley
10. (England) Johnny Haines
11. (England) Steve Brown
12. (England) James Richardson
13. (England) Peter Hudson
14. (Northern Ireland) Mickey Mansell
15. (England) Mark Jones
16. (England) Andy Jenkins

European Order of Merit
First round qualifiers

- (Netherlands) Co Stompé
- (Netherlands) Gino Vos
- (Sweden) Magnus Caris
- (Netherlands) Jerry Hendriks

PDPA Qualifiers
First round qualifier

- (England) Stuart Kellett

Preliminary round qualifier

- (England) John Bowles

PDC Youth Tour Qualifier
Preliminary round qualifier

- (Wales) Jamie Lewis

International Qualifiers
First round qualifiers

- (United States) Darin Young
- (Australia) Shane Tichowitsch
- (Australia) Kyle Anderson

Preliminary round qualifiers

- (Northern Ireland) Daryl Gurney
- (Finland) Jani Haavisto
- (New Zealand) Dave Harrington
- (Germany) Max Hopp
- (Philippines) Lourence Ilagan
- (Finland) Jarkko Komula
- (Malaysia) Mohd Latif Sapup
- (Hong Kong) Leung Chen Nam
- (Singapore) Paul Lim
- (Croatia) Robert Marijanović
- (Japan) Haruki Muramatsu
- (South Africa) Charl Pietersen
- (Spain) Carlos Rodríguez
- (Germany) Andree Welge

== Prize money ==
The 2013 World Championship featured a prize fund of £1,000,000 – the same as in the previous three years.

The prize money was allocated as follows:

Position (num. of players)		Prize money (Total: £1,000,000)
Winner	(1)	£200,000
Runner-Up	(1)	£100,000
Semi-finalists	(2)	£50,000
Quarter-finalists	(4)	£25,000
Third round losers	(8)	£15,000
Second round losers	(16)	£10,000
First round losers	(32)	£6,000
Preliminary round losers	(8)	£3,500
Nine-dart finish	(2)	£15,000 (£7,500 each)

== Draw ==
The draw for the Round of 64 took place on 4 December 2012, the preliminary round pairings were published on 26 November 2012.

=== Preliminary round ===
The winner played his first-round match the same day.

Av.	Player	Score	Player	Av.
76.70	(Germany) Andree Welge	1–4	(Hong Kong) Leung Chen Nam	80.10
90.51	(Northern Ireland) Daryl Gurney	4–3	(Croatia) Robert Marijanović	82.16
87.00	(Germany) Max Hopp	4–1	(South Africa) Charl Pietersen	81.79
82.32	(Finland) Jarkko Komula	2–4	(Finland) Jani Haavisto	88.18
81.92	(Spain) Carlos Rodríguez	2–4	(England) John Bowles	79.01
78.30	(Philippines) Lourence Ilagan	4–3	(Wales) Jamie Lewis	81.84
87.13	(Japan) Haruki Muramatsu	4–0	(New Zealand) Dave Harrington	59.36
79.69	(Singapore) Paul Lim	4–1	(Malaysia) Mohd Latif Sapup	65.58

=== Last 64 ===
==== Finals ====
Quarter-finals (best of 9 sets); 28–29 December
1	(England) Phil Taylor 101.38	5
8	(England) Andy Hamilton 96.38	0
5	(Australia) Simon Whitlock 97.36	1
13	(Netherlands) Raymond van Barneveld 102.32	5
2	(England) Adrian Lewis 100.80	4
7	(Netherlands) Michael van Gerwen 102.73	5
6	(England) Wes Newton 97.15	4
3	(England) James Wade 92.89	5

Semi-finals (best of 11 sets); 30 December
1	(England) Phil Taylor 98.98	6
13	(Netherlands) Raymond van Barneveld 96.74	4
7	(Netherlands) Michael van Gerwen 97.87	6
3	(England) James Wade 87.37	4

Final (best of 13 sets); 1 January
1	(England) Phil Taylor 103.04	7
7	(Netherlands) Michael van Gerwen 100.66	4

==== Rounds 1-4 ====
First round (best of 5 sets); 14–20 December
1	(England) Phil Taylor 93.92	3
(Northern Ireland) Mickey Mansell 78.46	0
32	(England) Wayne Jones 92.21	0
(Netherlands) Jerry Hendriks 87.50	3
16	(Australia) Paul Nicholson 87.95	3
(Netherlands) Co Stompé 85.63	0
17	(Scotland) Robert Thornton 99.06	3
(Sweden) Magnus Caris 83.27	0
8	(England) Andy Hamilton 90.24	3
(England) James Richardson 83.26	1
25	(Wales) Richie Burnett 82.73	3
(England) James Hubbard 78.80	2
9	(England) Terry Jenkins 94.31	3
(England) Steve Brown 86.12	0
24	(Canada) John Part 89.56	3
(England) Joe Cullen 87.89	0
5	(Australia) Simon Whitlock 95.50	3
(Japan) Haruki Muramatsu 84.75	0
28	(England) Colin Osborne 94.51	3
(Philippines) Lourence Ilagan 87.59	0
12	(England) Dave Chisnall 92.89	3
(Australia) Shane Tichowitsch 92.07	0
21	(England) Andy Smith 81.81	1
(Northern Ireland) Daryl Gurney 83.35	3
4	(Scotland) Gary Anderson 98.82	3
(Finland) Jani Haavisto 90.39	1
29	(England) Jamie Caven 94.15	2
(England) John Bowles 93.56	3
13	(Netherlands) Raymond van Barneveld 108.31	3
(England) Michael Smith 87.90	0
20	(Northern Ireland) Brendan Dolan 92.98	3
(England) Mark Jones 87.95	0
2	(England) Adrian Lewis 83.14	3
(Netherlands) Gino Vos 79.90	1
31	(England) Denis Ovens 81.71	3
(Germany) Max Hopp 78.40	2
15	(England) Kevin Painter 94.97	3
(Hong Kong) Leung Chen Nam 82.81	0
18	(England) Ronnie Baxter 88.72	3
(England) Dennis Priestley 88.20	1
7	(Netherlands) Michael van Gerwen 90.64	3
(Singapore) Paul Lim 87.60	0
26	(Scotland) Peter Wright 94.95	3
(England) Arron Monk 89.88	0
10	(Wales) Mark Webster 97.00	3
(England) Ian White 92.11	1
23	(England) Colin Lloyd 94.22	3
(United States) Darin Young 86.57	2
6	(England) Wes Newton 86.90	3
(England) Johnny Haines 84.29	0
27	(Belgium) Kim Huybrechts 98.79	2
(England) Scott Rand 97.82	3
11	(England) Justin Pipe 84.23	3
(England) Andy Jenkins 73.20	0
22	(England) Mark Walsh 88.58	3
(England) Darren Webster 87.60	1
3	(England) James Wade 91.09	3
(England) Peter Hudson 82.57	0
30	(England) Steve Beaton 87.54	3
(Australia) Kyle Anderson 83.63	0
14	(England) Mervyn King 90.70	2
(England) Dean Winstanley 91.76	3
19	(Netherlands) Vincent van der Voort 89.01	3
(England) Stuart Kellett 87.53	0

Second round (best of 7 sets); 21–23 December
1	(England) Taylor 90.23	4
(Netherlands) Hendriks 82.75	1
16	(Australia) Nicholson 92.56	3
17	(Scotland) Thornton 94.79	4
8	(England) Hamilton 97.27	4
25	(Wales) Burnett 89.60	1
9	(England) Jenkins 98.18	4
24	(Canada) Part 89.34	1
5	(Australia) Whitlock 96.34	4
28	(England) Osborne 89.79	0
12	(England) Chisnall 98.44	4
(Northern Ireland) Gurney 96.42	1
4	(Scotland) Anderson 98.01	4
(England) Bowles 90.32	3
13	(Netherlands) van Barneveld 95.75	4
20	(Northern Ireland) Dolan 86.52	1
2	(England) A. Lewis 87.95	4
31	(England) Ovens 84.72	1
15	(England) Painter 95.86	4
18	(England) Baxter 92.76	3
7	(Netherlands) van Gerwen 102.13	4
26	(Scotland) Wright 95.24	2
10	(Wales) Webster 89.97	2
23	(England) Lloyd 92.81	4
6	(England) Newton 99.53	4
(England) Rand 90.20	0
11	(England) Pipe 92.50	2
22	(England) Walsh 91.41	4
3	(England) Wade 92.13	4
30	(England) Beaton 88.76	2
(England) Winstanley 91.48	2
19	(Netherlands) van der Voort 90.79	4

Third round (best of 7 sets); 23–27 December
1	(England) Taylor 97.18	4
17	(Scotland) Thornton 94.80	0
8	(England) Hamilton 99.47	4
9	(England) Jenkins 100.39	1
5	(Australia) Whitlock 91.07	4
12	(England) Chisnall 88.90	3
4	(Scotland) Anderson 88.62	0
13	(Netherlands) van Barneveld 93.35	4
2	(England) A. Lewis 95.06	4
15	(England) Painter 92.36	2
7	(Netherlands) van Gerwen 98.96	4
23	(England) Lloyd 91.33	1
6	(England) Newton 87.22	4
22	(England) Walsh 80.75	1
3	(England) Wade 89.61	4
19	(Netherlands) van der Voort 95.70	0

Quarter-finals (best of 9 sets); 28–29 December
1	(England) Taylor 101.38	5
8	(England) Hamilton 96.38	0
5	(Australia) Whitlock 97.36	1
13	(Netherlands) van Barneveld 102.32	5
2	(England) A. Lewis 100.80	4
7	(Netherlands) van Gerwen 102.73	5
6	(England) Newton 97.15	4
3	(England) Wade 92.89	5

== Final ==
Final: Best of 13 sets. Referees: George Noble (first half) and Bruce Spendley (second half). Alexandra Palace, London, England, 1 January 2013.
(1) Phil Taylor (England)	7 – 4	(Netherlands) Michael van Gerwen (7)
2 – 3, 1 – 3, 3 – 2, 3 – 2, 2 – 3, 1 – 3, 3 – 2, 3 – 1, 3 – 2, 3 – 1, 3 – 1
103.04	Average (3 darts)	100.66
5	180 scores	9
170	Highest checkout	140
42%	Checkout summary	53%

== Statistics ==
Player	Eliminated	Played	Sets Won	Sets Lost	Legs Won	Legs Lost	100+	140+	180s	High checkout	Average
(England) Phil Taylor	Winner	6	29	9	98	49	198	99	20	170	97.46
(Netherlands) Michael van Gerwen	Runner-up	6	26	18	103	79	223	135	57	144	98.83
(Netherlands) Raymond van Barneveld	Semi-final	5	20	8	67	43	138	91	34	136	99.29
(England) James Wade	Semi-final	5	20	12	69	58	167	83	17	130	90.62
(England) Andy Hamilton	Quarter-final	4	11	8	39	40	100	43	20	138	95.84
(Australia) Simon Whitlock	Quarter-final	4	12	8	46	38	97	56	22	164	95.07
(England) Wes Newton	Quarter-final	4	15	6	52	36	106	71	19	144	92.70
(England) Adrian Lewis	Quarter-final	4	15	9	55	44	116	68	29	138	91.74
(England) Terry Jenkins	Third round	3	8	5	30	22	64	37	23	120	97.63
(Scotland) Robert Thornton	Third round	3	7	7	31	32	81	47	19	150	96.22
(Scotland) Gary Anderson	Third round	3	7	8	35	37	80	47	27	142	95.15
(England) Kevin Painter	Third round	3	9	7	34	30	72	42	22	160	94.40
(England) Dave Chisnall	Third round	3	10	5	37	33	88	44	24	157	93.41
(England) Colin Lloyd	Third round	3	8	8	35	36	90	51	10	132	92.79
(Netherlands) Vincent van der Voort	Third round	3	7	6	28	26	60	35	14	108	91.83
(England) Mark Walsh	Third round	3	8	7	32	29	76	39	11	101	86.91
(Scotland) Peter Wright	Second round	2	5	4	17	18	51	26	9	141	95.10
(England) Scott Rand	Second round	2	3	6	14	20	46	21	4	104	94.01
(Wales) Mark Webster	Second round	2	5	5	22	18	48	21	12	145	93.49
(England) Colin Osborne	Second round	2	3	4	13	17	28	22	5	164	92.15
(England) Dean Winstanley	Second round	2	5	6	24	27	64	28	19	141	91.62
(England) Ronnie Baxter	Second round	2	6	5	23	23	50	22	17	89	90.74
(Australia) Paul Nicholson	Second round	2	6	4	28	21	63	38	7	107	90.26
(Northern Ireland) Daryl Gurney	Second round	3	4	5	26	22	51	28	15	122	90.09
(Northern Ireland) Brendan Dolan	Second round	2	4	4	16	13	34	19	7	124	89.75
(Canada) John Part	Second round	2	4	4	15	16	39	13	5	127	89.45
(England) Justin Pipe	Second round	2	5	4	19	16	60	21	4	116	88.37
(England) Steve Beaton	Second round	2	5	4	19	17	37	31	6	84	88.15
(England) John Bowles	Second round	3	6	6	35	33	102	50	12	121	87.63
(Wales) Richie Burnett	Second round	2	4	6	22	22	54	32	9	121	86.17
(Netherlands) Jerry Hendriks	Second round	2	4	4	12	19	31	21	6	156	85.13
(England) Denis Ovens	Second round	2	4	6	20	20	56	24	3	113	83.22
(Belgium) Kim Huybrechts	First round	1	2	3	8	9	29	7	3	127	98.79
(England) Jamie Caven	First round	1	2	3	12	13	28	19	6	110	94.15
(England) Wayne Jones	First round	1	0	3	6	9	32	7	3	116	92.21
(England) Ian White	First round	1	1	3	4	11	15	8	7	98	92.11
(Australia) Shane Tichowitsch	First round	1	0	3	5	9	17	10	2	161	92.07
(England) Mervyn King	First round	1	2	3	13	14	35	20	4	140	90.70
(England) Arron Monk	First round	1	0	3	3	9	12	9	1	52	89.88
(Finland) Jani Haavisto	First round	2	1	3	11	13	30	13	4	130	89.29
(England) Dennis Priestley	First round	1	1	3	8	11	23	12	4	92	88.20
(England) Mark Jones	First round	1	0	3	1	9	18	6	1	16	87.95
(England) Michael Smith	First round	1	0	3	1	9	5	5	3	40	87.90
(England) Joe Cullen	First round	1	0	3	4	9	13	9	3	52	87.89
(England) Darren Webster	First round	1	1	3	5	10	18	8	5	76	87.60
(England) Stuart Kellett	First round	1	0	3	4	9	15	7	2	84	87.53
(United States) Darin Young	First round	1	2	3	12	15	28	14	4	144	86.57
(England) Steve Brown	First round	1	0	3	3	9	16	5	1	76	86.12
(Japan) Haruki Muramatsu	First round	2	0	3	7	9	26	11	0	116	85.94
(Netherlands) Co Stompé	First round	1	0	3	2	9	17	3	2	72	85.63
(England) Johnny Haines	First round	1	0	3	3	9	15	12	0	95	84.29
(Singapore) Paul Lim	First round	2	0	3	9	10	19	13	0	170	83.65
(Australia) Kyle Anderson	First round	1	0	3	4	9	19	7	1	40	83.63
(Sweden) Magnus Caris	First round	1	0	3	1	9	11	2	1	64	83.27
(England) James Richardson	First round	1	1	3	7	10	28	10	1	100	83.26
(Philippines) Lourence Ilagan	First round	2	0	3	9	12	27	12	1	121	82.95
(Germany) Max Hopp	First round	2	2	3	12	13	27	16	2	96	82.70
(England) Peter Hudson	First round	1	0	3	2	9	14	4	2	56	82.57
(England) Andy Smith	First round	1	1	3	5	11	23	14	0	64	81.81
(Hong Kong) Leung Chen Nam	First round	2	0	3	6	10	23	7	4	40	81.46
(Netherlands) Gino Vos	First round	1	1	3	7	9	16	5	3	61	79.90
(England) James Hubbard	First round	1	2	3	8	13	27	13	1	101	78.80
(Northern Ireland) Mickey Mansell	First round	1	0	3	1	9	14	4	1	82	78.46
(England) Andy Jenkins	First round	1	0	3	2	9	12	4	0	70	73.20
(Finland) Jarkko Komula	Preliminary round	1	0	0	2	4	5	6	0	81	82.32
(Croatia) Robert Marijanović	Preliminary round	1	0	0	3	4	14	3	0	73	82.16
(Spain) Carlos Rodríguez	Preliminary round	1	0	0	2	4	6	2	1	40	81.92
(Wales) Jamie Lewis	Preliminary round	1	0	0	3	4	7	4	1	118	81.84
(South Africa) Charl Pietersen	Preliminary round	1	0	0	1	4	6	5	0	40	81.79
(Germany) Andree Welge	Preliminary round	1	0	0	1	4	5	5	0	16	76.70
(Malaysia) Mohd Latif Sapup	Preliminary round	1	0	0	1	4	7	0	0	10	65.58
(New Zealand) Dave Harrington	Preliminary round	1	0	0	0	4	1	1	0	–	59.36

Source: Match reports in the draw

== Representation from different countries ==
This table shows the number of players by country in the World Championship, the total number including the preliminary round.

	(England) ENG	(Netherlands) NED	(Australia) AUS	(Scotland) SCO	(Northern Ireland) NIR	(Wales) WAL	(Finland) FIN	(Germany) GER	(Belgium) BEL	(Canada) CAN	(United States) USA	(Sweden) SWE	(Malaysia) MAS	(Singapore) SIN	(Japan) JPN	(New Zealand) NZL	(Croatia) CRO	(Philippines) PHI	(Hong Kong) HKG	(South Africa) RSA	(Spain) SPA	Total
Final	1	1	0	0	0	0	0	0	0	0	0	0	0	0	0	0	0	0	0	0	0	2
Semis	2	2	0	0	0	0	0	0	0	0	0	0	0	0	0	0	0	0	0	0	0	4
Quarters	5	2	1	0	0	0	0	0	0	0	0	0	0	0	0	0	0	0	0	0	0	8
Round 3	10	3	1	2	0	0	0	0	0	0	0	0	0	0	0	0	0	0	0	0	0	16
Round 2	18	4	2	3	2	2	0	0	0	1	0	0	0	0	0	0	0	0	0	0	0	32
Round 1	36	6	4	3	3	2	1	1	1	1	1	1	0	1	1	0	0	1	1	0	0	64
Prelim.	1	0	0	0	1	1	2	2	0	0	0	0	1	1	1	1	1	1	1	1	1	16
Total	36	6	4	3	3	3	2	2	1	1	1	1	1	1	1	1	1	1	1	1	1	72

== Broadcasting ==
The tournament was available in the following countries on these channels.

Country	Channel
(Republic of Ireland) United Kingdom and Ireland	Sky Sports HD
Netherlands	RTL 7
Germany	Sport1
Middle East	OSN Sports
Czech Republic; Hungary; Romania; Slovakia	Sport TV (Sport 1 and Sport 2)
Australia	Fox Sports
New Zealand	Sky New Zealand

Additionally, the semi-finals and final were broadcast in 3D in the United Kingdom and Ireland.
