= Beau Anderson =

Indigenous Australian darts player (born 1982)

Personal information
- Nickname: The Boomerang
- Born: 25 December 1982 (age 43) Perth, Australia
- Home town: Maddington, Australia

Sport
- Sport: Darts
- Playing since: 1991
- Darts: 21 Gram Tigers
- Laterality: Right-handed
- Walk-on music: "New Sensation" by INXS

Organisation (see split in darts)
- BDO: 2006–2013
- PDC: 2013–2017

PDC premier events – best performances
- World Championship: Last 32: 2014

Other tournament wins
- Years
Dosh Balcatta AGP	2015
Oceanic Masters	2013
Pacific Masters	2010
Sydney Masters	2013
Medal record
Men's Darts
Representing Australia
WDF Asia-Pacific Cup
Gold medal – first place	2010 Tokyo	Team event
Bronze medal – third place	2010 Tokyo	Men's pairs

Beau Anderson (born 25 December 1982) is an Australian former professional darts player who played within the Professional Darts Corporation (PDC) from 2013 to 2017.

== Personal life ==
Beau's brother was the late Kyle Anderson who was also a Darts player.

Beau and Kyle had a close relationship and regularly cheered each other on in tournaments from the crowd. Beau was present for what was arguably the pinnacle of his brother's career when he hit a 9 Darter in a World Championship match against Ian White in December 2013 at Alexandra Palace.

== Career ==
In 2010, Anderson beat Bill Stanley 6–4 to win the Pacific Masters.

In 2013, he won the qualifier for the Sydney Darts Masters, a tournament which saw the top eight on the PDC Order of Merit compete against the best players from Australasia. He faced world number six Andy Hamilton in the first round and lost 4–6. Anderson saw off Tic Bridge 6–4 to claim the 2013 Oceanic Masters which earned him a place in the opening round of the 2014 PDC World Championship, where he beat former world number one Colin Lloyd 3–2 in the first round after winning the deciding set 6–5 in a sudden-death leg. However, he could only win two legs in the second round against Robert Thornton in a 0–4 defeat. In the defence of his Oceanic Masters title he was beaten 5–6 by Rob Szabo in the quarter-finals.

Anderson won the second Dosh Balcatta AGP of 2015 by beating Shane Tichowitsch 6–2 in the final. He only played in the Pacific Masters in 2016, where he lost in the first round.

== World Championship results ==
=== PDC ===
- 2014: Second round (lost to Robert Thornton 0–4)
