= 2012 PDPA Players Championship 10 =

Second Round
1	Justin Pipe	6
(England) Steve Hine	5
32	(England) James Richardson	6
(England) Chris Thompson	0
16	(England) Colin Osborne	6
(England) Brian Woods	4
17	(Scotland) Peter Wright	6
(England) Ian Moss	2
8	(Wales) Mark Webster	5
(England) Ted Hankey	6
25	(England) Mark Walsh	6
(England) Darren Johnson	2
(England) Matthew Edgar	4
(Scotland) Les Wallace	6
24	(England) Ian White	6
(England) Damien Sherwood	3
5	(England) James Wade	6
(England) Alex Roy	4
(England) Dean Winstanley	6
(England) Richie Howson	0
12	(England) Colin Lloyd	6
(England) Gaz Cousins	3
21	(Netherlands) Vincent van der Voort	3
(England) Aaron Turner	6
4	(England) Ronnie Baxter	2
(Scotland) Jim Walker	6
29	(England) Adrian Lewis	4
(Netherlands) Roland Scholten	6
13	(England) Terry Jenkins	6
(Republic of Ireland) Liam Kelly	4
(Spain) Antonio Alcinas	3
(England) Dave Ladley	6
2	(England) Dave Chisnall	3
(England) Mark Hylton	6
31	(England) Scott Rand	4
(England) Adam Smith-Neale	6
15	(England) Kevin Painter	6
(England) Paul Rowley	3
18	(England) Steve Beaton	6
(England) Sam Hill	4
7	(Netherlands) Michael van Gerwen	6
(Scotland) Keith Stephen	2
26	(England) Andy Hamilton	6
(Spain) Carlos Rodriguez	3
(England) Arron Monk	6
(Northern Ireland) Michael Mansell	3
23	(Northern Ireland) Brendan Dolan	6
(Netherlands) Jerry Hendriks	3
6	(Australia) Simon Whitlock	6
(England) Michael Barnard	5
27	(England) Andy Smith	6
(England) Peter Evison	0
11	(Canada) John Part	6
(Netherlands) Jelle Klaasen	3
22	(England) Jamie Caven	6
(England) Kevin Dowling	0
3	(England) Wes Newton	2
(England) Andrew Gilding	6
(England) Peter Hudson	6
(England) Steve Farmer	4
14	(Belgium) Kim Huybrechts	6
(England) Dennis Smith	1
19	(Wales) Richie Burnett	1
(England) Darren Webster	6

Third Round
1	Justin Pipe	6
32	(England) James Richardson	1
16	(England) Colin Osborne	2
17	(Scotland) Peter Wright	6
(England) Ted Hankey	6
25	(England) Mark Walsh	3
(Scotland) Les Wallace	1
24	(England) Ian White	6
5	(England) James Wade	2
(England) Dean Winstanley	6
12	(England) Colin Lloyd	6
(England) Aaron Turner	3
(Scotland) Jim Walker	6
(Netherlands) Roland Scholten	4
13	(England) Terry Jenkins	6
(England) Dave Ladley	1
(England) Mark Hylton	6
(England) Adam Smith-Neale	5
15	(England) Kevin Painter	1
18	(England) Steve Beaton	6
7	(Netherlands) Michael van Gerwen	5
26	(England) Andy Hamilton	6
(England) Arron Monk	6
23	(Northern Ireland) Brendan Dolan	5
6	(Australia) Simon Whitlock	6
27	(England) Andy Smith	1
11	(Canada) John Part	6
22	(England) Jamie Caven	1
(England) Andrew Gilding	2
(England) Peter Hudson	6
14	(Belgium) Kim Huybrechts	6
(England) Darren Webster	1

Fourth Round
1	Justin Pipe	6
17	(Scotland) Peter Wright	3
(England) Ted Hankey	0
24	(England) Ian White	6
(England) Dean Winstanley	0
12	(England) Colin Lloyd	6
(Scotland) Jim Walker	3
13	(England) Terry Jenkins	6
(England) Mark Hylton	6
18	(England) Steve Beaton	4
26	(England) Andy Hamilton	6
(England) Arron Monk	3
6	(Australia) Simon Whitlock	6
11	(Canada) John Part	5
(England) Peter Hudson	5
14	(Belgium) Kim Huybrechts	6

Quarter-Finals
1	Justin Pipe	2
24	(England) Ian White	6
12	(England) Colin Lloyd	6
13	(England) Terry Jenkins	4
(England) Mark Hylton	4
26	(England) Andy Hamilton	6
6	(Australia) Simon Whitlock	2
14	(England) Kim Huybrechts	6

Semi-Finals
24	(England) Ian White	4
12	(England) Colin Lloyd	6
26	(England) Andy Hamilton	6
14	(Belgium) Kim Huybrechts	4

Final
12	(England) Colin Lloyd	6
26	(England) Andy Hamilton	5
