= 2012 PDC World Darts Championship =

Tournament information
- Dates: 15 December 2011 – 2 January 2012
- Venue: Alexandra Palace
- Location: London, England
- Organisation(s): Professional Darts Corporation (PDC)
- Format: Legs (preliminaries); Sets (from Round 1); Final – first to 7
- Prize fund: £1,000,000
- Winner's share: £200,000
- High checkout: 170; Adrian Lewis; Wes Newton; Paul Nicholson; Simon Whitlock

Champion(s)
- Adrian Lewis (ENG)

The 2012 PDC World Darts Championship (known for sponsorship reasons as the 2012 Ladbrokes.com World Darts Championship) was the nineteenth World Championship organised by the Professional Darts Corporation since it separated from the British Darts Organisation. The event took place at the Alexandra Palace between 15 December 2011 and 2 January 2012.

Adrian Lewis was the defending champion having won the 2011 tournament. Phil Taylor became the last remaining player to have played in every PDC World Championship, after Dennis Priestley failed to qualify. For the first time players from Malaysia, Portugal and Serbia qualified.

Lewis was able to defend his title against Andy Hamilton in the final with a 7–3 win.

Sid Waddell, having commentated on the BDO World Championship from 1978 to 1994 for the BBC and on the PDC World Championship from 1995 to 2011 for Sky Sports, was forced to miss the 2012 PDC World Championship, having been diagnosed with bowel cancer in September 2011. He died in August 2012.

== Format and qualifiers ==
The televised stages features 72 players. The top 32 players in the PDC Order of Merit on 28 November 2011 are seeded for the tournament. They will be joined by the 16 highest non qualified players in the Players Championship Order of Merit from events played on the PDC Pro Tour.

These 48 players are joined by two PDPA qualifiers (to be determined at a PDPA Qualifying event to be held in Wigan on 28 November 2011), the winner of the PDC Youth Tour Order of Merit, and 21 international players: the 4 highest names in the European Order of Merit not already qualified, and 17 further international qualifiers to be determined by the PDC and PDPA.

Some of the international players, such as the 4 from the European Order of Merit, and the top American and Australian players are entered straight into the first round, while others, having won qualifying events in their countries, are entered into the preliminary round.

Order of Merit

1. (England) Phil Taylor
2. (England) Adrian Lewis
3. (England) James Wade
4. (Scotland) Gary Anderson
5. (Australia) Simon Whitlock
6. (Wales) Mark Webster
7. (England) Wes Newton
8. (Netherlands) Raymond van Barneveld
9. (Australia) Paul Nicholson
10. (England) Terry Jenkins
11. (England) Mark Walsh
12. (England) Mervyn King
13. (England) Colin Lloyd
14. (England) Ronnie Baxter
15. (England) Wayne Jones
16. (Netherlands) Vincent van der Voort
17. (England) Andy Hamilton
18. (England) Jamie Caven
19. (England) Denis Ovens
20. (England) Andy Smith
21. (England) Colin Osborne
22. (England) Kevin Painter
23. (Netherlands) Co Stompé
24. (England) Alan Tabern
25. (Northern Ireland) Brendan Dolan
26. (England) Justin Pipe
27. (Canada) John Part
28. (England) Steve Beaton
29. (England) Steve Brown
30. (Scotland) Peter Wright
31. (Scotland) Robert Thornton
32. (England) Mark Dudbridge

Pro Tour

1. (England) Dave Chisnall
2. (England) Mark Hylton
3. (England) Scott Rand
4. (Wales) Richie Burnett
5. (Netherlands) Michael van Gerwen
6. (Scotland) John Henderson
7. (England) Nigel Heydon
8. (Netherlands) Roland Scholten
9. (England) Steve Farmer
10. (Sweden) Magnus Caris
11. (England) James Richardson
12. (England) Dennis Smith
13. (Netherlands) Jelle Klaasen
14. (England) Michael Smith
15. (Belgium) Kim Huybrechts
16. (England) Ian White

European Order of Merit
First round qualifiers

- (Spain) Antonio Alcinas
- (Austria) Mensur Suljović
- (Germany) Jyhan Artut
- (Belgium) Kurt van de Rijck

PDPA qualifiers
First round qualifier

- (England) Arron Monk

Preliminary round qualifier

- (England) Joe Cullen

PDC Youth Tour Qualifier
Preliminary round qualifier

- (England) Paul Barham

International qualifiers
First round qualifiers

- (United States) Darin Young
- (Australia) Sean Reed
- (Australia) Geoff Kime

Preliminary round qualifiers

- (Austria) Dietmar Burger
- (Serbia) Oliver Ferenc
- (Republic of Ireland) Connie Finnan
- (New Zealand) Warren French
- (Finland) Petri Korte
- (Denmark) Per Laursen
- (Malaysia) Lee Choon Peng
- (Hong Kong) Scott MacKenzie
- (Germany) Kevin Münch
- (Japan) Haruki Muramatsu
- (Sweden) Dennis Nilsson
- (Portugal) José de Sousa
- (Philippines) Ian Perez
- (South Africa) Devon Petersen

In case a player has to withdraw from the competition, the first reserve player that will take his spot is the third-place finisher in the PDPA qualifier, Chris Thompson. It is the first time a match for third place was held at the qualifier.

== Prize money ==
The 2012 World Championship features a prize fund of £1,000,000 – the same as in the previous two years.

The prize money is allocated as follows:

Position (num. of players)		Prize money (Total: £1,000,000)
Winner	(1)	£200,000
Runner-Up	(1)	£100,000
Semi-finalists	(2)	£50,000
Quarter-finalists	(4)	£25,000
Third round losers	(8)	£15,000
Second round losers	(16)	£10,000
First round losers	(32)	£6,000
Preliminary round losers	(8)	£3,500
Nine-dart finish	(0)	£10,000

== Draw ==
The draw was made on 29 November 2011, live on Sky Sports News by Rod Harrington & Keith Deller.

=== Preliminary round ===
The format is best of 7 legs. One match is played each day with the winner playing his first-round match that same day. The draw for the preliminary round was held on 28 November 2011.

Player 1	Score	Player 2
(England) Paul Barham 76.83	2–4	(Hong Kong) Scott MacKenzie 73.23
(Japan) Haruki Muramatsu 85.22	4–2	(Sweden) Dennis Nilsson 77.20
(Austria) Dietmar Burger 67.44	0–4	(Philippines) Ian Perez 73.32
(Germany) Kevin Münch 82.74	4–2	(Malaysia) Lee Choon Peng 71.88
(Republic of Ireland) Connie Finnan 83.15	3–4	(New Zealand) Warren French 85.88
(Denmark) Per Laursen 89.76	3–4	(Finland) Petri Korte 83.31
(England) Joe Cullen 94.63	4–2	(Serbia) Oliver Ferenc 87.88
(South Africa) Devon Petersen 83.39	4–3	(Portugal) José de Sousa 75.61

=== Last 64 ===
The winners of the eight preliminary-round matches joined 56 other players in the first round. The schedule was published on 2 December 2011.

==== Finals ====
Quarter-finals (best of 9 sets); 30 December
17	(England) Andy Hamilton 102.04	5
(Belgium) Kim Huybrechts 91.72	2
5	(Australia) Simon Whitlock 95.24	5
4	(Scotland) Gary Anderson 93.29	1
2	(England) Adrian Lewis 92.41	5
10	(England) Terry Jenkins 92.19	3
27	(Canada) John Part 92.64	4
3	(England) James Wade 94.92	5

Semi-finals (best of 11 sets); 1 January
17	(England) Andy Hamilton 95.61	6
5	(Australia) Simon Whitlock 98.62	5
2	(England) Adrian Lewis 95.55	6
3	(England) James Wade 94.19	5

Final (best of 13 sets); 2 January
17	(England) Andy Hamilton 90.83	3
2	(England) Adrian Lewis 93.06	7

==== Rounds 1-4 ====
First round (best of 5 sets); 15–21 December
1	(England) Phil Taylor 99.98	3
(Japan) Haruki Muramatsu 90.26	0
32	(England) Mark Dudbridge 86.74	0
(England) Dave Chisnall 98.52	3
16	(Netherlands) Vincent van der Voort 95.70	3
(England) Mark Hylton 89.49	2
17	(England) Andy Hamilton 97.18	3
(Spain) Toni Alcinas 98.76	2
8	(Netherlands) Raymond van Barneveld 91.02	0
(England) James Richardson 89.79	3
25	(Northern Ireland) Brendan Dolan 82.38	0
(Belgium) Kim Huybrechts 88.62	3
9	(Australia) Paul Nicholson 91.01	3
(Austria) Mensur Suljović 90.36	1
24	(England) Alan Tabern 86.81	3
(Philippines) Ian Perez 86.01	1
5	(Australia) Simon Whitlock 105.11	3
(England) Dennis Smith 84.57	0
28	(England) Steve Beaton 81.80	3
(Sweden) Magnus Caris 87.21	2
12	(England) Mervyn King 98.02	3
(Australia) Geoff Kime 66.13	0
21	(England) Colin Osborne 89.81	1
(Netherlands) Michael van Gerwen 93.84	3
4	(Scotland) Gary Anderson 95.93	3
(Germany) Jyhan Artut 86.94	2
29	(England) Steve Brown 86.60	2
(South Africa) Devon Petersen 86.94	3
13	(England) Colin Lloyd 94.72	3
(United States) Darin Young 85.31	1
20	(England) Andy Smith 84.50	0
(England) Scott Rand 94.59	3
2	(England) Adrian Lewis 96.41	3
(England) Nigel Heydon 91.30	2
31	(Scotland) Robert Thornton 93.35	3
(England) Ian White 90.02	1
15	(England) Wayne Jones 94.49	3
(Hong Kong) Scott MacKenzie 85.37	1
18	(England) Jamie Caven 83.64	1
(Netherlands) Roland Scholten 83.47	3
7	(England) Wes Newton 93.30	3
(Belgium) Kurt van de Rijck 93.84	0
26	(England) Justin Pipe 88.65	3
(Australia) Sean Reed 82.29	1
10	(England) Terry Jenkins 95.39	3
(England) Joe Cullen 83.44	0
23	(Netherlands) Co Stompé 88.64	3
(England) Michael Smith 85.45	0
6	(Wales) Mark Webster 89.72	2
(Wales) Richie Burnett 95.30	3
27	(Canada) John Part 88.82	3
(Scotland) John Henderson 80.39	0
11	(England) Mark Walsh 93.80	3
(New Zealand) Warren French 85.29	1
22	(England) Kevin Painter 95.88	3
(England) Arron Monk 90.03	1
3	(England) James Wade 91.69	3
(Finland) Petri Korte 85.22	1
30	(Scotland) Peter Wright 88.40	1
(Netherlands) Jelle Klaasen 88.24	3
14	(England) Ronnie Baxter 88.79	2
(England) Steve Farmer 87.43	3
19	(England) Denis Ovens 65.64	0^{r}^{1}
(Germany) Kevin Münch 98.02	1

Second round (best of 7 sets); 22–28 December
1	(England) Taylor 100.32	1
(England) Chisnall 99.05	4
16	(Netherlands) van der Voort 93.67	3
17	(England) Hamilton 95.69	4
(England) Richardson 86.39	1
(Belgium) Huybrechts 95.61	4
9	(Australia) Nicholson 97.61	4
24	(England) Tabern 86.19	0
5	(Australia) Whitlock 96.42	4
28	(England) Beaton 90.74	1
12	(England) King 98.91	1
(Netherlands) van Gerwen 91.59	4
4	(Scotland) Anderson 93.61	4
(South Africa) Petersen 91.75	2
13	(England) Lloyd 90.78	4
(England) Rand 92.90	1
2	(England) Lewis 96.24	4
31	(Scotland) Thornton 93.01	2
15	(England) Jones 91.07	4
(Netherlands) Scholten 81.53	0
7	(England) Newton 90.66	3
26	(England) Pipe 91.83	4
10	(England) Jenkins 94.45	4
23	(Netherlands) Stompé 83.97	1
(Wales) Burnett 94.27	1
27	(Canada) Part 91.82	4
11	(England) Walsh 91.59	3
22	(England) Painter 93.12	4
3	(England) Wade 95.91	4
(Netherlands) Klaasen 84.90	0
(England) Farmer 84.89	4
(Germany) Münch 82.22	2

Third round (best of 7 sets); 28–29 December
(England) Chisnall 90.36	0
17	(England) Hamilton 99.08	4
(Belgium) Huybrechts 94.59	4
9	(Australia) Nicholson 92.47	1
5	(Australia) Whitlock 95.84	4
(Netherlands) van Gerwen 92.43	3
4	(Scotland) Anderson 100.65	4
13	(England) Lloyd 87.59	1
2	(England) Lewis 95.94	4
15	(England) Jones 93.60	0
26	(England) Pipe 96.65	1
10	(England) Jenkins 102.64	4
27	(Canada) Part 92.32	4
22	(England) Painter 93.13	2
3	(England) Wade 91.30	4
(England) Farmer 89.40	0

Quarter-finals (best of 9 sets); 30 December
17	(England) Hamilton 102.04	5
(Belgium) Huybrechts 91.72	2
5	(Australia) Whitlock 95.24	5
4	(Scotland) Anderson 93.29	1
2	(England) Lewis 92.41	5
10	(England) Jenkins 92.19	3
27	(Canada) Part 92.64	4
3	(England) Wade 94.92	5

1 Denis Ovens had to retire due to an injured nerve in his back after the first set. Münch had won the first set 3–0.

== Final ==
Final: Best of 13 sets. Referees: Paul Hinks (first half) and George Noble (second half). Alexandra Palace, London, England, 2 January 2012.
(17) Andy Hamilton (England)	3 – 7	(England) Adrian Lewis (2)
2 – 3, 3 – 1, 1 – 3, 3 – 1, 2 – 3, 1 – 3, 3 – 0, 1 – 3, 2 – 3, 2 – 3
90.83	Average (3 darts)	93.06
7	180 scores	11
147	Highest checkout	122
39% (20/51)	Checkout summary	42% (23/55)

== Statistics ==
Player	Eliminated	Played	Sets Won	Sets Lost	Legs Won	Legs Lost	100+	140+	180s	High checkout	Average
(England) Adrian Lewis	Winner	6	29	15	105	78	215	121	50	170	94.93
(England) Andy Hamilton	Runner-up	6	25	19	100	83	224	101	47	147	96.74
(Australia) Simon Whitlock	Semi-final	5	21	11	76	53	161	90	44	170	98.15
(England) James Wade	Semi-final	5	21	11	76	55	204	100	20	157	93.60
(England) Terry Jenkins	Quarter-final	4	14	7	49	36	101	77	20	126	96.17
(Scotland) Gary Anderson	Quarter-final	4	12	10	53	45	113	67	35	151	95.87
(Belgium) Kim Huybrechts	Quarter-final	4	13	7	46	33	95	57	16	128	92.63
(Canada) John Part	Quarter-final	4	15	8	45	44	108	65	17	167	91.40
(England) Dave Chisnall	Third round	3	7	5	28	25	61	36	16	127	95.97
(England) Kevin Painter	Third round	3	9	8	41	35	98	56	16	134	94.07
(Australia) Paul Nicholson	Third round	3	8	5	29	23	64	46	10	170	93.69
(England) Wayne Jones	Third round	3	7	5	26	21	74	33	14	116	93.05
(Netherlands) Michael van Gerwen	Third round	3	10	6	31	25	71	42	14	158	92.62
(England) Justin Pipe	Third round	3	8	8	34	34	89	52	13	121	92.38
(England) Colin Lloyd	Third round	3	8	6	29	29	72	28	13	167	91.03
(England) Steve Farmer	Third round	3	7	8	32	32	81	34	12	102	87.24
(England) Phil Taylor	Second round	2	4	4	19	17	46	23	5	98	100.15
(England) Mervyn King	Second round	2	4	4	19	12	38	25	12	132	98.47
(Wales) Richie Burnett	Second round	2	4	6	18	23	51	30	16	136	94.78
(Netherlands) Vincent van der Voort	Second round	2	6	6	27	24	70	27	15	148	94.68
(England) Scott Rand	Second round	2	4	4	18	14	29	21	7	140	93.75
(Scotland) Robert Thornton	Second round	2	5	5	19	23	65	29	8	121	93.18
(England) Mark Walsh	Second round	2	6	5	22	23	56	36	8	96	92.69
(England) Wes Newton	Second round	2	6	4	24	22	57	29	8	170	91.98
(South Africa) Devon Petersen	Second round	3	5	6	27	29	64	35	16	120	88.46
(England) James Richardson	Second round	2	4	4	18	18	58	28	4	145	88.09
(Germany) Kevin Münch (Note: Denis Ovens had to withdraw due to an injured nerve in his back after the first set in the first round.)	Second round	3	3	4	19	16	38	27	4	155	87.66
(Netherlands) Jelle Klaasen	Second round	2	3	5	14	16	38	12	4	120	86.57
(England) Alan Tabern	Second round	2	3	5	13	19	51	17	5	149	86.50
(Netherlands) Co Stompé	Second round	2	4	4	16	17	46	20	7	97	86.30
(England) Steve Beaton	Second round	2	4	6	20	24	59	21	3	121	86.27
(Netherlands) Roland Scholten	Second round	2	3	5	12	19	31	15	10	138	82.50
(Spain) Antonio Alcinas	First round	1	2	3	8	13	24	15	5	123	98.76
(England) Nigel Heydon	First round	1	2	3	12	14	39	15	7	100	91.30
(Wales) Mark Webster	First round	1	2	3	11	13	29	11	9	100	89.72
(England) Mark Hylton	First round	1	2	3	8	13	29	17	3	104	89.49
(England) Ronnie Baxter	First round	1	2	3	8	13	24	14	2	98	88.79
(Sweden) Magnus Caris	First round	1	2	3	10	11	30	16	2	107	87.21
(Belgium) Kurt van de Rijck	First round	1	0	3	5	9	22	11	3	136	93.84
(Austria) Mensur Suljović	First round	1	1	3	7	11	30	5	3	121	90.36
(England) Arron Monk	First round	1	1	3	8	11	22	10	3	87	90.03
(England) Ian White	First round	1	1	3	9	10	26	15	3	64	90.02
(England) Colin Osborne	First round	1	1	3	7	9	20	11	1	84	89.81
(Scotland) Peter Wright	First round	1	1	3	4	10	17	6	4	83	88.40
(Netherlands) Raymond van Barneveld	First round	1	0	3	5	9	22	5	5	130	91.02
(England) Joe Cullen	First round	2	0	3	7	11	14	10	3	83	89.01
(Germany) Jyhan Artut	First round	1	2	3	13	14	23	18	8	116	86.94
(England) Steve Brown	First round	1	2	3	11	12	31	11	3	130	86.60
(New Zealand) Warren French	First round	2	1	3	9	14	33	13	3	70	85.59
(United States) Darin Young	First round	1	1	3	6	10	23	5	3	118	85.31
(Finland) Petri Korte	First round	2	1	3	9	13	18	9	4	112	84.27
(England) Jamie Caven	First round	1	1	3	7	9	14	5	4	97	83.62
(Australia) Sean Reed	First round	1	1	3	6	9	18	8	0	121	82.29
(England) Mark Dudbridge	First round	1	0	3	3	9	16	8	1	82	86.74
(Japan) Haruki Muramatsu	First round	2	0	3	7	11	26	16	0	102	86.54
(England) Michael Smith	First round	1	0	3	3	9	23	7	1	25	85.45
(England) Dennis Smith	First round	1	0	3	1	9	13	4	2	44	84.57
(Northern Ireland) Brendan Dolan	First round	1	0	3	2	9	19	6	0	56	82.38
(Scotland) John Henderson	First round	1	0	3	2	9	16	2	2	67	80.39
(Philippines) Christian Perez	First round	2	1	3	11	10	30	17	2	110	79.67
(Hong Kong) Scott MacKenzie	First round	2	1	3	10	12	34	10	1	100	79.30
(Denmark) Per Laursen	Preliminary round	1	0	0	3	4	13	4	1	137	89.76
(Serbia) Oliver Ferenc	Preliminary round	1	0	0	2	4	6	6	0	32	87.88
(Republic of Ireland) Connie Finnan	Preliminary round	1	0	0	3	4	8	3	2	121	83.15
(Portugal) José Oliveira de Sousa	Preliminary round	1	0	0	3	4	3	4	1	83	75.61
(Malaysia) Lee Choon Peng	Preliminary round	1	0	0	2	4	11	1	0	120	77.88
(Sweden) Dennis Nilsson	Preliminary round	1	0	0	2	4	10	2	0	58	77.20
(England) Paul Barham	Preliminary round	1	0	0	2	4	6	6	0	20	76.83
(England) Andy Smith	First round	1	0	3	0	9	9	8	1	—	84.50
(Australia) Geoff Kime	First round	1	0	3	0	9	8	0	1	—	66.13
(Austria) Dietmar Burger	Preliminary round	1	0	0	0	4	5	1	0	—	67.44
(England) Denis Ovens	First round	1	0	1	0	3	1	1	0	—	65.64

Last updated: 2 January 2012
Source: Match reports from the main draw

== Representation from different countries ==
This table shows the number of players by country in the World Championship, the total number including the preliminary round.

	(England) ENG	(Netherlands) NED	(Scotland) SCO	(Australia) AUS	(Belgium) BEL	(Wales) WAL	(Austria) AUT	(Germany) GER	(Northern Ireland) NIR	(New Zealand) NZL	(Spain) SPA	(South Africa) RSA	(United States) USA	(Japan) JPN	(Finland) FIN	(Philippines) PHI	(Denmark) DEN	(Republic of Ireland) IRE	(Malaysia) MAS	(Portugal) POR	(Serbia) SRB	(Hong Kong) HKG	(Sweden) SWE	(Canada) CAN	Total
Final	2	0	0	0	0	0	0	0	0	0	0	0	0	0	0	0	0	0	0	0	0	0	0	0	2
Semis	3	0	0	1	0	0	0	0	0	0	0	0	0	0	0	0	0	0	0	0	0	0	0	0	4
Quarters	4	0	1	1	1	0	0	0	0	0	0	0	0	0	0	0	0	0	0	0	0	0	0	1	8
Round 3	10	1	1	2	1	0	0	0	0	0	0	0	0	0	0	0	0	0	0	0	0	0	0	1	16
Round 2	18	5	2	2	1	1	0	1	0	0	0	1	0	0	0	0	0	0	0	0	0	0	0	1	32
Round 1	32	6	4	4	2	2	1	2	1	1	1	1	1	1	1	1	0	0	0	0	0	1	1	1	64
Prelim.	2	0	0	0	0	0	1	1	0	1	0	1	0	1	1	1	1	1	1	1	1	1	1	0	16
Total	34	6	4	4	2	2	2	2	1	1	1	1	1	1	1	1	1	1	1	1	1	1	1	1	72

== Television coverage ==
The tournament was broadcast by Sky Sports in the UK and Ireland, RTL 7 in the Netherlands, Sport1 in Germany, Fox Sports in Australia and Showtime in the Middle East.
