= 2012 UK Open Qualifier 5 =

UK Open Qualifier 5

Tournament information
- Dates: Saturday 14 April
- Venue: Barnsley Metrodome
- Location: Barnsley
- Country: England
- Organisation(s): PDC
- Format: Best of 11 legs
- Prize fund: £34,600
- Winner's share: £6,000

Champion(s)
- (Netherlands) Raymond van Barneveld

The 2012 UK Open Qualifier 5 was the fifth of eight 2012 UK Open Darts Qualifiers which was held at the Metrodome in Barnsley on Saturday 14 April.

== Prize money ==
Stage	Prize money (Total-£34,600)
Winner	£6,000
Runner Up	£3,000
Semi Final	£2,000
Quarter Final	£1,000
Fourth Round	£600
Third Round	£400
Second Round	£200
First Round	£0
Preliminary Round	£0

== Draw ==
Second round
(England)	Martin Perring	1
(England)	Mark Jones	6
(England)	Richie Howson	4
(Scotland)	Peter Wright	6
(Australia)	Paul Nicholson	4
(England)	Arron Monk	6
(England)	Wes Newton	4
(England)	Andy Smith	6
(Spain)	Antonio Alcinas	4
(England)	Jim Walker	6
(England)	Alex Roy	3
(England)	Adrian Lewis	6
(England)	Matt Clark	6
(England)	Ross Smith	1
(South Africa)	Devon Petersen	5
(Netherlands)	Co Stompé	6
(Netherlands)	Vincent van der Voort	3
(Scotland)	John Henderson	6
(England)	Joe Murnan	4
(England)	Andy Hamilton	6
(England)	Aaron Turner	1
(England)	Justin Pipe	6
(England)	Shaun Griffiths	6
(England)	Mark Hylton	2
(England)	Joey Palfreyman	6
(Republic of Ireland)	William O'Connor	4
(England)	Jamie Caven	6
(England)	Steven Barrow	2
(England)	Matt Padgett	4
(England)	Tony Littleton	6
(Netherlands)	Michael van Gerwen	2
(England)	Kevin Painter	6
(England)	Stuart White	6
(England)	Steve Beaton	5
(England)	Sam Hill	4
(Scotland)	Gary Anderson	6
(Netherlands)	Roland Scholten	2
(Canada)	John Part	6
(England)	James Richardson	6
(Northern Ireland)	Michael Mansell	3
(England)	Stephen Hardy	3
(England)	Mark Walsh	6
(England)	Terry Jenkins	6
(India)	Prakash Jiwa	2
(Netherlands)	Gino Vos	3
(Scotland)	Robert Thornton	6
(England)	Ian White	5
(England)	James Hubbard	6
(England)	John Turnbull	0
(Australia)	Simon Whitlock	6
(England)	Josh Jones	2
(England)	Denis Ovens	6
(Netherlands)	Mareno Michels	1
(Netherlands)	Raymond van Barneveld	6
(England)	Michael Barnard	6
(England)	Ronnie Baxter	4
(England)	Darren Johnson	6
(England)	Mark Lawrence	3
(Belgium)	Kim Huybrechts	6
(England)	Terry Temple	4
(England)	Kevin Dowling	6
(England)	Lee White	2
(Netherlands)	Jelle Klaasen	2
(Northern Ireland)	Brendan Dolan	6

Third round
(England)	Mark Jones	6
(Scotland)	Peter Wright	2
(England)	Arron Monk	3
(England)	Andy Smith	6
(England)	Jim Walker	3
(England)	Adrian Lewis	6
(England)	Matt Clark	4
(Netherlands)	Co Stompé	6
(Scotland)	John Henderson	2
(England)	Andy Hamilton	6
(England)	Justin Pipe	6
(England)	Shaun Griffiths	3
(England)	Joey Palfreyman	1
(England)	Jamie Caven	6
(England)	Tony Littleton	4
(England)	Kevin Painter	6
(England)	Stuart White	4
(Scotland)	Gary Anderson	6
(Canada)	John Part	3
(England)	James Richardson	6
(England)	Mark Walsh	5
(England)	Terry Jenkins	6
(Scotland)	Robert Thornton	6
(England)	James Hubbard	5
(Australia)	Simon Whitlock	6
(England)	Denis Ovens	3
(Netherlands)	Raymond van Barneveld	6
(England)	Michael Barnard	2
(England)	Darren Johnson	6
(Belgium)	Kim Huybrechts	2
(England)	Kevin Dowling	2
(Northern Ireland)	Brendan Dolan	6

Fourth round
(England)	Mark Jones	3
(England)	Andy Smith	6
(England)	Adrian Lewis	6
(Netherlands)	Co Stompé	5
(England)	Andy Hamilton	3
(England)	Justin Pipe	6
(England)	Jamie Caven	6
(England)	Kevin Painter	3
(Scotland)	Gary Anderson	0
(England)	James Richardson	6
(England)	Terry Jenkins	6
(Scotland)	Robert Thornton	5
(Australia)	Simon Whitlock	5
(Netherlands)	Raymond van Barneveld	6
(England)	Darren Johnson	5
(Northern Ireland)	Brendan Dolan	6

Quarter-finals
(England)	Andy Smith	6
(England)	Adrian Lewis	1
(England)	Justin Pipe	5
(England)	Jamie Caven	6
(England)	James Richardson	5
(England)	Terry Jenkins	6
(Netherlands)	Raymond van Barneveld	6
(Northern Ireland)	Brendan Dolan	5

Semi-finals
(England)	Andy Smith	6
(England)	Jamie Caven	4
(England)	Terry Jenkins	4
(Netherlands)	Raymond van Barneveld	6

Final
(England)	Andy Smith	3
(Netherlands)	Raymond van Barneveld	6
