= 2012 PDPA Players Championship 2 =

Second Round
1	(England) Justin Pipe	6
(England) John Bowles	4
32	(England) Andy Hamilton	6
(England) Matthew Edgar	2
16	(Wales) Mark Webster	6
(Gibraltar) Dyson Parody	2
(Wales) Jamie Lewis	4
(Northern Ireland) Brendan Dolan	6
8	(England) Mark Walsh	6
(Northern Ireland) Michael Mansell	4
25	(England) Colin Lloyd	3
(England) Darren Johnson	6
(England) Ross Smith	6
(England) Darren Webster	4
(Germany) Kevin Münch	6
(England) Mick Todd	0
5	(England) Ronnie Baxter	6
(England) Steve Grubb	0
28	(Netherlands) Raymond van Barneveld	6
(England) Adrian Gray	4
12	(England) Steve Brown	6
(England) Adam Smith-Neale	2
21	(England) Mark Hylton	3
(Belgium) Kim Huybrechts	6
4	(Canada) John Part	6
(Spain) Manuel Fernández Josende	0
(England) Tony West	2
(England) Matt Clark	6
13	(England) Colin Osborne	6
(Scotland) John Henderson	5
20	(England) Andy Smith	3
(Austria) Mensur Suljović	6
2	(Australia) Paul Nicholson	6
(Wales) Barrie Bates	3
31	(England) Michael Smith	6
(Sweden) Magnus Caris	4
15	(Scotland) Peter Wright	6
(Spain) José Justicia	3
18	(England) Steve Beaton	6
(Scotland) Keith Stephen	4
7	(England) Dave Chisnall	6
(England) Peter Manley	3
26	(Wales) Richie Burnett	6
(England) Kirk Shepherd	1
10	(Australia) Simon Whitlock	6
(England) Arron Monk	5
23	(England) Wayne Jones	1
(England) Dean Winstanley	6
6	(Netherlands) Vincent van der Voort	6
(England) Michael Barnard	5
27	(England) Terry Jenkins	6
(England) Ian White	3
(England) Alex Roy	6
(Portugal) Jose de Sousa	0
22	(England) Scott Rand	5
(England) Shaun Griffiths	6
3	(England) Wes Newton	6
(Republic of Ireland) William O'Connor	5
30	(Netherlands) Michael van Gerwen	5
(Netherlands) Toon Greebe	6
14	(England) James Wade	6
(Spain) Carlos Jiminez	0
19	(England) Kevin Painter	6
(Netherlands) Mareno Michels	5

Third Round
1	(England) Justin Pipe	6
32	(England) Andy Hamilton	4
16	(Wales) Mark Webster	6
(Northern Ireland) Brendan Dolan	3
8	(England) Mark Walsh	4
(England) Darren Johnson	6
(England) Ross Smith	6
(Germany) Kevin Münch	4
5	(England) Ronnie Baxter	4
28	(Netherlands) Raymond van Barneveld	6
12	(England) Steve Brown	3
(Belgium) Kim Huybrechts	6
4	(Canada) John Part	5
(England) Matt Clark	6
13	(England) Colin Osborne	5
(Austria) Mensur Suljović	6
2	(Australia) Paul Nicholson	3
31	(England) Michael Smith	6
15	(Scotland) Peter Wright	6
18	(England) Steve Beaton	5
7	(England) Dave Chisnall	6
26	(Wales) Richie Burnett	2
10	(Australia) Simon Whitlock	4
(England) Dean Winstanley	6
6	(Netherlands) Vincent van der Voort	6
27	(England) Terry Jenkins	5
(England) Alex Roy	6
(England) Shaun Griffiths	5
3	(England) Wes Newton	3
(Netherlands) Toon Greebe	6
14	(England) James Wade	6
19	(England) Kevin Painter	1

Fourth Round
1	(England) Justin Pipe	6
16	(Wales) Mark Webster	5
(England) Darren Johnson	3
(England) Ross Smith	6
28	(Netherlands) Raymond van Barneveld	3
(Belgium) Kim Huybrechts	6
(England) Matt Clark	6
(Austria) Mensur Suljović	5
31	(England) Michael Smith	6
15	(Scotland) Peter Wright	1
7	(England) Dave Chisnall	6
(England) Dean Winstanley	3
6	(Netherlands) Vincent van der Voort	5
(England) Alex Roy	6
(England) Toon Greebe	0
14	(England) James Wade	6

Quarter-Finals
1	(England) Justin Pipe	6
(England) Ross Smith	3
(Belgium) Kim Huybrechts	4
(England) Matt Clark	6
31	(England) Michael Smith	6
7	(England) Dave Chisnall	3
(England) Alex Roy	5
14	(England) James Wade	6

Semi-Finals
1	(England) Justin Pipe	6
(England) Matt Clark	5
31	(England) Michael Smith	6
14	(England) James Wade	4

Final
1	(England) Justin Pipe	3
31	(England) Michael Smith	6
