= 2011 Players Championship Finals =

Because the Darts tournament hosted by the Professional Darts Corporation was moved from a February to a December staging in 2011, two editions of the tournament were held that year.

- 2011 Players Championship Finals (February) held from February 3 to 6
- 2011 Players Championship Finals (December) held from December 8 to 11
