= RDL =

RDL may stand for:

- Raheja Developers Limited, an Indian real estate development company
- Rally for Democracy and Liberty, a Chadian rebel group
- Rebellion Developments Limited, a British video game developer
- Redistribution layer, in an integrated circuit
- Régie du logement du Québec, former name of the Tribunal administratif du logement, an agency of the Government of Quebec, Canada
- 2020 Remote Darts League 1
- Report Definition Language, a computer standard
- Revolta do Leste, an Angolan nationalist organization
- Rivière-du-Loup, a city in Quebec, Canada
- Robust Details Limited, a sound insulation testing company
- Romanian deadlift, a strength training exercise
- RDL, a VLF-transmitter in Krasnodar, Russia
