= James Richardson (darts player) =

English darts player

Personal information
- Nickname: "Ruthless"
- Born: 7 January 1974 (age 52) London, England
- Home town: Rushden, England

Sport
- Sport: Darts
- Playing since: 1994
- Darts: 25 Gram
- Laterality: Right-handed
- Walk-on music: "Vindaloo" by Fat Les

Organisation (see split in darts)
- PDC: 2002–2024 (Tour Card: 2011-2014, 2016–2019)
- WDF: 2020–2024

WDF major events – best performances
- World Championship: Last 16: 2023
- World Masters: Last 128: 2022

PDC premier events – best performances
- World Championship: Last 16: 2018
- UK Open: Last 64: 2015, 2017
- European Championship: Last 16: 2016
- PC Finals: Last 64: 2017, 2019

Other tournament wins
- Years
International Open Vizcaya	2016
Remote Darts League 1	2020
MODUS Online Darts League 3	2021
Phase 3 MODUS Online darts League 4	2021
PDC Challenge Tour	2021
Denmark Masters	2022
British Classic	2022
Winmau Open Series 2	2023
ConciergeUK Senior Darts Tour 1	2025 (x2)

James Richardson (born 7 January 1974) is an English professional darts player who plays in events of the World Darts Federation. He is best known for defeating five-time world champion Raymond van Barneveld in the first round of the 2012 PDC World Darts Championship.

== Career ==
Richardson joined the PDC Pro Tour in 2011, after winning a tour card on the first day of Q School. He reached his first Pro Tour final in Gladbeck on 23 October 2011, losing 6–2 to Colin Osborne.

Richardson caused one of the biggest upsets in the history of the PDC World Championship by beating five-time World Champion, Raymond van Barneveld, 3–0 in the first round of the 2012 Championship. Van Barneveld led both the first and third sets 2–0 and had six darts at a double to win the third, but Richardson hit two 145 finishes to break Barneveld's throw in both sets. Richardson stated afterwards that the victory was "an absolute dream". He then faced Belgian Kim Huybrechts in the second round, but couldn't find the form he showed in the first round as he was beaten 4–1. In April, he earned a place in the Austrian Darts Open in Vienna by defeating Stuart Kellett in the UK qualifier. He received a bye through the first round after Adrian Lewis pulled out of the event and then beat Peter Wright 6–3. He saw off Michael van Gerwen in round three, before losing 6–3 to Dave Chisnall in the quarter-finals. He also reached the German Darts Masters and defeated Wright 6–3 once more in the first round in Stuttgart. Richardson played Wes Newton in round two and lost 6–4.

Richardson qualified for his second World Championship by finishing 43rd on the 2012 ProTour Order of Merit, claiming the 12th of 16 spots that were available for non-qualified players. He threatened to cause a major shock for the second successive year by taking the opening set of his first round match against Andy Hamilton, but went on to lose 3–1 as he missed three darts to extend the match to a deciding set. Richardson failed to qualify for the 2013 UK Open as he finished 142nd on the Order of Merit, outside of the top 96 who claimed their places. His best result of 2013 was in the fifth Players Championship where he was edged out 6–5 by Peter Wright in the last 16.

He failed to qualify for any of the European Tour events during 2014 and could only record a best of three last 32 defeats in his other events. Richardson lost the £6,000 from his ranking he earned at the World Championships two years ago and dropped to world number 102, outside the top 64 who remain in the PDC. He played in Q School and only reached the last 32 once during the four days to fail short of earning a new tour card, but he still had entry into UK Open and European Tour qualifiers as well as the Challenge Tour in 2015.

Richardson reached the third round of the UK Open for the first time by seeing off Johnny Haines and Dean Stewart, but then lost 9–4 to Nathan Aspinall. He reached the semi-finals of the seventh Challenge Tour event and was defeated 5–1 by Scott Dale.

On the second day of 2016 Q School, Richardson won back his tour card by beating six players in a row. A few days later he qualified for the first two European Tour events of the year and credited his resurgence in form to practicing with his son Joshua, who had recently won the BDO World Youth Championship. He lost 6–1 to Terry Jenkins in the second round of the Dutch Darts Masters, but at the German Darts Masters he eliminated Andrew Gilding 6–1, Jenkins 6–2 and Adrian Lewis 6–3 to reach the quarter-finals of a PDC event for the first time in nearly four years. Richardson averaged 99.25, but was defeated 6–2 by Peter Wright. He was also knocked out in the second round of the Austrian Darts Open and European Darts Open as well as the first round of the International Darts Open. This saw Richardson placed 31st on the European Order of Merit to make his debut in the European Championship. He beat Jamie Caven 6–3 in the first round, before losing 10–4 to Kyle Anderson.

In 2017 he played in the quarter-finals of the eighth Players Championship and was beaten 6–4 by Joe Cullen. He qualified for multiple European Tour events and also for European Championship (finishing in last 32) and Players Championship Finals (finishing in last 64). He made a great run in PDC World Darts Championship 2018, defeating Kim Huybrechts and Alan Norris. He lost in last 16 to Jamie Lewis, but made his best result in the event.

In 2018 he struggled for the majority of the season. He qualified for PDC Dutch Darts Masters and finished in last 16 and PDC International Darts Open, where he made it to the quarter-finals. Apart from UK Open he failed to qualify to any major events and was not doing well in PDPA Players Championships, which cost him a lot in PDC Order of Merit.

In 2019 he got eliminated in last 96 in UK Open. He qualified for three European Tour events, finishing in last 32 in PDC German Open and PDC International Darts Open, and last 16 in PDC European Darts Grand Prix. His best result of the year was quarter-finals in PDPA Players Championship 18. He qualified for 2019 Players Championship Finals, but was eliminated in last 64. At the beginning of PDC World Darts Championship 2020 he was at the edge of top 64 and needed to win at least three rounds. He defeated Mikuru Suzuki in last 96, but lost 0–3 to John Henderson in last 64. That cost him the Tour card, since he dropped out of top 64 in PDC Order of Merit.

In 2020 he attended PDC Tour Card UK Q-school, placing in last 64, last 16 and twice in last 256, which was not sufficient to get the card. After that he took part in the first four tournaments of PDC Challenge Tour, making it once into last 16. In February he play WDF Major tournament, Scottish Open, where he finished in last 16. As an amateur qualifier he qualified to 2020 UK Open, won the first round over Darren Penhall, but lost in last 128 against Rhys Hayden 4–6. In mid-March he played the Isle of Man Open, losing to Jim Williams in the last 32. During the worldwide outbreak of coronavirus, he was invited to the first edition of Remote Darts League. He finished the table in the first place, losing only one match. He defeated Jim Williams in the semi-finals and claimed the title in the final against Paul Hogan, 10–3.

== World Championship results ==
=== PDC ===
- 2012: Second round (lost to Kim Huybrechts 1–4)
- 2013: First round (lost to Andy Hamilton 1–3)
- 2018: Third round (lost to Jamie Lewis 1–4)
- 2020: Second round (lost to John Henderson 0–3)

=== WDF ===
- 2022: Second round (lost to Scott Marsh 2–3)
- 2023: Third round (lost to Wesley Plaisier 0–3)

== Performance timeline ==
PDC

Tournament	2011	2012	2013	2014	2015	2016	2017	2018	2019	2020	2021	2022	2023
PDC Ranked televised events
PDC World Championship	DNQ	2R	1R	DNQ				3R	DNQ	2R	DNQ	DNP	
UK Open	1R	2R	DNQ		3R	DNQ	3R	2R	3R	2R	DNP		2R
European Championship	DNQ					2R	1R	DNQ			DNP		
Players Championship Finals	DNQ						1R	DNQ	1R	DNQ	DNP		DNQ
Career statistics
Year-end ranking	62	43	66	-	140	66	44	55	68	-	-	-	195

WDF

Tournament	2022	2023
WDF Ranked major/platinum events
WDF World Championship	2R	3R
World Masters	1R	NH
WDF Year-end ranking	21	26

WSD

Tournament	2024
WSD Televised events
World Seniors Matchplay	1R

PDC European Tour

Season	1	2	3	4	5	6	7	8	9	10	11	12	13
2012	ADO; QF	GDC; DNQ	EDO; DNQ	GDM; 2R	DDM; DNQ								
2013	UKM; DNQ	EDT; 1R	EDO; DNQ	ADO; DNQ	GDT; DNQ	GDC; 1R	GDM; DNQ	DDM; 1R					
2016	DDM; 2R	GDM; QF	GDT; DNQ	EDM; DNQ	ADO; 2R	EDO; 2R	IDO; 1R	EDT; DNQ	EDG; DNQ	GDC; DNQ			
2017	GDC; DNQ	GDM; DNQ	GDO; 2R	EDG; 2R	GDT; 2R	EDM; DNQ	ADO; DNQ	EDO; 3R	DDM; DNQ	GDG; 1R	IDO; DNQ	EDT; 2R	
2018	EDO; DNQ	GDG; DNQ	GDO; DNQ	ADO; DNQ	EDG; DNQ	DDM; 3R	GDT; DNQ	DDO; DNQ	EDM; DNQ	GDC; DNQ	DDC; DNQ	IDO; QF	EDT; DNQ
2019	EDO; DNQ	GDC; DNQ	GDG; DNQ	GDO; 2R	ADO; DNQ	EDG; 3R	DDM; DNQ	DDO; DNQ	CDO; DNQ	ADC; DNQ	EDM; DNQ	IDO; 2R	GDT; DNQ

PDC Players Championships

Season	1	2	3	4	5	6	7	8	9	10	11	12	13	14	15	16	17	18	19	20	21	22	23	24	25	26	27	28	29	30	31
2011	HAL; DNP		DER; 2R	DER; 1R	CRA; 1R	CRA; 2R	VIE; DNP		CRA; 2R	CRA; 1R	BAR; 2R	BAR; 2R	NUL; DNP		ONT; DNP		DER; 4R	DER; 3R	NUL; 4R	NUL; 2R	DUB; 2R	DUB; 2R	KIL; 3R	GLA; 1R	GLA; F	ALI; 1R	ALI; 2R	CRA; 3R	CRA; 2R	WIG; 3R	WIG; 1R
2012	ALI; 1R	ALI; 1R	REA; 1R	REA; 3R	CRA; 1R	CRA; 1R	BIR; 1R	BIR; 1R	CRA; 1R	CRA; 3R	BAR; 4R	BAR; 1R	DUB; 2R	DUB; 1R	KIL; 1R	KIL; 3R	CRA; 1R	CRA; 2R	BAR; 1R	BAR; 1R											
2013	WIG; 1R	WIG; 2R	WIG; 2R	WIG; 1R	CRA; 4R	CRA; 2R	BAR; 2R	BAR; 1R	DUB; 2R	DUB; 1R	KIL; 1R	KIL; 1R	WIG; 1R	WIG; 1R	BAR; 2R	BAR; 2R															
2014	BAR; 1R	BAR; 1R	CRA; 1R	CRA; 1R	WIG; 3R	WIG; 1R	WIG; 2R	WIG; 2R	CRA; 3R	CRA; 2R	COV; 1R	COV; 1R	CRA; 2R	CRA; 2R	DUB; 2R	DUB; 2R	CRA; 1R	CRA; 3R	COV; 1R	COV; 1R											
2015 (Note: Not a Tour card holder)	Did not participate																														
2016	BAR; 1R	BAR; 1R	BAR; 1R	BAR; 4R	BAR; 1R	BAR; 2R	BAR; 1R	COV; 1R	COV; 3R	BAR; 1R	BAR; 1R	BAR; 2R	BAR; 1R	BAR; 2R	BAR; 2R	BAR; 2R	DUB; 2R	DUB; 2R	BAR; 1R	BAR; 1R											
2017	BAR; 1R	BAR; 2R	BAR; 2R	BAR; 2R	MIL; 1R	MIL; 4R	BAR; 2R	BAR; QF	WIG; 3R	WIG; 1R	MIL; 1R	MIL; 1R	WIG; 2R	WIG; 1R	BAR; 1R	BAR; 2R	BAR; 1R	BAR; 4R	DUB; 3R	DUB; 2R	BAR; 1R	BAR; 2R									
2018	BAR; 2R	BAR; 1R	BAR; 2R	BAR; 1R	MIL; 1R	MIL; 1R	BAR; 2R	BAR; 1R	WIG; 3R	WIG; 1R	MIL; 2R	MIL; 1R	WIG; 2R	WIG; 3R	BAR; 1R	BAR; 1R	BAR; 1R	BAR; 1R	DUB; 2R	DUB; 1R	BAR; 2R	BAR; 1R									
2019	WIG; 1R	WIG; 1R	WIG; 2R	WIG; 2R	BAR; 3R	BAR; 1R	WIG; 2R	WIG; 2R	BAR; 1R	BAR; 1R	BAR; 1R	BAR; 3R	BAR; 1R	BAR; 2R	BAR; 1R	BAR; 3R	WIG; 3R	WIG; QF	BAR; 2R	BAR; 2R	HIL; 1R	HIL; 1R	BAR; 3R	BAR; 3R	BAR; 1R	BAR; 4R	DUB; 3R	DUB; 1R	BAR; 1R	BAR; 1R	
2023	BAR; DNP					BAR; 2R	HIL; DNP		WIG; DNP		LEI; DNP		HIL; DNP		LEI; DNP		HIL; DNP		NIE; DNP												

PDC Challenge Tour

Season	1	2	3	4	5	6	7	8	9	10	11	12	13	14	15	16	17	18	19	20	21	22	23	24	Prize money	Ranking
2015	WIG; L256	WIG; L256	WIG; L16	WIG; L256	WIG; L16	WIG; L256	WIG; L256	WIG; SF	WIG; L32	WIG; PR	WIG; L64	WIG; L64	COV; L128	COV; L128	COV; L64	COV; L64									£1200	40th
2020	WIG; L256	WIG; L128	WIG; L16	WIG; L256	BAR; L128	BAR; L64	BAR; L128	BAR; L256	BAR; L32	BAR; SF	BAR; DNP														£850	27th
2021; UK	MIL; L128	MIL; QF	MIL; L64	MIL; L128	MIL; L64	MIL; L256	MIL; L64	MIL; L128	MIL; L256	MIL; L128	MIL; W	MIL; L128													£2450	12th
2022	MIL; QF	MIL; L128	MIL; L256	MIL; L64	MIL; L128	HIL; Did not participate										LEI; Did not participate									£350	157th
2023	MIL; L128	MIL; L256	MIL; SF	MIL; L64	MIL; L256	HIL; L32	HIL; L128	HIL; L256	HIL; L16	MIL; L256	MIL; L256	MIL; L256	MIL; L256	MIL; L128	MIL; QF	MIL; L64	MIL; L64	MIL; L32	MIL; L128	WIG; DNP					£2175	44th
2024	MIL; L128	MIL; L256	MIL; L16	MIL; L256	MIL; L128	HIL; L256	HIL; L256	HIL; L128	HIL; L128	HIL; L128	LEI; DNP					MIL; L32	MIL; L16	MIL; L256	MIL; L32	MIL; L128	LEI; DNP				£1000	101st

Performance Table Legend
W	Won the tournament	F	Finalist	SF	Semifinalist	QF	Quarterfinalist	#R; RR; Prel.	Lost in # round Round-robin; Preliminary round	DQ	Disqualified
DNQ	Did not qualify	DNP	Did not participate	WD	Withdrew	NH	Tournament not held	#R; RR; Prel.	Lost in # round Round-robin; Preliminary round	NYF	Not yet founded

== Personal life ==
Richardson is married to wife Carolyn, with whom he has a son, Joshua (born 1998), and a daughter, Paige. He is a full-time bricklayer. His son is a darts player as well and won the 2016 BDO World Youth Championship.
