= 2016 Dutch Darts Masters =

Tournament information
- Dates: 12–14 February 2016
- Venue: Evenementenhal
- Location: Venray
- Country: Netherlands
- Organisation(s): PDC
- Format: Legs
- Prize fund: £115,000
- Winner's share: £25,000
- High checkout: 170 (Netherlands) Michael van Gerwen

Champion(s)
- (Netherlands) Michael van Gerwen

The 2016 Dutch Darts Masters was the first of ten PDC European Tour events on the 2016 PDC Pro Tour. The tournament took place at the Evenementenhal, Venray, Netherlands, between 12–14 February 2016. It featured a field of 48 players and £115,000 in prize money, with £25,000 going to the winner.

Michael van Gerwen was the defending champion, having beaten Justin Pipe 6–0 in the final of the previous edition, and he retained his title by defeating Daryl Gurney 6–2 in the final.

== Prize money ==
This is how the prize money is divided:

Stage (num. of players)		Prize money
Winner	(1)	£25,000
Runner-up	(1)	£10,000
Semi-finalists	(2)	£5,000
Quarter-finalists	(4)	£3,500
Third round losers	(8)	£2,000
Second round losers	(16)	£1,500
First round losers	(16)	£1,000
Total	£115,000	

== Qualification and format ==
The top 16 players from the PDC ProTour Order of Merit on 15 January automatically qualified for the event and were seeded in the second round.

The remaining 32 places went to players from three qualifying events - 20 from the UK Qualifier (held in Wigan on 17 January), eight from the European Qualifier and four from the Host Nation Qualifier (both held on 23 January).

The following players took part in the tournament:

Top 16
1. (Netherlands) Michael van Gerwen (winner)
2. (England) Michael Smith (third round)
3. (Scotland) Peter Wright (third round)
4. (England) James Wade (third round)
5. (Belgium) Kim Huybrechts (second round)
6. (England) Adrian Lewis (quarter-finals)
7. (England) Ian White (second round)
8. (England) Dave Chisnall (quarter-finals)
9. ~~(Scotland) Robert Thornton (withdrew)~~
10. (Netherlands) Jelle Klaasen (third round)
11. (England) Terry Jenkins (third round)
12. (Scotland) Gary Anderson (second round)
13. (Netherlands) Benito van de Pas (quarter-finals)
14. (Northern Ireland) Brendan Dolan (second round)
15. (Austria) Mensur Suljović (semi-finals)
16. (England) Justin Pipe (third round)

UK Qualifier
- (England) Mervyn King (semi-finals)
- (Australia) Simon Whitlock (quarter-finals)
- (England) Stephen Bunting (second round)
- (England) Ronnie Baxter (first round)
- (Wales) Gerwyn Price (second round)
- (Wales) Jamie Lewis (second round)
- (Wales) Kevin Thomas (second round)
- (Scotland) John Henderson (second round)
- (Northern Ireland) Daryl Gurney (runner-up)
- (Wales) Mark Webster (second round)
- (England) James Richardson (second round)
- (England) Jamie Caven (first round)
- (England) Paul Milford (first round)
- (England) Ricky Evans (first round)
- (England) David Pallett (first round)
- (England) Ritchie Edhouse (third round)
- (England) Robbie Green (first round)
- (England) Kevin Painter (second round)
- (South Africa) Devon Petersen (third round)
- (England) Ryan Harrington (second round)

European Qualifier
- (Austria) Zoran Lerchbacher (first round)
- (Germany) Jyhan Artut (first round)
- (Greece) John Michael (first round)
- (Belgium) Mike De Decker (first round)
- (Germany) Andree Welge (first round)
- (Germany) Martin Schindler (first round)
- (Belgium) Dimitri Van den Bergh (first round)
- (Austria) Rowby-John Rodriguez (second round)

Host Nation Qualifier
- (Netherlands) Dirk van Duijvenbode (first round)
- (Netherlands) Remco van Eijden (second round)
- (Netherlands) Jermaine Wattimena (first round)
- (Netherlands) Jan Dekker (first round)

== Draw ==
First round (best of 11 legs); 12 February
(Scotland) John Henderson 84.37	6
(Belgium) Dimitri Van den Bergh 87.49	5
(Wales) Jamie Lewis 98.02	6
(Germany) Andree Welge 77.21	0
(Netherlands) Jan Dekker 79.74	3
(Wales) Kevin Thomas 81.96	6
(England) Ritchie Edhouse 90.16	6
(Germany) Martin Schindler 93.92	4
(England) Ricky Evans 91.88	5
(South Africa) Devon Petersen 95.66	6
(England) Mervyn King 92.23	6
(England) Ronnie Baxter 90.00	3
(England) David Pallett 83.82	4
(England) Ryan Harrington 83.11	6
(Wales) Mark Webster 100.92	6
(Netherlands) Jermaine Wattimena 92.97	2
(Wales) Gerwyn Price 88.92	6
(Netherlands) Dirk van Duijvenbode 80.09	3
(Austria) Rowby-John Rodriguez 89.63	6
(England) Robbie Green 89.35	4
(Australia) Simon Whitlock 90.55	6
(Belgium) Mike De Decker 83.69	2
(England) Jamie Caven 90.93	5
(England) Kevin Painter 87.63	6
(England) Paul Milford 88.43	5
(Netherlands) Remco van Eijden 90.73	6
(England) James Richardson 92.70	6
(Austria) Zoran Lerchbacher 91.68	5
(England) Stephen Bunting 94.93	6
(Greece) John Michael 72.67	0
(Northern Ireland) Daryl Gurney 98.28	6
(Germany) Jyhan Artut 93.79	5

Second round (best of 11 legs); 13 February
1	(Netherlands) Michael van Gerwen 99.49	6
(Scotland) John Henderson 92.78	3
16	(England) Justin Pipe 98.44	6
(Wales) Jamie Lewis 103.84	5
8	(England) Dave Chisnall 87.52	6
(Wales) Kevin Thomas 79.34	3
9	(Scotland) Robert Thornton	w/d
(England) Ritchie Edhouse	w/o
5	(Belgium) Kim Huybrechts 87.98	2
(South Africa) Devon Petersen 90.65	6
12	(Scotland) Gary Anderson 99.64	4
(England) Mervyn King 100.54	6
4	(England) James Wade 90.54	6
(England) Ryan Harrington 83.98	3
13	(Netherlands) Benito van de Pas 100.82	6
(Wales) Mark Webster 102.66	2
2	(England) Michael Smith 85.16	6
(Wales) Gerwyn Price 83.67	3
15	(Austria) Mensur Suljović 81.77	6
(Austria) Rowby-John Rodriguez 66.19	1
7	(England) Ian White 101.13	4
(Australia) Simon Whitlock 100.51	6
10	(Netherlands) Jelle Klaasen 91.91	6
(England) Kevin Painter 85.87	4
6	(England) Adrian Lewis 102.98	6
(Netherlands) Remco van Eijden 91.95	1
11	(England) Terry Jenkins 93.70	6
(England) James Richardson 88.31	1
3	(Scotland) Peter Wright 103.87	6
(England) Stephen Bunting 94.99	4
14	(Northern Ireland) Brendan Dolan 81.62	4
(Northern Ireland) Daryl Gurney 87.90	6

Third round (best of 11 legs); 14 February
1	(Netherlands) van Gerwen 102.65	6
16	(England) Pipe 90.90	3
8	(England) Chisnall 104.44	6
(England) Edhouse 89.15	2
(South Africa) Petersen 94.76	2
(England) King 101.82	6
4	(England) Wade 100.55	1
13	(Netherlands) van de Pas 103.67	6
2	(England) Smith 95.30	5
15	(Austria) Suljović 95.60	6
(Australia) Whitlock 91.61	6
10	(Netherlands) Klaasen 89.65	3
6	(England) A. Lewis 93.98	6
11	(England) Jenkins 88.26	2
3	(Scotland) Wright 103.27	4
(Northern Ireland) Gurney 105.18	6

Quarter-finals (best of 11 legs); 14 February
1	(Netherlands) van Gerwen 103.45	6
8	(England) Chisnall 103.72	3
(England) King 91.27	6
13	(Netherlands) van de Pas 93.62	5
15	(Austria) Suljović 102.10	6
(Australia) Whitlock 95.29	3
6	(England) A. Lewis 98.29	4
(Northern Ireland) Gurney 106.84	6

Semi-finals (best of 11 legs); 14 February
1	(Netherlands) van Gerwen 96.59	6
(England) King 88.96	2
15	(Austria) Suljović 83.51	1
(Northern Ireland) Gurney 93.46	6

Final (best of 11 legs); 14 February
1	(Netherlands) van Gerwen 112.26	6
(Northern Ireland) Gurney 96.89	2
