= Alex Steinbauer =

Austrian darts player

Personal information
- Full name: Alexander Steinbauer
- Born: 17 November 1973 (age 52) Hartberg, Austria
- Home town: Hartberg, Austria

Sport
- Sport: Darts
- Laterality: Right-handed

Organisation (see split in darts)
- PDC: 2018–
Medal record
Men's Darts
Representing Austria
EDU European Ch'ship
Silver medal – second place	2001 Poreč	Men's singles

Alexander Steinbauer (born 17 November 1973) is an Austrian professional darts player who plays in Professional Darts Corporation (PDC) events.

He made his PDC European Tour debut in the 2018 Austrian Darts Open, but was whitewashed 6–0 by Richie Burnett.

Steinbauer also qualified for the 2019 Austrian Darts Championship, but was beaten 6–4 by Kirk Shepherd.
