= Karsten Koch =

German darts player

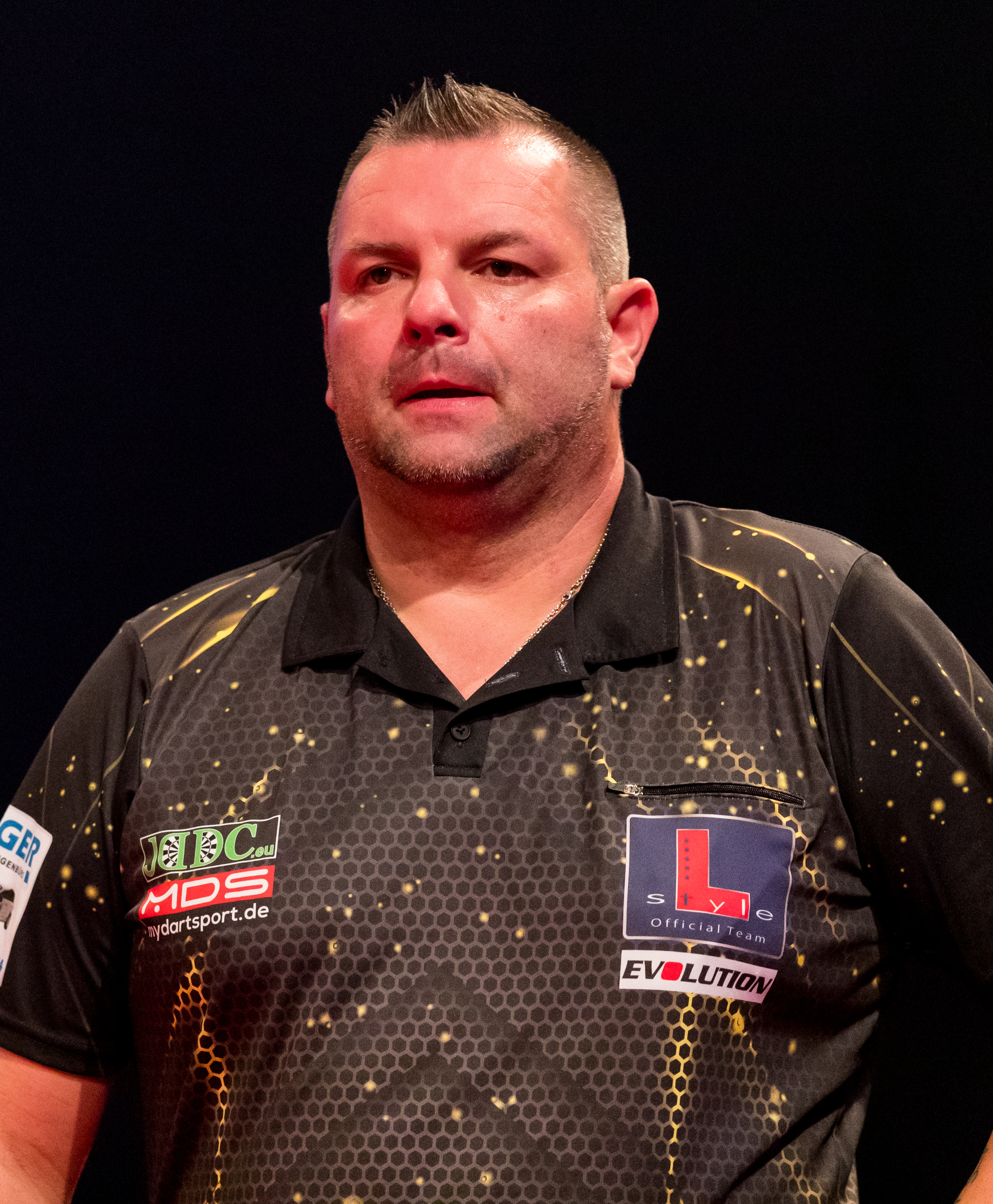
- Koch at the 2019 European Darts Matchplay

Personal information
- Born: 22 February 1977 (age 49) Viersen, Germany
- Home town: Brüggen, Germany

Sport
- Sport: Darts
- Playing since: 1990
- Darts: 21 Gram EVO Signature
- Laterality: Right-handed
- Walk-on music: "Bleed It Out" by Linkin Park

Organisation (see split in darts)
- PDC: 2007-

WDF major events – best performances
- World Masters: Last 136: 2008

Other tournament wins
- Years
| German National Championship | 2009 |

Karsten Koch (born 22 February 1977) is a German professional darts player who plays in Professional Darts Corporation (PDC) events.

Koch first qualified for a PDC European Tour event in 2019, when he qualified for the 2019 German Darts Open, but he lost to Vincent van der Meer 6-4 in the first round. He also qualified for the 2019 European Darts Matchplay, and beat Maik Kuivenhoven in his opener but then lost to Ricky Evans in the second round.
