= Jim Walker (darts player) =

Personal information
- Nickname: "The Phoenix"
- Born: 10 February 1959 (age 67) Dalbeattie, Dumfries, Scotland
- Home town: Leicester, England

Sport
- Sport: Darts
- Playing since: 1979
- Darts: 26g Phil Taylor Phase 1
- Laterality: Right-handed
- Walk-on music: "We've Got Tonight" by Kenny Rogers and Sheena Easton

Organisation (see split in darts)
- BDO: 2009–2011
- PDC: 2012–

PDC premier events – best performances
- UK Open: Last 64: 2012, 2013

Jim Walker (born 10 February 1959) is a Scottish professional darts player who plays in Professional Darts Corporation (PDC) events.

== Career ==
Walker became a PDC Pro Tour Card holder in January 2012 after qualifying through Q-School in Barnsley.

Walker's best results on the PDC Pro Tour in the early part of 2012 were at the 2012 UK Open Qualifier 3 and Qualifier 5, where he reached the last 32 both times. These were enough to see him qualify for his first PDC major, the UK Open. There he beat James Richardson, before losing to Joe Cullen 2–9 in the last 64.

Walker qualified for the first PDC European Tour event of 2012, held in Wiener Neustadt, Vienna. He played Ronnie Baxter in the last 64 and beat the world number 17 6–5, before being on the wrong end of a 6–5 scoreline to Dean Winstanley in the next round. He also qualified for three of the remaining four European Tour events, but lost in the first round on each occasion. His best result of 2012 came at the 10th Players Championship when he reached the last 16 by beating Nigel Heydon, Baxter and Roland Scholten, but then lost to Terry Jenkins 3–6. After his first year on the PDC tour, Walker was ranked world number 71.

Walker finished 61st on the 2013 UK Open Order of Merit, meaning he would enter the tournament at the second round stage. He beat Michael Bushby 5–1, before losing 7–9 to Terry Jenkins. At the Austrian Darts Open Walker saw off Leon de Geus 6–1 but was then defeated 6–4 by Mervyn King in the second round. He played in 18 events during the rest of the season with the furthest he advanced being two last 32 defeats. Walker's tour status had now expired and he entered Q School once again to try to win his place back as he started 2014 78th in the rankings, well outside the top 64 who automatically remain. During the four days of the event he was a last 16 loser twice which helped him to finish inside the top 24 on the Q School Order of Merit to earn a fresh two-year tour card. His best results in 2014 were two last 32 defeats.

In May 2015, Walker had wins over Ian White, Prakash Jiwa and Tony Newell at the 10th Players Championship event to reach the last 16 of a PDC event for the second time in his career, where he narrowly lost 6–5 to Andrew Gilding.

Walker won through to the last 16 of the sixth and seventh Players Championships in 2016, losing 6–4 to James Wade and 6–3 to Kevin Dowling respectively. He beat Maik Langendorf 6–3 at the International Darts Open, but was defeated 6–2 in the second round by Ian White.

== Personal life ==
Walker originally comes from Dalbeattie, Scotland, where he started playing darts over 35 years ago in local leagues. In the late 1980s he joined the Fire Service and moved south of the border to Surrey, later moving to Leicestershire where he lives today. He is married to Lisa and has two children.
