= 2019 German Darts Open =

Tournament information
- Dates: 26–28 April 2019
- Venue: Saarlandhalle
- Location: Saarbrücken
- Country: Germany
- Organisation(s): PDC
- Format: Legs
- Prize fund: £140,000
- Winner's share: £25,000
- Nine-dart finish: (England) Steve Beaton
- High checkout: 167 (England) Steve Beaton

Champion(s)
- (Netherlands) Michael van Gerwen

The 2019 German Darts Open was the fourth of thirteen PDC European Tour events on the 2019 PDC Pro Tour. The tournament took place at Saarlandhalle, Saarbrücken, Germany, from 26 to 28 April 2019. It featured a field of 48 players and £140,000 in prize money, with £25,000 going to the winner.

Max Hopp was the defending champion after defeating Michael Smith 8–7 in the final of the 2018 tournament, but he was defeated 6–3 by John Henderson in the second round.

Steve Beaton hit the third nine-dart finish of the 2019 European Tour during his first round match with Kirk Shepherd.

Brendan Dolan averaged 105.54 in his first round defeat to Jamie Hughes, a European Tour record for a first round losing average.

Michael van Gerwen won his 31st European Tour title, defeating Ian White 8–3 in the final.

== Prize money ==
This is how the prize money is divided:

Stage (num. of players)		Prize money
Winner	(1)	£25,000
Runner-up	(1)	£10,000
Semi-finalists	(2)	£6,500
Quarter-finalists	(4)	£5,000
Third round losers	(8)	£3,000
Second round losers	(16)	£2,000*
First round losers	(16)	£1,000
Total	£140,000	

- Seeded players who lose in the second round do not receive this prize money on any Orders of Merit.

== Qualification and format ==
The top 16 entrants from the PDC ProTour Order of Merit on 5 March will automatically qualify for the event and will be seeded in the second round.

The remaining 32 places will go to players from six qualifying events – 18 from the UK Tour Card Holder Qualifier (held on 15 March), six from the European Tour Card Holder Qualifier (held on 15 March), two from the West & South European Associate Member Qualifier (held on 19 April), four from the Host Nation Qualifier (held on 25 April), one from the Nordic & Baltic Associate Member Qualifier (held on 1 February) and one from the East European Associate Member Qualifier (held on 20 January).

From 2019, the Host Nation, Nordic & Baltic and East European Qualifiers will only be available to non-tour card holders. Any tour card holders from the applicable regions will have to play the main European Qualifier.

The following players will take part in the tournament:

Top 16

1. (Netherlands) Michael van Gerwen (champion)
2. (England) Ian White (runner-up)
3. (Wales) Gerwyn Price (quarter-finals)
4. (Scotland) Peter Wright (third round)
5. (Austria) Mensur Suljović (quarter-finals)
6. (England) Rob Cross (semi-finals)
7. (England) Adrian Lewis (quarter-finals)
8. (England) James Wade (third round)
9. (Wales) Jonny Clayton (second round)
10. (Germany) Max Hopp (second round)
11. (England) Joe Cullen (third round)
12. (Northern Ireland) Daryl Gurney (third round)
13. (England) Dave Chisnall (semi-finals)
14. (Australia) Simon Whitlock (second round)
15. (England) Darren Webster (third round)
16. (Netherlands) Jermaine Wattimena (second round)

UK Qualifier
- (England) Ted Evetts (second round)
- (England) David Pallett (second round)
- (England) Steve West (first round)
- (England) James Wilson (first round)
- (England) Stephen Bunting (first round)
- (England) Steve Beaton (second round)
- (Republic of Ireland) Steve Lennon (second round)
- (England) Chris Dobey (second round)
- (Scotland) John Henderson (third round)
- (Australia) Kyle Anderson (first round)
- (England) Kirk Shepherd (first round)
- (Northern Ireland) Mickey Mansell (second round)
- (England) Wayne Jones (first round)
- (England) Nathan Aspinall (quarter-finals)
- (England) Luke Humphries (second round)
- (England) James Richardson (second round)
- (Northern Ireland) Brendan Dolan (first round)
- (England) Jamie Hughes (third round)

European Qualifier
- (Netherlands) Vincent Kamphuis (first round)
- (Belgium) Dimitri Van den Bergh (second round)
- (Germany) Gabriel Clemens (first round)
- (Netherlands) Jeffrey de Zwaan (second round)
- (Netherlands) Vincent van der Meer (second round)
- (Netherlands) Raymond van Barneveld (third round)

West/South European Qualifier
- (Belgium) Mike De Decker (first round)
- (Netherlands) Jerry Hendriks (second round)

Host Nation Qualifier
- (Germany) Thomas Köhnlein (first round)
- (Germany) Karsten Koch (first round)
- (Germany) Lukas Wenig (first round)
- (Germany) Kevin Münch (first round)

Nordic & Baltic Qualifier
- (Sweden) Dennis Nilsson (first round)

East European Qualifier
- (Czech Republic) Pavel Jirkal (first round)

== Draw ==
First round (best of 11 legs); 26 April
(Belgium) Dimitri Van den Bergh 80.42	6
(Germany) Thomas Köhnlein 78.35	2
(Germany) Gabriel Clemens 92.23	3
(Netherlands) Raymond van Barneveld 99.47	6
(Czech Republic) Pavel Jirkal 87.53	0
(England) Luke Humphries 98.02	6
(England) Nathan Aspinall 96.03	6
(Sweden) Dennis Nilsson 85.03	1
(Northern Ireland) Mickey Mansell 94.63	6
(England) Steve West 88.59	3
(Belgium) Mike De Decker 93.79	5
(England) David Pallett 91.34	6
(Germany) Kevin Münch 78.27	1
(Republic of Ireland) Steve Lennon 91.97	6
(England) Ted Evetts 99.58	6
(Netherlands) Vincent Kamphuis 79.03	1
(Australia) Kyle Anderson 95.60	3
(Netherlands) Jeffrey de Zwaan 102.82	6
(Germany) Karsten Koch 71.61	4
(Netherlands) Vincent van der Meer 81.21	6
(England) James Richardson 98.06	6
(England) Wayne Jones 94.61	5
(England) Stephen Bunting 94.59	5
(Scotland) John Henderson 96.84	6
(Germany) Lukas Wenig 86.65	4
(England) Chris Dobey 87.23	6
(Netherlands) Jerry Hendriks 84.89	6
(England) James Wilson 83.52	3
(England) Kirk Shepherd 93.22	3
(England) Steve Beaton 102.78	6
(England) Jamie Hughes 100.37	6
(Northern Ireland) Brendan Dolan 105.54	4

Second round (best of 11 legs); 27 April
1	(Netherlands) Michael van Gerwen 88.70	6
(Belgium) Dimitri Van den Bergh 78.94	1
16	(Netherlands) Jermaine Wattimena 93.75	5
(Netherlands) Raymond van Barneveld 94.04	6
8	(England) James Wade 96.47	6
(England) Luke Humphries 96.55	5
9	(Wales) Jonny Clayton 92.79	3
(England) Nathan Aspinall 100.02	6
5	(Austria) Mensur Suljović 93.18	6
(Northern Ireland) Mickey Mansell 93.38	5
12	(Northern Ireland) Daryl Gurney 91.63	6
(England) David Pallett 83.30	2
4	(Scotland) Peter Wright 101.79	6
(Republic of Ireland) Steve Lennon 90.21	2
13	(England) Dave Chisnall 90.97	6
(England) Ted Evetts 89.83	3
2	(England) Ian White 101.67	6
(Netherlands) Jeffrey de Zwaan 95.60	3
15	(England) Darren Webster 93.65	6
(Netherlands) Vincent van der Meer 87.66	3
7	(England) Adrian Lewis 94.65	6
(England) James Richardson 96.25	3
10	(Germany) Max Hopp 96.02	3
(Scotland) John Henderson 97.03	6
6	(England) Rob Cross 102.44	6
(England) Chris Dobey 93.80	4
11	(England) Joe Cullen 86.65	6
(Netherlands) Jerry Hendriks 81.00	1
3	(Wales) Gerwyn Price 100.07	6
(England) Steve Beaton 89.53	5
14	(Australia) Simon Whitlock 95.54	4
(England) Jamie Hughes 99.17	6

Third round (best of 11 legs); 28 April
1	(Netherlands) van Gerwen 100.60	6
(Netherlands) van Barneveld 90.07	5
8	(England) Wade 99.08	2
(England) Aspinall 107.92	6
5	(Austria) Suljović 99.99	6
12	(Northern Ireland) Gurney 92.31	3
4	(Scotland) Wright 99.80	1
13	(England) Chisnall 106.13	6
2	(England) White 89.20	6
15	(England) Webster 81.69	2
7	(England) Lewis 85.51	6
(Scotland) Henderson 84.00	3
6	(England) Cross 101.64	6
11	(England) Cullen 94.35	3
3	(Wales) Price 94.39	6
(England) Hughes 88.24	2

Quarter-finals (best of 11 legs); 28 April
1	(Netherlands) van Gerwen 107.40	6
(England) Aspinall 101.63	5
5	(Austria) Suljović 93.13	5
13	(England) Chisnall 96.89	6
2	(England) White 96.46	6
7	(England) Lewis 92.63	5
6	(England) Cross 99.60	6
3	(Wales) Price 100.14	5

Semi-finals (best of 13 legs); 28 April
1	(Netherlands) van Gerwen 105.18	7
13	(England) Chisnall 99.26	6
2	(England) White 98.49	7
6	(England) Cross 97.95	5

Final (best of 15 legs); 28 April
1	(Netherlands) van Gerwen 100.22	8
2	(England) White 94.22	3
