= 2012 UK Open Qualifier 3 =

UK Open Qualifier 3

Tournament information
- Dates: Saturday 24 March
- Venue: Barnsley Metrodome
- Location: Barnsley
- Country: England
- Organisation(s): PDC
- Format: Best of 11 legs
- Prize fund: £34,600
- Winner's share: £6,000

Champion(s)
- (England) Phil Taylor

The 2012 UK Open Qualifier 3 was the third of eight 2012 UK Open Darts Qualifiers which was held at the Metrodome in Barnsley on Saturday 24 March.

== Prize money ==
Stage	Prize money (Total-£34,600)
Winner	£6,000
Runner Up	£3,000
Semi Final	£2,000
Quarter Final	£1,000
Fourth Round	£600
Third Round	£400
Second Round	£200
First Round	£0
Preliminary Round	£0

== Draw ==
Second round
(Scotland)	Gary Anderson	6
(England)	Nigel Heydon	2
(Northern Ireland)	Brendan Dolan	6
(Republic of Ireland)	Mick McGowan	2
(Gibraltar)	Dylan Duo	3
(England)	Joey Palfreyman	6
(England)	Andrew Cornwall	3
(England)	Stuart White	6
(England)	Ian White	4
(England)	Adrian Lewis	6
(England)	Steve Maish	6
(England)	Andy Hamilton	4
(Australia)	Paul Nicholson	2
(Netherlands)	Raymond van Barneveld	6
(Wales)	Barrie Bates	2
(England)	Adrian Gray	6
(Netherlands)	Jelle Klaasen	6
(England)	Damien Sherwood	3
(Netherlands)	Michael van Gerwen	6
(Belgium)	Kim Huybrechts	4
(England)	Ronnie Baxter	6
(England)	Adam Smith-Neale	3
(South Africa)	Devon Petersen	4
(England)	Darren Webster	6
(England)	Philip Wathen	1
(England)	Stephen Hardy	6
(England)	Steve Hine	4
(Netherlands)	Vincent van der Voort	6
(England)	Darren Johnson	6
(England)	Jason Crawley	3
(England)	Mark Jones	6
(India)	Prakash Jiwa	4
(Gibraltar)	Dyson Parody	6
(England)	Mick Todd	5
(Netherlands)	Gino Vos	2
(Wales)	Jamie Lewis	6
(England)	Andrew Gilding	5
(England)	Ted Hankey	6
(England)	Michael Smith	6
(England)	Mark Stephenson	0
(England)	Aden Kirk	2
(England)	Steve Farmer	6
(England)	Dean Winstanley	6
(England)	Alan Tabern	1
(Wales)	Steve Evans	6
(Netherlands)	Mareno Michels	5
(England)	Dennis Priestley	2
(England)	Andy Smith	6
(England)	Ross Smith	4
(England)	Steve Beaton	6
(England)	Justin Pipe	6
(England)	Mark Walsh	4
(Republic of Ireland)	William O'Connor	4
(England)	Mervyn King	6
(Wales)	Mark Webster	4
(England)	Colin Lloyd	6
(Netherlands)	Roland Scholten	1
(England)	Jim Walker	6
(England)	Tony West	5
(England)	James Hubbard	6
(England)	Steven Pearson	3
(England)	Phil Taylor	6
(England)	Adam Hunt	6
(Wales)	Richie Burnett	4

Third round
(Scotland)	Gary Anderson	2
(Northern Ireland)	Brendan Dolan	6
(England)	Joey Palfreyman	3
(England)	Stuart White	6
(England)	Adrian Lewis	4
(England)	Steve Maish	6
(Netherlands)	Raymond van Barneveld	6
(England)	Adrian Gray	2
(Netherlands)	Jelle Klaasen	6
(Netherlands)	Michael van Gerwen	3
(England)	Ronnie Baxter	5
(England)	Darren Webster	6
(England)	Stephen Hardy	2
(Netherlands)	Vincent van der Voort	6
(England)	Darren Johnson	5
(England)	Mark Jones	6
(Gibraltar)	Dyson Parody	6
(Wales)	Jamie Lewis	2
(England)	Ted Hankey	1
(England)	Michael Smith	6
(England)	Steve Farmer	6
(England)	Dean Winstanley	5
(Wales)	Steve Evans	1
(England)	Andy Smith	6
(England)	Steve Beaton	2
(England)	Justin Pipe	6
(England)	Mervyn King	4
(England)	Colin Lloyd	6
(England)	Jim Walker	3
(England)	James Hubbard	6
(England)	Phil Taylor	6
(England)	Adam Hunt	0

Fourth round
(Northern Ireland)	Brendan Dolan	6
(England)	Stuart White	2
(England)	Steve Maish	3
(Netherlands)	Raymond van Barneveld	6
(Netherlands)	Jelle Klaasen	6
(England)	Darren Webster	1
(Netherlands)	Vincent van der Voort	0
(England)	Mark Jones	6
(Gibraltar)	Dyson Parody	4
(England)	Michael Smith	6
(England)	Steve Farmer	1
(England)	Andy Smith	6
(England)	Justin Pipe	3
(England)	Colin Lloyd	6
(England)	James Hubbard	1
(England)	Phil Taylor	6

Quarter-finals
(Northern Ireland)	Brendan Dolan	6
(Netherlands)	Raymond van Barneveld	4
(Netherlands)	Jelle Klaasen	4
(England)	Mark Jones	6
(England)	Michael Smith	6
(England)	Andy Smith	5
(England)	Colin Lloyd	5
(England)	Phil Taylor	6

Semi-finals
(Northern Ireland)	Brendan Dolan	6
(England)	Mark Jones	4
(England)	Michael Smith	2
(England)	Phil Taylor	6

Final
(Northern Ireland)	Brendan Dolan	2
(England)	Phil Taylor	6
