= 2019 European Darts Matchplay =

Tournament information
- Dates: 6–8 September 2019
- Venue: Maimarkthalle
- Location: Mannheim
- Country: Germany
- Organisation(s): PDC
- Format: Legs
- Prize fund: £140,000
- Winner's share: £25,000
- High checkout: 170 (Germany) Karsten Koch (Scotland) Robert Thornton (England) James Wade (England) Joe Cullen

Champion(s)
- (England) Joe Cullen

The 2019 European Darts Matchplay was the eleventh of thirteen PDC European Tour events on the 2019 PDC Pro Tour. The tournament took place at the Maimarkthalle, Mannheim, Germany, from 6–8 September 2019. It featured a field of 48 players and £140,000 in prize money, with £25,000 going to the winner.

Michael van Gerwen was the defending champion after defeating William O'Connor 8–2 in the previous year's final. Van Gerwen reached a third European Tour final in five events, but lost in his third successive final appearance as Joe Cullen won his first stage title with an 8–5 success.

== Prize money ==
This is how the prize money is divided:

Stage (num. of players)		Prize money
Winner	(1)	£25,000
Runner-up	(1)	£10,000
Semi-finalists	(2)	£6,500
Quarter-finalists	(4)	£5,000
Third round losers	(8)	£3,000
Second round losers	(16)	£2,000*
First round losers	(16)	£1,000
Total	£140,000	

- Seeded players who lose in the second round do not receive this prize money on any Orders of Merit.

== Qualification and format ==
The top 16 entrants from the PDC ProTour Order of Merit on 25 June will automatically qualify for the event and will be seeded in the second round.

The remaining 32 places will go to players from six qualifying events – 18 from the UK Tour Card Holder Qualifier (held on 2 August), six from the European Tour Card Holder Qualifier (held on 2 August), two from the West & South European Associate Member Qualifier (held on 5 September), four from the Host Nation Qualifier (held on 5 September), one from the Nordic & Baltic Qualifier (held on 23 August), and one from the East European Qualifier (held on 24 August).

From 2019, the Host Nation, Nordic & Baltic and East European Qualifiers will only be available to non-Tour Card holders. Any Tour Card holders from the applicable regions will have to play the main European Qualifier.

The following players will take part in the tournament:

Top 16

1. (Netherlands) Michael van Gerwen (runner-up)
2. (England) Ian White (third round)
3. (Wales) Gerwyn Price (third round)
4. (England) Dave Chisnall (semi-finals)
5. (Northern Ireland) Daryl Gurney (third round)
6. (Scotland) Peter Wright (second round)
7. (England) James Wade (semi-finals)
8. (England) Adrian Lewis (third round)
9. (Poland) Krzysztof Ratajski (quarter-finals)
10. (England) Nathan Aspinall (second round)
11. (England) Joe Cullen (champion)
12. (England) Rob Cross (quarter-finals)
13. (England) Ricky Evans (third round)
14. (England) Glen Durrant (quarter-finals)
15. (Wales) Jonny Clayton (quarter-finals)
16. (Austria) Mensur Suljović (third round)

UK Qualifier
- (England) Michael Smith (second round)
- (England) Simon Stevenson (second round)
- (Australia) Simon Whitlock (first round)
- (England) Mark McGeeney (first round)
- (England) Jamie Hughes (second round)
- (England) Ryan Meikle (second round)
- (England) Scott Taylor (second round)
- (Scotland) John Henderson (second round)
- (England) Keegan Brown (second round)
- (England) Ryan Joyce (first round)
- (Republic of Ireland) Steve Lennon (first round)
- (Scotland) Robert Thornton (first round)
- (England) Bradley Brooks (second round)
- (England) Ross Smith (first round)
- (Republic of Ireland) William O'Connor (third round)
- (England) Brett Claydon (first round)
- (England) Matthew Edgar (first round)
- (England) Wayne Jones (third round)

European Qualifier
- (Netherlands) Dirk van Duijvenbode (second round)
- (Netherlands) Jeffrey de Zwaan (first round)
- (Netherlands) Maik Kuivenhoven (first round)
- (Germany) Max Hopp (first round)
- (Belgium) Kim Huybrechts (second round)
- (Germany) Gabriel Clemens (second round)

West/South European Qualifier
- (Netherlands) Wesley Plaisier (first round)
- (New Zealand) Cody Harris (second round)

Host Nation Qualifier
- (Germany) Marvin Wehder (second round)
- (Germany) Florian Hempel (first round)
- (Germany) Steffen Siepmann (first round)
- (Germany) Karsten Koch (second round)

Nordic & Baltic Qualifier
- (Sweden) Dennis Nilsson (first round)

East European Qualifier
- (Poland) Krzysztof Kciuk (first round)

== Draw ==
First round (best of 11 legs); 6 September
(England) Michael Smith 87.11	6
(Republic of Ireland) Steve Lennon 94.77	3
(Scotland) Robert Thornton 92.35	5
(Belgium) Kim Huybrechts 97.35	6
(Netherlands) Dirk van Duijvenbode 93.47	6
(Poland) Krzysztof Kciuk 82.95	5
(England) Keegan Brown 85.46	6
(Australia) Simon Whitlock 90.23	3
(Scotland) John Henderson 101.72	6
(England) Ryan Joyce 92.31	3
(Sweden) Dennis Nilsson 81.22	3
(Germany) Marvin Wehder 83.12	6
(England) Ryan Meikle 89.89	6
(England) Brett Claydon 85.91	3
(Netherlands) Maik Kuivenhoven 89.76	3
(Germany) Karsten Koch 86.64	6
(Germany) Gabriel Clemens 93.66	6
(Germany) Steffen Siepmann 76.22	2
(England) Scott Taylor 84.60	6
(England) Matthew Edgar 86.14	5
(England) Bradley Brooks 90.96	6
(England) Mark McGeeney 101.66	4
(Netherlands) Jeffrey de Zwaan 92.45	4
(England) Wayne Jones 93.84	6
(Germany) Max Hopp 80.36	5
(Republic of Ireland) William O'Connor 89.16	6
(England) Jamie Hughes 91.49	6
(Netherlands) Wesley Plaisier 90.93	5
(Germany) Florian Hempel 77.92	3
(England) Simon Stevenson 82.22	6
(New Zealand) Cody Harris 87.84	6
(England) Ross Smith 87.00	4

Second round (best of 11 legs); 7 September
1	(Netherlands) Michael van Gerwen 95.13	6
(England) Michael Smith 97.49	2
16	(Austria) Mensur Suljović 101.97	6
(Belgium) Kim Huybrechts 97.16	1
8	(England) Adrian Lewis 82.97	6
(Netherlands) Dirk van Duijvenbode 80.58	2
9	(Poland) Krzysztof Ratajski 96.17	6
(England) Keegan Brown 93.89	5
5	(Northern Ireland) Daryl Gurney 94.18	6
(Scotland) John Henderson 85.11	4
12	(England) Rob Cross 90.18	6
(Germany) Marvin Wehder 75.61	0
4	(England) Dave Chisnall 89.90	6
(England) Ryan Meikle 85.31	2
13	(England) Ricky Evans 88.13	6
(Germany) Karsten Koch 83.55	3
2	(England) Ian White 98.55	6
(Germany) Gabriel Clemens 96.14	3
15	(Wales) Jonny Clayton 93.39	6
(England) Scott Taylor 89.18	4
7	(England) James Wade 89.08	6
(England) Bradley Brooks 89.40	2
10	(England) Nathan Aspinall 92.54	3
(England) Wayne Jones 92.45	6
6	(Scotland) Peter Wright 89.73	5
(Republic of Ireland) William O'Connor 90.89	6
11	(England) Joe Cullen 93.85	6
(England) Jamie Hughes 92.57	3
3	(Wales) Gerwyn Price 102.16	6
(England) Simon Stevenson 87.02	3
14	(England) Glen Durrant 93.09	6
(New Zealand) Cody Harris 85.61	3

Third round (best of 11 legs); 8 September
1	(Netherlands) van Gerwen 105.59	6
16	(Austria) Suljović 101.82	4
8	(England) Lewis 92.08	5
9	(Poland) Ratajski 97.01	6
5	(Northern Ireland) Gurney 93.16	4
12	(England) Cross 96.06	6
4	(England) Chisnall 96.14	6
13	(England) Evans 88.00	1
2	(England) White 96.26	5
15	(Wales) Clayton 93.31	6
7	(England) Wade 91.75	6
(England) Jones 89.19	5
(Republic of Ireland) O'Connor 85.97	3
11	(England) Cullen 98.71	6
3	(Wales) Price 106.21	3
14	(England) Durrant 110.05	6

Quarter-finals (best of 11 legs); 8 September
1	(Netherlands) van Gerwen 100.13	6
9	(Poland) Ratajski 93.09	5
12	(England) Cross 87.09	5
4	(England) Chisnall 90.14	6
15	(Wales) Clayton 84.79	4
7	(England) Wade 93.27	6
11	(England) Cullen 99.29	6
14	(England) Durrant 98.72	2

Semi-finals (best of 13 legs); 8 September
1	(Netherlands) van Gerwen 100.25	7
4	(England) Chisnall 84.00	1
7	(England) Wade 98.43	5
11	(England) Cullen 103.69	7

Final (best of 15 legs); 8 September
1	(Netherlands) van Gerwen 100.18	5
11	(England) Cullen 101.30	8
