= Steve Farmer (darts player) =

English darts player

Personal information
- Nicknames: "The Train" "Tractor Boy"
- Born: 24 March 1965 West Bromwich, England
- Home town: Telford, England

Sport
- Sport: Darts
- Playing since: 1985
- Darts: 16g Target
- Laterality: Right-handed
- Walk-on music: "Boom Boom Boom" by The Outhere Brothers

Organisation (see split in darts)
- BDO: 2004–2009
- PDC: 2010–2013

WDF major events – best performances
- World Championship: Last 32: 2008
- World Masters: Semi-final: 2006
- Int. Darts League: Preliminary: 2007

PDC premier events – best performances
- World Championship: Last 16: 2012
- World Grand Prix: Last 32: 2010
- UK Open: Last 96: 2010
- PC Finals: Semi-final: 2011

Other tournament wins
- Years
Players Championships
2010

Other achievements
- 9 Dart Finish UK Open Qualifier 2012

Steve Farmer (born 24 March 1965) is an English former professional darts player who competed in British Darts Organisation (BDO), World Darts Federation (WDF) and Professional Darts Corporation events.

== Career ==
Farmer's first big run came in the 2006 World Masters, reaching the semi-finals with wins over Tony Eccles, Michael Rosenauer and John Walton before losing 6–0 in sets to Martin Adams. He then reached the final of the 2007 British Classic, losing to Co Stompé. He was then part of the England team in the 2007 WDF World Cup, reaching the quarter-finals of the Men's Singles event and helping England to victory in the Team Event.

Farmer qualified for the 2008 BDO World Darts Championship outright but lost in the first round to England team-mate Tony O'Shea. Farmer though was unable to maintain his form from the previous year and was forced to qualify for the 2009 BDO World Darts Championship and lost in the early qualifying rounds. He did though reach the quarter-finals of the 2008 World Masters, qualifying for the last 16 where he beat Gary Robson before losing to Martin Adams.

In 2010, Farmer switched to the PDC. On 4 September he reached his first PDC ProTour event final in Crawley, losing to Adrian Lewis 4–6 in the final. Two weeks later, on 19 September, he won his first career title: the Dutch Players Championship by beating Kevin Painter 6–4 in the final. This win meant that Farmer qualified for his first PDC major, the 2010 World Grand Prix. He lost in the first round against Steve Brown by 2 sets to 1. In the 2011 PDC world championship, Farmer came up against a strong player in Paul Nicholson. He lost 0–3 in sets. He reached the semi-finals of the 2011 Players Championship, but lost to an on-form Gary Anderson, 7–10.

He reached the second round of the PDC World Championship for the first time in 2012. In a tight game against number fourteen seed Ronnie Baxter, Farmer trailed 1–2 in the best-of-five-sets match. He then produced some of his best darts by hitting five 180's in taking six of the final eight legs to seal a 3–2 victory. He continued his run by beating German qualifier Kevin Münch in the second round, but was then whitewashed 0–4 by world number three James Wade in the last 16.

In March he hit a nine-dart finish in the third UK Open Qualifier during a first round match against Andy Relf. Farmer was knocked out in the last 16 of the event by Andy Smith. Farmer lost in the preliminary round of the UK Open 1–4 to Jamie Lewis, and reached the last 16 once more in his final ten tournaments of 2012, at the penultimate Players Championship where he was beaten by Gary Anderson 6–1.

Farmer began 2013 ranked world number 49. He reached the last 16 of the final UK Open qualifier where he lost 6–4 to Matthew Edgar, but the £600 he earned was enough to see him enter the tournament in the preliminary round. Farmer defeated Chris Aubrey 5–3, before being beaten 5–2 by Gareth Cousins in the first round. He played in 10 more events during the rest of the year but couldn't advance beyond the last 64 in any of them. Farmer dropped 61 places on the Order of Merit during the year to start 2014 110th in the world, well outside the top 64 who remain on the tour. He did not enter Q School and has not played in a PDC event since.

== World Championship results ==
=== BDO ===
- 2008: First round (lost to Tony O'Shea 2–3) (sets)

=== PDC ===
- 2011: First round (lost to Paul Nicholson 0–3)
- 2012: Third round (lost to James Wade 0–4)
