= Kevin Münch =

German darts player

Personal information
- Nickname: "The Dragon"
- Born: 27 July 1988 (age 38) Herne, Germany
- Home town: Bochum, Germany

Sport
- Sport: Darts
- Playing since: 2002
- Darts: 23g Bull's
- Laterality: Left-handed
- Walk-on music: "It's My Life" by Bon Jovi

Organisation (see split in darts)
- BDO: 2004–2011, 2014–2015
- PDC: 2011–2013, 2015–

WDF major events – best performances
- World Masters: Last 40: 2011

PDC premier events – best performances
- World Championship: Last 32: 2012, 2018

Other tournament wins
- Years
German Gold Cup	2009, 2015
Germany National Championships	2010
PDC World Germany Qualifying Event	2011, 2017

Kevin Münch (born 27 July 1988) is a German darts player.

== Career ==
Münch reached the last 40 of the 2011 Winmau World Masters before losing to Colin Fowler.

Münch qualified for the 2012 PDC World Darts Championship after winning the German Qualifier, defeating Bernd Roith 10–8 in the final. He defeated Malaysia's Lee Choon Peng 4–2 in the preliminary round. In the first round, he played Denis Ovens, and won the first set 3–0 before Ovens was forced to retire from the match due to a back injury. He played Steve Farmer in the second round and although he led 2–1, with chances to go to 3–1, he would lose the match 4–2. In June, he earned a place in the 2012 German Darts Championship in Berlin by defeating Alexander Tauber and Maik Langendorf in the Home Nation Qualifier. Münch played Brendan Dolan in the first round and lost 6–4. He also qualified for the 2012 European Darts Open with a win over Michael Rosenauer. Münch played Dave Chisnall in the first round in Düsseldorf and, after winning the opening leg, lost 6–1. He qualified for the remaining two European Tour Events of the season, but lost in the first round on both occasions.

He briefly returned to the British Darts Organisation, but returned to the PDC in 2015 and went on to qualify for the 2015 European Darts Grand Prix and 2016 European Darts Trophy, where he was knocked out in the first round.

On 19 December 2017 at the 2018 PDC World Darts Championship, in a major upset Münch defeated former two-time champion Adrian Lewis in the first round 3–1, before losing out to Toni Alcinas of Spain in the Last 32.

== World Championship results ==
=== PDC ===
- 2012: Second round (lost to Steve Farmer 2–4)
- 2018: Second round (lost to Toni Alcinas 1–4)

== Performance timeline ==
=== PDC ===
Tournament	2012	2018
PDC World Championship	2R	2R

=== PDC European Tour ===
Tournament	2012	2015	2016	2018	2019
Dutch Darts Masters	1R	DNQ		1R	DNQ
European Darts Open	1R	DNQ			
German Darts Championship	1R	DNQ			
German Darts Masters	1R	DNQ		NH	
European Darts Grand Prix	NH	1R	DNQ		
European Darts Trophy	NH	DNQ	1R	DNQ	NH
Austrian Darts Open	DNQ	NH	DNQ	1R	DNQ
Dutch Darts Championship	NH			1R	NH
Austrian Darts Championship	NH				1R
German Darts Grand Prix	NH			DNQ	1R
German Darts Open	NH			DNQ	1R

Performance Table Legend
W	Won the tournament	F	Finalist	SF	Semifinalist	QF	Quarterfinalist	#R; RR; L#	Lost in # round Round-robin; Last # stage	DQ	Disqualified
DNQ	Did not qualify	DNP	Did not participate	WD	Withdrew	NH	Tournament not held	#R; RR; L#	Lost in # round Round-robin; Last # stage	NYF	Not yet founded
