= 2019 Austrian Darts Championship =

Tournament information
- Dates: 30 August–1 September 2019
- Venue: Multiversum Schwechat
- Location: Schwechat
- Country: Austria
- Organisation(s): PDC
- Format: Legs
- Prize fund: £140,000
- Winner's share: £25,000
- High checkout: 161 (Netherlands) Vincent van der Voort

Champion(s)
- (Austria) Mensur Suljović

The 2019 Austrian Darts Championship was the tenth of thirteen PDC European Tour events on the 2019 PDC Pro Tour. The tournament took place at the Multiversum Schwechat, Vienna, Austria, from 30 August–1 September 2019. It featured a field of 48 players and £140,000 in prize money, with £25,000 going to the winner.

Mensur Suljović won his third European Tour title, and his first in his home country, with an 8–7 win against Michael van Gerwen in the final.

== Prize money ==
This is how the prize money is divided:

Stage (num. of players)		Prize money
Winner	(1)	£25,000
Runner-up	(1)	£10,000
Semi-finalists	(2)	£6,500
Quarter-finalists	(4)	£5,000
Third round losers	(8)	£3,000
Second round losers	(16)	£2,000*
First round losers	(16)	£1,000
Total	£140,000	

- Seeded players who lose in the second round do not receive this prize money on any Orders of Merit.

== Qualification and format ==
The top 16 entrants from the PDC ProTour Order of Merit on 11 June will automatically qualify for the event and will be seeded in the second round.

The remaining 32 places will go to players from six qualifying events – 18 from the UK Tour Card Holder Qualifier (held on 21 June), six from the European Tour Card Holder Qualifier (held on 21 June), two from the West & South European Associate Member Qualifier (held on 29 August), four from the Host Nation Qualifier (held on 29 August), one from the Nordic & Baltic Qualifier (held on 9 March), and one from the East European Qualifier (held on 24 August).

From 2019, the Host Nation, Nordic & Baltic and East European Qualifiers will only be available to non-Tour Card holders. Any Tour Card holders from the applicable regions will have to play the main European Qualifier.

Corey Cadby withdrew prior to the tournament, which meant an extra place was made available in the Host Nation Qualifier.

The following players will take part in the tournament:

Top 16

1. (Netherlands) Michael van Gerwen (runner-up)
2. (England) Ian White (quarter-finals)
3. (Wales) Gerwyn Price (third round)
4. (Northern Ireland) Daryl Gurney (second round)
5. (Scotland) Peter Wright (semi-finals)
6. (England) Adrian Lewis (third round)
7. (Austria) Mensur Suljović (champion)
8. (England) Dave Chisnall (third round)
9. (England) Ricky Evans (quarter-finals)
10. (England) Steve Beaton (second round)
11. (England) Michael Smith (second round)
12. (England) Joe Cullen (third round)
13. (Wales) Jonny Clayton (second round)
14. (Australia) Simon Whitlock (second round)
15. (England) Nathan Aspinall (second round)
16. (England) Darren Webster (second round)

UK Qualifier
- (England) Ted Evetts (first round)
- (England) Stephen Bunting (first round)
- (England) Chris Dobey (first round)
- (Northern Ireland) Gavin Carlin (first round)
- (Republic of Ireland) William O'Connor (first round)
- (England) James Wilson (third round)
- (England) Keegan Brown (third round)
- (Scotland) Cameron Menzies (quarter-finals)
- (Australia) Kyle Anderson (second round)
- (England) Kirk Shepherd (second round)
- (England) Ross Smith (first round)
- (England) Justin Pipe (first round)
- (England) Jamie Hughes (first round)
- (England) Josh Payne (first round)
- (Wales) Mark Webster (first round)
- (England) Luke Humphries (second round)
- (Northern Ireland) Brendan Dolan (second round)

European Qualifier
- (Belgium) Dimitri Van den Bergh (second round)
- (Netherlands) Jermaine Wattimena (first round)
- (Netherlands) Jeffrey de Zwaan (third round)
- (Germany) Christian Bunse (second round)
- (Austria) Rowby-John Rodriguez (quarter-finals)
- (Netherlands) Vincent van der Voort (semi-finals)

West/South European Qualifier
- (Belgium) Mike De Decker (third round)
- (Germany) Kevin Münch (first round)

Host Nation Qualifier
- (Austria) Alex Steinbauer (first round)
- (Austria) Rusty-Jake Rodriguez (second round)
- (Austria) Christian Gödl (first round)
- (Austria) Hannes Schnier (first round)
- (Austria) Dietmar Burger (second round)

Nordic & Baltic Qualifier
- (Norway) Cor Dekker (first round)

East European Qualifier
- (Czech Republic) Adam Gawlas (second round)

== Draw ==
First round (best of 11 legs); 30 August
(Australia) Kyle Anderson 93.12	6
(England) Stephen Bunting 96.73	4
(Netherlands) Jeffrey de Zwaan 90.02	6
(Austria) Christian Gödl 83.46	3
(Austria) Dietmar Burger 84.45	6
(Norway) Cor Dekker 83.48	3
(Austria) Alex Steinbauer 77.74	4
(England) Kirk Shepherd 86.54	6
(Wales) Mark Webster 91.30	3
(Belgium) Dimitri Van den Bergh 101.71	6
(England) Luke Humphries 88.99	6
(England) Jamie Hughes 88.56	5
(Austria) Rowby-John Rodriguez 86.80	6
(England) Josh Payne 86.58	5
(Belgium) Mike De Decker 90.59	6
(England) Chris Dobey 85.26	5
(England) Ted Evetts 85.50	3
(Austria) Rusty-Jake Rodriguez 88.75	6
(Austria) Hannes Schnier 82.89	5
(England) Keegan Brown 80.53	6
(Czech Republic) Adam Gawlas 99.20	6
(England) Ross Smith 98.18	5
(England) James Wilson 88.85	6
(Northern Ireland) Gavin Carlin 86.72	2
(Netherlands) Jermaine Wattimena 90.99	5
(Germany) Christian Bunse 86.62	6
(Scotland) Cameron Menzies 89.67	6
(Germany) Kevin Münch 80.30	1
(Republic of Ireland) William O'Connor 84.43	4
(Northern Ireland) Brendan Dolan 86.65	6
(England) Justin Pipe 93.59	4
(Netherlands) Vincent van der Voort 94.00	6

Second round (best of 11 legs); 31 August
1	(Netherlands) Michael van Gerwen 102.70	6
(Australia) Kyle Anderson 92.81	2
16	(England) Darren Webster 91.16	4
(Netherlands) Jeffrey de Zwaan 97.93	6
8	(England) Dave Chisnall 98.97	6
(Austria) Dietmar Burger 88.83	2
9	(England) Ricky Evans 100.09	6
(England) Kirk Shepherd 92.26	1
5	(Scotland) Peter Wright 99.97	6
(Belgium) Dimitri Van den Bergh 97.14	5
12	(England) Joe Cullen 91.91	6
(England) Luke Humphries 84.28	2
4	(Northern Ireland) Daryl Gurney 101.05	4
(Austria) Rowby-John Rodriguez 98.63	6
13	(Wales) Jonny Clayton 85.85	3
(Belgium) Mike De Decker 80.02	6
2	(England) Ian White 97.14	6
(Austria) Rusty-Jake Rodriguez 81.81	1
15	(England) Nathan Aspinall 98.92	4
(England) Keegan Brown 99.57	6
7	(Austria) Mensur Suljović 96.10	6
(Czech Republic) Adam Gawlas 84.08	2
10	(England) Steve Beaton 97.41	5
(England) James Wilson 91.51	6
6	(England) Adrian Lewis 90.83	6
(Germany) Christian Bunse 89.54	4
11	(England) Michael Smith 81.40	2
(Scotland) Cameron Menzies 85.92	6
3	(Wales) Gerwyn Price 99.30	6
(Northern Ireland) Brendan Dolan 87.90	4
14	(Australia) Simon Whitlock 95.38	4
(Netherlands) Vincent van der Voort 98.10	6

Third round (best of 11 legs); 1 September
1	(Netherlands) van Gerwen 92.82	6
(Netherlands) de Zwaan 94.85	3
8	(England) Chisnall 83.86	5
9	(England) Evans 90.63	6
5	(Scotland) Wright 85.98	6
12	(England) Cullen 89.91	5
(Austria) Ro Rodriguez 89.63	6
(Belgium) De Decker 89.14	5
2	(England) White 95.80	6
(England) Brown 89.32	2
7	(Austria) Suljović 101.95	6
(England) Wilson 94.50	2
6	(England) Lewis 89.79	2
(Scotland) Menzies 94.16	6
3	(Wales) Price 92.55	1
(Netherlands) van der Voort 103.17	6

Quarter-finals (best of 11 legs); 1 September
1	(Netherlands) van Gerwen 106.09	6
9	(England) Evans 89.37	0
5	(Scotland) Wright 88.93	6
(Austria) Ro Rodriguez 82.90	5
2	(England) White 95.98	4
7	(Austria) Suljović 98.76	6
(Scotland) Menzies 85.76	4
(Netherlands) van der Voort 90.65	6

Semi-finals (best of 13 legs); 1 September
1	(Netherlands) van Gerwen 95.97	7
5	(Scotland) Wright 103.54	6
7	(Austria) Suljović 98.74	7
(Netherlands) van der Voort 89.29	4

Final (best of 15 legs); 1 September
1	(Netherlands) van Gerwen 99.39	7
7	(Austria) Suljović 92.94	8
