= 2020 Remote Darts League 1 =

Darts tournament

- Winner
- (England) James Richardson
- Runner-up
- (England) Paul Hogan
- Score
- 10–3
- Dates
- 18 April to 27 April 2020
- Edition
- 1st
- Number of players
- 10
- Rounds
- 9
- Number of 180s overall
- 167
- Highest Checkout
- (England) James Richardson 161
- 1 | 2 >

2020 Remote Darts League, shortly RDL, was a darts tournament - the first edition in its history. The tournament was developed by Farawaysports, an organisation dedicated to providing quality remote sporting contests including pictures, data and odds, during the world-wide pandemic of COVID-19. Similar to the Premier League in terms of format, the Remote Darts League sees every player face off against each other with each player gaining points in order to play in finals night. James Richardson became the first winner, defeating Paul Hogan 10–3 in the final.

== Format ==
The RDL comprises 10 top WDF players competing over 10 days in a fast league format. Players all play each other once over nine nights with five matches taking place each evening. Each match will play out over a maximum of 12 legs with the first player to reach seven legs winning the fixture and picking up two league points. As its best of 12 legs this allows for the possibility of a match to be tied at 6-6, in this case each player will receive one point. After nine nights each player will have played each other and the four players with the highest number of league points will qualify for the final night showdown. On final night the Top 4 battle it out in two semi-finals and a grand final for the right to be crowned the first Remote Darts League champion. After a four-day break, the 10 players will compete again in the next leg of the Remote Darts League, RDL2.

== Venues ==
Due to the COVID-19 pandemic and regulations from the government, all players play from their home. All players have a webcam prepared in their home environment, through which it is possible to watch every thrown dart. The referee, Richard Ashdown, confirms the score. Viewers see both dartboards at the same time, along with the scoreboard and the referee.

== Players ==
The 10 WDF players have been chosen in advance including the former BDO World champion, John Walton or the finalist of the UK Open 2011 and European Championships 2012, Wes Newton.

Player
(England) James Richardson
(England) John Walton
(England) Alan Norris
(England) Paul Hogan
(England) Gary Robson
(England) Wes Newton
(England) Darryl Fitton
(England) Tony O'Shea
(England) Dean Winstanley
(Wales) Jim Williams

== League stage ==
=== 18 April - Day 1 ===
	Score	
James Richardson (England); 86.29	7 – 4	(England) Alan Norris; 81.03
Gary Robson (England); 83.87	7 – 2	(England) Dean Winstanley; 78.14
Wes Newton (England); 85.33	4 – 7	(Wales) Jim Williams; 90.37
Tony O'Shea (England); 86.13	6 – 6	(England) Paul Hogan; 88.81
John Walton (England); 80.10	4 – 7	(England) Darryl Fitton; 90.95
Night's Average: 85.10
Highest Checkout: (England) Paul Hogan 106
Most 180s: (England) Darryl Fitton 4
Night's 180s: 16

=== 19 April - Day 2 ===
	Score	
Jim Williams (Wales); 90.13	7 – 3	(England) Gary Robson; 90.85
Darryl Fitton (England); 84.10	5 – 7	(England) Tony O'Shea; 81.67
Paul Hogan (England); 88.02	6 – 6	(England) James Richardson; 94.56
Alan Norris (England); 87.26	7 – 3	(England) John Walton; 78.09
Dean Winstanley (England); 77.61	5 – 7	(England) Wes Newton; 79.45
Night's Average: 85.17
Highest Checkout: (England) Alan Norris 124
Most 180s: (England) Darryl Fitton and (England) Tony O'Shea 3
Night's 180s: 17

=== 20 April - Day 3 ===
	Score	
Wes Newton (England); 72.59	6 – 6	(England) John Walton; 73.70
Dean Winstanley (England); 83.59	5 – 7	(England) Paul Hogan; 85.88
Alan Norris (England); 78.54	3 – 7	(England) Darryl Fitton; 77.33
James Richardson (England); 96.18	7 – 2	(England) Gary Robson; 93.73
Jim Williams (Wales); 95.29	7 – 2	(England) Tony O'Shea; 85.93
Night's Average: 84.28
Highest Checkout: (England) Gary Robson 139
Most 180s: Five players 2
Night's 180s: 12

=== 21 April - Day 4 ===
	Score	
Tony O'Shea (England); 79.05	7 – 2	(England) Dean Winstanley; 74.11
John Walton (England); 84.89	1 – 7	(England) James Richardson; 95.05
Paul Hogan (England); 91.49	7 – 0	(England) Wes Newton; 76.84
Darryl Fitton (England); 90.91	6 – 6	(Wales) Jim Williams; 94.46
Gary Robson (England); 91.40	7 – 4	(England) Alan Norris; 79.77
Night's Average: 85.80
Highest Checkout: (England) Paul Hogan 121
Most 180s: (England) James Richardson 5
Night's 180s: 20

=== 22 April - Day 5 ===
	Score	
Gary Robson (England); 81.68	7 – 2	(England) Darryl Fitton; 78.24
Wes Newton (England); 84.41	5 – 7	(England) Alan Norris; 86.00
John Walton (England); 70.97	1 – 7	(England) Tony O'Shea; 81.92
Paul Hogan (England); 91.40	7 – 4	(Wales) Jim Williams; 85.50
Dean Winstanley (England); 79.88	2 – 7	(England) James Richardson; 95.34
Night's Average: 83.76
Highest Checkout: (England) James Richardson 120
Most 180s: (England) Wes Newton 3
Night's 180s: 15

=== 23 April - Day 6 ===
	Score	
Alan Norris (England); 77.50	0 – 7	(England) Paul Hogan; 90.70
Tony O'Shea (England); 89.22	6 – 6	(England) Gary Robson; 90.13
Darryl Fitton (England); 84.60	7 – 2	(England) Dean Winstanley; 79.83
James Richardson (England); 93.54	7 – 1	(England) Wes Newton; 82.10
Jim Williams (Wales); 94.67	7 – 1	(England) John Walton; 70.11
Night's Average: 85.24
Highest Checkout: (Wales) Jim Williams 160
Most 180s: (England) James Richardson 4
Night's 180s: 19

=== 24 April - Day 7 ===
	Score	
Dean Winstanley (England); 73.68	6 – 6	(England) John Walton; 72.70
Jim Williams (Wales); 88.29	7 – 3	(England) Alan Norris; 83.47
Tony O'Shea (England); 85.52	7 – 5	(England) James Richardson; 90.94
Darryl Fitton (England); 81.04	6 – 6	(England) Wes Newton; 82.68
Gary Robson (England); 93.34	5 – 7	(England) Paul Hogan; 98.35
Night's Average: 85.00
Highest Checkout: (England) James Richardson 128
Most 180s: (England) Darryl Fitton, (England) Wes Newton and (England) Gary Robson 3
Night's 180s: 20

=== 25 April - Day 8 ===
	Score	
Wes Newton (England); 80.30	5 – 7	(England) Tony O'Shea; 90.42
James Richardson (England); 89.65	7 – 5	(Wales) Jim Williams; 85.88
John Walton (England); 83.61	5 – 7	(England) Gary Robson; 89.24
Alan Norris (England); 92.27	7 – 2	(England) Dean Winstanley; 74.06
Paul Hogan (England); 82.47	5 – 7	(England) Darryl Fitton; 79.81
Night's Average: 84.77
Highest Checkout: (England) Darryl Fitton 160
Most 180s: (England) James Richardson 4
Night's 180s: 18

=== 26 April - Day 9 ===
	Score	
Darryl Fitton (England); 86.80	3 – 7	(England) James Richardson; 94.89
Paul Hogan (England); 88.30	7 – 3	(England) John Walton; 81.07
Dean Winstanley (England); 72.39	2 – 7	(Wales) Jim Williams; 88.56
Gary Robson (England); 80.39	7 – 3	(England) Wes Newton; 79.22
Tony O'Shea (England); 87.76	7 – 3	(England) Alan Norris; 83.73
Night's Average: 84.31
Highest Checkout: (England) Paul Hogan 151
Most 180s: (England) Darryl Fitton 3
Night's 180s: 14

== Playoff - 27 April ==
	Score	
Semi-finals
James Richardson (England); 89.10	8 – 2	(Wales) Jim Williams; 85.59
Paul Hogan (England); 91.73	8 – 3	(England) Tony O'Shea; 91.71
Final
James Richardson (England); 98.65	10 – 3	(England) Paul Hogan; 91.48
Night's Total Average: 91.38
Highest Checkout: (England) James Richardson 161
Most 180s: (England) Paul Hogan 8
Night's 180s: 16

== Table and streaks ==
=== Table ===
Two points are awarded for a win and one point for a draw. When players are tied on points, leg difference is used first as a tie-breaker, after that legs won against throw and then tournament average.

After the nine rounds, top 4 players qualify for the semifinals, where the first will play with the fourth and the second with the third.

#	Name	Pts	Matches				Legs				Scoring					
#	Name	Pts	Pld	W	D	L	LF	LA	+/-	LWAT	100+	140+	180s	A	HC	C%
1	(England) James Richardson Q	15	9	7	1	1	60	31	+29	29	108	70	25	92.94	135	34.68
2	(England) Paul Hogan Q	14	9	6	2	1	59	36	+23	23	122	90	13	89.49	151	32.60
3	(England) Tony O'Shea Q	14	9	6	2	1	56	40	+16	18	136	72	17	85.29	152	33.73
4	(Wales) Jim Williams Q	13	9	6	1	2	57	35	+22	28	134	70	11	90.35	160	36.08
5	(England) Gary Robson E	11	9	5	1	3	51	43	+8	18	98	64	19	88.29	139	32.48
6	(England) Darryl Fitton E	10	9	4	2	3	50	47	+3	20	88	59	23	83.75	160	32.26
7	(England) Alan Norris E	6	9	3	0	6	38	52	-14	18	119	38	12	83.29	124	29.69
8	(England) Wes Newton E	4	9	1	2	6	37	59	-22	16	120	33	14	80.32	120	26.81
9	(England) John Walton E	2	9	0	2	7	30	61	-31	10	98	33	11	77.25	95	20.27
10	(England) Dean Winstanley E	1	9	0	1	8	28	62	-34	7	85	48	6	77.03	116	29.47

(Q) = Qualified For The Playoffs (E) = Eliminated From Playoff Contention

=== Streaks ===
Player	Days 1 to 9									Play-offs	
Player	1	2	3	4	5	6	7	8	9	SF	F
(England) James Richardson	W	D	W	W	W	W	L	W	W	W	W
(England) Paul Hogan	D	D	W	W	W	W	W	W	W	W	L
(England) Tony O'Shea	D	W	L	W	W	D	W	W	W	L	–
(Wales) Jim Williams	W	W	W	D	L	W	W	L	W	L	–
(England) Gary Robson	W	L	L	W	W	D	L	W	W	–	
(England) Darryl Fitton	W	L	W	D	L	W	D	W	L	–	
(England) Alan Norris	L	W	L	L	W	L	L	W	L	–	
(England) Wes Newton	L	W	D	L	L	L	D	L	L	–	
(England) John Walton	L	L	D	L	L	L	D	L	L	–	
(England) Dean Winstanley	L	L	L	L	L	L	L	D	L	–	

Legend:	W	Win	D	Draw	L	Loss	—	Eliminated
