= 2011 Players Championship Finals (February) =

2011 Perform Players Championship Finals

Tournament information
- Dates: 3–6 February 2011
- Venue: Doncaster Dome
- Location: Doncaster, England
- Organisation(s): Professional Darts Corporation (PDC)
- Format: Legs; Final – best of 25
- Prize fund: £250,000
- Winner's share: £60,000
- High checkout: 157 Wes Newton

Champion(s)
- Phil Taylor (ENG)

The February 2011 Perform Players Championship Finals was the third edition of the Professional Darts Corporation tournament, the Players Championship Finals, which saw the top 32 players from the 2010 PDC Players Championship Order of Merit taking part. The tournament took place between 3–6 February 2011 and was held at the Doncaster Dome, Doncaster, England, which hosted the event for the first time, after two years at the Circus Tavern in Purfleet.

Defending champion Paul Nicholson failed to qualify for this tournament after finishing just outside the top 32 of the 2010 Players Championship Order of Merit.

Phil Taylor regained the title after narrowly defeating Gary Anderson 13–12 in the final.

== Prize money ==
Position (no. of players)		Prize money (Total: £250,000)
Winner	(1)	£60,000
Runner-Up	(1)	£24,000
Semi-finalists	(2)	£15,000
Quarter-finalists	(4)	£10,000
Last 16 (second round)	(8)	£6,000
Last 32 (first round)	(16)	£3,000

== Qualification ==
The top 32 players from the PDC Players Championship Order of Merit after the last Players Championship of 2010 qualified for the event.

1. (Australia) Simon Whitlock (second round)
2. (Scotland) Gary Anderson (runner-up)
3. (England) Colin Lloyd (quarter-finals)
4. (England) Phil Taylor (champion)
5. (England) Wes Newton (quarter-finals)
6. (England) Mark Walsh (first round)
7. (England) Jamie Caven (second round)
8. (Netherlands) Vincent van der Voort (first round)
9. (England) Adrian Lewis (first round)
10. (England) Ronnie Baxter (first round)
11. (England) Denis Ovens (first round)
12. (Wales) Mark Webster (second round)
13. (England) James Wade (second round)
14. (England) Andy Hamilton (first round)
15. (England) Wayne Jones (first round)
16. (England) Mervyn King (semi-finals)
17. (Netherlands) Co Stompé (first round)
18. (England) Kevin Painter (second round)
19. (England) Dennis Priestley (second round)
20. (England) Mark Dudbridge (first round)
21. (England) Alan Tabern (first round)
22. (England) Colin Osborne (second round)
23. (England) Andy Smith (quarter-finals)
24. (England) Steve Beaton (second round)
25. (England) Terry Jenkins (quarter-finals)
26. (Wales) Barrie Bates (first round)
27. (England) Steve Farmer (semi-finals)
28. (Wales) Richie Burnett (first round)
29. (England) Steve Brown (first round)
30. (Netherlands) Jelle Klaasen (first round)
31. (England) Justin Pipe (first round)
32. (England) Tony Eccles (first round)

== Draw ==
First round (best of 11 legs); 3–4 February
1	(Australia) Simon Whitlock 99.74	6
32	(England) Tony Eccles 87.69	1
16	(England) Mervyn King 92.25	6
17	(Netherlands) Co Stompé 89.76	5
8	(Netherlands) Vincent van der Voort 89.88	4
25	(England) Terry Jenkins 92.27	6
9	(England) Adrian Lewis 93.84	4
24	(England) Steve Beaton 93.56	6
5	(England) Wes Newton 103.14	6
28	(Wales) Richie Burnett 92.91	4
12	(Wales) Mark Webster 100.02	6
21	(England) Alan Tabern 90.70	3
4	(England) Phil Taylor 95.87	6
29	(England) Steve Brown 91.26	2
13	(England) James Wade 83.55	6
20	(England) Mark Dudbridge 84.31	4
2	(Scotland) Gary Anderson 102.93	6
31	(England) Justin Pipe 98.66	4
15	(England) Wayne Jones 90.54	5
18	(England) Kevin Painter 89.46	6
7	(England) Jamie Caven 95.78	6
26	(Wales) Barrie Bates 89.76	1
10	(England) Ronnie Baxter 92.64	2
23	(England) Andy Smith 100.07	6
6	(England) Mark Walsh 89.49	1
27	(England) Steve Farmer 94.55	6
11	(England) Denis Ovens 93.56	5
22	(England) Colin Osborne 90.63	6
3	(England) Colin Lloyd 87.18	6
30	(Netherlands) Jelle Klaasen 88.55	4
14	(England) Andy Hamilton 93.05	5
19	(England) Dennis Priestley 91.50	6

Second round (best of 15 legs); 5 February
1	(Australia) Simon Whitlock 96.78	5
16	(England) Mervyn King 97.38	8
25	(England) Terry Jenkins 89.19	8
24	(England) Steve Beaton 87.64	6
5	(England) Wes Newton 96.80	8
12	(Wales) Mark Webster 90.90	7
4	(England) Phil Taylor 100.42	8
13	(England) James Wade 90.73	3
2	(Scotland) Gary Anderson 100.29	8
18	(England) Kevin Painter 97.32	5
7	(England) Jamie Caven 86.98	4
23	(England) Andy Smith 89.57	8
27	(England) Steve Farmer 93.06	8
22	(England) Colin Osborne 89.03	6
3	(England) Colin Lloyd 95.56	8
19	(England) Dennis Priestley 86.40	3

Quarter-finals (best of 17 legs); 6 February
16	(England) Mervyn King 98.52	9
25	(England) Terry Jenkins 95.41	7
5	(England) Wes Newton 97.34	3
4	(England) Phil Taylor 103.01	9
2	(Scotland) Gary Anderson 96.48	9
23	(England) Andy Smith 100.36	5
27	(England) Steve Farmer 94.55	9
3	(England) Colin Lloyd 93.98	5

Semi-finals (best of 19 legs); 6 February
16	(England) Mervyn King 95.67	8
4	(England) Phil Taylor 98.79	10
2	(Scotland) Gary Anderson 93.92	10
27	(England) Steve Farmer 87.14	7

Final (best of 25 legs); 6 February
4	(England) Phil Taylor 97.01	13
2	(Scotland) Gary Anderson 96.31	12

== Statistics ==
Player	Eliminated	Played	Legs Won	Legs Lost	LWAT	100+	140+	180s	High checkout	3-dart average
(England) Phil Taylor	Winner	5	46	28	19	105	58	12	135	99.02
(Scotland) Gary Anderson	Final	5	45	34	17	95	58	20	142	97.99
(England) Steve Farmer	Semi-finals	4	30	22	10	67	35	14	148	92.33
(England) Mervyn King	Semi-finals	4	31	27	17	73	49	12	110	95.96
(England) Wes Newton	Quarter-finals	3	17	20	3	45	24	13	157	99.09
(England) Andy Smith	Quarter-finals	3	19	15	6	49	33	7	101	96.67
(England) Terry Jenkins	Quarter-finals	3	21	19	9	52	33	8	†120	92.29
(England) Colin Lloyd	Quarter-finals	3	19	16	5	47	27	3	155	92.24
(England) Jamie Caven	Second round	2	10	9	4	24	4	3	122	91.38
(England) Steve Beaton	Second round	2	12	12	3	26	13	8	108	90.60
(Wales) Mark Webster	Second round	2	13	11	4	32	15	5	91	95.46
(England) Kevin Painter	Second round	2	11	13	6	28	17	7	90	93.39
(England) Colin Osborne	Second round	2	12	13	5	25	17	3	150	89.83
(England) Dennis Priestley	Second round	2	9	13	4	24	16	4	150	88.95
(Australia) Simon Whitlock	Second round	2	11	9	3	26	10	9	110	98.26
(England) James Wade	Second round	2	9	12	2	27	13	2	107	87.14
(England) Justin Pipe	First round	1	4	6	4	7	9	4	124	98.66
(Wales) Barrie Bates	First round	1	1	6	0	7	4	1	96	89.76
(Netherlands) Co Stompé	First round	1	5	6	2	14	8	1	121	89.76
(England) Mark Walsh	First round	1	1	6	0	9	6	0	56	89.49
(England) Andy Hamilton	First round	1	5	6	3	14	5	1	121	93.05
(Wales) Richie Burnett	First round	1	4	6	1	12	7	1	100	92.91
(England) Ronnie Baxter	First round	1	2	6	0	6	6	2	44	92.64
(England) Steve Brown	First round	1	2	6	0	7	4	3	56	91.26
(England) Alan Tabern	First round	1	3	6	2	19	3	1	116	90.70
(England) Adrian Lewis	First round	1	4	6	1	7	6	4	96	93.84
(England) Denis Ovens	First round	1	5	6	2	21	3	4	130	93.56
(England) Wayne Jones	First round	1	5	6	4	23	8	2	68	90.54
(Netherlands) Vincent van der Voort	First round	1	4	6	1	11	5	1	102	89.88
(Netherlands) Jelle Klaasen	First round	1	4	6	0	10	7	1	154	88.55
(England) Tony Eccles	First round	1	1	6	0	3	4	1	36	87.69
(England) Mark Dudbridge	First round	1	4	6	0	11	4	2	109	84.31

† = Hit twice in Round 2 match against Steve Beaton.

== Live coverage ==
The tournament was broadcast live worldwide through the PDC's official website.
