= George Noble (darts referee) =

English darts referee (born 1968)

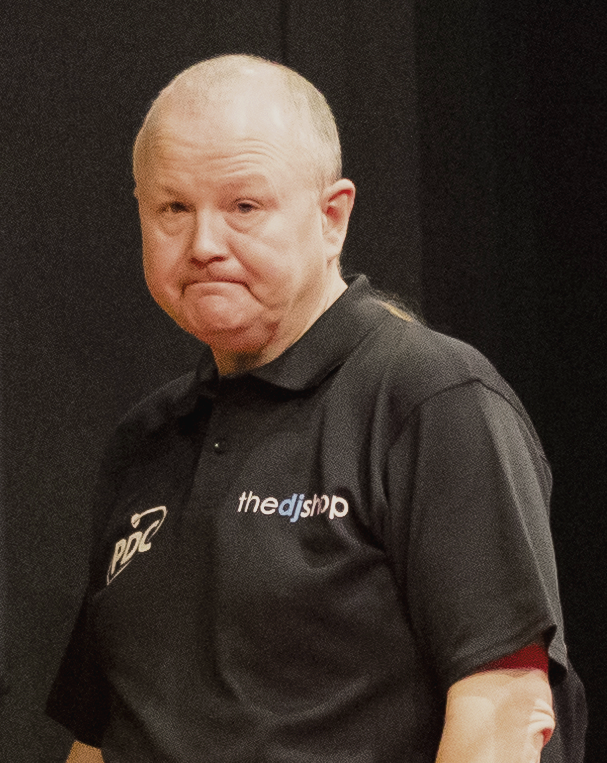
- Noble in 2019

Personal information
- Nickname: The Puppy
- Born: 17 October 1968 (age 57); Crawley, England

Organisation (see split in darts)
- BDO: 1990–2007
- PDC: 2007–2026

George Noble (born 17 October 1968) is a retired English darts referee who has worked on British Darts Organisation and Professional Darts Corporation matches. He is nicknamed "The Puppy". His final match was the final of the 2026 PDC World Darts Championship.

== Career ==
Since darts matches were regularly held in his father's local pub, Noble was regularly booked by Bobby George as a caller for his exhibitions.

He began his professional calling career in 1990 with the BDO, when he filled in for the regular caller at a tournament in Plumstead.

In 2007, he moved to the PDC. Noble has called 26 nine-dart finishes on TV including seven at the PDC World Darts Championship. He was the referee for the first nine-dart finish hit at PDC World Darts Championship done by Raymond van Barneveld in his quarter-final in 2009 against Jelle Klaasen. He was also the referee when van Barneveld hit the second PDC World Championship nine-dart finish in 2010 against Brendan Dolan. In the 2010 Premier League Darts final, Noble became the first referee to call two nine dart finishes in the same match when Phil Taylor hit two against James Wade. He called Dolan's historic nine-dart finish at 2011 World Grand Prix the first to occur in a TV match using a double in. He was also the referee for both of Gerwyn Price's perfect legs on night 3 of 2022 Premier League.

He is the event manager for MODUS and, since January 2020, the managing director of the MODUS Super Series. He has refereed in 19 PDC and 13 BDO World Darts Championships.

On May 25, 2025, he announced that he would retire at the end of the 2026 PDC World Darts Championship. His last European Tour match was the final of the Dutch Darts Championship on 25 May 2025.
