= 2019 German Darts Grand Prix =

Tournament information
- Dates: 20–22 April 2019
- Venue: Kulturhalle Zenith
- Location: Munich, Germany
- Organisation(s): Professional Darts Corporation (PDC)
- Format: Legs
- Prize fund: £140,000
- Winner's share: £25,000
- High checkout: 170 Glen Durrant

Champion(s)
- (Netherlands) Michael van Gerwen

The 2019 German Darts Grand Prix was the third of thirteen PDC European Tour events on the 2019 PDC Pro Tour. The tournament took place at Kulturhalle Zenith, Munich, Germany, from 20 to 22 April 2019. It featured a field of 48 players and £140,000 in prize money, with £25,000 going to the winner.

Michael van Gerwen was the defending champion after defeating Peter Wright 8–5 in the final of the 2018 tournament, and he defended his title by beating Simon Whitlock 8–3 in the final, which was his 30th European Tour title since its inception in 2012.

== Prize money ==
This is how the prize money is divided:

Stage (num. of players)		Prize money
Winner	(1)	£25,000
Runner-up	(1)	£10,000
Semi-finalists	(2)	£6,500
Quarter-finalists	(4)	£5,000
Third round losers	(8)	£3,000
Second round losers	(16)	£2,000*
First round losers	(16)	£1,000
Total	£140,000	

- Seeded players who lose in the second round do not receive this prize money on any Orders of Merit.

== Qualification and format ==
The top 16 entrants from the PDC ProTour Order of Merit on 5 March will automatically qualify for the event and will be seeded in the second round.

The remaining 32 places will go to players from six qualifying events – 18 from the UK Tour Card Holder Qualifier (held on 15 March), six from the European Tour Card Holder Qualifier (held on 15 March), two from the West & South European Associate Member Qualifier (held on 19 April), four from the Host Nation Qualifier (held on 19 April), one from the Nordic & Baltic Qualifier (held on 6 October 2018) and one from the East European Associate Member Qualifier (held on 20 January).

From 2019, the Host Nation, Nordic & Baltic and East European Qualifiers will only be available to non-tour card holders. Any tour card holders from the applicable regions will have to play the main European Qualifier. The only exception being that the Nordic & Baltic qualifiers for the first 3 European Tour events took place in late 2018, before the new ruling was announced.

Gerwyn Price, who was set to be the 3rd seed, withdrew prior to the tournament draw. All seeds below him moved up a place, with Danny Noppert becoming sixteenth seed, and an extra place being made available in the Host Nation Qualifier.

The following players will take part in the tournament:

Top 16

1. (Netherlands) Michael van Gerwen (champion)
2. (England) Ian White (second round)
3. (Scotland) Peter Wright (second round)
4. (Austria) Mensur Suljović (quarter-finals)
5. (England) Rob Cross (semi-finals)
6. (England) Adrian Lewis (second round)
7. (England) James Wade (second round)
8. (England) Michael Smith (second round)
9. (Wales) Jonny Clayton (second round)
10. (Germany) Max Hopp (semi-finals)
11. (England) Joe Cullen (quarter-finals)
12. (Northern Ireland) Daryl Gurney (third round)
13. (England) Dave Chisnall (third round)
14. (Australia) Simon Whitlock (runner-up)
15. (England) Darren Webster (third round)
16. (Netherlands) Danny Noppert (second round)

UK Qualifier
- (England) Keegan Brown (second round)
- (England) Ricky Evans (third round)
- (England) Alan Norris (first round)
- (England) Glen Durrant (second round)
- (England) Stephen Bunting (third round)
- (England) Steve Beaton (first round)
- (England) Nathan Derry (second round)
- (England) Chris Dobey (first round)
- (England) Ritchie Edhouse (third round)
- (Australia) Kyle Anderson (second round)
- (England) Josh Payne (second round)
- (England) Ted Evetts (quarter-finals)
- (Scotland) Mark Barilli (first round)
- (England) Ross Smith (third round)
- (England) Arron Monk (second round)
- (England) Mark Wilson (first round)
- (Northern Ireland) Brendan Dolan (first round)
- (England) Jamie Hughes (first round)

European Qualifier
- (Belgium) Kim Huybrechts (third round)
- (Poland) Krzysztof Ratajski (second round)
- (Germany) Gabriel Clemens (first round)
- (Spain) Cristo Reyes (second round)
- (Germany) Martin Schindler (first round)

West/South European Qualifier
- (Austria) Michael Rasztovits (second round)
- (Brazil) Diogo Portela (first round)

Host Nation Qualifier
- (Germany) Michael Hurtz (first round)
- (Germany) Kevin Münch (first round)
- (Germany) Marko Puls (first round)
- (Germany) Dragutin Horvat (first round)
- (Germany) Jyhan Artut (first round)

Nordic & Baltic Qualifier
- (Sweden) Magnus Caris (first round)

East European Qualifier
- (Czech Republic) Karel Sedláček (quarter-finals)

== Draw ==
First round (best of 11 legs); 20 April
(Poland) Krzysztof Ratajski 97.90	6
(Germany) Martin Schindler 86.02	2
(England) Alan Norris 90.42	1
(England) Stephen Bunting 99.70	6
(Germany) Gabriel Clemens 90.87	5
(England) Ricky Evans 97.25	6
(England) Ted Evetts 96.66	6
(England) Mark Wilson 87.61	2
(England) Chris Dobey 85.77	3
(Austria) Michael Rasztovits 93.53	6
(Australia) Kyle Anderson 86.45	6
(Germany) Kevin Münch 82.70	2
(England) Josh Payne 91.82	6
(Germany) Jyhan Artut 81.71	2
(England) Arron Monk 95.74	6
(Germany) Marko Puls 74.13	3
(Czech Republic) Karel Sedláček 92.18	6
(Brazil) Diogo Portela 85.37	4
(England) Steve Beaton 91.49	1
(England) Nathan Derry 96.17	6
(Belgium) Kim Huybrechts 93.47	6
(Germany) Dragutin Horvat 86.28	5
(England) Keegan Brown 90.78	6
(Sweden) Magnus Caris 82.19	5
(England) Ritchie Edhouse 92.64	6
(Northern Ireland) Brendan Dolan 92.62	4
(England) Jamie Hughes 95.33	1
(England) Glen Durrant 99.06	6
(England) Ross Smith 90.19	6
(Scotland) Mark Barilli 83.03	3
(Germany) Michael Hurtz 78.28	2
(Spain) Cristo Reyes 87.16	6

Second round (best of 11 legs); 21 April
1	(Netherlands) Michael van Gerwen 102.02	6
(Poland) Krzysztof Ratajski 101.41	4
16	(Netherlands) Danny Noppert 90.81	1
(England) Stephen Bunting 93.05	6
8	(England) Michael Smith 84.27	0
(England) Ricky Evans 87.55	6
9	(Wales) Jonny Clayton 93.72	2
(England) Ted Evetts 97.50	6
5	(England) Rob Cross 93.52	6
(Austria) Michael Rasztovits 86.48	3
12	(Northern Ireland) Daryl Gurney 97.10	6
(Australia) Kyle Anderson 94.57	4
4	(Austria) Mensur Suljović 100.07	6
(England) Josh Payne 91.18	2
13	(England) Dave Chisnall 108.96	6
(England) Arron Monk 103.86	2
2	(England) Ian White 81.08	4
(Czech Republic) Karel Sedláček 79.29	6
15	(England) Darren Webster 97.56	6
(England) Nathan Derry 82.68	1
7	(England) James Wade 95.83	5
(Belgium) Kim Huybrechts 96.43	6
10	(Germany) Max Hopp 90.43	6
(England) Keegan Brown 87.88	3
6	(England) Adrian Lewis 94.84	5
(England) Ritchie Edhouse 92.78	6
11	(England) Joe Cullen 99.63	6
(England) Glen Durrant 97.12	5
3	(Scotland) Peter Wright 94.88	4
(England) Ross Smith 98.02	6
14	(Australia) Simon Whitlock 92.94	6
(Spain) Cristo Reyes 92.33	4

Third round (best of 11 legs); 22 April
1	(Netherlands) van Gerwen 106.13	6
(England) Bunting 88.76	1
(England) Evans 99.44	4
(England) Evetts 95.83	6
5	(England) Cross 110.98	6
12	(Northern Ireland) Gurney 101.91	5
4	(Austria) Suljović 94.29	6
13	(England) Chisnall 100.14	5
(Czech Republic) Sedláček 96.55	6
15	(England) Webster 90.02	5
(Belgium) Huybrechts 92.60	3
10	(Germany) Hopp 96.46	6
(England) Edhouse 79.83	4
11	(England) Cullen 84.15	6
(England) R. Smith 85.97	4
14	(Australia) Whitlock 93.33	6

Quarter-finals (best of 11 legs); 22 April
1	(Netherlands) van Gerwen 91.92	6
(England) Evetts 96.62	5
5	(England) Cross 105.28	6
4	(Austria) Suljović 96.60	5
(Czech Republic) Sedláček 89.70	5
10	(Germany) Hopp 91.34	6
11	(England) Cullen 87.16	1
14	(Australia) Whitlock 92.36	6

Semi-finals (best of 13 legs); 22 April
1	(Netherlands) van Gerwen 93.81	7
5	(England) Cross 89.23	1
10	(Germany) Hopp 92.51	6
14	(Australia) Whitlock 90.50	7

Final (best of 15 legs); 22 April
1	(Netherlands) van Gerwen 106.45	8
14	(Australia) Whitlock 94.38	3
