= 2018 Austrian Darts Open =

Professional darts tournament

Tournament information
- Dates: 20–22 April 2018
- Venue: Premstättner Halle
- Location: Graz, Austria
- Organisation(s): PDC
- Format: Legs
- Prize fund: £135,000
- Winner's share: £25,000
- High checkout: 160 (Netherlands) Ron Meulenkamp (Germany) Kevin Münch (first round)

Champion(s)
- (Wales) Jonny Clayton

The 2018 Austrian Darts Open was the fourth out of thirteen PDC European Tour events on the 2018 PDC Pro Tour. The tournament took place at Premstättner Halle in Graz, Austria, between 20 and 22 April 2018. It featured a field of 48 players and £135,000 in prize money, with £25,000 going to the winner.

Michael van Gerwen was the defending champion after defeating Michael Smith 6–5 in the final of the 2017 tournament, although he withdrew prior to the tournament beginning.

Jonny Clayton (who became a seeded player following van Gerwen's withdrawal) defeated fellow Welshman Gerwyn Price 8–5, in what was both their first PDC European Tour final, and which was the second European Tour in a row where a debutant finalist won the event (following on from Max Hopp in the 2018 German Darts Open the previous week).

== Prize money ==
This is how the prize money is divided:

Stage (num. of players)		Prize money
Winner	(1)	£25,000
Runner-up	(1)	£10,000
Semi-finalists	(2)	£6,000
Quarter-finalists	(4)	£4,000
Third round losers	(8)	£3,000
Second round losers	(16)	£2,000
First round losers	(16)	£1,000
Total	£135,000	

Prize money will count towards the PDC Order of Merit, the ProTour Order of Merit and the European Tour Order of Merit, with one exception: should a seeded player lose in the second round (last 32), their prize money will not count towards any Orders of Merit, although they still receive the full prize money payment.

== Qualification and format ==
The top 16 entrants from the PDC ProTour Order of Merit on 27 February will automatically qualify for the event and will be seeded in the second round.

The remaining 32 places will go to players from five qualifying events – 18 from the UK Qualifier (held in Barnsley on 9 March), eight from the West/South European Qualifier (held on 12 April), four from the Host Nation Qualifier (held on 19 April), one from the Nordic & Baltic Qualifier (held on 23 February) and one from the East European Qualifier (held on 28 January).

Michael van Gerwen, who would have been the number 1 seed, withdrew from the tournament prior to the draw. Jonny Clayton, the highest-ranked qualifier, was promoted to 16th seed, with an extra place being made available in the Host Nation Qualifier.

Dave Chisnall withdrew with injury on the day of the tournament, so Wayne Jones, who was due to face him in round 2, was given a bye to round 3.

The following players will take part in the tournament:

Top 16
1. (Scotland) Peter Wright (second round)
2. (England) Rob Cross (quarter-finals)
3. (England) Michael Smith (quarter-finals)
4. (Northern Ireland) Daryl Gurney (quarter-finals)
5. (Austria) Mensur Suljović (semi-finals)
6. (England) Joe Cullen (semi-finals)
7. (England) ~~Dave Chisnall (withdrew)~~
8. (England) Ian White (quarter-finals)
9. (Australia) Simon Whitlock (third round)
10. (Wales) Gerwyn Price (runner-up)
11. (England) Mervyn King (third round)
12. (Netherlands) Jelle Klaasen (second round)
13. (England) Darren Webster (third round)
14. (Netherlands) Benito van de Pas (second round)
15. (England) Steve Beaton (third round)
16. (Wales) Jonny Clayton (champion)

UK Qualifier
- (Scotland) Cameron Menzies (first round)
- (Scotland) John Henderson (first round)
- (England) Stephen Burton (first round)
- (England) Luke Humphries (second round)
- (Northern Ireland) Brendan Dolan (second round)
- (England) James Wade (third round)
- (England) Michael Barnard (second round)
- (England) Alan Tabern (first round)
- (Republic of Ireland) Jason Cullen (second round)
- (England) Steve West (second round)
- (England) Wayne Jones (third round)
- (England) Simon Stevenson (first round)
- (Wales) Richie Burnett (second round)
- (Republic of Ireland) Steve Lennon (second round)
- (England) Ritchie Edhouse (first round)
- (England) Adam Hunt (second round)
- (England) Scott Taylor (second round)

West/South European Qualifier
- (Spain) Cristo Reyes (third round)
- (Netherlands) Ron Meulenkamp (second round)
- (Germany) Max Hopp (second round)
- (Germany) Simeon Heinz (first round)
- (Germany) Kevin Münch (first round)
- (Germany) Gabriel Clemens (first round)
- (Belgium) Dimitri Van den Bergh (third round)
- (Belgium) Ronny Huybrechts (first round)

Host Nation Qualifier
- (Austria) Bastian Pietschnig (first round)
- (Austria) Hannes Schnier (first round)
- (Austria) Dietmar Burger (first round)
- (Austria) Roxy-James Rodriguez (first round)
- (Austria) Alex Steinbauer (first round)

Nordic & Baltic Qualifier
- (Lithuania) Darius Labanauskas (second round)

East European Qualifier
- (Hungary) Tamás Alexits (first round)

== Draw ==
First round (best of 11 legs); 20 April
(England) James Wade 97.09	6
(Austria) Hannes Schnier 85.79	3
(Germany) Max Hopp 90.96	6
(England) Stephen Burton 86.89	5
(Northern Ireland) Brendan Dolan 92.88	6
(England) Alan Tabern 88.77	4
(England) Adam Hunt 86.95	6
(Scotland) Cameron Menzies 91.72	5
(England) Ritchie Edhouse 88.16	3
(Lithuania) Darius Labanauskas 92.01	6
(Spain) Cristo Reyes 86.85	6
(Austria) Bastian Pietschnig 70.44	1
(Netherlands) Ron Meulenkamp 92.08	6
(Germany) Gabriel Clemens 89.45	3
(Wales) Richie Burnett 93.94	6
(Austria) Alex Steinbauer 76.40	0
(England) Steve West 101.88	6
(Belgium) Ronny Huybrechts 93.20	3
(England) Luke Humphries 99.53	6
(Germany) Kevin Münch 89.37	2
(England) Wayne Jones 81.57	6
(Austria) Dietmar Burger 77.68	1
(England) Scott Taylor 91.57	6
(Germany) Simeon Heinz 70.65	1
(Republic of Ireland) Steve Lennon 81.24	6
(Austria) Roxy-James Rodriguez 66.31	0
(Republic of Ireland) Jason Cullen 91.02	6
(Hungary) Tamás Alexits 79.63	1
(Scotland) John Henderson 85.37	1
(England) Michael Barnard 87.45	6
(Belgium) Dimitri Van den Bergh 106.42	6
(England) Simon Stevenson 95.56	4

Second round (best of 11 legs); 21 April
1	(Scotland) Peter Wright 101.51	4
(England) James Wade 102.81	6
16	(Wales) Jonny Clayton 90.02	6
(Germany) Max Hopp 89.84	3
8	(England) Ian White 98.22	6
(Northern Ireland) Brendan Dolan 89.01	4
9	(Australia) Simon Whitlock 83.84	6
(England) Adam Hunt 84.14	4
5	(Austria) Mensur Suljović 106.29	6
(Lithuania) Darius Labanauskas 95.76	1
12	(Netherlands) Jelle Klaasen 88.60	2
(Spain) Cristo Reyes 91.15	6
4	(Northern Ireland) Daryl Gurney 90.67	6
(Netherlands) Ron Meulenkamp 86.69	3
13	(England) Darren Webster 92.57	6
(Wales) Richie Burnett 85.95	5
2	(England) Rob Cross 94.95	6
(England) Steve West 90.25	5
15	(England) Steve Beaton 91.29	6
(England) Luke Humphries 91.46	5
7	(England) Dave Chisnall	w/d
(England) Wayne Jones	w/o
10	(Wales) Gerwyn Price 101.36	6
(England) Scott Taylor 88.51	2
6	(England) Joe Cullen 96.37	6
(Republic of Ireland) Steve Lennon 88.07	2
11	(England) Mervyn King 94.93	6
(Republic of Ireland) Jason Cullen 79.77	0
3	(England) Michael Smith 104.86	6
(England) Michael Barnard 80.57	0
14	(Netherlands) Benito van de Pas 83.36	4
(Belgium) Dimitri Van den Bergh 93.43	6

Third round (best of 11 legs); 22 April
(England) Wade 93.30	3
16	(Wales) Clayton 105.32	6
8	(England) White 90.22	6
9	(Australia) Whitlock 96.16	3
5	(Austria) Suljović 91.44	6
(Spain) Reyes 94.84	3
4	(Northern Ireland) Gurney 95.01	6
13	(England) Webster 97.06	3
2	(England) Cross 95.70	6
15	(England) Beaton 90.09	5
(England) Jones 89.48	3
10	(Wales) Price 90.76	6
6	(England) Cullen 89.86	6
11	(England) King 88.86	3
3	(England) Smith 99.13	6
(Belgium) Van den Bergh 83.28	2

Quarter-finals (best of 11 legs); 22 April
16	(Wales) Clayton 86.91	6
8	(England) White 88.26	4
5	(Austria) Suljović 103.90	6
4	(Northern Ireland) Gurney 95.37	1
2	(England) Cross 87.09	3
10	(Wales) Price 100.98	6
6	(England) Cullen 98.07	6
3	(England) Smith 90.59	2

Semi-finals (best of 13 legs); 22 April
16	(Wales) Clayton 86.66	7
5	(Austria) Suljović 84.24	6
10	(Wales) Price 85.56	7
6	(England) Cullen 87.27	6

Final (best of 15 legs); 22 April
16	(Wales) Clayton 96.80	8
10	(Wales) Price 94.84	5
