= 2015 UK Open =

2015 Coral UK Open

Tournament information
- Dates: 6–8 March 2015
- Venue: Butlin's Minehead
- Location: Minehead, England
- Organisation(s): Professional Darts Corporation (PDC)
- Format: Legs; Final – best of 21
- Prize fund: £300,000
- Winner's share: £60,000
- High checkout: 170; Kim Huybrechts; Michael van Gerwen

Champion(s)
- (Netherlands) Michael van Gerwen

The 2015 Coral UK Open was a darts tournament staged by the Professional Darts Corporation. It was the thirteenth year of the tournament where, following numerous regional qualifying heats throughout Britain, players competing in a single elimination tournament to be crowned champion. The tournament was held for the second time at the Butlin's Resort in Minehead, England, from 6 to 8 March 2015, and had the nickname, "the FA Cup of darts" as a random draw was staged after each round until the final.

Adrian Lewis was the defending champion, having won the fourth major title of his career after beating Terry Jenkins 11–1 in the 2014 final. This year however, he was defeated in the third round after losing 9–3 to Raymond van Barneveld. Michael van Gerwen won his first UK Open title by defeating Peter Wright 11–5 in the final.

== Format and qualifiers ==
=== UK Open qualifiers ===
There were six qualifying events staged in February 2015 to determine the UK Open Order of Merit Table. The tournament winners were:

| No. | Date | Venue | Winner | Score | Runner-up | Ref. |
|---|---|---|---|---|---|---|
| 1 | Friday 6 February | Robin Park Tennis Centre, Wigan | Adrian Lewis (England) | 6–1 | (Netherlands) Michael van Gerwen | |
| 2 | Saturday 7 February | Robin Park Tennis Centre, Wigan | Michael van Gerwen (Netherlands) | 6–1 | (Netherlands) Vincent van der Voort | |
| 3 | Sunday 8 February | Robin Park Tennis Centre, Wigan | Michael van Gerwen (Netherlands) | 6–1 | (England) James Wade | |
| 4 | Friday 20 February | Robin Park Tennis Centre, Wigan | Michael van Gerwen (Netherlands) | 6–5 | (Netherlands) Jelle Klaasen | |
| 5 | Saturday 21 February | Robin Park Tennis Centre, Wigan | Michael Smith (England) | 6–5 | (England) Adrian Lewis | |
| 6 | Sunday 22 February | Robin Park Tennis Centre, Wigan | Phil Taylor (England) | 6–2 | (England) Ian White | |

The tournament featured 147 players. The results of the six qualifiers shown above were collated into the UK Open Order Of Merit. The top 32 players in the Order of Merit received a place at the final tournament. In addition, the next 64 players plus ties in the Order of Merit list qualified for the tournament, but started in the earlier rounds played on the Friday. A further 32 players qualified via regional qualifying tournaments.

=== Top 32 in Order of Merit (receiving byes into third round) ===
1. (Netherlands) Michael van Gerwen
2. (England) Adrian Lewis
3. (England) Michael Smith
4. (England) Phil Taylor
5. (Netherlands) Vincent van der Voort
6. (England) James Wade
7. (Netherlands) Jelle Klaasen
8. (England) Ian White
9. (Wales) Mark Webster
10. (Belgium) Kim Huybrechts
11. (England) Andrew Gilding
12. (Northern Ireland) Brendan Dolan
13. (England) Dave Chisnall
14. (Netherlands) Raymond van Barneveld
15. (Scotland) Robert Thornton
16. (England) Justin Pipe
17. (Scotland) Peter Wright
18. (Austria) Mensur Suljović
19. (England) Jamie Caven
20. (Australia) Paul Nicholson
21. (England) Alan Norris
22. (England) Eddie Dootson
23. (England) Mervyn King
24. (Northern Ireland) Daryl Gurney
25. (England) Brian Woods
26. (England) Terry Jenkins
27. (England) Andy Hamilton
28. (Scotland) John Henderson
29. (England) Steve Beaton
30. (Australia) Simon Whitlock
31. (Scotland) Gary Anderson
32. (Germany) Max Hopp

=== Number 33–64 of the Order of Merit (receiving byes into second round) ===
33. (England) Ricky Evans
34. (England) James Wilson
35. (England) Joe Murnan
36. (Australia) Kyle Anderson
37. (England) Andy Smith
38. (England) Matthew Edgar
39. (Netherlands) Jeffrey de Zwaan
40. (England) Kevin Painter
41. (England) Stephen Bunting
42. (England) Andy Boulton
43. (England) Dean Winstanley
44. (England) Joe Cullen
45. (Belgium) Ronny Huybrechts
46. (Republic of Ireland) William O'Connor
47. (England) Chris Dobey
48. (Netherlands) Christian Kist
49. (England) Kevin McDine
50. (England) Wayne Jones
51. (England) Nathan Aspinall
52. (Netherlands) Jan Dekker
53. (England) Nathan Derry
54. (England) Ronnie Baxter
55. (England) Mark Frost
56. (England) Ryan Harrington
57. (England) Dennis Smith
58. (Netherlands) Benito van de Pas
59. (England) Darren Webster
60. (England) Terry Temple
61. (England) Andy Jenkins
62. (England) Dean Stewart
63. (Scotland) Jamie Bain
64. (England) Aaron Turner

=== Remaining Order of Merit qualifiers (starting in first and preliminary round) ===
65. (England) Stuart Kellett
66. (Netherlands) Dirk van Duijvenbode
67. (Wales) Jonny Clayton
68. (England) Steve Hine
69. (England) Alan Tabern
70. (England) John Bowles
71. (England) Darren Johnson
72. (England) Jay Foreman
73. (England) Johnny Haines
74. (England) Shaun Griffiths
75. (England) Mark Jones
76. (England) Josh Payne
77. (England) Wes Newton
78. (England) Brett Claydon
79. (England) Keegan Brown
80. (England) Adam Hunt
81. (Belgium) Mike De Decker
82. (England) David Pallett
83. (Netherlands) Joey ten Berge
84. (South Africa) Devon Petersen
85. (England) Lee Evans
86. (England) Colin Fowler
87. (Netherlands) Mike Zuydwijk
88. (England) James Richardson
89. (England) Mark Cox
90. (Canada) John Part
91. (England) Matt Clark
92. (England) Ricky Sudale
93. (England) Nick Fullwell
94. (England) Jon Jukes
95. (England) Luke Woodhouse
96. (England) Steve Douglas
97. (England) Jason Wilson
98. (England) Robbie Green
99. (England) Ben Ward
100. (England) Alex Roy
101. (England) Jason Lovett
102. (England) Mick Todd
103. (England) Steve West
104. (England) Matt Padgett
105. (England) Mark Dudbridge
106. (England) Ian Moss
107. (Netherlands) Jermaine Wattimena
108. (England) Dave Ladley
109. (England) Martyn Turner
110. (England) Jamie Robinson
111. (England) Mark Robinson
112. (Scotland) Mark Barilli
113. (Republic of Ireland) Connie Finnan
114. (Wales) Gerwyn Price
115. (England) Scott Dale

=== Riley qualifiers (starting in first and preliminary round) ===
32 amateur players qualified from Riley qualifiers held across the UK.

- (England) Tommy Sanwell
- (England) Dean Sanders
- (England) Peter Hudson
- (England) Stuart White
- (England) Bradley Williams
- (England) Dave Parletti
- (England) Paul Dawkins
- (England) Chris Packer
- (England) Kevin Edwards
- (England) John Ferrell
- (England) Rob Smith
- (England) Kevin Smith
- (England) Rory Duffy
- (England) Lloyd Pennell
- (England) Adi Acott
- (England) Jason Mold
- (England) Dave Prins
- (England) Matthew Tedstone
- (England) Mick Brooks
- (Scotland) Jim McEwan
- (England) Lee Russell
- (England) Lionel Sams
- (England) Graham Hall
- (Scotland) Derek Brand
- (Wales) Mark Layton
- (England) Gary O'Donnell
- (England) Stephen Hardy
- (England) Arron Fairweather
- (England) Nigel Daniels
- (England) Paul Hogan
- (England) Adam Huckvale
- (England) Simon Stevenson

== Prize money ==
The prize fund was increased from £250,000 to £300,000 for this year's event.

| Stage (no. of players) | | Prize money (Total: £300,000) |
|---|---|---|
| Winner | (1) | £60,000 |
| Runner-Up | (1) | £30,000 |
| Semi-finalists | (2) | £17,000 |
| Quarter-finalists | (4) | £10,000 |
| Last 16 (fifth round) | (8) | £5,000 |
| Last 32 (fourth round) | (16) | £3,000 |
| Last 64 (third round) | (32) | £1,500 |
| Last 96 (second round) | (32) | n/a |
| Last 128 (first round) | (32) | n/a |
| Last 147 (preliminary round) | (19) | n/a |

== Draw ==
=== Friday 6 March ===
==== Preliminary round (best of nine legs) ====
| Player | Score | Player | Player | Score | Player |
|---|---|---|---|---|---|
| (England) Jamie Robinson | 5–1 | (England) Chris Packer (Q) | (Republic of Ireland) Connie Finnan | 5–4 | (Scotland) Jim McEwan (Q) |
| (Wales) Mark Layton (Q) | 5–2 | (England) Tommy Sanwell (Q) | (England) Stuart White (Q) | 5–4 | (England) Matthew Tedstone (Q) |
| (England) Dave Ladley | 5–1 | (England) Kevin Edwards (Q) | (England) Rory Duffy (Q) | 2–5 | (England) Adam Huckvale (Q) |
| (England) Stephen Hardy (Q) | 5–3 | (England) Dean Sanders (Q) | (England) Robbie Green | 5–1 | (England) Graham Hall (Q) |
| (England) Ian Moss | 5–1 | (England) Adi Acott (Q) | (England) Matt Padgett | 5–2 | (Wales) Gerwyn Price |
| (England) Dave Parletti (Q) | 5–2 | (England) Bradley Williams (Q) | (England) Scott Dale | 4–5 | (England) Nigel Daniels (Q) |
| (England) Paul Hogan (Q) | 5–1 | (England) Lee Russell (Q) | (England) Ben Ward | 5–2 | (England) Jason Lovett |
| (England) Mick Todd | 5–1 | (England) Kevin Smith (Q) | (England) Mark Dudbridge | 5–1 | (England) Lloyd Pennel (Q) |
| (England) John Ferrell (Q) | 5–3 | (England) Paul Dawkins (Q) | (England) Steve Douglas | 5–3 | (England) Mark Robinson |
| (England) Dave Prins (Q) | 5–2 | (England) Simon Stevenson (Q) | | | |

==== First round (best of nine legs) ====
| Player | Score | Player | Player | Score | Player |
|---|---|---|---|---|---|
| (Republic of Ireland) Connie Finnan | 3–5 | (England) Ian Moss | (England) Luke Woodhouse | 3–5 | (England) Dave Prins (Q) |
| (England) Dave Parletti (Q) | 1–5 | (England) Arron Fairweather (Q) | (England) John Bowles | 2–5 | (England) Steve Douglas |
| (Belgium) Mike De Decker | 5–1 | (England) Stephen Hardy (Q) | (England) Darren Johnson | 5–0 | (England) Ricky Sudale |
| (England) Keegan Brown | 5–3 | (England) Mick Brookes (Q) | (England) Brett Claydon | 1–5 | (Netherlands) Joey ten Berge |
| (England) Matt Padgett | 5–3 | (England) Stuart White (Q) | (England) Mick Todd | 0–5 | (England) Nigel Daniels (Q) |
| (England) Jamie Robinson | 4–5 | (England) Jason Mold (Q) | (England) Wes Newton | 5–2 | (England) Martyn Turner |
| (England) Gary O'Donnell (Q) | 2–5 | (England) Adam Huckvale (Q) | (England) Steve Hine | 2–5 | (Scotland) Mark Barilli |
| (South Africa) Devon Petersen | 5–1 | (England) Matt Clark | (England) Alan Tabern | 5–4 | (England) Adam Hunt |
| (England) Stuart Kellett | 5–0 | (England) Robbie Green | (England) David Pallett | 5–2 | (England) Mark Dudbridge |
| (England) Mark Cox | 5–1 | (England) Ben Ward | (Netherlands) Dirk van Duijvenbode | 3–5 | (Wales) Mark Layton (Q) |
| (Netherlands) Mike Zuydwijk | 5–2 | (Canada) John Part | (England) Mark Jones | 3–5 | (England) Jason Wilson |
| (England) Lee Evans | 5–2 | (England) Nick Fullwell | (England) Colin Fowler | 5–0 | (England) Steve West |
| (England) Shaun Griffiths | 2–5 | (England) Jon Jukes | (England) Jay Foreman | 5–1 | (England) Dave Ladley |
| (England) Johnny Haines | 4–5 | (England) James Richardson | (England) Alex Roy | 1–5 | (England) John Ferrell (Q) |
| (England) Josh Payne | 5–3 | (England) Lionel Sams (Q) | (England) Paul Hogan (Q) | 5–3 | (Scotland) Derek Brand (Q) |
| (Wales) Jonny Clayton | 1–5 | (Netherlands) Jermaine Wattimena | (England) Peter Hudson (Q) | 4–5 | (England) Rob Smith (Q) |

==== Second round (best of nine legs) ====
| Player | Score | Player | Player | Score | Player |
|---|---|---|---|---|---|
| (Netherlands) Christian Kist | 5–3 | (England) Ian Moss | (England) James Wilson | 5–0 | (England) Mark Frost |
| (England) Chris Dobey | 1–5 | (England) Nathan Aspinall | (England) Andy Boulton | 4–5 | (England) Steve Douglas |
| (Netherlands) Jan Dekker | 5–3 | (Belgium) Mike De Decker | (England) Darren Johnson | 3–5 | (England) Paul Hogan (Q) |
| (England) Dean Winstanley 96.33 | 3–5 | (Republic of Ireland) William O'Connor 87.86 | (England) Wayne Jones | 2–5 | (Netherlands) Joey ten Berge |
| (England) Ryan Harrington 83.50 | 5–0 | (England) Matt Padgett 65.00 | (England) Andy Jenkins | 5–0 | (England) Nigel Daniels (Q) |
| (England) Matthew Edgar | 4–5 | (England) Jason Mold (Q) | (England) Wes Newton | 5–3 | (England) Jon Jukes |
| (England) Stephen Bunting | 5–2 | (England) Adam Huckvale (Q) | (England) Dennis Smith | 1–5 | (Scotland) Mark Barilli |
| (England) Kevin Painter | 5–2 | (Scotland) Jamie Bain | (England) Nathan Derry | 5–4 | (England) Alan Tabern |
| (England) Joe Murnan | 5–1 | (England) Stuart Kellett | (England) Andy Smith | 4–5 | (England) David Pallett |
| (South Africa) Devon Petersen | 5–4 | (England) Mark Cox | (England) Ricky Evans | 5–3 | (Wales) Mark Layton (Q) |
| (Netherlands) Mike Zuydwijk | 3–5 | (England) Keegan Brown | (England) Ronnie Baxter | 5–2 | (England) Arron Fairweather (Q) |
| (Belgium) Ronny Huybrechts | 3–5 | (England) Lee Evans | (England) Colin Fowler | 5–3 | (England) Jason Wilson |
| (Netherlands) Jeffrey de Zwaan | 2–5 | (Netherlands) Benito van de Pas | (England) Aaron Turner | 5–4 | (England) Jay Foreman |
| (England) Dean Stewart | 1–5 | (England) James Richardson | (England) Darren Webster | 2–5 | (England) John Ferrell (Q) |
| (England) Josh Payne 94.58 | 5–4 | (England) Dave Prins (Q) 86.61 | (Australia) Kyle Anderson | 5–4 | (England) Terry Temple |
| (England) Kevin McDine | 5–4 | (Netherlands) Jermaine Wattimena | (England) Joe Cullen | 5–1 | (England) Rob Smith (Q) |

==== Third round (best of seventeen legs) ====
| Player | Score | Player | Player | Score | Player |
|---|---|---|---|---|---|
| (England) Adrian Lewis 98.80 | 3–9 | (Netherlands) Raymond van Barneveld 99.80 | (Scotland) Peter Wright 101.34 | 9–5 | (England) Steve Beaton 94.06 |
| (Netherlands) Benito van de Pas 91.64 | 5–9 | (England) Paul Hogan (Q) 92.90 | (Scotland) John Henderson 94.58 | 9–7 | (England) Steve Douglas 93.17 |
| (Austria) Mensur Suljović | 9–1 | (Netherlands) Joey ten Berge | (England) Andrew Gilding | 9–0 | (England) Kevin Painter |
| (England) Eddie Dootson | 9–6 | (England) Joe Cullen | (South Africa) Devon Petersen | 9–4 | (Scotland) Mark Barilli |
| (England) Phil Taylor 103.16 | 9–2 | (England) John Ferrell (Q) 89.59 | (Scotland) Robert Thornton 96.03 | 9–5 | (Australia) Simon Whitlock 93.19 |
| (England) David Pallett 86.23 | 9–4 | (England) Colin Fowler 86.27 | (England) Nathan Aspinall 80.87 | 9–4 | (England) James Richardson 75.61 |
| (England) Ricky Evans | 4–9 | (England) James Wilson | (England) Brian Woods | 2–9 | (England) Ronnie Baxter |
| (England) Justin Pipe | 5–9 | (Netherlands) Jan Dekker | (England) Wes Newton | 9–0 | (England) Jason Mold (Q) |
| (England) Mervyn King 91.69 | 9–8 | (Scotland) Gary Anderson 90.92 | (England) Michael Smith | 8–9 | (England) Stephen Bunting |
| (Netherlands) Vincent van der Voort 93.06 | 9–4 | (England) Lee Evans 91.27 | (England) Nathan Derry 85.64 | 9–2 | (England) Keegan Brown 75.70 |
| (England) Andy Jenkins | 6–9 | (England) Josh Payne | (England) Andy Hamilton | 9–8 | (England) Aaron Turner |
| (Wales) Mark Webster | 5–9 | (Republic of Ireland) William O'Connor | (England) Dave Chisnall | 9–6 | (England) Ryan Harrington |
| (Netherlands) Michael van Gerwen 90.34 | 9–3 | (Australia) Paul Nicholson 80.03 | (Belgium) Kim Huybrechts 97.33 | 9–7 | (Germany) Max Hopp 91.10 |
| (Netherlands) Jelle Klaasen 94.00 | 9–4 | (Northern Ireland) Brendan Dolan 90.34 | (England) James Wade 90.24 | 9–3 | (England) Joe Murnan 84.32 |
| (England) Alan Norris | 6–9 | (Australia) Kyle Anderson | (England) Jamie Caven | 9–3 | (England) Terry Jenkins |
| (England) Ian White | 9–8 | (Netherlands) Christian Kist | (Northern Ireland) Daryl Gurney | 9–1 | (England) Kevin McDine |

=== Saturday 7 March ===
==== Fourth round (best of seventeen legs) ====
| Player | Score | Player | Player | Score | Player |
|---|---|---|---|---|---|
| (England) Jamie Caven 84.74 | 6–9 | (South Africa) Devon Petersen 88.67 | (Scotland) Robert Thornton 88.97 | 8–9 | (England) Eddie Dootson 87.05 |
| (Netherlands) Raymond van Barneveld 85.43 | 1–9 | (Scotland) Peter Wright 100.55 | (England) James Wilson 91.63 | 7–9 | (Australia) Kyle Anderson 87.73 |
| (Austria) Mensur Suljović 92.93 | 9–4 | (England) Josh Payne 90.02 | (Netherlands) Jan Dekker 90.79 | 9–4 | (England) Ronnie Baxter 86.48 |
| (England) Ian White 93.35 | 6–9 | (Republic of Ireland) William O'Connor 95.12 | (Netherlands) Vincent van der Voort 94.49 | 9–4 | (England) Wes Newton 86.55 |
| (England) Phil Taylor 107.27 | 9–3 | (England) David Pallett 95.65 | (England) James Wade 94.78 | 9–4 | (England) Nathan Aspinall 85.23 |
| (England) Dave Chisnall 100.40 | 6–9 | (England) Stephen Bunting 99.37 | (England) Mervyn King 92.86 | 9–8 | (England) Nathan Derry 91.74 |
| (Netherlands) Michael van Gerwen 102.29 | 9–4 | (England) Paul Hogan (Q) 101.20 | (Netherlands) Jelle Klaasen 92.53 | 5–9 | (England) Andrew Gilding 100.86 |
| (Belgium) Kim Huybrechts 90.44 | 9–8 | (England) Andy Hamilton 86.94 | (Northern Ireland) Daryl Gurney 99.27 | 8–9 | (Scotland) John Henderson 95.74 |

==== Fifth round (best of seventeen legs) ====
| Player | Score | Player |
|---|---|---|
| (England) Mervyn King 94.47 | 9–8 | (Australia) Kyle Anderson 95.69 |
| (Netherlands) Michael van Gerwen 114.91 | 9–2 | (Belgium) Kim Huybrechts 101.59 |
| (England) Eddie Dootson 78.30 | 5–9 | (South Africa) Devon Petersen 91.04 |
| (England) Phil Taylor 111.67 | 9–3 | (Netherlands) Vincent van der Voort 101.03 |
| (Austria) Mensur Suljović 90.13 | 9–7 | (Netherlands) Jan Dekker 88.85 |
| (England) Stephen Bunting 96.08 | 9–6 | (Republic of Ireland) William O'Connor 93.43 |
| (Scotland) Peter Wright 99.71 | 9–2 | (Scotland) John Henderson 91.38 |
| (England) James Wade 92.38 | 6–9 | (England) Andrew Gilding 94.55 |

=== Sunday 8 March ===
==== Quarter-finals (best of nineteen legs) ====
| Player | Score | Player |
|---|---|---|
| (England) Mervyn King 94.53 | 6–10 | (England) Stephen Bunting 93.22 |
| (Netherlands) Michael van Gerwen 106.65 | 10–5 | (South Africa) Devon Petersen 98.14 |
| (England) Andrew Gilding 99.44 | 10–8 | (Austria) Mensur Suljović 94.87 |
| (England) Phil Taylor 108.57 | 6–10 | (Scotland) Peter Wright 102.99 |

==== Semi-finals and Final ====
Semi-finals (best of 19 legs)
(Scotland) Peter Wright 105.10 | 10
(England) Stephen Bunting 82.39 | 0
(Netherlands) Michael van Gerwen 105.56 | 10
(England) Andrew Gilding 108.37 | 8

Final (best of 21 legs)
(Scotland) Peter Wright 99.33 | 5
(Netherlands) Michael van Gerwen 98.43 | 11

== Media coverage ==
Like the 2014 tournament, the 2015 tournament was broadcast live in the UK on ITV4 and ITV4 HD.
