= 2018 UK Open =

2018 Coral UK Open

Tournament information
- Dates: 2–4 March 2018
- Venue: Butlin's Minehead
- Location: Minehead, England
- Organisation(s): Professional Darts Corporation (PDC)
- Format: Legs; Final – best of 21
- Prize fund: £350,000
- Winner's share: £70,000
- High checkout: 170; Michael Rasztovits; Daryl Gurney; Steve West

Champion(s)
- (Scotland) Gary Anderson

The 2018 Coral UK Open was a darts tournament staged by the Professional Darts Corporation. It was the sixteenth year of the tournament where, following numerous regional qualifying heats throughout Britain, players competed in a single elimination tournament to be crowned champion. The tournament was held for the fifth time at the Butlin's Resort in Minehead, England, between 2 to 4 March 2018, and has the nickname, "the FA Cup of darts" as a random draw was staged after each round until the final.

Peter Wright was the defending champion after defeating Gerwyn Price 11–6 in the 2017 final, but he lost in the third round to Nathan Rafferty.

Gary Anderson became the UK Open champion for the first time, defeating Corey Cadby (who was making his debut in the event) 11–7 in the final.

Michael van Gerwen's defeat to Jeffrey de Zwaan in the third round was the first time van Gerwen had lost a live match on ITV since the 2014 Players Championship Finals. Van Gerwen was unbeaten for 77 live matches (including the two live World Series events) on the channel during that period.

The tournament was severely affected by the extreme weather conditions caused by Storm Emma, which had forced the complete cancellation of round five of the 2018 Premier League Darts that had been due to be held in Exeter the evening before the tournament started. Eleven players who were due to play in the first, second and third rounds withdrew from the competition, and on 2 March, the unprecedented decision was taken by Butlin's to not allow any fans apart from the players' relatives, guests and friends into the venue, resulting in the whole tournament being played behind closed doors.

The tournament was still televised live on ITV4, but the Butlin's Skyline Pavilion Arena was unable to be used for the allocated Main Stage TV matches due to heavy snow and ice, so these matches were reallocated to the secondary Red's Bar stage.

== Format and qualifiers ==
=== UK Open qualifiers ===
There were six qualifying events staged in February 2018 to determine the UK Open Order of Merit Table. The tournament winners were:

No.	Date	Venue	Winner	Score	Runner-up	Ref.
1	Friday 2 February	Robin Park Tennis Centre, Wigan	Michael van Gerwen	6 – 3	Michael Smith	
2	Saturday 3 February	Robin Park Tennis Centre, Wigan	Michael van Gerwen	6 – 3	Darren Webster	
3	Sunday 4 February	Robin Park Tennis Centre, Wigan	Michael Smith	6 – 0	Zoran Lerchbacher	
4	Friday 9 February	Robin Park Tennis Centre, Wigan	Gary Anderson	6 – 2	Jeffrey de Zwaan	
5	Saturday 10 February	Robin Park Tennis Centre, Wigan	Corey Cadby	6 – 4	Rob Cross	
6	Sunday 11 February	Robin Park Tennis Centre, Wigan	Krzysztof Ratajski	6 – 4	Daryl Gurney	

The tournament featured 128 players. The results of the six qualifiers shown above were collated into the UK Open Order Of Merit. The top 32 players in the Order of Merit received byes into the third round of the UK Open. Players ranked 33–64 received byes to the second round, while Players ranked 65–96 entered the main tournament in the first round. A further 32 players qualified via regional qualifying tournaments.

=== Top 32 in Order of Merit (receiving byes into third round) ===
1. (Netherlands) Michael van Gerwen
2. (England) Michael Smith
3. (Poland) Krzysztof Ratajski
4. (Australia) Corey Cadby
5. (England) Rob Cross
6. (Scotland) Gary Anderson
7. (Scotland) Peter Wright
8. (Northern Ireland) Daryl Gurney
9. (Belgium) Kim Huybrechts
10. (Netherlands) Jeffrey de Zwaan
11. (England) Darren Webster
12. (England) Mervyn King
13. (Austria) ~~Zoran Lerchbacher~~*
14. (Scotland) John Henderson
15. (England) Steve Beaton
16. (England) Adrian Lewis
17. (England) Steve West
18. (Wales) Jamie Lewis
19. (England) David Pallett
20. (England) James Wade
21. (England) Justin Pipe
22. (Netherlands) Jelle Klaasen
23. (England) Matthew Edgar
24. (Wales) Jonny Clayton
25. (England) Jamie Hughes
26. (England) Simon Stevenson
27. (Australia) Simon Whitlock
28. (England) Dave Prins
29. (Scotland) Robert Thornton
30. (England) Ian White
31. (Germany) Martin Schindler
32. (Australia) Kyle Anderson

=== Number 33–64 of the Order of Merit (receiving byes into second round) ===
33. (Wales) Gerwyn Price
34. (England) James Wilson
35. (Wales) Robert Owen
36. (England) Jason Lowe
37. (England) Joe Cullen
38. (England) Nathan Aspinall
39. (England) Keegan Brown
40. (England) Alan Norris
41. (Netherlands) Danny Noppert
42. (Northern Ireland) Nathan Rafferty
43. (Netherlands) Vincent van der Voort
44. (Scotland) ~~John Goldie~~*
45. (England) David Evans
46. (England) Richard North
47. (Netherlands) Vincent Kamphuis
48. (Netherlands) Jermaine Wattimena
49. (England) Stephen Bunting
50. (England) Stuart Kellett
51. (Spain) José Justicia
52. (Germany) Gabriel Clemens
53. (England) Wayne Jones
54. (England) Mike Norton
55. (England) Carl Wilkinson
56. (England) Andrew Gilding
57. (Netherlands) Geert Nentjes
58. (Spain) Toni Alcinas
59. (England) Dave Chisnall
60. (Netherlands) Raymond van Barneveld
61. (England) Chris Dobey
62. (England) James Richardson
63. (Germany) ~~Maik Langendorf~~ *
64. (England) Ted Evetts

=== Number 65–96 of the Order of Merit qualifiers (starting in first round) ===
65. (Austria) Michael Rasztovits
66. (Netherlands) Ron Meulenkamp
67. (England) Kirk Shepherd
68. (Wales) Richie Burnett
69. (England) Ricky Evans
70. (England) Mark Walsh
71. (New Zealand) Cody Harris
72. (Republic of Ireland) ~~William O'Connor~~*
73. (England) Terry Jenkins
74. (England) Chris Quantock
75. (England) Michael Barnard
76. (England) Bradley Brooks
77. (Netherlands) Dirk van Duijvenbode
78. (England) Ryan Meikle
79. (Belgium) Dimitri Van den Bergh
80. (Australia) Paul Nicholson
81. (England) Luke Humphries
82. (Spain) Cristo Reyes
83. (Germany) ~~René Berndt~~**
84. (Germany) René Eidams
85. (England) Lee Evans
86. (England) Ryan Harrington
87. (England) Robert Rickwood
88. (Northern Ireland) Mickey Mansell
89. (England) Andy Jenkins
90. (Netherlands) Benito van de Pas
91. (Republic of Ireland) ~~Mick McGowan~~*
92. (England) Darren Johnson
93. (Canada) John Part
94. (India) Prakash Jiwa
95. (England) Adam Hunt
96. (England) George Killington

** René Berndt dropped out of the tournament because of health reasons.

=== Rileys qualifiers (starting in first round) ===
32 amateur players qualified from 28 Rileys Sports Bar qualifiers held across the UK between 20 January and 18 February.

- (Scotland) ~~Andrew Davidson~~* (GRE, 20 January)
- (England) Michael Burgoine (VIC, 21 January)
- (England) Joe Davis (VIC, 21 January)
- (England) Andrew Johnson (CHO, 27 January)
- (England) Jason Mold (NOR, 27 January)
- (England) Tony Mitchell (NOT, 27 January)
- (England) Ian Jopling (TWI, 27 January)
- (England) Mark Craddock (WOL, 27 January)
- (England) Liam Kelly (WOL, 27 January)
- (England) Benjamin McClelland (LEI, 28 January)
- (England) ~~Mark Rice~~* (LIV, 28 January)
- (England) Paul Hogan (SBE, 28 January)
- (England) David Airey (CHE, 3 February)
- (England) Alex Roy (HAR, 3 February)
- (England) ~~Chris Lacey~~* (SHE, 3 February)
- (England) Andy Hamilton (WOR, 3 February)
- (England) ~~Craig Winstanley~~* (CHE, 4 February)
- (England) Harry Ward (COV, 4 February)
- (England) Simon Tate (GRE, 4 February)
- (England) Daniel Lee (SOL, 4 February)
- (England) Martin Atkins (CHO, 10 February)
- (England) Dan Read (TWI, 11 February)
- (Scotland) ~~Scott Robertson~~* (ABE, 17 February)
- (England) Martin Biggs (COV, 17 February)
- (England) Paul Whitworth (LIV, 17 February)
- (England) Darren Brown (NOR, 17 February)
- (England) Andy Hibbert (NOT, 17 February)
- (England) Darryl Pilgrim (VIC, 18 February)
- (England) John Scott (VIC, 18 February)
- (England) Andreas Hajimena (SBE, 18 February)
- (England) John Morris (WOL, 18 February)
- (England) Andrew Pullen (WOL, 18 February)

* Due to Storm Emma, multiple players pulled out of the tournament.

== Prize money ==
The prize fund stayed the same as last year, £350,000.

Stage (no. of players)		Prize money (Total: £350,000)
Winner	(1)	£70,000
Runner-up	(1)	£35,000
Semi-finalists	(2)	£17,500
Quarter-finalists	(4)	£11,500
Last 16 (fifth round)	(8)	£6,500
Last 32 (fourth round)	(16)	£3,500
Last 64 (third round)	(32)	£1,750
Last 96 (second round)	(32)	n/a
Last 128 (first round)	(32)	n/a

== Draw ==
(Note: Due to extreme weather all matches in the tournament were played behind closed doors)

=== Friday 2 March ===
==== First round (best of eleven legs) ====
Player	Score	Player	Player	Score	Player
(Scotland) ~~Andrew Davidson (Q)~~*	w/o	(England) Michael Burgoine (Q)	(England) Darryl Pilgrim (Q) 86.29	6–2	(England) Ian Jopling (Q) 70.81
(Germany) René Eidams 77.58	6–4	(England) Andrew Johnson (Q) 74.98	(England) Benjamin McClelland (Q) 68.35	4–6	(England) David Airey (Q) 78.30
(England) Michael Barnard	w/o	(Scotland) ~~Scott Robertson (Q)~~*	(England) ~~Chris Lacey (Q)~~*	w/o	(England) Martin Biggs (Q)
(Belgium) Dimitri Van den Bergh 87.70	3–6	(England) Lee Evans 88.62	(Wales) Richie Burnett 86.03	5–6	(England) Ryan Harrington 83.52
(England) Dan Read (Q) 73.72	5–6	(England) Joe Davis (Q) 77.26	(England) Ricky Evans 93.40	6–1	(England) Andreas Hajimena (Q) 72.39
(England) Chris Quantock 72.52	4–6	(England) Bradley Brooks 78.67	(Netherlands) Dirk van Duijvenbode	w/o	(Republic of Ireland) ~~Mick McGowan~~*
(England) Terry Jenkins 88.50	5–6	(Australia) Paul Nicholson 83.93	(New Zealand) Cody Harris 94.19	6–1	(England) Tony Mitchell (Q) 88.04
(England) Kirk Shepherd 85.21	6–4	(England) Adam Hunt 82.10	(England) ~~Craig Winstanley (Q)~~*	w/o	(England) Mark Craddock (Q)
(England) Andrew Pullen (Q)	w/o	(England) ~~Mark Rice (Q)~~*	(Republic of Ireland) ~~William O'Connor~~*	w/o	(England) Andy Hamilton (Q)
(Austria) Michael Rasztovits 82.33	6–3	(England) Simon Tate (Q) 78.62	(England) Martin Atkins (Q) 70.94	3–6	(England) Paul Whitworth (Q) 81.20
(England) Luke Humphries 94.93	6–0	(England) Liam Kelly (Q) 63.55	(England) Paul Hogan (Q) 80.18	6–5	(England) Darren Brown (Q) 92.88
(England) Mark Walsh 64.85	2–6	(England) Alex Roy (Q) 78.32	(Spain) Cristo Reyes 92.80	5–6	(Netherlands) Benito van de Pas 87.02
(Germany) ~~René Berndt~~**	w/o	(England) Robert Rickwood	(Netherlands) Ron Meulenkamp 79.56	6–4	(England) Andy Hibbert (Q) 73.75
(England) Harry Ward (Q) 86.71	6–0	(England) Daniel Lee (Q) 71.59	(England) Andy Jenkins 82.85	4–6	(England) George Killington 84.59
(Canada) John Part 82.24	6–2	(England) John Morris (Q) 72.11	(India) Prakash Jiwa 75.08	5–6	(England) Jason Mold (Q) 78.47
(England) Ryan Meikle 74.13	6–5	(Northern Ireland) Mickey Mansell 75.82	(England) Darren Johnson 78.57	4–6	(England) John Scott (Q) 82.48

** René Berndt withdrew from the tournament because of health reasons.

==== Second round (best of eleven legs) ====
Player	Score	Player	Player	Score	Player
(Northern Ireland) Nathan Rafferty 94.56	6–3	(England) Jason Mold (Q) 86.93	(Wales) Gerwyn Price 93.40	6–2	(England) James Wilson 89.44
(Netherlands) Jermaine Wattimena 79.81	6–0	(England) Andy Hamilton (Q) 69.22	(Germany) ~~Maik Langendorf~~*	w/o	(Austria) Michael Rasztovits
(Netherlands) Vincent van der Voort 81.29	6–3	(England) Martin Biggs (Q) 81.99	(Spain) Toni Alcinas 85.38	4–6	(England) Alex Roy (Q) 87.91
(England) Mike Norton 90.13	5–6	(Netherlands) Raymond van Barneveld 94.94	(England) Ryan Meikle 80.05	6–4	(England) Mark Craddock (Q) 73.79
(England) Richard North 78.85	5–6	(Australia) Paul Nicholson 84.22	(England) Keegan Brown 83.83	6–3	(England) George Killington 77.92
(England) Chris Dobey 97.67	6–5	(England) Lee Evans 91.48	(England) Stephen Bunting 82.50	6–2	(England) Bradley Brooks 73.28
(England) Dave Chisnall 96.05	6–2	(Germany) René Eidams 86.95	(Netherlands) Geert Nentjes 79.31	4–6	(England) Darryl Pilgrim (Q) 86.40
(England) Stuart Kellett 78.76	1–6	(England) David Airey (Q) 88.51	(England) Ted Evetts 86.55	1–6	(England) Harry Ward (Q) 90.50
(Netherlands) Danny Noppert 89.89	3–6	(England) Ryan Harrington 87.04	(Netherlands) Ron Meulenkamp 87.55	6–1	(England) Joe Davis (Q) 73.30
(England) Jason Lowe 82.53	6–4	(England) John Scott (Q) 77.72	(New Zealand) Cody Harris 91.55	2–6	(England) Michael Barnard 86.04
(Wales) Robert Owen 87.04	6–4	(England) Michael Burgoine (Q) 83.94	(England) David Evans 81.26	6–4	(Netherlands) Benito van de Pas 84.73
(England) Alan Norris 88.50	4–6	(Netherlands) Dirk van Duijvenbode 92.80	(England) Joe Cullen 90.25	6–2	(Spain) José Justicia 71.93
(Scotland) ~~John Goldie~~*	w/o	(England) Paul Hogan (Q)	(England) Nathan Aspinall 91.81	6–3	(England) Andrew Pullen (Q) 87.50
(Netherlands) Vincent Kamphuis 86.52	3–6	(England) Kirk Shepherd 87.94	(England) Carl Wilkinson 85.72	2–6	(England) Ricky Evans 90.65
(England) James Richardson 66.34	0–6	(England) Robert Rickwood 83.50	(Canada) John Part 71.57	6–0	(England) Paul Whitworth (Q) 53.45
(England) Wayne Jones 79.29	3–6	(England) Luke Humphries 81.41	(Germany) Gabriel Clemens 88.41	6–0	(England) Andrew Gilding 83.70

* Due to extreme weather, multiple players pulled out of the tournament.

==== Third round (best of nineteen legs) ====
Player	Score	Player	Player	Score	Player
(England) Jason Lowe 91.35	10–3	(England) David Airey (Q) 82.52	(England) David Evans 83.82	2–10	(Canada) John Part 92.38
(England) David Pallett 90.00	10–8	(Scotland) Robert Thornton 89.57	(England) Ricky Evans 99.49	10–6	(England) Luke Humphries 94.35
(England) Steve Beaton 86.62	8–10	(Netherlands) Jermaine Wattimena 92.39	(Wales) Jamie Lewis 73.17	2–10	(Wales) Robert Owen 85.60
(Belgium) Kim Huybrechts 86.08	10–8	(Germany) Gabriel Clemens 89.04	(England) Steve West 88.61	10–9	(England) Darryl Pilgrim (Q) 87.22
(Poland) Krzysztof Ratajski 92.28	10–7	(England) Darren Webster 90.21	(England) James Wade 87.96	10–6	(England) Simon Stevenson 84.76
(Scotland) Peter Wright 88.75	9–10	(Northern Ireland) Nathan Rafferty 91.85	(England) Chris Dobey 93.74	10–2	(England) Harry Ward (Q) 85.01
(Scotland) John Henderson 87.81	4–10	(England) Matthew Edgar 91.00	(Australia) Paul Nicholson 84.37	6–10	(England) Paul Hogan (Q) 86.27
(Netherlands) Michael van Gerwen 96.47	8–10	(Netherlands) Jeffrey de Zwaan 96.77	(Scotland) Gary Anderson 97.41	10–3	(England) Robert Rickwood 94.88
(England) Michael Smith 98.38	10–5	(England) Kirk Shepherd 86.36	(Australia) Simon Whitlock 89.60	7–10	(England) Ian White 96.01
(England) Mervyn King 99.46	10–4	(Netherlands) Raymond van Barneveld 86.78	(England) Rob Cross 99.32	10–8	(England) Nathan Aspinall 94.87
(Northern Ireland) Daryl Gurney 95.93	10–9	(Netherlands) Jelle Klaasen 88.23	(Germany) Martin Schindler 97.78	10–7	(England) Ryan Harrington 89.57
(England) Adrian Lewis 88.58	5–10	(Netherlands) Dirk van Duijvenbode 94.00	(Wales) Gerwyn Price 89.94	10–6	(England) Alex Roy (Q) 88.36
(England) Justin Pipe 80.21	3–10	(England) Stephen Bunting 88.09	(England) Dave Chisnall 85.78	6–10	(England) Ryan Meikle 82.45
(Wales) Jonny Clayton 98.63	10–6	(England) Michael Barnard 93.64	(England) Dave Prins 85.02	4–10	(Netherlands) Ron Meulenkamp 88.83
(Australia) Kyle Anderson 92.11	10–7	(Netherlands) Vincent van der Voort 92.79	(England) Joe Cullen 89.77	8–10	(England) Keegan Brown 91.44
(Australia) Corey Cadby 92.21	10–5	(Austria) Michael Rasztovits 85.26	(Austria) ~~Zoran Lerchbacher~~*	w/o	(England) Jamie Hughes

* Lerchbacher was the only third-round qualifier to withdraw from the tournament due to the weather conditions, so Hughes received a bye to the fourth round.

=== Saturday 3 March ===
==== Fourth round (best of nineteen legs) ====
Player	Score	Player	Player	Score	Player
(Netherlands) Jeffrey de Zwaan 100.12	8–10	(England) Paul Hogan (Q) 97.61	(England) Rob Cross 98.29	10–7	(Australia) Kyle Anderson 95.11
(Netherlands) Ron Meulenkamp 86.55	9–10	(Canada) John Part 87.41	(Wales) Robert Owen 96.61	10–9	(Northern Ireland) Nathan Rafferty 96.75
(England) Jason Lowe 92.12	5–10	(England) Chris Dobey 95.72	(Poland) Krzysztof Ratajski 92.95	10–5	(England) Keegan Brown 95.66
(Wales) Gerwyn Price 97.95	10–6	(Netherlands) Dirk van Duijvenbode 94.68	(England) Steve West 95.42	10–7	(England) Matthew Edgar 87.61
(Scotland) Gary Anderson 93.97	10–3	(England) Ricky Evans 87.64	(Netherlands) Jermaine Wattimena 89.32	10–8	(England) Stephen Bunting 94.66
(England) Mervyn King 94.97	10–8	(Wales) Jonny Clayton 89.89	(Australia) Corey Cadby 97.20	10–7	(Germany) Martin Schindler 92.06
(England) Jamie Hughes 95.84	8–10	(England) Ian White 102.45	(Northern Ireland) Daryl Gurney 89.33	5–10	(Belgium) Kim Huybrechts 94.45
(England) Michael Smith 90.30	10–4	(England) Ryan Meikle 85.62	(England) David Pallett 98.43	10–6	(England) James Wade 94.23

==== Fifth round (best of nineteen legs) ====
Player	Score	Player
(England) Michael Smith 93.99	9–10	(England) Steve West 93.91
(Scotland) Gary Anderson 104.72	10–6	(Netherlands) Jermaine Wattimena 97.27
(Australia) Corey Cadby 98.79	10–7	(England) Chris Dobey 96.23
(England) Mervyn King 87.84	8–10	(Canada) John Part 86.14
(England) Ian White 92.24	7–10	(Wales) Robert Owen 92.76
(Belgium) Kim Huybrechts 84.08	7–10	(England) David Pallett 88.10
(Wales) Gerwyn Price 101.45	10–9	(England) Paul Hogan (Q) 96.18
(Poland) Krzysztof Ratajski 92.63	3–10	(England) Rob Cross 103.88

=== Sunday 4 March ===
==== Quarter-finals (best of nineteen legs) ====
Player	Score	Player
(England) Steve West 91.56	5–10	(England) David Pallett 95.30
(Wales) Robert Owen 98.94	10–3	(Canada) John Part 80.72
(Australia) Corey Cadby 99.32	10–6	(Wales) Gerwyn Price 94.25
(England) Rob Cross 95.53	5–10	(Scotland) Gary Anderson 98.31

==== Semi-finals and Final (best of twenty-one legs) ====
Semi-finals (best of 21 legs)
(Scotland) Gary Anderson 95.31	11
(England) David Pallett 87.40	7
(Wales) Robert Owen 90.15	3
(Australia) Corey Cadby 99.90	11

Final (best of 21 legs)
(Scotland) Gary Anderson 95.71	11
(Australia) Corey Cadby 99.78	7
