= 2015 International Darts Open =

Tournament information
- Dates: 19–21 June 2015
- Venue: SACHSENarena
- Location: Riesa, Germany
- Organisation(s): Professional Darts Corporation (PDC)
- Format: Legs
- Prize fund: £115,000
- Winner's share: £25,000
- High checkout: 167 Benito van de Pas

Champion(s)
- Michael Smith (ENG)

The 2015 International Darts Open was the fifth of nine PDC European Tour events on the 2015 PDC Pro Tour. The tournament took place at the SACHSENarena, Riesa, from 19 to 21 June 2015. It featured a field of 48 players and £115,000 in prize money, with £25,000 going to the winner.

Michael Smith won his second European title after defeating Benito van de Pas 6–3 in the final.

Van de Pas ended Michael van Gerwen's winning streak of 21 games on the 2015 European tour and hit the two best checkouts (167 and 158) of the tournament en route to the final.

== Prize money ==
The prize fund was increased to £115,000 after being £100,000 for the previous two years.

Stage (num. of players)		Prize money
Winner	(1)	£25,000
Runner-up	(1)	£10,000
Semi-finalists	(2)	£5,000
Quarter-finalists	(4)	£3,500
Third round losers	(8)	£2,000
Second round losers	(16)	£1,500
First round losers	(16)	£1,000
Total	£115,000	

== Qualification and format ==
The top 16 players from the PDC ProTour Order of Merit on 9 May 2015 automatically qualified for the event. The remaining 32 places went to players from three qualifying events - 20 from the UK Qualifier (held in Crawley on 15 May), eight from the European Qualifier (held in Riesa on 18 June) and four from the Host Nation Qualifier (also held on 18 June). The following players took part in the tournament:

Top 16
1. (Netherlands) Michael van Gerwen (third round)
2. (Scotland) Peter Wright (third round)
3. (England) Michael Smith (winner)
4. (Northern Ireland) Brendan Dolan (third round)
5. (Australia) Simon Whitlock (second round)
6. (Netherlands) Vincent van der Voort (second round)
7. (England) Ian White (semi-finals)
8. (England) Mervyn King (second round)
9. (England) Justin Pipe (quarter-finals)
10. (Scotland) Robert Thornton (third round)
11. (England) Terry Jenkins (quarter-finals)
12. (Belgium) Kim Huybrechts (semi-finals)
13. (England) Dave Chisnall (quarter-finals)
14. (England) Steve Beaton (third round)
15. (England) Jamie Caven (second round)
16. (Netherlands) Benito van de Pas (runner-up)

UK Qualifier
- (England) Stephen Bunting (quarter-finals)
- (Canada) Ken MacNeil (first round)
- (Scotland) John Henderson (first round)
- (England) Jamie Robinson (first round)
- (England) Matt Clark (second round)
- (England) Dean Winstanley (first round)
- (England) Matthew Edgar (second round)
- (Wales) Jamie Lewis (second round)
- (Scotland) Mark Barilli (second round)
- (Wales) Mark Webster (first round)
- (England) Mark Walsh (first round)
- (England) Darren Webster (first round)
- (Republic of Ireland) William O'Connor (second round)
- (England) James Wilson (second round)
- (Northern Ireland) Daryl Gurney (third round)
- (England) Eddie Dootson (first round)
- (England) Kevin McDine (first round)
- (England) Adam Hunt (first round)
- (Northern Ireland) Mickey Mansell (second round)
- (Wales) Jonny Clayton (second round)

European Qualifier
- (Netherlands) Christian Kist (first round)
- (Austria) Mensur Suljović (second round)
- (Spain) Cristo Reyes (second round)
- (Belgium) Mike De Decker (first round)
- (Austria) Rowby-John Rodriguez (third round)
- (Spain) Antonio Alcinas (first round)
- (Croatia) Robert Marijanović (second round)
- (Netherlands) Jeffrey de Zwaan (first round)

Host Nation Qualifier
- (Germany) Max Hopp (third round)
- (Germany) Jyhan Artut (first round)
- (Germany) Daniel Zygla (first round)
- (Germany) Tomas Seyler (second round)

== Draw ==
First round (best of 11 legs); 19 June
(Republic of Ireland) William O'Connor 89.39	6
(Belgium) Mike De Decker 82.94	2
(Austria) Mensur Suljović 93.10	6
(England) Mark Walsh 82.76	2
(Germany) Max Hopp 87.43	6
(England) Kevin McDine 87.76	2
(England) James Wilson 91.83	6
(England) Eddie Dootson 85.84	2
(Northern Ireland) Daryl Gurney 96.86	6
(Canada) Ken MacNeil 91.02	4
(England) Dean Winstanley 88.82	1
(Spain) Cristo Reyes 100.63	6
(Netherlands) Christian Kist 80.24	0
(Croatia) Robert Marijanović 87.55	6
(England) Darren Webster 81.87	5
(England) Matthew Edgar 88.25	6
(Scotland) John Henderson 91.28	5
(England) Matt Clark 95.06	6
(England) Stephen Bunting 93.05	6
(England) Jamie Robinson 91.71	2
(Northern Ireland) Mickey Mansell 91.31	6
(Netherlands) Jeffrey de Zwaan 80.97	1
(Germany) Tomas Seyler 85.96	6
(Spain) Antonio Alcinas 80.03	1
(Austria) Rowby-John Rodriguez 90.76	6
(England) Adam Hunt 90.16	4
(Wales) Mark Webster 86.61	3
(Wales) Jamie Lewis 92.75	6
(Germany) Jyhan Artut 85.21	4
(Wales) Jonny Clayton 83.06	6
(Scotland) Mark Barilli 74.57	6
(Germany) Daniel Zygla 71.24	4

Second round (best of 11 legs); 20 June
1	(Netherlands) Michael van Gerwen 101.42	6
(Republic of Ireland) William O'Connor 94.10	5
16	(Netherlands) Benito van de Pas 95.89	6
(Austria) Mensur Suljović 88.84	5
8	(England) Mervyn King 85.77	3
(Germany) Max Hopp 88.19	6
9	(England) Justin Pipe 98.20	6
(England) James Wilson 93.00	5
5	(Australia) Simon Whitlock 95.67	5
(Northern Ireland) Daryl Gurney 94.54	6
12	(Belgium) Kim Huybrechts 91.53	6
(Spain) Cristo Reyes 94.66	5
4	(Northern Ireland) Brendan Dolan 88.47	6
(Croatia) Robert Marijanović 83.12	5
13	(England) Dave Chisnall 101.33	6
(England) Matthew Edgar 87.21	0
2	(Scotland) Peter Wright 103.66	6
(England) Matt Clark 81.11	0
15	(England) Jamie Caven 88.68	3
(England) Stephen Bunting 91.63	6
7	(England) Ian White 92.68	6
(Northern Ireland) Mickey Mansell 89.37	4
10	(Scotland) Robert Thornton 83.57	6
(Germany) Tomas Seyler 82.84	5
6	(Netherlands) Vincent van der Voort 91.72	4
(Austria) Rowby-John Rodriguez 88.72	6
11	(England) Terry Jenkins 94.60	6
(Wales) Jamie Lewis 90.16	4
3	(England) Michael Smith 85.19	6
(Wales) Jonny Clayton 75.35	4
14	(England) Steve Beaton 88.90	6
(Scotland) Mark Barilli 70.59	1

Third round (best of 11 legs); 21 June
1	(Netherlands) van Gerwen 97.68	4
16	(Netherlands) van de Pas 92.61	6
(Germany) Hopp 86.83	2
9	(England) Pipe 89.63	6
(Northern Ireland) Gurney 93.18	4
12	(Belgium) Huybrechts 92.22	6
4	(Northern Ireland) Dolan 92.78	2
13	(England) Chisnall 104.97	6
2	(Scotland) Wright 100.10	5
(England) Bunting 104.11	6
7	(England) White 103.01	6
10	(Scotland) Thornton 92.96	4
(Austria) Rodriguez 89.43	2
11	(England) Jenkins 98.62	6
3	(England) Smith 96.33	6
14	(England) Beaton 92.72	3

Quarter-finals (best of 11 legs); 21 June
16	(Netherlands) van de Pas 89.28	6
9	(England) Pipe 91.13	4
12	(Belgium) Huybrechts 95.55	6
13	(England) Chisnall 97.73	4
(England) Bunting 99.96	5
7	(England) White 105.12	6
11	(England) Jenkins 93.52	5
3	(England) Smith 101.35	6

Semi-finals (best of 11 legs); 21 June
16	(Netherlands) van de Pas 95.41	6
12	(Belgium) Huybrechts 95.18	3
7	(England) White 88.95	3
3	(England) Smith 92.46	6

Final (best of 11 legs); 21 June
16	(Netherlands) van de Pas 81.41	3
3	(England) Smith 88.23	6
