= Matthew Edgar =

English darts player (born 1986)

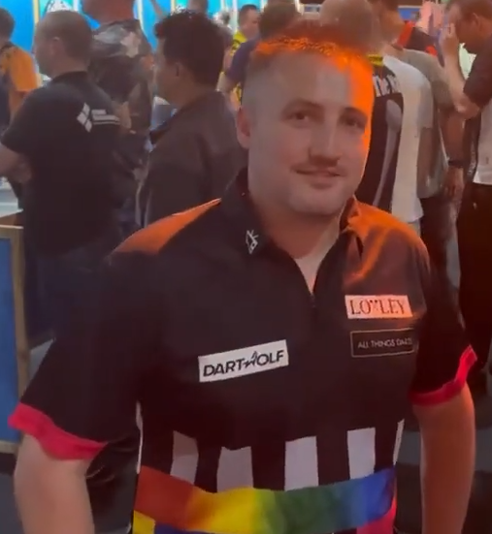
- Edgar in 2022

Personal information
- Nickname: "Prime Time"
- Born: 28 August 1986 (age 40) Doncaster, England
- Home town: Daventry, England

Sport
- Sport: Darts
- Playing since: 2001
- Darts: 21g Mission Signature
- Laterality: Right-handed
- Walk-on music: "Sweet Child o' Mine" by Guns N' Roses

Organisation (see split in darts)
- PDC: 2011–2022 (Tour Card 2012–2013, 2015–2016, 2018–2021)
- WDF: 2023–present
- Current world ranking: (WDF) 56 (17 August 2026)

WDF major events – best performances
- World Championship: Last 48: 2024
- World Masters: Quarter-final: 2026

PDC premier events – best performances
- World Championship: Last 64: 2021
- UK Open: Last 32: 2011, 2018, 2020
- PC Finals: Last 64: 2016, 2018, 2019

Other tournament wins
- Years
Warwickshire Open	2011
WDF Events (x3)
Iceland Masters	2023
Slovenian Open	2023
Hungarian Masters	2026
PDC Challenge Tour (x2)
2014, 2017

Matthew Edgar (born 28 August 1986) is an English darts player, commentator, pundit and YouTuber. Nicknamed "Prime Time", Edgar has won three World Darts Federation (WDF) ranking titles and two titles on the PDC Challenge Tour.

Edgar previously competed in Professional Darts Corporation (PDC) events, having three stints as a PDC Tour Card holder from 2012 to 2021. Since losing his Tour Card, he has competed in WDF events and focused on other ventures, including working as a darts commentator and pundit, and running his YouTube channel named "Edgar TV Darts". He has participated in four World Championships—three PDC World Championships and one WDF World Championship—and ten UK Opens.

== Career ==
=== 2011 ===
Edgar joined the PDC in 2011, and qualified for the 2011 UK Open. He defeated Nigel Heydon, Andy Pearce and Martyn Turner on the way to the last 32, where he lost to Andy Boulton 9–5.

=== 2012 ===
In January 2012, he entered the Professional Darts Corporation Pro Tour 'Q School' qualifying tournament. On the first day, Edgar lost to Darren Whittingham 6–4 at the final stage. After four days playing in the event in Barnsley, Edgar gained his professional tour card for the 2012 and 2013 seasons. His best results of 2012 came in two UK Open Qualifiers, where he lost in the last 16 to Johnny Haines and Richie Howson respectively. These results helped him to reach the UK Open for the second time where he was beaten in the second round by Kevin McDine. He could not advance beyond the last 32 in any of the rest of the events he played in the year.

=== 2013 ===
Edgar went into 2013 ranked world number 81, and reached his first PDC quarter-final at the eighth UK Open Qualifier where he was edged out 5–6 by Adrian Lewis. He was seeded 50th for the UK Open itself, meaning he began at the second round stage, with a 5–4 win over Colin Osborne. He faced reigning champion Robert Thornton in the third round and led 6–4, before going on to lose 7–9. Edgar also qualified for two European Tour events during the year, losing in the first round of the Gibraltar Darts Trophy and beating Stuart Kellett 6–1 at the German Darts Championship before being defeated 6–2 by Paul Nicholson in the second round.

=== 2014 ===
Edgar began 2014 outside of the world's top 64 and entered Q School in an attempt to win his place back, coming closest on the third day when he advanced to the last 32 but lost 5–2 to Darron Brown. Edgar only had PDPA Associate Member status for the year ahead which allowed him to compete in UK Open and European Tour qualifiers as well as the Challenge Tour. He qualified for the UK Open and lost 5–3 to Spain's Antonio Alcinas in the second round. Edgar was a runner-up in the first Challenge Tour event of the year when he lost 5–4 to Jamie Robinson, but he went one better in the fourth event by claiming the title with a deciding leg victory over Mark Frost. He came within a match of qualifying for both the 2014 Grand Slam of Darts and 2015 World Championship but was beaten on both occasions.

=== 2015 ===
On the second day of 2015 Q School, Edgar won seven matches ending with a 5–0 whitewash of Andy Boulton to earn a new two-year tour card. He reached the quarter-finals of the third UK Open Qualifier, but was edged out 6–5 by Adrian Lewis. Edgar also suffered a narrow defeat in the second round of the UK Open, 5–4 against Jason Mold. The only European Tour event he could qualify for was the 2015 International Darts Open and he beat Darren Webster 6–5, but was whitewahsed by Dave Chisnall 6–0 in the second round.

=== 2016 ===
A last 16 showing in the final qualifier saw Edgar enter the UK Open at the second round stage and he beat Mark Wilson 6–4, before losing 9–3 to Mark Webster. He had two last 16 finishes in Players Championship events, before reaching the quarter-finals for the only time this season at the final one by defeating Jelle Klaasen, Wayne Jones, Cristo Reyes and Robbie Green, before losing to Benito van de Pas 6–2. It was this result which saw Edgar make his debut in the Players Championship Finals and he lost to Simon Whitlock 6–3 in the first round.

=== 2017 ===
With his tour card status now expired, Edgar entered Q–School. He finished 13th on the Order of Merit, just one point shy of reclaiming his place. A host of injuries including a broken hand restricted the amount of entries available through the year which meant he did not qualify for 2017 UK Open, the first time in Edgar's career he did not qualify. In the Summer, Edgar won a second Challenge Tour title by beating Barrie Bates 5–2 in the final.

=== 2018 ===
Edgar re-gained his PDC Tour Card at Q–School, finishing 9th on the UK Q–School Order of Merit.

On the 2018 PDC Pro Tour, he competed in the 2018 UK Open Qualifiers.

At UK Open Qualifier 1 he defeated Adam Hunt 6–5 in a deciding leg, Mick McGowan 6–1, Mark Webster 6–5 in a deciding leg and Mervyn King 6–2 to reach the fourth round (Last 16), where he was beaten by Kyle Anderson, who averaged 107.32 to Edgar's 95.40, 6–2.

At UK Open Qualifier 2, Edgar defeated Charlie Jackson 6–5 in a deciding leg and Philip Borthwick 6–4, then both Andrew Gilding and Cristo Reyes 6–5 in last-leg deciders. This meant Edgar reached the Last 16 in successive UK Open qualifiers, where he lost to Justin Pipe 6–5 in another deciding leg.

Edgar became the 23rd seed for the 2018 UK Open and entered in the third round. There, he achieved a 10–4 win over John Henderson, reaching the fourth round for the second time in his career, but lost to Steve West 10–7 in round 4.

In April Edgar made his return to the PDC European Tour at the 2018 German Darts Open, where he lost to Steve West 6–2 in the first round.

Edgar did enough on the Players Championship circuit to qualify for the 2018 Players Championship Finals where he met Michael van Gerwen in the first round and lost 6–2. He also managed to qualify for the 2019 PDC World Darts Championship through the ProTour.

=== 2019 ===
In the 2019 PDC World Darts Championship, Edgar played Darius Labanauskas in the first round and lost 3–1 despite winning the first set.

Edgar started the year off placed world number 68, so to maintain his tour card for next season he needed to jump 4 places in the rankings. He played in the 2019 UK Open where he made the third round before losing to Ryan Searle 6–3. He qualified again for the Players Championship Finals that year and played Dave Chisnall in the first round. He lost 6–2.

=== 2020 ===
Edgar had not managed to do enough on the tour to qualify for the 2020 PDC World Championship. He entered the last chance Tour Card Holder qualifier and managed to come through it with wins over Tytus Kanik, Gary Eastwood and Christian Bunse, before beating Adam Hunt 7–4 to book his place at Alexandra Palace. However, he lost to Darius Labanauskas once again.

He was unable to achieve qualification for a 3rd year running for the Players Championship Finals, however the day after the Players Championship Final at the Ricoh Arena in Coventry, he qualified for the 2021 PDC World Darts Championship via the UK Tour Card Holder Qualifiers, beating Josh Payne 7–2 in the last 8 to confirm his place in his 3rd successive PCC World Championship.

=== 2021 ===
Edgar finally progressed past the first round of the World Championship in the 2021 edition by whitewashing Maik Kuivenhoven 3–0 in sets. In round 2, he lost to Mensur Suljović 3–1.

=== 2022 ===
Matthew returned to PDC Q-School looking to regain his tour card. During the first 3 days, Edgar picked up 0 points, which left him needing to reach the Final on Day 4 as a minimum. The day brought the best out in Edgar, and he progressed to the Semi-Finals, the highlight being a 106.35 average against Kai Fan Leung in the Last 64. Unfortunately for Matt, he lost against Nathan Rafferty 6–3 in the Semi-Final, leaving him outside of the Tour Card spots in the Q-School Order of Merit.

=== 2023 ===
In 2023 Edgar won 2 WDF ranking events, the Iceland Masters and the Slovenian Open.

=== 2024 ===
Edgar was the runner-up at the 2024 Welsh Open, he lost to Andy Davidson 5–1 in the final.

Edgar qualified for the 2024 WDF World Darts Championship at the Lakeside Country Club virtue of being ranked 20th on their World Championship rankings race. He was drawn to play Dutch Open champion Jarno Bottenberg in the first round, who defeated him 2–0 in sets.

== Practice and personal life ==
Edgar practices with former world championship runner-up Kevin Painter. He has previously worked for Northampton Town as a sports coach. Edgar also runs a YouTube channel dedicated to darts called "Edgar TV Darts", where he regularly answers questions raised by followers and chronicles his journeys through various PDC and WDF competitions.

Before starting his darts career, Edgar was a professional wrestler and trained in mixed martial arts.

The Online Betting Guide, OLBG, began sponsoring Edgar in 2011 and have since sponsored the darts player intermittently for over 13 years. In 2024 they supported his journey to qualify for Lakeside 2024 at the WDF World Championships.

Edgar has a son.

== World Championship results ==
=== PDC World Championship ===
- 2019: First round (lost to Darius Labanauskas 1–3)
- 2020: First round (lost to Darius Labanauskas 0–3)
- 2021: Second round (lost to Mensur Suljović 1–3)

=== WDF World Championship ===
- 2024: First round (lost to Jarno Bottenberg 0–2)

== Performance timeline ==
=== PDC ===
Tournament	2011	2012	2013	2014	2015	2016	2018	2019	2020	2021
PDC Ranked televised events
World Championship	Did not qualify							1R	1R	2R
UK Open	4R	2R	3R	2R	2R	3R	4R	3R	5R	3R
Players Championship Finals	Did not qualify					1R	1R	1R	DNQ	
Career statistics
PDC Year-end ranking	96	102	81	141	107	77	86	66	66	62

=== WDF ===
Tournament	2024	2026
WDF Major/platinum events
World Championship	1R	
World Masters	4R	QF
WDF Year-end ranking	37	

==== European Tour ====
Season	1	2	3	4	5	6	7	8	9	10	11	12	13
2013	Did not qualify				GDT; 1R	GDC; 2R	DNQ						
2015	Did not qualify				IDO; 2R	Did not qualify							
2018	DNQ		GDO; 1R	Did not qualify									EDT; 3R
2019	EDO; 1R	Did not qualify				EDG; 1R	DNQ				EDM; 1R	DNQ	

==== Players Championships ====
Season	1	2	3	4	5	6	7	8	9	10	11	12	13	14	15	16	17	18	19	20	21	22	23	24	25	26	27	28	29	30	31
2011 (Note: Not a Tour card holder)	DNP			DER; 1R	CRA; 2R	DNP			CRA; 1R	CRA; 3R	BAR; 3R	BAR; 1R	NUL; 2R	NUL; 1R	ONT; 2R	ONT; 3R	DER; 1R	DER; 1R	NUL; 2R	NUL; 1R	DUB; 1R	DUB; 3R	KIL; 4R	GLA; 2R	GLA; 2R	ALI; 1R	ALI; 2R	CRA; 1R	CRA; 1R	WIG; 1R	WIG; 1R
2012	ALI; 2R	ALI; 2R	REA; 2R	REA; 1R	CRA; 1R	CRA; 1R	BIR; 2R	BIR; 2R	CRA; 1R	CRA; 2R	BAR; 1R	BAR; 1R	DUB; 2R	DUB; 1R	KIL; 3R	KIL; 1R	CRA; 1R	CRA; 2R	BAR; 2R	BAR; 1R											
2013	WIG; 1R	WIG; 3R	WIG; 1R	WIG; 2R	CRA; 1R	CRA; 2R	BAR; 1R	BAR; 2R	DUB; 1R	DUB; 2R	KIL; 2R	KIL; PR	WIG; 2R	WIG; 2R	BAR; 1R	BAR; 1R															
2014	BAR; 1R	BAR; 3R	CRA; DNP	CRA; 1R	Did not participate												CRA; 1R	CRA; 2R	COV; 1R	COV; 3R											
2015	BAR; 1R	BAR; 1R	BAR; 1R	BAR; 2R	BAR; 2R	COV; 1R	COV; 1R	COV; 1R	CRA; 2R	CRA; 2R	BAR; 2R	BAR; 1R	WIG; 1R	WIG; 1R	BAR; 1R	BAR; 2R	DUB; 2R	DUB; 3R	COV; 2R	COV; 1R											
2016	BAR; 2R	BAR; 1R	BAR; 2R	BAR; 1R	BAR; 1R	BAR; 3R	BAR; 1R	COV; 2R	COV; 2R	BAR; 4R	BAR; 1R	BAR; 1R	BAR; 1R	BAR; 1R	BAR; 1R	BAR; 1R	DUB; 4R	DUB; 1R	BAR; 1R	BAR; QF											
2017	BAR; 1R	BAR; 1R	BAR; 1R	BAR; 1R	MIL; DNP	MIL; 2R	BAR; DNP	BAR; DNP	WIG; DNP	WIG; DNP	MIL; 1R	MIL; 1R	WIG; DNP	WIG; DNP	BAR; 1R	BAR; 2R	BAR; 2R	BAR; 1R	DUB; 2R	DUB; 2R	BAR; DNP	BAR; DNP									
2018	BAR; 1R	BAR; 1R	BAR; 1R	BAR; 3R	MIL; 4R	MIL; 1R	BAR; 1R	BAR; 2R	WIG; 2R	WIG; 2R	MIL; 2R	MIL; 2R	WIG; 1R	WIG; 2R	BAR; 2R	BAR; 1R	BAR; 1R	BAR; 3R	DUB; 2R	DUB; 3R	BAR; 2R	BAR; 3R									
2019	WIG; 2R	WIG; 1R	WIG; 1R	WIG; QF	BAR; 1R	BAR; 2R	WIG; 2R	WIG; 2R	BAR; 3R	BAR; 3R	BAR; 2R	BAR; 1R	BAR; 1R	BAR; 2R	BAR; 1R	BAR; 1R	WIG; 3R	WIG; 1R	BAR; 3R	BAR; 3R	HIL; 3R	HIL; 1R	BAR; 1R	BAR; 2R	BAR; 3R	BAR; 4R	DUB; 1R	DUB; 1R	BAR; 1R	BAR; 1R	
2020	BAR; 2R	BAR; 1R	WIG; 1R	WIG; 2R	WIG; 1R	WIG; 1R	BAR; 1R	BAR; 1R	MIL; 2R	MIL; 3R	MIL; 3R	MIL; 1R	MIL; 3R	NIE; 2R	NIE; 2R	NIE; 2R	NIE; 3R	NIE; 1R	COV; 1R	COV; 1R	COV; 1R	COV; 1R	COV; 1R								
2021	BOL; 1R	BOL; 1R	BOL; 1R	BOL; 1R	MIL; 1R	MIL; 2R	MIL; 1R	MIL; 2R	NIE; 3R	NIE; 3R	NIE; 1R	NIE; 1R	MIL; 1R	MIL; 1R	MIL; 1R	MIL; 2R	COV; 2R	COV; 1R	COV; 3R	COV; 2R	BAR; 1R	BAR; 2R	BAR; 3R	BAR; 2R	BAR; 1R	BAR; 1R	BAR; 1R	BAR; 1R	BAR; 2R	BAR; QF	
2022	BAR; DNP	BAR; DNP	WIG; DNP	WIG; DNP	BAR; DNP	BAR; 2R	NIE; 1R	NIE; 2R	BAR; DNP	BAR; DNP	BAR; DNP	BAR; 1R	BAR; 1R	WIG; 3R	WIG; 2R	NIE; 1R	NIE; 2R	BAR; DNP	BAR; DNP	BAR; 1R	BAR; 1R	BAR; DNP	BAR; DNP	BAR; 1R	BAR; DNP	BAR; DNP	BAR; DNP	BAR; 1R	BAR; DNP	BAR; DNP	

Performance Table Legend
W	Won the tournament	F	Finalist	SF	Semifinalist	QF	Quarterfinalist	#R; RR; L#	Lost in # round Round-robin; Last # stage	DQ	Disqualified
DNQ	Did not qualify	DNP	Did not participate	WD	Withdrew	NH	Tournament not held	#R; RR; L#	Lost in # round Round-robin; Last # stage	NYF	Not yet founded
