= Paul Hogan (darts player) =

English darts player (born 1963)

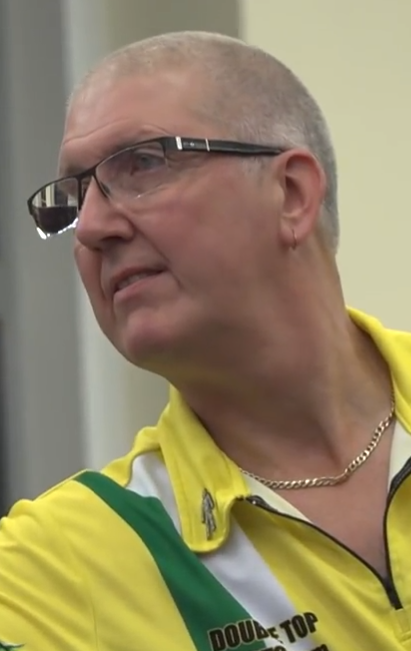
- Hogan in 2019

Personal information
- Nicknames: "Crocodile Dundee" "Hogey"
- Born: 30 August 1963 (age 63) Tividale, Sandwell, England
- Home town: Basingstoke, England

Sport
- Sport: Darts
- Playing since: 1989
- Darts: 23g Signature
- Laterality: Right-handed
- Walk-on music: "Crocodile Rock" by Elton John

Organisation (see split in darts)
- BDO: 1995–2020
- WDF: 1995–
- WSDT: 2022–2025

WDF major events – best performances
- World Championship: Quarter-final: 1995, 2006, 2020
- World Masters: Last 16: 2019
- World Trophy: Last 32: 2005, 2006, 2019
- Int. Darts League: Last 16: 2006
- Finder Masters: Last 24 Group: 2005

PDC premier events – best performances
- UK Open: Last 16: 2017, 2018

WSDT major events – best performances
- World Championship: Quarter-final: 2024
- World Matchplay: Semi-final: 2023
- World Masters: Semi-final: 2024

Other tournament wins
- Years
BDO Gold Cup	2013
British Classic	2005
Bucks Easter Open	2013, 2014, 2015
City Classic (Midlands)	1990
Warwickshire Open	1995
Hampshire Open	2002
Isle of Man Masters	2025
Mill Rythe Darts Festival	2003
Modus Super Series Weekly Winner	2024
Oxfordshire Open	2008
Poole Labour Club Singles	2008
Benidorm Open	2016
Worthingtons Darts	2017
WSDT LP Metal Detecting	2024

Paul Hogan (born 30 August 1963) is an English professional darts player who competes in World Darts Federation (WDF) events. He is nicknamed "Crocodile Dundee" after the film starring his namesake, Australian actor Paul Hogan.

== Career ==
Hogan made his World Championship debut in 1995, reaching the quarter-finals. He beat Per Skau and Sean Palfrey before losing to Richie Burnett who went on to win the tournament. He returned the next year but couldn't repeat his performance of twelve months earlier, losing in the first round to Matt Clark. He failed to qualify for 1997 and 98 but did so for the 1999 World Championship, but again lost in the first round to Colin Monk. It wouldn't be until 2004 where Hogan would return to the Lakeside, beating Bob Taylor in the first round but lost in the second round to then-reigning World Champion Raymond van Barneveld. In 2006, he equalled his best performance at the Lakeside with a quarter-final place. He beat Dutchmen Mareno Michels and Albertino Essers in the first two rounds before losing to another Dutchman Jelle Klaasen who, like Burnett 11 years earlier, was the eventual champion. Hogan returned in 2007, but lost in the first round to Shaun Greatbatch. Hogan subsequently failed to qualify for several years afterwards.

Hogan has also reached the last 32 stage of the Winmau World Masters on three occasions, in 1989, 1998, 2003 and 2014. Hogan also played in the UK Open in 2003, losing in the second round to Terry Jenkins.

2005 saw Hogan claim his maiden Open Tournament, winning the British Classic, gaining wins over John Walton, Steve Farmer, Mike Veitch, and Jamie Caven before beating Gary Anderson in the final.

Hogan was less prolific in the years that followed, but he caused a surprise by coming through the qualifiers for the 2014 BDO World Darts Championship, his first qualification for the Lakeside tournament in seven years. He won his preliminary game against Karel Sedláček before being defeated 3–2 by Scott Mitchell despite hitting finishes of 161, 141, and 90 on the bullseye when Mitchell first threw for the match. Hogan followed up this success with a strong showing at the 2014 UK Open, notably beating three-time world champion John Part 5–0 in the opening session and following it up with a 9–3 win over Benito van de Pas to become the first player to reach the fourth round.

Paul Hogan qualified for the 2015 UK Open for which he had another good run defeating Lee Russell, Derek Bland, Darren Johnson and Benito van de Pas before losing to World Number 1 Michael van Gerwen 9–4.

Hogan returned to prominence at the 2017 BDO World Darts Championship when he beat Martin Phillips to face world number one Glen Durrant and almost caused a huge upset. Hogan won 11 of the first 13 legs of the match to lead 3–0 in sets and 2–0 in legs. Needing one leg to win and with 16 points required, Hogan hit double-16 to bust his score and Durrant made a comeback to win 4–3. Durrant went on to win the title.

Hogan rebounded by once again qualifying for the UK Open at Minehead, where he defeated Keegan Brown and Jamie Lewis in the opening two rounds, before upsetting back-to-back two-time world champions Gary Anderson and Adrian Lewis to reach the last 16. He was beaten by eventual runner-up Gerwyn Price.

Over the weekend of the 25 and 26 March Hogan represented England in the BDO British Internationals. On Saturday 25th, Paul Hogan defeated Martin Phillips of Wales 4–3 in legs with a 30.10 1-dart average (90.30 3-dart) as part of a 12–0 whitewash for England over their Welsh counterparts. On the 26th England defeated Scotland 10–2 to win the title, Hogan's 4–1 victory over Alan Soutar will be remembered for the 9-darter he threw in the fifth and final leg.

Hogan again qualified for the UK Open at Minehead. He beat Darren Brown, Paul Nicholson and Jeffrey de Zwaan before losing a close last 16 match against Gerwyn Price 10–9.

Paul Hogan qualified for another World Championship in the 2019 BDO World Darts Championship, where he lost in first round. In the 2020 BDO World Darts Championship he made a third quarter-final in a third different decade only to lose to Jim Williams 5–1.

== World Championship results ==
=== BDO/WDF ===
- 1995: Quarter-finals (lost to Richie Burnett 2–4)
- 1996: First round (lost to Matt Clark 2–3)
- 1999: First round (lost to Colin Monk 2–3)
- 2004: Second round (lost to Raymond van Barneveld 1–3)
- 2006: Quarter-finals (lost to Jelle Klaasen 4–5)
- 2007: First round (lost to Shaun Greatbatch 1–3)
- 2014: First round (lost to Scott Mitchell 2–3)
- 2017: Second round (lost to Glen Durrant 3–4)
- 2019: First round (lost to Willem Mandigers 0–3)
- 2020: Quarter-finals (lost to Jim Williams 1–5)
- 2022: First round (lost to Justin Thompson 1–2)

=== WSDT ===
- 2024: Quarter-finals (lost to Jim Long 2–3)
- 2025: Second round (lost to Steve Beaton 0–3)

== Performance timeline ==
BDO

Tournament	1989	1990–1994	1995	1996	1997	1998	1999	2000	2001	2002	2003	2004	2005	2006	2007	2008	2009	2010	2011	2012	2013	2014	2015	2016	2017	2018	2019	2020
BDO World Championship	DNQ		QF	1R	DNQ		1R	Did not qualify				2R	DNQ	QF	1R	Did not qualify						1R	DNQ		2R	DNQ	1R	QF
World Masters	3R	Did not qualify				3R	Did not qualify				3R	1R	Prel.	3R	DNQ	3R	2R	2R	4R	2R	4R	5R	2R	2R	1R	3R	4R	NH
Finder Darts Masters	Not held		Not held					DNP					RR	NH	Did not participate												Not held	
World Darts Trophy	Not held									DNQ			1R	1R	DNQ	Not held												
International Darts League	Not held										DNQ			RR	Prel.	Not held												
BDO World Trophy	Not held																					Did not participate					1R	NH

PDC

Tournament	2003	2004–2013	2014	2015	2016	2017	2018
PDC Ranked televised events
UK Open	2R	Did not qualify	4R	4R	2R	5R	5R

Performance Table Legend
W	Won the tournament	F	Finalist	SF	Semifinalist	QF	Quarterfinalist	#R; RR; Prel.	Lost in # round Round-robin; Preliminary round	DQ	Disqualified
DNQ	Did not qualify	DNP	Did not participate	WD	Withdrew	NH	Tournament not held	#R; RR; Prel.	Lost in # round Round-robin; Preliminary round	NYF	Not yet founded
