= 2016 Gibraltar Darts Trophy =

Tournament information
- Dates: 6–8 May 2016
- Venue: Victoria Stadium
- Location: Gibraltar
- Organisation(s): Professional Darts Corporation (PDC)
- Format: Legs
- Prize fund: £115,000
- Winner's share: £25,000
- High checkout: 164 Michael Smith

Champion(s)
- Michael van Gerwen (NED)

The 2016 Gibraltar Darts Trophy was the third of ten PDC European Tour events on the 2016 PDC Pro Tour. The tournament took place at the Victoria Stadium, Gibraltar, from 6 to 8 May 2016. It featured a field of 48 players and £115,000 in prize money, with £25,000 going to the winner.

Michael van Gerwen retained his title by defeating Dave Chisnall 6–2 in the final, after almost crashing out to the Gibraltarian Host Nation qualifier Dyson Parody, who missed three match darts in their quarter-final match.

== Prize money ==
The prize money of the European Tour events stays the same as last year.

| Stage (num. of players) | | Prize money |
|---|---|---|
| Winner | (1) | £25,000 |
| Runner-up | (1) | £10,000 |
| Semi-finalists | (2) | £5,000 |
| Quarter-finalists | (4) | £3,500 |
| Third round losers | (8) | £2,000 |
| Second round losers | (16) | £1,500 |
| First round losers | (16) | £1,000 |
| Total | £115,000 | |

== Qualification and format ==
The top 16 players from the PDC ProTour Order of Merit on 4 March automatically qualified for the event and were seeded in the second round. The remaining 32 places went to players from three qualifying events - 20 from the UK Qualifier (held in Barnsley on 11 March), eight from the European Qualifier on 22 April and four from the Host Nation Qualifier on 5 May.

Adrian Lewis withdrew for personal reasons just as the tournament began, and was not replaced. This gave Max Hopp a bye to the third round.

The following players took part in the tournament:

Top 16
1. (Netherlands) Michael van Gerwen (winner)
2. (Scotland) Peter Wright (quarter-finals)
3. (England) Michael Smith (third round)
4. (England) James Wade (third round)
5. (Belgium) Kim Huybrechts (semi-finals)
6. (England) Dave Chisnall (runner-up)
7. (England) Ian White (semi-finals)
8. (England) ~~Adrian Lewis (withdrew)~~
9. (Netherlands) Jelle Klaasen (second round)
10. (England) Terry Jenkins (second round)
11. (Scotland) Robert Thornton (third round)
12. (Netherlands) Benito van de Pas (third round)
13. (Scotland) Gary Anderson (quarter-finals)
14. (Austria) Mensur Suljović (quarter-finals)
15. (Australia) Simon Whitlock (third round)
16. (England) Mervyn King (third round)

UK Qualifier
- (England) Ross Smith (first round)
- (England) Nick Fullwell (second round)
- (England) Justin Pipe (second round)
- (England) Stephen Bunting (second round)
- (Wales) Gerwyn Price (second round)
- (Northern Ireland) Daryl Gurney (second round)
- (England) Alan Norris (second round)
- (Wales) Jamie Lewis (first round)
- (Scotland) John Henderson (second round)
- (England) Andy Hamilton (first round)
- (England) Steve Beaton (first round)
- (England) Mark Walsh (first round)
- (England) Steve West (second round)
- (England) Joe Murnan (third round)
- (England) David Pallett (first round)
- (England) Wayne Jones (first round)
- (Australia) Kyle Anderson (first round)
- (England) Kevin Painter (first round)
- (England) Joe Cullen (second round)
- (England) Stuart Kellett (first round)

European Qualifier
- (Germany) Max Hopp (third round)
- (Netherlands) Jermaine Wattimena (second round)
- (Austria) Rowby-John Rodriguez (first round)
- (Austria) Michael Rasztovits (second round)
- (Spain) Cristo Reyes (first round)
- (Netherlands) Dirk van Duijvenbode (first round)
- (Netherlands) Christian Kist (second round)
- (Spain) Antonio Alcinas (second round)

Host Nation Qualifier
- (Gibraltar) David Francis (first round)
- (Gibraltar) George Federico (first round)
- (Gibraltar) Dyson Parody (quarter-finals)
- (Gibraltar) Antony Lopez (first round)

== Draw ==
First round (best of 11 legs); 6 May
(England) Nick Fullwell 83.60 | 6
(Gibraltar) Antony Lopez 85.85 | 2
(Netherlands) Christian Kist 86.06 | 6
(Spain) Cristo Reyes 82.96 | 1
(England) Andy Hamilton 92.30 | 4
(Germany) Max Hopp 92.84 | 6
(Netherlands) Dirk van Duijvenbode 81.42 | 3
(Gibraltar) Dyson Parody 83.03 | 6
(England) Steve Beaton 85.66 | 4
(Austria) Michael Rasztovits 88.92 | 6
(England) Stephen Bunting 91.24 | 6
(England) Mark Walsh 82.20 | 1
(England) Justin Pipe 96.97 | 6
(Wales) Jamie Lewis 82.33 | 0
(England) Alan Norris 86.16 | 6
(Gibraltar) George Federico 69.80 | 1
(Northern Ireland) Daryl Gurney 102.10 | 6
(England) David Pallett 92.88 | 3
(Wales) Gerwyn Price 77.08 | 6
(Gibraltar) David Francis 68.16 | 0
(England) Stuart Kellett 90.22 | 1
(Spain) Antonio Alcinas 89.76 | 6
(England) Joe Murnan 86.51 | 6
(England) Ross Smith 86.95 | 2
(Australia) Kyle Anderson 90.88 | 4
(England) Steve West 89.17 | 6
(Scotland) John Henderson 77.70 | 6
(England) Wayne Jones 85.40 | 5
(England) Kevin Painter 92.40 | 5
(England) Joe Cullen 96.09 | 6
(Austria) Rowby-John Rodriguez 85.44 | 2
(Netherlands) Jermaine Wattimena 94.26 | 6

Second round (best of 11 legs); 7 May
1 | (Netherlands) Michael van Gerwen 95.04 | 6
(England) Nick Fullwell 84.52 | 4
16 | (England) Mervyn King 105.08 | 6
(Netherlands) Christian Kist 91.53 | 2
8 | (England) Adrian Lewis | w/d
(Germany) Max Hopp | w/o
9 | (Netherlands) Jelle Klaasen 93.28 | 5
(Gibraltar) Dyson Parody 93.39 | 6
5 | (Belgium) Kim Huybrechts 84.40 | 6
(Austria) Michael Rasztovits 83.26 | 4
12 | (Netherlands) Benito van de Pas 100.28 | 6
(England) Stephen Bunting 93.97 | 1
4 | (England) James Wade 86.01 | 6
(England) Justin Pipe 81.93 | 2
13 | (Scotland) Gary Anderson 91.75 | 6
(England) Alan Norris 98.84 | 2
2 | (Scotland) Peter Wright 95.51 | 6
(Northern Ireland) Daryl Gurney 92.55 | 3
15 | (Australia) Simon Whitlock 92.30 | 6
(Wales) Gerwyn Price 87.43 | 1
7 | (England) Ian White 89.65 | 6
(Spain) Antonio Alcinas 84.83 | 5
10 | (England) Terry Jenkins 103.88 | 4
(England) Joe Murnan 103.38 | 6
6 | (England) Dave Chisnall 98.77 | 6
(England) Steve West 95.90 | 5
11 | (Scotland) Robert Thornton 88.54 | 6
(Scotland) John Henderson 87.53 | 5
3 | (England) Michael Smith 98.54 | 6
(England) Joe Cullen 95.23 | 4
14 | (Austria) Mensur Suljović 91.14 | 6
(Netherlands) Jermaine Wattimena 88.39 | 2

Third round (best of 11 legs); 8 May
1 | (Netherlands) van Gerwen 105.73 | 6
16 | (England) King 101.01 | 3
(Germany) Hopp 87.33 | 4
(Gibraltar) Parody 87.43 | 6
5 | (Belgium) Huybrechts 97.05 | 6
12 | (Netherlands) van de Pas 94.97 | 2
4 | (England) Wade 100.78 | 2
13 | (Scotland) G. Anderson 104.73 | 6
2 | (Scotland) Wright 85.70 | 6
15 | (Australia) Whitlock 88.84 | 2
7 | (England) White 107.33 | 6
(England) Murnan 92.20 | 2
6 | (England) Chisnall 110.58 | 6
11 | (Scotland) Thornton 102.54 | 5
3 | (England) M. Smith 104.85 | 3
14 | (Austria) Suljović 101.59 | 6

Quarter-finals (best of 11 legs); 8 May
1 | (Netherlands) van Gerwen 100.04 | 6
(Gibraltar) Parody 96.52 | 5
5 | (Belgium) Huybrechts 85.53 | 6
13 | (Scotland) G. Anderson 87.57 | 5
2 | (Scotland) Wright 91.96 | 5
7 | (England) White 93.53 | 6
6 | (England) Chisnall 108.47 | 6
14 | (Austria) Suljović 97.97 | 5

Semi-finals (best of 11 legs); 8 May
1 | (Netherlands) van Gerwen 109.98 | 6
5 | (Belgium) Huybrechts 104.16 | 0
7 | (England) White 85.52 | 0
6 | (England) Chisnall 100.20 | 6

Final (best of 11 legs); 8 May
1 | (Netherlands) van Gerwen 103.89 | 6
6 | (England) Chisnall 103.19 | 2
