= 2019 European Darts Grand Prix =

Tournament information
- Dates: 10–12 May 2019
- Venue: Glaspalast
- Location: Sindelfingen
- Country: Germany
- Organisation(s): PDC
- Format: Legs
- Prize fund: £140,000
- Winner's share: £25,000
- High checkout: 170 (England) Darren Webster (England) Mark McGeeney (England) Ian White

Champion(s)
- (England) Ian White

The 2019 European Darts Grand Prix was the sixth of thirteen PDC European Tour events on the 2019 PDC Pro Tour. The tournament took place at Glaspalast, Sindelfingen, Germany, from 10 to 12 May 2019. It featured a field of 48 players and £140,000 in prize money, with £25,000 going to the winner.

Michael van Gerwen was the defending champion after defeating James Wade 8–3 in the final of the 2018 tournament, but he lost 6–3 to Peter Wright in the quarter-finals.

Ian White became the eighth player to win multiple European Tour titles after beating Wright 8–7 in the final. It was White's third consecutive final on the European Tour, a record matched only by Van Gerwen.

== Prize money ==
This is how the prize money is divided:

Stage (num. of players)		Prize money
Winner	(1)	£25,000
Runner-up	(1)	£10,000
Semi-finalists	(2)	£6,500
Quarter-finalists	(4)	£5,000
Third round losers	(8)	£3,000
Second round losers	(16)	£2,000*
First round losers	(16)	£1,000
Total	£140,000	

- Seeded players who lose in the second round do not receive this prize money on any Orders of Merit.

== Qualification and format ==
The top 16 entrants from the PDC ProTour Order of Merit on 4 April will automatically qualify for the event and will be seeded in the second round.

The remaining 32 places will go to players from six qualifying events – 18 from the UK Tour Card Holder Qualifier (held on 12 April), six from the European Tour Card Holder Qualifier (held on 12 April), two from the West & South European Associate Member Qualifier (held on 9 May), four from the Host Nation Qualifier (held on 9 May), one from the Nordic & Baltic Associate Member Qualifier (held on 2 February) and one from the East European Associate Member Qualifier (held on 9 March).

From 2019, the Host Nation, Nordic & Baltic and East European Qualifiers will only be available to non-tour card holders. Any tour card holders from the applicable regions will have to play the main European Qualifier.

Dave Chisnall, who was set to be the 12th seed, withdrew prior to the tournament draw due to family reasons. All seeds below him moved up a place, with Mervyn King becoming sixteenth seed, and an extra place being made available in the Host Nation Qualifier.

James Wade, the 10th seed, withdrew from the tournament after the draw and was not replaced, with his second round opponent Ryan Searle receiving a bye.

The following players will take part in the tournament:

Top 16

1. (Netherlands) Michael van Gerwen (quarter-finals)
2. (Wales) Gerwyn Price (third round)
3. (England) Ian White (champion)
4. (Northern Ireland) Daryl Gurney (third round)
5. (England) Adrian Lewis (second round)
6. (England) Rob Cross (second round)
7. (Austria) Mensur Suljović (second round)
8. (Scotland) Peter Wright (runner-up)
9. (Wales) Jonny Clayton (third round)
10. (England) ~~James Wade~~ (withdrew)
11. (England) Michael Smith (third round)
12. (England) Joe Cullen (second round)
13. (Germany) Max Hopp (second round)
14. (England) Ricky Evans (second round)
15. (England) Darren Webster (third round)
16. (England) Mervyn King (second round)

UK Qualifier
- (England) Jamie Hughes (semi-finals)
- (England) Steve Beaton (semi-finals)
- (England) Matthew Edgar (first round)
- (England) Stephen Bunting (first round)
- (England) Mark McGeeney (third round)
- (Wales) Robert Owen (first round)
- (England) Dave Prins (first round)
- (Northern Ireland) Gavin Carlin (second round)
- (England) Josh Payne (first round)
- (England) Keegan Brown (third round)
- (England) Nathan Aspinall (quarter-finals)
- (England) Chris Dobey (second round)
- (England) Ross Smith (second round)
- (England) James Richardson (third round)
- (England) Glen Durrant (first round)
- (England) Ryan Searle (third round)
- (Northern Ireland) Brendan Dolan (second round)

European Qualifier
- (Netherlands) Niels Zonneveld (second round)
- (Netherlands) Jeffrey de Zwaan (quarter-finals)
- (Poland) Krzysztof Ratajski (second round)
- (Belgium) Dimitri Van den Bergh (second round)
- (Netherlands) Vincent van der Voort (second round)
- (Latvia) Madars Razma (first round)

West/South European Qualifier
- (Switzerland) Stefan Bellmont (first round)
- (Austria) Michael Rasztovits (first round)

Host Nation Qualifier
- (Germany) Daniel Klose (first round)
- (Germany) Michael Hurtz (first round)
- (Germany) Dragutin Horvat (first round)
- (Germany) Ricardo Pietreczko (first round)
- (Germany) Michael Rosenauer (first round)

Nordic & Baltic Qualifier
- (Finland) Kim Viljanen (first round)

East European Qualifier
- (Croatia) Pero Ljubić (first round)

== Draw ==
First round (best of 11 legs); 10 May
(Northern Ireland) Brendan Dolan 94.94	6
(Germany) Michael Rosenauer 86.75	2
(England) Matthew Edgar 83.63	3
(England) James Richardson 95.94	6
(Netherlands) Niels Zonneveld 79.15	6
(Germany) Michael Hurtz 78.15	4
(Croatia) Pero Ljubić 84.00	3
(England) Ross Smith 92.30	6
(Germany) Ricardo Pietreczko 76.95	1
(England) Jamie Hughes 90.44	6
(England) Mark McGeeney 93.78	6
(England) Josh Payne 97.74	3
(England) Chris Dobey 103.66	6
(Latvia) Madars Razma 95.32	0
(Finland) Kim Viljanen 82.09	1
(England) Nathan Aspinall 102.97	6
(Germany) Dragutin Horvat 84.04	3
(Northern Ireland) Gavin Carlin 88.53	6
(Netherlands) Vincent van der Voort 91.47	6
(England) Dave Prins 90.70	4
(England) Steve Beaton 92.96	6
(England) Stephen Bunting 95.94	4
(England) Ryan Searle 91.48	6
(England) Glen Durrant 97.86	4
(Switzerland) Stefan Bellmont 82.82	2
(Netherlands) Jeffrey de Zwaan 97.81	6
(Wales) Robert Owen 91.22	4
(Poland) Krzysztof Ratajski 94.69	6
(Austria) Michael Rasztovits 90.98	1
(Belgium) Dimitri Van den Bergh 91.51	6
(Germany) Daniel Klose 84.41	3
(England) Keegan Brown 91.79	6

Second round (best of 11 legs); 11 May
1	(Netherlands) Michael van Gerwen 92.39	6
(Northern Ireland) Brendan Dolan 84.78	5
16	(England) Mervyn King 100.19	3
(England) James Richardson 102.19	6
8	(Scotland) Peter Wright 98.31	6
(Netherlands) Niels Zonneveld 86.28	4
9	(Wales) Jonny Clayton 88.95	6
(England) Ross Smith 88.01	4
5	(England) Adrian Lewis 96.54	3
(England) Jamie Hughes 103.97	6
12	(England) Joe Cullen 90.81	5
(England) Mark McGeeney 93.09	6
4	(Northern Ireland) Daryl Gurney 98.25	6
(England) Chris Dobey 93.06	5
13	(Germany) Max Hopp 93.98	3
(England) Nathan Aspinall 98.43	6
2	(Wales) Gerwyn Price 103.41	6
(Northern Ireland) Gavin Carlin 95.68	1
15	(England) Darren Webster 90.86	6
(Netherlands) Vincent van der Voort 91.21	5
7	(Austria) Mensur Suljović 95.20	5
(England) Steve Beaton 94.03	6
10	(England) James Wade	w/d
(England) Ryan Searle	w/o
6	(England) Rob Cross 89.55	3
(Netherlands) Jeffrey de Zwaan 90.24	6
11	(England) Michael Smith 97.52	6
(Poland) Krzysztof Ratajski 101.85	4
3	(England) Ian White 95.53	6
(Belgium) Dimitri Van den Bergh 95.14	5
14	(England) Ricky Evans 94.16	2
(England) Keegan Brown 95.50	6

Third round (best of 11 legs); 12 May
1	(Netherlands) van Gerwen 100.57	6
(England) Richardson 83.43	1
8	(Scotland) Wright 104.75	6
9	(Wales) Clayton 93.82	4
(England) Hughes 91.80	6
(England) McGeeney 86.43	4
4	(Northern Ireland) Gurney 101.93	4
(England) Aspinall 102.91	6
2	(Wales) Price 97.95	4
15	(England) Webster 92.62	6
(England) Beaton 89.22	6
(England) Searle 90.78	4
(Netherlands) de Zwaan 105.96	6
11	(England) M. Smith 98.54	4
3	(England) White 110.84	6
(England) Brown 107.04	3

Quarter-finals (best of 11 legs); 12 May
1	(Netherlands) van Gerwen 99.35	3
8	(Scotland) Wright 97.94	6
(England) Hughes 92.00	6
(England) Aspinall 90.23	5
15	(England) Webster 85.62	2
(England) Beaton 87.47	6
(Netherlands) de Zwaan 93.56	1
3	(England) White 97.07	6

Semi-finals (best of 13 legs); 12 May
8	(Scotland) Wright 98.97	7
(England) Hughes 89.58	1
(England) Beaton 90.39	5
3	(England) White 98.78	7

Final (best of 15 legs); 12 May
8	(Scotland) Wright 92.68	7
3	(England) White 91.36	8
