= Colin Fowler =

English darts player (born 1962)

Personal information
- Nickname: Robocol
- Born: 3 August 1962 (age 64) Blackpool, Lancashire, England
- Home town: Northfield, Birmingham, England

Sport
- Sport: Darts
- Playing since: 1987
- Darts: 23g Firefox
- Laterality: Right-handed
- Walk-on music: "Here I Go Again" by Whitesnake

Organisation (see split in darts)
- BDO: 1997–2012
- PDC: 2013–2017

WDF major events – best performances
- World Masters: Last 24: 2011

PDC premier events – best performances
- UK Open: Last 64: 2015

Other tournament wins
- Years
PDC Challenge Tour	2014 (×3), 2015
- Updated on 18 January 2019

Colin Fowler (born 3 August 1962) is an English former professional darts player who competed in British Darts Organisation (BDO) and Professional Darts Corporation (PDC) events.

== Career ==
Fowler reached the quarter-finals of a PDC event for the first time in his career at the opening UK Open Qualifier of 2013, where he lost 6–3 against Ronnie Baxter. He made his debut in the UK Open later in the year and was beaten 5–4 by Matt Padgett in the second round. In April 2014, Fowler won two Challenge Tour tournaments on the same day, winning a total of 14 consecutive matches and amassing £4,000 in prize money. He beat Mark Frost and Matt Clark in the two finals. Fowler also won the 15th event with a 6–3 victory over Dirk van Duijvenbode and finished third on the Challenge Tour Order of Merit, just £300 short of second place which would have seen him earn a two-year PDC tour card.

Fowler defeated Steve West 5–0 and Jason Wilson 5–3 at the 2015 UK Open, before losing 9–4 to David Pallett in the third round. He won the second Challenge Tour event of the year by beating Steve Maish 5–2. Fowler lost 5–3 to Rob Modra in the semi-finals of the second Challenge Tour of 2016.
