= Ryan Harrington =

English darts player

Personal information
- Nickname: "The Animal"
- Born: 19 August 1990 (age 36) London, England
- Home town: Chelmsford, Essex, England

Sport
- Sport: Darts
- Playing since: 2008
- Darts: 25 Gram
- Laterality: Right-handed
- Walk-on music: "Breakfast at Tiffany's" by Deep Blue Something

Organisation (see split in darts)
- PDC: 2010–

PDC premier events – best performances
- UK Open: Last 64: 2015, 2016, 2018
- Grand Slam: Last 16: 2019

Other tournament wins
- Years
PDC Development Tour England	2011

Ryan Harrington (born 19 August 1990) is an English professional darts player from Essex. He is the son of former darts player Rod Harrington.

== Career ==
Harrington qualified for the 2015 UK Open in 56th on the UK Open order of merit so started in the second round. He beat Matt Padgett 5–0 in the second round but lost 6–9 to Dave Chisnall in the third round. He qualified for the 2016 UK Open where he reached the last 64 again after wins over Glen McGrandle and Darron Brown, before losing to eventual winner Michael van Gerwen. Harrington got a Tour Card after he finished fourth in the UK Q School Order of Merit in January 2018.

In November 2019, he qualified for the 2019 Grand Slam of Darts. He reached the last 16 but lost 10-3 against Dave Chisnall.

== See also ==
- List of players with a 2018 PDC Tour Card
