= Eddie Dootson =

English darts player

Personal information
- Nickname: Popeye
- Born: August 23, 1961 (age 65) St Helens, Merseyside, England

Sport
- Sport: Darts
- Playing since: 1975
- Darts: Unicorn
- Laterality: Left-handed
- Walk-on music: Penny Arcade by Roy Orbison

Organisation (see split in darts)
- PDC: 2007–

PDC premier events – best performances
- UK Open: Last 16: 2015

Eddie Dootson (born 23 August 1961) is an English darts player who has competed in Professional Darts Corporation events.

In 2015, he reached the last 16 of the UK Open defeating Joe Cullen and Robert Thornton, before losing to Devon Petersen.
