= Michael Rasztovits =

Austrian darts player

Personal information
- Nickname: "Rasto"
- Born: 16 February 1984 (age 42) Oberpullendorf, Austria
- Home town: Oberpullendorf, Austria

Sport
- Sport: Darts
- Playing since: 2005
- Darts: 23g
- Laterality: Right-handed
- Walk-on music: "Freaks" by Timmy Trumpet and Savage

Organisation (see split in darts)
- PDC: 2011–

PDC premier events – best performances
- World Championship: Preliminary Round: 2016
- UK Open: Last 64: 2018

Other tournament wins
- Years
PDC World Qualifying	2015
Medal record
Men's Darts
Representing Austria
EDF European Ch'ship
Silver medal – second place	2021 Podčetrtek	Men's cricket

Michael Rasztovits (born 16 February 1984), nicknamed "Rasto", is an Austrian darts player.

== Career ==
Since 2011, Rasztovits has taken part in PDC events. He has played in Qualifying School from 2013 onwards but has never won enough games to win a PDC Tour Card. He took part in the 2014, 2015 and 2016 qualifiers for the UK Open but didn't manage to qualify.

Rasztovits qualified for the 2016 PDC World Darts Championship after defeating Boris Krčmar in the Final of the Eastern Europe Qualifier. He was beaten 2–0 by Rob Szabo in the preliminary round. He won a match at a European Tour event for the first time when he knocked out 1996 BDO world champion Steve Beaton 6–4 at the 2016 Gibraltar Darts Trophy. Rasztovits was defeated by a reversal of this scoreline in the second round by Kim Huybrechts.

== World Championship results ==
=== PDC ===
- 2016: Preliminary Round (lost to Rob Szabo 0–2)
