= Jeffrey de Zwaan =

Dutch darts player (born 1996)

Jeffrey De Zwaan
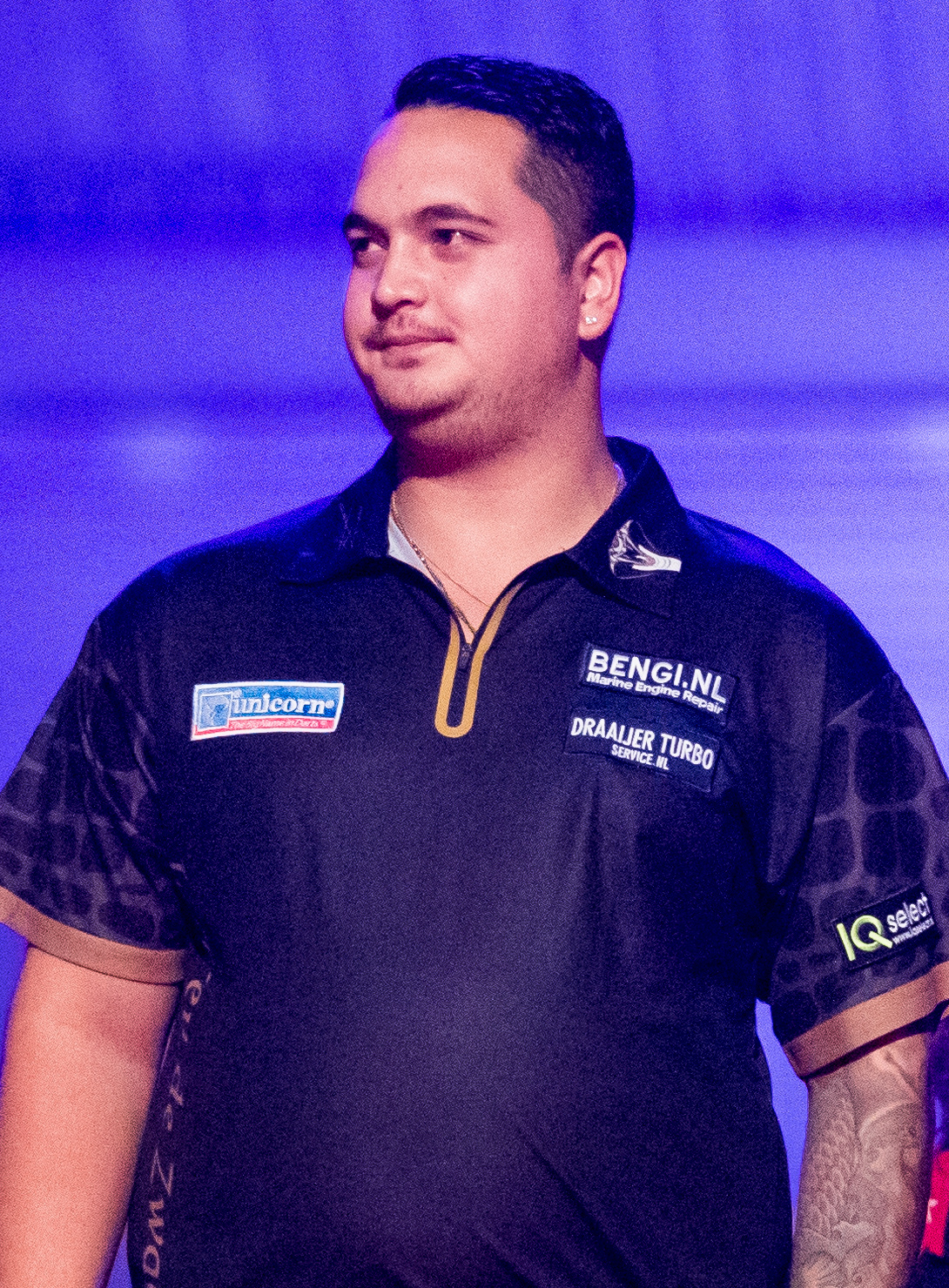
- De Zwaan in 2019

Personal information
- Full name: Jeffrey De Zwaan
- Nickname: "The Black Cobra"
- Born: 26 March 1996 (age 30) Rijswijk, Netherlands
- Home town: Leidschendam, Netherlands

Sport
- Sport: Darts
- Darts: 23g Unicorn
- Laterality: Right-handed
- Walk-on music: "Could You Be Loved" by Bob Marley

Organisation (see split in darts)
- BDO: 2011–2015
- PDC: 2015–present (Tour Card: 2015–2024; 2026–)
- Current world ranking: (PDC) 105 ▼3 (29 October 2026)

WDF major events – best performances
- World Masters: Last 16: 2014
- Finder Masters: Last 24 Group: 2013

PDC premier events – best performances
- World Championship: Last 16: 2020
- World Matchplay: Semi-final: 2018
- World Grand Prix: Quarter-final: 2020
- UK Open: Last 16: 2023
- Grand Slam: Group Stage: 2017
- European Championship: Quarter-final: 2019
- Premier League: Challenger: 2019, 2020
- PC Finals: Last 16: 2020
- Masters: Last 24: 2021
- World Series Finals: Last 24: 2019, 2021

Other tournament wins
- Years
Players Championships (x2)
2018, 2019
Youth events
World Youth Masters	2012
PDC Development Tour	2019

Jeffrey de Zwaan (born 26 March 1996) is a Dutch professional darts player who competes in Professional Darts Corporation (PDC) events. He has won 2 PDC ranking titles in Players Championship events. He reached his first major semi-final at the 2018 World Matchplay.

== Career ==
De Zwaan progressed through to the last 16 of the 2014 World Masters, where he lost to Glen Durrant 3–0. He won a two-year PDC Tour Card in 2015 by defeating Prakash Jiwa 5–1 in the final round.

De Zwaan played at the 2015 German Darts Championship, defeating Devon Petersen 6–2 in the first round before being whitewashed 6–0 by Adrian Lewis in round two. De Zwaan qualified for the 2015 UK Open, reaching the last 16 at the final qualifier. On his debut he lost 5–2 to Benito van de Pas in the second round. He eliminated Steve Brown, Michael Smith, Ken MacNeil and Jelle Klaasen to reach his first PDC quarter-final at Players Championship 4 and lost 6–3 to Lewis. De Zwaan qualified for the European Championship having been the lowest ranked of the seven European Qualifiers but lost 6–3 to world number one Michael van Gerwen in the opening round.

De Zwaan's first year on the PDC tour saw him finish high enough on the Pro Tour Order of Merit to qualify for the 2016 World Championship. His first round match against Michael Smith went to a sudden-death leg. Smith won the bull to throw first and defeated de Zwaan 4–3. He lost 6–5 in the second round of the UK Open to Alex Roy. He reached the last 32 of four Players Championship events and qualified for two European Tours, but was knocked out in the first round of both. De Zwaan reached the final of the 18th Development Tour event but was beaten 4–2 by Corey Cadby.

In the 2018 UK Open, he drew number one seed Michael van Gerwen and won the match 10–8, ultimately ending the World Number 1's unbeaten run in ITV major tournaments since November 2014. He lost 10–8 in the following round to Rileys qualifier Paul Hogan.

In April, de Zwaan won his first PDC ranking title by beating Jonny Clayton 6–5 in the final of Players Championship 10.

At the 2018 World Matchplay, he defeated Michael van Gerwen in the first round 10–6 in legs. This was his second victory over van Gerwen in a major event. This was considered a huge upset due to Michael van Gerwen being the current world number 1 and Jeffrey being the world number 68.

Following Gary Anderson's withdrawal from the 2019 Premier League, de Zwaan was selected as one of nine 'contenders' to replace him. He would play a one-off match against Rob Cross on night nine in Rotterdam.

In May 2019, de Zwaan won his second PDC ranking title by beating Stephen Bunting 8–2.

De Zwaan reached the fourth round of the 2020 PDC World Championship, where he played Peter Wright. Wright led 3–0 in sets and 2–0 in legs before de Zwaan mounted a comeback to level at 3–3 and lead by a break of throw in the deciding set, but Wright eventually won and went on to win the tournament. This was followed by another selection for one of the Premier League nights in Rotterdam, this time under the tag of 'Challenger'.

He lost his professional status at the end of 2022, having dropped outside the top 64 of the PDC Order of Merit. In January 2023 De Zwaan won his Tour card straight back at Q-School, winning the second day. He did so by becoming day-winner on third day of the final stage. At the 2023 UK Open in March, De Zwaan reached the last 32 with wins over Lukas Wenig, Geert Nentjes, James Wilson and Danny Jansen. In the last 32 De Zwaan defeated Gerwyn Price with a 105.20 average. In the last 16, he lost to Rob Cross.

In 2024 De Zwaan continued in his second year with Tour card and signed a multi-year contract with the company Unicorn. In the same time he continued battling with his injured shoulder and was forced to skip several tournaments due to a persistent bursitis problem. He also had to wear dentures due to losing his front teeth. He was only able to qualify for two European Tour events in 2024, being eliminated in the second round at both events. De Zwaan was one of four players to qualify for the 2025 PDC World Darts Championship through the Tour Card Holder qualifier. He lost 3–1 to Florian Hempel in the first round, resulting in him losing his Tour Card.

De Zwaan would regain his card on the final day at 2026 Q School.

== Personal life ==
De Zwaan is of Thai ancestry through his mother.

== World Championship results ==
=== PDC ===
- 2016: First round (lost to Michael Smith 2–3)
- 2019: Second round (lost to Rob Cross 1–3)
- 2020: Fourth round (lost to Peter Wright 3–4)
- 2021: Second round (lost to Ryan Searle 0–3)
- 2025: First round (lost to Florian Hempel 1–3)

== Performance timeline ==
=== BDO ===
Tournament	2013	2014
World Masters	DNP	6R
Zuiderduin Masters	RR	DNP

=== PDC ===
Tournament	2015	2016	2017	2018	2019	2020	2021	2022	2023	2024	2025	2026
World Championship	DNP	1R	DNQ		2R	4R	2R	Did not qualify			1R	DNQ
UK Open	2R	2R	1R	4R	4R	4R	4R	3R	6R	3R	DNQ	1R
World Matchplay	Did not qualify			SF	1R	1R	Did not qualify					
World Grand Prix	Did not qualify			2R	2R	QF	Did not qualify					
European Championship	1R	Did not qualify			QF	1R	Did not qualify					
Grand Slam	DNQ		RR	Did not qualify								
Players Championship Finals	DNQ		1R	2R	1R	3R	Did not qualify					
Non-ranked televised events
Masters	Did not qualify						1R	Did not qualify				Prel.
Premier League	Did not participate				C	C	Did not participate					
World Series Finals	Did not qualify				1R	DNQ	1R	Did not qualify				
World Youth Championship	QF	3R	QF	RR	QF	SF	Did not participate					
Career statistics
Year-end ranking	57	59	78	44	23	23	45	86	98	74	206	

==== European Tour ====
Season	1	2	3	4	5	6	7	8	9	10	11	12	13	14	15
2015	GDC; 2R	GDT; DNQ	GDM; 1R	DDM; 2R	IDO; 1R	Did not qualify			EDG; 2R						
2016	Did not qualify				ADO; 1R	EDO; DNQ	IDO; 1R	Did not qualify							
2017	Did not qualify				GDT; 1R	Did not qualify			DDM; 2R	GDG; DNQ	IDO; DNQ	EDT; 1R			
2018	EDO; 1R	Did not qualify						DDO; 1R	EDM; DNQ	GDC; DNQ	DDC; 1R	IDO; DNQ	EDT; 2R		
2019	EDO; 2R	GDC; DNQ	GDG; DNQ	GDO; 2R	ADO; 2R	EDG; QF	Did not qualify			ADC; 3R	EDM; 1R	IDO; 2R	GDT; 2R		
2022	IDO; DNQ	GDC; DNQ	GDG; 2R	ADO; 2R	EDO; DNQ	CDO; 1R	EDG; DNQ	DDC; DNQ	EDM; 3R	HDT; 3R	Did not qualify				
2023	Did not qualify			GDG; 2R	ADO; 1R	Did not qualify									
2024	BDO; DNQ	GDG; 2R	IDO; DNQ	EDG; DNQ	ADO; 2R	Did not qualify									
2026	PDO; DNQ	EDT; 1R	BDO; DNQ	GDG; DNQ	EDG; 2R	ADO; DNQ	IDO; DNQ	BDO; 1R	Did not qualify						DDC

==== Players Championships ====
Season	1	2	3	4	5	6	7	8	9	10	11	12	13	14	15	16	17	18	19	20	21	22	23	24	25	26	27	28	29	30	31	32	33	34
2015	BAR; 2R	BAR; 3R	BAR; 1R	BAR; QF	BAR; 3R	COV; 1R	COV; 2R	COV; 2R	CRA; 2R	CRA; 1R	BAR; 1R	BAR; 1R	WIG; 4R	WIG; 2R	BAR; 2R	BAR; 2R	DUB; 2R	DUB; 2R	COV; 1R	COV; 1R														
2016	BAR; 1R	BAR; 1R	BAR; 3R	BAR; 2R	BAR; 3R	BAR; DNP	BAR; DNP	COV; 1R	COV; 3R	BAR; 1R	BAR; 2R	BAR; 1R	BAR; 2R	BAR; 1R	BAR; 2R	BAR; 3R	DUB; 1R	DUB; 1R	BAR; 1R	BAR; 1R														
2017	BAR; 1R	BAR; 1R	BAR; 1R	BAR; 1R	MIL; 1R	MIL; 1R	BAR; 1R	BAR; 1R	WIG; 1R	WIG; 2R	MIL; DNP	MIL; DNP	WIG; 1R	WIG; QF	BAR; 2R	BAR; 2R	BAR; 2R	BAR; 1R	DUB; 2R	DUB; 2R	BAR; 4R	BAR; SF												
2018	BAR; 1R	BAR; 1R	BAR; 1R	BAR; F	MIL; 2R	MIL; 3R	BAR; SF	BAR; 1R	WIG; 2R	WIG; W	MIL; 3R	MIL; 4R	WIG; 2R	WIG; 1R	BAR; 1R	BAR; 1R	BAR; DNP	BAR; 3R	DUB; 2R	DUB; 3R	BAR; 2R	BAR; 3R												
2019	WIG; 4R	WIG; 3R	WIG; 3R	WIG; 2R	BAR; 1R	BAR; 2R	WIG; 4R	WIG; 1R	BAR; 1R	BAR; 2R	BAR; 1R	BAR; F	BAR; QF	BAR; W	BAR; 3R	BAR; 1R	WIG; 2R	WIG; 3R	BAR; 1R	BAR; 4R	HIL; 3R	HIL; 1R	BAR; 3R	BAR; 2R	BAR; 4R	BAR; 2R	DUB; 3R	DUB; 1R	BAR; 3R	BAR; 4R				
2020	BAR; 2R	BAR; 1R	WIG; SF	WIG; 1R	WIG; 1R	WIG; 1R	BAR; 2R	BAR; 1R	MIL; 2R	MIL; 1R	MIL; 1R	MIL; 3R	MIL; 2R	NIE; 3R	NIE; 1R	NIE; 3R	NIE; 1R	NIE; 1R	COV; 1R	COV; QF	COV; 2R	COV; 3R	COV; 1R											
2021	BOL; 1R	BOL; 2R	BOL; 1R	BOL; 1R	MIL; 1R	MIL; 2R	MIL; 1R	MIL; 1R	NIE; DNP	NIE; DNP	NIE; DNP	NIE; DNP	MIL; 1R	MIL; 1R	MIL; 3R	MIL; 1R	COV; 1R	COV; 4R	COV; 2R	COV; 1R	BAR; 1R	BAR; 1R	BAR; 2R	BAR; 1R	BAR; 1R	BAR; 3R	BAR; 2R	BAR; 1R	BAR; 1R	BAR; 1R				
2022	BAR; DNP	BAR; DNP	WIG; 1R	WIG; 1R	BAR; 4R	BAR; 1R	NIE; 1R	NIE; 1R	BAR; 2R	BAR; 1R	BAR; 3R	BAR; 1R	BAR; 1R	WIG; 1R	WIG; 1R	NIE; 2R	NIE; 2R	BAR; 2R	BAR; 2R	BAR; 1R	BAR; 2R	BAR; 3R	BAR; 1R	BAR; 1R	BAR; 2R	BAR; 3R	BAR; 3R	BAR; 1R	BAR; 2R	BAR; 1R				
2023	BAR; 2R	BAR; 1R	BAR; 3R	BAR; 2R	BAR; 4R	BAR; 1R	HIL; 1R	HIL; DNP	WIG; 1R	WIG; 2R	LEI; 1R	LEI; 1R	HIL; 1R	HIL; 3R	LEI; 2R	LEI; 2R	HIL; 1R	HIL; QF	BAR; 1R	BAR; 1R	BAR; 1R	BAR; 2R	BAR; 1R	BAR; 1R	BAR; 2R	BAR; 1R	BAR; 1R	BAR; 1R	BAR; 3R	BAR; 2R				
2024	WIG; 1R	WIG; 1R	LEI; 1R	LEI; 2R	HIL; 4R	HIL; 1R	LEI; 1R	LEI; 2R	HIL; 1R	HIL; 1R	HIL; 2R	HIL; 1R	MIL; 3R	MIL; 2R	MIL; 3R	MIL; 3R	MIL; 1R	MIL; 1R	MIL; 1R	WIG; 1R	WIG; 3R	LEI; DNP	LEI; DNP	WIG; 2R	WIG; 2R	WIG; 3R	WIG; 1R	WIG; 1R	LEI; 1R	LEI; 1R				
2026	HIL; 1R	HIL; 1R	WIG; 3R	WIG; 1R	LEI; 2R	LEI; 1R	LEI; 1R	LEI; 1R	WIG; 2R	WIG; 3R	MIL; 1R	MIL; 1R	HIL; 2R	HIL; 1R	LEI; 1R	LEI; 1R	LEI; 1R	LEI; 2R	MIL; 1R	MIL; 1R	WIG; 2R	WIG; 1R	LEI; 1R	LEI; 4R	HIL; 2R	HIL; 1R	LEI; 1R	LEI; 2R	ROS; 2R	ROS; 4R	ROS; 1R	ROS; 1R	LEI; 4R	LEI; 2R

Performance Table Legend
W	Won the tournament	F	Finalist	SF	Semifinalist	QF	Quarterfinalist	#R; RR; Prel.	Lost in # round Round-robin; Preliminary round	DQ	Disqualified
DNQ	Did not qualify	DNP	Did not participate	WD	Withdrew	NH	Tournament not held	#R; RR; Prel.	Lost in # round Round-robin; Preliminary round	NYF	Not yet founded
