= David Pallett =

English darts player (born 1990)

Personal information
- Full name: David John Pallett
- Born: 8 February 1990 (age 36) Newport, Shropshire, England

Sport
- Sport: Darts
- Playing since: 2000
- Darts: 20g Bull's Germany Signature
- Laterality: Right-handed
- Walk-on music: "Parklife" by Blur

Organisation (see split in darts)
- BDO: 2005–2012
- PDC: 2013–
- WDF: 2005–2012, 2021–
- Current world ranking: (WDF) 89 ▼9 (17 August 2026)

WDF major events – best performances
- World Championship: Last 48: 2023
- World Masters: Last 32: 2012

PDC premier events – best performances
- World Championship: Last 32: 2016
- UK Open: Semi-final: 2018

Other tournament wins
- Years
Coventry Open	2014
England Classic	2025
England Open	2022
Helvetia Open	2025
PDC Challenge Tour	2022
Romanian Classic	2025

David John Pallett (born 8 February 1990) is an English professional darts player who competes in Professional Darts Corporation (PDC) and World Darts Federation (WDF) events.

== Career ==
In January 2013, Pallett entered PDC Q School and stood just one match from joining the tour in the second event, but lost 6–5 to Louis Blundell. However, after all four events had been played, he had done enough through the Q School Order of Merit to earn a two-year PDC tour card. Pallett qualified for the first European Tour event of the year, the UK Masters and beat top 20 player Paul Nicholson 6–3 in the opening round before losing by a reverse of this scoreline to two-time world champion Adrian Lewis in the second round. He reached the last 16 of a PDC event for the first time in June at the fifth Players Championship where he was beaten 6–3 by Terry Jenkins. At the Dutch Darts Masters, he saw off established players Mark Walsh and Dave Chisnall, before Brendan Dolan eliminated Pallett in the third round.

In the beginning of the 2014 season, Pallett threw a nine-dart finish at the third UK Open Qualifier. He entered the UK Open itself at the second round stage and defeated Gary Spedding and Kevin McDine to reach the last 32 where Gary Anderson won 9–5. Pallett defeated Jamie Lewis and Andy Hamilton at the German Darts Masters, before reigning world champion Michael van Gerwen eliminated him 6–4 in the third round. Two more last 16 appearances in Players Championship events followed which contributed to Pallett earning £11,750 during the year on the Pro Tour Order of Merit, which saw him make his debut at the 2015 World Championship by taking the 11th of 16 places that were on offer to non-qualified players. Pallett played two-time winner of the event Adrian Lewis in the first round and took out a 161 finish in the first leg, but lost each set by three legs to one in a 3–0 defeat. He moved to world number 48 after the event.

At the 2015 UK Open, Pallett defeated Mark Dudbridge, Andy Smith and Colin Fowler to play in the fourth round of the event for the second year in a row. He faced Phil Taylor and was beaten 9–3. In September, Pallett averaged over 100 in knocking out both Jamie Caven (100.73) and Jelle Klaasen (104.83) at the European Darts Matchplay. His run continued with 6–5 wins over Alan Norris and Kim Huybrechts to reach the semi-finals of a PDC event for the first time, where he lost 6–3 to Dave Chisnall. This result was a huge factor in Pallett qualifying for his second successive World Championship, where he will play Huybrechts in the first round.

Pallett missed two darts to take a 2–1 set lead over Kim Huybrechts in the first round of the 2016 World Championship. However, after Huybrehcts took the opening leg of the fourth set, Pallett reeled off six straight legs to win 3–2, which included 132 and 122 finishes in the last two games. In the second round both Pallett and Mensur Suljović missed darts at doubles for nine-dart finishes. There was never more than a set between the players, with Suljović taking the final set by three legs to one. He reached the quarter-finals of the first UK Open Qualifier and lost 6–2 to Phil Taylor. His third round match with Raymond van Barneveld at the UK Open went to a deciding leg in which the Dutchman threw an 11 darter to win 9–8. It was a tough rest of the year for Pallett, but he did reach the last 16 twice towards the end of it, losing 6–3 to Steve West at the 18th Players Championship event and 6–4 to Mensur Suljović at the German Darts Championship.

Pallett regained his PDC Tour Card in January 2019 via the Order of Merit, sealing at least two years on the ProTour.

== World Championship results ==
=== PDC World Championship ===
- 2015: First round (lost to Adrian Lewis 0–3)
- 2016: Second round (lost to Mensur Suljović 3–4)

=== WDF World Championship ===
- 2023: First round (lost to Thomas Junghans 0–2)

== Performance timeline ==
=== BDO ===
Tournament	2011	2012
BDO Ranked televised events
World Masters	2R	5R

=== WDF ===
Tournament	2023	2025
WDF Ranked major/platinum events
World Championship	1R	WD
World Masters	NH	5R

=== PDC ===
Tournament	2012	2014	2015	2016	2017	2018	2019	2020
PDC Ranked televised events
World Championship	DNQ		1R	2R	Did not qualify			
UK Open	Prel.	4R	4R	3R	4R	SF	1R	2R

==== Players Championships ====
Season	1	2	3	4	5	6	7	8	9	10	11	12	13	14	15	16	17	18	19	20	21	22	23	24	25	26	27	28	29	30	31	32	33	34
2018	Did not participate														BAR; 2R	BAR; 1R	BAR; 1R	BAR; 1R	DNP			BAR; 2R												
2019	WIG; 1R	WIG; 1R	WIG; 1R	WIG; 1R	BAR; 2R	BAR; 4R	WIG; 1R	WIG; 1R	BAR; 1R	BAR; 1R	BAR; 3R	BAR; 1R	BAR; 1R	BAR; 1R	BAR; 4R	BAR; 1R	WIG; 1R	WIG; 1R	BAR; 1R	BAR; 1R	HIL; 2R	HIL; 1R	BAR; 2R	BAR; 2R	BAR; DNP		DUB; 3R	DUB; 2R	BAR; 1R	BAR; 1R				
2020	BAR; 1R	BAR; 1R	WIG; 2R	WIG; 3R	WIG; 1R	WIG; 1R	BAR; 1R	BAR; 1R	MIL; 1R	MIL; 1R	MIL; 1R	MIL; 1R	MIL; 1R	NIE; 1R	NIE; 2R	NIE; 1R	NIE; 1R	NIE; 1R	COV; 1R	COV; 1R	COV; 2R	COV; 1R	COV; 1R											
2022	Did not participate																					BAR; 4R	BAR; 2R	Did not participate										
2025	Did not participate																															WIG; 1R	WIG; DNP	

Performance Table Legend
W	Won the tournament	F	Finalist	SF	Semifinalist	QF	Quarterfinalist	#R; RR; Prel.	Lost in # round Round-robin; Preliminary round	DQ	Disqualified
DNQ	Did not qualify	DNP	Did not participate	WD	Withdrew	NH	Tournament not held	#R; RR; Prel.	Lost in # round Round-robin; Preliminary round	NYF	Not yet founded
