= 2017 UK Open =

2017 Coral UK Open

Tournament information
- Dates: 3–5 March 2017
- Venue: Butlin's Minehead
- Location: Minehead, England
- Organisation(s): Professional Darts Corporation (PDC)
- Format: Legs; Final – best of 21
- Prize fund: £350,000
- Winner's share: £70,000
- High checkout: 167; Daryl Gurney; Kim Huybrechts

Champion(s)
- (Scotland) Peter Wright

The 2017 Coral UK Open was a darts tournament staged by the Professional Darts Corporation. It was the fifteenth year of the tournament where, following numerous regional qualifying heats throughout Britain, players competing in a single elimination tournament to be crowned champion. The tournament was held for the fourth time at the Butlin's Resort in Minehead, England, from 3 to 5 March 2017, and has the nickname, "the FA Cup of darts" as a random draw will be staged after each round until the final.

Michael van Gerwen was the two-time defending champion, but withdrew on the morning of the event with a back injury. Two-time runner-up and top seed Peter Wright won his first PDC major, defeating Gerwyn Price 11–6 in the final.

== Format and qualifiers ==
=== UK Open qualifiers ===
There are six qualifying events staged in February 2017 to determine the UK Open Order of Merit Table. The tournament winners are:

No.	Date	Venue	Winner	Score	Runner-up	Ref.
1	Friday 3 February	Robin Park Tennis Centre, Wigan	Peter Wright (Scotland)	6–4	(England) Adrian Lewis	
2	Saturday 4 February	Robin Park Tennis Centre, Wigan	Simon Whitlock (Australia)	6–4	(Scotland) Gary Anderson	
3	Sunday 5 February	Robin Park Tennis Centre, Wigan	Peter Wright (Scotland)	6–5	(England) Michael Smith	
4	Friday 10 February	Robin Park Tennis Centre, Wigan	Michael van Gerwen (Netherlands)	6–3	(Scotland) Gary Anderson	
5	Saturday 11 February	Robin Park Tennis Centre, Wigan	Simon Whitlock (Australia)	6–3	(Belgium) Ronny Huybrechts	
6	Sunday 12 February	Robin Park Tennis Centre, Wigan	Peter Wright (Scotland)	6–3	(England) James Wade	

The tournament is featuring 128 players. The results of the six qualifiers shown above were collated into the UK Open Order Of Merit. The top 32 players in the Order of Merit received a place at the final tournament. In addition, the next 64 players (without ties in this year's edition) in the Order of Merit list qualified for the tournament, but started in the earlier rounds played on the Friday. A further 32 players qualify via regional qualifying tournaments.

=== Top 32 in Order of Merit (receiving byes into third round) ===
1. (Scotland) Peter Wright
2. (Australia) Simon Whitlock
3. (Netherlands) ~~Michael van Gerwen~~*
4. (Scotland) Gary Anderson
5. (England) Michael Smith
6. (England) James Wade
7. (England) Ian White
8. (England) Adrian Lewis
9. (Netherlands) Raymond van Barneveld
10. (England) Mervyn King
11. (England) Steve Beaton
12. (England) Dave Chisnall
13. (Netherlands) Jelle Klaasen
14. (Netherlands) Benito van de Pas
15. (England) Rob Cross
16. (Wales) Gerwyn Price
17. (England) Darren Webster
18. (Belgium) Kim Huybrechts
19. (Belgium) Ronny Huybrechts
20. (England) Alan Norris
21. (Northern Ireland) Brendan Dolan
22. (Scotland) John Henderson
23. (Australia) Kyle Anderson
24. (England) Kevin Painter
25. (Spain) Cristo Reyes
26. (Netherlands) Christian Kist
27. (England) Chris Quantock
28. (England) Chris Dobey
29. (England) Ricky Evans
30. (England) Joe Cullen
31. (England) Mick Todd
32. (England) Ryan Searle

*Michael van Gerwen withdrew on March 3 due to a back injury and was not replaced; the last player drawn in the third round got a bye.

=== Number 33–64 of the Order of Merit (receiving byes into second round) ===
33. (England) Stephen Bunting
34. (England) Richard North
35. (Wales) Mark Webster
36. (Republic of Ireland) William O'Connor
37. (Scotland) Robert Thornton
38. (Northern Ireland) Daryl Gurney
39. (England) Ryan Palmer
40. (England) Peter Hudson
41. (Netherlands) Vincent van der Voort
42. (England) Stuart Kellett
43. (Republic of Ireland) Mick McGowan
44. (England) Scott Taylor
45. (England) Andy Jenkins
46. (England) Andrew Gilding
47. (England) David Pallett
48. (Austria) Zoran Lerchbacher
49. (Netherlands) Dirk van Duijvenbode
50. (Wales) Jamie Lewis
51. (Wales) Barrie Bates
52. (Netherlands) Jeffrey de Graaf
53. (Republic of Ireland) Steve Lennon
54. (Netherlands) Jan Dekker
55. (Greece) John Michael
56. (Scotland) Mark Barilli
57. (England) Ted Evetts
58. (England) Terry Jenkins
59. (England) Matthew Dennant
60. (South Africa) Devon Petersen
61. (England) Kirk Shepherd
62. (England) Justin Pipe
63. (England) Ross Twell
64. (England) Martin Lukeman

=== Number 65–96 of the Order of Merit qualifiers (starting in first round) ===
65. (Hong Kong) Kai Fan Leung
66. (Netherlands) Jermaine Wattimena
67. (England) Rob Hewson
68. (England) Darren Johnson
69. (Netherlands) Vincent Kamphuis
70. (Netherlands) Yordi Meeuwisse
71. (England) Tony Newell
72. (Hong Kong) Royden Lam
73. (England) Matt Padgett
74. (England) Keegan Brown
75. (Netherlands) Jeffrey de Zwaan
76. (Netherlands) Ron Meulenkamp
77. (Scotland) Ryan Murray
78. (England) Ritchie Edhouse
79. (England) Paul Rowley
80. (England) Alan Tabern
81. (Spain) Antonio Alcinas
82. (England) Ronnie Baxter
83. (England) Jamie Caven
84. (Wales) Jonny Clayton
85. (England) Joe Davis
86. (England) Paul Harvey
87. (England) Ryan Meikle
88. (England) James Richardson
89. (England) James Wilson
90. (England) Brian Woods
91. (England) Wayne Jones
92. (Scotland) Jamie Bain
93. (England) Lee Bryant
94. (England) Mark Frost
95. (Wales) Jonathan Worsley
96. (England) Paul Milford

=== Riley qualifiers (starting in first round) ===
32 amateur players qualified from Riley qualifiers held across the UK.

- (England) Lee Evans
- (England) Dan Read
- (England) Steve Maish
- (England) Dave Prins
- (England) Gary Eastwood
- (Wales) Gareth Pass
- (England) Neil Smith
- (England) Ben Green
- (England) Wayne Morris
- (England) Alex Roy
- (England) James Carroll
- (England) Kevin Edwards
- (England) Nicky Bell
- (England) Brandon Walsh
- (England) Paul Hogan
- (England) Scott Robertson
- (Scotland) Jimmy McKirdy
- (England) Paul Cartwright
- (England) Paul Barham
- (England) Brian Dawson
- (England) Johnny Haines
- (England) Andy Roberts
- (England) Martin Biggs
- (England) Dave Parletti
- (England) Darryl Pilgrim
- (England) John Ferrell
- (Wales) Mark Layton
- (England) Brett Claydon
- (Scotland) Andrew Davidson
- (England) Damian Smith
- (England) Kevin Bambrick
- (Wales) Dean Reynolds

== Prize money ==
The prize fund increased from last year's edition prize fund to £350,000.

Stage (no. of players)		Prize money (Total: £350,000)
Winner	(1)	£70,000
Runner-up	(1)	£35,000
Semi-finalists	(2)	£17,500
Quarter-finalists	(4)	£11,500
Last 16 (fifth round)	(8)	£6,500
Last 32 (fourth round)	(16)	£3,500
Last 64 (third round)	(32)	£1,750
Last 96 (second round)	(32)	n/a
Last 128 (first round)	(32)	n/a

== Draw ==
=== Friday 3 March ===
==== First round (best of eleven legs) ====
Player	Score	Player	Player	Score	Player
(Scotland) Ryan Murray	6 – 5	(England) John Ferrell (Q)	(England) Alan Tabern	6 – 4	(England) Scott Robertson (Q)
(England) Johnny Haines (Q)	6 – 0	(England) Wayne Morris (Q)	(England) Jamie Caven	6 – 3	(England) Dan Read (Q)
(England) Ritchie Edhouse	4 – 6	(England) Rob Hewson	(England) Joe Davis	6 – 2	(England) Paul Harvey
(England) Keegan Brown	3 – 6	(England) Paul Hogan (Q)	(England) Wayne Jones	6 – 5	(England) Lee Bryant
(England) Mark Frost	6 – 4	(Scotland) Jamie Bain	(England) Brett Claydon (Q)	4 – 6	(England) Paul Barham (Q)
(England) James Carroll (Q)	6 – 3	(England) Brandon Walsh (Q)	(England) Alex Roy (Q)	6 – 1	(England) Kevin Edwards (Q)
(England) Darren Johnson	6 – 5	(Netherlands) Jeffrey de Zwaan	(England) James Wilson	6 – 4	(England) Gary Eastwood (Q)
(Spain) Antonio Alcinas	4 – 6	(England) James Richardson	(Netherlands) Ron Meulenkamp	6 – 1	(Hong Kong) Royden Lam
(Netherlands) Yordi Meeuwisse	6 – 4	(England) Martin Biggs (Q)	(England) Paul Milford	6 – 3	(England) Brian Dawson (Q)
(England) Tony Newell	6 – 4	(Wales) Mark Layton (Q)	(England) Matt Padgett	6 – 2	(England) Paul Cartwright (Q)
(England) Paul Rowley	5 – 6	(England) Ronnie Baxter	(Wales) Jonny Clayton	6 – 1	(Scotland) Jimmy McKirdy (Q)
(Netherlands) Jermaine Wattimena	6 – 1	(Hong Kong) Kai Fan Leung	(England) Kevin Bambrick (Q)	6 – 5	(England) Nicky Bell (Q)
(England) Darryl Pilgrim (Q)	4 – 6	(England) Ben Green (Q)	(England) Lee Evans (Q)	6 – 5	(Scotland) Andrew Davidson (Q)
(Wales) Dean Reynolds (Q)	6 – 2	(England) Andy Roberts (Q)	(Wales) Jonathan Worsley	6 – 4	(England) Dave Prins (Q)
(England) Brian Woods	6 – 3	(England) Damian Smith (Q)	(England) Steve Maish (Q)	4 – 6	(England) Neil Smith (Q)
(Netherlands) Vincent Kamphuis	3 – 6	(England) Ryan Meikle	(England) Dave Parletti (Q)	6 – 2	(Wales) Gareth Pass (Q)

==== Second round (best of eleven legs) ====
Player	Score	Player	Player	Score	Player
(Wales) Jamie Lewis	4 – 6	(England) Paul Hogan (Q)	(England) Scott Taylor	5 – 6	(England) Paul Barham (Q)
(Northern Ireland) Daryl Gurney	6 – 3	(England) Ryan Palmer	(Netherlands) Ron Meulenkamp	6 – 4	(England) Lee Evans (Q)
(South Africa) Devon Petersen	2 – 6	(Netherlands) Jermaine Wattimena	(Netherlands) Jan Dekker	5 – 6	(England) Rob Hewson
(England) Ted Evetts	6 – 3	(England) Paul Milford	(Austria) Zoran Lerchbacher	4 – 6	(England) Matthew Dennant
(England) Tony Newell	4 – 6	(England) Brian Woods	(England) Alan Tabern	6 – 3	(England) James Carroll (Q)
(England) Jamie Caven	6 – 0	(England) Ben Green (Q)	(Netherlands) Yordi Meeuwisse	6 – 4	(Wales) Jonathan Worsley
(Netherlands) Vincent van der Voort	6 – 5	(England) James Wilson	(England) Justin Pipe	6 – 0	(England) Ryan Meikle
(England) Andy Jenkins	4 – 6	(England) David Pallett	(Republic of Ireland) William O'Connor	6 – 2	(Republic of Ireland) Steve Lennon
(England) Ross Twell	6 – 4	(England) Joe Davis	(England) Martin Lukeman	6 – 5	(England) Matt Padgett
(Scotland) Mark Barilli	3 – 6	(England) Kirk Shepherd	(England) Peter Hudson	5 – 6	(Greece) John Michael
(England) Terry Jenkins	2 – 6	(England) Wayne Jones	(England) James Richardson	6 – 1	(England) Neil Smith (Q)
(England) Stephen Bunting	2 – 6	(Wales) Mark Webster	(England) Andrew Gilding	6 – 4	(Scotland) Ryan Murray
(England) Alex Roy (Q)	6 – 4	(England) Dave Parletti (Q)	(England) Richard North	3 – 6	(England) Ronnie Baxter
(Wales) Jonny Clayton	6 – 3	(England) Mark Frost	(Scotland) Robert Thornton	6 – 0	(England) Kevin Bambrick (Q)
(Republic of Ireland) Mick McGowan	6 – 4	(Wales) Dean Reynolds (Q)	(Netherlands) Jeffrey de Graaf	3 – 6	(Wales) Barrie Bates
(England) Stuart Kellett	4 – 6	(Netherlands) Dirk van Duijvenbode	(England) Darren Johnson	3 – 6	(England) Johnny Haines (Q)

==== Third round (best of nineteen legs) ====
Player	Score	Player	Player	Score	Player
(England) Mick Todd	3 – 10	(Republic of Ireland) William O'Connor	(England) Darren Webster	8 – 10	(England) Ronnie Baxter
(England) Alan Norris	10 – 2	(Netherlands) Yordi Meeuwisse	(Scotland) Peter Wright	10 – 3	(England) James Richardson
(Belgium) Kim Huybrechts	10 – 8	(England) Brian Woods	(England) Mervyn King	7 – 10	(England) Alan Tabern
(Wales) Mark Webster	10 – 9	(England) Ross Twell	(England) Joe Cullen	10 – 2	(Scotland) Robert Thornton
(Australia) Kyle Anderson	7 – 10	(Netherlands) Jermaine Wattimena	(England) Dave Chisnall	10 – 4	(England) Jamie Caven
(England) Kevin Painter	8 – 10	(England) Chris Dobey	(Australia) Simon Whitlock	10 – 2	(England) Chris Quantock
(Northern Ireland) Daryl Gurney	10 – 2	(England) Alex Roy (Q)	(Netherlands) Jelle Klaasen	10 – 7	(Wales) Jonny Clayton
(England) Martin Lukeman	10 – 9	(England) Rob Hewson	(Northern Ireland) Brendan Dolan	9 – 10	(Greece) John Michael
(Scotland) Gary Anderson	9 – 10	(England) Paul Hogan(Q)	(Netherlands) Benito van de Pas	10 – 6	(England) Matthew Dennant
(Wales) Gerwyn Price	10 – 5	(England) Justin Pipe	(England) Ryan Searle	10 – 7	(Republic of Ireland) Mick McGowan
(Belgium) Ronny Huybrechts	4 – 10	(Netherlands) Vincent van der Voort	(England) Steve Beaton	6 – 10	(England) David Pallett
(England) Kirk Shepherd	10 – 8	(England) Wayne Jones	(England) Andrew Gilding	5 – 10	(England) Ted Evetts
(England) Ricky Evans	7 – 10	(Netherlands) Ron Meulenkamp	(England) James Wade	8 – 10	(England) Adrian Lewis
(Netherlands) Christian Kist	5 – 10	(Netherlands) Dirk van Duijvenbode	(England) Ian White	10 – 2	(England) Paul Barham (Q)
(England) Michael Smith	10 – 4	(Scotland) John Henderson	(England) Rob Cross	10 – 5	(England) Johnny Haines (Q)
(Netherlands) Raymond van Barneveld	10 – 6	(Wales) Barrie Bates	(Netherlands) ~~Michael van Gerwen~~ (withdrew)	w/o	(Spain) Cristo Reyes

=== Saturday 4 March ===
==== Fourth round (best of nineteen legs) ====
Player	Score	Player	Player	Score	Player
(Netherlands) Benito van de Pas	5 – 10	(England) Alan Norris	(Australia) Simon Whitlock	10 – 6	(Netherlands) Dirk van Duijvenbode
(Netherlands) Jelle Klaasen	9 – 10	(Netherlands) Vincent van der Voort	(England) Rob Cross	10 – 5	(England) Ryan Searle
(Scotland) Peter Wright	10 – 5	(England) Dave Chisnall	(England) Adrian Lewis	6 – 10	(England) Paul Hogan (Q)
(England) Chris Dobey	5 – 10	(England) Martin Lukeman	(England) Michael Smith	10 – 8	(Netherlands) Jermaine Wattimena
(Wales) Gerwyn Price	10 – 4	(England) David Pallett	(Spain) Cristo Reyes	5 – 10	(England) Joe Cullen
(Belgium) Kim Huybrechts	10 – 1	(England) Ted Evetts	(Republic of Ireland) William O'Connor	10 – 6	(England) Ronnie Baxter
(Netherlands) Raymond van Barneveld	10 – 3	(Netherlands) Ron Meulenkamp	(Northern Ireland) Daryl Gurney	10 – 3	(Wales) Mark Webster
(Greece) John Michael	6 – 10	(England) Alan Tabern	(England) Ian White	10 – 7	(England) Kirk Shepherd

==== Fifth round (best of nineteen legs) ====
Player	Score	Player
(Wales) Gerwyn Price 101.26	10 – 6	(England) Paul Hogan (Q) 99.60
(Netherlands) Raymond van Barneveld 96.52	10 – 7	(England) Alan Tabern 88.28
(England) Ian White 91.22	10 – 3	(England) Martin Lukeman 86.89
(England) Michael Smith 93.26	6 – 10	(England) Alan Norris 94.89
(Belgium) Kim Huybrechts 97.14	10 – 9	(England) Joe Cullen 96.42
(Australia) Simon Whitlock 94.80	10 – 7	(Republic of Ireland) William O'Connor 93.70
(Northern Ireland) Daryl Gurney 92.07	10 – 5	(Netherlands) Vincent van der Voort 94.51
(Scotland) Peter Wright 101.33	10 – 6	(England) Rob Cross 99.11

=== Sunday 5 March ===
==== Quarter-finals (best of nineteen legs) ====
Player	Score	Player
(Belgium) Kim Huybrechts 98.94	9 – 10	(England) Alan Norris 97.78
(England) Ian White 103.09	9 – 10	(Wales) Gerwyn Price 97.18
(Australia) Simon Whitlock 96.37	9 – 10	(Northern Ireland) Daryl Gurney 102.03
(Scotland) Peter Wright 110.88	10 – 8	(Netherlands) Raymond van Barneveld 108.10

==== Semi-finals and Final (best of twenty-one legs) ====
Semi-finals (best of 21 legs)
(Wales) Gerwyn Price 95.97	11
(England) Alan Norris 93.25	9
(Scotland) Peter Wright 100.77	11
(Northern Ireland) Daryl Gurney 98.89	5

Final (best of 21 legs)
(Wales) Gerwyn Price 97.78	6
(Scotland) Peter Wright 100.55	11
