= John Ferrell (darts player) =

English darts player

Personal information
- Nickname: "The Joker"
- Born: 28 February 1961 (age 65) Lewisham, London, England
- Home town: Lewisham, London, England

Sport
- Sport: Darts
- Playing since: 1983
- Darts: 22g Unicorn Signature
- Laterality: Left-handed
- Walk-on music: "Mission: Impossible" by Adam Clayton and Larry Mullen Jr.

Organisation (see split in darts)
- BDO: 1994–1997, 2001–2002
- PDC: 1997–2000, 2003–2017

WDF major events – best performances
- World Championship: Last 32: 2002
- World Masters: Last 128: 2001

PDC premier events – best performances
- World Championship: Quarter-Finals: 1999
- World Matchplay: Last 16: 1998
- World Grand Prix: Last 16: 1999
- UK Open: Last 64: 2008, 2015
- Desert Classic: Last 32: 2007
- US Open/WSoD: Last 128: 2007

Other tournament wins
- Years
England GP Of Darts Brighton	2012
England GP Of Darts Thanet	2012
Gibraltar Open	2009, 2015

John Ferrell (born 28 February 1961) is an English former professional darts player who played in both Professional Darts Corporation (PDC) and British Darts Organisation (BDO) events.

== Career ==
Ferrell's first foray in a major tournament was reaching the quarter-final in the 1994 BDO British Open, before switching to the PDC and making his televised debut in the 1997 World Matchplay, where he would reach the last 32, losing to Drew O'Neill. He would also compete in his first PDC World Championship later that year, although he would go out in the group stages.

1998, however, would prove to be his most successful year on the PDC circuit. A return to the Matchplay saw him reach the last 16 (losing to eventual finalist Ronnie Baxter), before making a surprise run to the quarter-finals of the World Championship, causing a shock by defeating perpetual finalist Dennis Priestley along the way. In fact, Ferrell would prove to be something of a bogeyman for Priestley in televised tournaments over that calendar year, knocking him out of both the Matchplay and the World Championship. He would eventually be knocked out by Alan-Warriner Little.

A solid year saw him reach the world's top sixteen, meaning he competed in his first (and only) World Grand Prix in 1999, going out in the group stages. Similarly, he never quite hit the same heights in majors again, achieving only last 32 berths in both the World Championship and World Matchplay in 2000 before deciding to switch back to the BDO, qualifying for the 2001 World Masters but losing in the second round to Co Stompe.

He would then win through qualifiers to appear in the 2002 BDO World Championship, but lost 3-0 in the first round to Bob Taylor. That would end his brief flirtation with the 'other side' of the darting divide, and he returned to the PDC in 2003, qualifying for that year's UK Open where he lost in the opening round. Sporadic appearances in darts events followed, including a second-round exit at the PDC US Open in 2007, before a run of form that summer saw him qualify for the 2007 Las Vegas Desert Classic, where he lost in the first round to Wayne Mardle.

Ferrell would lead something of a nomadic darting existence following this - he qualified for three more major PDC events: the UK Open in 2008, 2015, and 2017 respectively (making his best runs in the tournament with last 64 berths in 2008 and 2015), while also qualifying for the World Masters of the BDO in 2009 and 2015, although failing to make a dent in either tournament. He would frequently attempt to win a PDC Tour Card at Q School, attempting to do so in 2011 and 2014 (as well as playing the opening events of the Challenge Tour in 2014), but failed to make an impact. He did, however, win some tour events over that period, winning the Gibraltar Open on two occasions and picking up a pair of England Grand Prix Of Darts titles.

His last event to date was the UK Open in 2017.

== Personal life ==
Outside of darts, Ferrell worked as a taxi driver.

== World Championship performances ==
=== BDO ===
- 2002: Last 32: (lost to Bob Taylor 0–3)

=== PDC ===
- 1998: Last 24 Group: (lost to Jamie Harvey 0–3 & lost to Rod Harrington 0–3)
- 1999: Quarter-Finals: (lost to Alan Warriner-Little 1–4)
- 2000: Last 32: (lost to John Part 0–3)
