= 2013 Dutch Darts Masters =

Tournament information
- Dates: 25–27 October 2013
- Venue: Koningshof Hotel
- Location: Veldhoven
- Country: Netherlands
- Organisation(s): PDC
- Format: Legs
- Prize fund: £100,000
- Winner's share: £20,000

Champion(s)
- (Belgium) Kim Huybrechts

The 2013 Dutch Darts Masters was the eighth of eight PDC European Tour events on the 2013 PDC Pro Tour. The tournament took place at the Koningshof Hotel in Veldhoven, Netherlands, between 25–27 October 2013. It featured a field of 64 players and £100,000 in prize money, with £20,000 going to the winner.

Kim Huybrechts won his first European Tour title by defeating Brendan Dolan 6–3 in the final.

== Prize money ==
Stage (num. of players)		Prize money
Winner	(1)	£20,000
Runner-up	(1)	£10,000
Semi-finalists	(2)	£5,000
Quarter-finalists	(4)	£3,000
Third round losers	(8)	£2,000
Second round losers	(16)	£1,000
First round losers	(32)	£500
Total	£100,000	

== Qualification ==
The top 32 players from the PDC ProTour Order of Merit on 30 September 2013 automatically qualified for the event. The remaining 32 places went to players from three qualifying events - 20 from the UK Qualifier (held in Dublin on 4 October), eight from the European Qualifier and four from the Host Nation Qualifier (both held at the venue in Veldhoven on 24 October).

Robert Thornton withdrew from the event the day before it started for personal reasons and was replaced by an additional European Qualifier.

1–32

1. (Netherlands) Michael van Gerwen (semi-finals)
2. (England) Dave Chisnall (second round)
3. (Australia) Simon Whitlock (semi-finals)
4. (Scotland) Peter Wright (quarter-finals)
5. ~~(Scotland) Robert Thornton (withdrew)~~
6. (England) Jamie Caven (quarter-finals)
7. (England) Steve Beaton (first round)
8. (England) Wes Newton (quarter-finals)
9. (England) Mervyn King (third round)
10. (Australia) Paul Nicholson (second round)
11. (Canada) John Part (first round)
12. (Belgium) Kim Huybrechts (winner)
13. (England) Ian White (second round)
14. (England) Andy Hamilton (third round)
15. (Scotland) Gary Anderson (second round)
16. (England) Stuart Kellett (first round)
17. (England) Kevin Painter (second round)
18. (Northern Ireland) Brendan Dolan (runner-up)
19. (England) Adrian Lewis (second round)
20. (England) Ronnie Baxter (third round)
21. (England) Wayne Jones (second round)
22. (England) Andy Smith (first round)
23. (England) Justin Pipe (first round)
24. (England) Colin Lloyd (second round)
25. (England) Arron Monk (first round)
26. (England) James Wade (third round)
27. (England) Terry Jenkins (first round)
28. (Wales) Richie Burnett (first round)
29. (Netherlands) Raymond van Barneveld (second round)
30. (Wales) Mark Webster (second round)
31. (England) Mark Walsh (first round)
32. (Netherlands) Jelle Klaasen (first round)

UK Qualifier

- (England) John Bowles (first round)
- (England) Dan Russell (first round)
- (Northern Ireland) Mickey Mansell (third round)
- (England) Peter Hudson (first round)
- (England) Michael Barnard (third round)
- (Northern Ireland) Daryl Gurney (second round)
- (England) Paul Barham (first round)
- (England) Dave Ladley (first round)
- (England) Andrew Gilding (first round)
- (England) Mark Cox (third round)
- (England) Mark Dudbridge (first round)
- (England) Ross Smith (second round)
- (England) Darren Johnson (first round)
- (England) Joe Cullen (second round)
- (England) Mark Lawrence (first round)
- (Republic of Ireland) Campbell Jackson (second round)
- (England) James Richardson (first round)
- (England) Steve Hine (first round)
- (England) David Pallett (third round)
- (England) Dean Winstanley (first round)

European Qualifier

- (Germany) Jyhan Artut (first round)
- (Belgium) Davyd Venken (first round)
- (Austria) Maik Langendorf (first round)
- (Belgium) Ronny Huybrechts (second round)
- (Finland) Jarkko Komula (quarter-finals)
- (Germany) Michael Hurtz (first round)
- (Germany) Max Hopp (first round)
- (Germany) Andree Welge (first round)
- (Croatia) Tonči Restović (first round)

Host Nation Qualifier

- (Netherlands) Davy Verkooijen (first round)
- (Netherlands) Vincent van der Voort (first round)
- (Netherlands) Jerry Hendriks (first round)
- (Netherlands) Gino Vos (second round)

== Draw ==
First round (best of 11 legs); 25 October
1	(Netherlands) Michael van Gerwen 97.24	6
(Netherlands) Vincent van der Voort 94.94	5
32	(Netherlands) Jelle Klaasen 95.77	5
(England) Ross Smith 89.91	6
16	(England) Stuart Kellett 81.50	3
(England) Michael Barnard 83.49	6
17	(England) Kevin Painter 86.90	6
(England) Steve Hine 81.72	1
8	(England) Wes Newton 101.05	6
(England) Mark Dudbridge 91.09	1
25	(England) Arron Monk 82.60	0
(Belgium) Ronny Huybrechts 94.93	6
9	(England) Mervyn King 83.09	6
(England) Dan Russell 81.27	3
24	(England) Colin Lloyd 84.18	6
(Netherlands) Jerry Hendriks 79.15	2
Alt	(Croatia) Tonči Restović 81.12	3
(Northern Ireland) Mickey Mansell 85.67	6
28	(Wales) Richie Burnett 82.75	4
(Netherlands) Gino Vos 85.84	6
12	(Belgium) Kim Huybrechts 102.80	6
(England) Dean Winstanley 81.34	2
21	(England) Wayne Jones 85.65	6
(England) Paul Barham 79.80	1
4	(Scotland) Peter Wright 95.87	6
(England) John Bowles 94.65	3
29	(Netherlands) Raymond van Barneveld 90.53	6
(England) Andrew Gilding 86.96	3
13	(England) Ian White 88.21	6
(England) Mark Lawrence 77.00	1
20	(England) Ronnie Baxter 87.85	6
(England) Dave Ladley 81.55	1
2	(England) Dave Chisnall 96.97	6
(Germany) Max Hopp 87.67	0
31	(England) Mark Walsh 81.62	4
(England) David Pallett 91.94	6
15	(Scotland) Gary Anderson 95.69	6
(Germany) Andree Welge 95.07	4
18	(Northern Ireland) Brendan Dolan 90.03	6
(Belgium) Davyd Venken 86.70	1
7	(England) Steve Beaton 89.83	4
(Northern Ireland) Daryl Gurney 87.11	6
26	(England) James Wade 90.54	6
(England) James Richardson 85.75	4
10	(Australia) Paul Nicholson 82.11	6
(England) Peter Hudson 72.14	2
23	(England) Justin Pipe 93.25	5
(Finland) Jarkko Komula 88.33	6
6	(England) Jamie Caven 95.44	6
(Austria) Maik Langendorf 89.65	2
27	(England) Terry Jenkins 88.33	1
(England) Joe Cullen 97.33	6
11	(Canada) John Part 80.53	3
(Republic of Ireland) Campbell Jackson 81.77	6
22	(England) Andy Smith 89.43	1
(England) Mark Cox 96.25	6
3	(Australia) Simon Whitlock 93.84	6
(England) Darren Johnson 84.61	1
30	(Wales) Mark Webster 84.82	6
(Germany) Jyhan Artut 89.28	5
14	(England) Andy Hamilton 85.57	6
(Netherlands) Davy Verkooijen 78.27	2
19	(England) Adrian Lewis 101.85	6
(Germany) Michael Hurtz 86.50	1

Second round (best of 11 legs); 26 October
1	(Netherlands) van Gerwen 90.95	6
(England) R. Smith 95.80	3
(England) Barnard 85.50	6
17	(England) Painter 88.02	4
8	(England) Newton 100.23	6
(Belgium) R. Huybrechts 89.98	4
9	(England) King 88.22	6
24	(England) Lloyd 94.24	4
(Northern Ireland) Mansell 91.28	6
(Netherlands) Vos 85.37	2
12	(Belgium) K. Huybrechts 92.95	6
21	(England) Jones 92.38	5
4	(Scotland) Wright 99.35	6
29	(Netherlands) van Barneveld 96.15	3
13	(England) White 90.90	5
20	(England) Baxter 90.61	6
2	(England) Chisnall 91.91	3
(England) Pallett 92.20	6
15	(Scotland) Anderson 90.49	5
18	(Northern Ireland) Dolan 87.91	6
(Northern Ireland) Gurney 92.33	1
26	(England) Wade 101.56	6
10	(Australia) Nicholson 96.49	1
(Finland) Komula 97.13	6
6	(England) Caven 93.34	6
(England) Cullen 95.43	5
(Republic of Ireland) Jackson 78.20	5
(England) Cox 81.42	6
3	(Australia) Whitlock 92.24	6
30	(Wales) Webster 89.85	3
14	(England) Hamilton 89.31	6
19	(England) Lewis 86.51	4

Third round (best of 11 legs); 27 October
1	(Netherlands) van Gerwen 95.97	6
(England) Barnard 81.99	1
8	(England) Newton 100.08	6
9	(England) King 90.02	4
(Northern Ireland) Mansell 97.47	4
12	(Belgium) K. Huybrechts 100.64	6
4	(Scotland) Wright 92.63	6
20	(England) Baxter 88.03	4
(England) Pallett 85.18	2
18	(Northern Ireland) Dolan 85.78	6
26	(England) Wade 89.77	4
(Finland) Komula 90.24	6
6	(England) Caven 82.42	6
(England) Cox 75.73	4
3	(Australia) Whitlock 96.35	6
14	(England) Hamilton 90.46	2

Quarter-finals (best of 11 legs); 27 October
1	(Netherlands) van Gerwen 101.50	6
8	(England) Newton 97.70	3
12	(Belgium) K. Huybrechts 101.54	6
4	(Scotland) Wright 102.16	5
18	(Northern Ireland) Dolan 92.04	6
(Finland) Komula 87.61	1
6	(England) Caven 89.32	3
3	(Australia) Whitlock 91.21	6

Semi-finals (best of 11 legs); 27 October
1	(Netherlands) van Gerwen 102.57	3
12	(Belgium) K. Huybrechts 104.90	6
18	(Northern Ireland) Dolan 98.57	6
3	(Australia) Whitlock 89.59	3

Final (best of 11 legs); 27 October
12	(Belgium) K. Huybrechts 105.90	6
18	(Northern Ireland) Dolan 101.52	3
