= 2012 German Darts Masters =

Tournament information
- Dates: 7–9 September 2012
- Venue: Glaspalast
- Location: Sindelfingen
- Country: Germany
- Organisation(s): PDC
- Format: Legs
- Prize fund: £82,100
- Winner's share: £15,000
- Nine-dart finish: (Wales) Mark Webster (England) Ian White

Champion(s)
- (England) Adrian Lewis

The 2012 German Darts Masters was the fourth of five PDC European Tour events on the 2012 PDC Pro Tour. The tournament took place at the Glaspalast in Sindelfingen, Germany, from 7–9 September 2012. It featured a field of 64 players and £82,100 in prize money, with £15,000 going to the winner.

Adrian Lewis claimed his first European Tour title with a 6–3 win over Ian White.

There were two nine-dart finishes during the tournament. Mark Webster hit the first during his first-round game, which he lost to Andree Welge, and Ian White hit the second during his 6–5 last 16 victory against Andy Hamilton.

== Prize money ==
Stage (num. of players)		Prize money
Winner	(1)	£15,000
Runner-up	(1)	£7,500
Semi-finalists	(2)	£5,000
Quarter-finalists	(4)	£3,000
Third round losers	(8)	£1,500
Second round losers	(16)	£1,000
First round losers	(32)	£200
Final qualifying round losers	(32)	£100
Total	£82,100	

== Qualification ==
The top 32 players from the PDC Order of Merit automatically qualified for the event. The remaining 32 places went to players from three qualifying events - 20 from the UK Qualifier (held in Derby on August 3), eight from the European Qualifier (held in Berlin on August 4), and four from the Home Nation Qualifier (also held in Berlin on August 3).

Gary Anderson was banned from playing in this tournament, along with the Dutch Darts Masters and the European Championship. Also, Jelle Klaasen, Phil Taylor and Mark Hylton did not compete, with their opponents (Steve Beaton, Andy Jenkins and Jerry Hendriks respectively) receiving byes to the second round.

1–32

1. ~~(England) Phil Taylor (withdrew)~~
2. (England) Adrian Lewis (winner)
3. (England) James Wade (semi-finals)
4. (England) Wes Newton (third round)
5. (England) Andy Hamilton (third round)
6. (Australia) Simon Whitlock (quarter-finals)
7. (England) Terry Jenkins (third round)
8. (Wales) Mark Webster (first round)
9. (Netherlands) Raymond van Barneveld (semi-finals)
10. (England) Justin Pipe (first round)
11. (England) Kevin Painter (first round)
12. (England) Dave Chisnall (first round)
13. (England) Ronnie Baxter (first round)
14. (England) Mark Walsh (second round)
15. (Australia) Paul Nicholson (second round)
16. (England) Colin Lloyd (first round)
17. (Netherlands) Vincent van der Voort (quarter-finals)
18. (England) Mervyn King (first round)
19. (England) Andy Smith (first round)
20. (Scotland) Robert Thornton (quarter-finals)
21. (England) Jamie Caven (first round)
22. (England) Wayne Jones (third round)
23. (Canada) John Part (first round)
24. (England) Colin Osborne (second round)
25. (Northern Ireland) Brendan Dolan (second round)
26. (Wales) Richie Burnett (second round)
27. (England) Denis Ovens (first round)
28. (Netherlands) Michael van Gerwen (first round)
29. (Scotland) Peter Wright (first round)
30. (England) Steve Beaton (second round)
31. (England) Alan Tabern (first round)
32. ~~(England) Mark Hylton (withdrew)~~

UK Qualifier

- (England) Tony Littleton (second round)
- (England) Darren Johnson (first round)
- (England) Nick Fullwell (first round)
- (Wales) Jamie Lewis (first round)
- (England) Arron Monk (second round)
- (England) Ian White (runner-up)
- (England) Nigel Heydon (third round)
- (Republic of Ireland) William O'Connor (second round)
- (England) Mark Dudbridge (first round)
- (England) Andrew Gilding (first round)
- (England) Peter Hudson (second round)
- (England) Darren Webster (first round)
- (Northern Ireland) Mickey Mansell (third round)
- (England) Dean Winstanley (first round)
- (England) Andy Jenkins (second round)
- (England) Tony West (quarter-finals)
- (England) Stuart Kellett (second round)
- (England) James Richardson (second round)
- (England) Reece Robinson (first round)
- (England) Terry Temple (second round)

European Qualifier

- ~~(Netherlands) Jelle Klaasen (withdrew)~~
- (Austria) Mensur Suljović (first round)
- (Croatia) Tonči Restović (first round)
- (Netherlands) Leon de Geus (first round)
- (Belgium) Kurt van de Rijck (first round)
- (Belgium) Kim Huybrechts (second round)
- (Sweden) Magnus Caris (second round)
- (Netherlands) Jerry Hendriks (third round)

Host Nation Qualifier

- (Germany) Tomas Seyler (first round)
- (Germany) Andree Welge (third round)
- (Germany) Kevin Münch (first round)
- (Austria) Maik Langendorf (first round)

== Draw ==
First round (best of 11 legs); 7 September
1	(England) Phil Taylor	w/d
(England) Andy Jenkins	w/o
32	(England) Mark Hylton	w/d
(Netherlands) Jerry Hendriks	w/o
16	(England) Colin Lloyd	4
(England) Stuart Kellett	6
17	(Netherlands) Vincent van der Voort	6
(Austria) Maik Langendorf	4
8	(Wales) Mark Webster	4
(Germany) Andree Welge	6
25	(Northern Ireland) Brendan Dolan	6
(Netherlands) Leon de Geus	2
9	(Netherlands) Raymond van Barneveld	6
(England) Mark Dudbridge	3
24	(England) Colin Osborne	6
(England) Reece Robinson	2
5	(England) Andy Hamilton	6
(Austria) Mensur Suljović	2
28	(Netherlands) Michael van Gerwen	4
(England) Tony Littleton	6
12	(England) Dave Chisnall	4
(Belgium) Kim Huybrechts	6
21	(England) Jamie Caven	3
(England) Ian White	6
4	(England) Wes Newton	6
(England) Andrew Gilding	4
29	(Scotland) Peter Wright	3
(England) James Richardson	6
13	(England) Ronnie Baxter	2
(England) Arron Monk	6
20	(Scotland) Robert Thornton	6
(Germany) Kevin Münch	1
2	(England) Adrian Lewis	6
(England) Darren Johnson	1
31	(England) Alan Tabern	4
(England) Peter Hudson	6
15	(Australia) Paul Nicholson	6
(England) Dean Winstanley	2
18	(England) Mervyn King	5
(Northern Ireland) Mickey Mansell	6
7	(England) Terry Jenkins	6
(Germany) Tomas Seyler	3
26	(Wales) Richie Burnett	6
(Wales) Jamie Lewis	3
10	(England) Justin Pipe	5
(England) Tony West	6
23	(Canada) John Part	2
(England) Terry Temple	6
6	(Australia) Simon Whitlock	6
(Croatia) Tonči Restović	0
27	(England) Denis Ovens	4
(Sweden) Magnus Caris	6
11	(England) Kevin Painter	5
(Republic of Ireland) William O'Connor	6
22	(England) Wayne Jones	6
(England) Nick Fullwell	3
3	(England) James Wade	6
(Belgium) Kurt van de Rijck	4
30	(England) Steve Beaton	w/o
(Netherlands) Jelle Klaasen	w/d
14	(England) Mark Walsh	6
(England) Darren Webster	1
19	(England) Andy Smith	5
(England) Nigel Heydon	6

Second round (best of 11 legs); 8 September
(England) A. Jenkins 81.88	1
(Netherlands) Hendriks 88.65	6
(England) Kellett 90.76	5
17	(Netherlands) van der Voort 92.68	6
(Germany) Welge 85.73	6
25	(Northern Ireland) Dolan 85.92	4
9	(Netherlands) van Barneveld 91.82	6
24	(England) Osborne 84.85	1
5	(England) Hamilton 80.48	6
(England) Littleton 74.87	3
(Belgium) Huybrechts 94.22	5
(England) White 85.82	6
4	(England) Newton 92.81	6
(England) Richardson 82.30	4
(England) Monk 86.31	2
20	(Scotland) Thornton 93.14	6
2	(England) A. Lewis 103.65	6
(England) Hudson 77.53	1
15	(Australia) Nicholson 89.67	2
(Northern Ireland) Mansell 84.88	6
7	(England) T. Jenkins 92.17	6
26	(Wales) Burnett 90.12	4
(England) West 93.25	6
(England) Temple 88.26	4
6	(Australia) Whitlock 93.20	6
(Sweden) Caris 87.38	3
(Republic of Ireland) O'Connor 82.84	3
22	(England) Jones 96.20	6
3	(England) Wade 103.12	6
30	(England) Beaton 99.33	4
14	(England) Walsh 86.33	2
(England) Heydon 100.45	6

Third round (best of 11 legs); 9 September
(Netherlands) Hendriks 85.14	4
17	(Netherlands) van der Voort 84.57	6
(Germany) Welge 81.91	2
9	(Netherlands) van Barneveld 93.42	6
5	(England) Hamilton 88.66	5
(England) White 91.52	6
4	(England) Newton 98.08	0
20	(Scotland) Thornton 107.36	6
2	(England) A. Lewis 99.74	6
(Northern Ireland) Mansell 87.48	1
7	(England) T. Jenkins 86.37	4
(England) West 84.84	6
6	(Australia) Whitlock 98.46	6
22	(England) Jones 95.58	5
3	(England) Wade 94.83	6
(England) Heydon 83.36	4

Quarter-finals (best of 11 legs); 9 September
17	(Netherlands) van der Voort 88.29	4
9	(Netherlands) van Barneveld 90.02	6
(England) White 93.74	6
20	(Scotland) Thornton 92.02	5
2	(England) A. Lewis 94.44	6
(England) West 86.59	3
6	(Australia) Whitlock 105.98	3
3	(England) Wade 105.59	6

Semi-finals (best of 11 legs); 9 September
9	(Netherlands) van Barneveld 96.63	4
(England) White 99.56	6
2	(England) A. Lewis 95.22	6
3	(England) Wade 88.77	1

Final (best of 11 legs); 9 September
(England) White 95.26	3
2	(England) A. Lewis 97.71	6
