= Brendan Dolan =

Irish darts player (born 1973)

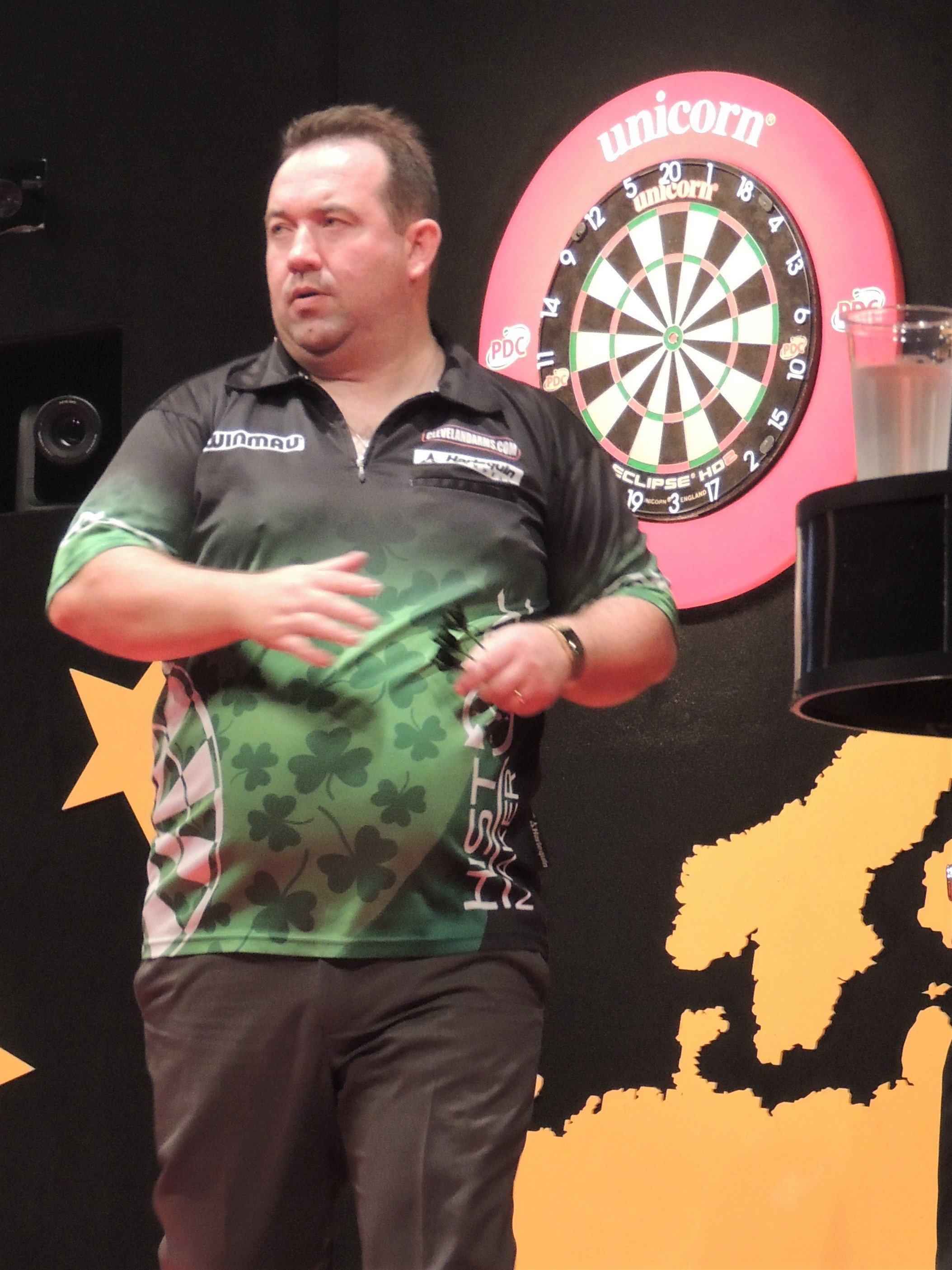
- Dolan in 2019

Personal information
- Nickname: "The History Maker"
- Born: 2 August 1973 (age 53) Enniskillen, Northern Ireland
- Home town: Belcoo, Northern Ireland

Sport
- Sport: Darts
- Playing since: 1979
- Darts: 25g Winmau Signature
- Laterality: Right-handed
- Walk-on music: "I'm Shipping Up to Boston" by Dropkick Murphys

Organisation (see split in darts)
- PDC: 2002–present (Tour Card: 2011–present)
- Current world ranking: (PDC) 48 ▲2 (29 October 2026)

WDF major events – best performances
- World Masters: Last 192: 2003

PDC premier events – best performances
- World Championship: Quarter-final: 2019, 2024
- World Matchplay: Last 16: 2013, 2015, 2016, 2023
- World Grand Prix: Runner-up: 2011
- UK Open: Quarter-final: 2014
- Grand Slam: Quarter-final: 2016
- European Championship: Semi-final: 2012
- PC Finals: Semi-final: 2021
- Masters: Last 16: 2014, 2015

Other tournament wins
- Years
UK Open Qualifier	2014
Ulster Open	2008
Players Championships (×9)
2013 (×2), 2014 (×2), 2019 (×2), 2022, 2021, 2024

Brendan Dolan (born 2 August 1973) is an Irish professional darts player who competes in Professional Darts Corporation (PDC) events. He was the first player to hit a nine-dart finish in a "double-to-start" event (where a player must hit a double to begin play), which he achieved at the 2011 World Grand Prix, giving him the nickname the History Maker. He also reached the final of this tournament, where he lost to Phil Taylor.

On the PDC Pro Tour, Dolan lost his first seven finals before winning his maiden ranking title in 2013. He has since won nine more events on the Pro Tour, most recently in 2024. He is noted for his 180 celebration where he twirls his finger in a helicopter style motion.

== Darts career ==
=== Early career ===
After two early exits in the 2003 and 2004 UK Open, Dolan's first major run came in the 2004 World Grand Prix where he earned his place through the All-Ireland qualifiers, winning one of four places. He defeated fellow qualifier Mark Wilton in the first round but lost 3–1 in the second to Kevin Painter. However, he did not yet play in full complement of PDC events as he only took part in a total of four tournaments in 2005 and 2006. Dolan reached the last 32 of the 2007 UK Open, beating Bob Anderson and Darren Johnson before losing to Dennis Priestley.

=== 2008 ===
In March 2008, Dolan reached his first PDC Pro Tour final, doing so in the UK Open Midlands Regional Final. He scored wins over Vincent van der Voort, Roland Scholten, Wes Newton, Colin Lloyd and Colin Osborne before losing to Phil Taylor. The result though earned Dolan £3,000, which helped him finish 16th in the UK Open rankings and enter the tournament in the third round. He defeated fellow countryman John MaGowan in the third round and then beat Adrian Lewis to reach the last 16 where he lost to Chris Thompson. Dolan won the non-ranking 2008 Ulster Open, beating Ronnie Baxter in the final. He qualified for the 2008 World Grand Prix as the highest ranked player from Northern Ireland in the PDC Order of Merit and was beaten in the first round by Jacko Barry.

=== 2009 ===
Dolan qualified for the 2009 World Championship by winning one of eight places at the qualifiers in Telford. He was beaten 3–0 by number three seed James Wade in the first round. In October, he reached his second PDC Pro Tour final in Nuland, where Wade fought back from 2–0 down to defeat Dolan 6–2.

=== 2010 ===
Dolan qualified for the 2010 World Championship via the Players Championship Order of Merit and won his first game at the event by defeating Tony Eccles 3–1 in the first round, but lost 4–0 in the second to Raymond van Barneveld, who hit a nine-dart finish in the match. He qualified for the Players Championship Finals for the first time but lost 6–5 to Adrian Lewis in the first round.

=== 2011 – Dolan's Breakthrough ===
At the 2011 World Championship, Dolan defeated Kevin Painter 3–0 in the first round before losing 0–4 to Wes Newton in the second round.

At the World Grand Prix, Dolan defeated Wayne Jones, John Part and John Henderson to qualify for the semi-finals of the event. In his semi-final against James Wade, Dolan became the first darts player to hit a nine-dart finish with the double-start rule on television. He hit 160 to start, followed by a 180, then followed this up with treble 20, treble 17, and then the bullseye. Dolan eventually won the match 5–2 to reach the final, where his run ended with a 6–3 loss to Phil Taylor.

=== 2012 ===
Dolan did not enjoy a good 2012 World Championship as he lost 0–3 in the first round to Kim Huybrechts, picking up just two legs during the match. He then represented Northern Ireland with Michael Mansell in the World Cup and together they reached the quarter-finals, where they were whitewashed by the Netherlands 0–4, having beaten Denmark in the second round. Dolan reached the last 32 of the UK Open, where he lost 8–9 to Denis Ovens. He also reached the World Matchplay for the first time and was defeated by Andy Hamilton 7–10 in the first round.

At the European Championship Dolan beat Justin Pipe and Andree Welge to set up a quarter-final meeting with Phil Taylor, who had never lost a match in the event. Dolan became the first man in 23 attempts to defeat Taylor in the tournament with a 10–6 win, at the same time breaking his own duck against the fifteen-time world champion after 14 previous losses. Dolan played Wes Newton in the semi-finals and from being 9–6 up he lost five consecutive legs to bow out 9–11.

Dolan once again produced his best form at his home tournament, the World Grand Prix in October. He comfortably beat world number four Gary Anderson, Vincent van der Voort and Justin Pipe to reach the semi-finals for the second successive year and the second successive major event. Dolan took out a 170 finish to trail 1–2 in sets against Mervyn King, but was unable to stop King from going on to win 5–2. At the Grand Slam, he finished second in Group F thanks to wins over Paul Nicholson and Barrie Bates to qualify for the last 16. Dolan played John Part and made a disastrous start to the match as he trailed 0–6 and despite only trailing at one point 6–8, he lost 6–10. After all 33 ProTour events of 2012 had been played, Dolan was 21st on the Order of Merit, comfortably inside the top 32 who qualified for the Players Championship Finals. He beat James Wade 6–4 in the first round, and again fell 0–6 down in the second round against Justin Pipe, and never quite recovered as he was defeated 8–10.

=== 2013 ===
Dolan lost in the second round of the 2013 World Championship 1–4 to Raymond van Barneveld. In his third World Cup and second with Michael Mansell the pair were beaten 4–5 in the last 16 by the Croatian duo of Robert Marijanović and Tonči Restović. Dolan reached the final of the second UK Open Qualifier following wins over the likes of Dave Chisnall, Ronnie Baxter and van Barneveld. He faced Michael van Gerwen and was defeated 2–6. At the UK Open itself he eliminated Matt Padgett and Colin Lloyd to reach the last 16 for the first time since 2008. He faced Phil Taylor and missed three match darts when leading 8–7. He threw first in the deciding leg but Taylor only needed 11 darts to beat Dolan 9–8.

In October, Dolan came close to winning his first ranking tournament as he led Adrian Lewis 3–0 in the final of the ninth Players Championship, but went on to lose 6–4. Dolan faced Lewis again a few days later in the first round of the World Grand Prix and lost in the deciding leg of the final set. Another defeat in a final followed at the Dutch Darts Masters as he was beaten 6–3 by Kim Huybrechts despite averaging 101.52. This meant he had appeared in eight ranking finals without landing a title. However, a week later at the 13th Players Championship Dolan finally won his first PDC ranking tournament. He took advantage of a depleted field due to the top 16 on the Order of Merit all participating in the Masters to defeat world number 110 Ricky Evans 6–3 in the final. His second tournament win came later in the month at the final Players Championship of 2013 where he beat Jamie Robinson 6–1 in the final.

=== 2014 ===
Dolan was outplayed by Gary Anderson in the World Championship in a 4–1 defeat. He won the fourth UK Open Qualifier by beating Jamie Lewis 6–1. A favourable draw saw Dolan beat Steve Beaton, Nigel Heydon and Aden Kirk to reach the quarter-finals of the UK Open for the first time, where he lost 10–4 to Terry Jenkins. His second title of the season and fourth in sixth months came at the fifth Players Championship where he averaged 103.66 in whitewashing Michael Smith 6–0 in the final. In June, Dolan and Mansell beat Peter Wright and Robert Thornton from Scotland in the quarter-finals of the World Cup. In the semis, Dolan edged world number one Michael van Gerwen 4–3, but Mansell lost 4–0 to Van Barneveld to send the match into a deciding doubles game in which the Dutch pair averaged an incredible 117.88 to progress with a 4–0 whitewash.

Dolan won the 16th Players Championship with a 6–2 victory over Anderson at the Citywest Hotel in Dublin, the same venue where he reached the final and threw a nine-dart finish in the 2011 World Grand Prix. A day later, Anderson exacted revenge by knocking Dolan out of the first round of the World Grand Prix 2–0 in sets. He missed doubles in successive legs at 8–7 up against Van Gerwen in the second round of the European Championship and was eliminated 10–8. Dolan earned a spot in the Grand Slam through the qualifier, but lost each of his group games against Wright, Simon Whitlock and Michael Smith to finish bottom of the table.

=== 2015 ===
Dolan dropped just one leg as he won the first two sets of his second round match with Michael Smith at the World Championship. However, he could only win two of the next fourteen legs to be defeated 4–2, which means he has now failed to advance beyond the second round in seven appearances at the event. His first final of the year was at the fifth Players Championship event where he lost 6–5 to Adrian Lewis.

Dolan and Mansell met the Netherlands' Van Gerwen and Van Barneveld for the second successive year at the World Cup, this time in the quarter-finals. Dolan lost 4–2 to Van Gerwen, but Mansell defeated Van Barneveld 4–3 meaning a doubles match was required and, just like the previous year, Northern Ireland were thrashed 4–0. Dolan eliminated Vincent van der Voort 10–6 at the World Matchplay, before losing 13–8 to James Wade in the second round. He was knocked out in the first round of the World Grand Prix, European Championship and Players Championship Finals.

=== 2016 ===
Dolan once again failed to produce his best form at the World Championship in the 2016 event as he was whitewashed 3–0 by Kyle Anderson in the first round. He lost 9–6 to amateur Barry Lynn in the third round of the UK Open. Dolan partnered Daryl Gurney at the World Cup for the first time and they defeated Japan, Ireland and Canada to reach the semi-finals, where they lost both their singles matches against the English pairing of Phil Taylor and Adrian Lewis. At the World Matchplay he beat Raymond van Barneveld 10–7, before losing 11–8 to Mervyn King.

Before the World Grand Prix Dolan married his partner Teresa and then defeated Peter Wright 2–0 in the first round, but was then eliminated 3–1 by Dave Chisnall. Dolan recorded victories over Max Hopp and Martin Adams to qualify from his group at the Grand Slam behind Michael van Gerwen. He was 5–1 down to Gerwyn Price but pulled back to 5–5 and in the latter half of the contest took out finishes of 160 and 157 and squeezed through to his only quarter-final of 2016 10–9. There, he was thrashed 16–3 by Van Gerwen. Two deciding leg successes saw Dolan get to the third round of the Players Championship Finals and he lost 10–4 to Kim Huybrechts.

=== 2017 ===
Dolan's quest to get past the second round of the World Championship continued as he lost at that stage in the 2017 tournament 4–0 to Jelle Klaasen. He has played in the event eight times without getting to the last 16.

=== 2018 ===
Due to poor form, Dolan failed to qualify for the 2018 World Championship outright through the Pro Tour Order of Merit, but did reach the final of the PDPA Qualifier, losing to Ted Evetts, and therefore qualified for the preliminary round. There, he defeated Croatia's Alan Ljubić to set up a first round tie with Robert Thornton, which Thornton won 3–1.

Dolan's best result of the season came at Players Championship 12, where he read the semi-finals, losing to Peter Wright. An uptick in Pro Tour form saw him qualify for the 2018 Players Championship Finals, where he caused an upset by beating #1 seed Ian White in the second round before going out to his World Cup partner Daryl Gurney.

=== 2019 ===
Dolan qualified for the 2019 PDC World Darts Championship through the Pro Tour Order of Merit, and went on to have his best run at the event yet, winning in straight sets against Yuanjun Liu and Joe Cullen, then took out seeds Mervyn King and Benito van de Pas, before losing 1–5 to a rampant Nathan Aspinall in the quarter-finals.

In the UK Open, Dolan lost his fourth-round match to Richard North. Despite that, 2019 saw a great improvement in his form as he qualified for six European events. At Players Championship 22, Dolan won his first title in five years, beating Jermaine Wattimena in the final 8–5. He repeated the trick at PC 29, winning 8–6 against Ian White. He also won a wild card for the Grand Slam of Darts, where he lost 1–5 to Gabriel Clemens, then beat Richard Veenstra by the same scoreline to set up a Northern Ireland decider against Daryl Gurney, which Dolan lost 2–5 to exit the tournament. His Pro Tour exploits saw him qualify for the 2019 Players Championship Finals as the #22 seed, and he beat Ross Smith in the first round before falling to Michael Smith.

=== 2020 ===
For the 2020 PDC World Darts Championship Dolan again qualified via the Pro Tour Order of Merit. In the first round, he won 3–0 against the Indian qualifier, Nitin Kumar. In the second round, he met the fifth seed of the tournament, two times world champion Gary Anderson. Dolan was able to win only one leg throughout the match and lost 0–3.

After that, he played very well in the first Players Championship. After defeating Lisa Ashton, John Michael, Michael van Gerwen, Ross Smith and Maik Kuivenhoven, Dolan made it to the semifinal. There he lost 2–7 to Jeff Smith, who had just recently got the Tour card. He did not manage to qualify for the first two European Tour events.

In the UK Open, he again lost his first match, in the fourth round against Jamie Hughes 9-10.

In March he managed to qualify for the fourth event of the European Tour, which was later postponed until October due to COVID-19. The day after qualifying, he made it to the final of Players Championship 7 in Barnsley. He managed to defeat Adrian Gray, Niels Zonneveld, Ciaran Teehan, Dave Chisnall, Derk Telnekes and James Wade. In the final he faced Nathan Aspinall to whom he lost 4-8 and missed the chance to repeat the title from last year.

For the first time since 2016, he qualified for the World Matchplay, which was played behind closed doors. In the first round he played the top seed, Michael van Gerwen. He played fairly evenly in the match, but eventually ended up losing 7-10.

Also for the first time since 2016, he managed to qualify for the World Grand Prix, which was being held in Coventry during October. In the tournament where he hit the first televised 9-darter ever, he played against Kim Huybrechts in the first round. In a very close match in which Dolan had a higher three dart average than his opponent, he lost in the deciding set 1–2. Thanks to these two majors that he missed in past years, he secured his spot in the top 32 after them.

=== 2024 ===
In the 2024 World Championship Dolan reached the quarter-finals, losing to Luke Littler 5–1.

In May 2024, Dolan won a tenth career Players Championship event with victory at PC10, his first ranking title for almost two years.

== Personal life ==
Dolan married Teresa (née Doherty) on 28 September 2016, at a traditional ceremony in County Cavan. Their honeymoon was postponed as Dolan was scheduled to compete in the 2016 World Grand Prix the following week.

Prior to turning professional in darts, Dolan worked as a painter and decorator, having previously worked in the Elite Electronics factory in Enniskillen. He played underage GAA as a corner-back for his local club, Belcoo O'Rahilly's.

== World Championship performances ==
=== PDC World Championship ===
- 2009: First round (lost to James Wade 0–3)
- 2010: Second round (lost to Raymond van Barneveld 0–4)
- 2011: Second round (lost to Wes Newton 0–4)
- 2012: First round (lost to Kim Huybrechts 0–3)
- 2013: Second round (lost to Raymond van Barneveld 1–4)
- 2014: Second round (lost to Gary Anderson 1–4)
- 2015: Second round (lost to Michael Smith 2–4)
- 2016: First round (lost to Kyle Anderson 0–3)
- 2017: Second round (lost to Jelle Klaasen 0–4)
- 2018: First round (lost to Robert Thornton 1–3)
- 2019: Quarter-finals (lost to Nathan Aspinall 1–5)
- 2020: Second round (lost to Gary Anderson 0–3)
- 2021: Third round (lost to Gerwyn Price 3–4)
- 2022: Second round (lost to Callan Rydz 0–3)
- 2023: Third round (lost to Jonny Clayton 1–4)
- 2024: Quarter-finals (lost to Luke Littler 1–5)
- 2025: Third round (lost to Michael van Gerwen 2–4)
- 2026: Second round (lost to Ryan Searle 0–3)

== Career finals ==
=== PDC major finals: 1 (1 runner-up) ===
Outcome	No.	Year	Championship	Opponent in the final	Score (Note: (l) = score in legs, (s) = score in sets.)
Runner-up	1.	2011	World Grand Prix	Phil Taylor	3–6 (s)

== Career statistics ==
=== Performance timeline ===
Tournament	2003	2004	2005	2006	2007	2008	2009	2010	2011	2012	2013	2014	2015	2016	2017	2018	2019	2020	2021	2022	2023	2024	2025	2026
PDC Ranked televised events
World Championship	Did not participate					DNQ	1R	2R	2R	1R	2R	2R	2R	1R	2R	1R	QF	2R	3R	2R	3R	QF	3R	2R
World Masters (Note: A non-ranked event until 2025.)	Not held										DNQ	1R	1R	Did not qualify						1R	DNQ		Prel.	Prel.
UK Open	1R	1R	DNQ		5R	5R	3R	3R	1R	4R	5R	QF	3R	3R	3R	DNQ	4R	4R	6R	4R	6R	4R	4R	3R
World Matchplay	DNP					Did not qualify				1R	2R	1R	2R	2R	DNQ			1R	1R	1R	2R	1R	DNQ	
World Grand Prix	DNP	2R	DNP			1R	1R	1R	F	SF	1R	1R	1R	2R	DNQ			1R	1R	1R	2R	1R	DNQ	
European Championship	Not held					Did not qualify				SF	1R	2R	1R	Did not qualify					2R	DNQ	1R	DNQ		
Grand Slam (Note: A non-ranked event until 2015.)	Not held				DNQ				RR	RR	DNQ	RR	DNQ	QF	DNQ		RR	DNQ			RR	DNQ		
Players Championship Finals	Not held						DNQ	1R	DNQ	2R	2R	2R	1R	3R	1R	3R	2R	1R	SF	1R	3R	1R	1R	
PDC Non-ranked televised events
World Cup	Not yet founded							2R	NH	QF	2R	SF	QF	SF	1R	2R	1R	1R	QF	QF	RR	QF	DNQ	DNP
World Series Finals	Not yet founded												DNQ	1R	Did not qualify									
PDC Past major events
Championship League	Not held					DNP				RR	RR	Not held												
Year-end ranking	141	108	84	105	288	121	45	35	27	19	13	11	18	23	36	45	35	30	23	25	28	31	41	

=== PDC European Tour ===
Season	1	2	3	4	5	6	7	8	9	10	11	12	13	14	15
2012	ADO; 1R	GDC; 2R	EDO; 2R	GDM; 2R	DDM; 2R										
2013	UKM; 2R	EDT; 2R	EDO; 3R	ADO; QF	GDT; 1R	GDC; 2R	GDM; QF	DDM; F							
2014	GDC; 2R	DDM; SF	GDM; 3R	ADO; 3R	GDT; 3R	EDO; 3R	EDG; 2R	EDT; 3R							
2015	GDC; 3R	GDT; 2R	GDM; QF	DDM; 3R	IDO; 3R	EDO; QF	EDT; 2R	EDM; 3R	EDG; 2R						
2016	DDM; 2R	GDM; 2R	DNQ		ADO; 1R	EDO; DNQ	IDO; 1R	EDT; DNQ	EDG; 2R	GDC; 1R					
2017	Did not qualify					EDM; 1R	Did not qualify				IDO; 2R	EDT; DNQ			
2018	Did not qualify			ADO; 2R	DNQ		GDT; 2R	DDO; QF	Did not qualify				EDT; 1R		
2019	DNQ		GDG; 1R	GDO; 1R	ADO; DNQ	EDG; 2R	DDM; 3R	DDO; DNQ	CDO; 1R	ADC; 2R	Did not qualify				
2020	Did not qualify			IDO; 1R											
2021	HDT; QF	GDT; QF													
2022	IDO; 2R	GDC; WD	GDG; 2R	ADO; 2R	EDO; 3R	CDO; 2R	EDG; QF	DDC; 2R	Did not qualify						
2023	BSD; 1R	EDO; 3R	IDO; 2R	GDG; 1R	ADO; 1R	DNQ		CDO; 2R	EDG; DNQ	EDM; 2R	GDO; DNQ	HDT; 1R	GDC; DNQ		
2024	BDO; 2R	GDG; 2R	IDO; 2R	EDG; 2R	ADO; 2R	BSD; 1R	DDC; 2R	EDO; DNQ	GDC; 1R	FDT; 1R	HDT; 1R	SDT; 1R	CDO; 1R		
2025	Did not qualify							EDO; 1R	DNQ		CDO; 1R	Did not qualify			
2026	Did not qualify			GDG; 2R	Did not qualify								FDT; 2R	SDT; DNQ	DDC; 3R

=== PDC Players Championships ===
Season	1	2	3	4	5	6	7	8	9	10	11	12	13	14	15	16	17	18	19	20	21	22	23	24	25	26	27	28	29	30	31	32	33	34	35	36	37
2008 (Note: Tour card system non-existent)	GIB; DNP		ESS; 3R	WIG; 3R	BSO; DNP		TEL; 4R	ANT; DNP	GLA; 2R	AMS; DNP	BRI; QF	BRI; 1R	LVE; DNP	BLA; 1R	DNP			KON; 1R	KON; 2R	DRO; 1R	CHI; DNP	NEW; 2R	NEW; 2R	DUB; 4R	DUB; 1R	SCO; 1R	SCO; 2R	KIR; DNP	KIL; 3R	LEI; DNP							
2009	DON; Prel.	GIB; DNP		GLD; 2R	GLD; 1R	IRV; 1R	WIG; 1R	BRE; 1R	COV; 2R	NUL; DNP		TAU; 2R	DER; 4R	NEW; 2R	BAR; 1R	BAR; 1R	DIN; 2R	DIN; 1R	Did not participate					SAL; 3R	SAL; SF	DUB; 1R	DUB; 2R	KIL; 3R	NUL; 2R	NUL; F	IRV; 4R	IRV; F					
2010	GIB; DNP		SWI; 3R	DER; 4R	GLA; 1R	GLA; SF	WIG; 2R	CRA; 2R	BAR; 3R	DER; 1R	WIG; 1R	WIG; 3R	SAL; 3R	SAL; 1R	BAR; 3R	BAR; 3R	HAA; 1R	HAA; 1R	LVE; 2R	LVE; 3R	LVE; 2R	Did not participate			CRA; 1R	CRA; QF	NUL; 3R	NUL; QF	DUB; 2R	DUB; 2R	KIL; 3R	BNA; 3R	BNA; 2R	BAR; 3R	BAR; 2R	DER; 3R	DER; 3R
2011	HAL; 2R	HAL; 3R	DER; 1R	DER; QF	CRA; 1R	CRA; 1R	VIE; 2R	VIE; QF	CRA; 1R	CRA; 1R	BAR; 2R	BAR; 2R	NUL; 1R	NUL; 1R	ONT; DNP		DER; 3R	DER; 1R	NUL; QF	NUL; 2R	DUB; 1R	DUB; 1R	KIL; 1R	GLA; DNP		ALI; 2R	ALI; 1R	CRA; 1R	CRA; SF	WIG; 3R	WIG; 3R						
2012	ALI; 2R	ALI; 3R	REA; 4R	REA; 4R	CRA; 3R	CRA; 4R	BIR; 3R	BIR; 1R	CRA; QF	CRA; 3R	BAR; 1R	BAR; 3R	DUB; 4R	DUB; 3R	KIL; 2R	KIL; 2R	CRA; 1R	CRA; QF	BAR; 1R	BAR; 3R																	
2013	WIG; 3R	WIG; 1R	WIG; 3R	WIG; 2R	CRA; 1R	CRA; SF	BAR; 1R	BAR; 2R	DUB; F	DUB; 4R	KIL; QF	KIL; 3R	WIG; W	WIG; 2R	BAR; 2R	BAR; W																					
2014	BAR; 4R	BAR; 1R	CRA; 1R	CRA; 1R	WIG; W	WIG; 1R	WIG; 2R	WIG; 3R	CRA; QF	CRA; 2R	COV; 3R	COV; SF	CRA; SF	CRA; 3R	DUB; SF	DUB; W	CRA; 2R	CRA; 1R	COV; SF	COV; 3R																	
2015	BAR; 3R	BAR; 4R	BAR; 1R	BAR; 1R	BAR; F	COV; QF	COV; 1R	COV; 4R	CRA; 2R	CRA; QF	BAR; 2R	BAR; QF	WIG; 1R	WIG; 2R	BAR; QF	BAR; 1R	DUB; 3R	DUB; 3R	COV; 3R	COV; 4R																	
2016	BAR; 2R	BAR; 2R	BAR; 2R	BAR; 1R	BAR; 3R	BAR; 2R	BAR; 1R	COV; 2R	COV; 1R	BAR; 1R	BAR; 2R	BAR; 3R	BAR; 1R	BAR; 3R	BAR; 1R	BAR; 1R	DUB; 2R	DUB; 3R	BAR; 1R	BAR; 2R																	
2017	BAR; 4R	BAR; 1R	BAR; 1R	BAR; 1R	MIL; 2R	MIL; 2R	BAR; 3R	BAR; 1R	WIG; 1R	WIG; 1R	MIL; 1R	MIL; 2R	WIG; 3R	WIG; 2R	BAR; 1R	BAR; QF	BAR; 3R	BAR; QF	DUB; 2R	DUB; 1R	BAR; 2R	BAR; 1R															
2018	BAR; 2R	BAR; 1R	BAR; QF	BAR; 1R	MIL; 4R	MIL; 1R	BAR; 1R	BAR; 1R	WIG; 1R	WIG; 2R	MIL; QF	MIL; SF	WIG; 2R	WIG; 1R	BAR; 2R	BAR; QF	BAR; 1R	BAR; 3R	DUB; 2R	DUB; 3R	BAR; 1R	BAR; 2R															
2019	WIG; 1R	WIG; 3R	WIG; 2R	WIG; 1R	BAR; 2R	BAR; 1R	WIG; 1R	WIG; 2R	BAR; 1R	BAR; 1R	BAR; 1R	BAR; 1R	BAR; 2R	BAR; 4R	BAR; 1R	BAR; 1R	WIG; 2R	WIG; 4R	BAR; 1R	BAR; 1R	HIL; 1R	HIL; W	BAR; 1R	BAR; 1R	BAR; 2R	BAR; 1R	DUB; 3R	DUB; 1R	BAR; W	BAR; 1R							
2020	BAR; SF	BAR; 3R	WIG; 2R	WIG; 2R	WIG; 4R	WIG; 3R	BAR; F	BAR; 2R	MIL; 2R	MIL; 2R	MIL; 1R	MIL; 2R	MIL; 4R	NIE; 1R	NIE; 1R	NIE; 1R	NIE; 2R	NIE; SF	COV; SF	COV; QF	COV; 3R	COV; 4R	COV; 3R														
2021	BOL; 2R	BOL; 1R	BOL; 2R	BOL; 1R	MIL; W	MIL; SF	MIL; 1R	MIL; SF	NIE; QF	NIE; 3R	NIE; SF	NIE; 2R	MIL; 3R	MIL; 2R	MIL; 3R	MIL; 4R	COV; QF	COV; 1R	COV; F	COV; 4R	BAR; 3R	BAR; 2R	BAR; 3R	BAR; 1R	BAR; 4R	BAR; 4R	BAR; QF	BAR; 1R	BAR; 4R	BAR; 1R							
2022	BAR; 1R	BAR; 1R	WIG; 1R	WIG; 1R	BAR; 1R	BAR; 3R	NIE; 1R	NIE; QF	BAR; 3R	BAR; 4R	BAR; 2R	BAR; 2R	BAR; SF	WIG; 2R	WIG; 1R	NIE; 3R	NIE; 3R	BAR; 1R	BAR; 1R	BAR; 1R	BAR; W	BAR; 2R	BAR; 1R	BAR; 3R	BAR; 2R	BAR; 2R	BAR; 3R	BAR; 2R	BAR; 2R	BAR; 1R							
2023	BAR; 1R	BAR; SF	BAR; 1R	BAR; 2R	BAR; 1R	BAR; 1R	HIL; 3R	HIL; QF	WIG; SF	WIG; 3R	LEI; 3R	LEI; 3R	HIL; 1R	HIL; 3R	LEI; SF	LEI; 2R	HIL; 3R	HIL; 1R	BAR; QF	BAR; 1R	BAR; 2R	BAR; 2R	BAR; QF	BAR; 3R	BAR; SF	BAR; 1R	BAR; 1R	BAR; 1R	BAR; 2R	BAR; 1R							
2024	WIG; QF	WIG; 1R	LEI; 1R	LEI; QF	HIL; 2R	HIL; 1R	LEI; 2R	LEI; 3R	HIL; 2R	HIL; W	HIL; 1R	HIL; 2R	MIL; 2R	MIL; 2R	MIL; 1R	MIL; QF	MIL; 1R	MIL; 1R	MIL; 1R	WIG; 1R	WIG; 1R	LEI; 2R	LEI; 1R	WIG; 1R	WIG; 3R	WIG; 3R	WIG; 2R	WIG; 2R	LEI; 1R	LEI; 1R							
2025	WIG; 1R	WIG; 2R	ROS; 2R	ROS; 3R	LEI; 3R	LEI; 2R	HIL; DNP		LEI; SF	LEI; 3R	LEI; 2R	LEI; 3R	ROS; 1R	ROS; 3R	HIL; 1R	HIL; F	LEI; 3R	LEI; 1R	LEI; 4R	LEI; 2R	LEI; 3R	HIL; 2R	HIL; 3R	MIL; 2R	MIL; 1R	HIL; 3R	HIL; 1R	LEI; SF	LEI; 2R	LEI; 3R	WIG; 1R	WIG; 2R	WIG; 1R	WIG; 2R			
2026	HIL; 1R	HIL; 1R	WIG; 1R	WIG; 1R	LEI; 4R	LEI; 2R	LEI; 1R	LEI; 2R	WIG; 1R	WIG; 4R	MIL; 1R	MIL; 3R	HIL; 2R	HIL; 1R	LEI; 1R	LEI; 3R	LEI; 1R	LEI; 2R	MIL; 1R	MIL; 2R	WIG; 1R	WIG; 1R	LEI; 1R	LEI; SF	HIL; 4R	HIL; 3R	LEI; 1R	LEI; F	ROS; 2R	ROS; 4R	ROS; 3R	ROS; 1R	LEI; 4R	LEI; 2R			

Performance Table Legend
W	Won the tournament	F	Finalist	SF	Semifinalist	QF	Quarterfinalist	#R; RR; Prel.	Lost in # round Round-robin; Preliminary round	DQ	Disqualified
DNQ	Did not qualify	DNP	Did not participate	WD	Withdrew	NH	Tournament not held	#R; RR; Prel.	Lost in # round Round-robin; Preliminary round	NYF	Not yet founded

== Nine-dart finishes ==
Brendan Dolan televised nine-dart finishes
Date	Opponent	Tournament	Method	Prize
8 October 2011	(England) James Wade	World Grand Prix	D20, 2 x T20; 3 x T20; T20, T17, bullseye	£5,000
