= 2012 European Darts Open =

Tournament information
- Dates: 6–8 July 2012
- Venue: Maritim Hotel
- Location: Düsseldorf
- Country: Germany
- Organisation(s): PDC
- Format: Legs
- Prize fund: £82,100
- Winner's share: £15,000

Champion(s)
- (Netherlands) Raymond van Barneveld

The 2012 European Darts Open was the third of five PDC European Tour events on the 2012 PDC Pro Tour. The tournament took place at the Maritim Hotel in Düsseldorf, Germany, from 6–8 July 2012. It featured a field of 64 players and £82,100 in prize money, with £15,000 going to the winner.

Raymond van Barneveld won the title, defeating Dave Chisnall 6–4 in the final. This was Chisnall's second successive defeat in a European Tour final.

== Prize money ==
Stage (num. of players)		Prize money
Winner	(1)	£15,000
Runner-up	(1)	£7,500
Semi-finalists	(2)	£5,000
Quarter-finalists	(4)	£3,000
Third round losers	(8)	£1,500
Second round losers	(16)	£1,000
First round losers	(32)	£200
Final qualifying round losers	(32)	£100
Total	£82,100	

== Qualification ==
The top 32 players from the PDC Order of Merit automatically qualified for the event. The remaining 32 places went to players from three qualifying events - 20 from the UK Qualifier (held in Birmingham on June 15), eight from the European Qualifier (held in Berlin on June 23), and four from the Home Nation Qualifier (also held in Berlin on June 23).

1–32

1. (England) Adrian Lewis (second round)
2. (England) James Wade (quarter-finals)
3. ~~(Scotland) Gary Anderson (withdrew)~~
4. (England) Wes Newton (second round)
5. (Australia) Simon Whitlock (quarter-finals)
6. (England) Andy Hamilton (first round)
7. (Netherlands) Raymond van Barneveld (winner)
8. (England) Terry Jenkins (first round)
9. (England) Kevin Painter (second round)
10. (England) Justin Pipe (first round)
11. (England) Mark Walsh (third round)
12. (Netherlands) Vincent van der Voort (second round)
13. (Australia) Paul Nicholson (first round)
14. (England) Wayne Jones (first round)
15. (England) Colin Lloyd (first round)
16. (England) Ronnie Baxter (second round)
17. (England) Mervyn King (semi-finals)
18. (England) Andy Smith (third round)
19. (England) Jamie Caven (first round)
20. (England) Dave Chisnall (runner-up)
21. (Scotland) Robert Thornton (third round)
22. (England) Denis Ovens (first round)
23. (Canada) John Part (first round)
24. (England) Colin Osborne (quarter-finals)
25. (England) Alan Tabern (first round)
26. (Northern Ireland) Brendan Dolan (second round)
27. (England) Steve Brown (second round)
28. (Scotland) Peter Wright (first round)
29. (Netherlands) Co Stompé (first round)
30. (Wales) Richie Burnett (semi-finals)
31. (England) Mark Hylton (first round)
32. (England) Steve Beaton (third round)

UK Qualifier

- (England) Ian White (first round)
- (England) Stuart Kellett (first round)
- (South Africa) Devon Petersen (first round)
- (England) Tony Littleton (first round)
- (England) James Hubbard (quarter-finals)
- (England) Joe Cullen (second round)
- (England) Dean Winstanley (first round)
- (England) Ross Smith (first round)
- (England) Mark Jones (first round)
- (England) Brian Woods (second round)
- (England) Mick Todd (first round)
- (England) Scott Rand (second round)
- ~~(England) Steve Maish (withdrew)~~
- (Wales) Jamie Lewis (first round)
- (England) Andy Jenkins (first round)
- (England) Arron Monk (first round)
- (England) Mark Dudbridge (third round)
- (England) Johnny Haines (third round)
- (Northern Ireland) Mickey Mansell (second round)
- (Scotland) Jim Walker (first round)

European Qualifier

- (Belgium) Ronny Huybrechts (second round)
- (Netherlands) Michael van Gerwen (third round)
- (Belgium) Kim Huybrechts (second round)
- (Netherlands) Gino Vos (third round)
- (Sweden) Magnus Caris (first round)
- (Netherlands) Ryan de Vreede (first round)
- (Netherlands) Jelle Klaasen (second round)
- (Croatia) Tonči Restović (second round)

Host Nation Qualifier

- (Germany) Kevin Münch (first round)
- (Germany) Karsten Kornath (first round)
- (Germany) Tomas Seyler (second round)
- (Austria) Maik Langendorf (first round)

== Draw ==
First round (best of 11 legs); 6 July
1	(England) Adrian Lewis	6
(Germany) Karsten Kornath	0
32	(England) Steve Beaton	6
(England) Anthony Littleton	3
16	(England) Ronnie Baxter	6
(South Africa) Devon Petersen	2
17	(England) Mervyn King	6
(England) Stuart Kellett	3
8	(England) Terry Jenkins	1
(England) Joe Cullen	6
25	(England) Alan Tabern	2
(England) Johnny Haines	6
9	(England) Kevin Painter	6
(Netherlands) Ryan de Vreede	3
24	(England) Colin Osborne	6
(Scotland) Jim Walker	0
5	(Australia) Simon Whitlock	6
(England) Ross Smith	5
28	(Scotland) Peter Wright	5
(Belgium) Ronny Huybrechts	6
12	(Netherlands) Vincent van der Voort	6
(Wales) Jamie Lewis	3
21	(Scotland) Robert Thornton	6
(Austria) Maik Langendorf	1
4	(England) Wes Newton	w/o
(England) Steve Maish	w/d
29	(Netherlands) Co Stompé	1
(England) Mark Dudbridge	6
13	(Australia) Paul Nicholson	2
(Belgium) Kim Huybrechts	6
20	(England) Dave Chisnall	6
(Germany) Kevin Münch	1
2	(England) James Wade	6
(Sweden) Magnus Caris	3
31	(England) Mark Hylton	1
(Netherlands) Jelle Klaasen	6
15	(England) Colin Lloyd	2
(Northern Ireland) Mickey Mansell	6
18	(England) Andy Smith	6
(England) Mick Todd	5
7	(Netherlands) Raymond van Barneveld	6
(England) Ian White	2
26	(Northern Ireland) Brendan Dolan	6
(England) Dean Winstanley	5
10	(England) Justin Pipe	3
(Netherlands) Gino Vos	6
23	(Canada) John Part	3
(Germany) Tomas Seyler	6
6	(England) Andy Hamilton	5
(England) James Hubbard	6
27	(England) Steve Brown	6
(England) Arron Monk	2
11	(England) Mark Walsh	6
(England) Mark Jones	5
22	(England) Denis Ovens	3
(Croatia) Tonči Restović	6
3	(Scotland) Gary Anderson	w/d
(England) Scott Rand	w/o
30	(Wales) Richie Burnett	6
(England) Andy Jenkins	2
14	(England) Wayne Jones	3
(Netherlands) Michael van Gerwen	6
19	(England) Jamie Caven	5
(England) Brian Woods	6

Second round (best of 11 legs); 7 July
1	(England) A. Lewis 87.28	3
32	(England) Beaton 90.27	6
16	(England) Baxter 94.04	5
17	(England) King 90.91	6
(England) Cullen 87.48	5
(England) Haines 85.38	6
9	(England) Painter 87.41	2
24	(England) Osborne 96.93	6
5	(Australia) Whitlock 96.71	6
(Belgium) R. Huybrechts 85.19	1
12	(Netherlands) van der Voort 94.33	4
21	(Scotland) Thornton 92.01	6
4	(England) Newton 82.06	4
(England) Dudbridge 79.92	6
(Belgium) K. Huybrechts 96.59	5
20	(England) Chisnall 95.59	6
2	(England) Wade 93.86	6
(Netherlands) Klaasen 90.23	3
(Northern Ireland) Mansell 75.51	1
18	(England) A. Smith 93.83	6
7	(Netherlands) van Barneveld 89.46	6
26	(Northern Ireland) Dolan 84.65	2
(Netherlands) Vos 83.88	6
(Germany) Seyler 81.47	4
(England) Hubbard 89.84	6
27	(England) Brown 89.93	5
11	(England) Walsh 87.36	6
(Croatia) Restović 75.79	1
(England) Rand 91.09	3
30	(Wales) Burnett 93.07	6
(Netherlands) van Gerwen 86.76	6
(England) Woods 83.90	4

Third round (best of 11 legs); 8 July
32	(England) Beaton 80.70	5
17	(England) King 84.86	6
(England) Haines 97.00	0
24	(England) Osborne 101.33	6
5	(Australia) Whitlock 93.72	6
21	(Scotland) Thornton 88.49	3
(England) Dudbridge 84.46	2
20	(England) Chisnall 100.82	6
2	(England) Wade 93.19	6
18	(England) A. Smith 83.61	2
7	(Netherlands) van Barneveld 103.68	6
(Netherlands) Vos 88.70	2
(England) Hubbard 93.17	6
11	(England) Walsh 80.22	3
30	(Wales) Burnett 95.63	6
(Netherlands) van Gerwen 96.18	2

Quarter-finals (best of 11 legs); 8 July
17	(England) King 105.44	6
24	(England) Osborne 96.03	2
5	(Australia) Whitlock 95.66	5
20	(England) Chisnall 100.63	6
2	(England) Wade 100.15	2
7	(Netherlands) van Barneveld 100.07	6
(England) Hubbard 90.96	2
30	(Wales) Burnett 101.20	6

Semi-finals (best of 11 legs); 8 July
17	(England) King 95.17	3
20	(England) Chisnall 99.69	6
7	(Netherlands) van Barneveld 98.13	6
30	(Wales) Burnett 98.46	4

Final (best of 11 legs); 8 July
20	(England) Chisnall 82.16	4
7	(Netherlands) van Barneveld 93.97	6
