= 2016 Apatin Open darts =

Apatin Open

Tournament information
- Dates: 9 July 2016
- Country: Serbia
- Organisation(s): WDF
- Winner's share: €600

Champion(s)
- (Hungary) Nandor Bezzeg (Hungary) Veronika Ihasz

2016 Apatin Open is a darts tournament, which took take place in Apatin, Serbia on July 9, 2016. 77 men and 9 women participated.

== Results ==
=== Last 16 ===
Final 16
(Hungary)	Nandor Bezzeg	4
(Serbia)	Aco Babic	1
(Croatia)	Tonci Restovic	4
(Serbia)	Strahinja Sarkocevic	1
(Bulgaria)	Miroslav Petrov	4
(Croatia)	Hrvoje Halozar	3
(Serbia)	Darko Skenderovic	4
(Hungary)	Gabor Szitas	2
(Greece)	Kostas Pantelidis	4
(Serbia)	Tihomir Patrik	2
(Serbia)	Oliver Ferenc	4
(Serbia)	Milosh Ivic	1
(Hungary)	Joszef Rucska	4
(Serbia)	Sasa Mrkojevic	1
(Hungary)	Zsolt Adam	4
(Hungary)	Adam Abonyi	2

Quarter-finals
(Hungary)	Nandor Bezzeg	4
(Croatia)	Tonci Restovic	1
(Bulgaria)	Miroslav Petrov	4
(Serbia)	Darko Skenderovic	3
(Greece)	Kostas Pantelidis	4
(Serbia)	Oliver Ferenc	2
(Hungary)	Joszef Rucska	4
(Hungary)	Zsolt Adam	2

Semi-finals
(Hungary)	Nandor Bezzeg	5
(Bulgaria)	Miroslav Petrov	4
(Greece)	Kostas Pantelidis	5
(Hungary)	Joszef Rucska	3

Final
(Hungary)	Nandor Bezzeg	6
(Greece)	Kostas Pantelidis	3

=== Women ===
Round	Player
Winner	(Hungary) Veronika Ihasz
Final	(Hungary) Boglarka Bokor
Semi-finals	(Serbia) Marija Bogunovic
Semi-finals	(Bulgaria) Cvetelina Bozilova
Quarter-finals	(Bulgaria) Nadia Gergova
Quarter-finals	(Hungary) Annamaria Olei
Quarter-finals	(Serbia) Sonja Musikic
Quarter-finals	(Serbia) Tamara Milić
Preliminary	(Bulgaria) Ivanina Ivanova
