= 2024 Dutch Darts Championship =

2024 Elten Safety Shoes Dutch Darts Championship

Tournament information
- Dates: 24–26 May 2024
- Venue: Autotron
- Location: Rosmalen, Netherlands
- Organisation(s): Professional Darts Corporation (PDC)
- Format: Legs
- Prize fund: £175,000
- Winner's share: £30,000
- Nine-dart finish: Ross Smith
- High checkout: 170; Mike De Decker; Michael van Gerwen

Champion(s)
- Josh Rock

The 2024 Dutch Darts Championship, known as the 2024 Elten Safety Shoes Dutch Darts Championship for sponsorship reasons, was a professional darts tournament that took place at the Autotron, Rosmalen, Netherlands from 24 to 26 May 2024. It was the seventh of thirteen European Tour events on the 2024 PDC Pro Tour. It featured a field of 48 players and £175,000 in prize money, with £30,000 going to the winner.

Dave Chisnall was the defending champion after defeating Luke Humphries 8–5 in the 2023 final, but lost to Jonny Clayton 6–3 in the third round.

Josh Rock won his first European Tour title by beating Jonny Clayton 8–4 in the final. Rock became the second Northern Irish player to win a European Tour event.

Ross Smith hit his second nine-darter on the European Tour, and first for 11 years, in his second-round defeat to Dimitri Van den Bergh.

== Prize money ==
The prize fund remained at £175,000, with £30,000 to the winner:

Stage (num. of players)		Prize money
Winner	(1)	£30,000
Runner-up	(1)	£12,000
Semi-finalists	(2)	£8,500
Quarter-finalists	(4)	£6,000
Third round losers	(8)	£4,000
Second round losers	(16)	£2,500*
First round losers	(16)	£1,250*
Total	£175,000	

- Pre-qualified players from the Orders of Merit who lose in their first match of the event shall not be credited with prize money on any Order of Merit. A player who qualifies as a qualifier, but later becomes a seed due to the withdrawal of one or more other players shall be credited with their prize money on all Orders of Merit regardless of how far they progress in the event.

== Qualification and format ==
A massive overhaul in the qualification for the 2024 European Tour events was announced on 7 January.

For the first time, both the PDC Order of Merit and the PDC Pro Tour Order of Merit rankings were used to determine 32 of the 48 entrants for the event.

The top 16 on the PDC Order of Merit qualified, along with the highest 16 ranked players on the PDC Pro Tour Order of Merit (after the PDC Order of Merit players were removed). From those 32 players, the 16 highest ranked players on the PDC Pro Tour Order of Merit were seeded for the event.

The seedings were confirmed on 1 May.

The remaining 16 places went to players from four qualifying events – 10 from the Tour Card Holder Qualifier (to be held on 8 May), four from the Host Nation Qualifier (to be held on 23 May), one from the Nordic & Baltic Associate Nation Qualifier (held on the 6 April) and one from the East European Associate Member Qualifier (held on the 7 April).

Michael Smith and Nathan Aspinall withdrew and were replaced by Ritchie Edhouse and Jermaine Wattimena. Jonny Clayton moved up to become the 16th seed.

The following players took part in the tournament:

Seeded Players

1. Dave Chisnall (third round)
2. Damon Heta (second round)
3. Gerwyn Price (quarter-finals)
4. Danny Noppert (quarter-finals)
5. Michael van Gerwen (semi-finals)
6. Josh Rock (champion)
7. Ross Smith (second round)
8. Ryan Searle (quarter-finals)
9. Stephen Bunting (second round)
10. Martin Schindler (semi-finals)
11. Peter Wright (second round)
12. Chris Dobey (third round)
13. Ricardo Pietreczko (second round)
14. Gian van Veen (third round)
15. Daryl Gurney (second round)
16. Jonny Clayton (runner-up)

Order of Merit Qualifiers
- Dimitri Van den Bergh (third round)
- Dirk van Duijvenbode (second round)
- Joe Cullen (first round)
- Ryan Joyce (first round)
- Raymond van Barneveld (first round)
- Andrew Gilding (second round)
- James Wade (second round)
- Gabriel Clemens (first round)
- Luke Woodhouse (quarter-finals)
- Brendan Dolan (second round)
- Mike De Decker (first round)
- José de Sousa (first round)
- Callan Rydz (first round)
- Kevin Doets (second round)

Tour Card Qualifier
- Madars Razma (first round)
- William O'Connor (first round)
- Cameron Menzies (third round)
- Mickey Mansell (second round)
- Ryan Meikle (first round)
- Niels Zonneveld (second round)
- Dom Taylor (second round)
- Owen Bates (first round)
- Jeffrey de Graaf (third round)
- Haupai Puha (first round)
Host Nation Qualifier
- Moreno Blom (second round)
- Damian Mol (first round)
- Christian Kist (first round)
- Marvin van Velzen (second round)
Nordic & Baltic Qualifier
- Teemu Harju (first round)

East European Qualifier
- Jiří Brejcha (first round)

Reserve List
- Ritchie Edhouse (third round)
- Jermaine Wattimena (third round)

== Draw ==
First round (best of 11 legs); 24 May
Niels Zonneveld 83.67	6
Haupai Puha 86.37	5
Christian Kist 85.96	5
Marvin van Velzen 86.31	6
Teemu Harju 78.79	0
James Wade 85.08	6
Madars Razma 89.29	3
Jeffrey de Graaf 91.24	6
Andrew Gilding 86.28	6
Damian Mol 88.17	5
Joe Cullen 94.49	5
Alt	Jermaine Wattimena 93.74	6
Mike De Decker 91.14	5
Kevin Doets 91.48	6
Moreno Blom 100.26	6
Ryan Joyce 95.93	3
Alt	Ritchie Edhouse 84.95	6
Jiří Brejcha 79.29	3
Ryan Meikle 84.00	5
Luke Woodhouse 85.20	6
Dimitri Van den Bergh 102.93	6
Gabriel Clemens 100.76	4
Brendan Dolan 83.55	6
Owen Bates 78.22	3
William O'Connor 91.88	2
Mickey Mansell 91.50	6
Dom Taylor 102.26	6
José de Sousa 95.33	3
Callan Rydz 90.00	3
Dirk van Duijvenbode 95.48	6
Raymond van Barneveld 94.81	1
Cameron Menzies 103.87	6

Second round (best of 11 legs); 25 May
1	Dave Chisnall 100.75	6
Niels Zonneveld 85.82	2
16	Jonny Clayton 99.17	6
Marvin van Velzen 92.96	4
8	Ryan Searle 100.02	6
James Wade 93.58	3
9	Stephen Bunting 89.98	3
Jeffrey de Graaf 93.58	6
4	Danny Noppert 93.97	6
Andrew Gilding 96.35	5
13	Ricardo Pietreczko 82.02	5
Alt	Jermaine Wattimena 95.40	6
5	Michael van Gerwen 96.97	6
Kevin Doets 90.24	0
12	Chris Dobey 95.94	6
Moreno Blom 77.57	0
2	Damon Heta 82.03	5
Alt	Ritchie Edhouse 88.47	6
15	Daryl Gurney 92.20	4
Luke Woodhouse 99.27	6
7	Ross Smith 93.35	4
Dimitri Van den Bergh 94.38	6
10	Martin Schindler 96.72	6
Brendan Dolan 94.24	4
3	Gerwyn Price 101.33	6
Mickey Mansell 91.66	0
14	Gian van Veen 93.79	6
Dom Taylor 92.35	5
6	Josh Rock 104.83	6
Dirk van Duijvenbode 93.61	3
11	Peter Wright 102.33	3
Cameron Menzies 99.42	6

Third round (best of 11 legs); 26 May
1	Chisnall 100.47	3
16	Clayton 93.74	6
8	Searle 100.59	6
de Graaf 93.39	1
4	Noppert 99.67	6
Alt	Wattimena 94.82	5
5	van Gerwen 103.52	6
12	Dobey 91.39	1
Alt	Edhouse 97.19	5
Woodhouse 98.33	6
Van den Bergh 98.36	4
10	Schindler 102.17	6
3	Price 105.06	6
14	Veen 92.66	1
6	Rock 96.42	6
Menzies 98.52	5

Quarter-finals (best of 11 legs); 26 May
16	Clayton 99.49	6
8	Searle 91.51	2
4	Noppert 90.15	1
5	van Gerwen 101.73	6
Woodhouse 100.79	5
10	Schindler 106.04	6
3	Price 99.92	3
6	Rock 101.75	6

Semi-finals (best of 13 legs); 26 May
16	Clayton 96.61	7
5	van Gerwen 98.93	6
10	Schindler 89.18	3
6	Rock 93.54	7

Final (best of 15 legs); 26 May
16	Clayton 90.59	4
6	Rock 89.89	8
