= 2014 German Darts Masters =

Tournament information
- Dates: 19–21 April 2014
- Venue: Maritim Hotel
- Location: Berlin
- Country: Germany
- Organisation(s): PDC
- Format: Legs
- Prize fund: £100,000
- Winner's share: £20,000

Champion(s)
- (England) Phil Taylor

The 2014 German Darts Masters was the third of eight PDC European Tour events on the 2014 PDC Pro Tour. The tournament took place at the Maritim Hotel in Berlin, Germany, between 19–21 April 2014. It featured a field of 48 players and £100,000 in prize money, with £20,000 going to the winner.

Phil Taylor won the title by beating Michael van Gerwen 6–4 in the final.

== Prize money ==
Stage (num. of players)		Prize money
Winner	(1)	£20,000
Runner-up	(1)	£8,000
Semi-finalists	(2)	£4,000
Quarter-finalists	(4)	£3,000
Third round losers	(8)	£2,000
Second round losers	(16)	£1,250
First round losers	(16)	£1,000
Total	£100,000	

== Qualification and format ==
The top 16 players from the PDC ProTour Order of Merit on 17 March 2014 automatically qualified for the event. The remaining 32 places went to players from three qualifying events - 20 from the UK Qualifier (held in Crawley on 21 March), eight from the European Qualifier and four from the Host Nation Qualifier (held at the venue the day before the event started).

The following players took part in the tournament:

Top 16
1. (Netherlands) Michael van Gerwen (runner-up)
2. (England) Dave Chisnall (third round)
3. (Northern Ireland) Brendan Dolan (third round)
4. (Belgium) Kim Huybrechts (third round)
5. (Scotland) Peter Wright (second round)
6. (Scotland) Robert Thornton (second round)
7. (England) Jamie Caven (second round)
8. (England) Steve Beaton (quarter-finals)
9. (England) Wes Newton (third round)
10. (England) Mervyn King (second round)
11. (England) Ian White (third round)
12. (Australia) Simon Whitlock (third round)
13. (England) Adrian Lewis (semi-finals)
14. (England) Justin Pipe (second round)
15. (England) Phil Taylor (winner)
16. (England) Andy Hamilton (second round)

UK Qualifier
- (Australia) Paul Nicholson (second round)
- (England) Joe Murnan (first round)
- (England) Ronnie Baxter (second round)
- (England) Andy Smith (second round)
- (England) Michael Smith (quarter-finals)
- (England) Peter Hudson (first round)
- (Wales) Jamie Lewis (first round)
- (England) Alex Roy (first round)
- (England) Ross Smith (first round)
- (England) Steve Douglas (second round)
- (England) Stephen Bunting (semi-finals)
- (England) Steve Hine (first round)
- (England) Dean Winstanley (first round)
- (England) Steve West (second round)
- (Wales) Mark Webster (first round)
- (England) David Pallett (third round)
- (England) Kirk Shepherd (second round)
- (Scotland) John Henderson (quarter-finals)
- (England) Andrew Gilding (third round)
- (Northern Ireland) Mickey Mansell (first round)

European Qualifier
- (Finland) Jarkko Komula (second round)
- (Netherlands) Raymond van Barneveld (first round)
- (Finland) Jani Haavisto (second round)
- (Belgium) Ronny Huybrechts (first round)
- (Netherlands) Jelle Klaasen (first round)
- (Netherlands) Vincent van der Voort (quarter-finals)
- (Netherlands) Jerry Hendriks (first round)
- (Sweden) Magnus Caris (second round)

Host Nation Qualifier
- (Germany) Andree Welge (first round)
- (Germany) Max Hopp (first round)
- (Germany) Marcel Hausotter (first round)
- (Germany) Jyhan Artut (second round)

== Draw ==
First round (best of 11 legs); 19 April
(Netherlands) Jelle Klaasen 90.36	3
(Germany) Jyhan Artut 92.13	6
(Wales) Jamie Lewis 91.97	1
(England) David Pallett 94.93	6
(England) Dean Winstanley 86.04	5
(England) Steve Douglas 87.08	6
(Belgium) Ronny Huybrechts 90.55	5
(Finland) Jarkko Komula 88.67	6
(Scotland) John Henderson 92.85	6
(England) Steve Hine 86.11	4
(Finland) Jani Haavisto 88.22	6
(Germany) Andree Welge 87.05	1
(England) Alex Roy 81.82	2
(Australia) Paul Nicholson 95.41	6
(England) Joe Murnan 81.80	2
(England) Andy Smith 86.01	6
(England) Steve West 92.02	6
(Germany) Max Hopp 83.28	0
(Netherlands) Jerry Hendriks 77.41	4
(Sweden) Magnus Caris 88.45	6
(England) Peter Hudson 93.18	2
(England) Andrew Gilding 100.03	6
(Northern Ireland) Mickey Mansell 93.14	2
(England) Michael Smith 104.08	6
(Netherlands) Vincent van der Voort 92.96	6
(Wales) Mark Webster 86.40	4
(Netherlands) Raymond van Barneveld 90.40	2
(England) Ronnie Baxter 90.56	6
(England) Kirk Shepherd 81.36	6
(Germany) Marcel Hausotter 73.95	1
(England) Ross Smith 81.36	1
(England) Stephen Bunting 89.10	6

Second round (best of 11 legs); 20 April
1	(Netherlands) Michael van Gerwen 101.33	6
(Germany) Jyhan Artut 89.00	0
16	(England) Andy Hamilton 83.98	4
(England) David Pallett 87.59	6
8	(England) Steve Beaton 87.90	6
(England) Steve Douglas 87.53	2
9	(England) Wes Newton 102.73	6
(Finland) Jarkko Komula 92.73	4
5	(Scotland) Peter Wright 85.63	5
(Scotland) John Henderson 90.07	6
12	(Australia) Simon Whitlock 108.21	6
(Finland) Jani Haavisto 100.42	4
4	(Belgium) Kim Huybrechts 82.46	6
(Australia) Paul Nicholson 78.60	1
13	(England) Adrian Lewis 92.39	6
(England) Andy Smith 90.00	3
2	(England) Dave Chisnall 96.22	6
(England) Steve West 83.67	3
15	(England) Phil Taylor 93.94	6
(Sweden) Magnus Caris 83.53	0
7	(England) Jamie Caven 84.71	1
(England) Andrew Gilding 98.75	6
10	(England) Mervyn King 89.57	5
(England) Michael Smith 92.45	6
6	(Scotland) Robert Thornton 82.47	3
(Netherlands) Vincent van der Voort 96.50	6
11	(England) Ian White 95.35	6
(England) Ronnie Baxter 91.58	5
3	(Northern Ireland) Brendan Dolan 92.94	6
(England) Kirk Shepherd 90.00	4
14	(England) Justin Pipe 94.52	4
(England) Stephen Bunting 96.22	6

Third round (best of 11 legs); 21 April
1	(Netherlands) van Gerwen 100.34	6
(England) Pallett 93.00	3
8	(England) Beaton 99.00	6
9	(England) Newton 90.93	2
(Scotland) Henderson 106.12	6
12	(Australia) Whitlock 89.57	2
4	(Belgium) K. Huybrechts 82.29	2
13	(England) A. Lewis 91.08	6
2	(England) Chisnall 94.01	3
15	(England) Taylor 104.78	6
(England) Gilding 90.95	1
(England) M. Smith 99.21	6
(Netherlands) van der Voort 93.75	6
11	(England) White 92.00	5
3	(Northern Ireland) Dolan 99.83	3
(England) Bunting 100.19	6

Quarter-finals (best of 11 legs); 21 April
1	(Netherlands) van Gerwen 94.93	6
8	(England) Beaton 84.58	0
(Scotland) Henderson 85.79	2
13	(England) A. Lewis 90.69	6
15	(England) Taylor 109.98	6
(England) M. Smith 92.23	0
(Netherlands) van der Voort 99.46	1
(England) Bunting 100.70	6

Semi-finals (best of 11 legs); 21 April
1	(Netherlands) van Gerwen 100.50	6
13	(England) A. Lewis 94.55	3
15	(England) Taylor 102.90	6
(England) Bunting 92.27	3

Final (best of 11 legs); 21 April
1	(Netherlands) van Gerwen 103.19	4
15	(England) Taylor 107.12	6
