= Mickey Mansell =

Irish darts player (born 1973)

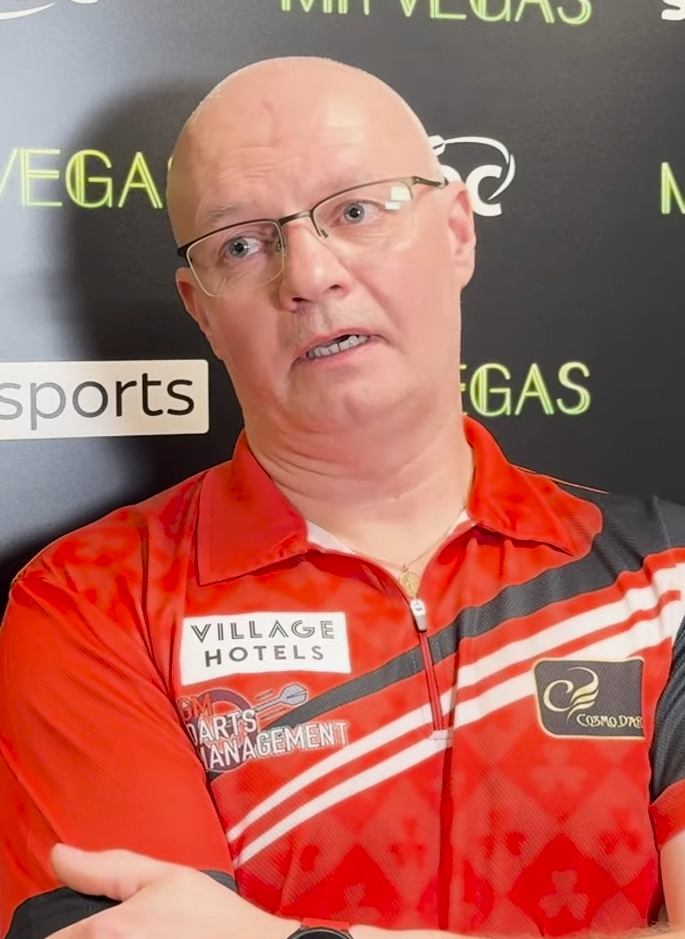
- Mansell at the 2024 Grand Slam of Darts

Personal information
- Full name: Michael Mansell
- Nickname: "Clonoe Cyclone"
- Born: 31 August 1973 (age 53) Dungannon, Northern Ireland
- Home town: Clonoe, Northern Ireland

Sport
- Sport: Darts
- Playing since: 1993
- Darts: 25g Cosmo
- Laterality: Left-handed
- Walk-on music: "Maniac 2000" by Mark McCabe

Organisation (see split in darts)
- BDO: 2006–2010
- PDC: 2010–present (Tour Card: 2011–present)
- Current world ranking: (PDC) 42 ▼1 (29 October 2026)

WDF major events – best performances
- World Masters: Last 128: 2006

PDC premier events – best performances
- World Championship: Last 64: 2013, 2015, 2021, 2023, 2024
- World Grand Prix: Last 16: 2014
- UK Open: Last 32: 2013, 2019
- Grand Slam: Semi-final: 2024
- PC Finals: Last 32: 2017

Other tournament wins
- Years
Ireland Autumn Classic	2009
Tom Kirby Memorial Irish Matchplay	2010
Players Championships
2018 PC8

Michael Mansell (born 31 August 1973) is an Irish darts player who competes in Professional Darts Corporation (PDC) events. He reached his first major semi-final at the 2024 Grand Slam. Mansell won his maiden PDC ranking title at Players Championship 8 on the 2018 PDC Pro Tour.

Mansell competed at the PDC World Cup of Darts for Northern Ireland from 2012 to 2015, reaching the semi-finals in 2014. He competed at the 2026 World Cup representing Ireland.

== Career ==
In October 2010, Mansell reached the semi-finals of a Players Championship in Dublin. A week later, he qualified for the 2011 PDC World Darts Championship after defeating Stephen Byrne to win the Tom Kirby Memorial Irish Matchplay. He was beaten in the preliminary round by New Zealand's Preston Ridd 4–0.

Mansell qualified for the 2011 PDC Pro Tour as one of four semi-finalists from the third day of the Pro Tour's Q-School.

Mansell qualified for the 2011 UK Open, held in June, finishing inside the top 96 after the 8 UK Open qualifiers were held. At the tournament he lost in the last 64 to James Wade 9–2.

He represented Northern Ireland alongside Brendan Dolan in the 2012 PDC World Cup of Darts and together they reached the quarter-finals, where they were defeated by the Netherlands 4–0, having beaten Denmark in the second round. Mansell had a good season in the new European Tour events by qualifying for three of the five tournaments. He lost in the last 32 of the European Darts Open, and in the last 16 of both the German Darts Championship (beat Jamie Caven and Dean Winstanley, before losing to Wes Newton) and the German Darts Masters (beat Mervyn King and Paul Nicholson, before losing to Adrian Lewis). Mansell played in his first World Grand Prix in October as he was one of the two Irish qualifiers. He was beaten by Paul Nicholson 0–2 in sets, averaging just 64.48 in the event where a double must be hit to start and end every leg.

Mansell qualified for the 2013 World Championship by taking the 14th place of the 16 that were available through the ProTour Order of Merit for the highest non-qualified players. In his second World Championship he lost to 15-time winner Phil Taylor 0–3 in the first round, as Mansell won only one leg during the match and averaged 78.46. Mansell was ranked world number 51 after the tournament. In his second World Cup of Darts with Brendan Dolan the pair were beaten 4–5 in the last 16 by the Croatian duo of Robert Marijanović and Tonči Restović. Mansell reached the quarter-finals of a PDC event for the first time since October 2010 in May at the third Players Championship, but lost 4–6 to Paul Nicholson. Mansell beat Co Stompé and Conan Whitehead to face Michael van Gerwen in the fourth round of the UK Open, which he lost 3–9. Mansell was again a qualifier for the World Grand Prix and had a superb opportunity to achieve the biggest win of his career to date as he had three match darts against world number four Simon Whitlock in the deciding leg of the final set but missed them all. Mansell later revealed how this match impacted his darts for the subsequent year ahead as every time he played it was on his mind. At the Dutch Darts Masters he beat Tonči Restović and Gino Vos, before losing 6–4 to Kim Huybrechts in the third round.

Mansell beat Ben Burton and Dean Stewart to reach the third round of the 2014 UK Open but there lost to James Wade 9–1. In June, Mansell and Dolan beat Peter Wright and Robert Thornton from Scotland in the quarter-finals of the World Cup of Darts. In the semis, Dolan edged world number one Michael van Gerwen 4–3, but Mansell lost 4–0 to Van Barneveld to send the match into a deciding doubles game in which the Dutch pair averaged an incredible 117.88 to progress with a 4–0 whitewash. He won his first match at the World Grand Prix in three attempts by eliminating Ian White 2–0 (sets). Mansell then met Gary Anderson in the second round and won the first set, but was ultimately beaten 3–1 after losing nine successive legs.

Mansell suffered a 3–0 loss to Kim Huybrechts in the first round of the 2015 World Championship. Mansell and Dolan met the Netherlands' Van Gerwen and Van Barneveld for the second successive year at the World Cup, this time in the quarter-finals. Dolan lost 4–2 to Van Gerwen, but Mansell defeated Van Barneveld 4–3 meaning a doubles match was required and, for the second year in a row, Northern Ireland were whitewashed 4–0. Mansell qualified for four European Tour events and was knocked out in the second round in all of them.

Mansell's four World Cup appearances in a row ended in 2016 after Daryl Gurney overtook him as Northern Ireland's second highest player on the Order of Merit, behind Brendan Dolan. Three last 32 and three last 16 exits saw him qualify for the expanded Players Championship Finals and he lost 6–3 to Kim Huybrechts in the first round. Mansell dropped out of the top 64 during 2016 and so played in 2017 Q School, where he finished sixth on the Order of Merit to reclaim his PDC place.

Mansell lost his Tour card after season 2021, battling with injuries during that year. Immediately he regained his Tour card in PDC UK Q-School 2022 via UK Q-School Order of Merit, where he placed on 11th place with 6 points.

On 15 December 2022, at the 2023 PDC World Championship, Mansell beat Ben Robb but was defeated in the second round by Peter Wright 3–0 in sets.

At the 2024 PDC World Championship, Mansell faced Brendan Dolan. Dolan prevailed as the winner 3–2.

In the opening Players Championship event of 2024, Mansell defeated Josh Payne 6–2 in legs. In his second round match against Krzysztof Ratajski, Mansell hit a nine-dart finish, en route to another 6–2 victory. In the third round he defeated Daryl Gurney 6–5 but in the last 16, Nick Kenny beat Mansell 6–5.

At the 2024 Grand Slam of Darts Mansell reached his first major semi final by defeating Cameron Menzies 16–15 in a deciding leg in the quarter-finals. He lost to Martin Lukeman 16–12 in the semi-finals.

In May 2026, it was announced Mansell would represent the Republic of Ireland team at the 2026 PDC World Cup of Darts alongside William O'Connor.

== World Championship results ==
=== PDC World Championship ===
- 2011: Preliminary round (lost to Preston Ridd 0–4) (legs)
- 2013: First round (lost to Phil Taylor 0–3 (sets)
- 2015: First round (lost to Kim Huybrechts 0–3)
- 2019: First round (lost to Jim Long 1–3)
- 2020: First round (lost to Seigo Asada 0–3)
- 2021: Second round (lost to Ricky Evans 1–3)
- 2023: Second round (lost to Peter Wright 0–3)
- 2024: Second round (lost to Brendan Dolan 2–3)
- 2025: Second round (lost to Jonny Clayton 2–3)
- 2026: First round (lost to Leonard Gates 2–3)

== Performance timeline ==
=== BDO ===
Tournament	2006	2008	2010
BDO Ranked televised events
World Masters	2R	1R	1R

=== PDC ===
Tournament	2011	2012	2013	2014	2015	2016	2017	2018	2019	2020	2021	2022	2023	2024	2025	2026
PDC Ranked televised events
World Championship	Prel.	DNQ	1R	DNQ	1R	Did not qualify			1R	1R	2R	DNQ	2R	2R	2R	1R
World Masters	Did not qualify														Prel.	WD
UK Open	3R	3R	4R	3R	Did not qualify			1R	5R	3R	3R	1R	3R	4R	3R	3R
World Grand Prix	DNQ	1R	1R	2R	Did not qualify											
Grand Slam	Did not qualify													SF	DNQ	
Players Championship Finals	Did not qualify					1R	2R	1R	1R	1R	DNQ	1R	1R	DNQ	1R	
PDC Non-ranked televised events
World Cup	NH	QF	2R	SF	QF	DNP										QF
Career statistics
Season-end ranking	90	57	44	42	50	62	95	63	58	54	69	77	56	43	46	

==== European Tour ====
Season	1	2	3	4	5	6	7	8	9	10	11	12	13	14	15
2012	ADO; DNQ	GDC; 3R	EDO; 2R	GDM; 3R	DDM; DNQ										
2013	Did not qualify				GDT; 1R	GDC; DNQ	GDM; 1R	DDM; 3R							
2014	GDC; DNQ	DDM; QF	GDM; 1R	Did not qualify				EDT; 1R							
2015	DNQ		GDM; 2R	DDM; DNQ	IDO; 2R	DNQ		EDM; 2R	EDG; 2R						
2016	Did not qualify									GDC; 1R					
2017	Did not qualify					EDM; 1R	Did not qualify			GDG; 1R	DNQ				
2018	Did not qualify							DDO; 1R	Did not qualify			IDO; 2R	EDT; 2R		
2019	EDO; DNQ	GDC; 1R	GDG; DNQ	GDO; 2R	DNQ		DDM; 2R	Did not qualify				IDO; 1R	GDT; DNQ		
2022	Did not qualify				EDO; 1R	CDO; 3R	EDG; 2R	DDC; 2R	Did not qualify						
2023	Did not qualify				ADO; 3R	Did not qualify				EDM; 2R	GDO; 1R	HDT; DNQ	GDC; 1R		
2024	Did not qualify			EDG; 2R	DNQ		DDC; 2R	EDO; DNQ	GDC; 2R	Did not qualify					
2025	Did not qualify			GDG; 2R	ADO; 1R	EDG; DNQ	DDC; 3R	EDO; 2R	BSD; 2R	Did not qualify					
2026	PDO; 1R	EDT; DNQ	BDO; 2R	GDG; DNQ	EDG; 2R	DNQ				EDO; 2R	DNQ		FDT; 1R	SDT; DNQ	DDC; 1R

==== Players Championships ====
Season	1	2	3	4	5	6	7	8	9	10	11	12	13	14	15	16	17	18	19	20	21	22	23	24	25	26	27	28	29	30	31	32	33	34	35	36	37
2010	Did not participate																												DUB; 1R	DUB; SF	DNP						
2011	Did not participate						DER; 1R	DER; 4R	CRA; 3R	CRA; 2R	VIE; 1R	VIE; 3R	CRA; 1R	CRA; 2R	BAR; 2R	BAR; 2R	NUL; 2R	NUL; 2R	ONT; DNP		DER; 2R	DER; 3R	NUL; 4R	NUL; 1R	DUB; 2R	DUB; 1R	KIL; 3R	GLA; DNP		ALI; 3R	ALI; 1R	CRA; 2R	CRA; 1R	WIG; 1R	WIG; 3R		
2012	ALI; 2R	ALI; 2R	REA; 1R	REA; 2R	CRA; 1R	CRA; 2R	BIR; 1R	BIR; 1R	CRA; 1R	CRA; 2R	BAR; 2R	BAR; 1R	DUB; 1R	DUB; 2R	KIL; 1R	KIL; 1R	CRA; 2R	CRA; 2R	BAR; 2R	BAR; 1R																	
2013	WIG; 2R	WIG; 1R	WIG; QF	WIG; 1R	CRA; 3R	CRA; 1R	BAR; 1R	BAR; 1R	DUB; 2R	DUB; 1R	KIL; 2R	KIL; 1R	WIG; 1R	WIG; 1R	BAR; 3R	BAR; 2R																					
2014	BAR; 1R	BAR; 1R	CRA; 4R	CRA; 2R	WIG; 1R	WIG; 2R	WIG; 1R	WIG; 2R	CRA; 4R	CRA; 2R	COV; 2R	COV; 3R	CRA; 1R	CRA; 1R	DUB; 1R	DUB; 1R	CRA; 2R	CRA; 3R	COV; 1R	COV; 1R																	
2015	BAR; 3R	BAR; 2R	BAR; 1R	BAR; 2R	BAR; 2R	COV; 3R	COV; 3R	COV; 2R	CRA; 2R	CRA; 2R	BAR; DNP		WIG; 1R	WIG; 2R	BAR; 1R	BAR; 2R	DUB; 1R	DUB; 3R	COV; 2R	COV; 3R																	
2016	BAR; 2R	BAR; 2R	BAR; 1R	BAR; 2R	BAR; 2R	BAR; 1R	BAR; 3R	COV; 1R	COV; 1R	BAR; 1R	BAR; 3R	BAR; 1R	BAR; 4R	BAR; 1R	BAR; 3R	BAR; 4R	DUB; 4R	DUB; 2R	BAR; 2R	BAR; 1R																	
2017	BAR; 2R	BAR; 1R	BAR; 1R	BAR; 1R	MIL; 4R	MIL; 1R	BAR; 2R	BAR; 2R	WIG; 1R	WIG; 2R	MIL; 3R	MIL; 4R	WIG; 2R	WIG; 1R	BAR; 4R	BAR; 1R	BAR; 2R	BAR; 1R	DUB; 3R	DUB; 1R	BAR; 2R	BAR; 1R															
2018	BAR; 1R	BAR; 2R	BAR; 1R	BAR; 2R	MIL; 2R	MIL; 3R	BAR; 1R	BAR; W	WIG; 1R	WIG; QF	MIL; 3R	MIL; QF	WIG; 3R	WIG; 3R	BAR; 1R	BAR; 1R	BAR; 1R	BAR; 1R	DUB; 3R	DUB; 3R	BAR; 2R	BAR; 1R															
2019	WIG; 3R	WIG; 2R	WIG; 1R	WIG; 2R	BAR; 1R	BAR; 3R	WIG; 1R	WIG; 1R	BAR; 3R	BAR; 2R	BAR; 2R	BAR; 2R	BAR; 1R	BAR; 1R	BAR; 1R	BAR; 3R	WIG; 1R	WIG; 2R	BAR; 3R	BAR; 1R	HIL; QF	HIL; 2R	BAR; 2R	BAR; 1R	BAR; 1R	BAR; 1R	DUB; 2R	DUB; 2R	BAR; 1R	BAR; 1R							
2020	BAR; 4R	BAR; QF	WIG; 1R	WIG; 1R	WIG; 2R	WIG; 3R	BAR; 2R	BAR; 3R	MIL; 1R	MIL; 3R	MIL; 3R	MIL; 2R	MIL; 4R	NIE; 1R	NIE; 1R	NIE; 1R	NIE; 1R	NIE; 2R	COV; 2R	COV; 4R	COV; 1R	COV; 2R	COV; 2R														
2021	BOL; 2R	BOL; 3R	BOL; 1R	BOL; 1R	MIL; 1R	MIL; 1R	MIL; 2R	MIL; 1R	NIE; 1R	NIE; 2R	NIE; 3R	NIE; 2R	MIL; 4R	MIL; 1R	MIL; 1R	MIL; 1R	COV; 2R	COV; 2R	COV; 1R	COV; 3R	BAR; 1R	BAR; 1R	BAR; 1R	BAR; QF	BAR; 1R	BAR; 1R	BAR; 1R	BAR; 2R	BAR; 2R	BAR; 1R							
2022	BAR; 1R	BAR; 1R	WIG; 1R	WIG; 1R	BAR; 1R	BAR; 1R	NIE; 2R	NIE; 2R	BAR; 1R	BAR; 1R	BAR; 1R	BAR; 1R	BAR; 4R	WIG; 1R	WIG; 3R	NIE; 2R	NIE; 2R	BAR; 4R	BAR; 2R	BAR; 1R	BAR; 4R	BAR; 2R	BAR; 1R	BAR; 4R	BAR; 2R	BAR; 2R	BAR; 2R	BAR; 2R	BAR; 3R	BAR; 2R							
2023	BAR; 2R	BAR; 2R	BAR; 1R	BAR; 1R	BAR; 1R	BAR; 2R	HIL; QF	HIL; 1R	WIG; 2R	WIG; 1R	LEI; DNP		HIL; 2R	HIL; QF	LEI; 1R	LEI; 2R	HIL; 1R	HIL; 2R	BAR; 1R	BAR; 2R	BAR; 1R	BAR; 3R	BAR; 2R	BAR; 1R	BAR; 2R	BAR; 1R	BAR; 1R	BAR; SF	BAR; 1R	BAR; 4R							
2024	WIG; 4R	WIG; 1R	LEI; 1R	LEI; 3R	HIL; 1R	HIL; 1R	LEI; 3R	LEI; 1R	HIL; 2R	HIL; 1R	HIL; 1R	HIL; 1R	MIL; 1R	MIL; 1R	MIL; 1R	MIL; 1R	MIL; 1R	MIL; 3R	MIL; 2R	WIG; 1R	WIG; 2R	MIL; 3R	MIL; 2R	WIG; 1R	WIG; 2R	WIG; 1R	WIG; 2R	WIG; 4R	LEI; 2R	LEI; 2R							
2025	WIG; 2R	WIG; 2R	ROS; 4R	ROS; 4R	LEI; 1R	LEI; 1R	HIL; 2R	HIL; 2R	LEI; 1R	LEI; 1R	LEI; 1R	LEI; 2R	ROS; 2R	ROS; QF	HIL; 1R	HIL; 1R	LEI; 1R	LEI; 2R	LEI; 2R	LEI; 2R	LEI; 1R	HIL; 2R	HIL; 2R	MIL; 1R	MIL; 1R	HIL; 4R	HIL; 1R	LEI; 2R	LEI; 1R	LEI; QF	WIG; 1R	WIG; 4R	WIG; 3R	WIG; 1R			
2026	HIL; 3R	HIL; 2R	WIG; 2R	WIG; 1R	LEI; 1R	LEI; 1R	LEI; 1R	LEI; 2R	WIG; 1R	WIG; 1R	MIL; 1R	MIL; 1R	HIL; 1R	HIL; 3R	LEI; 3R	LEI; 2R	LEI; 3R	LEI; 1R	MIL; QF	MIL; 4R	WIG; 3R	WIG; 4R	LEI; 1R	LEI; QF	HIL; 3R	HIL; 3R	LEI; QF	LEI; 1R	ROS; 1R	ROS; 3R	ROS; 3R	ROS; 3R	LEI; 3R	LEI; 1R			

Performance Table Legend
W	Won the tournament	F	Finalist	SF	Semifinalist	QF	Quarterfinalist	#R; RR; Prel.	Lost in # round Round-robin; Preliminary round	DQ	Disqualified
DNQ	Did not qualify	DNP	Did not participate	WD	Withdrew	NH	Tournament not held	#R; RR; Prel.	Lost in # round Round-robin; Preliminary round	NYF	Not yet founded
