= Gino Vos =

Dutch darts player

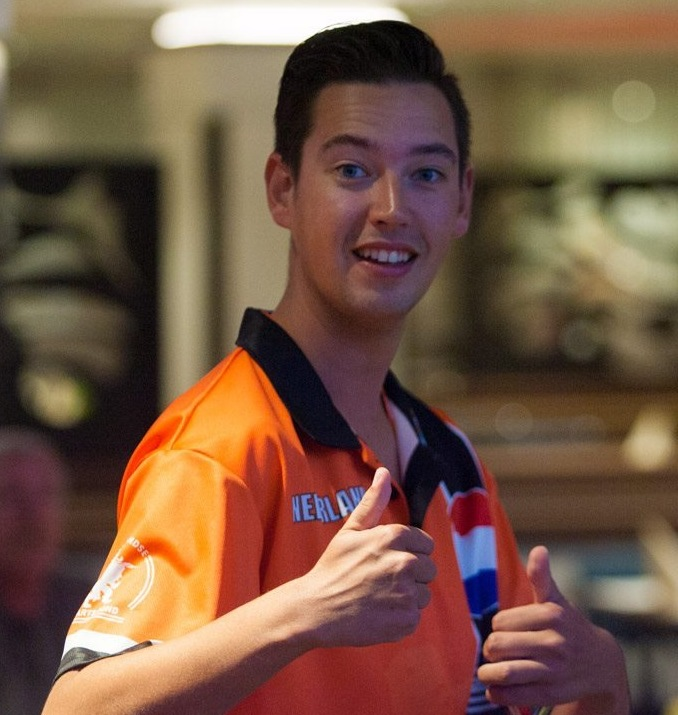

Personal information
- Nickname: The Fox
- Born: 6 July 1990 (age 36) Oss, Netherlands

Sport
- Sport: Darts
- Playing since: 2004
- Laterality: Right-handed
- Walk-on music: Geno by Dexy's Midnight Runners

Organisation (see split in darts)
- BDO: 2008–2011, 2015–2020
- PDC: 2011–2015, 2021 Q School
- WDF: 2015-

WDF major events – best performances
- World Championship: Last 32: 2020
- World Masters: Quarter Final: 2009
- Finder Masters: Group Stage: 2010

PDC premier events – best performances
- World Championship: Last 64: 2013
- UK Open: Last 96: 2021
- European Championship: Last 32: 2012

Other tournament wins
- Years
Dortmund Open	2009
PDC World West European Qualifying Event	2013
Willemstad Open	2011

Gino Vos (born 6 July 1990) is a Dutch professional darts player.

== Career ==
Vos first came to prominence as an 18-year-old in the 2008 Czech Open, getting to the final before losing to Dave Prins 6–4. His next major success came in the 2009 World Masters as a 19-year-old. He defeated such players as Ross Smith in the last 72, before knocking out the then-BDO World Champion Ted Hankey by 3 sets to 1 in the last 16. His run came to an end, however, as he was beaten 3–1 by eventual winner Martin Adams in the quarter-finals.

Vos has also played in European events on the PDC Pro Tour. His best result came in the 2011 PDC Youth Tour Event at Nuland, Netherlands on 18 June 2011 as he beat fellow countryman Michael van Gerwen 4–0 in the semi-finals before losing 4–2 to Joe Cullen.

In 2012, Vos earned a place in the Austrian Darts Open in Vienna by defeating Riccardo Pigliapoco and Toon Greebe in the European qualifier. He played Wayne Jones in the first round and beat the world number 14, 6–3, but then lost 6–4 to Justin Pipe in round two. He also qualified for the third European Darts Open with a win over Jerry Hendriks, and faced Pipe again in the first round in Düsseldorf, this time winning 6–3. He then beat fellow qualifier Tomas Seyler 6–4, before losing to compatriot Raymond van Barneveld 6–2 in the last 16. Vos played Dave Chisnall in the first round of the European Championship and was beaten 6–3, but exacted his revenge a month later by beating him 6–1 in the first round of the Dutch Darts Masters. A reverse of this scoreline followed in the second round, at the hands of Jamie Caven.

Vos qualified for the 2013 World Championship by finishing sixth on the European Order of Merit, taking the third of four places that were awarded to the highest non-qualified players. In his first appearance at the World Championship he faced reigning two-time champion Adrian Lewis in the first round and made a perfect start to the match as he took the first set to nil. He lost the next set and then missed two darts to lead 2–1, instead going on to lose 3–1. He was ranked world number 64 after the tournament. Vos qualified for the UK Open largely thanks to reaching the last 16 of the fourth qualifier where he lost 6–2 to Joe Cullen. He came through a preliminary round match against Alan Derrett, before being defeated 5–1 by Connie Finnan in the first round. He reached the main draw of two European Tour events during the year, losing 6–2 to Phil Taylor in the opening round of the Gibraltar Darts Trophy, and beating Richie Burnett 6–4 in the Dutch Darts Masters (having held off a fightback from the Welshman as Vos had led 5–1), before Michael Mansell defeated him 6–2 in the second round.

Vos qualified for his second successive World Championship by beating Dick van Dijk 6–3 in the final of the Western Europe Qualifier. He lost to Hong Kong's Royden Lam 4–1 in the preliminary round. However, he still finished the year 58th on the Order of Merit, inside the top 64 who retained their places for 2014. He reached two European Tour events during the year but was knocked out in the first round of both.

Vos dropped outside of the top 64 in the world rankings in January 2015 as he was number 87 and therefore entered Q School in an attempt to win his spot back. He reached the last 32 on the final day, but this was not enough to earn a new tour card. Vos qualified for the 2020 BDO World Championship as the 22nd ranked player, where he lost 3–0 to Martijn Kleermaker in the first round.

== World Championship results ==
=== PDC ===
- 2013: First round (lost to Adrian Lewis 1–3)
- 2014: Preliminary round (lost to Royden Lam 1–4) (legs)

=== BDO ===
- 2020: First round (lost to Martijn Kleermaker 0–3)
