= 2026 Flanders Darts Trophy =

Darts tournament

2026 Blåkläder Flanders Darts Trophy

Tournament information
- Dates: 11–13 September 2026
- Venue: Antwerp Expo
- Location: Antwerp, Belgium
- Organisation(s): Professional Darts Corporation (PDC)
- Format: Legs
- Prize fund: £230,000
- Winner's share: £35,000
- High checkout: 170; Sebastian Białecki; Chris Landman; Wessel Nijman

Champion(s)
- James Wade (ENG)

The 2026 Flanders Darts Trophy (known for sponsorship reasons as the 2026 Blåkläder Flanders Darts Trophy) was a professional darts tournament that took place at the Antwerp Expo in Antwerp, Belgium, from 11 to 13 September 2026. It was the thirteenth of fifteenth PDC European Tour events on the 2026 PDC Pro Tour. It featured a field of 48 players and £230,000 in prize money, with £35,000 going to the winner. Luke Littler was the defending champion, having defeated Josh Rock 8–7 in the 2025 final. However, Littler withdrew from the tournament, and therefore did not defend his title.

James Wade won his third European Tour title and first since 2016, defeating Ross Smith 8–4 in the final.

== Prize money ==
As part of a mass boost in prize money for Professional Darts Corporation (PDC) events in 2026, the prize fund for all 2026 European Tour events rose to £230,000, of which the winner received £35,000.

Stage (num. of players)		Prize money
Winner	(1)	£35,000
Runner-up	(1)	£15,000
Semi-finalists	(2)	£10,000
Quarter-finalists	(4)	£8,000
Third round losers	(8)	£5,000
Second round losers	(16)	£3,500*
First round losers	(16)	£2,000*
Total	£230,000	

- Pre-qualified players from the Orders of Merit who lose in their first match of the event shall not be credited with prize money on any Order of Merit.

== Qualification and format ==
The top 16 players on the two-year PDC Order of Merit were seeded and entered the tournament in the second round, while the next 16 highest-ranked players from the one-year PDC Pro Tour Order of Merit automatically qualified for the first round. The seedings were confirmed on 23 July. The remaining 16 places will go to players from four qualifying events – 10 from the Tour Card Holder Qualifier (held on 30 July), four from the Host Nation Qualifier (held on 10 September), one from the Nordic & Baltic Associate Member Qualifier (held on 7 August), and one from the East European Associate Member Qualifier (held on 8 August).

Luke Littler, Luke Humphries, Jonny Clayton and Gary Anderson withdrew and were replaced by Gabriel Clemens, James Hurrell, Kim Huybrechts and Brendan Dolan. Jermaine Wattimena, Luke Woodhouse, Martin Schindler and Krzysztof Ratajski moved up to become the 13th, 14th, 15th and 16th seeds respectively.

Seeded players

1. Gian van Veen (NED) (semi-finals)
2. James Wade (ENG) (champion)
3. Michael van Gerwen (NED) (second round)
4. Josh Rock (NIR) (second round)
5. Gerwyn Price (WAL) (third round)
6. Stephen Bunting (ENG) (third round)
7. Danny Noppert (NED) (quarter-finals)
8. Ryan Searle (ENG) (third round)
9. Chris Dobey (ENG) (quarter-finals)
10. Wessel Nijman (NED) (third round)
11. Nathan Aspinall (ENG) (quarter-finals)
12. Ross Smith (ENG) (runner-up)
13. Jermaine Wattimena (NED) (third round)
14. Luke Woodhouse (ENG) (third round)
15. Martin Schindler (GER) (second round)
16. Krzysztof Ratajski (POL) (second round)

PDC Pro Tour Order of Merit qualifiers
- Kevin Doets (NED) (third round)
- Andrew Gilding (ENG) (first round)
- Rob Cross (ENG) (third round)
- William O'Connor (IRL) (second round)
- Niko Springer (GER) (second round)
- Niels Zonneveld (NED) (second round)
- Ryan Joyce (ENG) (quarter-finals)
- Dirk van Duijvenbode (NED) (first round)
- Joe Cullen (ENG) (first round)
- Cameron Menzies (SCO) (first round)
- Damon Heta (AUS) (semi-finals)
- Sebastian Białecki (POL) (second round)

Tour Card qualifier
- Bradley Brooks (ENG) (second round)
- Cristo Reyes (ESP) (first round)
- Jim Long (CAN) (second round)
- Stephen Burton (ENG) (first round)
- Jeffrey de Graaf (SWE) (second round)
- Beau Greaves (ENG) (first round)
- Raymond van Barneveld (NED) (first round)
- Karel Sedláček (CZE) (second round)
- Mickey Mansell (IRL) (first round)
- Chris Landman (NED) (second round)
Host Nation qualifier
- Jaimy Jacobs (BEL) (first round)
- Kevin Lankhuizen (BEL) (first round)
- Jeroen Caron (BEL) (first round)
- Andy Baetens (BEL) (second round)
Nordic & Baltic qualifier
- Michael Hansen (DEN) (first round)
East European qualifier
- Petr Touš (CZE) (first round)
Reserve list
- Gabriel Clemens (GER) (second round)
- James Hurrell (ENG) (first round)
- Kim Huybrechts (BEL) (first round)
- Brendan Dolan (IRL) (second round)

== Draw ==
The draw was announced on 10 September. Numbers to the left of a player's name show the seedings for the top 16 in the tournament. The figures to the right of a player's name state their three-dart average in a match. The four reserve players are indicated by 'Alt'. Players in bold denote match winners.

**First round** (best of 11 legs); 11 September
Cameron Menzies 92.38	4
**Alt**	**Gabriel Clemens 92.66**	**6**
**Kevin Doets 99.29**	**6**
Alt	James Hurrell 75.50	1
Joe Cullen 93.98	3
**Andy Baetens 102.70**	**6**
**Niels Zonneveld 98.24**	**6**
(Czech Republic) Petr Touš 84.70	3
**Ryan Joyce 95.66**	**6**
Stephen Burton 96.11	5
**Karel Sedláček 86.07**	**6**
Michael Hansen 76.31	2
Mickey Mansell 91.79	4
**Bradley Brooks 86.16**	**6**
**Jeffrey de Graaf 89.45**	**6**
Jeroen Caron 86.38	5
Raymond van Barneveld 82.04	2
**Jim Long 85.70**	**6**
**Rob Cross 104.64**	**6**
Cristo Reyes 102.68	3
Andrew Gilding 92.50	5
**Chris Landman 89.78**	**6**
**Sebastian Białecki 91.07**	**6**
Alt	Kim Huybrechts 92.87	5
**Damon Heta 90.62**	**6**
Beau Greaves 92.96	5
**William O'Connor 93.27**	**6**
Kevin Lankhuizen 84.25	2
Dirk van Duijvenbode 87.78	3
**Alt**	**Brendan Dolan 80.56**	**6**
**Niko Springer 81.51**	**6**
(Belgium) Jaimy Jacobs 69.46	1

**Second round** (best of 11 legs); 12 September
**1**	**Gian van Veen 101.54**	**6**
Alt	Gabriel Clemens 98.81	3
16	Krzysztof Ratajski 93.49	5
**Kevin Doets 93.27**	**6**
**8**	**Ryan Searle 95.52**	**6**
Andy Baetens 88.33	2
**9**	**Chris Dobey 86.85**	**6**
Niels Zonneveld 82.11	1
4	Josh Rock 92.91	3
**Ryan Joyce 93.09**	**6**
**13**	**Jermaine Wattimena 95.56**	**6**
Karel Sedláček 91.96	3
**5**	**Gerwyn Price 103.52**	**6**
Bradley Brooks 94.01	3
**12**	**Ross Smith 100.21**	**6**
Jeffrey de Graaf 92.46	2
**2**	**James Wade 96.77**	**6**
Jim Long 96.71	2
15	Martin Schindler 84.67	4
**Rob Cross 92.98**	**6**
**7**	**Danny Noppert 97.71**	**6**
Chris Landman 89.12	2
**10**	**Wessel Nijman 92.49**	**6**
Sebastian Białecki 92.73	4
3	Michael van Gerwen 85.66	5
**Damon Heta 92.83**	**6**
**14**	**Luke Woodhouse 98.63**	**6**
William O'Connor 95.70	3
**6**	**Stephen Bunting 95.19**	**6**
Alt	Brendan Dolan 101.76	5
**11**	**Nathan Aspinall 105.99**	**6**
Niko Springer 88.78	1

**Third round** (best of 11 legs); 13 September
**1**	**van Veen 99.51**	**6**
Doets 106.24	5
8	Searle 87.97	5
**9**	**Dobey 87.58**	**6**
**Joyce 99.39**	**6**
13	Wattimena 92.38	5
5	Price 92.29	5
**12**	**Smith 92.37**	**6**
**2**	**Wade 101.59**	**6**
Cross 96.33	5
**7**	**Noppert 100.13**	**6**
10	Nijman 97.02	4
**Heta 101.38**	**6**
14	Woodhouse 102.97	3
6	Bunting 87.29	4
**11**	**Aspinall 93.37**	**6**

**Quarter-finals** (best of 11 legs); 13 September
**1**	**van Veen 96.30**	**6**
9	Dobey 102.91	3
Joyce 86.26	5
**12**	**Smith 90.42**	**6**
**2**	**Wade 99.10**	**6**
7	Noppert 94.21	0
**Heta 92.67**	**6**
11	Aspinall 99.20	5

**Semi-finals** (best of 13 legs); 13 September
1	van Veen 92.89	6
**12**	**Smith 94.31**	**7**
**2**	**Wade 97.50**	**7**
Heta 94.00	4

**Final** (best of 15 legs); 13 September
12	Smith 94.82	4
**2**	**Wade 95.50**	**8**
