= 2014 World Grand Prix (darts) =

2014 PartyPoker.com World Grand Prix

Tournament information
- Dates: 6–12 October 2014
- Venue: Citywest Hotel
- Location: Dublin, Ireland
- Organisation(s): Professional Darts Corporation (PDC)
- Format: Sets "double in, double out"
- Prize fund: £400,000
- Winner's share: £100,000
- Nine-dart finish: James Wade; Robert Thornton
- High checkout: 170 Kim Huybrechts

Champion(s)
- Michael van Gerwen (NED)

The 2014 PartyPoker.com World Grand Prix was the seventeenth staging of the World Grand Prix. It was played from 6 to 12 October 2014 at the Citywest Hotel in Dublin, Ireland. After discussion with broadcaster Sky, the semi-finals and final format were shortened to the best of 7 and best of 9 sets, instead of 9 and 11 sets respectively.

Phil Taylor was the defending champion having won his 11th Grand Prix title with a 6–0 defeat over Dave Chisnall, but he lost 3–1 to James Wade in the quarter-finals.

Michael van Gerwen won his second World Grand Prix title by defeating Wade 5–3 in the final.

Wade threw the second ever double-start nine-dart finish in his second round match against Robert Thornton. Incredibly, Thornton repeated the feat a few legs later with the two players becoming the first to both hit nine darters in the same match in the history of darts.

== Prize money ==
The total prize money was increased to £400,000 after being £350,000 for the previous five editions of this event. The following is the breakdown of the fund:

Position (num. of players)		Prize money (Total: £400,000)
Winner	(1)	£100,000
Runner-Up	(1)	£45,000
Semi-finalists	(2)	£23,500
Quarter-finalists	(4)	£15,000
Second round losers	(8)	£8,500
First round losers	(16)	£5,000
Nine-dart finish	(2)	£5,000

== Qualification ==
The field of 32 players were made up from the top 16 in the PDC Order of Merit on September 16. The remaining 16 places went to the top 14 non-qualified players from the ProTour Order of Merit and then to the top 2 non-qualified residents of the Republic of Ireland and Northern Ireland from the 2014 ProTour Order of Merit. The top eight players were seeded in the tournament.

PDC Top 16
1. (Netherlands) Michael van Gerwen (winner)
2. (England) Phil Taylor (quarter-finals)
3. (England) Adrian Lewis (second round)
4. (Scotland) Peter Wright (second round)
5. (Australia) Simon Whitlock (first round)
6. (Scotland) Gary Anderson (semi-finals)
7. (England) James Wade (runner-up)
8. (England) Dave Chisnall (first round)
9. (Scotland) Robert Thornton (second round)
10. (England) Mervyn King (quarter-finals)
11. (England) Andy Hamilton (first round)
12. (England) Wes Newton (first round)
13. (Northern Ireland) Brendan Dolan (first round)
14. (England) Justin Pipe (first round)
15. (Belgium) Kim Huybrechts (first round)
16. (England) Ian White (first round)

PDPA Players Championship qualifiers
1. (England) Michael Smith (first round)
2. (Netherlands) Vincent van der Voort (first round)
3. (England) Steve Beaton (first round)
4. (England) Jamie Caven (first round)
5. (England) Terry Jenkins (second round)
6. (England) Stephen Bunting (semi-finals)
7. (England) Dean Winstanley (second round)
8. (England) Kevin Painter (quarter-finals)
9. (England) Ronnie Baxter (first round)
10. (Netherlands) Raymond van Barneveld (second round)
11. (England) Darren Webster (first round)
12. (England) Andrew Gilding (second round)
13. (England) Andy Smith (first round)
14. (Wales) Richie Burnett (quarter-finals)

Irish qualifiers
1. (Northern Ireland) Mickey Mansell (second round)
2. (Northern Ireland) Daryl Gurney (first round)

== Draw ==
The draw was made on 21 September 2014.

First round (best of 3 sets); 6–7 October
1	(Netherlands) Michael van Gerwen 94.51	2
(Netherlands) Vincent van der Voort 84.36	0
(England) Michael Smith 82.81	1
(England) Dean Winstanley 93.00	2
8	(England) Dave Chisnall 88.86	1
(Netherlands) Raymond van Barneveld 93.69	2
(England) Wes Newton 83.00	1
(England) Mervyn King 79.71	2
5	(Australia) Simon Whitlock 85.98	1
(Wales) Richie Burnett 83.17	2
(Belgium) Kim Huybrechts 86.62	0
(England) Terry Jenkins 95.12	2
4	(Scotland) Peter Wright 95.25	2
(England) Jamie Caven 78.51	1
(England) Ronnie Baxter 76.99	0
(England) Stephen Bunting 81.87	2
2	(England) Phil Taylor 85.84	2
(England) Steve Beaton 74.67	0
(England) Darren Webster 86.71	0
(England) Andrew Gilding 85.11	2
7	(England) James Wade 94.14	2
(England) Andy Smith 85.68	0
(Scotland) Robert Thornton 88.13	2
(England) Justin Pipe 80.43	0
6	(Scotland) Gary Anderson 98.54	2
(Northern Ireland) Brendan Dolan 91.87	0
(England) Ian White 80.72	0
(Northern Ireland) Mickey Mansell 80.80	2
3	(England) Adrian Lewis 88.00	2
(Northern Ireland) Daryl Gurney 85.65	1
(England) Andy Hamilton 80.34	1
(England) Kevin Painter 79.04	2

Second round (best of 5 sets); 8–9 October
1	(Netherlands) Michael van Gerwen 98.06	3
(England) Dean Winstanley 91.82	1
(Netherlands) Raymond van Barneveld 71.54	1
(England) Mervyn King 80.18	3
(Wales) Richie Burnett 92.61	3
(England) Terry Jenkins 88.40	1
4	(Scotland) Peter Wright 95.04	2
(England) Stephen Bunting 93.30	3
2	(England) Phil Taylor 92.21	3
(England) Andrew Gilding 83.76	1
7	(England) James Wade 92.53	3
(Scotland) Robert Thornton 94.11	2
6	(Scotland) Gary Anderson 93.06	3
(Northern Ireland) Mickey Mansell 81.95	1
3	(England) Adrian Lewis 89.76	2
(England) Kevin Painter 87.56	3

Quarter-finals (best of 5 sets); 10 October
1	(Netherlands) Michael van Gerwen 89.48	3
(England) Mervyn King 86.04	2
(Wales) Richie Burnett 83.30	1
(England) Stephen Bunting 93.83	3
2	(England) Phil Taylor 93.88	1
7	(England) James Wade 90.39	3
6	(Scotland) Gary Anderson 92.55	3
(England) Kevin Painter 90.87	2

Semi-finals (best of 7 sets); 11 October
1	(Netherlands) Michael van Gerwen 93.80	4
(England) Stephen Bunting 86.20	0
7	(England) James Wade 94.03	4
6	(Scotland) Gary Anderson 93.66	3

Final (best of 9 sets); 12 October
1	(Netherlands) Michael van Gerwen 90.81	5
7	(England) James Wade 89.26	3
