= 2013 World Grand Prix (darts) =

2013 PartyPoker.com World Grand Prix

Tournament information
- Dates: 7–13 October 2013
- Venue: Citywest Hotel
- Location: Dublin, Ireland
- Organisation(s): Professional Darts Corporation (PDC)
- Format: Sets "double in, double out"
- Prize fund: £350,000
- Winner's share: £100,000
- High checkout: 164 Phil Taylor

Champion(s)
- Phil Taylor (ENG)

The 2013 PartyPoker.com World Grand Prix was the sixteenth staging of the World Grand Prix. It was played from 7 to 13 October 2013 at the Citywest Hotel in Dublin, Ireland.

Michael van Gerwen was the defending champion having won his first major PDC ranking title in 2012 with a 6–4 defeat over Mervyn King. However, he lost in the quarter-finals to Dave Chisnall. Chisnall went on to reach his first major PDC final but lost 6–0 to Phil Taylor, who claimed his 11th and final Grand Prix title.

== Prize money ==
The total prize fund was £350,000. The following is the breakdown of the fund:

Position (num. of players)		Prize money (Total: £350,000)
Winner	(1)	£100,000
Runner-Up	(1)	£40,000
Semi-finalists	(2)	£20,000
Quarter-finalists	(4)	£12,500
Second round losers	(8)	£7,000
First round losers	(16)	£4,000
Nine-dart finish	(0)	£10,000

== Qualification ==
The field of 32 players were made up from the top 16 in the PDC Order of Merit on September 23. The remaining 16 places went to the top 14 non-qualified players from the ProTour Order of Merit and then to the top 2 non-qualified residents of the Republic of Ireland and Northern Ireland from the 2013 ProTour Order of Merit.

PDC Top 16
1. (England) Phil Taylor (winner)
2. (Netherlands) Michael van Gerwen (quarter-finals)
3. (England) Adrian Lewis (second round)
4. (Australia) Simon Whitlock (quarter-finals)
5. (England) James Wade (semi-finals)
6. (England) Andy Hamilton (quarter-finals)
7. (England) Dave Chisnall (runner-up)
8. (England) Wes Newton (second round)
9. (England) Justin Pipe (semi-finals)
10. (Netherlands) Raymond van Barneveld (second round)
11. (Scotland) Robert Thornton (first round)
12. (England) Kevin Painter (second round)
13. (England) Mervyn King (first round)
14. (Northern Ireland) Brendan Dolan (first round)
15. (Belgium) Kim Huybrechts (first round)
16. (England) Terry Jenkins (first round)

PDPA Players Championship qualifiers
1. (Scotland) Peter Wright (first round)
2. (England) Jamie Caven (first round)
3. (England) Steve Beaton (first round)
4. (Canada) John Part (first round)
5. (Australia) Paul Nicholson (second round)
6. (England) Stuart Kellett (first round)
7. (England) Ian White (first round)
8. (Scotland) Gary Anderson (quarter-finals)
9. (England) Ronnie Baxter (second round)
10. (England) Colin Lloyd (first round)
11. (England) Andy Smith (first round)
12. (Netherlands) Jelle Klaasen (first round)
13. (Wales) Richie Burnett (first round)
14. (England) Wayne Jones (second round)

Irish qualifiers
1. (Republic of Ireland) Connie Finnan (second round)
2. (Northern Ireland) Mickey Mansell (first round)

== Draw ==
The draw was made on 22 September 2013.

First round (best of 3 sets); 7–8 October
1	(England) Phil Taylor 99.94	2
(England) Jamie Caven 87.77	1
(Australia) Paul Nicholson 99.24	2
(Scotland) Robert Thornton 85.52	1
8	(England) Wes Newton 85.33	2
(Scotland) Peter Wright 81.08	0
(Scotland) Gary Anderson 104.86	2
(Netherlands) Jelle Klaasen 67.22	0
5	(England) James Wade 82.59	2
(England) Steve Beaton 85.84	1
(Republic of Ireland) Connie Finnan 78.88	2
(England) Terry Jenkins 84.78	0
4	(Australia) Simon Whitlock 79.56	2
(Northern Ireland) Mickey Mansell 89.89	1
(England) Ronnie Baxter 79.46	2
(England) Colin Lloyd 82.21	0
2	(Netherlands) Michael van Gerwen 104.47	2
(Canada) John Part 87.53	0
(England) Stuart Kellett 81.02	0
(Netherlands) Raymond van Barneveld 91.81	2
7	(England) Dave Chisnall 86.53	2
(England) Ian White 86.22	1
(England) Wayne Jones 84.34	2
(England) Mervyn King 88.01	0
6	(England) Andy Hamilton 91.65	2
(Belgium) Kim Huybrechts 80.33	0
(England) Kevin Painter 83.25	2
(Wales) Richie Burnett 76.86	0
3	(England) Adrian Lewis 94.02	2
(Northern Ireland) Brendan Dolan 88.62	1
(England) Justin Pipe 80.57	2
(England) Andy Smith 72.40	0

Second round (best of 5 sets); 9–10 October
1	(England) Phil Taylor 86.88	3
(Australia) Paul Nicholson 84.70	1
8	(England) Wes Newton 87.87	2
(Scotland) Gary Anderson 89.94	3
5	(England) James Wade 84.92	3
(Republic of Ireland) Connie Finnan 83.21	2
4	(Australia) Simon Whitlock 85.95	3
(England) Ronnie Baxter 87.68	0
2	(Netherlands) Michael van Gerwen 97.72	3
(Netherlands) Raymond van Barneveld 91.71	0
7	(England) Dave Chisnall 89.11	3
(England) Wayne Jones 74.19	1
6	(England) Andy Hamilton 94.23	3
(England) Kevin Painter 80.39	1
3	(England) Adrian Lewis 83.93	0
(England) Justin Pipe 89.54	3

Quarter-finals (best of 5 sets); 11 October
1	(England) Phil Taylor 98.78	3
(Scotland) Gary Anderson 88.62	0
5	(England) James Wade 85.84	3
4	(Australia) Simon Whitlock 82.91	2
2	(Netherlands) Michael van Gerwen 88.57	2
7	(England) Dave Chisnall 96.08	3
6	(England) Andy Hamilton 75.88	1
(England) Justin Pipe 84.74	3

Semi-finals (best of 9 sets); 12 October
1	(England) Phil Taylor 96.55	5
5	(England) James Wade 79.75	1
7	(England) Dave Chisnall 83.95	5
(England) Justin Pipe 79.39	2

Final (best of 11 sets); 13 October
1	(England) Phil Taylor 97.67	6
7	(England) Dave Chisnall 81.29	0
