= Campbell Jackson =

Darts player from Northern Ireland

Personal information
- Nickname: "The Package"
- Born: 20 June 1981 (age 45) Belfast, Northern Ireland
- Home town: Derry, Northern Ireland

Sport
- Sport: Darts
- Playing since: 2001
- Darts: 23 gram Eric Bristow
- Laterality: Right-handed

Organisation (see split in darts)
- PDC: 2007–2016

WDF major events – best performances
- World Masters: Last 72: 2009

PDC premier events – best performances
- UK Open: Preliminary round: 2013

Other tournament wins
- Years
Ireland Players Championship	2010
Weigh Inn Irish Open	2014

Campbell Jackson (born 20 June 1981) is a Northern Irish former darts player who played in Professional Darts Corporation (PDC) tournaments.

== Career ==
In 2010, Jackson won an Irish Players Championship by beating Shane O'Connor 6–2 in the final. A year later he almost won the Players Championship Grand Final but lost 6–3 to Damien O'Driscoll in the final.

In January 2013, Jackson entered Qualifying School in an attempt to secure a full-time place on the PDC tour. On the third day he won six matches concluding with a 6–5 victory over Ryan de Vreede to earn a two-year tour card. He qualified for the UK Open for the first time but was beaten 5–2 by Connie Finnan in the preliminary round. He also qualified for his first European Tour event, the Austrian Darts Open and lost 6–4 to Wayne Jones in the opening round. His deepest run in a PDC to date came at the Dutch Darts Masters where Jackson saw off three time world champion John Part 6–3 and came back from 5–0 down against Mark Cox to level their last 32 game, but then lost the deciding leg.

Jackson had a very disappointing 2014 season as he played in 27 events but only reached the last 64 on four occasions and suffered a loss once there in all of them. He won the 2014 Weigh Inn Irish Open with a 5–4 victory in the final over Davy Guy and a year later was beaten 5–0 by Joshua Richardson in the Weigh Inn Bar Shootout Classic final. Jackson has not played in an event since failing to come through Q School in January 2016.

== Personal life ==
Jackson works as a stonemason. He travels to darts events with compatriot Daryl Gurney.
