= 2012 World Grand Prix (darts) =

2012 PartyPoker.com World Grand Prix

Tournament information
- Dates: 8–14 October 2012
- Venue: Citywest Hotel
- Location: Dublin, Ireland
- Organisation(s): Professional Darts Corporation (PDC)
- Format: Sets "double in, double out"
- Prize fund: £350,000
- Winner's share: £100,000
- High checkout: 170; Adrian Lewis; Brendan Dolan

Champion(s)
- Michael van Gerwen (NED)

The 2012 PartyPoker.com World Grand Prix was the fifteenth staging of the World Grand Prix. It was played from 8 to 14 October 2012 at the Citywest Hotel in Dublin, Ireland.

Phil Taylor was the defending champion, but he lost 2–3 to Robert Thornton in the second round.

The final was won by Michael van Gerwen, who won his first major title by defeating Mervyn King 6–4.

== Prize money ==
The total prize fund is £350,000. The following is the breakdown of the fund:

Position (num. of players)		Prize money (Total: £350,000)
Winner	(1)	£100,000
Runner-Up	(1)	£40,000
Semi-finalists	(2)	£20,000
Quarter-finalists	(4)	£12,500
Second round losers	(8)	£7,000
First round losers	(16)	£4,000

== Qualification ==
The field of 32 players were made up from the top 16 in the PDC Order of Merit on September 16. The remaining 16 places went to the top 14 non-qualified players from the ProTour Order of Merit and then to the top 2 non-qualified residents of the Republic of Ireland and Northern Ireland from the 2012 ProTour Order of Merit.

PDC Top 16
1. (England) Phil Taylor (second round)
2. (England) Adrian Lewis (second round)
3. (England) James Wade (first round)
4. (Scotland) Gary Anderson (first round)
5. (England) Wes Newton (semi-finals)
6. (England) Andy Hamilton (quarter-finals)
7. (Australia) Simon Whitlock (first round)
8. (England) Terry Jenkins (first round)
9. (Wales) Mark Webster (first round)
10. (Netherlands) Raymond van Barneveld (first round)
11. (England) Justin Pipe (quarter-finals)
12. (England) Kevin Painter (second round)
13. (England) Dave Chisnall (second round)
14. (England) Ronnie Baxter (first round)
15. (England) Mark Walsh (first round)
16. (Australia) Paul Nicholson (quarter-finals)

PDPA Players Championship qualifiers
1. (Netherlands) Michael van Gerwen (winner)
2. (England) Ian White (second round)
3. (Belgium) Kim Huybrechts (first round)
4. (England) Colin Lloyd (first round)
5. (Wales) Richie Burnett (first round)
6. (England) Mervyn King (runner-up)
7. (England) Andy Smith (first round)
8. (Northern Ireland) Brendan Dolan (semi-finals)
9. (Scotland) Robert Thornton (quarter-finals)
10. (Netherlands) Vincent van der Voort (second round)
11. (England) Michael Smith (first round)
12. (England) Colin Osborne (second round)
13. (England) Dean Winstanley (first round)
14. (England) Steve Beaton (second round)

Irish qualifiers
1. (Northern Ireland) Mickey Mansell (first round)
2. (Republic of Ireland) William O'Connor (first round)

== Draw ==
The draw was made on 23 September 2012. The distance in the quarter-finals were reduced from best of 7 sets to best of 5 sets to end the night earlier.

First round (best of 3 sets); 8–9 October
1	(England) Phil Taylor 100.73	2
(England) Michael Smith 91.91	0
(England) Mark Walsh 78.55	1
(Scotland) Robert Thornton 94.60	2
8	(England) Terry Jenkins 85.34	1
(England) Mervyn King 85.14	2
(England) Dean Winstanley 79.87	1
(England) Dave Chisnall 86.23	2
5	(Australia) Simon Whitlock 87.69	1
(England) Justin Pipe 81.37	2
(England) Kevin Painter 83.50	2
(Belgium) Kim Huybrechts 76.37	0
4	(Scotland) Gary Anderson 86.82	0
(Northern Ireland) Brendan Dolan 84.97	2
(Netherlands) Vincent van der Voort 76.46	2
(Republic of Ireland) William O'Connor 78.94	1
2	(England) Adrian Lewis 79.73	2
(Wales) Richie Burnett 74.82	1
(Netherlands) Michael van Gerwen 88.80	2
(England) Colin Lloyd 86.11	1
7	(England) Andy Hamilton 84.92	2
(Wales) Mark Webster 77.31	0
(England) Andy Smith 83.80	0
(England) Steve Beaton 94.49	2
6	(England) Wes Newton 89.55	2
(England) Ronnie Baxter 85.28	1
(Netherlands) Raymond van Barneveld 73.79	0
(England) Ian White 87.33	2
3	(England) James Wade 74.01	1
(England) Colin Osborne 76.91	2
(Northern Ireland) Mickey Mansell 64.48	0
(Australia) Paul Nicholson 86.91	2

Second round (best of 5 sets); 10–11 October
1	(England) Phil Taylor 95.71	2
(Scotland) Robert Thornton 96.67	3
(England) Mervyn King 93.89	3
(England) Dave Chisnall 92.53	1
(England) Justin Pipe 81.85	3
(England) Kevin Painter 84.71	2
(Northern Ireland) Brendan Dolan 89.68	3
(Netherlands) Vincent van der Voort 84.55	1
2	(England) Adrian Lewis 80.37	1
(Netherlands) Michael van Gerwen 85.60	3
7	(England) Andy Hamilton 93.25	3
(England) Steve Beaton 88.23	2
6	(England) Wes Newton 82.39	3
(England) Ian White 87.30	1
(England) Colin Osborne 82.58	1
(Australia) Paul Nicholson 83.67	3

Quarter-finals (best of 5 sets); 12 October
(Scotland) Robert Thornton 91.25	0
(England) Mervyn King 84.67	3
(England) Justin Pipe 87.07	1
(Northern Ireland) Brendan Dolan 85.53	3
(Netherlands) Michael van Gerwen 85.22	3
7	(England) Andy Hamilton 83.67	2
6	(England) Wes Newton 75.60	3
(Australia) Paul Nicholson 82.79	2

Semi-finals (best of 9 sets); 13 October
(England) Mervyn King 88.60	5
(Northern Ireland) Brendan Dolan 83.53	2
(Netherlands) Michael van Gerwen 95.04	5
6	(England) Wes Newton 82.33	1

Final (best of 11 sets); 14 October
(England) Mervyn King 81.96	4
(Netherlands) Michael van Gerwen 87.53	6

== Television coverage and sponsorship ==
The tournament was screened by Sky Sports in high definition.

PartyPoker.com sponsored the event for the second time.
