= Andree Welge =

German darts player (born 1972)

Personal information
- Nickname: The Hitman
- Born: 6 May 1972 (age 54) Bremen, Germany

Sport
- Sport: Darts
- Playing since: 1990
- Darts: 24g Mission
- Laterality: Right-handed
- Walk-on music: "Welcome to the Jungle" by Guns N' Roses

Organisation (see split in darts)
- BDO: 1992–2006
- PDC: 2006–2018

WDF major events – best performances
- World Championship: Last 32: 2002
- World Masters: Last 32: 1998

PDC premier events – best performances
- World Championship: Last 64: 2006, 2010, 2011
- European Championship: Last 16: 2012

Other tournament wins
- Years
GDC Ramada Hotel Koln	2008, 2008
German Gold Cup	1999
Germany National Championships	2008
PDC World Germany Qualifying Event	2012, 2013
Spring Cup	2008

Andree Welge (born 6 May 1972) is a German professional darts player who competes in Professional Darts Corporation (PDC) events.

== Career ==
Welge made his World Championship debut in the 2002 BDO World Darts Championship where he lost in the first round 3–2 to Eric Clarys. He made his PDC debut in the 2006 PDC World Darts Championship, where he was defeated 3–0 by Alan Warriner-Little in the first round. Four years later, he qualified for the 2010 PDC World Darts Championship, but was beaten 3–0 by Mark Dudbridge in the first round. In the 2011 PDC World Darts Championship he was close to beating Colin Lloyd in the first round, having three matchdarts, but ultimately lost 3–2.

In June 2012, he earned a place in the European Tour Event 2 in Berlin by defeating Andreas Krockel and Matheus Ziolkowski in the Home Nation Qualifier. Welge played Paul Nicholson in the first round and lost 3–6. He again came through the Home Nation Qualifier to reach the fourth European Tour Event and played Mark Webster in the first round in Stuttgart, Germany. There he beat the former world champion 6–4, despite Webster hitting a nine-dart finish in the opening leg and leading 4–2. Welge continued his run with a 6–4 win over Brendan Dolan in round two, to set up a last 16 encounter with Raymond van Barneveld, which he lost 2–6. In a copy of this, two weeks later at the European Championship he beat Webster 6–4 in the first round and once again faced Dolan in round two. However, this time he was beaten 5–10.

Welge won the Bild Superdarter, the biggest darts event ever held in Germany with thousands of players competing in best of three leg matches. He beat Tomas Seyler in the final to win the €100,000 first prize and his place in the 2013 World Championship. Welge played Leung Chen Nam of Hong Kong in the preliminary round and lost 1–4 as he hit just 10% of his doubles, with an average of 76.70.

Welge entered 2013 ranked world number 74, outside of the top 64 who retain their places on the PDC tour. Therefore, he played in the Q School in an attempt to win a tour card for 2013 and 2014 and succeeded on the third day, defeating 2008 World Championship finalist Kirk Shepherd 6–3 in his final match. He played in his second World Cup of Darts in February with Jyhan Artut and they qualified from Group F with 5–3 wins over Finland and the United States. The home nation then saw off Poland 5–2 and then played the Finnish duo of Jani Haavisto and Jarkko Komula in the quarter-finals. Artut beat Haavisto, but Welge lost to Komula 4–2 meaning that a doubles match was required to settle the tie. Germany came from 3–1 down to level at 3–3 but lost the deciding leg to exit the tournament.

Welge qualified for the 2014 World Championship by beating Maik Langendorf 10–7 in the final of the German Qualifier, but lost 4–1 to Julio Barbero in the preliminary round. Welge and Artut were beaten 5–3 by South Africa in the first round of the World Cup of Darts. Welge qualified for the German Darts Masters but lost 6–1 to Jani Haavisto in the opening round and was knocked out in the semi-finals of the World Championship Qualifier 8–4 by Sascha Stein.

In 2015, Welge attempted to qualify for four European Tour events and was successful at the German Darts Masters, but lost 6–2 to Jamie Bain in the opening round. The following year he qualified for the Dutch Darts Masters and European Darts Matchplay and was eliminated at the first round stage of both.

== World Championship results ==
=== BDO ===
- 2002: First round (lost to Erik Clarys 1–3) (sets)

=== PDC ===
- 2006: First round (lost to Alan Warriner-Little 0–3)
- 2010: First round (lost to Mark Dudbridge 0–3)
- 2011: First round (lost to Colin Lloyd 2–3)
- 2013: Preliminary round (lost to Leung Chen Nam 1–4 in legs)
- 2014: Preliminary round (lost to Julio Barbero 1–4 in legs)
