= Tonči Restović =

Croatian darts player

Personal information
- Born: 13 December 1976 (age 49) Šibenik, SR Croatia, SFR Yugoslavia
- Home town: Šibenik, Croatia

Sport
- Sport: Darts
- Playing since: 2002
- Laterality: Right-handed

Organisation (see split in darts)
- PDC: 2010–2017

Other tournament wins
- Tournament: Years
- Poljcane PDC Tournament: 2010

Tonči Restović (born 13 December 1976) is a Croatian lawyer, politician and former professional darts player. He is currently the president of Social Democratic Party's Šibenik branch since 2017.

== Career ==
At a Players Championship event in Halle in January 2011, Restović defeated Co Stompé in the first round, and eventually reached the third round before losing to Andy Smith.

He qualified for the 2012 PDC World Cup of Darts where he partnered Boris Krčmar in the Croatian team. After Croatia defeated Finland 5–4 in the first round, they faced Wales in the second round. Restović lost his singles match against Mark Webster and Croatia would lose the match 0–4. In June, Restović qualified for the European Tour Event 3 with a win over Wilfried Hoberg in the European qualifier, and then beat Denis Ovens 6–3 in the first round in Düsseldorf. He played Mark Walsh in round two and lost 1–6. Restović also qualified for the fourth European Tour Event, but was whitewashed 0–6 by Simon Whitlock in the first round.

In February 2013 he played in his second World Cup of Darts and first with Robert Marijanović and they advanced from Group G courtesy of a 5–3 victory over New Zealand. They survived two match darts from Northern Ireland in the last 16 to win 5–4 and face the Belgium brothers Ronny and Kim Huybrechts in the quarter-finals. Restović lost to Kim 4–2 and Marijanović lost to Ronny to expel Croatia from the tournament. In October, he qualified for the Dutch Darts Masters by beating Lorenzo Rasman 6–1. In the first round he faced Michael Mansell and lost 6–3.

== Outside of darts ==
Restović is a lawyer by profession. He is the 2009 Monopoly national champion and a regular competitor in Texas hold 'em poker tournaments.

On 25 November 2017, Restović was elected president of the Social Democratic Party's Šibenik branch, replacing Franko Vidović who served 11 years at that role.
