= Maik Langendorf =

Austrian darts player

Personal information
- Nickname: "The Vision"
- Born: 11 March 1972 (age 54) Hamburg, Germany
- Home town: Hamelin, Germany

Sport
- Sport: Darts
- Playing since: 1993
- Darts: 25g Bull's Signature
- Laterality: Right-handed
- Walk-on music: "One Vision" by Queen

Organisation (see split in darts)
- PDC: 2004–2019 (Tour Card 2017–2018)

PDC premier events – best performances
- UK Open: Last 128: 2013
- World Series Finals: Last 48: 2018

Maik Langendorf (born 11 March 1972) is a German-based Austrian former professional darts player, who played in Professional Darts Corporation (PDC) events.

He represented Austria in the PDC World Cup of Darts twice, alongside Mensur Suljovic in 2010 and 2013. He is a former PDC Tour Card holder, having held one from 2017 to 2018 after winning it at 2017's PDC Q–School.

== Career ==
=== 2010 ===
He represented Austria at the 2010 PDC World Cup of Darts, partnering Mensur Suljović. They were seeded 14th and defeated 19th seed Denmark 6–4 in the first round.

=== 2013 ===
In February 2013, he represented Austria at the PDC World Cup of Darts for a second time. At the 2013 event he once again partnered Mensur Suljović. They were placed in Group A alongside Japan, who defeated Austria 5–4 in a deciding leg, and number 1 seed England who beat Austria 5–2, leaving Austria bottom of the group with 0 points and therefore eliminated in the group stage.

=== 2017 ===
He won a PDC tour card on the second day of the 2017 PDC Darts Qualifying School.

=== 2018 ===
In October 2018, Langendorf qualified for the 2018 World Series of Darts Finals through the Tour Card Holder qualifier. He lost to Damon Heta 6–5 in a deciding leg in the first round.
