= 2011 UK Open Qualifier 4 =

UK Open Qualifier 4

Tournament information
- Dates: Sunday 13 March
- Venue: Robin Park Tennis Centre
- Location: Wigan
- Country: England
- Organisation(s): PDC
- Format: Best of 11 legs
- Prize fund: £34,600
- Winner's share: £6,000

Champion(s)
- (Netherlands) Vincent van der Voort

The 2011 UK Open Qualifier 4 was the fourth of eight 2011 UK Open Darts Qualifiers which was held at the Robin Park Tennis Centre in Wigan on Sunday 13 March.

== Prize money ==
Stage	Prize money (Total-£34,600)
Winner	£6,000
Runner Up	£3,000
Semi Final	£2,000
Quarter Final	£1,000
Fourth Round	£600
Third Round	£400
Second Round	£200
First Round	£0
Preliminary Round	£0

== Draw ==
Second round
(England)	Adrian Lewis	6
(Wales)	Steve Evans	1
(England)	Tony Eccles	6
(England)	Chris Aubrey	0
(England)	Chris Thompson	6
(Northern Ireland)	John MaGowan	1
(England)	Terry Jenkins	2
(Australia)	Simon Whitlock	6
(England)	Darren Johnson	6
(England)	Louis Blundell	1
(Scotland)	John Henderson	6
(England)	Dave Chisnall	4
(Sweden)	Magnus Caris	6
(England)	Mark Dudbridge	3
(England)	Mervyn King	6
(Belgium)	Rocco Maes	4
(Wales)	Barrie Bates	4
(England)	Alex Roy	6
(England)	Brian Woods	6
(England)	Jimmy Mann	1
(England)	Nick Fullwell	1
(Netherlands)	Raymond van Barneveld	6
(England)	Michael Barnard	6
(England)	Dennis Smith	2
(England)	Mark Lawrence	6
(England)	Colin Monk	3
(Scotland)	Robert Thornton	6
(England)	Nigel Heydon	5
(England)	Wes Newton	6
(Northern Ireland)	Brendan Dolan	2
(Scotland)	Gary Anderson	6
(England)	Jamie Caven	4
(England)	Kevin Painter	6
(England)	Steve Beaton	4
(England)	Andy Smith	5
(England)	Mark Frost	6
(England)	Andy Hamilton	6
(England)	Colin Lloyd	5
(England)	Mark Walsh	6
(England)	Colin Osborne	2
(Wales)	Richie Burnett	3
(Netherlands)	Vincent van der Voort	6
(Republic of Ireland)	John O'Shea	6
(England)	Michael Smith	4
(England)	Matt Clark	6
(England)	Joe Cullen	3
(England)	Shaun Griffiths	6
(England)	Lee Palfreyman	2
(England)	Ronnie Baxter	6
(England)	Peter Wright	2
(Netherlands)	Roland Scholten	1
(England)	Wayne Mardle	6
(England)	Denis Ovens	6
(Australia)	Paul Nicholson	4
(Spain)	Antonio Alcinas	6
(England)	Steve Maish	5
(Republic of Ireland)	Aodhagan O'Neill	1
(Canada)	John Part	6
(Republic of Ireland)	William O'Connor	3
(England)	Andy Pearce	6
(England)	Dennis Priestley	4
(England)	Mark Hylton	6
(Gibraltar)	Dyson Parody	3
(England)	Wayne Jones	6

Third round
(England)	Adrian Lewis	6
(England)	Tony Eccles	1
(England)	Chris Thompson	4
(Australia)	Simon Whitlock	6
(England)	Darren Johnson	6
(Scotland)	John Henderson	1
(Sweden)	Magnus Caris	4
(England)	Mervyn King	6
(England)	Alex Roy	6
(England)	Brian Woods	4
(Netherlands)	Raymond van Barneveld	6
(England)	Michael Barnard	0
(England)	Mark Lawrence	3
(Scotland)	Robert Thornton	6
(England)	Wes Newton	6
(Scotland)	Gary Anderson	3
(England)	Kevin Painter	3
(England)	Mark Frost	6
(England)	Andy Hamilton	4
(England)	Mark Walsh	6
(Netherlands)	Vincent van der Voort	6
(Republic of Ireland)	John O'Shea	3
(England)	Matt Clark	6
(England)	Shaun Griffiths	5
(England)	Ronnie Baxter	3
(England)	Wayne Mardle	6
(England)	Denis Ovens	2
(Spain)	Antonio Alcinas	6
(Canada)	John Part	6
(England)	Andy Pearce	3
(England)	Mark Hylton	6
(England)	Wayne Jones	3

Fourth round
(England)	Adrian Lewis	6
(Australia)	Simon Whitlock	4
(England)	Darren Johnson	4
(England)	Mervyn King	6
(England)	Alex Roy	4
(Netherlands)	Raymond van Barneveld	6
(Scotland)	Robert Thornton	6
(England)	Wes Newton	4
(England)	Mark Frost	1
(England)	Mark Walsh	6
(Netherlands)	Vincent van der Voort	6
(England)	Matt Clark	5
(England)	Wayne Mardle	3
(Spain)	Antonio Alcinas	6
(Canada)	John Part	6
(England)	Mark Hylton	2

Quarter-finals
(England)	Adrian Lewis	0
(England)	Mervyn King	6
(Netherlands)	Raymond van Barneveld	6
(Scotland)	Robert Thornton	4
(England)	Mark Walsh	4
(Netherlands)	Vincent van der Voort	6
(Spain)	Antonio Alcinas	5
(Canada)	John Part	6

Semi-finals
(England)	Mervyn King	2
(Netherlands)	Raymond van Barneveld	6
(Netherlands)	Vincent van der Voort	6
(Canada)	John Part	4

Final
(Netherlands)	Raymond van Barneveld	4
(Netherlands)	Vincent van der Voort	6
