= 2012 PDPA Players Championship 5 =

Second Round
1	(England) Justin Pipe	6
(England) Scott Rand	3
(Wales) Jamie Lewis	6
(England) Wayne Jones	4
16	(Netherlands) Vincent van der Voort	6
(England) Ian Jopling	5
(England) Keegan Brown	6
(England) Andy Relf	2
(Scotland) John Henderson	6
(Netherlands) Gino Vos	5
25	(England) Terry Jenkins	6
(England) Joe Murnan	3
9	(England) Andy Smith	5
(England) Peter Hudson	6
24	(England) Mark Walsh	6
(England) Mark Frost	4
5	(Netherlands) Raymond van Barneveld	6
(Scotland) Les Wallace	2
(England) John Scott	3
(England) Steve Brown	6
12	(Netherlands) Michael van Gerwen	1
(England) Steve Farmer	6
(England) Ted Hankey	6
(England) Kevin Dowling	4
4	(England) Dave Chisnall	6
(England) Arron Monk	2
29	(England) Mark Hylton	6
(England) Tony Littleton	5
(England) James Hubbard	6
(England) John Bowles	1
(England) Brian Woods	4
(England) Darren Webster	6
2	(England) Wes Newton	5
(Netherlands) Jelle Klaasen	6
31	(England) Denis Ovens	6
(Wales) Steve Evans	5
15	(Wales) Mark Webster	6
(England) Stephen Hardy	5
18	(Scotland) Peter Wright	6
(England) Darren Johnson	4
7	(Australia) Paul Nicholson	6
(England) Steve Grubb	5
26	(Belgium) Kim Huybrechts	6
(Netherlands) Roland Scholten	2
(Wales) Gareth Pass	6
(England) Tony West	3
23	(Wales) Richie Burnett	6
(England) Scott Coleman	3
6	(England) James Wade	6
(England) Jimmy Mann	4
27	(England) Andy Hamilton	6
(India) Prakash Jiwa	4
11	(England) Ronnie Baxter	6
(England) Mark Dudbridge	3
22	(England) Jamie Caven	6
(England) Stuart White	2
3	(Scotland) Gary Anderson	4
(England) Ian White	6
30	(Northern Ireland) Brendan Dolan	6
(England) Gary Butcher	4
14	(England) Steve Beaton	4
(England) Andrew Gilding	6
(Scotland) Robert Thornton	6
(England) Dave Ladley	4

Third Round
1	(England) Justin Pipe	6
(Wales) Jamie Lewis	5
16	(Netherlands) Vincent van der Voort	3
(England) Keegan Brown	6
(Scotland) John Henderson	3
25	(England) Terry Jenkins	6
(England) Peter Hudson	6
24	(England) Mark Walsh	5
5	(Netherlands) Raymond van Barneveld	6
(England) Steve Brown	2
(England) Steve Farmer	2
(England) Ted Hankey	6
4	(England) Dave Chisnall	6
29	(England) Mark Hylton	3
(England) James Hubbard	1
(England) Darren Webster	6
(Netherlands) Jelle Klaasen	6
31	(England) Denis Ovens	2
15	(Wales) Mark Webster	6
18	(Scotland) Peter Wright	3
7	(Australia) Paul Nicholson	3
26	(Belgium) Kim Huybrechts	6
(Wales) Gareth Pass	1
23	(Wales) Richie Burnett	6
6	(England) James Wade	4
27	(England) Andy Hamilton	6
11	(England) Ronnie Baxter	6
22	(England) Jamie Caven	5
(England) Ian White	6
30	(Northern Ireland) Brendan Dolan	5
(England) Andrew Gilding	5
(Scotland) Robert Thornton	6

Fourth Round
1	(England) Justin Pipe	6
(England) Keegan Brown	2
25	(England) Terry Jenkins	6
(England) Peter Hudson	1
5	(Netherlands) Raymond van Barneveld	6
(England) Ted Hankey	1
4	(England) Dave Chisnall	6
(England) Darren Webster	4
(Netherlands) Jelle Klaasen	0
15	(Wales) Mark Webster	6
26	(Belgium) Kim Huybrechts	6
23	(Wales) Richie Burnett	3
27	(England) Andy Hamilton	2
11	(England) Ronnie Baxter	6
(England) Ian White	6
(Scotland) Robert Thornton	2

Quarter-Finals
1	(England) Justin Pipe	4
25	(England) Terry Jenkins	6
5	(Netherlands) Raymond van Barneveld	3
4	(England) Dave Chisnall	6
15	(Wales) Mark Webster	6
26	(Belgium) Kim Huybrechts	2
11	(England) Ronnie Baxter	4
(England) Ian White	6

Semi-Finals
25	(England) Terry Jenkins	2
4	(England) Dave Chisnall	6
15	(Wales) Mark Webster	2
(England) Ian White	6

Final
4	(England) Dave Chisnall	6
(England) Ian White	2
