= 2011 in darts =

This article documents all the events in the sport of darts over the course of 2011.

== PDC ==
=== Ladbrokes.com World Darts Championship ===
	Score	
Quarter-Finals (best of 9 sets, 5 legs)
Phil Taylor (England)	2–5	(Wales) Mark Webster
Adrian Lewis (England)	5–2	(Netherlands) Vincent van der Voort
Wes Newton (England)	4–5	(England) Terry Jenkins
Gary Anderson (Scotland)	5–1	(Netherlands) Raymond van Barneveld
Semi-Finals (best of 11 sets, 5 legs)
Mark Webster (Wales)	4–6	(England) Adrian Lewis
Terry Jenkins (England)	2–6	(Scotland) Gary Anderson
Final (best of 13 sets, 5 legs)
Adrian Lewis (England)	7–5	(Scotland) Gary Anderson

=== Players Championship Finals (1) ===
	Score	
Quarter-Finals (best of 17 legs)
Mervyn King (England)	9–7	(England) Terry Jenkins
Wes Newton (England)	3–9	(England) Phil Taylor
Gary Anderson (Scotland)	9–5	(England) Andy Smith
Steve Farmer (England)	9–5	(England) Colin Lloyd
Semi-Finals (best of 19 legs)
Mervyn King (England)	8–10	(England) Phil Taylor
Gary Anderson (Scotland)	10–7	(England) Steve Farmer
Final (best of 25 legs)
Phil Taylor (England)	13–12	(Scotland) Gary Anderson

=== RTL7 International Masters ===
	Score	
Quarter-Finals (best of 15 legs)
Co Stompé (Netherlands)	6–8	(Netherlands) Vincent van der Voort
Raymond van Barneveld (Netherlands)	8–3	(Netherlands) Roland Scholten
Phil Taylor (England)	8–3	(England) James Wade
Gary Anderson (Scotland)	8–5	(England) Adrian Lewis
Semi-Finals (best of 15 legs)
Vincent van der Voort (Netherlands)	2–8	(Netherlands) Raymond van Barneveld
Phil Taylor (England)	8–4	(Scotland) Gary Anderson
Final (best of 15 legs)
Raymond van Barneveld (Netherlands)	3–8	(England) Phil Taylor

=== Premier League ===
	Score	
Semi finals
Phil Taylor (England)	3–8	(England) Adrian Lewis
Raymond van Barneveld (Netherlands)	6–8	(Scotland) Gary Anderson
Final
Adrian Lewis (England)	4–10	(Scotland) Gary Anderson

=== UK Open ===
	Score	
Quarter-Finals (best of 19 legs)
Denis Ovens (England)	10–6	(England) Mark Hylton
Mark Webster (Wales)	10–7	(Scotland) Robert Thornton
Wes Newton (England)	10–8	(England) Dave Chisnall
James Wade (England)	10–7	(Australia) Paul Nicholson
Semi-Finals (best of 19 legs)
James Wade (England)	10–9	(Wales) Mark Webster
Wes Newton (England)	10–6	(England) Denis Ovens
Final (best of 21 legs)
James Wade (England)	11–8	(England) Wes Newton

=== World Matchplay ===
	Score	
Quarter-Finals (best of 31 legs)
Phil Taylor (England)	16–5	(England) Wes Newton
Simon Whitlock (Australia)	15–17	(England) Andy Hamilton
Adrian Lewis (England)	16–12	(Wales) Mark Webster
Raymond van Barneveld (Netherlands)	11–16	(England) James Wade
Semi-Finals (best of 33 legs)
Phil Taylor (England)	17–9	(England) Andy Hamilton
Adrian Lewis (England)	10–17	(England) James Wade
Final (best of 35 legs)
Phil Taylor (England)	18–8	(England) James Wade

=== European Championship ===
	Score	
Quarter-Finals (best of 19 legs)
Phil Taylor (England)	10–7	(Australia) Paul Nicholson
Simon Whitlock (Australia)	10–6	(Scotland) Peter Wright
Adrian Lewis (England)	10–8	(Belgium) Kim Huybrechts
Raymond van Barneveld (Netherlands)	10–8	(England) James Wade
Semi-Finals (best of 21 legs)
Phil Taylor (England)	11–4	(Australia) Simon Whitlock
Adrian Lewis (England)	11–10	(Netherlands) Raymond van Barneveld
Final (best of 21 legs)
Phil Taylor (England)	11–8	(England) Adrian Lewis

=== World Grand Prix ===
	Score	
Quarter-Finals (best of 7 sets)
Phil Taylor (England)	4–0	(Wales) Mark Webster
Mark Hylton (England)	1–4	(Wales) Richie Burnett
Brendan Dolan (Northern Ireland)	4–1	(Scotland) John Henderson
Andy Smith (England)	2–4	(England) James Wade
Semi-Finals (best of 9 sets)
Phil Taylor (England)	5–2	(Wales) Richie Burnett
Brendan Dolan (Northern Ireland)	5–3	(England) James Wade
Final (best of 11 sets)
Phil Taylor (England)	6–3	(Northern Ireland) Brendan Dolan

=== Grand Slam of Darts ===
	Score	
Quarter-Finals (best of 31 legs)
Ted Hankey (England)	14–16	(England) Mark Walsh
Gary Anderson (Scotland)	16–12	(England) Terry Jenkins
Phil Taylor (England)	16–7	(Australia) Paul Nicholson
Mark Webster (Wales)	5–16	(England) Adrian Lewis
Semi-Finals (best of 31 legs)
Mark Walsh (England)	11–16	(Scotland) Gary Anderson
Phil Taylor (England)	16–9	(England) Adrian Lewis
Final (best of 31 legs)
Gary Anderson (Scotland)	4–16	(England) Phil Taylor

=== Players Championship Finals (2) ===
	Score	
Quarter-Finals (best of 17 legs)
Mark Webster (Wales)	9–8	(England) Dave Chisnall
Mark Walsh (England)	5–9	(England) Wes Newton
Kevin Painter (England)	9–7	(England) Mervyn King
Scott Rand (England)	9–5	(England) James Wade
Semi-Finals (best of 19 legs)
Mark Webster (Wales)	10–7	(England) Wes Newton
Kevin Painter (England)	10–9	(England) Scott Rand
Final (best of 25 legs)
Mark Webster (Wales)	9–13	(England) Kevin Painter

=== PDC Pro Tour ===
(All matches – best of 11 legs)

==== Players Championships ====
- Halle, January 29: Mervyn King 6–2 Vincent van der Voort
- Halle, January 30: Ronnie Baxter 6–4 Antonio Alcinas
- Derby, February 19: Jamie Caven 6–2 Adrian Lewis
- Derby, February 20: John Part 6–0 Mark Walsh
- Crawley, March 26: Paul Nicholson 6–4 Adrian Lewis
- Crawley, March 27: Wes Newton 6–4 Paul Nicholson
- Vienna, May 14: John Part 6–0 Denis Ovens
- Vienna, May 15: Vincent van der Voort 6–5 Phil Taylor
- Crawley, May 21: Gary Anderson 6–3 Terry Jenkins
- Crawley, May 22: Paul Nicholson 6–3 Terry Jenkins
- Barnsley, June 11: Paul Nicholson 6–4 Steve Brown
- Barnsley, June 12: Andy Smith 6–2 Dave Chisnall
- Nuland, June 18: Gary Anderson 6–5 Wes Newton
- Nuland, June 19: Gary Anderson 6–3 Andy Smith
- Ontario, August 27: John Part 6–4 Wes Newton
- Ontario, August 28: Ronnie Baxter 6–2 Kevin Painter

==== UK Open Regional Finals ====
- Qualifier 1 (Barnsley, February 26): Steve Brown 6–3 Ian White
- Qualifier 2 (Barnsley, February 27): Michael Smith 6–5 Dave Chisnall
- Qualifier 3 (Wigan, March 12): Adrian Lewis 6–4 Robert Thornton
- Qualifier 4 (Wigan, March 13): Vincent van der Voort 6–4 Raymond van Barneveld
- Qualifier 5 (Barnsley, April 16): Gary Anderson 6–4 Phil Taylor
- Qualifier 6 (Barnsley, April 17): Phil Taylor 6–1 Joe Cullen
- Qualifier 7 (Wigan, April 30): Gary Anderson 6–2 Phil Taylor
- Qualifier 8 (Wigan, May 1): Phil Taylor 6–3 Colin Osborne

== BDO/WDF ==
=== Lakeside World Darts Championship ===
	Score	
Quarter-Finals (best of 9 sets, 5 legs)
Martin Adams (England)	5–1	(England) Ross Smith
Gary Robson (England)	4–5	(Wales) Martin Phillips
Jan Dekker (Netherlands)	5–4	(England) Garry Thompson
Dean Winstanley (England)	5–1	(England) Stephen Bunting
Semi-Finals (best of 11 sets, 5 legs)
Martin Adams (England)	6–4	(Wales) Martin Phillips
Jan Dekker (Netherlands)	2–6	(England) Dean Winstanley
Final (best of 13 sets, 5 legs)
Martin Adams (England)	7–5	(England) Dean Winstanley

=== WDF Category 1 Events ===
- Dutch Open at NH Hotel/Congress centre, Veldhoven, February 6

Quarter-Finals (Losers €500, Best of 7 legs) Dean Winstanley 4–2 Geert de Vos, Tony O'Shea 4–1 Braulio Roncero, John Walton 4–1 Benito van de Pas, Martin Adams 4–1 Stefan Gerritsen
Semi-Finals (Losers €1,250, Best of 3 sets, 5 legs per set) Dean Winstanley 2–0 Tony O'Shea, Martin Adams 2–1 John Walton
Final (Winner €4,500 Runner-up €2,250, Best of 5 sets, 5 legs per set) Martin Adams 3–2 Dean Winstanley

- Scottish Open at Normandy Cosmopolitan Hotel, Renfrew, February 20

Quarter-Finals (Losers £125, Best of 5 legs) Clive Barden 3–2 Willy van de Wiel; Peter Mitchell 3–2 Steve Douglas; Gary Robson 3–1 Carl Beattie; Robbie Green 3–0 Jerry Hendriks
Semi-Finals (Losers £400, Best of 7 legs) Clive Barden 4–3 Peter Mitchell; Robbie Green 4–2 Gary Robson
Final (Winner £2,250 Runner-up £1,000, Best of 9 legs) Robbie Green 5–4 Clive Barden

- German Open in Bochum, April 16. Matches played in sets, three legs per set.

Quarter-Finals (Losers €300) Garry Thompson 2–0 John Walton; Tony O'Shea 2–0 Gary Robson; Benito van de Pas 2–0 Ted Hankey; Jan Dekker 2–0 Geert de Vos
Semi-Finals (Losers €600) Tony O'Shea 2–0 Garry Thompson; Benito van de Pas 2–0 Jan Dekker
Final (Winner €2,400 Runner-up €1,200) Benito van de Pas 3–2 Tony O'Shea

=== WDF Category 2 Events ===
- German Gold Cup, January 29 (Winner €800, Runner-up €400) Thomas Junghans (Switzerland) beat (Germany) Swen Seifert
- Isle of Man Open, March 13 (Winner £5,000, Runner-up £1,000) Ted Hankey (England) 4–1 (Netherlands) Ron Meulenkamp
- Mariflex Open, March 20 (Winner €2,500, Runner-up €1,000) Jan Dekker (Netherlands) 3–1 (England) Tony West
- Virginia Beach Dart Classic, March 27 (Winner $1,200, Runner-up $600) Tom Sawyer (United States) beat (United States) Ryan van der Weit
- Antwerp Open, April 24 (Winner €2,300, Runner-up €1,000) Tony West (England) 3–1 (Netherlands) Frans Harmsen
- Dortmund Open, May 14 (Winner €1,000, Runner-up €450) Jean Marie Rubais (Belgium) beat (Netherlands) Salmon Renyaan
- BDO International Open, June 11 (Winner £3,000, Runner-up £800) Wesley Harms (Netherlands) 4–2 (England) Stephen Bunting
- Canadian Open, June 18 (Winner C$1,000, Runner-up C$500) Dave Cameron (Canada) 5–1 (Canada) Bruce Davey
- New Zealand Masters, June 19 (Winner C$1,000, Runner-up C$500) Craig Caldwell 6–5 Koha Kokiri
- England Open, June 26 (Winner £5,000, Runner-up £2,000) Gary Robson 6–2 Ted Hankey
- England Masters, July 17 (Winner £2,000, Runner-up £800) John Walton 5–3 (Scotland) Ross Montgomery
- British Classic, July 23 (Winner £3,000, Runner-up £1,000) Dean Winstanley (England) 2–0 (England) Garry Thompson
- Pacific Masters, July 23 (Winner A$1,100, Runner-up A$600) Damon Heta (Australia) 6–4 (Australia) Andrew Townes
- Japan Open, July 24 (Winner ¥250,000, Runner-up ¥150,000) Hiroaki Shimizu beat Katsuya Aiba
- Belgium Open, August 7 (Winner €2,300, Runner-up €1,000) Ross Montgomery (Scotland) 3–0 (Netherlands) Ron Meulenkamp
- New Zealand Open, August 10 (Winner NZ$1,500, Runner-up NZ$700) Greg Moss 4–2 Jonathan Silcock
