= 2011 UK Open Qualifier 7 =

UK Open Qualifier 7

Tournament information
- Dates: Saturday 30 April
- Venue: Robin Park Tennis Centre
- Location: Wigan
- Country: England
- Organisation(s): PDC
- Format: Best of 11 legs
- Prize fund: £34,600
- Winner's share: £6,000

Champion(s)
- (Scotland) Gary Anderson

The 2011 UK Open Qualifier 7 was the seventh of eight 2011 UK Open Darts Qualifiers which was held at the Robin Park Tennis Centre in Wigan on Saturday 30 April.

== Prize money ==
Stage	Prize money (Total-£34,600)
Winner	£6,000
Runner Up	£3,000
Semi Final	£2,000
Quarter Final	£1,000
Fourth Round	£600
Third Round	£400
Second Round	£200
First Round	£0
Preliminary Round	£0

== Draw ==
Second round
(Wales)	Mark Webster	6
(England)	Mark Walsh	4
(England)	Kevin McDine	3
(England)	Shaun Griffiths	6
(Netherlands)	Vincent van der Voort	6
(Wales)	Barrie Bates	5
(England)	Darren Johnson	6
(Northern Ireland)	John MaGowan	4
(Netherlands)	Michael van Gerwen	6
(England)	Peter Wright	4
(England)	Wayne Jones	6
(England)	Dennis Priestley	3
(England)	Colin Osborne	2
(England)	Alan Tabern	6
(England)	Andy Jenkins	6
(England)	Louis Blundell	0
(England)	Andy Hamilton	6
(England)	James Richardson	4
(England)	Nick Fullwell	6
(England)	Richie Corner	5
(England)	Michael Smith	2
(England)	Denis Ovens	6
(Germany)	Jyhan Artut	2
(England)	Steve Beaton	6
(England)	Justin Pipe	2
(England)	Phil Taylor	6
(Sweden)	Magnus Caris	6
(England)	Colin Monk	2
(England)	Mark Frost	6
(Netherlands)	Jelle Klaasen	5
(England)	Matt Padgett	6
(England)	Scott Rand	4
(Australia)	Simon Whitlock	3
(Canada)	John Part	6
(England)	Mark Dudbridge	3
(England)	Nigel Heydon	6
(Australia)	Paul Nicholson	6
(England)	Kevin Painter	2
(England)	Adrian Lewis	6
(England)	Steve Brown	4
(England)	Ronnie Baxter	6
(Northern Ireland)	Brendan Dolan	5
(England)	Mark Hylton	3
(Scotland)	Gary Anderson	6
(England)	Dennis Smith	6
(England)	Matthew Edgar	1
(England)	Arron Monk	6
(England)	Tony Ayres	3
(England)	Nicky Bache	6
(England)	Terry Temple	5
(England)	Tony Eccles	3
(England)	Mervyn King	6
(England)	Peter Hudson	3
(England)	Wes Newton	6
(Wales)	Richie Burnett	5
(England)	Terry Jenkins	6
(England)	Chris Aubrey	6
(England)	Jason Crawley	5
(Scotland)	Robert Thornton	6
(England)	Andy Smith	4
(England)	Gary Welding	6
(England)	James Wade	4
(Germany)	Michael Rosenauer	5
(England)	Martyn Turner	6

Third round
(Wales)	Mark Webster	6
(England)	Shaun Griffiths	4
(Netherlands)	Vincent van der Voort	6
(England)	Darren Johnson	5
(Netherlands)	Michael van Gerwen	5
(England)	Wayne Jones	6
(England)	Alan Tabern	6
(England)	Andy Jenkins	4
(England)	Andy Hamilton	6
(England)	Nick Fullwell	1
(England)	Denis Ovens	6
(England)	Steve Beaton	2
(England)	Phil Taylor	6
(Sweden)	Magnus Caris	1
(England)	Mark Frost	0
(England)	Matt Padgett	6
(Canada)	John Part	5
(England)	Nigel Heydon	6
(Australia)	Paul Nicholson	3
(England)	Adrian Lewis	6
(England)	Ronnie Baxter	5
(Scotland)	Gary Anderson	6
(England)	Dennis Smith	5
(England)	Arron Monk	6
(England)	Nicky Bache	4
(England)	Mervyn King	6
(England)	Wes Newton	6
(England)	Terry Jenkins	2
(England)	Chris Aubrey	2
(Scotland)	Robert Thornton	6
(England)	Gary Welding	6
(England)	Martyn Turner	3

Fourth round
(Wales)	Mark Webster	5
(Netherlands)	Vincent van der Voort	6
(England)	Wayne Jones	6
(England)	Alan Tabern	1
(England)	Andy Hamilton	6
(England)	Denis Ovens	4
(England)	Phil Taylor	6
(England)	Matt Padgett	3
(England)	Nigel Heydon	5
(England)	Adrian Lewis	6
(Scotland)	Gary Anderson	6
(England)	Arron Monk	1
(England)	Mervyn King	6
(England)	Wes Newton	3
(Scotland)	Robert Thornton	4
(England)	Gary Welding	6

Quarter-finals
(Netherlands)	Vincent van der Voort	3
(England)	Wayne Jones	6
(England)	Andy Hamilton	3
(England)	Phil Taylor	6
(England)	Adrian Lewis	5
(Scotland)	Gary Anderson	6
(England)	Mervyn King	6
(England)	Gary Welding	2

Semi-finals
(England)	Wayne Jones	3
(England)	Phil Taylor	6
(Scotland)	Gary Anderson	6
(England)	Mervyn King	3

Final
(England)	Phil Taylor	2
(Scotland)	Gary Anderson	6
