= 2011 UK Open Qualifier 8 =

UK Open Qualifier 8

Tournament information
- Dates: Sunday 1 May
- Venue: Robin Park Tennis Centre
- Location: Wigan
- Country: England
- Organisation(s): PDC
- Format: Best of 11 legs
- Prize fund: £34,600
- Winner's share: £6,000

Champion(s)
- (England) Phil Taylor

The 2011 UK Open Qualifier 8 was the last of eight 2011 UK Open Darts Qualifiers which was held at the Robin Park Tennis Centre in Wigan on Sunday 1 May.

== Prize money ==
Stage	Prize money (Total – £34,600)
Winner	£6,000
Runner Up	£3,000
Semi Final	£2,000
Quarter Final	£1,000
Fourth Round	£600
Third Round	£400
Second Round	£200
First Round	£0
Preliminary Round	£0

== Draw ==
Second round
(England)	Chris Thompson	5
(England)	Joe Cullen	6
(Germany)	Jyhan Artut	6
(England)	Dave Smith	5
(England)	Nigel Heydon	6
(England)	Brian Woods	5
(England)	Colin Lloyd	2
(England)	Phil Taylor	6
(England)	Justin Pipe	6
(Austria)	Mensur Suljović	3
(Belgium)	Rocco Maes	1
(Scotland)	Robert Thornton	6
(England)	Mark Jones	2
(Wales)	Richie Burnett	6
(Canada)	John Part	6
(England)	Alex Roy	1
(Scotland)	Gary Anderson	6
(Australia)	Paul Nicholson	1
(England)	Mark Lawrence	5
(England)	Ronnie Baxter	6
(England)	Chris Aubrey	4
(England)	Steve Hine	6
(England)	Dennis Priestley	5
(England)	Steve Brown	6
(Northern Ireland)	John MaGowan	6
(Northern Ireland)	Michael Mansell	5
(England)	Mervyn King	3
(England)	Mark Frost	6
(Netherlands)	Mareno Michels	5
(England)	Tony Eccles	6
(England)	Alan Tabern	6
(England)	Andy Jenkins	5
(England)	Kevin McDine	6
(England)	Nick Bache	5
(England)	Wayne Jones	6
(England)	Ian White	4
(England)	Jamie Caven	6
(Netherlands)	Roland Scholten	4
(England)	Darren Johnson	6
(England)	Adrian Lewis	5
(England)	Peter Wright	6
(England)	Mick Todd	4
(England)	Colin Osborne	6
(England)	Reece Robinson	4
(England)	Terry Jenkins	6
(England)	Steve Maish	5
(England)	Kevin Painter	4
(Netherlands)	Jelle Klaasen	6
(England)	Peter Hudson	6
(England)	Tony Ayres	3
(England)	James Wade	6
(England)	Dave Chisnall	5
(England)	Andy Smith	6
(England)	Kirk Shepherd	4
(England)	Mark Walsh	2
(Australia)	Simon Whitlock	6
(England)	Mark Dudbridge	2
(England)	Wes Newton	6
(Wales)	Mark Webster	6
(England)	Matthew Edgar	5
(England)	Andy Hamilton	4
(England)	Denis Ovens	6
(England)	Michael Barnard	6
(England)	Shaun Griffiths	5

Third round
(England)	Joe Cullen	6
(Germany)	Jyhan Artut	4
(England)	Nigel Heydon	2
(England)	Phil Taylor	6
(England)	Justin Pipe	3
(Scotland)	Robert Thornton	6
(Wales)	Richie Burnett	1
(Canada)	John Part	6
(Scotland)	Gary Anderson	6
(England)	Ronnie Baxter	3
(England)	Steve Hine	1
(England)	Steve Brown	6
(Northern Ireland)	John MaGowan	6
(England)	Mark Frost	2
(England)	Tony Eccles	3
(England)	Alan Tabern	6
(England)	Kevin McDine	6
(England)	Wayne Jones	4
(England)	Jamie Caven	6
(England)	Darren Johnson	4
(England)	Peter Wright	5
(England)	Colin Osborne	6
(England)	Terry Jenkins	6
(Netherlands)	Jelle Klaasen	4
(England)	Peter Hudson	6
(England)	James Wade	5
(England)	Andy Smith	0
(Australia)	Simon Whitlock	6
(England)	Wes Newton	1
(Wales)	Mark Webster	6
(England)	Denis Ovens	6
(England)	Michael Barnard	0

Fourth round
(England)	Joe Cullen	1
(England)	Phil Taylor	6
(Scotland)	Robert Thornton	6
(Canada)	John Part	5
(Scotland)	Gary Anderson	6
(England)	Steve Brown	4
(Northern Ireland)	John MaGowan	4
(England)	Alan Tabern	6
(England)	Kevin McDine	6
(England)	Jamie Caven	5
(England)	Colin Osborne	6
(England)	Terry Jenkins	1
(England)	Peter Hudson	3
(Australia)	Simon Whitlock	6
(England)	Wes Newton	6
(England)	Denis Ovens	4

Quarter-finals
(England)	Phil Taylor	6
(Scotland)	Robert Thornton	3
(Scotland)	Gary Anderson	6
(England)	Alan Tabern	5
(England)	Kevin McDine	5
(England)	Colin Osborne	6
(Australia)	Simon Whitlock	1
(England)	Wes Newton	6

Semi-finals
(England)	Phil Taylor	6
(Scotland)	Gary Anderson	2
(England)	Colin Osborne	6
(England)	Wes Newton	4

Final
(England)	Phil Taylor	6
(England)	Colin Osborne	3
