= 2012 PDPA Players Championship 4 =

Second Round
1	(Scotland) Gary Anderson	6
(England) James Hubbard	2
32	(Wales) Richie Burnett	4
(England) Richie Howson	6
16	(England) Kevin Painter	3
(England) Andy Hamilton	6
17	(Netherlands) Michael van Gerwen	6
(Germany) Bernd Roith	3
8	(England) Dave Chisnall	6
(Netherlands) Co Stompé	4
(England) Dennis Smith	6
(England) Andy Jenkins	3
9	(Australia) Simon Whitlock	6
(Netherlands) Jelle Klaasen	1
24	(England) Mark Hylton	6
(England) Tony Littleton	2
5	(Australia) Paul Nicholson	6
(England) Ross Smith	4
28	(England) Denis Ovens	3
(England) John Bowles	6
12	(England) Mervyn King	3
(England) Brian Woods	6
21	(England) Jamie Caven	6
(England) Andrew Gilding	3
4	(England) Wes Newton	6
(England) Steve West	3
(England) James Richardson	6
(England) Joe Murnan	3
13	(England) Colin Osborne	6
(Republic of Ireland) William O'Connor	4
20	(England) Steve Beaton	6
(England) Chris Thompson	1
(Belgium) Kim Huybrechts	6
(England) Steve Farmer	0
31	(England) Michael Smith	6
(England) Reece Robinson	2
(Scotland) Robert Thornton	5
(Republic of Ireland) Connie Finnan	6
18	(Wales) Mark Webster	6
(Netherlands) Gino Vos	2
(England) Ted Hankey	6
(England) Nigel Heydon	1
26	(England) Scott Rand	5
(England) Liam Kelly	6
10	(England) Ronnie Baxter	6
(Scotland) Jim Walker	0
23	(Netherlands) Raymond van Barneveld	6
(England) Paul Rowley	3
6	(Canada) John Part	6
(Scotland) Keith Stephen	4
27	(England) Steve Brown	6
(England) Darren Johnson	3
11	(England) James Wade	6
(Northern Ireland) Michael Mansell	5
(England) Tony West	6
(England) Johnny Haines	3
3	(England) Phil Taylor	6
(Germany) Jyhan Artut	3
(England) Ian Jopling	3
(Wales) Steve Evans	6
14	(Scotland) Peter Wright	6
(Republic of Ireland) Paddy Meaney	1
(Northern Ireland) Brendan Dolan	6
(England) Stephen Hardy	1

Third Round
1	(Scotland) Gary Anderson	6
(England) Richie Howson	0
(England) Andy Hamilton	6
17	(Netherlands) Michael van Gerwen	5
8	(England) Dave Chisnall	6
(England) Dennis Smith	5
9	(Australia) Simon Whitlock	6
24	(England) Mark Hylton	2
5	(Australia) Paul Nicholson	6
(England) John Bowles	4
(England) Brian Woods	3
21	(England) Jamie Caven	6
4	(England) Wes Newton	6
(England) James Richardson	3
13	(England) Colin Osborne	4
20	(England) Steve Beaton	6
(Belgium) Kim Huybrechts	6
31	(England) Michael Smith	5
(Republic of Ireland) Connie Finnan	4
18	(Wales) Mark Webster	6
(England) Ted Hankey	0
(England) Liam Kelly	6
10	(England) Ronnie Baxter	2
23	(Netherlands) Raymond van Barneveld	6
6	(Canada) John Part	6
27	(England) Steve Brown	5
11	(England) James Wade	6
(England) Tony West	4
3	(England) Phil Taylor	6
(Wales) Steve Evans	2
14	(Scotland) Peter Wright	3
(Northern Ireland) Brendan Dolan	6

Fourth Round
1	(Scotland) Gary Anderson	5
(England) Andy Hamilton	6
8	(England) Dave Chisnall	6
9	(Australia) Simon Whitlock	1
5	(Australia) Paul Nicholson	4
21	(England) Jamie Caven	6
4	(England) Wes Newton	3
20	(England) Steve Beaton	6
(Belgium) Kim Huybrechts	6
18	(Wales) Mark Webster	4
(England) Liam Kelly	3
23	(Netherlands) Raymond van Barneveld	6
6	(Canada) John Part	5
11	(England) James Wade	6
3	(England) Phil Taylor	6
(Northern Ireland) Brendan Dolan	0

Quarter-Finals
(England) Andy Hamilton	0
8	(England) Dave Chisnall	6
21	(England) Jamie Caven	5
20	(England) Steve Beaton	6
(Belgium) Kim Huybrechts	6
23	(Netherlands) Raymond van Barneveld	5
11	(England) James Wade	4
3	(England) Phil Taylor	6

Semi-Finals
8	(England) Dave Chisnall	6
20	(England) Steve Beaton	5
(Belgium) Kim Huybrechts	4
3	(England) Phil Taylor	6

Final
8	(England) Dave Chisnall	6
3	(England) Phil Taylor	5
