= 2011 Championship League Darts =

Championship League Darts

Tournament information
- Dates: 27 September – 20 October
- Venue: Crondon Park Golf Club
- Location: Stock, Essex
- Country: England
- Organisation(s): Professional Darts Corporation (PDC)
- Format: Legs
- Prize fund: £189,000
- Winner's share: £10,000
- Nine-dart finish: Simon Whitlock; Phil Taylor

Champion(s)
- (England) Phil Taylor

The 2011 Championship League Darts was the fourth edition of a darts competition — the Championship League Darts. The competition was organized and held by the Professional Darts Corporation, with the 2011 edition having a maximum prize fund of £189,000.

The format of the tournament was similar to the Premier League Darts tournament, also organized by the PDC, except it was contested by a larger pool of players who were split up into a number of groups.

Every match could be watched on one of the thirty bookmaker websites who broadcast the competition. The tournament was available globally through the internet, except in the United States of America where it could not be shown for legal reasons.

== Format ==
The first group consisted of the top eight players from the PDC Order of Merit who were available for the competition. These eight players played each other over the course of a day, receiving two points for each win. All matches were contested over a maximum of 11 legs with a player winning the match on reaching 6 legs. After all players had played each other, the four players with the most points progressed to the semi-finals with the winners of those matches progressing into the final.

The winner of the final progressed to the winners group which took place at the end of the competition. The runner-up, losing semi-finalists and the players finishing fifth and sixth moved into group two, where they were joined by the next three players in the Order of Merit. The format of the second group was the same as the first group with players moving into the third group. In total there were 8 groups before the final group took place.

This format ensures that all players who do not win the group or finish in the last two positions have another chance to qualify for the winners group.

== Tournament dates ==
The tournament took place over 9 days throughout September and October 2010. One group was played on each day. The dates were as follows:

- Group 1 – Tuesday 27 September
- Group 2 – Wednesday 28 September
- Group 3 – Thursday 29 September
- Group 4 – Tuesday 11 October
- Group 5 – Wednesday 12 October
- Group 6 – Thursday 13 October
- Group 7 – Tuesday 18 October
- Group 8 – Wednesday 19 October
- Winners Group – Thursday 20 October

The tournament took place at the Crondon Park Golf Club in Essex.

**Group 1**

- (England) Phil Taylor
- (England) Adrian Lewis
- (England) James Wade
- (Scotland) **Gary Anderson**
- (Australia) Simon Whitlock
- (England) Wes Newton
- (Wales) Mark Webster
- (England) Terry Jenkins

**Group 2**

- (England) **Phil Taylor**
- (England) James Wade
- (Australia) Simon Whitlock
- (England) Wes Newton
- (Wales) Mark Webster
- (Australia) Paul Nicholson
- (England) Andy Hamilton
- (England) Mervyn King

**Group 3**

- (Australia) Simon Whitlock
- (England) Wes Newton
- (Australia) **Paul Nicholson**
- (England) Andy Hamilton
- (England) Mervyn King
- (England) Wayne Jones
- (England) Mark Walsh
- (England) Colin Lloyd

**Group 4**

- (Australia) Simon Whitlock
- (England) Mervyn King
- (England) Wayne Jones
- (England) **Mark Walsh**
- (England) Colin Lloyd
- (England) Ronnie Baxter
- (Netherlands) Vincent van der Voort
- (England) Jamie Caven

**Group 5**

- (Australia) Simon Whitlock
- (England) **Mervyn King**
- (England) Colin Lloyd
- (Netherlands) Vincent van der Voort
- (England) Jamie Caven
- (England) Andy Smith
- (England) Colin Osborne
- (England) Kevin Painter

**Group 6**

- (Australia) **Simon Whitlock**
- (Netherlands) Vincent van der Voort
- (England) Andy Smith
- (England) Colin Osborne
- (England) Kevin Painter
- (England) Denis Ovens
- (England) Alan Tabern
- (England) Steve Beaton

**Group 7**

- (Netherlands) Vincent van der Voort
- (England) Andy Smith
- (England) **Steve Beaton**
- (England) Alan Tabern
- (England) Kevin Painter
- (Netherlands) ~~Co Stompé~~
- (Scotland) Robert Thornton
- (England) Mark Dudbridge
- (Canada) John Part

**Group 8**

- (Netherlands) Vincent van der Voort
- (England) Alan Tabern
- (England) Kevin Painter
- (England) Mark Dudbridge
- (Canada) John Part
- (England) Steve Brown
- (England) **Dennis Priestley**
- (Netherlands) Jelle Klaasen

Co Stompe withdrew following group 6 due to injury. As a consequence John Part was moved from starting in group 8 to group 7 and Jelle Klaasen was added as a replacement in group 8.

Group winners in bold, players eliminated in italic

**Winners Group**

  - (Scotland) Gary Anderson
  - (England) Phil Taylor
  - (Australia) Paul Nicholson
  - (England) Mark Walsh
  - (England) Mervyn King
  - (Australia) Simon Whitlock
  - (England) Steve Beaton
  - (England) Dennis Priestley

== Group stage ==
=== Group 1 ===
Played Tuesday 27 September, group 1 was won by Gary Anderson. Terry Jenkins and reigning world champion Adrian Lewis were knocked out.

		Tay	And	Whi	New	Web	Wad	Lew	Jen	Points, Legs
1	(England) Phil Taylor		6–2	6–3	6–3	6–1	6–2	6–3	6–2	14, 42–16
2	(Scotland) Gary Anderson	2–6		6–5	6–5	6–5	6–2	6–2	6–5	12, 38–30
3	(Australia) Simon Whitlock	3–6	5–6		6–5	6–1	6–1	6–3	6–1	10, 38–23
4	(England) Wes Newton	3–6	5–6	5–6		6–4	6–4	6–2	6–1	8, 37–33
5	(Wales) Mark Webster	1–6	5–6	1–6	4–6		6–3	6–5	6–1	6, 29–33
6	(England) James Wade	2–6	2–6	1–6	4–6	3–6		6–4	6–5	4, 24–39
7	(England) Adrian Lewis	3–6	2–6	3–6	2–6	5–6	4–6		6–0	2, 25–36
8	(England) Terry Jenkins	2–6	5–6	1–6	1–6	1–6	5–6	0–6		0, 19–42

Semi-final
1	(England) Phil Taylor	5
4	(England) Wes Newton	6
2	(Scotland) Gary Anderson	6
3	(Australia) Simon Whitlock	4

Final
4	(England) Wes Newton	1
2	(Scotland) Gary Anderson	6

=== Group 2 ===
Played on 28 September 2011 group 2 was won by world number one Phil Taylor. James Wade and Mark Webster were eliminated.

		Tay	Kin	Whi	Nic	New	Ham	Wad	Web	Points, Legs
1	(England) Phil Taylor		6–4	4–6	6–0	6–4	6–1	6–1	6–3	12, 40–19
2	(England) Mervyn King	4–6		6–4	4–6	6–2	6–2	6–2	6–4	10, 38–26
3	(Australia) Simon Whitlock	6–4	4–6		5–6	6–5	6–4	6–4	6–4	10, 39–33
4	(Australia) Paul Nicholson	0–6	6–4	6–5		5–6	6–2	6–3	6–3	10, 35–29
5	(England) Wes Newton	4–6	2–6	5–6	6–5		6–2	5–6	6–0	6, 34–31
6	(England) Andy Hamilton	1–6	2–6	4–6	2–6	2–6		6–2	6–4	4, 23–34
7	(England) James Wade	1–6	2–6	4–6	3–6	6–5	2–6		5–6	2, 23–41
8	(Wales) Mark Webster	3–6	4–6	4–6	3–6	0–6	4–6	6–5		2, 22–41

Semi-final
1	(England) Phil Taylor	6
4	(Australia) Paul Nicholson	3
2	(England) Mervyn King	5
3	(Australia) Simon Whitlock	6

Final
1	(England) Phil Taylor	6
4	(Australia) Simon Whitlock	5

=== Group 3 ===
Group 3 was played on 29 September 2011 and won by Paul Nicholson. Andy Hamilton and Wes Newton were eliminated.

		Nic	Llo	Whi	Wal	Jon	Kin	New	Ham	Points, Legs
1	(Australia) Paul Nicholson		6–4	6–5	6–3	6–5	3–6	6–4	6–4	12, 39–31
2	(England) Colin Lloyd	4–6		2–6	6–5	6–4	6–1	6–5	6–3	10, 36–30
3	(Australia) Simon Whitlock	5–6	6–2		3–6	3–6	6–3	6–1	6–2	8, 35–26
4	(England) Mark Walsh	3–6	5–6	6–3		6–4	2–6	6–1	6–4	8, 34–30
5	(England) Wayne Jones	5–6	4–6	6–3	4–6		6–3	5–6	6–1	6, 36–31
6	(England) Mervyn King	6–3	1–6	3–6	6–2	3–6		2–6	6–3	6, 27–32
7	(England) Wes Newton	4–6	5–6	1–6	1–6	6–5	6–2		6–5	6, 29–36
8	(England) Andy Hamilton	4–6	3–6	2–6	4–6	1–6	3–6	5–6		0, 22–42

Semi-final
1	(Australia) Paul Nicholson	6
4	(England) Mark Walsh	4
2	(England) Colin Lloyd	4
3	(Australia) Simon Whitlock	6

Final
1	(Australia) Paul Nicholson	6
4	(Australia) Simon Whitlock	4

=== Group 4 ===
Group 4 was played on 11 October 2011 and won by Mark Walsh. Ronnie Baxter and Wayne Jones were eliminated.

		Whi	Llo	Kin	Wal	Cav	Voo	Bax	Jon	Points, Legs
1	(Australia) Simon Whitlock		5–6	6–4	6–2	6–3	2–6	6–1	6–5	10, 37–27
2	(England) Colin Lloyd	6–5		2–6	6–5	6–3	6–2	3–6	6–4	10, 25–31
3	(England) Mervyn King	4–6	6–2		0–6	1–6	6–3	6–2	6–1	8, 29–26
4	(England) Mark Walsh	2–6	5–6	6–0		6–2	4–6	4–6	6–1	6, 33–27
5	(England) Jamie Caven	3–6	3–6	6–1	2–6		3–6	6–4	6–3	6, 29–32
6	(Netherlands) Vincent v d Voort	6–2	2–6	3–6	6–4	6–3		4–6	2–6	6, 29–33
7	(England) Ronnie Baxter	1–6	6–3	2–6	6–4	4–6	6–4		5–6	6, 30–35
8	(England) Wayne Jones	5–6	4–6	1–6	1–6	3–6	6–2	6–5		4, 26–37

Semi-final
1	(Australia) Simon Whitlock	2
4	(England) Mark Walsh	6
2	(England) Colin Lloyd	2
3	(England) Mervyn King	6

Final
4	(England) Mark Walsh	6
3	(England) Mervyn King	2

=== Group 5 ===
Group 5 was played on 12 October 2011 and won by Mervyn King. Colin Lloyd and Jamie Caven were eliminated. In the group phase Simon Whitlock achieved a nine dart finish checking out 144 with double 18.

		Kin	Smi	Whi	Pain	Osb	Voo	Llo	Cav	Points, Legs
1	(England) Mervyn King		6–4	6–5	5–6	6–0	6–3	6–1	6–3	12, 41–22
2	(England) Andy Smith	4–6		6–4	6–4	5–6	6–4	6–2	6–0	10, 39–26
3	(Australia) Simon Whitlock	5–6	4–6		2–6	6–2	6–4	6–4	6–3	8, 35–31
4	(England) Kevin Painter	6–5	4–6	6–2		6–4	4–6	5–6	6–5	8, 37–34
5	(England) Colin Osborne	0–6	6–5	2–6	4–6		6–2	6–5	6–2	8, 30–32
6	(Netherlands) Vincent v d Voort	3–6	4–6	4–6	6–4	2–6		6–3	6–5	6, 31–36
7	(England) Colin Lloyd	1–6	2–6	4–6	6–5	5–6	3–6		6–3	4, 27–38
8	(England) Jamie Caven	3–6	0–6	3–6	5–6	2–6	5–6	3–6		0, 21–42

Semi-final
1	(England) Mervyn King	6
4	(England) Kevin Painter	2
2	(England) Andy Smith	3
3	(Australia) Simon Whitlock	6

Final
1	(England) Mervyn King	6
3	(Australia) Simon Whitlock	3

=== Group 6 ===
Group 6 was played on 13 October 2011 and won by Simon Whitlock, who finally won after reaching all five preceding play-offs. Denis Ovens and Colin Osborne were eliminated.

		Bea	Whi	Smi	Voo	Tab	Pai	Ove	Osb	Points, Legs
1	(England) Steve Beaton		3–6	6–5	6–4	6–2	6–4	6–1	6–1	12, 39–23
2	(Australia) Simon Whitlock	6–3		3–6	6–5	6–5	6–3	6–2	6–4	12, 39–28
3	(England) Andy Smith	5–6	6–3		6–5	6–3	4–6	6–1	6–5	10, 39–29
4	(Netherlands) Vincent v d Voort	5–6	5–6	5–6		6–5	3–6	6–2	6–3	6, 35–34
5	(England) Alan Tabern	2–6	5–6	3–6	5–6		6–2	6–4	6–5	6, 33–35
6	(England) Kevin Painter	4–6	3–6	6–4	6–3	2–6		0–6	6–5	6, 27–36
7	(England) Denis Ovens	1–6	2–6	1–6	2–6	4–6	6–0		6–4	4, 22–34
8	(England) Colin Osborne	1–6	4–6	5–6	3–6	5–6	5–6	4–6		0, 27–42

Semi-final
1	(England) Steve Beaton	5
4	(Netherlands) Vincent v d Voort	6
2	(Australia) Simon Whitlock	6
3	(England) Andy Smith	4

Final
4	(Netherlands) Vincent v d Voort	5
2	(Australia) Simon Whitlock	6

=== Group 7 ===
Group 7 was played on 18 October 2011 and won by Steve Beaton. Andy Smith and Robert Thornton were eliminated.

		Voo	Bea	Par	Pai	Tab	Dud	Smi	Tho	Points, Legs
1	(Netherlands) Vincent v d Voort		6–2	2–6	6–2	6–1	6–3	6–5	5–6	10, 37–25
2	(England) Steve Beaton	2–6		6–5	6–3	4–6	6–4	6–3	6–3	10, 36–25
3	(Canada) John Part	6–2	5–6		6–4	4–6	4–6	6–5	6–1	8, 37–30
4	(England) Kevin Painter	2–6	3–6	4–6		6–3	6–3	6–3	6–2	8, 33–29
5	(England) Alan Tabern	1–6	6–4	6–4	3–6		5–6	5–6	6–2	6, 32–34
6	(England) Mark Dudbridge	3–6	4–6	6–4	3–6	6–5		5–6	6–5	6, 33–38
7	(England) Andy Smith	5–6	3–6	5–6	3–6	6–5	6–5		5–6	4, 33–40
8	(Scotland) Robert Thornton	6–5	3–6	1–6	2–6	2–6	5–6	6–5		4, 25–40

Semi-final
1	(Netherlands) Vincent v d Voort	4
4	(England) Kevin Painter	6
2	(England) Steve Beaton	6
3	(Canada) John Part	5

Final
4	(England) Kevin Painter	4
2	(England) Steve Beaton	6

=== Group 8 ===
Group 8 was played on 19 October 2011 and won by Dennis Priestley. As this was the last group all other seven participants missed out on qualifying to the winners group.

		Par	Pai	Voo	Pri	Dud	Tab	Kla	Bro	Points, Legs
1	(Canada) John Part		6–4	6–1	6–5	6–1	5–6	6–1	6–4	12, 41–22
2	(England) Kevin Painter	4–6		6–5	6–2	6–5	6–5	6–1	6–4	12, 40–28
3	(Netherlands) Vincent v d Voort	1–6	5–6		2–6	6–1	6–1	6–2	6–3	8, 32–25
4	(England) Dennis Priestley	5–6	2–6	6–2		5–6	6–3	6–5	6–3	8, 36–31
5	(England) Mark Dudbridge	1–6	5–6	1–6	6–5		6–5	6–1	6–4	8, 31–33
6	(England) Alan Tabern	6–5	5–6	1–6	3–6	5–6		6–2	6–5	6, 32–36
7	(Netherlands) Jelle Klaasen	1–6	1–6	2–6	5–6	1–6	2–6		6–5	2, 18–41
8	(England) Steve Brown	4–6	4–6	3–6	3–6	6–4	5–6	5–6		0, 28–42

Semi-final
1	(Canada) John Part	5
4	(England) Dennis Priestley	6
2	(England) Kevin Painter	6
3	(Netherlands) Vincent v d Voort	4

Final
4	(England) Dennis Priestley	6
2	(England) Kevin Painter	5

== Winners Group ==
The winners group was played on 20 October 2011 and won by Phil Taylor, who in the group phase achieved the second nine dart finish of the tournament by checking out 141 with double 12.

		Tay	Kin	Nic	Bea	Wal	And	Pri	Whi	Points, Legs
1	(England) Phil Taylor		6–3	6–1	6–3	6–3	6–5	6–2	6–5	14, 42–22
2	(England) Mervyn King	3–6		2–6	6–0	6–3	3–6	6–2	6–3	8, 33–26
3	(Australia) Paul Nicholson	1–6	6–2		2–6	6–3	6–1	5–6	6–2	8, 32–27
4	(England) Steve Beaton	3–6	0–6	6–2		3–6	6–2	4–6	6–3	6, 28–31
5	(England) Mark Walsh	3–6	3–6	3–6	6–3		2–6	6–1	6–5	6, 29–33
6	(Scotland) Gary Anderson	5–6	6–3	1–6	2–6	6–2		2–6	6–4	6, 28–33
7	(England) Dennis Priestley	2–6	2–6	6–5	6–4	1–6	6–2		3–6	6, 26–35
8	(Australia) Simon Whitlock	5–6	3–6	2–6	3–6	5–6	4–6	6–3		2, 28–39

Semi-final
1	(England) Phil Taylor	6
4	(England) Steve Beaton	1
2	(England) Mervyn King	3
3	(Australia) Paul Nicholson	6

Final
1	(England) Phil Taylor	6
3	(Australia) Paul Nicholson	1

== Coverage ==
The tournament was streamed worldwide through the PDC website. It was also streamed through thirty bookmaker websites.

Bookmaker website	Streamed in
12bet	Worldwide
118 Bet	Asia
The Bet Arena	Asia
Bet24	Southern Europe
Bet365	Nordics
Betathome	Worldwide
betboo	South America
Betclic	Southern Europe * France
Betfair	UK, Ireland & Southern Europe
Bets 10	Southern Europe
Bwin	Germany, Austria, Switzerland
Danskespil	Denmark
Digibet	Germany, Austria, Switzerland
Expekt	Nordics
Favoritbet	Central and Eastern Europe
FDJ	France
Fortuna	Central and Eastern Europe
Fonbet	Russia
Forvetbet	Turkey
Goldbet	Italy
Hititbet	Southern Europe
NordicBet	Nordics
Paddy Power	UK & Ireland
Paris Mutual Urbain	France
Sportingbet	Mainland Europe
Stan James	UK & Ireland
TrioBet	CEE
Unibet	Europe
VivaroBet	CEE
William Hill	UK, Ireland & Australia
