= 2011 European Championship (darts) =

2011 PartyPoker.net European Championship

Tournament information
- Dates: 28–31 July 2011
- Venue: Maritim Hotel
- Location: Düsseldorf
- Country: Germany
- Organisation(s): PDC
- Format: Legs
- Prize fund: £200,000
- Winner's share: £50,000
- Nine-dart finish: (England) Adrian Lewis
- High checkout: 167 (Netherlands) Raymond van Barneveld (England) Wes Newton

Champion(s)
- (England) Phil Taylor

The 2011 PartyPoker.net European Championship was the fourth edition of the PDC tournament, the European Championship, which allowed the top European players to compete against the highest ranked players from the PDC Order of Merit. The tournament took place at the Maritim Hotel in Düsseldorf, Germany, from 28–31 July 2011, featuring a field of 32 players and £200,000 in prize money, with £50,000 going to the winner.

World number one Phil Taylor yet again successfully defended the title, after defeating Adrian Lewis 11–8 in the final.

== Prize money ==
Position (no. of players)		Prize money (Total: £200,000)
Winner	(1)	£50,000
Runner-Up	(1)	£20,000
Semi-finalists	(2)	£10,000
Quarter-finalists	(4)	£7,500
Last 16 (second round)	(8)	£5,000
Last 32 (first round)	(16)	£2,500

== Qualification ==
The top 16 players from the PDC Order of Merit after the World Matchplay automatically qualified for the event. The top 8 from these rankings were also the seeded players. The remaining 16 places went to the top 8 non-qualified players from the 2011 Players Championship Order of Merit, and then to the top 8 non-qualified players from the 2011 Continental Europe Order of Merit.

PDC Top 16
1. (England) Phil Taylor (champion)
2. (England) Adrian Lewis (runner-up)
3. (England) James Wade (quarter-finals)
4. (Scotland) Gary Anderson (second round)
5. (Australia) Simon Whitlock (semi-finals)
6. (Netherlands) Raymond van Barneveld (semi-finals)
7. (England) Wes Newton (second round)
8. (Wales) Mark Webster (first round)
9. (England) Terry Jenkins (second round)
10. (Australia) Paul Nicholson (quarter-finals)
11. (England) Andy Hamilton (first round)
12. (England) Mervyn King (second round)
13. (England) Mark Walsh (second round)
14. (England) Colin Lloyd (second round)
15. (England) Wayne Jones (first round)
16. (Netherlands) Vincent van der Voort (first round)

Players Championship qualifiers
1. (Canada) John Part (first round)
2. (England) Ronnie Baxter (second round)
3. (England) Andy Smith (first round)
4. (England) Jamie Caven (first round)
5. (England) Justin Pipe (first round)
6. (England) Dave Chisnall (second round)
7. (Scotland) Peter Wright (quarter-finals)
8. (England) Alan Tabern (first round)

European qualifiers
1. (Spain) Antonio Alcinas (first round)
2. (Belgium) Kim Huybrechts (quarter-finals)
3. (Netherlands) Jelle Klaasen (first round)
4. (Netherlands) Michael van Gerwen (first round)
5. (Austria) Mensur Suljović (first round)
6. (Greece) John Michael (first round)
7. (Netherlands) Co Stompé (first round)
8. (Sweden) Magnus Caris (first round)

== Draw and results ==
First round (best of 11 legs); 28–29 July
1	(England) Phil Taylor 107.83	6
(Greece) John Michael 87.94	3
(England) Mervyn King 96.30	6
(Netherlands) Co Stompé 88.01	1
8	(Wales) Mark Webster 87.79	4
(England) Terry Jenkins 94.63	6
(England) Justin Pipe 88.67	3
(Australia) Paul Nicholson 91.98	6
5	(Australia) Simon Whitlock 102.52	6
(Austria) Mensur Suljović 86.68	2
(England) Alan Tabern 85.77	4
(England) Colin Lloyd 92.48	6
4	(Scotland) Gary Anderson 97.35	6
(England) Jamie Caven 86.79	3
(Canada) John Part 83.03	5
(Scotland) Peter Wright 83.83	6
2	(England) Adrian Lewis 89.89	6
(Netherlands) Vincent van der Voort 79.80	4
(Netherlands) Jelle Klaasen 89.19	4
(England) Dave Chisnall 96.91	6
7	(England) Wes Newton 98.85	6
(England) Andy Smith 88.51	2
(Belgium) Kim Huybrechts 99.25	6
(Spain) Antonio Alcinas 96.19	2
6	(Netherlands) Raymond van Barneveld 101.98	6
(England) Andy Hamilton 94.96	4
(England) Wayne Jones 96.69	5
(England) Mark Walsh 99.41	6
3	(England) James Wade 92.08	6
(Sweden) Magnus Caris 79.85	1
(England) Ronnie Baxter 102.17	6
(Netherlands) Michael van Gerwen 101.09	4

Second round (best of 19 legs); 30 July
1	(England) Phil Taylor 102.47	10
(England) Mervyn King 90.71	3
(England) Terry Jenkins 96.57	4
(Australia) Paul Nicholson 101.61	10
5	(Australia) Simon Whitlock 96.84	10
(England) Colin Lloyd 83.75	2
4	(Scotland) Gary Anderson 90.65	5
(Scotland) Peter Wright 90.58	10
2	(England) Adrian Lewis 105.80	10
(England) Dave Chisnall 100.51	5
7	(England) Wes Newton 95.94	8
(Belgium) Kim Huybrechts 97.31	10
6	(Netherlands) Raymond van Barneveld 102.07	10
(England) Mark Walsh 100.53	5
3	(England) James Wade 101.81	10
(England) Ronnie Baxter 98.88	7

Quarter-finals (best of 19 legs); 31 July
1	(England) Phil Taylor 102.36	10
(Australia) Paul Nicholson 98.45	7
5	(Australia) Simon Whitlock 99.41	10
(Scotland) Peter Wright 94.79	6
2	(England) Adrian Lewis 99.81	10
(Belgium) Kim Huybrechts 95.72	8
6	(Netherlands) Raymond van Barneveld 97.95	10
3	(England) James Wade 93.60	8

Semi-finals (best of 21 legs); 31 July
1	(England) Phil Taylor 99.52	11
5	(Australia) Simon Whitlock 95.41	4
2	(England) Adrian Lewis 100.63	11
6	(Netherlands) Raymond van Barneveld 95.34	10

Final (best of 21 legs); 31 July
1	(England) Phil Taylor 109.29	11
2	(England) Adrian Lewis 98.72	8

Scores after player's names are three-dart averages (total points scored divided by darts thrown and multiplied by three)

== Statistics ==
Player	Played	Legs Won	Legs Lost	LWAT	100+	140+	180s	High checkout	3-dart average
(England) Phil Taylor	5	48	25	19	110	50	15	164	104.29
(England) Adrian Lewis	5	45	35	17	101	77	31	150	98.38
(England) James Wade	3	24	16	7	73	21	16	121	95.83
(Scotland) Gary Anderson	2	11	13	5	27	16	5	80	94.00
(Australia) Simon Whitlock	4	30	21	13	65	40	16	132	98.55
(Netherlands) Raymond van Barneveld	4	36	28	13	80	59	16	167	99.36
(England) Wes Newton	2	14	12	7	30	18	7	167	95.89
(Wales) Mark Webster	1	4	6	1	12	5	1	40	87.79
(England) Terry Jenkins	2	10	14	3	37	19	5	101	95.60
(Australia) Paul Nicholson	3	23	17	9	61	37	8	107	97.35
(England) Andy Hamilton	1	4	6	2	12	6	3	146	94.96
(England) Mervyn King	2	9	11	4	24	18	1	105	93.50
(England) Mark Walsh	2	11	15	4	43	20	6	120	99.97
(England) Colin Lloyd	2	8	14	2	33	12	2	110	88.12
(England) Wayne Jones	1	5	6	2	17	8	2	76	96.69
(Netherlands) Vincent van der Voort	1	4	6	1	10	4	1	58	79.80
(Canada) John Part	1	5	6	2	12	3	1	58	83.03
(England) Ronnie Baxter	2	11	14	4	37	16	11	116	100.52
(England) Andy Smith	1	2	6	1	14	3	1	20	88.51
(England) Jamie Caven	1	3	6	1	7	4	0	50	86.79
(England) Justin Pipe	1	3	6	2	9	8	1	121	88.67
(England) Dave Chisnall	2	11	14	8	22	17	6	116	98.71
(Scotland) Peter Wright	3	22	20	10	56	32	9	121	89.73
(England) Alan Tabern	1	4	6	1	8	9	0	76	85.77
(Spain) Antonio Alcinas	1	2	6	0	10	5	3	121	96.19
(Belgium) Kim Huybrechts	3	24	20	9	49	30	10	126	97.42
(Netherlands) Jelle Klaasen	1	4	6	2	10	6	2	41	89.19
(Netherlands) Michael van Gerwen	1	4	6	1	10	11	1	135	101.09
(Austria) Mensur Suljović	1	2	6	1	10	6	0	40	86.68
(Greece) John Michael	1	3	6	1	6	7	2	102	87.94
(Netherlands) Co Stompé	1	1	6	1	8	3	2	5	88.01
(Sweden) Magnus Caris	1	1	6	0	9	3	1	4	79.85

== Television coverage ==
The PDC announced on 24 June that ITV4 would broadcast the entire event live. ITV4 continued their coverage of PDC tournaments, having previously broadcast the 2008 European Championship, and the Grand Slam of Darts between 2007 and 2010.

The tournament was also broadcast on SPORT1 in Germany, RTL 7 in the Netherlands, and Fox Sports in Australia.
