= 2011 World Matchplay =

2011 Skybet World Matchplay

Tournament information
- Dates: 16–24 July 2011
- Venue: Winter Gardens
- Location: Blackpool, England
- Organisation(s): Professional Darts Corporation (PDC)
- Format: Legs; Final – best of 35
- Prize fund: £400,000
- Winner's share: £100,000
- Nine-dart finish: John Part
- High checkout: 170; Adrian Lewis; Wes Newton; James Wade

Champion(s)
- Phil Taylor (ENG)

The 2011 Skybet World Matchplay was the 18th annual staging of the World Matchplay, organised by the Professional Darts Corporation. The tournament took place from 16–24 July 2011. It was sponsored by Skybet (who had previously sponsored the UK Open and the World Grand Prix) who took over from Stan James after 10 years.

Phil Taylor successfully defended his title, defeating James Wade 18–8 in the final to win his twelfth World Matchplay crown and his fourth in successive years.

In the quarter-final, Andy Hamilton produced a remarkable comeback. Trailing 8–15 to Simon Whitlock and only one leg from defeat, Hamilton won nine consecutive legs to advance to the semi-finals.

John Part recorded his first and only televised nine-dart finish, and the third in Matchplay history, in his first-round defeat to Mark Webster.

The 2011 World Matchplay is notable for being the last darts tournament on Sky Sports where long-time commentator, Sid Waddell, commentated full-time. He was diagnosed with bowel cancer in September 2011, underwent treatment, and made a brief return to the commentary box during the 2012 Premier League Darts. Waddell died from the bowel cancer on the 11 August 2012, the day after his 72nd birthday.

== Prize money ==
For the third consecutive World Matchplay, the prize fund was £400,000.

Position (no. of players)		Prize money (Total: £400,000)
Winner	(1)	£100,000
Runner-Up	(1)	£50,000
Semi-finalists	(2)	£25,000
Quarter-finalists	(4)	£15,000
Second round	(8)	£7,500
First round	(16)	£5,000
Nine-dart finish	(1)	£10,000

== Qualification ==
The top 16 in the PDC Order of Merit qualified automatically and were also seeded players. The other 16 places went to the top 16 non-qualified players from the Players Championships Order of Merit.

These were the participants:

=== PDC Top 16 ===
1. (England) Phil Taylor (winner)
2. (England) Adrian Lewis (semi-finals)
3. (England) James Wade (runner-up)
4. (Scotland) Gary Anderson (first round)
5. (Australia) Simon Whitlock (quarter-finals)
6. (Netherlands) Raymond van Barneveld (quarter-finals)
7. (England) Terry Jenkins (first round)
8. (England) Wes Newton (quarter-finals)
9. (England) Mervyn King (first round)
10. (Wales) Mark Webster (quarter-finals)
11. (Australia) Paul Nicholson (second round)
12. (England) Ronnie Baxter (first round)
13. (England) Colin Lloyd (first round)
14. (England) Mark Walsh (second round)
15. (Netherlands) Vincent van der Voort (second round)
16. (England) Wayne Jones (second round)

=== PDPA Players Championship qualifiers ===
1. (Canada) John Part (first round)
2. (England) Andy Smith (first round)
3. (England) Jamie Caven (first round)
4. (England) Justin Pipe (second round)
5. (England) Dave Chisnall (first round)
6. (Scotland) Peter Wright (first round)
7. (England) Alan Tabern (first round)
8. (England) Mark Hylton (first round)
9. (England) Steve Brown (first round)
10. (England) Denis Ovens (second round)
11. (Scotland) John Henderson (second round)
12. (England) Kevin Painter (first round)
13. (England) Scott Rand (first round)
14. (England) Colin Osborne (first round)
15. (England) Steve Beaton (second round)
16. (England) Andy Hamilton (semi-finals)

== Draw ==
First round (best of 19 legs); 16–19 July
1	(England) Phil Taylor 101.66	10
(England) Mark Hylton 99.56	8
16	(England) Wayne Jones 90.83	10
(England) Scott Rand 88.99	6
8	(England) Wes Newton 90.80	10
(England) Andy Smith 84.12	2
9	(England) Mervyn King 84.22	6
(England) Justin Pipe 93.46	10
5	(Australia) Simon Whitlock 93.91	10
(Scotland) Peter Wright 92.28	7
12	(England) Ronnie Baxter 84.88	8
(England) Denis Ovens 87.59	10
4	(Scotland) Gary Anderson 98.04	6
(England) Andy Hamilton 95.97	10
13	(England) Colin Lloyd 84.92	7
(Scotland) John Henderson 91.11	10
2	(England) Adrian Lewis 98.07	14
(England) Kevin Painter 92.91	12
15	(Netherlands) Vincent van der Voort 86.45	10
(England) Alan Tabern 87.38	7
7	(England) Terry Jenkins 86.10	3
(England) Steve Beaton 100.97	10
10	(Wales) Mark Webster 88.95	10
(Canada) John Part 90.75	8
6	(Netherlands) Raymond van Barneveld 95.56	10
(England) Steve Brown 91.02	3
11	(Australia) Paul Nicholson 95.89	12
(England) Colin Osborne 95.86	10
3	(England) James Wade 87.38	10
(England) Jamie Caven 82.00	0
14	(England) Mark Walsh 94.44	10
(England) Dave Chisnall 93.73	3

Second round (best of 25 legs); 20–21 July
1	(England) Phil Taylor 108.01	13
16	(England) Wayne Jones 97.89	7
8	(England) Wes Newton 99.41	13
(England) Justin Pipe 96.24	8
5	(Australia) Simon Whitlock 96.93	13
(England) Denis Ovens 88.06	1
(England) Andy Hamilton 90.45	13
(Scotland) John Henderson 86.11	11
2	(England) Adrian Lewis 100.30	13
15	(Netherlands) Vincent van der Voort 93.00	5
(England) Steve Beaton 90.40	7
10	(Wales) Mark Webster 93.70	13
6	(Netherlands) Raymond van Barneveld 95.67	13
11	(Australia) Paul Nicholson 92.35	9
3	(England) James Wade 98.08	13
14	(England) Mark Walsh 95.41	11

Quarter-finals (best of 31 legs); 22 July
1	(England) Phil Taylor 108.39	16
8	(England) Wes Newton 95.80	5
5	(Australia) Simon Whitlock 96.14	15
(England) Andy Hamilton 96.49	17
2	(England) Adrian Lewis 94.76	16
10	(Wales) Mark Webster 92.05	12
6	(Netherlands) Raymond van Barneveld 95.17	11
3	(England) James Wade 94.50	16

Semi-finals (best of 33 legs); 23 July
1	(England) Phil Taylor 105.59	17
(England) Andy Hamilton 99.43	9
2	(England) Adrian Lewis 91.54	10
3	(England) James Wade 95.37	17

Final (best of 35 legs); 24 July
1	(England) Phil Taylor 103.84	18
3	(England) James Wade 98.84	8

Scores after player's names are three-dart averages (total points scored divided by darts thrown and multiplied by 3)

== Statistics ==
Player	Eliminated	Played	Legs Won	Legs Lost	LWAT	100+	140+	180s	High checkout	3-dart average
(England) Phil Taylor	Winner	5	74	37	30	164	80	22	150	105.49
(England) Adrian Lewis	Semi-finals	4	53	46	19	118	66	28	170	96.16
(England) James Wade	Final	5	64	50	23	162	91	23	170	94.83
(Scotland) Gary Anderson	First round	1	6	10	1	27	7	10	104	98.04
(Netherlands) Raymond van Barneveld	Quarter-finals	3	34	28	13	79	48	16	126	95.46
(Australia) Simon Whitlock	Quarter-finals	3	38	25	12	66	48	15	154	95.66
(England) Terry Jenkins	First round	1	3	10	2	17	6	3	118	90.06
(England) Wes Newton	Quarter-finals	3	28	26	12	62	43	12	170	95.33
(England) Mervyn King	First round	1	6	10	3	17	10	1	120	84.33
(Wales) Mark Webster	Quarter-finals	3	35	31	13	96	36	7	158	91.56
(Australia) Paul Nicholson	Second round	2	21	23	8	55	24	12	164	94.12
(England) Ronnie Baxter	First round	1	8	10	3	17	10	3	146	84.88
(England) Colin Lloyd	First round	1	7	10	3	25	8	3	128	84.92
(England) Mark Walsh	Second round	2	21	16	5	46	22	12	121	94.92
(Netherlands) Vincent van der Voort	Second round	2	15	20	6	44	21	6	90	89.72
(England) Wayne Jones	Second round	2	17	19	6	43	32	9	161	94.36
(Canada) John Part*	First round	1	8	10	3	27	8	5	141	90.75
(England) Andy Smith	First round	1	2	10	0	20	5	1	121	84.12
(England) Jamie Caven	First round	1	0	10	0	12	4	1	—	82.00
(England) Justin Pipe	Second round	2	18	19	8	46	28	9	116	94.84
(England) Dave Chisnall	First round	1	3	10	1	14	9	5	121	93.73
(Scotland) Peter Wright	First round	1	7	10	2	27	8	6	123	92.28
(England) Alan Tabern	First round	1	7	10	4	31	9	3	81	87.38
(England) Mark Hylton	First round	1	8	10	2	18	15	7	119	99.57
(England) Steve Brown	First round	1	3	10	0	18	8	4	121	91.02
(England) Denis Ovens	Second round	2	11	21	4	45	20	5	132	87.82
(Scotland) John Henderson	Second round	2	21	20	7	46	30	11	120	88.61
(England) Kevin Painter	First round	1	12	14	5	39	15	5	102	92.91
(England) Scott Rand	First round	1	6	10	2	17	10	3	69	88.99
(England) Colin Osborne	First round	1	10	12	3	29	11	5	126	95.86
(England) Steve Beaton	Second round	2	17	16	8	49	24	3	140	95.68
(England) Andy Hamilton	Semi-finals	4	49	49	13	111	60	25	147	95.58

== Broadcasters ==
In the United Kingdom and Ireland, the tournament was broadcast by Sky Sports for the 18th consecutive time.
In the Netherlands, RTL7 broadcast the tournament for the very first time through an internet livestream, and in highlights on Friday, Saturday and Sunday on television.
The tournament was broadcast in Australia for the first time with Fox Sports.
