= 2014 World Matchplay =

2014 BetVictor World Matchplay

Tournament information
- Dates: 19–27 July 2014
- Venue: Winter Gardens
- Location: Blackpool, England
- Organisation(s): Professional Darts Corporation (PDC)
- Format: Legs
- Prize fund: £450,000
- Winner's share: £100,000
- Nine-dart finish: Phil Taylor
- High checkout: 167 Stephen Bunting

Champion(s)
- Phil Taylor (ENG)

The 2014 BetVictor World Matchplay was the 21st annual staging of the darts tournament, the World Matchplay, organised by the Professional Darts Corporation. The tournament took place at the Winter Gardens, Blackpool, from 19–27 July 2014.

Phil Taylor won the event for the seventh consecutive year and 15th in total by beating Michael van Gerwen 18–9 in the final. Taylor also threw the event's only nine-dart finish which he did in the second round against Michael Smith.

== Prize money ==
The prize fund was increased to £450,000 after being £400,000 for the previous five editions of this event. The bonus for a nine-dart finish stood at £10,000 and was won by Phil Taylor.

Position (no. of players)		Prize money (Total: £450,000)
Winner	(1)	£100,000
Runner-Up	(1)	£50,000
Semi-finalists	(2)	£27,000
Quarter-finalists	(4)	£17,500
Second round	(8)	£10,000
First round	(16)	£6,000
Nine-dart finish	(1)	£10,000

== Format ==
In previous stagings of the event all games had to be won by two clear legs with no sudden-death legs. However, in 2013 after consulting the host broadcaster Sky Sports, the PDC decided that games will now only proceed for a maximum of six extra legs before a tie-break leg is required. For example, in a best of 19 legs first round match, if the score reaches 12–12 then the 25th leg will be the decider.

== Qualification ==
The top 16 in the PDC Order of Merit qualified as seeded players. The other 16 places went to the top 16 non-qualified players from the PDC ProTour Order of Merit who are unseeded players.

=== PDC Top 16 ===
1. (Netherlands) Michael van Gerwen (runner-up)
2. (England) Phil Taylor (winner)
3. (England) Adrian Lewis (quarter-finals)
4. (Australia) Simon Whitlock (semi-finals)
5. (England) James Wade (quarter-finals)
6. (Scotland) Peter Wright (first round)
7. (Scotland) Robert Thornton (first round)
8. (England) Andy Hamilton (second round)
9. (England) Dave Chisnall (quarter-finals)
10. (England) Wes Newton (quarter-finals)
11. (Scotland) Gary Anderson (semi-finals)
12. (Northern Ireland) Brendan Dolan (first round)
13. (Netherlands) Raymond van Barneveld (second round)
14. (England) Mervyn King (second round)
15. (England) Justin Pipe (first round)
16. (England) Ian White (second round)

=== PDC ProTour qualifiers ===
1. (Belgium) Kim Huybrechts (first round)
2. (England) Steve Beaton (first round)
3. (Netherlands) Vincent van der Voort (first round)
4. (England) Jamie Caven (first round)
5. (England) Michael Smith (second round)
6. (England) Terry Jenkins (first round)
7. (England) Dean Winstanley (first round)
8. (England) Ronnie Baxter (first round)
9. (England) Kevin Painter (first round)
10. (England) Stephen Bunting (second round)
11. (England) Darren Webster (first round)
12. (England) Andrew Gilding (first round)
13. (England) Wayne Jones (first round)
14. (England) Andy Smith (first round)
15. (Australia) Paul Nicholson (second round)
16. (Wales) Richie Burnett (second round)

== Draw ==
First round (best of 19 legs); 19–21 July
1	(Netherlands) Michael van Gerwen 98.85	10
(England) Steve Beaton 92.77	7
16	(England) Ian White 101.37	10
(England) Terry Jenkins 91.28	4
8	(England) Andy Hamilton 94.42	10
(England) Wayne Jones 82.45	3
9	(England) Dave Chisnall 98.96	10
(England) Dean Winstanley 94.43	4
5	(England) James Wade 93.01	10
(England) Andy Smith 89.67	5
12	(Northern Ireland) Brendan Dolan 88.91	4
(Wales) Richie Burnett 93.85	10
4	(Australia) Simon Whitlock 93.88	10
(England) Kevin Painter 90.86	6
13	(Netherlands) Raymond van Barneveld 92.79	10
(Netherlands) Vincent van der Voort 89.10	4
2	(England) Phil Taylor 101.79	10
(England) Darren Webster 96.58	4
15	(England) Justin Pipe 96.66	8
(England) Michael Smith 98.87	10
7	(Scotland) Robert Thornton 97.06	8
(Australia) Paul Nicholson 94.95	10
10	(England) Wes Newton 81.99	11
(England) Ronnie Baxter 81.62	9
6	(Scotland) Peter Wright 89.12	6
(England) Stephen Bunting 92.36	10
11	(Scotland) Gary Anderson 94.47	10
(England) Jamie Caven 92.03	8
3	(England) Adrian Lewis 110.51	10
(England) Andrew Gilding 92.55	0
14	(England) Mervyn King 101.06	10
(Belgium) Kim Huybrechts 92.53	4

Second round (best of 25 legs); 22–23 July
1	(Netherlands) Michael van Gerwen 96.75	13
16	(England) Ian White 92.58	4
8	(England) Andy Hamilton 97.54	10
9	(England) Dave Chisnall 95.19	13
5	(England) James Wade 95.42	13
(Wales) Richie Burnett 87.42	2
4	(Australia) Simon Whitlock 93.54	13
13	(Netherlands) Raymond van Barneveld 86.78	8
2	(England) Phil Taylor 105.64	13
(England) Michael Smith 100.44	6
(Australia) Paul Nicholson 83.94	13
10	(England) Wes Newton 86.62	15
(England) Stephen Bunting 99.37	8
11	(Scotland) Gary Anderson 104.41	13
3	(England) Adrian Lewis 99.61	13
14	(England) Mervyn King 89.59	8

Quarter-finals (best of 31 legs); 24–25 July
1	(Netherlands) Michael van Gerwen 102.72	16
9	(England) Dave Chisnall 99.46	12
5	(England) James Wade 96.88	10
4	(Australia) Simon Whitlock 96.26	16
2	(England) Phil Taylor 99.70	16
10	(England) Wes Newton 89.16	6
11	(Scotland) Gary Anderson 100.63	16
3	(England) Adrian Lewis 95.00	8

Semi-finals (best of 33 legs); 26 July
1	(Netherlands) Michael van Gerwen 99.75	17
4	(Australia) Simon Whitlock 96.67	13
2	(England) Phil Taylor 105.27	17
11	(Scotland) Gary Anderson 105.68	15

Final (best of 35 legs); 27 July
1	(Netherlands) Michael van Gerwen 101.49	9
2	(England) Phil Taylor 107.19	18

== Statistics ==
Player	Eliminated	Played	Legs Won	Legs Lost	LWAT	100+	140+	180s	High checkout	3-dart average
(England) Phil Taylor	Winner	5	74	40	29	148	94	30	160	103.92
(Netherlands) Michael van Gerwen	Final	5	65	54	22	153	75	36	145	99.91
(Scotland) Gary Anderson	Semi-finals	4	54	41	18	124	75	33	145	101.30
(Australia) Simon Whitlock	Semi-finals	4	52	41	23	108	73	32	154	95.09
(England) Adrian Lewis	Quarter-finals	3	31	28	12	78	36	13	113	101.71
(England) Dave Chisnall	Quarter-finals	3	35	30	12	71	50	24	134	97.87
(England) James Wade	Quarter-finals	3	33	23	16	77	48	11	114	95.04
(England) Wes Newton	Quarter-finals	3	32	38	12	73	51	11	160	85.92
(England) Michael Smith	Second round	2	16	21	5	34	27	14	112	99.66
(England) Ian White	Second round	2	14	17	3	47	21	7	160	96.98
(England) Andy Hamilton	Second round	2	20	16	8	40	27	10	160	95.98
(England) Stephen Bunting	Second round	2	18	19	5	46	32	5	167	95.87
(England) Mervyn King	Second round	2	18	17	7	30	33	7	101	95.33
(Wales) Richie Burnett	Second round	2	12	17	6	52	19	4	121	90.64
(Netherlands) Raymond van Barneveld	Second round	2	18	17	10	38	30	10	132	89.79
(Australia) Paul Nicholson	Second round	2	23	23	10	57	31	6	142	89.45
(Scotland) Robert Thornton	First round	1	8	10	4	31	13	4	112	97.06
(England) Justin Pipe	First round	1	8	10	1	29	9	6	127	96.66
(England) Darren Webster	First round	1	4	10	1	19	11	3	92	96.58
(England) Dean Winstanley	First round	1	4	10	2	21	12	2	66	94.43
(England) Steve Beaton	First round	1	7	10	3	18	11	3	122	92.77
(England) Andrew Gilding	First round	1	0	10	0	11	7	2	–	92.55
(Belgium) Kim Huybrechts	First round	1	4	10	1	16	6	1	72	92.53
(England) Jamie Caven	First round	1	8	10	1	27	9	2	132	92.03
(England) Terry Jenkins	First round	1	4	10	0	15	9	4	60	91.28
(England) Kevin Painter	First round	1	6	10	3	18	14	3	92	90.86
(England) Andy Smith	First round	1	5	10	2	27	11	0	120	89.67
(Scotland) Peter Wright	First round	1	6	10	0	20	13	4	84	89.12
(Netherlands) Vincent van der Voort	First round	1	4	10	2	12	7	7	75	89.10
(Northern Ireland) Brendan Dolan	First round	1	4	10	1	18	9	1	91	88.91
(England) Wayne Jones	First round	1	3	10	2	13	8	2	96	82.45
(England) Ronnie Baxter	First round	1	9	11	3	23	7	3	81	81.62

Source: Match reports from the draw.
