= Championship League Darts =

Championship League

Tournament information
- Venue: Crondon Park GC
- Location: Stock, Essex
- Country: England
- Established: 2008
- Organisation(s): PDC
- Format: Legs
- Prize fund: £189,000 (2009)
- Month(s) Played: September/October
- Final Year: 2013

Final champion(s)
- (England) Phil Taylor

Championship League was a PDC darts tournament that used a league and legs format similar to the Premier League but offered the top players outside the top 8 in the PDC Order of Merit a chance to compete for the championship. It was the first ever darts tournament to be solely broadcast on and funded by Internet distribution.

The tournament was first announced on the official PDC website in mid-April under the name 'Championship of Darts'. It took place throughout September and October and featured a field of 29 players. The inaugural championship – the 2008 Championship League Darts – was held at the Crondon Park Golf Club in Essex and featured a prize fund of £189,000 and a place in the Grand Slam of Darts for the winner. Phil Taylor won the inaugural championship.

The final tournament was held in 2013.

== Internet coverage ==
As there were no spectators in the playing room, coverage was exclusive to the Internet. The choice to broadcast the tournament over the Internet had been partly inspired by the Championship League snooker event and was also a successor to the live streaming of certain matches from the Blue Square UK Open regional finals from the PDC Pro Tour. The streaming was aided by the company Perform, a digital sports agency. Live streaming of every game was available on several sports betting websites, and was available internationally except in the United States of America where, for legal reasons, the Championship could not be shown.

== Final results ==
Year	Champion	Score	Runner-up	Prize money		
Year	Champion	Score	Runner-up	Total	Champion	Runner-up
2008	(England) Phil Taylor	7–5	(England) Mervyn King	£189,000	£10,000	£5,000
2009	(England) Colin Osborne	6–4	(England) Phil Taylor	£189,000	£10,000	£5,000
2010	(England) James Wade	6–5	(England) Phil Taylor	£189,000	£10,000	£5,000
2011	(England) Phil Taylor	6–1	(Australia) Paul Nicholson	£189,000	£10,000	£5,000
2012	(England) Phil Taylor	6–4	(Australia) Simon Whitlock	£176,750	£10,000	£5,000
2013	(England) Phil Taylor	6–3	(Netherlands) Michael van Gerwen	£200,000	£10,000	£5,000

== Records and statistics ==
As of 24 October 2013.

=== Total finalist appearances ===
Rank	Player	Won	Runner-up	Finals	Appearances
1	(England) Phil Taylor	4	2	6	6
2	(England) Colin Osborne	1	0	1	6
2	(England) **James Wade**	1	0	1	6
4	(England) **Mervyn King**	0	1	1	6
4	(Australia) Paul Nicholson	0	1	1	4
4	(Australia) **Simon Whitlock**	0	1	1	4
4	(Netherlands) **Michael van Gerwen**	0	1	1	4

- Active players are shown in **bold**
- Only players who reached the final are included
- In the event of identical records, players are sorted by date first achieved

=== Champions by country ===
Country	Players	Total	First title	Last title
England	3	6	2008	2013
