= Paul Nicholson (darts player) =

English darts player

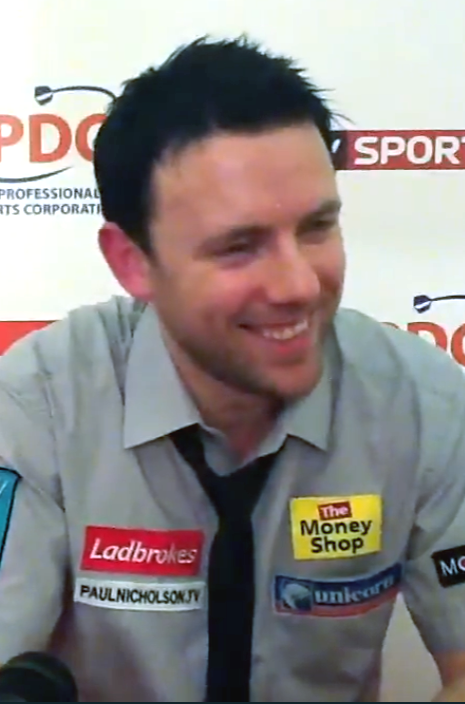
- Nicholson in 2011

Personal information
- Full name: Paul Michael Nicholson
- Nickname: "The Asset"
- Born: 10 May 1979 (age 47) Newcastle, England
- Home town: Blyth, Northumberland, England

Sport
- Sport: Darts
- Playing since: 1990
- Darts: 20g Winmau Signature
- Laterality: Right-handed
- Walk-on music: "Bad Reputation" by Joan Jett

Organisation (see split in darts)
- PDC: 2007–2019

PDC premier events – best performances
- World Championship: Quarter-final: 2009
- World Matchplay: Last 16: 2011, 2014
- World Grand Prix: Quarter-final: 2012
- UK Open: Quarter-final: 2011
- Grand Slam: Quarter-final: 2011
- European Championship: Quarter Final: 2011
- Championship League: Runner-up: 2011
- PC Finals: Winner (1): 2010

Other tournament wins
- Years
Australia Singles Matchplay	2008
Australian Open Players Championship	2009
DPA Australian Matchplay	2009
DPA Australian Singles	2007
Gaels Club Open	2008
Mildura Workers Club Open	2008 (×2)
Punchbowl Open	2009
Southern Illawarra Open	2008
Viva Las Vegas NZ	2008
Wagga Classic	2008
Young RSL Viva NZ	2008
Players Championships (×3)
2011 (×3)

Paul Michael Nicholson (born 10 May 1979) is an English former professional darts player who competed in Professional Darts Corporation (PDC) events. He won his only major title at the 2010 Players Championship Finals, where he defeated Mervyn King in the final. He was also the runner-up to Phil Taylor in the 2011 Championship League Darts, and part of the Australia team which lost a sudden death shoot-out to England in the 2012 PDC World Cup of Darts final.

Nicholson also acts as a sports commentator and TV and radio pundit. He was nicknamed "The Asset", and was known for coming on to the stage with sunglasses, and was also known for his professional wrestling-style walk ons, using the song "Club Foot" as his walk on music for most of his career. Nicholson had a feud with Phil Taylor during the 2011 UK Open, in which he supposedly "waved goodbye" to Taylor after beating him in a sudden death leg to reach the quarter-finals.

== Career ==
=== 2008/2009 ===
Raised in Cramlington then Blyth in Northumberland where he played darts at a local level, Nicholson relocated to Melbourne in 2005 to live with his Australian girlfriend. Before joining the PDC Pro Tour, Nicholson emerged as one of the top players in the Australian Grand Prix circuit, gaining confidence from competing with nationally-renowned opponents and winning 15 titles in 2008. His performances led him to the top of the DPA rankings and earned him a spot in the 2008 Grand Slam of Darts. He was drawn in Group H with Kevin Painter, Darryl Fitton and WDF number one Gary Anderson. Nicholson beat Anderson 5–4 in his opening group game despite booing from the crowd. He was then defeated by Fitton and Painter to exit the tournament.

Nicholson earned qualification for the 2009 PDC World Darts Championship through the DPA rankings. He defeated Adrian Gray in the first round, winning all nine legs for a three sets to nil victory. He then beat Adrian Lewis in the second round 4–3 and then came from two sets down to beat Dennis Priestley 4–2 to advance to the quarter-finals. In the quarter-finals, he lost to James Wade but his tournament performance lifted him into the top 50 on the PDC Order of Merit.

After his performance in the World Championship, Nicholson decided to leave the DPA and play in the PDC Pro Tour in an attempt to qualify for the UK Open. His last 16 place in the Southern Regional finals ensured his qualification for the tournament. He beat Gary Anderson 6 legs to 4 in the second round, before losing 9–7 to qualifier Ken Mather, whereafter his relationship with the spectators soured further, claiming Mather's supporters had repeatedly shouted out while he was throwing. After the match, as the crowd chanted "who are you" at Nicholson, he responded using profanity towards them which he was later fined for by the DRA.

Nicholson reached the semi-final of the PDPA Players Championship Barnsley 2, defeating Gary Mawson, Mark Dudbridge, John MaGowan, Justin Pipe and Denis Ovens before losing out to Colin Osborne. Nicholson did not enter the qualifiers for the Las Vegas Desert Classic and failed to qualify for the World Matchplay.

=== 2010 ===
In 2010, Nicholson claimed his first PDC title, The Totesport Player's Championship. He played the quarter-final, the semi-final and the final in the same day. In the quarter-final he defeated Adrian Lewis 9–7. He then overcame reigning champion Phil Taylor 10–9 in the semi-finals, and followed this up with a 13–11 victory over Mervyn King in the final. During the latter stages of the tournament, the crowd started to support Nicholson due to his efforts against higher ranked and more experienced opponents (in particular Taylor), and as a result he relaxed his behaviour leading pundits such as Alan Warriner-Little to suggest that he might give up the 'bad boy' image and just be himself. In March 2010, he moved into the top 16 of the PDC Order of merit for the first time. In the UK Open 2010, he beat Kirk Shepherd 9–6 in the third round, and 7–9 to Gary Anderson in the fourth round. On his World Matchplay debut, he lost 3–10 to Steve Beaton in the first round.

=== 2011 ===
In the 2011 World Championship, Nicholson continued reached the second round. He won his first title since January 2010 by winning the Crawley Players Championship (1) by defeating Adrian Lewis 6–4. He also came through a semi-final clash with Gary Anderson defeating him 6–5.

At the 2011 UK Open, Nicholson won final-leg deciders against Gary Anderson in round four, and Phil Taylor in round five, to reach the quarter-finals. He lost 7–10 to eventual champion James Wade.

At the 2011 World Matchplay, Nicholson defeated Colin Osborne in the first round to secure a second-round match with Raymond van Barneveld.

At the 2011 Championship League Darts, Nicholson lost 6–1 to Phil Taylor in the final.

=== 2012 ===
Nicholson made it to the last 16 of the 2012 World Championship by recording 3–1 and 4–0 victories over Mensur Suljović and Alan Tabern respectively. He next played Belgian Kim Huybrechts and won the first set, before losing 12 of the next 14 legs to exit the tournament 1–4.

After losing in the final of the Spanish Players Championship, Nicholson partnered Simon Whitlock again for the 2012 PDC World Cup of Darts. Together they had victories over Ireland, Belgium and the Netherlands to reach their first World Cup final, where they played the English pair of Phil Taylor and Adrian Lewis. Australia found themselves 0–3 down in the final, meaning that Nicholson had to beat Lewis in the last singles match and then win the doubles to force the tie to a sudden-death leg for the World Cup crown. Australia won both of the matches 7–4 and in the sudden-death leg Whitlock and Nicholson both missed two darts each to secure the title, with Lewis hitting the winning double for England. After the match Nicholson vowed that Australia would win the title in the future.

In June, Nicholson missed ten darts to reach the quarter-finals of the UK Open as he lost 8–9 to Denis Ovens in the last 16. In the World Matchplay he was beaten 6–10 by Andy Smith. After his 0–6 first round defeat to Andy Hamilton in the European Championship he did some commentating for ESPN who were broadcasting the tournament in the UK. At the World Grand Prix he beat Michael Mansell and Colin Osborne to reach his first quarter-final in the event. He faced Wes Newton and led 2–0 in sets, but was unable to take out 106 for a straight sets win and instead went on to lose 2–3. In October, he reached his first final since the World Cup in February at the fifth European Tour Event of the year, the Dutch Darts Masters. His run included a win over Michael van Gerwen, who had won four tournaments in the previous two months and a semi-final victory over Wayne Jones who beat Phil Taylor in the previous round. He faced compatriot Whitlock in a first all Australian final on the PDC ProTour and lost 1–6, admitting afterwards that he had run out of steam by the conclusion of the tournament. At the Grand Slam of Darts, Nicholson lost two out of his three Group F games to finish third in the table and fail to qualify for the last 16. After all 33 ProTour events of 2012 had been played, Nicholson was 18th on the Order of Merit, inside the top 32 who qualified for the Players Championship Finals. He missed one dart in the deciding leg against Ronnie Baxter in the first round, losing 5–6.

=== 2013 ===
Nicholson lost in the second round of the 2013 World Championship to Robert Thornton. He survived a total of five match darts from Thornton to take the match into a sudden death leg, which he lost. Nicholson never had a dart to win himself but did throw for the match during the final set. In his third World Cup of Darts with Simon Whitlock the pair were beaten in the last 16 when the Belgian brothers of Ronny and Kim Huybrechts defeated them 1–5. On 16 & 17 March 2013, Nicholson had wins over Dave Chisnall, Ross Smith, Darren Whittingham, Louis Blundell, Kim Huybrechts, Brendan Dolan, Co Stompé, Richie Burnett and Ronnie Baxter to secure back-to-back quarter final spots in the Speedy Services UK Open Qualifier 3 & Qualifier 4 events in Wigan. He was then whitewashed by Michael van Gerwen 6–0 in the quarter-final of Qualifier 3 and lost to 6–5 Gary Anderson the following day in the quarter-final of Qualifier 4. Nicholson competed a few weeks later at the European Darts Trophy in Sindelfingen, Germany. He saw off Ronny Huybrechts 6–5 in the first round before coming back from 5–1 down to defeat Colin Lloyd in the last 32. He then claimed wins over Dean Winstanley and Mark Webster to secure a semi-final clash with world number three Michael van Gerwen. He saw off van Gerwen 6–2 to face Wes Newton in the final. Nicholson missed nine darts to lead 5–3 and in the deciding leg had three darts to win the tournament on 24, but hit a single 12 with his first and burst his score by hitting a single 13 with his second and lost the match 5–6. He reached another final in May at the third Players Championship but was defeated 4–6 by Jamie Caven.

Nicholson lost 9–5 to John Bowles in the third round of the UK Open. In the opening round of the World Matchplay he saw 4–1 and 8–7 leads over Dave Chisnall turn into a 10–8 defeat and was in tears on the stage during the final leg. Nicholson said later that the feeling of not having enough during the match was too much to handle, but hoped the experience would be a starting point for a new phase in his career. He reached the last 16 of the Grand Slam of Darts losing heavily to James Wade 10–1.

=== 2014 ===
Nicholson beat Stuart Kellett 3–0 in the opening round of the 2014 World Championship, but Kevin Painter beat Nicholson 4–0 in the subsequent round. He co-commentated on the final, for BBC Radio 5 Live. Nicholson lost 9–5 to Terry Jenkins in the UK Open fourth round. Nicholson and Whitlock won through to the semi-finals of the World Cup of Darts where they faced England's Phil Taylor and Adrian Lewis in a repeat of 2012's final. Whitlock was beaten 4–1 by Taylor, before Nicholson overcame Lewis 4–2 to mean a doubles match was required to settle the tie which Australia lost 4–0. Nicholson overcame Robert Thornton 10–8 in the first round of the World Matchplay, explaining later that his form had suffered over the previous months due to pains in his neck and shoulders which he has worked with an acupuncturist to help relieve. In the second round, Wes Newton fought back from 5–0 and 8–3 deficits and went on to survive five match darts from Nicholson to knock him out 15–13. This was the last major Nicholson played in during the year as he failed to qualify for the World Grand Prix, European Championship, Grand Slam and Players Championship Finals.

=== 2015 ===
Nicholson walked onto the stage without sunglasses for the first time in his career at the 2015 World Championship in a further attempt to move away from his bad boy of darts image. His first-round match against Benito van de Pas went to a deciding set in which Nicholson lost all three legs to exit the tournament. He left his darts on the stage afterwards and said that he was unsure what he would do in the future. He returned to play the full schedule of events and qualified for the third round of the 2015 UK Open in which he drew Michael van Gerwen and lost 9–3. In the quarter-finals of the World Cup Nicholson knew a win over Belgium's Kim Huybrechts would see Australia reach the semis. He was 3–0 up but then missed a total of six match darts which led to him losing 4–3. Australia then lost the deciding doubles match 4–2. Nicholson failed to qualify for another PDC major event and could not get past the last 16 of any Pro Tour tournament. He fell outside the top 32 on the Order of Merit during the year and after losing in the first round of the qualifier it meant that missed out on playing in the World Championship for the first time since the 2008 event.

=== 2016 ===
Nicholson failed to qualify for the 2016 UK Open for the first time since the 2008 event. He reached the last 16 of one event all year, the 13th Players Championship, by beating Nathan Aspinall, Kyle Anderson (the player who has replaced him in Australia's World Cup team) and Simon Whitlock, but he then lost 6–1 to Benito van de Pas. He began commentating for the PDC during European Tour events and also for the BBC in the inaugural Champions League of Darts.

=== 2017 ===
Nicholson was a studio analyst and commentator on Channel 4's coverage of the 2017 BDO World Darts Championship. He was ranked 84th after the 2017 PDC World Championship and played in Q School to try and win his place on the tour back. He lost in the final round of the third day to Richie Burnett, before going all the way on the last day to earn a two-year Tour Card.

The rest of Nicholson's year was good enough to give him enough ranking money to qualify for the 2017 Players Championship Finals, although being the 59th seed meant he had to play Michael van Gerwen and lost 6–3.

=== 2018 ===
Nicholson qualified for the UK Open, where he lost to Paul Hogan 10–6 in the third round.

He won through to a European tour semi-final, where he was beaten by Adrian Lewis; this run effectively sealed his spot in the European Championships, as the 32nd seed, and the World Championships.

Nicholson made his return to the European Championship, where he was up against Michael van Gerwen. He opened with back-to-back twelve-darters, but missed darts to go 3–2 up, and failed to win another leg; he lost 6–2.

=== 2019 ===
He announced on 11 January that he will not attend the 2019 PDC Q School in an attempt to renew his tour card. He insisted he needed to work on his darts, game and head in order to get himself ready for 2020.

=== 2020 ===
Ahead of Q-School, Nicholson announced that he will no longer be representing Australia in an interview with the BDO

== Feud with Phil Taylor ==
In the 2011 UK Open, Nicholson defeated Phil Taylor in the last 16 by 9 legs to 8 and supposedly waved goodbye to him. While being interviewed at that year's World Matchplay, Nicholson spoke of Taylor's reaction and stated that when they met again, if Taylor did not bring his 'A' game he would "put him to bed". Nicholson defended the gesture saying: 'I was waving bye-bye to the demons which had dogged me in too many televised tournaments'. The comments garnered much media attention. Taylor reacted angrily to Nicholson's comments, telling BBC Radio Stoke, "I think he's very, very silly." Taylor added that Nicholson "has a big mouth and won't keep it shut". He played Taylor in an eagerly anticipated match at the 2011 European Darts Championships and was beaten 10–7, despite being 7–6 ahead. He was then defeated at the 2011 World Grand Prix by Taylor 3–0.

== CM Punk Association ==
During his walk-on in his second-round match against Raymond van Barneveld in the 2011 World Matchplay, Nicholson mimicked WWE wrestler CM Punk by having X's marked on his hands, and also lifted up a Nexus scarf. However, he lost the match, 13–9. Then, when he met Phil Taylor, he once again mimicked CM Punk during his walk-on, using his signature pose on one knee, shouting "It's clobberin' time" and punching the air. During Taylor's walk-on, Nicholson sat cross-legged on the stage, another trait of CM Punk, in an attempt to anger Taylor.

== Career finals ==
=== PDC major finals: 2 (1 title) ===
Outcome	No.	Year	Championship	Opponent in the final	Score (Note: (l) = score in legs, (s) = score in sets, (m) = score in matches.)
Winner	1.	2010	Players Championship Finals	Mervyn King	13–11 (l)
Runner-up	1.	2011	Championship League	Phil Taylor	1–6 (l)

=== PDC team finals: 1 (1 runner-up) ===
Outcome	No.	Year	Championship	Team	Teammate	Opponents in the final	Score
Runner-up	1.	2012	World Cup of Darts	Australia	Simon Whitlock	England – Phil Taylor and Adrian Lewis	3–4 (m)

== World Championship results ==
=== PDC ===
- 2009: Quarter-finals (lost to James Wade 3–5) (sets)
- 2010: First round (lost to Terry Jenkins 2–3)
- 2011: Second round (lost to Peter Wright 2–4)
- 2012: Third round (lost to Kim Huybrechts 1–4)
- 2013: Second round (lost to Robert Thornton 3–4)
- 2014: Second round (lost to Kevin Painter 0–4)
- 2015: First round (lost to Benito van de Pas 2–3)
- 2019: First round (lost to Kevin Burness 0–3)

== Performance timeline ==
Tournament	2008	2009	2010	2011		2012	2013	2014	2015	2017	2018	2019
PDC Ranked televised events
World Championship	DNP	QF	1R	2R		3R	2R	2R	1R	DNQ		1R
UK Open	DNP	3R	4R	QF		5R	3R	4R	3R	DNQ	3R	DNQ
World Matchplay	DNP	DNQ	1R	2R		1R	1R	2R	Did not qualify			
World Grand Prix	DNP	1R	1R	2R		QF	2R	Did not qualify				
European Championship	DNP	1R	1R	QF		1R	2R	DNQ			1R	DNQ
Grand Slam	RR	DNP	RR	QF		RR	2R	Did not qualify				
Players Championship Finals	NH	DNP	W	DNQ	1R	1R	1R	Did not qualify			1R	DNQ
Championship League	DNP		RR	F		RR	RR	Not held				
PDC Non-ranked televised events
World Cup	Not held		SF	Not held		F	2R	SF	QF	Did not qualify		

Performance Table Legend
W	Won the tournament	F	Finalist	SF	Semifinalist	QF	Quarterfinalist	#R; RR; Prel.	Lost in # round Round-robin; Preliminary round	DQ	Disqualified
DNQ	Did not qualify	DNP	Did not participate	WD	Withdrew	NH	Tournament not held	#R; RR; Prel.	Lost in # round Round-robin; Preliminary round	NYF	Not yet founded
