= Jamie Caven =

English darts player (born 1976)

Personal information
- Full name: Jamie Robert Caven
- Nickname: "Jabba"
- Born: 10 March 1976 (age 50) Leicester, England
- Home town: Derby, England

Sport
- Sport: Darts
- Playing since: 1993
- Darts: 23g XQ-Max Signature
- Laterality: Right-handed
- Walk-on music: "Tom Hark" by The Piranhas

Organisation (see split in darts)
- BDO: 2019
- PDC: 2007–2019 (Tour Card: 2011–2018)

PDC premier events – best performances
- World Championship: Last 16: 2016
- World Matchplay: Last 16: 2013
- World Grand Prix: Last 32: 2009, 2010, 2011, 2013, 2014, 2015, 2016
- UK Open: Quarter Final: 2009, 2012
- European Championship: Quarter Final: 2010, 2013
- Championship League: Semi Final: 2012
- Desert Classic: Last 32: 2009
- US Open/WSoD: Last 16: 2009
- PC Finals: Quarter Final: 2014

Other tournament wins
- Years
| Eyres Monsell Open | 2009 |
| Granite City Open | 2014 |
| Potteries Open | 2014 |
| Sportsdale.com Xmas Open | 2010 |
| World Youth Masters | 1993 |
Players Championships (x6)
| Players Championship (Derby) | 2011 |
| Players Championship (Dublin) | 2010 |
| Players Championship (Ontario) | 2010 |
| Players Championship (Salzburg) | 2009 |
| Players Championship (Wigan) | 2013 (x2) |
UK Open Regionals/Qualifiers
| UK Open Regional (Wales) | 2009 |

Jamie Robert Caven (born 10 March 1976) is an English former professional darts player who competed in Professional Darts Corporation and British Darts Organisation (BDO) events. He won seven PDC Pro Tour titles, including two in the same weekend in May 2013. Caven was also the 1993 World Youth Masters champion.

== Early life ==
Caven has no sight in his right eye, after being stung by a bee when he was 18 months old. At the age of 17, Caven won the World Youth Masters. When he was 20, tumours were found in his pancreas resulting in its removal and his requirement to have four insulin injections a day for the rest of his life. This is where his darts nickname Jabba originated.

== Career ==
Caven qualified for the 2008 World Championship at Alexandra Palace, and defeated Wes Newton in the first round 3–0, before playing Wayne Mardle in the second round, taking the first set before losing 4–1.

Caven won his first PDC title, by edging Alan Tabern in a final leg decider to win the UK Open Welsh Regional in Newport in May 2009. A month later he reached his first PDC major quarter-final at the UK Open, where he lost 10–3 to Colin Osborne.

Caven lost in the first round of the 2010 PDC World Championship to Gary Anderson 3–2.

He won his first round match of the 2011 World Championship by defeating South Africa's Devon Petersen, 3–2, but was then whitewashed 4–0 by Colin Osborne in the last 32.

Caven was seeded 18 for the 2012 World Championship but lost to Roland Scholten 1–3 in the first round. Caven trailed Joe Cullen 0–4 and 1–5 in the last 16 of the UK Open, but produced a superb comeback, concluding with a 160 finish in the deciding leg to take the match 9–8. He played Denis Ovens in the quarter-finals and lost 6–10. Caven qualified from Group 7 of the Championship League with a 6–4 victory against Paul Nicholson. He finished 2nd in the Winners Group, having won five of his seven league matches, but then lost to Simon Whitlock 4–6 in the semi-finals, having led 4–3. After all 33 ProTour events of 2012 had been played, Caven was 31st on the Order of Merit, just inside the top 32 who qualified for the Players Championship Finals. He lost to Whitlock 3–6 in the first round.

=== 2013 ===
Caven let a 2–1 set lead slip in the first round of the 2013 World Championship as he lost 2–3 to qualifier John Bowles. He reached the final of the fourth UK Open Qualifier in March, but lost to Robert Thornton 4–6 having defeated Gary Anderson 6–2 in the semi-finals. Caven won his first title for over two years in May at the third Players Championship, winning seven matches on the day concluding with a 6–4 victory over Paul Nicholson in the final. His form continued into the fourth event a day later as he won it by beating Jelle Klaasen 6–4 in the final with an incredible average of 110.68. An unlucky draw at the UK Open saw him face James Wade in the third round and he lost 7–9. At the European Championship, Caven beat Dave Chisnall 6–0 and Wade 10–2 to breeze into the quarter-finals. He played Simon Whitlock and led 9–3 only to suffer a huge comeback from the Australian as Caven lost seven legs in a row to be beaten 10–9. Caven fought back from 5–2 and 7–4 down to Wes Newton in the first round of the World Matchplay to win 10–8. He almost produced another turn around in his next game against Chisnall as he led 10–7 from being 6–2 down having twice set up the possibility of a nine darter by hitting back to back maximums. However, Caven then lost six legs in a row to exit the tournament. In October, he reached the final of the 11th Players Championship but was edged out 6–5 by Robert Thornton. He lost 9–4 to Justin Pipe in the second round of the Players Championship Finals having beaten Colin Lloyd 6–3 in the opener.

=== 2014 ===
Caven beat Jelle Klaasen 3–1 in the first round of the 2014 World Championship to set up a meeting with Raymond van Barneveld. Caven took the first set in a deciding leg by hitting a 136 finish with Van Barneveld waiting on 20 and then missed one dart to take a 2–0 lead, instead going on to trail 2–1. Caven won two successive sets to regain the advantage but could only win one more leg after this in a 4–3 defeat. He was the victim of a shock 5–3 defeat against Kevin Dowling in the second round of the UK Open. In May, he advanced to the semi-finals of an event for the first time in a year at the ninth Players Championship where he lost 6–2 against Peter Wright. Caven beat Terry Jenkins, Stephen Bunting, Phil Taylor and Wright all by 6–5 scorelines at the Austrian Darts Open to reach the final. He built a 5–2 lead over Vincent van der Voort, but went on to lose 6–5 without ever having a dart for the title. Caven was knocked out of the first round in the World Matchplay and World Grand Prix and the second round of the European Championship. He won a place in the Grand Slam of Darts through the qualifier but lost each of his group games to finish bottom of the table. Caven saw off Ian White 6–4 at the Players Championship Finals and was almost the victim of a huge fightback from Robert Thornton as he forced a deciding leg after having been 9–4 behind. However, he survived one match dart to win 10–9 and reach his only major quarter-final of the year where he faced Adrian Lewis. Caven missed a dart for the match at the bull to complete a 167 finish to win 10–8 and was instead eliminated 10–9.

=== 2015 ===
Caven lost 4–3 in the second round of the 2015 World Championship to Raymond van Barneveld for the second year in a row. There was never more than a set between the players, with Caven having the higher average, checkout percentage and winning more legs (15 to 14). He saw off Terry Jenkins 9–3 at the UK Open, before losing 9–6 to Devon Petersen in the fourth round. His first round meeting with Dave Chisnall at the World Matchplay went to extra legs, with Caven being edged out 13–11. He exited in the first round of the other two majors he reached in 2015 (2–0 in sets to Ian White at the World Grand Prix and 6–3 to Michael Smith at the Players Championship Finals). At the Dutch Darts Masters, Caven eliminated John Henderson 6–0, David Pallett 6–5 and Kim Huybrechts 6–2 to play in his only semi-final this year, but he lost 6–4 to Justin Pipe.

=== 2016 ===
Caven did not drop a set against Rob Szabo and Ricky Evans to reach the third round of the World Championship for the first time in his ninth appearance in the event. However, he was defeated 4–1 by James Wade. He lost 9–6 against Stephen Bunting in the fourth round of the UK Open. A 6–4 win over Dave Chisnall saw Caven play in his first final in nearly two years at the eighth Players Championship, but he was comfortably beaten 6–1 by Gerwyn Price. After missing darts at doubles in the second leg of his first round match with Michael van Gerwen at the World Matchplay, Caven did not get any more double chances as he was whitewashed 10–0. He averaged 79.98 to Van Gerwen's 105.85. He also had first round exits at the World Grand Prix, European Championship and Players Championship Finals.

=== 2017 ===
Caven entered the 2017 World Championship on a run of eight successive losses in all events. He was beaten 3–1 by Kevin Painter in the first round, losing the final six legs of the match.

=== 2018 ===
Caven failed to qualify for the 2018 World Championship for the first time in 10 years.

He qualified for the 2018 European Darts Grand Prix, eventually losing to Mensur Suljović in the second round.

=== 2019 ===
Caven once against failed to qualify for the 2019 World Championship he announced that in January he would be heading to Q-School in an attempt to regain his PDC Tour Card. Caven failed to regain his tour card and as a result has started playing in Challenge Tour events.

On 16 February Caven entered the BDO Scottish Open where he battled against near 1000 other players reaching the semi-finals. He gained 25 points on his BDO ranking.

Caven also played in the 2019 Slovak Darts Open and Masters where he did not enjoy the success he had seen in Scotland but managed to pick up more ranking points. Later Caven played in the 3-day Isle of Man Darts Classic where he reached the last 64 in the Open and the last 32 in the Masters.

=== 2020 – PDC ===
It was announced that he will be competing for a tour card at the 2020 Q School to join the Professional Darts Corporation, however he was unsuccessful.

== World Championship results ==
=== PDC ===
- 2008: Second round (lost to Wayne Mardle 1–4)
- 2009: First round (lost to Mark Walsh 2–3)
- 2010: First round (lost to Gary Anderson 2–3)
- 2011: Second round (lost to Colin Osborne 0–4)
- 2012: First round (lost to Roland Scholten 1–3)
- 2013: First round (lost to John Bowles 2–3)
- 2014: Second round (lost to Raymond van Barneveld 3–4)
- 2015: Second round (lost to Raymond van Barneveld 3–4)
- 2016: Third round (lost to James Wade 1–4)
- 2017: First round (lost to Kevin Painter 1–3)

== Performance timeline ==
| Tournament | 2008 | 2009 | 2010 | 2011 | 2012 | 2013 | 2014 | 2015 | 2016 | 2017 | 2018 |
|---|---|---|---|---|---|---|---|---|---|---|---|
| PDC World Championship | 2R | 1R | 1R | 2R | 1R | 1R | 2R | 2R | 3R | 1R | DNQ |
| UK Open | 2R | QF | 4R | 3R | QF | 3R | 2R | 4R | 4R | 3R | DNQ |
| World Matchplay | DNQ | 1R | 1R | 1R | DNQ | 2R | 1R | 1R | 1R | DNQ | |
| World Grand Prix | DNQ | 1R | 1R | 1R | DNQ | 1R | 1R | 1R | 1R | DNQ | |
| European Championship | DNQ | | QF | 1R | DNQ | QF | 2R | DNQ | 1R | DNQ | |
| Grand Slam of Darts | Did not qualify | | | | | | RR | Did not qualify | | | |
| Players Championship Finals | DNQ | 1R | 1R | 2R | 1R | 2R | QF | 1R | 1R | 2R | DNQ |
| Championship League Darts | DNQ | | RR | RR | SF | RR | Not held | | | | |
Career statistics
| Year-end ranking | NA | 25 | 19 | 18 | 31 | 23 | 19 | 22 | 30 | 39 | 68 |

=== PDC European Tour ===
| Season | 1 | 2 | 3 | 4 | 5 | 6 | 7 | 8 | 9 | 10 | 11 | 12 | 13 |
|---|---|---|---|---|---|---|---|---|---|---|---|---|---|
| 2012 | ADO; 1R | GDC; 1R | EDO; 1R | GDM; 1R | DDM; 1R | | | | | | | | |
| 2013 | UKM; 2R | EDT; 2R | EDO; SF | ADO; 2R | GDT; 3R | GDC; 1R | GDM; 1R | DDM; 1R | | | | | |
| 2014 | GDC; 2R | DDM; 2R | GDM; 2R | ADO; F | GDT; 3R | EDO; QF | EDG; 3R | EDT; 2R | | | | | |
| 2015 | GDC; 1R | GDT; DNQ | GDM; 3R | DDM; SF | IDO; 2R | EDO; DNQ | EDT; DNP | EDM; 1R | EDG; 2R | | | | |
| 2016 | DDM; 1R | GDM; DNQ | GDT; DNQ | EDM; 3R | ADO; 2R | EDO; 2R | IDO; 1R | EDT; 2R | EDG; DNQ | GDC; DNQ | | | |
| 2017 | GDC; DNQ | GDM; DNQ | GDO; DNQ | EDG; DNQ | GDT; DNQ | EDM; DNQ | ADO; DNQ | EDO; DNQ | DDM; DNQ | GDG; 2R | IDO; DNQ | EDT; 2R | |
| 2018 | EDO; DNQ | GDG; DNQ | GDO; DNQ | ADO; DNQ | EDG; 2R | DDM; DNP | GDT; DNQ | DDO; DNQ | EDM; DNQ | GDC; DNQ | DDC; DNQ | IDO; DNQ | EDT; DNQ |

=== PDC Players Championships ===
| Season | 1 | 2 | 3 | 4 | 5 | 6 | 7 | 8 | 9 | 10 | 11 | 12 | 13 | 14 | 15 | 16 | 17 | 18 | 19 | 20 | 21 | 22 | 23 | 24 | 25 | 26 | 27 | 28 | 29 | 30 | 31 | 32 | 33 | 34 | 35 | 36 | 37 |
|---|---|---|---|---|---|---|---|---|---|---|---|---|---|---|---|---|---|---|---|---|---|---|---|---|---|---|---|---|---|---|---|---|---|---|---|---|---|
| 2007 | GIB; 1R | GIB; 3R | BAD; 2R | Did not participate | | | | | | BLA; 2R | Did not participate | | | | | | | | | | | | | | | | | | | | | | | | | | |
| 2008 | GIB; 1R | GIB; 3R | ESS; 1R | WIG; PR | BAS; 1R | BAS; 4R | TEL; 2R | TEM; 1R | GLA; 4R | AMS; 1R | BRI; PR | BRI; 4R | LVE; DNP | BLA; 2R | NSW; DNP | KIT; DNP | ATL; DNP | EIN; 3R | EIN; 2R | DRO; 2R | CHI; DNP | NEW; F | NEW; 1R | DUB; 1R | DUB; SF | IRV; 1R | IRV; SF | KIR; 3R | KIL; QF | LEI; 4R | LEI; 3R | | | | | | |
| 2009 | DON; 2R | GIB; 2R | GIB; 3R | GLA; 3R | GLA; 3R | IRV; 4R | WIG; 1R | BRE; 3R | COV; 4R | NUL; 2R | NUL; 3R | TAU; 4R | DER; 3R | NEW; 3R | BAR; F | BAR; 1R | DIN; 4R | DIN; 1R | LVE; 3R | SYD; DNP | ONT; DNP | ATL; QF | ATL; 4R | SAL; 2R | SAL; W | DUB; 2R | DUB; SF | KIL; SF | NUL; 4R | NUL; 4R | IRV; 1R | IRV; 2R | | | | | |
| 2010 | GIB; QF | GIB; 2R | SWI; SF | DER; QF | GLA; SF | GLA; 1R | WIG; 1R | CRA; 3R | BAR; 2R | DER; 3R | WIG; 4R | WIG; QF | SAL; 4R | SAL; SF | BAR; 4R | BAR; 3R | HAA; 4R | HAA; 2R | LVE; DNP | LVE; 3R | LVE; 4R | SYD; DNP | ONT; W | ONT; F | CRA; 2R | CRA; SF | NUL; QF | NUL; 4R | DUB; 3R | DUB; W | KIL; QF | BAD; 2R | BAD; QF | BAR; 4R | BAR; 3R | DER; 2R | DER; 2R |
| 2011 | HAL; 2R | HAL; 3R | DER; W | DER; QF | CRA; 4R | CRA; 2R | VIE; 3R | VIE; 4R | CRA; 3R | CRA; 2R | BAR; 3R | BAR; 2R | NUL; 3R | NUL; 4R | ONT; SF | ONT; 3R | DER; 2R | DER; 2R | NUL; 2R | NUL; 2R | DUB; 2R | DUB; QF | KIL; 2R | GLA; 2R | GLA; QF | ALI; 3R | ALI; SF | CRA; 4R | CRA; 3R | WIG; 2R | WIG; 3R | | | | | | |
| 2012 | ALI; 3R | ALI; 1R | REA; 3R | REA; QF | CRA; 3R | CRA; 4R | BIR; 4R | BIR; 1R | CRA; 1R | CRA; 3R | BAR; 1R | BAR; 3R | DUB; 1R | DUB; 1R | KIL; 4R | KIL; SF | CRA; 3R | CRA; 3R | BAR; 2R | BAR; 4R | | | | | | | | | | | | | | | | | |
| 2013 | WIG; 2R | WIG; 4R | WIG; W | WIG; W | CRA; 3R | CRA; QF | BAR; 2R | BAR; 2R | DUB; 3R | DUB; 3R | KIL; F | KIL; 3R | WIG; QF | WIG; 4R | BAR; 3R | BAR; 2R | | | | | | | | | | | | | | | | | | | | | |
| 2014 | BAR; 1R | BAR; 1R | CRA; 3R | CRA; 3R | WIG; 3R | WIG; 1R | WIG; 2R | WIG; 4R | CRA; SF | CRA; 1R | COV; 2R | COV; 4R | CRA; 2R | CRA; 4R | DUB; 3R | DUB; 4R | CRA; 1R | CRA; 4R | COV; 3R | COV; 2R | | | | | | | | | | | | | | | | | |
| 2015 | BAR; 1R | BAR; 1R | BAR; 1R | BAR; 3R | BAR; 3R | COV; 1R | COV; 1R | COV; 1R | CRA; 1R | CRA; 3R | BAR; 3R | BAR; 3R | WIG; 2R | WIG; 2R | BAR; 1R | BAR; 4R | DUB; 1R | DUB; 3R | COV; 3R | COV; 1R | | | | | | | | | | | | | | | | | |
| 2016 | BAR; 3R | BAR; 3R | BAR; 3R | BAR; 1R | BAR; 1R | BAR; 4R | BAR; 1R | COV; F | COV; 4R | BAR; 2R | BAR; 3R | BAR; 2R | BAR; 1R | BAR; 1R | BAR; 2R | BAR; 2R | DUB; 2R | DUB; 2R | BAR; 1R | BAR; 1R | | | | | | | | | | | | | | | | | |
| 2017 | BAR; 1R | BAR; 3R | BAR; 4R | BAR; 1R | MIL; 1R | MIL; 1R | BAR; 1R | BAR; 2R | WIG; 1R | WIG; 1R | MIL; 1R | MIL; 2R | WIG; 2R | WIG; 1R | BAR; 1R | BAR; 2R | BAR; 1R | BAR; 3R | DUB; 2R | DUB; 1R | BAR; 3R | BAR; SF | | | | | | | | | | | | | | | |
| 2018 | BAR; 1R | BAR; 1R | BAR; 2R | BAR; QF | MIL; 1R | MIL; 1R | BAR; 3R | BAR; 1R | WIG; 2R | WIG; 2R | MIL; 1R | MIL; 1R | WIG; 1R | WIG; 1R | BAR; 1R | BAR; 1R | BAR; 2R | BAR; 1R | DUB; 1R | DUB; 1R | BAR; 3R | BAR; 2R | | | | | | | | | | | | | | | |

=== PDC Challenge Tour ===
| Season | 1 | 2 | 3 | 4 | 5 | 6 | 7 | 8 | 9 | 10 | 11 | 12 | 13 | 14 | 15 | 16 | 17 | 18 | 19 | 20 | 21 | 22 | 23 | 24 |
|---|---|---|---|---|---|---|---|---|---|---|---|---|---|---|---|---|---|---|---|---|---|---|---|---|
| 2019 | WIG; DNP | | WIG; L256 | WIG; L256 | WIG; DNP | | | | PET; L256 | PET; L256 | PET; DNP | | WOL; DNP | | | | WIG; DNP | | | | | | | |
| 2020 | WIG; L256 | WIG; DNP | WIG; L128 | WIG; L64 | BAR; Did not participate | | | | | | | | | | | | | | | | | | | |
| 2022 | WIG; L256 | WIG; L16 | WIG; L512 | WIG; L256 | WIG; DNP | HIL; Did not participate | | | | | | | | | | LEI; L256 | LEI; L16 | LEI; L256 | LEI; L128 | LEI; L64 | LEI; DNP | | LEI; L64 | LEI; L128 |

Performance Table Legend
| W | Won the tournament | F | Finalist | SF | Semifinalist | QF | Quarterfinalist | #R; RR; Prel. | Lost in # round Round-robin; Preliminary round | DQ | Disqualified |
| DNQ | Did not qualify | DNP | Did not participate | WD | Withdrew | NH | Tournament not held | #R; RR; Prel. | Lost in # round Round-robin; Preliminary round | NYF | Not yet founded |

== Career finals ==
=== PDC European tour finals: 1 ===
Legend
Other (0–1)

| Outcome | No. | Year | Championship | Opponent in the final | Score |
|---|---|---|---|---|---|
| Runner-up | 1. | 2014 | Austrian Darts Open | Vincent van der Voort | 5–6 (l) |
