= Mark Hylton (darts player) =

English darts player

Personal information
- Nickname: Mile High
- Born: 30 May 1966 (age 60) London, England
- Home town: Rugeley, Staffordshire, England

Sport
- Sport: Darts
- Playing since: 1997
- Darts: 20 Gram Bob Anderson
- Laterality: Left-handed
- Walk-on music: "Danger Zone" by Kenny Loggins

Organisation (see split in darts)
- PDC: 2007–2017

PDC premier events – best performances
- World Championship: Last 16: 2011
- World Matchplay: Last 32: 2011
- World Grand Prix: Quarter-finalist: 2011
- UK Open: Quarter-finalist: 2011
- Grand Slam: Group stage: 2010

Other tournament wins
- Years
Barn Social Club Witton	2011
Blackburn VIP Snooker Lounge Open	2011
Border Classic	2010
Brakens KO	2009
Brookmeadow Open	2010
Cotgrave Open	2011
Erdington Day of Darts (301)	2011
LPKD Annual 301 Special	2010
LPKD Red Lion Erdington	2011, 2011
LPKD Stirchely WMC Open	2010
LPKD Tamworth Open	2010
LPKD The Hasbury Inn	2010, 2011
LPKD The Pint Pot	2009, 2010 (x5), 2011, 2011
Rainhill Open	2011
Retford Open	2011
Tat Bank Open	2009
Worcester Open	2010

Mark Hylton (born 30 May 1966) is an English former professional darts player who competed in Professional Darts Corporation (PDC) events.

== Career ==
Hylton has played darts for over 30 years. He has played super league for many years and earned over 80 caps for Staffordshire.

In 1997, he reached the last 16 of the inaugural British Classic (losing to Phil Taylor). In 2005, he was the Staffordshire qualifier for the World Championship play-offs as well as the World Masters and the English national singles, where he reached the last 16 again.

Hylton's first televised appearance came as an amateur qualifier at the 2007 UK Open. He defeated Ray Carver on the stage in the preliminary round before losing to Mark Robinson in the first round.

He joined the PDC circuit full-time in 2010. Despite failing to qualify for that year's UK Open, he reached the final of a PDC Pro Tour event in Australia, losing to Dennis Priestley, and has regularly featured in the last 16 places. Alongside his PDC efforts, Hylton has won 13 open competitions in 2010, including the Border Classic.

Hylton qualified for the 2010 Grand Slam of Darts, winning through a strong field of over 250 darters, as one of four ITV Wildcard qualifiers. He lost all three of his group games to Gary Anderson, Mark Webster, and Wayne Jones.

Hylton also qualified for his first PDC World Championship in 2011 as one of the top 16 non-seeded players from the Players Championship Order of Merit. In the first round, Hylton defeated Steve Beaton by 3 sets to 2. In the second round, he knocked out number 9 seed Colin Lloyd by 4 sets to 2. He was eliminated by Mark Webster in the third round. These strong TV performances along with Hylton's strong second half of the season also earned him the 2010 PDC Best Newcomer award. In 2011, Hylton took several open titles including The Double16.com Cotgrave & Newark Opens during the 2nd of which he produced a perfect 9 dart leg, only 6 days later he produced another 9 dart finish during an Open event at The Red Lion in Erdington.

During May & June 2011 Hylton reached Pro tour Quarter and Semi finals on consecutive days in Austria and a run of five wins (over Brian Woods, Geoff Whitworth, Andy Jenkins, Andrew Gilding & Peter Wright) at The UK Open saw 'Mile High' reach his first televised quarter final at a major event, eventually losing out in a match again Denis Ovens.

This form continued with a semi-final Pro Tour place in Barnsley, defeating Beaton, Ovens, Baxter, Van Gerwen & Duo before losing out to lakeside runner up Dave Chisnal. This ensured his place in the 2011 World Matchplay where he faced Phil Taylor in the first round, narrowly losing by 10 legs to 8.

His rapid rise through the ranking continued with qualification for the 2011 World Grand Prix, where he reached the quarter-final. A two sets to one win over Mark Walsh in round one followed by a second round 3–1 win over Simon Whitlock, set up a clash with Richie Burnett. Hylton bowed out 1–4.

At PDC Pro Tour events, he reached semi and quarter-finals over the next two events. He recorded wins over Wayne Jones and a 6-0 whitewash of Paul Nicholson.

He was defeated in the first round of the 2012 World Championships by Vincent van der Voort 2–3. Hylton lost 7–9 in the last 32 of the 2012 UK Open to Jamie Caven. On the 2012 Pro Tour, his best results were quarter-final defeats in the UK Open Qualifier 8 (4–6 to Joe Cullen) and the 10th Players Championship (4–6 to Andy Hamilton). His results were not enough to see him qualify for the 2013 World Championship through the Pro Tour Order of Merit so he played in the Qualifier and lost in the last 16 to Stuart Kellett. After the World Championship Hylton was ranked world number 37.

Hylton failed to qualify for the 2013 UK Open as he finished 115th on the Order of Merit, outside of the top 96 who claimed their places. He played the full schedule of PDC events but only reached the last 32 of one tournament where he lost 6–3 to Kim Huybrechts. Hylton finished a lowly 114th on the ProTour Order of Merit having earned £2,400 in prize money during the whole year. He dropped 48 places on the main Order of Merit during the year to start 2014 as world number 85, outside the top 64 who retain their professional status. Hylton entered Q School in an attempt to win his place back and came closest to doing so on the first day when he was beaten 5–4 by Joey ten Berge in the last 16. However, after all four days had been completed he had not won enough games to qualify through the Order of Merit and just had PDPA Associate Member status for 2014 which enabled him to play in all UK Open and European Tour qualifiers as well as the Challenge Tour. Hylton qualified for the UK Open but lost 5–1 to Dennis Smith in the first round. He played in 10 of the 16 Challenge Tour tournaments, reaching the semi-finals of the 11th event where he was defeated 5–4 by Mark Frost.

Hylton was knocked out in the quarter-finals of two Challenge Tour events in 2015 and got to the semi-finals of the fifth event in 2016 and lost 5–2 to Nick Fullwell.

== World Championship results ==
=== PDC ===
- 2011: Third round (lost to Mark Webster 1–4)
- 2012: First round (lost to Vincent van der Voort 2–3)

== Personal life ==
Hylton worked as an airline cabin manager for 14 years before taking redundancy and becoming a professional darts player in 2010. He graduated from Wrexham University in 1987 as a BA in English Literature.

Hylton‘s son is professional comedian Alex Hylton, who won ‘Best Show’ at Leicester Comedy Festival in 2020.

Hylton supports Sky Bet Championship football club Stoke City. He also played cricket at an amateur level as a teenager.

He currently works at Morrisons supermarket
