= Colin Osborne =

English darts player (born 1975)

Personal information
- Nicknames: "Ozzy" "The Wizard"
- Born: 19 June 1975 (age 51) Middlesbrough, England
- Home town: Derby, England

Sport
- Sport: Darts
- Playing since: 1989
- Darts: 20g Winmau
- Laterality: Right-handed
- Walk-on music: "Unbelievable" by EMF

Organisation (see split in darts)
- PDC: 2005–

PDC premier events – best performances
- World Championship: Quarter-final: 2007
- World Matchplay: Last 16: 2008
- World Grand Prix: Last 16: 2008, 2010, 2012
- UK Open: Runner-up: 2009
- Grand Slam: Last 16: 2010
- European Championship: Last 16: 2009
- Championship League: Winner (1): 2009
- Desert Classic: Last 16: 2007
- US Open/WSoD: Last 16: 2008
- PC Finals: Semi-final: 2010

Other tournament wins
- Years
Players Championships (×4)
2008, 2009 (×2), 2011
UK Open Regionals/Qualifiers
Regional Final (NEE)	2008

Colin Osborne (born 19 June 1975) is an English professional darts player who competes in Professional Darts Corporation (PDC) events. He won the 2009 Championship League Darts and reached the final of the 2009 UK Open.

== Darts career ==
Osborne has won two PDC Pro Tour events and he also managed to hit two nine-dart finishes in 2005. The first one of these came in the Players Championship on the Isle of Wight and a second one followed at the non-televised qualifying rounds for the 2005 World Matchplay.

On his World Championship debut in 2007, Osborne reached the quarter-finals where he was beaten 5–4 by Andy Jenkins. At the 2007 UK Open, he beat Michael van Gerwen and Mervyn King as he reached the semi-final only to be beaten 11–10 in a against Vincent van der Voort. He followed this success with victory against James Wade in Las Vegas, only to lose to Peter Manley in the second round.

Osborne suffered a first-round exit in the 2008 World Championship, losing 3–1 to Dutchman Erwin Extercatte. In the 2008 World Matchplay, he beat King in the first round, but then lost in the next round to Phil Taylor. Osborne was 10–0 down before winning a leg, eventually losing 13–5 with Taylor averaging 109.

In the 2009 PDC World Championship, Osborne beat South Africa's Charles Losper 3–0 in the first round, before losing 4–1 to van der Voort in the second round.

2009 was a breakthrough year for Osborne, as he reached his first major final in the 2009 UK Open. Having beaten Raymond van Barneveld, Jamie Caven and Kevin Painter in the earlier rounds, he lost 11–6 to Taylor in the final. He also won the 2009 Championship League Darts, defeating Taylor 6–4 in the final, but a disappointing year in the other majors was compounded with a first-round loss to Simon Whitlock in the 2010 World Championship, a match that was dubbed "The Battle of the Wizards" due to both players being nicknamed 'The Wizard'.

In 2010, Osborne reached the semi-finals of the Players Championship Finals before losing to King. At the Grand Slam of Darts, Osborne lost his opening group match to Robert Thornton before beating Whitlock and Dave Chisnall to qualify for the knockout stages. He lost 10–3 to Gary Anderson in the last 16. He then reached the third round of the 2011 World Championship, and was 3–2 up against van Barneveld before losing 4–3.

=== Nickname ===
Between 2005 and 2010, Osborne was nicknamed The Wizard, a reference to The Wizard of Oz. He has long been known on the circuit, most notably by commentator Sid Waddell as Ozzy, a reference to both The Wizard of Oz and to rock singer Ozzy Osbourne. Due to the latter, he used the song "Paranoid" by Ozzy's band Black Sabbath as his walk-on. In 2011, he officially changed his nickname to 'Ozzy', following the increasing prominence of Simon Whitlock, who is also nicknamed 'The Wizard'.

== Outside darts ==
Osborne is a former representative of the English table tennis team. He is also a former yo-yo champion and enjoys golf and snooker.

Osborne was born in Middlesbrough, but now lives in Derby with his wife Sarah. The couple have two sons, Colin Jr. (born 2003) and Alfie (born 2006). For about 18 months, Colin and Sarah were the landlords of the Greyhound pub, Village Street.

=== 2020-now ===
From March 2020 until 2023 he didn't compete in any darts event. In 2023, he took part in the MODUS Super Series.

== World Championship performances ==
=== PDC ===
- 2007: Quarter-Finals (lost to Andy Jenkins 4–5)
- 2008: 1st Round (lost to Erwin Extercatte 1–3)
- 2009: 2nd Round (lost to Vincent van der Voort 1–4)
- 2010: 1st Round (lost to Simon Whitlock 1–3)
- 2011: 3rd Round (lost to Raymond van Barneveld 3–4)
- 2012: 1st Round (lost to Michael van Gerwen 1–3)
- 2013: 2nd Round (lost to Simon Whitlock 0–4)
- 2014: 1st Round (lost to Brendan Dolan 0–3)

== Career finals ==
=== PDC major finals: 2 (1 title) ===
Legend
UK Open (0–1)
Championship League (1–0)

Outcome	No.	Year	Championship	Opponent in the final	Score (Note: (l) = score in legs, (s) = score in sets.)
Runner-up	1.	2009	UK Open	Phil Taylor	6–11 (l)
Winner	1.	2009	Championship League	Phil Taylor	6–4 (l)

== Performance timeline ==
Tournament	2005	2006	2007	2008	2009	2010	2011		2012	2013	2014
PDC World Championship	DNQ		QF	1R	2R	1R	3R		1R	2R	1R
UK Open	QF	3R	SF	4R	F	4R	5R		4R	2R	DNQ
World Matchplay	1R	DNQ	1R	2R	1R	1R	1R		1R	DNQ	
World Grand Prix	DNQ		1R	2R	1R	2R	DNQ		2R	DNQ	
European Championship	Not held			1R	2R	1R	Did not qualify				
Grand Slam of Darts	Not held		DNQ		RR	2R	Did not qualify				
Players Championship Finals	Not held				1R	SF	2R	1R	1R	DNQ	
Las Vegas Desert Classic	DNQ		2R	DNQ	1R	Not held					
Championship League Darts	Not held			RR	W	RR	RR		RR	RR	NH
US Open/WSoD	NH	DNQ	1R	5R	Not held						

Performance Table Legend
W	Won the tournament	F	Finalist	SF	Semifinalist	QF	Quarterfinalist	#R; RR; Prel.	Lost in # round Round-robin; Preliminary round	DQ	Disqualified
DNQ	Did not qualify	DNP	Did not participate	WD	Withdrew	NH	Tournament not held	#R; RR; Prel.	Lost in # round Round-robin; Preliminary round	NYF	Not yet founded
