= Andy Smith (darts player) =

English darts player (born 1967)

Personal information
- Nickname: "The Pie Man"
- Born: 22 June 1967 (age 59) Bromsgrove, England
- Home town: Studley, England

Sport
- Sport: Darts
- Playing since: 1974
- Darts: 20.5g Tungsten A180
- Laterality: Right-handed
- Walk-on music: "Eat It" by "Weird Al" Yankovic

Organisation (see split in darts)
- BDO: 1997–2004
- PDC: 2004–2018

WDF major events – best performances
- World Championship: Last 32: 1997, 1998, 2000, 2001
- World Masters: Last 64: 1999
- World Trophy: Last 32: 2002
- Int. Darts League: Last 32 group: 2003

PDC premier events – best performances
- World Championship: Last 16: 2006, 2011
- World Matchplay: Last 16: 2012
- World Grand Prix: Quarter-final: 2006, 2009, 2011
- UK Open: Last 16: 2009, 2010, 2011
- European Championship: Last 16: 2010
- Championship League: Initial groups, Semi-finals 2008
- Desert Classic: Last 32: 2005, 2006, 2007
- US Open/WSoD: Last 32: 2007, 2008
- PC Finals: Quarter-final: 2011

Other tournament wins
- Years
England Open	1997
Norway Open	2002
Redditch Open	2009
Welsh Open	1999
Players Championships
Players Championship (BAR)	2011
Players Championship (GER)	2009
Players Championship (HOL)	2010
Players Championship (SCO)	2007
UK Open Regionals
Regional Final (SCO)	2004
Regional Final (SWE)	2005

Other achievements
- 2009 Nine dart finish at PDPA Players Championship Germany.

Andrew Smith (born 22 June 1967) is an English former professional darts player. He used the nickname the Pie Man for his matches. His best performances came in the "floor" events (non-televised tournaments with many boards being used simultaneously), where he won six PDC Pro Tour titles.

== Career ==
A former England international, Smith won the England, Welsh and Norway Opens in his early career, as well as qualifying for the British Darts Organisation version of the world championship on four occasions (losing in the first round each time), before switching from the BDO to the PDC. His wins in the Scottish and South-West Regional Finals for the 2005 UK Open saw him enter the televised finals as number one seed, and he later qualified for the Las Vegas Desert Classic.

Smith narrowly missed out on an automatic place in the 2006 PDC World Championship after jumping to 33rd in the rankings, but came through the PDPA qualifiers to book his place at the Circus Tavern. He overcame Colin Monk and Ray Carver to reach the last 16, before losing out to Alan Warriner-Little.

Smith did not win another Pro Tour title until October 2007, when he took the PDPA Scottish Players Championship in Irvine – beating James Wade with a 108 average in the final. He won a Players Championship in Dinslaken, Germany in June 2009, hitting a nine-dart finish in his quarter final before defeating Colin Lloyd to take the title.

Smith suffered three successive first round defeats in the PDC World Championship, losing to Mensur Suljović in 2008, Tony Ayres in 2009, and Darin Young in 2010. He broke this trend in the 2011 PDC World Darts Championship when he beat Shane Tichowitsch 3–1, and reached the last-16 for the second time in his career with a 4–3 win over Mervyn King, which included Smith hitting seven 100+ out-shots.

In June, Smith won the Bobby Bourn Memorial Players Championship beating Dave Chisnall 6–2 earning himself £6000. On his way to the final he narrowly beat Wayne Atwood 6–5 before he beat James Richardson also 6–5. He then picked up his form to beat Alan Tabern 6–3 which meant he faced Andy Hamilton 6–2. in the quarter-finals he beat Gary Anderson 6–1 setting up a semi-final clash with the in-form James Wade whom he beat 6–3 before prevailing in the final against Dave Chisnall hitting two 12 darters and two thirteen darters to seal the win.

At the 2012 World Championship Smith played Scott Rand in the first round and was beaten 0–3, without winning a leg. At the UK Open, Smith beat Rand 9–6 and came back from 4–8 down in the last 32 to force a decider against Dennis Priestley which he lost. In July, Smith won his first ever match in seven attempts at the World Matchplay following a 10–6 victory over Paul Nicholson. He faced Adrian Lewis in the last 16 and was beaten 7–13. After all 33 ProTour events of 2012 had been played, Smith was 19th on the Order of Merit, comfortably inside the top 32 who qualified for the Players Championship Finals. He was beaten 2–6 by Andy Hamilton in the first round.

Smith lost in the first round of the 2013 World Championship to qualifier Daryl Gurney 3–1, hitting just 15% of his darts at a double during the match. He beat James Hubbard 5–3 in the second round of the UK Open, before losing 9–7 to Gary Anderson. Smith's deepest run of the year was at the fourth Players Championship where he lost 6–4 to Jelle Klaasen in the semi-finals.

Smith overcame Steve Brown 3–1 in the opening round of the 2014 World Championship but then let a 3–0 set lead slip against James Wade in the second round to lose 4–3, missing two darts for the match in the process. He suffered a heavy 9–3 loss to Gary Anderson in the third round of the UK Open. Smith defeated Kevin Dowling 6–3 and Anderson and Ronnie Baxter both 6–2 at the Austrian Darts Open to play in his sole quarter-final of 2014. He lost to home favourite Mensur Suljović 6–2. He was knocked out of the World Matchplay and World Grand Prix by Wade. At the Players Championship Finals, Smith beat Michael Smith 6–4, before Adrian Lewis won 10–3 in the second round.

Smith lost the first two sets of his first round match against Ronny Huybrechts at the 2015 World Championship without winning a leg. He went two nil up in legs in the next set but missed a total of five darts for it to be beaten 3–0. He was unable to get past the last 16 of any event in 2015 and dropped out of the top 32 on the Order of Merit during the year, which meant he failed to qualify for the World Championship for the first time since the 2005 event. He lost 6–5 in the first round of the 2016 UK Open to Jermaine Wattimena. Throughout 2016 he failed to progress beyond the last 32 of a single tournament. He was the world number 74 after the 2017 World Championship and entered Q School to try and win his place on the tour back. One last 64 finish during the four days of play was not enough to do so, and Smith only had a limited selection of events to enter in 2017.

== World Championship results ==
=== BDO ===
- 1997: First round (lost to Geoff Wylie 2–3)
- 1998: First round (lost to Les Wallace 2–3)
- 2000: First round (lost to Co Stompé 2–3)
- 2001: First round (lost to Co Stompé 1–3)

=== PDC ===
- 2006: Third round (lost to Alan Warriner-Little 2–4)
- 2007: Second round (lost to Andy Jenkins 2–4)
- 2008: First round (lost to Mensur Suljović 2–3)
- 2009: First round (lost to Tony Ayres 2–3)
- 2010: First round (lost to Darin Young 2–3)
- 2011: Third round (lost to Gary Anderson 0–4)
- 2012: First round (lost to Scott Rand 0–3)
- 2013: First round (lost to Daryl Gurney 1–3)
- 2014: Second round (lost to James Wade 3–4)
- 2015: First round (lost to Ronny Huybrechts 1–3)

== Career statistics ==
Key
W	F	SF	QF	#R	RR	Prel.	DNQ	DNP	NH

(W) Won; (F) finalist; (SF) semifinalist; (QF) quarterfinalist; (#R) rounds 6, 5, 4, 3, 2, 1; (RR) round-robin stage; (Prel.) Preliminary round; (DNQ) Did not qualify; (DNP) Did not participate; (NH) Not held

=== Performance timeline ===
Tournament	1994	1995	1996	1997	1998	1999	2000	2001	2002	2003	2004	2005	2006	2007	2008	2009	2010	2011		2012	2013	2014	2015	2016
BDO World Championship	DNQ			1R	1R	DNQ	1R	1R	DNQ		No longer a BDO Member													
World Masters	1R	DNQ		2R	Prel.	2R	DNQ		1R	No longer a BDO Member														
World Darts Trophy	Not held								1R	DNP				Prel.	Not held									
International Darts League	Not held									RR	DNP				Not held									
PDC World Championship	Non-PDC										DNQ		3R	2R	1R	1R	1R	3R		1R	1R	2R	1R	DNQ
UK Open	Not held									2R	DNQ	5R	4R	5R	3R	5R	5R	5R		4R	3R	3R	2R	1R
World Matchplay	Non-PDC										DNQ		1R	1R	1R	1R	1R	1R		2R	1R	1R	DNQ	
World Grand Prix	Not held				Non-PDC						DNQ		QF	2R	1R	QF	2R	QF		1R	1R	1R	DNQ	
European Championship	Not held														DNQ	1R	2R	1R		1R	DNQ			
Players Championship Finals	Not held															2R	1R	QF	1R	1R	1R	2R	DNQ	
Las Vegas Desert Classic	Not held								Non-PDC		DNQ	1R	1R	1R	DNQ		Not held							
Career statistics
Year-end ranking	Non-PDC										-	-	21	22	26	27	27	20		21	27	28	36	67
