= Mark Frost (darts player) =

English darts player

Personal information
- Nickname: Frosty The Throw Man
- Born: 23 October 1971 (age 54) Stoke-on-Trent, England
- Home town: Stoke-on-Trent, England

Sport
- Sport: Darts
- Playing since: 1987
- Darts: 26 Grams
- Laterality: Right-handed
- Walk-on music: "The Final Countdown" by Europe

Organisation (see split in darts)
- PDC: 1997–2001, 2004–2014

WDF major events – best performances
- World Masters: Last 64: 2004

PDC premier events – best performances
- World Championship: Last 64: 2017
- World Matchplay: Last 32: 2008
- UK Open: Last 32: 2009

Other tournament wins
- Years
Carmarthen Open	1997
Fenton KO	2010
Midlands Open	1997, 1998
PDC Challenge Tour England	2014 (x3)
PDC Challenge Tour OOM winner 2014

Mark Frost (born 23 October 1971) is an English former professional darts player from Stoke-on-Trent. He played in Professional Darts Corporation (PDC) events and used the nickname Frosty The Throw Man for his matches.

== Career ==
Frost made his televised debut at the 2008 Stan James World Matchplay, where he qualified through the PDC Pro Tour order of merit. He faced Raymond van Barneveld in the first round. He led 9–8, before eventually losing in a tie-break 11–9 to the five-time World Champion.

Frost lost 3 sets to 0 against Gary Anderson in the first round of the 2017 PDC World Darts Championship in his debut in the competition.

== World Championship results ==
=== PDC ===
- 2017: First round (lost to Gary Anderson 0–3)
