= 2010 UK Open Qualifiers =

Darts tournament

Tournament information
- Dates: 21 February – 9 May
- Country: England
- Organisation(s): PDC
- Format: Best of 11 legs
- Prize fund: £31,200
- Winner's share: £6,000

The 2010 UK Open Qualifiers were a series of eight dart tournaments organised by the Professional Darts Corporation. Along with 37 Players Championship events, they comprised the 2010 PDC Pro Tour. The tournaments qualified 96 players to the 2010 UK Open.

== Prize money ==
Each of the eight qualifiers had a prize fund of £31,200 with a £6,000 winner's share, matching the UK Pro Tour events. Cumulative earnings formed the UK Open Order of Merit.

Stage	Prize money (Total-£31,200)
Winner	£6,000
Runner Up	£3,000
Semi Final	£1,500
Quarter Final	£1,000
Fourth Round	£500
Third Round	£300
Second Round	£200
First Round	£0
Preliminary Round	£0

=== Order of Merit ===
The UK Open Order of Merit was formed by adding the earnings of all players that played more than three of the qualifying events. The top 32 on order of merit received byes into the third round, with the rest of the top 64 receiving byes into the second round, and the remaining players entering in the first and preliminary rounds alongside the Amateur and BDO qualifying players.

Top 32, byes into third round
Rank	Player	Events	Earnings
1	Mark Walsh	8	£15,200
2	Phil Taylor	3	£15,000
3	Gary Anderson	8	£13,500
4	James Wade	7	£10,900
5	Colin Lloyd	8	£7,700
6	Mervyn King	6	£7,200
7	Jamie Caven	8	£6,900
8	Wes Newton	8	£6,500
9	John Part	8	£6,300
10	Colin Osborne	7	£5,900
11	Andy Hamilton	8	£5,100
12	Simon Whitlock	8	£4,900
13	Vincent van der Voort	8	£4,700
14	Wayne Jones	8	£4,600
15	Mark Webster	8	£4,500
16	Peter Wright	8	£4,400
17	Jelle Klaasen	8	£4,400
18	Kevin Painter	8	£3,900
19	Co Stompé	7	£3,600
20	Adrian Lewis	8	£3,400
21	Michael van Gerwen	8	£3,200
22	Mark Dudbridge	8	£3,200
23	Alan Tabern	8	£3,000
24	Steve Maish	8	£2,900
25	Brendan Dolan	8	£2,900
26	Terry Jenkins	7	£2,900
27	Dennis Priestley	6	£2,800
28	Matt Clark	8	£2,800
29	Ronnie Baxter	8	£2,700
30	Denis Ovens	8	£2,500
31	Tony Eccles	8	£2,300
32	Nigel Heydon	8	£2,300

33–64, byes into second round
Rank	Player	Events	Earnings
33	Andy Smith	8	£2,300
34	Paul Nicholson	8	£2,300
35	Chris Thompson	8	£2,200
36	Mark Frost	8	£2,200
37	Justin Pipe	8	£2,200
38	Mark Lawrence	8	£2,200
39	Nick Fullwell	8	£2,000
40	Colin Monk	8	£2,000
41	Steve Beaton	8	£1,900
42	Barrie Bates	8	£1,900
43	Darren Johnson	8	£1,900
44	Dennis Smith	8	£1,800
45	Adrian Gray	8	£1,700
46	Robert Thornton	8	£1,600
47	Chris Mason	8	£1,600
48	Roland Scholten	6	£1,600
49	Steve Evans	8	£1,500
50	Steve Brown	8	£1,400
51	Mark Cox	8	£1,400
52	Michael Barnard	8	£1,400
53	Wayne Mardle	7	£1,400
54	Mick McGowan	8	£1,300
55	Kirk Shepherd	8	£1,300
56	Arron Monk	8	£1,300
57	Michael Smith	5	£1,200
58	Kevin McDine	7	£1,200
59	Stephen Hardy	8	£1,100
60	Peter Manley	5	£1,100
61	Wayne Atwood	6	£1,000
62	Tony Ayres	7	£1,000
63	Alex Roy	8	£1,000
64	Stuart Dutton	6	£1,000

65–96, first and preliminary rounds
Rank	Player	Events	Earnings
65	Steve Farmer	7	£900
66	Gary Mawson	6	£900
67	Kevin Dowling	8	£800
68	Steve Hine	8	£800
69	Peter Hudson	8	£800
70	Dave Smith	7	£700
71	Simon Cunningham	4	£700
72	John Quantock	6	£700
73	Jyhan Artut	3	£700
74	Joe Cullen	7	£700
75	Mark Stephenson	8	£600
76	Matt Padgett	8	£600
77	Dave Honey	8	£600
78	Gary Eastwood	6	£600
79	Darren Webster	8	£600
80	Louis Blundell	8	£600
81	Dylan Duo	5	£600
82	Jason Clark	6	£500
83	William O'Connor	4	£500
84	Scott Rand	3	£500
85	Par Riihonen	8	£500
86	Sam Allen	8	£500
87	Anton Liscsey	6	£500
88	Danny Pinhorne	8	£400
89	Paul Rowley	8	£400
90	Martyn Turner	7	£400
91	Darren Latham	7	£400
92	Robbie Newland	8	£400
93	Richie Burnett	8	£400
94	Matt Draper	7	£400
95	Chris Loudon	8	£400
96	Andy Hutchings	8	£400

=== Amateur and BDO qualifying players ===
32 amateur players also qualified from Rileys qualifiers held in Rileys Dart Zones across Britain.

- Melvyn Johnston
- Paul Gibbs
- Tony Broughton
- Dean Edlin
- Michael Hammond
- Darren Sullivan
- Ricky Evans
- Alex Harrison
- David Martin
- John Bowles
- Noel Grant
- Henry Murphy
- Paul Neate
- John Robertson
- Ryan Murray
- John Lakeman
- Barrie Knight
- Mark Wilson
- Reece Robinson
- Bradley Williams
- Jamie Green
- Ashley Whisker
- Paul Warwick
- Paul Whitworth
- Stuart Monaghan
- Barrie Webb
- Joe Palmer
- Pete Fisher
- Simon Jones
- Dean Stewart
- Nicky Bache
- Dean Harris

A final 10 players qualified as BDO representatives from Avon, Bedfordshire, East Stirlingshire, Gloucestershire, Hampshire, Lothian, Northumberland, Nottinghamshire, Surrey, Warwickshire.

- Mike Nott
- Kevin Lowe
- Andy Murray
- Henry O'Neill
- Tony Hutchinson
- Hugh Ringland
- Ian Gleeson
- Jay Foreman
- Mark Harris
- Prakash Jiwa

== Qualifier 1 ==
The 2010 UK Open Qualifier 1 was held at the Oasis Leisure Centre in Swindon on Sunday 21 February.

Second Round
Mark Frost	6
Michael Barnard	5
Colin Lloyd	4
Anton Liscsey	6
Kevin Painter	2
James Wade	6
John Part	2
Nigel Heydon	6
Wes Newton	4
Mark Lawrence	6
Darren Johnson	6
Brendan Dolan	5
Wayne Mardle	4
Roland Scholten	6
Nick Fullwell	6
Mick McGowan	2
Mark Dudbridge	4
Jamie Caven	6
Pete Hudson	6
Andy Hutchings	5
Mark Walsh	1
Ronnie Baxter	6
Peter Wright	3
Mervyn King	6
Michael van Gerwen	6
Steve Maish	2
Co Stompé	5
Wayne Jones	6
Kirk Shepherd	3
Colin Monk	6
Arron Monk	6
Steve Beaton	4
Par Riihonen	3
Alex Roy	6
Jelle Klaasen	4
Chris Mason	6
Denis Ovens	3
Terry Jenkins	6
John Quantock	0
Dennis Smith	6
Louis Blundell	3
Colin Osborne	6
Chris Thompson	3
Simon Whitlock	6
Richie Burnett	4
Paul Nicholson	6
Andy Smith	6
Matt Draper	1
Tony Ayres	0
Peter Manley	6
Simon Cunningham	4
Gary Anderson	6
Dave Honey	2
Robert Thornton	3
Alan Tabern	2
Vincent van der Voort	6
Barrie Bates	6
Adrian Gray	2
Adrian Lewis	6
Jyhan Artut	4
Mark Webster	6
Justin Pipe	1
Dylan Duo	5
Matt Clark	6

Third round
Mark Frost	3
Anton Liscsey	6
James Wade	6
Nigel Heydon	5
Mark Lawrence	6
Darren Johnson	4
Roland Scholten	6
Nick Fullwell	4
Jamie Caven	6
Pete Hudson	5
Ronnie Baxter	3
Mervyn King	6
Michael van Gerwen	3
Wayne Jones	6
Colin Monk	5
Arron Monk	6
Alex Roy	3
Chris Mason	6
Terry Jenkins	6
Dennis Smith	1
Colin Osborne	0
Simon Whitlock	6
Paul Nicholson	6
Andy Smith	4
Peter Manley	4
Gary Anderson	6
Robert Thornton	6
Vincent van der Voort	4
Barrie Bates	2
Adrian Lewis	6
Mark Webster	5
Matt Clark	6

Fourth round
Anton Liscsey	4
James Wade	6
Mark Lawrence	6
Roland Scholten	4
Jamie Caven	3
Mervyn King	6
Wayne Jones	6
Arron Monk	4
Chris Mason	2
Terry Jenkins	6
Simon Whitlock	6
Paul Nicholson	3
Gary Anderson	6
Robert Thornton	2
Adrian Lewis	2
Matt Clark	6

Quarter-finals
James Wade	6
Mark Lawrence	3
Mervyn King	6
Wayne Jones	3
Terry Jenkins	5
Simon Whitlock	6
Gary Anderson	6
Matt Clark	3

Semi-finals
James Wade	4
Mervyn King	6
Simon Whitlock	6
Gary Anderson	5

Final
Mervyn King	6
Simon Whitlock	1

== Qualifier 2 ==
The 2010 UK Open Qualifier 2 was held at the Moorways Centre in Derby on Sunday 28 February.

Second Round
Stuart Dutton	6
Mervyn King	2
Wayne Atwood	6
Matt Padgett	3
Adrian Lewis	6
Steve Hine	2
Mark Frost	6
Joe Cullen	3
Darren Webster	6
Steve Beaton	5
Andy Hamilton	6
Ronnie Baxter	4
Mark Lawrence	1
Gary Anderson	6
Michael van Gerwen	5
Steve Hardy	6
Mark Dudbridge	5
Vincent van der Voort	6
Tony Eccles	6
Peter Wright	5
John Part	5
Jelle Klaasen	6
Mark Cox	6
Lee Hayes	3
Michael Barnard	4
Kevin Painter	6
Phil Taylor	6
Andy Callaby	3
Pete Edmonds	2
Terry Jenkins	6
Nick Fullwell	6
Robbie Newland	3
Co Stompé	6
Darren Latham	3
Wes Newton	6
Steve Maish	3
Steve Brown	2
Peter Manley	6
Jamie Caven	6
Wayne Jones	2
James Wade	6
Wayne Mardle	0
Kevin McDine	2
Andy Smith	6
Arron Monk	6
Dave Ladley	4
Steve Evans	1
Paul Nicholson	6
Chris Thompson	6
Alan Tabern	3
Dylan Duo	2
Jyhan Artut	6
Barrie Bates	2
Colin Monk	6
Brendan Dolan	6
Denis Ovens	5
Colin Lloyd	2
Mark Walsh	6
Roland Scholten	4
Mark Webster	6
Dennis Priestley	6
Chris Mason	4
Chris Loudon	2
Pete Hudson	6

Third round
Stuart Dutton	6
Wayne Atwood	2
Adrian Lewis	6
Mark Frost	3
Darren Webster	3
Andy Hamilton	6
Gary Anderson	6
Steve Hardy	4
Vincent van der Voort	6
Tony Eccles	3
Jelle Klaasen	6
Mark Cox	1
Kevin Painter	1
Phil Taylor	6
Terry Jenkins	4
Nick Fullwell	6
Co Stompé	6
Wes Newton	2
Peter Manley	1
Jamie Caven	6
James Wade	6
Andy Smith	3
Arron Monk	1
Paul Nicholson	6
Chris Thompson	6
Jyhan Artut	3
Colin Monk	6
Brendan Dolan	4
Mark Walsh	6
Mark Webster	4
Dennis Priestley	6
Pete Hudson	1

Fourth round
Stuart Dutton	5
Adrian Lewis	6
Andy Hamilton	6
Gary Anderson	1
Vincent van der Voort	2
Jelle Klaasen	6
Phil Taylor	6
Nick Fullwell	1
Co Stompé	6
Jamie Caven	2
James Wade	6
Paul Nicholson	2
Chris Thompson	3
Colin Monk	6
Mark Walsh	6
Dennis Priestley	5

Quarter-finals
Adrian Lewis	4
Andy Hamilton	6
Jelle Klaasen	1
Phil Taylor	6
Co Stompé	6
James Wade	1
Colin Monk	6
Mark Walsh	6

Semi-finals
Andy Hamilton	1
Phil Taylor	6
Co Stompé	4
Mark Walsh	6

Final
Phil Taylor	2
Mark Walsh	6

== Qualifier 3 ==
The 2010 UK Open Qualifier 3 was held at the Robin Park Tennis Centre in Wigan on Sunday 14 March.

Second Round
Colin Monk	5
Kevin Painter	6
Steve Farmer	6
Brendan Dolan	3
Adrian Gray	6
Steve Hine	3
Tony Eccles	2
Joe Cullen	6
Ronnie Baxter	4
Wes Newton	6
Dave Smith	5
Alan Tabern	6
Colin Osborne	6
Mareno Michels	3
Simon Whitlock	3
Justin Pipe	6
Nigel Heydon	6
Colin Lloyd	4
Kevin Dowling	5
Jelle Klaasen	6
John Quantock	6
Steve Hardy	4
Jamie Atkins	0
Vincent van der Voort	6
Mick McGowan	4
Darren Johnson	6
Michael Smith	6
Dean Allsop	3
Sam Allen	6
Dennis Smith	1
James Wade	1
Phil Taylor	6
John Part	6
Nigel Birch	4
Nick Fullwell	6
Mark Cox	5
Mark Lawrence	6
Co Stompé	4
Terry Jenkins	6
Steve Evans	1
Adrian Lewis	6
Peter Wright	2
Mark Frost	6
Steve Beaton	3
Mark Dudbridge	6
Michael van Gerwen	4
Andy Smith	2
Matt Clark	6
Steve Maish	6
Kirk Shepherd	3
Mark Webster	6
Michael Barnard	1
Wayne Mardle	6
Chris Mason	1
Jamie Caven	6
Wayne Jones	2
Andy Hutchings	2
Andy Hamilton	6
Barrie Bates	4
Tony Randell	6
Robert Thornton	3
Gary Anderson	6
Gary Mawson	5
Roland Scholten	6

Third round
Kevin Painter	6
Steve Farmer	3
Adrian Gray	2
Joe Cullen	6
Wes Newton	5
Alan Tabern	6
Colin Osborne	6
Justin Pipe	2
Nigel Heydon	2
Jelle Klaasen	6
John Quantock	2
Vincent van der Voort	6
Darren Johnson	5
Michael Smith	6
Sam Allen	0
Phil Taylor	6
John Part	6
Nick Fullwell	2
Mark Lawrence	1
Terry Jenkins	6
Adrian Lewis	6
Mark Frost	4
Mark Dudbridge	6
Matt Clark	4
Steve Maish	5
Mark Webster	6
Wayne Mardle	3
Jamie Caven	6
Andy Hamilton	6
Tony Randell	1
Gary Anderson	6
Roland Scholten	4

Fourth round
Kevin Painter	6
Joe Cullen	5
Alan Tabern	5
Colin Osborne	6
Jelle Klaasen	6
Vincent van der Voort	4
Michael Smith	0
Phil Taylor	6
John Part	6
Terry Jenkins	4
Adrian Lewis	2
Mark Dudbridge	6
Mark Webster	2
Jamie Caven	6
Andy Hamilton	2
Gary Anderson	6

Quarter-finals
Kevin Painter	5
Colin Osborne	6
Jelle Klaasen	2
Phil Taylor	6
John Part	5
Mark Dudbridge	6
Jamie Caven	6
Gary Anderson	3

Semi-finals
Colin Osborne	2
Phil Taylor	6
Mark Dudbridge	3
Jamie Caven	6

Final
Phil Taylor	6
Jamie Caven	0

== Qualifier 4 ==
The 2010 UK Open Qualifier 4 was held at the K2 Centre in Crawley on Sunday 21 March.

Second Round
Aodhagen O Neill	6
Louis Blundell	3
Wes Newton	6
Alex Roy	3
Darren Johnson	6
Alan Tabern	3
Vincent van der Voort	2
Steve Maish	6
Justin Pipe	6
Nick Fullwell	5
Gary Eastwood	6
Adrian Lewis	3
Colin Osborne	6
Steve Grubb	4
Toon Greebe	1
Denis Ovens	6
Mervyn King	2
Jelle Klaasen	6
Jamie Caven	6
Simon Whitlock	1
Ian McFarlane	3
Nigel Heydon	6
Wayne Jones	6
Mark Walsh	5
Martyn Turner	4
Tony Ayres	6
Didier de Vuyst	4
James Wade	6
Peter Wright	5
Adrian Gray	6
Andy Smith	6
Simon Cunningham	4
Gary Anderson	6
Kevin Painter	2
Matt Clark	6
Kirk Shepherd	1
Colin Monk	6
Chris Loudon	5
Colin Lloyd	6
Michael Barnard	1
Mark Dudbridge	4
Kevin McDine	6
Gary Mawson	4
Co Stompé	6
John Part	1
Peter Manley	6
Raymond van Barneveld	6
Robert Thornton	2
Tony Eccles	5
Michael van Gerwen	6
Andy Hamilton	6
Dennis Smith	4
Steve Hardy	6
Chris Thompson	4
Mark Lawrence	6
Ronnie Baxter	4
Wayne Atwood	6
Steve Evans	3
Paul Nicholson	6
Steve Brown	3
Mark Webster	6
Mark Frost	5
Brendan Dolan	6
Wayne Mardle	5

Third round
Aodhagen O Neill	4
Wes Newton	6
Darren Johnson	3
Steve Maish	6
Justin Pipe	6
Gary Eastwood	2
Colin Osborne	5
Denis Ovens	6
Jelle Klaasen	6
Jamie Caven	3
Nigel Heydon	6
Wayne Jones	5
Tony Ayres	2
James Wade	6
Adrian Gray	5
Andy Smith	6
Gary Anderson	6
Matt Clark	1
Colin Monk	4
Colin Lloyd	6
Kevin McDine	6
Co Stompé	5
Peter Manley	2
Raymond van Barneveld	6
Michael van Gerwen	5
Andy Hamilton	6
Steve Hardy	2
Mark Lawrence	6
Wayne Atwood	1
Paul Nicholson	6
Mark Webster	2
Brendan Dolan	6

Fourth round
Wes Newton	6
Steve Maish	3
Justin Pipe	6
Denis Ovens	1
Jelle Klaasen	6
Nigel Heydon	5
James Wade	6
Andy Smith	3
Gary Anderson	6
Colin Lloyd	1
Kevin McDine	5
Raymond van Barneveld	6
Andy Hamilton	6
Mark Lawrence	4
Paul Nichcolson	2
Brendan Dolan	6

Quarter-finals
Wes Newton	6
Justin Pipe	2
Jelle Klaasen	1
James Wade	6
Gary Anderson	6
Raymond van Barneveld	2
Andy Hamilton	6
Brendan Dolan	2

Semi-finals
Wes Newton	6
James Wade	5
Gary Anderson	6
Andy Hamilton	5

Final
Wes Newton	5
Gary Anderson	6

== Qualifier 5 ==
UK Open Qualifier 5

Tournament information
- Dates: Sunday 11 April
- Venue: Metrodome
- Location: Barnsley

Champion(s)
- Mark Walsh

The 2010 UK Open Qualifier 5 was the fifth of eight 2010 UK Open Darts Qualifiers which was held at the Barnsley Metrodome on Sunday 11 April.

Second Round
Adrian Lewis	6
Andy Hamilton	5
Jelle Klaasen	6
Steve Beaton	4
Michael Barnard	3
Denis Ovens	6
Gary Mawson	1
Steve Farmer	6
Tony Ayres	2
Terry Jenkins	6
Arron Monk	6
Steve Musson	0
Matt Clark	4
Wayne Jones	6
James Barton	6
Dave Honey	3
Stuart Bousfield	6
Steve Brown	3
Mark Walsh	6
Colin Lloyd	3
Adrian Gray	0
Colin Osborne	6
Robert Thornton	1
Mervyn King	6
Mark Frost	2
Co Stompé	6
Matt Padgett	4
Paul Nicholson	6
Mick McGowan	3
Kevin McDine	6
Ronnie Baxter	6
Robert Parker	1
Mark Webster	6
Wayne Mardle	3
Alan Tabern	2
Gary Anderson	6
John Part	6
Darren Latham	1
Chris Thompson	6
Steve Evans	5
Nick Fullwell	4
Jason Clark	6
Robbie Newland	1
Mark Cox	6
Chris Mason	2
Vincent van der Voort	6
Darren Johnson	6
Dave Smith	5
Mark Dudbridge	5
Simon Whitlock	6
Peter Wright	3
Jamie Caven	6
Dennis Smith	2
Kevin Painter	6
Brian Startin	2
Michael van Gerwen	6
Mark Jodrill	5
Kirk Shepherd	6
Barrie Bates	5
Steve Maish	6
Wes Newton	6
Steve Hine	3
Kevin Dowling	6
Mark Stephenson	5

Third round
Adrian Lewis	6
Jelle Klaasen	3
Denis Ovens	6
Steve Farmer	5
Terry Jenkins	3
Arron Monk	6
Wayne Jones	6
James Barton	3
Stuart Bousfield	2
Mark Walsh	6
Colin Osborne	3
Mervyn King	6
Co Stompé	6
Paul Nicholson	4
Kevin McDine	5
Ronnie Baxter	6
Mark Webster	4
Gary Anderson	6
John Part	6
Chris Thompson	1
Jason Clark	2
Mark Cox	6
Vincent van der Voort	6
Darren Johnson	4
Simon Whitlock	3
Jamie Caven	6
Kevin Painter	5
Michael van Gerwen	6
Kirk Shepherd	4
Steve Maish	6
Wes Newton	6
Kevin Dowling	1

Fourth round
Adrian Lewis	2
Denis Ovens	6
Arron Monk	2
Wayne Jones	6
Mark Walsh	6
Mervyn King	5
Co Stompé	6
Ronnie Baxter	2
Gary Anderson	3
John Part	6
Mark Cox	3
Vincent van der Voort	6
Jamie Caven	6
Michael van Gerwen	3
Steve Maish	2
Wes Newton	6

Quarter-finals
Denis Ovens	4
Wayne Jones	6
Mark Walsh	6
Co Stompé	5
John Part	6
Vincent van der Voort	4
Jamie Caven	6
Wes Newton	3

Semi-finals
Wayne Jones	5
Mark Walsh	6
John Part	6
Jamie Caven	3

Final
Mark Walsh	6
John Part	3

== Qualifier 6 ==
The 2010 UK Open Qualifier 6 was held at the Moorways Centre in Derby on Sunday 18 April.

Second Round
Mick McGowan	1
Phil Taylor	6
Mark Frost	6
Jimmy Mann	1
Mark Dudbridge	4
Gary Eastwood	6
James Wade	6
Stuart Dutton	2
Steve Evans	6
Terry Jenkins	3
Mark Webster	6
Nigel Heydon	3
Colin Lloyd	4
Steve Brown	6
Alan Tabern	6
Martyn Turner	5
William O'Connor	6
Alex Roy	2
Paul Nicholson	2
Vincent van der Voort	6
Barrie Bates	6
Dennis Smith	4
Par Riihonen	6
Pete Hudson	2
Mark Walsh	6
Mensur Suljović	3
Dennis Priestley	6
Denis Ovens	3
Simon Whitlock	3
Andy Hamilton	6
Colin Osborne	6
Kirk Shepherd	1
Steve Hardy	6
Mark Stephenson	4
Wayne Jones	3
Peter Wright	6
Adrian Lewis	6
Steven Pearson	2
Brendan Dolan	3
Steve Beaton	6
Andy Smith	6
Colin Monk	4
Matt Clark	6
Sam Allen	5
Jamie Caven	6
Robert Thornton	3
Jason Clark	4
Tony Eccles	6
Steve Maish	6
Darren Johnson	2
Paul Rowley	1
Chris Thompson	6
Danny Pinhorne	2
John Part	6
Roland Scholten	3
Adrian Gray	6
Kevin Painter	6
Michael Smith	2
Jelle Klaasen	6
Justin Pipe	5
Dave Askew	3
Gary Mawson	6
Wes Newton	2
Gary Anderson	6

Third round
Phil Taylor	6
Mark Frost	1
Gary Eastwood	4
James Wade	6
Steve Evans	5
Mark Webster	6
Steve Brown	1
Alan Tabern	6
William O'Connor	4
Vincent van der Voort	6
Barrie Bates	6
Par Riihonen	1
Mark Walsh	4
Dennis Priestley	6
Andy Hamilton	6
Colin Osborne	2
Steve Hardy	5
Peter Wright	6
Adrian Lewis	6
Steve Beaton	5
Andy Smith	5
Matt Clark	6
Jamie Caven	4
Tony Eccles	6
Steve Maish	6
Chris Thompson	2
John Part	6
Adrian Gray	5
Kevin Painter	6
Jelle Klaasen	3
Gary Mawson	2
Gary Anderson	6

Fourth round
Phil Taylor	6
James Wade	4
Mark Webster	6
Alan Tabern	3
Vincent van der Voort	6
Barrie Bates	2
Dennis Priestley	3
Andy Hamilton	6
Peter Wright	6
Adrian Lewis	3
Matt Clark	2
Tony Eccles	6
Steve Maish	6
John Part	5
Kevin Painter	6
Gary Anderson	2

Quarter-finals
Phil Taylor	6
Mark Webster	2
Vincent van der Voort	6
Andy Hamilton	5
Peter Wright	6
Tony Eccles	4
Steve Maish	4
Kevin Painter	6

Semi-finals
Phil Taylor	6
Vincent van der Voort	3
Peter Wright	6
Kevin Painter	4

Final
Phil Taylor	6
Peter Wright	2

== Qualifier 7 ==
The 2010 UK Open Qualifier 7 was held at the Robin Park Tennis Centre in Wigan on Sunday 25 April.

Second Round
Ron Atwill	5
Alex Roy	6
Vincent van der Voort	2
Mark Walsh	6
Mark Dudbridge	6
Mark Stephenson	4
Scott Rand	6
Danny Pinhorne	3
Richie Burnett	4
Robert Thornton	6
Gary Anderson	6
Kevin Painter	3
Terry Jenkins	6
Steve Hine	5
Wes Newton	6
Dennis Smith	0
Adrian Gray	2
Dave Smith	6
Wayne Atwood	3
Justin Pipe	6
Kevin McDine	3
Wayne Jones	6
Darren Weaver	6
Dylan Duo	3
Colin Lloyd	6
Alan Tabern	2
Wayne Mardle	6
William O'Connor	5
Tony Ayres	6
Ian Lever	1
Chris Mason	0
Chris Thompson	6
Michael van Gerwen	2
Dennis Priestley	6
Jelle Klaasen	6
Lee Williams	4
Michael Barnard	5
Steve Brown	6
Matt Draper	2
Mark Frost	6
John Part	6
Steve Evans	1
Tony Eccles	6
Andy Smith	4
Nick Fullwell	6
Denis Ovens	0
Jamie Caven	6
Andy Hamilton	3
Co Stompé	2
Mark Webster	6
Louis Blundell	2
Simon Whitlock	6
Roland Scholten	4
Barrie Bates	6
Colin Osborne	6
Mick McGowan	4
Peter Wright	3
Steve Beaton	6
Steve Maish	1
Darren Webster	6
Stuart Dutton	6
James Wade	5
Ronnie Baxter	6
Mark Cox	2

Third round
Alex Roy	1
Mark Walsh	6
Mark Dudbridge	6
Scott Rand	4
Robert Thornton	3
Gary Anderson	6
Terry Jenkins	1
Wes Newton	6
Dave Smith	1
Justin Pipe	6
Wayne Jones	6
Darren Weaver	1
Colin Lloyd	6
Wayne Mardle	4
Tony Ayres	5
Chris Thompson	6
Dennis Priestley	6
Jelle Klaasen	4
Steve Brown	6
Mark Frost	3
John Part	6
Tony Eccles	3
Nick Fullwell	2
Jamie Caven	6
Mark Webster	0
Simon Whitlock	6
Barrie Bates	2
Colin Osborne	6
Steve Beaton	6
Darren Webster	4
Stuart Dutton	5
Ronnie Baxter	6

Fourth round
Mark Walsh	6
Mark Dudbridge	3
Gary Anderson	2
Wes Newton	6
Justin Pipe	3
Wayne Jones	6
Colin Lloyd	6
Chris Thompson	2
Dennis Priestley	6
Steve Brown	4
John Part	6
Jamie Caven	1
Simon Whitlock	5
Colin Osborne	6
Steve Beaton	4
Ronnie Baxter	6

Quarter-finals
Mark Walsh	6
Wes Newton	2
Wayne Jones	3
Colin Lloyd	6
Dennis Priestley	6
John Part	4
Colin Osborne	6
Ronnie Baxter	1

Semi-finals
Mark Walsh	3
Colin Lloyd	6
Dennis Priestley	4
Colin Osborne	6

Final
Colin Lloyd	6
Colin Osborne	3

== Qualifier 8 ==
The 2010 UK Open Qualifier 8 was held at the Robin Park Tennis Centre in Wigan on Sunday 9 May.

Second Round
Paul Rowley	5
Matt Clark	6
Lionel Sams	4
Ian Jopling	6
Nick Fullwell	3
Mark Webster	6
Adrian Gray	0
Mark Frost	6
Andy Jenkins	0
Nigel Heydon	6
Wayne Atwood	1
Steve Farmer	6
Wes Newton	6
Dave Honey	3
Jamie Caven	6
Mark Lawrence	5
Andy Hamilton	5
Gary Anderson	6
Scott Rand	3
Simon Cunningham	6
Dennis Priestley	6
Colin Osborne	3
Dennis Smith	6
Peter Manley	0
Alan Tabern	6
Colin Lloyd	3
Kevin Dowling	6
Jyhan Artut	5
Terry Jenkins	6
Wayne Jones	4
Adrian Lewis	3
Michael Smith	6
Jelle Klaasen	6
Steve Evans	5
Mark Walsh	6
Mark Cox	2
Co Stompé	5
Vincent van der Voort	6
John Quantock	4
Mervyn King	6
Denis Ovens	4
Simon Whitlock	6
Tony Eccles	6
Roland Scholten	2
John Part	3
Michael van Gerwen	6
Chris Mason	6
Ian White	5
Chris Thompson	2
Andy Smith	6
Mark Dudbridge	5
Ronnie Baxter	6
Paul Nicholson	6
Matt Padgett	1
Kevin Painter	5
Brendan Dolan	6
Barrie Bates	1
Steve Beaton	6
Kirk Shepherd	1
James Wade	6
Michael Barnard	3
Mick McGowan	6
Darren Johnson	6
Peter Wright	4

Third round
Matt Clark	6
Ian Jopling	5
Mark Webster	6
Mark Frost	1
Nigel Heydon	6
Steve Farmer	5
Wes Newton	6
Jamie Caven	4
Gary Anderson	6
Simon Cunningham	4
Dennis Priestley	4
Dennis Smith	6
Alan Tabern	6
Kevin Dowling	4
Terry Jenkins	5
Michael Smith	6
Jelle Klaasen	2
Mark Walsh	6
Vincent van der Voort	6
Mervyn King	4
Simon Whitlock	6
Tony Eccles	3
Michael van Gerwen	6
Chris Mason	1
Andy Smith	6
Ronnie Baxter	3
Paul Nicholson	3
Brendan Dolan	6
Steve Beaton	3
James Wade	6
Mick McGowan	1
Darren Johnson	6

Fourth round
Matt Clark	5
Mark Webster	6
Nigel Heydon	6
Wes Newton	5
Gary Anderson	6
Dennis Smith	5
Alan Tabern	6
Michael Smith	1
Mark Walsh	6
Vincent van der Voort	2
Simon Whitlock	3
Michael van Gerwen	6
Andy Smith	3
Brendan Dolan	6
James Wade	6
Darren Johnson	1

Quarter-finals
Mark Webster	6
Nigel Heydon	4
Gary Anderson	6
Alan Tabern	5
Mark Walsh	2
Michael van Gerwen	6
Brendan Dolan	3
James Wade	6

Semi-finals
Mark Webster	5
Gary Anderson	6
Michael van Gerwen	2
James Wade	6

Final
Gary Anderson	2
James Wade	6
