= 2010 PDC Pro Tour =

Series of darts tournaments

The 2010 PDC Pro Tour was a series of non-televised darts tournaments organised by the Professional Darts Corporation (PDC). They were Professional Dart Players Association (PDPA) Players Championships and UK Open Qualifiers. This year there were 45 PDC Pro Tour events – 37 Players Championships and 8 UK Open Qualifiers.

== Prize money ==
Prize money for each Players Championship (excluding Australia and Canada) and UK Open Qualifier increased from £29,600 in 2009 to £31,200 in 2010. Prize money for Australian and Canadian Players Championships remained unchanged at £21,600 per event.

Stage	UK/Europe/USA Events	Australia/Canada Events
Second round	£200	£100
Third round	£300	£200
Fourth round	£500	£300
Quarter-finals	£1,000	£700
Semi-finals	£1,500	£1,250
Final	£3,000	£2,500
Winner	£6,000	£5,000

In addition, £400 per Pro Tour event was reserved for a nine-dart finish. Should this not be won in an event, it would be carried over to the next event, and so on until a nine-dart finish is achieved. Once the prize fund is won, it reverted to £400 for the next event.

== Players Championships ==
(All matches – best of 11 legs)

=== Players Championship 1 ===
- Eddie Cox Memorial Players Championship 1 was contested at the Tercentenary Sports Hall, Gibraltar on 6 February.

Quarter-finals			Semi-finals			Final
17	(England) Andy Smith	2
8	(England) James Wade	6	8	(England) James Wade	5
29	(England) Mark Dudbridge	5	12	(England) Wayne Jones	6
12	(England) Wayne Jones	6				12	(England) Wayne Jones	2
2	(England) Colin Osborne	3				7	(England) Colin Lloyd	6
7	(England) Colin Lloyd	6	7	(England) Colin Lloyd	6
19	(England) Mervyn King	6	19	(England) Mervyn King	2
11	(England) Jamie Caven	4

=== Players Championship 2 ===
- PDPA Players Championship 2 was contested at the Tercentenary Sports Hall, Gibraltar on 7 February.

Quarter-finals
(England) Nigel Heydon	6
8	(England) James Wade	3
20	(England) Terry Jenkins	3
5	(Scotland) Gary Anderson	6
18	(England) Andy Hamilton	6
7	(England) Wes Newton	5
(Wales) Steve Evans	2
22	(England) Denis Ovens	6

Semi-finals
(England) Nigel Heydon	2
5	(Scotland) Gary Anderson	6
18	(England) Andy Hamilton	1
22	(England) Denis Ovens	6

Final
5	(Scotland) Gary Anderson	5
22	(England) Denis Ovens	6

=== Players Championship 3 ===
- PDPA Players Championship 3 was contested at the Oasis Leisure Centre, Swindon on 20 February.

Quarter-finals		Semi-finals		Final
(England) Ronnie Baxter	6
(England) Mark Walsh	5	(England) Ronnie Baxter	1
(England) Mervyn King	6	(England) Mervyn King	6
(England) Adrian Lewis	4			(England) Mervyn King	6
(England) Andy Hamilton	6			(England) Andy Hamilton	3
(England) Wayne Jones	5	(England) Andy Hamilton	6
(England) Jamie Caven	6	(England) Jamie Caven	5
(England) Colin Lloyd	5

=== Players Championship 4 ===
- PDPA Players Championship 4 was contested at the Moorways Centre, Derby on 27 February.

Quarter-finals		Semi-finals		Final
(England) Phil Taylor	6
(Netherlands) Co Stompé	2	(England) Phil Taylor	6
(England) Chris Thompson	6	(England) Chris Thompson	0
(England) Jamie Caven	4			(England) Phil Taylor	6
(England) Terry Jenkins	6			(England) Terry Jenkins	1
(England) Steve Brown	5	(England) Terry Jenkins	6
(England) Chris Mason	6	(England) Chris Mason	3
(Netherlands) Michael van Gerwen	2

=== Players Championship 5 ===
- PDPA Players Championship 5 was contested at van der Valk Hotel, Gladbeck on 6 March.

Quarter-finals		Semi-finals		Final
(Netherlands) Vincent van der Voort	6
(England) Mark Dudbridge	3	(Netherlands) Vincent van der Voort	6
(England) Kevin Painter	6	(England) Kevin Painter	5
(Netherlands) Co Stompé	2			(Netherlands) Vincent van der Voort	6
(England) Jamie Caven	6			(England) Wayne Jones	2
(England) Colin Osborne	4	(England) Jamie Caven	3
(England) Wayne Jones	6	(England) Wayne Jones	6
(England) Colin Lloyd	5

=== Players Championship 6 ===
- PDPA Players Championship 6 was contested at van der Valk Hotel, Gladbeck on 7 March.

Quarter-finals		Semi-finals		Final
(England) Mark Walsh	6
(England) Steve Brown	5	(England) Mark Walsh	6
(Scotland) Gary Anderson	6	(Scotland) Gary Anderson	3
(England) James Wade	0			(England) Mark Walsh	4
(Northern Ireland) Brendan Dolan	6			(England) Adrian Lewis	6
(Wales) Mark Webster	3	(Northern Ireland) Brendan Dolan	4
(England) Adrian Lewis	6	(England) Adrian Lewis	6
(Scotland) Robert Thornton	5

=== Players Championship 7 ===
- PDPA Players Championship 7 was contested at the Robin Park Tennis Centre, Wigan on 13 March.

Quarter-finals		Semi-finals		Final
(England) Phil Taylor	6
(England) Wes Newton	1	(England) Phil Taylor	6
(England) Colin Lloyd	6	(England) Colin Lloyd	3
(England) Kirk Shepherd	0			(England) Phil Taylor	6
(England) Mark Dudbridge	6			(England) Mark Dudbridge	0
(Wales) Mark Webster	5	(England) Mark Dudbridge	6
(England) Andy Hamilton	6	(England) Andy Hamilton	2
(Scotland) Robert Thornton	3

=== Players Championship 8 ===
- PDPA Players Championship 8 was contested at the K2 Centre, Crawley on 20 March.

Quarter-finals		Semi-finals		Final
(Wales) Barrie Bates	6
(England) Mark Walsh	2	(Wales) Barrie Bates	6
(England) Steve Maish	6	(England) Steve Maish	4
(England) Mark Dudbridge	5			(Wales) Barrie Bates	6
(England) James Wade	6			(England) Denis Ovens	5
(England) Tony Eccles	3	(England) James Wade	5
(England) Denis Ovens	6	(England) Denis Ovens	6
(Netherlands) Vincent van der Voort	5

=== Players Championship 9 ===
- Bobby Bourn Memorial Players Championship 9 was contested at the Metrodome, Barnsley on 10 April.

Quarter-finals		Semi-finals		Final
(England) Mark Walsh	6
(Scotland) Jason Clark	2	(England) Mark Walsh	2
(Australia) Simon Whitlock	6	(Australia) Simon Whitlock	6
(Wales) Barrie Bates	0			(Australia) Simon Whitlock	6
(England) Colin Osborne	6			(Scotland) Gary Anderson	4
(England) Wayne Jones	2	(England) Colin Osborne	5
(Scotland) Gary Anderson	6	(Scotland) Gary Anderson	6
(England) Colin Lloyd	4

=== Players Championship 10 ===
- PDPA Players Championship 10 was contested at the Moorways Sports Village, Derby, on 17 April. Simon Whitlock won his second Pro Tour title, defeating Gary Anderson 6–4 in the final.

Quarter-finals		Semi-finals		Final
(Australia) Paul Nicholson	6
(England) Kevin Painter	0	(Australia) Paul Nicholson	2
(England) Colin Lloyd	6	(England) Colin Lloyd	6
(England) Mark Frost	1			(England) Colin Lloyd	4
(England) Phil Taylor	6			(Australia) Simon Whitlock	6
(England) Wayne Jones	1	(England) Phil Taylor	2
(Australia) Simon Whitlock	6	(Australia) Simon Whitlock	6
(England) Ronnie Baxter	2

=== Players Championship 11 ===
- PDPA Players Championship 11 was contested at the Robin Park Tennis Centre, Wigan on 24 April.

Quarter-finals		Semi-finals		Final
(England) Andy Smith	6
(England) Kevin Painter	4	(England) Andy Smith	6
(Scotland) Gary Anderson	6	(Scotland) Gary Anderson	4
(Wales) Barrie Bates	5			(England) Andy Smith	2
(England) Andy Hamilton	6			(England) Wes Newton	6
(Wales) Mark Webster	2	(England) Andy Hamilton	5
(England) Wes Newton	6	(England) Wes Newton	6
(England) Colin Osborne	4

=== Players Championship 12 ===
- PDPA Players Championship 12 was contested at the Robin Park Tennis Centre, Wigan on 8 May.

Quarter-finals		Semi-finals		Final
(England) Andy Hamilton	6
(England) Mark Walsh	5	(England) Andy Hamilton	6
(Wales) Mark Webster	6	(Wales) Mark Webster	2
(England) James Wade	2			(England) Andy Hamilton	0
(Australia) Simon Whitlock	6			(Australia) Simon Whitlock	6
(England) Jamie Caven	4	(Australia) Simon Whitlock	6
(United States) Gary Mawson	6	(United States) Gary Mawson	1
(England) Adrian Lewis	3

=== Players Championship 13 ===
- PDPA Players Championship 13 Austria at the Renaissance Hotel, Salzburg on 15 May.

Quarter-finals		Semi-finals		Final
(Australia) Simon Whitlock	6
(England) Mervyn King	3	(Australia) Simon Whitlock	6
(England) Adrian Lewis	6	(England) Adrian Lewis	4
(England) Wayne Jones	3			(Australia) Simon Whitlock	6
(England) Steve Beaton	6			(England) Steve Beaton	4
(England) Mark Dudbridge	1	(England) Steve Beaton	6
(England) Phil Taylor	6	(England) Phil Taylor	5
(England) Steve Brown	3

=== Players Championship 14 ===
- PDPA Players Championship 14 Austria at the Renaissance Hotel, Salzburg on 16 May.

Quarter-finals		Semi-finals		Final
(England) Phil Taylor	6
(England) Tony Randell	3	(England) Phil Taylor	6
(England) Colin Lloyd	6	(England) Colin Lloyd	0
(England) Adrian Lewis	2			(England) Phil Taylor	6
(England) Jamie Caven	6			(Australia) Simon Whitlock	4
(England) Steve Hine	4	(England) Jamie Caven	3
(Australia) Simon Whitlock	6	(Australia) Simon Whitlock	6
(England) Wes Newton	4

=== Players Championship 15 ===
- PDPA Players Championship 15 at the Metrodome, Barnsley on 12 June.

Quarter-finals		Semi-finals		Final
(England) Mark Walsh	6
(England) Andy Hamilton	1	(England) Mark Walsh	6
(England) James Wade	6	(England) James Wade	3
(England) Colin Lloyd	5			(England) Mark Walsh	1
(Scotland) Gary Anderson	6			(Scotland) Gary Anderson	6
(England) Mervyn King	1	(Scotland) Gary Anderson	6
(England) Justin Pipe	6	(England) Justin Pipe	4
(England) Wayne Jones	4

=== Players Championship 16 ===
- PDPA Players Championship 16 at the Metrodome, Barnsley on 13 June.

Quarter-finals		Semi-finals		Final
(England) Denis Ovens	6
(England) Andy Hamilton	5	(England) Denis Ovens	6
(England) Mark Walsh	6	(England) Mark Walsh	3
(England) Steve Brown	0			(England) Denis Ovens	5
(England) Ronnie Baxter	6			(England) Ronnie Baxter	6
(England) Dennis Priestley	5	(England) Ronnie Baxter	6
(England) Adrian Lewis	6	(England) Adrian Lewis	0
(England) Alan Tabern	5

=== Players Championship 17 ===
- PDPA Players Championship 17 at the Van Der Valk Hotel, Haarlem on 19 June.

Quarter-finals		Semi-finals		Final
(England) Mervyn King	6
(Spain) Antonio Alcinas	5	(England) Mervyn King	0
(Netherlands) Vincent van der Voort	6	(Netherlands) Vincent van der Voort	6
(England) Tony Eccles	4			(Netherlands) Vincent van der Voort	6
(Scotland) Gary Anderson	6			(England) Wayne Jones	5
(Netherlands) Jelle Klaasen	2	(Scotland) Gary Anderson	1
(England) Wayne Jones	6	(England) Wayne Jones	6
(England) Adrian Lewis	4

=== Players Championship 18 ===
- PDPA Players Championship 18 at the Van Der Valk Hotel, Haarlem on 20 June.

Quarter-finals		Semi-finals		Final
(England) Steve Brown	6
(England) Justin Pipe	4	(England) Steve Brown	5
(England) Andy Smith	6	(England) Andy Smith	6
(England) Kevin Painter	3			(England) Andy Smith	6
(Netherlands) Co Stompé	6			(England) Alan Tabern	4
(England) Nigel Heydon	4	(England) Alan Tabern	6
(England) Alan Tabern	6	(Netherlands) Co Stompé	2
(Netherlands) Vincent van der Voort	3

=== Players Championship 19 ===
- US Open Players Championship 19 at the Tropicana Hotel, Las Vegas, Nevada on 27 June.

Quarter-finals		Semi-finals		Final
(England) Phil Taylor	6
(England) Mark Walsh	2	(England) Phil Taylor	6
(England) James Wade	6	(England) James Wade	1
(England) Adrian Lewis	5			(England) Phil Taylor	6
(Netherlands) Jelle Klaasen	6			(England) Denis Ovens	3
(Scotland) Gary Anderson	3	(Netherlands) Jelle Klaasen	3
(England) Denis Ovens	6	(England) Denis Ovens	6
(England) Terry Jenkins	4

=== Players Championship 20 ===
- Players Championship 20 at the Tropicana Hotel, Las Vegas, Nevada on 28 June.

Quarter-finals		Semi-finals		Final
(England) Chris Thompson	6
(England) Phil Taylor	5	(England) Chris Thompson	2
(Australia) Simon Whitlock	6	(Australia) Simon Whitlock	6
(Canada) Ken MacNeil	5			(Australia) Simon Whitlock	4
(Scotland) Gary Anderson	6			(Scotland) Gary Anderson	6
(Singapore) Paul Lim	2	(Scotland) Gary Anderson	6
(England) Colin Lloyd	6	(England) Colin Lloyd	2
(England) Ronnie Baxter	2

=== Players Championship 21 ===
- Players Championship 21 at the Tropicana Hotel, Las Vegas, Nevada on 29 June.

Quarter-finals		Semi-finals		Final
(England) Matt Clark	6
(England) Phil Taylor	5	(England) Matt Clark	0
(Netherlands) Co Stompé	6	(Netherlands) Co Stompé	6
(Netherlands) Jelle Klaasen	4			(Netherlands) Co Stompé	6
(England) James Wade	6			(England) James Wade	3
(Australia) Simon Whitlock	4	(England) James Wade	6
(England) Colin Lloyd	6	(England) Colin Lloyd	3
(England) Wes Newton	4

=== Players Championship 22 ===
- Australian Open Players Championship 22 at the Revesby Workers Club, Sydney on 22 August.

Quarter-finals		Semi-finals		Final
(England) Dennis Priestley	6
(Australia) Simon Whitlock	3	(England) Dennis Priestley	6
(Australia) Paul Nicholson	6	(Australia) Paul Nicholson	5
(Australia) Rob Modra	2			(England) Dennis Priestley	6
(Australia) Sean Reed	6			(England) Mark Hylton	3
(New Zealand) Preston Ridd	3	(Australia) Sean Reed	5
(England) Mark Hylton	6	(England) Mark Hylton	6
(England) Mark Walsh	2

=== Players Championship 23 ===
- Canadian Players Championship 23 at the Hilton, London, Ontario on 28 August.

Quarter-finals		Semi-finals		Final
(England) Wes Newton	6
(England) Colin Osborne	2	(England) Wes Newton	2
(Netherlands) Michael van Gerwen	6	(Netherlands) Michael van Gerwen	6
(England) Kevin Painter	4			(Netherlands) Michael van Gerwen	4
(England) Dennis Priestley	6			(England) Jamie Caven	6
(England) Mark Dudbridge	5	(England) Dennis Priestley	2
(England) Jamie Caven	6	(England) Jamie Caven	6
(England) Andy Hamilton	4

=== Players Championship 24 ===
- Canadian Masters Players Championships 24 at the Hilton, London, Ontario on 29 August.

Quarter-finals		Semi-finals		Final
(England) Wes Newton	6
(England) Mark Dudbridge	2	(England) Wes Newton	4
(England) Colin Lloyd	6	(England) Colin Lloyd	6
(England) Kevin Painter	4			(England) Colin Lloyd	6
(England) Jamie Caven	6			(England) Jamie Caven	1
(England) Alan Tabern	5	(England) Jamie Caven	6
(England) Steve Maish	6	(England) Steve Maish	2
(England) Dennis Priestley	5

=== Players Championship 25 ===
- PDPA Players Championship 25 at the K2 Centre, Crawley on 4 September.

Quarter-finals		Semi-finals		Final
(England) Steve Farmer	6
(England) Mark Dudbridge	3	(England) Steve Farmer	6
(Scotland) Gary Anderson	6	(Scotland) Gary Anderson	5
(England) Wayne Jones	4			(England) Steve Farmer	4
(Netherlands) Vincent van der Voort	6			(England) Adrian Lewis	6
(England) Mervyn King	5	(Netherlands) Vincent van der Voort	5
(England) Adrian Lewis	6	(England) Adrian Lewis	6
(Wales) Mark Webster	5

=== Players Championship 26 ===
- PDPA Players Championship 26 at the K2 Centre, Crawley on 5 September.

Quarter-finals		Semi-finals		Final
(Australia) Simon Whitlock	6
(Northern Ireland) Brendan Dolan	4	(Australia) Simon Whitlock	6
(England) Jamie Caven	6	(England) Jamie Caven	4
(Netherlands) Co Stompé	3			(Australia) Simon Whitlock	4
(England) Alan Tabern	6			(England) Colin Lloyd	6
(Australia) Paul Nicholson	4	(England) Alan Tabern	3
(England) Colin Lloyd	6	(England) Colin Lloyd	6
(England) Tony Eccles	5

=== Players Championship 27 ===
- PDPA Players Championship 27 in Nuland on 18 September.

Quarter-finals		Semi-finals		Final
(England) James Wade	6
(England) Alan Tabern	4	(England) James Wade	6
(England) Colin Osborne	6	(England) Colin Osborne	2
(England) Mervyn King	3			(England) James Wade	6
(England) Terry Jenkins	6			(England) Terry Jenkins	4
(Belgium) Kim Huybrechts	3	(England) Terry Jenkins	6
(England) Wes Newton	6	(England) Wes Newton	4
(England) Jamie Caven	5

=== Players Championship 28 ===
- PDPA Players Championship 28 in Nuland on 19 September.

Quarter-finals		Semi-finals		Final
(Australia) Simon Whitlock	6
(Northern Ireland) Brendan Dolan	0	(Australia) Simon Whitlock	4
(England) Kevin Painter	6	(England) Kevin Painter	6
(England) Kevin McDine	3			(England) Kevin Painter	4
(England) Steve Maish	6			(England) Steve Farmer	6
(England) Justin Pipe	4	(England) Steve Maish	4
(England) Steve Farmer	6	(England) Steve Farmer	6
(England) Tony Ayres	4

=== Players Championship 29 ===
- PDPA Players Championship 29 at the Citywest Hotel, Dublin on 2 October.

Quarter-finals		Semi-finals		Final
(Australia) Simon Whitlock	6
(England) Andy Hamilton	4	(Australia) Simon Whitlock	6
(England) Justin Pipe	6	(England) Justin Pipe	5
(Netherlands) Co Stompé	5			(Australia) Simon Whitlock	6
(England) Dennis Priestley	6			(England) Dennis Priestley	1
(England) Ronnie Baxter	5	(England) Dennis Priestley	6
(England) Ian White	6	(England) Ian White	2
(England) Alan Tabern	4

=== Players Championship 30 ===
- PDPA Players Championship 30 at the Citywest Hotel, Dublin on October 3

Quarter-finals		Semi-finals		Final
(England) Ronnie Baxter	6
(England) Tony Eccles	2	(England) Ronnie Baxter	6
(England) Steve Beaton	6	(England) Steve Beaton	2
(England) Wayne Jones	4			(England) Ronnie Baxter	5
(England) Jamie Caven	6			(England) Jamie Caven	6
(Netherlands) Jelle Klaasen	1	(England) Jamie Caven	6
(Northern Ireland) Michael Mansell	6	(Northern Ireland) Michael Mansell	4
(England) Dennis Smith	1

=== Players Championship 31 ===
- John McEvoy Gold Dart Classic Players Championship 31 at the National Event Centre, Killarney on 17 October.

Quarter-finals		Semi-finals		Final
(Wales) Richie Burnett	6
(England) Nigel Heydon	2	(Wales) Richie Burnett	5
(Scotland) Gary Anderson	6	(Scotland) Gary Anderson	6
(England) Jamie Caven	3			(Scotland) Gary Anderson	6
(England) Dennis Smith	6			(England) Dennis Smith	1
(Wales) Barrie Bates	1	(England) Dennis Smith	6
(England) Colin Osborne	6	(England) Colin Osborne	4
(England) Joe Cullen	2

=== Players Championship 32 ===
- PDPA Players Championship 32 at the Dolce Bad Nauheim on 23 October.

Quarter-finals		Semi-finals		Final
(Australia) Simon Whitlock	6
(England) Mark Walsh	5	(Australia) Simon Whitlock	2
(Wales) Richie Burnett	6	(Wales) Richie Burnett	6
(England) Colin Osborne	5			(Wales) Richie Burnett	4
(Germany) Andree Welge	6			(Wales) Mark Webster	6
(Scotland) Gary Anderson	5	(Germany) Andree Welge	5
(Wales) Mark Webster	6	(Wales) Mark Webster	6
(England) Dennis Smith	5

=== Players Championship 33 ===
- PDPA Players Championship 33 at the Dolce Bad Nauheim on 24 October.

Quarter-finals		Semi-finals		Final
(Australia) Simon Whitlock	6
(England) Mark Walsh	3	(Australia) Simon Whitlock	6
(England) Ronnie Baxter	6	(England) Ronnie Baxter	3
(England) Jamie Caven	3			(Australia) Simon Whitlock	6
(Scotland) Gary Anderson	6			(Wales) Richie Burnett	4
(England) Tony Eccles	4	(Scotland) Gary Anderson	4
(Wales) Richie Burnett	6	(Wales) Richie Burnett	6
(England) Andy Jenkins	5

=== Players Championship 34 ===
- PDPA Players Championship 34 at the Metrodome, Barnsley on 6 November.

Quarter-finals		Semi-finals		Final
(England) Steve Beaton	6
(England) Terry Jenkins	1	(England) Steve Beaton	1
(England) Wes Newton	6	(England) Wes Newton	6
(England) Kevin Painter	3			(England) Wes Newton	6
(England) Colin Lloyd	6			(England) Colin Lloyd	3
(England) James Wade	3	(England) Colin Lloyd	6
(Wales) Mark Webster	6	(Wales) Mark Webster	3
(England) Martyn Turner	3

=== Players Championship 35 ===
- PDPA Players Championship 35 at the Metrodome, Barnsley on 7 November.

Quarter-finals		Semi-finals		Final
(England) Ronnie Baxter	6
(Netherlands) Co Stompé	4	(England) Ronnie Baxter	3
(England) Wes Newton	6	(England) Wes Newton	6
(England) Colin Osborne	4			(England) Wes Newton	6
(England) Mark Walsh	6			(Wales) Mark Webster	1
(Scotland) Gary Anderson	2	(England) Mark Walsh	5
(Wales) Mark Webster	6	(Wales) Mark Webster	6
(England) Dennis Priestley	1

=== Players Championship 36 ===
- PDPA Players Championship 36 at the Moorways Centre, Derby on 26 November.

Quarter-finals		Semi-finals		Final
(England) Mark Walsh	6
(Australia) Simon Whitlock	2	(England) Mark Walsh	6
(England) Justin Pipe	6	(England) Justin Pipe	4
(England) Denis Ovens	0			(England) Mark Walsh	3
(England) Dennis Priestley	6			(England) Phil Taylor	6
(England) Steve Farmer	5	(England) Dennis Priestley	1
(England) Phil Taylor	6	(England) Phil Taylor	6
(England) Steve Beaton	1

=== Players Championship 37 ===
- PDPA Players Championship 37 at the Moorways Centre, Derby on 27 November.

Quarter-finals		Semi-finals		Final
(Australia) Simon Whitlock	6
(Netherlands) Vincent van der Voort	1	(Australia) Simon Whitlock	0
(England) Phil Taylor	6	(England) Phil Taylor	6
(England) Wes Newton	4			(England) Phil Taylor	4
(England) Mark Walsh	6			(England) Mark Walsh	6
(England) Kevin McDine	0	(England) Mark Walsh	6
(England) Wayne Mardle	6	(England) Wayne Mardle	5
(Scotland) Robert Thornton	4

== UK Open Qualifiers ==
No.	Date	Venue	Winner	Legs	Runner-up
1	Sunday February 21	Oasis Leisure Centre, Swindon	Mervyn King (England)	6–1	(Australia) Simon Whitlock
2	Sunday February 28	Moorways Centre, Derby	Mark Walsh (England)	6–2	(England) Phil Taylor
3	Sunday March 14	Robin Park Tennis Centre, Wigan	Phil Taylor (England)	6–0	(England) Jamie Caven
4	Sunday March 21	K2 Centre, Crawley	Gary Anderson (Scotland)	6–5	(England) Wes Newton
5	Sunday April 11	Barnsley Metrodome, Barnsley	Mark Walsh (England)	6–3	(Canada) John Part
6	Sunday April 18	Moorsway Centre, Derby	Phil Taylor (England)	6–2	(Scotland) Peter Wright
7	Sunday April 25	Robin Park Tennis Centre, Wigan	Colin Lloyd (England)	6–3	(England) Colin Osborne
8	Sunday May 9	Robin Park Tennis Centre, Wigan	James Wade (England)	6–2	(Scotland) Gary Anderson

== Australian Grand Prix Pro Tour ==
The Australian Grand Prix rankings are calculated from events across Australia. The top player in the rankings automatically qualifies for the 2011 World Championship.

No.	Date	Also known as	Winner	Legs	Runner-up	Ref.
1	Saturday 23 January	Revesby Workers Club Open 1	Simon Whitlock (Australia)	6–3	(Australia) Jerry Weyman	
2	Sunday 24 January	Revesby Workers Club Open 2	Shane Tichowitsch (Australia)	6–5	(Australia) Rod Neeson	
3	Saturday 6 February	Unanderra Hotel Darts Open	Simon Whitlock (Australia)	6–0	(Australia) Barry Jouannet Jr	
4	Sunday 7 February	DPA Australian Singles	Simon Whitlock (Australia)	6–1	(Australia) Rob Modra	
5	Saturday 13 March	Coogee Bay Classic 1	Shane Tichowitsch (Australia)	6–2	(Australia) Mitchell Clegg	
6	Sunday 14 March	Coogee Bay Classic 2	Rob Modra (Australia)	6–5	(Australia) Brendan McCausland	
7	Saturday 27 March	NDDA Open 1	Peter Machin (Australia)	6–5	(Australia) Brendan McCausland	
8	Sunday 28 March	NDDA Open 2	Danny Scally (Australia)	6–3	(Australia) Craig Prizeman	
9	Saturday 17 April	Criterion Hotel Open 1	Rob Modra (Australia)	6–5	(Australia) Graham Davis	
10	Sunday 18 April	Criterion Hotel Open 2	Rob Modra (Australia)	6–5	(Australia) Craig Prizeman	
11	Saturday 7 May	Goulburn Open 1	Shane Tichowitsch (Australia)	6–2	(Australia) Rob Modra	
12	Sunday 8 May	Goulburn Open 2	Barry Jouannet Jr (Australia)	6–5	(Australia) Shane Tichowitsch	
13	Saturday 22 May	Queensland Open 1	Rob Modra (Australia)	6–0	(Australia) Bill Aitken	
14	Sunday 23 May	Queensland Open 2	Shane Tichowitsch (Australia)	6–3	(Australia) Bill Aitken	
15	Saturday 5 June	Gaels Club Open 1	Shane Tichowitsch (Australia)	6–3	(Australia) Brian Roach	
16	Sunday 6 June	Gaels Club Open 2	Craig Prizeman (Australia)	6–1	(Australia) Rob Modra	
17	Saturday 19 June	Mittagong RSL Open 1	Phillip Hazel (New Zealand)	6–3	(Australia) Rob Modra	
18	Sunday 20 June	Mittagong RSL Open 2	Sean Reed (Australia)	6–4	(New Zealand) Phillip Hazel	
19	Saturday 17 July	Southern Illawarra Open	Bill Aitken (Australia)	6–5	(Australia) Barry Jouannet Jr	
20	Sunday 18 July	Warilla Bowls Club Open	Craig Prizeman (Australia)	6–3	(Australia) Rob Modra	
21	Sunday 15 August	Oceanic Masters	Simon Whitlock (Australia)	6–5	(Australia) Shane Tichowitsch	
22	Friday 20 August	Revesby Workers Club Open 3	Robert Thornton (Scotland)	6–4	(Australia) Dave Muller	
23	Saturday 21 August	Revesby Workers Club Open 4	Tony Eccles (England)	6–5	(England) David Platt	
24	Sunday 22 August	Australian Open Players Championship	Dennis Priestley (England)	6–3	(England) Mark Hylton	
25	Saturday 25 September	Billabong Tavern Darts Open	Rob Modra (Australia)	6–4	(Australia) Michael Cassar	
26	Sunday 26 September	Russell Stewart Classic	Shane Tichowitsch (Australia)	6–4	(Australia) Wayne Weening	
27	Saturday 9 October	DPA Australian Matchplay 1	Phillip Hazel (New Zealand)	6–3	(Australia) Rob Modra	
28	Sunday 10 October	DPA Australian Matchplay 2	Mitchell Clegg (Australia)	6–2	(Australia) Dave Breasley	

== Other PDC tournaments ==
The PDC also held a number of other tournaments during 2010. These were mainly smaller events with low prize money, and some had eligibility restrictions. All of these tournaments were non-ranking.

Date	Event	Winner	Score	Runner-Up
June 26	World Cricket Championship	(England) Phil Taylor	3–2	(England) Mark Walsh
June 30	North American Darts Championship	(Canada) John Part	6–4	(United States) Darin Young
August 15	Oceanic Masters	(Australia) Simon Whitlock	6–5	(Australia) Shane Tichowitsch
September 12	PDC World Japan Qualifying Event	(Japan) Morihiro Hashimoto	6–0	(Japan) Mitsumasa Hoshino
September 25	South African Masters	(South Africa) Devon Petersen	5–4	(South Africa) Les Francis
October 10	Tom Kirby Memorial Irish Matchplay	(Northern Ireland) Michael Mansell	6–4	(Republic of Ireland) Stephen Byrne
October 16	Gleneagle Irish Masters	(Australia) Simon Whitlock	6–4	(England) Phil Taylor
October 30	PDC World East European Qualifying Event	(Austria) Dietmar Burger	6–2	(Austria) Christian Kallinger
November 5	PDC World Sweden Qualifying Event	(Sweden) Magnus Caris	6–1	(Sweden) Par Riihonen
November 6	PDC World South European Qualifying Event	(Croatia) Boris Krcmar	6–4	(Croatia) Zdravko Antunovic
November 6	Caribbean and South American Masters	(Guyana) Norman Madhoo	4–2	(Barbados) Anthony Forde
November 20	PDC World Finland Qualifying Event	(Finland) Veijo Viinikka	beat	(Finland) Sami Sanssi
November 20	PDC World West European Qualifying Event	(Netherlands) Roland Scholten	6–4	(Spain) Armando Jimenez
November 28	PDC World Russia Qualifying Event	(Russia) Andrei Ratnikov	8–1	(Russia) Anastasia Dobromyslova
November 28	PDC World Greater China Qualifying Event	(Hong Kong) Scott MacKenzie	beat	(Hong Kong) Alex Hon
November 29	PDC World Darts Championship PDPA Qualifier	(England) Alex Roy	5–1	(England) Matt Padgett
