= 2010 UK Open =

2010 Rileys Darts Zones UK Open

Tournament information
- Dates: 3–6 June 2010
- Venue: Reebok Stadium
- Location: Bolton
- Country: England
- Organisation(s): PDC
- Format: Legs; Final – best of 21
- Prize fund: £200,000
- Winner's share: £40,000
- Nine-dart finish: (England) Mervyn King
- High checkout: 167 (England) Phil Taylor (final)

Champion(s)
- (England) Phil Taylor

The 2010 Rileys Darts Zones UK Open was the eighth year of the PDC darts tournament where, following numerous regional qualifying heats throughout Britain, players competed in a single elimination tournament to be crowned champion. The tournament was held at the Reebok Stadium in Bolton, England, from 3–6 June 2010, and had the nickname, "the FA Cup of darts" as a random draw was staged after each round until the final.

It was eventually won by Phil Taylor who defeated Scotland's Gary Anderson 11–5 to make it his fourth UK Open and second consecutive championship. Earlier in the tournament, Anderson was on the wrong side of a nine-dart finish from Mervyn King.

In the fourth round of this tournament, Phil Taylor beat Kevin Painter 9–0 with a 3–dart average of 118.66, which at the time was the all-time highest 3–dart average for a televised darts match. It was eventually beaten on 25 February 2016 in the 2016 Premier League Darts meeting in Aberdeen, when Michael van Gerwen averaged 123.40 in beating Michael Smith 7–1.

== 2010 UK Open qualifiers ==
There were eight qualifying events staged between February and May 2010 to determine the UK Open Order of Merit Table. The tournament winners were:

No.	Winner	Score	Runner-up	Total Prize Money	Winner	Runner-up
1	(England) Mervyn King	6–1	(Australia) Simon Whitlock	£31,200	£6,000	£3,000
2	(England) Mark Walsh	6–2	(England) Phil Taylor	£31,200	£6,000	£3,000
3	(England) Phil Taylor	6–0	(England) Jamie Caven	£31,200	£6,000	£3,000
4	(Scotland) Gary Anderson	6–5	(England) Wes Newton	£31,200	£6,000	£3,000
5	(England) Mark Walsh	6–3	(Canada) John Part	£31,200	£6,000	£3,000
6	(England) Phil Taylor	6–2	(Scotland) Peter Wright	£31,200	£6,000	£3,000
7	(England) Colin Lloyd	6–3	(England) Colin Osborne	£31,200	£6,000	£3,000
8	(England) James Wade	6–2	(Scotland) Gary Anderson	£31,200	£6,000	£3,000

== Format and qualifiers ==
The tournament featured 138 players. As in previous years, eight regional UK Open events were staged across the UK where players winning were collated into the UK Open Order Of Merit. The top 96 players and ties in the list, who played a minimum of three events received a place at the final stages.

=== Top 32 in Order of Merit (receiving byes into third round) ===
1. (England) Mark Walsh
2. (England) Phil Taylor
3. (Scotland) Gary Anderson
4. (England) James Wade
5. (England) Colin Lloyd
6. (England) Mervyn King
7. (England) Jamie Caven
8. (England) Wes Newton
9. (Canada) John Part
10. (England) Colin Osborne
11. (England) Andy Hamilton
12. (Australia) Simon Whitlock
13. (Netherlands) Vincent van der Voort
14. (England) Wayne Jones
15. (Wales) Mark Webster
16. (Scotland) Peter Wright
17. (Netherlands) Jelle Klaasen
18. (England) Kevin Painter
19. (Netherlands) Co Stompé
20. (England) Adrian Lewis
21. (Netherlands) Michael van Gerwen
22. (England) Mark Dudbridge
23. (England) Alan Tabern
24. (England) Steve Maish
25. (Northern Ireland) Brendan Dolan
26. (England) Terry Jenkins
27. (England) Dennis Priestley
28. (England) Matt Clark
29. (England) Ronnie Baxter
30. (England) Denis Ovens
31. (England) Tony Eccles
32. (England) Nigel Heydon

The Rileys qualifiers and the players outside the top 32 of the UK Open Order of Merit began the tournament on the Thursday night. They played down to 32 players, and they were joined by the top 32 of the UK Open Order of Merit the following night, to provide the competition's last 64. A random draw was made after each subsequent round.

=== Number 33-64 of the Order of Merit (receiving byes into second round) ===
33. (England) Andy Smith
34. (Australia) Paul Nicholson
35. (England) Chris Thompson
36. (England) Mark Frost
37. (England) Justin Pipe
38. (England) Mark Lawrence
39. (England) Nick Fullwell
40. (England) Colin Monk
41. (England) Steve Beaton
42. (Wales) Barrie Bates
43. (England) Darren Johnson
44. (England) Dennis Smith
45. (England) Adrian Gray
46. (Scotland) Robert Thornton
47. (England) Chris Mason
48. (Netherlands) Roland Scholten
49. (Wales) Steve Evans
50. (England) Steve Brown
51. (England) Mark Cox
52. (England) Michael Barnard
53. (England) Wayne Mardle
54. (Republic of Ireland) Mick McGowan
55. (England) Kirk Shepherd
56. (England) Arron Monk
57. (England) Michael Smith
58. (England) Kevin McDine
59. (England) Stephen Hardy
60. (England) Peter Manley
61. (Wales) Wayne Atwood
62. (England) Tony Ayres
63. (England) Alex Roy
64. (England) Stuart Dutton

=== Remaining Order of Merit qualifiers (starting in first and preliminary round) ===
65. (England) Steve Farmer
66. (United States) Gary Mawson
67. (England) Kevin Dowling
68. (England) Steve Hine
69. (England) Peter Hudson
70. (England) Dave Smith
71. (England) Simon Cunningham
72. (England) John Quantock
73. (Germany) Jyhan Artut
74. (England) Joe Cullen
75. (England) Mark Stephenson
76. (England) Matt Padgett
77. (England) Dave Honey
78. (England) Gary Eastwood
79. (England) Darren Webster
80. (England) Louis Blundell
81. (Gibraltar) Dylan Duo
82. (Scotland) Jason Clark
83. (Republic of Ireland) William O'Connor
84. (England) Scott Rand
85. (Sweden) Par Riihonen
86. (England) Sam Allen
87. (England) Anton Liscsey
88. (England) Danny Pinhorne
89. (England) Paul Rowley
90. (England) Martyn Turner
91. (England) Darren Latham
92. (England) Robbie Newland
93. (Wales) Richie Burnett
94. (England) Matt Draper
95. (Scotland) Chris Loudon
96. (England) Andy Hutchings

32 players qualified from Rileys qualifiers held in Rileys Dart Zones across Britain.

- (Scotland) Melvyn Johnston
- (England) Paul Gibbs
- (England) Tony Broughton
- (England) Dean Edlin
- (England) Michael Hammond
- (England) Darren Sullivan
- (England) Ricky Evans
- (England) Alex Harrison
- (Wales) James Erricker
- (England) John Bowles
- (England) Noel Grant
- (England) Henry Murphy
- (England) Paul Neate
- (Scotland) John Robertson
- (Scotland) Ryan Murray
- (England) John Lakeman
- (England) Barrie Knight
- (England) Mark Wilson
- (England) Reece Robinson
- (England) Bradley Williams
- (England) Jamie Green
- (England) Ashley Whisker
- (England) Paul Warwick
- (England) Paul Whitworth
- (England) Stuart Monaghan
- (England) Barrie Webb
- (England) Joe Palmer
- (England) Pete Fisher
- (Isle of Man) Simon Jones
- (England) Dean Stewart
- (England) Nicky Bache
- (England) Dean Harris

10 players qualified as BDO representatives from Avon, Bedfordshire, East Stirlingshire, Gloucestershire, Hampshire, Lothian, Northumberland, Nottinghamshire, Surrey, Warwickshire. These counties were rewarded one spot each in the UK Open for voting in favour of listening to Barry Hearn's proposed takeover of the BDO.

- (England) Mike Nott
- (England) Kevin Lowe
- (Scotland) Andy Murray
- (Northern Ireland) Henry O'Neill
- (England) Tony Hutchinson
- (Scotland) Hugh Ringland
- (England) Ian Gleeson
- (England) Jay Foreman
- (Scotland) Mark Harris
- (India) Prakash Jiwa

== Prize money ==
For the second consecutive UK Open, the prize fund was £200,000.

Stage (no. of players)		Prize money (Total: £200,000)
Winner	(1)	£40,000
Runner-Up	(1)	£20,000
Semi-finalists	(2)	£10,000
Quarter-finalists	(4)	£6,000
Last 16 (fifth round)	(8)	£4,000
Last 32 (fourth round)	(16)	£2,000
Last 64 (third round)	(32)	£1,000
Last 96 (second round)	(32)	n/a
Last 128 (first round)	(32)	n/a
Last 138 (preliminary round)	(10)	n/a

== Draw ==
The draw for the preliminary, first and second rounds was made on 13 May.

=== Thursday 3 June; Best of 11 legs ===
==== Preliminary round ====
Player #1	Score	Player #2
(England) Andy Hutchings	3–6	(England) Darren Webster
(England) Kevin Lowe	2–6	(Scotland) Jason Clark
(England) Kevin Dowling	1–6	(Germany) Jyhan Artut
(England) Dean Stewart	2–6	(Gibraltar) Dylan Duo
(India) Prakash Jiwa	6–4	(England) John Lakeman

Player #1	Score	Player #2
(Scotland) Andy Murray	1–6	(England) Scott Rand
(Sweden) Par Riihonen	5–6	(England) Steve Farmer
(England) Reece Robinson	6–0	(Scotland) Hugh Ringland
(England) Ashley Whisker	2–6	(United States) Gary Mawson
(England) Peter Hudson	6–1	(England) Paul Neate

==== Round 1 ====
Player #1	Score	Player #2
(England) Darren Sullivan	†	(England) Tony Hutchinson
(Scotland) Ryan Murray	4–6	(Scotland) Jason Clark
(England) Alex Harrison	1–6	(England) Jamie Green
(England) Simon Cunningham	6–4	(India) Prakash Jiwa
(England) Matt Draper	2–6	(Scotland) Mark Harris
(England) Tony Broughton	6–3	(England) Mark Stephenson
(Germany) Jyhan Artut	3–6	(England) Scott Rand
(England) Robbie Newland	6–5	(Scotland) John Robertson
(England) Sam Allen	3–6	(Scotland) Melvyn Johnston
(England) Stuart Monaghan	0–6	(Republic of Ireland) William O'Connor
(England) Mark Wilson	3–6	(England) Paul Gibbs
(England) Gary Eastwood	6–5	(Wales) James Erricker
(England) Noel Grant	4–6	(England) Ricky Evans
(England) John Quantock	3–6	(England) Matt Padgett
(England) Louis Blundell	6–5	(Wales) Richie Burnett
(England) Michael Hammond	2–6	(Northern Ireland) Henry O'Neill

Player #1	Score	Player #2
(England) Steve Farmer	‡	(England) Dean Edlin
(England) Paul Rowley	3–6	(England) Anton Liscsey
(England) Pete Fisher	6–2	(England) Barrie Webb
(Isle of Man) Simon Jones	4–6	(England) John Bowles
(England) Nicky Bache	4–6	(England) Martyn Turner
(United States) Gary Mawson	4–6	(Gibraltar) Dylan Duo
(England) Bradley Williams	1–6	(England) Joe Palmer
(England) Danny Pinhorne	4–6	(England) Reece Robinson
(England) Dave Honey	2–6	(England) Mike Nott
(England) Henry Murphy	3–6	(England) Paul Warwick
(England) Darren Latham	1–6	(England) Joe Cullen
(England) Dean Harris	1–6	(England) Darren Webster
(England) Peter Hudson	3–6	(England) Dave Smith
(Scotland) Chris Loudon	5–6	(England) Paul Whitworth
(England) Steve Hine	6–5	(England) Ian Gleeson
(England) Jay Foreman	6–1	(England) Barrie Knight

- ‡ Steve Farmer received a bye as Dean Edlin was disqualified because he did not register
- † Tony Hutchinson received a bye as Darren Sullivan was disqualified because he did not register

==== Round 2 ====
Player #1	Score	Player #2
(Republic of Ireland) William O'Connor	6–3	(England) Mark Frost
(England) Justin Pipe	4–6	(England) Chris Thompson
(England) Colin Monk	6–4	(England) Darren Johnson
(Wales) Wayne Atwood	6–4	(England) Steve Brown
(England) Stuart Dutton	5–6	(England) Simon Cunningham
(England) Tony Hutchinson	1–6	(Wales) Steve Evans
(England) Anton Liscsey	5–6	(Wales) Barrie Bates
(England) Tony Broughton	6–4	(England) Scott Rand
(England) Mike Nott	3–6	(England) Joe Cullen
(England) Paul Warwick	6–3	(England) Steve Farmer
(Scotland) Jason Clark	5–6	(England) Matt Padgett
(Scotland) Mark Harris	6–4	(England) Martyn Turner
(England) Kirk Shepherd	6–4	(England) Adrian Gray
(England) Darren Webster	5–6	(England) Andy Smith
(England) Ricky Evans	2–6	(England) Steve Beaton
(Scotland) Robert Thornton	6–2	(England) Paul Gibbs

Player #1	Score	Player #2
(England) John Bowles	3–6	(England) Michael Barnard
(England) Mark Cox	6–5	(Northern Ireland) Henry O'Neill
(England) Dave Smith	4–6	(Australia) Paul Nicholson
(England) Joe Palmer	3–6	(Netherlands) Roland Scholten
(England) Gary Eastwood	4–6	(Gibraltar) Dylan Duo
(England) Stephen Hardy	6–4	(England) Jay Foreman
(England) Alex Roy	6–3	(England) Mark Lawrence
(England) Wayne Mardle	6–3	(Republic of Ireland) Mick McGowan
(England) Kevin McDine	6–2	(England) Jamie Green
(England) Michael Smith	6–3	(England) Peter Manley
(England) Nick Fullwell	3–6	(England) Arron Monk
(England) Tony Ayres	6–4	(England) Paul Whitworth
(England) Steve Hine	6–1	(Scotland) Melvyn Johnston
(England) Louis Blundell	1–6	(England) Reece Robinson
(England) Pete Fisher	*6 – 0	(England) Chris Mason
(England) Robbie Newland	1–6	(England) Dennis Smith

- * Chris Mason withdrew for personal reasons.

=== Friday 4 June; best of 17 legs ===
==== Round 3 ====
Player #1	Score	Player #2
(England) Steve Maish	9–8	(England) Dennis Priestley
(Gibraltar) Dylan Duo	3–9	(England) Colin Osborne
(Wales) Mark Webster	6–9	(England) Tony Eccles
(England) Stephen Hardy	8–9	(England) Alan Tabern
(Canada) John Part	6–9	(England) Mark Walsh
(England) Mark Dudbridge	7–9	(England) Nigel Heydon
(England) Denis Ovens	9–5	(England) Arron Monk
(England) Reece Robinson	5–9	(Australia) Simon Whitlock
(Scotland) Robert Thornton	9–8	(England) Mark Cox
(England) Mervyn King	9–5	(England) Joe Cullen
(Scotland) Peter Wright	7–9	(Republic of Ireland) William O'Connor
(England) Paul Warwick	9–3	(Netherlands) Co Stompé
(England) Tony Ayres	9–3	(England) Pete Fisher
(England) Dennis Smith	9–5	(England) Colin Monk
(England) Andy Smith	9–5	(England) Colin Lloyd
(Wales) Barrie Bates	8–9	(England) Alex Roy

Player #1	Score	Player #2
(England) Kevin Painter	9–5	(Scotland) Mark Harris
(Netherlands) Roland Scholten	9–3	(England) Simon Cunningham
(England) Steve Hine	7–9	(England) James Wade
(England) Andy Hamilton	9–1	(Northern Ireland) Brendan Dolan
(England) Matt Clark	3–9	(England) Michael Smith
(England) Tony Broughton	0–9	(England) Kevin McDine
(England) Steve Beaton	3–9	(England) Jamie Caven
(England) Wayne Mardle	2–9	(England) Phil Taylor
(England) Adrian Lewis	9–3	(England) Michael Barnard
(England) Wes Newton	9–1	(England) Terry Jenkins
(England) Kirk Shepherd	6–9	(Australia) Paul Nicholson
(Netherlands) Michael van Gerwen	4–9	(Scotland) Gary Anderson
(Wales) Steve Evans	6–9	(Netherlands) Jelle Klaasen
(England) Ronnie Baxter	9–4	(England) Chris Thompson
(Netherlands) Vincent van der Voort	7–9	(Wales) Wayne Atwood
(England) Wayne Jones	9–2	(England) Matt Padgett

=== Saturday 5 June; best of 17 legs ===
==== Round 4 ====
Player #1	Score	Player #2
(England) Denis Ovens	9–7	(England) Dennis Smith
(Netherlands) Roland Scholten	5–9	(England) Alan Tabern
(England) Alex Roy	6–9	(England) Andy Hamilton
(England) Wayne Jones	9–6	(Netherlands) Jelle Klaasen
(England) Andy Smith	9–5	(England) Jamie Caven
(Republic of Ireland) William O'Connor	3–9	(England) James Wade
(England) Mark Walsh	7–9	(England) Tony Ayres
(England) Adrian Lewis	9–5	(England) Colin Osborne

Player #1	Score	Player #2
(England) Kevin Painter	0–9	(England) Phil Taylor 118.66
(England) Ronnie Baxter	9–4	(England) Tony Eccles
(Australia) Simon Whitlock	9–4	(Scotland) Robert Thornton
(England) Michael Smith	6–9	(England) Mervyn King
(Scotland) Gary Anderson	9–7	(Australia) Paul Nicholson
(England) Steve Maish	1–9	(England) Wes Newton
(England) Kevin McDine	9–8	(England) Paul Warwick
(Wales) Wayne Atwood	6–9	(England) Nigel Heydon

==== Round 5 ====
Player #1	Score	Player #2
(England) Phil Taylor	9–6	(Australia) Simon Whitlock
(England) Ronnie Baxter	7–9	(England) Andy Hamilton
(England) Kevin McDine	2–9	(England) James Wade
(Scotland) Gary Anderson	9–8	(England) Mervyn King
(England) Andy Smith	1–9	(England) Denis Ovens
(England) Alan Tabern	5–9	(England) Tony Ayres
(England) Nigel Heydon	5–9	(England) Wes Newton
(England) Adrian Lewis	9–4	(England) Wayne Jones

=== Sunday 6 June ===
==== Last 8 to final ====
Quarter-finals; Best of 19 legs
(England) James Wade	9
(England) Tony Ayres	10
(Scotland) Gary Anderson	10
(England) Andy Hamilton	6
(England) Wes Newton	3
(England) Denis Ovens	10
(England) Phil Taylor	10
(England) Adrian Lewis	2

Semi-finals; Best of 19 legs
(England) Tony Ayres	3
(Scotland) Gary Anderson	10
(England) Denis Ovens	5
(England) Phil Taylor	10

Final; Best of 21 legs
(Scotland) Gary Anderson	5
(England) Phil Taylor	11

== Nine dart finish ==
Mervyn King hit a nine dart finish in his fourth round match against Gary Anderson, however he lost the match 9-8.

== World record ==
Phil Taylor hit the highest televised average in history in his 9-0 victory over Kevin Painter, finishing the match with a three-dart average of 118.66.

== See also ==
- UK Open history of event and previous winners
- 2010 in darts includes extended results of Pro Tour events
- PDC Pro Tour history of PDC "floor events"
