= 2012 PDPA Players Championship 9 =

The 2012 PDPA Players Championship 9 was one of a series of twenty knockout darts tournaments organised by the Professional Darts Corporation (PDC) that year within the PDC Pro Tour. The winner was the English player Dave Chisnall.

Second Round
1	(England) Justin Pipe	6
(England) Brian Woods	0
32	(England) Adrian Lewis	6
(South Africa) Devon Petersen	5
16	(England) Colin Osborne	4
(England) Reece Robinson	6
(England) Andy Jenkins	6
(England) Chris Aubrey	4
8	(England) Mervyn King	5
(Scotland) Robert Thornton	6
25	(England) Andy Hamilton	6
(England) Darren Johnson	2
9	(Wales) Mark Webster	6
(England) Steve Farmer	4
24	(Northern Ireland) Brendan Dolan	6
(England) Aaron Turner	2
5	(England) Ronnie Baxter	6
(England) Nick Fullwell	2
(England) Mark Hylton	6
(England) Adrian Gray	1
12	(England) Colin Lloyd	6
(England) Michael Barnard	4
21	(Netherlands) Vincent van der Voort	6
(England) Matthew Waddoups	2
4	(Australia) Simon Whitlock	6
(England) Mick Todd	1
29	(England) Denis Ovens	3
(Scotland) Jim Walker	6
13	(England) Terry Jenkins	6
(England) Kevin McDine	5
20	(Wales) Richie Burnett	6
(England) Dave Ladley	0
2	(England) Dave Chisnall	6
(England) Arron Monk	4
(England) Ted Hankey	6
(Netherlands) Roland Scholten	5
15	(England) Kevin Painter	5
(England) Stuart Kellett	6
(England) Joe Cullen	6
(England) Ian Moss	5
7	(Netherlands) Michael van Gerwen	6
(England) John Scott	2
26	(England) Ian White	6
(England) Mike Veitch	1
10	(Australia) Paul Nicholson	6
(England) Dean Winstanley	5
23	(England) Mark Walsh	6
(England) Damien Sherwood	2
6	(England) James Wade	6
(England) Andrew Gilding	5
27	(England) Andy Smith	6
(Netherlands) Mareno Michels	5
11	(Canada) John Part	6
(Scotland) John Henderson	2
(England) James Hubbard	6
(England) Daniel Day	2
3	(England) Wes Newton	5
(Republic of Ireland) William O'Connor	6
30	(England) Scott Rand	1
(England) Chris Thompson	6
14	(Belgium) Kim Huybrechts	4
(Wales) Gareth Pass	6
19	(Scotland) Peter Wright	6
(England) Darren Webster	3

Third Round
1	(England) Justin Pipe	2
32	(England) Adrian Lewis	6
(England) Reece Robinson	6
(England) Andy Jenkins	5
(Scotland) Robert Thornton	6
25	(England) Andy Hamilton	2
9	(Wales) Mark Webster	4
24	(Northern Ireland) Brendan Dolan	6
5	(England) Ronnie Baxter	6
(England) Mark Hylton	0
12	(England) Colin Lloyd	5
21	(Netherlands) Vincent van der Voort	6
4	(Australia) Simon Whitlock	6
(Scotland) Jim Walker	3
13	(England) Terry Jenkins	3
20	(Wales) Richie Burnett	6
2	(England) Dave Chisnall	6
(England) Ted Hankey	3
(England) Stuart Kellett	5
(England) Joe Cullen	6
7	(Netherlands) Michael van Gerwen	4
26	(England) Ian White	6
10	(Australia) Paul Nicholson	2
23	(England) Mark Walsh	6
6	(England) James Wade	6
27	(England) Andy Smith	3
11	(Canada) John Part	6
(England) James Hubbard	3
(Republic of Ireland) William O'Connor	6
(England) Chris Thompson	1
(Wales) Gareth Pass	4
19	(Scotland) Peter Wright	6

Fourth Round
32	(England) Adrian Lewis	6
(England) Reece Robinson	0
(Scotland) Robert Thornton	3
24	(Northern Ireland) Brendan Dolan	6
5	(England) Ronnie Baxter	6
21	(Netherlands) Vincent van der Voort	5
4	(Australia) Simon Whitlock	6
20	(Wales) Richie Burnett	2
2	(England) Dave Chisnall	6
(England) Joe Cullen	4
26	(England) Ian White	6
23	(England) Mark Walsh	2
6	(England) James Wade	6
11	(Canada) John Part	5
(Republic of Ireland) William O'Connor	3
19	(Scotland) Peter Wright	6

Quarter-Finals
32	(England) Adrian Lewis	6
24	(Northern Ireland) Brendan Dolan	4
5	(England) Ronnie Baxter	6
4	(Australia) Simon Whitlock	5
2	(England) Dave Chisnall	6
26	(England) Ian White	4
6	(England) James Wade	6
19	(Scotland) Peter Wright	5

Semi-Finals
32	(England) Adrian Lewis	5
5	(England) Ronnie Baxter	6
2	(England) Dave Chisnall	6
6	(England) James Wade	2

Final
5	(England) Ronnie Baxter	4
2	(England) Dave Chisnall	6
