= Barrie Bates =

Welsh darts player (born 1969)

Personal information
- Nicknames: "Champagne" "Batesy"
- Born: 17 October 1969 (age 57) Merthyr Tydfil, Wales
- Home town: Bedlinog, Taff Bargoed Valley, Wales

Sport
- Sport: Darts
- Playing since: 1997
- Darts: 23g Red Dragon Signature
- Laterality: Right-handed
- Walk-on music: "House of Fun" by Madness

Organisation (see split in darts)
- PDC: 2002–2022, 2024 (Tour Card: 2011–2012; 2019–2020)

PDC premier events – best performances
- World Championship: Quarter-final: 2009
- World Matchplay: Last 16: 2007
- World Grand Prix: Quarter-final: 2010
- UK Open: Runner-up: 2006
- Grand Slam: Group Stage: 2007, 2011, 2012
- Championship League: Initial groups, Semi-final: 2008
- Desert Classic: Last 16: 2006
- US Open/WSoD: Last 16: 2007
- PC Finals: Last 32: 2011

Other tournament wins
- Years
Le Skratch Montreal Open	2006
PDC Eastbourne Open	2006
Players Championships (2x)
2006, 2010

Barrie Bates (born 17 October 1969) is a Welsh former professional darts player who competed in Professional Darts Corporation (PDC) events. His original nickname was Batesy, but since 2007 he was known as Champagne.

== Career ==
Bates made his PDC televised debut at the 2003 UK Open reaching the third round. In 2005 he narrowly lost a last-32 match to Lionel Sams at the UK Open and made a superb run to the final in 2006 before losing to Raymond van Barneveld.

He made a great impression on the circuit in 2006, winning the John Smiths Singles in February and May's Le Skratch Sarantos Retsinas Memorial event in Montreal. He also reached two Regional Finals of the UK Open in March (losing to Chris Mason and to van Barneveld in November. He reached two PDPA Players Championship finals in 2006 losing to Colin Lloyd in the Isle of Wight in June, but beat Phil Taylor to take his biggest title to date in the Netherlands event in November.

His success at events away from the television cameras during 2006 helped him to win the award of "Best Floor Player" at the first PDC Awards Dinner. It refers to the non-televised events which feature many boards alongside each other on a smaller arena floor.

He made his World Championship debut in 2007 as the number 17 seed but suffered a surprise first-round defeat to Canadian Brian Cyr. In the 2008 World Championship, Bates got to the third round only to lose to Kirk Shepherd. In the 2009 tournament, Bates defeated Northern Ireland's Felix McBrearty and American Bill Davis to reach the third round again, this time meeting Mark Dudbridge, winning 4–0 with checkout percentage of 60% to reach the quarter-finals for the very first time. He lost in the quarters, however, falling to twelfth seed Mervyn King by five sets to two.

In 2010, he represented Wales in the inaugural PDC World Cup of Darts alongside Mark Webster, where despite losing all seven singles in which he competed in, he and Webster reached the final, after defeating New Zealand, Spain, Scotland and Australia (thanks to Bates's 116 checkout in the sudden death leg), before losing to the Netherlands pairing of Raymond van Barneveld and Co Stompé.

In January 2019, after several years struggling with injury and playing his darts on the PDC Challenge Tour, Bates won back his PDC Tour Card for the first time since 2012. He squeezed into the top eleven of the UK Q-School Order of Merit to seal a two-year Tour Card.

He participated in 2024 Q–School but failed to re-gain his Tour Card.

== World Championship results ==
=== PDC ===
- 2007: First round (lost to Brian Cyr 2–3) (sets)
- 2008: Third round (lost to Kirk Shepherd 2–4)
- 2009: Quarter-finals (lost to Mervyn King 2–5)
- 2010: Second round (lost to Kevin McDine 0–4)
- 2011: First round (lost to Kevin McDine 1–3)

== Career statistics ==
Performance Table Legend
W	Won the tournament	F	Finalist	SF	Semifinalist	QF	Quarterfinalist	#R; RR; Prel.	Lost in # round Round-robin; Preliminary round	DQ	Disqualified
DNQ	Did not qualify	DNP	Did not participate	WD	Withdrew	NH	Tournament not held	#R; RR; Prel.	Lost in # round Round-robin; Preliminary round	NYF	Not yet founded

=== Performance timeline ===
Tournament	2003	2004	2005	2006	2007	2008	2009	2010	2011	2012	2013	2014	2015	2016	2017	2018	2019	2020
PDC World Championship	DNQ				1R	3R	QF	2R	1R	DNQ								
UK Open	3R	3R	5R	F	4R	4R	3R	3R	1R	DNQ					3R	DNQ	1R	2R
World Matchplay	DNQ			1R	2R	DNQ		1R	DNQ									
World Grand Prix	DNQ			1R	1R	DNQ		QF	DNQ									
European Championship	Not held					DNQ		2R	DNQ									
Players Championship Finals	Not held						DNQ		1R	DNQ								
Non-ranked televised events
PDC World Cup of Darts	Not held							F	NH	DNP								
Grand Slam of Darts	Not held				RR	DNQ			RR	RR	DNQ							
Past major events
Las Vegas Desert Classic	DNQ			2R	DNQ	1R	DNQ	Not held										
International Darts League	DNP				RR	Not held												
Championship League Darts	Not held					RR	RR	DNQ			Not held							
US Open	Not held				5R	3R	Not held											
Career statistics
Year-end ranking	83	83	64	17	12	22	36	31	65	109	143	168	144	178	142	169	153	139

PDC European Tour

Tournament	2014	2015	2018
Austrian Open	1R	NH	DNQ
European Open	DNQ	1R	DNQ
Gibraltar Trophy	Did not qualify		1R
Dutch Championship	Did not qualify		2R

PDC Players Championships

Season	1	2	3	4	5	6	7	8	9	10	11	12	13	14	15	16	17	18	19	20	21	22	23	24	25	26	27	28	29	30	31	32	33	34	35	36	37
2004	BLA; DNP	NEW; DNP	DUB; 2R	ROT; DNP	EDI; 4R																																
2005	IOW; 3R	IOW; QF	BLA; 3R	NEW; 1R	DUB; 2R	IRV; 3R	LIS; 2R	LIS; 2R																													
2006	GIB; 2R	HAI; F	HAI; 2R	BLA; 2R	NEW; 4R	DUB; 3R	IRV; 1R	LIS; 4R	LIS; W																												
2007	GIB; 4R	GIB; 1R	BAD; 4R	ANT; 4R	SCH; SF	HEE; 4R	HAI; 4R	HAI; QF	LVE; QF	BLA; QF	ATL; DNP	CAS; DNP	CHI; DNP	NEW; 3R	DUB; 2R	IRV; 3R	KIR; 3R	KIL; 4R	LIS; 3R	LIS; 3R																	
2008	GIB; DNP		ESS; 3R	WIG; 2R	BAD; 3R	BAD; 2R	TEL; 3R	TEM; 1R	GLA; 3R	AMS; 2R	BRI; 3R	BRI; 2R	LVE; 3R	BLA; 3R	NSW; DNP	KIT; 3R	ATL; 4R	EIN; 3R	EIN; 1R	DRO; 3R	CHI; 3R	NEW; QF	NEW; 3R	DUB; 3R	DUB; 3R	IRV; 2R	IRV; 3R	KIR; 2R	KIL; SF	LEI; 3R	LEI; 1R						
2009	DON; 1R	GIB; 1R	GIB; 4R	GLA; 3R	GLA; 1R	IRV; PR	WIG; 2R	BRE; 1R	COV; 2R	NUL; 2R	NUL; 2R	TAU; 2R	DER; 3R	NEW; 2R	BAR; 4R	BAR; 2R	DIN; 4R	DIN; 1R	LVE; 3R	SYD; DNP	ONT; 3R	ATL; 3R	ATL; 3R	SAL; 2R	SAL; 3R	DUB; 1R	DUB; 2R	KIL; 2R	NUL; 2R	NUL; 3R	IRV; 3R	IRV; 1R					
2010	GIB; 1R	GIB; 2R	SWI; 1R	DER; 2R	GLA; 3R	GLA; 3R	WIG; 1R	CRA; W	BAR; QF	DER; 1R	WIG; QF	WIG; 3R	SAL; 4R	SAL; 4R	BAR; 1R	BAR; 2R	HAA; 2R	HAA; 2R	LVE; 4R	LVE; 3R	LVE; 3R	SYD; DNP	ONT; 3R	ONT; 4R	CRA; 1R	CRA; 1R	NUL; 1R	NUL; 1R	DUB; 1R	DUB; 4R	KIL; QF	BAD; 1R	BAD; 2R	BAR; 1R	BAR; 1R	DER; 2R	DER; 3R
2011	HAL; 2R	HAL; 2R	DER; 1R	DER; 3R	CRA; 1R	CRA; 2R	VIE; 2R	VIE; 1R	CRA; 1R	CRA; 1R	BAR; 2R	BAR; 1R	NUL; 1R	NUL; 1R	ONT; 2R	ONT; 2R	DER; 1R	DER; 2R	NUL; 1R	NUL; 1R	DUB; 1R	DUB; 1R	KIL; 1R	GLA; 1R	GLA; 1R	ALI; 1R	ALI; 1R	CRA; 1R	CRA; 2R	WIG; 2R	WIG; 1R						
2012	ALI; 1R	ALI; 2R	REA; 1R	REA; 1R	CRA; 1R	CRA; 1R	BIR; 1R	BIR; 1R	CRA; 1R	CRA; 1R	BAR; 3R	BAR; 1R	DUB; 2R	DUB; 1R	KIL; 1R	KIL; 1R	CRA; 1R	CRA; 2R	BAR; 1R	BAR; 1R																	
2013 (Note: Not a Tour card holder)	BAR; DNP		WIG; 2R	WIG; 1R	DNP				DUB; PR	DUB; 1R	KIL; 2R	KIL; PR	WIG; 1R	WIG; 2R	BAR; DNP																						
2014	Did not participate																																				
2015	Did not participate					COV; 3R	COV; 3R	COV; 1R	CRA; 1R	CRA; 1R	BAR; 1R	BAR; 1R	WIG; 1R	WIG; 1R	BAR; 1R	BAR; 1R	DUB; 2R	DUB; 1R	COV; 1R	COV; DNP																	
2016	Did not participate					BAR; 1R	Did not participate							BAR; 2R	BAR; DNP	BAR; 3R	DNP																				
2017	Did not participate														BAR; 1R	BAR; 2R	DNP				BAR; 2R	BAR; 1R															
2018	Did not participate																BAR; 1R	Did not participate																			
2019	WIG; 2R	WIG; 1R	WIG; 2R	WIG; 2R	BAR; 1R	BAR; 2R	WIG; 1R	WIG; 1R	BAR; 1R	BAR; 1R	BAR; 1R	BAR; 1R	BAR; 1R	BAR; 1R	BAR; 2R	BAR; 1R	WIG; 2R	WIG; 2R	BAR; 3R	BAR; 1R	HIL; 2R	HIL; 1R	BAR; 1R	BAR; 1R	BAR; 1R	BAR; 1R	DUB; 2R	DUB; 1R	BAR; 1R	BAR; 3R							
2020	BAR; 2R	BAR; 2R	WIG; 1R	WIG; 1R	WIG; 1R	WIG; 1R	BAR; 1R	BAR; 1R	MIL; 1R	MIL; 1R	MIL; 1R	MIL; 1R	MIL; 1R	NIE; 1R	NIE; 1R	NIE; 1R	NIE; 1R	NIE; 1R	COV; 1R	COV; 1R	COV; 1R	COV; 1R	COV; 1R														

PDC Challenge Tour

Season	1	2	3	4	5	6	7	8	9	10	11	12	13	14	15	16	17	18	19	20	21	22	23	24	Prize money	Ranking
2014	WIG; PR	WIG; L128	REA; L128	REA; L64	WIG; L64	WIG; L64	COV; L128	COV; L128	WIG; L64	WIG; L128	COV; L128	COV; L32	COV; L128	COV; L128	WIG; L64	WIG; L128									£350	95th
2015	WIG; L128	WIG; L128	WIG; L256	WIG; L256	WIG; L32	WIG; L256	WIG; L256	WIG; L128	WIG; DNP				COV; L128	COV; L16	COV; L128	COV; L128									£300	113th
2016	WIG; L128	WIG; L64	WIG; L32	WIG; L64	WIG; L256	WIG; L32	WIG; L32	WIG; L128	MIL; L128	MIL; L128	MIL; QF	MIL; SF	WIG; L32	WIG; QF	WIG; L128	WIG; F									£2600	14th
2017	MIL; QF	MIL; L256	MIL; L16	MIL; L64	BAR; L32	BAR; L128	BAR; L64	BAR; L16	MIL; L128	MIL; L64	MIL; L128	MIL; L16	MIL; L64	MIL; PR	MIL; L32	MIL; F	WIG; L128	WIG; L16	WIG; L64	WIG; L128					£2550	21st
2018	WIG; L64	WIG; L128	WIG; L256	WIG; L128	MIL; L64	MIL; L64	MIL; L16	MIL; L256	WIG; L256	WIG; L128	WIG; SF	WIG; L128	WIG; DNP		WIG; QF	WIG; QF	PET; L128	PET; L128	PET; L64	PET; L64					£1550	39th
2021; UK	MIL; L64	MIL; L32	MIL; L256	MIL; L32	MIL; L256	MIL; L256	MIL; L64	MIL; L256	MIL; L64	MIL; L64	MIL; L64	MIL; L256													£450	78th
2022	MIL; L128	MIL; L256	MIL; L16	MIL; L128	MIL; L128	HIL; Did not participate										LEI; Did not participate									£200	196th

Performance Table Legend
W	Won the tournament	F	Finalist	SF	Semifinalist	QF	Quarterfinalist	#R; RR; Prel.	Lost in # round Round-robin; Preliminary round	DQ	Disqualified
DNQ	Did not qualify	DNP	Did not participate	WD	Withdrew	NH	Tournament not held	#R; RR; Prel.	Lost in # round Round-robin; Preliminary round	NYF	Not yet founded

=== PDC major finals: 1 ===
Outcome	No.	Year	Championship	Opponent in the final	Score (Note: (l) = score in legs, (s) = score in sets, (p) = score in points.)
Runner-up	1.	2006	UK Open	Raymond van Barneveld	7–13 (l)

=== PDC team finals: 1 ===
Outcome	No.	Year	Championship	Team	Teammate	Opponents in the final	Score
Runner-up	1.	2010	World Cup of Darts	Wales	Mark Webster	Netherlands – Raymond van Barneveld and Co Stompé	2–4 (p)
