= 2007 US Open (darts) =

Darts tournament in Connecticut, United States

The 2007 US Open was a darts tournament, organised by the Professional Darts Corporation (PDC). It was the inaugural event and played in Connecticut between May 18 and May 20.

The tournament replaced the World Series of Darts which ran for one year and was cancelled as a result of poor television ratings on ESPN. The first US Open was held at the Mohegan Sun Casino Resort, Connecticut, USA – which was the venue used for the 2006 World Series of Darts.

Phil Taylor added to his list of titles by winning the event – beating Raymond van Barneveld in the final.

== Television coverage and format ==
The tournament was broadcast live in the UK on satellite station Challenge. The coverage was hosted by Sarah Cawood and Tony Green, who was broadcasting from a PDC tournament for the first time. Limited coverage of the event was shown on US sport channel Versus.

The format saw 32 boards in action on Friday Night, for "Friday Night Madness" where a minimum of 16 American players progressed to the final stages. On Saturday, the 16 US qualifiers join the top 64 in the PDC Order of Merit (who have entered). Matches were the best of five sets, with three legs per set. The players were whittled down to sixteen for the final stages on Sunday.

== Results ==
The first four rounds were played on Saturday May 19 over the best of five sets (best of three legs per set).

=== Last 32 ===
Fourth round best of 5 sets losers £2,000; Sat 19 May
1	(England) Phil Taylor	3
32	(England) Matt Clark	0
16	(England) Kevin Painter	3
48	(Netherlands) Michael van Gerwen	2
57	(England) Mervyn King	3
25	(England) Alan Warriner-Little	2
9	(England) Wayne Mardle	3
24	(England) Andy Smith	1
60	(England) Martyn Turner	1
28	(Republic of Ireland) Mick McGowan	3
12	(Canada) John Part	3
21	(England) Wes Newton	1
4	(England) Peter Manley	3
29	(England) Lionel Sams	2
13	(England) Ronnie Baxter	3
(United States) Chris Linkous	2
2	(Netherlands) Raymond van Barneveld	3
34	(England) Steve Hine	1
15	(Wales) Barrie Bates	3
47	(England) Mark Holden	0
7	(Netherlands) Roland Scholten	3
39	(Canada) Gerry Convery	1
55	(Netherlands) Vincent van der Voort	2
23	(England) Wayne Jones	3
6	(England) Dennis Priestley	3
38	(United States) Ray Carver	0
11	(England) Andy Hamilton	3
43	(England) Steve Smith	2
(United States) Jim Widmayer	3
(United States) Brian Blake	1
(United States) Fred Krueger	1
19	(England) Mark Dudbridge	3

Fifth round best of 5 sets losers £3,000; Sun 20 May
1	(England) Taylor	3
16	(England) Painter	2
57	(England) King	3
9	(England) Mardle	2
28	(Republic of Ireland) McGowan	0
12	(Canada) Part	3
4	(England) Manley	0
13	(England) Baxter	3
2	(Netherlands) v Barneveld	3
15	(Wales) Bates	0
7	(Netherlands) Scholten	3
23	(England) Jones	1
6	(England) Priestley	1
11	(England) Hamilton	3
(United States) Widmayer	1
19	(England) Dudbridge	3

Quarter-finals best of 5 sets losers £4,000; Sun 20 May
1	(England) Taylor	3
57	(England) King	0
12	(Canada) Part	3
13	(England) Baxter	0
2	(Netherlands) v Barneveld	3
7	(Netherlands) Scholten	0
11	(England) Hamilton	3
19	(England) Dudbridge	0

Semi-finals best of 5 sets losers £5,000; Sun 20 May
1	(England) Taylor	3
12	(Canada) Part	1
2	(Netherlands) v Barneveld	3
11	(England) Hamilton	1

Final best of 7 sets runner-up £7,500 winner £12,500; Sun 20 May
1	(England) Phil Taylor	4
2	(Netherlands) Raymond van Barneveld	1

== Prize fund ==
Total Prize Fund £126,000

- Winner: £12,500
- Runner-up: £7,500
- Semi-finalists: £5,000
- Quarter-finalists: £4,000
- Last 16: £3,000
- Last 32: £1,500
- Last 64: £1,000
