= Steve Hine =

English darts player (born 1969)

Personal information
- Nickname: "The Muffin Man"
- Born: 20 April 1969 (age 57) Coventry, Warwickshire, England

Sport
- Sport: Darts
- Playing since: 1986
- Darts: 23g Loxley Darts Signature
- Laterality: Right-handed
- Walk-on music: "No Limit" by 2 Unlimited

Organisation (see split in darts)
- PDC: 2004– (Tour Card: 2011–2012, 2014-2015, 2017-2018)
- WDF: 2020–

WDF major events – best performances
- World Championship: Last 16: 2022

PDC premier events – best performances
- World Championship: Last 32: 2010
- World Matchplay: Last 32: 2006
- World Grand Prix: Last 32: 2005
- UK Open: Quarter-final: 2007
- Grand Slam: Group Stage: 2018
- Desert Classic: Last 32: 2005
- US Open/WSoD: Last 32: 2007
- PC Finals: Last 32: 2010, 2017

Other tournament wins
- Years
LPKD The Hasbury Inn	2011
Concierge UK Seniors Tour 2	2025
UK Open Regionals/Qualifiers
UK Open Regional (NEE)	2005

Stephen Hine (born 20 April 1969) is an English professional darts player who has competed in Professional Darts Corporation (PDC) and World Darts Federation (WDF) events. A baker by profession, he is nicknamed "The Muffin Man" and is known for distributing muffins to spectators during his walk-on. His best results at major championships include reaching the quarter-finals of the 2007 UK Open and the last 16 of the 2022 WDF World Darts Championship.

== Darts career ==
=== PDC ===
Hine began competing in PDC events in 2004 and claimed his first ranking title in January 2005, winning a regional qualifier for the 2005 UK Open in the North East of England. He made his debut at the PDC World Darts Championship in 2006, losing 3–1 to Chris Mason in the opening round.

His best performance at a PDC major came at the 2007 UK Open, where he defeated Alan Tabern 11–1, Adrian Gray 11–6 and Colin Monk 11–8 to reach the quarter-finals. He was subsequently eliminated by Colin Lloyd, losing 6–11.

After another first-round defeat at the 2008 PDC World Darts Championship, this time against Mark Dudbridge, Hine returned to the tournament in 2010. He defeated 32nd seed Roland Scholten 3–2 to record his first victory at the World Championship, before losing 4–0 to Phil Taylor in the second round. At the 2011 World Championship, he won the opening set against Raymond van Barneveld but eventually lost 3–1.

Following his appearance in the second round of the 2010 World Championship, Hine secured a PDC Tour Card for the 2011 and 2012 seasons. He subsequently regained his Tour Card through PDC Qualifying School in 2014, allowing him to compete on the professional circuit in 2014 and 2015. During this period, he reached three last-16 stages on the PDC Pro Tour, but did not qualify for another televised major championship.

Hine regained his Tour Card once again at the 2017 Q-School. Later that year, he qualified for the 2017 Players Championship Finals, where he produced one of his most notable victories by defeating world number three Peter Wright 6–5 in the first round, averaging 97.10. His run ended in the second round following a 6–5 defeat to Peter Jacques.

In March 2018, Hine achieved a nine-dart finish during a Players Championship event in Milton Keynes against John Henderson. He also reached a Players Championship quarter-final earlier in the season, losing to Gary Anderson.

In November 2018, Hine qualified for the 2018 Grand Slam of Darts through the PDC qualifying tournament, defeating Arron Monk 5–3 in his decisive match. Making his debut at the event, he was drawn into Group D alongside Gary Anderson, Ian White and Michael Unterbuchner. He lost all three group matches and was eliminated without progressing to the knockout stage.

Hine finished the 2018 season outside the top 64 of the PDC Order of Merit and lost his Tour Card. He failed to regain it at the 2019 Q-School and subsequently returned to the PDC Challenge Tour. He reached a quarter-final during the 2019 season and a semi-final in 2021, while also beginning to compete in BDO and WDF tournaments.

Hine continued competing on the Challenge Tour in subsequent seasons. In 2026, he reached the quarter-finals of Event Five in Milton Keynes, where he lost 5–3 to Jack Tweddell. He achieved another quarter-final at Event 12 in Hildesheim, losing 5–2 to Andy Courtney. He finished the season in 72nd place on the Challenge Tour Order of Merit with £2,000 in prize money.

=== BDO and WDF ===
Following the loss of his PDC Tour Card, Hine began participating in British Darts Organisation (BDO) and WDF events in 2019. He reached the quarter-finals of the England Classic, the last 16 of the British Classic and the final of the Northern Cyprus Masters, where he lost to Simon Stainton.

In February 2020, Hine reached the final of the Scottish Open. He defeated Jason Heaver 5–1 in the quarter-finals and three-time world champion Martin Adams by the same score in the semi-finals, before losing 6–2 to Jim Williams in the final.

Hine continued competing in WDF tournaments in 2021, reaching the quarter-finals of the British Classic, where he was defeated 4–2 by Jim McEwan. His performances on the WDF circuit earned him qualification for the 2022 WDF World Darts Championship at Lakeside.

At the 2022 WDF World Championship, Hine defeated American Kevin Luke 2–0 in the first round before recording a 3–0 victory over another American, Leonard Gates, in the second round. He reached the last 16, where he won the opening set against second seed Thibault Tricole but eventually lost the match 3–1. Tricole went on to finish as runner-up in the tournament.

In September 2024, Hine partnered Jenson Walker to win the men's pairs competition at the British Open in Bridlington. The pair defeated Charlie Manby and Lewis Gurney 3–2 in the final.

=== Seniors darts ===
Hine also competed on the World Seniors Darts Tour (WSDT), including appearances in qualifying and open events during the 2022–23 season. In January 2023, he reached the last 16 of the LP Metal Detecting Open Series 2.

In 2025, Hine participated in the newly established UK Seniors Tour, a separate competition from the World Seniors Darts Tour. He won the third event of its inaugural weekend in Coventry in April, defeating William Mann 5–4 in the final with a three-dart average of 92.46.

Hine claimed another title on the UK Concierge Seniors Tour in September 2025 at Okehampton. After defeating Rod Hawkins, Dave Dudeney, Paul Hogan and Simon Stevenson, he beat Andy Steed 5–2 in the final.

== Outside darts ==
Hine supports Coventry City F.C. and the Coventry Bees speedway team.

== World Championship results ==
=== PDC ===
- 2006: First round (lost to Chris Mason 1–3)
- 2008: First round (lost to Mark Dudbridge 1–3)
- 2010: Second round (lost to Phil Taylor 0–4)
- 2011: First round (lost to Raymond van Barneveld 1–3)

=== WDF ===
- 2022: Third round (lost to Thibault Tricole 1–3)

== Performance timeline ==
=== WDF ===
Tournament	2022
WDF Ranked major events
World Championship	3R

=== PDC ===
Tournament	2004	2005	2006	2007	2008	2009	2010	2011		2012	2013	2014	2015	2016	2017	2018
PDC Ranked televised events
World Championship	DNQ		1R	DNQ	1R	DNQ	2R	1R		Did not qualify						
UK Open	2R	4R	3R	QF	2R	3R	3R	1R		1R	PR	2R	1R	DNQ		
World Matchplay	DNQ		1R	Did not qualify												
World Grand Prix	DNQ	1R	Did not qualify													
Players Championship Finals	Not held					DNQ	1R	DNQ	DNQ	Did not qualify					2R	DNQ
PDC Non-ranked televised events
Grand Slam	NH			Did not qualify												RR
PDC Past major events
Las Vegas Desert Classic	DNQ	1R	Did not qualify				Not held									
US Open	Not held			1R	Did not qualify			Not held								
Career statistics
Year-end ranking	–	–	40	–	–	53	41	47		61	113	104	88	104	99	88

==== PDC European Tour ====
Season	1	2	3	4	5	6	7	8	9	10	11	12	13
2012	Did not qualify				DDM; 1R								
2013	DNQ	EDT; 1R	DNQ	ADO; 1R	DNQ			DDM; 1R					
2014	DNQ		GDM; 1R	DNQ			EDGP; 2R	DNQ					
2015	Did not qualify												
2016	Did not qualify						DNP	DNQ		GDC; 1R			
2017	Did not qualify										DNP	DNQ	
2018	Did not qualify				EDGP; 1R	Did not qualify							

==== PDC Players Championships ====
Season	1	2	3	4	5	6	7	8	9	10	11	12	13	14	15	16	17	18	19	20	21	22	23	24	25	26	27	28	29	30	31	32	33	34	35	36	37
2004	DNP		DUB; 1R	DNP	EDI; 2R																																
2005	IOW; 1R	IOW; 2R	DNP	NEW; 1R	DUB; 3R	IRV; 1R	LIS; 2R	LIS; 1R																													
2006	GIB; 2R	DNP		BLA; 4R	NEW; 3R	DUB; 2R	IRV; 1R	LIS; 4R	LIS; 4R																												
2007	DNP			ANT; 1R	HEN; 1R	HEE; 3R	HAY; 1R	HAY; 2R	LAS; 2R	BLA; 3R	DNP	DUB; 1R	DNP	NEW; 1R	DUB; 1R	IRV; 2R	DNP		LIS; 3R	LIS; 3R																	
2008	GIB; 1R	GIB; 3R	BRE; 4R	WIG; 2R	DNP		TEL; 1R	DNP	GLA; 2R	DNP	BRI; 1R	BRI; 4R	LAS; 3R	BLA; 3R	DNP			VEL; 2R	VEL; 1R	DNP		NEW; 1R	NEW; 2R	DNP		IRV; 1R	IRV; 1R	DNP		LEI; 1R	LEI; 4R						
2009	DON; 1R	GIB; 3R	GIB; 4R	DNP		IRV; QF	WIG; 1R	BRE; QF	COV; QF	NUL; 2R	NUL; 2R	TAU; 4R	DER; 2R	NEW; QF	BAR; 2R	BAR; 1R	DIN; 2R	DIN; 3R	LAS; 2R	SYD; 4R	CAN; 2R	ATL; 2R	SAL; 1R	SAL; 2R	DUB; 1R	DUB; 4R	KIL; 3R	NUL; 4R	NUL; 3R	IRV; 1R	IRV; 4R						
2010	GIB; 1R	GIB; 1R	SWI; 4R	DER; 2R	GLA; 1R	GLA; 4R	WIG; 2R	CRA; 3R	BAR; 3R	DER; 4R	WIG; 2R	WIG; 1R	SAL; 2R	SAL; QF	BAR; 1R	BAR; 3R	HAA; 1R	HAA; 2R	ATL; 4R	LAS; 2R	LAS; 2R	SYD; 3R	CAN; 2R	CAN; 3R	CRA; 2R	CRA; 3R	NUL; 3R	NUL; 4R	DUB; 2R	DUB; 1R	KIL; 3R	BNA; 4R	BNA; 3R	BAR; 1R	BAR; 2R	DER; 3R	DER; 1R
2011	HAL; 2R	HAL; 4R	DER; 2R	DER; 1R	CRA; 1R	CRA; 1R	WNE; 2R	WNE; 1R	CRA; 3R	CRA; 3R	BAR; 4R	BAR; 2R	NUL; 1R	NUL; 2R	CAN; 3R	CAN; 3R	DER; 1R	DER; 1R	NUL; 2R	NUL; 2R	DUB; 2R	DUB; 1R	KIL; 1R	GLA; 2R	GLA; 2R	BEN; 3R	BEN; 2R	CRA; 2R	CRA; 1R	WIG; 1R	WIG; 1R						
2012	BEN; 1R	BEN; 1R	REA; 1R	REA; 1R	CRA; 1R	CRA; 2R	BIR; 2R	BIR; 1R	CRA; 1R	CRA; 2R	BAR; 2R	BAR; 4R	DUB; 1R	DUB; 2R	KIL; 4R	KIL; 4R	CRA; 4R	CRA; 1R	BAR; 1R	BAR; 1R																	
2013 (Note: Not a Tour card holder)	WIG; 1R	WIG; 1R	WIG; 1R	WIG; 2R	CRA; 1R	CRA; 2R	BAR; 1R	BAR; 1R	DUB; 3R	DUB; 2R	KIL; 3R	KIL; 2R	WIG; 2R	WIG; 1R	BAR; 1R	BAR; 2R																					
2014	BAR; 1R	BAR; 1R	CRA; 2R	CRA; 1R	WIG; 1R	WIG; 1R	WIG; 2R	WIG; 1R	CRA; 1R	CRA; 1R	COV; 1R	COV; 2R	CRA; 4R	CRA; 1R	DUB; 1R	DUB; 1R	CRA; 1R	CRA; 2R	COV; 1R	COV; 2R																	
2015	BAR; 2R	BAR; 1R	BAR; 1R	BAR; 1R	BAR; 4R	COV; 2R	COV; 1R	COV; 1R	CRA; 1R	CRA; 1R	BAR; 2R	BAR; 1R	WIG; 1R	WIG; 2R	BAR; 1R	BAR; 2R	DUB; 2R	DUB; 1R	COV; 2R	COV; 1R																	
2016	BAR; 1R	BAR; 2R	BAR; 3R	BAR; 1R	BAR; 2R	BAR; 2R	BAR; 1R	COV; 1R	COV; 2R	BAR; 1R	BAR; 2R	BAR; 1R	BAR; 3R	BAR; 2R	BAR; 1R	BAR; 1R	DUB; 1R	DUB; 2R	BAR; 2R	BAR; 2R																	
2017	BAR; 2R	BAR; 2R	BAR; 3R	BAR; 4R	MIL; 3R	MIL; 3R	BAR; 1R	BAR; 1R	WIG; 1R	WIG; 1R	MIL; 3R	MIL; 1R	WIG; 2R	WIG; 3R	BAR; 3R	BAR; 1R	BAR; 1R	BAR; 1R	DUB; 2R	DUB; 2R	BAR; 1R	BAR; 1R															
2018	BAR; 1R	BAR; 1R	BAR; QF	BAR; 1R	MIL; 1R	MIL; 1R	BAR; 1R	BAR; 1R	WIG; 1R	WIG; 2R	MIL; 2R	MIL; 1R	WIG; 1R	WIG; 3R	BAR; 1R	BAR; 1R	BAR; 1R	BAR; 1R	DUB; 1R	DUB; 1R	BAR; 1R	BAR; 1R															

==== PDC Challenge Tour ====
Season	1	2	3	4	5	6	7	8	9	10	11	12	13	14	15	16	17	18	19	20	21	22	23	24	Prize money	Ranking
2016	WIG; L512	WIG; L512	WIG; L32	WIG; L64	WIG; L32	WIG; L32	WIG; L32	WIG; L256	COV; QF	COV; L64	COV; L64	COV; L256	WIG; L256	WIG; L64	DNP										£900	50th
2019	WIG; L32	WIG; L128	WIG; L256	WIG; L32	WIG; L128	WIG; L256	WIG; L64	WIG; L64	PET; L16	PET; L32	PET; L256	PET; L256	WOL; L64	WOL; L32	WOL; L16	WOL; QF	WIG; L256	WIG; L256	WIG; L256	WIG; L128					£1,250	42nd
2020	WIG; L256	WIG; L512	WIG; L128	WIG; L16	BAR; L128	BAR; L128	BAR; L128	BAR; L64	BAR; L128	BAR; L64															£300	87th
2021 (UK)	MIL; L128	MIL; L32	MIL; L64	MIL; L16	MIL; L64	MIL; L128	MIL; SF	MIL; L128	MIL; L128	MIL; L32	MIL; L64	MIL; L64													£1,100	36th
2022	MIL; L32	MIL; L128	MIL; L16	MIL; L256	MIL; L256	Did not participate															LEI; L64	LEI; L256	LEI; L128	LEI; L64	£400	132nd
2023	MIL; L256	MIL; L256	MIL; L256	MIL; QF	MIL; L32	Did not participate				MIL; L32	MIL; L64	MIL; L128	MIL; L128	MIL; L128	MIL; L256	MIL; L64	MIL; L128	MIL; L256	MIL; L32	WIG; L32	WIG; L256	WIG; L32	WIG; L256	WIG; L128	£1,650	61st
2024	MIL; L256	MIL; L512	MIL; L64	MIL; L256	MIL; L256	HIL; L256	HIL; L256	HIL; L256	HIL; L64	HIL; L256	Did not participate					MIL; L128	MIL; L32	MIL; L128	DNP	MIL; L32	Did not participate				£550	150th
2025	MIL; L32	MIL; L512	MIL; L32	MIL; L128	MIL; L256	HIL; L256	HIL; L256	HIL; L256	HIL; L256	HIL; L128	MIL; L256	MIL; L64	MIL; L64	MIL; L128	MIL; L64	LEI; L128	Did not participate								£625	140th
2026	MIL; L256	MIL; L512	MIL; L128	MIL; L512	MIL; QF	LEI; L128	LEI; L128	LEI; L64	LEI; L256	LEI; L64	HIL; L128	HIL; QF	HIL; L256	HIL; L64	HIL; L128	MIL; L256	MIL; L256	MIL; L64	MIL; L128	MIL; L256	DNP		WIG; L256	WIG; L64	£2,000	72nd

Performance Table Legend
W	Won the tournament	F	Finalist	SF	Semifinalist	QF	Quarterfinalist	#R; RR; Prel.	Lost in # round Round-robin; Preliminary round	DQ	Disqualified
DNQ	Did not qualify	DNP	Did not participate	WD	Withdrew	NH	Tournament not held	#R; RR; Prel.	Lost in # round Round-robin; Preliminary round	NYF	Not yet founded
