= Kirk Shepherd =

English darts player (born 1986)

Personal information
- Nicknames: "Chaos" "The Karate Kid" "The Martial Dartist"
- Born: 5 October 1986 (age 40) Ramsgate, England
- Home town: Swindon, England

Sport
- Sport: Darts
- Playing since: 1999
- Darts: 21g Unicorn
- Laterality: Right-handed
- Walk-on music: "20th Century Boy" by T-Rex

Organisation (see split in darts)
- BDO: 2003–2006
- PDC: 2006–2022 (Tour Card: 2011–2014, 2017-2022)

WDF major events – best performances
- World Masters: Last 64: 2005

PDC premier events – best performances
- World Championship: Runner-up: 2008
- UK Open: Last 32: 2011, 2013, 2017
- Grand Slam: Last 16: 2009
- Championship League: Initial groups, 6th, 2008

Other tournament wins
- Years
British Teenage Open	2004, 2006
Hampshire Open	2007
LPKD Day of Darts	2010
LPKD Red Lion Erdington	2010
LPKD The Pint Pot	2010
Newark Open	2010
PDC Challenge Tour	2015
World Youth Masters	2003

Kirk Shepherd (born 5 October 1986) is an English former professional darts player who competed in Professional Darts Corporation (PDC) tournaments. He is best known for finishing as runner-up in the 2008 PDC World Darts Championship after starting the tournament as a 1000/1 outsider.

== Career ==
=== BDO career ===
Shepherd won the World Youth Masters in 2003, the British Teenage Singles Champion in 2004 and 2006 and was twice voted British Darts Organisation (BDO) Young Player of the Year in 2005 and 2006. At the age of just 18, he reached the final of the BDO Gold Cup in 2005. In 2006, he reached the quarter finals of the England Open, before switching from the BDO circuit to join the Professional Darts Corporation (PDC) in November 2006.

=== PDC career ===
Shepherd's first 12 months in the PDC were not particularly successful – with just a couple of last 32 placings in the non-televised Pro Tour events and reached only 142 in the PDC World Rankings by the time of the qualifying rounds for the 2008 World Championship. Shepherd then qualified at the last chance PDPA qualifier to earn a place at the tournament proper at the Alexandra Palace.

He then produced a series of major upsets at the 2008 World Championship (despite failing to achieve a three-dart average of over 90 at any stage of the competition), beating Terry Jenkins in the first round, then Mick McGowan and Barrie Bates and three-times former finalist Peter Manley to reach the semi-finals. Jenkins missed seven darts to beat him, McGowan missed four darts and Manley missed two darts to end his run, but he continued to progress. He then defeated Wayne Mardle, who had been installed as tournament favourite after his upset victory over Phil Taylor in the previous round, 6–4 in the semi-final and met John Part in the final on New Year's Day, when he scored the lowest average by a finalist in the PDC World Championship during his 2–7 loss. Shepherd is still the only darts player in PDC history to not score a three-dart average of above 90 in any round of a single World Championship and reach the final. He collected the runners-up cheque for £50,000 – his previous career earnings had been £16,970. Shepherd qualified for the Grand Slam of Darts in 2008 and his world ranking jumped from 173 at the start of 2007 to 22nd at the start of 2008. After the match, he quit his job where he had worked in a factory.

Shepherd was unable to continue his form throughout 2008, losing out in the last 64 in the UK Open and failing to qualify for the Las Vegas Desert Classic and the 2008 World Matchplay championship. Shepherd did play in the 2008 Grand Slam in November but lost all three of his group games, losing 5–1 to Raymond van Barneveld and 5–0 to Gary Mawson before narrowly losing 5–4 to Robert Thornton.

Shepherd entered the 2009 World Championship as the number 23 seed and faced Jan van der Rassel in the first round, losing 3–2 in a tie-break.

In August 2009, Shepherd reached the quarter-finals in the US Open for the very first time. This was followed up in November 2009 by winning two of his three group games in the 2009 Grand Slam of Darts to reach the second round, where he lost 5–10 to Kevin Painter.

In March 2010, Shepherd reached the quarter-finals of Players Championship 7 at the Robin Park Tennis Centre in Wigan. He lost 0–6 to Colin Lloyd.

In September 2011, Shepherd reached the quarter finals of the Players Championship 18 at the Moorways Centre in Derby. He lost 1–6 to Paul Nicholson.

In February 2013, he was ranked seven of the nine Tour Card winners from the Q School Order of Merit.

In 2015, Shepherd competed in the PDC Challenge Tour which is open to all PDPA Associate Members who failed to win a Tour Card at Qualifying School. He reached two finals, winning 5–3 against Jack Tweddel in March and losing 2–5 against Martin Lukeman in September.

In 2017, Shepherd entered qualifying school and earned a tour card on day four. His best result on the Pro Tour was a quarter-final in the 13th players championship event.

Shepherd lost his tour card at the end of 2018 and returned to Q school in the 2019 edition, where on the first day he made it to the final but was beaten by Jamie Hughes 5–2. On the second day he failed to win a match. On the third day he won one game. He won the fourth and final day by beating Painter 5–2 to retain his tour card for the 2019–2020 seasons. This also means he was guaranteed a spot for the 2019 and 2020 editions of the UK Open.

On 14 February 2021, Shepherd managed to regain his tour card beating Jack Main 6–1 in the final of the first day of 2021 PDC UK Qualifying School.

On 5 January 2022, he handed in his tour card due to problems with dartitis.

== Personal life ==
Shepherd became a father to a son, Callum, in early 2009. In June 2011, Shepherd became a father for the second time to son Jack, and another son, Alfie, in February 2017.

Shepherd is a Second Dan black belt at karate, thus providing two of his nicknames, "The Karate Kid" and "The Martial Dartist".

== World Championship results ==
=== PDC ===
- 2008: Runner-up (lost to John Part 2–7)
- 2009: 1st round (lost to Jan van der Rassel 2–3)
- 2010: 3rd round (lost to Mark Webster 1–4)
- 2011: 1st round (lost to Wayne Jones 1–3)

== Career finals ==
=== PDC premier event finals: 1 ===
Outcome	No.	Year	Championship	Opponent in the final	Score (Note: (l) = score in legs, (s) = score in sets.)
Runner-up	1.	2008	World Championship	John Part	2–7 (s)

== Performance timeline ==
=== BDO ===
Tournament	2004	2005	2006
World Masters	2R	3R	2R

=== PDC ===
Tournament	2007	2008	2009	2010	2011	2012	2013	2014	2015	2016	2017	2018	2019	2020	2021
PDC Ranked televised events
PDC World Championship	DNQ	F	1R	3R	1R	Did not qualify									
UK Open	2R	3R	2R	3R	4R	DNQ	4R	DNQ			4R	3R	3R	2R	2R
Grand Slam of Darts	DNQ	RR	2R	Did not qualify											
PDC Non-ranked televised events
Championship League Darts	Not held	RR	RR	DNQ				Not held							
Career statistics
Year-end ranking	22	23	29	42	56	66	128	101	157	174	95	75	117	94	151

==== European Tour ====
Season	1	2	3	4	5	6	7	8	9	10	11	12	13
2014	DNQ		GDM; 2R	Did not qualify									
2017	GDC; 1R	Did not qualify							DDM; 2R	DNQ			
2018	DNQ		GDO; 2R	DNQ	EDG; 2R	Did not qualify							
2019	DNQ			GDO; 1R	DNQ			DDO; 3R	DNQ	ADC; 2R	DNQ		GDT; 1R

==== Players Championships ====
Season	1	2	3	4	5	6	7	8	9	10	11	12	13	14	15	16	17	18	19	20	21	22	23	24	25	26	27	28	29	30	31	32	33	34	35	36	37
2006	Did not participate						IRV; 1R	DNP																													
2007	GIB; 1R	GIB; 2R	DNP	ANT; 2R	DNP		HAI; 3R	HAI; 1R	DNP	BLA; 1R	DNP	CAS; 2R	DNP	NEW; 2R	DUB; 1R	IRV; 3R	DNP		LIS; 2R	LIS; 2R																	
2008	GIB; 3R	GIB; 3R	ESS; 2R	WIG; 3R	BAD; 3R	BAD; 2R	TEL; 2R	TEM; 3R	GLA; 2R	AMS; 3R	BRI; 3R	BRI; 4R	LVE; 1R	BLA; 1R	DNP			EIN; 1R	EIN; 2R	DNP		NEW; 1R	NEW; 2R	DUB; 2R	DUB; 2R	IRV; 2R	IRV; 1R	DNP	KIL; SF	LEI; 4R	LEI; 4R						
2009	DON; 2R	GIB; 3R	GIB; 3R	DNP		IRV; 1R	WIG; 1R	BRE; 2R	COV; 1R	NUL; 3R	NUL; 2R	TAU; 1R	DER; 1R	NEW; 2R	BAR; 2R	BAR; 2R	DIN; 1R	DIN; 3R	LVE; 2R	DNP		ATL; 3R	ATL; QF	SAL; 2R	SAL; QF	DUB; 1R	DUB; 3R	KIL; 2R	NUL; 2R	NUL; 2R	IRV; 1R	IRV; 4R					
2010	GIB; 2R	GIB; 1R	SWI; 2R	DER; PR	GLA; 1R	GLA; 4R	WIG; QF	CRA; 2R	BAR; 1R	DER; 1R	WIG; 1R	WIG; 2R	SAL; PR	SAL; 2R	BAR; 3R	BAR; 3R	HAA; 1R	HAA; 2R	LVE; 1R	LVE; PR	LVE; 1R	DNP			CRA; 1R	CRA; 4R	NUL; 2R	NUL; 1R	DUB; 3R	DUB; 2R	KIL; 3R	BAD; 2R	BAD; 2R	BAR; 2R	BAR; 1R	DER; 2R	DER; 2R
2011	HAL; 4R	HAL; 2R	DER; 1R	DER; 1R	CRA; 1R	CRA; 3R	VIE; 1R	VIE; 2R	CRA; 2R	DNP	BAR; 1R	BAR; 1R	NUL; 1R	NUL; 1R	DNP		DER; 3R	DER; QF	NUL; 2R	NUL; 1R	DUB; 1R	DUB; 1R	KIL; 2R	GLA; 1R	GLA; 3R	ALI; 2R	ALI; 2R	CRA; 2R	CRA; 2R	WIG; 1R	WIG; 2R						
2012	ALI; 1R	ALI; 2R	REA; 1R	REA; 1R	Did not participate																																
2013	Did not participate				CRA; 1R	CRA; 1R	BAR; 1R	BAR; 1R	Did not participate						BAR; 3R	BAR; 1R																					
2014	BAR; 1R	BAR; 3R	CRA; 2R	CRA; 1R	WIG; 2R	WIG; 1R	WIG; 2R	WIG; 2R	CRA; 1R	CRA; 2R	COV; 1R	COV; 1R	Did not participate																								
2015 (Note: Not a Tour card holder)	BAR; 2R	BAR; 1R	Did not participate			COV; 1R	COV; 1R	COV; 3R	CRA; 1R	CRA; 1R	Did not participate								COV; 1R	COV; 2R																	
2016	Did not participate																DUB; 1R	DUB; 1R	BAR; 2R	BAR; 1R																	
2017	BAR; 1R	BAR; 1R	BAR; 1R	BAR; 2R	MIL; 1R	MIL; 1R	BAR; 2R	BAR; 3R	WIG; 1R	WIG; 2R	MIL; 1R	MIL; 1R	WIG; QF	WIG; 1R	BAR; 2R	BAR; 4R	BAR; 2R	BAR; 3R	DUB; 2R	DUB; 2R	BAR; 2R	BAR; 1R															
2018	BAR; 2R	BAR; 4R	BAR; 1R	BAR; 2R	MIL; 2R	MIL; 1R	BAR; 1R	BAR; 3R	WIG; 2R	WIG; 1R	MIL; 1R	MIL; 2R	WIG; 1R	WIG; 1R	BAR; 1R	BAR; 1R	BAR; 1R	BAR; 2R	DUB; 1R	DUB; 1R	BAR; 2R	BAR; 2R															
2019	WIG; 1R	WIG; 2R	WIG; 1R	WIG; 2R	BAR; 3R	BAR; 1R	WIG; 1R	WIG; 1R	BAR; 3R	BAR; 1R	BAR; 1R	BAR; 1R	BAR; 1R	BAR; 1R	BAR; 1R	BAR; 2R	WIG; 1R	WIG; 1R	BAR; 2R	BAR; 2R	HIL; 1R	HIL; 1R	BAR; 2R	BAR; 1R	BAR; 1R	BAR; 1R	DUB; 1R	DUB; 1R	DNP								
2020	BAR; 1R	BAR; 4R	WIG; 1R	WIG; 2R	WIG; 1R	WIG; 2R	BAR; 1R	BAR; 1R	MIL; 2R	MIL; 2R	MIL; 2R	MIL; 1R	MIL; 1R	NIE; 2R	NIE; 1R	NIE; 2R	NIE; 2R	NIE; 2R	COV; 2R	COV; 1R	COV; 1R	COV; 2R	COV; 2R														
2021	BOL; 3R	BOL; 1R	BOL; 1R	BOL; 3R	MIL; 3R	MIL; 2R	MIL; 2R	Did not participate					MIL; 2R	MIL; 1R	Did not participate						BAR; 1R	BAR; 1R	BAR; 1R	Did not participate													

Performance Table Legend
W	Won the tournament	F	Finalist	SF	Semifinalist	QF	Quarterfinalist	#R; RR; Prel.	Lost in # round Round-robin; Preliminary round	DQ	Disqualified
DNQ	Did not qualify	DNP	Did not participate	WD	Withdrew	NH	Tournament not held	#R; RR; Prel.	Lost in # round Round-robin; Preliminary round	NYF	Not yet founded
