= Chris Thompson (darts player) =

English darts player

Personal information
- Full name: Christopher Thompson
- Nickname: The Hitman
- Born: 8 December 1971 (age 54) York, England
- Home town: Acomb, North Yorkshire, England

Sport
- Sport: Darts
- Playing since: 1981
- Darts: 24 Gram Tony Eccles
- Laterality: Right-handed
- Walk-on music: "Boom Boom Boom" by The Outhere Brothers

Organisation (see split in darts)
- BDO: 1997–2007
- PDC: 2007–2013

WDF major events – best performances
- World Masters: Last 32: 2005

PDC premier events – best performances
- World Championship: Last 64: 2011
- UK Open: Quarter-finals: 2008

Chris Thompson (born 8 December 1971) is an English former professional darts player who played in Professional Darts Corporation (PDC) events. He used the nickname Hitman.

== Career ==
Thompson played county darts for Yorkshire for many years. In 1997, he reached the quarter-finals of the revived News of the World Darts Championship. His best result on the British Darts Organisation circuit was a British Open semi-final in 2004.

Thompson joined the PDC in 2007. At the 2008 UK Open, he defeated Adrian Gray, Steve Maish and Brendan Dolan on the way to the quarter-finals, where he was beaten 5–10 by Vincent van der Voort.

Thompson achieved some notable results on the 2010 PDC Pro Tour, reaching the semi-finals in two events. In one of those events, in Las Vegas, he defeated Phil Taylor in the quarter-finals before losing to Simon Whitlock.

As a result of his strong performances in 2010, he qualified for his first PDC World Championship in 2011 via the Players Championship Order of Merit. He lost 1–3 to Colin Osborne in the first round.

Thompson iss not a full-time professional darts player – he works for a legal firm in York. He supports Leeds United.

Thompson Quit the PDC in 2013.

== World Championship Results ==
=== PDC ===
- 2011: 1st Round (lost to Colin Osborne 1–3)
