= Tony Ayres (darts player) =

English darts player (1967–2021)

Personal information
- Nickname: T-Man
- Born: 17 June 1967 London, England
- Died: 27 November 2021 (aged 54)
- Home town: Billingshurst, England

Sport
- Sport: Darts
- Playing since: 1988
- Darts: 20g RedDragon
- Laterality: Right-handed
- Walk-on music: "Just Can't Get Enough" by Depeche Mode

Organisation (see split in darts)
- PDC: 2007–2013

PDC premier events – best performances
- World Championship: Last 32: 2009
- UK Open: Semi-final: 2010

Other tournament wins
- Tournament: Years
- Southern Counties Open: 2007

Tony Ayres (17 June 1967 – 27 November 2021) was an English professional darts player who played for the Professional Darts Corporation events.

== Career ==
Ayres' first television exposure came during the 2008 UK Open, reaching the last 64 stage where he lost 9–0 to Raymond van Barneveld.

Ayres qualified for the 2009 PDC World Darts Championship, taking one of eight qualification spots at the qualifying event in Telford. He defeated Andy Smith in the first round but was beaten in the second round by Andy Hamilton.

In the 2010 UK Open, he reached the semi-finals and in doing so, beat James Wade 10–9 In the semi-final he was defeated 10–3 by Scotsman Gary Anderson. Ayres won £10,000 by getting to the semi-final which lifted him from 57th to 49th in the Order of Merit.

On 27 November 2021, Ayres died at the age of 54 after suffering a heart attack whilst playing in a county darts match for Sussex.

== World Championship Results ==
=== PDC ===
- 2009: 2nd round (lost to Andy Hamilton 2-4) (sets)
