= Jason Clark (darts player) =

British darts player

Personal information
- Nickname: "Cockney Jock"
- Born: 26 March 1969 (age 57) Hammersmith, London, England
- Home town: Shepherd's Bush, London, England

Sport
- Sport: Darts
- Playing since: 1992
- Darts: 21g Raymond van Barneveld
- Laterality: Right-handed
- Walk-on music: "London Calling" by The Clash

Organisation (see split in darts)
- PDC: 2004–2011

PDC premier events – best performances
- World Championship: Last 32: 2006, 2008
- UK Open: Last 64: 2007, 2008, 2009
- US Open/WSoD: Last 64: 2007, 2008

Jason Clark (born 26 March 1969) is an English-born Scottish former professional darts player who competed in Professional Darts Corporation (PDC) events. He was not a full-time professional, he manages his own flooring supply and fitting company. Despite being born and raised in London, he represents Scotland as his family are entirely Scottish. As a result of his Scottish heritage and English upbringing, he is nicknamed the Cockney Jock. He has played County darts for both London and Middlesex.

== Career ==
Clark qualified for the 2005 PDC World Darts Championship, going through the first round against Japan's Yasuhiko Matsunaga, but lost in round two to Chris Mason. In the 2006 PDC World Darts Championship, he defeated Steve Maish in the first round, but narrowly lost in the second round to Peter Manley. After failing to qualify for the 2007 World Championship, he won a place in the 2008 PDC World Darts Championship as one of the highest ranked players in the 2007 PDC Pro Tour. He defeated 1988 World Champion Bob Anderson in the first round, but lost in the second round to then-current World Champion Raymond van Barneveld.

In January 2008, the PDC announced it had suspended Clark following his conduct at the PDC Annual Awards Dinner in London. He had been inducted into the PDC's Nine-Dart Club, achieving the feat at the German Darts Championship. The next month the Darts Regulation Authority released details of Clark's suspension as well as the suspension of Andy Jenkins. Clark was given a one-year ban with nine months suspended with the DRA reviewing his sentence every three months until January 2009. His ban was backdated to 10 January 2008, meaning that he returned to the circuit in April.

In January 2011, Clark declined the offer of a PDC Tour Card due to the fact that his family and business needed to come first and he could not fully commit enough of his time to darts.

== World Championship results ==
=== PDC ===
- 2005: 2nd round (lost to Chris Mason 1–3) (sets)
- 2006: 2nd Round (lost to Peter Manley 3–4)
- 2008: 2nd Round (lost to Raymond van Barneveld 1–4)
