= Steve Maish =

English darts player

Personal information
- Full name: Stephen Maish
- Nickname: "Mr Magic"
- Born: 22 November 1963 (age 62) Southend-on-Sea, Essex, England
- Home town: Wigan, Greater Manchester, England

Sport
- Sport: Darts
- Playing since: 1977
- Darts: 21g Target Pure
- Laterality: Right-handed
- Walk-on music: "A Kind of Magic" by Queen

Organisation (see split in darts)
- PDC: 1996–2017

PDC premier events – best performances
- World Championship: Last 32: 2004, 2008
- World Matchplay: Last 16: 2006
- UK Open: Last 32: 2006
- Grand Slam: Group stages 2009
- Desert Classic: Last 32: 2007, 2008
- US Open/WSoD: Last 16: 2009
- PC Finals: Last 32: 2009

Other tournament wins
- Years
Grand Slam Wild Card Qualifier	2009
Sheppey Darts Classic	2008
UK Open Scottish Regional Final	2004
- Updated on 17 February 2008

Stephen Maish (born 22 November 1963) is an English former professional darts player who competed in Professional Darts Corporation (PDC) events. He used the nickname Mr Magic for his matches.

== Career ==
Maish made his televised debut at the 2003 UK Open beating Vic Hubbard but lost 5–0 to former World Champion Steve Beaton. He then played in his first PDC World Darts Championship in 2004, beating former World Masters semi-finalist Tony Payne of the United States in the first round and then beat four-time World semi-finalist Cliff Lazarenko in the second round before losing in the third round to Wayne Mardle. He followed this with victory in the UK Open Scottish Regional and began his 2004 UK Open campaign in the third round, but was drawn against Phil Taylor who eventually beat him 8–3.

In 2005, he reached the final of the Irish Masters, losing to James Wade. He lost in the 2005 UK Open to Andy Hayfield and failed to qualify for the Las Vegas Desert Classic and World Grand Prix. He did however play in the 2006 PDC World Darts Championship, but lost in the first round to Jason Clark. He made then made two finals, the first being the UK Open North West Regional losing to Alan Tabern. The second was the Antwerp Open which he lost to defending champion Terry Jenkins. He then made the fourth round of the 2006 UK Open, starting in the third round stage with a win over Colin Osborne and eventually losing to Colin Lloyd.

Maish then got his own back on 'Jaws' in the 2006 World Matchplay in which Lloyd entered as the defending champion. Maish beat him 10–6 in the first round. He ended up losing in the next round to Chris Mason. Maish then had a poor run of form leading up the 2007 PDC World Darts Championship, and the poor form continued, losing in the first round to South African Wynand Havenga. This was followed with a first round exit from the inaugural US Open, losing to Canadian Dan Olson. He did however qualify for the Las Vegas Desert Classic for the first time, losing in the first round to defending champion John Part.

Maish qualified for the 2008 PDC World Darts Championship, he defeated former World Champion Dennis Priestley but lost in the second round to Tony Eccles.

Maish suffered a first round exit in the 2009 PDC World Darts Championship, losing 3–0 to Denis Ovens.

== VAT fraud trial ==
On 5 December 2017, Maish was jailed for two years for conspiring to cheat the public revenue. He and his five other conspirators fraudulently claimed £2.4 million in VAT repayments.

== World Championship results ==
=== PDC ===
- 2004: 3rd Round (lost to Wayne Mardle 2–4)
- 2006: 1st Round (lost to Jason Clark 2–3)
- 2007: 1st Round (lost to Wynand Havenga 2–3)
- 2008: 2nd Round (lost to Tony Eccles 3–4)
- 2009: 1st Round (lost to Denis Ovens 0–3)
- 2010: 1st Round (lost to Co Stompé 1–3)
- 2011: 1st Round (lost to Mark Webster 0–3)
