= Kevin McDine =

English darts player

Personal information
- Nickname: "SupaMc"
- Born: 23 May 1985 (age 41) Wallsend, England
- Home town: Wallsend, England

Sport
- Sport: Darts
- Playing since: 2000
- Darts: 24 Gram Datadart Phase 2 Signature
- Laterality: Right-handed
- Walk-on music: "Live and Let Die" by Guns N' Roses

Organisation (see split in darts)
- BDO: 2016
- PDC: 2004–2015, 2017

WDF major events – best performances
- World Masters: Last 272: 2016
- Int. Darts League: Preliminary: 2007

PDC premier events – best performances
- World Championship: Last 16: 2010
- World Matchplay: Quarter-Final: 2008
- UK Open: Last 16: 2010
- Grand Slam: Semi-Final: 2007

Other tournament wins
- Years
St Helens Darts Classic	2019
PDC Challenge Tour England	2017
West Tyrone Open	2008

Kevin McDine (born 23 May 1985) is an English professional darts player from Wallsend.

== Career ==
In November 2004, McDine reached the last 16 of the JR & Vauxhall Holiday Park 128 Plus Classic. He improved on that performance by reaching the semi-final of the Norfolk Open in November 2006. He won the Northants open in 2005 and 2006 and then joined the PDC in April 2007.

During 2007, he made quick progress up the world rankings. He qualified for the group stages of the International Darts League and also made his first PDC Pro Tour final – the Irish Regional final of the UK Open, where he lost to Raymond van Barneveld. Having started the year at 214th, he had made it to 58th by the cut-off point for automatic qualification for the 2008 World Championship and finished one place short of qualifying through the players championship route – he also failed to make it through the qualifying tournament for the event.

McDine qualified for the 2007 Grand Slam of Darts, making his way through a field of over 230 players at the ITV Wildcard Qualifying event. He produced an excellent set of results in the event. It raised his profile within the game dramatically as the event was shown on ITV1 & ITV4. McDine beat Peter Manley and Shaun Greatbatch in the group stages then beat World Matchplay & Grand Prix champion James Wade 10–7 and former World Champion Jelle Klaasen 10–3 before falling to Andy Hamilton 13–12 in the semi-final. Target darts sponsored him for this event and were impressed enough to offer him a full contract.

McDine also won the PDC's award for Best TV Performance of the Year 2007 for his performance against James Wade in the Grand Slam with an average of 105.79 coming back from 6–3 down, recording an average of 120+ in the last 8 legs.

McDine qualified for the 2008 World Matchplay through the PDC's Pro Tour Order of Merit. He beat Adrian Lewis 10–8 and Mark Walsh 13–9 to reach the quarter-finals where he lost to eventual winner Phil Taylor 16–6.

In the 2008 Grand Slam of Darts, he overcame Wayne Mardle 5–0 in his opening group game but then lost 5–1 to John Part. He then beat ladies champion Anastasia Dobromyslova 5–2 to advance to the knockout stages where he lost in the second round to Mervyn King 10–9 having led 6–2.

McDine made his World Championship debut at the 2009 tournament facing Alex Roy in the first round. McDine beat Roy by three sets to one to advance to the second round where he faced qualifier Dennis Smith. McDine came into the match with a hand injury sustained while cooking Christmas dinner, but managed to take a 3 sets to nil lead before Smith fought back to 3 sets all and eventually beat McDine 4–3.

In June 2010, McDine achieved a televised whitewash defeating Tony Broughton 9 – 0 in the UK Open.

At the 2014 PDC World Darts Championship, McDine won his first-round match by a 3-2 score line against Wayne Jones. In round 2 he faced world #1 Michael van Gerwen and lost by a score of 4-1.

In January 2016, McDine gave up his tour card and announced he would be competing in the BDO. He made his BDO debut in the Dutch Open, where he reached the semi-finals, losing 2-1 in sets to Martin Adams.

In November 2017, he failed to qualify for the 2018 PDC World Darts Championship. At the event McDine failed an in-competition drugs test after testing positive for cocaine and was later banned from all sport until 26 November 2019.

In June 2019, McDine won the 2019 St Helens Darts Classic by defeating James Richardson of England in the quarter-finals, Ryan Joyce of England in the semi-finals and Mark McGeeney of England in the Final.

== World Championship results ==
=== PDC ===
- 2009: 2nd round (lost to Dennis Smith 3–4)
- 2010: 3rd round (lost to Adrian Lewis 0–4)
- 2011: 2nd round (lost to Raymond van Barneveld 1–4)
- 2014: 2nd round (lost to Michael van Gerwen 1–4)
