= 2008 Championship League Darts =

Championship League Darts

Tournament information
- Dates: 2 September – 23 October
- Venue: Crondon Park Golf Club
- Location: Stock, Essex
- Country: England
- Organisation(s): PDC
- Format: Legs
- Prize fund: £189,000
- Winner's share: £10,000
- Nine-dart finish: Adrian Lewis

Champion(s)
- (England) Phil Taylor

The 2008 Championship League Darts is the inaugural edition of a darts competition – the Championship League Darts. The competition is organised and held by the Professional Darts Corporation and has a maximum prize fund of £189,000.

The format of the tournament is similar to the Premier League Darts tournament, also organised by the PDC, except it is contested by a larger pool of players who are split up into a number of groups.

In a first for darts the tournament will be shown in its entirety on the internet. Every match can be watched in the UK on the Ladbrokes and bet365 websites. The tournament will also be available globally through the internet, except in the United States of America where it can't be shown for legal reasons.

== Format ==
The first group will consist of the top 8 players from the PDC Order of Merit who are available for the competition. These 8 players will play each other over the course of a day and receive points for their performance. A win will earn a player two points, whilst a draw will earn them 1 point. All matches will be contested over 10 legs with a player winning the match when the reach 6 legs or the match being declared a draw should the score reach 5–5. When all players have played each other, the four players with the most points will progress to the semi-finals with the winners of those matches progressing into the final.

The winner of the final will progress to the winners group which shall take place at the end of the competition. The runner-up, losing semi-finalists and the players finishing fifth and sixth will move into group two, where they will be joined by the next three players in the Order of Merit. The format of the second group will be the same as the first group with players moving into the third group. In total there will be 8 groups before the final group takes place.

This format ensures that all players who don't win the group or finish in the last two positions will have another chance to qualify for the winners group.

== Qualification ==
Players must have been in top 29 places in PDC Order of Merit following 2008 World Matchplay Darts in order to qualify. 31 places used because of Raymond Van Barneveld and John Part withdrawing.

PDC Order of Merit following 2008 World Matchplay Darts.

1. Phil Taylor | 2. ~~Raymond van Barneveld~~ | 3. James Wade | 4. ~~John Part~~ | 5. Terry Jenkins | 6. Wayne Mardle | 7. Adrian Lewis | 8. Andy Hamilton | 9. Colin Lloyd | 10. Roland Scholten | 11. Dennis Priestley | 12. Peter Manley | 13. Alan Tabern | 14. Ronnie Baxter | 15. Colin Osborne | 16. Kevin Painter | 17. Mervyn King | 18. Denis Ovens | 19. Mark Dudbridge | 20. Vincent van der Voort | 21. Chris Mason | 22. Kirk Shepherd | 23. Andy Jenkins | 24. Barrie Bates | 25. Andy Smith | 26. Mark Walsh | 27. Adrian Gray | 28. Wayne Jones | 29. Mick McGowan | 30. Alex Roy | 31. Wes Newton

== Player omissions and delays ==
Raymond van Barneveld, who is taking a two-month sabbatical from darts, and John Part, based in Canada, will not be competing in the tournament. Adrian Lewis will also enter in group 3, not group 1 as his ranking would suggest, because he has been suspended from playing in any PDC tournaments for two months following an altercation with Kevin Painter. Peter Manley is also entering the competition later than his ranking would suggest, for unknown reasons.

On 1 September it was announced that Dennis Priestley had withdrawn from group 2 due to his ongoing treatment for prostate cancer. As such he has been replaced in group 2 by Mervyn King. Subsequent group line-ups have also changed, with players from later groups being brought into earlier ones. Priestley hopes to return in time for group 7.

== Prize money ==
The prize money for the tournament is a unique concept with players winning a set amount of money for each leg that they win.

=== Groups 1 – 8 ===
In groups 1 – 8 the prize money will be as follows:

- Group Matches – £50 per leg won
- Play-off Matches – £100 per leg won

=== Winners Group ===
In the winners group the prize money will be as follows:

- Group Matches – £100 per leg won
- Play-off Matches – £200 per leg won

In addition the winners group will have separate prizes for the winner, runner-up and losing semi-finalists. These prizes will breakdown as follows:

- Winner – £10,000 and a place in the 2008 Grand Slam of Darts
- Runner-up – £5,000
- Losing Semi-finalists – £2,500 each

=== Prize money won ===
The following table shows the amount of prize money that has been won by each player.

Player	Group Legs won	Play-Off Legs won	Winners Group Legs won	Winners Play-Off Legs won	Final position money won*	Total money won
(England) Phil Taylor	41	13	41	13	£10,000	£20,050
(England) Mervyn King	72	18	31	11	£5,000	£15,700
(England) Mark Walsh	111	25	38	5	£2,500	£15,350
(England) Adrian Lewis	219	43	0	0	0	£15,250
(England) Andy Hamilton	137	21	30	0	0	£11,950
(England) Alan Tabern	70	18	33	4	£2,500	£11,900
(England) Mark Dudbridge	142	16	27	0	0	£10,900
(England) Colin Osborne	104	14	30	0	0	£9,600
(Netherlands) Vincent van der Voort	102	22	21	0	0	£9,400
(England) Kevin Painter	96	12	0	0	0	£6,000
(England) Andy Smith	92	3	0	0	0	£4,900
(England) James Wade	95	0	0	0	0	£4,750
(England) Peter Manley	88	2	0	0	0	£4,600
(England) Wayne Mardle	84	0	0	0	0	£4,200
(England) Dennis Priestley	63	10	0	0	0	£4,150
(England) Wayne Jones	65	4	0	0	0	£3,650
(Wales) Barrie Bates	65	3	0	0	0	£3,550
(England) Colin Lloyd	57	6	0	0	0	£3,450
(England) Denis Ovens	45	4	0	0	0	£2,650
(England) Kirk Shepherd	51	0	0	0	0	£2,550
(England) Chris Mason	29	0	0	0	0	£1,450
(England) Ronnie Baxter	28	0	0	0	0	£1,400
(England) Alex Roy	28	0	0	0	0	£1,400
(England) Wes Newton	27	0	0	0	0	£1,350
(Republic of Ireland) Mick McGowan	24	0	0	0	0	£1,200
(England) Adrian Gray	22	0	0	0	0	£1,100
(England) Terry Jenkins	19	0	0	0	0	£950
(England) Andy Jenkins	18	0	0	0	0	£900
(Netherlands) Roland Scholten	18	0	0	0	0	£900

*Final position money is awarded to the semi-finalists of the winners group (£2,500), the runner-up, (£5,000), and the overall winner (£10,000).

== Tournament Dates ==
The tournament will take place over 9 days throughout September and October 2008. One group will be played on each day. The dates are as follows:

- Group 1 – Tuesday 2 September 2008
- Group 2 – Wednesday 3 September 2008
- Group 3 – Monday 22 September 2008
- Group 4 – Tuesday 23 September 2008
- Group 5 – Wednesday 24 September 2008
- Group 6 – Thursday 25 September 2008
- Group 7 – Tuesday 21 October 2008
- Group 8 – Wednesday 22 October 2008
- Winners Group – Thursday 23 October 2008

The tournament will take place at the Crondon Park Golf Club in Essex.

== Groups ==
The groups are as follows:

Note: Bold indicates group winner, italics indicate the eliminated players. In groups 1–7, players are eliminated for finishing in the bottom two of the league, in group 8 and the Winners Group players are eliminated for failing to win outright.

**Group 1**
- (England) **Phil Taylor**
- (England) James Wade
- (England) Terry Jenkins
- (England) Wayne Mardle
- (England) Andy Hamilton
- (England) Colin Lloyd
- (Netherlands) Roland Scholten
- (England) Alan Tabern

**Group 2**
- (England) Colin Lloyd
- (England) Andy Hamilton
- (England) **Alan Tabern**
- (England) James Wade
- (England) Wayne Mardle
- (England) Ronnie Baxter
- (England) Kevin Painter
- (England) Mervyn King

**Group 3**
- (England) Kevin Painter
- (England) Andy Hamilton
- (England) **Mervyn King**
- (England) James Wade
- (England) Wayne Mardle
- (England) Adrian Lewis
- (England) Colin Osborne
- (England) Denis Ovens

**Group 4**
- (England) Adrian Lewis
- (England) Colin Osborne
- (England) Denis Ovens
- (England) Kevin Painter
- (England) **Andy Hamilton**
- (England) Peter Manley
- (Netherlands) Vincent van der Voort
- (England) Mark Dudbridge

**Group 5**
- (Netherlands) Vincent van der Voort
- (England) Adrian Lewis
- (England) Mark Dudbridge
- (England) **Colin Osborne**
- (England) Peter Manley
- (England) Andy Jenkins
- (England) Chris Mason
- (England) Kirk Shepherd

**Group 6**
- (England) Adrian Lewis
- (England) Mark Dudbridge
- (England) Peter Manley
- (Netherlands) **Vincent van der Voort**
- (England) Kirk Shepherd
- (England) Mark Walsh
- (Wales) Barrie Bates
- (England) Andy Smith

**Group 7**
- (England) Mark Walsh
- (England) Adrian Lewis
- (Wales) Barrie Bates
- (England) Andy Smith
- (England) **Mark Dudbridge**
- (England) Dennis Priestley
- (England) Adrian Gray
- (England) Wayne Jones

**Group 8**
- (England) Adrian Lewis
- (England) **Mark Walsh**
- (England) Andy Smith
- (England) Wayne Jones
- (England) Dennis Priestley
- (Republic of Ireland) Mick McGowan
- (England) Alex Roy
- (England) Wes Newton

Winners Group

- (England) **Phil Taylor**
- (England) Alan Tabern
- (England) Mervyn King
- (England) Andy Hamilton
- (England) Colin Osborne
- (Netherlands) Vincent van der Voort
- (England) Mark Dudbridge
- (England) Mark Walsh

== Results ==
=== Group One ===
Played Tuesday 2 September, results as follows:

League stages

Phil Taylor 5–5 James Wade Alan Tabern 6–2 Roland Scholten Colin Lloyd 6–0 Andy Hamilton Wayne Mardle 6–2 Terry Jenkins Phil Taylor 6–4 Alan Tabern Colin Lloyd 6–4 Terry Jenkins Andy Hamilton 6–3 Wayne Mardle James Wade 5–5 Roland Scholten Alan Tabern 6–2 Terry Jenkins	Phil Taylor 6–2 Colin Lloyd Wayne Mardle 6–3 Roland Scholten James Wade 5–5 Andy Hamilton Phil Taylor 6–1 Terry Jenkins Alan Tabern 5–5 Colin Lloyd James Wade 5–5 Wayne Mardle Andy Hamilton 6–3 Roland Scholten Terry Jenkins 6–1 Roland Scholten Phil Taylor 6–1 Andy Hamilton	Colin Lloyd 5–5 James Wade Wayne Mardle 6–3 Alan Tabern Andy Hamilton 5–5 Alan Tabern James Wade 6–1 Terry Jenkins Colin Lloyd 6–4 Roland Scholten Phil Taylor 6–1 Wayne Mardle Phil Taylor 6–0 Roland Scholten Andy Hamilton 6–3 Terry Jenkins Colin Lloyd 6–4 Wayne Mardle Alan Tabern 6–3 James Wade

Final league table

Pos	Name	P	W	D	L	+/-	Pts
1	(England) Phil Taylor	7	6	1	0	+27	13
2	(England) Colin Lloyd	7	4	2	1	+8	10
3	(England) Alan Tabern	7	3	2	2	+6	8
4	(England) Andy Hamilton	7	3	2	2	−2	8
5	(England) James Wade	7	1	5	1	+2	7
6	(England) Wayne Mardle	7	3	1	3	0	7
7	(England) Terry Jenkins	7	1	0	6	−18	2
8	(Netherlands) Roland Scholten	7	0	1	6	−23	1

NB: Players separated by +/- leg difference if tied.
Green – Qualified for the semi-finals, Gold – Did not qualify for semi-finals but returns in next group, Red – Out of the tournament

Semi-finals

Phil Taylor 6–3 Andy Hamilton

Colin Lloyd 6–5 Alan Tabern

Final

Phil Taylor 7–0 Colin Lloyd

=== Group Two ===
Played Wednesday 3 September, results as follows:

League stages

James Wade 6–4 Wayne Mardle Kevin Painter 5–5 Mervyn King Alan Tabern 6–4 Ronnie Baxter Andy Hamilton 6–4 Colin Lloyd Mervyn King 6–4 James Wade Andy Hamilton 6–2 Ronnie Baxter Colin Lloyd 5–5 Alan Tabern Wayne Mardle 5–5 Kevin Painter Mervyn King 5–5 Andy Hamilton	Ronnie Baxter 6–3 James Wade Kevin Painter 6–3 Colin Lloyd Wayne Mardle 6–4 Alan Tabern Andy Hamilton 6–4 James Wade Mervyn King 6–4 Ronnie Baxter Colin Lloyd 6–0 Wayne Mardle Kevin Painter 6–4 Alan Tabern Kevin Painter 5–5 Andy Hamilton Alan Tabern 5–5 James Wade	Wayne Mardle 6–2 Ronnie Baxter Mervyn King 6–3 Colin Lloyd Alan Tabern 6–4 Mervyn King Andy Hamilton 6–3 Wayne Mardle Kevin Painter 6–4 Ronnie Baxter James Wade 6–0 Colin Lloyd Kevin Painter 5–5 James Wade Andy Hamilton 5–5 Alan Tabern Ronnie Baxter 6–0 Colin Lloyd Mervyn King 6–4 Wayne Mardle

Final league table

Pos	Name	P	W	D	L	+/-	Pts
1	(England) Andy Hamilton	7	4	3	0	+11	11
2	(England) Mervyn King	7	4	2	1	+7	10
3	(England) Kevin Painter	7	3	4	0	+7	10
4	(England) Alan Tabern	7	2	3	2	0	7
5	(England) James Wade	7	2	2	3	+1	6
6	(England) Wayne Mardle	7	2	1	4	−8	5
7	(England) Ronnie Baxter	7	2	0	5	−5	4
8	(England) Colin Lloyd	7	1	1	5	−14	3

NB: Players separated by +/- leg difference if tied.
Green – Qualified for the semi-finals, Gold – Did not qualify for semi-finals but returns in next group, Red – Out of the tournament

Semi-finals

Alan Tabern 6–5 Andy Hamilton

Kevin Painter 6–5 Mervyn King

Final

Alan Tabern 7–6 Kevin Painter

=== Group Three ===
Played Monday 22 September, results as follows:

League stages

James Wade 5–5 Wayne Mardle Mervyn King 5–5 Denis Ovens Colin Osborne 6–3 Kevin Painter Adrian Lewis 6–2 Andy Hamilton James Wade 6–2 Denis Ovens Kevin Painter 6–4 Adrian Lewis Andy Hamilton 5–5 Colin Osborne Wayne Mardle 5–5 Mervyn King Adrian Lewis 6–1 Denis Ovens	Kevin Painter 6–3 James Wade Mervyn King 6–4 Andy Hamilton Colin Osborne 6–4 Wayne Mardle Adrian Lewis* 6–2 James Wade Denis Ovens 6–4 Kevin Painter Andy Hamilton 6–4 Wayne Mardle Colin Osborne 6–1 Mervyn King Mervyn King 6–4 Adrian Lewis Colin Osborne 6–2 James Wade	Kevin Painter 6–1 Wayne Mardle Denis Ovens 6–3 Andy Hamilton Denis Ovens 6–3 Colin Osborne Wayne Mardle 5–5 Adrian Lewis Mervyn King 6–1 Kevin Painter James Wade 5–5 Andy Hamilton Mervyn King 5–5 James Wade Adrian Lewis 6–4 Colin Osborne Andy Hamilton 6–4 Kevin Painter Denis Ovens 6–1 Wayne Mardle

*Adrian Lewis hit a nine dart finish

Final league table

Pos	Name	P	W	D	L	+/-	Pts
1	(England) Adrian Lewis	7	4	1	2	+11	9
2	(England) Colin Osborne	7	4	1	2	+9	9
3	(England) Mervyn King	7	3	3	1	+4	9
4	(England) Denis Ovens	7	4	1	2	+2	9
5	(England) Kevin Painter	7	3	0	4	0	6
6	(England) Andy Hamilton	7	2	2	3	−5	6
7	(England) James Wade	7	1	3	3	−7	5
8	(England) Wayne Mardle	7	0	3	4	−14	3

NB: Players separated by +/- leg difference if tied.
Green – Qualified for the semi-finals, Gold – Did not qualify for semi-finals but returns in next group, Red – Out of the tournament

Semi-finals

Adrian Lewis 6–4 Denis Ovens

Mervyn King 6–1 Colin Osborne

Final

Mervyn King 7–5 Adrian Lewis

=== Group Four ===
Played Tuesday 23 September, results as follows:

League stages

Andy Hamilton 6–4 Adrian Lewis Mark Dudbridge 6–2 Vincent van der Voort Kevin Painter 5–5 Denis Ovens Colin Osborne 6–2 Peter Manley Vincent van der Voort 5–5 Adrian Lewis Peter Manley 6–1 Denis Ovens Colin Osborne 6–3 Kevin Painter Andy Hamilton 5–5 Mark Dudbridge Vincent van der Voort 6–2 Peter Manley	Adrian Lewis 6–1 Denis Ovens Colin Osborne 6–1 Mark Dudbridge Andy Hamilton 6–4 Kevin Painter Adrian Lewis 6–4 Peter Manley Vincent van der Voort 6–0 Denis Ovens Andy Hamilton 6–4 Colin Osborne Mark Dudbridge 6–4 Kevin Painter Mark Dudbridge 6–2 Peter Manley Kevin Painter 5–5 Adrian Lewis	Andy Hamilton 6–2 Denis Ovens Vincent van der Voort 6–4 Colin Osborne Vincent van der Voort 6–3 Kevin Painter Peter Manley 6–3 Andy Hamilton Mark Dudbridge 6–3 Denis Ovens Adrian Lewis 6–2 Colin Osborne Adrian Lewis 6–4 Mark Dudbridge Peter Manley 6–4 Kevin Painter Colin Osborne 6–1 Denis Ovens Andy Hamilton 6–4 Vincent van der Voort

Final league table

Pos	Name	P	W	D	L	+/-	Pts
1	(England) Andy Hamilton	7	5	1	1	+9	11
2	(England) Adrian Lewis	7	4	2	1	+11	10
3	(Netherlands) Vincent van der Voort	7	4	1	2	+9	9
4	(England) Mark Dudbridge	7	4	1	2	+6	9
5	(England) Colin Osborne	7	4	0	3	+9	8
6	(England) Peter Manley	7	3	0	4	−4	6
7	(England) Kevin Painter	7	0	2	5	−12	2
8	(England) Denis Ovens	7	0	1	6	−28	1

NB: Players separated by +/- leg difference if tied.
Green – Qualified for the semi-finals, Gold – Did not qualify for semi-finals but returns in next group, Red – Out of the tournament

Semi-finals

Andy Hamilton 6–0 Mark Dudbridge

Vincent van der Voort 6–3 Adrian Lewis

Final

Andy Hamilton 7–3 Vincent van der Voort

=== Group Five ===
Played Wednesday 24 September, results as follows:

League stages

Peter Manley 6–2 Adrian Lewis Kirk Shepherd 6–4 Andy Jenkins Vincent van der Voort 6–1 Chris Mason Colin Osborne 6–4 Mark Dudbridge Adrian Lewis 6–0 Andy Jenkins Colin Osborne 6–4 Chris Mason Mark Dudbridge 6–4 Vincent van der Voort Peter Manley 5–5 Kirk Shepherd Colin Osborne 6–1 Andy Jenkins	Adrian Lewis 6–4 Chris Mason Kirk Shepherd 6–4 Mark Dudbridge Vincent van der Voort 6–3 Peter Manley Adrian Lewis 6–2 Colin Osborne Andy Jenkins 5–5 Chris Mason Mark Dudbridge 6–3 Peter Manley Vincent van der Voort 6–4 Kirk Shepherd Colin Osborne 6–1 Kirk Shepherd Adrian Lewis 6–2 Vincent van der Voort	Chris Mason 6–4 Peter Manley Mark Dudbridge 6–0 Andy Jenkins Vincent van der Voort 5–5 Andy Jenkins Peter Manley 6–2 Colin Osborne Chris Mason 5–5 Kirk Shepherd Adrian Lewis 6–1 Mark Dudbridge Kirk Shepherd 5–5 Adrian Lewis Colin Osborne 6–2 Vincent van der Voort Mark Dudbridge 6–4 Chris Mason Peter Manley 6–3 Andy Jenkins

Final league table

Pos	Name	P	W	D	L	+/-	Pts
1	(England) Adrian Lewis	7	5	1	1	+17	11
2	(England) Colin Osborne	7	5	0	2	+10	10
3	(England) Mark Dudbridge	7	4	0	3	+4	8
4	(England) Peter Manley	7	3	1	3	+3	7
5	(Netherlands) Vincent van der Voort	7	3	1	3	0	7
6	(England) Kirk Shepherd	7	2	3	2	−3	7
7	(England) Chris Mason	7	1	2	4	−9	4
8	(England) Andy Jenkins	7	0	2	5	−22	2

NB: Players separated by +/- leg difference if tied.
Green – Qualified for the semi-finals, Gold – Did not qualify for semi-finals but returns in next group, Red – Out of the tournament

Semi-finals

Adrian Lewis 6–2 Peter Manley

Colin Osborne 6–3 Mark Dudbridge

Final

Colin Osborne 7–5 Adrian Lewis

=== Group Six ===
Played Thursday 25 September, results as follows:

League stages

Barrie Bates 6–2 Kirk Shepherd Mark Walsh 6–1 Andy Smith Adrian Lewis 6–4 Peter Manley Vincent van der Voort 6–2 Mark Dudbridge Mark Walsh 5–5 Adrian Lewis Barrie Bates 6–4 Mark Dudbridge Vincent van der Voort 5–5 Kirk Shepherd Andy Smith 6–3 Peter Manley Mark Walsh 6–4 Mark Dudbridge	Adrian Lewis 5–5 Barrie Bates Vincent van der Voort 6–3 Andy Smith Peter Manley 6–1 Kirk Shepherd Adrian Lewis 6–4 Mark Dudbridge Mark Walsh 5–5 Barrie Bates Vincent van der Voort 6–3 Peter Manley Andy Smith 6–3 Kirk Shepherd Mark Dudbridge 6–2 Andy Smith Adrian Lewis 6–2 Kirk Shepherd	Barrie Bates 5–5 Peter Manley Vincent van der Voort 6–3 Mark Walsh Mark Walsh 6–0 Kirk Shepherd Mark Dudbridge 6–4 Peter Manley Andy Smith 6–3 Barrie Bates Adrian Lewis 6–3 Vincent van der Voort Andy Smith 6–4 Adrian Lewis Kirk Shepherd 6–4 Mark Dudbridge Barrie Bates 6–4 Vincent van der Voort Mark Walsh 6–2 Peter Manley

Final league table

Pos	Name	P	W	D	L	+/-	Pts
1	(England) Mark Walsh	7	4	2	1	+14	10
2	(England) Adrian Lewis	7	4	2	1	+9	10
3	(Netherlands) Vincent van der Voort	7	4	1	2	+8	9
4	(Wales) Barrie Bates	7	3	3	1	+5	9
5	(England) Andy Smith	7	4	0	3	−1	8
6	(England) Mark Dudbridge	7	2	0	5	−6	4
7	(England) Peter Manley	7	1	1	5	−9	3
8	(England) Kirk Shepherd	7	1	1	5	−20	3

NB: Players separated by +/- leg difference if tied.
Green – Qualified for the semi-finals, Gold – Did not qualify for semi-finals but returns in next group, Red – Out of the tournament

Semi-finals

Mark Walsh 6–3 Barrie Bates

Vincent van der Voort 6–5 Adrian Lewis

Final

Vincent van der Voort 7–2 Mark Walsh

=== Group Seven ===
Played Tuesday 21 October, results as follows:

League stages

Adrian Lewis 6–3 Dennis Priestley Wayne Jones 6–1 Adrian Gray Mark Walsh 6–3 Andy Smith Barrie Bates 6–3 Mark Dudbridge Adrian Lewis 6–4 Wayne Jones Mark Walsh 5–5 Mark Dudbridge Andy Smith 6–3 Barrie Bates Dennis Priestley 6–4 Adrian Gray Mark Dudbridge 6–3 Wayne Jones	Adrian Lewis 6–3 Mark Walsh Barrie Bates 6–3 Adrian Gray Dennis Priestley 6–4 Andy Smith Adrian Lewis 6–3 Mark Dudbridge Mark Walsh 6–3 Wayne Jones Dennis Priestley 6–0 Barrie Bates Adrian Gray 6–4 Andy Smith Mark Dudbridge 6–3 Adrian Gray Andy Smith 6–3 Adrian Lewis	Mark Walsh 6–3 Dennis Priestley Wayne Jones 6–4 Barrie Bates Andy Smith 6–3 Wayne Jones Mark Dudbridge 6–2 Dennis Priestley Mark Walsh 6–1 Adrian Gray Adrian Lewis 6–4 Barrie Bates Adrian Lewis 6–4 Adrian Gray Mark Dudbridge 6–4 Andy Smith Barrie Bates 6–4 Mark Walsh Wayne Jones 6–3 Dennis Priestley

Final league table

Pos	Name	P	W	D	L	+/-	Pts
1	(England) Adrian Lewis	7	6	0	1	+12	12
2	(England) Mark Walsh	7	4	1	2	+9	9
3	(England) Mark Dudbridge	7	4	1	2	+6	9
4	(England) Andy Smith	7	3	0	4	0	6
5	(England) Wayne Jones	7	3	0	4	−1	6
6	(England) Dennis Priestley	7	3	0	4	−3	6
7	(Wales) Barrie Bates	7	3	0	4	−5	6
8	(England) Adrian Gray	7	1	0	6	−18	2

NB: Players separated by +/- leg difference if tied.
Green – Qualified for the semi-finals, Gold – Did not qualify for semi-finals but returns in next group, Red – Out of the tournament

Semi-finals

Adrian Lewis 6–3 Andy Smith

Mark Dudbridge 6–4 Mark Walsh

Final

Mark Dudbridge 7–4 Adrian Lewis

=== Group Eight ===
Played Wednesday 22 October, results as follows:

League stages

Adrian Lewis 5–5 Dennis Priestley Wes Newton 6–3 Alex Roy Wayne Jones 6–3 Mick McGowan Mark Walsh 6–4 Andy Smith Adrian Lewis 6–1 Wes Newton Andy Smith 6–1 Mick McGowan Mark Walsh 6–4 Wayne Jones Alex Roy 6–4 Dennis Priestley Andy Smith 6–4 Wes Newton	Mick McGowan 6–2 Adrian Lewis Mark Walsh 6–0 Alex Roy Wayne Jones 6–2 Dennis Priestley Adrian Lewis 6–3 Andy Smith Wes Newton 6–4 Mick McGowan Dennis Priestley 6–2 Mark Walsh Wayne Jones 6–3 Alex Roy Alex Roy 6–3 Andy Smith Wayne Jones 6–3 Adrian Lewis	Dennis Priestley 6–3 Mick McGowan Mark Walsh 6–2 Wes Newton Wes Newton 6–0 Wayne Jones Dennis Priestley 5–5 Andy Smith Alex Roy 6–4 Mick McGowan Mark Walsh 6–2 Adrian Lewis Adrian Lewis 6–4 Alex Roy Wayne Jones 6–3 Andy Smith Mark Walsh 6–3 Mick McGowan Dennis Priestley 6–2 Wes Newton

Final league table

Pos	Name	P	W	D	L	+/-	Pts
1	(England) Mark Walsh	7	6	0	1	+17	12
2	(England) Wayne Jones	7	5	0	2	+8	10
3	(England) Dennis Priestley	7	3	2	2	+5	8
4	(England) Adrian Lewis	7	3	1	3	−1	7
5	(England) Wes Newton	7	3	0	4	−4	6
6	(England) Alex Roy	7	3	0	4	−6	6
7	(England) Andy Smith	7	2	1	4	−5	5
8	(Republic of Ireland) Mick McGowan	7	1	0	6	−14	2

NB: Players separated by +/- leg difference if tied.
Green – Qualified for the semi-finals, Red – Out of the tournament

Semi-finals

Mark Walsh 6–3 Adrian Lewis

Dennis Priestley 6–4 Wayne Jones

Final

Mark Walsh 7–4 Dennis Priestley

=== Winners Group ===
Played Thursday 23 October, results as follows:

League stages

Phil Taylor 6–2 Alan Tabern Mark Walsh 6–1 Mark Dudbridge Colin Osborne 6–3 Vincent van der Voort Mervyn King 5–5 Andy Hamilton Phil Taylor 6–4 Mark Walsh Mervyn King 6–1 Vincent van der Voort Andy Hamilton 5–5 Colin Osborne Alan Tabern 5–5 Mark Dudbridge Mark Walsh 6–2 Mervyn King	Phil Taylor 6–4 Vincent van der Voort Mark Dudbridge 6–3 Andy Hamilton Alan Tabern 5–5 Colin Osborne Phil Taylor 6–1 Mervyn King Mark Walsh 6–2 Vincent van der Voort Alan Tabern 5–5 Andy Hamilton Mark Dudbridge 5–5 Colin Osborne Mervyn King 6–3 Mark Dudbridge Phil Taylor 6–0 Colin Osborne	Alan Tabern 6–0 Vincent van der Voort Mark Walsh 6–3 Andy Hamilton Colin Osborne 5–5 Mark Walsh Alan Tabern 5–5 Mervyn King Vincent van der Voort 6–2 Mark Dudbridge Phil Taylor 6–4 Andy Hamilton Mark Dudbridge 5–5 Phil Taylor Mervyn King 6–4 Colin Osborne Andy Hamilton 5–5 Vincent van der Voort Mark Walsh 5–5 Alan Tabern

Final league table

Pos	Name	P	W	D	L	+/-	Pts
1	(England) Phil Taylor	7	6	1	0	+21	13
2	(England) Mark Walsh	7	4	2	1	+14	10
3	(England) Mervyn King	7	3	2	2	+1	8
4	(England) Alan Tabern	7	1	5	1	+2	7
5	(England) Colin Osborne	7	1	4	2	−5	6
6	(England) Mark Dudbridge	7	1	3	3	−9	5
7	(England) Andy Hamilton	7	0	4	3	−8	4
8	(Netherlands) Vincent van der Voort	7	1	1	5	−16	3

NB: Players separated by +/- leg difference if tied.
Green – Qualified for the semi-finals, Red – Out of the tournament

Semi-finals £2,500 each

(1) (England) Phil Taylor 6–4 (England) Alan Tabern (4)

(3) (England) Mervyn King 6–5 (England) Mark Walsh (2)

Final Winner: £10,000 & 2008 Grand Slam of Darts place, Runner-up: £5,000

(1) (England) Phil Taylor 7–5 (England) Mervyn King (3)
