= Jacko Barry =

Irish darts player

Personal information
- Full name: Jason Barry
- Nickname: "Jacko"
- Born: 13 February 1975 (age 51) Dublin, Ireland
- Home town: Rush, County Dublin, Ireland

Sport
- Sport: Darts
- Playing since: 1991
- Darts: 26 gram
- Laterality: Right-handed
- Walk-on music: "Back in Black" by AC/DC

Organisation (see split in darts)
- BDO: 2010–2016
- PDC: 2007–2009

WDF major events – best performances
- World Masters: Last 264: 2011

PDC premier events – best performances
- World Championship: Last 64: 2008
- World Grand Prix: Quarter Finals: 2009
- UK Open: Last 32: 2008
- European Championship: Last 32: 2008

Other tournament wins
- Tournament: Years
- Ireland Players Championship: 2010, 2012, 2012

Jason "Jacko" Barry (born 13 February 1975) is an Irish former professional darts player who competed in Professional Darts Corporation (PDC) tournaments. His best performance at a PDC major tournament was reaching the quarter-finals of the 2009 World Grand Prix.

== Career ==
Barry qualified for the World Grand Prix for the first time in 2007, coming through a record-breaking field of 549 players at the Citywest Hotel in Dublin by defeating Brendan Dolan 6–5 in the final qualifying round. He competed against world number sixteen Andy Jenkins in the first round and lost 1–2 in sets. Following the World Grand Prix, Barry qualified for the 2008 PDC World Darts Championship, beating Jamie Harvey 5–3 in his last match. He faced Irish compatriot Mick McGowan in the first round, losing 0–3 in sets despite finishing the match with a higher three-dart average.

Barry followed these tournaments up with a run to the fourth round of the 2008 UK Open. He defeated Adrian Welsh and Alan Casey in the early stages to secure his place in the last 32. The fourth round draw saw Barry matched up against world number one and defending champion Raymond van Barneveld. Coming from 1–5 and 3–6 down, Barry levelled the score with checkouts of 128 and 140 before Van Barneveld eventually took a 9–7 victory.

At the 2008 World Grand Prix, Barry achieved his first win on television by beating Brendan Dolan in the first round. With Dolan 104 points away from victory, Barry produced a 144 checkout to tie the match. Barry went on to win the deciding set in a sudden death leg and take the 2–1 victory. In the second round, Barry was eliminated in a 0–3 loss to reigning world champion John Part. He also competed at the inaugural European Championship through a qualifier in Dinslaken, but lost to Phil Taylor 1–5 in round one.

Barry qualified for his third successive World Grand Prix in 2009. He beat Mick McGowan 2–0 in the first round, before defeating Steve Beaton 3–2 in the second round to advance to his first televised quarter-final. He faced Raymond van Barneveld for a place in the semi-finals, but lost 0–4. This was his last appearance at a PDC major tournament, playing his last PDPA Players Championship events later in the year.

== Personal life ==
Barry has worked as a lorry driver; he hoped that his quarter-final result at the 2009 World Grand Prix would "get [him] a bit of sponsorship". When he first joined the PDC, he became acquainted with fellow Irish player Mick McGowan and the two travelled to tournaments together.

== World Championship results ==
=== PDC ===
- 2008: 1st Round (lost to Mick McGowan 0–3) (sets)
