= 2012 Championship League Darts =

Tournament information
- Dates: 25 September–1 November 2012
- Venue: Crondon Park Golf Club
- Location: Stock, Essex, England
- Organisation(s): PDC
- Format: Legs
- Prize fund: £176,650

Champion(s)
- (England) Phil Taylor

The 2012 Championship League Darts was the fifth edition of a darts competition — the Championship League Darts. The competition was organised and held by the Professional Darts Corporation, with the 2012 edition having a prize fund over £175,000.

The format of the tournament is similar to the Premier League Darts tournament, also organized by the PDC, except it is contested by a larger pool of players who were divided into a number of groups.

Every match could be watched on one of the fifty-three bookmaker websites who broadcast the competition. The tournament was available globally through the internet, except in the United States of America where it could not be shown for legal reasons.

Phil Taylor won his third Championship League title be defeating Simon Whitlock 6–4 in the final.

== Format ==
The first group consisted of the top eight players from the PDC Order of Merit who were available for the competition. These eight players played each other over the course of a day, receiving two points for each win. All matches were contested over a maximum of 11 legs with a player winning the match on reaching 6 legs. After all players had played each other, the four players with the most points progressed to the semi-finals with the winners of those matches progressing into the final.

The winner of the final progressed to the winners group which took place at the end of the competition. The runner-up, losing semi-finalists and the players finishing fifth and sixth moved into group two, where they were joined by the next three players in the Order of Merit. The format of the second group was the same as the first group with players moving into the third group. In total there were 8 groups before the final group took place.

This format ensures that all players who do not win the group or finish in the last two positions have another chance to qualify for the winners group.

== Prize money ==
The Championship League Darts awards prize money per leg won, as well as to the eventual winner, runner-up and semi-finalists of the entire tournament.
The amount of prize money awarded per leg won is:

Stage	Match	Prize money per leg won
Group stage	Group matches	£50
Group stage	Semi-finals & final	£100
Winners group	Group matches	£100
Winners group	Semi-finals & final	£200

The amount of prize money awarded to the winner, runner-up and semi-finalists of the tournament is:

Stage	Prize money
Winner	£10,000
Runner-up	£5,000
Semi-finalists	£2,500

== Tournament dates ==
The tournament took place over nine days throughout September, October and November 2012. One group was played on each day. The dates were as follows:

- Group 1 – Tuesday 25 September
- Group 2 – Wednesday 26 September
- Group 3 – Thursday September 27
- Group 4 – Tuesday 16 October
- Group 5 – Wednesday 17 October
- Group 6 – Thursday 18 October
- Group 7 – Tuesday 30 October
- Group 8 – Wednesday 31 October
- Winners Group – Thursday 1 November

The tournament took place at the Crondon Park Golf Club in Essex.

Group 1

- (England) Phil Taylor
- (England) Adrian Lewis
- (England) James Wade
- (Scotland) Gary Anderson
- (England) Wes Newton
- (England) Andy Hamilton
- (Australia) Simon Whitlock
- (England) Terry Jenkins

Group 2

- (England) Phil Taylor
- (England) Adrian Lewis
- (Scotland) Gary Anderson
- (Australia) Simon Whitlock
- (England) Terry Jenkins
- (Wales) Mark Webster
- (England) Justin Pipe
- (England) Kevin Painter

Group 3

- (England) Phil Taylor
- (England) Adrian Lewis
- (Scotland) Gary Anderson
- (Australia) Simon Whitlock
- (England) Terry Jenkins
- (England) Dave Chisnall
- (England) Ronnie Baxter
- (England) Mark Walsh

Group 4

- (England) Phil Taylor
- (Australia) Simon Whitlock
- (England) Terry Jenkins
- (England) Dave Chisnall
- (England) Mark Walsh
- (Australia) Paul Nicholson
- (Netherlands) ~~Vincent van der Voort~~
- (England) Mervyn King
- (England) Andy Smith

Group 5

- (Australia) Simon Whitlock
- (England) Terry Jenkins
- (England) Dave Chisnall
- (England) Mark Walsh
- (Australia) Paul Nicholson
- (England) Colin Lloyd
- (Scotland) Robert Thornton
- (England) Wayne Jones

Group 6

- (England) Terry Jenkins
- (England) Dave Chisnall
- (England) Mark Walsh
- (Australia) Paul Nicholson
- (Scotland) Robert Thornton
- (England) Jamie Caven
- (Canada) John Part
- (England) Colin Osborne

Group 7

- (England) Mark Walsh
- (Australia) Paul Nicholson
- (Scotland) Robert Thornton
- (England) Jamie Caven
- (England) Colin Osborne
- (Netherlands) Michael van Gerwen
- (Northern Ireland) Brendan Dolan
- (Wales) Richie Burnett

Group 8

- (England) Mark Walsh
- (Australia) Paul Nicholson
- (Scotland) Robert Thornton
- (Netherlands) Michael van Gerwen
- (Northern Ireland) Brendan Dolan
- (England) Denis Ovens
- (Scotland) Peter Wright
- (England) Steve Beaton

Note: Raymond van Barneveld chose not to compete in the tournament. Vincent van der Voort withdrew due to medical issues, Andy Smith will take his place in group 4 with Steve Beaton taking up the new final spot in group 8.

Winners Group

- (England) Wes Newton
- (England) Justin Pipe
- (England) Ronnie Baxter
- (England) Phil Taylor
- (Australia) Simon Whitlock
- (England) Dave Chisnall
- (England) Jamie Caven
- (England) Mark Walsh

== Group stage ==
=== Group 1 ===
Group 1 was played on Tuesday 25 September. It was won by Wes Newton who qualified for the winners group. Andy Hamilton and James Wade were knocked out.

		Tay	Jen	New	Lew	And	Whi	Ham	Wad	Points, Legs
1	(England) Phil Taylor		6–4	4–6	5–6	6–3	6–5	6–4	6–2	10, 39–30
2	(England) Terry Jenkins	4–6		5–6	6–3	6–3	6–3	4–6	6–3	8, 37–30
3	(England) Wes Newton	6–4	6–5		1–6	4–6	5–6	6–2	6–2	8, 34–31
4	(England) Adrian Lewis	6–5	3–6	6–1		6–4	2–6	6–1	3–6	8, 32–29
5	(Scotland) Gary Anderson	3–6	3–6	6–4	4–6		6–4	6–3	6–5	8, 34–34
6	(Australia) Simon Whitlock	5–6	3–6	6–5	6–2	4–6		5–6	6–4	6, 35–35
7	(England) Andy Hamilton	4–6	6–4	2–6	1–6	3–6	6–5		6–3	6, 28–36
8	(England) James Wade	2–6	3–6	2–6	6–3	5–6	4–6	3–6		2, 25–39

Semi-final
1	(England) Phil Taylor	2
4	(England) Adrian Lewis	6
2	(England) Terry Jenkins	5
3	(England) Wes Newton	6

Final
4	(England) Adrian Lewis	3
3	(England) Wes Newton	6

=== Group 2 ===
Group 2 was played on Wednesday 26 September. It was won by Justin Pipe who qualified for the winners group. Mark Webster and Kevin Painter were knocked out.

		Tay	Jen	Pip	Lew	And	Whi	Pai	Web	Points, Legs
1	(England) Phil Taylor		4–6	6–2	6–0	6–2	6–2	6–3	6–4	12, 40–19
2	(England) Terry Jenkins	6–4		6–5	4–6	6–0	6–4	1–6	6–2	10, 35–27
3	(England) Justin Pipe	2–6	5–6		6–5	5–6	6–3	6–3	6–1	8, 36–30
4	(England) Adrian Lewis	0–6	6–4	5–6		6–4	1–6	6–3	6–1	8, 30–30
5	(Scotland) Gary Anderson	2–6	0–6	6–5	4–6		6–2	6–4	6–5	8, 30–34
6	(Australia) Simon Whitlock	2–6	4–6	3–6	6–1	2–6		6–3	6–4	6, 29–32
7	(England) Kevin Painter	3–6	6–1	3–6	3–6	4–6	3–6		6–5	4, 28–36
8	(Wales) Mark Webster	4–6	2–6	1–6	1–6	5–6	4–6	5–6		0, 22–42

Semi-final
1	(England) Phil Taylor	6
4	(England) Adrian Lewis	3
2	(England) Terry Jenkins	4
3	(England) Justin Pipe	6

Final
1	(England) Phil Taylor	5
3	(England) Justin Pipe	6

=== Group 3 ===
Group 3 was played on Thursday 27 September. It was won by Ronnie Baxter who qualified for the winners group. Adrian Lewis and Gary Anderson were knocked out.

		Wal	Whi	Chi	Bax	Tay	Jen	Lew	And	Points, Legs
1	(England) Mark Walsh		6–4	3–6	6–3	6–2	6–1	6–3	2–6	10, 35–25
2	(Australia) Simon Whitlock	4–6		6–5	3–6	6–1	6–3	6–3	6–4	10, 37–28
3	(England) Dave Chisnall	6–3	5–6		6–4	5–6	5–6	6–5	6–5	8, 39–35
4	(England) Ronnie Baxter	3–6	6–3	4–6		6–4	6–1	1–6	6–4	8, 32–30
5	(England) Phil Taylor	2–6	1–6	6–5	4–6		6–1	4–6	6–5	6, 29–35
6	(England) Terry Jenkins	1–6	3–6	6–5	1–6	1–6		6–5	6–4	6, 24–38
7	(England) Adrian Lewis	3–6	3–6	5–6	6–1	6–4	5–6		5–6	4, 33–35
8	(Scotland) Gary Anderson	6–2	4–6	5–6	4–6	5–6	4–6	6–5		4, 34–37

Semi-final
1	(England) Mark Walsh	3
4	(England) Ronnie Baxter	6
2	(Australia) Simon Whitlock	2
3	(England) Dave Chisnall	6

Final
4	(England) Ronnie Baxter	6
3	(England) Dave Chisnall	5

=== Group 4 ===
Group 4 was played on Tuesday 16 October. It was won by Phil Taylor who qualified for the winners group. Andy Smith and Mervyn King were knocked out.

		Tay	Chi	Wal	Nic	Jen	Whi	Smi	Kin	Points, Legs
1	(England) Phil Taylor		6–1	6–2	6–0	6–1	6–4	6–0	6–1	14, 42–9
2	(England) Dave Chisnall	1–6		6–3	6–5	6–4	6–4	6–4	6–5	12, 37–31
3	(England) Mark Walsh	2–6	3–6		6–5	5–6	6–5	6–3	6–3	8, 34–34
4	(Australia) Paul Nicholson	0–6	5–6	5–6		5–6	6–4	6–2	6–2	6, 33–32
5	(England) Terry Jenkins	1–6	4–6	6–5	6–5		6–5	4–6	1–6	6, 28–39
6	(Australia) Simon Whitlock	4–6	4–6	5–6	4–6	5–6		6–4	6–1	4, 34–35
7	(England) Andy Smith	0–6	4–6	3–6	2–6	6–4	4–6		6–1	4, 25–35
8	(England) Mervyn King	1–6	5–6	3–6	2–6	6–1	1–6	1–6		2, 19–37

Semi-final
1	(England) Phil Taylor	6
4	(Australia) Paul Nicholson	3
2	(England) Dave Chisnall	4
3	(England) Mark Walsh	6

Final
1	(England) Phil Taylor	6
3	(England) Mark Walsh	1

=== Group 5 ===
Played Wednesday October 17, was won by Simon Whitlock who qualifies for the winners group. Colin Lloyd and Wayne Jones were knocked out.

		Nic	Chi	Whi	Jen	Tho	Wal	Llo	Jon	Points, Legs
1	(Australia) Paul Nicholson		6–2	5–6	6–1	6–4	6–4	6–3	6–4	12, 41–24
2	(England) Dave Chisnall	2–6		6–2	6–3	6–5	6–2	6–2	6–1	12, 38–21
3	(Australia) Simon Whitlock	6–5	2–6		6–3	1–6	6–5	6–5	6–2	10, 33–32
4	(England) Terry Jenkins	1–6	3–6	3–6		6–3	6–5	6–4	6–4	8, 31–34
5	(Scotland) Robert Thornton	4–6	5–6	6–1	3–6		5–6	6–3	6–4	6, 35–32
6	(England) Mark Walsh	4–6	2–6	5–6	5–6	6–5		4–6	6–4	4, 32–39
7	(England) Colin Lloyd	3–6	2–6	5–6	4–6	3–6	6–4		4–6	2, 27–40
8	(England) Wayne Jones	4–6	1–6	2–6	4–6	4–6	4–6	6–4		2, 25–40

Semi-final
1	(Australia) Paul Nicholson	6
4	(England) Terry Jenkins	3
2	(England) Dave Chisnall	4
3	(Australia) Simon Whitlock	6

Final
1	(Australia) Paul Nicholson	3
3	(Australia) Simon Whitlock	6

=== Group 6 ===
Group 6 was played on Thursday 18 October. It was won by Dave Chisnall who qualified for the winners group. John Part and Terry Jenkins were knocked out.

		Cav	Chi	Tho	Wal	Osb	Nic	Par	Jen	Points, Legs
1	(England) Jamie Caven		5–6	6–5	6–1	6–3	6–4	6–4	6–3	12, 41–26
2	(England) Dave Chisnall	6–5		4–6	6–3	6–2	6–2	6–3	6–4	12, 40–25
3	(Scotland) Robert Thornton	5–6	6–4		6–3	3–6	6–3	4–6	6–4	8, 36–32
4	(England) Mark Walsh	1–6	3–6	3–6		6–5	6–5	6–4	6–4	8, 31–36
5	(England) Colin Osborne	3–6	2–6	6–3	5–6		6–4	6–4	4–6	6, 32–35
6	(Australia) Paul Nicholson	4–6	2–6	3–6	5–6	4–6		6–3	6–3	4, 30–36
7	(Canada) John Part	4–6	3–6	6–4	4–6	4–6	3–6		6–3	4, 30–37
8	(England) Terry Jenkins	3–6	4–6	4–6	4–6	6–4	3–6	3–6		2, 27–40

Semi-final
1	(England) Jamie Caven	1
4	(England) Mark Walsh	6
2	(England) Dave Chisnall	6
3	(Scotland) Robert Thornton	1

Final
4	(England) Mark Walsh	3
2	(England) Dave Chisnall	6

=== Group 7 ===
Group 7 was played on Tuesday 30 October. It was won by Jamie Caven who qualified for the winners group. Richie Burnett and Colin Osborne were knocked out.

		vnG	Tho	Cav	Nic	Dol	Wal	Bur	Osb	Points, Legs
1	(Netherlands) Michael van Gerwen		6–2	6–3	6–4	6–5	6–5	6–1	6–1	14, 42–21
2	(Scotland) Robert Thornton	2–6		6–1	6–3	6–4	5–6	6–4	6–2	10, 37–26
3	(England) Jamie Caven	3–6	1–6		6–5	5–6	6–4	6–2	6–4	8, 33–33
4	(Australia) Paul Nicholson	4–6	3–6	5–6		5–6	6–1	6–1	6–2	6, 35–28
5	(Northern Ireland) Brendan Dolan	5–6	4–6	6–5	6–5		4–6	3–6	6–2	6, 34–36
6	(England) Mark Walsh	5–6	6–5	4–6	1–6	6–4		3–6	6–1	6, 31–34
7	(Wales) Richie Burnett	1–6	4–6	2–6	1–6	6–3	6–3		6–1	6, 26–31
8	(England) Colin Osborne	1–6	2–6	4–6	2–6	2–6	1–6	1–6		0, 13–42

Semi-final
1	(Netherlands) Michael van Gerwen	3
4	(Australia) Paul Nicholson	6
2	(Scotland) Robert Thornton	2
3	(England) Jamie Caven	6

Final
4	(Australia) Paul Nicholson	4
3	(England) Jamie Caven	6

=== Group 8 ===
Group 8 was played on Wednesday 31 October. It was won by Mark Walsh who qualified for the winners group.

		vnG	Tho	Wal	Bea	Wri	Dol	Nic	Ove	Points, Legs
1	(Netherlands) Michael van Gerwen		5–6	6–3	6–0	6–3	6–5	6–3	6–3	12, 41–23
2	(Scotland) Robert Thornton	6–5		6–4	6–5	2–6	6–4	6–2	6–1	12, 38–27
3	(England) Mark Walsh	3–6	4–6		6–3	6–4	6–4	6–4	6–1	10, 37–28
4	(England) Steve Beaton	0–6	6–2	4–6		2–6	6–3	6–5	6–2	8, 30–30
5	(Scotland) Peter Wright	3–6	5–6	3–6	6–2		6–3	4–6	6–3	6, 33–32
6	(Northern Ireland) Brendan Dolan	5–6	4–6	3–6	4–6	3–6		6–1	6–3	4, 31–34
7	(Australia) Paul Nicholson	3–6	2–6	4–6	6–4	5–6	1–6		6–2	4, 27–36
8	(England) Denis Ovens	3–6	1–6	1–6	3–6	2–6	3–6	2–6		0, 15–42

Semi-final
1	(Netherlands) Michael van Gerwen	5
4	(England) Steve Beaton	6
2	(Scotland) Robert Thornton	2
3	(England) Mark Walsh	6

Final
4	(England) Steve Beaton	5
3	(England) Mark Walsh	6

== Winners group ==
The winners group was played on Thursday 1 November. It was won by Phil Taylor.

		Tay	Cav	Whi	Chi	Pip	Bax	New	Wal	Points, Legs
1	(England) Phil Taylor		6–2	6–4	6–4	6–5	6–4	6–5	6–0	14, 42–24
2	(England) Jamie Caven	2–6		3–6	6–4	6–4	6–4	6–3	6–4	10, 35–31
3	(Australia) Simon Whitlock	4–6	6–3		6–4	3–6	6–4	3–6	6–4	8, 34–33
4	(England) Dave Chisnall	4–6	4–6	4–6		6–2	5–6	6–4	6–2	6, 35–32
5	(England) Justin Pipe	5–6	4–6	6–3	2–6		6–1	6–4	4–6	6, 33–32
6	(England) Ronnie Baxter	4–6	4–6	4–6	6–5	1–6		6–4	6–3	6, 31–36
7	(England) Wes Newton	5–6	3–6	6–3	4–6	4–6	4–6		6–4	4, 32–37
8	(England) Mark Walsh	0–6	4–6	4–6	2–6	6–4	3–6	4–6		2, 23–40

Semi-final
1	(England) Phil Taylor	6
4	(England) Dave Chisnall	0
2	(England) Jamie Caven	4
3	(Australia) Simon Whitlock	6

Final
1	(England) Phil Taylor	6
3	(Australia) Simon Whitlock	4
