= 2008 European Championship (darts) =

2008 PartyPoker.net European Championship

Tournament information
- Dates: 30 October–2 November 2008
- Venue: Südbahnhof
- Location: Frankfurt
- Country: Germany
- Organisation(s): PDC
- Format: Legs; Final – best of 21
- Prize fund: £200,000
- Winner's share: £50,000
- High checkout: 161 (England) Wayne Jones (first round)

Champion(s)
- (England) Phil Taylor

The 2008 PartyPoker.net European Championship was the inaugural edition of the Professional Darts Corporation tournament, which thereafter was promoted as the annual European Championship, matching top European players qualifying to play against the highest ranked players from the PDC Order of Merit.

Played from 30 October–2 November 2008 at the Südbahnhof in Frankfurt, Germany, the inaugural tournament featured a field of 32 players and £200,000 in prize money, with a £50,000 winner's purse going to Phil Taylor.

== Format ==
First round — best of nine legs (by two legs)
Second round — best of seventeen legs (ditto)
Quarter-finals — best of seventeen legs (ditto)
Semi-finals — best of twenty-one legs (ditto)
Final — best of twenty-one legs (ditto)

Each game had to be won by two clear legs, except that a game went to a sudden death leg if a further six legs did not separate the players; for example, a first round match played out to 7-7 is then decided with one sudden death leg.

== Prize money ==
A total of £200,000 was on offer to the players, divided based on the following performances:

Position (no. of players)		Prize money (Total: £200,000)
Winner	(1)	£50,000
Runner-Up	(1)	£25,000
Semi-finalists	(2)	£12,500
Quarter-finalists	(4)	£8,500
Last 16 (second round)	(8)	£4,000
Last 32 (first round)	(16)	£2,000
Highest checkout	(1)	£2,000

== Qualification ==
The top 16 players from the PDC Order of Merit after the 2008 Sky Poker World Grand Prix automatically qualified for the event. Then the top 8 non-qualified players from the 2008 Players Championship Order of Merit after the October German Darts Trophy in Dinslaken, Germany joined them to make a field of 24.

The main European contingent then came from the following: the leading 4 non-qualified players from the 2008 Continental Europe Order of Merit following the October German Darts Trophy in Dinslaken, the top two non-qualified players from the German Darts Corporation rankings on October 25, and the last two places from a qualifier event held in Dinslaken on October 26 - an event which was open to any player with a full PDPA membership.

PDC Top 16
1. (England) Phil Taylor (champion)
2. (Netherlands) Raymond van Barneveld (quarter-finals)
3. (England) James Wade (second round)
4. (Canada) John Part (first round)
5. (England) Terry Jenkins (first round)
6. (England) Colin Lloyd (first round)
7. (England) Andy Hamilton (first round)
8. (England) Wayne Mardle (second round)
9. (England) Adrian Lewis (runner-up)
10. (England) Alan Tabern (quarter-finals)
11. (England) Dennis Priestley (second round)
12. (Netherlands) Roland Scholten (first round)
13. (England) Mervyn King (second round)
14. (England) Colin Osborne (first round)
15. (England) Ronnie Baxter (quarter-finals)
16. (England) Peter Manley (semi-finals)

Players Championship qualifiers
1. (England) Denis Ovens (second round)
2. (Scotland) Robert Thornton (semi-finals)
3. (England) Mark Walsh (quarter-finals)
4. (England) Chris Mason (first round)
5. (England) Kevin Painter (first round)
6. (Netherlands) Vincent van der Voort (first round)
7. (England) Alex Roy (first round)
8. (England) Wayne Jones (first round)
European qualifiers
1. (Spain) Carlos Rodríguez (second round)
2. (Austria) Mensur Suljović (second round)
3. (Netherlands) Jelle Klaasen (second round)
4. (Netherlands) Jan van der Rassel (first round)

German Darts Corporation qualifiers
1. (Germany) Andree Welge (first round)
2. (Austria) Hannes Schnier (first round)
Dinslaken event qualifiers
- (Republic of Ireland) Jacko Barry (first round)
- (England) Andy Jenkins (first round)

== Draw and results ==
First round (best of 9 legs); 30-31 October
1	(England) Phil Taylor 105.98	5
(Republic of Ireland) Jacko Barry 79.44	1
(England) Mervyn King 101.19	6
(England) Wayne Jones 95.13	4
8	(England) Wayne Mardle 89.46	5
(Germany) Andree Welge 71.26	0
(England) Colin Osborne 95.46	4
(England) Mark Walsh 104.01	6
5	(England) Terry Jenkins 95.74	5
(Spain) Carlos Rodriguez 93.92	7
(England) Ronnie Baxter 85.74	6
(Netherlands) Vincent van der Voort 93.39	4
4	(Canada) John Part 90.07	3
(Scotland) Robert Thornton 94.43	5
(Netherlands) Roland Scholten 51.57	1
(Austria) Mensur Suljović 81.11	5
2	(Netherlands) Raymond van Barneveld 88.38	5
(England) Andy Jenkins 78.98	2
(England) Dennis Priestley 93.43	5
(Netherlands) Jan van der Rassel 79.13	3
7	(England) Andy Hamilton 94.81	1
(England) Denis Ovens 95.97	5
(England) Adrian Lewis 93.27	5
(Austria) Hannes Schnier 77.86	2
6	(England) Colin Lloyd 84.79	2
(Netherlands) Jelle Klaasen 96.75	5
(England) Alan Tabern 94.29	5
(England) Chris Mason 90.28	1
3	(England) James Wade 94.18	5
(England) Alex Roy 85.84	1
(England) Peter Manley 88.29	5
(England) Kevin Painter 92.08	2

Second round (best of 17 legs); 1 November
1	(England) Phil Taylor 113.92	9
(England) Mervyn King 101.31	3
8	(England) Wayne Mardle 92.74	6
(England) Mark Walsh 96.76	9
(Spain) Carlos Rodriguez 86.03	5
(England) Ronnie Baxter 87.46	9
(Scotland) Robert Thornton 91.77	9
(Austria) Mensur Suljović 89.47	7
2	(Netherlands) Raymond van Barneveld 107.02	9
(England) Dennis Priestley 102.35	4
(England) Denis Ovens 87.98	5
(England) Adrian Lewis 89.53	9
(Netherlands) Jelle Klaasen 97.87	6
(England) Alan Tabern 93.56	9
3	(England) James Wade 88.53	9
(England) Peter Manley 89.23	11

Quarter-finals (best of 17 legs); 2 November
1	(England) Phil Taylor 103.27	9
(England) Mark Walsh 95.51	5
(England) Ronnie Baxter 89.61	5
(Scotland) Robert Thornton 92.26	9
2	(Netherlands) Raymond van Barneveld 102.49	2
(England) Adrian Lewis 108.62	9
(England) Alan Tabern 85.51	4
(England) Peter Manley 85.77	9

Semi-finals (best of 21 legs); 2 November
1	(England) Phil Taylor 113.33	11
(Scotland) Robert Thornton 102.12	7
(England) Adrian Lewis 92.06	11
(England) Peter Manley 90.45	7

Final (best of 21 legs); 2 November
1	(England) Phil Taylor 104.35	11
(England) Adrian Lewis 96.56	5

Scores after player's names are three-dart averages (total points scored divided by darts thrown and multiplied by 3)

All games had to be won by 2 clear legs, if after six more legs the players still couldn't be separated, a sudden death leg would take place to decide the winner. i.e. if Round One matches went 7-7, there would have been a decider.

== Television coverage and sponsorship ==
The PDC announced on 12 August 2008 that ITV4 would broadcast the entire event live. This was the second PDC darts tournament that ITV4 has broadcast, after the inaugural Grand Slam of Darts - after its rating success ITV chose to broadcast this event as well as the 2008 Grand Slam of Darts.

The tournament was sponsored by PartyPoker.net, which has also sponsored other darts championships: the US Open, the Las Vegas Desert Classic and the German Darts Championship.
