= 2009 World Grand Prix (darts) =

2009 Skybet World Grand Prix

Tournament information
- Dates: 5–11 October 2009
- Venue: Citywest Hotel
- Location: Dublin, Ireland
- Organisation(s): Professional Darts Corporation (PDC)
- Format: Sets "double in, double out" Final – best of 11
- Prize fund: £350,000
- Winner's share: £100,000
- High checkout: 167 Adrian Lewis

Champion(s)
- Phil Taylor (ENG)

The 2009 Skybet World Grand Prix was the twelfth instance of the darts tournament held by the Professional Darts Corporation, the World Grand Prix. It was held from 5 to 11 October 2009. It was staged at the Citywest Hotel in Dublin, Ireland. The event featured a tournament record prize fund of £350,000 with £100,000 going to the winner.

Phil Taylor successfully defended his title, beating Raymond van Barneveld 6-3 in the final to win the World Grand Prix for the ninth time.

== Format ==
The tournament's usual format was in play with the usual 501 legs double-in double-out format (the World Grand Prix remains the only televised darts tournament to use the double-in format). The first round's games were best of 3 sets - the quickfire nature of this round means shocks are frequent in this round, not least involving eight-time champion Phil Taylor who, three times, has gone out in the first round here. Second round games were best of 5 sets, the quarter-finals best of 7 sets, the semi-finals best of 9 sets, and the final was best of 11 sets. All sets were best of 5 legs/first to three legs.

== Prize money ==
A tournament record prize fund of £350,000 was available to the participants, divided based on the following performances:

Position (num. of players)		Prize money (Total: £350,000)
Winner	(1)	£100,000
Runner-Up	(1)	£40,000
Semi-finalists	(2)	£20,000
Quarter-finalists	(4)	£12,500
Second round losers	(8)	£7,000
First round losers	(16)	£4,000

== Qualification ==
The field of 32 players was mostly made up from the top 16 players in the PDC Order of Merit on September 7, following the two Players Championship events in Salzburg, Austria. The top 8 from these rankings were also the seeded players. The remaining 16 places went to the top 12 non-qualified players from the 2009 Players Championship Order of Merit, and then to the top 4 non-qualified residents of the Republic of Ireland and Northern Ireland from the 2009 Players Championship Order of Merit who have competed in at least six Players Championship events.

PDC Top 16
1. (England) Phil Taylor (winner)
2. (England) James Wade (first round)
3. (Netherlands) Raymond van Barneveld (runner-up)
4. (Canada) John Part (first round)
5. (England) Terry Jenkins (semi-finals)
6. (England) Ronnie Baxter (first round)
7. (England) Mervyn King (second round)
8. (England) Adrian Lewis (quarter-finals)
9. (England) Colin Lloyd (second round)
10. (England) Dennis Priestley (second round)
11. (England) Alan Tabern (first round)
12. (England) Colin Osborne (first round)
13. (England) Mark Walsh (first round)
14. (England) Wayne Mardle (first round)
15. (England) Kevin Painter (quarter-finals)
16. (England) Andy Hamilton (semi-finals)

PDPA Players Championship qualifiers
1. (Scotland) Gary Anderson (second round)
2. (Scotland) Robert Thornton (first round)
3. (England) Jamie Caven (first round)
4. (England) Steve Beaton (second round)
5. (England) Wayne Jones (second round)
6. (England) Andy Smith (quarter-finals)
7. (Netherlands) Vincent van der Voort (first round)
8. (England) Mark Dudbridge (second round)
9. (Netherlands) Michael van Gerwen (first round)
10. (Australia) Paul Nicholson (first round)
11. (England) Wes Newton (second round)
12. (England) Denis Ovens (first round)

Irish qualifiers
1. (Northern Ireland) Brendan Dolan (first round)
2. (Northern Ireland) John MaGowan (first round)
3. (Republic of Ireland) Mick McGowan (first round)
4. (Republic of Ireland) Jacko Barry (quarter-finals)

== Draw ==
First round (best of 3 sets); 5–6 October
1	(England) Phil Taylor 98.33	2
(Northern Ireland) Brendan Dolan 86.01	0
(England) Wayne Jones 85.64	2
(Australia) Paul Nicholson 82.92	1
8	(England) Adrian Lewis 89.15	2
(Scotland) Robert Thornton 74.41	0
(Northern Ireland) John MaGowan 82.44	0
(Scotland) Gary Anderson 96.86	2
5	(England) Terry Jenkins 88.39	2
(England) Wayne Mardle 69.63	0
(England) Denis Ovens 83.76	1
(England) Mark Dudbridge 89.24	2
4	(Canada) John Part 86.44	0
(England) Colin Lloyd 94.63	2
(England) Andy Smith 83.83	2
(Netherlands) Vincent van der Voort 84.59	1
2	(England) James Wade 92.17	1
(England) Dennis Priestley 96.47	2
(England) Kevin Painter 80.36	2
(Netherlands) Michael van Gerwen 79.23	0
7	(England) Mervyn King 85.34	2
(England) Colin Osborne 81.60	0
(England) Andy Hamilton 89.53	2
(England) Mark Walsh 87.55	1
6	(England) Ronnie Baxter 73.97	0
(England) Steve Beaton 79.59	2
(Republic of Ireland) Jacko Barry 77.45	2
(Republic of Ireland) Mick McGowan 72.33	0
3	(Netherlands) Raymond van Barneveld 87.06	2
(England) Alan Tabern 81.56	1
(England) Wes Newton 94.65	2
(England) Jamie Caven 85.55	0

Second round (best of 5 sets); 7–8 October
1	(England) Phil Taylor 99.37	3
(England) Wayne Jones 89.31	0
8	(England) Adrian Lewis 90.86	3
(Scotland) Gary Anderson 85.81	2
5	(England) Terry Jenkins 93.47	3
(England) Mark Dudbridge 89.97	1
(England) Colin Lloyd 87.62	2
(England) Andy Smith 81.92	3
(England) Dennis Priestley 79.61	1
(England) Kevin Painter 79.83	3
7	(England) Mervyn King 84.38	0
(England) Andy Hamilton 89.51	3
(England) Steve Beaton 77.74	2
(Republic of Ireland) Jacko Barry 80.13	3
3	(Netherlands) Raymond van Barneveld 84.79	3
(England) Wes Newton 82.23	2

Quarter-finals (best of 7 sets); 9 October
1	(England) Phil Taylor 98.59	4
8	(England) Adrian Lewis 89.29	0
5	(England) Terry Jenkins 86.04	4
(England) Andy Smith 87.00	0
(England) Kevin Painter 85.76	1
(England) Andy Hamilton 87.05	4
(Republic of Ireland) Jacko Barry 76.44	0
3	(Netherlands) Raymond van Barneveld 90.85	4

Semi-finals (best of 9 sets); 10 October
1	(England) Phil Taylor 99.76	5
5	(England) Terry Jenkins 85.67	2
(England) Andy Hamilton 88.29	2
3	(Netherlands) Raymond van Barneveld 87.72	5

Final (best of 11 sets); 11 October
1	(England) Phil Taylor 97.07	6
3	(Netherlands) Raymond van Barneveld 86.62	3

== Statistics ==
Player	Played	Sets Won	Sets Lost	Legs Won	Legs Lost	LWAT	100+	140+	180s	High Checkout	3-dart Average
(England) Phil Taylor	5	20	5	68	36	21	143	88	28	164	98.62
(England) James Wade	1	1	2	6	7	2	17	9	4	76	92.17
(Scotland) Gary Anderson	2	4	3	17	13	8	40	18	12	100	91.34
(England) Colin Lloyd	2	4	3	17	13	6	45	23	3	156	91.13
(England) Adrian Lewis	3	5	6	25	24	10	62	25	13	167	89.77
(England) Mark Dudbridge	2	3	4	15	14	5	33	15	13	88	89.61
(England) Andy Hamilton	4	11	7	42	34	15	92	42	11	149	88.60
(England) Wes Newton	2	4	3	18	13	5	36	19	6	141	88.44
(England) Terry Jenkins	4	11	6	39	32	15	103	49	17	116	88.39
(England) Dennis Priestley	2	3	4	12	16	3	45	21	4	125	88.04
(England) Mark Walsh	1	1	2	6	8	2	23	9	0	84	87.55
(England) Wayne Jones	2	2	4	11	14	3	35	18	2	114	87.48
(Netherlands) Raymond van Barneveld	5	17	11	59	59	17	149	58	24	130	87.41
(Canada) John Part	1	0	2	2	6	2	8	5	1	79	86.44
(Northern Ireland) Brendan Dolan	1	0	2	2	6	0	8	5	2	55	86.01
(England) Jamie Caven	1	0	2	2	6	1	7	5	1	65	85.55
(England) Mervyn King	2	2	3	8	13	3	19	14	4	76	84.86
(Netherlands) Vincent van der Voort	1	1	2	7	7	3	22	6	2	136	84.59
(England) Andy Smith	3	5	7	23	30	25	59	25	12	105	84.25
(England) Denis Ovens	1	1	2	4	7	1	14	1	4	66	83.76
(Australia) Paul Nicholson	1	1	2	5	8	1	15	4	4	120	82.92
(Northern Ireland) John Magowan	1	0	2	1	6	1	12	4	1	100	82.44
(England) Kevin Painter	3	6	5	25	21	10	35	35	13	140	81.98
(England) Colin Osborne	1	0	2	4	6	2	11	7	1	78	81.60
(England) Alan Tabern	1	1	2	6	6	1	17	8	1	92	81.56
(Netherlands) Michael van Gerwen	1	0	2	3	6	1	11	5	1	50	79.23
(England) Steve Beaton	2	4	3	15	12	5	33	15	4	141	78.67
(Republic of Ireland) Jacko Barry	3	5	6	22	25	7	63	24	4	92	78.01
(Scotland) Robert Thornton	1	0	2	1	6	0	8	3	1	72	74.41
(England) Ronnie Baxter	1	0	2	1	6	0	11	1	1	40	73.97
(Republic of Ireland) Mick McGowan	1	0	2	4	6	2	11	7	0	38	72.33
(England) Wayne Mardle	1	0	2	2	6	1	6	5	1	48	69.63

== Television coverage and sponsorship ==
As usual and since its inception the tournament was screened by Sky Sports.

The tournament was sponsored for the last time by Sky Bet after five years.
