= 2008 World Grand Prix (darts) =

2008 Sky Poker World Grand Prix

Tournament information
- Dates: 6–12 October 2008
- Venue: Citywest Hotel
- Location: Dublin, Ireland
- Organisation(s): Professional Darts Corporation (PDC)
- Format: Sets "double in, double out"
- Prize fund: £250,000
- Winner's share: £50,000
- High checkout: 170 Raymond van Barneveld

Champion(s)
- Phil Taylor (ENG)

The 2008 Sky Poker World Grand Prix was the eleventh World Grand Prix darts tournament held by the Professional Darts Corporation. It was held from 6 to 12 October 2008 at the Citywest Hotel in Dublin, Ireland. The event featured a tournament record prize fund of £250,000 with £50,000 going to the winner.

Phil Taylor won his eighth Grand Prix title with a 6–2 victory over Raymond van Barneveld in the final watched by 355,000 viewers. James Wade was the defending champion, however lost 2–1 to Tony Eccles in the first round.

== Format ==
All legs were 501 points double-in double-out format. The first-round games were best of three sets. Second round games were best of five sets, the quarter-finals best of seven sets, the semi-finals best of nine sets, and the final was best of eleven sets. All sets were best of five legs/first to three legs.

== Prize money ==
A tournament record prize fund of £250,000 was available to the participants, divided based on the following performances:

Position (num. of players)		Prize money (Total: £250,000)
Winner	(1)	£50,000
Runner-Up	(1)	£25,000
Semi-finalists	(2)	£14,500
Quarter-finalists	(4)	£10,000
Second round losers	(8)	£6,750
First round losers	(16)	£3,250
Nine-dart finish	(0)	£15,000

== Qualification ==
The field of 32 players was mostly made up from the top sixteen players in the PDC Order of Merit on September 21, following the two Players Championship events at the Newport Center in Newport, Wales. The top eight from these rankings were also the seeded players. The remaining sixteen places went to the top twelve non-qualified players from the 2008 Players Championship Order of Merit, and then to the top four non-qualified residents of the Republic of Ireland and Northern Ireland from the 2008 Players Championship Order of Merit who have competed in at least six Players Championship events.

PDC Top 16
1. (England) Phil Taylor (winner)
2. (Netherlands) Raymond van Barneveld (runner-up)
3. (England) James Wade (first round)
4. (Canada) John Part (quarter-finals)
5. (England) Terry Jenkins (semi-finals)
6. (England) Wayne Mardle (second round)
7. (England) Colin Lloyd (quarter-finals)
8. (England) Andy Hamilton (quarter-finals)
9. (England) Adrian Lewis (second round)
10. (England) Alan Tabern (first round)
11. (Netherlands) Roland Scholten (first round)
12. (England) Dennis Priestley (quarter-finals)
13. (England) Peter Manley (first round)
14. (England) Ronnie Baxter (first round)
15. (England) Colin Osborne (second round)
16. (England) Mervyn King (semi-finals)

PDPA Players Championship qualifiers
1. (England) Chris Mason (first round)
2. (England) Denis Ovens (first round)
3. (Scotland) Robert Thornton (second round)
4. (England) Kevin Painter (second round)
5. (England) Mark Walsh (second round)
6. (Netherlands) Vincent van der Voort (first round)
7. (England) Wayne Jones (first round)
8. (England) Mark Dudbridge (first round)
9. (England) Andy Smith (first round)
10. (England) Tony Eccles (second round)
11. (Northern Ireland) Felix McBrearty (first round)
12. (England) Steve Beaton (first round)

Irish qualifiers
1. (Republic of Ireland) Mick McGowan (first round)
2. (Northern Ireland) John MaGowan (first round)
3. (Northern Ireland) Brendan Dolan (first round)
4. (Republic of Ireland) Jacko Barry (second round)

== Draw ==
Draw and schedule of play was as follows:

First round (best of 3 sets); 6–7 October
1	(England) Phil Taylor 96.72	2
(England) Ronnie Baxter 84.62	0
(Northern Ireland) John MaGowan 78.47	1
(England) Colin Osborne 89.01	2
8	(England) Andy Hamilton 85.09	2
(England) Andy Smith 86.36	1
(Scotland) Robert Thornton 89.36	2
(England) Peter Manley 81.16	0
5	(England) Terry Jenkins 80.44	2
(Republic of Ireland) Mick McGowan 73.20	0
(England) Mark Walsh 85.84	2
(England) Steve Beaton 79.84	1
4	(Canada) John Part 79.63	2
(England) Chris Mason 74.46	0
(Republic of Ireland) Jacko Barry 82.44	2
(Northern Ireland) Brendan Dolan 79.53	1
2	(Netherlands) Raymond van Barneveld 93.00	2
(England) Alan Tabern 88.06	1
(England) Adrian Lewis 75.86	2
(Netherlands) Roland Scholten 78.57	1
7	(England) Colin Lloyd 79.77	2
(Netherlands) Vincent van der Voort 77.07	1
(England) Mark Dudbridge 74.08	0
(England) Kevin Painter 78.57	2
6	(England) Wayne Mardle 83.36	2
(Northern Ireland) Felix McBrearty 71.07	0
(England) Dennis Priestley 81.87	2
(England) Denis Ovens 80.29	0
3	(England) James Wade 80.71	1
(England) Tony Eccles 85.68	2
(England) Mervyn King 80.62	2
(England) Wayne Jones 83.96	1

Second round (best of 5 sets); 8–9 October
1	(England) Phil Taylor 100.20	3
(England) Colin Osborne 77.98	0
8	(England) Andy Hamilton 85.10	3
(Scotland) Robert Thornton 79.21	2
5	(England) Terry Jenkins 92.72	3
(England) Mark Walsh 79.71	0
4	(Canada) John Part 80.47	3
(Republic of Ireland) Jacko Barry 77.87	0
2	(Netherlands) Raymond van Barneveld 90.72	3
(England) Adrian Lewis 88.38	2
7	(England) Colin Lloyd 80.90	3
(England) Kevin Painter 80.57	2
6	(England) Wayne Mardle 77.11	2
(England) Dennis Priestley 78.52	3
(England) Tony Eccles 84.10	2
(England) Mervyn King 83.34	3

Quarter-finals (best of 7 sets); 10 October
1	(England) Phil Taylor 98.60	4
8	(England) Andy Hamilton 91.35	1
5	(England) Terry Jenkins 81.89	4
4	(Canada) John Part 85.35	2
2	(Netherlands) Raymond van Barneveld 85.27	4
7	(England) Colin Lloyd 75.83	1
(England) Dennis Priestley 85.26	2
(England) Mervyn King 83.88	4

Semi-finals (best of 9 sets); 11 October
1	(England) Phil Taylor 99.17	5
5	(England) Terry Jenkins 83.35	0
2	(Netherlands) Raymond van Barneveld 89.12	5
(England) Mervyn King 73.18	0

Final (best of 11 sets); 12 October
1	(England) Phil Taylor 97.81	6
2	(Netherlands) Raymond van Barneveld 90.42	2

== Television coverage and sponsorship ==
The tournament was screened by Sky Sports.

The sponsorship for the tournament was Sky Bet who had sponsored the event since 2004, however one of its brands, Sky Poker, was the new title sponsor.
