= 2006 World Matchplay =

2006 Stan James World Matchplay

Tournament information
- Dates: 23–29 July 2006
- Venue: Winter Gardens
- Location: Blackpool, England
- Organisation(s): Professional Darts Corporation (PDC)
- Format: Legs
- Prize fund: £150,000
- Winner's share: £30,000
- High checkout: 160; Phil Taylor; Andy Jenkins

Champion(s)
- Phil Taylor (ENG)

The 2006 Stan James World Matchplay was the 13th staging of the World Matchplay darts tournament, organised by the Professional Darts Corporation. It was held at the Winter Gardens, Blackpool, between 23 and 29 July 2006.

Phil Taylor won the title for the eighth time, by defeating James Wade 18–11 in the final.

== Prize money ==
The prize fund increased by £30,000 on the previous year, with the winner now receiving £30,000.

Position (no. of players)		Prize money (Total: £150,000)
Winner	(1)	£30,000
Runner-Up	(1)	£15,000
Semi-finalists	(2)	£10,000
Quarter-finalists	(4)	£6,250
Second round	(8)	£3,500
First round	(16)	£2,000

== Seeds ==
The World Matchplay featured sixteen seeds.

1. (England) Phil Taylor
2. (England) Colin Lloyd
3. (England) Ronnie Baxter
4. (England) Peter Manley
5. (England) Wayne Mardle
6. (England) Andy Jenkins
7. (England) Kevin Painter
8. (England) Dennis Priestley
9. (England) Mark Dudbridge
10. (England) Denis Ovens
11. (Netherlands) Roland Scholten
12. (England) Terry Jenkins
13. (England) Adrian Lewis
14. (England) Mark Walsh
15. (England) Chris Mason
16. (Canada) John Part

== Draw ==
Players in bold denote match winners.

**First round** (best of 19 legs); 23–25 July
1	(England) **Phil Taylor** 97.46	**10**
(England) Bob Anderson 87.89	5
16	(Canada) **John Part** 88.35	**10**
(England) Wes Newton 82.38	2
8	(England) **Dennis Priestley** 90.84	**10**
(England) Alan Tabern 86.73	7
9	(England) Mark Dudbridge 81.15	6
(England) **Alex Roy** 84.37	**10**
5	(England) **Wayne Mardle** 91.73	**10**
(England) Steve Hine 85.17	5
12	(England) Terry Jenkins 83.98	7
(England) **Lionel Sams** 81.84	**10**
4	(England) Peter Manley 81.60	2
(England) **Andy Hamilton** 95.36	**10**
13	(England) **Adrian Lewis** 94.95	**10**
(England) Matt Clark 92.90	6
2	(England) Colin Lloyd 90.28	6
(England) **Steve Maish** 89.40	**10**
15	(England) **Chris Mason** 87.24	**10**
(England) Steve Beaton 87.65	6
7	(England) **Kevin Painter** 81.62	**10**
(Wales) Barrie Bates 84.44	8
10	(England) Denis Ovens 88.61	1
(England) **James Wade** 96.81	**10**
6	(England) **Andy Jenkins** 86.21	**11**
(England) Alan Warriner-Little 84.48	9
11	(Netherlands) **Roland Scholten** 91.95	**10**
(England) Andy Smith 82.64	6
3	(England) **Ronnie Baxter** 89.11	**10**
(England) Dennis Smith 75.88	4
14	(England) **Mark Walsh** 82.48	**10**
(England) Dave Askew 81.85	8

**Second round** (best of 25 legs); 25–26 July
1	(England) **Phil Taylor** 98.57	**13**
16	(Canada) John Part 83.39	2
8	(England) **Dennis Priestley** 86.39	**13**
(England) Alex Roy 87.82	8
5	(England) **Wayne Mardle** 85.65	**13**
(England) Lionel Sams 86.25	10
(England) **Andy Hamilton** 91.90	**15**
13	(England) Adrian Lewis 91.95	13
(England) Steve Maish 86.76	7
15	(England) **Chris Mason** 85.21	**13**
7	(England) Kevin Painter 84.81	9
(England) **James Wade** 91.24	**13**
6	(England) Andy Jenkins 87.81	8
11	(Netherlands) **Roland Scholten** 90.08	**13**
3	(England) **Ronnie Baxter** 90.14	**13**
14	(England) Mark Walsh 83.75	9

**Quarter-finals** (best of 31 legs); 27 July
1	(England) **Phil Taylor** 99.13	**16**
8	(England) Dennis Priestley 94.45	13
5	(England) Wayne Mardle 89.24	9
(England) **Andy Hamilton** 96.76	**16**
15	(England) Chris Mason 91.41	4
(England) **James Wade** 97.24	**16**
11	(Netherlands) **Roland Scholten** 93.31	**16**
3	(England) Ronnie Baxter 88.81	13

**Semi-finals** (best of 33 legs); 28 July
1	(England) **Phil Taylor** 102.58	**17**
(England) Andy Hamilton 101.88	11
(England) **James Wade** 94.38	**19**
11	(Netherlands) Roland Scholten 92.01	17

**Final** (best of 35 legs); 29 July
1	(England) **Phil Taylor** 100.08	**18**
(England) James Wade 90.01	11
