= Mark Walsh (darts player) =

English darts player

Personal information
- Nickname: "Special Brew"
- Born: 2 February 1965 (age 61) Kings Langley, Hertfordshire, England
- Home town: Abbots Langley, Hertfordshire, England

Sport
- Sport: Darts
- Playing since: 1995
- Darts: 24g Target Darts Mark Walsh Range
- Laterality: Right-handed
- Walk-on music: "Special Brew" by Bad Manners

Organisation (see split in darts)
- PDC: 2002–2020

WDF major events – best performances
- World Trophy: Last 56: 2007

PDC premier events – best performances
- World Championship: Last 16: 2011, 2013
- World Matchplay: Last 16: 2005, 2006, 2008, 2009, 2010, 2011, 2012
- World Grand Prix: Last 16: 2003, 2004, 2008, 2010
- UK Open: Runner-up: 2005
- Grand Slam: Semi-finals: 2011
- European Championship: Quarter-finals: 2008, 2009, 2010
- Championship League: Winners group, Semi-finals 2008
- Desert Classic: Last 16: 2005, 2008
- US Open/WSoD: Quarter-finals: 2010
- PC Finals: Quarter-finals: 2011

Other tournament wins
- Years
Gleneagle Irish Masters	2007, 2011
Players Championships
Players Championship (BAR)	2009
Players Championship (DER)	2010
Players Championship (GER)	2009
Players Championship (MID)	2009
UK Open Regionals/Qualifiers
Regional Final (EMI)	2009
Regional Final (WAL)	2005
UK Open Qualifier	2010, 2010

Other achievements
- Nine dart finish, Eddie Cox Memorial Players Championship 2009

Mark Walsh (born 2 February 1965) is a former English professional darts player who competed in Professional Darts Corporation (PDC) tournaments. He reached No. 6 in the PDC Order of Merit.

Walsh reached his first major televised final in 2005, when he was beaten by Phil Taylor in the UK Open.

== Early career ==
Walsh made his televised debut at the 2002 World Matchplay but suffered a 10–0 whitewash at the hands of John Part.

His World Championship debut came in 2004, but he lost 0–3 to Erik Clarys in his first match. He went out to Wayne Mardle 2–4 in 2005. He won his first match at the World Championship at his third attempt in 2006. He was seeded 12th for the event, and beat Warren Parry before losing 0–4 to Dennis Smith in the next round.

== Later career ==
=== 2007–2010 ===
He had slipped to 16th in the world rankings for the 2007 World Championship, when he was surprisingly beaten by 19-year-old Dutch player Rico Vonck, thus continuing his poor run at the tournament. He started the year ranked 15th in the world, but had fallen to 32 by November, which put him in danger of failing to qualify for the 2008 World Championship. However, he reached the semi-final of the Ireland Open Classic in September, and won the non-ranked Gleneagle Irish Masters in early November, thus hinting at an upturn in form. He also reached the semi-finals of the PDC German Darts Championship. In the 2008 PDC World Darts Championship, Walsh defeated Adrian Gray in the first round, setting up a second-round match with Taylor. Walsh led Taylor 1–0, 2–1 and 3–2 before Taylor won six consecutive legs to beat him 4–3. Despite losing, Walsh stated that from suffering dartitis to pushing the greatest player in the world to the final set at the World Championship was a great victory in its own right.

Walsh continued his good form, reaching three quarter finals including the Open Holland Masters and then reached the last 32 stage of the US Open and the UK Open. He followed up with a semi final showing in the PDPA Players Championship Las Vegas and then qualified for the 2008 Las Vegas Desert Classic the next day. He beat Bill Davis in the first round before losing to James Wade. He then reached the second round of the 2008 World Matchplay, defeating Colin Lloyd in the opening match of the tournament but lost to Kevin McDine. He reached the second round of the World Grand Prix, beating Steve Beaton in the first round before losing to Terry Jenkins. Walsh missed out on qualifying for the 2008 Grand Slam of Darts but bounced back to reach the semi-finals of the inaugural Championship League Darts, winning group eight and then placing second in the winners group, eventually losing to Mervyn King. He then reached the quarter-finals of the 2008 European Darts Championship and reached the final of the PDPA Players Championship Holland 2, losing to Wade. Walsh defeated Jamie Caven 3–2 in the first round of the 2009 PDC World Championship, narrowly missing out on a nine dart finish on the way. In the second round he lost 4–2 to King. On 17 January, Walsh hit a nine-dart finish in the Eddie Cox Memorial Players Championship in Gibraltar against Caven to win the deciding leg of their first round match. Having rolled over for four Players Championships, Walsh won £1,600 for the nine-darter.

Walsh won his first PDC title in two years, when he won the Coventry Players Championship on 28 March 2009 beating Taylor 6–4 in the final. He added another title with his second career UK Open Regional in Derby, by winning the East Midlands region 6–5 over Raymond van Barneveld.

=== 2010 – present ===
Walsh was 12th seed for the 2010 World Championship, however he didn't get past the first round after losing 3–2 to former World Champion Mark Webster. Walsh qualified for the 2011 Grand Slam of Darts as the highest ranked player from the PDC Order of Merit not already invited. He progressed through Group A with victories over Tony O'Shea and Michael van Gerwen but finished second after losing to Scott Waites. He then defeated Group B winner Dean Winstanley 10–9 and former World Champion Ted Hankey 16–14 before losing out 11–16 to Gary Anderson. At the 2012 World Championship he came from a set down to defeat Warren French, 3–1 in the first round. Walsh played Kevin Painter in the Last 32 and came back from 1–3 to level the match at 3–3. He couldn't keep his momentum going, however, as he lost the deciding set by 3 legs to 0 to exit the tournament 3–4. At the World Matchplay, Walsh beat Colin Osborne 10–8 in the first round, before being comprehensively beaten 4–13 by James Wade in the last 16. Despite winning the first set in his first round match against Robert Thornton at the World Grand Prix, he only took one more leg and lost 1–2. Walsh qualified from Group 8 of the Championship League with a 6–5 victory against Steve Beaton. However, he finished bottom of the eight man Winners Group, winning just one of his seven matches. Walsh was whitewashed 0–5 in his opening Group H game of the Grand Slam of Darts, but came back to defeat both Wayne Jones and Christian Kist 5–4. However, his heavy defeat and narrow wins meant that he failed to qualify for the knockout stage on leg difference. After all 33 ProTour events of 2012 had been played, Walsh was 23rd on the Order of Merit, inside the top 32 who qualified for the Players Championship Finals. He was beaten 1–6 by Thornton in the first round. Walsh reached the last 16 of the 2013 World Championship with wins over Darren Webster and Justin Pipe, but then lost to Wes Newton 1–4, having missed three darts to only trail 2–3. He lost 4–5 to Lee Palfreyman in the second round of the UK Open. He failed to qualify for the World Matchplay for the first time in his career and the World Grand Prix for the first time since 2007 due to falling out of the top 16 on the Order of Merit and not winning enough games through the PDC Pro Tour. In October, Walsh reached the quarter-finals of a Pro Tour event for the first time in a year at the 11th Players Championship as he beat the likes of Andy Hamilton and Newton, before his run was ended with a 6–4 defeat against Robert Thornton. He lost 5–0 to Robert Thornton and 5–1 to Andy Hamilton at the Grand Slam of Darts, before a consolation 5–2 victory over Justin Pipe but Walsh was already resigned to finishing bottom of the group.

At the 2014 World Championship Walsh missed five darts to extend his first round match against Jarkko Komula into a final set as he lost 3–1. He dropped to world number 31 after the event concluded and was defeated 9–5 by Mark Webster in the third round of the UK Open. Walsh failed to advance beyond the last 32 of any event after this. He fell to world number 41 ahead of the 2015 World Championship, outside of the top 32 who automatically qualify and could not claim a place via any other route to break a streak of 11 consecutive appearances in the event. 2015 also marked the first UK Open not to feature Walsh (he had played in each one since its inception in 2003) after he failed to win enough matches to qualify. He did qualify for four European Tour events with two first round and two second round exits adding a total of £5,000 to his ranking.

Walsh was 65th on the Order of Merit after the 2016 World Championship, just outside the top 64 who remain on tour and so entered Q School. Despite losing in the final round to Vincent Kamphuis on the last day, Walsh had done more than enough to win his place back right away as he topped the Q School Order of Merit. At the 10th Players Championship in July, Walsh reached his first quarter-final in over two years, but lost 6–1 to Andrew Gilding. This helped him qualify for the Finals and, in what was his PDC major event since February 2014, he was edged out 6–5 by Josh Payne in the opening round.

== Successes ==
He has won six non-televised PDC titles: the Welsh Regional final of the UK Open in September 2005, the Gleneagle Irish Masters in November 2007, the Coventry Players Championship and the UK Open East Midlands Regional plus two more Players Championships in Barnsley beating Jamie Caven and in Germany beating Andy Hamilton 6–5.

== World Championship results ==
=== PDC ===
- 2004: Second round (lost to Erik Clarys 0–3) (sets)
- 2005: Third round (lost to Wayne Mardle 2–4)
- 2006: Second round (lost to Dennis Smith 0–4)
- 2007: First round (lost to Rico Vonck 0–3)
- 2008: Second round (lost to Phil Taylor 3–4)
- 2009: Second round (lost to Mervyn King 2–4)
- 2010: First round (lost to Mark Webster 2–3)
- 2011: Third round (lost to Terry Jenkins 0–4)
- 2012: Second round (lost to Kevin Painter 3–4)
- 2013: Third round (lost to Wes Newton 1–4)
- 2014: First round (lost to Jarkko Komula 1–3)

== Career finals ==
=== PDC major finals: 1 ===
Legend
UK Open (0–1)

Outcome	No.	Year	Championship	Opponent in the final	Score (Note: (l) = score in legs, (s) = score in sets.)
Runner-up	1.	2005	UK Open	Phil Taylor	7–13 (l)

== Performance timeline ==
Tournament	2002	2003	2004	2005	2006	2007	2008	2009	2010	2011		2012	2013	2014	2015	2016	2017	2018
PDC World Championship	DNP		2R	3R	2R	1R	2R	2R	1R	3R		2R	3R	1R	DNQ			
UK Open	NH	4R	4R	F	4R	2R	4R	5R	4R	4R		2R	2R	3R	DNQ			1R
World Matchplay	1R	1R	1R	2R	2R	1R	2R	2R	2R	2R		2R	DNQ					
World Grand Prix	DNP	2R	2R	1R	1R	DNQ	2R	1R	2R	1R		1R	DNQ					
European Championship	Not held						QF	QF	QF	2R		1R	DNQ					
Grand Slam of Darts	Not held					DNQ				SF		RR	RR	DNQ				
Players Championship Finals	Not held							1R	2R	1R	QF	1R	DNQ			1R	DNQ	
Las Vegas Desert Classic	DNP			2R	DNQ		2R	1R	Not held									
Championship League	Not held						SF	RR	RR	RR		RR	RR	Not held				
World Darts Trophy	Did not participate					RR	Not held											

Performance Table Legend
W	Won the tournament	F	Finalist	SF	Semifinalist	QF	Quarterfinalist	#R; RR; L#	Lost in # round Round-robin; Last # stage	DQ	Disqualified
DNQ	Did not qualify	DNP	Did not participate	WD	Withdrew	NH	Tournament not held	#R; RR; L#	Lost in # round Round-robin; Last # stage	NYF	Not yet founded
