= 2012 Premier League Darts =

Darts competition

2012 McCoy's Premier League Darts

Tournament information
- Dates: 9 February–17 May 2012
- Nine-dart finish: Phil Taylor; Simon Whitlock

Champion(s)
- Phil Taylor

The 2012 McCoy's Premier League Darts was a darts tournament organised by the Professional Darts Corporation; the eighth edition of the tournament. The event began at the Manchester Arena in Manchester on 9 February, and ended at The O_{2} Arena in London on 17 May.

The format was a double round robin tournament with the top 4 finishers moving on to the play-offs. Each league match was played best of 14 legs. If a player won his eighth leg before the 14th leg, no further legs were played after this point. Two points were awarded for a win and one point awarded for a draw.

Phil Taylor won his sixth and final Premier League title by defeating Simon Whitlock 10–7 in the final. The two men who contested the final were also the players to throw nine-dart finishes during the tournament. Taylor's came in week 2 against Kevin Painter and Whitlock threw his during his semi-final win against Andy Hamilton.

The 2012 Premier League final between Phil Taylor and Simon Whitlock, which took place on 17 May 2012, was the last darts match that Sid Waddell commentated on before his death of bowel cancer on 11 August 2012.

== Qualification ==
The PDC's top four players following the Ladbrokes.com World Darts Championship on 3 January qualified by right to compete in the Premier League Darts 2012, and were joined by four wild card selections. Two being chosen by the PDC and two being chosen by broadcasters Sky Sports. The line-up was confirmed on 3 January 2012. Andy Hamilton and Kevin Painter made their debut Premier League appearances as wildcard entries.

Player	Appearance in Premier League	Consecutive Streak	Previous best performance	Order of Merit Ranking
(England) Phil Taylor	8th	8	Winner (2005–08, 2010)	1
(England) Adrian Lewis	5th	3	Runner-up (2011)	2
(England) James Wade	5th	5	Winner (2009)	3
(Scotland) Gary Anderson	2nd	2	Winner (2011)	4
(Australia) Simon Whitlock WC	3rd	3	Semi-finals (2010)	5
(Netherlands) Raymond van Barneveld WC	7th	7	Semi-finals (2006, 2007, 2008, 2009, 2011)	9
(England) Andy Hamilton WC	1st	1	Debut	7
(England) Kevin Painter WC	1st	1	Debut	10

WC = Wild Card

== Venues ==
Fifteen venues were used for the 2012 Premier League, with the only change being Dublin becoming the first venue from outside the United Kingdom to host a night of the Premier League.

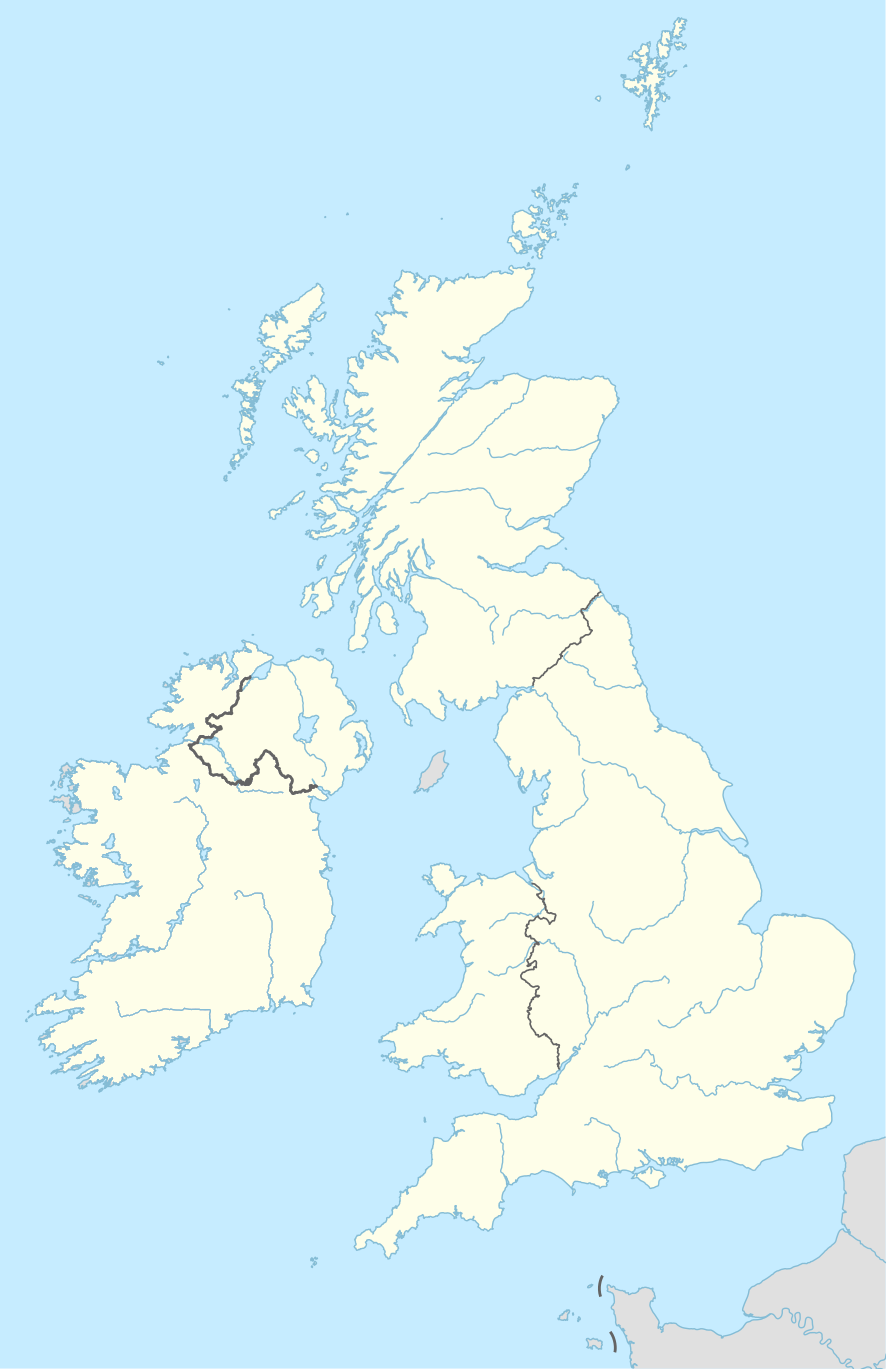
Locations of the 2012 Premier League venues in the United Kingdom.

(England) Manchester	(Scotland) Aberdeen	(Northern Ireland) Belfast	(England) Exeter	(England) Brighton
Manchester Arena; 9 February	AECC; 16 February	Odyssey Arena; 23 February	Westpoint Arena; 1 March	Brighton Centre; 8 March
(Scotland) Glasgow	(Republic of Ireland) Dublin	(Wales) Cardiff	(England) Nottingham	(England) Sheffield
SECC; 15 March	The O_{2} 22 March	Motorpoint Arena; 29 March	Capital FM Arena; 5 April	Motorpoint Arena; 12 April
(England) Bournemouth	(England) Liverpool	(England) Birmingham	(England) Newcastle upon Tyne	(England) London
Bournemouth International Centre; 19 April	Echo Arena; 26 April	National Indoor Arena; 3 May	Metro Radio Arena; 10 May	The O_{2} Arena; 17 May

== Prize money ==
The prize money was increased to £450,000 from £410,000 in 2011, but the highest checkout bonus was withdrawn, and the third place play-off was removed as well.

Stage	Prize money
Winner	£150,000
Runner-up	£70,000
Semi-finalists (x2)	£50,000
5th place	£40,000
6th place	£35,000
7th place	£30,000
8th place	£25,000
Total	£450,000

== Results ==
=== League stage ===
The fixtures were announced on 16 January 2012.

==== 9 February – week 1 ====
(England) MEN Arena, Manchester

Player	Legs	Player
Andy Hamilton (England); 98.90	8 – 5	(England) James Wade; 91.20
Simon Whitlock (Australia); 95.80	7 – 7	(Netherlands) Raymond van Barneveld; 102.58
Kevin Painter (England); 82.67	8 – 6	(Scotland) Gary Anderson; 80.84
Adrian Lewis (England); 104.05	7 – 7	(England) Phil Taylor; 112.79
High Checkout: Adrian Lewis 138

==== 16 February – week 2 ====
(Scotland) AECC, Aberdeen

Player	Legs	Player
Adrian Lewis (England); 99.32	7 – 7	(Netherlands) Raymond van Barneveld; 94.70
Gary Anderson (Scotland); 84.98	8 – 2	(England) Andy Hamilton; 84.28
Phil Taylor (England); 108.27	8 – 5	(England) Kevin Painter; 97.00
Simon Whitlock (Australia); 96.27	8 – 4	(England) James Wade; 96.08
High Checkout: Phil Taylor 147

==== 23 February – week 3 ====
(Northern Ireland) Odyssey Arena, Belfast

Player	Legs	Player
Kevin Painter (England); 92.03	8 – 3	(Australia) Simon Whitlock; 91.63
Andy Hamilton (England); 94.53	7 – 7	(England) Adrian Lewis; 92.29
Gary Anderson (Scotland); 102.20	8 – 5	(England) James Wade; 95.29
Raymond van Barneveld (Netherlands); 105.93	4 – 8	(England) Phil Taylor; 112.91
High Checkout: Raymond van Barneveld 145

==== 1 March – Week 4 ====
(England) Westpoint Arena, Exeter

Player	Legs	Player
Kevin Painter (England); 91.11	6 – 8	(England) James Wade; 89.47
Raymond van Barneveld (Netherlands); 98.30	8 – 6	(England) Andy Hamilton; 91.25
Simon Whitlock (Australia); 105.44	4 – 8	(England) Phil Taylor; 117.35
Gary Anderson (Scotland); 93.47	8 – 1	(England) Adrian Lewis; 86.23
High Checkout: Kevin Painter & James Wade 118

==== 8 March – Week 5 ====
(England) Brighton Centre, Brighton

Player	Legs	Player
Kevin Painter (England); 93.00	8 – 5	(England) Andy Hamilton; 93.64
Phil Taylor (England); 99.89	8 – 1	(Scotland) Gary Anderson; 95.02
James Wade (England); 96.71	8 – 6	(Netherlands) Raymond van Barneveld; 97.87
Simon Whitlock (Australia); 96.05	8 – 4	(England) Adrian Lewis; 92.35
High Checkout: James Wade 154

==== 15 March – Week 6 ====
(Scotland) SECC, Glasgow

Player	Legs	Player
James Wade (England); 96.70	8 – 5	(England) Adrian Lewis; 98.59
Gary Anderson (Scotland); 90.83	6 – 8	(Australia) Simon Whitlock; 97.49
Phil Taylor (England); 106.05	8 – 3	(England) Andy Hamilton; 96.39
Raymond van Barneveld (Netherlands); 95.37	8 – 5	(England) Kevin Painter; 92.45
High Checkout: Simon Whitlock 164

==== 22 March – Week 7 ====
(Republic of Ireland) The O_{2}, Dublin

Player	Legs	Player
Andy Hamilton (England); 97.10	7 – 7	(Australia) Simon Whitlock; 96.74
Adrian Lewis (England); 94.11	8 – 3	(England) Kevin Painter; 88.25
Raymond van Barneveld (Netherlands); 107.22	8 – 5	(Scotland) Gary Anderson; 105.40
Phil Taylor (England); 107.25	8 – 2	(England) James Wade; 102.07
High Checkout: Simon Whitlock 152

==== 29 March – Week 8 ====
(Wales) Cardiff International Arena, Cardiff (Note: Gary Anderson did not compete because he was attending the funeral of his father. Adrian Lewis played twice this week.)

Player	Legs	Player
Adrian Lewis (England); 98.03	4 – 8	(England) Andy Hamilton; 95.33
James Wade (England); 96.97	8 – 0	(Australia) Simon Whitlock; 80.79
Kevin Painter (England); 92.33	2 – 8	(England) Phil Taylor; 113.30
Raymond van Barneveld (Netherlands); 92.98	2 – 8	(England) Adrian Lewis; 99.98
High Checkout: Adrian Lewis 160

==== 5 April – Week 9 ====
(England) Capital FM Arena, Nottingham

Player	Legs	Player
Kevin Painter (England); 100.08	6 – 8	(Netherlands) Raymond van Barneveld; 112.28
Adrian Lewis (England); 104.70	8 – 5	(England) James Wade; 89.04
Andy Hamilton (England); 97.43	6 – 8	(England) Phil Taylor; 103.68
Simon Whitlock (Australia); 101.09	8 – 2	(Scotland) Gary Anderson; 94.42
High Checkout: Gary Anderson 143

==== 12 April – week 10 ====
(England) Motorpoint Arena, Sheffield (Note: Gary Anderson competed twice this week because of his absence in week 8. Adrian Lewis did not play this week.)

Player	Legs	Player
James Wade (England); 101.02	8 – 3	(Scotland) Gary Anderson; 95.40
Simon Whitlock (Australia); 103.43	8 – 5	(England) Kevin Painter; 94.22
Phil Taylor (England); 105.02	8 – 3	(Netherlands) Raymond van Barneveld; 100.53
Gary Anderson (Scotland); 95.94	7 – 7	(England) Andy Hamilton; 92.36
High Checkout: Phil Taylor & Andy Hamilton 124

==== 19 April – week 11 ====
(England) Bournemouth International Centre, Bournemouth

Player	Legs	Player
Raymond van Barneveld (Netherlands); 88.77	4 – 8	(Australia) Simon Whitlock; 89.75
Gary Anderson (Scotland); 85.01	4 – 8	(England) Kevin Painter; 90.65
James Wade (England); 99.30	7 – 7	(England) Andy Hamilton; 100.41
Phil Taylor (England); 98.85	5 – 8	(England) Adrian Lewis; 101.90
High Checkout: Adrian Lewis 160

==== 26 April – week 12 ====
(England) Echo Arena, Liverpool

Player	Legs	Player
James Wade (England); 97.07	7 – 7	(England) Kevin Painter; 99.14
Phil Taylor (England); 104.41	8 – 3	(Australia) Simon Whitlock; 100.23
Andy Hamilton (England); 95.71	7 – 7	(Netherlands) Raymond van Barneveld; 95.71
Adrian Lewis (England); 98.15	7 – 7	(Scotland) Gary Anderson; 99.26
High Checkout: Adrian Lewis 170

==== 3 May – week 13 ====
(England) National Indoor Arena, Birmingham

Player	Legs	Player
Simon Whitlock (Australia); 97.46	4 – 8	(England) Andy Hamilton; 95.43
Gary Anderson (Scotland); 98.40	7 – 7	(Netherlands) Raymond van Barneveld; 96.35
Kevin Painter (England); 96.04	8 – 3	(England) Adrian Lewis; 96.47
James Wade (England); 93.55	1 – 8	(England) Phil Taylor; 116.10
High Checkout: Raymond van Barneveld 170

==== 10 May – week 14 ====
(England) Metro Radio Arena, Newcastle upon Tyne

Player	Legs	Player
Andy Hamilton (England); 90.86	8 – 1	(England) Kevin Painter; 89.51
Gary Anderson (Scotland); 96.08	7 – 7	(England) Phil Taylor; 105.41
Raymond van Barneveld (Netherlands); 94.86	7 – 7	(England) James Wade; 96.99
Adrian Lewis (England); 94.70	6 – 8	(Australia) Simon Whitlock; 96.19
High Checkout: Raymond van Barneveld & Gary Anderson 161

=== Play-offs – 17 May ===
(England) The O_{2} Arena, London

	Score	
Semi-finals (best of 15 legs)
Phil Taylor (England); 99.32	8 – 6	(England) James Wade; 97.23
Simon Whitlock (Australia); 96.59	8 – 6	(England) Andy Hamilton; 95.62
Final (best of 19 legs)
Phil Taylor (England); 97.08	10 – 7	(Australia) Simon Whitlock; 95.32
High Checkout: Phil Taylor 149 (Semi-final)

== Table and streaks ==
=== Table ===
Pos	Name	Pld	W	D	L	Pts	LF	LA	+/-	LWAT	100+	140+	180s	A	HC
1	(England) Phil Taylor W	14	11	2	1	24	107	56	+51	39	193	145	52	107.95	147
2	(Australia) Simon Whitlock RU	14	7	2	5	16	84	85	–1	28	201	132	48	96.31	164
3	(England) Andy Hamilton	14	4	5	5	13	89	89	0	27	194	100	43	94.54	152
4	(England) James Wade	14	5	3	6	13	83	89	–6	26	220	132	41	95.82	154
5	(Netherlands) Raymond van Barneveld	14	4	5	5	13	86	97	−11	29	246	140	48	98.82	170
6	(England) Adrian Lewis	14	4	4	6	12	83	91	–8	26	207	104	58	97.21	170
7	(England) Kevin Painter	14	5	1	8	11	80	92	–12	29	216	119	34	92.75	157
8	(Scotland) Gary Anderson	14	3	4	7	10	79	92	–13	34	224	136	31	94.09	161

Last updated: 11 May 2012
Source: Match reports from the results section

Top four qualified for the Play-offs after Week 14.
NB: LWAT = Legs Won Against Throw. A = Average HC = High checkout. Players separated by +/- leg difference if tied. If leg difference is equal the table is sorted by the player's LWAT.

=== Streaks ===
Player	League Stage																Play-offs	
Player	1	2	3	4	5	6	7	8		9	10		11	12	13	14	SF	F
(England) Phil Taylor	D	W	W	W	W	W	W	W		W	W		L	W	W	D	W	W
(Australia) Simon Whitlock	D	W	L	L	W	W	D	L		W	W		W	L	L	W	W	L
(England) Andy Hamilton	W	L	D	L	L	L	D	W		L	D		D	D	W	W	L	DNP
(England) James Wade	L	L	L	W	W	W	L	W		L	W		D	D	L	D	L	DNP
(Netherlands) Raymond van Barneveld	D	D	L	W	L	W	W	L		W	L		L	D	D	D	DNP	
(England) Adrian Lewis	D	D	D	L	L	L	W	L	W	W	DNP		W	D	L	L	DNP	
(England) Kevin Painter	W	L	W	L	W	L	L	L		L	L		W	D	W	L	DNP	
(Scotland) Gary Anderson	L	W	W	W	L	L	L	DNP		L	L	D	L	D	D	D	DNP	

Legend:	W	Win	D	Draw	L	Loss	DNP	Did not play

== Player statistics ==
The following statistics are for the league stage only. Playoffs are not included.

=== Phil Taylor ===
- Longest unbeaten run: 10
- Most consecutive wins: 9
- Most consecutive draws: 1
- Most consecutive losses: 1
- Longest without a win: 1
- Biggest victory: 8–1 (v. Gary Anderson and v. James Wade)
- Biggest defeat: 5–8 (v. Adrian Lewis)

=== Simon Whitlock ===
- Longest unbeaten run: 3
- Most consecutive wins: 3
- Most consecutive draws: 1
- Most consecutive losses: 2
- Longest without a win: 2
- Biggest victory: 8–2 (v. Gary Anderson)
- Biggest defeat: 0–8 (v. James Wade)

=== Andy Hamilton ===
- Longest unbeaten run: 5
- Most consecutive wins: 2
- Most consecutive draws: 3
- Most consecutive losses: 3
- Longest without a win: 6
- Biggest victory: 8–1 (v. Kevin Painter)
- Biggest defeat: 2–8 (v. Gary Anderson)

=== James Wade ===
- Longest unbeaten run: 3
- Most consecutive wins: 3
- Most consecutive draws: 2
- Most consecutive losses: 3
- Longest without a win: 4
- Biggest victory: 8–0 (v. Simon Whitlock)
- Biggest defeat: 1–8 (v. Phil Taylor)

=== Raymond van Barneveld ===
- Longest unbeaten run: 3
- Most consecutive wins: 2
- Most consecutive draws: 3
- Most consecutive losses: 2
- Longest without a win: 5
- Biggest victory: 8–5 (v. Gary Anderson and v. Kevin Painter)
- Biggest defeat: 2–8 (v. Adrian Lewis)

=== Adrian Lewis ===
- Longest unbeaten run: 4
- Most consecutive wins: 3
- Most consecutive draws: 3
- Most consecutive losses: 3
- Longest without a win: 6
- Biggest victory: 8–2 (v. Raymond van Barneveld)
- Biggest defeat: 1–8 (v. Gary Anderson)

=== Kevin Painter ===
- Longest unbeaten run: 3
- Most consecutive wins: 1
- Most consecutive draws: 1
- Most consecutive losses: 5
- Longest without a win: 5
- Biggest victory: 8–3 (v. Simon Whitlock and v. Adrian Lewis)
- Biggest defeat: 1–8 (v. Andy Hamilton)

=== Gary Anderson ===
- Longest unbeaten run: 3
- Most consecutive wins: 3
- Most consecutive draws: 3
- Most consecutive losses: 5
- Longest without a win: 10
- Biggest victory: 8–1 (v. Adrian Lewis)
- Biggest defeat: 1–8 (v. Phil Taylor)

== Charity single ==
The 2012 Premier League Darts players teamed up with the singer Chas Hodges and his band to record a charity single written by Chas called "Got My Tickets for the Darts". The video features Chas, his band, the 2012 Premier League Darts players and walk-on girl Jacqui Adams. The song was released exclusively on iTunes on Friday 18 May, the night after the play-offs at the O2 in London, where it was premiered. Proceeds from the single was donated to the Haven House Children's Hospice.
