= 2012 Players Championship Finals =

2012 Cash Converters Players Championship Finals

Tournament information
- Dates: 30 November–2 December 2012
- Venue: Butlin's Minehead
- Location: Minehead, England
- Organisation(s): Professional Darts Corporation (PDC)
- Format: Legs
- Prize fund: £250,000
- Winner's share: £60,000
- High checkout: 170; Phil Taylor; Simon Whitlock

Champion(s)
- (England) Phil Taylor

The 2012 Cash Converters Players Championship Finals was the fifth edition of the PDC darts tournament, the Players Championship Finals, which saw the top 32 players from the 2012 PDC Players Championship Order of Merit taking part. The tournament took place from 30 November to 2 December 2012 at the Butlin's Resort Minehead in Minehead, England. This was the second Players Championship Final to be held before the PDC World Championship.

Kevin Painter was the defending champion, but he lost to Michael van Gerwen in the first round.

Phil Taylor won his third and final Players Championship Finals title with a 13–6 victory over Kim Huybrechts in the final.

== Prize money ==
Position (no. of players)		Prize money (Total: £250,000)
Winner	(1)	£60,000
Runner-Up	(1)	£24,000
Semi-finalists	(2)	£15,000
Quarter-finalists	(4)	£10,000
Last 16 (second round)	(8)	£6,000
Last 32 (first round)	(16)	£3,000

== Qualification ==
This was the final PDC ProTour Order of Merit.

1. (England) Dave Chisnall (first round)
2. (Australia) Simon Whitlock (semi-finals)
3. (Netherlands) Michael van Gerwen (second round)
4. (Netherlands) Raymond van Barneveld (first round)
5. (England) Justin Pipe (semi-finals)
6. (England) Phil Taylor (champion)
7. (England) Wes Newton (first round)
8. (England) Ian White (first round)
9. (Belgium) Kim Huybrechts (runner-up)
10. (Scotland) Robert Thornton (second round)
11. (England) Adrian Lewis (second round)
12. (England) James Wade (first round)
13. (England) Terry Jenkins (first round)
14. (England) Andy Hamilton (quarter-finals)
15. (England) Ronnie Baxter (second round)
16. (England) Colin Lloyd (first round)
17. (Scotland) Peter Wright (quarter-finals)
18. (Australia) Paul Nicholson (first round)
19. (England) Andy Smith (first round)
20. (England) Mervyn King (quarter-finals)
21. (Northern Ireland) Brendan Dolan (second round)
22. (Wales) Richie Burnett (first round)
23. (England) Mark Walsh (first round)
24. (Netherlands) Vincent van der Voort (first round)
25. (England) Michael Smith (second round)
26. (Scotland) Gary Anderson (quarter-finals)
27. (Wales) Mark Webster (first round)
28. (England) Colin Osborne (first round)
29. (England) Steve Beaton (second round)
30. (England) Kevin Painter (first round)
31. (England) Jamie Caven (first round)
32. (England) Wayne Jones (second round)

== Draw ==
First round (best of 11 legs); 30 November
1	(England) Dave Chisnall 84.91	0
32	(England) Wayne Jones 92.02	6
16	(England) Colin Lloyd 84.97	5
17	(Scotland) Peter Wright 87.66	6
8	(England) Ian White 89.45	5
25	(England) Michael Smith 91.73	6
9	(Belgium) Kim Huybrechts 88.83	6
24	(Netherlands) Vincent van der Voort 89.80	3
4	(Netherlands) Raymond van Barneveld 99.79	5
29	(England) Steve Beaton 94.79	6
13	(England) Terry Jenkins 88.56	5
20	(England) Mervyn King 88.72	6
5	(England) Justin Pipe 93.68	6
28	(England) Colin Osborne 88.58	3
12	(England) James Wade 89.98	4
21	(Northern Ireland) Brendan Dolan 93.52	6
2	(Australia) Simon Whitlock 91.95	6
31	(England) Jamie Caven 88.68	3
15	(England) Ronnie Baxter 88.94	6
18	(Australia) Paul Nicholson 86.77	5
7	(England) Wes Newton 92.83	4
26	(Scotland) Gary Anderson 96.86	6
10	(Scotland) Robert Thornton 99.50	6
23	(England) Mark Walsh 89.17	1
3	(Netherlands) Michael van Gerwen 91.78	6
30	(England) Kevin Painter 83.62	3
14	(England) Andy Hamilton 88.05	6
19	(England) Andy Smith 82.30	2
6	(England) Phil Taylor 101.02	6
27	(Wales) Mark Webster 94.19	2
11	(England) Adrian Lewis 88.78	6
22	(Wales) Richie Burnett 83.90	3

Second round (best of 19 legs); 1 December
32	(England) Wayne Jones 93.72	7
17	(Scotland) Peter Wright 94.70	10
25	(England) Michael Smith 98.39	6
9	(Belgium) Kim Huybrechts 98.73	10
29	(England) Steve Beaton 92.15	7
20	(England) Mervyn King 89.02	10
5	(England) Justin Pipe 89.57	10
21	(Northern Ireland) Brendan Dolan 93.27	8
2	(Australia) Simon Whitlock 109.54	10
15	(England) Ronnie Baxter 95.10	1
26	(Scotland) Gary Anderson 97.97	10
10	(Scotland) Robert Thornton 93.08	6
3	(Netherlands) Michael van Gerwen 95.85	8
14	(England) Andy Hamilton 94.90	10
6	(England) Phil Taylor 105.67	10
11	(England) Adrian Lewis 97.83	7

Quarter-finals (best of 19 legs); 2 December
17	(Scotland) Peter Wright 99.71	6
9	(Belgium) Kim Huybrechts 104.34	10
20	(England) Mervyn King 93.31	7
5	(England) Justin Pipe 94.59	10
2	(Australia) Simon Whitlock 99.99	10
26	(Scotland) Gary Anderson 103.50	8
14	(England) Andy Hamilton 102.16	9
6	(England) Phil Taylor 103.29	10

Semi-finals (best of 21 legs); 2 December
9	(Belgium) Kim Huybrechts 96.05	11
5	(England) Justin Pipe 95.80	6
2	(Australia) Simon Whitlock 95.55	2
6	(England) Phil Taylor 106.02	11

Final (best of 25 legs); 2 December
9	(Belgium) Kim Huybrechts 91.70	6
6	(England) Phil Taylor 103.57	13

== Statistics ==
Player	Eliminated	Played	Legs Won	Legs Lost	LWAT	100+	140+	180s	High checkout	3-dart average
(England) Phil Taylor	Winner	5	50	26	19	112	65	20	170	103.91
(Belgium) Kim Huybrechts	Final	5	43	34	12	96	55	19	137	95.93
(Australia) Simon Whitlock	Semi-finals	4	28	23	9	60	44	12	170	99.26
(England) Justin Pipe	Semi-finals	4	32	29	13	86	48	15	127	93.41
(Scotland) Gary Anderson	Quarter-finals	3	24	20	8	61	34	11	140	99.98
(England) Andy Hamilton	Quarter-finals	3	25	20	12	43	30	14	142	95.04
(Scotland) Peter Wright	Quarter-finals	3	22	22	7	64	31	6	102	94.76
(England) Mervyn King	Quarter-finals	3	23	22	10	61	32	6	111	90.57
(Scotland) Robert Thornton	Second round	2	12	11	4	34	17	3	120	96.29
(England) Michael Smith	Second round	2	12	15	4	34	21	7	96	95.68
(Netherlands) Michael van Gerwen	Second round	2	14	13	7	34	21	6	130	93.82
(England) Steve Beaton	Second round	2	13	15	6	40	17	8	161	93.47
(Northern Ireland) Brendan Dolan	Second round	2	14	14	3	37	18	2	164	93.36
(England) Adrian Lewis	Second round	2	13	13	5	32	20	5	150	93.31
(England) Wayne Jones	Second round	2	13	10	3	32	26	2	121	93.28
(England) Ronnie Baxter	Second round	2	7	15	3	30	12	4	134	92.02
(Netherlands) Raymond van Barneveld	First round	1	5	6	3	14	11	2	54	99.79
(Wales) Mark Webster	First round	1	2	6	1	7	6	1	40	94.19
(England) Wes Newton	First round	1	4	6	1	12	8	1	106	92.83
(England) James Wade	First round	1	4	6	2	18	6	0	129	89.98
(Netherlands) Vincent van der Voort	First round	1	3	6	1	11	4	2	46	89.80
(England) Ian White	First round	1	5	6	3	16	5	3	97	89.45
(England) Mark Walsh	First round	1	1	6	0	11	3	1	36	89.17
(England) Jamie Caven	First round	1	3	6	0	11	6	1	85	88.68
(England) Colin Osborne	First round	1	3	6	0	10	4	1	82	88.58
(England) Terry Jenkins	First round	1	5	6	2	11	7	4	87	88.56
(Australia) Paul Nicholson	First round	1	5	6	2	11	8	1	82	86.77
(England) Colin Lloyd	First round	1	5	6	2	8	6	2	80	84.97
(Wales) Richie Burnett	First round	1	3	6	0	8	6	2	56	83.90
(England) Kevin Painter	First round	1	3	6	2	8	4	1	135	83.62
(England) Dave Chisnall	First round	1	0	6	0	8	1	2	–	82.91
(England) Andy Smith	First round	1	2	6	1	13	5	0	100	82.30

Source: Match reports in the draw

== Television coverage ==
The tournament was broadcast in the UK by ITV4 and by Fox Sports in Australia.
