= Andy Hamilton (darts player) =

English darts player (born 1967)

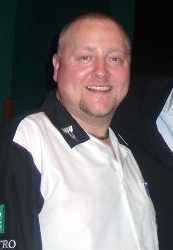

Personal information
- Full name: Andrew Hamilton
- Nickname: "The Hammer"
- Born: 16 March 1967 (age 59) Stoke-on-Trent, England

Sport
- Sport: Darts
- Playing since: 1981
- Darts: 25g XQ-Max signature
- Laterality: Right-handed
- Walk-on music: "U Can't Touch This" by MC Hammer

Organisation (see split in darts)
- BDO: 2018–2020
- PDC: 2004–2018, 2020– (Tour Card: 2011–2017, 2020–2021)

WDF major events – best performances
- World Championship: Last 16: 2020
- World Masters: Last 64: 2019
- World Trophy: Semi-final: 2007
- Int. Darts League: First Round Group Stage: 2007
- Finder Masters: Last 24 Group: 2018

PDC premier events – best performances
- World Championship: Runner-up: 2012
- World Matchplay: Semi-final: 2006, 2011
- World Grand Prix: Semi-final: 2009
- UK Open: Runner-up: 2013
- Grand Slam: Runner-up: 2007
- European Championship: Quarter-final: 2012, 2013
- Premier League: Semi-final: 2012
- Desert Classic: Quarter-final: 2006, 2008
- US Open/WSoD: Semi-final: 2007
- PC Finals: Semi-final: 2013
- Masters: Last 16: 2013, 2014, 2015

WSDT major events – best performances
- World Championship: Quarter-final: 2024
- Champions: Runner-up: 2024

Other tournament wins
- Years
Antwerp Open	2008
Coronation Hotel 500	2010
Cotgrave Open	2010
Coventry Open	2008
LPKD Spring Open	2009
PDC Challenge Tour	2022
Tamworth Open	2010
Modus Super Series 9 Week 3 Winner	2024
Modus Super Series 11 Week 5 Winner	2025
Players Championships
Players Championship (Gibraltar)	2007
UK Open Qualifiers (x2)
2007, 2014

Andrew Hamilton (born 16 March 1967), nicknamed the Hammer, is an English professional darts player who formerly competed in Professional Darts Corporation (PDC) events, finishing as runner-up in three majors: the 2012 PDC World Championship, 2007 Grand Slam and 2013 UK Open.

== Career ==
=== Early career ===
Hamilton began playing darts as a teenager alongside his father Jim and brother Darren. By the age of 18, he was representing Cheshire at county level, but subsequently spent around two decades away from competitive darts before returning to the sport in 2004.

=== 2004–2007: PDC debut and first major final ===
Hamilton made his televised PDC debut at the 2004 UK Open, losing 5–2 to Eddie Lovely. Later that year, he reached the semi-finals of a PDC Pro Tour Players Championship in Scotland. He qualified for his first PDC World Darts Championship in 2005, defeating Steve Beaton and Josephus Schenk on his way to the quarter-finals, where he lost 5–1 to Bob Anderson. At the 2006 World Championship, he reached the third round before losing to Phil Taylor. Later in 2006, he reached his first televised PDC major semi-final at the World Matchplay, losing 17–11 to Taylor.

At the 2007 PDC World Darts Championship, Hamilton defeated Mark Dudbridge, Dennis Priestley and Terry Jenkins to reach the semi-finals, where he was beaten 6–0 by Taylor. In January 2007, he claimed his first PDC Pro Tour title at a Players Championship in Gibraltar, defeating Colin Lloyd 3–1 in the final. He also won a UK Open qualifying event that year and reached the semi-finals of both the US Open and the World Darts Trophy.

In November, Hamilton reached his first major final at the inaugural Grand Slam of Darts. He lost 18–11 to Taylor in an all-Stoke-on-Trent final.

=== 2008–2011: Established major contender ===
Hamilton continued to reach the latter stages of major tournaments, making the quarter-finals of the 2008 Las Vegas Desert Classic and the 2008 World Grand Prix. He progressed to the semi-finals of the 2009 World Grand Prix and reached another quarter-final at the event in 2010. At the 2011 World Matchplay, he defeated Gary Anderson and John Henderson before recovering from 15–8 down against Simon Whitlock in the quarter-finals. Hamilton won nine consecutive legs to win 17–15, but lost 17–9 to Taylor in the semi-finals.

=== 2012–2013: World Championship and UK Open finals ===
Hamilton's best World Championship performance came at the 2012 PDC World Darts Championship. He defeated Antonio Alcinas, Vincent van der Voort, Dave Chisnall and Kim Huybrechts before recovering from a 5–3 deficit to beat Whitlock 6–5 in the semi-finals. In his first World Championship final, Hamilton lost 7–3 to defending champion Adrian Lewis and received £100,000 in runner-up prize money.

His World Championship performance earned him a place in the 2012 Premier League, in which he finished third in the league stage before losing 8–6 to Whitlock in the play-off semi-finals. He also reached the quarter-finals of the 2012 World Matchplay and the semi-finals of the 2012 Grand Slam of Darts, losing to Taylor and Raymond van Barneveld respectively.

Hamilton made his third major final at the 2013 UK Open. After defeating James Wade 10–8 in the quarter-finals and Van Barneveld 10–9 in the semi-finals, he lost 11–4 to Taylor in the final. He also reached the semi-finals of the 2013 Players Championship Finals, where he lost 10–5 to Michael van Gerwen. He was fifth on the PDC Order of Merit in December 2013.

=== 2014–2017: Decline and loss of Tour Card ===
Hamilton won the first UK Open qualifier of 2014, beating Lewis 6–2 in the final for his first PDC ranking title since 2007. He also reached the semi-finals of the 2014 European Darts Trophy, losing to Michael Smith, but was unable to maintain his previous level of success in major tournaments. At the 2015 PDC World Darts Championship, he was eliminated 4–0 by Peter Wright in the third round.

At the 2016 PDC World Darts Championship, Hamilton lost 3–2 to Joe Murnan in the opening round. It was his twelfth consecutive appearance at the PDC World Championship, but proved to be his last until the 2021 edition. He subsequently fell outside the world's top 32 and lost his PDC Tour Card at the end of 2017.

=== 2018–2021: BDO spell and return to the PDC ===
After losing his Tour Card, Hamilton began competing in BDO and WDF events in 2018. He reached the final of that year's Welsh Open, losing 6–3 to Mike Warburton. He qualified for the 2019 BDO World Darts Championship, where he lost 3–0 to David Cameron in the preliminary round. At the 2020 BDO World Darts Championship, he defeated Darren Herewini 3–1 before losing 4–1 in the second round to eventual champion Wayne Warren.

In January 2020, Hamilton regained a two-year PDC Tour Card through the UK Qualifying School Order of Merit. He qualified for two PDC European Tour events and the 2020 European Championship, losing 6–1 to Devon Petersen in the latter. Hamilton also qualified for the 2021 PDC World Darts Championship, his first appearance at the event in five years, but lost 3–1 to Nico Kurz in the first round. He lost his Tour Card again at the end of 2021.

=== 2022–present: Challenge Tour, seniors and MODUS Super Series ===
Hamilton returned to the PDC Challenge Tour in 2022. On 16 October, he won the final event of the season in Leicester, defeating Scott Taylor 5–4 in the final. It was his first PDC title in more than eight years. He continued to play on the Challenge Tour in subsequent seasons.

In February 2024, Hamilton made his World Seniors Darts Championship debut and reached the quarter-finals after defeating two-time defending champion Robert Thornton 3–2. He was eliminated 3–1 by eventual champion John Henderson. The following month, he reached the final of the World Seniors Champion of Champions, defeating Henderson and Richard-Eirig Rowlands before losing 13–10 to Richie Howson.

Hamilton also began competing regularly in the MODUS Super Series. In September 2024, he won a weekly final with a 4–2 victory over Jack Tweddell, and he claimed another weekly title in June 2025 by defeating Carl Sneyd 4–3.

== Personal life ==
An electrician by trade, Hamilton bought the Skylark pub in Talke in 2005, which allowed him more time to practise darts while maintaining an income.

In 2012, Hamilton and the other seven Premier League competitors recorded the charity single "Got My Ticket for the Darts" with Chas Hodges. Proceeds were donated to Haven House Children's Hospice.

== World Championship results ==
=== PDC ===
- 2005: Quarter-finals (lost to Bob Anderson 1–5)
- 2006: Third round (lost to Phil Taylor 0–4)
- 2007: Semi-finals (lost to Phil Taylor 0–6)
- 2008: Second round (lost to Alex Roy 1–4)
- 2009: Third round (lost to Jelle Klaasen 1–4)
- 2010: Third round (lost to James Wade 3–4)
- 2011: Second round (lost to Robert Thornton 0–4)
- 2012: Runner-up (lost to Adrian Lewis 3–7)
- 2013: Quarter-finals (lost to Phil Taylor 0–5)
- 2014: Second round (lost to Richie Burnett 1–4)
- 2015: Third round (lost to Peter Wright 0–4)
- 2016: First round (lost to Joe Murnan 2–3)
- 2021: First round (lost to Nico Kurz 1–3)

=== BDO ===
- 2019: Preliminary round (lost to David Cameron 0–3)
- 2020: Second round (lost to Wayne Warren 1–4)

=== WSDT ===
- 2024: Quarter-finals (lost to John Henderson 1–3)

== Career finals ==
=== PDC major finals: 3 (3 runners-up) ===
Legend
World Championship (0–1)
Grand Slam (0–1)
UK Open (0-1)

Outcome	No.	Year	Championship	Opponent in the final	Score	Ref.
Runner-up	1.	2007	Grand Slam of Darts	Phil Taylor	11–18 (l)	
Runner-up	2.	2012	World Darts Championship	Adrian Lewis	3–7 (s)	
Runner-up	3.	2013	UK Open	Phil Taylor	4–11 (l)	

=== Seniors major finals: 1 (1 runner-up) ===
Outcome	No.	Year	Championship	Opponent in the final	Score	Ref.
Runner-up	1.	2024	World Seniors Champion of Champions	(England) Richie Howson	10–13 (l)	

== Performance timeline ==
=== BDO ===
Tournament	2007	2018	2019	2020
BDO Ranked televised events
BDO World Championship	DNP	DNP	Prel.	2R
World Masters	DNP	2R	3R	NH
Finder Darts Masters	DNP	RR	NH	
International Darts League	RR	Not held		
World Darts Trophy	SF	Not held		
BDO World Trophy	NH	DNP	2R	NH

=== WSDT ===
Tournament	2024
WSDT televised events
World Seniors Darts Championship	QF
World Seniors Champion of Champions	F

=== PDC ===
Tournament	2004	2005	2006	2007	2008	2009	2010	2011		2012	2013	2014	2015	2016	2017	2018	2019	2020	2021
PDC Ranked televised events
PDC World Championship	DNQ	QF	3R	SF	2R	3R	3R	2R		F	QF	2R	3R	1R	DNQ				1R
UK Open	1R	5R	4R	4R	5R	4R	QF	3R		4R	F	4R	4R	3R	DNQ	2R	DNQ	2R	4R
World Matchplay	DNQ		SF	2R	1R	1R	1R	SF		QF	QF	2R	2R	DNQ					
World Grand Prix	DNQ			1R	QF	SF	QF	1R		QF	QF	1R	DNQ						
European Championship	Not held				1R	2R	1R	1R		QF	QF	1R	DNQ					1R	DNQ
Grand Slam of Darts	Not held			F	2R	RR	DNQ			SF	2R	RR	DNQ						
Players Championship Finals	Not held					2R	2R	1R	DNQ	QF	SF	1R	DNQ	1R	DNQ				
PDC Non-ranked televised events
Premier League Darts	NH	DNP								SF	7th	DNP							
Masters	Not held										1R	1R	1R	DNQ					
PDC Past major events
Las Vegas Desert Classic	DNQ	1R	QF	1R	QF	2R	Not held												
Career statistics
Year-end ranking	-	-	13	7	7	14	12	17		8	5	12	27	42	65	Non-PDC		93	85

==== PDC European Tour ====
Season	1	2	3	4	5	6	7	8	9	10	11	12
2012	ADO; 2R	GDC; 1R	EDO; 1R	GDM; 3R	DDM; 3R							
2013	UKM; SF	EDT; 2R	EDO; QF	ADO; 2R	GDT; 3R	GDC; QF	GDM; 2R	DDM; 3R				
2014	GDC; 2R	DNQ	GDM; 2R	ADO; 2R	GDT; 2R	EDO; QF	EDG; 2R	EDT; SF				
2015	DNQ							EDM; 2R	DNQ			
2016	DNQ		GDT; 1R	DNQ			EDO; 1R	IDO; 1R	DNQ			
2017	DNQ		GDO; 1R	DNQ		EDM; 3R	DNQ				IDO; 1R	DNQ
2020	BDC; 2R	DNQ		IDO; 3R								

==== PDC Players Championships ====
Season	1	2	3	4	5	6	7	8	9	10	11	12	13	14	15	16	17	18	19	20	21	22	23	24	25	26	27	28	29	30	31	32	33	34	35	36	37
2004	DNP				EDI; SF																																
2005	DNP	IOW; 3R	DNP	NEW; 2R	DNP	IRV; 3R	DNP																														
2006	GIB; 3R	HAY; 3R	HAY; 2R	BLA; 2R	NEW; SF	DUB; 3R	IRV; 3R	LIS; 3R	LIS; SF																												
2007	GIB; 3R	GIB; W	BAD; QF	TEM; SF	SCH; 4R	HEE; 4R	HAY; 3R	HAY; 3R	LVE; 2R	BLA; 1R	DNP		CHI; 4R	NEW; 2R	DUB; 1R	IRV; 3R	KIR; 1R	KIL; 3R	LIS; QF	LIS; QF																	
2008	GIB; 4R	GIB; 3R	BRE; SF	WIG; 4R	BAD; SF	BAD; 4R	TEL; 2R	TEM; QF	GLA; 2R	SCH; 4R	BRI; 4R	BRI; 2R	LVE; 3R	BLA; 3R	DNP		ATL; F	VEL; SF	VEL; 4R	DRO; QF	CHI; 4R	NEW; 3R	NEW; 4R	DUB; QF	DUB; 4R	IRV; QF	IRV; SF	DIN; 4R	DNP	LEI; SF	LEI; 3R						
2009	DON; QF	GIB; 4R	GIB; 3R	GLA; 4R	GLA; 4R	IRV; 3R	WIG; 2R	BRE; 1R	COV; 1R	NUL; 3R	NUL; 2R	TAU; 2R	DER; 3R	NEW; 4R	BAR; 3R	BAR; 1R	DIN; 4R	DIN; F	LVE; 4R	DNP		ATL; 4R	SAL; 3R	SAL; 3R	DUB; F	DUB; 4R	KIL; QF	NUL; 2R	NUL; 4R	IRV; 3R	IRV; 3R						
2010	GIB; 4R	GIB; SF	SWI; F	DER; 4R	GLA; 3R	GLA; 1R	WIG; SF	CRA; 4R	BAR; 4R	DER; 3R	WIG; SF	WIG; F	SAL; 4R	SAL; 1R	BAR; QF	BAR; QF	HAA; 2R	HAA; 4R	LVE; 3R	LVE; 4R	LVE; 3R	DNP	ONT; QF	ONT; 4R	CRA; 2R	CRA; 2R	NUL; 3R	NUL; 3R	DUB; QF	DUB; 2R	KIL; 3R	BAD; 4R	BAD; 3R	BAR; 2R	BAR; 4R	DER; 2R	DER; 3R
2011	HAL; 3R	HAL; 4R	DER; 2R	DER; 3R	CRA; 1R	CRA; 3R	VIE; 2R	VIE; QF	CRA; 4R	CRA; 2R	BAR; 2R	BAR; 4R	NUL; 1R	NUL; 2R	ONT; 4R	ONT; 4R	DER; 1R	DER; 3R	NUL; 3R	NUL; 2R	DUB; 3R	DUB; 2R	KIL; QF	GLA; 3R	GLA; 2R	ALI; 3R	ALI; 2R	CRA; 3R	CRA; 1R	WIG; 2R	WIG; 1R						
2012	ALI; 3R	ALI; 3R	REA; 1R	REA; QF	CRA; 4R	CRA; 3R	BIR; 3R	BIR; 3R	CRA; 3R	CRA; F	BAR; SF	BAR; F	DUB; 2R	DUB; 4R	KIL; QF	KIL; 1R	DNP		BAR; 4R	BAR; 4R																	
2013	WIG; 1R	WIG; 3R	DNP		CRA; 1R	CRA; F	BAR; 2R	BAR; 4R	DUB; 1R	DUB; 3R	KIL; 3R	KIL; 3R	DNP		BAR; 2R	BAR; 1R																					
2014	BAR; QF	BAR; 1R	CRA; 3R	CRA; 1R	WIG; 1R	WIG; 2R	WIG; 1R	WIG; 1R	CRA; 3R	CRA; SF	COV; 3R	COV; 1R	CRA; 1R	CRA; 3R	DUB; 4R	DUB; 3R	CRA; 1R	CRA; 2R	COV; 2R	COV; 2R																	
2015	BAR; 3R	BAR; 2R	BAR; 3R	BAR; 4R	BAR; 2R	COV; 2R	COV; 1R	COV; 1R	CRA; 4R	CRA; 1R	BAR; 3R	BAR; 1R	WIG; 3R	WIG; 1R	BAR; 1R	BAR; 1R	DUB; 1R	DUB; QF	COV; 1R	COV; 1R																	
2016	BAR; 2R	BAR; 2R	BAR; 3R	BAR; 3R	BAR; 2R	BAR; 1R	BAR; 1R	COV; 1R	COV; 2R	BAR; 2R	BAR; 2R	BAR; 1R	BAR; 2R	BAR; 1R	BAR; 1R	BAR; 3R	DUB; 1R	DUB; 2R	BAR; 3R	BAR; 1R																	
2017	BAR; 1R	BAR; 1R	BAR; 1R	BAR; 1R	MIL; 2R	MIL; 2R	BAR; 4R	BAR; 2R	WIG; 2R	WIG; 1R	MIL; 1R	MIL; 3R	WIG; 2R	WIG; 1R	BAR; 1R	BAR; 1R	BAR; 1R	BAR; 1R	DUB; 1R	DUB; 1R	BAR; 2R	BAR; 3R															
2019 (Note: Not a Tour card holder)	WIG; 1R	WIG; 1R	Did not participate																																		
2020	BAR; 1R	BAR; 2R	WIG; 1R	WIG; 1R	WIG; 2R	WIG; 2R	BAR; 1R	BAR; 2R	MIL; 3R	MIL; 1R	MIL; 2R	MIL; 2R	MIL; 1R	Did not participate																							
2021	BOL; 1R	BOL; 1R	BOL; 1R	BOL; 2R	MIL; 1R	MIL; 2R	MIL; 3R	MIL; 3R	NIE; 1R	NIE; 1R	NIE; 1R	NIE; 1R	MIL; 1R	MIL; 1R	MIL; 1R	MIL; 2R	COV; 2R	COV; 2R	COV; 1R	COV; 1R	BAR; 1R	BAR; 2R	BAR; 4R	BAR; 2R	BAR; 1R	BAR; 3R	BAR; 2R	BAR; 1R	BAR; 1R	BAR; 1R							

==== PDC Challenge Tour ====
Season	1	2	3	4	5	6	7	8	9	10	11	12	13	14	15	16	17	18	19	20	21	22	23	24	Prize money	Ranking
2019	WIG; L64	WIG; L16	WIG; QF	WIG; L16	WIG; L128	WIG; L256	DNP		PET; L128	PET; L256	PET; L64	PET; L256	Did not participate												£800	67th
2022	DNP		MIL; L32	MIL; L256	MIL; L128	Did not participate															LEI; L64	LEI; L64	LEI; L32	LEI; W	£2,300	31st
2023	MIL; L64	MIL; L64	MIL; L128	MIL; L32	MIL; L64	Did not participate				MIL; L32	MIL; L128	MIL; L64	MIL; L128	MIL; L64	MIL; L128	MIL; L128	MIL; L64	MIL; L32	MIL; L64	WIG; L64	WIG; L128	WIG; L128	WIG; L32	WIG; L64	£1,475	70th
2024	MIL; L128	MIL; L256	MIL; L256	MIL; L128	MIL; QF	Did not participate										MIL; L128	MIL; L256	MIL; L32	MIL; QF	MIL; L256	LEI; L32	LEI; L64	LEI; L16	LEI; L256	£1,775	53rd
2025	MIL; L64	MIL; L32	MIL; L128	MIL; L64	MIL; L64	HIL; L256	HIL; L32	HIL; L256	HIL; L32	HIL; L128	MIL; L64	MIL; L16	MIL; L256	MIL; L128	MIL; L32	Did not participate					WIG; L128	WIG; L16	WIG; L16	WIG; L32	£2,200	48th
2026	MIL; L256	MIL; L64	MIL; L32	MIL; L256	MIL; L128	LEI; SF	LEI; L256	LEI; L64	LEI; L256	LEI; L64	Did not participate					MIL; L16	MIL; L256	MIL; L256	MIL; L32	MIL; L32	WIG; L16	WIG; L64	WIG; L256	WIG; L256	£2,850	50th

Performance Table Legend
W	Won the tournament	F	Finalist	SF	Semifinalist	QF	Quarterfinalist	#R; RR; Prel.	Lost in # round Round-robin; Preliminary round	DQ	Disqualified
DNQ	Did not qualify	DNP	Did not participate	WD	Withdrew	NH	Tournament not held	#R; RR; Prel.	Lost in # round Round-robin; Preliminary round	NYF	Not yet founded
