= Mick McGowan =

Irish professional darts player (born 1973)

Personal information
- Full name: Michael McGowan
- Nickname: "The Magnet"
- Born: 1 February 1973 (age 53) Duleek, Ireland
- Home town: Balbriggan, Dublin, Ireland

Sport
- Sport: Darts
- Playing since: 1980
- Darts: 25 Gram Red Dragon Signature
- Laterality: Right-handed
- Walk-on music: "Crazy World" by Aslan

Organisation (see split in darts)
- BDO: 2018–2020
- PDC: 2004–2018

WDF major events – best performances
- World Masters: Last 128: 1993, 1994

PDC premier events – best performances
- World Championship: Last 32: 2007, 2008
- World Matchplay: Last 32: 2007
- World Grand Prix: Last 32: 2008, 2009, 2010, 2016
- UK Open: Last 64: 2006, 2007, 2017
- Desert Classic: Last 16: 2006
- US Open/WSoD: Last 16: 2007
- PC Finals: Last 32: 2016

Other tournament wins
- Years
| Ireland Open Autumn Classic | 2006 |
| Tom Kirby Memorial Irish Matchplay | 2015, 2016 |
| Vauxhall Autumn Pro | 2006 |
| INDO Gold Cup | 2019 |

Michael McGowan (born 1 February 1973) is an Irish professional darts player who last played in events for the British Darts Organisation (BDO).

== Career ==
McGowan last played on the PDC pro tour in the Killarney Pro Tour 1 in October 2013 and his last regional match was in the Ireland Players Championship 6 in April 2014. He was once Ireland's top ranked player. Mick picked up the 2006 Ireland Open Classic title with a 7-0 (sets) win over Kevin Painter in the final in Castlebar, County Mayo.

McGowan reached the final of the PDPA Players Championship in Scotland in November 2005 before qualifying for the Las Vegas Desert Classic the following June. He knocked out America's Ray Carver 6–3 in the first round before losing to Wes Newton at the last 16 stage. The Irishman went down 8–7 to Mark Walsh in the third round at the 2006 UK Open Darts finals, but bounced back in Las Vegas to come through the qualifiers.

In the 2007 PDC World Darts Championship he reached the second round before losing to Phil Taylor 4–1 in sets, despite achieving an average of 101.82. He lost in the same round the next year, this time to Kirk Shepherd, who reached the final. In the US Open Darts in 2007 he reached the 5th round before losing to Canadian John Part.

In the 2008 Las Vegas Desert Classic, McGowan played Terry Jenkins in the first round and lost 6–4. He qualified for World Grand Prix finishing Ireland's number 1 player in the order of merit. He drew Jenkins yet again and was beaten 2–0 in sets.

McGowan began sliding down the world rankings in 2009 after a run of bad form led by illness where he was diagnosed with hemochromatosis, where he had too much iron in his blood. He had to go to hospital every week from January to have a pint of blood taken out to thin the iron which affected his practise due to chronic fatigue. McGowan was given the all-clear on the eve of the 2009 World Grand Prix.

In 2010 Mick was defeated by Wayne Mardle in the UK Open by 6 legs to 3.

McGowan represented Ireland with William O'Connor at the inaugural PDC World Cup of Darts in 2010. The pair defeated Slovakia in the first round 6–3 in legs. They then faced Australian duo of Simon Whitlock and Paul Nicholson, and lost the match by 6–5.

He played in his second World Cup for Ireland in 2012, again paired with O'Connor and, as in 2010, they reached the second round this time by defeating Malaysia 5–2. They played the same Australian pair as in 2010 next and were whitewashed 0–4. In the rest of 2012 he could not advance beyond the last 64 of any of his events. McGowan finished the year ranked world number 169, well outside of the top 64 who retain their places on the PDC tour and he did not have automatic entry into any event in the future. In the 2015 Tom Kirby Memorial Irish Matchplay final he beat Tom Biggane 6–5 to qualify for the preliminary round of the 2016 PDC World Championship. At Q School, Mick picked up his tour card via the Q School Order Of Merit by reaching the Final on the fourth day, only to lose to Ross Smith 5–4. However, his run on the final day got him inside the Order Of Merit to qualify, earning him a Tour Card for the 2016 and 2017 seasons. At the World Grand Prix, McGowan lost 2–1 in sets in his first-round match against James Wilson, while at the Players Championship Finals, McGowan beat Chris Dobey in the first round by a score of 6 legs to three, only to lose by the same score to Alan Norris in the next round. McGowan defeated Radoslaw Szaganski 6–5 in the final of 2016 Tom Kirby Memorial Irish Matchplay to qualify for the 2017 PDC World Championship at Alexandra Palace. As one of the three highest-ranked international qualifiers for the event, McGowan received a bye straight through to the first round of the tournament, where he faced Jamie Lewis in a losing effort.

== World Championship results ==
=== PDC ===
- 2007: Second round (lost to Phil Taylor 1–4) (sets)
- 2008: Second round (lost to Kirk Shepherd 3–4)
- 2016: First round (lost to Mark Webster 0–3)
- 2017: First round (lost to Jamie Lewis 2–3)
