= 2011 Grand Slam of Darts =

2011 William Hill Grand Slam of Darts

Tournament information
- Dates: 12–20 November 2011
- Venue: Wolverhampton Civic Hall
- Location: Wolverhampton
- Country: England
- Organisation(s): PDC
- Format: Legs
- Prize fund: £400,000
- Winner's share: £100,000
- High checkout: 161 (England) James Wade (England) Ted Hankey

Champion(s)
- (England) Phil Taylor

The 2011 William Hill Grand Slam of Darts, was the fifth staging of the darts tournament organised by the Professional Darts Corporation. The event took place from 12–20 November 2011 at the Wolverhampton Civic Hall, Wolverhampton, England.

For the first time, Sky Sports was given the television coverage of the Grand Slam after taking over from ITV Sport as the event's broadcaster.

Scott Waites was the defending champion, but he was eliminated in the group stages. The title was won for the fourth time by Phil Taylor, who defeated Gary Anderson 16–4 in the final.

== Prize money ==
Position (num. of players)		Prize money (Total: £400,000)
Winner	(1)	£100,000
Runner-up	(1)	£50,000
Semi-finalists	(2)	£25,000
Quarter-finalists	(4)	£15,000
Last 16 (second round)	(8)	£7,500
Third in group	(8)	£5,000
Fourth in group	(8)	£2,500
Group winner bonus	(8)	£2,500

== Qualifying ==
There were numerous tournaments that provided qualifying opportunities to players. Most tournaments offered a qualifying position for the winner and runner-up of the tournament, however the World Championships and the Grand Slams offered a place in the tournament to all semi-finalists. There were also various other ways of qualifying for overseas players, including those from Europe and the United States, as well as a wildcard qualifying event open to any darts player. The qualifying criteria were changed this year, extending the dates back 5 years for respective World Champions to receive an invite.

=== Qualifying tournaments ===
==== PDC ====
Tournament	Year	Position	Player	Qualifiers
Grand Slam of Darts	2009	Winner	(England) Phil Taylor	(England) Phil Taylor (England) Scott Waites (England) Terry Jenkins (Netherlands) Raymond van Barneveld (England) James Wade (England) Steve Beaton (England) Wayne Jones (Canada) John Part (Wales) Mark Webster (England) Adrian Lewis (Scotland) Gary Anderson (Northern Ireland) Brendan Dolan (England) Wes Newton (Australia) Paul Nicholson (England) Mervyn King (Netherlands) Co Stompé (Wales) Barrie Bates (England) Arron Monk (Netherlands) Michael van Gerwen (England) James Hubbard
Grand Slam of Darts	2009	Runner-Up	(England) Scott Waites	(England) Phil Taylor (England) Scott Waites (England) Terry Jenkins (Netherlands) Raymond van Barneveld (England) James Wade (England) Steve Beaton (England) Wayne Jones (Canada) John Part (Wales) Mark Webster (England) Adrian Lewis (Scotland) Gary Anderson (Northern Ireland) Brendan Dolan (England) Wes Newton (Australia) Paul Nicholson (England) Mervyn King (Netherlands) Co Stompé (Wales) Barrie Bates (England) Arron Monk (Netherlands) Michael van Gerwen (England) James Hubbard
Grand Slam of Darts	2009	Semi-finalists	(England) Terry Jenkins (Netherlands) Raymond van Barneveld	(England) Phil Taylor (England) Scott Waites (England) Terry Jenkins (Netherlands) Raymond van Barneveld (England) James Wade (England) Steve Beaton (England) Wayne Jones (Canada) John Part (Wales) Mark Webster (England) Adrian Lewis (Scotland) Gary Anderson (Northern Ireland) Brendan Dolan (England) Wes Newton (Australia) Paul Nicholson (England) Mervyn King (Netherlands) Co Stompé (Wales) Barrie Bates (England) Arron Monk (Netherlands) Michael van Gerwen (England) James Hubbard
Grand Slam of Darts	2010	Winner	(England) Scott Waites	(England) Phil Taylor (England) Scott Waites (England) Terry Jenkins (Netherlands) Raymond van Barneveld (England) James Wade (England) Steve Beaton (England) Wayne Jones (Canada) John Part (Wales) Mark Webster (England) Adrian Lewis (Scotland) Gary Anderson (Northern Ireland) Brendan Dolan (England) Wes Newton (Australia) Paul Nicholson (England) Mervyn King (Netherlands) Co Stompé (Wales) Barrie Bates (England) Arron Monk (Netherlands) Michael van Gerwen (England) James Hubbard
Grand Slam of Darts	2010	Runner-Up	(England) James Wade	(England) Phil Taylor (England) Scott Waites (England) Terry Jenkins (Netherlands) Raymond van Barneveld (England) James Wade (England) Steve Beaton (England) Wayne Jones (Canada) John Part (Wales) Mark Webster (England) Adrian Lewis (Scotland) Gary Anderson (Northern Ireland) Brendan Dolan (England) Wes Newton (Australia) Paul Nicholson (England) Mervyn King (Netherlands) Co Stompé (Wales) Barrie Bates (England) Arron Monk (Netherlands) Michael van Gerwen (England) James Hubbard
Grand Slam of Darts	2010	Semi-finalists	(England) Steve Beaton (England) Wayne Jones	(England) Phil Taylor (England) Scott Waites (England) Terry Jenkins (Netherlands) Raymond van Barneveld (England) James Wade (England) Steve Beaton (England) Wayne Jones (Canada) John Part (Wales) Mark Webster (England) Adrian Lewis (Scotland) Gary Anderson (Northern Ireland) Brendan Dolan (England) Wes Newton (Australia) Paul Nicholson (England) Mervyn King (Netherlands) Co Stompé (Wales) Barrie Bates (England) Arron Monk (Netherlands) Michael van Gerwen (England) James Hubbard
PDC World Darts Championship	2007	Winner	(Netherlands) Raymond van Barneveld	(England) Phil Taylor (England) Scott Waites (England) Terry Jenkins (Netherlands) Raymond van Barneveld (England) James Wade (England) Steve Beaton (England) Wayne Jones (Canada) John Part (Wales) Mark Webster (England) Adrian Lewis (Scotland) Gary Anderson (Northern Ireland) Brendan Dolan (England) Wes Newton (Australia) Paul Nicholson (England) Mervyn King (Netherlands) Co Stompé (Wales) Barrie Bates (England) Arron Monk (Netherlands) Michael van Gerwen (England) James Hubbard
PDC World Darts Championship	2008	Winner	(Canada) John Part	(England) Phil Taylor (England) Scott Waites (England) Terry Jenkins (Netherlands) Raymond van Barneveld (England) James Wade (England) Steve Beaton (England) Wayne Jones (Canada) John Part (Wales) Mark Webster (England) Adrian Lewis (Scotland) Gary Anderson (Northern Ireland) Brendan Dolan (England) Wes Newton (Australia) Paul Nicholson (England) Mervyn King (Netherlands) Co Stompé (Wales) Barrie Bates (England) Arron Monk (Netherlands) Michael van Gerwen (England) James Hubbard
PDC World Darts Championship	2009	Winner	(England) Phil Taylor	(England) Phil Taylor (England) Scott Waites (England) Terry Jenkins (Netherlands) Raymond van Barneveld (England) James Wade (England) Steve Beaton (England) Wayne Jones (Canada) John Part (Wales) Mark Webster (England) Adrian Lewis (Scotland) Gary Anderson (Northern Ireland) Brendan Dolan (England) Wes Newton (Australia) Paul Nicholson (England) Mervyn King (Netherlands) Co Stompé (Wales) Barrie Bates (England) Arron Monk (Netherlands) Michael van Gerwen (England) James Hubbard
PDC World Darts Championship	2010	Winner	(England) Phil Taylor	(England) Phil Taylor (England) Scott Waites (England) Terry Jenkins (Netherlands) Raymond van Barneveld (England) James Wade (England) Steve Beaton (England) Wayne Jones (Canada) John Part (Wales) Mark Webster (England) Adrian Lewis (Scotland) Gary Anderson (Northern Ireland) Brendan Dolan (England) Wes Newton (Australia) Paul Nicholson (England) Mervyn King (Netherlands) Co Stompé (Wales) Barrie Bates (England) Arron Monk (Netherlands) Michael van Gerwen (England) James Hubbard
PDC World Darts Championship	2010	Runner-Up	(Australia) ~~Simon Whitlock~~ (Note: Ian White was on the reserve list after the Wildcard Qualifier, and replaced Simon Whitlock, when he had to withdraw due to injury.)	(England) Phil Taylor (England) Scott Waites (England) Terry Jenkins (Netherlands) Raymond van Barneveld (England) James Wade (England) Steve Beaton (England) Wayne Jones (Canada) John Part (Wales) Mark Webster (England) Adrian Lewis (Scotland) Gary Anderson (Northern Ireland) Brendan Dolan (England) Wes Newton (Australia) Paul Nicholson (England) Mervyn King (Netherlands) Co Stompé (Wales) Barrie Bates (England) Arron Monk (Netherlands) Michael van Gerwen (England) James Hubbard
PDC World Darts Championship	2010	Third Place	(Wales) Mark Webster	(England) Phil Taylor (England) Scott Waites (England) Terry Jenkins (Netherlands) Raymond van Barneveld (England) James Wade (England) Steve Beaton (England) Wayne Jones (Canada) John Part (Wales) Mark Webster (England) Adrian Lewis (Scotland) Gary Anderson (Northern Ireland) Brendan Dolan (England) Wes Newton (Australia) Paul Nicholson (England) Mervyn King (Netherlands) Co Stompé (Wales) Barrie Bates (England) Arron Monk (Netherlands) Michael van Gerwen (England) James Hubbard
PDC World Darts Championship	2010	Fourth Place	(Netherlands) Raymond van Barneveld	(England) Phil Taylor (England) Scott Waites (England) Terry Jenkins (Netherlands) Raymond van Barneveld (England) James Wade (England) Steve Beaton (England) Wayne Jones (Canada) John Part (Wales) Mark Webster (England) Adrian Lewis (Scotland) Gary Anderson (Northern Ireland) Brendan Dolan (England) Wes Newton (Australia) Paul Nicholson (England) Mervyn King (Netherlands) Co Stompé (Wales) Barrie Bates (England) Arron Monk (Netherlands) Michael van Gerwen (England) James Hubbard
PDC World Darts Championship	2011	Winner	(England) Adrian Lewis	(England) Phil Taylor (England) Scott Waites (England) Terry Jenkins (Netherlands) Raymond van Barneveld (England) James Wade (England) Steve Beaton (England) Wayne Jones (Canada) John Part (Wales) Mark Webster (England) Adrian Lewis (Scotland) Gary Anderson (Northern Ireland) Brendan Dolan (England) Wes Newton (Australia) Paul Nicholson (England) Mervyn King (Netherlands) Co Stompé (Wales) Barrie Bates (England) Arron Monk (Netherlands) Michael van Gerwen (England) James Hubbard
PDC World Darts Championship	2011	Runner-Up	(Scotland) Gary Anderson	(England) Phil Taylor (England) Scott Waites (England) Terry Jenkins (Netherlands) Raymond van Barneveld (England) James Wade (England) Steve Beaton (England) Wayne Jones (Canada) John Part (Wales) Mark Webster (England) Adrian Lewis (Scotland) Gary Anderson (Northern Ireland) Brendan Dolan (England) Wes Newton (Australia) Paul Nicholson (England) Mervyn King (Netherlands) Co Stompé (Wales) Barrie Bates (England) Arron Monk (Netherlands) Michael van Gerwen (England) James Hubbard
PDC World Darts Championship	2011	Semi-finalists	(England) Terry Jenkins (Wales) Mark Webster	(England) Phil Taylor (England) Scott Waites (England) Terry Jenkins (Netherlands) Raymond van Barneveld (England) James Wade (England) Steve Beaton (England) Wayne Jones (Canada) John Part (Wales) Mark Webster (England) Adrian Lewis (Scotland) Gary Anderson (Northern Ireland) Brendan Dolan (England) Wes Newton (Australia) Paul Nicholson (England) Mervyn King (Netherlands) Co Stompé (Wales) Barrie Bates (England) Arron Monk (Netherlands) Michael van Gerwen (England) James Hubbard
World Matchplay	2010	Winner	(England) Phil Taylor	(England) Phil Taylor (England) Scott Waites (England) Terry Jenkins (Netherlands) Raymond van Barneveld (England) James Wade (England) Steve Beaton (England) Wayne Jones (Canada) John Part (Wales) Mark Webster (England) Adrian Lewis (Scotland) Gary Anderson (Northern Ireland) Brendan Dolan (England) Wes Newton (Australia) Paul Nicholson (England) Mervyn King (Netherlands) Co Stompé (Wales) Barrie Bates (England) Arron Monk (Netherlands) Michael van Gerwen (England) James Hubbard
World Matchplay	2010	Runner-Up	(Netherlands) Raymond van Barneveld	(England) Phil Taylor (England) Scott Waites (England) Terry Jenkins (Netherlands) Raymond van Barneveld (England) James Wade (England) Steve Beaton (England) Wayne Jones (Canada) John Part (Wales) Mark Webster (England) Adrian Lewis (Scotland) Gary Anderson (Northern Ireland) Brendan Dolan (England) Wes Newton (Australia) Paul Nicholson (England) Mervyn King (Netherlands) Co Stompé (Wales) Barrie Bates (England) Arron Monk (Netherlands) Michael van Gerwen (England) James Hubbard
World Matchplay	2011	Winner	(England) Phil Taylor	(England) Phil Taylor (England) Scott Waites (England) Terry Jenkins (Netherlands) Raymond van Barneveld (England) James Wade (England) Steve Beaton (England) Wayne Jones (Canada) John Part (Wales) Mark Webster (England) Adrian Lewis (Scotland) Gary Anderson (Northern Ireland) Brendan Dolan (England) Wes Newton (Australia) Paul Nicholson (England) Mervyn King (Netherlands) Co Stompé (Wales) Barrie Bates (England) Arron Monk (Netherlands) Michael van Gerwen (England) James Hubbard
World Matchplay	2011	Runner-Up	(England) James Wade	(England) Phil Taylor (England) Scott Waites (England) Terry Jenkins (Netherlands) Raymond van Barneveld (England) James Wade (England) Steve Beaton (England) Wayne Jones (Canada) John Part (Wales) Mark Webster (England) Adrian Lewis (Scotland) Gary Anderson (Northern Ireland) Brendan Dolan (England) Wes Newton (Australia) Paul Nicholson (England) Mervyn King (Netherlands) Co Stompé (Wales) Barrie Bates (England) Arron Monk (Netherlands) Michael van Gerwen (England) James Hubbard
World Grand Prix	2010	Winner	(England) James Wade	(England) Phil Taylor (England) Scott Waites (England) Terry Jenkins (Netherlands) Raymond van Barneveld (England) James Wade (England) Steve Beaton (England) Wayne Jones (Canada) John Part (Wales) Mark Webster (England) Adrian Lewis (Scotland) Gary Anderson (Northern Ireland) Brendan Dolan (England) Wes Newton (Australia) Paul Nicholson (England) Mervyn King (Netherlands) Co Stompé (Wales) Barrie Bates (England) Arron Monk (Netherlands) Michael van Gerwen (England) James Hubbard
World Grand Prix	2010	Runner-Up	(England) Adrian Lewis	(England) Phil Taylor (England) Scott Waites (England) Terry Jenkins (Netherlands) Raymond van Barneveld (England) James Wade (England) Steve Beaton (England) Wayne Jones (Canada) John Part (Wales) Mark Webster (England) Adrian Lewis (Scotland) Gary Anderson (Northern Ireland) Brendan Dolan (England) Wes Newton (Australia) Paul Nicholson (England) Mervyn King (Netherlands) Co Stompé (Wales) Barrie Bates (England) Arron Monk (Netherlands) Michael van Gerwen (England) James Hubbard
World Grand Prix	2011	Winner	(England) Phil Taylor	(England) Phil Taylor (England) Scott Waites (England) Terry Jenkins (Netherlands) Raymond van Barneveld (England) James Wade (England) Steve Beaton (England) Wayne Jones (Canada) John Part (Wales) Mark Webster (England) Adrian Lewis (Scotland) Gary Anderson (Northern Ireland) Brendan Dolan (England) Wes Newton (Australia) Paul Nicholson (England) Mervyn King (Netherlands) Co Stompé (Wales) Barrie Bates (England) Arron Monk (Netherlands) Michael van Gerwen (England) James Hubbard
World Grand Prix	2011	Runner-Up	(Northern Ireland) Brendan Dolan	(England) Phil Taylor (England) Scott Waites (England) Terry Jenkins (Netherlands) Raymond van Barneveld (England) James Wade (England) Steve Beaton (England) Wayne Jones (Canada) John Part (Wales) Mark Webster (England) Adrian Lewis (Scotland) Gary Anderson (Northern Ireland) Brendan Dolan (England) Wes Newton (Australia) Paul Nicholson (England) Mervyn King (Netherlands) Co Stompé (Wales) Barrie Bates (England) Arron Monk (Netherlands) Michael van Gerwen (England) James Hubbard
UK Open	2010	Winner	(England) Phil Taylor	(England) Phil Taylor (England) Scott Waites (England) Terry Jenkins (Netherlands) Raymond van Barneveld (England) James Wade (England) Steve Beaton (England) Wayne Jones (Canada) John Part (Wales) Mark Webster (England) Adrian Lewis (Scotland) Gary Anderson (Northern Ireland) Brendan Dolan (England) Wes Newton (Australia) Paul Nicholson (England) Mervyn King (Netherlands) Co Stompé (Wales) Barrie Bates (England) Arron Monk (Netherlands) Michael van Gerwen (England) James Hubbard
UK Open	2010	Runner-Up	(Scotland) Gary Anderson	(England) Phil Taylor (England) Scott Waites (England) Terry Jenkins (Netherlands) Raymond van Barneveld (England) James Wade (England) Steve Beaton (England) Wayne Jones (Canada) John Part (Wales) Mark Webster (England) Adrian Lewis (Scotland) Gary Anderson (Northern Ireland) Brendan Dolan (England) Wes Newton (Australia) Paul Nicholson (England) Mervyn King (Netherlands) Co Stompé (Wales) Barrie Bates (England) Arron Monk (Netherlands) Michael van Gerwen (England) James Hubbard
UK Open	2011	Winner	(England) James Wade	(England) Phil Taylor (England) Scott Waites (England) Terry Jenkins (Netherlands) Raymond van Barneveld (England) James Wade (England) Steve Beaton (England) Wayne Jones (Canada) John Part (Wales) Mark Webster (England) Adrian Lewis (Scotland) Gary Anderson (Northern Ireland) Brendan Dolan (England) Wes Newton (Australia) Paul Nicholson (England) Mervyn King (Netherlands) Co Stompé (Wales) Barrie Bates (England) Arron Monk (Netherlands) Michael van Gerwen (England) James Hubbard
UK Open	2011	Runner-Up	(England) Wes Newton	(England) Phil Taylor (England) Scott Waites (England) Terry Jenkins (Netherlands) Raymond van Barneveld (England) James Wade (England) Steve Beaton (England) Wayne Jones (Canada) John Part (Wales) Mark Webster (England) Adrian Lewis (Scotland) Gary Anderson (Northern Ireland) Brendan Dolan (England) Wes Newton (Australia) Paul Nicholson (England) Mervyn King (Netherlands) Co Stompé (Wales) Barrie Bates (England) Arron Monk (Netherlands) Michael van Gerwen (England) James Hubbard
Premier League Darts	2010	Winner	(England) Phil Taylor	(England) Phil Taylor (England) Scott Waites (England) Terry Jenkins (Netherlands) Raymond van Barneveld (England) James Wade (England) Steve Beaton (England) Wayne Jones (Canada) John Part (Wales) Mark Webster (England) Adrian Lewis (Scotland) Gary Anderson (Northern Ireland) Brendan Dolan (England) Wes Newton (Australia) Paul Nicholson (England) Mervyn King (Netherlands) Co Stompé (Wales) Barrie Bates (England) Arron Monk (Netherlands) Michael van Gerwen (England) James Hubbard
Premier League Darts	2010	Runner-Up	(England) James Wade	(England) Phil Taylor (England) Scott Waites (England) Terry Jenkins (Netherlands) Raymond van Barneveld (England) James Wade (England) Steve Beaton (England) Wayne Jones (Canada) John Part (Wales) Mark Webster (England) Adrian Lewis (Scotland) Gary Anderson (Northern Ireland) Brendan Dolan (England) Wes Newton (Australia) Paul Nicholson (England) Mervyn King (Netherlands) Co Stompé (Wales) Barrie Bates (England) Arron Monk (Netherlands) Michael van Gerwen (England) James Hubbard
Premier League Darts	2011	Winner	(Scotland) Gary Anderson	(England) Phil Taylor (England) Scott Waites (England) Terry Jenkins (Netherlands) Raymond van Barneveld (England) James Wade (England) Steve Beaton (England) Wayne Jones (Canada) John Part (Wales) Mark Webster (England) Adrian Lewis (Scotland) Gary Anderson (Northern Ireland) Brendan Dolan (England) Wes Newton (Australia) Paul Nicholson (England) Mervyn King (Netherlands) Co Stompé (Wales) Barrie Bates (England) Arron Monk (Netherlands) Michael van Gerwen (England) James Hubbard
Premier League Darts	2011	Runner-Up	(England) Adrian Lewis	(England) Phil Taylor (England) Scott Waites (England) Terry Jenkins (Netherlands) Raymond van Barneveld (England) James Wade (England) Steve Beaton (England) Wayne Jones (Canada) John Part (Wales) Mark Webster (England) Adrian Lewis (Scotland) Gary Anderson (Northern Ireland) Brendan Dolan (England) Wes Newton (Australia) Paul Nicholson (England) Mervyn King (Netherlands) Co Stompé (Wales) Barrie Bates (England) Arron Monk (Netherlands) Michael van Gerwen (England) James Hubbard
European Championship	2010	Winner	(England) Phil Taylor	(England) Phil Taylor (England) Scott Waites (England) Terry Jenkins (Netherlands) Raymond van Barneveld (England) James Wade (England) Steve Beaton (England) Wayne Jones (Canada) John Part (Wales) Mark Webster (England) Adrian Lewis (Scotland) Gary Anderson (Northern Ireland) Brendan Dolan (England) Wes Newton (Australia) Paul Nicholson (England) Mervyn King (Netherlands) Co Stompé (Wales) Barrie Bates (England) Arron Monk (Netherlands) Michael van Gerwen (England) James Hubbard
European Championship	2010	Runner-Up	(England) Wayne Jones	(England) Phil Taylor (England) Scott Waites (England) Terry Jenkins (Netherlands) Raymond van Barneveld (England) James Wade (England) Steve Beaton (England) Wayne Jones (Canada) John Part (Wales) Mark Webster (England) Adrian Lewis (Scotland) Gary Anderson (Northern Ireland) Brendan Dolan (England) Wes Newton (Australia) Paul Nicholson (England) Mervyn King (Netherlands) Co Stompé (Wales) Barrie Bates (England) Arron Monk (Netherlands) Michael van Gerwen (England) James Hubbard
European Championship	2011	Winner	(England) Phil Taylor	(England) Phil Taylor (England) Scott Waites (England) Terry Jenkins (Netherlands) Raymond van Barneveld (England) James Wade (England) Steve Beaton (England) Wayne Jones (Canada) John Part (Wales) Mark Webster (England) Adrian Lewis (Scotland) Gary Anderson (Northern Ireland) Brendan Dolan (England) Wes Newton (Australia) Paul Nicholson (England) Mervyn King (Netherlands) Co Stompé (Wales) Barrie Bates (England) Arron Monk (Netherlands) Michael van Gerwen (England) James Hubbard
European Championship	2011	Runner-Up	(England) Adrian Lewis	(England) Phil Taylor (England) Scott Waites (England) Terry Jenkins (Netherlands) Raymond van Barneveld (England) James Wade (England) Steve Beaton (England) Wayne Jones (Canada) John Part (Wales) Mark Webster (England) Adrian Lewis (Scotland) Gary Anderson (Northern Ireland) Brendan Dolan (England) Wes Newton (Australia) Paul Nicholson (England) Mervyn King (Netherlands) Co Stompé (Wales) Barrie Bates (England) Arron Monk (Netherlands) Michael van Gerwen (England) James Hubbard
Championship League Darts	2010	Winner	(England) James Wade	(England) Phil Taylor (England) Scott Waites (England) Terry Jenkins (Netherlands) Raymond van Barneveld (England) James Wade (England) Steve Beaton (England) Wayne Jones (Canada) John Part (Wales) Mark Webster (England) Adrian Lewis (Scotland) Gary Anderson (Northern Ireland) Brendan Dolan (England) Wes Newton (Australia) Paul Nicholson (England) Mervyn King (Netherlands) Co Stompé (Wales) Barrie Bates (England) Arron Monk (Netherlands) Michael van Gerwen (England) James Hubbard
Championship League Darts	2010	Runner-Up	(England) Phil Taylor	(England) Phil Taylor (England) Scott Waites (England) Terry Jenkins (Netherlands) Raymond van Barneveld (England) James Wade (England) Steve Beaton (England) Wayne Jones (Canada) John Part (Wales) Mark Webster (England) Adrian Lewis (Scotland) Gary Anderson (Northern Ireland) Brendan Dolan (England) Wes Newton (Australia) Paul Nicholson (England) Mervyn King (Netherlands) Co Stompé (Wales) Barrie Bates (England) Arron Monk (Netherlands) Michael van Gerwen (England) James Hubbard
Championship League Darts	2011	Winner	(England) Phil Taylor	(England) Phil Taylor (England) Scott Waites (England) Terry Jenkins (Netherlands) Raymond van Barneveld (England) James Wade (England) Steve Beaton (England) Wayne Jones (Canada) John Part (Wales) Mark Webster (England) Adrian Lewis (Scotland) Gary Anderson (Northern Ireland) Brendan Dolan (England) Wes Newton (Australia) Paul Nicholson (England) Mervyn King (Netherlands) Co Stompé (Wales) Barrie Bates (England) Arron Monk (Netherlands) Michael van Gerwen (England) James Hubbard
Championship League Darts	2011	Runner-Up	(Australia) Paul Nicholson	(England) Phil Taylor (England) Scott Waites (England) Terry Jenkins (Netherlands) Raymond van Barneveld (England) James Wade (England) Steve Beaton (England) Wayne Jones (Canada) John Part (Wales) Mark Webster (England) Adrian Lewis (Scotland) Gary Anderson (Northern Ireland) Brendan Dolan (England) Wes Newton (Australia) Paul Nicholson (England) Mervyn King (Netherlands) Co Stompé (Wales) Barrie Bates (England) Arron Monk (Netherlands) Michael van Gerwen (England) James Hubbard
Players Championship Finals	2010	Winner	(Australia) Paul Nicholson	(England) Phil Taylor (England) Scott Waites (England) Terry Jenkins (Netherlands) Raymond van Barneveld (England) James Wade (England) Steve Beaton (England) Wayne Jones (Canada) John Part (Wales) Mark Webster (England) Adrian Lewis (Scotland) Gary Anderson (Northern Ireland) Brendan Dolan (England) Wes Newton (Australia) Paul Nicholson (England) Mervyn King (Netherlands) Co Stompé (Wales) Barrie Bates (England) Arron Monk (Netherlands) Michael van Gerwen (England) James Hubbard
Players Championship Finals	2010	Runner-Up	(England) Mervyn King	(England) Phil Taylor (England) Scott Waites (England) Terry Jenkins (Netherlands) Raymond van Barneveld (England) James Wade (England) Steve Beaton (England) Wayne Jones (Canada) John Part (Wales) Mark Webster (England) Adrian Lewis (Scotland) Gary Anderson (Northern Ireland) Brendan Dolan (England) Wes Newton (Australia) Paul Nicholson (England) Mervyn King (Netherlands) Co Stompé (Wales) Barrie Bates (England) Arron Monk (Netherlands) Michael van Gerwen (England) James Hubbard
Players Championship Finals	2011 (1)	Winner	(England) Phil Taylor	(England) Phil Taylor (England) Scott Waites (England) Terry Jenkins (Netherlands) Raymond van Barneveld (England) James Wade (England) Steve Beaton (England) Wayne Jones (Canada) John Part (Wales) Mark Webster (England) Adrian Lewis (Scotland) Gary Anderson (Northern Ireland) Brendan Dolan (England) Wes Newton (Australia) Paul Nicholson (England) Mervyn King (Netherlands) Co Stompé (Wales) Barrie Bates (England) Arron Monk (Netherlands) Michael van Gerwen (England) James Hubbard
Players Championship Finals	2011 (1)	Runner-Up	(Scotland) Gary Anderson	(England) Phil Taylor (England) Scott Waites (England) Terry Jenkins (Netherlands) Raymond van Barneveld (England) James Wade (England) Steve Beaton (England) Wayne Jones (Canada) John Part (Wales) Mark Webster (England) Adrian Lewis (Scotland) Gary Anderson (Northern Ireland) Brendan Dolan (England) Wes Newton (Australia) Paul Nicholson (England) Mervyn King (Netherlands) Co Stompé (Wales) Barrie Bates (England) Arron Monk (Netherlands) Michael van Gerwen (England) James Hubbard
PDC World Cup of Darts	2010	Winners	(Netherlands) Raymond van Barneveld (Netherlands) Co Stompé	(England) Phil Taylor (England) Scott Waites (England) Terry Jenkins (Netherlands) Raymond van Barneveld (England) James Wade (England) Steve Beaton (England) Wayne Jones (Canada) John Part (Wales) Mark Webster (England) Adrian Lewis (Scotland) Gary Anderson (Northern Ireland) Brendan Dolan (England) Wes Newton (Australia) Paul Nicholson (England) Mervyn King (Netherlands) Co Stompé (Wales) Barrie Bates (England) Arron Monk (Netherlands) Michael van Gerwen (England) James Hubbard
PDC World Cup of Darts	2010	Runners-Up	(Wales) Mark Webster (Wales) Barrie Bates	(England) Phil Taylor (England) Scott Waites (England) Terry Jenkins (Netherlands) Raymond van Barneveld (England) James Wade (England) Steve Beaton (England) Wayne Jones (Canada) John Part (Wales) Mark Webster (England) Adrian Lewis (Scotland) Gary Anderson (Northern Ireland) Brendan Dolan (England) Wes Newton (Australia) Paul Nicholson (England) Mervyn King (Netherlands) Co Stompé (Wales) Barrie Bates (England) Arron Monk (Netherlands) Michael van Gerwen (England) James Hubbard
PDC World Youth Championship	2011	Winner	(England) Arron Monk	(England) Phil Taylor (England) Scott Waites (England) Terry Jenkins (Netherlands) Raymond van Barneveld (England) James Wade (England) Steve Beaton (England) Wayne Jones (Canada) John Part (Wales) Mark Webster (England) Adrian Lewis (Scotland) Gary Anderson (Northern Ireland) Brendan Dolan (England) Wes Newton (Australia) Paul Nicholson (England) Mervyn King (Netherlands) Co Stompé (Wales) Barrie Bates (England) Arron Monk (Netherlands) Michael van Gerwen (England) James Hubbard
PDC World Youth Championship	2012	Finalists	(Netherlands) Michael van Gerwen (England) James Hubbard	(England) Phil Taylor (England) Scott Waites (England) Terry Jenkins (Netherlands) Raymond van Barneveld (England) James Wade (England) Steve Beaton (England) Wayne Jones (Canada) John Part (Wales) Mark Webster (England) Adrian Lewis (Scotland) Gary Anderson (Northern Ireland) Brendan Dolan (England) Wes Newton (Australia) Paul Nicholson (England) Mervyn King (Netherlands) Co Stompé (Wales) Barrie Bates (England) Arron Monk (Netherlands) Michael van Gerwen (England) James Hubbard
Note: Players in italics had already qualified for the tournament.				(England) Phil Taylor (England) Scott Waites (England) Terry Jenkins (Netherlands) Raymond van Barneveld (England) James Wade (England) Steve Beaton (England) Wayne Jones (Canada) John Part (Wales) Mark Webster (England) Adrian Lewis (Scotland) Gary Anderson (Northern Ireland) Brendan Dolan (England) Wes Newton (Australia) Paul Nicholson (England) Mervyn King (Netherlands) Co Stompé (Wales) Barrie Bates (England) Arron Monk (Netherlands) Michael van Gerwen (England) James Hubbard

==== BDO ====
Tournament	Year	Position	Player	Qualifiers
BDO World Darts Championship	2007	Winner	(England) ~~Martin Adams~~	(England) Ted Hankey (England) Dave Chisnall (England) Tony O'Shea (Wales) Martin Phillips (England) Dean Winstanley (Netherlands) Jan Dekker
BDO World Darts Championship	2008	Winner	(Wales) Mark Webster	(England) Ted Hankey (England) Dave Chisnall (England) Tony O'Shea (Wales) Martin Phillips (England) Dean Winstanley (Netherlands) Jan Dekker
BDO World Darts Championship	2009	Winner	(England) Ted Hankey	(England) Ted Hankey (England) Dave Chisnall (England) Tony O'Shea (Wales) Martin Phillips (England) Dean Winstanley (Netherlands) Jan Dekker
BDO World Darts Championship	2010	Winner	(England) ~~Martin Adams~~	(England) Ted Hankey (England) Dave Chisnall (England) Tony O'Shea (Wales) Martin Phillips (England) Dean Winstanley (Netherlands) Jan Dekker
BDO World Darts Championship	2010	Runner-Up	(England) Dave Chisnall	(England) Ted Hankey (England) Dave Chisnall (England) Tony O'Shea (Wales) Martin Phillips (England) Dean Winstanley (Netherlands) Jan Dekker
BDO World Darts Championship	2010	Semi-finalists	(England) Tony O'Shea (Wales) Martin Phillips	(England) Ted Hankey (England) Dave Chisnall (England) Tony O'Shea (Wales) Martin Phillips (England) Dean Winstanley (Netherlands) Jan Dekker
BDO World Darts Championship	2011	Winner	(England) ~~Martin Adams~~	(England) Ted Hankey (England) Dave Chisnall (England) Tony O'Shea (Wales) Martin Phillips (England) Dean Winstanley (Netherlands) Jan Dekker
BDO World Darts Championship	2011	Runner-Up	(England) Dean Winstanley	(England) Ted Hankey (England) Dave Chisnall (England) Tony O'Shea (Wales) Martin Phillips (England) Dean Winstanley (Netherlands) Jan Dekker
BDO World Darts Championship	2011	Semi-finalists	(Netherlands) Jan Dekker (Wales) Martin Phillips	(England) Ted Hankey (England) Dave Chisnall (England) Tony O'Shea (Wales) Martin Phillips (England) Dean Winstanley (Netherlands) Jan Dekker
Note: Players in italics had already qualified for the tournament.				(England) Ted Hankey (England) Dave Chisnall (England) Tony O'Shea (Wales) Martin Phillips (England) Dean Winstanley (Netherlands) Jan Dekker

==== Other qualifiers ====
Criteria	Player
Grand Slam of Darts Wildcards	(England) Nigel Heydon (Sweden) Magnus Caris (England) Ian White
Highest Ranked Non-Qualifier On PDC Order of Merit	(England) Mark Walsh
Highest Ranked Non-Qualifier On Players Championship Order Of Merit	(England) Justin Pipe
European Order of Merit Leader	(Netherlands) Vincent van der Voort

== Pools ==
Pool A	Pool B	Pool C	Pool D
(Seeded Players)	(qualifiers)		
(England) Scott Waites (1) (England) Phil Taylor (2) (England) Adrian Lewis (3) (England) James Wade (4) (Scotland) Gary Anderson (5) (Wales) Mark Webster (6) (England) Wes Newton (7) (Netherlands) Raymond van Barneveld (8)	(Australia) Paul Nicholson (England) Terry Jenkins (England) Mervyn King (England) Mark Walsh (England) Wayne Jones (Netherlands) Vincent van der Voort (England) Dean Winstanley (Netherlands) Jan Dekker	(Netherlands) Co Stompé (Northern Ireland) Brendan Dolan (Canada) John Part (England) Justin Pipe (England) Steve Beaton (Wales) Barrie Bates (England) Tony O'Shea (England) Ted Hankey	(Netherlands) Michael van Gerwen (England) Dave Chisnall (England) Nigel Heydon (England) Ian White (Sweden) Magnus Caris (England) Arron Monk (Wales) Martin Phillips (England) James Hubbard

== Draw and results ==
=== Group stages ===
all matches first-to-5/best of 9.

NB in Brackets: Number = Seeds; BDO = BDO Darts player; RQ = Ranking qualifier; Q = Qualifier
NB: P = Played; W = Won; L = Lost; LF = Legs for; LA = Legs against; +/- = Plus/minus record, in relation to legs; Average – 3-dart average; Pts = Points

==== Group A ====
POS	Player	P	W	L	LF	LA	+/-	Pts	Status
1	(Netherlands) Michael van Gerwen	3	2	1	13	10	+3	4	Advance to the last 16
2	(England) Mark Walsh (RQ)	3	2	1	12	10	+2	4	Advance to the last 16
3	(England) Scott Waites (BDO, 1)	3	1	2	12	12	0	2	Eliminated
4	(England) Tony O'Shea (BDO)	3	1	2	9	14	−5	2	Eliminated

12 November

85.24 Mark Walsh (England)	5 – 2	(England) Tony O'Shea 85.10
94.06 Scott Waites (England)	3 – 5	(Netherlands) Michael van Gerwen 101.84

13 November

84.65 Scott Waites (England)	4 – 5	(England) Tony O'Shea 92.09
90.86 Mark Walsh (England)	5 – 3	(Netherlands) Michael van Gerwen 85.98

15 November

100.73 Scott Waites (England)	5 – 2	(England) Mark Walsh 94.99
90.06 Tony O'Shea (England)	2 – 5	(Netherlands) Michael van Gerwen 96.06

==== Group B ====
POS	Player	P	W	L	LF	LA	+/-	Pts	Status
1	(England) Dean Winstanley (BDO)	3	3	0	15	6	+9	6	Advance to the last 16
2	(England) Ted Hankey (BDO)	3	2	1	10	9	+1	4	Advance to the last 16
3	(England) Ian White (Q)	3	1	2	11	12	−1	2	Eliminated
4	(Netherlands) Raymond van Barneveld (8)	3	0	3	8	15	−7	0	Eliminated

12 November

85.40 Dean Winstanley (England)	5 – 0	(England) Ted Hankey 79.96
86.16 Raymond van Barneveld (Netherlands)	4 – 5	(England) Ian White 86.11

13 November

90.74 Dean Winstanley (England)	5 – 4	(England) Ian White 91.52
89.19 Raymond van Barneveld (Netherlands)	2 – 5	(England) Ted Hankey 88.94

15 November

85.12 Raymond van Barneveld (Netherlands)	2 – 5	(England) Dean Winstanley 92.68
100.05 Ted Hankey (England)	5 – 2	(England) Ian White 88.92

==== Group C ====
POS	Player	P	W	L	LF	LA	+/-	Pts	Status
1	(Scotland) Gary Anderson (5)	3	2	1	13	7	+6	4	Advance to the last 16
2	(England) Wayne Jones	3	2	1	11	10	+1	4	Advance to the last 16
3	(England) Nigel Heydon (Q)	3	1	2	11	13	−2	2	Eliminated
4	(Northern Ireland) Brendan Dolan	3	1	2	8	13	−5	2	Eliminated

12 November

96.51 Wayne Jones (England)	5 – 2	(Northern Ireland) Brendan Dolan 86.39
88.55 Gary Anderson (Scotland)	3 – 5	(England) Nigel Heydon 84.67

13 November

104.60 Gary Anderson (Scotland)	5 – 1	(Northern Ireland) Brendan Dolan 90.49
98.03 Wayne Jones (England)	5 – 3	(England) Nigel Heydon 93.51

15 November

93.91 Brendan Dolan (Northern Ireland)	5 – 3	(England) Nigel Heydon 90.25
90.61 Gary Anderson (Scotland)	5 – 1	(England) Wayne Jones 76.34

==== Group D ====
POS	Player	P	W	L	LF	LA	+/-	Pts	Status
1	(England) Terry Jenkins	3	2	1	11	11	0	4	Advance to the last 16
2	(England) James Wade (4)	3	2	1	13	13	0	4	Advance to the last 16
3	(England) Justin Pipe (RQ)	3	1	2	13	11	+2	2	Eliminated
4	(England) Dave Chisnall	3	1	2	12	14	−2	2	Eliminated

12 November

100.63 James Wade (England)	5 – 4	(England) Dave Chisnall 96.42
85.32 Terry Jenkins (England)	1 – 5	(England) Justin Pipe 85.79

13 November

96.74 Terry Jenkins (England)	5 – 3	(England) Dave Chisnall 95.17
88.68 James Wade (England)	5 – 4	(England) Justin Pipe 93.34

15 November

92.18 Justin Pipe (England)	4 – 5	(England) Dave Chisnall 88.66
93.80 James Wade (England)	3 – 5	(England) Terry Jenkins 94.77

==== Group E ====
POS	Player	P	W	L	LF	LA	+/-	Pts	Status
1	(England) Phil Taylor (2)	3	3	0	15	7	+8	6	Advance to the last 16
2	(England) Steve Beaton	3	2	1	13	10	+3	4	Advance to the last 16
3	(England) Mervyn King	3	1	2	11	13	−2	2	Eliminated
4	(England) James Hubbard	3	0	3	6	15	−9	0	Eliminated

13 November

85.88 Mervyn King (England)	3 – 5	(England) Steve Beaton 86.65
94.67 Phil Taylor (England)	5 – 1	(England) James Hubbard 83.13

14 November

90.09 Mervyn King (England)	5 – 3	(England) James Hubbard 76.59
99.72 Phil Taylor (England)	5 – 3	(England) Steve Beaton 92.22

16 November

91.55 Steve Beaton (England)	5 – 2	(England) James Hubbard 85.98
100.93 Phil Taylor (England)	5 – 3	(England) Mervyn King 98.10

==== Group F ====
POS	Player	P	W	L	LF	LA	+/-	Pts	Status
1	(Australia) Paul Nicholson	3	3	0	15	8	+7	6	Advance to the last 16
2	(England) Wes Newton (7)	3	2	1	14	8	+6	4	Advance to the last 16
3	(Sweden) Magnus Caris (Q)	3	1	2	11	11	0	2	Eliminated
4	(Wales) Barrie Bates	3	0	3	2	15	−13	0	Eliminated

13 November

92.78 Paul Nicholson (Australia)	5 – 0	(Wales) Barrie Bates 71.30
85.07 Wes Newton (England)	5 – 2	(Sweden) Magnus Caris 87.86

14 November

83.29 Barrie Bates (Wales)	1 – 5	(Sweden) Magnus Caris 94.86
87.20 Wes Newton (England)	4 – 5	(Australia) Paul Nicholson 96.50

16 November

94.31 Wes Newton (England)	5 – 1	(Wales) Barrie Bates 80.21
99.37 Paul Nicholson (Australia)	5 – 4	(Sweden) Magnus Caris 101.52

==== Group G ====
POS	Player	P	W	L	LF	LA	+/-	Pts	Status
1	(Wales) Mark Webster (6)	3	3	0	15	8	+7	6	Advance to the last 16
2	(Canada) John Part	3	2	1	11	10	+1	4	Advance to the last 16
3	(Netherlands) Jan Dekker (BDO)	3	1	2	10	11	−1	2	Eliminated
4	(England) Arron Monk	3	0	3	8	15	−7	0	Eliminated

13 November

95.42 Mark Webster (Wales)	5 – 4	(England) Arron Monk 84.40
73.23 Jan Dekker (Netherlands)	2 – 5	(Canada) John Part 80.90

14 November

92.00 Jan Dekker (Netherlands)	5 – 1	(England) Arron Monk 87.93
95.30 Mark Webster (Wales)	5 – 1	(Canada) John Part 83.52

16 November

90.79 John Part (Canada)	5 – 3	(England) Arron Monk 86.01
101.43 Mark Webster (Wales)	5 – 3	(Netherlands) Jan Dekker 91.21

==== Group H ====
POS	Player	P	W	L	LF	LA	+/-	Pts	Status
1	(England) Adrian Lewis (3)	3	3	0	15	7	+8	6	Advance to the last 16
2	(Wales) Martin Phillips (BDO)	3	2	1	14	9	+5	4	Advance to the last 16
3	(Netherlands) Co Stompé	3	1	2	8	13	−5	2	Eliminated
4	(Netherlands) Vincent van der Voort (RQ)	3	0	3	7	15	−8	0	Eliminated

13 November

98.00 Vincent van der Voort (Netherlands)	3 – 5	(Netherlands) Co Stompé 91.63
89.75 Adrian Lewis (England)	5 – 4	(Wales) Martin Phillips 97.11

14 November

74.86 Vincent van der Voort (Netherlands)	2 – 5	(Wales) Martin Phillips 88.38
109.39 Adrian Lewis (England)	5 – 1	(Netherlands) Co Stompé 98.96

16 November

91.57 Adrian Lewis (England)	5 – 2	(Netherlands) Vincent van der Voort 88.73
89.07 Co Stompé (Netherlands)	2 – 5	(Wales) Martin Phillips 91.47

=== Knockout stages ===
Second round (best of 19 legs); 17–18 November
A1	(Netherlands) Michael van Gerwen 90.42	9
B2	(England) Ted Hankey (BDO) 91.23	10
B1	(England) Dean Winstanley (BDO) 104.55	9
A2	(England) Mark Walsh (RQ) 98.32	10
C1	(Scotland) Gary Anderson (5) 100.45	10
D2	(England) James Wade (4) 96.83	3
D1	(England) Terry Jenkins 95.35	10
C2	(England) Wayne Jones 91.87	8
E1	(England) Phil Taylor (2) 112.37	10
F2	(England) Wes Newton (7) 94.15	3
F1	(Australia) Paul Nicholson 96.43	10
E2	(England) Steve Beaton 95.06	8
G1	(Wales) Mark Webster (6) 89.59	10
H2	(Wales) Martin Phillips (BDO) 84.91	8
H1	(England) Adrian Lewis (3) 92.75	10
G2	(Canada) John Part 92.44	8

Quarter-finals (best of 31 legs); 19 November
B2	(England) Ted Hankey (BDO) 89.54	14
A2	(England) Mark Walsh (RQ) 91.82	16
C1	(Scotland) Gary Anderson (5) 99.97	16
D1	(England) Terry Jenkins 93.59	12
E1	(England) Phil Taylor (2) 104.46	16
F1	(Australia) Paul Nicholson 95.24	7
G1	(Wales) Mark Webster (6) 94.59	5
H1	(England) Adrian Lewis (3) 100.30	16

Semi-finals (best of 31 legs); 20 November
A2	(England) Mark Walsh (RQ) 88.81	11
C1	(Scotland) Gary Anderson (5) 94.77	16
E1	(England) Phil Taylor (2) 107.76	16
H1	(England) Adrian Lewis (3) 101.10	9

Final (best of 31 legs); 20 November
C1	(Scotland) Gary Anderson (5) 98.92	4
E1	(England) Phil Taylor (2) 109.04	16

== Statistics ==
Player	Eliminated	Played	Legs Won	Legs Lost	100+	140+	180s	High checkout	3-dart average
(England) Phil Taylor	Winner	7	73	30	135	83	29	124	103.32
(Scotland) Gary Anderson	Final	7	59	49	133	79	41	140	96.49
(England) Adrian Lewis	Semi-finals	6	50	36	99	59	30	152	97.42
(England) Mark Walsh	Semi-finals	6	49	49	148	58	22	138	91.67
(Australia) Paul Nicholson	Quarter-finals	5	32	32	79	50	20	144	96.06
(Wales) Mark Webster	Quarter-finals	5	30	32	84	44	15	111	95.27
(England) Terry Jenkins	Quarter-finals	5	33	35	99	42	16	126	93.27
(England) Ted Hankey	Quarter-finals	5	34	34	90	51	18	161	89.94
(Canada) John Part	Second round	4	19	20	37	20	9	118	86.91
(England) James Wade	Second round	4	16	23	58	28	5	161	94.99
(Netherlands) Michael van Gerwen	Second round	4	22	20	55	23	6	144	93.58
(England) Dean Winstanley	Second round	4	24	16	45	29	17	138	93.34
(England) Steve Beaton	Second round	4	21	20	59	23	7	141	91.37
(England) Wayne Jones	Second round	4	19	20	53	27	8	122	90.69
(Wales) Martin Phillips	Second round	4	22	19	58	36	5	100	90.47
(England) Wes Newton	Second round	4	17	18	41	14	10	100	90.18
(Netherlands) Raymond van Barneveld	Group stage	3	8	15	25	19	1	80	86.82
(England) Arron Monk	Group stage	3	8	15	22	13	5	60	86.11
(Netherlands) Jan Dekker	Group stage	3	10	11	30	8	1	104	85.48
(England) James Hubbard	Group stage	3	6	15	20	14	1	40	81.90
(Sweden) Magnus Caris	Group stage	3	11	11	26	28	2	81	94.75
(England) Dave Chisnall	Group stage	3	12	14	30	12	9	86	93.42
(England) Justin Pipe	Group stage	3	13	11	33	22	2	160	90.44
(Northern Ireland) Brendan Dolan	Group stage	3	8	13	30	19	1	101	90.26
(England) Mervyn King	Group stage	3	11	13	25	22	5	101	91.36
(Netherlands) Co Stompé	Group stage	3	8	13	33	12	4	121	93.22
(England) Scott Waites	Group stage	3	12	12	28	13	8	125	93.15
(England) Nigel Heydon	Group stage	3	11	13	27	14	5	121	89.48
(England) Ian White	Group stage	3	11	14	29	11	8	112	88.85
(Netherlands) Vincent van der Voort	Group stage	3	7	15	30	14	3	101	87.20
(England) Tony O'Shea	Group stage	3	9	14	33	12	8	64	92.78
(Wales) Barrie Bates	Group stage	3	2	15	27	7	0	72	78.27
