= Canadian Open (darts) =

Annual darts tournament in Canada

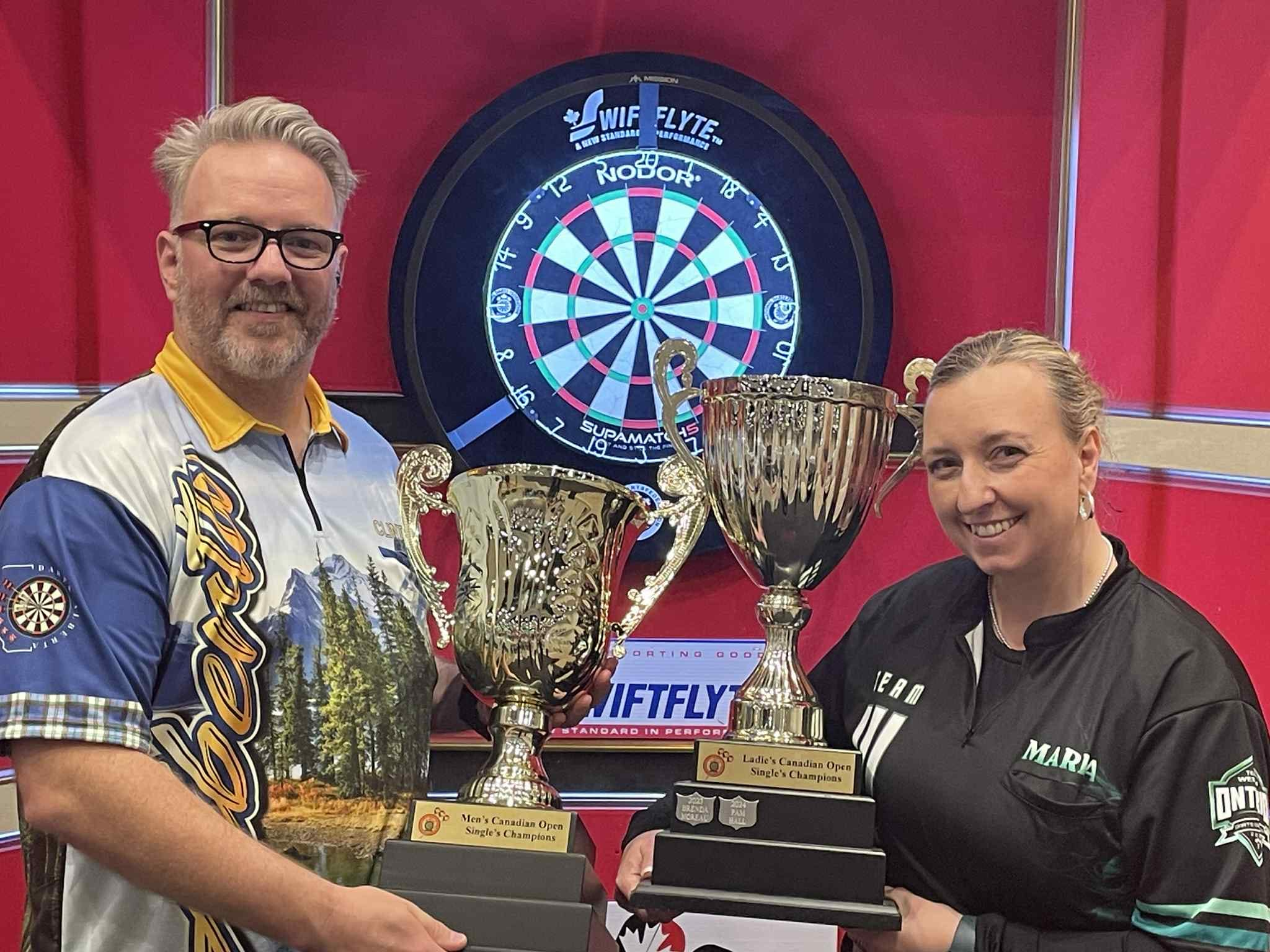
- 2025 Canadian Open Champions Clint Clarkson (Men's) and Maria Carli (Women's)

Tournament information
- Venue: Changes Annually
- Location: Changes Annually
- Country: Canada
- Established: 1977
- Organisation(s): NDFC / BDO, category D / WDF category 2
- Format: Legs
- Prize fund: C$26,900
- Month(s) Played: June

Current champion(s)
- Men's: (Canada) Clint Clarkson; Women's: (Canada) Maria Carli

The Canadian Open is a darts tournament that has been held annually since 1977.

== List of tournaments ==
=== Men's ===
Year	Champion	Score (legs)	Runner-up	Total prize money	Champion	Runner-up
1977	(Canada) Allan Hogg	?–?	(Canada) Hillyard Rossiter	?	?	?
1978	(United States) Len Heard	?–?	(England) John Lowe	?	?	?
1979	(England) John Lowe	?–?	(England) Eric Bristow	?	?	?
1980	(United States) Len Heard (2)	?–?	(England) Joe Dodd	?	?	?
1981	(Scotland) Jocky Wilson	?–?	(United States) Kevin Mullaney	?	?	?
1982	(England) Dave Whitcombe	?–?	(England) Cliff Lazarenko	?	?	?
1983	(Canada) Alex MacKinnon	?–?	(Canada) Bob Sinnaeve	?	?	?
1984	(England) John Lowe (2)	?–?	(Northern Ireland) Steve Brennan	?	?	?
1985	(Canada) Rick Bisaro	?–?	(Canada) Dave Green	?	?	?
1986	(England) John Lowe (3)	4–2	(England) Ken Summers	?	?	?
1987	(England) John Lowe (4)	?–?	(England) Bob Anderson	?	?	?
1988	(England) Phil Taylor	5–1	(England) Bob Anderson	C$5,000	?	?
1989	(England) John Lowe (5)	5–0	(United States) Tony Payne	?	?	?
1990	(England) Bob Anderson	?–?	(England) Phil Taylor	?	?	?
1991	(England) Mike Gregory	?–?	(England) Bob Anderson	?	?	?
1992	(England) Bob Anderson (2)	?–?	(England) Dennis Priestley	?	?	?
1993	(England) Dennis Priestley	5–4	(England) Rod Harrington	?	?	?
1994	(England) Dennis Priestley (2)	?–?	(England) Rod Harrington	?	?	?
1995	(Canada) John Part	?–?	(Canada) Carl Mercer	?	?	?
1996	(Canada) Carl Mercer	?–?	(Canada) John Part	?	?	?
1997	(Canada) Shawn Brenneman	5–4	(Belgium) Tanguy Borra	?	?	?
1998	(Netherlands) Raymond van Barneveld	?–?	(Canada) Don MacDougall	?	?	?
1999	(England) Matt Clark	?–?	(England) Colin Monk	?	?	?
2000	(England) Peter Manley	?–?	(England) Kevin Painter	?	?	?
2001	(Canada) John Part (2)	?–?	(England) Matt Clark	?	?	?
2002	(Canada) Marcel Simard	?–?	(Canada) Carl Mercer	?	?	?
2003	(Canada) Marcel Simard (2)	?–?	(Canada) Greg Lewis	?	?	?
2004	(Canada) John Part (3)	?–?	(Canada) Jerry Hull	C$3,380	C$1,100	C$600
2005	(Canada) Dan Olson	?–?	(Canada) Andre Carman	?	?	?
2006	(Canada) John DeGrunchy	?–?	(England) Tony Eccles	?	?	?
2007	(Wales) Mark Webster	?–?	(Canada) Norm Tremblay	C$3,280	C$1,000	C$500
2008	(Canada) Jerry Hull	?–?	(Canada) Danny MacInnis	C$3,280	C$1,000	C$500
2009	(Canada) Jerry Hull (2)	?–?	(Canada) Rodney Spencer	C$3,280	C$1,000	C$500
2010	(Canada) Terry Hayhurst	5–3	(Canada) Kenny MacNeil	C$3,280	C$1,000	C$500
2011	(Canada) Dave Cameron	?–?	(Canada) Bruce Davey	C$3,280	C$1,000	C$500
2012	(Canada) Terry Hayhurst (2)	bt	(Canada) Kenny MacNeil	C$4,500	C$1,500	C$750
2013	(Canada) Shaun Narain	bt	(Canada) Bernie Miller	C$4,500	C$1,500	C$750
2014	(Canada) Jeff Smith	bt	(Canada) Gary Vinicombe	C$4,500	C$1,500	C$750
2015	(Canada) Rory Orvis	?–?	(Canada) Gordon Mills	C$5,300	C$1,500	C$750
2016	(Canada) Kiley Edmunds	?–?	(Canada) Jeff Smith	C$5,300	C$1,500	C$750
2017	(Canada) Dave Cameron (2)	?–?	(Canada) Jeff Smith	C$5,300	C$1,500	C$750
2018	(Canada) Nick Smith	?–?	(Canada) Paul Bolduc	C$5,300	C$1,500	C$750
2019	(Canada) Jeff Smith (2)	?–?	(Canada) Dave Cameron	C$5,300	C$1,500	C$750
2022	(Canada) Nick Smith (2)	5-0	(Canada) Jim Long	C$4,500	C$900	C$600
2023	(Canada) Jim Long	?–?	(Canada) Nelson Bacus	C$7,500	C$3,000	C$1,500
2024	(Canada) Matt Campbell	5-4	(Canada) Kevin Adley	C$7,500	C$3,000	C$1,500
2025	(Canada) Clint Clarkson	5-2	(Canada) Darryl Christie	C$7,200	C$2,000	C$1,000

=== Women's ===
Year	Champion	Score (legs)	Runner-up	Total prize money	Champion	Runner-up
1985	(Canada) Sharon McGean	?–?				
1986	(Canada) Rani Gill	?–?				
1987	(England) Sharon Colclough	?–?				
1988	(England) Sharon Colclough (2)	?–?				
1989	(England) Sharon Colclough (3)	?–?				
1990	(England) Sharon Colclough (4)	?–?				
1991	(United States) Eva Grigsby	?–?				
1992	(England) Mandy Solomons	?–?				
1993	(Canada) Patricia Farrell	?–?				
1994	(Canada) Andrea Sorensen	?–?				
1995	(Canada) Patricia Farrell (2)	?–?				
1996	(United States) Stacy Bromberg	?–?				
1997	(Netherlands) Francisca Hoenselaar	?–?				
1998	(United States) Lori Verier	?–?				
1999	(England) Crissy Howatt	?–?				
2000	(Canada) Gayl King	?–?				
2001	(Belgium) Vicky Pruim	?–?				
2002	(Canada) Gayl King (2)	?–?				
2003	(Canada) Gayl King (3)	?–?				
2004	(Sweden) Anna Karin Mannerstahl	?–?				
2005	(Canada) Cindy Pardy	?–?				
2006	(Canada) Jenelle Legge	?–?				
2007	(Canada) Kim Whaley-Hilts	?–?				
2008	(Canada) Jenelle Legge (2)	?–?				
2009	(Canada) Cindy Pardy (2)	?–?				
2010	(Canada) Cindy Pardy (3)	?–?				
2011	(Canada) Robin Curry	?–?				
2012	(Canada) Kim Whaley-Hilts (2)	?–?				
2013	(Canada) Cindy Veith	?–?				
2014	(Canada) Maria Mason (Carli)	?–?				
2015	(Canada) Cindy Hayhurst (Pardy) (4)	?–?				
2016	(Canada) Karrah Boutilier	?–?				
2017	(Canada) Karrah Boutilier (2)	?–?				
2018	(Canada) Maria Mason (Carli) (2)	?–?				
2019	(Canada) Dianne Gobeil	?–?	(Canada) Crystal Chiasson	C$3,400	C$1,000	C$500
2020	No Tournament Due to COVID	N/A				
2021	No Tournament Due to COVID	N/A				
2022	(Canada) Maria Carli (3)	?–?	(Canada) Stefenie Smith	C$3,700	C$900	C$600
2023	(Canada) Brenda Moreau	?–?	(Canada) Wenda Carter	C$4,000	C$2,200	C$600
2024	(Canada) Pam Hall	?–?	(Canada) Vanessa Abela	C$4,000	C$2,200	C$600
2025	(Canada) Maria Carli (4)	5-2	(Canada) Debbie Lewis-Christmas	C$3,600	C$1,200	C$600

== Tournament records ==
- Most wins Men's 5: (England) John Lowe
- Most wins Women's 4: (England) Sharon Colclough, (Canada) Cindy Hayhurst (Pardy), (Canada) Maria Carli (Mason)
- Most finals Men's 6: (England) John Lowe
- Most semi-finals Men's 5: (England) Bob Anderson
- Most quarter-finals Men's 5: (England) Bob Anderson
- Most appearances Men's 7: (Canada) Ken MacNeil, (Canada) Greg Lewis, (Canada) Dion Laviolette, (Canada) Dave Cameron
- Most prize money won (C$4,427): (England) Phil Taylor
- Best winning average:
- Youngest winner (age 20): (Canada) Shaun Narain
- Oldest winner (age 45): (Canada) Carl Mercer

== See also ==
- List of BDO ranked tournaments
- List of WDF tournaments
