= 2010 Championship League Darts =

The 2010 Championship League Darts was the third edition of a darts competition — the Championship League Darts. The competition is organized and held by the Professional Darts Corporation, with the 2010 edition having a maximum prize fund of £189,000.

The format of the tournament is similar to the Premier League Darts tournament, also organized by the PDC, except it is contested by a larger pool of players who are split up into a number of groups.

Every match could be watched on one of the ten bookmaker websites who broadcast the competition. The tournament was available globally through the internet, except in the United States of America where it cannot be shown for legal reasons.

== Format ==
The first group consisted of the top eight players from the PDC Order of Merit who were available for the competition. These eight players played each other over the course of a day, receiving two points for each win. All matches were contested over a maximum of 11 legs with a player winning the match on reaching 6 legs. After all players had played each other, the four players with the most points progressed to the semi-finals with the winners of those matches progressing into the final.

The winner of the final progressed to the winners group which took place at the end of the competition. The runner-up, losing semi-finalists and the players finishing fifth and sixth moved into group two, where they were joined by the next three players in the Order of Merit. The format of the second group was the same as the first group with players moving into the third group. In total there were 8 groups before the final group took place.

This format ensures that all players who do not win the group or finish in the last two positions have another chance to qualify for the winners group.

== Qualification ==
Players must have been in the top 29 places in the PDC Order of Merit following the 2010 World Matchplay in order to qualify. The top 31 places were used due to Mervyn King and Raymond van Barneveld withdrawing from the tournament through injury.

PDC Order of Merit following 2010 World Matchplay:

1. Phil Taylor
2. Raymond van Barneveld
3. James Wade
4. Mervyn King
5. Terry Jenkins
6. Ronnie Baxter
7. Adrian Lewis
8. Simon Whitlock
9. Mark Walsh
10. Colin Lloyd
11. Andy Hamilton
12. Colin Osborne
13. Robert Thornton
14. Dennis Priestley
15. Kevin Painter
16. Alan Tabern
17. Gary Anderson
18. Paul Nicholson
19. Co Stompé
20. Vincent van der Voort
21. Wayne Jones
22. Wes Newton
23. Steve Beaton
24. Denis Ovens
25. Jelle Klaasen
26. Jamie Caven
27. Mark Dudbridge
28. Andy Smith
29. Mark Webster
30. John Part
31. Michael van Gerwen

== Prize money ==
The prize money remained unchanged from the previous two tournaments.

=== Groups 1–8 ===
In groups 1–8 the prize money were as follows:

- Group Matches – £50 per leg won
- Play-off Matches – £100 per leg won

=== Winners group ===
In the winners group the prize money were as follows:

- Group Matches – £100 per leg won
- Play-off Matches – £200 per leg won

In addition the winners group had separate prizes for the winner, runner-up and losing semi-finalists. These prizes broke down as follows:

- Winner – £10,000 and a place in the 2010 Grand Slam of Darts
- Runner-up – £5,000 and a place in the 2010 Grand Slam of Darts
- Losing Semi-finalists – £2,500 each

== Tournament dates ==
The tournament took place over 9 days throughout September and October 2010. One group was played on each day. The dates were as follows:

- Group 1 – Tuesday September 7
- Group 2 – Wednesday September 8
- Group 3 – Thursday September 9
- Group 4 – Tuesday September 21
- Group 5 – Wednesday September 22
- Group 6 – Thursday September 23
- Group 7 – Tuesday October 12
- Group 8 – Wednesday October 13
- Winners Group – Thursday October 14

The tournament took place at the Crondon Park Golf Club in Essex.

Group 1

  - (England) Phil Taylor
  - (England) James Wade
  - (England) Mervyn King
  - (England) Adrian Lewis
  - (Australia) Simon Whitlock
  - (England) Mark Walsh
  - (England) Colin Lloyd
  - (Scotland) Robert Thornton

Group 2

  - (England) James Wade
  - (England) Adrian Lewis
  - (Australia) Simon Whitlock
  - (England) Colin Lloyd
  - (England) Ronnie Baxter
  - (Scotland) Gary Anderson
  - (Australia) Paul Nicholson
  - (Netherlands) Co Stompé *

Group 3

  - (England) James Wade
  - (England) Adrian Lewis
  - (England) Ronnie Baxter
  - (Scotland) Gary Anderson
  - (Netherlands) Co Stompé
  - (England) Andy Hamilton
  - (England) Colin Osborne
  - (England) Alan Tabern

Group 4

  - (England) James Wade
  - (England) Adrian Lewis
  - (Scotland) Gary Anderson
  - (Netherlands) Co Stompé
  - (England) Colin Osborne
  - (England) Terry Jenkins
  - (England) Kevin Painter
  - (England) Dennis Priestley **

Group 5

  - (England) Adrian Lewis
  - (Scotland) Gary Anderson
  - (Netherlands) Co Stompé
  - (England) Kevin Painter
  - (England) Dennis Priestley
  - (Netherlands) Vincent van der Voort
  - (England) Wayne Jones
  - (England) Wes Newton

Group 6

  - (England) Adrian Lewis
  - (Netherlands) Co Stompé
  - (England) Dennis Priestley
  - (Netherlands) Vincent van der Voort
  - (England) Wayne Jones
  - (England) Steve Beaton
  - (Netherlands) Jelle Klaasen
  - (England) Jamie Caven

Group 7

  - (Netherlands) Co Stompé
  - (England) Dennis Priestley
  - (Netherlands) Vincent van der Voort
  - (England) Wayne Jones
  - (Netherlands) Jelle Klaasen
  - (England) Denis Ovens
  - (England) Mark Dudbridge
  - (England) Andy Smith

Group 8

  - (Netherlands) Co Stompé
  - (England) Dennis Priestley
  - (England) Wayne Jones
  - (Netherlands) Jelle Klaasen
  - (England) Denis Ovens
  - (Wales) Mark Webster
  - (Canada) John Part
  - (Netherlands) Michael van Gerwen

Winners Group

  - (England) Phil Taylor
  - (Australia) Simon Whitlock
  - (England) Alan Tabern
  - (England) James Wade
  - (England) Wes Newton
  - (England) Steve Beaton
  - (England) Andy Smith
  - (England) Wayne Jones

- * Mervyn King withdrew from the tournament after Group 1 due to injury, with Co Stompé taking his place in Group 2.
- ** Raymond van Barneveld was due to play in Group 4 but withdrew due to injury, with Dennis Priestley taking his place in the group.

== Group one ==
Played on Tuesday September 7.

Pos	Name	P	W	L	LW	LL	+/-	Pts
1	(England) Mervyn King	7	6	1	39	27	+12	12
2	(England) Phil Taylor	7	5	2	38	25	+13	10
3	(Australia) Simon Whitlock	7	5	2	35	23	+12	10
4	(England) Colin Lloyd	7	4	3	30	30	0	8
5	(England) Adrian Lewis	7	3	4	29	33	−4	6
6	(England) James Wade	7	3	4	29	35	−6	6
7	(England) Mark Walsh	7	1	6	28	37	−9	2
8	(Scotland) Robert Thornton	7	1	6	22	40	−18	2

Board 1

Board 2

=== Group Results ===
Player	Legs	Player
Phil Taylor (England)	6 – 2	(England) James Wade
Simon Whitlock (Australia)	6 – 1	(England) Mark Walsh

Player	Legs	Player
Colin Lloyd (England)	6 – 4	(Scotland) Robert Thornton
Mervyn King (England)	6 – 5	(England) Adrian Lewis

Player	Legs	Player
Robert Thornton (Scotland)	6 – 4	(England) Phil Taylor
Adrian Lewis (England)	6 – 3	(Australia) Simon Whitlock

Player	Legs	Player
Mark Walsh (England)	3 – 6	(England) Mervyn King
James Wade (England)	5 – 6	(England) Colin Lloyd

Player	Legs	Player
Robert Thornton (Scotland)	2 – 6	(England) Mervyn King
Adrian Lewis (England)	0 – 6	(England) Colin Lloyd

Player	Legs	Player
Phil Taylor (England)	6 – 5	(England) Mark Walsh
James Wade (England)	0 – 6	(Australia) Simon Whitlock

Player	Legs	Player
Mervyn King (England)	6 – 4	(England) Phil Taylor
James Wade (England)	6 – 3	(England) Adrian Lewis

Player	Legs	Player
Robert Thornton (Scotland)	1 – 6	(England) Mark Walsh
Colin Lloyd (England)	2 – 6	(Australia) Simon Whitlock

Player	Legs	Player
Colin Lloyd (England)	3 – 6	(England) Mervyn King
Mark Walsh (England)	5 – 6	(England) James Wade

Player	Legs	Player
Simon Whitlock (Australia)	2 – 6	(England) Phil Taylor
Adrian Lewis (England)	6 – 1	(Scotland) Robert Thornton

Player	Legs	Player
Simon Whitlock (Australia)	6 – 5	(Scotland) Robert Thornton
Mark Walsh (England)	3 – 6	(England) Colin Lloyd

Player	Legs	Player
James Wade (England)	4 – 6	(England) Mervyn King
Phil Taylor (England)	6 – 3	(England) Adrian Lewis

Player	Legs	Player
Colin Lloyd (England)	1 – 6	(England) Phil Taylor
Adrian Lewis (England)	6 – 5	(England) Mark Walsh

Player	Legs	Player
Mervyn King (England)	3 – 6	(Australia) Simon Whitlock
Robert Thornton (Scotland)	3 – 6	(England) James Wade

=== Play-Offs ===
==== Semi-finals ====
Player	Legs	Player
Mervyn King (England)	2 – 6	(England) Colin Lloyd

Player	Legs	Player
Phil Taylor (England)	6 – 1	(Australia) Simon Whitlock

==== Final ====
Player	Legs	Player
Colin Lloyd (England)	2 – 6	(England) Phil Taylor

== Group two ==
Played on Wednesday September 8.

Pos	Name	P	W	L	LW	LL	+/-	Pts
1	(Scotland) Gary Anderson	7	5	2	36	19	+17	10
2	(Australia) Simon Whitlock	7	5	2	38	26	+12	10
3	(England) Adrian Lewis	7	5	2	37	31	+6	10
4	(England) Ronnie Baxter	7	4	3	30	27	+3	8
5	(England) James Wade	7	4	3	31	37	−6	8
6	(Netherlands) Co Stompé	7	3	4	26	30	−4	6
7	(Australia) Paul Nicholson	7	2	5	32	36	−4	4
8	(England) Colin Lloyd	7	0	7	18	42	−24	0

Board 1

Board 2

=== Group Results ===
Player	Legs	Player
James Wade (England)	6 – 5	(Netherlands) Co Stompé
Simon Whitlock (Australia)	6 – 1	(England) Colin Lloyd

Player	Legs	Player
Gary Anderson (Scotland)	2 – 6	(Australia) Paul Nicholson
Adrian Lewis (England)	6 – 2	(England) Ronnie Baxter

Player	Legs	Player
Paul Nicholson (Australia)	4 – 6	(England) James Wade
Ronnie Baxter (England)	3 – 6	(Australia) Simon Whitlock

Player	Legs	Player
Colin Lloyd (England)	5 – 6	(England) Adrian Lewis
Co Stompé (Netherlands)	0 – 6	(Scotland) Gary Anderson

Player	Legs	Player
Paul Nicholson (Australia)	5 – 6	(England) Adrian Lewis
Ronnie Baxter (England)	1 – 6	(Scotland) Gary Anderson

Player	Legs	Player
James Wade (England)	6 – 5	(England) Colin Lloyd
Co Stompé (Netherlands)	3 – 6	(Australia) Simon Whitlock

Player	Legs	Player
Adrian Lewis (England)	5 – 6	(England) James Wade
Co Stompé (Netherlands)	0 – 6	(England) Ronnie Baxter

Player	Legs	Player
Paul Nicholson (Australia)	6 – 4	(England) Colin Lloyd
Gary Anderson (Scotland)	6 – 5	(Australia) Simon Whitlock

Player	Legs	Player
Gary Anderson (Scotland)	4 – 6	(England) Adrian Lewis
Colin Lloyd (England)	1 – 6	(Netherlands) Co Stompé

Player	Legs	Player
Simon Whitlock (Australia)	6 – 3	(England) James Wade
Ronnie Baxter (England)	6 – 4	(Australia) Paul Nicholson

Player	Legs	Player
Simon Whitlock (Australia)	6 – 4	(Australia) Paul Nicholson
Colin Lloyd (England)	1 – 6	(Scotland) Gary Anderson

Player	Legs	Player
Co Stompé (Netherlands)	6 – 2	(England) Adrian Lewis
James Wade (England)	4 – 6	(England) Ronnie Baxter

Player	Legs	Player
Gary Anderson (Scotland)	6 – 0	(England) James Wade
Ronnie Baxter (England)	6 – 1	(England) Colin Lloyd

Player	Legs	Player
Adrian Lewis (England)	6 – 3	(Australia) Simon Whitlock
Paul Nicholson (Australia)	3 – 6	(Netherlands) Co Stompé

=== Play-Offs ===
==== Semi-finals ====
Player	Legs	Player
Gary Anderson (Scotland)	6 – 2	(England) Ronnie Baxter

Player	Legs	Player
Simon Whitlock (Australia)	6 – 2	(England) Adrian Lewis

==== Final ====
Player	Legs	Player
Gary Anderson (Scotland)	2 – 6	(Australia) Simon Whitlock

== Group three ==
Played on Thursday September 9.

Pos	Name	P	W	L	LW	LL	+/-	Pts
1	(England) Alan Tabern	7	6	1	40	28	+12	12
2	(Scotland) Gary Anderson	7	4	3	32	26	+6	8
3	(England) Colin Osborne	7	4	3	36	33	+3	8
4	(England) James Wade	7	4	3	34	33	+1	8
5	(England) Adrian Lewis	7	4	3	30	29	+1	8
6	(Netherlands) Co Stompé	7	3	4	35	35	0	6
7	(England) Ronnie Baxter	7	2	5	29	37	−8	4
8	(England) Andy Hamilton	7	1	6	22	37	−15	2

Board 1

Board 2

=== Group Results ===
Player	Legs	Player
James Wade (England)	6 – 2	(England) Adrian Lewis
Colin Osborne (England)	3 – 6	(Scotland) Gary Anderson

Player	Legs	Player
Co Stompé (Netherlands)	5 – 6	(England) Alan Tabern
Ronnie Baxter (England)	6 – 2	(England) Andy Hamilton

Player	Legs	Player
Alan Tabern (England)	6 – 4	(England) James Wade
Andy Hamilton (England)	3 – 6	(England) Colin Osborne

Player	Legs	Player
Gary Anderson (Scotland)	6 – 2	(England) Ronnie Baxter
Adrian Lewis (England)	6 – 2	(Netherlands) Co Stompé

Player	Legs	Player
Alan Tabern (England)	6 – 4	(England) Ronnie Baxter
Andy Hamilton (England)	3 – 6	(Netherlands) Co Stompé

Player	Legs	Player
James Wade (England)	1 – 6	(Scotland) Gary Anderson
Adrian Lewis (England)	6 – 4	(England) Colin Osborne

Player	Legs	Player
Ronnie Baxter (England)	6 – 5	(England) James Wade
Adrian Lewis (England)	1 – 6	(England) Andy Hamilton

Player	Legs	Player
Alan Tabern (England)	6 – 3	(Scotland) Gary Anderson
Co Stompé (Netherlands)	5 – 6	(England) Colin Osborne

Player	Legs	Player
Co Stompé (Netherlands)	6 – 4	(England) Ronnie Baxter
Gary Anderson (Scotland)	1 – 6	(England) Adrian Lewis

Player	Legs	Player
Colin Osborne (England)	5 – 6	(England) James Wade
Andy Hamilton (England)	3 – 6	(England) Alan Tabern

Player	Legs	Player
Colin Osborne (England)	6 – 4	(England) Alan Tabern
Gary Anderson (Scotland)	4 – 6	(Netherlands) Co Stompé

Player	Legs	Player
Adrian Lewis (England)	6 – 4	(England) Ronnie Baxter
James Wade (England)	6 – 3	(England) Andy Hamilton

Player	Legs	Player
Co Stompé (Netherlands)	5 – 6	(England) James Wade
Andy Hamilton (England)	2 – 6	(Scotland) Gary Anderson

Player	Legs	Player
Ronnie Baxter (England)	3 – 6	(England) Colin Osborne
Alan Tabern (England)	6 – 3	(England) Adrian Lewis

=== Play-Offs ===
==== Semi-finals ====
Player	Legs	Player
Alan Tabern (England)	6 – 2	(England) James Wade

Player	Legs	Player
Gary Anderson (Scotland)	6 – 4	(England) Colin Osborne

==== Final ====
Player	Legs	Player
Alan Tabern (England)	6 – 5	(Scotland) Gary Anderson

== Group four ==
Played on Tuesday September 21.

Pos	Name	P	W	L	LW	LL	+/-	Pts
1	(England) Adrian Lewis	7	6	1	41	26	+15	12
2	(Netherlands) Co Stompé	7	5	2	36	30	+6	10
3	(England) Dennis Priestley	7	5	2	34	29	+5	10
4	(England) James Wade	7	4	3	32	29	+3	8
5	(Scotland) Gary Anderson	7	3	4	31	32	−1	6
6	(England) Kevin Painter	7	3	4	31	36	−5	6
7	(England) Colin Osborne	7	2	5	31	40	−9	4
8	(England) Terry Jenkins	7	0	7	28	42	−14	0

Board 1

Board 2

=== Group Results ===
Player	Legs	Player
Dennis Priestley (England)	2 – 6	(England) James Wade
Colin Osborne (England)	3 – 6	(Scotland) Gary Anderson

Player	Legs	Player
Kevin Painter (England)	3 – 6	(Netherlands) Co Stompé
Terry Jenkins (England)	5 – 6	(England) Adrian Lewis

Player	Legs	Player
Co Stompé (Netherlands)	4 – 6	(England) Dennis Priestley
Adrian Lewis (England)	5 – 6	(England) Colin Osborne

Player	Legs	Player
Gary Anderson (Scotland)	6 – 3	(England) Terry Jenkins
James Wade (England)	2 – 6	(England) Kevin Painter

Player	Legs	Player
Co Stompé (Netherlands)	6 – 4	(England) Terry Jenkins
Adrian Lewis (England)	6 – 5	(England) Kevin Painter

Player	Legs	Player
Dennis Priestley (England)	6 – 2	(Scotland) Gary Anderson
James Wade (England)	6 – 1	(England) Colin Osborne

Player	Legs	Player
Terry Jenkins (England)	3 – 6	(England) Dennis Priestley
James Wade (England)	3 – 6	(England) Adrian Lewis

Player	Legs	Player
Co Stompé (Netherlands)	6 – 3	(Scotland) Gary Anderson
Kevin Painter (England)	6 – 5	(England) Colin Osborne

Player	Legs	Player
Kevin Painter (England)	6 – 5	(England) Terry Jenkins
Gary Anderson (Scotland)	5 – 6	(England) James Wade

Player	Legs	Player
Colin Osborne (England)	5 – 6	(England) Dennis Priestley
Adrian Lewis (England)	6 – 2	(Netherlands) Co Stompé

Player	Legs	Player
Colin Osborne (England)	5 – 6	(Netherlands) Co Stompé
Gary Anderson (Scotland)	6 – 2	(England) Kevin Painter

Player	Legs	Player
James Wade (England)	6 – 3	(England) Terry Jenkins
Dennis Priestley (England)	2 – 6	(England) Adrian Lewis

Player	Legs	Player
Kevin Painter (England)	3 – 6	(England) Dennis Priestley
Adrian Lewis (England)	6 – 3	(Scotland) Gary Anderson

Player	Legs	Player
Terry Jenkins (England)	5 – 6	(England) Colin Osborne
Co Stompé (Netherlands)	6 – 3	(England) James Wade

=== Play-Offs ===
==== Semi-finals ====
Player	Legs	Player
Adrian Lewis (England)	4 – 6	(England) James Wade

Player	Legs	Player
Co Stompé (Netherlands)	5 – 6	(England) Dennis Priestley

==== Final ====
Player	Legs	Player
James Wade (England)	6 – 5	(England) Dennis Priestley

== Group Five ==
Played on Wednesday September 22.

Pos	Name	P	W	L	LW	LL	+/-	Pts
1	(England) Adrian Lewis	7	5	2	34	30	+4	10
2	(England) Wayne Jones	7	4	3	34	29	+5	8
3	(Netherlands) Co Stompé	7	4	3	34	32	+2	8
4	(England) Wes Newton	7	4	3	35	35	0	8
5	(England) Dennis Priestley	7	4	3	36	37	−1	8
6	(Netherlands) Vincent van der Voort	7	3	4	33	30	+3	6
7	(Scotland) Gary Anderson	7	3	4	32	33	−1	6
8	(England) Kevin Painter	7	1	6	27	39	−12	2

Board 1

Board 2

=== Group Results ===
Player	Legs	Player
Adrian Lewis (England)	6 – 4	(Scotland) Gary Anderson
Dennis Priestley (England)	6 – 5	(Netherlands) Vincent van der Voort

Player	Legs	Player
Wayne Jones (England)	6 – 2	(England) Wes Newton
Kevin Painter (England)	6 – 3	(Netherlands) Co Stompé

Player	Legs	Player
Wes Newton (England)	6 – 4	(England) Adrian Lewis
Co Stompé (Netherlands)	6 – 5	(England) Dennis Priestley

Player	Legs	Player
Vincent van der Voort (Netherlands)	6 – 3	(England) Kevin Painter
Gary Anderson (Scotland)	1 – 6	(England) Wayne Jones

Player	Legs	Player
Wes Newton (England)	6 – 3	(England) Kevin Painter
Co Stompé (Netherlands)	6 – 4	(England) Wayne Jones

Player	Legs	Player
Adrian Lewis (England)	6 – 3	(Netherlands) Vincent van der Voort
Gary Anderson (Scotland)	4 – 6	(England) Dennis Priestley

Player	Legs	Player
Kevin Painter (England)	4 – 6	(England) Adrian Lewis
Gary Anderson (Scotland)	5 – 6	(Netherlands) Co Stompé

Player	Legs	Player
Wes Newton (England)	6 – 5	(Netherlands) Vincent van der Voort
Wayne Jones (England)	6 – 5	(England) Dennis Priestley

Player	Legs	Player
Wayne Jones (England)	6 – 3	(England) Kevin Painter
Vincent van der Voort (Netherlands)	2 – 6	(Scotland) Gary Anderson

Player	Legs	Player
Dennis Priestley (England)	2 – 6	(England) Adrian Lewis
Co Stompé (Netherlands)	5 – 6	(England) Wes Newton

Player	Legs	Player
Dennis Priestley (England)	6 – 5	(England) Wes Newton
Vincent van der Voort (Netherlands)	6 – 1	(England) Wayne Jones

Player	Legs	Player
Gary Anderson (Scotland)	6 – 3	(England) Kevin Painter
Adrian Lewis (England)	0 – 6	(Netherlands) Co Stompé

Player	Legs	Player
Wayne Jones (England)	5 – 6	(England) Adrian Lewis
Co Stompé (Netherlands)	2 – 6	(Netherlands) Vincent van der Voort

Player	Legs	Player
Kevin Painter (England)	5 – 6	(England) Dennis Priestley
Wes Newton (England)	4 – 6	(Scotland) Gary Anderson

=== Play-Offs ===
==== Semi-finals ====
Player	Legs	Player
Adrian Lewis (England)	1 – 6	(England) Wes Newton

Player	Legs	Player
Wayne Jones (England)	3 – 6	(Netherlands) Co Stompé

==== Final ====
Player	Legs	Player
Wes Newton (England)	6 – 1	(Netherlands) Co Stompé

== Group Six ==
Played on Thursday September 23.

Pos	Name	P	W	L	LW	LL	+/-	Pts
1	(Netherlands) Vincent van der Voort	7	5	2	34	27	+7	10
2	(England) Steve Beaton	7	5	2	35	33	+2	10
3	(England) Wayne Jones	7	4	3	37	32	+5	8
4	(Netherlands) Co Stompé	7	4	3	34	30	+4	8
5	(Netherlands) Jelle Klaasen	7	3	4	32	29	+3	6
6	(England) Dennis Priestley	7	3	4	28	29	−1	6
7	(England) Jamie Caven	7	3	4	29	31	−2	6
8	(England) Adrian Lewis	7	1	6	21	39	−18	2

Board 1

Board 2

=== Group Results ===
Player	Legs	Player
Adrian Lewis (England)	4 – 6	(Netherlands) Co Stompé
Wayne Jones (England)	5 – 6	(England) Steve Beaton

Player	Legs	Player
Jelle Klaasen (Netherlands)	6 – 2	(England) Jamie Caven
Dennis Priestley (England)	6 – 0	(Netherlands) Vincent van der Voort

Player	Legs	Player
Jamie Caven (England)	3 – 6	(England) Adrian Lewis
Vincent van der Voort (Netherlands)	6 – 3	(England) Wayne Jones

Player	Legs	Player
Steve Beaton (England)	6 – 4	(England) Dennis Priestley
Co Stompé (Netherlands)	6 – 3	(Netherlands) Jelle Klaasen

Player	Legs	Player
Jamie Caven (England)	3 – 6	(England) Dennis Priestley
Vincent van der Voort (Netherlands)	6 – 5	(Netherlands) Jelle Klaasen

Player	Legs	Player
Adrian Lewis (England)	4 – 6	(England) Steve Beaton
Co Stompé (Netherlands)	4 – 6	(England) Wayne Jones

Player	Legs	Player
Dennis Priestley (England)	6 – 2	(England) Adrian Lewis
Co Stompé (Netherlands)	6 – 4	(Netherlands) Vincent van der Voort

Player	Legs	Player
Jamie Caven (England)	6 – 1	(England) Steve Beaton
Jelle Klaasen (Netherlands)	3 – 6	(England) Wayne Jones

Player	Legs	Player
Jelle Klaasen (Netherlands)	6 – 3	(England) Dennis Priestley
Steve Beaton (England)	6 – 5	(Netherlands) Co Stompé

Player	Legs	Player
Wayne Jones (England)	6 – 5	(England) Adrian Lewis
Vincent van der Voort (Netherlands)	6 – 3	(England) Jamie Caven

Player	Legs	Player
Wayne Jones (England)	5 – 6	(England) Jamie Caven
Steve Beaton (England)	6 – 3	(Netherlands) Jelle Klaasen

Player	Legs	Player
Co Stompé (Netherlands)	6 – 1	(England) Dennis Priestley
Adrian Lewis (England)	0 – 6	(Netherlands) Vincent van der Voort

Player	Legs	Player
Jelle Klaasen (Netherlands)	6 – 0	(England) Adrian Lewis
Vincent van der Voort (Netherlands)	6 – 4	(England) Steve Beaton

Player	Legs	Player
Dennis Priestley (England)	2 – 6	(England) Wayne Jones
Jamie Caven (England)	6 – 1	(Netherlands) Co Stompé

=== Play-Offs ===
==== Semi-finals ====
Player	Legs	Player
Vincent van der Voort (Netherlands)	6 – 3	(Netherlands) Co Stompé

Player	Legs	Player
Steve Beaton (England)	6 – 3	(England) Wayne Jones

==== Final ====
Player	Legs	Player
Vincent van der Voort (Netherlands)	3 – 6	(England) Steve Beaton

== Group Seven ==
Played on Tuesday October 12.

Pos	Name	P	W	L	LW	LL	+/-	Pts
1	(Netherlands) Jelle Klaasen	7	5	2	36	28	+8	10
2	(England) Denis Ovens	7	5	2	36	30	+6	10
3	(England) Andy Smith	7	4	3	38	30	+8	8
4	(Netherlands) Co Stompé	7	4	3	38	34	+4	8
5	(England) Wayne Jones	7	3	4	32	32	0	6
6	(England) Dennis Priestley	7	3	4	29	30	−1	6
7	(Netherlands) Vincent van der Voort	7	3	4	33	36	−3	6
8	(England) Mark Dudbridge	7	1	6	19	41	−22	2

Board 1

Board 2

=== Group Results ===
Player	Legs	Player
Co Stompé (Netherlands)	6 – 3	(England) Dennis Priestley
Denis Ovens (England)	6 – 5	(Netherlands) Jelle Klaasen

Player	Legs	Player
Mark Dudbridge (England)	5 – 6	(England) Andy Smith
Vincent van der Voort (Netherlands)	6 – 3	(England) Wayne Jones

Player	Legs	Player
Andy Smith (England)	6 – 5	(Netherlands) Co Stompé
Wayne Jones (England)	4 – 6	(England) Denis Ovens

Player	Legs	Player
Jelle Klaasen (Netherlands)	6 – 5	(Netherlands) Vincent van der Voort
Dennis Priestley (England)	6 – 1	(England) Mark Dudbridge

Player	Legs	Player
Andy Smith (England)	4 – 6	(Netherlands) Vincent van der Voort
Wayne Jones (England)	6 – 0	(England) Mark Dudbridge

Player	Legs	Player
Co Stompé (Netherlands)	4 – 6	(Netherlands) Jelle Klaasen
Dennis Priestley (England)	1 – 6	(England) Denis Ovens

Player	Legs	Player
Vincent van der Voort (Netherlands)	5 – 6	(Netherlands) Co Stompé
Dennis Priestley (England)	3 – 6	(England) Wayne Jones

Player	Legs	Player
Andy Smith (England)	6 – 1	(Netherlands) Jelle Klaasen
Mark Dudbridge (England)	3 – 6	(England) Denis Ovens

Player	Legs	Player
Mark Dudbridge (England)	6 – 5	(Netherlands) Vincent van der Voort
Jelle Klaasen (Netherlands)	6 – 4	(England) Dennis Priestley

Player	Legs	Player
Denis Ovens (England)	6 – 5	(Netherlands) Co Stompé
Wayne Jones (England)	6 – 5	(England) Andy Smith

Player	Legs	Player
Denis Ovens (England)	1 – 6	(England) Andy Smith
Jelle Klaasen (Netherlands)	6 – 0	(England) Mark Dudbridge

Player	Legs	Player
Dennis Priestley (England)	6 – 0	(Netherlands) Vincent van der Voort
Co Stompé (Netherlands)	6 – 4	(England) Wayne Jones

Player	Legs	Player
Mark Dudbridge (England)	4 – 6	(Netherlands) Co Stompé
Wayne Jones (England)	3 – 6	(Netherlands) Jelle Klaasen

Player	Legs	Player
Vincent van der Voort (Netherlands)	6 – 5	(England) Denis Ovens
Andy Smith (England)	5 – 6	(England) Dennis Priestley

=== Play-Offs ===
==== Semi-finals ====
Player	Legs	Player
Jelle Klaasen (Netherlands)	6 – 2	(Netherlands) Co Stompé

Player	Legs	Player
Denis Ovens (England)	5 – 6	(England) Andy Smith

==== Final ====
Player	Legs	Player
Jelle Klaasen (Netherlands)	5 – 6	(England) Andy Smith

== Group Eight ==
Played on Wednesday October 13.

Pos	Name	P	W	L	LW	LL	+/-	Pts
1	(Netherlands) Co Stompé	7	6	1	41	31	+10	12
2	(England) Wayne Jones	7	5	2	40	29	+11	10
3	(England) Dennis Priestley	7	5	2	37	32	+5	10
4	(Wales) Mark Webster	7	4	3	34	29	+5	8
5	(Netherlands) Michael van Gerwen	7	3	4	32	33	−1	6
6	(Canada) John Part	7	3	4	32	34	−2	6
7	(Netherlands) Jelle Klaasen	7	2	5	31	35	−4	4
8	(England) Denis Ovens	7	0	7	18	42	−24	0

Board 1

Board 2

=== Group Results ===
Player	Legs	Player
Co Stompé (Netherlands)	5 – 6	(England) Dennis Priestley
Jelle Klaasen (Netherlands)	4 – 6	(Wales) Mark Webster

Player	Legs	Player
John Part (Canada)	2 – 6	(Netherlands) Michael van Gerwen
Wayne Jones (England)	6 – 2	(England) Denis Ovens

Player	Legs	Player
Michael van Gerwen (Netherlands)	4 – 6	(Netherlands) Co Stompé
Denis Ovens (England)	2 – 6	(Netherlands) Jelle Klaasen

Player	Legs	Player
Mark Webster (Wales)	4 – 6	(England) Wayne Jones
Dennis Priestley (England)	6 – 3	(Canada) John Part

Player	Legs	Player
Michael van Gerwen (Netherlands)	4 – 6	(England) Wayne Jones
Denis Ovens (England)	1 – 6	(Canada) John Part

Player	Legs	Player
Co Stompé (Netherlands)	6 – 2	(Wales) Mark Webster
Dennis Priestley (England)	6 – 3	(Netherlands) Jelle Klaasen

Player	Legs	Player
Wayne Jones (England)	5 – 6	(Netherlands) Co Stompé
Dennis Priestley (England)	6 – 4	(England) Denis Ovens

Player	Legs	Player
Michael van Gerwen (Netherlands)	3 – 6	(Wales) Mark Webster
John Part (Canada)	6 – 5	(Netherlands) Jelle Klaasen

Player	Legs	Player
John Part (Canada)	4 – 6	(England) Wayne Jones
Mark Webster (Wales)	6 – 3	(England) Dennis Priestley

Player	Legs	Player
Jelle Klaasen (Netherlands)	4 – 6	(Netherlands) Co Stompé
Denis Ovens (England)	3 – 6	(Netherlands) Michael van Gerwen

Player	Legs	Player
Jelle Klaasen (Netherlands)	6 – 3	(Netherlands) Michael van Gerwen
Mark Webster (Wales)	4 – 6	(Canada) John Part

Player	Legs	Player
Dennis Priestley (England)	6 – 5	(England) Wayne Jones
Co Stompé (Netherlands)	6 – 5	(England) Denis Ovens

Player	Legs	Player
John Part (Canada)	5 – 6	(Netherlands) Co Stompé
Denis Ovens (England)	1 – 6	(Wales) Mark Webster

Player	Legs	Player
Wayne Jones (England)	6 – 3	(Netherlands) Jelle Klaasen
Michael van Gerwen (Netherlands)	6 – 4	(England) Dennis Priestley

=== Play-Offs ===
==== Semi-finals ====
Player	Legs	Player
Co Stompé (Netherlands)	3 – 6	(Wales) Mark Webster

Player	Legs	Player
Wayne Jones (England)	6 – 2	(England) Dennis Priestley

==== Final ====
Player	Legs	Player
Mark Webster (Wales)	2 – 6	(England) Wayne Jones

== Winners Group ==
Played on Thursday October 14.

Pos	Name	P	W	L	LW	LL	+/-	Pts
1	(England) Phil Taylor	7	7	0	42	12	+30	14
2	(England) James Wade	7	5	2	36	24	+12	10
3	(Australia) Simon Whitlock	7	4	3	32	23	+9	8
4	(England) Steve Beaton	7	3	4	32	31	+1	6
5	(England) Alan Tabern	7	3	4	27	35	−8	6
6	(England) Wayne Jones	7	3	4	23	35	−12	6
7	(England) Wes Newton	7	2	5	22	39	−17	4
8	(England) Andy Smith	7	1	6	22	37	−15	2

Board 1

Board 2

=== Group Results ===
Player	Legs	Player
Phil Taylor (England)	6 – 1	(Australia) Simon Whitlock
Wes Newton (England)	6 – 4	(England) Steve Beaton

Player	Legs	Player
Andy Smith (England)	4 – 6	(England) Wayne Jones
Alan Tabern (England)	4 – 6	(England) James Wade

Player	Legs	Player
Wayne Jones (England)	3 – 6	(England) Phil Taylor
James Wade (England)	5 – 6	(England) Wes Newton

Player	Legs	Player
Steve Beaton (England)	4 – 6	(England) Alan Tabern
Simon Whitlock (Australia)	6 – 2	(England) Andy Smith

Player	Legs	Player
Wayne Jones (England)	6 – 2	(England) Alan Tabern
James Wade (England)	6 – 3	(England) Andy Smith

Player	Legs	Player
Phil Taylor (England)	6 – 4	(England) Steve Beaton
Simon Whitlock (Australia)	6 – 1	(England) Wes Newton

Player	Legs	Player
Alan Tabern (England)	1 – 6	(England) Phil Taylor
Simon Whitlock (Australia)	2 – 6	(England) James Wade

Player	Legs	Player
Wayne Jones (England)	1 – 6	(England) Steve Beaton
Andy Smith (England)	6 – 1	(England) Wes Newton

Player	Legs	Player
Andy Smith (England)	4 – 6	(England) Alan Tabern
Steve Beaton (England)	6 – 5	(Australia) Simon Whitlock

Player	Legs	Player
Wes Newton (England)	0 – 6	(England) Phil Taylor
James Wade (England)	6 – 1	(England) Wayne Jones

Player	Legs	Player
Wes Newton (England)	5 – 6	(England) Wayne Jones
Steve Beaton (England)	6 – 1	(England) Andy Smith

Player	Legs	Player
Simon Whitlock (Australia)	6 – 2	(England) Alan Tabern
Phil Taylor (England)	6 – 1	(England) James Wade

Player	Legs	Player
Andy Smith (England)	2 – 6	(England) Phil Taylor
James Wade (England)	6 – 2	(England) Steve Beaton

Player	Legs	Player
Alan Tabern (England)	6 – 3	(England) Wes Newton
Wayne Jones (England)	0 – 6	(Australia) Simon Whitlock

=== Play-Offs ===
==== Semi-finals ====
Player	Legs	Player
(1) Phil Taylor (England)	6 – 0	(England) Steve Beaton (4)

Player	Legs	Player
(2) James Wade (England)	6 – 2	(Australia) Simon Whitlock (3)

==== Final ====
Player	Legs	Player
(2) James Wade (England)	6–5	(England) Phil Taylor (1)
