= Mark Webster (darts player) =

Welsh darts player (born 1983)

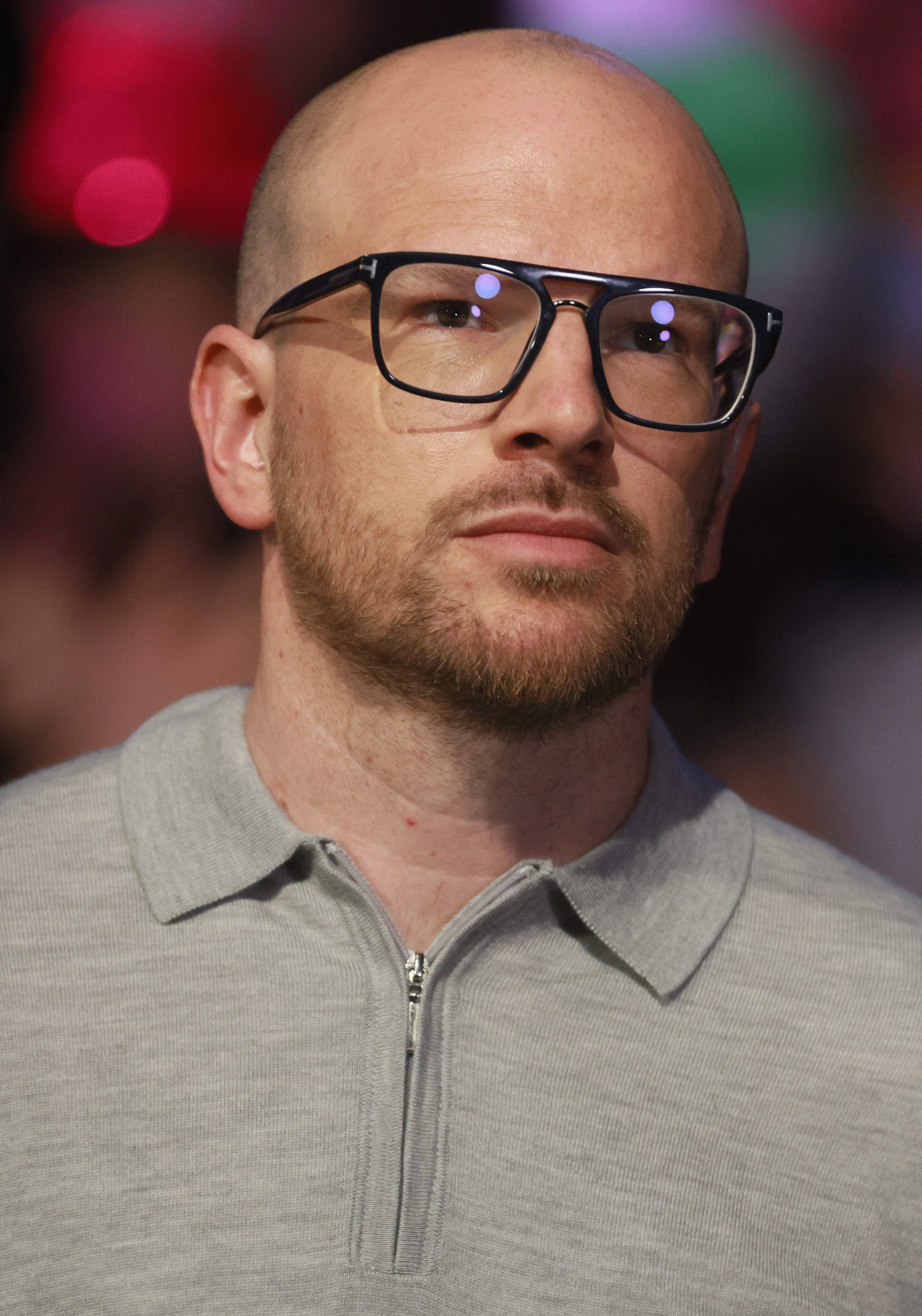
- Webster in 2025

Personal information
- Nicknames: "Webby" "The Spider"
- Born: 12 August 1983 (age 43) St Asaph, Denbighshire, Wales
- Home town: Denbigh, Wales

Sport
- Sport: Darts
- Playing since: 2000
- Darts: 23g Winmau Signature
- Laterality: Left-handed
- Walk-on music: "Jump" by Van Halen

Organisation (see split in darts)
- BDO: 2005–2009
- PDC: 2009–2019 (Tour Card: 2011–2019)

WDF major events – best performances
- World Championship: Winner (1): 2008
- World Masters: Semi-final: 2006
- World Trophy: Quarter-final: 2007
- Int. Darts League: Runner-up: 2007
- Finder Masters: Runner-up: 2007

PDC premier events – best performances
- World Championship: Semi-final: 2010 (3rd), 2011
- World Matchplay: Quarter-final: 2011
- World Grand Prix: Semi-final: 2015
- UK Open: Semi-final: 2011
- Grand Slam: Quarter-final: 2008, 2011, 2015
- European Championship: Last 32: 2011, 2012, 2013
- Premier League: 8th: 2011
- PC Finals: Runner-up: 2011

Other tournament wins
- Years
Canadian Open	2007
Northern Ireland Open	2006
Portland Open	2011
Welsh Classic	2007
Welsh Open	2007
Players Championships (x1)
2010

Mark Webster (born 12 August 1983) is a Welsh former professional darts player. Nicknamed Webby and the Spider, he competed in British Darts Organisation (BDO) and Professional Darts Corporation (PDC) events. Webster won the BDO World Championship in 2008. He switched from the BDO to the PDC and became a full-time professional in 2009, having previously been a fully qualified registered plumber. He now works as an analyst and commentator on Sky Sports and ITV.

== Darts career ==
Webster made progress once he was aged 12 and could play in Local Darts Leagues in public houses in his native North Wales. He started playing for the local "Golden Lion" team like both of his parents, and still plays regularly for his pub team "The Masons".

He first came to prominence in 2006, winning the 2006 WDF Europe Cup, and making the semi-finals of the 2006 Winmau World Masters. In other BDO/WDF tournaments during 2006, he won the Northern Ireland Open and reached the semi-finals of the Welsh Open. However, he underperformed in the subsequent 2007 World Championship, losing on his debut to Tony Eccles 3–0 in the first round.

In May 2007, he beat Phil Taylor in the group stages on his way to the final of the International Darts League, then lost 9–13 to Gary Anderson. He added to his growing collection of titles by winning the World Cup Singles in October 2007.

Despite his lack of major television tournament wins, Webster entered the 2008 BDO World Championship as the number one seed due to his success in open events. This time around, Webster justified his status as joint-favourite for the title (alongside Anderson), as he beat Ian Jones in the first round, popular qualifier Glenn Moody in the last 16 and ninth seed Darryl Fitton in the quarter-finals. He played defending champion Martin Adams in the semi-finals, beating him 6–4 and earning a place in the final. He then beat Simon Whitlock 7–5 in the final on 13 January 2008, to become the third Welshman to win the World Championship of either organisation, after Leighton Rees and Richie Burnett, and only the second left-handed player to win the World Championship in either the PDC or BDO.

Webster did not play many tournaments in 2008, instead choosing to remain in college to earn his plumbing degree. He did though retain the WDF Europe Cup, beating Northern Ireland's Daryl Gurney in the final. Webster also had a great run into the quarter finals of the 2008 Grand Slam of Darts. After surprisingly losing his opening group game to Colin McGarry, he went on to whitewash Michael van Gerwen 5–0, and despite losing to Mervyn King, Webster went through to the knockout stages on leg difference after McGarry failed to beat van Gerwen. Webster then demolished PDC World Champion John Part 10–2 – in a battle of the incumbent world champions, – to reach the quarter finals where he lost again to King. Webster then suffered a last 16 exit in the 2008 World Masters, losing to Ross Montgomery, and then went out in the group stages of the Zuiderduin Masters. Having beaten Martin Atkins, he lost to wildcard entrant Henny van der Ster who claimed the quarter final spot ahead of Webster and went on to reach the semi-finals.

Webster entered the 2009 BDO World Championship as the number two seed. He defeated Dutchman Willy van de Wiel 3–0 in the first round but his title reign came to an end in the second round when he was beaten 4–0 by 2001 Lakeside Champion John Walton.

== PDC career ==
=== 2009–2010 ===
With rumours persisting over a potential switch to the PDC, Webster had remained defiant that he would return to Lakeside in 2010. However, it was announced on 5 February 2009 that Webster had joined the PDC, making his debut at the double-header Players Championship events in Gladbeck at the end of February.

In his PDC debut he did not manage to earn any prize money—losing 6–1 to Ronnie Baxter in the opening round. The following day however, Webster got through to the second round of the Sunday event in Gladbeck, earning his first prize money as a PDC player.

Having started from scratch in the PDC rankings, Webster had to build up ranking points by entering the PDC Pro Tour events. His best result came at the UK Open Scottish Regional Qualifier in March when he reached the semi-final. He also managed two quarter final appearances in Players Championship Events in the East Midlands in April and Atlanta in August. By 18 October he had played in 31 Pro Tour events. His PDC Prize Money, boosted by a run to the last 16 of the UK Open had totalled £10,800 and his ranking had improved to 71.

In his debut at the PDC World Championship in 2010, Webster defeated established players including Mark Walsh, Peter Manley and Co Stompé to reach the semi-final, where he was outplayed by Taylor. Webster did, however, earn the consolation of third place via a playoff match with van Barneveld, earning an extra £20,000 in the process and entering the top 32 in the PDC rankings for the first time.

He began 2010 poorly with repeated early exits in Floor events but found form by a few quarter final appearances and by reaching consecutive semi-finals in a Players Championship and UK Open Qualifier 8 in Wigan during May. This cemented his qualification for the 2010 UK Open Darts. However he was knocked out in his first match against Tony Eccles.

After the UK Open his poor floor form returned in which he failed to progress past the last 32 in any event until the 2010 World Matchplay Darts in which he knocked out seventh seed Adrian Lewis 11–9 in the first round but was beaten 13–9 by Co Stompé This earned him £7,500 towards the order of merit.

His next major event was the 2010 Championship League Darts which he qualified for due to his order of merit ranking of 29 which put him into the last group – 8. He qualified from the group stage in fourth with wins over Jelle Klaasen, Michael van Gerwen, Dennis Priestley and Denis Ovens this meant that he played group winner Co Stompé in the semi-final in which he prevailed 6–3 however he was beaten 6–2 by Wayne Jones in the group final.

After this competition his floor event form sharply rose with a Victory over Richie Burnett in a Players Championship Final in Germany earning him his first ever PDC tournament victory and £6,000. This was followed soon later with a Semi-final and final appearance in a weekend in Barnsley further pushing him up the order of merit.

Due to his 3rd-place finish at the previous World Championship Webster qualified for the 2010 Grand Slam of Darts. Despite losing 5–2 to Wayne Jones in his first game a 5–3 win over Mark Hylton left him with a chance to qualify however even though he beat Gary Anderson 5–3 it was not enough as he missed multiple doubles to win the match with the required scoreline of 5–1 to qualify.

Webster was the Welsh captain for the inaugural 2010 PDC World Cup of Darts in which Barrie Bates was his partner. After beating New Zealand in their first game 6–4 Webster and Bates became the surprise package of the tournament topping their group in the next stage which included wins over the Scottish pairing of Gary Anderson and Robert Thornton and the Spanish team of Carlos Rodriguez and Antonio Alcinas who had knocked out the England team consisting of world number one and two Phil Taylor and James Wade. This meant that they played the Australian team of Simon Whitlock and Paul Nicholson in the Semi-finals. A 6–5 win for Webster over Nicholson in the opening match proved crucial as it kept them in the match after the other 3 matches were won by Australia taking the match the doubles match. They won this 6–4 which meant that the match would go to a sudden death leg to decide who went to the final. Despite Australia winning the throw for the bull and opening with a 180 from Whitlock consecutive 140's from Wales got them back in the match. Bates then held his nerve to take out a 116 to take them to the final which also went to the doubles match after Webster defeated Co Stompé and Raymond van Barneveld back to back with a 100+ average in each match. However they lost the doubles 8–5 to finish runners up in the tournament.

=== 2011 ===
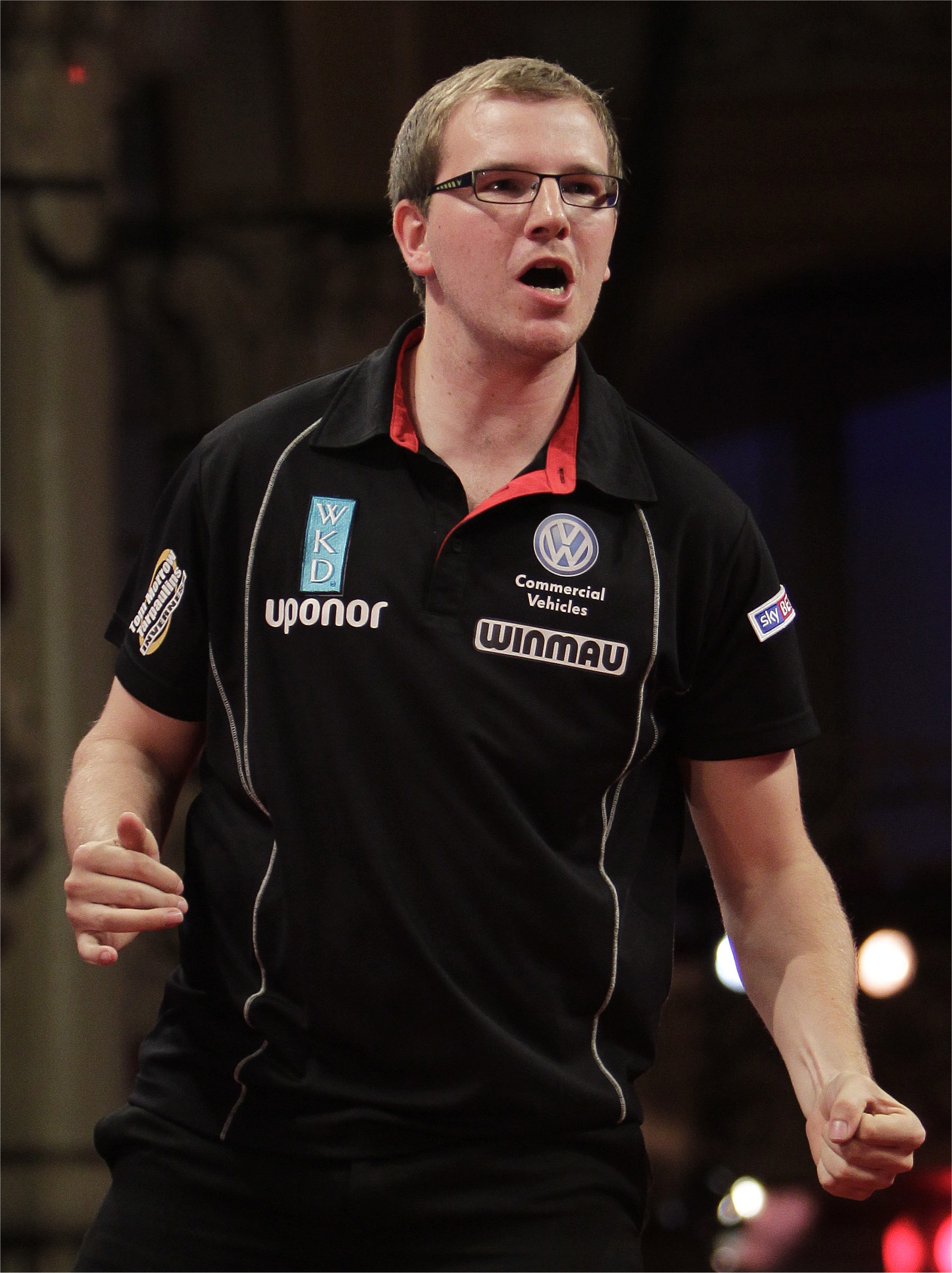
Webster in 2011

Webster continued this good form into the 2011 PDC World Darts Championship in which he knocked out Steve Maish, number 8 seed Ronnie Baxter and Mark Hylton in the early rounds losing only 1 set between them. In the quarter-final he knocked out 15-time and defending world champion Phil Taylor by 5 sets to 2 to reach his second successive World Championship semi-final. He lost 6–4 to Adrian Lewis in the semi-finals, continuing the trend of players beating Taylor but going on to lose their next match when the event is televised. This earned him £50,000 and Moved him into the top 16 of the PDC rankings for the first time at number 13.

Webster played in the 2011 Premier League. His early form was strong, pushing Taylor hard with a 170 out-shot and avenging his loss to Adrian Lewis with an average of 110.19 – the second highest ever achieved in the Premier league (behind Taylor). However, he then had a great loss in form, receiving 8–1 defeats at the hands of James Wade and Phil Taylor among other heavy losses, leaving him bottom of the table with two wins and a draw from his fourteen matches.

At the 2011 UK Open, Webster reached the semi-finals and was ahead against James Wade before losing 10–9.

Webster reached his second quarter-final at the Grand Slam of Darts, once again beating John Part en route to a defeat by Lewis.

Webster finally reached his first PDC major final at the 2011 Players Championship Finals, beating number one seed Justin Pipe after seeing six match darts missed against him, followed by wins over Dave Chisnall and Wes Newton, before being defeated by Kevin Painter.

=== 2012 ===
Webster's good form from the previous week did not help him, however, at the 2012 World Championship where he was upset by fellow countryman, Richie Burnett, 2–3. Webster had a dart at double top in the deciding set to win the match, but missed and was the highest seed to exit in the first round of the event. He then teamed up with Burnett for his second World Cup and together they reached the semi-finals with wins over Croatia and South Africa. Webster could not reach his second successive World Cup final however, as the English pair of Phil Taylor and Adrian Lewis won 1–3. At the World Matchplay, Webster defeated Colin Lloyd 10–6 in the first round, before losing to Andy Hamilton 6–13 in the last 16. In September, Webster threw a nine darter in the opening leg of his first round match against Andree Welge in Event 4 of the European Tour, but went on to lose 4–6. After all 33 ProTour events of 2012 had been played, Webster was 27th on the Order of Merit, inside the top 32 who qualified for the Players Championship Finals. He lost to Taylor 2–6 in the first round.

=== 2013 ===
Webster beat Ian White in the first round of the 2013 World Championship, but then lost to Colin Lloyd 2–4. He played in his third World Cup of Darts and second with Richie Burnett and they reached the semi-finals where they faced the number one seeds of Phil Taylor and Adrian Lewis. Webster lost to Taylor 1–4, but Burnett defeated Lewis meaning a doubles match was needed to settle the tie. Burnett missed one dart at double ten to complete a 140 finish for the match and Wales would lose 3–4. Webster played Burnett in the third round of the UK Open and was defeated 2–9, and he lost 4–10 to Justin Pipe in the first round of the World Matchplay. Webster beat Wes Newton 5–2 in his opening group game of the Grand Slam of Darts but then lost 5–1 against Simon Whitlock to need a win over Ross Smith to stand a chance of qualifying for the last 16 and he did so 5–3. However, he was tied on points and leg difference with Newton so a nine-dart shootout was required. Webster had already scored enough to not require throwing his final three darts to eliminate Newton and was then defeated 10–6 by reigning BDO world champion Scott Waites.

=== 2014 ===
Webster saw a welcome return to form at the 2014 World Championship by winning each of his first three games in deciding sets over Mensur Suljović (3–2), John Henderson (4–3 having survived three match darts) and Raymond van Barneveld 4–3 (winning the final six legs of the match without reply). He stated after the van Barneveld match that coming into the event his career was on the line as he was close to dropping out of the top 32, but by earning £25,000 for reaching the last eight his place was secured. Webster lost the first three sets of his quarter-final against Michael van Gerwen inside 20 minutes and was also 4–1 down. He then raised his game as the Dutchman's dropped off to win two sets in a row, but lost the next to see his run in the event end with a 5–3 defeat. Van Gerwen was also the victor when the two met in the fifth round of the UK Open, triumphing 9–4. He did not qualify for another major during the rest of the year. Webster and Burnett advanced to the quarter-finals of the World Cup of Darts, where their match against the Australian pairing of Simon Whitlock and Paul Nicholson went into a deciding doubles match which Wales lost 4–0. In November, Webster lost to Jay Foreman 4–2 in the Grand Slam of Darts Wild Card Qualifier which meant that he failed to play in the event for the first time.

=== 2015 ===
Webster saw off Ron Meulenkamp 3–1 in the first round of the 2015 World Championship and then missed one dart to level at 1–1 in the next round against Phil Taylor, going on to be whitewashed 4–0. He just hung on to his top 32 ranking after the event as he was the world number 32. At the first UK Open Qualifier of the year, Webster reached his first semi-final in an individual event for three years where he was edged out 6–5 by Michael van Gerwen. The result helped him enter the UK Open at the third round stage but he was beaten 9–5 by William O'Connor. Webster played with Jamie Lewis at the World Cup for the first time and they suffered a surprise 5–3 loss to Hong Kong in the opening round.

Webster took advantage of Stephen Bunting missing too many doubles in their first round match at the World Grand Prix to defeat him 2–1 in sets and then produced a very good performance in seeing off world number five Adrian Lewis 3–0 with an average of 92 in the double-start event. In Webster's first major quarter-final in 18 months he continued his run by edging past Jelle Klaasen 3–2 in a deciding leg. He attributed his form in the event to the birth of his daughter Ella which Webster said had given him a new lease of life. Webster's first major semi-final in almost four years ended with a 4–1 loss to reigning champion Michael van Gerwen. 5–3 wins over Keegan Brown and Michel van der Horst helped Webster qualify from his group at the Grand Slam and he then took out 10 of his 14 attempts at a double to eliminate Gary Anderson 10–6. However, the opposite happened in the quarter-finals against Raymond van Barneveld as Webster could only hit 34% of his doubles to be beaten 16–12.

=== 2016 ===
Webster did not drop a set in seeing off Mick McGowan and Terry Jenkins at the 2016 World Championship, but then lost 4–1 to Alan Norris in the third round. Two semi-finals and a quarter-final in the UK Open Qualifiers saw him finish fifth on the Order of Merit to enter the UK Open at the third round stage. He defeated Matthew Edgar 9–3, Dirk van Duijvenbode 9–4 and Mensur Suljović 9–5 to reach his third major quarter-final in six months and was comfortably beaten 10–3 by Phil Taylor. Webster and Gerwyn Price lost 4–2 in a doubles match in the second round of the World Cup. After his 10–6 defeat to Adrian Lewis in the opening round of the World Matchplay, Webster said that dartitis, which he has fought over the past few years, was evident in the latter half of the game and that he was trying to beat the player and himself during matches. He reached one Pro Tour quarter-final during the rest of the year as well as losing in the first round of the Players Championship Finals.

=== 2017 ===
Webster saw off Joe Murnan 3–0 in the first round of the 2017 World Championship and then held on when Mensur Suljović rallied from 3–1 down, by taking all three legs in the deciding set to win 4–3 and reach the third round for the second successive year. The opposite then happened as it was Webster who levelled at 3–3 having been 3–1 down, but Daryl Gurney took the seventh set by three legs to one to progress 4–3. Victories over Finland, Ireland and Russia helped Webster and Gerwyn Price into the semi-finals of the World Cup. A pair of 4–2 wins over the Belgian team of Kim and Ronny Huybrechts saw them play in the final, where their only point came courtesy of a Webster win over Raymond van Barneveld as they went down 3–1 to the Dutch. Webster has been battling dartitis in recent years, but hoped that this result in a team event could boost his individual performances.

=== 2020 ===
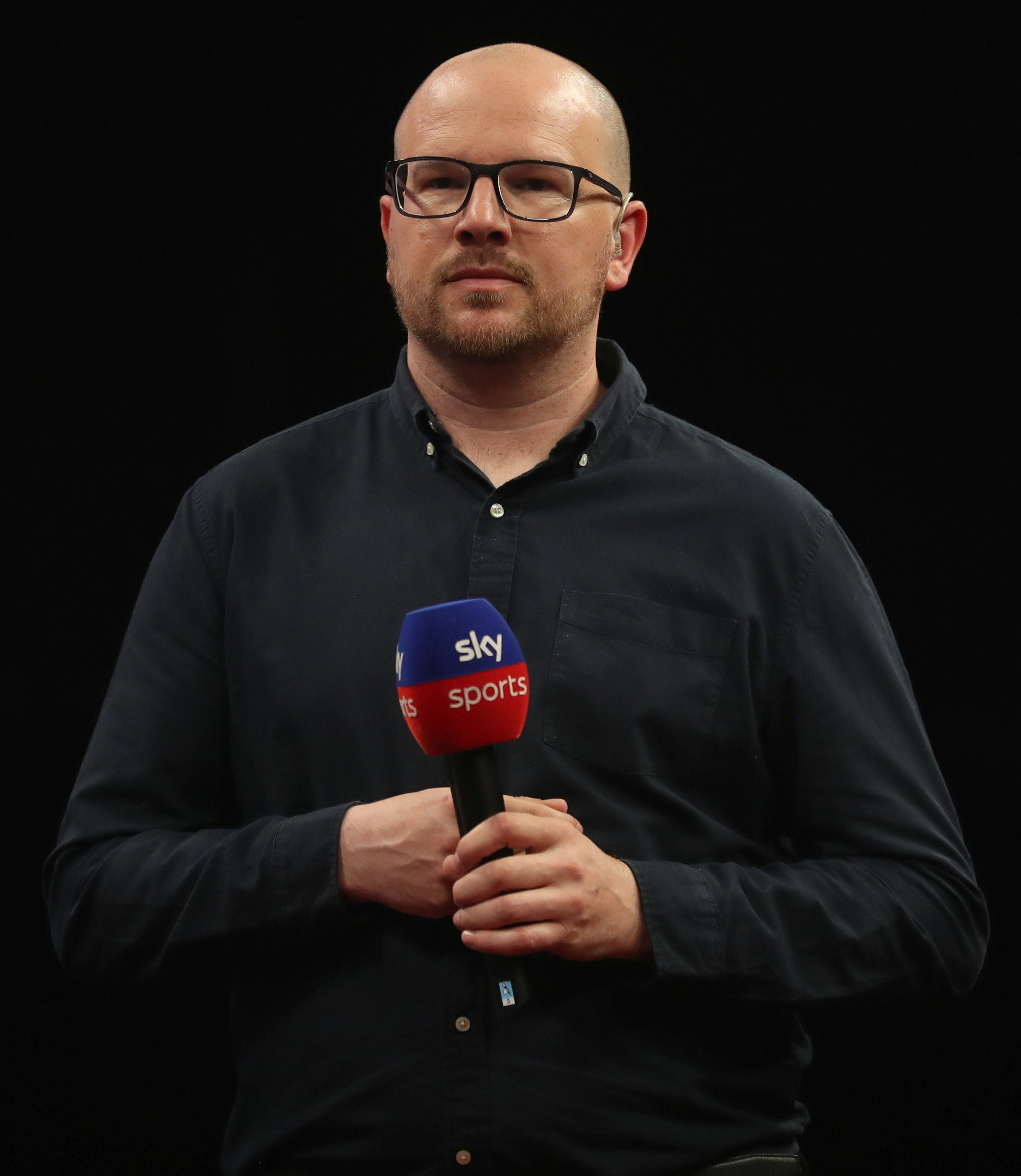
Mark Webster working for Sky Sports (2022)

He did not participate in the 2020 Q School to regain his tour card.

== Personal life ==
In January 2026, Webster was diagnosed with hairy cell leukaemia.

== World Championship results ==
=== BDO ===
- 2007: First round (lost to Tony Eccles 0–3)
- 2008: Winner (beat Simon Whitlock 7–5)
- 2009: Second round (lost to John Walton 0–4)

=== PDC ===
- 2010: Semi-finals (lost to Phil Taylor 0–6), beat Raymond van Barneveld in 3rd place play-off 10–8 (legs)
- 2011: Semi-finals (lost to Adrian Lewis 4–6)
- 2012: First round (lost to Richie Burnett 2–3)
- 2013: Second round (lost to Colin Lloyd 2–4)
- 2014: Quarter-finals (lost to Michael van Gerwen 3–5)
- 2015: Second round (lost to Phil Taylor 0–4)
- 2016: Third round (lost to Alan Norris 1–4)
- 2017: Third round (lost to Daryl Gurney 3–4)
- 2018: First round (lost to Paul Lim 2–3)

== Career finals ==
=== BDO major finals: 3 (1 title) ===
Legend
World Championship (1–0)
Zuiderduin Masters (0–1)
International Darts League (0–1)

Outcome	No.	Year	Championship	Opponent in the final	Score (Note: (l) = score in legs, (s) = score in sets, (p) = score in points, (m) = score in matches.)
Runner-up	1.	2007	International Darts League	(Scotland) Gary Anderson	9–13 (s)
Runner-up	2.	2007	Zuiderduin Masters	(Scotland) Gary Anderson	4–5 (s)
Winner	1.	2008	World Championship	(Australia) Simon Whitlock	7–5 (s)

=== PDC major finals: 1 ===
Outcome	No.	Year	Championship	Opponent in the final	Score
Runner-up	1.	2011	Players Championship Finals	(England) Kevin Painter	9–13 (l)

=== PDC team finals: 2 ===
Outcome	No.	Year	Championship	Team	Teammate	Opponents in the final	Score
Runner-up	1.	2010	World Cup of Darts	Wales	Barrie Bates	Netherlands – Raymond van Barneveld and Co Stompé	2–4 (p)
Runner-up	2.	2017	World Cup of Darts (2)	Wales	Gerwyn Price	Netherlands – Michael van Gerwen and Raymond van Barneveld	1–3 (m)

== Performance timeline ==
BDO

Tournament	2006	2007	2008	2009
BDO World Championship	DNQ	1R	W	2R
International Darts League	DNQ	F	Not held	
World Darts Trophy	DNQ	QF	Not held	
World Masters	SF	(Note: Played at the Grand Slam of Darts)	6R	PDC
Zuiderduin Masters	DNQ	F	RR	PDC

PDC

Tournament	2007	2008	2009	2010	2011		2012	2013	2014	2015	2016	2017	2018	2019
PDC World Championship	BDO			SF	SF		1R	2R	QF	2R	3R	3R	1R	DNQ
UK Open	Non-PDC		5R	3R	SF		3R	3R	5R	3R	QF	4R	DNQ	3R
World Matchplay	Non-PDC		DNQ	2R	QF		2R	1R	DNQ		1R	DNQ		
World Grand Prix	Non-PDC		DNQ		QF		1R	DNQ		SF	DNQ	1R	DNQ	
European Championship	NH	DNP	DNQ		1R		1R	1R	DNQ					
Grand Slam of Darts	RR	QF	2R	RR	QF		RR	2R	DNQ	QF	DNQ	RR	RR	DNQ
Players Championship Finals	Not held		DNQ		2R	F	1R	DNQ		1R	1R	1R	1R	DNQ
Non-ranked televised events
Premier League Darts	DNP				8th		DNP							
Championship League Darts	NH	DNP		RR	RR		RR	RR	Not held					
PDC World Cup of Darts	NH			F	NH		SF	SF	QF	1R	2R	F	DNQ	
Career statistics
Year-end ranking	-	-	67	25	6		11	29	32	22	25	30	41	77

PDC European Tour

Season	1	2	3	4	5	6	7	8	9	10	11	12	13
2012	ADO; 3R	GDC; 3R	EDO; DNP	GDM; 1R	DDM; DNP								
2013	UKM; 3R	EDT; QF	EDO; 2R	ADO; 1R	GDT; 1R	GDC; 1R	GDM; DNP	DDM; 2R					
2014	GDC; DNQ	DDM; DNQ	GDM; 1R	ADO; 1R	GDT; 1R	EDO; DNQ	EDG; DNQ	EDT; DNQ					
2015	GDC; DNQ	GDT; 1R	GDM; DNQ	DDM; DNQ	IDO; 1R	EDO; 3R	EDT; DNQ	EDM; DNQ	EDG; 2R				
2016	DDM; 2R	GDM; DNQ	GDT; DNQ	EDM; 1R	ADO; DNQ	EDO; DNQ	IDO; DNQ	EDT; DNQ	EDG; DNQ	GDC; QF			
2017	GDC; DNQ	GDM; 2R	GDO; DNQ	EDG; 3R	GDT; DNQ	EDM; DNQ	ADO; DNQ	EDO; 1R	DDM; DNQ	GDG; DNQ	IDO; 1R	EDT; DNQ	
2018	EDO; DNQ	GDG; DNQ	GDO; DNQ	ADO; DNQ	EDG; DNQ	DDM; DNQ	GDT; DNQ	DDO; DNQ	EDM; DNQ	GDC; 2R	DDC; DNQ	IDO; DNQ	EDT; DNQ
2019	EDO; DNQ	GDC; DNQ	GDG; DNQ	GDO; DNQ	ADO; 3R	EDG; DNQ	DDM; DNQ	DDO; DNQ	CDO; DNQ	ADC; 1R	EDM; DNQ	IDO; DNQ	GDT; DNQ

PDC Players Championships

Season	1	2	3	4	5	6	7	8	9	10	11	12	13	14	15	16	17	18	19	20	21	22	23	24	25	26	27	28	29	30	31	32	33	34	35	36	37
2009	DON; DNP	GIB; DNP		GLA; 1R	GLA; 2R	IRV; 2R	WIG; 2R	BRE; 1R	COV; 2R	NUL; 2R	NUL; 2R	TAU; 1R	DER; QF	NEW; 1R	BAR; 1R	BAR; 2R	DIN; 2R	DIN; 1R	LVE; 1R	SYD; 4R	ONT; 3R	ATL; QF	ATL; 3R	SAL; 2R	SAL; 3R	DUB; 1R	DUB; 2R	KIL; 3R	NUL; 2R	NUL; 3R	IRV; 3R	IRV; 2R					
2010	GIB; 1R	GIB; 3R	SWI; 1R	DER; 2R	GLA; 3R	GLA; QF	WIG; QF	CRA; 4R	BAR; 3R	DER; 1R	WIG; QF	WIG; SF	SAL; 1R	SAL; 1R	BAR; 3R	BAR; 2R	HAA; 2R	HAA; 1R	LVE; 3R	LVE; 3R	LVE; 2R	SYD; 2R	ONT; 4R	ONT; 4R	CRA; QF	CRA; 4R	NUL; 1R	NUL; 3R	DUB; 4R	DUB; 4R	KIL; 4R	BAD; W	BAD; 4R	BAR; SF	BAR; F	DER; 4R	DER; 4R
2011	HAL; 4R	HAL; 4R	DER; 4R	DER; 1R	CRA; 2R	CRA; 3R	VIE; DNP		CRA; 2R	CRA; QF	BAR; 4R	BAR; 4R	NUL; 3R	NUL; 4R	ONT; DNP		DER; 2R	DER; QF	NUL; QF	NUL; SF	DUB; 4R	DUB; 3R	KIL; 4R	GLA; 3R	GLA; 1R	ALI; QF	ALI; QF	CRA; QF	CRA; 4R	WIG; SF	WIG; 4R						
2012	ALI; 4R	ALI; 4R	REA; 4R	REA; 4R	CRA; SF	CRA; 4R	BIR; 2R	BIR; 3R	CRA; 3R	CRA; 2R	BAR; 1R	BAR; 1R	DUB; QF	DUB; 4R	KIL; 3R	KIL; 4R	CRA; 3R	CRA; 3R	BAR; 3R	BAR; 4R																	
2013	WIG; 2R	WIG; 2R	WIG; 1R	WIG; 2R	CRA; 2R	CRA; 1R	BAR; 2R	BAR; 1R	DUB; 2R	DUB; 3R	KIL; 2R	KIL; 3R	WIG; 1R	WIG; 3R	BAR; 2R	BAR; 2R																					
2014	BAR; 1R	BAR; 1R	CRA; 3R	CRA; 4R	WIG; 1R	WIG; 1R	WIG; 3R	WIG; 1R	CRA; 4R	CRA; 4R	COV; 3R	COV; 3R	CRA; 1R	CRA; 1R	DUB; 3R	DUB; QF	CRA; 1R	CRA; 2R	COV; 2R	COV; 1R																	
2015	BAR; 2R	BAR; 3R	BAR; 2R	BAR; 2R	BAR; 2R	COV; 3R	COV; 3R	COV; 3R	CRA; 3R	CRA; 4R	BAR; QF	BAR; 3R	WIG; 2R	WIG; 3R	BAR; 3R	BAR; 3R	DUB; 2R	DUB; 1R	COV; 1R	COV; 3R																	
2016	BAR; 2R	BAR; 2R	BAR; QF	BAR; 3R	BAR; 1R	BAR; 2R	BAR; 3R	COV; QF	COV; 3R	BAR; 1R	BAR; 3R	BAR; 2R	BAR; 1R	BAR; 1R	BAR; 2R	BAR; 3R	DUB; 1R	DUB; 4R	BAR; 4R	BAR; 1R																	
2017	BAR; 1R	BAR; 2R	BAR; 3R	BAR; 1R	MIL; QF	MIL; 3R	BAR; 2R	BAR; 1R	WIG; 1R	WIG; 1R	MIL; 2R	MIL; 2R	WIG; 1R	WIG; 4R	BAR; 3R	BAR; 3R	BAR; 2R	BAR; 1R	DUB; 1R	DUB; 2R	BAR; 3R	BAR; 2R															
2018	BAR; 1R	BAR; 1R	BAR; 1R	BAR; 2R	MIL; 1R	MIL; 1R	BAR; 2R	BAR; QF	WIG; 3R	WIG; 4R	MIL; 1R	MIL; 2R	WIG; 4R	WIG; 2R	BAR; SF	BAR; 1R	BAR; 2R	BAR; 2R	DUB; 2R	DUB; 3R	BAR; 1R	BAR; 3R															
2019	WIG; 2R	WIG; 1R	WIG; 2R	WIG; 2R	BAR; 1R	BAR; 2R	WIG; 3R	WIG; 2R	BAR; 1R	BAR; 2R	BAR; 1R	BAR; 2R	BAR; 1R	BAR; 1R	BAR; 1R	BAR; 1R	WIG; 1R	WIG; 1R	BAR; 2R	BAR; 2R	HIL; 1R	HIL; 3R	BAR; 3R	BAR; 1R	BAR; 2R	BAR; 1R	DUB; 1R	DUB; 3R	BAR; 2R	BAR; 1R							

Performance Table Legend
W	Won the tournament	F	Finalist	SF	Semifinalist	QF	Quarterfinalist	#R; RR; Prel.	Lost in # round Round-robin; Preliminary round	DQ	Disqualified
DNQ	Did not qualify	DNP	Did not participate	WD	Withdrew	NH	Tournament not held	#R; RR; Prel.	Lost in # round Round-robin; Preliminary round	NYF	Not yet founded
