= Terry Hayhurst =

Canadian darts player

Personal information
- Nickname: "The Titan"
- Born: March 11, 1985 (age 41) Brantford, Ontario, Canada
- Home town: Brantford, Ontario, Canada

Sport
- Sport: Darts
- Playing since: 2001
- Darts: 22g L-Style Terry Hayhurst
- Laterality: Right-handed
- Walk-on music: "I Made It" by Kevin Rudolf

Organisation (see split in darts)
- BDO: 2009–2015
- PDC: 2004–2009

WDF major events – best performances
- World Masters: Last 40: 2011

PDC premier events – best performances
- US Open/WSoD: Last 128: 2007, 2008

Other tournament wins
- Tournament: Years
- Canada National Championships Canadian Open Cleveland Darts Extraveganza: 2009; 2010, 2012; 2013

Terry "The Titan" Hayhurst (born March 11, 1985) is a Canadian former professional darts player from Brantford, Ontario. His accomplishments include winning the Canadian Open in 2010 and 2012. In 2011, he was ranked #12 in the world and #2 in the Americas by the World Darts Federation.

== Career ==
Hayhurst was the youngest junior darts player to win a Canadian national title, at the age of 12. He went on to win four more national junior singles titles, eight national junior doubles titles, two national mixed doubles titles, eight national junior team titles, and eight Canada Cup titles.

In May 2009, Hayhurst won his first NDFC Canadian national championship. For the 2009–2010 season, Hayhurst held the #1 position in Canada for 12 months. In 2011, Hayhurst represented Canada at the WDF World Cup team in Castlebar, Ireland.
