= 2010 World Matchplay =

2010 Stanjames.com World Matchplay

Tournament information
- Dates: 17–25 July 2010
- Venue: Winter Gardens
- Location: Blackpool, England
- Organisation(s): Professional Darts Corporation (PDC)
- Format: Legs; Final – best of 35
- Prize fund: £400,000
- Winner's share: £100,000
- Nine-dart finish: Raymond van Barneveld
- High checkout: 160 Mark Walsh

Champion(s)
- Phil Taylor (ENG)

The 2010 Stanjames.com World Matchplay was the 17th annual staging of the World Matchplay, organised by the Professional Darts Corporation. The tournament took place from 17 to 25 July 2010.

Phil Taylor successfully defended his title, defeating Raymond van Barneveld in the final to win his eleventh World Matchplay. Van Barneveld also hit only the second ever nine-dart finish at the World Matchplay in his first round victory over Denis Ovens.

The final of the 2010 PDC Women's World Darts Championship took place at this event, with Stacy Bromberg defeating Tricia Wright by a score of 6 legs to 5.

== 3D ==
The semi-finals and final of the World Matchplay were shown in 3D for the first time ever in darts. Over 1,000 venues in the UK broadcast the matches in 3D via Sky Sports. Commentator Sid Waddell was quoted as saying: "It's a revolution in darts TV broadcasting".

== Prize money ==
For the second consecutive World Matchplay, the prize fund was £400,000.

Position (no. of players)		Prize money (Total: £400,000)
Winner	(1)	£100,000
Runner-Up	(1)	£50,000
Semi-finalists	(2)	£25,000
Quarter-finalists	(4)	£15,000
Second round	(8)	£7,500
First round	(16)	£5,000
Nine-dart finish	(1)	£5,000

== Qualification ==
The qualification is the top 16 in the PDC Order of Merit qualify automatically and a further 16 have to qualify for the tournament by being in the top 16 of the Players Championships order of merit.

The participants are:

=== PDC Top 16 ===
1. (England) Phil Taylor (winner)
2. (Netherlands) Raymond van Barneveld (runner-up)
3. (England) James Wade (semi-finals)
4. (England) Mervyn King (first round)
5. (England) Terry Jenkins (first round)
6. (England) Ronnie Baxter (second round)
7. (England) Adrian Lewis (first round)
8. (England) Mark Walsh (second round)
9. (England) Colin Lloyd (first round)
10. (England) Andy Hamilton (first round)
11. (England) Colin Osborne (first round)
12. (Australia) Simon Whitlock (semi-finals)
13. (Scotland) Robert Thornton (first round)
14. (England) Dennis Priestley (first round)
15. (England) Alan Tabern (second round)
16. (Australia) Paul Nicholson (first round)

=== PDPA Players Championship qualifiers ===
1. (Netherlands) Vincent van der Voort (second round)
2. (England) Andy Smith (first round)
3. (England) Wayne Jones (quarter-finals)
4. (England) Jamie Caven (first round)
5. (Netherlands) Co Stompé (quarter-finals)
6. (Wales) Mark Webster (second round)
7. (England) Wes Newton (first round)
8. (England) Denis Ovens (first round)
9. (Scotland) Gary Anderson (second round)
10. (Netherlands) Jelle Klaasen (quarter-finals)
11. (England) Tony Eccles (first round)
12. (England) Steve Brown (second round)
13. (England) Kevin Painter (quarter-finals)
14. (England) Mark Dudbridge (first round)
15. (England) Steve Beaton (second round)
16. (Wales) Barrie Bates (first round)

== Draw ==
First round (best of 19 legs); 17–20 July
1	(England) Phil Taylor 114.99	10
(Wales) Barrie Bates 93.20	6
16	(Australia) Paul Nicholson 84.07	3
(England) Steve Beaton 89.75	10
8	(England) Mark Walsh 90.46	12
(England) Mark Dudbridge 89.62	10
9	(England) Colin Lloyd 84.71	9
(England) Kevin Painter 88.89	11
4	(England) Mervyn King 93.26	4
(Netherlands) Jelle Klaasen 94.15	10
13	(Scotland) Robert Thornton 92.79	0
(Scotland) Gary Anderson 98.24	10
5	(England) Terry Jenkins 88.57	6
(England) Steve Brown 87.45	10
12	(Australia) Simon Whitlock 94.86	10
(England) Tony Eccles 88.85	1
2	(Netherlands) Raymond van Barneveld 97.63	10
(England) Denis Ovens 84.70	1
15	(England) Alan Tabern 90.01	12
(England) Wes Newton 88.54	10
7	(England) Adrian Lewis 90.88	9
(Wales) Mark Webster 90.86	11
10	(England) Andy Hamilton 89.65	10
(Netherlands) Co Stompé 90.17	12
3	(England) James Wade 89.14	10
(England) Andy Smith 87.63	8
14	(England) Dennis Priestley 90.62	6
(Netherlands) Vincent van der Voort 92.21	10
6	(England) Ronnie Baxter 93.02	10
(England) Jamie Caven 88.15	7
11	(England) Colin Osborne 87.61	8
(England) Wayne Jones 87.98	10

Second round (best of 25 legs); 21–22 July
1	(England) Phil Taylor 104.60	13
(England) Steve Beaton 92.38	4
8	(England) Mark Walsh 91.91	12
(England) Kevin Painter 91.75	14
(Netherlands) Jelle Klaasen 86.24	14
(Scotland) Gary Anderson 87.84	12
(England) Steve Brown 93.19	10
12	(Australia) Simon Whitlock 94.59	13
2	(Netherlands) Raymond van Barneveld 103.85	13
15	(England) Alan Tabern 96.47	5
(Wales) Mark Webster 85.61	9
(Netherlands) Co Stompé 92.16	13
3	(England) James Wade 92.34	13
(Netherlands) Vincent van der Voort 94.98	10
6	(England) Ronnie Baxter 89.52	9
(England) Wayne Jones 90.29	13

Quarter-finals (best of 31 legs); 23 July
1	(England) Phil Taylor 103.31	16
(England) Kevin Painter 96.77	4
(Netherlands) Jelle Klaasen 92.51	8
12	(Australia) Simon Whitlock 93.27	16
2	(Netherlands) Raymond van Barneveld 95.89	16
(Netherlands) Co Stompé 90.26	12
3	(England) James Wade 97.93	16
(England) Wayne Jones 95.52	12

Semi-finals (best of 33 legs); 24 July
1	(England) Phil Taylor 103.46	17
12	(Australia) Simon Whitlock 94.45	4
2	(Netherlands) Raymond van Barneveld 99.42	17
3	(England) James Wade 96.00	8

Final (best of 35 legs); 25 July
1	(England) Phil Taylor 105.16	18
2	(Netherlands) Raymond van Barneveld 100.11	12

== Statistics ==
Player	Eliminated	Played	Legs Won	Legs Lost	LWAT	100+	140+	180s	High checkout	3-dart average
(England) Phil Taylor	Winner	5	74	30	26	125	92	36	136	106.31
(Netherlands) Raymond van Barneveld	Final	5	68	44	26	164	80	19	142	99.38
(England) James Wade	Semi-finals	4	47	47	20	131	63	24	145	95.27
(Australia) Simon Whitlock	Semi-finals	4	43	36	14	108	57	15	126	94.30
(England) Kevin Painter	Quarter-finals	3	29	37	11	78	55	8	112	92.47
(Netherlands) Co Stompé	Quarter-finals	3	37	35	15	95	35	15	130	90.86
(England) Wayne Jones	Quarter-finals	3	35	33	14	119	47	14	128	91.26
(Netherlands) Jelle Klaasen	Quarter-finals	3	32	32	13	83	28	12	148	90.97
(Netherlands) Vincent van der Voort	Second round	2	20	19	7	49	26	6	157	93.60
(England) Steve Brown	Second round	2	20	19	7	60	26	5	149	90.32
(England) Alan Tabern	Second round	2	17	23	5	63	22	10	156	93.24
(Wales) Mark Webster	Second round	2	20	22	5	56	23	3	122	88.24
(Scotland) Gary Anderson	Second round	2	22	14	10	54	27	5	81	93.04
(England) Ronnie Baxter	Second round	2	19	20	6	48	25	8	88	91.27
(England) Mark Walsh	Second round	2	24	24	10	79	34	9	160	91.18
(England) Steve Beaton	Second round	2	14	16	5	26	27	6	136	91.07
(England) Adrian Lewis	First round	1	9	11	4	18	11	6	82	90.88
(England) Dennis Priestley	First round	1	6	10	2	16	13	4	98	90.62
(England) Andy Hamilton	First round	1	10	12	3	33	5	2	81	89.65
(England) Mark Dudbridge	First round	1	10	12	4	27	13	3	144	89.62
(England) Tony Eccles	First round	1	1	10	0	20	6	1	40	88.85
(England) Terry Jenkins	First round	1	6	10	3	21	10	3	96	88.57
(England) Wes Newton	First round	1	10	12	3	26	12	5	107	88.54
(England) Jamie Caven	First round	1	7	10	2	22	6	2	72	88.15
(England) Andy Smith	First round	1	8	10	2	18	17	3	151	87.63
(England) Colin Osborne	First round	1	8	10	3	21	11	2	97	87.61
(England) Colin Lloyd	First round	1	9	11	5	19	16	1	80	84.71
(England) Denis Ovens	First round	1	1	10	0	13	7	1	32	84.70
(England) Mervyn King	First round	1	4	10	2	12	13	2	80	93.26
(Scotland) Robert Thornton	First round	1	0	10	0	11	9	1	—	92.79
(Wales) Barrie Bates	First round	1	6	10	1	27	12	0	96	93.20
(Australia) Paul Nicholson	First round	1	3	10	0	17	8	1	108	84.07
