= 2011 UK Open =

2011 Speedy Hire UK Open

Tournament information
- Dates: 2–5 June 2011
- Venue: Reebok Stadium
- Location: Bolton, England
- Organisation(s): Professional Darts Corporation (PDC)
- Format: Legs; Final – best of 21
- Prize fund: £200,000
- Winner's share: £40,000

Champion(s)
- James Wade (ENG)

The 2011 Speedy Hire UK Open was the ninth year of the PDC darts tournament where, following numerous regional qualifying heats throughout Britain, players competed in a single elimination tournament to be crowned champion. The tournament was held at the Reebok Stadium in Bolton, England, from 2 to 5 June 2011, and has the nickname, "the FA Cup of darts", as a random draw is staged after each round until the final.

The title was won by James Wade, who defeated Wes Newton 11–8 in the final.

== Format and qualifiers ==
=== 2011 UK Open qualifiers ===
There were eight qualifying events staged in Barnsley and Wigan between February and May 2011 to determine the UK Open Order of Merit Table. The tournament winners were:

No.	Date	Venue	Winner	Legs	Runner-up	Total Prize Money	Winner	Runner-up
1	Saturday 26 February	Barnsley Metrodome, Barnsley	Steve Brown (England)	6 – 3	(England) Ian White	£34,600	£6,000	£3,000
2	Sunday 27 February	Barnsley Metrodome, Barnsley	Michael Smith (England)	6 – 5	(England) Dave Chisnall	£34,600	£6,000	£3,000
3	Saturday 12 March	Robin Park Tennis Centre, Wigan	Adrian Lewis (England)	6 – 4	(Scotland) Robert Thornton	£34,600	£6,000	£3,000
4	Sunday 13 March	Robin Park Tennis Centre, Wigan	Vincent van der Voort (Netherlands)	6 – 4	(Netherlands) Raymond van Barneveld	£34,600	£6,000	£3,000
5	Saturday 16 April	Barnsley Metrodome, Barnsley	Gary Anderson (Scotland)	6 – 4	(England) Phil Taylor	£34,600	£6,000	£3,000
6	Sunday 17 April	Barnsley Metrodome, Barnsley	Phil Taylor (England)	6 – 1	(England) Joe Cullen	£34,600	£6,000	£3,000
7	Saturday 30 April	Robin Park Tennis Centre, Wigan	Gary Anderson (Scotland)	6 – 2	(England) Phil Taylor	£34,600	£6,000	£3,000
8	Sunday 1 May	Robin Park Tennis Centre, Wigan	Phil Taylor (England)	6 – 3	(England) Colin Osborne	£34,600	£6,000	£3,000

The six players above that won a qualifying tournament all finished in the Top 32 in the merit table and thus entered the main tournament at the third round stage.

The tournament featured 172 players. As in previous years, eight UK Open qualifiers were staged across the north of England, where players' winnings were collated into the UK Open Order of Merit. The top 32 players in the Order of Merit, who played a minimum of two events, received a place in the third round of the final tournament. In addition, the next 76 players in the Order of Merit qualified for the tournament, but needed to start in the earlier rounds played on the Thursday. A further 64 players qualified via regional qualifying tournaments.

=== Top 32 in Order of Merit (receiving byes into third round) ===
1. (England) Phil Taylor
2. (Scotland) Gary Anderson
3. (England) Adrian Lewis
4. (England) Steve Brown
5. (Scotland) Robert Thornton
6. (Netherlands) Vincent van der Voort
7. (England) Wes Newton
8. (Australia) Simon Whitlock
9. (England) Michael Smith
10. (England) Mervyn King
11. (Canada) John Part
12. (England) Colin Osborne
13. (England) Darren Johnson
14. (England) Dave Chisnall
15. (England) Joe Cullen
16. (England) Ian White
17. (England) Wayne Jones
18. (England) Jamie Caven
19. (England) Andy Jenkins
20. (England) Mark Walsh
21. (Wales) Richie Burnett
22. (England) Mark Frost
23. (Netherlands) Raymond van Barneveld
24. (Australia) Paul Nicholson
25. (England) Denis Ovens
26. (England) Andy Hamilton
27. (England) Alan Tabern
28. (England) Ronnie Baxter
29. (England) Kevin Painter
30. (England) Mark Dudbridge
31. (England) Terry Jenkins
32. (Wales) Mark Webster

=== Remaining Order of Merit qualifiers (starting in first and preliminary round) ===
33. (England) Dennis Smith
34. (Netherlands) Michael van Gerwen
35. (Scotland) Peter Wright
36. (England) James Wade
37. (England) Kevin McDine
38. (England) Nigel Heydon
39. (England) Tony Eccles
40. (England) Scott Rand
41. (England) Mark Hylton
42. (Sweden) Magnus Caris
43. (England) Andy Smith
44. (England) Steve Beaton
45. (England) Colin Lloyd
46. (Northern Ireland) Brendan Dolan
47. (Wales) Barrie Bates
48. (England) Dennis Priestley
49. (Spain) Antonio Alcinas
50. (England) Michael Barnard
51. (Scotland) John Henderson
52. (England) Chris Aubrey
53. (England) Tony Ayres
54. (England) Alex Roy
55. (England) Mark Lawrence
56. (England) Matt Clark
57. (Netherlands) Jelle Klaasen
58. (England) Jason Crawley
59. (England) Shaun Griffiths
60. (Republic of Ireland) William O'Connor
61. (England) Arron Monk
62. (England) Chris Thompson
63. (Northern Ireland) John MaGowan
64. (England) Justin Pipe
65. (England) Kirk Shepherd
66. (England) Terry Temple
67. (Netherlands) Roland Scholten
68. (England) Nick Fullwell
69. (Wales) Steve Evans
70. (Republic of Ireland) Shane O'Connor
71. (England) Wayne Mardle
72. (Germany) Jyhan Artut
73. (England) Gary Welding
74. (England) Peter Hudson
75. (England) Matt Jackson
76. (England) Colin Monk
77. (England) Steve Maish
78. (Austria) Mensur Suljović
79. (England) James Richardson
80. (England) Matt Padgett
81. (England) Brian Woods
82. (England) Louis Blundell
83. (Germany) Michael Rosenauer
84. (England) Mick Todd
85. (Wales) Wayne Atwood
86. (England) Martyn Turner
87. (Netherlands) Co Stompé
88. (Northern Ireland) Mickey Mansell
89. (England) Nicky Bache
90. (Belgium) Rocco Maes
91. (England) Mark Jones
92. (England) Geoff Whitworth
93. (Republic of Ireland) John O'Shea
94. (England) Stephen Hardy
95. (England) Steve Hine
96. (England) Peter Manley
97. (England) Reece Robinson
98. (England) Matthew Edgar
99. (Republic of Ireland) Mick McGowan
100. (Netherlands) Mareno Michels
101. (England) Steve Grubb
102. (England) Dave Ladley
103. (England) Mark Stephenson
104. (England) Jimmy Mann
105. (Republic of Ireland) Aodhagan O'Neill
106. (England) Andy Pearce
107. (England) Lee Palfreyman
108. (South Africa) Devon Petersen

=== Rileys qualifiers ===
32 players qualified from Rileys qualifiers held in Rileys Dart Zones across Britain.

- (England) Paul Harvey
- (England) Andy Boulton
- (England) Andrew Gilding
- (Scotland) Jamie Hagan
- (England) Richie Howson
- (England) Darren Hawken
- (England) Curtis Hammond
- (England) Matthew Jordan
- (England) Joe Murnan
- (England) Richard North
- (England) Tony Broughton
- (England) Ian Gleeson
- (England) Steve Douglas
- (England) Jon Bott
- (England) Paul Whitworth
- (England) Stuart Monaghan
- (England) Davey Dodds
- (England) John Bowles
- (England) Dan Butler
- (England) Ian Moss
- (England) Dean Stewart
- (England) Lee Rose
- (England) Steve Werrett
- (England) Chris Jones
- (England) Graham Hollis
- (England) Sam Hill
- (England) Jamie Ellam
- (England) Ben Burton
- (England) Dave Prins
- (Wales) Phil Daniels

=== Speedy qualifiers ===
32 players qualified from Speedy qualifiers held at four venues across Britain from 12 to 15 April.

Bristol

- (England) Charlie Cooper
- (England) Bruce Harrison
- (England) Jon Jukes
- (England) Martin Perring
- (England) Darren Pugh
- (England) Damien Sherwood
- (England) Peter White
- (England) Stuart White

Dartford

- (England) Ian Covill
- (England) Kevin Edwards
- (England) John Keating
- (England) John Kennedy
- (England) Eddy Martin
- (England) Craig Mucklow
- (England) Jamie Robinson
- (England) Conan Whitehead

Stoke-on-Trent

- (England) Colin Appleton
- (England) Andy Beardmore
- (England) Paul Cartwright
- (England) Stuart Daniels
- (England) Robbie Green
- (England) John Jackson
- (England) Kevin Simm
- (England) Brandon Walsh

Glasgow

- (Scotland) Charlie Burns
- (Scotland) John Donaldson
- (England) Gordon Foster
- (Scotland) Kirk Gordon
- (Scotland) Duncan Hastings
- (England) Danny Jones
- (Scotland) Tommy Little
- (Scotland) Ryan Murray

== Prize money ==
For the third consecutive UK Open, the prize fund was £200,000.

Stage (no. of players)		Prize money (Total: £200,000)
Winner	(1)	£40,000
Runner-Up	(1)	£20,000
Semi-finalists	(2)	£10,000
Quarter-finalists	(4)	£6,000
Last 16 (fifth round)	(8)	£4,000
Last 32 (fourth round)	(16)	£2,000
Last 64 (third round)	(32)	£1,000
Last 96 (second round)	(32)	n/a
Last 160 (first round)	(64)	n/a
Last 172 (preliminary round)	(12)	n/a

== Draw ==
The draw for the preliminary, first and second rounds was made on 12 May.

=== Thursday 2 June; best of 7 legs ===
==== Preliminary round ====
Stage 3

Player	Legs	Player
John Donaldson (Scotland)	3 – 4	(England) Dave Prins
Louis Blundell (England)	4 – 0	(Scotland) Duncan Hastings

Stage 4

Player	Legs	Player
Peter White (England)	0 – 4	(Germany) Michael Rosenauer
Curtis Hammond (England)	1 – 4	(England) Bruce Harrison

Stage 5

Player	Legs	Player
Mick Todd (England)	2 – 4	(England) Paul Harvey
Chris Thompson (England)	0 – 4	(England) Nigel Heydon

Stage 6

Player	Legs	Player
Mark Lawrence (England)	3 – 4	(England) Dave Ladley
Phil Daniels (Wales)	4 – 1	(England) Nicky Bache

Stage 7

Player	Legs	Player
Nick Fullwell (England)	4 – 2	(England) Tony Broughton
Eddie Lovely (England)	0 – 4	(England) Michael Barnard

Stage 8

Player	Legs	Player
Wayne Atwood (Wales)	4 – 1	(England) Lee Rose
Eddy Martin (England)	1 – 4	(England) Andy Pearce

==== Round 1 ====
Main Stage

Player	Legs	Player
Scott Rand (England)	2 – 4	(England) Steve Beaton
Mark Stephenson (England)	4 – 1	(England) Ben Burton
Darrin Pugh (England)	0 – 4	(England) Wayne Mardle
Brian Woods (England)	1 – 4	(England) Mark Hylton
Colin Lloyd (England)	4 – 3	(Netherlands) Jelle Klaasen
Peter Manley (England)	2 – 4	(England) John Bowles
Davey Dodds (England)	2 – 4	(England) James Wade
Devon Petersen (South Africa)	4 – 2	(England) Stuart White

Stage 2

Player	Legs	Player
Reece Robinson (England)	4 – 0	(Wales) Barrie Bates
Lee Palfreyman (England)	1 – 4	(Scotland) John Henderson
Mensur Suljović (Austria)	†	(England) Brandon Walsh
John MaGowan (Northern Ireland)	†	(England) Shaun Griffiths
Justin Pipe (England)	4 – 0	(England) Gary Welding
Kirk Shepherd (England)	4 – 1	(England) Paul Cartwright
Steve Grubb (England)	4 – 1	(England) Andy Beardmore
Roland Scholten (Netherlands)	4 – 0	(England) Kevin Edwards

- † Brandon Walsh received a bye as Mensur Suljović was disqualified.
- † Shaun Griffiths received a bye as John MaGowan withdrew due to injury.

Stage 3

Player	Legs	Player
Alex Roy (England)	1 – 4	(Republic of Ireland) John O'Shea
Robbie Green (England)	4 – 2	(England) Steve Clews
Colin Monk (England)	1 – 4	(Scotland) Ryan Murray
James Richardson (England)	0 – 4	(England) Stuart Monaghan
John Kennedy (England)	0 – 4	(England) Steve Werrett
Peter Hudson (England)	4 – 3	(Wales) Steve Evans
Andy Pearce (England)	4 – 1	(England) Matt Jackson
Andy Boulton (England)	4 – 3	(England) Jimmy Mann

Stage 4

Player	Legs	Player
Jamie Ellam (England)	4 – 2	(England) Ian Moss
Mick McGowan (Republic of Ireland)	0 – 4	(England) Andy Smith
Steve Hine (England)	3 – 4	(England) Arron Monk
Ian Covill (England)	4 – 2	(England) Stuart Daniels
Rocco Maes (Belgium)	4 – 0	(England) Colin Appleton
Steve Maish (England)	4 – 3	(England) Martin Perring
Jon Jukes (England)	1 – 4	(England) Dave Prins
Louis Blundell (England)	3 – 4	(Wales) Wayne Atwood

Stage 5

Player	Legs	Player
Mickey Mansell (Northern Ireland)	4 – 0	(England) Gordon Foster
John Jackson (England)	0 – 4	(England) Mark Jones
Bruce Harrison (England)	0 – 4	(England) Tony Eccles
Jason Crawley (England)	3 – 4	(England) Dan Butler
Craig Mucklow (England)	4 – 3	(England) Matt Padgett
Paul Whitworth (England)	3 – 4	(England) Richard North
Michael Rosenauer (Germany)	2 – 4	(England) Jon Bott
Conan Whitehead (England)	4 – 0	(England) Charlie Cooper

Stage 6

Player	Legs	Player
Mareno Michels (Netherlands)	1 – 4	(Spain) Antonio Alcinas
Tony Ayres (England)	4 – 1	(Germany) Jyhan Artut
Stephen Hardy (England)	2 – 4	(England) Richie Howson
Danny Jones (England)	0 – 4	(England) Chris Jones
Joe Murnan (England)	4 – 3	(England) Damien Sherwood
John Keating (England)	0 – 4	(England) Steve Douglas
Paul Harvey (England)	4 – 0	(Scotland) Charlie Burns
Matthew Edgar (England)	4 – 2	(England) Nigel Heydon

Stage 7

Player	Legs	Player
Dean Stewart (England)	0 – 4	(Netherlands) Michael van Gerwen
Martyn Turner (England)	4 – 0	(Scotland) Tommy Little
Matt Clark (England)	4 – 3	(Scotland) Jamie Hagen
Darren Hawken (England)	1 – 4	(Republic of Ireland) William O'Connor
Dennis Priestley (England)	4 – 3	(England) Dave Ladley
Phil Daniels (Wales)	2 – 4	(Scotland) Peter Wright
Magnus Caris (Sweden)	4 – 2	(England) Kevin McDine
Ian Gleeson (England)	4 – 0	(Scotland) Kirk Gordon

Stage 8

Player	Legs	Player
Geoff Whitworth (England)	4 – 1	(England) Kevin Simm
Terry Temple (England)	0 – 4	(Netherlands) Co Stompé
Michael Barnard (England)	0 – 4	(England) Jamie Robinson
Matthew Jordan (England)	3 – 4	(England) Graham Hollis
Shane O'Connor (Republic of Ireland)	4 – 3	(England) Chris Aubrey
Sam Hill (England)	4 – 3	(Republic of Ireland) Aodhagan O'Neill
Dennis Smith (England)	1 – 4	(England) Nick Fullwell
Brendan Dolan (Northern Ireland)	0 – 4	(England) Andrew Gilding

==== Round 2 ====
Main Stage

Player	Legs	Player
John Henderson (Scotland)	4 – 1	(England) Ian Covill
Mickey Mansell (Northern Ireland)	4 – 0	(Spain) Antonio Alcinas
Shane O'Connor (Republic of Ireland)	2 – 4	(Netherlands) Michael van Gerwen
Peter Hudson (England)	4 – 3	(Sweden) Magnus Caris

Stage 2

Player	Legs	Player
Geoff Whitworth (England)	1 – 4	(England) Mark Hylton
Co Stompé (Netherlands)	4 – 3	(England) Chris Jones
Martyn Turner (England)	4 – 2	(Scotland) Ryan Murray
Andrew Gilding (England)	4 – 2	(England) Matt Clark

Stage 3

Player	Legs	Player
William O'Connor (Republic of Ireland)	1 – 4	(England) Sam Hill
Craig Mucklow (England)	0 – 4	(England) Andy Smith
James Wade (England)	4 – 2	(England) Dave Prins
Ian Gleeson (England)	3 – 4	(England) Mark Jones

Stage 4

Player	Legs	Player
Steve Werrett (England)	2 – 4	(England) Steve Beaton
Robbie Green (England)	2 – 4	(England) Dennis Priestley
John O'Shea (Republic of Ireland)	1 – 4	(England) Justin Pipe
Reece Robinson (England)	4 – 0	(England) Wayne Mardle

Stage 5

Player	Legs	Player
Stuart Monaghan (England)	4 – 2	(England) Jamie Robinson
Steve Douglas (England)	0 – 4	(England) Joe Murnan
Mark Stephenson (England)	2 – 4	(England) Steve Maish
Roland Scholten (Netherlands)	4 – 1	(England) Nick Fullwell

Stage 6

Player	Legs	Player
Graham Hollis (England)	4 – 1	(England) Jamie Ellam
Richard North (England)	4 – 0	(England) Dan Butler
Jon Bott (England)	1 – 4	(England) Andy Boulton
Conan Whitehead (England)	2 – 4	(Wales) Wayne Atwood

Stage 7

Player	Legs	Player
Tony Ayres (England)	0 – 4	(England) Richie Howson
Rocco Maes (Belgium)	0 – 4	(England) Kirk Shepherd
Devon Petersen (South Africa)	3 – 4	(England) John Bowles
Andy Pearce (England)	1 – 4	(England) Matthew Edgar

Stage 8

Player	Legs	Player
Colin Lloyd (England)	4 – 2	(England) Arron Monk
Steve Grubb (England)	0 – 4	(Scotland) Peter Wright
Shaun Griffiths (England)	0 – 4	(England) Tony Eccles
Brandon Walsh (England)	0 – 4	(England) Paul Harvey

=== Friday 3 June; best of 17 legs ===
==== Round 3 ====
Draw made after Round 2 matches

Main Stage

Player	Legs	Player
Co Stompé (Netherlands)	9 – 7	(Australia) Simon Whitlock
Steve Brown (England)	5 – 9	(Netherlands) Raymond van Barneveld
Phil Taylor (England)	9 – 3	(England) Mark Frost
Terry Jenkins (England)	9 – 7	(England) Adrian Lewis

Stage 2

Player	Legs	Player
Mervyn King (England)	5 – 9	(England) Mark Walsh
Ian White (England)	4 – 9	(Scotland) Gary Anderson
Roland Scholten (Netherlands)	2 – 9	(Canada) John Part
Richie Burnett (Wales)	9 – 7	(England) Colin Lloyd

Stage 3

Player	Legs	Player
Darren Johnson (England)	6 – 9	(England) Kirk Shepherd
Richard North (England)	2 – 9	(England) Dave Chisnall
Justin Pipe (England)	7 – 9	(England) John Bowles
Robert Thornton (Scotland)	9 – 6	(Wales) Wayne Atwood

Stage 4

Player	Legs	Player
Andy Hamilton (England)	6 – 9	(England) Andrew Gilding
Andy Jenkins (England)	0 – 9	(England) Mark Hylton
Wes Newton (England)	9 – 3	(Scotland) John Henderson
Colin Osborne (England)	9 – 4	(England) Mark Jones

Stage 5

Player	Legs	Player
Sam Hill (England)	2 – 9	(England) Michael Smith
Denis Ovens (England)	9 – 4	(England) Kevin Painter
Vincent van der Voort (Netherlands)	7 – 9	(England) Andy Boulton
Mark Dudbridge (England)	8 – 9	(England) Joe Murnan

Stage 6

Player	Legs	Player
Wayne Jones (England)	8 – 9	(England) Reece Robinson
Joe Cullen (England)	9 – 8	(England) Stuart Monaghan
Alan Tabern (England)	7 – 9	(England) Dennis Priestley
Martyn Turner (England)	6 – 9	(England) Matthew Edgar

Stage 7

Player	Legs	Player
Mark Webster (Wales)	9 – 5	(England) Tony Eccles
James Wade (England)	9 – 2	(Northern Ireland) Mickey Mansell
Richie Howson (England)	2 – 9	(Netherlands) Michael van Gerwen
Jamie Caven (England)	2 – 9	(England) Steve Beaton

Stage 8

Player	Legs	Player
Steve Maish (England)	6 – 9	(England) Ronnie Baxter
Peter Wright (Scotland)	9 – 1	(England) Peter Hudson
Graham Hollis (England)	3 – 9	(Australia) Paul Nicholson
Paul Harvey (England)	4 – 9	(England) Andy Smith

=== Saturday 4 June; best of 17 legs ===
==== Afternoon – Round 4 ====
Draw made after Round 3 matches.

Main Stage

Player	Legs	Player
Paul Nicholson (Australia)	9 – 8	(Scotland) Gary Anderson
Dennis Priestley (England)	3 – 9	(England) Phil Taylor
Terry Jenkins (England)	6 – 9	(England) James Wade
Dave Chisnall (England)	9 – 7	(England) Ronnie Baxter

Stage 2

Player	Legs	Player
Michael van Gerwen (Netherlands)	3 – 9	(England) Wes Newton
Andy Smith (England)	9 – 8	(England) Reece Robinson
Michael Smith (England)	4 – 9	(Netherlands) Raymond van Barneveld
Mark Webster (Wales)	9 – 8	(Netherlands) Co Stompé

Stage 3

Player	Legs	Player
Richie Burnett (Wales)	9 – 6	(England) Joe Murnan
Denis Ovens (England)	9 – 4	(England) Mark Walsh
Robert Thornton (Scotland)	9 – 8	(Canada) John Part
Colin Osborne (England)	9 – 7	(England) Kirk Shepherd

Stage 4

Player	Legs	Player
Matthew Edgar (England)	5 – 9	(England) Andy Boulton
Mark Hylton (England)	9 – 2	(England) Andrew Gilding
Steve Beaton (England)	8 – 9	(England) John Bowles
Joe Cullen (England)	5 – 9	(Scotland) Peter Wright

==== Evening – Round 5 ====
Draw made after Round 4 matches

Main Stage

Player	Legs	Player
Richie Burnett (Wales)	7 – 9	(England) James Wade
Robert Thornton (Scotland)	9 – 7	(England) Colin Osborne
Phil Taylor (England)	8 – 9	(Australia) Paul Nicholson
Raymond van Barneveld (Netherlands)	1 – 9	(England) Wes Newton

Stage 2

Player	Legs	Player
Peter Wright (Scotland)	7 – 9	(England) Mark Hylton
Andy Boulton (England)	4 – 9	(Wales) Mark Webster
Andy Smith (England)	6 – 9	(England) Denis Ovens
John Bowles (England)	4 – 9	(England) Dave Chisnall

=== Sunday 5 June ===
These matches took place on the main stage.

==== Afternoon – Quarter-finals; best of 19 legs ====
Draw made after Round 5 matches.

Player	Legs	Player
(99.29) Denis Ovens (England)	10–6	(England) Mark Hylton (98.88)
(93.42) Robert Thornton (Scotland)	7–10	(Wales) Mark Webster (95.00)
(95.63) Dave Chisnall (England)	8–10	(England) Wes Newton (94.56)
(95.56) James Wade (England)	10–7	(Australia) Paul Nicholson (92.94)

==== Evening – Final 4 ====
Draw made after the Quarter-finals.

Semi-finals; Best of 19 legs
(England) James Wade (97.63)	10
(Wales) Mark Webster (96.09)	9
(England) Wes Newton (94.55)	10
(England) Denis Ovens (88.75)	6

Final; Best of 21 legs
(England) James Wade (96.25)	11
(England) Wes Newton (88.51)	8

== See also ==
- UK Open history of event and previous winners
- 2011 in darts includes extended results of Pro Tour events
- PDC Pro Tour history of PDC "floor events"
