= 2011 PDC Pro Tour =

The 2011 PDC Pro Tour was a series of non-televised darts tournaments organised by the Professional Darts Corporation (PDC). They were the Professional Dart Players Association (PDPA) Players Championships and the UK Open Qualifiers. This year there were 39 PDC Pro Tour events – 31 Players Championships and 8 UK Open Qualifiers.

== Prize money ==
Prize money for each Players Championship and UK Open Qualifier increased from £31,200 in 2010 to £34,600 in 2011.

Stage	PC/UKQ	YT
Winner	£6,000	£600
Runner-up	£3,000	£400
Semi-finalists	£2,000	£200
Quarter-finalists	£1,000	£100
Last 16	£600	£25
Last 32	£400	N/A
Last 64	£200	N/A
Total	£34,600	£2,000

In addition, £400 per Pro Tour event was reserved for a nine-dart finish. Should this not be won in an event, it was carried over to the next event, and so on until a nine-dart finish was achieved. Once the prize fund was won, it reverted to £400 for the next event.

== PDC Pro Tour Card ==
From 2011, the PDC Pro Tour operates a Tour Card system. 128 players are granted Tour Cards, which enables them to participate in all Players Championships and UK Open Qualifiers.

=== Tour cards ===
The 2011 Tour Cards were awarded to:

- 101 players from the PDC Order of Merit after the 2011 World Championship
- 2 finalists from the 2010 PDC Women's World Championship
- 25 qualifiers from a four-day Qualifying School in Wigan (4 semi-finalists from each day, plus the top 9 players from the Q School Order of Merit)

Tour Cards were also offered to the four semi-finalists from the 2011 BDO World Championship, although none of the players took up the offer.

=== Q School ===
The PDC Pro Tour Qualifying School took place at the Robin Park Tennis Centre in Wigan from January 13–16.

January 13	January 14	January 15	January 16
(England) James Richardson (Republic of Ireland) Shane O'Connor (England) Shaun Griffiths (England) Dave Chisnall	(South Africa) Devon Petersen (Germany) Michael Rosenauer (England) Brian Woods (Sweden) Magnus Caris	(England) Matt Jackson (Gibraltar) Dyson Parody (Northern Ireland) Mickey Mansell (Scotland) John Henderson	(England) Mick Todd (England) Peter Hudson (England) Ian Jopling (India) Prakash Jiwa

A Q School Order of Merit was also created by using the following points system:

Stage	Points
Last 8	9
Last 16	5
Last 32	3
Last 64	2
Last 128	1

To complete the field of 128 Tour Card Holders, places were allocated down the final Qualifying School Order of Merit. The following players picked up Tour Cards as a result:

1. (England) Andy Brown
2. (England) Adam Smith-Neale
3. (England) Mark Jodrill
4. (England) Jason Crawley
5. (England) Terry Temple
6. (England) Mark Jones
7. (England) Ken Dobson
8. (England) Jimmy Mann
9. (England) Paul Rowley

== Players Championships ==
(All matches – best of 11 legs)

=== Players Championship 1 ===
- PDPA Players Championship 1 was contested at the Gerry Weber Centre, Halle on 29 January.

Quarter-finals
1	(Australia) Simon Whitlock	6
(Netherlands) Raymond van Barneveld	1
(Republic of Ireland) William O'Connor	1
13	(England) Mervyn King	6
18	(England) Colin Osborne	5
7	(Netherlands) Vincent van der Voort	6
(Scotland) John Henderson	6
19	(England) Andy Smith	5

Semi-finals
1	(Australia) Simon Whitlock	3
13	(England) Mervyn King	6
7	(Netherlands) Vincent van der Voort	6
(Scotland) John Henderson	4

Final
13	(England) Mervyn King	6
7	(Netherlands) Vincent van der Voort	1

=== Players Championship 2 ===
- PDPA Players Championship 2 was contested at the Gerry Weber Centre, Halle on 30 January.

Quarter-finals
17	(England) Alan Tabern	4
8	(England) Ronnie Baxter	6
29	(England) Nigel Heydon	3
5	(England) Mark Walsh	6
(Spain) Antonio Alcinas	6
(Scotland) John Henderson	5
3	(England) Phil Taylor	4
11	(England) Denis Ovens	6

Semi-finals
8	(England) Ronnie Baxter	6
5	(England) Mark Walsh	2
(Spain) Antonio Alcinas	6
11	(England) Denis Ovens	3

Final
8	(England) Ronnie Baxter	6
(Spain) Antonio Alcinas	4

=== Players Championship 3 ===
- PDPA Players Championship 3 was contested at the Moorways Centre, Derby on 19 February.

Quarter-finals
32	(Australia) Paul Nicholson	4
9	(England) Adrian Lewis	6
4	(England) Wes Newton	6
(Gibraltar) Dyson Parody	3
18	(England) Dennis Priestley	5
7	(England) Ronnie Baxter	6
(England) Dave Chisnall	3
6	(England) Jamie Caven	6

Semi-finals
9	(England) Adrian Lewis	6
4	(England) Wes Newton	4
7	(England) Ronnie Baxter	2
6	(England) Jamie Caven	6

Final
9	(England) Adrian Lewis	2
6	(England) Jamie Caven	6

=== Players Championship 4 ===
- PDPA Players Championship 4 was contested at the Moorways Centre, Derby on 20 February.

Quarter-finals
17	(England) Mervyn King	6
(England) Scott Rand	3
Brendan Dolan	1
5	(England) Mark Walsh	6
2	(England) Wes Newton	6
(England) Dave Chisnall	4
3	(England) Jamie Caven	2
(Canada) John Part	6

Semi-finals
17	(England) Mervyn King	5
5	(England) Mark Walsh	6
2	(England) Wes Newton	2
(Canada) John Part	6

Final
5	(England) Mark Walsh	0
(Canada) John Part	6

=== Players Championship 5 ===
- PDPA Players Championship 5 was contested at the K2 Centre, Crawley on 26 March.

Quarter-finals
(Germany) Michael Rosenauer	2
24	(Australia) Paul Nicholson	6
4	(Scotland) Gary Anderson	6
5	(England) Mark Walsh	5
2	(England) Wes Newton	3
10	(England) Adrian Lewis	6
(Republic of Ireland) William O'Connor	3
6	(England) Ronnie Baxter	6

Semi-finals
24	(Australia) Paul Nicholson	6
4	(Scotland) Gary Anderson	5
10	(England) Adrian Lewis	6
6	(England) Ronnie Baxter	5

Final
24	(Australia) Paul Nicholson	6
10	(England) Adrian Lewis	4

=== Players Championship 6 ===
- PDPA Players Championship 6 Crawley at the K2 Centre, Crawley on 27 March.

Quarter-finals		Semi-finals		Final
(England) Justin Pipe	6
(Scotland) Peter Wright	3	(England) Justin Pipe	4
(Australia) Paul Nicholson	6	(Australia) Paul Nicholson	6
(England) Mark Walsh	1			(Australia) Paul Nicholson	4
(England) Wes Newton	6			(England) Wes Newton	6
(Netherlands) Vincent van der Voort	2	(England) Wes Newton	6
(Scotland) Gary Anderson	6	(Scotland) Gary Anderson	3
(England) Wayne Jones	4

=== Players Championship 7 ===
- Austrian Open Players Championship 7 at Wiener Neustadt, Vienna on 14 May.

Quarter-finals		Semi-finals		Final
(Belgium) Kim Huybrechts	6
(England) Kevin Painter	0	(Belgium) Kim Huybrechts	5
(England) Denis Ovens	6	(England) Denis Ovens	6
(England) Mark Hylton	3			(England) Denis Ovens	0
(Scotland) Peter Wright	6			(Canada) John Part	6
(England) Scott Rand	3	(Scotland) Peter Wright	4
(Canada) John Part	6	(Canada) John Part	6
(Austria) Mensur Suljović	1

=== Players Championship 8 ===
- Austrian Open Players Championship 8 at Wiener Neustadt, Vienna on 15 May.

Quarter-finals		Semi-finals		Final
(Netherlands) Vincent van der Voort	6
(England) Andy Smith	5	(Netherlands) Vincent van der Voort	6
(England) Mark Hylton	6	(England) Mark Hylton	4
(Canada) John Part	1			(Netherlands) Vincent van der Voort	6
(England) Phil Taylor	6			(England) Phil Taylor	5
(Northern Ireland) Brendan Dolan	1	(England) Phil Taylor	6
(England) Justin Pipe	6	(England) Justin Pipe	2
(England) Andy Hamilton	4

=== Players Championship 9 ===
- PDPA Players Championship 9 was contested at the K2 Centre, Crawley on 21 May.

Quarter-finals		Semi-finals		Final
(England) Terry Jenkins	6
(England) Wes Newton	1	(England) Terry Jenkins	6
(Australia) Simon Whitlock	6	(Australia) Simon Whitlock	3
(Canada) John Part	5			(England) Terry Jenkins	3
(Scotland) Gary Anderson	6			(Scotland) Gary Anderson	6
(England) Wayne Jones	2	(Scotland) Gary Anderson	6
(England) Alan Tabern	6	(England) Alan Tabern	3
(Scotland) Peter Wright	4

=== Players Championship 10 ===
- PDPA Players Championship 10 was contested at the K2 Centre, Crawley on 22 May.

Quarter-finals		Semi-finals		Final
(England) Terry Jenkins	6
(Wales) Mark Webster	5	(England) Terry Jenkins	6
(England) Scott Rand	6	(England) Scott Rand	4
(Scotland) John Henderson	2			(England) Terry Jenkins	3
(England) Wes Newton	6			(Australia) Paul Nicholson	6
(Netherlands) Vincent van der Voort	4	(England) Wes Newton	5
(Australia) Paul Nicholson	6	(Australia) Paul Nicholson	6
(England) Steve Brown	5

=== Players Championship 11 ===
- Eddie Cox Memorial Players Championship 11 at the Metrodome, Barnsley on 11 June.

Quarter-finals		Semi-finals		Final
(Australia) Paul Nicholson	6
(England) Mervyn King	1	(Australia) Paul Nicholson	6
(England) Dave Chisnall	6	(England) Dave Chisnall	5
(Canada) John Part	2			(Australia) Paul Nicholson	6
(England) Steve Brown	6			(England) Steve Brown	4
(England) Brian Woods	5	(England) Steve Brown	6
(England) Justin Pipe	6	(England) Justin Pipe	5
(Scotland) Robert Thornton	1

=== Players Championship 12 ===
- Bobby Bourn Memorial Players Championship 12 at the Metrodome, Barnsley on 12 June.

Quarter-finals		Semi-finals		Final
(England) Dave Chisnall	6
(England) Wayne Jones	3	(England) Dave Chisnall	6
(England) Mark Hylton	6	(England) Mark Hylton	5
(England) Steve Beaton	5			(England) Dave Chisnall	2
(England) Andy Smith	6			(England) Andy Smith	6
(Scotland) Gary Anderson	1	(England) Andy Smith	6
(England) James Wade	6	(England) James Wade	3
(Canada) John Part	3

=== Players Championship 13 ===
- Dutch Darts Trophy Players Championship 13 at Nuland, Netherlands on 18 June.

Quarter-finals
1	(England) Wes Newton	6
(Netherlands) Michael van Gerwen	3
5	(England) Mark Walsh	6
29	(Scotland) Peter Wright	0
2	(Australia) Simon Whitlock	6
23	(England) Colin Osborne	5
3	(Scotland) Gary Anderson	6
6	(Netherlands) Vincent van der Voort	4

Semi-finals
1	(England) Wes Newton	6
5	(England) Mark Walsh	3
2	(Australia) Simon Whitlock	5
3	(Scotland) Gary Anderson	6

Final
1	(England) Wes Newton	5
3	(Scotland) Gary Anderson	6

=== Players Championship 14 ===
- Dutch Darts Trophy Players Championship 14 at Nuland, Netherlands on 19 June.

Quarter-finals		Semi-finals		Final
(Netherlands) Vincent van der Voort	6
(England) Kevin Painter	2	(Netherlands) Vincent van der Voort	5
(England) Andy Smith	6	(England) Andy Smith	6
(England) Colin Osborne	3			(England) Andy Smith	3
(Scotland) Gary Anderson	6			(Scotland) Gary Anderson	6
(England) Dennis Smith	5	(Scotland) Gary Anderson	6
(Australia) Simon Whitlock	6	(Australia) Simon Whitlock	2
(England) Steve Beaton	4

=== Players Championship 15 ===
- PDPA Players Championship 15 was contested in Ontario, Canada on 27 August. The tournament was won by John Part who defeated Wes Newton 6–4 in the final.

Quarter-finals		Semi-finals		Final
(England) Wes Newton	6
(England) Justin Pipe	5	(England) Wes Newton	6
(England) Denis Ovens	6	(England) Denis Ovens	3
(England) Steve Beaton	2			(England) Wes Newton	4
(Canada) John Part	6			(Canada) John Part	6
(Scotland) Peter Wright	4	(Canada) John Part	6
(England) Jamie Caven	6	(England) Jamie Caven	4
(England) Colin Lloyd	2

=== Players Championship 16 ===
- Canadian Masters Players Championships 16 at Ontario, Canada on 28 August

Quarter-finals		Semi-finals		Final
(Netherlands) Michael van Gerwen	6
(England) Justin Pipe	3	(Netherlands) Michael van Gerwen	4
(England) Ronnie Baxter	6	(England) Ronnie Baxter	6
(Canada) Norm Tremblay	1			(England) Ronnie Baxter	6
(England) Kevin Painter	6			(England) Kevin Painter	2
(Australia) Simon Whitlock	5	(England) Kevin Painter	6
(Netherlands) Co Stompé	6	(Netherlands) Co Stompé	3
(Canada) John Part	5

=== Players Championship 17 ===
- PDPA Players Championship 17 was contested at the Moorways Centre, Derby on 3 September.

Quarter-finals		Semi-finals		Final
(Netherlands) Raymond van Barneveld	6
(England) Steve Farmer	5	(Netherlands) Raymond van Barneveld	6
(Australia) Paul Nicholson	6	(Australia) Paul Nicholson	4
(England) Kevin Painter	3			(Netherlands) Raymond van Barneveld	6
(Canada) John Part	6			(Canada) John Part	2
(Scotland) Gary Anderson	3	(Canada) John Part	6
(Australia) Simon Whitlock	6	(Australia) Simon Whitlock	5
(England) Justin Pipe	1

=== Players Championship 18 ===
- PDPA Players Championship 18 was contested at the Moorways Centre, Derby on 4 September.

Quarter-finals		Semi-finals		Final
(Scotland) Peter Wright	6
(England) Wes Newton	2	(Scotland) Peter Wright	6
(Australia) Paul Nicholson	6	(Australia) Paul Nicholson	5
(England) Kirk Shepherd	1			(Scotland) Peter Wright	2
(Scotland) Gary Anderson	6			(Scotland) Gary Anderson	6
(Wales) Mark Webster	2	(Scotland) Gary Anderson	6
(Canada) John Part	6	(Canada) John Part	5
(England) Nigel Heydon	4

=== Players Championship 19 ===
- PDPA Players Championship 19 was contested in Nuland, Netherlands on 24 September.

Quarter-finals		Semi-finals		Final
(Scotland) Gary Anderson	6
(Wales) Mark Webster	1	(Scotland) Gary Anderson	6
(England) Tony Ayres	6	(England) Tony Ayres	0
(England) Mark Walsh	5			(Scotland) Gary Anderson	6
(England) Colin Lloyd	6			(England) Colin Lloyd	2
(England) Dave Chisnall	5	(England) Colin Lloyd	6
(England) Scott Rand	6	(England) Scott Rand	4
(Northern Ireland) Brendan Dolan	3

=== Players Championship 20 ===
- PDPA Players Championship 20 was contested in Nuland, Netherlands on 25 September.

Quarter-finals		Semi-finals		Final
(England) Dave Chisnall	6
(England) Nigel Heydon	3	(England) Dave Chisnall	6
(Belgium) Kurt van de Rijk	6	(Belgium) Kurt van de Rijk	0
(Wales) Steve Evans	2			(England) Dave Chisnall	4
(Wales) Mark Webster	6			(Wales) Richie Burnett	6
(England) Michael Smith	2	(Wales) Mark Webster	2
(Wales) Richie Burnett	6	(Wales) Richie Burnett	6
(England) Kevin Painter	5

=== Players Championship 21 ===
- PDPA Players Championship 21 Ireland at the New Citywest Convention Centre, Dublin on 1 October

Quarter-finals		Semi-finals		Final
(Netherlands) Michael van Gerwen	6
(Scotland) Gary Anderson	5	(Netherlands) Michael van Gerwen	6
(England) Mervyn King	6	(England) Mervyn King	3
(England) Nigel Heydon	3			(Netherlands) Michael van Gerwen	3
(England) Scott Rand	6			(England) Phil Taylor	6
(Netherlands) Vincent van der Voort	3	(England) Scott Rand	2
(England) Phil Taylor	6	(England) Phil Taylor	6
(England) Justin Pipe	5

=== Players Championship 22 ===
- PDPA Players Championship 22 Ireland at the New Citywest Convention Centre, Dublin on 2 October

Quarter-finals		Semi-finals		Final
(Scotland) Gary Anderson	6
(England) Jamie Caven	5	(Scotland) Gary Anderson	4
(England) Justin Pipe	6	(England) Justin Pipe	6
(England) Steve Beaton	4			(England) Justin Pipe	6
(England) Wes Newton	6			(England) Phil Taylor	5
(Netherlands) Vincent van der Voort	3	(England) Wes Newton	2
(England) Phil Taylor	6	(England) Phil Taylor	6
(Australia) Paul Nicholson	3

=== Players Championship 23 ===
- John McEvoy Gold Dart Classic Players Championship 23 at the National Event Centre, Killarney on 16 October

Quarter-finals			Semi-finals			Final
1	Gary Anderson	6
24	(England) Andy Hamilton	1	1	Gary Anderson	6
20	(England) Mark Hylton	6	20	(England) Mark Hylton	3
21	(England) Wayne Jones	3				1	Gary Anderson	5
18	(England) Scott Rand	3				7	(England) Justin Pipe	6
7	(England) Justin Pipe	6	7	(England) Justin Pipe	6
3	(Australia) Paul Nicholson	6	3	(Australia) Paul Nicholson	5
6	(Australia) Simon Whitlock	5

=== Players Championship 24 ===
- German Darts Classic Players Championship 24 at the Van Der Valk Hotel, Gladbeck on 22 October

Quarter-finals
32	(England) James Wade	6
25	John Henderson	3
13	(England) Colin Lloyd	3
12	Mervyn King	6
18	(England) Mark Hylton	5
(Germany) Jyhan Artut	6
3	(England) Justin Pipe	6
6	(Australia) Simon Whitlock	2

Semi-finals
32	(England) James Wade	6
12	Mervyn King	5
(Germany) Jyhan Artut	2
3	(England) Justin Pipe	6

Final
32	(England) James Wade	6
3	(England) Justin Pipe	3

=== Players Championship 25 ===
- German Darts Classic Players Championship 25 at the Van Der Valk Hotel, Gladbeck on 23 October

Quarter-finals
(England) Chris Aubrey	2
25	(England) Colin Osborne	6
4	(England) Mark Walsh	6
28	Michael van Gerwen	5
2	Paul Nicholson	6
7	(England) Jamie Caven	4
30	(England) Steve Farmer	4
James Richardson	6

Semi-finals
25	(England) Colin Osborne	6
4	(England) Mark Walsh	2
2	Paul Nicholson	3
James Richardson	6

Final
25	(England) Colin Osborne	6
James Richardson	2

=== Players Championship 26 ===
- Spanish Darts Trophy Players Championship 26 at the Hotel Melia Benidorm, Alicante on 29 October

Quarter-finals			Semi-finals			Final
17	(England) Dave Chisnall	6
8	(Australia) Simon Whitlock	2	17	(England) Dave Chisnall	4
20	(England) James Wade	6	20	(England) James Wade	6
12	(Wales) Mark Webster	5				20	(England) James Wade	6
31	Raymond van Barneveld	6				31	Raymond van Barneveld	2
7	Vincent van der Voort	1	31	Raymond van Barneveld	6
30	(England) Nigel Heydon	5	6	(England) Phil Taylor	5
6	(England) Phil Taylor	6

=== Players Championship 27 ===
- Spanish Darts Trophy Players Championship 27 at the Hotel Melia Benidorm, Alicante on 30 October

Quarter-finals			Semi-finals			Final
1	(Scotland) Gary Anderson	4
9	(England) Jamie Caven	5	9	(England) Jamie Caven	2
13	(England) Colin Osborne	3	12	(England) Mervyn King	6
12	(England) Mervyn King	6				12	(England) Mervyn King	6
2	(England) Wes Newton	6				2	(England) Wes Newton	3
10	(Wales) Mark Webster	2	2	(England) Wes Newton	6
14	(Scotland) Peter Wright	5	27	Raymond van Barneveld	3
27	Raymond van Barneveld	6

=== Players Championship 28 ===
- PDPA Players Championship 28 was contested at the K2 Centre, Crawley on 5 November. Justin Pipe won his third Players Championship title by defeating Vincent van der Voort 6–3 in the final.

Quarter-finals
1	(England) Wes Newton	1
8	(Netherlands) Vincent van der Voort	6
29	(Netherlands) Co Stompé	6
12	(England) Colin Osborne	2
(England) Matt Clark	6
(England) Ian White	3
3	(England) Justin Pipe	6
11	(Wales) Mark Webster	1

Semi-finals
8	(Netherlands) Vincent van der Voort	6
29	(Netherlands) Co Stompé	4
(England) Matt Clark	3
3	(England) Justin Pipe	6

Final
8	(Netherlands) Vincent van der Voort	4
3	(England) Justin Pipe	6

=== Players Championship 29 ===
- PDPA Players Championship 29 was contested at the K2 Centre, Crawley on 6 November

Quarter-finals
1	(England) Justin Pipe	6
(Belgium) Kim Huybrechts	4
4	(Canada) John Part	4
(Northern Ireland) Brendan Dolan	6
15	(England) Dave Chisnall	6
(England) Arron Monk	1
19	(England) Steve Beaton	3
27	(Netherlands) Co Stompé	6

Semi-finals
1	(England) Justin Pipe	6
(Northern Ireland) Brendan Dolan	0
15	(England) Dave Chisnall	6
27	(Netherlands) Co Stompé	5

Final
1	(England) Justin Pipe	4
15	(England) Dave Chisnall	6

=== Players Championship 30 ===
- PDPA Players Championship 30 was contested at the Robin Park Tennis Centre, Wigan on 26 November

Quarter-finals			Semi-finals			Final
16	(Wales) Mark Webster	6
9	(England) Dave Chisnall	5	16	(Wales) Mark Webster	2
13	(Scotland) Peter Wright	2	5	(England) Ronnie Baxter	6
5	(England) Ronnie Baxter	6				5	(England) Ronnie Baxter	1
15	(England) Denis Ovens	3				7	(England) Phil Taylor	6
7	(England) Phil Taylor	6	7	(England) Phil Taylor	6
19	(England) Steve Beaton	6	19	(England) Steve Beaton	0
27	(Netherlands) Michael van Gerwen	5

=== Players Championship 31 ===
- PDPA Players Championship 31 was contested at the Robin Park Tennis Centre, Wigan on 27 November

Quarter-finals			Semi-finals			Final
1	(England) Justin Pipe	6
9	(England) Dave Chisnall	3	1	(England) Justin Pipe	6
29	(England) Adrian Lewis	6	29	(England) Adrian Lewis	1
12	(Scotland) Peter Wright	5				1	(England) Justin Pipe	4
15	(England) Steve Beaton	2				7	(England) Phil Taylor	6
7	(England) Phil Taylor	6	7	(England) Phil Taylor	6
3	(England) Wes Newton	6	3	(England) Wes Newton	1
22	(England) Terry Jenkins	5

== PDC Youth Tour ==
In 2011, the PDC established the PDC Unicorn Youth Tour – a series of 15 events open to players aged between 14 and 21. The top 28 players from the Youth Tour Order of Merit qualified for the 2012 PDC World Youth Championship.

No.	Date	Venue	Winner	Legs	Runner-up	Ref.
1	Saturday 19 February	(England) Derby	Adam Hunt (England)	4–2	(England) Josh Jones	
2	Saturday 26 February	(England) Barnsley	Shaun Griffiths (England)	4–2	(England) Michael Smith	
3	Saturday 12 March	(England) Wigan	Ryan Harrington (England)	4–2	(England) Steve Haggerty	
4	Saturday 26 March	(England) Crawley	Paul Barham (England)	4–2	(England) Chris Aubrey	
5	Saturday 16 April	(England) Barnsley	Ricky Evans (England)	4–1	(Republic of Ireland) David Coyne	
6	Saturday 30 April	(England) Wigan	Michael van Gerwen (Netherlands)	4–0	(England) Ash Khayat	
7	Saturday 14 May	(Austria) Vienna	Joe Cullen (England)	4–2	(England) Paul Barham	
8	Saturday 21 May	(England) Crawley	Michael van Gerwen (Netherlands)	4–1	(Netherlands) Co Stompé, Jr	
9	Saturday 11 June	(England) Barnsley	Reece Robinson (England)	4–0	(England) Shaun Griffiths	
10	Saturday 18 June	(Netherlands) Nuland	Joe Cullen (England)	4–2	(Netherlands) Gino Vos	
11	Saturday 3 September	(England) Derby	Michael van Gerwen (Netherlands)	4–1	(England) Michael Smith	
12	Saturday 24 September	(Netherlands) Nuland	Paul Barham (England)	4–3	(Netherlands) Willem Mandigers	
13	Saturday 1 October	(Republic of Ireland) Dublin	Joe Cullen (England)	4–3	(England) Michael Smith	
14	Saturday 15 October	(Republic of Ireland) Killarney	Michael van Gerwen (Netherlands)	4–2	(England) Joe Cullen	
15	Saturday 22 October	(Germany) Gladbeck	Paul Barham (England)	4–1	(Netherlands) Dirk van Duijvenbode	

== UK Open Qualifiers ==
No.	Date	Venue	Winner	Legs	Runner-up
1	Saturday 26 February	Barnsley Metrodome, Barnsley	Steve Brown (England)	6 – 3	(England) Ian White
2	Sunday 27 February	Barnsley Metrodome, Barnsley	Michael Smith (England)	6 – 5	(England) Dave Chisnall
3	Saturday 12 March	Robin Park Tennis Centre, Wigan	Adrian Lewis (England)	6 – 4	(Scotland) Robert Thornton
4	Sunday 13 March	Robin Park Tennis Centre, Wigan	Vincent van der Voort (Netherlands)	6 – 4	(Netherlands) Raymond van Barneveld
5	Saturday 16 April	Barnsley Metrodome, Barnsley	Gary Anderson (Scotland)	6 – 4	(England) Phil Taylor
6	Sunday 17 April	Barnsley Metrodome, Barnsley	Phil Taylor (England)	6 – 1	(England) Joe Cullen
7	Saturday 30 April	Robin Park Tennis Centre, Wigan	Gary Anderson (Scotland)	6 – 2	(England) Phil Taylor
8	Sunday 1 May	Robin Park Tennis Centre, Wigan	Phil Taylor (England)	6 – 3	(England) Colin Osborne

== Australian Grand Prix Pro Tour ==
The Australian Grand Prix rankings are calculated from events across Australia. The top player in the rankings automatically qualifies for the 2012 World Championship.

No.	Date	Also known as	Winner	Legs	Runner-up	Ref.
1	Saturday 22 January	Revesby Workers Club Open 1	Arnel Galvez (Australia)	6–4	(Australia) Steve Duke	
2	Sunday 23 January	Revesby Workers Club Open 2	Bill Aitken (Australia)	6–2	(Australia) Anthony Fleet	
3	Saturday 5 February	Mittagong RSL Open 1	Anthony Fleet (Australia)	6–0	(Australia) John Weber	
4	Sunday 6 February	Mittagong RSL Open 2	Anthony Fleet (Australia)	6–3	(Australia) Brian Roach	
5	Saturday 19 February	Redcliffe Darts Open 1	Jeremy Fagg (Australia)	6–5	(Australia) Rob Modra	
6	Sunday 20 February	Redcliffe Darts Open 2	Glen Jones (Australia)	6–5	(Australia) Craig Gwynne	
7	Saturday 5 March	Victoria Open 1	Anthony Fleet (Australia)	6–4	(England) Sean Gibbs	
8	Sunday 6 March	Victoria Open 2	David Platt (England)	6–2	(Australia) Steve Duke Sr	
9	Saturday 19 March	Albion Park Bowling Club Open	Jerry Weyman (Australia)	6–5	(Australia) Mick Parker	
10	Sunday 20 March	DJP Excavations Open	Barry Jouannet Jr (Australia)	6–4	(Australia) Anthony Fleet	
11	Saturday 2 April	Cooma Hotel Open 1	Mick McCreedie (Australia)	6–5	(Australia) Kyle Anderson	
12	Sunday 3 April	Cooma Hotel Open 2	David Platt (England)	6–5	(Australia) Anthony Fleet	
13	Saturday 16 April	Unanderra Hotel Darts Open	Anthony Fleet (Australia)	6–1	(Australia) Kevin Holland	
14	Sunday 17 April	DPA Australian Singles	Barry Jouannet Jr (Australia)	6–1	(Australia) Sean Reed	
15	Sunday 8 May	DPA Australian Matchplay	Anthony Fleet (Australia)	6–2	(Australia) Jeremy Fagg	
16	Saturday 21 May	Goulburn Open 1	Wayne Clegg (England)	6–2	(Australia) Sean Reed	
17	Sunday 22 May	Goulburn Open 2	Barry Jouannet Jr (Australia)	6–5	(Australia) Sean Reed	
18	Saturday 11 June	Gaels Club Open 1	Phillip Hazel (New Zealand)	6–5	(Australia) Marlou Saraba	
19	Sunday 12 June	Gaels Club Open 2	Bill Aitken (Australia)	6–5	(Australia) Sean Reed	
20	Saturday 25 June	NDDA Open 1	Anthony Fleet (Australia)	6–0	(Australia) Craig Atze	
21	Sunday 26 June	NDDA Open 2	David Platt (England)	6–5	(Australia) Alan Ritchie	
22	Saturday 16 July	Carpets Galore Open	Jeremy Fagg (Australia)	6–4	(Australia) Barry Jouannet	
23	Sunday 17 July	Warilla Bowls Club Open	Mick McCreedie (Australia)	6–1	(Australia) Barry Jouannet	
24	Thursday 11 August	Robina Gold Coast Open 1	Phillip Hazel (New Zealand)	6–3	(Australia) Geoff Kime	
25	Friday 12 August	Robina Gold Coast Open 2	Rob Modra (Australia)	6–4	(New Zealand) Warren Parry	
26	Saturday 13 August	Robina Gold Coast Open 3	Rob Modra (Australia)	6–2	(New Zealand) Phillip Hazel	
27	Sunday 14 August	Australian Open	Rob Modra (Australia)	6–1	(Australia) Josh Kime	
28	Saturday 27 August	DPA WA Open 1	Phillip Hazel (New Zealand)	6–5	(England) Wayne Clegg	
29	Sunday 28 August	DPA WA Open 2	Kyle Anderson (Australia)	6–1	(Australia) Sean Reed	
30	Saturday 10 September	Redcliffe Darts Open 3	Sean Reed (Australia)	6–3	(Australia) Russell Homer	
31	Sunday 11 September	Redcliffe Darts Open 4	Geoff Kime (Australia)	6–1	(Australia) Robbie King	
32	Saturday 24 September	Billabong Tavern Darts Open	Kennedy Cruz (Australia)	6–2	(Australia) Mitchell Clegg	
33	Sunday 25 September	Russell Stewart Classic	Mike Bonser (Australia)	6–3	(Australia) Rob Modra	
34	Saturday 8 October	Geelong Open 1	Rob Modra (Australia)	6–4	(Australia) Steve Duke	
35	Sunday 9 October	Geelong Open 2	Rob Modra (Australia)	6–5	(Australia) Tic Bridge	

== Other PDC tournaments ==
The PDC also held a number of other tournaments during 2011. These were mainly smaller events with low prize money, and some had eligibility restrictions. All of these tournaments were non-ranking.

Date	Event	Winner	Score	Runner-Up
1 October	PDC World Japan Qualifying Event	(Japan) Haruki Muramatsu	6–5	(Japan) Syo Katsumi
1 October	South African Masters	(South Africa) Devon Petersen	beat	n/a
9 October	Tom Kirby Memorial Irish Matchplay	(Republic of Ireland) Connie Finnan	6–4	(Republic of Ireland) Shane O'Connor
15 October	Ladbrokes.com Irish Masters	(England) Mark Walsh	6–4	(Australia) Paul Nicholson
30 October	Oceanic Masters	(Australia) Geoff Kime	9–7	(Australia) Barry Jouannet
5 November	PDC World South European Qualifying Event	(Serbia) Oliver Ferenc	6–5	(Croatia) Zdravko Antunovic
5 November	PDC World Greater China Qualifying Event	(Hong Kong) Scott MacKenzie	4–3	(Hong Kong) Royden Lam
6 November	PDC World Philippines Qualifying Event	(Philippines) Ian Perez	beat	(Philippines) Bobong Gabiana
12 November	PDC World East European Qualifying Event	(Austria) Dietmar Burger	6–3	(Slovakia) Peter Martin
19 November	PDC World Finland Qualifying Event	(Finland) Petri Korte	3–0	(Finland) Sami Sanssi
20 November	PDC World Germany Qualifying Event	(Germany) Kevin Münch	10–8	(Germany) Bernd Roith
20 November	PDC World West European Qualifying Event	(Portugal) José de Sousa	6–3	(Spain) Eduardo Sales Lopes
20 November	PDC World Sweden Qualifying Event	(Sweden) Dennis Nilsson	beat	n/a
20 November	PDC World South Asian Qualifying Event	(Malaysia) Lee Choon Peng	beat	n/a
28 November	PDC World Darts Championship PDPA Qualifier	(England) Arron Monk	5–3	(England) Joe Cullen
