= 2011 UK Open Qualifier 2 =

UK Open Qualifier 2

Tournament information
- Dates: Sunday 27 February
- Venue: Metrodome
- Location: Barnsley
- Country: England
- Organisation(s): PDC
- Format: Best of 11 legs
- Prize fund: £34,600
- Winner's share: £6,000

Champion(s)
- (England) Michael Smith

The 2011 UK Open Qualifier 2 was the second of eight 2011 UK Open Darts Qualifiers which was held at the Metrodome in Barnsley on Sunday 27 February.

== Prize money ==
Stage	Prize money (Total-£34,600)
Winner	£6,000
Runner Up	£3,000
Semi Final	£2,000
Quarter Final	£1,000
Fourth Round	£600
Third Round	£400
Second Round	£200
First Round	£0
Preliminary Round	£0

== Draw ==
Second round
(England)	Kevin McDine	4
(Netherlands)	Vincent van der Voort	6
(Netherlands)	Jelle Klaasen	1
(Republic of Ireland)	William O'Connor	6
(England)	Terry Jenkins	6
(England)	Alex Roy	5
(Canada)	John Part	5
(England)	Dennis Smith	6
(England)	Mark Frost	4
(England)	Michael Barnard	6
(Scotland)	Robert Thornton	6
(Wales)	Richie Burnett	3
(England)	Nick Fullwell	6
(England)	Colin Lloyd	4
(England)	Michael Smith	6
(United States)	Gary Mawson	1
(England)	Dave Ladley	3
(England)	Mark Jones	6
(Wales)	Mark Webster	6
(England)	Mark Stephenson	4
(Netherlands)	Michael van Gerwen	6
(England)	Lee Palfreyman	5
(England)	Peter Wright	1
(England)	Colin Osborne	6
(England)	Martyn Turner	1
(England)	Steve Beaton	6
(Australia)	Simon Whitlock	6
(England)	Mark Dudbridge	2
(Scotland)	Gary Anderson	2
(England)	Steve Brown	6
(England)	Denis Ovens	5
(England)	Nigel Heydon	6
(England)	Ken Dobson	4
(England)	Wayne Jones	6
(England)	Scott Rand	4
(England)	Mark Walsh	6
(England)	Joe Cullen	1
(England)	Matt Clark	6
(Wales)	Steve Evans	6
(England)	Adrian Lewis	4
(England)	Dennis Priestley	6
(Wales)	Wayne Atwood	4
(England)	Andy Jenkins	2
(Northern Ireland)	Brendan Dolan	6
(England)	Mark Hylton	5
(England)	Chris Thompson	6
(England)	Darren Johnson	6
(England)	Mervyn King	4
(England)	Jamie Caven	3
(England)	Wayne Mardle	6
(Republic of Ireland)	Shane O'Connor	6
(Netherlands)	Roland Scholten	2
(Netherlands)	Co Stompé	6
(England)	Steve Grubb	3
(England)	Colin Monk	2
(England)	Dave Chisnall	6
(England)	Tony Eccles	2
(Wales)	Barrie Bates	6
(England)	Wes Newton	6
(Australia)	Paul Nicholson	3
(England)	Mark Lawrence	6
(England)	Jason Crawley	5
(England)	Arron Monk	6
(England)	Tony Ayres	4

Third round
(Netherlands)	Vincent van der Voort	6
(Republic of Ireland)	William O'Connor	2
(England)	Terry Jenkins	2
(England)	Dennis Smith	6
(England)	Michael Barnard	4
(Scotland)	Robert Thornton	6
(England)	Nick Fullwell	2
(England)	Michael Smith	6
(England)	Mark Jones	2
(Wales)	Mark Webster	6
(Netherlands)	Michael van Gerwen	6
(England)	Colin Osborne	4
(England)	Steve Beaton	2
(Australia)	Simon Whitlock	6
(England)	Steve Brown	6
(England)	Nigel Heydon	3
(England)	Wayne Jones	4
(England)	Mark Walsh	6
(England)	Matt Clark	6
(Wales)	Steve Evans	0
(England)	Dennis Priestley	4
(Northern Ireland)	Brendan Dolan	6
(England)	Chris Thompson	5
(England)	Darren Johnson	6
(England)	Wayne Mardle	1
(Republic of Ireland)	Shane O'Connor	6
(Netherlands)	Co Stompé	1
(England)	Dave Chisnall	6
(Wales)	Barrie Bates	1
(England)	Wes Newton	6
(England)	Mark Lawrence	4
(England)	Arron Monk	6

Fourth round
(Netherlands)	Vincent van der Voort	6
(England)	Dennis Smith	4
(Scotland)	Robert Thornton	5
(England)	Michael Smith	6
(Wales)	Mark Webster	6
(Netherlands)	Michael van Gerwen	2
(Australia)	Simon Whitlock	6
(England)	Steve Brown	3
(England)	Mark Walsh	6
(England)	Matt Clark	2
(Northern Ireland)	Brendan Dolan	3
(England)	Darren Johnson	6
(Republic of Ireland)	Shane O'Connor	2
(England)	Dave Chisnall	6
(England)	Wes Newton	6
(England)	Arron Monk	1

Quarter-finals
(Netherlands)	Vincent van der Voort	2
(England)	Michael Smith	6
(Wales)	Mark Webster	3
(Australia)	Simon Whitlock	6
(England)	Mark Walsh	5
(England)	Darren Johnson	6
(England)	Dave Chisnall	6
(England)	Wes Newton	5

Semi-finals
(England)	Michael Smith	6
(Australia)	Simon Whitlock	4
(England)	Darren Johnson	4
(England)	Dave Chisnall	6

Final
(England)	Michael Smith	6
(England)	Dave Chisnall	5
