= 2012 UK Open =

2012 Speedy Hire UK Open

Tournament information
- Dates: 7–10 June 2012
- Venue: Reebok Stadium
- Location: Bolton, England
- Organisation(s): Professional Darts Corporation (PDC)
- Format: Legs; Final – best of 21
- Prize fund: £200,000
- Winner's share: £40,000
- Nine-dart finish: (Scotland) Gary Anderson

Champion(s)
- Robert Thornton (SCO)

The 2012 Speedy Hire UK Open was a Darts tournament staged in the UK by the Professional Darts Corporation. It was the tenth year of the tournament where, following numerous regional qualifying heats throughout Britain, players competed in a single elimination tournament to be crowned champion. The tournament was held at the Reebok Stadium in Bolton, England, between 7–10 June 2012, and has the nickname, "the FA Cup of darts" as a random draw is staged after each round until the final.

Robert Thornton won the tournament beating Phil Taylor 11–5 in the final to win his first PDC major.

== Format and qualifiers ==
=== 2012 UK Open qualifiers ===
There were eight qualifying events staged across England between February and May 2012 to determine the UK Open Order of Merit Table. The tournament winners were:

No.	Date	Venue	Winner	Legs	Runner-up	Total Prize Money	Winner	Runner-up
1	Saturday 11 February	K2 Centre, Crawley	Wes Newton (England)	6–3	(Belgium) Kim Huybrechts	£34,600	£6,000	£3,000
2	Sunday 12 February	K2 Centre, Crawley	Michael van Gerwen (Netherlands)	6–1	(England) Dave Chisnall	£34,600	£6,000	£3,000
3	Saturday 24 March	Barnsley Metrodome, Barnsley	Phil Taylor (England)	6–2	(Northern Ireland) Brendan Dolan	£34,600	£6,000	£3,000
4	Sunday 25 March	Barnsley Metrodome, Barnsley	Phil Taylor (England)	6–3	(England) Dennis Smith	£34,600	£6,000	£3,000
5	Saturday 14 April	Barnsley Metrodome, Barnsley	Raymond van Barneveld (Netherlands)	6–3	(England) Andy Smith	£34,600	£6,000	£3,000
6	Sunday 15 April	Barnsley Metrodome, Barnsley	Raymond van Barneveld (Netherlands)	6–2	(England) Ian White	£34,600	£6,000	£3,000
7	Saturday 5 May	NIA Community Hall, Birmingham	Terry Jenkins (England)	6–3	(England) Andy Hamilton	£34,600	£6,000	£3,000
8	Sunday 6 May	NIA Community Hall, Birmingham	Wes Newton (England)	6–2	(England) Justin Pipe	£34,600	£6,000	£3,000

The tournament featured 178 players. The results of the eight qualifiers shown above were collated into the UK Open Order of Merit. The top 32 players and ties in the Order of Merit, who played a minimum of two events, received a place at the final tournament. In addition, the next 82 players in the Order of Merit list qualified for the tournament, but needed to start in the earlier rounds played on the Thursday. A further 64 players qualified via regional qualifying tournaments.

=== Top 32 in Order of Merit (receiving byes into third round) ===
1. (Netherlands) Raymond van Barneveld
2. (England) Wes Newton
3. (England) Phil Taylor
4. (England) Terry Jenkins
5. (England) Andy Smith
6. (Netherlands) Michael van Gerwen
7. (Northern Ireland) Brendan Dolan
8. (England) Justin Pipe
9. (Australia) Simon Whitlock
10. (England) Andy Hamilton
11. (Belgium) Kim Huybrechts
12. (England) Dave Chisnall
13. (England) Dean Winstanley
14. (England) Colin Lloyd
15. (Netherlands) Vincent van der Voort
16. (Scotland) Robert Thornton (winner)
17. (England) Ian White
18. (England) Michael Smith
19. (England) Dennis Smith
20. (England) Kevin Painter
21. (England) Jamie Caven
22. (England) Joe Cullen
23. (England) Mark Jones
24. (England) Dennis Priestley
25. (England) Adrian Lewis
26. (England) James Hubbard
27. (Wales) Richie Burnett
28. (England) Darren Webster
29. (England) Richie Howson
30. (Scotland) Gary Anderson
31. (Canada) John Part
32. (England) Kevin Dowling

=== Number 33–64 of the Order of Merit (receiving byes into second round) ===
33. (India) Prakash Jiwa
34. (England) Shaun Griffiths
35. (England) Colin Osborne
36. (Netherlands) Roland Scholten
37. (England) Ronnie Baxter
38. (England) Mark Hylton
39. (England) Andrew Gilding
40. (England) James Wade
41. (Netherlands) Jelle Klaasen
42. (England) Alex Roy
43. (Scotland) Peter Wright
44. (England) Stuart White
45. (South Africa) Devon Petersen
46. (England) Peter Hudson
47. (England) Johnny Haines
48. (England) Darren Johnson
49. (Wales) Mark Webster
50. (England) Stuart Kellett
51. (Scotland) Keith Stephen
52. (England) Mark Walsh
53. (Republic of Ireland) William O'Connor
54. (England) James Richardson
55. (Spain) Antonio Alcinas
56. (Scotland) Jim Walker
57. (England) Mervyn King
58. (England) Alan Tabern
59. (Northern Ireland) Mickey Mansell
60. (England) Andy Brown
61. (England) Matthew Edgar
62. (England) Scott Rand
63. (Netherlands) Co Stompé
64. (Netherlands) Mareno Michels

=== Remaining Order of Merit qualifiers (starting in first and preliminary round) ===
65. (England) Matt Clark
66. (England) Arron Monk
67. (England) Wayne Jones
68. (Australia) Paul Nicholson
69. (Scotland) John Henderson
70. (England) Terry Temple
71. (England) Ted Hankey
72. (England) Steve Beaton
73. (England) Andrew Cornwall
74. (England) Steve Farmer
75. (England) Nigel Heydon
76. (England) Adam Hunt
77. (England) Liam Kelly
78. (Wales) Jamie Lewis
79. (England) Joey Palfreyman
80. (Gibraltar) Dyson Parody
81. (England) Ross Smith
82. (England) Adam Smith-Neale
83. (Netherlands) Gino Vos
84. (England) Brian Woods
85. (England) Gaz Cousins
86. (Republic of Ireland) Connie Finnan
87. (England) Adrian Gray
88. (England) Sam Hill
89. (England) Andy Jenkins
90. (England) Josh Jones
91. (England) Dave Ladley
92. (England) Tony Littleton
93. (England) Kevin McDine
94. (Germany) Bernd Roith
95. (England) Mark Stephenson
96. (England) Michael Barnard
97. (England) Jon Bott
98. (England) John Bowles
99. (England) Steve Brown
100. (England) Jason Crawley
101. (Wales) Steve Evans
102. (England) Mark Frost
103. (Netherlands) Toon Greebe
104. (England) Stephen Hardy
105. (Netherlands) Jerry Hendriks
106. (England) Steve Hine
107. (England) Mark Lawrence
108. (England) Steve Maish
109. (England) Joe Murnan
110. (England) Denis Ovens
111. (England) John Scott
112. (England) Damien Sherwood
113. (England) Mick Todd
114. (England) Tony West

=== Rileys qualifiers ===
32 players qualified from Rileys qualifiers held in Rileys Dart Zones across Britain.

- (Wales) Mark Layton
- (England) Kevin Simm
- (England) Jamie Robinson
- (England) Jamie Ellam
- (England) Glen Durrant
- (England) Andy Parsons
- (England) Dan Russell
- (England) Tom Gregory
- (England) Shayne Burgess
- (England) Tony Cooper
- (England) Davey Dodds
- (Scotland) Mark Barilli
- (England) Rob Hawker
- (England) Ben Burton
- (Scotland) Gus Santana
- (England) John Nelson
- (England) Dean Stewart
- (England) Harry Miles
- (England) Stephen Bunting
- (England) Tony Broughton
- (England) Marc Dewsbury
- (England) Jason Wilson
- (England) Lee Bryant
- (England) Andy Roberts
- (England) Kevin Rimmer
- (England) Jamie Hughes
- (Scotland) Stuart Anderson
- (England) Geoff Heath
- (England) Michael Burgoine
- (England) Scott Taylor
- (Scotland) Scott Robertson
- (England) Ian Gleeson

=== Speedy qualifiers ===
32 players qualified from Speedy qualifiers held at seven venues across Britain from April to May.

Brighton

- (England) Alan Casey
- (England) Bob Crawley
- (England) Gary Ettridge
- (England) Jon Jukes

Dartford

- (England) Paul Amos
- (England) Michael Wiles
- (England) Thomas Sandwell
- (England) Dave Solly

Inverness

- (Scotland) Ryan Murray
- (Scotland) Andy Murray
- (Scotland) Nicky Denoon
- (Scotland) Craig McCaskill

Leeds

- (England) Danny Dutson
- (England) Mick Hayward
- (England) Steve Service

Stoke-on-Trent

- (England) Steve Mason
- (England) Paul Whitworth
- (England) David Pallett
- (England) Paul Harvey

Cardiff

- (England) Lee Russell
- (England) Steve Werrett
- (England) Paul Boulton
- (Wales) Jon Farmer
- (England) Glenn Miller

Haydock

- (England) Ben Johnson
- (England) Paul Critchley
- (England) Andy Melling
- (England) Mark Kelly
- (Wales) Mark Spencer
- (England) Darrin Pugh
- (Scotland) Kirk Gordon
- (England) Stuart Daniels

== Prize money ==
For the fourth consecutive UK Open, the prize fund will be £200,000.

Stage (no. of players)		Prize money (Total: £200,000)
Winner	(1)	£40,000
Runner-Up	(1)	£20,000
Semi-finalists	(2)	£10,000
Quarter-finalists	(4)	£6,000
Last 16 (fifth round)	(8)	£4,000
Last 32 (fourth round)	(16)	£2,000
Last 64 (third round)	(32)	£1,000
Last 96 (second round)	(32)	n/a
Last 128 (first round)	(32)	n/a
Last 178 (preliminary round)	(50)	n/a

== Draw ==
The draw for the preliminary, first and second rounds was made on 10 May.

=== Thursday 7 June; Best of 7 legs ===
==== Preliminary round ====
Player #1	Score	Player #2	Player #1	Score	Player #2
(England) Paul Amos	4–0	(England) Gary Ettridge	(England) Nigel Heydon	4–0	(England) Paul Critchley
(England) Ben Johnson	0–4	(England) Stuart Daniels	(England) Steve Farmer	1–4	(Wales) Jamie Lewis
(England) Joey Palfreyman	4–3	(England) Tom Gregory	(England) Jason Wilson	1–4	(Germany) Bernd Roith
(Scotland) Kirk Gordon	0–4	(England) Kevin McDine	(England) David Pallett	2–4	(Netherlands) Jerry Hendriks
(England) Steve Brown	4–2	(England) Michael Barnard	(England) Harry Miles	4–0	(England) Andy Melling
(England) Steve Beaton	2–4	(England) Jon Jukes	(England) Steve Hine	4–3	(England) Jamie Hughes
(England) Josh Jones	4–0	(Wales) Mark Spencer	(England) Arron Monk	4–3	(England) Paul Boulton
(England) Gaz Cousins	4–0	(England) Ben Burton	(England) Geoff Heath	4–0	(England) Darrin Pugh
(England) Steve Maish	4–2	(England) Dave Solly	(England) Ted Hankey	4–0	(England) Danny Dutson
(England) Adam Smith-Neale	4–3	(England) Rob Hawker	(Scotland) Gus Santana	2–4	(England) Andy Jenkins
(England) Andy Parsons	3–4	(England) Dean Stewart	(England) Steve Service	1–4	(England) Damien Sherwood
(England) Marc Dewsbury	3–4	(England) Stephen Hardy	(England) John Scott	2–4	(England) Brian Woods
(England) Denis Ovens	4–1	(Scotland) Craig McCaskill	(England) John Nelson	4–3	(England) Ross Smith
(England) Glen Durrant	0–4	(England) Stephen Bunting	(England) Mark Lawrence	1–4	(England) Jamie Robinson
(England) Steve Werrett	0–4	(Scotland) Mark Barilli	(England) Davey Dodds	4–1	(England) Alan Casey
(England) Anthony Littleton	4–2	(Scotland) Nicky Denoon	(England) Adrian Gray	3–4	(Wales) Steve Evans
(England) Glen Miller	1–4	(England) Mark Frost	(Wales) Mark Layton	4–2	(England) Michael Wiles
(Netherlands) Gino Vos	4–2	(England) Paul Harvey	(Scotland) Scott Robertson	4–1	(England) Mick Todd
(England) Lee Bryant	†	(Scotland) John Henderson	(England) Sam Hill	4–1	(England) Jamie Ellam
(England) Tony Broughton	3–4	(England) Tony Cooper	(England) Scott Taylor	1–4	(England) Lee Russell
(England) Tony West	2–4	(England) Michael Burgoine	(England) Kevin Simm	4–0	(England) Mick Hayward
(Republic of Ireland) Connie Finnan	‡	(Scotland) Andy Murray	(Scotland) Stuart Anderson	2–4	(England) Joe Murnan
(England) Ian Gleeson	3–4	(England) Kevin Rimmer	(England) Terry Temple	4–2	(England) Matt Clark
(England) Andrew Cornwall	3–4	(England) John Bowles	(England) Dan Russell	4–2	(Netherlands) Toon Greebe
(Gibraltar) Dyson Parody	4–0	(England) Steve Mason	(England) Dave Ladley	0–4	(England) Liam Kelly

- † John Henderson received a bye as Lee Bryant was disqualified due to failing to register at the event.
- ‡ Connie Finnan withdrew because of personal reasons.

==== Round 1 ====
Player #1	Score	Player #2	Player #1	Score	Player #2
(England) Stuart Daniels	0–4	(England) Adam Smith-Neale	(England) Geoff Heath	3–4	(England) Paul Amos
(England) Jamie Robinson	2–4	(England) Stephen Bunting	(England) Andy Roberts	3–4	(England) John Bowles
(Germany) Bernd Roith	2–4	(England) Wayne Jones	(England) John Nelson	1–4	(England) Denis Ovens
(England) Liam Kelly	4–2	(England) Shayne Burgess	(England) Dean Stewart	4–1	(England) Brian Woods
(Scotland) Mark Barilli	4–3	(England) Bob Crawley	(England) Thomas Sandwell	0–4	(England) Steve Hine
(Netherlands) Gino Vos	3–4	(Wales) Mark Layton	(England) Paul Whitworth	2–4	(Wales) Steve Evans
(England) Mark Frost	1–4	(England) Tony Cooper	(Wales) Jon Farmer	2–4	(England) Anthony Littleton
(England) Jason Crawley	4–1	(England) Kevin Simm	(England) Gareth Cousins	4–2	(England) Michael Burgoine
(England) Ted Hankey	4–1	(England) Andy Jenkins	(England) Jon Jukes	3–4	(England) Davey Dodds
(England) Joe Murnan	4–1	(England) Dan Russell	(England) Terry Temple	4–0	(England) Mark Kelly
(Scotland) Scott Robertson	4–1	(England) Sam Hill	(England) Jon Bott	4–2	(England) Josh Jones
(Scotland) John Henderson	4–3	(England) Joey Palfreyman	(England) Stephen Hardy	4–2	(Scotland) Ryan Murray
(England) Arron Monk	4–3	(Netherlands) Jerry Hendriks	(Scotland) Andy Murray	4–1	(England) Damien Sherwood
(Gibraltar) Dyson Parody	4–2	(England) Kevin Rimmer	(England) Kevin McDine	4–2	(England) Steve Brown
(Wales) Jamie Lewis	4–1	(England) Mark Stephenson	(England) Lee Russell	1–4	(England) Nigel Heydon
(England) Steve Maish	2–4	(England) Adam Hunt	(Australia) Paul Nicholson	4–2	(England) Harry Miles

==== Round 2 ====
Player #1	Score	Player #2	Player #1	Score	Player #2
(England) Stephen Hardy	1–4	(Republic of Ireland) William O'Connor	(Scotland) Andy Murray	3–4	(England) Scott Rand
(Netherlands) Jelle Klaasen	4–3	(Gibraltar) Dyson Parody	(Scotland) John Henderson	2–4	(England) Colin Osborne
(England) Nigel Heydon	4–1	(England) John Bowles	(England) Andy Brown	0–4	(Scotland) Peter Wright
(England) Dean Stewart	4–1	(England) Adam Smith-Neale	(Wales) Steve Evans	3–4	(Netherlands) Roland Scholten
(England) Arron Monk	4–1	(England) Adam Hunt	(England) Mark Hylton	4–0	(Spain) Antonio Alcinas
(Australia) Paul Nicholson	4–3	(England) Tony Cooper	(South Africa) Devon Petersen	4–0	(England) Andrew Gilding
(Wales) Mark Webster	4–3	(England) Johnny Haines	(England) Steve Hine	1–4	(England) Terry Temple
(England) Jason Crawley	4–3	(England) Mark Walsh	(England) James Richardson	1–4	(Scotland) Jim Walker
(England) Stuart White	2–4	(England) Davey Dodds	(England) Liam Kelly	1–4	(England) Stuart Kellett
(England) Matthew Edgar	0–4	(England) Kevin McDine	(England) Peter Hudson	4–1	(Wales) Jamie Lewis
(Netherlands) Co Stompé	0–4	(England) Alan Tabern	(England) Mervyn King	4–1	(England) Ted Hankey
(England) Wayne Jones	3–4	(England) Paul Amos	(England) Darren Johnson	0–4	(Northern Ireland) Mickey Mansell
(India) Prakash Jiwa	2–4	(Scotland) Mark Barilli	(England) Denis Ovens	4–1	(England) Joe Murnan
(England) Alex Roy	2–4	(England) Gareth Cousins	(Scotland) Keith Stephen	3–4	(Scotland) Scott Robertson
(Netherlands) Mareno Michels	2–4	(England) Shaun Griffiths	(England) James Wade	4–3	(England) Stephen Bunting
(England) Jon Bott	2–4	(England) Ronnie Baxter	(England) Anthony Littleton	3–4	(Wales) Mark Layton

=== Friday 8 June; Best of 17 legs ===
==== Round 3 ====
Player #1	Score	Player #2	Player #1	Score	Player #2
(England) Kevin McDine	1–9	(England) Adrian Lewis	(England) Andy Smith	9–6	(England) Scott Rand
(England) Mervyn King	9–3	(England) Gareth Cousins	(England) Kevin Painter	8–9	(England) Arron Monk
(England) Ronnie Baxter	9–6	(South Africa) Devon Petersen	(Netherlands) Roland Scholten	7–9	(England) Phil Taylor
(Wales) Mark Webster	7–9	(Scotland) Robert Thornton	(England) Paul Amos	6–9	(Netherlands) Vincent van der Voort
(Scotland) Gary Anderson †	9–3	(England) Davey Dodds	(England) Kevin Dowling	4–9	(England) Dennis Priestley
(Australia) Paul Nicholson	9–7	(Northern Ireland) Mickey Mansell	(England) Mark Jones	‡	(England) Dennis Smith
(Scotland) Scott Robertson	2–9	(England) Justin Pipe	(Republic of Ireland) William O'Connor	3–9	(Netherlands) Michael van Gerwen
(England) Dean Stewart	3–9	(England) Denis Ovens	(England) Jason Crawley	5–9	(England) Dean Winstanley
(Scotland) Peter Wright	9–7	(Canada) John Part	(England) Peter Hudson	4–9	(Belgium) Kim Huybrechts
(England) Dave Chisnall	9–7	(Wales) Mark Layton	(England) Nigel Heydon	4–9	(England) Colin Osborne
(England) Ian White	8–9	(Wales) Richie Burnett	(England) Michael Smith	7–9	(England) Darren Webster
(Netherlands) Raymond van Barneveld	9–3	(Netherlands) Jelle Klaasen	(England) Wes Newton	9–1	(England) Shaun Griffiths
(England) Jamie Caven	9–6	(England) Alan Tabern	(England) Mark Hylton	9–6	(England) Stuart Kellett
(England) Terry Temple	6–9	(Australia) Simon Whitlock	(England) James Hubbard	6–9	(England) Terry Jenkins
(Scotland) Jim Walker	4–9	(England) Joe Cullen	(England) James Wade	5–9	(England) Colin Lloyd
(England) Richie Howson	2–9	(England) Andy Hamilton	(Scotland) Mark Barilli	8–9	(Northern Ireland) Brendan Dolan

- † Gary Anderson hit a nine-dart finish in the third leg against Davey Dodds.
- ‡ Dennis Smith received a bye as Mark Jones was disqualified due to failing to register at the event.

=== Saturday 9 June; Best of 17 legs ===
==== Round 4 ====
Player #1	Score	Player #2	Player #1	Score	Player #2
(England) Colin Lloyd	8–9	(England) Joe Cullen	(England) Justin Pipe	5–9	(Australia) Simon Whitlock
(Wales) Richie Burnett	4–9	(Scotland) Peter Wright	(Australia) Paul Nicholson	9–3	(England) Arron Monk
(Netherlands) Vincent van der Voort	7–9	(Belgium) Kim Huybrechts	(England) Colin Osborne	1–9	(England) Phil Taylor
(England) Mark Hylton	7–9	(England) Jamie Caven	(England) Dennis Smith	5–9	(England) Dave Chisnall
(Northern Ireland) Brendan Dolan	8–9	(England) Denis Ovens	(England) Dennis Priestley	9–8	(England) Andy Smith
(England) Darren Webster	6–9	(England) Ronnie Baxter	(Scotland) Robert Thornton	9–7	(Scotland) Gary Anderson
(England) Andy Hamilton	5–9	(Netherlands) Raymond van Barneveld	(England) Terry Jenkins	9–3	(England) Dean Winstanley
(Netherlands) Michael van Gerwen	9–7	(England) Mervyn King	(England) Wes Newton	9–7	(England) Adrian Lewis

==== Round 5 ====
Player #1	Score	Player #2	Player #1	Score	Player #2
(Netherlands) Michael van Gerwen 93.47	7–9	(England) Terry Jenkins 89.86	(Scotland) Robert Thornton 91.54	9–5	(England) Dennis Priestley 94.58
(England) Dave Chisnall 101.46	9–5	(Australia) Simon Whitlock 91.58	(England) Joe Cullen 85.03	8–9	(England) Jamie Caven 86.19
(England) Phil Taylor 110.72	9–4	(England) Ronnie Baxter 97.96	(England) Denis Ovens 86.72	9–8	(Australia) Paul Nicholson 90.02
(Netherlands) Raymond van Barneveld 93.40	9–8	(Scotland) Peter Wright 89.53	(Belgium) Kim Huybrechts 93.96	8–9	(England) Wes Newton 99.22

=== Sunday 10 June ===
==== Quarter-finals to final ====
Quarter-finals (best of 19 legs)
(Scotland) Robert Thornton 92.78	10
(England) Wes Newton 92.11	8
(England) Dave Chisnall 98.84	10
(Netherlands) Raymond van Barneveld 98.27	5
(England) Phil Taylor 106.52	10
(England) Terry Jenkins 96.46	5
(England) Denis Ovens 86.67	10
(England) Jamie Caven 88.39	6

Semi-finals (best of 19 legs)
(Scotland) Robert Thornton 97.72	10
(England) Dave Chisnall 95.01	4
(England) Phil Taylor 101.22	10
(England) Denis Ovens 86.14	2

Final (best of 21 legs)
(Scotland) Robert Thornton 95.44	11
(England) Phil Taylor 98.58	5

== See also ==
- UK Open history of event and previous winners
- 2012 PDC Pro Tour includes extended results of Pro Tour events
- PDC Pro Tour history of PDC "floor events"
