= 2011 UK Open Qualifier 3 =

UK Open Qualifier 3

Tournament information
- Dates: Saturday 12 March
- Venue: Robin Park Tennis Centre
- Location: Wigan
- Country: England
- Organisation(s): PDC
- Format: Best of 11 legs
- Prize fund: £34,600
- Winner's share: £6,000

Champion(s)
- (England) Adrian Lewis

The 2011 UK Open Qualifier 3 was the third of eight 2011 UK Open Darts Qualifiers which was held at the Robin Park Tennis Centre in Wigan on Saturday 12 March.

== Prize money ==
Stage	Prize money (Total-£34,600)
Winner	£6,000
Runner Up	£3,000
Semi Final	£2,000
Quarter Final	£1,000
Fourth Round	£600
Third Round	£400
Second Round	£200
First Round	£0
Preliminary Round	£0

== Draw ==
Second round
(England)	Tony Eccles	4
(England)	Mark Lawrence	6
(England)	Chris Aubrey	6
(England)	Mark Hylton	4
(Netherlands)	Vincent van der Voort	6
(Republic of Ireland)	Mick McGowan	0
(England)	Mark Frost	5
(England)	Andy Hamilton	6
(England)	Stephen Hardy	6
(England)	Joe Cullen	3
(England)	Wes Newton	5
(England)	Jamie Caven	6
(England)	James Richardson	1
(England)	Kevin Painter	6
(England)	Andy Jenkins	6
(Netherlands)	Raymond van Barneveld	4
(England)	Steve Brown	6
(England)	Jimmy Mann	0
(England)	Tony Ayres	6
(Netherlands)	Jelle Klaasen	3
(England)	Michael Barnard	6
(England)	Mick Todd	1
(Republic of Ireland)	Shane O'Connor	6
(Germany)	Michael Rosenauer	3
(England)	Louis Blundell	5
(England)	Adrian Lewis	6
(Republic of Ireland)	Aodhagan O'Neill	1
(Australia)	Paul Nicholson	6
(England)	Denis Ovens	3
(England)	Steve Maish	6
(England)	Ronnie Baxter	1
(England)	Scott Rand	6
(Northern Ireland)	Brendan Dolan	1
(Scotland)	Robert Thornton	6
(England)	Andy Smith	6
(England)	Steve Beaton	5
(England)	Dennis Priestley	3
(England)	Nigel Heydon	6
(England)	Michael Smith	6
(England)	Alex Roy	3
(England)	Ian White	6
(England)	Nick Fullwell	5
(Canada)	John Part	3
(England)	Mark Walsh	6
(England)	Mark Dudbridge	6
(Spain)	Antonio Alcinas	5
(Wales)	Richie Burnett	6
(Wales)	Barrie Bates	3
(Netherlands)	Michael van Gerwen	3
(England)	Peter Wright	6
(Netherlands)	Mareno Michels	0
(England)	Matt Jackson	6
(Australia)	Simon Whitlock	6
(Republic of Ireland)	William O'Connor	1
(England)	Darren Johnson	1
(England)	Mervyn King	6
(Republic of Ireland)	John O'Shea	1
(Scotland)	Gary Anderson	6
(Sweden)	Magnus Caris	6
(England)	Arron Monk	5
(Wales)	Mark Webster	6
(England)	Dean Jones	3
(England)	Terry Jenkins	6
(England)	Shaun Griffiths	4

Third round
(England)	Mark Lawrence	1
(England)	Chris Aubrey	6
(Netherlands)	Vincent van der Voort	5
(England)	Andy Hamilton	6
(England)	Stephen Hardy	3
(England)	Jamie Caven	6
(England)	Kevin Painter	4
(England)	Andy Jenkins	6
(England)	Steve Brown	6
(England)	Tony Ayres	2
(England)	Michael Barnard	6
(Republic of Ireland)	Shane O'Connor	3
(England)	Adrian Lewis	6
(Australia)	Paul Nicholson	1
(England)	Steve Maish	5
(England)	Scott Rand	6
(Scotland)	Robert Thornton	6
(England)	Andy Smith	1
(England)	Nigel Heydon	2
(England)	Michael Smith	6
(England)	Ian White	5
(England)	Mark Walsh	6
(England)	Mark Dudbridge	4
(Wales)	Richie Burnett	6
(England)	Peter Wright	6
(England)	Matt Jackson	2
(Australia)	Simon Whitlock	4
(England)	Mervyn King	6
(Scotland)	Gary Anderson	6
(Sweden)	Magnus Caris	5
(Wales)	Mark Webster	6
(England)	Terry Jenkins	4

Fourth round
(England)	Chris Aubrey	4
(England)	Andy Hamilton	6
(England)	Jamie Caven	4
(England)	Andy Jenkins	6
(England)	Steve Brown	6
(England)	Michael Barnard	5
(England)	Adrian Lewis	6
(England)	Scott Rand	4
(Scotland)	Robert Thornton	6
(England)	Michael Smith	3
(England)	Mark Walsh	3
(Wales)	Richie Burnett	6
(England)	Peter Wright	6
(England)	Mervyn King	4
(Scotland)	Gary Anderson	6
(Wales)	Mark Webster	2

Quarter-finals
(England)	Andy Hamilton	4
(England)	Andy Jenkins	6
(England)	Steve Brown	4
(England)	Adrian Lewis	6
(Scotland)	Robert Thornton	6
(Wales)	Richie Burnett	5
(England)	Peter Wright	3
(Scotland)	Gary Anderson	6

Semi-finals
(England)	Andy Jenkins	4
(England)	Adrian Lewis	6
(Scotland)	Robert Thornton	6
(Scotland)	Gary Anderson	2

Final
(England)	Adrian Lewis	6
(Scotland)	Robert Thornton	4
