= 2011 UK Open Qualifier 6 =

UK Open Qualifier 6

Tournament information
- Dates: Sunday 17 April
- Venue: Metrodome
- Location: Barnsley
- Country: England
- Organisation(s): PDC
- Format: Best of 11 legs
- Prize fund: £34,600
- Winner's share: £6,000

Champion(s)
- (England) Phil Taylor

The 2011 UK Open Qualifier 6 was the sixth of eight 2011 UK Open Darts Qualifiers which was held at the Metrodome in Barnsley on Sunday 17 April.

== Prize money ==
Stage	Prize money (Total-£34,600)
Winner	£6,000
Runner Up	£3,000
Semi Final	£2,000
Quarter Final	£1,000
Fourth Round	£600
Third Round	£400
Second Round	£200
First Round	£0
Preliminary Round	£0

== Draw ==
Second round
(England)	Wayne Jones	5
(England)	James Wade	6
(Netherlands)	Roland Scholten	6
(England)	Andy Hamilton	5
(Netherlands)	Michael van Gerwen	6
(England)	Mark Frost	0
(England)	Colin Lloyd	6
(England)	Matt Jackson	2
(England)	Wes Newton	6
(Republic of Ireland)	William O'Connor	5
(Netherlands)	Co Stompé	5
(England)	Mark Hylton	6
(England)	Peter Wright	6
(England)	Kevin Painter	3
(England)	Steve Beaton	2
(England)	Steve Brown	6
(Northern Ireland)	Brendan Dolan	6
(England)	Peter Manley	2
(England)	Terry Jenkins	2
(England)	Mark Dudbridge	6
(England)	Denis Ovens	6
(England)	Adrian Lewis	3
(Australia)	Simon Whitlock	6
(Germany)	Michael Rosenauer	3
(England)	Dave Ladley	3
(England)	Andy Smith	6
(England)	Dennis Smith	6
(England)	Brian Woods	3
(England)	Phil Taylor	6
(England)	Darren Whittingham	0
(Netherlands)	Jelle Klaasen	4
(Wales)	Richie Burnett	6
(England)	Chris Aubrey	3
(England)	Tony Eccles	6
(Sweden)	Magnus Caris	6
(England)	Nigel Heydon	3
(England)	Mark Lawrence	4
(England)	Joe Cullen	6
(England)	James Richardson	6
(England)	Scott Rand	1
(England)	Ronnie Baxter	6
(Germany)	Jyhan Artut	3
(England)	Dennis Priestley	6
(England)	Steve Grubb	5
(England)	Jason Crawley	5
(England)	Darren Johnson	6
(Scotland)	Gary Anderson	6
(England)	Mervyn King	3
(England)	Mick Todd	3
(England)	Alan Tabern	6
(England)	Jamie Caven	6
(England)	Dave Chisnall	3
(Australia)	Paul Nicholson	6
(Belgium)	Rocco Maes	3
(England)	Colin Osborne	6
(England)	Geoff Whitworth	1
(Wales)	Barrie Bates	6
(Republic of Ireland)	Shane O'Connor	5
(Scotland)	John Henderson	6
(Spain)	Antonio Alcinas	1
(England)	Louis Blundell	2
(Scotland)	Robert Thornton	6
(England)	Kirk Shepherd	6
(Canada)	Ken MacNeil	1

Third round
(England)	James Wade	6
(Netherlands)	Roland Scholten	4
(Netherlands)	Michael van Gerwen	6
(England)	Colin Lloyd	4
(England)	Wes Newton	6
(England)	Mark Hylton	2
(England)	Peter Wright	4
(England)	Steve Brown	6
(Northern Ireland)	Brendan Dolan	2
(England)	Mark Dudbridge	6
(England)	Denis Ovens	1
(Australia)	Simon Whitlock	6
(England)	Andy Smith	1
(England)	Dennis Smith	6
(England)	Phil Taylor	6
(Wales)	Richie Burnett	4
(England)	Tony Eccles	1
(Sweden)	Magnus Caris	6
(England)	Joe Cullen	6
(England)	James Richardson	3
(England)	Ronnie Baxter	6
(England)	Dennis Priestley	4
(England)	Darren Johnson	3
(Scotland)	Gary Anderson	6
(England)	Alan Tabern	3
(England)	Jamie Caven	6
(Australia)	Paul Nicholson	6
(England)	Colin Osborne	5
(Wales)	Barrie Bates	6
(Scotland)	John Henderson	5
(Scotland)	Robert Thornton	6
(England)	Kirk Shepherd	2

Fourth round
(England)	James Wade	6
(Netherlands)	Michael van Gerwen	5
(England)	Wes Newton	4
(England)	Steve Brown	6
(England)	Mark Dudbridge	6
(Australia)	Simon Whitlock	2
(England)	Dennis Smith	1
(England)	Phil Taylor	6
(Sweden)	Magnus Caris	4
(England)	Joe Cullen	6
(England)	Ronnie Baxter	3
(Scotland)	Gary Anderson	6
(England)	Jamie Caven	2
(Australia)	Paul Nicholson	6
(Wales)	Barrie Bates	0
(Scotland)	Robert Thornton	6

Quarter-finals
(England)	James Wade	4
(England)	Steve Brown	6
(England)	Mark Dudbridge	2
(England)	Phil Taylor	6
(England)	Joe Cullen	6
(Scotland)	Gary Anderson	5
(Australia)	Paul Nicholson	4
(Scotland)	Robert Thornton	6

Semi-finals
(England)	Steve Brown	3
(England)	Phil Taylor	6
(England)	Joe Cullen	6
(England)	Robert Thornton	3

Final
(England)	Phil Taylor	6
(England)	Joe Cullen	1
