= 2012 Austrian Darts Open =

Tournament information
- Dates: 27–29 April 2012
- Venue: Arena Nova
- Location: Wiener Neustadt
- Country: Austria
- Organisation(s): PDC
- Format: Legs
- Prize fund: £82,100
- Winner's share: £15,000
- Nine-dart finish: (England) Michael Smith (Australia) Simon Whitlock

Champion(s)
- (England) Justin Pipe

The 2012 Austrian Darts Open was the first of five PDC European Tour events on the 2012 PDC Pro Tour. The tournament took place at the Arena Nova in Wiener Neustadt near Vienna, Austria, from 27 to 29 April 2012. It featured a field of 64 players and £82,100 in prize money, with £15,000 going to the winner.

Justin Pipe won the title, by defeating James Wade 6–3 in the final. Michael Smith and Simon Whitlock both threw nine-dart finishes during the tournament.

== Prize money ==
Stage (num. of players)		Prize money
Winner	(1)	£15,000
Runner-up	(1)	£7,500
Semi-finalists	(2)	£5,000
Quarter-finalists	(4)	£3,000
Third round losers	(8)	£1,500
Second round losers	(16)	£1,000
First round losers	(32)	£200
Final qualifying round losers	(32)	£100
Total	£82,100	

== Qualification ==
The top 32 players from the PDC Order of Merit automatically qualified for the event. The remaining 32 places went to players from three qualifying events - 20 from the UK Qualifier (held in Barnsley on 13 April), eight from the European Qualifier (held in Cologne on 7 April) and four from the Host Nation Qualifier (held in Eisenstadt on 31 March).

Phil Taylor and Adrian Lewis withdrew from the event, with their opponents (Gaz Cousins & James Richardson) receiving byes to the second round.

1–32

1. ~~(England) Phil Taylor (withdrew)~~
2. ~~(England) Adrian Lewis (withdrew)~~
3. (England) James Wade (runner-up)
4. (Scotland) Gary Anderson (third round)
5. (Australia) Simon Whitlock (second round)
6. (England) Wes Newton (quarter-finals)
7. (England) Andy Hamilton (second round)
8. (Wales) Mark Webster (third round)
9. (Netherlands) Raymond van Barneveld (semi-finals)
10. (England) Kevin Painter (third round)
11. (England) Terry Jenkins (second round)
12. (England) Mark Walsh (third round)
13. (England) Wayne Jones (first round)
14. (Netherlands) Vincent van der Voort (second round)
15. (England) Colin Lloyd (second round)
16. (Australia) Paul Nicholson (first round)
17. (England) Ronnie Baxter (first round)
18. (England) Mervyn King (first round)
19. (England) Andy Smith (first round)
20. (England) Justin Pipe (winner)
21. (England) Jamie Caven (first round)
22. (England) Denis Ovens (third round)
23. (Canada) John Part (first round)
24. (England) Colin Osborne (second round)
25. (England) Alan Tabern (second round)
26. (England) Dave Chisnall (semi-finals)
27. (England) Steve Brown (first round)
28. (Northern Ireland) Brendan Dolan (first round)
29. (Netherlands) Co Stompé (second round)
30. (England) Steve Beaton (second round)
31. (Scotland) Peter Wright (second round)
32. (Wales) Richie Burnett (quarter-finals)

UK Qualifier

- (England) Mick Todd (first round)
- (England) Mark Dudbridge (second round)
- (England) Scott Rand (first round)
- (England) Johnny Haines (first round)
- (England) Gaz Cousins (second round)
- (India) Prakash Jiwa (first round)
- (Wales) Steve Evans (second round)
- (Scotland) Jim Walker (second round)
- (England) Ian White (first round)
- (Republic of Ireland) William O'Connor (first round)
- (England) Joe Cullen (quarter-finals)
- (England) John Scott (first round)
- (England) James Richardson (quarter-finals)
- (England) Dean Winstanley (third round)
- (England) Michael Smith (second round)
- (England) Brian Woods (first round)
- (England) Ross Smith (first round)
- (England) Richie Howson (first round)
- (England) Arron Monk (first round)
- (England) Darren Webster (first round)

European Qualifier

- (Netherlands) Gino Vos (second round)
- (Netherlands) Mareno Michels (first round)
- (Netherlands) Roland Scholten (first round)
- (Belgium) Kim Huybrechts (third round)
- (Netherlands) Michael van Gerwen (third round)
- (Germany) Michael Rosenauer (first round)
- (Croatia) Boris Krčmar (first round)
- (Netherlands) Jelle Klaasen (first round)

Host Nation Qualifier

- (Austria) Mensur Suljović (first round)
- (Austria) Zoran Lerchbacher (first round)
- (Austria) Dietmar Burger (first round)
- (Austria) Martin Kurecka (first round)

== Draw ==
First round (best of 11 legs); 27 April
1	(England) Phil Taylor	w/d
(England) Gaz Cousins	w/o
32	(Wales) Richie Burnett	6
(Germany) Michael Rosenauer	4
16	(Australia) Paul Nicholson	3
(England) Dean Winstanley	6
17	(England) Ronnie Baxter	5
(Scotland) Jim Walker	6
8	(Wales) Mark Webster	6
(Netherlands) Jelle Klaasen	3
25	(England) Alan Tabern	6
(Austria) Zoran Lerchbacher	2
9	(Netherlands) Raymond van Barneveld	6
(England) Arron Monk	4
24	(England) Colin Osborne	6
(England) Richie Howson	4
5	(Australia) Simon Whitlock	6
(Netherlands) Mareno Michels	4
28	(Northern Ireland) Brendan Dolan	4
(England) Joe Cullen	6
12	(England) Mark Walsh	6
(England) Brian Woods	1
21	(England) Jamie Caven	4
(England) Michael Smith	6
4	(Scotland) Gary Anderson	6
(England) Scott Rand	4
29	(Netherlands) Co Stompé	6
(England) Ross Smith	3
13	(England) Wayne Jones	3
(Netherlands) Gino Vos	6
20	(England) Justin Pipe	6
(Austria) Mensur Suljović	2
2	(England) Adrian Lewis	w/d
(England) James Richardson	w/o
31	(Scotland) Peter Wright	6
(Republic of Ireland) William O'Connor	1
15	(England) Colin Lloyd	6
(England) Ian White	3
18	(England) Mervyn King	4
(Netherlands) Michael van Gerwen	6
7	(England) Andy Hamilton	6
(Netherlands) Roland Scholten	3
26	(England) Dave Chisnall	6
(Austria) Martin Kurecka	1
10	(England) Kevin Painter	6
(England) Johnny Haines	4
23	(Canada) John Part	5
(England) Mark Dudbridge	6
6	(England) Wes Newton	6
(Croatia) Boris Krčmar	4
27	(England) Steve Brown	2
(Wales) Steve Evans	6
11	(England) Terry Jenkins	6
(Austria) Dietmar Burger	3
22	(England) Denis Ovens	6
(England) John Scott	5
3	(England) James Wade	6
(India) Prakash Jiwa	3
30	(England) Steve Beaton	6
(England) Mick Todd	3
14	(Netherlands) Vincent van der Voort	6
(England) Darren Webster	3
19	(England) Andy Smith	3
(Belgium) Kim Huybrechts	6

Second round (best of 11 legs); 28 April
(England) Cousins 78.06	3
32	(Wales) Burnett 87.76	6
(England) Winstanley 96.92	6
(Scotland) Walker 97.59	5
8	(Wales) M. Webster 100.20	6
25	(England) Tabern 89.25	0
9	(Netherlands) van Barneveld 93.56	6
24	(England) Osborne 90.35	4
5	(Australia) Whitlock 93.69	4
(England) Cullen 93.63	6
12	(England) Walsh 86.81	6
(England) M. Smith 90.00	5
4	(Scotland) Anderson 96.42	6
29	(Netherlands) Stompé 89.75	2
(Netherlands) Vos 83.36	4
20	(England) Pipe 91.17	6
(England) Richardson 87.18	6
31	(Scotland) Wright 83.42	3
15	(England) Lloyd 91.79	1
(Netherlands) van Gerwen 104.70	6
7	(England) Hamilton 94.86	4
26	(England) Chisnall 96.28	6
10	(England) Painter 80.92	6
(England) Dudbridge 78.27	2
6	(England) Newton 97.00	6
(Wales) Evans 85.91	2
11	(England) Jenkins 83.01	3
22	(England) Ovens 84.94	6
3	(England) Wade 91.24	6
30	(England) Beaton 91.11	4
14	(Netherlands) van der Voort 79.48	0
(Belgium) Huybrechts 90.18	6

Third round (best of 11 legs); 29 April
32	(Wales) Burnett 97.34	6
(England) Winstanley 88.61	3
8	(Wales) M. Webster 86.97	2
9	(Netherlands) van Barneveld 102.57	6
(England) Cullen 97.99	6
12	(England) Walsh 86.09	4
4	(Scotland) Anderson 91.42	2
20	(England) Pipe 100.17	6
(England) Richardson 90.60	6
(Netherlands) van Gerwen 89.29	5
26	(England) Chisnall 113.09	6
10	(England) Painter 92.52	3
6	(England) Newton 89.31	6
22	(England) Ovens 86.34	3
3	(England) Wade 85.99	6
(Belgium) Huybrechts 74.97	1

Quarter-finals (best of 11 legs); 29 April
32	(Wales) Burnett 87.18	3
9	(Netherlands) van Barneveld 94.26	6
(England) Cullen 93.71	4
20	(England) Pipe 97.25	6
(England) Richardson 84.09	3
26	(England) Chisnall 91.12	6
6	(England) Newton 91.56	5
3	(England) Wade 97.06	6

Semi-finals (best of 11 legs); 29 April
9	(Netherlands) van Barneveld 93.27	3
20	(England) Pipe 107.42	6
26	(England) Chisnall 87.22	2
3	(England) Wade 88.37	6

Final (best of 11 legs); 29 April
20	Pipe 99.64	6
3	Wade 105.56	3
