= Mark Stephenson (darts player) =

English darts player

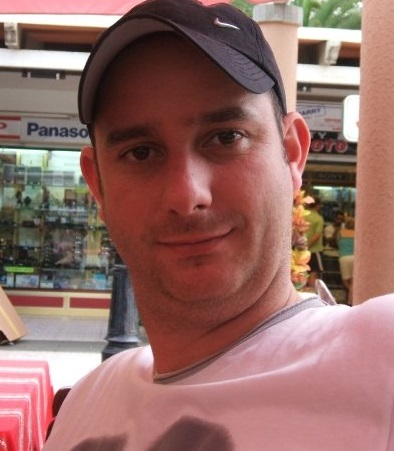
- Stephenson in 2008

Personal information
- Nickname: "Stevo"
- Born: 29 September 1976 (age 50) Yarm, England
- Home town: Newcastle, England

Sport
- Sport: Darts
- Playing since: 1994
- Darts: 22 Gram (custom made)
- Laterality: Right-handed
- Walk-on music: "Over the Hills and Far Away" by Gary Moore

Organisation (see split in darts)
- PDC: 2004–2020

PDC premier events – best performances
- World Championship: Last 64: 2009
- UK Open: Last 96: 2011

Mark Stephenson (born 29 September 1976) is an English former professional darts player who played in Professional Darts Corporation (PDC) events. He was formerly an official, working as a marker.

== Career ==
Stephenson fell one game short of qualifying for the 2007 PDC World Darts Championship, losing to Alan Tabern. He then fell two rounds short in qualifying for the 2008 PDC World Darts Championship, losing to Kirk Shepherd who eventually qualified and went on to reach the final. Stephenson finally qualified for the World Championship at the third time of asking, beating Jason Clark, Gary Welding and then Ray Farrell to earn one of the eight qualifying spots. He faced five-time world champion and the Number 2 seed Raymond van Barneveld in the first round, losing 3 sets to nil. Stephenson left the PDC in January 2020.

Mark currently works for Datadart.

== World Championship results ==
=== PDC ===
- 2009: 1st Round (lost to Raymond van Barneveld 0–3) (sets)
