= Toni Alcinas =

Spanish darts player (born 1979)

Personal information
- Full name: Antonio Alcinas Estelrich
- Nicknames: "The Samurai" "El Dartador"
- Born: 7 April 1979 (age 47) Campos, Mallorca, Spain

Sport
- Sport: Darts
- Playing since: 1995
- Darts: 18g Bull's Star Pleiades
- Laterality: Right-handed
- Walk-on music: "Back in Black" by AC/DC

Organisation (see split in darts)
- BDO: 2005–2009
- PDC: 2009–present

WDF major events – best performances
- World Masters: Last 24: 2008

PDC premier events – best performances
- World Championship: Last 16: 2018
- UK Open: Last 64: 2014
- European Championship: Last 32: 2010, 2010
- PC Finals: Last 64: 2017, 2018

Other tournament wins
- Years
PDC Challenge Tour	2021
Soft Tip NDA World Championship	2010
Spain National Championships	2009
Spanish Federation Cup	2005

Antonio Alcinas Estelrich (born 7 April 1979) is a Spanish darts player who competes in Professional Darts Corporation (PDC) events.

== Career ==
Alcinas started competing in PDC Europe events in 2010. After reaching the quarter-finals of a Players Championship in Haarlem in June 2010, he qualified for the European Championship via the PDC European Order of Merit. He was defeated 6–3 in the first round by Mark Walsh, despite hitting a 160 checkout to go 3–2 ahead. Alcinas is an accomplished soft-tip darts player and won the 2010 Soft Tip NDA World Championship.

He teamed up with Carlos Rodríguez to represent Spain at the 2010 PDC World Cup of Darts. They defeated Japan in the first round, before knocking out the top seeds England (represented by Phil Taylor and James Wade) 6–5 in the second round. In the group stage, they lost to Wales but defeated the United States and Scotland to qualify for the semi-finals, where they were whitewashed 0–4 by the Netherlands.

Alcinas qualified for his first PDC World Darts Championship in 2011. He lost 0–3 to James Wade in the first round.

Alcinas reached his first Players Championship final in January 2011, losing 4–6 to Ronnie Baxter in Halle, Germany. He qualified for the 2011 UK Open, defeating Mareno Michels in the first round before losing 0–4 to Michael Mansell in the second round. He also qualified for the 2011 European Championship, where he lost 2–6 to Kim Huybrechts in the first round.

In the 2012 PDC World Championship Alcinas was knocked out 2–3 in the first round by Andy Hamilton. He averaged 107.82 to win the first set and had two darts in the first leg of the deciding set to break throw, but missed and ultimately lost with an average of 98.76, which was the third highest average out of all the players in the first round. He again partnered Rodriguez in the 2012 PDC World Cup of Darts, but they could not repeat their success of 2010 as they were beaten 2–5 by South Africa in the first round. The rest of 2012 proved to be disappointing for Alcinas as he took part in 22 PDC ProTour events, with his best result being a last 32 loss to Dennis Priestley in the sixth UK Open Qualifier. In an attempt to qualify for the 2013 World Championship he was beaten in the semi-finals of the West European Qualifying by Stefan Couwenberg. After the World Championship Alcinas was ranked world number 60, inside the top 64 who retained their tour cards for 2013.

Alcinas played with Rodríguez for the third time in the World Cup of Darts and they qualified from Group D courtesy of a 5–3 win over Italy. They then repeated their 2010 shock win over the Scottish pair of Gary Anderson and Robert Thornton this time 5–4 and played Richie Burnett and Mark Webster in the quarter-finals. Alcinas missed four match darts in his singles tie against Webster to lose 4–3, but Rodríguez beat Burnett by the same scoreline to mean a doubles match was needed to settle the tie. Spain took an early 2–1 lead but went on to be defeated 4–2. His best result in an individual event in the rest of 2013 was a last 16 loss to Thornton in the final UK Open Qualifier. At the UK Open, Alcinas lost 5–3 to Darren Johnson in the preliminary round. Alcinas did not play the full schedule of PDC events and earned just £1,350 over the course of the year to plummet to 142nd in the world. He entered Q School in a bid to win his place on the tour back and succeeded on the first day by defeating Brian Woods 5–3 in his final match.

In March 2014, Alcinas beat Glenn Spearing and Matthew Edgar to reach the third round of the UK Open for the first time in his career where he was beaten 9–2 by Christian Kist. He advanced to the last 16 of an event for the first time in over a year at the seventh Players Championship courtesy of victories over Nigel Heydon, Mark Barilli and Stuart Kellett, before losing 6–3 to Keegan Brown. In the second round of the World Cup of Darts, Alcinas and Rodríguez lost their singles matches against the Dutch pair of Michael van Gerwen and Raymond van Barneveld to exit the tournament. He was knocked out at the same stage a year later this time partnering Cristo Reyes for the first time, as they lost to the Belgium brothers of Kim and Ronny Huybrechts. In individual events during 2015, Alcinas qualified for the International Darts Open and European Darts Grand Prix, but was eliminated in the first round of both. He reached the final of the South European Qualifier for the 2016 World Championship and lost 6–4 to John Michael.

In 2016, Alcinas reached the last 32 of both the 6th and 9th Players Championship events, losing 6–3 to Steve Brown in the former and 6–2 to Joe Cullen in the latter. He beat Kellett 6–1 in the opening round of the Gibraltar Darts Trophy, before going out 6–5 to Ian White in the second round. Alcinas and Reyes almost pulled off a shock in the first round of the World Cup as they lost 5–4 to England's Phil Taylor and Adrian Lewis.

In January 2017, Alcinas secured a new two-year PDC Tour Card by whitewashing Jimmy Hendriks 5–0 in the last round of the final day of Q School. Alcinas and Reyes were defeated 4–0 in the deciding doubles match in the second round of the World Cup to the Singapore team of Paul Lim and Harith Lim. At the 2018 PDC World Darts Championship he beat Reyes 3–1 to progress to the second round for the first time. He then beat Kevin Münch 4–1 to go into the Last 16, where he lost 4–0 to Darren Webster.

== World Championship performances ==
=== PDC ===
- 2011: First round (lost to James Wade 0–3)
- 2012: First round (lost to Andy Hamilton 2–3)
- 2018: Third round (lost to Darren Webster 0–4)
- 2019: Third round (lost to Benito van de Pas 2–4)

== Performance timeline ==
=== PDC ===
Tournament	2010	2011	2012	2013	2014	2017	2018	2019	2020	2022
World Championship	DNP	1R	1R	Did not qualify			3R	3R	DNQ	
UK Open	DNP	2R	2R	Prel.	3R	1R	2R	3R	3R	1R
European Championship	1R	1R	Did not qualify							
Players Championship Finals	DNP	Did not qualify				1R	1R	Did not qualify		

==== Players Championships ====
Season	1	2	3	4	5	6	7	8	9	10	11	12	13	14	15	16	17	18	19	20	21	22	23	24	25	26	27	28	29	30
2016	BAR; DNP					BAR; 3R	BAR; 1R	COV; 1R	COV; 3R	BAR; 1R	BAR; 1R	BAR; 1R	BAR; 1R	DNP			DUB; 1R	DUB; 1R	BAR; DNP											
2017	BAR; 2R	BAR; 2R	BAR; 1R	BAR; 1R	MIL; 1R	MIL; 1R	BAR; 1R	BAR; 3R	WIG; DNP		MIL; 1R	MIL; 3R	WIG; 2R	WIG; 3R	BAR; 1R	BAR; 1R	BAR; 1R	BAR; 2R	DUB; SF	DUB; 1R	BAR; 1R	BAR; QF								
2018	BAR; 2R	BAR; 2R	BAR; 1R	BAR; 2R	MIL; 1R	MIL; 1R	BAR; 1R	BAR; QF	WIG; 1R	WIG; 3R	MIL; 1R	MIL; 1R	WIG; 2R	WIG; 4R	BAR; 2R	BAR; 3R	BAR; 2R	BAR; 2R	DUB; 1R	DUB; 1R	BAR; 2R	BAR; 2R								
2019	WIG; 1R	WIG; 1R	WIG; 4R	WIG; 2R	BAR; 2R	BAR; 1R	WIG; 1R	WIG; 1R	BAR; 2R	BAR; 1R	BAR; 1R	BAR; 2R	BAR; 1R	BAR; 3R	BAR; 3R	BAR; 2R	WIG; 1R	WIG; 2R	BAR; 3R	BAR; 1R	HIL; 1R	HIL; 1R	BAR; 1R	BAR; 1R	BAR; 4R	BAR; 2R	DNP			
2020	BAR; 1R	BAR; 1R	WIG; 1R	WIG; 3R	WIG; 3R	WIG; 1R	BAR; 2R	Did not participate						NIE; 1R	NIE; 1R	NIE; 1R	NIE; 1R	NIE; 1R	COV; 4R	COV; 1R	COV; 1R	COV; 1R	COV; 3R							

Performance Table Legend
W	Won the tournament	F	Finalist	SF	Semifinalist	QF	Quarterfinalist	#R; RR; Prel.	Lost in # round Round-robin; Preliminary round	DQ	Disqualified
DNQ	Did not qualify	DNP	Did not participate	WD	Withdrew	NH	Tournament not held	#R; RR; Prel.	Lost in # round Round-robin; Preliminary round	NYF	Not yet founded
