= Steve Grubb =

English darts player

Personal information
- Full name: Stephen Grubb
- Nickname: Grubby
- Born: 19 September 1968 (age 58) Bristol, England

Sport
- Sport: Darts
- Playing since: 1988
- Darts: 29g Harrows
- Laterality: Right-handed
- Walk-on music: "Cotton Eye Joe" by Rednex

Organisation (see split in darts)
- PDC: 2006–2015
- WDF: 2020–2025

PDC premier events – best performances
- World Championship: Last 64: 2009
- UK Open: Last 32: 2009

Steve Grubb (born 19 September 1968) is a former English professional darts player who has played in the Professional Darts Corporation (PDC) events, he was nicknamed Grubby.

== Career ==
Grubb fell two games short of qualifying for the 2006 World Matchplay, losing to Andy Hamilton who eventually qualified. He then fell one game short of qualifying for the 2007 PDC World Darts Championship. Having beaten Tom Kirby and Paul Williams, he lost in the final game to Wayne Atwood. In 2008, Grubb secured his best ever performance in the PDC Pro Tour, reaching the last 16 in the Players Championship in Las Vegas, beating David Fatum and Tony Ayres before losing to Mark Frost. Then reached the 1/4's in a pro tour event in Scotland losing a narrow game to Michael Van Gerwen.

Grubb made amends after missing out in the 2007 World Championship by claiming one of eight places for the 2009 PDC World Darts Championship, beating England Martin Whatmough, Hong Kong-born American Isen Veljic to qualify. He was drawn against number 1 seed Phil Taylor in the first round but lost the match 3–0.

He ran a Darts team in the Somerset Super League called Radstock where he played with close friend and 1992 World Champion runner-up Mike Gregory. He now runs the Wellington arms at rooks bridge and still plays in the Somerset super league.

Grubb rejoined the WDF in 2020 playing in the Las Vegas open, getting to the semifinal before losing narrowly to Chris Lim. He quit the WDF in 2025.

== World Championship Results ==
=== PDC ===
- 2009: 1st Round (lost to Phil Taylor 0–3) (sets)
