= Wayne Atwood =

Welsh darts player

Personal information
- Nickname: "Celtic Warrior"
- Born: 24 July 1964 (age 62) Cardiff, Wales
- Home town: Caerphilly, Wales

Sport
- Sport: Darts
- Playing since: 1986
- Darts: 22g Celtic Warrior Pros Red Dragon
- Laterality: Right-handed
- Walk-on music: "Neon Knights" by Black Sabbath

Organisation (see split in darts)
- PDC: 2002–2016

WDF major events – best performances
- World Trophy: Last 32: 2007

PDC premier events – best performances
- World Championship: Last 32: 2004
- UK Open: Last 32: 2005, 2010

Other tournament wins
- Tournament: Years
- Luctonians Open: 2009

Wayne Atwood (born 24 July 1964) is a Welsh former professional darts player. Nicknamed Celtic Warrior, he formerly competed in Professional Darts Corporation (PDC) events.

== Career ==
He qualified for the PDC World Championship on two occasions – reaching the last 32 in 2004.

He achieved his first major success in June 2007 by winning the Thailf Open (a non-ranked PDC event) and a €2,400 cheque. He defeated former World Champion John Part on his way to the final where he beat Gary Welding for the trophy.

On 16 April 2011, Atwood achieved a nine-dart finish in the first round of the 2011 UK Open Qualifier 5 in Barnsley against Nigel Heydon, making him the first Welshman to hit a nine-darter in a PDC tournament.

== World Championship results ==
=== PDC ===
- 2004: Last 32: (lost to Peter Manley 3–4) (sets)
- 2007: Last 64: (lost to Chris Mason 0–3)
