= Steve Evans (darts player) =

Welsh darts player

Personal information
- Nickname: "The Outlaw"
- Born: 7 January 1972 (age 54) Cardiff, Wales
- Home town: Pennal, Wales

Sport
- Sport: Darts
- Playing since: 1991
- Darts: 22g Red Dragon
- Laterality: Right-handed
- Walk-on music: "Highway to Hell" by AC/DC

Organisation (see split in darts)
- PDC: 2003–2020

PDC premier events – best performances
- World Championship: Last 64: 2008, 2011
- UK Open: Last 32: 2004

Other tournament wins
- Tournament: Years
- Rileys Chester Open Wales National Championships: 2011; 1991

Steve Evans (born 7 January 1972) is a Welsh former professional darts player who played in Professional Darts Corporation (PDC) events.

== Career ==
Evans joined the PDC in 2003, and reached the last 32 of the 2004 UK Open, beating Andy Belton, Dale Pinch & Ian Covill, before eventually losing to John MaGowan.

He qualified for the 2008 PDC World Darts Championship, losing 0–3 to Steve Beaton in the first round. He also qualified for the 2011 World Championship, again losing 0–3 in the first round to Simon Whitlock.

After coming dangerously close to having to pack in the game due to the financial restraints of touring, Steve announced on 21 March 2012 that he has acquired a full sponsor to continue his PDC career. In April, he earned a place in the European Tour Event 1 in Vienna by defeating Ian Jopling and Jamie Lewis in the UK qualifier. He played Steve Brown in the first round and won 6–2, but then lost to Wes Newton 2–6 in round two. This later proved to be Evans' best result of 2012 and earned him £1,000. He also qualified for the second European Tour event, held in Berlin, with a win over John Henderson in the UK qualifier. He faced Brown again in the first round and this time lost 3–6. Evans has not competed in a PDC event since this defeat. After the 2013 PDC World Championship he was ranked world number 79, outside of the top 64 who retain their places on the PDC tour. He did not enter Q School and has therefore lost his PDC tour card for 2013. Evans was knocked out in the quarter-finals of the 2014's first Challenge Tour event 5–1 by Matthew Edgar. He did not play in an event in 2015 and only entered five in 2016.

Steve quit the PDC in January 2020.

== World Championship results ==
=== PDC ===
- 2008: First round (lost to Steve Beaton 0–3) (sets)
- 2011: First round (lost to Simon Whitlock 0–3)
