= Shaun Griffiths =

Former English darts player

Personal information
- Nickname: "The Miracle"
- Born: 24 November 1991 (age 34) Manchester, England
- Home town: Partington, England

Sport
- Sport: Darts
- Playing since: 2003
- Darts: Shaun Griffiths 23 gram Red Dragon
- Laterality: Right-handed
- Walk-on music: "Lets Get Ready to Rumble!" by Jock Jam

Organisation (see split in darts)
- BDO: 2007–2011
- PDC: 2011–2013

WDF major events – best performances
- World Championship: Last 32: 2011
- World Masters: Last 136: 2010

PDC premier events – best performances
- UK Open: Last 64: 2012

Other tournament wins
- Years
British Teenage Open	2010
Chorlton Open	2010
Denton Open	2010
Droylsden Open	2011
Littleborough Open	2010
PDC Challenge Tour England	2015, 2015
PDC Development Tour England	2011
Southport Open	2010
WDF Europe Youth Cup	2008
World Youth Masters	2007, 2008
- Updated on 20 November 2021

Shaun Griffiths (born 24 November 1991) is an English professional darts player who plays in Professional Darts Corporation (PDC) events.

== Career ==
Griffiths won consecutive Winmau World Youth Masters titles in 2007 and 2008. In 2010, he won the British Teenage Open and reached the quarter-finals of the 2011 PDC Under-21 World Championship, losing 3–4 to Michael van Gerwen. Griffiths qualified for the 2011 BDO World Darts Championship by defeating John Henderson, John Lakeman and Andy Boulton. In the first round he lost 0–3 in sets to Joey ten Berge.

Griffiths qualified for the 2011 PDC Pro Tour as one of four semi-finalists from the first day of the Q School. His best result of the year came at the Bobby Bourn Memorial Players Championship, when he lost to James Wade in the last 16.

He is sponsored by the Sky Sports darts commentator John Gwynne. He works as a sales assistant at the Trafford Centre and supports Manchester City F.C.

== World Championship results ==
=== BDO ===
- 2011: First round (lost to Joey ten Berge 0–3) (sets)
