= Mark Jones (darts player) =

English darts player

Personal information
- Nickname: "Little Man"
- Born: 21 April 1970 (age 56) Dudley, England
- Home town: Brierley Hill, England

Sport
- Sport: Darts
- Playing since: 2000
- Darts: 26 Gram Copper Tungsten
- Laterality: Right-handed
- Walk-on music: "Weapon of Choice" by Fatboy Slim

Organisation (see split in darts)
- BDO: 2004-2005
- PDC: 2005–2015

PDC premier events – best performances
- World Championship: Last 64: 2013
- UK Open: Last 64: 2011

Other tournament wins
- Years
Gibraltar Open	2004

Mark Jones (born 21 April 1970) is an English former professional darts player.

== Career ==
Jones made his television debut at the 2011 UK Open at the Reebok Stadium in Bolton. He lost out 4–9 Colin Osborne in the last 64 earning himself £1,000 in the process. Jones best result to date was reaching the semi-finals at the 2012 UK Open Qualifier 3 in March, defeating the likes of Vincent van der Voort and Jelle Klaasen before losing 6–4 to Brendan Dolan.

Jones qualified for the 2013 World Championship by finishing 46th on the ProTour Order of Merit, claiming the 15th of 16 places that were awarded to the highest non-qualified players. In his first appearance at the World Championship he lost to Brendan Dolan 3–0 (sets) in the first round, winning just a single leg. Jones failed to qualify for the 2013 UK Open as he finished 142nd on the Order of Merit, outside of the top 96 who claimed their places. He had a disappointing year as he played the full PDC calendar but couldn't advance past the last 32 in any event. Jones began 2014 ranked 65th on the Order of Merit, just outside the top 64 who retained their places for the year ahead and he therefore entered Q School in a bid to regain his tour status. However, he could only win two matches during the four days to only have PDPA Associate Member status for 2014 which gave him entry to UK Open and European Tour qualifiers as well as the Challenge Tour. Jones played all 16 of the Challenge Tour tournaments with his best finishes coming in the last two events when he was a losing quarter-finalist.

A last 32 appearance in the sixth qualifier helped Jones play in the first round of the 2015 UK Open, but he lost 5–3 to Jason Wilson. He has now not played in a PDC event since May 2015.

== Outside of darts ==
Jones is a plasterer by trade.

== World Championship results ==
=== PDC ===
- 2013: First round (lost to Brendan Dolan 0–3) (sets)
