= Shane O'Connor (darts player) =

Irish darts player

Personal information
- Nickname: "Maverick"
- Born: 4 December 1985 (age 40) Dublin, Ireland
- Home town: Tallaght, Ireland

Sport
- Sport: Darts
- Playing since: 2004
- Darts: 24 gram Unicorn George noble
- Laterality: Right-handed
- Walk-on music: "The Boys Are Back in Town" by Thin Lizzy

Organisation (see split in darts)
- BDO: 2004-2006
- PDC: 2006–2018 (Tour Card: 2011)

WDF major events – best performances
- World Masters: Last 192: 2006

PDC premier events – best performances
- World Championship: Last 70: 2009
- UK Open: Last 96: 2011

Other tournament wins
- Tournament: Years
- Ireland Players Championship PDC Qualifying School Irish Qualifier Sky Bets Tournament Kells Co Kilkenny Tom Kirby Memorial Trophy West Coast Classic: 2010 2010 2010 2008 2013

Shane O'Connor (born 4 December 1985) is an Irish former professional darts player who played in Professional Darts Corporation events.

== Darts career ==
O'Connor won the 2008 Irish Matchplay which earned him a place in the 2009 PDC World Darts Championship. He later reached the semi-finals of the Gleneagle Irish Masters, beating Jacko Barry 4-0 and Tony Eccles 5–0, eventually losing 5-4 to the eventual winner Michael van Gerwen.

O'Connor was drawn against David Fatum in the preliminary round, being beaten 6–4.

He won a 2-year PDC Tour Card at Q-School in 2011 but declined the card for the 2012 season, with his place reallocated via the Q-School Order of Merit.

== World Championship results ==
=== PDC ===
- 2008: Last 70 (lost to David Fatum 4-6) (legs)

== Personal life ==
O'Connor was not a full-time professional and makes his living as a scaffolder.

== Performance timeline ==
Tournament	2006	2007	2008	2009	2010	2011
PDC Ranked televised events
PDC World Championship	DNQ		PR	DNQ		
UK Open	DNQ					2R
BDO Ranked televised events
World Masters	1R	DNP				
Career statistics
Year-end ranking (PDC)	-	-	-	103	-	106

PDC Players Championships

Season	1	2	3	4	5	6	7	8	9	10	11	12	13	14	15	16	17	18	19	20	21	22	23	24	25	26	27	28	29	30	31	32
2007	Did not participate																	KIL; 1R	DNP													
2008	Did not participate																							DUB; 2R	DUB; 2R	IRV; 2R	IRV; 3R	KIR; DNP	KIL; 3R	LEI; DNP		
2009	Did not participate																		LVE; 2R	Did not participate						DUB; 3R	DUB; 1R	KIL; 1R	NUL; DNP		IRV; 1R	IRV; 1R
2011	HAL; 3R	HAL; 2R	DER; 2R	DER; 2R	CRA; 2R	CRA; 2R	VIE; 1R	VIE; 1R	CRA; DNP		BAR; 2R	BAR; 2R	NUL; 2R	NUL; 2R	DNP						DUB; 3R	DUB; 2R	KIL; 1R	DNP				CRA; 1R	CRA; 2R	WIG; DNP		
2013 (Note: Not a Tour card holder)	Did not participate										KIL; PR	KIL; PR	DNP																			

Performance Table Legend
W	Won the tournament	F	Finalist	SF	Semifinalist	QF	Quarterfinalist	#R; RR; Prel.	Lost in # round Round-robin; Preliminary round	DQ	Disqualified
DNQ	Did not qualify	DNP	Did not participate	WD	Withdrew	NH	Tournament not held	#R; RR; Prel.	Lost in # round Round-robin; Preliminary round	NYF	Not yet founded
