= Michael Rosenauer =

German darts player

Personal information
- Nickname: "ROSI 501"
- Born: 13 July 1966 (age 60) Bad Nauheim, Germany
- Home town: Gütersloh, Germany

Sport
- Sport: Darts
- Playing since: 1985
- Darts: 22g Unicorn Darts Signature
- Laterality: Right-handed
- Walk-on music: "Remember the Name" by Fort Minor ft. Styles of Beyond

Organisation (see split in darts)
- BDO: 1990–2006
- PDC: 2006–

WDF major events – best performances
- World Masters: Last 16: 2006
- World Trophy: Last 40: 2007

PDC premier events – best performances
- World Championship: Last 64: 2008
- UK Open: Last 160: 2011
- European Championship: Last 32: 2012

Other tournament wins
- Years
Dart-mp.com Classic	2010
Dortmund Open	2006, 2007
GDC Halle	2007
GDC Hürth bei Köln	2007
GDC Niedernhausen	2008
GDC Ramada Hotel Köln	2007, 2008
GDC Salzdetfurth	2007
Malta Open	2006
PDC World Germany Qualifying Event	2010

Michael Rosenauer (born 13 July 1966) is a German professional darts player who plays in Professional Darts Corporation (PDC) events.

== Career ==
Rosenauer created controversy when he chose to play in the 2008 PDC World Darts Championship, having won qualification for the 2008 BDO World Darts Championship. Rosenauer claimed one of the places for the event at the Lakeside, but at the same time, he topped the German Darts Corporation Order of Merit, which grants a place in the PDC World Championship and in the end, he withdrew from the BDO World Championship to play in the PDC version instead. He went on to lose in the first round to Mervyn King.

In 2012, Rosenauer earned a place in the European Tour Event 1 in Vienna by defeating Alexander Tauber and Tomas Seyler in the European qualifier. He played Richie Burnett in the first round and lost 4–6. Rosenauer also qualified for the second European Tour event in June, with wins over Karsten Kornath and Jyhan Artut in the Home Nation Qualifier. He beat world number 8 Andy Hamilton in the first round 6–4, before losing to Dave Chisnall 1–6 in round two. Rosenauer lost to Ronnie Baxter 1–6 in the first round of the 2012 European Championship. In an attempt to reach the 2013 World Championship, Rosenauer was defeated 5–6 by Dragutin Horvat in the quarter-finals of the Central European Qualifier. Rosenauer was ranked world number 78 after the event, outside of the top 64 who retain their tour cards for 2013.

In the next two years Rosenauer curtailed his darts schedule and only competed in European Tour events. In 2014 he qualified for the European Darts Open, European Darts Grand Prix and European Darts Trophy, losing in the second round of the first two and the opening round of the latter. He did attempt to qualify for the 2015 UK Open but could not win enough games. Rosenauer qualified for the European Darts Open, but lost 6–5 to Jamie Lewis in the first round.

== World Championship results ==
=== PDC ===
- 2008: Last 64 (lost to Mervyn King 2–3) (sets)
