= Scott Rand =

English darts player

Personal information
- Nickname: Cool Hand
- Born: 4 July 1975 (age 51) Coventry, England

Sport
- Sport: Darts
- Playing since: 1995
- Darts: 23g Target Perfect Storm Darts
- Laterality: Right-handed
- Walk-on music: Moves like Jagger by Maroon 5

Organisation (see split in darts)
- PDC: 2010–2014

PDC premier events – best performances
- World Championship: Last 32: 2012, 2013
- World Matchplay: Last 32: 2011
- UK Open: Last 64: 2012, 2013
- PC Finals: Semi-final: 2011

Other tournament wins
- Years
Coventry Open	2011
Midland Open	2012

Scott Rand (born 4 July 1975) is an English former professional darts player who competed in Professional Darts Corporation (PDC) events.

== Career ==
Rand joined the PDC in April 2010, and within a month qualified for the UK Open. He defeated Andy Murray and Jyhan Artut before losing to Tony Broughton in the last 96.

In May 2011, he reached the semi-finals of a Players Championship event in Crawley. This result helped him to qualify for the 2011 World Matchplay, where he lost 6–10 to Wayne Jones in the first round.

Rand qualified for the 2011 Players Championship Finals in November. He beat Jamie Caven 6–2 in the first round, five-time World champion Raymond van Barneveld 8–6 in the second round, and multiple major winner James Wade 9–5 in the quarter-final. In the semi-final, he led eventual champion Kevin Painter 9–6 and had two darts at double-16 for the match, but left both of them on the wire as Painter came back to win. Nevertheless, his performance left him with a cheque for £15,000 and on the cusp of a place in the top 32.

=== 2012 ===
Rand made his PDC World Championship debut in 2012, beating Andy Smith 3–0 in the first round, without dropping a leg. He played Colin Lloyd in the second round and was beaten 1–4. In April, he qualified for his PDC European Tour debut at the 2012 Austrian Darts Open by defeating Keith Stephen and Nigel Heydon in the UK qualifier. He played Gary Anderson in the first round and lost 4–6. Rand reached the last 64 of the UK Open where he lost 6–9 to Andy Smith. He also qualified for the third 2012 European DartsO Open with wins over John Henderson and Paul Rowley, and then received a bye through to the second round of the event in Düsseldorf due to Gary Anderson withdrawing. There he played Richie Burnett and lost 3–6. At the fifth European Tour Event, the 2012 Dutch Darts Masters, Rand saw off Lloyd 6–3 in the first round, before being whitewashed 0–6 by Andy Smith in round two.

=== 2013 ===
Rand qualified for the 2013 World Championship by finishing 37th on the 2012 ProTour Order of Merit, claiming the seventh of sixteen spots that were awarded to non-qualified players. He played the runner-up of the previous major, the Players Championship Finals, Kim Huybrechts in the first round and came back from 2–1 down in sets to triumph 3–2 in a high quality match. Rand played Wes Newton in the next round and was beaten 4–0. He lost 9–7 to John Henderson in the third round of the UK Open. Rand reached his first semi-final on the Pro Tour in almost a year in September at the eighth Players Championship which was undoubtedly highlighted with a 6–2 win against Michael van Gerwen in the second round. However, he was whitewashed 6–0 in the semis by Simon Whitlock as he averaged just 78.57. Rand missed out on qualifying for the 2014 World Championship by just £500 on the ProTour Order of Merit.

=== 2014 ===
Rand played in all six of the 2014 UK Open qualifiers but couldn't win beyond the last 128 in any of them as he failed to reach the main stage of the tournament for the first time since turning professional. He reached the last 32 of two tournaments in the following months, but has not played in a PDC event since July.

== Personal life ==
Rand worked as a lorry driver before turning professional.

== World Championship results ==
=== PDC ===
- 2012: Second round (lost to Colin Lloyd 1–4)
- 2013: Second round (lost to Wes Newton 0–4)
