= Mick Todd =

English darts player

Personal information
- Nickname: "The Business"
- Born: 6 June 1972 (age 54) Newark-on-Trent, England
- Home town: Newark-on-Trent, England

Sport
- Sport: Darts
- Playing since: 1990
- Darts: 26g
- Laterality: Right-handed
- Walk-on music: "The Man" by The Killers

Organisation (see split in darts)
- PDC: 2009–2021

PDC premier events – best performances
- UK Open: Last 64: 2014, 2017

Mick Todd (born 6 June 1972) is an English former professional darts player who played in Professional Darts Corporation (PDC) events.

He earned a PDC Tour Card in 2011 and 2014, and qualified for the 2014 UK Open and 2017 UK Open, but lost in the third round on both occasions. He beat 2018 NUDL Singles semi-finalist Jack "On The Beers" Mears in the first round of the 2019 Riley's UK Open Qualifiers.

Todd left the PDC in 2021.
