= Steve Brown (darts player, born 1981) =

English darts player (born 1981)

Personal information
- Nickname: "Bomber"
- Born: 25 January 1981 (age 45) Bristol, England

Sport
- Sport: Darts
- Playing since: 1995
- Darts: 22g Winmau Signatures
- Laterality: Right-handed
- Walk-on music: "War" by Edwin Starr

Organisation (see split in darts)
- PDC: 2006–2018, 2020–2022

PDC premier events – best performances
- World Championship: Last 32: 2011
- World Matchplay: Last 16: 2010
- World Grand Prix: Last 16: 2010
- UK Open: Last 32: 2008
- US Open/WSoD: Last 64: 2007
- PC Finals: Last 16: 2011

Other tournament wins
- Years
| Cheltenham Open | 2011 |
| Southern Counties Open | 2013, 2015 |
| UK Open Qualifier | 2011 |

Other achievements
- 9 Dart Finish: PDPA Players Championship Crawley 2013

Steven Brown (born 25 January 1981) is an English professional darts player who formerly competed in Professional Darts Corporation (PDC) events.

== Career ==
Brown first competed on the PDC Pro Tour in 2006, with his best performances coming in the 2007 Windy City Open in Chicago and the 2007 UK Open Irish Regional where he reached the quarter-finals. He also made it to the last 16 of the 2007 Peachtree Open and 2007 Hayling Island PDPA Players Championship.

His consistency on the Pro Tour during 2007 saw him qualify for the 2008 PDC World Darts Championship for the first time. He was the fifth highest ranked player on the Pro Tour of those who had not sealed an automatic place in the tournament. Having started the year at 613 in the world rankings—he had climbed to 76th by November. He lost to Chris Mason in the first round.

Brown next qualified for the World Championship in 2010, losing to James Wade 3–1 in the first round. 2010 was a breakthrough year for Brown, as he reached the second round of both the World Matchplay and the World Grand Prix. He also reached the second round of the 2011 PDC World Darts Championship, defeating Jelle Klaasen to secure a second-round match with Terry Jenkins, which he lost 4–1.

In February 2011, Brown won his first PDC ranking title by defeating Ian White 6–3 in the final of UK Open Qualifier 1. In April, he climbed into the top 32 of the PDC Order of Merit for the first time.

At the 2012 World Championship Brown lost in the first round to South African qualifier Devon Petersen 3–2 in sets, having led 2–1 and had a dart at the bullseye to win the match. In the rest of 2012, Brown performed well in the five new European Tour events by qualifying for four of them. He lost in the last 64 once, the last 32 twice and saved his best run for the final event, the Dutch Darts Masters where he defeated Dick van Dijk 6–5 and Wes Newton 6–2, before losing to Mark Walsh 6–3 in the last 16.

It was largely thanks to these results that he reached the 2013 World Championship by finishing 41st on the ProTour Order of Merit, taking the 11th of 16 spots that were awarded to the highest non-qualified players. Brown lost to Terry Jenkins 0–3 in the first round. After the tournament, Brown was ranked world number 36. He lost 5–4 to Adrian Gray in the first round of the 2013 UK Open. At the fifth Players Championship of the year, Brown threw a nine-dart finish during a 6–2 second round win over Connie Finnan, but lost 6–0 to Joe Cullen in the next round. At the Gibraltar Darts Trophy he hit six doubles from eight attempts to defeat Brendan Dolan 6–4 and then beat Paul Nicholson 6–3, before being whitewashed 6–0 by youngster Jamie Lewis in the third round. He reached the same stage of the German Darts Championship with impressive 6–2 wins over both Gary Anderson and Ian White, but lost by a reverse of this scoreline to Richie Burnett. These two results made up almost half of Brown's prize money in 2013 and he earned the final spot for the 2014 World Championship through the ProTour Order of Merit. Brown played 27th seed Andy Smith in the opening round and missed one dart to take a 2–0 set lead. In the third set Brown wired a dart at double 12 to fall agonisingly close to hitting the third nine-dart finish of the event. He did get the double in his next visit to take the leg in 10 darts but this was the last leg he could win in the match as he was beaten 3–1. He dropped 10 places over the course of the year to begin 2014 ranked world number 46.

Brown lost 5–4 to Ewan Hyslop in the first round of the 2014 UK Open and had to wait until the penultimate Players Championship of the year to reach the last 16 for the only time this season. He knocked out Dave Ladley, James Wade and Jelle Klaasen, before Adrian Lewis defeated him 6–3.

In 2015 he missed out on qualifying for the UK Open for the first time since 2006. He won the Southern Counties Open with a 6–5 victory over Andy Jenkins. Brown had a poor year on the Pro Tour as he only reached the last 32 on two occasions.

Brown had to enter Q School in 2016 as he had dropped out of the top 64 on the Order of Merit. He reached the last 16 on the second day but overall did not do enough to secure a tour card, giving him a limited selection of events for the year ahead. He didn't qualify for the UK Open, but at the sixth Players Championship he beat Joe Cullen, James Richardson, Antonio Alcinas, James Wilson and Simon Whitlock to reach the semi-finals of an event for the first time in nearly five years. He was defeated 6–3 by Josh Payne. Brown also got to the last 32 and last 16 in two other events to qualify for the Players Championship Finals, where he will play Mensur Suljović.

In January 2020, despite missing the final day of PDC Pro Tour Qualifying School (Q-School) due to his commitments as Chairman of the Junior Darts Corporation (JDC), Brown regained a two-year PDC Tour Card by finishing tenth on the UK Q School Order of Merit. He played on the Pro Tour again in 2020 and 2021, but lost his card at the end of 2021.

== Outside of darts ==
Brown began taking up darts around 1995, and prior to becoming a full-time professional, he made his living as a plasterer. He is a fan of Bristol City and is married with four children. His son, John Brown, joined him on the PDC Pro Tour after winning a Tour Card at the 2021 Q-School.

The darts that Steve Brown is now using are 22 gram custom-made Laserdarts. Horizon Darts, Inc (USA), makers of Laserdarts, is one of Steve's sponsors.

In 2010 Brown also founded the Steve Brown Darts Academy for kids between the ages of 8 and 16 with multiple venues across the UK. This has now become the Junior Darts Corporation and it is officially partnered with the PDC.

== World Championship results ==
=== PDC ===
- 2008: First round (lost to Chris Mason 1–3)
- 2010: First round (lost to James Wade 1–3)
- 2011: Second round (lost to Terry Jenkins 1–4)
- 2012: First round (lost to Devon Petersen 2–3)
- 2013: First round (lost to Terry Jenkins 0–3)
- 2014: First round (lost to Andy Smith 1–3)

== Performance timeline ==
| Tournament | 2007 | 2008 | 2009 | 2010 | 2011 | | 2012 | 2013 | 2014 | 2015 | 2016 | 2017 | 2018 | 2019 | 2020 |
|---|---|---|---|---|---|---|---|---|---|---|---|---|---|---|---|
| PDC World Championship | DNQ | 1R | DNQ | 1R | 2R | | 1R | 1R | 1R | DNQ | | | | DNP | DNP |
| UK Open | 3R | 4R | 3R | 2R | 3R | | 1R | 1R | 1R | DNQ | | | DNP | DNP | 1R |
| World Matchplay | DNQ | | | 2R | 1R | | DNQ | | | | DNP | | | | DNQ |
| World Grand Prix | DNQ | | | 2R | 1R | | DNQ | | | | DNP | | | | DNQ |
| Players Championship Finals | DNQ | | | | 1R | 2R | DNQ | | | | 1R | DNP | | | |
Career statistics
| Year-end ranking | 59 | 58 | 57 | 36 | 27 | | 36 | 46 | 60 | 116 | 91 | 112 | 162 | - | 122 |

Performance Table Legend
| W | Won the tournament | F | Finalist | SF | Semifinalist | QF | Quarterfinalist | #R; RR; L# | Lost in # round Round-robin; Last # stage | DQ | Disqualified |
| DNQ | Did not qualify | DNP | Did not participate | WD | Withdrew | NH | Tournament not held | #R; RR; L# | Lost in # round Round-robin; Last # stage | NYF | Not yet founded |
