= Nigel Heydon =

English darts player

Personal information
- Nickname: "The Undertaker"
- Born: 22 July 1970 (age 56) London, England
- Home town: Leamington Spa, England

Sport
- Sport: Darts
- Playing since: 1984
- Darts: 27 Gram A180 signature dart
- Laterality: Right-handed
- Walk-on music: "Going Underground" by The Jam

Organisation (see split in darts)
- BDO: 2008–2009, 2018–2020
- PDC: 2010–2017
- WDF: 2018–

WDF major events – best performances
- World Championship: Last 32: 2019
- World Masters: Last 32: 2018

PDC premier events – best performances
- World Championship: Last 64: 2011, 2012
- UK Open: Last 16: 2010
- Grand Slam: Last 32 Group Stages: 2011

Other tournament wins
- Years
Cotgrave Open	2010
Grand Slam Wild Card Qualifier	2011
Mackadown Open	2011
Strichley Open	2011
Yardley and District Winter Warmer	2010

Nigel Heydon (born 22 July 1970) is an English professional darts player who plays in British Darts Organisation (BDO) events.

== Career ==
Heydon qualified for the 2007 UK Open as an amateur qualifier, losing in the first round to John Burton. He also reached the last 40 of the 2009 World Masters.

Heydon joined the PDC in 2010, and quickly made an impact, reaching a semi-final in his second Pro Tour event in Gibraltar. He also qualified for the 2010 UK Open. Entering at the last 64, he defeated Mark Dudbridge and Wayne Atwood before losing to Wes Newton in the last 16.

He narrowly missed out on qualification for the 2010 World Matchplay, but did qualify for his first PDC World Championship in 2011. He lost 1–3 in sets to Robert Thornton in the first round, despite having darts to level the match at 2–2.

Heydon qualified for the 2011 Grand Slam of Darts after reaching the final of the Wildcard qualifier. He opened his campaign with a surprise 5–3 victory over Premier League champion Gary Anderson.

At the 2012 World Championship Heydon almost pulled off a huge upset by knocking out reigning champion Adrian Lewis. He led 2–0 in the best of five sets match only for Lewis to regain parity at 2–2. In the deciding set Heydon had three darts to move into a 2–0 lead but missed them and Lewis would ultimately be victorious. Lewis admitted after the match that Heydon had been "phenomenal" in the first two sets. In August, Heydon beat Brandon Walsh and Gary Butcher in the UK Qualifier for the European Tour Event 4, and defeated Andy Smith 6–5 in the first round in Stuttgart. Heydon continued his form in round two with a 6–2 win over Mark Walsh with a 100.45 average, but then lost to James Wade 4–6 in the last 16. Heydon's best results of 2012 came after this as he reached the quarter-finals of both the 12th and 16th Players Championship events, losing to Andy Hamilton (5–6) and Jamie Caven (0–6) respectively. He finished the season 57th on the ProTour Order of Merit, missing out on qualification for the World Championship by £800.

Heydon began 2013 by qualifying for the UK Masters and beat James Hubbard 6–4, before losing 6–5 to Dave Chisnall in the second round. He reached the same stage of the Austrian Darts Open where James Wade won 6–1. Heydon was a last 32 loser in four of the eight UK Open qualifiers to enter the event in the second round where he was edged out 5–4 by Andy Jenkins. He started 2014 ranked world number 71, outside of the top 64 who retained their places on the tour and Heydon therefore entered Q School in a bid to win his spot back. On the fourth and final day he beat Stuart Anderson 5–0 in the last round to earn a tour card. Heydon had changed his throwing style in the previous 18 months due to back problems and has also begun wearing glasses but stated afterwards that he was adapting to the changes and hopeful for further successes in the future.

In February 2014, Heydon enjoyed his best run in an event in 16 months by reaching the last 16 of the fifth UK Open Qualifier with victories over the likes of Mark Walsh and Richie Burnett, but lost 6–3 to eventual winner Gary Anderson. At the UK Open itself he beat Johnny Haines 5–4 and Steve Maish 9–1, before losing 9–7 against Brendan Dolan in the fourth round. His form continued at the third Players Championship as he reached the semi-finals of a PDC event for the second time in his career by whitewashing John Part and also beating Ian White and Ronnie Baxter, before Phil Taylor defeated Heydon 6–0. Heydon could not get past the last 64 in any other event during the rest of the season.

Heydon began 2015 70th in the world rankings and so entered Q School in a bid to earn a two-year PDC tour card. He was successful on the first day by defeating Jim Walker 5–3 in the final round. The highlight of Heydon's year undoubtedly came at the 11th Players Championship event in May, when he overcame Darren Johnson, Alan Norris, Mark Dudbridge, John Bowles and Jelle Klaasen to play in the semi-finals, where he lost 6–4 to Dave Chisnall. Other than that, Heydon was unable to get past the last 32 of any event in 2015.

In 2016, he qualified for the Austrian Darts Open, where he made the quarter-finals by beating Roxy-James Rodriguez 6–4, reigning World Grand Prix champion Robert Thornton 6–5 and number six seed Ian White 6–0. Heydon was defeated 6–4 by Michael Smith. This was by far his best finish of the season as he only reached the last 32 twice in all the other events he played in.

In 2018 Nigel Heydon was active on the British Darts Organisation circuit. He played for England in the British International Championships (darts), Six Nations Cup & was named in the 4 man squad for the WDF Europe Cup. He also qualified for the 2019 BDO World Darts Championship by winning one of the 4 places on offer in the playoffs in Bridlington, The same week he qualified for Stage finals of the 2018 World Masters (darts) before losing in the last 32 to Welshman Jim Williams (darts player) 3–2 in a tense match.

== World Championship results ==
=== PDC ===
- 2011: First round (lost to Robert Thornton 1–3)
- 2012: First round (lost to Adrian Lewis 2–3)

=== BDO ===
- 2019: First round (lost to Richard Veenstra 2–3)

== Personal life ==
Heydon is a funeral director by trade, and uses "The Undertaker" as his nickname. Until mid-2010, he used the nickname "The Butcher", having previously been a butcher.

He is married to Philippa. The couple have five children – Janine, Melissa, twins Warren and Russell, and Shannon.
