= 2012 PDPA Players Championship 7 =

Second Round
1	(England) Justin Pipe	6
(Canada) Jeff Smith	4
(England) Adrian Lewis	6
(England) Dean Winstanley	1
16	(England) Terry Jenkins	4
(England) Stuart Kellett	6
17	(Scotland) Peter Wright	6
(England) Darren Webster	3
8	(Wales) Mark Webster	6
(England) Matthew Edgar	1
25	(England) Mark Walsh	6
(England) Nigel Heydon	3
9	(Netherlands) Michael van Gerwen	6
(England) Nick Fullwell	1
24	(Wales) Richie Burnett	6
(England) Sam Hill	3
5	(Netherlands) Raymond van Barneveld	6
(England) Mark Jones	5
28	(Northern Ireland) Brendan Dolan	6
(England) Tony Littleton	1
(England) Dennis Priestley	5
(Wales) Jamie Lewis	6
21	(England) Colin Lloyd	6
(England) Mark Frost	4
4	(Scotland) Gary Anderson	6
(England) Alex Roy	2
29	(Netherlands) Co Stompé	6
(England) Steve Farmer	1
13	(Canada) John Part	6
(Wales) Gareth Pass	3
20	(England) Jamie Caven	6
(England) Chris Aubrey	2
2	(England) Dave Chisnall	1
(England) Wayne Jones	6
(Scotland) Robert Thornton	6
(England) Roland Scholten	4
(England) Terry Temple	2
(England) Peter Hudson	6
18	(England) Mervyn King	6
(England) Scott Coleman	1
7	(England) Ronnie Baxter	6
(England) Dennis Smith	1
26	(England) Ian White	5
(England) Joe Cullen	6
10	(Australia) Paul Nicholson	4
(England) Andrew Gilding	6
(England) James Hubbard	6
(Netherlands) Jerry Hendriks	2
6	(Australia) Simon Whitlock	6
(Scotland) Jim Walker	0
27	(England) Andy Hamilton	6
(Scotland) Keith Stephen	2
(England) Ted Hankey	6
(England) Steve Hine	2
22	(Belgium) Kim Huybrechts	6
(England) Kevin Dowling	4
3	(England) Wes Newton	6
(Netherlands) Gino Vos	2
(England) Brian Woods	1
(England) Ross Smith	6
14	(England) Steve Beaton	6
(England) Kevin McDine	3
19	(England) Michael Smith	6
(England) Darren Johnson	0

Third Round
1	(England) Justin Pipe	5
(England) Adrian Lewis	6
(England) Stuart Kellett	6
17	(Scotland) Peter Wright	4
8	(Wales) Mark Webster	4
25	(England) Mark Walsh	6
9	(Netherlands) Michael van Gerwen	3
24	(Wales) Richie Burnett	6
5	(Netherlands) Raymond van Barneveld	6
28	(Northern Ireland) Brendan Dolan	5
(Wales) Jamie Lewis	4
21	(England) Colin Lloyd	6
4	(Scotland) Gary Anderson	6
29	(Netherlands) Co Stompé	2
13	(Canada) John Part	1
20	(England) Jamie Caven	6
(England) Wayne Jones	3
(Scotland) Robert Thornton	6
(England) Peter Hudson	6
18	(England) Mervyn King	3
7	(England) Ronnie Baxter	6
(England) Joe Cullen	3
(England) Andrew Gilding	5
(England) James Hubbard	6
6	(Australia) Simon Whitlock	6
27	(England) Andy Hamilton	1
(England) Ted Hankey	4
22	(Belgium) Kim Huybrechts	6
3	(England) Wes Newton	6
(England) Ross Smith	1
14	(England) Steve Beaton	3
19	(England) Michael Smith	6

Fourth Round
(England) Adrian Lewis	6
(England) Stuart Kellett	5
25	(England) Mark Walsh	6
24	(Wales) Richie Burnett	2
5	(Netherlands) Raymond van Barneveld	5
21	(England) Colin Lloyd	6
4	(Scotland) Gary Anderson	6
20	(England) Jamie Caven	4
(Scotland) Robert Thornton	3
(England) Peter Hudson	6
7	(England) Ronnie Baxter	6
(England) James Hubbard	3
6	(Australia) Simon Whitlock	6
22	(Belgium) Kim Huybrechts	4
3	(England) Wes Newton	6
19	(England) Michael Smith	3

Quarter-Finals
(England) Adrian Lewis	6
25	(England) Mark Walsh	4
21	(England) Colin Lloyd	6
4	(Scotland) Gary Anderson	1
(England) Peter Hudson	1
7	(England) Ronnie Baxter	6
6	(Australia) Simon Whitlock	5
3	(England) Wes Newton	6

Semi-Finals
(England) Adrian Lewis	6
21	(England) Colin Lloyd	3
7	(England) Ronnie Baxter	6
3	(England) Wes Newton	5

Final
(England) Adrian Lewis	3
7	(England) Ronnie Baxter	6
