= 2012 UK Open Qualifier 1 =

UK Open Qualifier 1

Tournament information
- Dates: Saturday 11 February
- Venue: K2 Centre
- Location: Crawley
- Country: England
- Organisation(s): PDC
- Format: Best of 11 legs
- Prize fund: £34,600
- Winner's share: £6,000

Champion(s)
- (England) Wes Newton

The 2012 UK Open Qualifier 1 was the first of eight 2012 UK Open Darts Qualifiers which was held at the K2 Centre in Crawley on Saturday 11 February.

== Prize money ==
| Stage | Prize money (Total-£34,600) |
|---|---|
| Winner | £6,000 |
| Runner Up | £3,000 |
| Semi Final | £2,000 |
| Quarter Final | £1,000 |
| Fourth Round | £600 |
| Third Round | £400 |
| Second Round | £200 |
| First Round | £0 |
| Preliminary Round | £0 |

== Draw ==
Second round
(England) | Darren Whittingham | 3
(Germany) | Bernd Roith | 6
(Australia) | Paul Nicholson | 6
(Spain) | Carlos Rodríguez | 3
(England) | Andrew Gilding | 0
(England) | Ronnie Baxter | 6
(Republic of Ireland) | Connie Finnan | 6
(England) | Ted Hankey | 4
(England) | Keegan Brown | 4
(England) | Andy Brown | 6
(England) | Matt Clark | 6
(England) | Matthew Edgar | 3
(Netherlands) | Jerry Hendriks | 1
(England) | Wes Newton | 6
(England) | Kevin Painter | 4
(Scotland) | Robert Thornton | 6
(England) | Kevin Dowling | 6
(England) | Andy Hibbert | 5
(England) | Michael Smith | 6
(England) | Stuart Kellett | 5
(England) | Danny Summers | 5
(Scotland) | Keith Stephen | 6
(England) | Ross Smith | 2
(Canada) | John Part | 6
(England) | Dean Winstanley | 6
(Gibraltar) | Dyson Parody | 5
(England) | Mark Jones | 5
(England) | James Wade | 6
(England) | James Hubbard | 4
(Republic of Ireland) | William O'Connor | 6
(England) | Andy Smith | 3
(England) | Terry Jenkins | 6
(England) | Wayne Jones | 6
(England) | Tony West | 4
(England) | Johnny Haines | 6
(Germany) | Jyhan Artut | 2
(England) | Mark Frost | 6
(England) | Martyn Turner | 2
(England) | Alex Roy | 4
(Australia) | Simon Whitlock | 6
(England) | Colin Lloyd | 3
(England) | Arron Monk | 6
(England) | Adam Smith-Neale | 6
(England) | Matt Jackson | 2
(Spain) | Antonio Alcinas | 4
(Scotland) | John Henderson | 6
(India) | Prakash Jiwa | 6
(England) | Michael Barnard | 5
(England) | Scott Rand | 6
(England) | Jim Walker | 3
(England) | Josh Jones | 1
(England) | Jamie Caven | 6
(England) | Peter Hudson | 6
(England) | Chris Mason | 2
(England) | Mark Walsh | 6
(England) | Steve Brown | 3
(England) | Joe Cullen | 6
(England) | Nigel Heydon | 3
(Netherlands) | Vincent van der Voort | 6
(England) | Mick Todd | 4
(England) | John Scott | 3
(England) | Mark Stephenson | 6
(Belgium) | Kim Huybrechts | 6
(England) | Mark Hylton | 3

Third round
(Germany) | Bernd Roith | 3
(Australia) | Paul Nicholson | 6
(England) | Ronnie Baxter | 6
(Republic of Ireland) | Connie Finnan | 2
(England) | Andy Brown | 6
(England) | Matt Clark | 4
(England) | Wes Newton | 6
(Scotland) | Robert Thornton | 3
(England) | Kevin Dowling | 6
(England) | Michael Smith | 3
(Scotland) | Keith Stephen | 4
(Canada) | John Part | 6
(England) | Dean Winstanley | 6
(England) | James Wade | 4
(Republic of Ireland) | William O'Connor | 6
(England) | Terry Jenkins | 3
(England) | Wayne Jones | 5
(England) | Johnny Haines | 6
(England) | Mark Frost | 2
(Australia) | Simon Whitlock | 6
(England) | Arron Monk | 6
(England) | Adam Smith-Neale | 5
(Scotland) | John Henderson | 1
(India) | Prakash Jiwa | 6
(England) | Scott Rand | 6
(England) | Jamie Caven | 5
(England) | Peter Hudson | 1
(England) | Mark Walsh | 6
(England) | Joe Cullen | 3
(Netherlands) | Vincent van der Voort | 6
(England) | Mark Stephenson | 0
(Belgium) | Kim Huybrechts | 6

Fourth round
(Australia) | Paul Nicholson | 2
(England) | Ronnie Baxter | 6
(England) | Andy Brown | 5
(England) | Wes Newton | 6
(England) | Kevin Dowling | 6
(Canada) | John Part | 5
(England) | Dean Winstanley | 5
(Republic of Ireland) | William O'Connor | 6
(England) | Johnny Haines | 4
(Australia) | Simon Whitlock | 6
(England) | Arron Monk | 3
(India) | Prakash Jiwa | 6
(England) | Scott Rand | 6
(England) | Mark Walsh | 5
(Netherlands) | Vincent van der Voort | 3
(Belgium) | Kim Huybrechts | 6

Quarter-finals
(England) | Ronnie Baxter | 4
(England) | Wes Newton | 6
(England) | Kevin Dowling | 6
(Republic of Ireland) | William O'Connor | 4
(Australia) | Simon Whitlock | 6
(India) | Prakash Jiwa | 2
(England) | Scott Rand | 4
(Belgium) | Kim Huybrechts | 6

Semi-finals
(England) | Wes Newton | 6
(England) | Kevin Dowling | 3
(Australia) | Simon Whitlock | 4
(Belgium) | Kim Huybrechts | 6

Final
(England) | Wes Newton | 6
(Belgium) | Kim Huybrechts | 3
