= 2012 PDPA Players Championship 6 =

Second Round
1	(England) Justin Pipe	6
(South Africa) Devon Petersen	2
(England) Arron Monk	6
(England) Steve Evans	2
16	(Netherlands) Vincent van der Voort	4
(Scotland) Robert Thornton	6
17	(England) Kevin Painter	6
(England) Sam Hill	1
8	(Australia) Simon Whitlock	6
(England) Shaun Griffiths	2
25	(England) Mark Walsh	4
(England) Scott Rand	6
9	(England) Andy Smith	6
(Spain) Antonio Alcinas	4
24	(England) Jamie Caven	6
(England) Scott Coleman	4
5	(Netherlands) Raymond van Barneveld	6
(England) Stephen Hardy	1
28	(England) Ian White	6
(Northern Ireland) Gino Vos	2
(England) Matt Clark	6
(Northern Ireland) Michael Mansell	2
21	(England) Michael Smith	3
(England) Kevin Dowling	6
4	(Scotland) Gary Anderson	3
(Netherlands) Jelle Klaasen	6
(England) Ted Hankey	6
(England) Steve Brown	1
13	(Netherlands) Michael van Gerwen	6
(England) Steve Hine	2
20	(England) Mervyn King	6
(England) Darren Johnson	1
2	(England) Dave Chisnall	6
(England) Terry Temple	4
31	(Netherlands) Co Stompé	6
(England) Alex Roy	2
15	(England) Colin Osborne	6
(England) Richie Howson	5
18	(Scotland) Peter Wright	6
(England) Darren Webster	1
7	(Australia) Paul Nicholson	5
(England) Stuart Kellett	6
26	(Belgium) Kim Huybrechts	6
(England) Peter Hudson	1
10	(Wales) Mark Webster	2
(England) John Bowles	6
23	(England) Colin Lloyd	6
(England) Chris Aubrey	4
6	(England) James Wade	5
(England) Keegan Brown	6
27	(England) Andy Hamilton	6
(Scotland) Jim Walker	2
11	(England) Ronnie Baxter	5
(Republic of Ireland) Paddy Meaney	6
(England) Joe Murnan	6
(England) Mark Frost	3
3	(England) Wes Newton	6
(England) Kevin McDine	5
30	(Northern Ireland) Brendan Dolan	6
(England) Jimmy Mann	0
(England) Tony West	6
(England) Tony Littleton	1
19	(England) Terry Jenkins	6
(England) Stuart White	2

Third Round
1	(England) Justin Pipe	6
(England) Arron Monk	3
(Scotland) Robert Thornton	4
17	(England) Kevin Painter	6
8	(Australia) Simon Whitlock	6
(England) Scott Rand	5
9	(England) Andy Smith	4
24	(England) Jamie Caven	6
5	(Netherlands) Raymond van Barneveld	6
28	(England) Ian White	4
(England) Matt Clark	5
(England) Kevin Dowling	6
(Netherlands) Jelle Klaasen	6
(England) Ted Hankey	2
13	(Netherlands) Michael van Gerwen	1
20	(England) Mervyn King	6
2	(England) Dave Chisnall	6
31	(Netherlands) Co Stompé	4
15	(England) Colin Osborne	4
18	(Scotland) Peter Wright	6
(England) Stuart Kellett	2
26	(Belgium) Kim Huybrechts	6
(England) John Bowles	6
23	(England) Colin Lloyd	5
(England) Keegan Brown	6
27	(England) Andy Hamilton	5
(Republic of Ireland) Paddy Meaney	2
(England) Joe Murnan	6
3	(England) Wes Newton	3
30	(Northern Ireland) Brendan Dolan	6
(England) Tony West	4
19	(England) Terry Jenkins	6

Fourth Round
1	(England) Justin Pipe	6
17	(England) Kevin Painter	4
8	(Australia) Simon Whitlock	6
24	(England) Jamie Caven	5
5	(Netherlands) Raymond van Barneveld	6
(England) Kevin Dowling	2
(Netherlands) Jelle Klaasen	0
20	(England) Mervyn King	6
2	(England) Dave Chisnall	6
18	(Scotland) Peter Wright	5
26	(Belgium) Kim Huybrechts	6
(England) John Bowles	5
(England) Keegan Brown	6
(England) Joe Murnan	1
30	(Northern Ireland) Brendan Dolan	2
19	(England) Terry Jenkins	6

Quarter-Finals
1	(England) Justin Pipe	6
8	(Australia) Simon Whitlock	3
5	(Netherlands) Raymond van Barneveld	6
20	(England) Mervyn King	2
2	(England) Dave Chisnall	6
26	(Belgium) Kim Huybrechts	4
(England) Keegan Brown	6
19	(England) Terry Jenkins	3

Semi-Finals
1	(England) Justin Pipe	6
5	(Netherlands) Raymond van Barneveld	4
2	(England) Dave Chisnall	6
(England) Keegan Brown	1

Final
1	(England) Justin Pipe	4
2	(England) Dave Chisnall	6
