= 2013 European Darts Trophy =

Tournament information
- Dates: 30 March–1 April 2013
- Venue: Glaspalast
- Location: Sindelfingen
- Country: Germany
- Organisation(s): PDC
- Format: Legs
- Prize fund: £100,000
- Winner's share: £20,000

Champion(s)
- (England) Wes Newton

The 2013 European Darts Trophy was the second of eight PDC European Tour events on the 2013 PDC Pro Tour. The tournament took place at the Glaspalast in Sindelfingen, Germany, from 30 March–1 April 2013. It featured a field of 64 players and £100,000 in prize money, with £20,000 going to the winner.

Wes Newton won his first European Tour title by defeating Paul Nicholson 6–5 in the final.

== Prize money ==
Stage (num. of players)		Prize money
Winner	(1)	£20,000
Runner-up	(1)	£10,000
Semi-finalists	(2)	£5,000
Quarter-finalists	(4)	£3,000
Third round losers	(8)	£2,000
Second round losers	(16)	£1,000
First round losers	(32)	£500
Total	£100,000	

== Qualification ==
The top 32 players from the PDC ProTour Order of Merit on the 5 March 2013 automatically qualified for the event. The remaining 32 places went to players from three qualifying events - 20 from the UK Qualifier (held in Wigan on 15 March), eight from the European Qualifier and four from the Host Nation Qualifier (both held at the venue in Sindelfingen on 29 March).

Phil Taylor, Adrian Lewis, Gary Anderson and Raymond van Barneveld opted to not play in the event. James Wade withdrew the day before the tournament started due to illness, as did Simon Whitlock in order to focus on the Premier League. An additional place in the draw was therefore available in the European Qualifier and the Host Nation Qualifier.

1–32

1. (England) Dave Chisnall (first round)
2. (Netherlands) Michael van Gerwen (semi-finals)
3. ~~(Australia) Simon Whitlock (withdrew)~~
4. (England) Justin Pipe (quarter-finals)
5. (England) Wes Newton (winner)
6. (England) Ian White (third round)
7. (Scotland) Robert Thornton (second round)
8. (Belgium) Kim Huybrechts (quarter-finals)
9. (England) Terry Jenkins (second round)
10. (England) Ronnie Baxter (third round)
11. (England) Andy Hamilton (second round)
12. (Scotland) Peter Wright (third round)
13. ~~(England) James Wade (withdrew)~~
14. (England) Colin Lloyd (second round)
15. (Northern Ireland) Brendan Dolan (second round)
16. (England) Mervyn King (second round)
17. (England) Andy Smith (third round)
18. (Wales) Richie Burnett (first round)
19. (Australia) Paul Nicholson (runner-up)
20. (England) Kevin Painter (second round)
21. (England) Colin Osborne (second round)
22. (Wales) Mark Webster (quarter-finals)
23. (England) Steve Beaton (first round)
24. (England) Mark Walsh (first round)
25. (England) Jamie Caven (second round)
26. (Netherlands) Vincent van der Voort (first round)
27. (England) James Hubbard (first round)
28. (England) Arron Monk (second round)
29. (England) Joe Cullen (second round)
30. (England) Dean Winstanley (third round)
31. (England) Darren Webster (second round)
32. (England) Scott Rand (first round)

UK Qualifier

- (England) Kevin Dowling (first round)
- (England) Michael Smith (second round)
- (England) John Bowles (first round)
- (England) Steve Hine (first round)
- (England) Ricky Sudale (first round)
- (England) Terry Temple (third round)
- (England) Ross Smith (second round)
- (England) Nick Fullwell (third round)
- (England) Alex Roy (first round)
- (England) Steve Maish (first round)
- (England) James Richardson (first round)
- (Wales) Gareth Pass (first round)
- (England) Jamie Robinson (third round)
- (Canada) John Part (quarter-finals)
- (England) Mark Hylton (first round)
- (Scotland) John Henderson (first round)
- (Republic of Ireland) Connie Finnan (second round)
- (England) Andrew Johnson (first round)
- (England) Gaz Cousins (first round)
- (England) Tony West (first round)

European Qualifier

- (Netherlands) Co Stompé (first round)
- (Netherlands) Leon de Geus (first round)
- (Netherlands) Leo Hendriks (first round)
- (Belgium) Ronny Huybrechts (first round)
- (Belgium) Kurt van de Rijck (first round)
- (Belgium) Davyd Venken (first round)
- (Austria) Mensur Suljović (semi-finals)
- (Sweden) Magnus Caris (first round)
- (Croatia) Dragutin Horvat (first round)

Host Nation Qualifier

- (Germany) Michael Kiebel (first round)
- (Germany) Tomas Seyler (first round)
- (Germany) Max Hopp (second round)
- (Germany) Mario Gaisbauer (first round)
- (Germany) Jyhan Artut (first round)

== Draw ==
First round (best of 11 legs); 30 March
1	(England) Dave Chisnall 94.91	1
(England) Michael Smith 103.13	6
32	(England) Scott Rand 85.91	5
(Austria) Mensur Suljović 88.63	6
16	(England) Mervyn King 89.29	6
(Netherlands) Leon de Geus 82.94	0
17	(England) Andy Smith 93.05	6
(Sweden) Magnus Caris 88.63	2
8	(Belgium) Kim Huybrechts 88.52	6
(England) Steve Hine 88.66	5
25	(England) Jamie Caven 84.63	6
(England) Andrew Johnson 77.45	3
9	(England) Terry Jenkins 85.58	6
(England) Tony West 85.02	5
24	(England) Mark Walsh 80.63	4
(England) Terry Temple 76.56	6
5	(England) Wes Newton 99.02	6
(Germany) Tomas Seyler 87.87	3
28	(England) Arron Monk 97.39	6
(England) Alex Roy 103.08	3
12	(Scotland) Peter Wright 94.37	6
(Germany) Michael Kiebel 74.56	2
21	(England) Colin Osborne 81.17	6
(England) Gaz Cousins 80.17	5
4	(England) Justin Pipe 87.28	6
(Netherlands) Co Stompé 72.28	1
29	(England) Joe Cullen 97.21	6
(England) Mark Hylton 88.71	5
Alt	(Germany) Jyhan Artut 85.74	2
(England) Nick Fullwell 88.31	6
20	(England) Kevin Painter 80.52	6
(Germany) Mario Gaisbauer 66.44	0
2	(Netherlands) Michael van Gerwen 82.75	6
(Netherlands) Leo Hendriks 72.05	1
31	(England) Darren Webster 88.95	6
(Belgium) Kurt van de Rijck 85.23	5
15	(Northern Ireland) Brendan Dolan 92.92	6
(England) John Bowles 91.43	4
18	(Wales) Richie Burnett 90.40	5
(England) Jamie Robinson 90.12	6
7	(Scotland) Robert Thornton 95.43	6
(England) Ricky Sudale 84.64	2
26	(Netherlands) Vincent van der Voort 94.42	1
(Canada) John Part 108.35	6
10	(England) Ronnie Baxter 99.51	6
(England) Kevin Dowling 89.53	3
23	(England) Steve Beaton 84.77	4
(Republic of Ireland) Connie Finnan 88.84	6
6	(England) Ian White 96.97	6
(England) James Richardson 79.43	0
27	(England) James Hubbard 78.96	1
(England) Ross Smith 93.40	6
11	(England) Andy Hamilton 85.79	6
(Wales) Gareth Pass 81.88	1
22	(Wales) Mark Webster 80.95	6
(England) Steve Maish 80.61	1
Alt	(Croatia) Dragutin Horvat 74.73	1
(Germany) Max Hopp 87.18	6
30	(England) Dean Winstanley 90.10	6
(Scotland) John Henderson 91.99	4
14	(England) Colin Lloyd 85.56	6
(Belgium) Davyd Venken 91.96	3
19	(Australia) Paul Nicholson 88.84	6
(Belgium) Ronny Huybrechts 88.16	5

Second round (best of 11 legs); 31 March
(England) M. Smith 87.30	4
(Austria) Suljović 75.05	6
16	(England) King 92.81	5
17	(England) A. Smith 93.13	6
8	(Belgium) K. Huybrechts 87.34	6
25	(England) Caven 87.41	5
9	(England) Jenkins 83.58	4
(England) Temple 93.52	6
5	(England) Newton 87.74	6
28	(England) Monk 84.05	5
12	(Scotland) Wright 88.17	6
21	(England) Osborne 86.67	1
4	(England) Pipe 92.46	6
29	(England) Cullen 85.36	1
(England) Fullwell 85.84	6
20	(England) Painter 77.63	4
2	(Netherlands) van Gerwen 87.55	6
31	(England) D. Webster 67.68	0
15	(Northern Ireland) Dolan 91.33	5
(England) Robinson 91.29	6
7	(Scotland) Thornton 90.55	4
(Canada) Part 88.83	6
10	(England) Baxter 89.42	6
(Republic of Ireland) Finnan 83.52	4
6	(England) White 98.14	6
(England) R. Smith 93.79	2
11	(England) Hamilton 87.17	3
22	(Wales) M. Webster 88.27	6
(Germany) Hopp 85.62	3
30	(England) Winstanley 87.02	6
14	(England) Lloyd 87.55	5
19	(Australia) Nicholson 94.09	6

Third round (best of 11 legs); 1 April
(Austria) Suljović 99.10	6
17	(England) A. Smith 89.31	0
8	(Belgium) K. Huybrechts 102.58	6
(England) Temple 90.40	3
5	(England) Newton 100.04	6
12	(Scotland) Wright 87.06	4
4	(England) Pipe 86.11	6
(England) Fullwell 88.54	3
2	(Netherlands) van Gerwen 101.97	6
(England) Robinson 85.82	1
(Canada) Part 84.97	6
10	(England) Baxter 86.59	2
6	(England) White 95.59	5
22	(Wales) M. Webster 91.62	6
30	(England) Winstanley 94.30	4
19	(Australia) Nicholson 89.98	6

Quarter-finals (best of 11 legs); 1 April
(Austria) Suljović 96.00	6
8	(Belgium) K. Huybrechts 97.82	4
5	(England) Newton 86.60	6
4	(England) Pipe 81.02	4
2	(Netherlands) van Gerwen 97.34	6
(Canada) Part 78.00	1
22	(Wales) M. Webster 91.66	4
19	(Australia) Nicholson 91.94	6

Semi-finals (best of 11 legs); 1 April
(Austria) Suljović 98.68	4
5	(England) Newton 100.37	6
2	(Netherlands) van Gerwen 93.47	2
19	(Australia) Nicholson 92.58	6

Final (best of 11 legs); 1 April
5	(England) Newton 92.95	6
19	(Australia) Nicholson 91.45	5
