= 2012 Dutch Darts Masters =

Tournament information
- Dates: 26–28 October 2012
- Venue: Van Der Valk Hotel
- Location: Nuland
- Country: Netherlands
- Organisation(s): PDC
- Format: Legs
- Prize fund: £82,100
- Winner's share: £15,000

Champion(s)
- (Australia) Simon Whitlock

The 2012 Dutch Darts Masters was the fifth of five PDC European Tour events on the 2012 PDC Pro Tour. The tournament took place at the Van Der Valk Hotel in Nuland, Netherlands, from 26 to 28 October 2012. It featured a field of 64 players and £82,100 in prize money, with £15,000 going to the winner.

Simon Whitlock won his first European Tour title, defeating Paul Nicholson 6–1 in the final.

== Prize money ==
Stage (num. of players)		Prize money
Winner	(1)	£15,000
Runner-up	(1)	£7,500
Semi-finalists	(2)	£5,000
Quarter-finalists	(4)	£3,000
Third round losers	(8)	£1,500
Second round losers	(16)	£1,000
First round losers	(32)	£200
Final qualifying round losers	(32)	£100
Total	£82,100	

== Qualification ==
The top 32 players from the PDC Order of Merit automatically qualified for the event. The remaining 32 places went to players from three qualifying events - 20 from the UK Qualifier (held in Dublin on 5 October), eight from the European Qualifier and four from the Host Nation Qualifier.

Robert Thornton withdrew the day before the start of the tournament due to ill health.

1–32

1. (England) Phil Taylor (quarter-finals)
2. (Australia) Simon Whitlock (winner)
3. (England) Wes Newton (second round)
4. (England) Andy Hamilton (third round)
5. (England) Terry Jenkins (first round)
6. (Wales) Mark Webster (first round)
7. (Netherlands) Raymond van Barneveld (second round)
8. (England) Justin Pipe (first round)
9. (England) Kevin Painter (second round)
10. (England) Dave Chisnall (first round)
11. (England) Ronnie Baxter (second round)
12. (Australia) Paul Nicholson (runner-up)
13. (Netherlands) Vincent van der Voort (second round)
14. (England) Mark Walsh (quarter-finals)
15. (England) Mervyn King (second round)
16. (England) Andy Smith (third round)
17. (England) Colin Lloyd (first round)
18. ~~(Scotland) Robert Thornton (withdrew)~~
19. (Northern Ireland) Brendan Dolan (second round)
20. (Canada) John Part (first round)
21. (Netherlands) Michael van Gerwen (second round)
22. (England) Colin Osborne (third round)
23. (England) Jamie Caven (third round)
24. (England) Wayne Jones (semi-finals)
25. (England) Denis Ovens (first round)
26. (Scotland) Peter Wright (first round)
27. (Belgium) Kim Huybrechts (semi-finals)
28. (England) Steve Beaton (second round)
29. (England) Mark Hylton (first round)
30. (England) Steve Brown (third round)
31. (England) Alan Tabern (second round)
32. (Netherlands) Co Stompé (second round)

UK Qualifier

- (England) Johnny Haines (quarter-finals)
- (England) Steve Hine (first round)
- (England) James Hubbard (second round)
- (England) Peter Hudson (first round)
- (England) Andy Jenkins (third round)
- (England) Mark Jones (second round)
- (England) Arron Monk (quarter-finals)
- (England) Dennis Priestley (first round)
- (England) Scott Rand (second round)
- (England) Dennis Smith (first round)
- (England) Michael Smith (first round)
- (England) Ross Smith (first round)
- (England) Terry Temple (first round)
- (England) Mick Todd (first round)
- (England) Tony West (first round)
- (England) Ian White (third round)
- (England) Dean Winstanley (first round)
- (England) Brian Woods (first round)
- (England) Dave Ladley (first round)
- (Scotland) Jim Walker (first round)

European Qualifier

- (Germany) Max Hopp (third round)
- (Belgium) Ronny Huybrechts (first round)
- (Denmark) Per Laursen (first round)
- (Germany) Kevin Münch (first round)
- (Germany) Bernd Roith (first round)
- (Germany) Tomas Seyler (first round)
- (Belgium) Davyd Venken (second round)
- (Germany) Jyhan Artut (first round)

Host Nation Qualifier

- (Netherlands) Toon Greebe (first round)
- (Netherlands) Roland Scholten (first round)
- (Netherlands) Dick van Dijk (first round)
- (Netherlands) Gino Vos (second round)

== Draw ==
First round (best of 11 legs); 26 October
1	(England) Phil Taylor	6
(England) Steve Hine	0
32	(Netherlands) Co Stompé	6
(England) Terry Temple	2
16	(England) Andy Smith	6
(England) Dennis Priestley	3
17	(England) Colin Lloyd	3
(England) Scott Rand	6
8	(England) Justin Pipe	2
(England) Andy Jenkins	6
25	(England) Denis Ovens	2
(England) James Hubbard	6
9	(England) Kevin Painter	6
(England) Brian Woods	3
24	(England) Wayne Jones	6
(England) Dave Ladley	2
5	(England) Terry Jenkins	5
(Germany) Max Hopp	6
28	(England) Steve Beaton	6
(England) Dean Winstanley	5
12	(Australia) Paul Nicholson	6
(England) Ross Smith	3
21	(Netherlands) Michael van Gerwen	6
(England) Peter Hudson	4
4	(England) Andy Hamilton	6
(England) Dennis Smith	5
29	(England) Mark Hylton	4
(Belgium) Davyd Venken	6
13	(Netherlands) Vincent van der Voort	6
(Germany) Bernd Roith	0
20	(Canada) John Part	4
(England) Arron Monk	6
2	(Australia) Simon Whitlock	6
(Denmark) Per Laursen	4
31	(England) Alan Tabern	6
(England) Michael Smith	4
15	(England) Mervyn King	6
(Belgium) Ronny Huybrechts	1
18	(Scotland) Robert Thornton	w/d
(England) Ian White	w/o
7	(Netherlands) Raymond van Barneveld	6
(England) Mick Todd	3
26	(Scotland) Peter Wright	5
(England) Johnny Haines	6
10	(England) Dave Chisnall	1
(Netherlands) Gino Vos	6
23	(England) Jamie Caven	6
(Germany) Kevin Münch	1
6	(Wales) Mark Webster	0
(England) Mark Jones	6
27	(Belgium) Kim Huybrechts	6
(Germany) Tomas Seyler	2
11	(England) Ronnie Baxter	6
(Netherlands) Roland Scholten	4
22	(England) Colin Osborne	6
(Netherlands) Toon Greebe	3
3	(England) Wes Newton	6
(Germany) Jyhan Artut	4
30	(England) Steve Brown	6
(Netherlands) Dick van Dijk	5
14	(England) Mark Walsh	6
(Scotland) Jim Walker	1
19	(Northern Ireland) Brendan Dolan	6
(England) Tony West	5

Second round (best of 11 legs); 27 October
1	(England) Taylor	6
32	(Netherlands) Stompé	3
16	(England) A. Smith 93.94	6
(England) Rand 91.52	0
(England) A. Jenkins 88.13	6
(England) Hubbard 89.30	4
9	(England) Painter 88.93	5
24	(England) W. Jones 90.64	6
(Germany) Hopp	6
28	(England) Beaton	4
12	(Australia) Nicholson	6
21	(Netherlands) van Gerwen	4
4	(England) Hamilton 96.25	6
(Belgium) Venken 91.16	4
13	(Netherlands) van der Voort	5
(England) Monk	6
2	(Australia) Whitlock	6
31	(England) Tabern	2
15	(England) King	4
(England) White	6
7	(Netherlands) van Barneveld	5
(England) Haines	6
(Netherlands) Vos 77.54	1
23	(England) Caven 84.18	6
(England) M. Jones	2
27	(Belgium) K. Huybrechts	6
11	(England) Baxter 88.36	4
22	(England) Osborne 97.53	6
3	(England) Newton	2
30	(England) Brown	6
14	(England) Walsh	6
19	(Northern Ireland) Dolan	3

Third round (best of 11 legs); 28 October
1	(England) Taylor 109.76	6
16	(England) A. Smith 96.55	1
(England) A. Jenkins 80.67	1
24	(England) W. Jones 89.10	6
(Germany) Hopp 89.57	1
12	(Australia) Nicholson 91.12	6
4	(England) Hamilton 89.59	4
(England) Monk 88.99	6
2	(Australia) Whitlock 102.50	6
(England) White 91.93	1
(England) Haines 88.40	6
23	(England) Caven 93.91	5
27	(Belgium) K. Huybrechts 92.37	6
22	(England) Osborne 88.70	4
30	(England) Brown 96.36	3
14	(England) Walsh 101.86	6

Quarter-finals (best of 11 legs); 28 October
1	(England) Taylor 99.63	5
24	(England) W. Jones 101.49	6
12	(Australia) Nicholson 83.31	6
(England) Monk 69.39	1
2	(Australia) Whitlock 97.33	6
(England) Haines 87.42	2
27	(Belgium) K. Huybrechts 99.91	6
14	(England) Walsh 96.21	2

Semi-finals (best of 11 legs); 28 October
24	(England) W. Jones 98.95	3
12	(Australia) Nicholson 101.02	6
2	(Australia) Whitlock 99.71	6
27	(Belgium) K. Huybrechts 87.86	1

Final (best of 11 legs); 28 October
12	(Australia) Nicholson 74.49	1
2	(Australia) Whitlock 87.50	6
