= 2012 UK Open Qualifier 8 =

UK Open Qualifier 8

Tournament information
- Dates: Sunday 6 May
- Venue: NIA Community Hall
- Location: Birmingham
- Country: England
- Organisation(s): PDC
- Format: Best of 11 legs
- Prize fund: £34,600
- Winner's share: £6,000

Champion(s)
- (England) Wes Newton

The 2012 UK Open Qualifier 8 was the last of eight 2012 UK Open Darts Qualifiers which was held at the NIA Community Hall in Birmingham on Sunday 6 May.

== Prize money ==
Stage	Prize money (Total-£34,600)
Winner	£6,000
Runner Up	£3,000
Semi Final	£2,000
Quarter Final	£1,000
Fourth Round	£600
Third Round	£400
Second Round	£200
First Round	£0
Preliminary Round	£0

== Draw ==
Second round
(England)	Brian Woods	6
(England)	Stuart White	1
(England)	Richie Howson	6
(Australia)	Paul Nicholson	5
(England)	Mark Stephenson	0
(England)	Mark Hylton	6
(England)	Peter Hudson	6
(England)	Alan Tabern	4
(England)	Joe Cullen	6
(England)	Mark Lawrence	4
(Netherlands)	Mareno Michels	2
(England)	Shaun Griffiths	6
(England)	Ronnie Baxter	3
(Netherlands)	Vincent van der Voort	6
(Netherlands)	Michael van Gerwen	6
(Northern Ireland)	Brendan Dolan	2
(Scotland)	Jim Walker	6
(England)	Nigel Heydon	5
(England)	Steve Brown	4
(England)	Colin Osborne	6
(England)	Jon Bott	6
(England)	Daniel Starkey	2
(England)	Justin Pipe	6
(England)	Scott Rand	4
(Netherlands)	Toon Greebe	2
(England)	James Hubbard	6
(England)	Michael Smith	4
(England)	Darren Webster	6
(England)	Adam Smith-Neale	0
(England)	Andy Brown	6
(England)	Denis Ovens	5
(England)	Dennis Smith	6
(Scotland)	Robert Thornton	6
(England)	Dave Ladley	0
(England)	Kevin Painter	3
(England)	Andrew Gilding	6
(England)	Wayne Jones	2
(Australia)	Simon Whitlock	6
(England)	Ryan Harrington	0
(Wales)	Mark Webster	6
(England)	Andrew Cornwall	6
(England)	Nick Fullwell
(England)	Damien Sherwood	4
(England)	Sam Hill	6
(England)	Wes Newton	6
(England)	Tom Jones	1
(England)	Gary Butcher	6
(Netherlands)	Jerry Hendriks	5
(Germany)	Michael Rosenauer	1
(England)	Andy Jenkins	6
(Netherlands)	Jelle Klaasen	6
(England)	Andy Hamilton	5
(England)	Dean Winstanley	6
(England)	Andrew Palmer	3
(Netherlands)	Roland Scholten	1
(Scotland)	Peter Wright	6
(Germany)	Bernd Roith	2
(Belgium)	Kim Huybrechts	6
(Spain)	Antonio Alcinas	1
(England)	Alex Roy	6
(England)	Andy Smith	6
(Northern Ireland)	Michael Mansell	4
(England)	Adrian Lewis	5
(England)	Stuart Kellett	6

Third round
(England)	Brian Woods	4
(England)	Richie Howson	6
(England)	Mark Hylton	6
(England)	Peter Hudson	0
(England)	Joe Cullen	6
(England)	Shaun Griffiths	3
(Netherlands)	Vincent van der Voort	6
(Netherlands)	Michael van Gerwen	1
(Scotland)	Jim Walker	3
(England)	Colin Osborne	6
(England)	Jon Bott	3
(England)	Justin Pipe	6
(England)	James Hubbard	6
(England)	Darren Webster	4
(England)	Andy Brown	4
(England)	Dennis Smith	6
(Scotland)	Robert Thornton	6
(England)	Andrew Gilding	2
(Australia)	Simon Whitlock	6
(Wales)	Mark Webster	0
(England)	Andrew Cornwall	6
(England)	Sam Hill	3
(England)	Wes Newton	6
(England)	Gary Butcher	3
(England)	Andy Jenkins	6
(Netherlands)	Jelle Klaasen	5
(England)	Dean Winstanley	4
(Scotland)	Peter Wright	6
(Belgium)	Kim Huybrechts	5
(England)	Alex Roy	6
(England)	Andy Smith	6
(England)	Stuart Kellett	0

Fourth round
(England)	Richie Howson	4
(England)	Mark Hylton	6
(England)	Joe Cullen	6
(Netherlands)	Vincent van der Voort	1
(England)	Colin Osborne	4
(England)	Justin Pipe	6
(England)	James Hubbard	6
(England)	Dennis Smith	5
(Scotland)	Robert Thornton	6
(Australia)	Simon Whitlock	2
(England)	Andrew Cornwall	1
(England)	Wes Newton	6
(England)	Andy Jenkins	1
(Scotland)	Peter Wright	6
(England)	Alex Roy	0
(England)	Andy Smith	6

Quarter-finals
(England)	Mark Hylton	4
(England)	Joe Cullen	6
(England)	Justin Pipe	6
(England)	James Hubbard	3
(Scotland)	Robert Thornton	3
(England)	Wes Newton	6
(Scotland)	Peter Wright	4
(England)	Andy Smith	6

Semi-finals
(England)	Joe Cullen	0
(England)	Justin Pipe	6
(England)	Wes Newton	6
(England)	Andy Smith	3

Final
(England)	Justin Pipe	2
(England)	Wes Newton	6
