= 2012 Grand Slam of Darts =

2012 William Hill Grand Slam of Darts

Tournament information
- Dates: 10–18 November 2012
- Venue: Wolverhampton Civic Hall
- Location: Wolverhampton
- Country: England
- Organisation(s): PDC
- Format: Legs
- Prize fund: £400,000
- Winner's share: £100,000
- High checkout: 170 (Netherlands) Michael van Gerwen (4x) (Netherlands) Wesley Harms

Champion(s)
- (Netherlands) Raymond van Barneveld

The 2012 William Hill Grand Slam of Darts, was the sixth staging of the tournament, organised by the Professional Darts Corporation. The event took place from 10–18 November 2012 at the Wolverhampton Civic Hall, Wolverhampton, England.

Phil Taylor was the defending champion, but was beaten in the Last 16 by Michael van Gerwen, who went on to make the final, but lost 16–14 to Raymond van Barneveld.

== Prize money ==
Position (num. of players)		Prize money (Total: £400,000)
Winner	(1)	£100,000
Runner-up	(1)	£50,000
Semi-finalists	(2)	£25,000
Quarter-finalists	(4)	£15,000
Last 16 (second round)	(8)	£7,500
Third in group	(8)	£5,000
Fourth in group	(8)	£2,500
Group winner bonus	(8)	£2,500

== Qualifying ==
=== Qualifying tournaments ===
==== PDC ====
Tournament	Year	Position	Player	Qualifiers
Grand Slam of Darts	2011	Winner	(England) Phil Taylor	(England) Phil Taylor (Scotland) Gary Anderson (England) Adrian Lewis (England) Mark Walsh (England) Scott Waites (England) James Wade (England) Steve Beaton (England) Wayne Jones (England) Andy Hamilton (Australia) Simon Whitlock (Wales) Mark Webster (England) Terry Jenkins (Canada) John Part (Netherlands) Michael van Gerwen (England) Mervyn King (Northern Ireland) Brendan Dolan (Scotland) Robert Thornton (England) Wes Newton (Australia) Paul Nicholson (England) Kevin Painter (Netherlands) Raymond van Barneveld (Netherlands) Co Stompé (Wales) Barrie Bates (England) James Hubbard
Grand Slam of Darts	2011	Runner-Up	(Scotland) Gary Anderson	
Grand Slam of Darts	2011	Semi-finalists	(England) Adrian Lewis (England) Mark Walsh	
Grand Slam of Darts	2010	Winner	(England) Scott Waites	
Grand Slam of Darts	2010	Runner-Up	(England) James Wade	
Grand Slam of Darts	2010	Semi-finalists	(England) Steve Beaton (England) Wayne Jones	
PDC World Darts Championship	2012	Winner	(England) Adrian Lewis	
PDC World Darts Championship	2012	Runner-Up	(England) Andy Hamilton	
PDC World Darts Championship	2012	Semi-finalists	(Australia) Simon Whitlock (England) James Wade	
PDC World Darts Championship	2011	Winner	(England) Adrian Lewis	
PDC World Darts Championship	2011	Runner-Up	(Scotland) Gary Anderson	
PDC World Darts Championship	2011	Semi-finalists	(Wales) Mark Webster (England) Terry Jenkins	
PDC World Darts Championship	2010	Winner	(England) Phil Taylor	
PDC World Darts Championship	2009	Winner	(England) Phil Taylor	
PDC World Darts Championship	2008	Winner	(Canada) John Part	
World Matchplay	2012	Winner	(England) Phil Taylor	
World Matchplay	2012	Runner-Up	(England) James Wade	
World Matchplay	2011	Winner	(England) Phil Taylor	
World Matchplay	2011	Runner-Up	(England) James Wade	
World Grand Prix	2012	Winner	(Netherlands) Michael van Gerwen	
World Grand Prix	2012	Runner-Up	(England) Mervyn King	
World Grand Prix	2011	Winner	(England) Phil Taylor	
World Grand Prix	2011	Runner-Up	(Northern Ireland) Brendan Dolan	
UK Open	2012	Winner	(Scotland) Robert Thornton	
UK Open	2012	Runner-Up	(England) Phil Taylor	
UK Open	2011	Winner	(England) James Wade	
UK Open	2011	Runner-Up	(England) Wes Newton	
Premier League Darts	2012	Winner	(England) Phil Taylor	
Premier League Darts	2012	Runner-Up	(Australia) Simon Whitlock	
Premier League Darts	2011	Winner	(Scotland) Gary Anderson	
Premier League Darts	2011	Runner-Up	(England) Adrian Lewis	
Championship League Darts	2012	Winner	(England) Phil Taylor	
Championship League Darts	2012	Runner-Up	(Australia) Simon Whitlock	
Championship League Darts	2011	Winner	(England) Phil Taylor	
Championship League Darts	2011	Runner-Up	(Australia) Paul Nicholson	
Players Championship Finals	2011 (2)	Winner	(England) Kevin Painter	
Players Championship Finals	2011 (2)	Runner-Up	(Wales) Mark Webster	
Players Championship Finals	2011 (1)	Winner	(England) Phil Taylor	
Players Championship Finals	2011 (1)	Runner-Up	(Scotland) Gary Anderson	
European Championship	2012	Winner	(Australia) Simon Whitlock	
European Championship	2012	Runner-Up	(England) Wes Newton	
European Championship	2011	Winner	(England) Phil Taylor	
European Championship	2011	Runner-Up	(England) Adrian Lewis	
PDC World Cup of Darts	2012	Winners	(England) Phil Taylor (England) Adrian Lewis	
PDC World Cup of Darts	2012	Runners-Up	(Australia) Simon Whitlock (Australia) Paul Nicholson	
PDC World Cup of Darts	2010	Winners	(Netherlands) Raymond van Barneveld (Netherlands) Co Stompé	
PDC World Cup of Darts	2010	Runners-Up	(Wales) Mark Webster (Wales) Barrie Bates	
PDC World Youth Championship	2012	Winner	(England) James Hubbard	
PDC World Youth Championship	2012	Runner-Up	(Netherlands) Michael van Gerwen	
Note: Players in italics had already qualified for the tournament.

==== BDO ====
Tournament	Year	Position	Player	Qualifiers
BDO World Darts Championship	2012	Winner	(Netherlands) Christian Kist	(Netherlands) Christian Kist (England) Tony O'Shea (Netherlands) Wesley Harms (England) Ted Hankey (England) Dean Winstanley (Wales) Martin Phillips (Netherlands) Jan Dekker
BDO World Darts Championship	2012	Runner-Up	(England) Tony O'Shea	(Netherlands) Christian Kist (England) Tony O'Shea (Netherlands) Wesley Harms (England) Ted Hankey (England) Dean Winstanley (Wales) Martin Phillips (Netherlands) Jan Dekker
BDO World Darts Championship	2012	Semi-finalists	(Netherlands) Wesley Harms (England) Ted Hankey	(Netherlands) Christian Kist (England) Tony O'Shea (Netherlands) Wesley Harms (England) Ted Hankey (England) Dean Winstanley (Wales) Martin Phillips (Netherlands) Jan Dekker
BDO World Darts Championship	2011	Winner	(England) ~~Martin Adams~~	(Netherlands) Christian Kist (England) Tony O'Shea (Netherlands) Wesley Harms (England) Ted Hankey (England) Dean Winstanley (Wales) Martin Phillips (Netherlands) Jan Dekker
BDO World Darts Championship	2011	Runner-Up	(England) Dean Winstanley	(Netherlands) Christian Kist (England) Tony O'Shea (Netherlands) Wesley Harms (England) Ted Hankey (England) Dean Winstanley (Wales) Martin Phillips (Netherlands) Jan Dekker
BDO World Darts Championship	2011	Semi-finalists	(Wales) Martin Phillips (Netherlands) Jan Dekker	(Netherlands) Christian Kist (England) Tony O'Shea (Netherlands) Wesley Harms (England) Ted Hankey (England) Dean Winstanley (Wales) Martin Phillips (Netherlands) Jan Dekker
BDO World Darts Championship	2010	Winner	(England) ~~Martin Adams~~	(Netherlands) Christian Kist (England) Tony O'Shea (Netherlands) Wesley Harms (England) Ted Hankey (England) Dean Winstanley (Wales) Martin Phillips (Netherlands) Jan Dekker
BDO World Darts Championship	2009	Winner	(England) Ted Hankey	(Netherlands) Christian Kist (England) Tony O'Shea (Netherlands) Wesley Harms (England) Ted Hankey (England) Dean Winstanley (Wales) Martin Phillips (Netherlands) Jan Dekker
BDO World Darts Championship	2008	Winner	(Wales) Mark Webster	(Netherlands) Christian Kist (England) Tony O'Shea (Netherlands) Wesley Harms (England) Ted Hankey (England) Dean Winstanley (Wales) Martin Phillips (Netherlands) Jan Dekker
Note: Players in italics had already qualified for the tournament.				(Netherlands) Christian Kist (England) Tony O'Shea (Netherlands) Wesley Harms (England) Ted Hankey (England) Dean Winstanley (Wales) Martin Phillips (Netherlands) Jan Dekker

==== Other qualifiers ====
Criteria	Player
PDC Unicorn Youth Tour Order of Merit Leader	(England) Arron Monk

== Pools ==
Pool A	Pool B	Pool C	Pool D
(Seeded Players)	(qualifiers)		
(England) Phil Taylor (1) (England) Adrian Lewis (2) (Netherlands) Christian Kist (3) (England) James Wade (4) (Australia) Simon Whitlock (5) (England) Wes Newton (6) (England) Andy Hamilton (7) (Netherlands) Michael van Gerwen (8)	(Scotland) Gary Anderson (Netherlands) Jan Dekker (England) Terry Jenkins (Australia) Paul Nicholson (England) Kevin Painter (Scotland) Robert Thornton (Netherlands) Raymond van Barneveld (England) Scott Waites	(Northern Ireland) Brendan Dolan (England) Ted Hankey (Netherlands) Wesley Harms (England) Mervyn King (Canada) John Part (England) Mark Walsh (Wales) Mark Webster (England) Dean Winstanley	(Wales) Barrie Bates (England) Steve Beaton (England) James Hubbard (England) Wayne Jones (England) Arron Monk (England) Tony O'Shea (Wales) Martin Phillips (Netherlands) Co Stompé

== Draw ==
=== Group stage ===
All matches first-to-5/best of 9

NB in Brackets: Number = Seeds; BDO = BDO Darts player; RQ = Ranking Qualifier NB: P = Played; W = Won; L = Lost; LF = Legs for; LA = Legs against; +/- = Plus/minus record, in relation to legs; Average – 3-dart average; Pts = Points; Q = Qualified for K.O. phase

==== Group A ====
Pos.	Player	P	W	L	LF	LA	+/-	Pts	Status
1	Scott Waites (BDO)	3	2	1	13	8	+5	4	Q
2	(England) Phil Taylor (1)	3	2	1	12	8	+4	4	Q
3	Mark Webster	3	1	2	9	13	−4	2	Eliminated
4	(Netherlands) Co Stompé	3	1	2	7	12	−5	2	Eliminated

10 November

92.35 Scott Waites (England)	3 – 5	(Wales) Mark Webster 94.32
100.38 Phil Taylor (England)	5 – 1	(Netherlands) Co Stompé 88.18

11 November

103.79 Scott Waites (England)	5 – 1	(Netherlands) Co Stompé 97.54
94.81 Phil Taylor (England)	5 – 2	(Wales) Mark Webster 92.30

13 November

83.78 Mark Webster (Wales)	2 – 5	(Netherlands) Co Stompé 87.29
95.63 Phil Taylor (England)	2 – 5	(England) Scott Waites 102.77

==== Group B ====
Pos.	Player	P	W	L	LF	LA	+/-	Pts	Status
1	(Netherlands) Michael van Gerwen (8)	3	3	0	15	5	+10	6	Q
2	(Scotland) Robert Thornton	3	2	1	13	9	+4	4	Q
3	(England) Ted Hankey	3	1	2	5	13	−8	2	Eliminated
4	(England) Steve Beaton	3	0	3	9	15	−6	0	Eliminated

10 November

84.44 Robert Thornton (Scotland)	5 – 0	(England) Ted Hankey 84.57
103.42 Michael van Gerwen (Netherlands)	5 – 2	(England) Steve Beaton 92.71

11 November

91.28 Steve Beaton (England)	3 – 5	(England) Ted Hankey 90.82
91.49 Michael van Gerwen (Netherlands)	5 – 3	(Scotland) Robert Thornton 91.91

13 November

93.44 Robert Thornton (Scotland)	5 – 4	(England) Steve Beaton 97.60
90.54 Michael van Gerwen (Netherlands)	5 – 0	(England) Ted Hankey 59.67

==== Group C ====
Pos.	Player	P	W	L	LF	LA	+/-	Pts	Status
1	Dean Winstanley	3	2	1	14	8	+6	4	Q
2	Kevin Painter	3	2	1	14	12	+2	4	Q
3	Simon Whitlock (5)	3	2	1	11	11	0	4	Eliminated
4	James Hubbard	3	0	3	7	15	−8	0	Eliminated

10 November

88.18 Kevin Painter (England)	5 – 4	(England) Dean Winstanley 89.77
96.50 Simon Whitlock (Australia)	5 – 2	(England) James Hubbard 91.42

11 November

89.45 Dean Winstanley (England)	5 – 2	(England) James Hubbard 91.36
85.98 Simon Whitlock (Australia)	5 – 4	(England) Kevin Painter 88.32

13 November

92.50 Kevin Painter (England)	5 – 3	(England) James Hubbard 81.65
92.96 Simon Whitlock (Australia)	1 – 5	(England) Dean Winstanley 100.63

==== Group D ====
Pos.	Player	P	W	L	LF	LA	+/-	Pts	Status
1	Mervyn King	3	3	0	15	6	+9	6	Q
2	Arron Monk (RQ)	3	2	1	13	7	+6	4	Q
3	James Wade (4)	3	1	2	8	11	−3	2	Eliminated
4	Jan Dekker (BDO)	3	0	3	3	15	−12	0	Eliminated

10 November

73.45 Jan Dekker (Netherlands)	1 – 5	(England) Mervyn King 91.78
82.06 James Wade (England)	1 – 5	(England) Arron Monk 79.49

11 November

99.41 James Wade (England)	5 – 1	(Netherlands) Jan Dekker 84.67
99.53 Mervyn King (England)	5 – 3	(England) Arron Monk 88.20

13 November

71.17 Jan Dekker (Netherlands)	1 – 5	(England) Arron Monk 83.85
92.71 James Wade (England)	2 – 5	(England) Mervyn King 97.78

==== Group E ====
Pos.	Player	P	W	L	LF	LA	+/-	Pts	Status
1	(Canada) John Part	3	2	1	14	11	+3	4	Q
2	(Scotland) Gary Anderson	3	2	1	14	13	+1	4	Q
3	(England) Tony O'Shea (BDO)	3	1	2	13	14	−1	2	Eliminated
4	(England) Adrian Lewis (2)	3	1	2	11	14	−3	2	Eliminated

11 November

88.41 Adrian Lewis (England)	4 – 5	(England) Tony O'Shea 90.71
95.22 Gary Anderson (Scotland)	5 – 4	(Canada) John Part 85.50

12 November

78.35 Adrian Lewis (England)	2 – 5	(Canada) John Part 78.66
96.58 Gary Anderson (Scotland)	5 – 4	(England) Tony O'Shea 89.96

14 November

95.26 Adrian Lewis (England)	5 – 4	(Scotland) Gary Anderson 94.05
80.19 John Part (Canada)	5 − 4	(England) Tony O'Shea 84.95

==== Group F ====
Pos.	Player	P	W	L	LF	LA	+/-	Pts	Status
1	(England) Andy Hamilton (7)	3	3	0	15	7	+8	6	Q
2	(Northern Ireland) Brendan Dolan	3	2	1	11	7	+4	4	Q
3	(Australia) Paul Nicholson	3	1	2	11	10	+1	2	Eliminated
4	(Wales) Barrie Bates	3	0	3	2	15	−13	0	Eliminated

11 November

85.95 Paul Nicholson (Australia)	2 – 5	(Northern Ireland) Brendan Dolan 88.20
87.92 Andy Hamilton (England)	5 – 2	(Wales) Barrie Bates 78.19

12 November

91.65 Paul Nicholson (Australia)	5 – 0	(Wales) Barrie Bates 73.54
89.63 Andy Hamilton (England)	5 – 1	(Northern Ireland) Brendan Dolan 85.85

14 November

91.65 Brendan Dolan (Northern Ireland)	5 – 0	(Wales) Barrie Bates 74.19
97.31 Andy Hamilton (England)	5 – 4	(Australia) Paul Nicholson 94.65

==== Group G ====
Pos.	Player	P	W	L	LF	LA	+/-	Pts	Status
1	(England) Wes Newton (6)	3	3	0	15	6	+9	6	Q
2	(Netherlands) Wesley Harms (BDO)	3	2	1	12	9	+3	4	Q
3	(England) Terry Jenkins	3	1	2	9	12	−3	2	Eliminated
4	(Wales) Martin Phillips (BDO)	3	0	3	6	15	−9	0	Eliminated

11 November

97.13 Terry Jenkins (England)	2 – 5	(Netherlands) Wesley Harms 101.79
93.39 Wes Newton (England)	5 – 2	(Wales) Martin Phillips 87.66

12 November

86.39 Terry Jenkins (England)	5 – 2	(Wales) Martin Phillips 82.41
89.84 Wes Newton (England)	5 – 2	(Netherlands) Wesley Harms 81.08

14 November

93.16 Wesley Harms (Netherlands)	5 – 2	(Wales) Martin Phillips 86.80
102.46 Wes Newton (England)	5 – 2	(England) Terry Jenkins 87.95

==== Group H ====
Pos.	Player	P	W	L	LF	LA	+/-	Pts	Status
1	(Netherlands) Raymond van Barneveld	3	2	1	14	7	+7	4	Q
2	(Netherlands) Christian Kist (BDO,3)	3	2	1	14	10	+4	4	Q
3	(England) Mark Walsh	3	2	1	10	13	−3	4	Eliminated
4	(England) Wayne Jones	3	0	3	7	15	−8	0	Eliminated

11 November

96.35 Raymond van Barneveld (Netherlands)	5 – 0	(England) Mark Walsh 85.00
97.21 Christian Kist (Netherlands)	5 – 1	(England) Wayne Jones 83.51

12 November

87.40 Mark Walsh (England)	5 – 4	(England) Wayne Jones 91.49
83.19 Christian Kist (Netherlands)	5 – 4	(Netherlands) Raymond van Barneveld 84.52

14 November

94.73 Raymond van Barneveld (Netherlands)	5 − 2	(England) Wayne Jones 91.06
90.09 Christian Kist (Netherlands)	4 − 5	(England) Mark Walsh 85.12

=== Knockout stage ===
Second round (best of 19 legs); 15–16 November
A1	(England) Scott Waites (BDO) 103.67	10
B2	(Scotland) Robert Thornton 102.42	8
B1	(Netherlands) Michael van Gerwen (8) 108.38	10
A2	(England) Phil Taylor (1) 104.89	5
C1	(England) Dean Winstanley 94.73	10
D2	(England) Arron Monk (RQ) 93.46	5
D1	(England) Mervyn King 89.63	5
C2	(England) Kevin Painter 91.10	10
E1	(Canada) John Part 89.10	10
F2	(Northern Ireland) Brendan Dolan 85.40	6
F1	(England) Andy Hamilton (7) 98.76	10
E2	(Scotland) Gary Anderson 101.90	9
G1	(England) Wes Newton (6) 93.71	9
H2	(Netherlands) Christian Kist (BDO,3) 89.78	10
H1	(Netherlands) Raymond van Barneveld 104.56	10
G2	(Netherlands) Wesley Harms (BDO) 97.50	4

Quarter-finals (best of 31 legs); 17 November
A1	(England) Scott Waites (BDO) 98.04	12
B1	(Netherlands) Michael van Gerwen (8) 106.63	16
C1	(England) Dean Winstanley 90.45	16
C2	(England) Kevin Painter 91.78	12
E1	(Canada) John Part 90.19	12
F1	(England) Andy Hamilton (7) 95.37	16
H2	(Netherlands) Christian Kist (BDO,3) 93.05	10
H1	(Netherlands) Raymond van Barneveld 100.57	16

Semi-finals (best of 31 legs); 18 November
B1	(Netherlands) Michael van Gerwen (8) 101.83	16
C1	(England) Dean Winstanley 98.94	8
F1	(England) Andy Hamilton (7) 95.87	10
H1	(Netherlands) Raymond van Barneveld 97.54	16

Final (best of 31 legs); 18 November
B1	(Netherlands) Michael van Gerwen (8) 98.55	14
H1	(Netherlands) Raymond van Barneveld 95.79	16

Scores after player's names are three-dart averages (total points scored divided by darts thrown and multiplied by 3)

== Statistics ==
Player	Eliminated	Played	Legs Won	Legs Lost	100+	140+	180s	High checkout	3-dart average
(Netherlands) Raymond van Barneveld	Winner	7	72	45	148	84	35	156	96.29
(Netherlands) Michael van Gerwen	Final	7	71	46	145	92	35	170	100.12
(England) Andy Hamilton	Semi-finals	6	51	44	117	59	17	152	94.14
(England) Dean Winstanley	Semi-finals	6	48	41	107	66	20	142	94.00
(England) Scott Waites	Quarter-finals	5	35	32	73	55	23	148	100.12
(Netherlands) Christian Kist	Quarter-finals	5	34	36	78	38	19	128	90.66
(England) Kevin Painter	Quarter-finals	5	36	33	89	46	12	121	90.38
(Canada) John Part	Quarter-finals	5	36	33	89	35	2	121	84.73
(England) Phil Taylor	Second round	4	17	18	53	26	1	164	98.93
(Scotland) Gary Anderson	Second round	4	23	23	65	27	17	130	96.94
(England) Wes Newton	Second round	4	24	16	60	20	14	164	94.85
(England) Mervyn King	Second round	4	20	16	49	29	4	126	94.68
(Netherlands) Wesley Harms	Second round	4	16	19	53	26	6	170	93.38
(Scotland) Robert Thornton	Second round	4	21	19	57	33	5	90	93.16
(Northern Ireland) Brendan Dolan	Second round	4	17	17	49	20	4	123	87.78
(England) Arron Monk	Second round	4	18	17	48	24	5	126	86.25
(Australia) Simon Whitlock	Group stage	3	11	11	25	13	7	96	91.81
(England) Mark Walsh	Group stage	3	10	13	25	12	5	164	85.84
(Netherlands) Co Stompé	Group stage	3	7	12	22	12	2	67	91.00
(Wales) Mark Webster	Group stage	3	9	13	31	12	3	131	90.13
(Australia) Paul Nicholson	Group stage	3	11	10	30	12	4	88	90.75
(England) Terry Jenkins	Group stage	3	9	12	24	12	8	78	90.49
(England) James Wade	Group stage	3	8	11	25	16	2	116	89.73
(England) Tony O'Shea	Group stage	3	13	14	36	15	9	100	88.54
(England) Adrian Lewis	Group stage	3	11	14	28	14	4	147	87.34
(England) Ted Hankey	Group stage	3	5	13	21	9	4	161	78.35
(England) Steve Beaton	Group stage	3	9	15	33	13	6	124	92.00
(England) Wayne Jones	Group stage	3	8	15	31	12	6	116	88.69
(England) James Hubbard	Group stage	3	7	15	27	7	5	100	88.14
(Wales) Martin Phillips	Group stage	3	6	15	29	13	3	61	85.62
(Netherlands) Jan Dekker	Group stage	3	3	15	10	5	2	72	76.43
(Wales) Barrie Bates	Group stage	3	2	15	19	6	1	59	75.31

Source: Match reports in the draw

== Broadcasting ==
Sky Sports provided television coverage of the event in the United Kingdom, Fox Sports in Australia, OSN across the Middle East and it was available online and partially televised on RTL7 in the Netherlands.
