= 2015 European Darts Open =

Tournament information
- Dates: 10–12 July 2015
- Venue: Maritim Hotel
- Location: Düsseldorf, Germany
- Organisation(s): Professional Darts Corporation (PDC)
- Format: Legs
- Prize fund: £115,000
- Winner's share: £25,000
- High checkout: 161 Justin Pipe

Champion(s)
- Robert Thornton (SCO)

The 2015 European Darts Open was the sixth of nine PDC European Tour events on the 2015 PDC Pro Tour. The tournament took place at the Maritim Hotel in Düsseldorf, Germany from 10 to 12 July 2015. It featured a field of 48 players and £115,000 in prize money, with £25,000 going to the winner.

Robert Thornton won his first European title after beating Kim Huybrechts 6–2 in the final.

== Prize money ==
The prize fund was increased to £115,000 after being £100,000 for the previous two years.

Stage (num. of players)		Prize money
Winner	(1)	£25,000
Runner-up	(1)	£10,000
Semi-finalists	(2)	£5,000
Quarter-finalists	(4)	£3,500
Third round losers	(8)	£2,000
Second round losers	(16)	£1,500
First round losers	(16)	£1,000
Total	£115,000	

== Qualification and format ==
The top 16 players from the PDC ProTour Order of Merit on 9 May 2015 automatically qualified for the event. The remaining 32 places went to players from three qualifying events - 20 from the UK Qualifier (held in Crawley on 15 May), eight from the European Qualifier (held in Düsseldorf on 9 July) and four from the Host Nation Qualifier (held at the venue the day before the event started). The number four seed Gary Anderson and Keegan Brown withdrew before the day before the event started due to illness. The following players took part in the tournament:

Top 16
1. (Netherlands) Michael van Gerwen (semi-finals)
2. (England) James Wade (semi-finals)
3. (Scotland) Peter Wright (second round)
4. (England) Michael Smith (third round)
5. (Northern Ireland) Brendan Dolan (quarter-finals)
6. (Australia) Simon Whitlock (third round)
7. (Netherlands) Vincent van der Voort (quarter-finals)
8. (England) Ian White (second round)
9. (England) Mervyn King (third round)
10. (England) Justin Pipe (third round)
11. (Scotland) Robert Thornton (winner)
12. (England) Terry Jenkins (third round)
13. (Belgium) Kim Huybrechts (runner-up)
14. (England) Dave Chisnall (second round)
15. (England) Steve Beaton (second round)
16. (Netherlands) Benito van de Pas (second round)

UK Qualifier
- (England) Mark Walsh (second round)
- (England) Stephen Bunting (first round)
- (Wales) Gerwyn Price (first round)
- (Scotland) John Henderson (second round)
- (England) Eddie Dootson (first round)
- (England) Andrew Gilding (first round)
- (Wales) Barrie Bates (first round)
- (Wales) Jamie Lewis (second round)
- (England) Andy Smith (first round)
- (Wales) Mark Webster (third round)
- (England) Johnny Haines (third round)
- (England) Alan Norris (quarter-finals)
- (England) Wes Newton (second round)
- (England) Joe Cullen (second round)
- (Northern Ireland) Daryl Gurney (first round)
- (South Africa) Devon Petersen (third round)
- (England) Kevin McDine (second round)
- (England) Stuart Kellett (first round)
- (England) Nathan Aspinall (first round)

European Qualifier
- (Austria) Rowby-John Rodriguez (second round)
- (Austria) Mensur Suljović (second round)
- (Belgium) Dimitri Van den Bergh (second round)
- (Netherlands) Jelle Klaasen (quarter-finals)
- (Netherlands) Christian Kist (first round)
- (Netherlands) Leo Hendriks (first round)
- (Netherlands) Dirk van Duijvenbode (second round)
- (Belgium) Mike De Decker (first round)

Host Nation Qualifier
- (Germany) Michael Rosenauer (first round)
- (Germany) Jyhan Artut (second round)
- (Germany) Tomas Seyler (first round)
- (Germany) Christian Soethe (first round)
- (Austria) Maik Langendorf (first round)

== Draw ==
First round (best of 11 legs); 10 July
(Wales) Jamie Lewis 79.81	6
(Germany) Michael Rosenauer 76.80	5
(England) Johnny Haines 84.58	6
(Germany) Christian Soethe 81.91	4
(England) Andy Smith 86.63	2
(England) Alan Norris 96.56	6
(England) Wes Newton 95.94	6
(Wales) Gerwyn Price 85.43	0
(England) Mark Walsh 81.06	6
(Germany) Tomas Seyler 76.32	2
(England) Andrew Gilding 90.36	5
(Scotland) John Henderson 83.92	6
(Austria) Mensur Suljović 94.67	6
(Belgium) Mike De Decker 90.20	5
(England) Stephen Bunting 93.35	3
(Germany) Jyhan Artut 89.55	6
(Netherlands) Dirk van Duijvenbode 88.94	6
(Netherlands) Leo Hendriks 79.89	3
(Wales) Mark Webster 87.44	6
(England) Stuart Kellett 79.04	2
(Austria) Rowby-John Rodriguez 90.50	6
(Wales) Barrie Bates 78.85	1
(Northern Ireland) Daryl Gurney 93.92	5
(England) Kevin McDine 90.84	6
(England) Joe Cullen 96.85	6
(Austria) Maik Langendorf 85.55	3
(Netherlands) Christian Kist 100.35	3
(Belgium) Dimitri Van den Bergh 99.97	6
(South Africa) Devon Petersen 88.61	6
(England) Nathan Aspinall 92.70	5
(Netherlands) Jelle Klaasen 100.70	6
(England) Eddie Dootson 91.25	3

Second round (best of 11 legs); 11 July
1	(Netherlands) Michael van Gerwen 92.59	6
(Wales) Jamie Lewis 87.89	1
16	(Netherlands) Benito van de Pas 90.28	3
(England) Johnny Haines 88.66	6
8	(England) Ian White 90.85	5
(England) Alan Norris 84.21	6
9	(England) Mervyn King 95.78	6
(England) Wes Newton 97.23	3
5	(Northern Ireland) Brendan Dolan 90.86	6
(England) Mark Walsh 80.73	2
12	(England) Terry Jenkins 102.73	6
(Scotland) John Henderson 94.72	1
4	(England) Michael Smith 99.41	6
(Austria) Mensur Suljović 104.82	4
13	(Belgium) Kim Huybrechts 105.47	6
(Germany) Jyhan Artut 104.14	4
2	(England) James Wade 100.20	6
(Netherlands) Dirk van Duijvenbode 78.79	0
15	(England) Steve Beaton 93.89	1
(Wales) Mark Webster 101.56	6
7	(Netherlands) Vincent van der Voort 96.43	6
(Austria) Rowby-John Rodriguez 94.86	2
10	(England) Justin Pipe 93.21	6
(England) Kevin McDine 94.04	4
6	(Australia) Simon Whitlock 99.18	6
(England) Joe Cullen 101.28	5
11	(Scotland) Robert Thornton 102.19	6
(Belgium) Dimitri Van den Bergh 95.81	5
3	(Scotland) Peter Wright 88.60	5
(South Africa) Devon Petersen 92.53	6
14	(England) Dave Chisnall 101.74	1
(Netherlands) Jelle Klaasen 104.69	6

Third round (best of 11 legs); 12 July
1	(Netherlands) van Gerwen 101.47	6
(England) Haines 89.65	1
(England) Norris 96.51	6
9	(England) King 96.04	5
5	(Northern Ireland) Dolan 93.55	6
12	(England) Jenkins 99.41	4
4	(England) M. Smith 96.10	4
13	(Belgium) Huybrechts 97.64	6
2	(England) Wade 98.86	6
(Wales) Webster 90.82	4
7	(Netherlands) van der Voort 99.49	6
10	(England) Pipe 88.39	1
6	(Australia) Whitlock 89.75	3
11	(Scotland) Thornton 100.24	6
(South Africa) Petersen 90.10	0
(Netherlands) Klaasen 94.93	6

Quarter-finals (best of 11 legs); 12 July
1	(Netherlands) van Gerwen 105.33	6
(England) Norris 97.89	3
5	(Northern Ireland) Dolan 81.76	3
13	(Belgium) Huybrechts 91.39	6
2	(England) Wade 99.64	6
7	(Netherlands) van der Voort 93.21	3
11	(Scotland) Thornton 96.36	6
(Netherlands) Klaasen 88.26	4

Semi-finals (best of 11 legs); 12 July
1	(Netherlands) van Gerwen 96.58	3
13	(Belgium) Huybrechts 94.17	6
2	(England) Wade 98.12	1
11	(Scotland) Thornton 111.77	6

Final (best of 11 legs); 12 July
13	(Belgium) Huybrechts 100.69	2
11	(Scotland) Thornton 106.18	6
