= 2013 German Darts Championship =

Tournament information
- Dates: 6–8 September 2013
- Venue: Halle 39
- Location: Hildesheim
- Country: Germany
- Organisation(s): PDC
- Format: Legs
- Prize fund: £100,000
- Winner's share: £20,000

Champion(s)
- (England) Dave Chisnall

The 2013 German Darts Championship was the sixth of eight PDC European Tour events on the 2013 PDC Pro Tour. The tournament took place at Halle 39 in Hildesheim, Germany, between 6–8 September 2013. It featured a field of 64 players and £100,000 in prize money, with £20,000 going to the winner.

Dave Chisnall won his first European Tour title by defeating Peter Wright 6–2 in the final.

== Prize money ==
Stage (num. of players)		Prize money
Winner	(1)	£20,000
Runner-up	(1)	£10,000
Semi-finalists	(2)	£5,000
Quarter-finalists	(4)	£3,000
Third round losers	(8)	£2,000
Second round losers	(16)	£1,000
First round losers	(32)	£500
Total	£100,000	

== Qualification ==
The top 32 players from the PDC ProTour Order of Merit on 11 June 2013 automatically qualified for the event. The remaining 32 places went to players from three qualifying events - 20 from the UK Qualifier (held in Crawley on 21 June), eight from the European Qualifier and four from the Host Nation Qualifier (both held at the venue in Hildesheim on 5 September).

James Wade was replaced by an additional European qualifier, due to a PDC-banning after the draw. Phil Taylor withdrew and was replaced by an additional Host Nation qualifier.

1–32

1. (Netherlands) Michael van Gerwen (third round)
2. (Australia) Simon Whitlock (third round)
3. (Scotland) Robert Thornton (second round)
4. (England) Dave Chisnall (winner)
5. (England) Wes Newton (second round)
6. (England) Jamie Caven (quarter-final)
7. (Belgium) Kim Huybrechts (first round)
8. (Canada) John Part (first round)
9. (England) Mervyn King (second round)
10. (Scotland) Peter Wright (runner-up)
11. (England) Adrian Lewis (first round)
12. (Netherlands) Raymond van Barneveld (first round)
13. (Australia) Paul Nicholson (third round)
14. (England) Ian White (second round)
15. (England) Ronnie Baxter (second round)
16. ~~(England) Phil Taylor (withdrew)~~
17. (England) Andy Hamilton (quarter-finals)
18. (England) Colin Lloyd (first round)
19. (Scotland) Gary Anderson (first round)
20. (England) Stuart Kellett (first round)
21. (England) Justin Pipe (third round)
22. (Northern Ireland) Brendan Dolan (second round)
23. ~~(England) James Wade (banned)~~
24. (England) Steve Beaton (semi-finals)
25. (England) Andy Smith (third round)
26. (England) Terry Jenkins (second round)
27. (England) Mark Walsh (first round)
28. (England) Kevin Painter (quarter-finals)
29. (England) Arron Monk (second round)
30. (Wales) Richie Burnett (semi-finals)
31. (Wales) Mark Webster (first round)
32. (England) Colin Osborne (second round)

UK Qualifier

- (England) David Pallett (first round)
- (England) Steve Brown (third round)
- (England) Terry Temple (first round)
- (England) James Richardson (first round)
- (England) Darren Webster (second round)
- (England) Michael Smith (first round)
- (England) Dean Winstanley (first round)
- (England) John Scott (first round)
- (England) Alan Tabern (first round)
- (England) Matt Clark (first round)
- (Scotland) John Henderson (first round)
- (England) Dennis Smith (second round)
- (England) Matthew Edgar (second round)
- (England) Kevin Dowling (first round)
- (England) Darren Johnson (first round)
- (Northern Ireland) Daryl Gurney (quarter-finals)
- (England) Michael Barnard (first round)
- (England) Nigel Heydon (first round)
- (England) Mark Dudbridge (second round)
- (England) Ricky Evans (first round)

European Qualifier

- (Netherlands) Jelle Klaasen (third round)
- (Sweden) Magnus Caris (first round)
- (Netherlands) Vincent van der Voort (third round)
- (Austria) Maik Langendorf (first round)
- (Netherlands) Roland Scholten (first round)
- (Belgium) Ronny Huybrechts (first round)
- (Netherlands) Jerry Hendriks (first round)
- (Austria) Michael Rasztovits (first round)
- (Netherlands) Richard van Zijtveld (first round)

Host Nation Qualifier

- (Germany) Adrian Kazimierz (first round)
- (Germany) Michael Hurtz (second round)
- (Germany) Tomas Seyler (first round)
- (Germany) Max Hopp (second round)
- (Germany) Jyhan Artut (second round)

== Draw ==
First round (best of 11 legs); 6 September
1	(Netherlands) Michael van Gerwen 99.60	6
(England) Terry Temple 85.78	2
32	(England) Colin Osborne 79.26	6
(England) Nigel Heydon 85.60	5
Alt	(Germany) Jyhan Artut 84.58	6
(England) David Pallett 85.25	3
17	(England) Andy Hamilton 84.81	6
(Netherlands) Jerry Hendriks 79.84	3
8	(Canada) John Part 87.33	3
(England) Darren Webster 87.97	6
25	(England) Andy Smith 90.23	6
(England) Michael Barnard 85.59	2
9	(England) Mervyn King 93.70	6
(Germany) Adrian Kazimierz 60.46	1
24	(England) Steve Beaton 95.85	6
(Scotland) John Henderson 82.06	2
5	(England) Wes Newton 95.59	6
(Austria) Maik Langendorf 83.31	2
28	(England) Kevin Painter 91.61	6
(England) Kevin Dowling 83.81	4
12	(Netherlands) Raymond van Barneveld 82.82	5
(England) Dennis Smith 79.00	6
21	(England) Justin Pipe 93.15	6
(Belgium) Ronny Huybrechts 81.67	3
4	(England) Dave Chisnall 97.90	6
(England) Dean Winstanley 97.56	5
29	(England) Arron Monk 90.58	6
(England) John Scott 84.70	5
13	(Australia) Paul Nicholson 85.47	6
(Germany) Tomas Seyler 76.15	3
20	(England) Stuart Kellett 85.68	1
(England) Matthew Edgar 89.20	6
2	(Australia) Simon Whitlock 98.96	6
(England) Alan Tabern 91.88	4
31	(Wales) Mark Webster 85.28	4
(England) Mark Dudbridge 90.19	6
15	(England) Ronnie Baxter 95.89	6
(England) Michael Smith 99.22	4
18	(England) Colin Lloyd 96.23	5
(Northern Ireland) Daryl Gurney 91.33	6
7	(Belgium) Kim Huybrechts 90.25	5
(Netherlands) Jelle Klaasen 91.56	6
26	(England) Terry Jenkins 91.17	6
(Austria) Michael Rasztovits 83.23	1
10	(Scotland) Peter Wright 103.22	6
(England) Ricky Evans 85.44	1
Alt	(Netherlands) Richard van Zijtveld 77.90	3
(Germany) Michael Hurtz 88.64	6
6	(England) Jamie Caven 94.36	6
(England) Darren Johnson 86.29	2
27	(England) Mark Walsh 85.11	4
(Germany) Max Hopp 85.89	6
11	(England) Adrian Lewis 89.92	2
(Netherlands) Vincent van der Voort 99.66	6
22	(Northern Ireland) Brendan Dolan 96.19	6
(Sweden) Magnus Caris 91.84	3
3	(Scotland) Robert Thornton 82.73	6
(Netherlands) Roland Scholten 82.40	3
30	(Wales) Richie Burnett 94.82	6
(England) James Richardson 94.05	5
14	(England) Ian White 96.86	6
(England) Matt Clark 87.71	1
19	(Scotland) Gary Anderson 100.11	2
(England) Steve Brown 93.83	6

Second round (best of 11 legs); 7 September
1	(Netherlands) van Gerwen 109.98	6
32	(England) Osborne 81.37	0
Alt	(Germany) Artut 80.24	1
17	(England) Hamilton 78.59	6
(England) D. Webster 81.99	1
25	(England) A. Smith 81.74	6
9	(England) King 89.76	5
24	(England) Beaton 88.20	6
5	(England) Newton 97.02	4
28	(England) Painter 92.52	6
(England) D. Smith 85.72	1
21	(England) Pipe 91.12	6
4	(England) Chisnall 99.07	6
29	(England) Monk 92.49	5
13	(Australia) Nicholson 97.69	6
(England) Edgar 89.31	2
2	(Australia) Whitlock 94.87	6
(England) Dudbridge 92.59	1
15	(England) Baxter 88.27	3
(Northern Ireland) Gurney 93.19	6
(Netherlands) Klaasen 90.99	6
26	(England) Jenkins 88.09	3
10	(Scotland) Wright 94.08	6
(Germany) Hurtz 87.47	3
6	(England) Caven 94.95	6
(Germany) Hopp 88.49	3
(Netherlands) van der Voort 88.80	6
22	(Northern Ireland) Dolan 89.66	2
3	(Scotland) Thornton 87.94	5
30	(Wales) Burnett 86.53	6
14	(England) White 90.85	2
(England) Brown 95.55	6

Third round (best of 11 legs); 8 September
1	(Netherlands) van Gerwen 100.73	4
17	(England) Hamilton 97.64	6
25	(England) A. Smith 88.84	5
24	(England) Beaton 95.19	6
28	(England) Painter 88.36	6
21	(England) Pipe 86.45	4
4	(England) Chisnall 93.86	6
13	(Australia) Nicholson 90.59	5
2	(Australia) Whitlock 94.03	5
(Northern Ireland) Gurney 90.71	6
(Netherlands) Klaasen 99.43	3
10	(Scotland) Wright 97.46	6
6	(England) Caven 92.44	6
(Netherlands) van der Voort 85.74	1
30	(Wales) Burnett 101.85	6
(England) Brown 84.18	2

Quarter-finals (best of 11 legs); 8 September
17	(England) Hamilton 87.37	3
24	(England) Beaton 93.59	6
28	(England) Painter 84.45	5
4	(England) Chisnall 94.05	6
(Northern Ireland) Daryl Gurney 90.28	2
10	(Scotland) Wright 94.18	6
6	(England) Caven 91.83	4
30	(Wales) Burnett 91.57	6

Semi-finals (best of 11 legs); 8 September
24	(England) Beaton 95.30	4
4	(England) Chisnall 106.30	6
10	(Scotland) Wright 95.69	6
30	(Wales) Burnett 92.84	5

Final (best of 11 legs); 8 September
4	(England) Chisnall 99.44	6
10	(Scotland) Wright 95.18	2
