= 2013 Gibraltar Darts Trophy =

Tournament information
- Dates: 28–30 June 2013
- Venue: Victoria Stadium
- Location: Gibraltar
- Organisation(s): Professional Darts Corporation (PDC)
- Format: Legs
- Prize fund: £100,000
- Winner's share: £20,000
- Nine-dart finish: Ross Smith

Champion(s)
- (England) Phil Taylor

The 2013 Gibraltar Darts Trophy was the fifth of eight PDC European Tour events on the 2013 PDC Pro Tour. The tournament took place at the Victoria Stadium, Gibraltar, from 28–30 June 2013. It featured a field of 64 players and £100,000 in prize money, with £20,000 going to the winner. It was won by Phil Taylor, with Jamie Lewis as the runner-up.

Also notable was the nine-dart finish hit by Ross Smith in his second round defeat by Adrian Lewis, which was the last nine darter to be hit in the PDC European Tour until June 2018.

== Course of the event ==
Phil Taylor won his second European Tour title with a 6–1 victory over Jamie Lewis in the final. He had previously beaten Steve Beaton 6-0 in the last eight and Dave Chisnall 6-2 in the semi-finals, recording an average score of 112.73 in the former. The £20,000 first prize was Taylor's second win in June 2013, having earlier won the 2013 UK Open title. Taylor's victory was his first European Tour win since Berlin in June 2012, adding to a career that has led to him being called the greatest ever darts player. He told the Staffordshire newspaper The Sentinel, "It's fantastic to win this and I am over the moon. It's been a great weekend for me and I've really enjoyed it in Gibraltar."

The tournament's biggest surprise was Jamie Lewis' appearance in the final. He reached his first senior final after having to qualify to take part in the event, and was aiming to win one match and the £1,000 prize money, so that he would earn a place in the world top 64 and would avoid having to need to qualify for the 2014 PDC European Tour.

The event was the first-ever Gibraltar Darts Trophy, sponsored by the Government of Gibraltar at a reported cost of £100,000. Although it was not broadcast live, it was covered by Sky Sports. The trophy was presented by the territory's Sports Minister, Stephen Linares. Four Gibraltarian players participated as home nation qualifiers, but were all eliminated in the opening round.

== Prize money ==
Stage (num. of players)		Prize money
Winner	(1)	£20,000
Runner-up	(1)	£10,000
Semi-finalists	(2)	£5,000
Quarter-finalists	(4)	£3,000
Third round losers	(8)	£2,000
Second round losers	(16)	£1,000
First round losers	(32)	£500
Total	£100,000	

== Qualification ==
The top 32 players from the PDC ProTour Order of Merit on the 22 May 2013 automatically qualified for the event. The remaining 32 places went to players from three qualifying events - 20 from the UK Qualifier (held in Wigan on 24 May), eight from the European Qualifier (held at the venue in Gibraltar on 27 June) and four from the Host Nation Qualifier (held in Gibraltar on 24 April).

1–32

1. (Netherlands) Michael van Gerwen (quarter-finals)
2. (Australia) Simon Whitlock (first round)
3. (England) Dave Chisnall (semi-finals)
4. (Scotland) Robert Thornton (second round)
5. (England) Wes Newton (first round)
6. (Belgium) Kim Huybrechts (quarter-finals)
7. (Canada) John Part (second round)
8. (England) Ian White (second round)
9. (England) Adrian Lewis (semi-finals)
10. (England) Phil Taylor (winner)
11. (Scotland) Peter Wright (third round)
12. (England) Ronnie Baxter (second round)
13. (Australia) Paul Nicholson (second round)
14. (England) Andy Hamilton (third round)
15. (England) Mervyn King (first round)
16. (England) Stuart Kellett (first round)
17. (England) Colin Lloyd (third round)
18. (England) Justin Pipe (second round)
19. (Scotland) Gary Anderson (second round)
20. (Northern Ireland) Brendan Dolan (first round)
21. (England) James Wade (third round)
22. (Wales) Mark Webster (first round)
23. (England) Mark Walsh (first round)
24. (England) Andy Smith (first round)
25. (England) Jamie Caven (third round)
26. (England) Arron Monk (first round)
27. (Wales) Richie Burnett (second round)
28. (England) Kevin Painter (quarter-finals)
29. (England) Colin Osborne (first round)
30. (England) Wayne Jones (first round)
31. (England) Steve Beaton (quarter-finals)
32. (England) Scott Rand (second round)

UK Qualifier

- (England) Peter Hudson (first round)
- (Scotland) John Henderson (third round)
- (England) Kevin McDine (first round)
- (England) Joe Cullen (first round)
- (England) Joe Murnan (first round)
- (Republic of Ireland) Connie Finnan (second round)
- (England) Steve Maish (first round)
- (England) Nigel Heydon (first round)
- (Wales) Jamie Lewis (runner-up)
- (Northern Ireland) Mickey Mansell (first round)
- (England) Mark Hylton (first round)
- (Scotland) Jim Walker (first round)
- (England) Dean Winstanley (second round)
- (England) Matthew Dennant (first round)
- (England) Ross Smith (second round)
- (England) John Bowles (first round)
- (England) Matthew Edgar (first round)
- (England) Paul Amos (second round)
- (England) Steve Brown (third round)
- (England) Josh Payne (second round)

European Qualifier

- (Netherlands) Gino Vos (first round)
- (Netherlands) Vincent van der Voort (first round)
- (Belgium) Ronny Huybrechts (first round)
- (Austria) Mensur Suljović (second round)
- (Finland) Jani Haavisto (second round)
- (Netherlands) Leo Hendriks (first round)
- (Netherlands) Jelle Klaasen (first round)
- (Netherlands) Leon de Geus (third round)

Host Nation Qualifier

- (Gibraltar) Dylan Duo (first round)
- (Gibraltar) Dyson Parody (first round)
- (Gibraltar) Manuel Vilerio (first round)
- (Gibraltar) George Federico (first round)

== Draw ==
First round (best of 11 legs); 28 June
1	(Netherlands) Michael van Gerwen 94.10	6
(England) John Bowles 86.23	2
32	(England) Scott Rand 88.73	6
(Scotland) Jim Walker 86.51	4
16	(England) Stuart Kellett 86.13	4
(Finland) Jani Haavisto 87.53	6
17	(England) Colin Lloyd 90.07	6
(Netherlands) Vincent van der Voort 91.59	2
8	(England) Ian White 91.90	6
(England) Kevin McDine 85.53	3
25	(England) Jamie Caven 94.09	6
(Netherlands) Leo Hendriks 84.75	2
9	(England) Adrian Lewis 95.89	6
(Northern Ireland) Mickey Mansell 94.02	5
24	(England) Andy Smith 91.11	3
(England) Ross Smith 102.02	6
5	(England) Wes Newton 94.18	5
(Austria) Mensur Suljović 98.30	6
28	(England) Kevin Painter 88.18	6
(Belgium) Ronny Huybrechts 84.59	3
12	(England) Ronnie Baxter 80.85	6
(England) Matthew Edgar 78.07	1
21	(England) James Wade 101.19	6
(England) Joe Murnan 93.63	3
4	(Scotland) Robert Thornton 99.53	6
(England) Matthew Dennant 86.88	4
29	(England) Colin Osborne 90.17	4
(Wales) Jamie Lewis 88.55	6
13	(Australia) Paul Nicholson 90.57	6
(England) Joe Cullen 81.73	5
20	(Northern Ireland) Brendan Dolan 105.04	4
(England) Steve Brown 94.34	6
2	(Australia) Simon Whitlock 88.73	3
(Republic of Ireland) Connie Finnan 87.10	6
31	(England) Steve Beaton 87.20	6
(Gibraltar) George Federico 70.05	2
15	(England) Mervyn King 96.54	4
(Scotland) John Henderson 97.55	6
18	(England) Justin Pipe 100.26	6
(England) Steve Maish 81.31	2
7	(Canada) John Part 85.11	6
(England) Nigel Heydon 88.42	4
26	(England) Arron Monk 95.20	3
(Netherlands) Leon de Geus 93.22	6
10	(England) Phil Taylor 115.31	6
(Netherlands) Gino Vos 86.61	2
23	(England) Mark Walsh 93.57	5
(England) Dean Winstanley 94.46	6
6	(Belgium) Kim Huybrechts 101.06	6
(England) Peter Hudson 87.47	2
27	(Wales) Richie Burnett 89.62	6
(Netherlands) Jelle Klaasen 94.12	3
11	(Scotland) Peter Wright 101.33	6
(England) Mark Hylton 93.93	0
22	(Wales) Mark Webster 90.23	4
(England) Paul Amos 92.59	6
3	(England) Dave Chisnall 96.97	6
(Gibraltar) Manuel Vilerio 74.83	0
30	(England) Wayne Jones 83.01	2
(England) Josh Payne 87.16	6
14	(England) Andy Hamilton 97.01	6
(Gibraltar) Dyson Parody 88.06	3
19	(Scotland) Gary Anderson 92.97	6
(Gibraltar) Dylan Duo 75.03	0

Second round (best of 11 legs); 29 June
1	(Netherlands) van Gerwen 95.07	6
32	(England) Rand 85.29	2
(Finland) Haavisto 83.09	4
17	(England) Lloyd 85.90	6
8	(England) White 101.52	2
25	(England) Caven 104.67	6
9	(England) A. Lewis 91.17	6
(England) R. Smith 90.95	5
(Austria) Suljović 79.65	1
28	(England) Painter 96.47	6
12	(England) Baxter 97.58	5
21	(England) Wade 95.30	6
4	(Scotland) Thornton 97.22	5
(Wales) J. Lewis 88.59	6
13	(Australia) Nicholson 91.49	3
(England) Brown 93.04	6
(Republic of Ireland) Finnan 81.20	5
31	(England) Beaton 85.95	6
(Scotland) Henderson 88.22	6
18	(England) Pipe 88.96	4
7	(Canada) Part 79.97	1
(Netherlands) de Geus 81.97	6
10	(England) Taylor 88.75	6
(England) Winstanley 74.02	1
6	(Belgium) K. Huybrechts 102.48	6
27	(Wales) Burnett 84.64	0
11	(Scotland) Wright 94.82	6
(England) Amos 84.99	5
3	(England) Chisnall 104.76	6
(England) Payne 100.50	1
14	(England) Hamilton 92.76	6
19	(Scotland) Anderson 105.50	5

Third round (best of 11 legs); 30 June
1	(Netherlands) van Gerwen 90.49	6
17	(England) Lloyd 75.83	1
25	(England) Caven 90.76	4
9	(England) A. Lewis 93.10	6
28	(England) Painter 93.26	6
21	(England) Wade 100.80	3
(Wales) J. Lewis 93.94	6
(England) Brown 82.16	0
31	(England) Beaton 94.69	6
(Scotland) Henderson 93.37	5
(Netherlands) de Geus 87.60	1
10	(England) Taylor 97.49	6
6	(Belgium) K. Huybrechts 102.72	6
11	(Scotland) Wright 103.06	4
3	(England) Chisnall 111.26	6
14	(England) Hamilton 99.94	3

Quarter-finals (best of 11 legs); 30 June
1	(Netherlands) van Gerwen 90.40	5
9	(England) A. Lewis 97.72	6
28	(England) Painter 86.74	5
(Wales) J. Lewis 93.91	6
31	(England) Beaton 102.54	0
10	(England) Taylor 112.73	6
6	(Belgium) K. Huybrechts 96.60	4
3	(England) Chisnall 96.74	6

Semi-finals (best of 11 legs); 30 June
9	(England) A. Lewis 93.45	5
J. Lewis 84.05	6
10	(England) Taylor 102.69	6
3	(England) Chisnall 99.42	2

Final (best of 11 legs); 30 June
(Wales) J. Lewis 90.50	1
10	(England) Taylor 101.42	6
