= Leo Hendriks =

Dutch darts player

Personal information
- Nickname: White Wolf
- Born: 12 July 1983 (age 43) The Hague, Netherlands
- Home town: 's-Hertogenbosch, Netherlands

Sport
- Sport: Darts
- Laterality: Both handed
- Walk-on music: Lose Yourself by Eminem

Organisation (see split in darts)
- BDO: 2014–2015
- PDC: 2012–2014, 2015–
- Current world ranking: 264

Leo Hendriks (born 12 July 1983) is a Dutch darts player who plays in Professional Darts Corporation events.

== Career ==
Hendriks started playing in PDC events in 2012. He played in two European Tour event qualifiers, losing in the final round of both. In 2013 he participated in the PDC Q-School, but didn't win a Tour card for the PDC Pro Tour. The other PDC tournaments he participated in were the seven European Tour Qualifiers, qualifying for the European Darts Trophy (where he lost to Michael van Gerwen in the first round) and the Gibraltar Darts Trophy (where he lost to Jamie Caven in the first round).

In 2014 he participated in the PDC Q-school again, but didn't win a Tour card for the PDC Pro Tour. The other PDC tournaments he participated in were the first three European Tour Qualifiers, but after that his second daughter was born and he didn't participate in any other international tournament in 2014.

In 2015 he switched to the BDO, but after some minor successes (third place warm up tournament Romanian Open, 9th place Romanian Open and 9th place Isle of Man Open) he started playing in PDC events once again. He qualified for the 2015 European Darts Open where he was beaten 6–3 by Dirk van Duijvenbode in the opening round.
