= Wes Newton =

English darts player (born 1977)

Personal information
- Full name: Wesley Newton
- Nickname: "The Warrior"
- Born: 27 August 1977 (age 49) Blackpool, England
- Home town: Fleetwood, England

Sport
- Sport: Darts
- Playing since: 1996
- Darts: 22 Gram Red Dragon Signature
- Laterality: Right-handed
- Walk-on music: "Crazy Crazy Nights" by Kiss

Organisation (see split in darts)
- BDO: 2018–2020
- PDC: 2002–2023 (Tour Card: 2011–2017)
- WDF: 2018–2024

WDF major events – best performances
- World Championship: Preliminary Round: 2019
- World Masters: Last 48: 2018
- World Trophy: Last 32: 2019

PDC premier events – best performances
- World Championship: Quarter Final: 2011, 2013, 2014
- World Matchplay: Quarter Final: 2011, 2014
- World Grand Prix: Semi Final: 2012
- UK Open: Runner Up: 2011
- Grand Slam: Last 16: 2011, 2012
- European Championship: Runner Up: 2012
- Premier League: 9th: 2013, 2014
- Championship League: Semi Final: 2013
- Desert Classic: Semi Final: 2005, 2006
- US Open/WSoD: Semi Final: 2009
- PC Finals: Semi Final: 2011, 2014
- Masters: Quarter Final: 2013

Other tournament wins
- Years
Grand Slam Wild Card Qualifier	2008
Lancashire Open	2008
Las Vegas Open	2009
Lytham St Annes Open	2009
Oldham Open	2010
UK Open Qualifier	2012, 2012
European Tour Events
European Darts Trophy	2013
Players Championships
Players Championship (BAR)	2010, 2010
Players Championship (CRA)	2011
Players Championship (SCO)	2009
Players Championship (WIG)	2010

Other achievements
- 2012 Throws first televised nine-dart finish during the World Matchplay.

Wesley Newton (born 27 August 1977) is an English professional darts player.

== Darts career ==
Newton's first PDC major was the 2003 UK Open where he lost 8–6 to Mark Thomson in the last 32. He was beaten in the semi-finals of the Eastbourne Open in 2003 and 2004 and reached the first final of his career at the Golden Harvest North American Cup, but lost 4–0 to John Part. Newton qualified for the 2004 Las Vegas Desert Classic and was beaten 2–1 by Wayne Mardle in the first round. His World Championship debut came in 2005 when he lost 3–0 to Gerry Convery in the second round. His first semi-final in a major event was at the 2005 Las Vegas Desert Classic where he knocked out George Walls, Mark Walsh and Ray Carver, before losing 4–0 to Phil Taylor. Newton suffered a broken collarbone by slipping in the shower shortly after the event which kept him out of action for three months but returned to play in his first World Grand Prix, losing 3–0 in the second round to Colin Lloyd.

His second attempt in the World Championship ended with a second round 4–3 defeat to Kevin Painter. He reached the semi-finals of the Las Vegas Desert Classic for the second successive year but was denied a place in the final as John Part beat him 4–2. Newton's form saw him make his debut in the World Matchplay but he could only average 82.38 as Part comfortably beat him 10–2.

Newton lost in the second round of the World Championship again in 2007 this time 4–2 against Colin Osborne. In June, at a Players Championship event at Hayling Island he reached his first final on the PDC Pro Tour but was whitewashed 3–0 by Terry Jenkins. He couldn't translate his form into the major events, however, as he only reached the last 16 once which came in Las Vegas where he lost 8–7 to Jenkins.

Newton suffered a 3–0 first round exit in the 2008 World Championship to qualifier Jamie Caven. He won the Wildcard Qualifier for the 2008 Grand Slam of Darts, beating Colin McGarry in the final. He was drawn into Group F with Terry Jenkins, Colin Lloyd and American Darin Young where Newton defeated Lloyd and Young in his first two games to stand a great chance of qualifying for the knockout stages. However, Newton would go on to lose to Jenkins 0–5 and Young beat Lloyd to pip him to second place and knock Newton out.

Newton entered the 2009 PDC World Championship as the number 31 seed and defeated Denmark's Per Laursen in the first round, before falling to Raymond van Barneveld in round two. After the tournament, he fell outside the top 32 on the PDC Order of Merit, eventually dropping as low as 36th. Newton won the WDF-ranked Las Vegas Open on 25 January 2009.

Newton made the second round of the 2010 World Championship after defeating Jarkko Komula in the first round 3–0. However, he came up against an in-form Adrian Lewis in the second round, falling to a 2–4 defeat. On the weekend of 7/8 November 2010, Newton won two Players Championship tournaments in the same weekend, only the fifth player to do so. This followed qualifying for the Grand Slam of Darts on the evening of 6 November. As a result of his double win, Newton broke into the top 16 in the Order of Merit for the first time in his career. At the Grand Slam, he was knocked out in the group stage after defeating Michael van Gerwen and losing to Ted Hankey and Phil Taylor.

=== 2011 ===
Newton continued his progress at the 2011 World Championship, defeating Darin Young, Brendan Dolan and Mensur Suljović on the way to the quarter-finals. He then led Terry Jenkins 4–3 in his quarter-final, before Jenkins fought back to win 5–4. In March 2011, Newton moved into the top eight of the PDC Order of Merit, following a win in a Pro Tour event in Crawley.

At the 2011 UK Open, Newton progressed to his first televised final. On the way to the final, he beat John Henderson, Michael van Gerwen, Raymond van Barneveld, Dave Chisnall and Denis Ovens, but succumbed to James Wade losing 8–11. As a result of his run to the final, he qualified for the 2011 Grand Slam of Darts by right. After the UK Open, it was announced that Newton had appointed three-time world finalist Peter Manley as his manager.

At the 2011 World Matchplay, Newton beat Andy Smith in the first round 10–2, making it past the first round for the first time in the tournament. Newton then beat Justin Pipe 13–8 in the second round, hitting a 9-darter, before losing 5–16 to Phil Taylor in the quarter-finals.

=== 2012 ===
Newton breezed through the first round of the 2012 World Championship by whitewashing Kurt van de Rijck 3–0 and played Justin Pipe in the last 32. He won the first two sets but then seemed to become distracted by Pipe's slow style and lost the next three. Newton managed to take the match into a deciding set but could not break Pipe's throw and lost 3–4.

At the first UK Open qualifier in February, Newton beat Kim Huybrechts 6–3 in the final to receive £6,000. He also beat Kevin Dowling, Andy Brown, Robert Thornton, Jerry Hendriks and Richie Howson on the way to the final. He also won the eighth qualifier three months later with a 6–2 victory over Justin Pipe in the final. In the UK Open itself he lost to eventual winner Robert Thornton in the quarter-finals. At the World Matchplay, Newton beat James Hubbard 10–5 in the first round, before throwing the first televised nine-dart finish of his career in the 11th leg of his last 16 match against Justin Pipe. However, despite being 9–7 up in the game, he went on to lose 10–13.

Newton reached his second PDC major final in September's European Championship in Mülheim, Germany. He beat Tomas Seyler, Kevin Painter and then Andy Hamilton in the quarter-finals to face his room-mate Brendan Dolan in the semis. Newton produced a superb comeback to take five successive legs from 6–9 to down to triumph 11–9, before losing to Simon Whitlock 5–11 in the final. At the World Grand Prix, he was a dart away from exiting the tournament in the first round to Ronnie Baxter, but his opponent missed and Newton went on to win 2–1 in sets, before beating Ian White 3–1 in the last 16. He once again produced a comeback in his quarter-final against Paul Nicholson, as he took the match 3–2, despite being 0–2 down. In his semi-final against Michael van Gerwen, Newton was heavily out-scored in a 1–5 defeat. Newton qualified from Group 1 of the Championship League with a 6–3 victory against Adrian Lewis, in a group that contained the top eight players in the Order of Merit. However, he finished 7th in the Winners Group, winning just two of his seven matches. Newton topped Group G in the Grand Slam of Darts with wins over Martin Phillips, Wesley Harms and Terry Jenkins to face BDO player Christian Kist in the last 16. Newton trailed 3–7, but came back to tie the match at 9–9, before failing to hold his throw to claim the win. After all 33 ProTour events of 2012 had been played, Newton finished seventh on the Order of Merit to qualify for the Players Championship Finals where he lost to Gary Anderson 4–6 in the first round.

=== 2013 ===
Newton dropped just one set as he cruised into the quarter-finals of the 2013 World Championship. He faced third seed James Wade and won the first two sets before losing the next four, which included four missed darts to lead 3–1. Newton produced a fightback to level the match but missed two darts to hold throw in the third leg of the deciding set and lost the next leg to exit the tournament. By reaching the final of the European Championship last year, Newton qualified for the Premier League for the first time. He could only win two matches out of his first eight and went into week nine knowing he needed to beat Andy Hamilton in order to avoid relegation. Newton lost the match 7–5 and blamed his scoring throughout the season as the reason for his early exit.

Newton won his first European Tour title in April, the European Darts Trophy in Sindelfingen, Germany, by defeating Paul Nicholson 6–5 in the final. Newton described it as the best win of his career after the match. A tough draw at the UK Open saw him beat Simon Whitlock 9–4 in the third round, before meeting Adrian Lewis. Newton threw a nine-darter to level the game at 4–4 and the match went into a last leg decider with Newton missing three darts to win, before Lewis stepped in to triumph 9–8. Both players averaged over 100 during the game. He reached the final of the fifth Players Championship by beating Michael van Gerwen 6–4 in the semi-finals, but lost 6–1 to Peter Wright. He was beaten 6–4 by Jelle Klaasen in the first round of the European Championship and squandered 5–2 and 7–4 leads over Jamie Caven in the opening round of the World Matchplay to lose 10–8. Newton advanced to the Winners Group of the Championship League by winning Group 3 with a 6–4 success over Dave Chisnall. He qualified for the play-offs by finishing fourth in the table before losing 6–1 to Phil Taylor. Newton lost 9–4 to Van Gerwen in the quarter-finals of the Players Championship Finals.

=== 2014 ===
Newton reached the quarter-finals of the World Championship once more and missed two darts to take a 4–2 lead over Peter Wright. The match went into a deciding set with Newton losing it 5–3 in legs to bow out of the event via a 5–4 defeat in the quarter-finals for the third time in four years. In the Premier League, Newton won two out of his first three games, but couldn't win any of his next six to be eliminated after week nine for the second year in a row. Newton had a poor season by his standards as he failed to win a PDC tournament for the first time since 2007. He did beat Ronnie Baxter and Paul Nicholson at the World Matchplay, before losing 16–6 to Phil Taylor in the quarter-finals, but then suffered first round exits in the World Grand Prix, European Championship and the Masters and could not qualify for the Grand Slam for the first time in five years. His season did finish on a positive note at the Players Championship Finals when he knocked out Justin Pipe 6–1, Brendan Dolan and Terry Jenkins both 10–5, before succumbing to an 11–6 defeat against Adrian Lewis in the semi-finals.

=== 2015 ===
Newton lost the first two sets against qualifier Cristo Reyes in the opening round of the 2015 World Championship, but rallied to level at 2–2. The deciding set went to a sudden-death leg which Reyes won to produce a result referred to as one of the biggest upsets in the tournament's history. However, there was controversy after the final leg had to be restarted due to confusion over whether the players had to throw for the bull beforehand or go straight in. Both players were visibly irritated by the mistake and Newton posted a series of angry Twitter messages after the match, although he accepted that Reyes deserved to win. Newton dropped to world number 16 after the event and didn't get a wildcard for the Premier League which meant he missed out of the event for the first time since 2012. After failing to get beyond the last 16 in any event he was ranked 22nd in the world in July to miss out on qualification for the World Matchplay for the first time since 2008. In fact he could not reach the remaining major events of 2015 after being a firm fixture in them during the previous five years. He had not reached the quarter-final stage of any PDC tournament in over a year.

=== 2016 ===
In a rematch from last year, Newton drew Cristo Reyes in the first round of the 2016 World Championship and won the first set despite averaging just 67.31. In the fourth set Newton finished 341 in six darts to break through and went on to wrap up a 3–1 victory with an average of 77.80. In the second round he could not win a leg against James Wade until the third set in a 4–0 defeat. He qualified for the UK Open, but lost 6–4 to Rob Cross in the second round.

In July, Newton revealed his dip in form coincided with a shoulder injury, but stated that it had felt better in the last few months. He also said his confidence and form could not get any worse. Newton fell outside the top 32 in the world rankings during 2016 and, after the UK Open, failed to qualify for any of the major events. He only reached the last 16 of two Pro Tour events throughout the year. Newton stated that if he could not qualify for the 2017 World Championship it would be a disaster after he had played in the previous 12, but he failed to do so after losing 5–2 to Barrie Bates in the second round of the qualifier. He was the world number 59 after the event.

=== 2017–2019: Loss of Tour Card and move to the BDO ===
Newton's decline continued during 2017. Although he won the inaugural Neon Newport Masters in August, he failed to retain his PDC Tour Card at the end of the season. He entered Q-School in January 2018 in an attempt to regain it, but was unsuccessful. He subsequently competed on the PDC Challenge Tour and in British Darts Organisation (BDO) events.

In October 2018, Newton reached the last 48 of the World Masters. He also qualified for the 2019 BDO World Darts Championship, his first appearance at the BDO World Championship, but was beaten 3–1 by Paul Hogan in the preliminary round.

Newton made another unsuccessful attempt to regain his Tour Card at the 2019 Q-School. However, he qualified as an amateur for the 2019 UK Open, where he lost 6–4 to Cameron Menzies in the first round. Later that year, he reached a semi-final on the Challenge Tour and competed in the 2019 BDO World Trophy, losing 5–1 to Jim Williams in the opening round.

=== 2020–present: WDF and independent circuit ===
Newton continued to play in events outside the PDC professional circuit. In May 2022, he reached the final of the Welsh Open, where he lost 6–2 to Luke Littler.

In an August 2024 interview, Newton explained that a shoulder injury sustained during his second Premier League Darts campaign had affected him for approximately two years and altered his throwing technique, contributing to his loss of form. By then, he had returned to working as a quality-control engineer and was playing mainly in local competitions, alongside occasional WDF and MODUS Super Series appearances. He said he was enjoying darts again and did not rule out a return to the PDC.

In August 2025, Newton reiterated his ambition to make another attempt at the professional circuit, although he said he had not entered Q-School for several years because he wanted to improve his level of play first. In December, he competed at the Amateur Darts Circuit (ADC) Global Championship, advancing from the first group stage before being eliminated in the second.

== Personal life ==
Newton currently resides in Fleetwood, and uses the nickname The Warrior for his matches. His younger brother Dale Newton is a former professional player and they both played in the 2006 World Championship. Newton's dad Colin is a high-level amateur player. With his close family all playing darts, he actually attributes his career to his cousin Leon, exclaiming "he used to visit every summer when we were little and teach me how to play, stand and throw correctly even though he was 5 years younger than me. I owe it all to him".

Newton and his partner Stacey have two children, Fraser Wesley and Zac. In the early part of his career he juggled playing darts with his job as an accounts clerk until he turned professional in 2009.

He is a supporter of Fleetwood Town and Liverpool.

== World Championship performances ==
=== PDC ===
- 2005: Second round (lost to Gerry Convery 0–3)
- 2006: Second round (lost to Kevin Painter 3–4)
- 2007: Second round (lost to Colin Osborne 2–4)
- 2008: First round (lost to Jamie Caven 0–3)
- 2009: Second round (lost to Raymond van Barneveld 1–4)
- 2010: Second round (lost to Adrian Lewis 2–4)
- 2011: Quarter-finals (lost to Terry Jenkins 4–5)
- 2012: Second round (lost to Justin Pipe 3–4)
- 2013: Quarter-finals (lost to James Wade 4–5)
- 2014: Quarter-finals (lost to Peter Wright 4–5)
- 2015: First round (lost to Cristo Reyes 2–3)
- 2016: Second round (lost to James Wade 0–4)

=== BDO ===
- 2019: Preliminary round (lost to Paul Hogan 1–3)

== Career finals ==
=== PDC major finals: 2 (2 runners-up) ===
Legend
UK Open (0–1)
European Championship (0–1)

Outcome	No.	Year	Championship	Opponent in the final	Score (Note: (l) = score in legs, (s) = score in sets.)
Runner-up	1.	2011	UK Open	James Wade	8–11 (l)
Runner-up	2.	2012	European Championship	Simon Whitlock	5–11 (l)

=== PDC European tour finals: (1 title) ===
Legend
Other (1–0)

Outcome	No.	Year	Championship	Opponent in the final	Score
Winner	1.	2013	European Darts Trophy	Paul Nicholson	6–5 (l)

== Performance timeline ==
=== PDC ===
Tournament	2003	2004	2005	2006	2007	2008	2009	2010	2011		2012	2013	2014	2015	2016	2017	2018	2019
PDC Ranked televised events
World Championship	DNQ		2R	2R	2R	1R	2R	2R	QF		2R	QF	QF	1R	2R	DNQ		
UK Open	4R	2R	3R	4R	5R	5R	5R	QF	F		QF	4R	DNP	4R	2R	DNQ		1R
World Matchplay	DNP			1R	1R	DNQ	1R	1R	QF		2R	1R	QF	Did not qualify				
World Grand Prix	DNQ		2R	1R	1R	DNQ	2R	2R	2R		SF	2R	1R	Did not qualify				
European Championship	Not held					DNQ	1R	2R	2R		F	1R	1R	Did not qualify				
Grand Slam of Darts	Not held				DNQ	RR	DNQ	RR	2R		2R	RR	Did not qualify					
Players Championship Finals	Not held						DNQ	QF	QF	SF	1R	QF	SF	Did not qualify				
Las Vegas Desert Classic	DNP	1R	SF	SF	2R	DNP	2R	Not held										
PDC Non-ranked televised events
Premier League	NH		Did not participate									9th	9th	Did not participate				
The Masters	Not held											QF	1R	1R	Did not qualify			
Championship League	Not held					RR	DNQ	RR	RR		RR	SF	Not held					
US Open	Not held				4R	4R	SF	4R	Not held									
Career statistics
Year-end ranking	–	–	–	24	25	35	25	12	6		7	8	16	29	59	100	–	–

=== BDO ===
Tournament	2018	2019
BDO Ranked televised events
World Championship	DNQ	PR
World Masters	L48	L64
World Trophy	DNQ	1R

==== PDC European Tour ====
Season	1	2	3	4	5	6	7	8	9	10
2012	ADO; QF	GDC; SF	EDO; 2R	GDM; 3R	DDM; 2R					
2013	UKM; 2R	EDT; W	EDO; 2R	ADO; 3R	GDT; 1R	GDC; 2R	GDM; 3R	DDM; QF		
2014	GDC; 3R	DDM; QF	GDM; 3R	ADO; QF	GDT; 2R	EDO; 3R	DNQ	EDT; 3R		
2015	DNQ	GDT; 1R	GDM; 3R	DDM; 1R	DNQ	EDO; 2R	EDT; 2R	EDM; 1R	DNQ	
2016	Did not qualify				ADO; 1R	EDO; 3R	Did not qualify			

==== PDC Players Championships ====
Season	1	2	3	4	5	6	7	8	9	10	11	12	13	14	15	16	17	18	19	20	21	22	23	24	25	26	27	28	29	30	31	32	33	34	35	36	37
2003	BLA; 1R																																				
2004	BLA; 1R	NEW; 2R	DNP	ROT; 2R	DNP																																
2005	IOW; QF	IOW; 4R	BLA; 3R	DNP	DUB; 2R	IRV; 3R	LIS; 2R	LIS; 4R																													
2006	GIB; 1R	HAY; 4R	HAY; 3R	BLA; 4R	NEW; 4R	DUB; 1R	IRV; 2R	LIS; 4R	LIS; 2R																												
2007	GIB; 2R	GIB; 4R	BAD; 4R	TEM; 2R	SCH; 2R	HEE; 3R	HAY; F	HAY; 3R	LVE; 3R	BLA; 2R	ATL; 3R	CAS; 3R	CHI; 3R	NEW; 2R	DUB; 1R	IRV; 1R	KIR; 2R	KIL; 1R	LIS; 3R	LIS; 1R																	
2008	GIB; 3R	GIB; 3R	BRE; 2R	WIG; 1R	BAD; 4R	BAD; 3R	TEL; 3R	DNP	GLA; 2R	SCH; 2R	BRI; 3R	BRI; 3R	LVE; 2R	BLA; 3R	DNP	KIT; 3R	ATL; 4R	VEL; 2R	VEL; 2R	DRO; 3R	CHI; QF	NEW; 2R	NEW; 3R	DUB; 3R	DUB; 2R	IRV; 1R	IRV; 2R	DIN; 4R	KIL; 4R	LEI; 4R	LEI; 4R						
2009	DON; 1R	GIB; 3R	GIB; QF	GLA; 4R	GLA; 3R	IRV; 3R	WIG; 3R	BRE; 3R	COV; 1R	NUL; 2R	NUL; 2R	TAU; 2R	DER; 4R	NEW; 2R	BAR; 2R	BAR; 2R	DIN; 3R	DIN; 2R	LVE; 3R	DNP	ONT; F	ATL; 2R	SAL; 3R	SAL; QF	DUB; QF	DUB; F	KIL; QF	NUL; F	NUL; 2R	IRV; W	IRV; 3R						
2010	GIB; 4R	GIB; QF	SWI; 3R	DER; 3R	GLA; 4R	GLA; 3R	WIG; QF	CRA; 1R	BAR; 4R	DER; 3R	WIG; W	WIG; 3R	SAL; 3R	SAL; QF	BAR; 4R	BAR; 4R	HAA; 3R	HAA; 1R	LVE; 3R	LVE; 2R	LVE; QF	DNP	ONT; SF	ONT; SF	CRA; 4R	CRA; 2R	NUL; SF	NUL; 3R	DUB; 4R	DUB; 3R	KIL; 4R	BAD; 4R	BAD; 4R	BAR; W	BAR; W	DER; 3R	DER; QF
2011	HAL; 3R	HAL; 2R	DER; SF	DER; SF	CRA; QF	CRA; W	VIE; 2R	VIE; 3R	CRA; QF	CRA; SF	DNP		NUL; F	NUL; 4R	ONT; F	ONT; 3R	DER; 4R	DER; QF	NUL; 4R	NUL; 3R	DUB; 3R	DUB; SF	KIL; 1R	GLA; 3R	GLA; 2R	ALI; 3R	ALI; F	CRA; QF	CRA; 3R	WIG; 4R	WIG; SF						
2012	ALI; QF	ALI; 3R	REA; F	REA; 4R	CRA; 2R	CRA; 3R	BIR; SF	BIR; SF	CRA; 2R	CRA; 2R	BAR; 4R	BAR; 3R	DUB; 2R	DUB; SF	KIL; 3R	KIL; 3R	CRA; 2R	CRA; 2R	BAR; 3R	BAR; 4R																	
2013	DNP			WIG; 4R	CRA; F	CRA; QF	BAR; 1R	BAR; 3R	DUB; 4R	DUB; 3R	KIL; 4R	KIL; QF	DNP		BAR; 1R	BAR; 4R																					
2014	BAR; 4R	BAR; 3R	CRA; 1R	CRA; 1R	WIG; 2R	WIG; 4R	WIG; 1R	WIG; 3R	CRA; 2R	CRA; 3R	COV; 1R	COV; 1R	CRA; 1R	CRA; 1R	DUB; 2R	DUB; 1R	CRA; 3R	CRA; 1R	COV; 2R	COV; 4R																	
2015	BAR; 1R	BAR; 1R	BAR; 1R	BAR; 1R	BAR; 1R	COV; 1R	COV; 1R	COV; 1R	CRA; 1R	CRA; 1R	BAR; 1R	BAR; 2R	WIG; 1R	WIG; 1R	BAR; 3R	BAR; 1R	DUB; 1R	DUB; 1R	COV; 2R	COV; 1R																	
2016	BAR; 1R	BAR; 4R	BAR; 1R	BAR; 1R	BAR; 1R	BAR; 3R	BAR; 1R	COV; 1R	COV; 1R	BAR; 1R	BAR; 2R	BAR; 2R	BAR; 2R	BAR; 1R	BAR; 3R	BAR; 2R	DUB; 1R	DUB; 2R	BAR; 1R	BAR; 1R																	
2017	BAR; 2R	BAR; 1R	BAR; 1R	BAR; 2R	MIL; 2R	MIL; 2R	BAR; 1R	BAR; 1R	WIG; 1R	WIG; 1R	MIL; 1R	MIL; 2R	WIG; 3R	WIG; 1R	BAR; 1R	BAR; 3R	BAR; 1R	BAR; 1R	DUB; 2R	DUB; 1R	BAR; 1R	BAR; 3R															

==== PDC Challenge Tour ====
Season	1	2	3	4	5	6	7	8	9	10	11	12	13	14	15	16	17	18	19	20	21	22	23	24	Prize money	Ranking
2018	WIG; L256	WIG; L256	WIG; L256	WIG; L256	MIL; L256	MIL; L16	MIL; L64	MIL; L256	WIG; L64	WIG; L128	WIG; L256	WIG; L32	Did not participate				PET; L32	PET; L32	PET; L64	PET; L32					£750	67th
2019	WIG; L256	WIG; L64	WIG; L32	WIG; L256	WIG; L32	WIG; L256	WIG; L256	WIG; L128	PET; L32	PET; L64	PET; L256	PET; L256	WOL; L128	WOL; L128	WOL; SF	WOL; L64	WIG; L16	WIG; L32	WIG; L256	WIG; L32					£1,350	37th
2020	WIG; L256	WIG; L64	WIG; L64	WIG; L128	BAR; L32	BAR; L64	BAR; L128	BAR; L128	BAR; L16	BAR; L256															£450	59th
2021 UK	MIL; L256	MIL; L128	MIL; L128	MIL; L32	MIL; L256	MIL; L64	MIL; L64	MIL; L64	MIL; L128	MIL; L32	MIL; L256	MIL; L16													£550	65th
2022	MIL; L32	MIL; L256	MIL; L128	MIL; L128	MIL; L128	HIL; L256	HIL; L128	HIL; L128	HIL; L64	HIL; L128	Did not participate														£150	209th
2023	MIL; L128	MIL; L512	MIL; L256	MIL; L512	MIL; L256	Did not participate				MIL; L256	MIL; L256	MIL; L256	MIL; L256	MIL; L256	Did not participate										£0	NC

Key

Performance Table Legend
W	Won the tournament	F	Finalist	SF	Semifinalist	QF	Quarterfinalist	#R; RR; L#	Lost in # round Round-robin; Last # stage	DQ	Disqualified
DNQ	Did not qualify	DNP	Did not participate	WD	Withdrew	NH	Tournament not held	#R; RR; L#	Lost in # round Round-robin; Last # stage	NYF	Not yet founded

== Nine-dart finishes ==
Wes Newton televised nine-dart finishes
Date	Opponent	Tournament	Method	Prize
26 July 2012	(England) Justin Pipe	World Matchplay	3 x T20; 2 x T20, T19; 2 x T20, D12	£2,500
