= Arron Monk =

English darts player (born 1990)

Personal information
- Nickname: "Mad Monk”
- Born: 15 April 1990 (age 36) Andover, Hampshire, England

Sport
- Sport: Darts
- Playing since: 1995
- Darts: 22g Red Dragon
- Laterality: Right-handed
- Walk-on music: "(Theme From) The Monkees" by The Monkees

Organisation (see split in darts)
- BDO: 2006
- PDC: 2007–present (Tour Card: 2011–2015, 2018–2019, 2023–2024)
- WDF: 2006, 2021–2022
- Current world ranking: (PDC) NR (18 October 2026)

PDC premier events – best performances
- World Championship: Last 64: 2012, 2013, 2014
- UK Open: Last 32: 2012
- Grand Slam: Last 16: 2012
- PC Finals: Last 64: 2019

Other tournament wins
- Years
British Internationals	2022
Youth events
PDC World Youth Championship	2011
PDC Development Tour	2012 (x6)
Colin Monk Classic	2011
Eastbourne Open	2010
Hampshire Open	2010
Mill Rythe Darts Festival	2009
New Kids on the Oche	2008

Other achievements
- First Youth World Darts Champion 2011

Arron Monk (born 15 April 1990) is an English professional darts player who competes in Professional Darts Corporation (PDC) events. He is the son of fellow former professional darts player and the 1996 Winmau World Masters winner Colin Monk.

== Career ==
Monk came to prominence with a group of young darts players at the 2010 UK Open which included Joe Cullen, William O'Connor and Reece Robinson. He defeated Nick Fullwell in the second round, whilst being cheered on by his father. In the third round, however he was defeated by the in-form Denis Ovens, who went on to reach the semi-final.

Monk also competed on the PDC Pro Tour and won the New Kids on the Oche event – Nuts TV's last televised darts tournament – in 2008.

On 3 January 2011, he won the final of the PDC Under-21 World Championship against Michael van Gerwen, played before the final of the 2011 PDC World Darts Championship. As a result of reaching the final, he qualified for the 2011 Grand Slam of Darts.

=== 2012 season ===
Monk qualified for his first PDC World Championship in 2012 by beating Joe Cullen in the PDPA Qualifier. He was perhaps unlucky with the draw for the first round as he played the winner of the previous weeks Players Championship Finals, Kevin Painter, and was beaten 3–1. In April, he earned a place in the Austrian Darts Open in Vienna by defeating Paul Barham and Daniel Day in the UK qualifier. He played Raymond van Barneveld in the first round and lost 6–4. At the UK Open Monk enjoyed a 9–8 victory over Painter, before losing to Paul Nicholson 9–3 in the last 32. He also qualified for the third European Darts Open with wins over Jack Hill and Chris Mason, but lost to Steve Brown 6–2 in the first round in Düsseldorf. In October, Monk reached the semi-finals of a PDC event for the first time at the 13th Players Championship of the year. He defeated the likes of Dennis Priestley, Roland Scholten and Mark Webster, all of whom have won major titles in the past, before losing 6–1 to Michael van Gerwen. Monk then saw off John Part, Vincent van der Voort and Andy Hamilton, to make the quarter finals of the firth European Tour Event of the year, the Dutch Darts Masters. Monk faced Paul Nicholson and lost 6–1 with an average of just 69.39. Monk qualified for the 2012 Grand Slam of Darts by finishing top of the PDC Unicorn Youth Tour Order of Merit. He won two of his three group games to finish second in the table and qualify for the last 16 of a major tournament for the first time. He played Dean Winstanley and was beaten 10–5.

=== 2013 season ===
Monk reached his second World Championship by finishing 35th on the 2012 ProTour Order of Merit, claiming the fifth of sixteen spots that were awarded to non-qualified players. He lost 3–0 to Peter Wright in the first round. Monk was ranked world number 45 after the event. At the UK Masters he defeated Ian White and Mark Walsh both 6–4, before missing one match dart in the third round against Robert Thornton to lose 6–5. He was beaten 6–4 by Ricky Evans in the semi-finals of the Under-21 World Championship, and lost 5–2 to Gaz Cousins in the second round of the UK Open. In total he reached the last 16 stage four times during the year but could not advance beyond this stage.

=== 2014 season ===
Monk was beaten 3–0 by Justin Pipe in the first round of the 2014 World Championship as he lost each set by three legs to one with an average of just 78.64. He lost 5–4 to Karl Merchant in the second round of the UK Open. Monk had a disappointing year as he couldn't get beyond the last 32 of any event. The only European Tour event he could qualify for was the Austrian Darts Open and he was beaten 6–1 by Stephen Bunting in the first round.

=== 2015 season ===
Monk received a ban from the DRA for reckless throwing of darts and did not play in an event until September 2015 and only won two matches in the nine tournaments he entered. He dropped to 145 in the world at the end of the year and could not win his place back on tour via Q School.

=== 2016 season ===
Monk qualified for the 2016 UK Open and defeated Stewart Rattray 6−3 and Robert Thornton 6−4, before losing 9−5 to Phil Taylor in round three. He was knocked out in the semi-finals of the 13th Challenge Tour event by Michael Barnard, but went one better later in the day at the 14th event by reaching the final where he lost 5−1 to Richie Burnett.

== World Championship results ==
=== PDC ===
- 2012: First round (lost to Kevin Painter 1–3)
- 2013: First round (lost to Peter Wright 0–3)
- 2014: First round (lost to Justin Pipe 0–3)
- 2020: First round (lost to José Justicia 0–3)

== Performance timeline ==
Tournament	2010	2011	2012	2013	2014	2015	2016	2017	2018	2019	2020	2021	2022	2023	2024
PDC Ranked televised events
World Championship	DNQ		1R	1R	1R	DNQ					1R	DNQ			
UK Open	3R	2R	4R	2R	2R	DNQ	3R	DNQ		4R	DNQ			2R	2R
Grand Slam	RR	RR	2R	Did not qualify											
Players Championship Finals	Did not qualify									1R	Did not qualify				
PDC Non-ranked events
World Youth Championship	NH	W	1R	SF	Did not participate										
Career statistics
Year-end ranking	81	75	53	39	48	93	130	-	113	72	-	-	-	113	

=== PDC European Tour ===
Season	1	2	3	4	5	6	7	8	9	10	11	12	13
2012	ADO; 1R	GDC; DNQ	EDO; 1R	GDM; 2R	DDM; QF								
2013	UKM; 3R	EDT; 2R	EDO; 2R	ADO; 1R	GDT; 1R	GDC; 2R	GDM; 1R	DDM; 1R					
2014	DNQ			ADO; 1R	Did not qualify								
2018	Did not qualify				EDG; 2R	Did not qualify					DDC; 2R	IDO; DNQ	EDT; DNQ
2019	EDO; DNQ	GDC; DNQ	GDG; 1R	Did not qualify								IDO; 1R	GDT; DNQ
2023	BSD; 2R	Did not qualify				DDC; 1R	Did not qualify						GDC; 2R
2024	Did not qualify				ADO; 1R	Did not qualify							

=== PDC Players Championships ===
Season	1	2	3	4	5	6	7	8	9	10	11	12	13	14	15	16	17	18	19	20	21	22	23	24	25	26	27	28	29	30	31	32	33	34
2018	BAR; 3R	BAR; 1R	BAR; 1R	BAR; 1R	MIL; 1R	MIL; 1R	BAR; 3R	BAR; 1R	WIG; 1R	WIG; 1R	MIL; 1R	MIL; 3R	WIG; 1R	WIG; 1R	BAR; 1R	BAR; 1R	BAR; 1R	BAR; 2R	DUB; 2R	DUB; 2R	BAR; 1R	BAR; 1R												
2019	WIG; 3R	WIG; 1R	WIG; 1R	WIG; 2R	BAR; 2R	BAR; 2R	WIG; 3R	WIG; 3R	BAR; 4R	BAR; QF	BAR; 3R	BAR; 1R	BAR; 3R	BAR; SF	BAR; 2R	BAR; 1R	WIG; 1R	WIG; 1R	BAR; 1R	BAR; 1R	HIL; 1R	HIL; 4R	BAR; 1R	BAR; 1R	BAR; 2R	BAR; 1R	DUB; 1R	DUB; 2R	BAR; 2R	BAR; QF				
2023	BAR; 1R	BAR; 2R	BAR; 1R	BAR; 1R	BAR; 1R	BAR; 3R	HIL; 1R	HIL; 1R	WIG; 1R	WIG; 2R	LEI; 2R	LEI; 1R	HIL; 1R	HIL; 1R	LEI; 2R	LEI; 2R	HIL; 1R	HIL; 2R	BAR; 4R	BAR; 1R	BAR; 1R	BAR; 1R	BAR; 2R	BAR; 4R	BAR; 1R	BAR; 2R	BAR; 1R	BAR; 2R	BAR; 1R	BAR; 2R				
2024	WIG; 1R	WIG; 4R	LEI; 3R	LEI; 1R	HIL; 1R	HIL; 2R	LEI; 3R	LEI; 2R	HIL; 1R	HIL; 1R	HIL; 1R	HIL; 1R	MIL; 2R	MIL; 1R	MIL; 1R	MIL; 2R	MIL; 3R	MIL; 1R	MIL; 1R	WIG; DNP	WIG; 1R	LEI; DNP	LEI; 1R	WIG; 2R	WIG; 1R	WIG; 1R	WIG; 1R	WIG; 1R	LEI; 1R	LEI; QF				
2026	Did not participate				LEI; 1R	LEI; 1R	Did not participate																				LEI	LEI	ROS	ROS	ROS	ROS	LEI	LEI

Performance Table Legend
W	Won the tournament	F	Finalist	SF	Semifinalist	QF	Quarterfinalist	#R; RR; Prel.	Lost in # round Round-robin; Preliminary round	DQ	Disqualified
DNQ	Did not qualify	DNP	Did not participate	WD	Withdrew	NH	Tournament not held	#R; RR; Prel.	Lost in # round Round-robin; Preliminary round	NYF	Not yet founded
