= 2011 Players Championship Finals (December) =

2011 Cash Converters Players Championship Finals

Tournament information
- Dates: 8–11 December 2011
- Venue: Doncaster Dome
- Location: Doncaster, England
- Organisation(s): Professional Darts Corporation (PDC)
- Format: Legs
- Prize fund: £250,000
- Winner's share: £60,000
- High checkout: 170; Wes Newton (×2); Colin Lloyd; Mervyn King; Scott Rand; Co Stompé

Champion(s)
- Kevin Painter (ENG)

The December 2011 Cash Converters Players Championship Finals was the fourth edition of the PDC tournament, the Players Championship Finals, which saw the top 32 players from the 2011 PDC Players Championship Order of Merit taking part. The tournament took place between 8–11 December 2011 and was held at the Doncaster Dome, Doncaster, England. This was also the first Players Championship Final to be held before the PDC World Championship.

Phil Taylor was the defending champion, but he was defeated in the second round by Mervyn King. Kevin Painter came through the field with increasingly impressive performances to secure his first televised major title, defeating Mark Webster 13–9 in the final.

== Prize money ==
Position (no. of players)		Prize money (Total: £250,000)
Winner	(1)	£60,000
Runner-Up	(1)	£24,000
Semi-finalists	(2)	£15,000
Quarter-finalists	(4)	£10,000
Last 16 (second round)	(8)	£6,000
Last 32 (first round)	(16)	£3,000

== Qualification ==
The top 32 players from the PDC Players Championship Order of Merit after the last Players Championship events, which was held in Wigan on 27 November, qualified for the event.

A notable absentee was world champion Adrian Lewis. Simon Whitlock withdrew from the tournament due to a broken ankle, and he was replaced by John Henderson.

1. (England) Justin Pipe (second round)
2. (Scotland) Gary Anderson (second round)
3. (Australia) Paul Nicholson (first round)
4. (England) Wes Newton (semi-finals)
5. (Canada) John Part (first round)
6. (England) Ronnie Baxter (first round)
7. (England) Phil Taylor (second round)
8. (Netherlands) Vincent van der Voort (first round)
9. (England) Dave Chisnall (quarter-finals)
10. (England) Mervyn King (quarter-finals)
11. (England) Jamie Caven (first round)
12. (England) Mark Walsh (quarter-finals)
13. (Scotland) Peter Wright (second round)
14. (England) James Wade (quarter-finals)
15. (England) Colin Osborne (first round)
16. (Wales) Mark Webster (runner-up)
17. (England) Steve Beaton (first round)
18. (England) Kevin Painter (champion)
19. (England) Andy Smith (first round)
20. (England) Denis Ovens (first round)
21. (England) Mark Hylton (first round)
22. (England) Scott Rand (semi-finals)
23. (England) Colin Lloyd (first round)
24. (England) Alan Tabern (first round)
25. (Netherlands) Co Stompé (second round)
26. (England) Terry Jenkins (first round)
27. (Netherlands) Raymond van Barneveld (second round)
28. (England) Wayne Jones (second round)
29. (Wales) Richie Burnett (first round)
30. (England) Steve Brown (second round)
31. (Netherlands) Michael van Gerwen (first round)
32. (Scotland) John Henderson (first round)

== Draw ==
First round (best of 11 legs); 8–9 December
1	(England) Justin Pipe 94.35	6
32	(Scotland) John Henderson 72.74	1
16	(Wales) Mark Webster 90.84	6
17	(England) Steve Beaton 89.68	2
8	(Netherlands) Vincent van der Voort 86.89	1
25	(Netherlands) Co Stompé 95.19	6
9	(England) Dave Chisnall 96.68	6
24	(England) Alan Tabern 90.77	3
5	(Canada) John Part 87.52	0
28	(England) Wayne Jones 99.10	6
12	(England) Mark Walsh 93.40	6
21	(England) Mark Hylton 89.40	3
4	(England) Wes Newton 99.78	6
29	(Wales) Richie Burnett 92.59	3
13	(Scotland) Peter Wright 103.26	6
20	(England) Denis Ovens 96.56	4
2	(Scotland) Gary Anderson 106.09	6
31	(Netherlands) Michael van Gerwen 97.12	0
15	(England) Colin Osborne 85.56	2
18	(England) Kevin Painter 90.23	6
7	(England) Phil Taylor 97.59	6
26	(England) Terry Jenkins 100.64	4
10	(England) Mervyn King 97.61	6
23	(England) Colin Lloyd 93.42	4
6	(England) Ronnie Baxter 92.18	3
27	(Netherlands) Raymond van Barneveld 104.81	6
11	(England) Jamie Caven 95.26	2
22	(England) Scott Rand 99.00	6
3	(Australia) Paul Nicholson 95.21	5
30	(England) Steve Brown 94.93	6
14	(England) James Wade 92.43	6
19	(England) Andy Smith 94.28	4

Second round (best of 15 legs); 10 December
1	(England) Justin Pipe 92.15	7
16	(Wales) Mark Webster 93.28	8
25	(Netherlands) Co Stompé 90.10	2
9	(England) Dave Chisnall 93.61	8
28	(England) Wayne Jones 83.32	3
12	(England) Mark Walsh 91.39	8
4	(England) Wes Newton 97.91	8
13	(Scotland) Peter Wright 99.82	6
2	(Scotland) Gary Anderson 86.50	4
18	(England) Kevin Painter 91.56	8
7	(England) Phil Taylor 94.93	5
10	(England) Mervyn King 95.23	8
27	(Netherlands) Raymond van Barneveld 95.67	6
22	(England) Scott Rand 98.85	8
30	(England) Steve Brown 87.47	6
14	(England) James Wade 88.37	8

Quarter-finals (best of 17 legs); 11 December
16	(Wales) Mark Webster 92.27	9
9	(England) Dave Chisnall 90.37	8
12	(England) Mark Walsh 91.22	5
4	(England) Wes Newton 91.18	9
18	(England) Kevin Painter 91.02	9
10	(England) Mervyn King 87.42	7
22	(England) Scott Rand 99.12	9
14	(England) James Wade 94.77	5

Semi-finals (best of 19 legs); 11 December
16	(Wales) Mark Webster 93.58	10
4	(England) Wes Newton 95.54	7
18	(England) Kevin Painter 97.85	10
22	(England) Scott Rand 95.06	9

Final (best of 25 legs); 11 December
16	(Wales) Mark Webster 93.31	9
18	(England) Kevin Painter 96.28	13

== Statistics ==
Player	Eliminated	Played	Legs Won	Legs Lost	LWAT	100+	140+	180s	High checkout	3-dart average
(England) Kevin Painter	Winner	5	46	31	16	105	48	16	130	93.39
(Wales) Mark Webster	Runner-up	5	42	37	17	104	54	14	100	92.66
(England) Scott Rand	Semi-finals	4	32	23	8	77	35	13	170	98.01
(England) Wes Newton	Semi-finals	4	30	24	12	56	34	18	170	96.10
(England) Mark Walsh	Quarter-finals	3	19	15	5	36	30	9	121	92.00
(England) James Wade	Quarter-finals	3	19	19	6	55	26	6	142	91.86
(England) Dave Chisnall	Quarter-finals	3	22	14	12	31	25	11	108	93.55
(England) Mervyn King	Quarter-finals	3	21	18	9	50	31	10	170	93.42
(Scotland) Peter Wright	Second round	2	12	12	4	36	15	9	130	101.54
(Netherlands) Raymond van Barneveld	Second round	2	12	11	2	22	15	15	112	100.24
(Scotland) Gary Anderson	Second round	2	10	8	4	27	13	4	161	96.30
(England) Phil Taylor	Second round	2	11	12	4	29	10	6	83	96.26
(England) Justin Pipe	Second round	2	13	9	5	30	14	4	136	93.25
(England) Wayne Jones	Second round	2	9	8	3	28	9	4	121	91.21
(England) Steve Brown	Second round	2	12	13	4	25	21	4	92	91.20
(Netherlands) Co Stompé	Second round	2	8	9	4	24	12	3	170	92.65
(England) Alan Tabern	First round	1	3	6	1	13	2	3	62	90.77
(England) Colin Lloyd	First round	1	4	6	2	17	6	0	170	93.42
(England) Steve Beaton	First round	1	2	6	1	11	6	2	40	89.68
(England) Mark Hylton	First round	1	3	6	1	9	5	4	46	89.40
(Canada) John Part	First round	1	0	6	0	9	0	1	0	87.52
(Netherlands) Vincent van der Voort	First round	1	1	6	0	7	5	0	8	86.89
(England) Colin Osborne	First round	1	2	6	0	10	4	0	20	86.56
(England) Terry Jenkins	First round	1	4	6	2	7	8	6	89	100.64
(Netherlands) Michael van Gerwen	First round	1	0	6	0	8	3	2	0	97.12
(England) Denis Ovens	First round	1	4	6	1	19	5	2	120	96.56
(Wales) Richie Burnett	First round	1	3	6	2	18	7	0	101	92.59
(England) Ronnie Baxter	First round	1	3	6	1	14	4	2	32	92.18
(England) Jamie Caven	First round	1	2	6	0	10	6	1	44	95.26
(Australia) Paul Nicholson	First round	1	5	6	1	12	9	4	101	95.21
(England) Andy Smith	First round	1	4	6	1	10	11	2	43	94.28
(Scotland) John Henderson	First round	1	1	6	0	5	4	0	10	72.74

== Television coverage ==
The tournament was broadcast in the UK on ITV4 who return to televising the tournament after the last edition was streamed through the PDC website. The tournament was also broadcast in Australia for the first time with Fox Sports showing it. In the Netherlands, the tournament was broadcast on TV (highlights) and internet (livestream) by RTL7.
