= James Hubbard (darts player) =

English darts player (born 1992)

Personal information
- Born: 24 July 1992 (age 34) Norwich, England
- Home town: Wymondham, England

Sport
- Sport: Darts
- Darts: 22g Harrows
- Laterality: Right-handed
- Walk-on music: "Good Feeling" by Flo Rida

Organisation (see split in darts)
- PDC: 2011–2018

WDF major events – best performances
- World Masters: Last 72: 2011

PDC premier events – best performances
- World Championship: Last 64: 2013
- World Matchplay: Last 32: 2012
- UK Open: Last 64: 2012, 2014
- Grand Slam: Group stage: 2011, 2012

Other tournament wins
- Years
Norfolk Open	2011
PDC Under 21 World Ch'ship	2012
PDC Youth Tour England	2012, 2012, 2014

James Hubbard (born 24 July 1992) is an English former professional darts player.

== Career ==
Hubbard reached the final of the 2012 PDC World Youth Championship. He beat Michael van Gerwen in the final at the O2 Arena in London on 17 May 2012. As a result of reaching the final, he received a PDC Pro Tour card for 2012. Hubbard's title also earned him an invitation to the 2011 Grand Slam of Darts. He lost against Phil Taylor, Mervyn King and Steve Beaton in the group stage.

In May, Hubbard earned a place in the 2012 German Darts Championship by defeating Andrew Gilding and Kevin Dowling in the UK qualifier. In the first round of the event in Berlin he pulled off the best result of his career to date by knocking out reigning two-time world champion Adrian Lewis 6–4. He continued his run by defeating Peter Wright in round two, before losing to his practice partner Mervyn King 6–4 in the last 16.

Hubbard also qualified for the third European Tour event, the 2012 European Darts Open in Düsseldorf. He beat Andy Hamilton in the first round, and Steve Brown in the second. After defeating Mark Walsh 6–3 in the last 16, a result which secured his qualification for the 2012 World Matchplay, Hubbard shed tears of joy on the stage. He then lost to Richie Burnett 6–2 in the quarter-finals. Hubbard played Wes Newton in the first round of the World Matchplay and was beaten 10–5. In October, he saw off Denis Ovens 6–2 in the opening round of the 2012 Dutch Darts Masters, before losing 6–4 to Andy Jenkins. Hubbard qualified for the Grand Slam of Darts again thanks to his 2011 World Youth Championship title, but lost all of three Group C games against Simon Whitlock, Dean Winstanley and Kevin Painter to finish bottom of the table.

Hubbard qualified for the 2013 World Championship, his first, by finishing 34th on the 2012 ProTour Order of Merit, claiming the fourth of sixteen spots that were available to non-qualified players. He lost the opening six legs of his first round match against Richie Burnett to be two sets down, but with the crowd heavily favouring Hubbard, Burnett's form dropped substantially and Hubbard was able to level the match at 2–2. However, the Welshman's experience eventually told as he took the deciding set by four legs to two. Hubbard was ranked world number 52 after the event. He lost 5–3 to Andy Smith in the second round of the UK Open. He had a disappointing year overall as he could not win beyond the last 32 of any ranking tournament.

Hubbard advanced to the third round of the UK Open for the second time of his career in 2014, but was thrashed 9–1 by world number one Michael van Gerwen. At the fifth Players Championship, Hubbard enjoyed notable 6–0 and 6–4 victories over Wes Newton and Van Gerwen in reaching his first semi-final on the PDC tour, which he lost 6–1 to Brendan Dolan. Hubbard won the eighth Youth Tour event of the year by beating Reece Robinson 4–2 in the final.

Hubbard was ranked world number 74 at the start of 2015, meaning he had to enter Q School in order to win his place back on tour. However, he was unable to progress past the last 64 on any of the four days to fall short of earning a new tour card. Hubbard failed to qualify for the UK Open, but played in all 32 of the Challenge and Development Tour tournaments, reaching one quarter-final in the final Development Tour event where he was knocked out 4–3 by Josh Payne. The only European Tour event he reached was the European Darts Trophy, where he lost 6–1 to Rowby-John Rodriguez in the first round.

In 2016, Hubbard played in all 19 of the Development Tour events, recording two quarter-final and two semi-final finishes. He qualified for the European Darts Grand Prix but could only average 75.22 during a 6–2 first round loss to Max Hopp.

== Practice ==
Hubbard practices and travels with the 2004 World Masters champion Mervyn King, who has tipped Hubbard as a player to watch in years to come. These sentiments were echoed by Simon Whitlock who practiced with Hubbard before the 2012 Grand Slam of Darts.

== World Championship results ==
=== PDC ===
- 2013: First round (lost to Richie Burnett 2–3)

== Personal life ==
Hubbard is the son of former PDC professional player Vic Hubbard. When not playing darts, Hubbard works as a decorator with his father and as a tipster for BettingLounge.co.uk.
