= Tomas Seyler =

German darts player (1974–2024)

Personal information
- Nickname: "Shorty"
- Born: 16 July 1974 Bremerhaven, Bremen, West Germany
- Died: 11 July 2024 (aged 49) Hanover, Germany

Sport
- Sport: Darts
- Playing since: 1990
- Darts: 21g Datadart
- Laterality: Right-handed
- Walk-on music: "Whatever You Want" by Status Quo

Organisation (see split in darts)
- BDO: 1993–2005
- PDC: 2005–2019

WDF major events – best performances
- World Masters: Last 16: 2003
- World Trophy: Quarter Final: 2004
- Int. Darts League: Last 32 Group: 2004

PDC premier events – best performances
- World Championship: Last 32: 2006
- UK Open: Last 128: 2013
- European Championship: Last 32: 2010, 2012, 2013

Other tournament wins
- Years
| German Gold Cup | 2005, 2012 |
| PDC World Germany Qualifying Event | 2009 |

Tomas Seyler (16 July 1974 – 11 July 2024), nicknamed Shorty, was a German professional darts player.

== Career ==
Seyler reached the second round of the Winmau World Masters in 2003, beating Vincent van der Voort in the first round, but lost to Raymond van Barneveld. He also reached the Quarter-Finals of the World Darts Trophy in 2004, beating Bob Taylor and Tony West before losing to Martin Adams. He won the German Gold Cup in 2005.

Seyler made his PDC debut at the 2006 PDC World Darts Championship, where he beat crowd favourite Jamie Harvey of Scotland in the first round but lost to the Netherlands' Roland Scholten in round two. He returned to Purfleet for the 2007 PDC World Darts Championship but the German number one lost in the first round to World number one Colin Lloyd.

He also frequently appeared on German television channel Sport1 and streaming service DAZN as co-commentator on PDC darts tournaments.

== Death ==
Seyler died on 11 July 2024 at the age of 49.

== World Championship results ==
=== PDC ===
- 2006: 2nd round (lost to Roland Scholten 2–4)
- 2007: 1st round (lost to Colin Lloyd 0–3)
- 2010: Last 72 (lost to Jan van der Rassel 1–4 in legs)
- 2014: 1st round (lost to Kevin Painter 0–3)
