= Peter Hudson (darts player) =

English darts player (born 1984)

Personal information
- Nickname: "Rock"
- Born: 20 April 1984 (age 42) Manchester, England
- Home town: Eccles, Greater Manchester, England

Sport
- Sport: Darts
- Playing since: 2004
- Darts: 24g
- Laterality: Right-handed

Organisation (see split in darts)
- PDC: 2010–

PDC premier events – best performances
- World Championship: Last 64: 2013
- UK Open: Last 64: 2011, 2012, 2014, 2019, 2021
- PC Finals: Last 64: 2017

Other tournament wins
- Years
PDC Challenge Tour England	2015

Peter Hudson (born 20 April 1984) is an English darts player. He joined the Professional Darts Corporation (PDC) in 2010 but failed to qualify for any of the television majors. Hudson earned a full PDC Pro Tour card for the 2011 and 2012 seasons via the PDC's Qualifying School.

== Career ==
In 2011, Hudson qualified for the 2011 UK Open. He made an appearance on the TV stage, coming back from 3–0 down to defeat Magnus Caris 4–3 in the last 96 stage, winning the decider with a ten-dart leg. However, he then lost to Peter Wright in the last 64 in an untelevised match. Also in 2011, Hudson came within one leg of qualifying for the PDC Grand Slam of Darts. He defeated Nathan Davies, Barrie Webb, Kevin McDine, Keegan Brown and Mark Jones before losing his final qualifying match 4–3 against Ian White.

Hudson's best result in 2012 was at the seventh Players Championship of the year, where he beat the likes of Mervyn King and Robert Thornton, before losing to Ronnie Baxter 6–1 in the quarter-finals. Hudson beat Jamie Lewis to reach the last 64 of the UK Open for the second successive year. There he played Kim Huybrechts and lost 9–4. He qualified for three of the five new European Tour events, losing in the first round in two of them. In the other, the German Darts Masters he saw off Alan Tabern 6–4, before being defeated by reigning world champion Adrian Lewis 6–1 in the second round.

It was these results which largely contributed to Hudson qualifying for the World Championship by finishing 44th on the 2012 ProTour Order of Merit, claiming the 13th of 16 spots that were awarded to non-qualified players. In his first appearance at the World Championship he lost to James Wade 3–0 in sets in the first round, as he took just two legs during the match. Hudson was ranked world number 55 after the event. At the 2013 UK Open, Hudson lost 5–4 to Mark Lawrence in the second round. He qualified for three European Tour events during the year but lost in the first round on each occasion. His best results came in the second half of the season in the eighth and fifteenth Players Championship where he lost in the last 16 6–1 to Paul Nicholson and 6–3 to Michael Smith respectively.

Hudson advanced to the third round of the UK Open for the third time in 2014, but narrowly lost 9–8 against Ian White. At the penultimate Players Championship of 2014 he saw off Dan Russell, Peter Wright, Benito van de Pas and Kim Huybrechts to make the quarter-finals of a PDC event for the first time, which he lost 6–4 to White. He finished 2014 outside of the top 64 on the Order of Merit and did not enter Q School.

Hudson qualified for the 2015 UK Open by winning the Riley's Sheffield qualifier, but lost 5–4 to Rob Smith in the first round. He claimed the first title of his career at the 14th Challenge Tour event by beating Ryan Palmer 5–4.

At the second UK Open Qualifier of 2016, Hudson advanced to his second ever PDC quarter-final and lost 6–3 to Phil Taylor. He was knocked out 6–4 in the second round of the UK Open by Dirk van Duijvenbode. Six wins saw him reach the final of the fourth Challenge Tour event, where he lost 5–4 to Bryan de Hoog. A second last 16 appearance in a main tour event this year came at the 11th Players Championship and he was beaten 6–2 by Robbie Green.

At the first UK Open Qualifier of 2017, Hudson defeated Benito van de Pas 6–4 to reach his first semi-final in a PDC event where he was whitewashed 6–0 by Peter Wright.

== World Championship results ==
=== PDC ===
- 2013: First round (lost to James Wade 0–3)
- 2022: First round (lost to Ritchie Edhouse 2–3)

== Performance timeline ==
PDC

Tournament	2010	2011	2012	2013	2014	2015	2016	2017	2018	2019	2020	2021	2022
PDC World Championship	DNQ			1R	DNQ								1R
UK Open	1R	3R	3R	2R	3R	1R	2R	2R	DNQ	4R	DNQ	4R	2R
Players Championship Finals	DNQ							1R	DNQ				
Career statistics
Year-end ranking	115	77	56	55	72	-	86	64	91	95	-	108	
