= Steve West (darts player) =

English darts player

Personal information
- Nickname: "Simply"
- Born: 5 June 1975 (age 51) Epping, Essex, England
- Home town: Harlow, England

Sport
- Sport: Darts
- Playing since: 1989
- Darts: 22g Cosmo Steve West
- Laterality: Right-handed
- Walk-on music: "Don't Stop Believin'" by Journey

Organisation (see split in darts)
- BDO: 2005–2012
- PDC: 2012–2022, 2025 (Tour Card: 2012-2022)

WDF major events – best performances
- World Championship: Last 32: 2008, 2009, 2010, 2011, 2012
- World Masters: Quarter-final: 2008, 2009
- World Trophy: Last 40: 2007
- Int. Darts League: Preliminary Round: 2007
- Finder Masters: Quarter-final: 2007, 2009

PDC premier events – best performances
- World Championship: Last 16: 2018
- World Matchplay: Last 16: 2017
- World Grand Prix: Last 16: 2016, 2017
- UK Open: Quarter-final: 2018
- Grand Slam: Group Stage: 2015
- European Championship: Quarter-final: 2018, 2020
- PC Finals: Last 32: 2017

Other tournament wins
- Years
Denmark Open	2007, 2011
Finnish Open	2008
German Gold Cup	2008

Other achievements
- Kennemerland Open 2011; Open Noord West Nederland 2008; Open Smitshoek 2010

Steve West (born 5 June 1975) is an English darts player. He is the younger brother of 2003 World Master Tony West.

== BDO career ==
West showed signs of a promising career quickly by reaching the final of the 2005 French Open, losing to local Dominique le Roy. He also reached the last 32 of the 2005 World Masters where he lost to Gary Anderson. In 2007, West reached another Open final in the 2007 Dutch Open, one of the BDO's biggest Open tournaments. Amongst his scalps were Dutchmen Co Stompé and Edwin Max before losing in the final to Scott Waites. Following this and three further quarter-finals, he qualified for the 2007 International Darts League, but was knocked out at the Preliminary Group Stage.

West then won his first Open title, winning the 2007 Denmark Open, beating the Netherlands' Niels de Ruiter in the semi-finals and then beat fellow Englishman James Wilson in the final. His performances earned him qualification for the 2008 BDO World Championship. He faced former World Champion Ted Hankey in the first round and lost 3–2 despite leading 2–1. West bounced back from his Lakeside defeat to win the 2008 German Gold Cup beating Andree Welge in the final. He then won the Finnish Open, beating local favourite and former Masters finalist Jarkko Komula in the semi-finals and then beat Norway's Robert Wagner in the final. He also made two semi-final showings in the Belgium Open and the French Open and reached the quarter-finals of the Northern Ireland Open. These performances helped West qualify automatically for the 2009 BDO World Championship at the Lakeside, where he was the number 13 seed. However, he was outclassed by Alan Norris 3–0 in the first round. West could not better this in 2010 either, as once again he relinquished a 2–1 lead this time to Irish débutante Martin McCloskey. In 2011, West once more lost in the first round to 2010 finalist Dave Chisnall after missing three darts at double top to win before Chisnall came back to force a tiebreak in the final set and eventually win. In 2012, West lost in the first round of the BDO World Championship for the fifth year in a row against former runner-up and world #1 Tony O'Shea. This levelled him with Davy Richardson and Tony Payne for the record of most first-round losses at the World Championship before finally winning.

It was announced at the end of the 2012 BDO World Championship that Steve would be one of many players to compete in the rival PDC's 'Q School' the following season, including his brother Tony.

== PDC career ==
Steve won a PDC tour card in the second day of 2012 qualifiers, defeating Gino Vos in the last round a day after Tony had earned his card. However, he did not play the full schedule of PDC ProTour events due to major hip surgery and could not advance beyond the last 64 in any of the ones he did play. He returned in 2013 to play in each of the eight UK Open Qualifiers where his best result came in event five, losing in the last 16 to Jelle Klaasen. West was placed 44th on the UK Open Order of Merit to enter the event in the second round, where he beat Jake Pennington 5–3. Further wins followed over Ian White and Richie Burnett to set up a fifth round meeting against Peter Wright, which he lost 9–4. The furthest he advanced during the rest of the season came in two Players Championships where he lost in the last 32 to Paul Nicholson and Wright both by 6–4 scorelines.

West's two-year PDC tour card expired after the 2014 World Championship and he finished outside the top 64 on the Order of Merit so therefore entered Q School in January 2014 to retain his place. He was successful on the final day by defeating Mareno Michels 5–3 in his last match, revealing afterwards that he has changed his throwing action due to a hip replacement and bone graft he received in late 2012. He qualified for the UK Open where he lost 5–4 against Tony Randall in the second round. West played in two European Tour events during the campaign, the German Darts Masters and European Darts Trophy, and was defeated by Dave Chisnall and Simon Whitlock both in the second round.

West began 2015 just outside the top 64 in the world rankings as he was number 66 and so once again entered Q School. On the third day he came through the event for the third time by beating Tim Martin 5–2 in the final round to earn a fresh two-year tour card. He was eliminated in the last 16 stage of four Players Championships during the year and lost 6–5 to Terry Jenkins in the second round of the European Darts Trophy after leading 4–1. West made his debut in the Grand Slam of Darts this year after overcoming Dean Winstanley, Wes Newton, Robert Owen and Eddie Dootson in the qualifying event. He finished third in his group after losing 5–2 and 5–3 to Kim Huybrechts and Michael van Gerwen and recording a 5–0 whitewash over Mark Oosterhuis.

In 2016 West's best results came in the second half of the year. Wins over Mike Zuydwijk, William O'Connor, Jeffrey de Zwaan, Simon Whitlock, Cristo Reyes and Ricky Evans at the 16th Players Championship event saw him play in his first PDC final. West was 4–2 down to Michael van Gerwen, but took out a 116 finish to lead 5–4. He threw for the title in a deciding leg and was unable to take out 110 as Van Gerwen won it 6–5. A semi-final followed in the 18th event after beating Adrian Lewis 6–3 and he lost 6–1 to Whitlock. The result qualified him for the World Grand Prix and he pulled off what he called the biggest moment of his darting life by knocking out 11-time winner of the event Phil Taylor 2–1. He lost 3–0 to Daryl Gurney in the second round with each set going to a deciding leg. He met his brother Tony in the first round of the German Darts Championship and averaged 109.98 in a 6–0 whitewash. West went on to see off Stephen Bunting 6–2 and Kim Huybrechts 6–5, before being defeated 6–2 by Alan Norris in the quarter-finals. He qualified for his first European Championship and lost the first five legs against Jelle Klaasen in the opening round and went on to be eliminated 6–3.

On his PDC World Championship debut, West won the opening two sets and was on 36 for the match in the third, when Mervyn King took out 136, went on to win the set and level at 2–2. In the decider, West missed two match darts and was knocked out 3–2.

After a solid 2017 in which West reached a Pro Tour final (losing to Michael van Gerwen in a deciding leg) and won several matches in televised majors, West finally picked up his first ever victory at either version of the world championship at the seventh time of asking, by defeating Benito van de Pas 3–1 in the first round. He followed this with a win over another Dutchman, Jermaine Wattimena, 4–1 after surviving several darts to go 1–0 down. He was defeated by two-time champion Gary Anderson 4–2 in the last 16. West lost his tour card following the 2023 World Championship.

== World Championship results ==
=== BDO ===
- 2008: First round (lost to Ted Hankey 2–3)
- 2009: First round (lost to Alan Norris 0–3)
- 2010: First round (lost to Martin McCloskey 2–3)
- 2011: First round (lost to Dave Chisnall 2–3)
- 2012: First round (lost to Tony O'Shea 0–3)

=== PDC ===
- 2017: First round (lost to Mervyn King 2–3)
- 2018: Third round (lost to Gary Anderson 2–4)
- 2019: Third round (lost to Devon Petersen 2–4)
- 2020: Second round (lost to Ryan Searle 0–3)
- 2021: Second round (lost to Peter Wright 1–3)

== Performance timeline ==
BDO

Tournament	2005	2006	2007	2008	2009	2010	2011	2012
BDO World Championship	DNQ			1R	1R	1R	1R	1R
World Masters	3R	DNQ	4R	QF	QF	6R	2R	DNP
Zuiderduin Masters	DNP	NH	QF	RR	QF	RR	DNP	

PDC

Tournament	2012	2013	2014	2015	2016	2017	2018	2019	2020	2021	2022
PDC World Championship	DNQ					1R	3R	3R	2R	2R	DNQ
UK Open	DNQ	5R	2R	1R	DNQ		QF	5R	5R	3R	3R
World Matchplay	DNQ					2R	1R	DNQ			
World Grand Prix	DNQ				2R	2R	1R	DNQ			
European Championship	DNQ				1R	DNQ	QF	DNQ	QF	DNQ	
Grand Slam	DNQ			RR	DNQ						
Players Championship Finals	DNQ				1R	2R	1R	1R	DNQ		
Career statistics
Year-end ranking (PDC)	148	77	66	66	45	37	22	32	45	54	97

PDC European Tour

Season	1	2	3	4	5	6	7	8	9	10	11	12	13
2013	UKM; 1R	EDT; DNQ	EDO; DNQ	ADO; 2R	DNQ								
2014	GDC; DNQ	DDM; DNQ	GDM; 2R	DNQ				EDT; 2R					
2015	GDC; DNQ	GDT; 1R	DNQ				EDT; 2R	EDM; DNQ	EDG; DNQ				
2016	DDM; DNQ	GDM; DNQ	GDT; 2R	EDM; DNQ	ADO; 2R	EDO; 2R	IDO; 2R	EDT; 1R	EDG; DNQ	GDC; DNQ			
2017	GDC; DNQ	GDM; 2R	GDO; 2R	EDG; 3R	GDT; DNQ	EDM; DNQ	ADO; 2R	EDO; DNQ	DDM; 2R	GDG; DNQ	IDO; DNQ	EDT; 2R	
2018	EDO; DNQ	GDG; 3R	GDO; 2R	ADO; 2R	EDG; DNQ	DDM; DNQ	GDT; SF	DDO; SF	EDM; DNQ	GDC; DNQ	DDC; 2R	IDO; SF	EDT; 1R
2019	DNQ			GDO; 1R	DNQ			DDO; 1R	CDO; 1R	ADC; DNQ	EDM; DNQ	IDO; 3R	GDT; 1R
2020	BDC; 3R	GDC; 1R	EDG; DNQ	IDO; 2R									
2022	Did not participate/qualify											BDO; 1R	GDT; DNQ

PDC Players Championships

Season	1	2	3	4	5	6	7	8	9	10	11	12	13	14	15	16	17	18	19	20	21	22	23	24	25	26	27	28	29	30
2012	ALI; DNP		REA; 2R	REA; 2R	CRA; 1R	CRA; 1R	Did not participate																							
2013	WIG; 2R	WIG; 1R	WIG; 2R	WIG; 2R	CRA; 2R	CRA; 2R	BAR; 3R	BAR; 1R	DUB; 2R	DUB; 1R	KIL; 1R	KIL; 1R	WIG; 2R	WIG; 1R	BAR; 3R	BAR; 2R														
2014	BAR; 1R	BAR; 2R	CRA; 1R	CRA; 1R	WIG; 1R	WIG; 1R	WIG; 1R	WIG; 2R	CRA; 1R	CRA; 1R	COV; 1R	COV; 1R	CRA; 1R	CRA; 2R	DUB; 2R	DUB; 2R	CRA; 3R	CRA; 2R	COV; 1R	COV; 2R										
2015	BAR; 2R	BAR; 1R	BAR; 4R	BAR; 1R	BAR; 1R	COV; 1R	COV; 1R	COV; 3R	CRA; 2R	CRA; DNP	BAR; 1R	BAR; 2R	WIG; 2R	WIG; 1R	BAR; 2R	BAR; 4R	DUB; 4R	DUB; 1R	COV; 4R	COV; 3R										
2016	BAR; 1R	BAR; 4R	BAR; 2R	BAR; 1R	BAR; 1R	BAR; 2R	BAR; 2R	COV; 4R	COV; 3R	BAR; 1R	BAR; 2R	BAR; 4R	BAR; 4R	BAR; 1R	BAR; 3R	BAR; F	DUB; 3R	DUB; SF	BAR; 3R	BAR; 4R										
2017	BAR; QF	BAR; 3R	BAR; SF	BAR; 4R	MIL; 1R	MIL; 3R	BAR; 4R	BAR; 2R	WIG; 2R	WIG; SF	MIL; 1R	MIL; 1R	WIG; 1R	WIG; 1R	BAR; 2R	BAR; 1R	BAR; 2R	BAR; 4R	DUB; 1R	DUB; 3R	BAR; 3R	BAR; 2R								
2018	BAR; 1R	BAR; QF	BAR; 1R	BAR; 1R	MIL; 3R	MIL; 3R	BAR; 1R	BAR; 3R	WIG; 4R	WIG; 4R	MIL; 1R	MIL; 1R	WIG; 3R	WIG; 2R	BAR; 2R	BAR; 2R	BAR; 2R	BAR; 1R	DUB; QF	DUB; 4R	BAR; 1R	BAR; 1R								
2019	WIG; 1R	WIG; 4R	WIG; QF	WIG; 2R	BAR; 1R	BAR; 1R	WIG; 1R	WIG; 2R	BAR; SF	BAR; 1R	BAR; SF	BAR; 1R	BAR; 1R	BAR; 1R	BAR; 2R	BAR; 1R	WIG; 1R	WIG; 1R	BAR; 2R	BAR; 3R	HIL; 2R	HIL; 1R	BAR; 2R	BAR; 1R	BAR; 3R	BAR; SF	DUB; 3R	DUB; 1R	BAR; 2R	BAR; 3R
2020	BAR; 1R	BAR; 3R	WIG; 3R	WIG; 1R	WIG; 1R	WIG; 1R	BAR; 1R	BAR; 2R	MIL; 2R	MIL; 1R	MIL; 1R	MIL; 1R	MIL; 1R	NIE; 2R	NIE; 1R	NIE; 1R	NIE; 1R	NIE; 2R	COV; 1R	COV; 2R	COV; 1R	COV; 3R	COV; 1R							
2021	BOL; 1R	BOL; 1R	BOL; 1R	BOL; 1R	MIL; 1R	MIL; 1R	MIL; 2R	MIL; 4R	NIE; DNP				MIL; 1R	MIL; 3R	MIL; 1R	MIL; 1R	COV; 1R	COV; 1R	COV; 1R	COV; 1R	BAR; 2R	BAR; 3R	BAR; 1R	BAR; 1R	BAR; 1R	BAR; 3R	BAR; 1R	BAR; 2R	BAR; 2R	BAR; 2R
2022	BAR; 1R	BAR; 2R	WIG; 4R	WIG; 1R	BAR; 1R	BAR; 2R	NIE; 2R	NIE; 2R	BAR; 1R	BAR; 1R	BAR; 1R	BAR; 2R	BAR; 1R	WIG; 2R	WIG; 4R	NIE; 1R	NIE; 1R	BAR; 3R	BAR; 3R	BAR; 1R	BAR; 1R	BAR; 1R	BAR; 1R	BAR; 3R	BAR; 3R	BAR; 1R	BAR; 1R	BAR; 1R	BAR; 1R	BAR; 1R

PDC Challenge Tour

Season	1	2	3	4	5	6	7	8	9	10	11	12	13	14	15	16	17	18	19	20	21	22	23	24	Prize money	Ranking
2025	MIL; L64	MIL; L128	MIL; L256	MIL; L256	MIL; L16	HIL; DNP					MIL; L128	MIL; L128	MIL; L256	MIL; L32	MIL; QF	LEI; L64	LEI; L128	LEI; L256	LEI; L32	LEI; L32	WIG; L32	WIG; L32	WIG; L128	WIG; L128	£1825	59th

Performance Table Legend
W	Won the tournament	F	Finalist	SF	Semifinalist	QF	Quarterfinalist	#R; RR; Prel.	Lost in # round Round-robin; Preliminary round	DQ	Disqualified
DNQ	Did not qualify	DNP	Did not participate	WD	Withdrew	NH	Tournament not held	#R; RR; Prel.	Lost in # round Round-robin; Preliminary round	NYF	Not yet founded
