= 2016 European Darts Open =

Tournament information
- Dates: 29–31 July 2016
- Venue: Maritim Hotel
- Location: Düsseldorf, Germany
- Organisation(s): Professional Darts Corporation (PDC)
- Format: Legs
- Prize fund: £115,000
- Winner's share: £25,000
- High checkout: 161 Gerwyn Price

Champion(s)
- Michael van Gerwen (NED)

The 2016 European Darts Open was the sixth of ten European Tour events on the 2016 PDC Pro Tour. The tournament took place at Maritim Hotel in Düsseldorf, Germany, from 29 to 31 July 2016. It featured a field of 48 players and £115,000 in prize money, with £25,000 going to the winner.

Robert Thornton was the defending champion, but he lost in the second round to Wes Newton.

Michael van Gerwen won his second European Darts Open title after defeating Peter Wright 6–5 in the final.

== Prize money ==
The prize money of the European Tour events stays the same as last year.

Stage (num. of players)		Prize money
Winner	(1)	£25,000
Runner-up	(1)	£10,000
Semi-finalists	(2)	£5,000
Quarter-finalists	(4)	£3,500
Third round losers	(8)	£2,000
Second round losers	(16)	£1,500
First round losers	(16)	£1,000
Total	£115,000	

== Qualification and format ==
The top 16 players from the PDC ProTour Order of Merit on 13 May automatically qualified for the event and were seeded in the second round. The remaining 32 places went to players from three qualifying events - 20 from the UK Qualifier (held in Coventry on 20 May), eight from the European Qualifier on 1 June and four from the Host Nation Qualifier on 28 July.

On 27 July 2016, Phil Taylor withdrew from the tournament, moving seeds 14–16 up a place, and promoting Alan Norris to 16 seed, which also meant a 5th Host Nation Qualifier would also qualify for the tournament.

The following players will take part in the tournament:

Top 16
1. (Netherlands) Michael van Gerwen (winner)
2. (Scotland) Peter Wright (runner-up)
3. (England) Michael Smith (third round)
4. (England) Dave Chisnall (second round)
5. (Belgium) Kim Huybrechts (semi-finals)
6. (England) Ian White (third round)
7. (Netherlands) Benito van de Pas (second round)
8. (Netherlands) Jelle Klaasen (quarter-finals)
9. (England) James Wade (third round)
10. (Austria) Mensur Suljović (quarter-finals)
11. (England) Terry Jenkins (quarter-finals)
12. (Scotland) Robert Thornton (second round)
13. (Scotland) Gary Anderson (quarter-finals)
14. (England) Stephen Bunting (semi-finals)
15. (Australia) Simon Whitlock (second round)
16. (England) Alan Norris (second round)

UK Qualifier
- (Wales) Gerwyn Price (third round)
- (Northern Ireland) Daryl Gurney (third round)
- (England) Shaun Griffiths (first round)
- (England) James Richardson (second round)
- (England) Andy Jenkins (first round)
- (England) Mark Frost (first round)
- (England) Harry Ward (first round)
- (Wales) Jonny Clayton (second round)
- (England) Ritchie Edhouse (second round)
- (England) Tony Newell (first round)
- (England) Steve West (second round)
- (Australia) Kyle Anderson (third round)
- (England) Jamie Caven (second round)
- (England) Robbie Green (first round)
- (England) Andy Boulton (second round)
- (Scotland) John Henderson (first round)
- (England) Wes Newton (third round)
- (England) Andy Hamilton (first round)
- (South Africa) Devon Petersen (second round)

European Qualifier
- (Greece) John Michael (second round)
- (Spain) Cristo Reyes (first round)
- (Netherlands) Christian Kist (first round)
- (Netherlands) Jeffrey de Graaf (first round)
- (Finland) Kim Viljanen (second round)
- (Netherlands) Jan Dekker (third round)
- (Italy) Daniele Petri (first round)
- (Belgium) Dimitri Van den Bergh (second round)

Host Nation Qualifier
- (Germany) Martin Schindler (first round)
- (Germany) Stefan Stoyke (second round)
- (Germany) Holger Rettig (first round)
- (Germany) Fabian Herz (first round)
- (Germany) Max Hopp (first round)

== Draw ==
First round (best of 11 legs); 29 July
(England) Jamie Caven 89.20	6
(Netherlands) Christian Kist 83.07	3
(Australia) Kyle Anderson 92.35	6
(Spain) Cristo Reyes 88.62	5
(England) Ritchie Edhouse 87.06	6
(England) Harry Ward 81.78	4
(Germany) Max Hopp 81.62	5
(England) Andy Boulton 80.36	6
(Belgium) Dimitri Van den Bergh 93.57	6
(Netherlands) Jeffrey de Graaf 85.31	2
(England) Wes Newton 87.93	6
(England) Shaun Griffiths 83.71	5
(Scotland) John Henderson 86.47	4
(Netherlands) Jan Dekker 84.59	6
(Finland) Kim Viljanen 85.56	6
(Germany) Martin Schindler 79.83	1
(England) Steve West 89.02	6
(Germany) Holger Rettig 75.48	3
(Wales) Gerwyn Price 84.57	6
(England) Tony Newell 79.82	3
(Northern Ireland) Daryl Gurney 92.48	6
(England) Robbie Green 96.32	5
(Greece) John Michael 85.89	6
(Germany) Fabian Herz 70.41	0
(South Africa) Devon Petersen 87.12	6
(England) Andy Jenkins 85.58	5
(England) Andy Hamilton 89.89	3
(Wales) Jonny Clayton 96.53	6
(England) James Richardson 89.43	6
(Italy) Daniele Petri 83.27	3
(England) Mark Frost 76.73	4
(Germany) Stefan Stoyke 78.19	6

Second round (best of 11 legs); 30 July
1	(Netherlands) Michael van Gerwen 104.86	6
(England) Jamie Caven 87.96	0
16	(England) Alan Norris 101.25	2
(Australia) Kyle Anderson 98.84	6
8	(Netherlands) Jelle Klaasen 98.98	6
(England) Ritchie Edhouse 94.02	3
9	(England) James Wade 88.16	6
(England) Andy Boulton 89.67	5
5	(Belgium) Kim Huybrechts 98.11	6
(Belgium) Dimitri Van den Bergh 88.48	3
12	(Scotland) Robert Thornton 86.65	2
(England) Wes Newton 86.60	6
4	(England) Dave Chisnall 90.62	3
(Netherlands) Jan Dekker 86.23	6
13	(Scotland) Gary Anderson 107.11	6
(Finland) Kim Viljanen 89.72	1
2	(Scotland) Peter Wright 97.29	6
(England) Steve West 92.10	5
15	(Australia) Simon Whitlock 92.72	1
(Wales) Gerwyn Price 100.59	6
7	(Netherlands) Benito van de Pas 91.84	4
(Northern Ireland) Daryl Gurney 94.10	6
10	(Austria) Mensur Suljović 103.41	6
(Greece) John Michael 94.36	1
6	(England) Ian White 96.00	6
(South Africa) Devon Petersen 84.42	2
11	(England) Terry Jenkins 91.28	6
(Wales) Jonny Clayton 94.48	3
3	(England) Michael Smith 97.39	6
(England) James Richardson 87.95	4
14	(England) Stephen Bunting 93.74	6
(Germany) Stefan Stoyke 80.06	1

Third round (best of 11 legs); 31 July
1	(Netherlands) van Gerwen 99.38	6
(Australia) K. Anderson 91.72	2
8	(Netherlands) Klaasen 91.29	6
9	(England) Wade 96.40	3
5	(Belgium) Huybrechts 104.32	6
(England) Newton 93.89	3
(Netherlands) Dekker 94.37	0
13	(Scotland) G. Anderson 104.86	6
2	(Scotland) Wright 103.25	6
(Wales) Price 88.57	2
(Northern Ireland) Gurney 96.20	3
10	(Austria) Suljović 93.53	6
6	(England) White 97.89	5
11	(England) T. Jenkins 92.06	6
3	(England) Smith 93.61	3
14	(England) Bunting 95.98	6

Quarter-finals (best of 11 legs); 31 July
1	(Netherlands) van Gerwen 102.95	6
8	(Netherlands) Klaasen 93.33	4
5	(Belgium) Huybrechts 91.48	6
13	(Scotland) G. Anderson 85.49	4
2	(Scotland) Wright 100.20	6
10	(Austria) Suljović 94.68	0
11	(England) T. Jenkins 92.88	4
14	(England) Bunting 88.42	6

Semi-finals (best of 11 legs); 31 July
1	(Netherlands) van Gerwen 103.63	6
5	(Belgium) Huybrechts 94.85	3
2	(Scotland) Wright 100.34	6
14	(England) Bunting 93.06	4

Final (best of 11 legs); 31 July
1	(Netherlands) van Gerwen 104.06	6
2	(Scotland) Wright 100.44	5
