= 2015 Gibraltar Darts Trophy =

Tournament information
- Dates: 20–22 March 2015
- Venue: Victoria Stadium
- Location: Gibraltar
- Organisation(s): Professional Darts Corporation (PDC)
- Format: Legs
- Prize fund: £115,000
- Winner's share: £25,000
- High checkout: 170 Nathan Derry

Champion(s)
- Michael van Gerwen (NED)

The 2015 Gibraltar Darts Trophy was the second of nine PDC European Tour events on the 2015 PDC Pro Tour. The tournament took place at the Victoria Stadium, Gibraltar, from 20 to 22 March 2015. It featured a field of 48 players and £115,000 in prize money, with £25,000 going to the winner.

The defending champion was James Wade, having beaten Steve Beaton 6–4 in the previous year's final, but he was defeated in the semi-finals after losing 6–2 to Terry Jenkins, who then lost the final 6–3 to Michael van Gerwen.

== Prize money ==
The prize fund was increased to £115,000 after being £100,000 for the previous two years.

Stage (num. of players)		Prize money
Winner	(1)	£25,000
Runner-up	(1)	£10,000
Semi-finalists	(2)	£5,000
Quarter-finalists	(4)	£3,500
Third round losers	(8)	£2,000
Second round losers	(16)	£1,500
First round losers	(16)	£1,000
Total	£115,000	

== Qualification and format ==
The top 16 players from the PDC ProTour Order of Merit on the 16 January 2015 automatically qualified for the event. The remaining 32 places went to players from three qualifying events - 20 from the UK Qualifier (held in Wigan on 18 January), eight from the European Qualifier (held in Bielefeld on 24 January) and four from the Host Nation Qualifier (held at the venue the day before the event started).

The following players took part in the tournament:

Top 16
1. (Scotland) Gary Anderson (third round)
2. (Netherlands) Michael van Gerwen (winner)
3. (England) Michael Smith (second round)
4. (Scotland) Peter Wright (second round)
5. (England) James Wade (semi-finals)
6. (Scotland) Robert Thornton (second round)
7. (Northern Ireland) Brendan Dolan (second round)
8. (England) Mervyn King (quarter-finals)
9. (England) Justin Pipe (third round)
10. (England) Ian White (second round)
11. (Australia) Simon Whitlock (third round)
12. (Netherlands) Vincent van der Voort (third round)
13. (Belgium) Kim Huybrechts (quarter-finals)
14. (England) Stephen Bunting (second round)
15. (England) Steve Beaton (second round)
16. (England) Terry Jenkins (runner-up)

UK Qualifier
- (England) Kevin McDine (second round)
- (England) Andy Jenkins (first round)
- (England) Nathan Derry (third round)
- (England) Brian Woods (third round)
- (England) Wes Newton (first round)
- (England) Brett Claydon (first round)
- (England) Andrew Gilding (first round)
- (England) Kevin Painter (second round)
- (England) Joe Murnan (first round)
- (England) Andy Smith (third round)
- (Wales) Jamie Lewis (semi-finals)
- (Wales) Mark Webster (first round)
- (England) Steve West (first round)
- (Wales) Gerwyn Price (quarter-finals)
- (South Africa) Devon Petersen (second round)
- (Wales) Kurt Parry (first round)
- (Northern Ireland) Daryl Gurney (first round)
- (England) Wayne Jones (third round)
- (England) Tony Newell (second round)
- (England) Andy Parsons (first round)

European Qualifier
- (Austria) Rowby-John Rodriguez (first round)
- (Netherlands) Benito van de Pas (second round)
- (Netherlands) Dirk van Duijvenbode (first round)
- (Belgium) Ronny Huybrechts (first round)
- (Spain) Cristo Reyes (second round)
- (Belgium) Dimitri Van den Bergh (second round)
- (Netherlands) Jelle Klaasen (quarter-finals)
- (Netherlands) Mike Zuydwijk (second round)

Host Nation Qualifier
- (Gibraltar) Manuel Vilerio (first round)
- (Gibraltar) Dylan Duo (first round)
- (Gibraltar) Antony Lopez (second round)
- (Gibraltar) John Duo (first round)

== Draw ==
First round (best of 11 legs); 20 March
(South Africa) Devon Petersen 98.95	6
(Wales) Kurt Parry 92.05	2
(England) Tony Newell 90.24	6
(England) Steve West 87.65	4
(Gibraltar) Antony Lopez 81.00	6
(Gibraltar) John Duo 72.76	3
(England) Joe Murnan 83.05	5
(Netherlands) Mike Zuydwijk 84.65	6
(Wales) Mark Webster 86.21	3
(Spain) Cristo Reyes 89.98	6
(Belgium) Ronny Huybrechts 80.74	2
(England) Kevin McDine 85.88	6
(England) Andrew Gilding 92.34	5
(England) Wayne Jones 90.95	6
(Netherlands) Dirk van Duijvenbode 88.74	5
(Belgium) Dimitri Van den Bergh 88.30	6
(England) Kevin Painter 86.32	6
(Austria) Rowby-John Rodriguez 86.98	3
(England) Brian Woods 83.57	6
(Gibraltar) Manuel Vilerio 74.29	2
(Netherlands) Jelle Klaasen 96.97	6
(Northern Ireland) Daryl Gurney 92.62	0
(England) Andy Parsons 78.94	3
(England) Nathan Derry 86.60	6
(Wales) Gerwyn Price 85.46	6
(Gibraltar) Dylan Duo 70.47	2
(England) Wes Newton 93.43	0
(Netherlands) Benito van de Pas 101.33	6
(Wales) Jamie Lewis 84.49	6
(England) Brett Claydon 81.75	3
(England) Andy Smith 95.17	6
(England) Andy Jenkins 90.26	4

Second round (best of 11 legs); 21 March
1	(Scotland) Gary Anderson 105.22	6
(South Africa) Devon Petersen 92.23	2
16	(England) Terry Jenkins 98.37	6
(England) Tony Newell 89.37	2
8	(England) Mervyn King 95.94	6
(Gibraltar) Antony Lopez 69.68	0
9	(England) Justin Pipe 88.97	6
(Netherlands) Mike Zuydwijk 85.60	4
5	(England) James Wade 91.50	6
(Spain) Cristo Reyes 91.58	3
12	(Netherlands) Vincent van der Voort 92.01	6
(England) Kevin McDine 87.84	3
4	(Scotland) Peter Wright 97.93	5
(England) Wayne Jones 98.30	6
13	(Belgium) Kim Huybrechts 81.32	6
(Belgium) Dimitri Van den Bergh 84.21	5
2	(Netherlands) Michael van Gerwen 85.02	6
(England) Kevin Painter 83.16	5
15	(England) Steve Beaton 93.88	5
(England) Brian Woods 100.80	6
7	(Northern Ireland) Brendan Dolan 90.16	2
(Netherlands) Jelle Klaasen 95.29	6
10	(England) Ian White 91.79	1
(England) Nathan Derry 100.90	6
6	(Scotland) Robert Thornton 91.97	4
(Wales) Gerwyn Price 90.12	6
11	(Australia) Simon Whitlock 89.96	6
(Netherlands) Benito van de Pas 91.77	4
3	(England) Michael Smith 99.04	5
(Wales) Jamie Lewis 96.23	6
14	(England) Stephen Bunting 103.02	3
(England) Andy Smith 96.70	6

Third round (best of 11 legs); 22 March
1	(Scotland) Anderson 90.06	4
16	(England) T. Jenkins 87.95	6
8	(England) King 101.98	6
9	(England) Pipe 92.12	1
5	(England) Wade 104.68	6
12	(Netherlands) van der Voort 100.85	2
(England) Jones 98.53	4
13	(Belgium) K. Huybrechts 102.33	6
2	(Netherlands) van Gerwen 103.19	6
(England) Woods 87.90	3
(Netherlands) Klaasen 93.90	6
(England) Derry 87.40	3
(Wales) Price 94.02	6
11	(Australia) Whitlock 95.97	2
(Wales) Lewis 95.82	6
(England) A. Smith 87.88	4

Quarter-finals (best of 11 legs); 22 March
16	(England) T. Jenkins 96.05	6
8	(England) King 97.09	3
5	(England) Wade 106.54	6
13	(Belgium) K. Huybrechts 92.41	4
2	(Netherlands) van Gerwen 109.92	6
(Netherlands) Klaasen 99.62	4
(Wales) Price 91.15	5
(Wales) Lewis 89.86	6

Semi-finals (best of 11 legs); 22 March
16	(England) T. Jenkins 101.22	6
5	(England) Wade 91.85	2
2	(Netherlands) van Gerwen 104.47	6
(Wales) Lewis 96.39	1

Final (best of 11 legs); 22 March
16	(England) T. Jenkins 99.28	3
2	(Netherlands) van Gerwen 107.04	6
