= 2015 European Darts Matchplay =

Tournament information
- Dates: 18–20 September 2015
- Venue: Olympiahalle
- Location: Innsbruck, Austria
- Organisation(s): Professional Darts Corporation (PDC)
- Format: Legs
- Prize fund: £115,000
- Winner's share: £25,000
- High checkout: 170; Robert Marijanović; Justin Pipe; Ian White

Champion(s)
- Michael van Gerwen (NED)

The 2015 European Darts Matchplay was the eighth of nine PDC European Tour events on the 2015 PDC Pro Tour. The tournament took place at the Olympiahalle in Innsbruck, Austria from 18 to 20 September 2015. It featured a field of 48 players and £115,000 in prize money, with £25,000 going to the winner.

Michael van Gerwen won the tournament, defeating Dave Chisnall 6–4 in the final.

== Prize money ==
The prize fund was increased to £115,000 after being £100,000 for the previous two years.

| Stage (num. of players) | | Prize money |
|---|---|---|
| Winner | (1) | £25,000 |
| Runner-up | (1) | £10,000 |
| Semi-finalists | (2) | £5,000 |
| Quarter-finalists | (4) | £3,500 |
| Third round losers | (8) | £2,000 |
| Second round losers | (16) | £1,500 |
| First round losers | (16) | £1,000 |
| Total | £115,000 | |

== Qualification and format ==
The top 16 players from the PDC ProTour Order of Merit on 30 June 2015 automatically qualified for the event. The remaining 32 places went to players from three qualifying events - 20 from the UK Qualifier (held in Wigan on 3 July), eight from the European Qualifier (held in Mülheim on 10 September at the same time as the European Darts Trophy) and four from the Host Nation Qualifier (held at the venue the day before the event started), although following the withdrawals of Gary Anderson and Kyle Anderson, the host nation were given an extra two qualifying spots, bringing the total up to six.

The following players took part in the tournament:

Top 16
1. (Netherlands) Michael van Gerwen (winner)
2. (England) Michael Smith (second round)
3. (Scotland) Peter Wright (quarter-finals)
4. (England) Ian White (third round)
5. (Northern Ireland) Brendan Dolan (third round)
6. (England) Dave Chisnall (runner-up)
7. (England) Justin Pipe (third round)
8. (England) Mervyn King (third round)
9. (Australia) Simon Whitlock (second round)
10. (Belgium) Kim Huybrechts (quarter-finals)
11. (England) Terry Jenkins (third round)
12. (Scotland) Robert Thornton (semi-finals)
13. (Netherlands) Vincent van der Voort (quarter-finals)
14. (Netherlands) Benito van de Pas (third round)
15. (Netherlands) Jelle Klaasen (second round)
16. (England) Stephen Bunting (second round)

UK Qualifier
- (England) Alan Norris (third round)
- (England) Jamie Caven (first round)
- (Wales) Gerwyn Price (first round)
- (England) Adam Hunt (first round)
- (England) Terry Temple (first round)
- (Republic of Ireland) William O'Connor (second round)
- (England) Darren Johnson (second round)
- (England) Andy Hamilton (second round)
- (England) Joe Murnan (first round)
- (England) Paul Milford (first round)
- (England) Dean Winstanley (first round)
- (England) Mark Walsh (second round)
- (England) Kevin Painter (second round)
- (England) Darren Webster (second round)
- (Northern Ireland) Mickey Mansell (second round)
- (England) Tony Newell (second round)
- (England) Wes Newton (first round)
- (England) David Pallett (semi-finals)

European Qualifier
- (Austria) Maik Langendorf (second round)
- (Germany) Stefan Stoyke (first round)
- (Netherlands) Dirk van Duijvenbode (first round)
- (Belgium) Ronny Huybrechts (second round)
- (Belgium) Dimitri Van den Bergh (second round)
- (Netherlands) Raymond van Barneveld (third round)
- (Croatia) Robert Marijanović (second round)
- (Germany) Max Hopp (first round)

Host Nation Qualifier
- (Austria) Roxy-James Rodriguez (first round)
- (Austria) Armin Glanzer (first round)
- (Austria) Aaron Hardy (first round)
- (Austria) Mensur Suljović (first round)
- (Austria) Zoran Lerchbacher (first round)
- (Austria) Rowby-John Rodriguez (quarter-finals)

== Draw ==
First round (best of 11 legs); 18 September
(England) Wes Newton 88.59 | 5
(Belgium) Ronny Huybrechts 83.72 | 6
(Netherlands) Raymond van Barneveld 97.58 | 6
(Germany) Max Hopp 88.45 | 3
(Northern Ireland) Mickey Mansell 84.29 | 6
(England) Adam Hunt 84.18 | 3
(Austria) Rowby-John Rodriguez 92.87 | 6
(Germany) Stefan Stoyke 86.80 | 3
(England) Joe Murnan 89.36 | 5
(England) Mark Walsh 88.76 | 6
(Austria) Maik Langendorf 83.67 | 6
(Austria) Aaron Hardy 78.89 | 5
(Belgium) Dimitri Van den Bergh 84.65 | 6
(England) Paul Milford 76.83 | 2
(England) Andy Hamilton 103.66 | 6
(England) Dean Winstanley 102.59 | 3
(England) Alan Norris 82.30 | 6
(Austria) Armin Glanzer 75.98 | 2
(England) Jamie Caven 93.05 | 2
(England) David Pallett 100.73 | 6
(England) Tony Newell 89.14 | 6
(England) Terry Temple 82.16 | 3
(Austria) Mensur Suljović 90.44 | 2
(England) Darren Webster 95.92 | 6
(Wales) Gerwyn Price 85.01 | 4
(Republic of Ireland) William O'Connor 93.04 | 6
(England) Kevin Painter 88.83 | 6
(Austria) Roxy-James Rodriguez 84.59 | 3
(England) Darren Johnson 82.08 | 6
(Austria) Zoran Lerchbacher 68.30 | 1
(Netherlands) Dirk van Duijvenbode 79.22 | 5
(Croatia) Robert Marijanović 80.16 | 6

Second round (best of 11 legs); 19 September
1 | (Netherlands) Michael van Gerwen 97.53 | 6
(Belgium) Ronny Huybrechts 91.42 | 3
16 | (England) Stephen Bunting 101.78 | 2
(Netherlands) Raymond van Barneveld 105.64 | 6
8 | (England) Mervyn King 91.74 | 6
(Northern Ireland) Mickey Mansell 86.42 | 4
9 | (Australia) Simon Whitlock 87.45 | 3
(Austria) Rowby-John Rodriguez 91.09 | 6
5 | (Northern Ireland) Brendan Dolan 82.29 | 6
(England) Mark Walsh 80.86 | 5
12 | (Scotland) Robert Thornton 86.66 | 6
(Austria) Maik Langendorf 78.52 | 3
4 | (England) Ian White 94.66 | 6
(Belgium) Dimitri Van den Bergh 87.48 | 4
13 | (Netherlands) Vincent van der Voort 94.38 | 6
(England) Andy Hamilton 81.25 | 3
2 | (England) Michael Smith 97.61 | 5
(England) Alan Norris 95.52 | 6
15 | (Netherlands) Jelle Klaasen 97.80 | 3
(England) David Pallett 104.83 | 6
7 | (England) Justin Pipe 93.31 | 6
(England) Tony Newell 90.98 | 5
10 | (Belgium) Kim Huybrechts 101.62 | 6
(England) Darren Webster 95.89 | 2
6 | (England) Dave Chisnall 99.34 | 6
(Republic of Ireland) William O'Connor 92.30 | 3
11 | (England) Terry Jenkins 95.32 | 6
(England) Kevin Painter 97.78 | 5
3 | (Scotland) Peter Wright 84.86 | 6
(England) Darren Johnson 72.04 | 2
14 | (Netherlands) Benito van de Pas 94.82 | 6
(Croatia) Robert Marijanović 91.03 | 4

Third round (best of 11 legs); 20 September
1 | (Netherlands) van Gerwen 100.21 | 6
(Netherlands) van Barneveld 94.13 | 1
8 | (England) King 95.82 | 4
(Austria) Ro-Jo Rodriguez 87.43 | 6
5 | (Northern Ireland) Dolan 99.04 | 4
12 | (Scotland) Thornton 93.31 | 6
4 | (England) White 91.66 | 5
13 | (Netherlands) van der Voort 92.56 | 6
(England) Norris 91.45 | 5
(England) Pallett 89.40 | 6
7 | (England) Pipe 98.14 | 4
10 | (Belgium) K. Huybrechts 99.11 | 6
6 | (England) Chisnall 107.64 | 6
11 | (England) Jenkins 101.46 | 5
3 | (Scotland) Wright 99.38 | 6
14 | (Netherlands) van de Pas 86.32 | 3

Quarter-finals (best of 11 legs); 20 September
1 | (Netherlands) van Gerwen 114.00 | 6
(Austria) Ro-Jo Rodriguez 102.89 | 3
12 | (Scotland) Thornton 93.43 | 6
13 | (Netherlands) van der Voort 96.59 | 3
(England) Pallett 98.10 | 6
10 | (Belgium) K. Huybrechts 91.61 | 5
6 | (England) Chisnall 105.03 | 6
3 | (Scotland) Wright 98.10 | 3

Semi-finals (best of 11 legs); 20 September
1 | (Netherlands) van Gerwen 109.09 | 6
12 | (Scotland) Thornton 80.76 | 1
(England) Pallett 91.86 | 3
6 | (England) Chisnall 98.93 | 6

Final (best of 11 legs); 20 September
1 | (Netherlands) van Gerwen 99.58 | 6
6 | (England) Chisnall 95.89 | 4
