= 2017 German Darts Championship =

Tournament information
- Dates: 24–26 March 2017
- Venue: Halle 39
- Location: Hildesheim, Germany
- Organisation(s): Professional Darts Corporation (PDC)
- Format: Legs; First to 6 legs
- Prize fund: £135,000
- Winner's share: £25,000
- High checkout: 161 Benito van de Pas

Champion(s)
- Peter Wright (SCO)

The 2017 German Darts Championship was the first of twelve PDC European Tour events on the 2017 PDC Pro Tour. The tournament took place at Halle 39, Hildesheim, Germany, between 24–26 March 2017. It will feature a field of 48 players and £135,000 in prize money, with £25,000 going to the winner.

Alan Norris was the defending champion, having beaten Jelle Klaasen 6–5 in the final of the previous edition, but he was defeated 6–4 in the third round by Kim Huybrechts.

Peter Wright won the final, defeating Michael van Gerwen 6–3, winning his second PDC European Tour title.

== Prize money ==
This is how the prize money is divided:

Stage (num. of players)		Prize money
Winner	(1)	£25,000
Runner-up	(1)	£10,000
Semi-finalists	(2)	£6,000
Quarter-finalists	(4)	£4,000
Third round losers	(8)	£3,000
Second round losers	(16)	£2,000
First round losers	(16)	£1,000
Total	£135,000	

== Qualification and format ==
The top 16 players from the PDC ProTour Order of Merit on 6 March automatically qualified for the event and were seeded in the second round.

The remaining 32 places went to players from five qualifying events - 18 from the UK Qualifier (held in Barnsley on 10 March), eight from the West/South European Qualifier, four from the Host Nation Qualifier (both held on 23 March), one from the Nordic & Baltic Qualifier (held on 17 February) and one from the East European Qualifier (held on 25 February).

The following players took part in the tournament:

Top 16
1. (Netherlands) Michael van Gerwen (runner-up)
2. (Scotland) Peter Wright (champion)
3. (Austria) Mensur Suljović (quarter-finals)
4. (Netherlands) Benito van de Pas (quarter-finals)
5. (England) Dave Chisnall (third round)
6. (Australia) Simon Whitlock (second round)
7. (England) Alan Norris (third round)
8. (England) Ian White (quarter-finals)
9. (England) James Wade (second round)
10. (Belgium) Kim Huybrechts (quarter-finals)
11. (Wales) Gerwyn Price (semi-finals)
12. (Netherlands) Jelle Klaasen (semi-finals)
13. (England) Michael Smith (second round)
14. (England) Joe Cullen (third round)
15. (England) Stephen Bunting (third round)
16. (Spain) Cristo Reyes (third round)

UK Qualifier
- (England) Ryan Searle (first round)
- (Scotland) Jamie Bain (second round)
- (England) Darren Johnson (third round)
- (England) Kirk Shepherd (first round)
- (England) Chris Dobey (first round)
- (England) Stephen Burton (first round)
- (England) Mervyn King (second round)
- (Australia) Paul Nicholson (second round)
- (Brazil) Diogo Portela (second round)
- (Republic of Ireland) Mick McGowan (second round)
- (England) Ryan Meikle (first round)
- (England) Chris Quantock (first round)
- (England) Paul Harvey (second round)
- (England) John Bowles (second round)
- (England) David Pallett (second round)
- (England) Richie Corner (second round)
- (England) Kevin Painter (third round)
- (England) Adam Hunt (first round)

West/South European Qualifier
- (Netherlands) Christian Kist (second round)
- (Netherlands) Ryan de Vreede (first round)
- (Belgium) Dimitri Van den Bergh (second round)
- (Netherlands) Jermaine Wattimena (second round)
- (Greece) John Michael (first round)
- (Netherlands) Michael Plooy (first round)
- (Netherlands) Jan Dekker (third round)
- (Austria) Michael Rasztovits (first round)

Host Nation Qualifier
- (Germany) Robert Allenstein (first round)
- (Germany) Bernd Roith (first round)
- (Germany) Martin Schindler (first round)
- (Germany) Stefan Stoyke (first round)

Nordic & Baltic Qualifier
- (Finland) Veijo Viinikka (first round)

East European Qualifier
- (Poland) Krzysztof Ratajski (second round)

== Draw ==
First round (best of 11 legs); 24 March
(Netherlands) Jermaine Wattimena 102.21	6
(Germany) Bernd Roith 81.91	1
(England) Ryan Searle 88.97	2
(Australia) Paul Nicholson 90.29	6
(England) John Bowles 83.55	6
(Germany) Stefan Stoyke 79.55	2
(England) Darren Johnson 97.91	6
(Germany) Robert Allenstein 84.69	1
(Belgium) Dimitri Van den Bergh 96.39	6
(England) Adam Hunt 95.31	4
(Republic of Ireland) Mick McGowan 85.19	6
(Greece) John Michael 77.47	2
(England) Ryan Meikle 96.22	4
(England) Paul Harvey 102.78	6
(Netherlands) Jan Dekker 91.79	6
(England) Chris Quantock 93.39	5
(Netherlands) Christian Kist 82.99	6
(Netherlands) Michael Plooy 84.49	5
(England) David Pallett 99.91	6
(Finland) Veijo Viinikka 84.26	1
(England) Richie Corner 86.37	6
(England) Kirk Shepherd 88.51	2
(Germany) Martin Schindler 85.78	3
(Brazil) Diogo Portela 90.96	6
(England) Kevin Painter 85.80	6
(England) Stephen Burton 80.41	5
(Poland) Krzysztof Ratajski 96.12	6
(Netherlands) Ryan de Vreede 85.49	2
(England) Mervyn King 95.88	6
(Austria) Michael Rasztovits 89.22	5
(England) Chris Dobey 95.37	5
(Scotland) Jamie Bain 101.53	6

Second round (best of 11 legs); 25 March
1	(Netherlands) Michael van Gerwen 111.51	6
(Netherlands) Jermaine Wattimena 86.38	1
16	(Spain) Cristo Reyes 96.71	6
(Australia) Paul Nicholson 84.03	2
8	(England) Ian White 90.21	6
(England) John Bowles 88.80	5
9	(England) James Wade 98.46	5
(England) Darren Johnson 97.86	6
5	(England) Dave Chisnall 96.97	6
(Belgium) Dimitri Van den Bergh 87.90	0
12	(Netherlands) Jelle Klaasen 91.55	6
(Republic of Ireland) Mick McGowan 84.95	1
4	(Netherlands) Benito van de Pas 95.84	6
(England) Paul Harvey 81.08	4
13	(England) Michael Smith 95.94	1
(Netherlands) Jan Dekker 99.29	6
2	(Scotland) Peter Wright 95.01	6
(Netherlands) Christian Kist 93.14	5
15	(England) Stephen Bunting 88.43	6
(England) David Pallett 95.00	4
7	(England) Alan Norris 90.66	6
(England) Richie Corner 89.15	4
10	(Belgium) Kim Huybrechts 98.35	6
(Brazil) Diogo Portela 87.36	1
6	(Australia) Simon Whitlock 83.17	2
(England) Kevin Painter 88.40	6
11	(Wales) Gerwyn Price 99.06	6
(Poland) Krzysztof Ratajski 92.79	1
3	(Austria) Mensur Suljović 101.25	6
(England) Mervyn King 102.02	3
14	(England) Joe Cullen 96.62	6
(Scotland) Jamie Bain 87.03	2

Third round (best of 11 legs); 26 March
1	(Netherlands) van Gerwen 97.88	6
16	(Spain) Reyes 94.77	3
8	(England) White 104.68	6
(England) Johnson 91.04	2
5	(England) Chisnall 79.55	3
12	(Netherlands) Klaasen 82.56	6
4	(Netherlands) van de Pas 92.97	6
(Netherlands) Dekker 71.87	0
2	(Scotland) Wright 97.59	6
15	(England) Bunting 93.74	2
7	(England) Norris 89.38	4
10	(Belgium) Huybrechts 87.64	6
(England) Painter 90.63	4
11	(Wales) Price 92.90	6
3	(Austria) Suljović 94.93	6
14	(England) Cullen 94.67	2

Quarter-finals (best of 11 legs); 26 March
1	(Netherlands) van Gerwen 101.81	6
8	(England) White 92.83	3
12	(Netherlands) Klaasen 100.43	6
4	(Netherlands) van de Pas 99.21	4
2	(Scotland) Wright 89.02	6
10	(Belgium) Huybrechts 88.64	2
11	(Wales) Price 101.10	6
3	(Austria) Suljović 93.89	2

Semi-finals (best of 11 legs); 26 March
1	(Netherlands) van Gerwen 104.61	6
12	(Netherlands) Klaasen 90.84	1
2	(Scotland) Wright 92.98	6
11	(Wales) Price 96.53	5

Final (best of 11 legs); 26 March
1	(Netherlands) van Gerwen 93.29	3
2	(Scotland) Wright 95.36	6
