= 2007 Denmark Open darts =

Denmark Open

Tournament information
- Dates: 2007
- Country: Denmark
- Organisation(s): BDO, WDF, DDU
- Winner's share: 10,000 DKK

Champion(s)
- (England) Steve West

2007 Denmark Open is a darts tournament, which took place in Denmark in 2007.

== Results ==
=== Last 32 ===
Round	Player
Quarter Finals	(Scotland) Gary Anderson
Quarter Finals	(England) Paul Gibbs
Quarter Finals	(England) Gary Robson
Quarter Finals	(Denmark) Preben Krabben
Last 16	(Denmark) Per Faeligrch
Last 16	(England) Steve O'Donnell
Last 16	(Netherlands) Bas Smits
Last 16	(England) David Wilson
Last 16	(Czech Republic) David Miklas
Last 16	(Sweden) Daniel Larsson
Last 16	(Denmark) Brian Buur
Last 16	(England) Dave Jowett
Last 32	(Finland) Vesa Nuutinen
Last 32	(England) Paul Hogan
Last 32	(Sweden) Oskar Lukasiak
Last 32	(Netherlands) Joey ten Berge
Last 32	(Denmark) Søren Behrendsen
Last 32	(England) Martin Atkins
Last 32	(Netherlands) Patrick Loos
Last 32	(Denmark) Lars H. Andersen
Last 32	(Sweden) Per Ek
Last 32	(Sweden) Seved Rosen
Last 32	(Sweden) Bo Larsson
Last 32	(Denmark) Carsten Kondrup
Last 32	(Sweden) Dennis Nilsson
Last 32	(England) Stephen Bunting
Last 32	(Norway) Robert Wagner
Last 32	(Netherlands) Ad van Haaren
Preliminary round	(Northern Ireland) Roy Montgomery
Preliminary round	(Republic of Ireland) Billy Matthews

=== Semi-finals ===
Semi-finals
(England) Steve West	4
(Netherlands) Niels de Ruiter	3
(England) James Wilson	4
(Denmark) Kim Frithjof	3

Final
(England) Steve West	5
(England) James Wilson	2
