= 2017 German Darts Masters (World Series of Darts) =

Tournament information
- Dates: 20–21 October 2017
- Venue: Castello Arena
- Location: Düsseldorf
- Country: Germany
- Organisation(s): PDC
- Format: Legs
- Prize fund: £60,000
- Winner's share: £20,000
- High checkout: 158 (England) James Wade

Champion(s)
- (Scotland) Peter Wright

The 2017 German Darts Masters was the inaugural staging of the tournament by the Professional Darts Corporation, as the seventh and last entry in the 2017 World Series of Darts. The tournament featured 16 players (eight PDC players facing eight regional qualifiers) and was held at the Castello Arena in Düsseldorf, Germany between 20 and 21 October 2017.

Peter Wright won his first World Series title after defeating Phil Taylor 11–4 in the final, after surviving one match dart each in his first round and quarter-final game.

== Prize money ==
The total prize fund was £60,000.

Position (no. of players)		Prize money (Total: £60,000)
Winner	(1)	£20,000
Runner-up	(1)	£10,000
Semi-finalists	(2)	£5,000
Quarter-finalists	(4)	£2,500
First round	(8)	£1,250

== Qualifiers ==
The eight invited PDC representatives, sorted according to the World Series Order of Merit, are:

1. (Scotland) Gary Anderson (quarter-finals)
2. (Netherlands) Michael van Gerwen (quarter-finals, withdrew with injury)
3. (England) Phil Taylor (runner-up)
4. (Scotland) Peter Wright (winner)
5. (Netherlands) Raymond van Barneveld (semi-finals)
6. (England) James Wade (semi-finals)
7. (Northern Ireland) Daryl Gurney (quarter-finals)
8. (Australia) Kyle Anderson (first round)

The regional qualifiers are:

Qualification	Player
Wildcard (World number 6)	(Austria) Mensur Suljović (quarter-finals)
Wildcard (World number 42)	(Germany) Max Hopp (first round)
2017 Germany Superleague (First place)	(Germany) Maik Langendorf (first round)
2017 Germany Superleague (second place)	(Germany) Stefan Stoyke (first round)
2017 Germany Superleague (third place)	(Germany) Martin Schindler (first round)
2017 Germany Superleague (fourth place)	(Germany) Kevin Münch (first round)
2017 Germany Superleague (fifth place)	(Germany) Dragutin Horvat (first round)
2017 Germany Superleague (sixth place)	(Germany) Robert Marijanović (first round)

== Draw ==
First round (best of 11 legs); 20 October
1	(Scotland) Gary Anderson 90.51	6
(Germany) Max Hopp 81.82	3
(Netherlands) Raymond van Barneveld 90.11	6
(Germany) Stefan Stoyke 84.52	3
4	(Scotland) Peter Wright 92.75	6
(Germany) Dragutin Horvat 90.81	5
(Australia) Kyle Anderson 96.16	5
(Austria) Mensur Suljović 96.97	6
2	(Netherlands) Michael van Gerwen 96.83	6
(Germany) Martin Schindler 93.76	2
(England) James Wade 101.02	6
(Germany) Kevin Münch 89.26	2
3	(England) Phil Taylor 92.45	6
(Germany) Robert Marijanović 86.36	2
(Northern Ireland) Daryl Gurney 91.09	6
(Germany) Maik Langendorf 77.23	0

Quarter-finals (best of 19 legs); 21 October
1	(Scotland) Gary Anderson 93.52	8
(Netherlands) Raymond van Barneveld 97.48	10
4	(Scotland) Peter Wright 94.62	10
(Austria) Mensur Suljović 94.04	9
2	(Netherlands) Michael van Gerwen (Note: Van Gerwen withdrew from his quarter final match due to a foot injury.)	w/d
(England) James Wade	w/o
3	(England) Phil Taylor 100.40	10
(Northern Ireland) Daryl Gurney 97.00	7

Semi-finals (best of 21 legs); 21 October
(Netherlands) Raymond van Barneveld 94.13	9
4	(Scotland) Peter Wright 94.94	11
(England) James Wade 93.10	7
3	(England) Phil Taylor 95.97	11

Final (best of 21 legs); 21 October
4	(Scotland) Peter Wright 102.25	11
3	(England) Phil Taylor 93.93	4
