= 2014 Dutch Darts Masters =

Tournament information
- Dates: 14–16 February 2014
- Venue: NH Hotel
- Location: Veldhoven
- Country: Netherlands
- Organisation(s): PDC
- Format: Legs
- Prize fund: £100,000
- Winner's share: £20,000

Champion(s)
- (Netherlands) Michael van Gerwen

The 2014 Dutch Darts Masters was the second of eight PDC European Tour events on the 2014 PDC Pro Tour. The tournament took place at the NH Hotel in Veldhoven, Netherlands, between 14–16 February 2014. It featured a field of 48 players and £100,000 in prize money, with £20,000 going to the winner.

Michael van Gerwen won his third European Tour title by beating Mervyn King 6–4 in the final.

== Prize money ==
Stage (num. of players)		Prize money
Winner	(1)	£20,000
Runner-up	(1)	£8,000
Semi-finalists	(2)	£4,000
Quarter-finalists	(4)	£3,000
Third round losers	(8)	£2,000
Second round losers	(16)	£1,250
First round losers	(16)	£1,000
Total	£100,000	

== Qualification and format ==
The top 16 players from the PDC ProTour Order of Merit on the 17 January 2014 automatically qualified for the event. The remaining 32 places went to players from three qualifying events - 20 from the UK Qualifier (held in Wigan on 19 January), eight from the European Qualifier (held at the venue the day before the event started) and four from the Host Nation Qualifier (held at the venue on 11 February).

The following players took part in the tournament:

Top 16
1. (Netherlands) Michael van Gerwen (winner)
2. (England) Dave Chisnall (quarter-finals)
3. (Scotland) Peter Wright (second round)
4. (Northern Ireland) Brendan Dolan (semi-finals)
5. (Belgium) Kim Huybrechts (second round)
6. (England) Jamie Caven (second round)
7. (England) Steve Beaton (second round)
8. (England) Wes Newton (quarter-finals)
9. (Australia) Simon Whitlock (second round)
10. (England) Mervyn King (runner-up)
11. (England) Ian White (semi-finals)
12. (Canada) John Part (second round)
13. (Australia) Paul Nicholson (second round)
14. (Scotland) Gary Anderson (second round)
15. (England) Adrian Lewis (third round)
16. (England) Kevin Painter (third round)

UK Qualifier
- (England) Stuart Kellett (third round)
- (England) Mick Todd (first round)
- (Northern Ireland) Mickey Mansell (quarter-finals)
- (England) Michael Barnard (first round)
- (England) Andy Smith (second round)
- (Wales) Kevin Thomas (third round)
- (England) Steve Maish (second round)
- (Wales) Richie Burnett (third round)
- (England) Terry Jenkins (second round)
- (England) Wayne Jones (first round)
- (England) David Pallett (first round)
- (Wales) Jamie Lewis (second round)
- (England) Darren Webster (third round)
- (England) Joe Cullen (third round)
- (England) Terry Temple (first round)
- (Republic of Ireland) Glenn Spearing (first round)
- (England) Mark Walsh (first round)
- (England) Dean Winstanley (second round)
- (England) Josh Payne (first round)
- (England) Peter Hudson (first round)

European Qualifier
- (Germany) Jyhan Artut (first round)
- (Belgium) Dimitri Van den Bergh (second round)
- (Belgium) Ronny Huybrechts (second round)
- (Germany) Fabian Herz (first round)
- (Germany) Bernd Roith (first round)
- (Finland) Jarkko Komula (third round)
- (Austria) Mensur Suljović (first round)
- (Germany) Max Hopp (first round)

Host Nation Qualifier
- (Netherlands) Jelle Klaasen (first round)
- (Netherlands) Kevin Voornhout (first round)
- (Netherlands) Christian Kist (second round)
- (Netherlands) Vincent van der Voort (quarter-finals)

== Draw ==
First round (best of 11 legs); 14 February
(England) Steve Maish 94.26	6
(England) David Pallett 88.63	5
(Austria) Mensur Suljović 88.19	2
(Netherlands) Christian Kist 95.63	6
(England) Terry Temple 95.51	4
(England) Dean Winstanley 106.79	6
(England) Stuart Kellett 89.82	6
(Germany) Bernd Roith 79.32	2
(Germany) Max Hopp 84.56	3
(Northern Ireland) Mickey Mansell 85.57	6
(England) Peter Hudson 81.54	5
(England) Joe Cullen 83.90	6
(Netherlands) Kevin Voornhout 90.37	3
(Belgium) Ronny Huybrechts 101.84	6
(England) Mark Walsh 87.69	4
(Finland) Jarkko Komula 93.19	6
(England) Andy Smith 91.09	6
(Germany) Fabian Herz 79.42	0
(Republic of Ireland) Glenn Spearing 80.25	4
(Wales) Jamie Lewis 87.36	6
(Wales) Kevin Thomas 91.50	6
(England) Wayne Jones 84.58	1
(England) Josh Payne 87.75	2
(Belgium) Dimitri Van den Bergh 95.07	6
(England) Darren Webster 99.18	6
(England) Mick Todd 90.91	2
(England) Terry Jenkins 96.22	6
(Netherlands) Jelle Klaasen 94.69	5
(Wales) Richie Burnett 92.69	6
(Germany) Jyhan Artut 86.55	2
(England) Michael Barnard 87.00	5
(Netherlands) Vincent van der Voort 90.36	6

Second round (best of 11 legs); 15 February
1	(Netherlands) Michael van Gerwen 86.55	6
(England) Steve Maish 81.94	4
16	(England) Kevin Painter 87.87	6
(Netherlands) Christian Kist 89.03	5
8	(England) Wes Newton 87.91	6
(England) Dean Winstanley 79.97	1
9	(Australia) Simon Whitlock 86.35	3
(England) Stuart Kellett 95.12	6
5	(Belgium) Kim Huybrechts 92.17	4
(Northern Ireland) Mickey Mansell 93.61	6
12	(Canada) John Part 83.48	1
(England) Joe Cullen 100.59	6
4	(Northern Ireland) Brendan Dolan 96.55	6
(Belgium) Ronny Huybrechts 96.25	4
13	(Australia) Paul Nicholson 88.87	4
(Finland) Jarkko Komula 93.47	6
2	(England) Dave Chisnall 89.88	6
(England) Andy Smith 95.24	2
15	(England) Adrian Lewis 93.11	6
(Wales) Jamie Lewis 86.76	3
7	(England) Steve Beaton 96.35	5
(Wales) Kevin Thomas 93.38	6
10	(England) Mervyn King 103.66	6
(Belgium) Dimitri Van den Bergh 81.10	0
6	(England) Jamie Caven 92.45	5
(England) Darren Webster 92.83	6
11	(England) Ian White 91.99	6
(England) Terry Jenkins 92.82	3
3	(Scotland) Peter Wright 98.67	5
(Wales) Richie Burnett 95.00	6
14	(Scotland) Gary Anderson 95.12	5
(Netherlands) Vincent van der Voort 94.44	6

Third round (best of 11 legs); 16 February
1	(Netherlands) van Gerwen 104.89	6
16	(England) Painter 93.46	2
8	(England) Newton 103.58	6
(England) Kellett 89.56	3
(Northern Ireland) Mansell 95.52	6
(England) Cullen 96.18	4
4	(Northern Ireland) Dolan 101.69	6
(Finland) Komula 89.65	3
2	(England) Chisnall 91.51	6
15	(England) A. Lewis 93.05	2
(Wales) Thomas 88.72	4
10	(England) King 89.48	6
(England) Webster 85.35	3
11	(England) White 90.69	6
(Wales) Burnett 85.48	0
(Netherlands) van der Voort 101.33	6

Quarter-finals (best of 11 legs); 16 February
1	(Netherlands) van Gerwen 102.74	6
8	(England) Newton 96.17	3
(Northern Ireland) Mansell 83.57	3
4	(Northern Ireland) Dolan 82.46	6
2	(England) Chisnall 89.78	5
10	(England) King 94.77	6
11	(England) White 92.37	6
(Netherlands) van der Voort 89.45	4

Semi-finals (best of 11 legs); 16 February
1	(Netherlands) van Gerwen 101.94	6
4	(Northern Ireland) Dolan 94.90	4
10	(England) King 90.79	6
11	(England) White 90.26	5

Final (best of 11 legs); 16 February
1	(Netherlands) van Gerwen 108.80	6
10	(England) King 107.40	4
