= Ian White (darts player) =

English darts player (born 1970)

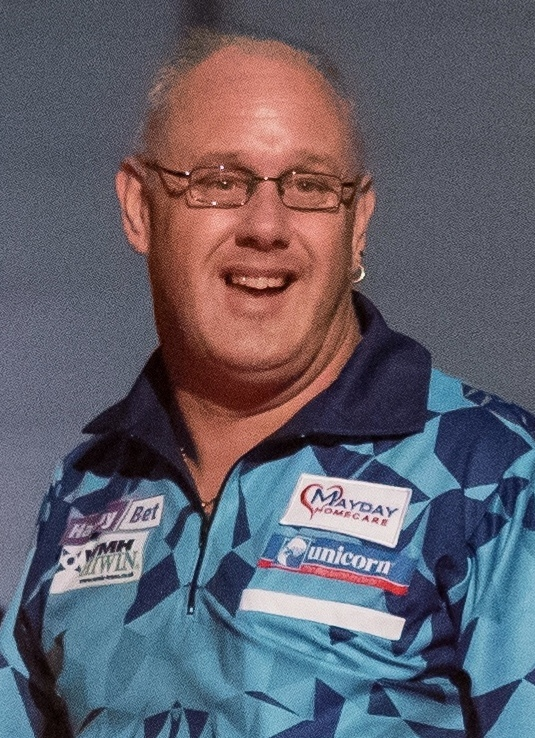
- White in 2017

Personal information
- Nickname: "Diamond"
- Born: 17 August 1970 (age 56) Runcorn, England
- Home town: Stoke-on-Trent, England

Sport
- Sport: Darts
- Playing since: 1990
- Darts: 23g Unicorn Signature
- Laterality: Right-handed
- Walk-on music: "Play That Funky Music" by Wild Cherry

Organisation (see split in darts)
- BDO: 2005–2010
- PDC: 1997, 2010–present (Tour Card: 2011–present)
- Current world ranking: (PDC) 57 (5 November 2026)

WDF major events – best performances
- World Championship: Last 32: 2010
- World Masters: Last 72: 2009
- Finder Masters: Last 24 Group: 2009

PDC premier events – best performances
- World Championship: Quarter-final: 2014
- World Matchplay: Quarter-final: 2015
- World Grand Prix: Quarter-final: 2015, 2019, 2021
- UK Open: Quarter-final: 2014, 2017
- Grand Slam: Last 16: 2019, 2020
- European Championship: Quarter-final: 2020
- PC Finals: Semi-final: 2019
- Masters: Last 16: 2015, 2016, 2017, 2018, 2019, 2020
- World Series Finals: Quarter-final: 2019

Other tournament wins
- Years
Antwerp Open	2009
Ball Green Christmas KO	2010
Chatterley Whitfield Open	2010
Denmark Open	2009
East Midlands Open	2013
England National Championships	2009
Pitgreen Lane Christmas KO	2010
Zwaantje Masters	2022, 2023
European Tour Events (x3)
Dutch Darts Championship	2018
Dutch Darts Masters	2019
European Darts Grand Prix	2019
Players Championships (x10)
2013 (x2), 2014, 2015, 2016 (x3), 2018 (x2), 2020

Ian White (born 17 August 1970), nicknamed "Diamond", is an English professional darts player who competes in Professional Darts Corporation (PDC) events. White has won thirteen PDC ranking events, including three titles on the PDC European Tour. He reached his first major semi-final at the 2019 Players Championship Finals.

== Career ==
In 1997, White reached the final of the PDC's revived News of the World Darts Championship. He defeated Des Byrne, Gary Spedding, Peter Manley and Andy Jenkins on the way to the final, where he was defeated by Phil Taylor.

White won the Antwerp Open, Denmark Open and the English National Championship in 2009. He qualified for the 2010 BDO World Darts Championship, but lost in the first round to Stephen Bunting 3–0. Shortly afterwards, he left the BDO and joined the PDC, when fellow Stoke player Adrian Lewis offered to sponsor White and suggested he was capable of being in the world's top eight. A solid first year in the PDC saw him reach the semi-finals of a Pro Tour event in Dublin, and gain an automatic Tour Card, but narrowly missed out on the 2011 PDC World Championship by £100.

In February 2011, he reached his first PDC final since 1997. He lost 6–3 to Steve Brown in the final of the 2011 UK Open Qualifier 1.

White finished third in the 2011 Grand Slam of Darts wildcard qualifier, and was awarded a place in the tournament proper after Simon Whitlock withdrew due to injury.

=== 2012 ===
He qualified for his first PDC World Championship in 2012, where he lost to Robert Thornton 3–1 in the last 64. He threw a nine-dart finish in the opening Players Championship event of the season in a first round match against Mark Hylton. White reached the semi-finals of the event, where he was beaten 6–4 by the eventual winner Justin Pipe. In April, he earned a place in the 2012 Austrian Darts Open (European Tour Event 1) in Vienna by defeating Adrian Gray in the UK qualifier. He played Colin Lloyd in the first round and lost 6–3, with his opponent achieving a three-dart average of 111. In May, he reached the final of the Players Championship 5 where he lost to Dave Chisnall 6–2. He also qualified for the third 2012 European Darts Open (ET3) with a win over John Scott, but was then beaten by Raymond van Barneveld in the first round 6–2 in Düsseldorf. By July, White had reached two semi-finals and two finals in PDC events in 2012, meaning he qualified for the World Matchplay for the first time in his career due to being the sixth highest player on the ProTour Order of Merit who was not in the world's top 16. He played Vincent van der Voort in the first round and took out 164 and 161 finishes in a 10–5 victory to set up a last 16 match-up with Phil Taylor, which he lost 13–3.

White threw his second nine-darter of the season in the fourth European Tour event, the 2012 German Darts Masters in a last 16 win against Andy Hamilton. He continued his momentum with a quarter-final deciding leg victory over Robert Thornton and a 6–4 semi-final win against Raymond van Barneveld. In the final he faced two-time reigning world champion and occasional practice partner Adrian Lewis, and was beaten 6–3. White's exceptional form carried on at his next event, the 11th Players Championship, as he beat the likes of Simon Whitlock and Terry Jenkins to reach the final. He played Michael van Gerwen and lost in a final for the fourth time this year following a 1–6 defeat. At the European Championship he exacted his revenge over Lewis with a sensational 6–0 whitewash in the first round. However, he lost to Kim Huybrechts 10–5 in his following match. At the World Grand Prix in October, White took out finishes of 144, 132 and 112 to beat van Barneveld 2–0 in sets and then faced Wes Newton in the last 16, where he was beaten 3–1. White came agonisingly close to winning his first PDC title in November, as he held a 4–0 lead over Michael van Gerwen in the final of the 18th Players Championship event, but went on to lose 6–5. After all 33 ProTour events of 2012 had been played, White finished eighth on the Order of Merit to qualify for the Players Championship Finals for the first time. He was beaten by Michael Smith 6–5 in the first round.

=== 2013 ===
White was just outside the top 32 ranked players who qualified automatically for the 2013 World Championship. However, his impressive play in events in 2012 earned him the first spot of sixteen that were available for non-qualified players via the ProTour Order of Merit. White was over £18,000 ahead of the second placed Michael Smith. He was beaten by Mark Webster 3–1 in the first round. However, after the tournament he was ranked world number 30, the first time White has been inside the top 32. He was beaten by Steve West 9–3 in the third round of the UK Open. At the eighth Players Championship in September, White won his first PDC tournament by defeating Simon Whitlock 6–3 in a final with an average of almost 101. He had earlier beaten two-time World Champion Adrian Lewis 6–1 and the title saw him move up to 23rd on the PDC Order of Merit. White faced Dave Chisnall in the first round of the World Grand Prix and missed eight darts for legs in the deciding set to lose 2–1. He made his debut in the Championship League and won his group at the first time of asking by beating Peter Wright 6–4 in the final. In the Winners Group he won three of his seven matches to finish sixth in the eight man table. Whilst the top 16 players on the Order of Merit were competing in the Masters in November, White took full advantage by winning his second PDC ranking title at the 14th Players Championship with a 6–3 success over Andy Jenkins in the final. He beat Ronnie Baxter 6–3 and Terry Jenkins 9–2 at the Players Championship Finals to reach the quarter-finals of a PDC major event for the first time. White fell 4–0 down to Andy Hamilton and could never recover the deficit as he lost 9–6.

=== 2014 ===
White was the 21st seed for the 2014 World Championship and won his first ever match in the event by beating Australia's Kyle Anderson 3–1. He then survived a huge scare in the second round as Kim Huybrechts came back from 3–0 down to level, but White held his nerve to take the deciding set. He then produced a successful fightback in the third round against Richie Burnett by winning nine of eleven legs from 3–1 behind to triumph 4–3. In the quarter-finals White came up against fourth seed Simon Whitlock and trailed 3–0 and 4–1, but then won a trio of sets each by three legs to one to square the game at 4–4. White missed two darts to hold his throw in the fifth leg of the decider and lost the next leg to fall agonosingly short of reaching the semi-finals. He moved into the top 16 on the Order of Merit for the first time after the tournament. A third successive quarter-final in a major event came at the UK Open by beating Gary Anderson 9–7 in the fifth round. White faced Michael van Gerwen and trailed 6–2 and 8–5 but pulled the gap back to 9–8 before losing the next leg to fall just short of reaching his first televised semi-final.

His first final in the floor events of 2014 came at the fourth Players Championship, but he was whitewashed 6–0 by Phil Taylor. Another final followed at the sixth event and he led Robert Thornton 4–2 and 5–4, before missing six darts to win the match in the next leg, instead going on to lose 6–5. White ensured that he reached the second round of the World Matchplay for the third year running by seeing off Terry Jenkins 10–4, but then was heavily beaten 13–4 by Van Gerwen. White won his third PDC title at the penultimate Players Championship courtesy of a 6–2 success over Dave Chisnall.

=== 2015 ===
White won six consecutive legs against Kim Huybrechts in the second round of the 2015 World Championship to take a 3–2 lead, but from there could only win one more leg as he lost 4–3. White threw a nine-dart finish in a 6–3 victory over Mervyn King in the quarter-finals of the final UK Open Qualifier and then averaged 109.37 in edging past Raymond van Barneveld 6–5, before losing 6–2 against Phil Taylor in the final. He also hit a nine-darter during a 6–3 success over Jamie Lewis in the semi-finals of the 11th Players Championship, but lost 6–1 to Dave Chisnall in the final. A third defeat in a final this year came at the 14th event where he was eliminated 6–2 by Jelle Klaasen.

White had a high quality game with Stephen Bunting in the first round of the World Matchplay as both players averaged over 100 (White the highest with 103.51), 17 maximums were thrown and White took out three ton-plus finishes to win 10–6. He played in the quarter-finals after ousting Simon Whitlock 13–9 and led Michael van Gerwen 6–1, before being pegged back to 7–7. White fell 12–10 behind, but produced a 12-dart leg to move 13–12 in front, before a host of missed doubles from White including seven in the final leg saw him lose 16–13. His first title of 2015 came at the 17th Players Championship when he held on from 5–1 ahead of Chisnall to win 6–5.

In the second round of the World Grand Prix, White averaged 97.96 in the double-to-start event in defeating reigning world champion Gary Anderson 3–1 in sets. Although he averaged 20 points lower in the quarter-finals against Robert Thornton, the match went to a deciding leg at 2–2 in sets which White lost. He was eliminated out of the European Championship at the first round stage and couldn't get out of his group at the Grand Slam. However, deciding leg victories over Raymond van Barneveld and Gerwyn Price saw White reach his third major quarter-final of the year at the Players Championship Finals. White's search for a first PDC semi-final will go on though, as he was ousted 10–6 by Mensur Suljović.

=== 2016 ===
White took the first set against Dimitri van den Bergh in the opening round of the 2016 World Championship, but went on to lose 3–1. He was defeated 9–6 by Simon Whitlock in the third round of the UK Open, but in the final of the fifth Players Championship event, he whitewashed world number one Michael van Gerwen 6–0 in the final, with an average of 106.20. White also secured the 11th event with a 6–3 win over Joe Cullen. After comfortably seeing off Daryl Gurney 10–2 in the first round of the World Matchplay, White lost 11–6 to Peter Wright. He returned to win his third Players Championship crown of the year and seventh PDC tournament in his career by beating Benito van de Pas 6–4. White eliminated Terry Jenkins 6–2 at the European Championship and came back from 8–3 to force a deciding leg against Mensur Suljović, but lost it to be defeated 10–9. His titles during the year qualified him for the Grand Slam and a win over Darryl Fitton would have seen him progress from his group, but he lost 5–4 from being 3–1 up and missed three match darts in the process.

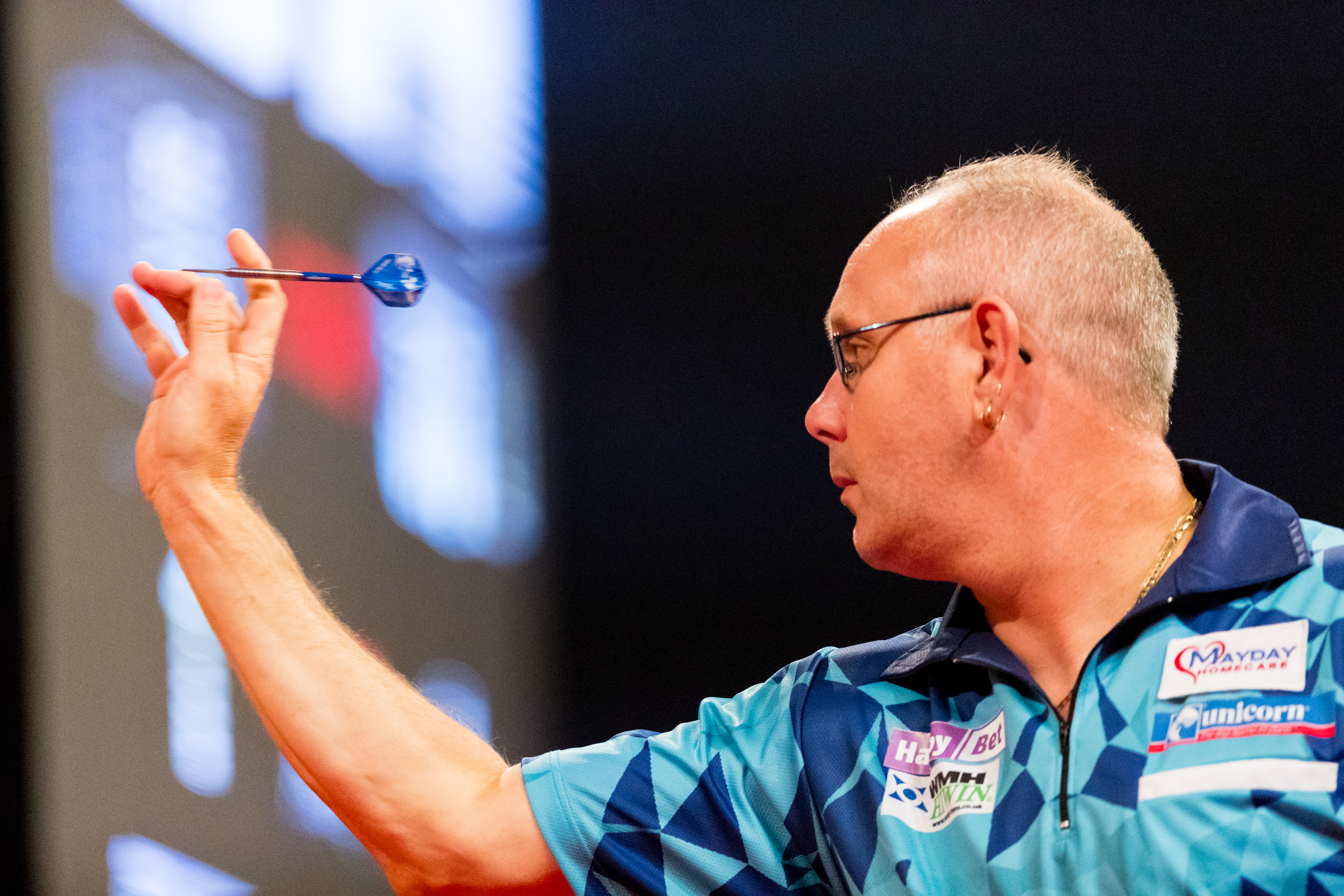
White at the 2017 German Darts Grand Prix

=== 2017 ===
White faced Peter Wright in the third round of the 2017 World Championship after overcoming Kevin Simm 3–0 and Jonny Clayton 4–1. He lost nine of the first ten legs and could never recover in a 4–1 defeat. His quarter-final with Gerwyn Price at the UK Open went to a deciding leg and White was on 20 to win but burst his score by hitting double 15 to allow Price to edge through 10–9. White thrashed Michael van Gerwen 6–1 to reach the semi-finals of the German Darts Open, where he lost 6–3 to Benito van de Pas. His first final of the year was at the 12th Players Championship, but he missed five darts for the title in a 6–5 defeat to Rob Cross. He reached another final two events later, but lost 6–1 to Gary Anderson.

=== 2018 ===
White was eliminated in the second round of the 2018 World Championship following a 4–1 defeat to Gerwyn Price. He hit a nine-darter during his win against Daryl Gurney in UK Open Qualifier 2. White won two Players Championship titles during the year, narrowly beating Dave Chisnall 6–5 to win the sixth event and beating Darren Webster 6–3 to win the 16th event. He also secured his first ever European Tour title at the Dutch Darts Championship with an 8–5 victory over Ricky Evans in the final, achieving the feat in his 63rd European Tour event.

=== 2019 ===
Under the new format, White started the 2019 World Championship in the second round as 11th seed. However, he was beaten 3–2 by Devon Petersen after Petersen recovered from a 2–0 deficit.

A run of form in April and May saw White reach four consecutive European Tour finals. He was defeated by Michael van Gerwen in the finals of both the German Darts Open and Austrian Darts Open by scores of 8–3 and 8–7 respectively. White won his second European Tour title at the European Darts Grand Prix, surviving a last-leg decider to beat Peter Wright 8–7. He added a third title at the Dutch Darts Masters with another 8–7 victory, this time over Van Gerwen who had just won the Premier League. These performances resulted in White entering the world's top 10. He hit a nine-darter and averaged 107 in the final of Players Championship 26 but was defeated 8–7 by Mensur Suljović.

White reached the quarter-finals of the World Grand Prix, where he was defeated 3–2 by Chris Dobey. He reached his maiden major semi-final at the Players Championship Finals following a 10–9 win over William O'Connor in the quarter-finals, before losing 11–8 to eventual champion Michael van Gerwen.

=== 2020–2021 ===
White entered the 2020 World Championship second round as the ninth seed but suffered another early exit, losing 3–1 to Darius Labanauskas. On the Pro Tour, he won the eighth Players Championship event after defeating James Wade 8–3 in the final. He reached the quarter-finals of the European Championship, eliminating Michael van Gerwen in the process. He went out of the tournament after losing to Devon Petersen.

White was the tenth seed at the 2021 World Championship. He was defeated 3–1 by Kim Huybrechts in a match where both players averaged over 100. He reached the quarter-finals of the World Grand Prix, where he was beaten 3–1 by Danny Noppert.

=== 2022–present ===
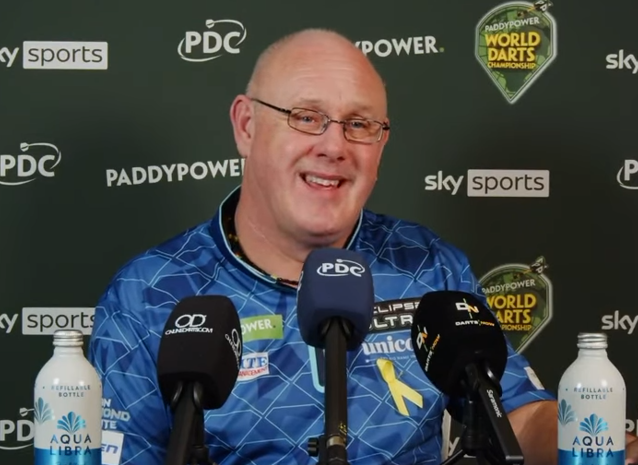
Ian White at a press conference during the 2025 World Championship

At the 2022 World Championship, White progressed to the third round of the competition for the first time since the 2018 event after winning his opening match 3–1 against Chris Landman. After the win, White noted that it was difficult seeing himself drop down the rankings, as the lack of European Tour events in 2020 and 2021 due to the COVID-19 pandemic meant he was unable to win back large portions of his 2019 ranking money that was taken off after two years. In the third round, White led Gary Anderson 3–0 but ultimately lost the match 4–3.

After losing in the Tour Card Holder Qualifier for the 2023 World Championship, White failed to qualify for the World Championship for the first time since 2011. He returned at the 2024 World Championship, but was beaten in the first round by Japanese debutant Tomoya Goto.

At the 2024 Players Championship Finals, White produced an upset win over Michael van Gerwen in the first round, winning 6–1. White was due to face Sandro Eric Sosing in the first round of the 2025 World Championship, but Sosing was forced to withdraw from the match on medical grounds. White received a bye to the second round, where he defeated reigning European Champion Ritchie Edhouse 3–1. He lost to Luke Littler 4–1 in the third round.

== World Championship results ==
=== BDO ===
- 2010: First round (lost to Stephen Bunting 0–3)

=== PDC ===
- 2012: First round (lost to Robert Thornton 1–3)
- 2013: First round (lost to Mark Webster 1–3)
- 2014: Quarter-finals (lost to Simon Whitlock 4–5)
- 2015: Second round (lost to Kim Huybrechts 3–4)
- 2016: First round (lost to Dimitri van den Bergh 1–3)
- 2017: Third round (lost to Peter Wright 1–4)
- 2018: Second round (lost to Gerwyn Price 1–4)
- 2019: Second round (lost to Devon Petersen 2–3)
- 2020: Second round (lost to Darius Labanauskas 1–3)
- 2021: Second round (lost to Kim Huybrechts 1–3)
- 2022: Third round (lost to Gary Anderson 3–4)
- 2024: First round (lost to Tomoya Goto 1–3)
- 2025: Third round (lost to Luke Littler 1–4)
- 2026: Second round (lost to Rob Cross 1–3)

== Career finals ==
=== Independent major finals: 1 (1 runner-up) ===
Outcome	No.	Year	Championship	Opponent in the final	Score
Runner-up	1.	1997	News of the World Championship	(England) Phil Taylor	0–2 (l)

== Performance timeline ==
=== BDO ===
Tournament	2005	2008	2010
BDO Ranked televised events
World Championship	DNP/DNQ		1R
World Masters	1R	3R	DNP

=== PDC ===
Tournament	2011	2012	2013	2014	2015	2016	2017	2018	2019	2020	2021	2022	2023	2024	2025	2026
PDC Ranked televised events
World Championship	DNQ	1R	1R	QF	2R	1R	3R	2R	2R	2R	2R	3R	DNQ	1R	3R	2R
World Masters (Note: A non-ranked event until 2025)	Not held		DNQ		1R	1R	1R	1R	1R	1R	1R	1R	DNQ		Prel.	Prel.
UK Open	3R	3R	3R	QF	4R	3R	QF	5R	4R	5R	4R	5R	4R	3R	3R	3R
World Matchplay	DNQ	2R	2R	2R	QF	2R	1R	2R	2R	1R	2R	Did not qualify				
World Grand Prix	DNQ	2R	1R	1R	QF	1R	1R	2R	QF	1R	QF	Did not qualify				
European Championship	DNQ	2R	DNQ	2R	1R	2R	2R	1R	1R	QF	Did not qualify					
Grand Slam (Note: A non-ranked event until 2015)	RR	DNQ			RR	RR	DNQ	RR	2R	2R	Did not qualify					
Players Championship Finals	DNQ	1R	QF	1R	QF	2R	3R	2R	SF	3R	1R	DNQ	1R	2R	1R	DNQ
PDC Non-ranked televised events
World Series Finals	Not held				1R	DNQ		1R	QF	1R	Did not qualify					
Career statistics
Year-end ranking	67	33	18	15	9	14	17	11	9	11	24	43	64	49	52	

==== European Tour ====
Season	1	2	3	4	5	6	7	8	9	10	11	12	13	14	15
2012	ADO; 1R	GDC; DNQ	EDO; 1R	GDM; F	DDM; 3R										
2013	UKM; 1R	EDT; 3R	EDO; 2R	ADO; 1R	GDT; 2R	GDC; 2R	GDM; 2R	DDM; 2R							
2014	GDC; QF	DDM; SF	GDM; 3R	ADO; 2R	GDT; 3R	EDO; 2R	EDG; 2R	EDT; 3R							
2015	GDC; 2R	GDT; 2R	GDM; 2R	DDM; 3R	IDO; SF	EDO; 2R	EDT; SF	EDM; 3R	EDG; QF						
2016	DDM; 2R	GDM; QF	GDT; SF	EDM; 2R	ADO; 3R	EDO; 3R	IDO; 3R	EDT; 3R	EDG; 2R	GDC; 3R					
2017	GDC; QF	GDM; 2R	GDO; SF	EDG; 2R	GDT; 3R	EDM; 3R	ADO; 2R	EDO; 2R	DDM; 2R	GDG; QF	IDO; 3R	EDT; 2R			
2018	EDO; 2R	GDG; 3R	GDO; SF	ADO; QF	EDG; 3R	DDM; 2R	GDT; 2R	DDO; 2R	EDM; QF	GDC; 2R	DDC; W	IDO; 3R	EDT; 2R		
2019	EDO; 2R	GDC; 3R	GDG; 2R	GDO; F	ADO; F	EDG; W	DDM; W	DDO; 3R	CDO; QF	ADC; QF	EDM; 3R	IDO; 2R	GDT; QF		
2020	BDC; 2R	GDC; 2R	EDG; SF	IDO; 2R											
2022	Did not qualify			ADO; 1R	EDO; 1R	Did not qualify			EDM; QF	HDT; 1R	GDO; 1R	DNQ			
2023	BSD; DNQ	EDO; 2R	IDO; 1R	GDG; 1R	ADO; 1R	DDC; 2R	BDO; 1R	CDO; 1R	EDG; 1R	Did not qualify					
2024	Did not qualify			EDG; 1R	Did not qualify							SDT; 1R	CDO; DNQ		
2025	Did not qualify				ADO; 2R	Did not qualify			BSD; 1R	FDT; 1R	CDO; 1R	DNQ			
2026	DNQ		BDO; 1R	GDG; 1R	EDG; 1R	ADO; 2R	IDO; DNQ	BSD; 1R	Did not qualify						

==== Players Championships ====
Season	1	2	3	4	5	6	7	8	9	10	11	12	13	14	15	16	17	18	19	20	21	22	23	24	25	26	27	28	29	30	31	32	33	34	35	36	37
2010	Did not participate									DER; 1R	WIG; 2R	WIG; 2R	SAL; DNP		BAR; 2R	BAR; 2R	HAA; 1R	HAA; 4R	LVE; 1R	LVE; 1R	LVE; 3R	SYD; DNP	ONT; DNP	ONT; DNP	CRA; 2R	CRA; 3R	NUL; 4R	NUL; 1R	DUB; SF	DUB; 4R	KIL; DNP	BNA; 2R	BNA; 1R	BAR; 2R	BAR; 2R	DER; 2R	DER; 2R
2011	HAL; 2R	HAL; 1R	DER; 1R	DER; 1R	CRA; 1R	CRA; 2R	VIE; 1R	VIE; 4R	CRA; 1R	CRA; 2R	BAR; 2R	BAR; 1R	NUL; 1R	NUL; 2R	ONT; 1R	ONT; 4R	DER; 1R	DER; 1R	NUL; 2R	NUL; 2R	DUB; 2R	DUB; 3R	KIL; 4R	GLA; 2R	GLA; 2R	ALI; 2R	ALI; 2R	CRA; QF	CRA; 1R	WIG; 2R	WIG; 4R						
2012	ALI; SF	ALI; 2R	REA; 3R	REA; 1R	CRA; F	CRA; 3R	BIR; 2R	BIR; 3R	CRA; QF	CRA; SF	BAR; F	BAR; 2R	DUB; 4R	DUB; 3R	KIL; 4R	KIL; QF	CRA; SF	CRA; F	BAR; 4R	BAR; 2R																	
2013	WIG; 3R	WIG; 4R	WIG; 3R	WIG; 3R	CRA; 4R	CRA; 4R	BAR; QF	BAR; W	DUB; 3R	DUB; 1R	KIL; 3R	KIL; 2R	WIG; SF	WIG; W	BAR; 3R	BAR; 4R																					
2014	BAR; 3R	BAR; 4R	CRA; 4R	CRA; F	WIG; 4R	WIG; F	WIG; 3R	WIG; QF	CRA; 3R	CRA; 1R	COV; 3R	COV; QF	CRA; 1R	CRA; SF	DUB; 3R	DUB; 2R	CRA; 1R	CRA; QF	COV; W	COV; QF																	
2015	BAR; SF	BAR; 4R	BAR; 1R	BAR; 4R	BAR; 1R	COV; SF	COV; QF	COV; 2R	CRA; 3R	CRA; 1R	BAR; F	BAR; 1R	WIG; QF	WIG; F	BAR; 3R	BAR; QF	DUB; W	DUB; 2R	COV; 2R	COV; QF																	
2016	BAR; QF	BAR; QF	BAR; 2R	BAR; 1R	BAR; W	BAR; 1R	BAR; 4R	COV; 3R	COV; 1R	BAR; 1R	BAR; W	BAR; 3R	BAR; W	BAR; 1R	BAR; 1R	BAR; 3R	DUB; 1R	DUB; QF	BAR; 2R	BAR; 1R																	
2017	BAR; 2R	BAR; 1R	BAR; 2R	BAR; QF	MIL; QF	MIL; 4R	BAR; 2R	BAR; 1R	WIG; 4R	WIG; QF	MIL; 2R	MIL; F	WIG; 2R	WIG; F	BAR; 1R	BAR; QF	BAR; 1R	BAR; 3R	DUB; 1R	DUB; 3R	BAR; 2R	BAR; 4R															
2018	BAR; QF	BAR; SF	BAR; 2R	BAR; 1R	MIL; 2R	MIL; W	BAR; 2R	BAR; 2R	WIG; 4R	WIG; 1R	MIL; 2R	MIL; SF	WIG; F	WIG; 3R	BAR; QF	BAR; W	BAR; 3R	BAR; SF	DUB; 2R	DUB; F	BAR; 2R	BAR; 1R															
2019	WIG; 4R	WIG; 3R	WIG; F	WIG; 2R	BAR; QF	BAR; 2R	WIG; 1R	WIG; QF	BAR; QF	BAR; SF	BAR; SF	BAR; QF	BAR; 1R	BAR; 2R	BAR; QF	BAR; 1R	WIG; 1R	WIG; 1R	BAR; 1R	BAR; 3R	HIL; SF	HIL; QF	BAR; 4R	BAR; 2R	BAR; SF	BAR; F	DUB; 1R	DUB; QF	BAR; F	BAR; 3R							
2020	BAR; 1R	BAR; 3R	WIG; 2R	WIG; F	WIG; 2R	WIG; QF	BAR; QF	BAR; W	MIL; 2R	MIL; 2R	MIL; QF	MIL; SF	MIL; 2R	NIE; 3R	NIE; QF	NIE; SF	NIE; 1R	NIE; 2R	COV; 1R	COV; 1R	COV; QF	COV; 3R	COV; 3R														
2021	BOL; 3R	BOL; QF	BOL; SF	BOL; 1R	MIL; 2R	MIL; 2R	MIL; 1R	MIL; 1R	NIE; 1R	NIE; 1R	NIE; 1R	NIE; 2R	MIL; 4R	MIL; 1R	MIL; 2R	MIL; 1R	COV; 4R	COV; 2R	COV; 2R	COV; 2R	BAR; SF	BAR; 1R	BAR; DNP	BAR; 2R	BAR; 3R	BAR; 1R	BAR; 1R	BAR; 2R	BAR; 2R	BAR; 1R							
2022	BAR; 2R	BAR; 1R	WIG; 1R	WIG; 1R	BAR; 2R	BAR; QF	NIE; 2R	NIE; 1R	BAR; 1R	BAR; 1R	BAR; 4R	BAR; 2R	BAR; 2R	WIG; 2R	WIG; 1R	WIG; 1R	WIG; 1R	BAR; 3R	BAR; 2R	BAR; 3R	BAR; 2R	BAR; 1R	BAR; 2R	BAR; 1R	BAR; 1R	BAR; 1R	BAR; 1R	BAR; 1R	BAR; 1R	BAR; 2R							
2023	BAR; 3R	BAR; 3R	BAR; 1R	BAR; 3R	BAR; 3R	BAR; 4R	BAR; 2R	HIL; 1R	WIG; 1R	WIG; SF	LEI; 1R	LEI; 1R	HIL; 1R	HIL; 1R	LEI; 4R	LEI; 1R	HIL; 2R	HIL; 4R	BAR; 2R	BAR; 2R	BAR; 1R	BAR; 4R	BAR; 3R	BAR; 3R	BAR; 1R	BAR; 3R	BAR; 2R	BAR; 1R	BAR; 3R	BAR; 2R							
2024	WIG; 3R	WIG; 1R	LEI; 2R	LEI; 1R	HIL; 4R	HIL; 2R	LEI; QF	LEI; 2R	HIL; 3R	HIL; 1R	HIL; 3R	HIL; 2R	MIL; 1R	MIL; 1R	MIL; 1R	MIL; 1R	MIL; 2R	MIL; 1R	MIL; 2R	WIG; 2R	WIG; 4R	MIL; 1R	MIL; 4R	WIG; 2R	WIG; 2R	WIG; 2R	WIG; 3R	WIG; 1R	LEI; 2R	LEI; 1R							
2025	WIG; 1R	WIG; 2R	ROS; 1R	ROS; 1R	LEI; 1R	LEI; 1R	HIL; 2R	HIL; 4R	LEI; F	LEI; 1R	LEI; 2R	LEI; SF	ROS; 1R	ROS; 1R	HIL; 2R	HIL; 3R	LEI; 1R	LEI; 2R	LEI; 2R	LEI; 2R	LEI; 1R	HIL; 3R	HIL; 3R	MIL; 1R	MIL; 2R	HIL; 1R	HIL; 1R	LEI; 2R	LEI; 3R	LEI; 2R	WIG; 2R	WIG; 1R	WIG; 1R	WIG; 1R			
2026	HIL; 1R	HIL; 2R	WIG; 2R	WIG; 1R	LEI; 1R	LEI; 2R	LEI; 3R	LEI; 2R	WIG; 3R	WIG; 1R	MIL; 2R	MIL; 1R	HIL; 1R	HIL; 2R	LEI; 3R	LEI; SF	LEI; 1R	LEI; 1R	MIL; 1R	MIL; 3R	WIG; 2R	WIG; 1R	LEI; 1R	LEI; 1R	HIL; DNP		LEI; 1R	LEI; 2R	ROS; 1R	ROS; 2R	ROS; 1R	ROS; 1R	LEI; 2R	LEI; 1R			

Performance Table Legend
W	Won the tournament	F	Finalist	SF	Semifinalist	QF	Quarterfinalist	#R; RR; L#	Lost in # round Round-robin; Last # stage	DQ	Disqualified
DNQ	Did not qualify	DNP	Did not participate	WD	Withdrew	NH	Tournament not held	#R; RR; L#	Lost in # round Round-robin; Last # stage	NYF	Not yet founded
