= 2015 European Darts Trophy =

Tournament information
- Dates: 11–13 September 2015
- Venue: RWE-Sporthalle
- Location: Mülheim, Germany
- Organisation(s): Professional Darts Corporation (PDC)
- Format: Legs
- Prize fund: £115,000
- Winner's share: £25,000
- High checkout: 161; Max Hopp (x2); Kim Huybrechts

Champion(s)
- Michael Smith (ENG)

The 2015 European Darts Trophy was the seventh of nine PDC European Tour events on the 2015 PDC Pro Tour. The tournament took place at the RWE-Sporthalle in Mülheim, Germany from 11 to 13 September 2015. It featured a field of 48 players and £115,000 in prize money, with £25,000 going to the winner.

Michael Smith won the title by defeating Michael van Gerwen 6–2 in the final.

== Prize money ==
The prize fund was increased to £115,000 after being £100,000 for the previous two years.

Stage (num. of players)		Prize money
Winner	(1)	£25,000
Runner-up	(1)	£10,000
Semi-finalists	(2)	£5,000
Quarter-finalists	(4)	£3,500
Third round losers	(8)	£2,000
Second round losers	(16)	£1,500
First round losers	(16)	£1,000
Total	£115,000	

== Qualification and format ==
The top 16 players from the PDC ProTour Order of Merit on 30 June 2015 automatically qualified for the event. The remaining 32 places went to players from three qualifying events - 20 from the UK Qualifier (held in Wigan on 3 July), eight from the European Qualifier (held in Mülheim on 10 September) at the same time as the European Darts Matchplay and four from the Host Nation Qualifier (held at the venue the day before the event started).

The following players took part in the tournament:

Top 16
1. (Netherlands) Michael van Gerwen (runner-up)
2. (England) Michael Smith (winner)
3. (England) James Wade (quarter-finals)
4. (England) Adrian Lewis (third round)
5. (Scotland) Peter Wright (semi-finals)
6. (England) Ian White (semi-finals)
7. (Northern Ireland) Brendan Dolan (second round)
8. (England) Dave Chisnall (quarter-finals)
9. (England) Justin Pipe (third round)
10. (England) Mervyn King (quarter-finals)
11. (Australia) Simon Whitlock (second round)
12. (Belgium) Kim Huybrechts (third round)
13. (England) Terry Jenkins (quarter-finals)
14. (Scotland) Robert Thornton (third round)
15. (Netherlands) Vincent van der Voort (second round)
16. (Netherlands) Benito van de Pas (second round)

UK Qualifier
- (England) Chris Dobey (first round)
- (England) Stephen Bunting (second round)
- (Wales) Gerwyn Price (first round)
- (England) Steve West (second round)
- (England) James Hubbard (first round)
- (England) Adam Hunt (second round)
- (Scotland) Jamie Bain (first round)
- (Scotland) Mark Barilli (first round)
- (Republic of Ireland) Connie Finnan (first round)
- (England) James Wilson (second round)
- (England) Jason Lovett (third round)
- (England) Mark Frost (first round)
- (England) Andy Jenkins (second round)
- (England) Kevin Painter (third round)
- (England) Alan Norris (first round)
- (Northern Ireland) Daryl Gurney (second round)
- (England) Mark Dudbridge (first round)
- (England) David Pallett (first round)
- (England) Wes Newton (second round)
- (England) Darren Johnson (second round)

European Qualifier
- (Poland) Krzysztof Ratajski (first round)
- (Austria) Rowby-John Rodriguez (third round)
- (Netherlands) Dirk van Duijvenbode (first round)
- (Spain) Cristo Reyes (third round)
- (Austria) Mensur Suljović (second round)
- (Netherlands) Raymond van Barneveld (first round)
- (Netherlands) Jan Dekker (second round)
- (Netherlands) Christian Kist (second round)

Host Nation Qualifier
- (Germany) Jyhan Artut (first round)
- (Germany) Max Hopp (second round)
- (Germany) Christian Soethe (first round)
- (Germany) Martin Schindler (first round)

== Draw ==
First round (best of 11 legs); 11 September
(England) Adam Hunt 92.55	6
(Poland) Krzysztof Ratajski 90.44	5
(Germany) Jyhan Artut 92.04	5
(England) Jason Lovett 89.45	6
(Scotland) Jamie Bain 92.43	3
(Netherlands) Jan Dekker 90.09	6
(Austria) Mensur Suljović 95.94	6
(Germany) Christian Soethe 87.07	0
(Wales) Gerwyn Price 84.94	1
(England) Andy Jenkins 86.87	6
(Netherlands) Raymond van Barneveld 92.54	4
(Germany) Max Hopp 96.28	6
(England) James Wilson 94.64	6
(Germany) Martin Schindler 82.49	4
(England) David Pallett 90.76	4
(England) Steve West 90.00	6
(England) Wes Newton 89.87	6
(England) Chris Dobey 92.53	3
(England) Kevin Painter 93.70	6
(England) Alan Norris 88.43	3
(Spain) Cristo Reyes 90.18	6
(Republic of Ireland) Connie Finnan 89.76	2
(Northern Ireland) Daryl Gurney 92.81	6
(England) Mark Frost 87.78	2
(England) Stephen Bunting 93.11	6
(Scotland) Mark Barilli 83.61	4
(Austria) Rowby-John Rodriguez 89.92	6
(England) James Hubbard 73.17	1
(England) Mark Dudbridge 92.64	5
(England) Darren Johnson 94.88	6
(Netherlands) Christian Kist 92.77	6
(Netherlands) Dirk van Duijvenbode 86.86	5

Second round (best of 11 legs); 12 September
1	(Netherlands) Michael van Gerwen 107.69	6
(England) Adam Hunt 89.80	1
16	(Netherlands) Benito van de Pas 86.84	4
(England) Jason Lovett 89.44	6
8	(England) Dave Chisnall 99.23	6
(Netherlands) Jan Dekker 93.37	2
9	(England) Justin Pipe 85.27	6
(Austria) Mensur Suljović 84.75	5
5	(Scotland) Peter Wright 90.04	6
(England) Andy Jenkins 90.43	4
12	(Belgium) Kim Huybrechts 107.36	6
(Germany) Max Hopp 86.54	0
4	(England) Adrian Lewis 98.84	6
(England) James Wilson 82.82	3
13	(England) Terry Jenkins 108.58	6
(England) Steve West 103.15	5
2	(England) Michael Smith 97.11	6
(England) Wes Newton 90.65	3
15	(Netherlands) Vincent van der Voort 87.40	4
(England) Kevin Painter 92.16	6
7	(Northern Ireland) Brendan Dolan 89.18	4
(Spain) Cristo Reyes 93.18	6
10	(England) Mervyn King 101.50	6
(Northern Ireland) Daryl Gurney 93.29	4
6	(England) Ian White 98.88	6
(England) Stephen Bunting 98.10	3
11	(Australia) Simon Whitlock 90.66	1
(Austria) Rowby-John Rodriguez 97.33	6
3	(England) James Wade 90.44	6
(England) Darren Johnson 82.27	1
14	(Scotland) Robert Thornton 90.95	6
(Netherlands) Christian Kist 84.08	4

Third round (best of 11 legs); 13 September
1	(Netherlands) van Gerwen 92.97	6
(England) Lovett 86.35	0
8	(England) Chisnall 101.48	6
9	(England) Pipe 95.37	2
5	(Scotland) Wright 99.90	6
12	(Belgium) Huybrechts 103.32	5
4	(England) Lewis 99.56	5
13	(England) T. Jenkins 91.62	6
2	(England) Smith 91.06	6
(England) Painter 88.57	4
(Spain) Reyes 89.60	5
10	(England) King 96.04	6
6	(England) White 93.78	6
(Austria) Rodriguez 94.01	3
3	(England) Wade 99.61	6
14	(Scotland) Thornton 92.20	4

Quarter-finals (best of 11 legs); 13 September
1	(Netherlands) van Gerwen 92.97	6
8	(England) Chisnall 87.52	0
5	(Scotland) Wright 93.07	6
13	(England) T. Jenkins 90.23	5
2	(England) Smith 100.49	6
10	(England) King 91.09	2
6	(England) White 92.82	6
3	(England) Wade 90.87	4

Semi-finals (best of 11 legs); 13 September
1	(Netherlands) van Gerwen 106.16	6
5	(Scotland) Wright 94.77	2
2	(England) Smith 98.17	6
6	(England) White 89.62	3

Final (best of 11 legs); 13 September
1	(Netherlands) van Gerwen 101.12	2
2	(England) Smith 98.50	6
