= 2011 UK Open Qualifier 1 =

UK Open Qualifier 1

Tournament information
- Dates: Saturday 26 February
- Venue: Metrodome
- Location: Barnsley
- Country: England
- Organisation(s): PDC
- Format: Best of 11 legs
- Prize fund: £34,600
- Winner's share: £6,000

Champion(s)
- (England) Steve Brown

The 2011 UK Open Qualifier 1 was the first of eight 2011 UK Open Darts Qualifiers which was held at the Metrodome in Barnsley on Saturday 26 February.

== Prize money ==
| Stage | Prize money (Total-£34,600) |
|---|---|
| Winner | £6,000 |
| Runner Up | £3,000 |
| Semi Final | £2,000 |
| Quarter Final | £1,000 |
| Fourth Round | £600 |
| Third Round | £400 |
| Second Round | £200 |
| First Round | £0 |
| Preliminary Round | £0 |

== Draw ==
Second round
(Netherlands) | Vincent van der Voort | 5
(England) | Kirk Shepherd | 6
(Netherlands) | Roland Scholten | 4
(Australia) | Simon Whitlock | 6
(England) | Colin Lloyd | 6
(England) | Ryan Harrington | 0
(Netherlands) | Michael van Gerwen | 6
(England) | Andy Hutchings | 1
(England) | Chris Thompson | 0
(England) | Tony Eccles | 6
(Wales) | Wayne Atwood | 2
(England) | Mark Frost | 6
(England) | Stephen Hardy | 3
(England) | Andy Jenkins | 6
(England) | Darren Johnson | 6
(Northern Ireland) | Brendan Dolan | 2
(England) | Scott Rand | 6
(Netherlands) | Co Stompé | 1
(South Africa) | Devon Petersen | 6
(England) | Alan Tabern | 1
(England) | Colin Osborne | 6
(England) | Mark Dudbridge | 4
(England) | Steve Brown | 6
(Germany) | Michael Rosenauer | 5
(England) | Wayne Jones | 4
(England) | Dennis Smith | 6
(Scotland) | Robert Thornton | 6
(Wales) | Richie Burnett | 2
(England) | Jamie Caven | 6
(England) | Steve Beaton | 3
(England) | Alex Roy | 5
(Wales) | Steve Evans | 6
(England) | Shaun Griffiths | 1
(England) | Denis Ovens | 6
(England) | Adrian Gray | 1
(Scotland) | John Henderson | 6
(England) | Matt Padgett | 3
(England) | Wes Newton | 6
(Canada) | John Part | 6
(England) | Andy Smith | 4
(England) | Sam Allen | 4
(England) | Terry Jenkins | 6
(Netherlands) | Jelle Klaasen | 2
(England) | Adrian Lewis | 6
(England) | Andy Hibbert | 1
(England) | Mark Walsh | 6
(England) | Jason Crawley | 6
(England) | Justin Pipe | 5
(England) | Colin Monk | 5
(England) | Geoff Whitworth | 6
(England) | Wayne Mardle | 1
(England) | Dave Chisnall | 6
(England) | Mark Hylton | 6
(England) | Mick Todd | 3
(England) | Martyn Turner | 1
(England) | Matt Clark | 6
(England) | Steve Maish | 1
(England) | Ian White | 6
(England) | Kevin Painter | 3
(England) | Terry Temple | 6
(England) | Kevin McDine | 6
(England) | Mervyn King | 4
(Australia) | Paul Nicholson | 5
(England) | Tony Ayres | 6

Third round
(England) | Kirk Shepherd | 0
(Australia) | Simon Whitlock | 6
(England) | Colin Lloyd | 6
(Netherlands) | Michael van Gerwen | 5
(England) | Tony Eccles | 5
(England) | Mark Frost | 6
(England) | Andy Jenkins | 6
(England) | Darren Johnson | 5
(England) | Scott Rand | 6
(South Africa) | Devon Petersen | 4
(England) | Colin Osborne | 2
(England) | Steve Brown | 6
(England) | Dennis Smith | 5
(Scotland) | Robert Thornton | 6
(England) | Jamie Caven | 6
(Wales) | Steve Evans | 3
(England) | Denis Ovens | 6
(Scotland) | John Henderson | 2
(England) | Wes Newton | 6
(Canada) | John Part | 4
(England) | Terry Jenkins | 5
(England) | Adrian Lewis | 6
(England) | Mark Walsh | 6
(England) | Jason Crawley | 2
(England) | Geoff Whitworth | 2
(England) | Dave Chisnall | 6
(England) | Mark Hylton | 6
(England) | Matt Clark | 3
(England) | Ian White | 6
(England) | Terry Temple | 5
(England) | Kevin McDine | 6
(England) | Tony Ayres | 4

Fourth round
(Australia) | Simon Whitlock | 6
(England) | Colin Lloyd | 1
(England) | Mark Frost | 6
(England) | Andy Jenkins | 5
(England) | Scott Rand | 5
(England) | Steve Brown | 6
(Scotland) | Robert Thornton | 2
(England) | Jamie Caven | 6
(England) | Denis Ovens | 1
(England) | Wes Newton | 6
(England) | Adrian Lewis | 6
(England) | Mark Walsh | 3
(England) | Dave Chisnall | 6
(England) | Mark Hylton | 1
(England) | Ian White | 6
(England) | Kevin McDine | 3

Quarter-finals
(Australia) | Simon Whitlock | 6
(England) | Mark Frost | 1
(England) | Steve Brown | 6
(England) | Jamie Caven | 5
(England) | Wes Newton | 3
(England) | Adrian Lewis | 6
(England) | Dave Chisnall | 3
(England) | Ian White | 6

Semi-finals
(Australia) | Simon Whitlock | 3
(England) | Steve Brown | 6
(England) | Adrian Lewis | 1
(England) | Ian White | 6

Final
(England) | Steve Brown | 6
(England) | Ian White | 3
