= 2009 Denmark Open darts =

Denmark Open

Tournament information
- Dates: 2009
- Country: Denmark
- Organisation(s): BDO, WDF, DDU
- Winner's share: 10,000 DKK

Champion(s)
- (England) Ian White

2009 Denmark Open is a darts tournament, which took place in Denmark in 2009.

== Results ==
=== Last 32 ===
Round	Player
Winner	(England) Ian White
Final	(England) Darryl Fitton
Semi-finals	(Netherlands) Mareno Michels
Semi-finals	(England) Tony Tarry
Quarter-finals	(Denmark) Per Laursen
Quarter-finals	(England) Garry Thompson
Quarter-finals	(Denmark) Stig Jørgensen
Quarter-finals	(Denmark) Benny Nielsen
Last 16	(Denmark) Søren Behrendsen
Last 16	(Denmark) Niels Jørgen Hansen
Last 16	(Sweden) Andree Bomander
Last 16	(England) Paul Carter
Last 16	(Germany) Kai Geselle
Last 16	(Denmark) Lean Jensen
Last 16	(Denmark) Jimmi Nielsen
Last 16	(Denmark) Bo Munk
Last 32	(Denmark) Jan-Ole Gjog
Last 32	(Denmark) Niels Heinsø
Last 32	(Denmark) Henrik Primdal
Last 32	(England) Alan Norris
Last 32	(Denmark) Ivan Madsen
Last 32	(Denmark) Per Faeligrch
Last 32	(Denmark) Karsten Lund
Last 32	(Denmark) Carl Henrik Hansen
Last 32	(Denmark) Vladimir Andersen
Last 32	(Denmark) Brian Buur
Last 32	(England) Michael Ovens
Last 32	(Denmark) Rune Marcussen
Last 32	(England) Dave Valentine
Last 32	(England) Dave Tebbutt
Last 32	(Denmark) Jan Erik Rasmussen
Last 32	(England) Mark Thomson
