= 2011 Denmark Open darts =

Denmark Open

Tournament information
- Dates: 2011
- Country: Denmark
- Organisation(s): BDO, WDF, DDU
- Winner's share: 20,000 DKK

Champion(s)
- (England) Steve West

2011 Denmark Open is a darts tournament, which took place in Denmark in 2011.

== Results ==
=== Last 32 ===
Round	Player
Winner	(England) Steve West
Final	(Denmark) Vladimir Andersen
Semi-finals	(Denmark) Stig Jørgensen
Semi-finals	(Denmark) Rene Madsen
Quarter-finals	(England) Clive Barden
Quarter-finals	(Denmark) Ivan Larsen
Quarter-finals	(Denmark) Niels Heinsøe
Quarter-finals	(Netherlands) Wesley Harms
Last 16	(Netherlands) Toon Greebe
Last 16	(Netherlands) Rico Dera
Last 16	(Norway) Robert Wagner
Last 16	(Denmark) Glenn Honore
Last 16	(Czech Republic) Petr Tous
Last 16	(Germany) Paul Lauritzen
Last 16	(Denmark) Palle Madsen
Last 16	(Denmark) Tonny Madsen
Last 32	(England) Dean Moss
Last 32	(Denmark) Claus Thomsen
Last 32	(Denmark) Peter Sønderby
Last 32	(Denmark) Lars Helsinghof
Last 32	(Denmark) Steen Lysen
Last 32	(Denmark) Kim Frithjof
Last 32	(Denmark) Torben Andersen
Last 32	(Netherlands) Jan Postma
Last 32	(Germany) Andy Zum Felde
Last 32	(Germany) Hendrik Schug
Last 32	(Netherlands) Jerry Hendriks
Last 32	(Denmark) Jimmy Svendsen
Last 32	(Poland) Piotr Krol
Last 32	(Denmark) Bent Schmidt
Last 32	(Denmark) Henrik Lollesgaard
Last 32	(Sweden) Claus Larsen
