= Adam Hunt =

English darts player (born 1993)

Personal information
- Nickname: "The Hunter"
- Born: 21 August 1993 (age 33) Chester-le-Street, County Durham, England

Sport
- Sport: Darts
- Playing since: 2009
- Darts: 23g Unicorn Signature
- Laterality: Right-handed
- Walk-on music: "Morning Glory" by Oasis

Organisation (see split in darts)
- PDC: 2011–present (Tour Card: 2014–2015, 2018–2022, 2024–2025)

PDC premier events – best performances
- World Championship: Last 32: 2021
- UK Open: Last 64: 2013, 2014, 2019, 2021, 2025
- Grand Slam: Last 16: 2020
- European Championship: Last 32: 2021
- PC Finals: Last 64: 2018, 2020

Other tournament wins
- Years
PDC Challenge Tour	2013, 2016
PDC Development Tour	2011, 2014, 2016, 2017

Adam Hunt (born 21 August 1993) is an English professional darts player who competes in Professional Darts Corporation (PDC) events. He has won titles on both of the PDC's secondary tours: four titles on the Development Tour; and two on the Challenge Tour.

A current PDC Tour Card holder, he is a two-time Pro Tour quarter-finalist: reaching the last eight at the 2014 Gibraltar Darts Trophy and 2018 Players Championship 14.

His best performance in a PDC major is reaching the last 16 of the 2020 Grand Slam. His best World Championship performance is reaching the last 32 at the 2021 PDC World Championship.

== Career ==
Hunt began competing in PDC events in 2011 and won his first tournament in his second month, beating Josh Jones 4–2 in the final of the opening youth tour event of the year. In 2012 he qualified for the UK Open for the first time and defeated Steve Maish 4–2, before losing 4–1 to Arron Monk in the second round. A year later he reached his first quarter-final on the Pro Tour at the first UK Open qualifier where he lost 6–1 to Michael van Gerwen. Hunt then won a Challenge Tour title with a 4–2 victory over Ricky Evans and advanced to the semi-finals of the World Youth Championship, where Michael Smith eliminated him 6–3. He went one better in the UK Open than last year as he lost in the third round 9–8 against Kevin McDine having led 4–1. Hunt's performances on the Challenge Tour saw him finish fourth on the Order of Merit to earn a two-year PDC tour card from 2014.

=== 2014 ===
In March, Hunt reached the third round of the UK Open for the second year in a row, but lost 9–5 to Paul Nicholson. Later in the month he beat Michael van Gerwen to reach the last 16 of the fourth Players Championship, where he was defeated 6–5 by Magnus Caris. Hunt was still competing in youth tournaments as well as the main professional tour and he won the ninth event with a 4–3 success over Rowby-John Rodriguez. He entered the 2014 PDC World Youth Championship as the number 1 seed, but lost in the last 16 to Kevin Voornhout 6-4. At the Gibraltar Darts Trophy, Hunt beat Mervyn King 6–3 and then survived 14 match darts from Dave Chisnall to edge him out 6–5 and reach his first European Tour quarter-final, but his run came to an end as Simon Whitlock defeated him 6–2.

=== 2015 ===
At the 2015 UK Open, Hunt lost 5–4 to Alan Tabern in the first round. He competed in the 2015 PDC World Youth Championship but lost 6–2 to Bradley Kirk. He was knocked out in the first round of the International Darts Open and European Darts Matchplay and at the European Darts Trophy he beat Krzysztof Ratajski 6–5, before losing 6–1 to Michael van Gerwen in the second round. Hunt advanced to the last 16 of an event once this year, but he was defeated 6–1 by Mensur Suljović at the eighth Players Championship.

=== 2016 ===
After the 2016 World Championship Hunt was 71st on the Order of Merit, narrowly outside the top 64 who remain on tour. He therefore entered Q School, but could not advance beyond the last 64 on any of the four days to fall off the tour. He therefore had to build his year on Challenge and Development Tour events winning one of each. He beat Dean Reynolds 4−2 in the fourth Development event and Jamie Bain 5−3 in the sixth Challenge event. Hunt also lost in the final of the sixth Development event 4−2 to Ross Twell. He was the number 5 seed for the 2016 PDC World Youth Championship but lost 6–5 in the first round to Sven Groen.

=== 2017 ===
Hunt finished third on the Development Tour Order of Merit, winning one event as well as being a three time runner up that year. By finishing third, he earned a two-year PDC Tour Card for 2018/2019 due to 2nd placed Dimitri van den Bergh already possessing a Tour Card by virtue of being in the world’s top 64. He was the number 4 seed for the 2017 PDC World Youth Championship but lost 6–2 to Josh Payne in the second round.

=== 2018 ===
He came through the Tour Card Holders’ Qualifier on 26 November with victories over Terry Temple, Maik Langendorf, Bradley Brooks and Richie Burnett to reach the 2019 PDC World Darts Championship. Hunt lost in the first round 3–0 to eventual quarter finalist Luke Humphries.

== World Championship results ==
=== PDC ===
- 2019: First round (lost to Luke Humphries 0–3)
- 2021: Third round (lost to Dirk van Duijvenbode 0–4)
- 2022: Second round (lost to Vincent van der Voort 0–3)
- 2026: First round (lost to Gary Anderson 2–3)

== Performance timeline ==
Tournament	2011	2012	2013	2014	2015	2016	2017	2018	2019	2020	2021	2022	2023	2024	2025	2026
PDC Ranked televised events
World Championship	Did not qualify								1R	DNQ	3R	2R	Did not qualify			1R
World Masters	NH		Did not qualify												Prel.	DNQ
UK Open	DNQ	2R	3R	3R	1R	DNQ		1R	4R	1R	4R	3R	DNP	WD	4R	DNQ
European Championship	Did not qualify										1R	Did not qualify				
Grand Slam	Did not qualify									2R	Did not qualify					
Players Championship Finals	Did not qualify							1R	DNQ	1R	Did not qualify					
PDC Non-ranked televised events
World Youth Championship	2R	2R	SF	QF	2R	1R	2R	Did not participate								
Career statistics
Season-end ranking (PDC)	125	114	115	94	70	–	112	98	80	59	42	79	–	128	84	

=== PDC European Tour ===
Season	1	2	3	4	5	6	7	8	9	10	11	12	13	14
2013	UKM; 1R	EDT; DNP	EDO; 1R	Did not qualify										
2014	Did not qualify					GDT; QF	Did not qualify							
2015	Did not qualify				IDO; 1R	EDO; DNQ	EDT; 2R	EDM; 1R	EDG; DNQ					
2017	GDC; 1R	GDM; DNQ	GDO; 3R	Did not qualify										
2018	Did not qualify			ADO; 2R	Did not qualify									
2019	EDO; 2R	Did not qualify										IDO; 1R	GDT; DNQ	
2020	BDC; DNQ	GDC; 2R	EDG; 2R	IDO; DNQ										
2021	HDT; DNQ	GDT; 2R												
2022	DNQ		GDG; 1R	Did not qualify									GDT; 1R	
2025	BDO; DNQ	EDT; 1R	Did not qualify											

=== PDC Players Championships ===
Season	1	2	3	4	5	6	7	8	9	10	11	12	13	14	15	16	17	18	19	20	21	22	23	24	25	26	27	28	29	30	31	32	33	34
2011 (Note: Not a Tour card holder)	HAL; DNP		DER; 2R	DER; DNP	CRA; 1R	CRA; 1R	VIE; DNP		CRA; 1R	CRA; 1R	BAR; 1R	BAR; 2R	DNP				DER; 2R	DER; 2R	NUL; 1R	NUL; 1R	DUB; 2R	DUB; 2R	KIL; 1R	DNP				CRA; 2R	CRA; 1R	WIG; 2R	WIG; 1R			
2012	Did not participate																CRA; 2R	CRA; 4R	BAR; 4R	BAR; 2R														
2013	WIG; 1R	WIG; 2R	WIG; 1R	WIG; 1R	CRA; DNP		BAR; 2R	BAR; 2R	DNP				WIG; 1R	WIG; 1R	BAR; 1R	BAR; 1R																		
2014	BAR; 1R	BAR; 1R	CRA; 2R	CRA; 4R	WIG; DNP		WIG; 2R	WIG; 1R	CRA; 2R	CRA; 1R	COV; 2R	COV; 1R	CRA; 1R	CRA; 1R	DUB; 2R	DUB; 1R	CRA; 1R	CRA; 1R	COV; 1R	COV; 2R														
2015	BAR; 2R	BAR; 1R	BAR; 2R	BAR; 2R	BAR; 1R	COV; 2R	COV; 1R	COV; 4R	CRA; 2R	CRA; 2R	BAR; 1R	BAR; 1R	WIG; 1R	WIG; DNP	BAR; 2R	BAR; 1R	DUB; 2R	DUB; 2R	COV; 1R	COV; 2R														
2016	Did not participate																																	
2017	BAR; 2R	BAR; 1R	BAR; 1R	BAR; DNP	MIL; 3R	MIL; 1R	BAR; 1R	BAR; 1R	WIG; 1R	WIG; 3R	MIL; 2R	MIL; DNP	WIG; 2R	WIG; 2R	BAR; 1R	BAR; 1R	BAR; 1R	BAR; 3R	DUB; DNP		BAR; 1R	BAR; 1R												
2018	BAR; 1R	BAR; 1R	BAR; 2R	BAR; 4R	MIL; 1R	MIL; 1R	BAR; 1R	BAR; 3R	WIG; 1R	WIG; 1R	MIL; 4R	MIL; 1R	WIG; 1R	WIG; QF	BAR; 4R	BAR; 1R	BAR; 1R	BAR; 1R	DUB; 2R	DUB; 1R	BAR; 4R	BAR; 1R												
2019	WIG; 1R	WIG; 1R	WIG; 1R	WIG; 3R	BAR; 1R	BAR; 2R	WIG; 2R	WIG; 1R	BAR; 1R	BAR; 1R	BAR; 1R	BAR; 2R	BAR; 2R	BAR; 2R	BAR; 1R	BAR; 2R	WIG; 1R	WIG; 1R	BAR; 1R	BAR; 2R	HIL; 3R	HIL; 1R	BAR; 2R	BAR; 1R	BAR; 2R	BAR; 1R	DUB; 2R	DUB; 2R	BAR; 2R	BAR; 3R				
2020	BAR; 3R	BAR; 2R	WIG; 2R	WIG; 1R	WIG; 2R	WIG; 1R	BAR; 2R	BAR; 1R	MIL; 1R	MIL; 1R	MIL; 1R	MIL; 1R	MIL; 1R	NIE; 1R	NIE; 3R	NIE; 2R	NIE; 2R	NIE; 3R	COV; 3R	COV; 2R	COV; 1R	COV; 3R	COV; 4R											
2021	BOL; 2R	BOL; 2R	BOL; 1R	BOL; 1R	MIL; 3R	MIL; 2R	MIL; 1R	MIL; 2R	NIE; 3R	NIE; 3R	NIE; 3R	NIE; 1R	DNP				COV; 2R	COV; 2R	COV; 2R	COV; 1R	BAR; 1R	BAR; 2R	BAR; 2R	BAR; 1R	BAR; 2R	BAR; 1R	BAR; 1R	BAR; 3R	BAR; 1R	BAR; 3R				
2022	BAR; 1R	BAR; 1R	WIG; 1R	WIG; 1R	BAR; 2R	BAR; 1R	NIE; 3R	NIE; 2R	BAR; 1R	BAR; 1R	BAR; 1R	BAR; 1R	BAR; 1R	WIG; 1R	WIG; 1R	NIE; 1R	NIE; 1R	BAR; 1R	BAR; 1R	BAR; 1R	BAR; 1R	BAR; 1R	BAR; 1R	BAR; 1R	BAR; 1R	BAR; 1R	BAR; 1R	BAR; 1R	BAR; 2R	BAR; 1R				
2023	Did not participate																																	
2024	WIG; 1R	WIG; 3R	LEI; 2R	LEI; 1R	HIL; 2R	HIL; 1R	LEI; 1R	LEI; 1R	HIL; 2R	HIL; 1R	HIL; 1R	HIL; 1R	MIL; 2R	MIL; 3R	MIL; 1R	MIL; 1R	MIL; 1R	MIL; 2R	MIL; 1R	WIG; 1R	WIG; 2R	LEI; 1R	LEI; 2R	WIG; 2R	WIG; 1R	WIG; 1R	WIG; 3R	WIG; 2R	LEI; 1R	LEI; 1R				
2025	WIG; 3R	WIG; 2R	ROS; 2R	ROS; 1R	LEI; 2R	LEI; 1R	HIL; 2R	HIL; 1R	LEI; 2R	LEI; 2R	LEI; 1R	LEI; 2R	ROS; 1R	ROS; 2R	HIL; 2R	HIL; 1R	LEI; 2R	LEI; 2R	LEI; 2R	LEI; 2R	LEI; 1R	HIL; 2R	HIL; 1R	MIL; 1R	MIL; 1R	HIL; 1R	HIL; 2R	LEI; 3R	LEI; 2R	LEI; 1R	WIG; 1R	WIG; 4R	WIG; 1R	WIG; 3R

Performance Table Legend
W	Won the tournament	F	Finalist	SF	Semifinalist	QF	Quarterfinalist	#R; RR; Prel.	Lost in # round Round-robin; Preliminary round	DQ	Disqualified
DNQ	Did not qualify	DNP	Did not participate	WD	Withdrew	NH	Tournament not held	#R; RR; Prel.	Lost in # round Round-robin; Preliminary round	NYF	Not yet founded
