= 2014 German Darts Championship =

Tournament information
- Dates: 31 January–2 February 2014
- Venue: Halle 39
- Location: Hildesheim
- Country: Germany
- Organisation(s): PDC
- Format: Legs
- Prize fund: £100,000
- Winner's share: £20,000

Champion(s)
- (Scotland) Gary Anderson

The 2014 German Darts Championship was the first of eight PDC European Tour events on the 2014 PDC Pro Tour. The tournament took place at Halle 39 in Hildesheim, Germany, between 31 January–2 February 2014. It featured a field of 48 players and £100,000 in prize money, with £20,000 going to the winner.

Gary Anderson won his first European Tour event by defeating Justin Pipe 6–5 in the final.

At with this event, all European Tour events were streamed live and free on the PDC YouTube channel.

== Prize money ==
Stage (num. of players)		Prize money
Winner	(1)	£20,000
Runner-up	(1)	£8,000
Semi-finalists	(2)	£4,000
Quarter-finalists	(4)	£3,000
Third round losers	(8)	£2,000
Second round losers	(16)	£1,250
First round losers	(16)	£1,000
Total	£100,000	

== Qualification and format ==
The top 16 players from the PDC ProTour Order of Merit on the 17 January 2014 automatically qualified for the event. In a change from previous European Tour events, this year there will be 48 players in each tournament instead of 64. Players who reach the event via qualifiers will play each other in the first round with the winners meeting the 16 seeded players in the last 32. 20 places were on offer at the UK Open Qualifier held in Wigan on 19 January. Eight and four places were awarded in the European and Host Nation Qualifiers respectively, which were held at the venue the day before the event started.

The following players took part in the tournament:

Top 16
1. (Netherlands) Michael van Gerwen (quarter-finals)
2. (England) Dave Chisnall (second round)
3. (Scotland) Peter Wright (second round)
4. (Northern Ireland) Brendan Dolan (second round)
5. (Belgium) Kim Huybrechts (third round)
6. (Scotland) Robert Thornton (third round)
7. (England) Jamie Caven (second round)
8. (England) Steve Beaton (second round)
9. (England) Wes Newton (third round)
10. (England) Mervyn King (third round)
11. (England) Ian White (quarter-finals)
12. (Canada) John Part (quarter-finals)
13. (Australia) Paul Nicholson (third round)
14. (Scotland) Gary Anderson (winner)
15. (England) Adrian Lewis (third round)
16. (England) Kevin Painter (second round)

UK Qualifier
- (England) Stuart Kellett (second round)
- (England) Andy Hamilton (second round)
- (England) Ronnie Baxter (semi-finals)
- (England) Justin Pipe (runner-up)
- (England) Matt Padgett (first round)
- (England) Barry Lynn (first round)
- (England) Steve Maish (first round)
- (Wales) Richie Burnett (first round)
- (England) Terry Jenkins (third round)
- (England) Wayne Jones (third round)
- (England) Michael Smith (second round)
- (England) Mark Dudbridge (first round)
- (England) Marc Dewsbury (first round)
- (England) Dean Winstanley (second round)
- (England) Brian Woods (first round)
- (England) Joey Palfreyman (second round)
- (England) Mark Walsh (first round)
- (Scotland) Jamie Bain (first round)
- (Republic of Ireland) Glenn Spearing (second round)
- (England) Lee Palfreyman (second round)

European Qualifier
- (Sweden) Magnus Caris (first round)
- (Netherlands) Raymond van Barneveld (quarter-finals)
- (Netherlands) Dick van Dijk (second round)
- (Netherlands) Jelle Klaasen (semi-finals)
- (Netherlands) Dirk van Duijvenbode (second round)
- (Belgium) Dimitri Van den Bergh (first round)
- (Netherlands) Leon de Geus (second round)
- (Netherlands) Ron Meulenkamp (first round)

Host Nation Qualifier
- (Germany) Tomas Seyler (first round)
- (Germany) Fabian Herz (first round)
- (Germany) Max Hopp (first round)
- (Germany) René Eidams (first round)

== Draw ==
First round (best of 11 legs); 31 January
(England) Steve Maish 80.06	5
(Netherlands) Leon de Geus 82.12	6
(Germany) Max Hopp 77.55	1
(England) Terry Jenkins 81.26	6
(Netherlands) Jelle Klaasen 89.29	6
(England) Marc Dewsbury 80.39	0
(England) Brian Woods 80.10	3
(Netherlands) Dirk van Duijvenbode 89.80	6
(Scotland) Jamie Bain 79.37	0
(England) Michael Smith 95.94	6
(Netherlands) Dick van Dijk 83.57	6
(England) Mark Dudbridge 86.30	5
(Wales) Richie Burnett 92.80	3
(England) Justin Pipe 96.72	6
(England) Stuart Kellett 84.55	6
(Germany) Fabian Herz 74.77	3
(Netherlands) Raymond van Barneveld 96.99	6
(Netherlands) Ron Meulenkamp 82.94	1
(Germany) René Eidams 76.99	5
(England) Joey Palfreyman 79.30	6
(Belgium) Dimitri Van den Bergh 102.94	2
(England) Ronnie Baxter 105.93	6
(England) Mark Walsh 86.07	0
(England) Lee Palfreyman 96.97	6
(England) Barry Lynn 77.19	0
(England) Andy Hamilton 79.81	6
(England) Dean Winstanley 90.13	6
(England) Matt Padgett 79.83	1
(England) Wayne Jones 84.92	6
(Germany) Tomas Seyler 76.75	3
(Sweden) Magnus Caris 87.93	2
(Republic of Ireland) Glenn Spearing 87.72	6

Second round (best of 11 legs); 1 February
1	(Netherlands) Michael van Gerwen 101.63	6
(Netherlands) Leon de Geus 89.57	2
16	(England) Kevin Painter 90.56	3
(England) Terry Jenkins 98.61	6
8	(England) Steve Beaton 87.19	4
(Netherlands) Jelle Klaasen 88.35	6
9	(England) Wes Newton 89.56	6
(Netherlands) Dirk van Duijvenbode 90.69	5
5	(Belgium) Kim Huybrechts 86.52	6
(England) Michael Smith 84.38	3
12	(Canada) John Part 94.31	6
(Netherlands) Dick van Dijk 81.15	2
4	(Northern Ireland) Brendan Dolan 94.82	2
(England) Justin Pipe 98.08	6
13	(Australia) Paul Nicholson 89.11	6
(England) Stuart Kellett 91.87	5
2	(England) Dave Chisnall 95.73	2
(Netherlands) Raymond van Barneveld 98.07	6
15	(England) Adrian Lewis 94.01	6
(England) Joey Palfreyman 83.63	3
7	(England) Jamie Caven 87.13	4
(England) Ronnie Baxter 97.93	6
10	(England) Mervyn King 100.20	6
(England) Lee Palfreyman 86.04	0
6	(Scotland) Robert Thornton 92.66	6
(England) Andy Hamilton 89.55	3
11	(England) Ian White 92.01	6
(England) Dean Winstanley 96.72	5
3	(Scotland) Peter Wright 81.00	4
(England) Wayne Jones 85.08	6
14	(Scotland) Gary Anderson 108.65	6
(Republic of Ireland) Glenn Spearing 87.67	0

Third round (best of 11 legs); 2 February
1	(Netherlands) van Gerwen 94.92	6
(England) Jenkins 92.20	5
(Netherlands) Klaasen 96.27	6
9	(England) Newton 86.37	4
5	(Belgium) Huybrechts 98.63	2
12	(Canada) Part 92.95	6
(England) Pipe 91.78	6
13	(Australia) Nicholson 87.28	4
(Netherlands) van Barneveld 102.35	6
15	(England) Lewis 98.03	2
(England) Baxter 91.70	6
10	(England) King 91.77	5
6	(Scotland) Thornton 100.85	3
11	(England) White 104.30	6
(England) Jones 92.37	4
14	(Scotland) Anderson 95.62	6

Quarter-finals (best of 11 legs); 2 February
1	(Netherlands) van Gerwen 97.23	5
(Netherlands) Klaasen 95.16	6
12	(Canada) Part 85.67	3
(England) Pipe 96.09	6
(Netherlands) van Barneveld 92.21	2
(England) Baxter 94.86	6
11	(England) White 93.81	4
14	(Scotland) Anderson 90.32	6

Semi-finals (best of 11 legs); 2 February
(Netherlands) Klaasen 91.89	5
(England) Pipe 92.11	6
(England) Baxter 95.48	4
14	(Scotland) Anderson 101.01	6

Final (best of 11 legs); 2 February
(England) Pipe 87.15	5
14	(Scotland) Anderson 90.05	6
