= Glenn Spearing =

Personal information
- Nickname: The Honey Monster
- Born: 1 June 1985 (age 41) Republic of Ireland
- Home town: Neilstown, Dublin, Ireland

Sport
- Sport: Darts
- Playing since: 2005
- Darts: 21 Gram Kongs
- Laterality: Right-handed
- Walk-on music: "Sugar, Sugar" by The Archies

Organisation (see split in darts)
- BDO: 2010-2014
- PDC: 2014–2015

WDF major events – best performances
- World Masters: Last 48: 2012

PDC premier events – best performances
- UK Open: Last 128: 2014

Other tournament wins
- Years
INDO Galway	2013
INDO Kilkenny	2013
INDO Mayo	2013
INDO Rathkeale	2013
Ireland National Championships	2013
Ireland Players Championship	2012, 2013, 2013

Glenn Spearing (born 1 June 1985) is an Irish former professional darts player. He competed in Professional Darts Corporation events.

== Career ==
Spearing was a prolific winner of Irish darts tournaments in 2012 and 2013 as he picked up eight titles during that time. In 2014, he entered Qualifying School in an attempt to join the PDC circuit full-time, coming closest on the final day when he lost in the last 32 to Joe Murnan. For competing he earned PDPA associate member status which gave him entry into UK Open and European Tour qualifiers. Spearing qualified for the German Darts Championship and beat Magnus Caris 6–2, before being whitewashed 6–0 by Gary Anderson in the last 32 which represents his deepest run in a PDC event to date. Spearing also qualified for the UK Open for the time, but lost 5–2 to Antonio Alcinas in the first round.
