= 2014 Gibraltar Darts Trophy =

Tournament information
- Dates: 27–29 June 2014
- Venue: Victoria Stadium
- Location: Gibraltar
- Country: Gibraltar
- Organisation(s): PDC
- Format: Legs
- Prize fund: £100,000
- Winner's share: £20,000

Champion(s)
- (England) James Wade

The 2014 Gibraltar Darts Trophy was the fifth of eight PDC European Tour events on the 2014 PDC Pro Tour. The tournament took place at the Victoria Stadium in Gibraltar, between 27 and 29 June 2014. It featured a field of 48 players and £100,000 in prize money, with £20,000 going to the winner.

James Wade won his first European Tour title by beating Steve Beaton 6–4 in the final.

== Prize money ==
Stage (num. of players)		Prize money
Winner	(1)	£20,000
Runner-up	(1)	£8,000
Semi-finalists	(2)	£4,000
Quarter-finalists	(4)	£3,000
Third round losers	(8)	£2,000
Second round losers	(16)	£1,250
First round losers	(16)	£1,000
Total	£100,000	

== Qualification and format ==
The top 16 players from the PDC ProTour Order of Merit on 19 May 2014 automatically qualified for the event. The remaining 32 places went to players from three qualifying events - 20 from the UK Qualifier (held in Crawley on 23 May), eight from the European Qualifier and four from the Host Nation Qualifier (both held at the venue the day before the event started).

The following players took part in the tournament:

Top 16
1. (Netherlands) Michael van Gerwen (second round)
2. (Scotland) Gary Anderson (quarter-finals)
3. (Northern Ireland) Brendan Dolan (third round)
4. (Scotland) Robert Thornton (third round)
5. (England) Phil Taylor (second round)
6. (England) Dave Chisnall (third round)
7. (Scotland) Peter Wright (second round)
8. (Belgium) Kim Huybrechts (quarter-finals)
9. (England) Ian White (third round)
10. (England) Steve Beaton (runner-up)
11. (England) Mervyn King (second round)
12. (England) Jamie Caven (third round)
13. (England) Adrian Lewis (quarter-finals)
14. (Australia) Simon Whitlock (semi-finals)
15. (England) Justin Pipe (third round)
16. (England) Andy Hamilton (second round)

UK Qualifier
- (England) Wes Newton (second round)
- (England) Kevin Painter (second round)
- (England) Michael Smith (semi-finals)
- (England) Johnny Haines (third round)
- (England) Pete Dyos (second round)
- (England) Adam Hunt (quarter-finals)
- (England) Andy Parsons (second round)
- (England) James Wade (winner)
- (Northern Ireland) Daryl Gurney (second round)
- (England) Dean Winstanley (second round)
- (England) Matt Clark (first round)
- (England) Andy Smith (first round)
- (Wales) Richie Burnett (first round)
- (England) Jason Lovett (first round)
- (England) Ben Ward (first round)
- (England) James Hubbard (second round)
- (Scotland) John Henderson (second round)
- (England) Denis Ovens (first round)
- (England) Mark Walsh (first round)
- (Wales) Mark Webster (first round)

European Qualifier
- (Belgium) Ronny Huybrechts (first round)
- (Spain) Antonio Alcinas (first round)
- (Belgium) Dimitri Van den Bergh (second round)
- (Netherlands) Vincent van der Voort (first round)
- (Germany) Jyhan Artut (second round)
- (Netherlands) Ryan de Vreede (first round)
- (Netherlands) Benito van de Pas (third round)
- (Netherlands) Gino Vos (first round)

Host Nation Qualifier
- (Gibraltar) Henry Zapata (first round)
- (Gibraltar) Antony Lopez (first round)
- (Gibraltar) Manuel Vilerio (first round)
- (Gibraltar) Dyson Parody (second round)

== Draw ==
First round (best of 11 legs); 27 June
(Spain) Antonio Alcinas 85.30	0
(Netherlands) Benito van de Pas 104.86	6
(England) James Wade 88.56	6
(Netherlands) Gino Vos 82.99	3
(England) Ben Ward 79.27	5
(Germany) Jyhan Artut 84.52	6
(Wales) Richie Burnett 99.70	1
(England) Wes Newton 97.24	6
(England) Michael Smith 93.60	6
(England) Andy Smith 89.89	5
(England) Matt Clark 83.37	4
(Scotland) John Henderson 86.82	6
(Gibraltar) Antony Lopez 76.86	0
(Northern Ireland) Daryl Gurney 104.86	6
(England) Dean Winstanley 87.55	6
(Gibraltar) Manuel Vilerio 65.58	0
(Gibraltar) Henry Zapata 73.47	0
(Gibraltar) Dyson Parody 90.18	6
(England) Pete Dyos 85.05	6
(England) Jason Lovett 75.31	3
(England) Denis Ovens 84.74	4
(England) Johnny Haines 85.94	6
(England) Andy Parsons 84.54	6
(England) Mark Walsh 85.28	4
(Belgium) Ronny Huybrechts 87.10	4
(England) James Hubbard 91.27	6
(England) Adam Hunt 86.51	6
(Netherlands) Ryan de Vreede 85.29	3
(Wales) Mark Webster 86.13	4
(Belgium) Dimitri Van den Bergh 92.12	6
(Netherlands) Vincent van der Voort 97.14	3
(England) Kevin Painter 102.31	6

Second round (best of 11 legs); 28 June
1	(Netherlands) Michael van Gerwen 103.91	5
(Netherlands) Benito van de Pas 106.72	6
16	(England) Andy Hamilton 88.25	3
(England) James Wade 96.07	6
8	(Belgium) Kim Huybrechts 96.71	6
(Germany) Jyhan Artut 86.38	1
9	(England) Ian White 93.04	6
(England) Wes Newton 90.28	4
5	(England) Phil Taylor 93.59	4
(England) Michael Smith 97.02	6
12	(England) Jamie Caven 90.62	6
(Scotland) John Henderson 81.25	3
4	(Scotland) Robert Thornton 91.87	6
(Northern Ireland) Daryl Gurney 87.56	4
13	(England) Adrian Lewis 100.44	6
(England) Dean Winstanley 95.34	5
2	(Scotland) Gary Anderson 93.12	6
(Gibraltar) Dyson Parody 93.05	2
15	(England) Justin Pipe 94.98	6
(England) Pete Dyos 79.19	4
7	(Scotland) Peter Wright 96.10	4
(England) Johnny Haines 98.54	6
10	(England) Steve Beaton 84.66	6
(England) Andy Parsons 81.97	3
6	(England) Dave Chisnall 94.93	6
(England) James Hubbard 92.09	3
11	(England) Mervyn King 85.88	3
(England) Adam Hunt 82.76	6
3	(Northern Ireland) Brendan Dolan 94.99	6
(Belgium) Dimitri Van den Bergh 97.50	4
14	(Australia) Simon Whitlock 101.22	6
(England) Kevin Painter 90.97	2

Third round (best of 11 legs); 29 June
(Netherlands) van de Pas 97.35	5
(England) Wade 96.98	6
8	(Belgium) K. Huybrechts 104.24	6
9	(England) White 101.77	4
(England) M. Smith 94.39	6
12	(England) Caven 87.29	3
4	(Scotland) Thornton 94.62	0
13	(England) Lewis 108.65	6
2	(Scotland) Anderson 100.47	6
15	(England) Pipe 87.12	1
(England) Haines 84.82	5
10	(England) Beaton 85.26	6
6	(England) Chisnall 86.84	5
(England) Hunt 86.41	6
3	(Northern Ireland) Dolan 90.20	3
14	(Australia) Whitlock 96.53	6

Quarter-finals (best of 11 legs); 29 June
(England) Wade 88.83	6
8	(Belgium) K. Huybrechts 95.48	4
(England) M. Smith 98.82	6
13	(England) Lewis 96.34	3
2	(Scotland) Anderson 79.58	5
10	(England) Beaton 84.92	6
(England) Hunt 89.78	2
14	(Australia) Whitlock 94.63	6

Semi-finals (best of 11 legs); 29 June
(England) Wade 94.73	6
(England) M. Smith 87.23	2
10	(England) Beaton 90.52	6
14	(Australia) Whitlock 88.74	4

Final (best of 11 legs); 29 June
(England) Wade 89.98	6
10	(England) Beaton 89.29	4
