= Tony Newell =

English darts player

Personal information
- Full name: Anthony Newell
- Nickname: The Bear
- Born: 5 April 1982 (age 44) Kendal, Cumbria, England

Sport
- Sport: Darts
- Darts: 26g Target Gen5 Phil Taylor
- Laterality: Right-handed
- Walk-on music: Theme from The A-Team

Organisation (see split in darts)
- PDC: 2014–2024

PDC premier events – best performances
- UK Open: Last 64: 2016

Anthony Newell (born 5 April 1982) is an English former professional darts player who competed in Professional Darts Corporation events.

== Career ==
Newell earned a PDC Tour Card in 2014 and 2016, and qualified for the 2016 UK Open, but lost in the third round to Adrian Lewis.

In 2021 he announced that he intended to make a comeback to the sport.
