= Stefan Stoyke =

German darts player

Personal information
- Nickname: The Calm
- Born: March 23, 1972 (age 54) Barßel, Germany
- Home town: Barßel, Germany

Sport
- Sport: Darts
- Playing since: 2010
- Darts: 26g
- Laterality: Right-handed

Organisation (see split in darts)
- PDC: 2010–2018

Stefan Stoyke (born 23 March 1972) is a former German professional darts player currently playing in Professional Darts Corporation events.

Nicknamed "The Calm", Stoyke narrowly missed out on qualifying for the 2017 PDC World Darts Championship, when he lost the German qualifier to Dragutin Horvat.

In 2017, he qualified for the 2017 German Darts Masters, where he lost 6–3 in the first round to Raymond van Barneveld. In 2018, he qualified as a German Superleague qualifier for the 2018 German Darts Masters in the 2018 World Series of Darts.
