= 2010 World Cricket Championship (darts) =

Darts World Cricket Championship

Tournament information
- Dates: 26 June 2010
- Venue: Tropicana Hotel
- Location: Paradise, Nevada
- Country: United States
- Organisation(s): PDC
- Format: Best of 5 Legs
- Prize fund: £15,000
- Winner's share: £4,000

Champion(s)
- (England) Phil Taylor

The 2010 Darts World Cricket Championship was the first and only darts Professional Darts Corporation tournament involving darts cricket. It took place on 26 June 2010 as the first event in the 2010 World Series of Darts Festival at the Tropicana Hotel in Las Vegas.

Phil Taylor defeated Mark Walsh in the final to claim his first and only world darts cricket title.

== Prize money ==
Stage	Prize money (Total-£15,000)
Winner	£4,000
Runner Up	£2,000
Semi Final	£900
Quarter Final	£450
Fifth Round	£225
Fourth Round	£125
Third Round	£50

== Draw ==
Last 64 players shown in bracket. In total there were about 140 entries.

Second Round
(United States)	Nico Depaynos	3
(United States)	Jim Newman	1
(England)	Peter Manley	0
(England)	Ronnie Baxter	3
(England)	Adrian Gray	3
(Canada)	Stuart Brown	1
(Wales)	Barrie Bates	3
(England)	Steve Maish	0
(United States)	Ray Carver	2
(England)	James Wade	3
(England)	Andy Hamilton	3
(England)	Steve Grubb	0
(England)	Adrian Lewis	1
(England)	Mark Walsh	3
(England)	Joe Cullen	0
(Netherlands)	Vincent van der Voort	3
(England)	Wes Newton	3
(England)	Alex Roy	2
(Scotland)	Peter Wright	1
(United States)	Larry Butler	3
(England)	Steve Brown	3
(England)	Jamie Caven	2
(England)	Tony Eccles	3
(United States)	Ryan van der Weit	0
(Canada)	Gerry Convery	1
(United States)	Darin Young	3
(Republic of Ireland)	Aodhagan O'Neill	0
(Canada)	Bob Sinnaeve	3
(England)	Matt Clark	3
(England)	Justin Pipe	1
(England)	Danny Wood	0
(England)	Denis Ovens	3
(Scotland)	Chris Loudon	1
(England)	Chris Thompson	3
(United States)	Frank Hernandez	3
(Canada)	Jeff Noble	2
(Canada)	Ross Snook	1
(England)	Mark Dudbridge	3
(England)	Darren Johnson	0
(England)	Ian White	3
(England)	Alan Tabern	3
(England)	Mark Hylton	0
(Republic of Ireland)	Mick McGowan	0
(Canada)	Shawn Brenneman	3
(Netherlands)	Co Stompé	3
(United States)	Isen Veljic	1
(United States)	Chris White	1
(England)	Colin Lloyd	3
(England)	Kirk Shepherd	3
(Canada)	Dan Olson	2
(England)	Phil Taylor	3
(England)	Andy Fordham	0
(England)	Rick Davis	0
(Wales)	Richie Burnett	3
(England)	Scott Rand	2
(England)	Kevin McDine	3
(United States)	Dieter Schutsch	3
(United States)	Gregory Coburn	0
(England)	Andy Jenkins	3
(Australia)	Simon Whitlock	2
(England)	Kevin Painter	2
(England)	Steve Beaton	3
(Canada)	Ken MacNeil	3
(England)	Joe Custer	0

Third round
(United States)	Nico Depaynos	0
(England)	Ronnie Baxter	3
(England)	Adrian Gray	1
(Wales)	Barrie Bates	3
(England)	James Wade	1
(England)	Andy Hamilton	3
(England)	Mark Walsh	3
(Netherlands)	Vincent van der Voort	0
(England)	Wes Newton	3
(United States)	Larry Bulter	1
(England)	Steve Brown	3
(England)	Tony Eccles	2
(United States)	Darin Young	3
(Canada)	Bob Sinnaeve	1
(England)	Matt Clark	3
(England)	Denis Ovens	0
(England)	Chris Thompson	3
(United States)	Frank Hernandez	1
(England)	Mark Dudbridge	3
(England)	Ian White	0
(England)	Alan Tabern	1
(Canada)	Shawn Brenneman	3
(Netherlands)	Co Stompé	3
(England)	Colin Lloyd	0
(England)	Kirk Shepherd	0
(England)	Phil Taylor	3
(Wales)	Richie Burnett	3
(England)	Kevin McDine	0
(United States)	Dieter Schutsch	0
(England)	Andy Jenkins	3
(England)	Steve Beaton	3
(Canada)	Ken MacNeil	0

Fourth round
(England)	Ronnie Baxter	3
(Wales)	Barrie Bates	0
(England)	Andy Hamilton	2
(England)	Mark Walsh	3
(England)	Wes Newton	0
(England)	Steve Brown	3
(United States)	Darin Young	3
(England)	Matt Clark	2
(England)	Chris Thompson	1
(England)	Mark Dudbridge	3
(Canada)	Shawn Brenneman	1
(Netherlands)	Co Stompé	3
(England)	Phil Taylor	3
(Wales)	Richie Burnett	1
(England)	Andy Jenkins	2
(England)	Steve Beaton	3

Quarter-finals
(England)	Ronnie Baxter	1
(England)	Mark Walsh	3
(England)	Steve Brown	2
(United States)	Darin Young	3
(England)	Mark Dudbridge	3
(Netherlands)	Co Stompé	1
(England)	Phil Taylor	3
(England)	Steve Beaton	1

Semi-finals
(England)	Mark Walsh	3
(United States)	Darin Young	1
(England)	Mark Dudbridge	0
(England)	Phil Taylor	3

Final
(England)	Mark Walsh	2
(England)	Phil Taylor	3

== See also ==
- World Series of Darts Festival
