= 1997 Denmark Open darts =

Denmark Open

Tournament information
- Dates: 1997
- Country: Denmark
- Organisation(s): BDO, WDF, DDU

Champion(s)
- (Netherlands) Raymond van Barneveld

1997 Denmark Open is a darts tournament that took place in Denmark in 1997.

== Results ==
Round	Player
Winner	(Netherlands) Raymond van Barneveld
Final	(England) Ronnie Baxter
Semi-finals	(Netherlands) Roland Scholten
Semi-finals	(England) Matt Clark
Quarter-finals	(England) Martin Adams
Quarter-finals	(England) Mike Gregory
Quarter-finals	(England) Paul Williams
Quarter-finals	(England) Colin Monk
Last 16	(Germany) Andreas Krockel
Last 16	(England) Andy Jenkins
Last 16	(England) Les Fitton
Last 16	(Wales) Richie Burnett
Last 16	(Germany) Colin Rice
Last 16	(England) Robbie Widdows
Last 16	(Wales) Marshall James
Last 16	(Scotland) Les Wallace
