= World Series of Darts Festival =

Series of darts tournaments held in June 2010

Tournament information
- Dates: 26–30 June 2010
- Venue: Tropicana Hotel
- Location: Las Vegas, Nevada
- Country: United States
- Organisation(s): PDC
- Format: Legs
- Prize fund: $200,000

Champion(s)
- Phil Taylor (ENG) (WCC champion); Phil Taylor (ENG) (US Open champion); Gary Anderson (SCO) (LVPC1 champion); Co Stompé (NED) (LVPC2 champion); John Part (CAN) (NADC champion)

The World Series of Darts Festival (officially the Tropicana World Series of Darts Festival) was a series of five professional darts competitions organised by the Professional Darts Corporation (PDC) in the Tropicana Ballroom of the Tropicana Hotel, in Las Vegas, Nevada, from 26 to 30 June 2010. It was established to replace the Las Vegas Desert Classic, and featured the 501-point and cricket formats. There was a £200,000 prize fund divided between all five events.

The World Cricket Championship (WCC) was won by Phil Taylor, the world number one, who defeated Mark Walsh in the final. Taylor went on to beat Denis Ovens for the PDC US Open Players Championship (USOPC). The Las Vegas Players Championship 1 (LVPC1) was won by Gary Anderson over Simon Whitlock, with Co Stompé taking the Las Vegas Players Championship 2 (LVPC2) from James Wade. John Part defeated Darin Young to win the North American Darts Championship (NADC).

== Overview ==
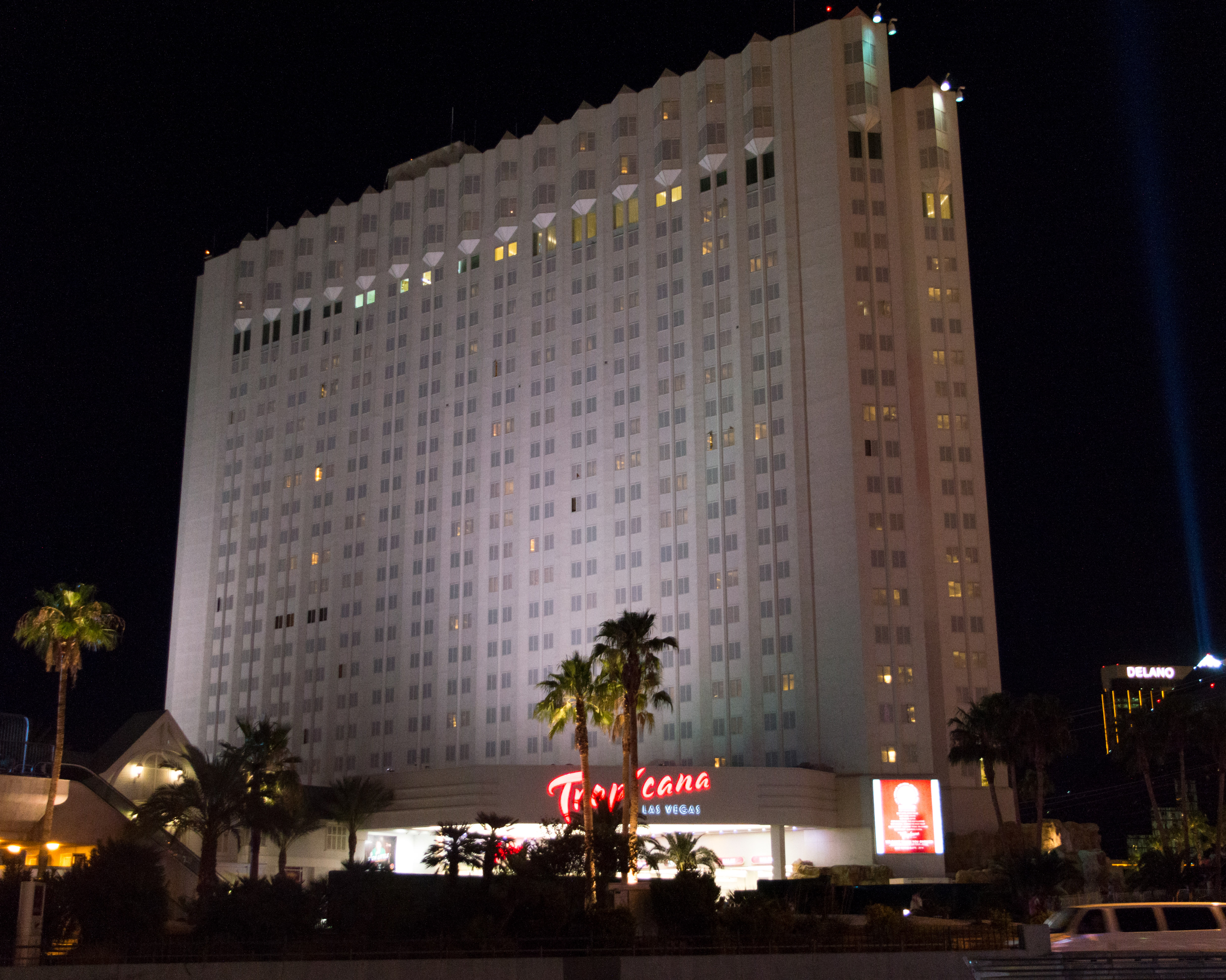
The Tropicana Las Vegas, where the festival took place

The World Series of Darts Festival was a series of five professional darts tournaments organised by the Professional Darts Corporation (PDC) and took place in the Tropicana Ballroom of the Tropicana Hotel, in Las Vegas, Nevada, between 26 and 30 June 2010, in lieu of the Las Vegas Desert Classic. The five events were the World Cricket Championship (WCC), the PDC US Open Players Championship (USOPC), the Las Vegas Players Championship 1 (LVPC1), the Las Vegas Players Championship 2 (LVPC2) and the North American Darts Championship (NADC).

All five competitions were part of the 2010 North American Order of Merit from which the first and second ranked players were invited to the 2011 PDC World Darts Championship. The three Players Championship events were counted towards both the PDC Order of Merit and the Players Championship Order of Merit and were the last such competitions prior to the qualifiers cut-off date for the World Matchplay.

A total of 155 entrants composed of 82 from the Professional Dart Players Association and 73 from North America played in the World Series of Darts Festival. Each of the five tournaments began at 12:00 local time and were contested to a different length. (Note: Two disciplines of darts were played in the competitions, 501-point matches and cricket games.) WCC games were best-of-five legs with the remaining four competitions being best-of-eleven legs. The NADC saw 80 participants from Canada and the United States with eight seeds from the top-ranked eight players on the PDC Order of Merit. Seeds were not used for the WCC but were for the three Players Championship events.

=== Prize money ===
The prize money for each of the five competitions is shown below. A total of £200,000 was divided between the five tournaments with a rolling nine-dart finish prize of £400 per PDC Pro Tour competition.

World Cricket Championship

- Champion: £4,000
- Runner-up: £2,000
- Semi-final: (×2): £900
- Quarter-finals (×4): £450
- Last 16 (×8): £225
- Last 32 (×16): £125
- Last 64 (×32): £50
- Total: £15,000

Players Championship events

- Champion: £6,000
- Runner-up: £3,000
- Semi-final (×2): £1,500
- Quarter-final (×4): £1,000
- Last 16 (×8): £500
- Last 32 (×16): £300
- Last 64 (×32): £200
- Total: £31,600

North American Darts Championship

- Champion: £5,000
- Runner-up: £2,500
- Semi-final (×2): £1,250
- Quarter-final (×4): £700
- Last 16 (×8): £300
- Last 32 (×16): £200
- Last 64 (×32): £100
- Total: £22,000

== Tournament summary ==
The event began with the WCC on 26 June, which was the second of the ten non-ranking events on the 2010 calendar. Phil Taylor, the world number one, defeated Howard Meyers, Andy Fordham, Kirk Shepherd, Richie Burnett and Steve Beaton to reach the semi-finals, while Mark Walsh lost five only legs en route to beating Scott Kirchner, Adrian Lewis, Vincent van der Voort, Andy Hamilton and Ronnie Baxter to reach the same stage. Walsh beat Darin Young 3–1 for the first final spot and Taylor took the second with a 3–0 whitewash of Mark Dudbridge. Walsh won the first two legs before Taylor took the next two to equalise at 2–2. In the final leg, Taylor secured the 20 bed before Walsh took the 19, 18, 17 and 15 beds. Taylor subsequently won the match 3–2 on two bullseye rings. Taylor said he was "really happy" to win due to the difficulty of playing the cricket format but commented it "really makes you think and it's a great leveller."

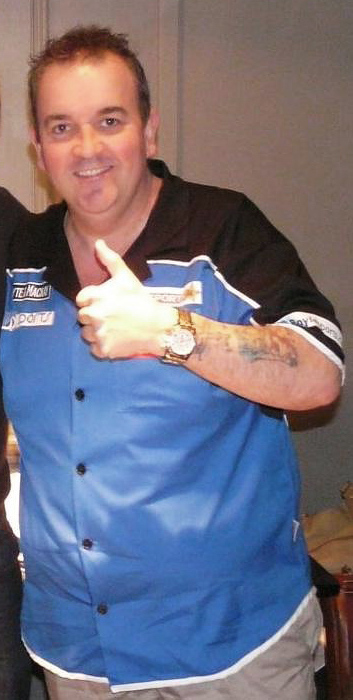
Phil Taylor won two of the five tournaments played at the festival

The second tournament was the USOPC on 27 June, which was the 27th of the 45 events in the 2010 PDC Pro Tour. Taylor defeated Kevin McDine, Paul Lim, Joe Cullen, Nigel Heydon, Walsh and James Wade, as Denis Ovens beat Dieter Schutsch, Shintaro Hirai, Ken MacNeil, Steve Hine, Terry Jenkins and Jelle Klaasen to set up the final; Ovens played his fourth final of the season. Taylor won the first two legs and Ovens the third on the double 19 ring. Finishes on the double 18 and 20 rings put Taylor three legs ahead before Ovens used Taylor's miss on the double 16 ring in leg six to complete an 108 checkout on the double 20 ring to be 4–2 behind. Taylor took two of the next three legs with finishes on the double 8 and 20 rings to claim a 6–3 victory and a second successive tournament win. Colin Lloyd won £2,000 prize money for achieving a nine-dart finish in his 6–3-second round victory over Dave Switzer, the third of his professional career.

The third competition was the LVPC1 contested on 28 June, which was the 28th of the 45 competitions in the 2010 PDC Pro Tour. Gary Anderson qualified for the final with victories over Mark Hylton, Chris Loudon, Mark Webster, Steve Maish, Lim and Lloyd, while Simon Whitlock defeated Sean Smyth, Donny Joe, Colin Monk, Ovens, MacNeil and Chris Thompson. After Whitlock won the opening leg on the double 10 ring, Anderson took three legs in a row to lead 3–1. Both players shared the next two legs before Whitlock won legs seven and eight to tie at 4–4. Finishes on the double 20 and 8 rings gave Anderson a 6–4 victory. It was Anderson's third tournament win of the season, earning a provisional top 16 spot in the PDC Order of Merit, with Paul Nicholson at risk of failing to qualify for the Players Championship Finals with Heydon ahead of him in its Order of Merit.

The LVPC2 played on 29 June was the fourth event and the 29th of the 45 tournaments in the 2010 PDC Pro Tour. Co Stompé reached the final with wins over Edwin Martin, Wayne Mardle, Lewis, Beaton, Klaasen and Matt Clark, joined by Wade who beat MacNeil, Tony Randell, Robert Thornton, Van der Voort, Whitlock and Lloyd. Wade won the first leg before Stompe took the following four with two maximum scores for a 4–1 lead. He took the next two legs to go one leg behind before Stompe secured two more legs to win 6–3. It was Stompe's first PDC Pro Tour event win since he made his PDC debut in 2008, and his second of three titles following the 2008 German Darts Championship and preceding the 2010 PDC World Cup of Darts alongside Raymond van Barneveld. Nicholson reached the third round to reclaim 16th place in the PDC Order of Merit and automatically qualified for the World Matchplay.

The last tournament was the NADC on 30 June, the third of the ten non-ranking competitions in the 2010 season. Wins over Alvin Martin, Greg Lewis, Shawn Brenneman, Chris White and Gary Mawson earned John Part a place in the final opposite Young, who defeated Eddie Lawrence, Dan Lauby, Joe, Nico Depaynos and Larry Butler. Part took three of the first four legs on checkouts of 68, 111 and 84. Young took legs five and six to equalise before Part took two more legs. Part missed the double 20 ring to complete an 108 checkout for victory and Young struck the double 5 ring to win leg nine. Part made a maximum score and hit the double 4 ring to win the tournament by 6–4. Part called it "an emotional day and not easy to play" but felt he had played better than in previous tournaments.

== Results ==
Tournament results
No.	Date	Venue	Tournament	Winner	Score	Runner-up
1	26 June	Tropicana Ballroom, Tropicana Hotel, Las Vegas, Nevada	Darts World Cricket Championship	Phil Taylor (ENG)	3–2	Mark Walsh (ENG)
2	27 June	Tropicana Ballroom, Tropicana Hotel, Las Vegas, Nevada	US Open Players Championship	Phil Taylor (ENG)	6–3	Denis Ovens (ENG)
3	28 June	Tropicana Ballroom, Tropicana Hotel, Las Vegas, Nevada	Las Vegas Players Championship 1	Gary Anderson (SCO)	6–4	Simon Whitlock (AUS)
4	29 June	Tropicana Ballroom, Tropicana Hotel, Las Vegas, Nevada	Las Vegas Players Championship 2	Co Stompé (NED)	6–3	James Wade (ENG)
5	30 June	Tropicana Ballroom, Tropicana Hotel, Las Vegas, Nevada	North American Darts Championship	John Part (CAN)	6–4	Darin Young (USA)

== Brackets ==
Numbers given to the left of players' names show the seedings for four of the five tournaments. N/A indicates the competitor was not seeded for their competition. Players in bold denote match winners from the quarter-finals to the final of each event.

=== World Cricket Championship ===
The WCC featured no seeds and best-of-five leg meetings.

Quarter-finals
**Mark Walsh (ENG)**	**3**
Ronnie Baxter (ENG)	1
**Darin Young (USA)**	**3**
Steve Brown (ENG)	2
**Mark Dudbridge (ENG)**	**3**
Co Stompé (NED)	1
Steve Beaton (ENG)	1
**Phil Taylor (ENG)**	**3**

Semi-finals
**(England) Mark Walsh**	**3**
(United States) Darin Young	1
(England) Mark Dudbridge	0
**(England) Phil Taylor**	**3**

Final
(England) Mark Walsh	2
**(England) Phil Taylor**	**3**

=== US Open Players Championship ===
The USOPC featured 32 seeds and best-of-11 leg games.

Quarter-finals
1	**Phil Taylor (ENG)**	**6**
8	Mark Walsh (ENG)	2
12	**James Wade (ENG)**	**6**
4	Adrian Lewis (ENG)	5
31	**Jelle Klaasen (NED)**	**6**
7	Gary Anderson (SCO)	3
14	**Denis Ovens (ENG)**	**6**
27	Terry Jenkins (ENG)	4

Semi-finals
1	**(England) Phil Taylor**	**6**
12	(England) James Wade	1
31	(Netherlands) Jelle Klaasen	3
14	**(England) Denis Ovens**	**6**

Final
1	**(England) Phil Taylor**	**6**
14	(England) Denis Ovens	3

=== Las Vegas Players Championship 1 ===
The first LVPC had 32 seeds and best-of-11 legs matches.

Quarter-finals
N/A	**Chris Thompson (ENG)**	**6**
1	Phil Taylor (ENG)	5
4	**Simon Whitlock (AUS)**	**6**
N/A	Ken MacNeil (CAN)	5
7	**Gary Anderson (SCO)**	**6**
N/A	Paul Lim (SIN)	2
6	**Colin Lloyd (ENG)**	**6**
14	Ronnie Baxter (ENG)	2

Semi-finals
N/A	(England) Chris Thompson	2
4	**(Australia) Simon Whitlock**	**6**
7	**(Scotland) Gary Anderson**	**6**
6	(England) Colin Lloyd	2

Final
4	(Australia) Simon Whitlock	4
7	**(Scotland) Gary Anderson**	**6**

=== Las Vegas Players Championship 2 ===
The second LVPC featured 32 seeds and best-of-11 games.

Quarter-finals
N/A	**Matt Clark (ENG)**	**6**
1	Phil Taylor (ENG)	5
29	**Co Stompé (NED)**	**6**
28	Jelle Klaasen (NED)	4
10	**James Wade (ENG)**	**6**
2	Simon Whitlock (AUS)	4
6	**Colin Lloyd (ENG)**	**6**
3	Wes Newton (ENG)	4

Semi-finals
N/A	(England) Matt Clark	0
29	**(Netherlands) Co Stompé**	**6**
10	**(England) James Wade**	**6**
6	(England) Colin Lloyd	3

Final
29	**(Netherlands) Co Stompé**	**6**
10	(England) James Wade	3

=== North American Darts Championship ===
The NADC featured 8 seeds and best-of-11 leg matches.

Quarter-finals
1	**John Part (CAN)**	**6**
8	Chris White (USA)	4
4	**Gary Mawson (USA)**	**6**
5	Scott Burnett (USA)	4
2	**Darin Young (USA)**	**6**
N/A	Nick Depaynos (USA)	3
N/A	**Larry Butler (USA)**	**6**
N/A	Paul Lim (SIN)	5

Semi-finals
1	**(Canada) John Part**	**6**
4	(United States) Gary Mawson	5
2	**(United States) Darin Young**	**6**
N/A	(United States) Larry Butler	5

Final
1	**(Canada) John Part**	**6**
2	(United States) Darin Young	4
