= 1996 BDO World Darts Championship =

Tournament information
- Dates: 1–7 January 1996
- Venue: Lakeside Country Club
- Location: Frimley Green, Surrey
- Country: England, United Kingdom
- Organisation(s): BDO
- Format: Sets; Final – best of 11
- Prize fund: £150,000
- Winner's share: £36,000
- High checkout: 161 (Wales) Richie Burnett (England) Martin Adams

Champion(s)
- (England) Steve Beaton

The 1996 BDO World Professional Darts Championship (known for sponsorship reasons as the 1996 Embassy World Darts Championship) was held from 1–7 January 1996 at the Lakeside Country Club in Frimley Green, Surrey and was won by the number six seed Steve Beaton. Beaton, who suffered a first round loss in the previous two World Championships as the number one seed, defeated Co Stompé, 1994 champion John Part, and future champions Martin Adams and Andy Fordham before beating defending champion Richie Burnett 6–3 in sets in the final.

== Seeds ==
1. (Wales) Richie Burnett
2. (England) Andy Fordham
3. (England) Martin Adams
4. (England) Mike Gregory
5. (Netherlands) Raymond van Barneveld
6. (England) Steve Beaton
7. (England) Colin Monk
8. (England) Kevin Painter

== Prize money ==
The prize money was £145,200.

Champion: £36,000
Runner-Up: £18,000
Semi-Finalists (2): £8,400
Quarter-Finalists (4): £4,200
Last 16 (8): £3,200
Last 32 (16): £2,000

There was also a 9 Dart Checkout prize of £52,000, along with a High Checkout prize of £1,600.

== The results ==
First Round (best of 5 sets)
1	(Wales) Richie Burnett (93.75)	3
(Australia) Wayne Weening (85.38)	0
(Netherlands) Roland Scholten (83.79)	3
(Wales) Mark Salmon (78.84)	0
8	(England) Kevin Painter (83.97)	2
(England) Ronnie Baxter (85.56)	3
(Scotland) Alan Brown (84.90)	3
(Germany) Andreas Krockel (82.20)	1
5	(Netherlands) Raymond van Barneveld (94.23)	3
(Belgium) Leo Laurens (86.10)	0
(England) Matt Clark (86.85)	3
(England) Paul Hogan (87.21)	2
4	(England) Mike Gregory (86.73)	0
(Scotland) Les Wallace (95.46)	3
(England) Ian Brand (92.40)	3
(Scotland) Bob Taylor (70.89)	0
2	(England) Andy Fordham (88.74)	3
(England) Chris Mason (79.74)	0
(England) Andy Jenkins (79.23)	3
(Belgium) Bruno Raes (72.99)	0
7	(England) Colin Monk (79.11)	3
(Republic of Ireland) Charlie Gaile (77.61)	0
(Denmark) Per Skau (92.97)	3
(Wales) Eric Burden (85.50)	0
6	(England) Steve Beaton (95.10)	3
(Netherlands) Co Stompé (90.78)	0
(Canada) John Part (84.90)	3
(England) Paul Williams (86.31)	2
3	(England) Martin Adams (93.57)	3
(Australia) Darren Webster (88.26)	1
(Northern Ireland) Geoff Wylie (89.28)	3
(United States) Roger Carter (85.86)	1

Second Round (best of 5 sets)
1	(Wales) Richie Burnett (87.99)	3
(Netherlands) Roland Scholten (81.12)	1
(England) Ronnie Baxter (95.97)	3
(Scotland) Alan Brown (86.55)	1
5	(Netherlands) Raymond van Barneveld (92.16)	1
(England) Matt Clark (95.04)	3
(Scotland) Les Wallace (96.93)	3
(England) Ian Brand (89.70)	0
2	(England) Andy Fordham (89.01)	3
(England) Andy Jenkins (89.25)	2
7	(England) Colin Monk (79.98)	3
(Denmark) Per Skau (79.68)	2
6	(England) Steve Beaton (97.44)	3
(Canada) John Part (89.19)	0
3	(England) Martin Adams (87.03)	3
(Northern Ireland) Geoff Wylie (82.56)	2

Quarter-Finals (best of 7 sets)
1	(Wales) Richie Burnett (90.69)	4
(England) Ronnie Baxter (92.88)	2
(England) Matt Clark (86.01)	1
(Scotland) Les Wallace (88.29)	4
2	(England) Andy Fordham (88.44)	4
7	(England) Colin Monk (81.84)	1
6	(England) Steve Beaton (99.48)	4
3	(England) Martin Adams (97.98)	1

Semi-Finals (best of 9 sets)
1	(Wales) Richie Burnett (90.66)	5
(Scotland) Les Wallace (87.81)	2
2	(England) Andy Fordham (93.87)	3
6	(England) Steve Beaton (92.52)	5

Final (best of 11 sets)
1	(Wales) Richie Burnett (88.05)	3
6	(England) Steve Beaton (90.27)	6
