= 2017 European Darts Grand Prix =

Tournament information
- Dates: 5–7 May 2017
- Venue: Glaspalast
- Location: Sindelfingen, Germany
- Organisation(s): Professional Darts Corporation (PDC)
- Format: Legs; First to 6 legs
- Prize fund: £135,000
- Winner's share: £25,000
- High checkout: 170 Jelle Klaasen

Champion(s)
- Peter Wright (SCO)

The 2017 European Darts Grand Prix was the fourth of twelve PDC European Tour events on the 2017 PDC Pro Tour. The tournament took place at Glaspalast, Sindelfingen, Germany, from 5 to 7 May 2017. It featured a field of 48 players and £135,000 in prize money, with £25,000 going to the winner.

Michael van Gerwen was the defending champion, after defeating Peter Wright 6–2 in the final of the 2016 tournament, but Wright sought revenge by defeating Van Gerwen 6–0 in the final.

== Prize money ==
This is how the prize money is divided:

Stage (num. of players)		Prize money
Winner	(1)	£25,000
Runner-up	(1)	£10,000
Semi-finalists	(2)	£6,000
Quarter-finalists	(4)	£4,000
Third round losers	(8)	£3,000
Second round losers	(16)	£2,000
First round losers	(16)	£1,000
Total	£135,000	

== Qualification and format ==
The top 16 players from the PDC ProTour Order of Merit on 27 April automatically qualified for the event and were seeded in the second round.

The remaining 32 places went to players from five qualifying events - 18 from the UK Qualifier (held in Wigan on 28 April), eight from the West/South European Qualifier, four from the Host Nation Qualifier (both held on 4 May), one from the Nordic & Baltic Qualifier (held on 17 March) and one from the East European Qualifier (held on 29 April).

The following players took part in the tournament:

Top 16
1. (Netherlands) Michael van Gerwen (runner-up)
2. (Scotland) Peter Wright (champion)
3. (Austria) Mensur Suljović (third round)
4. (Australia) Simon Whitlock (second round)
5. (England) Dave Chisnall (semi-finals)
6. (England) James Wade (second round)
7. (Belgium) Kim Huybrechts (third round)
8. (Netherlands) Benito van de Pas (quarter-finals)
9. (Wales) Gerwyn Price (third round)
10. (England) Alan Norris (second round)
11. (Netherlands) Jelle Klaasen (semi-finals)
12. (England) Ian White (second round)
13. (England) Michael Smith (second round)
14. (England) Joe Cullen (quarter-finals)
15. (Northern Ireland) Daryl Gurney (third round)
16. (Spain) Cristo Reyes (second round)

UK Qualifier
- (England) Stephen Bunting (first round)
- (England) Mervyn King (first round)
- (England) Steve West (third round)
- (England) Joe Murnan (second round)
- (England) Steve Beaton (first round)
- (England) James Wilson (first round)
- (England) Adrian Lewis (third round)
- (England) Chris Dobey (first round)
- (England) Paul Rowley (first round)
- (England) Rob Cross (quarter-finals)
- (England) Luke Woodhouse (first round)
- (Wales) Mark Webster (third round)
- (Republic of Ireland) Steve Lennon (first round)
- (Scotland) John Henderson (second round)
- (England) James Richardson (second round)
- (England) Matt Clark (second round)
- (Wales) Jonny Clayton (second round)
- (England) Keegan Brown (second round)

West/South European Qualifier
- (Netherlands) Ron Meulenkamp (first round)
- (Belgium) Dimitri Van den Bergh (second round)
- (Netherlands) Jeffrey de Graaf (first round)
- (Netherlands) Jermaine Wattimena (first round)
- (Netherlands) Jan Dekker (quarter-finals)
- (Netherlands) Christian Kist (first round)
- (Austria) Zoran Lerchbacher (first round)
- (Netherlands) Dirk van Duijvenbode (second round)

Home Nation Qualifier
- (Germany) Gabriel Clemens (first round)
- (Germany) Bernd Roith (first round)
- (Germany) René Berndt (first round)
- (Germany) Max Hopp (second round)

Nordic & Baltic Qualifier
- (Finland) Ulf Ceder (third round)

East European Qualifier
- (Poland) Krzysztof Ratajski (second round)

== Draw ==
First round (best of 11 legs); 5 May
(England) Keegan Brown 86.79	6
(Netherlands) Jeffrey de Graaf 85.86	4
(England) Steve Beaton 86.60	2
(Finland) Ulf Ceder 94.28	6
(England) Joe Murnan 85.61	6
(Germany) Gabriel Clemens 79.75	3
(England) Mervyn King 96.76	4
(Belgium) Dimitri Van den Bergh 96.86	6
(England) Matt Clark 88.44	6
(Germany) René Berndt 82.16	4
(England) Adrian Lewis 96.30	6
(England) Stephen Bunting 84.15	2
(England) Rob Cross 96.31	6
(England) Luke Woodhouse 93.02	3
(England) Steve West 90.82	6
(England) Chris Dobey 89.07	2
(England) James Richardson 94.51	6
(England) Paul Rowley 84.12	2
(Scotland) John Henderson 89.24	6
(Netherlands) Ron Meulenkamp 90.70	5
(Germany) Max Hopp 95.49	6
(Austria) Zoran Lerchbacher 85.76	4
(England) James Wilson 89.60	3
(Netherlands) Jan Dekker 108.12	6
(Wales) Mark Webster 81.56	6
(Germany) Bernd Roith 83.57	4
(Netherlands) Jermaine Wattimena 87.44	5
(Netherlands) Dirk van Duijvenbode 94.88	6
(Republic of Ireland) Steve Lennon 90.78	4
(Poland) Krzysztof Ratajski 99.52	6
(Netherlands) Christian Kist 89.92	2
(Wales) Jonny Clayton 96.81	6

Second round (best of 11 legs); 6 May
1	(Netherlands) Michael van Gerwen 97.05	6
(England) Keegan Brown 90.88	2
16	(Spain) Cristo Reyes 83.70	3
(Finland) Ulf Ceder 82.35	6
8	(Netherlands) Benito van de Pas 89.87	6
(England) Joe Murnan 92.16	5
9	(Wales) Gerwyn Price 96.67	6
(Belgium) Dimitri Van den Bergh 90.39	3
5	(England) Dave Chisnall 112.25	6
(England) Matt Clark 95.65	3
12	(England) Ian White 92.63	4
(England) Adrian Lewis 96.74	6
4	(Australia) Simon Whitlock 94.71	3
(England) Rob Cross 95.93	6
13	(England) Michael Smith 101.88	5
(England) Steve West 93.70	6
2	(Scotland) Peter Wright 100.65	6
(England) James Richardson 97.96	2
15	(Northern Ireland) Daryl Gurney 99.57	6
(Scotland) John Henderson 89.41	4
7	(Belgium) Kim Huybrechts 92.12	6
(Germany) Max Hopp 85.63	3
10	(England) Alan Norris 92.13	5
(Netherlands) Jan Dekker 91.36	6
6	(England) James Wade 89.33	5
(Wales) Mark Webster 89.13	6
11	(Netherlands) Jelle Klaasen 81.57	6
(Netherlands) Dirk van Duijvenbode 73.68	2
3	(Austria) Mensur Suljović 98.47	6
(Poland) Krzysztof Ratajski 91.03	4
14	(England) Joe Cullen 95.28	6
(Wales) Jonny Clayton 92.44	1

Third round (best of 11 legs); 7 May
1	(Netherlands) van Gerwen 97.12	6
(Finland) Ceder 91.90	2
8	(Netherlands) van de Pas 94.63	6
9	(Wales) Price 90.84	2
5	(England) Chisnall 99.02	6
(England) Lewis 94.41	3
(England) Cross 103.32	6
(England) West 100.62	1
2	(Scotland) Wright 100.38	6
15	(Northern Ireland) Gurney 99.46	4
7	(Belgium) Huybrechts 93.44	4
(Netherlands) Dekker 95.75	6
(Wales) Webster 92.94	1
11	(Netherlands) Klaasen 97.74	6
3	(Austria) Suljović 101.44	5
14	(England) Cullen 101.21	6

Quarter-finals (best of 11 legs); 7 May
1	(Netherlands) van Gerwen 104.05	6
8	(Netherlands) van de Pas 89.16	1
5	(England) Chisnall 95.80	6
(England) Cross 91.70	3
2	(Scotland) Wright 94.72	6
(Netherlands) Dekker 88.12	2
11	(Netherlands) Klaasen 94.91	6
14	(England) Cullen 91.53	5

Semi-finals (best of 11 legs); 7 May
1	(Netherlands) van Gerwen 105.85	6
5	(England) Chisnall 97.15	5
2	(Scotland) Wright 99.42	6
11	(Netherlands) Klaasen 90.26	3

Final (best of 11 legs); 7 May
1	(Netherlands) van Gerwen 99.56	0
2	(Scotland) Wright 104.86	6
