= World Series of Darts (disambiguation) =

World Series of Darts is a Professional Darts Corp. (PDC) tour started in 2013.

World Series of Darts may also refer to:

- World Series of Darts (2006 tournament), a former PDC darts tournament played in 2006 in Uncasville, Connecticut
- World Series of Darts Festival, a former PDC darts event held in 2010 in Las Vegas, Nevada
