= 2013 PDC World Darts Championship PDPA Qualifier =

Darts tournament

The 2013 PDC World Darts Championship PDPA Qualifier was a darts event that took place on November 26. Stuart Kellett won the event defeating John Bowles 5-1 in an all unseeded final. Kellett started in the first round while Bowles started in the preliminary round.

== Results ==
Second Round
1	(England) Mark Hylton	5
(England) Dave Smith	4
(England) Joey Palfreyman	5
(England) Matt Jackson	2
16	(England) Brian Woods	5
(India) Prakash Jiwa	3
(England) Stuart Kellett	5
(England) Ian Moss	2
8	(England) Kevin McDine	4
(Germany) Bernd Roith	5
(England) Darren Johnson	4
(England) Mick Todd	5
9	(Republic of Ireland) William O'Connor	5
(England) Chris Aubrey	3
(Scotland) Keith Stephen	5
(England) Steve West	2
5	(England) Mark Dudbridge	3
(England) Stephen McNally	5
(England) Gary Butcher	2
(England) Ross Smith	5
12	(England) Shaun Griffiths	5
(England) Mark Frost	3
(Wales) Gareth Pass	3
(England) Terry Temple	5
4	(Netherlands) Roland Scholten	5
(England) Tony Littleton	1
(England) Jamie Landon	2
(England) Andy Hibbert	5
13	(Wales) Barrie Bates	1
(England) Tony West	5
(England) Daniel Day	2
(England) Jamie Atkins	5
2	(England) Alan Tabern	5
(Scotland) Mike Veitch	1
(Wales) Wayne Atwood	3
(England) Mark Lawrence	5
15	(England) Chris Thompson	1
(Gibraltar) Dyson Parody	5
(England) Neville Roberts	3
(England) Andrew Humphrey	5
7	(England) Dennis Smith	5
(England) Steve Grubb	2
(England) Ian Jopling	5
(England) Mark Stephenson	3
10	(England) Steve Hine	3
(England) Paul Barham	5
(England) Mark Ashby	0
(England) Nick Fullwell	5
6	(England) Nigel Heydon	2
(England) Michael Barnard	5
(England) Nigel Birch	4
(England) Andrew Gilding	5
11	(England) Alex Roy	5
(England) Paul Rowley	3
(England) John Bowles	5
(England) Adam Smith-Neale	4
3	(Scotland) John Henderson	5
(England) Colin Monk	0
(Japan) Kentaro Suzuki	5
(England) Matt Padgett	3
14	(England) Steve Maish	5
(England) Darren Ward	2
(England) Matt Clark	5
(England) Joe Murnan	3

Third Round
1	(England) Mark Hylton	5
(England) Joey Palfreyman	4
16	(England) Brian Woods	1
(England) Stuart Kellett	5
(Germany) Bernd Roith	5
(England) Mick Todd	2
9	(Republic of Ireland) William O'Connor	4
(Scotland) Keith Stephen	5
(England) Stephen McNally	3
(England) Ross Smith	5
12	(England) Shaun Griffiths	1
(England) Terry Temple	5
4	(Netherlands) Roland Scholten	5
(England) Andy Hibbert	3
(England) Tony West	3
(England) Jamie Atkins	5
2	(England) Alan Tabern	4
(England) Mark Lawrence	5
(Gibraltar) Dyson Parody	5
(England) Andrew Humphrey	4
7	(England) Dennis Smith	5
(England) Ian Jopling	2
(England) Paul Barham	0
(England) Nick Fullwell	5
(England) Michael Barnard	5
(England) Andrew Gilding	2
11	(England) Alex Roy	3
(England) John Bowles	5
3	(Scotland) John Henderson	5
(Japan) Kentaro Suzuki	2
14	(England) Steve Maish	5
(England) Matt Clark	3

Fourth Round
1	(England) Mark Hylton	2
(England) Stuart Kellett	5
(Germany) Bernd Roith	5
(Scotland) Keith Stephen	1
(England) Ross Smith	1
(England) Terry Temple	5
4	(Netherlands) Roland Scholten	5
(England) Jamie Atkins	4
(England) Mark Lawrence	5
(Gibraltar) Dyson Parody	1
7	(England) Dennis Smith	5
(England) Nick Fullwell	3
(England) Michael Barnard	0
(England) John Bowles	5
3	(Scotland) John Henderson	3
14	(England) Steve Maish	5

Quarter-Finals
(England) Stuart Kellett	5
(Germany) Bernd Roith	3
(England) Terry Temple	5
4	(Netherlands) Roland Scholten	3
(England) Mark Lawrence	1
7	(England) Dennis Smith	5
(England) John Bowles	5
14	(England) Steve Maish	3

Semi-Finals
(England) Stuart Kellett	5
(England) Terry Temple	1
7	(England) Dennis Smith	0
(England) John Bowles	5

Final
(England) Stuart Kellett	5
(England) John Bowles	1

== 2013 PDC World Darts Championship ==
Winner Stuart Kellett lost in round one to 19th seed Dutchman Vincent van der Voort by three sets without reply while runner up John Bowles won his preliminary round match beating Spanish qualifier Carlos Rodriguez by four legs to two and was then involved in two exciting matches. In round one, he defeated 29th seed Englishman Jamie Caven by three sets to two but in round two he lost to 4th seed Scotsman Gary Anderson by four sets to three.
