= 1997 BDO World Darts Championship =

Tournament information
- Dates: 4–12 January 1997
- Venue: Lakeside Country Club
- Location: Frimley Green, Surrey
- Country: England, United Kingdom
- Organisation(s): BDO
- Format: Sets; Final – best of 11
- Prize fund: £158,000
- Winner's share: £38,000
- High checkout: 170 (Scotland) Les Wallace

Champion(s)
- (Scotland) Les Wallace

The 1997 BDO World Darts Championship (known for sponsorship reasons as the 1997 Embassy World Professional Darts Championship) was held from 4–12 January 1997 at the Lakeside Country Club in Frimley Green, Surrey. Scotland's Les Wallace defeated Wales' Marshall James 6–3 in the final to win the title. He became the second Scotsman to become World Darts Champion after Jocky Wilson won it twice in 1982 and 1989. Wallace also became the first left-handed player to win either version of the World Darts Championship.

It was also the second time in four years that two unseeded players had reached the final, and remains the most recent occasion that this has occurred.

== Seeds ==
1. (England) Martin Adams
2. (Netherlands) Roland Scholten
3. (Netherlands) Raymond van Barneveld
4. (Wales) Richie Burnett
5. (England) Steve Beaton
6. (England) Colin Monk
7. (England) Ronnie Baxter
8. (England) Andy Fordham

== Prize money ==
The prize money was £152,400.

Champion: £38,000
Runner-Up: £19,000
Semi-Finalists (2): £8,700
Quarter-Finalists (4): £4,400
Last 16 (8): £3,350
Last 32 (16): £2,100

There was also a 9 Dart Checkout prize of £52,000, along with a High Checkout prize of £1,600.

== The Results ==
First Round (best of 5 sets)
1	(England) Martin Adams (97.05)	1
(United States) Roger Carter (94.50)	3
(Canada) John Part (87.54)	3
(Scotland) Alan Brown (81.06)	1
8	(England) Andy Fordham (87.45)	3
(England) Matt Clark (89.88)	2
(Wales) Marshall James (82.17)	3
(England) William Burksfield (73.47)	1
5	(England) Steve Beaton (86.47)	3
(Canada) Carl Mercer (76.25)	0
(Northern Ireland) Geoff Wylie (92.64)	3
(England) Andy Smith (87.93)	2
4	(Wales) Richie Burnett (91.23)	3
(Australia) Peter Hinkley (79.23)	1
(Belgium) Leo Laurens (85.71)	3
(Wales) Ritchie Davies (83.43)	0
2	(Netherlands) Roland Scholten (88.44)	3
(England) Mike Gregory (87.60)	2
(England) Bobby George (84.00)	3
(England) Mick Brooks (82.95)	1
7	(England) Ronnie Baxter (85.86)	3
(England) Andy Jenkins (88.89)	0
Mervyn King (91.50)	3
(Australia) Graham Hunt (87.57)	1
6	(England) Colin Monk (88.53)	3
(England) Chris Hornby (72.81)	0
(England) Paul Williams (83.16)	3
(Belgium) Erik Clarys (81.99)	2
3	(Netherlands) Raymond van Barneveld (85.86)	3
(Wales) Sean Palfrey (77.88)	0
(Scotland) Les Wallace (99.45)	3
(Scotland) Bob Taylor (92.43)	1

Second Round (best of 5 sets)
(United States) Roger Carter (85.62)	3
John Part (86.79)	1
8	(England) Andy Fordham (87.45)	1
(Wales) Marshall James (89.91)	3
5	Steve Beaton (92.52)	3
(Northern Ireland) Geoff Wylie (81.60)	0
4	(Wales) Richie Burnett (88.95)	0
(Belgium) Leo Laurens (92.46)	3
2	Roland Scholten (88.62)	3
(England) Bobby George (83.10)	0
7	(England) Ronnie Baxter (93.15)	2
Mervyn King (96.78)	3
6	(England) Colin Monk (85.68)	1
(England) Paul Williams (86.01)	3
3	(Netherlands) Raymond van Barneveld (95.31)	2
(Scotland) Les Wallace (94.23)	3

Quarter-Finals (best of 7 sets)
(United States) Roger Carter (86.61)	3
(Wales) Marshall James (90.36)	4
5	(England) Steve Beaton (91.17)	4
(Belgium) Leo Laurens (88.47)	3
2	(Netherlands) Roland Scholten (92.46)	2
(England) Mervyn King (91.77)	4
(England) Paul Williams (95.34)	0
(Scotland) Les Wallace (96.78)	4

Semi-Finals (best of 9 sets)
(Wales) Marshall James (89.88)	5
5	Steve Beaton (85.17)	4
Mervyn King (96.84)	3
(Scotland) Les Wallace (94.02)	5

Final (best of 11 sets)
(Wales) Marshall James (92.01)	3
(Scotland) Les Wallace (92.19)	6
