= 2008 World Matchplay =

2008 Stan James World Matchplay

Tournament information
- Dates: 20–26 July 2008
- Venue: Winter Gardens
- Location: Blackpool, England
- Organisation(s): Professional Darts Corporation (PDC)
- Format: Legs
- Prize fund: £300,000
- Winner's share: £60,000
- High checkout: 161 (England) Matt Clark

Champion(s)
- (England) Phil Taylor

The 2008 Stan James World Matchplay was the 15th annual staging of the World Matchplay darts tournament by the Professional Darts Corporation. The tournament took place at the Winter Gardens, Blackpool, from 20 to 26 July 2008.

World number three James Wade went into the competition as the defending champion and managed to reach the final for the third year in a row, but was defeated by top seed Phil Taylor 18–9 who won his ninth World Matchplay championship.

== Prize fund ==
A total of £300,000 was available for the players, divided based on the following performances:

Position (no. of players)		Prize money (Total: £300,000)
Winner	(1)	£60,000
Runner-Up	(1)	£30,000
Semi-finalists	(2)	£17,000
Quarter-finalists	(4)	£12,000
Second round	(8)	£8,000
First round	(16)	£4,000
Nine-dart finish	(0)	£10,000

== Qualification ==
The qualification process for the World Matchplay differed this year. The top 16 in the PDC Order of the Merit after the 2008 UK Open qualified automatically as the 16 seeds. The other 16 places would be made up of the 16 highest ranked players (not already in the top 16) from the 2008 Players Championship Order of Merit - decided by the various Player Championship events taking place on the PDC Pro Tour from January 2008 - the cutoff point was the Las Vegas Players Championship just before the 2008 Las Vegas Desert Classic.

Thus, the participants were:

=== PDC Top 16 ===
1. (England) Phil Taylor (winner)
2. (Netherlands) Raymond van Barneveld (quarter-finals)
3. (England) James Wade (runner-up)
4. (Canada) John Part (second round)
5. (England) Terry Jenkins (second round)
6. (Netherlands) Roland Scholten (first round)
7. (England) Andy Hamilton (first round)
8. (England) Adrian Lewis (first round)
9. (England) Colin Lloyd (first round)
10. (England) Wayne Mardle (semi-finals)
11. (England) Peter Manley (second round)
12. (England) Dennis Priestley (semi-finals)
13. (England) Alan Tabern (quarter-finals)
14. (England) Ronnie Baxter (second round)
15. (England) Kevin Painter (first round)
16. (England) Colin Osborne (second round)

=== PDPA Players Championship qualifiers ===
1. (England) Mervyn King (first round)
2. (England) Chris Mason (first round)
3. (Netherlands) Vincent van der Voort (first round)
4. (England) Denis Ovens (first round)
5. (England) Wayne Jones (first round)
6. (England) Mark Dudbridge (first round)
7. (England) Andy Smith (first round)
8. (England) Kevin McDine (quarter-finals)
9. (England) Mark Walsh (second round)
10. (England) Matt Clark (quarter-finals)
11. (England) Steve Beaton (first round)
12. (Netherlands) Michael van Gerwen (second round)
13. (England) Tony Eccles (second round)
14. (England) Alex Roy (first round)
15. (England) Mark Frost (first round)
16. (England) Adrian Gray (first round)

== Draw ==
First round (best of 19 legs); 20–22 July
1	(England) Phil Taylor 103.53	10
(England) Steve Beaton 97.91	6
16	(England) Colin Osborne 96.78	10
(England) Mervyn King 91.48	7
8	(England) Adrian Lewis 88.75	8
(England) Kevin McDine 96.02	10
9	(England) Colin Lloyd 91.37	6
(England) Mark Walsh 100.41	10
5	(England) Terry Jenkins 92.48	10
(England) Alex Roy 91.32	6
12	(England) Dennis Priestley 91.13	10
(England) Adrian Gray 84.63	8
4	(Canada) John Part 85.24	10
(England) Chris Mason 81.97	3
13	(England) Alan Tabern 95.75	10
(Netherlands) Vincent van der Voort 92.25	8
2	(Netherlands) Raymond van Barneveld 88.41	11
(England) Mark Frost 82.17	9
15	(England) Kevin Painter 86.57	8
(England) Tony Eccles 88.73	10
7	(England) Andy Hamilton 92.59	12
(Netherlands) Michael van Gerwen 93.22	14
10	(England) Wayne Mardle 88.29	11
(England) Mark Dudbridge 88.28	9
6	(Netherlands) Roland Scholten 90.56	4
(England) Matt Clark 90.75	10
11	(England) Peter Manley 91.14	10
(England) Denis Ovens 90.59	4
3	(England) James Wade 96.31	10
(England) Wayne Jones 91.04	4
14	(England) Ronnie Baxter 93.33	10
(England) Andy Smith 84.45	4

Second round (best of 25 legs); 22–23 July
1	(England) Phil Taylor 109.70	13
16	(England) Colin Osborne 97.08	5
(England) Kevin McDine 92.29	13
(England) Mark Walsh 95.02	9
5	(England) Terry Jenkins 93.10	11
12	(England) Dennis Priestley 94.60	13
4	(Canada) John Part 90.26	7
13	(England) Alan Tabern 93.53	13
2	(Netherlands) Raymond van Barneveld 90.99	13
(England) Tony Eccles 84.83	3
(Netherlands) Michael van Gerwen 88.13	9
10	(England) Wayne Mardle 91.70	13
(England) Matt Clark 88.39	13
11	(England) Peter Manley 88.91	6
3	(England) James Wade 97.99	13
14	(England) Ronnie Baxter 93.06	7

Quarter-finals (best of 31 legs); 24 July
1	(England) Phil Taylor 95.78	16
(England) Kevin McDine 89.76	6
12	(England) Dennis Priestley 94.10	16
13	(England) Alan Tabern 90.65	14
2	(Netherlands) Raymond van Barneveld 89.32	16
10	(England) Wayne Mardle 87.90	18
(England) Matt Clark 93.27	12
3	(England) James Wade 96.58	16

Semi-finals (best of 33 legs); 25 July
1	(England) Phil Taylor 105.59	17
12	(England) Dennis Priestley 96.56	8
10	(England) Wayne Mardle 88.92	5
3	(England) James Wade 102.73	17

Final (best of 35 legs); 26 July
1	(England) Phil Taylor 109.47	18
3	(England) James Wade 102.58	9

== Statistics ==
Player	Eliminated	Played	Legs Won	Legs Lost	LWAT	100+	140+	180s	High Checkout	3-dart Average
(England) Phil Taylor	Winner	5	74	34	30	143	92	36	160	104.81
(England) James Wade	Final	5	65	46	28	120	95	42	157	99.49
(England) Wayne Mardle	Semi-finals	4	47	51	16	133	65	12	155	89.20
(England) Dennis Priestley	Semi-finals	4	47	50	18	131	62	13	155	94.10
(Netherlands) Raymond van Barneveld	Quarter-finals	3	40	30	16	91	44	6	138	89.57
(England) Kevin McDine	Quarter-finals	3	29	33	9	87	35	15	160	92.69
(England) Matt Clark	Quarter-finals	3	35	26	11	75	34	9	161	90.80
(England) Alan Tabern	Quarter-finals	3	37	31	14	98	52	14	120	93.31
(England) Mark Walsh	Second round	2	19	19	7	60	26	12	96	97.72
(England) Colin Osborne	Second round	2	15	20	5	44	19	10	110	96.93
(England) Ronnie Baxter	Second round	2	17	17	7	44	23	4	102	93.20
(England) Terry Jenkins	Second round	2	21	19	9	52	30	9	160	92.79
(Netherlands) Michael van Gerwen	Second round	2	23	25	9	64	29	8	112	90.68
(England) Peter Manley	Second round	2	16	17	5	48	20	8	156	90.03
(Canada) John Part	Second round	2	17	16	6	26	24	7	120	87.75
(England) Tony Eccles	Second round	2	13	21	4	54	11	4	157	86.78
(England) Kevin Painter	First round	1	8	10	3	26	10	2	76	86.57
(England) Adrian Gray	First round	1	8	10	3	23	7	3	81	84.63
(England) Andy Smith	First round	1	4	10	1	22	5	2	80	84.45
(England) Mark Frost	First round	1	9	11	5	29	13	2	102	82.17
(England) Steve Beaton	First round	1	6	10	0	19	14	4	152	97.91
(England) Adrian Lewis	First round	1	8	10	3	17	14	4	116	88.75
(England) Mark Dudbridge	First round	1	9	11	2	23	18	5	160	88.28
(England) Andy Hamilton	First round	1	12	14	5	35	18	4	140	92.59
(Netherlands) Vincent van der Voort	First round	1	8	10	3	18	15	5	96	92.25
(England) Mervyn King	First round	1	7	10	1	22	13	1	116	91.49
(England) Colin Lloyd	First round	1	6	10	2	22	5	2	127	91.37
(England) Alex Roy	First round	1	6	10	3	27	13	2	116	91.32
(England) Wayne Jones	First round	1	4	10	1	18	12	1	116	91.04
(England) Denis Ovens	First round	1	4	10	1	22	10	3	110	90.59
(Netherlands) Roland Scholten	First round	1	4	10	0	17	6	1	74	90.56
(England) Chris Mason	First round	1	3	10	1	26	3	0	115	81.97
