= 2010 European Championship (darts) =

2010 PartyPoker.net European Championship

Tournament information
- Dates: 29 July–1 August 2010
- Venue: Stadthalle Dinslaken
- Location: Dinslaken
- Country: Germany
- Organisation(s): PDC
- Format: Legs; Final – best of 21
- Prize fund: £200,000
- Winner's share: £50,000
- High checkout: 170 (England) Wes Newton

Champion(s)
- (England) Phil Taylor

The 2010 PartyPoker.net European Championship was the third edition of the PDC tournament, the European Championship, which allows the top European players to compete against the highest ranked players from the PDC Order of Merit. The tournament took place at the Stadthalle Dinslaken in Dinslaken, Germany, from 29 July–1 August 2010, featuring a field of 32 players and £200,000 in prize money, with £50,000 going to the winner.

World number one Phil Taylor once again successfully defended the title after an 11-1 demolition of Wayne Jones, who played his first ever televised final.

== Prize money ==
Position (no. of players)		Prize money (Total: £200,000)
Winner	(1)	£50,000
Runner-Up	(1)	£20,000
Semi-finalists	(2)	£10,000
Quarter-finalists	(4)	£7,500
Last 16 (second round)	(8)	£5,000
Last 32 (first round)	(16)	£2,500

== Qualification ==
The top 16 players from the PDC Order of Merit after the World Series of Darts Festival in Las Vegas automatically qualified for the event. The top 8 from these rankings were also the seeded players. The remaining 16 places went to the top 8 non-qualified players from the 2010 Continental Europe Order of Merit, and then to the top 8 non-qualified players from the 2010 Players Championship Order of Merit.

PDC Top 16
1. (England) Phil Taylor (champion)
2. (Netherlands) Raymond van Barneveld (quarter-finals)
3. (England) James Wade (first round)
4. (England) Mervyn King (first round)
5. (England) Terry Jenkins (semi-finals)
6. (England) Ronnie Baxter (quarter-finals)
7. (England) Adrian Lewis (first round)
8. (England) Mark Walsh (quarter-finals)
9. (England) Colin Lloyd (semi-finals)
10. (England) Andy Hamilton (first round)
11. (England) Colin Osborne (first round)
12. (Australia) Simon Whitlock (second round)
13. (Scotland) Robert Thornton (second round)
14. (England) Dennis Priestley (first round)
15. (England) Alan Tabern (first round)
16. (Australia) Paul Nicholson (first round)

Players Championship qualifiers
1. (Scotland) Gary Anderson (first round)
2. (England) Denis Ovens (first round)
3. (England) Wayne Jones (runner-up)
4. (England) Wes Newton (second round)
5. (England) Andy Smith (second round)
6. (England) Jamie Caven (quarter-finals)
7. (Wales) Barrie Bates (second round)
8. (England) Mark Dudbridge (first round)

European qualifiers
1. (Netherlands) Vincent van der Voort (first round)
2. (Netherlands) Co Stompé (first round)
3. (Netherlands) Jelle Klaasen (second round)
4. (Spain) Antonio Alcinas (first round)
5. (Germany) Bernd Roith (second round)
6. (Netherlands) Michael van Gerwen (second round)
7. (Germany) Tomas Seyler (first round)
8. (Germany) Andree Welge (first round)

== Draw and results ==
Draw and schedule of play as follows:

First round (best of 11 legs); 29–30 July
1	(England) Phil Taylor 101.27	6
(Netherlands) Co Stompé 98.22	2
(Australia) Paul Nicholson 83.11	3
(England) Andy Smith 90.82	6
8	(England) Mark Walsh 97.90	6
(Spain) Antonio Alcinas 90.82	3
(Netherlands) Jelle Klaasen 88.05	6
(Netherlands) Vincent van der Voort 86.44	4
5	(England) Terry Jenkins 91.88	6
(Germany) Andree Welge 79.24	4
(Australia) Simon Whitlock 99.60	6
(England) Dennis Priestley 89.14	3
4	(England) Mervyn King 100.73	3
(Wales) Barrie Bates 96.74	6
(Scotland) Gary Anderson 85.08	2
(England) Jamie Caven 89.55	6
2	(Netherlands) Raymond van Barneveld 98.32	6
(England) Andy Hamilton 96.54	5
(Germany) Bernd Roith 86.44	6
(England) Denis Ovens 90.14	4
7	(England) Adrian Lewis 77.28	3
(England) Wayne Jones 85.57	6
(England) Mark Dudbridge 86.39	4
(Scotland) Robert Thornton 89.11	6
6	(England) Ronnie Baxter 96.31	6
(England) Alan Tabern 90.29	5
(England) Colin Osborne 94.94	4
(England) Wes Newton 92.90	6
3	(England) James Wade 96.00	3
(England) Colin Lloyd 98.29	6
(Germany) Tomas Seyler 87.69	4
(Netherlands) Michael van Gerwen 91.75	6

Second round (best of 19 legs); 31 July
1	(England) Phil Taylor 106.16	10
(England) Andy Smith 90.39	5
8	(England) Mark Walsh 85.11	10
(Netherlands) Jelle Klaasen 89.59	7
5	(England) Terry Jenkins 89.24	10
(Australia) Simon Whitlock 90.71	8
(Wales) Barrie Bates 94.31	6
(England) Jamie Caven 99.23	10
2	(Netherlands) Raymond van Barneveld 94.02	10
(Germany) Bernd Roith 89.34	7
(England) Wayne Jones 96.01	10
(Scotland) Robert Thornton 86.93	4
6	(England) Ronnie Baxter 93.63	10
(England) Wes Newton 96.93	9
(England) Colin Lloyd 101.13	10
(Netherlands) Michael van Gerwen 95.10	6

Quarter-finals (best of 19 legs); 1 August
1	(England) Phil Taylor 103.33	10
8	(England) Mark Walsh 94.81	4
5	(England) Terry Jenkins 95.71	10
(England) Jamie Caven 95.39	6
2	(Netherlands) Raymond van Barneveld 100.02	8
(England) Wayne Jones 95.43	10
6	(England) Ronnie Baxter 88.84	7
(England) Colin Lloyd 101.63	10

Semi-finals (best of 21 legs); 1 August
1	(England) Phil Taylor 105.37	11
5	(England) Terry Jenkins 99.97	10
(England) Wayne Jones 91.99	11
(England) Colin Lloyd 88.65	10

Final (best of 21 legs); 1 August
1	(England) Phil Taylor 105.74	11
(England) Wayne Jones 94.64	1

Scores after player's names are three-dart averages (total points scored divided by darts thrown and multiplied by 3)

== Statistics ==
Player	Played	Legs Won	Legs Lost	100+	140+	180s	High Checkout	3-dart Average
(England) Phil Taylor	5	48	22	77	75	19	128	104.37
(England) Mervyn King	1	3	6	7	10	3	124	100.73
(Australia) Simon Whitlock	2	14	13	34	21	7	90	95.16
(Netherlands) Co Stompé	1	2	6	10	3	4	94	98.22
(England) Mark Walsh	3	20	20	52	32	7	128	92.61
(Wales) Barrie Bates	2	12	13	47	14	2	136	95.53
(England) Terry Jenkins	4	36	29	91	52	11	161	94.20
(England) Andy Smith	2	11	13	41	15	2	120	90.61
(Spain) Antonio Alcinas	1	3	6	9	8	0	160	90.82
(England) Dennis Priestley	1	3	6	13	5	2	24	89.14
(England) Jamie Caven	3	22	18	53	22	12	127	94.72
(Netherlands) Jelle Klaasen	2	13	14	25	13	3	142	88.82
(Netherlands) Vincent van der Voort	1	4	6	10	10	0	103	86.44
(Scotland) Gary Anderson	1	2	6	6	5	3	48	85.08
(Australia) Paul Nicholson	1	3	9	5	2	5	90	83.11
(Germany) Andree Welge	1	4	6	10	3	1	83	79.24
(England) Mark Dudbridge	1	4	6	10	10	1	101	86.39
(Netherlands) Raymond van Barneveld	3	24	22	64	35	8	164	97.45
(England) Alan Tabern	1	5	6	16	5	3	141	90.29
(Scotland) Robert Thornton	2	10	14	42	10	3	88	88.02
(Germany) Bernd Roith	2	13	14	43	17	2	152	87.89
(England) Andy Hamilton	1	5	6	9	7	4	98	96.54
(Netherlands) Michael van Gerwen	2	12	14	32	17	3	113	93.43
(England) Colin Osborne	1	4	6	10	4	5	68	94.94
(England) Colin Lloyd	4	36	28	80	56	15	160	97.43
(Germany) Tomas Seyler	1	4	6	11	8	1	96	87.69
(England) Denis Ovens	1	4	6	17	6	2	84	90.14
(England) Wes Newton	2	15	14	34	15	10	170	94.92
(England) Adrian Lewis	1	3	6	9	5	0	40	77.28
(England) Ronnie Baxter	3	23	24	62	29	4	146	92.93
(England) Wayne Jones	5	38	36	103	65	17	116	92.73

== Television coverage ==
The PDC announced on 20 May 2010 that UK entertainment channel Bravo would broadcast the entire event live. This was the first and only time that Bravo televised live darts before the channel closed in 2011.

The German television channel SPORT1 also broadcast the event.
