= Bernd Roith =

German darts player (born 1959)

Personal information
- Nickname: "Bernie"
- Born: 30 December 1959 (age 66) Berlin, Germany
- Home town: Tübingen, Germany

Sport
- Sport: Darts
- Playing since: 1989
- Darts: 21 Gram Harrows Atlantis
- Laterality: Right-handed
- Walk-on music: "Cum On Feel the Noize" by Slade

Organisation (see split in darts)
- PDC: 2008–2020

PDC premier events – best performances
- World Championship: Last 64: 2011
- UK Open: Last 128: 2012, 2013
- European Championship: Last 16: 2010

Bernd Roith (born 30 December 1959) is a German darts player who plays in Professional Darts Corporation (PDC) events.

== Career ==
Roith is a chef by profession. He qualified for the 2010 European Championship via the PDC European Order of Merit. In the first round, he defeated Denis Ovens 6–4. In the second round, he gave Raymond van Barneveld a massive scare before eventually losing 10–7. Roith also qualified for the 2011 PDC World Darts Championship through the European order of merit, though he lost in the first round 3–0 to Dennis Priestley.

Roith earned a two-year PDC tour card in January 2012 on the fourth and final day of the Qualifying School with a 6–5 win over Les Wallace in his final match. He represented Germany with Jyhan Artut in the 2012 World Cup of Darts and together they were beaten 3–1 by the United States in the second round. In June, he earned a place in the German Darts Championship in Berlin by defeating Sven Mehl and Tomas Seyler in the Home Nation Qualifier. Roith played three-time world champion John Part in the first round and was beaten 6–1. In October, Roith beat Lars Erkelenz and Michael Rosenauer in the European Qualifier for the Dutch Darts Masters, but was whitewashed 6–0 by Vincent van der Voort in the first round. In an attempt to reach the 2013 World Championship, Roith lost in the quarter-finals of the Qualifier 5–3 to Stuart Kellett.

Roith began 2013 ranked world number 87. At the UK Masters he beat Justin Pipe 6–2, but narrowly lost 6–5 to Mensur Suljović in the second round. Roith lost 5–3 to Ted Hankey in the first round of the UK Open. His best run of the year came at the 14th Players Championship where he was beaten in the last 16 by Ian White. Roith qualified for three European Tour events in 2014, losing in the first round in two and beating Salmon Renyaan 6–1 at the Austrian Darts Open, before being defeated 6–2 by Wes Newton in the second round.

In 2015, Roith was unsuccessful at Q School and failed to qualify for the UK Open. He did qualify for the German Darts Championship, but withdrew from the event before it started. The following year, a single last 64 showing in a UK Open Qualifier was the best he could manage.

== World Championship results ==
=== PDC ===
- 2011: First round (lost to Dennis Priestley 0–3)
