= 2014 Austrian Darts Open =

Tournament information
- Dates: 20–22 June 2014
- Venue: Salzburgarena
- Location: Salzburg
- Country: Austria
- Organisation(s): PDC
- Format: Legs
- Prize fund: £100,000
- Winner's share: £20,000
- High checkout: 170 (England) Jamie Caven

Champion(s)
- (Netherlands) Vincent van der Voort

The 2014 Austrian Darts Open was the fourth of eight PDC European Tour events on the 2014 PDC Pro Tour. The tournament took place at the Salzburgarena in Salzburg, Austria, between 20–22 June 2014. It featured a field of 48 players and £100,000 in prize money, with £20,000 going to the winner.

Vincent van der Voort won his first European Tour title by defeating Jamie Caven 6–5 in the final.

== Prize money ==
| Stage (num. of players) | | Prize money |
|---|---|---|
| Winner | (1) | £20,000 |
| Runner-up | (1) | £8,000 |
| Semi-finalists | (2) | £4,000 |
| Quarter-finalists | (4) | £3,000 |
| Third round losers | (8) | £2,000 |
| Second round losers | (16) | £1,250 |
| First round losers | (16) | £1,000 |
| Total | £100,000 | |

== Qualification and format ==
The top 16 players from the PDC ProTour Order of Merit on 29 April 2014 automatically qualified for the event. The remaining 32 places went to players from three qualifying events - 20 from the UK Qualifier (held in Wigan on 2 May), eight from the European Qualifier and four from the Host Nation Qualifier (held at the venue the day before the event started). Michael van Gerwen withdrew on the morning before his second round match against Dean Winstanley due to an ankle injury. Winstanley received a bye through to the third round.

The following players took part in the tournament:

Top 16
1. ~~(Netherlands) Michael van Gerwen (withdrew)~~
2. (Scotland) Gary Anderson (second round)
3. (Northern Ireland) Brendan Dolan (third round)
4. (England) Phil Taylor (quarter-finals)
5. (England) Dave Chisnall (second round)
6. (Belgium) Kim Huybrechts (second round)
7. (Scotland) Robert Thornton (third round)
8. (Scotland) Peter Wright (semi-finals)
9. (England) Steve Beaton (third round)
10. (England) Ian White (second round)
11. (England) Mervyn King (second round)
12. (England) Jamie Caven (runner-up)
13. (Australia) Simon Whitlock (third round)
14. (England) Justin Pipe (second round)
15. (England) Andy Hamilton (second round)
16. (England) Wes Newton (quarter-finals)

UK Qualifier
- (England) Arron Monk (first round)
- (England) Michael Smith (second round)
- (England) Ronnie Baxter (third round)
- (Republic of Ireland) William O'Connor (first round)
- (England) Ben Ward (second round)
- (Wales) Jamie Lewis (first round)
- (England) Dean Winstanley (third round)
- (England) Alex Roy (second round)
- (England) Andy Smith (quarter-finals)
- (England) Dennis Smith (first round)
- (England) Terry Jenkins (second round)
- (England) David Pallett (first round)
- (England) Kevin Dowling (first round)
- (England) Andrew Gilding (second round)
- (England) Stephen Bunting (third round)
- (Canada) John Part (quarter-finals)
- (England) Mark Walsh (first round)
- (Wales) Barrie Bates (first round)
- (Scotland) John Henderson (second round)
- (Wales) Mark Webster (first round)

European Qualifier
- (Netherlands) Dirk van Duijvenbode (first round)
- (Netherlands) Vincent van der Voort (winner)
- (Germany) Bernd Roith (second round)
- (Netherlands) Benito van de Pas (third round)
- (Finland) Marko Kantele (first round)
- (Germany) Max Hopp (first round)
- (Netherlands) Christian Kist (first round)
- (Netherlands) Salmon Renyaan (first round)

Host Nation Qualifier
- (Austria) Rowby-John Rodriguez (second round)
- (Austria) Uwe Bacher (first round)
- (Austria) Michael Rasztovits (first round)
- (Austria) Mensur Suljović (semi-finals)

== Draw ==
First round (best of 11 legs); 20 June
(England) Dean Winstanley 84.73 | 6
(Austria) Uwe Bacher 67.39 | 4
(Germany) Bernd Roith 86.62 | 6
(Netherlands) Salmon Renyaan 75.85 | 1
(England) Michael Smith 114.15 | 6
(England) David Pallett 90.81 | 0
(England) Mark Walsh 94.07 | 4
(England) Andrew Gilding 92.31 | 6
(England) Arron Monk 86.11 | 1
(England) Stephen Bunting 92.84 | 6
(England) Terry Jenkins 108.50 | 6
(Germany) Max Hopp 100.62 | 2
(Wales) Jamie Lewis 81.34 | 3
(England) Alex Roy 88.16 | 6
(Scotland) John Henderson 98.56 | 6
(Austria) Michael Rasztovits 92.89 | 4
(England) Kevin Dowling 83.65 | 3
(England) Andy Smith 86.78 | 6
(Wales) Mark Webster 82.35 | 4
(England) Ronnie Baxter 83.97 | 6
(Netherlands) Dirk van Duijvenbode 77.58 | 3
(Austria) Rowby-John Rodriguez 82.80 | 6
(England) Dennis Smith 94.91 | 5
(Austria) Mensur Suljović 96.26 | 6
(Republic of Ireland) William O'Connor 86.81 | 5
(Netherlands) Benito van de Pas 90.03 | 6
(Canada) John Part 88.16 | 6
(Finland) Marko Kantele 89.02 | 5
(England) Ben Ward 84.86 | 6
(Wales) Barrie Bates 83.96 | 4
(Netherlands) Vincent van der Voort 99.76 | 6
(Netherlands) Christian Kist 93.94 | 2

Second round (best of 11 legs); 21 June
1 | (Netherlands) Michael van Gerwen | w/d
(England) Dean Winstanley | w/o
16 | (England) Wes Newton 94.54 | 6
(Germany) Bernd Roith 90.45 | 2
8 | (Scotland) Peter Wright 102.95 | 6
(England) Michael Smith 96.37 | 3
9 | (England) Steve Beaton 87.03 | 6
(England) Andrew Gilding 90.84 | 5
5 | (England) Dave Chisnall 95.01 | 1
(England) Stephen Bunting 108.34 | 6
12 | (England) Jamie Caven 98.94 | 6
(England) Terry Jenkins 97.05 | 5
4 | (England) Phil Taylor 98.53 | 6
(England) Alex Roy 80.35 | 3
13 | (Australia) Simon Whitlock 83.96 | 6
(Scotland) John Henderson 88.08 | 4
2 | (Scotland) Gary Anderson 102.05 | 2
(England) Andy Smith 96.64 | 6
15 | (England) Andy Hamilton 93.68 | 5
(England) Ronnie Baxter 90.62 | 6
7 | (Scotland) Robert Thornton 97.97 | 6
(Austria) Rowby-John Rodriguez 90.87 | 5
10 | (England) Ian White 90.46 | 3
(Austria) Mensur Suljović 95.65 | 6
6 | (Belgium) Kim Huybrechts 98.41 | 3
(Netherlands) Benito van de Pas 94.10 | 6
11 | (England) Mervyn King 82.70 | 3
(Canada) John Part 88.01 | 6
3 | (Northern Ireland) Brendan Dolan 90.41 | 6
(England) Ben Ward 84.68 | 5
14 | (England) Justin Pipe 91.03 | 2
(Netherlands) Vincent van der Voort 96.64 | 6

Third round (best of 11 legs); 22 June
(England) Winstanley 94.22 | 3
16 | (England) Newton 96.52 | 6
8 | (Scotland) Wright 99.70 | 6
9 | (England) Beaton 94.60 | 3
(England) Bunting 100.50 | 5
12 | (England) Caven 100.03 | 6
4 | (England) Taylor 102.35 | 6
13 | (Australia) Whitlock 95.90 | 2
(England) A. Smith 92.26 | 6
(England) Baxter 86.31 | 2
7 | (Scotland) Thornton 94.27 | 4
(Austria) Suljović 94.33 | 6
(Netherlands) van de Pas 93.00 | 4
(Canada) Part 92.37 | 6
3 | (Northern Ireland) Dolan 85.86 | 1
(Netherlands) van der Voort 95.43 | 6

Quarter-finals (best of 11 legs); 22 June
16 | (England) Newton 97.17 | 5
8 | (Scotland) Wright 97.45 | 6
12 | (England) Caven 93.98 | 6
4 | (England) Taylor 94.94 | 5
(England) A. Smith 87.80 | 2
(Austria) Suljović 97.37 | 6
(Canada) Part 86.16 | 2
(Netherlands) van der Voort 89.05 | 6

Semi-finals (best of 11 legs); 22 June
8 | (Scotland) Wright 100.53 | 5
12 | (England) Caven 94.53 | 6
(Austria) Suljović 87.43 | 3
(Netherlands) van der Voort 97.61 | 6

Final (best of 11 legs); 22 June
12 | (England) Caven 90.15 | 5
(Netherlands) van der Voort 94.84 | 6
