= Marshall James =

Welsh darts player

Personal information
- Nickname: "Big MJ"
- Born: 23 October 1961 (age 64) Cardiff, Wales
- Home town: Llanelli, Wales

Sport
- Sport: Darts
- Playing since: 1982
- Darts: 21g Unicorn
- Laterality: Right-handed

Organisation (see split in darts)
- BDO: 1991–1999
- PDC: 2003

WDF major events – best performances
- World Championship: Runner-up: 1997
- World Masters: Semi-final: 1998

PDC premier events – best performances
- UK Open: Last 128: 2003

Other tournament wins
- Tournament: Years
- Welsh Open WDF World Cup WDF Europe Cup: 1997; 1997; 1998

Marshall James (born 23 October 1961) is a Welsh former professional darts player. He was the runner-up at the 1997 BDO World Championship in his debut year and also reached the semi-finals of the 1998 World Masters. He was known for his slow, deliberate throwing style.

== Career ==
James reached the BDO World Darts Championship final at the 1997 event. He started the tournament with 3–1 victories against Willam Burksfield, and 8th seed Andy Fordham, a future BDO world champion then achieved deciding set wins against Roger Carter and defending champion Steve Beaton (in the sudden death leg, finishing with a 106 checkout after Beaton had narrowly missed one dart at double 10 for the match). In the final against Les Wallace, James looked impressive in the earlier sets of the match and was unfortunate to trail 3–2 at the interval. Wallace gained increasing momentum after the interval while James' momentum faded away fast. Wallace dominated the later sets, winning the final by a comfortable 6–3 by the end.

James only made two more appearances at Lakeside. He was beaten in the first round in 1998 by Richie Burnett and in the second round in 1999 by Steve Duke.

He was a member of the Welsh WDF World Cup winning team in 1997. Wales won the Overall World Cup and Team Event in that year. He also teamed up with Martin Phillips, Sean Palfrey and Ritchie Davies as Wales won the 1998 WDF Europe Cup.

James won the 1997 Welsh Open, having been the runner-up in 1991 and a quarter-finalist in 1992.

He made his PDC UK Open debut at the 2003 tournament but lost to Mark Thomson 5–4 in the first round.

== World Championship results ==
=== BDO ===
- 1997: Runner-up (lost to Les Wallace 3–6) (sets)
- 1998: First round (lost to Richie Burnett 1–3)
- 1999: Second round (lost to Steve Duke 1–3)
