= Cricket (darts) =

Darts game

Typical cricket score card

Cricket is a darts game that uses the standard 20 number dartboard with the triple and double rings.

== Gameplay ==
Cricket is typically played between 2, 3 or 4 players, or teams of players, although the rules do not discount more players. The goal of cricket is to be the first player to open or close all the cricket numbers and have a higher or even point total.

=== Cricket numbers ===
Cricket uses the numbers 15 to 20 (or sometimes 10 to 20, and less frequently a predetermined selection of numbers) and the bullseye. To open or close a number, it must have been scored three times in any fashion, on one or more turns. Hitting the triple can open or close a number in one throw; a single and the double can open or close it in two throws or three singles can open or close it in three throws. Except in strict variants which count down from 20 to 15, numbers do not have to be opened or closed in any particular order and several numbers can be hit in the same turn. A scoreboard is used to keep track of the hits on all the numbers. Hitting a number once is shown by placing a slash (/) beside the number, second hit by turning the slash to an X, and the third by a circle (O) around the X.

=== Scoring ===
The object is for a player to hit each number and the bullseye three times. Doubles count as two hits and triples as three. The outer bullseye counts as one and the inner bullseye as two. The first player to hit a number three times owns that number and it is said to be opened. Further hits on the opened number score that number of points (e.g. triple 20 gains 60 points), which include any possible "excess" hits from the throw that opened the number. This scoring opportunity continues until the opponent also hits that number three times and closes it, removing that number from play. The double ring scores double the number's value and the triple (inner) ring scores triple the number's value. The outer bullseye ring is worth 25 points and the inner circle (or double bull) is worth 50. Once a player has opened or closed all the required numbers and bull and has equal or more points than his opponent, that player wins. Also, if a player scores and does not record it before the next player goes, that score does not count.

Alternatively, cut-throat style scoring can be used, in which case points are undesirable; hitting a number that is opened results in points being given to any other players who do not have that number closed, and the lowest score wins.

=== Playing ===
To start the game, each player or one player from each team throws one dart. This is known as the "diddle". The player whose dart lands closest to the center goes first. Generally, if both players' darts are in the same section of the bullseye, or in the event of a tie, each player throws another dart until there is an obvious winner. During a player's turn, the player throws three darts. After the last dart, the player's score is totaled. Any number that has not been hit three times (cumulative across all turns) by a player is neither open for that player nor closed (if currently open for the opponent).

==== Example game ====
- Player 1 opens the game by throwing a triple 20, then a single 20 and a double 18.
  At the end of Player 1's turn the 20 is opened and he has scored 20 points. The 18 will require one more hit to open it.
  The Score is 20 – 0 (as the player hit an S20 after opening)
- Player 2 throws next and hits a single 20, the triple 20 and a triple 16.
  At the end of Player 2's turn the 20 is closed, but he does not score since player 1 already opened it, and the 16 is opened.
  The Score is still 20 – 0 (as player 2 closed the 20s and hitting a number that is closed does not score. The player also opened 16)
- Player 1 now tries to open the 18s but hits the S1 and the S4 and the S20.
  At the end of player 1's second turn there is no score change.
  The Score is still 20 – 0 (As only 15-20 & bull are used in Cricket and 20 was closed by player 2)
- Player 2 throws a triple 16, a single 19, and a double 19.
  At the end of player 2's second turn he has scored 48 points at the 16s and opened the 19s.
  The Score is 20 – 48.
- Player 2 can continue to score on the 16s and 19s on each of his turns until player 1 closes them.

Play continues until all of the numbers have been opened (or closed) by the higher-scoring player. If one player/team is the only one with open numbers remaining and are also leading in points, the game can be called early as it is impossible for others to catch up.

If a player strikes Triple 13, bar culture dictates the thrower takes a shot of their choice

=== Teams ===
This game can also be played by teams of 2 or even more persons. In some variations, when played with more than 2 teams, the system of points is replaced by penalty points, also known as cut-throat scoring. With penalty points the points score on every team that has not closed the number and the low point total wins the game.

== Cricket variations ==
Multiple variations exist on the standard theme of hitting each number 3 times to close, followed by scoring points on closed numbers until all players have closed a given number. Standard scoring is the norm, but Cut-throat scoring may also be used in all variations where points are used rather than runs.

=== Camden Throwdown ===
Play is the same as traditional but without scoring after closing a number. The game ends when one player closes all of the numbers listed and that player is then the winner. In this way Camden Throwdown (CT) variations can be applied to most sports and structured activities where more than half of the rules and regulations are thrown out in lieu of a simpler and more streamlined version.

=== Scram ===
The Scram variation is played with 2 players or teams. As in standard Cricket, Scram can use all the numbers on the board minus the bullseye, the numbers 15 through 20 and the bullseye, or random number selections. Like with most dart games, 3 darts are thrown each turn per player. If teams are used, turns alternate between opposing players, i.e. Team 1, Player 1 -> Team 2, Player 1 -> Team 1, Player 2 -> Team 2, Player 2, etc.

Numbers can be closed in the standard fashion i.e. hitting a single 3 times, hitting a double and a single, hitting a triple, etc. A closing variation, when using only the numbers 1-20, is a single hit on a number closes it out. Standard scoring is used, i.e. a triple 17 is worth 51 points.

Player/Team 1 starts as the "Blocker" and Player/Team 2 as the "Scorer." The Blocker throws first and attempts to close as many numbers as possible. The Scorer follows and attempts to score as many points as possible, on still open numbers, before the blocker can close all of the numbers. Once all the numbers have been closed, the round ends, and the Scorer tallies their points. The Players/Teams then switch roles and continue, with the new Blocker throwing first. The Player/Team with the most points is the winner.

=== Bowlers and Batters ===
The Bowlers and Batters variation, also known as English Cricket, uses all the numbers on the board, and is a two player/team game. Based on the bat and ball game of Cricket, one team/player will "bat" while the other "bowls". The batting side aims to accumulate as many runs as possible before the bowling side takes ten wickets. A bullseye counts as two wickets, the outer bull counts as one. If the batting side consider themselves far enough ahead, they can also declare, as in cricket. The first 40 points of the batter's score on each turn is deducted, and the remainder count as runs, so a score of 180 would add 140 runs, whereas a score of 36 would add no runs. As in field cricket, the batter and bowler roles are then switched. The winner is the side which accumulated the most runs before being bowled out.

=== Tactics ===
Tactics is the UK version of Cricket, and is almost the same as described above in Gameplay. However, Tactics, in addition to 20 through 15 and the bull's-eye, also uses Doubles and Triples as separate scoring objectives. Three of each number along with three bulls, three doubles, and three triples are required to complete the game. In addition the first player to close all objectives must have a tied score or better to win.

There are two ways of playing Tactics, 'slop' and 'strict'. In Slop Rules Tactics, all doubles and triples count, while in Strict Tactics, only the doubles and triples from 15 through 20 count.

The major tactical difference in game play between Tactics and Cricket is the introduction of Triples and Doubles as objectives. The player is offered a choice as to how these may be applied to his/her score. If 20 has been closed by only one player and that player hits the triple 20, they have the option of taking the 60 points, or applying this as one of their three required 'triple' hits. If 20 has been closed by both players, but triples have only been closed by one, that player can still use the hit to score 60 points on the triple 20. Depending on your darts, your partners darts, your opponents darts, and the stage of the game, it may be tactical to use the score one way or another.

Other versions played in Canada and in the USA are similar to the above but using the numbers 20 down through 13 and 20 through 12 respectively.
