= Steve Beaton =

English darts player (born 1964)

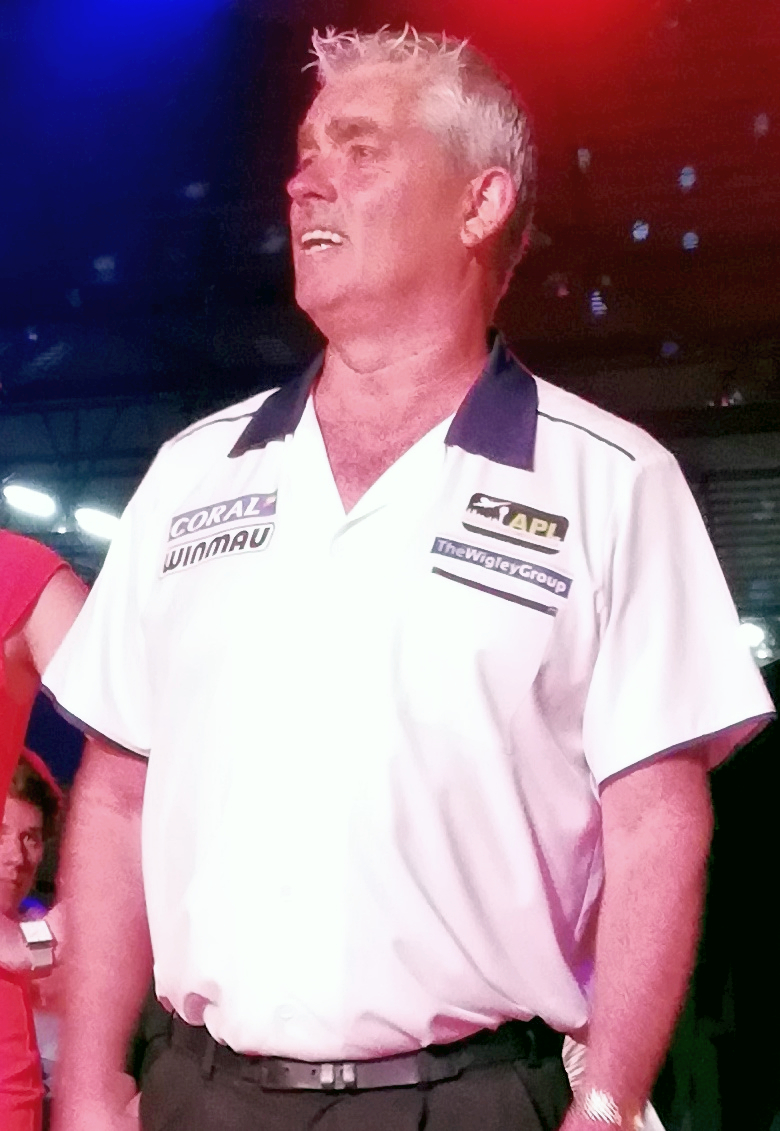
- Beaton at the 2018 Dutch Darts Masters

Personal information
- Nickname: "The Bronzed Adonis"
- Born: 5 April 1964 (age 62) Coventry, England
- Home town: North Walsham, England

Sport
- Sport: Darts
- Playing since: 1972
- Darts: 22g Winmau Signature
- Laterality: Right-handed
- Walk-on music: "Stayin' Alive" by The Bee Gees

Organisation (see split in darts)
- BDO: 1991–2001
- PDC: 2001–2024, 2026–present (Tour Card: 2011–2024)

WDF major events – best performances
- World Championship: Winner (1): 1996
- World Masters: Winner (1): 1993
- Finder Masters: Runner-up: 2000
- Dutch Open: Winner (2): 1995, 1996

PDC premier events – best performances
- World Championship: Last 16: 2002, 2004, 2020
- World Matchplay: Semi-final: 2001
- World Grand Prix: Semi-final: 2004
- UK Open: Semi-final: 2004
- Grand Slam: Semi-final: 2010
- European Championship: Runner-up: 2009
- Desert Classic: Quarter-final: 2003
- PC Finals: Quarter-final: 2017
- World Series Finals: Last 16: 2020

WSDT major events – best performances
- World Championship: Semi-final: 2025
- Champions: Preliminary round: 2025

Other tournament wins
- Years
WDF Europe Cup Singles	1994
WDF Europe Cup Team (x3)	1994, 1996, 1998
WDF World Cup Team (x3)	1993, 1995
European Tour Events
German Darts Masters	2013
Players Championships (x2)
2009, 2017

Steve Beaton (born 5 April 1964) is an English professional darts player who competes in Professional Darts Corporation (PDC) events and previously competed in British Darts Organisation (BDO), World Darts Federation (WDF), and World Seniors Darts (WSD) events. Nicknamed "the Bronzed Adonis", Beaton won the 1996 BDO World Championship. He was ranked BDO world number one in 1993 and 1994.

Before switching to the PDC in 2001, Beaton won the 1993 World Masters, the 1995 and 1996 Dutch Opens, and also achieved success in the WDF Europe Cup and WDF World Cup. In the PDC, Beaton finished as the runner-up at the 2009 European Championship. He also won three PDC Pro Tour titles, including the 2013 German Darts Masters on the European Tour. Beaton retired from professional darts at the end of 2024, handing in his PDC Tour Card. He reached the semi-finals at the 2025 World Seniors Darts Championship.

== BDO career ==
Beaton made his World Championship debut in 1992, at a time when the world darts championship was still a unified tournament. He lost in the first round to Chris Johns 1–3, but he was encouraged by his performance in the same tournament in 1993 when he achieved a huge upset win over the tournament favourite and former world champion Dennis Priestley, and he also beat another former world champion in Bob Anderson, before losing in the semi-final to Alan Warriner. He became a full-time professional later in 1993 at a time after the split, which saw the WDC players banned from all BDO tournaments – and Beaton went on to win the prestigious Winmau World Masters, beating Les Wallace in the final.

After the WDC (now PDC) players were expelled from all BDO tournaments in April 1993, it left Beaton as the top seeded player for the 1994 and 1995 BDO world championships, but he lost in the first round both times, to Nick Gedney and Dave Askew respectively, both times losing 2–3 after leading 2–0. But in 1996, he finally delivered at the BDO world championships, beating Co Stompé, John Part, Martin Adams, Andy Fordham and then Richie Burnett in the final to clinch the BDO World Championship.

When he came back to defend his world title in 1997, Beaton was within the width of the double 10 wire of reaching the final. During his tight semi-final match against Marshall James, which went all the way to a sudden death eleventh leg in the ninth and deciding set, Beaton narrowly missed a 140 checkout for the match by putting his one match dart right on the wire of the double 10, hitting the single 10. James then responded with a 106 checkout (single 20, treble 18, double 16) to win the match and end Beaton's title defence.

Beaton won many Open titles during his career in BDO tournaments including the Dutch, Danish, Belgian and Swedish Opens.

Beaton continued to play in the BDO version of the World Championship until 2001 (reaching the semi-final in 1997 and quarter-final in 1998), while also participating in some televised PDC events. When the PDC changed the eligibility rules for their televised tournaments from the start of 2002, Beaton decided to switch to playing in the PDC World Darts Championship.

== PDC career ==
Beaton has failed to reach the quarter-finals in any of his attempts at the PDC world crown, his best finishes being three Round of 16 losses in 2002, 2004 and 2020. In 2002, he was knocked out in round two by John Part 0–6. In 2004, he received a bye to the third round and was knocked out in round four by Mark Dudbridge 1–4. His form saw him slip down the PDC World Rankings at times, but he had nearly always maintained a position in the top 32, apart from some periods in 2007 and 2008 when his ranking occasionally went down to around number 40. An improvement in his form in 2009 and 2010 saw Beaton's ranking rise back into the top 32, where he stood for the following decade. Beaton has reached the semi-finals in four major PDC tournaments – the 2001 World Matchplay when he lost to Richie Burnett, the 2004 UK Open when he lost to Roland Scholten, the 2004 World Grand Prix when he lost to Alan Warriner, and the 2010 Grand Slam of Darts when he lost to Scott Waites.

Beaton saw a rise in form in the 2009 season, taking him even further up the rankings to 19th in the world. Beaton won his first title in almost nine years when he took won a Players Championship in Nuland in October. He also finished runner-up at the 2009 European Championship beating Adrian Lewis, Mark Walsh and James Wade en route to the final where he was defeated 11–3 by Phil Taylor. This result gave Beaton a place in the 2009 Grand Slam of Darts, where he progressed from the round-robin stage courtesy of wins over Co Stompé and Kevin McDine before being outplayed by Simon Whitlock.

At the 2010 Grand Slam of Darts, Beaton produced a major upset by beating three-time defending champion Phil Taylor 16–14 in the quarter-finals, having trailed 9–13 and 11–14. Earlier in the week, Beaton had needed to defeat Paul Nicholson 5–3 or better at the round robin stage to stay in the tournament (he won 5–1), and followed that up with a 10–6 win over Ted Hankey who had himself defeated Taylor in his group. Beaton was defeated by eventual champion Scott Waites 16–9 in the semi-final. He was narrowly defeated in the first round of the 2011 PDC World Darts Championship by Mark Hylton, losing by 3 sets to 2. The following year, Beaton recovered from two sets and three match darts down against Magnus Caris to win 3–2, but was beaten by Simon Whitlock 1–4 in the second round.

In the rest of the major events in 2012, Beaton could not win more than one game in any of them with his best results being last 16 exits in the World Matchplay, World Grand Prix and Players Championship Finals. On the PDC Pro Tour he lost in the semi-finals of the second Players Championship in a deciding leg to Dave Chisnall and also reached two other quarter-finals.

At the 2013 World Championship, Beaton defeated qualifier Kyle Anderson 3–0, but was then beaten 4–2 by James Wade. After the tournament, he was ranked world number 28. He reached the quarter-finals of a PDC Pro Tour event for the first time in six months in April at the seventh UK Open Qualifier, but lost 6–3 to John Part. At the UK Open itself, he lost 9–5 to Joey Palfreyman in the third round. He lost in two consecutive semi-finals in European Tour events during the year. The first of these came at the Austrian Darts Open where he missed four match darts at double 16 against Mervyn King to be edged out 6–5. The other was at the German Darts Championship where he suffered a 6–4 defeat against Dave Chisnall. He then won the German Darts Masters as he dropped only four legs in his first four games before averaging 100 in a 6–3 victory over Simon Whitlock in the semi-finals. He played Mervyn King in the final and with Beaton leading 4–3, King burst his score when on 134 by hitting a treble 20 with his final dart instead of a single to leave 40. Beaton stepped in to hit a 160 finish and, though the match went to a deciding leg, he was first to a finish to close the match out 6–5 and seal his first title for almost four years. At the World Grand Prix he missed one dart for the match in the first round against James Wade to be beaten by two sets to one. Another semi-final followed at Players Championship 12 by seeing off Gary Anderson in the quarters before losing 6–2 to Kim Huybrechts. His surge in form during the latter half of the year saw him finish eighth on the PDC Pro Tour Order of Merit to qualify for the Players Championship Finals, where he came back from 3–1 and 5–3 down against Wade in the first round to win 6–5. However, he averaged 81.41 in his next match against Wes Newton (almost 20 points lower than against Wade) and was beaten 9–3.

In the first round of the 2014 World Championship, Beaton missed four darts to move 2–0 up against Devon Petersen and was instead beaten 3–1. He lost 9–6 against Brendan Dolan in the third round of the UK Open. In June, Beaton won through to the final of the Gibraltar Darts Trophy, but he let a 4–1 lead turn into a 6–4 defeat against James Wade. He could not progress past the first round of the 2014 World Matchplay, the 2014 World Grand Prix, the 2014 European Championship or the 2014 Players Championship Finals.

In an exact reverse of their 2013 clash, Beaton was knocked out 3–0 by Kyle Anderson in the first round of the 2015 World Championship. He lost 9–5 to Peter Wright in the third round of the 2015 UK Open and the first round of both the 2015 World Matchplay (10–4 to Gary Anderson) and the 2015 World Grand Prix (2–1 in sets to Justin Pipe). Despite only winning one of his three group fixtures, Beaton qualified for the knockout stage of the Grand Slam on leg difference. He averaged almost 100 in the second round, but only had five attempts at a double as Michael van Gerwen averaged 109 in defeating Beaton 10–2.

Beaton lost 4–2 to Michael Smith in the second round of the 2016 World Championship. He played in his first final since 2014 at the sixth UK Open Qualifier and was beaten 6–2 by Van Gerwen. He also made the final of [[2016 PDC Players Championship series#Players Championship 10{Players Championship 10]], but lost 6–2 to Dave Chisnall. Beaton got to the quarter-finals of the 2016 World Matchplay, which was his best performance since 2001, by defeating Jelle Klaasen 10–6 and Smith 11–7. He lost 16–13 to Gary Anderson after fighting back from 9–4 down to level the match at 12–12 before eventually succumbing to the two-time reigning world champion. After Beaton took the opening set with a 135 finish in the first round of the World Grand Prix, van Gerwen won six unanswered legs to win 2–1. He lost 6–4 to Jeffrey de Graaf in the first round of the Players Championship Finals.

Beaton failed to progress to the third round at the World Championship for the 12th year in a row when he was beaten 4–1 by James Wade in the second round of the 2017 event. In 2017, Beaton won the 13th players championship event of the year defeating Gary Anderson 6–3 in the final. In the Players Championship Finals, Beaton reached the quarter final by winning against Ronny Huybrechts, Jelle Klaasen and Jermaine Wattimena. In the quarter final, he lost 8–10 to Jonny Clayton.

=== 2018 ===
In the 2018 World Championship, Beaton won 3–1 in the first round against William O'Connor but was eliminated in the second round 0–4 by Vincent van der Voort.

=== 2024 ===
Beaton announced in December 2023, that 2024 would be his final year playing professional darts, and that he would retire at the end of the year.

At the 2024 PDC World Championship, his final World Championship appearance, Beaton won his first-round game 3–1 against Wessel Nijman, but lost to Daryl Gurney 3–1 in the second round.

At his final UK Open event in 2024, Beaton reached the third round before losing there to Josh Payne 5–6.

Beaton qualified for a single European Tour event in the season at the 2024 German Darts Championship, where he suffered an early exit against Dylan Slevin in the first round.

Beaton reached the semi-finals at Players Championship 18, losing to eventual runner-up Ryan Searle 7–4. At his final Pro Tour appearance ever at the Mattioli Arena, Beaton received a standing ovation from everyone inside the venue. To celebrate his career, fellow professional players on the circuit, Chris Dobey, Andy Boulton, Ross Smith, Nathan Aspinall, Joe Cullen, Adam Hunt, Ryan Joyce, Jonny Clayton, and John Henderson all dressed up as Beaton from when he used to play in the 1990s as a celebration for what he has accomplished for the sport. Beaton lost in the first round, losing in a deciding leg to Niels Zonneveld.

For the first time since his debut in 2003, Beaton failed to qualify for the 2025 PDC World Championship, having finished the season outside the top 32 on both the PDC Order of Merit ranking and the Pro Tour ranking, and not progressing through the Tour Card Holder Qualifier, meaning the 2024 event was his final professional world championship appearance.

=== 2026 ===
In January 2026, Beaton took part in PDC Q-School to try and regain his tour card, but was unsuccessful.

Following the conclusion of Q-School, Beaton immediately joined the PDC Challenge Tour. He reached the quarterfinals at Challenge Tour 3, where he lost to the eventual winner Joe Hunt 5–2.

== WSD career ==
Following his retirement from professional darts, Beaton accepted an invite to play at the 2025 World Seniors Darts Championship. He made it all the way to the semi-finals, before bowing out to the eventual winner, Ross Montgomery. He would suffer an early round exit at the 2025 World Seniors Champion of Champions to former BDO Women's World Champion, Trina Gulliver 5–2.

Beaton was scheduled to face Vincent van der Voort at the 2025 World Seniors Matchplay in November. However, the WSD announced that the tournament was cancelled, after the organisation folded in August.

== MODUS career ==
Beaton has also competed in the MODUS Super Series after handing in his Tour Card in December 2024.

He first competed in Series 10 Week 11 in April, where he made it to finals nights, but lost in the final to David Evans in a deciding leg 4–3.

Beaton repeated the feat in Series 11 Week 11 in July by reaching the final again, but recorded a 4–0 whitewash loss to Jurjen van der Velde.

Beaton also paired up with former back-to-back PDC World Champion Adrian Lewis, to represent England at the second edition of the MODUS Super Series International Pairs tournament in August. The pair failed to make it to finals night after losing a crucial game to the Swedish team of Andreas Harrysson and Anton Östlund and were eliminated on leg difference in their group.

Beaton returned to compete in Series 12 Week 5 in September, where he made it to finals night for a third consecutive time, but was eliminated from his group after losing a 9 dart shootout to Johnny Haines and eventual weekly winner and Series 10 Champion Jenson Walker.

At Series 13 Week 11 in April, Beaton narrowly missed out on qualifying for finals nights in his group.

Beaton partnered 2022 Women's World Matchplay champion Fallon Sherrock in the England team at the third edition of the MODUS Super Series International Pairs tournament. The pair managed to win just one game in the group over the Scottish pairing of Scott Campbell and Jim McEwan and finished in last place.

== Public image ==
Throughout his career, Beaton was seen as something of a sex symbol within darts; during his 1993 World Championship run, commentator Sid Waddell commented that he was "built like Adonis", and his tanned appearance led to him earning the nickname "the Bronzed Adonis". He has stated in interviews that he has never used a tanning bed, instead attributing his tan to time spent in the Canary Islands. His entrance music was "Stayin' Alive" by the Bee Gees.

Beaton was frequently compared to actor Tom Selleck due to his mullet haircut and moustache, which saw him briefly adopt the nickname "Magnum", after Selleck's Magnum, P.I. character Thomas Magnum. He also used the nickname "the Marathon Man" after taking up marathon running.

== Personal life ==
Beaton was born in Coventry, Warwickshire, England. He currently resides in North Walsham, Norfolk, with his wife Nanette, whom he married in 1993.

He is a fan of English football club Coventry City.

== World Championship record ==
=== BDO World Championship ===
- 1992: First round (lost to Chris Johns 1–3) (sets)
- 1993: Semi-finals (lost to Alan Warriner 2–5)
- 1994: First round (lost to Nick Gedney 2–3)
- 1995: First round (lost to Dave Askew 2–3)
- 1996: Winner (beat Richie Burnett 6–3)
- 1997: Semi-finals (lost to Marshall James 4–5)
- 1998: Quarter-finals (lost to Raymond van Barneveld 0–5)
- 1999: First round (lost to Steve Duke 0–3)
- 2000: Second round (lost to Andy Fordham 0–3)
- 2001: Second round (lost to Raymond van Barneveld 2–3)

=== PDC World Championship ===
- 2002: Second round (lost to John Part 0–6)
- 2003: Second round (lost to Dave Askew 3–4)
- 2004: Fourth round (lost to Mark Dudbridge 1–4)
- 2005: Third round (lost to Andy Hamilton 2–4)
- 2006: First round (lost to Jan van der Rassel 0–3)
- 2007: Second round (lost to Terry Jenkins 3–4)
- 2008: Second round (lost to James Wade 3–4)
- 2009: First round (lost to Alan Tabern 0–3)
- 2010: Second round (lost to Andy Hamilton 1–4)
- 2011: First round (lost to Mark Hylton 2–3)
- 2012: Second round (lost to Simon Whitlock 1–4)
- 2013: Second round (lost to James Wade 2–4)
- 2014: First round (lost to Devon Petersen 1–3)
- 2015: First round (lost to Kyle Anderson 0–3)
- 2016: Second round (lost to Michael Smith 2–4)
- 2017: Second round (lost to James Wade 1–4)
- 2018: Second round (lost to Vincent van der Voort 0–4)
- 2019: Second round (lost to Chris Dobey 0–3)
- 2020: Fourth round (lost to Darius Labanauskas 2–4)
- 2021: First round (lost to Diogo Portela 0–3)
- 2022: Second round (lost to Kim Huybrechts 1–3)
- 2023: First round (lost to Danny van Trijp 0–3)
- 2024: Second round (lost to Daryl Gurney 1–3)

=== World Seniors Championship ===
- 2025: Semi-finals (lost to Ross Montgomery 1–3)

== Performance timeline ==
Beaton's performance timeline is as follows:

=== BDO ===
Tournament	1984	1987	1989	1990	1992	1993	1994	1995	1996	1997	1998	1999	2000	2001	2002
BDO World Championship	Did not participate				1R	SF	1R	1R	W	SF	QF	1R	2R	2R	PDC
World Masters	3R	DNP	2R	DNP	QF	W	F	2R	1R	3R	4R	4R	3R	2R	SF
European Masters	Not held							QF	Not held						
Zuiderduin Masters	Not held												F	PDC	
News of the World Darts Championship	DNP	QF	DNP	RR	Not held					DNP	Not held				

=== WSD ===
Tournament	2025
World Seniors Televised events
World Championship	SF
Champion of Champions	1R

=== PDC ===
Tournament	1998	2001	2002	2003	2004	2005	2006	2007	2008	2009	2010	2011		2012	2013	2014	2015	2016	2017	2018	2019	2020	2021	2022	2023	2024
PDC Ranked televised events
World Championship	BDO		2R	2R	4R	3R	1R	2R	2R	1R	2R	1R		2R	2R	1R	1R	2R	2R	2R	2R	4R	1R	2R	1R	2R
UK Open	Not held			5R	SF	3R	2R	4R	2R	2R	3R	4R		Prel.	3R	3R	3R	3R	3R	3R	QF	4R	3R	3R	5R	3R
World Matchplay	QF	SF	1R	1R	2R	1R	1R	1R	1R	2R	2R	2R		2R	1R	1R	1R	QF	1R	1R	1R	1R	DNQ		1R	DNQ
World Grand Prix	BDO	2R	1R	1R	SF	QF	2R	DNQ	1R	2R	DNQ			2R	1R	1R	1R	1R	2R	2R	1R	DNQ				
European Championship	Not held								DNQ	F	DNQ					1R	DNQ		1R	1R	1R	DNQ				
Players Championship Finals	Not held									1R	2R	2R	1R	2R	2R	1R	1R	1R	QF	2R	1R	1R	1R	1R	1R	DNQ
PDC Non-ranked televised events
World Series Finals	Not held																DNQ	1R	DNQ	1R	DNQ	2R	DNQ			
Grand Slam (Note: A ranked event from 2015)	Not held							DNQ		2R	SF	2R		RR	DNQ		2R	DNQ								
PDC Past major events
Las Vegas Desert Classic	Not held		DNQ	QF	1R	DNQ	1R	2R	DNQ		Not held															
Career statistics
Year-end ranking	NR	10	Not ranked		14	17	27	30	33	19	24	28		30	22	21	25	27	25	20	25	33	50	55	49	56

==== European Tour ====
Season	1	2	3	4	5	6	7	8	9	10	11	12	13
2012	ADO; 2R	GDC; 1R	EDO; 3R	GDM; 2R	DDM; 2R								
2013	UKM; 1R	EDT; 1R	EDO; 1R	ADO; SF	GDT; QF	GDC; SF	GDM; W	DDM; 1R					
2014	GDC; 2R	DDM; 2R	GDM; QF	ADO; 3R	GDT; F	EDO; 2R	EDG; 3R	EDT; 2R					
2015	GDC; 3R	GDT; 2R	GDM; 2R	DDM; 3R	IDO; 3R	EDO; 2R	EDT; DNQ	EDM; DNQ	EDG; 3R				
2016	DDM; DNQ	GDM; 1R	GDT; 1R	EDM; DNQ	ADO; 3R	Did not qualify			EDG; 3R	GDC; DNQ			
2017	Did not qualify			EDG; 1R	GDT; 2R	Did not qualify			DDM; F	GDG; 1R	IDO; 1R	EDT; DNQ	
2018	EDO; 1R	GDG; DNQ	GDO; 2R	ADO; 3R	EDG; DNQ	DDM; 2R	GDT; DNQ	DDO; 2R	EDM; 2R	GDC; 2R	DDC; DNQ	IDO; 3R	EDT; 3R
2019	EDO; 2R	GDC; 1R	GDG; 1R	GDO; 2R	ADO; QF	EDG; SF	DDM; 2R	DDO; 1R	CDO; 2R	ADC; 2R	EDM; DNQ	IDO; 3R	GDT; 2R
2020	BDC; 2R	Did not qualify											
2021	HDT; 1R	GDT; 1R											
2022	Did not qualify			ADO; 1R	Did not qualify						GDO; 3R	BDO; 1R	GDT; 2R
2023	BSD; QF	EDO; DNQ	IDO; DNQ	GDG; 2R	ADO; DNQ	DDC; 2R	BDO; DNQ	CDO; 2R	EDG; 2R	Did not qualify			
2024	Did not qualify								GDC; 1R	Did not qualify			

==== Players Championships ====
Season	1	2	3	4	5	6	7	8	9	10	11	12	13	14	15	16	17	18	19	20	21	22	23	24	25	26	27	28	29	30	31	32	33	34			
2009	DON; 4R	GIB; QF	GIB; SF	GLA; 4R	GLA; 4R	IRV; 4R	WIG; 4R	BRE; QF	COV; QF	NUL; 4R	NUL; 4R	TAU; 2R	DER; 1R	NWP; 3R	BAR; QF	BAR; QF	DIN; QF	DIN; 4R	LVE; 2R	SYD; DNP	ONT; 3R	ATL; 2R	ATL; F	SAL; 3R	SAL; 4R	DUB; 3R	DUB; 4R	KIL; 3R	NUL; W	NUL; 4R	SCO; F	SCO; SF					
2010	GIB; 1R	GIB; 2R	SWI; 1R	DER; 2R	GLA; 3R	GLA; 4R	WIG; 1R	CRA; 1R	BAR; 3R	DER; 1R	WIG; 4R	WIG; 3R	SAL; F	SAL; 3R	BAR; 4R	BAR; 2R	HAA; 4R	HAA; 1R	LVE; 1R	LVE; 2R	LVE; 4R	SYD; 2R	ONT; 4R	ONT; 3R	CRA; 2R	CRA; 4R	NUL; 4R	NUL; 2R	DUB; 3R	DUB; SF	KIL; 4R	BNA; 3R	BNA; 4R	BAR; SF	BAR; 2R	DER; QF	DER; 4R
2011	HAL; 2R	HAL; 4R	DER; 1R	DER; 2R	CRA; 3R	CRA; 1R	VIE; 3R	VIE; 2R	CRA; 1R	CRA; 2R	BAR; 3R	BAR; QF	NUL; 4R	NUL; QF	ONT; QF	ONT; 4R	DER; 4R	DER; 2R	NUL; 3R	NUL; 4R	DUB; 4R	DUB; QF	KIL; 4R	GLA; 1R	GLA; 4R	ALI; 4R	ALI; 4R	CRA; 4R	CRA; QF	WIG; SF	WIG; QF						
2012	ALI; 4R	ALI; 3R	REA; 2R	REA; SF	CRA; 2R	CRA; 1R	BIR; 3R	BIR; QF	CRA; 1R	CRA; 4R	BAR; 1R	BAR; 1R	DUB; 1R	DUB; 2R	KIL; QF	KIL; 3R	CRA; 3R	CRA; 4R	BAR; 3R	BAR; 3R																	
2013	WIG; 1R	WIG; 3R	WIG; 3R	WIG; QF	CRA; 2R	CRA; 2R	BAR; 3R	BAR; 1R	DUB; 3R	DUB; 2R	KIL; QF	KIL; SF	WIG; 4R	WIG; QF	BAR; 4R	BAR; QF																					
2014	BAR; 3R	BAR; 3R	CRA; 4R	CRA; 4R	WIG; 2R	WIG; 2R	WIG; 1R	WIG; 1R	CRA; 4R	CRA; 1R	COV; 3R	COV; 3R	CRA; QF	CRA; 4R	DUB; 4R	DUB; 2R	CRA; QF	CRA; 4R	COV; 2R	COV; 1R																	
2015	BAR; 1R	BAR; 1R	BAR; 3R	BAR; 4R	BAR; 2R	COV; 4R	COV; 1R	COV; 2R	CRA; 1R	CRA; 1R	BAR; 3R	BAR; 1R	WIG; 3R	WIG; 3R	BAR; 1R	BAR; 4R	DUB; 2R	DUB; 1R	COV; 1R	COV; 1R																	
2016	BAR; 1R	BAR; 1R	BAR; 4R	BAR; 3R	BAR; 2R	BAR; 1R	BAR; 1R	COV; 2R	COV; SF	BAR; F	BAR; 4R	BAR; QF	BAR; 3R	BAR; 2R	BAR; 1R	BAR; 1R	DUB; QF	DUB; 2R	BAR; 3R	BAR; 1R																	
2017	BAR; 3R	BAR; 2R	BAR; 2R	BAR; 3R	MIL; QF	MIL; 4R	BAR; 2R	BAR; 3R	WIG; 1R	WIG; 1R	MIL; 3R	MIL; 1R	WIG; W	WIG; 1R	BAR; 3R	BAR; SF	BAR; 4R	BAR; 1R	DUB; 1R	DUB; 1R	BAR; 1R	BAR; 1R															
2018	BAR; 2R	BAR; 2R	BAR; 2R	BAR; 1R	MIL; 2R	MIL; 3R	BAR; 1R	BAR; 3R	WIG; 3R	WIG; 4R	MIL; 2R	MIL; 4R	WIG; 2R	WIG; 1R	BAR; SF	BAR; SF	BAR; 3R	BAR; QF	DUB; 3R	DUB; 1R	BAR; SF	BAR; 4R															
2019	WIG; 1R	WIG; 1R	WIG; 1R	WIG; 3R	BAR; 3R	BAR; 1R	WIG; 1R	WIG; 1R	BAR; QF	BAR; 3R	BAR; 2R	BAR; 4R	BAR; 4R	BAR; 2R	BAR; 4R	BAR; 2R	WIG; 2R	WIG; 3R	BAR; 1R	BAR; QF	HIL; 1R	HIL; QF	BAR; 2R	BAR; 2R	BAR; 2R	BAR; 2R	DUB; 1R	DUB; 1R	BAR; 3R	BAR; 3R							
2020	BAR; QF	BAR; 3R	WIG; 2R	WIG; 1R	WIG; 1R	WIG; QF	BAR; 1R	BAR; 1R	MIL; 4R	MIL; 1R	MIL; 1R	MIL; 1R	MIL; 2R	NIE; 1R	NIE; 2R	NIE; 2R	NIE; 2R	NIE; 2R	COV; 2R	COV; 1R	COV; 1R	COV; 1R	COV; 1R														
2021	BOL; 2R	BOL; QF	BOL; 2R	BOL; 1R	MIL; 2R	MIL; 1R	MIL; 3R	MIL; 3R	NIE; 2R	NIE; 2R	NIE; 2R	NIE; 3R	MIL; 4R	MIL; 2R	MIL; 1R	MIL; QF	COV; 1R	COV; 2R	COV; 2R	COV; 1R	BAR; 1R	BAR; 1R	BAR; 1R	BAR; 1R	BAR; 2R	BAR; 1R	BAR; 1R	BAR; 1R	BAR; 3R	BAR; 1R							
2022	BAR; 1R	BAR; 1R	WIG; 2R	WIG; 1R	BAR; 4R	BAR; 1R	NIE; 1R	NIE; 1R	BAR; 2R	BAR; 1R	BAR; 4R	BAR; 2R	BAR; 2R	WIG; 1R	WIG; 1R	NIE; 3R	NIE; 4R	BAR; 1R	BAR; 1R	BAR; QF	BAR; 2R	BAR; 1R	BAR; 1R	BAR; 3R	BAR; 1R	BAR; 1R	BAR; 3R	BAR; 4R	BAR; 1R	BAR; F							
2023	BAR; 3R	BAR; 2R	BAR; 1R	BAR; 1R	BAR; 1R	BAR; 2R	HIL; 3R	HIL; 1R	WIG; 1R	WIG; 1R	LEI; 1R	LEI; 3R	HIL; 2R	HIL; 3R	LEI; 3R	LEI; 2R	HIL; 1R	HIL; 1R	BAR; 1R	BAR; 2R	BAR; 3R	BAR; 1R	BAR; 2R	BAR; 3R	BAR; 3R	BAR; 1R	BAR; 3R	BAR; 1R	BAR; 3R	BAR; 2R							
2024	WIG; 2R	WIG; 1R	LEI; 1R	LEI; 1R	HIL; 2R	HIL; 3R	LEI; 1R	LEI; 1R	HIL; 2R	HIL; 2R	HIL; 1R	HIL; 2R	MIL; 1R	MIL; 2R	MIL; 1R	MIL; 2R	MIL; 2R	MIL; SF	MIL; 1R	WIG; 2R	WIG; 1R	LEI; 1R	LEI; 2R	WIG; 1R	WIG; 2R	WIG; 1R	WIG; 2R	WIG; 2R	LEI; 1R	LEI; 1R							

Performance Table Legend
W	Won the tournament	F	Finalist	SF	Semifinalist	QF	Quarterfinalist	#R; RR; Prel.	Lost in # round Round-robin; Preliminary round	DQ	Disqualified
DNQ	Did not qualify	DNP	Did not participate	WD	Withdrew	NH	Tournament not held	#R; RR; Prel.	Lost in # round Round-robin; Preliminary round	NYF	Not yet founded

== Career finals ==
=== BDO and WDF major finals: 4 (2 titles) ===
Legend
World Championship (1–0)
World Masters (1–1)
Zuiderduin Masters (0–1)

Outcome	No.	Year	Championship	Opponent in the final	Score (Note: (l) = score in legs, (s) = score in sets.)
Winner	1.	1993	World Masters	(Scotland) Les Wallace	3–1 (s)
Runner-up	1.	1994	World Masters	(Wales) Richie Burnett	2–3 (s)
Winner	2.	1996	World Championship	(Wales) Richie Burnett	6–3 (s)
Runner-up	2.	2000	Zuiderduin Masters	(England) Martin Adams	4–5 (s)

=== PDC major finals: 1 ===
Outcome	No.	Year	Championship	Opponent in the final	Score
Runner-up	1.	2009	European Championship	Phil Taylor	3–11 (l)
