= Matt Clark (darts player) =

English darts player (born 1968)

Personal information
- Nickname: "Superman"
- Born: 4 April 1968 (age 58) Dartford, England
- Home town: Walkden, Lancashire, England

Sport
- Sport: Darts
- Playing since: 1988
- Darts: 22g
- Laterality: Right-handed
- Walk-on music: "Superman Theme" by John Williams

Organisation (see split in darts)
- BDO: 1996–2003, 2018–2019
- PDC: 2003–2017, 2019–2022 (Tour Card: 2011–2013; 2016-2017; 2019–2020)
- WDF: 2025–

WDF major events – best performances
- World Championship: Quarter-final: 1996
- World Masters: Last 32: 1996, 1998
- World Trophy: Last 32: 2002
- Int. Darts League: Last 16 Group: 2003
- Finder Masters: Last 16 Group: 2000, 2001

PDC premier events – best performances
- World Championship: Last 32: 2006
- World Matchplay: Quarter-final: 2008
- UK Open: Last 32: 2006
- Desert Classic: Last 16: 2006
- US Open/WSoD: Last 32: 2007, 2009

Other tournament wins
- Years
Mill Rythe Darts Festival	1995
British Internationals	1998
Canadian Open	1999
Open Holland	2008
PDC World Championship Qualifier	2013
PDC Challenge Tour	2014, 2015
Modus Super Series 2 Week 10 Winner	2023
Modus Super Series 3 Week 6 Winner	2023
Modus Super Series 5 Week 1 Winner	2023
WSDT Target Open Series	2024
Gibraltar Classic	2026

Matthew Clark (born 4 April 1968) is an English professional darts player who competes in World Darts Federation (WDF) events. He previously competed in the British Darts Organisation (BDO) and Professional Darts Corporation (PDC), holding a PDC Tour Card on several occasions. Nicknamed "Superman", he reached the quarter-finals of the 1996 BDO World Darts Championship and the 2008 World Matchplay. He has also won two PDC Challenge Tour titles and the 2026 Gibraltar Classic.

== Darting history ==
=== Early career and BDO ===
Clark began playing darts at the age of 19, initially competing in local pubs before representing Kent at county level. He made his first significant impression on the international circuit in 1993, reaching the quarter-finals of the Dutch Open, where he lost to Phil Taylor. He won the Mill Rythe Darts Festival in 1995 and reached the final of the Finnish Open in 1996, losing to Martin Adams. He later won the Canadian Open in 1999.

Clark made his debut at the BDO World Darts Championship in 1996. He defeated Paul Hogan 3–2 in the first round and Raymond van Barneveld 3–1 in the second round before losing 4–1 to Les Wallace in the quarter-finals. This remained his best performance at the Lakeside World Championship. He subsequently appeared in seven consecutive editions between 1997 and 2003, reaching the second round in 2000 and 2001.

During his BDO career, Clark also competed in the World Masters, Zuiderduin Masters, World Darts Trophy and International Darts League. Among his other achievements was victory at the 1999 Canadian Open and the 2008 Open Holland.

=== PDC career ===
Clark switched to the Professional Darts Corporation in 2004 and established himself among the world's top 32 players. He reached a semi-final on the PDC Pro Tour in 2005 and qualified for his first PDC World Darts Championship in 2006. After winning his opening match, he was defeated 4–1 by eventual champion Phil Taylor in the second round. He returned to the World Championship in 2007, entering as the 31st seed, but lost to Mick McGowan in the first round.

At the 2008 PDC World Darts Championship, Clark lost 3–2 to Roland Scholten in the first round despite winning more legs than his opponent, 12 to 10. Later that year, he qualified for the World Matchplay through the Players Championship Order of Merit. He defeated Scholten 10–4 in the opening round and Peter Manley 13–6 in the second round to reach the quarter-finals. His run ended with a 16–12 defeat to defending champion James Wade, although Clark recorded a 161 checkout, the highest of the tournament.

Clark suffered another narrow defeat at the 2009 PDC World Darts Championship, losing 3–2 to Kevin Painter in a deciding leg of the final set. He missed one dart at double 12 to win the match before Painter secured victory. In February 2010, Clark threw a nine-dart finish against Dave Askew during a Players Championship event in Gibraltar.

Following several less successful seasons, Clark qualified for the 2014 PDC World Darts Championship by winning the PDPA World Championship Qualifier in November 2013. He defeated Ian Moss in the final to secure a place in the first round, where he subsequently lost 3–1 to Vincent van der Voort.

=== Challenge Tour and return to the PDC ===
After losing his PDC Tour Card, Clark competed on the PDC Challenge Tour. He won his first title at the final event of the 2014 season in Wigan and finished sixth on the Challenge Tour Order of Merit with £4,550 in prize money. He added a second title at Challenge Tour Event 6 in Wigan on 30 May 2015, defeating Richie Corner 5–2 in the final.

In 2015, Clark also qualified for the 2015 International Darts Open, where he defeated John Henderson in the opening round before losing 6–0 to Peter Wright. He regained his PDC Tour Card through the 2016 Qualifying School Order of Merit and competed on the Pro Tour for the following two seasons. During this period, he reached the second round of both the 2017 European Darts Grand Prix and the 2017 Gibraltar Darts Trophy, but lost his Tour Card again at the end of 2017.

In 2018, Clark returned to the Challenge Tour while also participating in BDO events. He reached the final of the Luxembourg Masters and recorded a quarter-final finish on the Challenge Tour. After narrowly missing qualification for the BDO World Championship, he entered the PDC Qualifying School again in January 2019.

On 19 January 2019, Clark regained his Tour Card by progressing through the third day of the UK Qualifying School in Wigan. He defeated Keith Rooney and James Kempster before beating Gavin Carlin 5–2 in the decisive match, averaging over 104. The victory secured him a two-year Tour Card for the 2019 and 2020 seasons.

Clark reached the second round of the 2019 UK Open after defeating Niels Zonneveld. He also qualified for the 2019 Gibraltar Darts Trophy, where he was eliminated by Ryan Joyce. During qualification for that event, he recorded another nine-dart finish, against Reece Robinson, on 20 September 2019.

On 25 April 2020, Clark participated in the inaugural PDC Home Tour, competing in Group Nine alongside Michael Smith, Martijn Kleermaker and Harry Ward. He defeated Ward and Kleermaker, both by 5–3, but lost 5–3 to Smith. Despite recording two wins from three matches, he finished third in the group on leg difference. Clark lost his PDC Tour Card at the end of 2020 and was unsuccessful in regaining it at the 2021 Qualifying School.

=== MODUS Super Series and seniors career ===
After leaving the professional PDC circuit, Clark continued competing in independent events, including the MODUS Super Series. In January 2023, he won Week Ten of Series Two, defeating Kevin Painter 4–0 in the final to qualify for Champions Week. He subsequently reached the Series Two championship final in February, where he lost 4–3 to Raymond Smith. Clark secured another weekly title in August 2023, defeating Wayne Jones 4–2 in the opening week of Series Five.

Clark also became active on the World Seniors Darts Tour (WSDT). In February 2024, he won a qualifying event to secure his debut at the 2024 World Seniors Darts Championship, where he was defeated 3–1 by Scott Mitchell in the first round.

On 8 June 2024, Clark won Target Open Series Event 11 in Newbury, his first tournament victory on the World Seniors Darts Tour. His performances earned him qualification for the 2024 World Seniors Darts Matchplay, where he lost 8–6 to Martin Adams. At the 2024 World Seniors Darts Masters, Clark defeated Lisa Ashton 4–2 in the opening round before losing 4–0 to eventual champion John Henderson in the quarter-finals.

=== Return to the WDF circuit ===
In 2025, Clark returned to regular WDF competition. He reached the final of the England National Singles in June, losing 5–1 to Jim McEwan. In August, he reached consecutive finals at the Antwerp Open and Belgium Open, losing both to Jimmy van Schie.

His results secured him a seeded place at the 2025 WDF World Darts Championship, marking his first appearance at a world championship since 2014. Seeded seventh, Clark defeated Haruki Muramatsu 3–1 in the second round before losing 3–1 to François Schweyen in the last 16. It was his first appearance at the Lakeside World Championship since 2003.

In July 2026, Clark won the WDF Silver-ranked Gibraltar Classic, defeating Mitchell Lawrie 4–2 in the semi-finals before beating Jenson Walker 5–4 in the final. It was his first WDF ranking title since the 2008 Open Holland. Later that month, he reached the last 16 of the WDF World Masters, where he lost 5–4 to Sean Fisher.

== World Championship results ==
=== BDO/WDF ===
- 1996: Quarter Final (lost to Les Wallace 1–4)
- 1997: 1st Round (lost to Andy Fordham 2–3)
- 1998: 1st Round (lost to Mervyn King 0–3)
- 1999: 1st Round (lost to Paul Williams 2–3)
- 2000: 2nd Round (lost to Chris Mason 2–3)
- 2001: 2nd Round (lost to Kevin Painter 1–3)
- 2002: 1st Round (lost to Marko Pusa 1–3)
- 2003: 1st Round (lost to Raymond van Barneveld 1–3)
- 2025: 3rd Round (lost to François Schweyen 1–3)

=== PDC ===
- 2006: 2nd Round (lost to Phil Taylor 1–4)
- 2007: 1st Round (lost to Mick McGowan 1–3)
- 2008: 1st Round (lost to Roland Scholten 2–3)
- 2009: 1st Round (lost to Kevin Painter 2–3)
- 2010: 1st Round (lost to Mervyn King 0–3)
- 2014: 1st Round (lost to Vincent van der Voort 1–3)

== Performance timeline ==
=== BDO ===
Tournament	1995	1996	1997	1998	1999	2000	2001	2002	2003	2018
BDO ranked televised events
World Championship	DNQ	QF	1R	1R	1R	2R	2R	1R	1R	PDC
World Masters	Prel.	3R	DNQ	3R	1R	2R	2R	2R	DNP	3R
Finder Darts Masters	Not held					RR	RR	DNP		NH
World Darts Trophy	Not held							1R	DNP	NH
International Darts League	Not held								RR	NH

=== WSDT ===
Tournament	2024
WSDT major events
World Championship	1R
World Matchplay	1R
World Masters	QF

=== WDF ===
Tournament	1993	2025	2026
WDF ranked major events
World Championship	NH	3R	
World Masters	DNP	2R	3R
Dutch Open	QF	DNP	

=== PDC ===
Tournament	2004	2005	2006	2007	2008	2009	2010	2011	2012	2013	2014	2015	2016	2017	2018	2019	2020
PDC Ranked televised events
World Championship	DNP	DNQ	2R	1R	1R	1R	1R	Did not qualify			1R	Did not qualify					
UK Open	3R	4R	4R	3R	3R	2R	3R	2R	1R	DNQ	1R	1R	3R	DNQ	DNP	2R	2R
World Matchplay	DNQ	1R	1R	DNQ	QF	Did not qualify											
PDC Past major events
Las Vegas Desert Classic	DNQ		2R	DNQ	1R	DNQ	Not held										
US Open	Not held			4R	DNQ	Not held											
Career statistics
Year-end ranking	–	31	31	39	36	40	47	55	94	92	97	116	93	81	-	111	102

==== PDC European Tour ====
Season	1	2	3	4	5	6	7	8	9	10	11	12	13
2013	DNQ		EDO; 1R	DNQ		GDC; 1R	DNQ	DNP					
2014	DNQ				GDT; 1R	DNQ	EDG; 2R	DNQ					
2015	DNQ				IDO; 2R	DNQ			DNP				
2017	DNQ			EDG; 2R	GDT; 2R	DNQ		EDO; 1R	DNQ				
2019	Did not qualify												GDT; 1R

==== PDC Players Championships ====
Season	1	2	3	4	5	6	7	8	9	10	11	12	13	14	15	16	17	18	19	20	21	22	23	24	25	26	27	28	29	30	31	32	33	34	35	36	37
2003	BLA; SF																																				
2004	BLA ?	DNP	DUB; QF	ROT; 3R	EDI; 3R																																
2005	IOW; 3R	DNP		NEW; 1R	DNP	IRV; 1R	LIS; 4R	LIS; 3R																													
2006	GIB; 2R	HAY; 2R	HAY; 2R	BLA; 2R	NEW; 1R	DUB; 4R	IRV; 1R	LIS; 3R	LIS; 3R																												
2007	GIB; 4R	GIB; 1R	BSO; 3R	ANT; 2R	SCH; 4R	HEE; 3R	HAY; 3R	HAY; 1R	LVG; 1R	BLA; 1R	ATL; 3R	KIL; 1R	CHI; 3R	NEW; 2R	DNP	IRV; 2R	KIR; 3R	KIL; 3R	LIS; 4R	LIS; 2R																	
2008	GIB; 1R	GIB; 3R	BRE; 1R	WIG; 2R	BSO; 1R	BSO; 4R	TEL; 4R	ANT; 2R	GLA; 2R	SCH; 4R	BRI; SF	BRI; 2R	LVG; 2R	BLA; 2R	DNP	KIT; 4R	ATL; 3R	VEL; 3R	VEL; 3R	KIL; 3R	CHI; 4R	NEW; QF	NEW; 3R	DUB; 2R	DUB; 2R	DNP	IRV; 3R	DIN; 3R	KIL; QF	LEI; 2R	LEI; 2R						
2009	DON; 1R	GIB; 2R	GIB; 2R	GLA; 3R	GLA; QF	IRV; 2R	WIG; 3R	BRE; 2R	COV; 4R	NUL; 4R	NUL; 3R	TAU; 2R	DER; 1R	NEW; 2R	BAR; 1R	BAR; 1R	DIN; 3R	DIN; 3R	LVG; 2R	DNP	LON; 4R	ATL; 3R	SAL; 1R	SAL; 1R	DUB; 2R	DUB; 2R	KIL; 3R	NUL; 2R	NUL; 2R	IRV; 2R	IRV; 1R						
2010	GIB; 2R	GIB; 2R	SWI; 2R	DER; 1R	GLA; 4R	GLA; 3R	WIG; 1R	CRA; 1R	BAR; 1R	DER; 1R	WIG; 2R	WIG; 1R	SAL; 1R	SAL; 1R	BAR; 1R	BAR; 1R	HAA; 1R	HAA; 2R	LVG; 2R	LVG; 1R	LVG; SF	DNP	LON; 2R	LON; 3R	CRA; 1R	CRA; 1R	NUL; 2R	NUL; 2R	DUB; 4R	DUB; 2R	KIL; 3R	BAD; 3R	BAD; 1R	DNP	BAR; 1R	DER; 1R	DER; 1R
2011	Did not participate				CRA; 1R	CRA; 3R	DNP		CRA; 1R	CRA; 1R	BAR; 2R	BAR; 4R	NUL; 1R	NUL; 1R	DNP		DER; 2R	DER; 3R	NUL; 1R	NUL; 4R	Did not participate							CRA; SF	CRA; 2R	WIG; 1R	WIG; 2R						
2012	BEN; 2R	BEN; SF	REA; 1R	REA; 1R	CRA; 1R	CRA; 3R	BIR; 1R	BIR; 3R	CRA; 1R	CRA; 1R	BAR; 2R	BAR; 1R	Did not participate				CRA; 2R	CRA; 1R	BAR; 2R	BAR; 1R																	
2013	WIG; 2R	WIG; 1R	WIG; 2R	WIG; 2R	CRA; 2R	CRA; 1R	BAR; 1R	BAR; 1R	Did not participate				WIG; 1R	WIG; 2R	BAR; 1R	BAR; 2R																					
2014 (Note: Not a Tour card holder)	DNP	CRA; 1R	CRA; 2R	DNP	WIG; 3R	WIG; 1R	WIG; 1R	CRA; 3R	CRA; 3R	COV; 2R	COV; 1R	CRA; 3R	CRA; 1R	DUB; 2R	DUB; 1R	CRA; 3R	CRA; 1R	COV; 1R	COV; 4R																		
2015	Did not participate							COV; 2R	CRA; 1R	CRA; 2R	BAR; 1R	BAR; 3R	WIG; 1R	WIG; 1R	BAR; 2R	BAR; 3R	DUB; 2R	DNP																			
2016	BAR; 1R	BAR; 4R	BAR; 1R	BAR; 2R	BAR; 1R	BAR; 1R	BAR; 4R	COV; 2R	COV; 1R	BAR; 3R	BAR; 1R	BAR; 1R	BAR; 1R	BAR; 1R	BAR; 2R	BAR; 2R	DUB; 1R	DUB; 2R	BAR; 1R	BAR; 3R																	
2017	BAR; 1R	BAR; 2R	BAR; 2R	BAR; 2R	MIL; 4R	MIL; 1R	BAR; 1R	BAR; 1R	WIG; 3R	WIG; 2R	MIL; 2R	MIL; 1R	WIG; 3R	WIG; 1R	BAR; 2R	BAR; 1R	BAR; 1R	BAR; 1R	DUB; 1R	DUB; 1R	BAR; 2R	BAR; 3R															
2019	WIG; 2R	WIG; 2R	WIG; 1R	WIG; 1R	BAR; 1R	BAR; 2R	WIG; 1R	WIG; 1R	BAR; 1R	BAR; 2R	BAR; 1R	BAR; 2R	BAR; 2R	BAR; 1R	BAR; 1R	BAR; 1R	WIG; 3R	WIG; 3R	BAR; 2R	BAR; 3R	HIL; 1R	HIL; 2R	BAR; 1R	BAR; 2R	BAR; 2R	BAR; 1R	DUB; 1R	DUB; 2R	BAR; 2R	BAR; 1R							
2020	BAR; 2R	BAR; 2R	WIG; 3R	WIG; 1R	WIG; 1R	WIG; 1R	DNP		MIL; 2R	MIL; 2R	MIL; 1R	MIL; 1R	MIL; 2R	NIE; 1R	NIE; 1R	NIE; 1R	NIE; 1R	NIE; QF	COV; 1R	COV; 1R	COV; 2R	COV; 1R	COV; 1R														

==== PDC Challenge Tour ====
Season	1	2	3	4	5	6	7	8	9	10	11	12	13	14	15	16	17	18	19	20	21	22	23	24	Prize money	Ranking
2014	WIG; L64	WIG; L32	DNP	REA; L128	WIG; L128	WIG; F	COV; L16	COV; SF	WIG; L16	WIG; L64	COV; L128	COV; L64	COV; L32	COV; L32	WIG; L16	WIG; W									£4,550	6th
2015	WIG; L16	WIG; L16	WIG; L16	WIG; L128	WIG; L32	WIG; W	WIG; L32	WIG; L128	WIG; L128	WIG; L32	WIG; L32	WIG; L16	COV; L128	COV; L32	COV; L128	COV; L64									£3,350	9th
2018	WIG; L128	WIG; L256	WIG; L256	DNP		MIL; L64	DNP	MIL; L64	DNP	WIG; L256	DNP	WIG; L16	WIG; L32	WIG; L32	WIG; QF	WIG; L32	PET; L64	PET; L16	PET; L64	PET; L64					£1,250	44th
2021 UK	MIL; L128	MIL; L256	MIL; L256	MIL; L256	MIL; L256	MIL; L64	DNP	MIL; L16	MIL; L256	MIL; L64	MIL; L128	MIL; L32	Did not participate												£400	84th
2022	DNP	MIL; L256	DNP	MIL; L128	Did not participate																				£0	NR

Performance Table Legend
W	Won the tournament	F	Finalist	SF	Semifinalist	QF	Quarterfinalist	#R; RR; Prel.	Lost in # round Round-robin; Preliminary round	DQ	Disqualified
DNQ	Did not qualify	DNP	Did not participate	WD	Withdrew	NH	Tournament not held	#R; RR; Prel.	Lost in # round Round-robin; Preliminary round	NYF	Not yet founded
