= Les Wallace =

Scottish darts player (born 1962)

Personal information
- Nickname: "McDanger"
- Born: 22 February 1962 (age 64) Forres, Scotland
- Home town: Millbrook, Southampton, England

Sport
- Sport: Darts
- Playing since: 1982
- Darts: 24g B&W Signature
- Laterality: Left-handed
- Walk-on music: "Rock and Roll" by Led Zeppelin preceded opening to "Freed from Desire" by Gala

Organisation (see split in darts)
- BDO: 1993–2003
- PDC: 2012

WDF major events – best performances
- World Championship: Winner (1) 1997
- World Masters: Winner (1) 1998
- Finder Masters: Quarter-final: 2000

WSDT major events – best performances
- World Championship: Last 24: 2022
- World Masters: Quarter-final: 2022

Other tournament wins
- Tournament: Years
- Cosham Xmas Open Hampshire Open Mill Rythe Darts Festival: 2012; 2004; 1993

Les Wallace (born 22 February 1962) is a Scottish former professional darts player. He adopted the nickname "McDanger" and was known for wearing a kilt for his matches. He won the 1997 BDO World Darts Championship.

== Career ==
In 1993, Wallace reached the final of the Winmau World Masters, losing to Steve Beaton. He won the title five years later, beating Alan Warriner in the final.

Wallace made his first appearance at the World Championship in 1995, losing a first-round match to Raymond van Barneveld. In the 1996 Championship, he lost to the defending world champion, Richie Burnett, in the semi-finals.

In 1997, Wallace defeated Bob Taylor in the first round and then beat van Barneveld 3–2 in the second round. He went on to win the World Championship with further wins against Paul Williams, Mervyn King, and a 6–3 victory over Marshall James in the final. Wallace became the first left-handed player to win a either a PDC or BDO World Championship.

Wallace was unable to defend his title at the 1998 championship. He managed only two more match victories at Lakeside, where the BDO Worlds were held. His title defence of his title ended with a second-round loss to Steve Beaton, another former World Champion. Wallace was beaten again by van Barneveld in 1999 in the second round, having had darts at double to win. In 2000, Wallace lost to Ritchie Davies in the first round; he did not qualify to play at the World Championship afterwards.

== End of career ==
Wallace's private life was a major contributor to his withdrawal from the full-time darts circuit. At one of his court cases, his solicitor Charles Thomas told the court that Wallace's life dramatically changed in 1999 when he and his partner, Carol, lost their premature twins who were four days old. This led to the collapse of the relationship and to Wallace drinking more heavily.

Wallace effectively withdrew from the full-time circuit in 1999, although he still participated in some BDO tournaments. He participated in the World Masters in 2000 and 2003, losing his first match on both occasions. His only televised appearance after this came in an exhibition match before the World Darts Trophy final in 2006, where he played in a Legends match against Bobby George.

Wallace made some attempts to revive his career, and won the Hampshire Open in 2004. In the 2010 Hampshire Open, he won three early round matches but was eliminated at the last 64 stage to K. Gamblin. He received an invitation to compete in the preliminary round of the 2010 competition but was beaten in his first match.

Wallace also he attended the PDC Qualifying School event in January 2012. He gained a two-year PDC tour card after finishing 23rd in the Q School Order of Merit.

== Personal life ==
Wallace has had several legal troubles throughout his career. After a 1996 court appearance, he was fined £210 and banned for 12 months for driving with excess alcohol, having no insurance, and failing to stop. Later, in 2001, he received a four-month jail sentence and was banned for driving for three years after admitting to dangerous driving. He was given a two-week suspended prison sentence for failing to pay £778.73 in council tax in February 2001. Wallace owed the money to Southampton City Council for failing to pay for the period 1 April 1997 (the year in which he won £38,000 for winning the World Championship) to 31 May 2000.

== World Championship results ==
=== BDO ===
- 1995: First round (lost to Raymond van Barneveld 2–3) (sets)
- 1996: Semi-finals (lost to Richie Burnett 2–5)
- 1997: Winner (beat Marshall James 6–3)
- 1998: Second round (lost to Steve Beaton 2–3)
- 1999: Second round (lost to Raymond van Barneveld 2–3)
- 2000: First round (lost to Ritchie Davies 0–3)

=== WSDT ===
- 2022: First round (lost to John Walton 2–3)
- 2023: First round (lost to Darryl Fitton 2–3)
