= List of PDC World Cup of Darts teams =

PDC World Cup participants (as of 2024) 18 nations which have participated in every edition 22 current nations which have not participated in all editions 8 former participant nations

In the fifteen editions of the World Cup of Darts tournament organised by the Professional Darts Corporation, 51 nations have competed. This is a list of all teams that have participated, organised by country.

== Overview ==
As of 2026, of the 51 nations to have competed, 18 of them have played in all sixteen tournaments to date.

Team	Appearances				
Team	Total	First	Last	Best result	Finals
Argentina	1	2025	2025	Last 16	0
Australia	16	2010	2026	Winners (1)	2
Austria	16	2010	2026	Runners-up	2
Bahrain	3	2023	2025	Last 40	0
Belgium	16	2010	2026	Runners-up	1
Brazil	6	2017	2022	Last 16	0
Canada	16	2010	2026	Quarter-finalists	0
China	11	2014	2026	Last 16	0
Chinese Taipei	2	2024	2025	Last 16	0
Croatia	6	2012	2026	Quarter-finalists	0
Czech Republic	12	2015	2026	Quarter-finalists	0
Denmark	16	2010	2026	Last 16	0
England	16	2010	2026	Winners (6)	8
Finland	16	2010	2026	Semi-finalists	0
France	5	2014	2026	Quarter-finalists	0
Germany	16	2010	2026	Semi-finalists	0
Gibraltar	16	2010	2026	Last 16	0
Greece	6	2016	2021	Last 16	0
Guyana	2	2023	2024	Last 40	0
Hong Kong	13	2014	2026	Quarter-finalists	0
Hungary	15	2012	2026	Last 16	0
Iceland	2	2023	2024	Last 40	0
India	5	2014	2026	Last 32	0
Ireland	16	2010	2026	Runners-up	1
Italy	14	2013	2026	Quarter-finalists	0
Japan	16	2010	2026	Semi-finalists	0
Latvia	6	2020	2026	Last 16	0
Lithuania	8	2019	2026	Last 16	0
Malaysia	4	2012	2025	Last 16	0
Mongolia	1	2026	2026	Last 40	0
Netherlands	16	2010	2026	Winners (4)	6
New Zealand	15	2010	2026	Quarter-finalists	0
Northern Ireland	16	2010	2026	Winners (1)	1
Norway	6	2014	2026	Last 16	0
Philippines	11	2012	2026	Last 16	0
Poland	15	2010	2026	Last 16	0
Portugal	7	2020	2026	Last 16	0
Russia	9	2010	2021	Quarter-finalists	0
Scotland	16	2010	2026	Winners (2)	4
Singapore	11	2014	2026	Quarter-finalists	0
Slovakia	1	2010	2010	Last 32	0
Slovenia	2	2010	2026	Last 32	0
South Africa	15	2012	2026	Quarter-finalists	0
Spain	16	2010	2026	Semi-finalists	0
Sweden	16	2010	2026	Quarter-finalists	0
Switzerland	6	2017	2026	Last 16	0
Thailand	7	2014	2026	Last 32	0
Trinidad and Tobago	1	2026	2026	Last 40	0
Uganda	0	—N/a (Note: Uganda qualified for the 2026 tournament, but were withdrawn prior to the tournament beginning due to visa difficulties.)			0
Ukraine	1	2023	2023	Last 40	0
United States	16	2010	2026	Quarter-finalists	0
Wales	16	2010	2026	Winners (2)	6

== Legend ==
Key
W	RU	SF	QF	#R	G#

(W) winners; (RU) runners-up; (SF) semifinalists; (QF) quarterfinalist; (#R) rounds 2, 1; (G#) round-robin stage

== Argentina ==
Argentina
- Overall record: 2–1
- Best performance: Last 16: 2025

Jerseys

Argentina made their World Cup of Darts debut in 2025 after winning the Latin American and Caribbean Qualifier.

Year	Team		Seed	Result	Defeated by	Ref.
2025	Jesús Salate	Víctor Guillín	—N/a	2R	Australia	

== Australia ==
Australia
- Overall record: 34–16
- Best performance: Winners: 2022
- Members: Damon Heta; Adam Leek

Jerseys

An ever present at the World Cup, Australia reached the final in 2012 against England. The match went all the way, being decided by a sudden death leg where all four players had darts at double before Adrian Lewis secured victory for England. But in 2022, their 10-year agony came to an end when Damon Heta and Simon Whitlock beat Wales in the final to become the 5th different nation to win the trophy.

Year	Team		Seed	Result	Defeated by	Ref.
2010	Simon Whitlock	Paul Nicholson	3	SF	Netherlands (group); Wales (semifinal)	
2012	Simon Whitlock	Paul Nicholson	2	RU	England	
2013	Simon Whitlock	Paul Nicholson	3	2R	Belgium	
2014	Simon Whitlock	Paul Nicholson	4	SF	England	
2015	Simon Whitlock	Paul Nicholson	4	QF	Belgium	
2016	Simon Whitlock	Kyle Anderson	6	QF	Netherlands	
2017	Simon Whitlock	Kyle Anderson	5	2R	Russia	
2018	Simon Whitlock	Kyle Anderson	4	SF	Scotland	
2019	Simon Whitlock	Kyle Anderson	5	2R	Canada	
2020 (Note: Kyle Anderson was ranked above Damon Heta at the time of the 2020 tournament, but remained in Australia due to the COVID-19 pandemic.)	Simon Whitlock	Damon Heta	—N/a	QF	Wales	
2021	Simon Whitlock	Damon Heta	7	QF	Wales	
2022	Simon Whitlock	Damon Heta	5	W	—N/a	
2023	Simon Whitlock	Damon Heta	7	QF	Belgium	
2024	Simon Whitlock	Damon Heta	8	2R	Italy	
2025	Simon Whitlock	Damon Heta	—N/a	QF	Germany	
2026	Adam Leek	Damon Heta	11	G40	Canada; United States	

== Austria ==
Austria
- Overall record: 25–18
- Best performance: Runners-up: 2021, 2024
- Members: Mensur Suljović; Rusty-Jake Rodriguez

Jerseys

Mensur Suljović has led the Austrian team at every World Cup since its inception. The team's best performance was reaching the final, which "The Gentle" has achieved twice alongside Rowby-John Rodriguez, in 2021 and 2024. Both fairytale runs saw them lose in the final to Scotland and England. Austria also temporarily hosted the event in 2020, during the COVID-19 Pandemic.

Year	Team		Seed	Result	Defeated by	Ref.
2010	Mensur Suljović	Maik Langendorf	14	G8	Netherlands; Canada; Australia	
2012	Mensur Suljović	Dietmar Burger	12	2R	Netherlands	
2013	Mensur Suljović	Maik Langendorf	—N/a	G24	England; Japan	
2014	Mensur Suljović	Rowby-John Rodriguez	10	2R	Belgium	
2015	Mensur Suljović	Rowby-John Rodriguez	8	2R	Germany	
2016	Mensur Suljović	Rowby-John Rodriguez	8	QF	England	
2017	Mensur Suljović	Rowby-John Rodriguez	7	QF	England	
2018	Mensur Suljović	Zoran Lerchbacher	8	1R	Japan	
2019	Mensur Suljović	Zoran Lerchbacher	8	QF	Ireland	
2020	Mensur Suljović	Rowby-John Rodriguez	8	QF	England	
2021	Mensur Suljović	Rowby-John Rodriguez	—N/a	RU	Scotland	
2022	Mensur Suljović	Rowby-John Rodriguez	—N/a	2R	Wales	
2023	Mensur Suljović	Rowby-John Rodriguez	10	G40	Denmark	
2024	Mensur Suljović	Rowby-John Rodriguez	10	RU	England	
2025	Mensur Suljović	Rusty-Jake Rodriguez	12	G40	Australia	
2026	Mensur Suljović	Rusty-Jake Rodriguez	13	G40	France	

== Bahrain ==
Bahrain
- Overall record: 0–6
- Best performance: Group stage: 2023, 2024, 2025

Jerseys

Bahrain became one of three new nations participating in the World Cup, when they made their debut in 2023.

Year	Team		Seed	Result	Defeated by	Ref.
2023	Bassim Mahmood	Abdulnaser Yusuf	—N/a	G40	Latvia; New Zealand	
2024	Bassim Mahmood	Duda Durra	—N/a	G40	Czech Republic; Iceland	
2025	Sadiq Mohamed	Hassan Bucheeri	—N/a	G40	United States; Hong Kong	

== Belgium ==
Belgium
- Overall record: 37–17
- Best performance: Runners-up: 2013
- Members: Mike De Decker; Dimitri Van den Bergh

Jerseys

Amongst teams that have never won the World Cup, Belgium has the best record, reaching the final 4 eight times, including a loss to England in the 2013 final. The seven semi-finals statistic is third only to the four-time champions of England and the Netherlands. The Belgian team is also unique in being the only team to be composed of brothers, being represented by Kim and Ronny Huybrechts from 2013 to 2017. Kim represented Belgium from 2012 until 2024, but got replaced by Mike De Decker after he won the 2024 World Grand Prix and took his place in the top 32 on the Order of Merit, surpassing Kim.

Year	Team		Seed	Result	Defeated by	Ref.
2010	Patrick Bulen	Rocco Maes	21	2R	Canada	
2012	Kim Huybrechts	Kurt van de Rijck	7	QF	Australia	
2013	Kim Huybrechts	Ronny Huybrechts	—N/a	RU	Northern Ireland (group); England (final)	
2014	Kim Huybrechts	Ronny Huybrechts	7	QF	Netherlands	
2015	Kim Huybrechts	Ronny Huybrechts	5	SF	England	
2016	Kim Huybrechts	Ronny Huybrechts	7	SF	Netherlands	
2017	Kim Huybrechts	Ronny Huybrechts	8	SF	Wales	
2018	Kim Huybrechts	Dimitri Van den Bergh	7	SF	Netherlands	
2019	Kim Huybrechts	Dimitri Van den Bergh	7	QF	Scotland	
2020	Kim Huybrechts	Dimitri Van den Bergh	5	SF	England	
2021	Kim Huybrechts	Dimitri Van den Bergh	4	2R	Austria	
2022	Kim Huybrechts	Dimitri Van den Bergh	4	QF	Australia	
2023	Kim Huybrechts	Dimitri Van den Bergh	5	SF	Wales	
2024	Kim Huybrechts	Dimitri Van den Bergh	5	SF	Austria	
2025	Mike De Decker	Dimitri Van den Bergh	6	G40	Philippines	
2026	Mike De Decker	Dimitri Van den Bergh	6	2R	Hong Kong (group); Northern Ireland	

== Brazil ==
Brazil
- Overall record: 2–6
- Best performance: Last 16: 2017, 2018

Jerseys

Brazil was one of two teams to debut in the 2017 World Cup and did so with a first round victory over other debutant Switzerland. Diogo Portela has been an ever-present for the team.

Year	Team		Seed	Result	Defeated by	Ref.
2017	Diogo Portela	Alexandre Sattin	—N/a	2R	Germany	
2018	Diogo Portela	Bruno Rangel	—N/a	2R	Scotland	
2019	Diogo Portela	Artur Valle	—N/a	1R	Sweden	
2020	Diogo Portela	Bruno Rangel	—N/a	1R	Netherlands	
2021	Diogo Portela	Artur Valle	—N/a	1R	England	
2022	Diogo Portela	Artur Valle	—N/a	1R	Netherlands	

== Canada ==
Canada
- Overall record: 16–17
- Best performance: Last 8: 2010, 2016, 2019, 2020
- Members: Jim Long; David Cameron

Jerseys

Triple World champion John Part was an ever-present in this tournament until 2018, with the team reaching the quarter-finals on four separate occasions.

Year	Team		Seed	Result	Defeated by	Ref.
2010	John Part	Ken MacNeil	7	G8	Netherlands; Australia	
2012	John Part	Ken MacNeil	9	2R	England	
2013	John Part	Jeff Smith	—N/a	2R	Scotland (group); Wales (second round)	
2014	John Part	Shaun Narain	11	1R	Japan	
2015	John Part	Ken MacNeil	11	1R	New Zealand	
2016	John Part	Ken MacNeil	—N/a	QF	N. Ireland	
2017	John Part	John Norman Jnr	—N/a	2R	Austria	
2018	John Part	Dawson Murschell	—N/a	2R	Japan	
2019	Jim Long	Dawson Murschell	—N/a	QF	Netherlands	
2020	Jeff Smith	Matt Campbell	—N/a	QF	Belgium	
2021	Jeff Smith	Matt Campbell	—N/a	1R	Germany	
2022	Jeff Smith	Matt Campbell	—N/a	1R	Ireland	
2023	Jeff Smith	Matt Campbell	12	2R	Sweden	
2024	David Cameron	Matt Campbell	—N/a	G40	Croatia	
2025	Jim Long	Matt Campbell	10	G40	Malaysia; Denmark	
2026	Jim Long	David Cameron	—N/a	G40	United States	

== China ==
China
- Overall record: 2–12
- Best performance: Last 16: 2016
- Members: Xiaochen Zong; Qingyu Zhan

Jerseys

China was one of the seven teams to debut in the 2014 World Cup, when the tournament field was increased from 24 to 32 teams. They notably became the second team to have a female representative at the World Cup when Momo Zhou teamed with Xiaochen Zong in 2018. Owing to COVID-19 restrictions, they had to withdraw from the 2020 tournament, and miss the 2022 tournament altogether.

Year	Team		Seed	Result	Defeated by	Ref.
2014	Yin Deng	Jun Cai	—N/a	1R	Austria	
2015	Jun Chen	Xuejie Huang	—N/a	1R	Japan	
2016	Yuanjun Liu	Wenge Xie	—N/a	2R	England	
2017	Yuanjun Liu	Weihong Li	—N/a	1R	Austria	
2018	Zong Xiao Chen	Momo Zhou	—N/a	1R	Switzerland	
2019	Zong Xiao Chen	Yuanjun Liu	—N/a	1R	United States	
2020	Zizhao Zheng	Di Zhuang	—N/a	Withdrew		
2021	Wenqing Liu	Jianfeng Lu	—N/a	1R	Scotland	
2022	Did not play					
2023	Zong Xiao Chen	Lihao Wen	—N/a	G40	Belgium; Finland	
2024	Zong Xiao Chen	Chengan Liu	—N/a	G40	Austria	
2025	Zong Xiao Chen	Lihao Wen	—N/a	G40	Gibraltar	
2026	Zong Xiao Chen	Qingyu Zhan	—N/a	G40	Austria; France	

== Chinese Taipei ==
Chinese Taipei
- Overall record: 2–1
- Best performance: Last 16: 2024

Jerseys

Chinese Taipei made their debut in 2024. Highlights in their debut included a win over 2019 runners-up, Ireland.

Year	Team		Seed	Result	Defeated by	Ref.
2024	Teng-Lieh Pupo	An-Sheng Lu	—N/a	2R	Austria	
2025	Teng-Lieh Pupo	An-Sheng Lu	—N/a	G40	Czech Republic	

== Croatia ==
Croatia
- Overall record: 8–7
- Best performance: Last 8: 2013, 2024
- Members: Boris Krčmar; Pero Ljubić

Jerseys

Croatia didn't play in the inaugural World Cup, but were one of the 5 new teams to debut in the 2012 edition. Despite beating New Zealand and Northern Ireland to reach the quarter-finals in 2013, they hadn't been invited back to another World Cup, until a surprise recall in 2021, but they then had to withdraw owing to an illness to Boris Krčmar.

Year	Team		Seed	Result	Defeated by	Ref.
2012	Tonči Restović	Boris Krčmar	18	2R	Wales	
2013	Tonči Restović	Robert Marijanović	—N/a	QF	Australia (group); Belgium (QF)	
2014	Did not play					
2015	Did not play					
2016	Did not play					
2017	Did not play					
2018	Did not play					
2019	Did not play					
2020	Did not play					
2021	Boris Krčmar	Pero Ljubić	—N/a	Withdrew		
2022	Did not play					
2023	Boris Krčmar	Romeo Grbavac	—N/a	2R	Australia	
2024	Boris Krčmar	Romeo Grbavac	13	QF	Austria	
2025	Boris Krčmar	Pero Ljubić	15	G40	Japan	
2026	Boris Krčmar	Pero Ljubić	15	G40	Japan; Spain	

== Czech Republic ==
Czech Republic
- Overall record: 5–11
- Best performance: Last 8: 2025
- Members: Karel Sedláček; Adam Gawlas

Jerseys

After being forced to withdraw from the inaugural World Cup in 2010 due to inclement weather, the Czech Republic had to wait until 2015 to make its debut. They have been active in the tournament ever since, but had to wait until 2024 to reach the second round. Czechia reached the quarter-finals for the first time in 2025.

Their average of 103.47 in their 2021 loss to Poland was the highest losing average in a first-round match at the World Cup of Darts.

Year	Team		Seed	Result	Defeated by	Ref.
2010	Martin Kapucian	Pavel Drtíl	23	Withdrew		
2012	Did not play					
2013	Did not play					
2014	Did not play					
2015	Michal Kočík	Pavel Jirkal	—N/a	1R	Austria	
2016	Michal Kočík	Pavel Drtíl	—N/a	1R	China	
2017	Karel Sedláček	František Humpula	—N/a	1R	Netherlands	
2018	Karel Sedláček	Roman Benecký	—N/a	1R	England	
2019	Karel Sedláček	Pavel Jirkal	—N/a	1R	Poland	
2020	Karel Sedláček	Adam Gawlas	—N/a	1R	Belgium	
2021	Karel Sedláček	Adam Gawlas	—N/a	1R	Poland	
2022	Karel Sedláček	Adam Gawlas	—N/a	1R	England	
2023	Karel Sedláček	Adam Gawlas	13	G40	Philippines	
2024	Karel Sedláček	Adam Gawlas	12	2R	Sweden	
2025	Karel Sedláček	Petr Křivka	14	QF	Netherlands	
2026	Karel Sedláček	Adam Gawlas	12	2R	Germany	

== Denmark ==
Denmark
- Overall record: 6–17
- Best performance: Last 16: 2012, 2016, 2022
- Members: Andreas Toft Jørgensen; Jonas Graversen

Jerseys

An ever-present in the competition, the Danes have never gone beyond the last 16 stage.

Year	Team		Seed	Result	Defeated by	Ref.
2010	Per Laursen	Vladimir Andersen	19	1R	Austria	
2012	Per Laursen	Jann Hoffmann	17	2R	N. Ireland	
2013	Per Laursen	Jann Hoffmann	—N/a	G24	Ireland	
2014	Per Laursen	Dennis Lindskjold	—N/a	1R	Australia	
2015	Per Laursen	Per Skau	—N/a	1R	England	
2016	Per Laursen	Daniel Jensen	—N/a	2R	Australia	
2017	Per Laursen	Alex Jensen	—N/a	1R	Australia	
2018	Per Laursen	Henrik Primdal	—N/a	1R	Brazil	
2019	Per Laursen	Niels Heinsøe	—N/a	1R	Scotland	
2020	Per Laursen	Niels Heinsøe	—N/a	1R	New Zealand	
2021	Andreas Toft Jørgensen	Niels Heinsøe	—N/a	1R	Netherlands	
2022	Andreas Toft Jørgensen	Vladimir Andersen	—N/a	2R	Germany	
2023	Benjamin Drue Reus	Vladimir Andersen	—N/a	2R	Wales	
2024	Benjamin Drue Reus	Claus Bendix Nielsen	—N/a	G40	France; Latvia	
2025	Benjamin Drue Reus	Andreas Hyllgaardhus	—N/a	G40	Malaysia	
2026	Andreas Toft Jørgensen	Jonas Graversen	—N/a	G40	Czech Republic	

== England ==
England
- Overall record: 45–9
- Best performance: Winner (6): 2012, 2013, 2015, 2016, 2024, 2026
- Members: Luke Littler; Luke Humphries

Jerseys

After the loss to Spain in the inaugural World Cup in 2010, England reached the final in the next 5 editions, winning 4 of them, thanks to the combination of Phil Taylor and Adrian Lewis. However, between 2017 and 2023 England was only able to reach the final a single time. They were able to win their 5th and 6th World Cups in 2024 and 2026, with Luke Humphries partnering Michael Smith and Luke Littler respectively.

Year	Team		Seed	Result	Defeated by	Ref.
2010	Phil Taylor	James Wade	1	2R	Spain	
2012	Phil Taylor	Adrian Lewis	1	W	—N/a	
2013	Phil Taylor	Adrian Lewis	1	W	—N/a	
2014	Phil Taylor	Adrian Lewis	1	RU	Netherlands	
2015	Phil Taylor	Adrian Lewis	1	W	—N/a	
2016	Phil Taylor	Adrian Lewis	1	W	—N/a	
2017	Dave Chisnall	Adrian Lewis	2	SF	Netherlands	
2018	Dave Chisnall	Rob Cross	2	QF	Belgium	
2019	Michael Smith	Rob Cross	1	2R	Ireland	
2020	Michael Smith	Rob Cross	1	RU	Wales	
2021	James Wade	Dave Chisnall	1	SF	Austria	
2022	James Wade	Michael Smith	1	SF	Australia	
2023	Rob Cross	Michael Smith	1	QF	Germany	
2024	Luke Humphries	Michael Smith	1	W	—N/a	
2025	Luke Humphries	Luke Littler	1	2R	Germany	
2026	Luke Humphries	Luke Littler	1	W	—N/a	

== Finland ==
Finland
- Overall record: 5–18
- Best performance: Semi-finals: 2013
- Members: Jani Haavisto; Jonas Masalin

Jerseys

Another ever-present team, Finland's record is unspectacular with the exception of a surprise semi-final run in 2013, including an upset victory over the Dutch team of Michael van Gerwen and Raymond van Barneveld.

Year	Team		Seed	Result	Defeated by	Ref.
2010	Marko Kantele	Jarkko Komula	12	1R	Belgium	
2012	Marko Kantele	Petri Korte	15	1R	Croatia	
2013	Jarkko Komula	Jani Haavisto	—N/a	SF	Belgium	
2014	Jarkko Komula	Jani Haavisto	12	1R	Poland	
2015	Marko Kantele	Kim Viljanen	—N/a	1R	South Africa	
2016	Marko Kantele	Kim Viljanen	—N/a	1R	Wales	
2017	Marko Kantele	Kim Viljanen	—N/a	1R	Wales	
2018	Marko Kantele	Kim Viljanen	—N/a	2R	Belgium	
2019	Marko Kantele	Kim Viljanen	—N/a	1R	Australia	
2020	Marko Kantele	Veijo Viinikka	—N/a	1R	Germany	
2021	Marko Kantele	Veijo Viinikka	—N/a	1R	Wales	
2022	Marko Kantele	Aki Paavilainen	—N/a	1R	Austria	
2023	Marko Kantele	Paavo Myller	—N/a	G40	Belgium	
2024	Marko Kantele	Teemu Harju	—N/a	G40	Germany; New Zealand	
2025	Marko Kantele	Teemu Harju	16	G40	New Zealand; Argentina	
2026	Jani Haavisto	Jonas Masalin	16	G40	Norway; Hungary	

== France ==
France
- Overall record: 8–5
- Best performance: Last 8: 2023
- Members: Thibault Tricole; Nicolas Thuillier

Jerseys

France were one of seven teams to debut in the 2014 World Cup when the tournament field was increased from 24 to 32 teams. They lost 5–4 to Wales in the first round, and would not make a return to the tournament until 2023. In 2023, they reached the quarter-finals before being whitewashed by Scotland.

Year	Team		Seed	Result	Defeated by	Ref.
2014	Jacques Labre	Lionel Maranhao	—N/a	1R	Wales	
2015	Did not play					
2016	Did not play					
2017	Did not play					
2018	Did not play					
2019	Did not play					
2020	Did not play					
2021	Did not play					
2022	Did not play					
2023	Jacques Labre	Thibault Tricole	—N/a	QF	Scotland	
2024	Jacques Labre	Thibault Tricole	14	2R	England	
2025	Jacques Labre	Thibault Tricole	—N/a	G40	Lithuania	
2026	Nicolas Thuillier	Thibault Tricole	—N/a	2R	Latvia	

== Germany ==
Germany
- Overall record: 24–14
- Best performance: Semi-finals: 2020, 2023, 2025
- Members: Martin Schindler; Ricardo Pietreczko

Jerseys

Despite having home advantage for most of the tournaments, the Germans' best runs came in 2020, 2023, and 2025 when they reached the semi-finals in Austria and Germany respectively, which included wins over their rivals, The Netherlands and former winners, England.

Year	Team		Seed	Result	Defeated by	Ref.
2010	Jyhan Artut	Andree Welge	10	2R	Netherlands	
2012	Jyhan Artut	Bernd Roith	8	2R	United States	
2013	Jyhan Artut	Andree Welge	7	QF	Finland	
2014	Jyhan Artut	Andree Welge	9	1R	South Africa	
2015	Jyhan Artut	Max Hopp	9	QF	England	
2016	Jyhan Artut	Max Hopp	—N/a	1R	Australia	
2017	Martin Schindler	Max Hopp	—N/a	QF	Netherlands	
2018	Martin Schindler	Max Hopp	—N/a	QF	Netherlands	
2019	Martin Schindler	Max Hopp	—N/a	2R	Belgium	
2020	Gabriel Clemens	Max Hopp	6	SF	Wales	
2021	Gabriel Clemens	Max Hopp	8	QF	England	
2022	Gabriel Clemens	Martin Schindler	7	QF	Wales	
2023	Gabriel Clemens	Martin Schindler	6	SF	Scotland	
2024	Gabriel Clemens	Martin Schindler	7	2R	Northern Ireland	
2025	Ricardo Pietreczko	Martin Schindler	7	SF	Northern Ireland	
2026	Ricardo Pietreczko	Martin Schindler	5	QF	Netherlands	

== Gibraltar ==
Gibraltar
- Overall record: 4–18
- Best performance: Last 16: 2015
- Members: Craig Galliano; Justin Hewitt

Jerseys

The smallest nation in the tournaments by both size and population, Gibraltar's only wins to date came in 2015, 2023, 2024 and 2025, respectively when they beat Italy, Guyana, Spain and China.

Year	Team		Seed	Result	Defeated by	Ref.
2010	Dyson Parody	Dylan Duo	17	1R	Russia	
2012	Dyson Parody	Dylan Duo	16	1R	Denmark	
2013	Dyson Parody	Dylan Duo	—N/a	G24	Netherlands; Poland	
2014	Dyson Parody	Dylan Duo	—N/a	1R	Sweden	
2015	Dyson Parody	Manuel Vilerio	13	2R	Australia	
2016	Dyson Parody	Manuel Vilerio	—N/a	1R	Norway	
2017	Dyson Parody	Dylan Duo	—N/a	1R	England	
2018	Dyson Parody	Justin Broton	—N/a	1R	Netherlands	
2019	Dyson Parody	Antony Lopez	—N/a	1R	Japan	
2020	Craig Galliano	Justin Hewitt	—N/a	1R	Lithuania	
2021	Sean Negrette	Justin Hewitt	—N/a	1R	Singapore	
2022	Craig Galliano	Justin Hewitt	—N/a	1R	N. Ireland	
2023	Craig Galliano	Justin Hewitt	—N/a	G40	Australia	
2024	Craig Galliano	Justin Hewitt	—N/a	G40	Sweden	
2025	Craig Galliano	Justin Hewitt	—N/a	G40	Ireland	
2026	Craig Galliano	Justin Hewitt	—N/a	G40	Ireland; Singapore	

== Greece ==
Greece
- Overall record: 2–6
- Best performance: Last 16: 2017, 2020

Jerseys

Greece were the only team to debut in the 2016 World Cup after John Michael secured a Tour Card at Q-School.

Year	Team		Seed	Result	Defeated by	Ref.
2016	John Michael	Ioannis Selachoglou	—N/a	1R	Canada	
2017	John Michael	Ioannis Selachoglou	—N/a	2R	Belgium	
2018	John Michael	Veniamin Symeonidis	—N/a	1R	Finland	
2019	John Michael	Veniamin Symeonidis	—N/a	1R	Ireland	
2020	John Michael	Veniamin Symeonidis	—N/a	2R	Germany	
2021	John Michael	Veniamin Symeonidis	—N/a	1R	Belgium	

== Guyana ==
Guyana
- Overall record: 0–4

Jerseys

Guyana is one of the newer participants in the World Cup, making their debut in 2023.

Year	Team		Seed	Result	Defeated by	Ref.
2023	Sudesh Fitzgerald	Norman Madhoo	—N/a	G40	Australia; Gibraltar	
2024	Sudesh Fitzgerald	Norman Madhoo	—N/a	G40	Austria; China	

== Hong Kong ==
Hong Kong
- Overall record: 5–13
- Best performance: Last 8: 2015, 2025
- Members: Man Lok Leung; Lok Yin Lee

Jerseys

Hong Kong were one of the seven teams to debut in the 2014 World Cup (the only of which to be seeded) when the tournament field was increased from 24 to 32 teams. They reached the quarter-finals on their second appearance before succumbing to Scotland. They reached the quarter-finals for the second time in 2025.

Year	Team		Seed	Result	Defeated by	Ref.
2014	Royden Lam	Scott MacKenzie	13	2R	Australia	
2015	Royden Lam	Scott MacKenzie	—N/a	QF	Scotland	
2016	Royden Lam	Scott MacKenzie	—N/a	1R	Ireland	
2017	Royden Lam	Kai Fan Leung	—N/a	1R	Russia	
2018	Royden Lam	Ho-Yin Shek	—N/a	1R	Australia	
2019	Royden Lam	Kai Fan Leung	—N/a	1R	Belgium	
2020	Royden Lam	Kai Fan Leung	—N/a	1R	Latvia	
2021	Man Lok Leung	Kai Fan Leung	—N/a	1R	N. Ireland	
2022	Lok-Yin Lee	Ching Ho Tung	—N/a	1R	Scotland	
2023	Lok-Yin Lee	Man Lok Leung	—N/a	G40	Germany; Japan	
2024	Lok-Yin Lee	Man Lok Leung	—N/a	G40	Australia	
2025	Lok-Yin Lee	Man Lok Leung	—N/a	QF	Wales	
2026	Lok-Yin Lee	Man Lok Leung	—N/a	G40	Slovenia	

== Hungary ==
Hungary
- Overall record: 4–16
- Best performance: Last 16: 2015, 2016
- Members: Patrik Kovács; Pál Székely

Jerseys

Hungary did not play in the first World Cup, but have been present for every edition since 2012, although they've never gone past the last 16.

Year	Team		Seed	Result	Defeated by	Ref.
2012	Nándor Bezzeg	Krisztián Kaufmann	24	1R	Canada	
2013	Nándor Bezzeg	Zsolt Mészáros	—N/a	G24	N. Ireland; Belgium	
2014	Nándor Bezzeg	Zsolt Mészáros	—N/a	1R	United States	
2015	Nándor Bezzeg	Gábor Takács	—N/a	2R	Scotland	
2016	Nándor Bezzeg	Patrik Kovács	—N/a	2R	Belgium	
2017	János Végső	Zoltán Mester	—N/a	1R	Canada	
2018	Nándor Bezzeg	Tamás Alexits	—N/a	1R	South Africa	
2019	János Végső	Pál Székely	—N/a	1R	Germany	
2020	János Végső	Patrik Kovács	—N/a	1R	Portugal	
2021	János Végső	Patrik Kovács	—N/a	1R	Lithuania	
2022	Gergely Lakatos	Nándor Prés	—N/a	1R	Latvia	
2023	Patrik Kovács	Levente Sárai	—N/a	G40	Canada	
2024	Gábor Jagicza	Nándor Major	—N/a	G40	Norway; Poland	
2025	György Jehirszki	Gergely Lakatos	—N/a	G40	Italy; Netherlands	
2026	Patrik Kovács	Pál Székely	—N/a	G40	Norway	

== Iceland ==
Iceland
- Overall record: 1–3
- Best performance: Group stage: 2023, 2024

Jerseys

Iceland made their debut in 2023 and won their first match in 2024.

Year	Team		Seed	Result	Defeated by	Ref.
2023	Vitor Charrua	Hallgrímur Egilsson	—N/a	G40	South Africa; Spain	
2024	Pétur Rúðrik Guðmundsson	Arngrímur Ólafsson	—N/a	G40	Czech Republic	

== India ==
India
- Overall record: 0–6
- Best performance: Last 32: 2014, 2015
- Members: Nitin Kumar; Ankit Goenka

Jerseys

India were one of the seven teams to debut in the 2014 World Cup when the tournament field was increased from 24 to 32 teams.

Year	Team		Seed	Result	Defeated by	Ref.
2014	Nitin Kumar	Amit Gilitwala	—N/a	1R	Belgium	
2015	Nitin Kumar	Ashfaque Sayed	—N/a	1R	Germany	
2016	Did not play					
2017	Did not play					
2018	Did not play					
2019	Did not play					
2020	Did not play					
2021	Did not play					
2022	Did not play					
2023	Prakash Jiwa	Amit Gilitwala	—N/a	G40	Canada; Hungary	
2024	Did not play					
2025	Nitin Kumar	Mohan Goel	—N/a	G40	Chinese Taipei; Czech Republic	
2026	Nitin Kumar	Ankit Goenka	—N/a	G40	Czech Republic; Denmark	

== Republic of Ireland ==
Ireland
- Overall record: 13–14
- Best performance: Runners-up: 2019
- Members: William O'Connor; Mickey Mansell

Jerseys

After a relatively unspectacular record in the competition, the Republic of Ireland reached the final in 2019 after impressive wins over England and the Netherlands, before Scotland claimed the title.

Year	Team		Seed	Result	Defeated by	Ref.
2010	William O'Connor	Mick McGowan	9	2R	Australia	
2012	William O'Connor	Mick McGowan	10	2R	Australia	
2013	William O'Connor	Connie Finnan	8	2R	Japan	
2014	William O'Connor	Connie Finnan	8	1R	Singapore	
2015	William O'Connor	Connie Finnan	10	2R	Hong Kong	
2016	William O'Connor	Mick McGowan	—N/a	2R	N. Ireland	
2017	William O'Connor	Mick McGowan	—N/a	2R	Wales	
2018	William O'Connor	Steve Lennon	—N/a	1R	Belgium	
2019	William O'Connor	Steve Lennon	—N/a	RU	Scotland	
2020	William O'Connor	Steve Lennon	7	1R	Australia	
2021	William O'Connor	Steve Lennon	—N/a	1R	Portugal	
2022	William O'Connor	Steve Lennon	—N/a	2R	Netherlands	
2023	William O'Connor	Keane Barry	9	G40	Croatia	
2024	William O'Connor	Keane Barry	9	G40	Chinese Taipei	
2025	William O'Connor	Keane Barry	8	QF	N. Ireland	
2026	William O'Connor	Mickey Mansell (Note: Mansell had previously represented Northern Ireland.)	8	QF	Scotland	

== Italy ==
Italy
- Overall record: 6–15
- Best performance: Last 8: 2024
- Members: Michele Turetta; Riccardo Castelli

Jerseys

Italy did not participate in the first two World Cups, but joined the roster in 2013 as a replacement for the withdrawn Philippines. As of the 2022 tournament, they have the longest record of matches without ever recording a win at the World Cup, losing all eleven of their matches. In 2023, they won their first ever match at the World Cup against Switzerland. In 2024, they reached the quarter-finals before being eliminated by Belgium 7–8.

Year	Team		Seed	Result	Defeated by	Ref.
2013	Daniele Petri	Matteo Dal Monte	—N/a	G24	Wales; Spain	
2014	Daniele Petri	Marco Brentegani	—N/a	1R	Netherlands	
2015	Daniele Petri	Marco Brentegani	—N/a	1R	Gibraltar	
2016	Daniele Petri	Michel Furlani	—N/a	1R	Austria	
2017	Daniele Petri	Gabriel Rollo	—N/a	1R	United States	
2018	Alessio Medaina	Michel Furlani	—N/a	1R	Canada	
2019	Stefano Tomassetti	Andrea Micheletti	—N/a	1R	Canada	
2020	Daniele Petri	Andrea Micheletti	—N/a	1R	Spain	
2021	Michele Turetta	Danilo Vigato	—N/a	1R	Australia	
2022	Giuseppe di Rocco	Gabriel Rollo	—N/a	1R	Portugal	
2023	Michele Turetta	Massimo Dante	—N/a	G40	Sweden	
2024	Michele Turetta	Massimo Dalla Rosa	—N/a	QF	Belgium	
2025	Michele Turetta	Massimo Dalla Rosa	—N/a	G40	Netherlands	
2026	Michele Turetta	Riccardo Castelli	—N/a	G40	Latvia	

== Japan ==
Japan
- Overall record: 12–17
- Best performance: Semi-finals: 2019
- Members: Motomu Sakai; Haruki Muramatsu

Jerseys

Another ever-present, Japan's run to the semi-finals in 2019 bettered their previous best of quarter-final runs in 2013 and 2018.

Year	Team		Seed	Result	Defeated by	Ref.
2010	Haruki Muramatsu	Taro Yachi	22	1R	Spain	
2012	Haruki Muramatsu	Morihiro Hashimoto	20	1R	Sweden	
2013	Haruki Muramatsu	Sho Katsumi	—N/a	QF	England	
2014	Haruki Muramatsu	Morihiro Hashimoto	—N/a	2R	N. Ireland	
2015	Haruki Muramatsu	Morihiro Hashimoto	16	2R	England	
2016	Haruki Muramatsu	Keita Ono	—N/a	1R	N. Ireland	
2017	Haruki Muramatsu	Yuki Yamada	—N/a	1R	Spain	
2018	Haruki Muramatsu	Seigo Asada	—N/a	QF	Scotland	
2019	Haruki Muramatsu	Seigo Asada	—N/a	SF	Scotland	
2020	Yuki Yamada	Seigo Asada	—N/a	1R	Scotland	
2021	Yoshihisa Baba	Jun Matsuda	—N/a	2R	Germany	
2022	Toru Suzuki	Tomoya Goto	—N/a	1R	Belgium	
2023	Jun Matsuda	Tomoya Goto	—N/a	G40	Germany	
2024	Ryusei Azemoto	Tomoya Goto	—N/a	G40	Australia; Hong Kong	
2025	Ryusei Azemoto	Tomoya Goto	—N/a	G40	Switzerland	
2026	Motomu Sakai	Haruki Muramatsu	—N/a	G40	Spain	

== Latvia ==
Latvia
- Overall record: 5–4
- Best performance: Last 16: 2020, 2022
- Members: Madars Razma; Valters Melderis

Jerseys

Latvia were set to debut at the 2017 World Cup led by tour card holder Madars Razma along with Nauris Gleglu, but withdrew late on and were replaced by Switzerland. Following China's withdrawal from the 2020 tournament due to flight issues, Latvia finally made their long-awaited debut with a last leg victory over Hong Kong.

Year	Team		Seed	Result	Defeated by	Ref.
2017	Madars Razma	Nauris Gleglu	Withdrew			
2018	Did not play					
2019	Did not play					
2020	Madars Razma	Janis Mustafejevs	—N/a	2R	Belgium	
2021	Did not play					
2022	Madars Razma	Nauris Gleglu	—N/a	2R	England	
2023	Madars Razma	Dmitrijs Žukovs	15	2R	Wales	
2024	Madars Razma	Valters Melderis	—N/a	G40	France	
2025	Madars Razma	Valters Melderis	—N/a	G40	Belgium; Philippines	
2026	Madars Razma	Valters Melderis	14	QF	Northern Ireland	

== Lithuania ==
Lithuania
- Overall record: 5–9
- Best performance: Last 16: 2020, 2021
- Members: Darius Labanauskas; Mindaugas Barauskas

Jerseys

Lithuania were the only team to debut in the 2019 World Cup, taking the place of Switzerland after former WDF number one Darius Labanauskas secured a Tour Card at Q-School.

Year	Team		Seed	Result	Defeated by	Ref.
2019	Darius Labanauskas	Mindaugas Barauskas	—N/a	1R	New Zealand	
2020	Darius Labanauskas	Mindaugas Barauskas	—N/a	2R	England	
2021	Darius Labanauskas	Mindaugas Barauskas	—N/a	2R	Wales	
2022	Darius Labanauskas	Mindaugas Barauskas	—N/a	1R	Australia	
2023	Darius Labanauskas	Mindaugas Barauskas	—N/a	G40	Poland	
2024	Darius Labanauskas	Mindaugas Barauskas	—N/a	G40	Chinese Taipei; Ireland	
2025	Darius Labanauskas	Mindaugas Barauskas	—N/a	G40	Sweden	
2026	Darius Labanauskas	Mindaugas Barauskas	—N/a	G40	Wales	

== Malaysia ==
Malaysia
- Overall record: 0–4
- Best performance: Last 16: 2025

Jerseys

After an absence of ten years, Malaysia returned in 2024.

Year	Team		Seed	Result	Defeated by	Ref.
2012	Lee Choon Peng	Amin Abdul-Ghani	23	1R	Ireland	
2013	Did not play					
2014	Kesava Roa	Thomat Darus	—N/a	1R	N. Ireland	
2015	Did not play					
2016	Did not play					
2017	Did not play					
2018	Did not play					
2019	Did not play					
2020	Did not play					
2021	Did not play					
2022	Did not play					
2023	Did not play					
2024	Mohd-Nasr Bin Jantan	Siik Hwang Wong	—N/a	G40	Canada; Croatia	
2025	Tengku Shah	Jenn Ming Tan	—N/a	2R	Czech Republic	

== Mongolia ==
Mongolia
- Overall record: 0–2
- Best performance: Last 40: 2026
- Members: Ganzorig Lkhagvasüren; Altantülkhüür Myagmarsüren

Jerseys

Mongolia are set to make their World Cup of Darts debut at the 2026 tournament, after securing their place through the PDC Asian Tour qualifier.

Year	Team		Seed	Result	Defeated by	Ref.
2026	Ganzorig Lkhagvasüren	Altantülkhüür Myagmarsüren	—N/a	G40	South Africa; Sweden	

== Netherlands ==
Netherlands
- Overall record: 42–10
- Best performance: Winners: 2010, 2014, 2017, 2018
- Members: Gian van Veen; Michael van Gerwen

Jerseys

The winners of the inaugural tournament, the Netherlands have won the event on three other occasions, and have only failed to reach the quarter-finals stage three times.

Year	Team		Seed	Result	Defeated by	Ref.
2010	Raymond van Barneveld	Co Stompé	2	W	—N/a	
2012	Raymond van Barneveld	Vincent van der Voort	3	SF	Australia	
2013	Raymond van Barneveld	Michael van Gerwen	2	2R	Finland	
2014	Raymond van Barneveld	Michael van Gerwen	2	W	—N/a	
2015	Raymond van Barneveld	Michael van Gerwen	3	SF	Scotland	
2016	Raymond van Barneveld	Michael van Gerwen	3	RU	England	
2017	Raymond van Barneveld	Michael van Gerwen	3	W	—N/a	
2018	Raymond van Barneveld	Michael van Gerwen	3	W	—N/a	
2019	Jermaine Wattimena	Michael van Gerwen	4	SF	Ireland	
2020	Danny Noppert	Michael van Gerwen	3	QF	Germany	
2021	Dirk van Duijvenbode	Michael van Gerwen	3	QF	Scotland	
2022	Dirk van Duijvenbode	Danny Noppert	3	SF	Wales	
2023	Dirk van Duijvenbode	Danny Noppert	3	2R	Belgium	
2024	Michael van Gerwen	Danny Noppert	3	2R	Belgium	
2025 (Note: As world number three, Michael van Gerwen was eligible to play in the World Cup, but declined to participate due to having a holiday booked. Gian van Veen replaced him on the team.)	Gian van Veen	Danny Noppert	5	SF	Wales	
2026	Gian van Veen	Michael van Gerwen	2	RU	England	

== New Zealand ==
New Zealand
- Overall record: 8–16
- Best performance: Last 8: 2019
- Members: Jonny Tata; Ben Robb

Jerseys

The New Zealand team's only run of note came when they reached the quarter-finals in 2019. Due to COVID-19 travel restrictions, they couldn't participate in the 2021 tournament, ending their ever-present record.

Year	Team		Seed	Result	Defeated by	Ref.
2010	Phillip Hazel	Warren Parry	13	2R	Wales	
2012	Warren French	Preston Ridd	21	1R	Austria	
2013	Phillip Hazel	Craig Caldwell	—N/a	G24	Croatia; Australia	
2014	Rob Szabo	Craig Caldwell	—N/a	1R	Spain	
2015	Rob Szabo	Warren Parry	—N/a	2R	N. Ireland	
2016	Cody Harris	Warren Parry	—N/a	1R	Scotland	
2017	Cody Harris	Rob Szabo	—N/a	1R	Belgium	
2018	Cody Harris	Warren Parry	—N/a	1R	Singapore	
2019	Cody Harris	Haupai Puha	—N/a	QF	Japan	
2020	Cody Harris	Haupai Puha	—N/a	2R	Canada	
2021	Ben Robb	Warren Parry	—N/a	Withdrew		
2022	Ben Robb	Warren Parry	—N/a	2R	N. Ireland	
2023	Ben Robb	Warren Parry	—N/a	G40	Latvia	
2024	Ben Robb	Haupai Puha	—N/a	G40	Germany	
2025	Mark Cleaver	Haupai Puha	—N/a	G40	Argentina	
2026	Jonny Tata	Ben Robb	—N/a	G40	Germany; Philippines	

== Northern Ireland ==
Northern Ireland
- Overall record: 21–14
- Best performance: Winners: 2025
- Members: Josh Rock; Daryl Gurney

Jerseys

A team who have always been a top 8 seed, the Northern Irish team became the 6th different nation to win the tournament in 2025, after the pairing of Daryl Gurney and Josh Rock beat Wales in a sudden death deciding leg.

Year	Team		Seed	Result	Defeated by	Ref.
2010	Brendan Dolan	John MaGowan	6	2R	Austria	
2012	Brendan Dolan	Mickey Mansell	6	QF	Netherlands	
2013	Brendan Dolan	Mickey Mansell	6	2R	Croatia	
2014	Brendan Dolan	Mickey Mansell	6	SF	Netherlands	
2015	Brendan Dolan	Mickey Mansell	6	QF	Netherlands	
2016	Brendan Dolan	Daryl Gurney	4	SF	England	
2017	Brendan Dolan	Daryl Gurney	6	1R	Germany	
2018	Brendan Dolan	Daryl Gurney	6	2R	Germany	
2019	Brendan Dolan	Daryl Gurney	6	1R	South Africa	
2020	Brendan Dolan	Daryl Gurney	4	1R	Canada	
2021	Brendan Dolan	Daryl Gurney	5	QF	Austria	
2022	Brendan Dolan	Daryl Gurney	6	QF	Netherlands	
2023	Brendan Dolan	Daryl Gurney	8	G40	France	
2024	Brendan Dolan	Josh Rock	6	QF	England	
2025	Daryl Gurney	Josh Rock	4	W	—N/a	
2026	Daryl Gurney	Josh Rock	3	SF	Netherlands	

== Norway ==
Norway
- Overall record: 4–5
- Best performance: Last 16: 2016
- Members: Cor Dekker; Kent Jøran Sivertsen

Jerseys

Norway was one of the seven teams to debut in the 2014 World Cup when the tournament field was increased from 24 to 32 teams.

Year	Team		Seed	Result	Defeated by	Ref.
2014	Robert Wagner	Vegar Elvevoll	—N/a	1R	Hong Kong	
2015	Robert Wagner	Vegar Elvevoll	—N/a	1R	Spain	
2016	Robert Wagner	Cor Dekker	—N/a	2R	Scotland	
2017	Did not play					
2018	Did not play					
2019	Did not play					
2020	Did not play					
2021	Did not play					
2022	Did not play					
2023	Did not play					
2024	Cor Dekker	Håkon Bjørge Helling	—N/a	G40	Poland	
2025	Cor Dekker	Kent Jøran Sivertsen	—N/a	G40	South Africa	
2026	Cor Dekker	Kent Jøran Sivertsen	—N/a	2R	Scotland	

== Philippines ==
Philippines
- Overall record: 5–10
- Best performance: Last 16: 2016, 2023, 2025
- Members: Alexis Toylo; Paolo Nebrida

Jerseys

Philippines did not compete in the first World Cup, but debuted as one of the five new teams in the 2012 World Cup, and after missing the 2017 and 2018 tournaments, they returned in 2019.

Year	Team		Seed	Result	Defeated by	Ref.
2012	Lourence Ilagan	Christian Perez	22	1R	United States	
2013	Lourence Ilagan	Christian Perez	—N/a	Withdrew		
2014	Did not play					
2015	Lourence Ilagan	Gilbert Ulang	—N/a	1R	Belgium	
2016	Alex Tagarao	Gilbert Ulang	—N/a	2R	Netherlands	
2017	Did not play					
2018	Did not play					
2019	Lourence Ilagan	Noel Malicdem	—N/a	1R	England	
2020	Lourence Ilagan	Noel Malicdem	—N/a	1R	England	
2021	Lourence Ilagan	Christian Perez	—N/a	1R	Austria	
2022	Lourence Ilagan	RJ Escaros	—N/a	1R	Wales	
2023	Lourence Ilagan	Christian Perez	—N/a	2R	Scotland	
2024	Alexis Toylo	Christian Perez	—N/a	G40	Belgium	
2025	Lourence Ilagan	Paolo Nebrida	—N/a	2R	Wales	
2026	Alexis Toylo	Paolo Nebrida	—N/a	G40	Germany	

== Poland ==
Poland
- Overall record: 12–15
- Best performance: Last 16: 2013, 2014, 2019–2022, 2024
- Members: Krzysztof Ratajski; Sebastian Białecki

Jerseys

Appearing in all but the 2012 tournament, Poland have never gone beyond the last 16 stage. In 2023, Poland set the world record highest Pairs average of 118.10 against Lithuania in the group stage.

Year	Team		Seed	Result	Defeated by	Ref.
2010	Krzysztof Ratajski	Krzysztof Kciuk	20	1R	New Zealand	
2012	Did not play					
2013	Krzysztof Ratajski	Krzysztof Kciuk	—N/a	2R	Germany	
2014	Krzysztof Chmielewski	Krzysztof Stróżyk	—N/a	2R	Wales	
2015	Tytus Kanik	Mariusz Paul	—N/a	1R	Ireland	
2016	Krzysztof Ratajski	Mariusz Paul	—N/a	1R	Belgium	
2017	Krzysztof Ratajski	Tytus Kanik	—N/a	1R	Ireland	
2018	Krzysztof Ratajski	Tytus Kanik	—N/a	1R	N. Ireland	
2019	Krzysztof Ratajski	Tytus Kanik	—N/a	2R	Netherlands	
2020	Krzysztof Ratajski	Krzysztof Kciuk	—N/a	2R	Australia	
2021	Krzysztof Ratajski	Krzysztof Kciuk	—N/a	2R	Scotland	
2022	Krzysztof Ratajski	Sebastian Białecki	—N/a	2R	Belgium	
2023	Krzysztof Ratajski	Krzysztof Kciuk	11	2R	Germany	
2024	Krzysztof Ratajski	Radek Szagański	11	2R	Scotland	
2025	Krzysztof Ratajski	Radek Szagański	9	G40	Norway	
2026	Krzysztof Ratajski	Sebastian Białecki	9	2R	Ireland	

== Portugal ==
Portugal
- Overall record: 4–8
- Best performance: Last 16: 2020, 2021, 2022
- Members: José de Sousa; Luis Camacho

Jerseys

Portugal were invited to play at their first World Cup of Darts in 2020, following the late withdrawal of Singapore.

Year	Team		Seed	Result	Defeated by	Ref.
2020	José de Sousa	José Marquês	—N/a	2R	Austria	
2021	José de Sousa	José Marquês	—N/a	2R	N. Ireland	
2022	José de Sousa	Vítor Jerónimo	—N/a	2R	Scotland	
2023	José de Sousa	Luis Almeixa	—N/a	G40	Poland; Lithuania	
2024	José de Sousa	David Gomes	—N/a	G40	Italy	
2025	José de Sousa	Bruno Nascimento	—N/a	G40	Germany; Singapore	
2026	José de Sousa	Luis Camacho	—N/a	G40	Poland; Switzerland	

== Russia ==
Russia
- Overall record: 3–9
- Best performance: Last 8: 2017

Jerseys

After including Anastasia Dobromyslova in the inaugural tournament, Russia would miss the next 2 tournaments, before reaching the quarter-finals in 2017, where they beat Australia on the way.

Year	Team		Seed	Result	Defeated by	Ref.
2010	Anastasia Dobromyslova	Roman Konchikov	16	2R	Scotland	
2012	Did not play					
2013	Did not play					
2014	Evgenii Zhukov	Evgenii Izotov	—N/a	1R	Scotland	
2015	Boris Koltsov	Aleksei Kadochnikov	—N/a	1R	Australia	
2016	Boris Koltsov	Aleksandr Oreshkin	—N/a	1R	Netherlands	
2017	Boris Koltsov	Aleksandr Oreshkin	—N/a	QF	Wales	
2018	Boris Koltsov	Aleksandr Oreshkin	—N/a	1R	Spain	
2019	Boris Koltsov	Aleksei Kadochnikov	—N/a	1R	Austria	
2020	Boris Koltsov	Aleksei Kadochnikov	—N/a	1R	Wales	
2021	Boris Koltsov	Evgenii Izotov	—N/a	1R	Japan	

== Scotland ==
Scotland
- Overall record: 32–12
- Best performance: Winners: 2019, 2021
- Members: Gary Anderson; Cameron Menzies

Jerseys

After succumbing to Spain (twice) and South Africa in the first three tournaments, Scotland reached the final in 2015 and 2018, before winning the title in 2019 and again in 2021.

Year	Team		Seed	Result	Defeated by	Ref.
2010	Gary Anderson	Robert Thornton	4	G8	Wales; Spain	
2012	Gary Anderson	Peter Wright	4	2R	South Africa	
2013	Gary Anderson	Robert Thornton	4	2R	Spain	
2014	Peter Wright	Robert Thornton	3	QF	N. Ireland	
2015	Peter Wright	Gary Anderson	2	RU	England	
2016	Robert Thornton	Gary Anderson	2	QF	Belgium	
2017	Peter Wright	Gary Anderson	1	1R	Singapore	
2018	Peter Wright	Gary Anderson	1	RU	Netherlands	
2019	Peter Wright	Gary Anderson	2	W	—N/a	
2020 (Note: Reigning champions Peter Wright and Gary Anderson would have returned as the number two seeds in 2020, but withdrew due to the COVID-19 pandemic.)	Robert Thornton	John Henderson	—N/a	2R	Wales	
2021 (Note: John Henderson replaced Gary Anderson, who did not enter for personal reasons.)	Peter Wright	John Henderson	6	W	—N/a	
2022 (Note: Reigning champion John Henderson was invited to defend his title, despite being the sixth-ranked Scottish player on the PDC Order of Merit.)	Peter Wright	John Henderson	8	QF	England	
2023	Peter Wright	Gary Anderson	4	RU	Wales	
2024	Peter Wright	Gary Anderson	4	SF	England	
2025	Peter Wright	Gary Anderson	3	2R	Netherlands	
2026	Cameron Menzies	Gary Anderson	4	SF	England	

== Singapore ==
Singapore
- Overall record: 8–13
- Best performance: Last 8: 2017
- Members: Paul Lim; Phuay Wei Tan

Jerseys

Singapore were one of the seven teams to debut in the 2014 World Cup when the tournament field was increased from 24 to 32 teams. Up until the 2025 tournament, the team have consistently been represented by Paul Lim and Harith Lim (no relation). Singapore notably knocked out the number one seeded Scotland in the first round to kick off a run to the quarter-finals in 2017.

Year	Team		Seed	Result	Defeated by	Ref.
2014	Paul Lim	Harith Lim	—N/a	2R	South Africa	
2015	Paul Lim	Harith Lim	—N/a	1R	Scotland	
2016	Paul Lim	Harith Lim	—N/a	2R	Austria	
2017	Paul Lim	Harith Lim	—N/a	QF	Belgium	
2018	Paul Lim	Harith Lim	—N/a	2R	England	
2019	Paul Lim	Harith Lim	—N/a	2R	Japan	
2020	Paul Lim	Harith Lim	—N/a	Withdrew		
2021	Paul Lim	Harith Lim	—N/a	2R	Netherlands	
2022	Paul Lim	Harith Lim	—N/a	1R	Denmark	
2023	Paul Lim	Harith Lim	—N/a	G40	Philippines; Czech Republic	
2024	Paul Lim	Harith Lim	—N/a	G40	Belgium; Philippines	
2025	Paul Lim	Phuay Wei Tan	—N/a	G40	Germany	
2026	Paul Lim	Phuay Wei Tan	—N/a	G40	Ireland	

== Slovakia ==
Slovakia
- Overall record: 0–1
- Best performance: Last 24: 2010

Jerseys

Slovakia have only been invited to play at the first World Cup of Darts in 2010, where they lost to Ireland 6–3 in the first round.

Year	Team		Seed	Result	Defeated by	Ref.
2010	Peter Martin	Oto Zmelik	24	1R	Ireland	

== Slovenia ==
Slovenia
- Overall record: 1–2
- Best performance: Last 24: 2010
- Members: Benjamin Pratnemer; Stefano Božiček

Jerseys

Slovenia were invited to play at the first World Cup of Darts in 2010, where they lost to Sweden 6–2 in the first round. After a long absence, they returned for the 2026 tournament in the wake of Benjamin Pratnemer earning a PDC Tour Card.

Year	Team		Seed	Result	Defeated by	Ref.
2010	Osmann Kijamet	Sebastijan Pečjak	18	1R	Sweden	
2012	Did not play					
2013	Did not play					
2014	Did not play					
2015	Did not play					
2016	Did not play					
2017	Did not play					
2018	Did not play					
2019	Did not play					
2020	Did not play					
2021	Did not play					
2022	Did not play					
2023	Did not play					
2024	Did not play					
2025	Did not play					
2026	Benjamin Pratnemer	Stefano Božiček	—N/a	G40	Belgium	

== South Africa ==
South Africa
- Overall record: 14–15
- Best performance: Last 8: 2012, 2014
- Members: Devon Petersen; Graham Filby

Jerseys

South Africa did not appear in the first World Cup, but debuted the second World Cup in 2012 with a quarter-final run, and have been present for every edition since. They reached the quarter-finals in both 2012 and 2014.

Year	Team		Seed	Result	Defeated by	Ref.
2012	Devon Petersen	Shawn Hogan	19	QF	Wales	
2013	Charl Pietersen	Shawn Hogan	—N/a	2R	England	
2014	Devon Petersen	Graham Filby	—N/a	QF	England	
2015	Devon Petersen	Graham Filby	14	2R	Netherlands	
2016	Devon Petersen	Graham Filby	—N/a	1R	Singapore	
2017	Devon Petersen	Deon Oliver	—N/a	2R	England	
2018	Devon Petersen	Liam O'Brien	—N/a	2R	Netherlands	
2019	Devon Petersen	Vernon Bouwers	—N/a	2R	New Zealand	
2020	Devon Petersen	Carl Gabriel	—N/a	1R	Poland	
2021	Devon Petersen	Carl Gabriel	—N/a	2R	England	
2022	Devon Petersen	Stefan Vermaak	—N/a	1R	Sweden	
2023	Devon Petersen	Vernon Bouwers	—N/a	2R	France	
2024	Cameron Carolissen	Johan Geldenhuys	—N/a	G40	Northern Ireland	
2025	Cameron Carolissen	Devon Petersen	—N/a	2R	Northern Ireland	
2026	Graham Filby	Devon Petersen	—N/a	G40	Sweden	

== Spain ==
Spain
- Overall record: 14–18
- Best performance: Semi-finals: 2010
- Members: Cristo Reyes; José Justicia

Jerseys

Spain debuted in the inaugural World Cup with a second round upset of the top seed England in 2010, and progressing through the group stage eventually being swept by Netherlands in the semi-finals. Since then, they only progressed further than the last 16 only once in 10 years.

Year	Team		Seed	Result	Defeated by	Ref.
2010	Toni Alcinas	Carlos Rodríguez	11	SF	Netherlands	
2012	Toni Alcinas	Carlos Rodríguez	14	1R	South Africa	
2013	Toni Alcinas	Carlos Rodríguez	—N/a	QF	Wales	
2014	Toni Alcinas	Carlos Rodríguez	15	2R	Netherlands	
2015	Toni Alcinas	Cristo Reyes	12	2R	Belgium	
2016	Toni Alcinas	Cristo Reyes	—N/a	1R	England	
2017	Toni Alcinas	Cristo Reyes	—N/a	2R	Singapore	
2018	Toni Alcinas	Cristo Reyes	—N/a	2R	Australia	
2019	Toni Alcinas	Cristo Reyes	—N/a	1R	Netherlands	
2020 (Note: Top-ranked Spaniard Cristo Reyes was replaced by third-ranked Spaniard Noguera for undisclosed reasons in the 2020 World Cup.)	Toni Alcinas	Jesús Noguera	—N/a	2R	Netherlands	
2021	José Justicia	Jesús Noguera	—N/a	1R	South Africa	
2022	José Justicia	Tony Martinez	—N/a	1R	Germany	
2023	José Justicia	Tony Martinez	14	G40	South Africa	
2024	José Justicia	Jesús Noguera	—N/a	G40	Gibraltar; Sweden	
2025	Daniel Zapata	Ricardo Fernández	—N/a	G40	Austria; Australia	
2026	Cristo Reyes	José Justicia	—N/a	2R	England	

== Sweden ==
Sweden
- Overall record: 13–16
- Best performance: Last 8: 2023, 2024
- Members: Jeffrey de Graaf; Oskar Lukasiak

Jerseys

The ever-present Swedes have never been beyond the last 16 stage, until 2023, when they reached quarter finals in the new format tournament, being able to reach the quarter finals in two consecutive editions.

Year	Team		Seed	Result	Defeated by	Ref.
2010	Magnus Caris	Pär Riihonen	15	2R	United States	
2012	Magnus Caris	Dennis Nilsson	13	2R	Belgium	
2013	Magnus Caris	Pär Riihonen	—N/a	G24	Canada; Scotland	
2014	Magnus Caris	Peter Sajwani	14	2R	Scotland	
2015	Magnus Caris	Daniel Larsson	—N/a	1R	Hungary	
2016	Magnus Caris	Daniel Larsson	—N/a	1R	Denmark	
2017	Magnus Caris	Daniel Larsson	—N/a	1R	South Africa	
2018	Dennis Nilsson	Daniel Larsson	—N/a	1R	Germany	
2019	Dennis Nilsson	Magnus Caris	—N/a	2R	Scotland	
2020	Dennis Nilsson	Daniel Larsson	—N/a	1R	Greece	
2021	Johan Engström	Daniel Larsson	—N/a	1R	United States	
2022	Johan Engström	Daniel Larsson	—N/a	2R	Australia	
2023	Dennis Nilsson	Oskar Lukasiak	—N/a	QF	Wales	
2024	Jeffrey de Graaf	Oskar Lukasiak	15	QF	Scotland	
2025	Jeffrey de Graaf	Oskar Lukasiak	11	2R	Hong Kong	
2026	Jeffrey de Graaf	Oskar Lukasiak	10	2R	Netherlands	

== Switzerland ==
Switzerland
- Overall record: 2–8
- Best performance: Last 16: 2018, 2025
- Members: Stefan Bellmont; Marcel Walpen

Jerseys

Switzerland were one of two teams to debut in the 2017 World Cup as a last minute addition due to the withdrawal of Latvia. After only playing two editions of the tournament, they were replaced by Lithuania in 2019, but they returned to the tournament in 2022.

Year	Team		Seed	Result	Defeated by	Ref.
2017	Patrick Rey	Philipp Ruckstuhl	—N/a	1R	Brazil	
2018	Alex Fehlmann	Andy Bless	—N/a	2R	Wales	
2019	Did not play					
2020	Did not play					
2021	Did not play					
2022	Stefan Bellmont	Thomas Junghans	—N/a	1R	New Zealand	
2023	Stefan Bellmont	Marcel Walpen	16	G40	Sweden; Italy	
2024	Stefan Bellmont	Bruno Stöckli	—N/a	G40	Northern Ireland; South Africa	
2025	Stefan Bellmont	Alex Fehlmann	—N/a	2R	Ireland	
2026	Stefan Bellmont	Marcel Walpen	—N/a	G40	Poland	

== Thailand ==
Thailand
- Overall record: 0–9
- Best performance: Last 32: 2014–2018
- Members: Sarayut Ouamuapa; Sorawis Rodman

Jerseys

Thailand were one of the seven teams to debut in the 2014 World Cup when the tournament field was increased from 24 to 32 teams. After failing to win a match in five tournament appearances, the 2018 World Cup would be their last until the tournament expanded to 40 teams in 2023.

Year	Team		Seed	Result	Defeated by	Ref.
2014	Thanawat Gaweenuntawong	Watanyu Charoonroj	—N/a	1R	England	
2015	Thanawat Gaweenuntawong	Attapol Eupakaree	—N/a	1R	N. Ireland	
2016	Thanawat Gaweenuntawong	Attapol Eupakaree	—N/a	1R	Hungary	
2017	Thanawat Gaweenuntawong	Attapol Eupakaree	—N/a	1R	Greece	
2018	Thanawat Gaweenuntawong	Attapol Eupakaree	—N/a	1R	Wales	
2019	Did not play					
2020	Did not play					
2021	Did not play					
2022	Did not play					
2023	Thanawat Gaweenuntawong	Attapol Eupakaree	—N/a	G40	Croatia; Ireland	
2024	Did not play					
2025	Did not play					
2026	Sarayut Ouamuapa	Sorawis Rodman	—N/a	G40	Lithuania; Wales	

== Trinidad and Tobago ==
Trinidad and Tobago
- Overall record: 1–1
- Members: Joshua Balfour; James Walklin

Jerseys

Trinidad and Tobago made their World Cup of Darts debut at the 2026 tournament, after winning the Latin America and Caribbean Qualifier.

Year	Team		Seed	Result	Defeated by	Ref.
2026	Joshua Balfour	James Walklin	—N/a	G40	Italy	

== Uganda ==
Uganda
- Overall record: 0–0

Jerseys

Uganda were set to make their World Cup of Darts debut at the 2026 tournament, after winning the African Qualifier, but withdrew late on due to visa issues.

Year	Team		Seed	Result	Defeated by	Ref.
2026	Patrick Ocheng	Juma Said	—N/a	Withdrew		

== Ukraine ==
Ukraine
- Overall record: 0–2

Jerseys

Ukraine became one of three new nations participating in the World Cup, when they made their debut in 2023.

Year	Team		Seed	Result	Defeated by	Ref.
2023	Vladyslav Omelchenko	Ilya Pekaruk	—N/a	G40	France; N. Ireland	

== United States ==
United States
- Overall record: 11–18
- Best performance: Last 8: 2010, 2012
- Members: Adam Sevada; Stowe Buntz

Jerseys

The United States have appeared in every edition of the World Cup, reaching the last eight phase in each of the first two editions, but failing to progress further in subsequent years.

Year	Team		Seed	Result	Defeated by	Ref.
2010	Darin Young	Bill Davis	8	G8	Spain; Scotland	
2012	Darin Young	Gary Mawson	11	QF	England	
2013	Darin Young	Larry Butler	—N/a	G24	Germany; Finland	
2014	Darin Young	Larry Butler	16	2R	England	
2015	Darin Young	Larry Butler	—N/a	1R	Netherlands	
2016	Darin Young	Larry Butler	—N/a	1R	Philippines	
2017	Darin Young	Larry Butler	—N/a	2R	Netherlands	
2018	Darin Young	Larry Butler	—N/a	1R	Scotland	
2019	Darin Young	Chuck Puleo	—N/a	2R	Austria	
2020 (Note: Darin Young was qualified to make his return and remain ever present at the 2020 World Cup but withdrew and was replaced by Lauby after being medically diagnosed with vertigo.)	Danny Lauby	Chuck Puleo	—N/a	1R	Austria	
2021	Danny Lauby	Chuck Puleo	—N/a	2R	Australia	
2022	Danny Baggish	Jules van Dongen	—N/a	1R	Poland	
2023	Leonard Gates	Jules van Dongen	—N/a	G40	Austria	
2024	Danny Lauby	Jules van Dongen	16	G40	Italy; Portugal	
2025	Danny Lauby	Jules van Dongen	13	G40	Hong Kong	
2026	Adam Sevada	Stowe Buntz	—N/a	2R	Wales	

== Wales ==
Wales
- Overall record: 34–13
- Best performance: Winners (2): 2020, 2023
- Members: Jonny Clayton; Nick Kenny (darts player)

Jerseys

After four runners-up finishes in 2010, 2017, 2022, and 2025 the Welsh team have won the tournament twice in 2020, and 2023.

Year	Team		Seed	Result	Defeated by	Ref.
2010	Mark Webster	Barrie Bates	5	RU	United States (group); Netherlands (final)	
2012	Mark Webster	Richie Burnett	5	SF	England	
2013	Mark Webster	Richie Burnett	5	SF	England	
2014	Mark Webster	Richie Burnett	5	QF	Australia	
2015	Mark Webster	Jamie Lewis	7	1R	Hong Kong	
2016	Mark Webster	Gerwyn Price	5	2R	Canada	
2017	Mark Webster	Gerwyn Price	4	RU	Netherlands	
2018	Jonny Clayton	Gerwyn Price	5	QF	Australia	
2019	Jonny Clayton	Gerwyn Price	3	1R	Singapore	
2020	Jonny Clayton	Gerwyn Price	2	W	—N/a	
2021	Jonny Clayton	Gerwyn Price	2	SF	Scotland	
2022	Jonny Clayton	Gerwyn Price	2	RU	Australia	
2023	Jonny Clayton	Gerwyn Price	2	W	—	
2024 (Note: Gerwyn Price withdrew for medical reasons and was replaced with Jim Williams. As this was after the draw Wales's second seeding was maintained.)	Jonny Clayton	Jim Williams	2	2R	Croatia	
2025	Jonny Clayton	Gerwyn Price	2	RU	Northern Ireland	
2026 (Note: Gerwyn Price did not make himself available for selection and was replaced with Nick Kenny.)	Jonny Clayton	Nick Kenny	7	QF	England	
