= 2019 PDC World Cup of Darts =

2019 PDCWorld Cup of Darts

Tournament information
- Dates: 6–9 June 2019
- Venue: Barclaycard Arena
- Location: Hamburg
- Country: Germany
- Organisation(s): PDC
- Format: Legs
- Prize fund: £350,000
- Winner's share: £70,000
- High checkout: 160 (Czech Republic) Karel Sedláček (Singapore) Paul Lim

Champion(s)
- Scotland (Peter Wright and Gary Anderson)

The 2019 PDC World Cup of Darts, known as the 2019 BetVictor World Cup of Darts for sponsorship reasons, was the ninth edition of the PDC World Cup of Darts. It took place from 6–9 June 2019 at the Barclaycard Arena in Hamburg, Germany.

The Dutch pairing of Michael van Gerwen and Raymond van Barneveld were the reigning champions, after beating the Scottish duo Peter Wright and Gary Anderson 3–1 in the 2018 final. Although Van Gerwen was able to defend his title, Jermaine Wattimena was selected ahead of Van Barneveld for the Netherlands. However, they lost 2–1 to the Republic of Ireland in the semi-finals.

Wright and Anderson of Scotland won their first World Cup, defeating the Republic of Ireland team of William O'Connor and Steve Lennon 3–1 in the final.

== Format ==
The tournament remained at 32 teams this year, with the top 8 teams being seeded and the remaining 24 teams being unseeded in the first round. Like last year, there are no groups in 2019 with the tournament being a straight knockout.

First round: Best of nine legs doubles.
Second round, quarter and semi-finals: Two best of seven legs singles matches. If the scores are tied a best of seven legs doubles match will settle the match.
Final: Three points needed to win the title. Two best of seven legs singles matches are played followed by a best of seven doubles match. If necessary, one or two best of seven legs singles matches in reverse order are played to determine the champion.

== Prize money ==
Total prize money will rise to £350,000, £50,000 more than last year.

The prize money will be per team:

Position (no. of teams)		Prize money (Total: £350,000)
Winners	(1)	£70,000
Runners-Up	(1)	£40,000
Semi-finalists	(2)	£24,000
Quarter-finalists	(4)	£16,000
Last 16 (second round)	(8)	£8,000
Last 32 (first round)	(16)	£4,000

== Teams and seedings ==
The competing nations were confirmed on 29 March, with the only change from 2018 being the Philippines replacing Thailand. Later on 8 May, it was confirmed that Lithuania would replace Switzerland. The teams were fully confirmed on 12 May. On 5 June, it was confirmed that China's Qingyu Zhan was to be replaced by Yuanjun Liu due to a passport issue.

The Top 8 nations based on combined Order of Merit rankings on 12 May were seeded.

Seeded nations

Rank	Country	Entered players
1	England	Rob Cross and Michael Smith
2	Scotland	Gary Anderson and Peter Wright
3	Wales	Gerwyn Price and Jonny Clayton
4	Netherlands	Michael van Gerwen and Jermaine Wattimena
5	Australia	Simon Whitlock and Kyle Anderson
6	Northern Ireland	Daryl Gurney and Brendan Dolan
7	Belgium	Kim Huybrechts and Dimitri Van den Bergh
8	Austria	Mensur Suljović and Zoran Lerchbacher

Unseeded nations

Country	Entered players
Brazil	Diogo Portela and Artur Valle
Canada	Dawson Murschell and Jim Long
China	Xiaochen Zong and Yuanjun Liu
Czech Republic	Karel Sedláček and Pavel Jirkal
Denmark	Per Laursen and Niels Heinsøe
Finland	Marko Kantele and Kim Viljanen
Germany	Max Hopp and Martin Schindler
Gibraltar	Dyson Parody and Antony Lopez
Greece	John Michael and Veniamin Symeonidis
Hong Kong	Royden Lam and Kai Fan Leung
Hungary	Pál Székely and János Végső
Ireland	Steve Lennon and William O'Connor
Italy	Andrea Micheletti and Stefano Tomassetti
Japan	Seigo Asada and Haruki Muramatsu
Lithuania	Darius Labanauskas and Mindaugas Barauskas
New Zealand	Cody Harris and Haupai Puha
Philippines	Lourence Ilagan and Noel Malicdem
Poland	Krzysztof Ratajski and Tytus Kanik
Russia	Boris Koltsov and Aleksei Kadochnikov
Singapore	Paul Lim and Harith Lim
South Africa	Devon Petersen and Vernon Bouwers
Spain	Cristo Reyes and Toni Alcinas
Sweden	Dennis Nilsson and Magnus Caris
United States	Darin Young and Chuck Puleo

== Results ==
=== Draw ===
First round (best of 9 legs); 6–7 June
1	England 91.53	5
Philippines 87.59	1
Ireland 87.24	5
Greece 84.28	1
8	Austria 92.87	5
Russia 95.12	3
China 76.06	1
United States 79.21	5
5	Australia 86.68	5
Finland 85.31	4
Italy 95.47	3
Canada 97.56	5
4	Netherlands 92.78	5
Spain 84.85	0
Poland 92.33	5
Czech Republic 84.11	2
2	Scotland 101.55	5
Denmark 82.75	0
Brazil 78.43	1
Sweden 83.28	5
7	Belgium 91.04	5
Hong Kong 91.10	1
Hungary 73.92	1
Germany 87.09	5
6	Northern Ireland 82.92	4
South Africa 79.35	5
New Zealand 87.15	5
Lithuania 79.12	1
3	Wales 83.22	3
Singapore 92.51	5
Gibraltar 77.80	4
Japan 78.63	5

Second round (best of 3 matches); 8 June
1	England 98.70	3	1	0
Ireland 101.75	4	4	2
8	Austria 100.90	4	4	2
United States 85.91	1	0	0
5	Australia 84.28	3	3	0
Canada 86.77	4	4	2
4	Netherlands 91.86	4	4	2
Poland 90.66	2	1	0
2	Scotland 93.26	4	4	2
Sweden 76.52	0	2	0
7	Belgium 87.17	4	4	2
Germany 81.17	3	0	0
South Africa 85.29	0	4	2	1
New Zealand 89.36	4	0	4	2
Singapore 82.95	3	2	0
Japan 86.67	4	4	2

Quarter-finals (best of 3 matches); 9 June
Ireland 84.73	4	0	4	2
8	Austria 85.82	1	4	0	1
Canada 84.28	4	2	1	1
4	Netherlands 88.92	2	4	4	2
2	Scotland 105.35	4	4	2
7	Belgium 101.77	2	2	0
New Zealand 80.37	1	3	0
Japan 88.46	4	4	2

Semi-finals (best of 3 matches); 9 June
Ireland 91.64	3	4	4	2
4	Netherlands 86.75	4	1	0	1
2	Scotland 94.81	4	4	2
Japan 87.12	2	1	0

Final (best of 5 matches); 9 June
Ireland 91.57	4	2	0	1	1
2	Scotland 96.75	2	4	4	4	3

=== Second round ===
Two best of seven legs singles matches. If the scores were tied, a best of seven legs doubles match settled the match.

England (1)	Ireland	Score
Michael Smith 90.78	Steve Lennon 88.39	3–4
Rob Cross 106.62	William O'Connor 115.10	1–4
Final result		0–2

Austria (8)	United States	Score
Zoran Lerchbacher 88.34	Darin Young 87.00	4–1
Mensur Suljović 113.43	Chuck Puleo 84.81	4–0
Final result		2–0

Australia (5)	Canada	Score
Simon Whitlock 86.86	Dawson Murschell 88.61	3–4
Kyle Anderson 81.69	Jim Long 84.93	3–4
Final result		0–2

Netherlands (4)	Poland	Score
Michael van Gerwen 96.27	Krzysztof Ratajski 95.52	4–2
Jermaine Wattimena 87.44	Tytus Kanik 85.80	4–1
Final result		2–0

Scotland (2)	Sweden	Score
Gary Anderson 96.97	Magnus Caris 69.40	4–0
Peter Wright 89.54	Dennis Nilsson 83.63	4–2
Final result		2–0

Belgium (7)	Germany	Score
Kim Huybrechts 85.93	Martin Schindler 86.14	4–3
Dimitri Van den Bergh 88.41	Max Hopp 76.19	4–0
Final result		2–0

South Africa	New Zealand	Score
Vernon Bouwers 73.18	Cody Harris 84.68	0–4
Devon Petersen 101.09	Haupai Puha 97.11	4–0
Petersen & Bouwers 80.80	Harris & Puha 86.28	2–4
Final result		1–2

Singapore	Japan	Score
Paul Lim 81.21	Seigo Asada 85.68	3–4
Harith Lim 84.69	Haruki Muramatsu 86.29	2–4
Final result		0–2

=== Quarter-finals ===
Two best of seven legs singles matches. If the scores were tied, a best of seven legs doubles match settled the match.

Ireland	Austria (8)	Score
Steve Lennon 82.26	Zoran Lerchbacher 81.71	4–1
William O'Connor 84.80	Mensur Suljović 96.97	0–4
Lennon & O'Connor 87.13	Suljović & Lerchbacher 78.77	4–0
Final result		2–1

Canada	Netherlands (4)	Score
Dawson Murschell 84.75	Michael van Gerwen 84.82	4–2
Jim Long 80.28	Jermaine Wattimena 86.37	2–4
Murschell & Long 87.82	Van Gerwen & Wattimena 95.58	1–4
Final result		1–2

Scotland (2)	Belgium (7)	Score
Gary Anderson 100.41	Kim Huybrechts 99.99	4–2
Peter Wright 110.29	Dimitri Van den Bergh 103.54	4–2
Final result		2–0

New Zealand	Japan	Score
Cody Harris 81.48	Seigo Asada 92.11	1–4
Haupai Puha 79.26	Haruki Muramatsu 84.81	3–4
Final result		0–2

=== Semi-finals ===
Two best of seven legs singles matches. If the scores were tied, a best of seven legs doubles match will settle the match.

Ireland	Netherlands (4)	Score
Steve Lennon 88.91	Michael van Gerwen 93.46	3–4
William O'Connor 85.82	Jermaine Wattimena 75.96	4–1
Lennon & O'Connor 100.20	Van Gerwen & Wattimena 90.84	4–0
Final result		2–1

Scotland (2)	Japan	Score
Gary Anderson 100.48	Seigo Asada 100.16	4–2
Peter Wright 89.13	Haruki Muramatsu 74.07	4–1
Final result		2–0

=== Final ===
Three match wins were needed to win the title. Two best of seven legs singles matches followed by a best of seven doubles match. If necessary, one or two best of seven legs reverse singles matches were played to determine the champion.

Ireland	Scotland (2)	Score
Steve Lennon 98.93	Gary Anderson 94.71	4–2
William O'Connor 92.79	Peter Wright 96.73	2–4
Lennon & O'Connor 83.47	Anderson & Wright 96.97	0–4
Steve Lennon 91.08	Peter Wright 98.60	1–4
Final result		1–3
