= 2022 PDC World Cup of Darts =

Tournament information
- Dates: 16–19 June 2022
- Venue: Eissporthalle
- Location: Frankfurt, Germany
- Organisation(s): PDC
- Format: Legs
- Prize fund: £350,000
- Winner's share: £70,000
- High checkout: 170 Gerwyn Price; Kim Huybrechts

Champion(s)
- Australia (Damon Heta and Simon Whitlock)

The 2022 PDC World Cup of Darts, known as the 2022 Cazoo World Cup of Darts for sponsorship reasons, was the twelfth edition of the PDC World Cup of Darts. It took place from 16 to 19 June 2022 at the Eissporthalle in Frankfurt, Germany.

Scotland (Peter Wright and John Henderson) were the defending champions, after beating Austria (Mensur Suljović and Rowby-John Rodriguez) 3–1 in the 2021 final. However, they lost 2–0 to England (Michael Smith and James Wade) in the quarter-finals.

Australia (Damon Heta and Simon Whitlock) won their first World Cup, beating Wales (Jonny Clayton and Gerwyn Price) 3–1 in the final. Whitlock and Heta dedicated their victory to fellow Australian player Kyle Anderson, who had died ten months earlier. Anderson had represented his country four times in the World Cup alongside Whitlock from 2016 to 2019.

For the first time in the tournament's history, the eight seeds all made it to the quarter-final stage.

== Format ==
The tournament remained at 32 teams this year, with the top 8 teams being seeded and the remaining 24 teams being unseeded in the first round.

As with recent years, the tournament continued to be a straight knockout.

First round: Best of nine legs doubles.
Second round, quarter and semi-finals: Two best of seven legs singles matches. If the scores were tied, a best of seven legs doubles match settled the match.
Final: Three points needed to win the title. Two best of seven legs singles matches were played, followed by a best of seven doubles match. If necessary, one or two best of seven legs singles matches in reverse order were played to determine the champion.

There were rumours that a format shakeup, like with the 2022 Premier League Darts, might be in the offing, but that was put on hold for at least another year.

== Prize money ==
Total prize money remained at £350,000.

The prize money per team was:

| Position (no. of teams) | | Prize money (Total: £350,000) |
|---|---|---|
| Winners | (1) | £70,000 |
| Runners-Up | (1) | £40,000 |
| Semi-finalists | (2) | £24,000 |
| Quarter-finalists | (4) | £16,000 |
| Last 16 (second round) | (8) | £8,000 |
| Last 32 (first round) | (16) | £4,000 |

== Teams and seedings ==
On 23 May, the 32 competing countries were announced, with three changes from the 2021 tournament. Russia didn't participate owing to them being suspended because of the invasion in Ukraine, China couldn't compete owing to ongoing COVID-19 restrictions, and Greece weren't invited back. Returning after a one-year absence were Latvia and New Zealand, and returning after not appearing since the 2018 event were Switzerland.

All players named on the seeded nations are the top 2 of each nation on the PDC Order of Merit. Players on the unseeded nations list are players chosen by qualification tournaments specifically for this event.

On 6 May, it was confirmed that John Henderson would represent Scotland after winning the title as part of the 2021 team, despite him being the 6th ranked Scottish player on the Order of Merit. On 30 May, it was announced that Dutch number one Michael van Gerwen had withdrawn due to required arm surgery, and he was replaced by Dutch number three Dirk van Duijvenbode.

The pairings were officially confirmed on 1 June.

The Top 8 nations based on combined Order of Merit rankings were seeded.

Seeded nations

| Rank | Country | Entered players |
|---|---|---|
| 1 | England | Michael Smith and James Wade |
| 2 | Wales | Gerwyn Price and Jonny Clayton |
| 3 | Netherlands | Danny Noppert and Dirk van Duijvenbode |
| 4 | Belgium | Dimitri Van den Bergh and Kim Huybrechts |
| 5 | Australia | Damon Heta and Simon Whitlock |
| 6 | Northern Ireland | Daryl Gurney and Brendan Dolan |
| 7 | Germany | Gabriel Clemens and Martin Schindler |
| 8 | Scotland | Peter Wright and John Henderson |

Unseeded Nations

| Country | Entered players |
|---|---|
| Austria | Mensur Suljović and Rowby-John Rodriguez |
| Brazil | Diogo Portela and Artur Valle |
| Canada | Jeff Smith and Matt Campbell |
| Czech Republic | Adam Gawlas and Karel Sedláček |
| Denmark | Vladimir Andersen and Andreas Toft Jørgensen |
| Finland | Marko Kantele and Aki Paavilainen |
| Gibraltar | Justin Hewitt and Craig Galliano |
| Hong Kong | Lee Lok Yin and Ching Ho Tung |
| Hungary | Gergely Lakatos and Nándor Prés |
| Ireland | William O'Connor and Steve Lennon |
| Italy | Giuseppe di Rocco and Gabriel Rollo |
| Japan | Toru Suzuki and Tomoya Goto |
| Latvia | Madars Razma and Nauris Gleglu |
| Lithuania | Darius Labanauskas and Mindaugas Barauskas |
| New Zealand | Ben Robb and Warren Parry |
| Philippines | Lourence Ilagan and RJ Escaros |
| Poland | Krzysztof Ratajski and Sebastian Białecki |
| Portugal | José de Sousa and Vítor Jerónimo |
| Singapore | Paul Lim and Harith Lim |
| South Africa | Devon Petersen and Stefan Vermaak |
| Spain | José Justicia and Tony Martinez |
| Sweden | Daniel Larsson and Johan Engström |
| Switzerland | Stefan Bellmont and Thomas Junghans |
| United States | Danny Baggish and Jules van Dongen |

== Results ==
=== Draw ===
The draw was made on 9 June by Barry Hearn.

First round (best of 9 legs); 16–17 June
1 | England 98.86 | 5
Czech Republic 91.62 | 1
Latvia 91.78 | 5
Hungary 72.44 | 1
8 | Scotland 88.38 | 5
Hong Kong 83.54 | 1
Portugal 80.39 | 5
Italy 72.69 | 3
4 | Belgium 91.71 | 5
Japan 75.03 | 2
Poland 85.13 | 5
United States 81.49 | 4
5 | Australia 90.48 | 5
Lithuania 80.46 | 2
Sweden 88.33 | 5
South Africa 88.32 | 2
2 | Wales 99.17 | 5
Philippines 83.88 | 2
Austria 82.71 | 5
Finland 81.16 | 3
7 | Germany 84.02 | 5
Spain 82.67 | 4
Denmark 83.88 | 5
Singapore 72.53 | 2
3 | Netherlands 87.38 | 5
Brazil 78.74 | 0
Ireland 88.26 | 5
Canada 80.84 | 2
6 | Northern Ireland 80.27 | 5
Gibraltar 81.19 | 3
New Zealand 79.42 | 5
Switzerland 72.62 | 3

Second round (best of 3 matches); 18 June
1 | England 92.48 | 4 | 3 | 4 | 2
Latvia 85.20 | 0 | 4 | 2 | 1
8 | Scotland 82.94 | 4 | 3 | 4 | 2
Portugal 80.83 | 0 | 4 | 0 | 1
4 | Belgium 91.56 | 4 | 4 | 2
Poland 88.39 | 1 | 2 | 0
5 | Australia 85.83 | 4 | 3 | 4 | 2
Sweden 78.95 | 3 | 4 | 1 | 1
2 | Wales 93.17 | 4 | 2 | 4 | 2
Austria 89.88 | 3 | 4 | 3 | 1
7 | Germany 93.26 | 4 | 4 | 2
Denmark 88.34 | 1 | 1 | 0
3 | Netherlands 104.81 | 4 | 4 | 2
Ireland 85.55 | 1 | 1 | 0
6 | Northern Ireland 95.88 | 4 | 4 | 2
New Zealand 85.46 | 2 | 2 | 0

Quarter-finals (best of 3 matches); 19 June
1 | England 85.17 | 4 | 4 | 2
8 | Scotland 81.47 | 0 | 1 | 0
4 | Belgium 91.98 | 4 | 3 | 0 | 1
5 | Australia 102.90 | 2 | 4 | 4 | 2
2 | Wales 102.81 | 4 | 4 | 2
7 | Germany 95.49 | 0 | 2 | 0
3 | Netherlands 93.27 | 4 | 4 | 2
6 | Northern Ireland 89.13 | 2 | 3 | 0

Semi-finals (best of 3 matches); 19 June
1 | England 93.00 | 3 | 0 | 0
5 | Australia 95.72 | 4 | 4 | 2
2 | Wales 93.09 | 4 | 4 | 2
3 | Netherlands 90.57 | 1 | 2 | 0

Final (best of 5 matches); 19 June
5 | Australia 92.80 | 4 | 4 | 3 | 4 | 3
2 | Wales 89.22 | 0 | 2 | 4 | 2 | 1

=== Second round ===
Two best of seven legs singles matches. If the scores were tied, a best of seven legs doubles match settled the match.

| England (1) | Latvia | Legs |
|---|---|---|
| Michael Smith 100.20 | Nauris Gleglu 75.44 | 4–0 |
| James Wade 85.57 | Madars Razma 87.69 | 3–4 |
| Smith & Wade 96.35 | Gleglu & Razma 88.05 | 4–2 |
| Result | | 2–1 |

| Scotland (8) | Portugal | Legs |
|---|---|---|
| John Henderson 75.15 | Vítor Jerónimo 63.08 | 4–0 |
| Peter Wright 92.27 | José de Sousa 97.63 | 3–4 |
| Henderson & Wright 78.08 | Jerónimo & De Sousa 75.76 | 4–0 |
| Result | | 2–1 |

| Belgium (4) | Poland | Legs |
|---|---|---|
| Dimitri Van den Bergh 92.48 | Krzysztof Ratajski 87.83 | 4–1 |
| Kim Huybrechts 90.80 | Sebastian Białecki 88.82 | 4–2 |
| Result | | 2–0 |

| Australia (5) | Sweden | Legs |
|---|---|---|
| Simon Whitlock 85.36 | Johan Engström 79.27 | 4–3 |
| Damon Heta 87.72 | Daniel Larsson 81.68 | 3–4 |
| Whitlock & Heta 84.03 | Engström & Larsson 74.71 | 4–1 |
| Result | | 2–1 |

| Wales (2) | Austria | Legs |
|---|---|---|
| Gerwyn Price 94.62 | Mensur Suljović 97.11 | 4–3 |
| Jonny Clayton 96.75 | Rowby-John Rodriguez 94.74 | 2–4 |
| Price & Clayton 89.07 | Suljović & Rodriguez 79.92 | 4–3 |
| Result | | 2–1 |

| Germany (7) | Denmark | Legs |
|---|---|---|
| Martin Schindler 93.00 | Vladimir Andersen 89.85 | 4–1 |
| Gabriel Clemens 93.53 | Andreas Toft Jørgensen 86.89 | 4–1 |
| Result | | 2–0 |

| Netherlands (3) | Ireland | Legs |
|---|---|---|
| Danny Noppert 99.53 | William O'Connor 85.86 | 4–1 |
| Dirk van Duijvenbode 110.64 | Steve Lennon 85.18 | 4–1 |
| Result | | 2–0 |

| Northern Ireland (6) | New Zealand | Legs |
|---|---|---|
| Daryl Gurney 93.19 | Ben Robb 85.58 | 4–2 |
| Brendan Dolan 98.70 | Warren Parry 85.33 | 4–2 |
| Result | | 2–0 |

=== Quarter-finals ===
Two best of seven legs singles matches. If the scores were tied, a best of seven legs doubles match settled the match.

| England (1) | Scotland (8) | Legs |
|---|---|---|
| Michael Smith 91.09 | John Henderson 80.38 | 4–0 |
| James Wade 80.83 | Peter Wright 82.25 | 4–1 |
| Result | | 2–0 |

| Belgium (4) | Australia (5) | Legs |
|---|---|---|
| Dimitri Van den Bergh 93.98 | Damon Heta 100.08 | 4–2 |
| Kim Huybrechts 92.59 | Simon Whitlock 101.79 | 3–4 |
| Van den Bergh & Huybrechts 87.24 | Heta & Whitlock 109.31 | 0–4 |
| Result | | 1–2 |

| Wales (2) | Germany (7) | Legs |
|---|---|---|
| Gerwyn Price 117.88 | Martin Schindler 101.31 | 4–0 |
| Jonny Clayton 94.27 | Gabriel Clemens 92.32 | 4–2 |
| Result | | 2–0 |

| Netherlands (3) | Northern Ireland (6) | Legs |
|---|---|---|
| Danny Noppert 93.73 | Daryl Gurney 92.93 | 4–2 |
| Dirk van Duijvenbode 92.89 | Brendan Dolan 86.08 | 4–3 |
| Result | | 2–0 |

=== Semi-finals ===
Two best of seven legs singles matches. If the scores were tied, a best of seven legs doubles match settled the match.

| England (1) | Australia (5) | Legs |
|---|---|---|
| Michael Smith 97.47 | Damon Heta 91.21 | 3–4 |
| James Wade 85.00 | Simon Whitlock 103.66 | 0–4 |
| Result | | 0–2 |

| Wales (2) | Netherlands (3) | Legs |
|---|---|---|
| Gerwyn Price 88.75 | Danny Noppert 84.90 | 4–1 |
| Jonny Clayton 97.71 | Dirk van Duijvenbode 96.44 | 4–2 |
| Result | | 2–0 |

=== Final ===
Three match wins were needed to win the title. Two best of seven legs singles matches followed by a best of seven doubles match. If necessary, one or two best of seven legs reverse singles matches were played to determine the champion.

| Australia (5) | Wales (2) | Legs |
|---|---|---|
| Damon Heta 92.49 | Gerwyn Price 80.00 | 4–0 |
| Simon Whitlock 88.98 | Jonny Clayton 90.03 | 4–2 |
| Heta & Whitlock 91.26 | Price & Clayton 94.77 | 3–4 |
| Damon Heta 99.03 | Jonny Clayton 88.65 | 4–2 |
| Result | | 3–1 |
