= 2012 PDC World Cup of Darts =

Tournament information
- Dates: 3–5 February 2012
- Venue: Alsterdorfer Sporthalle
- Location: Hamburg
- Country: Germany
- Organisation(s): PDC
- Format: Legs
- Prize fund: £150,000
- Winner's share: £40,000
- High checkout: 161 (England) Adrian Lewis (2x)

Champion(s)
- England (Phil Taylor and Adrian Lewis)

The 2012 PDC World Cup of Darts, known as the 2012 Cash Converters World Cup of Darts for sponsorship reasons, was the second edition of the PDC World Cup of Darts which took place between 3–5 February 2012 at the Alsterdorfer Sporthalle in Hamburg, Germany.

The Netherlands were the defending champions after the pair of Raymond van Barneveld and Co Stompé defeated Wales, represented by Mark Webster and Barrie Bates in the final on 5 December 2010.

England (represented by Phil Taylor and Adrian Lewis) won the tournament, beating Australia (represented by Simon Whitlock and Paul Nicholson) 4–3 in a sudden-death leg.

== Format ==
24 countries in the PDC Order of Merit at the end of 4 January after the 2012 PDC World Darts Championship were represented at the PDC World Cup of Darts, with 19 from the 2010 edition to return, and the five others replaced by the Philippines, Malaysia, South Africa, Croatia and Hungary. Each nation's top ranked player was joined by the second highest player of that country. For seeding the average rankings of the players was used, with the top 8 nations automatically starting in round 2 and the other 16 nations starting in round 1.

The round 1 matches were shortened from best of 11 to best of 9 legs in doubles compared to 2010. The winners of round 1 played one of the top eight ranked teams in round 2, and it used the same format as the group stage in 2010, except that the sets were increased from best of 5 to best of 7 legs for singles and best of 9 legs for doubles matches. Two singles matches and a doubles match, with 1 point awarded for a singles win and 2 points awarded for a doubles win. If the match score was 2–2 at the end of the match, then a sudden-death doubles leg decided who got through. The fixtures remained the same, the top ranked player in the country faced the second highest ranked player in the country. Another change have seen the winners of round 2 qualify for the quarter-finals, which replaced the group stage. The quarter-finals used the same format as round 2, except that the doubles matches were best of 7 legs. The semi-finals and final used the same format used in 2010, except that the sets were reduced from best of 11 to best of 7 and from best of 15 to best of 13 respectively.

== Prize money ==
Position (no. of teams)		Prize money (Total: £150,000)
Winners	(1)	£40,000
Runners-Up	(1)	£20,000
Semi-finalists	(2)	£13,000
Quarter-finalists	(4)	£6,000
Last 16 (second round)	(8)	£3,000
Last 24 (first round)	(8)	£2,000

== Teams and seeding ==
Five teams made their debut in the 2012 World Cup. South Africa became the first African team to participate, they were joined by Croatia, Hungary, Malaysia and the Philippines. They replaced the Czech Republic, Poland, Russia, Slovakia and Slovenia.

Rank	Country	Top Two Ranked Players	Start In
1	England	Phil Taylor and Adrian Lewis	Round 2
2	Australia	Simon Whitlock and Paul Nicholson	Round 2
3	Netherlands	Raymond van Barneveld and Vincent van der Voort	Round 2
4	Scotland	Gary Anderson and Peter Wright	Round 2
5	Wales	Mark Webster and Richie Burnett	Round 2
6	Northern Ireland	Brendan Dolan and Mickey Mansell	Round 2
7	Belgium	Kim Huybrechts and Kurt van de Rijck	Round 2
8	Germany	Jyhan Artut and Bernd Roith	Round 2
9	Canada	John Part and Ken MacNeil	Round 1
10	Ireland	William O'Connor and Mick McGowan	Round 1
11	United States	Darin Young and Gary Mawson	Round 1
12	Austria	Mensur Suljović and Dietmar Burger	Round 1
13	Sweden	Magnus Caris and Dennis Nilsson	Round 1
14	Spain	Antonio Alcinas and Carlos Rodríguez	Round 1
15	Finland	Petri Korte and Marko Kantele	Round 1
16	Gibraltar	Dylan Duo and Dyson Parody	Round 1
17	Denmark	Per Laursen and Jann Hoffmann	Round 1
18	Croatia	Boris Krčmar and Tonči Restović	Round 1
19	South Africa	Devon Petersen and Shawn Hogan	Round 1
20	Japan	Haruki Muramatsu and Morihiro Hashimoto	Round 1
21	New Zealand	Warren French and Preston Ridd	Round 1
22	Philippines	Christian Perez and Lourence Ilagan	Round 1
23	Malaysia	Lee Choon Peng and Amin Bin Abdul Ghani	Round 1
24	Hungary	Nándor Bezzeg and Krisztián Kaufmann	Round 1

== Main draw ==
The bracket from the last 16 and the preliminary round matches were announced on 9 January 2012. The preliminary round teams were drawn against the seeded teams with pairings announced on 25 January 2012.

First round (best of 9 legs); 3 February
9	Canada 67.85	5
24	Hungary 70.23	3
11	United States 87.79	5
22	Philippines 77.24	3
15	Finland 75.84	4
18	Croatia 77.30	5
14	Spain 77.85	2
19	South Africa 86.97	5
10	Ireland 88.35	5
23	Malaysia 76.75	2
13	Sweden 89.47	5
20	Japan 79.88	2
16	Gibraltar 75.84	4
17	Denmark 77.12	5
12	Austria 80.21	5
21	New Zealand 68.03	2

Second round (first to 3 points); 3–4 February
1	England 92.03	3	3	5	1^{S}	2
9	Canada 84.82	4	4	3	0	2
8	Germany 86.05	4	2	4	1
11	United States 85.99	3	4	5	2
5	Wales 95.85	4	4	5	3
18	Croatia 85.20	0	3	1	0
4	Scotland 91.87	4	4	3	0	2
19	South Africa 88.02	3	1	5	1^{S}	2
2	Australia 88.78	4	4	5	3
10	Ireland 76.91	1	1	2	0
7	Belgium 86.40	4	2	5	2
13	Sweden 81.59	2	4	2	1
6	Northern Ireland 82.19	3	4	5	2
17	Denmark 77.45	4	1	4	1
3	Netherlands 88.33	4	3	5	2
12	Austria 87.48	3	4	2	1

Quarter-finals (first to 3 points); 4 February
1	England 88.87	3	4	4	2
11	United States 86.56	4	3	2	1
5	Wales 94.87	4	3	4	2
19	South Africa 91.69	0	4	3	1
2	Australia 97.42	4	2	4	2
7	Belgium 93.87	0	4	2	1
6	Northern Ireland 89.02	3	2	3	0
3	Netherlands 92.63	4	4	4	3

Semi-finals (first to 4 points); 5 February
1	England 97.57	1	4	4	4	4	4
5	Wales 90.62	4	0	1	3	2	1
2	Australia 91.30	4	0	4	4	4	4
3	Netherlands 85.53	3	4	2	2	0	1

Final (first to 4 points); 5 February
1	England 94.99	7	7	7	4	4	1^{S}	4
2	Australia 90.74	4	5	6	7	7	0	2

^{S}If the score was tied after the doubles match (worth 2 points), a sudden death doubles leg was played to progress.

== Results ==
=== Second round ===
The singles matches (which were best of 7 legs) took place in the evening session on 3 February, with the doubles matches (which were best of 9 legs) taking place in the afternoon session on 4 February.

Country	Points	Country
90.50 Northern Ireland (6)	3 – 1	Denmark (17) 84.25
Player(s)	Legs	Player(s)
77.66 Brendan Dolan	3 – 4	Jann Hoffmann 81.66
85.00 Mickey Mansell	4 – 1	Per Laursen 68.35
83.92 Dolan & Mansell	5 – 4	Hoffmann & Laursen 79.23

Country	Points	Country
86.40 Belgium (7)	3 – 1	Sweden (13) 81.59
Player(s)	Legs	Player(s)
93.55 Kim Huybrechts	4 – 2	Dennis Nilsson 80.16
78.46 Kurt van de Rijck	2 – 4	Magnus Caris 81.66
87.08 Huybrechts & van de Rijck	5 – 2	Nilsson & Caris 77.92

Country	Points	Country
88.78 Australia (2)	4 – 0	Ireland (10) 76.91
Player(s)	Legs	Player(s)
89.73 Simon Whitlock	4 – 1	Mick McGowan 78.00
91.09 Paul Nicholson	4 – 1	William O'Connor 81.26
85.53 Whitlock & Nicholson	5 – 2	McGowan & O'Connor 71.47

Country	Points	Country
95.85 Wales (5)	4 – 0	Croatia (18) 85.20
Player(s)	Legs	Player(s)
91.09 Mark Webster	4 – 0	Tonči Restović 71.83
97.35 Richie Burnett	4 – 3	Boris Krčmar 89.26
97.28 Webster & Burnett	5 – 1	Restović & Krčmar 83.10

Country	Points	Country
86.05 Germany (8)	1 – 3	United States (11) 85.99
Player(s)	Legs	Player(s)
83.79 Jyhan Artut	4 – 3	Gary Mawson 82.40
79.29 Bernd Roith	2 – 4	Darin Young 81.66
92.32 Artut & Roith	4 – 5	Mawson & Young 90.65

Country	Points	Country
91.87 Scotland (2)	2 – 3	South Africa (19) 88.02
Player(s)	Legs	Player(s)
91.29 Gary Anderson	4 – 3	Shawn Hogan 84.85
94.20 Peter Wright	4 – 1	Devon Petersen 86.41
90.13 Anderson & Wright	3 – 5	Hogan & Petersen 91.81

- Hogan & Petersen won the sudden death doubles leg to progress to the quarter-finals.

Country	Points	Country
92.03 England (1)	3 – 2	Canada (9) 84.82
Player(s)	Legs	Player(s)
92.28 Phil Taylor	3 – 4	Ken MacNeil 90.46
93.40 Adrian Lewis	3 – 4	John Part 86.50
90.42 Taylor & Lewis	5 – 3	MacNeil & Part 77.51

- Taylor & Lewis won the sudden death doubles leg to progress to the quarter-finals.

Country	Points	Country
88.33 Netherlands (3)	3 – 1	Austria (12) 87.48
Player(s)	Legs	Player(s)
87.86 Raymond van Barneveld	4 – 3	Dietmar Burger 88.78
87.86 Vincent van der Voort	3 – 4	Mensur Suljović 90.28
89.27 van Barneveld & van der Voort	5 – 2	Burger & Suljović 83.38

=== Quarter-finals ===
All matches (which were best of 7 legs) took place in the evening session on 4 February.

Country	Points	Country
97.42 Australia (2)	3 – 1	Belgium (7) 93.87
Player(s)	Legs	Player(s)
93.93 Simon Whitlock	4 – 0	Kurt van de Rijck 80.46
94.98 Paul Nicholson	2 – 4	Kim Huybrechts 98.10
102.18 Whitlock & Nicholson	4 – 2	van de Rijck & Huybrechts 98.58

Country	Points	Country
94.87 Wales (5)	3 – 1	South Africa (19) 91.69
Player(s)	Legs	Player(s)
98.55 Mark Webster	4 – 0	Shawn Hogan 71.04
99.81 Richie Burnett	3 – 4	Devon Petersen 101.52
86.22 Webster & Burnett	4 – 3	Hogan & Petersen 93.65

Country	Points	Country
88.87 England (1)	3 – 1	United States (11) 86.56
Player(s)	Legs	Player(s)
97.26 Phil Taylor	3 – 4	Gary Mawson 91.41
83.49 Adrian Lewis	4 – 3	Darin Young 87.21
85.83 Taylor & Lewis	4 – 2	Mawson & Young 83.37

Country	Points	Country
89.02 Northern Ireland (6)	0 – 4	Netherlands (3) 92.63
Player(s)	Legs	Player(s)
80.10 Brendan Dolan	3 – 4	Vincent van der Voort 90.09
98.28 Mickey Mansell	2 – 4	Raymond van Barneveld 101.40
88.68 Dolan & Mansell	3 – 4	van der Voort & van Barneveld 86.40

=== Semi-finals ===
All matches (which were best of 7 legs) took place in the afternoon session on 5 February. Four points were needed to win the tie.

Country	Points	Country
91.30 Australia (2)	5 – 1	Netherlands (3) 85.53
Player(s)	Legs	Player(s)
94.62 Simon Whitlock	4 – 3	Vincent van der Voort 87.27
83.79 Paul Nicholson	0 – 4	Raymond van Barneveld 100.20
95.34 Simon Whitlock	4 – 2	Raymond van Barneveld 91.44
89.40 Paul Nicholson	4 – 2	Vincent van der Voort 74.82
89.73 Whitlock & Nicholson	4 – 0	van der Voort & van Barneveld 73.92

Country	Points	Country
89.02 England (1)	5 – 1	Wales (5) 92.63
Player(s)	Legs	Player(s)
95.28 Phil Taylor	1 – 4	Richie Burnett 108.93
105.48 Adrian Lewis	4 – 0	Mark Webster 82.86
96.51 Phil Taylor	4 – 1	Mark Webster 86.46
93.00 Adrian Lewis	4 – 3	Richie Burnett 87.63
97.59 Taylor & Lewis	4 – 2	Burnett & Webster 87.24

=== Final ===
All matches (which were best of 13 legs) took place in the evening session on 5 February. Four points were needed to win the title.

Country	Points	Country
94.99 England (1)	4 – 3	Australia (2) 90.74
Player(s)	Legs	Player(s)
97.20 Phil Taylor	7 – 4	Paul Nicholson 89.55
93.69 Adrian Lewis	7 – 5	Simon Whitlock 91.80
105.93 Phil Taylor	7 – 6	Simon Whitlock 97.86
84.69 Adrian Lewis	4 – 7	Paul Nicholson 82.23
91.59 Taylor & Lewis	4 – 7	Nicholson & Whitlock 91.68

*Taylor & Lewis won the sudden death doubles leg to win the tournament.

== Television coverage ==
The tournament was broadcast by Sky Sports in the UK and Ireland, RTL 7 in the Netherlands, Fox Sports in Australia and OSN Showtime Network in the Middle East and North Africa.
