= 2015 PDC World Cup of Darts =

Tournament information
- Dates: 11–14 June 2015
- Venue: Eissporthalle
- Location: Frankfurt
- Country: Germany
- Organisation(s): PDC
- Format: Legs
- Prize fund: £250,000
- Winner's share: £50,000
- High checkout: 150 (Netherlands) Michael van Gerwen (Scotland) Gary Anderson

Champion(s)
- England (Phil Taylor and Adrian Lewis)

The 2015 PDC World Cup of Darts, known as the 2015 bwin World Cup of Darts for sponsorship reasons, was the fifth edition of the PDC World Cup of Darts which took place between 11–14 June 2015 at the Eissporthalle in Frankfurt, Germany.

The Netherlands pairing of Michael van Gerwen and Raymond van Barneveld were the defending champions, but they were defeated in the semi-finals by Scotland's Gary Anderson and Peter Wright.

England with Phil Taylor and Adrian Lewis won their third title in the event by defeating Scotland's Anderson and Wright 3–2 in the final.

== Format ==
The tournament remained at 32 teams this year. 16 teams were seeded and drawn to face the remaining 16 teams in the first round. Like last year, there are no groups in 2015 with the tournament being a straight knockout.

First round: Best of nine legs doubles.
Second round, quarter and semi-finals: Two best of seven legs singles matches. If the scores are tied a best of seven legs doubles match will settle the match.
Final: Three points needed to win the title. Two best of seven legs singles matches are played followed by a best of seven doubles match. If necessary, one or two best of seven legs singles matches in reverse order are played to determine the champion.

== Prize money ==
Prize money was raised to £250,000 from last year's £200,000 prize fund. The prize money was per team:

Position (no. of teams)		Prize money (Total: £250,000)
Winners	(1)	£50,000
Runners-Up	(1)	£26,000
Semi-finalists	(2)	£15,000
Quarter-finalists	(4)	£10,000
Last 16 (second round)	(8)	£7,000
Last 32 (first round)	(16)	£3,000

== Teams and seeding ==
There were only two changes from the 2014 tournament. France and Malaysia were replaced with the Philippines and the Czech Republic, who made their long-awaited debut, after having to withdraw from the 2010 PDC World Cup of Darts, owing to adverse weather conditions.

Seeded nations

Rank	Country	Top two ranked players
1	England	Phil Taylor and Adrian Lewis
2	Scotland	Gary Anderson and Peter Wright
3	Netherlands	Michael van Gerwen and Raymond van Barneveld
4	Australia	Simon Whitlock and Paul Nicholson
5	Belgium	Kim Huybrechts and Ronny Huybrechts
6	Northern Ireland	Brendan Dolan and Mickey Mansell
7	Wales	Mark Webster and Jamie Lewis
8	Austria	Mensur Suljović and Rowby-John Rodriguez
9	Germany	Jyhan Artut and Max Hopp
10	Ireland	Connie Finnan and William O'Connor
11	Canada	John Part and Ken MacNeil
12	Spain	Cristo Reyes and Antonio Alcinas
13	Gibraltar	Dyson Parody and Manuel Vilerio
14	South Africa	Devon Petersen and Graham Filby
15	Sweden	Magnus Caris and Daniel Larsson
16	Japan	Haruki Muramatsu and Morihiro Hashimoto

Unseeded nations (alphabetic order)

Country	Top two ranked players
China	Jun Chen and Xuejie Huang
Czech Republic	Michal Kočík and Pavel Jirkal
Denmark	Per Laursen and Per Skau
Finland	Kim Viljanen and Marko Kantele
Hong Kong	Scott MacKenzie and Royden Lam
Hungary	Nándor Bezzeg and Gábor Takács
India	Ashfaque Sayed and Nitin Kumar
Italy	Daniele Petri and Marco Brentegani
New Zealand	Rob Szabo and Warren Parry
Norway	Robert Wagner and Vegar Elvevoll
Philippines	Lourence Ilagan and Gilbert Ulang
Poland	Tytus Kanik and Mariusz Paul
Russia	Boris Koltsov and Aleksei Kadochnikov
Singapore	Paul Lim and Harith Lim
Thailand	Thanawat Yong and Attapol Eupakaree
United States	Darin Young and Larry Butler

== Results ==
=== Draw ===
The draw was made on 27 May by Rod Harrington and Mark Paul.

First round (best of 9 legs); 11–12 June
1	England 87.38	5
Denmark 73.63	0
16	Japan 82.58	5
China 80.89	0
8	Austria 83.90	5
Czech Republic 77.19	2
9	Germany 81.68	5
India 67.73	0
5	Belgium 93.92	5
Philippines 87.78	1
12	Spain 90.54	5
Norway 71.54	0
4	Australia 82.94	5
Russia 78.61	1
13	Gibraltar 71.60	5
Italy 71.35	2
2	Scotland 92.71	5
Singapore 85.09	1
15	Sweden 78.73	2
Hungary 81.52	5
7	Wales 80.15	3
Hong Kong 85.74	5
10	Ireland 81.68	5
Poland 69.53	0
6	Northern Ireland 82.06	5
Thailand 81.36	2
11	Canada 79.86	4
New Zealand 82.79	5
3	Netherlands 91.13	5
United States 89.06	2
14	South Africa 85.16	5
Finland 81.72	4

Second round (best of 3 matches); 13 June
1	England 91.67	4	4	2
16	Japan 75.65	0	1	0
8	Austria 85.30	3	2	0
9	Germany 88.88	4	4	2
5	Belgium 90.90	4	4	2
12	Spain 85.94	1	1	0
4	Australia 80.34	4	4	2
13	Gibraltar 71.94	0	3	0
2	Scotland 93.08	4	4	2
Hungary 73.40	2	0	0
Hong Kong 84.52	4	3	4	2
10	Ireland 84.69	1	4	3	1
6	Northern Ireland 96.80	4	4	2
New Zealand 80.07	1	0	0
3	Netherlands 102.70	4	4	2
14	South Africa 81.24	0	1	0

Quarter-finals (best of 3 matches); 14 June
1	England 104.89	4	4	2
9	Germany 87.12	1	0	0
5	Belgium 86.59	2	4	4	2
4	Australia 84.86	4	3	2	1
2	Scotland 90.21	4	4	2
Hong Kong 85.57	2	2	0
6	Northern Ireland 93.53	2	4	0	1
3	Netherlands 98.58	4	3	4	2

Semi-finals (best of 3 matches); 14 June
1	England 99.83	4	4	2
5	Belgium 92.74	3	2	0
2	Scotland 100.48	3	4	4	2
3	Netherlands 94.24	4	1	1	1

Final (best of 5 matches); 14 June
1	England 102.73	4	1	4	1	4	3
2	Scotland 101.70	0	4	3	4	1	2

=== Second round ===
Two best of seven legs singles matches. If the scores were tied, a best of seven legs doubles match will settle the match.

England (1)	Japan (16)	Score
Phil Taylor 93.94	Haruki Muramatsu 73.40	4–0
Adrian Lewis 89.39	Morihiro Hashimoto 77.45	4–1
Final result		2–0

Austria (8)	Germany (9)	Score
Rowby-John Rodriguez 82.40	Jyhan Artut 88.43	3–4
Mensur Suljović 88.20	Max Hopp 89.32	2–4
Final result		0–2

Belgium (5)	Spain (12)	Score
Ronny Huybrechts 88.28	Cristo Reyes 85.70	4–1
Kim Huybrechts 93.52	Toni Alcinas 86.17	4–1
Final result		2–0

Australia (4)	Gibraltar (13)	Score
Simon Whitlock 76.10	Dyson Parody 66.77	4–0
Paul Nicholson 82.76	Manuel Vilerio 74.89	4–3
Final result		2–0

Scotland (2)	Hungary	Score
Gary Anderson 87.59	Nándor Bezzeg 76.07	4–2
Peter Wright 98.56	Gábor Takács 69.40	4–0
Final result		2–0

Hong Kong	Ireland (10)	Score
Royden Lam 90.55	William O'Connor 85.38	4–1
Scott MacKenzie 74.81	Connie Finnan 82.82	3–4
Lam & MacKenzie 88.19	O'Connor & Finnan 85.88	4–3
Final result		2–1

Northern Ireland (6)	New Zealand	Score
Brendan Dolan 97.89	Rob Szabo 84.04	4–1
Mickey Mansell 95.43	Warren Parry 75.10	4–0
Final result		2–0

Netherlands (3)	South Africa (14)	Score
Michael van Gerwen 105.47	Graham Filby 73.88	4–0
Raymond van Barneveld 99.93	Devon Petersen 87.12	4–1
Final result		2–0

=== Quarter-finals ===
Two best of seven legs singles matches. If the scores were tied, a best of seven legs doubles match will settle the match.

England (1)	Germany (9)	Score
Phil Taylor 104.31	Jyhan Artut 92.52	4–1
Adrian Lewis 105.47	Max Hopp 80.37	4–0
Final result		2–0

Belgium (5)	Australia (4)	Score
Ronny Huybrechts 85.77	Simon Whitlock 90.71	2–4
Kim Huybrechts 80.64	Paul Nicholson 76.99	4–3
R. Huybrechts & K. Huybrechts 93.35	Whitlock & Nicholson 86.87	4–2
Final result		2–1

Scotland (2)	Hong Kong	Score
Gary Anderson 90.54	Royden Lam 88.32	4–2
Peter Wright 89.88	Scott MacKenzie 82.82	4–2
Final result		2–0

Northern Ireland (6)	Netherlands (3)	Score
Brendan Dolan 86.97	Michael van Gerwen 91.84	2–4
Mickey Mansell 99.80	Raymond van Barneveld 96.55	4–3
Dolan & Mansell 92.39	van Gerwen & van Barneveld 107.36	0–4
Final result		1–2

=== Semi-finals ===
Two best of seven legs singles matches. If the scores were tied, a best of seven legs doubles match will settle the match.

England (1)	Belgium (5)	Score
Phil Taylor 102.48	Ronny Huybrechts 91.93	4–3
Adrian Lewis 96.73	Kim Huybrechts 93.55	4–2
Final result		2–0

Scotland (2)	Netherlands (3)	Score
Peter Wright 103.27	Michael van Gerwen 106.57	3–4
Gary Anderson 97.22	Raymond van Barneveld 81.88	4–1
Wright & Anderson 99.82	van Gerwen & van Barneveld 89.33	4–1
Final result		2–1

=== Final ===
Three match wins were needed to win the title. Two best of seven legs singles matches followed by a best of seven doubles match. If necessary, one or two best of seven legs reverse singles matches are played to determine the champion.

England (1)	Scotland (2)	Score
Phil Taylor 113.43	Peter Wright 104.00	4–0
Adrian Lewis 96.43	Gary Anderson 103.14	1–4
Taylor & Lewis 103.20	Wright & Anderson 95.71	4–3
Phil Taylor 97.45	Gary Anderson 108.04	1–4
Adrian Lewis 103.15	Peter Wright 97.62	4–1
Final result		3–2
