= 2013 PDC World Cup of Darts =

Tournament information
- Dates: 1–3 February 2013
- Venue: Alsterdorfer Sporthalle
- Location: Hamburg
- Country: Germany
- Organisation(s): PDC
- Format: Legs
- Prize fund: £150,000
- Winner's share: £40,000
- High checkout: 167 (England) Phil Taylor (quarter-finals)

Champion(s)
- England (Phil Taylor and Adrian Lewis)

The 2013 PDC World Cup of Darts, known as the 2013 Betfair World Cup of Darts for sponsorship reasons, was the third edition of the PDC World Cup of Darts which took place between 1–3 February 2013 at the Alsterdorfer Sporthalle in Hamburg, Germany.

England's Phil Taylor and Adrian Lewis were the defending champions after defeating Australia's Simon Whitlock and Paul Nicholson in the 2012 final, and they retained their title by defeating the Belgian brothers Ronny and Kim Huybrechts 3–1 in the final.

== Format ==
24 countries in the PDC Order of Merit on 1 January after the 2013 PDC World Darts Championship were represented at the 2013 PDC World Cup of Darts. Each nation's top ranked player was joined by the second highest player of that country. For seeding the average rankings of the players was used, with the top eight seeds heading each of the eight groups of three countries.

The 24 countries were separated into eight groups of three. Each team played one best of nine leg match against the other two in their group. The top two from each group advanced to the last 16 where the tournament became a straight knockout bracket.

Group matches and Last 16: best of nine legs doubles.
Quarter-finals and semi-finals: 2 best of seven legs singles matches. Should the tie be 1–1, then a third and final doubles tie will be played.
Final: Up to the four best of seven legs singles matches. First team to 3 points wins the title. Should the tie be 2–2, then a fifth and final doubles tie will be played.

== Prize money ==
Prize money is per team:

| Position (no. of teams) | | Prize money (Total: £150,000) |
|---|---|---|
| Winners | (1) | £40,000 |
| Runners-Up | (1) | £20,000 |
| Semi-finalists | (2) | £13,000 |
| Quarter-finalists | (4) | £6,000 |
| Last 16 (second round) | (8) | £3,000 |
| Last 24 (group stage) | (8) | £2,000 |

== Teams and seeding ==
The 24 teams were divided into three pools based on their rankings, with one team from each pool assigned to each group.

On 25 January, it was announced that the Philippines team of Lourence Ilagan and Christian Perez had to withdraw from the event due to travel problems and were replaced by Italy.

Pool A (Seeded Nations)

| Rank | Country | Entered players |
|---|---|---|
| 1 | England | Phil Taylor and Adrian Lewis |
| 2 | Netherlands | Michael van Gerwen and Raymond van Barneveld |
| 3 | Australia | Simon Whitlock and Paul Nicholson |
| 4 | Scotland | Gary Anderson and Robert Thornton |
| 5 | Wales | Mark Webster and Richie Burnett |
| 6 | Northern Ireland | Brendan Dolan and Mickey Mansell |
| 7 | Germany | Jyhan Artut and Andree Welge |
| 8 | Ireland | William O'Connor and Connie Finnan |

Pool B

| Country | Entered players |
|---|---|
| Austria | Mensur Suljović and Maik Langendorf |
| Belgium | Kim Huybrechts and Ronny Huybrechts |
| Canada | John Part and Jeff Smith |
| Croatia | Robert Marijanović and Tonči Restović |
| Denmark | Per Laursen and Jann Hoffmann |
| Finland | Jani Haavisto and Jarkko Komula |
| Gibraltar | Dyson Parody and Dylan Duo |
| Spain | Antonio Alcinas and Carlos Rodriguez |

Pool C

| Country | Entered players |
|---|---|
| Hungary | Nándor Bezzeg and Zsolt Mészáros |
| Italy | Daniele Petri and Matteo Dal Monte |
| Japan | Haruki Muramatsu and Sho Katsumi |
| New Zealand | Phillip Hazel and Craig Caldwell |
| Poland | Krzysztof Kciuk and Krzysztof Ratajski |
| South Africa | Charl Pietersen and Shawn Hogan |
| Sweden | Magnus Caris and Par Riihonen |
| United States | Darin Young and Larry Butler |

== Results ==
=== Group stage ===
If teams were tied on number of wins, the tie-breakers were leg difference and then group stage average.

==== Group A ====
| Pos. | Team | P | W | L | LF | LA | +/- | Pts | Status |
|---|---|---|---|---|---|---|---|---|---|
| 1 | England (1) | 2 | 2 | 0 | 10 | 2 | +8 | 4 | Q |
| 2 | Japan | 2 | 1 | 1 | 5 | 9 | –4 | 2 | Q |
| 3 | Austria | 2 | 0 | 2 | 6 | 10 | –4 | 0 | Eliminated |

1 February

| 86.60 Austria | 4 – 5 | Japan 89.08 |
| 88.41 England | 5 – 0 | Japan 77.69 |

2 February

| 94.78 England | 5 – 2 | Austria 82.46 |

==== Group B ====
| Pos. | Team | P | W | L | LF | LA | +/- | Pts | Status |
|---|---|---|---|---|---|---|---|---|---|
| 1 | Ireland (8) | 2 | 1 | 1 | 9 | 5 | +4 | 2 | Q |
| 2 | South Africa | 2 | 1 | 1 | 9 | 9 | 0 | 2 | Q |
| 3 | Denmark | 2 | 1 | 1 | 5 | 9 | –4 | 2 | Eliminated |

1 February

| 66.34 Denmark | 5 – 4 | South Africa 70.51 |
| 90.54 Ireland | 5 – 0 | Denmark 74.74 |

2 February

| 84.33 Ireland | 4 – 5 | South Africa 81.80 |

==== Group C ====
| Pos. | Team | P | W | L | LF | LA | +/- | Pts | Status |
|---|---|---|---|---|---|---|---|---|---|
| 1 | Scotland (4) | 2 | 2 | 0 | 10 | 5 | +5 | 4 | Q |
| 2 | Canada | 2 | 1 | 1 | 8 | 9 | –1 | 2 | Q |
| 3 | Sweden | 2 | 0 | 2 | 6 | 10 | –4 | 0 | Eliminated |

1 February

| 91.15 Canada | 5 – 4 | Sweden 88.93 |
| 95.15 Scotland | 5 – 3 | Canada 95.45 |

2 February

| 82.40 Scotland | 5 – 2 | Sweden 82.98 |

==== Group D ====
| Pos. | Team | P | W | L | LF | LA | +/- | Pts | Status |
|---|---|---|---|---|---|---|---|---|---|
| 1 | Wales (5) | 2 | 2 | 0 | 10 | 2 | +8 | 4 | Q |
| 2 | Spain | 2 | 1 | 1 | 7 | 8 | –1 | 2 | Q |
| 3 | Italy | 2 | 0 | 2 | 3 | 10 | –1 | 0 | Eliminated |

1 February

| 81.68 Spain | 5 – 3 | Italy 84.66 |
| 76.61 Wales | 5 – 2 | Spain 74.28 |

2 February

| 82.58 Wales | 5 – 0 | Italy 79.00 |

==== Group E ====
| Pos. | Team | P | W | L | LF | LA | +/- | Pts | Status |
|---|---|---|---|---|---|---|---|---|---|
| 1 | Netherlands (2) | 2 | 2 | 0 | 10 | 3 | +7 | 4 | Q |
| 2 | Poland | 2 | 1 | 1 | 8 | 7 | +1 | 2 | Q |
| 3 | Gibraltar | 2 | 0 | 2 | 2 | 10 | –8 | 0 | Eliminated |

1 February

| 74.89 Gibraltar | 2 – 5 | Poland 70.36 |
| 91.61 Netherlands | 5 – 3 | Poland 83.04 |

2 February

| 85.40 Netherlands | 5 – 0 | Gibraltar 74.36 |

==== Group F ====
| Pos. | Team | P | W | L | LF | LA | +/- | Pts | Status |
|---|---|---|---|---|---|---|---|---|---|
| 1 | Germany (7) | 2 | 2 | 0 | 10 | 6 | +4 | 4 | Q |
| 2 | Finland | 2 | 1 | 1 | 8 | 9 | –1 | 2 | Q |
| 3 | United States | 2 | 0 | 2 | 7 | 10 | –3 | 0 | Eliminated |

1 February

| 85.55 Finland | 5 – 4 | United States 84.16 |
| 87.00 Germany | 5 – 3 | Finland 86.98 |

2 February

| 93.34 Germany | 5 – 3 | United States 89.07 |

==== Group G ====
| Pos. | Team | P | W | L | LF | LA | +/- | Pts | Status |
|---|---|---|---|---|---|---|---|---|---|
| 1 | Australia (3) | 2 | 2 | 0 | 10 | 3 | +7 | 4 | Q |
| 2 | Croatia | 2 | 1 | 1 | 6 | 5 | +1 | 2 | Q |
| 3 | New Zealand | 2 | 0 | 2 | 2 | 10 | –8 | 0 | Eliminated |

1 February

| 76.32 Croatia | 5 – 0 | New Zealand 77.66 |
| 84.88 Australia | 5 – 1 | Croatia 69.06 |

2 February

| 92.30 Australia | 5 – 2 | New Zealand 79.10 |

==== Group H ====
| Pos. | Team | P | W | L | LF | LA | +/- | Pts | Status |
|---|---|---|---|---|---|---|---|---|---|
| 1 | Northern Ireland (6) | 2 | 2 | 0 | 10 | 3 | +7 | 4 | Q |
| 2 | Belgium | 2 | 1 | 1 | 7 | 5 | +2 | 2 | Q |
| 3 | Hungary | 2 | 0 | 2 | 1 | 10 | –9 | 0 | Eliminated |

1 February

| 90.54 Belgium | 5 – 0 | Hungary 71.49 |
| 90.00 Northern Ireland | 5 – 2 | Belgium 89.44 |

2 February

| 76.05 Northern Ireland | 5 – 1 | Hungary 72.05 |

=== Knockout stage ===
Second round (best of 9 legs); 2 February
A1 | England (1) 91.27 | 5
B2 | South Africa 84.21 | 4
B1 | Ireland (8) 77.41 | 3
A2 | Japan 80.73 | 5
C1 | Scotland (4) 83.72 | 4
D2 | Spain 87.23 | 5
D1 | Wales (5) 98.24 | 5
C2 | Canada 95.01 | 2
E1 | Netherlands (2) 97.38 | 3
F2 | Finland 96.00 | 5
F1 | Germany (7) 81.37 | 5
E2 | Poland 72.80 | 2
G1 | Australia (3) 95.57 | 1
H2 | Belgium 101.08 | 5
H1 | Northern Ireland (6) 83.58 | 4
G2 | Croatia 76.91 | 5

Quarter-finals (best of 3 matches); 3 February
A1 | England (1) | 4 | 3 | 4 | 2
A2 | Japan | 1 | 4 | 2 | 1
D2 | Spain | 3 | 4 | 2 | 1
D1 | Wales (5) | 4 | 3 | 4 | 2
F2 | Finland | 1 | 4 | 4 | 2
F1 | Germany (7) | 4 | 2 | 3 | 1
H2 | Belgium | 4 | 4 | 2
G2 | Croatia | 2 | 1 | 0

Semi-finals (best of 3 matches); 3 February
A1 | England (1) | 4 | 3 | 4 | 2
D1 | Wales (5) | 1 | 4 | 3 | 1
F2 | Finland | 1 | 4 | 0 | 1
H2 | Belgium | 4 | 3 | 4 | 2

Final (best of 5 matches); 3 February
A1 | England (1) | 4 | 0 | 4 | 4 | 3
H2 | Belgium | 0 | 4 | 2 | 1 | 1

=== Quarter-finals ===
Two best of seven legs singles matches. If the scores were tied, a best of seven legs doubles match settled the match.

| England (1) | Japan | Score |
|---|---|---|
| Phil Taylor 107.82 | Haruki Muramatsu 100.05 | 4–1 |
| Adrian Lewis 85.98 | Sho Katsumi 81.18 | 3–4 |
| Taylor & Lewis 99.60 | Muramatsu & Katsumi 89.28 | 4–2 |
| Final result | | 2–1 |

| Spain | Wales (5) | Score |
|---|---|---|
| Antonio Alcinas 85.68 | Mark Webster 88.29 | 3–4 |
| Carlos Rodríguez 84.27 | Richie Burnett 80.61 | 4–3 |
| Alcinas & Rodríguez 82.53 | Webster & Burnett 86.79 | 2–4 |
| Final result | | 1–2 |

| Finland | Germany (7) | Score |
|---|---|---|
| Jani Haavisto 92.07 | Jyhan Artut 93.36 | 1–4 |
| Jarkko Komula 78.48 | Andree Welge 83.55 | 4–2 |
| Haavisto & Komula 79.44 | Artut & Welge 73.86 | 4–3 |
| Final result | | 2–1 |

| Belgium | Croatia | Score |
|---|---|---|
| Kim Huybrechts 93.69 | Tonči Restović 84.42 | 4–2 |
| Ronny Huybrechts 80.64 | Robert Marijanović 77.16 | 4–1 |
| Final result | | 2–0 |

=== Semi-finals ===
Two best of seven legs singles matches. If the scores were tied, a best of seven legs doubles match settled the match.

| England (1) | Wales (5) | Score |
|---|---|---|
| Phil Taylor 101.97 | Mark Webster 93.66 | 4–1 |
| Adrian Lewis 90.66 | Richie Burnett 89.19 | 3–4 |
| Taylor & Lewis 94.62 | Webster & Burnett 93.33 | 4–3 |
| Final result | | 2–1 |

| Finland | Belgium | Score |
|---|---|---|
| Jani Haavisto 81.66 | Kim Huybrechts 98.75 | 1–4 |
| Jarkko Komula 90.03 | Ronny Huybrechts 84.90 | 4–3 |
| Haavisto & Komula 86.22 | K. Huybrechts & R. Huybrechts 105.48 | 0–4 |
| Final result | | 1–2 |

=== Final ===
Three match wins were needed to win the title. Two best of seven legs singles matches were played, followed by reverse singles matches. If the score had been level after that, a best of seven legs doubles match would have been played to determine the champion.

| England (1) | Belgium | Score |
|---|---|---|
| Phil Taylor 101.91 | Ronny Huybrechts 83.25 | 4–0 |
| Adrian Lewis 85.17 | Kim Huybrechts 100.20 | 0–4 |
| Adrian Lewis 105.75 | Ronny Huybrechts 92.13 | 4–2 |
| Phil Taylor 98.91 | Kim Huybrechts 93.03 | 4–1 |
| Final result | | 3–1 |

== Television coverage ==
The tournament was broadcast by Sky Sports in the UK and Ireland, RTL 7 in the Netherlands and Fox Sports in Australia.
