= Aleksei Kadochnikov =

Russian darts player

Personal information
- Nickname: "The Beard"
- Born: 31 December 1985 (age 40) Tver, Russia
- Home town: Tver, Russia

Sport
- Sport: Darts
- Playing since: 2005
- Darts: 24 Gram Unicorn Signature
- Laterality: Right-handed
- Walk-on music: "Play That Funky Music" by Wild Cherry

Organisation (see split in darts)
- PDC: 2009–
- WDF: 2021–

Other tournament wins
- Years
EADC Pro Tour	2015, 2018 (x3), 2019 (x2), 2020, 2021
Hungarian Masters	2021
Saint Petersburg Open	2021
Udmurtia Open	2019, 2022
Kalashnikov Cup	2022

Aleksei Kadochnikov (born 31 December 1985) is a Russian professional darts player who plays in Professional Darts Corporation (PDC) events.

== Career ==
In 2015, he made his television debut in the 2015 PDC World Cup of Darts, partnering Boris Koltsov, but they lost in the first round to Simon Whitlock and Paul Nicholson of Australia. In 2019, he returned to the World Cup with partner Koltsov again, losing to Austria in the first round in a high quality match.

In 2015, 2018 and 2019, he won a combined total of 6 events on the EADC Pro Tour.
