= Tamás Alexits =

Hungarian darts player (born 1994)

Personal information
- Born: January 5, 1994 (age 32) Sopron, Hungary
- Home town: Harka, Hungary

Sport
- Sport: Darts
- Laterality: Right-handed

Organisation (see split in darts)
- PDC: 2017–

Tamás Alexits (born 5 January 1994) is a Hungarian professional darts player who plays in Professional Darts Corporation events. He made his PDC European Tour debut in the 2018 Austrian Darts Open, but was defeated 6–1 by Jason Cullen.

He also represented Hungary in the 2018 PDC World Cup of Darts along with Nándor Bezzeg, but they lost 5–3 in the first round to the South African pairing of Devon Petersen and Liam O'Brien.
