= 2018 PDC World Cup of Darts =

Tournament information
- Dates: 31 May–3 June 2018
- Venue: Eissporthalle
- Location: Frankfurt
- Country: Germany
- Organisation(s): PDC
- Format: Legs
- Prize fund: £300,000
- Winner's share: £60,000
- High checkout: 170 (Australia) Kyle Anderson (second round)

Champion(s)
- Netherlands (Michael van Gerwen and Raymond van Barneveld)

The 2018 PDC World Cup of Darts, known as the 2018 Betway World Cup of Darts for sponsorship reasons, was the eighth edition of the PDC World Cup of Darts. It took place between 31 May–3 June 2018 in at the Eissporthalle in Frankfurt, Germany.

The Netherlands pairing of Michael van Gerwen and Raymond van Barneveld were the reigning champions and they retained the title by defeating Scotland's Peter Wright and Gary Anderson 3–1 in the final.

== Format ==
The tournament will remain at 32 teams this year, with the top 8 teams being seeded and the remaining 24 teams being unseeded in the first round. Like last year, there are no groups in 2018 with the tournament being a straight knockout.

First round: Best of nine legs doubles.
Second round, quarter and semi-finals: Two best of seven legs singles matches. If the scores are tied a best of seven legs doubles match will settle the match.
Final: Three points needed to win the title. Two best of seven legs singles matches are played followed by a best of seven doubles match. If necessary, one or two best of seven legs singles matches in reverse order are played to determine the champion.

== Prize money ==
Total prize money remained at £300,000, like last year. The prize money will be per team:

Position (no. of teams)		Prize money (Total: £300,000)
Winners	(1)	£60,000
Runners-Up	(1)	£32,000
Semi-finalists	(2)	£20,000
Quarter-finalists	(4)	£14,000
Last 16 (second round)	(8)	£8,000
Last 32 (first round)	(16)	£3,000

== Teams and seedings ==
The Top 8 nations based on combined Order of Merit rankings on 14 May were seeded.

Seeded nations

Rank	Country	Entered players
1	Scotland	Peter Wright and Gary Anderson
2	England	Rob Cross and Dave Chisnall
3	Netherlands	Michael van Gerwen and Raymond van Barneveld
4	Australia	Simon Whitlock and Kyle Anderson
5	Wales	Gerwyn Price and Jonny Clayton
6	Northern Ireland	Daryl Gurney and Brendan Dolan
7	Belgium	Kim Huybrechts and Dimitri Van den Bergh
8	Austria	Mensur Suljović and Zoran Lerchbacher

Unseeded nations (in alphabetical order)

Country	Entered players
Brazil	Diogo Portela and Bruno Rangel
Canada	John Part and Dawson Murschell
China	Momo Zhou and Zong Xiao Chen
Czech Republic	Karel Sedláček and Roman Benecký
Denmark	Per Laursen and Henrik Primdal
Finland	Marko Kantele and Kim Viljanen
Germany	Max Hopp and Martin Schindler
Gibraltar	Dyson Parody and Justin Broton
Greece	John Michael and Veniamin Symeonidis
Hong Kong	Royden Lam and Ho-Yin Shek
Hungary	Tamás Alexits and Nándor Bezzeg
Ireland	William O'Connor and Steve Lennon
Italy	Michel Furlani and Alessio Medaina
Japan	Seigo Asada and Haruki Muramatsu
New Zealand	Cody Harris and Warren Parry
Poland	Krzysztof Ratajski and Tytus Kanik
Russia	Boris Koltsov and Aleksandr Oreshkin
Singapore	Paul Lim and Harith Lim
South Africa	Devon Petersen and Liam O'Brien
Spain	Cristo Reyes and Toni Alcinas
Sweden	Daniel Larsson and Dennis Nilsson
Switzerland	Alex Fehlmann and Andy Bless
Thailand	Thanawat Gaweenuntawong and Attapol Eupakaree
United States	Larry Butler and Darin Young

== Results ==
=== Draw ===
First round (best of 9 legs); 31 May – 1 June
1	Scotland 94.66	5
United States 84.25	1
Denmark 65.58	1
Brazil 70.90	5
8	Austria 88.68	4
Japan 92.74	5
Italy 71.16	1
Canada 74.03	5
5	Wales 85.73	5
Thailand 79.89	3
Switzerland 67.58	5
China 70.34	2
4	Australia 93.88	5
Hong Kong 83.32	1
Russia 75.61	4
Spain 85.11	5
2	England 93.27	5
Czech Republic 78.19	3
New Zealand 78.50	3
Singapore 86.12	5
7	Belgium 86.78	5
Ireland 87.37	4
Greece 79.74	1
Finland 84.80	5
6	Northern Ireland 83.26	5
Poland 86.00	4
Sweden 79.94	3
Germany 90.83	5
3	Netherlands 102.95	5
Gibraltar 66.38	0
Hungary 69.40	3
South Africa 74.33	5

Second round (best of 3 matches); 2 June
1	Scotland 91.97	4	4	2
Brazil 75.37	1	0	0
Japan 88.12	4	4	2
Canada 79.16	3	0	0
5	Wales 85.83	3	4	4	2
Switzerland 81.25	4	0	1	1
4	Australia 89.30	2	4	4	2
Spain 84.04	4	1	3	1
2	England 91.92	2	4	4	2
Singapore 90.62	4	2	1	1
7	Belgium 94.50	4	4	2
Finland 81.97	0	1	0
6	Northern Ireland 88.70	4	3	2	1
Germany 87.86	0	4	4	2
3	Netherlands 96.20	4	4	2
South Africa 82.38	0	0	0

Quarter-finals (best of 3 matches); 3 June
1	Scotland 96.25	4	4	2
Japan 91.80	0	0	0
5	Wales 87.38	2	4	1	1
4	Australia 90.53	4	0	4	2
2	England 94.26	4	3	0	1
7	Belgium 96.74	2	4	4	2
Germany 99.97	1	0	0
3	Netherlands 101.38	4	4	2

Semi-finals (best of 3 matches); 3 June
1	Scotland 95.85	4	3	4	2
4	Australia 94.93	3	4	3	1
7	Belgium 102.60	2	2	0
3	Netherlands 109.58	4	4	2

Final (best of 5 matches); 3 June
1	Scotland 97.76	2	4	1	0	1
3	Netherlands 97.75	4	1	4	4	3

=== Second round ===
Two best of seven legs singles matches. If the scores were tied, a best of seven legs doubles match settled the match.

Scotland (1)	Brazil	Score
Peter Wright 94.82	Diogo Portela 82.14	4–1
Gary Anderson 88.41	Bruno Rangel 66.91	4–0
Final result		2–0

Japan	Canada	Score
Seigo Asada 88.69	John Part 77.67	4–3
Haruki Muramatsu 87.13	Dawson Murschell 80.64	4–0
Final result		2–0

Wales (5)	Switzerland	Score
Gerwyn Price 90.63	Alex Fehlmann 89.56	3–4
Jonny Clayton 82.36	Andy Bless 77.78	4–0
Price & Clayton 81.88	Fehlmann & Bless 72.40	4–1
Final result		2–1

Australia (4)	Spain	Score
Simon Whitlock 86.47	Cristo Reyes 85.41	2–4
Kyle Anderson 88.13	Toni Alcinas 76.98	4–1
Whitlock & Anderson 92.56	Reyes & Alcinas 87.92	4–3
Final result		2–1

England (2)	Singapore	Score
Rob Cross 103.50	Paul Lim 102.29	2–4
Dave Chisnall 89.87	Harith Lim 89.67	4–2
Cross & Chisnall 80.71	P. Lim & H. Lim 77.77	4–1
Final result		2–1

Belgium (7)	Finland	Score
Kim Huybrechts 87.13	Marko Kantele 75.91	4–0
Dimitri Van den Bergh 100.40	Kim Viljanen 86.81	4–1
Final result		2–0

Northern Ireland (6)	Germany	Score
Daryl Gurney 92.49	Martin Schindler 85.67	4–0
Brendan Dolan 92.67	Max Hopp 90.68	3–4
Gurney & Dolan 80.94	Schindler & Hopp 86.04	2–4
Final result		1–2

Netherlands (3)	South Africa	Score
Michael van Gerwen 95.43	Liam O'Brien 82.81	4–0
Raymond van Barneveld 96.97	Devon Petersen 81.95	4–0
Final result		2–0

=== Quarter-finals ===
Two best of seven legs singles matches. If the scores were tied, a best of seven legs doubles match will settle the match.

Scotland (1)	Japan	Score
Peter Wright 93.94	Seigo Asada 92.75	4–0
Gary Anderson 98.56	Haruki Muramatsu 90.84	4–0
Final result		2–0

Wales (5)	Australia (4)	Score
Gerwyn Price 89.35	Simon Whitlock 100.85	2–4
Jonny Clayton 83.50	Kyle Anderson 77.26	4–0
Price & Clayton 88.13	Whitlock & Anderson 88.75	1–4
Final result		1–2

England (2)	Belgium (7)	Score
Rob Cross 107.48	Kim Huybrechts 98.78	4–2
Dave Chisnall 86.86	Dimitri Van den Bergh 91.25	3–4
Cross & Chisnall 87.40	Huybrechts & Van den Bergh 100.20	0–4
Final result		1–2

Germany	Netherlands (3)	Score
Martin Schindler 110.00	Michael van Gerwen 109.61	1–4
Max Hopp 87.43	Raymond van Barneveld 91.09	0–4
Final result		0–2

=== Semi-finals ===
Two best of seven legs singles matches. If the scores were tied, a best of seven legs doubles match will settle the match.

Scotland (1)	Australia (4)	Score
Peter Wright 103.42	Simon Whitlock 100.77	4–3
Gary Anderson 90.91	Kyle Anderson 95.10	3–4
Wright & Anderson 93.23	Whitlock & Anderson 88.91	4–3
Final result		2–1

Belgium (7)	Netherlands (3)	Score
Kim Huybrechts 97.65	Michael van Gerwen 105.78	2–4
Dimitri Van den Bergh 107.54	Raymond van Barneveld 113.38	2–4
Final result		0–2

=== Final ===
Three match wins were needed to win the title. Two best of seven legs singles matches followed by a best of seven doubles match. If necessary, one or two best of seven legs reverse singles matches are played to determine the champion.

Scotland (1)	Netherlands (3)	Score
Peter Wright 96.79	Michael van Gerwen 97.20	2–4
Gary Anderson 97.21	Raymond van Barneveld 84.60	4–1
Wright & Anderson 98.45	van Gerwen & van Barneveld 100.69	1–4
Gary Anderson 99.06	Michael van Gerwen 111.33	0–4
Final result		1–3
