= Pál Székely =

Hungarian darts player

Personal information
- Nickname: "The Blade"
- Born: November 14, 1972 (age 53) Budapest, Hungarian People's Republic
- Home town: Szigetszentmiklós, Hungary

Sport
- Sport: Darts
- Playing since: 1993
- Darts: 23 Gram Target Signature
- Laterality: Right-handed
- Walk-on music: "Born to Be Wild" by Steppenwolf

Organisation (see split in darts)
- BDO: 2007–2019
- PDC: 2019–

WDF major events – best performances
- World Masters: Last 144: 2012

Pál Székely (born 14 November 1972) is a Hungarian darts player, four-time Hungarian steel darts champion and the first professional darts player from Hungary. Székely is nicknamed "The Blade".

In 2019, he made his PDC European Tour debut in the 2019 Dutch Darts Masters, but lost 6–1 to Raymond van Barneveld. A few weeks later, Székely made his television debut at the 2019 PDC World Cup of Darts, partnering János Végső.
