= Michal Kočík =

Czech darts player

Personal information
- Nickname: "Kočátor"
- Born: 14 March 1979 (age 47) Brno, Czechoslovakia
- Home town: Brno, Czech Republic

Sport
- Sport: Darts
- Playing since: 1997
- Darts: 23g Unicorn
- Laterality: Right-handed
- Walk-on music: "Svaz českých bohémů" by Wohnout

Organisation (see split in darts)
- BDO: 2011–2012
- PDC: 2013–2019
- WDF: 2011–2012

WDF major events – best performances
- World Masters: Last 64: 2011, 2012

Other tournament wins
- Years
Austrian Open	2011
Czech Ch'ship	2011
Czech Ch'ship (soft-tip)	2010, 2011

Michal Kočík (born 14 March 1979) is a Czech professional soft-tip and steel-tip darts player who played in World Darts Federation (WDF), Professional Darts Corporation (PDC) and soft-tip international events. He has represented his country two times at the PDC World Cup of Darts. He was a three-time Czech Darts Champion.

== Career ==
He got into darts for the first time in 1997, when a friend took him to a pub where darts were played. Michal was so fascinated by this sport that within 14 days he had his own target at home. And he started throwing regularly. As he was studying at the time, he said he had plenty of time to training. Kočík spent 10 years played at the soft-tip competitions. In 2009, he advanced to the final at the Czech Championship at soft-tip dartboards. A year later, he already won the same championship and finished at third place in the steel-tip singles competition.

2011 was clearly the most successful year in Kočík's career. He won both national championships (soft-tip and steel-tip) and also reigned supreme in the overall ranking of the Czech Cup. His form and growing confidence as a player was also reflected in foreign World Darts Federation tournaments. He advanced to the semi-finals in the Polish Open and he won the Austrian Open, defeated Boris Krcmar in the final match by 2–0 in sets. Winning this tournament guaranteed him entry into the 2011 Winmau World Masters. He advanced to the third round by defeated Jerry Hendriks and Glen Rosberg on his way. In the third round, he lost to Christian Kist by 0–3 in sets. A year later, at the 2012 Winmau World Masters, he repeated this result. However, it was his last participation in these tournament.

In 2013, he played again in the Polish Open, where he managed to defeated Tony O'Shea and Darryl Fitton. Finally, he end this tournament at the quarter-finals, where he lost to Jeffrey de Graaf. In 2015, he was invited to participate in the 2015 PDC World Cup of Darts as a Czech Republic representative together with Pavel Jirkal. They lost in the first round match against Mensur Suljović and Rowby-John Rodriguez from Austria by 2–5 in legs. He got another chance to play in the Professional Darts Corporation tournament during 2016 PDC World Cup of Darts. This time he represented his country together with Pavel Drtíl. They ended their participation in the first round, lost to Yuanjun Liu and Wenge Xie from China, by 3–5 in legs.

== Performance timeline ==
Tournament	2011	2012	2013	2014	2015	2016
WDF Ranked televised events
World Masters	3R	3R	DNQ			
PDC Non-ranked televised events
World Cup of Darts	NH	DNQ			1R	1R
