= Haruki Muramatsu =

Japanese darts player (born 1977)

Haruki Muramatsu 村松 治樹
Personal information
- Nickname: "Rising Sun"
- Born: April 15, 1977 (age 49) Iwate Prefecture, Japan

Sport
- Sport: Darts
- Playing since: 2002
- Darts: 22g Target Signature
- Laterality: Right-handed
- Walk-on music: "Boom Shake the Room" by DJ Jazzy Jeff & The Fresh Prince

Organisation (see split in darts)
- PDC: 2009–
- WDF: 2023–

WDF major events – best performances
- World Championship: Last 32: 2025

PDC premier events – best performances
- World Championship: Last 64: 2010, 2012, 2013
- Grand Slam: Group Stage: 2023

Other tournament wins
- Years
Soft Tip Dartslive France	2014
PDC Asian Championship	2023
PDC Asian Tour	2019, 2023, 2024, 2026 (×4)

Haruki Muramatsu (村松 治樹, Muramatsu Haruki; born 15 April 1977) is a Japanese darts player who competes in both Professional Darts Corporation (PDC) and World Darts Federation (WDF) events. He won the 2023 PDC Asian Championship.

== Career ==
Muramatsu qualified for the 2010 PDC World Darts Championship. He defeated Poland's Krzysztof Kciuk 4–1 in the preliminary round, but lost 3–0 to Ronnie Baxter in the first round.

He qualified for his second PDC World Championship in 2012, where he beat Dennis Nilsson 4–2 in legs in the preliminary round to set up a last 64 meeting with 15-time world champion, Phil Taylor. He was beaten 0-3 but did manage to win three legs during the match, including breaking Taylor's throw twice. Taylor said after the match that Muramatsu would have "frightened any pro" with the level of his performance during the match. He moved to 94 in the PDC Order of Merit after the Championship. Muramatsu represented Japan with Morihiro Hashimoto in the 2012 PDC World Cup of Darts and together they were beaten 2–5 by Sweden in the first round.

Muramatsu qualified for his third PDC World Championship, and second in succession, in 2013 by winning the Japan Qualifying Event. He played Dave Harrington of New Zealand in the preliminary round, winning 4–0 to set up a first round match against Simon Whitlock which he lost 3–0. He played in his third World Cup of Darts and first with Sho Katsumi in February and they advanced from Group A thanks to a 5–4 win over Austria. They then defeated the Republic of Ireland 5–3 to face the top seeds of Phil Taylor and Adrian Lewis in the quarter-finals. Muramatsu lost to Taylor 4–1, but Katsumi defeated Lewis meaning that a doubles match was required to settle the tie. Japan led 2–0 but went on to lose 4–2. He was edged out 6–5 by Hashimoto in the final of the Japanese qualifier for the 2014 World Championship.

In June 2014, Muramatsu and Hashimoto watched as Canada missed seven darts for the match in the first round of the World Cup of Darts to step in and steal a 5–4 win. In the second round they both lost their singles matches against the Northern Irish partnering of Brendan Dolan and Michael Mansell to exit the tournament. A week later he won the French Soft Tip Darts Live event by beating Shaun Narain in the final.

Muramatsu qualified for the 2015 World Championship by defeating Masumi Chino 6–5 in the Japanese Qualifier. He lost to Boris Koltsov 4–2 in the preliminary round. Muramatsu entered PDC Qualifying School and was knocked out in the last 16 on two of four days which helped him finish inside the top 18 on the Order of Merit who earn two-year PDC tour cards. After whitewashing China 5–0, Muramatsu and Hashimoto were knocked out of the World Cup in the second round for the second year in a row this time to the top seeds England. Muramatsu competed in the inaugural Japan Darts Masters and was eliminated 6–1 by Peter Wright in the opening round.

Muramatsu played in nine Players Championship events in 2016, but did not win a match in any of them. He was knocked out in the semi-finals of the Japan Open. He partnered Keita Ono at the World Cup for the first time and they lost 5–2 to Northern Ireland in the opening round. Muramatsu was eliminated at the same stage a year later with new partner Yuki Yamada after losing 5–3 to Spain.

In October 2023, Murumatsu won the PDC Asian Championship. This win qualified him for the World Championship.

== World Championship results ==
=== PDC ===
- 2010: First round (lost to Ronnie Baxter 0–3)
- 2012: First round (lost to Phil Taylor 0–3)
- 2013: First round (lost to Simon Whitlock 0–3)
- 2015: Preliminary round (lost to Boris Koltsov 2–4 in legs)
- 2024: First round (lost to Scott Williams 1–3)

=== WDF ===
- 2025: Second round (lost to Matt Clark 1–3)
