= 2017 PDC World Cup of Darts =

Tournament information
- Dates: 1–4 June 2017
- Venue: Eissporthalle
- Location: Frankfurt
- Country: Germany
- Organisation(s): PDC
- Format: Legs
- Prize fund: £300,000
- Winner's share: £60,000
- High checkout: 170 (Austria) Mensur Suljović (quarter-finals)

Champion(s)
- Netherlands (Michael van Gerwen and Raymond van Barneveld)

The 2017 PDC World Cup of Darts, known as the 2017 Betway World Cup of Darts for sponsorship reasons, was the seventh edition of the PDC World Cup of Darts. It took place between 1–4 June 2017 at the Eissporthalle in Frankfurt, Germany.

The England pairing of Phil Taylor and Adrian Lewis were the reigning champions, after beating the Netherlands' Michael van Gerwen and Raymond van Barneveld 3–2 in the 2016 final. England were represented by Lewis and Dave Chisnall. However, they lost 2–0 to the Netherlands in the semi-finals.

The Netherlands went on to win their third title after beating Wales, represented by Gerwyn Price and Mark Webster, in the final 3–1.

== Format ==
The tournament remained at 32 teams this year, with the top 8 teams are seeded and the remaining 24 teams being unseeded in the first round. Like last year, there are no groups in 2017 with the tournament being a straight knockout.

First round: Best of nine legs doubles.
Second round, quarter and semi-finals: Two best of seven legs singles matches. If the scores are tied a best of seven legs doubles match will settle the match.
Final: Three points needed to win the title. Two best of seven legs singles matches are played followed by a best of seven doubles match. If necessary, one or two best of seven legs singles matches in reverse order are played to determine the champion.

== Prize money ==
Total prize money was increased by £50,000 from last year's tournament, to a total of £300,000.

The prize money will be per team:

Position (no. of teams)		Prize money (Total: £300,000)
Winners	(1)	£60,000
Runners-Up	(1)	£32,000
Semi-finalists	(2)	£20,000
Quarter-finalists	(4)	£14,000
Last 16 (second round)	(8)	£8,000
Last 32 (first round)	(16)	£3,000

== Teams and seeding ==
The list of teams was announced on 19 April 2017, with the seeds announced on 22 May. Brazil and Latvia were due to make their debuts, with Norway and the Philippines missing from last year's tournament, but on the day of the announcement of all the teams, Latvia (who were to be represented by Madars Razma and Nauris Gleglu) withdrew and were replaced with another debutant in Switzerland. Final confirmation of all teams came on 22 May 2017.

Seeded nations

Rank	Country	Entered players
1	Scotland	Gary Anderson and Peter Wright
2	England	Adrian Lewis and Dave Chisnall
3	Netherlands	Michael van Gerwen and Raymond van Barneveld
4	Wales	Gerwyn Price and Mark Webster
5	Australia	Simon Whitlock and Kyle Anderson
6	Northern Ireland	Daryl Gurney and Brendan Dolan
7	Austria	Mensur Suljović and Rowby-John Rodriguez
8	Belgium	Kim Huybrechts and Ronny Huybrechts

Unseeded nations (in alphabetical order)

Country	Entered players
Brazil	Diogo Portela and Alexandre Sattin
Canada	John Part and John Norman Jnr
China	Weihong Li and Yuanjun Liu
Czech Republic	Karel Sedláček and František Humpula
Denmark	Per Laursen and Alex Jensen
Finland	Kim Viljanen and Marko Kantele
Germany	Max Hopp and Martin Schindler
Gibraltar	Dyson Parody and Dylan Duo
Greece	John Michael and Ioannis Selachoglou
Hong Kong	Royden Lam and Kai Fan Leung
Hungary	Zoltán Mester and János Végső
Ireland	Mick McGowan and William O'Connor
Italy	Daniele Petri and Gabriel Rollo
Japan	Haruki Muramatsu and Yuki Yamada
New Zealand	Cody Harris and Rob Szabo
Poland	Krzysztof Ratajski and Tytus Kanik
Russia	Boris Koltsov and Aleksandr Oreshkin
Singapore	Paul Lim and Harith Lim
South Africa	Devon Petersen and Deon Oliver
Spain	Cristo Reyes and Antonio Alcinas
Sweden	Magnus Caris and Daniel Larsson
Switzerland	Patrick Rey and Philipp Ruckstuhl
Thailand	Thanawat Yong and Attapol Eupakaree
United States	Darin Young and Larry Butler

== Results ==
=== Draw ===
First round (best of 9 legs); 1–2 June
1	Scotland 84.20	2
Singapore 85.25	5
Japan 78.49	3
Spain 75.56	5
8	Belgium 86.87	5
New Zealand 72.23	2
Thailand 72.50	3
Greece 71.50	5
5	Australia 81.10	5
Denmark 81.38	4
Hong Kong 81.82	3
Russia 81.36	5
4	Wales 100.14	5
Finland 92.74	4
Ireland 92.93	5
Poland 86.90	3
2	England 75.98	5
Gibraltar 66.49	2
South Africa 76.67	5
Sweden 81.85	3
7	Austria 90.54	5
China 76.92	0
Hungary 69.92	2
Canada 72.65	5
6	Northern Ireland 79.35	4
Germany 80.98	5
Brazil 72.10	5
Switzerland 70.06	4
3	Netherlands 109.33	5
Czech Republic 88.23	1
United States 84.61	5
Italy 82.48	1

Second round (best of 3 matches); 3 June
Singapore 84.06	4	1	4	2
Spain 84.21	1	4	0	1
8	Belgium 102.13	4	4	2
Greece 85.68	2	0	0
5	Australia 88.19	1	4	0	1
Russia 91.54	4	1	4	2
4	Wales 84.81	4	4	2
Ireland 86.96	3	3	0
2	England 88.43	4	4	2
South Africa 77.21	0	0	0
7	Austria 85.23	4	4	2
Canada 74.87	0	2	0
Germany 85.95	4	4	2
Brazil 69.36	0	1	0
3	Netherlands 101.18	4	2	4	2
United States 89.48	2	4	0	1

Quarter-finals (best of 3 matches); 4 June
Singapore 88.96	1	4	2	1
8	Belgium 98.94	4	2	4	2
Russia 81.96	1	0	0
4	Wales 88.59	4	4	2
2	England 92.98	0	4	4	2
7	Austria 95.02	4	1	2	1
Germany 92.71	2	4	1	1
3	Netherlands 97.83	4	3	4	2

Semi-finals (best of 3 matches); 4 June
8	Belgium 88.78	2	2	0
4	Wales 98.47	4	4	2
2	England 97.08	3	2	0
3	Netherlands 99.75	4	4	2

Final (best of 5 matches); 4 June
4	Wales 92.78	0	4	1	2	1
3	Netherlands 98.13	4	1	4	4	3

=== Second round ===
Two best of seven legs singles matches. If the scores were tied, a best of seven legs doubles match will settle the match.

Singapore	Spain	Score
Paul Lim 87.13	Antonio Alcinas 79.86	4–0
Harith Lim 73.97	Cristo Reyes 85.26	1–4
P. Lim & H. Lim 91.09	Reyes & Alcinas 87.24	4–0
Final result		2–1

Belgium (8)	Greece	Score
Kim Huybrechts 88.63	Ioannis Selachoglou 82.41	4–2
Ronny Huybrechts 115.62	John Michael 88.94	4–0
Final result		2–0

Australia (5)	Russia	Score
Kyle Anderson 88.91	Aleksandr Oreshkin 93.41	2–4
Simon Whitlock 87.12	Boris Koltsov 87.27	4–1
Anderson & Whitlock 88.45	Oreshkin & Koltsov 93.94	0–4
Final result		1–2

Wales (4)	Ireland	Score
Gerwyn Price 83.83	Mick McGowan 82.56	4–3
Mark Webster 85.78	William O'Connor 91.35	4–3
Final result		2–0

England (2)	South Africa	Score
Adrian Lewis 87.13	Devon Petersen 75.64	4–0
Dave Chisnall 89.73	Deon Oliver 78.77	4–0
Final result		2–0

Austria (7)	Canada	Score
Mensur Suljović 89.73	John Part 72.09	4–0
Rowby-John Rodriguez 80.78	John Norman Jnr 76.72	4–2
Final result		2–0

Germany	Brazil	Score
Martin Schindler 77.08	Alexandre Sattin 62.00	4–0
Max Hopp 93.04	Diogo Portela 75.24	4–1
Final result		2–0

Netherlands (3)	United States	Score
Michael van Gerwen 93.87	Darin Young 90.35	4–2
Raymond van Barneveld 98.34	Larry Butler 91.04	2–4
Van Gerwen & Van Barneveld 111.33	Young & Butler 85.82	4–0
Final result		2–1

=== Quarter-finals ===
Two best of seven legs singles matches. If the scores were tied, a best of seven legs doubles match will settle the match.

Singapore	Belgium (8)	Score
Paul Lim 100.40	Kim Huybrechts 121.97	1–4
Harith Lim 79.25	Ronny Huybrechts 76.18	4–2
P. Lim & H. Lim 87.24	K. Huybrechts & R. Huybrechts 98.66	2–4
Final result		1–2

Russia	Wales (4)	Score
Aleksandr Oreshkin 77.97	Gerwyn Price 80.21	1–4
Boris Koltsov 85.95	Mark Webster 96.97	0–4
Final result		0–2

England (2)	Austria (7)	Score
Adrian Lewis 82.79	Mensur Suljović 101.90	0–4
Dave Chisnall 99.08	Rowby-John Rodriguez 91.01	4–1
Lewis & Chisnall 94.70	Suljović & Rodriguez 92.15	4–2
Final result		2–1

Germany	Netherlands (3)	Score
Martin Schindler 93.34	Michael van Gerwen 97.31	2–4
Max Hopp 88.62	Raymond van Barneveld 91.00	4–3
Schindler & Hopp 96.17	Van Gerwen & Van Barneveld 105.17	1–4
Final result		1–2

=== Semi-finals ===
Two best of seven legs singles matches. If the scores were tied, a best of seven legs doubles match will settle the match.

Belgium (8)	Wales (4)	Score
Kim Huybrechts 95.89	Gerwyn Price 101.04	2–4
Ronny Huybrechts 81.67	Mark Webster 95.90	2–4
Final result		0–2

England (2)	Netherlands (3)	Score
Adrian Lewis 99.24	Michael van Gerwen 99.35	3–4
Dave Chisnall 94.57	Raymond van Barneveld 100.14	2–4
Final result		0–2

=== Final ===
Three match wins were needed to win the title. Two best of seven legs singles matches followed by a best of seven doubles match. If necessary, one or two best of seven legs reverse singles matches are played to determine the champion.

Wales (4)	Netherlands (3)	Score
Gerwyn Price 87.74	Michael van Gerwen 98.56	0–4
Mark Webster 93.40	Raymond van Barneveld 98.45	4–1
Price & Webster 92.39	Van Gerwen & Van Barneveld 93.96	1–4
Gerwyn Price 95.96	Raymond van Barneveld 101.06	2–4
Final result		1–3
