= Attapol Eupakaree =

Thai darts player (born 1973)

Personal information
- Full name: Attapol Eupakaree
- Nickname: "Poppy"
- Born: 12 February 1973 (age 53) Bangkok, Thailand
- Home town: Bangkok, Thailand

Sport
- Sport: Darts
- Darts: 18g Hinotori
- Laterality: Right-handed

Organisation (see split in darts)
- BDO: 2013, 2019
- PDC: 2015–
- WDF: 2013, 2019

Other tournament wins
- Years
Malaysian Open	2013

Attapol Eupakaree (born 12 February 1973) is a Thai professional darts player who plays in World Darts Federation (WDF) and Professional Darts Corporation (PDC) events. He has represented Thailand at the PDC World Cup of Darts.

== Career ==
In 2013, Eupakaree won the Malaysian Open beaten Amin Abdul-Ghani, and also reached the final phase at the Hong Kong Open in the same year. In 2015, he took part in the 2015 PDC World Cup of Darts for the first time together with Thanawat Yong, where they lost to Brendan Dolan and Mickey Mansell from Northern Ireland by 2–5 in legs.

For the next three years, Eupakaree competed in the PDC World Cup of Darts together with Yong. In 2016, they lost their opening match against Nándor Bezzeg and Patrik Kovács from Hungary, and they were also unsuccessful against John Michael and Ioannis Selachoglou from Greece and Gerwyn Price and Jonny Clayton from Wales in next two editions.

In 2019, Thailand was no longer invited and so it became quiet about Eupakaree, who continued to compete in World Darts Federation tournaments in Asia. He also competed in the PDC Asian Tour. There he made it to the quarter-finals in June 2019, and the Thai has not taken part in any tournament since coronavirus pandemic.

== Performance timeline ==
Tournament	2015	2016	2017	2018
PDC Non-ranked televised events
World Cup of Darts	1R	1R	1R	1R
