= Daniele Petri =

Italian darts player

Personal information
- Nickname: "Pedro"
- Born: 3 September 1980 (age 46) Udine, Italy
- Home town: Udine, Italy

Sport
- Sport: Darts
- Playing since: 2002
- Darts: 23g customs
- Laterality: Right-handed
- Walk-on music: "Virtual Insanity" by Jamiroquai

Organisation (see split in darts)
- PDC: 2013–
- WDF: 2010–
Medal record
Men's Darts
Representing Italy
WDF World Cup
Gold medal – first place	2025 Seoul	Men's pairs

Daniele Petri (born 3 September 1980) is an Italian professional darts player who currently plays in World Darts Federation (WDF) and Professional Darts Corporation (PDC) events. He represented his country during the WDF World Cup, WDF Europe Cup and PDC World Cup of Darts. Together with Alex Bassetti, he won a historic gold medal for Italy in the pairs competition at the WDF World Cup.

== Early life ==
Petri has stated that he first began playing darts after playing for fun in a pub in 2002.

== Career ==
He first made his mark when he played in the 2013 PDC World Cup of Darts with Matteo dal Monte and failed to get out the group stages, losing to Spain (Carlos Rodriguez and Antonio Alcinas) 5-3 and then Wales (Mark Webster and Richie Burnett) 5-0. He then played in the 2014 PDC World Cup of Darts and 2015 PDC World Cup of Darts, teaming up with Marco Brentegani, losing to Netherlands (Michael van Gerwen and Raymond van Barneveld) 5-2 and Gibraltar (Dyson Parody and Manuel Vilerio) by the same score.

In the 2016 PDC World Cup of Darts campaign, teaming up Michel Furlani, they were whitewashed by Austria (Mensur Suljović and Rowby-John Rodriguez) 5-0, only averaging 76.93. Petri did have some success in the PDC when he played in the 2016 European Darts Open, become the first Italian to qualify for a European Tour event, taking legs off James Richardson, eventually losing 6-3.

In 2017, he again played in the 2017 PDC World Cup of Darts event, playing with Gabriel Rollo. They lost to the United States (Darin Young and Larry Butler) 5-1, averaging 83.48.

In 2020, he again played in the 2020 PDC World Cup of Darts events, played with Andrea Micheletti.
