= 2015 German Darts Masters =

Tournament information
- Dates: 4–6 April 2015
- Venue: Ballhausforum
- Location: Munich, Germany
- Organisation(s): Professional Darts Corporation (PDC)
- Format: Legs
- Prize fund: £115,000
- Winner's share: £25,000
- High checkout: 158 Vincent van der Voort

Champion(s)
- Michael van Gerwen (NED)

The 2015 German Darts Masters was the third of nine PDC European Tour events on the 2015 PDC Pro Tour. The tournament took place in the Ballhausforum, Munich, Germany, from 4 to 6 April 2015. It featured a field of 48 players and £115,000 in prize money, with £25,000 going to the winner.

Phil Taylor was the defending champion, but he withdrew before the event started due to illness.

Michael van Gerwen won his third consecutive European Tour title in 2015 by defeating John Henderson 6–5 in the final.

== Prize money ==
The prize fund was increased to £115,000 after being £100,000 for the previous two years.

| Stage (num. of players) | | Prize money |
|---|---|---|
| Winner | (1) | £25,000 |
| Runner-up | (1) | £10,000 |
| Semi-finalists | (2) | £5,000 |
| Quarter-finalists | (4) | £3,500 |
| Third round losers | (8) | £2,000 |
| Second round losers | (16) | £1,500 |
| First round losers | (16) | £1,000 |
| Total | £115,000 | |

== Qualification and format ==
The top 16 players from the PDC ProTour Order of Merit on 8 March 2015 automatically qualified for the event. The remaining 32 places went to players from three qualifying events - 20 from the UK Qualifier (held in Barnsley on 13 March), eight from the European Qualifier and four from the Host Nation Qualifier (both held at the venue before the day before the event started).

Phil Taylor withdrew due to illness a day before the start of the tournament. Jamie Caven, the highest ranked UK Qualifier, was moved up to the top 16 of the PDC ProTour Order of Merit. Therefore, there was a free place for the Host Nation Qualifier.

The following players took part in the tournament:

Top 16
1. (Netherlands) Michael van Gerwen (winner)
2. (England) Michael Smith (second round)
3. (England) James Wade (quarter-finals)
4. (Scotland) Peter Wright (semi-finals)
5. (Scotland) Robert Thornton (quarter-finals)
6. (England) Adrian Lewis (semi-finals)
7. (Northern Ireland) Brendan Dolan (quarter-finals)
8. (England) Ian White (second round)
9. (Netherlands) Vincent van der Voort (third round)
10. (Australia) Simon Whitlock (third round)
11. (England) Mervyn King (second round)
12. (England) Justin Pipe (second round)
13. (Belgium) Kim Huybrechts (second round)
14. (England) Terry Jenkins (third round)
15. (England) Steve Beaton (second round)
16. (England) Jamie Caven (third round)

UK Qualifier
- (Canada) Ken MacNeil (first round)
- (Northern Ireland) Mickey Mansell (second round)
- (England) Andy Boulton (first round)
- (England) Andrew Gilding (third round)
- (England) David Pallett (second round)
- (Northern Ireland) Daryl Gurney (first round)
- (England) Darren Webster (second round)
- (England) Andy Smith (second round)
- (England) Wes Newton (third round)
- (Republic of Ireland) William O'Connor (quarter-finals)
- (England) Dennis Smith (first round)
- (Scotland) John Henderson (runner-up)
- (Wales) Kurt Parry (second round)
- (Scotland) Gary Stone (second round)
- (England) Josh Payne (first round)
- (England) Lee Palfreyman (first round)
- (England) Keegan Brown (second round)
- (Scotland) Jamie Bain (third round)
- (Wales) Jamie Lewis (second round)

European Qualifier
- (Austria) Rowby-John Rodriguez (first round)
- (Netherlands) Jan Dekker (first round)
- (Belgium) Ronny Huybrechts (second round)
- (Netherlands) Benito van de Pas (second round)
- (Netherlands) Jeffrey de Zwaan (first round)
- (Austria) Armin Glanzer (first round)
- (Austria) Mensur Suljović (third round)
- (Spain) Cristo Reyes (first round)

Host Nation Qualifier
- (Germany) Tomas Seyler (first round)
- (Germany) Andree Welge (first round)
- (Germany) Jyhan Artut (first round)
- (Germany) Daniel Zygla (first round)
- (Germany) Stefan Stoyke (first round)

== Draw ==
First round (best of 11 legs); 4 April
(Austria) Rowby-John Rodriguez 83.15 | 4
(Scotland) Gary Stone 80.58 | 6
(Belgium) Ronny Huybrechts 82.46 | 6
(England) Dennis Smith 80.38 | 4
(Republic of Ireland) William O'Connor 86.03 | 6
(Austria) Armin Glanzer 78.10 | 3
(England) Andy Smith 94.12 | 6
(Germany) Daniel Zygla 88.52 | 3
(England) Darren Webster 95.83 | 6
(Netherlands) Jeffrey de Zwaan 87.09 | 3
(Austria) Mensur Suljović 91.08 | 6
(Germany) Jyhan Artut 87.71 | 5
(England) Keegan Brown 89.98 | 6
(England) Josh Payne 84.07 | 2
(Scotland) Jamie Bain 90.43 | 6
(Germany) Andree Welge 88.81 | 2
(Scotland) John Henderson 90.50 | 6
(Spain) Cristo Reyes 86.70 | 3
(England) Andrew Gilding 94.73 | 6
(England) Lee Palfreyman 84.11 | 1
(Northern Ireland) Mickey Mansell 79.85 | 6
(Germany) Tomas Seyler 71.95 | 1
(England) David Pallett 93.16 | 6
(Canada) Ken MacNeil 82.92 | 5
(Northern Ireland) Daryl Gurney 90.66 | 5
(Wales) Kurt Parry 97.38 | 6
(England) Wes Newton 86.39 | 6
(Germany) Stefan Stoyke 83.70 | 2
(Netherlands) Benito van de Pas 95.54 | 6
(Netherlands) Jan Dekker 89.07 | 2
(Wales) Jamie Lewis 88.25 | 6
(England) Andy Boulton 84.95 | 3

Second round (best of 11 legs); 5 April
1 | (Netherlands) Michael van Gerwen 100.78 | 6
(Scotland) Gary Stone 87.77 | 2
16 | (England) Jamie Caven 95.57 | 6
(Belgium) Ronny Huybrechts 90.97 | 4
8 | (England) Ian White 89.04 | 1
(Republic of Ireland) William O'Connor 89.60 | 6
9 | (Netherlands) Vincent van der Voort 93.54 | 6
(England) Andy Smith 91.71 | 3
5 | (Scotland) Robert Thornton 91.03 | 6
(England) Darren Webster 80.86 | 3
12 | (England) Justin Pipe 101.28 | 4
(Austria) Mensur Suljović 102.02 | 6
4 | (Scotland) Peter Wright 99.64 | 6
(England) Keegan Brown 97.04 | 2
13 | (Belgium) Kim Huybrechts 91.87 | 5
(Scotland) Jamie Bain 90.21 | 6
2 | (England) Michael Smith 93.13 | 4
(Scotland) John Henderson 96.21 | 6
15 | (England) Steve Beaton 94.73 | 4
(England) Andrew Gilding 96.00 | 6
7 | (Northern Ireland) Brendan Dolan 93.98 | 6
(Northern Ireland) Mickey Mansell 91.05 | 3
10 | (Australia) Simon Whitlock 94.20 | 6
(England) David Pallett 99.97 | 4
6 | (England) Adrian Lewis 102.73 | 6
(Wales) Kurt Parry 98.30 | 3
11 | (England) Mervyn King 92.98 | 2
(England) Wes Newton 89.66 | 6
3 | (England) James Wade 103.66 | 6
(Netherlands) Benito van de Pas 89.00 | 0
14 | (England) Terry Jenkins 94.32 | 6
(Wales) Jamie Lewis 89.86 | 4

Third round (best of 11 legs); 6 April
1 | (Netherlands) van Gerwen 107.13 | 6
16 | (England) Caven 97.14 | 5
(Republic of Ireland) O'Connor 97.41 | 6
9 | (Netherlands) van der Voort 94.56 | 3
5 | (Scotland) Thornton 95.76 | 6
(Austria) Suljović 93.75 | 3
4 | (Scotland) Wright 100.25 | 6
(Scotland) Bain 92.71 | 3
(Scotland) Henderson 102.48 | 6
(England) Gilding 90.11 | 0
7 | (Northern Ireland) Dolan 86.66 | 6
10 | (Australia) Whitlock 98.37 | 3
6 | (England) A. Lewis 93.91 | 6
(England) Newton 100.39 | 5
3 | (England) Wade 90.52 | 6
14 | (England) Jenkins 87.27 | 3

Quarter-finals (best of 11 legs); 6 April
1 | (Netherlands) van Gerwen 100.33 | 6
(Republic of Ireland) O'Connor 92.70 | 4
5 | (Scotland) Thornton 90.12 | 5
4 | (Scotland) Wright 89.72 | 6
(Scotland) Henderson 107.72 | 6
7 | (Northern Ireland) Dolan 90.71 | 1
6 | (England) A. Lewis 102.48 | 6
3 | (England) Wade 78.71 | 0

Semi-finals (best of 11 legs); 6 April
1 | (Netherlands) van Gerwen 113.63 | 6
4 | (Scotland) Wright 100.25 | 1
(Scotland) Henderson 94.08 | 6
6 | (England) A. Lewis 89.51 | 4

Final (best of 11 legs); 6 April
1 | (Netherlands) van Gerwen 102.30 | 6
(Scotland) Henderson 89.59 | 5
