= Harith Lim =

Singaporean darts player

Personal information
- Nickname: "Goldfinger"
- Born: 11 April 1970 (age 56) Singapore
- Home town: Singapore

Sport
- Sport: Darts
- Playing since: 1984
- Darts: 18g Cosmo Darts Goldfinger
- Laterality: Left-handed
- Walk-on music: "Hall of Fame" by The Script ft. Will.i.am

Organisation (see split in darts)
- BDO: 1987–1992
- PDC: 2012–

WDF major events – best performances
- World Masters: Last 128: 1989

Other tournament wins
- Tournament: Years
- BDO World Youth Masters Malaysian Open: 1986; 1992
Medal record
Men's Darts
Representing Singapore
WDF World Cup
Bronze medal – third place	1989 Toronto	Men's pairs

Harith Lim (born 11 April 1970) is a Singaporean professional darts player who plays in Professional Darts Corporation (PDC) events.

== Career ==
He first came into prominence in 1986, when he won the BDO World Youth Masters, defeating Rowan Barry of Australia in the final. He is mainly seen on the soft tip circuit, but has appeared in some steel tip action. He Runner-Up the number 4 seed of 1987 BDO World Youth Championship defeating champion 1986 Mark Day and losing to Rowan Barry of Australia.

He has represented Singapore along with Paul Lim (no relation) in eight PDC World Cup of Darts tournaments, with their biggest success being in the 2017 tournament when they defeated the top seeds Scotland (consisting of Gary Anderson and Peter Wright), then knocked out the Spanish pairing of Cristo Reyes and Antonio Alcinas, before losing the quarter-final to Belgium, although Harith defeated Ronny Huybrechts in his singles match, before he and Paul lost to Kim and Ronny in the doubles.

== Performance timeline ==
PDC

Tournament	2014	2015	2016	2017	2018	2019	2020	2021	2022	2023	2024
Non-ranked televised events
PDC World Cup of Darts	2R	1R	2R	QF	2R	2R	WD	2R	1R	RR	RR

BDO

Tournament	1989
Winmau World Masters	L128

Performance Table Legend
DNP	Did not play at the event	DNQ	Did not qualify for the event	NYF	Not yet founded	#R	lost in the early rounds of the tournament (WR = Wildcard round, RR = Round robin)
QF	lost in the quarter-finals	SF	lost in the semi-finals	F	lost in the final	W	won the tournament
