= William O'Connor (darts player) =

Irish darts player

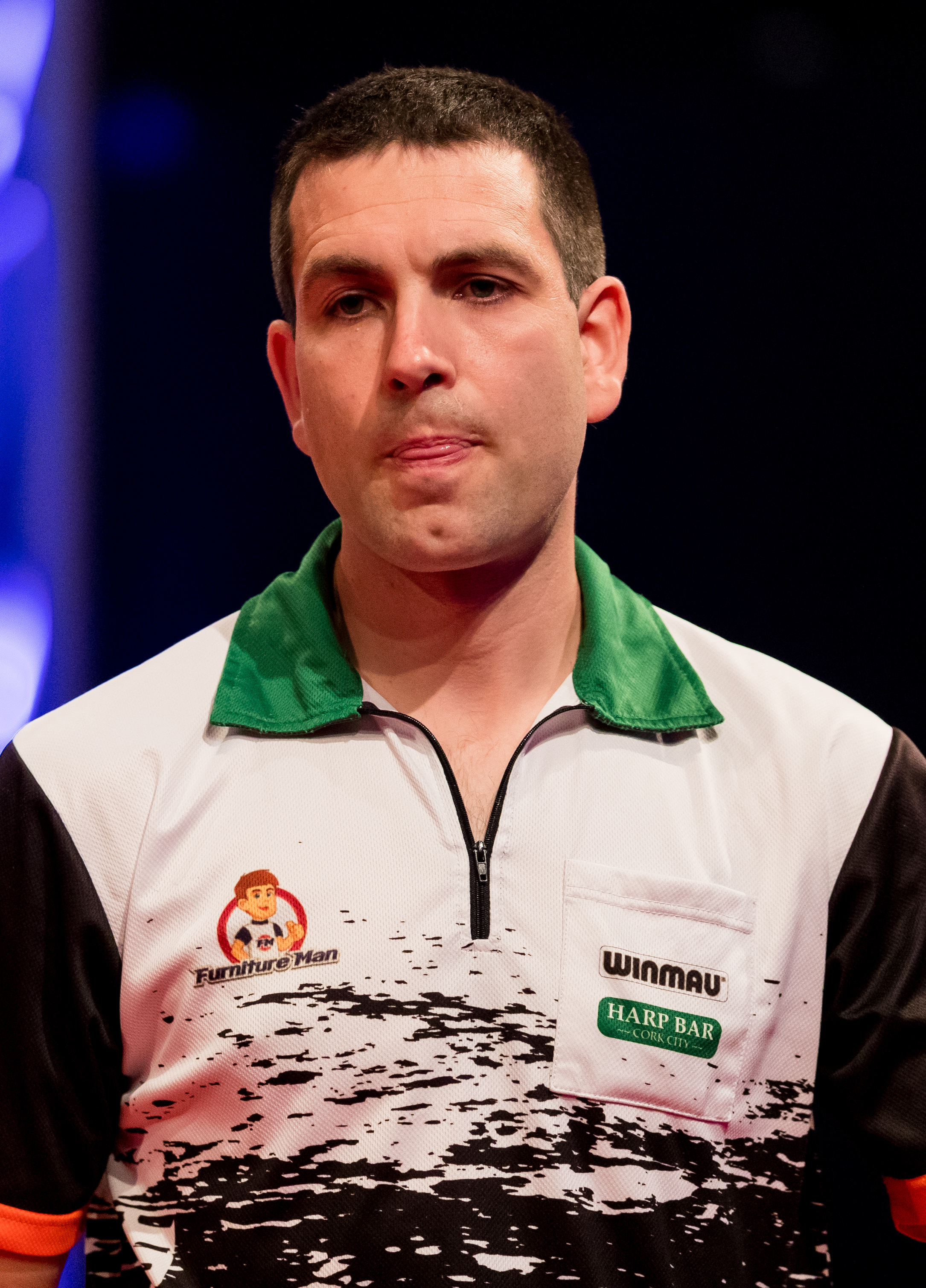
- O'Connor in 2019

Personal information
- Nickname: "The Magpie"
- Born: 15 July 1986 (age 40) Limerick, Ireland
- Home town: Cappamore, County Limerick, Ireland

Sport
- Sport: Darts
- Playing since: 2005
- Darts: 23g Shot Signature
- Laterality: Right-handed
- Walk-on music: "Zombie" by The Cranberries

Organisation (see split in darts)
- PDC: 2009–present (Tour Card: 2011–present)
- Current world ranking: (PDC) 29 ▲1 (5 November 2026)

WDF major events – best performances
- World Masters: Last 264: 2009

PDC premier events – best performances
- World Championship: Last 32: 2019, 2022
- World Matchplay: Last 32: 2026
- World Grand Prix: Last 32: 2010, 2011, 2012, 2015, 2026
- UK Open: Semi-final: 2022
- Grand Slam: Group Stage: 2019
- European Championship: Quarter-final: 2020
- Premier League: Challenger: 2020
- PC Finals: Quarter-final: 2019
- Masters: Last 16: 2025
- World Series Finals: Last 16: 2023

Other tournament wins
- Years
Tom Kirby Memorial Irish Matchplay	2017
Players Championships
2019 PC13

William O'Connor (born 15 July 1986) is an Irish professional darts player who competes in Professional Darts Corporation (PDC) events. Nicknamed "the Magpie", O'Connor has been a professional since 2011. He has participated in nine PDC World Championships and reached his first PDC major semi-final at the 2022 UK Open. O'Connor won his first PDC ranking title at Players Championship 13 on the 2019 PDC Pro Tour. He has finished as the runner-up in two PDC European Tour events.

O'Connor has represented Ireland at the PDC World Cup of Darts in every year it has been held, reaching the final at the 2019 edition alongside Steve Lennon.

== Career ==
O'Connor first came to prominence at the 2010 UK Open when he whitewashed Stuart Monaghan in the first round 6–0 in legs. He then defeated Mark Frost and Peter Wright to reach the fourth round, where he played world number 3 James Wade on the main board and lost 9–3. He qualified for the 2010 World Grand Prix, where he lost to Barrie Bates in the first round 2–0 in sets.

O'Connor along with Mick McGowan represented Ireland at the inaugural PDC World Cup of Darts in 2010. The pair defeated Slovakia in the first round 6–3 in legs. However, they were narrowly beaten in the second round by the Australian duo of Simon Whitlock and Paul Nicholson 6–5, who were number 4 and 16 in the world rankings respectively.

He played in his second World Cup for Ireland in 2012, again paired with McGowan and, as in 2010, they reached the second round this time by defeating Malaysia 5–2. They played the same Australian pair as in 2010 next and were whitewashed 0–4. The next week he reached the quarter-finals of the first UK Open Qualifier, but was defeated by Kevin Painter 4–6. This would later prove to be O'Connor's deepest run in a tournament in 2012. During the year he qualified for three of the five European Tour events. He was knocked out in the first round of the first two, but at the German Darts Masters he saw off Painter 6–5, before losing 3–6 to Wayne Jones. O'Connor was one of the two Irish qualifiers for the World Grand Prix and missed a dart for the match in the first round against Vincent van der Voort, losing 1–2 in sets.

O'Connor began 2013 ranked world number 54, and played in his third World Cup of Darts and first with Connie Finnan in February. The pair beat Denmark 5–0 in their first match and despite losing to South Africa 4–5 they finished top of Group B on leg difference to reach the last 16. They faced Japan and were defeated 3–5. O'Connor was beaten 9–4 by Dave Chisnall in the third round of the UK Open having earlier seen off Robbie Singleton and Johnny Haines. He struggled for form after this until the first weekend of November when he lost in the last 16 to Mensur Suljović and Gary Anderson in two Players Championships, earning himself £2,000 in the process.

O'Connor entered 2014 ranked world number 68, just outside the top 64 who had full playing privileges for the year ahead. He entered Q School and had his best result on the third day when he was defeated 5–0 by Pete Dyos in the last 16. The result helped him finish 24th on the Q School Order of Merit to claim the final place on offer for a two-year tour card. He was edged out in the third round of the UK Open 9–8 by Jamie Lewis. O'Connor and Finnan lost five successive legs in the first round of the World Cup of Darts to be beaten 5–3 by Singapore. He was knocked out in the first round of two European Tour events, before picking up his first victory of the season at the European Darts Trophy by averaging 104.36 in a 6–4 win over Mensur Suljović. In the second round, O'Connor was 5–4 ahead of Justin Pipe but bust his score when on 70 and missed one match dart at double six to be beaten 6–5.

At the 2015 UK Open, O'Connor overcame Dean Winstanley 5–3, Mark Webster 9–5 and Ian White 9–6 to reach the fifth round of the event for the first time where he played Stephen Bunting. The opening eight legs were shared, before Bunting took four of the next five and he went on to eliminate O'Connor 9–6. He saw off Ian White 6–1 and Vincent van der Voort 6–3 to reach his first quarter-final in three years and first in a European Tour event at the German Darts Masters. O'Connor led world number one Michael van Gerwen 3–1, but went on to lose 6–4 despite taking out three 100 plus finishes. O'Connor and Finnan's World Cup second round match with Hong Kong went to a doubles match which they lost 4–3. O'Connor was unable to advance past the first round of the World Grand Prix for the fourth time as he missed two match darts against Jamie Lewis.

In 2016, O'Connor was beaten 6–5 by Jeffrey de Graaf in the second round of the UK Open. He ousted Tomas Seyler 6–3 and Kim Huybrechts 6–1 at the German Darts Masters, before losing 6–2 to Gary Anderson in the third round. O'Connor did not get past the last 64 of any individual event in the rest of the year. At the World Cup he and Mick McGowan squeezed past Hong Kong 5–4 in the first round, but they exited the tournament in the next round after they lost their singles matches to the Northern Irish team of Daryl Gurney and Brendan Dolan.

O'Connor just avoided having to enter PDC Q-School in 2017 as he was ranked 64th on the Order of Merit, keeping his PDC Tour Card. He kicked off 2017 when he defeated Max Hopp, Christian Kist, Keegan Brown, Ritchie Edhouse and Devon Peterson on the way to a quarter final in UK Open Qualifier 1. He eventually lost to Ricky Evans, but coupled with a run to the Last 32 in Qualifier 5, he did enough to make his way into the 2017 UK Open. O'Connor entered the UK Open in the second round, where he took on fellow Irishman Steve Lennon. O'Connor got the better of Lennon 6–2 to book a spot in the Last 64. Here, he played Mick Todd, who O'Connor beat 10–3 over the longer format. In the Last 32, he played Ronnie Baxter, with O'Connor claiming a super 10–6 win to reach his second ever UK Open Last 16. Simon Whitlock was his opponent, and the Aussie proved just too much, defeating O'Connor 10–7, although the Limerick man picked up £6,500 for his run. O'Connor continued his form in Barnsley the following weekend, reaching the Last 16 of Players Championship 3, and the Last 32 of Players Championship 4. He defeated Zoran Lerchbacher and Christian Kist to set up a tie with the world champion Michael van Gerwen in the Last 32. O'Connor beat van Gerwen 6–4, but lost to Ritchie Edhouse in the following round. In Players Championship 4 the next day, he beat Jermaine Wattimena and Mick Todd, but was beaten by Mensur Suljović in the Last 32. O'Connor then had a couple of bad months, with his best result being a Last 32 in Players Championship 12, where he defeated Ronnie Baxter and Paul Harvey before a 6–5 loss to Steve Lennon. He once again teamed up with Mick McGowan at the World Cup of Darts.

O'Connor reached his first PDC final at the 2018 European Darts Matchplay, losing to Michael van Gerwen by a scoreline of 8–2. He then won a first PDC title at Players Championship 13 on 30 April 2019, beating Nathan Aspinall 8–4 in the final.

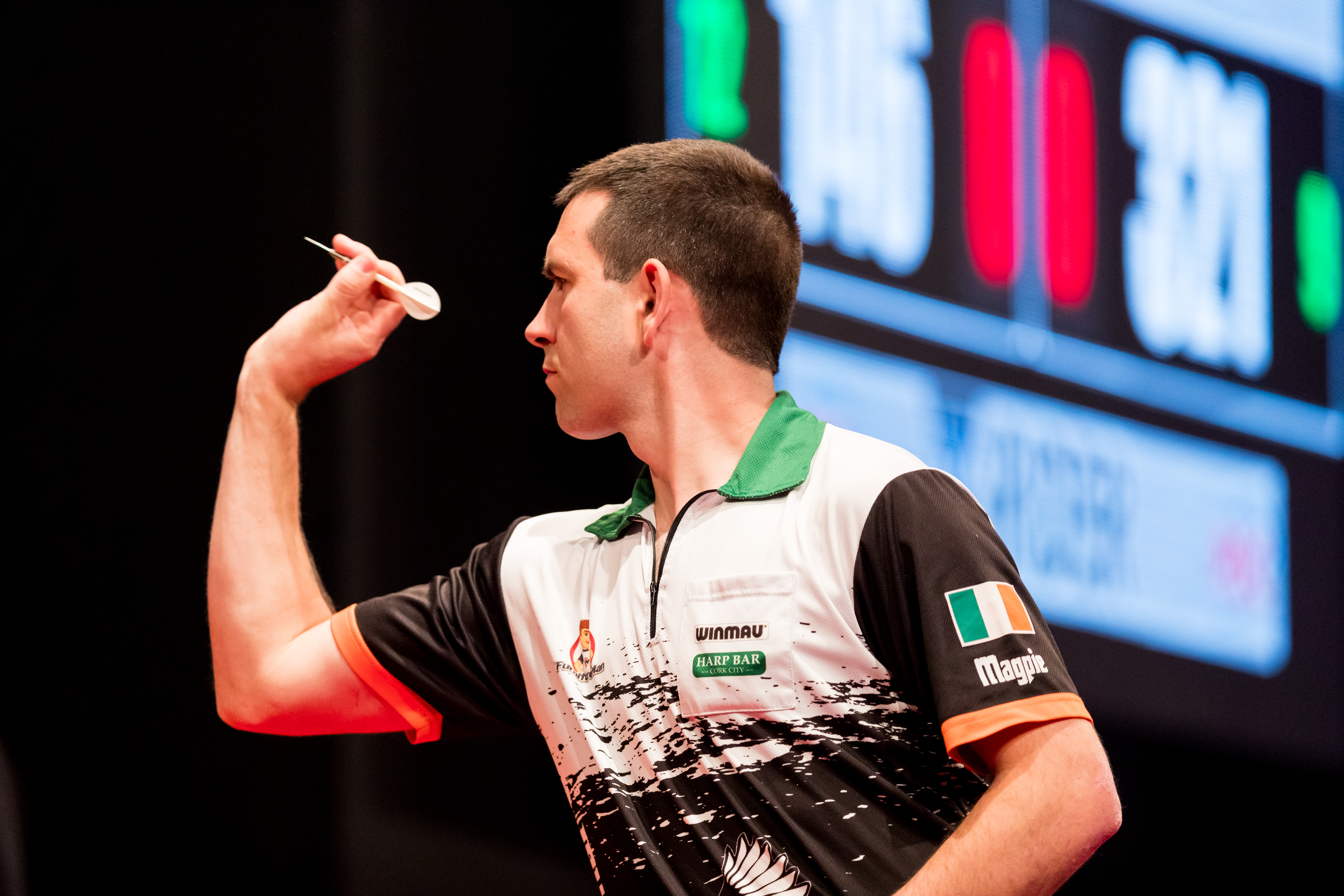
O'Connor at the 2019 European Darts Matchplay

In June 2019, O'Connor alongside Steve Lennon made it all the way to the final of the 2019 PDC World Cup of Darts where they eventually lost to Scotland 3–1.

In the 2020 PDC World Championship, O'Connor made an apparent calculation blunder in losing his second round match against Gerwyn Price.

O'Connor was selected as a 'challenger' for the 2020 Premier League night in Dublin, Ireland.

In March 2022, O'Connor reached the semi-finals of the 2022 UK Open, recording wins over Connor Scutt, Stephen Bunting, Sebastian Białecki and recent world champion Peter Wright before losing 9-11 to eventual champion Danny Noppert. O'Connor was again joined by Steve Lennon for the World Cup of Darts, beating Canada 5-2 in the first round before losing 2-0 to the Netherlands. In September 2022, O'Connor reached his second European Tour final, losing 8-3 to Joe Cullen in the 2022 Hungarian Darts Trophy, after beating the likes of Nathan Aspinall, Michael Smith and Dimitri Van den Bergh in earlier rounds.

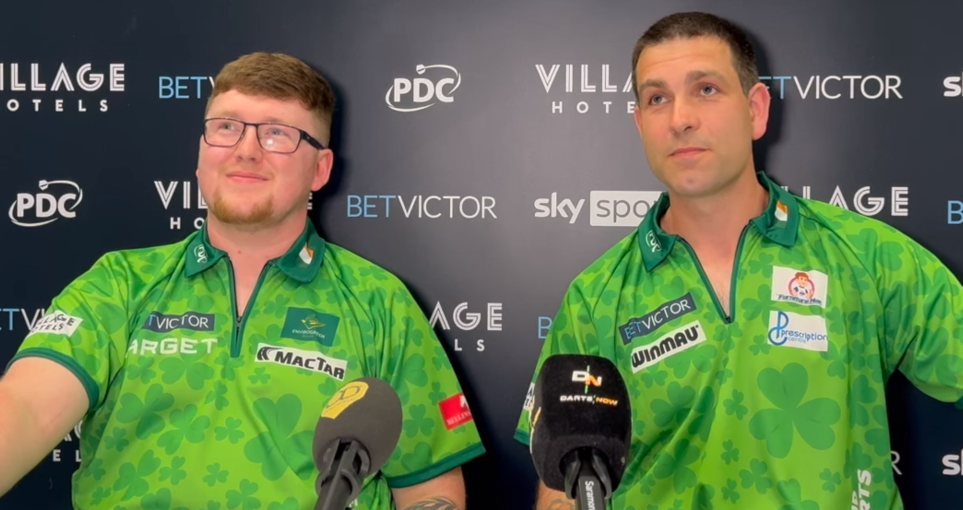
O'Connor (right) and his Irish teammate Keane Barry at the 2024 PDC World Cup of Darts

O'Connor defeated tournament debutant Beau Greaves 3–0 in the first round of the 2023 World Championship, before losing 3–0 to Gabriel Clemens in the next round. He was joined by a new teammate at the 2023 World Cup of Darts as Keane Barry replaced Steve Lennon. The pair were eliminated in the group stage, finishing second in their group behind Croatia. At the World Series of Darts Finals in September 2023, O'Connor took a 3–0 lead against Michael van Gerwen in the second round before losing 6–4. He began the 2024 World Championship with a 3–0 victory over Bhav Patel. He lost 3–2 to Chris Dobey in the second round. At the 2024 World Cup of Darts, O'Connor and Barry suffered a shock elimination in the group stage as Ireland lost 4–3 to debutants Chinese Taipei. O'Connor made the semi-finals of Players Championship 30 in October 2024.

O'Connor was beaten 3–1 by compatriot Dylan Slevin in the first round of the 2025 World Championship. After progressing through the preliminary rounds of the 2025 PDC World Masters, he earned an upset win over world number four Rob Cross in the first round, defeating the former world champion 3–1. He was beaten 4–0 by Danny Noppert in the second round. He hit a nine-dart finish on his way to the quarter-finals of Players Championship 7 in March 2025. Following back-to-back group-stage exits, O'Connor and Barry reached the quarter-finals of the 2025 World Cup of Darts, where they were defeated 8–5 by eventual champions Northern Ireland. Having reached consecutive semi-finals at Players Championship 25 and 26, O'Connor was a finalist at Players Championship 33 in October 2025, losing 8–6 to Chris Dobey.

At the 2026 World Championship, O'Connor beat Krzysztof Kciuk 3–0 in the first round. He was eliminated by Michael van Gerwen in a 3–1 defeat in the second round. He reached the final of Players Championship 20 in June 2026, losing 8–5 to Ross Smith. Later in June, O'Connor and Barry reached the quarter-finals of the World Cup of Darts for the second straight year, where they were beaten 8–5 by Scotland. He made his World Matchplay debut the following month, where he lost his first-round match 10–6 to Ryan Searle.

== World Championship results ==
=== PDC ===
- 2018: First round (lost to Steve Beaton 1–3)
- 2019: Third round (lost to Ryan Searle 1–4)
- 2020: Second round (lost to Gerwyn Price 2–3)
- 2021: Second round (lost to Daryl Gurney 2–3)
- 2022: Third round (lost to Michael Smith 2–4)
- 2023: Second round (lost to Gabriel Clemens 0–3)
- 2024: Second round (lost to Chris Dobey 2–3)
- 2025: First round (lost to Dylan Slevin 1–3)
- 2026: Second round (lost to Michael van Gerwen 1–3)

== Career finals ==
=== PDC team finals: 1 ===
Outcome	No.	Year	Championship	Country	Teammate	Opponents in the final	Score (Note: (l) = score in legs, (s) = score in sets, (m) = score in matches.)
Runner-up	1.	2019	World Cup	Ireland	Steve Lennon	Scotland – Peter Wright and Gary Anderson	1–3 (m)

== Performance timeline ==
Tournament	2010	2011	2012	2013	2014	2015	2016	2017	2018	2019	2020	2021	2022	2023	2024	2025	2026
PDC Ranked televised events
World Championship	Did not qualify								1R	3R	2R	2R	3R	2R	2R	1R	2R
World Masters (Note: A non-ranked event until 2025.)	Not held			Did not qualify												2R	Prel.
UK Open	4R	2R	3R	3R	3R	5R	2R	5R	DNQ	3R	5R	3R	SF	6R	3R	6R	4R
World Matchplay	Did not qualify																1R
World Grand Prix	1R	1R	1R	DNQ		1R	Did not qualify										1R
European Championship	Did not qualify								1R	1R	QF	Did not qualify					1R
Grand Slam	Did not qualify									RR	Did not qualify						
Players Championship Finals	Did not qualify							3R	DNQ	QF	1R	3R	1R	1R	1R	1R	
PDC Non-ranked televised events
Premier League	Did not participate										C	Did not participate					
World Cup	2R	NH	2R	2R	1R	2R	2R	2R	1R	F	1R	1R	2R	RR	RR	QF	QF
World Series Finals	Not held					Did not qualify								2R	DNQ		DNP
Career statistics
Year-end ranking	79	57	55	71	-	62	64	58	45	37	36	37	37	42	52	43	

=== PDC European Tour ===
Season	1	2	3	4	5	6	7	8	9	10	11	12	13	14	15
2012	ADO; 1R	GDC; 1R	EDO; DNQ	GDM; 2R	DDM; DNQ										
2013	Did not qualify						GDM; 1R	DDM; DNQ							
2014	Did not qualify			ADO; 1R	GDT; DNQ	EDO; 1R	EDG; DNQ	EDT; 2R							
2015	DNP		GDM; QF	DDM; 2R	IDO; 2R	DNQ		EDM; 2R	EDG; DNQ						
2016	DDM; DNQ	GDM; 3R	Did not qualify												
2017	Did not qualify										IDO; 2R	EDT; DNQ			
2018	EDO; DNQ	GDG; 1R	GDO; 1R	DNQ		DDM; 3R	GDT; DNQ	DDO; 1R	EDM; F	GDC; DNQ	DDC; 3R	DNQ			
2019	Did not qualify						DDM; 2R	DDO; 2R	CDO; 2R	ADC; 1R	EDM; 3R	IDO; 2R	GDT; 1R		
2020	BDC; DNQ	GDC; 2R	EDG; 2R	IDO; DNQ											
2021	HDT; 2R	GDT; DNQ													
2022	Did not qualify									HDT; F	GDO; DNQ	BDO; DNQ	GDT; 2R		
2023	BSD; 1R	EDO; 3R	DNQ		ADO; 1R	Did not qualify				EDM; 1R	GDO; DNQ	HDT; 1R	GDC; DNQ		
2024	DNQ		IDO; 2R	Did not qualify			DDC; 1R	Did not qualify							
2025	DNQ		IDO; 1R	GDG; DNQ	ADO; 1R	EDG; 1R	DDC; QF	EDO; 1R	BSD; 2R	FDT; DNQ	CDO; 2R	HDT; DNQ	SDT; 2R	GDC; 2R	
2026	PDO; 2R	EDT; 1R	BDO; 2R	GDG; 3R	EDG; 1R	ADO; 2R	IDO; 2R	BSD; 3R	SDO; 2R	EDO; 1R	HDT; 2R	CDO; QF	FDT; 2R	SDT; 2R	DDC; 3R

=== PDC Players Championships ===
Season	1	2	3	4	5	6	7	8	9	10	11	12	13	14	15	16	17	18	19	20	21	22	23	24	25	26	27	28	29	30	31	32	33	34	35	36	37
2011	HAL; QF	HAL; 1R	DER; 2R	DER; 1R	CRA; QF	CRA; 2R	VIE; 3R	VIE; 2R	CRA; DNP		BAR; 2R	BAR; 3R	NUL; 1R	NUL; 2R	ONT; DNP		DER; 1R	DER; 2R	NUL; 1R	NUL; 2R	DUB; 3R	DUB; 1R	KIL; 1R	GLA; 2R	GLA; 3R	ALI; 1R	ALI; 2R	CRA; 2R	CRA; 1R	WIG; 2R	WIG; 2R						
2012	ALI; 2R	ALI; 2R	REA; 2R	REA; 2R	CRA; 1R	CRA; 1R	BIR; 1R	BIR; 1R	CRA; 4R	CRA; 1R	BAR; 2R	BAR; 2R	DUB; 2R	DUB; 1R	KIL; 1R	KIL; 1R	CRA; 1R	CRA; 1R	BAR; 1R	BAR; 1R																	
2013	WIG; 1R	WIG; 1R	WIG; 1R	WIG; 1R	CRA; 1R	CRA; 1R	BAR; 1R	BAR; 1R	DUB; 1R	DUB; 1R	KIL; 1R	KIL; Prel.	WIG; 4R	WIG; 4R	BAR; 2R	BAR; 1R																					
2014	BAR; 1R	BAR; 1R	CRA; 3R	CRA; 2R	WIG; 2R	WIG; 1R	WIG; 2R	WIG; 1R	CRA; 1R	CRA; 2R	COV; 2R	COV; 1R	CRA; 2R	CRA; 1R	DUB; 1R	DUB; 2R	CRA; 1R	CRA; 2R	COV; 2R	COV; 1R																	
2015	BAR; 1R	BAR; 1R	BAR; 2R	BAR; 2R	BAR; 3R	COV; 3R	COV; 2R	COV; 1R	CRA; 1R	CRA; 1R	BAR; 1R	BAR; 3R	WIG; 1R	WIG; 2R	BAR; 1R	BAR; 1R	DUB; 1R	DUB; 1R	COV; 2R	COV; 2R																	
2016	BAR; DNP		BAR; 1R	BAR; 1R	BAR; 2R	BAR; 1R	BAR; 2R	COV; 1R	COV; 2R	BAR; 2R	BAR; 1R	BAR; 2R	BAR; 1R	BAR; 2R	BAR; 1R	BAR; 2R	DUB; 1R	DUB; 2R	BAR; 1R	BAR; 1R																	
2017	BAR; 3R	BAR; 2R	BAR; 4R	BAR; 3R	MIL; 1R	MIL; 1R	BAR; 2R	BAR; 1R	WIG; 2R	WIG; 1R	MIL; 1R	MIL; 3R	WIG; 2R	WIG; 2R	BAR; 2R	BAR; 1R	BAR; 1R	BAR; QF	DUB; 1R	DUB; 2R	BAR; SF	BAR; 1R															
2018	BAR; 3R	BAR; 1R	BAR; 1R	BAR; 1R	MIL; QF	MIL; 1R	BAR; DNP		WIG; 2R	WIG; 1R	MIL; 1R	MIL; 2R	WIG; 2R	WIG; 1R	BAR; 2R	BAR; 1R	BAR; 1R	BAR; 3R	DUB; 1R	DUB; 1R	BAR; QF	BAR; 1R															
2019	WIG; 1R	WIG; 2R	WIG; 3R	WIG; 1R	BAR; 1R	BAR; 1R	WIG; 1R	WIG; 2R	BAR; 1R	BAR; 1R	BAR; 1R	BAR; 3R	BAR; W	BAR; 2R	BAR; 1R	BAR; 2R	WIG; 4R	WIG; QF	BAR; 2R	BAR; 1R	HIL; 3R	HIL; 3R	BAR; 2R	BAR; 1R	BAR; 1R	BAR; 2R	DUB; 1R	DUB; 2R	BAR; 1R	BAR; 1R							
2020	BAR; 1R	BAR; 2R	WIG; 2R	WIG; 1R	WIG; QF	WIG; 1R	BAR; 3R	BAR; 1R	MIL; 1R	MIL; 1R	MIL; 1R	MIL; 2R	MIL; 2R	NIE; 2R	NIE; 1R	NIE; 2R	NIE; 4R	NIE; 1R	COV; 2R	COV; 2R	COV; SF	COV; 2R	COV; 3R														
2021	BOL; 2R	BOL; 2R	BOL; 2R	BOL; 1R	MIL; 2R	MIL; 1R	MIL; 2R	MIL; 3R	NIE; 2R	NIE; 3R	NIE; 1R	NIE; 3R	MIL; 2R	MIL; 2R	MIL; 2R	MIL; 2R	COV; 1R	COV; 2R	COV; 2R	COV; 1R	BAR; 1R	BAR; 1R	BAR; 2R	BAR; 2R	BAR; 3R	BAR; 1R	BAR; 1R	BAR; 2R	BAR; SF	BAR; 1R							
2022	BAR; 2R	BAR; 4R	WIG; 2R	WIG; 1R	BAR; 3R	BAR; 3R	NIE; 3R	NIE; 3R	BAR; 2R	BAR; 1R	BAR; 1R	BAR; 1R	BAR; 1R	WIG; 2R	WIG; 2R	NIE; 1R	NIE; 3R	BAR; 2R	BAR; 1R	BAR; 2R	BAR; 1R	BAR; 2R	BAR; 1R	BAR; 1R	BAR; 2R	BAR; 3R	BAR; 3R	BAR; 2R	BAR; QF	BAR; 2R							
2023	BAR; 2R	BAR; 1R	BAR; 1R	BAR; 1R	BAR; 1R	BAR; 1R	HIL; 3R	HIL; 3R	WIG; 1R	WIG; 1R	LEI; 3R	LEI; 2R	HIL; 4R	HIL; 2R	LEI; 1R	LEI; 3R	HIL; QF	HIL; 2R	BAR; 2R	BAR; 1R	BAR; 1R	BAR; 2R	BAR; 2R	BAR; 1R	BAR; 3R	BAR; 3R	BAR; 3R	BAR; 1R	BAR; 2R	BAR; 1R							
2024	WIG; 1R	WIG; 2R	LEI; 3R	LEI; 1R	HIL; 4R	HIL; 3R	LEI; 1R	LEI; 2R	HIL; 3R	HIL; 3R	HIL; 1R	HIL; 2R	MIL; 2R	MIL; 3R	MIL; 1R	MIL; 3R	MIL; 2R	MIL; 2R	MIL; 1R	WIG; 2R	WIG; 4R	MIL; 3R	MIL; 2R	WIG; 1R	WIG; 2R	WIG; 1R	WIG; 2R	WIG; 3R	LEI; 4R	LEI; SF							
2025	WIG; 2R	WIG; 3R	ROS; 1R	ROS; QF	LEI; 3R	LEI; 4R	HIL; QF	HIL; 3R	LEI; 1R	LEI; 3R	LEI; 4R	LEI; 2R	ROS; 2R	ROS; 1R	HIL; 3R	HIL; 1R	LEI; 4R	LEI; 1R	LEI; 4R	LEI; 1R	LEI; 1R	HIL; 2R	HIL; 3R	MIL; 2R	MIL; SF	HIL; SF	HIL; 3R	LEI; 1R	LEI; 3R	LEI; 2R	WIG; 3R	WIG; 3R	WIG; F	WIG; SF			
2026	HIL; 4R	HIL; 2R	WIG; 1R	WIG; 1R	LEI; 1R	LEI; 1R	LEI; 2R	LEI; 1R	WIG; 1R	WIG; 2R	MIL; QF	MIL; 3R	HIL; 3R	HIL; 3R	LEI; 2R	LEI; 2R	LEI; 2R	LEI; 3R	MIL; QF	MIL; F	WIG; 1R	WIG; 1R	LEI; 4R	LEI; 2R	HIL; 2R	HIL; 4R	LEI; 3R	LEI; 3R	ROS; SF	ROS; 1R	ROS; 2R	ROS; SF	LEI; 2R	LEI; 3R			

Key

Performance Table Legend
W	Won the tournament	F	Finalist	SF	Semifinalist	QF	Quarterfinalist	#R; RR; Prel.	Lost in # round Round-robin; Preliminary round	DQ	Disqualified
DNQ	Did not qualify	DNP	Did not participate	WD	Withdrew	NH	Tournament not held	#R; RR; Prel.	Lost in # round Round-robin; Preliminary round	NYF	Not yet founded
