= Boris Koltsov =

Russian darts player (born 1988)

Personal information
- Nickname: "The Viking"
- Born: 10 September 1988 (age 38) Batumi, Georgian SSR
- Home town: Khimki, Moscow, Russia

Sport
- Sport: Darts
- Playing since: 2011
- Darts: 21g Winmau Signature
- Laterality: Right-handed
- Walk-on music: "Valhalla Calling" by Miracle of Sound

Organisation (see split in darts)
- BDO: 2012–2014
- PDC: 2014–2020, 2021–2022
- WDF: 2020

WDF major events – best performances
- World Masters: Last 144: 2013

PDC premier events – best performances
- World Championship: Last 64: 2015, 2022
- UK Open: Last 128: 2021, 2022

Other tournament wins
- Years
EADC Pro Tour	2016 (x2), 2019 (x3), 2020
EADC Qualifier	2014, 2016, 2018
Finnish Open	2017, 2018
Kalashnikov Cup	2018
PDC Challenge Tour England	2019
WDF World Cup Pairs	2017
Russian Cup	2018, 2019
Salavat Yulaev Cup	2021

Boris Sergeevich Koltsov (Russian: Борис Сергеевич Кольцов; born 10 September 1988) is a Russian darts player who competes in Professional Darts Corporation (PDC) events.

== Career ==
=== BDO ===
In September 2014, Koltsov reached the semi-finals of the WDF Europe Cup beating Jeffrey Van Egdom, Remco van Eijden, Thomas Junghans, Daniel Larsson and Ross Montgomery along the way before losing to Darius Labanauskas 6–3. He also reached the last 16 of the Romanian Open.

=== PDC ===
Koltsov won the Russian Qualifying Event for the 2015 PDC World Championship and beat Haruki Muramatsu of Japan 4–2 in legs in the preliminary round. He squared his first round match with Kevin Painter at 1–1 in sets, but could not win another leg after this to be defeated 3–1. He teamed up with Aleksei Kadochnikov to represent Russia at the World Cup of Darts and they lost 5–1 to Australia in the first round. Koltsov's bid to reach the 2016 World Championship was ended at the semi-final stage by Aleksandr Oreshkin. He dominated the Eurasian Darts Tour in 2016 by winning four and losing in one final of the six events staged. Kolstov and Oreshkin were defeated 5–3 by the Netherlands in the opening round of the World Cup, with world number one Michael van Gerwen praising Kolstov's play afterwards.

He won the Russian qualifier for the 2017 World Championship, but lost 2–1 to Dragutin Horvat in the preliminary round. Kolstov entered Q School in a bid to earn a PDC Tour Card. He reached the last 16 on day two, but this was not enough to earn him a place on the tour. Koltsov and Aleksandr Oreshkin met Australia in the second round of the World Cup after seeing off Hong Kong 5–3 in the first round. Oreshkin beat Kyle Anderson 4–2, but Koltsov failed to win against Simon Whitlock meaning a doubles match was required to settle the tie. Russia easily won 4–0 to make it through to the quarter-finals for the first time, where they could only pick up one leg in their singles defeats to the Welsh pair of Gerwyn Price and Mark Webster.

Koltsov won a PDC Tour Card for the first time at European Qualifying School on 17 February 2021.

== World Championship results ==
=== PDC ===
- 2015: First round (lost to Kevin Painter 1–3)
- 2017: Preliminary round (lost to Dragutin Horvat 1–2)
- 2019: First round (lost to Chris Dobey 0–3)
- 2020: First round (lost to Ritchie Edhouse 1–3)
- 2022: Second round (lost to Dirk van Duijvenbode 2–3)

== Performance timeline ==
BDO

Tournament	2013	2014
BDO World Championship	DNP	DNQ
Winmau World Masters	2R	DNP

PDC

Tournament	2015	2016	2017	2018	2019	2020	2021	2022
PDC World Championship	1R	DNQ	PR	DNQ	1R	1R	DNQ	2R
UK Open	DNP			DNQ	DNP	1R	2R	WD
Non-major televised events
PDC World Cup of Darts	1R	1R	QF	1R	1R	1R	1R	DNP
Career statistics
Year-end ranking	120	167	178	133	96	158	119	

Performance timeline legend
DNP	Did not play in the event	#R	lost in the early rounds of the tournament (RR = Round robin)	QF	lost in the quarter-finals
SF	lost in the semi-finals	F	lost in the final	W	won the tournament
