= Aleksandr Oreshkin =

Russian darts player (born 1961)

Personal information
- Full name: Aleksandr Lvovich Oreshkin
- Nickname: "The Nut"
- Born: 15 July 1961 (age 65) Russian SFSR
- Home town: Saint Petersburg, Russia

Sport
- Sport: Darts
- Playing since: 2010
- Darts: 18 Gram Shot Darts Siganture
- Laterality: Left-handed
- Walk-on music: "Rasputin" by Boney M.

Organisation (see split in darts)
- BDO: 2012–2015
- PDC: 2015–2019

PDC premier events – best performances
- World Championship: Last 64: 2016

Other tournament wins
- Years
PDC World Russia Qualifying Event	2015, 2017

Aleksandr Lvovich Oreshkin (Russian: Александр Львович Орешкин; born 15 July 1961) is a Russian former professional darts player who played in Professional Darts Corporation (PDC) events.

== Career ==
Oreshkin qualified for the 2016 PDC World Darts Championship after defeating Anton Kolesov in the final of the Russian Qualifier. He played against Singaporean Paul Lim in the preliminary round, winning in a sudden-death leg to qualify for a first-round match against 14th seed Mervyn King. Oreshkin won the first two sets before King took nine of the next 12 legs to win 3–2. Oreshkin partnered Boris Koltsov at the World Cup of Darts and they lost 5–3 to the Netherlands in the first round.

Oreshkin and Koltsov met Australia in the second round of the 2017 World Cup after defeating Hong Kong 5–3 in the first round. Oreshkin beat Kyle Anderson 4–2, but Koltsov failed to win against Simon Whitlock, meaning a doubles match was required to settle the tie. Russia easily won 4–0 to advance to the quarter-finals for the first time, where they could only pick up one leg in their singles defeats to the Welsh pair of Gerwyn Price and Mark Webster. After losing 2–0 to Kevin Münch of Germany in the preliminary round of the 2018 World Championship, he qualified for the World Cup again, but lost with Koltsov to Spain in the first round. He failed to qualify for the 2019 World Championship.

Oreshkin quit the PDC in January 2019.

== World Championship results ==
=== PDC ===
- 2016: First round (lost to Mervyn King 2–3)
- 2018: Preliminary round (lost to Kevin Münch 0–2)

== Performance timeline ==
PDC

Tournament	2016	2017	2018	2019
PDC World Championship	1R	DNQ	PR	DNQ
Non-major televised events
PDC World Cup of Darts	1R	QF	1R	DNQ
