= 2016 PDC World Cup of Darts =

Tournament information
- Dates: 2–5 June 2016
- Venue: Eissporthalle
- Location: Frankfurt
- Country: Germany
- Organisation(s): PDC
- Format: Legs
- Prize fund: £250,000
- Winner's share: £50,000
- High checkout: 170 (England) Adrian Lewis (semi-final)

Champion(s)
- England (Phil Taylor and Adrian Lewis)

The 2016 PDC World Cup of Darts, known as the 2016 Betway World Cup of Darts for sponsorship reasons, was the sixth edition of the PDC World Cup of Darts. It took place between 2–5 June 2016 at the Eissporthalle in Frankfurt, Germany.

The England pairing of Phil Taylor and Adrian Lewis retained their title after beating the Netherlands pairing of Michael van Gerwen and Raymond van Barneveld 3–2 in the final.

== Format ==
The tournament remained at 32 teams this year, but unlike recent years, only the top 8 teams are seeded, with the remaining 24 teams being unseeded in the first round. Like last year, there are no groups in 2016 with the tournament being a straight knockout.

First round: Best of nine legs doubles.
Second round, quarter and semi-finals: Two best of seven legs singles matches. If the scores are tied a best of seven legs doubles match will settle the match.
Final: Three points needed to win the title. Two best of seven legs singles matches are played followed by a best of seven doubles match. If necessary, one or two best of seven legs singles matches in reverse order are played to determine the champion.

== Prize money ==
Prize money remained at £250,000 as it was at last year's tournament. The prize money was per team:

Position (no. of teams)		Prize money (Total: £250,000)
Winners	(1)	£50,000
Runners-Up	(1)	£26,000
Semi-finalists	(2)	£15,000
Quarter-finalists	(4)	£10,000
Last 16 (second round)	(8)	£7,000
Last 32 (first round)	(16)	£3,000

== Teams and seeding ==
In a change to the seeding system used in recent PDC World Cup of Darts tournaments, only the top 8 countries were seeded, with the remaining 24 teams being unseeded. The only change in countries saw Greece make their debut, in place of India.

The ranking of the seeded nations was confirmed on 23 May 2016.

Seeded nations

Rank	Country	Entered players
1	England	Phil Taylor and Adrian Lewis
2	Scotland	Gary Anderson and Robert Thornton
3	Netherlands	Michael van Gerwen and Raymond van Barneveld
4	Northern Ireland	Brendan Dolan and Daryl Gurney
5	Wales	Mark Webster and Gerwyn Price
6	Australia	Simon Whitlock and Kyle Anderson
7	Belgium	Kim Huybrechts and Ronny Huybrechts
8	Austria	Mensur Suljović and Rowby-John Rodriguez

Unseeded nations (alphabetic order)

Country	Entered players
Canada	John Part and Ken MacNeil
China	Yuanjun Liu and Wenge Xie
Czech Republic	Michal Kočík and Pavel Drtíl
Denmark	Per Laursen and Daniel Jensen
Finland	Kim Viljanen and Marko Kantele
Germany	Max Hopp and Jyhan Artut
Gibraltar	Dyson Parody and Manuel Vilerio
Greece	John Michael and Ioannis Selachoglou
Hong Kong	Royden Lam and Scott MacKenzie
Hungary	Nándor Bezzeg and Patrik Kovács
Ireland	William O'Connor and Mick McGowan
Italy	Daniele Petri and Michel Furlani
Japan	Keita Ono and Haruki Muramatsu
New Zealand	Warren Parry and Cody Harris
Norway	Robert Wagner and Cor Dekker
Philippines	Gilbert Ulang and Alex Tagarao
Poland	Krzysztof Ratajski and Mariusz Paul
Russia	Aleksandr Oreshkin and Boris Koltsov
Singapore	Paul Lim and Harith Lim
South Africa	Devon Petersen and Graham Filby
Spain	Cristo Reyes and Antonio Alcinas
Sweden	Magnus Caris and Daniel Larsson
Thailand	Thanawat Yong and Attapol Eupakaree
United States	Darin Young and Larry Butler

== Results ==
=== Draw ===
First round (best of 9 legs); 2–3 June
1	England 90.99	5
Spain 95.68	4
Czech Republic 77.06	3
China 80.81	5
8	Austria 85.40	5
Italy 76.93	0
South Africa 75.22	1
Singapore 81.28	5
5	Wales 84.52	5
Finland 77.17	1
Greece 76.96	2
Canada 81.85	5
4	Northern Ireland 85.80	5
Japan 79.98	2
Ireland 82.09	5
Hong Kong 79.40	4
2	Scotland 93.50	5
New Zealand 90.80	3
Norway 76.36	5
Gibraltar 71.49	2
7	Belgium 91.78	5
Poland 79.44	1
Hungary 72.51	5
Thailand 69.51	3
6	Australia 85.40	5
Germany 80.24	3
Denmark 84.67	5
Sweden 79.90	2
3	Netherlands 82.52	5
Russia 80.01	3
United States 72.35	3
Philippines 77.36	5

Second round (best of 3 matches); 4 June
1	England 85.49	4	4	2
China 72.82	0	0	0
8	Austria 98.84	4	4	2
Singapore 83.88	2	2	0
5	Wales 86.52	2	4	2	1
Canada 90.08	4	0	4	2
4	Northern Ireland 83.47	4	4	2
Ireland 76.36	1	2	0
2	Scotland 87.18	4	4	2
Norway 79.39	3	1	0
7	Belgium 98.77	4	4	2
Hungary 85.43	1	1	0
6	Australia 89.34	4	2	4	2
Denmark 76.48	3	4	0	1
3	Netherlands 99.37	4	4	2
Philippines 85.95	2	2	0

Quarter-finals (best of 3 matches); 5 June
1	England 101.89	4	4	2
8	Austria 97.95	0	1	0
Canada 78.29	4	0	1	1
4	Northern Ireland 83.29	3	4	4	2
2	Scotland 93.93	2	4	2	1
7	Belgium 93.20	4	1	4	2
6	Australia 95.29	1	4	3	1
3	Netherlands 99.31	4	3	4	2

Semi-finals (best of 3 matches); 5 June
1	England 96.47	4	4	2
4	Northern Ireland 88.61	0	1	0
7	Belgium 94.65	1	2	0
3	Netherlands 100.66	4	4	2

Final (best of 5 matches); 5 June
1	England 98.19	4	3	2	4	4	3
3	Netherlands 94.09	3	4	4	1	1	2

=== Second round ===
Two best of seven legs singles matches. If the scores were tied, a best of seven legs doubles match will settle the match.

England (1)	China	Score
Phil Taylor 81.24	Yuanjun Liu 72.13	4–0
Adrian Lewis 89.73	Wenge Xie 73.50	4–0
Final result		2–0

Austria (8)	Singapore	Score
Mensur Suljović 101.38	Paul Lim 84.91	4–2
Rowby-John Rodriguez 96.29	Harith Lim 82.84	4–2
Final result		2–0

Wales (5)	Canada	Score
Mark Webster 79.75	John Part 81.19	2–4
Gerwyn Price 95.43	Ken MacNeil 96.70	4–0
Webster & Price 84.38	Part & MacNeil 92.34	2–4
Final result		1–2

Northern Ireland (4)	Ireland	Score
Daryl Gurney 86.41	William O'Connor 75.69	4–1
Brendan Dolan 80.52	Mick McGowan 76.91	4–2
Final result		2–0

Scotland (2)	Norway	Score
Gary Anderson 88.74	Cor Dekker 80.33	4–3
Robert Thornton 85.00	Robert Wagner 78.07	4–1
Final result		2–0

Belgium (7)	Hungary	Score
Kim Huybrechts 100.71	Nándor Bezzeg 88.43	4–1
Ronny Huybrechts 96.82	Patrik Kovács 82.42	4–1
Final result		2–0

Australia (6)	Denmark	Score
Simon Whitlock 89.73	Daniel Jensen 73.72	4–3
Kyle Anderson 84.36	Per Laursen 82.72	2–4
Whitlock & Anderson 93.94	Jensen & Laursen 72.40	4–0
Final result		2–1

Netherlands (3)	Philippines	Score
Michael van Gerwen 96.99	Gilbert Ulang 84.40	4–2
Raymond van Barneveld 101.75	Alex Tagarao 87.49	4–2
Final result		2–0

=== Quarter-finals ===
Two best of seven legs singles matches. If the scores were tied, a best of seven legs doubles match will settle the match.

England (1)	Austria (8)	Score
Phil Taylor 100.20	Mensur Suljović 92.15	4–0
Adrian Lewis 103.24	Rowby-John Rodriguez 102.59	4–1
Final result		2–0

Canada	Northern Ireland (4)	Score
John Part 81.47	Brendan Dolan 79.46	4–3
Ken MacNeil 73.17	Daryl Gurney 82.36	0–4
Part & MacNeil 77.93	Dolan & Gurney 88.06	1–4
Final result		1–2

Scotland (2)	Belgium (7)	Score
Gary Anderson 96.52	Kim Huybrechts 96.03	2–4
Robert Thornton 89.89	Ronny Huybrechts 86.04	4–1
Anderson & Thornton 94.70	K. Huybrechts & R. Huybrechts 96.34	2–4
Final result		1–2

Australia (6)	Netherlands (3)	Score
Simon Whitlock 94.15	Michael van Gerwen 98.49	1–4
Kyle Anderson 94.62	Raymond van Barneveld 91.44	4–3
Whitlock & Anderson 96.77	van Gerwen & van Barneveld 107.77	3–4
Final result		1–2

=== Semi-finals ===
Two best of seven legs singles matches. If the scores were tied, a best of seven legs doubles match will settle the match.

England (1)	Northern Ireland (4)	Score
Phil Taylor 96.97	Brendan Dolan 86.35	4–0
Adrian Lewis 95.96	Daryl Gurney 90.41	4–1
Final result		2–0

Belgium (7)	Netherlands (3)	Score
Ronny Huybrechts 86.78	Michael van Gerwen 102.70	1–4
Kim Huybrechts 101.21	Raymond van Barneveld 98.61	2–4
Final result		0–2

=== Final ===
Three match wins were needed to win the title. Two best of seven legs singles matches followed by a best of seven doubles match. If necessary, one or two best of seven legs reverse singles matches are played to determine the champion.

England (1)	Netherlands (3)	Score
Phil Taylor 102.94	Michael van Gerwen 81.97	4–3
Adrian Lewis 103.62	Raymond van Barneveld 107.83	3–4
Taylor & Lewis 90.62	van Gerwen & van Barneveld 95.08	2–4
Phil Taylor 105.12	Raymond van Barneveld 105.45	4–1
Adrian Lewis 86.10	Michael van Gerwen 79.25	4–1
Final result		3–2
