= František Humpula =

Czech darts player

Personal information
- Born: 28 January 1994 (age 32) Krnov, Czech Republic
- Home town: Krnov, Czech Republic

Sport
- Sport: Darts
- Playing since: 2009
- Darts: 22g Target
- Laterality: Right-handed
- Walk-on music: "Never Let Me Down Again" by Depeche Mode

Organisation (see split in darts)
- BDO: 2016–2018
- PDC: 2017–2019
- WDF: 2016–2018

WDF major events – best performances
- World Masters: Last 128: 2016

Other tournament wins
- Years
Czech Ch'ship	2016, 2017
Czech Youth Ch'ship (soft-tip)	2011, 2012

František Humpula (born 28 January 1994) is a Czech professional soft-tip and steel-tip darts player who played in World Darts Federation (WDF) and Professional Darts Corporation (PDC) events. He has represented his country at the PDC World Cup of Darts and WDF Europe Cup.

== Career ==
His beginnings in darts date back to the summer of 2009, when at the age of 15, his father took him to the playing field of the Krnov Darts League. In 2011, he went to try his luck at a tournament outside Krnov for the first time. He immediately mastered the junior category and became the soft-tip Youth Champion of the Czech Republic. Because he continued to struggle with a lack of finances, he only played tournaments in Krnov and the surrounding area. He made his way among the republic's elite until again at the Czech Championship for the defense of the junior title, which he completely succeeded in.

In 2016, he won the Czech Championship on a steel-tip dartboard. At the same time, he received a nomination to participate in the 2016 Winmau World Masters. In the first round match, he beat Philipp Brezina by 3–0 in legs. In the second round match, he lost to Greg Moss by 1–3 in legs. In 2017, he managed to defend the title of Champion of the Czech Republic on steel-tip boards, in singles and pairs competition.

Another significant milestone in his career was the victory in the Qualifying for the 2017 PDC World Cup of Darts. Humpula went to this tournament alongside Karel Sedláček. In the first round match they faced rivals from the Netherlands (Raymond van Barneveld and Michael van Gerwen). The team lost 1–5 in legs. At the beginning of 2018, Humpula took part in the PDC Q-School. At the second tournament, he advanced to the finals, where he lost to Mario Robbe only by 4–5 in legs and lost his chance for a personal PDC Tour Card.

In 2018, he was selected by the national federation to participate in the 2018 WDF Europe Cup. In singles competition, he lost in the first round match to Ulf Ceder by 2–4 in legs. In pairs and team competition, he was eliminated with his partners in the first phases. In 2019, he participated in the qualifiers for the 2019 Czech Darts Open but lost in the third round.

== Performance timeline ==
Tournament	2016	2017
WDF Ranked televised events
World Masters	2R	DNQ
PDC Non-ranked televised events
World Cup of Darts	DNQ	1R
