= Ioannis Selachoglou =

Greek darts player (born 1976)

Personal information
- Born: April 28, 1976 (age 50) Berlin, Germany

Sport
- Sport: Darts
- Playing since: 2011
- Darts: 22g Winmau
- Laterality: Right-handed

Organisation (see split in darts)
- BDO: 2011–2016
- PDC: 2016–2017

WDF major events – best performances
- World Masters: Last 144: 2014

Ioannis Selachoglou (born 28 April 1976) is a Greek darts player who plays in Professional Darts Corporation events.

== Darts Career ==
In 2016, he made his TV debut in the 2016 PDC World Cup of Darts, where he partnered John Michael, but lost in the first round to the Canada pair of John Part and Ken MacNeil. The following year, they returned and after defeating Thailand in the first round, they lost to Belgium in round two, where Selachoglou lost to Kim Huybrechts. He is the manager of Martin Schindler.
