= 2010 World Grand Prix (darts) =

2010 Bodog.com World Grand Prix

Tournament information
- Dates: 4–10 October 2010
- Venue: Citywest Hotel
- Location: Dublin, Ireland
- Organisation(s): Professional Darts Corporation (PDC)
- Format: Sets "double in, double out" Final – best of 11
- Prize fund: £350,000
- Winner's share: £100,000
- High checkout: 170; Simon Whitlock; Raymond van Barneveld; Phil Taylor

Champion(s)
- James Wade (ENG)

The 2010 Bodog.com World Grand Prix was the thirteenth staging of the World Grand Prix. It was played from 4 to 10 October 2010 at the Citywest Hotel in Dublin, Ireland.

James Wade won his second World Grand Prix title, defeating Adrian Lewis in the final. Defending champion Phil Taylor was aiming to win his tenth World Grand Prix, but was beaten by Lewis in the semi-finals.

== Prize money ==
The total prize fund was £350,000. This was the same as the 2009 tournament.

The following is the breakdown of the fund:

Position (num. of players)		Prize money (Total: £350,000)
Winner	(1)	£100,000
Runner-Up	(1)	£40,000
Semi-finalists	(2)	£20,000
Quarter-finalists	(4)	£12,500
Second round losers	(8)	£7,000
First round losers	(16)	£4,000

== Qualification ==
The field of 32 players was mostly made up from the top 16 in the PDC Order of Merit on September 20, following the two Players Championships in Nuland, Netherlands. The top 8 from these rankings were also the seeded players. The remaining 16 places went to the top 12 non-qualified players from the Players Championship Order of Merit, and then to the top 4 non-qualified residents of the Republic of Ireland and Northern Ireland from the 2010 Players Championship Order of Merit who have competed in at least six Players Championship events.

PDC Top 16
1. (England) Phil Taylor (semi-finals)
2. (Netherlands) Raymond van Barneveld (semi-finals)
3. (England) James Wade (winner)
4. (England) Mervyn King (first round)
5. (England) Terry Jenkins (second round)
6. (Australia) Simon Whitlock (second round)
7. (England) Colin Lloyd (first round)
8. (England) Ronnie Baxter (first round)
9. (England) Adrian Lewis (runner-up)
10. (England) Mark Walsh (second round)
11. (England) Andy Hamilton (quarter-finals)
12. (England) Colin Osborne (second round)
13. (Scotland) Gary Anderson (quarter-finals)
14. (England) Wayne Jones (quarter-finals)
15. (Australia) Paul Nicholson (first round)
16. (England) Kevin Painter (second round)

PDPA Players Championship qualifiers
1. (Netherlands) Vincent van der Voort (first round)
2. (England) Jamie Caven (first round)
3. (England) Denis Ovens (first round)
4. (England) Wes Newton (second round)
5. (England) Andy Smith (second round)
6. (England) Mark Dudbridge (first round)
7. (Netherlands) Co Stompé (first round)
8. (England) Alan Tabern (first round)
9. (Wales) Barrie Bates (quarter-finals)
10. (England) Steve Farmer (first round)
11. (England) Steve Brown (second round)
12. (England) Dennis Priestley (first round)

Irish qualifiers
1. (Northern Ireland) Brendan Dolan (first round)
2. (Republic of Ireland) Mick McGowan (first round)
3. (Republic of Ireland) William O'Connor (first round)
4. (Northern Ireland) John MaGowan (first round)

== Television coverage and sponsorship ==
The whole tournament was screened by Sky Sports in high definition.

Bodog sponsored the tournament for the first time.

== Draw ==
First round (best of 3 sets); 4–5 October
1	(England) Phil Taylor 102.48	2
(Northern Ireland) Brendan Dolan 83.48	0
(England) Andy Smith 82.46	2
(England) Jamie Caven 80.09	1
8	(England) Ronnie Baxter 83.67	1
(Scotland) Gary Anderson 89.29	2
(England) Kevin Painter 77.55	2
(England) Mark Dudbridge 78.81	1
5	(England) Terry Jenkins 83.46	2
(Netherlands) Vincent van der Voort 78.08	0
(England) Adrian Lewis 82.59	2
(England) Alan Tabern 82.29	1
4	(England) Mervyn King 89.18	1
(England) Wayne Jones 88.47	2
(England) Steve Brown 76.06	2
(England) Steve Farmer 83.25	1
2	(Netherlands) Raymond van Barneveld 78.16	2
(Northern Ireland) John MaGowan 77.93	0
(England) Denis Ovens 85.37	0
(England) Mark Walsh 92.56	2
7	(England) Colin Lloyd 72.97	0
(England) Wes Newton 88.75	2
(Republic of Ireland) William O'Connor 66.83	0
(Wales) Barrie Bates 76.05	2
6	(Australia) Simon Whitlock 89.54	2
(Australia) Paul Nicholson 78.00	0
(England) Dennis Priestley 79.75	0
(England) Andy Hamilton 88.36	2
3	(England) James Wade 83.00	2
(Republic of Ireland) Mick McGowan 67.52	0
(England) Colin Osborne 76.90	2
(Netherlands) Co Stompé 70.69	1

Second round (best of 5 sets); 6–7 October
1	(England) Phil Taylor 101.75	3
(England) Andy Smith 93.72	0
(Scotland) Gary Anderson 89.89	3
(England) Kevin Painter 81.27	2
5	(England) Terry Jenkins 82.67	2
(England) Adrian Lewis 78.65	3
(England) Wayne Jones 84.38	3
(England) Steve Brown 77.19	0
2	(Netherlands) Raymond van Barneveld 91.20	3
(England) Mark Walsh 92.09	1
(England) Wes Newton 83.20	2
(Wales) Barrie Bates 81.65	3
6	(Australia) Simon Whitlock 91.67	2
(England) Andy Hamilton 91.55	3
3	(England) James Wade 83.44	3
(England) Colin Osborne 87.00	1

Quarter-finals (best of 7 sets); 8 October
1	(England) Phil Taylor 99.82	4
(Scotland) Gary Anderson 95.00	3
(England) Adrian Lewis 84.14	4
(England) Wayne Jones 87.04	1
2	(Netherlands) Raymond van Barneveld 87.61	4
(Wales) Barrie Bates 79.21	1
(England) Andy Hamilton 85.29	1
3	(England) James Wade 82.29	4

Semi-finals (best of 9 sets); 9 October
1	(England) Phil Taylor 92.88	4
(England) Adrian Lewis 91.76	5
2	(Netherlands) Raymond van Barneveld 85.95	1
3	(England) James Wade 87.95	5

Final (best of 11 sets); 10 October
(England) Adrian Lewis 89.33	3
3	(England) James Wade 88.76	6

== Statistics ==
Player	Played	Sets Won	Sets Lost	Legs Won	Legs Lost	LWAT	100+	140+	180s	High checkout	3-dart average
(England) James Wade	5	20	6	67	39	27	148	72	11	154	85.09
(England) Adrian Lewis	5	17	14	61	63	27	168	76	33	161	85.30
(Netherlands) Raymond van Barneveld	4	10	7	38	31	18	84	33	8	170	85.73
(England) Phil Taylor	4	13	8	51	32	21	126	41	17	170	99.23
(England) Wayne Jones	3	6	5	26	22	9	60	37	6	124	86.63
(England) Andy Hamilton	3	6	6	22	26	10	46	39	6	154	88.40
(Wales) Barrie Bates	3	6	6	24	23	9	57	24	6	104	78.97
(Scotland) Gary Anderson	3	8	7	31	31	12	72	38	22	120	91.39
(England) Wes Newton	2	4	3	15	13	7	32	22	3	91	85.98
(England) Colin Osborne	2	3	1	11	17	6	37	15	4	100	81.95
(Australia) Simon Whitlock	2	4	3	17	11	6	34	22	5	170	90.61
(England) Mark Walsh	2	3	3	13	11	6	46	19	1	135	92.33
(England) Kevin Painter	2	4	4	16	15	6	38	12	4	147	79.41
(England) Andy Smith	2	2	4	9	15	1	28	17	4	120	88.09
(England) Terry Jenkins	2	4	3	16	11	8	46	23	4	158	83.07
(England) Steve Brown	2	2	4	12	15	3	29	19	4	74	76.63
(Republic of Ireland) William O'Connor	1	0	2	1	6	0	5	3	0	32	66.83
(Australia) Paul Nicholson	1	0	2	2	6	1	10	3	1	72	78.00
(Northern Ireland) John MaGowan	1	0	2	1	6	1	9	3	0	36	77.93
(Republic of Ireland) Mick McGowan	1	0	2	2	6	1	11	1	0	55	67.52
(England) Colin Lloyd	1	0	2	1	6	0	6	6	0	40	72.97
(Netherlands) Co Stompe	1	1	2	6	6	3	9	7	3	110	70.69
(England) Denis Ovens	1	0	2	2	6	1	12	7	0	60	85.37
(England) Dennis Priestley	1	0	2	3	6	1	9	7	2	100	79.75
(England) Mervyn King	1	1	2	6	8	2	13	11	2	118	89.18
(England) Mark Dudbridge	1	1	2	5	8	0	15	4	0	100	78.81
(Northern Ireland) Brendan Dolan	1	0	2	0	6	0	13	3	0	—	83.48
(England) Ronnie Baxter	1	1	2	6	8	2	14	13	2	130	83.67
(England) Alan Tabern	1	1	2	4	6	2	12	4	2	56	82.29
(England) Steve Farmer	1	1	2	6	8	1	21	8	2	68	83.25
(Netherlands) Vincent van der Voort	1	0	2	3	6	1	10	4	1	56	78.08
(England) Jamie Caven	1	1	2	6	7	1	16	7	2	58	80.09
