= 2014 European Darts Grand Prix =

Tournament information
- Dates: 5–7 September 2014
- Venue: Glaspalast
- Location: Sindelfingen
- Country: Germany
- Organisation(s): PDC
- Format: Legs
- Prize fund: £100,000
- Winner's share: £20,000
- High checkout: 170 (England) Stephen Bunting

Champion(s)
- (England) Mervyn King

The 2014 European Darts Grand Prix was the seventh of eight PDC European Tour events on the 2014 PDC Pro Tour. The tournament took place at the Glaspalast in Sindelfingen, Germany, between 5–7 September 2014. It featured a field of 48 players and £100,000 in prize money, with £20,000 going to the winner.

Mervyn King won his first European Tour event by beating Michael Smith 6–5 in the final.

== Prize money ==
| Stage (num. of players) | | Prize money |
|---|---|---|
| Winner | (1) | £20,000 |
| Runner-up | (1) | £8,000 |
| Semi-finalists | (2) | £4,000 |
| Quarter-finalists | (4) | £3,000 |
| Third round losers | (8) | £2,000 |
| Second round losers | (16) | £1,250 |
| First round losers | (16) | £1,000 |
| Total | £100,000 | |

== Qualification and format ==
The top 16 players from the PDC ProTour Order of Merit on 30 June 2014 automatically qualified for the event. The remaining 32 places went to players from three qualifying events - 20 from the UK Qualifier (held in Coventry on 4 July), eight from the European Qualifier and four from the Host Nation Qualifier (both held at the venue the day before the event started). All seeds receive a bye into the second round.

The following players took part in the tournament:

Top 16
1. (Scotland) Gary Anderson (third round)
2. (Northern Ireland) Brendan Dolan (second round)
3. (Scotland) Robert Thornton (quarter-finals)
4. (England) Dave Chisnall (quarter-finals)
5. (Scotland) Peter Wright (second round)
6. (England) Ian White (second round)
7. (Belgium) Kim Huybrechts (third round)
8. (England) Steve Beaton (third round)
9. (England) Adrian Lewis (quarter-finals)
10. (Australia) Simon Whitlock (semi-finals)
11. (England) Mervyn King (winner)
12. (Netherlands) Vincent van der Voort (third round)
13. (England) Justin Pipe (second round)
14. (England) Jamie Caven (third round)
15. (England) Terry Jenkins (quarter-finals)
16. (England) Michael Smith (runner-up)

UK Qualifier
- (Australia) Kyle Anderson (second round)
- (England) Chris Aubrey (first round)
- (England) Stephen Bunting (semi-finals)
- (England) Matt Clark (second round)
- (England) Joe Cullen (second round)
- (England) Kevin Dowling (first round)
- (England) Ricky Evans (second round)
- (England) Andrew Gilding (second round)
- (England) Wayne Jones (first round)
- (England) Johnny Haines (first round)
- (England) Andy Hamilton (second round)
- (Scotland) John Henderson (first round)
- (England) Steve Hine (second round)
- (England) James Hubbard (first round)
- (England) Jason Lovett (first round)
- (England) Kevin McDine (second round)
- (Canada) Shaun Narain (second round)
- (England) Kevin Painter (first round)
- (England) James Wade (third round)
- (England) Darren Webster (third round)

European Qualifier
- (Netherlands) Benito van de Pas (first round)
- (Austria) Rowby-John Rodriguez (third round)
- (Netherlands) Ryan de Vreede (second round)
- (Croatia) Robert Marijanović (first round)
- (Austria) Mensur Suljović (first round)
- (Netherlands) Jelle Klaasen (first round)
- (Netherlands) Ron Meulenkamp (first round)
- (Belgium) Mike De Decker (first round)

Host Nation Qualifier
- (Germany) Michael Rosenauer (second round)
- (Germany) Max Hopp (second round)
- (Germany) Jyhan Artut (first round)
- (Germany) Sascha Goldammer (first round)

== Draw ==
First round (best of 11 legs); 5 September
RD2-seed24

Second round (best of 11 legs); 6 September

Third round (best of 11 legs); 7 September

Quarter-finals (best of 11 legs); 7 September

Semi-finals (best of 11 legs); 7 September

Final (best of 11 legs); 7 September
