= Rowby-John Rodriguez =

Austrian darts player (born 1994)

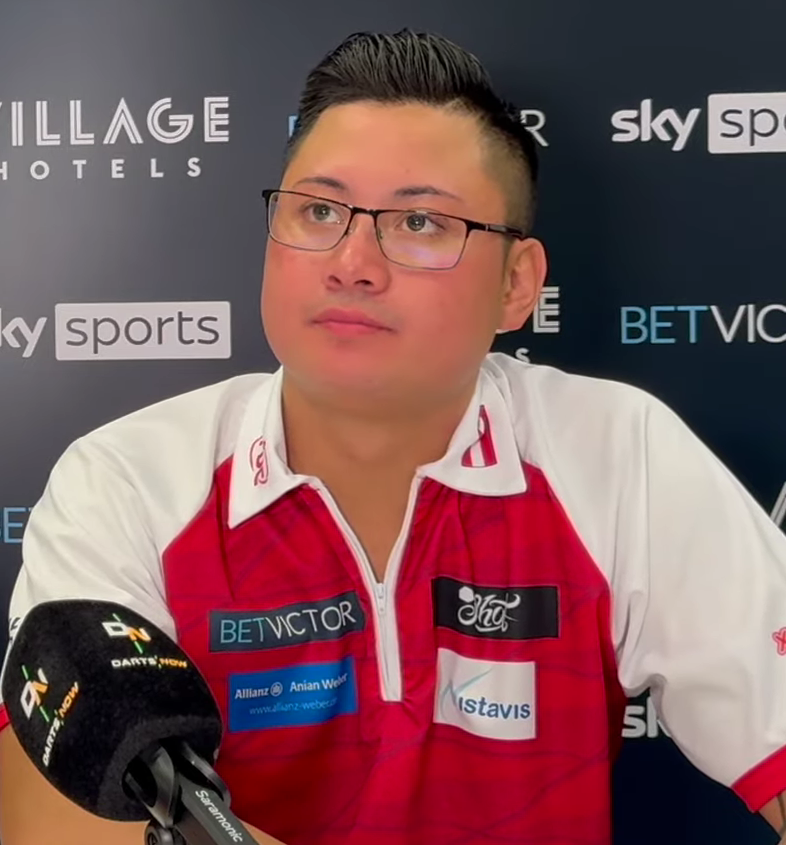
- Rodriguez in 2024

Personal information
- Nickname: "Little John"
- Born: 27 March 1994 (age 32) Vienna, Austria

Sport
- Sport: Darts
- Playing since: 2010
- Darts: 23g Shot Signature
- Laterality: Right-handed
- Walk-on music: "Vamos a la playa" by Righeira

Organisation (see split in darts)
- BDO: 2010–2013
- PDC: 2013–present (Tour Card: 2014–2020; 2022–2024)

WDF major events – best performances
- World Masters: Last 80: 2013

PDC premier events – best performances
- World Championship: Last 64: 2015, 2016, 2017, 2019, 2022
- World Matchplay: Last 16: 2022
- UK Open: Last 64: 2021, 2023, 2024
- Grand Slam: Last 16: 2021
- European Championship: Last 16: 2015, 2022
- PC Finals: Last 32: 2016

Other tournament wins
- Years
Austria National Championships	2010
Baltic Cup Open	2012
Carinthian Open	2011
PDC Challenge Tour	2013, 2021
PDC Development Tour	2015, 2018

Rowby-John Rodriguez (born 27 March 1994) is an Austrian professional darts player who competes in Professional Darts Corporation (PDC) events. Nicknamed "Little John", he was runner-up at the PDC World Cup of Darts in both 2021 and 2024, partnering Mensur Suljović for Austria. A former PDC Tour Card holder, he was the beaten finalist at the 2022 European Darts Matchplay – on the PDC European Tour – and is a two-time winner on both of the second-tier PDC circuits – the PDC Challenge Tour and the PDC Development Tour.

== Career ==
In 2010, as a 16-year-old, Rodriguez won the Austrian National Championship, beating Franz Thaler 5–0 in the final.

At 2014's Q-School Rodriguez was one win away from winning a card on Day 2 but lost to Gerwyn Price 5–3. However, after all four events had been played Rodriguez had done enough to finish ninth on the Q–School Order of Merit and earn a two-year tour card. His first PDC major was the UK Open where he was knocked out 5–1 by Tony Randall in the first round.

In May, Rodriguez reached the final of the PDC World Youth Championship where he lost 6–4 to Keegan Brown at the O2 Arena in London as part of the Premier League finals night. Reaching the final secured him a place in the 2014 Grand Slam of Darts. Rodriguez was now Austria's number two player behind Mensur Suljović and they teamed up at the World Cup of Darts, but lost both their singles matches in the second round against the Belgium brothers of Kim and Ronny Huybrechts. Rodriguez reached the quarter-finals of a Pro Tour event for the first time at the 14th Players Championship defeating the likes of Gary Anderson, Paul Nicholson and Jamie Caven, before losing 6–1 to Ian White. His play throughout the year earned him a debut in the European Championship where he lost 6–2 to Robert Thornton in the opening round. At the Grand Slam, Rodriguez beat world number three Adrian Lewis 5–2 in his opening group game before losing 5–1 to Dave Chisnall. He went into his final group game knowing a win over Brown would see him qualify for the last 16 and, despite coming back from 3–0 down to level at 3–3, he lost 5–3.

=== 2015 season ===
Rodriguez made his debut at the 2015 World Championship after he qualified through the Pro Tour Order of Merit. However, he ran into an in-form Raymond van Barneveld who hit finishes of 167 and 170 as he restricted Rodriguez to two legs during the match in a 3–0 defeat. Rodriguez averaged 79.22 which was over 20 points lower than his opponent's, but he still broke into the top 64 on the Order of Merit for the first time after the tournament concluded as he was ranked world number 58. He won the opening Development Tour event of the year by beating Jamie Lewis 4–1 in the final. Rodriguez and Suljović were eliminated in the last 16 of the World Cup for the second consecutive year, this time to Germany. From the last 32 onwards he knocked out Kim Huybrechts, Wayne Jones and Mensur Suljović at the 14th Players Championship to play in his first PDC Pro Tour semi-final, where he lost 6–2 against Jelle Klaasen. A 6–4 win over Christian Kist saw Rodriguez make the second round of the European Championship in which he could only average 73.43 against John Henderson in a 10–2 defeat. After losing 5–3 to Robbie Green and beating Martin Phillips 5–2 at the Grand Slam, Rodriguez needed a win over Phil Taylor to qualify for the last 16, but he lost 5–2.

=== 2016 season ===
Rodriguez hit the first 170 finish of the 2016 World Championship, but lost each of the three sets played against Dave Chisnall in the first round by deciding legs. He reached the quarter-finals of the first UK Open Qualifier, but was beaten 6–1 by Adrian Lewis and he lost 6–2 to Lee Evans in the second round of the main event. Rodriguez was defeated in the final of three Development Tour events in 2016.

Rodriguez and Mensur Suljović eliminated Italy and Singapore to ensure Austria played in their first World Cup quarter-final, where Suljović was whitewashed by Phil Taylor and Rodriguez lost 4–1 to Adrian Lewis. A couple of quarter-finals out of the 20 Players Championship events qualified him for the Finals and he beat Ronny Huybrechts 6–4, before being thrashed 6–0 by Joe Cullen in the second round.

=== 2017 season ===
Rodriguez squared his first round match with Dave Chisnall at the 2017 World Championship at two sets apiece, but lost all three legs of the decider. Austria played England in the quarter-finals of the 2017 World Cup for the second successive year. Mensur Suljović thrashed Adrian Lewis 4–0 and Rodriguez lost 4–1 to Chisnall, before Austria were defeated 4–2 in the decisive doubles match.

On the last weekend of the PDC Development Tour Rodriguez reached the final twice and won one of them 5:4 against Luke Humphries. This was enough to qualify for the 2017 PDC World Youth Championship, but after winning only one match there, Rodriguez missed out on qualifying for the other Majors, including the 2018 PDC World Darts Championship. However, he was able to defend his Tour Card via the rankings.

=== 2018–2020: Downturn in form, loses his Tour Card ===
His form improved a little in 2018, when he qualified three times for the European Tour, but only won one match in the 2018 Dutch Darts Championship, won the fifth tournament on the PDC Development Tour and reached the final of the eleventh tournament.

In October he defeated his brother Rusty-Jake Rodriguez in the final of the South East European Qualifier for the 2019 PDC World Darts Championship. Before that, however, he was eliminated in the group stage of the 2019 PDC World Youth Championship. After reaching the last 16 of the Players Championships and the third round several times, he qualified for the 2019 Players Championship Finals but lost in round one to Danny Noppert.

In the 2019 PDC World Darts Championship Rodriguez met Ricky Evans in round one. Rodriguez won 3–1 and thus won a match for the first time at a World Championship. In the second round, he then lost to Cristo Reyes 3–2, missing match darts.

Having retained his Tour card once again, Rodriguez reached the last 16 of Players Championship 6. However he lost in the first round once again at 2019 UK Open.

Rodriguez reached another round of 16 on the tour at the 2019 Dutch Darts Masters, where he lost to Mervyn King in a last-leg decider. He even reached the quarter-finals of the 2019 Austrian Darts Championship after defeating Josh Payne, Daryl Gurney and Mike De Decker before losing 5-6 to Peter Wright.

Thanks to these successes, Rodriguez qualified for the 2020 PDC World Darts Championship via the PDC Pro Tour Order of Merit, but was unable to win a set against Philippine qualifier Noel Malicdem.

At the 2020 UK Open Rodriguez didn't win a match for the fourth time. During the break forced by the COVID-19 pandemic, Rodriguez took part in the first PDC Home Tour. Rodriguez also returned to the 2020 PDC World Cup of Darts after a two-year break and reached the quarter-finals with Mensur Suljović for the third time. The pair started the tournament with a 5-2 win over the USA, after which they beat José de Sousa and José Marquês from Portugal. In the quarter-finals, again against England, Suljović first defeated Michael Smith 4–3 before he lost to Rob Cross by the same score. In the doubles England won 4–3.

However, due to his lack of success on the 2020 PDC Pro Tour, Rodriguez failed to qualify for the other majors and lost his Tour Card.

=== 2021: A year without a Tour card ===
Rodriguez qualified for the final stage at Q-School 2021, but did not do enough to win the Tour card back. However, Rodriguez still qualified for the 2021 UK Open, where he won matches for the first time. He beat Brian Raman in the first round and Kevin McDine in the second round before defeating Josh Payne 6–5 in the third round. He lost to Jonny Clayton in the fourth round.

As a call-up for Players Championship events, filling in virtue of his 2021 Challenge Tour Order of Merit ranking, Rodriguez made several round of 16 appearances, and thus qualified for the 2022 PDC World Darts Championship via the ProTour Order of Merit Ranking.

Rodriguez once again played alongside Mensur Suljović for Austria in the 2021 PDC World Cup of Darts. In the first round, the pair defeated the Philippines 5–1 before winning both their singles matches against Kim Huybrechts and Dimitri Van den Bergh from Belgium in the second round. They faced Northern Ireland in the quarter-finals and while Suljović narrowly lost to Brendan Dolan, Rodriguez beat Daryl Gurney 4–2. Suljović and Rodriguez then won 4–3 in the doubles to reach the semi-finals for the first time.

Austria faced the England team of James Wade and Dave Chisnall, Rodriguez averaged 102 in a 4–1 win in his singles match while Suljović did the same. This meant Austria reached the final for the first time. However John Henderson and Peter Wright from Scotland won 3–1 in the final.

Rodriguez qualified for the 2021 Grand Slam of Darts by virtue of being a runner-up at the 2021 World Cup, beating Chris Dobey and Stephen Bunting in the group stage to qualify for the knockout phase. In the round of 16 he was beaten by James Wade 10–2.

=== 2022–2024 ===
In the 2022 PDC World Championship Rodriguez won against Nick Kenny 3–0 in the first round, but was whitewashed by Luke Humphries 3–0 in sets in the second round, which meant he finished 65th on the Order of Merit, one place outside the top 64 required to keep his Tour Card. As a result, he had to take part in the PDC Q-School in January 2022, where he regained his Tour card via the European Q-School Order of Merit.

He then performed well in the European Tour events. He reached the quarter-finals of both the 2022 Czech Darts Open and the 2022 European Darts Grand Prix. Rodriguez made his first final at a Euro Tour tournament, defeating Danny Noppert, Gerwyn Price, Gabriel Clemens, Nathan Aspinall and Madars Razma at the 2022 European Darts Matchplay in Trier. In the final he met Luke Humphries, Rodriguez missed a match dart in the deciding leg and Humphries therefore won 8–7. Rodriguez withdrew from the next European Tour event, the 2022 Hungarian Darts Trophy, for family reasons.

At the 2022 Players Championship Finals he lost to Joe Cullen in the first round. At the 2023 PDC World Darts Championship he lost to Lourence Ilagan in the first round.

On the 2023 European Tour, he only played in three tournaments and thus only reached 75th place in the European Tour Order of Merit. He was the only Austrian to qualify for the 2023 Players Championship Finals.

In the 2024 World Cup of Darts, Rodriguez and his Austria teammate Mensur Suljović were the runners-up, reaching the final where they lost to England.

== Personal life ==
Rodriguez is of Filipino descent. His older brother, Roxy-James Rodriguez, is a former professional darts player. His younger brother, Rusty-Jake Rodriguez, is also a darts player.

== World Championship results ==
=== PDC ===
- 2015: First round (lost to Raymond van Barneveld 0–3)
- 2016: First round (lost to Dave Chisnall 0–3)
- 2017: First round (lost to Dave Chisnall 2–3)
- 2019: Second round (lost to Cristo Reyes 2–3)
- 2020: First round (lost to Noel Malicdem 0–3)
- 2022: Second round (lost to Luke Humphries 0–3)
- 2023: First round (lost to Lourence Ilagan 2–3)

== Career finals ==
=== PDC team finals: 2 ===
Outcome	No.	Year	Championship	Team	Teammate	Opponents in the final	Score (Note: (l) = score in legs, (s) = score in sets, (m) = score in matches.)
Runner-up	1.	2021	World Cup of Darts	Austria	Mensur Suljović	Scotland – Peter Wright and John Henderson	1–3 (m)
Runner-up	2.	2024	World Cup of Darts (2)	Austria	Mensur Suljović	England – Luke Humphries and Michael Smith	6–10 (l)

== Performance timeline ==
Tournament	2013	2014	2015	2016	2017	2018	2019	2020	2021	2022	2023	2024
PDC Ranked televised events
World Championship	DNP	DNQ	1R	1R	1R	DNQ	2R	1R	DNQ	2R	1R	DNQ
UK Open	DNP	1R	DNQ	2R	DNQ		1R	2R	4R	3R	4R	4R
World Matchplay	DNQ									2R	DNQ	
European Championship	DNP	1R	2R	DNQ						2R	DNQ	
Grand Slam	DNP	RR	RR	DNQ					2R	DNQ		RR
Players Championship Finals	DNP	DNQ		2R	DNQ	1R	DNQ		1R	1R	1R	DNQ
Non-ranked televised events
World Cup	DNP	2R	2R	QF	QF	DNP		QF	F	2R	RR	F
World Series Finals	NH		2R	Did not qualify								DNP
PDC World Youth Championship	2R	F	2R	QF	2R	RR	DNP					
Career statistics
Year-end ranking	NR	58	41	41	59	72	88	71	65	51	49	77

=== European Tour ===
Season	1	2	3	4	5	6	7	8	9	10	11	12	13
2014	Did not participate						EDG; 3R	EDT; DNP					
2015	GDC; DNQ	GDT; 1R	GDM; 1R	DDM; 2R	IDO; 3R	EDO; 2R	EDT; 3R	EDM; QF	EDG; 1R				
2016	DDM; 2R	GDM; DNQ	GDT; 1R	EDM; 2R	ADO; 2R	Did not qualify				GDC; 2R			
2017	GDC; DNQ	GDM; 3R	Did not qualify				ADO; 1R	EDO; DNQ	DDM; 2R	Did not qualify			
2018	EDO; DNQ	GDG; 1R	Did not qualify			DDM; 1R	Did not qualify				DDC; 2R	DNQ	
2019	Did not qualify						DDM; 3R	DDO; DNQ	CDO; 1R	ADC; QF	Did not qualify		
2020	BDC; 1R	Did not qualify											
2022	Did not qualify			ADO; 2R	EDO; 2R	CDO; QF	EDG; QF	DDC; DNQ	EDM; F	HDT; WD	DNQ		GDT; 2R
2023	Did not qualify				ADO; 1R	DDC; DNQ	BDO; DNQ	CDO; 1R	Did not qualify			HDT; 3R	GDC; DNQ

=== PDC Players Championships ===
Season	1	2	3	4	5	6	7	8	9	10	11	12	13	14	15	16	17	18	19	20	21	22	23	24	25	26	27	28	29	30	31
2011	Did not participate						VIE; Prel.	Did not participate																							
2014	BAR; 1R	BAR; 1R	DNP		WIG; 1R	WIG; 1R	WIG; 1R	WIG; 1R	CRA; 1R	CRA; 2R	COV; 1R	COV; 4R	CRA; 1R	CRA; QF	DUB; 3R	DUB; 3R	CRA; 1R	CRA; 1R	COV; 2R	COV; 3R											
2015	BAR; 2R	BAR; 1R	BAR; 2R	BAR; 3R	BAR; 1R	DNP			CRA; 2R	CRA; 1R	BAR; 1R	BAR; 1R	WIG; 1R	WIG; SF	BAR; 1R	BAR; 2R	DUB; 1R	DUB; 2R	COV; 3R	COV; 2R											
2016	BAR; 1R	BAR; 1R	BAR; 1R	BAR; 4R	BAR; 3R	DNP		COV; 1R	COV; 1R	BAR; 4R	BAR; 1R	BAR; 3R	BAR; 3R	BAR; 3R	BAR; 2R	BAR; QF	DUB; 2R	DUB; 1R	BAR; QF	BAR; 1R											
2017	BAR; 1R	BAR; 1R	DNP		MIL; 1R	MIL; 3R	BAR; 1R	BAR; 3R	WIG; DNP	WIG; 2R	MIL; 2R	MIL; 1R	WIG; 1R	WIG; 1R	BAR; 3R	BAR; 1R	BAR; 1R	BAR; 2R	DUB; 1R	DUB; 2R	BAR; 3R	BAR; 1R									
2018	BAR; 2R	BAR; 1R	BAR; 2R	BAR; 4R	MIL; 1R	MIL; 2R	BAR; 3R	BAR; 1R	WIG; 3R	WIG; 1R	MIL; 1R	MIL; 3R	WIG; 2R	WIG; 2R	BAR; 3R	BAR; 2R	BAR; 1R	BAR; 2R	DUB; 1R	DUB; 2R	BAR; 3R	BAR; 3R									
2019	WIG; 1R	WIG; 3R	WIG; 1R	WIG; 1R	BAR; 1R	BAR; 4R	WIG; 1R	WIG; 2R	BAR; 1R	BAR; 2R	BAR; 1R	BAR; 3R	BAR; 1R	BAR; 2R	BAR; 1R	BAR; 2R	WIG; 2R	WIG; 4R	BAR; 1R	BAR; 1R	HIL; 2R	HIL; 2R	BAR; 1R	BAR; 2R	BAR; 1R	BAR; 1R	DUB; 1R	DUB; 1R	BAR; 2R	BAR; 1R	
2020	BAR; 2R	BAR; 1R	WIG; 2R	WIG; 1R	WIG; 1R	WIG; 2R	BAR; 2R	BAR; 2R	MIL; 3R	MIL; 1R	MIL; 3R	MIL; 1R	MIL; 1R	NIE; 1R	NIE; 1R	NIE; 2R	NIE; 3R	NIE; 3R	COV; 1R	COV; 3R	COV; 1R	COV; 1R	COV; 1R								
2021 (Note: Not a Tour card holder)	BOL; 2R	BOL; 1R	BOL; 2R	BOL; 3R	MIL; 3R	MIL; 3R	MIL; 2R	MIL; 3R	NIE; 4R	NIE; 4R	NIE; 2R	NIE; 4R	MIL; 1R	MIL; 2R	MIL; 2R	MIL; 3R	COV; DNP	COV; 1R	COV; 1R	COV; 2R	BAR; 1R	BAR; 3R	BAR; 2R	BAR; 1R	BAR; 2R	BAR; 3R	BAR; 1R	BAR; 1R	BAR; 2R	BAR; 2R	
2022	BAR; 3R	BAR; 1R	WIG; 1R	WIG; 1R	BAR; 2R	BAR; 1R	NIE; 2R	NIE; 3R	BAR; 2R	BAR; 2R	BAR; 3R	BAR; 2R	BAR; 1R	WIG; 1R	WIG; 2R	NIE; 1R	NIE; 3R	BAR; 3R	BAR; QF	BAR; 2R	BAR; 3R	BAR; 2R	BAR; 1R	BAR; 2R	BAR; 2R	BAR; 2R	BAR; 1R	BAR; 1R	BAR; 4R	BAR; 1R	
2023	BAR; 1R	BAR; 3R	BAR; 2R	BAR; 1R	BAR; 2R	BAR; 2R	HIL; 2R	HIL; 2R	WIG; 2R	WIG; 1R	LEI; 2R	LEI; 3R	HIL; 2R	HIL; 2R	LEI; 1R	LEI; 2R	HIL; 2R	HIL; 2R	BAR; 1R	BAR; 2R	BAR; 1R	BAR; 2R	BAR; 1R	BAR; 2R	BAR; 1R	BAR; 2R	BAR; 3R	BAR; 2R	BAR; 2R	BAR; 2R	
2024	WIG; 1R	WIG; 2R	LEI; 2R	LEI; 2R	HIL; 1R	HIL; 1R	LEI; 3R	LEI; 2R	HIL; 1R	HIL; 1R	HIL; 1R	HIL; 1R	DNP		MIL; 2R	MIL; 2R	MIL; 1R	MIL; 1R	MIL; 2R	WIG; 1R	WIG; 1R	LEI; 2R	LEI; 1R	WIG; 2R	WIG; 1R	WIG; 4R	WIG; 1R	WIG; 1R	LEI; 1R	LEI; 2R	

Performance Table Legend
W	Won the tournament	F	Finalist	SF	Semifinalist	QF	Quarterfinalist	#R; RR; Prel.	Lost in # round Round-robin; Preliminary round	DQ	Disqualified
DNQ	Did not qualify	DNP	Did not participate	WD	Withdrew	NH	Tournament not held	#R; RR; Prel.	Lost in # round Round-robin; Preliminary round	NYF	Not yet founded
