= PDC World Cup of Darts =

Tournament information
- Established: 2010
- Organisation(s): PDC
- Format: Pairs event
- Prize fund: £450,000
- Month(s) Played: December (2010); February (2012–13); November (2020); September (2021); June (2014–19; 2022–)

Current champion(s)
- England (2026)

The PDC World Cup of Darts is a team darts tournament organised by the Professional Darts Corporation, and was one of the three new tournaments introduced into the PDC calendar in 2010. It is broadcast live by Sky Sports.

The first edition was held in 2010 but due to the rescheduling of the Players Championship Finals in the PDC calendar, the second edition was played in Hamburg, Germany, in February 2012. In 2015, the event took place the Eissporthalle Frankfurt, where it stayed until returning to Hamburg in 2019 when it moved to the Barclaycard Arena. In 2020, the event was held at the Salzburgarena in Salzburg, Austria, and in 2021, it returned to Germany, this time in the Sparkassen-Arena, Jena, and in 2022 it returned to Frankfurt where it has been held since.

The competition succeeded the Jocky Wilson Cup; a one-off international match between England and Scotland held in Glasgow on 5 December 2009. England defeated Scotland by 6 points to 0.

== Background ==
In October 2009, PDC chairman Barry Hearn announced his intention to buy the British Darts Organisation and inject £2 million into amateur darts, but the BDO decided not to accept the offer. In a statement, Hearn stated "The aim of our offer to the BDO was to unify the sport of darts and this remains our long-term objective despite the decision by the BDO County Associations" The Jocky Wilson Cup was held in December.

But following the BDO's rejection, the PDC went on to arrange three brand new tournaments for 2010 to help the development of youth and women's darts: the PDC Under-21 World Championship, the PDC Women's World Championship, and the PDC World Cup of Darts.

== Format ==
In the first 3 competitions (held in 2010, 2012 and 2013), the participating teams were the top 24 countries in the PDC Order of Merit at the end of October after the 2010 World Grand Prix. Each nation's top ranked player was then joined by the second highest player of that country. For seeding, the average rank of both was used.

The top 8 nations automatically started in the second round (last 16). The other 16 nations played in the first round. Matches were best of 11 legs in doubles, and the losing team threw first in the next leg. The winners of the first round played the top eight ranked teams in the second round, also in best of 11 doubles.

In 2010, the winners of the second round were drawn into two groups of four (A & B). Each team played each other once (three matches per team). Each match consisted of two singles and one doubles – all over best of five legs. 1 point was awarded for a singles win, and 2 points for a doubles win, with all points counting towards the overall league table. The top two teams in each group advanced to the semi-finals.

The semi-finals consisted of four singles games and one doubles game (if required) per match – all over best of 11 legs. Again, 1 point was awarded for a singles win, and 2 points for a doubles win. If the match score is 3–3 at the end of the games, then a sudden-death doubles leg would decide who goes through to the final.

The final was the same format as the semi-final, but each game was best of 15 legs.

In 2012, the first round format remained the same, with the exception being that the matches were best of 9 doubles. The second round had games where each match consisted of two singles and one doubles – over best of seven legs in singles, and best of 9 legs in doubles. As before, 1 point was awarded for a singles win, and 2 points for a doubles win. If the score was tied 2–2, then a sudden death doubles leg took place to determine the winner. The format was the same for the quarter-finals, with the exception that the doubles matches were best of 7 legs, like the singles.

In the semi-finals, games had each match consisting of four singles and one doubles match – over best of seven legs. As before, 1 point was awarded for a singles win, and 2 points for a doubles win. If the score was tied 3–3, then a sudden death doubles leg took place to determine the winner. In the final, the match consisted of four singles and one doubles match – over best of 13 legs. As before, 1 point was awarded for a singles win, and 2 points for a doubles win. If the score was tied 3–3, then a sudden death doubles leg took place to determine the winner.

In 2013, a new format was created. The 24 teams were put into groups of 3, which each contained one of the top 8 seeds, plus two other teams. The teams played each other in best of 9 doubles matches, with the top 2 in each group progressing to the last 16. The last 16 also used the same best of 9 doubles format.

In the quarter-finals onwards, the matches began with two best of 7 leg singles matches. If one team won both singles matches, they were declared the winner, if each team won one match each, a best of 7 doubles match would decide the winner. In the final, there would be four best of 7 leg singles matches (if needed), with a point for each win, with a 7 leg doubles decider, if the singles matches ended making the score 2–2.

In 2014 and 2015, the field extended to 32 teams, with the top 16 teams being seeded, and each playing a best of 9 doubles match to begin. After that, the format was the same as the later stages of the previous tournament with two best of 7 leg singles matches. If one team won both singles matches, they were declared the winner, if each team won one match each, a best of 7 doubles match would decide the winner. In the final, there would be four best of 7 leg singles matches (if needed), with a point for each win, with a 7 leg doubles decider, if the singles matches ended making the score 2–2. In 2015, the final was tweaked, so that the doubles match would be the third match.

The format remained the same until 2023, with the only major change being in 2016, when only the top 8 teams were seeded, rather than the top 16.

In March 2023, the PDC announced a completely revamped format for the following tournament set to happen between 15–18 June 2023. This new format consisted of 40 different nations for the first time in the events history and a group stage for the first time since 2013. 12 groups of 3 countries were drawn, with the winner of each group advancing into the second round, while the top four ranked countries automatically advance into the second round. This format also consisted of doubles throughout the competition for the first time.

== Results by year ==
#	Year	Winners		Score	Runners-up		Venue	Prize money (team)			Sponsors
#	Year	Players	Team	Score	Team	Players	Venue	Total	Winners	Runners-up	Sponsors
1	2010	Raymond van Barneveld; Co Stompé	Netherlands	4–2 (p)	Wales	Mark Webster; Barrie Bates	Rainton Meadows Arena; England, Houghton-le-Spring	£150,000	£40,000	£20,000	Cash Converters
2	2012	Phil Taylor; Adrian Lewis	England	4–3 (p)	Australia	Simon Whitlock; Paul Nicholson	Alsterdorfer Sporthalle; Germany, Hamburg	£150,000	£40,000	£20,000	Cash Converters
3	2013	Phil Taylor; Adrian Lewis	England	3–1 (m)	Belgium	Kim Huybrechts; Ronny Huybrechts	Alsterdorfer Sporthalle; Germany, Hamburg	£150,000	£40,000	£20,000	Betfair
4	2014	Michael van Gerwen; Raymond van Barneveld	Netherlands	3–0 (m)	England	Phil Taylor; Adrian Lewis	Alsterdorfer Sporthalle; Germany, Hamburg	£200,000	£40,000	£20,000	Bwin
5	2015	Phil Taylor; Adrian Lewis	England	3–2 (m)	Scotland	Gary Anderson; Peter Wright	Eissporthalle; Germany, Frankfurt	£250,000	£50,000	£26,000	Bwin
6	2016	Phil Taylor; Adrian Lewis	England	3–2 (m)	Netherlands	Michael van Gerwen; Raymond van Barneveld	Eissporthalle; Germany, Frankfurt	£250,000	£50,000	£26,000	Betway
7	2017	Michael van Gerwen; Raymond van Barneveld	Netherlands	3–1 (m)	Wales	Mark Webster; Gerwyn Price	Eissporthalle; Germany, Frankfurt	£300,000	£60,000	£32,000	Betway
8	2018	Michael van Gerwen; Raymond van Barneveld	Netherlands	3–1 (m)	Scotland	Gary Anderson; Peter Wright	Eissporthalle; Germany, Frankfurt	£300,000	£60,000	£32,000	Betway
9	2019	Gary Anderson; Peter Wright	Scotland	3–1 (m)	Ireland	Steve Lennon; William O'Connor	Barclaycard Arena; Germany, Hamburg	£350,000	£70,000	£40,000	BetVictor
10	2020	Gerwyn Price; Jonny Clayton	Wales	3–0 (m)	England	Michael Smith; Rob Cross	Salzburgarena; Austria, Salzburg	£350,000	£70,000	£40,000	BetVictor
11	2021	Peter Wright; John Henderson	Scotland	3–1 (m)	Austria	Mensur Suljović; Rowby-John Rodriguez	Sparkassen-Arena; Germany, Jena	£350,000	£70,000	£40,000	Cazoo
12	2022	Damon Heta; Simon Whitlock	Australia	3–1 (m)	Wales	Gerwyn Price; Jonny Clayton	Eissporthalle; Germany, Frankfurt	£350,000	£70,000	£40,000	Cazoo
13	2023	Gerwyn Price; Jonny Clayton	Wales	10–2 (l)	Scotland	Peter Wright; Gary Anderson	Eissporthalle; Germany, Frankfurt	£450,000	£80,000	£50,000	My Diesel Claim
14	2024	Luke Humphries; Michael Smith	England	10–6 (l)	Austria	Mensur Suljović; Rowby-John Rodriguez	Eissporthalle; Germany, Frankfurt	£450,000	£80,000	£50,000	BetVictor
15	2025	Josh Rock; Daryl Gurney	Northern Ireland	10–9 (l)	Wales	Gerwyn Price; Jonny Clayton	Eissporthalle; Germany, Frankfurt	£450,000	£80,000	£50,000	BetVictor
16	2026	Luke Littler; Luke Humphries	England	10–5 (l)	Netherlands	Gian van Veen; Michael van Gerwen	Eissporthalle; Germany, Frankfurt	£500,000	£100,000	£48,000	BetVictor

== Records and statistics ==
As of 14 June 2026.

=== Individual appearances ===
As of the 2026 tournament, only 2 players have played in all 16 editions of the World Cup of Darts.

They are:

- William O'Connor
- Mensur Suljović

=== Total finalist appearances ===
==== Country ====
Rank	Country	Won	Runner-up	Finals	Appearances
1	England	6	2	8	16
2	Netherlands	4	2	6	16
3	Wales	2	4	6	16
4	Scotland	2	3	5	16
5	Australia	1	1	2	16
6	Northern Ireland	1	0	1	16
7	Austria	0	2	2	16
8	Belgium	0	1	1	16
8	Ireland	0	1	1	16

- In the event of identical records, countries are first sorted by date first achieved

==== Team ====
Rank	Players	Team	Won	Runner-up	Finals	Appearances
1	Phil Taylor and Adrian Lewis	England	4	1	5	6
2	Michael van Gerwen and Raymond van Barneveld	Netherlands	3	1	4	6
3	Gerwyn Price and Jonny Clayton	Wales	2	2	4	7
4	Gary Anderson and Peter Wright	Scotland	1	3	4	8
5	Raymond van Barneveld and Co Stompé	Netherlands	1	0	1	1
5	Peter Wright and John Henderson	Scotland	1	0	1	2
5	Damon Heta and Simon Whitlock	Australia	1	0	1	6
5	Luke Humphries and Michael Smith	England	1	0	1	1
5	Josh Rock and Daryl Gurney	Northern Ireland	1	0	1	2
5	Luke Littler and Luke Humphries	England	1	0	1	2
11	Mensur Suljović and Rowby-John Rodriguez	Austria	0	2	2	9
12	Mark Webster and Barrie Bates	Wales	0	1	1	1
12	Simon Whitlock and Paul Nicholson	Australia	0	1	1	5
12	Kim Huybrechts and Ronny Huybrechts	Belgium	0	1	1	5
12	Mark Webster and Gerwyn Price	Wales	0	1	1	2
12	Steve Lennon and William O'Connor	Ireland	0	1	1	5
12	Michael Smith and Rob Cross	England	0	1	1	3
12	Gian van Veen and Michael van Gerwen	Netherlands	0	1	1	1

- In the event of identical records, teams are first sorted by date first achieved

==== Player ====
Rank	Player	Team	Won	Runner-up	Finals	Appearances
1	**Adrian Lewis**	England	4	1	5	6
1	Phil Taylor	England	4	1	5	6
1	**Raymond van Barneveld**	Netherlands	4	1	5	8
4	**Michael van Gerwen**	Netherlands	3	2	5	11
5	**Peter Wright**	Scotland	2	3	5	11
5	**Gerwyn Price**	Wales	2	3	5	10
7	**Jonny Clayton**	Wales	2	2	4	9
8	**Luke Humphries**	England	2	0	2	3
9	**Gary Anderson**	Scotland	1	3	4	12
10	**Simon Whitlock**	Australia	1	1	2	15
10	**Michael Smith**	England	1	1	2	5
12	Co Stompé	Netherlands	1	0	1	1
12	John Henderson	Scotland	1	0	1	3
12	**Damon Heta**	Australia	1	0	1	7
12	**Daryl Gurney**	Northern Ireland	1	0	1	10
12	**Josh Rock**	Northern Ireland	1	0	1	3
12	**Luke Littler**	England	1	0	1	2
18	Mark Webster	Wales	0	2	2	7
18	**Rowby-John Rodriguez**	Austria	0	2	2	9
18	**Mensur Suljović**	Austria	0	2	2	16
21	Barrie Bates	Wales	0	1	1	1
21	Paul Nicholson	Australia	0	1	1	5
21	**Kim Huybrechts**	Belgium	0	1	1	13
21	**Ronny Huybrechts**	Belgium	0	1	1	5
21	**Steve Lennon**	Ireland	0	1	1	5
21	**William O'Connor**	Ireland	0	1	1	16
21	**Rob Cross**	England	0	1	1	4
21	**Gian van Veen**	Netherlands	0	1	1	2

- Active players are shown in **bold**
- Only players who reached the final are included
- In the event of identical records, players are first sorted by date first achieved, and second in alphabetical order by family name

=== High averages ===
==== Team ====
Ten highest World Cup of Darts one-match team averages
Average	Team	Year (+ Round)	Opponents	Result (legs)
118.10 (WR)	Krzysztof Ratajski and Krzysztof Kciuk	2023, Group Stage	Darius Labanauskas and Mindaugas Barauskas	4–1
117.88	Michael van Gerwen and Raymond van Barneveld	2014, Semi-finals	Brendan Dolan and Mickey Mansell	4–0
111.33	Michael van Gerwen and Raymond van Barneveld	2017, Second round	Darin Young and Larry Butler	4–0
109.33	Michael van Gerwen and Raymond van Barneveld	2017, First round	Karel Sedláček and František Humpula	5–1
109.31	Damon Heta and Simon Whitlock	2022, Quarter-finals	Dimitri Van den Bergh and Kim Huybrechts	4–0
108.41	Simon Whitlock and Paul Nicholson	2010, Group stage	John Part and Ken MacNeil	3–1
107.77	Michael van Gerwen and Raymond van Barneveld	2016, Quarter-finals	Simon Whitlock and Kyle Anderson	4–3
105.48	Kim Huybrechts and Ronny Huybrechts	2013, Semi-finals	Jani Haavisto and Jarkko Komula	4–0
105.17	Michael van Gerwen and Raymond van Barneveld	2017, Quarter-finals	Max Hopp and Martin Schindler	4–1
104.97	Krzysztof Ratajski and Krzysztof Kciuk	2021, First round	Karel Sedláček and Adam Gawlas	5–2

Different teams with a 100+ match average (Updated 14/06/2026)
Team	Total	Highest Av.	Year (+ Round)
Michael van Gerwen and Raymond van Barneveld	6	117.88	2014, Semi-finals
Gerwyn Price and Jonny Clayton	3	103.93	2021, Semi-finals
Krzysztof Ratajski and Krzysztof Kciuk	2	118.10	2023, Group Stage
Simon Whitlock and Paul Nicholson	2	108.41	2010, Group stage
Kim Huybrechts and Ronny Huybrechts	2	105.48	2013, Semi-finals
Luke Littler and Luke Humphries	2	104.77	2026, Final
Gian van Veen and Michael van Gerwen	2	102.68	2026, Quarter-Finals
Damon Heta and Simon Whitlock	1	109.31	2022, Quarter-finals
Karel Sedláček and Adam Gawlas	1	103.47	2021, First round
Gary Anderson and Robert Thornton	1	102.35	2010, Group stage
Martin Schindler and Ricardo Pietreczko	1	101.90	2026, Group stage
Gary Anderson and Peter Wright	1	101.55	2019, First round
Danny Noppert and Michael van Gerwen	1	100.96	2024, Second round
Luke Humphries and Michael Smith	1	100.62	2024, Final
Kim Huybrechts and Dimitri Van den Bergh	1	100.20	2018, Quarter-finals
Steve Lennon and William O'Connor	1	100.20	2019, Semi-finals
Danny Noppert and Gian van Veen	1	100.20	2025, Second round
Gerwyn Price and Mark Webster	1	100.14	2017, First round

==== Whitewashes ====
This table consists of the countries who have been whitewashed with the new pairs format (from the knockout stages) that was introduced in the 2023 PDC World Cup of Darts.

Year	Winner	Score	Loser	Ref.
2023	Scotland (89.07)	8–0	France (80.59)	
2025	Netherlands (100.20)	8–0	Scotland (79.37)	
2026	Scotland (99.37)	8–0	Norway (83.82)	

==== Individual ====
This table consists of the players who hit the highest singles averages before the new pairs format was introduced in the 2023 edition.

Ten highest World Cup of Darts one-match individual averages
Average	Player	Year (+ Round)	Opponent	Result
121.97	Kim Huybrechts	2017, Quarter-finals	Paul Lim	4–1 (l)
117.88	Gerwyn Price	2022, Quarter-finals	Martin Schindler	4–0 (l)
115.62	Ronny Huybrechts	2017, Second round	John Michael	4–0 (l)
115.10	William O'Connor	2019, Second round	Rob Cross	4–1 (l)
113.43	Phil Taylor	2015, Final	Peter Wright	4–0 (l)
113.43	Mensur Suljović	2019, Second round	Chuck Puleo	4–0 (l)
113.38	Raymond van Barneveld	2018, Semi-finals	Dimitri Van den Bergh	4–2 (l)
111.33	Michael van Gerwen	2018, Final	Gary Anderson	4–0 (l)
110.64	Dirk van Duijvenbode	2022, Second round	Steve Lennon	4–1 (l)
110.29	Peter Wright	2019, Quarter-finals	Dimitri Van den Bergh	4–2 (l)
