= Ken MacNeil =

Canadian darts player

Personal information
- Nickname: "Silver Dart"
- Born: 16 December 1975 (age 50) Sydney, Nova Scotia, Canada
- Home town: Edmonton, Alberta, Canada

Sport
- Sport: Darts
- Playing since: 1986
- Darts: 22 Gram Shot
- Laterality: Right-handed
- Walk-on music: "You Ain't Seen Nothing Yet" by Bachman–Turner Overdrive

Organisation (see split in darts)
- BDO: 2005–2009
- PDC: 2009–2016
- WDF: 2017–

WDF major events – best performances
- World Masters: Last 128: 2006

PDC premier events – best performances
- World Championship: Last 64: 2010
- UK Open: Last 64: 2013

Other tournament wins
- Tournament: Years
- Klondike Open: 2015

Ken MacNeil (born 16 December 1975) is a Canadian professional darts player who plays in World Darts Federation (WDF) events.

== Career ==
MacNeil qualified for the 2010 PDC World Darts Championship by finishing fourth in the North American Order of Merit. In the preliminary round, he defeated Guyana's Norman Madhoo 4–2. In the first round, he lost 3–2 to Alan Tabern.

He represented Canada with John Part in the 2012 PDC World Cup of Darts and together they reached the second round by defeating Hungary 5–3. MacNeil then beat 15-time World Champion Phil Taylor in his singles match, but they would eventually succumb 3–2 to the English duo of Taylor and Adrian Lewis, having lost a sudden death leg. In June MacNeil lost in the final of the Canadian Open to Terry Hayhurst.

MacNeil entered Q School in an attempt to win a PDC Tour Card to play the full circuit in 2013 and 2014 and succeeded on the first day, defeating David Copley 6–2 in his final match. He dedicated his success to his late father who had died a month earlier. MacNeil did not play in his third World Cup of Darts as Jeff Smith had overtaken him in the Order of Merit as Canada's second highest player behind John Part. In May, he matched his best ever result in a PDC event by reaching the last 16 of the fourth Players Championship courtesy of wins over Wayne Jones, Nick Fullwell and Paul Nicholson, before losing 6–4 to Jamie Caven. MacNeil lost 9–8 to Ronnie Baxter in the third round of the UK Open. He did not play in a PDC event throughout the rest 2013 and the whole of 2014.

MacNeil returned to Q School in January 2015 and was defeated in the final round on day three by Jason Wilson. However, after all four days had been completed he finished second on the Order of Merit to earn a new two-year tour card. At the World Cup, MacNeil and Part lost 5–4 to New Zealand in the first round. He qualified for a couple of European Tour events in 2015, but was knocked out in the first round of both. In October at the 18th Players Championship, MacNeil defeated Wes Newton 6–2, Eddie Dootson 6–3, Jamie Caven 6–3 and Justin Pipe 6–1 to reach his first PDC quarter-final in over five years, where he was beaten 6–1 by Gary Anderson.

MacNeil lost 6–3 in the opening round of the 2016 UK Open to Rob Cross. He failed to get beyond the last 64 of an individual event this year. However, with John Part at the World Cup, team Canada saw off Greece 5–2 in the first round. Their second round match with Wales went to a doubles decider after Part beat Mark Webster, but MacNeil lost 4–0 to Gerwyn Price. Canada won it 4–2 to move into the quarter-finals, which again went to a doubles match after Part beat Brendan Dolan and MacNeil lost 4–0 to Daryl Gurney. Northern Ireland would win the game 4–1.

With his PDC tour card status now expired, MacNeil played in 2017 Q School, but didn't get past the last 64 on any of the four days.

== World Championship results ==
=== PDC ===
- 2010: First round (lost to Alan Tabern 2–3)
