= Eissporthalle Frankfurt =

Indoor ice hockey venue in Germany

- Eissporthalle am Ratsweg

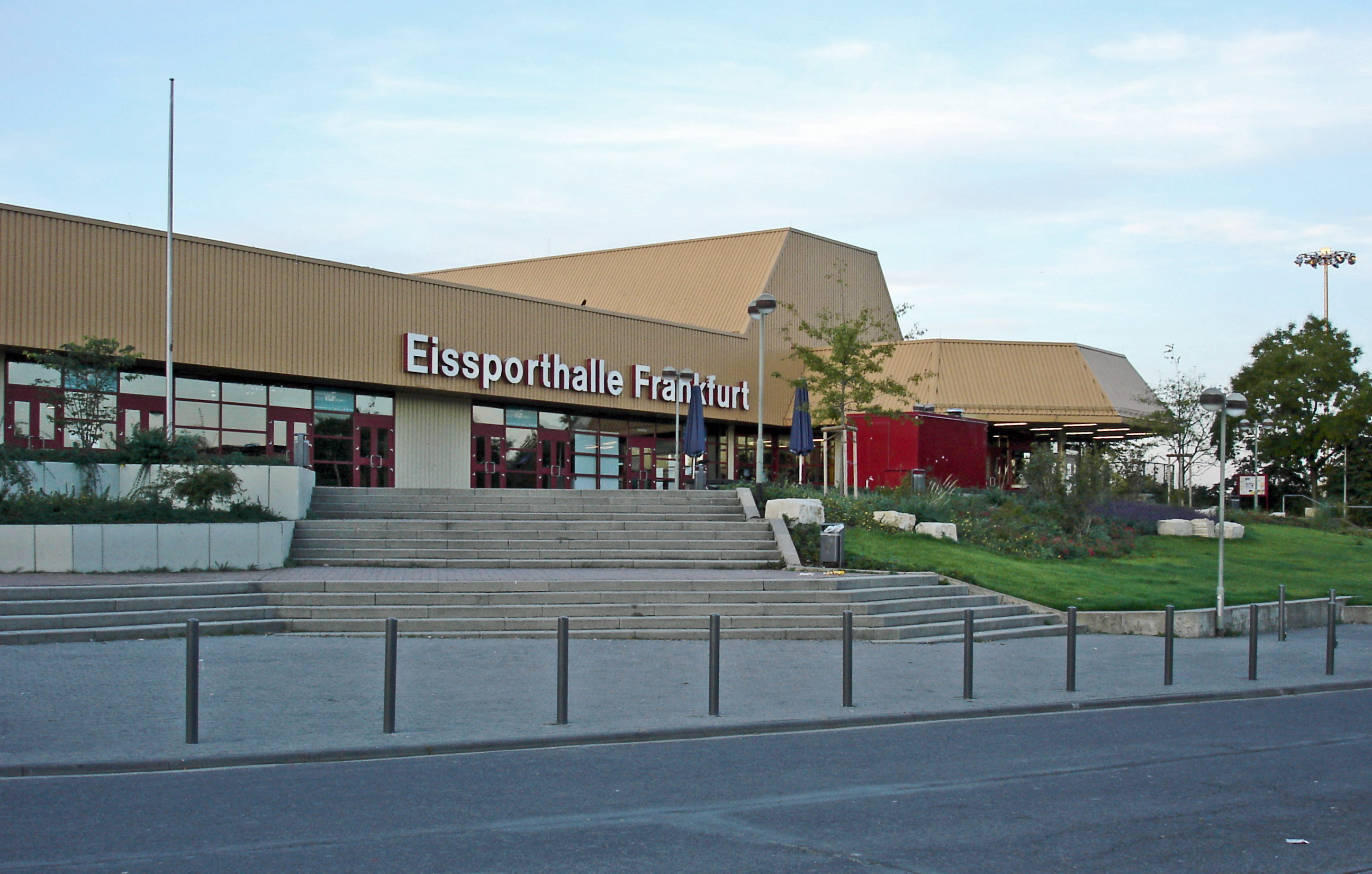
- Interactive map of Eissporthalle Frankfurt
- Location: Frankfurt, Germany
- Coordinates: 50°07′31″N 8°43′17″E
- Capacity: 6,946
- Public transit: Eissporthalle/Festplatz; 12 Eissporthalle/Festplatz; 38, 103N, 103 Eissporthalle/Festplatz

Construction
- Opened: 19 December 1981; 44 years ago

Tenants
- Eintracht Frankfurt (1981–1991; 2002–present); EHC Frankfurt 1988 (1988–2002); Frankfurter ESC "Die Löwen" / Frankfurt Lions (1991–2010); Löwen Frankfurt (2010–present); Die Eisteufel

Website
- www.eissporthalle-ffm.de

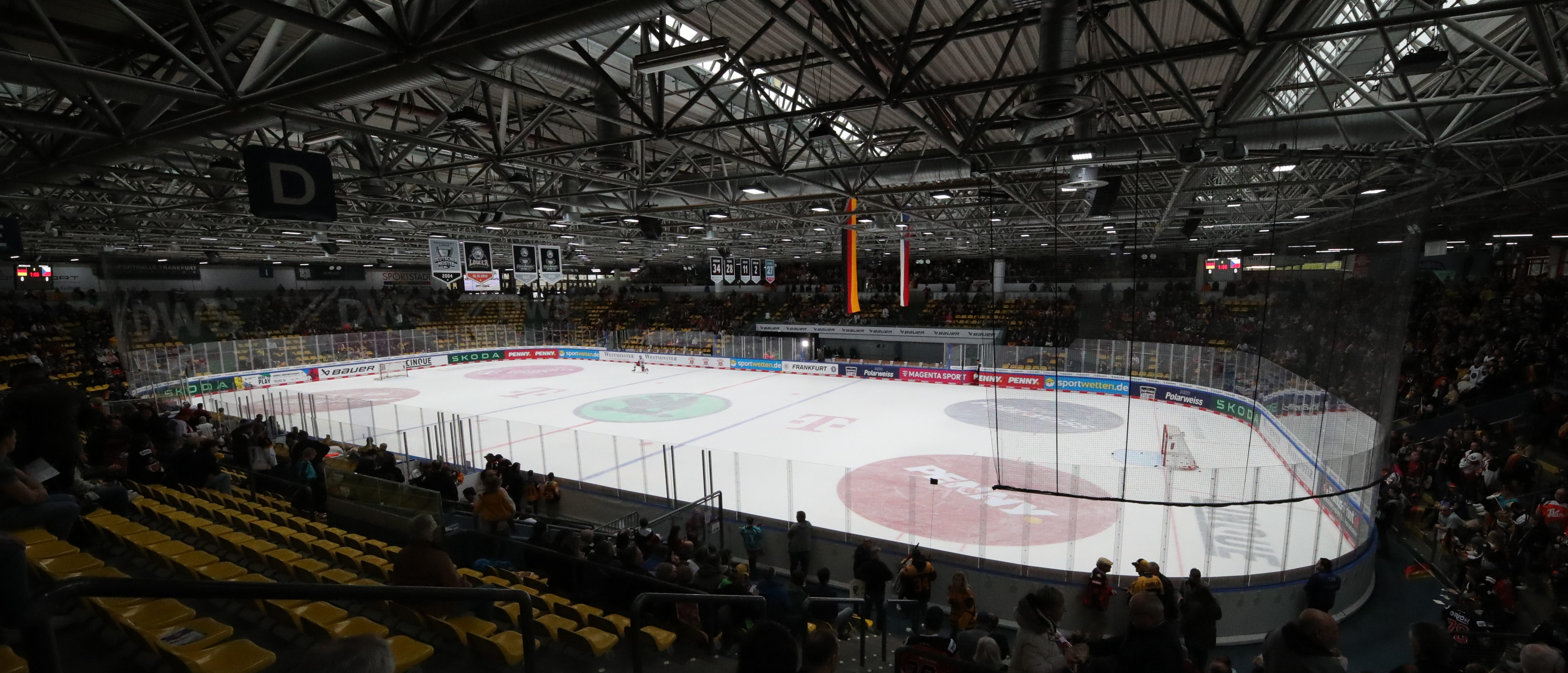
Interior (2023)

Eissporthalle Frankfurt or Eissporthalle am Ratsweg is an arena in the Bornheim district of Frankfurt, Germany. It is used for ice hockey and is the home arena of Löwen Frankfurt. It is also used as an ice skating rink.

It has opened on 19 December 1981 and holds 6,946 people.

== History ==
The first skating rink in Frankfurt opened during a patent exhibition in 1882 in the Palmengarten. It covered 520 m^{2} and operated for two months; the refrigeration system was designed by Linde, and it was probably the first skating rink where Ammonia was used as a refrigerant. Ten years later, a larger rink was permanently installed on the same site.

The Eissporthalle was designed by Richard Heil and Werner Deyle, when it opened it was one of two buildings with ice skating rinks, the other was next to the Waldstadion which closed in the 1990s. Today it is the only ice skating rink in Frankfurt, although a few others exist in the metropolitan area.

== Function ==
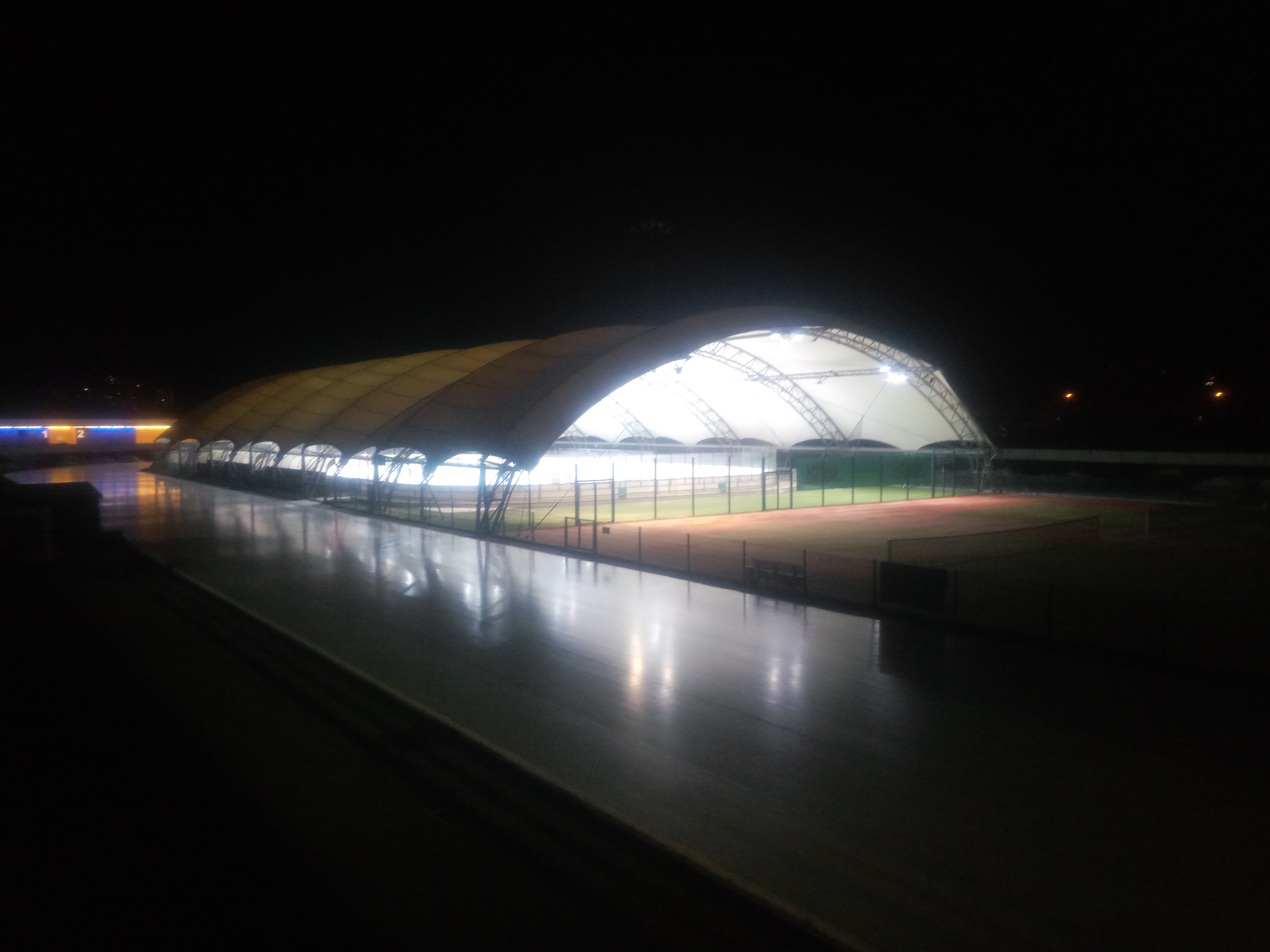
The exterior tent

The arena complex includes four different skating areas, linked by a corridor of ice - the main arena, which is a standard size Ice Hockey rink, a smaller indoor room used for curling and Hockey training, and an outside area split into two - a large oval shaped track open to the public, with another Ice Hockey rink in the centre, rarely open to the public. There is also a large indoor bar and a small outdoor snack area. The price depends on what season it is, with an adult pass in the high season costing 7 Euro, and 5 in the low season.

The large car park to the front of the building also serves as a major showground for events coming to the city, with the largest being the annual Dippemess funfair every April.

== See also ==
- List of indoor arenas in Germany
