= 2018 Grand Slam of Darts =

2018 bwin Grand Slam of Darts

Tournament information
- Dates: 10–18 November 2018
- Venue: Aldersley Leisure Village
- Location: Aldersley, Wolverhampton
- Country: England
- Organisation(s): PDC
- Format: Legs
- Prize fund: £450,000
- Winner's share: £110,000
- Nine-dart finish: (Belgium) Dimitri Van den Bergh
- High checkout: 170 (Australia) Simon Whitlock (x2) (England) Stephen Bunting (Wales) Gerwyn Price

Champion(s)
- (Wales) Gerwyn Price

The 2018 bwin Grand Slam of Darts was the twelfth staging of the tournament, organised by the Professional Darts Corporation. The event took place from 10–18 November 2018 in Wolverhampton, England, but for the first time in the event's history, it was not at the Wolverhampton Civic Hall, as it was undergoing a two-year renovation. The 2018 tournament was held at Aldersley Leisure Village. Beginning with this tournament, the winner of the title would receive "The Eric Bristow Trophy", named after the legendary player who died in April 2018.

The tournament's defending champion was Michael van Gerwen, who won the tournament in 2017 by defeating Peter Wright 16–12 in the final to win it for a third straight year, but lost in the semi-finals to Gary Anderson by the same scoreline 16–12.

Gerwyn Price won his first PDC major title by defeating Gary Anderson 16–13, in a highly controversial final. Price also became the first Welsh player to win a PDC major title.

The DRA launched an investigation into the behaviour from both players in the final. Price was fined £21,500 for a combination of 'Bringing the sport into disrepute and gamesmanship' in the final and for his Quarter-final clash with Simon Whitlock. Price was also given a three month ban, which was suspended for 6 months. Anderson was given a formal warning for pushing Price on the oche. Price's fine was subsequently reduced on appeal to a total of £11,500.

Dimitri Van den Bergh hit the fourth nine dart leg in Grand Slam of Darts history, in his second round match against Stephen Bunting, and for the first time in the tournament history no Englishman progressed into the quarter-final stage.

== Prize money ==
The prize fund for the Grand Slam was the same as in 2017, with the winner getting £110,000.

Position (num. of players)		Prize money (Total: £450,000)
Winner	(1)	£110,000
Runner-up	(1)	£55,000
Semi-finalists	(2)	£28,500
Quarter-finalists	(4)	£16,000
Last 16 (second round)	(8)	£10,000
Third in group	(8)	£5,000
Fourth in group	(8)	£3,000
Group winner bonus	(8)	£2,500
Nine-dart finish	(1)	£25,000

== Qualifying ==
=== PDC Qualifying Tournaments ===
PDC Main Tournaments
Tournament	Year	Position	Player	Qualifiers
PDC World Darts Championship	2018	Winner	(England) Rob Cross	(England) Rob Cross (Netherlands) Michael van Gerwen (Scotland) Gary Anderson (Belgium) Dimitri Van den Bergh (England) James Wade (Netherlands) Raymond van Barneveld (Scotland) Peter Wright (England) Michael Smith (Austria) Mensur Suljović (England) Josh Payne (Australia) Simon Whitlock (Wales) Jonny Clayton
Grand Slam of Darts	2017	Winner	(Netherlands) Michael van Gerwen	(England) Rob Cross (Netherlands) Michael van Gerwen (Scotland) Gary Anderson (Belgium) Dimitri Van den Bergh (England) James Wade (Netherlands) Raymond van Barneveld (Scotland) Peter Wright (England) Michael Smith (Austria) Mensur Suljović (England) Josh Payne (Australia) Simon Whitlock (Wales) Jonny Clayton
Premier League Darts	2018	Winner	(Netherlands) Michael van Gerwen	(England) Rob Cross (Netherlands) Michael van Gerwen (Scotland) Gary Anderson (Belgium) Dimitri Van den Bergh (England) James Wade (Netherlands) Raymond van Barneveld (Scotland) Peter Wright (England) Michael Smith (Austria) Mensur Suljović (England) Josh Payne (Australia) Simon Whitlock (Wales) Jonny Clayton
World Matchplay	2018	Winner	(Scotland) Gary Anderson	(England) Rob Cross (Netherlands) Michael van Gerwen (Scotland) Gary Anderson (Belgium) Dimitri Van den Bergh (England) James Wade (Netherlands) Raymond van Barneveld (Scotland) Peter Wright (England) Michael Smith (Austria) Mensur Suljović (England) Josh Payne (Australia) Simon Whitlock (Wales) Jonny Clayton
World Grand Prix	2018	Winner	(Netherlands) Michael van Gerwen	(England) Rob Cross (Netherlands) Michael van Gerwen (Scotland) Gary Anderson (Belgium) Dimitri Van den Bergh (England) James Wade (Netherlands) Raymond van Barneveld (Scotland) Peter Wright (England) Michael Smith (Austria) Mensur Suljović (England) Josh Payne (Australia) Simon Whitlock (Wales) Jonny Clayton
PDC World Youth Championship	2017	Winner	(Belgium) Dimitri Van den Bergh	(England) Rob Cross (Netherlands) Michael van Gerwen (Scotland) Gary Anderson (Belgium) Dimitri Van den Bergh (England) James Wade (Netherlands) Raymond van Barneveld (Scotland) Peter Wright (England) Michael Smith (Austria) Mensur Suljović (England) Josh Payne (Australia) Simon Whitlock (Wales) Jonny Clayton
Masters	2018	Winner	(Netherlands) Michael van Gerwen	(England) Rob Cross (Netherlands) Michael van Gerwen (Scotland) Gary Anderson (Belgium) Dimitri Van den Bergh (England) James Wade (Netherlands) Raymond van Barneveld (Scotland) Peter Wright (England) Michael Smith (Austria) Mensur Suljović (England) Josh Payne (Australia) Simon Whitlock (Wales) Jonny Clayton
UK Open	2018	Winner	(Scotland) Gary Anderson	(England) Rob Cross (Netherlands) Michael van Gerwen (Scotland) Gary Anderson (Belgium) Dimitri Van den Bergh (England) James Wade (Netherlands) Raymond van Barneveld (Scotland) Peter Wright (England) Michael Smith (Austria) Mensur Suljović (England) Josh Payne (Australia) Simon Whitlock (Wales) Jonny Clayton
European Championship	2018	Winner	(England) James Wade	(England) Rob Cross (Netherlands) Michael van Gerwen (Scotland) Gary Anderson (Belgium) Dimitri Van den Bergh (England) James Wade (Netherlands) Raymond van Barneveld (Scotland) Peter Wright (England) Michael Smith (Austria) Mensur Suljović (England) Josh Payne (Australia) Simon Whitlock (Wales) Jonny Clayton
Players Championship Finals	2017	Winner	(Netherlands) Michael van Gerwen	(England) Rob Cross (Netherlands) Michael van Gerwen (Scotland) Gary Anderson (Belgium) Dimitri Van den Bergh (England) James Wade (Netherlands) Raymond van Barneveld (Scotland) Peter Wright (England) Michael Smith (Austria) Mensur Suljović (England) Josh Payne (Australia) Simon Whitlock (Wales) Jonny Clayton
Champions League of Darts	2018	Winner	(Scotland) Gary Anderson	(England) Rob Cross (Netherlands) Michael van Gerwen (Scotland) Gary Anderson (Belgium) Dimitri Van den Bergh (England) James Wade (Netherlands) Raymond van Barneveld (Scotland) Peter Wright (England) Michael Smith (Austria) Mensur Suljović (England) Josh Payne (Australia) Simon Whitlock (Wales) Jonny Clayton
World Series of Darts Finals	2018	Winner	(England) James Wade	(England) Rob Cross (Netherlands) Michael van Gerwen (Scotland) Gary Anderson (Belgium) Dimitri Van den Bergh (England) James Wade (Netherlands) Raymond van Barneveld (Scotland) Peter Wright (England) Michael Smith (Austria) Mensur Suljović (England) Josh Payne (Australia) Simon Whitlock (Wales) Jonny Clayton
PDC World Cup of Darts	2018	Winners	(Netherlands) Michael van Gerwen (Netherlands) Raymond van Barneveld	(England) Rob Cross (Netherlands) Michael van Gerwen (Scotland) Gary Anderson (Belgium) Dimitri Van den Bergh (England) James Wade (Netherlands) Raymond van Barneveld (Scotland) Peter Wright (England) Michael Smith (Austria) Mensur Suljović (England) Josh Payne (Australia) Simon Whitlock (Wales) Jonny Clayton
PDC World Darts Championship	2018	Runner-up	(England) ~~Phil Taylor~~ (Note: Phil Taylor retired following the 2018 PDC World Darts Championship.)	(England) Rob Cross (Netherlands) Michael van Gerwen (Scotland) Gary Anderson (Belgium) Dimitri Van den Bergh (England) James Wade (Netherlands) Raymond van Barneveld (Scotland) Peter Wright (England) Michael Smith (Austria) Mensur Suljović (England) Josh Payne (Australia) Simon Whitlock (Wales) Jonny Clayton
Grand Slam of Darts	2017	Runner-up	(Scotland) Peter Wright	(England) Rob Cross (Netherlands) Michael van Gerwen (Scotland) Gary Anderson (Belgium) Dimitri Van den Bergh (England) James Wade (Netherlands) Raymond van Barneveld (Scotland) Peter Wright (England) Michael Smith (Austria) Mensur Suljović (England) Josh Payne (Australia) Simon Whitlock (Wales) Jonny Clayton
Premier League Darts	2018	Runner-up	(England) Michael Smith	(England) Rob Cross (Netherlands) Michael van Gerwen (Scotland) Gary Anderson (Belgium) Dimitri Van den Bergh (England) James Wade (Netherlands) Raymond van Barneveld (Scotland) Peter Wright (England) Michael Smith (Austria) Mensur Suljović (England) Josh Payne (Australia) Simon Whitlock (Wales) Jonny Clayton
World Matchplay	2018	Runner-up	(Austria) Mensur Suljović	(England) Rob Cross (Netherlands) Michael van Gerwen (Scotland) Gary Anderson (Belgium) Dimitri Van den Bergh (England) James Wade (Netherlands) Raymond van Barneveld (Scotland) Peter Wright (England) Michael Smith (Austria) Mensur Suljović (England) Josh Payne (Australia) Simon Whitlock (Wales) Jonny Clayton
World Grand Prix	2018	Runner-up	(Scotland) Peter Wright	(England) Rob Cross (Netherlands) Michael van Gerwen (Scotland) Gary Anderson (Belgium) Dimitri Van den Bergh (England) James Wade (Netherlands) Raymond van Barneveld (Scotland) Peter Wright (England) Michael Smith (Austria) Mensur Suljović (England) Josh Payne (Australia) Simon Whitlock (Wales) Jonny Clayton
PDC World Youth Championship	2017	Runner-up	(England) Josh Payne	(England) Rob Cross (Netherlands) Michael van Gerwen (Scotland) Gary Anderson (Belgium) Dimitri Van den Bergh (England) James Wade (Netherlands) Raymond van Barneveld (Scotland) Peter Wright (England) Michael Smith (Austria) Mensur Suljović (England) Josh Payne (Australia) Simon Whitlock (Wales) Jonny Clayton
Masters	2018	Runner-up	(Netherlands) Raymond van Barneveld	(England) Rob Cross (Netherlands) Michael van Gerwen (Scotland) Gary Anderson (Belgium) Dimitri Van den Bergh (England) James Wade (Netherlands) Raymond van Barneveld (Scotland) Peter Wright (England) Michael Smith (Austria) Mensur Suljović (England) Josh Payne (Australia) Simon Whitlock (Wales) Jonny Clayton
UK Open	2018	Runner-up	(Australia) ~~Corey Cadby~~ (Note: Corey Cadby withdrew from the Grand Slam, due to an arm injury.)	(England) Rob Cross (Netherlands) Michael van Gerwen (Scotland) Gary Anderson (Belgium) Dimitri Van den Bergh (England) James Wade (Netherlands) Raymond van Barneveld (Scotland) Peter Wright (England) Michael Smith (Austria) Mensur Suljović (England) Josh Payne (Australia) Simon Whitlock (Wales) Jonny Clayton
European Championship	2018	Runner-up	(Australia) Simon Whitlock	(England) Rob Cross (Netherlands) Michael van Gerwen (Scotland) Gary Anderson (Belgium) Dimitri Van den Bergh (England) James Wade (Netherlands) Raymond van Barneveld (Scotland) Peter Wright (England) Michael Smith (Austria) Mensur Suljović (England) Josh Payne (Australia) Simon Whitlock (Wales) Jonny Clayton
Players Championship Finals	2017	Runner-up	(Wales) Jonny Clayton	(England) Rob Cross (Netherlands) Michael van Gerwen (Scotland) Gary Anderson (Belgium) Dimitri Van den Bergh (England) James Wade (Netherlands) Raymond van Barneveld (Scotland) Peter Wright (England) Michael Smith (Austria) Mensur Suljović (England) Josh Payne (Australia) Simon Whitlock (Wales) Jonny Clayton
Champions League of Darts	2018	Runner-up	(Scotland) Peter Wright	(England) Rob Cross (Netherlands) Michael van Gerwen (Scotland) Gary Anderson (Belgium) Dimitri Van den Bergh (England) James Wade (Netherlands) Raymond van Barneveld (Scotland) Peter Wright (England) Michael Smith (Austria) Mensur Suljović (England) Josh Payne (Australia) Simon Whitlock (Wales) Jonny Clayton
World Series of Darts Finals	2018	Runner-up	(England) Michael Smith	(England) Rob Cross (Netherlands) Michael van Gerwen (Scotland) Gary Anderson (Belgium) Dimitri Van den Bergh (England) James Wade (Netherlands) Raymond van Barneveld (Scotland) Peter Wright (England) Michael Smith (Austria) Mensur Suljović (England) Josh Payne (Australia) Simon Whitlock (Wales) Jonny Clayton
PDC World Cup of Darts	2018	Runners-Up	(Scotland) Peter Wright (Scotland) Gary Anderson	(England) Rob Cross (Netherlands) Michael van Gerwen (Scotland) Gary Anderson (Belgium) Dimitri Van den Bergh (England) James Wade (Netherlands) Raymond van Barneveld (Scotland) Peter Wright (England) Michael Smith (Austria) Mensur Suljović (England) Josh Payne (Australia) Simon Whitlock (Wales) Jonny Clayton
Note: Players in italics had already qualified for the tournament.				(England) Rob Cross (Netherlands) Michael van Gerwen (Scotland) Gary Anderson (Belgium) Dimitri Van den Bergh (England) James Wade (Netherlands) Raymond van Barneveld (Scotland) Peter Wright (England) Michael Smith (Austria) Mensur Suljović (England) Josh Payne (Australia) Simon Whitlock (Wales) Jonny Clayton

At most sixteen players could qualify through this method, where the position in the list depicts the priority of the qualification.

As the list of qualifiers from the main tournaments produced fewer than sixteen players, the field of sixteen players is filled from the reserve lists. The first list consists of the winners from 2018 European Tour events, in which the winners are ordered by number of event wins then in Order of Merit position order at the cut-off date.

PDC European Tour
Tournament	Event	Position	Player	Qualifiers
2018 European Tour
2018 European Tour	European Darts Open	Winner	(Netherlands) Michael van Gerwen	(Wales) Gerwyn Price (England) Ian White (Germany) Max Hopp
2018 European Tour	German Darts Grand Prix	Winner	(Netherlands) Michael van Gerwen	(Wales) Gerwyn Price (England) Ian White (Germany) Max Hopp
2018 European Tour	German Darts Open	Winner	(Germany) Max Hopp	(Wales) Gerwyn Price (England) Ian White (Germany) Max Hopp
2018 European Tour	Austrian Darts Open	Winner	(Wales) Jonny Clayton	(Wales) Gerwyn Price (England) Ian White (Germany) Max Hopp
2018 European Tour	European Darts Grand Prix	Winner	(Netherlands) Michael van Gerwen	(Wales) Gerwyn Price (England) Ian White (Germany) Max Hopp
2018 European Tour	Dutch Darts Masters	Winner	(Netherlands) Michael van Gerwen	(Wales) Gerwyn Price (England) Ian White (Germany) Max Hopp
2018 European Tour	Gibraltar Darts Trophy	Winner	(Netherlands) Michael van Gerwen	(Wales) Gerwyn Price (England) Ian White (Germany) Max Hopp
2018 European Tour	Danish Darts Open	Winner	(Austria) Mensur Suljović	(Wales) Gerwyn Price (England) Ian White (Germany) Max Hopp
2018 European Tour	European Darts Matchplay	Winner	(Netherlands) Michael van Gerwen	(Wales) Gerwyn Price (England) Ian White (Germany) Max Hopp
2018 European Tour	German Darts Championship	Winner	(Netherlands) Michael van Gerwen	(Wales) Gerwyn Price (England) Ian White (Germany) Max Hopp
2018 European Tour	Dutch Darts Championship	Winner	(England) Ian White	(Wales) Gerwyn Price (England) Ian White (Germany) Max Hopp
2018 European Tour	International Darts Open	Winner	(Wales) Gerwyn Price	(Wales) Gerwyn Price (England) Ian White (Germany) Max Hopp
2018 European Tour	European Darts Trophy	Winner	(Netherlands) Michael van Gerwen	(Wales) Gerwyn Price (England) Ian White (Germany) Max Hopp
Note: Players in italics had already qualified for the tournament.				(Wales) Gerwyn Price (England) Ian White (Germany) Max Hopp

If there are still less than sixteen qualified players after the winners of European Tour events are added, the winners of 2018 Players Championships events will be added, firstly by winners of multiple events followed by Order of Merit order.

PDC Pro Tour
Tournament	Event	Position	Player	Qualifiers
2018 PDC Pro Tour
2018 PDC Pro Tour	Players Championship 1	Winner	(Netherlands) Michael van Gerwen	(Poland) Krzysztof Ratajski
2018 PDC Pro Tour	Players Championship 2	Winner	(Netherlands) Michael van Gerwen	(Poland) Krzysztof Ratajski
2018 PDC Pro Tour	Players Championship 3	Winner	(Scotland) Gary Anderson	(Poland) Krzysztof Ratajski
2018 PDC Pro Tour	Players Championship 4	Winner	(Scotland) Gary Anderson	(Poland) Krzysztof Ratajski
2018 PDC Pro Tour	Players Championship 5	Winner	(Netherlands) Michael van Gerwen	(Poland) Krzysztof Ratajski
2018 PDC Pro Tour	Players Championship 6	Winner	(England) Ian White	(Poland) Krzysztof Ratajski
2018 PDC Pro Tour	Players Championship 7	Winner	(England) Michael Smith	(Poland) Krzysztof Ratajski
2018 PDC Pro Tour	Players Championship 8	Winner	(Northern Ireland) Mickey Mansell	(Poland) Krzysztof Ratajski
2018 PDC Pro Tour	Players Championship 9	Winner	(Netherlands) Michael van Gerwen	(Poland) Krzysztof Ratajski
2018 PDC Pro Tour	Players Championship 10	Winner	(Netherlands) Jeffrey de Zwaan	(Poland) Krzysztof Ratajski
2018 PDC Pro Tour	Players Championship 11	Winner	(Scotland) Gary Anderson	(Poland) Krzysztof Ratajski
2018 PDC Pro Tour	Players Championship 12	Winner	(England) Josh Payne	(Poland) Krzysztof Ratajski
2018 PDC Pro Tour	Players Championship 13	Winner	(England) Rob Cross	(Poland) Krzysztof Ratajski
2018 PDC Pro Tour	Players Championship 14	Winner	(Scotland) Peter Wright	(Poland) Krzysztof Ratajski
2018 PDC Pro Tour	Players Championship 15	Winner	(England) Mervyn King	(Poland) Krzysztof Ratajski
2018 PDC Pro Tour	Players Championship 16	Winner	(England) Ian White	(Poland) Krzysztof Ratajski
2018 PDC Pro Tour	Players Championship 17	Winner	(Scotland) Peter Wright	(Poland) Krzysztof Ratajski
2018 PDC Pro Tour	Players Championship 18	Winner	(England) Nathan Aspinall	(Poland) Krzysztof Ratajski
2018 PDC Pro Tour	Players Championship 19	Winner	(Germany) Max Hopp	(Poland) Krzysztof Ratajski
2018 PDC Pro Tour	Players Championship 20	Winner	(Netherlands) Danny Noppert	(Poland) Krzysztof Ratajski
2018 PDC Pro Tour	Players Championship 21	Winner	(Poland) Krzysztof Ratajski	(Poland) Krzysztof Ratajski
2018 PDC Pro Tour	Players Championship 22	Winner	(Poland) Krzysztof Ratajski	(Poland) Krzysztof Ratajski
Note: Players in italics had already qualified for the tournament.				(Poland) Krzysztof Ratajski

=== PDC Qualifying Event ===
A further eight places in the Grand Slam of Darts were filled by qualifiers from a PDC qualifier that took place in Wigan on 5 November. These are the qualifiers:

- (Germany) Martin Schindler
- (England) Stephen Bunting
- (England) Andrew Gilding
- (England) Steve Hine
- (Wales) Mark Webster
- (England) Joe Murnan
- (England) Keegan Brown
- (England) Ryan Searle

=== BDO Qualifying Tournaments ===
Tournament	Year	Position	Player
BDO World Darts Championship	2018	Winner	(England) Glen Durrant
BDO World Darts Championship	2018	Runner-up	(England) Mark McGeeney
World Masters	2018	Winner	(England) Adam Smith-Neale
BDO World Trophy	2018	Winner	(England) Glen Durrant

=== BDO Ranking qualifiers ===
The remaining 5 BDO places were determined via the BDO Invitational Rankings at the end of September 2018.

- (Wales) Jim Williams
- (Netherlands) Wesley Harms
- (Germany) Michael Unterbuchner
- (England) Scott Mitchell
- (England) Gary Robson

== Pools ==
Pool A	Pool B	Pool C	Pool D
(PDC Seeded Players)	(PDC Qualifiers)		(BDO Qualifiers)
(Netherlands) Michael van Gerwen (1) (Scotland) Peter Wright (2) (England) Rob Cross (3) (Scotland) Gary Anderson (4) (England) James Wade (5) (Austria) Mensur Suljović (6) (Australia) Simon Whitlock (7) (England) Michael Smith (8)	(Belgium) Dimitri Van den Bergh (Netherlands) Raymond van Barneveld (Wales) Jonny Clayton (Wales) Gerwyn Price (England) Ian White (Germany) Max Hopp (England) Stephen Bunting (England) Keegan Brown	(England) Josh Payne (Poland) Krzysztof Ratajski (Germany) Martin Schindler (England) Andrew Gilding (England) Steve Hine (Wales) Mark Webster (England) Joe Murnan (England) Ryan Searle	(England) Glen Durrant (England) Mark McGeeney (England) Adam Smith-Neale (Wales) Jim Williams (Netherlands) Wesley Harms (Germany) Michael Unterbuchner (England) Scott Mitchell (England) Gary Robson

== Draw ==
=== Group stage ===
All group matches are best of nine legs
After three games, the top two in each group qualify for the knock-out stage

NB: P = Played; W = Won; L = Lost; LF = Legs for; LA = Legs against; +/− = Plus/minus record, in relation to legs; Pts = Points; Status = Qualified to knockout stage

==== Group A ====
Pos.	Player	P	W	L	LF	LA	+/−	Pts	Status
1	(Wales) Jonny Clayton	3	3	0	15	9	+6	6	Q
2	(Netherlands) Michael van Gerwen (1)	3	2	1	14	7	+7	4	Q
3	(England) Gary Robson (BDO)	3	1	2	9	14	–5	2	Eliminated
4	(England) Joe Murnan	3	0	3	7	15	–8	0	Eliminated

10 November

112.66 Michael van Gerwen (Netherlands)	5 – 1	(England) Gary Robson 90.76
84.44 Jonny Clayton (Wales)	5 – 2	(England) Joe Murnan 80.90

11 November

89.57 Joe Murnan (England)	4 – 5	(England) Gary Robson 88.53
107.92 Michael van Gerwen (Netherlands)	4 – 5	(Wales) Jonny Clayton 103.60

13 November

87.37 Jonny Clayton (Wales)	5 – 3	(England) Gary Robson 86.35
97.33 Michael van Gerwen (Netherlands)	5 – 1	(England) Joe Murnan 79.85

==== Group B ====
Pos.	Player	P	W	L	LF	LA	+/−	Pts	Status
1	(England) Michael Smith (8)	3	3	0	15	7	+8	6	Q
2	(Poland) Krzysztof Ratajski	3	2	1	14	9	+5	4	Q
3	(Netherlands) Raymond van Barneveld	3	1	2	8	14	–6	2	Eliminated
4	(England) Adam Smith-Neale (BDO)	3	0	3	8	15	–7	0	Eliminated

10 November

92.88 Michael Smith (England)	5 – 3	(England) Adam Smith-Neale 85.56
92.30 Raymond van Barneveld (Netherlands)	3 – 5	(Poland) Krzysztof Ratajski 90.15

11 November

88.72 Raymond van Barneveld (Netherlands)	5 – 4	(England) Adam Smith-Neale 84.76
97.26 Michael Smith (England)	5 – 4	(Poland) Krzysztof Ratajski 99.40

13 November

101.93 Krzysztof Ratajski (Poland)	5 – 1	(England) Adam Smith-Neale 88.52
98.88 Michael Smith (England)	5 – 0	(Netherlands) Raymond van Barneveld 90.96

==== Group C ====
Pos.	Player	P	W	L	LF	LA	+/−	Pts	Status
1	(England) James Wade (5)	3	3	0	15	4	+11	6	Q
2	(Netherlands) Wesley Harms (BDO)	3	2	1	10	12	–2	4	Q
3	(England) Keegan Brown	3	1	2	12	14	–2	2	Eliminated
4	(Wales) Mark Webster	3	0	3	8	15	–7	0	Eliminated

10 November

98.88 James Wade (England)	5 – 0	(Netherlands) Wesley Harms 85.88
90.40 Keegan Brown (England)	5 – 4	(Wales) Mark Webster 86.40

11 November

91.23 Mark Webster (Wales)	3 – 5	(Netherlands) Wesley Harms 88.91
104.71 James Wade (England)	5 – 3	(England) Keegan Brown 102.06

13 November

103.66 Keegan Brown (England)	4 – 5	(Netherlands) Wesley Harms 103.98
101.72 James Wade (England)	5 – 1	(Wales) Mark Webster 91.55

==== Group D ====
Pos.	Player	P	W	L	LF	LA	+/−	Pts	Status
1	(Scotland) Gary Anderson (4)	3	3	0	15	4	+11	6	Q
2	(Germany) Michael Unterbuchner (BDO)	3	2	1	12	10	+2	4	Q
3	(England) Ian White	3	1	2	9	11	–2	2	Eliminated
4	(England) Steve Hine	3	0	3	4	15	–11	0	Eliminated

10 November

90.78 Gary Anderson (Scotland)	5 – 2	(Germany) Michael Unterbuchner 78.78
104.64 Ian White (England)	5 – 1	(England) Steve Hine 92.89

11 November

89.86 Steve Hine (England)	2 – 5	(Germany) Michael Unterbuchner 97.09
112.54 Gary Anderson (Scotland)	5 – 1	(England) Ian White 86.63

13 November

91.65 Ian White (England)	3 – 5	(Germany) Michael Unterbuchner 89.83
100.13 Gary Anderson (Scotland)	5 – 1	(England) Steve Hine 85.97

==== Group E ====
Pos.	Player	P	W	L	LF	LA	+/−	Pts	Status
1	(Scotland) Peter Wright (2)	3	3	0	15	10	+5	6	Q
2	(England) Josh Payne	3	1	2	12	12	0	2	Q
3	(Germany) Max Hopp	3	1	2	11	13	–2	2	Eliminated
4	(Wales) Jim Williams (BDO)	3	1	2	11	14	–3	2	Eliminated

10 November

88.65 Peter Wright (Scotland)	5 – 4	(Wales) Jim Williams 87.30
92.76 Max Hopp (Germany)	5 – 3	(England) Josh Payne 90.12

11 November

90.20 Josh Payne (England)	5 – 2	(Wales) Jim Williams 91.91
98.46 Peter Wright (Scotland)	5 – 2	(Germany) Max Hopp 95.76

12 November

97.18 Max Hopp (Germany)	4 – 5	(Wales) Jim Williams 101.60
90.81 Peter Wright (Scotland)	5 – 4	(England) Josh Payne 86.98

==== Group F ====
Pos.	Player	P	W	L	LF	LA	+/−	Pts	Status
1	(Wales) Gerwyn Price	3	2	1	14	11	+3	4	Q
2	(Australia) Simon Whitlock (7)	3	2	1	11	11	0	4	Q
3	(England) Glen Durrant (BDO)	3	1	2	13	11	+2	2	Eliminated
4	(England) Andrew Gilding	3	1	2	9	14	–5	2	Eliminated

10 November

92.05 Simon Whitlock (Australia)	1 – 5	(England) Glen Durrant 99.20
90.24 Gerwyn Price (Wales)	5 – 2	(England) Andrew Gilding 84.49

11 November

94.11 Simon Whitlock (Australia)	5 – 2	(England) Andrew Gilding 89.56
101.60 Gerwyn Price (Wales)	5 – 4	(England) Glen Durrant 97.02

12 November

101.52 Andrew Gilding (England)	5 – 4	(England) Glen Durrant 104.98
108.86 Simon Whitlock (Australia)	5 – 4	(Wales) Gerwyn Price 104.58

==== Group G ====
Pos.	Player	P	W	L	LF	LA	+/−	Pts	Status
1	(England) Stephen Bunting	3	3	0	15	7	+8	6	Q
2	(Austria) Mensur Suljović (6)	3	1	2	12	12	0	2	Q
3	(England) Scott Mitchell (BDO)	3	1	2	8	11	–3	2	Eliminated
4	(Germany) Martin Schindler	3	1	2	9	14	–5	2	Eliminated

10 November

94.24 Mensur Suljović (Austria)	5 – 2	(England) Scott Mitchell 89.53
91.00 Stephen Bunting (England)	5 – 3	(Germany) Martin Schindler 84.83

11 November

88.42 Martin Schindler (Germany)	1 – 5	(England) Scott Mitchell 97.76
101.94 Mensur Suljović (Austria)	3 – 5	(England) Stephen Bunting 104.36

12 November

89.97 Stephen Bunting (England)	5 – 1	(England) Scott Mitchell 91.35
90.41 Mensur Suljović (Austria)	4 – 5	(Germany) Martin Schindler 87.06

==== Group H ====
Pos.	Player	P	W	L	LF	LA	+/−	Pts	Status
1	(England) Rob Cross (3)	3	3	0	15	8	+7	6	Q
2	(Belgium) Dimitri Van den Bergh	3	2	1	14	9	+5	4	Q
3	(England) Mark McGeeney (BDO)	3	1	2	8	13	–5	2	Eliminated
4	(England) Ryan Searle	3	0	3	8	15	–7	0	Eliminated

10 November

87.49 Rob Cross (England)	5 – 2	(England) Mark McGeeney 79.63
95.67 Dimitri Van den Bergh (Belgium)	5 – 3	(England) Ryan Searle 89.19

11 November

83.56 Ryan Searle (England)	3 – 5	(England) Mark McGeeney 92.93
98.08 Rob Cross (England)	5 – 4	(Belgium) Dimitri Van den Bergh 100.11

12 November

98.90 Dimitri Van den Bergh (Belgium)	5 – 1	(England) Mark McGeeney 95.75
98.70 Rob Cross (England)	5 – 2	(England) Ryan Searle 88.66

=== Knockout stage ===
Second round (best of 19 legs); 14–15 November
A1	(Wales) Jonny Clayton 103.65	10
B2	(Poland) Krzysztof Ratajski 94.08	3
B1	(England) Michael Smith (8) 100.69	8
A2	(Netherlands) Michael van Gerwen (1) 108.32	10
C1	(England) James Wade (5) 93.76	6
D2	(Germany) Michael Unterbuchner (BDO) 93.57	10
D1	(Scotland) Gary Anderson (4) 101.22	10
C2	(Netherlands) Wesley Harms (BDO) 87.97	2
E1	(Scotland) Peter Wright (2) 93.86	6
F2	(Australia) Simon Whitlock (7) 94.95	10
F1	(Wales) Gerwyn Price 93.37	10
E2	(England) Josh Payne 84.10	5
G1	(England) Stephen Bunting 88.14	6
H2	(Belgium) Dimitri Van den Bergh 90.16	10
H1	(England) Rob Cross (3) 92.23	7
G2	(Austria) Mensur Suljović (6) 93.63	10

Quarter-finals (best of 31 legs); 16–17 November
A1	(Wales) Jonny Clayton 95.88	12
A2	(Netherlands) Michael van Gerwen (1) 101.65	16
D2	(Germany) Michael Unterbuchner (BDO) 88.52	6
D1	(Scotland) Gary Anderson (4) 100.48	16
F2	(Australia) Simon Whitlock (7) 95.03	15
F1	(Wales) Gerwyn Price 95.86	16
H2	(Belgium) Dimitri Van den Bergh 94.28	9
G2	(Austria) Mensur Suljović (6) 98.58	16

Semi-finals (best of 31 legs); 18 November
A2	(Netherlands) Michael van Gerwen (1) 99.05	12
D1	(Scotland) Gary Anderson (4) 102.97	16
F1	(Wales) Gerwyn Price 97.06	16
G2	(Austria) Mensur Suljović (6) 98.08	12

Final (best of 31 legs); 18 November
D1	(Scotland) Gary Anderson (4) 97.25	13
F1	(Wales) Gerwyn Price 96.70	16
