= 2018 World Matchplay =

2018 BetVictor World Matchplay

Tournament information
- Dates: 21–29 July 2018
- Venue: Winter Gardens
- Location: Blackpool, England
- Organisation(s): Professional Darts Corporation (PDC)
- Format: Legs
- Prize fund: £500,000
- Winner's share: £115,000
- Nine-dart finish: Gary Anderson
- High checkout: 170 Joe Cullen (x2); Peter Wright

Champion(s)
- (Scotland) Gary Anderson

The 2018 BetVictor World Matchplay was the 25th annual staging of the World Matchplay, organised by the Professional Darts Corporation. The tournament took place at the Winter Gardens, Blackpool, from 21–29 July 2018.

Phil Taylor was the defending champion, after defeating Peter Wright 18–8 in the 2017 final to claim his 16th World Matchplay title, but he retired following the 2018 PDC World Darts Championship final. For the first time, the winner of the tournament, (Gary Anderson) received the Phil Taylor Trophy, which was renamed in his honour in January 2018.

Gary Anderson hit a nine dart finish in the fourth leg of his quarter-final match against Joe Cullen, which was the seventh nine-dart finish in the World Matchplay and the first since 2014. Anderson overcame Cullen 19–17, facing two match darts against him at 15–14 to Cullen.

Anderson went on to win his first World Matchplay title, defeating Mensur Suljović, 21–19 after extra time in the longest final in the tournament's history.

The first round match between Kim Huybrechts and John Henderson made a piece of World Matchplay history, as it was the first time that a match was won by a single leg since the 1997 3rd place play-off. Huybrechts won the match 13–12 in a sudden-death leg, the first time the rule had been needed since it was introduced in 2013.

For the first time in World Matchplay history, no Englishmen progressed into the semi-finals, resulting in a first Matchplay final without an English player.

== Prize money ==
The prize fund remained at £500,000, with the winner's earnings being £115,000. Gary Anderson received £45,000 for hitting a nine-dart finish in his quarter-final against Joe Cullen.

| Position (no. of players) | | Prize money (Total: £500,000) |
|---|---|---|
| Winner | (1) | £115,000 |
| Runner-up | (1) | £55,000 |
| Semi-finalists | (2) | £30,000 |
| Quarter-finalists | (4) | £17,500 |
| Second round | (8) | £11,000 |
| First round | (16) | £7,000 |
| Nine-dart finish | (1) | £45,000 |

== Format ==
In previous stagings of the event all games had to be won by two clear legs with no sudden-death legs. However, after consulting the host broadcaster Sky Sports in 2013, the PDC decided that games will now only proceed for a maximum of six extra legs before a tie-break leg is required. For example, in a best of 19 legs first round match, if the score reaches 12–12 then the 25th leg will be the decider.

== Qualification ==
The top 16 players on the PDC Order of Merit as of 2 July 2018 were seeded for the tournament. The top 16 players on the ProTour Order of Merit not to have already qualified were unseeded.

The following players qualified for the tournament:

=== PDC Order of Merit Top 16 ===
1. (Netherlands) Michael van Gerwen (first round)
2. (Scotland) Peter Wright (semi-finals)
3. (England) Rob Cross (second round)
4. (Scotland) Gary Anderson (champion)
5. (Northern Ireland) Daryl Gurney (second round)
6. (Austria) Mensur Suljović (runner-up)
7. (Australia) Simon Whitlock (quarter-finals)
8. (England) Dave Chisnall (quarter-finals)
9. (England) Michael Smith (second round)
10. (England) James Wade (second round)
11. (England) Ian White (second round)
12. (Wales) Gerwyn Price (first round)
13. (Netherlands) Raymond van Barneveld (second round)
14. (England) Darren Webster (quarter-finals)
15. (Belgium) Kim Huybrechts (second round)
16. (England) Adrian Lewis (second round)

=== PDC Pro Tour qualifiers ===
1. (Wales) Jonny Clayton (first round)
2. (England) Joe Cullen (quarter-finals)
3. (England) Stephen Bunting (first round)
4. (Germany) Max Hopp (first round)
5. (England) Mervyn King (first round)
6. (Netherlands) Jermaine Wattimena (first round)
7. (England) Steve West (first round)
8. (England) Steve Beaton (first round)
9. (Australia) Kyle Anderson (first round)
10. (England) James Wilson (first round)
11. (Scotland) John Henderson (first round)
12. (England) Keegan Brown (first round)
13. (Netherlands) Jelle Klaasen (first round)
14. (Republic of Ireland) Steve Lennon (first round)
15. (Netherlands) Jeffrey de Zwaan (semi-finals)
16. (England) Richard North (first round)

== Draw ==
First round (best of 19 legs); 21–23 July
1 | (Netherlands) Michael van Gerwen 97.88 | 6
(Netherlands) Jeffrey de Zwaan 94.42 | 10
16 | (England) Adrian Lewis 93.61 | 10
(England) James Wilson 87.72 | 8
8 | (England) Dave Chisnall 94.09 | 10
(England) Keegan Brown 76.62 | 4
9 | (England) Michael Smith 97.43 | 10
(Wales) Jonny Clayton 84.06 | 6
5 | (Northern Ireland) Daryl Gurney 89.19 | 12
(England) Steve West 91.79 | 10
12 | (Wales) Gerwyn Price 90.23 | 3
(England) Joe Cullen 91.39 | 10
4 | (Scotland) Gary Anderson 96.66 | 10
(England) Stephen Bunting 86.21 | 7
13 | (Netherlands) Raymond van Barneveld 90.67 | 10
(Australia) Kyle Anderson 90.69 | 6
2 | (Scotland) Peter Wright 89.28 | 10
(Netherlands) Jelle Klaasen 84.36 | 5
15 | (Belgium) Kim Huybrechts 94.17 | 13
(Scotland) John Henderson 91.00 | 12
7 | (Australia) Simon Whitlock 88.20 | 10
(England) Richard North 80.40 | 2
10 | (England) James Wade 89.60 | 12
(Netherlands) Jermaine Wattimena 87.63 | 10
6 | (Austria) Mensur Suljović 93.00 | 10
(England) Steve Beaton 90.92 | 6
11 | (England) Ian White 92.58 | 10
(Germany) Max Hopp 90.51 | 7
3 | (England) Rob Cross 98.58 | 10
(England) Mervyn King 91.85 | 5
14 | (England) Darren Webster 91.95 | 10
(Republic of Ireland) Steve Lennon 91.00 | 6

Second round (best of 21 legs); 24–25 July
(Netherlands) Jeffrey de Zwaan 98.99 | 11
16 | (England) Adrian Lewis 103.86 | 9
8 | (England) Dave Chisnall 103.02 | 11
9 | (England) Michael Smith 98.11 | 8
5 | (Northern Ireland) Daryl Gurney 87.69 | 3
(England) Joe Cullen 99.65 | 11
4 | (Scotland) Gary Anderson 104.17 | 11
13 | (Netherlands) Raymond van Barneveld 95.29 | 9
2 | (Scotland) Peter Wright 105.60 | 11
15 | (Belgium) Kim Huybrechts 96.16 | 5
7 | (Australia) Simon Whitlock 93.96 | 11
10 | (England) James Wade 90.88 | 7
6 | (Austria) Mensur Suljović 97.21 | 11
11 | (England) Ian White 93.51 | 8
3 | (England) Rob Cross 98.81 | 8
14 | (England) Darren Webster 93.39 | 11

Quarter-finals (best of 31 legs); 26–27 July
(Netherlands) Jeffrey de Zwaan 103.22 | 16
8 | (England) Dave Chisnall 99.05 | 8
(England) Joe Cullen 95.26 | 17
4 | (Scotland) Gary Anderson 97.13 | 19
2 | (Scotland) Peter Wright 101.35 | 16
7 | (Australia) Simon Whitlock 96.14 | 5
6 | (Austria) Mensur Suljović 98.03 | 16
14 | (England) Darren Webster 95.70 | 10

Semi-finals (best of 33 legs); 28 July
(Netherlands) Jeffrey de Zwaan 99.12 | 12
4 | (Scotland) Gary Anderson 106.06 | 17
2 | (Scotland) Peter Wright 88.68 | 13
6 | (Austria) Mensur Suljović 90.16 | 17

Final (best of 35 legs); 29 July
4 | (Scotland) Gary Anderson 101.12 | 21
6 | (Austria) Mensur Suljović 104.43 | 19

== Statistics ==
| Player | Eliminated | Played | Legs Won | Legs Lost | 100+ | 140+ | 180s | High checkout | 3-dart average | Checkout success |
|---|---|---|---|---|---|---|---|---|---|---|
| (Scotland) Gary Anderson | Winner | 5 | 78 | 64 | 169 | 96 | 52 | 152 | 100.88 | 36.45% |
| (Austria) Mensur Suljović | Final | 5 | 73 | 58 | 173 | 108 | 35 | 151 | 97.16 | 40.56% |
| (Netherlands) Jeffrey de Zwaan | Semi-finals | 4 | 49 | 40 | 106 | 68 | 23 | 140 | 99.12 | 42.86% |
| (Scotland) Peter Wright | Semi-finals | 4 | 50 | 32 | 108 | 73 | 11 | 170 | 88.68 | 37.14% |
| (England) Dave Chisnall | Quarter-finals | 3 | 29 | 28 | 58 | 38 | 21 | 148 | 99.05 | 47.06% |
| (Australia) Simon Whitlock | Quarter-finals | 3 | 26 | 25 | 58 | 26 | 15 | 132 | 96.14 | 38.46% |
| (England) Darren Webster | Quarter-finals | 3 | 31 | 30 | 89 | 45 | 11 | 138 | 95.70 | 41.67% |
| (England) Joe Cullen | Quarter-finals | 3 | 38 | 25 | 77 | 39 | 10 | 170 | 95.26 | 41.46% |
| (England) Adrian Lewis | Second round | 2 | 19 | 19 | 44 | 16 | 6 | 121 | 103.86 | 40.91% |
| (England) Rob Cross | Second round | 2 | 18 | 19 | 39 | 28 | 9 | 156 | 98.81 | 27.59% |
| (England) Michael Smith | Second round | 2 | 22 | 20 | 35 | 24 | 14 | 110 | 98.11 | 40.00% |
| (Belgium) Kim Huybrechts | Second round | 2 | 16 | 23 | 40 | 27 | 12 | 156 | 96.16 | 33.33% |
| (Netherlands) Raymond van Barneveld | Second round | 2 | 19 | 17 | 39 | 15 | 9 | 130 | 95.29 | 69.23% |
| (England) Ian White | Second round | 2 | 18 | 18 | 44 | 22 | 12 | 154 | 93.51 | 50.00% |
| (England) James Wade | Second round | 2 | 19 | 21 | 64 | 29 | 4 | 149 | 90.88 | 24.14% |
| (Northern Ireland) Daryl Gurney | Second round | 2 | 15 | 21 | 52 | 16 | 4 | 100 | 87.69 | 25.00% |
| (Netherlands) Michael van Gerwen | First round | 1 | 6 | 10 | 16 | 8 | 6 | 100 | 97.88 | 35.29% |
| (England) Mervyn King | First round | 1 | 5 | 10 | 15 | 9 | 5 | 72 | 91.85 | 41.67% |
| (England) Steve West | First round | 1 | 10 | 12 | 23 | 18 | 6 | 108 | 91.79 | 31.25% |
| (Scotland) John Henderson | First round | 1 | 12 | 13 | 30 | 13 | 3 | 114 | 91.00 | 52.17% |
| (Republic of Ireland) Steve Lennon | First round | 1 | 6 | 10 | 24 | 10 | 2 | 124 | 91.00 | 37.50% |
| (England) Steve Beaton | First round | 1 | 6 | 10 | 24 | 11 | 1 | 120 | 90.92 | 46.15% |
| (Australia) Kyle Anderson | First round | 1 | 6 | 10 | 14 | 9 | 5 | 90 | 90.69 | 33.33% |
| (Germany) Max Hopp | First round | 1 | 7 | 10 | 23 | 16 | 1 | 80 | 90.51 | 46.67% |
| (Wales) Gerwyn Price | First round | 1 | 3 | 10 | 8 | 5 | 5 | 99 | 90.23 | 23.08% |
| (England) James Wilson | First round | 1 | 8 | 10 | 19 | 12 | 2 | 86 | 87.72 | 44.44% |
| (Netherlands) Jermaine Wattimena | First round | 1 | 10 | 12 | 24 | 16 | 1 | 113 | 87.63 | 29.41% |
| (England) Stephen Bunting | First round | 1 | 7 | 10 | 8 | 11 | 3 | 110 | 86.21 | 46.67% |
| (Netherlands) Jelle Klaasen | First round | 1 | 5 | 10 | 13 | 7 | 1 | 40 | 84.36 | 31.25% |
| (Wales) Jonny Clayton | First round | 1 | 6 | 10 | 15 | 8 | 3 | 154 | 84.06 | 54.55% |
| (England) Richard North | First round | 1 | 2 | 10 | 8 | 10 | 1 | 80 | 80.40 | 50.00% |
| (England) Keegan Brown | First round | 1 | 4 | 10 | 14 | 3 | 1 | 109 | 76.62 | 33.33% |

Source: Match reports from the draw.
