= Cristo Reyes =

Spanish darts player (born 1987)

Personal information
- Full name: Cristo Reyes Torres
- Nickname: "The Spartan"
- Born: 30 July 1987 (age 39) San Cristóbal, Spain
- Home town: Santa Cruz de Tenerife, Spain

Sport
- Sport: Darts
- Playing since: 2007
- Darts: 21g Bull's Germany Signature
- Laterality: Right-handed
- Walk-on music: "Hall of Fame" by The Script ft. will.i.am

Organisation (see split in darts)
- PDC: 2014–2022, 2025–present (Tour Card: 2015–2021; 2026–present)
- Current world ranking: (PDC) 65 ▲3 (5 November 2026)

PDC premier events – best performances
- World Championship: Last 16: 2015
- World Matchplay: Last 16: 2017
- World Grand Prix: Last 32: 2016, 2017
- UK Open: Last 16: 2019
- European Championship: Last 16: 2015, 2016, 2018
- PC Finals: Last 32: 2018

Cristo Reyes Torres (born 30 July 1987) is a Spanish darts player who competes in Professional Darts Corporation (PDC) events. A PDC Tour Card holder, he has reached the last 16 in six PDC ranked televised events, including the World Championship in 2015.

== Career ==
In October 2014, Reyes bested a field of 154 players to win the Iberian Qualifier for the 2015 PDC World Championship, sealing his place in the draw by whitewashing Jose Rodriguez 6–0 in the final. He entered the event in the preliminary round and comfortably beat Christian Perez 4–0. Reyes then took the first two sets against Wes Newton, before the world number 13 responded to level the tie. Both players broke each other's throw in the deciding set, with the match going in to a sudden death leg. Reyes' first dart hit the outer bull as in a sudden death leg both players throw a dart at the bull to decide who throws first. However, the referee did not realise this and Reyes was made to continue the leg until the refereeing team stepped in to restart it after both players had thrown six darts. Reyes again hit the outer bull to throw first and won the match by hitting double 16 at the first time of asking to complete a huge shock. Newton branded the refereeing a joke but praised Reyes for having better composure in the same situation.

Reyes made history in the next round as he became the first Spanish player to make it to the third round of the PDC World Championship. He fought back from 3–1 down against Kevin Painter to beat him 4–3, winning the final set without reply. Reyes averaged 115 in taking the first set of his third round match with Gary Anderson, before Anderson responded with four straight sets to end Reyes' tournament. Reyes missed three darts to extend the game into a sixth set, with Anderson's final average of 104.54 being the second highest of the tournament. Former world number one Rod Harrington suggested Reyes' performances in the event would result in the emergence of more Iberian darts players in the future.

As a result of his World Championship performance and the non-renewal of Tour Cards by Richie Burnett and Jarkko Komula, Reyes picked up a PDC Tour Card for the first time in January 2015. He threw a nine-dart finish in the last 16 of the second Players Championship event, but would go on to lose the match 6–2 against Robert Thornton. Reyes was now the number one Spanish player on the Order of Merit and he teamed up with Antonio Alcinas at the World Cup of Darts. In Reyes' debut in the event they whitewashed Norway 5–0 in the opening round but lost their single matches to the Belgium brothers Kim and Ronny Huybrechts in the second round. In his first European Championship, Reyes averaged 100.69 in defeating Max Hopp 6–2, but was then heavily beaten 10–3 by Michael van Gerwen. He was consistent on the Pro Tour during the year with a number of last 16 finishes amassing him £18,000 on the Order of Merit. This saw him qualify for the 2016 World Championship and a first round rematch from last year with Wes Newton. Reyes relinquished the first set from two legs to none up (missing seven set darts in total) despite Newton averaging just 67.31 and went on to lose 3–1.

Reyes was beaten 6–4 by Andrew Davidson in the second round of the 2016 UK Open. At the fifth Players Championship event he reached the quarter-finals of a Pro Tour event for the first time and was edged out 6–5 by Robbie Green. A 6–2 win over Mensur Suljović saw him advance to the semi-finals of the 11th event, where he lost 6–4 to Joe Cullen. A win would have seen Reyes qualify for the World Matchplay. Two further quarter-finals did see him qualify for the World Grand Prix for the first time and his first round match went to a deciding leg, which Kyle Anderson won. A 6–4 win over Robert Thornton saw Reyes reach the second round of the European Championship for the second year in a row and he lost 10–7 to Peter Wright. Reyes closed out the major events of 2016 with a 6–5 loss to Berry van Peer in the opening round of the Players Championship Finals.

Reyes had a checkout percentage of 60 as he edged out Dimitri Van den Bergh 3–2 at the 2017 World Championship and faced Michael van Gerwen in round two. He missed one dart against Van Gerwen to square the match at 3–3 and lost 4–2 despite averaging a superior 106.07. This set a new record for the highest losing average at the World Championships for a few days until Raymond van Barneveld was eliminated by Van Gerwen in the semi-finals with him averaging 109.34. Reyes and Toni Alcinas were whitewashed 4–0 in the deciding doubles match in the second round of the World Cup to the Singapore team of Paul Lim and Harith Lim.

In November 2025, Reyes qualified for the 2026 World Championship, his first World Championship in six years, by beating Ricardo Perez 7–4 in the final of the Mediterranean qualifier. He lost 3–1 to eventual finalist Gian van Veen in the first round. In January 2026, Reyes secured a two-year tour card at Q-School, returning to the circuit for the first time since 2021.

== World Championship results ==
=== PDC ===
- 2015: Third round (lost to Gary Anderson 1–4)
- 2016: First round (lost to Wes Newton 1–3)
- 2017: Second round (lost to Michael van Gerwen 2–4)
- 2018: First round (lost to Toni Alcinas 1–3)
- 2019: Third round (lost to Rob Cross 0–4)
- 2020: Second round (lost to Adrian Lewis 2–3)
- 2026: First round (lost to Gian van Veen 1–3)

== Performance timeline ==
Cristo Reyes' performance timeline is as follows:

Tournament	2015	2016	2017	2018	2019	2020	2026
PDC Ranked televised events
World Championship	3R	1R	2R	1R	3R	2R	1R
UK Open	DNQ	2R	4R	1R	6R	3R	3R
World Matchplay	DNQ		2R	Did not qualify			
World Grand Prix	DNQ	1R	1R	Did not qualify			
European Championship	2R	2R	1R	2R	DNQ		1R
Players Championship Finals	DNQ	1R	1R	2R	1R	DNQ	
PDC Non-ranked televised events
World Cup	2R	1R	2R	2R	1R	DNP	2R
World Series Finals	DNQ	2R	Did not qualify				

=== PDC European Tour ===
Season	1	2	3	4	5	6	7	8	9	10	11	12	13	14	15
2015	GDC; 1R	GIB; 2R	GDM; 1R	DDM; 1R	IDO; 2R	EDO; DNQ	EDT; 3R	DNQ							
2016	DDM; DNQ	GDM; 3R	GIB; 1R	EDM; 1R	ADO; DNQ	EDO; 1R	IDO; DNQ	EDT; 1R	EDG; 2R	GDC; 3R					
2017	GDC; 3R	GDM; 3R	GDO; 3R	EDG; 2R	GDT; 3R	EDM; SF	ADO; SF	EDO; 1R	DDM; 2R	GDG; DNP	IDO; 2R	EDT; DNQ			
2018	Did not qualify			ADO; 3R	EDG; DNQ	DDM; 2R	GIB; 2R	DDO; 2R	EDM; 1R	GDC; 2R	DDC; 2R	DNQ			
2019	DNQ		GDG; 2R	Did not qualify											
2026	PDO; 3R	EDT; 1R	BDO; 3R	DNQ		ADO; QF	IDO; 1R	BSD; 1R	SDO; 1R	EDO; DNQ	HDT; 1R	CDO; 1R	FDT; 1R	SDT; QF	DDC; 3R

=== PDC Players Championships ===
Season	1	2	3	4	5	6	7	8	9	10	11	12	13	14	15	16	17	18	19	20	21	22	23	24	25	26	27	28	29	30	31	32	33	34
2016	BAR; 2R	BAR; 2R	BAR; 1R	BAR; 3R	BAR; QF	BAR; 1R	BAR; 1R	COV; 4R	COV; 2R	BAR; 1R	BAR; SF	BAR; 3R	BAR; 4R	BAR; 1R	BAR; QF	BAR; QF	DUB; 1R	DUB; 3R	BAR; 3R	BAR; 3R														
2017	BAR; QF	BAR; 4R	BAR; 2R	BAR; 3R	MIL; 4R	MIL; 4R	BAR; 3R	BAR; 3R	WIG; 3R	WIG; 1R	MIL; 3R	MIL; 1R	WIG; 1R	WIG; 2R	BAR; 1R	BAR; 3R	BAR; DNP		DUB; 2R	DUB; 1R	BAR; 1R	BAR; 2R												
2018	BAR; 1R	BAR; 2R	BAR; 1R	BAR; 3R	MIL; 1R	MIL; 3R	BAR; 4R	BAR; 2R	WIG; 2R	WIG; 2R	MIL; 1R	MIL; 2R	WIG; 2R	WIG; 2R	BAR; 2R	BAR; 2R	BAR; 3R	BAR; 1R	DUB; 2R	DUB; 1R	BAR; DNP													
2019	WIG; 2R	WIG; 1R	WIG; 1R	WIG; 1R	BAR; 2R	BAR; 2R	WIG; 3R	WIG; 4R	BAR; 1R	BAR; 1R	BAR; 4R	BAR; 2R	BAR; 4R	BAR; 1R	BAR; 3R	BAR; 1R	WIG; 3R	WIG; 3R	BAR; 3R	BAR; 2R	HIL; 2R	HIL; 1R	BAR; 1R	BAR; 3R	BAR; 1R	BAR; QF	DUB; QF	DUB; 2R	BAR; 1R	BAR; 3R				
2020	BAR; 1R	BAR; 1R	WIG; DNP		WIG; 1R	WIG; 4R	BAR; 1R	Did not participate																										
2026	HIL; 1R	HIL; 3R	WIG; 4R	WIG; 1R	LEI; 1R	LEI; 1R	LEI; 4R	LEI; 1R	WIG; 2R	WIG; 1R	MIL; 4R	MIL; 2R	HIL; 2R	HIL; 3R	LEI; 2R	LEI; 2R	LEI; 2R	LEI; 1R	MIL; QF	MIL; 4R	WIG; 2R	WIG; 4R	LEI; F	LEI; 2R	HIL; 4R	HIL; 3R	LEI; 1R	LEI; 3R	ROS; 4R	ROS; 1R	ROS; 3R	ROS; 2R	LEI; 1R	LEI; SF

Key

Performance Table Legend
W	Won the tournament	F	Finalist	SF	Semifinalist	QF	Quarterfinalist	#R; RR; Prel.	Lost in # round Round-robin; Preliminary round	DQ	Disqualified
DNQ	Did not qualify	DNP	Did not participate	WD	Withdrew	NH	Tournament not held	#R; RR; Prel.	Lost in # round Round-robin; Preliminary round	NYF	Not yet founded
