= Mensur Suljović =

Darts player (born 1972)

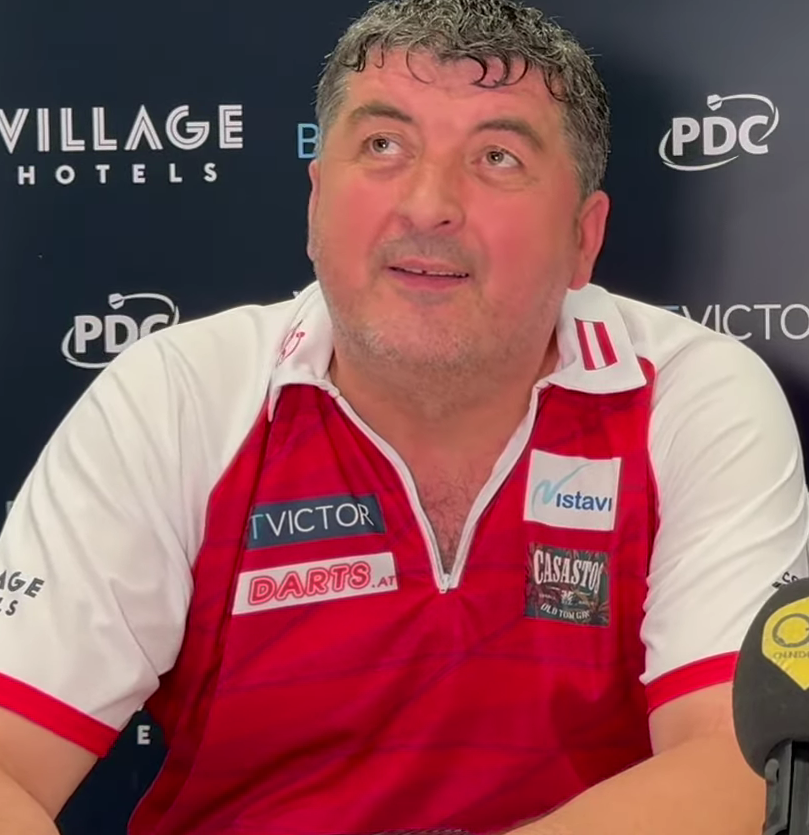
- Suljović in 2024

Personal information
- Nickname: "The Gentle"
- Born: 5 March 1972 (age 54) Tutin, SR Serbia, Yugoslavia
- Home town: Vienna, Austria

Sport
- Sport: Darts
- Playing since: 1989
- Darts: 23g Legend Signature
- Laterality: Right-handed
- Walk-on music: "The Best" by Tina Turner

Organisation (see split in darts)
- BDO: 1999–2007
- PDC: 2007–present (Tour Card: 2011–present)
- Current world ranking: (PDC) 55 ▼1 (29 October 2026)

WDF major events – best performances
- World Championship: Last 16: 2002
- World Masters: Quarter-final: 2001

PDC premier events – best performances
- World Championship: Last 16: 2011, 2016, 2018
- World Matchplay: Runner-up: 2018
- World Grand Prix: Semi-final: 2015, 2017, 2018
- UK Open: Quarter-final: 2014, 2015
- Grand Slam: Semi-final: 2018
- European Championship: Runner-up: 2016
- Premier League: 6th: 2019
- PC Finals: Semi-final: 2015
- Masters: Semi-final: 2018
- Champions League: Winner (1): 2017
- World Series Finals: Semi-final: 2019

Other tournament wins
- Years
| Bullshooter European Championship (×3) | 1999, 2000, 2004 |
| SDWF European Championship | 2004 |
| Bullshooter World Championship | 2005 |
BDO/WDF Events (×7)
| Austrian Open (×2) | 2000, 2001 |
| Czech Open (×2) | 1998, 1999 |
| Dortmund Open | 2000 |
| German Gold Cup | 2003 |
| Hungarian Open | 2003 |
European Tour Events (×3)
| Austrian Darts Championship | 2019 |
| Danish Darts Open | 2018 |
| International Darts Open | 2016 |
Players Championships (×2)
| 2017, 2019 |
World Series of Darts (×1)
| German Darts Masters | 2018 |
German Darts Corporation (×5)
| 2007 (×3), 2008 (×2) |
Medal record
Men's Darts
Representing Austria
EDF European Championship
| Gold medal – first place | 2012 Podčetrtek | Men's singles |
| Gold medal – first place | 2012 Podčetrtek | Men's cricket |
| Gold medal – first place | 2012 Podčetrtek | Men's doubles |
| Gold medal – first place | 2012 Podčetrtek | Mixed doubles |
| Gold medal – first place | 2014 Podčetrtek | Men's doubles |
| Gold medal – first place | 2015 Santa Susanna | Men's cricket |
| Gold medal – first place | 2016 Podčetrtek | Men's singles |
| Gold medal – first place | 2016 Podčetrtek | Men's cricket |
| Gold medal – first place | 2016 Podčetrtek | Men's doubles |
| Gold medal – first place | 2018 Podčetrtek | Men's doubles |
| Gold medal – first place | 2019 Podčetrtek | Men's doubles |
| Gold medal – first place | 2026 Podčetrtek | Men's cricket |
| Silver medal – second place | 2013 Podčetrtek | Mixed doubles |
| Silver medal – second place | 2016 Podčetrtek | Mixed doubles |
| Silver medal – second place | 2024 Podčetrtek | Men's singles |
| Bronze medal – third place | 2014 Podčetrtek | Mixed doubles |
| Bronze medal – third place | 2015 Santa Susanna | Men's singles |
| Bronze medal – third place | 2015 Santa Susanna | Men's doubles |
| Bronze medal – third place | 2024 Podčetrtek | Men's doubles |
| Bronze medal – third place | 2026 Podčetrtek | Men's doubles |
EDU European Championship
| Gold medal – first place | 2000 Riccione | Men's singles |
| Gold medal – first place | 2003 Salou | Men's singles |
| Gold medal – first place | 2004 Hamburg | Men's singles |
| Gold medal – first place | 2004 Hamburg | Men's cricket |
| Gold medal – first place | 2005 Sopron | Men's singles |
| Gold medal – first place | 2008 Hamburg | Men's cricket |
| Silver medal – second place | 2000 Riccione | Men's cricket |
| Silver medal – second place | 2003 Salou | Men's cricket |
| Silver medal – second place | 2006 Umag | Men's cricket |
| Silver medal – second place | 2007 Prague | Men's cricket |
| Silver medal – second place | 2008 Caorle | Men's singles |

Mensur Suljović (Serbian Cyrillic: Менсур Суљовић; born 5 March 1972) is a professional darts player who competes under the Austrian flag in Professional Darts Corporation (PDC) events, where he reached a peak ranking of world number five in 2017. Nicknamed "the Gentle", Suljović reached his first PDC major televised final in 2016, finishing as the runner-up at the European Championship. He won his first TV title at the 2017 Champions League of Darts, defeating Gary Anderson in the final. He finished as the runner-up at the 2018 World Matchplay. Suljović has also won a total of 7 PDC titles in his professional career, including 3 titles on the PDC European Tour.

He previously participated in British Darts Organisation (BDO) and World Darts Federation (WDF) tournaments, winning 7 titles. He reached the quarter-finals at the World Masters in 2001 and the last 16 at the 2002 BDO World Championship.

Suljović was runner-up at the PDC World Cup of Darts in both 2021 and 2024, partnering Rowby-John Rodriguez for Austria and has been ranked as the number one Austrian player in the PDC, but he does not actually hold Austrian citizenship.

Suljović is noted for his unorthodox throwing action and favouring double 14 as his finishing double where possible.

== Personal life ==
Suljović has been living in Vienna since 1993. He left Serbia during the break-up of Yugoslavia to live in Austria together with his older brothers. They owned a coffee shop where he started playing darts. He is married to Enisa with two children and owns his own pub called The Gentle in Vienna. Although he represents Austria, he does not have Austrian citizenship. He applied two times without success in 2014 and 2020. The reason for the first rejection was that his pub employed a waitress who had no work permit, the reason for the second was that his tax consultant missed the tax filing deadline.

== Career ==
=== BDO ===
Suljović first appeared at the Winmau World Masters in 1999, reaching the last 16. He defeated Ronnie Baxter before losing to eventual winner Andy Fordham. Two years later he went one step further, beating Colin Monk and Martin Adams en route to the quarter finals, losing to Raymond van Barneveld, who like Andy Fordham in 1999, went on to win the tournament. He made his only BDO World Darts Championship appearance in 2002, beating quickfire Dutchman Vincent van der Voort in round one, but lost in the last 16 to Mervyn King. He made one more appearance at the World Masters in 2003, but lost in the Last 64 stage to Welshman John Burton.

=== PDC ===
Suljović qualified for the 2008 PDC World Darts Championship through the German Darts Corporation Order of Merit. He defeated Andy Smith in round one but lost in the second round to eventual winner John Part. He then qualified for the inaugural European Championship where he beat Roland Scholten in the first round, but lost in the second round to Robert Thornton.

Suljović topped the GDC rankings for a second straight year and played in the 2009 PDC World Darts Championship where he beat Peter Manley in the first round and lost 4–0 to Mark Dudbridge in the second round. With other results falling his way, Suljović moved into the top 50 of the PDC Order of Merit.

In 2009 the GDC was replaced with the European Order of Merit, but Suljović still continued to perform well, including another second round showing in the European Championship, again beating Scholten in the first round but losing to Colin Lloyd. His consistent performances on the European tour earned him qualification for the 2010 PDC World Darts Championship but he lost in the first round to 2004 finalist Kevin Painter.

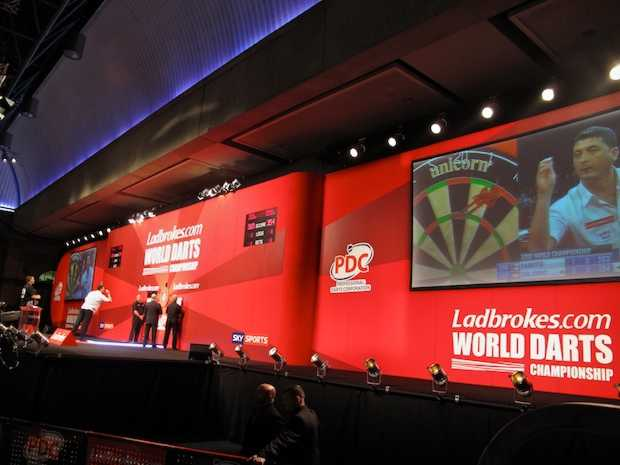
Suljović at the 2010 PDC World Championship

His performances in 2010 did not match previous years. He attempted to qualify for the 2010 UK Open but was unsuccessful and also failed to qualify for the 2010 European Championship.

However, Suljović qualified for the 2011 PDC World Darts Championship and defeated Michael van Gerwen by 3 sets to 1 in the first round. Following that, he upset world #2 James Wade 4–2 in the last 32. In the round of 16, he was beaten 4–0 by Wes Newton and bowed out of the competition.

Suljović did not advance beyond the first round of the 2012 World Championship, as he was defeated 1–3 by Paul Nicholson. He represented Austria with Dietmar Burger in the 2012 PDC World Cup of Darts and together they were beaten 1–3 by the Netherlands in the second round, having defeated New Zealand in round 1. Suljović centred the rest of his 2012 season around the five new European Tour events, qualifying for four of them. Out of those he lost in the first round in three and in the other, the German Darts Championship, he beat James Wade 6–5, before losing to Kim Huybrechts 3–6. He also qualified for the European Championship via the European Order of Merit, but was defeated by Jerry Hendriks 2–6 in the first round. Suljović was knocked out in the semi-finals of the Central European Qualifier for the 2013 World Championship and began 2013 ranked world number 59.

Suljović played in his third World Cup of Darts and second with Maik Langendorf in February 2013, but they finished bottom of Group A, losing to Japan 4–5 and England 2–5. He lost in the last 16 of the first European Tour event of 2013 to John Part 5–6. At the next event, the European Darts Trophy, Suljović had his best ever result on the PDC circuit by reaching the semi-finals. He saw off Scott Rand (6–5), Michael Smith (6–4), Andy Smith (6–0) and Kim Huybrechts (6–4), before losing to Wes Newton 6–4. Suljović was beaten 5–4 by Mark Lawrence in the first round of the UK Open, and 6–4 by Adrian Lewis in the first round of the European Championship. Suljović qualified for the World Matchplay for the first time in his career, but lost 10–4 to Raymond van Barneveld in the first round. In November, he won through to the semi-finals of the 13th Players Championship where he lost 6–1 against Brendan Dolan.

=== 2014 ===
In the 2014 World Championship, Suljović missed four darts to take a 2–0 set lead against Mark Webster in the first round with the match going into a deciding set. With the set on throw with Webster three legs to two ahead, Suljović attempted to finish 57 but hit consecutive single twos to fail to set up a double, and watched Webster step in to take the match. He increased his ranking by 14 places over the year to be world number 45. The first PDC major quarter-final of his career came at the UK Open by seeing off Keegan Brown, Tony Randall, Robert Thornton and Jamie Lewis. Suljović played Adrian Lewis and, although both players averaged 98, Lewis was much more clinical on his doubles to win 10–3. Suljović partnered Rowby-John Rodriguez for the first time in the 2014 World Cup of Darts and they lost both of their singles matches in the second round against the Belgium brothers Kim and Ronny Huybrechts to exit the event. At his home event the Austrian Darts Open, Suljović produced four fine displays to reach the semi-finals where he was defeated 6–3 by Vincent van der Voort. At the European Championship he lost 6–2 to Jamie Caven in the first round.

=== 2015 ===
Despite having a higher average (98.91) and higher checkout percentage (60%) than his opponent Michael Smith in the first round of the 2015 World Championship, Suljović lost 3–1 with each set going to a deciding leg. His average was the highest of all 32 first round losers and the fifth highest of all 72 players. Suljović and Rodriguez were eliminated in the last 16 of the World Cup for the second year in a row, this time to Germany. Suljović came from 5–2 down against Terry Jenkins in the opening round of the World Matchplay to win 11–9 and then enjoyed a big win by taking out reigning world champion Gary Anderson 13–9. In his third major PDC quarter-final, Suljović was 12–5 down to James Wade, but responded to trail just 13–11. He missed one dart at double 14 in the next leg to reduce the gap to a single leg and instead went on to be defeated 16–11. He exacted revenge over Wade in the next major by beating him 2–1 in sets in the opening round of the World Grand Prix. Suljović was a set down but won six unanswered legs aided with checkouts of 148 and 129 to eliminate the two-time winner of the event. His form in the major events this year continued as he progressed to his third successive quarter-final with a 3–0 whitewash over Simon Whitlock. Vincent van der Voort missed 11 darts to take a 2–0 lead and Suljović responded by taking nine consecutive legs and wrapped up the match with a 170 finish in a win which he described as the best moment of his career. Suljović fought for a narrow 2–1 lead in his first major semi-final, but Robert Thornton won three sets in a row to end his tournament with a 4–2 defeat.

On the 2015 Pro Tour, Suljović had previously reached the last four at the first European Tour event of the year, the German Darts Championship and at the seventeenth Players Championship, losing to Michael van Gerwen and Ian White, respectively. At the final European Tour event, the European Darts Grand Prix, Suljović caused another upset with a 6–4 second round win against world number one Michael van Gerwen, with an average of 109.7. He then saw off Mervyn King 6–5 and Joe Cullen 6–4 to reach another semi-final, where he missed one dart at the bullseye in the deciding leg to complete a 132 finish against Wright in a 6–5 loss. Suljović concluded his year by beating Jamie Caven 6–3, Michael Smith 10–3 and White 10–6 at the Players Championship Finals to reach his second major semi-final of the year, where he was thrashed 11–1 by Adrian Lewis.

=== 2016 ===
Suljović and his second round World Championship opponent David Pallett both missed darts at doubles to complete nine-dart finishes in a close match in which there was never more than a set between the players. Suljović took the final set by three legs to one, but was thrashed 4–0 by Adrian Lewis in the third round. He lost in the semi-finals of the Dutch Darts Masters and a UK Open Qualifier, and at the UK Open itself was knocked out in the fifth round 9–5 by Mark Webster. Suljović and Rodriguez got to the quarter-finals of the World Cup, but only won one leg between them as they lost both of their singles matches to the top seeds of England.

He lost 11–5 to Phil Taylor in the second round of the World Matchplay, but had still done enough to enter the top 16 on the Order of Merit for the first time. In September, Suljović won his first ranking title by claiming the International Darts Open as he survived seven missed championship darts from Kim Huybrechts to win 6–5 in the final. He progressed through to the final of the next European Tour event, the European Darts Trophy and, though he led Michael van Gerwen 4–2, he lost 6–5. Another final followed at the 14th Players Championship, but he was whitewashed 6–0 by Van Gerwen.

In the second round of the European Championship, Suljović was 8–3 ahead of Ian White and hung on to squeeze through 10–9. He then produced the performance of his career to beat his idol Phil Taylor for the first time. Suljović averaged 105.50 as he eased past the 16-time world champion 10–3 and then saw off Peter Wright 11–8 to play in his first major final. Van Gerwen averaged 111.62, the highest ever in a televised final and over 25 points higher than Suljović, as he won 11–1. He qualified for his first Grand Slam of Darts and had a chance of getting out his group going in to the final round of fixtures, but was defeated 5–3 by Raymond van Barneveld. Suljović was now ranked the eighth best PDC player.

=== 2017 ===
His second round tie with Mark Webster at the 2017 World Championship went to a deciding set in which Webster won all three legs to eliminate Suljović 4–3. Suljović got through to the final of the Gibraltar Darts Trophy after Daryl Gurney missed four darts to beat him in the semi-finals. In the final Michael Smith was 3–0 up, before Suljović took four legs in a row. He was waiting on 56 at 4–4, but Smith completed a 132 finish and won the next leg to defeat Suljović 6–4. Austria played England in the quarter-finals of the 2017 World Cup for the second successive year. Suljović thrashed Adrian Lewis 4–0 and Rowby-John Rodriguez lost 4–1 to Dave Chisnall, before Austria were defeated 4–2 in the decisive doubles match.

Suljović won through to another European Tour Final at the 2017 European Darts Matchplay, including wins over in-form Gurney, Chisnall and Reyes, before falling to van Gerwen 6–3.

At the 13th and 14th Players Championships Suljović reached the quarter-finals and the last 16 stage, losing both times in tight games 6–5.

In the next European Tour Event, in his home town Vienna, Suljović beat Ronny Huybrechts in the second round, before losing to Mervyn King.

In the last European Tour Event before the summer break Suljović reached the semi-finals. Wins over Kist, Henderson and a walk-over (as his opponent Cullen withdrew in the third round) put him into the semis, where The Gentle lost to eventual champion Wright 6–3.

At the World Matchplay major event, seventh-seed Suljović comfortably defeated Henderson and Pipe to reach his ninth major quarter-final. Having been 12–10 up against Gurney, Suljović went on to lose 13–16 in a high-quality game, with both averaging just under 100.

Suljović did not participate in the Players Championships events ahead and following the World Matchplay.

In early September, Suljović lost to Beaton in the second round in the following European Tour Event. A loss to Cross in the third round ended Suljović's campaign in the 2017 German Darts Grand Prix, with Cross averaging nearly 110.

Suljović achieved his best run in a major TV event by winning the 2017 Champions League as a debutant. Three consecutive wins over Gary Anderson, Peter Wright and Dave Chisnall in the group phase made Suljović top the group, with the best three-dart average of all participants. In the semi-finals, the Austrian defeated Raymond van Barneveld 11–9, including a sensational 160 checkout to close out the game, with van Barneveld waiting on 32 after nine darts, after Suljović already missed tops for a 157 checkout to win at 10–8. In the final, Suljović faced Gary Anderson for the second time in the tournament. After crushing him in the round robin stage 10–3, the final proved to be a tougher affair. Another close scoreline of 11–9 in favour of Suljović led him to be crowned champion of a major TV event for the first time. His winning dart also happened to be on his beloved double 14.

Suljović reached the semi-finals of the World Grand Prix for the second time in his career, losing 4–3 in sets to Simon Whitlock. He reached the quarter-finals of both the European Championship and the Grand Slam in 2017.

At the "not liked World Championship" (as he says) in 2018, Suljović beat Kevin Painter 3–0 and Robert Thornton 4–2 to progress to the Last 16 stage, where he won only a few legs against Dimitri Van den Bergh.

=== 2019–present ===
Suljović suffered a 3–1 defeat to female darts player Fallon Sherrock in the 2020 PDC World Championship, making him only the second male to be defeated by a female in a main PDC World Championship tournament.

In 2021, Suljović and Rowby-John Rodriguez reached their first World Cup of Darts final, but the Austrian pair lost 3–1 to Scotland.

In 2022, Suljović faced Michael van Gerwen in the third round of the 2023 PDC World Darts Championship. With the score 3–1 in sets and 2–2 in legs, van Gerwen rejected a dart at the bullseye from 121 to set up double 16. Suljović then took out a 161 finish to make it 3–2. He lost the game with an average that was above 100 for most of the game, but he ended with 98.90. Van Gerwen averaged 107.66.

In 2023, Suljović reached the quarter-finals of the 2023 Austrian Darts Open, beating world champions Peter Wright and Michael Smith, before losing to Josh Rock 6–4. Suljović then entered the PDC Tour Card holders qualifiers in November in a bid to qualify for the 2024 PDC World Darts Championship, after falling out of the top 32 on both the PDC Order of Merit and Pro Tour Order of Merit. He lost to compatriot Rusty-Jake Rodriguez 6–4 in the Round of 32. Rodriguez would also successfully for the tournament, while Suljović failed to qualify for the World Championship for the first time since 2013.

In the 2024 World Cup of Darts, Suljović and his Austria teammate Rowby-John Rodriguez were the runners-up once again, reaching the final where they lost to England. The result qualified Suljović for the 2024 Grand Slam of Darts. However, Suljović was eliminated in the group stage, because he lost all his three matches to Michael Smith, Mike De Decker and Jermaine Wattimena.

At the 2025 Flanders Darts Trophy Suljović made the last 16 for the first time on the PDC European Tour since the 2023 Austrian Darts Open.

At the 2026 PDC World Darts Championship, Suljović lost 4–0 in the third round to defending and eventual back-to-back world champion, Luke Littler.

== World Championship results ==
=== BDO World Championship ===
- 2002: Second round (lost to Mervyn King 1–3)

=== PDC World Championship ===
- 2008: Second round (lost to John Part 1–4)
- 2009: Second round (lost to Mark Dudbridge 0–4)
- 2010: First round (lost to Kevin Painter 1–3)
- 2011: Third round (lost to Wes Newton 0–4)
- 2012: First round (lost to Paul Nicholson 1–3)
- 2014: First round (lost to Mark Webster 2–3)
- 2015: First round (lost to Michael Smith 1–3)
- 2016: Third round (lost to Adrian Lewis 0–4)
- 2017: Second round (lost to Mark Webster 3–4)
- 2018: Third round (lost to Dimitri Van den Bergh 0–4)
- 2019: Second round (lost to Ryan Searle 1–3)
- 2020: Second round (lost to Fallon Sherrock 1–3)
- 2021: Third round (lost to Gary Anderson 3–4)
- 2022: Second round (lost to Alan Soutar 2–3)
- 2023: Third round (lost to Michael van Gerwen 2–4)
- 2025: First round (lost to Matt Campbell 2–3)
- 2026: Third round (lost to Luke Littler 0–4)

== Career finals ==
=== PDC major finals: 3 (1 title) ===
Legend
World Matchplay (0–1)
Champions League (1–0)
European Championship (0–1)

| Outcome | No. | Year | Championship | Opponent in the final | Score (Note: (l) = score in legs, (s) = score in sets, (m) = score in matches.) |
|---|---|---|---|---|---|
| Runner-up | 1. | 2016 | European Championship | Michael van Gerwen | 1–11 (l) |
| Winner | 1. | 2017 | Champions League | Gary Anderson | 11–9 (l) |
| Runner-up | 2. | 2018 | World Matchplay | Gary Anderson | 19–21 (l) |

=== PDC world series finals: 1 (1 title) ===
Legend
World Series of Darts (1–0)

| Outcome | No. | Year | Championship | Opponent in the final | Score |
|---|---|---|---|---|---|
| Winner | 1. | 2018 | German Masters | Dimitri Van den Bergh | 8–2 (l) |

=== PDC team finals: 2 ===
| Outcome | No. | Year | Championship | Team | Teammate | Opponents in the final | Score (Note: (l) = score in legs, (s) = score in sets, (m) = score in matches.) |
|---|---|---|---|---|---|---|---|
| Runner-up | 1. | 2021 | World Cup of Darts | Austria | Rowby-John Rodriguez | Scotland – Peter Wright and John Henderson | 1–3 (m) |
| Runner-up | 2. | 2024 | World Cup of Darts (2) | Austria | Rowby-John Rodriguez | England – Luke Humphries and Michael Smith | 6–10 (l) |

== Performance timeline ==
=== BDO ===
| Tournament | 1999 | 2000 | 2001 | 2002 | 2003 |
|---|---|---|---|---|---|
| BDO World Championship | DNQ | | | 2R | DNQ |
| World Masters | 4R | Prel. | QF | DNQ | 2R |

=== PDC ===
| Tournament | 2008 | 2009 | 2010 | 2011 | 2012 | 2013 | 2014 | 2015 | 2016 | 2017 | 2018 | 2019 | 2020 | 2021 | 2022 | 2023 | 2024 | 2025 | 2026 |
|---|---|---|---|---|---|---|---|---|---|---|---|---|---|---|---|---|---|---|---|
PDC Ranked televised events
| World Championship | 2R | 2R | 1R | 3R | 1R | DNQ | 1R | 1R | 3R | 2R | 3R | 2R | 2R | 3R | 2R | 3R | DNQ | 1R | 3R |
| World Masters (Note: A non-ranked event until 2025) | Not held | | | | | Did not qualify | | | | QF | SF | QF | 1R | 2R | Did not qualify | | | Prel. | Prel. |
| UK Open | Did not qualify | | | | | 1R | QF | QF | 5R | DNP | | 5R | 6R | 5R | 6R | 4R | 5R | 5R | 5R |
| World Matchplay | Did not qualify | | | | | 1R | DNQ | QF | 2R | QF | F | 2R | 2R | WD | Did not qualify | | | | |
| World Grand Prix | Did not qualify | | | | | | | SF | 1R | SF | SF | 1R | 1R | 1R | Did not qualify | | | | |
| European Championship | 2R | 2R | DNQ | 1R | 1R | 1R | 1R | 1R | F | QF | 1R | 1R | 2R | QF | Did not qualify | | | | |
| Grand Slam | Did not qualify | | | | | | | | RR | QF | SF | DNQ | | 2R | RR | DNQ | RR | DNQ | |
| Players Championship Finals | NH | Did not qualify | | | | | | SF | 1R | 2R | WD | 3R | WD | 1R | 1R | DNQ | 1R | DNQ | |
PDC Non-ranked televised events
| Premier League | Did not participate | | | | | | | | | | 9th | 6th | Did not participate | | | | | | |
| Champions League | Not held | | | | | | | | DNQ | W | SF | DNQ | Not held | | | | | | |
| World Cup | NH | | QF | NH | 2R | 1R | 2R | 2R | QF | QF | 1R | QF | QF | F | 2R | RR | F | RR | RR |
| World Series Finals | Not held | | | | | | | DNQ | 2R | 1R | 2R | SF | 1R | DNP | | DNQ | DNP | | |
Career statistics
| Year-end ranking | 58 | 47 | 50 | 50 | 46 | 44 | 40 | 21 | 8 | 5 | 7 | 11 | 20 | 26 | 30 | 55 | 56 | 55 | |

==== European Tour ====
| Season | 1 | 2 | 3 | 4 | 5 | 6 | 7 | 8 | 9 | 10 | 11 | 12 | 13 | 14 | 15 |
|---|---|---|---|---|---|---|---|---|---|---|---|---|---|---|---|
| 2012 | ADO; 1R | GDC; 2R | EDO; DNQ | GDM; 1R | DDM; DNQ | | | | | | | | | | |
| 2013 | UKM; 3R | EDT; SF | EDO; 1R | ADO; 1R | GDT; 2R | GDC; DNQ | GDM; 1R | DDM; DNQ | | | | | | | |
| 2014 | GDC; DNQ | DDM; 1R | GDM; DNQ | ADO; SF | GDT; DNQ | EDO; 1R | EDG; 1R | EDT; 1R | | | | | | | |
| 2015 | GDC; SF | GDT; DNQ | GDM; 3R | DDM; 2R | IDO; 2R | EDO; 2R | EDT; 2R | EDM; 1R | EDG; SF | | | | | | |
| 2016 | DDM; SF | GDM; 2R | GDT; QF | EDM; QF | ADO; 2R | EDO; QF | IDO; W | EDT; F | EDG; 3R | GDC; SF | | | | | |
| 2017 | GDC; QF | GDM; 3R | GDO; QF | EDG; 3R | GDT; F | EDM; F | ADO; 3R | EDO; SF | DDM; 2R | GDG; 3R | IDO; 3R | EDT; WD | | | |
| 2018 | EDO; 3R | GDG; 3R | GDO; 3R | ADO; SF | EDG; 3R | DDM; QF | GDT; 2R | DDO; W | EDM; QF | GDC; SF | DDC; WD | IDO; 3R | EDT; WD | | |
| 2019 | EDO; SF | GDC; 2R | GDG; QF | GDO; QF | ADO; 3R | EDG; 2R | DDM; 2R | DDO; 3R | CDO; QF | ADC; W | EDM; 3R | IDO; 3R | GDT; 3R | | |
| 2020 | BDC; QF | GDC; 3R | EDG; SF | IDO; SF | | | | | | | | | | | |
| 2021 | HDT; 2R | GDT; F | | | | | | | | | | | | | |
| 2022 | IDO; 2R | GDC; 3R | GDG; DNQ | ADO; 1R | Did not qualify | | | | | | | | GDT; 3R | | |
| 2023 | Did not qualify | | | | ADO; QF | Did not qualify | | | | | | | | | |
| 2024 | Did not qualify | | | | | | | | GDC; 2R | Did not qualify | | | | | |
| 2025 | Did not qualify | | | GDG; 1R | ADO; 2R | Did not qualify | | | BSD; 1R | FDT; 3R | DNQ | | SDT; 2R | GDC; DNQ | |
| 2026 | PDO; DNQ | EDT; 3R | Did not qualify | | | ADO; 2R | Did not qualify | | | | | | | SDT; SF | DDC |

==== Players Championships ====
| Season | 1 | 2 | 3 | 4 | 5 | 6 | 7 | 8 | 9 | 10 | 11 | 12 | 13 | 14 | 15 | 16 | 17 | 18 | 19 | 20 | 21 | 22 | 23 | 24 | 25 | 26 | 27 | 28 | 29 | 30 | 31 | 32 | 33 | 34 |
|---|---|---|---|---|---|---|---|---|---|---|---|---|---|---|---|---|---|---|---|---|---|---|---|---|---|---|---|---|---|---|---|---|---|---|
| 2012 | ALI; DNP | ALI; 4R | Did not participate | | | | | | | | | | | | | | | | | | | | | | | | | | | | | | | |
| 2013 | DNP | | | | CRA; 4R | CRA; 2R | Did not participate | | | | | | WIG; SF | WIG; 1R | BAR; DNP | | | | | | | | | | | | | | | | | | | |
| 2014 | Did not participate | | | | | | | | | | | | | | DUB; 1R | DUB; 1R | CRA; 2R | CRA; 1R | COV; DNP | | | | | | | | | | | | | | | |
| 2015 | BAR; 1R | BAR; 3R | BAR; QF | BAR; 2R | BAR; 3R | COV; 3R | COV; 4R | COV; QF | CRA; 3R | CRA; 3R | BAR; 2R | BAR; 4R | WIG; QF | WIG; QF | BAR; 1R | BAR; 3R | DUB; SF | DUB; 3R | COV; SF | COV; 1R | | | | | | | | | | | | | | |
| 2016 | BAR; 3R | BAR; QF | BAR; 2R | BAR; 4R | BAR; 2R | BAR; QF | BAR; 4R | COV; QF | COV; 4R | BAR; 4R | BAR; QF | BAR; 4R | BAR; QF | BAR; F | BAR; 1R | BAR; 2R | DUB; SF | DUB; 4R | BAR; 4R | BAR; 4R | | | | | | | | | | | | | | |
| 2017 | BAR; 4R | BAR; 1R | BAR; 4R | BAR; 4R | MIL; 1R | MIL; SF | BAR; QF | BAR; 2R | WIG; 2R | WIG; 3R | MIL; QF | MIL; 4R | WIG; QF | WIG; 4R | BAR; DNP | | | | DUB; SF | DUB; W | BAR; DNP | | | | | | | | | | | | | |
| 2018 | BAR; DNP | | BAR; 3R | BAR; DNP | MIL; QF | MIL; 2R | BAR; DNP | | WIG; 3R | WIG; 1R | MIL; 2R | MIL; 3R | WIG; 3R | WIG; 2R | BAR; DNP | | | | DUB; 2R | DUB; QF | BAR; QF | BAR; QF | | | | | | | | | | | | |
| 2019 | WIG; DNP | | WIG; 3R | WIG; 4R | BAR; 4R | BAR; 1R | WIG; DNP | | BAR; 1R | BAR; 1R | BAR; DNP | | | BAR; 3R | BAR; DNP | | WIG; 3R | WIG; 3R | BAR; 4R | BAR; 3R | HIL; QF | HIL; SF | BAR; DNP | | BAR; QF | BAR; W | DUB; SF | DUB; SF | BAR; DNP | BAR; DNP | | | | |
| 2020 | BAR; 1R | BAR; 2R | WIG; 3R | WIG; QF | WIG; 3R | WIG; 2R | BAR; DNP | | MIL; QF | MIL; 2R | MIL; 1R | MIL; SF | MIL; 3R | NIE; 3R | NIE; 3R | NIE; F | NIE; QF | NIE; 1R | COV; DNP | | | | | | | | | | | | | | | |
| 2021 | BOL; 2R | BOL; QF | BOL; 3R | BOL; 1R | MIL; 4R | MIL; 2R | MIL; 2R | MIL; 3R | NIE; 3R | NIE; 1R | NIE; 4R | NIE; 2R | Did not participate | | | | | | | | | | | BAR; 1R | BAR; 3R | BAR; 1R | BAR; 3R | BAR; 2R | BAR; 1R | BAR; 4R | | | | |
| 2022 | BAR; 1R | BAR; 4R | WIG; 2R | WIG; 3R | BAR; 1R | BAR; 4R | NIE; 3R | NIE; 2R | BAR; DNP | | | BAR; 3R | BAR; 3R | WIG; 1R | WIG; 2R | NIE; 1R | NIE; 1R | BAR; 2R | BAR; 3R | BAR; 1R | BAR; QF | BAR; 3R | BAR; 1R | BAR; QF | BAR; 1R | BAR; 2R | BAR; 2R | BAR; 3R | BAR; 1R | BAR; 1R | | | | |
| 2023 | BAR; 1R | BAR; 1R | BAR; 1R | BAR; 1R | BAR; 2R | BAR; 1R | HIL; 1R | HIL; 1R | WIG; 3R | WIG; 1R | LEI; 3R | LEI; 1R | HIL; 1R | HIL; SF | LEI; DNP | | HIL; 1R | HIL; 1R | BAR; 3R | BAR; 1R | BAR; 1R | BAR; 2R | BAR; 3R | BAR; 2R | BAR; 2R | BAR; 3R | BAR; 1R | BAR; 1R | BAR; 1R | BAR; 1R | | | | |
| 2024 | WIG; 3R | WIG; 2R | LEI; 2R | LEI; 1R | HIL; 1R | HIL; 1R | LEI; 3R | LEI; 3R | HIL; 2R | HIL; 2R | HIL; 3R | HIL; 3R | MIL; 2R | MIL; 1R | MIL; 1R | MIL; 1R | MIL; 1R | MIL; 2R | MIL; QF | WIG; 1R | WIG; 3R | MIL; 2R | MIL; 2R | WIG; 3R | WIG; 1R | WIG; 2R | WIG; 3R | WIG; 4R | LEI; QF | LEI; 1R | | | | |
| 2025 | WIG; 3R | WIG; 1R | ROS; 1R | ROS; 2R | LEI; 1R | LEI; 1R | HIL; 2R | HIL; 4R | LEI; 1R | LEI; 2R | LEI; 1R | LEI; 2R | ROS; 2R | ROS; 2R | HIL; 1R | HIL; 2R | LEI; 3R | LEI; 2R | LEI; 2R | LEI; DNP | | HIL; 2R | HIL; 1R | MIL; 2R | MIL; 1R | HIL; 1R | HIL; 3R | LEI; 1R | LEI; 3R | LEI; 1R | WIG; 3R | WIG; 1R | WIG; 1R | WIG; 1R |
| 2026 | HIL; 4R | HIL; 2R | WIG; 1R | WIG; 1R | LEI; 2R | LEI; 2R | LEI; 1R | LEI; 1R | WIG; 4R | WIG; 1R | MIL; 3R | MIL; 1R | HIL; SF | HIL; QF | LEI; 1R | LEI; 3R | LEI; 3R | LEI; 2R | MIL; 2R | MIL; 2R | DNP | | | LEI; 2R | HIL; 1R | HIL; 4R | LEI; DNP | | ROS; 2R | ROS; 1R | ROS; 1R | ROS; 2R | LEI; 2R | LEI; 2R |

Performance Table Legend
| W | Won the tournament | F | Finalist | SF | Semifinalist | QF | Quarterfinalist | #R; RR; Prel. | Lost in # round Round-robin; Preliminary round | DQ | Disqualified |
| DNQ | Did not qualify | DNP | Did not participate | WD | Withdrew | NH | Tournament not held | #R; RR; Prel. | Lost in # round Round-robin; Preliminary round | NYF | Not yet founded |
