= Steve Lennon =

Irish darts player (born 1993)

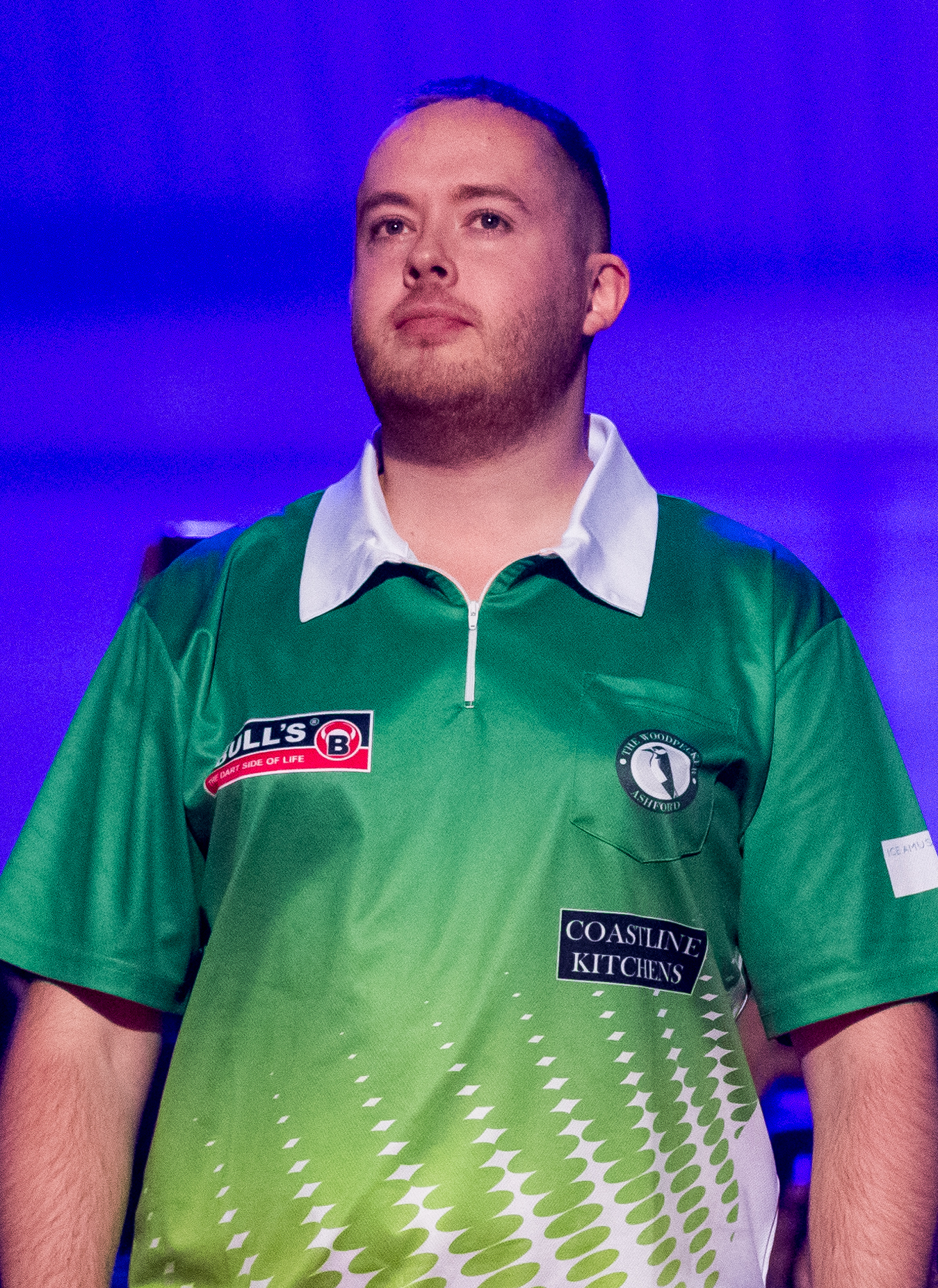
- Lennon in 2019

Personal information
- Nickname: "Scuba Steve"
- Born: 25 November 1993 (age 32) Carlow, Ireland

Sport
- Sport: Darts
- Playing since: 2011
- Darts: 24g Bull's Germany Signature
- Laterality: Right-handed
- Walk-on music: "Mr. Blue Sky" by Electric Light Orchestra

Organisation (see split in darts)
- BDO: 2014–2017
- PDC: 2017–present (Tour Card: 2017–2025)
- Current world ranking: (PDC) 124 ▲1 (29 October 2026)

WDF major events – best performances
- World Masters: Last 80: 2016

PDC premier events – best performances
- World Championship: Last 32: 2022
- World Matchplay: Last 32: 2018
- World Grand Prix: Last 32: 2018
- UK Open: Last 16: 2019
- Grand Slam: Last 16: 2017
- European Championship: Last 32: 2018, 2020
- Premier League: Challenger: 2019
- PC Finals: Quarter-final: 2018

Other tournament wins
- Years
Ireland Players Championship	2014
PDC Development Tour	2016

Steve Lennon (born 25 November 1993) is an Irish professional darts player who competes in Professional Darts Corporation (PDC) events. A professional since 2017, he has participated in seven PDC World Championships and reached his first major quarter-final at the 2018 Players Championship Finals. He finished as the runner-up at the 2018 Dutch Darts Masters on the PDC European Tour.

Nicknamed "Scuba Steve", Lennon has represented Ireland at the PDC World Cup of Darts on five occasions alongside William O'Connor. The pair reached the final at the 2019 edition.

== Career ==
Lennon played county darts for Kilkenny and Kildare. Lennon has played professional darts since 2011. He first won a tournament in the Ireland Players Championship, beating Stephen Byrne 6–1 in the Final. In 2016, he made it to the final of the Finnish Masters, beating Dennis Nilsson.

Lennon entered the Professional Darts Corporation's Qualifying School in 2017, and picked up a Tour Card on the third day.

He made his World Championship debut in 2018 but lost 2–3 to Michael Smith in the first round.

Lennon made it to the final of the 2018 Dutch Darts Masters, where he lost out to Michael van Gerwen. He reached the quarter-final of the 2018 Players Championship Finals, again losing to van Gerwen.

Following Gary Anderson's withdrawal from the 2019 Premier League, Lennon was selected as one of nine 'contenders' to replace him. He played Peter Wright on Night 3, in Dublin. Lennon took a 3–0 lead, only to lose 7–5.

In June 2019, Lennon alongside William O'Connor made it all the way to the final of the 2019 PDC World Cup of Darts where they eventually lost to Scotland 3–1.

He enjoyed one of his finest days in the PDC on 22 February 2020 when he got to the semi-finals of Players Championship 5, only to lose narrowly to Gerwyn Price. Lennon had three averages of over 100. He hit his first PDC nine-dart finish in his last 32 game against Kai Fan Leung.

Unable to qualify for any ranking major apart from UK Open in 2022, Lennon dropped down in ranking. He missed his first World Championship in six years, but managed to stay within top 64 of PDC Order of Merit and continued on the Pro Tour in 2023.

In 2023 Lennon continued to struggle, missing out on PDC World Cup of Darts for the first time since 2017. He qualified for 2023 Grand Slam of Darts, but did not qualify from the round robin. He was also able to qualify for 2023 Players Championship Finals and was eliminated in Second Round. After one-year absence he returned to Alexandra Palace for 2024 PDC World Darts Championship. Lennon came back from 0–2 on sets against Owen Bates in the First Round and won 3–2, giving him chance to keep his Tour card. However, he lost in Second round against Jonny Clayton 1–3 and finished the season on 66th place in PDC Order of Merit.

Lennon lost his Tour card after 2023 season, but managed to win his Tour card back on first day of UK Q-School 2024, defeating William Borland 6–4 and securing his position for seasons 2024 and 2025. In the 2024 PDC Players Championship series, Lennon made the quarter-finals of event 3, defeating Adam Warner 6–5, Gerwyn Price 6–3, Dimitri Van den Bergh 6–3 and Ritchie Edhouse 6–4 before losing to Michael van Gerwen 6–5.

== Personal life ==
Lennon previously studied business at Waterford Institute of Technology.

== World Championship results ==
=== PDC ===
- 2018: First round (lost to Michael Smith 2–3)
- 2019: Second round (lost to Alan Norris 2–3)
- 2020: First round (lost to Callan Rydz 2–3)
- 2021: Second round (lost to Devon Petersen 1–3)
- 2022: Third round (lost to Mervyn King 0–4)
- 2024: Second round (lost to Jonny Clayton 1–3)
- 2026: First round (lost to Damon Heta 1–3)

== Career finals ==
=== PDC team finals: 1 (1 runner-up) ===
Outcome	No.	Year	Championship	Country	Teammate	Opponents in the final	Score (Note: (l) = score in legs, (s) = score in sets, (m) = score in matches.)
Runner-up	1.	2019	World Cup of Darts	Ireland	William O'Connor	Scotland – Peter Wright and Gary Anderson	1–3 (m)

== Performance timeline ==
=== BDO ===
Tournament	2014	2015	2016
BDO Ranked televised events
World Masters	2R	1R	3R

=== PDC ===
Tournament	2014	2015	2016	2017	2018	2019	2020	2021	2022	2023	2024	2025	2026
PDC Ranked televised events
World Championship	Did not qualify				1R	2R	1R	2R	3R	DNQ	2R	DNQ	1R
World Masters	Did not qualify											Prel.	DNQ
UK Open	Did not participate			2R	DNQ	6R	3R	4R	4R	3R	2R	2R	DNQ
World Matchplay	Did not qualify				1R	Did not qualify							
World Grand Prix	Did not qualify				1R	Did not qualify							
European Championship	Did not participate			DNQ	1R	DNQ	1R	Did not qualify					
Grand Slam	Did not qualify			2R	DNQ	RR	Did not qualify			RR	DNQ		
Players Championship Finals	Did not participate			2R	QF	1R	1R	1R	DNQ	2R	DNQ		
PDC Non-ranked televised events
Premier League	Did not participate					C	Did not participate						
World Cup	Did not participate				1R	F	1R	1R	2R	DNP			
World Youth Championship	1R	1R	QF	1R	Did not participate								
Career statistics
Year-end ranking	-	-	-	71	41	41	45	44	61	66	100	76	

==== European Tour ====
Season	1	2	3	4	5	6	7	8	9	10	11	12	13	14
2017	DNQ		GDO; 1R	EDG; 1R	Did not qualify				DDM; 1R	GDG; DNQ	IDO; 2R	EDT; DNQ		
2018	EDO; DNQ	GDG; 2R	GDO; 2R	ADO; 2R	EDG; 1R	DDM; F	GDT; 1R	Did not qualify				IDO; 2R	EDT; DNQ	
2019	Did not qualify			GDO; 2R	ADO; 2R	DNQ		DDO; 1R	DNQ		EDM; 1R	DNQ		
2020	BDC; 2R	GDC; 2R	EDG; 2R	IDO; DNQ										
2022	Did not qualify							DDC; 1R	EDM; 1R	Did not qualify				
2023	BSD; DNQ	EDO; 1R	IDO; 2R	Did not qualify							GDO; 1R	HDT; DNQ	GDC; 2R	
2024	BDO; DNQ	GDG; 2R	Did not qualify											
2025	Did not qualify									FDT; 1R	DNQ			GDC; 3R

==== Players Championships ====
Season	1	2	3	4	5	6	7	8	9	10	11	12	13	14	15	16	17	18	19	20	21	22	23	24	25	26	27	28	29	30	31	32	33	34
2011	Did not participate																						KIL; 1R	Did not participate										
2012 (Note: Not a Tour card holder)	Did not participate														KIL; Prel.	KIL; Prel.	Did not participate																	
2013	Did not participate										KIL; 1R	KIL; Prel.	Did not participate																					
2017	BAR; 1R	BAR; 1R	BAR; 2R	BAR; 2R	MIL; 3R	MIL; 1R	BAR; QF	BAR; 2R	WIG; 1R	WIG; 2R	MIL; 4R	MIL; 4R	WIG; 1R	WIG; 2R	BAR; 4R	BAR; 2R	BAR; 4R	BAR; 1R	DUB; QF	DUB; 2R	BAR; 1R	BAR; 2R												
2018	BAR; 1R	BAR; 1R	BAR; 2R	BAR; 1R	MIL; 3R	MIL; 1R	BAR; 2R	BAR; 2R	WIG; 1R	WIG; 2R	MIL; 3R	MIL; 3R	WIG; 3R	WIG; 2R	BAR; 3R	BAR; 3R	BAR; 2R	BAR; QF	DUB; 4R	DUB; 3R	BAR; 3R	BAR; 1R												
2019	WIG; 3R	WIG; 4R	WIG; 2R	WIG; 1R	BAR; 2R	BAR; 2R	WIG; 1R	WIG; 2R	BAR; 3R	BAR; 3R	BAR; 3R	BAR; 1R	BAR; 2R	BAR; 1R	BAR; 1R	BAR; 2R	WIG; 1R	WIG; 1R	BAR; 1R	BAR; 3R	HIL; 1R	HIL; 1R	BAR; 1R	BAR; 3R	BAR; 2R	BAR; 1R	DUB; 2R	DUB; 2R	BAR; 3R	BAR; 1R				
2020	BAR; 1R	BAR; 1R	WIG; 1R	WIG; 2R	WIG; SF	WIG; 3R	BAR; 1R	BAR; 1R	MIL; 1R	MIL; 2R	MIL; 2R	MIL; 2R	MIL; 2R	NIE; 1R	NIE; 3R	NIE; 1R	NIE; 1R	NIE; 1R	COV; 2R	COV; 3R	COV; 1R	COV; 3R	COV; 2R											
2021	BOL; 3R	BOL; 1R	BOL; 2R	BOL; 1R	MIL; 2R	MIL; 1R	MIL; 4R	MIL; QF	NIE; 4R	NIE; QF	NIE; 2R	NIE; 2R	MIL; 1R	MIL; 1R	MIL; 1R	MIL; 2R	COV; 1R	COV; 3R	COV; 1R	COV; 1R	BAR; 2R	BAR; 3R	BAR; 2R	BAR; 1R	BAR; 1R	BAR; 1R	BAR; 1R	BAR; 1R	BAR; 2R	BAR; 1R				
2022	BAR; 1R	BAR; 1R	WIG; 2R	WIG; 1R	BAR; 2R	BAR; 1R	NIE; 2R	NIE; 1R	BAR; 1R	BAR; 3R	BAR; 3R	BAR; 2R	BAR; 2R	WIG; 1R	WIG; 2R	NIE; 2R	NIE; 1R	BAR; 1R	BAR; 3R	BAR; 1R	BAR; 3R	BAR; 2R	BAR; 2R	BAR; 1R	BAR; 1R	BAR; 3R	BAR; 2R	BAR; 1R	BAR; 4R	BAR; 3R				
2023	BAR; 2R	BAR; 4R	BAR; 3R	BAR; 1R	BAR; 2R	BAR; 1R	HIL; 1R	HIL; 3R	WIG; 3R	WIG; 1R	LEI; 2R	LEI; 4R	HIL; 1R	HIL; 1R	LEI; 2R	LEI; 2R	HIL; 1R	HIL; 2R	BAR; 1R	BAR; 3R	BAR; 3R	BAR; 4R	BAR; 2R	BAR; 2R	BAR; 3R	BAR; 1R	BAR; 1R	BAR; 2R	BAR; 1R	BAR; 3R				
2024	WIG; 1R	WIG; 3R	LEI; QF	LEI; 3R	HIL; 1R	HIL; 2R	LEI; 1R	LEI; 1R	HIL; 1R	HIL; 1R	HIL; 1R	HIL; 1R	MIL; 2R	MIL; 1R	MIL; 2R	MIL; 1R	MIL; 1R	MIL; 1R	MIL; 2R	WIG; 2R	WIG; 1R	MIL; 3R	MIL; 2R	WIG; 1R	WIG; 1R	WIG; 1R	WIG; 1R	WIG; 2R	LEI; 2R	LEI; 4R				
2025	WIG; 1R	WIG; 1R	ROS; 3R	ROS; 1R	LEI; 2R	LEI; 1R	HIL; 3R	HIL; 1R	LEI; 1R	LEI; 3R	LEI; 3R	LEI; 2R	ROS; 1R	ROS; 2R	HIL; 1R	HIL; 2R	LEI; 2R	LEI; 1R	LEI; 1R	LEI; 2R	LEI; 2R	HIL; 3R	HIL; 2R	MIL; 4R	MIL; 2R	HIL; 1R	HIL; 2R	LEI; 2R	LEI; 2R	LEI; 2R	WIG; 2R	WIG; 1R	WIG; 2R	WIG; 1R
2026	HIL; 4R	HIL; 1R	WIG; 1R	WIG; 1R	LEI; 1R	LEI; 2R	LEI; 1R	LEI; 1R	WIG; 1R	WIG; 1R	MIL; 1R	MIL; 3R	HIL; 1R	HIL; 1R	LEI; 1R	LEI; 1R	LEI; 1R	LEI; 3R	MIL; 1R	MIL; 1R	WIG; 2R	WIG; 2R	LEI; 2R	LEI; 1R	HIL; 1R	HIL; 1R	LEI; 2R	LEI; 1R	ROS; 1R	ROS; QF	ROS; 1R	ROS; 2R	LEI; 4R	LEI; 1R

Performance Table Legend
W	Won the tournament	F	Finalist	SF	Semifinalist	QF	Quarterfinalist	#R; RR; Prel.	Lost in # round Round-robin; Preliminary round	DQ	Disqualified
DNQ	Did not qualify	DNP	Did not participate	WD	Withdrew	NH	Tournament not held	#R; RR; Prel.	Lost in # round Round-robin; Preliminary round	NYF	Not yet founded
