= 2018 Dutch Darts Masters =

Tournament information
- Dates: 11–13 May 2018
- Venue: IJsselhallen
- Location: Zwolle
- Country: Netherlands
- Organisation(s): PDC
- Format: Legs
- Prize fund: £135,000
- Winner's share: £25,000
- High checkout: 170 (Australia) Kyle Anderson (second round)

Champion(s)
- (Netherlands) Michael van Gerwen

The 2018 Dutch Darts Masters was the sixth of thirteen PDC European Tour events on the 2018 PDC Pro Tour. The tournament took place at IJsselhallen, Zwolle, Netherlands, between 11–13 May 2018. It featured a field of 48 players and £135,000 in prize money, with £25,000 going to the winner.

Michael van Gerwen was the defending four-time consecutive champion after defeating Steve Beaton 6–2 in the 2017 final.

Van Gerwen went on to win the title for the 5th time in a row by defeating Steve Lennon 8–5 in the final, after he was 6–2 down in the semi-finals, before surviving three match darts from Daryl Gurney and winning 7–6 to reach the final.

== Prize money ==
This is how the prize money is divided:

Stage (num. of players)		Prize money
Winner	(1)	£25,000
Runner-up	(1)	£10,000
Semi-finalists	(2)	£6,000
Quarter-finalists	(4)	£4,000
Third round losers	(8)	£3,000
Second round losers	(16)	£2,000
First round losers	(16)	£1,000
Total	£135,000	

Prize money will count towards the PDC Order of Merit, the ProTour Order of Merit and the European Tour Order of Merit, with one exception: should a seeded player lose in the second round (last 32), their prize money will not count towards any Orders of Merit, although they still receive the full prize money payment.

== Qualification and format ==
The top 16 entrants from the PDC ProTour Order of Merit on 27 March will automatically qualify for the event and will be seeded in the second round.

The remaining 32 places will go to players from five qualifying events – 18 from the UK Qualifier (held in Barnsley on 6 April), eight from the West/South European Qualifier (held on 3 May), four from the Host Nation Qualifier (held on 10 May), one from the Nordic & Baltic Qualifier (held on 23 February) and one from the East European Qualifier (held on 24 February).

Rob Cross withdrew with illness on the day of the tournament, so Steve Lennon, who was due to face him in round 2, was given a bye to round 3.

The following players will take part in the tournament:

Top 16
1. (Netherlands) Michael van Gerwen (champion)
2. (Scotland) Peter Wright (quarter-finals)
3. (England) ~~Rob Cross (withdrew)~~
4. (England) Michael Smith (second round)
5. (Northern Ireland) Daryl Gurney (semi-finals)
6. (Austria) Mensur Suljović (quarter-finals)
7. (England) Joe Cullen (second round)
8. (England) Dave Chisnall (second round)
9. (England) Ian White (second round)
10. (Belgium) Kim Huybrechts (semi-finals)
11. (Australia) Simon Whitlock (third round)
12. (England) Mervyn King (third round)
13. (Netherlands) Jelle Klaasen (second round)
14. (Scotland) John Henderson (second round)
15. (Wales) Gerwyn Price (third round)
16. (England) Darren Webster (third round)

UK Qualifier
- (Australia) Kyle Anderson (quarter-finals)
- (England) Stephen Bunting (quarter-finals)
- (England) Steve Beaton (second round)
- (Wales) Jonny Clayton (first round)
- (England) Adrian Lewis (first round)
- (England) Adam Huckvale (first round)
- (England) James Wade (first round)
- (England) James Wilson (second round)
- (England) Ricky Evans (first round)
- (England) Josh Payne (second round)
- (Republic of Ireland) Jason Cullen (first round)
- (Scotland) Cameron Menzies (third round)
- (England) Wayne Jones (second round)
- (England) Terry Jenkins (second round)
- (England) James Richardson (third round)
- (Wales) Jamie Lewis (first round)
- (Republic of Ireland) Steve Lennon (runner-up)
- (England) Ryan Joyce (second round)

West/South European Qualifier
- (Germany) Michael Rosenauer (first round)
- (Spain) Toni Alcinas (first round)
- (Germany) Dragutin Horvat (second round)
- (Spain) Cristo Reyes (second round)
- (Belgium) Mike De Decker (first round)
- (Germany) Tobias Müller (first round)
- (Austria) Rowby-John Rodriguez (first round)
- (Germany) Kevin Münch (first round)

Host Nation Qualifier
- (Netherlands) Jermaine Wattimena (third round)
- (Netherlands) Jan Dekker (second round)
- (Netherlands) Christian Kist (first round)
- (Netherlands) Jeffrey de Graaf (first round)

Nordic & Baltic Qualifier
- (Sweden) Johan Engström (first round)

East European Qualifier
- (Poland) Krzysztof Ratajski (third round)

== Draw ==
First round (best of 11 legs); 11 May
(England) Terry Jenkins 94.20	6
(Belgium) Mike De Decker 79.31	2
(England) Steve Beaton 82.08	6
(Netherlands) Jeffrey de Graaf 86.69	5
(Scotland) Cameron Menzies 96.31	6
(Germany) Kevin Münch 82.37	1
(Australia) Kyle Anderson 98.80	6
(Netherlands) Christian Kist 91.09	3
(England) James Wade 94.70	3
(Spain) Cristo Reyes 98.57	6
(England) Ryan Joyce 89.92	6
(Germany) Michael Rosenauer 83.46	5
(England) Stephen Bunting 91.07	6
(Germany) Tobias Müller 83.61	1
(England) Ricky Evans 90.19	2
(Poland) Krzysztof Ratajski 89.74	6
(England) James Wilson 100.72	6
(Sweden) Johan Engström 86.11	2
(Spain) Toni Alcinas 88.46	5
(Germany) Dragutin Horvat 91.74	6
(Netherlands) Jermaine Wattimena 90.55	6
(England) Adam Huckvale 80.06	3
(Wales) Jamie Lewis 90.03	1
(England) Wayne Jones 101.32	6
(Wales) Jonny Clayton 89.88	5
(England) Josh Payne 89.57	6
(England) Adrian Lewis 82.32	4
(Netherlands) Jan Dekker 92.88	6
(Republic of Ireland) Steve Lennon 91.53	6
(Austria) Rowby-John Rodriguez 95.84	5
(England) James Richardson 96.66	6
(Republic of Ireland) Jason Cullen 87.82	4

Second round (best of 11 legs); 12 May
1	(Netherlands) Michael van Gerwen 95.94	6
(England) Terry Jenkins 81.66	0
16	(England) Darren Webster 94.55	6
(England) Steve Beaton 96.69	4
8	(England) Dave Chisnall 84.91	4
(Scotland) Cameron Menzies 95.38	6
9	(England) Ian White 102.87	3
(Australia) Kyle Anderson 99.09	6
5	(Northern Ireland) Daryl Gurney 102.06	6
(Spain) Cristo Reyes 93.36	4
12	(England) Mervyn King 93.77	6
(England) Ryan Joyce 86.92	4
4	(England) Michael Smith 93.04	0
(England) Stephen Bunting 106.09	6
13	(Netherlands) Jelle Klaasen 88.59	2
(Poland) Krzysztof Ratajski 92.83	6
2	(Scotland) Peter Wright 96.86	6
(England) James Wilson 95.23	4
15	(Wales) Gerwyn Price 88.80	6
(Germany) Dragutin Horvat 86.22	5
7	(England) Joe Cullen 99.92	3
(Netherlands) Jermaine Wattimena 96.87	6
10	(Belgium) Kim Huybrechts 89.39	6
(England) Wayne Jones 88.57	2
6	(Austria) Mensur Suljović 94.74	6
(England) Josh Payne 92.48	5
11	(Australia) Simon Whitlock 97.63	6
(Netherlands) Jan Dekker 89.11	4
3	(England) Rob Cross	w/d
(Republic of Ireland) Steve Lennon	w/o
14	(Scotland) John Henderson 89.74	3
(England) James Richardson 92.01	6

Third round (best of 11 legs); 13 May
1	(Netherlands) van Gerwen 91.97	6
16	(England) Webster 89.26	4
(Scotland) Menzies 74.79	5
(Australia) Anderson 89.39	6
5	(Northern Ireland) Gurney 98.53	6
12	(England) King 90.16	2
(England) Bunting 100.17	6
(Poland) Ratajski 99.70	3
2	(Scotland) Wright 103.40	6
15	(Wales) Price 97.22	3
(Netherlands) Wattimena 91.05	5
10	(Belgium) Huybrechts 90.16	6
6	(Austria) Suljović 94.11	6
11	(Australia) Whitlock 91.78	3
(Republic of Ireland) Lennon 86.87	6
(England) Richardson 83.00	5

Quarter-finals (best of 11 legs); 13 May
1	(Netherlands) van Gerwen 102.78	6
(Australia) Anderson 91.42	2
5	(Northern Ireland) Gurney 93.58	6
(England) Bunting 97.92	2
2	(Scotland) Wright 95.98	5
10	(Belgium) Huybrechts 93.49	6
6	(Austria) Suljović 92.96	3
(Republic of Ireland) Lennon 87.59	6

Semi-finals (best of 13 legs); 13 May
1	(Netherlands) van Gerwen 93.34	7
5	(Northern Ireland) Gurney 84.60	6
10	(Belgium) Huybrechts 85.02	5
(Republic of Ireland) Lennon 88.74	7

Final (best of 15 legs); 13 May
1	(Netherlands) van Gerwen 97.53	8
(Republic of Ireland) Lennon 91.40	5
