= 2017 World Matchplay =

2017 BetVictor World Matchplay

Tournament information
- Dates: 22–30 July 2017
- Venue: Winter Gardens
- Location: Blackpool, England
- Organisation(s): Professional Darts Corporation (PDC)
- Format: Legs
- Prize fund: £500,000
- Winner's share: £115,000
- High checkout: 170; Benito van de Pas; Gerwyn Price

Champion(s)
- Phil Taylor (ENG)

The 2017 BetVictor World Matchplay was a professional darts tournament that took place at the Winter Gardens, Blackpool, from 22–30 July 2017. It was the twenty-fourth annual staging of the World Matchplay to be organised by the Professional Darts Corporation.

Michael van Gerwen was the defending champion but lost to Phil Taylor 16–6 in the quarter-finals, Taylor beat Peter Wright 18–8 in the final to claim his 16th World Matchplay title. It was Taylor's final appearance in the tournament and his last major tournament win.

== Prize money ==
The prize fund increased from £450,000 to £500,000, with the winner's earnings increasing from £100,000 to £115,000.

Position (no. of players)		Prize money (Total: £500,000)
Winner	(1)	£115,000
Runner-up	(1)	£55,000
Semi-finalists	(2)	£30,000
Quarter-finalists	(4)	£17,500
Second round	(8)	£11,000
First round	(16)	£7,000

== Format ==
In previous stagings of the event all games had to be won by two clear legs with no sudden-death legs. However, in 2013 after consulting the host broadcaster Sky Sports, the PDC decided that games will now only proceed for a maximum of six extra legs before a tie-break leg is required. For example, in a best of 19 legs first round match, if the score reaches 12–12 then the 25th leg will be the decider.

== Qualification ==
The top 16 players on the PDC Order of Merit as of July 10, 2017 were seeded for the tournament. The top 16 players on the ProTour Order of Merit not to have already qualified will be unseeded.

The following players qualified for the tournament:

=== PDC Order of Merit Top 16 ===
1. (Netherlands) Michael van Gerwen (quarter-finals)
2. (Scotland) Gary Anderson (second round)
3. (Scotland) Peter Wright (runner-up)
4. (England) Adrian Lewis (semi-finals)
5. (England) Dave Chisnall (second round)
6. (England) James Wade (first round)
7. (Austria) Mensur Suljović (quarter-finals)
8. (England) Phil Taylor (winner)
9. (Netherlands) Raymond van Barneveld (second round)
10. (Netherlands) Jelle Klaasen (first round)
11. (England) Michael Smith (first round)
12. (Belgium) Kim Huybrechts (first round)
13. (England) Ian White (first round)
14. (Scotland) Robert Thornton (first round)
15. (Netherlands) Benito van de Pas (first round)
16. (Australia) Simon Whitlock (second round)

=== PDC ProTour qualifiers ===
1. (Northern Ireland) Daryl Gurney (semi-finals)
2. (England) Alan Norris (quarter-finals)
3. (England) Joe Cullen (first round)
4. (England) Rob Cross (second round)
5. (England) Mervyn King (first round)
6. (Wales) Gerwyn Price (first round)
7. (Spain) Cristo Reyes (second round)
8. (England) Stephen Bunting (first round)
9. (England) Darren Webster (quarter-finals)
10. (England) Steve Beaton (first round)
11. (England) James Wilson (first round)
12. (England) Steve West (second round)
13. (Australia) Kyle Anderson (first round)
14. (Scotland) John Henderson (first round)
15. (Netherlands) Christian Kist (first round)
16. (England) Justin Pipe (second round)

== Draw ==
First round (best of 19 legs); 22–24 July
1	(Netherlands) Michael van Gerwen 98.55	10
(England) Stephen Bunting 94.54	4
16	(Australia) Simon Whitlock 95.77	10
(Australia) Kyle Anderson 96.64	5
8	(England) Phil Taylor 94.04	10
(Wales) Gerwyn Price 88.68	5
9	(Netherlands) Raymond van Barneveld 92.42	10
(England) Joe Cullen 96.95	8
5	(England) Dave Chisnall 95.16	10
(England) Mervyn King 89.22	7
12	(Belgium) Kim Huybrechts 93.45	6
(England) Alan Norris 90.59	10
4	(England) Adrian Lewis 95.07	10
(England) Steve Beaton 94.51	7
13	(England) Ian White 94.61	7
(England) Rob Cross 95.72	10
2	(Scotland) Gary Anderson 101.95	10
(Netherlands) Christian Kist 99.96	7
15	(Netherlands) Benito van de Pas 89.53	9
(Northern Ireland) Daryl Gurney 96.98	11
7	(Austria) Mensur Suljović 94.42	10
(Scotland) John Henderson 86.35	4
10	(Netherlands) Jelle Klaasen 89.34	5
(England) Justin Pipe 90.94	10
6	(England) James Wade 96.08	11
(England) Darren Webster 96.48	13
11	(England) Michael Smith 95.45	5
(England) Steve West 99.94	10
3	(Scotland) Peter Wright 89.26	10
(England) James Wilson 90.51	8
14	(Scotland) Robert Thornton 90.82	3
(Spain) Cristo Reyes 101.32	10

Second round (best of 21 legs); 25–26 July
1	(Netherlands) Michael van Gerwen 99.97	11
16	(Australia) Simon Whitlock 91.37	3
8	(England) Phil Taylor 102.27	11
9	(Netherlands) Raymond van Barneveld 98.92	3
5	(England) Dave Chisnall 96.90	12
(England) Alan Norris 98.61	14
4	(England) Adrian Lewis 100.93	11
(England) Rob Cross 104.08	8
2	(Scotland) Gary Anderson 105.17	9
(Northern Ireland) Daryl Gurney 103.26	11
7	(Austria) Mensur Suljović 95.57	11
(England) Justin Pipe 92.07	6
(England) Darren Webster 95.39	11
(England) Steve West 95.39	7
3	(Scotland) Peter Wright 104.18	11
(Spain) Cristo Reyes 93.64	4

Quarter-finals (best of 31 legs); 27–28 July
1	(Netherlands) Michael van Gerwen 101.07	6
8	(England) Phil Taylor 101.85	16
(England) Alan Norris 91.31	13
4	(England) Adrian Lewis 94.16	16
(Northern Ireland) Daryl Gurney 97.18	16
7	(Austria) Mensur Suljović 99.45	13
(England) Darren Webster 95.55	12
3	(Scotland) Peter Wright 100.19	16

Semi-finals (best of 33 legs); 29 July
8	(England) Phil Taylor 102.74	17
4	(England) Adrian Lewis 93.50	9
(Northern Ireland) Daryl Gurney 94.40	15
3	(Scotland) Peter Wright 93.92	17

Final (best of 35 legs); 30 July
8	(England) Phil Taylor 104.24	18
3	(Scotland) Peter Wright 99.74	8

== Statistics ==
Player	Eliminated	Played	Legs Won	Legs Lost	LWAT	100+	140+	180s	High checkout	3-dart average	Checkout success
(England) Phil Taylor	Winner	5	72	31		135	105	31	151	101.03	48.37%
(Scotland) Peter Wright	Final	5	62	57		170	121	21	147	97.46	41.36%
(Northern Ireland) Daryl Gurney	Semi-finals	4	53	48		114	83	37	146	97.96	43.18%
(England) Adrian Lewis	Semi-finals	4	46	45		101	77	24	144	95.92	42.69%
(Netherlands) Michael van Gerwen	Quarter-finals	3	27	23		54	45	14	160	99.86	34.49%
(Austria) Mensur Suljović	Quarter-finals	3	34	26		73	51	13	148	96.48	48.52%
(England) Darren Webster	Quarter-finals	3	36	34		100	60	14	133	95.81	36.95%
(England) Alan Norris	Quarter-finals	3	37	34		87	49	15	155	93.51	38.71%
(Scotland) Gary Anderson	Second round	2	19	18		37	26	16	104	103.56	35.24%
(England) Rob Cross	Second round	2	18	18		46	25	10	125	99.90	44.70%
(England) Steve West	Second round	2	17	16		44	26	10	135	97.67	42.33%
(Spain) Cristo Reyes	Second round	2	14	14		38	15	8	116	97.48	49.41%
(England) Dave Chisnall	Second round	2	22	21		49	30	18	121	96.03	31.13%
(Netherlands) Raymond van Barneveld	Second round	2	13	19		32	31	10	124	95.67	27.38%
(Australia) Simon Whitlock	Second round	2	13	16		38	16	5	119	93.57	35.00%
(England) Justin Pipe	Second round	2	16	16		41	19	12	120	91.51	29.26%
(Netherlands) Christian Kist	First round	1	7	10		16	12	9	100	99.96	43.75%
(England) Joe Cullen	First round	1	8	10		20	10	5	150	96.95	44.44%
(Australia) Kyle Anderson	First round	1	5	10		19	3	6	105	96.64	55.56%
(England) James Wade	First round	1	11	13		42	18	2	121	96.08	55.00%
(England) Michael Smith	First round	1	5	10		18	6	4	80	95.45	45.45%
(England) Ian White	First round	1	7	10		22	17	2	74	94.61	30.43%
(England) Stephen Bunting	First round	1	4	10		16	11	3	102	94.54	22.22%
(England) Steve Beaton	First round	1	7	10		22	12	1	100	94.51	43.75%
(Belgium) Kim Huybrechts	First round	1	6	10		21	8	5	72	93.45	28.57%
(Scotland) Robert Thornton	First round	1	3	10		15	8	1	62	90.82	25.00%
(England) James Wilson	First round	1	8	10		22	10	4	127	90.51	33.33%
(Netherlands) Benito van de Pas	First round	1	9	11		28	16	1	170	89.53	27.27%
(Netherlands) Jelle Klaasen	First round	1	5	10		16	8	3	76	89.34	26.32%
(England) Mervyn King	First round	1	7	10		13	13	3	90	89.22	28.00%
(Wales) Gerwyn Price	First round	1	7	10		20	7	1	170	88.68	31.25%
(Scotland) John Henderson	First round	1	4	10		18	9	1	97	86.35	30.77%

Source: Match reports from the draw.
