= 2018 German Darts Open =

Tournament information
- Dates: 13–15 April 2018
- Venue: Saarlandhalle
- Location: Saarbrücken
- Country: Germany
- Organisation(s): PDC
- Format: Legs
- Prize fund: £135,000
- Winner's share: £25,000
- High checkout: 167 (Republic of Ireland) Steve Lennon (first round)

Champion(s)
- (Germany) Max Hopp

The 2018 German Darts Open was the third of thirteen PDC European Tour events on the 2018 PDC Pro Tour. The tournament took place at Saarlandhalle, Saarbrücken, Germany, between 13–15 April 2018. It featured a field of 48 players and £135,000 in prize money, with £25,000 going to the winner.

Peter Wright was the defending champion after defeating Benito van de Pas 6–5 in the final of the 2017 tournament, but he was knocked out in the second round of the tournament by Germany's Max Hopp.

Hopp went on to win his first PDC senior event, after defeating Michael Smith 8–7 in the final.

Hopp also became the first Host Nation Qualifier to make the final of an event of the PDC European Tour. It also marks the first time a German player won a PDC tour event. Noticeably, Hopp won both his semi-final and final match with a 121 finish on the bullseye, with his opponents waiting on a two-dart finish.

== Prize money ==
This is how the prize money is divided:

Stage (num. of players)		Prize money
Winner	(1)	£25,000
Runner-up	(1)	£10,000
Semi-finalists	(2)	£6,000
Quarter-finalists	(4)	£4,000
Third round losers	(8)	£3,000
Second round losers	(16)	£2,000
First round losers	(16)	£1,000
Total	£135,000	

Prize money will count towards the PDC Order of Merit, the ProTour Order of Merit and the European Tour Order of Merit, with one exception: should a seeded player lose in the second round (last 32), their prize money will not count towards any Orders of Merit, although they still receive the full prize money payment.

== Qualification and format ==
The top 16 entrants from the PDC ProTour Order of Merit on 27 February will automatically qualify for the event and will be seeded in the second round.

The remaining 32 places will go to players from five qualifying events – 18 from the UK Qualifier (held in Barnsley on 9 March), eight from the West/South European Qualifier (held on 12 April), four from the Host Nation Qualifier (held on 12 April), one from the Nordic & Baltic Qualifier (held on 27 January) and one from the East European Qualifier (held on 27 January).

Simon Whitlock withdrew with illness on the day of the tournament, so Daniel Larsson, who was due to face him in round 2, was given a bye to round 3.

The following players will take part in the tournament:

Top 16
1. (Netherlands) Michael van Gerwen (quarter-finals)
2. (Scotland) Peter Wright (second round)
3. (England) Rob Cross (semi-finals)
4. (England) Michael Smith (runner-up)
5. (Northern Ireland) Daryl Gurney (third round)
6. (Austria) Mensur Suljović (third round)
7. (England) Joe Cullen (quarter-finals)
8. (England) Dave Chisnall (third round)
9. (England) Ian White (semi-finals)
10. (Australia) ~~Simon Whitlock (withdrew)~~
11. (Wales) Gerwyn Price (quarter-finals)
12. (England) Mervyn King (quarter-finals)
13. (Netherlands) Jelle Klaasen (third round)
14. (England) Darren Webster (third round)
15. (Netherlands) Benito van de Pas (third round)
16. (England) Steve Beaton (second round)

UK Qualifier
- (Republic of Ireland) William O'Connor (first round)
- (England) Terry Jenkins (first round)
- (England) Kirk Shepherd (second round)
- (England) Luke Humphries (second round)
- (England) Nathan Aspinall (first round)
- (England) Alan Tabern (third round)
- (England) James Wade (second round)
- (England) Richard North (first round)
- (Scotland) Robert Thornton (first round)
- (Australia) Paul Nicholson (second round)
- (England) Steve West (second round)
- (England) Keegan Brown (first round)
- (England) Ricky Williams (first round)
- (England) Matthew Edgar (first round)
- (Republic of Ireland) Steve Lennon (second round)
- (England) Luke Woodhouse (first round)
- (Scotland) Cameron Menzies (second round)
- (England) Simon Stevenson (first round)

West/South European Qualifier
- (Netherlands) Jermaine Wattimena (second round)
- (Netherlands) Maik Kuivenhoven (second round)
- (Belgium) Dimitri Van den Bergh (second round)
- (Netherlands) Jan Dekker (first round)
- (Netherlands) Danny Noppert (second round)
- (Spain) José Justicia (second round)
- (Austria) Zoran Lerchbacher (first round)
- (Belgium) Ronny Huybrechts (first round)

Host Nation Qualifier
- (Germany) Max Hopp (winner)
- (Germany) René Eidams (second round)
- (Germany) Tobias Müller (first round)
- (Germany) Dragutin Horvat (first round)

Nordic & Baltic Qualifier
- (Sweden) Daniel Larsson (third round)

East European Qualifier
- (Poland) Tytus Kanik (first round)

== Draw ==
First round (best of 11 legs); 13 April
(England) Richard North 95.64	4
(Netherlands) Danny Noppert 93.97	6
(England) Alan Tabern 98.83	6
(Germany) Dragutin Horvat 91.23	4
(England) Luke Woodhouse 85.24	4
(Spain) José Justicia 77.07	6
(England) Terry Jenkins 88.23	4
(Scotland) Cameron Menzies 94.25	6
(Germany) René Eidams 79.81	6
(England) Ricky Williams 73.47	4
(England) James Wade 93.46	6
(Poland) Tytus Kanik 85.69	2
(Scotland) Robert Thornton 82.17	0
(Republic of Ireland) Steve Lennon 96.97	6
(Netherlands) Maik Kuivenhoven 90.03	6
(Germany) Tobias Müller 78.11	1
(Germany) Max Hopp 99.49	6
(Austria) Zoran Lerchbacher 85.79	1
(Australia) Paul Nicholson 92.17	6
(England) Nathan Aspinall 87.00	2
(Belgium) Ronny Huybrechts 94.82	3
(England) Luke Humphries 103.63	6
(Netherlands) Jan Dekker 91.72	2
(Sweden) Daniel Larsson 92.82	6
(Netherlands) Jermaine Wattimena 88.41	6
(England) Keegan Brown 61.06	0
(England) Kirk Shepherd 94.31	6
(England) Simon Stevenson 86.33	1
(Belgium) Dimitri Van den Bergh 98.13	6
(Republic of Ireland) William O'Connor 90.77	3
(England) Steve West 99.23	6
(England) Matthew Edgar 90.08	2

Second round (best of 11 legs); 14 April
1	(Netherlands) Michael van Gerwen 95.86	6
(Netherlands) Danny Noppert 87.91	1
16	(England) Steve Beaton 89.55	2
(England) Alan Tabern 94.13	6
8	(England) Dave Chisnall 108.65	6
(Spain) José Justicia 89.54	0
9	(England) Ian White 83.67	6
(Scotland) Cameron Menzies 84.25	3
5	(Northern Ireland) Daryl Gurney 92.68	6
(Germany) René Eidams 81.72	1
12	(England) Mervyn King 94.20	6
(England) James Wade 95.03	3
4	(England) Michael Smith 95.69	6
(Republic of Ireland) Steve Lennon 92.77	4
13	(Netherlands) Jelle Klaasen 83.56	6
(Netherlands) Maik Kuivenhoven 78.54	1
2	(Scotland) Peter Wright 91.65	4
(Germany) Max Hopp 94.26	6
15	(Netherlands) Benito van de Pas 85.98	6
(Australia) Paul Nicholson 86.48	5
7	(England) Joe Cullen 92.45	6
(England) Luke Humphries 92.60	5
10	(Australia) Simon Whitlock	w/d
(Sweden) Daniel Larsson	w/o
6	(Austria) Mensur Suljović 94.86	6
(Netherlands) Jermaine Wattimena 88.25	2
11	(Wales) Gerwyn Price 93.75	6
(England) Kirk Shepherd 87.39	4
3	(England) Rob Cross 103.66	6
(Belgium) Dimitri Van den Bergh 88.36	0
14	(England) Darren Webster 103.38	6
(England) Steve West 101.19	2

Third round (best of 11 legs); 15 April
1	(Netherlands) van Gerwen 98.72	6
(England) Tabern 90.36	4
8	(England) Chisnall 90.30	0
9	(England) White 106.09	6
5	(Northern Ireland) Gurney 97.46	5
12	(England) King 98.54	6
4	(England) Smith 100.70	6
13	(Netherlands) Klaasen 93.07	3
(Germany) Hopp 84.21	6
15	(Netherlands) van de Pas 81.46	4
7	(England) Cullen 93.66	6
(Sweden) Larsson 81.29	2
6	(Austria) Suljović 100.13	5
11	(Wales) Price 98.15	6
3	(England) Cross 99.80	6
14	(England) Webster 86.63	4

Quarter-finals (best of 11 legs); 15 April
1	(Netherlands) van Gerwen 100.23	2
9	(England) White 105.92	6
12	(England) King 93.14	5
4	(England) Smith 99.52	6
(Germany) Hopp 96.89	6
7	(England) Cullen 98.10	4
11	(Wales) Price 92.67	1
3	(England) Cross 105.09	6

Semi-finals (best of 13 legs); 15 April
9	(England) White 96.20	1
4	(England) Smith 107.24	7
(Germany) Hopp 100.23	7
3	(England) Cross 99.19	6

Final (best of 15 legs); 15 April
4	(England) Smith 95.17	7
(Germany) Hopp 94.62	8
