= 2017 Dutch Darts Masters =

Tournament information
- Dates: 1–3 September 2017
- Venue: MECC Maastricht
- Location: Maastricht, Netherlands
- Organisation(s): Professional Darts Corporation (PDC)
- Format: Legs; First to 6 legs
- Prize fund: £135,000
- Winner's share: £25,000
- High checkout: 170; Krzysztof Ratajski; Kirk Shepherd

Champion(s)
- Michael van Gerwen (NED)

The 2017 Dutch Darts Masters was the ninth of twelve PDC European Tour events on the 2017 PDC Pro Tour. The tournament took place at MECC Maastricht, Maastricht, Netherlands, from 1 to 3 September 2017. It featured a field of 48 players and £135,000 in prize money, with £25,000 going to the winner.

Michael van Gerwen was the defending champion after defeating Daryl Gurney 6–2 in the final of the 2016 tournament, and he retained his title for the 4th consecutive year by defeating Steve Beaton 6–1 in the final.

9 of the 16 seeds lost their first match, thus resulting in the most seeds losing in the secomd round of a European Tour event (since the adaption of 16 seeds in the second round in 2014) until the 2019 Czech Darts Open which then saw 11 out of 16 seeds lost in their opening match.

== Prize money ==
This is how the prize money is divided:

Stage (num. of players)		Prize money
Winner	(1)	£25,000
Runner-up	(1)	£10,000
Semi-finalists	(2)	£6,000
Quarter-finalists	(4)	£4,000
Third round losers	(8)	£3,000
Second round losers	(16)	£2,000
First round losers	(16)	£1,000
Total	£135,000	

== Qualification and format ==
The top 16 entrants from the PDC ProTour Order of Merit on 30 June automatically qualified for the event and were seeded in the second round.

The remaining 32 places went to players from five qualifying events – 18 from the UK Qualifier (held in Barnsley on 7 July), eight from the West/South European Qualifier (held on 31 August), four from the Host Nation Qualifier (held on 31 August), one from the Nordic & Baltic Qualifier (held on 19 May) and one from the East European Qualifier (held on 25 August).

The following players took part in the tournament:

Top 16
1. (Netherlands) Michael van Gerwen (winner)
2. (Scotland) Peter Wright (semi-finals)
3. (Austria) Mensur Suljović (second round)
4. (Australia) Simon Whitlock (third round)
5. (England) Michael Smith (semi-finals)
6. (England) Ian White (second round)
7. (Belgium) Kim Huybrechts (second round)
8. (Netherlands) Benito van de Pas (second round)
9. (Northern Ireland) Daryl Gurney (quarter-finals)
10. (Netherlands) Jelle Klaasen (second round)
11. (England) Alan Norris (second round)
12. (England) Joe Cullen (third round)
13. (Spain) Cristo Reyes (second round)
14. (Wales) Gerwyn Price (second round)
15. (England) Rob Cross (third round)
16. (England) Mervyn King (second round)

UK Qualifier
- (England) Nathan Aspinall (third round)
- (England) Steve Beaton (runner-up)
- (England) James Wilson (first round)
- (England) Steve West (second round)
- (Australia) Kyle Anderson (third round)
- (Scotland) Jim Walker (second round)
- (England) Darren Webster (first round)
- (Scotland) John Henderson (quarter-finals)
- (England) Kirk Shepherd (second round)
- (England) Harry Robinson (first round)
- (England) Justin Pipe (first round)
- (England) Chris Quantock (first round)
- (Scotland) Jamie Bain (first round)
- (England) Ryan Searle (first round)
- (Wales) Jamie Lewis (second round)
- (Wales) Robert Owen (quarter-finals)
- (Republic of Ireland) Steve Lennon (first round)
- (England) Richard North (first round)

West/South European Qualifier
- (Germany) René Berndt (first round)
- (Germany) Max Hopp (first round)
- (Germany) Nico Blum (first round)
- (Belgium) Mike De Decker (third round)
- (Germany) Martin Schindler (third round)
- (Belgium) Ronny Huybrechts (first round)
- (Austria) Rowby-John Rodriguez (second round)
- (Greece) John Michael (first round)

Host Nation Qualifier
- (Netherlands) Jimmy Hendriks (second round)
- (Netherlands) Christian Kist (third round)
- (Netherlands) Justin van Tergouw (first round)
- (Netherlands) Jeffrey de Zwaan (second round)

Nordic & Baltic Qualifier
- (Finland) Ulf Ceder (first round)

East European Qualifier
- (Poland) Krzysztof Ratajski (quarter-finals)

== Draw ==
First round (best of 11 legs); 1 September
(Greece) John Michael 92.03	4
(Netherlands) Jeffrey de Zwaan 91.63	6
(Australia) Kyle Anderson 108.96	6
(England) Justin Pipe 99.94	4
(England) Nathan Aspinall 95.66	6
(Finland) Ulf Ceder 86.96	4
(England) Steve West 87.96	6
(England) Ryan Searle 84.18	5
(England) James Wilson 89.78	3
(Austria) Rowby-John Rodriguez 94.40	6
(Netherlands) Jimmy Hendriks 89.20	6
(Germany) René Berndt 100.69	5
(Germany) Max Hopp 100.01	4
(England) Kirk Shepherd 91.31	6
(Wales) Robert Owen 85.89	6
(Scotland) Jamie Bain 84.82	0
(England) Darren Webster 88.27	5
(Scotland) Jim Walker 90.49	6
(Wales) Jamie Lewis 95.58	6
(England) Harry Robinson 81.65	2
(Netherlands) Christian Kist 89.64	6
(Netherlands) Justin van Tergouw 88.59	5
(Poland) Krzysztof Ratajski 102.48	6
(Republic of Ireland) Steve Lennon 91.41	0
(Scotland) John Henderson 90.51	6
(Belgium) Ronny Huybrechts 88.69	4
(England) Richard North 87.85	3
(Belgium) Mike De Decker 96.00	6
(England) Steve Beaton 85.60	6
(Germany) Nico Blum 80.32	4
(England) Chris Quantock 90.69	4
(Germany) Martin Schindler 88.34	6

Second round (best of 11 legs); 2 September
1	(Netherlands) Michael van Gerwen 99.66	6
(Netherlands) Jeffrey de Zwaan 88.01	1
16	(England) Mervyn King 103.01	3
(Australia) Kyle Anderson 100.71	6
8	(Netherlands) Benito van de Pas 88.28	1
(England) Nathan Aspinall 102.24	6
9	(Northern Ireland) Daryl Gurney 102.80	6
(England) Steve West 95.78	2
5	(England) Michael Smith 87.15	6
(Austria) Rowby-John Rodriguez 79.42	2
12	(England) Joe Cullen 94.63	6
(Netherlands) Jimmy Hendriks 86.44	5
4	(Australia) Simon Whitlock 101.75	6
(England) Kirk Shepherd 98.40	4
13	(Spain) Cristo Reyes 88.33	5
(Wales) Robert Owen 92.38	6
2	(Scotland) Peter Wright 87.13	6
(Scotland) Jim Walker 83.54	5
15	(England) Rob Cross 105.58	6
(Wales) Jamie Lewis 93.60	1
7	(Belgium) Kim Huybrechts 90.96	4
(Netherlands) Christian Kist 94.39	6
10	(Netherlands) Jelle Klaasen 90.07	3
(Poland) Krzysztof Ratajski 97.11	6
6	(England) Ian White 100.80	3
(Scotland) John Henderson 104.30	6
11	(England) Alan Norris 92.60	5
(Belgium) Mike De Decker 87.66	6
3	(Austria) Mensur Suljović 89.78	3
(England) Steve Beaton 86.78	6
14	(Wales) Gerwyn Price 96.73	5
(Germany) Martin Schindler 92.85	6

Third round (best of 11 legs); 3 September
1	(Netherlands) van Gerwen 107.60	6
(Australia) Anderson 100.96	1
(England) Aspinall 84.40	2
9	(Northern Ireland) Gurney 88.50	6
5	(England) Smith 93.23	6
12	(England) Cullen 89.62	2
4	(Australia) Whitlock 86.13	4
(Wales) Owen 91.19	6
2	(Scotland) Wright 92.84	6
15	(England) Cross 94.48	3
(Netherlands) Kist 91.88	1
(Poland) Ratajski 104.58	6
(Scotland) Henderson 95.23	6
(Belgium) De Decker 89.26	2
(England) Beaton 99.10	6
(Germany) Schindler 92.80	4

Quarter-finals (best of 11 legs); 3 September
1	(Netherlands) van Gerwen 104.13	6
9	(Northern Ireland) Gurney 94.47	5
5	(England) Smith 89.76	6
(Wales) Owen 90.64	5
2	(Scotland) Wright 91.42	6
(Poland) Ratajski 90.02	3
(Scotland) Henderson 94.43	2
(England) Beaton 102.62	6

Semi-finals (best of 11 legs); 3 September
1	(Netherlands) van Gerwen 100.42	6
5	(England) Smith 104.12	2
2	(Scotland) Wright 95.27	4
(England) Beaton 101.26	6

Final (best of 11 legs); 3 September
1	(Netherlands) van Gerwen 99.59	6
(England) Beaton 98.54	1
