= Three-dart average =

Best averages achieved by darts players

The three-dart average in darts is the average of the total score achieved with each turn of three darts.

Averages are the most cited statistics in matches as they give a rough estimate of a player's form. The longer a match lasts, the harder it is to maintain a high average, as low-scoring legs or missed darts when aiming for a double bring the average down.

While there have been match averages of over 130 in floor tournaments, the world record only lists televised matches, which are easy to verify.

== Definition ==
To compute the three-dart average, the total amount of points scored is divided by the number of darts thrown, and then multiplied by three to find the average score per round. On occasion the one-dart average (the above measure but not multiplied by three) is used instead.

If a player busts their score on their first or second throw in a visit, then that counts as a complete visit and is counted as three darts thrown.

If the winning dart is in the first or second dart thrown in a visit, only those darts are counted as thrown for that visit (the one or two darts not thrown are not counted).

== History ==
Michael van Gerwen is the current world record holder for a televised match with a three-dart average of 123.40 thrown in the 2016 Premier League against Michael Smith.

Gary Anderson holds the record for highest Professional Darts Corporation live streamed match average (123.83), at Players Championship 15 in 2024.

Bobby George was the first player to throw an average of over 100 on television during the 1979 News of the World Darts Championship final against Alan Glazier.

Luke Littler is the current world record holder for highest three-dart average in a set at a PDC World Darts Championship with a three-dart average of 140.91 thrown in the final set of his 2025 PDC World Championship second round match against Ryan Meikle. The record was previously held by Gerwyn Price with a 136.64 three-dart average in the sixth set of the 2021 PDC World Championship final against Gary Anderson.

== Televised high averages ==
Key

- (l) - score in legs
- (s) - score in sets

=== Men ===
Televised averages of 114 points or more
Average	Date	Player	Score	Opponent _{Average}	Tournament	Stage	Broadcast	Ref.
123.40	25 February 2016	Michael van Gerwen	7–1	Michael Smith 91.41	2016 Premier League	League	Sky Sports	
121.97	4 June 2017	Kim Huybrechts	4–1	Paul Lim 100.40	2017 World Cup	Quarter Final	Sky Sports	
120.24	24 July 2024	Connor Scutt	4–0	Steven Jamieson 82.75	MODUS Super Series	Group Stage	YouTube	
120.24	15 May 2025	David Evans	4–0	Mervyn King 82.75	MODUS Super Series	Group Stage		
120.24	9 August 2025	Danny van Trijp	4–0	Dean Finn 71.63	MODUS Super Series	Series 11 Week 12 Final		
120.24	17 October 2026	Gian van Veen	6–0	Sebastian Białecki 82.54	2026 Dutch Darts Championship	Second round		
119.50	2 March 2017	Peter Wright	7–2	Adrian Lewis 90.80	2017 Premier League	League	Sky Sports	
118.66	5 June 2010	Phil Taylor	9–0	Kevin Painter 82.85	2010 UK Open	Fourth round	Sky Sports	
118.52	25 November 2023	Michael van Gerwen _{(2)}	6–1	Ross Smith 104.54	2023 Players Championship Finals	Second round	ITV Sport	
118.43	10 April 2025	Luke Humphries	6–1	Stephen Bunting 105.33	2025 Premier League	Night Quarter-Final	Sky Sports	
118.14	1 November 2009	Phil Taylor _{(2)}	10–3	Gary Anderson 106.12	2009 European Championship	Quarter Final	None	
117.95	7 April 2016	Michael van Gerwen _{(3)}	7–5	Robert Thornton 104.23	2016 Premier League	League	Sky Sports	
117.88	1 March 2012	Phil Taylor _{(3)}	8–4	Simon Whitlock 105.44	2012 Premier League	League	Sky Sports	
117.88	19 June 2022	Gerwyn Price	4–0	Martin Schindler 101.31	2022 World Cup	Quarter Final	Sky Sports	
117.88	1 July 2023	Luke Littler	4–0	Andy Baetens 86.59	MODUS Super Series	Final	YouTube	
117.88	25 March 2024	Andreas Harrysson	4–0	Michael Burgoine 81.18	MODUS Super Series	Group Stage	YouTube	
116.90	23 April 2015	Michael van Gerwen _{(4)}	7–0	James Wade 93.93	2015 Premier League	League	Sky Sports	
116.67	3 March 2016	Michael van Gerwen _{(5)}	7–2	Peter Wright 108.98	2016 Premier League	League	Sky Sports	
116.10	3 May 2012	Phil Taylor _{(4)}	8–1	James Wade 93.95	2012 Premier League	League	Sky Sports	
116.01	23 April 2009	Phil Taylor _{(5)}	8–3	John Part 100.05	2009 Premier League	League	Sky Sports	
115.97	13 April 2023	Gerwyn Price _{(2)}	6–2	Chris Dobey 103.27	2023 Premier League	Night Quarter-Final	Sky Sports	
115.96	15 May 2025	Luke Littler _{(2)}	6–3	Luke Humphries 110.01	2025 Premier League	Night Quarter-Final	Sky Sports	
115.80	19 March 2015	Phil Taylor _{(6)}	4–7	Raymond van Barneveld 104.18	2015 Premier League	League	Sky Sports	
115.62	7 June 2009	Phil Taylor _{(7)}	10–0	Mark Lawrence 93.90	2009 UK Open	Quarter Final	Sky Sports	
115.62	3 June 2017	Ronny Huybrechts	4–0	John Michael 88.94	2017 World Cup	Second round	Sky Sports	
115.62	29 October 2021	Mervyn King	6–0	James Wade 86.13	2021 World Series Finals	First round	ITV4	
115.62	26 November 2024	Adam Lipscombe	4–0	Hilton Klein 91.82	MODUS Super Series	Group Stage	YouTube	
115.62	15 January 2025	Richie Howson	4–0	Devon Petersen 91.56	MODUS Super Series	Group Stage	Pluto TV	
115.51	6 June 2009	Phil Taylor _{(8)}	9–3	Ken Mather 93.49	2009 UK Open	Fourth round	Sky Sports	
115.31	17 January 2025	Gerwyn Price _{(3)}	6–2	Luke Littler 105.12	2025 Bahrain Darts Masters	Quarter Final	ITV4	
115.25	25 February 2016	Phil Taylor _{(9)}	7–5	Dave Chisnall 109.63	2016 Premier League	League	Sky Sports	
115.19	14 November 2021	Michael van Gerwen _{(6)}	5–2	Joe Cullen 98.33	2021 Grand Slam	Group Stage	Sky Sports	
115.10	8 June 2019	William O'Connor	4–1	Rob Cross 106.62	2019 World Cup	Second round	Sky Sports	
115.02	16 August 2025	Luke Littler _{(3)}	8–4	Luke Humphries 102.31	2025 New Zealand Darts Masters	Final	ITV Sports	
114.99	17 July 2010	Phil Taylor _{(10)}	10–6	Barrie Bates 93.20	2010 World Matchplay	First round	Sky Sports	
114.96	23 March 2023	Gerwyn Price _{(4)}	6–1	Michael van Gerwen 98.48	2023 Premier League	Night Final	Sky Sports	
114.91	7 March 2015	Michael van Gerwen _{(7)}	9–2	Kim Huybrechts 101.59	2015 UK Open	Fifth round	ITV4	
114.85	16 November 2020	Dimitri Van den Bergh	5–1	Ricky Evans 95.80	2020 Grand Slam	Group Stage	Sky Sports	
114.73	28 April 2022	James Wade	6–1	Gerwyn Price 99.17	2022 Premier League	Night Semi-Final	Sky Sports	
114.71	10 November 2024	Gian van Veen _{(2)}	5–1	Stephen Bunting 104.17	2024 Grand Slam of Darts	Group Stage	Sky Sports	
114.65	9 November 2014	Phil Taylor _{(11)}	5–1	Christian Kist 99.46	2014 Grand Slam	Group Stage	Sky Sports	
114.54	7 June 2008	Phil Taylor _{(12)}	9–3	Wes Newton 97.32	2008 UK Open	Fifth round	Sky Sports	
114.47	24 October 2026	Luke Littler _{(4)}	10–5	Nathan Aspinall 105.57	2026 European Championship	Second round	ITV4	
114.37	22 May 2025	Luke Littler _{(5)}	6–1	Stephen Bunting 94.14	2025 Premier League	Night Quarter-Final	Sky Sports	
114.32	15 November 2026	Rob Cross	5–1	Jonny Clayton 97.21	2026 Grand Slam of Darts	Group Stage	Sky Sports	
114.17	9 April 2015	Dave Chisnall	7–1	James Wade 87.12	2015 Premier League	League	Sky Sports	
114.15	9 May 2004	Darryl Fitton	6–0	Davy Richardson 90.78	2004 International Darts League	Last 32 group	SBS6	
114.05	1 January 2017	Michael van Gerwen _{(8)}	6–2 (s) (Note: Score in sets not legs)	Raymond van Barneveld 109.34	2017 PDC World Championship	Semi Final	Sky Sports	
114.00	14 March 2024	Luke Littler _{(6)}	6–2	Michael van Gerwen 110.94	2024 Premier League	Night Quarter-Final	Sky Sports	

=== Women ===
Televised averages of 95 points or more
Average	Date	Player	Score	Opponent	Tournament	Stage	Broadcast	Ref.
114.56	26 April 2024	Beau Greaves	4–1 (l)	Kevin Painter 88.64	MODUS Super Series 7 (Week 8)	Group Stage	YouTube	
102.46	9 November 2025	Beau Greaves _{(2)}	4–5 (l)	Gary Anderson 103.08	2025 Grand Slam	Group Stage	Sky Sports	
101.55	14 November 2021	Fallon Sherrock	5–0 (l)	Mike De Decker 75.83	2021 Grand Slam	Group Stage	Sky Sports	
101.47	8 November 2025	Beau Greaves _{(3)}	4–5 (l)	Michael van Gerwen 96.80	2025 Grand Slam	Group Stage	Sky Sports	
100.34	5 March 2021	Lisa Ashton	6–2 (l)	Aaron Beeney 86.71	2021 UK Open	Last 128	ITV Sport	
98.90	20 November 2021	Fallon Sherrock _{(2)}	13–16 (l)	Peter Wright 100.33	2021 Grand Slam	Quarter-final	Sky Sports	
98.84	29 May 2016	Lisa Ashton _{(2)}	5–1 (l)	Corrine Hammond 79.08	2016 BDO World Trophy	Last 16	Dave	
98.75	21 July 2024	Beau Greaves _{(4)}	6–3 (l)	Fallon Sherrock 87.60	2024 Women's World Matchplay	Final	Sky Sports	
97.56	4 December 1999	Trina Gulliver	1–3 (s)	Francis Hoenselaar 95.04	1999 World Masters	Final		
96.84	24 October 2004	Trina Gulliver _{(2)}	4–1 (s)	Francis Hoenselaar 81.21	2004 World Masters	Final		
96.20	18 September 2021	Fallon Sherrock _{(3)}	7–11 (l)	Michael van Gerwen 98.54	2021 Nordic Darts Masters	Final	ITV Sport	
96.12	27 July 2025	Beau Greaves _{(5)}	4–1 (l)	Kirsi Viinikainen 73.44	2025 Women's World Matchplay	Quarter-final	Sky Sports	
95.97	12 January 2006	Trina Gulliver _{(3)}	2–0 (s)	Clare Bywaters 68.73	2006 BDO World Darts Championship	Semi-final	BBC Sport	
95.97	28 February 2025	Beau Greaves _{(6)}	6–1 (l)	Stefan Bellmont 84.09	2025 UK Open	Last 160	ITV Sport	
95.04	4 December 1999	Francis Hoenselaar	3–1 (s)	Trina Gulliver 97.56	1999 World Masters	Final		

== Televised high averages world record progression ==
=== Men ===
The world record progression before 1997 is subject to further research.

Average	Date	Player	Opponent	Tournament	Stage	Score	Broadcast	Ref.
123.40	25 February 2016	Michael van Gerwen	Michael Smith 91.41	2016 Premier League	League	7–1 (l)	Sky Sports	
118.66	5 June 2010	Phil Taylor	Kevin Painter 82.85	2010 UK Open	Fourth round	9–0 (l)	Sky Sports	
116.01	23 April 2009	Phil Taylor	John Part 100.05	2009 Premier League	League	8–3 (l)	Sky Sports	
114.54	7 June 2008	Phil Taylor	Wes Newton 97.32	2008 UK Open	Fifth round	9–3 (l)	Sky Sports	
114.15	9 May 2004	Darryl Fitton	Davy Richardson 90.78	2004 International Darts League	Last 32 group	6–0 (l)	SBS6	
113.43	28 July 1997	Phil Taylor	Gary Mawson 95.22	1997 World Matchplay	First round	8–0 (l)	Sky Sports	
107.49	5 December 1991	Phil Taylor	Alan Warriner-Little n/a	1991 World Masters	Quarter final	3–1 (s)	Sky Sports	
105.30	17 September 1983	Eric Bristow	Alan Glazier n/a	1983 British Professional Championship	Last 32	3–0 (s)	BBC	
100.20	2 June 1979	Bobby George	Alan Glazier 71.33	News of the World Darts Championship	Final	2–0 (l)	ITV	

=== Women ===
Average	Date	Player	Opponent	Tournament	Stage	Score	Broadcast	Ref.
114.56	26 April 2024	Beau Greaves	Kevin Painter 88.64	MODUS Super Series	Group stage	4–1 (l)		
104.86	18 November 2026	Gemma Hayter	Trina Gulliver 82.46	MODUS Super Series	Group stage	3–0 (l)	Pluto TV	
101.55	14 November 2021	Fallon Sherrock	Mike De Decker 75.83	Grand Slam	Group stage	5–0 (l)	Sky Sports	
100.34	5 March 2021	Lisa Ashton	Aaron Beeney 86.71	UK Open	Second Round (Last 128)	6–2 (l)	ITV Sport	
98.84	29 May 2016	Lisa Ashton	Corrine Hammond 79.08	BDO World Trophy	Last 16	5–1 (l)	Dave	
97.56	4 December 1999	Trina Gulliver	Francis Hoenselaar 95.04	World Masters	Final	1–3 (s)		

== Televised pairs high averages ==
Average	Date	Players	Opponents		Tournament	Stage	Score	Broadcast	Ref.
118.10	16 June 2023	Krzysztof Ratajski; Krzysztof Kciuk	Darius Labanauskas; Mindaugas Barauskas	86.75	2023 PDC World Cup	Group stage	4–1 (l)	Sky Sports	
117.88	8 June 2014	Michael van Gerwen; Raymond van Barneveld	Brendan Dolan; Mickey Mansell	95.19	2014 PDC World Cup	Semi-final	4–0 (l)	Sky Sports	
111.33	3 June 2017	Michael van Gerwen; Raymond van Barneveld	Darin Young; Larry Butler	85.82	2017 PDC World Cup	Second round	4–0 (l)	Sky Sports	
109.33	2 June 2017	Michael van Gerwen; Raymond van Barneveld	Karel Sedláček; František Humpula	88.23	2017 PDC World Cup	First round	5–1 (l)	Sky Sports	
109.31	19 June 2022	Damon Heta; Simon Whitlock	Dimitri Van den Bergh; Kim Huybrechts	87.24	2022 PDC World Cup	Quarter-final	4–0 (l)	Sky Sports	
108.41	4 December 2010	Paul Nicholson; Simon Whitlock	John Part; Ken MacNeil	99.00	2010 PDC World Cup	Group stage	3–1 (l)	Sky Sports	
107.77	5 June 2016	Michael van Gerwen; Raymond van Barneveld	Simon Whitlock; Kyle Anderson	96.77	2016 PDC World Cup	Quarter-final	4–3 (l)	Sky Sports	
107.36	14 June 2015	Michael van Gerwen; Raymond van Barneveld	Brendan Dolan; Mickey Mansell	92.39	2015 PDC World Cup	Quarter-final	4–0 (l)	Sky Sports	
105.48	3 February 2013	Kim Huybrechts; Ronny Huybrechts	Jani Haavisto; Jarkko Komula	86.22	2013 PDC World Cup	Semi-final	4–0 (l)	Sky Sports	
105.17	4 June 2017	Michael van Gerwen; Raymond van Barneveld	Martin Schindler; Max Hopp	96.17	2017 PDC World Cup	Quarter-final	4–1 (l)	Sky Sports	
104.97	9 September 2021	Krzysztof Ratajski; Krzysztof Kciuk	Karel Sedláček; Adam Gawlas	103.47	2021 PDC World Cup	First round	5–2 (l)	Sky Sports	
104.77	14 June 2026	Luke Littler; Luke Humphries	Gian van Veen; Michael van Gerwen	98.30	2026 PDC World Cup	Final	10–5 (l)	Sky Sports	
103.93	12 September 2021	Gerwyn Price; Jonny Clayton	John Henderson; Peter Wright	96.03	2021 PDC World Cup	Semi-final	3–4 (l)	Sky Sports	
103.52	8 November 2020	Gerwyn Price; Jonny Clayton	Michael Smith; Rob Cross	94.85	2020 PDC World Cup	Final	4–3 (l)	Sky Sports	
103.47	9 September 2021	Karel Sedláček; Adam Gawlas	Krzysztof Ratajski; Krzysztof Kciuk	104.97	2021 PDC World Cup	First round	2–5 (l)	Sky Sports	
103.20	14 June 2015	Phil Taylor; Adrian Lewis	Peter Wright; Gary Anderson	95.71	2015 PDC World Cup	Final	4–3 (l)	Sky Sports	
102.95	1 June 2018	Michael van Gerwen; Raymond van Barneveld	Dyson Parody; Justin Broton	66.38	2018 PDC World Cup	First round	5–0 (l)	Sky Sports	
102.68	14 June 2026	Gian van Veen; Michael van Gerwen	Martin Schindler; Ricardo Pietreczko	96.58	2026 PDC World Cup	Quarter-final	8–4 (l)	Sky Sports	
102.35	4 December 2010	Robert Thornton; Gary Anderson	Darin Young (United States) Bill Davis	96.34	2010 PDC World Cup	Group stage	3–2 (l)	Sky Sports	
102.18	4 February 2012	Simon Whitlock; Paul Nicholson	Kurt van de Rijck; Kim Huybrechts	98.58	2012 PDC World Cup	Quarter-final	4–2 (l)	Sky Sports	
101.90	7 November 2020	Gerwyn Price; Jonny Clayton	John Henderson; Robert Thornton	89.42	2020 PDC World Cup	Second round	4–0 (l)	Sky Sports	
101.90	11 June 2026	Martin Schindler; Ricardo Pietreczko	Alexis Toylo; Paolo Nebrida	78.20	2026 PDC World Cup	Group stage	4–0 (l)	Sky Sports	
101.59	14 June 2026	Luke Littler; Luke Humphries	Gary Anderson; Cameron Menzies	88.82	2026 PDC World Cup	Semi-final	8–3 (l)	Sky Sports	
101.55	6 June 2019	Gary Anderson; Peter Wright	Per Laursen; Niels Heinsøe	82.75	2019 PDC World Cup	First round	5–0 (l)	Sky Sports	
101.55	14 June 2026	Gian van Veen; Michael van Gerwen	Josh Rock; Daryl Gurney	97.19	2026 PDC World Cup	Semi-final	8–2 (l)	Sky Sports	
101.08	2 February 2013	Kim Huybrechts; Ronny Huybrechts	Simon Whitlock; Paul Nicholson	95.57	2013 PDC World Cup	Second round	5–1 (l)	Sky Sports	
100.96	29 June 2024	Michael van Gerwen; Danny Noppert	Dimitri Van den Bergh; Kim Huybrechts	97.31	2024 PDC World Cup	Second round	2–8 (l)	Sky Sports	
100.69	3 June 2018	Michael van Gerwen; Raymond van Barneveld	Peter Wright; Gary Anderson	98.45	2018 PDC World Cup	Final	4–1 (l)	Sky Sports	
100.62	29 June 2024	Luke Humphries; Michael Smith	Rowby-John Rodriguez; Mensur Suljović	87.96	2024 PDC World Cup	Final	10–6 (l)	Sky Sports	
100.20	3 June 2018	Kim Huybrechts; Dimitri Van den Bergh	Rob Cross; Dave Chisnall	87.40	2018 PDC World Cup	Quarter-final	4–0 (l)	Sky Sports	
100.20	9 June 2019	Steve Lennon; William O'Connor	Michael van Gerwen; Jermaine Wattimena	90.84	2019 PDC World Cup	Semi-final	4–0 (l)	Sky Sports	
100.20	14 June 2025	Danny Noppert; Gian van Veen	Gary Anderson; Peter Wright	79.37	2025 PDC World Cup	Second round	8–0 (l)	Sky Sports	
100.14	1 June 2017	Gerwyn Price; Mark Webster	Kim Viljanen; Marko Kantele	92.74	2017 PDC World Cup	First round	5–4 (l)	Sky Sports	

== Televised combined high averages ==
#	Combined average	Date	Winner (average)	Opponent (average)	Tournament	Stage	Score	Broadcast	Ref.
1	228.65 (WR)	2 March 2017	Peter Wright 119.50	Adrian Lewis 109.15	2017 Premier League Darts	League	7–2 (l)	Sky Sports	
2	225.97	15 May 2025	Luke Littler 115.96	Luke Humphries 110.01	2025 Premier League Darts	League	6–3 (l)	Sky Sports	
3	225.65	3 March 2016	Michael van Gerwen 116.67	Peter Wright 108.98	2016 Premier League Darts	League	7–2 (l)	Sky Sports	
4	224.94	14 March 2024	Luke Littler 114.00	Michael van Gerwen 110.94	2024 Premier League Darts	League	6–2 (l)	Sky Sports	
5	224.88	25 February 2016	Phil Taylor 115.25	Dave Chisnall 109.63	2016 Premier League Darts	League	7–5 (l)	Sky Sports	
6	224.44	6 April 2017	Michael van Gerwen 113.62	James Wade 110.82	2017 Premier League Darts	League	7–5 (l)	Sky Sports	

== Highest televised averages by length of match in legs ==
This table shows the highest average for all matches containing at least as many legs as the number in the leftmost column. Set-play matches show the total number of legs won and lost across all sets.

Legs played	Average	Date	Player	Set score	Leg score	Opponent	Tournament
4–8	123.40	25 February 2016	Michael van Gerwen	-	7–1	Michael Smith 91.41	2016 Premier League Darts
9	119.50	2 March 2017	Peter Wright	-	7–2	Adrian Lewis 90.80	2017 Premier League Darts
10–13	118.14	1 November 2009	Phil Taylor	-	10–3	Gary Anderson 106.12	2009 European Championship
14–16	114.99	17 July 2010	Phil Taylor	-	10–6	Barrie Bates 93.20	2010 World Matchplay
17–32	114.05	1 January 2017	Michael van Gerwen	6–2	19–13	Raymond van Barneveld 109.34	2017 PDC World Championship
33–35	110.94	4 January 2009	Phil Taylor	7–1	23–12	Raymond van Barneveld 101.18	2009 PDC World Championship
36–44	108.06	2 January 2017	Michael van Gerwen	7–3	27–17	Gary Anderson 104.93	2017 PDC World Championship
45–48	103.67	3 January 2024	Luke Humphries	7–4	25–23	Luke Littler 101.13	2024 PDC World Championship
49–50	103.04	1 January 2013	Phil Taylor	7–4	27–23	Michael van Gerwen 100.66	2013 PDC World Championship
51–52	102.44	30 December 2017	Michael van Gerwen	5–6	27–27	Rob Cross 100.97	2018 PDC World Championship
53–57	100.93	1 January 2007	Raymond van Barneveld	7–6	29–28	Phil Taylor 100.86	2007 PDC World Championship

== Highest tournament winning averages ==
Ten highest tournament winning averages (Note: These tournament averages (TMA) were calculated by adding up the match averages and then dividing by the number of matches. The "true" tournament averages — which would be calculated by adding up the points scored divided by total darts thrown and multiplying by 3 (3DA) — may differ, but cannot be accurately calculated for most tournaments as this data is unavailable. For example, Michael van Gerwen had a TMA of 106.37 in the 2017 PDC World Darts Championship, but his 3DA over the whole tournament was 107.06.)
Average	Player	Tournament	Year	Ref
111.54	Phil Taylor	European Championship	2009	
111.04	Luke Littler	World Matchplay	2026	
108.20	Phil Taylor	European Championship	2008	
107.58	Michael van Gerwen	European Darts Grand Prix	2018	
107.51	Luke Humphries	German Darts Grand Prix	2024	
107.48	Phil Taylor	RTL7 Masters	2011	
107.48	Michael van Gerwen	Premier League	2016	
107.38	Phil Taylor	UK Open	2009	
106.81	Michael van Gerwen	German Darts Masters	2017	
106.73	Phil Taylor	Premier League	2012	
