= 2016 Premier League Darts =

Darts competition

2016 Betway Premier League Darts

Tournament information
- Dates: 4 February–19 May 2016
- Nine-dart finish: Adrian Lewis

Champion(s)
- Michael van Gerwen (NED)

The 2016 Betway Premier League Darts was a darts tournament organised by the Professional Darts Corporation – the twelfth edition of the tournament.

The event began on 4 February at the Leeds Arena in Leeds and ended with the Play-offs at The O2 Arena in London on 19 May. The tournament saw its first visit to the Netherlands after agreeing to go to the Ahoy Arena in Rotterdam on 12 May, joining 15 other venues across the UK and Ireland. This is the third year that the tournament was sponsored by Betway.

Gary Anderson was the defending champion, but he lost to Phil Taylor 10–7 in the semi-finals. Michael van Gerwen won his second Premier League Darts title by beating Taylor 11–3 in the final.

Van Gerwen also recorded the highest televised 3-dart average of 123.40 against Michael Smith during night 4 in Aberdeen.

== Format ==
The tournament format remained identical to that since 2013. During the first nine weeks (Phase 1) each player plays the other nine players once. The bottom two players are eliminated from the competition. In the next six weeks (phase 2), each player plays the other seven players once. Phase 2 consists of four weeks where five matches are played followed by two weeks where four matches are played. At the end of phase 2 the top four players contest the two semi-finals and the final in the play-off week.

== Venues ==
Rotterdam's Ahoy Arena became the first arena from outside the British Isles to host a Premier League event, it replaced the Brighton Centre.

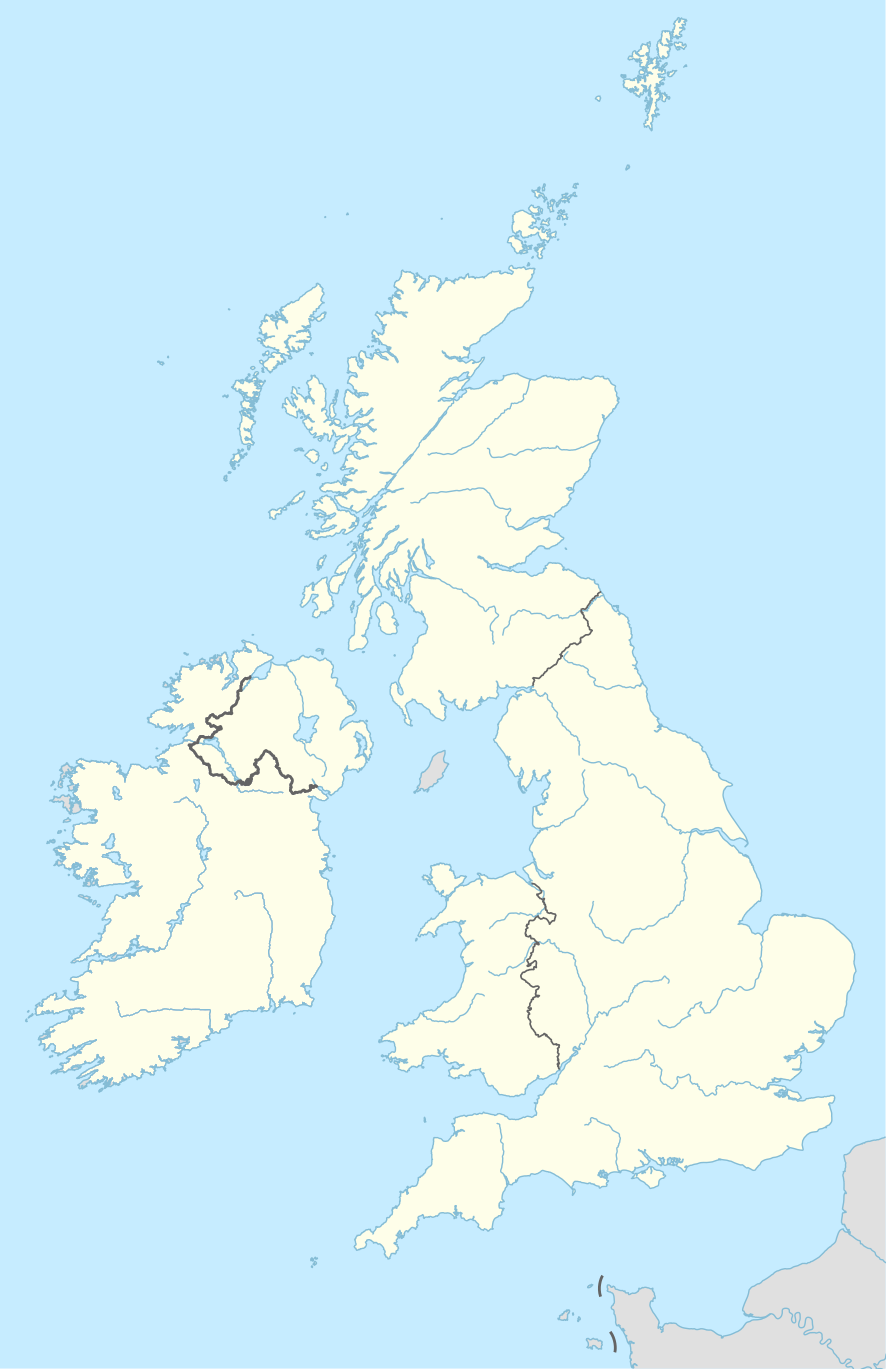
Locations of the 2016 Premier League venues in the British Isles
Locations of the 2016 Premier League venues in the Netherlands

(England) Leeds	(England) Newcastle upon Tyne	(Republic of Ireland) Dublin	(Scotland) Aberdeen
Leeds Arena; Thursday 4 February	Newcastle Arena; Thursday 11 February	3Arena; Thursday 18 February	AECC; Thursday 25 February
(England) Exeter	(England) Nottingham	(Scotland) Glasgow	(England) Liverpool
Westpoint Exeter; Thursday 3 March	Nottingham Arena; Thursday 10 March	SSE Hydro; Thursday 17 March	Liverpool Arena; Thursday 24 March
(Wales) Cardiff	(England) Sheffield	(Northern Ireland) Belfast	(England) Bournemouth
Cardiff International Arena; Thursday 31 March	Sheffield Arena; Thursday 7 April	SSE Arena Belfast; Thursday 14 April	Bournemouth International Centre; Thursday 21 April
(England) Birmingham	(England) Manchester	(Netherlands) Rotterdam	(England) London
Arena Birmingham; Thursday 28 April	Manchester Arena; Thursday 5 May	Rotterdam Ahoy; Thursday 12 May	The O_{2} Thursday 19 May

== Players ==
The players in this year's tournament were announced following the 2016 PDC World Darts Championship final on 3 January 2016, with the top four of the PDC Order of Merit joined by six Wildcards. The ten players made up the top ten in the PDC Order of Merit following the World Championship. Stephen Bunting (world number 16) and Kim Huybrechts (world number 14) did not return from last year. Robert Thornton returned after a year out, and Michael Smith made his début.

Player	Appearance in Premier League	Consecutive Streak	Order of Merit Rank	Previous best performance	Qualification
(Netherlands) Michael van Gerwen	4th	4	1	Winner (2013)	Order of Merit
(Scotland) Gary Anderson	6th	6	2	Winner (2011, 2015)	Order of Merit
(England) Adrian Lewis	9th	7	3	Runner-up (2011)	Order of Merit
(England) Phil Taylor	12th	12	4	Winner (2005–2008, 2010, 2012)	Order of Merit
(Scotland) Peter Wright	3rd	3	5	5th (2014)	PDC Wildcard
(England) James Wade	8th	2	6	Winner (2009)	PDC Wildcard
(Scotland) Robert Thornton	3rd	1	7	5th (2013)	PDC Wildcard
(England) Michael Smith	1st	1	8	Debut	PDC Wildcard
(Netherlands) Raymond van Barneveld	11th	11	9	Winner (2014)	Sky Sports Wildcard
(England) Dave Chisnall	3rd	3	10	Semi-finals (2015)	Sky Sports Wildcard

== Prize money ==
The 2016 Premier League saw the introduction of a £25,000 League Leader's Bonus for the player who topped the league table following the 15 league nights, taking the total prize fund for the event up to £725,000 from £700,000 in 2015.

Stage	Prize money
Winner	£200,000
Runner-up	£100,000
Semi-finalists (x2)	£75,000
5th place	£60,000
6th place	£50,000
7th place	£45,000
8th place	£40,000
9th place	£30,000
10th place	£25,000
League Winner Bonus	£25,000
Total	£725,000

== Results ==
=== League stage ===
==== 4 February – Week 1 (Phase 1) ====
(England) First Direct Arena, Leeds

	Score	
Peter Wright (Scotland); 99.16	7 – 2	(England) Michael Smith; 86.15
Michael van Gerwen (Netherlands); 98.30	4 – 7	(England) James Wade; 97.43
Phil Taylor (England); 92.34	2 – 7	(Netherlands) Raymond van Barneveld; 103.60
Robert Thornton (Scotland); 75.68	0 – 7	(England) Dave Chisnall; 101.16
Adrian Lewis (England); 100.03	7 – 1	(England) Michael Smith*; 80.97
Night's Average: 93.48
Highest Checkout: (Netherlands) Michael van Gerwen 167
Most 180s: (Scotland) Peter Wright & (England) James Wade 5
Night's 180s: 24

*Gary Anderson was originally scheduled to play against Adrian Lewis, but was sidelined with an illness, so Michael Smith played twice in Round 1. Anderson played Lewis on 17 March (Round 7), giving Smith the night off.

==== 11 February – Week 2 (Phase 1) ====
(England) Metro Radio Arena, Newcastle upon Tyne

	Score	
James Wade* (England); 93.00	7 – 4	(England) Michael Smith; 91.74
Raymond van Barneveld (Netherlands); 93.23	5 – 7	(Scotland) Peter Wright; 88.19
Adrian Lewis (England); 98.92	7 – 4	(England) Dave Chisnall; 98.80
Gary Anderson (Scotland); 106.23	3 – 7	(Netherlands) Michael van Gerwen; 111.88
James Wade (England); 101.85	1 – 7	(England) Phil Taylor; 111.20
Night's Average: 99.5
Highest Checkout: (England) Phil Taylor 127
Most 180s: (Netherlands) Michael van Gerwen 6
Night's 180s: 25

*Robert Thornton was originally scheduled to play against Michael Smith, but was sidelined with an illness, so James Wade played twice in Round 2. Thornton played Smith on 24 March (Round 8), giving Wade the night off.

==== 18 February – Week 3 (Phase 1) ====
(Republic of Ireland) 3Arena, Dublin

	Score	
Peter Wright (Scotland); 104.48	7 – 4	(England) James Wade; 98.96
Dave Chisnall (England); 96.88	6 – 6	(England) Michael Smith; 93.73
Phil Taylor (England); 100.83	7 – 4	(Scotland) Gary Anderson; 93.38
Michael van Gerwen (Netherlands); 106.40	7 – 4	(England) Adrian Lewis; 98.54
Robert Thornton (Scotland); 89.89	5 – 7	(Netherlands) Raymond van Barneveld; 102.60
Night's Average: 98.57
Highest Checkout: (Scotland) Peter Wright 161
Most 180s: (England) Dave Chisnall & (Netherlands) Michael van Gerwen 5
Night's 180s: 36

==== 25 February – Week 4 (Phase 1) ====
(Scotland) GE Oil & Gas Arena, Aberdeen

	Score	
Adrian Lewis (England); 99.55	7 – 5	(England) James Wade; 97.27
Gary Anderson (Scotland); 103.34	7 – 3	(Netherlands) Raymond van Barneveld; 98.89
Michael van Gerwen (Netherlands) _{WR} 123.40	7 – 1	(England) Michael Smith; 91.41
Phil Taylor (England); 115.25	7 – 5	(England) Dave Chisnall; 109.63
Peter Wright (Scotland); 98.45	6 – 6	(Scotland) Robert Thornton; 91.98
Night's Average: 102.92
Highest Checkout: (England) Adrian Lewis 142
Most 180s: (England) Phil Taylor 7
Night's 180s: 40

==== 3 March – Week 5 (Phase 1) ====
(England) Westpoint Arena, Exeter

	Score	
Phil Taylor (England); 104.00	7 – 1	(England) Adrian Lewis; 93.11
Dave Chisnall (England); 96.26	4 – 7	(England) James Wade; 102.25
Robert Thornton (Scotland); 85.80	4 – 7	(Scotland) Gary Anderson; 89.88
Peter Wright (Scotland); 108.98	2 – 7	(Netherlands) Michael van Gerwen; 116.67
Michael Smith (England); 95.77	7 – 5	(Netherlands) Raymond van Barneveld; 92.19
Night's Average: 98.49
Highest Checkout: (England) James Wade 161
Most 180s: (Scotland) Gary Anderson, (Netherlands) Michael van Gerwen & (England) Michael Smith 4
Night's 180s: 25

==== 10 March – Week 6 (Phase 1) ====
(England) Motorpoint Arena Nottingham, Nottingham

	Score	
Michael Smith (England); 95.54	3 – 7	(Scotland) Gary Anderson; 102.19
Peter Wright (Scotland); 106.79	3 – 7	(England) Adrian Lewis; 107.93
Raymond van Barneveld (Netherlands); 101.17	5 – 7	(England) James Wade; 100.50
Robert Thornton (Scotland); 88.38	0 – 7	(England) Phil Taylor; 102.15
Dave Chisnall (England); 93.03	2 – 7	(Netherlands) Michael van Gerwen; 113.47
Night's Average: 101.12
Highest Checkout: (Netherlands) Raymond van Barneveld 161
Most 180s: (England) Adrian Lewis & (England) Phil Taylor 5
Night's 180s: 31

==== 17 March – Week 7 (Phase 1) ====
(Scotland) SSE Hydro, Glasgow

	Score	
Gary Anderson (Scotland); 99.39	7 – 4	(England) Adrian Lewis; 93.00
James Wade (England); 100.81	7 – 4	(Scotland) Robert Thornton; 101.35
Michael van Gerwen (Netherlands); 107.35	6 – 6	(England) Phil Taylor; 103.12
Raymond van Barneveld (Netherlands); 104.90	7 – 4	(England) Dave Chisnall; 96.27
Gary Anderson (Scotland); 102.75	7 – 5	(Scotland) Peter Wright; 101.31
Night's Average: 100.99
Highest Checkout: (Netherlands) Michael van Gerwen 170
Most 180s: (England) Dave Chisnall 5
Night's 180s: 34

==== 24 March – Week 8 (Phase 1) ====
(England) Echo Arena Liverpool, Liverpool

	Score	
Michael Smith (England); 92.48	5 – 7	(Scotland) Robert Thornton; 92.88
Gary Anderson (Scotland); 103.25	7 – 4	(England) Dave Chisnall; 100.01
Adrian Lewis (England); 96.57	7 – 5	(Netherlands) Raymond van Barneveld; 98.35
Phil Taylor (England); 101.51	6 – 6	(Scotland) Peter Wright; 103.40
Michael van Gerwen (Netherlands); 97.57	6 – 6	(Scotland) Robert Thornton; 95.59
Night's Average: 98.16
Highest Checkout: (Scotland) Gary Anderson 144
Most 180s: (Scotland) Peter Wright 5
Night's 180s: 31

==== 31 March – Week 9 (Phase 1) ====
(Wales) Motorpoint Arena Cardiff, Cardiff

	Score	
James Wade (England); 95.18	6 – 6	(Scotland) Gary Anderson; 100.68
Michael Smith (England); 94.82	5 – 7	(England) Phil Taylor; 99.92
Dave Chisnall (England); 93.92	5 – 7	(Scotland) Peter Wright; 97.14
Robert Thornton (Scotland); 92.54	4 – 7	(England) Adrian Lewis; 96.82
Raymond van Barneveld (Netherlands); 101.69	6 – 6	(Netherlands) Michael van Gerwen; 105.59
Night's Average: 97.83
Highest Checkout: (England) Phil Taylor 124
Most 180s: (Scotland) Gary Anderson 5
Night's 180s: 34

==== 7 April – Week 10 (Phase 2) ====
(England) Motorpoint Arena, Sheffield

	Score	
James Wade (England); 97.25	7 – 4	(Netherlands) Raymond van Barneveld; 97.23
Gary Anderson (Scotland); 92.83	3 – 7	(England) Phil Taylor; 99.31
Robert Thornton (Scotland); 104.23	5 – 7	(Netherlands) Michael van Gerwen; 117.95
Adrian Lewis (England); 88.68	6 – 6	(Scotland) Peter Wright; 93.43
Phil Taylor (England); 92.91	7 – 4	(England) James Wade; 91.50
Night's Average: 97.53
Highest Checkout: (Netherlands) Michael van Gerwen 138
Most 180s: (Netherlands) Michael van Gerwen 6
Night's 180s: 30

==== 14 April – Week 11 (Phase 2) ====
(Northern Ireland) SSE Arena Belfast, Belfast

	Score	
Robert Thornton (Scotland); 105.63	7 – 2	(Scotland) Peter Wright; 92.48
Raymond van Barneveld (Netherlands); 96.14	5 – 7	(England) Phil Taylor; 100.36
James Wade (England); 95.95	5 – 7	(England) Adrian Lewis; 103.54
Michael van Gerwen (Netherlands); 110.55	6 – 6	(Scotland) Gary Anderson; 108.24
Raymond van Barneveld (Netherlands); 92.53	7 – 4	(Scotland) Robert Thornton; 88.16
Night's Average: 99.36
Highest Checkout: (England) Adrian Lewis 144
Most 180s: (Netherlands) Michael van Gerwen 6
Night's 180s: 29
Nine-dart finish: (England) Adrian Lewis

==== 21 April – Week 12 (Phase 2) ====
(England) Bournemouth International Centre, Bournemouth

	Score	
Michael van Gerwen (Netherlands); 103.38	7 – 2	(Scotland) Peter Wright; 98.30
Raymond van Barneveld (Netherlands); 93.09	7 – 4	(England) Adrian Lewis; 90.42
Gary Anderson (Scotland); 103.07	6 – 6	(England) James Wade; 99.71
Phil Taylor (England); 89.61	7 – 2	(Scotland) Robert Thornton; 93.61
Adrian Lewis (England); 92.98	5 – 7	(Netherlands) Michael van Gerwen; 96.82
Night's Average: 96.1
Highest Checkout: (England) Adrian Lewis 142
Most 180s: (Scotland) Gary Anderson 5
Night's 180s: 22

==== 28 April – Week 13 (Phase 2) ====
(England) Barclaycard Arena, Birmingham

	Score	
Peter Wright (Scotland); 99.67	7 – 4	(England) Phil Taylor; 106.48
Raymond van Barneveld (Netherlands); 99.64	5 – 7	(Scotland) Gary Anderson; 99.19
Adrian Lewis (England); 96.55	7 – 2	(Scotland) Robert Thornton; 94.55
James Wade (England); 102.40	1 – 7	(Netherlands) Michael van Gerwen; 108.33
Peter Wright (Scotland); 103.45	6 – 6	(Scotland) Gary Anderson; 101.51
Night's Average: 101.18
Highest Checkout: (Netherlands) Raymond van Barneveld 132
Most 180s: (Scotland) Peter Wright 7
Night's 180s: 22

==== 5 May – Week 14 (Phase 2) ====
(England) Manchester Arena, Manchester

	Score	
James Wade (England); 97.29	1 – 7	(Scotland) Peter Wright; 99.15
Gary Anderson (Scotland); 99.33	7 – 1	(Scotland) Robert Thornton; 90.40
Michael van Gerwen (Netherlands); 107.93	7 – 2	(Netherlands) Raymond van Barneveld; 100.78
Adrian Lewis (England); 94.11	2 – 7	(England) Phil Taylor; 103.72
Night's Average: 99.09
Highest Checkout: (Netherlands) Michael van Gerwen 167
Most 180s: (Scotland) Peter Wright 6
Night's 180s: 20

==== 12 May – Week 15 (Phase 2) ====
(Netherlands) Rotterdam Ahoy, Rotterdam

	Score	
Robert Thornton (Scotland); 85.57	3 – 7	(England) James Wade; 89.16
Peter Wright (Scotland); 90.33	6 – 6	(Netherlands) Raymond van Barneveld; 90.02
Adrian Lewis (England); 93.22	7 – 2	(Scotland) Gary Anderson; 97.21
Phil Taylor (England); 95.55	5 – 7	(Netherlands) Michael van Gerwen; 101.24
Night's Average: 92.79
Highest Checkout: (Netherlands) Michael van Gerwen 164
Most 180s : (Netherlands) Michael van Gerwen 4
Night's 180s: 14

=== Play-offs – 19 May ===
(England) The O_{2} Arena, London

	Score	
Semi-finals (best of 19 legs)
Michael van Gerwen (Netherlands); 103.19	10 – 4	(England) Adrian Lewis; 95.47
Phil Taylor (England); 98.21	10 – 7	(Scotland) Gary Anderson; 96.86
Final (best of 21 legs)
Michael van Gerwen (Netherlands); 104.68	11 – 3	(England) Phil Taylor; 98.84
Night's Average: 99.54
Highest Checkout: (Netherlands) Michael van Gerwen 121

== League summary ==
=== Table ===
After the first nine weeks (phase 1), the bottom two in the table are eliminated. Each remaining player plays a further seven matches (phase 2). The top four players then compete in the playoffs.

When players are tied on points, leg difference is used first as a tie-breaker, after that legs won against throw and then tournament average.

#	Name	Pld	W	D	L	Pts	LF	LA	+/-	LWAT	100+	140+	180s	A	HC	C%
1	(Netherlands) Michael van Gerwen W	16	11	4	1	26	105	63	+42	39	187	144	62	107.93	170	49.30%
2	(England) Phil Taylor RU	16	11	2	3	24	100	65	+35	36	228	138	52	101.15	141	46.51%
3	(Scotland) Gary Anderson	16	8	4	4	20	92	81	+11	30	222	134	48	100.15	144	40.35%
4	(England) Adrian Lewis	16	9	1	6	19	89	79	+10	32	223	109	38	96.50	144	40.09%
5	(Scotland) Peter Wright	16	6	5	5	17	86	86	0	27	239	142	52	99.04	161	40.00%
6	(England) James Wade	16	7	2	7	16	82	89	−7	27	256	143	35	97.53	161	42.71%
7	(Netherlands) Raymond van Barneveld	16	5	2	9	12	86	94	−8	25	244	169	44	97.88	161	38.05%
8	(Scotland) Robert Thornton	16	2	2	12	6	60	103	−43	10	220	100	33	92.26	145	35.93%
9	(England) Dave Chisnall	9	1	1	7	3	41	55	−14	17	101	67	37	98.44	116	35.96%
10	(England) Michael Smith	9	1	1	7	3	34	60	−26	14	103	42	24	91.40	122	37.36%

Last updated: 12 May 2016
Source: Match reports from the results section.

Top four qualified for the Play-offs after Week 15.
NB: LWAT = Legs Won Against Throw. A = Average C% = Checkout Percentage HC = High Checkout.

=== Positions by round ===
Player	Round														
Player	1	2	3	4	5	6	7	8	9	10	11	12	13	14	15
(Netherlands) Michael van Gerwen	6	6	4	2	1	1	1	1	2	2	2	2	1	1	1
(England) Phil Taylor	7	7	5	4	2	2	2	2	1	1	1	1	2	2	2
(Scotland) Gary Anderson	7	8	9	8	6	6	3	3	3	4	4	3	3	3	3
(England) Adrian Lewis	2	1	2	3	4	3	5	4	4	3	3	4	4	4	4
(Scotland) Peter Wright	3	2	1	1	3	5	6	6	6	6	6	7	6	5	5
(England) James Wade	5	3	6	6	5	4	4	5	5	5	5	5	5	6	6
(Netherlands) Raymond van Barneveld	3	5	3	5	7	7	7	7	7	7	7	6	7	7	7
(Scotland) Robert Thornton	10	10	10	9	10	10	10	8	8	8	8	8	8	8	8
(England) Dave Chisnall	1	4	7	7	8	8	8	9	9	Eliminated					
(England) Michael Smith	9	9	8	10	9	9	9	10	10	Eliminated					
