= 2026 PDC World Cup of Darts =

Darts tournament

2026 BetVictor World Cup of Darts

Tournament information
- Dates: 11–14 June 2026
- Venue: Eissporthalle
- Location: Frankfurt, Germany
- Organisation(s): Professional Darts Corporation (PDC)
- Format: Doubles event Legs
- Prize fund: £500,000
- Winner's share: £100,000
- High checkout: 170; Phuay Wei Tan (SIN); Luke Littler (ENG)

Champion(s)
- England (Luke Littler and Luke Humphries)

The 2026 PDC World Cup of Darts (known for sponsorship reasons as the 2026 BetVictor World Cup of Darts) was a professional darts tournament that took place from 11 to 14 June 2026 at the Eissporthalle in Frankfurt, Germany. It was the 16th edition of the PDC World Cup of Darts to be staged by the Professional Darts Corporation (PDC). The total prize fund was £500,000, of which the winning team shared £100,000.

The tournament featured 40 pairs of national teams. The top four nations based on lowest cumulative placement in the PDC World Rankings entered the tournament in the second round, with the remaining 36 teams starting in the group stage. Trinidad and Tobago and Mongolia made their World Cup debuts, while Slovenia participated in the event for the first time since the inaugural edition in 2010. Uganda were also set to make their debut, but the team withdrew due to visa issues and were replaced by Gibraltar. Simon Whitlock, who won the 2022 edition alongside Damon Heta, missed the event for the first time after representing Australia at each previous edition.

Northern Ireland's Josh Rock and Daryl Gurney were the defending champions, having defeated Wales 10–9 in the 2025 final. However, they lost 8–2 to the Netherlands in the semi-finals. England, represented by Luke Littler and Luke Humphries, won a record-extending sixth World Cup title by defeating the Netherlands 10–5 in the final.

== Overview ==
=== Background ===
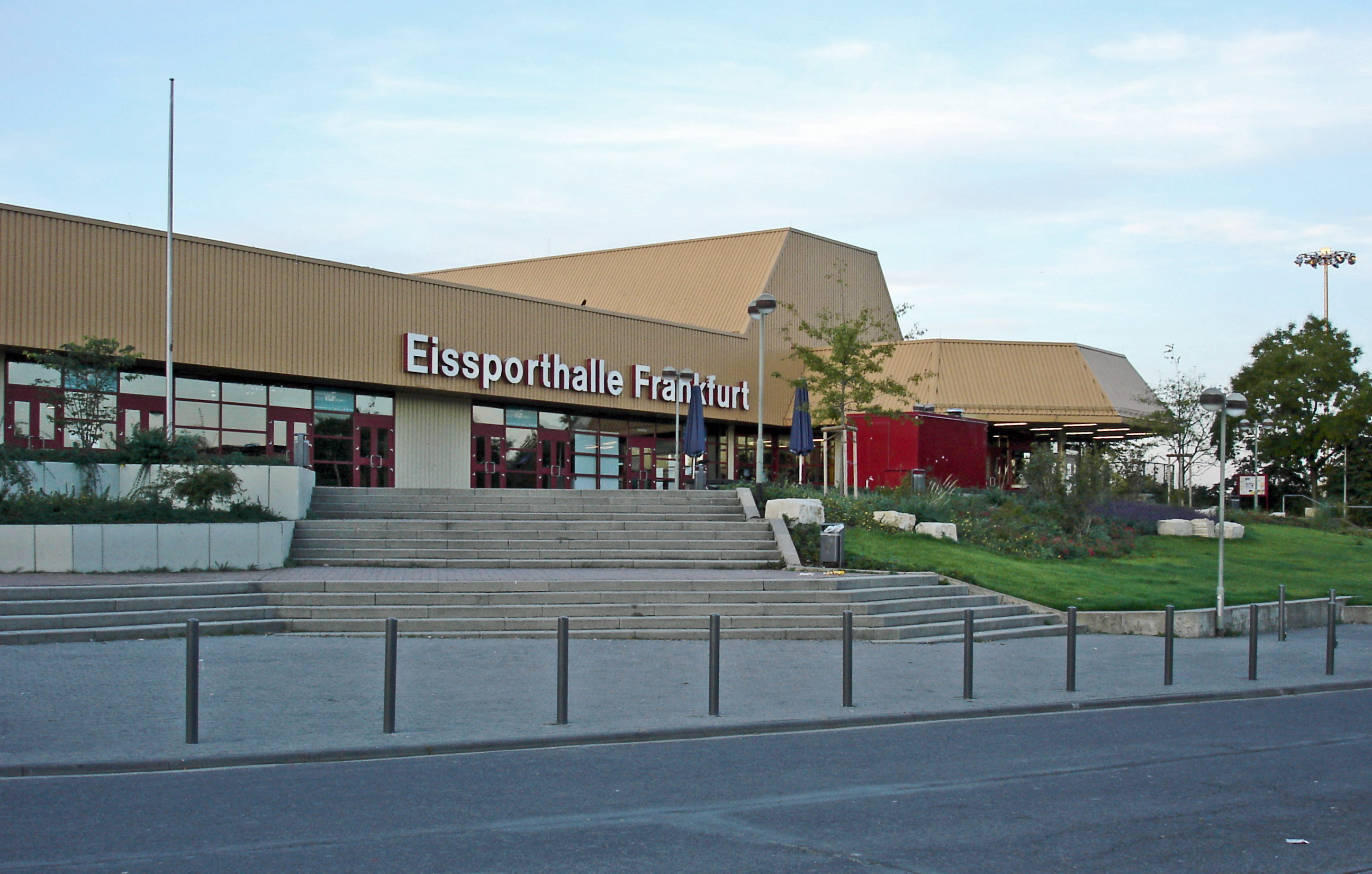
The tournament was held at the Eissporthalle in Frankfurt, Germany.

The 2026 PDC World Cup of Darts was the 16th edition of the tournament to be staged by the Professional Darts Corporation (PDC) since the inaugural edition in 2010. It was introduced as part of PDC chairman Barry Hearn's plans to expand professional darts, which he initiated after his offer to acquire the British Darts Organisation was rejected. The first edition was held at the Rainton Meadows Arena in Houghton-le-Spring, England, and was won by Raymond van Barneveld and Co Stompé of the Netherlands. The tournament has since been held in Germany, with the exception of the 2020 edition held in Austria.

The 2026 edition was held from 11 to 14 June 2026 at the Eissporthalle in Frankfurt. Gibraltar-based online gambling company BetVictor continued its sponsorship of the event after becoming title sponsor in 2024. Northern Ireland entered the tournament as defending champions after Josh Rock and Daryl Gurney defeated Jonny Clayton and Gerwyn Price of Wales 10–9 in the 2025 final to claim the nation's first World Cup. Top seeds England, represented by world number one Luke Littler and world number two Luke Humphries, were seen as the favourites to win the title, despite suffering an upset loss to Germany in their opening match the previous year.

=== Format ===
The 40-team format that was introduced in 2023 remained. The top four seeded teams received a bye to the second round, while the remaining 36 teams competed in the group stage. The group stage consisted of twelve groups of three teams, with one qualifying from each group.

In this format, all rounds featured doubles matches where teams alternated between players for each turn. All matches were in leg play format, with the number of legs required to win increasing as the tournament progressed:

- Group stage: Best of seven legs
- Second round, quarter and semi-finals: Best of fifteen legs
- Final: Best of nineteen legs

=== Prize money ===
The total prize fund for the event increased from £450,000 in 2025 to £500,000 in 2026. The winning team shared the top prize of £100,000. The prize money per team was:

Position (no. of teams)		Prize money (Total: £500,000)
Winners	(1)	£100,000
Runners-up	(1)	£48,000
Semi-finalists	(2)	£30,000
Quarter-finalists	(4)	£20,000
Last 16 (Second round)	(8)	£10,000
Second in group	(12)	£6,000
Third in group	(12)	£5,000

=== Broadcasts ===
The tournament was broadcast on Sky Sports in the United Kingdom and Ireland. Other broadcasters included DAZN in Germany, Austria and Switzerland; Fox Sports in Australia; Sky Sport in New Zealand; Viaplay in the Netherlands, Scandinavia and Iceland; VTM in Belgium; FanDuel TV and Peacock in the United States; Nova in the Czech Republic and Slovakia; AMC Network in Hungary; Arena Sport in Serbia, Bosnia and Herzegovina, Montenegro, North Macedonia and Kosovo; Zonasport in Croatia; TV3 in the Baltic states; Setanta in Ukraine; beIN Sports in the Middle East and North Africa; Canal+ in Poland; and Canal+ in South Africa. It was also available for subscribers outside of the United Kingdom, Germany, Austria, and Switzerland on the PDC's streaming service, PDCTV.

== Teams and seedings ==
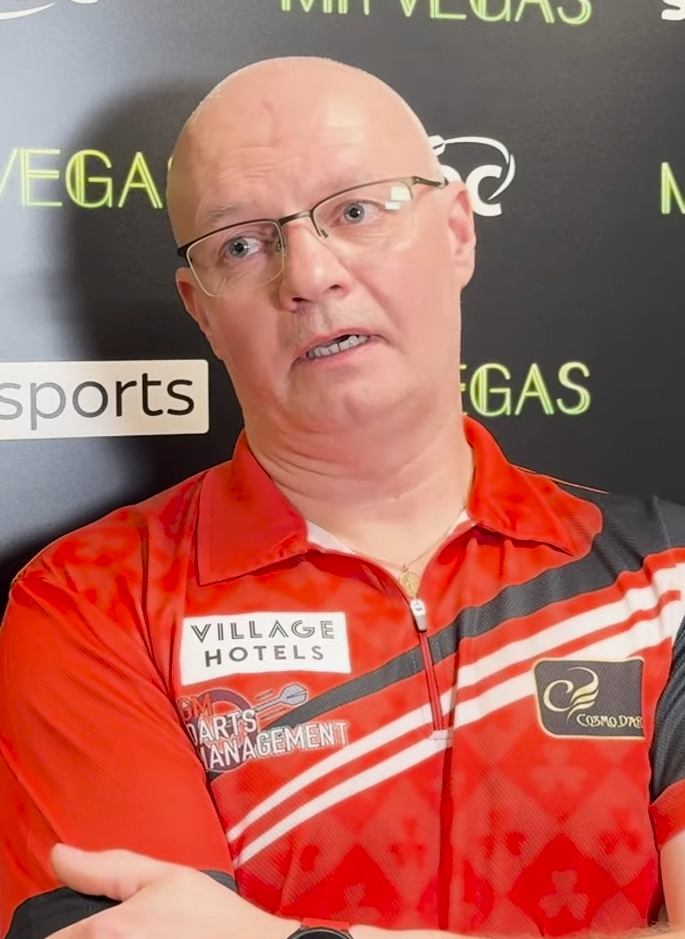
Mickey Mansell (pictured in 2024) switched from Northern Ireland to the Republic of Ireland, becoming the first player in the tournament's history to represent two different nations.

The tournament consisted of 40 pairs of national teams. The first 33 nations were confirmed on 6 February 2026, with a further seven teams being determined through various qualifiers: three from a PDC Asian Tour qualifier, two from the PDC Nordic and Baltic rankings, one from a Championship Darts Latin America and Caribbean Tour qualifier, and one from an African Darts Group qualifier.

Two nations made their World Cup of Darts debuts. Trinidad and Tobago, represented by Joshua Balfour and James Walklin, made their first appearance after winning the Championship Darts Latin America and Caribbean Tour qualifier. The second new nation, Mongolia, represented by Ganzorig Lkhagvasüren and Altantülkhüür Myagmarsüren, achieved their place at the tournament alongside Singapore and Thailand through the PDC Asian Tour qualifier. Uganda, represented by Patrick Ocheng and Juma Said, originally secured their debut by winning the newly-introduced North African qualifier. However, on 10 June 2026, the PDC announced that the Ugandan team, as well as runners-up Malawi, were unable to enter Germany due to visa issues. The remaining place in the tournament was awarded to Gibraltar, represented by Craig Galliano and Justin Hewitt.

Nick Kenny made his first appearance for Wales as a replacement for Gerwyn Price, who made himself unavailable for selection. Mickey Mansell became the first player to play for two different nations at the World Cup of Darts, switching to the Republic of Ireland after previously representing Northern Ireland on four occasions from 2012 to 2015. As a result of Benjamin Pratnemer earning a PDC Tour Card at 2026 Q-School, Slovenia participated in the event for the first time since the inaugural edition in 2010. Fellow tour newcomer Adam Leek partnered Damon Heta for Australia, marking the first time 2022 champion Simon Whitlock had missed the event since its inception. William O'Connor and Mensur Suljović remained as the only ever-present players in the tournament's history.

The top four nations based on lowest cumulative placement in the PDC World Rankings entered the tournament in the second round as seeds, while the next twelve nations were seeded in the group stage. The full list of pairings was confirmed on 11 May following the culmination of the Austrian Darts Open.

Seeded nations (Top 4 into second round)

Rank	Country	Entered players	Start in
1	England	Luke Littler and Luke Humphries	Round 2
2	Netherlands	Gian van Veen and Michael van Gerwen	Round 2
3	Northern Ireland	Josh Rock and Daryl Gurney	Round 2
4	Scotland	Gary Anderson and Cameron Menzies	Round 2
5	Germany	Martin Schindler and Ricardo Pietreczko	Round 1
6	Belgium	Mike De Decker and Dimitri Van den Bergh	Round 1
7	Wales	Jonny Clayton and Nick Kenny	Round 1
8	Ireland	William O'Connor and Mickey Mansell	Round 1
9	Poland	Krzysztof Ratajski and Sebastian Białecki	Round 1
10	Sweden	Jeffrey de Graaf and Oskar Lukasiak	Round 1
11	Australia	Damon Heta and Adam Leek	Round 1
12	Czech Republic	Karel Sedláček and Adam Gawlas	Round 1
13	Austria	Mensur Suljović and Rusty-Jake Rodriguez	Round 1
14	Latvia	Madars Razma and Valters Melderis	Round 1
15	Croatia	Boris Krčmar and Pero Ljubić	Round 1
16	Finland	Jani Haavisto and Jonas Masalin	Round 1

Unseeded nations

Country	Entered players
Canada	Jim Long and David Cameron
China	Qingyu Zhan and Xiaochen Zong
Denmark	Andreas Toft Jørgensen and Jonas Graversen
France	Thibault Tricole and Nicolas Thuillier
Gibraltar	Craig Galliano and Justin Hewitt
Hong Kong	Man Lok Leung and Lok Yin Lee
Hungary	Patrik Kovács and Pál Székely
India	Nitin Kumar and Ankit Goenka
Italy	Michele Turetta and Riccardo Castelli
Japan	Motomu Sakai and Haruki Muramatsu
Lithuania	Darius Labanauskas and Mindaugas Barauskas
Mongolia	Altantülkhüür Myagmarsüren and Ganzorig Lkhagvasüren
New Zealand	Jonny Tata and Ben Robb
Norway	Cor Dekker and Kent Jøran Sivertsen
Philippines	Alexis Toylo and Paolo Nebrida
Portugal	Luis Camacho and José de Sousa
Singapore	Paul Lim and Phuay Wei Tan
Slovenia	Benjamin Pratnemer and Stefano Božiček
South Africa	Graham Filby and Devon Petersen
Spain	Cristo Reyes and José Justicia
Switzerland	Stefan Bellmont and Marcel Walpen
Thailand	Sarayut Ouamuapa and Sorawis Rodman
Trinidad and Tobago	Joshua Balfour and James Walklin
United States	Adam Sevada and Stowe Buntz

== Summary ==
=== Groups ===
The group stage was held over three sessions, the first taking place on 11 June with the second and third taking place on 12 June. In each of the three sessions, one match was played from each group. The loser of the first match played the remaining team in the second match, while the winner of the first match played the remaining team in the third match, ensuring there were no dead rubbers. In each session, the matches were played in the following group order: H, K, L, D, E, F, J, B, A, C, I, G.

==== Groups A–F ====
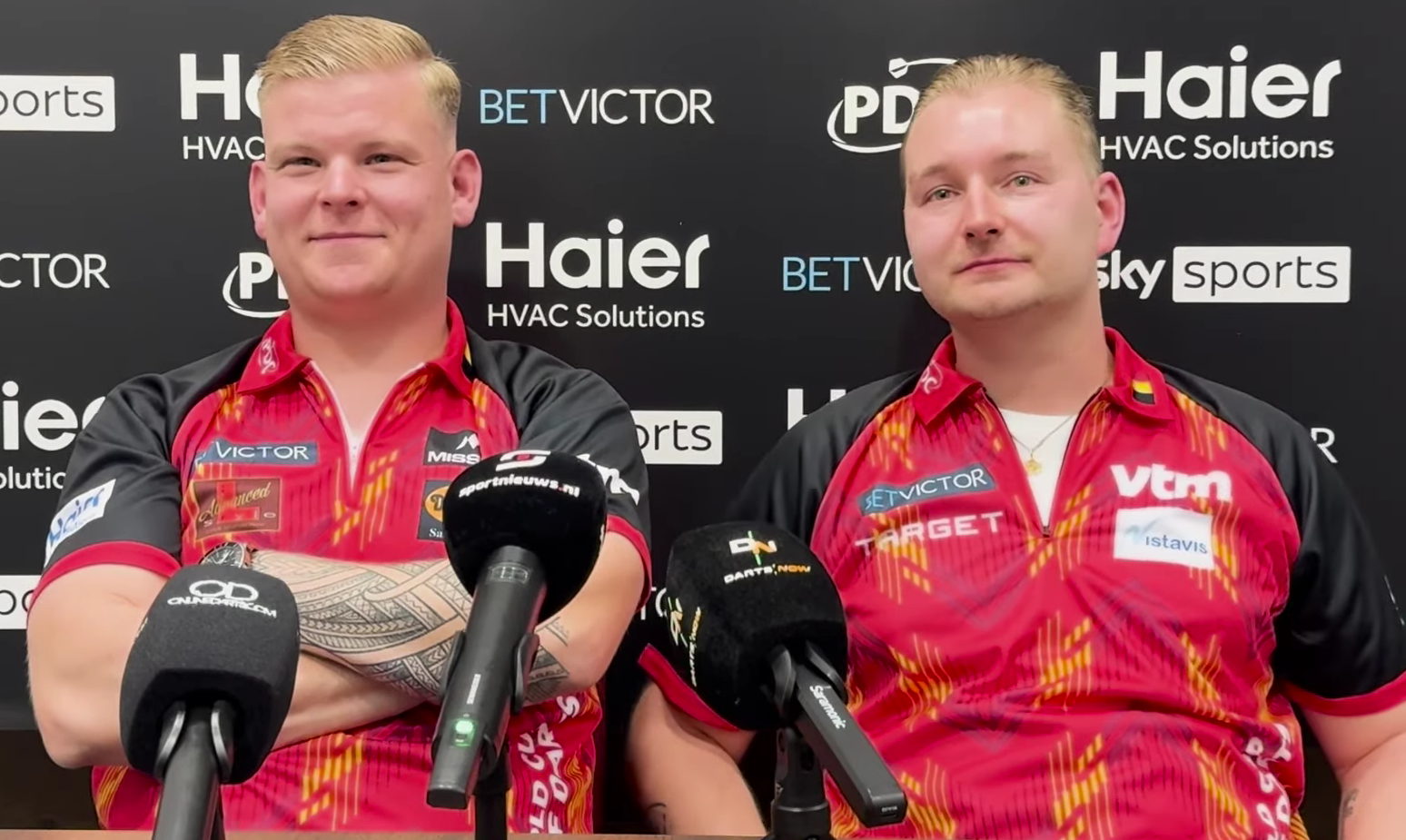
Despite losing their opening match to Hong Kong, Belgium's Mike De Decker and Dimitri Van den Bergh (pictured at the event in 2025) won Group B based on leg difference after defeating Slovenia 4–1.

Group A featured host nation and fifth seeds Germany, the Philippines, and New Zealand. In the group's opening match, Germany achieved a three-dart average of 101.90, the highest for a German team in the tournament's history, as they whitewashed the Philippines 4–0. Germany's Martin Schindler recorded an individual average of 120.69. The Philippines required a 4–0 victory against New Zealand to avoid elimination, but were only able to win 4–1 despite averaging over 98. Schindler and Ricardo Pietreczko claimed the single leg they needed against New Zealand to ensure qualification, eventually securing a 4–2 win.

Group B featured 2013 finalists and sixth seeds Belgium, Hong Kong, and Slovenia. Hong Kong established a 3–0 lead against Belgium and although the Belgians threatened a comeback, Hong Kong later sealed a 4–2 win to upset the seeded team. Belgium's performance against Hong Kong saw a discrepancy in individual averages, as Mike De Decker averaged 106 compared to his teammate Dimitri Van den Bergh's 65. Belgium rebounded from their opening defeat, winning four consecutive legs to beat Slovenia 4–1. Hong Kong needed to win three legs against Slovenia to progress to the knockout stage, but the pair missed a total of six qualification darts as they lost 4–2, resulting in Belgium advancing based on leg difference.

Group C featured two-time champions and seventh seeds Wales, Lithuania, and Thailand. The new Welsh pair of Jonny Clayton and debutant Nick Kenny were 4–1 victors over Lithuania in the group's opener, winning four consecutive legs after going 1–0 behind. Clayton followed a 146 checkout with a 100 checkout using two double 20s to secure the win. "It was mint, and to do it with Jonny [Clayton] was even better," said Kenny about his debut. Thailand were beaten twice the following day, losing to Lithuania before a 4–1 defeat to Wales saw Clayton and Kenny qualify for the knockout stage.

Group D featured 2019 finalists and eighth seeds Ireland, Singapore, and Gibraltar. Singapore's Phuay Wei Tan opened their match with Ireland by winning the first leg with a 170 checkout, but Ireland claimed the next four legs to win 4–1. In a post-match interview, Ireland's William O'Connor criticised the seeding system of the tournament, joking that "two guys out of the pub" could win due to the group stage's short format, before stating that teams entering at the second-round stage was "absolutely rubbish" and that he wished they entered at the same time as everyone else. Gibraltar, who arrived in Frankfurt the evening before the tournament started as a replacement for Uganda, were beaten 4–2 by Singapore. Ireland secured qualification by taking a 2–1 lead against Gibraltar, and although Gibraltar's Craig Galliano landed a 158 checkout to level the match, O'Connor and Mickey Mansell won the next two legs to prevail 4–2.

Group E featured ninth seeds Poland, Portugal, and Switzerland. Poland, considered a dark horse to win the tournament, opened their campaign with a 4–1 win over Portugal. Switzerland inflicted a second defeat on Portugal in their opening match the following day, but were beaten 4–2 by Poland as Krzysztof Ratajski and Sebastian Białecki advanced to the last 16.

Group F featured tenth seeds Sweden, South Africa, and debutants Mongolia. Sweden won the group's opener against South Africa, coming through a match with poor doubling from both teams to claim a 4–2 victory. Mongolia claimed their first ever leg before succumbing to a 4–1 defeat to South Africa. The Mongolians took a 1–0 lead against Sweden but suffered their second 4–1 loss as Jeffrey de Graaf and Oskar Lukasiak secured the top spot in Group F.

==== Groups G–L ====
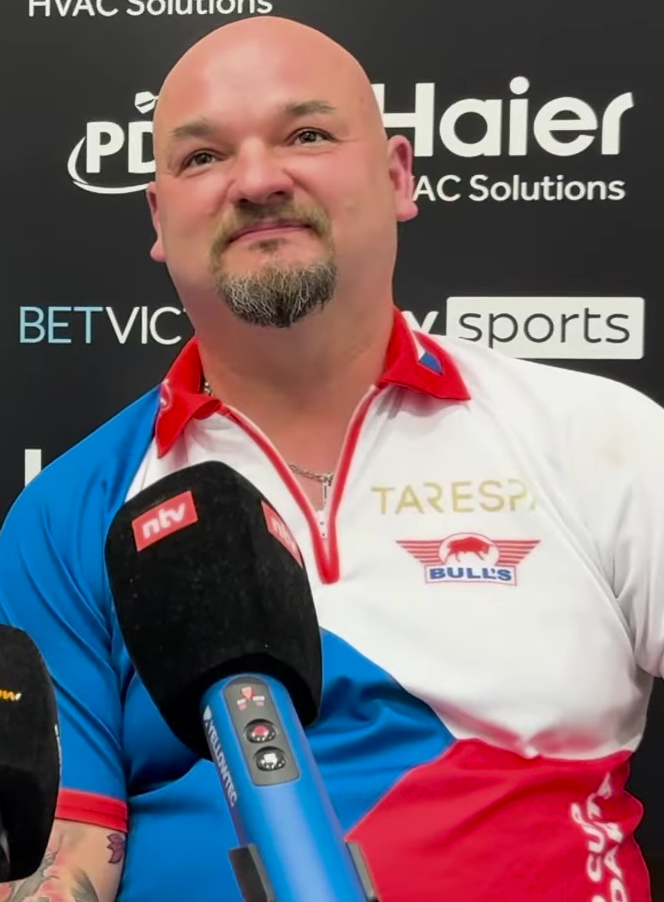
Karel Sedláček (pictured at the event in 2025) and Adam Gawlas of the Czech Republic conceded only one leg on their way to winning Group H.

Group G featured 2022 champions and eleventh seeds Australia, the United States, and Canada. The group was called the "group of death" by pundit and three-time world champion John Part. The seeded team were unsuccessful in their opening match as Australia lost in a deciding leg to the United States. Australia's elimination was confirmed following a 4–1 loss to Canada. In a North American derby, Adam Sevada and Stowe Buntz of the United States won their decisive match against Canada 4–2 to advance.

Group H featured twelfth seeds the Czech Republic, India, and Denmark. Adam Gawlas averaged over 115 and hit three maximums to lead the Czech Republic to a whitewash victory over India in their opening match. Denmark defeated India 4–1 but lost their second match 4–1 to Gawlas and Karel Sedláček, who only dropped one leg on their way to winning Group H.

Group I featured two-time finalists and thirteenth seeds Austria, China, and France. Austria posted an average of 97.38 as they won 4–1 against China. After claiming a deciding-leg victory over China, Thibault Tricole and Nicolas Thuillier of France made it through by overturning a 3–0 deficit to earn a 4–3 comeback win against Austria, who missed four match darts.

Group J featured fourteenth seeds Latvia, Italy, and debutants Trinidad and Tobago. Latvia trailed Italy 2–1 in the group's opening match but won the next three legs to secure a 4–2 victory. Despite losing their opening match to Italy, Trinidad and Tobago claimed a 4–3 upset victory over Latvia, although the Latvian pair of Madars Razma and Valters Melderis advanced to the knockout stage by winning the three legs they required.

Group K featured fifteenth seeds Croatia, Japan, and Spain. Croatia led Japan 2–0 but were eventually brought to a deciding leg after missing three match darts, which allowed Haruki Muramatsu to convert an 81 checkout on the bullseye to prolong the contest. His teammate Motomu Sakai then hit double 12 in the decider to complete a 4–3 victory for Japan. Croatia suffered another deciding-leg loss to Spain. In the group's final match, Spain's Cristo Reyes hit a 135 checkout on the bullseye before he and José Justicia completed a 4–1 win against Japan to qualify for the next round.

Group L featured sixteenth seeds Finland, Norway, and Hungary. Norway went 2–0 ahead against Finland, but the Finnish duo were able to take the match to a deciding leg, where Norway prevailed 4–3. Hungary whitewashed Finland to set up a deciding match, where Cor Dekker and Kent Jøran Sivertsen won 4–3 to top the group and ensure that Norway would feature in the knockout stage of a World Cup for the first time in a decade.

=== Second round ===
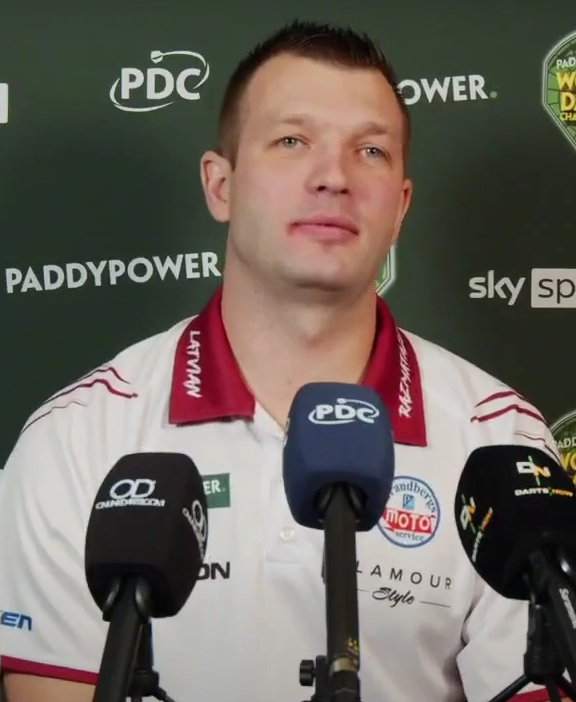
Madars Razma (pictured in 2024) guided Latvia to the nation's first World Cup of Darts quarter-final alongside teammate Valters Melderis.

The knockout stage began with the second round on 13 June. Five-time champions and top seeds England started their opening match by taking a 3–0 lead against Spain, but a three-leg run saw Spain level the score. The teams traded legs until Luke Littler found a break of throw to put England 6–4 ahead. He would later seal victory for himself and Luke Humphries, converting an 89 checkout on double 5 to win 8–5 and secure their first victory as a duo. Spain's Cristo Reyes finished the match with the highest individual three-dart average of the four players, averaging 102.48. Humphries rated England's performance "about six out of 10" after the pair missed 20 of their 28 attempts at double, with Littler adding that they were glad to have a test in their opener instead of winning comfortably. Defending champions and third seeds Northern Ireland initially trailed Belgium 5–2, but the team of Josh Rock and Daryl Gurney closed the contest by winning six of the last eight legs, claiming an 8–7 victory when Gurney hit a 102 checkout in the decider. "At no stage did we think we were beaten," declared Gurney afterwards. "That tells you we're champions. We're here to win, we're trying to go back-to-back, but now this game is over, we start afresh tomorrow". Sweden trailed the three-time champions and second seeds the Netherlands 3–0, but a 155 checkout from Oskar Lukasiak saw him and Jeffrey de Graaf go 4–3 in front. In a close encounter, Gian van Veen and Michael van Gerwen of the Netherlands sealed an 8–6 win, the latter converting a 70 checkout to finish the match.

Two-time champions and third seeds Scotland opened their tournament by beating Norway 8–0, the third whitewash win in the knockout stage of a World Cup since it became a separate phase in 2023. "I would say that was one of the easiest games of darts I've played," commented Cameron Menzies while praising his teammate Gary Anderson's performance. Germany established a 6–1 lead against the Czech Republic, but the Czechs threatened a comeback as they reduced their deficit to 7–6. In the end, Germany were able to hold off their opponents by completing an 8–6 victory with an 11-dart leg, spearheaded by a maximum from Martin Schindler. Wales led the United States 5–2 before the American duo shortened the gap to 6–5. Wales won the next two legs to prevail 8–5 in a match that featured two 141 checkouts from Jonny Clayton. The Latvian team created history for the nation, progressing to their first World Cup quarter-final by defeating France in a deciding leg. Poland won three consecutive legs to level at 5–5 against Ireland, but the Irish pair then won three legs of their own to triumph 8–5 and advance. "We're into the next round and I'll tell you one thing, you'll never know how far we can go," remarked William O'Connor, who posted an individual average of 102.57.

=== Quarter-finals and semi-finals ===
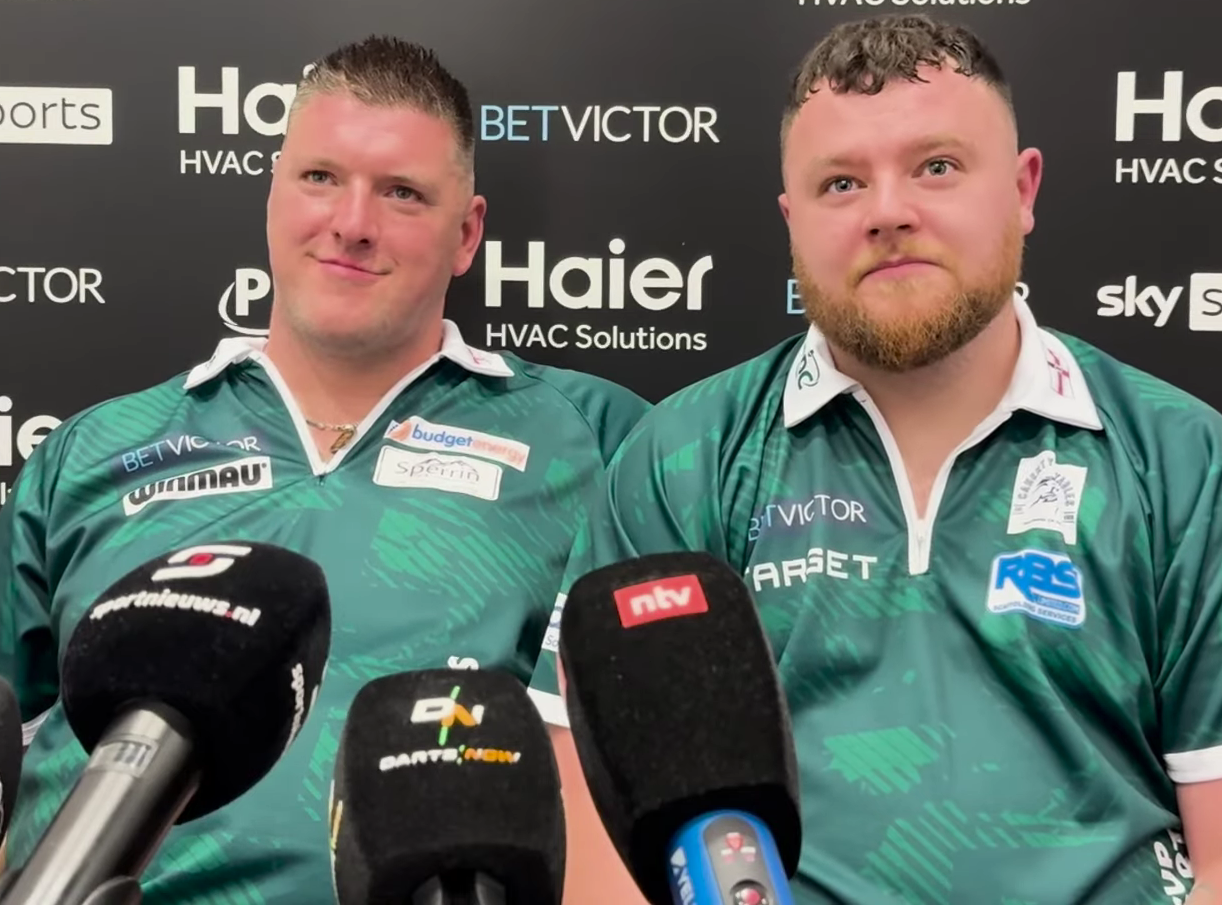
Defending champions Northern Ireland, represented by Daryl Gurney and Josh Rock (pictured at the event in 2025), advanced to the semi-finals by winning a deciding leg against Latvia, before being eliminated by the Netherlands.

The quarter-finals were played in the afternoon session on 14 June. Scotland opened their quarter-final with Ireland by going 3–0 ahead, and entered the interval with a 5–2 lead. Although the Irish duo were able to reduce the deficit to one leg during the contest, Cameron Menzies won the final two legs for Scotland as he and Gary Anderson progressed to the semi-finals with an 8–5 victory. In the second quarter-final, Wales raced into a 4–0 lead against England, mirroring Scotland's start by entering the interval 5–2 in front. Wales then missed darts to take a commanding 6–2 lead, allowing the English pair to come back and level at 5–5. Luke Littler put England ahead for the first time in the next leg, before hitting a 170 checkout in the 13th leg for a hold of throw, denying Jonny Clayton the chance at a 66 checkout to give Wales the lead. The match went to a deciding leg, where Nick Kenny was unable to get a match dart on an 84 finish before Littler completed an 8–7 victory for England on double 2. Latvia started well against Northern Ireland, establishing a 4–1 lead against the defending champions. Northern Ireland hit checkouts of 161 and 133 as they went 7–5 ahead, but the pair missed two match darts as Latvia took the contest to a decider. Madars Razma awaited a 24 finish in his next turn to win the match for the Latvians, but Josh Rock converted a 144 checkout on double 12 to claim a dramatic 8–7 win for Northern Ireland. In the last quarter-final, Germany went 3–2 in front against the Netherlands, but the Dutch duo conceded only one leg for the remainder of the match as they claimed an 8–4 win, averaging 102.68 in the process.

The semi-finals were played in the evening session on 14 June, where top seeds England faced fourth seeds Scotland, and second seeds the Netherlands faced third seeds Northern Ireland. In the first semi-final, England led Scotland 5–2 heading into the interval, aided by a break of throw in the fourth leg. Scotland only registered one more leg as England advanced to the final by winning 8–3, with Littler and Humphries averaging 101.59 to achieve their first ton-plus average as a partnership. The Netherlands ended the title defence of Northern Ireland in the second semi-final, winning the first four legs of the match before eventually triumphing 8–2; Van Veen and Van Gerwen recorded their second consecutive ton-plus average on their way to winning.

=== Final ===
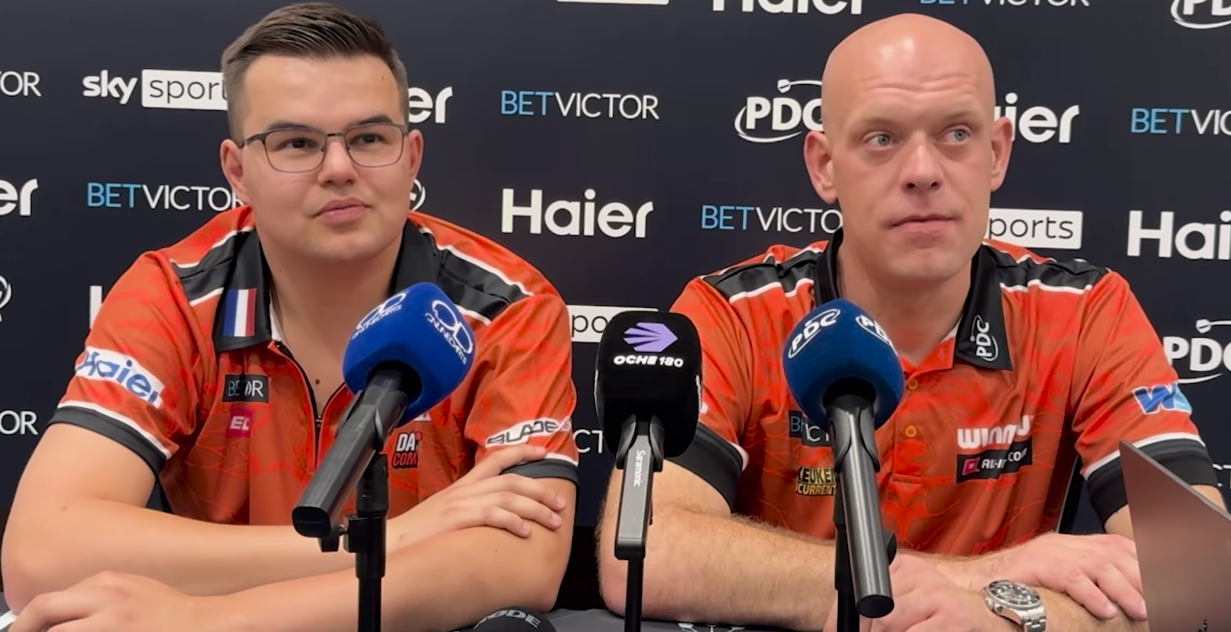
The Netherlands, represented by Gian van Veen and Michael van Gerwen (pictured at the event), reached the final for the first time since the 2018 edition.

The final between first seeds England and second seeds the Netherlands was played in the evening session on 14 June. The Netherlands contested their first final since 2018. It was the first time that the top two seeded nations had contested the final since the 2020 edition, where Wales defeated England. The 2026 final also featured the top four players in the PDC World Rankings: world number one Luke Littler, world number two Luke Humphries, world number three Gian van Veen, and world number four Michael van Gerwen. The teams entered the tournament as the two most successful nations in the competition's history, England leading on five title wins ahead of the Netherlands' four.

Van Gerwen gave the Dutch team a 2–1 lead through a 113 checkout, but England entered the first interval 3–2 ahead after Littler found the match's first break of throw. Humphries converted an 87 finish to break again and establish a three-leg lead at 5–2. England went into the second interval with a 7–3 advantage. As England led 8–5 in the 14th leg, Van Gerwen bust his score by hitting double 13 instead of double 4, allowing Humphries to capitalise and put England one leg away from victory. The English duo then secured the 10–5 win in the next leg when Humphries completed a 12-darter by pinning double 8. England hit a combined 15 maximums and finished the match with a three-dart average of 104.77, the highest of the tournament and the highest pairs average in a World Cup final.

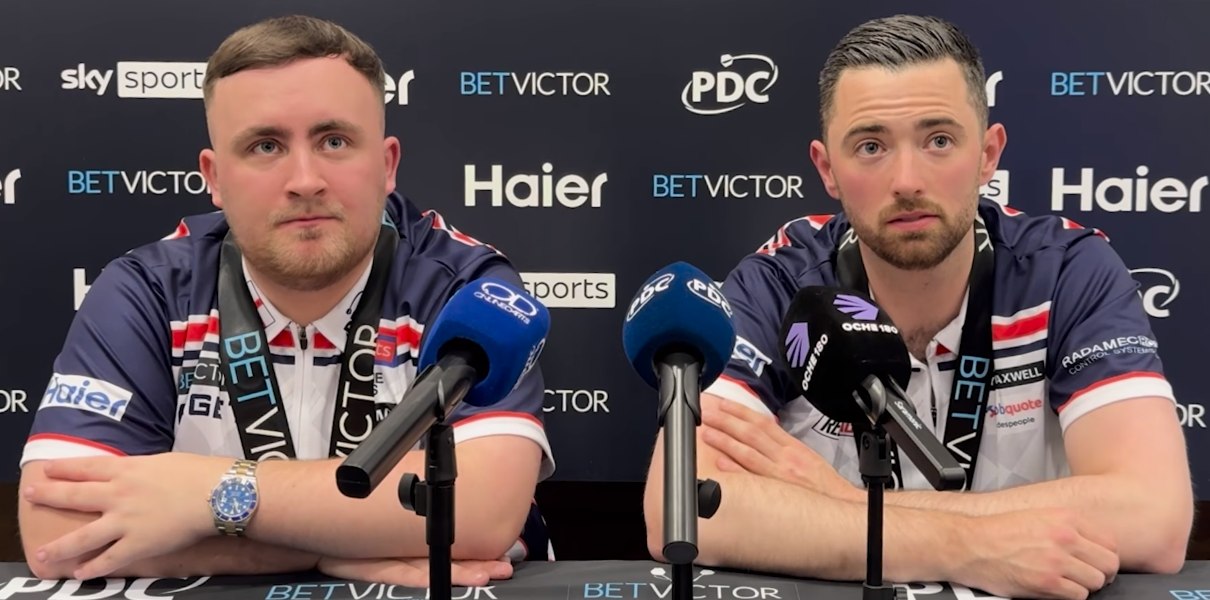
Top seeds England, represented by Luke Littler and Luke Humphries (pictured at the event), won a record-extending sixth World Cup of Darts title.

England won a record-extending sixth World Cup title, denying the Netherlands a record-equalling fifth title. It was Humphries' second World Cup, while Littler won it for the first time. Littler and Humphries became the third different English duo to win the World Cup, after four-time champions Phil Taylor and Adrian Lewis, and 2024 champions Humphries and Michael Smith. England received the top prize of £100,000, while runners-up the Netherlands received £48,000. Speaking after the match, Humphries stated that the pressure put on him and Littler to win the title made the victory more special. He also outlined his hopes of the pair winning more World Cup titles than Taylor and Lewis, while also commenting on the dynamic of partnering a great rival: "You put those differences aside. We're here to win as a team, we won as a team and I'm really, really proud." Winning the World Cup continued Littler's streak of televised titles in 2026, adding to his victories at the World Championship, World Masters, UK Open, and Premier League. "All the talk now is, am I going to lift every major this year? If I keep playing the way I do, then yeah, I've got a brilliant chance," remarked the reigning world champion in response to talk of a 2026 clean sweep, which would include completing his honours list with his final major singles title, the European Championship. On his team's performance, Littler praised Humphries' contributions and confirmed the duo's plans to defend the title the following year. Speaking in defeat, Van Gerwen said that the English pair played an "absolutely phenomenal final" that was built on confidence from their quarter-final against Wales, where the three-time world champion claimed they "got a bit lucky" during their route.

== Group stage ==
The group stage draw was announced on 3 June. Bracketed numbers show the seedings for the top twelve teams in the group stage. The figures to the right of a nation's name state their three-dart average in a match. Nations in bold denote match winners.

All group matches were best of 7 legs
After three games, the team that finished top in each group qualifies for the knockout stage
If teams were tied on points after all the matches are completed, the ties were broken based on leg difference

NB: P = Played; W = Won; L = Lost; LF = Legs for; LA = Legs against; LD = Leg difference; Pts = Points

=== Group A ===
Pos.	Team	P	W	L	LF	LA	+/-	Pts	Status
1	**Germany (5)**	2	2	0	8	2	+6	**4**	**Q**
2	Philippines	2	1	1	4	5	–1	**2**	E
3	New Zealand	2	0	2	3	8	–5	**0**	E

11 June

**Germany 101.90**	**4**–0	Philippines 78.21

12 June

**Philippines 98.09**	**4**–1	New Zealand 78.38
**Germany 84.12**	**4**–2	New Zealand 78.31

=== Group B ===
Pos.	Team	P	W	L	LF	LA	+/-	Pts	Status
1	**Belgium (6)**	2	1	1	6	5	+1	**2**	**Q**
2	Hong Kong	2	1	1	6	6	0	**2**	E
3	Slovenia	2	1	1	5	6	–1	**2**	E

11 June

Belgium 88.16	2–**4**	**Hong Kong 87.38**

12 June

**Belgium 83.34**	**4**–1	Slovenia 79.88
Hong Kong 80.62	2–**4**	**Slovenia 79.18**

=== Group C ===
Pos.	Team	P	W	L	LF	LA	+/-	Pts	Status
1	**Wales (7)**	2	2	0	8	2	+6	**4**	**Q**
2	Lithuania	2	1	1	5	6	–1	**2**	E
3	Thailand	2	0	2	3	8	–5	**0**	E

11 June

**Wales 92.19**	**4**–1	Lithuania 84.04

12 June

**Lithuania 75.70**	**4**–2	Thailand 67.83
**Wales 77.59**	**4**–1	Thailand 76.33

=== Group D ===
Pos.	Team	P	W	L	LF	LA	+/-	Pts	Status
1	**Ireland (8)**	2	2	0	8	3	+5	**4**	**Q**
2	Singapore	2	1	1	5	6	–1	**2**	E
3	Gibraltar	2	0	2	4	8	–4	**0**	E

11 June

**Ireland 90.38**	**4**–1	Singapore 91.42

12 June

**Singapore 79.17**	**4**–2	Gibraltar 78.89
**Ireland 91.73**	**4**–2	Gibraltar 91.97

=== Group E ===
Pos.	Team	P	W	L	LF	LA	+/-	Pts	Status
1	**Poland (9)**	2	2	0	8	3	+5	**4**	**Q**
2	Switzerland	2	1	1	6	5	+1	**2**	E
3	Portugal	2	0	2	2	8	–6	**0**	E

11 June

**Poland 88.66**	**4**–1	Portugal 83.96

12 June

Portugal 74.85	1–**4**	**Switzerland 87.03**
**Poland 87.92**	**4**–2	Switzerland 80.24

=== Group F ===
Pos.	Team	P	W	L	LF	LA	+/-	Pts	Status
1	**Sweden (10)**	2	2	0	8	3	+5	**4**	**Q**
2	South Africa	2	1	1	6	5	+1	**2**	E
3	Mongolia	2	0	2	2	8	–6	**0**	E

11 June

**Sweden 76.66**	**4**–2	South Africa 81.72

12 June

**South Africa 63.21**	**4**–1	Mongolia 61.50
**Sweden 96.08**	**4**–1	Mongolia 74.80

=== Group G ===
Pos.	Team	P	W	L	LF	LA	+/-	Pts	Status
1	**United States**	2	2	0	8	5	+3	**4**	**Q**
2	Canada	2	1	1	6	5	+1	**2**	E
3	Australia (11)	2	0	2	4	8	–4	**0**	E

11 June

Australia 87.72	3–**4**	**United States 83.07**

12 June

Australia 76.03	1–**4**	**Canada 78.17**
**United States 82.69**	**4**–2	Canada 77.26

=== Group H ===
Pos.	Team	P	W	L	LF	LA	+/-	Pts	Status
1	**Czech Republic (12)**	2	2	0	8	1	+7	**4**	**Q**
2	Denmark	2	1	1	5	5	0	**2**	E
3	India	2	0	2	1	8	–7	**0**	E

11 June

**Czech Republic 84.68**	**4**–0	India 72.43

12 June

India 70.05	1–**4**	**Denmark 74.10**
**Czech Republic 89.29**	**4**–1	Denmark 76.94

=== Group I ===
Pos.	Team	P	W	L	LF	LA	+/-	Pts	Status
1	**France**	2	2	0	8	6	+2	**4**	**Q**
2	Austria (13)	2	1	1	7	5	+2	**2**	E
3	China	2	0	2	4	8	–4	**0**	E

11 June

**Austria 97.38**	**4**–1	China 73.84

12 June

China 75.10	3–**4**	**France 77.14**
Austria 89.27	3–**4**	**France 86.52**

=== Group J ===
Pos.	Team	P	W	L	LF	LA	+/-	Pts	Status
1	**Latvia (14)**	2	1	1	7	6	+1	**2**	**Q**
2	Italy	2	1	1	6	6	0	**2**	E
3	Trinidad and Tobago	2	1	1	6	7	–1	**2**	E

11 June

**Latvia 83.83**	**4**–2	Italy 78.46

12 June

**Italy 79.85**	**4**–2	Trinidad and Tobago 61.59
Latvia 79.66	3–**4**	**Trinidad and Tobago 77.32**

=== Group K ===
Pos.	Team	P	W	L	LF	LA	+/-	Pts	Status
1	**Spain**	2	2	0	8	4	+4	**4**	**Q**
2	Japan	2	1	1	5	7	–2	**2**	E
3	Croatia (15)	2	0	2	6	8	–2	**0**	E

11 June

Croatia 91.93	3–**4**	**Japan 91.05**

12 June

Croatia 85.51	3–**4**	**Spain 83.48**
Japan 86.54	1–**4**	**Spain 90.18**

=== Group L ===
Pos.	Team	P	W	L	LF	LA	+/-	Pts	Status
1	**Norway**	2	2	0	8	6	+2	**4**	**Q**
2	Hungary	2	1	1	7	4	+3	**2**	E
3	Finland (16)	2	0	2	3	8	–5	**0**	E

11 June

Finland 80.93	3–**4**	**Norway 78.22**

12 June

Finland 73.80	0–**4**	**Hungary 80.16**
**Norway 80.95**	**4**–3	Hungary 78.64

== Knockout stage ==
The draw for the knockout stage was conducted by John Part following the culmination of the group stage on 12 June. England, the Netherlands, Northern Ireland, and Scotland entered the draw as the top four seeds, while the twelve group winners were drawn into the bracket at random. Numbers to the left of nations' names show the seedings for the top sixteen teams in the tournament. The figures to the right of a nation's name state their three-dart average in a match. Players in bold denote match winners.

**Second round** (best of 15 legs); 13 June
**1**	**England 94.11**	**8**
Spain 96.13	5
**7**	**Wales 89.32**	**8**
United States 85.75	5
**4**	**Scotland 99.37**	**8**
Norway 83.82	0
**8**	**Ireland 92.21**	**8**
9	Poland 91.71	5
**2**	**Netherlands 94.08**	**8**
10	Sweden 89.20	6
**5**	**Germany 92.09**	**8**
12	Czech Republic 90.07	6
**3**	**Northern Ireland 94.21**	**8**
6	Belgium 86.83	7
**14**	**Latvia 79.53**	**8**
France 77.80	7

**Quarter-finals** (best of 15 legs); 14 June
**1**	**England 96.50**	**8**
7	Wales 93.58	7
**4**	**Scotland 99.64**	**8**
8	Ireland 96.39	5
**2**	**Netherlands 102.68**	**8**
5	Germany 96.58	4
**3**	**Northern Ireland 96.00**	**8**
14	Latvia 92.78	7

**Semi-finals** (best of 15 legs); 14 June
**1**	**England 101.59**	**8**
4	Scotland 88.82	3
**2**	**Netherlands 101.55**	**8**
3	Northern Ireland 97.19	2

**Final** (best of 19 legs); 14 June
**1**	**England 104.77**	**10**
2	Netherlands 98.30	5
