= RTL7 Masters =

2011 professional darts tournament

2011 RTL7 Masters

Tournament information
- Dates: 18–21 March 2011
- Venue: Hotel Zuiderduin
- Location: Egmond aan Zee
- Country: Netherlands
- Organisation(s): PDC
- Format: Legs
- Prize fund: €80,000
- Winner's share: €20,000

Champion(s)
- Phil Taylor (ENG)

The RTL7 Masters (also called the RTL7 International Masters) was a professional darts tournament held at the Hotel Zuiderduin in Egmond aan Zee, Netherlands, between 18 and 21 March 2011. It was the second of the seven non-ranking Professional Darts Corporation (PDC) events in the 2011 season. The competition was created by RTL 7 as a new darts tournament to be staged in the Netherlands and was contested by 12 players: six from the Netherlands and six foreigners in four groups of three.

Phil Taylor defeated Raymond van Barneveld by eight legs to three in the final. He achieved the highest average in a televised final of 113.6 points, improving on the record he set in the 2010 Premier League Darts final. Before his match with Van Barneveld, Taylor won his group with victories over Adrian Lewis and Terry Jenkins, beat James Wade in the quarter-finals and Gary Anderson in the semi-finals.

== Background and format ==
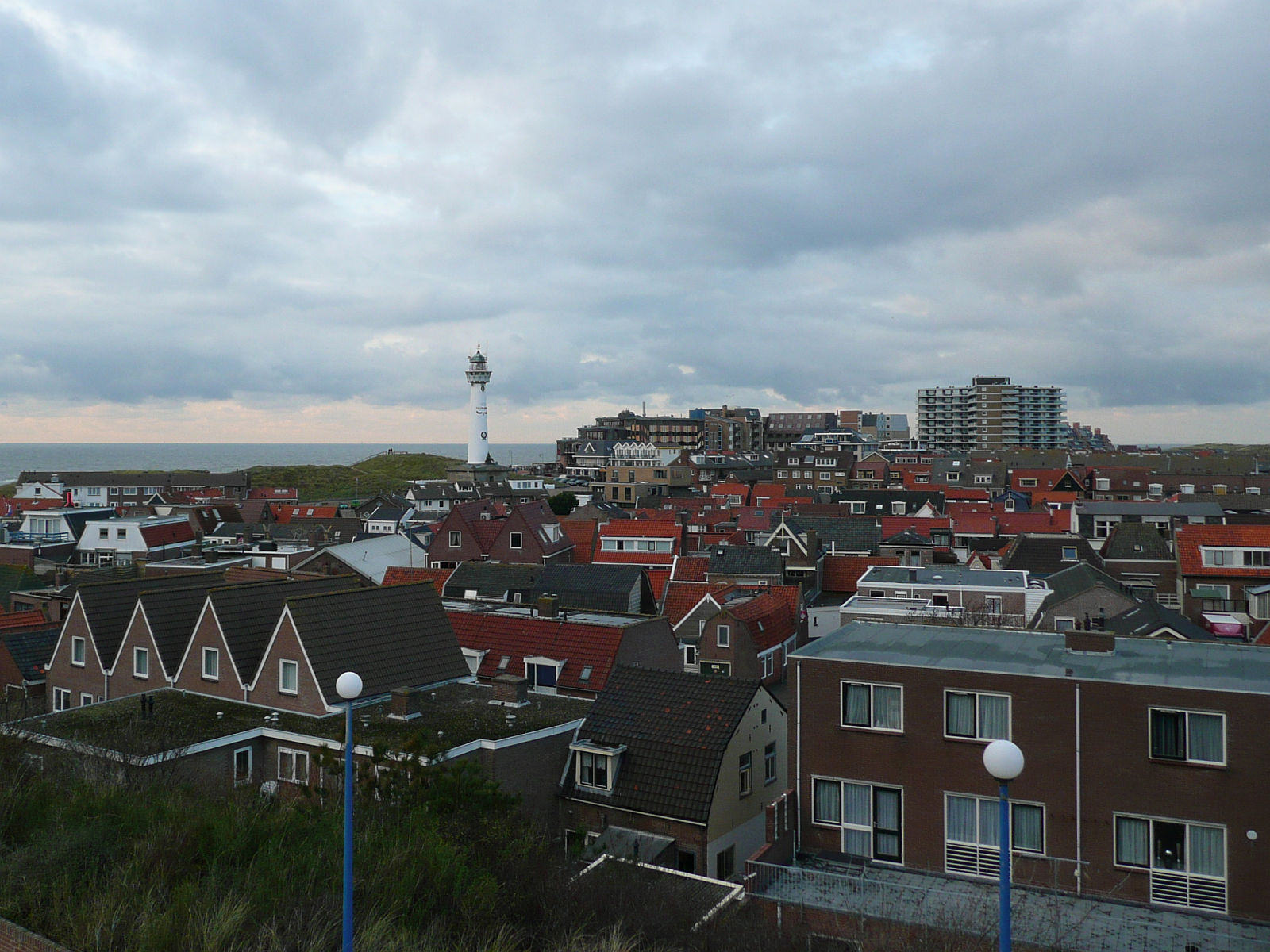
Egmond aan Zee, where the tournament was held

RTL 7 established the RTL7 Masters as a new darts tournament to be held in the Netherlands after it acquired the rights of darts from SBS6. On 22 February 2011, RTL 7 announced the tournament would be staged by the Professional Darts Corporation (PDC) at the Hotel Zuiderduin in Egmond aan Zee, from 18 to 21 March. It was the second of seven non-ranking PDC competitions in the 2011 season, and had a total prize fund of €80,000. The tournament would be broadcast live in the Netherlands on RTL 7 with commentary from Albert Mantingh and Jacques Nieuwlaat.

A total of 12 players would enter the competition: six from the Netherlands and six from other countries. This would be the first televised darts tournament in the Netherlands to feature non-Dutch players since the 2007 World Darts Trophy. Every match was the best-of-15 legs, and all players were divided into three groups of four. If there was a tie on points in a group, the order would be determined by a game between the tied players. The first quarter-final victor would play the third quarter-final winner in the first semi-final with the second and fourth quarter-final victors in the other semi-final. The order in which the semi-finals would be held would be decided after all four quarter-finals. The final on 21 March would be contested by a Dutchman and a non-Dutch participant.

=== Prize fund ===
The breakdown of prize money is shown below:

- Winner: €20,000
- Runner-up: €12,000
- Semi-finalists (×2): €8,000
- Quarter-finalists (×4): €5,000
- Group stage (×4): €3,000
- Total: €80,000

== Group stages ==
Group A took place on 18 March. Co Stompé played the first match against Jelle Klaasen. Tied at 2–2, Stompé took five legs in a row as Klaasen failed to strike a double ring three times. Stompé won the game 8–3 on his sixth try at finishing on the double seven ring. The next match featured Stompé and the 2004 UK Open winner Roland Scholten. Stompé achieved finishes on the double 4 and top rings, a 161 checkout in leg seven and two maximum scores to win 8–1 and qualify for the quarter-finals. The final match of the group was between Klaasen and Scholten. The first ten legs were shared to enter a five-leg shootout. Scholten won 8–5 with finishes on the double 8, 7 and 10 rings in the final three legs to knock out Klaasen and qualify for the quarter-finals.

Group B was played on 19 March. The first match was between 15-time world title winner Phil Taylor and Terry Jenkins. Taylor led 3–0 on checkouts of 84 and 124 in legs two and three before Jenkins took leg four on a 100 checkout. Taylor won the next two legs on the double 4 and 20 rings. Jenkins took leg seven in 12 throws and the eighth on a 104 checkout completed on the double 12 ring. Taylor won three of the next four legs to win 8–4. Taylor and world champion Adrian Lewis played the group's second fixture. The first two legs were shared before Taylor took a 4–1 lead. Checkouts of 124 and 100 gave Lewis legs six and seven before Taylor won four of the next five legs to win 8–4 and a quarter-final spot. Both men each made six maximum scores. The final game between Lewis and Jenkins went to 2–2 before the former won three legs in a row to go 5–2 ahead. Jenkins won leg eight after Lewis failed to complete a 103 checkout. Lewis took three more legs to win 8–3 and a quarter-final spot.

Group C was staged on the same day. Raymond van Barneveld and the 2007 UK Open runner-up Vincent van der Voort played the group's first game. The match was tied 1–1 and later 4–4 and 5–5 before Van Barneveld won the 11th and 12th legs to lead by two legs. The 13th leg was won by Van Der Voort after Van Barneveld missed three attempts to win the game. Van Barneveld completed a 8–6 victory on the double 20 ring after Van Der Voort failed to hit the bullseye ring. The next group match was between Michael van Gerwen and Van Barneveld. Tied at 2–2, checkouts of 64 and 88 and a 13-dart finish gave Van Barneveld a 5–2 lead. The next two legs were shared before Van Gerwen took legs 10 and 11 on checkouts of 114 and 66. Van Barneveld made a 116 checkout and a 13-dart finish to claim the next two legs for a 8–5 win and a quarter-final entry. Van Der Voort began the final third group match against Van Gerwen by leading 4–1 until the latter won three legs in a row to equal at 4–4. Van Der Voort took four consecutive legs to win 8–4 and reach the quarter-finals.

Group D was held on 20 March. Gary Anderson and James Wade played the group's first match, which was tied at 3–3 after six legs. Anderson moved two legs ahead with 12 and 14-dart finishes respectively before Wade finished on the double ten ring in leg nine. Anderson used two misses from Wade on the bullseye ring to claim legs 10 and 11 and achieved a finish of 15 throws in the 12th to win 8–4. Simon Whitlock began Group D's second game against Anderson by winning the first three legs on checkouts of 161 and 165 in legs one and two and hitting the double 16 ring to claim leg three. Anderson took leg four on the double 11 ring. Anderson subsequently won the next six legs to lead 7–3. Whitlock won one further leg and Anderson took an 8–4 victory for entry to the quarter-finals with a finish on the double 10 ring. The final group game was between Wade and Whitlock. The first four legs were shared before Wade won the next four to lead 6–2. Whitlock took legs 9 to 12 to level at 6–6 until legs 13 and 14 were shared to force a final leg decider. Wade won the final leg on the double top ring for a 8–7 victory and the last quarter-final spot.

== Knockout rounds ==
=== Quarter-finals ===
The four quarter-finals took place on 20 March. Stompé played Van Der Voort in the first quarter-final, which was tied at 5–5 after ten legs. Van Der Voort made a maximum score and won the 11th leg on a 36 checkout after Stompé could not strike a double ring. He took leg 12 after Stompé was unable to win it four times before the latter claimed leg 13 on a 106 checkout. Van Der Voort took leg 14 on the double 19 ring to win the first semi-final spot 8–6. The second quarter-final was between Taylor and Wade. Taylor took the first three legs before Wade took two legs in a row to be 3–2 behind. Taylor claimed four more legs and needed one more for victory but Wade made an 83 checkout in leg 10. A missed opportunity for Wade at a 116 checkout allowed Taylor to achieve a 108 checkout and win 8–3. Taylor said while he appeared serious playing Wade he was enjoying the event, adding: "My finishing was superb against James and it had to be because he was coming off the back of a great win against Simon."

Scholten and Van Barneveld contested the third quarter-final. The first four legs were shared; Van Barneveld made checkouts of 161 and 170 in legs one and three and Scholten won legs two and four on the double 4 and 20 rings. Van Barneveld achieved finishes on the double 16, 18, 6, 8 and 19 rings to be within one leg of victory. Scholten achieved a 13-dart finish in leg ten before Van Barneveld won the match 8–3 on the double 8 ring. Van Barneveld observed his performance in the competition and said it was important to maintain his finishing in the next round. The last quarter-final was between Anderson and Lewis. The first four legs were won by Lewis and Anderson took the next four to equal at 4–4. Lewis took leg nine on the double 9 ring to retake the lead until Anderson made an 80 checkout to again level. Anderson took the next three legs to earn the last semi-final spot 8–5. He beat Lewis for the first time since 2009 and requited losses to him in the 2011 World Championship final and the 2011 Premier League Darts Glasgow meet.

=== Semi-finals and final ===
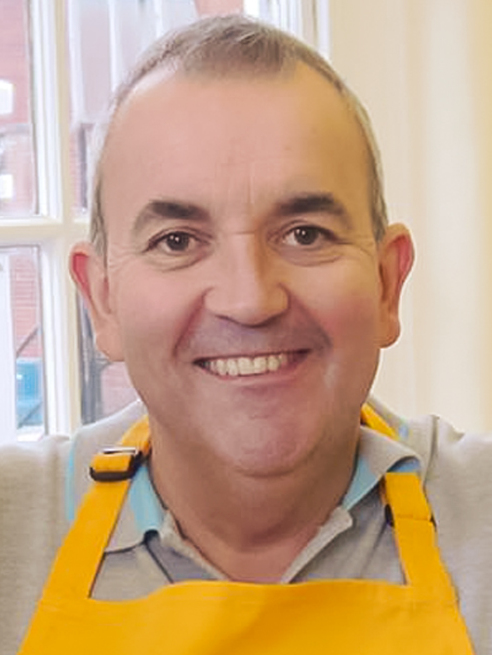
Phil Taylor (pictured in 2013) defeated Raymond van Barneveld 8–3 in the final.

Both of the semi-finals were held on 21 March. The first semi-final was between Van Barneveld and Van Der Voort. Van Barneveld won the first four legs from an 89 checkout, a finish on the double 20 ring, an 86 checkout and a finish on the double 8 ring. Van Der Voort ended the streak in leg five with a finish on the double 16 ring after Van Barneveld twice failed to hit the double 12 ring. The sixth leg was won by Van Barneveld on the double 20 ring in 13 throws and the seventh by Van Der Voort on the double 10 ring. Van Barneveld took three legs in a row to win 8–2 and enter the final. The other semi-final was between Anderson and Taylor. Both players shared the first six legs of the match. Taylor took leg seven on the double 16 ring after Anderson failed to hit the bullseye ring for a 130 checkout. Taylor took a two-leg lead on the double 20 ring in leg eight and consecutive finishes on the double 8 ring in legs nine and ten before Anderson took leg 11 on the double 20 ring. Taylor won the match 8–4 at his fourth try at hitting the double 9 ring to qualify for the final.

The final between Taylor and Van Barneveld was held that same day. Taylor achieved a maximum score before Van Barneveld won the first leg with an 80 checkout completed in two throws. Van Barneveld made the checkout after Taylor failed to finish on the double 20 ring. Taylor tied the match with a 11-dart finish completed on the double 20 ring and took the lead with a finish on the double 16 ring in 14 throws. He achieved an 89 checkout in 11 throws to increase his lead before Van Barneveld clinched leg five on the double 16 ring. Taylor won the following three legs to go 6–2 ahead. Van Barneveld won the ninth leg on the double 17 ring in 14 throws after Taylor failed to complete a 167 checkout on the bullseye ring. Taylor made an 84 checkout in leg 10 and finished on the double 18 ring in the 11th to win the match 8–3.

Taylor earned €20,000 prize money for winning the tournament, and achieved a 113.6-point three-dart average, the highest for the final of a televised event. He improved on the 111.67 average over Wade in the 2010 Premier League Darts final. It was Van Barneveld's seventh loss in a row to Taylor in the final of a competition. Taylor said he was pleased to win the event and enjoyed the final with Van Barneveld because it showed his best traits, adding: "The key leg was the sixth when Raymond missed two darts to take out 98, and after that I dug in and got the job done. I've really enjoyed the tournament and it's a great way to finish."

== Draw and results ==
The players highlighted in bold text in the table indicate who progressed to the quarter-finals. Players in bold to the right of the tables denote match winners.

=== Group A ===
Group A final table
POS	Player	MP	MW	ML	LF	LA	+/−	AVG	PTS
1	**Co Stompé** (NED)	2	2	0	16	4	+12	91.52	4
2	**Roland Scholten** (NED)	2	1	1	9	13	−4	85.28	2
3	Jelle Klaasen (NED)	2	0	2	8	16	−8	87.36	0

- **Co Stompé** (NED) 87.57 **8** – 3 Jelle Klaasen (NED) 87.59
- Roland Scholten (NED) 87.07 1 – **8** **Co Stompé** (NED) 95.47
- Jelle Klaasen (NED) 87.13 5 – **8** **Roland Scholten** (NED) 83.48

=== Group B ===
Group B final table
POS	Player	MP	MW	ML	LF	LA	+/−	AVG	PTS
1	**Phil Taylor** (ENG)	2	2	0	16	8	+8	110.31	4
2	**Adrian Lewis** (ENG)	2	1	1	12	11	+1	104.77	2
3	Terry Jenkins (ENG)	2	0	2	7	16	−9	96.40	0

- **Phil Taylor** (ENG) 106.69 **8** – 4 Terry Jenkins (ENG) 98.72
- Adrian Lewis (ENG) 108.78 4 – **8** **Phil Taylor** (ENG) 113.92
- Terry Jenkins (ENG) 94.08 3 – **8** **Adrian Lewis** (ENG) 100.76

=== Group C ===
Group C final table
POS	Player	MP	MW	ML	LF	LA	+/−	AVG	PTS
1	**Raymond van Barneveld** (NED)	2	2	0	16	11	+5	100.47	4
2	**Vincent van der Voort** (NED)	2	1	1	14	12	+2	94.67	2
3	Michael van Gerwen (NED)	2	0	2	9	16	−7	96.31	0

- **Raymond van Barneveld** (NED) 97.63 **8** – 6 Vincent van der Voort (NED) 95.88
- Michael van Gerwen (NED) 97.65 5 – **8** **Raymond van Barneveld** (NED) 103.31
- **Vincent van der Voort** (NED) 93.46 **8** – 4 Michael van Gerwen (NED) 94.96

=== Group D ===
Group D final table
POS	Player	MP	MW	ML	LF	LA	+/−	AVG	PTS
1	**Gary Anderson** (SCO)	2	2	0	16	8	+8	99.82	4
2	**James Wade** (ENG)	2	1	1	12	15	−3	93.06	2
3	Simon Whitlock (AUS)	2	0	2	11	16	−5	96.98	0

- **Gary Anderson** (SCO) 94.91 **8** – 4 James Wade (ENG) 88.60
- Simon Whitlock (AUS) 99.00 4 – **8** **Gary Anderson** (SCO) 104.73
- **James Wade** (ENG) 97.51 8 – **7** Simon Whitlock (AUS) 94.96

=== Knockout rounds ===
Figures given to the left of player's names state their finishing position in a group. The figures in brackets to the right of a competitor's name are their three-dart averages in a match. Players in bold denote match winners.

**Quarter-finals** (best of 15 legs); 20 March
A1	Co Stompé (NED) 85.82	6
C2	**Vincent van der Voort** (NED) 90.13	**8**
C1	**Raymond van Barneveld** (NED) 99.53	**8**
A2	Roland Scholten (NED) 88.78	3
B1	**Phil Taylor** (ENG) 107.65	**8**
D2	James Wade (ENG) 98.93	3
D1	**Gary Anderson** (SCO) 100.57	**8**
B2	Adrian Lewis (ENG) 100.22	5

**Semi-finals** (best of 15 legs); 21 March
C2	(Netherlands) Vincent van der Voort 92.98	2
C1	(Netherlands) **Raymond van Barneveld** 101.92	**8**
B1	(England) **Phil Taylor** 95.56	**8**
D1	(Scotland) Gary Anderson 96.12	4

**Final** (best of 15 legs); 21 March
C1	(Netherlands) Raymond van Barneveld 94.38	3
B1	(England) **Phil Taylor** 113.60	**8**
