= 2014 Denmark Open darts =

Denmark Open

Tournament information
- Dates: 2–3 May 2014
- Venue: Esbjerg Conference Hotel
- Location: Esbjerg
- Country: Denmark
- Organisation(s): BDO, WDF, DDU
- Winner's share: 20,000 DKK

Champion(s)
- (England) Alan Norris

2014 Denmark Open is a darts tournament, which took place in Esbjerg, Denmark in 2014.

== Results ==
=== Last 32 ===
Final 32
(England)	Alan Norris
(Netherlands)	Willem Mandigers
(Denmark)	Per Skau
(Netherlands)	Mark Oosterhuis
(Denmark)	Vladimir Andersen
(Netherlands)	Wilco Vermeulen
(Sweden)	Peter Sajwani
(England)	Phil Blackwell
(Belgium)	Geert De Vos
(Germany)	Kevin Münch
(England)	Garry Thompson
(Finland)	Sami Sanssi
(England)	James Hurrell
(England)	Martin Atkins
(Belgium)	Sven Verdonck
(England)	Jamie Hughes
(Netherlands)	Jeffrey de Graaf
(Netherlands)	Michel de Cuyper
(Netherlands)	Sven Groen
(Sweden)	Janne Hermansson
(Denmark)	Finn Madsen
(England)	James Summers
(England)	Jason Crawley
(Germany)	Michel Helder
(Netherlands)	Wesley Harms
(Denmark)	Jimmi Andersen
(England)	Sam Head
(Denmark)	Tommy Haulrich
(England)	Dave Smith
(Netherlands)	Co Stompé
(Netherlands)	Matthew Medhurst
(Netherlands)	Remco van Eijden

Final 16
(England)	Alan Norris
(Denmark)	Per Skau
(Denmark)	Vladimir Andersen
(Sweden)	Peter Sajwani
(Belgium)	Geert De Vos
(England)	Garry Thompson
(England)	James Hurrell
(Belgium)	Sven Verdonck
(Netherlands)	Jeffrey de Graaf
(Netherlands)	Sven Groen
(Denmark)	Finn Madsen
(England)	Jason Crawley
(Netherlands)	Wesley Harms
(England)	Sam Head
(England)	Dave Smith
(Netherlands)	Matthew Medhurst

Quarter-finals
(England)	Alan Norris
(Denmark)	Vladimir Andersen
(Belgium)	Geert De Vos
(England)	James Hurrell
(Netherlands)	Jeffrey de Graaf
(Denmark)	Finn Madsen
(Netherlands)	Wesley Harms
(England)	Dave Smith

Semi-finals
(England)	Alan Norris
(Belgium)	Geert De Vos
(Netherlands)	Jeffrey de Graaf
(Netherlands)	Wesley Harms

Final
(England)	Alan Norris
(Netherlands)	Jeffrey de Graaf
