= 2014 Zuiderduin Masters =

Zuiderduin Masters

Tournament information
- Dates: 5–7 December 2014
- Venue: Hotel Zuiderduin
- Location: Egmond aan Zee
- Country: North Holland, the Netherlands
- Organisation(s): BDO / WDF
- Format: Legs (group stage); Sets (Knock out stage); Final – best of 9 Sets (men) Final – best of 3 Sets (women)
- High checkout: 164 (Belgium) Geert De Vos

Champion(s)
- (England) Jamie Hughes (men) (Russia) Anastasia Dobromyslova (women)

The 2014 Zuiderduin Masters is a BDO/WDF darts tournament that took place in Egmond aan Zee, Netherlands.

== Qualifying ==
The players in bold are the seeded players for the group stages. The players in italics qualified through more than one method.

=== Men ===
Qualifying Criteria		Player	Ref
2013–14 Zuiderduin Masters; Rankings – Top 16	1	(Netherlands) **Wesley Harms**	
2013–14 Zuiderduin Masters; Rankings – Top 16	2	(England) **Martin Adams**	
2013–14 Zuiderduin Masters; Rankings – Top 16	3	(Netherlands) **Rick Hofstra**	
2013–14 Zuiderduin Masters; Rankings – Top 16	4	(England) **Scott Mitchell**	
2013–14 Zuiderduin Masters; Rankings – Top 16	5	(Netherlands) **Jan Dekker**	
2013–14 Zuiderduin Masters; Rankings – Top 16	6	(Belgium) **Geert De Vos**	
2013–14 Zuiderduin Masters; Rankings – Top 16	7	(England) **Gary Robson**	
2013–14 Zuiderduin Masters; Rankings – Top 16	8	(England) **Tony O'Shea**	
2013–14 Zuiderduin Masters; Rankings – Top 16	9	(England) Jamie Hughes	
2013–14 Zuiderduin Masters; Rankings – Top 16	10	(England) Alan Norris	
2013–14 Zuiderduin Masters; Rankings – Top 16	11	(England) James Wilson	
2013–14 Zuiderduin Masters; Rankings – Top 16	12	(England) Scott Waites	
2013–14 Zuiderduin Masters; Rankings – Top 16	13	(Netherlands) Jeffrey de Graaf	
2013–14 Zuiderduin Masters; Rankings – Top 16	14	(Netherlands) Michel van der Horst	
2013–14 Zuiderduin Masters; Rankings – Top 16	15	(Netherlands) Remco van Eijden	
2013–14 Zuiderduin Masters; Rankings – Top 16	16	(Scotland) Ross Montgomery	
2013 Zuiderduin Masters winner		(England) James Wilson	
2014 NDB Champions League of Darts winner		(Netherlands) Yordi Meeuwisse	
2014 Hal Open winner		(England) **Martin Adams**	
Wildcards		(Netherlands) Co Stompé	
Wildcards		(England) Darryl Fitton	
Wildcards		(England) Ted Hankey	
Wildcards		(Wales) Martin Phillips	
Wildcards		(Netherlands) Willem Mandigers	
Wildcards		(Latvia) Madars Razma	
Wildcards		(Netherlands) Richard Veenstra	
Notes; Martin Adams finished 2nd on Zuiderduin Masters rankings and won 2013 Hal Open so an extra wildcard was awarded. James Wilson qualified through Zuiderduin Masters rankings and won 2013; Zuiderduin Masters so another extra wildcard was awarded.

=== Women ===
Qualifying Criteria		Player	Ref
2013–14 Zuiderduin Masters; Rankings – Top 2	1	(Netherlands) **Aileen de Graaf**	
2013–14 Zuiderduin Masters; Rankings – Top 2	2	(Russia) **Anastasia Dobromyslova**	
2013 Zuiderduin Masters winner		(Netherlands) **Aileen de Graaf**	
2014 NDB Champions League of Darts winner		(Netherlands) Sharon Prins	
2014 Hal Open winner		(England) Deta Hedman	
Wildcards		(England) Fallon Sherrock	
Wildcards		(Denmark) Ann-Louise Peters	
Notes; Aileen de Graaf finished 1st on Zuiderduin Masters Rankings and won 2013 Zuiderduin; Masters so an extra wildcard was awarded.

== Men results ==
=== Men's tournament ===
==== Group stage ====
All matches best of 9 legs. Two points are gained for every match won.
P = Played; W = Won; L = Lost; LF = Legs for; LA = Legs against; +/− = Leg difference; Pts = Points

Group A

Pos	Name	P	W	L	LF	LA	+/−	Pts
1	(England) Darryl Fitton	2	2	0	10	5	+5	4
2	(Netherlands) (1) Wesley Harms	2	1	1	8	7	+1	2
3	(Netherlands) Willem Mandigers	2	0	2	4	10	−6	0

Group B

Pos	Name	P	W	L	LF	LA	+/−	Pts
1	(England) (8) Tony O'Shea	2	2	0	10	5	+5	4
2	(Netherlands) Yordi Meeuwisse	2	1	1	8	7	+1	2
3	(Netherlands) Co Stompé	2	0	2	4	10	−6	0

Group C

Pos	Name	P	W	L	LF	LA	+/−	Pts
1	(England) Jamie Hughes	2	2	0	10	5	+5	4
2	(Netherlands) (5) Jan Dekker	2	1	1	6	5	+1	2
3	(Latvia) Madars Razma	2	0	2	4	10	−6	0

Group D

Pos	Name	P	W	L	LF	LA	+/−	Pts
1	(Netherlands) Michel van der Horst	2	2	0	10	7	+3	4
2	(England) Scott Waites	2	1	1	9	5	+4	2
3	(England) (4) Scott Mitchell	2	0	2	3	10	−7	0

Group E

Pos	Name	P	W	L	LF	LA	+/−	Pts
1	(Netherlands) (3) Rick Hofstra	2	2	0	10	7	+3	4
2	(Scotland) Ross Montgomery	2	1	1	9	7	+2	2
3	(England) Alan Norris	2	0	2	5	10	−5	0

Group F

Pos	Name	P	W	L	LF	LA	+/−	Pts
1	(Belgium) (6) Geert De Vos	2	2	0	10	4	+6	4
2	(Netherlands) Remco van Eijden	2	1	1	8	8	0	2
3	(Netherlands) Jeffrey de Graaf	2	0	2	4	10	−6	0

Group G

Pos	Name	P	W	L	LF	LA	+/−	Pts
1	(England) (7) Gary Robson	2	2	0	10	7	+3	4
2	(England) Ted Hankey	2	1	1	8	8	0	2
3	(Netherlands) Richard Veenstra	2	0	2	7	10	−3	0

Group H

Pos	Name	P	W	L	LF	LA	+/−	Pts
1	(England) (2) Martin Adams	2	2	0	10	5	+5	4
2	(Wales) Martin Phillips	2	1	1	7	8	−1	2
3	(England) James Wilson	2	0	2	6	10	−4	0

==== Knockout stages ====
Quarter-finals; Best of 5 sets
(England) Darryl Fitton	2
8	(England) Tony O'Shea	3
(England) Jamie Hughes	3
(Netherlands) Michel van der Horst	0
(Netherlands) Rick Hofstra	0
6	(Belgium) Geert De Vos	3
7	(England) Gary Robson	3
2	(England) Martin Adams	2

Semi-finals; Best of 5 sets
8	(England) Tony O'Shea	2
(England) Jamie Hughes	3
6	(Belgium) Geert De Vos	2
7	(England) Gary Robson	3

Final; Best of 9 sets
(England) Jamie Hughes (96.12)	5
7	(England) Gary Robson (86.22)	0

== Women results ==
=== Women's tournament ===
==== Group stage ====
All matches best of 7 legs. Two points are gained for every match won.
P = Played; W = Won; L = Lost; LF = Legs for; LA = Legs against; +/− = Leg difference; Pts = Points

Group A

Pos	Name	P	W	L	LF	LA	+/−	Pts
1	(Netherlands) (1) Aileen de Graaf	2	2	0	8	6	+2	4
2	(Netherlands) Sharon Prins	2	1	1	7	7	0	2
3	(England) Fallon Sherrock	2	0	2	6	8	−2	0

Group B

Pos	Name	P	W	L	LF	LA	+/−	Pts
1	(Russia) (2) Anastasia Dobromyslova	2	1	1	7	4	+3	2
2	(Denmark) Ann Louise Peters	2	1	1	6	7	−1	2
3	(England) Deta Hedman	2	1	1	4	6	−2	2

==== Final ====
Best of 3 sets.

(Netherlands) (1) Aileen de Graaf (71.88) 1–2 (Russia) (2) Anastasia Dobromyslova (78.09)

== Youth results ==
=== Youth's tournament ===
==== Group stage ====
All matches best of 7 legs. Two points are gained for every match won.
P = Played; W = Won; L = Lost; LF = Legs for; LA = Legs against; +/− = Leg difference; Pts = Points

Group A

Pos	Name	P	W	L	LF	LA	+/−	Pts
1	(England) Callan Rydz	2	2	0	8	4	+4	4
2	(Netherlands) Colin Roelofs	2	1	1	7	4	+3	2
3	(Netherlands) Niels Zonneveld	2	0	2	1	8	−7	0

Group B

Pos	Name	P	W	L	LF	LA	+/−	Pts
1	(Netherlands) Mike van Duivenbode	2	2	0	8	1	+7	4
2	(Netherlands) Justin van Tergouw	2	1	1	5	4	+1	2
3	(Belgium) Lorenzo Schmelcher	2	0	2	0	8	−8	0

==== Final ====
Best of 3 sets.

(England) Callan Rydz 2–0 (Netherlands) Mike van Duivenbode
