= 2018 German Darts Grand Prix =

Tournament information
- Dates: 31 March–2 April 2018
- Venue: Kulturhalle Zenith
- Location: Munich, Germany
- Organisation(s): Professional Darts Corporation (PDC)
- Format: Legs
- Prize fund: £135,000
- Winner's share: £25,000
- High checkout: 170 James Wade

Champion(s)
- (Netherlands) Michael van Gerwen

The 2018 German Darts Grand Prix was the second of thirteen PDC European Tour events on the 2018 PDC Pro Tour. The tournament took place at Kulturhalle Zenith, Munich, Germany, from 31 March to 2 April 2018. It featured a field of 48 players and £135,000 in prize money, with £25,000 going to the winner.

Michael van Gerwen was the defending champion, after defeating Rob Cross 6–3 in the final of the 2017 tournament, and he retained his title by defeating Peter Wright 8–5 in the final.

== Prize money ==
This is how the prize money is divided:

Stage (num. of players)		Prize money
Winner	(1)	£25,000
Runner-up	(1)	£10,000
Semi-finalists	(2)	£6,000
Quarter-finalists	(4)	£4,000
Third round losers	(8)	£3,000
Second round losers	(16)	£2,000
First round losers	(16)	£1,000
Total	£135,000	

Prize money will count towards the PDC Order of Merit, the ProTour Order of Merit and the European Tour Order of Merit, with one exception: should a seeded player lose in the second round (last 32), their prize money will not count towards any Orders of Merit, although they still receive the full prize money payment.

== Qualification and format ==
The top 16 entrants from the PDC Pro Tour Order of Merit on 6 February automatically qualified for the event and were seeded in the second round.

The remaining 32 places went to players from five qualifying events – 18 from the UK Qualifier (held in Barnsley on 16 February), eight from the West/South European Qualifier (held on 22 March), four from the Host Nation Qualifier (held on 30 March), one from the Nordic & Baltic Qualifier (held on 26 January) and one from the East European Qualifier (held on 27 January).

The following players participated in the tournament:

Top 16
1. (Netherlands) Michael van Gerwen (champion)
2. (Scotland) Peter Wright (runner-up)
3. (England) Michael Smith (third round)
4. (England) Rob Cross (quarter-finals)
5. (Northern Ireland) Daryl Gurney (semi-finals)
6. (Austria) Mensur Suljović (third round)
7. (England) Joe Cullen (quarter-finals)
8. (Australia) Simon Whitlock (second round)
9. (England) Dave Chisnall (second round)
10. (Belgium) Kim Huybrechts (second round)
11. (England) Mervyn King (second round)
12. (England) Ian White (third round)
13. (Wales) Gerwyn Price (second round)
14. (Netherlands) Jelle Klaasen (second round)
15. (Australia) Kyle Anderson (second round)
16. (England) Alan Norris (third round)

UK Qualifier
- (England) Darren Webster (third round)
- (England) Nathan Aspinall (first round)
- (England) Stephen Bunting (second round)
- (England) Paul Rowley (first round)
- (Wales) Jonny Clayton (second round)
- (England) James Wade (semi-finals)
- (England) Josh Payne (second round)
- (England) Adrian Lewis (first round)
- (England) James Wilson (first round)
- (England) Alan Tabern (third round)
- (England) Scott Taylor (first round)
- (England) Steve West (third round)
- (England) Keegan Brown (quarter-finals)
- (England) Luke Humphries (third round)
- (Republic of Ireland) William O'Connor (first round)
- (Republic of Ireland) Steve Lennon (second round)
- (England) Chris Dobey (second round)
- (England) Ryan Meikle (second round)

West/South European Qualifier
- (Netherlands) Jermaine Wattimena (first round)
- (Spain) Toni Alcinas (second round)
- (Netherlands) Danny Noppert (second round)
- (Austria) Christian Gödl (first round)
- (Austria) Rowby-John Rodriguez (first round)
- (Netherlands) Yordi Meeuwisse (second round)
- (Austria) Michael Rasztovits (first round)
- (Netherlands) Jan Dekker (first round)

Host Nation Qualifier
- (Germany) René Berndt (first round)
- (Germany) Max Hopp (quarter-finals)
- (Germany) Martin Schindler (first round)
- (Germany) Maik Langendorf (first round)

Nordic & Baltic Qualifier
- (Latvia) Madars Razma (first round)

East European Qualifier
- (Poland) Krzysztof Ratajski (first round)

== Draw ==
First round (best of 11 legs); 31 March
(Republic of Ireland) Steve Lennon 99.95	6
(England) Nathan Aspinall 102.15	4
(England) James Wilson 89.09	2
(Spain) Toni Alcinas 88.85	6
(England) Keegan Brown 89.66	6
(Germany) Maik Langendorf 79.22	3
(England) Darren Webster 91.78	6
(Netherlands) Jan Dekker 91.88	2
(England) Ryan Meikle 81.64	6
(England) Scott Taylor 80.61	2
(England) Stephen Bunting 101.33	6
(Austria) Christian Gödl 92.00	0
(Wales) Jonny Clayton 93.87	6
(Germany) René Berndt 86.16	5
(Republic of Ireland) William O'Connor 88.15	2
(England) Luke Humphries 95.08	6
(England) Josh Payne 87.23	6
(Austria) Michael Rasztovits 88.56	5
(Netherlands) Jermaine Wattimena 83.94	5
(England) Alan Tabern 84.21	6
(England) Adrian Lewis 96.21	5
(Netherlands) Yordi Meeuwisse 94.92	6
(England) Steve West 79.03	6
(England) Paul Rowley 78.92	2
(Poland) Krzysztof Ratajski 79.86	3
(Netherlands) Danny Noppert 85.18	6
(Germany) Max Hopp 87.48	6
(Austria) Rowby-John Rodriguez 85.39	4
(England) Chris Dobey 99.40	6
(Germany) Martin Schindler 94.17	4
(England) James Wade 96.79	6
(Latvia) Madars Razma 93.16	2

Second round (best of 11 legs); 1 April
1	(Netherlands) Michael van Gerwen 95.20	6
(Republic of Ireland) Steve Lennon 96.39	5
16	(England) Alan Norris 93.70	6
(Spain) Toni Alcinas 81.46	1
8	(Australia) Simon Whitlock 91.27	4
(England) Keegan Brown 103.20	6
9	(England) Dave Chisnall 103.85	5
(England) Darren Webster 101.18	6
5	(Northern Ireland) Daryl Gurney 96.62	6
(England) Ryan Meikle 90.50	3
12	(England) Ian White 100.16	6
(England) Stephen Bunting 100.37	4
4	(England) Rob Cross 104.16	6
(Wales) Jonny Clayton 100.06	4
13	(Wales) Gerwyn Price 87.00	1
(England) Luke Humphries 100.31	6
2	(Scotland) Peter Wright 93.30	6
(England) Josh Payne 87.88	3
15	(Australia) Kyle Anderson 89.59	5
(England) Alan Tabern 89.81	6
7	(England) Joe Cullen 97.01	6
(Netherlands) Yordi Meeuwisse 96.49	5
10	(Belgium) Kim Huybrechts 88.01	3
(England) Steve West 84.86	6
6	(Austria) Mensur Suljović 95.94	6
(Netherlands) Danny Noppert 98.12	4
11	(England) Mervyn King 96.49	4
(Germany) Max Hopp 96.40	6
3	(England) Michael Smith 105.38	6
(England) Chris Dobey 93.69	2
14	(Netherlands) Jelle Klaasen 83.28	4
(England) James Wade 92.19	6

Third round (best of 11 legs); 2 April
1	(Netherlands) van Gerwen 105.38	6
16	(England) Norris 88.52	1
(England) Brown 89.77	6
(England) Webster 86.26	5
5	(Northern Ireland) Gurney 102.33	6
12	(England) White 101.02	4
4	(England) Cross 90.26	6
(England) Humphries 85.74	5
2	(Scotland) Wright 102.48	6
(England) Tabern 87.89	0
7	(England) Cullen 92.97	6
(England) West 84.52	0
6	(Austria) Suljović 100.88	2
(Germany) Hopp 102.25	6
3	(England) Smith 91.08	1
(England) Wade 97.80	6

Quarter-finals (best of 11 legs); 2 April
1	(Netherlands) van Gerwen 102.48	6
(England) Brown 89.07	0
5	(Northern Ireland) Gurney 91.09	6
4	(England) Cross 89.70	3
2	(Scotland) Wright 108.84	6
7	(England) Cullen 89.09	1
(Germany) Hopp 90.33	3
(England) Wade 95.98	6

Semi-finals (best of 13 legs); 2 April
1	(Netherlands) van Gerwen 99.76	7
5	(Northern Ireland) Gurney 91.20	3
2	(Scotland) Wright 100.10	7
(England) Wade 95.55	3

Final (best of 15 legs); 2 April
1	(Netherlands) van Gerwen 99.24	8
2	(Scotland) Wright 94.97	5
