= 2013 Zuiderduin Masters =

Zuiderduin Masters

Tournament information
- Dates: 6–8 December 2013
- Venue: Hotel Zuiderduin
- Location: Egmond aan Zee
- Country: North Holland, the Netherlands
- Organisation(s): BDO / WDF
- Format: Legs (group stage); Sets (Knock out stage); Final – best of 9 Sets (men) Final – best of 3 Sets (women)
- High checkout: 160 (England) Robbie Green

Champion(s)
- (England) James Wilson (Netherlands) Aileen de Graaf

The 2013 Zuiderduin Masters was a BDO/WDF darts tournament that took place in Egmond aan Zee, Netherlands.

James Wilson won the tournament for the first time, beating defending champion and number one seed Stephen Bunting in the final.

== Qualifying ==
The players in bold are the seeded players for the group stages. The players in italics qualified through more than one method.

=== Men ===
Qualifying Criteria		Player	Ref
2012-13 Zuiderduin Masters; Rankings – Top 16	1	(England) **Stephen Bunting**	
2012-13 Zuiderduin Masters; Rankings – Top 16	2	(Belgium) **Geert De Vos**	
2012-13 Zuiderduin Masters; Rankings – Top 16	3	(England) **Robbie Green**	
2012-13 Zuiderduin Masters; Rankings – Top 16	4	(Netherlands) **Wesley Harms**	
2012-13 Zuiderduin Masters; Rankings – Top 16	5	(England) **Richie George**	
2012-13 Zuiderduin Masters; Rankings – Top 16	6	(England) **Alan Norris**	
2012-13 Zuiderduin Masters; Rankings – Top 16	7	(England) **Tony O'Shea**	
2012-13 Zuiderduin Masters; Rankings – Top 16	8	(Netherlands) **Benito van de Pas**	
2012-13 Zuiderduin Masters; Rankings – Top 16	9	(England) Darryl Fitton	
2012-13 Zuiderduin Masters; Rankings – Top 16	10	(England) Gary Robson	
2012-13 Zuiderduin Masters; Rankings – Top 16	11	(England) Scott Waites	
2012-13 Zuiderduin Masters; Rankings – Top 16	12	(Netherlands) Jan Dekker	
2012-13 Zuiderduin Masters; Rankings – Top 16	13	(England) James Wilson	
2012-13 Zuiderduin Masters; Rankings – Top 16	14	(England) Scott Mitchell	
2012-13 Zuiderduin Masters; Rankings – Top 16	15	(Scotland) Ross Montgomery	
2012-13 Zuiderduin Masters; Rankings – Top 16	16	(Netherlands) Michel van der Horst	
2012 Zuiderduin Masters winner		(England) **Stephen Bunting**	
2013 NDB Champions League of Darts winner		(Netherlands) Yordi Meeuwisse	
2013 MariFlex Open winner		(England) **Stephen Bunting**	
Wildcards		(England) Martin Atkins	
Wildcards		(Netherlands) Danny Noppert	
Wildcards		(England) Martin Adams	
Wildcards		(United States) Jim Widmayer	
Wildcards		(Netherlands) Remco van Eijden	
Wildcards		(Netherlands) Rick Hofstra	
Wildcards		(Netherlands) Jeffrey de Zwaan	
Notes; Stephen Bunting finished 1st on Zuiderduin Masters Rankings, won 2012 Zuiderduin; Masters and 2013 MariFlex Open so two extra wildcards were awarded.

=== Women ===
Qualifying Criteria		Player	Ref
2012-13 Zuiderduin Masters; Rankings – Top 2	1	(Netherlands) **Aileen de Graaf**	
2012-13 Zuiderduin Masters; Rankings – Top 2	2	(England) **Deta Hedman**	
2012 Zuiderduin Masters winner		(Russia) Anastasia Dobromyslova	
2013 NDB Champions League of Darts winner		(Netherlands) Sharon Prins	
2013 MariFlex Open winner		(England) **Deta Hedman**	
Wildcards		(Netherlands) Rilana Erades	
Wildcards		(England) Trina Gulliver	
Notes; Deta Hedman finished 2nd on Zuiderduin Masters Rankings and won 2013 MariFlex; Open so an extra wildcard was awarded.

== Results ==
=== Men's tournament ===
==== Group stage ====
All matches best of 9 legs. Two points are gained for every match won.
P = Played; W = Won; L = Lost; LF = Legs for; LA = Legs against; +/− = Leg difference; Pts = Points

Group A

Pos	Name	P	W	L	LF	LA	+/−	Pts
1	(England) Stephen Bunting (1)	2	2	0	10	5	+5	4
2	(England) Martin Adams	2	1	1	9	7	+2	2
3	(United States) Jim Widmayer	2	0	2	3	10	−7	0

Martin Adams 83.18 5–2 Jim Widmayer 79.57

Stephen Bunting (1) 91.71 5–1 Jim Widmayer 78.31

Stephen Bunting (1) 105.40 5–4 Martin Adams 96.47

Group B

Pos	Name	P	W	L	LF	LA	+/−	Pts
1	(Netherlands) Benito van de Pas (8)	2	2	0	10	5	+5	4
2	(England) Martin Atkins	2	1	1	8	8	0	2
3	(Netherlands) Remco van Eijden	2	0	2	5	10	−5	0

Martin Atkins 91.22 5–3 Remco van Eijden 88.16

Benito van de Pas (8) 91.83 5–2 Remco van Eijden 72.68

Benito van de Pas (8) 79.71 5–3 Martin Atkins 81.72

Group C

Pos	Name	P	W	L	LF	LA	+/−	Pts
1	(Netherlands) Michel van der Horst	2	2	0	10	6	+4	4
2	(England) Scott Waites	2	1	1	7	6	+1	2
3	(England) Richie George (5)	2	0	2	5	10	−5	0

Michel van der Horst 88.42 5–2 Scott Waites 81.67

Scott Waites 88.34 5–1 Richie George (5) 79.12

Michel van der Horst 88.89 5–4 Richie George (5) 84.82

Group D

Pos	Name	P	W	L	LF	LA	+/−	Pts
1	(Netherlands) Wesley Harms (4)	2	2	0	10	5	+5	4
2	(Netherlands) Jan Dekker	2	1	1	9	8	+1	2
3	(England) Scott Mitchell	2	0	2	4	10	−6	0

Jan Dekker 80.59 5–3 Scott Mitchell 85.33

Wesley Harms (4) 89.94 5–1 Scott Mitchell 78.40

Wesley Harms (4) 82.86 5–2 Jan Dekker 81.56

Group E

Pos	Name	P	W	L	LF	LA	+/−	Pts
1	(Scotland) Ross Montgomery	2	2	0	10	5	+5	4
2	(Netherlands) Yordi Meeuwisse	2	1	1	7	9	−2	2
3	(England) Robbie Green (3)	2	0	2	7	10	−3	0

Ross Montgomery 82.40 5–2 Yordi Meeuwisse 74.40

Yordi Meeuwisse 94.81 5–4 Robbie Green (3) 89.09

Ross Montgomery 86.93 5–3 Robbie Green (3) 88.27

Group F

Pos	Name	P	W	L	LF	LA	+/−	Pts
1	(England) Gary Robson	2	2	0	10	4	+6	4
2	(England) Alan Norris (6)	2	1	1	8	7	+1	2
3	(Netherlands) Jeffrey de Zwaan	2	0	2	3	10	−7	0

Gary Robson 83.79 5–1 Jeffrey de Zwaan 77.44

Alan Norris (6) 90.82 5–2 Jeffrey de Zwaan 85.92

Gary Robson 80.24 5–3 Alan Norris 82.86

Group G

Pos	Name	P	W	L	LF	LA	+/−	Pts
1	(England) Tony O'Shea (7)	2	2	0	10	4	+6	4
2	(Netherlands) Danny Noppert	2	1	1	8	9	−1	2
3	(England) Darryl Fitton	2	0	2	5	10	−5	0

Danny Noppert 92.42 5–4 Darryl Fitton 94.21

Tony O'Shea (7) 93.69 5–1 Darryl Fitton 89.28

Tony O'Shea (7) 90.78 5–3 Danny Noppert 90.45

Group H

Pos	Name	P	W	L	LF	LA	+/−	Pts
1	(England) James Wilson	2	2	0	10	4	+6	4
2	(Belgium) Geert De Vos (2)	2	1	1	7	7	0	2
3	(Netherlands) Rick Hofstra	2	0	2	4	10	−6	0

James Wilson 102.09 5–2 Rick Hofstra 94.56

Geert De Vos (2) 90.18 5–2 Rick Hofstra 80.49

James Wilson 95.86 5–2 Geert De Vos 92.94

==== Knockout stages ====
Quarter-finals; Best of 5 sets
1	(England) Stephen Bunting 94.52	3
8	(Netherlands) Benito van de Pas 77.06	0
4	(Netherlands) Wesley Harms 84.88	3
(Netherlands) Michel van der Horst 75.49	0
(Scotland) Ross Montgomery 78.64	3
(England) Gary Robson 79.86	2
(England) James Wilson 92.40	3
7	(England) Tony O'Shea 90.11	1

Semi-finals; Best of 5 sets
1	(England) Stephen Bunting 88.09	3
4	(Netherlands) Wesley Harms 83.80	2
(Scotland) Ross Montgomery 87.51	0
(England) James Wilson 94.11	3

Final; Best of 9 sets
1	(England) Stephen Bunting 88.45	1
(England) James Wilson 91.10	5

=== Women's tournament ===
==== Group stage ====
All matches best of 7 legs. Two points are gained for every match won.
P = Played; W = Won; L = Lost; LF = Legs for; LA = Legs against; +/− = Leg difference; Pts = Points

Group A

Pos	Name	P	W	L	LF	LA	+/−	Pts
1	(Netherlands) (1) Aileen de Graaf	2	1	1	7	6	+1	2
2	(England) Trina Gulliver	2	1	1	6	5	+1	2
3	(Netherlands) Sharon Prins	2	1	1	5	7	−2	2

Group B

Pos	Name	P	W	L	LF	LA	+/−	Pts
1	(Russia) Anastasia Dobromyslova	2	2	0	8	3	+5	6
2	(England) (2) Deta Hedman	2	1	0	6	5	+1	2
3	(Netherlands) Rilana Erades	2	0	2	2	8	−6	0

==== Final ====
Best of 3 sets.

(Netherlands) (1) Aileen de Graaf (74.34) 2–0 (Russia) (2) Anastasia Dobromyslova (73.74)
