= 2012 Zuiderduin Masters =

Zuiderduin Masters

Tournament information
- Dates: 7 December 2012 – 9 December 2012
- Venue: Hotel Zuiderduin
- Location: Egmond aan Zee
- Country: North Holland, the Netherlands
- Organisation(s): BDO / WDF
- Format: Men; Legs (group stage); Sets (from Quarter-finals); Final – best of 9 Sets; Women; Legs (group stage); Sets (Final); Final – best of 3 Sets
- High checkout: 170 (England) Alan Norris

Champion(s)
- (England) Stephen Bunting (men) (Russia) Anastasia Dobromyslova (women)

The 2012 Zuiderduin Masters was a BDO/WDF darts tournament that took place in Egmond aan Zee, Netherlands.

Stephen Bunting won the tournament for the first time beating Alan Norris in the final.

== Qualifying ==
The players in bold are the seeded players for the group stages. The players in italics qualified through more than one method.

=== Men ===
Qualifying Criteria		Player	Ref
2011-12 Zuiderduin Masters; Rankings – Top 16	1	(England) **Alan Norris**	
2011-12 Zuiderduin Masters; Rankings – Top 16	2	(England) **Stephen Bunting**	
2011-12 Zuiderduin Masters; Rankings – Top 16	3	(England) **Tony O'Shea**	
2011-12 Zuiderduin Masters; Rankings – Top 16	4	(England) **Steve Douglas**	
2011-12 Zuiderduin Masters; Rankings – Top 16	5	(Netherlands) **Jan Dekker**	
2011-12 Zuiderduin Masters; Rankings – Top 16	6	(England) **Scott Mitchell**	
2011-12 Zuiderduin Masters; Rankings – Top 16	7	(Netherlands) **Wesley Harms**	
2011-12 Zuiderduin Masters; Rankings – Top 16	8	(Netherlands) **Benito van de Pas**	
2011-12 Zuiderduin Masters; Rankings – Top 16	9	(England) Robbie Green	
2011-12 Zuiderduin Masters; Rankings – Top 16	10	(Belgium) Geert De Vos	
2011-12 Zuiderduin Masters; Rankings – Top 16	11	(Scotland) Ross Montgomery	
2011-12 Zuiderduin Masters; Rankings – Top 16	12	(England) Martin Adams	
2011-12 Zuiderduin Masters; Rankings – Top 16	13	(Netherlands) Christian Kist	
2011-12 Zuiderduin Masters; Rankings – Top 16	14	(England) James Wilson	
2011-12 Zuiderduin Masters; Rankings – Top 16	15	(England) Darryl Fitton	
2011-12 Zuiderduin Masters; Rankings – Top 16	16	(Netherlands) Bryan de Hoog	
2012 MariFlex Open winner		(England) Martin Adams	
2012 NDB Champions League of Darts winner		(Netherlands) Dennie Bos	
2012 NDB Selection winner		(Netherlands) Rick Hofstra	
2012 NDB Rankings winner		(Netherlands) Remco van Eijden	
Wildcards		(England) John Walton	
Wildcards		(Netherlands) Jimmy Hendriks	
Wildcards		(Netherlands) Jeffrey de Graaf	
Wildcards		(England) Richie George	
Wildcards		(Netherlands) Michel van der Horst	
Notes; Martin Adams qualified through Zuiderduin Masters Rankings and won 2012; MariFlex Open so an extra wild card was awarded. John Walton actually finished 17th on the Zuiderduin Masters Rankings.

=== Women ===
Qualifying Criteria		Player	Ref
2011-12 Zuiderduin Masters; Rankings – Top 2	1	(Russia) **Irina Armstrong**	
2011-12 Zuiderduin Masters; Rankings – Top 2	2	(England) **Deta Hedman**	
2012 MariFlex Open winner		(England) **Deta Hedman**	
2012 NDB Champions League of Darts winner		(Netherlands) Aileen de Graaf	
Wildcards		(Russia) Anastasia Dobromyslova	
Wildcards		(England) Lorraine Farlam	
Wildcards		(Netherlands) Sharon Prins	
Notes; Deta Hedman finished 2nd on Zuiderduin Masters Rankings and won 2012 MariFlex; Open so an extra wildcard was awarded.

== Results ==
=== Men's tournament ===
==== Group stage ====
All matches best of 9 legs. Two points are gained for every match won.
P = Played; W = Won; L = Lost; LF = Legs for; LA = Legs against; +/− = Leg difference; Pts = Points

Group A

Pos	Name	P	W	L	LF	LA	+/−	Pts
1	(England) Alan Norris (1)	2	2	0	10	5	+5	4
2	(Netherlands) Dennie Bos	2	1	1	9	7	+2	2
3	(Netherlands) Jimmy Hendriks	2	0	2	3	10	−7	0

Dennie Bos 5–1 Jimmy Hendriks

Alan Norris (1) 5–1 Jimmy Hendriks

Alan Norris (1) 5–0 Dennie Bos

Group B

Pos	Name	P	W	L	LF	LA	+/−	Pts
1	(Netherlands) Rick Hofstra	2	2	0	10	5	+5	4
2	(Netherlands) Benito van de Pas (8)	2	1	1	8	8	0	2
3	(England) James Wilson	2	0	2	5	10	−5	0

James Wilson 5–3 Rick Hofstra

Rick Hofstra 5–2 Benito van de Pas (8)

Benito van de Pas (8) 5–1 James Wilson

Group C

Pos	Name	P	W	L	LF	LA	+/−	Pts
1	(Netherlands) Jeffrey de Graaf	2	2	0	10	6	+4	4
2	(England) Richie George	2	1	1	7	6	+1	2
3	(Netherlands) Jan Dekker (5)	2	0	2	5	10	−5	0

Jeffrey de Graaf 5–1 Richie George

Richie George 5–4 Jan Dekker (5)

Jeffrey de Graaf 5–1 Jan Dekker (5)

Group D

Pos	Name	P	W	L	LF	LA	+/−	Pts
1	(Scotland) Ross Montgomery	2	2	0	10	5	+5	4
2	(England) Steve Douglas (4)	2	1	1	9	8	+1	2
3	(England) John Walton	2	0	0	4	10	−6	0

Ross Montgomery 5–3 John Walton

Steve Douglas (4) 5–3 John Walton

Ross Montgomery 5–4 Steve Douglas (4)

Group E

Pos	Name	P	W	L	LF	LA	+/−	Pts
1	(England) Tony O'Shea (3)	2	2	0	10	5	+5	4
2	(England) Robbie Green	2	1	1	7	9	−2	2
3	(England) Darryl Fitton	2	0	2	7	10	−3	0

Robbie Green 5–3 Darryl Fitton

Tony O'Shea (3) 5–0 Darryl Fitton

Tony O'Shea (3) 5–3 Robbie Green

Group F

Pos	Name	P	W	L	LF	LA	+/−	Pts
1	(England) Scott Mitchell (6)	2	2	0	10	4	+6	4
2	(Netherlands) Bryan de Hoog	2	1	1	8	7	+1	2
3	(Netherlands) Michel van der Horst	2	0	2	3	10	−7	0

Bryan de Hoog 5–0 Michel van der Horst

Michel van der Horst 5–3 Scott Mitchell (6)

Scott Mitchell (6) 5–1 Bryan de Hoog

Group G

Pos	Name	P	W	L	LF	LA	+/−	Pts
1	(Netherlands) Remco van Eijden	2	2	0	10	4	+6	4
2	(Netherlands) Wesley Harms (7)	2	1	1	8	9	−1	2
3	(Netherlands) Christian Kist	2	0	2	5	10	−5	0

Remco van Eijden 5–2 Christian Kist

Wesley Harms (7) 5–3 Christian Kist

Remco van Eijden 5–4 Wesley Harms (7)

Group H

Pos	Name	P	W	L	LF	LA	+/−	Pts
1	(England) Stephen Bunting (2)	2	2	0	10	4	+6	4
2	(Belgium) Geert De Vos	2	1	1	7	7	0	2
3	(England) Martin Adams	2	0	2	4	10	−6	0

Geert De Vos 5–3 Martin Adams

Stephen Bunting (2) 5–3 Martin Adams

Stephen Bunting (2) 5–2 Geert De Vos

==== Knockout stages ====
Quarter-finals; Best of 5 sets
2	(England) Stephen Bunting	3
(Netherlands) Remco van Eijden	0
6	(England) Scott Mitchell	3
(England) Tony O'Shea	1
1	(England) Alan Norris	3
(Netherlands) Rick Hofstra	1
(Scotland) Ross Montgomery	3
(Netherlands) Jeffrey de Graaf	2

Semi-finals; Best of 5 sets
2	(England) Stephen Bunting	3
6	(England) Scott Mitchell	1
1	(England) Alan Norris	3
(Scotland) Ross Montgomery	0

Final; Best of 9 sets
2	(England) Stephen Bunting	5
1	(England) Alan Norris	0

=== Women's tournament ===
==== Group stage ====
All matches best of 7 legs. Two points are gained for every match won.
P = Played; W = Won; L = Lost; LF = Legs for; LA = Legs against; +/− = Leg difference; Pts = Points

Group A

Pos	Name	P	W	L	LF	LA	+/−	Pts
1	(Netherlands) Aileen de Graaf	2	2	0	8	1	+7	4
2	(England) Lorraine Farlam	2	1	1	4	5	−1	2
3	(Netherlands) (1) Irina Armstrong	2	0	2	2	8	−6	0

Aileen de Graaf 4–0 Lorraine Farlam

Lorraine Farlam 4–1 Irina Armstrong (1)

Aileen de Graaf 4–1 Irina Armstrong (1)

Group B

Pos	Name	P	W	L	LF	LA	+/−	Pts
1	(Russia) Anastasia Dobromyslova	2	2	0	8	2	+6	4
2	(England) Sharon Prins	2	1	1	5	6	−1	2
3	(Netherlands) (2) Deta Hedman	2	0	2	3	8	−5	0

Anastasia Dobromyslova 4–1 Sharon Prins

Sharon Prins 4–2 Deta Hedman (2)

Anastasia Dobromyslova 4–1 Deta Hedman (2)

==== Final ====
Best of 3 sets.

(Netherlands) Aileen de Graaf (84.69) 1–2 (Russia) Anastasia Dobromyslova (74.34)
