= 2015 BDO World Darts Championship =

Tournament information
- Dates: 3–11 January 2015
- Venue: Lakeside Country Club
- Location: Frimley Green, Surrey
- Country: England, United Kingdom
- Organisation(s): BDO
- Format: Sets
- Prize fund: £339,000 (total)
- Winner's share: £100,000 (men) £12,000 (women) £5,000 (youth)
- High checkout: 167 (Lithuania) Darius Labanauskas

Champion(s)
- (England) Scott Mitchell (men) (England) Lisa Ashton (women) (Netherlands) Colin Roelofs (youth)

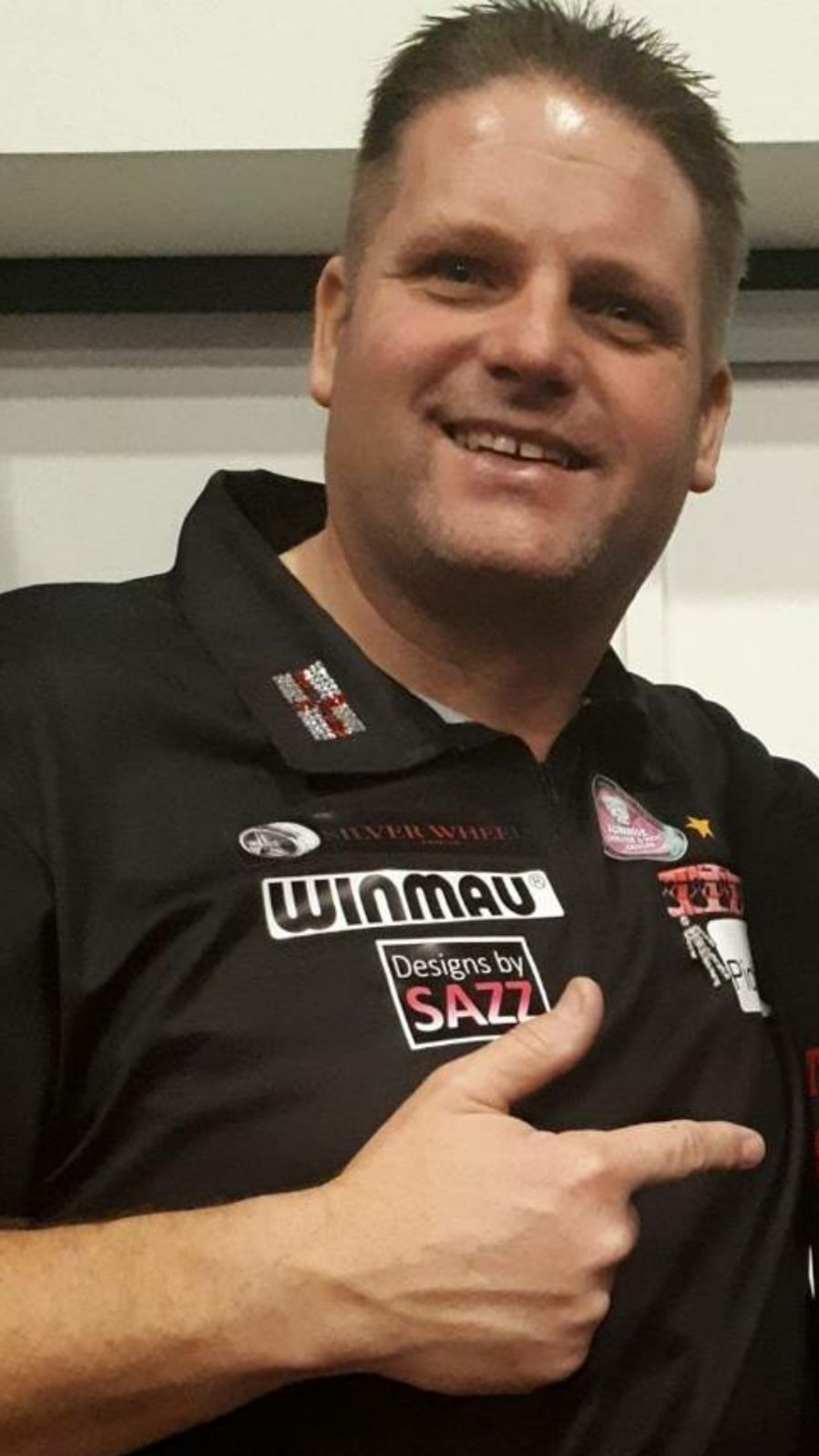
2015 Men's Winner Scott Mitchell

The 2015 BDO World Darts Championship (known for sponsorship reasons as the 2015 Lakeside World Professional Darts Championship) was the 38th World Championship organised by the British Darts Organisation, and the 30th staging at the Lakeside Country Club at Frimley Green. 2014 BDO champion Stephen Bunting did not defend his title, as he switched to the rival PDC organisation at the start of the season. Scott Mitchell beat Martin Adams 7–6 in the final for his first world title.

For the first time since 1992 no player from the Netherlands reached the last 16.

== Format and qualifiers ==
=== Men's ===
Top 16
1. (England) James Wilson (first round)
2. (England) Alan Norris (second round)
3. (England) Martin Adams (runner-up)
4. (England) Scott Mitchell (winner)
5. (Wales) Martin Phillips (first round)
6. (England) Scott Waites (second round)
7. (England) Glen Durrant (semi-final)
8. (Netherlands) Wesley Harms (first round)
9. (England) Gary Robson (second round)
10. (England) Jamie Hughes (second round)
11. (Scotland) Ross Montgomery (quarter-final)
12. (Netherlands) Jeffrey de Graaf (first round)
13. (Netherlands) Remco van Eijden (first round)
14. (Netherlands) Rick Hofstra (first round)
15. (England) Darryl Fitton (quarter-final)
16. (England) Robbie Green (quarter-final)

17-28 in BDO Rankings

17. (Latvia) Madars Razma (second round)
18. (Netherlands) Jan Dekker (first round)
19. (Lithuania) Darius Labanauskas (first round)
20. (Belgium) Geert De Vos (second round)
21. (England) Pip Blackwell (first round)
22. (England) Tony O'Shea (first round)
23. (England) Paul Jennings (first round)
24. (England) Sam Hewson (first round)
25. (Scotland) Paul Coughlin (preliminary round)
26. (England) Sam Head (preliminary round)
27. (England) Brian Dawson (quarter-final)
28. (Netherlands) Michel van der Horst (first round)

Hull qualifiers
1. (England) Rhys Hayden (preliminary round)
2. (Sweden) Daniel Larsson (first round)
3. (Belgium) Cedric Waegemans (first round)
4. (Canada) Jeff Smith (semi-final)

WDF regional qualifiers
1. (Australia) Eddy Sims (preliminary round)
2. (Sweden) Peter Sajwani (second round)
3. (Canada) David Cameron (preliminary round)
4. (Czech Republic) Karel Sedláček (first round)
5. (New Zealand) Mike Day (preliminary round)
6. (United States) Jim Widmayer (second round)
7. (Netherlands) Willem Mandigers (preliminary round)
8. (Japan) Seigo Asada (preliminary round)

=== Women's ===
The televised stages feature 16 players. The top 8 players in the BDO rankings over the 2013/14 season are seeded for the tournament.

Top 8

1. (England) Deta Hedman (first round)
2. (Russia) Anastasia Dobromyslova (semi-final)
3. (Netherlands) Aileen de Graaf (quarter-finals)
4. (England) Lorraine Winstanley (first round)
5. (England) Rachel Brooks (quarter-finals)
6. (England) Fallon Sherrock (runner-up)
7. (England) Zoe Jones (quarter-finals)
8. (England) Trina Gulliver (quarter-finals)

Other qualifiers

1. (England) Lisa Ashton (winner)
2. (Netherlands) Sharon Prins (semi-final)
3. (Germany) Irina Armstrong (first round)
4. (England) Casey Gallagher (first round)
5. (Netherlands) Anneke Kuijten (first round)
6. (England) Paula Jacklin (first round)

Hull qualifiers

1. (Canada) Maria Mason (first round)
2. (England) Sarah Brent (first round)

=== Youth ===
For the first time a youth tournament was played. The final stages at Lakeside though just consisted of a best of five sets final between Harry Ward and Colin Roelofs. Over 64 players have played down to the final in October 2014. Roelofs won the title, 3–0 in sets.

== Prize money ==
The total prize money was £339,000. Additionally there was a £52,000 prize for a nine dart finish.

Position	Men	Women	Youth
Champion	£100,000	£12,000	£5,000
Runner-up	£35,000	£5,000	£2,000
Semi-finalists	£15,000	£2,000	£1,000
Quarter-finalists:	£6,500	£1,000	£250
Last 16	£4,500	£500	n/a
1st round losers	£3,250	n/a	n/a
Preliminary round losers	£2,000	n/a	n/a
Highest Checkout	£5,000	n/a	n/a
Total	£300,000	£29,000	£10,000

== Representation from different countries ==
This table shows the number of players in the Men's World Championship, the total number including Preliminary round.

Number of players by country^{*}
	(England) ENG	(Netherlands) NED	(Latvia) LAT	(United States) USA	(Australia) AUS	(Belgium) BEL	(Canada) CAN	(Czech Republic) CZE	(New Zealand) NZL	(Scotland) SCO	(Lithuania) LIT	(Wales) WAL	(Sweden) SWE	(Japan) JPN	Total
Final	2	0	0	0	0	0	0	0	0	0	0	0	0	0	2
Semis	3	0	0	0	0	0	1	0	0	0	0	0	0	0	4
Quarters	6	0	0	0	0	0	1	0	0	1	0	0	0	0	8
Round 2	10	0	1	1	0	1	1	0	0	1	0	0	1	0	16
Round 1	15	6	1	1	0	2	1	1	0	1	1	1	2	0	32
Prelim.	3	2	0	1	1	1	2	1	1	1	0	0	2	1	16
Total	17	7	1	1	1	2	2	1	1	2	1	1	2	1	40

^{*} In darts, as in many other sports, some non-sovereign sub-national entities of the United Kingdom are treated as separate countries for sport governance purposes.

== Draw ==
The draw was held on 12 October 2014.

=== Men ===
==== Preliminary round ====
To be played from 3–5 January. All matches are the best of 5 sets.

Av.	Player	Score	Player	Av.
73.62	Peter Sajwani (Sweden) (Q)	3–0	(England) Sam Head	69.48
82.44	David Cameron (Canada) (Q)	2–3	(Netherlands) Michel van der Horst	82.08
71.97	Eddy Sims (Australia) (Q)	1–3	(Belgium) Cedric Waegemans (Q)	75.39
75.36	Seigo Asada (Japan) (Q)	1–3	(England) Brian Dawson	84.90
82.74	Karel Sedláček (Czech Republic) (Q)	3–2	(Scotland) Paul Coughlin	75.72
84.51	Mike Day (New Zealand) (Q)	0–3	(Canada) Jeff Smith (Q)	86.10
76.14	Jim Widmayer (United States) (Q)	3–2	(England) Rhys Hayden (Q)	71.28
80.04	Willem Mandigers (Netherlands) (Q)	1–3	(Sweden) Daniel Larsson (Q)	80.67

==== Last 32 ====
First Round (best of 5 sets); 3–6 January
1	(England) James Wilson 87.90	1
Q	(Sweden) Peter Sajwani 85.62	3
16	(England) Robbie Green 91.65	3
(Lithuania) Darius Labanauskas 88.71	1
8	(Netherlands) Wesley Harms 89.16	1
Q	(Canada) Jeff Smith 89.92	3
9	(England) Gary Robson 82.95	3
Q	(Belgium) Cedric Waegemans 72.33	0
5	(Wales) Martin Phillips 83.31	0
(Latvia) Madars Razma 86.70	3
12	(Netherlands) Jeffrey de Graaf 73.89	0
(England) Brian Dawson 85.35	3
4	(England) Scott Mitchell 92.55	3
(England) Tony O'Shea 91.02	2
13	(Netherlands) Remco van Eijden 83.85	1
(Belgium) Geert De Vos 93.21	3
2	(England) Alan Norris 87.36	3
Q	(Sweden) Daniel Larsson 87.24	2
15	(England) Darryl Fitton 88.05	3
(England) Paul Jennings 81.06	0
7	(England) Glen Durrant 96.21	3
Q	(Czech Republic) Karel Sedláček 99.57	1
10	(England) Jamie Hughes 86.70	3
(Netherlands) Michel van der Horst 83.64	1
6	(England) Scott Waites 90.45	3
(England) Sam Hewson 80.43	2
11	(Scotland) Ross Montgomery 89.64	3
(England) Pip Blackwell 92.70	1
3	(England) Martin Adams 94.11	3
(Netherlands) Jan Dekker 92.31	1
14	(Netherlands) Rick Hofstra 81.54	1
Q	(United States) Jim Widmayer 82.47	3

Second Round (best of 7 sets); 7–8 January
Q	(Sweden) Peter Sajwani 84.00	0
16	(England) Robbie Green 98.22	4
Q	(Canada) Jeff Smith 91.23	4
9	(England) Gary Robson 87.90	3
(Latvia) Madars Razma 83.76	3
(England) Brian Dawson 85.29	4
4	(England) Scott Mitchell 93.12	4
(Belgium) Geert De Vos 88.86	2
2	(England) Alan Norris 95.82	3
15	(England) Darryl Fitton 94.32	4
7	(England) Glen Durrant 98.05	4
10	(England) Jamie Hughes 90.91	1
6	(England) Scott Waites 94.08	0
11	(Scotland) Ross Montgomery 97.29	4
3	(England) Martin Adams 89.37	4
Q	(United States) Jim Widmayer 78.51	0

Quarter-finals (best of 9 sets); 9 January
16	(England) Robbie Green 90.69	1
Q	(Canada) Jeff Smith 90.96	5
(England) Brian Dawson 91.92	2
4	(England) Scott Mitchell 96.00	5
15	(England) Darryl Fitton 90.75	2
7	(England) Glen Durrant 95.55	5
11	(Scotland) Ross Montgomery 86.94	1
3	(England) Martin Adams 93.84	5

Semi-finals (best of 11 sets); 10 January
Q	(Canada) Jeff Smith 86.88	0
4	(England) Scott Mitchell 93.27	6
7	(England) Glen Durrant 99.87	5
3	(England) Martin Adams 97.92	6

Final (best of 13 sets); 11 January
4	(England) Scott Mitchell 92.61	7
3	(England) Martin Adams 92.55	6

== Women ==
In a repeat of last year's final Lisa Ashton beat Deta Hedman in the first round. She defended her title by winning the final 3–1 over Fallon Sherrock and became the tournament's oldest winner with 44 years of age. Also in the final, Fallon Sherrock set a competition record by throwing six 180s in a match and 13 180s in the tournament.

First Round (best of 3 sets); 3–7 January
1	(England) Deta Hedman 72.51	1	3	0
(England) Lisa Ashton 81.72	3	1	3
8	(England) Trina Gulliver 66.30	3	3
(Netherlands) Anneke Kuijten 48.63	0	0
4	(England) Lorraine Winstanley 67.11	0	1
(Netherlands) Sharon Prins 72.66	3	3
5	(England) Rachel Brooks 76.95	3	3
(England) Casey Gallagher 72.15	2	2
2	(Russia) Anastasia Dobromyslova 72.42	3	3
(Germany) Irina Armstrong 74.97	2	1
7	(England) Zoe Jones 61.50	3	3
Q	(England) Sarah Brent 51.72	1	0
3	(Netherlands) Aileen de Graaf 70.68	3	3
(England) Paula Jacklin 58.95	1	1
6	(England) Fallon Sherrock 75.60	3	1	3
Q	(Canada) Maria Mason 71.94	0	3	1

Quarter-finals (best of 3 sets); 8 January
(England) Lisa Ashton 90.18	3	3
8	(England) Trina Gulliver 56.58	0	0
(Netherlands) Sharon Prins 68.49	1	3	3
5	(England) Rachel Brooks 65.88	3	2	1
2	(Russia) Anastasia Dobromyslova 75.87	3	3
7	(England) Zoe Jones 69.60	0	1
3	(Netherlands) Aileen de Graaf 73.68	3	2	2
6	(England) Fallon Sherrock 75.84	1	3	3

Semi-finals (best of 3 sets); 9 January
(England) Lisa Ashton 87.30	3	3
(Netherlands) Sharon Prins 71.37	1	1
2	(Russia) Anastasia Dobromyslova 80.46	2	3	1
6	(England) Fallon Sherrock 84.75	3	1	3

Final (best of 5 sets); 10 January
(England) Lisa Ashton 83.22	3	3	0	3
6	(England) Fallon Sherrock 83.76	1	2	3	1

== Media coverage ==
Following exclusive coverage on the BBC in 2014, BBC & BT Sport shared broadcasting duties of the 2015 edition for the first time. The BBC had previously shared coverage of the tournament with ESPN from 2012 to 2013. The BBC had exclusive live coverage of every afternoon session, the first men's semi final and the women's final, while BT had exclusive coverage of every evening session and the second men's semi final, with both broadcasters sharing coverage of the final. In addition, the BBC broadcast late night highlights.

The BBC live coverage was hosted by Colin Murray alongside Bobby George; Rob Walker was a reporter and host the late night highlights show. Ray Stubbs returned to the host for BT Sport, having previously hosted BBC coverage between 2001 and 2009 and ESPN coverage between 2012 and 2013, with Ted Hankey alongside him, while Helen Skelton was the BT Sport reporter. Commentary was provided by Tony Green, Vassos Alexander, John Rawling, Jim Proudfoot and George Riley.
