= Alan Norris (darts player) =

English darts player (born 1972)

Personal information
- Nickname: "Chuck"
- Born: 21 February 1972 (age 54) Yeovil, England
- Home town: Southam, England

Sport
- Sport: Darts
- Playing since: 1981
- Darts: Target Alan Norris Darts 22g Tungsten Darts
- Laterality: Right-handed
- Walk-on music: "Can't Take My Eyes Off You" by Andy Williams

Organisation (see split in darts)
- BDO: 2006–2015
- PDC: 2015–present (Tour Card: 2015–2019)

WDF major events – best performances
- World Championship: Runner-up: 2014
- World Masters: Quarter-final: 2014
- World Trophy: Quarter-final: 2014
- Finder Masters: Runner-up: 2012

PDC premier events – best performances
- World Championship: Quarter-final: 2016
- World Matchplay: Quarter-final: 2017
- World Grand Prix: Last 16: 2016, 2017
- UK Open: Semi-final: 2017
- Grand Slam: Last 16: 2014
- European Championship: Last 16: 2017
- PC Finals: Last 16: 2015, 2016
- Masters: Last 16: 2018

Other tournament wins
- Years
British Classic	2014
Catalonian Open	2014
Denmark Open	2014
England Open Early Bird	2011
French Open	2010, 2011
Luxembourg Open	2011, 2012
Polish Open	2014
Scottish Classic	2014
Sweden National Championship	2007
Swedish Open	2014
Wales Masters	2012
European Tour Events (×1)
German Darts Championship	2016
Players Championships (×2)
2015, 2017

Other achievements
- 2015 Best PDC Newcomer; 2016 Nine-dart finish at the 2016 Players Championship Finals

Alan Norris (born 21 February 1972) is an English darts player. He was the runner-up at the 2014 BDO World Darts Championship and also lost in the final of the 2012 Zuiderduin Masters, with Stephen Bunting prevailing on both occasions. In 2015, he switched to the PDC and, after reaching the quarter-finals of the 2016 World Championship, he was named the PDC Best Newcomer of the year.

== BDO career ==
Norris won the 2007 Sweden National Championships, beating Daniel Larsson in the final. He had earlier reached the semi-finals of the Finnish Open. Norris then narrowly missed out qualifying for the last 16 of the 2007 Winmau World Masters, having beaten Michael Rosenauer, Mitchell Crooks and Daniel Brouwer before losing to Jordy Terburg. A quarter-final defeat in the Swedish Open followed.

Norris made his televised debut by reaching the quarter-finals of the 2008 Welsh Open, which was shown live on Setanta Sports. He defeated Martin Adams in the earlier rounds and then went on to beat Ian Jones, before losing to eventual winner Gary Anderson in the semi-finals. He then reached the quarter-finals of the Norway Open, Denmark Open and the Zuiderduin Masters and also reached the semi-finals of the Welsh Classic and the Swedish Open.

Norris made his World Championship debut in 2009, taking one of the automatic non-seeded spots. He defeated 13th seed Steve West 3–0 in the first round but lost 4–0 to fourth seed Scott Waites in the second round. He was defeated in the final of the Welsh Classic 5–2 by Tony O'Shea. Norris advanced through Group B at the Zuiderduin Masters and then eliminated Martin Atkins 3–1 to play in his first major semi-final where Darryl Fitton whitewashed him 4–0.

Norris returned as the eighth seed at the 2010 World Championship, but lost 3–2 to Robert Wagner in the first round despite averaging 90 compared to Wagner's 86. He had a mixed 2010 season, in which he won the French Open by beating Kim Huybrechts and also got to the semi-finals of the European Open in Airdrie. Norris attempted to qualify for the UK Open but fell in the last 64 to Ryan Murray.

In the first round of the 2011 World Championship, Norris beat seventh seed Ross Montgomery 3–1, but was beaten in the second round by 10th seed Garry Thompson. He edged out Dean Winstanley 6–5 to win the England Open Early Bird and retained his French Open title by defeating Garry Thompson 5–3. Norris also claimed the Luxembourg Open after beating Christian Kist 6–4.

Norris played in his fourth successive World Championship in 2012 and once again won his first round match, this time against 14th seed Benito van de Pas 3–2. In the second round, he recovered from 3–1 down against third seed Dean Winstanley to win 4–3 and reach his first World Championship quarter-final, where he was beaten 5–1 by eventual champion Christian Kist. Norris had a shot at double 12 for a nine-dart finish, which would have been only the second in the history of the tournament, but missed the shot and ended up losing the leg. He won the Welsh Masters and the Luxembourg Open for the second year in a row. In December, Norris reached the final of the Zuiderduin Masters, a run that included a 112 three-dart average in his final group match as well as two 170 checkouts. However, he was eventually beaten 5–0 by BDO number one Stephen Bunting in the final.

Norris was then the number nine seed for the 2013 World Championship. He beat Welshman Wayne Warren in the first round 3–1, however, was beaten in a tightly contested second-round game, losing 4–3 to eighth seeded Dutchman, Wesley Harms.

=== World Championship final ===
After a slow season, Norris entered the 2014 World Championship as an unseeded player and was drawn against defending champion Scott Waites in the first round. Norris won the match 3–0 averaging over 93 and with a checkout success of almost 50%. He followed this up with another clinical performance in a 4–1 win over Glen Durrant, before beating James Wilson 5–2 in a match described by commentators as one of the best in Lakeside history due to its consistently high scoring. In the semi-finals, Norris trailed Jan Dekker 4–2 after missing three darts to lead 3–1, but eventually won the match 6–5 after Dekker himself missed set darts in the ninth set that would have seen him lead 5–4. Both players hit a number of crucial finishes, most notably Dekker hitting a 158 checkout to hold his throw in the deciding set which would otherwise have seen Norris throw for the match, and the game was cited as the best in that year's tournament by Bobby George among others. Norris played world number one Stephen Bunting in the final and kept the match tight in the first session, entering the interval at 3–3 in sets having seen Bunting miss darts to win two of the sets Norris won. In the seventh set, Norris missed one dart at double four to lead 4–3 having also earlier thrown for the set, then missed darts at doubles in the first two legs of the eighth as Bunting moved into a 6–3 lead. Norris hit back by winning the tenth set courtesy of a 140 checkout, the highest of the match and also Norris's highest of the tournament. Then, as Bunting threw for the title at 2–0 in the 11th set and left himself on 28 for the match, Norris hit a 113 checkout to stay alive. However, Bunting subsequently broke Norris's throw and won the championship. Norris received £35,000 for reaching the final.

The rest of the year proved to be Norris' most successful as he won the Denmark Open, Polish Open, British Classic, Swedish Open, Scottish Classic and Catalan Open. His appearance in the World Championship final earned him a debut at the Grand Slam of Darts where he topped Group B by beating Ronny Huybrechts and Terry Jenkins. In the last 16 Kim Huybrechts knocked Norris out 10–5.

== PDC career ==
After the culmination of the 2015 BDO World Championship, where Norris lost to Darryl Fitton in the second round after missing three match darts, Norris confirmed his intention to enter the PDC's Q School, ending a nine-year stint with the BDO. He stated that "I've done the BDO circuit for a long time and nothing seems to be changing quickly enough. I'm not getting any younger, so it's the right time to give the PDC a go. I've spoken to them (BDO Events) on a number of occasions and they haven't been able to give me straight answers, there's nothing on paper in terms of new events and so on. It's the same story every year and sometimes a change is as good as a rest, so I'm going to give it a go with PDC". Norris won a Tour Card on the first day of the event by beating Carl Abbiss 5–3 in the final qualifying round. He also threw a nine-dart finish earlier in the day during his fifth round victory over Jason Lovett. Norris' first quarter-final appearance in the PDC came at the final UK Open Qualifier in February where he lost 6–1 to Phil Taylor. He entered the UK Open itself in the third round stage and lost 9–6 to Kyle Anderson.

In October, Norris claimed his first PDC title at the 18th Players Championship event by defeating Kim Huybrechts 6–1 in the final with an average of 108.06. He lost 6–3 to Peter Wright in the first round of the European Championship and beat Terry Jenkins 6–3 at the 2015 Players Championship Finals, but was then thrashed 10–3 by Adrian Lewis in the second round.

Norris finished as the highest non-qualified player on the Pro Tour Order of Merit for the 2016 World Championship and on his debut in the event he knocked out sixth seed Robert Thornton 3–0 in sets. His form continued as he scored 11 180s in a 4–1 win over Joe Murnan to meet Mark Webster in the third round, who he also defeated 4–1. Norris moved 3–1 up on Jelle Klaasen in the quarter-finals, before being pegged back to 3–3. He won the next set and then missed a dart at double 12 for a nine-dart finish. Norris threw for the match but would ultimately be defeated 5–4, losing the final five legs of the match. He was ranked 37th on the Order of Merit afterwards, the highest of 2015's Q School graduates and was named best newcomer at the PDC Annual Awards Dinner. Norris lost 6–4 in the final of the second UK Open Qualifier to Michael van Gerwen. He reached the fourth round of the main event, but lost 9–6 to Joe Cullen. Norris qualified for his first World Matchplay and won the opening leg against Gary Anderson, but was defeated 10–1. On his World Grand Prix debut he overcame Michael Smith 2–1 and was a leg away from knocking out Simon Whitlock in a deciding set, before the Australian won the match.

Norris won his first European Tour title by narrowly defeating Jelle Klaasen 6–5 in the final of the German Darts Championship. The win gave him entry into the Grand Slam of Darts, but he failed to win any of his games to finish bottom of the group. Norris earned £35,000 for throwing a nine-dart finish in his first round win over Michael Smith at the Players Championship Finals. He reached the third round, where he lost 10–5 to Darren Webster.

In the first round of the 2017 World Championship, Norris overturned a 2–0 deficit against John Michael to win 3–2. He lost the first 10 legs in the second round against Raymond van Barneveld and would lose 4–0. Norris was ranked 18th on the Order of Merit after the event. Norris won his third PDC title by overcoming Peter Jacques 6–1 in the first Players Championship. He got to the quarter-finals of the 2017 UK Open with a 10–6 win over Michael Smith and survived two match darts from Kim Huybrechts to progress to the semi-finals 10–9. In another close match Norris was level with Gerwyn Price at 9–9 and missed three darts to take the 19th leg. Price won it by taking out 100 with two double tops and then broke Norris in the next leg to inflict an 11–9 defeat on him.

== World Championship results ==
=== BDO ===
- 2009: Second round (lost to Scott Waites 0–4)
- 2010: First round (lost to Robert Wagner 2–3)
- 2011: Second round (lost to Garry Thompson 2–4)
- 2012: Quarter-finals (lost to Christian Kist 1–5)
- 2013: Second round (lost to Wesley Harms 3–4)
- 2014: Runner-up (lost to Stephen Bunting 4–7)
- 2015: Second round (lost to Darryl Fitton 3–4)

=== PDC ===
- 2016: Quarter-finals (lost to Jelle Klaasen 4–5)
- 2017: Second round (lost to Raymond van Barneveld 0–4)
- 2018: Second round (lost to James Richardson 1–4)
- 2019: Third round (lost to Ryan Joyce 3–4)

== Career finals ==
=== BDO major finals: 2 ===
Legend
World Championship (0–1)
Zuiderduin Masters (0–1)

Outcome	No.	Year	Championship	Opponent in the final	Score (Note: (l) = score in legs, (s) = score in sets.)
Runner-up	1.	2012	Zuiderduin Masters	(England) Stephen Bunting	0-5 (s)
Runner-up	2.	2014	BDO World Darts Championship	(England) Stephen Bunting	4–7 (s)

=== PDC European tour finals: (1 title) ===
Legend
Other (1–0)

Outcome	No.	Year	Championship	Opponent in the final	Score
Winner	1.	2016	German Darts Championship	Jelle Klaasen	6–5 (l)

== Performance timeline ==
BDO

Tournament	2007	2008	2009	2010	2011	2012	2013	2014	2015
BDO World Championship	DNQ		2R	1R	2R	QF	2R	F	2R
Winmau World Masters	4R	1R	2R	5R	2R	5R	3R	QF	PDC
Finder Darts Masters	DNQ	QF	SF	RR	RR	F	RR	RR	PDC
BDO World Trophy	Not held							QF	PDC

PDC

Tournament	2014	2015	2016	2017	2018	2019
PDC World Championship	BDO		QF	2R	2R	3R
Masters	Did not qualify				1R	DNQ
UK Open	DNP	3R	4R	SF	2R	4R
World Matchplay	BDO	DNQ	1R	QF	DNQ	
World Grand Prix	BDO	DNQ	2R	2R	DNQ	
European Championship	BDO	1R	1R	2R	DNQ	
Grand Slam of Darts	2R	DNQ	RR	RR	DNQ	
Players Championship Finals	BDO	2R	3R	1R	DNQ	
Career statistics
Year-end ranking (PDC)	-	49	21	15	25	67

PDC European Tour

Season	1	2	3	4	5	6	7	8	9	10	11	12	13
2015	GDC; DNQ	GDT; DNQ	GDM; DNQ	DDM; 1R	IDO; DNQ	EDO; QF	EDT; 1R	EDM; 3R	EDG; DNQ				
2016	DDM; DNQ	GDM; 1R	GDT; 2R	EDM; 2R	ADO; 3R	EDO; 2R	IDO; 2R	EDT; 2R	EDG; 3R	GDC; W			
2017	GDC; 3R	GDM; 2R	GDO; 2R	EDG; 2R	GDT; 3R	EDM; 3R	ADO; 2R	EDO; 3R	DDM; 2R	GDG; 2R	IDO; 3R	EDT; 3R	
2018	EDO; 3R	GDG; 3R	GDO; DNQ	ADO; DNQ	EDG; DNQ	DDM; DNQ	GDT; DNQ	DDO; DNQ	EDM; DNQ	GDC; DNQ	DDC; DNQ	IDO; DNQ	EDT; DNQ
2019	EDO; DNQ	GDC; DNQ	GDG; 1R	GDO; DNQ	ADO; DNQ	EDG; DNQ	DDM; 1R	DDO; DNQ	CDO; DNQ	ADC; DNQ	EDM; DNQ	IDO; DNQ	GDT; DNQ

PDC Players Championships

Season	1	2	3	4	5	6	7	8	9	10	11	12	13	14	15	16	17	18	19	20	21	22	23	24	25	26	27	28	29	30
2015	BAR; 4R	BAR; 1R	BAR; 1R	BAR; 1R	BAR; 1R	COV; 1R	COV; 1R	COV; 1R	CRA; 2R	CRA; 1R	BAR; 2R	BAR; 4R	WIG; 4R	WIG; 2R	BAR; 1R	BAR; 3R	DUB; 2R	DUB; W	COV; 1R	COV; 3R										
2016	BAR; 4R	BAR; 3R	BAR; SF	BAR; QF	BAR; 3R	BAR; 1R	BAR; 1R	COV; 2R	COV; QF	BAR; 1R	BAR; 2R	BAR; 4R	BAR; QF	BAR; 2R	BAR; 4R	BAR; 1R	DUB; 1R	DUB; 1R	BAR; 2R	BAR; 3R										
2017	BAR; W	BAR; 3R	BAR; 1R	BAR; 1R	MIL; SF	MIL; 2R	BAR; 2R	BAR; 4R	WIG; 1R	WIG; QF	MIL; 2R	MIL; 3R	WIG; 1R	WIG; 2R	BAR; QF	BAR; 1R	BAR; 2R	BAR; QF	DUB; 1R	DUB; 4R	BAR; 1R	BAR; 1R								
2018	BAR; 1R	BAR; 2R	BAR; 3R	BAR; 1R	MIL; 1R	MIL; 1R	BAR; 2R	BAR; 3R	WIG; 3R	WIG; 2R	MIL; 2R	MIL; 2R	WIG; 2R	WIG; 2R	BAR; 1R	BAR; 1R	BAR; 2R	BAR; 1R	DUB; 1R	DUB; 1R	BAR; 1R	BAR; 1R								
2019	WIG; 1R	WIG; 1R	WIG; 1R	WIG; 2R	BAR; 2R	BAR; 1R	WIG; 1R	WIG; 2R	BAR; 1R	BAR; 1R	BAR; 2R	BAR; 1R	BAR; 1R	BAR; 1R	BAR; 1R	BAR; 2R	WIG; 2R	WIG; 1R	BAR; 1R	BAR; 2R	HIL; 1R	HIL; 2R	BAR; 2R	BAR; 3R	BAR; 2R	BAR; 3R	DUB; 3R	DUB; 3R	BAR; 2R	BAR; 2R

Performance Table Legend
W	Won the tournament	F	Finalist	SF	Semifinalist	QF	Quarterfinalist	#R; RR; Prel.	Lost in # round Round-robin; Preliminary round	DQ	Disqualified
DNQ	Did not qualify	DNP	Did not participate	WD	Withdrew	NH	Tournament not held	#R; RR; Prel.	Lost in # round Round-robin; Preliminary round	NYF	Not yet founded

== Nine-dart finishes ==
Alan Norris televised nine-dart finishes
Date	Opponent	Tournament	Method	Prize
25 November 2016	(England) Michael Smith	Players Championship Finals	3 x T20; 3 x T20; T20, T19, D12	£35,000
