= 2016 German Darts Championship =

Tournament information
- Dates: 14–16 October 2016
- Venue: Halle 39
- Location: Hildesheim, Germany
- Organisation(s): Professional Darts Corporation (PDC)
- Format: Legs
- Prize fund: £115,000
- Winner's share: £25,000
- High checkout: 170 Cristo Reyes

Champion(s)
- Alan Norris (ENG)

The 2016 German Darts Championship is the tenth of ten PDC European Tour events on the 2016 PDC Pro Tour. The tournament takes place at Halle 39 in Hildesheim, Germany, from 14 to 16 October 2016. It featured a field of 48 players and £115,000 in prize money, with £25,000 going to the winner.

Michael van Gerwen was the defending champion, but he lost in the third round to Daryl Gurney. Alan Norris won the title, defeating Jelle Klaasen 6–5 in the final, winning him his first PDC European Tour title.

== Prize money ==
The prize money of the European Tour events stays the same as last year.

Stage (num. of players)		Prize money
Winner	(1)	£25,000
Runner-up	(1)	£10,000
Semi-finalists	(2)	£5,000
Quarter-finalists	(4)	£3,500
Third round losers	(8)	£2,000
Second round losers	(16)	£1,500
First round losers	(16)	£1,000
Total	£115,000	

== Qualification and format ==
The top 16 players from the PDC ProTour Order of Merit on 27 July automatically qualified for the event and were seeded in the second round. The remaining 32 places went to players from three qualifying events - 20 from the UK Qualifier (held in Barnsley on 5 August), eight from the European Qualifier (held on 15 September in Sindelfingen) and four from the Host Nation Qualifier (held on 13 October).

The following players will take part in the tournament:

Top 16
1. (Netherlands) Michael van Gerwen (third round)
2. (Scotland) Peter Wright (third round)
3. (England) Dave Chisnall (semi-finals)
4. (England) Ian White (third round)
5. (Belgium) Kim Huybrechts (third round)
6. (England) Michael Smith (second round)
7. (Netherlands) Benito van de Pas (second round)
8. (Austria) Mensur Suljović (semi-finals)
9. (Wales) Gerwyn Price (second round)
10. (Netherlands) Jelle Klaasen (runner-up)
11. (England) Terry Jenkins (third round)
12. (England) Stephen Bunting (second round)
13. (England) Alan Norris (winner)
14. (Australia) Simon Whitlock (second round)
15. (England) Joe Cullen (quarter-finals)
16. (Northern Ireland) Daryl Gurney (quarter-finals)

UK Qualifier
- (England) Mervyn King (first round)
- (Northern Ireland) Mickey Mansell (first round)
- (England) Mark Walsh (first round)
- (England) Justin Pipe (third round)
- (England) Andy Boulton (first round)
- (Wales) Mark Webster (quarter-finals)
- (Australia) Kyle Anderson (first round)
- (England) Andy Smith (second round)
- (England) Robbie Green (second round)
- (Northern Ireland) Brendan Dolan (first round)
- (England) Kevin Painter (second round)
- (England) Eddie Dootson (second round)
- (England) Darren Johnson (second round)
- (England) Ted Evetts (second round)
- (England) Steve West (quarter-finals)
- (England) Chris Dobey (first round)
- (England) Scott Taylor (second round)
- (England) David Pallett (third round)
- (England) Peter Hudson (second round)
- (England) Steve Hine (first round)

European Qualifier
- (Netherlands) Vincent van der Voort (first round)
- (Spain) Cristo Reyes (third round)
- (Netherlands) Christian Kist (first round)
- (Austria) Rowby-John Rodriguez (second round)
- (Netherlands) Ron Meulenkamp (second round)
- (Netherlands) Yordi Meeuwisse (first round)
- (England) Tony West (first round)
- (Hungary) János Végső (first round)

Host Nation Qualifier
- (Germany) Stefan Stoyke (first round)
- (Germany) Mike Holz (first round)
- (Germany) Marko Puls (first round)
- (Germany) Robert Allenstein (second round)

== Draw ==
First round (best of 11 legs); 14 October
(Netherlands) Christian Kist 98.15	2
(England) Robbie Green 99.40	6
(Netherlands) Ron Meulenkamp 87.99	6
(Germany) Marko Puls 79.48	3
(England) Darren Johnson 85.58	6
(Hungary) János Végső 87.73	1
(Northern Ireland) Brendan Dolan 89.59	3
(England) David Pallett 92.68	6
(England) Chris Dobey 89.81	2
(England) Ted Evetts 88.97	6
(England) Steve West 109.98	6
(England) Tony West 93.04	0
(England) Kevin Painter 95.76	6
(Netherlands) Yordi Meeuwisse 85.21	3
(England) Andy Boulton 89.44	3
(England) Scott Taylor 90.00	6
(Germany) Mike Holz 78.25	3
(England) Eddie Dootson 77.73	6
(England) Steve Hine 85.79	5
(Germany) Robert Allenstein 85.93	6
(Spain) Cristo Reyes 97.29	6
(England) Mark Walsh 88.40	5
(Australia) Kyle Anderson 91.59	2
(Austria) Rowby-John Rodriguez 99.38	6
(England) Mervyn King 96.29	2
(Wales) Mark Webster 99.48	6
(England) Andy Smith 92.25	6
(Germany) Stefan Stoyke 85.61	2
(Netherlands) Vincent van der Voort 90.91	5
(England) Peter Hudson 89.22	6
(England) Justin Pipe 92.24	6
(Northern Ireland) Mickey Mansell 91.18	5

Second round (best of 11 legs); 15 October
1	(Netherlands) Michael van Gerwen 99.83	6
(England) Robbie Green 92.22	4
16	(Northern Ireland) Daryl Gurney 99.55	6
(Netherlands) Ron Meulenkamp 85.91	2
8	(Austria) Mensur Suljović 106.22	6
(England) Darren Johnson 92.10	1
9	(Wales) Gerwyn Price 87.87	5
(England) David Pallett 94.50	6
5	(Belgium) Kim Huybrechts 92.13	6
(England) Ted Evetts 88.25	4
12	(England) Stephen Bunting 79.85	2
(England) Steve West 89.50	6
4	(England) Ian White 91.17	6
(England) Kevin Painter 86.62	5
13	(England) Alan Norris 88.70	6
(England) Scott Taylor 82.35	1
2	(Scotland) Peter Wright 113.77	6
(England) Eddie Dootson 94.74	1
15	(England) Joe Cullen 96.36	6
(Germany) Robert Allenstein 87.81	1
7	(Netherlands) Benito van de Pas 87.61	2
(Spain) Cristo Reyes 91.45	6
10	(Netherlands) Jelle Klaasen 90.71	6
(Austria) Rowby-John Rodriguez 84.51	4
6	(England) Michael Smith 89.25	3
(Wales) Mark Webster 95.37	6
11	(England) Terry Jenkins 94.87	6
(England) Andy Smith 87.02	5
3	(England) Dave Chisnall 102.48	6
(England) Peter Hudson 83.71	0
14	(Australia) Simon Whitlock 91.81	1
(England) Justin Pipe 87.49	6

Third round (best of 11 legs); 16 October
1	(Netherlands) van Gerwen 102.02	4
16	(Northern Ireland) Gurney 96.67	6
8	(Austria) Suljović 91.72	6
(England) Pallett 91.49	4
5	(Belgium) Huybrechts 95.39	5
(England) S. West 91.65	6
4	(England) White 93.24	4
13	(England) Norris 92.15	6
2	(Scotland) Wright 90.37	3
15	(England) Cullen 96.33	6
(Spain) Reyes 103.11	2
10	(Netherlands) Klaasen 102.86	6
(Wales) Webster 93.02	6
11	(England) Jenkins 89.67	5
3	(England) Chisnall 96.82	6
(England) Pipe 91.25	3

Quarter-finals (best of 11 legs); 16 October
16	(Northern Ireland) Gurney 91.17	4
8	(Austria) Suljović 96.34	6
(England) S. West 88.93	2
13	(England) Norris 92.13	6
15	(England) Cullen 93.64	4
10	(Netherlands) Klaasen 99.75	6
(Wales) Webster 92.06	2
3	(England) Chisnall 98.51	6

Semi-finals (best of 11 legs); 16 October
8	(Austria) Suljović 97.23	5
13	(England) Norris 93.96	6
10	(Netherlands) Klaasen 94.79	6
3	(England) Chisnall 90.52	4

Final (best of 11 legs); 16 October
13	(England) Norris 97.48	6
10	(Netherlands) Klaasen 89.19	5
