= Jan Dekker =

Dutch darts player (born 1990)

Personal information
- Nickname: "Double Dekker"
- Born: 25 June 1990 (age 36) Emmen, Netherlands
- Home town: Bolsward, Netherlands

Sport
- Sport: Darts
- Playing since: 1999
- Laterality: Right-handed
- Walk-on music: "Explode" by Jordan & Baker

Organisation (see split in darts)
- BDO: 2008–2015
- PDC: 2015–2020

WDF major events – best performances
- World Championship: Semi-final: 2011, 2014
- World Masters: Quarter-final: 2013
- World Trophy: Last 16: 2014
- Finder Masters: Quarter-final: 2011

PDC premier events – best performances
- World Championship: Last 32: 2018
- UK Open: Last 16: 2015
- Grand Slam: Group Stage: 2011, 2012, 2014
- European Championship: Last 32: 2017
- PC Finals: Quarter-final: 2017

Other tournament wins
- Years
| BDO International Open | 2013 |
| British Classic | 2012 |
| Czech Open | 2014 |
| Hal Open | 2011 |
| Luxembourg Open | 2013 |
| Nijerk Open | 2011 |
| Open Steenwijkerland | 2014 |
| PDC Challenge Tour | 2013, 2015 (x3) |
| Pontins International | 2014 |
| WDF Europe Cup Pairs | 2012 |
| WDF Europe Cup Team | 2012 |

Jan Dekker (born 25 June 1990) is a Dutch former professional darts player. He reached the semi-finals of the BDO World Darts Championship twice, in 2011 and 2014.

== Career ==
Dekker qualified for the televised stages of the 2010 Winmau World Masters. He played eventual champion Martin Adams in the last 16, and was beaten 2–3 after Adams won a sudden-death leg.

He also qualified for the 2011 BDO World Darts Championship. He defeated 15th seed Scott Mitchell 3–0 in the first round, and 2nd seed Stuart Kellett 4–1 in the second round. He then beat tenth seed Garry Thompson 5–4 in the quarter-finals, having trailed 3–0 and 4–2 and seeing Thompson miss nine darts at doubles to win the match himself. He faced Dean Winstanley in the semi-final and lost 6–2.

Dekker was the sixth seed for the 2012 BDO World Darts Championship, where he lost 2–3 in the first round against compatriot and eventual champion Christian Kist despite averaging over 96. The following year, Dekker was seeded seventh and this time reached the quarter-finals, surviving a match dart in the first round against Jeffrey de Graaf, then edging Thompson once more in the second round this time 4–3 having trailed 3–2. In the quarters, Dekker led Richie George 3–1 but eventually lost 5–4.

In 2014, Dekker was seeded sixth and faced a fellow Dutch player in the first round for the third year in a row, this time defeating Benito van de Pas 3–0. He then beat Geert De Vos 4–2 and followed this with his first ever professional victory over three-time world champion Martin Adams, winning 5–2. In the semi-finals Dekker led Alan Norris 4–2 and had two darts to take a 5–4 lead, but eventually lost 6–5.

At the 2015 event, Dekker was knocked out in the first round, losing 3–1 to Martin Adams. Following this defeat Dekker announced he was moving to the PDC.

=== PDC ===
Dekker was knocked out in the last 32 on two of the four days played which was not enough to earn a PDC tour card. However, he had entry into all UK Open and European Tour qualifiers during the year ahead as well as the Challenge Tour. Dekker qualified for the second round of the UK Open and defeated Mike de Decker 5–3, Justin Pipe 9–5 and Ronnie Baxter 9–4 to reach the fifth round. He faced Mensur Suljović and was beaten 9–7. In April Dekker qualified for his first European Tour event, the German Darts Masters. In the first round he was beaten 6–2 by fellow Dutchman Benito van de Pas. During the year Dekker won three Challenge Tour events which saw him finish top of the Order of Merit and take a two-year tour card from 2016.

=== 2016 ===
In Dekker's PDC World Championship debut he was beaten 3–0 by two-time winner Adrian Lewis. He lost 6–5 to Andrew Davidson in the opening round of the 2016 UK Open. Dekker reached the third round of the European Darts Open by defeating John Henderson 6–4 and Dave Chisnall 6–3, but was thrashed 6–0 by Gary Anderson. Dekker made his debut in the Players Championship Finals after being placed 54th on the Order of Merit and beat Steve West 6–3 in the first round, before losing 6–1 to Justin Pipe.

=== 2017 ===
Wins over Andy Jenkins, Joe Cullen, Peter Hudson, Joe Murnan and Dave Chisnall at the ninth Players Championship of 2017 saw Dekker reach the semi-finals of a PDC Pro Tour event for the first time, but he was whitewashed 6–0 by Michael van Gerwen.

Dekker was able to qualify for the 2017 European Championship but was eliminated in the first round by Michael van Gerwen.

His best major tournament result came on 2017 Players Championship Finals, where he made it to the quarterfinals after wins over Michael Smith, Simon Whitlock and Peter Jacques, before losing to Michael van Gerwen yet again. Later on Dekker also qualified for 2017 World Series of Darts Finals, but lost in the first round to another qualifier, Simon Stevenson.

=== 2018 ===
After missing out last year, Dekker qualified for 2018 PDC World Darts Championship. He made it to the second round, winning over his compatriot, Jelle Klaasen, and losing to Dimitri Van den Bergh.

Dekker did not qualify for 2018 UK Open and his only major this year was 2018 Players Championship Finals, where he lost his first round match against Ricky Evans.

=== 2019 ===
Dekker qualified for 2019 PDC World Darts Championship via PDC Pro Tour Order of Merit and made it again to the second round after winning over Lisa Ashton and losing to Mervyn King in the fifth, deciding set.

After new rules for qualification for UK Open, Dekker was seeded into the third round of 2019 UK Open. He won over Harry Ward, but lost in the fourth round to Simon Whitlock. This was the only major he participated in this season. His only two good results in the season were two quarterfinals in PDPA Players Championship 8 and 20. At the end of the year, he dropped to 56th place in PDC Order of Merit after not being able to defend his prize money from 2017 Players Championship Finals. His Tour card was secured only because he won West European Qualifier for 2020 PDC World Darts Championship.

=== 2020 ===
Dekker made it for the third time in a row to the second round of the World Championship, after winning over Ryan Joyce and losing to Jonny Clayton.

Yet again he was seeded into the third round of 2020 UK Open, but this time he lost in his first match against William O'Connor (darts player). It was his only major in 2020 season and because Dekker was not able to qualify for another World Championship, he dropped out of top 64 of PDC Order of Merit, losing his Tour card after 4 years.

=== 2021 ===
Dekker tried to retain his Tour card in European Q-school 2021. He was automatically qualified for the Final stage, but gaining just two points in the Q-school Order of Merit, he finished 44th in the rankings and did not get a new Tour card.

== Personal life ==
Outside of darts, Dekker was a student in the Netherlands, studying business and economics; he graduated in 2012.

== World Championship results ==
=== BDO ===
- 2011: Semi-finals (lost to Dean Winstanley 2–6)
- 2012: First round (lost to Christian Kist 2–3)
- 2013: Quarter-finals (lost to Richie George 4–5)
- 2014: Semi-finals (lost to Alan Norris 5–6)
- 2015: First round (lost to Martin Adams 1–3)

=== PDC ===
- 2016: First round (lost to Adrian Lewis 0–3)
- 2018: Second round (lost to Dimitri Van den Bergh 2–4)
- 2019: Second round (lost to Mervyn King 2–3)
- 2020: Second round (lost to Jonny Clayton 0–3)

== Performance timeline ==
=== BDO ===
| Tournament | 2008 | 2010 | 2011 | 2012 | 2013 | 2014 | 2015 |
|---|---|---|---|---|---|---|---|
| BDO World Championship | DNQ | | SF | 1R | QF | SF | 1R |
| BDO World Trophy | Not held | | | | | 2R | PDC |
| World Masters | 3R | 6R | 4R | 5R | QF | 1R | PDC |
| Finder Masters | DNQ | RR | QF | RR | RR | RR | PDC |

=== PDC ===
| Tournament | 2015 | 2016 | 2017 | 2018 | 2019 | 2020 |
|---|---|---|---|---|---|---|
PDC Ranked televised events
| PDC World Championship | DNQ | 1R | DNQ | 2R | 2R | 2R |
| UK Open | 5R | 1R | 2R | DNQ | 4R | 3R |
| European Championship | DNQ | | 1R | DNQ | | |
| Players Championship Finals | DNQ | 2R | QF | 1R | DNQ | |
PDC Non-ranked televised events
| World Series Finals | DNP | DNQ | 1R | DNQ | | |
Career statistics
| Year-end ranking | 63 | 57 | 45 | 43 | 56 | 69 |

==== Players Championships ====
| Season | 1 | 2 | 3 | 4 | 5 | 6 | 7 | 8 | 9 | 10 | 11 | 12 | 13 | 14 | 15 | 16 | 17 | 18 | 19 | 20 | 21 | 22 | 23 | 24 | 25 | 26 | 27 | 28 | 29 | 30 |
|---|---|---|---|---|---|---|---|---|---|---|---|---|---|---|---|---|---|---|---|---|---|---|---|---|---|---|---|---|---|---|
| 2018 | BAR; 1R | BAR; 3R | BAR; 3R | BAR; QF | MIL; 1R | MIL; 3R | BAR; 3R | BAR; 1R | WIG; 3R | WIG; 1R | MIL; 2R | MIL; 2R | WIG; 1R | WIG; 3R | BAR; 1R | BAR; 2R | BAR; 1R | BAR; 4R | DUB; 3R | DUB; 1R | BAR; 2R | BAR; 3R | | | | | | | | |
| 2019 | WIG; 3R | WIG; 2R | WIG; 1R | WIG; 1R | BAR; 1R | BAR; 1R | WIG; 1R | WIG; QF | BAR; 2R | BAR; 4R | BAR; 2R | BAR; 2R | BAR; 2R | BAR; 1R | BAR; 2R | BAR; 2R | WIG; 1R | WIG; 2R | BAR; 1R | BAR; QF | HIL; 2R | HIL; 1R | BAR; 1R | BAR; 1R | BAR; 1R | BAR; 1R | DUB; 1R | DUB; 1R | BAR; 1R | BAR; 2R |

Performance Table Legend
| W | Won the tournament | F | Finalist | SF | Semifinalist | QF | Quarterfinalist | #R; RR; Prel. | Lost in # round Round-robin; Preliminary round | DQ | Disqualified |
| DNQ | Did not qualify | DNP | Did not participate | WD | Withdrew | NH | Tournament not held | #R; RR; Prel. | Lost in # round Round-robin; Preliminary round | NYF | Not yet founded |
