= Geert De Vos =

Belgian darts player

Personal information
- Nickname: "Foxy"
- Born: 6 October 1981 (age 45) Ninove, Belgium
- Home town: Aalst, Belgium

Sport
- Sport: Darts
- Darts: 24g Datadart Geert De Vos
- Laterality: Right-handed
- Walk-on music: "Because the Night" by Jan Wayne

Organisation (see split in darts)
- BDO: 2005-2018
- PDC: 2019-2022
- WDF: 2023-

WDF major events – best performances
- World Championship: Quarter Final: 2017
- World Masters: Last 16: 2013, 2016
- World Trophy: Winner (1) 2015
- Finder Masters: Semi Final: 2014, 2016

PDC premier events – best performances
- UK Open: Last 128: 2022
- Grand Slam: Group Stages: 2015

Other tournament wins
- Years
Belgium Gold Cup	2006
Bruges Open	2017
England Open	2017
Estonian Open	2014
French Open	2016
German Open	2012, 2013
Hal Masters	2016
Spring Cup	2007, 2012
WDF Europe Cup Team	2010

Other achievements
- East Flanders Open 2014; Open Zeeland 2016

Geert De Vos (born 6 October 1981) is a Belgian darts player. His nickname is "Foxy".

== Career ==
In 2012, De Vos qualified for the first time for BDO World Darts Championship; this performance led to a wildcard for the Zuiderduin Masters. During this tournament, he lost his first match against the eventual winner Scott Waites 5–3.

During the World Championship, De Vos played Tony West, the eleventh seed. The match was won by De Vos 3–1. In the second round, he lost to eventual champion Christian Kist 2–4.

Another remarkable achievement was throwing a nine-darter at the Denmark Open in 2008, a tournament in which he would lose the final against the Polish player Krzysztof Ratajski.

De Vos won the 2015 BDO World Trophy in Manchester. He started his run beating Rick Hofstra 6–3, and then thrashing American Jim Widmayer 6–0. On the final day, he defeated Wesley Harms in the quarter-finals, Mark McGeeney in what was a close game in the Semis, and won a last-leg decider in a classic final against Jeffrey de Graaf 10–9. This win qualified him for the 2015 Grand Slam of Darts where he exited at the group stage with defeats to Robert Thornton and Terry Jenkins. However, he still had one game to play which was against Jonny Clayton, where he threatened the world record average, finishing the match with an average of 113.86

In 2021, De Vos won a PDC Tour Card for the first time at European Q School. During two years with Tour card he was unable to qualify for any major events, playing only in 2021 and 2022 UK Open. He lost his Tour card after 2022, placing outside of top 100 of PDC Order of Merit.

He did not play any major events in 2023 and appeared only in WDF tournaments and on MODUS Super Series, but stated that he wants to return to PDC and regain his Tour card.

De Vos qualified via Home Nation Qualifier for 2024 Belgian Darts Open, making his comeback to PDC event after one year. He lost against Peter Wright in the First round.

== World Championship results ==
=== BDO ===
- 2012: 2nd round (lost to Christian Kist 2–4)
- 2013: 2nd round (lost to Scott Waites 1–4)
- 2014: 2nd round (lost to Jan Dekker 2–4)
- 2015: 2nd round (lost to Scott Mitchell 2–4)
- 2016: 2nd round (lost to Scott Waites 3–4)
- 2017: Quarter-final (lost to Darryl Fitton 4–5)
- 2018: 2nd round (lost to Richard Veenstra 0–4)

== Career finals ==
=== BDO major finals: 1 (1 title) ===
Outcome	No.	Year	Championship	Opponent in the final	Score
Winner	1.	2015	BDO World Trophy	(Netherlands) Jeffrey de Graaf	10–9 (l)

== Performance timeline ==
Tournament	2006	2007	2008	2009	2010	2011	2012	2013	2014	2015	2016	2017	2018	2019	2020	2021	2022	2023	2024
PDC Ranked televised events
UK Open	DNP															1R	2R	DNP	
Grand Slam of Darts	NH	Did not participate								RR	Did not qualify								
BDO / WDF Ranked televised events
BDO World Championship	Did not qualify						2R	2R	2R	2R	2R	QF	2R	DNP		NH	PDC	DNQ	
BDO World Trophy	Not held								DNP	W	2R	1R	DNQ		NH				
Winmau World Masters	1R	3R	2R	3R	2R	DNP	5R	6R	3R	5R	6R	DNQ			NH		PDC	DNQ	
Finder Darts Masters	NH	DNP	RR	DNP		RR	RR	RR	SF	RR	SF	RR	DNP	NH					
Career statistics
PDC Season-end ranking	-	-	-	-	-	-	-	-	-	-	-	-	-	-	196	116	109	-	228

PDC European Tour

Season	1	2	3	4	5	6	7	8	9	10	11	12	13
2020	BDC; 1R	DNP											
2021	HDT; 2R	GDT; DNQ											
2024	BDO; 1R	Did not participate											

PDC Players Championships

Season	1	2	3	4	5	6	7	8	9	10	11	12	13	14	15	16	17	18	19	20	21	22	23	24	25	26	27	28	29	30
2021	BOL; 1R	BOL; 1R	BOL; 1R	BOL; 2R	MIL; 2R	MIL; 1R	MIL; 3R	MIL; 2R	NIE; 3R	NIE; 1R	NIE; 1R	NIE; 1R	MIL; 2R	MIL; 1R	MIL; 3R	MIL; 1R	COV; 1R	COV; 2R	COV; 1R	COV; 2R	BAR; DNP	BAR; DNP	BAR; DNP	BAR; 1R	BAR; 1R	BAR; 2R	BAR; 3R	BAR; 1R	BAR; 1R	BAR; 1R
2022	BAR; 1R	BAR; 3R	WIG; 1R	WIG; 1R	BAR; 1R	BAR; 1R	NIE; 2R	NIE; 3R	BAR; 1R	BAR; 1R	BAR; 1R	BAR; 1R	BAR; 1R	WIG; 1R	WIG; 1R	NIE; 2R	NIE; 1R	BAR; 1R	BAR; 1R	BAR; 3R	BAR; 2R	BAR; 2R	BAR; 1R	BAR; 2R	BAR; 1R	BAR; 2R	BAR; 1R	BAR; 2R	BAR; DNP	BAR; DNP

Performance Table Legend
W	Won the tournament	F	Finalist	SF	Semifinalist	QF	Quarterfinalist	#R; RR; Prel.	Lost in # round Round-robin; Preliminary round	DQ	Disqualified
DNQ	Did not qualify	DNP	Did not participate	WD	Withdrew	NH	Tournament not held	#R; RR; Prel.	Lost in # round Round-robin; Preliminary round	NYF	Not yet founded
