= 2016 International Darts Open =

Tournament information
- Dates: 2–4 September 2016
- Venue: SACHSENarena
- Location: Riesa, Germany
- Organisation(s): Professional Darts Corporation (PDC)
- Format: Legs
- Prize fund: £115,000
- Winner's share: £25,000
- High checkout: 167 Kyle Anderson

Champion(s)
- Mensur Suljović (AUT)

The 2016 International Darts Open was the seventh of ten PDC European Tour events on the 2016 PDC Pro Tour. The tournament took place at SACHSENarena in Riesa, Germany, from 2 to 4 September 2016. It featured a field of 48 players and £115,000 in prize money, with £25,000 going to the winner.

Michael Smith was the defending champion, but he lost 6–4 to James Wilson in the second round.

Mensur Suljović won the final 6–5 against Kim Huybrechts, winning his first PDC European Tour title, after Huybrechts missed seven match darts in the final leg to win the match himself.

== Prize money ==
The prize money of the European Tour events stays the same as last year.

| Stage (num. of players) | | Prize money |
|---|---|---|
| Winner | (1) | £25,000 |
| Runner-up | (1) | £10,000 |
| Semi-finalists | (2) | £5,000 |
| Quarter-finalists | (4) | £3,500 |
| Third round losers | (8) | £2,000 |
| Second round losers | (16) | £1,500 |
| First round losers | (16) | £1,000 |
| Total | £115,000 | |

== Qualification and format ==
The top 16 players from the PDC ProTour Order of Merit on 22 June automatically qualified for the event and were seeded in the second round. The remaining 32 places went to players from three qualifying events - 20 from the UK Qualifier (held in Barnsley on 1 July), eight from the European Qualifier on 1 September and four from the Host Nation Qualifier on 1 September.

James Wade withdrew from the tournament the day before it began, so seeds 4-16 moved up one space each, and Daryl Gurney became the 16th seed, with an extra space being made for a Host Nation Qualifier.

Michael van Gerwen withdrew due to an ankle injury from the tournament the day it began, quickly followed by Daryl Gurney, who withdrew due to a broken finger in his dart throwing hand. Amazingly, the players they were due to play in round 2 (Ryan Meikle and Yordi Meeuwisse) received byes to play each other in round 3.

The following players took part in the tournament:

Top 16
1. (Netherlands) ~~Michael van Gerwen~~ (withdrew)
2. (Scotland) Peter Wright (third round)
3. (Belgium) Kim Huybrechts (runner-up)
4. (England) Dave Chisnall (third round)
5. (England) Michael Smith (second round)
6. (England) Ian White (third round)
7. (Netherlands) Benito van de Pas (semi-finals)
8. (Netherlands) Jelle Klaasen (third round)
9. (Austria) Mensur Suljović (winner)
10. (Scotland) Robert Thornton (third round)
11. (Wales) Gerwyn Price (second round)
12. (England) Terry Jenkins (third round)
13. (England) Alan Norris (second round)
14. (England) Stephen Bunting (second round)
15. (Australia) Simon Whitlock (quarter-finals)
16. (Northern Ireland) ~~Daryl Gurney~~ (withdrew)

UK Qualifier
- (England) James Wilson (semi-finals)
- (England) Joe Cullen (second round)
- (Scotland) Jim Walker (second round)
- (England) Andy Hamilton (first round)
- (England) Michael Barnard (first round)
- (England) James Richardson (first round)
- (England) Jamie Caven (first round)
- (Australia) Kyle Anderson (second round)
- (Northern Ireland) Brendan Dolan (first round)
- (England) Andy Boulton (quarter-finals)
- (England) Kevin Painter (first round)
- (England) Robbie Green (third round)
- (England) Ryan Meikle (third round)
- (England) Mark Frost (first round)
- (England) Ricky Evans (first round)
- (South Africa) Devon Petersen (second round)
- (England) Chris Dobey (second round)
- (England) Darren Webster (second round)
- (England) Steve West (second round)

European Qualifier
- (Belgium) Ronny Huybrechts (second round)
- (Netherlands) Jeffrey de Graaf (first round)
- (Netherlands) Jeffrey de Zwaan (first round)
- (Netherlands) Jermaine Wattimena (second round)
- (Poland) Krzysztof Ratajski (first round)
- (Austria) Michael Rasztovits (first round)
- (Netherlands) Vincent Kamphuis (first round)
- (Netherlands) Yordi Meeuwisse (quarter-finals)

Host Nation Qualifier
- (Austria) Maik Langendorf (first round)
- (Germany) René Eidams (first round)
- (Germany) Max Hopp (first round)
- (Germany) Dragutin Horvat (quarter-finals)
- (Germany) Mike Holz (second round)

== Draw ==
First round (best of 11 legs); 2 September
(England) Ryan Meikle 83.50 | 6
(Austria) Michael Rasztovits 76.08 | 0
(Northern Ireland) Brendan Dolan 90.32 | 5
(Netherlands) Yordi Meeuwisse 94.82 | 6
(England) Chris Dobey 102.33 | 6
(Poland) Krzysztof Ratajski 93.69 | 1
(England) Michael Barnard 84.61 | 5
(Germany) Mike Holz 87.35 | 6
(England) Andy Hamilton 80.55 | 2
(England) James Wilson 94.66 | 6
(England) Darren Webster 90.26 | 6
(Germany) Max Hopp 90.07 | 3
(Netherlands) Jeffrey de Zwaan 81.63 | 2
(Netherlands) Jermaine Wattimena 86.21 | 6
(England) Jamie Caven 81.98 | 3
(England) Andy Boulton 80.64 | 6
(England) Steve West 83.65 | 6
(Germany) René Eidams 85.16 | 1
(England) Kevin Painter 80.12 | 1
(South Africa) Devon Petersen 85.86 | 6
(Australia) Kyle Anderson 91.58 | 6
(Netherlands) Vincent Kamphuis 78.71 | 2
(Belgium) Ronny Huybrechts 93.41 | 6
(England) Mark Frost 85.54 | 3
(Scotland) Jim Walker 84.68 | 6
(Austria) Maik Langendorf 81.15 | 3
(England) Ricky Evans 93.22 | 4
(Germany) Dragutin Horvat 94.81 | 6
(England) Joe Cullen 98.88 | 6
(Netherlands) Jeffrey de Graaf 90.85 | 4
(England) Robbie Green 93.65 | 6
(England) James Richardson 94.64 | 4

Second round (best of 11 legs); 3 September
1 | (Netherlands) ~~Michael van Gerwen~~ | w/d
(England) Ryan Meikle | w/o
16 | (Northern Ireland) ~~Daryl Gurney~~ | w/d
(Netherlands) Yordi Meeuwisse | w/o
8 | (Netherlands) Jelle Klaasen 91.14 | 6
(England) Chris Dobey 82.81 | 3
9 | (Austria) Mensur Suljović 95.21 | 6
(Germany) Mike Holz 89.09 | 3
5 | (England) Michael Smith 96.89 | 4
(England) James Wilson 100.31 | 6
12 | (England) Terry Jenkins 90.98 | 6
(England) Darren Webster 91.80 | 5
4 | (England) Dave Chisnall 94.19 | 6
(Netherlands) Jermaine Wattimena 84.52 | 1
13 | (England) Alan Norris 73.97 | 1
(England) Andy Boulton 84.36 | 6
2 | (Scotland) Peter Wright 91.09 | 6
(England) Steve West 85.62 | 4
15 | (Australia) Simon Whitlock 95.39 | 6
(South Africa) Devon Petersen 88.50 | 1
7 | (Netherlands) Benito van de Pas 89.75 | 6
(Australia) Kyle Anderson 89.38 | 5
10 | (Scotland) Robert Thornton 89.28 | 6
(Belgium) Ronny Huybrechts 89.22 | 4
6 | (England) Ian White 95.41 | 6
(Scotland) Jim Walker 84.05 | 2
11 | (Wales) Gerwyn Price 94.25 | 5
(Germany) Dragutin Horvat 93.89 | 6
3 | (Belgium) Kim Huybrechts 104.55 | 6
(England) Joe Cullen 95.46 | 5
14 | (England) Stephen Bunting 99.59 | 1
(England) Robbie Green 101.11 | 6

Third round (best of 11 legs); 4 September
(England) Meikle 94.84 | 2
(Netherlands) Meeuwisse 100.49 | 6
8 | (Netherlands) Klaasen 90.41 | 5
9 | (Austria) Suljović 98.14 | 6
(England) Wilson 93.58 | 6
12 | (England) Jenkins 88.20 | 4
4 | (England) Chisnall 104.59 | 5
(England) Boulton 98.15 | 6
2 | (Scotland) Wright 107.19 | 3
15 | (Australia) Whitlock 103.30 | 6
7 | (Netherlands) van de Pas 90.66 | 6
10 | (Scotland) Thornton 78.02 | 2
6 | (England) White 101.33 | 4
(Germany) Horvat 99.41 | 6
3 | (Belgium) K. Huybrechts 93.12 | 6
(England) Green 81.47 | 2

Quarter-finals (best of 11 legs); 4 September
(Netherlands) Meeuwisse 89.58 | 1
9 | (Austria) Suljović 98.54 | 6
(England) Wilson 93.56 | 6
(England) Boulton 84.67 | 1
15 | (Australia) Whitlock 94.38 | 5
7 | (Netherlands) van de Pas 90.57 | 6
(Germany) Horvat 86.97 | 1
3 | (Belgium) K. Huybrechts 100.75 | 6

Semi-finals (best of 11 legs); 4 September
9 | (Austria) Suljović 96.87 | 6
(England) Wilson 86.48 | 1
7 | (Netherlands) van de Pas 94.96 | 2
3 | (Belgium) K. Huybrechts 95.95 | 6

Final (best of 11 legs); 4 September
9 | (Austria) Suljović 95.15 | 6
3 | (Belgium) K. Huybrechts 93.89 | 5
