= Sam Head =

English darts player

Personal information
- Born: 14 June 1993 (age 33) Portsmouth, Hampshire, England
- Home town: Portsmouth, Hampshire, England

Sport
- Sport: Darts
- Playing since: 2010
- Darts: 23 Gram
- Laterality: Right-handed
- Walk-on music: "Witch Doctor" by Cartoons

Organisation (see split in darts)
- BDO: 2012–2018, 2019
- PDC: 2018

WDF major events – best performances
- World Championship: Last 40: 2014, 2015
- World Masters: Last 16: 2012

Other tournament wins
- Years
British Teenage Open	2012

Sam Head (born 14 June 1993) is an English former darts player who most recently played in British Darts Organisation (BDO) events.

== Career ==
Head in 2012 almost caused a sensation when he reached the last 16 of the Winmau World Masters his first televised tournament. In the same year he won the British Teenage Open und started to play quite successfully on the PDC Youth Tour. Due to his consistency he managed to qualify for the BDO World Championships 2014 but lost first round to Mike Day from New Zealand. In 2019, he reached the Semi Finals of the Estonian Masters, losing to John Scott of England.

== World Championship results ==
=== BDO ===
- 2014: Preliminary Round (lost to Mike Day 0–3)
- 2015: Preliminary Round (lost to Peter Sajwani 0–3)
