= 2011 World Masters (darts) =

Winmau World Masters

Tournament information
- Dates: 1–4 September
- Venue: Hull Arena
- Location: East Riding of Yorkshire
- Country: England
- Organisation(s): BDO
- Format: Sets for men, Legs for women, boys and girls
- Prize fund: £65,500
- Winner's share: £25,000 (men), £5,000 (women)
- High checkout: £1k (non-televised), £2k (televised) Highest Out Scott Waites & Christian Kist: 170 Lowest Out: Glen Durrant & Ross Montgomery: 2

Champion(s)
- (England) Scott Waites (men) (England) Lisa Ashton (women) (Netherlands) Jimmy Hendriks (boys) (Scotland) Emily Davidson

The 2011 Winmau World Masters was a major televised tournament on the BDO/WDF calendar for 2011. It took place from 1–4 September in the Hull Arena, which hosted the event for the first time, taking over from the nearby Hull City Hall.

Defending men's champion Martin Adams lost in the semi-finals to Scott Waites, who went on to win his first World Masters title beating Dean Winstanley by 7 sets to 2 in the final. Defending women's Master Julie Gore lost in the semi-finals to Trina Gulliver.

== Seeds ==
Men

These were finalised on completion of the 2011 Swedish Open on 19–21 August. The men's seeds were exempt until the Last 16 stage and could not play each other until the quarter-final stage.

1. (England) Martin Adams
2. (England) Dean Winstanley
3. (England) Robbie Green
4. (England) Scott Waites
5. (England) Gary Robson
6. (Scotland) Ross Montgomery
7. (England) Tony West
8. (England) John Walton

Women

These were finalised on completion of the 2011 Swedish Open on 19–21 August. The ladies seeds entered at the start of the competition however could not play each other until the quarter-final stage. Francis Hoenselaar was scheduled to be the number 8 seed, but pulled out for personal reasons.

1. (England) Deta Hedman
2. (Wales) Julie Gore
3. (England) Trina Gulliver
4. (Russia) Irina Armstrong
5. (England) Karen Lawman
6. (Russia) Anastasia Dobromyslova
7. (England) Lorraine Farlam
8. (Netherlands) Karin Krappen

There were no seedings in the boys or girls events.

== Men's Draw ==
Last 24 onwards. All the below matches were televised.

Sets were best of 3 legs.

Last 24; Best of 5 sets Losers £0
(Wales) Kevin Thomas (75.09)	0
(England) Steve Douglas (78.78)	3
(England) Glen Durrant (85.53)	3
(Scotland) Craig Baxter (80.22)	2
(England) Richie Howson (85.29)	2
(England) Andrew Gilding (86.34)	3
(Scotland) Ewan Hyslop (96.30)	3
(Norway) Robert Wagner (82.26)	0
(Netherlands) Rick Hofstra (81.66)	3
(United States) Jim Widmayer (80.55)	2
(Poland) Radek Szagański (79.38)	1
(Netherlands) Christian Kist (87.15)	3
(England) Colin Fowler (86.97)	2
(Wales) Martin Phillips (87.63)	3
(England) Stephen Bunting (82.02)	3
(Wales) Peter Johns (77.01)	0

Last 16; Best of 5 sets Losers £1,000
1	(England) Martin Adams (94.76)	3
(England) Steve Douglas (83.22)	1
8	(England) John Walton (86.81)	1
(England) Glen Durrant (97.39)	3
5	(England) Gary Robson (84.99)	3
(England) Andrew Gilding (84.30)	1
4	(England) Scott Waites (96.39)	3
(Scotland) Ewan Hyslop (91.92)	0
2	(England) Dean Winstanley (78.54)	3
(Netherlands) Rick Hofstra (73.44)	0
7	(England) Tony West (95.73)	3
(Netherlands) Christian Kist (93.72)	2
6	(Scotland) Ross Montgomery (88.71)	3
(Wales) Martin Phillips (84.03)	2
3	(England) Robbie Green (89.31)	1
(England) Stephen Bunting (90.99)	3

Quarter-finals; Best of 5 sets Losers £1,500
1	(England) Martin Adams (88.68)	3
(England) Glen Durrant (85.83)	1
5	(England) Gary Robson (88.95)	2
4	(England) Scott Waites (97.32)	3
2	(England) Dean Winstanley (93.18)	3
7	(England) Tony West (89.76)	2
6	(Scotland) Ross Montgomery (90.09)	3
(England) Stephen Bunting (79.89)	0

Semi-finals; Best of 9 sets Losers £3,000
1	(England) Martin Adams (100.35)	3
4	(England) Scott Waites (102.69)	5
2	(England) Dean Winstanley (83.10)	5
6	(Scotland) Ross Montgomery (80.94)	4

Final; Best of 13 sets Winner £25,000; Runner up £10,000
4	(England) Scott Waites (100.62)	7
2	(England) Dean Winstanley (95.85)	2

== Ladies Draw ==
Last 8 onwards. The Semi-finals and final were televised.

Quarter-finals; Best of 7 legs Losers £500
(England) Merryl Dennis	4
(England) Dee Bateman	2
(England) Zoe Jones	2
(England) Lisa Ashton	4
3	(England) Trina Gulliver	4
(England) Jennifer Summerson	3
7	(England) Lorraine Farlam	2
2	(Wales) Julie Gore	4

Semi-finals; Best of 7 legs Losers £750
(England) Merryl Dennis (66.39)	3
(England) Lisa Ashton (67.80)	4
3	(England) Trina Gulliver (70.32)	4
2	(Wales) Julie Gore (65.07)	1

Final; Best of 7 legs Winner £5,000; Runner up £2,000
(England) Lisa Ashton (71.13)	4
3	(England) Trina Gulliver (69.48)	1

== Boys Draw ==
Last 8 onwards.

Quarter-finals; Best of 7 legs
(Belgium) Kenny Neyens	3
(Netherlands) Jimmy Hendriks	4
(England) Jack Tweddell	2
(Netherlands) Mike Zuijdwijk	4
(Wales) Rhys Griffin	3
(Wales) Sam Cankett	4
(England) Jake Jones	4
(England) Joe Davis	2

Semi-finals; Best of 7 legs
(Netherlands) Jimmy Hendriks	4
(Netherlands) Mike Zuijdwijk	1
(Wales) Sam Cankett	1
(England) Jake Jones	4

Final; Best of 7 legs
(Netherlands) Jimmy Hendriks (82.14)	4
(England) Jake Jones (74.82)	2

== Girls Draw ==
Last 8 onwards.

Quarter-finals; Best of 7 legs
(Germany) Anna-Maria Schulze	0
(England) Stacey Ellis	4
(Germany) Ann-Kathrin Wigmann	0
(Scotland) Emily Davidson	4
(Netherlands) Joyce Schuurman	0
(Belgium) Joyce Janssens	4
(Germany) Stefanie Haller
(Wales) Alannah Waters

Semi-finals; Best of 7 legs
(England) Stacey Ellis	1
(Scotland) Emily Davidson	4
(Belgium) Joyce Janssens	1
(Wales) Alannah Waters	4

Final; Best of 7 legs
(Scotland) Emily Davidson (63.27)	4
(Wales) Alannah Waters (59.28)	0

== Television coverage ==
The tournament was shown in the UK by sports subscription channel ESPN who took over from the BBC who broadcast the last ten World Masters. ESPN broadcast the last three days of the tournament. The tournament was shown in the USA for the very first time with ESPN3 broadcasting it. The event was also shown on Eurosport and Eurosport Asia.
