= 2014 BDO World Darts Championship =

Tournament information
- Dates: 4–12 January 2014
- Venue: Lakeside Country Club
- Location: Frimley Green, Surrey
- Country: England, United Kingdom
- Organisation(s): BDO
- Format: Sets; Finals: best of 13 (men's) best of 5 (women's)
- Prize fund: £300,000 (men) £29,000 (women)
- Winner's share: £100,000 (men) £12,000 (women)
- High checkout: 164 (England) Robbie Green

Champion(s)
- (England) Stephen Bunting (men) (England) Lisa Ashton (women)

The 2014 BDO World Darts Championship (known for sponsorship reasons as the 2014 Lakeside World Professional Darts Championship) was the 37th World Championship organised by the British Darts Organisation, and the 29th staging at the Lakeside Country Club at Frimley Green.

Scott Waites was the defending men's champion, having won the title for the first time in the 2013 championship, but he was defeated 0–3 in the first round by eventual runner-up Alan Norris, who in turn lost to first seed Stephen Bunting in the final. The defending women's champion was Anastasia Dobromyslova, who won her third title in 2013. She lost to the eventual champion Lisa Ashton in the semi-finals.

This tournament saw the biggest field ever for a BDO World Championship. 56 players – 40 men, up from 32 in 2013, and 16 women – up from 8 in 2013 – competed for the world titles.

Players competed to reach the BBC televised finals, which ran from 4–12 January 2014.

== Format and qualifiers ==
=== Prize money ===
The prize money was increased to £300,000 for the men's event and £29,000 for the women's event. There is a £52,000 bonus for hitting a Nine-dart finish in both versions of the tournament.

Position (num. of players)		Prize money
Men's Champion	(1)	£100,000
Runner-Up	(1)	£35,000
Semi-Finalist	(2)	£15,000
Quarter-Finalist	(4)	£6,500
Last 16	(8)	£4,500
Last 32	(16)	£3,250
Preliminary round losers	(8)	£2,000
Highest Checkout	(1)	£5,000

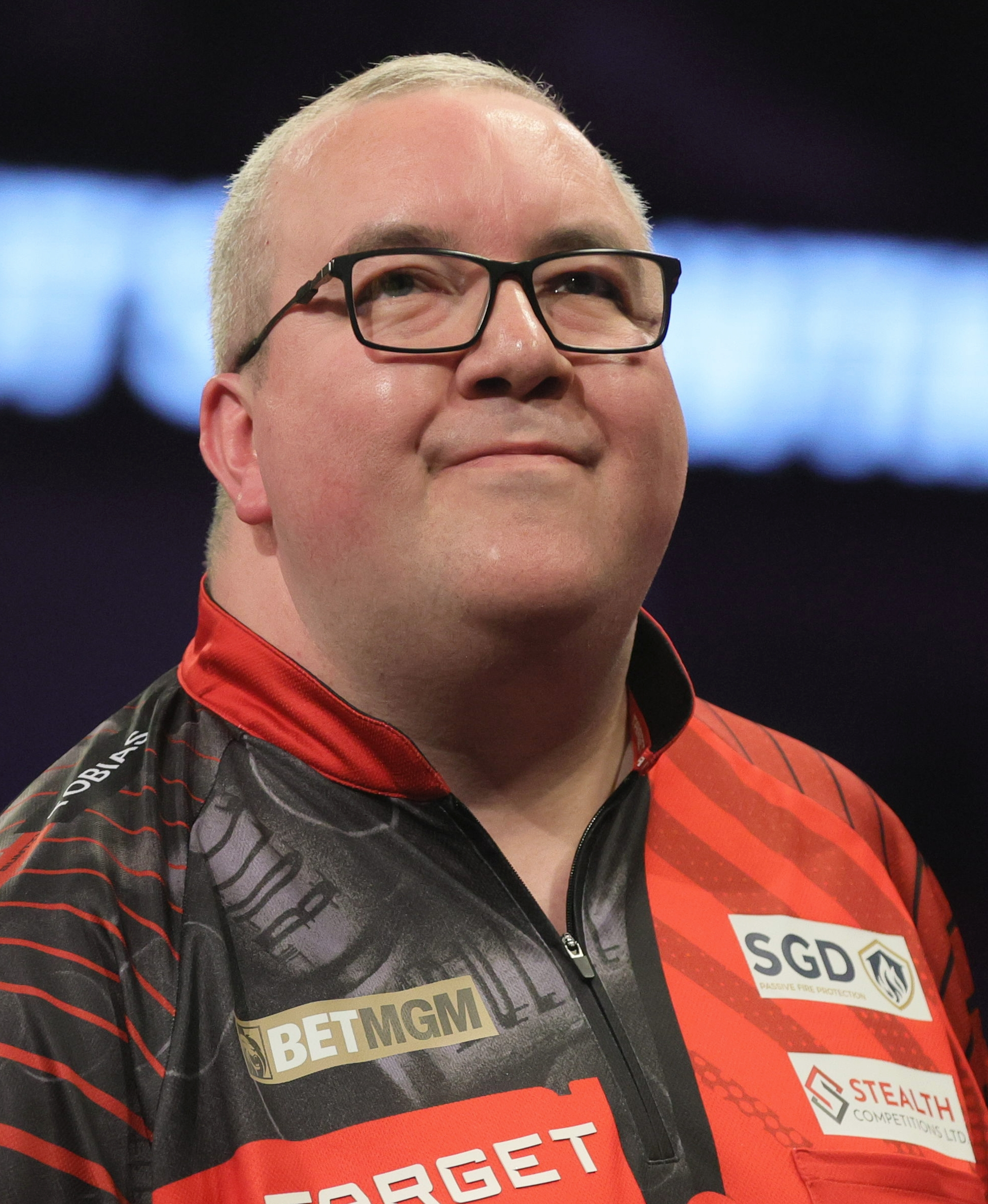
Stephen Bunting - Winner 2014

Position (num. of players)		Prize money
Women's Champion	(1)	£12,000
Runner-Up	(1)	£5,000
Semi-Finalist	(2)	£2,000
Quarter-Finalist	(4)	£1,000
Last 16	(8)	£500

=== Men's ===
The televised stages feature 40 players – an increase from 32 in previous years. The top 16 players in the BDO Invitational Rankings over the 2012/13 season are seeded for the tournament. Players who finish between 17th and 24th in the invitational rankings receive a bye into the last 32. The remaining 16 players enter in the preliminary rounds – this includes recent world champions not in the top 24, a qualifier from each of the eight WDF regions, four players who came through the pre-qualifying knockout tournament, and the Winmau World Masters winner (if not already qualified). Should there be fewer than 40 players qualified after the above process, the next unqualified player from the invitational rankings will be entered until the total reaches 40.

Top 16

1. (England) Stephen Bunting
2. (England) James Wilson
3. (England) Tony O'Shea
4. (England) Robbie Green
5. (England) Darryl Fitton
6. (Netherlands) Jan Dekker
7. (England) Scott Waites
8. (Netherlands) Jeffrey de Graaf
9. (Netherlands) Remco van Eijden
10. (England) Glen Durrant
11. (Belgium) Geert De Vos
12. (Netherlands) Wesley Harms
13. (England) Gary Robson
14. (Scotland) Ross Montgomery
15. (England) Scott Mitchell
16. (Wales) Jim Williams

17-28 in BDO Rankings

17. (England) Paul Jennings
18. (England) Martin Atkins
19. (England) Richie George
20. (Netherlands) Benito van de Pas
21. (Netherlands) Rick Hofstra
22. (England) Tony Eccles
23. (England) Alan Norris
24. (Netherlands) Ron Meulenkamp
25. (England) Garry Thompson
26. (England) Sam Head
27. (Netherlands) Christian Kist
28. (England) Martin Adams

Hull qualifiers

1. (England) Paul Hogan
2. (Republic of Ireland) Michael Meaney
3. (Greece) John Michael
4. (England) Dave Prins

WDF regional qualifiers

1. (Japan) Hiroaki Shimizu
2. (Australia) Harley Kemp
3. (Latvia) Madars Razma
4. (Canada) David Cameron
5. (Czech Republic) Karel Sedláček
6. (New Zealand) Mike Day
7. (United States) Jim Widmayer
8. (Netherlands) Jeroen Geerdink

=== Women's ===
The televised stages feature 16 players, an increase from 8 in previous years. The top 8 players in the WDF/BDO rankings over the 2012/13 season are seeded for the tournament.

Top 8

1. (England) Deta Hedman
2. (England) Trina Gulliver
3. (Russia) Anastasia Dobromyslova
4. (Wales) Julie Gore
5. (England) Rachel Brooks
6. (England) Fallon Sherrock
7. (Netherlands) Aileen de Graaf
8. (Germany) Irina Armstrong

Other qualifiers

1. (England) Lorraine Farlam
2. (Norway) Rachna David
3. (Netherlands) Sharon Prins
4. (England) Lisa Ashton
5. (Netherlands) Karin Krappen

Hull qualifiers

1. (Denmark) Ann-Louise Peters
2. (Netherlands) Rilana Erades
3. (Netherlands) Tamara Schuur

== Draw ==
=== Men ===
==== Preliminary round ====
Played from 4 to 6 January. All matches best of 5 sets.

Av.	Player	Score	Player	Av.
77.07	(Canada) David Cameron (Q)	1 – 3	(England) Martin Adams	87.27
79.38	(Latvia) Madars Razma (Q)	3 – 2	(Greece) John Michael (Q)	83.19
77.94	(Australia) Harley Kemp (Q)	0 – 3	(Republic of Ireland) Michael Meaney (Q)	80.25
78.93	(Japan) Hiroaki Shimizu (Q)	2 – 3	(Netherlands) Christian Kist	86.96
77.88	(New Zealand) Mike Day (Q)	3 – 0	(England) Sam Head	73.68
73.95	(United States) Jim Widmayer (Q)	3 – 2	(England) Garry Thompson	72.99
83.28	(Czech Republic) Karel Sedláček (Q)	1 – 3	(England) Paul Hogan (Q)	83.76
77.58	(Netherlands) Jeroen Geerdink (Q)	0 – 3	(England) Dave Prins (Q)	80.67

==== Last 32 ====
First Round (best of 5 sets); 4–7 January
1	(England) Stephen Bunting 91.60	3
Q	(United States) Jim Widmayer 76.57	1
16	(Wales) Jim Williams 78.69	0
Q	(England) Dave Prins 86.55	3
8	(Netherlands) Jeffrey de Graaf 72.96	0
(England) Martin Atkins 83.04	3
9	(Netherlands) Remco van Eijden 82.35	0
(Netherlands) Rick Hofstra 90.78	3
5	(England) Darryl Fitton 85.92	1
(England) Tony Eccles 86.31	3
12	(Netherlands) Wesley Harms 83.76	3
(England) Paul Jennings 81.45	0
4	(England) Robbie Green 94.29	3
(England) Richie George 88.11	0
13	(England) Gary Robson 88.32	3
(Netherlands) Ron Meulenkamp 87.87	2
2	(England) James Wilson 96.33	3
(Netherlands) Christian Kist 95.91	1
15	(England) Scott Mitchell 88.26	3
Q	(England) Paul Hogan 85.61	2
7	(England) Scott Waites 87.54	0
(England) Alan Norris 93.27	3
10	(England) Glen Durrant 86.16	3
Q	(New Zealand) Mike Day 75.87	0
6	(Netherlands) Jan Dekker 83.61	3
(Netherlands) Benito van de Pas 75.66	0
11	(Belgium) Geert De Vos 84.93	3
Q	(Latvia) Madars Razma 79.23	1
3	(England) Tony O'Shea 74.97	0
(England) Martin Adams 87.27	3
14	(Scotland) Ross Montgomery 80.19	3
Q	(Republic of Ireland) Michael Meaney 79.56	2

Second Round (best of 7); 8–9 January
1	(England) Stephen Bunting 100.65	4
Q	(England) Dave Prins 89.79	0
(England) Martin Atkins	0^{r}^{1}
(Netherlands) Rick Hofstra	2
(England) Tony Eccles 87.87	4
12	(Netherlands) Wesley Harms 87.60	3
4	(England) Robbie Green 90.21	4
13	(England) Gary Robson 85.86	1
2	(England) James Wilson 92.49	4
15	(England) Scott Mitchell 88.32	2
(England) Alan Norris 93.84	4
10	(England) Glen Durrant 92.43	1
6	(Netherlands) Jan Dekker 85.53	4
11	(Belgium) Geert De Vos 83.11	2
(England) Martin Adams 85.62	4
14	(Scotland) Ross Montgomery 83.64	1

Quarter-Finals (best of 9); 9–10 January
1	(England) Stephen Bunting 90.87	5
(Netherlands) Rick Hofstra 89.13	2
(England) Tony Eccles 89.32	2
4	(England) Robbie Green 91.75	5
2	(England) James Wilson 99.06	2
(England) Alan Norris 97.47	5
6	(Netherlands) Jan Dekker 91.42	5
(England) Martin Adams 90.18	2

Semi-Finals (best of 11); 11 January
1	(England) Stephen Bunting 93.12	6
4	(England) Robbie Green 85.68	1
(England) Alan Norris 92.34	6
6	(Netherlands) Jan Dekker 87.75	5

Final (best of 13); 12 January
1	(England) Stephen Bunting 96.36	7
(England) Alan Norris 92.18	4

1 Martin Atkins retired from the championship due to an elbow injury while trailing 2-0 in sets to Hofstra.

=== Women's ===
Lisa Ashton won her first world championship title. In the final she trailed Deta Hedman 0–2 before turning the match.

First Round (best of 3 sets); 4–9 January
1	(England) Deta Hedman 83.70	3	3
(England) Lorraine Farlam 70.47	1	0
8	(Germany) Irina Armstrong 79.80	3	3
(Netherlands) Sharon Prins 68.13	0	0
4	(Wales) Julie Gore 55.35	3	3
(Norway) Rachna David 52.32	1	2
5	(England) Rachel Brooks 66.03	1	1
Q	(Denmark) Ann-Louise Peters 68.64	3	3
2	(England) Trina Gulliver 65.37	1	0
Q	(Netherlands) Tamara Schuur 72.90	3	3
7	(Netherlands) Aileen de Graaf 77.34	3	0	2
(England) Lisa Ashton 79.53	1	3	3
3	(Russia) Anastasia Dobromyslova 68.49	1	3	3
(Netherlands) Karin Krappen 66.63	3	0	1
6	(England) Fallon Sherrock 67.35	3	3
Q	(Netherlands) Rilana Erades 64.59	0	2

Quarter-Finals (best of 3); 9–10 January
1	(England) Deta Hedman 75.06	3	3
8	(Germany) Irina Armstrong 71.67	1	2
4	(Wales) Julie Gore 55.47	0	1
Q	(Denmark) Ann-Louise Peters 67.06	3	3
Q	(Netherlands) Tamara Schuur 68.97	2	0
(England) Lisa Ashton 74.19	3	3
3	(Russia) Anastasia Dobromyslova 73.71	2	3	3
6	(England) Fallon Sherrock 76.11	3	2	0

Semi-Finals (best of 3); 11 January
1	(England) Deta Hedman 80.01	3	3
Q	(Denmark) Ann-Louise Peters 69.54	?	?
(England) Lisa Ashton 82.44	?	3	3
3	(Russia) Anastasia Dobromyslova 81.45	3	2	1

Final (best of 5); 11 January
1	(England) Deta Hedman 77.79	3	3	2	0	1
(England) Lisa Ashton 84.81	2	0	3	3	3

== Media coverage ==
On 6 January 2013 it was announced the BBC had signed a three-year deal to show the World Championships from 2014 to 2016, on 4 December 2013 it was announced the BBC showed the tournament exclusively in Britain which they did from 1978 to 2011. This means most matches (bar the first ladies match) were shown live.

It was also announced the coverage would be presented by Colin Murray and Bobby George which it has been since 2010 despite Murray leaving Match of the Day 2 and BBC Radio 5 Live to move to Talksport. Rob Walker returned as reporter and Darts Extra presenter which is a role he has held since 2010. Commentary was by Tony Green, Vassos Alexander and Jim Proudfoot, along with John Rawling for the first time. Green commentated for the BBC for every year of the tournament from 1978 to 2010 and 2012–present missing the 2011 Championships due to illness, Alexander replaced Green in 2011 and continues in the role for 2014 and Proudfoot commentated on the 2013 championships replacing David Croft who moved to Sky to commentate on Formula One. BDO players Scott Mitchell, Tony O'Shea, Deta Hedman and Trina Gulliver also contributed to the commentary.
