= Tony West (darts player) =

English darts player

Personal information
- Nicknames: The Tornado; Triple T
- Born: 7 July 1972 (age 54) Waltham Abbey, Essex, England
- Home town: Waltham Abbey, Essex, England

Sport
- Sport: Darts
- Playing since: 1990
- Darts: 23 Gram B&W Tony West
- Laterality: Right-handed
- Walk-on music: "Song 2" by Blur

Organisation (see split in darts)
- BDO: 2002–2012
- PDC: 2012–2016

WDF major events – best performances
- World Championship: Last 16: 2004, 2005, 2010
- World Masters: Winner (1) 2003
- World Trophy: Quarter Final: 2003
- Int. Darts League: Last 16 Group: 2004
- Finder Masters: Quarter Final: 2004

PDC premier events – best performances
- UK Open: Last 128: 2013

Other tournament wins
- Years
Antwerp Open	2011
Belgium Open	2003, 2007
Luxembourg Open	2010
Swiss Open	2004
Welsh Masters	2010

Other achievements
- Granite City Open 2006; Jackpot 7 Dutch darts competition 2010; Open Kennemerland 2012; Open Marienheem 2010; Wilke Open 2010

Tony West (born 7 July 1972) is an English former professional darts player.

== Darts career ==
=== BDO career ===
==== Winmau World Masters ====
West's biggest successes have come at the Winmau World Masters. He reached the final in 2002 but was beaten by 7-4 by Mark Dudbridge. In 2003, he made the semi-finals where he played Ted Hankey. Hankey went 5–4 in front in their best of 11 match, and started celebrating after making a high outshot to win the set. However, this proved premature as West recovered to win the match 6–5. In the final, West played Raymond van Barneveld, who had won the year's three preceding Grand Slam events and was looking to complete his set. It looked likely as van Barneveld took an early lead, but West improved his form and took it to a deciding set. At 5–4 to West in the set they were within one leg of playing a sudden-death leg, but West managed to break van Barneveld's throw and win the title.

==== BDO World Championship ====
West reached the last 16 of the 2004 BDO World Championship, where he lost to eventual champion Andy Fordham.

Since 2004, West's form has slumped somewhat and he failed to qualify for the 2007, 2008 and 2009 World Championships. He did however qualify for the 2010 tournament, reaching the second round before losing to Dave Chisnall. In 2011 he lost in the first round to champion Martin Adams, while the following year he lost at the same stage to Belgian Geert De Vos.

==== Other events ====
West has won one Open event, the Portland Open in 2004, and one pairs Open event, also at the Portland Open in 2006.

=== PDC career ===
In January 2012, he entered the Professional Darts Corporation Pro Tour 'Q School' qualifying tournament, one of several BDO players to do so, including his brother Steve and Dean Winstanley. On the first day of 'Q School', West beat Keegan Brown 6–4 to gain a 2012 PDC ProTour Card, gaining him automatic access to all UK Open qualifiers, Players Championship and European Tour events. In his first 19 events on the PDC tour West's best finishes were two last 32 exits in Pro Tour events. In August, he beat Daniel Day and Jim Walker in the UK Qualifier for the European Tour Event 4, and in the first round in Stuttgart, West enjoyed a 6–5 victory over world number 11 Justin Pipe in the first round. He played fellow qualifier Terry Temple in round two and won 6–4, before claiming the biggest win of his PDC career to date when he defeated Terry Jenkins 6–4 to advance to his first ever PDC quarter-final. He played reigning two-time world champion Adrian Lewis and lost 3–6. West also qualified for the fifth European Tour Event of the year, the Dutch Darts Masters, and was narrowly beaten 5–6 by Brendan Dolan in the first round. He finished 52nd on the 2012 ProTour Order of Merit, just £400 short of claiming one of the sixteen spots awarded to the highest non-qualified players for the 2013 World Championship.

West lost 5–3 to Jake Pennington in the first round of the 2013 UK Open. He only played in six more events in the rest of the year and finished it outside the top 64 meaning he needed to enter Q School to regain his place. However, the Netherlands-based West decided not to register for the event and instead concentrated on European Tour tournaments in 2014. He entered three qualifiers and failed to reach the main event in all of them.

West qualified for the 2016 European Darts Grand Prix, his first European tour event in three years, and beat Jeffrey de Graaf 6–2, before losing 6–3 to Michael Smith. He also played in the German Darts Championship and met brother Steve in the first round, who averaged 109.98 in a 6–0 whitewash.

== World Championship results ==
=== BDO ===
- 2004: Second round: (lost to Andy Fordham 0–3)
- 2005: Second round: (lost to Robert Thornton 0–3)
- 2006: First round: (lost to Tony O'Shea 1–3)
- 2010: Second round: (lost to Dave Chisnall 2–4)
- 2011: First round: (lost to Martin Adams1–3)
- 2012: First round: (lost to Geert De Vos 1–3)

== Performance timeline ==
Tournament	2002	2003	2004	2005	2006	2007	2008	2009	2010	2011	2012	2013
BDO World Championship	DNP	DNQ	2R	2R	1R	DNQ			2R	1R	1R	DNP
International Darts League	NH	1R	2R	1R	DNP		Not held					
World Darts Trophy	DNP	QF	2R	2R	DNP		Not held					
Winmau World Masters	RU	W	L16	L128	L192	L72	L40	L40	L16	QF	DNP	
Zuiderduin Masters	DNQ	RR	QF	RR	NH	DNQ		RR	RR	RR	DNQ	
UK Open	NH	DNP									Prel.	1R

Performance Table Legend
DNP	Did not play at the event	DNQ	Did not qualify for the event	NYF	Not yet founded	L#	lost in the early rounds of the tournament (WR = Wildcard round, RR = Round robin)
QF	lost in the quarter-finals	SF	lost in the semi-finals	RU	lost in the final	W	won the tournament
