= Jim Widmayer =

American darts player (born 1969)

Personal information
- Nickname: "Captain America"
- Born: August 23, 1969 (age 57) Staten Island, New York, United States
- Home town: Parrish, Florida, United States

Sport
- Sport: Darts
- Playing since: 1989
- Darts: 22 gram G-Force
- Laterality: Right-handed
- Walk-on music: "Enter Sandman" by Metallica

Organisation (see split in darts)
- BDO: 2008–2020
- PDC: 1994–2007
- WDF: 2008–
- Current world ranking: (WDF) 84 ▼12 (17 August 2026)

WDF major events – best performances
- World Championship: Last 16: 2015, 2023
- World Masters: Last 24: 2011
- World Trophy: Last 16: 2014, 2015
- Finder Masters: Last 24: 2013

PDC premier events – best performances
- World Matchplay: Last 32: 1994
- US Open/WSoD: Last 16: 2007

Other tournament wins
- Years
Cherry Bomb Int'l	2008, 2017
Cleveland Extravaganza	2018
Las Vegas Open	2022
Metroplex Open	2013
Seacoast Open	2013
Syracuse Open	1993, 1996, 2016
White Mountain	2009, 2010, 2013, 2014
Washington Open	2013, 2019
Witch City Open	2018

Jim Widmayer (born August 23, 1969) is an American professional darts player who currently plays in World Darts Federation (WDF) events. He has competed in Professional Darts Corporation (PDC) tournaments in the past. Two-time WDF Americas Cup medalist. He advanced to the WDF World Darts Championship four times.

== Career ==
Widmayer played in the inaugural World Matchplay in 1994, losing 6–8 in the first round to Keith Deller.

Prior to the 2011 Winmau World Masters, Widmayer damaged his arm whilst clearing fallen trees in the wake of Hurricane Irene. His injuries were not serious, and he went on to reach the televised stages of the tournament. In the last 24, he lost 2–3 in sets to Rick Hofstra after missing seven match darts.

Widmayer qualified for the 2014 World Championship and entered in the preliminary stage, where he upset Garry Thompson 3–2 in sets. He played world number one Stephen Bunting in the first round and lost by 3 sets to 1.

In the 2015 World Championship, Widmayer again entered in the preliminary stage, where he fought back to beat Rhys Hayden 3–2 in sets after being 2–0 down. His reward was a tie in the first round against Rick Hofstra, who he lost to in the last 24 of the World Masters in 2011. He gained his revenge with a 3–1 victory, setting himself up with a tie against Martin Adams in the second round, which he lost 4–0.

== World Championship results ==
=== BDO/WDF ===
- 2014: First round (lost to Stephen Bunting 1–3) (sets)
- 2015: Second round (lost to Martin Adams 0–4)
- 2019: Preliminary round (lost to Nigel Heydon 2–3)
- 2023: Third round (lost to Jonny Tata 0-3)
