= Yordi Meeuwisse =

Dutch darts player

Personal information
- Nickname: "Magic"
- Born: 31 January 1988 (age 38) The Hague, Netherlands

Sport
- Sport: Darts
- Playing since: 2005
- Darts: 22 Gram
- Laterality: Right-handed
- Walk-on music: "The Hum" by Dimitri Vegas & Like Mike Ft. Ummet Ozcan

Organisation (see split in darts)
- BDO: 2009–2015
- PDC: 2016–2020

WDF major events – best performances
- World Masters: Last 48: 2013
- Finder Masters: Last 24 Group: 2013, 2014

PDC premier events – best performances
- World Championship: Last 96: 2019
- UK Open: Last 64: 2017

Other tournament wins
- Tournament: Years
- Sunparks Masters: 2015

Yordi Meeuwisse (born 31 January 1988) is a Dutch former professional darts player who has competed in the Professional Darts Corporation (PDC) events.

== Career ==
=== BDO ===
In 2013, Meeuwisse made his television debut at the Zuiderduin Masters. In his first group match he lost to Ross Montgomery 5–2. Meeuwisse booked an impressive win over Robbie Green 5–4 in the second game. However, it was not enough to come through the group stage. Yordi was also qualified for the Zuiderduin Masters of 2014. After beating Co Stompé 5–2 in his first match, he lost to Tony O'Shea 5–3 in the second game.

In 2015 Meeuwisse won the Sunparks Masters, having beaten the Lakeside champion Scott Mitchell 3–0 in the final.

=== PDC ===
In January 2016, Meeuwisse entered PDC Qualifying School. After losing in the final round on the second day, Meeuwisse secured a tour card by winning the final round on the last day. He qualified for the UK Open, where he lost 6–3 to Robbie Green in the second round. Meeuwisse qualified for his first European Tour event in September, the International Darts Open. In the first round he trailed 5–2 to Brendan Dolan, but managed to win 6–5. He received a bye into the third round after Daryl Gurney withdrew and averaged 100.49 during a 6–2 win over Ryan Meikle to play in his first quarter-final, but lost 6–1 to Mensur Suljović.

In October 2018, Meeuwisse qualified for the PDC World Championship by winning the Western Europe Qualifier. A first round loss at Alexandra Palace to William O'Connor was followed by a visit to PDC European Q-School by Meeuwisse in January 2019.

He was unable to secure one of the four direct Tour Cards on offer, but Meeuwisse finished third on the Order of Merit to seal a PDC Tour Card for the first time and at least two years on the PDC ProTour.

Meeuwisse left of the PDC in November 2020.

== World Championship results ==
=== PDC ===
- 2019: 1st round: (lost to William O'Connor 0–3) (sets)
