= Remco van Eijden =

Dutch darts player

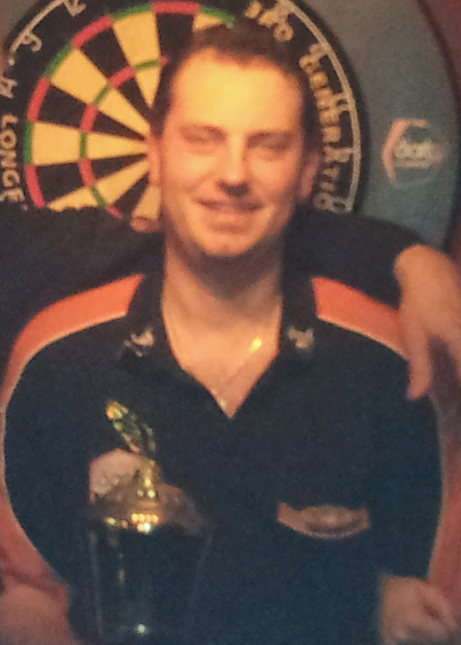
- Van Eijden in 2012

Personal information
- Born: 12 September 1977 (age 49) Amsterdam, Netherlands
- Home town: Zaandam, Netherlands

Sport
- Sport: Darts
- Playing since: 1993
- Darts: 23 gram D'art9 Smooth
- Laterality: Right-handed
- Walk-on music: "Rebirth" by Ran-D

Organisation (see split in darts)
- BDO: 2004–2008, 2012–2015
- PDC: 2008–2011, 2016

WDF major events – best performances
- World Championship: Last 16: 2008
- World Masters: Quarter-Final: 2013
- World Trophy: Last 32: 2007, 2015
- Finder Masters: Quarter-Final: 2007, 2012

PDC premier events – best performances
- World Championship: Last 64: 2009
- European Championship: Last 32: 2009

Other tournament wins
- Tournament: Years
- Austria Open Vienna Austrian Open French Open Hungarian Open Swiss Open: 2013; 2006; 2014; 2007; 2013, 2014

Other achievements
- Belgium Open Warm Up 2010; Open Zuid Oost Netherland 2007
- Updated on 26 March 2019

Remco van Eijden (born 12 September 1977) is a retired Dutch darts player.

== Career ==
Van Eijden previously played in the British Darts Organisation and he played in the 2008 BDO World Darts Championship, beating fellow Dutchman Mario Robbe in the first round, only to lost in the second round to third seed Scott Waites.

In November 2008, van Eijden began playing on the PDC circuit, playing in the two PDPA Players Championships in the Netherlands, reaching the quarter-finals in the second event. He then reached the third round of the PDC German Darts Championship. He then played in the 2009 PDC World Darts Championship having been offered and accepted an SBS6 wildcard. The wildcard originally went to Co Stompé, but after winning the German Darts Championship, Stompé qualified as the top Continental player in the PDC Order of Merit and van Eijden was given the spot instead. By accepting the wildcard, van Eijden also joined the PDC circuit full-time. He defeated Russian ladies champion Anastasia Dobromyslova in the preliminary round and then faced 30th seed Tony Eccles in the first round. He came from two sets down to level at two apiece before eventually losing three sets to two.

Van Eijden played in the PDC European circuit and played in events in the Netherlands, Germany and Austria. He qualified the 2009 European Championship but lost in the first round to Andy Hamilton.

After failing to qualify for the 2010 PDC World Darts Championship through the European Order of Merit, van Eijden returned to the BDO/WDF circuit. He reached the semi-finals of the Scottish Open and the quarter-finals of the Finnish Open. In 2013 he won the Swiss Open against Geert de Vos in the final. The next year, he won the French Open.

Van Eijden was seeded ninth for the 2014 BDO World Darts Championship but lost to compatriot and playing partner Rick Hofstra 3–0 in the first round, failing to win a single leg in the match. He competed in the 2015 BDO World Darts Championship as the number 13 seed, but again lost in the first round, this time to Belgium's Geert De Vos 3–1 in sets.

== World Championships results ==
=== BDO ===
- 2008: 2nd round (lost to Scott Waites 2–4)
- 2014: 1st round (lost to Rick Hofstra 0–3)
- 2015: 1st round (lost to Geert De Vos 1–3)

=== PDC ===
- 2009: 1st round (lost to Tony Eccles 2–3)
