= Rick Hofstra =

Dutch darts player

Personal information
- Born: 21 April 1977 (age 49) The Hague, Netherlands
- Home town: Sneek, Netherlands

Sport
- Sport: Darts
- Playing since: 1996
- Darts: 23 Gram John Part
- Laterality: Right-handed
- Walk-on music: "Tsunami" by DVBBS & Borgeous ft. Tinie Tempah

Organisation (see split in darts)
- BDO: 2001–2019

WDF major events – best performances
- World Championship: Quarter-final: 2014
- World Masters: Quarter-final: 2004
- World Trophy: Last 32: 2003, 2004, 2015
- Int. Darts League: Last 16 Group: 2003
- Finder Masters: Semi-final: 2003

Other tournament wins
- Tournament: Years
- German Gold Cup Muensterland Trophy: 2013; 2014

Other achievements
- Limburgse Open 2010; Open Roden 2013; Open Zuid Netherland 2008

Rick Hofstra (born 21 April 1977) is a Dutch former professional darts player.

== Career ==
Hofstra reached the quarter-finals of the 2001 Belgium Open and the 2002 Swiss Open before making his major debut in the 2003 International Darts League, where he beat Scotland's Bob Taylor in his opening group game before losing to Raymond van Barneveld. Hofstra then beat Co Stompé to qualify for the second group stage where he lost all three group games to Andy Fordham, Tony David and Jarkko Komula. He then lost in the first round of the 2003 World Darts Trophy, losing to Tony West and then lost in the first round of the 2003 Winmau World Masters to Martin Adams.

Hofstra qualified for the 2004 BDO World Darts Championship, losing 3–1 to Mervyn King in controversial circumstances. With the match tied at one set all, King complained that the oche was not the correct length. With the players off the stage, officials checked the length and the match resumed with King taking the next two sets to win 3–1. After first round exits in the 2004 International Darts League and the World Darts Trophy, Hofstra reached the quarter-finals of the 2004 World Masters, beating Paul Hanvidge and then upsetting van Barneveld before losing to David.

Hofstra returned to the Lakeside for the 2005 BDO World Darts Championship, this time taking one of the automatic places meaning he avoided having to qualify. He was beaten in the first round by 4th seed West 3–2. Since then however, Hofstra has not done well in the circuit with only a semi final place in the unranked Spring Cup in 2005 to his credit. In 2007, Hofstra began playing in PDC events, reaching the last 32 of the second PDPA Players Championship Holland event. He currently plays in the Nederlandse Darts Bond, an affiliation of the BDO and won the Open Zuid Netherland in 2008.

Hofstra qualified for the 2014 World Championship where he played his practice partner Remco van Eijden and whitewashed him 3–0 in sets and 9–0 in legs, averaging over 90 and hitting all but five of his darts at double. He then received a bye to the quarter-finals when his second round opponent, Martin Atkins, withdrew from their match with an elbow injury while Hofstra was leading 2–0 in sets. In the quarter-final, Hofstra led top seed Stephen Bunting 2–0 but missed two darts to lead 3–1, then at 3–2 down on a 64 checkout attempt missed the board when trying to set up a dart at double to level the match. Bunting eventually won 5–2 and went on to win the title.

Hofstra again qualified for the 2015 World Championship, where he lost 3–1 against Jim Widmayer in the first round, who had beaten Rhys Hayden in his preliminary round match.

== World Championship results ==
=== BDO ===
- 2004: 1st round (lost to Mervyn King 1–3)
- 2005: 1st round (lost to Tony West 2–3)
- 2014: Quarter-final (lost to Stephen Bunting 2–5)
- 2015: 1st round (lost to Jim Widmayer 1–3)
