= Nick Kenny (darts player) =

Welsh darts player (born 1993)

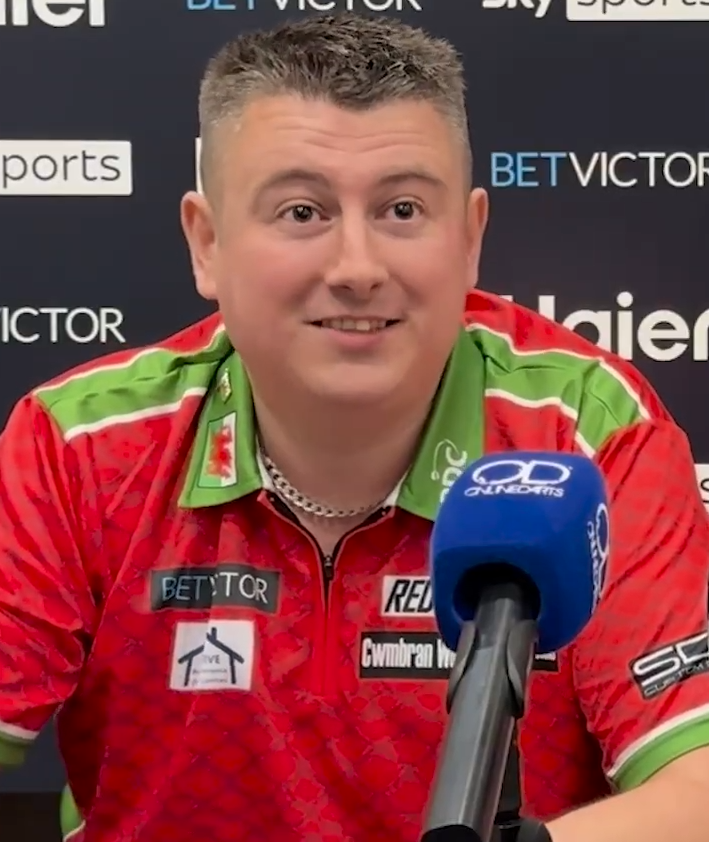
- Kenny with Wales at the 2026 PDC World Cup of Darts

Personal information
- Born: 13 March 1993 (age 33) Newport, Wales
- Home town: Cwmbran, Wales

Sport
- Sport: Darts
- Playing since: 2008
- Darts: 20g Red Dragon Signature
- Laterality: Right-handed
- Walk-on music: "Song 2" by Blur

Organisation (see split in darts)
- BDO: 2010–2020
- PDC: 2020–present (Tour Card: 2020–2021; 2023–present)
- WDF: 2010–2020, 2022
- Current world ranking: (PDC) 64 ▲1 (29 October 2026)

WDF major events – best performances
- World Championship: Last 32: 2017, 2018, 2020
- World Masters: Quarter-final: 2022
- World Trophy: Semi-final: 2017

PDC premier events – best performances
- World Championship: Last 32: 2025
- UK Open: Last 64: 2024, 2025
- PC Finals: Last 32: 2025

Other tournament wins
- Years
BDO International Open	2016
British Internationals	2016
Belgium Open	2019
Bruges Open	2019
Cambridgeshire Open	2014
French Open	2019
Helvetia Open	2018
Jersey Open	2016
Romanian Open	2020
Worthington Champions	2024
Youth
PDC Development Tour	2014 (x2)
Medal record
Men's Darts
Representing Wales
WDF World Cup
Gold medal – first place	2019 Cluj	Men's team
Silver medal – second place	2019 Cluj	Men's overall
Bronze medal – third place	2019 Cluj	Men's singles
WDF Europe Cup
Bronze medal – third place	2022 Gandía	Men's pairs
Bronze medal – third place	2022 Gandía	Men's overall
WDF Europe Cup Youth
Gold medal – first place	2010 Kirchheim	Boys singles
Bronze medal – third place	2010 Kirchheim	Boys overall

Nick Kenny (born 13 March 1993) is a Welsh professional darts player who competes in Professional Darts Corporation (PDC) events. He is a multi-medallist in both the WDF World Cup and the WDF Europe Cup and won 2 titles on the PDC Development Tour. He also reached the quarter-finals at the 2022 World Masters and the semi finals at the 2017 BDO World Trophy. He has competed in seven World Championships (three BDO, and four PDC), reaching the last 32 on four occasions.

== Career ==
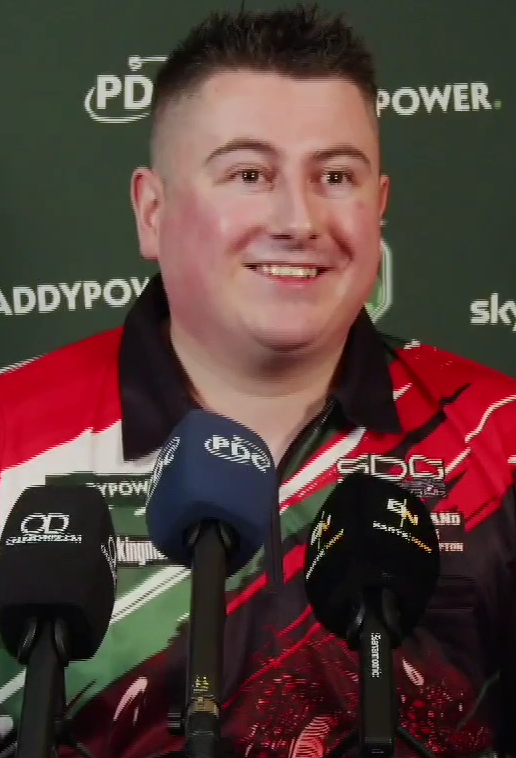
Kenny in 2024

Kenny won the WDF Europe Youth Cup Singles in 2010. In 2016, he qualified for the BDO World Trophy but was defeated by Mark McGeeney 7–6 in the last 16 of the competition, having beaten fifth seed Wesley Harms in the first round. Kenny faced first seed Glen Durrant in the first round of the 2017 BDO World Darts Championship, losing 3–1 in sets.

Kenny won a two-year PDC Tour Card on the final day of 2020's Q-School. He made his UK Open debut at the 2020 event, where he was eliminated in the second round. He was unable to qualify for any major events other than the World Championship, through the PDPA UK Qualifier, defeating James Wilson 7–6 to make his debut at the Alexandra Palace. In the first round he faced Dutchman Derk Telnekes and won 3–2 in a deciding set. In the second round, he lost to Jermaine Wattimena, 3–1 in sets. After his first year with a PDC Tour Card, Kenny had earned £23,000 in ranking money and ended the year 89th on the PDC Order of Merit.

In 2021, he played at the 2021 UK Open, where he was seeded into the second round. There he defeated Ryan Meikle 6–5 in a deciding leg. In the third round he lost to Kai Fan Leung 6–5 in another last leg decider. Kenny secured his spot at the 2022 PDC World Darts Championship through the PDPA Tour Card Holder Qualifier, defeating Gordon Mathers 7–3 in his final match.

Being outside of the top 64 of the PDC Order of Merit before the World Championship, Kenny had to win a his first round game in order to keep alive the chances of keeping his Tour Card. However he was whitewashed 3–0 by Rowby-John Rodriguez, ending the year 74th on the Order of Merit, therefore losing his Tour Card.

On 15 January 2023, Kenny regained a two-year PDC Tour Card on the final day of Q-School, finishing 4th in the UK Q-School Order of Merit.

Kenny replaced Dom Taylor at the 2024 Players Championship Finals after Taylor was suspended by the Darts Regulation Authority (DRA) for failing a drugs test. In the first round, he lost 6–5 to Michael Smith. Kenny qualified for the 2025 PDC World Darts Championship, where he beat Stowe Buntz 3–0 in the first round before eliminating five-time World Champion Raymond van Barneveld 3–1 in the next round, meaning he would keep his Tour Card. Kenny lost to defending champion Luke Humphries 4–0 in the third round.

In March 2025, Kenny signed for Red Dragon Darts.

== World Championship results ==
=== BDO ===
- 2017: First round (lost to Glen Durrant 1–3)
- 2018: First round (lost to Willem Mandigers 0–3)
- 2020: First round (lost to Dennie Olde Kalter 2–3)

=== PDC ===
- 2021: Second round (lost to Jermaine Wattimena 1–3)
- 2022: First round (lost to Rowby-John Rodriguez 0–3)
- 2025: Third round (lost to Luke Humphries 0–4)
- 2026: First round (lost to Justin Hood 0–3)

== Performance timeline ==
=== BDO ===
Tournament	2012	2013	2014	2015	2016	2017	2018	2019	2020
BDO Ranked televised events
World Championship	Did not qualify					1R	1R	DNQ	1R
World Trophy	Not held		DNQ		2R	SF	DNQ	2R	NH
World Masters	L272	L144	L16	L144	L272	L32	L272	DNP	NH

=== PDC ===
Tournament	2011	2012	2015	2016	2020	2021	2022	2023	2024	2025	2026
PDC Ranked televised events
World Championship	Did not participate				BDO	2R	1R	DNP	DNQ	3R	1R
World Masters	NH		Did not qualify							Prel.	Prel.
UK Open	Did not participate				2R	3R	DNP	2R	4R	4R	3R
Players Championship Finals	Did not participate				DNQ		DNP	DNQ	1R	2R	
PDC Non-ranked televised events
World Cup	Did not participate										QF
World Youth Championship	1R	2R	2R	1R	Did not participate						
Career statistics
Season-end ranking	Not ranked				89	74	NR	130	65	59	

=== PDC European Tour ===
Tournament	2023	2024	2025	2026
Austrian Darts Open	2R	DNQ	DNQ	1R
German Darts Championship	DNQ	QF	DNQ	NH
Swiss Darts Trophy	NH	DNQ	DNQ	1R
Dutch Darts Championship	DNQ	DNQ	DNQ	1R

=== PDC Players Championships ===
Season	1	2	3	4	5	6	7	8	9	10	11	12	13	14	15	16	17	18	19	20	21	22	23	24	25	26	27	28	29	30	31	32	33	34
2020	BAR; 4R	BAR; 2R	WIG; 1R	WIG; 4R	WIG; 1R	WIG; 1R	BAR; 2R	BAR; 1R	MIL; 1R	MIL; 1R	MIL; 1R	MIL; 1R	MIL; 1R	NIE; 1R	NIE; 1R	NIE; SF	NIE; 1R	NIE; 1R	COV; 1R	COV; 1R	COV; 1R	COV; 2R	COV; 2R											
2021	BOL; 2R	BOL; 1R	BOL; 1R	BOL; 3R	MIL; 2R	MIL; 1R	MIL; 1R	MIL; 1R	NIE; 3R	NIE; 1R	NIE; 2R	NIE; 1R	MIL; 2R	MIL; 1R	MIL; 1R	MIL; 1R	COV; 1R	COV; 1R	COV; 1R	COV; 2R	BAR; 1R	BAR; 1R	BAR; 1R	BAR; 4R	BAR; 1R	BAR; 2R	BAR; 1R	BAR; 2R	BAR; 2R	BAR; 2R				
2022 (Note: Not a Tour card holder)	Did not participate																																	
2023	BAR; 2R	BAR; 3R	BAR; 1R	BAR; 1R	BAR; DNP		HIL; 1R	HIL; 1R	WIG; 1R	WIG; 1R	LEI; 1R	LEI; 2R	HIL; 2R	HIL; 2R	LEI; 1R	LEI; 1R	HIL; 3R	HIL; 3R	BAR; 1R	BAR; DNP		BAR; 1R	BAR; 1R	BAR; 1R	BAR; 2R	BAR; 2R	BAR; 3R	BAR; 1R	BAR; 1R	BAR; 2R				
2024	WIG; QF	WIG; 1R	LEI; 1R	LEI; 2R	HIL; 2R	HIL; 1R	LEI; 2R	LEI; 1R	HIL; 2R	HIL; 1R	HIL; 3R	HIL; 1R	MIL; 3R	MIL; 2R	MIL; 1R	MIL; 1R	MIL; 4R	MIL; 1R	MIL; 3R	WIG; 1R	WIG; 2R	LEI; 2R	LEI; 1R	WIG; 2R	WIG; 1R	WIG; 2R	WIG; 2R	WIG; 1R	LEI; 1R	LEI; 2R				
2025	WIG; 2R	WIG; 4R	ROS; SF	ROS; 4R	LEI; 1R	LEI; 1R	HIL; 3R	HIL; 4R	LEI; 1R	LEI; 2R	LEI; 1R	LEI; 1R	ROS; 3R	ROS; 2R	HIL; 2R	HIL; 1R	LEI; 1R	LEI; 1R	LEI; 2R	HIL; 2R	HIL; 1R	MIL; 1R	MIL; 1R	MIL; 4R	HIL; 1R	HIL; 1R	LEI; 2R	LEI; 3R	LEI; 2R	WIG; 1R	WIG; 1R	WIG; 2R	WIG; 1R	WIG; 3R
2026	HIL; 3R	HIL; 3R	WIG; 1R	WIG; 1R	LEI; 2R	LEI; 1R	LEI; 2R	LEI; 1R	WIG; 2R	WIG; 2R	MIL; 1R	MIL; 2R	HIL; 1R	HIL; 1R	LEI; 3R	LEI; 2R	LEI; 1R	LEI; 2R	MIL; 1R	MIL; 1R	WIG; 1R	WIG; 1R	LEI; 1R	LEI; 2R	HIL; 2R	HIL; 2R	LEI; 3R	LEI; 2R	ROS; 1R	ROS; 1R	ROS; 1R	ROS; 3R	LEI; 1R	LEI; 3R

Performance Table Legend
W	Won the tournament	F	Finalist	SF	Semifinalist	QF	Quarterfinalist	#R; RR; L#	Lost in # round Round-robin; Last # stage	DQ	Disqualified
DNQ	Did not qualify	DNP	Did not participate	WD	Withdrew	NH	Tournament not held	#R; RR; L#	Lost in # round Round-robin; Last # stage	NYF	Not yet founded
