= Willem Mandigers =

Dutch darts player

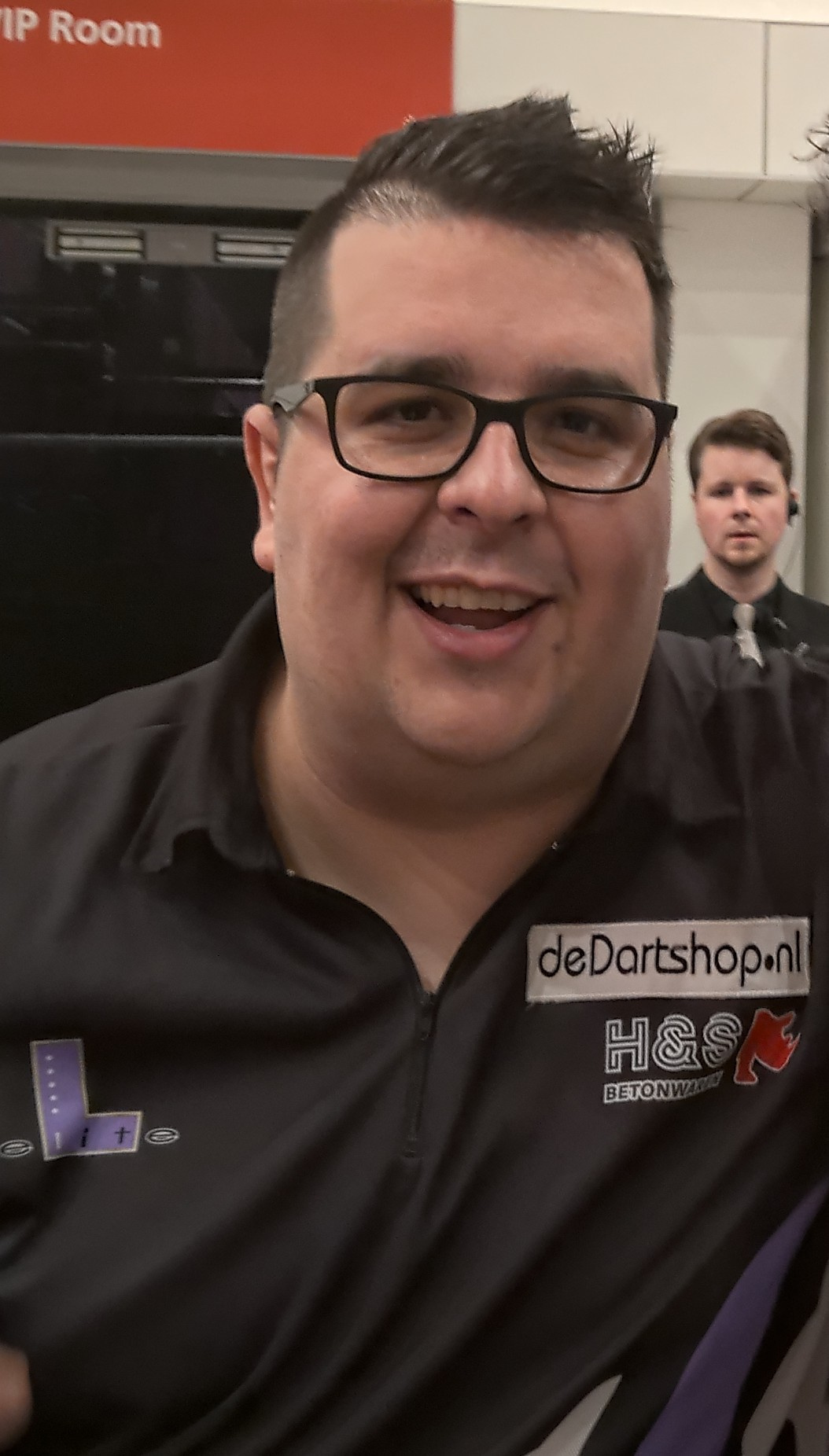
- Mandigers in 2020

Personal information
- Born: 4 June 1989 (age 37) Eindhoven, Netherlands
- Home town: Eindhoven, Netherlands

Sport
- Sport: Darts
- Playing since: 2006
- Darts: 23 Gram Datadart Darryl Fitton
- Laterality: Right-handed
- Walk-on music: "Tremor" by Dimitri Vegas & Like Mike

Organisation (see split in darts)
- BDO: 2009–2020
- WDF: 2009–

WDF major events – best performances
- World Championship: Quarter-final: 2019
- World Masters: Last 16: 2014, 2018, 2019
- World Trophy: Last 16: 2017, 2019
- Finder Masters: Quarter-final: 2017

Other tournament wins
- Tournament: Years
- Denmark Open Turkish Masters Turkish Open: 2018; 2017; 2014

Willem Mandigers (born 4 June 1989) is a Dutch professional darts player who competes in World Darts Federation events.

== Career ==
Mandigers won the Turkish Open in 2014. At the 2014 World Masters he lost to Robbie Green in the first round 3–1. He qualified for the 2015 BDO World Darts Championship through the WDF regional qualifiers, he played Daniel Larsson in the Preliminary round and lost 3–1 in sets. He lost to Martin Phillips in the first round of the 2015 BDO World Trophy 6–3. At the 2015 World Masters he lost to Mark McGeeney in the first round 3–0. He qualified for the 2016 BDO World Darts Championship and lost to eventual champion Scott Waites in the first round. He was defeated by Krzysztof Ratajski in the preliminary round in 2017, but after a good season in which Mandigers once again won a tournament in Turkey, he won his first game at Lakeside in 2018 with a 3–0 win over Nick Kenny to reach the last 16.

== World Championship results ==
=== BDO ===
- 2015: Preliminary Round (lost to Daniel Larsson 1–3)
- 2016: 1st Round (lost to Scott Waites 0–3)
- 2017: Preliminary Round (lost to Krzysztof Ratajski 2–3)
- 2018: 2nd Round (lost to Wayne Warren 2–4)
- 2019: Quarter Final (lost to Michael Unterbuchner 4–5)
- 2020: 1st Round (lost to Michael Unterbuchner 1–3)

== Performance timeline ==
Tournament	2009	2010	2014	2015	2016	2017	2018	2019	2020
BDO World Championship	DNQ		DNQ	Prel.	1R	Prel.	2R	QF	1R
BDO World Trophy	NH		DNQ	1R	DNQ	2R	1R	2R	NH
Winmau World Masters	L136	L136	L16	L32	L144	L32	L16	L16	NH
Finder Darts Masters	DNQ		RR	DNQ		QF	RR	NH	

Performance Table Legend
W	Won the tournament	F	Finalist	SF	Semifinalist	QF	Quarterfinalist	#R; RR; Prel.	Lost in # round Round-robin; Preliminary round	DQ	Disqualified
DNQ	Did not qualify	DNP	Did not participate	WD	Withdrew	NH	Tournament not held	#R; RR; Prel.	Lost in # round Round-robin; Preliminary round	NYF	Not yet founded
