= Lorraine Winstanley =

English darts player (born 1975)

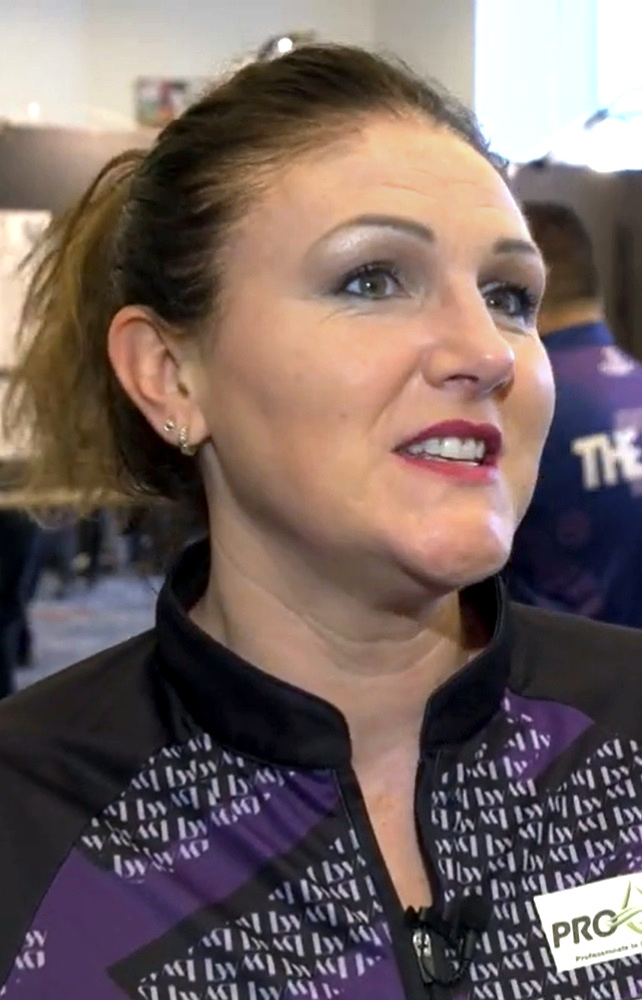
- Winstanley in 2021

Personal information
- Born: 28 October 1975 (age 50) Buxton, Derbyshire, England

Sport
- Sport: Darts
- Playing since: 1996
- Darts: 24g Target Signature
- Laterality: Right-handed
- Walk-on music: "Happy" by Pharrell Williams

Organisation (see split in darts)
- BDO: 2010–2020
- PDC: 2020–
- WDF: 2010–

WDF major events – best performances
- World Championship: Runner-up: 2019
- World Masters: Winner (1): 2017
- World Trophy: Runner-up: 2018
- Finder Masters: Last 6 Group: 2012
- Dutch Open: Runner-up: 2012, 2013, 2016

Other tournament wins
- Tournament: Years
- BDO Gold Cup British Open PDC Women's Series Romanian Open Scottish Open Slovak Open Swedish Open Welsh Masters: 2011; 2011; 2022; 2011; 2010, 2011; 2020; 2013, 2014; 2012

Lorraine Winstanley (née Farlam, born 28 October 1975) is an English darts player who competes in both World Darts Federation (WDF) and Professional Darts Corporation (PDC) events and previously competed in British Darts Organisation (BDO) events. She won her sole BDO major the 2017 World Masters and was the losing finalist at the 2019 BDO World Darts Championship and the 2018 BDO World Trophy.

== Career ==
Winstanley won the 2011 Romanian International Darts Open beating Jane Shearing 5–1 in the final.

She qualified for the 2011 BDO World Darts Championship, where she lost 0–2 to Irina Armstrong in the quarter-finals. The following year, she went one step further by making it through to the semi-finals, where she was defeated by Deta Hedman in a last leg decider. Winstanley made another World Championship quarter-final in 2013, losing 0–2 to Anastasia Dobromyslova. After first-round defeats in 2014 and 2015, Winstanley reached the quarter-finals again in 2016 before being once again being defeated by Hedman.

In 2017, Winstanley won her first major title at the 2017 World Masters, defeating Corrine Hammond 5–2 in the final. Having entered the tournament in the Round of 16, she defeated Rachna David, Dobromyslova and Tricia Wright en route to the final. She followed this success with another World Championship quarter-final in 2018. Later in the year, she reached the final of the World Trophy, losing to Fallon Sherrock 6–3 in the final after beating Paula Jacklin, Anca Zijlstra and Dobromyslova earlier in the tournament.

The 2019 BDO World Championship saw Winstanley's most successful run at Frimley Green, having entered as top seed. She started the tournament by beating Casey Gallagher 2–1, before beating ten-time world champion Trina Gulliver 2–0 in the quarter-final. In the semi-final, she beat long-time rival Dobromyslova to reach the final 2–1 despite losing the first set. In the final, she faced unseeded qualifier Mikuru Suzuki, but was only able to win two legs in the match, losing 3–0. Shortly after the tournament, Winstanley announced that she would compete in the Professional Darts Corporation (PDC) Q-School tournament to try and earn a PDC Tour Card, but was unsuccessful and continued competing in the BDO.

In 2020, she was unable to match her 2019 World Championship performance, losing to Lisa Ashton in the quarter-final. Following the collapse of the BDO, Winstanley did not compete in a World Championship in 2021, but in the first edition of the successor tournament, the 2022 WDF World Championship, she reached the semi-finals before losing to eventual champion Beau Greaves.

During the collapse of the BDO in 2020, Winstanley also began competing on the PDC Challenge Tour and the PDC Women's Series. She won her first PDC event in 2022, defeating Rhian O'Sullivan in the final of event 10. Her Women's Series performances in the first half of 2022 led to her qualification for the inaugural Women's World Matchplay. Winstanley won her quarter-final against Rhian Griffiths 4–3 before losing 2–5 to Fallon Sherrock in the semi-final.

In 2023, Winstanley failed to qualify for the Women's World Matchplay, narrowly missing out on qualification after being overtaken in the qualification race by Noa-Lynn van Leuven in the final Women's Series event of the qualification period. Later in the year, she was knocked out in the quarter-final of the 2023 WDF World Championship by Aileen de Graaf.

After failing to qualify for the 2024 Women's World Matchplay and 2024 WDF World Championship, Winstanley qualified for the 2025 Women's World Matchplay, her first televised major tournament since the 2023 WDF World Championship. She was unable to win a leg in her quarter-final, losing 4–0 to van Leuven.

== World Championship results ==
=== BDO/WDF ===
- 2011: Quarter-finals (lost to Irina Armstrong 0–2)
- 2012: Semi-finals (lost to Deta Hedman 1–2)
- 2013: Quarter-finals (lost to Anastasia Dobromyslova 0–2)
- 2014: First round (lost to Deta Hedman 0–2)
- 2015: First round (lost to Sharon Prins 0–2)
- 2016: Quarter-finals (lost to Deta Hedman 0–2)
- 2017: Quarter-finals (lost to Anastasia Dobromyslova 1–2)
- 2018: Quarter-finals (lost to Anastasia Dobromyslova 0–2)
- 2019: Runner-up (lost to Mikuru Suzuki 0–3)
- 2020: Quarter-finals (lost to Lisa Ashton 0–2)
- 2022: Semi-finals (lost to Beau Greaves 0–3)
- 2023: Quarter-finals (lost to Aileen de Graaf 0–2)

== Performance timeline ==
BDO

Tournament	2011	2012	2013	2014	2015	2016	2017	2018	2019	2020
BDO Ranked televised events
World Championship	QF	SF	QF	1R	1R	QF	QF	QF	F	QF
World Masters	1R	SF	1R	4R	4R	1R	W	QF	SF	NH
Finder Masters	DNQ	RR	DNQ				RR	DNQ	NH	
World Trophy	NH			1R	1R	QF	1R	F	SF	NH

WDF

Tournament	2011	2012	2013	2014	2015	2016	2017	2018	2019	2020	2021	2022	2023	2024
WDF Ranked major/platinum events
World Championship	Not held											SF	QF	DNP
Dutch Open (Note: A non-ranked event until 2020)	QF	F	F	L16	DNP	F	SF	L16	DNP	L16	NH	QF	DNP	L32

PDC

Tournament	2022	2023–2024	2025
PDC Televised women's events
Women's World Matchplay	SF	DNQ	QF

Performance Table Legend
W	Won the tournament	F	Finalist	SF	Semifinalist	QF	Quarterfinalist	#R; RR; L#	Lost in # round Round-robin; Last # stage	DQ	Disqualified
DNQ	Did not qualify	DNP	Did not participate	WD	Withdrew	NH	Tournament not held	#R; RR; L#	Lost in # round Round-robin; Last # stage	NYF	Not yet founded

== Personal life ==
Winstanley is not a full-time professional darts player, and works as a beauty therapist. She is married to fellow darts player Dean Winstanley and has two children from a previous relationship. Her daughter Josie was a contestant on One Hundred and Eighty in 2015, winning £2,400; Lorraine was on her team.
