= Chris Harris (darts player) =

Personal information
- Full name: Christopher Paul Harris
- Nickname: Mr Noisy
- Born: 11 November 1977 (age 48) Abergavenny, Wales
- Home town: Ebbw Vale, Wales

Sport
- Sport: Darts
- Playing since: 1994
- Darts: 24 Gram Harrows Signature
- Laterality: Right-handed
- Walk-on music: "Come With Me" by Special D

Organisation (see split in darts)
- BDO: 2009–2018

WDF major events – best performances
- World Championship: Last 32: 2018
- World Masters: Last 144: 2017

Chris Harris (born 11 November 1977) is a Welsh former professional darts player who competed in British Darts Organisation (BDO) events. He qualified for the 2018 BDO World Darts Championship.

== Career ==
In 2017, Harris reached the Last 144 of the World Masters. He qualified for the 2018 BDO World Darts Championship as one of the Playoff Qualifiers. He played Ümit Uygunsözlü in the preliminary round, winning 3–2. He lost 3–1 to Dean Reynolds in the first round.

== World Championship results ==
=== BDO ===
- 2018: 1st Round (lost to Dean Reynolds 1-3) (sets)
