= 2018 BDO World Darts Championship =

Tournament information
- Dates: 6–14 January 2018
- Venue: Lakeside Country Club
- Location: Frimley Green, Surrey
- Country: England
- Organisation(s): British Darts Organisation (BDO)
- Format: Sets
- Prize fund: £339,000 (total)
- Winner's share: £100,000 (men) £12,000 (women) £5,000 (youth)
- High checkout: 170; Darryl Fitton; Justin van Tergouw

Champion(s)
- Glen Durrant (ENG) (Men); Lisa Ashton (ENG) (Women); Justin van Tergouw (NED) (Youth)

The 2018 BDO World Darts Championship (known for sponsorship reasons as the 2018 Lakeside World Professional Darts Championship) was the 41st World Championship organised by the British Darts Organisation, and the 33rd staging at the Lakeside Country Club at Frimley Green.

Glen Durrant who was the defending men's champion, successfully retained his title, beating Mark McGeeney 7–6 in the final after the match went to a tie break. Durrant became the fifth player to defend a world title following his first win, after Eric Bristow, Raymond van Barneveld, Adrian Lewis and Gary Anderson. McGeeney became the second man, following Mike Gregory in 1992, to lose a world final having had darts at double to win.

Lisa Ashton who was the defending women's champion, also retained her title with a 3–1 win over Anastasia Dobromyslova.

Durrant recorded the tournament's first 100+ match average since 2014 in his quarter-final victory over Jim Williams.

All four men's quarter-finals went to a deciding set, the first time this had happened since the format was changed so that the quarters were played to best of nine sets. The previous year this happened was 1991, when the quarter-finals were best of seven sets.

Michael Unterbuchner became the first German player to reach the semi-finals of the World Championship, but was beaten 6–4 by Mark McGeeney.

== Men's ==
=== Format and qualifiers ===
1–16 in BDO rankings (seeded in first round)

1. (England) Glen Durrant (winner)
2. (England) Mark McGeeney (runner-up)
3. (England) Jamie Hughes (first round)
4. (England) Scott Mitchell (second round)
5. (Scotland) Ross Montgomery (first round)
6. (Belgium) Geert De Vos (second round)
7. (Netherlands) Wesley Harms (first round)
8. (Scotland) Cameron Menzies (first round)
9. (Wales) Jim Williams (quarter-finals)
10. (Netherlands) Willem Mandigers (second round)
11. (Netherlands) Richard Veenstra (quarter-finals)
12. (Wales) Dean Reynolds (second round)
13. (Belgium) Andy Baetens (quarter-finals)
14. (Wales) Martin Phillips (second round)
15. (England) ~~James Hurrell~~ (withdrew) (Note: James Hurrell withdrew from the tournament due to ill health. He was replaced in the draw by the next highest ranked player not qualified, which was Richie Edwards of Wales.)
16. (England) Darryl Fitton (second round)

17–24 in BDO rankings (first round)

17. (Northern Ireland) Kyle McKinstry (first round)
18. (England) Scott Waites (semi-finals)
19. (England) Martin Adams (first round)
20. (Lithuania) Darius Labanauskas (first round)
21. (England) Conan Whitehead (second round)
22. (Wales) Nick Kenny (first round)
23. (England) Scott Baker (first round)
24. (Wales) Wayne Warren (quarter-finals)

25–26 in BDO rankings (preliminary round)

25. (Netherlands) Jeffrey Sparidaans (preliminary round)
26. (England) Gary Robson (first round) (Note: Krzysztof Ratajski, who qualified for the preliminary round as the 2017 World Masters champion, declined his invitation in order to attempt to qualify for the rival 2018 PDC World Darts Championship. Gary Robson, the highest ranked non-qualifier, was invited as a replacement.)

Last Year Finalist not Qualified (preliminary round)

- (Netherlands) Danny Noppert (second round)

Replacement Player (first round)

- (Wales) Richie Edwards (first round)

Regional Table Qualifiers (preliminary round)

- (New Zealand) Craig Caldwell (preliminary round)
- (Canada) David Cameron (preliminary round)
- (United States) Joe Chaney (preliminary round)
- (England) Daniel Day (first round)
- (Netherlands) Chris Landman (preliminary round)
- (Sweden) Dennis Nilsson (first round)
- (Turkey) Ümit Uygunsözlü (preliminary round)

Regional Playoff Qualifiers (preliminary round)

- (Brunei) Pengiran Mohamed (preliminary round)
- (Australia) Justin Thompson (first round)

Bridlington Playoff Qualifiers (preliminary round)

- (Northern Ireland) Chris Gilliland (preliminary round)
- (Wales) Chris Harris (first round)
- (Netherlands) Derk Telnekes (first round)
- (Germany) Michael Unterbuchner (semi-finals)

=== Draw bracket ===
==== Preliminary round ====
All matches are best of 5 sets.

Av.	Player	Score	Player	Av.
84.72	(Alt) Gary Robson (England)	3 – 0	(Brunei) Pengiran Mohamed (Q)	70.35
81.57	(Q) Justin Thompson (Australia)	3 – 2	(Northern Ireland) Chris Gilliland (Q)	80.13
94.89	(WC) Danny Noppert (Netherlands)	3 – 0	(United States) Joe Chaney (Q)	76.08
76.19	(Q) Ümit Uygunsözlü (Turkey)	2 – 3	(Wales) Chris Harris (Q)	75.22
77.42	Jeffrey Sparidaans (Netherlands)	0 – 3	(Sweden) Dennis Nilsson (Q)	92.56
84.67	(Q) Chris Landman (Netherlands)	0 – 3	(Netherlands) Derk Telnekes (Q)	87.16
77.30	(Q) David Cameron (Canada)	2 – 3	(Germany) Michael Unterbuchner (Q)	84.77
80.38	(Q) Craig Caldwell (New Zealand)	0 – 3	(England) Daniel Day (Q)	86.24

==== Last 32 ====
First Round (best of 5 sets); 6–9 January
1	(England) Glen Durrant 95.29	3
Alt	(England) Gary Robson 86.31	0
16	(England) Darryl Fitton 85.51	3
Q	(Australia) Justin Thompson 81.09	2
8	(Scotland) Cameron Menzies 84.66	1
(England) Conan Whitehead 91.86	3
9	(Wales) Jim Williams 81.27	3
Q	(Sweden) Dennis Nilsson 82.42	2
5	(Scotland) Ross Montgomery 90.72	1
(England) Scott Waites 88.89	3
12	(Wales) Dean Reynolds 81.50	3
Q	(Wales) Chris Harris 76.62	1
4	(England) Scott Mitchell 98.70	3
(Lithuania) Darius Labanauskas 99.08	2
13	(Belgium) Andy Baetens 86.73	3
(England) Scott Baker 85.75	2
2	(England) Mark McGeeney 86.19	3
(England) Martin Adams 82.08	2
Alt	(Wales) Richie Edwards 71.51	0
WC	(Netherlands) Danny Noppert 88.92	3
7	(Netherlands) Wesley Harms 90.56	1
(Wales) Wayne Warren 95.07	3
10	(Netherlands) Willem Mandigers 89.58	3
(Wales) Nick Kenny 83.37	0
6	(Belgium) Geert De Vos 87.37	3
Q	(Netherlands) Derk Telnekes 81.73	1
11	(Netherlands) Richard Veenstra 91.88	3
(Northern Ireland) Kyle McKinstry 87.99	2
3	(England) Jamie Hughes 87.14	2
Q	(Germany) Michael Unterbuchner 89.30	3
14	(Wales) Martin Phillips 83.23	3
Q	(England) Daniel Day 79.30	1

Second Round (best of 7 sets); 10–11 January
1	(England) Glen Durrant 99.43	4
16	(England) Darryl Fitton 93.37	1
(England) Conan Whitehead 90.28	3
9	(Wales) Jim Williams 90.18	4
(England) Scott Waites 93.21	4
12	(Wales) Dean Reynolds 94.53	2
4	(England) Scott Mitchell 96.39	2
13	(Belgium) Andy Baetens 94.55	4
2	(England) Mark McGeeney 92.13	4
WC	(Netherlands) Danny Noppert 89.48	1
(Wales) Wayne Warren 88.62	4
10	(Netherlands) Willem Mandigers 87.03	2
6	(Belgium) Geert De Vos 77.37	0
11	(Netherlands) Richard Veenstra 90.85	4
Q	(Germany) Michael Unterbuchner 88.88	4
14	(Wales) Martin Phillips 83.17	2

Quarter-finals (best of 9 sets); 12 January
1	(England) Glen Durrant 100.92	5
9	(Wales) Jim Williams 92.02	4
(England) Scott Waites 92.77	5
13	(Belgium) Andy Baetens 91.86	4
2	(England) Mark McGeeney 91.47	5
(Wales) Wayne Warren 92.67	4
11	(Netherlands) Richard Veenstra 89.66	4
Q	(Germany) Michael Unterbuchner 89.65	5

Semi-finals (best of 11 sets); 13 January
1	(England) Glen Durrant 96.61	6
(England) Scott Waites 94.14	2
2	(England) Mark McGeeney 88.84	6
Q	(Germany) Michael Unterbuchner 88.33	4

Final (best of 13 sets); 14 January
1	(England) Glen Durrant 93.97	7
2	(England) Mark McGeeney 86.31	6

== Women's ==
=== Format and qualifiers ===
1–8 in BDO rankings (seeded)

1. (England) Deta Hedman (semi-final)
2. (Netherlands) Aileen de Graaf (quarter-final)
3. (England) Lorraine Winstanley (quarter-final)
4. (England) Lisa Ashton (winner)
5. (Australia) Corrine Hammond (first round)
6. (Russia) Anastasia Dobromyslova (runner-up)
7. (England) Trina Gulliver (semi-final)
8. (Netherlands) Sharon Prins (quarter-final)

9–14 in BDO rankings

9. (England) Fallon Sherrock (quarter-final)
10. (Netherlands) Anca Zijlstra (first round)
11. (England) Paula Jacklin (first round)
12. (Wales) Rhian Griffiths (first round)
13. (England) Maria O'Brien (first round)
14. (England) Tricia Wright (first round)

Playoff Qualifiers

- (Norway) Rachna David (first round)
- (Sweden) Vicky Pruim (first round)

=== Draw Bracket ===
First Round (best of 3 sets); 6–10 January
1	(England) Deta Hedman 66.96	3	3
Q	(Norway) Rachna David 62.70	1	0
8	(Netherlands) Sharon Prins 71.48	3	3
(England) Maria O'Brien 70.86	1	2
4	(England) Lisa Ashton 77.76	3	3
(Wales) Rhian Griffiths 67.11	2	0
5	(Australia) Corrine Hammond 71.69	2	3	1
(England) Fallon Sherrock 70.68	3	0	3
2	(Netherlands) Aileen de Graaf 72.73	3	3
(England) Paula Jacklin 62.23	0	0
7	(England) Trina Gulliver 80.62	2	3	3
Q	(Sweden) Vicky Pruim 72.00	3	1	0
3	(England) Lorraine Winstanley 80.01	3	3
(England) Tricia Wright 74.83	1	0
6	(Russia) Anastasia Dobromyslova 82.73	3	3
(Netherlands) Anca Zijlstra 75.29	0	0

Quarter-finals (best of 3 sets); 11 January
1	(England) Deta Hedman 78.15	3	3
8	(Netherlands) Sharon Prins 73.90	2	2
4	(England) Lisa Ashton 73.26	3	3
(England) Fallon Sherrock 75.15	1	2
2	(Netherlands) Aileen de Graaf 71.84	1	0
7	(England) Trina Gulliver 77.62	3	3
3	(England) Lorraine Winstanley 67.89	0	0
6	(Russia) Anastasia Dobromyslova 85.08	3	3

Semi-finals (best of 3 sets); 12 January
1	(England) Deta Hedman 82.32	2	2
4	(England) Lisa Ashton 83.14	3	3
7	(England) Trina Gulliver 76.73	2	0
6	(Russia) Anastasia Dobromyslova 84.78	3	3

Final (best of 5 sets); 13 January
4	(England) Lisa Ashton 89.80	0	3	3	3
6	(Russia) Anastasia Dobromyslova 81.83	3	1	0	0

== Youth ==
For the fourth consecutive year, a youth final was played on the Lakeside stage during the Championships. In September 2017, the Youth tournament was played down to the final two. The final took place on 11 January, and was contested between 17 year old defending champion Justin van Tergouw from the Netherlands and 15 year old Killian Heffernan from Ireland. The format was first to three sets.

Av.	Player	Score	Player	Av.
93.04	Justin van Tergouw (Netherlands)	3 – 1	(Republic of Ireland) Killian Heffernan	82.29

== Representation from different countries ==
This tables shows the number of players by country (men and women) in the World Championship, the total number including the preliminary round. Fifteen countries were represented in the World Championship at men competition and seven at the women. Overall seventeen countries competed at the World Championship.

=== Men ===
	(England) ENG	(Netherlands) NED	(Wales) WAL	(Belgium) BEL	(Northern Ireland) NIR	(Scotland) SCO	(Australia) AUS	(Brunei) BRU	(Canada) CAN	(Germany) GER	(Lithuania) LTU	(New Zealand) NZL	(Sweden) SWE	(Turkey) TUR	(United States) USA	Total
Final	2	0	0	0	0	0	0	0	0	0	0	0	0	0	0	2
Semi-final	3	0	0	0	0	0	0	0	0	1	0	0	0	0	0	4
Quarter-final	3	1	2	1	0	0	0	0	0	1	0	0	0	0	0	8
Round 2	6	3	4	2	0	0	0	0	0	1	0	0	0	0	0	16
Round 1	11	5	7	2	1	2	1	0	0	1	1	0	1	0	0	32
Prelim.	2	4	1	0	1	0	1	1	1	1	0	1	1	1	1	16
Total	11	7	7	2	2	2	1	1	1	1	1	1	1	1	1	40

=== Women ===
	(England) ENG	(Netherlands) NED	(Australia) AUS	(Norway) NOR	(Russia) RUS	(Sweden) SWE	(Wales) WAL	Total
Final	1	0	0	0	1	0	0	2
Semi-final	3	0	0	0	1	0	0	4
Quarter-final	5	2	0	0	1	0	0	8
Round 1	8	3	1	1	1	1	1	16
Total	8	3	1	1	1	1	1	16
