= James Hurrell =

English darts player (born 1984)

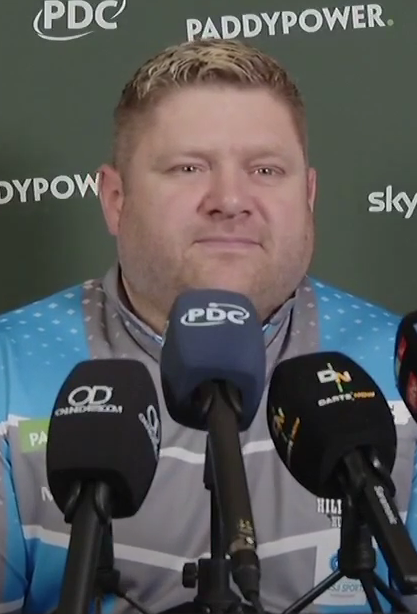
- Hurrell at the 2025 World Championship

Personal information
- Nickname: "Hillbilly"
- Born: 7 July 1984 (age 42) Banbury, Oxfordshire, England
- Home town: Moreton-in-Marsh, England

Sport
- Sport: Darts
- Playing since: 2008
- Darts: 24g Mission
- Laterality: Right-handed
- Walk-on music: "Hillbilly Rock Hillbilly Roll" by The Woolpackers

Organisation (see split in darts)
- BDO: 2010–2020
- PDC: 2020–present (Tour Card: 2024–present)
- WDF: 2010–2023
- Current world ranking: (PDC) 45 ▼1 (29 October 2026)

WDF major events – best performances
- World Championship: Quarter-final: 2022
- World Masters: Quarter-final: 2017
- World Trophy: Last 16: 2017
- Finder Masters: Group Stages: 2015
- Dutch Open: Last 16: 2022

PDC premier events – best performances
- World Championship: Last 16: 2026
- UK Open: Last 128: 2024
- PC Finals: Last 16: 2025
- Masters: Last 32: 2026

Other tournament wins
- Years
BDO International Open	2017
Belfry Open	2022
British Internationals	2015, 2017, 2022
British Pentathlon	2013
Finnish Masters	2015
Isle of Man Classic	2022
Italian Grand Masters	2022
Police Masters	2016, 2017
Scottish Open	2022
PDC Challenge Tour	2023
Medal record
Men's Darts
Representing England
WDF World Cup
Silver medal – second place	2023	Men's team
WDF Europe Cup
Gold medal – first place	2016	Men's team
Gold medal – first place	2022	Men's team
Gold medal – first place	2022	Men's overall

James Hurrell (born 7 July 1984) is an English professional darts player who competes in Professional Darts Corporation (PDC) events and previously competed in British Darts Organisation (BDO) and World Darts Federation (WDF) events. He won the final Challenge Tour event of 2023.

Hurrell reached the quarter-finals at the 2017 World Masters and 2022 WDF Lakeside World Championship. He was ranked WDF world number one from January to November 2022 and is a WDF World Cup silver medalist and a WDF Europe Cup gold medalist.

== Career ==
=== BDO ===
Hurrell reached the Last 32 of the 2015 World Masters, where he played Martin Phillips and lost 3–2 in sets. He qualified for the 2016 BDO World Darts Championship and was beaten by Larry Butler in the preliminary round. In November 2016, he hit a 9-dart finish against Daniel Day at the Jersey Classic. He qualified for the 2018 BDO World Darts Championship but withdrew before the tournament started.

Hurrell came back to form and was ranked world number 1 in the World Darts Federation world rankings between January and November 2022. He reached the final of the Welsh Open, losing to Cameron Menzies in October 2021, and the Italian Masters, losing to Richard Veenstra in November. In March 2022, he won the Isle of Man Classic, beating Luke Littler in the final. He was the number 6 seed in the 2022 WDF World Darts Championship, which took place in April 2022, where he lost 4–0 in sets to Cameron Menzies in the quarter-finals. However, Hurrell picking up the Italian Masters and Scottish Open later in 2022.

=== PDC ===
Hurrell competed for a PDC Tour Card at the 2020 Qualifying School (Q-School), but finished outside the rankings needed to get a PDC Tour Card.

He earned a Tour Card for the first time at the 2024 Q-School by finishing fourth on the UK Q-School Order of Merit.

== World Championship results ==
=== BDO ===
- 2016: Preliminary round (lost to Larry Butler 2–3)
- 2017: First round (lost to Mark McGeeney 1–3)

=== WDF ===
- 2022: Quarter-finals (lost to Cameron Menzies 0–4)
- 2023: Second round (lost to Dennis Nilsson 2–3)

=== PDC ===
- 2025: Second round (lost to Michael van Gerwen 0–3)
- 2026: Fourth round (lost to Ryan Searle 0–4)

== Performance timeline ==
=== BDO ===
Tournament	2010	2013	2014	2015	2016	2017	2018
BDO Ranked televised events
World Championship	Did not qualify				Prel.	1R	WD
World Masters	1R	1R	Prel.	5R	5R	QF	2R
World Trophy	Did not qualify					2R	1R

=== WDF ===
Tournament	2022	2023
WDF Ranked major/platinum events
World Championship	QF	2R
World Masters	RR	NH

=== PDC ===
Tournament	2024	2025	2026
PDC Ranked televised events
World Championship	WDF	2R	4R
World Masters	DNQ		1R
UK Open	2R	2R	3R
Players Championship Finals	1R	3R	
Career statistics
Season-end ranking	79	48	

==== European Tour ====
Tournament	2024	2025	2026
Belgian Open	1R	1R	DNQ
German Grand Prix	DNQ		1R
Austrian Open	DNQ		1R
Baltic Sea Open	DNQ		1R
Hungarian Trophy	DNQ		2R
Flanders Trophy	DNQ		1R

==== Players Championships ====
Season	1	2	3	4	5	6	7	8	9	10	11	12	13	14	15	16	17	18	19	20	21	22	23	24	25	26	27	28	29	30	31	32	33	34
2023 (Note: Not a Tour card holder)	BAR; DNP		BAR; 2R	BAR; DNP			HIL; 2R	HIL; 2R	Did not participate							LEI; 1R	Did not participate								BAR; 1R	BAR; DNP	BAR; 2R	BAR; 3R	BAR; 1R	BAR; 1R				
2024	WIG; QF	WIG; 2R	LEI; 2R	LEI; 1R	HIL; QF	HIL; 1R	LEI; 3R	LEI; 1R	HIL; 2R	HIL; 3R	HIL; 1R	HIL; 1R	MIL; 1R	MIL; 3R	MIL; 1R	MIL; 1R	MIL; QF	MIL; 1R	MIL; 2R	WIG; 1R	WIG; 3R	MIL; 2R	MIL; 1R	WIG; 1R	WIG; 1R	WIG; 2R	WIG; 3R	WIG; 1R	LEI; 3R	LEI; 1R				
2025	WIG; 3R	WIG; 1R	ROS; 1R	ROS; 4R	LEI; 2R	LEI; 3R	HIL; 1R	HIL; 1R	LEI; 2R	LEI; 2R	LEI; 1R	LEI; 1R	ROS; 1R	ROS; 3R	HIL; 1R	HIL; 2R	LEI; 1R	LEI; 3R	LEI; 2R	LEI; 2R	LEI; SF	HIL; 1R	HIL; 1R	MIL; 3R	MIL; 2R	HIL; 2R	HIL; QF	LEI; 1R	LEI; 1R	LEI; 1R	WIG; 3R	WIG; 1R	WIG; 1R	WIG; 2R
2026	HIL; 1R	HIL; 4R	WIG; 1R	WIG; 1R	LEI; 2R	LEI; 1R	LEI; 4R	LEI; 1R	WIG; 3R	WIG; 4R	MIL; 1R	MIL; 1R	HIL; 2R	HIL; 4R	LEI; DNP				MIL; 4R	MIL; 1R	WIG; 3R	WIG; 1R	LEI; 2R	LEI; 3R	HIL; QF	HIL; 2R	LEI; 2R	LEI; 2R	ROS; 1R	ROS; 3R	ROS; 3R	ROS; 1R	LEI; 1R	LEI; 2R

Performance Table Legend
W	Won the tournament	F	Finalist	SF	Semifinalist	QF	Quarterfinalist	#R; RR; Prel.	Lost in # round Round-robin; Preliminary round	DQ	Disqualified
DNQ	Did not qualify	DNP	Did not participate	WD	Withdrew	NH	Tournament not held	#R; RR; Prel.	Lost in # round Round-robin; Preliminary round	NYF	Not yet founded
