= 2016 BDO World Trophy =

Sports Direct BDO World Trophy

Tournament information
- Dates: 28–30 May 2016
- Venue: Lakeside Leisure Complex
- Location: Frimley Green
- Country: England, United Kingdom
- Organisation(s): BDO
- Format: Legs; Finals: best of 25 (men's) best of 13 (women's)
- Prize fund: £78,000 (men), £22,000 (women)
- Winner's share: £20,000 (men), £4,000 (women
- High checkout: 170 (England) Scott Waites (England) Darryl Fitton

Champion(s)
- (England) Darryl Fitton (men) (England) Lisa Ashton (women)

The 2016 Sports Direct BDO World Trophy is a major darts tournament run by the British Darts Organisation, hosted between 28–30 May 2016 at Lakeside Leisure Complex, Frimley Green, Surrey. This event is organized by the British Darts Organisation.

Darryl Fitton won the men's title for the first time, while Lisa Ashton retained the women's title she won the previous year.

== Prize Fund ==
- Winner £20,000 (men), £4,000 (women)
- Runner Up £10,000 (men), £2,000 (women)
- Joint 3rd 2 x £5,000 (men), 2 x £1,500 (women)
- Joint 5th 4 x £2,500 (men), 4 x £1,250 (women)
- Joint 9th 8 x £1,500 (men), 8 x £1,000 (women)
- Joint 17th 16 x £1,000 (men)
- Totals £150.000 (£78,000 men, £22,000 women) Nine dart check-out £50,000

== Qualifiers ==
=== Men ===
Top 16 in Invitational rankings (seeds)
1. (England) Glen Durrant (second round)
2. (England) Martin Adams (second round)
3. (England) Scott Waites (quarter-finals)
4. (England) Jamie Hughes (semi-finals)
5. (Netherlands) Wesley Harms (first round)
6. (Wales) Jim Williams (first round)
7. (England) Scott Mitchell (second round)
8. (England) Darryl Fitton (winner)
9. (Wales) Martin Phillips (second round)
10. (Netherlands) Danny Noppert (quarter-finals)
11. (Netherlands) Richard Veenstra (first round)
12. (England) Mark McGeeney (quarter-finals)
13. (Belgium) Geert De Vos (second round)
14. (England) Brian Dawson (second round)
15. (Wales) Dean Reynolds (semi-finals)
16. (Lithuania) Darius Labanauskas (quarter-finals)

WDF regional qualifiers
1. (Japan) Seigo Asada (first round)
2. (Australia) Peter Machin (runner-up)
3. (Latvia) Madars Razma (first round)
4. (England) Tony O'Shea (second round)
5. (Canada) David Cameron (first round)
6. (Poland) Krzysztof Ratajski (first round)
7. (New Zealand) Craig Caldwell (first round)
8. (United States) Jim Widmayer (first round)
9. (Belgium) Roger Janssen (first round)

Qualifiers
1. (England) Ryan Joyce (first round)
2. (England) Barry Lynn (first round)
3. (Scotland) Ross Montgomery (first round)
4. (Wales) Nick Kenny (second round)

Wildcards
1. (England) Ted Hankey (first round)
2. (England) Andy Fordham (first round)
3. (Canada) Jeff Smith (first round)

== Draw ==
=== Men ===
First Round (best of 11 legs); 28–29 May
1 | (England) Glen Durrant 86.43 | 6
WC | (England) Andy Fordham 80.49 | 2
16 | (Lithuania) Darius Labanauskas 88.05 | 6
Q | (England) Barry Lynn 78.35 | 2
8 | (England) Darryl Fitton 92.71 | 6
Q | (New Zealand) Craig Caldwell 85.60 | 4
9 | (Wales) Martin Phillips 81.94 | 6
WC | (England) Ted Hankey 81.61 | 3
5 | (Netherlands) Wesley Harms 85.63 | 3
Q | (Wales) Nick Kenny 84.40 | 6
12 | (England) Mark McGeeney 86.87 | 6
WC | (Canada) Jeff Smith 86.07 | 2
4 | (England) Jamie Hughes 91.97 | 6
Q | (England) Ryan Joyce 84.64 | 3
13 | (Belgium) Geert De Vos 88.46 | 6
Q | (Belgium) Roger Janssen 80.98 | 4
2 | (England) Martin Adams 88.91 | 6
Q | (Latvia) Madars Razma 78.33 | 1
15 | (Wales) Dean Reynolds 85.30 | 6
Q | (Canada) David Cameron 74.79 | 1
7 | (England) Scott Mitchell 91.31 | 6
Q | (Scotland) Ross Montgomery 96.85 | 5
10 | (Netherlands) Danny Noppert 89.79 | 6
Q | (Japan) Seigo Asada 85.42 | 3
6 | (Wales) Jim Williams 87.06 | 4
Q | (Australia) Peter Machin 94.31 | 6
11 | (Netherlands) Richard Veenstra 79.80 | 4
Q | (England) Tony O'Shea 83.24 | 6
3 | (England) Scott Waites 88.63 | 6
Q | (Poland) Krzysztof Ratajski 86.18 | 4
14 | (England) Brian Dawson 87.69 | 6
Q | (United States) Jim Widmayer 82.63 | 3

Last 16 (best of 13 legs); 29 May
1 | (England) Glen Durrant 104.56 | 3
16 | (Lithuania) Darius Labanauskas 101.44 | 7
8 | (England) Darryl Fitton 91.27 | 7
9 | (Wales) Martin Phillips 81.91 | 3
Q | (Wales) Nick Kenny 93.51 | 6
12 | (England) Mark McGeeney 94.12 | 7
4 | (England) Jamie Hughes 92.55 | 7
13 | (Belgium) Geert De Vos 97.18 | 6
2 | (England) Martin Adams 86.81 | 5
15 | (Wales) Dean Reynolds 84.90 | 7
7 | (England) Scott Mitchell 95.04 | 6
10 | (Netherlands) Danny Noppert 89.68 | 7
Q | (Australia) Peter Machin 87.54 | 7
Q | (England) Tony O'Shea 84.86 | 6
3 | (England) Scott Waites 84.82 | 7
14 | (England) Brian Dawson 79.02 | 1

Quarter-finals (best of 15 legs); 30 May
16 | (Lithuania) Darius Labanauskas 92.00 | 7
8 | (England) Darryl Fitton 87.17 | 8
12 | (England) Mark McGeeney 83.96 | 1
4 | (England) Jamie Hughes 95.06 | 8
15 | (Wales) Dean Reynolds 92.86 | 8
10 | (Netherlands) Danny Noppert 95.97 | 5
Q | (Australia) Peter Machin 92.20 | 8
3 | (England) Scott Waites 88.76 | 4

Semi-finals (best of 21 legs); 30 May
8 | (England) Darryl Fitton 89.57 | 11
4 | (England) Jamie Hughes 87.95 | 9
15 | (Wales) Dean Reynolds 90.14 | 9
Q | (Australia) Peter Machin 86.48 | 11

Final (best of 25 legs); 30 May
8 | (England) Darryl Fitton 87.84 | 13
Q | (Australia) Peter Machin 81.19 | 9

=== Women ===
==== Draw ====
First Round (best of 7 legs); 28–29 May
1 | (England) Lisa Ashton 73.56 | 4
(England) Casey Gallagher 61.98 | 1
8 | (Australia) Corrine Hammond 69.24 | 4
(Netherlands) Anca Zijlstra 65.85 | 1
4 | (Netherlands) Aileen de Graaf 77.31 | 4
(England) Laura Turner 72.48 | 2
5 | (Russia) Anastasia Dobromyslova 72.48 | 4
(Netherlands) Sharon Prins 69.57 | 3
2 | (England) Deta Hedman 77.07 | 4
(Denmark) Ann-Louise Peters 71.46 | 0
7 | (England) Trina Gulliver 65.79 | 4
(England) Paula Jacklin 66.18 | 3
3 | (England) Fallon Sherrock 81.63 | 3
(Wales) Rhian Griffiths 78.75 | 4
6 | (England) Lorraine Winstanley 72.06 | 4
(England) Zoe Jones 71.70 | 2

Quarter-finals (best of 9 legs); 29 May
1 | (England) Lisa Ashton 98.85 | 5
8 | (Australia) Corrine Hammond 79.08 | 1
4 | (Netherlands) Aileen de Graaf 70.29 | 2
5 | (Russia) Anastasia Dobromyslova 72.30 | 5
2 | (England) Deta Hedman 81.33 | 5
7 | (England) Trina Gulliver 65.40 | 1
(Wales) Rhian Griffiths 72.54 | 5
6 | (England) Lorraine Winstanley 73.38 | 2

Semi-finals (best of 11 legs); 30 May
1 | (England) Lisa Ashton 75.29 | 6
5 | (Russia) Anastasia Dobromyslova 71.15 | 2
2 | (England) Deta Hedman 84.66 | 6
(Wales) Rhian Griffiths 73.30 | 1

Final (best of 13 legs); 30 May
1 | (England) Lisa Ashton 83.54 | 7
2 | (England) Deta Hedman 77.13 | 4

== Television coverage ==
The event is live on UKTV channel Dave. The Winmau website will show live coverage of all three days.
