= 2017 BDO World Trophy =

BDO World Trophy

Tournament information
- Dates: 26–29 May 2017
- Venue: Memo Arts Centre
- Location: Barry
- Country: Wales, United Kingdom
- Organisation(s): BDO
- Format: Legs; Finals: best of 19 (men's) best of 11 (women's)
- Prize fund: £38,000
- Winner's share: £8,000
- High checkout: Men: 170 (Australia) Peter Machin (quarter-finals); Women: 121 (England) Lisa Ashton (Wales) Rhian Griffiths (first round)

Champion(s)
- (Australia) Peter Machin (men) (Netherlands) Aileen de Graaf (women)

The 2017 BDO World Trophy was a major darts tournament run by the British Darts Organisation. It was hosted between 26–29 May 2017 at Memo Arts Centre, Barry, Wales. The event was broadcast on FrontRunner.

Australian qualifier Peter Machin won the men's title, and Dutch player Aileen de Graaf won the women's title.

== Men ==
=== Qualifiers ===
Top 16 in BDO Rankings

1. (England) Glen Durrant
2. (England) Mark McGeeney
3. (England) Jamie Hughes
4. (England) Scott Mitchell
5. (Wales) Dean Reynolds
6. (Netherlands) Danny Noppert
7. (England) Darryl Fitton
8. (Netherlands) Wesley Harms
9. (England) Scott Waites
10. (Lithuania) Darius Labanauskas
11. (Scotland) Ross Montgomery
12. (England) Martin Adams
13. (Belgium) Geert De Vos
14. (Wales) Nick Kenny
15. (Wales) Martin Phillips
16. (Netherlands) Richard Veenstra

17–22 in BDO Rankings

17. (Netherlands) Wouter Vaes
18. (Wales) Jim Williams
19. (England) Brian Dawson
20. (England) Andy Fordham
21. (England) Conan Whitehead
22. (England) James Hurrell

WDF regional Qualifiers

- (Japan) Yuya Higuchi
- (Australia) Peter Machin
- (Sweden) Dennis Nilsson
- (Scotland) Cameron Menzies
- (Turkey) Umit Uygunsozlu
- (United States) Joe Chaney
- (Netherlands) Willem Mandigers

Play-Offs Qualifiers

- (England) Martin Atkins
- (England) Carl Dennell
- (Canada) Jeff Smith

Regional Qualifiers Greg Moss and David Cameron, originally qualified for this event, but had to withdraw before the start of the tournament. They were replaced by the next two-highest non-qualified player in BDO Rankings; James Hurrell and Conan Whitehead.

=== Draw ===
First round (Best of 11 legs); 26-27 May
1	(England) Glen Durrant 98.34	6
(England) Brian Dawson 90.30	5
16	(Netherlands) Richard Veenstra 87.42	3
(England) Andy Fordham 84.94	6
8	(Netherlands) Wesley Harms 100.77	6
Q	(Japan) Yuya Higuchi 84.73	2
9	(England) Scott Waites 87.82	3
Alt	(England) James Hurrell 89.20	6
4	(England) Scott Mitchell 90.82	6
Q	(Turkey) Umit Uygunsozlu 83.26	5
13	(Belgium) Geert De Vos 87.96	3
Q	(Australia) Peter Machin 88.81	6
5	(Wales) Dean Reynolds 87.72	6
(Wales) Jim Williams 86.61	5
12	(England) Martin Adams 93.66	6
Q	(Scotland) Cameron Menzies 92.49	5
2	(England) Mark McGeeney 90.09	6
(Netherlands) Wouter Vaes 91.47	2
15	(Wales) Martin Phillips 85.08	6
PO	(England) Carl Dennell 79.56	0
7	(England) Darryl Fitton 83.82	3
Alt	(England) Conan Whitehead 92.61	6
10	(Lithuania) Darius Labanauskas 95.19	6
Q	(Sweden) Dennis Nilsson 89.90	3
3	(England) Jamie Hughes 95.47	2
PO	(Canada) Jeff Smith 92.31	6
14	(Wales) Nick Kenny 83.19	6
PO	(England) Martin Atkins 84.04	4
6	(Netherlands) Danny Noppert 90.18	4
Q	(Netherlands) Willem Mandigers 89.20	6
11	(Scotland) Ross Montgomery 85.05	6
Q	(United States) Joe Chaney 75.00	3

Second round (Best of 11 legs); 28 May
1	(England) Glen Durrant 99.84	6
(England) Andy Fordham 91.23	2
8	(Netherlands) Wesley Harms 91.02	6
Alt	(England) James Hurrell 87.54	3
4	(England) Scott Mitchell 87.96	3
Q	(Australia) Peter Machin 90.60	6
5	(Wales) Dean Reynolds 84.33	4
12	(England) Martin Adams 87.99	6
2	(England) Mark McGeeney 82.35	1
15	(Wales) Martin Phillips 92.67	6
Alt	(England) Conan Whitehead 93.78	6
10	(Lithuania) Darius Labanauskas 93.99	5
PO	(Canada) Jeff Smith 87.12	0
14	(Wales) Nick Kenny 92.01	6
Q	(Netherlands) Willem Mandigers 87.51	4
11	(Scotland) Ross Montgomery 89.25	6

Quarter-finals (Best of 13 legs); 29 May
1	(England) Glen Durrant 103.59	4
8	(Netherlands) Wesley Harms 101.03	7
Q	(Australia) Peter Machin 100.29	7
12	(England) Martin Adams 96.72	4
15	(Wales) Martin Phillips 88.95	7
Alt	(England) Conan Whitehead 84.09	6
14	(Wales) Nick Kenny 77.04	7
11	(Scotland) Ross Montgomery 78.18	2

Semi-finals (Best of 15 legs); 29 May
8	(Netherlands) Wesley Harms 91.20	6
Q	(Australia) Peter Machin 90.57	8
15	(Wales) Martin Phillips 86.58	8
14	(Wales) Nick Kenny 87.24	5

Final (Best of 19 legs); 29 May
Q	(Australia) Peter Machin 91.08	10
15	(Wales) Martin Phillips 86.25	8

== Women ==
=== Qualifiers ===
Top 8 in Invitational rankings (seeds)
1. (England) Deta Hedman
2. (England) Lisa Ashton
3. (Netherlands) Aileen de Graaf
4. (Russia) Anastasia Dobromyslova
5. (Australia) Corrine Hammond
6. (England) Lorraine Winstanley
7. (England) Trina Gulliver
8. (Netherlands) Sharon Prins

9–14 in BDO Rankings

1. (England) Fallon Sherrock
2. (Wales) Rhian Griffiths
3. (England) Paula Jacklin
4. (Netherlands) Anca Zijlstra
5. (England) Sue Edwards
6. (England) Rachel Brooks

WDF qualifiers
1. (England) Maria O'Brien
2. (England) Lindsey Ashton

=== Draw ===
First Round (best of 7 legs); 26–27 May
1	(England) Deta Hedman 79.23	4
(England) Paula Jacklin 63.12	2
8	(Netherlands) Sharon Prins 71.85	2
(England) Rachel Brooks 70.56	4
4	(Russia) Anastasia Dobromyslova 80.88	4
(England) Sue Edwards 69.00	2
5	(Australia) Corrine Hammond 70.74	4
(England) Fallon Sherrock 68.49	0
2	(England) Lisa Ashton 82.57	3
(Netherlands) Anca Zijlstra 82.87	4
7	(England) Trina Gulliver 74.40	4
Q	(England) Maria O'Brien 72.86	2
3	(Netherlands) Aileen de Graaf 78.79	4
Q	(England) Lindsey Ashton 73.23	1
6	(England) Lorraine Winstanley 75.39	0
(Wales) Rhian Griffiths 88.41	4

Quarter-finals (best of 7 legs); 28 May
1	(England) Deta Hedman 69.27	4
(England) Rachel Brooks 74.07	2
4	(Russia) Anastasia Dobromyslova 71.79	4
5	(Australia) Corrine Hammond 68.31	1
(Netherlands) Anca Zijlstra 67.44	4
7	(England) Trina Gulliver 63.81	1
3	(Netherlands) Aileen de Graaf 79.80	4
(Wales) Rhian Griffiths 74.34	1

Semi-finals (best of 9 legs); 29 May
1	(England) Deta Hedman 81.09	4
4	(Russia) Anastasia Dobromyslova 81.51	5
(Netherlands) Anca Zijlstra 73.83	2
3	(Netherlands) Aileen de Graaf 83.52	5

Final (best of 11 legs); 29 May
4	(Russia) Anastasia Dobromyslova 67.11	2
3	(Netherlands) Aileen de Graaf 67.32	6
