= 2015 Malta Open darts =

Malta Open

Tournament information
- Dates: 10-12 November, 2015
- Venue: Topaz Hotel
- Location: Buġibba
- Country: Malta
- Organisation(s): BDO, WDF, MDA
- Winner's share: €1,200

Champion(s)
- (Turkey) Umit Uygunsozlu

2015 Malta Open was a darts tournament part of the annual, Malta Open, which took place in Buġibba, Malta in 2015.

== Results ==
=== Last 32 ===
Player
(England) Lee Blakey
(Germany) John van de Weerd
(Malta) Albert Scerri
(Greece) Kostas Pantelidis
(Malta) John Ciantar
(England) Lee Rose
(Malta) Lillo Sciacia
(Malta) Martin Agius
(England) Neil Linford
(Malta) Alan Beasley
(Germany) Bak Ko
(England) Bob Avenall
(Malta) Chris Cohen
(England) Dave Irwin
(Malta) Emmanuel Borg
(Greece) George Portokalis

=== Last 16 ===
Final 16
(Turkey)	Umit Uygunsozlu	2
(Germany)	Andreas Krockel	0
(Netherlands)	Wilco Vermeulen	2
(Malta)	Martin Azzopardi	1
(England)	Andy Keen	2
(England)	Lee Jennings	1
(England)	Matt Howard	2
(England)	Zach Quinn	0
(England)	John Walton	2
(England)	Mark Tiller	0
(England)	Colin Hargrave	2
(Malta)	George Mizzi	0
(England)	Joe Davis	2
(Wales)	Mark Layton	0
(Malta)	Norbert Attard	2
(Switzerland)	Patrick Rey	0

Quarter-finals
(Turkey)	Umit Uygunsozlu	2
(Netherlands)	Wilco Vermeulen	0
(England)	Andy Keen	2
(England)	Matt Howard	0
(England)	John Walton	2
(England)	Colin Hargrave	0
(England)	Joe Davis	2
(Malta)	Norbert Attard	1

Semi-finals
(Turkey)	Umit Uygunsozlu	2
(England)	Andy Keen	0
(England)	John Walton	2
(England)	Joe Davis	0

Final
(Turkey)	Umit Uygunsozlu	2
(England)	John Walton	1
