= 2016 BDO World Darts Championship =

Tournament information
- Dates: 2–10 January 2016
- Venue: Lakeside Country Club
- Location: Frimley Green, Surrey
- Country: England, United Kingdom
- Organisation(s): BDO
- Format: Sets
- Prize fund: £339,000 (total)
- Winner's share: £100,000 (men) £12,000 (women) £5,000 (youth)
- High checkout: 161 (England) Scott Mitchell (Canada) Jeff Smith (men's); 160 (Denmark) Ann-Louise Peters (women's)

Champion(s)
- (England) Scott Waites (men) (England) Trina Gulliver (women) (England) Joshua Richardson (youth)

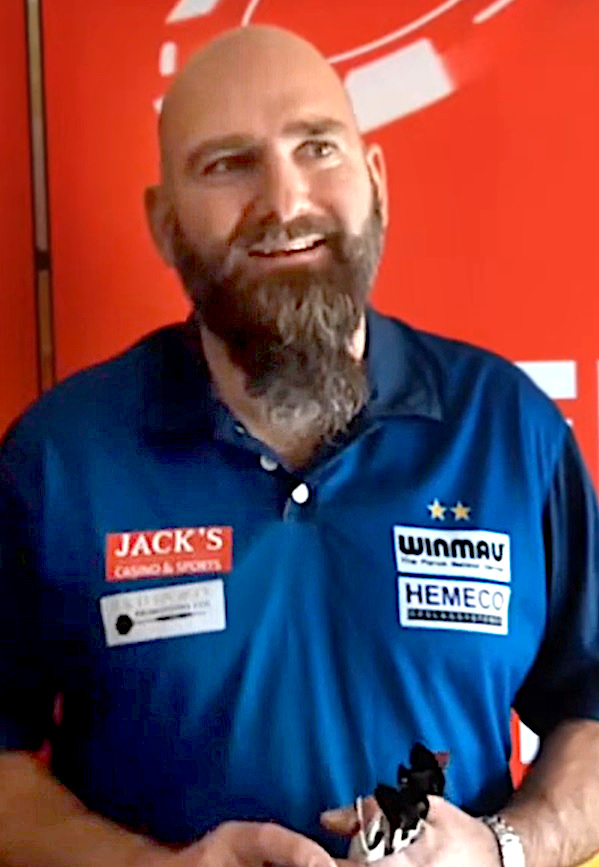
Scott Waites - Winner 2013

The 2016 BDO World Darts Championship (known for sponsorship reasons as the 2016 Lakeside World Professional Darts Championship) was the 39th World Championship organised by the British Darts Organisation, and the 31st staging at the Lakeside Country Club at Frimley Green.

The defending men's champion was Scott Mitchell, who won his first world title in 2015, but lost in the Quarter-finals to Richard Veenstra. 2013 world champion Scott Waites won the title by defeating Jeff Smith 7–1 in the final.

Lisa Ashton was the defending women's champion, having won the previous two editions, but lost to Trina Gulliver in the Quarter-finals. Gulliver then went on to win her 10th world championship title after defeating Deta Hedman 3–2 in the final.

== Format and qualifiers ==
=== Men's ===
On 27 November 2015, Hull qualifier Vladimir Andersen was removed from the field after being suspended by the Danish Darts Union and was replaced by Sam Hewson, the player next in line according to the rankings.

Top 16 (seeded)
1. (England) Glen Durrant (quarter-final)
2. (England) Martin Adams (first round)
3. (Netherlands) Jeffrey de Graaf (first round)
4. (England) Jamie Hughes (semi-final)
5. (Netherlands) Wesley Harms (quarter-final)
6. (England) Scott Mitchell (quarter-final)
7. (England) Darryl Fitton (first round)
8. (Belgium) Geert De Vos (second round)
9. (England) Scott Waites (winner)
10. (Wales) Martin Phillips (second round)
11. (England) Mark McGeeney (second round)
12. (Wales) Jim Williams (second round)
13. (England) Gary Robson (first round)
14. (England) Pip Blackwell (first round)
15. (England) Brian Dawson (second round)
16. (Netherlands) Ryan de Vreede (first round)

17–24 in BDO Rankings (First round qualifiers)

17. (Scotland) Ross Montgomery (first round)
18. (Wales) Dean Reynolds (first round)
19. (England) Dennis Harbour (quarter-final)
20. (Latvia) Madars Razma (second round)
21. (Netherlands) Richard Veenstra (semi-final)
22. (Netherlands) Willem Mandigers (first round)
23. (England) Tony O'Shea (first round)
24. (England) Martin Atkins (second round)

25–27 in BDO rankings (preliminary-round qualifiers)

25. (Lithuania) Darius Labanauskas (preliminary round)
26. (England) James Hurrell (preliminary round)
27. (England) Ted Hankey (first round)

Standby player (preliminary-round qualifier)

28. (England) Sam Hewson (preliminary round)

2015 Semi-Finalist not in top 28 (preliminary-round qualifier)

1. (Canada) Jeff Smith (runner-up)

Hull Qualifiers (preliminary-round qualifiers)

1. (England) John Walton (first round)
2. (Denmark) ~~Vladimir Andersen~~
3. (Scotland) Alan Soutar (preliminary round)
4. (England) Darren Peetoom (preliminary round)

WDF Regional Qualifiers (preliminary-round qualifiers)

1. (Japan) Seigo Asada (first round)
2. (Australia) Rob Modra (preliminary round)
3. (Sweden) Peter Sajwani (first round)
4. (Canada) David Cameron (preliminary round)
5. (Greece) Kostas Pantelidis (first round)
6. (New Zealand) Craig Caldwell (first round)
7. (United States) Larry Butler (second round)
8. (Netherlands) Matthew Medhurst (preliminary round)

==== Preliminary round ====
All matches are the best of 5 sets.

Av.	Player	Score	Player	Av.
92.64	Seigo Asada (Japan) (Q)	3–1	(Lithuania) Darius Labanauskas	83.70
80.79	Rob Modra (Australia) (Q)	0–3	(England) John Walton (Q)	90.06
80.58	Peter Sajwani (Sweden) (Q)	3–2	(England) Sam Hewson (Alt)	74.01
85.17	David Cameron (Canada) (Q)	0–3	(England) Ted Hankey	84.99
81.90	Kostas Pantelidis (Greece) (Q)	3–2	(England) Darren Peetoom (Q)	79.71
91.20	Craig Caldwell (New Zealand) (Q)	3–1	(Scotland) Alan Soutar (Q)	89.01
83.55	Larry Butler (United States) (Q)	3–2	(England) James Hurrell	78.45
81.81	Matthew Medhurst (Netherlands) (Q)	0–3	(Canada) Jeff Smith (WC)	91.59

==== Last 32 ====
First round (best of 5 sets); 2–5 January
1	(England) Glen Durrant 89.66	3
(Wales) Dean Reynolds 81.63	0
16	(Netherlands) Ryan de Vreede 84.84	2
Q	(United States) Larry Butler 86.67	3
8	(Belgium) Geert De Vos 88.44	3
Q	(Greece) Kostas Pantelidis 76.62	1
9	(England) Scott Waites 96.06	3
(Netherlands) Willem Mandigers 87.24	0
5	(Netherlands) Wesley Harms 88.59	3
Q	(Japan) Seigo Asada 88.29	2
12	(Wales) Jim Williams 83.31	3
(England) Tony O'Shea 82.11	0
4	(England) Jamie Hughes 83.76	3
(Scotland) Ross Montgomery 78.90	0
13	(England) Gary Robson 76.74	1
(Latvia) Madars Razma 79.62	3
2	(England) Martin Adams 92.13	0
WC	(Canada) Jeff Smith 92.58	3
15	(England) Brian Dawson 90.78	3
Q	(England) John Walton 90.69	2
7	(England) Darryl Fitton 90.00	2
(England) Dennis Harbour 85.44	3
10	(Wales) Martin Phillips 76.08	3
(England) Ted Hankey 71.31	0
6	(England) Scott Mitchell 92.97	3
Q	(New Zealand) Craig Caldwell 92.76	2
11	(England) Mark McGeeney 84.33	3
Q	(Sweden) Peter Sajwani 74.34	0
3	(Netherlands) Jeffrey de Graaf 87.72	2
(Netherlands) Richard Veenstra 89.64	3
14	(England) Pip Blackwell 80.46	0
(England) Martin Atkins 86.88	3

Second round (best of 7 sets); 6–7 January
1	(England) Glen Durrant 95.49	4
Q	(United States) Larry Butler 83.97	0
8	(Belgium) Geert De Vos 81.75	3
9	(England) Scott Waites 90.75	4
5	(Netherlands) Wesley Harms 85.80	4
12	(Wales) Jim Williams 85.02	3
4	(England) Jamie Hughes 82.92	4
(Latvia) Madars Razma 79.83	1
WC	(Canada) Jeff Smith 91.83	4
15	(England) Brian Dawson 83.22	1
(England) Dennis Harbour 87.51	4
10	(Wales) Martin Phillips 83.88	1
6	(England) Scott Mitchell 90.63	4
11	(England) Mark McGeeney 90.90	3
(Netherlands) Richard Veenstra 91.20	4
(England) Martin Atkins 85.59	0

Quarter-finals (best of 9 sets); 8 January
1	(England) Glen Durrant 95.04	4
9	(England) Scott Waites 95.37	5
5	(Netherlands) Wesley Harms 91.29	1
4	(England) Jamie Hughes 94.11	5
WC	(Canada) Jeff Smith 89.76	5
(England) Dennis Harbour 94.77	2
6	(England) Scott Mitchell 90.21	3
(Netherlands) Richard Veenstra 87.66	5

Semi-finals (best of 11 sets); 9 January
9	(England) Scott Waites 92.10	6
4	(England) Jamie Hughes 82.35	1
WC	(Canada) Jeff Smith 91.50	6
(Netherlands) Richard Veenstra 89.37	5

Final (best of 13 sets); 10 January
9	(England) Scott Waites 87.54	7
WC	(Canada) Jeff Smith 84.99	1

== Women's ==
The televised stages feature 16 players. The top 8 players in the BDO rankings over the 2014/15 season are seeded for the tournament.

Top 8

1. (England) Lisa Ashton (quarter-final)
2. (England) Fallon Sherrock (first round)
3. (England) Deta Hedman (runner-up)
4. (Netherlands) Aileen de Graaf (semi-final)
5. (Russia) Anastasia Dobromyslova (first round)
6. (England) Lorraine Winstanley (quarter-final)
7. (England) Zoe Jones (quarter-final)
8. (England) Trina Gulliver (winner)

Other qualifiers

9. (England) Rachel Brooks (first round)
10. (Australia) Corrine Hammond (first round)
11. (England) Paula Jacklin (first round)
12. (England) Casey Gallagher (first round)
13. (Denmark) Ann-Louise Peters (semi-final)
14. (Netherlands) Anca Zijlstra (quarter-final)

Hull qualifiers

15. (New Zealand) Tina Osborne (first round)
16. (England) Dee Bateman (first round)

=== Bracket ===
Trina Gulliver won her tenth world title, while Deta Hedman lost her third final.

First round (best of 3 sets); 2–6 January
1	(England) Lisa Ashton 83.67	3	3
(England) Paula Jacklin 66.99	1	0
8	(England) Trina Gulliver 69.42	3	0	3
Q	(England) Dee Bateman 61.47	0	3	2
4	(Netherlands) Aileen de Graaf 81.63	3	3
(England) Casey Gallagher 69.93	1	2
5	(Russia) Anastasia Dobromyslova 72.81	2	3	2
(Netherlands) Anca Zijlstra 69.72	3	1	3
2	(England) Fallon Sherrock 77.91	2	3	2
(Denmark) Ann-Louise Peters 70.08	3	0	3
7	(England) Zoe Jones 70.77	3	0	3
Q	(New Zealand) Tina Osborne 69.45	2	3	0
3	(England) Deta Hedman 74.13	3	3
(Australia) Corrine Hammond 69.75	2	1
6	(England) Lorraine Winstanley 84.18	3	3
(England) Rachel Brooks 69.66	2	0

Quarter-finals (best of 3 sets); 7 January
1	(England) Lisa Ashton 68.19	0	3	1
8	(England) Trina Gulliver 68.70	3	1	3
4	(Netherlands) Aileen de Graaf 75.39	3	2	3
(Netherlands) Anca Zijlstra 67.08	0	3	1
(Denmark) Ann-Louise Peters 74.70	3	2	3
7	(England) Zoe Jones 71.28	2	3	0
3	(England) Deta Hedman 80.28	3	3
6	(England) Lorraine Winstanley 77.79	0	1

Semi-finals (best of 3 sets); 8 January
8	(England) Trina Gulliver 80.01	3	1	3
4	(Netherlands) Aileen de Graaf 74.94	1	3	0
(Denmark) Ann-Louise Peters 69.92	0	0
3	(England) Deta Hedman 77.74	3	3

Final (best of 5 sets); 9 January
8	(England) Trina Gulliver 72.93	1	3	2	3	3
3	(England) Deta Hedman 75.51	3	0	3	1	0

== Youth ==
For the second time a youth championship is held. Over 64 players played down to the final in October 2015. The final was played on 7 January between Republic of Ireland player Jordan Boyce and England's Joshua Richardson in a best of five sets match. Richardson won the title with the score being 3–2 in sets.

== TV coverage ==
As with the 2015 BDO World Darts Championship the rights for the 2016 Championships were shared between BBC Sport and BT Sport, BBC coverage was presented by Colin Murray with Bobby George with Rob Walker as the roving reporter. BT Sport coverage was presented by Ray Stubbs alongside current BDO players Tony O'Shea, Scott Mitchell and Ted Hankey with Reshmin Chowdhury replacing Helen Skelton as roving reporter. Commentary for both broadcasters was provided by John Rawling, Vassos Alexander, George Riley and Tony Green. Although it was not known at the time it was the final BDO event to be covered by the BBC before the corporation signed a new TV deal with the Professional Darts Corporation to televise their new Champions League of Darts event.
