= Richie Edwards (darts player) =

Welsh darts player

Personal information
- Full name: Richie Edwards
- Nickname: Tricky
- Born: 27 January 1989 (age 37) Pontypridd, Wales
- Home town: Pontypridd, Wales

Sport
- Sport: Darts
- Playing since: 2009
- Darts: 24 Gram
- Laterality: Right-handed
- Walk-on music: "It's Tricky" by Run DMC

Organisation (see split in darts)
- BDO: 2013–2020
- PDC: 2020 Q School

WDF major events – best performances
- World Championship: Last 32: 2018
- World Masters: Last 80: 2015, 2017
- World Trophy: Last 16: 2018

Richie Edwards (born 27 January 1989) is a former professional Welsh darts player, currently playing in British Darts Organisation events. He qualified for the 2018 BDO World Darts Championship.

== Career ==
James Hurrell withdrew from the 2018 BDO World Darts Championship. Edwards was next highest ranked player who did not qualify, he played Danny Noppert in the first round and lost 3-0 with an average of only 71.

== World Championship results ==
=== BDO ===
- 2018: 1st Round (lost to Danny Noppert 0-3) (sets)
