= Dean Reynolds (darts player) =

Welsh darts player

Personal information
- Full name: Matthew Francis Dean Reynolds
- Nickname: "Dynamite"
- Born: 21 July 1992 (age 34) Cardiff, Wales

Sport
- Sport: Darts
- Playing since: 2010
- Darts: 22g Red Dragon Signature
- Laterality: Right-handed
- Walk-on music: "Dynamite" by Taio Cruz

Organisation (see split in darts)
- BDO: 2015–2019
- PDC: 2011–2015, 2019–2020
- WDF: 2024

WDF major events – best performances
- World Championship: Last 16: 2018, 2019
- World Masters: Last 16: 2016
- World Trophy: Semi-final: 2016
- Finder Masters: Quarter-final: 2016

PDC premier events – best performances
- UK Open: Last 96: 2017

Other tournament wins
- Years
England Classic	2016
French Open	2015
PDC Challenge Tour	2015
PDC Development Tour	2014 (x2), 2015, 2016 (x6)

Matthew Francis Dean Reynolds (born 21 July 1992) is a Welsh former professional darts player who competed in British Darts Organisation (BDO), World Darts Federation (WDF) and Professional Darts Corporation (PDC) events.

== Career ==
Reynolds' first Development Tour title came in 2014 by defeating Max Hopp 4–2. He also won the 16th event by edging past Josh Payne 4–3. Reynolds beat Ryan de Vreede 5–4 to claim the 2015 French Open title. He also took another Development Tour event with a 4–2 victory over Mike de Decker.

In 2016, Reynolds enjoyed a breakthrough year. He qualified for the 2016 BDO World Championship and lost 3–0 to Glen Durrant. At the BDO World Trophy, he defeated Dave Cameron, Martin Adams and Danny Noppert before losing 11–9 to Peter Machin in the semi-finals. He had six tournament wins on the PDC Development Tour during the year guaranteeing him a PDC Tour Card for 2017 and 2018, but he later decided to remain in the BDO and his tour card was passed down to the next highest player on the Order Of Merit. He hit a nine-dart finish at the BDO England Masters in September before losing in the quarter-finals to Durrant. Two days later though, he triumphed in the England Classic, defeating Scott Baker 6–3 in the final.

In the 2017 World Championship he lost 3–2 to Pip Blackwell after being 2–0 up in sets and he missed three darts to win 3–0. Afterwards, Reynolds announced on social media that he rejected his PDC Tour Card for 2017 to improve his consistency on stage. This meant that Reynolds would concentrate on BDO tournaments in 2017.

== World Championship results ==
=== BDO ===
- 2016: 1st Round (lost to Glen Durrant 0–3)
- 2017: 1st Round (lost to Pip Blackwell 2–3)
- 2018: 2nd Round (lost to Scott Waites 2–4)
- 2019: 2nd Round (lost to Jim Williams 0–4)

== Performance timeline ==
Tournament	2014	2015	2016	2017	2018	2019
BDO World Championship	DNQ		1R	1R	2R	2R
BDO World Trophy	DNQ		SF	2R	1R	
Winmau World Masters	DNQ	L80	L16	L32	L80	
Finder Darts Masters	DNQ		QF	RR	RR	
UK Open	1R	Did not play		2R	DNP	

Performance Table Legend
W	Won the tournament	F	Finalist	SF	Semifinalist	QF	Quarterfinalist	#R; RR; L#	Lost in # round Round-robin; Last # stage	DQ	Disqualified
DNQ	Did not qualify	DNP	Did not participate	WD	Withdrew	NH	Tournament not held	#R; RR; L#	Lost in # round Round-robin; Last # stage	NYF	Not yet founded
