= Michael Unterbuchner =

German darts player

Personal information
- Nickname: "T-Rex"
- Born: 23 May 1988 (age 38) Munich, West Germany
- Home town: Landsberg am Lech, Germany

Sport
- Sport: Darts
- Playing since: 2004
- Darts: 23g One80 Signature
- Laterality: Right-handed
- Walk-on music: "Bangarang" by Skrillex

Organisation (see split in darts)
- BDO: 2015–2020
- PDC: 2020–present (Tour Card: 2021–2022)
- WDF: 2015–2020, 2023–present
- Current world ranking: (PDC) 143 (18 October 2026)

WDF major events – best performances
- World Championship: Semi-final: 2018, 2019
- World Masters: Last 16: 2018
- World Trophy: Runner-up: 2018
- Finder Masters: Last 24: 2017, 2018
- Dutch Open: Last 64: 2023

PDC premier events – best performances
- Grand Slam: Quarter-final: 2018

Other tournament wins
- Years
Swiss Open	2018, 2025
PDC Europe Next Gen	2024

Michael Unterbuchner (born 23 May 1988) is a German professional darts player who competes in World Darts Federation (WDF) and Professional Darts Corporation (PDC) events. He previously played in British Darts Organisation (BDO) tournaments until it was dissolved in 2020, finishing as the runner-up at the 2018 BDO World Trophy.

He reached the quarter-finals at the 2018 Grand Slam of Darts and obtained a PDC Tour Card in 2021, but lost his Tour Card at the end of 2022.

He is a two-time world championship semi-finalist, having reached the last four at the BDO World Championship in 2018 and 2019.

== Career ==
In 2017, Unterbuchner reached the last 48 of the World Masters. He qualified for the 2018 BDO World Darts Championship as one of the Playoff Qualifiers and played David Cameron in the preliminary round, winning 3–2. Unterbuchner became the first German player to reach a semi-final at a World Championship, with wins over Jamie Hughes 3–2 in the first round, Martin Phillips 4–2 in the second round, and Richard Veenstra 5–4 in the quarter-finals. Unterbuchner played Mark McGeeney in the semi-finals where he lost 6–4 in sets.

He reached the final of the 2018 BDO World Trophy but lost to Glen Durrant, 10–7 in legs. During the 2018 season, he was the first German to be ranked number one in the World Darts Federation world rankings.

In 2020, Unterbuchner attended the PDC European Qualifying School, but was unable to get a PDC Tour Card. He qualified for two PDC European Tour events, but lost 6–4 in the first round on both occasions.

Unterbuchner also participated in the German Super League Darts 2020 where he made the semi-finals before losing 9–3 to Dragutin Horvat.

Unterbuchner won a Tour Card for the first time at the PDC Q-School in February 2021. However, he earned only £4,000 in ranking money during his two years on the PDC Pro Tour and lost his Tour Card.

After losing his card he returned to competing in World Darts Federation events, reaching the last 64 at the 2023 Dutch Open.

In 2024, Unterbuchner participated in the 2024 PDC Challenge Tour series and reached his first final at Challenge Tour 11.

In February 2025, he qualified for three PDC European Tour events through the Host Nation Qualifiers. He reached the final of Challenge Tour 9 and 20.

== World Championship results ==
=== BDO ===
- 2018: Semi-finals (lost to Mark McGeeney 4–6) (sets)
- 2019: Semi-finals (lost to Scott Waites 1–6)
- 2020: Second round (lost to Scott Mitchell 0–4)

== Career finals ==
=== BDO major finals: 1 ===
Legend
BDO World Trophy (0–1)

Outcome	No.	Year	Championship	Opponent in the final	Score (Note: (l) = score in legs, (s) = score in sets.)
Runner-up	1.	2018	World Trophy	(England) Glen Durrant	7–10 (l)

== Performance timeline ==
BDO

Tournament	2017	2018	2019	2020
BDO Ranked televised events
BDO World Championship	DNP	SF	SF	2R
BDO World Trophy	DNQ	RU	1R	NH
World Masters	4R	6R	DNQ	NH
Finder Darts Masters	RR	RR	NH	

WDF

Tournament	2023	2024
WDF Major/platinum events
WDF World Masters	DNQ	2R
Dutch Open	7R	DNQ

PDC

Tournament	2018	2026
PDC Televised events
UK Open	DNP	3R
Grand Slam of Darts	QF	

PDC European Tour

Season	1	2	3	4	5	6	7	8	9	10	11	12	13	14	15
2020	BDC; DNQ	GDC; DNQ	EDG; 1R	IDO; 1R											
2024	BDO; DNQ	GDG; 1R	IDO; 2R	Did not qualify											
2025	BDO; DNP	EDT; 1R	IDO; DNQ	GDG; 1R	ADO; DNQ	EDG; 1R	Did not qualify								
2026	DNQ				EDG; 2R	ADO; DNP	IDO; 1R	Did not qualify							

PDC Players Championships

Season	1	2	3	4	5	6	7	8	9	10	11	12	13	14	15	16	17	18	19	20	21	22	23	24	25	26	27	28	29	30	31	32	33	34
2021	BOL; 3R	BOL; 1R	BOL; 1R	BOL; 1R	DNP				NIE; 1R	NIE; 1R	NIE; 1R	NIE; 1R	Did not participate											BAR; 2R	BAR; 1R	BAR; 1R	BAR; 1R	DNP						
2022	Did not participate						NIE; 1R	NIE; DNP	BAR; 1R	BAR; 2R	BAR; 3R	DNP				NIE; 2R	NIE; 1R	Did not participate																
2025 (Note: Not a Tour card holder)	Did not participate																									HIL; 2R	HIL; QF	DNP						

Performance Table Legend
W	Won the tournament	F	Finalist	SF	Semifinalist	QF	Quarterfinalist	#R; RR; Prel.	Lost in # round Round-robin; Preliminary round	DQ	Disqualified
DNQ	Did not qualify	DNP	Did not participate	WD	Withdrew	NH	Tournament not held	#R; RR; Prel.	Lost in # round Round-robin; Preliminary round	NYF	Not yet founded
