= Pengiran Mohamed =

Bruneian darts player

Personal information
- Full name: Pengiran Mohamed
- Nickname: "D'Amazing"
- Born: 8 January 1961 (age 65) Bandar Seri Begawan, Brunei
- Home town: Bandar Seri Begawan, Brunei

Sport
- Sport: Darts
- Playing since: 1985
- Darts: 24 Gram
- Laterality: Right-handed
- Walk-on music: "Theme from Mission: Impossible" by Lalo Schifrin

Organisation (see split in darts)
- BDO: 2010–2018

WDF major events – best performances
- World Championship: Preliminary Round: 2018
- World Masters: Last 136: 2010
- World Trophy: Last 32: 2018

Pengiran Mohamed (born 8 January 1961) is a Bruneian professional darts player who plays in British Darts Organisation (BDO) events. He qualified for the 2018 BDO World Darts Championship.

== Career ==
Mohamed reached the Last 136 of the 2010 World Masters. He attempted to qualify for the 2011 BDO World Darts Championship but lost in the Preliminary round. In 2017, Mohamed qualified for the 2018 BDO World Darts Championship after winning the Asian qualifier at the Federal Hotel in Bukit Bintang, Kuala Lumpur, he was the first player from Brunei to compete at the BDO World Darts Championship. In an interview he said, "I will continue my training in preparation for London because the players there are difficult to play against. I have to be prepared both mentally and physically. My hope is to succeed in BDO for the first time for Asia even though it is difficult but if we are determined and confident we can succeed."

== World Championship results ==
=== BDO ===
- 2018: Preliminary Round (lost to Gary Robson 0-3)
