= 2017 World Masters (darts) =

Winmau World Masters

Tournament information
- Dates: 25–27 September
- Venue: Bridlington Spa Hall
- Location: Bridlington
- Country: England
- Organisation(s): BDO
- Format: Sets for men, Legs for women, boys and girls
- Prize fund: £70,500
- Winner's share: £25,000 (men), £5,000 (women)

Champion(s)
- (Poland) Krzysztof Ratajski (men) (England) Lorraine Winstanley (Women) (Germany) Nico Blum (boys) (England) Beau Greaves (girls)

The 2017 Winmau World Masters was a major tournament on the BDO/WDF calendar for 2017. It took place from 25 to 27 September at the Bridlington Spa Hall, which hosted the stage element of the event for the first time since 2009.

Glen Durrant was the defending men's champion after defeating Mark McGeeney in last year's final by 6 sets to 3 but he failed to defend his title after losing to eventual champion Krzysztof Ratajski in the quarter-finals. Trina Gulliver was the defending women's champion after defeating Deta Hedman in the final last year by 5 legs to 2 but she failed to defend her title after losing to Tricia Wright in the quarter-finals.

In the men's, Ratajski won his first ever major as a player and that the first time a Polish player won a televised major. It was even more remarkable that he had to play through all of the qualifying rounds before meeting and defeating the number 7 seed Richard Veenstra in the last 32 by 3 sets to 1, Alan Soutar in the last 16 by 3 sets to nil, defending champion and number 2 seed Glen Durrant in the quarter-finals by 4 sets to 2, number 6 seed Cameron Menzies in the semi-finals by 5 sets to 1, and defeating number 1 seed Mark McGeeney in the final by 6 sets to 1.

The tournament was the last BDO tournament entered by Ratajski as a month after winning the event he accepted an offer to play in the 2018 PDC World Darts Championship and made the full switch to the PDC in January.

During an emergency EGM called due to the issues surrounding how the BDO was currently being run, it was announced that the tournament had recorded losses to the BDO of £80,000 and with that the future of the tournament is in doubt.

== Men's seeds ==
The seedings were finalised on 31 August. For the second consecutive year, there are 16 seeds (a decrease from 32 between 2012 and 2015) with all seeds exempt until the Last 32 stage and cannot play each other until the Last 16 stage.

1. (England) Mark McGeeney (runner-up)
2. (England) Glen Durrant (quarter-finals)
3. (England) Scott Mitchell (last 32)
4. (England) Jamie Hughes (last 32)
5. (Scotland) Ross Montgomery (last 16)
6. (Scotland) Cameron Menzies (semi-finals)
7. (Netherlands) Richard Veenstra (last 32)
8. (Wales) Martin Phillips (quarter-finals)
9. (Wales) Dean Reynolds (last 32)
10. (Netherlands) Wesley Harms (last 32)
11. (Netherlands) Willem Mandigers (last 32)
12. (England) James Hurrell (quarter-finals)
13. (England) Scott Waites (last 32)
14. (Wales) Jim Williams (quarter-finals)
15. (England) Darryl Fitton (last 32)
16. (Wales) Nick Kenny (last 32)

== Men's draw (last 48 onwards) ==
Players in bold denote match winners.

**Last 48** (best of 5 sets); 25 September
(Germany) Michael Unterbuchner	2
(Romania) **Adrian Frim**	**3**
(Northern Ireland) **Neil Duff**	**3**
(Germany) Ricardo Pietreczko	0
(Northern Ireland) **Gary Tipping**	**3**
(Scotland) James Russell	1
(Netherlands) **Toon Greebe**	**3**
(Northern Ireland) Kyle McKinstry	2
(Germany) **Gabriel Clemens**	**3**
(Republic of Ireland) Keith Rooney	2
(England) Daniel Day	0
(Netherlands) **Chris Landman**	**3**
(Republic of Ireland) **Michael Meaney**	**3**
(England) Paul Williams	0
(England) Ted Hankey	2
(Netherlands) **Martijn Kleermaker**	**3**
(Canada) Rod Snow	?
(United States) **Tom Sawyer**	**3**
(Netherlands) **Yoeri Duijster**	**3**
(England) Gary Robson	1
(Netherlands) Dennie Olde Kalter	2
(Poland) **Krzysztof Ratajski**	**3**
(France) Jacques Labre	0
(Scotland) **Alan Soutar**	**3**
(England) Dennis Harbour	1
(England) **Tony O'Shea**	**3**
(Japan) **Shingo Enomata**	**3**
(England) Dave Bird	1
(Wales) **Steve Alker**	**3**
(Republic of Ireland) John O'Shea	?
(Scotland) William Borland	1
(New Zealand) **Mark McGrath**	**3**

**Last 32** (best of 5 sets); 25 September
1	(England) **Mark McGeeney**	**3**
(Romania) Adrian Frim	0
16	(Wales) Nick Kenny	2
(Northern Ireland) **Neil Duff**	**3**
8	(Wales) **Martin Phillips**	**3**
(Northern Ireland) Gary Tipping	0
9	(Wales) Dean Reynolds	1
(Netherlands) **Toon Greebe**	**3**
4	(England) Jamie Hughes	0
(Germany) **Gabriel Clemens**	**3**
13	(England) Scott Waites	0
(Netherlands) **Chris Landman**	**3**
5	(Scotland) **Ross Montgomery**	**3**
(Republic of Ireland) Michael Meaney	0
12	(England) **James Hurrell**	**3**
(Netherlands) Martijn Kleermaker	2
2	(England) **Glen Durrant**	**3**
(United States) Tom Sawyer	0
15	(England) Darryl Fitton	0
(Netherlands) **Yoeri Duijster**	**3**
7	(Netherlands) Richard Veenstra	1
(Poland) **Krzysztof Ratajski**	**3**
10	(Netherlands) Wesley Harms	0
(Scotland) **Alan Soutar**	**3**
3	(England) Scott Mitchell	2
(England) **Tony O'Shea**	**3**
14	(Wales) **Jim Williams**	**3**
(Japan) Shingo Enomata	2
6	(Scotland) **Cameron Menizes**	**3**
(Wales) Steve Alker	1
11	(Netherlands) Willem Mandigers	2
(New Zealand) **Mark McGrath**	**3**

**Last 16** (best of 5 sets); 26 September
1	(England) **McGeeney** 94.53	**3**
(Northern Ireland) Duff 89.64	2
8	(Wales) **Phillips** 83.01	**3**
(Netherlands) Greebe 67.32	0
(Germany) **Clemens** 85.74	**3**
(Netherlands) Landman 67.92	0
5	(Scotland) Montgomery 74.37	0
12	(England) **Hurrell** 81.51	**3**
2	(England) **Durrant** 99.39	**3**
(Netherlands) Duijster 88.23	0
(Poland) **Ratajski** 91.26	**3**
(Scotland) Soutar 84.96	0
(England) O'Shea 81.72	2
14	(Wales) **Williams** 80.91	**3**
6	(Scotland) **Menzies** 97.74	**3**
(New Zealand) McGrath 96.54	1

**Quarter-finals** (best of 7 sets); 27 September
1	(England) **McGeeney** 92.28	**4**
8	(Wales) Phillips 93.09	0
(Germany) **Clemens** 93.11	**4**
12	(England) Hurrell 90.00	3
2	(England) Durrant 93.85	2
(Poland) **Ratajski** 100.68	**4**
14	(Wales) Williams 83.92	0
6	(Scotland) **Menzies** 92.50	**4**

**Semi-finals** (best of 9 sets); 27 September
1	(England) **McGeeney** 86.44	**5**
(Germany) Clemens 84.71	4
(Poland) **Ratajski** 98.40	**5**
6	(Scotland) Menzies 90.39	1

**Final** (best of 11 sets); 27 September
1	(England) McGeeney 90.22	1
(Poland) **Ratajski** 97.46	**6**

== Women's seeds ==
The following women's seeds were:

1. (England) Deta Hedman (quarter-finals)
2. (Netherlands) Aileen de Graaf (last 16)
3. (England) Lorraine Winstanley (winner)
4. (England) Lisa Ashton (last 16)
5. (Australia) Corrine Hammond (runner-up)
6. (Russia) Anastasia Dobromyslova (quarter-finals)
7. (England) Trina Gulliver (quarter-finals)
8. (England) Fallon Sherrock (last 16)

== Women's draw ==
Last 8 onwards.

Last 24; 25 September
(Sweden) Snezana Veljkovic	1
(England) Maria O'Brien	4
(England) Sarah Roberts	4
(England) Christine Readhead	3
(Netherlands) Anca Zijlstra	0
(Japan) Mikuru Suzuki	4
(Sweden) Helene Sundelin	0
(Wales) Rhian Griffiths	4
(United States) Sandy Hudson	2
(England) Tricia Wright	4
(Northern Ireland) Gail Mullan	3
(United States) Lisa Ayers	4
(England) Kate Hulme	2
(Norway) Rachna David	4
(England) Danielle Ashton	4
(Poland) Karolina Podgórska	3

Last 16; 25 September
1	(England) Deta Hedman	4
(England) Maria O'Brien	3
8	(England) Fallon Sherrock	3
(England) Sarah Roberts	4
4	(England) Lisa Ashton	2
(Japan) Mikuru Suzuki	4
5	(Australia) Corrine Hammond	4
(Wales) Rhian Griffiths	3
2	(Netherlands) Aileen De Graaf	3
(England) Tricia Wright	4
7	(England) Trina Gulliver	4
(United States) Lisa Ayers	1
3	(England) Lorraine Winstanley	4
(Norway) Rachna David	0
6	(Russia) Anastasia Dobromyslova	4
(England) Danielle Ashton	2

Quarter-finals; 26 September
1	(England) Deta Hedman 72.69	3
(England) Sarah Roberts 76.41	4
(Japan) Mikuru Suzuki 75.57	3
5	(Australia) Corrine Hammond 65.49	4
(England) Tricia Wright 67.89	4
7	(England) Trina Gulliver 72.00	2
3	(England) Lorraine Winstanley 84.93	4
6	(Russia) Anastasia Dobromyslova 83.94	3

Semi-finals; 27 September
(England) Sarah Roberts 58.27	0
5	(Australia) Corrine Hammond 69.10	4
(England) Tricia Wright 70.06	2
3	(England) Lorraine Winstanley 76.74	4

Final; 27 September
5	(Australia) Corrine Hammond 72.78	2
3	(England) Lorraine Winstanley 76.89	5

== Boy's Draw ==
Players in bold denote match winners.

**Quarter-finals**
(Netherlands) **Ramon Leferink**	**4**
(Republic of Ireland) Killian Heffernan	0
(Germany) **Nico Blum**	**4**
(Netherlands) Justin van Tergouw	3
(England) Keelan Kay	3
(Scotland) **Nathan Girvan**	**4**
(Republic of Ireland) **Keane Barry**	**4**
(England) Owen Maiden	1

**Semi-finals**
(Netherlands) Ramon Leferink	0
(Germany) **Nico Blum**	**4**
(Scotland) Nathan Girvan	1
(Republic of Ireland) **Keane Barry**	**4**

**Final**
(Germany) **Nico Blum** 76.59	**4**
(Republic of Ireland) Keane Barry 79.74	3

== Girl's Draw ==
Players in bold denote match winners.

**Quarter-finals**
(Republic of Ireland) **Katie Sheldon**	**4**
(England) Shannon Reeves	0
(Netherlands) Kyana Frauenfelder	2
(Netherlands) **Quintey Bieman**	**4**
(Netherlands) Lerena Rietbergen	2
(England) **Beau Greaves**	**4**
(Scotland) Sophie McKinlay	1
(Russia) **Ksenia Klochek**	**4**

**Semi-finals**
(Republic of Ireland) **Katie Sheldon**	**4**
(Netherlands) Quintey Bieman	1
(England) **Beau Greaves**	**4**
(Russia) Ksenia Klochek	0

**Final**
(Republic of Ireland) Katie Sheldon 60.78	0
(England) **Beau Greaves** 63.96	**4**
