= Aileen de Graaf =

Dutch darts player (born 1990)

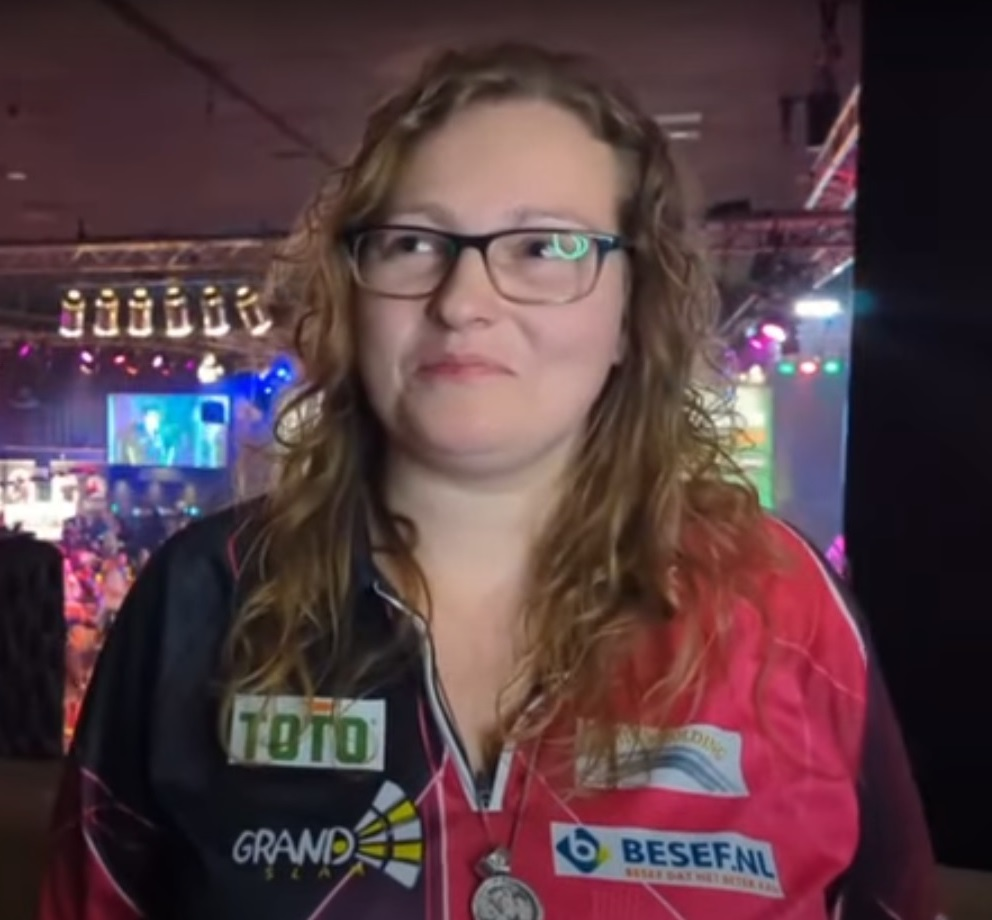
- De Graaf in 2023

Personal information
- Born: 25 April 1990 (age 36) Bunschoten-Spakenburg, Netherlands
- Home town: Bunschoten-Spakenburg, Netherlands

Sport
- Sport: Darts
- Playing since: 2007
- Laterality: Right-handed
- Walk-on music: "Come On Eileen" by Dexys Midnight Runners

Organisation (see split in darts)
- BDO: 2011–2020
- PDC: 2020–
- WDF: 2011–
- Current world ranking: (WDF W) 9 (17 August 2026)

WDF major events – best performances
- World Championship: Runner Up: 2023
- World Masters: Winner (1): 2015
- World Trophy: Winner (1): 2017
- Finder Masters: Winner (2): 2013, 2017
- Dutch Open: Winner (4): 2014, 2015, 2020, 2023

Other tournament wins
- Years
Belfry Open	2022
Belgium Open	2014, 2016, 2017, 2019, 2024
British Classic	2017
British Pentathlon	2018
Bruges Open	2022
Catalonia Open	2021
Czech Open	2014, 2015
Denmark Open	2013, 2015, 2018
FCD Anniversary Open	2016, 2017, 2019, 2021
French Classic	2019
German Gold Cup	2011, 2012, 2013, 2014
German Masters	2016, 2018
German Open	2016, 2018, 2019
Hal Open	2015
Hungarian Classic	2018
Hungarian Masters	2017, 2018
Italian Grand Masters	2016, 2018
Italian Open	2018, 2019
Isle of Man Open	2015
Latvian Open	2018
Lower Austrian Masters	2025
Luxembourg Masters	2019
Luxembourg Open	2011, 2014, 2019
Munsterland Trophy	2015
Police Masters	2014
Polish Open	2014, 2017
Romanian Open	2019, 2025
SunParcs Masters	2012, 2014
Swedish Classic	2016
Swedish Masters	2022
Swiss Open	2014
Turkish Masters	2016, 2017, 2018
Turkish Open	2016, 2017
Welsh Open	2013
World Open	2022
PDC Women's Series	2024 (x1)

Aileen de Graaf (born 25 April 1990) is a Dutch darts player who competes in World Darts Federation (WDF) and Professional Darts Corporation (PDC) events.

== Career ==
De Graaf started to play darts in 2007 and from 2010, played ranking tournaments of the NBD. Since 2012, she plays the BDO/WDF circuit and already won a lot of tournaments or at least reached the later rounds. De Graaf qualified for the BDO World Championship 2014 but lost in the first round against the later champion Lisa Ashton.

== World Championships results ==
=== BDO/WDF ===
- 2014: First round (lost to Lisa Ashton 1–2)
- 2015: Quarter-finals (lost to Fallon Sherrock 1–2)
- 2016: Semi-finals (lost to Trina Gulliver 1–2)
- 2017: Semi-finals (lost to Lisa Ashton 0–2)
- 2018: Quarter-finals (lost to Trina Gulliver 0–2)
- 2019: Quarter-finals (lost to Anastasia Dobromyslova 0–2)
- 2020: Quarter-finals (lost to Beau Greaves 1–2)
- 2022: Quarter-finals (lost to Beau Greaves 0–2)
- 2023: Runner-up (lost to Beau Greaves 1–4)
- 2024: Quarter-finals (lost to Sophie McKinlay 0–2)
- 2025: Second round (lost to Eve Watson 0–2)

== Career finals ==
=== BDO major finals: 6 (2 titles, 4 runners-up) ===
Legend
World Championship (0–1)
World Masters (1–0)
Zuiderduin Masters (1–3)

Outcome	No.	Year	Championship	Opponent in the final	Score (Note: (l) = score in legs, (s) = score in sets.)
Runner-up	1.	2011	Zuiderduin Masters	(England) Deta Hedman	0–2 (s)
Runner-up	2.	2012	Zuiderduin Masters	(Russia) Anastasia Dobromyslova	1–2 (s)
Winner	3.	2013	Zuiderduin Masters	(Russia) Anastasia Dobromyslova	2–0 (s)
Runner-up	4.	2014	Zuiderduin Masters	(Russia) Anastasia Dobromyslova	1–2 (s)
Winner	5.	2015	World Masters	(England) Lisa Ashton	5–4 (l)
Runner-up	6.	2023	World Championship	(England) Beau Greaves	1–4 (s)

=== PDC Women's televised finals: 1 (1 runner-up) ===
Legend
Women's Matchplay (0–1)

Outcome	No.	Year	Championship	Opponent in the final	Score
Runner-up	1.	2022	Women's World Matchplay	Fallon Sherrock	3–6 (l)

== Performance timeline ==
Tournament	2011	2012	2013	2014	2015	2016	2017	2018	2019	2020	2021	2022	2023	2024	2025	2026
WDF Ranked televised events
World Championship	DNQ			1R	QF	SF	SF	QF	QF	QF	NH	QF	F	QF	2R	
World Masters	DNP		SF	SF	W	QF	5R	DNP	4R	NH		2R	NH	DNP		
World Trophy	NYF			QF	QF	QF	W	1R	SF	NH						
Finder Masters	F	F	W	F	RR	F	W	RR	NH							
Dutch Open	RR	SF	SF	W	W	QF	QF	F	F	W	NH	QF	W	F	QF	6R
PDC Non-ranked televised events
Women's World Matchplay	NYF											F	QF	WD	DNQ	

Key

Performance Table Legend
W	Won the tournament	F	Finalist	SF	Semifinalist	QF	Quarterfinalist	#R; RR; Prel.	Lost in # round Round-robin; Preliminary round	DQ	Disqualified
DNQ	Did not qualify	DNP	Did not participate	WD	Withdrew	NH	Tournament not held	#R; RR; Prel.	Lost in # round Round-robin; Preliminary round	NYF	Not yet founded
