= Ümit Uygunsözlü =

Turkish darts player

Personal information
- Nickname: "Angry"
- Born: 1986/1987 Ankara, Turkey
- Home town: Adana, Turkey

Sport
- Sport: Darts
- Playing since: 2010
- Darts: 23 Gram
- Laterality: Right-handed
- Walk-on music: "Suspus" by Ceza

Organisation (see split in darts)
- BDO: 2014–2018

WDF major events – best performances
- World Championship: Last 40: 2018
- World Trophy: Last 32: 2017

Other tournament wins
- Tournament: Years
- Malta Open Mediterranean Cup Mediterranean Open Turkish Masters: 2015; 2015; 2015; 2016

Ümit Uygunsözlü (born 1986/1987) is a Turkish professional darts player.

== Career ==
Uygunsözlü qualified for the 2017 BDO World Trophy by leading the Eastern European rankings thanks to winning the Turkish Open in 2016. He faced Scott Mitchell in the first round. Uygunsözlü lost a tight game 6–5. He maintained his form by reaching the last 8 of the Police Masters and Turkish Classic, enabling him to be the first person from Turkey to qualify for either of Darts World Championship.

== World Championship results ==
=== BDO ===
- 2018: Preliminary round (lost to Chris Harris 2–3)
