= Wesley Harms =

Dutch darts player

Personal information
- Nickname: "Sparky"
- Born: 11 June 1984 (age 42) Alkmaar, Netherlands
- Home town: Heerhugowaard, Netherlands

Sport
- Sport: Darts
- Playing since: 2003
- Darts: Red Dragon
- Laterality: Right-handed
- Walk-on music: "It's My Life" by Bon Jovi

Organisation (see split in darts)
- BDO: 2008–2020
- PDC: 2020–2022

WDF major events – best performances
- World Championship: Semi-final: 2012, 2013
- World Masters: Semi-final: 2012
- World Trophy: Semi-final: 2017
- Finder Masters: Semi-final: 2013

PDC premier events – best performances
- UK Open: Last 96: 2020
- Grand Slam: Last 16: 2012, 2018

Other tournament wins
- Tournament: Years
- BDO International Open British Open Denmark Open England Classic England National Ch'ships England Open French Open German Masters Isle of Man Masters Italian Grand Masters Scottish Open Slovak Open Sunparks Masters Swiss Open Westfries Open WDF Europe Cup Pairs WDF Europe Cup Team WDF World Cup Pairs WDF World Cup Singles: 2011; 2019; 2019; 2018, 2019; 2019; 2012, 2014, 2015; 2012; 2015, 2016; 2019; 2016, 2017, 2018; 2013, 2019; 2019; 2014; 2012; 2018; 2016; 2012; 2015; 2013

Other achievements
- Dirksland Open 2014

Wesley Harms (born 11 June 1984) is a former Dutch professional darts player.

== Career ==
Harms won the BDO International Open in 2011, defeating Stephen Bunting in the final.

Harms qualified for the 2012 BDO World Darts Championship as the 13th seed. He defeated Martin Phillips, Robbie Green, and fellow débutant Paul Jennings to reach the semi-final where he was defeated 6–5 by Tony O'Shea. Harms's performance, followed by subsequent strong runs in the coming months, saw him briefly top the WDF world rankings. Among Harms's other achievements were reaching the semi-finals of the Winmau World Masters in 2012, repeating his world championship semi-final run in 2013 where he was once again beaten by O'Shea, winning the WDF World Cup in 2013 beating world number one Stephen Bunting 7–6 in the final, and reaching the semi-finals of the Zuiderduin Masters in 2013 where he was beaten 3–2 by Bunting. However, he was defeated in the second round of the 2014 World Championship by Tony Eccles after throwing for the match in the sixth set and missing one dart at double 16 to win, also leaving double 18 for the match in the next leg only to see Eccles hit 122 for the set.

=== 2020 ===
Harms won a PDC Tour Card on day 4 of the European Q School.

=== 2022 ===
Harms did not compete in Q-School following the expiration of his PDC Tour Card, hence he did not retain it.

=== 2023 ===
As of May he has started to play darts again and plays in the MODUS Super Series.

== Personal life ==
Wesley Harms played under the nickname "Sparky" because he is an electrician in the Netherlands.

== World Championship results ==
=== BDO ===
- 2012: Semi-finals (lost to Tony O'Shea 5–6)
- 2013: Semi-finals (lost to Tony O'Shea 4–6)
- 2014: 2nd round (lost to Tony Eccles 3–4)
- 2015: 1st round (lost to Jeff Smith 1–3)
- 2016: Quarter-finals (lost to Jamie Hughes 1–5)
- 2017: 1st round (lost to Krzysztof Ratajski 0–3)
- 2018: 1st round (lost to Wayne Warren 1–3)
- 2019: 2nd round (lost to Willem Mandigers 2–4)
- 2020: 2nd round (lost to Scott Waites 2–4)

== Career finals ==
=== WDF major finals: 1 (1 title) ===
Outcome	No.	Year	Championship	Opponent in the final	Score
Winner	1.	2013	World Cup Singles	(England) Stephen Bunting	7–6 (s)

== Performance timeline ==
Tournament	2010	2011	2012	2013	2014	2015	2016	2017	2018	2019	2020
BDO World Championship	DNP		SF	SF	2R	1R	QF	1R	1R	2R	2R
BDO World Trophy	Not held				1R	QF	1R	SF	2R	QF	PDC
Winmau World Masters	1R	3R	SF	6R	5R	5R	QF	5R	5R	3R	PDC
Finder Darts Masters	RR	RR	RR	SF	RR	RR	QF	QF	RR	NH	
UK Open	Did not qualify										3R
Grand Slam of Darts	DNP		2R	RR	RR	Did not qualify			2R	RR	DNQ

Performance Table Legend
DNP	Did not play at the event	DNQ	Did not qualify for the event	NYF	Not yet founded	#R	lost in the early rounds of the tournament (WR = Wildcard round, RR = Round robin)
QF	lost in the quarter-finals	SF	lost in the semi-finals	F	lost in the final	W	won the tournament
