= Mark McGeeney =

English darts player

Personal information
- Nickname: "Gladiator"
- Born: 28 June 1972 (age 54) Coventry, England
- Home town: Stockport, Cheshire, England

Sport
- Sport: Darts
- Playing since: 1991
- Darts: 24g Unicorn Signature
- Laterality: Right-handed
- Walk-on music: "Metalingus" by Alter Bridge

Organisation (see split in darts)
- BDO: 2010–2019
- PDC: 2019–2023 (Tour Card: 2019–2021)

WDF major events – best performances
- World Championship: Runner-up: 2018
- World Masters: Runner-up: 2016, 2017
- World Trophy: Semi-final: 2015
- Finder Masters: Semi-final: 2018
- Dutch Open: Winner (2): 2017, 2018

PDC premier events – best performances
- World Championship: Last 64: 2020
- UK Open: Last 64: 2021
- Grand Slam: Group Stage: 2017, 2018
- PC Finals: Last 64: 2019

Other tournament wins
- Years
British Open	2015
England Classic	2014
German Open	2017
Hal Open	2017
Helvetia Open	2017
Isle of Man Classic	2018
Turkish Masters	2018
Turkish Open	2018
WDF World Cup Team	2015
WSDT Masters Qualifiers 2	2023

Other achievements
- Lincolnshire Open 2015; Weoley Castle Open 2010

Mark McGeeney (born 28 June 1972) is an English professional darts player who competes in Professional Darts Corporation (PDC) events. He previously played in British Darts Organisation (BDO) tournaments, where he won the Dutch Open on two occasions and was the runner-up at the 2018 BDO World Championship and the World Masters in both 2016 and 2017.

== Career ==
=== BDO ===
In August 2010, McGeeney won the Weoley Castle Open, beating Kevin Taylor in the final. In September 2014, he won the England Classic; he beat Sam Hewson in the quarter-final before beating Wesley Harms in the final. In April 2015, McGeeney won the Lincolnshire Open by beating Joshua Richardson in the Final. In September 2015, he won the British Open beating Scott Waites in the final.

McGeeney reached back-to-back Winmau World Masters finals, losing to Glen Durrant and Krzysztof Ratajski in 2016 and 2017 respectively, and won the Dutch Open.

In 2018, after two previous 2nd round losses, McGeeney reached the final of the BDO World Darts Championship against Durrant. McGeeney came from 6–4 down in sets to lead 2–0 in the decider, but eventually lost 7–6. He became only the second player in World Championship history after Mike Gregory in 1992 to miss championship darts (one at D18 and one at D9) and lose the match. The following month, McGeeney retained his Dutch Open title, beating Durrant 3–1 in sets in the final.

In 2019, at his last appearance at a BDO World Championship McGeeney was once again knocked out in the 2nd round.

=== PDC ===
McGeeney revealed in December 2018 that he would compete in the PDC's Q-School in 2019, due to the introduction of rules that allowed unsuccessful Q-School competitors to compete within the BDO. After losing out in the day one final to Harry Ward 5–2, he recovered to go all the way on day two, beating Carl Wilkinson 5–4 in the final to seal a two-year Tour Card.

McGeeney lost his PDC tour card at the end of 2021 having not managed to find his form since moving across from BDO, failing to reach the top 64 to secure an extension. He has been unable to regain a tour card at Q-School.

== World Championship results ==
=== BDO ===
- 2016: 2nd round (lost to Scott Mitchell 3–4)
- 2017: 2nd round (lost to Scott Waites 2–4)
- 2018: Runner-up (lost to Glen Durrant 6–7)
- 2019: 2nd round (lost to Conan Whitehead 0–4)

=== PDC ===
- 2020: 2nd round (lost to Ricky Evans 1–3)

== Career finals ==
=== BDO major finals: 3 (3 runner-up) ===
Legend
World Championship (0–1)
Winmau World Masters (0–2)

Outcome	No.	Year	Championship	Opponent in the final	Score (Note: (l) = score in legs, (s) = score in sets.)
Runner-up	1.	2016	Winmau World Masters	(England) Glen Durrant	3–6 (s)
Runner-up	2.	2017	Winmau World Masters	(Poland) Krzysztof Ratajski	1–6 (s)
Runner-up	3.	2018	World Darts Championship	(England) Glen Durrant	6–7 (s)

== Performance timeline ==
=== BDO ===
Tournament	2010	2011	2012	2013	2014	2015	2016	2017	2018	2019
BDO Ranked televised events
World Championship	Did not qualify						2R	2R	F	2R
World Trophy	Not held				DNQ	SF	2R	2R	2R	PDC
World Masters	2R	2R	RR	3R	QF	6R	F	F	6R	PDC
Finder Masters	Did not qualify							RR	SF	PDC

=== PDC ===
Tournament	2013	2017	2018	2019	2020	2021
PDC Ranked televised events
World Championship	BDO				2R	DNQ
UK Open	Prel.	DNQ		2R	3R	4R
Grand Slam	DNP	RR	RR	DNQ		
Career statistics
Year-end ranking	NR	162	156	75	65	139

==== European Tour ====
Tournament	2019
European Grand Prix	3R
European Matchplay	1R

==== Players Championships ====
Season	1	2	3	4	5	6	7	8	9	10	11	12	13	14	15	16	17	18	19	20	21	22	23	24	25	26	27	28	29	30
2019	WIG; 1R	WIG; 2R	WIG; 1R	WIG; 4R	BAR; 2R	BAR; 1R	WIG; SF	WIG; 3R	BAR; 2R	BAR; 3R	BAR; 1R	BAR; 1R	BAR; 4R	BAR; 1R	BAR; 2R	BAR; 1R	WIG; 4R	WIG; 3R	BAR; 1R	BAR; 1R	HIL; 4R	HIL; 1R	BAR; 2R	BAR; 1R	BAR; 1R	BAR; 2R	DUB; 4R	DUB; 1R	BAR; 1R	BAR; 4R
2020	BAR; 1R	BAR; 1R	WIG; 1R	WIG; 1R	WIG; 2R	WIG; 1R	BAR; 1R	BAR; 2R	MIL; 1R	MIL; 2R	MIL; 2R	MIL; 2R	MIL; 1R	NIE; 1R	NIE; 1R	NIE; 1R	NIE; 2R	NIE; 1R	COV; 2R	COV; 1R	COV; 1R	COV; 1R	COV; 1R							
2021	BOL; 2R	BOL; 1R	BOL; 1R	BOL; 1R	MIL; 1R	MIL; 1R	MIL; 1R	MIL; 1R	NIE; DNP	NIE; DNP	NIE; DNP	NIE; DNP	MIL; 1R	MIL; 1R	MIL; DNP	MIL; DNP	COV; 1R	COV; 1R	COV; 1R	COV; 1R	BAR; 1R	BAR; 1R	BAR; 1R	BAR; 1R	BAR; 1R	BAR; 1R	BAR; 1R	BAR; 1R	BAR; 1R	BAR; 2R

Performance Table Legend
W	Won the tournament	F	Finalist	SF	Semifinalist	QF	Quarterfinalist	#R; RR; Prel.	Lost in # round Round-robin; Preliminary round	DQ	Disqualified
DNQ	Did not qualify	DNP	Did not participate	WD	Withdrew	NH	Tournament not held	#R; RR; Prel.	Lost in # round Round-robin; Preliminary round	NYF	Not yet founded
