= Barry Memorial Hall =

Multi-arts venue in Barry, Wales

Coordinates: 51°24′15″N 3°16′30″W

Barry Memorial Hall

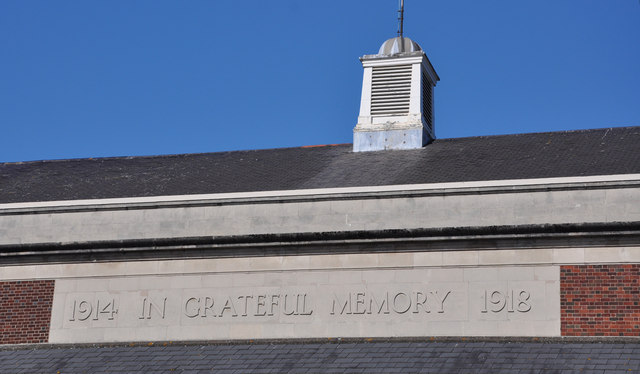
Inscription on the hall which reads "1914 In Grateful Memory 1918"

The Memo Arts Centre, formerly known as Barry Memorial Hall or Memorial Hall & Theatre, popularly known as The Memo, is a prominent venue in Barry, Vale of Glamorgan, currently the "largest multi-arts venue in the Vale of Glamorgan, and only cinema exhibitor in Barry". It is situated in the Gladstone neighbourhood on Gladstone Road, off Holton Road. It was inaugurated in November 1932, and obtained its name in remembrance of those locals who died in World War I.

It regularly hosts arts events and concerts, including live music, dance, and pantomime, workshops, and community events. It also hosts a nightclub for teenagers on Friday evenings which is very popular with the youth of the town. The main auditorium of the hall has a capacity of 886 people, 1,300 including standing. Over the years, artists as diverse as PJ & Duncan and Len Rawle have performed at the hall.
