= Zoe Jones (darts player) =

English darts player (born 1992)

Personal information
- Nickname: The Pink Panther
- Born: 2 September 1992 (age 34) England
- Home town: Redditch, England

Sport
- Sport: Darts
- Laterality: Right-handed
- Walk-on music: The Pink Panther Theme by Henry Mancini

Organisation (see split in darts)
- BDO: 2009-2018

WDF major events – best performances
- World Championship: Quarter Final: 2015, 2016
- World Masters: Quarter Final: 2011, 2014
- World Trophy: Quarter Final: 2015

Other tournament wins
- Tournament: Years
- Girls WDF Europe Youth Cup Girls World Masters Antwerp Open BDO Gold Cup England Matchplay Turkish Open: 2009; 2009, 2010; 2013; 2012; 2014; 2014

Zoe Jones (born 2 September 1992) is an English former professional darts player.

== Career ==
Her first professional tournament victory was when she was sixteen, in the 2009 Girls WDF Europe Youth Cup, when she beat Aliisa Koskivirta of Finland in the final. She has also won consecutive Girls World Masters in 2009 and 2010, beating Emily Davidson and Sara Rosen respectively.

In 2011, she competed in three BDO women's events, namely the Scottish, Welsh and English Opens, losing in the last 16 of all three. She is currently sponsored by Red Dragon Darts, who describe her thus: "We have no doubt that in Zoe we have found a rising star and someone with a bright future in the game."

She also competes at county level for Worcestershire.

== World Championship results ==
=== BDO ===
- 2015: Quarter Final (lost to Anastasia Dobromyslova 0–2)
- 2016: Quarter Final (lost to Ann-Louise Peters 1–2)
