= BDO World Trophy =

Tournament information
- Venue: King George's Hall
- Location: Blackburn
- Country: England
- Established: 2014
- Organisation(s): BDO category Major / WDF category Special
- Format: Legs
- Prize fund: £78,000 (men), £22,000 (women)
- Final Year: 2019

Current champion(s)
- (Wales) Jim Williams (men) (England) Lisa Ashton (women)

The BDO World Trophy was a major darts tournament run by the British Darts Organisation, hosted originally in February 2014 at Blackpool Tower, before it was held in May from 2016–18 in various locations. In 2019, it was held in King George's Hall in Blackburn with a three-year contract for the event to be televised by Eurosport. The tournament was organized by BDO Events, the commercial arm of the British Darts Organisation.

== History ==
The first World Trophy was held in February 2014 at the Tower Ballroom, Blackpool. The Event marked the first BDO major event since the split in darts to not feature the BDO World Champion as Stephen Bunting joined the Professional Darts Corporation once he won the Lakeside Championship in 2014.

== Final Results and statistics ==
Year	Champion	Av.	Score	Runner-Up	Av.	Prize Money			Venue	Sponsor
Year	Champion	Av.	Score	Runner-Up	Av.	Total	Champion	Runner-up	Venue	Sponsor
2014	(England) James Wilson	90.95	13 – 11	(Scotland) Ross Montgomery	90.20	£80,000	£30,000	£12,000	Blackpool Tower, Blackpool	Daily Mirror
2015	(Belgium) Geert De Vos	86.30	10 – 9	(Netherlands) Jeffrey de Graaf	88.20	£40,000	£10,000	£5,000	Event City, Manchester	Winmau
2016	(England) Darryl Fitton	87.84	13 – 9	(Australia) Peter Machin	81.19	£78,000	£20,000	£10,000	Lakeside Country Club, Frimley Green	SportsDirect.com
2017	(Australia) Peter Machin	91.07	10 – 8	(Wales) Martin Phillips	86.24	£38,000	£8,000	£4,000	Memo Arts Centre, Barry	
2018	(England) Glen Durrant	97.00	10 – 7	(Germany) Michael Unterbuchner	95.67	£34,000	£8,000	£4,000	Preston Guild Hall, Preston	Winmau
2019	(Wales) Jim Williams	85.36	8 – 6	(Netherlands) Richard Veenstra	84.67	£34,750	£8,000	£4,000	King George's Hall, Blackburn	One80, L-style

=== Finalists ===
Player	Won	Runner-up
(Australia) Peter Machin	1	1
(England) Glen Durrant	1	0
(England) Darryl Fitton	1	0
(Belgium) Geert De Vos	1	0
(Wales) Jim Williams	1	0
(England) James Wilson	1	0
(Netherlands) Jeffrey de Graaf	0	1
(Scotland) Ross Montgomery	0	1
(Wales) Martin Phillips	0	1
(Germany) Michael Unterbuchner	0	1
(Netherlands) Richard Veenstra	0	1

== Averages ==
Ten highest BDO World Trophy one-match averages
Average	Player	Year (+ Round)	Opponent	Result
104.60	(England) Scott Taylor	2019, Last 32	(Netherlands) Derk Telnekes	5–3
104.55	(England) Glen Durrant	2016, Last 16	(Lithuania) Darius Labanauskas	3-7
103.59	(England) Glen Durrant	2017, QF	(Netherlands) Wesley Harms	4-7
103.44	(England) Glen Durrant	2015, Last 32	(Czech Republic) Karel Sedláček	6-1
102.90	(England) Glen Durrant	2018, Last 16	(England) Tony O'Shea	6-1
102.24	(Scotland) Ross Montgomery	2018, Last 16	(Scotland) Ryan Hogarth	6-2
101.43	(Lithuania) Darius Labanauskas	2016, Last 16	(England) Glen Durrant	7-3
100.77	(Netherlands) Wesley Harms	2017, Last 32	(Japan) Yuya Higuchi	6-2
100.29	(Australia) Peter Machin	2017, QF	(England) Martin Adams	7-4
100.27	(England) Glen Durrant	2018, QF	(Lithuania) Darius Labanauskas	7-5

Five highest losing averages
Average	Player	Year (+ Round)	Opponent	Result
104.55	(England) Glen Durrant	2016, Last 16	(Lithuania) Darius Labanauskas	3-7
103.59	(England) Glen Durrant	2017, QF	(Netherlands) Wesley Harms	4-7
99.83	(Belgium) Mario Vandenbogaerde	2019, Last 16	(Belgium) Roger Janssen	3-5
98.95	(Wales) Wayne Warren	2019, Last 16	(England) Daniel Day	4-5
98.88	(Belgium) Geert de Vos	2016, Last 16	(England) Jamie Hughes	6-7

Different players with a 100+ match average - updated 4/9/2019
Player	Total	Highest Av.	Year (+ Round)
(England) Glen Durrant	5	104.55	2016, Last 16
(England) Scott Taylor	1	104.60	2019, Last 32
(Scotland) Ross Montgomery	1	102.24	2018, Last 16
(Lithuania) Darius Labanauskas	1	101.43	2016, Last 16
(Netherlands) Wesley Harms	1	100.77	2017, Last 32
(Australia) Peter Machin	1	100.29	2017, QF

Five highest tournament averages (min 3 matches)
Average	Player	Year
100.59	(England) Glen Durrant	2017
99.47	(England) Glen Durrant	2018
97.20	(England) Glen Durrant	2015
95.51	(Netherlands) Wesley Harms	2017
93.83	(Lithuania) Darius Labanauskas	2015

== Women's Championship ==
Finals
Year	Champion	Av.	Score	Runner-Up	Av.	Prize Money			Venue	Sponsor
Year	Champion	Av.	Score	Runner-Up	Av.	Total	Champion	Runner-up	Venue	Sponsor
2014	(Russia) Anastasia Dobromyslova	73.41	9 – 7	(England) Lisa Ashton	72.00	£14,400	£6,000	£2,400	Blackpool Tower, Blackpool	Daily Mirror
2015	(England) Lisa Ashton	77.67	7 – 5	(Russia) Anastasia Dobromyslova	73.89	£10,500	£3,000	£1,500	Event City, Manchester	Winmau
2016	(England) Lisa Ashton	83.54	7 – 4	(England) Deta Hedman	77.13	£22,000	£4,000	£2,000	Lakeside Country Club, Frimley Green	SportsDirect.com
2017	(Netherlands) Aileen de Graaf	67.32	6 – 2	(Russia) Anastasia Dobromyslova	67.11	£22,000	£4,000	£2,000	Memo Arts Centre, Barry	
2018	(England) Fallon Sherrock	94.22	6 – 3	(England) Lorraine Winstanley	84.77	£13,500	£3,000	£1,500	Preston Guild Hall, Preston	Winmau
2019	(England) Lisa Ashton	81.04	6 – 2	(Russia) Anastasia Dobromyslova	78.82	£8,500	£2,000	£1,000	King George's Hall, Blackburn	One80, L-style

Finalists
Player	Won	Runner-up
(England) Lisa Ashton	3	1
(Russia) Anastasia Dobromyslova	1	3
(Netherlands) Aileen de Graaf	1	0
(England) Fallon Sherrock	1	0
(England) Deta Hedman	0	1
(England) Lorraine Winstanley	0	1

== Averages ==
Ten highest BDO World Trophy one-match averages
Average	Player	Year (+ Round)	Opponent	Result
98.85	(England) Lisa Ashton	2016, QF	(Australia) Corrine Hammond	5–1
94.22	(England) Fallon Sherrock	2018, F	(England) Lorraine Winstanley	6-3
91.65	(England) Fallon Sherrock	2018, SF	(England) Roz Bulmer	5-0
88.41	(England) Fallon Sherrock	2015, Last 16	(England) Paula Jacklin	4-0
88.41	(Wales) Rhian Griffiths	2017, Last 16	(England) Lorraine Winstanley	4-0
88.17	(Japan) Mikuru Suzuki	2019, Last 16	(England) Fallon Sherrock	4-3
88.13	(Russia) Anastasia Dobromyslova	2019, QF	(England) Maria O'Brien	4-1
87.39	(England) Lisa Ashton	2015, QF	(England) Zoe Jones	5-0
87.08	(England) Lorraine Winstanley	2019, Last 16	(England) Kirsty Hutchinson	4-3
86.94	(England) Lisa Ashton	2019, QF	(England) Casey Gallagher	4-2

Five highest losing averages
Average	Player	Year (+ Round)	Opponent	Result
84.77	(England) Lorraine Winstanley	2018, Final	(England) Fallon Sherrock	3-6
84.42	(England) Kirsty Hutchinson	2019, Last 16	(England) Lorraine Winstanley	3-4
82.86	(Netherlands) Aileen de Graaf	2019, SF	(England) Lisa Ashton	4-5
82.56	(England) Lisa Ashton	2017, Last 16	(Netherlands) Anca Zijlstra	3-4
81.64	(Netherlands) Aileen de Graaf	2018, Last 16	(England) Maria O'Brien	3-4

Five highest tournament averages (min 3 matches)
Average	Player	Year
84.15	(England) Fallon Sherrock	2018
83.63	(Russia) Anastasia Dobromyslova	2019
83.34	(England) Fallon Sherrock	2015
82.82	(England) Lisa Ashton	2016
81.69	(England) Lisa Ashton	2015

== Sponsors ==
The tournament has been sponsored by the Daily Mirror, Winmau and SportsDirect.com. From 2019, the tournament's sponsors have been One80 and L-style

Sponsor	Year
Daily Mirror	2014
Winmau	2015
Winmau	2018
SportsDirect.com	2016
One80	2019
L-style	2019

== Media coverage ==
The BDO World Trophy was broadcast live and in its entirety by Eurosport for the first two events. After an issue with partner De:Luxe sports group the 2016 event ended up being shown on Dave in 2016. FrontRunner broadcast some of the 2017 event. A new TV channel has been found for the 2018 event when it was announced that Premier Sports will show all 5 days action. Eurosport showed the last edition of the World Trophy in 2019.

Broadcaster	Years
Eurosport	2014-2015
Dave	2016
FrontRunner	2017
Premier Sports	2018
Eurosport	2019
