= Corrine Hammond =

Australian darts player (born 1982)

Personal information
- Nickname: "Rinnie"
- Born: 18 February 1982 (age 44) Australia
- Home town: Newcastle, New South Wales, Australia

Sport
- Sport: Darts
- Darts: 25g 95% Tungsten
- Walk-on music: "Sugar" by Robin Schulz

Organisation (see split in darts)
- BDO: 2007, 2015-2020
- WDF: 2015–
- Current world ranking: (WDF W) NR (17 August 2026)

WDF major events – best performances
- World Championship: Runner-up: 2017
- World Masters: Runner-up: 2017
- World Trophy: Quarter-final: 2016, 2017

Other tournament wins
- Years
| Australian Masters | 2023 |

Corrine Hammond is an Australian darts player who competes in World Darts Federation (WDF) events.

== Career ==
Hammond qualified for the 2016 BDO World Darts Championship and lost to Deta Hedman in the first round 2–0. In 2016, she reached the quarter-final of the World Masters and BDO World Trophy. She qualified for the 2017 BDO World Darts Championship where she finished runner-up, losing to Lisa Ashton in the final.

== World Championship results ==
=== BDO/WDF ===
- 2016: First round (lost to Deta Hedman 0–2)
- 2017: Runner-up (lost to Lisa Ashton 0–3)
- 2018: First round (lost to Fallon Sherrock 1–2)
- 2019: First round (lost to Fallon Sherrock 0–2)
- 2020: Semi-finals (lost to Lisa Ashton 0–2)
- 2022: Second round (lost to Rhian O'Sullivan 1–2)
