= 2016 World Masters (darts) =

Winmau World Masters

Tournament information
- Dates: 1–4 December
- Venue: Lakeside Country Club
- Location: Frimley Green, Surrey
- Country: England
- Organisation(s): BDO
- Format: Sets for men, Legs for women, boys and girls
- Prize fund: £70,500
- Winner's share: £25,000 (men), £5,000 (women)

Champion(s)
- (England) Glen Durrant (men) (England) Trina Gulliver (women) (Netherlands) Justin van Tergouw (boys) (Russia) Veronika Koroleva (girls)

The 2016 Winmau World Masters was a major tournament on the BDO/WDF calendar for 2016. It took place from 1–4 December at the Lakeside Country Club.

Glen Durrant maintained the men's title whilst Trina Gulliver won her sixth women's World Masters.

== Men's ==
=== Seeds ===
Seeding was take place in accordance of the BDO rankings for end of October 2016. The players was seeded in fifth round.

1. **Glen Durrant** **(champion)**
2. Scott Mitchell (semi-finals)
3. Scott Waites (sixth round)
4. Martin Adams (fifth round)
5. Jamie Hughes (semi-finals)
6. Danny Noppert (fifth round)
7. (Wales) Dean Reynolds (sixth round)
8. Darius Labanauskas (sixth round)
9. Wesley Harms (quarter-finals)
10. Darryl Fitton (quarter-finals)
11. Richard Veenstra (fifth round)
12. Jim Williams (sixth round)
13. (England) Brian Dawson (sixth round)
14. Mark McGeeney (runner-up)
15. Geert De Vos (sixth round)
16. (Wales) Martin Phillips (fifth round)

=== Draw (last 32 onwards) ===
Players in bold denote match winners.

**Fifth round** (best of 5 sets)
1	(England) **Glen Durrant** 87.78	**3**
(Malta) Norbert Attard 81.60	0
16	(Wales) Martin Phillips79.80	1
(Belgium) **Davy Van Baelen** 86.67	**3**
8	(Lithuania) **Darius Labanauskas** 83.13	**3**
(Wales) Steve Alker 78.09	0
9	(Netherlands) **Wesley Harms** 88.07	**3**
(Australia) Raymond Smith 85.08	2
5	(England) **Jamie Hughes** 90.51	**3**
(England) Gary Robson 85.41	1
12	(Wales) **Jim Williams** 92.79	**3**
(Germany) Robert Allenstein 84.48	2
4	(England) Martin Adams 79.29	2
(Republic of Ireland) **John O'Shea** 79.35	**3**
13	(England) **Brian Dawson** 86.76	**3**
(Canada) Jeff Smith 87.00	2
2	(England) **Scott Mitchell** 90.18	**3**
(Sweden) Oskar Lukasiak 73.89	0
15	(Belgium) **Geert De Vos** 83.49	**3**
(Republic of Ireland) Michael Meaney 71.94	0
7	(Wales) **Dean Reynolds** 82.17	**3**
(Northern Ireland) Neil Duff 73.11	0
10	(England) **Darryl Fitton** 90.18	**3**
(England) Dave Parletti 85.98	0
6	(Netherlands) Danny Noppert 86.91	2
(Canada) **Kiley Edmunds** 89.91	**3**
11	(Netherlands) Richard Veenstra 84.24	1
(Scotland) **Alan Soutar** 89.40	**3**
3	(England) **Scott Waites** 83.76	**3**
(England) David Copley 87.99	0
14	(England) **Mark McGeeney** 88.65	**3**
(England) James Hurrell 94.44	2

**Sixth round** (best of 5 sets)
1	(England) **Glen Durrant** 93.00	**3**
(Belgium) Davy Van Baelen 85.98	1
8	(Lithuania) Darius Labanauskas 89.58	2
9	(Netherlands) **Wesley Harms** 87.27	**3**
5	(England) **Jamie Hughes** 83.27	**3**
12	(Wales) Jim Williams 90.74	2
(Republic of Ireland) **John O'Shea** 86.31	**3**
13	(England) Brian Dawson 86.85	1
2	(England) **Scott Mitchell** 93.69	**3**
15	(Belgium) Geert De Vos 84.95	1
7	(Wales) Dean Reynolds 82.13	0
10	(England) **Darryl Fitton** 89.18	**3**
(Canada) **Kiley Edmunds** 87.75	**3**
(Scotland) Alan Soutar 89.91	2
3	(England) Scott Waites 94.93	2
14	(England) **Mark McGeeney** 95.45	**3**

**Quarter-finals** (best of 7 sets)
1	(England) **Glen Durrant** 88.77	**4**
9	(Netherlands) Wesley Harms 87.42	3
4	(England) **Jamie Hughes** 84.48	4
(Republic of Ireland) John O'Shea 79.50	2
2	(England) **Scott Mitchell** 89.16	**4**
10	(England) Darryl Fitton 86.73	1
(Canada) Kiley Edmunds 89.21	2
14	(England) **Mark McGeeney** 91.76	**4**

**Semi-finals** (best of 9 sets)
1	(England) **Glen Durrant** 99.53	**5**
4	(England) Jamie Hughes 87.59	0
2	(England) Scott Mitchell 90.93	2
14	(England) **Mark McGeeney** 92.40	**5**

**Final** (best of 11 sets)
1	(England) **Glen Durrant** 92.46	**6**
14	(England) Mark McGeeney 86.28	3

== Women's Draw ==
Last 8 onwards.

Quarter-finals; Best of 7 legs Losers £500
1	(England) Deta Hedman 76.65	4
(Australia) Corrine Hammond 69.30	2
2	(Russia) Anastasia Dobromyslova 76.60	2
(England) Maria O'Brien 80.91	4
3	(Netherlands) Aileen de Graaf 64.56	0
(England) Trina Gulliver 63.96	4
4	(England) Lisa Ashton 76.60	3
(Sweden) Vicky Pruim 84.93	4

Semi-finals; Best of 7 legs Losers £750
1	(England) Deta Hedman 68.46	4
(England) Maria O'Brien 68.25	1
(England) Trina Gulliver 64.41	4
(Sweden) Vicky Pruim 62.85	1

Final; Best of 9 legs Winner £5,000; Runner up £2,000
1	(England) Deta Hedman 64.95	2
(England) Trina Gulliver 63.78	5

== Boy's draw ==
Last 8 onwards.

Quarterfinals
1	(Netherlands) Justin van Tergouw	4
(Republic of Ireland) Jordan Boyce	1
2	(Netherlands) Wessel Nijman	4
(Netherlands) Maikel Verberk	1
4	(England) Keelan Kay	3
(England) Owen Maiden	4
3	(England) Daniel Perry	4
(England) Reece Colley	0

Semifinals
1	(Netherlands) Justin van Tergouw	4
2	(Netherlands) Wessel Nijman	1
3	(England) Daniel Perry	2
(England) Owen Maiden	4

Finals
1	(Netherlands) Justin van Tergouw	4
(England) Owen Maiden	1

== Girl's draw ==
Last 4 onwards.

Semifinals
1	(England) Beau Greaves	4
(Denmark) Melissa Reus	0
(Denmark) Line Kristiansen	0
2	(Russia) Veronika Koroleva	4

Finals
1	(England) Beau Greaves 66.14	3
2	(Russia) Veronika Koroleva 61.86	4
