= Isle of Man Open =

Tournament information
- Venue: Villa Marina Complex
- Location: Douglas
- Country: Isle of Man
- Established: 1986
- Organisation(s): EDO
- Format: Legs
- Prize fund: £14,100
- Month(s) Played: March

Current champion(s)
- Jack Drayton (men's); Gemma Hayter (women's)

The Isle of Man Open is a darts tournament that has been held since 1986.

== List of tournaments ==
=== Men's ===
Year	Champion	Score	Runner-up	Total Prize Money	Champion	Runner-up
1986	(England) Alan Warriner	2–0	(England) Tony Littlewood			
1987	(England) Steve Gittins	beat	(England) Kevin Spiolek			
1988	(England) Dennis Priestley	2–1	(England) Reg Harding			
1989	(England) Dennis Priestley	3–2	(Northern Ireland) Hugh Cochrane			
1990	(England) Phil Taylor	3–2	(England) Ronnie Baxter	£2,500	£1,500	£600
1991	(Scotland) Jamie Harvey	3–0	(England) Steve Coote			
1992	(England) Alan Warriner	3–2	(England) Kevin Spiolek			
1993	(England) Kevin Spiolek	beat	(England) Alan Warriner			
1994	(England) Mick Manning	3–0	(Northern Ireland) John MaGowan	£3,850	£2,250	£1,000
1995	(England) Andy Fordham	3–2	(England) Martin Adams			
1996	(England) Ronnie Baxter	beat	(Scotland) Les Wallace			
1997	(England) Ronnie Baxter	beat	(England) Martin Adams			
1998	(England) Peter Manley	beat	(England) Alan Warriner			
1999	(England) Andy Hayfield	beat	(England) Alan Warriner			
2000	(England) Ronnie Baxter	3–0	(England) Shayne Burgess			
2001	(Wales) Alan Reynolds	3–0	(England) Les Fitton			
2002	(Wales) Richie Burnett	3–1	(England) Ronnie Baxter			
2003	(England) Tom Wilson	beat	(England) Peter Manley			
2004	(England) Peter Manley	3–2	(England) Darryl Fitton	£3,000		
2005	(England) Brian Woods	3–2	(England) Tony Eccles			
2006	(Scotland) Gary Anderson	beat	(England) Ted Hankey			
2007	(England) Gary Robson	3–1	(England) Phill Nixon	£9,040	£5,000	£1,500
2008	(England) Dave Chisnall	3–1	(Wales) Robert Hughes	£9,020	£5,000	£1,000
2009	(England) Darryl Fitton	3–1	(England) Ted Hankey	£9,520	£5,000	£1,500
2010	(England) Dave Prins	3–0	(Netherlands) Joey ten Berge	£9,520	£5,000	£1,500
2011	(England) Ted Hankey	4–1	(Netherlands) Ron Meulenkamp	£9,020	£5,000	£1,000
2012	(Netherlands) Jeffrey de Graaf	4–2	(Netherlands) Jan Dekker	£9,020	£5,000	£1,000
2013	(England) Stephen Bunting	4–2	(England) Darryl Fitton	£9,020	£5,000	£1,000
2014	(England) Robbie Green	5–1	(England) James Wilson	£10,320	£5,000	£1,000
2015	(England) Dennis Harbour	5–2	(England) Glen Durrant	£10,320	£5,000	£1,500
2016	(England) Tony O'Shea (84.06)	6–4	(England) Ryan Joyce (82.65)	£10,000	£3,000	£1,600
2017	(Wales) Martin Phillips	5–4	(England) Andy Fordham	£10,000	£3,000	£1,600
2018	(England) Glen Durrant (88.62)	5–3	(Netherlands) Chris Landman (81.21)	£10,000	£3,000	£1,600
2019	(England) Scott Waites	5–0	(Netherlands) Richard Veenstra	£10,500	£3,500	£1,600
2020	(Wales) Michael Warburton	5–2	(England) Martin Adams	£10,500	£3,500	£1,600
2022	(England) Dave Prins	5–2	(England) Ashley Hurrell	£10,500	£3,500	£1,600
2023	(England) Martyn Turner	5–3	(Scotland) Ryan Hogarth	£10,500	£3,500	£1,600
2024	Carl Wilkinson 86.11	5 – 2	(Wales) Deian Roberts (73.29)	£11,000	£5,000	£1,200
2025	Christian Perez 89.75	5 – 2	Carl Wilkinson 80.73	£11,000	£5,000	£1,200
2026	Jack Drayton 90.45	6 – 2	(England) Ben Townley	£10,920	£5,000	£1,000

=== Ladies ===
Year	Champion	Score	Runner-up	Total Prize Money	Champion	Runner-up
1986	(England) Sandra Woof	beat	(England) Kathy Wones			
1987	(England) Babs Evans	beat	(England) Mandy Solomons			
1988	(England) Sharon Colclough	beat	(England) Deta Hedman			
1989	(England) Sharon Colclough	3–1	(England) Sue Edwards			
1990	(England) Deta Hedman	beat	(England) Jane Stubbs			
1991	(England) Deta Hedman	3–0	(England) Sue Edwards			
1992	(England) Deta Hedman	3–2	(England) Karen Lawman			
1993	(England) Mandy Solomons	beat	(England) Tammy Montgomery			
1994	(Wales) Sandra Greatbatch	beat	(Wales) Rhian Speed			
1995	(England) Sharon Colclough	beat	(Wales) Sandra Greatbatch			
1996	(England) Deta Hedman	beat	(Wales) Sandra Greatbatch			
1997	(Wales) Sandra Greatbatch	beat	(England) Sharon Colclough			
1998	(England) Crissy Howat	beat	(England) Mandy Solomons			
1999	(Netherlands) Francis Hoenselaar	beat	(England) Trina Gulliver			
2000	(Netherlands) Francis Hoenselaar	beat	(England) Janice Butters			
2001	(England) Apylee Jones	3–0	(Netherlands) Francis Hoenselaar			
2002	(England) Crissy Howat	beat	(England) Mandy Solomons			
2003	(Scotland) Heather Draper	beat	(England) Shirley Witton			
2004	(England) Trina Gulliver	beat	(England) Dawn Standley			
2005	(Netherlands) Francis Hoenselaar	3–1	(England) Dee Bateman			
2006	(England) Trina Gulliver	beat	(Netherlands) Francis Hoenselaar			
2007	(Wales) Julie Gore	beat	(England) Trina Gulliver			
2008	(Wales) Julie Gore	beat	(England) Lisa Ashton			
2009	(Wales) Julie Gore	beat	(England) Lisa Ashton			
2010	(Wales) Julie Gore	3–2	(England) Deta Hedman			
2011	(England) Deta Hedman	beat	(England) Lisa Ashton			
2012	(Netherlands) Francis Hoenselaar	beat	(England) Deta Hedman			
2013	(Russia) Anastasia Dobromyslova	beat	(England) Lisa Ashton			
2014	(England) Lorraine Winstanley	5–4	(Netherlands) Sharon Prins			
2015	(Netherlands) Aileen de Graaf	5–2	(England) Lisa Ashton			
2016	(England) Lisa Ashton	4–3	(England) Deta Hedman			
2017	(England) Deta Hedman	4–3	(Netherlands) Aileen de Graaf			
2018	(England) Fallon Sherrock	4–3	(England) Lorraine Winstanley			
2019	(England) Laura Turner	4–2	(England) Deta Hedman	£5,000	£1,500	£700
2020	(England) Fallon Sherrock	4–2	(England) Beau Greaves	£5,000	£1,500	£700
2022	(England) Beau Greaves (99.13)	5–1	(England) Deta Hedman (76.18)	£5,000	£1,500	£700
2023	(England) Beau Greaves	5–1	(England) Rhian O'Sullivan	£5,000	£1,500	£700
2024	(England) Beau Greaves (83.17)	5–1	(Netherlands) Lerena Rietbergen (70.78)	£3,100	£1,200	£500
2025	(Wales) Eve Watson (70.95)	5–2	(Netherlands) Anca Zijlstra (66.09)	£3,100	£1,200	£500
2026	(England) Gemma Hayter (80.83)	5–1	(England) Steph Clarke (74.67)	£3,080	£1,000	£400

== Tournament records ==
- Most wins 3: (England) Ronnie Baxter.
- Most Finals 4: (England) Ronnie Baxter, (England) Alan Warriner.
- Most Semi Finals 6: (England) Martin Adams.
- Most Quarter Finals 12: (England) Martin Adams.
- Most Appearances 14: (England) Martin Adams.
- Most Prize Money won £6,605: (England) Darryl Fitton.
- Best winning average (114.65) : (England) Robbie Green v's (England) James Wilson, 2014, Final.
- Youngest Winner age 21: (Netherlands) Jeffrey de Graaf.
- Oldest Winner age 54: (England) Tony O'Shea.

== Isle of Man Classic ==
From 2014 a new tournament was created which would coincide with the Isle of Man Open, this was called the Isle of Man Classic. The weekend in which both tournaments occurred was then known as "The Isle of Man Darts Festival".

Year	Champion	Score	Runner-up	Total Prize Money	Champion	Runner-up
2014	(England) Scott Waites	4–0	(England) James Hurrell	£2,500	£750	£450
2015	(England) Glen Durrant	4–2	(England) Pip Blackwell	£2,500	£750	£450
2016	(England) Scott Mitchell (97.89)	6–2	(Belgium) Geert de Vos (84.21)	£5,000	£1,500	£700
2017	(England) Jamie Hughes	7–2	(Belgium) Geert de Vos	£5,000	£1,500	£700
2018	(England) Mark McGeeney	4–3	(England) Glen Durrant	£5,000	£1,500	£700
2019	(Netherlands) Richard Veenstra	4–1	(Netherlands) Willem Mandigers	£5,000	£1,500	£700
2020	(Scotland) Cameron Menzies	4–0	(England) Jason Heaver	£5,000	£1,500	£700
2022	(England) James Hurrell	6–3	(England) Luke Littler	£4,940	£1,400	£700
2023	(England) Luke Littler	5–4	(England) Martin Atkins	£4,940	£1,400	£700
2024	(Scotland) Jim McEwan (92.97)	5–2	(Jersey) Lewis Bell (84.29)	£4,940	£1,400	£700
2025	(Scotland) Jim McEwan (106.21) (2)	5–2	(Wales) Alex Williams (97.29)	£4,940	£1,500	£700
2026	(Netherlands) Moreno Blom (83.15)	5–1	(Catalonia) Daniel Zapata (74.86)	£5,040	£1,500	£700
