= 2013 World Masters (darts) =

Winmau World Masters

Tournament information
- Dates: 10–13 October
- Venue: Bonus Arena and Hull City Hall
- Location: East Riding of Yorkshire
- Country: England
- Organisation(s): BDO
- Format: Sets (best of 3 legs) for men, Legs for women, boys and girls
- Prize fund: £70,500
- Winner's share: £25,000 (men), £5,000 (women)
- High checkout: £1k (non-televised), £2k (televised)

Champion(s)
- (England) Stephen Bunting (men) (England) Deta Hedman (women) (England) Shaun Lovett (boys) (England) Casey Gallagher (girls)

The 2013 Winmau World Masters was a major tournament on the BDO/WDF calendar for 2013. It took place from 10 to 13 October, with 10 October play at the Bonus Arena for the non-stage matches, and 11–13 October play at the Hull City Hall, which hosted the stage element of the event for the third year.

Stephen Bunting and Julie Gore both attempted to defend the titles they won in 2012. Bunting was the top seed for the Men's competition after a successful year on the circuit, whilst Gore was third seed. Bunting successfully defended his title without dropping a set. In the women's event Gore was beaten in the last 16 by Maud Jackson. Deta Hedman beat Rachel Brooks 4–1 in the final.

== Seeds ==
Men

These are finalised on completion of the 2013 French Open on 31 August – 1 September. For the second consecutive year, there are 32 seeds (an increase from 8 between 2007 and 2011) with the Top 16 exempt until the Last 32 stage.

1. (England) Stephen Bunting
2. (England) James Wilson
3. (England) Scott Waites
4. (England) Darryl Fitton
5. (Netherlands) Jeffrey de Graaf
6. (England) Tony O'Shea
7. (Belgium) Geert De Vos
8. (Netherlands) Remco van Eijden
9. (England) Glen Durrant
10. (Netherlands) Jan Dekker
11. (England) Robbie Green
12. (England) Martin Atkins
13. (England) Gary Robson
14. (Scotland) Ross Montgomery
15. (England) Richie George
16. (Netherlands) Wesley Harms
17. (Wales) Jim Williams
18. (England) Scott Mitchell
19. (England) Paul Jennings
20. (Netherlands) Benito van de Pas
21. (England) Alan Norris
22. (Netherlands) Rick Hofstra
23. (England) Tony Eccles
24. (Netherlands) Willy van de Wiel
25. (Netherlands) Ron Meulenkamp
26. (Netherlands) Jimmy Hendriks
27. (England) John Walton
28. (England) Garry Thompson
29. (England) Sam Head
30. (Netherlands) Michel van der Horst
31. (England) Martin Adams
32. (England) Tom Gregory

19th seed Paul Jennings did not attend.

Women

These are finalised on completion of the 2013 French Open on 31 August – 1 September. The ladies seeds enter at the start of the competition however can not play each other until the quarter-final stage.

1. (England) Deta Hedman
2. (England) Trina Gulliver
3. (Wales) Julie Gore
4. (Russia) Anastasia Dobromyslova
5. (England) Fallon Sherrock
6. (England) Rachel Brooks
7. (Netherlands) Aileen de Graaf
8. (Germany) Irina Armstrong

There are no seedings in the boys or girls events.

== Men's Draw ==
Last 32 onwards.

Sets are best of 3 legs.

Last 32; Best of 5 sets Losers £250
1	(England) Stephen Bunting 92.51	3
(Greece) John Michael 89.55	0
16	(Netherlands) Wesley Harms 93.70	3
(Wales) David Neads 80.13	0
8	(Netherlands) Remco van Eijden 88.20	3
25	(Netherlands) Ron Meulenkamp 87.90	1
9	(England) Glen Durrant 91.76	3
(Sweden) Daniel Larsson 81.30	1
4	(England) Darryl Fitton 95.94	3
(England) Nigel Lamb 85.97	0
13	(England) Gary Robson 82.78	3
20	(Netherlands) Benito van de Pas 82.11	1
5	(Netherlands) Jeffrey de Graaf 91.88	0
(Netherlands) Danny Noppert 95.84	3
12	(England) Martin Atkins 90.52	2
(Sweden) Dennis Nilsson 91.14	3
2	(England) James Wilson 93.15	3
31	(England) Martin Adams 90.60	1
15	(England) Richie George 77.47	1
(England) Ryan Searle 80.57	3
7	(Belgium) Geert De Vos 89.77	3
(Latvia) Madars Razma 78.80	0
10	(Netherlands) Jan Dekker 90.94	3
23	(England) Tony Eccles 93.71	2
3	(England) Scott Waites 88.77	3
(England) Pip Blackwell 87.45	1
14	(Scotland) Ross Montgomery 99.34	3
(Wales) Mark Layton 92.85	1
6	(England) Tony O'Shea 80.27	1
(England) Andy Chalmers 80.40	3
11	(England) Robbie Green 84.45	3
22	(Netherlands) Rick Hofstra 81.67	1

Last 16; Best of 5 sets Losers £1,000
1	(England) Stephen Bunting 94.56	3
16	(Netherlands) Wesley Harms 80.64	0
8	(Netherlands) Remco van Eijden 88.38	3
9	(England) Glen Durrant 94.53	2
4	(England) Darryl Fitton 95.22	3
13	(England) Gary Robson 90.69	2
(Netherlands) Danny Noppert 94.92	3
(Sweden) Dennis Nilsson 78.57	0
2	(England) James Wilson 94.89	3
(England) Ryan Searle 90.72	1
7	(Belgium) Geert De Vos 80.73	0
10	(Netherlands) Jan Dekker 84.09	3
3	(England) Scott Waites 84.90	3
14	(Scotland) Ross Montgomery 86.07	0
(England) Andy Chalmers 87.63	0
11	(England) Robbie Green 97.44	3

Quarter-finals; Best of 5 sets Losers £1,500
1	(England) Stephen Bunting 96.96	3
8	(Netherlands) Remco van Eijden 81.93	0
4	(England) Darryl Fitton 94.83	3
(Netherlands) Danny Noppert 90.09	1
2	(England) James Wilson 87.36	3
10	(Netherlands) Jan Dekker 82.14	2
3	(England) Scott Waites 94.20	1
11	(England) Robbie Green 98.16	3

Semi-finals; Best of 11 sets Losers £3,000
1	(England) Stephen Bunting 98.58	6
4	(England) Darryl Fitton 90.33	0
2	(England) James Wilson 90.78	6
11	(England) Robbie Green 93.84	3

Final; Best of 13 sets Winner £25,000; Runner up £10,000
1	(England) Stephen Bunting 96.12	7
2	(England) James Wilson 93.90	0

== Ladies Draw ==
Last 8 onwards.

Quarter-finals; Best of 7 legs Losers £500
1	(England) Deta Hedman	4
8	(Germany) Irina Armstrong	3
5	(England) Fallon Sherrock	4
(England) Wendy Reinstadtler	2
(Sweden) Maud Jansson	3
6	(England) Rachel Brooks	4
7	(Netherlands) Aileen de Graaf	4
2	(England) Trina Gulliver	2

Semi-finals; Best of 7 legs Losers £750
1	(England) Deta Hedman 78.33	4
5	(England) Fallon Sherrock 73.53	1
6	(England) Rachel Brooks 73.26	4
7	(Netherlands) Aileen de Graaf 66.39	2

Final; Best of 7 legs Winner £5,000; Runner up £2,000
1	(England) Deta Hedman 76.38	4
6	(England) Rachel Brooks 66.57	1

== Boys Draw ==
Last 8 onwards.

Quarter-finals; Best of 7 legs
(Austria) Franko Giuliani	1
(Netherlands) Colin Roelofs	4
(England) Ryan Hanratty	2
(England) George Killington	4
(Netherlands) Kevin Doets	2
(England) Bradley Halls	4
(England) Shaun Lovett	4
(Northern Ireland) Jason Mcconnel	0

Semi-finals; Best of 7 legs
(Netherlands) Colin Roelofs	4
(England) George Killington	2
(England) Bradley Halls	1
(England) Shaun Lovett	4

Final; Best of 7 legs
(Netherlands) Colin Roelofs 80.37	2
(England) Shaun Lovett 75.15	4

== Girls Draw ==
Last 8 onwards.

Quarter-finals; Best of 7 legs
(Northern Ireland) Kayleigh O'Neill	4
(England) Casey Stephenson	1
(Netherlands) Kyana Frauenfelder	4
(England) Josie Paterson	3
(England) Casey Gallagher	4
(Denmark) Michelle Lindhardt	3
(England) Natasha Eaves	4
(Wales) Lauren Cain	0

Semi-finals; Best of 7 legs
(Northern Ireland) Kayleigh O'Neill	4
(Netherlands) Kyana Frauenfelder	1
(England) Casey Gallagher	4
(England) Natasha Eaves	3

Final; Best of 7 legs
(Northern Ireland) Kayleigh O'Neill 55.65	0
(England) Casey Gallagher 75.15	4

== Television coverage ==
Eurosport are scheduled to show the final session of play of the event across Europe.
