= 2013 BDO World Darts Championship =

Tournament information
- Dates: 5–13 January 2013
- Venue: Lakeside Country Club
- Location: Frimley Green, Surrey
- Country: England, United Kingdom
- Organisation(s): BDO
- Format: Sets; Finals: best of 13 (men's) best of 3 (women's)
- Prize fund: £274,000
- Winner's share: £100,000 (men), £10,000 (women's)
- High checkout: Bunting (167, men); Dobromyslova (144, women)

Champion(s)
- (England) Scott Waites (men) (Russia) Anastasia Dobromyslova (women)

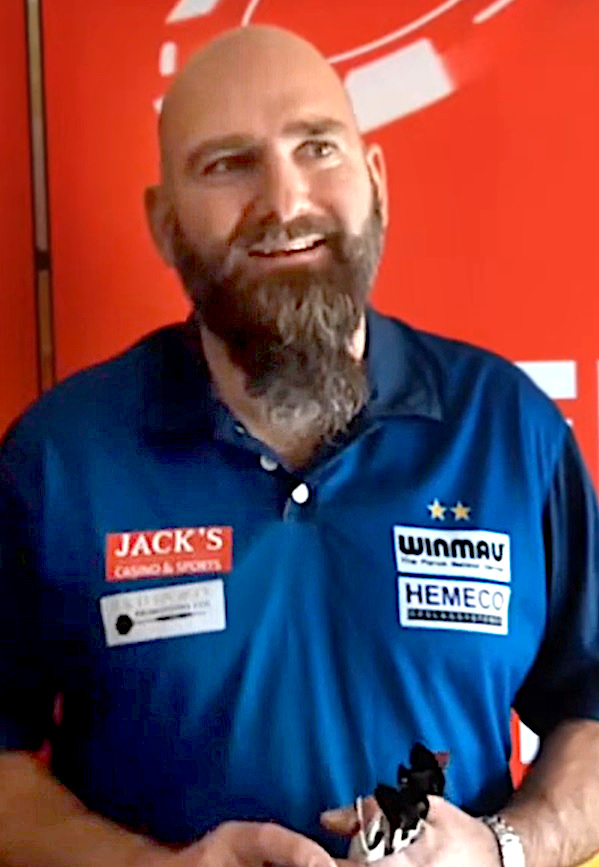
Scott Waites - Winner 2013

The 2013 BDO World Darts Championship (known for sponsorship reasons as the 2010 Lakeside World Professional Darts Championship) was the 36th World Championship organised by the British Darts Organisation, and the 28th staging at the Lakeside Country Club at Frimley Green. Christian Kist was the defending men's champion, having won the title for the first time in 2012, but was knocked out in the first round against Robbie Green. Scott Waites, the third seed and pre-tournament favourite, won his first world championship by defeating Tony O'Shea 7–1, who became the first man to lose his first three BDO World Championship finals. Anastasia Dobromyslova defended her world title by defeating Lisa Ashton & in doing so, won the world championship for the 3rd time.

Players competed to reach the BBC and ESPN televised finals, which ran from 5 to 13 January at Frimley Green.

== Format and qualifiers ==
=== Men's ===
The televised stages featured 32 players. The top 16 players in the BDO rankings over the 2011/12 season were seeded for the tournament.

Top 16
1. (England) Stephen Bunting
2. (England) Martin Adams
3. (England) Scott Waites
4. (England) Tony O'Shea
5. (England) Robbie Green
6. (Scotland) Ross Montgomery
7. (Netherlands) Jan Dekker
8. (Netherlands) Wesley Harms
9. (England) Alan Norris
10. (England) Gary Robson
11. (England) Martin Atkins
12. (England) Scott Mitchell
13. (England) Steve Douglas
14. (Belgium) Geert De Vos
15. (England) Richie George
16. (England) Darryl Fitton

Other qualifiers
1. (Netherlands) Jeffrey de Graaf
2. (Netherlands) Willy van de Wiel
3. (Netherlands) Benito van de Pas
4. (England) Tony Eccles
5. (England) Garry Thompson
6. (England) Paul Jennings
7. (Netherlands) Jimmy Hendriks
8. (England) James Wilson
9. (Scotland) Mark Barilli
10. (England) John Walton
11. (Netherlands) Christian Kist
12. (Scotland) Gary Stone

Hull qualifiers
1. (Wales) Wayne Warren
2. (England) Dave Prins
3. (Norway) Rohit David
4. (Republic of Ireland) Jason Cullen

=== Women's ===
The televised stages featured 8 players. The top 2 players in the WDF/BDO rankings over the 2011/12 season were seeded for the tournament.

Top 2
1. (England) Deta Hedman
2. (Russia) Anastasia Dobromyslova

Other qualifiers
1. (Wales) Julie Gore
2. (Germany) Irina Armstrong
3. (England) Lorraine Farlam
4. (England) Trina Gulliver

Hull qualifiers
1. (England) Lisa Ashton
2. (Netherlands) Sharon Prins

== Prize money ==
The prize money was £258,000 for the men's event and £16,000 for the women's event.

Men's Champion: £100,000
Runner-Up: £30,000
Semi-Finalists (2): £11,000
Quarter-Finalists (4): £6,000
Last 16 (8): £4,250
Last 32 (16): £3,000

Women's Champion: £10,000
Runner-Up: £2,000
Semi-Finalists (2): £1,000
Quarter-Finalists (4): £500

There was also a shared 9 Dart Checkout prize of £52,000, along with a High Checkout prize of £3,000 per event.

== Results bracket ==
=== Men's ===
The draw for the tournament was made on 13 October 2012 live on ESPN. Final set of the game must be won by two clear legs, in case of a 5-5 a sudden-death leg is played.

First Round (best of 5 sets); 5–7 January
1	(England) Stephen Bunting 91.83	3
(England) James Wilson 85.71	2
16	(England) Darryl Fitton 89.31	3
(Netherlands) Benito van de Pas 83.07	2
8	(Netherlands) Wesley Harms 85.11	3
Q	(Norway) Rohit David 76.29	1
9	(England) Alan Norris 79.98	3
Q	(Wales) Wayne Warren 84.48	1
4	(England) Tony O'Shea 86.73	3
(England) John Walton 88.65	0
13	(England) Steve Douglas 81.66	3
(Scotland) Gary Stone 83.01	1
5	(England) Robbie Green 91.11	3
(Netherlands) Christian Kist 85.68	1
12	(England) Scott Mitchell 80.88	3
(Scotland) Mark Barilli 77.49	2
2	(England) Martin Adams 83.97	2
(Netherlands) Jimmy Hendriks 78.78	3
15	(England) Richie George 81.66	3
Q	(England) Dave Prins 81.03	2
7	(Netherlands) Jan Dekker 85.26	3
(Netherlands) Jeffrey de Graaf 86.04	2
10	(England) Gary Robson 83.55	1
(England) Garry Thompson 88.83	3
3	(England) Scott Waites 90.15	3
(Netherlands) Willy van de Wiel 80.88	0
14	(Belgium) Geert De Vos 88.68	3
(England) Tony Eccles 90.84	2
6	(Scotland) Ross Montgomery 87.21	1
(England) Paul Jennings 87.12	3
11	(England) Martin Atkins 83.13	1
Q	(Republic of Ireland) Jason Cullen 88.74	3

Second round (best of 7); 8–9 January
1	(England) Stephen Bunting 95.70	2
16	(England) Darryl Fitton 93.69	4
8	(Netherlands) Wesley Harms 87.27	4
9	(England) Alan Norris 85.71	3
4	(England) Tony O'Shea 89.43	4
13	(England) Steve Douglas 79.86	1
5	(England) Robbie Green 83.37	4
12	(England) Scott Mitchell 77.58	1
(Netherlands) Jimmy Hendriks 77.38	2
15	(England) Richie George 84.08	4
7	(Netherlands) Jan Dekker 82.56	4
(England) Garry Thompson 84.99	3
3	(England) Scott Waites 89.35	4
14	(Belgium) Geert De Vos 81.39	1
(England) Paul Jennings 86.41	4
Q	(Republic of Ireland) Jason Cullen 84.69	0

Quarter-Finals (best of 9); 10–11 January
16	(England) Darryl Fitton 94.23	2
8	(Netherlands) Wesley Harms 94.83	5
4	(England) Tony O'Shea 94.77	5
5	(England) Robbie Green 91.71	3
15	(England) Richie George 83.19	5
7	(Netherlands) Jan Dekker 88.95	4
3	(England) Scott Waites 92.16	5
(England) Paul Jennings 85.19	2

Semi-Finals (best of 11); 12 January
8	(Netherlands) Wesley Harms 90.24	4
4	(England) Tony O'Shea 94.80	6
15	(England) Richie George 83.49	1
3	(England) Scott Waites 90.48	6

Final (best of 13); 13 January
4	(England) Tony O'Shea 81.90	1
3	(England) Scott Waites 86.43	7

=== Women's ===
- All matches best of three sets, best of five legs.

The results are:

Quarter-finals; 5–7 January
1	(England) Deta Hedman 73.83	1	2
Q	(England) Lisa Ashton 79.41	3	3
4	(Germany) Irina Armstrong 65.91	2	3	2
Q	(Netherlands) Sharon Prins 66.42	3	2	3
2	(Russia) Anastasia Dobromyslova 71.01	3	3
(England) Lorraine Farlam 70.95	1	1
3	(Wales) Julie Gore 65.40	2	2
(England) Trina Gulliver 73.47	3	3

Semi-finals; 10–11 January
Q	(England) Lisa Ashton 77.70	3	3
Q	(Netherlands) Sharon Prins 69.48	0	0
2	(Russia) Anastasia Dobromyslova 83.10	2	3	3
(England) Trina Gulliver 72.63	3	1	1

Final; 12 January
Q	(England) Lisa Ashton 80.40	1	3	1
2	(Russia) Anastasia Dobromyslova 82.29	3	1	3

== TV coverage ==
=== BBC Sport ===
BBC Sport coverage is presented by Colin Murray and Bobby George who will present live coverage and highlights. Rob Walker returns as Darts Extra host and reporter during the live coverage. Commentary comes from Tony Green, Vassos Alexander and Jim Proudfoot who replaces David Croft who moved to Sky F1 for 2012.

=== ESPN UK ===
ESPN coverage is presented by Ray Stubbs who returns to host his 11th Lakeside after previously hosting from 2001 to 2009 on the BBC. He will host with BDO players; Nat Coombs will be relief host and reporter. Commentary is shared with the BBC and comes from Green, Alexander and Proudfoot.

Both channels coverage comes from IMG Sports Media who provide the equipment, build the set, commentary boxes etc. and supply the output for both broadcasters.

== Statistics ==
=== Men ===
Player	Round	Played	Sets Won	Sets Lost	Legs Won	Legs Lost	100+	140+	180s	High Checkout	Average
(England) Martin Adams	First Round	1	2	3	10	10	30	13	4	131	83.97
(England) Martin Atkins	First Round	1	1	3	8	11	18	12	2	144	83.14
(Scotland) Mark Barilli	First Round	1	2	3	7	12	21	10	1	108	77.50
(England) Stephen Bunting	Second Round	2	5	6	24	22	64	26	11	167	94.00
(Republic of Ireland) Jason Cullen	Second Round	2	3	5	14	20	40	26	5	61	86.94
(Norway) Rohit David	First Round	1	1	3	5	11	14	8	0	110	76.29
(Netherlands) Jeffrey de Graaf	First Round	1	2	3	11	14	31	14	3	108	86.04
(Belgium) Geert De Vos	Second Round	2	4	6	15	21	48	18	5	116	85.07
(Netherlands) Jan Dekker	Quarter-finalist	3	11	10	49	40	107	40	12	150	85.75
(England) Steve Douglas	Second Round	2	4	5	15	18	32	15	7	100	80.83
(England) Tony Eccles	First Round	1	2	3	9	9	22	15	1	116	90.84
(England) Darryl Fitton	Quarter-finalist	3	9	9	40	39	93	56	19	116	92.64
(England) Richie George	Semi-finalist	4	13	14	50	61	150	62	20	129	83.09
(England) Robbie Green	Quarter-finalist	3	10	7	38	31	81	41	16	120	88.99
(Netherlands) Wesley Harms	Semi-finalist	4	16	12	64	54	180	84	15	161	89.88
(Netherlands) Jimmy Hendriks	Second Round	2	5	6	21	25	42	17	6	128	78.00
(England) Paul Jennings	Quarter-finalist	3	9	6	34	30	73	41	13	144	86.03
(Netherlands) Christian Kist	First Round	1	1	3	6	10	15	10	5	74	85.69
(England) Scott Mitchell	Second Round	2	4	6	18	21	53	20	2	130	78.88
(Scotland) Ross Montgomery	First Round	1	1	3	8	10	28	9	2	103	87.21
(England) Alan Norris	Second Round	2	6	5	23	22	54	27	15	125	83.61
(England) Tony O'Shea	Runner-up	5	19	15	72	65	192	96	30	161	90.09
(England) Dave Prins	First Round	1	2	3	12	14	28	15	3	40	81.03
(England) Gary Robson	First Round	1	1	3	7	10	17	9	2	100	83.54
(Scotland) Gary Stone	First Round	1	1	3	6	11	22	7	4	90	83.00
(England) Garry Thompson	Second Round	2	6	5	22	24	55	21	10	98	86.38
(Netherlands) Benito van de Pas	First Round	1	2	3	9	12	19	12	5	100	83.08
(Netherlands) Willy van de Wiel	First Round	1	0	3	4	9	14	7	2	32	80.87
(England) Scott Waites	Winner	5	25	5	83	35	162	78	24	156	89.56
(England) John Walton	First Round	1	0	3	5	9	17	10	3	100	88.64
(Wales) Wayne Warren	First Round	1	1	3	6	10	25	11	3	121	84.49
(England) James Wilson	First Round	1	2	3	7	12	16	13	2	86	85.71

Last updated: 12 January 2013
Source: Match reports from the main draw

=== Women ===
Player	Round	Played	Sets Won	Sets Lost	Legs Won	Legs Lost	100+	140+	180s	High Checkout	Average
(Germany) Irina Armstrong	Quarter-finalist	1	1	2	7	8	16	3	2	48	65.92
(England) Lisa Ashton	Runner-Up	3	5	2	17	10	38	14	1	120	79.28
(Russia) Anastasia Dobromyslova	Winner	3	6	2	21	12	60	12	2	144	80.39
(England) Lorraine Farlam	Quarter-finalist	1	0	2	2	6	7	6	0	40	71.52
(Wales) Julie Gore	Quarter-finalist	1	0	2	4	6	14	3	0	93	65.41
(England) Trina Gulliver	Semi-finalist	2	3	3	11	12	21	14	0	120	73.02
(England) Deta Hedman	Quarter-finalist	1	0	2	3	6	13	3	0	40	73.83
(Netherlands) Sharon Prins	Semi-finalist	2	2	3	8	13	19	10	1	47	67.20

Last updated: 13 January 2013
Source: Match reports from the main draw
