= 2011 BDO World Darts Championship =

Tournament information
- Dates: 1–9 January 2011
- Venue: Lakeside Country Club
- Location: Frimley Green, Surrey
- Country: England, United Kingdom
- Organisation(s): BDO
- Format: Sets; Finals: best of 13 (men's) best of 3 (women's)
- Prize fund: £329,000
- Winner's share: £100,000 (men's) £10,000 (women's)
- High checkout: 170 (England) Gary Robson

Champion(s)
- (England) Martin Adams (England) Trina Gulliver

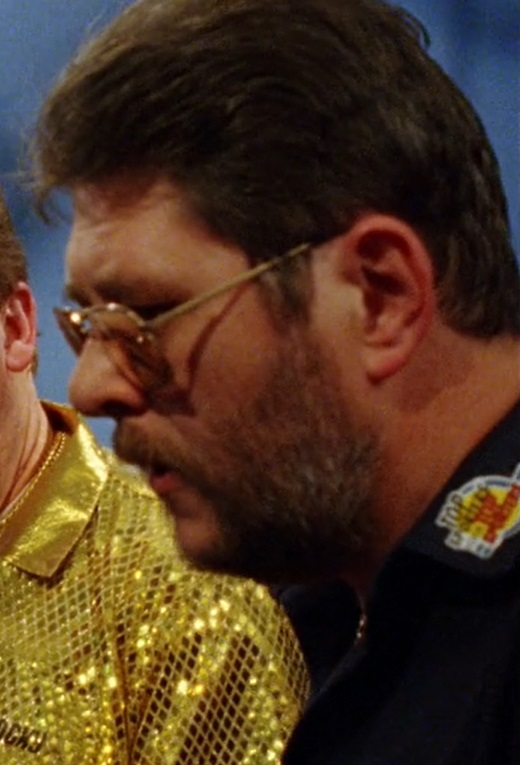
2011 BDO World Darts Champion - Martin Adams

The 2011 BDO World Darts Championship (known for sponsorship reasons as the 2011 Lakeside World Professional Darts Championship) was the 34th World Championship organised by the British Darts Organisation, and the 26th staging at the Lakeside Country Club at Frimley Green. Martin Adams was the defending men's champion, having won the title for the second time in the previous year's final against Dave Chisnall.

Adams became the first to successfully defend his BDO title since Raymond van Barneveld in 1999, as he beat Dean Winstanley, who is one of only a handful of players to reach the final at their first attempt. The final score was 7–5 in sets which saw Martin Adams retain the championship. Trina Gulliver successfully defended her Women's world title having beaten Rhian Edwards in a repeat of the 2010 final. It was Gulliver's ninth title.

The two standout matches of the tournament were Adams's victory over John Walton in the second round - the match going all the way to a sudden death leg - and Jan Dekker's comeback victory over Garry Thompson which was reminiscent of Chris Mason's comeback against Adams twelve years earlier (much like Adams in that match, Thompson missed nine darts at double to reach the semi-final).

Players competed to reach the BBC televised finals, which run from 1–9 January at Frimley Green.

== Format and qualifiers ==
=== Men's ===
The televised stages featured 32 players. The top 16 players in the individual rankings over the 2009/10 season were seeded for the tournament. Other places were made up of other qualifiers from the individual rankings, a number of qualifying spaces from the International Qualifiers (held in Hull on 28 October), and spaces for the 2008 & 2009 champions and 2010 semi-finalists if not already qualified and still eligible for the tournament. The draw took place on 12 November.

For the first time since the tournament's inception Australia was a notable absentee without any players involved.

This left England and Scotland as the only countries to be represented in each BDO World Championship since the very beginning.

Top 16
1. (England) Martin Adams
2. (England) Stuart Kellett
3. (England) Dean Winstanley
4. (England) Steve West
5. (Netherlands) Joey ten Berge
6. (England) Scott Waites
7. (Scotland) Ross Montgomery
8. (England) Tony O'Shea
9. (Netherlands) Willy van de Wiel
10. (England) Garry Thompson
11. (England) Brian Woods
12. (Scotland) Mark Barilli
13. (England) Gary Robson
14. (England) Robbie Green
15. (England) Scott Mitchell
16. (England) Dave Prins

Other qualifiers
1. (England) Martin Atkins
2. (England) Stephen Bunting
3. (England) Darryl Fitton
4. (England) Alan Norris
5. (England) John Walton
6. (England) Ross Smith
7. (England) Tony West
8. (England) Steve Douglas
9. (England) Dave Chisnall
10. (England) Ted Hankey
11. (Wales) Martin Phillips

Hull qualifiers
1. (England) Shaun Griffiths
2. (Scotland) Alan Soutar
3. (Netherlands) Jan Dekker
4. (Germany) Arno Merk
5. (England) Andy Boulton

=== Women's ===
The televised stages featured 8 players. The top 4 players in the individual rankings over the 2009/10 season were seeded for the tournament. Other places were made up of other qualifiers from the individual rankings, a number of qualifying spaces from the International Qualifiers ( held in Hull on 28 October), and spaces for the 2008 & 2009 champions and 2010 finalists if not already qualified and eligible for the tournament. The draw took place on 12 November.

Top 4
1. (England) Trina Gulliver
2. (England) Deta Hedman
3. (Wales) Julie Gore
4. (Russia) Irina Armstrong

Hull qualifiers
1. (England) Lorraine Farlam
2. (Belgium) Patricia De Peuter
3. (England) Wendy Reinstadtler

Other qualifiers
1. (Wales) Rhian Edwards

== Prize money ==
Men's Champion: £100,000
Runner-Up: £30,000
Semi-Finalists (2): £11,000
Quarter-Finalists (4): £6000
Last 16 (8): £4250
Last 32 (16): £3000

There was also a shared 9 Dart Checkout prize of £52,000, along with a High Checkout prize of £3000.

Women's Champion: £10,000 (up from £6,000)
Runner-Up: £2,000
Semi-Finalists (2): £1,000
Quarter-Finalists (4): £500

The total prize fund was £329,000 – a £4000 increase on last year. All levels of prize money remained the same as 2010 (except for the Ladies winner).

== Draw ==
=== Men's ===
- Match distances in sets are quoted in brackets at the top of each round. All sets best of five legs, unless there is a final set tie-break.

First Round (best of 5 sets)
1	(England) Martin Adams 92.52	3
(England) Tony West 86.58	1
16	(England) Dave Prins 76.86	1
(England) John Walton 81.15	3
8	(England) Tony O'Shea 84.24	1
(England) Ross Smith 84.39	3
9	(Netherlands) Willy van de Wiel 86.73	3
Q	(Scotland) Alan Soutar 88.44	1
4	(England) Steve West 84.39	2
(England) Dave Chisnall 86.52	3
13	(England) Gary Robson 87.78	3
(England) Steve Douglas 86.64	0
5	(Netherlands) Joey ten Berge 86.52	3
Q	(England) Shaun Griffiths 82.74	0
12	(Scotland) Mark Barilli 76.65	0
(Wales) Martin Phillips 86.07	3
2	(England) Stuart Kellett 94.35	3
(England) Darryl Fitton 87.91	0
15	(England) Scott Mitchell 81.39	0
Q	(Netherlands) Jan Dekker 84.93	3
7	(Scotland) Ross Montgomery 82.02	1
(England) Alan Norris 86.01	3
10	(England) Garry Thompson 78.06	3
Q	(Germany) Arno Merk 70.02	1
3	(England) Dean Winstanley 89.91	3
(England) Martin Atkins 92.40	2
14	(England) Robbie Green 90.25	3
Q	(England) Andy Boulton 83.18	0
6	(England) Scott Waites 91.17	3
(England) Ted Hankey 85.08	0
11	(England) Brian Woods 91.23	0
(England) Stephen Bunting 94.62	3

Second round (best of 7)
1	(England) Martin Adams 92.49	4
(England) John Walton 92.04	3
(England) Ross Smith 84.03	4
9	(Netherlands) Willy van de Wiel 81.63	1
(England) Dave Chisnall 91.17	1
13	(England) Gary Robson 90.54	4
5	(Netherlands) Joey ten Berge 82.41	3
(Wales) Martin Phillips 83.58	4
2	(England) Stuart Kellett 79.59	1
Q	(Netherlands) Jan Dekker 82.29	4
(England) Alan Norris 78.12	2
10	(England) Garry Thompson 79.95	4
3	(England) Dean Winstanley 89.25	4
14	(England) Robbie Green 85.98	1
6	(England) Scott Waites 86.85	2
(England) Stephen Bunting 89.79	4

Quarter-Finals (best of 9)
1	(England) Martin Adams 90.27	5
(England) Ross Smith 87.36	1
13	(England) Gary Robson 87.93	4
(Wales) Martin Phillips 86.97	5
Q	(Netherlands) Jan Dekker 87.78	5
10	(England) Garry Thompson 86.67	4
3	(England) Dean Winstanley 91.74	5
(England) Stephen Bunting 90.93	1

Semi-Finals (best of 11)
1	(England) Martin Adams 90.90	6
(Wales) Martin Phillips 85.89	4
Q	(Netherlands) Jan Dekker 85.92	2
3	(England) Dean Winstanley 89.91	6

Final (best of 13)
1	(England) Martin Adams 92.13	7
3	(England) Dean Winstanley 89.08	5

=== Women's ===
- All matches best of three sets, best of five legs.

Quarter-finals; 1–2 January
1	(England) Trina Gulliver 84.27	2
(England) Wendy Reinstadtler 70.29	0
4	(Russia) Irina Armstrong 71.52	2
(England) Lorraine Farlam 71.52	0
2	(England) Deta Hedman 66.24	2
(Belgium) Patricia De Peuter 64.00	1
3	(Wales) Julie Gore 67.95	1
WC	(Wales) Rhian Edwards 75.99	2

Semi-finals; 6 January
1	(England) Trina Gulliver 77.01	2
4	(Russia) Irina Armstrong 73.86	0
2	(England) Deta Hedman 60.84	0
WC	(Wales) Rhian Edwards 68.85	2

Final; 7 January
1	(England) Trina Gulliver 73.95	2
WC	(Wales) Rhian Edwards 73.86	0

== Television coverage ==
The tournament was again broadcast by BBC Sport, who have done so every year since its inception. Colin Murray reprised his role as host, after taking over from Ray Stubbs in 2010, Bobby George was again the main pundit, hosting with Colin Murray for live and afternoon coverage sometimes joining Rob Walker for the highlight shows, Bobby George has been the BBC main darts pundit since the early 2000s. Rob Walker, the Master of Ceremonies at BBC's snooker events and host of the BBC's 2009 Winmau World Masters continued to present the late night highlights and Darts Extra through the night on BBC2.

The commentary team was headed by David Croft, who has been commentating for the BBC since 2003 and Vassos Alexander, making his tournament debut covering for the ill Tony Green. Guest commentators included Martin Adams and Tony O'Shea.

Most of the weekend coverage was shown live on either BBC One or BBC Two, included both semi finals and the final itself. All other matches were shown live via the BBC's interactive coverage on its Red Button service.
