= 2014 BDO World Trophy =

Daily Mirror BDO World Trophy

Tournament information
- Dates: 30-3 January 2022
- Venue: Blackpool Tower
- Location: Blackpool
- Country: England, United Kingdom
- Organisation(s): BDO
- Format: Legs; Finals: best of 25 (men's) best of 13 (women's)
- Prize fund: £80,000 (men), £14,400 (women)
- Winner's share: £30,000 (men), £6,000 (women)
- High checkout: 170 (Netherlands) Jeffrey de Graaf

Champion(s)
- (England) James Wilson (men) (Russia) Anastasia Dobromyslova (women)

The 2014 Daily Mirror BDO World Trophy is the new major darts tournament run by the British Darts Organisation, hosted between 4–9 February 2014 at the Tower Ballroom, Blackpool. This event organized by the BDO Events - the new commercial arm of the British Darts Organisation

The Event marks the first BDO major event since the split in darts to not feature the BDO World Champion as Stephen Bunting left once he won the Lakeside Championships in 2014.

== Prize Fund ==
- Winner £30,000 (men), £6,000 (women)
- Runner Up £12,000 (men), £2,400 (women)
- Joint 3rd 2 x £5,000 (men), 2 x £1,000 (women)
- Joint 5th 4 x £2,500 (men), 4 x £500 (women)
- Joint 9th 8 x £1,250 (men), 8 x £250 (women)
- Joint 17th 16 x £500 (men)
- Totals £80,000 (men), £14,400 (women)
- Highest check out £1,000
- 9 Dart Finish pot £20,000
- Sum total prize fund £115,400

== Qualifiers ==
=== Men ===
Top 16 in Invitational rankings (seeds)
1. (England) ~~Stephen Bunting~~
2. (England) James Wilson
3. (England) Robbie Green
4. (Netherlands) Jan Dekker
5. (Netherlands) Remco van Eijden
6. (England) Darryl Fitton
7. (Netherlands) Jeffrey de Graaf
8. (England) Tony O'Shea
9. (England) Gary Robson
10. (England) Glen Durrant
11. (England) Scott Mitchell
12. (Scotland) Ross Montgomery
13. (England) Martin Adams
14. (England) Paul Jennings
15. (Netherlands) Rick Hofstra
16. (Wales) Jim Williams

WDF regional qualifiers
1. (Japan) Katsuya Aiba
2. (Australia) Harley Kemp
3. (Latvia) Madars Razma
4. (Canada) David Cameron
5. (Czech Republic) Karel Sedláček
6. (New Zealand) Mike Day
7. (United States) Jim Widmayer
8. (Netherlands) Jeroen Geerdink

17th in invitational rankings
1. (Netherlands) Wesley Harms

Qualifiers
1. (England) Michael Haynes
2. (England) Dave Prins
3. (England) Robert Rickwood
4. (England) Lee Williams

Wildcards
1. (England) Scott Waites (2013 World Champion)
2. (England) Andy Fordham
3. (England) Richie George

Alternate
1. (England) Alan Norris

Geert De Vos was ranked in the top 16 but asked not to be included in the draw. Alan Norris was given a wildcard to take Stephen Bunting's place after Bunting decided to switch to the PDC.

== Draw ==
=== Men ===
First Round (best of 11 legs); 6–7 Feb
Atl	(England) Alan Norris 87.09	6
WC	(England) Andy Fordham 79.16	2
16	(Wales) Jim Williams 93.02	6
WC	(England) Scott Waites 92.14	5
8	(England) Tony O'Shea 82.51	4
Q	(United States) Jim Widmayer 82.03	6
9	(England) Gary Robson 84.76	6
Q	(Netherlands) Jeroen Geerdink 76.29	1
5	(Netherlands) Remco van Eijden 84.38	6
(Netherlands) Wesley Harms 82.44	5
12	(Scotland) Ross Montgomery 92.58	6
Q	(New Zealand) Mike Day 80.26	1
4	(Netherlands) Jan Dekker 92.60	6
Q	(England) Lee Williams 84.82	5
13	(England) Martin Adams 73.04	6
Q	(England) Robert Rickwood	2
2	(England) James Wilson	6
WC	(England) Richie George	3
15	(Netherlands) Rick Hofstra	6
Q	(Latvia) Madars Razma	3
7	(Netherlands) Jeffrey de Graaf	6
Q	(England) Michael Haynes	4
10	(England) Glen Durrant	5
Q	(England) Dave Prins	6
6	(England) Darryl Fitton	6
Q	(Australia) Harley Kemp	5
11	(England) Scott Mitchell	6
Q	(Canada) David Cameron	0
3	(England) Robbie Green 91.61	1
Q	(Czech Republic) Karel Sedláček 93.81	6
14	(England) Paul Jennings 80.10	6
Q	(Japan) Katsuya Aiba 83.01	5

Last 16 (best of 13 legs); 8 Feb
Alt	(England) Alan Norris 84.54	7
16	(Wales) Jim Williams 78.45	3
Q	(United States) Jim Widmayer	1
9	(England) Gary Robson	7
5	(Netherlands) Remco van Eijden 86.74	4
12	(Scotland) Ross Montgomery 88.42	7
4	(Netherlands) Jan Dekker	4
13	(England) Martin Adams	7
2	(England) James Wilson	7
15	(Netherlands) Rick Hofstra	6
7	(Netherlands) Jeffrey de Graaf 88.47	7
Q	(England) Dave Prins 87.84	6
6	(England) Darryl Fitton 91.65	2
11	(England) Scott Mitchell 90.99	7
Q	(Czech Republic) Karel Sedláček 90.12	2
14	(England) Paul Jennings 91.87	7

Quarter-Finals (best of 19 legs); 9 Feb
Alt	(England) Alan Norris	5
9	(England) Gary Robson	10
12	(Scotland) Ross Montgomery	10
13	(England) Martin Adams	8
2	(England) James Wilson	10
7	(Netherlands) Jeffrey de Graaf	8
11	(England) Scott Mitchell	8
14	(England) Paul Jennings	10

Semi-Finals (best of 21 legs); 9 Feb
9	(England) Gary Robson	10
12	(Scotland) Ross Montgomery	11
2	(England) James Wilson	11
14	(England) Paul Jennings	2

Final (best of 25 legs); 9 Feb
12	(Scotland) Ross Montgomery 90.95	11
2	(England) James Wilson 90.20	13

== Qualifiers ==
=== Women ===
Top 8
1. (England) Deta Hedman
2. (England) Trina Gulliver
3. (England) Fallon Sherrock
4. (England) Rachel Brooks
5. (Russia) Anastasia Dobromyslova
6. (Netherlands) Aileen de Graaf
7. (Wales) Julie Gore
8. (Germany) Irina Armstrong

Invitational rankings
1. (England) Lorraine Farlam
2. (Netherlands) Sharon Prins

Wildcards
1. (England) Lisa Ashton
2. (England) Paula Jacklin

Qualifiers
1. (England) Dee Bateman
2. (Norway) Rachna David
3. (England) Casey Gallagher
4. (England) Sue Gulliver

==== Women ====
First Round (best of 7 legs); 6-7 Feb
1	(England) Deta Hedman 70.74	4
Q	(England) Casey Gallagher 62.10	0
8	(Germany) Irina Armstrong 79.89	4
Q	(England) Sue Gulliver 70.29	1
4	(England) Rachel Brooks 63.60	3
(Netherlands) Sharon Prins 64.50	4
5	(Russia) Anastasia Dobromyslova 76.56	4
(England) Lorraine Farlam 72.09	3
2	(England) Trina Gulliver 62.40	2
Q	(England) Dee Bateman 63.78	4
7	(Wales) Julie Gore 72.51	0
WC	(England) Lisa Ashton 74.22	4
3	(England) Fallon Sherrock 75.60	4
WC	(England) Paula Jacklin 73.86	2
6	(Netherlands) Aileen de Graaf 72.51	4
Q	(Norway) Rachna David 63.63	2

Quarter-Finals (best of 9 legs); 8 Feb
1	(England) Hedman 72.81	3
8	(Germany) Armstrong 76.50	5
(Netherlands) Prins 77.88	4
5	(Russia) Dobromyslova 86.10	5
Q	(England) Bateman 62.43	1
WC	(England) Ashton 76.02	5
3	(England) Sherrock 80.40	5
6	(Netherlands) de Graaf 79.14	4

Semi-Finals (best of 11 legs); 9 Feb
8	(Germany) Armstrong 74.37	3
5	(Russia) Dobromyslova 81.21	6
WC	(England) Ashton 82.74	6
3	(England) Sherrock 68.94	1

Final (best of 13 legs); 9 Feb
5	(Russia) Dobromyslova	9
WC	(England) Ashton	7

== Television coverage ==
Eurosport showed the event.
