= Joey ten Berge =

Dutch darts player (born 1985)

Personal information
- Nickname: "The Entertainer"
- Born: 18 October 1985 (age 41) The Hague, Netherlands
- Home town: The Hague, Netherlands

Sport
- Sport: Darts
- Playing since: 1998
- Laterality: Right-handed
- Walk-on music: "Voodoo People" by The Prodigy

Organisation (see split in darts)
- BDO: 2003–2013
- PDC: 2014–2016

WDF major events – best performances
- World Championship: Last 16: 2011
- World Masters: Quarter-finals: 2008, 2009
- Finder Masters: Quarter-finals: 2011
- Dutch Open: Quarter-finals: 2023

PDC premier events – best performances
- UK Open: Last 64: 2015, 2016

Other tournament wins
- Years
Austrian Open	2007
Swiss Open	2008
USA Dart Classic	2011
WDF Europe Youth Cup	2001
WDF World Cup Pairs	2007

Other achievements
- Open Noord West Nederland 2008; Open Oost Nederland 2007; Open Zuid Nederland 2009; Open Zuid Oost Nederland 2008

Joey ten Berge (born 18 October 1985) is a Dutch former darts player.

== Career ==
=== BDO ===
Ten Berge won the 2001 WDF Europe Youth Cup beating Sweden's Markus Korhonen in the final. Six years later, he captured his first professional title by capturing the 2007 Austrian Open, defeating Hungary's Nándor Bezzeg in the final. He followed up by winning the Open Oost Nederland a month later. He fell two games short of qualifying for the 2008 BDO World Darts Championship, losing to American Steve Brown and also fell two rounds short of making the televised stages of the 2007 Winmau World Masters, losing to Paul Gibbs.

Ten Berge won the 2008 Swiss Open, beating fellow Dutchman Edwin Max in the semi-finals and then beat England's Dave Prins in the final. He then reached the final of the Welsh Classic, losing to Scottish Open champion Garry Thompson.

He reached the televised stages of the 2008 World Masters, where he again beat Max to reach the quarter-finals, losing to Norway's Robert Wagner who won six straight legs for a 3–0 win in sets.

Ten Berge earned one of the non-seeded places for the 2009 BDO World Darts Championship, meaning he did not need to qualify for the event. He was drawn with 11th seed Martin Atkins in the first round and lost 2–3.

Seeded ninth in the 2010 BDO World Darts Championship, ten Berge exited in the first round following a 2–3 defeat by Brian Woods.

At the 2011 BDO World Darts Championship, ten Berge beat qualifier Shaun Griffiths 3–0 in the first round but lost in the second round 3–4 to Martin Phillips.

Ten Berge was unseeded for the 2012 BDO World Darts Championship, and was drawn to play third seed and the previous year's runner-up Dean Winstanley in the first round. Winstanley won the match 3–1. After a poor 2012, ten Berge ended up a lowly 286 in the world rankings and failed to qualify for the 2013 World Championships.

=== PDC ===
In January 2014, ten Berge entered PDC Q School. He reached the final round on the first day, losing 4–5 to Benito van de Pas, and eventually acquired a tour card through the Order of Merit. He lost in the third round of the UK Open in 2015 and 2016. His best finish on the PDC tour to date came at the first Players Championship of 2015, where he beat Colin Osborne, Prakash Jiwa and Brendan Dolan, before losing 2–6 to Ian White in the last 16.

Ten Berge has not participated in any event since March 2016.

== World Championship results ==
=== BDO ===
- 2009: 1st round (lost to Martin Atkins 2–3)
- 2010: 1st round (lost to Brian Woods 2–3)
- 2011: 2nd round (lost to Martin Phillips 3–4)
- 2012: 1st round (lost to Dean Winstanley 1–3)

== Performance timeline ==
Tournament	2007	2008	2009	2010	2011	2012
BDO World Championship	DNQ		1R	1R	2R	1R
Winmau World Masters	L40	QF	QF	L264	L136	L144
Finder Darts Masters	RR	RR	RR	RR	QF	DNQ

Performance Table Legend
DNP	Did not play at the event	DNQ	Did not qualify for the event	NYF	Not yet founded	L#	lost in the early rounds of the tournament (WR = Wildcard round, RR = Round robin)
QF	lost in the quarter-finals	SF	lost in the semi-finals	F	lost in the final	W	won the tournament
