= Martin Atkins (darts player, born 1965) =

English darts player

Personal information
- Nickname: The Assassin
- Born: 24 December 1965 (age 60) Leeds, Yorkshire, England
- Home town: Rawdon, West Yorkshire, England

Sport
- Sport: Darts
- Playing since: 1983
- Darts: 24g Red Dragon Martin Atkins 95% Tungsten
- Laterality: Right-handed
- Walk-on music: "Paranoid" by Black Sabbath

Organisation (see split in darts)
- BDO: 2002–2017, 2018
- PDC: 2018
- WDF: 2019–

WDF major events – best performances
- World Championship: Quarter Final: 2012
- World Masters: Semi Final: 2007
- World Trophy: Quarter Final: 2005
- Int. Darts League: Quarter Final: 2004, 2005
- Finder Masters: Quarter Final: 2009

Other tournament wins
- Tournament: Years
- BDO International Open British Open England Matchplay Finnish Open Northern Ireland Open WDF World Cup Team: 2015; 2012; 2012; 2006; 2009; 2011

Other achievements
- England Classic Warm Up 2010; England GP of Darts Bolton 2012

Martin Atkins (born 24 December 1965) is an English professional darts player. His nickname is The Assassin.

== Career ==
Atkins has been a Yorkshire county player since 1996 and has represented the England national side in many occasions including 3 times in the Six Nations, winning all three, and once in the World Cup in 2011, contributing to England's best performance since 1995. He reached the last 16 of the BDO World Professional Darts Championship in both 2006 and 2007. In 2006 he led Martin Adams 3–0 and had a match dart in the fifth leg of the fifth set, but ultimately lost 4–3. The following year, he was beaten by eventual finalist Phill Nixon.

He was seeded number 10 for the 2008 BDO World Darts Championship. However, he lost in the first round to Andy Boulton. The following year, unseeded, Atkins won his first round match 3–2 against Joey ten Berge before losing to Gary Robson 4–1.

Seeded number 10 for the 2010 BDO World Darts Championship, Atkins suffered another first round exit after he was defeated by Lakeside debutant Paul Carter 3–1. In 2011, Atkins was drawn against third seed and eventual runner-up Dean Winstanley in the first round, and lost 3–2 having missed two match darts in the fourth set.

Atkins finally progressed past the second-round stage of the World Championship when, in 2012, he defeated 7th seed John Walton and 10th seed Willy van de Wiel en route to a quarter-final match against Ted Hankey where he lost 5–1. In 2012, Atkins won the biggest title of his career so far by winning the BDO British Open, beating Robbie Green in the final. However, his season ended in disappointment when he lost in the first round of the World Championship to Jason Cullen.

Atkins was unseeded for the 2014 World Championship and faced eighth seed Jeffrey de Graaf in the first round. Despite competing with an elbow injury sustained on New Year's Day, and despite de Graaf throwing for two of the sets, Atkins won the match 3–0, finishing with a 135 checkout on the bullseye. However, Atkins had to withdraw during his second round match against Rick Hofstra while trailing 2–0 in sets.

=== PDC ===
Announced on 9 December 2017, he will be joining the Professional Darts Corporation for the first time in his career.

=== BDO ===
As of May 2018, it would seem he returned to the BDO circuit due to an unsuccessful run on the PDC circuit.

== World Championship results ==
=== BDO ===
- 2005: 1st round (lost to Robert Thornton 0–3)
- 2006: 2nd round (lost to Martin Adams 3–4)
- 2007: 2nd round (lost to Phil Nixon 1–4)
- 2008: 1st round (lost to Andy Boulton 2–3)
- 2009: 2nd round (lost to Gary Robson 1–4)
- 2010: 1st round (lost to Paul Carter 1–3)
- 2011: 1st round (lost to Dean Winstanley 2–3)
- 2012: Quarter-final (lost to Ted Hankey 1–5)
- 2013: 1st round (lost to Jason Cullen 1–3)
- 2014: 2nd round (withdrew while trailing Rick Hofstra 0–2)
- 2016: 2nd round (lost to Richard Veenstra 0–4)
- 2017: 1st round (lost to Jamie Hughes 1–3)

== Performance timeline ==
Tournament	2002	2003	2004	2005	2006	2007	2008	2009	2010	2011	2012	2013	2014	2015	2016	2017
BDO World Championship	DNQ			1R	2R	2R	1R	2R	1R	1R	QF	1R	WD	DNQ	2R	1R
BDO World Trophy	Not held												DNQ			1R
International Darts League	NH	DNQ	QF	QF	1R	1R	Not held									
World Darts Trophy	DNQ		1R	QF	2R	PR	Not held									
Winmau World Masters	DNQ	5R	QF	2R	4R	SF	5R	5R	2R	3R	4R	4R	3R	1R	1R	DNP
Finder Darts Masters	DNQ		RR	RR	NH	RR	RR	QF	DNQ			RR	DNQ		RR	DNQ

Performance Table Legend
DNP	Did not play at the event	DNQ	Did not qualify for the event	NYF	Not yet founded	L#	lost in the early rounds of the tournament (WR = Wildcard round, RR = Round robin)
QF	lost in the quarter-finals	SF	lost in the semi-finals	F	lost in the final	W	won the tournament
