= Irina Armstrong =

German darts player

Personal information
- Nickname: "Ice Baby"
- Born: 6 December 1970 (age 55) Vologda, Russian SFSR, Soviet Union
- Home town: Gangelt, Nordrhein-Westfalen, Germany

Sport
- Sport: Darts
- Playing since: 2001
- Darts: 23g Unicorn
- Laterality: Right-handed
- Walk-on music: "Ice Ice Baby" by Vanilla Ice

Organisation (see split in darts)
- BDO: 2001–2020
- WDF: 2001–
- Current world ranking: (WDF W) 8 (17 August 2026)

WDF major events – best performances
- World Championship: Semi Final: 2011
- World Masters: Semi Final: 2024
- World Trophy: Semi Final: 2014
- Finder Masters: Semi Final: 2009
- Dutch Open: Semi Final: 2011, 2022

Other tournament wins
- Years
Belgium Open	2006
Brabant Open	2002
Budapest Classic	2024
Czech Open	2009
Denmark Open	2011, 2012
Dortmund Open	2008
England Open	2009
Estonia Open	2012, 2013
Finnish Open	2007
Flanders Open	2008, 2009
French Open	2008, 2010, 2011, 2012
German Gold Cup	2008, 2009
Hungarian Open	2011
Iceland Masters	2023
Italian Open	2024, 2025, 2026
Luxembourg Open	2011
Riga Open	2023
Slovak Open	2023
Swedish Open	2011
Swiss Open	2010, 2011, 2013
Medal record
Women's Darts
Representing Russia
WDF World Cup
Gold medal – first place	2007 Rosmalen	Women's pairs
WDF Europe Cup
Bronze medal – third place	2008 Copenhagen	Women's pairs
Representing Germany
WDF World Cup
Silver medal – second place	2013 St. John's	Women's singles
Silver medal – second place	2015 Kemer	Women's team
WDF Europe Cup
Gold medal – first place	2014 Bucharest	Women's pairs
Bronze medal – third place	2014 Bucharest	Women's singles
Bronze medal – third place	2016 Egmond aan Zee	Women's pairs
Bronze medal – third place	2016 Egmond aan Zee	Women's team
Bronze medal – third place	2018 Budapest	Women's pairs

Irina Armstrong (Russian: Ирина Армстронг) née Loginova (born 6 December 1970) is a Russian-born German professional darts player who currently plays in the World Darts Federation (WDF) events. Her biggest achievement to date was advanced to semi-finals in the 2011 BDO World Darts Championship. She is a gold medalist in pairs competitions during the WDF World Cup and WDF Europe Cup.

== Career ==
Armstrong started out playing ten-pin bowling until she was pregnant and decided to pick up darts. She picked up wins in the singles and pairs events in the Belgium Open and Finland Open, and followed it up with a win in the German Open pairs with Carina Ekberg of Sweden. Armstrong's greatest achievement to date came at the 2007 WDF World Cup in Rosmalen, Netherlands, where she won the women' pairs title with Anastasia Dobromyslova.

Armstrong's performances in 2008 included wins in the French Open, Dortmund Open, German Gold Cup, Open Holland, and the Primus Masters. She was also the runner-up of the England Open, Swiss Open, and the Danish Open, and moved to as high as third in the world rankings.

Armstrong was overlooked for a place in the Zuiderduin Masters, a BDO major held in the Netherlands. Having missed out initially on an automatic place for the tournament by just one place, a spot was made available after Anastasia Dobromyslova withdrew from the competition, but it was given to Lisa Ashton. Still hoping for a wild card, the card was handed to German player Monique Lessmeister, who at the time was ranked 66 places below Armstrong in the world rankings.

Armstrong secured qualification for the Lakeside World Championship by winning the England Open. She also made up for last year's disappointment by ensuring qualification for the Zuiderduin.

== International appearances ==
Armstrong started her international career with her native Russia where she won a gold medal in the Ladies Pairs with Anastasia Dobromyslova. Armstrong always felt though that it was not right playing for Russia as she never played in any Russian ranking events in order to qualify for the team. Having lived in Germany for many years, and with the German organisation asking her on several occasions, Armstrong took time out from international appearances in order to be eligible for the German team. In 2013, she made her debut at the WDF World Cup singles for Germany in Canada where she finished runner up to England's Deta Hedman. This was not her debut for Germany though she had previously played in the Lorna Croft Friendship Cup, helping Germany to win it for the first time in its history. She also played for Germany in the WDF Europe Cup.

== Personal life ==
Armstrong is married, with two children.

== World Championship results ==
=== BDO/WDF ===
- 2010: Quarter-finals (lost to Deta Hedman 0–2) (sets)
- 2011: Semi-finals (lost to Trina Gulliver 0–2)
- 2013: Quarter-finals (lost to Sharon Prins 1–2)
- 2014: Quarter-finals (lost to Deta Hedman 0–2)
- 2015: First round (lost to Anastasia Dobromyslova 0–2)
- 2024: Second round (lost to Sophie McKinlay 1–2)
- 2025: First round (lost to Maria Carli 1–2)

=== PDC ===
- 2010: First round (lost to Deta Hedman 0–4) (legs)

== Performance timeline ==
Tournament	2006	2007	2008	2009	2010	2011	2012	2013	2014	2015	2016	2017	2018	2019	2020	2021	2022	2023	2024
BDO/WDF Ranked televised events
World Championship	DNQ				QF	SF	DNQ	QF	QF	1R	DNQ								2R
World Masters	2R	4R	QF	2R	4R	4R	1R	QF	4R	DNQ					NH		2R	NH	SF
World Trophy	NH								SF	1R	DNQ				NH				
Finder Masters	NH		DNQ	SF	DNQ	RR	DNQ							NH					
Dutch Open	DNP					SF	QF	6R	DNP	QF	DNP			6R	QF	NH	SF	DNP	4R
PDC Non-ranked televised events
Women's World Championship	NH				1R	NH													
