= Garry Thompson (darts player) =

English darts player

Personal information
- Nickname: "The Recliner"
- Born: 9 January 1965 (age 61) Doncaster, Yorkshire, England
- Home town: Silsden, Yorkshire, England

Sport
- Sport: Darts
- Playing since: 1986
- Darts: 21 Gram
- Laterality: Right-handed
- Walk-on music: "Glory Glory" by Geoffrey Oi!Cott

Organisation (see split in darts)
- BDO: 2004–2019

WDF major events – best performances
- World Championship: Quarter-final: 2010, 2011
- World Masters: Last 16: 2010
- Finder Masters: Last 24 Group: 2010

Other tournament wins
- Tournament: Years
- British Open Scottish Open Swedish Open Welsh Classic: 2013; 2008; 2012; 2008

Other achievements
- 2013 England National Championships; 2012 Lancashire Open; 2014 Lincolnshire Open; 2014 Teesside Open

Garry Thompson (born 9 January 1965) is an English former professional darts player who played in British Darts Organisation (BDO) tournaments.

== Career ==
Thompson reached the quarter-finals of the 2004 British Open, beating Tony David and Darryl Fitton before losing to Phill Nixon. He then reached the quarter-finals of the 2007 Belgium Open, again beating Fitton along the way. He lost to Robbie Turner.

On 17 February 2008 Thompson caused a major surprise by winning the 2008 Scottish Open, with notable wins against Steve Coote, World Masters champion Robert Thornton and former World Champion Martin Adams before beating Shaun Greatbatch in the final. He received £2,000 for his efforts and as a result, he shot up the BDO and WDF rankings. Thompson then won the unranked Welsh Classic, beating the Netherlands' Joey ten Berge in the final.

Thompson earned automatic qualification for the 2009 BDO World Championship, entering the tournament as the number 14 seed. He was drawn against Northern Ireland's Daryl Gurney in the first round but lost 3–1.

In 2009, Thompson reached the quarter-final stage in the German Open, IDPA Lakeside Classic and the Denmark Open but his defense of the Scottish Open ended in the early stages of the competition.

2010 saw Garry reach the quarter-finals of the World Championship. He defeated Ross Montgomery, the sixth seed, in the deciding set after Montgomery missed six darts to win the match. He then swept aside the previously impressive Martin McCloskey 4–1 with some much-improved finishing. In the quarter-final he took two sets off the eventual champion Martin Adams but was ultimately outplayed.

Thompson was seeded 10th for the 2011 BDO World Championship, and once again reached the quarter-final stage. He beat German teenager Arno Merk 3–1 in the first round, and Alan Norris 4–2 in the second round, but in the quarter-final he lost 5–4 to Jan Dekker having led 3-0 and 4–2 in sets and missing nine darts at doubles to win the match. Had Thompson won the match and gone on to win his semi-final as well, he would have played the final on his 46th birthday.

Thompson was unseeded for the 2012 BDO World Championship, and was defeated 3–1 by débutante Paul Jennings in the first round.

Thompson was once again unseeded at the 2013 BDO World Championship, but this time won his first round match 3–1 over Gary Robson. In the second round, Thompson was once again defeated by Dekker in a deciding set, 4–3, having led 3–2.

Thompson won the BDO British Open in 2013, arguably his biggest victory to date, beating James Wilson in the final. Despite this, Thompson only qualified for the 2014 World Championship as a preliminary and lost his prelim match to Jim Widmayer after leading 2–1 in sets and having several chances to break Widmayer's throw in the deciding set.

== World Championship results ==
=== BDO ===
- 2009: 1st round (lost to Daryl Gurney 1–3)
- 2010: Quarter-final (lost to Martin Adams 2–5)
- 2011: Quarter-final (lost to Jan Dekker 4–5)
- 2012: 1st round (lost to Paul Jennings 1–3)
- 2013: 2nd round (lost to Jan Dekker 3–4)
- 2014: Last 40 (lost to Jim Widmayer 2–3)

== Performance timeline ==
BDO

Tournament	2008	2009	2010	2011	2012	2013	2014	2015
BDO World Championship	DNQ	1R	QF	QF	1R	2R	PR	DNQ
Winmau World Masters	L40	L72	L16	L40	L32	L272	L272	L80
Finder Darts Masters	DNQ		RR	DNQ				

== Personal life ==
Garry currently resides in Silsden, West Yorkshire, with his partner Tina and son Jack.
