= Paul Jennings (darts player) =

English darts player

Personal information
- Nickname: Jenno
- Born: 22 September 1976 (age 50) Hartlepool, England

Sport
- Sport: Darts
- Playing since: 1983
- Darts: 23 gram DataDart JENNO
- Laterality: Right-handed
- Walk-on music: "Mr Brightside" by The Killers

Organisation (see split in darts)
- BDO: 2009–2016

WDF major events – best performances
- World Championship: Quarter Final: 2012, 2013
- World Masters: Last 24: 2010
- World Trophy: Semi Final: 2014

Other tournament wins
- Tournament: Years
- Cleveland Open Denmark Open Finnish Open Latvia Open Northumberland Open Police Masters Polish Open Swiss Open Welsh Open: 2009; 2012; 2011; 2011; 2010; 2011; 2013; 2011; 2010

Paul Jennings (born 22 September 1976) is an English former darts player who competed in British Darts Organisation (BDO) events.

== Career ==
A native of Hartlepool in the north-east of the country, Jennings came to wider attention when he qualified for the 2012 BDO World Darts Championship. After defeating Garry Thompson 3–1 in the first round, Jennings defeated Steve Douglas 4–2 in their second round clash. He lost to fellow tournament debutant Wesley Harms in the quarter-finals, being defeated 5–3 in sets.

Despite a difficult 2012 season, Jennings once again qualified for the BDO World Championship in 2013. His first round opponent was sixth seed Ross Montgomery. Montgomery was in control of the match when Jennings hit a 144 checkout to save the third set, followed by a 102 checkout to win it. Jennings proceeded to win the match 3–1. In the second round, Jennings continued his fine finishing with a comprehensive 4–0 victory over Jason Cullen. Jennings then played eventual champion Scott Waites in the quarter-finals, where he trailed 4-0 but won back two sets before eventually being defeated 5–2.

He has not participated in any event since September 2016.

== World Championship results ==
=== BDO ===
- 2012: Quarter-finals (lost to Wesley Harms 3–5)
- 2013: Quarter-finals (lost to Scott Waites 2–5)
- 2014: 1st round (lost to Wesley Harms 0–3)
- 2015: 1st round (lost to Darryl Fitton 0–3)

== Performance timeline ==
Tournament	2009	2010	2011	2012	2013	2014	2015
BDO World Championship	DNP			QF	QF	1R	1R
BDO World Trophy	Not held					SF	1R
Winmau World Masters	L136	L24	L72	L144	DNP	L144	L80

Performance Table Legend
W	Won the tournament	F	Finalist	SF	Semifinalist	QF	Quarterfinalist	#R; RR; L#	Lost in # round Round-robin; Last # stage	DQ	Disqualified
DNQ	Did not qualify	DNP	Did not participate	WD	Withdrew	NH	Tournament not held	#R; RR; L#	Lost in # round Round-robin; Last # stage	NYF	Not yet founded
