= 2012 World Masters (darts) =

Winmau World Masters

Tournament information
- Dates: 11–14 October
- Venue: Costello Stadium and Hull City Hall
- Location: East Riding of Yorkshire
- Country: England
- Organisation(s): BDO
- Format: Sets for men, Legs for women, boys and girls
- Prize fund: £70,500
- Winner's share: £25,000 (men), £5,000 (women)
- High checkout: £1,000 (non-televised), £2,000 (televised)

Champion(s)
- (England) Stephen Bunting (men) (Wales) Julie Gore (women) (Netherlands) Jeffrey de Zwaan (boys) (England) Fallon Sherrock (girls)

The 2012 Winmau World Masters was a major televised tournament on the BDO/WDF calendar for 2012. It took place from 11 to 14 October, with 11 October play at the Costello Stadium for the untelevised matches, and 12–14 October play at the Hull City Hall, which hosted the televised element of the event for the second time, taking over from the nearby Hull Arena who hosted for one year in 2011

Scott Waites and Lisa Ashton both attempted to defend their titles they won for the first time last year, however Stephen Bunting and Julie Gore took the main titles after Waites and Ashton lost their opening matches. This tournament was known for being Phill Nixon's last major tournament. Nixon died on 9 August 2013 from cancer.

== Seeds ==
Men

These were finalised on completion of the 2012 British Open on 31 August – 2 September. In a change to previous years, there are 32 seeds (an increase from 8 between 2007 and 2011) with the Top 16 exempt until the Last 32 stage, rather than 8 seeds being exempt until the last 16 stage.

1. (England) Stephen Bunting
2. (England) Martin Adams
3. (England) Scott Waites
4. (England) Robbie Green
5. (Netherlands) Wesley Harms
6. (England) Alan Norris
7. (England) Tony O'Shea
8. (Scotland) Ross Montgomery
9. (Netherlands) Jan Dekker
10. (England) Gary Robson
11. (England) Scott Mitchell
12. (England) Martin Atkins
13. (Belgium) Geert De Vos
14. (England) Steve Douglas
15. (England) Richie George
16. (Netherlands) Benito van de Pas
17. (England) Garry Thompson
18. (England) Paul Jennings
19. (England) John Walton
20. (England) Tony Eccles
21. (England) Darryl Fitton
22. (Wales) Martin Phillips
23. (Netherlands) Willy van de Wiel
24. (Netherlands) Christian Kist
25. (Scotland) Mark Barilli
26. (Netherlands) Jimmy Hendriks
27. (England) James Wilson
28. (Netherlands) Jeffrey de Graaf
29. (Wales) Wayne Warren
30. (Scotland) Gary Stone
31. (Scotland) Ewan Hyslop
32. (Northern Ireland) Daryl Gurney

Women

These were finalised on completion of the 2012 British Open on 31 August – 2 September. The ladies seeds enter at the start of the competition however can not play each other until the quarter-final stage.

1. (England) Deta Hedman
2. (Russia) Anastasia Dobromyslova
3. (Wales) Julie Gore
4. (Russia) Irina Armstrong
5. (England) Lorraine Farlam
6. (England) Trina Gulliver
7. (Netherlands) Tamara Schuur
8. (England) Dee Bateman

The defending champion Lisa Ashton was unseeded due to her relative inactivity on the Tour

There are no seedings in the boys or girls events.

== Men's Draw ==
Last 32 onwards. All the below matches were played on stage, with a number televised.

Sets are best of 3 legs.

Last 32; Best of 5 sets Losers £250
1	Stephen Bunting 91.40	3
(Netherlands) Rick Hofstra 85.94	2
16	(Netherlands) Benito van de Pas 81.63	3
17	(England) Garry Thompson 83.55	2
8	(Scotland) Ross Montgomery 88.23	3
25	(Scotland) Mark Barilli 82.26	2
9	(Netherlands) Jan Dekker 84.91	1
(Wales) Jim Williams 91.42	3
4	(England) Robbie Green 77.40	1
(England) Phill Nixon 81.66	3
13	(Belgium) Geert De Vos 85.74	1
(England) Sam Head 90.81	3
5	(Netherlands) Wesley Harms 87.99	3
28	(Netherlands) Jeffrey de Graaf 87.11	0
12	(England) Martin Atkins 83.76	2
(England) Dave Prins 85.44	3
2	(England) Martin Adams 85.77	1
(Norway) Rohit David 78.81	3
15	(England) Richie George 80.66	1
(Switzerland) Thomas Junghans 80.56	3
7	(England) Tony O'Shea 85.20	3
(England) David Pallett 84.48	1
10	(England) Gary Robson 90.94	3
(England) Glen Durrant 90.94	0
3	(England) Scott Waites 86.34	0
(Northern Ireland) Paul Brown 91.35	3
14	(England) Steve Douglas 84.44	3
19	(England) John Walton 81.75	2
6	(England) Alan Norris 96.68	0
27	(England) James Wilson 98.21	3
11	(England) Scott Mitchell 86.22	3
(England) Andy Boulton 88.32	1

Last 16; Best of 5 sets Losers £1,000
1	Stephen Bunting 94.14	3
16	(Netherlands) Benito van de Pas 90.48	2
8	(Scotland) Ross Montgomery 86.70	2
(Wales) Jim Williams 84.12	3
(England) Phill Nixon 73.26	3
(England) Sam Head 76.20	2
5	(Netherlands) Wesley Harms 86.97	3
(England) Dave Prins 88.56	1
(Norway) Rohit David 88.86	2
(Switzerland) Thomas Junghans 85.41	3
7	(England) Tony O'Shea 94.17	3
10	(England) Gary Robson 92.55	2
(Northern Ireland) Paul Brown 85.20	3
14	(England) Steve Douglas 77.64	1
27	(England) James Wilson 79.29	3
11	(England) Scott Mitchell 76.23	0

Quarter-finals; Best of 5 sets Losers £1,500
1	Stephen Bunting 94.38	3
(Wales) Jim Williams 80.40	1
(England) Phill Nixon 88.20	0
5	(Netherlands) Wesley Harms 99.30	3
(Switzerland) Thomas Junghans 76.08	1
7	(England) Tony O'Shea 82.68	3
(Northern Ireland) Paul Brown 100.20	3
27	(England) James Wilson 93.30	2

Semi-finals; Best of 9 sets Losers £3,000
1	Stephen Bunting 94.65	5
5	(Netherlands) Wesley Harms 85.41	3
7	(England) Tony O'Shea 90.48	5
(Northern Ireland) Paul Brown 89.28	1

Final; Best of 13 sets Winner £25,000; Runner up £10,000
1	Stephen Bunting 94.86	7
7	(England) Tony O'Shea 84.81	4

== Ladies Draw ==
Last 8 onwards. The Semi-finals and final were played on stage, with the final televised.

Quarter-finals; Best of 7 legs Losers £500
1	(England) Deta Hedman	4
8	(England) Dee Bateman	1
5	(England) Lorraine Farlam	4
(Japan) Mayumi Ōuchi	0
3	(Wales) Julie Gore	4
(England) Claire Ball	3
7	(Netherlands) Tamara Schuur	4
(England) Rachel Brooks	2

Semi-finals; Best of 7 legs Losers £750
1	(England) Deta Hedman 84.45	4
5	(England) Lorraine Farlam 74.73	3
3	(Wales) Julie Gore 80.16	4
7	(Netherlands) Tamara Schuur 67.26	0

Final; Best of 7 legs Winner £5,000; Runner up £2,000
1	(England) Deta Hedman 78.21	1
3	(Wales) Julie Gore 78.24	4

== Boys Draw ==
Last 8 onwards. The final was played on stage however this was not televised.

Quarter-finals; Best of 7 legs
(Belgium) Kenny Neyens	4
(England) Zak Cross	3
(Northern Ireland) Jason McConnell	2
(England) Scott Dale	4
(Netherlands) Jeffrey de Zwaan	4
(England) Jack Tweddell	1
(England) Jake Patchett	1
(Austria) Rowby-John Rodriguez	4

Semi-finals; Best of 7 legs
(Belgium) Kenny Neyens	4
(England) Scott Dale	2
(Netherlands) Jeffrey de Zwaan	4
(Austria) Rowby-John Rodriguez	1

Final; Best of 7 legs
(Belgium) Kenny Neyens	3
(Netherlands) Jeffrey de Zwaan	4

== Girls Draw ==
Last 8 onwards. The final was played on stage however this was not televised.

Quarter-finals; Best of 7 legs
(Sweden) Anja Danielsson	3
(Sweden) Sandra Pettersson	4
(Germany) Ann-Kathrin Wigmann	4
(England) Gemma Barrett	1
(Netherlands) Sharon Jansen	3
(England) Stacey Ellis	4
(England) Fallon Sherrock	4
(England) Natasha Eaves	0

Semi-finals; Best of 7 legs
(Sweden) Sandra Pettersson	1
(Germany) Ann-Kathrin Wigmann	4
(England) Stacey Ellis	0
(England) Fallon Sherrock	4

Final; Best of 7 legs
(Germany) Ann-Kathrin Wigmann	1
(England) Fallon Sherrock	4

== Television coverage ==
The tournament was shown in the UK by sports subscription channel ESPN for the second year. ESPN broadcast the last three days of the tournament, and televised the Last 8 of the Men's stage matches, the majority of the Last 32 and Last 16 of the Men's stage matches, and the final of the Ladies event.
