= Jason Cullen =

Irish darts player (born 1988)

Personal information
- Nickname: "The Whistler"
- Born: 11 June 1988 (age 38) Dublin, Ireland
- Home town: Enniscorthy, Ireland

Sport
- Sport: Darts
- Playing since: 2004
- Darts: 23 Gram Tungsten
- Laterality: Right-handed
- Walk-on music: "Whistle" by Flo Rida

Organisation (see split in darts)
- BDO: 2006–2015
- PDC: 2017–

WDF major events – best performances
- World Championship: Last 16: 2013
- World Masters: Last 72: 2009, 2011

PDC premier events – best performances
- UK Open: Last 160: 2019

Other tournament wins
- Tournament: Years
- INDO Ennis PDC Challenge Tour England: 2013; 2018

Jason Cullen (born 11 June 1988) is an Irish professional darts player who plays in Professional Darts Corporation (PDC) events.

== Darts career ==
Cullen represented the Republic of Ireland in the WDF Europe Cup Youth in 2004 and was runner-up in the Singles. He also played in the WDF World Cupin Perth and in 2012 he was in his national team for the WDF Europe Cup and the Six Nations Cup.

Cullen qualified for the 2013 BDO World Championship. In the first round he played the number 11 seed Martin Atkins and won 3–1, but lost to Paul Jennings in the Second round.

He won the fourth PDC Challenge Tour of 2018, defeating Cameron Menzies in the final. In 2019, he reached the final of the nineteenth PDC Challenge Tour event, losing to Kyle McKinstry.

== World Championship results ==
=== BDO ===
- 2013: 2nd Round (lost to Paul Jennings 0–4)
