= Jimmy Hendriks =

Dutch darts player (born 1994)

Personal information
- Nickname: "The Captain"
- Born: 19 March 1994 (age 32) Heemskerk, Netherlands
- Home town: Castricum, Netherlands

Sport
- Sport: Darts
- Playing since: 2000
- Darts: 22g Target
- Laterality: Right-handed
- Walk-on music: "Here I Go Again" by Whitesnake

Organisation (see split in darts)
- BDO: 2010–2017
- PDC: 2017–2024

WDF major events – best performances
- World Championship: Last 16: 2013
- World Masters: Last 80: 2012, 2013
- Finder Masters: Last 24 Group: 2012, 2016

PDC premier events – best performances
- World Championship: Last 64: 2023
- UK Open: Last 128: 2022
- PC Finals: Last 64: 2017

Other tournament wins
- Years
Antwerp Open	2016
Lithuania Open	2012
Finder Darts Masters (Youth)	2012
World Youth Masters	2011
WDF Europe Youth Cup	2011
WDF World Youth Cup	2011

Jimmy Hendriks (born 19 March 1994) is a Dutch darts player who formerly competed in British Darts Organisation (BDO) and Professional Darts Corporation (PDC) events.

== Career ==
=== BDO ===
Hendriks won the WDF World Youth Cup and World Youth Masters in 2011 and the Lithuania Open in 2012; 2012 proved to be a successful year for 18-year-old Hendriks who also made it to the quarter-final in the German Open, Welsh Masters and Swiss Open. He defeated the three-time BDO champion Martin Adams in the first round of the 2013 BDO World Darts Championship.

Hendriks has also seen success playing in pairs tournaments, achieving 2012 victories in the Isle-of-Man Pairs (with Tony O'Shea, the England Open Pairs (with Brian Dawson) and the German Open Pairs (with Scott Mitchell).

=== PDC ===
Hendriks entered the Professional Darts Corporation's Qualifying School in 2017. A last 16 finish on the third day and a last 8 finish on the fourth saw him finish second on the Q School Order of Merit to pick up a 2-year Tour Card.

== World Championship results ==
=== BDO ===
- 2013: Second round (lost to Richie George 2–4)
- 2017: Preliminary round (lost to David Cameron 1–3)

=== PDC ===
- 2023: Second round (lost to Brendan Dolan 1–3)

== Performance timeline ==
=== BDO ===
Tournament	2012	2013	2014	2015	2016	2017
BDO Ranked televised events
World Championship	DNQ	2R	DNQ			Prel.
World Masters	3R	3R	2R	1R	2R	DNP
Finder Darts Masters	RR	DNQ				

=== PDC ===
Tournament	2012	2014	2015	2016	2017	2018	2022	2023
PDC Ranked televised events
World Championship	BDO		DNQ	BDO		DNQ		2R
UK Open	BDO					DNQ	2R	2R
Players Championship Finals	BDO				1R	DNQ		
Non-ranked televised events
World Youth Championship	2R	3R	3R	3R	2R	RR	DNP	
Career statistics
Year-end ranking	NR				91	79	92	90

==== European Tour ====
Season	1	2	3	4	5	6	7	8	9	10	11	12	13
2017	GDC; DNQ	GDM; DNQ	GDO; 1R	EDG; DNQ	GDT; DNQ	EDM; 2R	ADO; DNQ	EDO; DNQ	DDM; 2R	GDG; DNQ	IDO; DNQ	EDT; DNQ	
2019	Did not qualify						DDM; 1R	Did not qualify					
2022	IDO; DNP	GDC; 1R	Did not qualify										

==== Players Championships ====
Season	1	2	3	4	5	6	7	8	9	10	11	12	13	14	15	16	17	18	19	20	21	22	23	24	25	26	27	28	29	30
2018	BAR; 1R	BAR; 2R	BAR; 2R	BAR; 3R	MIL; 4R	MIL; 3R	BAR; 2R	BAR; 2R	WIG; 1R	WIG; 2R	MIL; 1R	MIL; 1R	WIG; 2R	WIG; 1R	BAR; 2R	BAR; 1R	BAR; 1R	BAR; 1R	DUB; 3R	DUB; 1R	BAR; 1R	BAR; 2R								
2022	BAR; 2R	BAR; 3R	WIG; 1R	WIG; 1R	BAR; 2R	BAR; 1R	NIE; 2R	NIE; 1R	BAR; 1R	BAR; 1R	BAR; 1R	BAR; 2R	BAR; 1R	WIG; 1R	WIG; 1R	NIE; 2R	NIE; 2R	BAR; 1R	BAR; 2R	BAR; 1R	BAR; 2R	BAR; 1R	BAR; 3R	BAR; 1R	BAR; 1R	BAR; 2R	BAR; 2R	BAR; 1R	BAR; 1R	BAR; 1R
2023	BAR; 1R	BAR; 1R	BAR; 1R	BAR; 1R	BAR; 1R	BAR; 1R	HIL; 1R	HIL; 1R	WIG; 1R	WIG; 2R	LEI; QF	LEI; 2R	HIL; 1R	HIL; 1R	LEI; 1R	LEI; 1R	HIL; 2R	HIL; 1R	BAR; 3R	BAR; 1R	BAR; 2R	BAR; 2R	BAR; 1R	BAR; 2R	BAR; 1R	BAR; 1R	BAR; 1R	BAR; 1R	BAR; 1R	BAR; 2R

Performance Table Legend
W	Won the tournament	F	Finalist	SF	Semifinalist	QF	Quarterfinalist	#R; RR; L#	Lost in # round Round-robin; Last # stage	DQ	Disqualified
DNQ	Did not qualify	DNP	Did not participate	WD	Withdrew	NH	Tournament not held	#R; RR; L#	Lost in # round Round-robin; Last # stage	NYF	Not yet founded
