= 2010 BDO World Darts Championship =

Tournament information
- Dates: 2–10 January 2010
- Venue: Lakeside Country Club
- Location: Frimley Green, Surrey
- Country: England, United Kingdom
- Organisation(s): BDO
- Format: Sets; Finals: best of 13 (men's) best of 3 (women's)
- Prize fund: £325,000
- Winner's share: £100,000 (men's) £6,000 (women's)
- High checkout: 170 (England) Martin Adams

Champion(s)
- (England) Martin Adams (England) Trina Gulliver

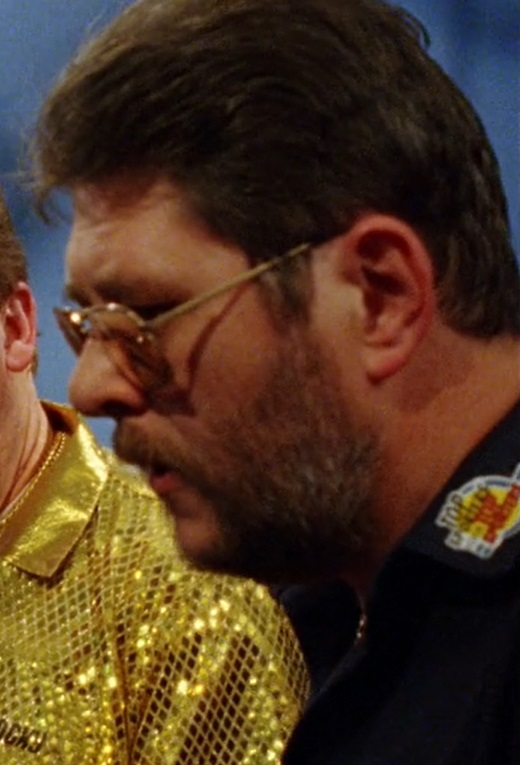
2010 BDO World Darts Champion - Martin Adams

The 2010 BDO World Darts Championship (known for sponsorship reasons as the 2010 Lakeside World Professional Darts Championship) was the 33rd World Championship organised by the British Darts Organisation, and the 25th staging at the Lakeside Country Club at Frimley Green. Ted Hankey was the defending men's champion having won the title for the second time in the previous year's final against Tony O'Shea. The defending women's champion was Francis Hoenselaar, having beaten seven-time champion Trina Gulliver in the 2009 final.

Players from 32 countries around the globe competed to reach the BBC televised finals, which ran from 2–10 January at Frimley Green. The men's top seed was O'Shea. Julie Gore was top women's seed, ahead of Gulliver. There were 11 debutants at the world championships. Also for the first time two brothers, Tony and Steve West, were playing in the same world championship.

The tournament is also remembered for the first round match between Martin Adams and Anthony Fleet, which featured what has been called "the worst leg of darts ever". The opening leg included visits of 26, 41, 5, 41, 22 and 11 by a visibly nervous Fleet. Adams himself had visits of 47, 44 and 32, but eventually won the 54-dart leg and went on to win the match 3–0. Fleet's match average of 65.34 was the lowest of the championship and described as "pub standard".

Martin Adams won his second World Championship title, beating Dave Chisnall 7–5 in the final. Trina Gulliver won the Women's Championship for the eighth time beating Rhian Edwards 2–0.

== Format and qualifiers ==
=== Men's ===
The televised stages featured 32 players. The top 16 players in the WDF/BDO rankings over the 2008/09 season were seeded for the tournament. An unusually high total of 11 of the seeded players were knocked out in the first round.

The 32 players who qualified for invitation into the first round proper of the men's singles were:

Top 16
1. (England) Tony O'Shea
2. (England) Scott Waites
3. (England) Martin Adams
4. (England) Darryl Fitton
5. (England) Ted Hankey
6. (Scotland) Ross Montgomery
7. (England) Dave Prins
8. (England) Alan Norris
9. (Netherlands) Joey ten Berge
10. (England) Martin Atkins
11. (England) Steve West
12. (England) John Walton
13. (Scotland) Mark Barilli
14. (England) Scott Mitchell
15. (Scotland) John Henderson
16. (England) Ian White

Other qualifiers
1. (Netherlands) Willy van de Wiel
2. (England) Stephen Bunting
3. (England) Brian Woods
4. (Netherlands) Mareno Michels
5. (Norway) Robert Wagner
6. (Northern Ireland) Daryl Gurney
7. (England) Gary Robson
8. (Wales) Martin Phillips
9. (Scotland) Paul Hanvidge
10. (England) Dave Chisnall
11. (England) Garry Thompson
12. (Republic of Ireland) Martin McCloskey
13. (England) Robbie Green
14. (England) Tony West
15. (England) Paul Carter
16. (Australia) Tony Fleet

=== Women's ===
The televised stages featured 8 players. The top 4 players in the WDF/BDO rankings over the 2008/09 season were seeded for the tournament.

The eight women qualified for invitation were:

Top 4
1. (Wales) Julie Gore
2. (England) Trina Gulliver
3. (Russia) Irina Armstrong
4. (England) Karen Lawman

Other qualifiers
1. (Netherlands) Francis Hoenselaar
2. (England) Linda Ithurralde
3. (England) Deta Hedman
4. (Wales) Rhian Edwards

== Prize money ==
The 2010 World Championship had a prize fund of £325,000 – a rise of £5,000 on the previous year.

Men's Champion: £100,000 (up from £95,000)
Runner-up: £30,000
Semi-Finalists (2): £11,000
Quarter-Finalists (4): £6,000
Second Round (8): £4,250
First Round (16): £3,000

Women's Champion: £6,000
Runner-up: £2,000
Semi-Finalists (2): £1,000
Quarter-Finalists (4): £500

Nine dart finish: £52,000
Highest checkout: £3,000

== Draw ==
=== Men's ===
- Match distances in sets are quoted in brackets at the top of each round. All sets best of five legs, unless there is a final set tie-break

First Round (best of 5 sets)
1	(England) Tony O'Shea 86.58	3
(England) Robbie Green 86.07	2
16	(England) Ian White 83.88	0
(England) Stephen Bunting 91.62	3
8	(England) Alan Norris 90.24	2
(Norway) Robert Wagner 86.25	3
9	(Netherlands) Joey ten Berge 89.52	2
(England) Brian Woods 95.73	3
5	(England) Ted Hankey 92.52	3
(England) Gary Robson 83.22	0
12	(England) John Walton 82.35	2
(Netherlands) Willy van de Wiel 78.87	3
4	(England) Darryl Fitton 86.55	1
(England) Dave Chisnall 90.21	3
13	(Scotland) Mark Barilli 81.15	1
(England) Tony West 79.89	3
2	(England) Scott Waites 86.79	3
(Scotland) Paul Hanvidge 70.38	0
15	(Scotland) John Henderson 84.99	3
(Netherlands) Mareno Michels 78.78	1
7	(England) Dave Prins 80.22	0
(Wales) Martin Phillips 91.41	3
10	(England) Martin Atkins 87.18	1
(England) Paul Carter 83.61	3
6	(Scotland) Ross Montgomery 76.61	2
(England) Garry Thompson 75.51	3
11	(England) Steve West 83.79	2
(Republic of Ireland) Martin McCloskey 79.74	3
3	(England) Martin Adams 86.16	3
(Australia) Tony Fleet 65.34	0
14	(England) Scott Mitchell 85.83	2
(Northern Ireland) Daryl Gurney 91.11	3

Second round (best of 7)
1	(England) Tony O'Shea 94.53	4
(England) Stephen Bunting 93.96	0
(Norway) Robert Wagner 89.97	4
(England) Brian Woods 88.47	3
5	(England) Ted Hankey 86.94	4
(Netherlands) Willy van de Wiel 82.35	1
(England) Dave Chisnall 96.84	4
(England) Tony West 86.04	2
2	(England) Scott Waites 91.44	4
15	(Scotland) John Henderson 89.01	1
(Wales) Martin Phillips 87.60	4
(England) Paul Carter 83.10	2
(England) Garry Thompson 85.80	4
(Republic of Ireland) Martin McCloskey 83.40	1
3	(England) Martin Adams 94.35	4
(Northern Ireland) Daryl Gurney 85.41	1

Quarter-Finals (best of 9)
1	(England) Tony O'Shea 88.80	5
(Norway) Robert Wagner 83.91	1
5	(England) Ted Hankey 88.36	4
(England) Dave Chisnall 90.42	5
2	(England) Scott Waites 91.62	4
(Wales) Martin Phillips 92.13	5
(England) Garry Thompson 87.12	2
3	(England) Martin Adams 95.79	5

Semi-Finals (best of 11)
1	(England) Tony O'Shea 88.29	3
(England) Dave Chisnall 97.32	6
(Wales) Martin Phillips 92.94	4
3	(England) Martin Adams 97.38	6

Final (best of 13)
(England) Dave Chisnall 93.42	5
3	(England) Martin Adams 95.01	7

=== Women's ===
- All matches best of three sets, best of five legs

Quarter-finals; 2–3 January
4	(England) Karen Lawman 75.60	2
(England) Linda Ithurralde 73.86	0
1	(Wales) Julie Gore 61.05	0
(Wales) Rhian Edwards 68.64	2
3	(Russia) Irina Armstrong 67.20	0
(England) Deta Hedman 71.49	2
2	(England) Trina Gulliver 80.37	2
(Netherlands) Francis Hoenselaar 76.20	0

Semi-finals; 7 January
4	(England) Karen Lawman 73.56	0
(Wales) Rhian Edwards 73.92	2
(England) Deta Hedman 71.79	0
2	(England) Trina Gulliver 79.68	2

Final; 8 January
(Wales) Rhian Edwards 68.25	0
2	(England) Trina Gulliver 80.52	2

== Television coverage ==
The tournament has been broadcast by BBC Sport every year since its inception. Having fronted their coverage since 2001, Ray Stubbs did not host their broadcasts in 2010 following his decision to join ESPN the previous summer. He was replaced by BBC Radio 5 Live and Football on Five presenter Colin Murray. Rob Walker, the Master of Ceremonies at BBC's snooker events and host of the BBC's 2009 World Masters coverage presented the late night highlights and Darts Extra through the night on BBC2. Walker was also the roaming reporter during BBC2's live coverage. Bobby George once again was the pundit.

The commentary team was David Croft, Tony Green and the tournament's number 1 seed Tony O'Shea. Again, every dart was shown live, via the BBC's interactive coverage on its Red Button service – with the semi-finals and final both broadcast live on BBC1/BBC2 on the last weekend.

In Germany the tournament was broadcast by Eurosport. There was no coverage on SBS in the Netherlands, for the first time in several years as they chose to follow the majority of their players who featured in the PDC World Championship instead.
