= Estonian Open =

Estonian Open may refer to:

- Estonian Open (darts)
- Estonian Open (disc golf)

== See also ==
- Estonian Cup
