= Lorna Croft Friendship Cup =

Tournament information
- Established: 2006
- Organisation(s): Dutch Darts Association; German Darts Association
- Format: Legs
- Month(s) Played: December
- Final Year: 2015

Final champion(s)
- Netherlands (overall team); Aileen de Graaf (women's singles); Remco van Eijden (men's singles)

The Lorna Croft Friendship Cup was an annual darts match contested between the nations of Germany and the Netherlands.

== History ==
The event was created as a tribute to and the trophy was named in honour of Lorna Croft, the deceased wife of Olly Croft, the then Chairman of the British Darts Organisation. First held in 2006 as a women's only competition, only in 2013 was a men's competition held for the first time. The 2014 edition was moved to the following March because both darts associations had full schedules.

Both teams consisted of eight women and eight men. The women competed against one other in singles and pairs events and a team competition. Likewise for the men. A singles tournament was held on the last day that offered both the men's and women's winners entry in the qualifying rounds for the World Masters. The points totals from the men's and women's events were then added together for a combined score to determine the overall winner of the competition.

The 2015 edition of the competition was the last, because as of 2016, it and the Challenge of the Lowlands tournament will be replaced with a new event featuring the four nations of Belgium, Germany, Luxembourg and the Netherlands.

== Winners ==
Year	Winners	Result	Runners-up	Ref
2006	Netherlands	115–109	Germany	
2007	Netherlands	131–91	Germany	
2008	Netherlands	143–73	Germany	
2009	Netherlands	137–97	Germany	
2010	Netherlands		Germany	
2011	Germany	118–108	Netherlands	
2012	Germany		Netherlands	
2013	Netherlands	249–182	Germany	
2014	Netherlands	273–197	Germany	

== Singles Finals ==
Year		Winners	Result	Runners-up	Ref
2006	Women	(Germany) Heike Ernst	4–3	(Netherlands) Rilana Erades	
2007	Women	(Netherlands) Francis Hoenselaar	4–3	(Netherlands) Karin ten Kate	
2008	Women	(Netherlands) Tamara Schuur	4–2	(Germany) Michelle Sossong	
2009	Women	(Netherlands) Francis Hoenselaar	4–2	(Netherlands) Karin Krappen	
2010	Women	(Netherlands) Tamara Schuur	4–1	(Netherlands) Aileen de Graaf	
2011	Women	(Netherlands) Karin Krappen	4–0	(Netherlands) Aileen de Graaf	
2012	Women	(Netherlands) Aileen de Graaf	5–2	(Netherlands) Karin Krappen	
2013	Women	(Netherlands) Rilana Erades	5–3	(Netherlands) Sharon Prins	
2013	Men	(Netherlands) Jeffrey de Zwaan	5–3	(Netherlands) Jeffrey de Graaf	
2014	Women	(Netherlands) Aileen de Graaf	5–1	(Netherlands) Anca Zijlstra	
2014	Men	(Netherlands) Remco van Eijden	5–1	(Germany) Ingo Vogt	
