= Brian Woods (darts player) =

English darts player (born 1966)

Personal information
- Nickname: "Pecker"
- Born: 9 November 1966 (age 59) Whitehaven, England
- Home town: Arbroath, Scotland

Sport
- Sport: Darts
- Playing since: 1988
- Darts: 22.5G A180 Pecker Darts
- Laterality: Right-handed
- Walk-on music: "The Edge of Glory" by Lady Gaga

Organisation (see split in darts)
- BDO: 2003–2011
- PDC: 2011–2020

WDF major events – best performances
- World Championship: Semi-Final: 2008
- World Masters: Quarter-Final: 2005, 2006
- Finder Masters: Last 24 Group: 2009

PDC premier events – best performances
- UK Open: Last 64: 2015, 2017
- Grand Slam: Group Stages: 2008, 2009

Other tournament wins
- Years
Elgin Open	2008, 2009, 2012
England Classic Money in Money Out	2010
England Masters	2009
England National Ch'ships	2003
IDPA Lakeside Classic	2007
IDPA White Rose Classic	2008
Isle of Man Open	2005
Peterhead Open	2008
Pontins May Day Darts Festival	2008
Portland Open	2013
Tops of Holland	2009
Ukrainian Club Open Carlisle	2008, 2011

Brian Woods (born 9 November 1966) is a former English professional darts player. He used the nickname Pecker for his matches.

== Career ==
Woods has competed on the BDO/WDF circuit for several years. He won the National Singles title 2003 and the Isle of Man Open title in 2005. He has also reached the semi-finals of the English Open in 2003, the Welsh Masters in 2007 and the British Open in 2007. He has also made it to the quarter-finals of the Scottish Open in 2005 and the televised Winmau World Masters in 2005 and 2006.

He made his World Championship debut in 2006, but was drawn against #1 seed Mervyn King and lost 0–3. The following year, he also went out in the first round to Niels de Ruiter 0–3. Woods then produced his best run of his career so far at the 2008 World Championship beating Paul Hanvidge, Co Stompé and Scott Waites, the number three seed, before losing 3–6 to Simon Whitlock in the semi-finals.

He has continued his good form from Lakeside in 2008 by gain ranking points in most of the events he has entered and won the Pontins May Day Festival Singles Title, the mixed Doubles Title, with doubles partner and English International Trisha Wright, IDPA White Rose Classic, The Peterhead Open and the Elgin Open. In the 2009 BDO World Championship Woods was beaten in first round by the eventual World Champion, Ted Hankey, having claimed Hankey "would be lucky to get nil!".

Woods returned to Lakeside for the 2010 BDO World Championship, having won one of four qualifying places in the Inter-Playoffs in Bridlington. He unexpectedly won his first round match against Joey ten Berge, before being defeated by Robert Wagner in the sudden death leg, in a match considered by some to be one of the best in recent memory.

At the 2011 BDO World Darts Championship, Woods, the number 11 seed, was beaten 3–0 in the first round to Stephen Bunting. He has also twice competed in the Grand Slam of Darts.

Woods also took part in the UK Open in Bolton, 2011 and went out in the first round, losing 4–1 to Mark Hylton.

== World Championship results ==
=== BDO ===
- 2006: First round (lost to Mervyn King 0–3)
- 2007: First round (lost to Niels de Ruiter 0–3)
- 2008: Semi-final (lost to Simon Whitlock 3–6)
- 2009: First round (lost to Ted Hankey 0–3)
- 2010: Second round (lost to Robert Wagner 3–4)
- 2011: First round (lost to Stephen Bunting 0–3)

== Performance timeline ==
Tournament	2003	2004	2005	2006	2007	2008	2009	2010	2011
BDO World Championship	Did not qualify			1R	1R	SF	1R	2R	1R
Winmau World Masters	L128	L64	QF	QF	L40	L40	L72	L24	PDC
Finder Darts Masters	Did not qualify			NH	DNQ	RR	RR	DNQ	PDC
Grand Slam of Darts	Not yet founded				DNQ	RR	RR	DNQ	

Performance Table Legend
DNP	Did not play at the event	DNQ	Did not qualify for the event	NYF	Not yet founded	#R	lost in the early rounds of the tournament (WR = Wildcard round, RR = Round robin)
QF	lost in the quarter-finals	SF	lost in the semi-finals	F	lost in the final	W	won the tournament
