= 2012 BDO World Darts Championship =

Tournament information
- Dates: 7–15 January 2012
- Venue: Lakeside Country Club
- Location: Frimley Green, Surrey
- Country: England, United Kingdom
- Organisation(s): BDO
- Format: Sets; Finals: best of 13 (men's) best of 5 (women's)
- Prize fund: £329,000
- Winner's share: £100,000 (men's) £10,000 (women's)
- High checkout: Men: (England) Tony O'Shea (170) QF; Women: (Wales) Rhian Edwards (155) Rd 1

Champion(s)
- Men: (Netherlands) Christian Kist; Women: (Russia) Anastasia Dobromyslova

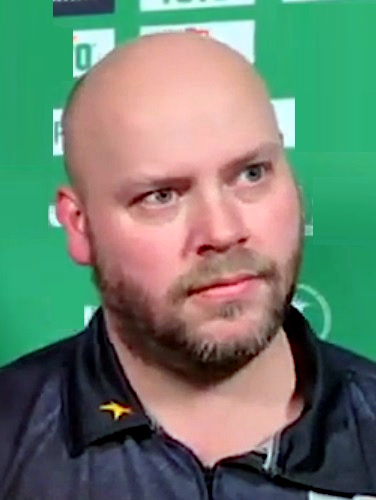
2012 BDO World Darts Champion - Christian Kist

The 2012 BDO World Darts Championship (known for sponsorship reasons as the 2012 Lakeside World Professional Darts Championship) was the 35th BDO World Darts Championship organised by the British Darts Organisation, and the 27th staging at the Lakeside Country Club at Frimley Green. It took place from January 7th to January 15th.

The tournament was won by Christian Kist, an unseeded team who was making their début at the event; Kist beat Tony O'Shea 7–5 in the final. Two-time defending champion Martin Adams lost in the quarter-finals against O'Shea.

The defending women's champion Gulliver, a nine-time winner of the event, lost in the semi-finals to Anastasia Dobromyslova. Dobromyslova then beat Deta Hedman in the final to win her second world title.

It was the first time that neither champion was from Great Britain (Christian Kist from the Netherlands and Anastasia Dobromyslova from Russia), despite both losing finalists coming from England (Tony O'Shea and Deta Hedman).

Both men's semi-finals were the subject of controversy. In the first, between Ted Hankey and Christian Kist, Hankey complained repeatedly about the air conditioning at the venue, claiming it was blowing his darts off course. Hankey later alleged that this was done deliberately, as he would be joining the PDC after the tournament. This was days after a similar incident at the rival PDC World Championship, which led to Adrian Lewis and James Wade walking off the stage due to a draft. Referring to that incident, Martin Adams, a BDO board member, had said before the event started: “I can promise there will be no gusts of wind blowing across the stage.” Then, in the second semi-final, between Tony O'Shea and Wesley Harms, the players left the stage so the board could be replaced following 23 bounce outs.

Players from five countries including a record number of eight Dutch players took part in the tournament.

== Format and qualifiers ==
=== Men's ===
The televised stages featured 32 players. The top 16 players in the WDF/BDO rankings over the 2010/11 season were seeded for the tournament.

The 32 players who qualified for invitation into the first round proper of the men's singles were:

Top 16
1. (England) Martin Adams
2. (England) Scott Waites
3. (England) Dean Winstanley
4. (England) Robbie Green
5. (England) Gary Robson
6. (Netherlands) Jan Dekker
7. (England) John Walton
8. (England) Tony O'Shea
9. (Scotland) Ross Montgomery
10. (Netherlands) Willy van de Wiel
11. (England) Tony West
12. (England) Paul Jennings
13. (Netherlands) Wesley Harms
14. (Netherlands) Benito van de Pas
15. (England) Ted Hankey
16. (Netherlands) Ron Meulenkamp

Other qualifiers
1. (Wales) Martin Phillips
2. (Netherlands) Joey ten Berge
3. (England) Steve Douglas
4. (England) Darryl Fitton
5. (England) Scott Mitchell
6. (England) Garry Thompson
7. (Netherlands) Fabian Roosenbrand
8. (England) Steve West
9. (England) Alan Norris
10. (England) Martin Atkins
11. (England) Andy Boulton
12. (England) Dave Prins
13. (Scotland) Gary Stone
14. (Netherlands) Christian Kist
15. (Belgium) Geert De Vos
16. (England) Clive Barden

=== Women's ===
The televised stages featured 8 players. The top 4 players in the WDF/BDO rankings over the 2010/11 season were seeded for the tournament.

The eight women qualified for invitation were:

Top 4
1. (England) Deta Hedman
2. (Wales) Julie Gore
3. (England) Trina Gulliver
4. (England) Lorraine Farlam

Other qualifiers
1. (England) Karen Lawman
2. (Russia) Anastasia Dobromyslova
3. (England) Lisa Ashton
4. (Wales) Rhian Edwards

== Prize money ==
The prize money was £258,000 for the men's event and £16,000 for the women's event.

Men's Champion: £100,000
Runner-Up: £30,000
Semi-Finalists (2): £11,000
Quarter-Finalists (4): £6,000
Last 16 (8): £4,250
Last 32 (16): £3,000

Women's Champion: £10,000
Runner-Up: £2,000
Semi-Finalists (2): £1,000
Quarter-Finalists (4): £500

There was also a shared 9 Dart Checkout prize of £52,000, along with a High Checkout prize of £3,000 per event.

== Results bracket ==
The draw for the tournament was made on 7 November 2011 live on ESPN.

=== Men's ===
- Match distances in sets are quoted in brackets at the top of each round. All sets are best of five legs, unless there is a final set tie-break. (The final set must be won by two clear legs; if it reaches 5–5, the 11th leg is decisive.)

The results are:

First Round (best of 5 sets); 7–9 January
1	(England) Martin Adams 90.12	3
(England) Scott Mitchell 79.47	0
16	(Netherlands) Ron Meulenkamp 82.98	0
(Scotland) Gary Stone 88.68	3
8	(England) Tony O'Shea 88.80	3
(England) Steve West 75.63	0
9	(Scotland) Ross Montgomery 87.99	3
(Netherlands) Fabian Roosenbrand 80.10	1
4	(England) Robbie Green 87.42	3
(England) Darryl Fitton 81.60	1
13	(Netherlands) Wesley Harms 82.32	3
(Wales) Martin Phillips 79.38	1
5	(England) Gary Robson 75.33	0
(England) Steve Douglas 83.76	3
12	(England) Paul Jennings 83.94	3
(England) Garry Thompson 84.30	1
2	(England) Scott Waites 89.52	3
(England) Andy Boulton 88.74	1
15	(England) Ted Hankey 88.08	3
(England) Clive Barden 79.85	2
7	(England) John Walton 86.94	1
(England) Martin Atkins 87.42	3
10	(Netherlands) Willy van de Wiel 83.01	3
(England) Dave Prins 78.24	0
3	(England) Dean Winstanley 88.74	3
(Netherlands) Joey ten Berge 86.70	1
14	(Netherlands) Benito van de Pas 90.18	2
(England) Alan Norris 91.95	3
6	(Netherlands) Jan Dekker 96.33	2
(Netherlands) Christian Kist 97.77	3
11	(England) Tony West 83.94	1
(Belgium) Geert De Vos 84.09	3

Second round (best of 7); 10–11 January
1	(England) Martin Adams 90.78	4
(Scotland) Gary Stone 86.97	0
8	(England) Tony O'Shea 90.48	4
9	(Scotland) Ross Montgomery 87.63	1
4	(England) Robbie Green 84.99	1
13	(Netherlands) Wesley Harms 90.72	4
(England) Steve Douglas 82.23	2
12	(England) Paul Jennings 82.86	4
2	(England) Scott Waites 86.73	3
15	(England) Ted Hankey 85.14	4
(England) Martin Atkins 89.73	4
10	(Netherlands) Willy van de Wiel 87.02	2
3	(England) Dean Winstanley 91.92	3
(England) Alan Norris 89.28	4
(Netherlands) Christian Kist 96.51	4
(Belgium) Geert De Vos 87.21	2

Quarter-finals (best of 9); 12–13 January
1	(England) Martin Adams 92.49	2
8	(England) Tony O'Shea 94.02	5
13	(Netherlands) Wesley Harms 87.39	5
12	(England) Paul Jennings 85.86	3
15	(England) Ted Hankey 85.08	5
(England) Martin Atkins 87.00	1
(England) Alan Norris 90.19	1
(Netherlands) Christian Kist 93.67	5

Semi-finals (best of 11); 14 January
8	(England) Tony O'Shea 85.35	6
13	(Netherlands) Wesley Harms 88.38	5
15	(England) Ted Hankey 87.54	5
(Netherlands) Christian Kist 89.73	6

Final (best of 13); 15 January
8	(England) Tony O'Shea 87.78	5
(Netherlands) Christian Kist 90.00	7

=== Women's ===
- All matches best of three sets, best of five legs.

The results are:

Quarter-finals; 7–9 January
1	(England) Deta Hedman 73.20	2
(Wales) Rhian Edwards 73.71	1
4	(England) Lorraine Farlam 67.35	2
(England) Karen Lawman 67.35	1
2	(Wales) Julie Gore 63.39	0
(Russia) Anastasia Dobromyslova 73.92	2
3	(England) Trina Gulliver 73.80	2
(England) Lisa Ashton 71.97	0

Semi-finals; 12 January
1	(England) Deta Hedman 79.11	2
4	(England) Lorraine Farlam 74.61	1
(Russia) Anastasia Dobromyslova 69.75	2
3	(England) Trina Gulliver 72.88	0

Final; 13 January
1	(England) Deta Hedman 74.13	1
(Russia) Anastasia Dobromyslova 73.95	2

== Statistics ==
=== Men ===
Player	Played	Sets Won	Sets Lost	Legs Won	Legs Lost	100+	140+	180s	High Checkout	Average
(Netherlands) Christian Kist	5	25	15	93	67	179	133	33	129	92.45
(England) Tony O'Shea	5	23	15	86	65	217	111	23	170	88.52
(Netherlands) Wesley Harms	4	17	11	63	50	178	79	11	120	87.46
(England) Ted Hankey	4	17	12	62	54	137	89	23	145	86.47
(England) Martin Atkins	3	8	8	33	33	76	42	11	136	88.05
(England) Alan Norris	3	8	10	27	40	91	42	22	130	90.33
(England) Martin Adams	3	9	5	31	26	95	40	11	161	91.36
(England) Paul Jennings	3	10	8	38	37	94	53	9	120	84.38
(England) Scott Waites	2	6	5	25	22	68	26	5	156	87.73
(England) Dean Winstanley	2	6	5	25	22	59	32	12	160	90.68
(England) Robbie Green	2	4	5	16	19	41	18	9	76	86.20
(Scotland) Ross Montgomery	2	4	5	16	21	63	20	7	120	87.79
(Netherlands) Willy van de Wiel	2	5	4	17	17	45	25	5	101	85.58
(Belgium) Geert De Vos	2	5	5	21	22	44	24	10	121	85.89
(England) Steve Douglas	2	5	4	20	18	45	23	6	121	82.71
(Scotland) Gary Stone	2	3	4	15	16	36	23	7	120	88.23
(England) Gary Robson	1	0	3	3	9	17	4	1	68	75.33
(Netherlands) Jan Dekker	1	2	3	10	12	22	15	5	81	96.33
(England) John Walton	1	1	3	9	9	19	13	3	97	86.94
(England) Tony West	1	1	3	6	11	22	6	2	80	83.94
(Netherlands) Benito van de Pas	1	2	3	9	12	26	11	3	119	90.18
(Netherlands) Ron Meulenkamp	1	0	3	4	9	19	5	1	71	82.98
(England) Clive Barden	1	2	3	8	12	20	11	2	160	79.86
(England) Andy Boulton	1	1	3	6	11	22	11	1	65	88.74
(England) Darryl Fitton	1	1	3	7	10	16	10	7	72	81.60
(England) Scott Mitchell	1	0	3	4	9	18	10	0	16	79.48
(Wales) Martin Phillips	1	1	3	6	11	27	6	2	65	79.38
(England) Dave Prins	1	0	3	2	9	14	2	1	74	78.24
(Netherlands) Fabian Roosenbrand	1	1	3	7	9	15	7	2	83	80.10
(Netherlands) Joey ten Berge	1	1	3	7	11	21	8	4	92	86.70
(England) Garry Thompson	1	1	3	7	9	18	10	4	118	84.30
(England) Steve West	1	0	3	2	9	15	4	1	40	75.63

Last updated: 13 January 2011
Source: Match reports from the main draw

=== Women ===
Player	Played	Sets Won	Sets Lost	Legs Won	Legs Lost	100+	140+	180s	High Checkout	Average
(Russia) Anastasia Dobromyslova	3	6	1	20	8	45	13	0	90	72.71
(England) Deta Hedman	3	5	4	19	20	47	12	3	119	75.71
(England) Lorraine Farlam	2	3	3	14	14	37	11	1	125	70.92
(England) Trina Gulliver	2	2	2	8	7	24	2	2	95	72.76
(England) Karen Lawman	1	1	2	6	7	21	7	1	88	67.34
(Wales) Rhian Edwards	1	1	2	5	6	9	9	0	155	73.70
(England) Lisa Ashton	1	0	2	1	6	4	5	0	16	71.96
(Wales) Julie Gore	1	0	2	1	6	8	0	0	50	63.39

Last updated: 13 January 2011
Source: Match reports from the main draw

== Broadcasting ==
The tournament was broadcast jointly in the UK by the BBC and ESPN. The BBC broadcast the afternoon session of the opening weekend, afternoon highlights from 9 to 13 January, the first semi final and the final. ESPN broadcast the evening session of the opening weekend, round two matches, the quarter-finals, the second semi final and highlights of the final. The BBC's coverage was presented by Colin Murray with Bobby George being the pundit. ESPN's coverage was presented by Ray Stubbs and Nat Coombs. Commentary on both channels came from David Croft, Tony Green and Vassos Alexander. The tournament was also screened on Eurosport and Eurosport Asia in 99 other countries.
