= Mark Barilli =

Scottish darts player

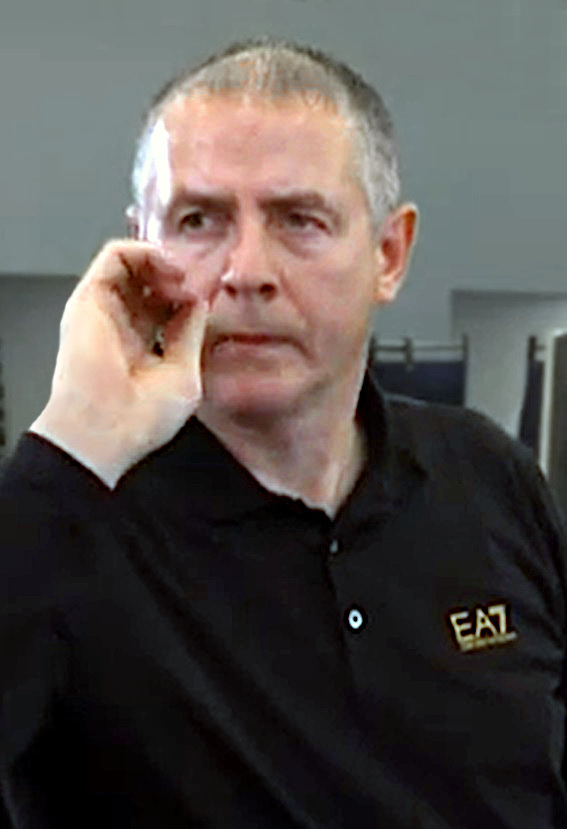
- Barilli in 2021

Personal information
- Born: 14 November 1973 (age 52) Scotland
- Home town: Greenock, Scotland

Sport
- Sport: Darts
- Playing since: 1993
- Darts: 23g Phil Taylor Unicorn
- Laterality: Right-handed
- Walk-on music: "I'm Good (Blue)" by David Guetta and Bebe Rexha

Organisation (see split in darts)
- BDO: 2000–2013
- PDC: 2014–2019 (Tour Card: 2014–2017)
- WDF: 2000–2013, 2020–
- Current world ranking: (WDF) NR (17 August 2026)

WDF major events – best performances
- World Championship: Last 32: 2009, 2010, 2011, 2013, 2023
- World Masters: Last 16: 2005
- Finder Masters: Last 24: 2007, 2008, 2009
- Dutch Open: Runner-up: 2022

PDC premier events – best performances
- UK Open: Last 64: 2012, 2015

Other tournament wins
- Years
| Elgin Open | 2010 |
| PDC Challenge Tour | 2019 |
| Scottish Masters | 2008, 2010 |
| Hungarian Classic | 2021 |

Mark Barilli (born 14 November 1973) is a Scottish darts player who plays in Professional Darts Corporation (PDC) events. He is well known for his throwing style where he changes the speed of his throw from fast to slow alternatively, and also for attempting outrageous outshots including one occasion where he attempted to check out 120 with 3 double 20s in a competitive match.

== Career ==
Barilli reached the last 16 of the 2005 Winmau World Masters, beating Gibraltar's Dylan Duo and Dutchman André Brantjes in the earlier rounds and then beat BDO Gold Cup champion Derek Williams of Wales in the last 32 before losing to Brian Woods. He then made semi final appearances in the Scottish Open and the Scottish National Championship and then reached the final of the British Open, beating Darryl Fitton in the quarter-finals and fellow Scot Gary Anderson in the semi-finals before losing to Mick Reed.

Barilli's first major appearance came in the 2007 International Darts League where he started at the Preliminary stage, losing 5–1 to Jelle Klaasen in his opening group game, but then defeated Robert Hughes 5–0. He then however lost to Robbie Green and was eliminated. He then lost in the first round of the 2007 World Darts Trophy to Vincent van der Voort.

Barilli reached the quarter-final of the Swiss Open and the semi-final of the BDO International Open. He then reached his second final in the unranked Welsh Masters, losing to Tony O'Shea.

Barilli qualified for the 2009 BDO World Darts Championship, taking one of the automatic non-seed places. He was beaten 3–0 in the first round by Australia's Simon Whitlock.

Barilli qualified for the 2010 BDO World Darts Championship seeded 13th, but lost to Tony West in the first round 3–1.

At the 2011 BDO World Darts Championship, Barilli seeded 12th lost 3–0 in the first round to Martin Phillips.

Barilli acquired a PDC tour card at Q School in January 2014.

After a number of years away from the Circuit & after lockdown, Barilli qualified for the 2022 WDF World Darts Championship but lost in the 1st round to Canadian Rory Hansen 2–0.

== World Championship performance ==
=== BDO ===
- 2009: First round (lost to Simon Whitlock 0–3) (sets)
- 2010: First round (lost to Tony West 1–3)
- 2011: First round (lost to Martin Phillips 0–3)
- 2013: First round (lost to Scott Mitchell 2–3)

=== WDF ===
- 2022: First round (lost to Rory Hansen 0–2)
- 2023: Second round (lost to Jim Widmayer 0–3)
- 2024: First round (lost to Shane McGuirk 0–2)
