= Rhian O'Sullivan =

Welsh darts player (born 1981)

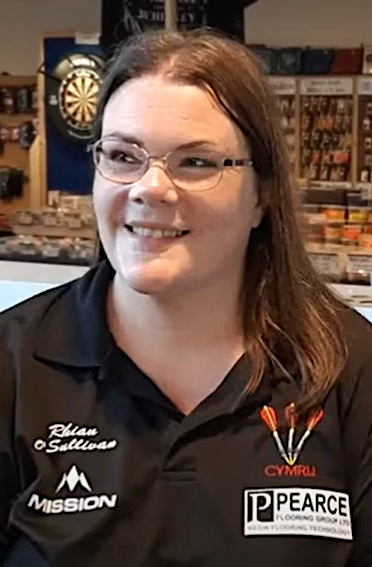
- O'Sullivan in 2022

Personal information
- Nickname: "The Swan"
- Born: 20 January 1981 (age 45) Swansea, Wales
- Home town: Llanelli, Wales

Sport
- Sport: Darts
- Playing since: 1999
- Darts: 23g Mission
- Laterality: Right-handed
- Walk-on music: "Yma o Hyd" by Dafydd Iwan ac Ar Log

Organisation (see split in darts)
- BDO: 2008–2020
- PDC: 2021–present
- WDF: 2008–present
- Current world ranking: (WDF W) 4 (17 August 2026)

WDF major events – best performances
- World Championship: Runner-up: 2010, 2011
- World Masters: Runner-up: 2024
- World Trophy: Last 16: 2018
- Dutch Open: Winner (1): 2025

Other tournament wins
- Years
Denmark Masters	2023
England National Singles	2022
Las Vegas Classic	2025
Swiss Open	2023
Spanish Open	2022
Turkish Open	2010, 2012
PDC Women's Series	2023
Irish Classic	2023
Six Nations Cup	2023, 2024
MODUS Super Series	2024
Medal record
Women's Darts
Representing Wales
WDF Europe Cup
Silver medal – second place	2024 Šamorín	Women's pairs
Bronze medal – third place	2022 Gandía	Women's singles

Rhian O'Sullivan (née Edwards; 20 January 1981) is a Welsh professional darts player who competes in both Professional Darts Corporation (PDC) and World Darts Federation (WDF) events and previously competed in British Darts Organisation (BDO) events. She won her first WDF ranking major title at the 2025 Dutch Open. She is a two-time finalist at the BDO Women's World Championship in 2010 and 2011. She also finished as the runner-up at the 2024 WDF World Masters.

== Darts career ==
O'Sullivan was a quarter finalist in the 2009 Women's World Masters. She qualified for her first BDO Women's World Championship in 2010. She defeated fellow Welshwoman Julie Gore 2–0 in the quarter-finals, and Karen Lawman 2–0 in the semi-finals. In the final, she was beaten 0–2 by Trina Gulliver.

In 2011, she again reached the World Championship final after victories over Gore in the quarter-finals and Deta Hedman in the semi-finals. She was beaten 0–2 by Gulliver for the second final in a row.

In 2012, O'Sullivan was defeated in the first round by top seed and eventual runner-up Hedman. She hit the highest checkout (155) recorded in the history of the women's world finals. The record was beaten in 2014.

In 2023 O'Sullivan qualified for the Women's World Matchplay for the first time. She lost in the quarter-finals 3–4 to Robyn Byrne.

== Personal life ==
O'Sullivan is not a full-time professional darts player, and works as a childcare nursery nurse.

== World Championship results ==
=== BDO/WDF ===
- 2010: Runner-up (lost to Trina Gulliver 0–2) (sets)
- 2011: Runner-up (lost to Trina Gulliver 0–2)
- 2012: First round (lost to Deta Hedman 1–2)
- 2022: Semi-finals (lost to Kirsty Hutchinson 2–3)
- 2023: Semi-finals (lost to Beau Greaves 0–3)
- 2024: Second round (lost to Lerena Rietbergen 0–2)
- 2025: Semi-finals (lost to Lerena Rietbergen 2–3)

== Career finals ==
=== BDO major finals: 3 (0 titles) ===
Legend
World Championship (0–2)
World Masters (0–1)

Outcome	No.	Year	Championship	Opponent in the final	Score
Runner-up	1.	2010	World Championship	(England) Trina Gulliver	0–2 (s)
Runner-up	2.	2011	World Championship	(England) Trina Gulliver	0–2 (s)
Runner-up	3.	2024	World Masters	(England) Beau Greaves	0–6 (l)

== Performance timeline ==
BDO

Tournament	2008	2009	2010	2011	2018
BDO Ranked televised events
World Championship	DNQ		F	F	DNQ
World Masters	1R	QF	1R	DNQ	
BDO World Trophy	NH				1R

WDF

Tournament	2022	2023	2024	2025
WDF Platinum/major events
World Championship	SF	QF	2R	SF
World Masters	DNQ	NH	F	3R
Dutch Open (Note: Last 16 results only.)	F	SF	QF	W

PDC

Tournament	2023	2024	2025	2026
PDC Televised women's events
Women's World Matchplay	QF	QF	DNQ	
