= Richie George =

English darts player

Personal information
- Full name: Richard George
- Nickname: "Richie Rich"
- Born: 18 December 1989 (age 36) Colchester, Essex, England
- Home town: Ardleigh, Essex, England

Sport
- Sport: Darts
- Playing since: 1994
- Darts: 23g Red Dragon Signature
- Laterality: Right-handed
- Walk-on music: "Danza Kuduro" by Lucenzo

Organisation (see split in darts)
- BDO: 2011–2014

WDF major events – best performances
- World Championship: Semi-Final: 2013
- World Masters: Last 32: 2012, 2013
- World Trophy: Last 32: 2014
- Finder Masters: Last 24 Group: 2012, 2013

PDC premier events – best performances
- Grand Slam: Group Stages: 2013, 2014

Other tournament wins
- Years
Colchester Open	2011
England Open Early Bird	2012
Southend Open	2011

Richard George (born 18 December 1989) is an English former professional darts player. He was born in Essex and is the son of former world championship finalist Bobby George. They became the first father-and-son duo to play in the BDO version of the World Championship, when Richie played in the 2013 event.

== Career ==
Richie played darts as a junior, but then left the game. He qualified for the televised stages of the 2012 Winmau World Masters, but lost to Thomas Junghans 3–1 in the last 32.

George qualified for the 2013 BDO World Championship as the 15th seed. He played Dave Prins in the first round, and survived seven match darts en route to a 3-2 win. He then beat Jimmy Hendriks 4-2 in the second round, and recovered from 3-1 down against Jan Dekker to win 5-4 and reach the semi-finals, where he was beaten 6-1 by Scott Waites.

Courtesy of his run at Lakeside, George qualified for the 2013 Grand Slam of Darts, where he was drawn in Group C alongside two-time PDC World Champion Adrian Lewis, former Lakeside winner Christian Kist, and another debutant in the Belgian Ronny Huybrechts. George finished bottom of the group, losing his opening match 5-2 to Lewis, before losing by the same scoreline to Kist to confirm his elimination. George ended his campaign with a 5-3 defeat to group winner Huybrechts.

He has not played competitive darts since the 2014 Grand Slam of Darts, where he also lost all 3 group games. He only won 3 legs in the entire tournament.

== World Championship results ==
=== BDO ===
- 2013: Semi Final (lost to Scott Waites 1-6)
- 2014: First Round (lost to Robbie Green 0-3)
