= Dave Prins =

English darts player

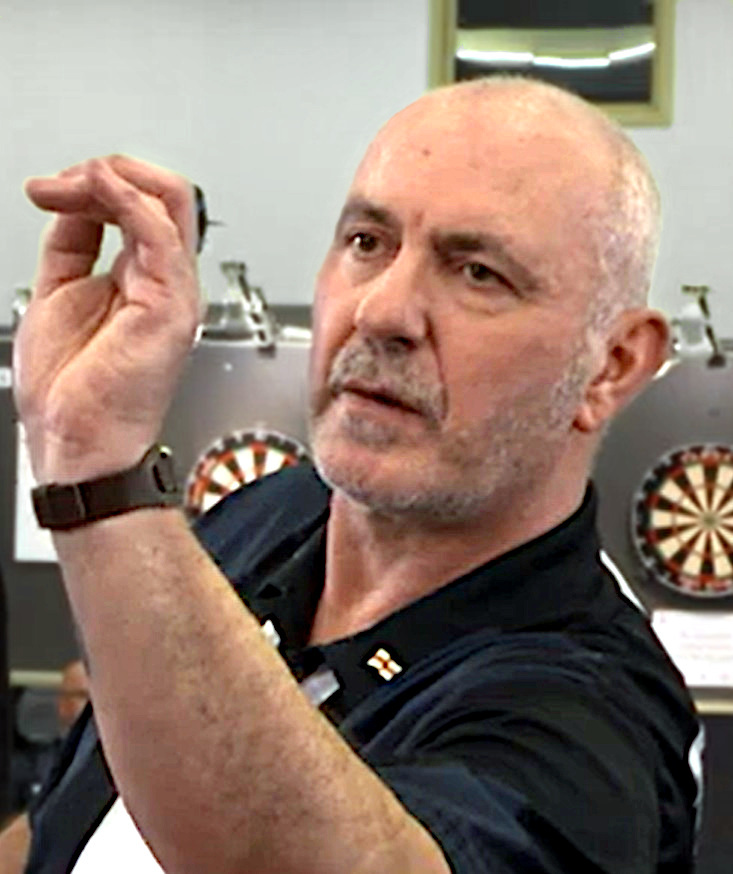
- Prins in 2021

Personal information
- Full name: David Michael Prins
- Nickname: "The Badger"
- Born: 16 November 1968 (age 57) Durham, County Durham, England
- Home town: Peterlee, County Durham, England

Sport
- Sport: Darts
- Playing since: 1988
- Darts: 26g Target
- Laterality: Left-handed
- Walk-on music: "Teenage Kicks" by The Undertones

Organisation (see split in darts)
- BDO: 2005–2018
- PDC: 2018–2020
- WDF: 2021–
- Current world ranking: (WDF) NR (17 August 2026)

WDF major events – best performances
- World Championship: Last 16: 2014
- World Masters: Last 16: 2009, 2012
- Finder Masters: Last 24 Group: 2009, 2010

PDC premier events – best performances
- UK Open: Last 64: 2018

WSDT major events – best performances
- World Championship: Quarter Final: 2022

Other tournament wins
- Years
Czech Open	2008
Fife Open	2011
Isle of Man Open	2010, 2022
Hungarian Open	2011, 2012
Swiss Open	2015

David Michael Prins (born 16 November 1968) is an English professional darts player.

== Career ==
Prins reached the last 16 of the 2009 Winmau World Masters, where he lost to Tony O'Shea in three straight sets.

Prins qualified for his first BDO World Darts Championship in 2010. He was the seventh seed, but lost in the first round to eventual semi-finalist Martin Phillips.

He won the 2010 Isle of Man Open, beating Joey ten Berge. He also qualified for the 2011 BDO World Darts Championship as the number 16 seed, but lost 1–3 to John Walton. After the match, Prins said that he believed he would not be able to compete on the BDO Circuit in 2011 due to work commitments. However, he continued playing and subsequently qualified for the 2012 BDO World Darts Championship, where he again lost in the first round, 3–0 to Willy van de Wiel; this match then became the focus of a match-fixing controversy where it was alleged that Prins had intentionally played poorly, though no evidence was ultimately found and no action was taken.

Prins once again reached the World Championship in 2013, this time missing seven match darts in a 3–2 defeat by Richie George. In 2014, Prins entered the tournament at the newly implemented preliminary round and finally won his first match at the Lakeside, defeating Dutch debutant Jeroen Geerdink 3–0. Prins followed this up with a 3–0 first round victory over Jim Williams to set up a second round clash with world number one Stephen Bunting, which Prins lost 4–0 despite averaging almost 90 while Bunting averaged over 100.

Prins returned to the TV Screens in 2022 qualifying for 2 TV Events, Firstly the inaugural 2022 World Seniors Darts Championship reaching the Quarter-Final beating Paul Lim & John Lowe before losing to Robert Thornton in the last 8. Prins also qualified for the 2022 WDF World Darts Championship Beating Mark Graham in the Last 48 before falling in a Lakeside classic last leg decided to Welshman Michael Warburton.

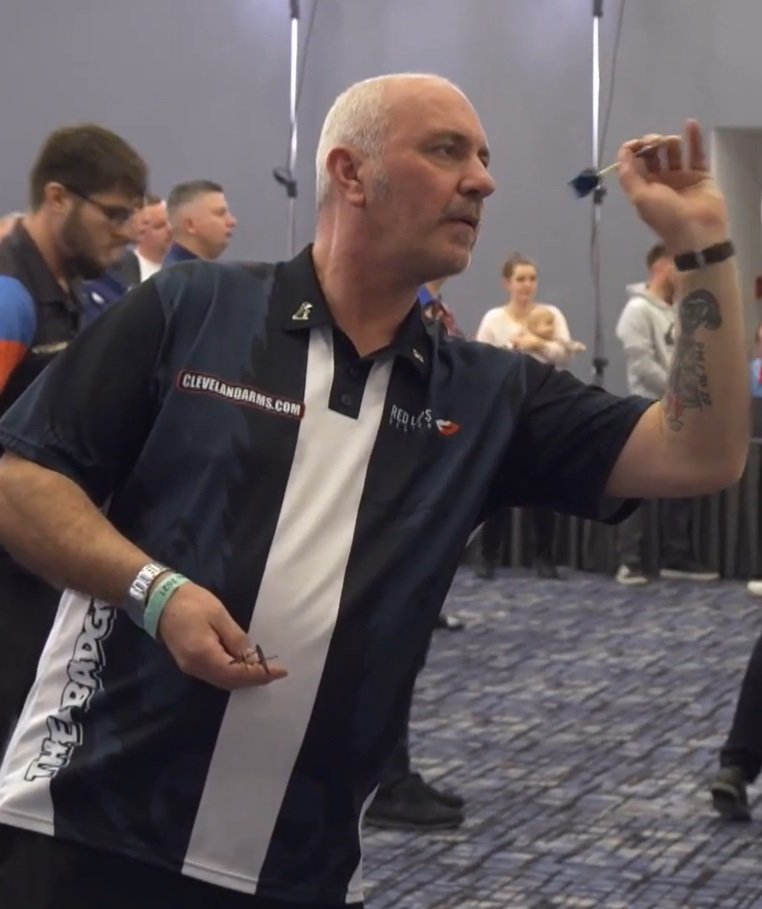
Dave Prins at Czech Open Darts 2021

== World Championship results ==
=== BDO ===
- 2010: First round (lost to Martin Phillips 0–3)
- 2011: First round (lost to John Walton 1–3)
- 2012: First round (lost to Willy van de Wiel 0–3)
- 2013: First round (lost to Richie George 2–3)
- 2014: Second round (lost to Stephen Bunting 0–4)

=== WDF ===
- 2022: Second round (lost to Mike Warburton 2–3)
- 2023: First round (lost to Reece Colley 0–2)

=== WSDT ===
- 2022: Quarter-finals (lost to Robert Thornton 0–3)
- 2023: First round (lost to Martin Adams 1–3)
