= 2010 World Masters (darts) =

Winmau World Masters

Tournament information
- Dates: 29–31 October
- Venue: Hull City Hall
- Location: East Riding of Yorkshire
- Country: England
- Organisation(s): BDO
- Format: Sets
- Prize fund: £66,500
- Winner's share: £25,000 (men's)

The 2010 Winmau World Masters was the fourth major tournament on the BDO/WDF calendar for 2010. It took place from 29 to 31 October in the Hull City Hall, which hosted the event for the first time, taking over from the Bridlington Spa Royal Hall. It was broadcast by the BBC. Martin Adams, who was the defending champion and top seed, successfully defended the tournament by beating Stuart Kellett 7–3 in the final.

== Seeds ==
Men

1. (England) Martin Adams
2. (England) Stuart Kellett
3. (England) Steve West
4. (England) Dean Winstanley
5. (England) Tony O'Shea
6. (England) Garry Thompson
7. (Scotland) Ross Montgomery
8. (England) Scott Waites

Women

1. (England) Deta Hedman
2. (England) Trina Gulliver
3. (Russia) Irina Armstrong
4. (England) Karen Lawman
5. (Wales) Julie Gore
6. (England) Dee Bateman
7. (England) Tricia Wright
8. (Netherlands) Karin Krappen

== Men's Draw ==
Last 24; Best of 5 sets Losers £0
(England) John Walton	2
(Netherlands) Jan Dekker	3
(Netherlands) Jerry Hendriks	3
(England) Darryl Fitton	1
(England) Paul Jennings	1
(Republic of Ireland) Martin McCloskey	3
(Philippines) Ronald L. Briones	1
(Scotland) Stewart Rattray	3
(England) Tony West	3
(England) Gary Robson	2
(Wales) Jamie Lewis	2
(England) Ted Hankey	3
(Wales) Martin Phillips	3
(England) Brian Woods	2
(England) Alan Norris	2
(England) Ian Jones	3

Last 16; Best of 5 sets Losers £1,000
1	(England) Martin Adams 91.53	3
(Netherlands) Jan Dekker 86.94	2
8	(England) Scott Waites 84.48	3
(Netherlands) Jerry Hendriks 78.18	0
5	(England) Tony O'Shea 90.18	2
(Republic of Ireland) Martin McCloskey 89.45	3
4	(England) Dean Winstanley 90.66	3
(Scotland) Stewart Rattray 85.21	1
2	(England) Stuart Kellett 83.79	3
(England) Tony West 83.73	1
7	(Scotland) Ross Montgomery 88.17	2
(England) Ted Hankey 92.10	3
6	(England) Garry Thompson 71.70	0
(Wales) Martin Phillips 76.72	3
3	(England) Steve West 91.86	2
(England) Ian Jones 91.71	3

Quarter-finals; Best of 5 sets Losers £1,500
1	(England) Martin Adams 91.25	3
8	(England) Scott Waites 91.32	1
(Republic of Ireland) Martin McCloskey 85.44	3
4	(England) Dean Winstanley 83.52	0
2	(England) Stuart Kellett 88.23	3
(England) Ted Hankey 84.05	2
(Wales) Martin Phillips 97.82	3
(England) Ian Jones 91.71	1

Semi-finals; Best of 11 sets Losers £3,000
1	(England) Martin Adams 95.01	6
(Republic of Ireland) Martin McCloskey 86.91	3
2	(England) Stuart Kellett 89.34	6
(Wales) Martin Phillips 91.04	5

Final; Best of 13 sets Winner £25,000; Runner up £10,000
1	(England) Martin Adams 98.34	7
2	(England) Stuart Kellett 91.00	3

== Ladies Draw ==
First round Best of 7 legs
(England) Deta Hedman	2
(England) Apylee Jones	4
8	(Netherlands) Karin Krappen	4
(Australia) Carol Forwood	0
(Wales) Julie Gore	4
(United States) Brenda Roush	2
(Wales) Rhian Edwards	3
4	(England) Karen Lawmen	4
3	(Russia) Irina Armstrong	3
(Northern Ireland) Denise Cassidy	4
(Netherlands) Francis Hoenselaar	4
(Scotland) Olive Byamukama	0
(Netherlands) Tamara Schuur	4
(England) Nicola Furse	0
(England) Lisa Ashton	4
2	(England) Trina Gulliver	3

Quarter-finals; Best of 7 legs
(England) Apylee Jones	2
8	(Netherlands) Karin Krappen	4
5	(Wales) Julie Gore	4
4	(England) Karen Lawman	3
(Northern Ireland) Denise Cassidy	2
(Netherlands) Francis Hoenselaar	4
(Netherlands) Tamara Schuur	2
(England) Lisa Ashton	4

Semi-finals; Best of 7 legs
8	(Netherlands) Karin Krappen 74.19	3
5	(Wales) Julie Gore 68.73	4
(Netherlands) Francis Hoenselaar 78.27	4
(England) Lisa Ashton 77.79	3

Final; Best of 7 legs
5	(Wales) Julie Gore 70.41	4
(Netherlands) Francis Hoenselaar 74.46	1
