= 2009 World Masters (darts) =

Winmau World Masters

Tournament information
- Dates: 4–6 September 2009
- Venue: Bridlington Spa Royal Hall
- Location: East Riding of Yorkshire, England
- Country: England
- Organisation(s): BDO
- Format: Sets (best of 3 legs) for men, Legs for women, boys and girls Finals: best of 13 (men's)
- Prize fund: £53,000
- Winner's share: £25,000 (men's)

Champion(s)
- (England) Martin Adams (men) (England) Linda Ithurralde (women) (Wales) Jamie Lewis (boys) (England) Zoe Jones (girls)

The 2009 Winmau World Masters was the fourth major tournament on the BDO/WDF calendar for 2009. It took place from September 4–6 in the Bridlington Spa Royal Hall. It was shown on the BBC. The men's final was won by Martin Adams, who beat Robbie Green by 7 sets to 6. The women's final was won by Linda Ithurralde, who beat Trina Gulliver by 4 legs to 3.

== Seeds ==
Men

1. (England) Tony O'Shea
2. (England) Scott Waites
3. (England) Darryl Fitton
4. (England) Ted Hankey
5. (England) Martin Adams
6. (Scotland) Ross Montgomery
7. (England) Steve West
8. (Netherlands) Joey ten Berge

Women

1. (England) Trina Gulliver
2. (Russia) Irina Armstrong
3. (Wales) Julie Gore
4. (England) Tricia Wright
5. (Netherlands) Francis Hoenselaar
6. (England) Dee Bateman
7. (Netherlands) Karin Krappen
8. (England) Lisa Ashton

== Men's Draw ==
From the Last 24

Last 24; Best of 5 Losers £0
(England) Dave Prins	3
(England) Gary Robson	2
(England) Steve Douglas	3
(Netherlands) Jermaine Wattimena	0
(Sweden) Magnus Caris	3
(England) Stephen Bunting	1
(Netherlands) Gino Vos	3
(England) Martin Atkins	1
(Philippines) Lourence Ilagan	3
(Scotland) Craig Baxter	1
(Belgium) Kim Huybrechts	3
(England) Paul Brooks	2
(England) Robbie Green	3
(Northern Ireland) Daryl Gurney	1
(Republic of Ireland) Connie Finnan	3
(Denmark) Vladimir Andersen	1

Last 16; Best of 5 Losers £750
1	(England) Tony O'Shea (90.06)	3
(England) Dave Prins (86.64)	0
8	(Netherlands) Joey ten Berge (83.91)	3
(England) Steve Douglas (81.03)	2
5	(England) Martin Adams (91.26)	3
(Sweden) Magnus Caris (90.99)	1
4	(England) Ted Hankey (86.76)	1
(Netherlands) Gino Vos (87.06)	3
2	(England) Scott Waites (86.07)	2
(Philippines) Lourence Ilagan (88.77)	3
7	(England) Steve West (92.76)	3
(Belgium) Kim Huybrechts (88.86)	1
6	(Scotland) Ross Montgomery (88.98)	1
(England) Robbie Green (93.12)	3
3	(England) Darryl Fitton (83.70)	1
(Republic of Ireland) Connie Finnan (90.96)	3

Quarter-finals; Best of 5 Losers £1,500
1	(England) Tony O'Shea (89.73)	3
8	(Netherlands) Joey ten Berge (80.94)	0
5	(England) Martin Adams (92.34)	3
(Netherlands) Gino Vos (87.12)	1
(Philippines) Lourence Ilagan (89.37)	3
7	(England) Steve West (85.47)	2
(England) Robbie Green (89.28)	3
(Republic of Ireland) Connie Finnan (81.12)	0

Semi-finals; Best of 11; Losers £3,000
1	(England) Tony O'Shea (86.52)	2
5	(England) Martin Adams (94.98)	6
(Philippines) Lourence Ilagan (90.54)	3
(England) Robbie Green (92.64)	6

Final; Best of 13; Winner £25,000; Runner up £10,000
5	(England) Martin Adams (90.15)	7
(England) Robbie Green (86.09)	6

Scores after player's names are three-dart averages (total points scored divided by darts thrown and multiplied by 3)

== Ladies Draw ==
First round Best of 7 legs Losers £0
1	(England) Trina Gulliver	4
(Northern Ireland) Denise Cassidy	1
8	(England) Lisa Ashton	4
(Belgium) Nicolle Deille	2
5	(Netherlands) Francis Hoenselaar	4
(Germany) Monique Leßmeister	0
4	(England) Tricia Wright	2
(Wales) Rhian Edwards	4
(England) Karen Lawman	3
6	(England) Dee Bateman	4
(Scotland) Anne Kirk	4
(Denmark) Anette Sand Andersen	2
(Netherlands) Tamara Schuur	3
(England) Linda Ithurralde	4
7	(Netherlands) Karin Krappen	4
(Japan) Ayumi Okubo	1

Quarter-finals; Best of 7 legs Losers £500
1	(England) Trina Gulliver	4
8	(England) Lisa Ashton	2
5	(Netherlands) Francis Hoenselaar	4
(Wales) Rhian Edwards	3
6	(England) Dee Bateman	4
(Scotland) Anne Kirk	0
(England) Linda Ithurralde	4
7	(Netherlands) Karin Krappen	0

Semi-finals; Best of 7 legs Losers £750
1	(England) Trina Gulliver (72.42)	4
5	(Netherlands) Francis Hoenselaar (62.62)	0
6	(England) Dee Bateman (66.24)	3
(England) Linda Ithurralde (68.82)	4

Final; Best of 7 legs Winner £5,000; Runner up £2,000
1	(England) Trina Gulliver (67.83)	3
(England) Linda Ithurralde (68.10)	4
