= 2016 in darts =

This article documents all major events in the sport of darts over the course of 2016.

== BDO ==
January

- January 2 – 10: 2016 BDO World Darts Championship in (England) Frimley Green
  - Men's winner: (England) Scott Waites
  - Women's winner: (England) Trina Gulliver
  - Youth winner: (England) Joshua Richardson
- January 17: Quebec Open in Drummondville
  - Men's winner: (Canada) Dawson Murschell
  - Women's winner: (Canada) Cindy Hayhurst
- January 22 – 24: Romanian Darts Festival in (Romania) Bucharest
  - Men's Classic winner: (England) Jamie Hughes
  - Women's Classic winner: (Sweden) Anette Tillbom
  - Men's Open winner: (Netherlands) Fabian Roosenbrand
  - Women's Open winner: (England) Rachel Brooks
- January 22 – 24: Las Vegas Open in (Nevada) Las Vegas
  - Men's winner: (United States) Benjamin Dersch
  - Women's winner: (United States) Paula Murphy
- January 29 – 31: Dutch Open in (Netherlands) Assen
  - Men's winner: (England) Martin Adams
  - Women's winner: (England) Lisa Ashton

February

- February 7: Canterbury Classic in New Zealand
  - Men's winner: (New Zealand) Cody Harris
  - Women's winner: (New Zealand) Tina Osborne
- February 12 – 14: Scottish Open in (Scotland) Renfrew
  - Men's winner: (Netherlands) Danny Noppert
  - Women's winner: (England) Lorraine Winstanley
- February 20: Syracuse Open in (New York (state)) Syracuse
  - Men's winner: (United States) Jim Widmayer
  - Women's winner: (United States) Paula Murphy

March

- March 4 – 6: Halifax Open in Canada
  - Men's winner: (New Brunswick) Jeff Smith
  - Women's winner: (Newfoundland and Labrador) Patricia Farrell
- March 10 – 13: Isle of Man Classic and Open in
  - Men's Classic winner: (England) Scott Mitchell
  - Women's Classic winner: (England) Deta Hedman
  - Men's Open winner: (England) Tony O'Shea
  - Women's Open winner: (England) Lisa Ashton
- March 11 – 13: Greater Vancouver Open in Canada
  - Men's winner: (Canada) Shawn Burt
  - Women's winner: (Canada) Kim Bellay-Rouselle
- March 12 – 13: 2016 Iceland Open in Iceland
  - Men's winner: (Sweden) Göran Eriksson
  - Women's winner: (Denmark) Elin Mortensen
- March 12 – 13: West Coast Classic in Australia
  - Men's winner: (New Zealand) Koha Kokiri
  - Women's winner: (Australia) Kim Kelly
  - Boys' winner: (Australia) Bobby Mckeig
  - Girls' winner: (Australia) Erin Dawson
- March 13 – Torremolinos Festival of Darts in (Spain) Torremolinos
  - Men's winner: (Northern Ireland) Gary Tipping
  - Women's winner: (England) Paula Jacklin
- March 18 – 20: Saint John Port City Open Dart Shoot in (New Brunswick) Saint John
  - Men's winner: (Canada) David Cameron
  - Women's winner: (Canada) Patricia Farrell
- March 19: HAL Masters in (Netherlands) Venray
  - Men's winner: (Belgium) Geert De Vos
  - Women's winner: (England) Lisa Ashton
  - Boys' winner: (Netherlands) Justin van Tergouw
  - Girls' winner: (Netherlands) Kyana Frauenfelder
- March 20: Hal Open in (Netherlands) Venray
  - Men's winner: (Netherlands) Wesley Harms
  - Women's winner: (England) Lisa Ashton
  - Boys' winner: (Netherlands) Maikel Verberk
  - Girls' winner: (Netherlands) Kyana Frauenfelder
- March 26: South Island Masters in New Zealand
  - Winner: (New Zealand) Warren Parry
- March 26 – 27: Victorian Easter Open in Australia
  - Men's winner: (Australia) Harley Kemp
  - Women's winner: (Australia) Natalie Carter
  - Boys' winner: (Australia) Colby Dodge
  - Girls' winner: (Australia) Kassandra Lee
- March 26: Napoleon Games Top Of Waregem in Belgium
  - Men's winner: (Latvia) Madars Razma
  - Women's winner: (Russia) Anastasia Dobromyslova
  - Boys' winner: (Netherlands) Levy Frauenfelder
  - Girls' winner: (Belgium) Tamara Van der Meirsch
- March 27: Napoleon Games Masters Of Waregem in Belgium
  - Men's winner: (Netherlands) Danny Noppert
  - Women's winner: (England) Deta Hedman
  - Boys' winner: (Netherlands) Justin van Tergouw
  - Girls' winner: (Netherlands) Kyana Frauenfelder

April

- April 1 – 3: The Main Event in (Saskatchewan) Saskatoon
  - Men's winner: (Nova Scotia) David Cameron
  - Women's winner: (Ontario) Roxanne VanTassel
- April 2: Virginia Beach Dart Classic in Virginia Beach
  - Men's winner: (United States) Darin Young
  - Women's winner: (United States) Paula Murphy
- April 2: White Mountain Shootout in (New Hampshire) Shelburne
  - Men's winner: (United States) Tom Sawyer
  - Women's winner: (United States) Pam Briggs
- April 8 – 10: Charlotte Open in (North Carolina) Charlotte
  - Men's winner: (United States) Joe Chaney
  - Women's winner: (United States) Sandy Hudson
- April 16: Bull's German Open in Germany
  - Men's Singles winner: (Netherlands) Danny Noppert
  - Women's Singles winner: (Netherlands) Aileen de Graaf
  - Boys' winner: (Netherlands) Justin van Tergouw
  - Girls' winner: (Germany) Christina Schuler
- April 17: Bull's Darts Masters in Germany
  - Men's Singles winner: (Netherlands) Wesley Harms
  - Women's Singles winner: (Netherlands) Aileen de Graaf
- April 22 – 24: Murray Bridge Grand Prix in (Australia) Adelaide
  - Men's winner: (Australia) Peter Machin
  - Women's winner: (Australia) Corrine Hammond
  - Boys' winner: (Australia) Zaine Skelton
  - Girls' winner: (Australia) Elleesha Jarrett
- April 24: North Island Masters in New Zealand
  - Men's winner: (New Zealand) Craig Caldwell
  - Women's winner: (New Zealand) Sha Hohipa
- April 29 – May 1: Estonia Open in Estonia
  - Men's winner: (Sweden) Peter Sajwani
  - Women's winner: (Finland) Kaisu Rekinen
- April 30: 2016 Denmark Open darts in Denmark
  - Men's winner: (Lithuania) Darius Labanauskas
  - Women's winner: (England) Deta Hedman

May

- May 1: Denmark Masters in Denmark
  - Men's winner: (England) Glen Durrant
  - Women's winner: (England) Deta Hedman
  - Boys' winner: (Netherlands) Wessel Nijman
  - Girls' winner: (Denmark) Iselin Hauen
- May 6 – 8: Newfoundland & Labrador Spring Open in (Newfoundland and Labrador) St. John's
  - Men's winner: (Nova Scotia) David Cameron
  - Women's winner: (Canada) Patricia Farrell
- May 12 – 15: Welsh Open in (Wales) Prestatyn
  - Men's winner: (Scotland) Cameron Menzies
  - Women's winner: (England) Lindsey Ashton
- May 14: Lithuania Open in Lithuania
  - Men's winner: (Lithuania) Darius Labanauskas
  - Women's winner: (Finland) Maret Liiri
- May 21: Polish Open in Poland
  - Men's winner: (Northern Ireland) Darren Clifford
  - Women's winner: (England) Deta Hedman
  - Boys' winner: (Netherlands) Gijsbert van Malsem
  - Girls' winner: (Netherlands) Veerle Hamelink
- May 21 & 22: Sunshine State Classic in (Australia) Brisbane
  - Men's winner: (Australia) Raymond Smith
  - Women's winner: (Australia) Corrine Hammond
  - Youth winner: (Australia) Fletcher Blair
- May 22: Police Masters in Poland
  - Men's winner: (England) James Hurrell
  - Women's winner: (England) Deta Hedman
  - Boys' winner: (Poland) Dennis Wunsch
  - Girls' winner: (Denmark) Leni Nielsen
- May 28: Finnish Open in Finland
  - Men's winner: (Sweden) Tony Alanentalo
  - Women's winner: (Sweden) Vicky Pruim
  - Youth winner: (Finland) Otto Kekäläinen
- May 28 – 30: 2016 BDO World Trophy in (England) Frimley Green
  - Men's winner: (England) Darryl Fitton
  - Women's winner: (England) Lisa Ashton
- May 29: Finnish Masters in Finland
  - Men's winner: (Sweden) Dennis Nilsson
  - Women's winner: (Sweden) Vicky Pruim

June

- June 3 – 5: Swiss Open in (Switzerland) Lausen
  - Men's winner: (Netherlands) Jeffrey Sparidaans
  - Women's winner: (England) Deta Hedman
  - Youth winner: (Austria) Rusty-Jake Rodriguez
- June 3 – 6: BDO International Open in (England) Somerset
  - Men's winner: (Wales) Nick Kenny
  - Women's winner: (England) Lisa Ashton
  - Youth winner: (England) Owen Maiden
- June 5: Canterbury Open in New Zealand
  - Men's winner: (New Zealand) Greg Moss
  - Women's winner: (New Zealand) Sha Hohipa
- June 17 – 18: Canadian Open in (British Columbia) Richmond
  - Men's winner: (Canada) Kiley Edmunds
  - Women's winner: (Canada) Karrah Boutilier
- June 17 – 19: England National Singles in Selsey
  - Men's winner: (England) Gary Robson
  - Women's winner: (England) Deta Hedman
- June 18: Puma NZ Masters in New Zealand
  - Men's winner: (New Zealand) Mark McGrath
  - Women's winner: (New Zealand) Tina Osborne
- June 18 & 19: England Open in Selsey
  - Men's winner: (England) Glen Durrant
  - Women's winner: (England) Deta Hedman
- June 25 – 26: Central Coast Classic (New South Wales) Gosford
  - Men's winner: (Australia) Raymond Lane
  - Women's winner: (Australia) Corrine Hammond
- June 25 – 26: Austrian Open Vienna in Austria
  - Men's winner: (Germany) Robert Allenstein
  - Women's winner: (Hungary) Veronika Ihász
  - Boys' winner: (Austria) Rusty-Jake Rodriguez
  - Girls' winner: (Hungary) Boglarka Bokor

July

- July 1 – 3: Australian Grand Masters in (Australia) Canberra
  - Men's winner: (Australia) Corey Cadby
  - Women's winner: (Australia) Corrine Hammond
- July 10: Japan Open Tokyo
  - Men's winner: (Japan) Seigo Asada
  - Women's winner: (England) Fallon Sherrock
- July 30: BDO Shownights Winmau European Darts Classic in (England) Blackpool
  - Men's winner: (England) Scott Waites
  - Women's winner: (Russia) Anastasia Dobromyslova
- July 30: Pacific Masters in (Victoria (state)) Bendigo
- July 31: 2016 European Darts Open in (England) Blackpool
  - Men's winner: (England) Glen Durrant
  - Women's winner: (England) Lisa Ashton
  - Youth winner: (England) Jordan Singh

August

- August 5 – 7: Belgium Open in Belgium
  - Men's winner: (Scotland) Ross Montgomery
  - Women's winner: (Netherlands) Aileen de Graaf
  - Youth winner: (Netherlands) Justin van Tergouw
  - Girl's winner: (Netherlands) Layla Brussel
- August 6: USA Darts Classic in (Connecticut) Stamford
  - Men's winner: (United States) Tom Sawyer
  - Women's winner: (United States) Paula Murphy
  - Youth winner: (United States) Tyler Burnett
  - Girl's winner: (United States) Kaylee Roy
- August 10: New Zealand Open in Rotorua
  - Men's winner: (New Zealand) Cody Harris
  - Women's winner: (New Zealand) Tina Osborne
- August 12 – 14: Antwerp Open in (Belgium) Antwerp
  - Men's winner: (Netherlands) Jimmy Hendriks
  - Women's winner: (England) Lisa Ashton
  - Youth winner: (Netherlands) Justin van Tergouw
  - Girl's winner: (Netherlands) Kyana Frauenfelder
- August 19: LDO Swedish Classic in (Sweden) Malmö
  - Winner: (Netherlands) Aileen de Graaf
- August 20: Swedish Open in (Sweden) Malmö
  - Men's winner: (England) Glen Durrant
  - Women's winner: (England) Lisa Ashton
- August 20 & 21: Hong Kong Open in Hong Kong
  - Men's winner: (Philippines) Paolo Nebrida
  - Women's winner: (Japan) Inoue Sayaka
- August 20 & 21: Van Diemen Classic Grand Prix in (Tasmania) Westbury
  - Men's winner: (Australia) Michael Pearce
  - Women's winner: (Australia) Sandra Smith
- August 26 – 28: French Open in France
  - Men's winner: (Belgium) Geert De Vos
  - Women's winner: (England) Deta Hedman
  - Youth winner: (Netherlands) Dylan Van Beers
- August 27: LDO Ladies Classic in (England) Gainsborough
  - Winner: (England) Lisa Ashton

September

- September 2 – 4: Music City Classic in (Tennessee) Nashville
- September 9 – 11: England Classic in Selsey
  - Men's winner: (Wales) Dean Reynolds
  - Women's winner: (England) Deta Hedman
- September 9 – 11: England Masters in Selsey
  - Men's winner: (England) Glen Durrant
  - Women's winner: (England) Deta Hedman
  - Youth winner: (Scotland) Tyler Radlett
  - Girl's winner: (England) Nicolle Bidgway
- September 11: Catalonia Open Darts in Calella
  - Men's winner: (Catalonia) Martín Martí
  - Women's winner: (Netherlands) Sharon Prins
- September 17: BDO British Classic in (England) Bridlington
  - Men's winner: (England) Glen Durrant
  - Women's winner: (England) Claire Brookin
- September 17: 2016 Auckland Open in New Zealand
  - Men's winner: (New Zealand) Mark Cleaver
  - Women's winner: (New Zealand) Jo Steed
- September 17 & 18: Baltic Cup Open in Lithuania
  - Men's winner: (Sweden) Dennis Nilsson
  - Women's winner: (Norway) Ramona Eriksen
- September 18: BDO British Open in (England) Bridlington
  - Men's winner: (Scotland) Cameron Menzies
  - Women's winner: (England) Deta Hedman
- September 24 & 25: North Queensland Classic in Australia
  - Men's winner: (Australia) Raymond Smith
  - Women's winner: (Australia) Corrine Hammond
- September 25: Dutch Open in (Netherlands) Egmond aan Zee
  - Men's winner: (England) Martin Adams
  - Women's winner: (England) Lisa Ashton

October

- October 7 – 9: Luxembourg Open in Luxembourg
  - Men's winner: (England) Darryl Fitton
  - Women's winner: (England) Deta Hedman
  - Youth winner: (Netherlands) Marvin Van Velzen
  - Women's Youth winner: (Netherlands) Layla Brussel
- October 14 – 16: Latvia Open in Riga
  - Men's winner: (Latvia) Madars Razma
  - Women's winner: (Finland) Kaisu Rekinen
  - Youth winner: (Latvia) Rihards Slisans
- October 14 – 16: Northern Ireland Open in Newry
  - Men's winner: (Republic of Ireland) Keith Rooney
  - Women's winner: (England) Deta Hedman
  - Youth winner: (Republic of Ireland) Keane Barry
- October 15: Colorado Open in Denver
  - Men's winner: (United States) Joe Chaney
  - Women's winner: (United States) Stacey Pace
  - Youth winner: (United States) Tyler Burnett
- October 15 & 16: Australian Grand Masters in (Australia) Geelong
  - Men's winner: (Australia) John Weber
  - Women's winner: (Australia) Corrine Hammond
  - Boy's winner: (Australia) Matt Evans
  - Girl's winner: (Australia) Prosperity Nicholson
- October 19 – 26: Turkish Open in (Turkey) Kemer
  - Masters winners: (Turkey) Umit Uygunsozlu (m) / (Netherlands) Aileen de Graaf (f)
  - Open winners: (Wales) Martin Phillips (m) / (Netherlands) Aileen de Graaf (f)
- October 21 – 23: Witch City Open in (New Hampshire) Nashua
- October 22: Alan King Memorial in (New Zealand) Dunedin
  - Winner: (New Zealand) Mark McGrath
- October 22: EDO London Ladies Classic in (England) London
  - Winner: (Russia) Anastasia Dobromyslova
- October 23: EDO London Ladies Open in (England) London
  - Winner: (Russia) Anastasia Dobromyslova

November

- November 4 – 6: Chris Hatter Memorial in Canada
  - Winners: (United States) Jim Edwards (m) / (Canada) Ivy Wieshlow (f)
- November 5 & 6: Hungarian Open in (Hungary) Budapest
  - Open winners: (Poland) Krzysztof Ratajski (m) / (England) Deta Hedman (f)
  - Youth winners: (Austria) Rusty-Jake Rodriguez / (Hungary) Vivien Czipó (f)
  - Masters winners: (Austria) Rusty-Jake Rodriguez / (England) Deta Hedman (f)
- November 10 – 13: Jersey Festival of darts in Jersey
- November 12: Seacoast Open in (Massachusetts) Andover
  - Winners: (Canada) David Cameron (m) / (Canada) Trish Grzesik (f)
- November 12: Ted Clements Memorial in (New Zealand) Levin
  - Winners: (New Zealand) Cody Harris (m) / (New Zealand) Sha Hohipa (f)
- November 15 – 17: 2016 Malta Open darts in Buġibba
  - Winners: (England) Paul Williams (m) / (England) Christine Readhead (f)
- November 18 – 20: Czech Open in (Czech Republic) Prague
  - Winners: (Belgium) Andy Baetens (m) / (Russia) Anastasia Dobromyslova (f)
  - Youth winners: (Czech Republic) Romn Benecky (m) / (Hungary) Vivien Czipó (f)
- November 30 – December 4: World Masters (TBD)

December

- December 4: Darts Golden Nugget in Australia
- December 9 – 11: Zuiderduin Masters

== PDC ==
- December 17, 2015 – January 3, 2016: 2016 PDC World Darts Championship in (England) London
  - Winner: (Scotland) Gary Anderson
- January 30 & 31: 2016 Masters in (England) Milton Keynes
  - Winner: (Netherlands) Michael van Gerwen
- February 12 – 14: 2016 Dutch Darts Masters in (Netherlands) Venray
  - Winner: (Netherlands) Michael van Gerwen
- March 4 – 6: 2016 UK Open in (England) Minehead
  - Winner: (Netherlands) Michael van Gerwen
- March 26 – 28: 2016 German Darts Masters in (Germany) Munich
  - Winner: (Netherlands) Michael van Gerwen
- May 6 – 8: 2016 Gibraltar Darts Trophy in Gibraltar
  - Winner: (Netherlands) Michael van Gerwen
- May 13 – 15: 2016 European Darts Matchplay in (Germany) Hamburg
  - Winner: (England) James Wade
- May 26 & 27: 2016 Dubai Duty Free Darts Masters in (United Arab Emirates) Dubai
  - Winner: (Scotland) Gary Anderson
- June 2 – 5: 2016 PDC World Cup of Darts in (Germany) Frankfurt
  - Winners: England
- June 10 – 12: 2016 Austrian Darts Open in (Austria) Vienna
  - Winner: (England) Phil Taylor
- June 17 – 19: 2016 Auckland Darts Masters in (New Zealand) Auckland
  - Winner: (Scotland) Gary Anderson
- June 25 & 26: 2016 Shanghai Darts Masters in (China) Shanghai
  - Winner: (Netherlands) Michael van Gerwen
- July 6 & 7: 2016 Tokyo Darts Masters in (Japan) Tokyo
  - Winner: (Scotland) Gary Anderson
- July 16 – 24: 2016 World Matchplay in (England) Blackpool
  - Winner: (Netherlands) Michael van Gerwen
- July 21 – 29: 2016 European Darts Open in (Germany) Düsseldorf
  - Winner: (England) Glen Durrant
- August 18 – 20: 2016 Sydney Darts Masters in (Australia) Sydney
  - Winner: (England) Phil Taylor
- August 25 – 27: 2016 Perth Darts Masters in (Australia) Perth
  - Winner: (Netherlands) Michael van Gerwen
- September 2 – 4: 2016 International Darts Open in (Germany) Riesa
  - Winner: (Austria) Mensur Suljović
- September 9 – 11: 2016 European Darts Trophy in (Germany) Mülheim
  - Winner: (Netherlands) Michael van Gerwen
- September 16 – 18: 2016 European Darts Grand Prix in (Germany) Sindelfingen
  - Winner: (Netherlands) Michael van Gerwen
- September 24 & 25: 2016 Champions League of Darts in (Wales) Cardiff
  - Winner: (England) Phil Taylor
- October 2 – 8: 2016 World Grand Prix in (Republic of Ireland) Dublin
  - Winner: (Netherlands) Michael van Gerwen
- October 14 – 16: 2016 German Darts Championship in (Germany) Hildesheim
  - Winner: (England) Alan Norris
- October 28 – 30: 2016 European Championship in (Belgium) Hasselt
  - Winner: (Netherlands) Michael van Gerwen
- November 5 & 6: 2016 World Series of Darts Finals in (Scotland) Glasgow
  - Winner: (Netherlands) Michael van Gerwen
- November 12 – 20: 2016 Grand Slam of Darts in (England) Wolverhampton
  - Winner: (Netherlands) Michael van Gerwen
- November 25 – 27: 2016 Players Championship Finals in (England) Minehead
- October 16 – November 27: 2016 PDC World Youth Championship in (England) Minehead
