= Turkish Open =

Tournament information
- Venue: Limak Limra Hotel (changes annually)
- Location: Antalya (changes annually)
- Country: Turkey
- Established: 2007
- Organisation(s): TBBDF/BDO, category A /WDF category 3
- Format: Legs
- Prize fund: €11500

Current champion(s)
- (England) Dave Prins (men's) (England) Beau Greaves (women's) (England) Luke Littler (boy's)

The Turkish Open is a darts tournament that has been held since 2007.

== List of winners ==
=== Men's ===
| Year | Champion | Score | Runner-up | Total Prize Money | Champion | Runner-up |
|---|---|---|---|---|---|---|
| 2007 | (Wales) Martin Phillips | 3–2 | (England) Darryl Fitton | | | |
| 2008 | (England) Darryl Fitton | 5–1 | (Wales) Mark Lewis | | | |
| 2009 | (England) Tony O'Shea | 6–2 | (England) Dean Winstanley | £4,200 | £2,000 | £800 |
| 2010 | (England) Scott Waites | 6–1 | (England) Paul Williams | €4,620 | €2,200 | €880 |
| 2011 | (Finland) Ulf Ceder | 6–5 | (England) Scott Waites | £4,200 | £2,000 | £800 |
| 2012 | (Wales) Martin Phillips | 5–2 | (England) Darryl Fitton | £4,200 | £2,000 | £800 |
| 2013 | (Wales) Martin Phillips | 5–0 | (England) Ryan Joyce | £4,200 | £2,000 | £800 |
| 2014 | (Netherlands) Willem Mandigers | 6–4 | (Wales) Martin Phillips | £7,000 | £3,000 | £1,400 |
| 2015 | (Wales) Jim Williams | 6–5 | (Wales) Martin Phillips | €9,000 | €4,000 | €1,850 |
| 2016 | (Wales) Martin Phillips | 6–5 | (England) Jamie Hughes | €9,000 | €7,000 | €2,500 |
| 2017 | (England) Tony O'Shea | 6–4 | (Netherlands) Jeffrey Sparidaans | €8,100 | €2,700 | €1,350 |
| 2018 | (England) Mark McGeeney | 6–2 | (Netherlands) Wesley Harms | €8,100 | €2,700 | €1,350 |
| 2019 | (England) Simon Stainton | 6–5 | (Wales) Wayne Warren | €8,100 | €2,700 | €1,350 |
| 2021 | (England) Dave Prins | 6-5 | (United States) Jules van Dongen | €8,100 | €2,700 | €1,350 |

=== Women's ===
| Year | Champion | Score | Runner-up | Total Prize Money | Champion | Runner-up |
|---|---|---|---|---|---|---|
| 2007 | (England) Dee Bateman | 3-1 | (England) Karen Lawman | | | |
| 2008 | (Wales) Julie Gore | 3–1 | (England) Dee Bateman | | | |
| 2009 | (England) Deta Hedman | def. | (England) Karen Lawman | | | |
| 2010 | (Wales) Rhian O'Sullivan | 5–4 | (England) Karen Lawman | | | |
| 2011 | (England) Karen Lawman | 5–2 | (England) Josie Paterson | | | |
| 2012 | (Wales) Rhian O'Sullivan | 5–3 | (Norway) Rachna David | | | |
| 2013 | (England) Rachel Brooks | def. | (Wales) Gaynor Williams | | | |
| 2014 | (England) Zoe Jones | 5–3 | (England) Rachel Brooks | | | |
| 2015 | (England) Deta Hedman | 5–3 | (Australia) Natalie Carter | | | |
| 2016 | (Netherlands) Aileen de Graaf | 5–1 | (England) Sue Edwards | | | |
| 2017 | (Netherlands) Aileen de Graaf | 5–2 | (England) Laura Turner | | | |
| 2018 | (England) Lisa Ashton | 5–3 | (Netherlands) Aileen de Graaf | €3,400 | €1,200 | €550 |
| 2019 | (England) Lisa Ashton | 5-4 | (England) Fallon Sherrock | €3,400 | €1,200 | €550 |
| 2021 | (England) Beau Greaves | 5-2 | (England) Jo Clements | €3,400 | €1,200 | €550 |

=== Boys ===
| Year | Champions | Score | Runner-up | Prize money | Champions | Runner-up |
|---|---|---|---|---|---|---|
| 2019 | (England) James Beeton | 4–1 | (Netherlands) Daan Bastiaansen | ? | ? | ? |

== Tournament records ==
- Most wins 3: (Wales) Martin Phillips.
- Most Finals 5: (Wales) Martin Phillips.
- Most Semi Finals 5: (Wales) Martin Phillips.
- Most Quarter Finals 5: (Wales) Martin Phillips.
- Most Appearances 8: (Wales) Martin Phillips.
- Most Prize Money won £6,933: (Wales) Martin Phillips.
- Best winning average (100.20) : (Wales) Martin Phillips v (Netherlands) Danny Noppert, 2015, Semi Final.
- Youngest Winner age 25: (Netherlands) Willem Mandigers.
- Oldest Winner age 55: (Wales) Martin Phillips.
- Worst Odds Winner age 45: Michael Gore
