= 2015 BDO World Trophy =

Winmau BDO World Trophy

Tournament information
- Dates: 26 February – 1 March 2015
- Venue: Event City
- Location: Manchester
- Country: England, United Kingdom
- Organisation(s): BDO
- Format: Legs; Finals: best of 25 (men's) best of 13 (women's)
- Prize fund: £40,000 (men), £10,500 (women)
- Winner's share: £10,000 (men), £3,000 (women
- High checkout: 151 (Lithuania) Darius Labanauskas

Champion(s)
- (Belgium) Geert De Vos (men) (England) Lisa Ashton (women)

The 2015 Winmau BDO World Trophy is a major darts tournament run by the British Darts Organisation, hosted between 26 February – 1 March 2015 at Event City, Manchester. This event organized by the BDO Events – the new commercial arm of the British Darts Organisation.

== Prize Fund ==
- Winner £10,000 (men), £3,000 (women)
- Runner Up £5,000 (men), £1,500 (women)
- Joint 3rd 2 x £2,000 (men), 2 x £1,000 (women)
- Joint 5th 4 x £1,500 (men), 4 x £500 (women)
- Joint 9th 8 x £750 (men), 8 x £250 (women)
- Joint 17th 16 x £500 (men)
- Totals £50,500 (£40,000 men, £10,500 women)

== Qualifiers ==
=== Men ===
Top 16 in Invitational rankings (seeds)
1. (England) Scott Mitchell
2. (England) Martin Adams
3. (England) Glen Durrant
4. (Wales) Martin Phillips
5. (England) Jamie Hughes
6. (England) Gary Robson
7. (Netherlands) Wesley Harms
8. (Scotland) Ross Montgomery
9. (England) ~~Scott Waites~~
10. (England) Darryl Fitton
11. (Netherlands) Remco van Eijden
12. (England) Tony O'Shea
13. (Netherlands) Jeffrey de Graaf
14. (England) Pip Blackwell
15. (Netherlands) Rick Hofstra
16. (Latvia) Madars Razma

WDF regional qualifiers
1. (Canada) David Cameron
2. (England) Ted Hankey
3. (Canada) Jeff Smith
4. (Japan) Hiroaki Shimizu
5. (Australia) Eddy Sims
6. (Netherlands) Willem Mandigers
7. (Belgium) Geert De Vos
8. (United States) Jim Widmayer
9. (Sweden) Peter Sajwani
10. (Lithuania) Darius Labanauskas
11. (England) Paul Jennings
12. (Czech Republic) Karel Sedláček

Qualifiers
1. (Wales) Wayne Warren
2. (Belgium) Stefaan Deprez
3. (England) Ritchie Edhouse
4. (England) Mark McGeeney

Alternate
1. (England) Sam Hewson

==== Draw ====
First Round (best of 11 legs)
1	(England) Scott Mitchell 92.43	6
(Canada) David Cameron 88.08	3
16	(Latvia) Madars Razma 85.29	4
(Wales) Wayne Warren 94.32	6
Alt	(England) Sam Hewson 87.57	6
(England) Ted Hankey 84.45	4
8	(Scotland) Ross Montgomery 86.34	4
(Canada) Jeff Smith 84.33	6
12	(England) Tony O'Shea 77.76	1
(Belgium) Stefaan Deprez 84.66	6
5	(England) Jamie Hughes 80.52	6
(Japan) Hiroaki Shimizu 72.63	0
13	(Netherlands) Jeffrey de Graaf 99.09	6
(Australia) Eddy Sims 81.99	0
4	(Wales) Martin Phillips 83.91	6
(Netherlands) Willem Mandigers 86.34	3
15	(Netherlands) Rick Hofstra 83.19	3
(Belgium) Geert De Vos 84.84	6
2	(England) Martin Adams 89.28	5
(United States) Jim Widmayer 85.32	6
10	(England) Darryl Fitton 96.42	6
(England) Ritchie Edhouse 94.02	1
7	(Netherlands) Wesley Harms 86.58	6
(Sweden) Peter Sajwani 81.78	4
11	(Netherlands) Remco van Eijden 88.44	4
(England) Mark McGeeney 91.86	6
6	(England) Gary Robson 93.60	6
(Lithuania) Darius Labanauskas 96.03	5
14	(England) Pip Blackwell 86.46	6
(England) Paul Jennings 67.17	2
3	(England) Glen Durrant 103.44	6
(Czech Republic) Karel Sedláček 88.68	1

Last 16 (best of 13 legs)
1	(England) Scott Mitchell 92.88	2
(Wales) Wayne Warren 93.48	7
Alt	(England) Sam Hewson 91.83	3
(Canada) Jeff Smith 98.31	7
(Belgium) Stefaan Deprez 83.01	7
5	(England) Jamie Hughes 84.03	4
13	(Netherlands) Jeffrey de Graaf 93.99	7
4	(Wales) Martin Phillips 94.29	6
(Belgium) Geert De Vos 82.20	7
(United States) Jim Widmayer 72.15	0
10	(England) Darryl Fitton 93.69	6
7	(Netherlands) Wesley Harms 88.17	7
(England) Mark McGeeney 98.76	7
6	(England) Gary Robson 85.53	3
14	(England) Pip Blackwell 95.40	4
3	(England) Glen Durrant 98.97	7

Quarter-Finals (best of 15 legs)
(Wales) Wayne Warren 87.66	7
(Canada) Jeff Smith 90.78	8
(Belgium) Stefaan Deprez 84.96	5
13	(Netherlands) Jeffrey de Graaf 90.48	8
(Belgium) Geert De Vos 84.40	8
7	(Netherlands) Wesley Harms 84.01	5
(England) Mark McGeeney 90.50	8
3	(England) Glen Durrant 89.18	4

Semi-Finals (best of 17 legs)
(Canada) Jeff Smith 88.05	7
13	(Netherlands) Jeffrey de Graaf 92.25	9
(Belgium) Geert De Vos 89.58	9
(England) Mark McGeeney 89.55	8

Final (best of 19 legs)
13	(Netherlands) Jeffrey de Graaf 88.20	9
(Belgium) Geert De Vos 86.30	10

- Sam Hewson replaced Scott Waites who withdrew through shoulder injury.

=== Women ===
==== Draw ====
First Round (best of 7 legs); 26–27 Feb
1	(Russia) Anastasia Dobromyslova 70.92	4
(England) Casey Gallagher 62.94	3
8	(England) Lorraine Winstanley 77.58	1
(Wales) Rhian Griffiths 77.94	4
4	(England) Fallon Sherrock 88.71	4
(England) Paula Jacklin 76.14	0
5	(Netherlands) Aileen de Graaf 75.42	4
(Denmark) Ann-Louise Peters 60.36	1
2	(England) Deta Hedman 74.73	4
(England) Trina Gulliver 65.70	2
7	(England) Rachel Brooks 72.12	4
(Germany) Irina Armstrong 70.50	3
3	(England) Lisa Ashton 80.70	4
(Sweden) Maud Jansson 76.80	1
6	(England) Zoe Jones 63.69	4
(Netherlands) Anneke Kuijten 57.60	2

Quarter-Finals (best of 9 legs); 28 Feb
1	(Russia) Anastasia Dobromyslova 75.81	5
(Wales) Rhian Griffiths 75.03	3
4	(England) Fallon Sherrock 83.58	5
5	(Netherlands) Aileen de Graaf 81.57	3
2	(England) Deta Hedman 80.76	5
7	(England) Rachel Brooks 68.82	3
3	(England) Lisa Ashton 87.39	5
6	(England) Zoe Jones 58.56	0

Semi-Finals (best of 11 legs); 1 Mar
1	(Russia) Anastasia Dobromyslova 75.39	6
4	(England) Fallon Sherrock 78.03	3
2	(England) Deta Hedman 81.63	3
3	(England) Lisa Ashton 81.00	6

Final (best of 13 legs); 1 Mar
1	(Russia) Anastasia Dobromyslova 73.89	5
3	(England) Lisa Ashton 77.67	7

== Television coverage ==
The event is live on British Eurosport. The Winmau website will show live coverage of all four days.
