= Stefaan Deprez =

Belgian darts player

Personal information
- Nickname: "The Flaming Fleming"
- Born: 22 June 1972 (age 54) Antwerp, Belgium
- Home town: Antwerp, Belgium

Sport
- Sport: Darts
- Playing since: 2001
- Darts: 22g
- Laterality: Right-handed
- Walk-on music: "Let's Get Rocked" by Def Leppard

Organisation (see split in darts)
- BDO: 2001–2018
- PDC: 2019
- WDF: 2001–2018, 2022–
- Current world ranking: (WDF) NR (17 August 2026)

WDF major events – best performances
- World Masters: Last 48: 2013, 2014
- World Trophy: Quarter Final: 2015
- Dutch Open: Semi Final: 2018

Stefaan Deprez (born 22 June 1972) is a Belgian professional darts player who plays in the World Darts Federation (WDF) events. His best achievement so far has been an advance to the BDO World Trophy quarter-finals and the Dutch Open semi-finals. He has represented Belgium twice during the WDF World Cup and WDF Europe Cup tournaments.

== Career ==
Deprez made his first participation in an international tournament in 2001 during Belgium Open. Despite achieving a good result, he decided not to develop darts and focused on his job. He returned to the international arena in 2006 during the Sunparks Masters and in 2008 he took part in the Spring Cup and the Antwerp Open. Since 2009, he has taken part in the World Masters tournament seven times. He achieved the best results in the 2013 World Masters and 2014 World Masters. In 2010, he became the runner-up in Belgium Championship.

In the same period, he went abroad much more often to take part in other international tournaments and climb the ranking of the British Darts Organisation. During this period, he became in the quarter-finals of the Dortmund Open, reached the semi-finals in the Tops of Ghent, played in the Swiss Open final and passed the quarter-finals at the Swedish Open and French Open. In 2014, he won the qualification for the 2015 BDO World Trophy.

During the tournament itself, he was in very good shape. He defeated Tony O'Shea in the first round without any problems. In the second round, he defeated Jamie Hughes, who was seeded number five. In the quarter-finals he faced eventual finalist Jeffrey de Graaf and lost to him by 5–8 in legs. After his success, he took part in many international tournaments, which allowed him to move up to 32nd place in the British Darts Organisation ranking. During the 2015 Winmau World Masters he started seeded, but he has already lost his first duel.

In October 2015, he was selected for the Belgium national team during the 2015 WDF World Cup. In singles competition he beat Brian Løkken in the first round by 0–4 in legs, but lost in the second round to Daniel Larsson by 1–4 in legs. In the pairs competition, he reached the quarter-final. In the following years, he appeared abroad less often. In 2018, however, he advanced to the semi-finals at the Dutch Open. On his way to the final phase, he defeated Ross Montgomery, Wessel Nijman, Darius Labanauskas and Jim Williams. Finally, he lost to Mark McGeeney by 0–2 in sets.

In 2019, he only participated in Professional Darts Corporation tournaments for non-card players. Due to the coronavirus pandemic, he decided to abandon further involvement in Professional Darts Corporation and for two years he did not participate in any international tournaments. In 2022, he took part in the Belgium Open. Thanks to the results at home competitions, he was selected for the first time to represent Belgium at the 2022 WDF Europe Cup.

== Performance timeline ==
Tournament	2009	2010	2011	2012	2013	2014	2015	2016	2017	2018	2019	2020	2021	2022	2023
WDF Ranked televised events
World Masters	1R	1R	2R	2R	4R	4R	1R	DNQ				NH			
World Trophy	NH					DNQ	QF	DNQ				NH			
Dutch Open	DNP						6R	DNP		SF	DNP		NH	DNP	
