= 2016 Denmark Open darts =

Denmark Open

Tournament information
- Dates: 30 April 2016
- Location: Blue Water Dokken, Esbjerg
- Country: Denmark
- Organisation(s): BDO, WDF, DDU
- Winner's share: 30,000 DKK

Champion(s)
- (Lithuania) Darius Labanauskas

2016 Denmark Open is a darts tournament, which took place in Esbjerg, Denmark on April 30, 2016.

== Results ==
=== Last 64 ===
Round	Player
Last 16	(Sweden) Oskar Lukasiak
Last 16	(Belgium) Roger Janssen
Last 16	(England) Conan Whitehead
Last 16	(England) Martin Atkins
Last 16	(Belgium) Sven Verdonck
Last 16	(England) David Carr
Last 16	(Wales) Dean Reynolds
Last 16	(Denmark) Vladimir Andersen
Last 32	(Belgium) Geert De Vos
Last 32	(Latvia) Madars Razma
Last 32	(Wales) Jim Williams
Last 32	(Republic of Ireland) Steve Lennon
Last 32	(Netherlands) Richard Veenstra
Last 32	(England) James Hurrell
Last 32	(Netherlands) Jimmy Hendriks
Last 32	(Sweden) Daniel Larsson
Last 32	(Netherlands) Gino Vos
Last 32	(England) Andrew Rose
Last 32	(Denmark) Frank Andreasen
Last 32	(Denmark) Nicolai Olsen
Last 32	(Belgium) Sven Wens
Last 32	(Denmark) Mogens Christensen
Last 32	(Denmark) Palle Madsen
Last 32	(Denmark) Steen Lysen
Last 64	(England) Jamie Holmes
Last 64	(Denmark) Per Laursen
Last 64	(Republic of Ireland) Michael Meaney
Last 64	(Denmark) Morten Olsen
Last 64	(Denmark) Per Skau
Last 64	(Norway) Robin Lundemo Eidet
Last 64	(Denmark) Søren Arnstrup
Last 64	(Denmark) Steffen Olling
Last 64	(Denmark) Ulrich Meyn
Last 64	(England) Lewis McGurn
Last 64	(England) Ryan Joyce
Last 64	(England) Phil Blackwell
Last 64	(England) Bradley Kirk
Last 64	(England) Mick Baker
Last 64	(England) Darryl Fitton
Last 64	(Netherlands) Willem Mandigers
Last 64	(England) Tony O'Shea
Last 64	(Netherlands) Daan Groen
Last 64	(Denmark) Daniel Jahn Hadberg
Last 64	(Denmark) Dennis Lindskjold
Last 64	(England) Gareth Watts
Last 64	(Denmark) Heine Rasmussen
Last 64	(Denmark) Jimmi Andersen
Last 64	(England) Steve Pearce
Last 64	(Denmark) Leif Nielsen
Last 64	(Netherlands) Jeffrey Sparidaans
Last 64	(England) Shaun Carroll
Last 64	(Wales) Nick Kenny
Last 64	(Denmark) Lars Helsinghof
Last 64	(Denmark) Benny Nielsen
Last 64	(Denmark) Bent Erik Højhus
Last 64	(Denmark) Carl Henrik Hansen

=== Final 8 ===
Quarter-finals
(Lithuania)	Darius Labanauskas	4
(Scotland)	Ross Montgomery	2
(England)	Jamie Hughes	4
(Netherlands)	Danny Noppert	1
(Belgium)	Davy Van Baelen	4
(Netherlands)	Wouter Vaes	1
(England)	Glen Durrant	4
(Wales)	Richie Edwards	0

Semi-finals
(Lithuania)	Darius Labanauskas	5
(England)	Jamie Hughes	1
(Belgium)	Davy Van Baelen	5
(England)	Glen Durrant	3

Final
(Lithuania)	Darius Labanauskas	6
(Belgium)	Davy Van Baelen	5
