= Swiss Open (disambiguation) =

Swiss Open, or Omega European Masters, is the Swiss stop on professional men's golf's European Tour.

Swiss Open may also refer to:

- Swiss Open (badminton), an annual badminton tournament
- Swiss Open (tennis), a tennis tournament on the ATP Tour
- WTA Swiss Open, a former women's tennis tournament
- Swiss Open (darts)
