= 2015 World Masters (darts) =

Winmau World Masters

Tournament information
- Dates: 8–11 October
- Venue: Levi City Hall
- Location: East Riding of Yorkshire
- Country: England
- Organisation(s): BDO
- Format: Sets for men, Legs for women, boys and girls
- Prize fund: £70,500
- Winner's share: £25,000 (men), £5,000 (women)

Champion(s)
- (England) Glen Durrant (men) (Netherlands) Aileen de Graaf (Women) (Netherlands) Justin van Tergouw (boys) (England) Danielle Ashton (girls)

The 2015 Winmau World Masters was a major tournament on the BDO/WDF calendar for 2015. It took place from 8–11 October at the Hull City Hall, which hosted the stage element of the event for the fourth year.

== Men's Seeds ==
The seedings were finalised on 31 August. For the fourth consecutive year, there are 32 seeds (an increase from 8 between 2007–2011) with the Top 16 exempt until the Last 32 stage.

1. (England) Glen Durrant (winner)
2. (England) Martin Adams (semi-finals)
3. (England) Scott Mitchell (last 32)
4. (England) Jamie Hughes (quarter-finals)
5. (Netherlands) Wesley Harms (last 32)
6. (Belgium) Geert De Vos (last 32)
7. (Netherlands) Jeffrey de Graaf (last 32)
8. (England) Darryl Fitton (last 16)
9. (Wales) Martin Phillips (quarter-finals)
10. (England) Pip Blackwell (quarter-finals)
11. (England) Scott Waites (quarter-finals)
12. (England) Gary Robson (last 32)
13. (Wales) Jim Williams (last 32)
14. (Latvia) Madars Razma (last 16)
15. (Scotland) Ross Montgomery (last 32)
16. (England) Mark McGeeney (last 16)
17. (Netherlands) Willem Mandigers (last 32)
18. (England) Martin Atkins (last 272)
19. (England) Sam Hewson (last 272)
20. (Lithuania) Darius Labanauskas (last 16)
21. (England) Tony O'Shea (last 272)
22. (Netherlands) Ryan de Vreede (last 144)
23. (England) Brian Dawson (last 32)
24. (England) James Hurrell (last 32)
25. (England) Ted Hankey (last 80)
26. (Netherlands) Michel van der Horst (last 144)
27. (Netherlands) Richard Veenstra (last 16)
28. (United States) Jim Widmayer (last 272)
29. (Wales) Dean Reynolds (last 80)
30. (England) Dennis Harbour (last 48)
31. (Canada) Jeff Smith (last 80)
32. (Belgium) Stefaan Deprez (last 272)

Ton Table
Tournament 180s
Tournament 140s
Tournament 100s

== Men's Draw ==
Last 32 onwards. Sets are best of 3 legs.

=== Last 32 ===
Last 32 (best of 3 sets)

9 October

Last 16 (best of 3 sets)

10 October

Quarter-Finals (best of 5 sets)

11 October

Semi-Finals (best of 7 sets)

11 October

Final (best of 9 sets)

11 October

1
(England) Glen Durrant 95.34
3

(Canada) John Norman Jnr 79.05
0

1
(England) Glen Durrant 97.68
3

16
(England) Mark McGeeney 95.28
0

16
(England) Mark McGeeney 89.91
3

17
(Netherlands) Willem Mandigers 87.36
0

1
(England) Glen Durrant 104.93
3

9
(Wales) Martin Phillips 95.85
1

8
(England) Darryl Fitton 90.57
3

(Northern Ireland) Kyle McKinstry 79.77
1

8
(England) Darryl Fitton 92.55
2

9
(Wales) Martin Phillips 97.77
3

9
(Wales) Martin Phillips 89.19
3

24
(England) James Hurrell 91.17
2

1
(England) Glen Durrant 94.96
5

(Switzerland) Thomas Junghans 89.42
1

5
(Netherlands) Wesley Harms 90.90
2

(Switzerland) Thomas Junghans 88.53
3

(Switzerland) Thomas Junghans 87.33
3

(Netherlands) Danny Noppert 81.57
2

12
(England) Gary Robson 87.69
1

(Netherlands) Danny Noppert 93.06
3

(Switzerland) Thomas Junghans 87.55
3

4
(England) Jamie Hughes 82.89
1

4
(England) Jamie Hughes 92.01
3

(England) Allan Edwards 64.74
0

4
(England) Jamie Hughes 90.36
3

20
(Lithuania) Darius Labanauskas 86.10
1

13
(Wales) Jim Williams 84.24
1

20
(Lithuania) Darius Labanauskas 81.06
3

1
(England) Glen Durrant 93.22
7

(United States) Larry Butler 92.53
3

2
(England) Martin Adams 91.77
3

(Republic of Ireland) David Concannon 85.44
1

2
(England) Martin Adams 99.96
3

(Poland) Krzysztof Ratajski 86.55
2

15
(Scotland) Ross Montgomery 81.87
1

(Poland) Krzysztof Ratajski 88.26
3

2
(England) Martin Adams 81.79
3

10
(England) Pip Blackwell 79.22
1

7
(Netherlands) Jeffrey de Graaf 77.58
1

(Belgium) Sven Verdonck 82.95
3

(Belgium) Sven Verdonck 75.87
0

10
(England) Pip Blackwell 82.56
3

10
(England) Pip Blackwell 86.70
3

23
(England) Brian Dawson 85.74
1

2
(England) Martin Adams 91.94
4

(United States) Larry Butler 91.98
5

6
(Belgium) Geert De Vos 87.87
2

27
(Netherlands) Richard Veenstra 90.66
3

27
(Netherlands) Richard Veenstra 82.38
0

11
(England) Scott Waites 92.85
3

11
(England) Scott Waites 94.86
3

(New Zealand) Cody Harris 99.42
0

11
(England) Scott Waites 97.38
1

(United States) Larry Butler 93.95
3

3
(England) Scott Mitchell 88.35
2

(United States) Larry Butler 87.39
3

(United States) Larry Butler 87.30
3

14
(Latvia) Madars Razma 82.44
0

14
(Latvia) Madars Razma 78.78
3

(Sweden) Johan Engström 74.01
0

== Women's seeds ==
The seedings were finalised on 31 August. The women's seeds enter at the start of the competition.

1. (England) Deta Hedman (semi-finals)
2. (England) Fallon Sherrock (semi-finals)
3. (England) Lisa Ashton (runner-up)
4. (Netherlands) Aileen de Graaf (winner)
5. (Russia) Anastasia Dobromyslova (quarter-finals)
6. (England) Lorraine Winstanley (last 32)
7. (England) Zoe Jones (last 128)
8. (England) Rachel Brooks (last 256)
9. (England) Trina Gulliver (last 16)
10. (England) Casey Gallagher (last 16)
11. (England) Paula Jacklin (last 64)
12. (Denmark) Ann-Louise Peters (last 64)
13. (Netherlands) Anca Zijlstra (last 32)
14. (England) Margaret Sutton (last 128)
15. (Germany) Irina Armstrong (did not play)
16. (England) Sue Gulliver (last 16)

== Women's draw ==
Last 8 onwards.

Quarter-finals; Best of 7 legs Losers £500
1	(England) Deta Hedman 72.00	4
(England) Claire Brookin 75.27	3
5	(Russia) Anastasia Dobromyslova 70.38	2
4	(Netherlands) Aileen de Graaf 78.69	4
3	(England) Lisa Ashton 77.13	4
(Japan) Mayumi Ouchi 72.00	2
(Japan) Akari Oshiro 78.57	3
2	(England) Fallon Sherrock 77.43	4

Semi-finals; Best of 7 legs Losers £750
1	(England) Deta Hedman 81.33	3
4	(Netherlands) Aileen de Graaf 85.38	4
3	(England) Lisa Ashton 78.79	4
2	(England) Fallon Sherrock 77.42	1

Final; Best of 9 legs Winner £5,000; Runner up £2,000
4	(Netherlands) Aileen de Graaf 82.51	5
3	(England) Lisa Ashton 83.78	4

== Boys Final ==
Date	Winner	Score	Runner-up	Ref
Friday 9 October	(Netherlands) Justin van Tergouw 82.41	4–2	(England) Joshua Richardson 81.45	

== Girls Final ==
Date	Winner	Score	Runner-up	Ref
Friday 9 October	(England) Danielle Ashton 46.38	4–1	(Scotland) Rebecca Graham 45.60	
