= 2009 BDO World Darts Championship =

Tournament information
- Dates: 3–11 January 2009
- Venue: Lakeside Country Club
- Location: Frimley Green, Surrey
- Country: England, United Kingdom
- Organisation(s): BDO
- Format: Sets; Finals: best of 13 (men's) best of 3 (women's)
- Prize fund: £320,000
- Winner's share: £100,000 (men's) £6,000 (women's)
- High checkout: Men's: (England) Martin Adams (161) (England) Ted Hankey (161); Women's: (England) Trina Gulliver (125)

Champion(s)
- (England) Ted Hankey (Netherlands) Francis Hoenselaar

The 2009 BDO World Darts Championship (known for sponsorship reasons as the 2009 Lakeside World Professional Darts Championship) was the 32nd World Championship organised by the British Darts Organisation. Mark Webster was the defending men's champion, but he was eliminated 4–0 by John Walton in the second round.

The title was eventually won by 2000 champion Ted Hankey, who won 7–6 against Tony O'Shea, in a match which lasted just under two and a half hours. The defending women's champion, Anastasia Dobromyslova, was due to defend her championship, having beaten seven-time champion Trina Gulliver in the 2008 final, but on 7 December 2008 she resigned from the BDO/WDF setup after her defeat in the World Masters to Francis Hoenselaar. It later emerged that she had accepted the 70th and last place into the rival PDC World Championship, replacing an Indian qualifier. This meant that for the first time, the defending women's champion would not be returning to defend her title. Hoenselaar, a five-time runner-up, won her first world title by beating Gulliver – the player that had beaten her each time – by two sets to one.

The event took place from 3–11 January 2009 and for the 24th time, the tournament took place at the Lakeside Country Club in Frimley Green.

== Format and qualifiers ==
=== Men's ===
The televised stages featured 32 players. The top 16 players in the WDF/BDO rankings over the 2007–08 season were seeded for the tournament. They were joined by 16 other players who had either been invited by right (10 of the sixteen in this method), a standby player (Stephen Bunting) with 5 other qualifiers determined at the International Playoffs, which were held on 4 December 2008 in Bridlington.

Top 16
1. (Scotland) Gary Anderson
2. (Wales) Mark Webster
3. (England) Martin Adams
4. (England) Scott Waites
5. (England) Darryl Fitton
6. (England) Gary Robson
7. (England) Ted Hankey
8. (Netherlands) Edwin Max
9. (England) Tony O'Shea
10. (Scotland) Ross Montgomery
11. (England) Martin Atkins
12. (Australia) Simon Whitlock
13. (England) Steve West
14. (England) Garry Thompson
15. (England) John Walton
16. (Australia) Eddy Sims

Other qualifiers
1. (Scotland) Mark Barilli
2. (Netherlands) Joey ten Berge
3. (England) Shaun Greatbatch
4. (Wales) Robert Hughes
5. (England) Alan Norris
6. (Wales) Martin Phillips
7. (Wales) Mark Salmon
8. (Norway) Robert Wagner
9. (Netherlands) Willy van de Wiel
10. (England) Brian Woods

Bridlington qualifiers
1. (England) Dave Chisnall
2. (Northern Ireland) Daryl Gurney
3. (Sweden) Daniel Larsson
4. (Poland) Krzysztof Ratajski
5. (England) Ross Smith
Standby player
- (England) Stephen Bunting

=== Women's ===
The televised stages featured 8 players.

Top 4
1. (England) Trina Gulliver
2. (Netherlands) Francis Hoenselaar
3. (Wales) Julie Gore
4. (Netherlands) Karin Krappen

Standby player
- (Netherlands) Rilana Erades
Replacement
- (Netherlands) Carla Molema

Bridlington qualifiers
1. (England) Lisa Ashton
2. (Scotland) Anne Kirk

== Prize money ==
The 2009 World Championship featured a prize fund of £320,000 – a rise of £10,000 on the previous year. The only monetary change was that the Men's Champion received £100,000 instead of £85,000 as received by Mark Webster at the 2008 championship.

Men's Champion: £100,000 (up from £85,000)
Runner-up: £30,000
Semi-Finalists (2): £11,000
Quarter-Finalists (4): £6,000
Second Round (8): £4,250
First Round (16): £3,000

Women's Champion: £6,000
Runner-up: £2,000
Semi-Finalists (2): £1,000
Quarter-Finalists (4): £500

Nine dart finish: £75,000
Highest checkout: £3,000

== Men's ==
- Match distances in sets are quoted in brackets at the top of each round. All sets best of five legs, unless there is a final set tie-break

First Round (best of 5 sets)
1 | (Scotland) Gary Anderson (95.15) | 3
(Norway) Robert Wagner (88.33) | 2
16 | (Australia) Eddy Sims (79.78) | 2
(Wales) Robert Hughes (82.21) | 3
8 | (Netherlands) Edwin Max (78.86) | 3
(Poland) Krzysztof Ratajski (81.17) | 2
9 | (England) Tony O'Shea (91.18) | 3
(Sweden) Daniel Larsson (81.23) | 0
5 | (England) Darryl Fitton (79.11) | 3
(Wales) Mark Salmon (65.46) | 0
12 | (Australia) Simon Whitlock (94.94) | 3
(Scotland) Mark Barilli (77.24) | 0
4 | (England) Scott Waites (86.57) | 3
(England) Ross Smith (67.61) | 0
13 | (England) Steve West (84.24) | 0
(England) Alan Norris (88.09) | 3
2 | (Wales) Mark Webster (88.51) | 3
(Netherlands) Willy van de Wiel (73.73) | 0
15 | (England) John Walton (84.32) | 3
(England) Shaun Greatbatch (71.28) | 0
7 | (England) Ted Hankey (91.91) | 3
(England) Brian Woods (84.00) | 0
10 | (Scotland) Ross Montgomery (89.92) | 3
(Wales) Martin Phillips (82.05) | 1
6 | (England) Gary Robson (98.36) | 3
Alt | (England) Stephen Bunting (91.48) | 1
11 | (England) Martin Atkins (87.11) | 3
(Netherlands) Joey ten Berge (82.63) | 2
3 | (England) Martin Adams (92.52) | 3
(England) Dave Chisnall (89.26) | 2
14 | (England) Garry Thompson (82.88) | 1
(Northern Ireland) Daryl Gurney (86.49) | 3

Second round (best of 7)
1 | (Scotland) Gary Anderson (94.88) | 4
(Wales) Robert Hughes (87.63) | 2
8 | (Netherlands) Edwin Max (87.83) | 0
9 | (England) Tony O'Shea (91.87) | 4
5 | (England) Darryl Fitton (97.95) | 4
12 | (Australia) Simon Whitlock (92.24) | 2
4 | (England) Scott Waites (95.71) | 4
(England) Alan Norris (89.30) | 0
2 | (Wales) Mark Webster (90.10) | 0
15 | (England) John Walton (92.38) | 4
7 | (England) Ted Hankey (91.48) | 4
10 | (Scotland) Ross Montgomery (89.38) | 1
6 | (England) Gary Robson (89.26) | 4
11 | (England) Martin Atkins (84.55) | 1
3 | (England) Martin Adams (91.51) | 4
(Northern Ireland) Daryl Gurney (88.74) | 2

Quarter-Finals (best of 9)
1 | (Scotland) Gary Anderson (89.49) | 3
9 | (England) Tony O'Shea (87.12) | 5
5 | (England) Darryl Fitton (92.48) | 5
4 | (England) Scott Waites (90.48) | 4
15 | (England) John Walton (87.52) | 1
7 | (England) Ted Hankey (88.47) | 5
6 | (England) Gary Robson (91.91) | 4
3 | (England) Martin Adams (92.12) | 5

Semi-Finals (best of 11)
9 | (England) Tony O'Shea (93.32) | 6
5 | (England) Darryl Fitton (92.42) | 4
7 | (England) Ted Hankey (95.88) | 6
3 | (England) Martin Adams (94.53) | 4

Final (best of 13)
9 | (England) Tony O'Shea (90.54) | 6
7 | (England) Ted Hankey (91.47) | 7

=== Women's ===
- All matches best of three sets, best of five legs.

Quarter-finals; 3–4 January
4 | (Netherlands) Karin Krappen 68.50 | 3 | 1 | 3
(Scotland) Anne Kirk 67.31 | 2 | 3 | 1
1 | (England) Trina Gulliver 83.31 | 3 | 3
(England) Lisa Ashton 75.87 | 1 | 0
3 | (Wales) Julie Gore 66.34 | 3 | 0 | 2
(Netherlands) Rilana Erades 67.67 | 1 | 3 | 3
2 | (Netherlands) Francis Hoenselaar 76.65 | 3 | 3
(Netherlands) Carla Molema 71.19 | 1 | 1

Semi-finals; 8 January
4 | (Netherlands) Karin Krappen 64.40 | 1 | 1
1 | (England) Trina Gulliver 78.29 | 3 | 3
(Netherlands) Rilana Erades 65.57 | 1 | 1
2 | (Netherlands) Francis Hoenselaar 72.96 | 3 | 3

Final; 9 January
1 | (England) Trina Gulliver 75.19 | 2 | 3 | 0
2 | (Netherlands) Francis Hoenselaar 77.39 | 3 | 0 | 3

== Statistics ==
=== Men's ===
| Player | Played | Sets Won | Sets Lost | Legs Won | Legs Lost | 100+ | 140+ | 180s | High Checkout | 3-dart Average |
|---|---|---|---|---|---|---|---|---|---|---|
| (Australia) Simon Whitlock | 2 | 5 | 4 | 20 | 16 | 45 | 19 | 10 | 95 | 93.12 |
| (England) Martin Adams | 4 | 16 | 14 | 69 | 60 | 188 | 106 | 25 | 161 | 92.83 |
| (England) Gary Robson | 3 | 11 | 7 | 39 | 32 | 76 | 64 | 22 | 105 | 92.59 |
| (Scotland) Gary Anderson | 3 | 10 | 9 | 41 | 35 | 105 | 60 | 21 | 144 | 92.46 |
| (England) Darryl Fitton | 4 | 16 | 12 | 65 | 51 | 148 | 72 | 32 | 124 | 92.29 |
| (England) Ted Hankey | 5 | 24 | 11 | 91 | 62 | 200 | 116 | 42 | 161 | 92.20 |
| (England) Stephen Bunting | 1 | 1 | 3 | 6 | 11 | 20 | 14 | 3 | 90 | 91.48 |
| (England) Scott Waites | 3 | 11 | 5 | 38 | 29 | 86 | 50 | 18 | 130 | 91.12 |
| (England) Tony O'Shea | 5 | 23 | 13 | 87 | 71 | 211 | 132 | 30 | 130 | 90.68 |
| (Scotland) Ross Montgomery | 2 | 4 | 5 | 19 | 17 | 44 | 33 | 4 | 156 | 89.61 |
| (Wales) Mark Webster | 2 | 3 | 4 | 13 | 13 | 24 | 15 | 8 | 103 | 89.44 |
| (England) Dave Chisnall | 1 | 2 | 3 | 10 | 13 | 21 | 14 | 8 | 96 | 89.26 |
| (Sweden) Alan Norris | 2 | 3 | 4 | 14 | 13 | 39 | 23 | 1 | 87 | 88.82 |
| (England) John Walton | 3 | 8 | 5 | 29 | 20 | 65 | 25 | 11 | 126 | 88.36 |
| (Norway) Robert Wagner | 1 | 2 | 3 | 6 | 12 | 22 | 13 | 2 | 96 | 88.33 |
| (Northern Ireland) Daryl Gurney | 2 | 5 | 5 | 23 | 21 | 65 | 30 | 5 | 120 | 87.93 |
| (England) Martin Atkins | 2 | 4 | 6 | 16 | 20 | 36 | 28 | 5 | 118 | 85.70 |
| (Wales) Robert Hughes | 2 | 5 | 6 | 22 | 23 | 78 | 24 | 4 | 117 | 84.92 |
| (England) Steve West | 1 | 0 | 3 | 1 | 9 | 14 | 5 | 0 | 8 | 84.24 |
| (England) Brian Woods | 1 | 0 | 3 | 2 | 9 | 14 | 8 | 0 | 83 | 84.00 |
| (England) Garry Thompson | 1 | 1 | 3 | 5 | 10 | 19 | 10 | 2 | 100 | 82.88 |
| (Netherlands) Joey ten Berge | 1 | 2 | 3 | 7 | 9 | 18 | 10 | 3 | 121 | 82.63 |
| (Netherlands) Edwin Max | 2 | 3 | 6 | 15 | 22 | 28 | 22 | 6 | 123 | 82.21 |
| (Wales) Martin Phillips | 1 | 1 | 3 | 4 | 11 | 19 | 10 | 1 | 16 | 82.05 |
| (Sweden) Daniel Larsson | 1 | 0 | 3 | 3 | 9 | 14 | 7 | 1 | 52 | 81.23 |
| (Poland) Krzysztof Ratajski | 1 | 2 | 3 | 10 | 12 | 26 | 11 | 3 | 127 | 81.17 |
| (Australia) Eddy Sims | 1 | 2 | 3 | 8 | 13 | 31 | 15 | 2 | 64 | 79.78 |
| (Scotland) Mark Barilli | 1 | 0 | 3 | 2 | 9 | 11 | 4 | 0 | 77 | 77.24 |
| (Netherlands) Willy van de Wiel | 1 | 0 | 3 | 1 | 9 | 14 | 3 | 1 | 36 | 73.73 |
| (England) Shaun Greatbatch | 1 | 0 | 3 | 1 | 9 | 11 | 1 | 3 | 36 | 71.28 |
| (England) Ross Smith | 1 | 0 | 3 | 1 | 9 | 8 | 1 | 0 | 9 | 67.61 |
| (Wales) Mark Salmon | 1 | 0 | 3 | 0 | 9 | 10 | 0 | 0 | — | 65.46 |

=== Women's ===
| Player | Played | Sets Won | Sets Lost | Legs Won | Legs Lost | 100+ | 140+ | 180s | High Checkout | 3-dart Average |
|---|---|---|---|---|---|---|---|---|---|---|
| (England) Trina Gulliver | 3 | 5 | 2 | 17 | 9 | 35 | 8 | 7 | 125 | 78.36 |
| (England) Lisa Ashton | 1 | 0 | 2 | 1 | 6 | 8 | 3 | 1 | 24 | 75.87 |
| (Netherlands) Francis Hoenselaar | 3 | 6 | 1 | 18 | 9 | 30 | 18 | 3 | 114 | 75.76 |
| (Netherlands) Carla Molema | 1 | 0 | 2 | 2 | 6 | 9 | 4 | 0 | 60 | 71.19 |
| (Scotland) Anne Kirk | 1 | 1 | 2 | 6 | 7 | 15 | 4 | 0 | 52 | 67.31 |
| (Netherlands) Karin Krappen | 2 | 2 | 3 | 9 | 12 | 21 | 6 | 0 | 80 | 67.06 |
| (Netherlands) Rilana Erades | 2 | 2 | 3 | 9 | 11 | 22 | 7 | 1 | 58 | 66.86 |
| (Wales) Julie Gore | 1 | 1 | 2 | 5 | 7 | 10 | 5 | 0 | 80 | 66.34 |

== Tournament review ==
=== Day One, Saturday 3 January ===
==== Men's ====
- The first six games of the first round

Gary Anderson 3–2 Robert Wagner (2–3, 3–0, 1–3, 3–0, 3–0)
Simon Whitlock 3–0 Mark Barilli (3–2, 3–0, 3–0)
Eddy Sims 2–3 Robert Hughes (3–2, 1–3, 3–2, 0–3, 1–3)
Tony O'Shea 3–0 Daniel Larsson (3–1, 3–0, 3–2)
Darryl Fitton 3–0 Mark Salmon (3–0, 3–0, 3–0)
Edwin Max 3–2 Krzysztof Ratajski (3–2, 1–3, 3–2, 2–3, 3–0)

==== Women's ====
- The first two quarter-finals

Trina Gulliver 2–0 Lisa Ashton (3–1, 3–0)
Karin Krappen 2–1 Anne Kirk (3–2, 1–3, 3–1)

The opening match of the 2009 world championships was between top seed Gary Anderson and Norway's Robert Wagner. Anderson won the match 3–2. Simon Whitlock, last year's runner-up, beat Mark Barilli 3–0. Tony O'Shea defeated Sweden's Daniel Larsson 3–0, while Darryl Fitton, the 5th seed, beat Mark Salmon 3–0 without dropping a leg. There were 3–2 wins for Edwin Max and Robert Hughes as well.

=== Day Two, Sunday 4 January ===
==== Men's ====
- Six more first round matches

Mark Webster 3–0 Willy van de Wiel (3–1, 3–0, 3–0)
Scott Waites 3–0 Ross Smith (3–0, 3–0, 3–1)
John Walton 3–0 Shaun Greatbatch (3–0, 3–1, 3–0)
Steve West 0–3 Alan Norris (1–3, 0–3, 0–3)
Ted Hankey 3–0 Brian Woods (3–0, 3–2, 3–0)
Gary Robson 3–1 Stephen Bunting (3–1, 3–1, 2–3, 3–1)

==== Women's ====
- The two remaining quarter-finals

Francis Hoenselaar 2–0 Carla Molema (3–1, 3–1)
Julie Gore 1–2 Rilana Erades (3–1, 0–3, 2–3)

The opening match saw Mark Webster begin the defence of his title and he beat Holland's Willy van de Wiel. 2008 Masters runner-up Scott Waites also won against Ross Smith 3–0. 2000 champion Ted Hankey and 2001 champion John Walton both had 3–0 wins over former semi-finalists Brian Woods and Shaun Greatbatch respectively. Greatbatch was diagnosed with multiple myeloma in June 2008. He received a guard of honour and a standing ovation after his match. Former World Darts Trophy champion Gary Robson overcame Stephen Bunting 3–1 in a match where he averaged 98. England's Alan Norris beat number 13 seed Steve West 3–0.

=== Day Three, Monday 5 January ===
- The four remaining first round matches

Martin Atkins 3–2 Joey ten Berge (3–1, 0–3, 3–0, 0–3, 3–0)
Martin Adams 3–2 Dave Chisnall (3–1, 2–3, 3–0, 0–3, 5–3)
Ross Montgomery 3–1 Martin Phillips (3–0, 2–3, 3–0, 3–1)
Garry Thompson 1–3 Daryl Gurney (1–3, 3–1, 1–3, 0–3)

Day three saw reigning Masters champion Martin Adams begin his 16th World Championship campaign. Adams beat Dave Chisnall 3–2 in a tiebreak. Martin Atkins also progressed by beating Joey ten Berge 3–2. Ross Montgomery saw off Martin Phillips 3–1 whilst debutant Daryl Gurney saw off number 14 seed and fellow debutant Garry Thompson 3–1.

=== Day Four, Tuesday 6 January ===
- The beginning of the second round

Tony O'Shea 4–0 Edwin Max (3–1, 3–1, 3–1, 3–0)
Simon Whitlock 2–4 Darryl Fitton (3–0, 0–3, 3–2, 2–3, 1–3, 2–3)
Robert Hughes 2–4 Gary Anderson (0–3, 3–1, 3–2, 1–3, 1–3, 1–3)
Alan Norris 0–4 Scott Waites (0–3, 2–3, 1–3, 2–3)

Day four saw the start of the second round. Tony O'Shea averaged 92 as he beat Holland's Edwin Max 4–0. Darryl Fitton averaged 98 beating the previous year's finalist Simon Whitlock 4–2 while Whitlock averaged 92. Top seed Gary Anderson made the quarter-finals beating Wales' Robert Hughes 4–2. World Masters runner-up Scott Waites reached the quarter-finals with a 4–0 win over Alan Norris.

=== Day Five, Wednesday 7 January ===
- The conclusion of the second round

Daryl Gurney 2–4 Martin Adams (1–3, 2–3, 3–2, 3–2, 2–3, 2–3)
John Walton 4–0 Mark Webster (3–1, 3–2, 3–0, 3–1)
Ted Hankey 4–1 Ross Montgomery (3–2, 3–0, 1–3, 3–1, 3–2)
Martin Atkins 1–4 Gary Robson (1–3, 1–3, 0–3, 3–1, 2–3)

Number three seed Martin Adams defeated Daryl Gurney 4–2. Adams had been 2–0 up before Gurney levelled the match at 2–2, but Adams edged each of the next two sets 3–2 to book his place in the quarters. 2001 World Champion John Walton knocked out the defending champion Mark Webster 4–0. Webster won four legs in the match. 2000 World Champion Ted Hankey saw off Scotland's Ross Montgomery 4–1 whilst number six seed Gary Robson saw off Martin Atkins 4–1.

=== Day Six, Thursday 8 January ===
==== Men's ====
- The quarter-finals in the top half of the draw

Gary Anderson 3–5 Tony O'Shea (2–3, 1–3, 2–3, 3–2, 0–3, 3–1, 3–2, 0–3)
Darryl Fitton 5–4 Scott Waites (3–2, 2–3, 2–3, 3–0, 2–3, 2–3, 3–1, 3–1, 3–1)

==== Women's ====
- The semi-finals

Karin Krappen 0–2 Trina Gulliver (1–3, 1–3)
Rilana Erades 0–2 Francis Hoenselaar (1–3, 1–3)

Tony O'Shea reached the semi-finals of the World Championships for the second time in his career as he beat the number one seed Gary Anderson 5–3. O'Shea went into a 4–1 lead before Anderson took the next two to make it 4–3. O'Shea took the next set for the win. Darryl Fitton came from 4–1 down to beat World Masters runner-up Scott Waites and set up a semi-final clash with fellow native of Stockport, O'Shea. In the women's championship, both Trina Gulliver and Francis Hoenselaar gained 2–0 wins to set up their sixth final against one another.

=== Day Seven, Friday 9 January ===
==== Men's ====
- The two remaining quarter-finals

John Walton 1–5 Ted Hankey (1–3, 1–3, 2–3, 0–3, 3–0, 1–3)
Gary Robson 4–5 Martin Adams (1–3, 1–3, 0–3, 3–1, 3–1, 3–0, 1–3, 3–2, 0–3)

==== Women's ====
- The final

Trina Gulliver 1–2 Francis Hoenselaar (2–3, 3–0, 0–3)

Former World Champion Ted Hankey saw off 2001 champion John Walton. Hankey beat Walton – who had only dropped five legs before the match – by five sets to one. Martin Adams gave up a 3–0 lead over Gary Robson, who made it 4–4, before the Masters champion won the final set 3–0 to complete a 5–4 win and set up a semi-final clash with Hankey. This meant that all four semi-finalists were 40 or older – the first time that this had ever occurred at a World Championship, in either organisation. (Hankey 40, Fitton 46, O'Shea 47 and Adams 52)

=== Day Eight, Saturday 10 January ===
- The semi-finals

Tony O'Shea 6–4 Darryl Fitton (2–3, 3–1, 0–3, 3–2, 3–1, 3–1, 3–0, 1–3, 2–3, 3–2)
Ted Hankey 6–4 Martin Adams (0–3, 3–2, 3–1, 2–3, 3–1, 1–3, 3–2, 3–2, 1–3, 3–1)

=== Day Nine, Sunday 11 January ===
- The final

Tony O'Shea 6–7 Ted Hankey (3–2, 1–3, 1–3, 0–3, 3–2, 1–3, 3–1, 1–3, 3–2, 0–3, 3–2, 3–2, 1–3)

== Television coverage ==
The tournament was again covered by the BBC in the UK. Coverage was presented by Ray Stubbs, with analysis from Bobby George and commentary from David Croft, Bobby George, Tony Green, and Ted Hankey. The tournament was also shown on SBS6 in the Netherlands and Eurosport across continental Europe.
