= Zoe Jones =

Zoe Jones may refer to:

- Zoe Jones (figure skater) (born 1980), British figure skater
- Zoe Jones (darts player) (born 1992), English darts player

== See also ==
- Zoe Lister-Jones (born 1982), American actress, singer, playwright, and screenwriter
