= Robert Hughes (darts player) =

Welsh darts player

Personal information
- Nickname: "Elvis"
- Born: 12 December 1966 (age 59) Cardiff, Wales
- Home town: Milford Haven, Wales

Sport
- Sport: Darts
- Playing since: 1988
- Darts: 22 Gram Bristows
- Laterality: Right-handed
- Walk-on music: "Burning Love" by Elvis Presley

Organisation (see split in darts)
- BDO: 1997–2016
- PDC: 2017–2018

WDF major events – best performances
- World Championship: Last 16: 2009
- World Masters: Last 16: 2006
- Int. Darts League: IDL Preliminary: 2007

Other tournament wins
- Tournament: Years
- Wales National Championships: 2005

Robert Hughes (born 12 December 1966) is a Welsh former professional darts player. He used the nickname "Elvis", after his favourite singer, Elvis Presley.

== Career ==
Hughes reached the quarter-finals of the 1997 Welsh Open and the 2000 British Open and then reached the semi-finals of the 2004 Welsh Open, where he beat Lee Palfreyman, Steve Smith and John Walton before losing to Tony West. Hughes then won the 2005 Wales National Championship, beating Mark Webster in the final.

Hughes reached the final of the 2006 BDO Gold Cup, losing to Gary Anderson. He then reached the quarter-finals of the 2006 WDF Europe Cup where he lost to Sweden's Göran Klemme. Hughes then reached the last 16 of the 2006 Winmau World Masters, defeating Ted Hankey before losing to Brian Woods.

A quarter final place in the Northern Ireland Open was Hughes' only credible run in 2007 which was a bad year, suffering early exits in the International Darts League, the World Masters and the BDO World Championship qualifiers. 2008 was Hughes' best year on the circuit, reaching the final of the Isle of Man Open, losing to Dave Chisnall. He then reached for semi finals of the Welsh Open, beating Scott Waites, Dave Prins and fellow Welshman Alan Walker before losing to Webster. He then reached the final of the Wales National Championship, losing to Liverpool's Robbie Green.

Hughes qualified for the 2009 Lakeside World Professional Darts Championship as one of the non-seeded players. He defeated 16th seed Eddy Sims 3–2 in the first round but lost 4–2 to number one seed Gary Anderson in the second round, despite taking a 2–1 lead in the match.

== World Championship results ==
=== BDO ===
- 2009: Last 16: (lost to Gary Anderson 2–4) (sets)
