= 2016 Malta Open darts =

Malta Open

Tournament information
- Dates: 15–17 November 2016
- Venue: Topaz Hotel
- Location: Buġibba
- Country: Malta
- Organisation(s): BDO, WDF, MDA
- Winner's share: €1,200

Champion(s)
- (England) Paul Williams

2016 Malta Open was a darts tournament part of the annual, Malta Open, which took place in Buġibba, Malta in 2016. Umit Uygunsozlu was the defending champion.

== Results ==
=== Men's Singles - Last 16 ===
Final 16
(Lithuania) | Labanauskas, Darius | 4
(England) | Colin Littlecott | 1
(England) | Williams, Paul | 4
(England) | Upton, Greg | 0
(Malta) | Attard, Norbert | 2
(Malta) | Keen, Andy | 4
(England) | Davis, Joe | 0
(England) | Van Cleff, Carlo | 4
(Belgium) | Wens, Sven | 1
(Malta) | Scerri, Albert | 4
(Netherlands) | Zander, Barry | 4
(England) | Jackson, Charlie | 2
(England) | Head, Sam | 3
(England) | Prins, Dave | 4
(England) | Stoner, Craig | 0
(England) | Hogan, Paul | 4

Quarter-finals
(Lithuania) | Labanauskas, Darius | 2
(England) | Williams, Paul | 4
(Malta) | Keen, Andy | 3
(Netherlands) | Van Cleff, Carlo | 4
(Malta) | Scerri, Albert | 4
(Netherlands) | Zander, Barry | 2
(England) | Prins, Dave | 4
(England) | Hogan, Paul | 2

Semi-finals
(England) | Williams, Paul | 5
(Netherlands) | Van Cleff, Carlo | 4
(Malta) | Scerri, Albert | 2
(England) | Prins, Dave | 5

Final
(England) | Williams, Paul | 6
(England) | Prins, Dave | 2

=== Ladies Singles ===
Player
(England) Winner - Readhead, Christine
(England) Runner Up - Kirkby, Kaz

=== Men's Pairs ===
Players
(Malta) Winners - N.Attard/D.Attard
(England) Runner Up - D.Prins/W.Halliwell

=== Ladies Pairs ===
Players
(England) Winners - L.Woodrow/S.Chick
(England) Runner Up - K.Bispham/K.Kirkby
