= 2009 Turkish Open darts =

Turkish Open

Tournament information
- Dates: October 25th, 2009
- Country: Turkey
- Organisation(s): BDO, WDF, ADO
- Winner's share: £2,000

Champion(s)
- (England) Tony O'Shea

2009 Turkish Open is a darts tournament, which took place in Turkey on October 25, 2009.

== Results ==
Final 16
(England)	Tony O'Shea	3
(England)	Peter Mitchell	0
(England)	Ross Smith	3
(England)	Dave Stokell	1
(England)	Dave Chisnall	3
(Wales)	John Roberts	1
(England)	Conan Whitehead	3
(Wales)	Martin Phillips	2
(England)	Dean Winstanley	3
(Turkey)	Emre Toros	1
(England)	Darryl Fitton	3
(England)	John Downs	1
(Wales)	Chris Harris	3
(England)	Brian Dawson	2
(England)	Andy Chalmers	3
(England)	Lewis McGurn	0

Quarter-finals
(England)	Tony O'Shea	4
(England)	Ross Smith	2
(England)	Dave Chisnall	4
(England)	Conan Whitehead	1
(England)	Dean Winstanley	4
(England)	Darryl Fitton	1
(Wales)	Chris Harris	4
(England)	Andy Chalmers	2

Semi-finals
(England)	Tony O'Shea	5
(England)	Dave Chisnall	3
(England)	Dean Winstanley	5
(Wales)	Chris Harris	0

Final
(England)	Tony O'Shea	6
(England)	Dean Winstanley	2
