= USA Darts Classic =

Darts tournament

The USA Darts Classic is a darts tournament that has been held since 2005.

== List of winners ==
=== Men's ===
| Year | Champion | Score | Runner-up | Total Prize Money | Champion | Runner-up |
|---|---|---|---|---|---|---|
| 1994 | (United States) Jim Widmayer | beat | (United States) David Fatum | ? | ? | ? |
| 1995 | (Canada) Avtar Gill | ?-? | (United States) Gerald Verrier | ? | ? | ? |
| 1996 | (United States) Jason Lucas | ?-? | (United States) Steve Brown | ? | ? | ? |
| 1997 | (United States) Gerome Vardaro | ?-? | (Singapore) Paul Lim | ? | ? | ? |
| 1998 | (United States) Sean Downs | ?-? | (Canada) Scott Cummings | ? | ? | ? |
| 1999 | (United States) Sean Downs | ?-? | (United States) Scott Wollaston | ? | ? | ? |
| 2000 | (Canada) John Part | ?-? | (United States) Dan Lauby | ? | ? | ? |
| 2001 | (United States) Luis Martinez | ?-? | (Canada) Gerry Convery | ? | ? | ? |
| 2002 | (United States) Ray Carver | ?-? | (United States) Steve Brown | ? | ? | ? |
| 2003 | (United States) John Kuczynski | ?-? | (United States) Doug Watkins | ? | ? | ? |
| 2004 | (United States) Darin Young | ?-? | (United States) Steve Hertzfeld | ? | ? | ? |
| 2005 | (United States) Darin Young | ?-? | (United States) Brad Wethington | ? | ? | ? |
| 2006 | (United States) David Marienthal | ?-? | (United States) Steve Brown | ? | ? | ? |
| 2007 | (United States) Larry Butler | ?-? | (United States) Brad Wethington | $2,280 | $600 | $300 |
| 2008 | (United States) Darin Young | ?-? | (United States) Jim Widmayer | ? | ? | ? |
| 2009 | (United States) Jerry van Loan | ?-? | (United States) Joseph Swick | $2,280 | $600 | $300 |
| 2010 | (United States) Larry Butler | ?-? | (United States) Jerry van Loan | $2,280 | $600 | $300 |
| 2011 | (Netherlands) Joey ten Berge | ?-? | (United States) Steve Panuncialman | $2,280 | $600 | $300 |
| 2012 | (United States) Darin Young | ?-? | (United States) Dieter Schutsch | $2,800 | $800 | $400 |
| 2013 | (United States) Leonard Gates | Beat | (United States) Jim Widmayer | $2,800 | | |
| 2014 | (United States) Leonard Gates | Beat | (United States) Joe Chaney | $2,800 | | |
| 2015 | (United States) Larry Butler | Beat | (United States) Toby Simko | $2,800 | | |
| 2016 | (United States) Tom Sawyer | Beat | (United States) Larry Butler | $2,800 | | |
| 2017 | (United States) Larry Butler | Beat | (United States) Avery Barry | $2,800 | | |
| 2018 | (United States) Patrick Kithi | beat | (United States) Chris White | | | |
| 2019 | (United States) Dan Lauby Jr | beat | (United States) Bruce Robbins | | | |
| 2021 | (United States) Jules van Dongen | 6–5 | (United States) Leonard Gates | | | |

=== Ladies ===
| Year | Champion | Score | Runner-up | Total Prize Money | Champion | Runner-up |
|---|---|---|---|---|---|---|
| 1994 | (England) Mandy Solomons | beat | (England) Deta Hedman | | | |
| 1995 | (England) Mandy Solomons | beat | (Wales) Sandra Greatbatch | | | |
