= Lithuania Open =

Tournament information
- Venue: Legenda Restaurant (2008); Reval Hotel (2009); Panorama Hotel (2010, 2017–2019, 2025); Trasalis Hotel (2011–2016); Žalgiris Arena (2022–2024)
- Location: Vilnius (2009–2010, 2017–2019, 2025); Trakai (2011–2016); Kaunas (2008, 2022–2024)
- Country: Lithuania
- Established: 2008
- Organisation(s): WDF
- Format: Legs
- Prize fund: €2,580
- Month(s) Played: May

Current champion(s)
- Thomas Skriver (men's); Kirsi Viinikainen (women's)

The Lithuania Open is a darts tournament organized by the Lithuania Darts Federation that has been held since 2008.

== List of tournaments ==
=== Men's ===
Year	Champion	Av.	Score	Runner-Up	Av.	Prize Money			Venue
Year	Champion	Av.	Score	Runner-Up	Av.	Total	Ch.	R.-Up	Venue
2008	(Lithuania) Darius Labanauskas	n/a	beat	(Lithuania) Tomas Šakys	n/a	LTL 2,300	LTL 1,000	LTL 500	Legenda Restaurant, Kaunas
2009	(Cyprus) Ermos Korradou	76.32	7 – 4	(Lithuania) Arūnas Čiplys	72.09	LTL 2,300	LTL 1,000	LTL 500	Reval Hotel, Vilnius
2010	(Lithuania) Arūnas Čiplys	66.57	6 – 4	(Norway) Stig-Jarle Knudsen	67.14	LTL 6,000	LTL 2,000	LTL 1,400	Panorama Hotel, Vilnius
2011	(Lithuania) Darius Labanauskas (2)	69.27	6 – 4	(Lithuania) Tomas Šakys	65.52	LTL 6,000	LTL 2,000	LTL 1,400	Trasalis Hotel, Trakai
2012	(Netherlands) Jimmy Hendriks	81.36	6 – 4	(Netherlands) Willy van de Wiel	80.79	LTL 6,000	LTL 2,000	LTL 1,400	Trasalis Hotel, Trakai
2013	(Lithuania) Darius Labanauskas (3)	88.26	6 – 3	(Scotland) Paul Coughlin	81.18	LTL 6,000	LTL 2,000	LTL 1,400	Trasalis Hotel, Trakai
2014	(Latvia) Madars Razma	83.55	6 – 2	(England) Matt Dickinson	73.71	LTL 3,100	LTL 1,400	LTL 700	Trasalis Hotel, Trakai
2015	(Lithuania) Darius Labanauskas (4)	84.75	5 – 1	(Sweden) Peter Sajwani	65.46	€900	€400	€200	Trasalis Hotel, Trakai
2016	(Lithuania) Darius Labanauskas (5)	87.72	6 – 5	(Latvia) Madars Razma	83.67	€900	€400	€200	Trasalis Hotel, Trakai
2017	(Sweden) Dennis Nilsson	n/a	6 – 0	(Latvia) Aigars Strēlis	n/a	€900	€400	€200	Panorama Hotel, Vilnius
2018	(Lithuania) Darius Labanauskas (6)	n/a	6 – 3	(Denmark) Brian Løkken	n/a	€1,150	€500	€250	Panorama Hotel, Vilnius
2019	(England) Martin Barratt	n/a	6 – 3	Alexander Merkx	n/a	€1,700	€500	€250	Panorama Hotel, Vilnius
2022	Alexander Merkx	84.96	5 – 1	Aaron Turner	69.44	€1,700	€500	€250	Žalgiris Arena, Kaunas
2023	John Scott	69.98	5 – 1	Davy van der Zande	56.88	€1,700	€500	€250	Žalgiris Arena, Kaunas
2024	Matt Dickinson	80.21	5 – 4	Ralfs Laumanis	81.75	€1,700	€500	€250	Žalgiris Arena, Kaunas
2025	Thomas Skriver	89.75	6 – 5	Jimmy van Schie	92.46	€1,820	€600	€300	Panorama Hotel, Vilnius

=== Women's ===
Year	Champion	Av.	Score	Runner-Up	Av.	Prize Money			Venue
Year	Champion	Av.	Score	Runner-Up	Av.	Total	Ch.	R.-Up	Venue
2008	(Latvia) Areta Kovalevska	n/a	beat	(Latvia) Biruta Skvirecka	n/a	n/a	n/a	n/a	Legenda Restaurant, Kaunas
2009	(Lithuania) Rytė Banaitienė	54.15	4 – 0	(Lithuania) Erika Bagdonavičienė	44.22	n/a	n/a	n/a	Reval Hotel, Vilnius
2010	(Lithuania) Erika Bagdonavičienė	n/a	4 – 3	(Lithuania) Rytė Banaitienė	n/a	n/a	n/a	n/a	Panorama Hotel, Vilnius
2011	(Lithuania) Erika Bagdonavičienė (2)	50.94	4 – 1	(Finland) Maret Liiri	53.97	n/a	n/a	n/a	Trasalis Hotel, Trakai
2012	(Finland) Lumi Silvan	n/a	4 – 2	(Finland) Maret Liiri	n/a	n/a	n/a	n/a	Trasalis Hotel, Trakai
2013	(Germany) Irina Armstrong	76.65	5 – 3	(Finland) Lumi Silvan	63.66	n/a	n/a	n/a	Trasalis Hotel, Trakai
2014	(Finland) Lumi Silvan (2)	68.73	4 – 1	(Lithuania) Kornelija Lušaitė	60.81	n/a	n/a	n/a	Trasalis Hotel, Trakai
2015	(England) Amanda Harwood	50.94	5 – 1	(Lithuania) Renata Vaikutienė	46.17	€400	€200	€100	Trasalis Hotel, Trakai
2016	(Finland) Maret Liiri	n/a	4 – 1	(England) Judith Morrison	n/a	€400	€200	€100	Trasalis Hotel, Trakai
2017	(England) Amanda Harwood (2)	n/a	5 – 4	(Finland) Maret Liiri	n/a	€400	€200	€100	Panorama Hotel, Vilnius
2018	(Sweden) Heléne Sundelin	n/a	5 – 4	(Romania) Oana Bîrsan	n/a	€475	€250	€125	Panorama Hotel, Vilnius
2019	(Finland) Kirsi Viinikainen	n/a	5 – 2	(Sweden) Heléne Sundelin	n/a	€725	€250	€125	Panorama Hotel, Vilnius
2022	Margaret Sutton	39.52	5 – 2	(Lithuania) Egle Galdikaite	34.43	€725	€250	€125	Žalgiris Arena, Kaunas
2023	Margaret Sutton (2)	57.09	4 – 1	(Sweden) Heléne Sundelin	53.43	€725	€250	€125	Žalgiris Arena, Kaunas
2024	(Hungary) Gréta Tekauer	75.11	5 – 2	(Lithuania) Sandra Rimkevičiūtė	67.43	€725	€250	€125	Žalgiris Arena, Kaunas
2025	(Finland) Kirsi Viinikainen (2)	69.82	6 – 2	(Finland) Anu Rasmus	64.39	€760	€300	€150	Panorama Hotel, Vilnius

== Tournament records ==
Men's

- Most wins 6: (Lithuania) Darius Labanauskas
- Most Finals 6: (Lithuania) Darius Labanauskas
- Most Semi Finals 6: (Lithuania) Darius Labanauskas
- Most Quarter Finals 6: (Lithuania) Darius Labanauskas
- Most Appearances 10: (Lithuania) Darius Labanauskas
- Most Prize Money won €1828.23: (Lithuania) Darius Labanauskas
- Best winning average (103.74) : (Latvia) Madars Razma v's (Lithuania) Darius Labanauskas, 2014, Semi Final
- Youngest Winner age 18: (Netherlands) Jimmy Hendriks
- Oldest Winner age 42: (England) John Scott
