= Eddy Sims =

Australian darts player (born 1971)

Personal information
- Nickname: "Simsy"
- Born: 2 December 1971 (age 54) Geelong, Australia
- Home town: Melbourne, Australia

Sport
- Sport: Darts
- Playing since: 1994
- Darts: 22 Gram Phil Taylor Signature Darts
- Laterality: Right-handed
- Walk-on music: "Thunderstruck" by AC/DC

Organisation (see split in darts)
- BDO: 2005–2016

WDF major events – best performances
- World Championship: Last 32: 2009
- World Masters: Last 128: 2014
- World Trophy: Last 32: 2015

Other tournament wins
- Years
Australian Ch'ship	2013, 2014
Australian Masters	2008
Victorian Easter Open	2009
DFA Geelong Open	2011
New South Wales Open	2014
Medal record
Men's Darts
Representing Australia
WDF Asia-Pacific Cup
Gold medal – first place	2008 Palmerston	Team event
Gold medal – first place	2014 Hong Kong	Men's pairs
Bronze medal – third place	2014 Hong Kong	Team event

Eddy Sims (born 2 December 1971) is an Australian former professional darts player.

== Career ==
Sims began playing in WDF ranked events in 2006, mainly playing in events based in his homeland. He reached the quarter-finals of the Pacific Masters in 2006 and 2007 and followed it up by reaching the final of the 2007 Australian Masters where he lost to Simon Whitlock.

Sims made three ranked semi final appearances in 2008, in the Pacific Masters, Malaysian Open and the New Zealand Masters. He had earlier reached the semi-finals of the Central Coast Australian Classic, an unranked event. Sims then won the 2008 Australian Masters, defeating Adam Bainbridge 8–1 in the final.

His good performances in 2008 earned Sims automatic qualification for the 2009 BDO World Darts Championship, entering as the number 16 seed. He was drawn with Welshman Robert Hughes in the first round and lost 3–2.

Sims his second staged of the 2015 BDO World Darts Championship, he was losing with Belgium's Cedric Waegemans in the preliminary round by 3–1.

== World Championship performances results ==
=== BDO ===
- 2009: Last 32: (lost to Robert Hughes 2–3) (sets)
- 2015: Last 40: (lost to Cedric Waegemans 1–3)

== Personal life ==
Sims is not a full-time professional and works as a Telecommunication Technical Officer.
