= Baltic Cup Open =

Darts tournament held between players from Baltic states

Baltic Cup

Tournament information
- Venue: Various
- Location: Various
- Country: Estonia; Lithuania; Latvia
- Established: 2007
- Organisation(s): WDF
- Format: Legs
- Prize fund: €6,580

Current champion(s)
- (Estonia) Andres Paal (men's) (Latvia) Sarmite Lavrentjeva (women's)

The Baltic Cup Open is a darts tournament that is held from 2007.

== List of tournaments ==
=== Men's ===
Year	Champion	Av.	Score	Runner-Up	Av.	Prize Money			Venue
Year	Champion	Av.	Score	Runner-Up	Av.	Total	Ch.	R.-Up	Venue
2007	(Lithuania) Arvydas Kvedaras	n/a	4 – 3	(Lithuania) Gintaras Nagevius	n/a	—	—	—	(Latvia) Maritim Park Hotel, Riga
2008	(Latvia) Arnis Vents	n/a	4 – 3	(Lithuania) Arūnas Čiplys	n/a	—	—	—	(Latvia) Maritim Park Hotel, Riga
2009	(Lithuania) Gintaris Armalis	n/a	3 – 2	(Lithuania) Tomas Šakys	n/a	—	—	—	(Latvia) Riga NB Hotel, Riga
2010	(Lithuania) Arūnas Čiplys	70.26	4 – 2	(Estonia) Meelis Aule	n/a	—	—	—	(Lithuania) Trasalis Hotel, Trakai
2011	(Lithuania) Arūnas Čiplys (2)	n/a	4 – 1	Madars Razma	n/a	—	—	—	(Latvia) Maritim Park Hotel, Riga
2012	Rowby-John Rodriguez	92.49	4 – 0	Madars Razma	83.70	—	—	—	(Estonia) Villa Andropoff, Parnumaa
2013	Darius Labanauskas	86.94	4 – 3	(Lithuania) Arūnas Čiplys	88.32	—	—	—	(Lithuania) Trasalis Hotel, Trakai
2014	Madars Razma	n/a	4 – 2	Darius Labanauskas	n/a	—	—	—	(Latvia) Maritim Park Hotel, Riga
2015	(Faroe Islands) John Imrie	n/a	4 – 2	(Scotland) Dennis Watt	n/a	—	—	—	(Estonia) Villa Andropoff, Parnumaa
2016	Dennis Nilsson	83.40	5 – 2	(Sweden) Ricky Nauman	78.51	—	—	—	(Lithuania) Trasalis Hotel, Trakai
2017	Darius Labanauskas (2)	91.65	6 – 3	Mindaugas Barauskas	58.69	—	—	—	(Latvia) Bellevue Park Hotel, Riga
2018	(England) Matt Dickinson	n/a	5 – 1	(Latvia) Aivars Šutka	n/a	—	—	—	(Estonia) Villa Andropoff, Parnumaa
2019	(Russia) Evgeni Izotov	n/a	5 – 4	Mindaugas Barauskas	n/a	—	—	—	(Lithuania) Trasalis Hotel, Trakai
2020	(Estonia) Andres Paal	n/a	5 – 3	(Latvia) Kristaps Mickus	n/a	—	—	—	(Latvia) Bellevue Park Hotel, Riga

=== Women's ===
Year	Champion	Av.	Score	Runner-Up	Av.	Prize Money			Venue
Year	Champion	Av.	Score	Runner-Up	Av.	Total	Ch.	R.-Up	Venue
2007	(Latvia) Zeltite Putnina	n/a	4 – 1	(Lithuania) Vilma Armaliene	n/a	—	—	—	(Latvia) Maritim Park Hotel, Riga
2008	(Latvia) Ieva Brikmane	n/a	3 – 2	(Latvia) Zeltite Putnina	n/a	—	—	—	(Latvia) Maritim Park Hotel, Riga
2009	(Lithuania) Ryte Banatiene	n/a	3 – 0	(Latvia) Natalija Zelenika	n/a	—	—	—	(Latvia) Riga NB Hotel, Riga
2010	(Latvia) Areta Kovalevska	70.26	4 – 3	(Latvia) Biruta Skvirecka	n/a	—	—	—	(Lithuania) Trasalis Hotel, Trakai
2011	(Latvia) Avelina Lace	n/a	4 – 1	(Latvia) Sarmite Lavrentjeva	n/a	—	—	—	(Latvia) Maritim Park Hotel, Riga
2012	(Finland) Maret Liiri	51.30	4 – 3	(Latvia) Zeltite Strade	46.83	—	—	—	(Estonia) Villa Andropoff, Parnumaa
2013	(Finland) Kirsi Viinikainen	n/a	4 – 2	(Finland) Maret Liiri	n/a	—	—	—	(Lithuania) Trasalis Hotel, Trakai
2014	(Finland) Lumi Silvan	n/a	4 – 1	(Lithuania) Kornelija Lusaite	n/a	—	—	—	(Latvia) Maritim Park Hotel, Riga
2015	(Latvia) Sarmite Lavrentjeva	53.82	4 – 2	(Russia) Liza Pugina	55.50	—	—	—	(Estonia) Villa Andropoff, Parnumaa
2016	(Norway) Ramona Eriksen	65.46	4 – 1	(Russia) Tatiana Novikova	54.93	—	—	—	(Lithuania) Trasalis Hotel, Trakai
2017	(Latvia) Anda Seimane	47.54	5 – 3	(Lithuania) Algina Juknaite	49.82	—	—	—	(Latvia) Bellevue Park Hotel, Riga
2018	(England) Annette Lord	n/a	5 – 1	(Latvia) Zeltite Strade	n/a	—	—	—	(Estonia) Villa Andropoff, Parnumaa
2019	(Lithuania) Kornelija Lusaite	n/a	5 – 3	(Lithuania) Sandra Rimkeviciute	n/a	—	—	—	(Lithuania) Trasalis Hotel, Trakai
2020	(Latvia) Sarmite Lavrentjeva (2)	n/a	5 – 3	(Latvia) Kristine Mickus	n/a	—	—	—	(Latvia) Bellevue Park Hotel, Riga

== Tournament records ==
- Most wins 2: . (Lithuania) Arūnas Čiplys, Darius Labanauskas
- Most Finals 4: (Lithuania) Arūnas Čiplys
- Most Semi Finals 5: (Lithuania) Arūnas Čiplys
- Most Quarter Finals 6: (Lithuania) Arūnas Čiplys
- Most Appearances 7: (Lithuania) Arūnas Čiplys
- Youngest Winner age 18: (Austria) Rowby-John Rodriguez
- Oldest Winner age 41: Darius Labanauskas

== See also ==
- List of BDO ranked tournaments
- List of WDF tournaments
