= 2010 Turkish Open darts =

Turkish Open

Tournament information
- Dates: October 24th, 2010
- Country: Turkey
- Organisation(s): BDO, WDF, ADO
- Winner's share: £2,200

Champion(s)
- (England) Scott Waites

2010 Turkish Open is a darts tournament, which took place in Turkey on October 24, 2010.

== Results ==
Final 32
(England)	Scott Waites	4
(England)	Antony Harding	0
(England)	Jimmy Withers	4
(Romania)	Vlad Cristian Popa	2
(England)	Darryl Fitton	4
(Belgium)	Gino Dierckx	0
(Cyprus)	Cemal Gingi	4
(England)	Vincent Mullineaux	3
(Wales)	Wayne Warren	4
(Turkey)	Muhittin Gurbiz	0
(England)	Thomas Chaters	4
(Estonia)	Mati Leis	1
(England)	Andy Chalmers	4
(England)	Tony Burrows	0
(England)	Tony Green	4
(Belgium)	Rudy Verbeke	3
(England)	Paul Williams	4
(Iran)	Esmaill Ashoovi	2
(England)	Tony O'Shea	4
(Wales)	Aled Jones	1
(England)	Brian Dawson	4
(Poland)	Marek Kubowicz	1
(Netherlands)	Jermaine Wattimena	4
(England)	Jamie Martin	1
(England)	Kevin Weir	4
(Belgium)	Kurt van de Rijck	2
(England)	John Walton	4
(Finland)	Vesa Nuutinen	1
(England)	John Downs	4
(England)	Jimmy Noone	0
(Wales)	Martin Phillips	4
(Belgium)	Luc Dierckx	3

Final 16
(England)	Scott Waites	4
(England)	Jimmy Withers	0
(England)	Darryl Fitton	4
(Cyprus)	Cemal Gingi	0
(Wales)	Wayne Warren	4
(England)	Thomas Chaters	0
(England)	Andy Chalmers	4
(England)	Tony Green	0
(England)	Paul Williams	4
(England)	Tony O'Shea	3
(England)	Brian Dawson	4
(Netherlands)	Jermaine Wattimena	1
(England)	Kevin Weir	4
(England)	John Walton	3
(England)	John Downs	4
(Wales)	Martin Phillips	3

Quarter-finals
(England)	Scott Waites	4
(England)	Darryl Fitton	1
(Wales)	Wayne Warren	4
(England)	Andy Chalmers	1
(England)	Paul Williams	4
(England)	Brian Dawson	0
(England)	Kevin Weir	4
(England)	John Downs	3

Semi-finals
(England)	Scott Waites	5
(Wales)	Wayne Warren	2
(England)	Paul Williams	5
(England)	Kevin Weir	4

Final
(England)	Scott Waites	6
(England)	Paul Williams	1
