= Swiss Open (darts) =

Tournament information
- Venue: Altes Kraftwerk
- Location: Basel
- Country: Switzerland
- Established: 1984
- Organisation(s): WDF
- Format: Legs
- Prize fund: €8,000
- Month(s) Played: June

Current champion(s)
- Michael Unterbuchner (Men); Sophie McKinlay (Women); Benjamin Dopfer (Youth)

The Swiss Open is a darts tournament that has been held since 1984 in Basel. It was held in Lausen from 2007 to 2016 and in Zurich from 2017 to 2019.

== List of tournaments ==
=== Men's ===
Year	Champion	Av.	Score	Runner-Up	Av.	Prize Money			Venue
Year	Champion	Av.	Score	Runner-Up	Av.	Total	Ch.	R.-Up	Venue
1984	(Switzerland) Stefan Paracka	n/a	beat	(Switzerland) Rene Muller	n/a	n/a	n/a	n/a	Rialto Restaurant, Basel
1985	(Belgium) Willy Logie	n/a	beat	(Germany) Colin Rice	n/a	n/a	n/a	n/a	MUBA Festsaal, Basel
1986	(Belgium) Frans Devooght	n/a	beat	(Belgium) Jean-Pierre Samijn	n/a	n/a	n/a	n/a	MUBA Festsaal, Basel
1987	(England) Peter Evison	n/a	beat	(England) Don Dillon	n/a	n/a	n/a	n/a	MUBA Festsaal, Basel
1988	(England) Simon Duke	n/a	beat	(England) Dave Askew	n/a	n/a	n/a	n/a	MUBA Festsaal, Basel
1989	(England) Andy Waugh	n/a	beat	(England) Kevin Burrows	n/a	n/a	n/a	n/a	MUBA Festsaal, Basel
1990	(United States) Steve Brown	n/a	beat	(South Africa) Hennie Morton	n/a	n/a	n/a	n/a	MUBA Festsaal, Basel
1991	(United States) Steve Brown (2)	n/a	3 – 2	(England) Rod Harrington	n/a	n/a	n/a	n/a	MUBA Festsaal, Basel
1992	(United States) Dieter Schutsch	n/a	3 – 0	(Netherlands) Bert Vlaardingerbroek	n/a	n/a	n/a	n/a	MUBA Festsaal, Basel
1993	(Denmark) Per Skau	n/a	beat	(Belgium) Leo Laurens	n/a	n/a	n/a	n/a	MUBA Festsaal, Basel
1994	(England) Andy Fordham	n/a	beat	(England) Colin Monk	n/a	n/a	n/a	n/a	MUBA Festsaal, Basel
1995	(England) Mike Gregory	n/a	3 – 1	(England) Andy Fordham	n/a	n/a	n/a	n/a	MUBA Festsaal, Basel
1996	(England) Martin Adams	n/a	3 – 2	(England) Andy Jenkins	n/a	n/a	n/a	n/a	MUBA Festsaal, Basel
1997	(England) Ronnie Baxter	n/a	3 – 2	(Wales) Sean Palfrey	n/a	n/a	n/a	n/a	MUBA Festsaal, Basel
1998	(England) Rod Harrington	n/a	3 – 2	(England) Andy Smith	n/a	n/a	n/a	n/a	Saalbau Rhypark, Basel
1999	(England) Martin Adams (2)	n/a	3 – 1	(England) Kevin Painter	n/a	n/a	n/a	n/a	Saalbau Rhypark, Basel
2000	(Netherlands) Raymond van Barneveld	n/a	3 – 0	(England) Nick Gedney	n/a	n/a	n/a	n/a	Saalbau Rhypark, Basel
2001	(England) Andy Jenkins	n/a	3 – 1	(England) Peter Manley	n/a	n/a	n/a	n/a	Saalbau Rhypark, Basel
2002	(England) James Wade	91.80	3 – 2	(England) Colin Monk	89.82	n/a	n/a	n/a	Saalbau Rhypark, Basel
2003	(England) Tony O'Shea	84.96	2 – 1	(England) Tony West	80.16	n/a	n/a	n/a	Saalbau Rhypark, Basel
2004	(England) Tony West	n/a	2 – 1	(Netherlands) Raymond van Barneveld	n/a	CHF 7,900	CHF 3,000	CHF 1,500	Saalbau Rhypark, Basel
2005	(England) Mervyn King	n/a	2 – 1	(England) Martin Atkins	n/a	CHF 6,880	CHF 3,000	CHF 1,400	L'Entree, Basel
2006	(Scotland) Gary Anderson	101.46	3 – 1	(Netherlands) Michael van Gerwen	104.31	CHF 6,880	CHF 3,000	CHF 1,400	L'Entree, Basel
2007	(Netherlands) Co Stompé	97.32	3 – 1	(Netherlands) Edwin Max	95.82	CHF 6,880	CHF 3,000	CHF 1,400	MZH Stutz, Lausen
2008	(Netherlands) Joey ten Berge	92.22	3 – 2	(England) Dave Prins	84.72	CHF 6,880	CHF 3,000	CHF 1,400	MZH Stutz, Lausen
2009	(England) Scott Mitchell	93.57	3 – 0	(England) Paul Carter	84.39	CHF 6,880	CHF 3,000	CHF 1,400	MZH Stutz, Lausen
2010	(England) Scott Mitchell (2)	86.49	3 – 1	(Netherlands) Fabian Roosenbrand	88.89	CHF 7,400	CHF 3,600	CHF 1,400	MZH Stutz, Lausen
2011	(England) Paul Jennings	81.48	2 – 1	(Netherlands) Christian Kist	87.81	CHF 7,480	CHF 3,600	CHF 1,400	MZH Stutz, Lausen
2012	(Netherlands) Wesley Harms	99.72	3 – 1	(Belgium) Geert de Vos	90.30	CHF 6,880	CHF 3,000	CHF 1,400	MZH Stutz, Lausen
2013	(Netherlands) Remco van Eijden	93.51	2 – 1	(Belgium) Geert de Vos	90.63	CHF 6,880	CHF 3,000	CHF 1,400	MZH Stutz, Lausen
2014	(Netherlands) Remco van Eijden (2)	93.12	2 – 0	(Belgium) Stefaan Deprez	87.24	CHF 6,880	CHF 3,000	CHF 1,400	MZH Stutz, Lausen
2015	(England) Dave Prins	89.10	3 – 1	(England) James Hurrell	65.46	CHF 6,880	CHF 3,000	CHF 1,400	MZH Stutz, Lausen
2016	(Netherlands) Jeffrey Sparidaans	90.36	3 – 1	(Belgium) Geert De Vos	83.37	CHF 7,940	CHF 3,000	CHF 1,500	MZH Stutz, Lausen
2017	(Wales) Jim Williams	97.95	3 – 1	(England) Mark McGeeney	93.45	CHF 7,300	CHF 2,700	CHF 1,200	Chliriethalle, Zürich
2018	(Germany) Michael Unterbuchner	86.91	3 – 0	(Catalonia) Martín Martí	83.37	CHF 7,300	CHF 2,700	CHF 1,200	Chliriethalle, Zürich
2019	Thomas Junghans	89.52	3 – 2	Dennie Olde Kalter	84.60	CHF 7,000	CHF 2,500	CHF 1,100	Chliriethalle, Zürich
2022	Gábor Takács	78.87	5 – 2	Martyn Turner	77.61	CHF 5,600	CHF 1,600	CHF 800	Altes Kraftwerk, Basel
2023	Liam Maendl-Lawrance	82.82	5 – 1	Aaron Turner	71.33	CHF 5,600	CHF 1,600	CHF 800	Sporthalle Ruebisbach, Kloten
2024	(Netherlands) Jimmy van Schie	N/A	5 – 3	(England) Darren Johnson	N/A	CHF 5,600	CHF 1,600	CHF 800	Sporthalle Ruebisbach, Kloten

=== Women's ===
Year	Champion	Av.	Score	Runner-Up	Av.	Prize Money			Venue
Year	Champion	Av.	Score	Runner-Up	Av.	Total	Ch.	R.-Up	Venue
1984	(Switzerland) Madeleine Borter	n/a	beat	(Germany) Karen Alexander	n/a	n/a	n/a	n/a	Rialto Restaurant, Basel
1985	(Switzerland) Eva Barnieske	n/a	beat	(Switzerland) Susi Buchi	n/a	n/a	n/a	n/a	MUBA Festsaal, Basel
1986	(England) Sonja Ralphs	n/a	beat	(Netherlands) Mia Mevissen	n/a	n/a	n/a	n/a	MUBA Festsaal, Basel
1987	(Germany) Gaby Kosuch	n/a	beat	(Netherlands) Mia Mevissen	n/a	n/a	n/a	n/a	MUBA Festsaal, Basel
1988	(England) Sharon Colclough	n/a	beat	(Germany) Andrea Knopp	n/a	n/a	n/a	n/a	MUBA Festsaal, Basel
1989	(England) Deta Hedman	n/a	beat	(Netherlands) Valerie Maytum	n/a	n/a	n/a	n/a	MUBA Festsaal, Basel
1990	(England) Mandy Solomons	n/a	beat	(England) Sharon Colclough	n/a	n/a	n/a	n/a	MUBA Festsaal, Basel
1991	(England) Deta Hedman (2)	n/a	beat	(England) Sharon Colclough	n/a	n/a	n/a	n/a	MUBA Festsaal, Basel
1992	(England) Deta Hedman (3)	n/a	beat	(England) Mandy Solomons	n/a	n/a	n/a	n/a	MUBA Festsaal, Basel
1993	(England) Mandy Solomons (2)	n/a	beat	(England) Deta Hedman	n/a	n/a	n/a	n/a	MUBA Festsaal, Basel
1994	(Netherlands) Francis Hoenselaar	n/a	beat	(England) Deta Hedman	n/a	n/a	n/a	n/a	MUBA Festsaal, Basel
1995	(Netherlands) Francis Hoenselaar (2)	n/a	beat	(England) Deta Hedman	n/a	n/a	n/a	n/a	MUBA Festsaal, Basel
1996	(England) Deta Hedman (4)	n/a	4 – 1	(Netherlands) Francis Hoenselaar	n/a	n/a	n/a	n/a	MUBA Festsaal, Basel
1997	(England) Trina Gulliver	n/a	beat	(Finland) Tarja Salminen	n/a	n/a	n/a	n/a	MUBA Festsaal, Basel
1998	(England) Trina Gulliver (2)	n/a	2 – 0	(Belgium) Sandra Pollet	n/a	n/a	n/a	n/a	Saalbau Rhypark, Basel
1999	(Finland) Tarja Salminen	n/a	beat	(England) Trina Gulliver	n/a	n/a	n/a	n/a	Saalbau Rhypark, Basel
2000	(England) Crissy Manley	n/a	2 – 1	(Belgium) Sandra Pollet	n/a	n/a	n/a	n/a	Saalbau Rhypark, Basel
2001	(Netherlands) Francis Hoenselaar (3)	n/a	2 – 0	(Netherlands) Mieke de Boer	n/a	n/a	n/a	n/a	Saalbau Rhypark, Basel
2002	(England) Crissy Manley (2)	69.18	2 – 0	(Netherlands) Mieke de Boer	66.69	n/a	n/a	n/a	Saalbau Rhypark, Basel
2003	(Netherlands) Francis Hoenselaar (4)	n/a	beat	(England) Trina Gulliver	n/a	n/a	n/a	n/a	Saalbau Rhypark, Basel
2004	(Netherlands) Francis Hoenselaar (5)	n/a	beat	(Netherlands) Karin Krappen	n/a	n/a	n/a	n/a	Saalbau Rhypark, Basel
2005	(Netherlands) Francis Hoenselaar (6)	n/a	beat	(Netherlands) Karin Krappen	n/a	n/a	n/a	n/a	L'Entree, Basel
2006	(England) Trina Gulliver (3)	82.35	2 – 0	(Netherlands) Karin Krappen	62.64	n/a	n/a	n/a	L'Entree, Basel
2007	(England) Tricia Wright	78.45	2 – 1	(Germany) Irina Armstrong	73.29	n/a	n/a	n/a	MZH Stutz, Lausen
2008	(Netherlands) Carla Molema	71.73	2 – 1	(Germany) Irina Armstrong	68.61	n/a	n/a	n/a	MZH Stutz, Lausen
2009	(England) Tricia Wright (2)	79.38	2 – 0	(Germany) Irina Armstrong	79.68	n/a	n/a	n/a	MZH Stutz, Lausen
2010	(Germany) Irina Armstrong	82.32	2 – 1	(England) Deta Hedman	77.67	n/a	n/a	n/a	MZH Stutz, Lausen
2011	(Germany) Irina Armstrong (2)	63.87	2 – 0	(Switzerland) Fiona Gaylor	61.59	n/a	n/a	n/a	MZH Stutz, Lausen
2012	(England) Deta Hedman (5)	82.26	2 – 0	(Norway) Tamara Schuur	69.00	n/a	n/a	n/a	MZH Stutz, Lausen
2013	(Germany) Irina Armstrong (3)	n/a	2 – 0	(Germany) Steffi Luck	n/a	n/a	n/a	n/a	MZH Stutz, Lausen
2014	(Netherlands) Aileen de Graaf	n/a	2 – 0	(England) Deta Hedman	n/a	n/a	n/a	n/a	MZH Stutz, Lausen
2015	(Denmark) Ann-Louise Peters	n/a	2 – 0	(Netherlands) Danielle Ijpelaar	n/a	n/a	n/a	n/a	MZH Stutz, Lausen
2016	(England) Deta Hedman (6)	79.02	2 – 1	(Netherlands) Aileen de Graaf	78.57	n/a	n/a	n/a	MZH Stutz, Lausen
2017	(England) Fallon Sherrock	72.51	2 – 0	(Netherlands) Anca Zijlstra	66.15	n/a	n/a	n/a	Chliriethalle, Zürich
2018	(England) Fallon Sherrock (2)	n/a	2 – 1	(England) Deta Hedman	n/a	n/a	n/a	n/a	Chliriethalle, Zürich
2019	Deta Hedman (7)	74.34	2 – 1	Laura Turner	73.41	n/a	n/a	n/a	Chliriethalle, Zürich
2022	Anca Zijlstra	59.07	5 – 4	Suzanne Smith	62.61	CHF 2,400	CHF 800	CHF 400	Altes Kraftwerk, Basel
2023	Rhian O'Sullivan	64.69	5 – 1	Sylvia Schlapbach	61.55	CHF 2,400	CHF 800	CHF 400	Sporthalle Ruebisbach, Kloten
2024	Lisa Ashton	N/A	5 – 3	Irina Armstrong	N/A	CHF 2,400	CHF 800	CHF 400	Sporthalle Ruebisbach, Kloten

=== Youth's ===
Year	Champion	Av.	Score	Runner-Up	Av.	Prize Money			Venue
Year	Champion	Av.	Score	Runner-Up	Av.	Total	Ch.	R.-Up	Venue
2012	(Germany) Niclas Grabowski	n/a	beat	(Switzerland) Roman Loeffel	n/a	n/a	n/a	n/a	MZH Stutz, Lausen
2013	(England) Nathan Street	n/a	beat	(Switzerland) Felix Schiertz	n/a	n/a	n/a	n/a	MZH Stutz, Lausen
2014	(Netherlands) Javanico Jansen	n/a	beat	(Netherlands) Jesper Nijman	n/a	n/a	n/a	n/a	MZH Stutz, Lausen
2015	(Netherlands) Maikel Verberk	n/a	beat	(Netherlands) Levy Frauenfelder	n/a	n/a	n/a	n/a	MZH Stutz, Lausen
2016	(Austria) Rusty-Jake Rodriguez	n/a	beat	(Germany) Jan Schlemmer	n/a	n/a	n/a	n/a	MZH Stutz, Lausen
2017	(Netherlands) Wessel Nijman	n/a	beat	(China) Yang Yu	n/a	n/a	n/a	n/a	Chliriethalle, Zürich
2018	(Austria) Marcel Steinacher	n/a	beat	(Austria) Thomas Langer	n/a	n/a	n/a	n/a	Chliriethalle, Zürich
2019	(Bosnia and Herzegovina) Emir Mujanovic	n/a	beat	(England) Maison Wilson	n/a	n/a	n/a	n/a	Chliriethalle, Zürich
2022	Quentin Glass	64.14	4 – 0	Loris Schaub	48.69	CHF 400	CHF 200	CHF 100	Altes Kraftwerk, Basel
2023	Adam Dee	83.94	4 – 2	Robbie Curan	72.26	CHF 400	CHF 200	CHF 100	Sporthalle Ruebisbach, Kloten
2024	Jenson Walker	91.47	4 – 3	Luca Sutalo	85.44	CHF 400	CHF 200	CHF 100	Sporthalle Ruebisbach, Kloten

== Records and statistics ==
=== Tournament records ===
- Most wins 2: (England) Martin Adams, (Netherlands) Raymond van Barneveld, (United States) Steve Brown, (Netherlands) Remco van Eijden.
- Most Finals 2: by 12 players.
- Most Semi Finals 4: (Netherlands) Raymond van Barneveld.
- Most Quarter Finals 6: (Netherlands) Raymond van Barneveld, (Netherlands) Co Stompé.
- Most Appearances 9: (England) Martin Atkins.
- Most Prize Money won CHF 5,697: (England) Scott Mitchell.
- Best winning average (107.34) : (Netherlands) Joey ten Berge v's (Netherlands) Edwin Max, 2008, Semi Final.
- Youngest Winner age 19: (England) James Wade.
- Oldest Winner age 46: (England) Dave Prins.

=== Nine-dart finishes ===
Player	Year (+ Round)	Method (single-in double-out)	Opponent	Result
(England) Graeme Stoddart	2000, Group stage	3 x T20; 3 x T20; T20, T19, D12	(England) Ian Eames	n/a

== See also ==
- List of BDO ranked tournaments
- List of WDF tournaments
