= Jamie Hughes (darts player) =

English darts player (born 1986

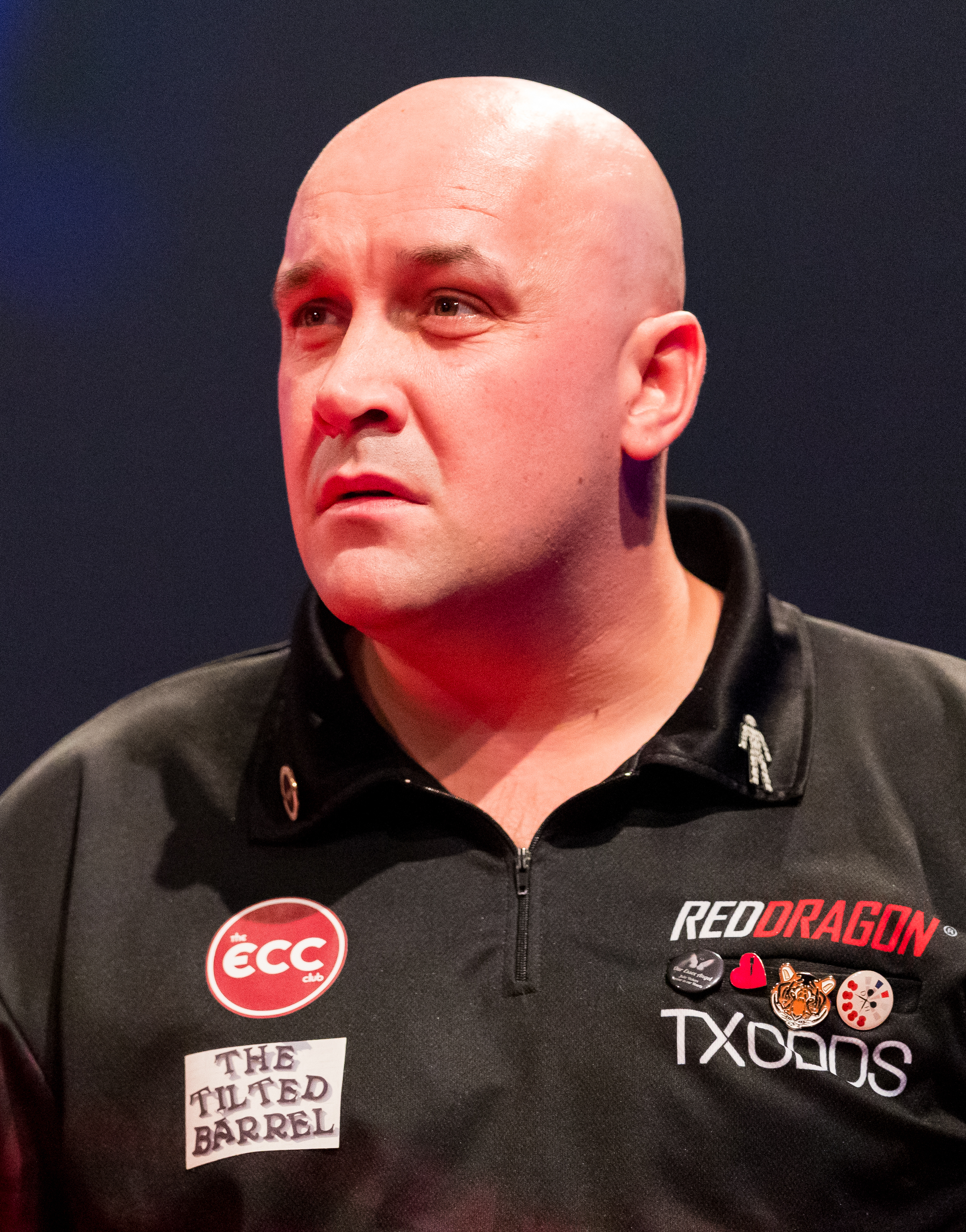
- Hughes in 2019

Personal information
- Nickname: "Yozza"
- Born: 27 February 1986 (age 40) West Bromwich, England
- Home town: Tipton, West Midlands, England

Sport
- Sport: Darts
- Playing since: 1996
- Darts: Jamie 'Yozza' Hughes Red Dragon 26g
- Laterality: Right-handed
- Walk-on music: "Hi Ho Silver Lining" by Jeff Beck

Organisation (see split in darts)
- BDO: 2007–2018
- PDC: 2018– (Tour Card: 2019–2024)

WDF major events – best performances
- World Championship: Semi-final: 2016, 2017
- World Masters: Runner-up: 2014
- World Trophy: Semi-final: 2016
- Finder Masters: Winner (1): 2014

PDC premier events – best performances
- World Championship: Last 64: 2021, 2024
- World Matchplay: Last 32: 2019, 2020
- World Grand Prix: Last 32: 2019, 2020
- UK Open: Quarter-final: 2020
- Grand Slam: Last 16: 2016
- European Championship: Last 16: 2020
- PC Finals: Last 32: 2019, 2020, 2022
- World Series Finals: Last 24: 2022

Other tournament wins
- Years
Antwerp Open	2014
British Classic	2017
British Pentathlon	2015
Gwynedd Open	2013
Isle Of Man Classic	2017
Jersey Classic	2015
PDC Challenge Tour	2018
Romanian Classic	2015, 2016
Swedish Open	2015
WDF Europe Cup Team	2016
WDF World Cup Team	2015
PDC European Tour Events
Czech Darts Open	2019

Jamie Hughes (born 27 February 1986) is an English professional darts player who competes in Professional Darts Corporation (PDC) events. Hughes formerly played in British Darts Organisation (BDO) events, winning the 2014 Finder Darts Masters. He was also the runner-up at the 2014 World Masters and the 2016 Finder Darts Masters, a semi-finalist at the BDO World Darts Championship in 2016 and 2017, the 2016 BDO World Trophy, and the 2017 Finder Masters, and a quarter-finalist at the 2015 World Masters. Hughes switched to the PDC after a first round exit at the 2018 BDO World Championship and won a PDC Tour Card in 2019, reaching the quarter-finals at the 2020 UK Open, while he was also the runner-up at 2023's Players Championship 1.

== BDO career ==
=== 2014–2015 ===
Hughes broke out in 2014 by entering the world's top ten in the BDO and reaching the final of the 2014 Winmau World Masters. He defeated Alan Norris 3–2 in sets in the quarter-finals from 2–0 down, and Martin Adams 6–5 in the semi-finals from 5–2 down, also surviving ten match darts in the ninth set. Hughes was beaten by Martin Phillips 7–3 having led 2–0 and thrown for the third set. In December, Hughes won the Zuiderduin Masters on his first appearance at the event, surviving six match darts in the semi-final against Tony O'Shea before beating Gary Robson 5–0 in the final, losing only three legs in the whole match.

Hughes made his World Championship debut at the 2015 BDO World Darts Championship as the number 10 seed. He beat Michel van der Horst in the first round before losing in the second round to his good friend Glen Durrant. Hughes then went on to make the 2015 BDO World Trophy as the fifth seed; however, he was surprisingly beaten 7–4 by Stefaan Deprez in the last 16. Later on in the year Hughes reached the quarter-finals of the 2015 World Masters but was surprisingly beaten by Thomas Junghans. Hughes failed to defend his previous Zuiderduin Masters finals and was knocked out of the competition in the group stage.

=== 2016–2018 ===
Hughes was the fourth seed going into the 2016 BDO World Darts Championship, beating Ross Montgomery, Madars Razma and fifth seed Wesley Harms to reach the semi-finals for the first time. He was defeated 6–1 by eventual winner Scott Waites; however, reaching the semi-finals meant he automatically qualified for the 2017 tournament. Hughes achieved his best ever World Trophy result when he reached the semi-finals, where he was defeated 11–9 by eventual winner Darryl Fitton. Hughes qualified for the PDC event the Grand Slam of Darts for the first time due to his ranking. He beat Dave Chisnall and James Wilson to finish top of his group. He was beaten 10–9 by Chris Dobey in the last 16. Hughes reached the semi-finals of the 2016 World Masters but was beaten by eventual winner Glen Durrant. In the 2016 Zuiderduin Masters he reached the final, before once again being beaten by Glen Durrant.

In the 2017 BDO World Darts Championship Hughes reached the semi-finals for the second year in a row before being beaten 6–1 by eventual winner Glen Durrant.

In the 2018 BDO World Darts Championship Hughes lost to German debutant Michael Unterbuchner 3–2 in the first round.

== PDC career ==
=== 2018 ===
Hughes switched to the PDC following the 2018 BDO World Darts Championship, entering the 2018 UK Q-School. He was unable to win a Tour Card. Hughes finished 12th on the 2018 Challenge Tour Order of Merit, winning one event and making another semi-final. Hughes made the last 32 of the 2018 UK Open and qualified for his first European Tour event, the 2018 European Darts Open. Hughes played at the last 4 Players Championship events in 2018, as a Challenge Tour call-up. He picked up £13,000 in ranking money in 2018.

=== 2019 ===
Hughes won a PDC Tour Card for the first time on the first day of 2019 UK Q-School, beating Kirk Shepherd 5–1 in the final.

Hughes was to win his first PDC title in June, claiming the 2019 Czech Darts Open in Prague with an 8–3 win over Stephen Bunting, after knocking out the number 14 seed Simon Whitlock in the semi-final. He also reached the semi-finals at Players Championship 24. This helped him qualify for the all the premier events at the back end of the year, achieving a 6–2 win against Jermaine Wattimena at the 2019 Players Championship Finals in the first round before losing to Rob Cross.

=== 2023 ===
At Players Championship 1 Hughes reached the final, losing there to Ryan Searle 8–4.

He achieved a 3–1 first round victory over David Cameron at the PDC World Championship, but lost to Krzysztof Ratajski by the same scoreline in round 2.

== World Championship results ==
=== BDO World Championship ===
- 2015: Second round (lost to Glen Durrant 1–4)
- 2016: Semi-finals (lost to Scott Waites 1–6)
- 2017: Semi-finals (lost to Glen Durrant 1–6)
- 2018: First round (lost to Michael Unterbuchner 2–3)

=== PDC World Championship ===
- 2020: First round (lost to Zoran Lerchbacher 2–3)
- 2021: Second round (lost to Adam Hunt 0–3)
- 2022: First round (lost to Raymond Smith 1–3)
- 2023: First round (lost to Jimmy Hendriks 1–3)
- 2024: Second round (lost to Krzysztof Ratajski 1–3)

== Performance timeline ==
=== BDO ===
Tournament	2010	2011	2012	2013	2014	2015	2016	2017	2018
BDO Ranked televised events
World Championship	DNP					2R	SF	SF	1R
World Trophy	Not held				DNP	2R	SF	1R	PDC
World Masters	Prel.	DNP	L144	L272	RU	QF	SF	L32	PDC
Zuiderduin Masters	DNP				W	RR	RU	SF	PDC
Career statistics
Year-end ranking	582	120	60	29	3	2	2	2	–

=== PDC ===
Tournament	2012	2016	2017	2018	2019	2020	2021	2022	2023	2024
PDC Ranked televised events
World Championship	Non-PDC				DNQ	1R	2R	1R	1R	2R
UK Open	Prel.	DNQ		4R	5R	QF	4R	5R	3R	3R
World Matchplay	Non-PDC			DNQ	1R	1R	DNQ			
World Grand Prix	Non-PDC			DNQ	1R	1R	DNQ			
European Championship	Non-PDC			DNQ	1R	2R	DNQ			
Grand Slam	DNP	2R	RR	DNQ	RR	DNQ				
Players Championship Finals	Non-PDC			DNQ	2R	2R	WD	2R	1R	DNQ
Career statistics
Year-end ranking	Not ranked				47	27	38	56	57	71

==== European Tour ====
Season	1	2	3	4	5	6	7	8	9	10	11	12	13	
2018	EDO; 2R	Did not participate/qualify												
2019	EDO; DNQ	GDC; 2R	GDG; 1R	GDO; 3R	ADO; 2R	EDG; SF	DDM; DNQ	DDO; DNQ	CDO; W	ADC; 1R	EDM; 2R	IDO; 2R	GDT; 1R	
2020	BDC; 3R	GDC; DNQ	EDG; 3R	IDO; 3R										
2022	IDO; DNQ	GDC; 2R	Did not qualify						DDC; 1R	EDM; 1R	HDT; DNQ	GDO; 1R	BDO; 2R	GDT; DNQ
2023	Did not qualify							CDO; 1R	Did not qualify					
2024	Did not qualify							EDO; 1R	Did not qualify					

==== Players Championships ====
Season	1	2	3	4	5	6	7	8	9	10	11	12	13	14	15	16	17	18	19	20	21	22	23	24	25	26	27	28	29	30
2018 (Note: Not a Tour card holder)	Did not participate																		DUB; 4R	DUB; 2R	BAR; 2R	BAR; 3R								
2019	WIG; DNP	WIG; DNP	WIG; 3R	WIG; 2R	BAR; 3R	BAR; 1R	WIG; 3R	WIG; 1R	BAR; 2R	BAR; 1R	BAR; 2R	BAR; 1R	BAR; 1R	BAR; 2R	BAR; 1R	BAR; 1R	WIG; QF	WIG; 2R	BAR; 1R	BAR; 1R	HIL; 2R	HIL; 2R	BAR; 1R	BAR; SF	BAR; 1R	BAR; 3R	DUB; 1R	DUB; 3R	BAR; 1R	BAR; 2R
2020	BAR; 3R	BAR; QF	WIG; 1R	WIG; 4R	WIG; 2R	WIG; 4R	BAR; 2R	BAR; 1R	MIL; 4R	MIL; 1R	MIL; 1R	MIL; QF	MIL; 3R	NIE; 1R	NIE; 1R	NIE; 1R	NIE; 3R	NIE; 4R	COV; 1R	COV; 3R	COV; 1R	COV; 1R	COV; 1R							
2021	BOL; DNP	BOL; DNP	BOL; DNP	BOL; DNP	MIL; 2R	MIL; SF	MIL; 3R	MIL; 2R	NIE; QF	NIE; 2R	NIE; 3R	NIE; 2R	MIL; 1R	MIL; 3R	MIL; 1R	MIL; 1R	COV; 3R	COV; 2R	COV; 1R	COV; 2R	BAR; 1R	BAR; 1R	BAR; SF	BAR; 3R	BAR; 1R	BAR; 1R	BAR; 1R	BAR; 3R	BAR; 3R	BAR; 2R
2022	BAR; 3R	BAR; 1R	WIG; 4R	WIG; 1R	BAR; 2R	BAR; 2R	NIE; 1R	NIE; 4R	BAR; 1R	BAR; 1R	BAR; 2R	BAR; 1R	BAR; 1R	WIG; 1R	WIG; 4R	NIE; 2R	NIE; 1R	BAR; 3R	BAR; QF	BAR; 3R	BAR; 2R	BAR; 1R	BAR; 3R	BAR; 2R	BAR; 1R	BAR; 3R	BAR; 2R	BAR; 1R	BAR; 2R	BAR; 4R
2023	BAR; F	BAR; 4R	BAR; 4R	BAR; 2R	BAR; 1R	BAR; 1R	HIL; 1R	HIL; 1R	WIG; DNP	WIG; 1R	LEI; 2R	LEI; 1R	HIL; 2R	HIL; 1R	LEI; 1R	LEI; 1R	HIL; 4R	HIL; 2R	BAR; 1R	BAR; 2R	BAR; 1R	BAR; 1R	BAR; 1R	BAR; 1R	BAR; 1R	BAR; 2R	BAR; 1R	BAR; 3R	BAR; 4R	BAR; 4R
2024	WIG; 4R	WIG; 1R	LEI; 2R	LEI; 2R	HIL; 1R	HIL; 2R	LEI; 1R	LEI; 2R	HIL; 1R	HIL; 1R	HIL; 1R	HIL; 2R	MIL; DNP	MIL; 4R	MIL; 1R	MIL; 1R	MIL; 1R	MIL; 2R	MIL; 2R	WIG; 4R	WIG; 1R	MIL; 1R	MIL; 1R	WIG; 2R	WIG; 2R	WIG; 3R	WIG; 1R	WIG; 1R	LEI; 1R	LEI; 1R

Performance Table Legend
W	Won the tournament	F	Finalist	SF	Semifinalist	QF	Quarterfinalist	#R; RR; Prel.	Lost in # round Round-robin; Preliminary round	DQ	Disqualified
DNQ	Did not qualify	DNP	Did not participate	WD	Withdrew	NH	Tournament not held	#R; RR; Prel.	Lost in # round Round-robin; Preliminary round	NYF	Not yet founded
