= Darius Labanauskas =

Lithuanian darts player (born 1976)

Personal information
- Nickname: "Lucky D"
- Born: 26 July 1976 (age 50) Kaunas, Lithuanian SSR (now Lithuania)
- Home town: Garliava, Lithuania

Sport
- Sport: Darts
- Playing since: 2004
- Darts: 24g Cosmo Signature
- Laterality: Right-handed
- Walk-on music: "Infinity 2008" by Guru Josh Project

Organisation (see split in darts)
- BDO: 2006–2018
- PDC: 2018–present (Tour Card: 2019–2023; 2026–)
- Current world ranking: (PDC) 87 ▼1 (5 November 2026)

WDF major events – best performances
- World Championship: Quarter-final: 2017
- World Masters: Last 16: 2015, 2016
- World Trophy: Quarter-final: 2016, 2018
- Finder Masters: Quarter-final: 2017

PDC premier events – best performances
- World Championship: Quarter-final: 2020
- World Grand Prix: Last 16: 2021
- UK Open: Last 32: 2021
- European Championship: Last 32: 2020
- PC Finals: Last 32: 2019, 2021
- World Series Finals: Last 16: 2020

Other tournament wins
- Years
MODUS Super Series 9	2024
BDO/WDF Ranked events
Adeficator Open	2016
Baltic Cup Open (×2)	2013, 2017
Denmark Open	2016
Estonian Masters	2017
Estonian Open (×3)	2012, 2013, 2015
Hal Open	2016
Kaunas Open	2024
Latvian Open (×3)	2017, 2018, 2024
Lithuania Open (×6)	2008, 2011, 2013, 2015, 2016, 2018
Polish Open	2015
Riga Masters	2014
Riga Open (×3)	2011, 2014, 2015
Trakai Castle Cup (×2)	2010, 2014
PDC Secondary and affiliate tours
PDC Challenge Tour	2025 (x3)
PDC Nordic & Baltic Pro Tour (×15)	2018 (×2); 2019 (×4); 2022 (×4); 2024 (×2); 2025 (×1); 2026 (×2)
Medal record
Men's Darts
Representing Lithuania
WDF World Cup
Bronze medal – third place	2015 Antalya	Men's singles
WDF Europe Cup
Silver medal – second place	2012 Kemer	Men's pairs
Silver medal – second place	2014 Bucharest	Men's singles

Darius Labanauskas (born 26 July 1976) is a Lithuanian professional darts player who competes in Professional Darts Corporation (PDC) events. He formerly competed in the British Darts Organisation (BDO) and World Darts Federation (WDF), where he was ranked world number one in 2015 and 2016. He is a two-time world championship quarter-finalist, reaching the last eight at the 2017 BDO World Championship and the 2020 PDC World Championship. He reached his first PDC ranking final in 2019.

== Career ==
=== BDO ===
Labanauskas is a three-time Lithuania National Champion and won the Lithuania Open in 2011 and 2013. He also won the Baltic Cup Open in 2013, the Estonian Open in 2012 and 2013, and in 2014 he won the Trakai Castle Cup, the Riga Open and the Riga Masters. He was runner-up in the WDF Europe Cup singles in 2014, losing to Irishman David Concannon in the final. 2014 also saw him reach the final of the Estonian Open, Finnish Open and Baltic Cup Open.

His performances in 2014 helped Labanauskas qualify for the 2015 BDO World Darts Championship outright via his world ranking. He was beaten by Robbie Green in the first round despite hitting a 167 checkout during the match.

Consistent qualification for the BDO World Championship paid off in 2017 as he reached the quarter-finals before losing 5–2 to eventual champion Glen Durrant.

=== PDC ===
In 2018, Labanauskas competed on the PDC Nordic & Baltic Pro Tour, finishing in the top two to qualify for the 2019 PDC World Darts Championship. He beat Matthew Edgar and Raymond van Barneveld before going out to Adrian Lewis in the last 32 with prize money of £25,000. This run was followed by PDC European Q-School, where he reached the final on the fourth day and beat Vincent van der Meer 5–3 to win a PDC Tour Card for the first time. In May 2019, Labanauskas became the first Lithuanian player to reach a PDC ranking final, losing 8–1 to Glen Durrant in the final of Players Championship 15.

Labanauskas was a quarter-finalist at the 2020 World Championship. He earned victories against Matthew Edgar, Ian White, Max Hopp and Steve Beaton on his way to the last eight, where he faced defending champion Michael van Gerwen. Labanauskas won the opening set of the match but only claimed one more set as he lost 5–2. He qualified for the 2020 European Darts Grand Prix in October, where he reached the quarter-finals before being eliminated by eventual champion José de Sousa.

Labanauskas won his opening match of the 2021 World Championship 3–0 against Chengan Liu, before going out in the second round in a 3–2 defeat to Simon Whitlock. He made his World Grand Prix debut at the 2021 edition and defeated Brendan Dolan 2–1 in the first round. He took a two-set lead against Ian White in the second round but went on to lose 3–2. At the 2022 PDC World Darts Championship, Labanauskas hit his first televised nine-dart finish in a first-round defeat to Mike De Decker. At the 2023 World Championship, he came back from 2–0 down to defeat John O'Shea 3–2 in the first round. He was eliminated by Ross Smith in the next round.

Labanauskas lost his PDC Tour Card at the end of 2023 and was unable to regain it at 2024 Q-School, ending a five-year run as a Tour Card holder. After winning three titles on the 2024 PDC Nordic and Baltic Tour, he secured a return to the PDC World Championship for the 2025 edition by finishing second on the tour's Order of Merit. In the lead-up to the tournament, he won series nine of the MODUS Super Series, defeating Tom Sykes 4–2 in the Champions Week final to earn the £20,000 top prize. He lost 3–1 to Ryan Joyce in the first round of the World Championship.

Labanauskas finished second on the 2025 PDC Challenge Tour ranking, earning his return to the Pro Tour in 2026. At the 2026 World Championship, he faced defending world champion Luke Littler in the first round. Despite taking the first two sets to deciding legs, Labanauskas lost 3–0.

== Personal life ==
Labanauskas lives in Garliava, where he has taught free darts lessons for beginners and advanced players. He previously worked as a potter and has attributed his calmness and patience during play to his time making pottery.

== World Championship results ==
=== BDO World Championship ===
- 2015: First round (lost to Robbie Green 1–3)
- 2016: Preliminary round (lost to Seigo Asada 1–3)
- 2017: Quarter-finals (lost to Glen Durrant 2–5)
- 2018: First round (lost to Scott Mitchell 2–3)

=== PDC World Championship ===
- 2019: Third round (lost to Adrian Lewis 0–4)
- 2020: Quarter-finals (lost to Michael van Gerwen 2–5)
- 2021: Second round (lost to Simon Whitlock 2–3)
- 2022: First round (lost to Mike De Decker 1–3)
- 2023: Second round (lost to Ross Smith 1–3)
- 2025: First round (lost to Ryan Joyce 1–3)
- 2026: First round (lost to Luke Littler 0–3)

== Performance timeline ==
BDO

Tournament	2014	2015	2016	2017	2018
BDO Ranked televised events
BDO World Championship	DNQ	1R	Prel.	QF	1R
BDO World Trophy	DNQ	1R	QF	2R	QF
World Masters	2R	6R	6R	3R	DNQ
Zuiderduin Masters	DNQ	RR	RR	QF	DNQ
Career statistics
Year-end ranking	12	13	3	18	37

=== PDC ===
Tournament	2019	2020	2021	2022	2023	2024	2025	2026
PDC Ranked televised events
World Championship	3R	QF	2R	1R	2R	DNQ	1R	1R
World Masters	Did not qualify						Prel.	Prel.
UK Open	1R	3R	5R	5R	4R	DNQ	2R	3R
World Grand Prix	DNQ		2R	Did not qualify				
European Championship	DNQ	1R	Did not qualify					
Players Championship Finals	2R	1R	2R	Did not qualify				
PDC Non-ranked televised events
World Cup	1R	2R	2R	1R	RR	RR	RR	RR
World Series Finals	DNQ	2R	Did not qualify					
Career statistics
Season-end ranking	52	43	43	52	74	140	88	

==== European Tour ====
Season	1	2	3	4	5	6	7	8	9	10	11	12	13	14	15
2018	DNQ			ADO; 2R	DNQ		GDT; 2R	DDO; 3R	EDM; 2R	GDC; 1R	DDC; 2R	DNQ			
2019	Did not qualify				ADO; 3R	Did not qualify							GDT; 1R		
2020	DNQ		EDG; QF	IDO; DNQ											
2022	IDO; DNQ	GDC; 2R	GDG; DNQ	ADO; 1R	Did not qualify					HDT; 1R	DNQ				
2023	Did not qualify							CDO; 1R	DNQ		GDO; 1R	DNQ			
2024	Did not qualify				ADO; 2R	Did not qualify									
2025	BDO; 1R	EDT; DNQ	IDO; 2R	Did not qualify							CDO; 1R	DNQ		GDC; 1R	
2026	PDO; DNQ	EDT; 2R	Did not qualify							EDO; 1R	Did not qualify				

==== Players Championships ====
Season	1	2	3	4	5	6	7	8	9	10	11	12	13	14	15	16	17	18	19	20	21	22	23	24	25	26	27	28	29	30	31	32	33	34
2019	WIG; 3R	WIG; 2R	WIG; 1R	WIG; 3R	BAR; 2R	BAR; 1R	WIG; 1R	WIG; 1R	BAR; 1R	BAR; 1R	BAR; 3R	BAR; 3R	BAR; 1R	BAR; SF	BAR; F	BAR; 1R	WIG; 2R	WIG; 2R	BAR; 2R	BAR; 2R	HIL; 4R	HIL; 1R	DNP		BAR; 1R	BAR; 2R	DUB; 1R	DUB; 1R	BAR; 2R	BAR; 1R				
2020	BAR; 3R	BAR; 3R	WIG; 2R	WIG; 3R	WIG; 1R	WIG; 2R	BAR; 1R	BAR; 1R	MIL; 1R	MIL; 1R	MIL; 1R	MIL; 1R	MIL; 3R	NIE; 1R	NIE; 1R	NIE; 2R	NIE; 1R	NIE; 1R	COV; 1R	COV; QF	COV; 1R	COV; 2R	COV; 3R											
2021	BOL; 1R	BOL; 3R	BOL; 4R	BOL; 4R	MIL; 4R	MIL; 4R	MIL; QF	MIL; 2R	NIE; 1R	NIE; 1R	NIE; 1R	NIE; 1R	MIL; 2R	MIL; 2R	MIL; 2R	MIL; 1R	COV; 2R	COV; 4R	COV; 1R	COV; 2R	BAR; 3R	BAR; 3R	BAR; 3R	BAR; 2R	BAR; 2R	BAR; 1R	BAR; 1R	BAR; 1R	BAR; 1R	BAR; SF				
2022	BAR; 1R	BAR; 2R	WIG; 1R	WIG; 2R	BAR; 1R	BAR; 3R	NIE; 1R	NIE; 1R	BAR; 3R	BAR; 4R	BAR; 2R	BAR; 1R	BAR; 1R	WIG; 1R	WIG; 2R	NIE; 1R	NIE; 1R	BAR; 1R	BAR; 2R	BAR; 2R	BAR; 2R	BAR; 3R	BAR; 2R	BAR; 1R	BAR; 2R	BAR; 1R	BAR; 1R	BAR; 2R	BAR; 2R	BAR; 1R				
2023	BAR; 1R	BAR; 1R	BAR; 1R	BAR; 1R	BAR; 2R	BAR; 1R	HIL; 2R	HIL; 1R	WIG; 2R	WIG; 2R	LEI; 1R	LEI; 1R	HIL; 2R	HIL; 2R	LEI; 1R	LEI; 1R	HIL; 2R	HIL; 2R	BAR; 1R	BAR; 1R	BAR; 1R	BAR; 2R	BAR; 1R	BAR; 1R	BAR; 1R	BAR; 3R	BAR; 3R	BAR; 1R	BAR; 3R	BAR; 2R				
2024 (Note: Not a Tour card holder)	Did not participate																												LEI; 1R	LEI; 1R				
2025	WIG; 1R	WIG; 2R	ROS; 1R	ROS; 2R	LEI; DNP		HIL; 1R	HIL; 2R	LEI; 2R	LEI; 2R	LEI; 2R	LEI; 1R	ROS; 3R	ROS; 1R	HIL; 2R	HIL; 4R	LEI; 4R	LEI; 1R	LEI; 3R	LEI; 1R	LEI; 1R	HIL; 1R	HIL; 1R	MIL; 2R	MIL; 3R	HIL; 3R	HIL; 1R	LEI; 1R	LEI; 2R	LEI; 2R	WIG; 1R	WIG; 1R	WIG; 2R	WIG; 1R
2026	HIL; 1R	HIL; 1R	WIG; 3R	WIG; 3R	LEI; 1R	LEI; 1R	LEI; 2R	LEI; 2R	WIG; 2R	WIG; 1R	MIL; 1R	MIL; 2R	HIL; QF	HIL; 3R	LEI; 3R	LEI; 4R	LEI; 1R	LEI; 4R	MIL; 1R	MIL; 1R	WIG; 3R	WIG; 2R	LEI; 1R	LEI; 1R	HIL; 2R	HIL; 2R	LEI; 1R	LEI; 2R	ROS; 3R	ROS; 2R	ROS; 2R	ROS; 4R	LEI; 2R	LEI; 1R

==== World Series of Darts ====
Tournament	2021	2022	2023	2025	2026
Nordic Darts Masters	1R	1R	1R	1R	1R

Performance Table Legend
W	Won the tournament	F	Finalist	SF	Semifinalist	QF	Quarterfinalist	#R; RR; Prel.	Lost in # round Round-robin; Preliminary round	DQ	Disqualified
DNQ	Did not qualify	DNP	Did not participate	WD	Withdrew	NH	Tournament not held	#R; RR; Prel.	Lost in # round Round-robin; Preliminary round	NYF	Not yet founded

== Nine-dart finishes ==
Darius Labanauskas's televised nine-dart finishes
Date	Opponent	Tournament	Method
18 December 2021	(Belgium) Mike De Decker	PDC World Championship	T20, 2 x T19; 3 x T20; T20, T17, D18
