= Rachel Brooks =

English darts player

Personal information
- Born: 30 September 1963 (age 63) Doncaster, England
- Home town: Wroot, England

Sport
- Sport: Darts
- Playing since: 2008
- Laterality: Right-handed
- Walk-on music: "Rockin' All Over the World" by Status Quo

Organisation (see split in darts)
- BDO: 2012–2017
- PDC: 2017-

WDF major events – best performances
- World Championship: Quarter Final: 2015
- World Masters: Runner Up: 2013
- World Trophy: Quarter Final: 2015, 2017

Other tournament wins
- Tournament: Years
- Czech Open Finnish Open Turkish Open: 2012; 2013; 2013

Rachel Brooks (born 30 September 1963, from Wroot) is an English darts player.

== Career ==
Brooks started playing darts when she was 45, and now competes on the international level. In 2012, she won her first tournament, the Czech Open, and in 2013 she was runner up at the World Masters. She had many other good results that year, and qualified for the Women's World Championship in 2014 as the number five seed. Brooks lost her first-round game against Ann-Louise Peters. Brooks has now joined the PDC organisation and will be competing against men

== World Championship results ==
=== BDO ===
- 2014: 1st Round (lost to Ann-Louise Peters 0-2)
- 2015: Quarter-finals (lost to Sharon Prins 1-2)
- 2016: 1st Round (lost to Lorraine Winstanley 0-2)
- 2017: 1st Round (lost to Aileen de Graaf 0-2)
