= 2024 World Seniors Darts Matchplay =

Tournament information
- Dates: 4–5 October 2024
- Venue: York Barbican
- Location: York
- Country: England
- Organisation(s): WSDT
- Format: Legs; Final – best of 17 legs
- Prize fund: £31,000
- Winner's share: £10,000
- High checkout: 160 Trina Gulliver

Champion(s)
- John Henderson

The 2024 World Seniors Darts Matchplay will be the third World Seniors Darts Matchplay organised by the World Seniors Darts Tour and will be held at the York Barbican in York, England, between 4–5 October 2024.

Leonard Gates is the defending champion after defeating Jim McEwan 9–6 in the 2023 final.

== Format ==
As with the World Matchplay tournaments organised by the Professional Darts Corporation, the Matchplay used the leg format, and the winner needing to be two legs clear at the winning post, with a game being extended if necessary for a maximum of six extra legs before a tie-break leg is required. For example, in a first to 8 legs first round match, if the score reaches 10–10 then the 21st leg will be the decider.

The first round and the quarter-finals were the best of 15 legs (or first to 8 legs), and the semi-finals and final were the best of 17 legs (or first to 9).

== Prize money ==
The prize fund is expected to remain at £31,000, with the winner earning £10,000.

Position (no. of players)		Prize money (Total: £31,000)
Winner	(1)	£10,000
Runner-up	(1)	£5,000
Semi-finalists	(2)	£2,500
Quarter-finalists	(4)	£1,250
First round	(8)	£750

== Qualifiers ==
The full field was of 16 players was confirmed on 30 July.

On 30 September, it was announced that Phil Taylor had withdrawn due to injury, with Tony O'Shea taking his place in the draw.

Seeds

1. Richie Howson (semi-finals)
2. Robert Thornton (semi-finals)
3. Leonard Gates (runner-up)
4. John Henderson (champion)
5. Kevin Painter (first round)
6. Paul Hogan (first round)
7. Martin Adams (quarter-finals)
8. Neil Duff (quarter-finals)

Invited Players

- ~~Phil Taylor~~ (Withdrew)
- Lisa Ashton (quarter-finals)
- Trina Gulliver (first round)
- Chris Mason (first round)
- John Part (first round)

WSDT Order of Merit Qualifier

- Matt Clark (first round)

Qualifiers

- James Richardson (first round)
- David Cameron (quarter-finals)

Alternate

- Tony O'Shea (first round)

== Draw ==
The draw took place on 5 August.

First round (best of 15 legs); 4 October
1	Richie Howson 87.63	8
Trina Gulliver 81.69	4
8	Neil Duff 96.10	8
Chris Mason 88.22	4
4	John Henderson 80.47	8
Alt	Tony O'Shea 77.28	5
5	Kevin Painter 76.02	3
Q	David Cameron 83.68	8
2	Robert Thornton 81.35	10
John Part 77.71	8
7	Martin Adams 80.02	8
Q	Matt Clark 75.96	6
3	Leonard Gates 89.80	8
Q	James Richardson 83.71	5
6	Paul Hogan 91.04	3
Lisa Ashton 87.31	8

Quarter-finals (best of 15 legs); 5 October
1	Richie Howson 90.75	8
8	Neil Duff 88.09	4
4	John Henderson 93.53	8
Q	David Cameron 87.28	6
2	Robert Thornton 79.33	8
7	Martin Adams 72.79	4
3	Leonard Gates 83.98	8
Lisa Ashton 80.00	1

Semi-finals (best of 17 legs); 5 October
1	Richie Howson 88.27	6
4	John Henderson 87.50	9
2	Robert Thornton 81.70	4
3	Leonard Gates 85.60	9

Final (best of 17 legs); 5 October
4	John Henderson 85.43	9
3	Leonard Gates 87.44	6
