= 2022 PDC North American Championship =

2022 bet365 North American Championship

Tournament information
- Dates: 4 June 2022
- Venue: Hulu Theater
- Location: New York City, United States
- Organisation(s): Professional Darts Corporation (PDC)
- Format: Legs; First to 6 legs
- Prize fund: US$25,000
- Winner's share: US$10,000
- High checkout: 142 Danny Baggish

Champion(s)
- Leonard Gates (USA)

The 2022 North American Championship (known for sponsorship reasons as the Bet365 North American Championship) was the fourth edition of the tournament organized by the Professional Darts Corporation for North American players. The tournament took place at the Hulu Theater, New York City, United States on 4 June 2022, and featured the 8 players from the North American side of players that had qualified for the 2022 US Darts Masters, competing in a knockout system, with the winner earning a place in the 2023 PDC World Darts Championship and the 2022 Grand Slam of Darts.

Danny Baggish was the defending champion after defeating Jeff Smith 6–5 in the 2019 final, but he would lose 6–3 in the final to Leonard Gates.

== Format ==
The format of the tournament was the same as before, using a leg format, with all the matches being the best of 11 legs (or first to 6 legs).

== Prize money ==
The total prize fund was US$25,000. The winner of the tournament got a spot in the 2023 PDC World Darts Championship and the 2022 Grand Slam of Darts.

Position (no. of players)		Prize money (Total: US$25,000)
Winner	(1)	US$10,000
Runner-up	(1)	US$5,000
Semi-finalists	(2)	US$2,500
Quarter-finalists	(4)	US$1,250

== Qualifiers ==
The eight qualifiers for the tournament were the 8 players from the North American side of players on the 2022 US Darts Masters. 4 of them were PDC Tour Card holders from North America, and the other 4 came through the CDC qualifier.

The qualifiers are:

1. Jeff Smith (quarter-finals)
2. Matt Campbell (quarter-finals)
3. Danny Baggish (runner-up)
4. Jules van Dongen (quarter-finals)
5. David Cameron (semi-finals)
6. Leonard Gates (champion)
7. Doug Boehm (quarter-finals)
8. Danny Lauby (semi-finals)

== Draw ==
Quarter-finals (best of 11 legs)
1	Jeff Smith 84.24	4
David Cameron 91.81	6
4	Jules van Dongen 87.66	2
Leonard Gates 95.28	6
2	Matt Campbell 90.02	5
Danny Lauby 92.48	6
3	Danny Baggish 90.64	6
Doug Boehm 82.34	2

Semi-finals (best of 11 legs)
David Cameron 89.61	5
Leonard Gates 95.31	6
Danny Lauby 88.76	4
3	Danny Baggish 91.78	6

Final (best of 11 legs)
Leonard Gates 87.71	6
3	Danny Baggish 94.84	3
