= Leonard Gates =

American darts player (born 1970)

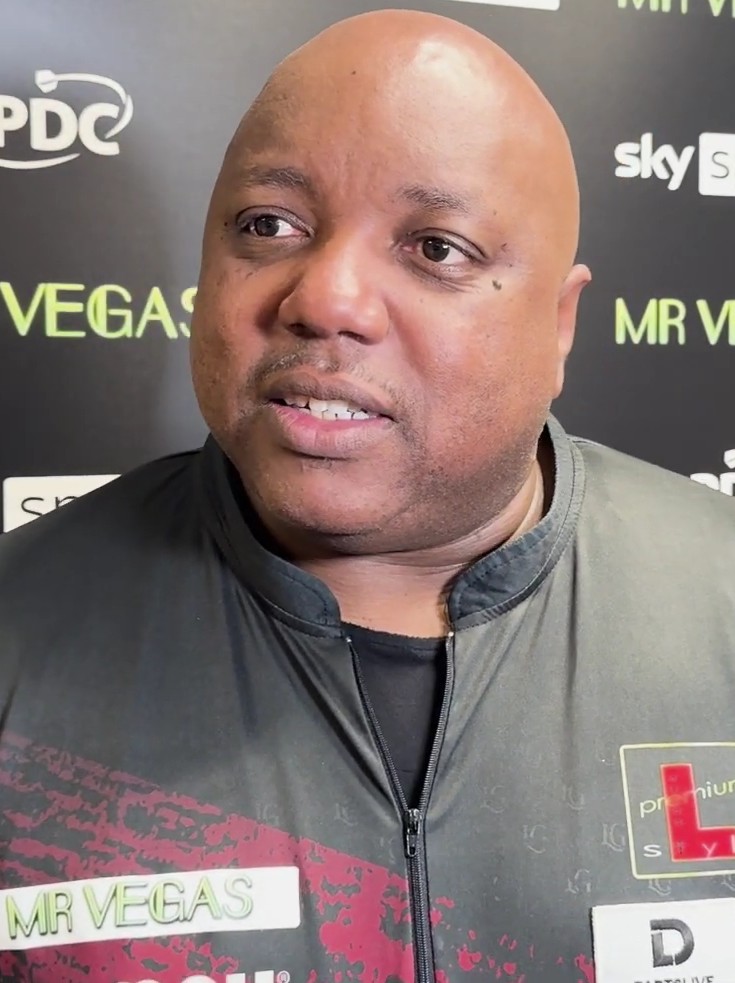
- Gates at the 2024 Grand Slam of Darts

Personal information
- Nicknames: "Soulger" "Soldier"
- Born: November 26, 1970 (age 55) San Antonio, Texas, U.S.
- Home town: Houston, Texas, U.S.

Sport
- Sport: Darts
- Playing since: 2007
- Darts: 21g Winmau Signature
- Laterality: Right-handed
- Walk-on music: "Too Hot ta Trot" by Commodores

Organisation (see split in darts)
- BDO: 2007–2020
- PDC: 2016–
- WDF: 2007–
- Current world ranking: (WDF) 6 ▲2 (17 August 2026)

WDF major events – best performances
- World Championship: Last 16: 2023
- World Masters: Last 272: 2017

PDC premier events – best performances
- World Championship: Last 64: 2023, 2025, 2026
- UK Open: Last 64: 2024
- Grand Slam: Group Stage: 2022, 2024
- World Series Finals: Last 16: 2022

WSDT major events – best performances
- World Championship: Semi-final: 2023
- World Matchplay: Winner (1): 2023
- World Masters: Winner (1): 2023
- Champions: Winner (1): 2023

Other tournament wins
- Years
CDC Continental Cup	2024
CDC Cross-Border Challenge	2025
CDC USA Series	2021
North American Championship	2022
CDC Pro Tour (x11)
2018 (x2); 2021 (x1); 2022 (x1); 2023 (x2); 2024 (x3); 2025 (x2)

Leonard Gates (born November 26, 1970) is an American professional darts player who competes in Professional Darts Corporation (PDC) and World Darts Federation (WDF) events. In World Seniors Darts (WSD) he won three televised titles in 2023; the WSDT Champion of Champions, World Seniors Matchplay and the World Seniors Masters. He was the 2022 PDC North American champion and has won 11 titles on the CDC Pro Tour. Gates has been ranked as WDF world number one.

He is also a former baseball player, playing for Abilene Prairie Dogs, Massachusetts Mad Dogs, Catskill Cougars and Nashua Pride.

== Career ==
Gates started to play in WDF in 2007, winning numerous American darts tournaments, including exhibition ones. His first appearance in major BDO tournament was in 2017 World Masters, where he lost in the last 272 to Paul Coughlin.

In 2022, Gates qualified as a seed for the 2022 WDF World Darts Championship, but he lost in the second round to Steve Hine of England.

In June, Gates took part in the 2022 US Darts Masters, where he was one of the eight North American qualifiers. He defeated Fallon Sherrock 6–2 in the first round before losing to Peter Wright 3–8 in the quarter-finals. At the same time, he played in the 2022 PDC North American Championship, where he went on to defeat Jules van Dongen and David Cameron, before beating Danny Baggish in the final and securing his first PDC title, which meant he qualified for the 2023 PDC World Darts Championship and 2022 Grand Slam of Darts as well.

In September, Gates took part in the 2022 World Series of Darts Finals, where he reached the second round, defeating Devon Petersen 6–4 in the first round, then losing to James Wade 4–6 in the next one.

In 2023, Gates and Jules van Dongen represented the United States on the World Cup of Darts, but they lost in the group stage.

In 2024, Gates qualified for his first PDC major of 2024, qualifying for the UK Open. In round 1, he narrowly beat Conan Whitehead in a close game, in the second round he faced Rhys Grffin whom he beat 6-3, in the third round he faced former World Championship finalist Jim Williams who Gates went on to beat 6-2 with an average of 92 per three darts, in the next round he faced a very experienced player in Martin Lukeman, it was a very long and competitive game but Gates was knocked out of the tournament with Lukeman beating him 10-5.

Also apart from steeltip darts, Gates plays in darts tournaments of the World Soft Darts Association (WSDA) as well, being one of the most popular soft-tip contenders.

== World Championship results ==
=== WDF ===
- 2022: Second round (lost to Steve Hine 0–3)
- 2023: Third round (lost to Danny Lauby 0–3)

=== PDC ===
- 2023: Second round (lost to Stephen Bunting 1–3)
- 2025: Second round (lost to Nathan Aspinall 1–3)
- 2026: Second round (lost to Nathan Aspinall 0–3)

=== WSDT ===
- 2023: Semi-finals (lost to Richie Howson 1–3)
- 2024: First round (lost to Colin McGarry 1–3)
- 2025: Quarter-finals (lost to Graham Usher 1–3)

== Performance timeline ==
PDC

Tournament	2022	2023	2024	2025	2026
PDC Ranked televised events
PDC World Championship	DNQ	2R	DNQ	2R	2R
UK Open	DNP		4R	DNP	
Grand Slam of Darts	RR	DNQ	RR	DNQ	
PDC Non-ranked televised events
PDC World Cup of Darts	DNP	RR	DNP		
Career statistics
Season-end ranking (PDC)	106	-	93		

WDF

Tournament	2022	2023
WDF Ranked major/platinum events
WDF World Championship	2R	3R
WDF World Masters	2R	DNP

WSD

Tournament	2023	2024	2025
WSD Televised events
World Seniors Darts Championship	SF	1R	QF
Champion of Champions	W	QF	DNP
World Seniors Masters	W	DNP	NH
World Seniors Matchplay	W	F	NH

== Nine-dart finishes ==
Leonard Gates televised nine-dart finishes
Date	Opponent	Tournament	Method	Prize
November 25, 2023	Martin Thomas	MODUS Super Series	3 x T20; 3 x T20; T20, T19, D12	–
