= 2023 World Seniors Darts Matchplay =

2023 JENNINGSbet World Seniors Darts Matchplay

Tournament information
- Dates: 2–3 September 2023
- Venue: York Barbican
- Location: York
- Country: England
- Organisation(s): WSDT
- Format: Legs; Final – best of 17 legs
- Prize fund: £31,000
- Winner's share: £10,000
- High checkout: 151 Neil Duff

Champion(s)
- Leonard Gates

The 2023 World Seniors Darts Matchplay (known for sponsorship reasons as the 2023 JENNINGSbet World Seniors Darts Matchplay) was the first World Seniors Darts Matchplay organised by the World Seniors Darts Tour and was held at the York Barbican in York between 2–3 September 2023.

Robert Thornton was the defending champion after defeating Phil Taylor 12–10 in the 2022 final, but was defeated 8–5 in the first round by Neil Duff.

Leonard Gates won his third consecutive World Seniors event, by defeating Jim McEwan 9–6 in the final.

== Format ==
As with the World Matchplay tournaments organised by the Professional Darts Corporation, the Matchplay used the leg format, and the winner needing to be two legs clear at the winning post, with a game being extended if necessary for a maximum of six extra legs before a tie-break leg is required. For example, in a first to 8 legs first round match, if the score reaches 10–10 then the 21st leg will be the decider.

The first round, as well as the quarter-finals are the best of 15 legs (or first to 8 legs), and the semi-finals and final are the best of 17 legs (or first to 9).

== Prize money ==
The prize fund remained at £31,000.

Position (no. of players)		Prize money (Total: £31,000)
Winner	(1)	£10,000
Runner-up	(1)	£5,000
Semi-finalists	(2)	£2,500
Quarter-finalists	(4)	£1,250
First round	(8)	£750

== Qualifiers ==
The first 11 players where announced on 20 June 2023, which included John Henderson who made his World Seniors debut as he had recently turned 50. On 29 August, it was announced that Martin Adams had withdrawn from the event for personal reasons and was replaced by Deta Hedman. The field was decreased from 20 to 16 and the event was held over 2 days down from 3.

Seeds

- (Scotland) Robert Thornton (first round)
- (United States) Leonard Gates (champion)
- (England) Phil Taylor (quarter-finals)
- (England) Deta Hedman (first round)
- (England) Glen Durrant (first round)
- (England) Scott Mitchell (first round)
- (Scotland) John Henderson (first round)
- (England) Richie Howson (quarter-finals)

Invited Players

- (Canada) David Cameron (quarter-finals)
- Neil Duff (semi-finals)
- (England) Trina Gulliver (first round)
- (England) Kevin Painter (quarter-finals)
- (Canada) John Part (first round)

WSDT Order of Merit Leader

- Colin McGarry (first round)

Qualifiers

- (Scotland) Jim McEwan (runner-up)
- (England) Paul Hogan (semi-finals)

== Draw ==
The draw for the tournament was announced on 30 July 2023.

First round (best of 15 legs); 2 September
1	Robert Thornton 81.52	5
Neil Duff 92.00	8
8	Richie Howson 86.39	8
Trina Gulliver 74.97	3
4	Deta Hedman 72.58	1
Kevin Painter 85.34	8
5	Glen Durrant 87.38	7
Q	Jim McEwan 86.58	9
2	Leonard Gates 85.49	9
RQ	Colin McGarry 86.03	7
7	John Henderson 80.00	4
David Cameron 84.07	8
3	Phil Taylor 80.64	9
John Part 73.41	7
6	Scott Mitchell 94.74	6
Q	Paul Hogan 94.96	8

Quarter-finals (best of 15 legs); 3 September
Neil Duff 92.38	11
8	Richie Howson 89.37	9
Kevin Painter 82.82	7
Q	Jim McEwan 84.92	9
2	Leonard Gates 101.28	11
David Cameron 95.79	9
3	Phil Taylor 84.72	6
Q	Paul Hogan 93.68	8

Semi-finals (best of 17 legs); 3 September
Neil Duff 83.46	5
Jim McEwan 85.83	9
2	Leonard Gates 95.60	9
Paul Hogan 91.91	7

Final (best of 17 legs); 3 September
Jim McEwan 87.93	6
2	Leonard Gates 92.24	9
