= 2023 World Seniors Darts Champion of Champions =

2023 JENNINGSbet World Seniors Champion of Champions

Tournament information
- Dates: 25–26 March 2023
- Venue: Viva!
- Location: Blackpool
- Country: England
- Organisation(s): WSDT
- Format: Legs
- Prize fund: £24,000
- Winner's share: £10,000
- High checkout: 150 David Cameron (Semi-finals)

Champion(s)
- Leonard Gates

The 2023 JENNINGSbet World Seniors Champion of Champions was the first staging of the World Seniors Champion of Champions tournament, organised by the World Seniors Darts Tour. The tournament took place at Viva!, Blackpool, England, from 25 to 26 March 2023. It featured a field of 8 players.

Leonard Gates won his first World Seniors title, defeating Richie Howson 13–10 in the final.

== Prize money ==
Position (no. of players)		Prize money (Total: £24,000)
Winner	(1)	£10,000
Runner-up	(1)	£5,000
Semi-finalists	(2)	£2,500
Quarter-finalists	(4)	£1,000

== Qualification ==
Seven players were invited to the event, four of which were seeded, with one place available to a 'Golden Ticket Winner'. The qualifying event was held the day before the event, with Leonard Gates being the winner. 76 players entered the qualifying event.

4 seeded Players
1. Robert Thornton (Quarter-finals)
2. Phil Taylor (Quarter-finals)
3. Martin Adams (Semi-finals)
4. David Cameron (Semi-finals)

Invited Players
- Richie Howson (Runner-up)
- Trina Gulliver (Quarter-finals)
- Kevin Painter (Quarter-finals)

Golden Ticket Winner
- Leonard Gates (Winner)

== Draw ==
The draw was made during the 2023 World Seniors Darts Championship on 12 February 2023.

Quarter-finals (best of 19 legs); 25 March
1	Robert Thornton 86.45	6
Richie Howson 82.79	10
4	David Cameron 80.76	10
Kevin Painter 75.99	5
2	Phil Taylor 82.79	8
Q	Leonard Gates 89.24	10
3	Martin Adams 87.21	10
Trina Gulliver 79.11	7

Semi-finals (best of 25 legs); 26 March
Richie Howson 93.87	13
4	David Cameron 89.37	11
Q	Leonard Gates 90.71	13
3	Martin Adams 88.93	11

Final (best of 25 legs); 26 March
Richie Howson 89.88	10
Q	Leonard Gates 90.55	13

== Broadcast Rights ==
The tournament was shown live on Channel 5 in the UK, And nearly 500,000 viewers turned in.
