= Kevin Painter =

English darts player (born 1967)

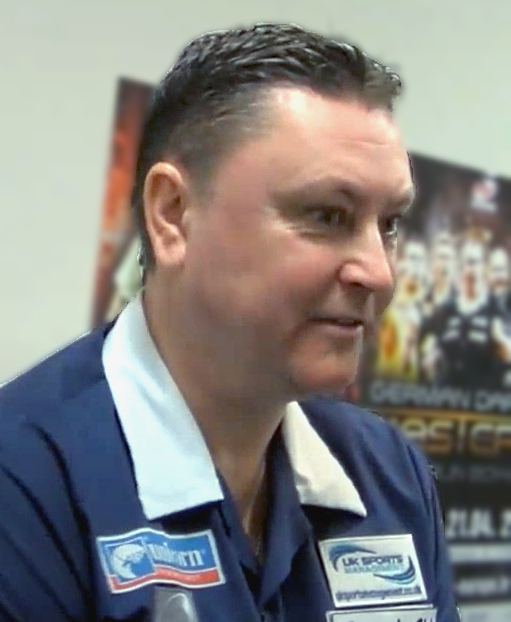
- Painter in 2014

Personal information
- Nickname: "The Artist"
- Born: 12 July 1967 (age 59) Billericay, Essex, England
- Home town: Rugby, Warwickshire, England

Sport
- Sport: Darts
- Playing since: 1982
- Darts: 24g Winmau Signature
- Laterality: Right-handed
- Walk-on music: "I Predict a Riot" by Kaiser Chiefs preceded by the intro to "The Greatest Show" by The Greatest Showman

Organisation (see split in darts)
- BDO: 1992–2001
- PDC: 2001– (Tour Card: 2011–2018)

WDF major events – best performances
- World Championship: Quarter-final: 2000, 2001
- World Masters: Quarter-final: 2001
- World Trophy: Last 32: 2007
- Int. Darts League: Preliminary Round: 2007
- Finder Masters: Quarter-final: 2001

PDC premier events – best performances
- World Championship: Runner-up: 2004
- World Matchplay: Quarter-final: 2010
- World Grand Prix: Quarter-final: 2001, 2003, 2004, 2009, 2014
- UK Open: Semi-final: 2009
- Grand Slam: Quarter-final: 2007, 2009, 2012
- European Championship: Last 16: 2012, 2013
- Premier League: 7th: 2012
- Championship League: Runner-up: 2008
- Desert Classic: Semi-final: 2004
- US Open/WSoD: Last 16: 2006, 2007
- PC Finals: Winner (1): 2011
- Masters: Last 16: 2013

WSDT major events – best performances
- World Championship: Semi-final: 2022, 2023
- World Matchplay: Semi-final: 2022
- World Masters: Last 16: 2023
- Champions: Quarter-final: 2023

Other tournament wins
- Years
| BDO British Open | 1997 |
| Bob Anderson Classic | 2002 |
| England Open | 1995 |
| Sheppey Darts Classic | 2004 |
| Swedish Open | 2000 |
| ADC European Championship Belt | 2022 |
UK Open Regionals (x2)
| 2004, 2006 |

Kevin Painter (born 12 July 1967) is an English darts player and former professional competitor. Nicknamed "The Artist", he competed in the British Darts Organisation (BDO) from 1992 to 2001 before joining the Professional Darts Corporation (PDC), where he remained a regular on the professional circuit until 2018.

Painter was runner-up to Phil Taylor in the 2004 PDC World Darts Championship, losing 7–6 in a sudden-death leg in a final widely regarded as one of the most memorable matches in darts history. He won his only televised PDC major title at the 2011 Players Championship Finals and subsequently competed in the 2012 Premier League. After announcing his retirement from professional darts in 2021, he continued to compete in seniors and other events, reaching the semi-finals of the World Seniors Darts Championship in both 2022 and 2023.

== Darts career ==
=== BDO ===
Painter began playing darts around the age of 17 and represented Essex at county level. He made his televised World Championship debut at the 1994 BDO World Darts Championship, losing 3–2 to Kevin Kenny in the first round. He reached the second round the following year, where he lost to Martin Adams, but enjoyed success elsewhere in 1995 by winning the inaugural England Open. He added the British Open title in 1997.

Painter reached his first BDO World Championship quarter-final in 2000, losing 5–2 to eventual champion Ted Hankey. He also won the Swedish Open that year and made his debut in a PDC event at the 2000 World Grand Prix, reaching the second round before losing 3–2 to Phil Taylor. Despite this appearance, he initially remained a BDO player.

At the 2001 BDO World Darts Championship, Painter again reached the quarter-finals, losing 5–2 to Andy Fordham. He also made the quarter-finals of the World Masters and the Zuiderduin Masters that year. His growing involvement with the PDC included a notable victory over Taylor in the first round of the 2001 World Grand Prix, ending Taylor's unbeaten record in the tournament. Painter progressed to the quarter-finals before losing to Dennis Smith. He subsequently moved to the PDC circuit.

=== PDC ===
==== 2002–2005: World Championship runner-up ====
Painter made his PDC World Championship debut at the 2002 tournament, losing in the first round to Ronnie Baxter. His results improved significantly at the 2003 World Championship, where he reached the semi-finals before losing 6–4 to eventual champion John Part.

His most notable World Championship performance came in 2004. Seeded tenth, Painter defeated Paul Williams, Ronnie Baxter, Mark Dudbridge and former world champion Bob Anderson to reach his first world final. Facing Taylor, he established a 4–1 lead in sets before his opponent fought back. The match eventually reached 6–6 in sets and 5–5 in legs in the deciding set, requiring a sudden-death leg. Taylor won the final leg to secure a 7–6 victory, while Painter finished as runner-up after coming close to winning his first world title.

Painter continued to perform well in 2004, reaching the quarter-finals of the UK Open and semi-finals of the Las Vegas Desert Classic. At the 2005 World Championship, he reached the quarter-finals but was defeated 5–1 by Taylor. He also made the quarter-finals of the 2005 Las Vegas Desert Classic. However, a leg injury disrupted his schedule and affected his form.

==== 2006–2010: Decline and resurgence ====
Painter reached another World Championship quarter-final in 2006, again losing to Taylor, and won a UK Open regional qualifying event. However, his results deteriorated during the year and he dropped out of the world's top 16. At the 2007 PDC World Darts Championship, he suffered a first-round defeat to former practice partner Colin Osborne.

His form improved towards the end of 2007. He reached the quarter-finals of the inaugural Grand Slam of Darts and enjoyed a successful run at the 2008 PDC World Darts Championship. After defeating defending champion Raymond van Barneveld in the third round, Painter reached the semi-finals before losing 6–2 to eventual champion John Part.

Although his televised results were inconsistent during 2008, Painter remained competitive on the PDC Pro Tour. In 2009, he reached the semi-finals of the UK Open, defeating Dennis Priestley and Alan Tabern before losing 10–7 to Colin Osborne. He also made the quarter-finals of both the World Grand Prix and Grand Slam of Darts.

At the 2010 World Matchplay, Painter produced a comeback from 8–2 down to defeat Colin Lloyd 11–9 in the first round. He subsequently beat Mark Walsh 14–12 to reach his first World Matchplay quarter-final. His run ended with a 16–4 defeat to Phil Taylor.

==== 2011–2014: First PDC major title ====
After a disappointing start to 2011, including a first-round exit from the World Championship, Painter achieved the biggest success of his PDC career at the Players Championship Finals in December. He defeated Colin Osborne, Gary Anderson and Mervyn King before recovering from 9–6 down to beat Scott Rand 10–9 in the semi-finals. Painter then defeated Mark Webster 13–9 in the final to win his first televised PDC major title and collect £60,000 in prize money. The victory lifted him into the world's top ten.

His major victory earned him a wildcard invitation to the 2012 Premier League, his only appearance in the competition. Despite recording victories over Gary Anderson, Simon Whitlock, Andy Hamilton and Adrian Lewis, he finished seventh out of eight players. Later in 2012, Painter reached the quarter-finals of the Grand Slam of Darts, losing 16–12 to Dean Winstanley. He was unable to defend his Players Championship Finals title, losing to Michael van Gerwen in the first round.

In 2013, Painter reached the third round of the World Championship, where he lost to Adrian Lewis. He also made the last 16 of the European Championship, World Matchplay and World Grand Prix. His most notable performance of the season came at Players Championship 12, where he reached his first PDC ranking final since his 2011 major victory, but was whitewashed 6–0 by Kim Huybrechts.

Painter reached the third round of the 2014 World Championship, losing 4–0 to Simon Whitlock. He subsequently enjoyed two major quarter-final appearances, at the UK Open and World Grand Prix. At the latter event, he recovered from two sets down to defeat Adrian Lewis 3–2 in the second round, before losing by the same scoreline to Gary Anderson in the quarter-finals.

==== 2015–2018: Final years on the PDC Pro Tour ====
Painter's results declined during the following seasons. At the 2015 World Championship, he established a 3–1 lead against Spanish qualifier Cristo Reyes in the second round, but lost 4–3. He failed to qualify for the World Matchplay for the first time since joining the PDC and missed the remaining major tournaments that year, although he retained a place in the world's top 32.

At the 2016 World Championship, Painter defeated Kim Viljanen before losing 4–1 to Phil Taylor in the second round. He continued to fall down the PDC Order of Merit, dropping outside the top 32 during the year.

Painter qualified for the 2017 World Championship following the withdrawal of Kyle Anderson. He defeated Jamie Caven 3–1 in the first round but again lost to Taylor, this time 4–0 in the second round. Despite his declining ranking, Painter reached the final of Players Championship 17 in August 2017, his first PDC ranking final for almost four years. He defeated Gerwyn Price and Jermaine Wattimena in the closing rounds before losing 6–2 to Kyle Anderson in the final.

Painter made his final appearance at the PDC World Championship in 2018, losing 3–0 to Mensur Suljović in the first round. He subsequently struggled to qualify for major tournaments and lost his PDC Tour Card at the end of the 2018 season, ending his long spell as a regular participant on the professional circuit.

==== 2019–2021: Challenge Tour and retirement from professional darts ====
Painter attempted to regain his Tour Card at the 2019 PDC Qualifying School. On the final day, he reached the semi-finals after defeating Gavin Carlin 5–4 in the quarter-finals, but lost 5–2 to Kirk Shepherd. The defeat prevented him from securing an immediate return to the Pro Tour.

Without a Tour Card, Painter competed on the PDC Challenge Tour in 2019 and 2020. His best result during this period was a quarter-final appearance at the fifth Challenge Tour event of 2020, where he lost to Maikel Verberk.

Painter returned to Q-School in 2021 and advanced to the final stage, but again failed to regain a Tour Card. On 17 February 2021, he announced his retirement from professional darts after approximately 25 years at the highest level. Painter explained that he no longer wished to continue the demands of Q-School and the Challenge Tour, although he remained open to exhibitions and other forms of competitive darts.

=== World Seniors Darts Tour and later career (2022–present) ===
Painter returned to televised competition at the inaugural 2022 World Seniors Darts Championship. He defeated Tony O'Shea and Wayne Warren before recording a 3–0 quarter-final victory over his long-time rival Phil Taylor. However, he lost 4–2 to eventual champion Robert Thornton in the semi-finals.

Later in 2022, he suffered a 4–3 preliminary-round defeat to David Cameron at the World Seniors Masters. At the inaugural World Seniors Matchplay, Painter again reached the semi-finals. He defeated Colin McGarry 8–5 in the quarter-finals before losing 12–10 to Phil Taylor, having missed opportunities to win the match.

Painter repeated his World Seniors Championship semi-final appearance in 2023. He defeated Ronnie Baxter, Dennis Harbour and Mark Dudbridge, but was once again eliminated by Robert Thornton, losing 3–0 in the semi-finals.

He also reached the quarter-finals of the inaugural World Seniors Champion of Champions, losing 10–5 to David Cameron. At the 2023 World Seniors Masters, he was defeated 4–3 by John Part in the first round. Later that year, Painter progressed to the quarter-finals of the World Seniors Matchplay, where he lost 9–7 to Jim McEwan.

At the 2024 World Seniors Championship, Painter recovered from two sets down to defeat Jim McEwan 3–2 in the opening round before losing 3–1 to eventual champion John Henderson in the second round. He also competed in the 2024 World Seniors Matchplay, where he was defeated 8–3 by David Cameron in the first round.

Painter suffered another early exit at the 2025 World Seniors Darts Championship, losing 3–2 to Richie Burnett in the first round after having led by two sets. He also participated in the 2025 World Seniors Champion of Champions, losing 5–2 to Mervyn King in the opening round.

Despite his earlier retirement from the professional circuit, Painter continued playing competitive darts. In 2026, he entered the PDC Qualifying School, explaining that his primary intention was to gain match practice and qualify to play on the Challenge Tour rather than to pursue another Tour Card. In an interview published in February 2026, he discussed a prolonged struggle with dartitis, which he associated with anxiety and stress, and said that changes to his throwing routine had helped him make significant progress.

Painter competed in several Challenge Tour events during 2026, reaching the last 32 at Event 16 in Milton Keynes in August. He also appeared in the MODUS Super Series during the year, continuing to participate in competitive darts outside the main PDC Pro Tour.

== Outside of darts ==
Painter has lived in Rugby, Warwickshire. He was previously in a long-term relationship with former darts player Janine Gough, with whom he has a daughter, Madison Elise Painter, born in 2005. The couple separated in 2016. Gough, who is from Swansea, won the Girls' World Masters in 1999 and 2000.

Before becoming a professional darts player, Painter worked as a builder. He also regularly practised with fellow professional Matthew Edgar.

Painter is a supporter of Ipswich Town F.C. and has held a season ticket and shares in the club. He has frequently worn a blue shirt during matches in recognition of his support for the team.

In 2012, Painter joined the seven other players competing in the Premier League Darts to record the charity single "Got My Ticket for the Darts" with Chas Hodges and his band. The song was released on 18 May 2012, following its premiere at the Premier League play-offs at The O2 Arena in London the previous evening. Proceeds from the single were intended to benefit Haven House Children's Hospice.

Painter has also appeared as a playable character in several darts video games, including PDC World Championship Darts 2008, PDC World Championship Darts 2009 and PDC World Championship Darts Pro Tour.

== Controversy ==
Painter had a long-standing rivalry with Phil Taylor, which attracted attention following Painter's victory over Taylor at the 2001 World Grand Prix and their closely contested final at the 2004 PDC World Darts Championship, which Taylor won 7–6.

Tensions between the players resurfaced during their quarter-final at the 2005 PDC World Darts Championship. Painter missed several attempts to finish legs on the bullseye, while Taylor subsequently won the final leg with a bullseye checkout. Painter interpreted Taylor's finish as a provocation, and the two exchanged words following the match. The confrontation was later recalled by television presenter Helen Chamberlain, who had been working on Sky Sports' darts coverage at the tournament.

In April 2008, Painter was involved in another incident during the Holland Masters, a non-televised PDC tournament. During his quarter-final against Adrian Lewis, an argument between the players resulted in both being disqualified by the tournament director. Their disqualification allowed Colin Osborne to advance directly to the semi-finals.

In July 2008, the Darts Regulation Authority imposed disciplinary sanctions on both players. Painter was fined £200 and received a three-month suspension, with two months suspended. Lewis was fined £400 and received a six-month suspension, with four months suspended. Both players were given 28 days to appeal the decisions. Painter also received a separate £100 fine for using offensive language during the Antwerp Darts Trophy earlier that year.

== World Championship results ==
=== BDO ===
- 1994: First round (lost to Kevin Kenny 2–3)
- 1995: Second round (lost to Martin Adams 0–3)
- 1996: First round (lost to Ronnie Baxter 2–3)
- 1998: Second round (lost to Richie Burnett 1–3)
- 1999: Second round (lost to Ronnie Baxter 0–3)
- 2000: Quarter-finals (lost to Ted Hankey 2–5)
- 2001: Quarter-finals (lost to Andy Fordham 2–5)

=== PDC ===
- 2002: First round (lost to Ronnie Baxter 2–4)
- 2003: Semi-finals (lost to John Part 4–6)
- 2004: Runner-up (lost to Phil Taylor 6–7)
- 2005: Quarter-finals (lost to Phil Taylor 1–5)
- 2006: Quarter-finals (lost to Phil Taylor 1–5)
- 2007: First round (lost to Colin Osborne 1–3)
- 2008: Semi-finals (lost to John Part 2–6)
- 2009: Third round (lost to Phil Taylor 1–4)
- 2010: Third round (lost to Raymond van Barneveld 1–4)
- 2011: First round (lost to Brendan Dolan 0–3)
- 2012: Third round (lost to John Part 2–4)
- 2013: Third round (lost to Adrian Lewis 2–4)
- 2014: Third round (lost to Simon Whitlock 0–4)
- 2015: Second round (lost to Cristo Reyes 3–4)
- 2016: Second round (lost to Phil Taylor 1–4)
- 2017: Second round (lost to Phil Taylor 0–4)
- 2018: First round (lost to Mensur Suljović 0–3)

=== WSDT ===
- 2022: Semi-finals (lost to Robert Thornton 2–4)
- 2023: Semi-finals (lost to Robert Thornton 0–3)
- 2024: Second round (lost to John Henderson 1–3)
- 2025: First round (lost to Richie Burnett 2–3)

== Career finals ==
=== BDO major finals: 1 (1 title) ===
| Outcome | No. | Year | Championship | Opponent in the final | Score (Note: (l) = score in legs, (s) = score in sets.) |
|---|---|---|---|---|---|
| Winner | 1. | 1997 | British Matchplay | (England) Steve Beaton | 3–0 (s) |

=== PDC major finals: 2 (1 title) ===
Legend
World Championship (0–1)
Players Championship Finals (1–0)

| Outcome | No. | Year | Championship | Opponent in the final | Score |
|---|---|---|---|---|---|
| Runner-up | 1. | 2004 | World Championship | Phil Taylor | 6–7 (s) |
| Winner | 1. | 2011 | Players Championship Finals | Mark Webster | 13–9 (l) |

== Career statistics ==
Performance Table Legend
| W | Won the tournament | F | Finalist | SF | Semifinalist | QF | Quarterfinalist | #R; RR; Prel. | Lost in # round Round-robin; Preliminary round | DQ | Disqualified |
| DNQ | Did not qualify | DNP | Did not participate | WD | Withdrew | NH | Tournament not held | #R; RR; Prel. | Lost in # round Round-robin; Preliminary round | NYF | Not yet founded |

== Performance timeline ==
=== BDO ===
| Tournament | 1993 | 1994 | 1995 | 1996 | 1997 | 1998 | 1999 | 2000 | 2001 | 2007 |
BDO Ranked televised events
| World Championship | DNQ | 1R | 2R | 1R | DNQ | 2R | 2R | QF | QF | PDC |
| World Masters | 1R | 4R | 2R | | 4R | 3R | 2R | 1R | QF | PDC |
| European Masters | Not held | | QF | Not held | | | | | | |
| Zuiderduin Masters | Not held | | | | | | | DNP | QF | PDC |
| World Darts Trophy | Not held | | | | | | | | | 1R |
| International Darts League | Not held | | | | | | | | | RR |

=== WSDT ===
| Tournament | 2022 | 2023 | 2024 | 2025 |
|---|---|---|---|---|
WSDT Televised events
| World Seniors Darts Championship | SF | SF | 2R | 1R |
| World Seniors Masters | Prel. | 1R | DNP | NH |
| World Seniors Matchplay | SF | QF | 1R | NH |
| Champion of Champions | NH | QF | DNP | 1R |

=== PDC ===
| Tournament | 2000 | 2001 | 2002 | 2003 | 2004 | 2005 | 2006 | 2007 | 2008 | 2009 | 2010 | 2011 | | 2012 | 2013 | 2014 | 2015 | 2016 | 2017 | 2018 |
PDC Ranked televised events
| World Championship | Non-PDC | | 1R | SF | F | QF | QF | 1R | SF | 3R | 3R | 1R | | 3R | 3R | 3R | 2R | 2R | 2R | 1R |
| UK Open | Not held | | | 3R | QF | 4R | 3R | 6R | 3R | SF | 4R | 3R | | 3R | 5R | QF | 3R | 2R | 3R | DNQ |
| World Matchplay | DNP | 1R | 2R | 1R | 2R | 1R | 2R | 2R | 1R | 2R | QF | 1R | | 1R | 2R | 1R | Did not qualify | | | |
| World Grand Prix | 2R | QF | 2R | QF | QF | 2R | 1R | 1R | 2R | QF | 2R | 1R | | 2R | 2R | QF | Did not qualify | | | |
| Grand Slam of Darts | Not held | | | | | | | QF | RR | QF | DNQ | DNQ | | QF | RR | Did not qualify | | | | |
| European Championship | Not held | | | | | | | | 1R | 1R | DNQ | DNQ | | 2R | 2R | Did not qualify | | | | |
| Players Championship Finals | Not held | | | | | | | | | 2R | 2R | 2R | W | 1R | 1R | 1R | DNQ | 1R | 1R | DNQ |
PDC Non-ranked televised events
| Premier League Darts | Not held | | | | | Did not participate | | | | | | | | 7th | Did not participate | | | | | |
| Championship League Darts | Not held | | | | | | | | F | Did not qualify | | | | | | Not held | | | | |
| The Masters | Not held | | | | | | | | | | | | | | 1R | Did not qualify | | | | |
Past major events
| Las Vegas Desert Classic | NH | | 1R | DNQ | SF | QF | 1R | 1R | 1R | 2R | Not held | | | | | | | | | |
| World Series of Darts | Not held | | | | | | 2R | Not held | | | | | | | | | | | | |
| US Open | Not held | | | | | | | 2R | Not held | | | | | | | | | | | |
| Year-end ranking | NR | | 14 | 10 | 7 | 7 | 12 | 15 | 17 | 15 | 18 | 22 | | 15 | 13 | 20 | 30 | 46 | 44 | 68 |

==== PDC European Tour ====
| Season | 1 | 2 | 3 | 4 | 5 | 6 | 7 | 8 | 9 | 10 | 11 | 12 | 13 |
|---|---|---|---|---|---|---|---|---|---|---|---|---|---|
| 2012 | ADO; 3R | GDC; 3R | EDO; 2R | GDM; 1R | DDM; 2R | | | | | | | | |
| 2013 | UKM; 2R | EDT; 2R | EDO; 2R | ADO; 2R | GDT; QF | GDC; QF | GDM; 3R | DDM; 2R | | | | | |
| 2014 | GDC; 2R | DDM; 3R | DNQ | | GDT; 2R | EDO; SF | EDGP; 1R | EDT; 2R | | | | | |
| 2015 | DNQ | GDT; 2R | Did not qualify | | | | EDT; 3R | EDM; 2R | DNQ | | | | |
| 2016 | DDM; 2R | GDM; 3R | GDT; 1R | EDM; 1R | DNQ | | IDO; 1R | DNQ | | GDC; 2R | | | |
| 2017 | GDC; 3R | Did not qualify | | | | | | | | | | EDT; 1R | |
| 2018 | Did not qualify | | | | | | | | | | DDC; 2R | DNQ | |

==== PDC Players Championships ====
| Season | 1 | 2 | 3 | 4 | 5 | 6 | 7 | 8 | 9 | 10 | 11 | 12 | 13 | 14 | 15 | 16 | 17 | 18 | 19 | 20 | 21 | 22 | 23 | 24 | 25 | 26 | 27 | 28 | 29 | 30 | 31 | 32 | 33 | 34 | 35 | 36 | 37 |
|---|---|---|---|---|---|---|---|---|---|---|---|---|---|---|---|---|---|---|---|---|---|---|---|---|---|---|---|---|---|---|---|---|---|---|---|---|---|
| 2004 | DNP | NEW; 3R | DUB; 3R | ROT; 1R | EDI; 3R | | | | | | | | | | | | | | | | | | | | | | | | | | | | | | | | |
| 2005 | IOW; 1R | IOW; 3R | BLA; 2R | NEW; 4R | DUB; 4R | IRV; 1R | LIS; QF | LIS; 2R | | | | | | | | | | | | | | | | | | | | | | | | | | | | | |
| 2006 | BLA; 2R | DNP | HAY; 4R | BLA; 4R | NEW; 4R | DUB; QF | IRV; 4R | LIS; 2R | LIS; 2R | | | | | | | | | | | | | | | | | | | | | | | | | | | | |
| 2007 | GIB; 3R | GIB; 3R | BAD; 4R | TEM; 3R | SCH; 3R | HEE; QF | HAY; 3R | HAY; 3R | LVE; 4R | BLA; 2R | ATL; 2R | CAS; 4R | CHI; QF | NEW; 3R | DUB; 2R | IRV; 4R | KIR; SF | KIL; 2R | LIS; 3R | LIS; 3R | | | | | | | | | | | | | | | | | |
| 2008 | GIB; QF | GIB; QF | BRE; 1R | WIG; 1R | BAD; 3R | BAD; 3R | TEL; 2R | TEM; 2R | GLA; 2R | SCH; 4R | BRI; 3R | BRI; F | LVE; 4R | BLA; 4R | DNP | | ATL; 3R | VEL; QF | VEL; QF | DRO; 1R | CHI; 2R | NEW; 2R | NEW; 2R | DUB; 3R | DUB; 3R | IRV; 3R | IRV; 1R | DIN; SF | KIL; QF | LEI; 2R | LEI; 2R | | | | | | |
| 2009 | DON; 4R | GIB; QF | GIB; 2R | GLA; 3R | GLA; SF | IRV; 3R | WIG; 3R | BRE; 2R | COV; 2R | NUL; QF | NUL; 2R | TAU; 4R | DER; 3R | NEW; 1R | BAR; 2R | BAR; 2R | DIN; 3R | DIN; 2R | LVE; 4R | DNP | ONT; 1R | ATL; 3R | SAL; QF | SAL; QF | DUB; 3R | DUB; 2R | KIL; 3R | NUL; QF | NUL; 1R | IRV; 2R | IRV; 2R | | | | | | |
| 2010 | GIB; 3R | GIB; 2R | SWI; 3R | DER; 1R | GLA; SF | GLA; 3R | WIG; 4R | CRA; 3R | BAR; 1R | DER; QF | WIG; QF | WIG; 4R | SAL; 3R | SAL; 2R | BAR; 3R | BAR; 1R | HAA; 3R | HAA; QF | LVE; 2R | LVE; 3R | LVE; 3R | DNP | ONT; QF | ONT; QF | CRA; 1R | CRA; 4R | NUL; 1R | NUL; F | DUB; 1R | DUB; 2R | KIL; 2R | BAD; 3R | BAD; 2R | BAR; QF | BAR; 3R | DER; 4R | DER; 3R |
| 2011 | HAL; 3R | HAL; 1R | DER; 1R | DER; 2R | CRA; 4R | CRA; 4R | VIE; QF | VIE; 4R | CRA; 3R | CRA; 3R | BAR; 3R | BAR; 3R | NUL; 3R | NUL; QF | ONT; 4R | ONT; F | DER; 4R | DER; 2R | NUL; 3R | NUL; QF | DUB; 2R | DUB; 2R | KIL; 3R | GLA; 4R | GLA; 3R | ALI; 4R | ALI; 2R | CRA; 2R | CRA; 3R | WIG; 2R | DNP | | | | | | |
| 2012 | ALI; 2R | ALI; 3R | REA; 2R | REA; 2R | CRA; 1R | CRA; 4R | BIR; 1R | BIR; 4R | CRA; 2R | CRA; 3R | BAR; 1R | DNP | DUB; 3R | DUB; 4R | KIL; 1R | KIL; 3R | CRA; QF | CRA; 3R | BAR; 1R | BAR; 1R | | | | | | | | | | | | | | | | | |
| 2013 | WIG; 4R | WIG; 2R | WIG; QF | WIG; 2R | CRA; SF | CRA; 1R | BAR; 1R | BAR; 2R | DUB; 4R | DUB; QF | KIL; 2R | KIL; F | DNP | | BAR; QF | BAR; 1R | | | | | | | | | | | | | | | | | | | | | |
| 2014 | BAR; 3R | BAR; 4R | CRA; 1R | CRA; 3R | WIG; 1R | WIG; 1R | WIG; 1R | WIG; 3R | CRA; 1R | CRA; 1R | COV; 4R | COV; 3R | CRA; 3R | CRA; 2R | DUB; 1R | DUB; 3R | CRA; 2R | CRA; 2R | COV; 1R | COV; 3R | | | | | | | | | | | | | | | | | |
| 2015 | BAR; QF | BAR; 1R | BAR; 2R | BAR; 2R | BAR; 1R | COV; 1R | COV; 1R | COV; 1R | CRA; 3R | CRA; 1R | BAR; 3R | BAR; 1R | WIG; 1R | WIG; 1R | BAR; 1R | BAR; 1R | DUB; 3R | DUB; 3R | COV; SF | COV; 2R | | | | | | | | | | | | | | | | | |
| 2016 | BAR; 1R | BAR; 1R | BAR; 2R | BAR; 2R | BAR; 3R | BAR; 4R | BAR; 1R | COV; 1R | COV; 2R | BAR; 1R | BAR; 2R | BAR; 4R | BAR; 1R | BAR; 1R | BAR; 2R | BAR; 1R | DUB; 4R | DUB; 1R | BAR; 2R | BAR; 1R | | | | | | | | | | | | | | | | | |
| 2017 | BAR; 1R | BAR; 3R | BAR; 1R | BAR; 2R | MIL; 2R | MIL; 2R | BAR; 3R | BAR; 1R | WIG; 2R | WIG; 2R | MIL; 1R | MIL; 1R | WIG; 1R | WIG; 2R | BAR; 2R | BAR; 1R | BAR; F | BAR; 1R | DUB; 2R | DUB; 1R | BAR; 3R | BAR; 1R | | | | | | | | | | | | | | | |
| 2018 | BAR; 2R | BAR; 1R | BAR; 3R | BAR; 2R | MIL; 1R | MIL; 1R | BAR; 2R | BAR; 1R | WIG; 1R | WIG; 1R | MIL; 2R | MIL; 2R | WIG; 3R | WIG; 1R | BAR; 1R | BAR; 2R | BAR; 3R | BAR; 1R | DUB; 1R | DUB; 2R | BAR; 1R | BAR; 4R | | | | | | | | | | | | | | | |

==== PDC Challenge Tour ====
| Season | 1 | 2 | 3 | 4 | 5 | 6 | 7 | 8 | 9 | 10 | 11 | 12 | 13 | 14 | 15 | 16 | 17 | 18 | 19 | 20 | 21 | 22 | 23 | 24 | Prize money | Ranking |
|---|---|---|---|---|---|---|---|---|---|---|---|---|---|---|---|---|---|---|---|---|---|---|---|---|---|---|
| 2019 | WIG; L128 | WIG; L256 | WIG; L128 | DNP | WIG; L32 | WIG; L16 | WIG; L128 | DNP | PET; L128 | PET; L256 | PET; L128 | Did not participate | | | | | | | | | | | | | £300 | 141st |
| 2020 | WIG; L256 | WIG; L128 | WIG; L512 | DNP | BAR; QF | BAR; L64 | BAR; L256 | BAR; L32 | BAR; L64 | BAR; L128 | | | | | | | | | | | | | | | £500 | 54th |
| 2024 | Did not participate | | | | | | | | | | | | LEI; L64 | LEI; L128 | Did not participate | | | | | | | | | | £75 | 258th |
| 2026 | MIL; L128 | MIL; L256 | MIL; L256 | MIL; L256 | DNP | LEI; L128 | LEI; L512 | LEI; L512 | LEI; L256 | LEI; L256 | Did not participate | | | | | MIL; L32 | MIL; L64 | MIL; L256 | MIL; L128 | MIL; L256 | Did not participate | | | | £350 | 197th |
