= 2024 World Seniors Darts Championship =

Tournament information
- Dates: 15–18 February 2024
- Venue: Circus Tavern
- Location: Purfleet, England
- Organisation(s): World Seniors Darts Tour
- Format: Sets
- Prize fund: £80,000
- Winner's share: £30,000
- High checkout: 170 David Cameron

Champion(s)
- John Henderson

The 2024 World Seniors Darts Championship was the third World Seniors Darts Championship organized by the World Seniors Darts Tour. The event took place at the Circus Tavern in Purfleet from 15 to 18 February 2024. The event was open to players over the age of 50, with the exception of current PDC Tour Card holders.

John Henderson won the title on his debut defeating Colin McGarry 5–0.

== Prize money ==
The prize fund for the event was £80,000, with £30,000 going to the champion.

| Position (no. of players) | | Prize money (Total: £80,000) |
|---|---|---|
| Winner | (1) | £30,000 |
| Runner-up | (1) | £13,000 |
| Semi-finalists | (2) | £4,500 |
| Quarter-finalists | (4) | £2,000 |
| Second round | (8) | £1,000 |
| First round | (16) | £750 |

== Qualifiers ==
Seeded players

1. Robert Thornton (second round)
2. Leonard Gates (first round)
3. Phil Taylor (first round)
4. Neil Duff (second round)
5. Martin Adams (second round)
6. Lisa Ashton (semi-finals)
7. Glen Durrant (first round)
8. Kevin Painter (second round)
9. Trina Gulliver (first round)
10. Richie Howson (second round)
11. Scott Mitchell (second round)
12. David Cameron (first round)
13. Terry Jenkins (first round)
14. Darryl Fitton (first round)
15. Keith Deller (first round)
16. ~~Tony O'Shea~~ (withdrew)

Invited players

- Manfred Bilderl (second round)
- Richie Burnett (second round)
- Mark Dudbridge (quarter-finals)
- Andy Hamilton (quarter-finals)
- Deta Hedman (first round)
- John Henderson (champion)
- (Wales) Michael Huntley (first round)
- Chris Mason (quarter-finals)
- Colin McGarry (runner-up)
- John Part (first round)

Qualifiers

- Martyn Turner (first round)
- Jim Long (semi-finals)
- Paul Hogan (quarter-finals)
- Jim McEwan (first round)
- (Wales) Richard Eirig Rowlands (first round)
- Matt Clark (first round)

== Draw ==
First round (best of 5 sets); 15–16 February
1 | Robert Thornton 88.96 | 3
Q | Martyn Turner 76.03 | 1
16 | Tony O'Shea | w/d
Andy Hamilton | w/o
9 | Trina Gulliver 70.47 | 1
John Henderson 82.32 | 3
8 | Kevin Painter 90.42 | 3
Q | Jim McEwan 98.58 | 2
5 | Martin Adams 80.57 | 3
Deta Hedman 77.31 | 2
12 | David Cameron 87.63 | 1
Q | Jim Long 90.80 | 3
13 | Terry Jenkins 81.38 | 1
Q | Paul Hogan 90.61 | 3
4 | Neil Duff 85.96 | 3
Q | Richard-Eirig Rowlands 82.83 | 2
3 | Phil Taylor 74.53 | 2
Manfred Bilderl 75.09 | 3
14 | Darryl Fitton 82.52 | 1
Chris Mason 85.86 | 3
11 | Scott Mitchell 86.54 | 3
Q | Matt Clark 85.55 | 1
6 | Lisa Ashton 86.58 | 3
Michael Huntley 81.39 | 2
7 | Glen Durrant 79.36 | 2
Mark Dudbridge 80.69 | 3
10 | Richie Howson 79.84 | 3
John Part 77.67 | 0
15 | Keith Deller 82.51 | 1
Richie Burnett 88.73 | 3
2 | Leonard Gates 82.67 | 1
Colin McGarry 85.35 | 3

Second round (best of 5 sets); 17 February
1 | Robert Thornton 82.66 | 2
Andy Hamilton 79.67 | 3
John Henderson 81.81 | 3
8 | Kevin Painter 81.11 | 1
5 | Martin Adams 82.81 | 0
Q | Jim Long 91.11 | 3
Q | Paul Hogan 79.30 | 3
4 | Neil Duff 77.78 | 0
Manfred Bilderl 77.94 | 2
Chris Mason 86.26 | 3
11 | Scott Mitchell 82.47 | 0
6 | Lisa Ashton 82.30 | 3
Mark Dudbridge 87.66 | 3
10 | Richie Howson 84.35 | 2
Richie Burnett 79.03 | 1
Colin McGarry 85.23 | 3

Quarter-finals (best of 5 sets); 18 February
Andy Hamilton 82.32 | 1
John Henderson 90.06 | 3
Q | Jim Long 89.54 | 3
Q | Paul Hogan 86.95 | 2
Chris Mason 79.14 | 1
6 | Lisa Ashton 75.29 | 3
Mark Dudbridge 83.49 | 1
Colin McGarry 86.14 | 3

Semi-finals (best of 5 sets); 18 February
John Henderson 92.91 | 3
Q | Jim Long 93.16 | 1
6 | Lisa Ashton 78.29 | 2
Colin McGarry 79.59 | 3

Final (best of 9 sets); 18 February
John Henderson 86.72 | 5
Colin McGarry 78.88 | 0
