= John Henderson (darts player) =

Scottish darts player (born 1973)

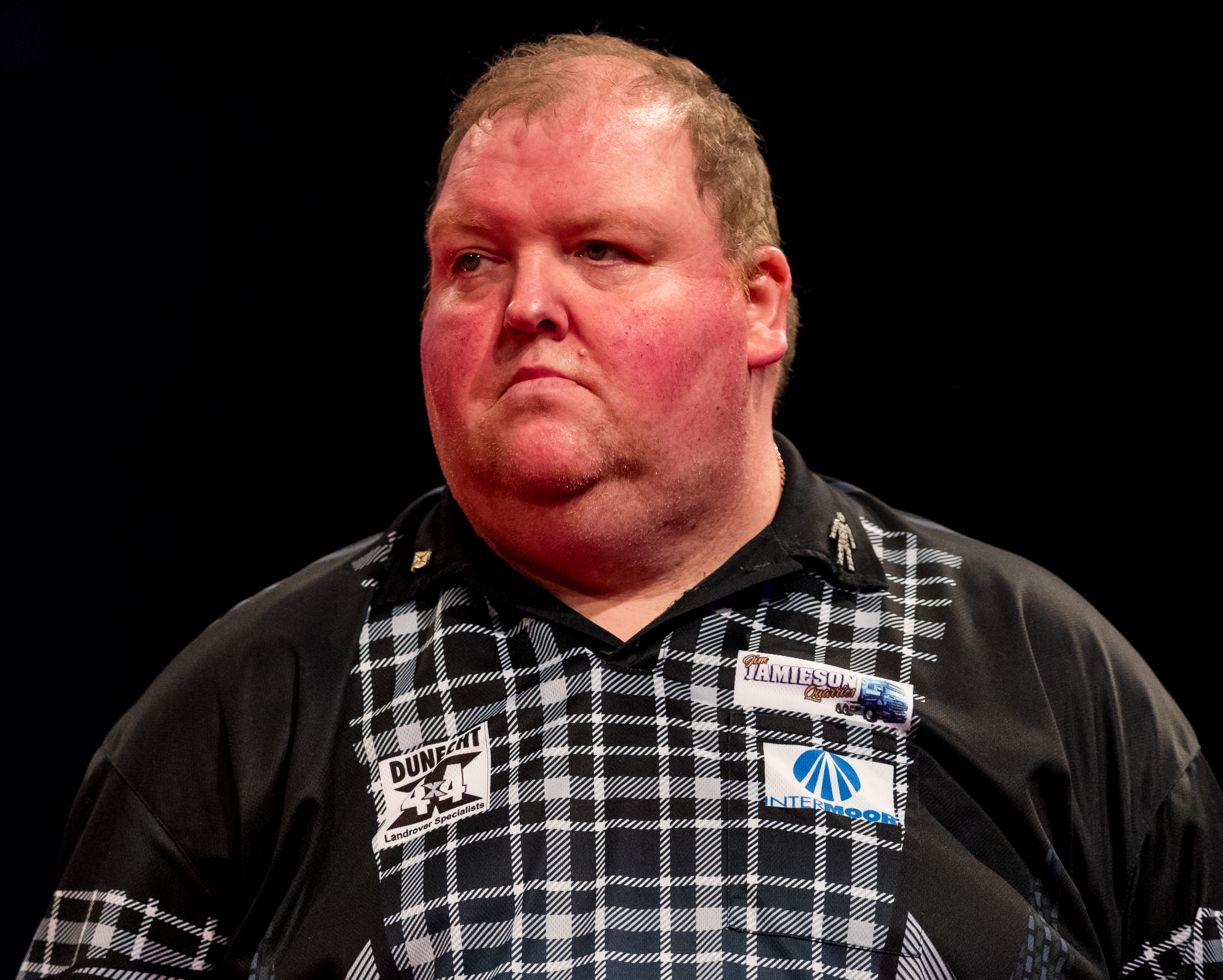
- Henderson in 2019

Personal information
- Nickname: Highlander
- Born: 4 May 1973 (age 53) Aberdeen, Scotland
- Home town: Huntly, Aberdeenshire, Scotland

Sport
- Sport: Darts
- Playing since: 1993
- Darts: 24g Red Dragon
- Laterality: Right-handed
- Walk-on music: "Rockin' All Over the World" by Status Quo

Organisation (see split in darts)
- BDO: 2004–2010
- PDC: 2002–2003; 2011–present (Tour Card: 2011–2022)

WDF major events – best performances
- World Championship: Last 16: 2005, 2010
- World Masters: Last 32: 2005
- Finder Masters: Last 24 Group: 2010

PDC premier events – best performances
- World Championship: Last 16: 2018
- World Matchplay: Last 16: 2011
- World Grand Prix: Semi-final: 2017
- UK Open: Last 16: 2013, 2015
- Grand Slam: Group Stage: 2010, 2021
- European Championship: Quarter-final: 2015
- Premier League: Challenger: 2019, 2020
- PC Finals: Last 16: 2019
- World Series Finals: Last 24: 2021

WSDT major events – best performances
- World Championship: Winner (1): 2024
- World Matchplay: Winner (1): 2024
- World Masters: Winner (1): 2024
- Champions: Quarter-final: 2024

Other tournament wins
- Years
World Cup of Darts – (Team event)	2021
Belgium Open	2009
British Open	2008
Didam Open	2009
German Open	2009
Granite City Open	2003
Hal Open	2010
Scotland National Ch'ships	2009
Scottish Masters	2004
Inverurie/Old Meldrum Open	2002
PDC Challenge Tour	2023 (x2)
World Seniors Target Open Series	2024

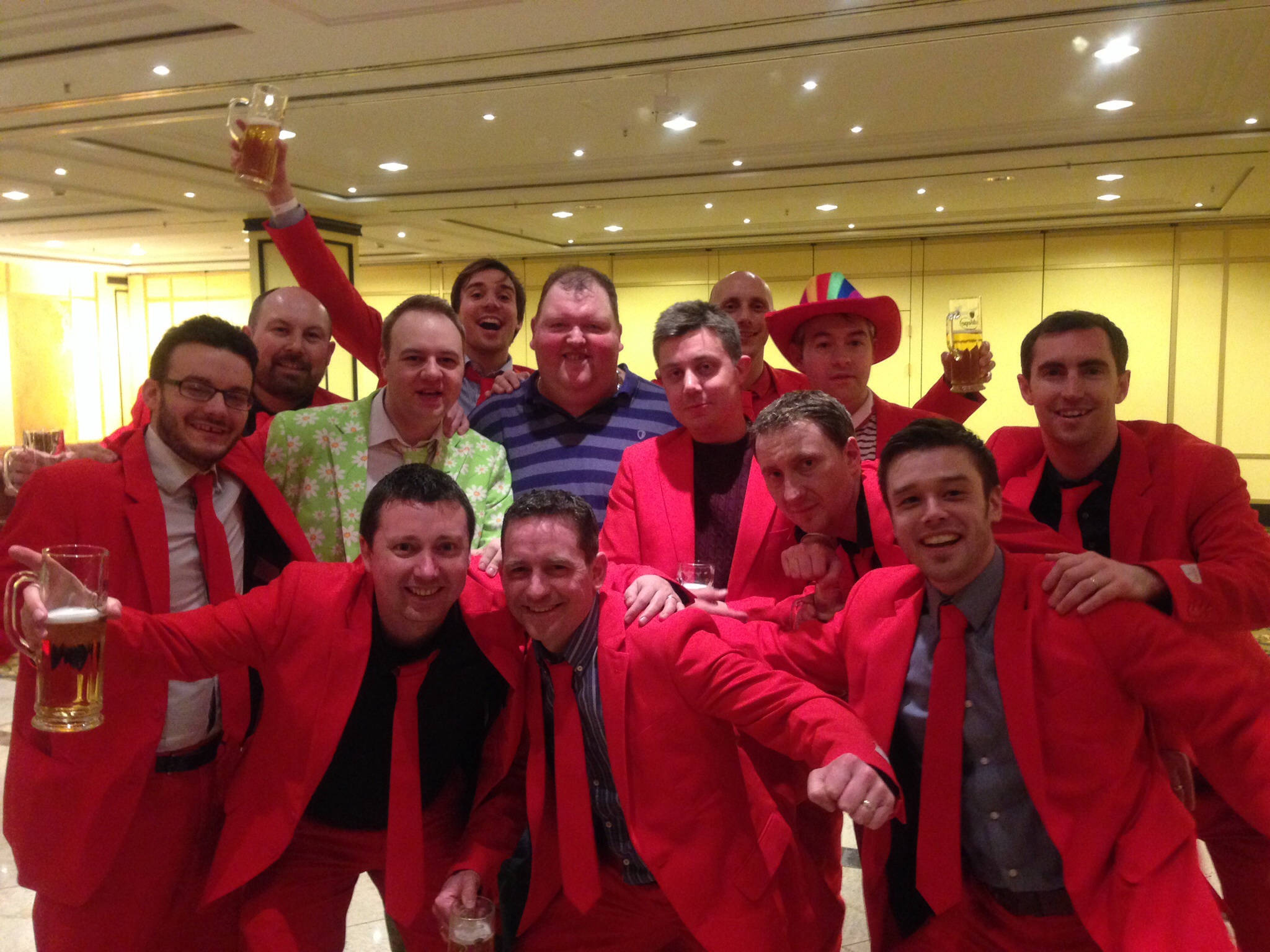
Henderson (centre, purple shirt) celebrating with his Red Army

John Henderson (born 4 May 1973) is a Scottish darts player who competes in Professional Darts Corporation (PDC) events.

He is the reigning World Seniors Matchplay and World Seniors Masters champion, as well as the 2024 World Seniors Darts Championship winner. Henderson also won the 2021 PDC World Cup of Darts partnering Peter Wright for Scotland. He reached the semi-finals at the 2017 World Grand Prix and the quarter-finals at the 2015 European Championship.

== Career ==
Henderson started out in the PDC circuit and played one tournament in Scotland as well as the 2003 UK Open where he lost in the first round, having won his preliminary match. He then qualified for the 2005 BDO World Darts Championship, where he beat Stephen Bunting in the first round before losing in round two to Martin Adams – hitting a record thirteen 180s (for a five-set match) in the 3–2 defeat. Henderson then reached the quarter-finals of the 2005 British Open and the last 32 of the 2005 Winmau World Masters.

Henderson reached the final of the 2007 British Open. He beat Tony O'Shea in the quarter-finals and Ted Hankey in the semis before losing to Gary Anderson in the final. This was followed however with failure to qualify for the 2008 BDO World Championship and an early exit from the 2007 World Masters.

=== 2008–2009 ===
2008 was a good year for Henderson, reaching the semi-finals of the Norway Open and the quarter-finals of the WDF Europe Cup. On 20 September 2008 Henderson captured his very first title, winning the 2008 British Open. He scored notable wins over Edwin Max and Dave Chisnall to earn a spot into the televised stages which were shown live on Setanta Sports. He then defeated Gary Robson in the quarter-finals and Mareno Michels in the semis before avenging his defeat over Anderson twelve months previously by beating him in the final to win the £3,000 top prize. The win also helped Henderson finish fourth in the BDO International Grand Prix, earning him another £2,750 for his efforts. He also shot up the world rankings as a result of the win, moving him into the WDF's top 20. He then captured the German Open in 2009, beating Stephen Bunting in the final which elevated Henderson to seven in the WDF rankings.

=== 2010–2011 ===
Henderson then qualified for the 2010 BDO World Championship, winning one of four places available from the Inter-Playoff Qualifiers in Bridlington. He was defeated in the second round by Scott Waites. Henderson failed to qualify for the 2011 tournament, but did qualify for the 2010 Grand Slam of Darts where he finished third in his group. After being defeated by Mervyn King he was accused of standing in front of the oche, however after watching the match again, King admitted that he had over-reacted and apologised to Henderson in a pre-match interview.

On 15 January 2011, Henderson came through qualifying at the PDC Q-School event and has therefore left the British Darts Organisation. On joining the PDC he said "It means everything to me the first two days were hard and I felt a lot of pressure today but to qualify, so I'm delighted I did it."

In the 2011 Derby championships, Henderson hit a nine-darter in his second leg of the second round beating Andy Hamilton 6–5 and earning £800.

Henderson qualified for the 2011 World Matchplay where he beat Colin Lloyd 10–7 in the first round, before losing to Andy Hamilton 13–11 in the second round. He defeated on form Justin Pipe 2–0 at the World Grand Prix 2011, he went on to reach the quarter finals losing to eventual runner up Brendan Dolan 4–1.

=== 2012–2020 ===
Henderson reached his first PDC World Championship in 2012, but was beaten by three-time World Champion, John Part, 0–3. He only managed to win 2 legs during the match, with Part stating afterwards that "John struggled and wasn't himself". His best result on the 2012 Pro Tour was in reaching the quarter-finals of the 16th Players Championship event, where he lost to Nick Fullwell 2–6. Henderson was beaten in the last 16 of the Qualifier for the 2013 World Championship. He was ranked world number 39 after the World Championship.

Henderson qualified for the 2013 UK Open by finishing 50th on the Order of Merit to enter the event in the second round. He enjoyed his best ever run in the tournament by beating Dave Place, Scott Rand and Kevin McDine to advance to the last 16. He played James Wade and lost 9–4. Henderson reached the quarter-finals of a Players Championship played in Killarney for the second consecutive year as he beat Mark Webster, Ian White and Justin Pipe before being whitewashed 6–0 by Darren Webster. He qualified for the 2014 World Championship through the ProTour Order of Merit having claimed the ninth of sixteen places that were available to non-qualified players. Henderson started his first round match brightly as he took a 2–0 lead against seventh seed Dave Chisnall which included a 132 finish of bull, bull, double 16. He threw for the match in the third set but lost the leg and the set as Chisnall fought back to level the game. Henderson survived four match darts from Chisnall in the final set as he pulled off a big shock win in a performance he rated as the best of his career. Another tight match followed against Mark Webster with Henderson missing three darts at tops to seal a 4–2 win, and then went on to lose the deciding set to bow out of the tournament 4–3.

At the 2014 UK Open, Henderson was beaten 5–1 by Jelle Klaasen in the second round. He beat Steve Hine 6–4, Peter Wright 6–5 and Simon Whitlock 6–2 (with an average of 106.12) to reach the quarter-finals of the German Darts Masters, where he lost 6–2 against Adrian Lewis. In the rest of the year he lost in the last 16 of two Players Championships and qualified for three European Tour events, losing in the second round in two and the opening round of the other.

The opening four sets in Henderson's first round 2015 World Championship match against Vincent van der Voort went with throw to send it into a deciding set. Van der Voort hit a crucial 157 finish with Henderson waiting on 80 for the match and from there the Dutchman won back-to-back 14 dart legs to knock him out. A pair of last 16 finishes helped Henderson enter the UK Open at the third round stage and he eliminated Steve Douglas 9–7 and then retained his composure when Daryl Gurney won five legs in a row to lead 8–7 by beating him 9–8. This matched Henderson's best ever run the event, but it came to a sudden end when he lost 9–2 against Peter Wright. At the German Darts Masters, Henderson defeated Michael Smith 6–4 and then averaged 102.48 in a 6–0 whitewash over Andrew Gilding. He improved upon that in the quarter-finals by averaging 107.72 during a 6–1 victory against Brendan Dolan and knocked out Adrian Lewis 6–4 to reach his first PDC final. Henderson played world number one Michael van Gerwen and he sent the match into a final leg decider, after being 3–0 down, which he lost without getting a dart for the title. He suffered first round exits at the World Matchplay (10–2 to Phil Taylor) and the World Grand Prix (2–0 in sets to Gary Anderson), but then defeated Robert Thornton 6–4 at the European Championship. Henderson then took advantage of a poor performance from Rowby-John Rodriguez in the second round to thrash him 10–2 and reach his first major quarter-final in over four years, where he lost 10–4 to Peter Wright.

After taking the opening set in his first round match at the 2016 World Championship, Henderson went on to lose 3–1 against Darren Webster. One semi-final and a quarter-final appearance in the qualifiers helped him finish 17th on the Order of Merit for the UK Open. Henderson saw off Magnus Caris 9–4, before losing 9–6 to Adrian Lewis in the fourth round. His second semi-final of the year was at the 14th Players Championship event and he was knocked out 6–4 by Michael van Gerwen. He was ousted 6–3 by Gary Anderson in the first round of the Players Championship Finals.

He won the opening two sets against Andrew Gilding in the first round of the 2017 World Championship, before it was levelled at 2–2. Henderson missed one match dart in the deciding set and it would eventually go to a sudden-death leg. Gilding won the bull to throw first and took the leg to eliminate Henderson.

Following Gary Anderson's withdrawal from the 2019 Premier League, Henderson was selected as one of nine 'contenders' to replace him. A great boost for his Red Army following of his fellow Aberdeen FC fans. He played a one-off match against No. 1 PDC-ranked Michael van Gerwen on night five in Aberdeen. The match resulted in a draw.

Henderson returned to the Premier League in 2020 under the new tag of 'Challenger', once again in Aberdeen. However, he was beaten by Nathan Aspinall.

=== 2021 ===
Henderson, alongside Peter Wright, won the 2021 PDC World Cup of Darts playing on behalf of Scotland. It was his first PDC Major Tournament win.

=== 2022 ===
Henderson failed to qualify for 2022 PDC World Darts Championship, missing this event for the first time since 2013. He continued to struggle throughout 2022, but was again nominated for the 2022 PDC World Cup of Darts, where he was defending the title alongside Peter Wright. Together they made it to the Quarterfinals, where they lost against England. At the end of the season he dropped out of top 64 of PDC Order of Merit, failing to qualify for the World Championship for a second time in a row and lost his Tour Card after the 2022 season.

=== 2023 ===
Henderson was unable to retain his Tour Card at UK Q-School and played on the PDC Challenge Tour. He secured two titles during the year and was battling for second place on the PDC Challenge Tour Order of Merit. After losing in an early round of the last PDC Challenge Tour event, Henderson had to hope that Andy Boulton, Cam Crabtree and Owen Bates would not make the final. Boulton and Crabtree dropped out at the last sixteen. Despite facing multiple match darts against Michael Warburton, Bates made it to the final and clinched second place, therefore Henderson did not get his Tour Card back via the Challenge Tour by just £175, finishing 3rd overall in the rankings. This result also denied Henderson the chance to qualify for the 2024 PDC World Darts Championship.

Aside from competing on the Challenge Tour, Henderson later made his World Seniors Darts debut at the 2023 World Seniors Darts Matchplay in September. He was eliminated in the first round to Canadian player David Cameron 8–4.

=== 2024 ===
Unable to win a Tour Card at Q-School, Henderson continued playing on the PDC Challenge Tour in 2024. He made a final at Challenge Tour 12, where he lost to 2012 BDO World Champion Christian Kist 6–3. Henderson also lost to eventual winners Danny Jansen and Noa-Lynn van Leuven in Challenge Tour's 2 and 6 respectively. Henderson ended the Challenge Tour in 11th place on the order of merit.

Henderson also accepted an invitation for the 2024 World Seniors Darts Championship. He became the World Seniors Darts champion at the first time of asking, defeated Colin McGarry 5–0 in the final. Henderson suffered a round 1 exit at the 2024 World Seniors Darts Champion of Champions in March, after losing to Andy Hamilton 10–8. Henderson good run of fortune returned at the 2024 World Seniors Darts Matchplay in October, beating defending champion Leonard Gates in the final 9–6. Henderson later claimed his third Seniors title at the 2024 World Seniors Masters in November, defeating fellow Scotsman Robert Thornton in the final in a deciding leg 6–5.

Henderson performance in the 2023 Challenge Tour allowed him to qualify for the 2024 UK Open. He made it to the third round of the tournament before losing to Gian van Veen 6–3.

=== 2025 ===
At the 2025 World Seniors Darts Championship, Henderson started off with a 3–2 victory over Chris Mason, before being knocked out of the quarterfinals to Welshman Derek Coulson 3–1. Henderson also suffered another quarterfinal exit at the 2025 World Seniors Champion of Champions to former BDO World Champion Richie Burnett 5–2. Henderson was due to start his defence of the World Seniors Matchplay in November against either Steve Beaton or Vincent van der Voort after their round 1 match. But the tournament never commenced, following the unexpected collapse of the WSD in August.

Henderson again competed on the PDC Challenge Tour, where he made one final in Challenge Tour 3, but suffered a whitewash defeat to Beau Greaves. Henderson ended the Challenge Tour 43rd on the order of merit.

Henderson lost to Graham Usher 6–3 in the first round at the 2025 UK Open.

Henderson has also made competitive appearances in the MODUS Super Series.

=== 2026 ===
Henderson made his 4th appearance on the PDC Challenge Tour.

== Personal life ==
Henderson is married to Veronica Hughes and has no children.

== World Championship results ==
=== BDO ===
- 2005: Second round (lost to Martin Adams 2–3)
- 2010: Second round (lost to Scott Waites 1–4)

=== PDC ===
- 2012: First round (lost to John Part 0–3)
- 2014: Second round (lost to Mark Webster 3–4)
- 2015: First round (lost to Vincent van der Voort 2–3)
- 2016: First round (lost to Darren Webster 1–3)
- 2017: First round (lost to Andrew Gilding 2–3)
- 2018: Third round (lost to Rob Cross 1–4)
- 2019: Third round (lost to Michael Smith 2–4)
- 2020: Third round (lost to Gerwyn Price 0–4)
- 2021: Second round (lost to Jonny Clayton 1–3)

=== WSDT ===
- 2024: Winner (beat Colin McGarry 5–0)
- 2025: Quarter-finals (lost to Derek Coulson 1–3)

== Career finals ==
=== PDC European tour finals: (1 runner-up) ===
Legend
Other (0–1)

Outcome	No.	Year	Championship	Opponent in the final	Score
Runner-up	1.	2015	German Darts Masters	Michael van Gerwen	5–6 (l)

=== PDC team finals: 1 (1 title) ===
Outcome	No.	Year	Championship	Team	Teammate	Opponents in the final	Score (Note: (l) = score in legs, (s) = score in sets, (m) = score in matches.)
Winner	1.	2021	World Cup of Darts	Scotland	Peter Wright	Austria – Mensur Suljović and Rowby-John Rodriguez	3–1 (m)

== Performance timeline ==
BDO

Tournament	2004	2005	2006	2007	2008	2009	2010
BDO Ranked televised events
BDO World Championship	DNQ	2R	DNQ				2R
World Masters	1R	3R	DNQ	3R	2R	2R	4R
Finder Darts Masters	Did not participate					RR	RR

PDC

Tournament	2003	2010	2011	2012	2013	2014	2015	2016	2017	2018	2019	2020	2021	2022	2023	2024	2025
PDC Ranked televised events
PDC World Championship	DNQ			1R	DNQ	2R	1R	1R	1R	3R	3R	3R	2R	DNQ			
UK Open	1R	DNQ	3R	2R	5R	2R	5R	4R	3R	3R	4R	4R	4R	3R	DNQ	3R	1R
World Matchplay	DNQ		2R	DNQ			1R	DNQ	1R	1R	1R	DNQ					
World Grand Prix	DNQ		QF	DNQ			1R	DNQ	SF	1R	1R	DNQ					
European Championship	NH	DNQ					QF	DNQ	1R	DNQ						DNP	
Grand Slam of Darts (Note: A non-ranked event until 2015.)	NH	RR	Did not qualify										RR	DNQ			
Players Championship Finals	NH	DNQ	1R	DNQ			1R	1R	2R	1R	3R	1R	DNQ				
PDC Non-ranked televised events
Premier League Darts	NH	Did not participate									C	C	DNP				
PDC World Cup of Darts	NH	DNQ	NH	Did not qualify								2R	W	QF	DNQ		
World Series of Darts Finals	NH				Did not qualify								1R	DNQ		DNP	
WSDT Televised events
World Seniors Darts Championship	Not yet founded													DNP		W	QF
Career statistics
Year-end ranking	Not ranked		44	39	48	43	32	31	29	23	30	41	63	83	165	134	NR

PDC European Tour

Season	1	2	3	4	5	6	7	8	9	10	11	12	13
2013	UKM; 1R	EDT; 1R	EDO; DNQ	ADO; 2R	GDT; 3R	GDC; 1R	GDM; DNQ	DDM; DNQ					
2014	GDC; DNQ	DDM; DNQ	GDM; QF	ADO; 2R	GDT; 2R	EDO; DNQ	EDG; 1R	EDT; DNQ					
2015	GDC; DNQ	GDT; DNQ	GDM; F	DDM; 2R	IDO; 1R	EDO; 2R	EDT; DNQ	EDM; DNQ	EDG; DNQ				
2016	DDM; 2R	GDM; DNQ	GDT; 2R	EDM; 3R	ADO; DNQ	EDO; 1R	IDO; DNQ	EDT; DNQ	EDG; DNQ	GDC; DNQ			
2017	GDC; DNQ	GDM; DNQ	GDO; 1R	EDG; 2R	GDT; 2R	EDM; 2R	ADO; 2R	EDO; QF	DDM; QF	GDG; DNQ	IDO; DNQ	EDT; DNQ	
2018	EDO; 3R	GDG; DNQ	GDO; DNQ	ADO; 1R	EDG; 2R	DDM; 2R	GDT; DNQ	DDO; 2R	EDM; DNQ	GDC; DNQ	DDC; DNQ	IDO; 2R	EDT; 3R
2019	EDO; DNQ	GDC; DNQ	GDG; DNQ	GDO; 3R	ADO; 2R	EDG; DNQ	DDM; DNQ	DDO; DNQ	CDO; 2R	ADC; DNQ	EDM; 2R	IDO; 2R	GDT; DNQ
2020	BDC; DNQ	GDC; DNQ	EDG; 1R	IDO; DNQ									
2021	HDT; DNQ	GDT; 1R											
2022	IDO; DNQ	GDC; DNQ	GDG; DNQ	ADO; DNQ	EDO; DNP	CDO; 1R	EDG; DNQ	DDC; DNQ	EDM; DNQ	HDT; DNQ	GDO; 1R	BDO; DNQ	GDT; 1R
2023	BSD; DNQ	EDO; 1R	IDO; DNQ	GDG; DNQ	ADO; 2R	DDC; DNP	BDO; DNP	CDO; DNP	EDG; DNP	EDM; DNP	GDO; DNP	HDT; DNP	GDC; DNP

PDC Players Championships

Season	1	2	3	4	5	6	7	8	9	10	11	12	13	14	15	16	17	18	19	20	21	22	23	24	25	26	27	28	29	30	31	32	33	34
2008 (Note: Tour card system non-existent)	Did not participate																KIT; 1R	DNP																
2011	HAL; SF	HAL; QF	DER; 4R	DER; 2R	CRA; 4R	CRA; 2R	VIE; 2R	VIE; 3R	CRA; 2R	CRA; QF	BAR; 2R	BAR; 1R	NUL; 4R	NUL; 1R	ONT; 4R	ONT; 3R	DER; 3R	DER; 4R	NUL; 3R	NUL; 2R	DUB; 2R	DUB; 2R	KIL; 4R	GLA; QF	GLA; 2R	ALI; 2R	ALI; 3R	CRA; DNP	CRA; DNP	WIG; 1R	WIG; 1R			
2012	ALI; 3R	ALI; 2R	REA; 1R	REA; 1R	CRA; 3R	CRA; 1R	BIR; 1R	BIR; 4R	CRA; 2R	CRA; 1R	BAR; 1R	BAR; 1R	DUB; 3R	DUB; 1R	KIL; 3R	KIL; QF	CRA; 2R	CRA; 4R	BAR; 1R	BAR; 1R														
2013	WIG; 1R	WIG; 1R	WIG; 1R	WIG; 1R	CRA; 2R	CRA; 1R	BAR; 4R	BAR; 4R	DUB; 1R	DUB; 2R	KIL; QF	KIL; 2R	WIG; 2R	WIG; 4R	BAR; 2R	BAR; 4R																		
2014	BAR; 2R	BAR; 2R	CRA; 3R	CRA; 2R	WIG; 2R	WIG; 1R	WIG; 1R	WIG; 2R	CRA; 1R	CRA; 1R	COV; 4R	COV; 1R	CRA; 2R	CRA; 3R	DUB; 1R	DUB; 1R	CRA; 1R	CRA; 2R	COV; 4R	COV; 2R														
2015	BAR; 1R	BAR; 2R	BAR; 1R	BAR; 3R	BAR; 3R	COV; 1R	COV; 2R	COV; SF	CRA; 3R	CRA; 1R	BAR; 2R	BAR; 1R	WIG; 1R	WIG; 3R	BAR; 2R	BAR; 2R	DUB; 2R	DUB; 1R	COV; 1R	COV; 2R														
2016	BAR; 1R	BAR; 1R	BAR; 1R	BAR; 1R	BAR; 3R	BAR; 2R	BAR; 2R	COV; 2R	COV; 1R	BAR; 3R	BAR; 1R	BAR; 4R	BAR; 3R	BAR; SF	BAR; 1R	BAR; 1R	DUB; 4R	DUB; 1R	BAR; 2R	BAR; 3R														
2017	BAR; 1R	BAR; 3R	BAR; 3R	BAR; 3R	MIL; 3R	MIL; 1R	BAR; 1R	BAR; 3R	WIG; 1R	WIG; 2R	MIL; 3R	MIL; 2R	WIG; 3R	WIG; 2R	BAR; QF	BAR; 2R	BAR; 3R	BAR; 2R	DUB; 4R	DUB; QF	BAR; 4R	BAR; QF												
2018	BAR; 4R	BAR; 2R	BAR; 4R	BAR; 3R	MIL; 2R	MIL; QF	BAR; QF	BAR; 1R	WIG; 1R	WIG; 1R	MIL; 3R	MIL; 4R	WIG; 4R	WIG; 3R	BAR; 4R	BAR; 2R	BAR; 2R	BAR; QF	DUB; 4R	DUB; 2R	BAR; 4R	BAR; 1R												
2019	WIG; 2R	WIG; QF	WIG; QF	WIG; 2R	BAR; QF	BAR; QF	WIG; 1R	WIG; 3R	BAR; 3R	BAR; 4R	BAR; 1R	BAR; SF	BAR; 1R	BAR; 2R	BAR; 3R	BAR; 4R	WIG; 2R	WIG; 3R	BAR; 2R	BAR; 3R	HIL; 1R	HIL; 1R	BAR; 4R	BAR; QF	BAR; 1R	BAR; 3R	DUB; 1R	DUB; 3R	BAR; 3R	BAR; 2R				
2020	BAR; 3R	BAR; 2R	WIG; 1R	WIG; 2R	WIG; 2R	WIG; 2R	BAR; 3R	BAR; 3R	MIL; 1R	MIL; 1R	MIL; 1R	MIL; 2R	MIL; QF	NIE; 1R	NIE; 2R	NIE; 1R	NIE; 1R	NIE; 2R	COV; 2R	COV; 1R	COV; 1R	COV; 1R	COV; 1R											
2021	BOL; 1R	BOL; 2R	BOL; 2R	BOL; 1R	MIL; 1R	MIL; 2R	MIL; 1R	MIL; 2R	NIE; 1R	NIE; 2R	NIE; 1R	NIE; 1R	MIL; 4R	MIL; 1R	MIL; 1R	MIL; 1R	COV; 2R	COV; 3R	COV; 1R	COV; 2R	BAR; 4R	BAR; 1R	BAR; 1R	BAR; 1R	BAR; 2R	BAR; 2R	BAR; 1R	BAR; 1R	BAR; 1R	BAR; 1R				
2022	BAR; 1R	BAR; 1R	WIG; 1R	WIG; 1R	BAR; 1R	BAR; 1R	NIE; 1R	NIE; 1R	BAR; 1R	BAR; 1R	BAR; 2R	BAR; 2R	BAR; 4R	WIG; 2R	WIG; 1R	NIE; QF	NIE; 4R	BAR; 2R	BAR; 3R	BAR; 3R	BAR; 1R	BAR; 2R	BAR; 1R	BAR; 1R	BAR; 1R	BAR; 2R	BAR; 2R	BAR; 1R	BAR; 2R	BAR; 1R				
2023 (Note: Not a Tour card holder)	DNP								WIG; 1R	WIG; 1R	LEI; 1R	LEI; 1R	HIL; DNP	HIL; DNP	LEI; 1R	LEI; 3R	HIL; DNP	HIL; DNP	BAR; 1R	BAR; 1R	BAR; 2R	BAR; 2R	BAR; 2R	BAR; 1R	DNP									
2024	DNP				HIL; 3R	HIL; 2R	DNP								MIL; 1R	MIL; 1R	MIL; 3R	MIL; 1R	MIL; 2R	WIG; 1R	WIG; 1R	LEI; DNP	LEI; DNP	WIG; 1R	WIG; 2R	DNP			LEI; 1R	LEI; 2R				

Performance Table Legend
W	Won the tournament	F	Finalist	SF	Semifinalist	QF	Quarterfinalist	#R; RR; Prel.	Lost in # round Round-robin; Preliminary round	DQ	Disqualified
DNQ	Did not qualify	DNP	Did not participate	WD	Withdrew	NH	Tournament not held	#R; RR; Prel.	Lost in # round Round-robin; Preliminary round	NYF	Not yet founded
