= 2022 World Seniors Darts Matchplay =

2022 JENNINGSbet World Seniors Darts Matchplay

Tournament information
- Dates: 1–3 July 2022
- Venue: Bonus Arena
- Location: Kingston upon Hull
- Country: England
- Organisation(s): WSDT
- Format: Legs; Final – best of 17 legs
- Prize fund: £31,000
- Winner's share: £10,000
- High checkout: 170 Terry Jenkins

Champion(s)
- Robert Thornton

The 2022 World Seniors Darts Matchplay (known for sponsorship reasons as the 2022 JENNINGSbet World Seniors Darts Matchplay) was the first World Seniors Darts Matchplay organised by the World Seniors Darts Tour and was held at the Bonus Arena in Kingston upon Hull between 1–3 July 2022.

Robert Thornton won his second WSDT title, by defeating Phil Taylor 12–10 in the final, after Taylor missed two match darts to win the title. He had a dart whilst leading 8–6 at double 16, and also missed a dart at double 18 when leading 8–7. Thornton then brought the final to extra legs, which he eventually got two clear in to win 12–10.

== Format ==
As with the World Matchplay tournaments organised by the Professional Darts Corporation, the Matchplay used the leg format, and the winner needing to be two legs clear at the winning post, with a game being extended if necessary for a maximum of six extra legs before a tie-break leg is required. For example, in a first to 8 legs first round match, if the score reaches 10–10 then the 21st leg will be the decider.

The preliminary and first rounds, as well as the quarter-finals will be the best of 15 legs (or first to 8 legs), and the semi-finals and final will be the best of 17 legs (or first to 9).

== Prize money ==
The prize fund of £31,000 was announced in January, but that was before the tournament expanded to 20 players.

Position (no. of players)		Prize money (Total: £31,000)
Winner	(1)	£10,000
Runner-up	(1)	£5,000
Semi-finalists	(2)	£2,500
Quarter-finalists	(4)	£1,250
First round	(8)	£750
Preliminary round	(4)	£500

== Qualifiers ==
On 7 January 2022, Phil Taylor and Martin Adams were announced as the first players in this 16-player, 2-day tournament.

On 23 February, the number of participants was upped to 20, and the event was extended to 3 days.

Invited players
Starting in First round

- (England) Martin Adams (semi-finals)
- (England) Bob Anderson (first round)
- (England) Ronnie Baxter (first round)
- (United States) Larry Butler (first round)
- (England) Peter Evison (first round)
- (England) Terry Jenkins (quarter-finals)
- (England) John Lowe (first round)
- (England) Peter Manley (quarter-finals)
- (England) Kevin Painter (semi-finals)
- (Canada) John Part (first round)
- (England) Phil Taylor (runner-up)
- (Scotland) Robert Thornton (champion)

Starting in Preliminary round

- (England) Lisa Ashton (quarter-finals)
- (England) Keith Deller (preliminary round)
- (England) Trina Gulliver (preliminary round)
- (England) Deta Hedman (first round)
- (England) Tony O'Shea (preliminary round)

Qualifiers
Starting in preliminary round

- (England) Brian Dawson (first round)
- (England) Paul Hogan (preliminary round)

Highest non-qualifier on WSDT Order of Merit
Starting in preliminary round

- (Republic of Ireland) Colin McGarry (quarter-finals)

== Draw ==
The draw for the tournament was announced on 12 April 2022.

Preliminary round (best of 15 legs); 1–2 July
Deta Hedman 71.51	8
Trina Gulliver 70.04	5
Keith Deller 80.65	3
RQ	Colin McGarry 89.73	8
Lisa Ashton 83.77	8
Q	Paul Hogan 86.80	5
Tony O'Shea 83.18	7
Q	Brian Dawson 84.35	9

First round (best of 15 legs); 1–2 July
Phil Taylor 75.77	8
Deta Hedman 71.24	4
John Part 71.52	10
Peter Manley 72.23	11
John Lowe 71.30	0
Kevin Painter 85.28	8
Peter Evison 53.90	0
RQ	Colin McGarry 95.43	8
Larry Butler 78.16	4
Lisa Ashton 80.44	8
Bob Anderson 74.93	2
Martin Adams 86.55	8
Terry Jenkins 81.57	8
Ronnie Baxter 75.37	5
Robert Thornton 87.10	8
Q	Brian Dawson 78.75	5

Quarter-finals (best of 15 legs); 3 July
Phil Taylor 80.51	8
Peter Manley 68.85	4
Kevin Painter 92.18	8
RQ	Colin McGarry 90.33	5
Lisa Ashton 76.84	0
Martin Adams 84.68	8
Terry Jenkins 84.46	6
Robert Thornton 87.79	8

Semi-finals (best of 17 legs); 3 July
Phil Taylor 88.44	12
Kevin Painter 80.35	10
Martin Adams 92.29	7
Robert Thornton 92.90	9

Final (best of 17 legs); 3 July
Phil Taylor 85.83	10
Robert Thornton 88.30	12
