= 2022 Grand Slam of Darts =

2022 Cazoo Grand Slam of Darts

Tournament information
- Dates: 12–20 November 2022
- Venue: Aldersley Leisure Village
- Location: Aldersley, Wolverhampton
- Country: England
- Organisation(s): PDC
- Format: Legs
- Prize fund: £650,000
- Winner's share: £150,000
- Nine-dart finish: Josh Rock
- High checkout: 170 Luke Woodhouse; Joe Cullen

Champion(s)
- Michael Smith

The 2022 Cazoo Grand Slam of Darts, was the sixteenth staging of the Grand Slam of Darts, organised by the Professional Darts Corporation. The event took place at the Aldersley Leisure Village, Wolverhampton, 12–20 November 2022.

Gerwyn Price was the defending champion, after defeating Peter Wright 16–8 in the 2021 final, but he was eliminated by Raymond van Barneveld, losing 16–13 in their quarter-final.

Michael Smith won his first major title, defeating Nathan Aspinall 16–5 in the final. It was the first time the tournament had been won by an Englishman since 2014, when it was won by Phil Taylor.

Josh Rock, who made his debut, hit a nine-dart finish during his second-round defeat to Michael van Gerwen.

== Prize money ==
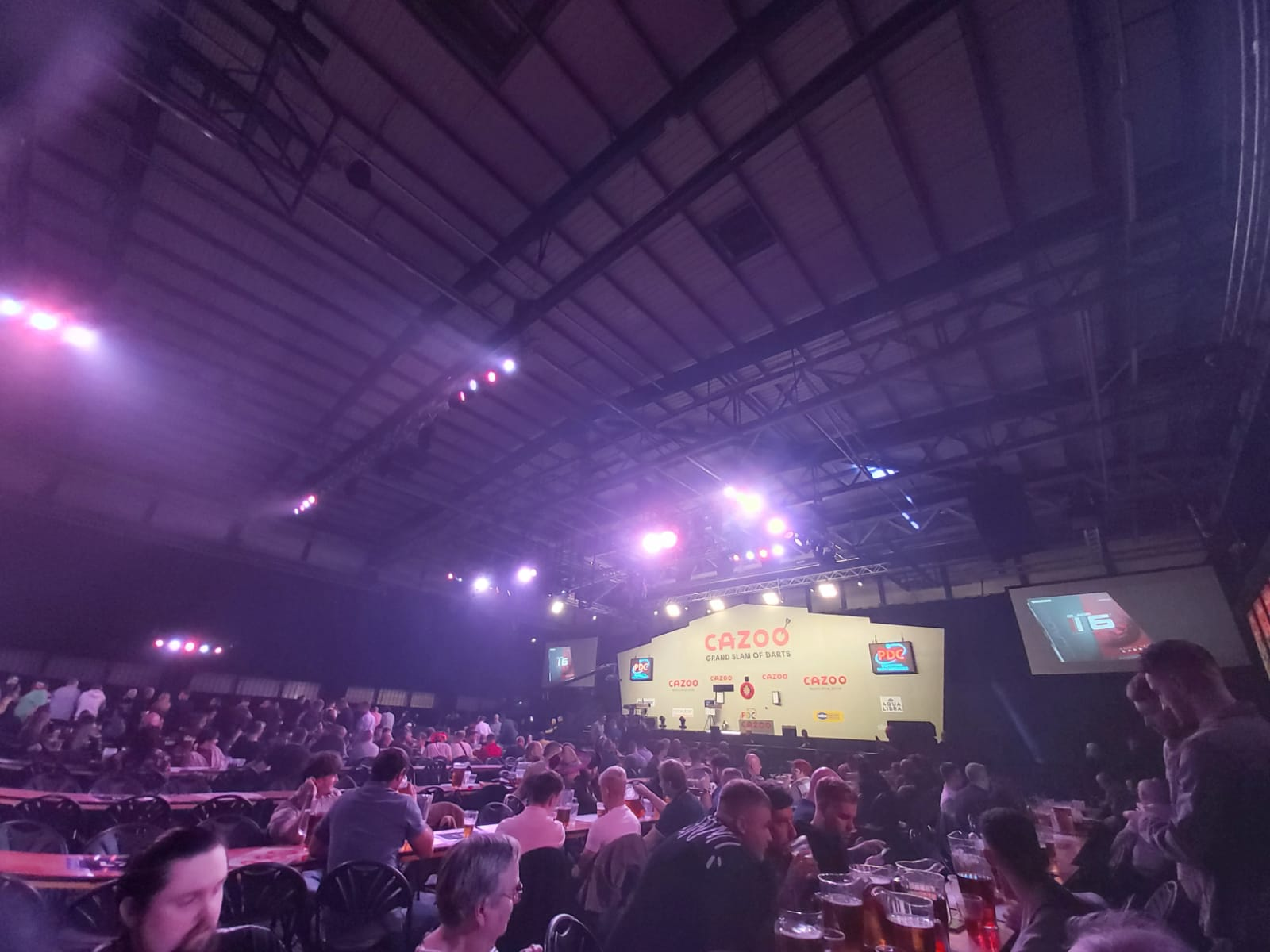
The quarter finals of the Grand Slam of Darts 2022 at Aldersley Leisure Village, Wolverhampton

The prize fund for the Grand Slam increased by £100,000 to £650,000.

Position (num. of players)		Prize money (Total: £650,000)
Winner	(1)	£150,000
Runner-up	(1)	£70,000
Semi-finalists	(2)	£50,000
Quarter-finalists	(4)	£25,000
Last 16	(8)	£12,250
Third in group	(8)	£8,000
Fourth in group	(8)	£5,000
Group winner bonus	(8)	£3,500

== Qualification ==
The qualification criteria were slightly altered again for the 2022 tournament, with no representation from the World Darts Federation.

The qualifiers are:

=== PDC Qualifying Tournaments ===
PDC Main Tournaments
Tournament	Year	Position	Player	Qualifiers
PDC World Darts Championship	2022	Winner	Peter Wright	Peter Wright; Gerwyn Price; Michael van Gerwen; Joe Cullen; Danny Noppert; Ross Smith; Damon Heta; Simon Whitlock; Michael Smith; Nathan Aspinall; Dave Chisnall; Ryan Searle; Dirk van Duijvenbode; Jonny Clayton
Grand Slam of Darts	2021	Winner	Gerwyn Price	Peter Wright; Gerwyn Price; Michael van Gerwen; Joe Cullen; Danny Noppert; Ross Smith; Damon Heta; Simon Whitlock; Michael Smith; Nathan Aspinall; Dave Chisnall; Ryan Searle; Dirk van Duijvenbode; Jonny Clayton
Premier League Darts	2022	Winner	Michael van Gerwen	Peter Wright; Gerwyn Price; Michael van Gerwen; Joe Cullen; Danny Noppert; Ross Smith; Damon Heta; Simon Whitlock; Michael Smith; Nathan Aspinall; Dave Chisnall; Ryan Searle; Dirk van Duijvenbode; Jonny Clayton
World Matchplay	2022	Winner	Michael van Gerwen	Peter Wright; Gerwyn Price; Michael van Gerwen; Joe Cullen; Danny Noppert; Ross Smith; Damon Heta; Simon Whitlock; Michael Smith; Nathan Aspinall; Dave Chisnall; Ryan Searle; Dirk van Duijvenbode; Jonny Clayton
World Grand Prix	2022	Winner	Michael van Gerwen	Peter Wright; Gerwyn Price; Michael van Gerwen; Joe Cullen; Danny Noppert; Ross Smith; Damon Heta; Simon Whitlock; Michael Smith; Nathan Aspinall; Dave Chisnall; Ryan Searle; Dirk van Duijvenbode; Jonny Clayton
Masters	2022	Winner	Joe Cullen	Peter Wright; Gerwyn Price; Michael van Gerwen; Joe Cullen; Danny Noppert; Ross Smith; Damon Heta; Simon Whitlock; Michael Smith; Nathan Aspinall; Dave Chisnall; Ryan Searle; Dirk van Duijvenbode; Jonny Clayton
UK Open	2022	Winner	Danny Noppert	Peter Wright; Gerwyn Price; Michael van Gerwen; Joe Cullen; Danny Noppert; Ross Smith; Damon Heta; Simon Whitlock; Michael Smith; Nathan Aspinall; Dave Chisnall; Ryan Searle; Dirk van Duijvenbode; Jonny Clayton
European Championship	2022	Winner	Ross Smith	Peter Wright; Gerwyn Price; Michael van Gerwen; Joe Cullen; Danny Noppert; Ross Smith; Damon Heta; Simon Whitlock; Michael Smith; Nathan Aspinall; Dave Chisnall; Ryan Searle; Dirk van Duijvenbode; Jonny Clayton
Players Championship Finals	2021	Winner	Peter Wright	Peter Wright; Gerwyn Price; Michael van Gerwen; Joe Cullen; Danny Noppert; Ross Smith; Damon Heta; Simon Whitlock; Michael Smith; Nathan Aspinall; Dave Chisnall; Ryan Searle; Dirk van Duijvenbode; Jonny Clayton
World Series of Darts Finals	2022	Winner	Gerwyn Price	Peter Wright; Gerwyn Price; Michael van Gerwen; Joe Cullen; Danny Noppert; Ross Smith; Damon Heta; Simon Whitlock; Michael Smith; Nathan Aspinall; Dave Chisnall; Ryan Searle; Dirk van Duijvenbode; Jonny Clayton
PDC World Cup of Darts	2022	Winners	Damon Heta; Simon Whitlock	Peter Wright; Gerwyn Price; Michael van Gerwen; Joe Cullen; Danny Noppert; Ross Smith; Damon Heta; Simon Whitlock; Michael Smith; Nathan Aspinall; Dave Chisnall; Ryan Searle; Dirk van Duijvenbode; Jonny Clayton
PDC World Darts Championship	2022	Runner-up	Michael Smith	Peter Wright; Gerwyn Price; Michael van Gerwen; Joe Cullen; Danny Noppert; Ross Smith; Damon Heta; Simon Whitlock; Michael Smith; Nathan Aspinall; Dave Chisnall; Ryan Searle; Dirk van Duijvenbode; Jonny Clayton
Grand Slam of Darts	2021	Runner-up	Peter Wright	Peter Wright; Gerwyn Price; Michael van Gerwen; Joe Cullen; Danny Noppert; Ross Smith; Damon Heta; Simon Whitlock; Michael Smith; Nathan Aspinall; Dave Chisnall; Ryan Searle; Dirk van Duijvenbode; Jonny Clayton
Premier League Darts	2022	Runner-up	Joe Cullen	Peter Wright; Gerwyn Price; Michael van Gerwen; Joe Cullen; Danny Noppert; Ross Smith; Damon Heta; Simon Whitlock; Michael Smith; Nathan Aspinall; Dave Chisnall; Ryan Searle; Dirk van Duijvenbode; Jonny Clayton
World Matchplay	2022	Runner-up	Gerwyn Price	Peter Wright; Gerwyn Price; Michael van Gerwen; Joe Cullen; Danny Noppert; Ross Smith; Damon Heta; Simon Whitlock; Michael Smith; Nathan Aspinall; Dave Chisnall; Ryan Searle; Dirk van Duijvenbode; Jonny Clayton
World Grand Prix	2022	Runner-up	Nathan Aspinall	Peter Wright; Gerwyn Price; Michael van Gerwen; Joe Cullen; Danny Noppert; Ross Smith; Damon Heta; Simon Whitlock; Michael Smith; Nathan Aspinall; Dave Chisnall; Ryan Searle; Dirk van Duijvenbode; Jonny Clayton
Masters	2022	Runner-up	Dave Chisnall	Peter Wright; Gerwyn Price; Michael van Gerwen; Joe Cullen; Danny Noppert; Ross Smith; Damon Heta; Simon Whitlock; Michael Smith; Nathan Aspinall; Dave Chisnall; Ryan Searle; Dirk van Duijvenbode; Jonny Clayton
UK Open	2022	Runner-up	Michael Smith	Peter Wright; Gerwyn Price; Michael van Gerwen; Joe Cullen; Danny Noppert; Ross Smith; Damon Heta; Simon Whitlock; Michael Smith; Nathan Aspinall; Dave Chisnall; Ryan Searle; Dirk van Duijvenbode; Jonny Clayton
European Championship	2022	Runner-up	Michael Smith	Peter Wright; Gerwyn Price; Michael van Gerwen; Joe Cullen; Danny Noppert; Ross Smith; Damon Heta; Simon Whitlock; Michael Smith; Nathan Aspinall; Dave Chisnall; Ryan Searle; Dirk van Duijvenbode; Jonny Clayton
Players Championship Finals	2021	Runner-up	Ryan Searle	Peter Wright; Gerwyn Price; Michael van Gerwen; Joe Cullen; Danny Noppert; Ross Smith; Damon Heta; Simon Whitlock; Michael Smith; Nathan Aspinall; Dave Chisnall; Ryan Searle; Dirk van Duijvenbode; Jonny Clayton
World Series of Darts Finals	2022	Runner-up	Dirk van Duijvenbode	Peter Wright; Gerwyn Price; Michael van Gerwen; Joe Cullen; Danny Noppert; Ross Smith; Damon Heta; Simon Whitlock; Michael Smith; Nathan Aspinall; Dave Chisnall; Ryan Searle; Dirk van Duijvenbode; Jonny Clayton
PDC World Cup of Darts	2022	Runners-Up	Gerwyn Price; Jonny Clayton	Peter Wright; Gerwyn Price; Michael van Gerwen; Joe Cullen; Danny Noppert; Ross Smith; Damon Heta; Simon Whitlock; Michael Smith; Nathan Aspinall; Dave Chisnall; Ryan Searle; Dirk van Duijvenbode; Jonny Clayton
Note: Players in italics had already qualified for the tournament.				Peter Wright; Gerwyn Price; Michael van Gerwen; Joe Cullen; Danny Noppert; Ross Smith; Damon Heta; Simon Whitlock; Michael Smith; Nathan Aspinall; Dave Chisnall; Ryan Searle; Dirk van Duijvenbode; Jonny Clayton

If the list of qualifiers from the main tournaments produced fewer than the required number of players (16), the field will be filled from the reserve lists. The first list consisted of the winners from 2022 European Tour events, in which the winners were ordered firstly by number of wins, then by Order of Merit position order at the cut-off date.

PDC European Tour
Tournament	Event	Position	Player	Qualifiers
2022 European Tour
2022 European Tour	International Darts Open	Winner	Gerwyn Price	Luke Humphries
2022 European Tour	German Darts Championship	Winner	Michael van Gerwen	Luke Humphries
2022 European Tour	German Darts Grand Prix	Winner	Luke Humphries	Luke Humphries
2022 European Tour	Austrian Darts Open	Winner	Michael van Gerwen	Luke Humphries
2022 European Tour	European Darts Open	Winner	Michael van Gerwen	Luke Humphries
2022 European Tour	Czech Darts Open	Winner	Luke Humphries	Luke Humphries
2022 European Tour	European Darts Grand Prix	Winner	Luke Humphries	Luke Humphries
2022 European Tour	Dutch Darts Championship	Winner	Michael Smith	Luke Humphries
2022 European Tour	European Darts Matchplay	Winner	Luke Humphries	Luke Humphries
2022 European Tour	Hungarian Darts Trophy	Winner	Joe Cullen	Luke Humphries
2022 European Tour	German Darts Open	Winner	Peter Wright	Luke Humphries
2022 European Tour	Belgian Darts Open	Winner	Dave Chisnall	Luke Humphries
2022 European Tour	Gibraltar Darts Trophy	Winner	Damon Heta	Luke Humphries
Note: Players in italics had already qualified for the tournament.				Luke Humphries

If there are still not enough qualifiers after European Tour events are added, the winners of 2022 Players Championship events will be added, firstly in order by number of wins, then in Order of Merit order.

PDC Pro Tour
Tournament	Event	Position	Player	Qualifiers
2022 PDC Pro Tour
2022 PDC Pro Tour	Players Championship 1	Winner	Luke Humphries	Rob Cross
2022 PDC Pro Tour	Players Championship 2	Winner	Peter Wright	Rob Cross
2022 PDC Pro Tour	Players Championship 3	Winner	Joe Cullen	Rob Cross
2022 PDC Pro Tour	Players Championship 4	Winner	Joe Cullen (2)	Rob Cross
2022 PDC Pro Tour	Players Championship 5	Winner	Damon Heta	Rob Cross
2022 PDC Pro Tour	Players Championship 6	Winner	Jim Williams	Rob Cross
2022 PDC Pro Tour	Players Championship 7	Winner	Gerwyn Price	Rob Cross
2022 PDC Pro Tour	Players Championship 8	Winner	Michael van Gerwen	Rob Cross
2022 PDC Pro Tour	Players Championship 9	Winner	Danny Jansen	Rob Cross
2022 PDC Pro Tour	Players Championship 10	Winner	Michael van Gerwen (2)	Rob Cross
2022 PDC Pro Tour	Players Championship 11	Winner	Ryan Searle	Rob Cross
2022 PDC Pro Tour	Players Championship 12	Winner	Dirk van Duijvenbode	Rob Cross
2022 PDC Pro Tour	Players Championship 13	Winner	Nathan Aspinall	Rob Cross
2022 PDC Pro Tour	Players Championship 14	Winner	Michael Smith	Rob Cross
2022 PDC Pro Tour	Players Championship 15	Winner	Michael Smith (2)	Rob Cross
2022 PDC Pro Tour	Players Championship 16	Winner	Michael Smith (3)	Rob Cross
2022 PDC Pro Tour	Players Championship 17	Winner	Scott Williams	Rob Cross
2022 PDC Pro Tour	Players Championship 18	Winner	Dirk van Duijvenbode (2)	Rob Cross
2022 PDC Pro Tour	Players Championship 19	Winner	Danny Noppert	Rob Cross
2022 PDC Pro Tour	Players Championship 20	Winner	Adrian Lewis	Rob Cross
2022 PDC Pro Tour	Players Championship 21	Winner	Brendan Dolan	Rob Cross
2022 PDC Pro Tour	Players Championship 22	Winner	Nathan Aspinall (2)	Rob Cross
2022 PDC Pro Tour	Players Championship 23	Winner	Keegan Brown	Rob Cross
2022 PDC Pro Tour	Players Championship 24	Winner	Rob Cross	Rob Cross
2022 PDC Pro Tour	Players Championship 25	Winner	Dave Chisnall	Rob Cross
2022 PDC Pro Tour	Players Championship 26	Winner	Damon Heta (2)	Rob Cross
2022 PDC Pro Tour	Players Championship 27	Winner	Rob Cross (2)	Rob Cross
2022 PDC Pro Tour	Players Championship 28	Winner	Josh Rock	Rob Cross
2022 PDC Pro Tour	Players Championship 29	Winner	Gerwyn Price (2)	Rob Cross
2022 PDC Pro Tour	Players Championship 30	Winner	James Wade	Rob Cross
Note: Players in italics had already qualified for the tournament.				Rob Cross

=== PDC Qualifying Event ===
A further eight places in the Grand Slam of Darts were filled by qualifiers from a PDC Tour Card Holder qualifier held on 6 November in Barnsley.

These are the qualifiers:

- Ritchie Edhouse
- Raymond van Barneveld
- Adam Gawlas
- Alan Soutar
- Martin Schindler
- Luke Woodhouse
- Mensur Suljović
- Jermaine Wattimena

=== Additional Qualifiers ===
The winners of these tournaments and tours also qualified for the tournament.

Tournament	Year	Position	Player
PDC World Youth Championship	2021	Winner	Ted Evetts
PDC World Youth Championship	2021	Runner-up	Nathan Rafferty
PDC Challenge Tour	2022	Order of Merit Winner	Scott Williams
PDC Development Tour	2022	Order of Merit Winner	Josh Rock (Note: Rock qualified as 2nd of the Development Tour Order of Merit after Nathan Rafferty was already qualified.)
Women's World Matchplay	2022	Winner	Fallon Sherrock
PDC Women's Series	2022	Order of Merit Winner	Lisa Ashton
PDC Asian Championship	2022	Winner	Christian Perez
PDC North American Championship	2022	Winner	Leonard Gates

== Draw ==
The draw was done by PDC executive Matt Porter on 7 November.

=== Pools ===
Pool A	Pool B	Pool C	Pool D
(Seeded Players)	(Qualifiers)		
Gerwyn Price (1); Peter Wright (2); Michael van Gerwen (3); Michael Smith (4); Rob Cross (5); Luke Humphries (6); Jonny Clayton (7); Danny Noppert (8)	Nathan Aspinall; Dave Chisnall; Joe Cullen; Dirk van Duijvenbode; Ryan Searle; Damon Heta; Ross Smith; Simon Whitlock	Mensur Suljović; Martin Schindler; Jermaine Wattimena; Alan Soutar; Luke Woodhouse; Raymond van Barneveld; Josh Rock; Ritchie Edhouse	Adam Gawlas; Scott Williams; Nathan Rafferty; Ted Evetts; Lisa Ashton; Leonard Gates; Christian Perez; Fallon Sherrock

=== Group stage ===
All group matches are best of nine legs
After three games, the top two in each group qualify for the knock-out stage

NB: P = Played; W = Won; L = Lost; LF = Legs for; LA = Legs against; +/− = Plus/minus record, in relation to legs; Pts = Points; Status = Qualified to knockout stage

==== Group A ====
Pos.	Player	P	W	L	LF	LA	+/−	Pts	Status
1	Raymond van Barneveld (Q)	3	3	0	15	7	+8	6	Q
2	Gerwyn Price (1)	3	2	1	14	10	+4	4	Q
3	Dave Chisnall	3	1	2	12	12	0	2	Eliminated
4	Ted Evetts	3	0	3	3	15	–12	0	Eliminated

12 November

Dave Chisnall 90.40	3–5	Raymond van Barneveld 90.71
Gerwyn Price 101.39	5–1	Ted Evetts 94.66

13 November

Dave Chisnall 101.50	5–2	Ted Evetts 87.21
Gerwyn Price 105.99	4–5	Raymond van Barneveld 100.08

14 November

Raymond van Barneveld 97.60	5–0	Ted Evetts 78.80
Gerwyn Price 103.16	5–4	Dave Chisnall 101.44

==== Group B ====
Pos.	Player	P	W	L	LF	LA	+/−	Pts	Status
1	Danny Noppert (8)	3	3	0	15	10	+5	6	Q
2	Simon Whitlock	3	2	1	12	10	+2	4	Q
3	Mensur Suljović (Q)	3	1	2	11	12	–1	2	Eliminated
4	Christian Perez	3	0	3	9	15	–6	0	Eliminated

12 November

Simon Whitlock 97.21	5–2	Mensur Suljović 91.24
Danny Noppert 95.61	5–4	Christian Perez 85.43

13 November

Mensur Suljović 83.98	5–2	Christian Perez 82.21
Danny Noppert 99.98	5–2	Simon Whitlock 99.09

14 November

Simon Whitlock 99.24	5–3	Christian Perez 91.12
Danny Noppert 88.70	5–4	Mensur Suljović 86.16

==== Group C ====
Pos.	Player	P	W	L	LF	LA	+/−	Pts	Status
1	Michael Smith (4)	3	3	0	15	5	+10	6	Q
2	Joe Cullen	3	2	1	11	9	+2	4	Q
3	Ritchie Edhouse (Q)	3	1	2	7	12	–5	2	Eliminated
4	Lisa Ashton	3	0	3	8	15	–7	0	Eliminated

12 November

Joe Cullen 93.51	5–1	Ritchie Edhouse 86.67
Michael Smith 91.21	5–3	Lisa Ashton 77.28

13 November

Ritchie Edhouse 85.98	5–2	Lisa Ashton 82.25
Michael Smith 95.19	5–1	Joe Cullen 90.70

14 November

Joe Cullen 97.18	5–3	Lisa Ashton 89.88
Michael Smith 102.20	5–1	Ritchie Edhouse 89.88

==== Group D ====
Pos.	Player	P	W	L	LF	LA	+/−	Pts	Status
1	Dirk van Duijvenbode	3	3	0	15	10	+5	6	Q
2	Rob Cross (5)	3	2	1	13	11	+2	4	Q
3	Martin Schindler (Q)	3	1	2	13	13	0	2	Eliminated
4	Adam Gawlas (Q)	3	0	3	8	15	–7	0	Eliminated

12 November

Dirk van Duijvenbode 102.89	5–4	Martin Schindler 98.31
Rob Cross 100.87	5–2	Adam Gawlas 81.75

13 November

Martin Schindler 90.28	5–3	Adam Gawlas 90.17
Rob Cross 88.80	3–5	Dirk van Duijvenbode 95.33

14 November

Dirk van Duijvenbode 98.07	5–3	Adam Gawlas 97.57
Rob Cross 91.90	5–4	Martin Schindler 90.35

==== Group E ====
Pos.	Player	P	W	L	LF	LA	+/−	Pts	Status
1	Nathan Aspinall	3	2	1	14	8	+6	4	Q
2	Alan Soutar (Q)	3	2	1	14	11	+3	4	Q
3	Peter Wright (2)	3	2	1	12	10	+2	4	Eliminated
4	Fallon Sherrock	3	0	3	4	15	–11	0	Eliminated

12 November

Nathan Aspinall 92.41	4–5	Alan Soutar 91.09
Peter Wright 87.59	5–1	Fallon Sherrock 84.35

13 November

Nathan Aspinall 93.92	5–1	Fallon Sherrock 88.15
Peter Wright 89.60	5–4	Alan Soutar 95.47

15 November

Alan Soutar 89.79	5–2	Fallon Sherrock 84.24
Peter Wright 90.54	2–5	Nathan Aspinall 92.89

==== Group F ====
Pos.	Player	P	W	L	LF	LA	+/−	Pts	Status
1	Jonny Clayton (7)	3	2	1	12	5	+7	4	Q
2	Jermaine Wattimena (Q)	3	2	1	10	8	+2	4	Q
3	Damon Heta	3	2	1	12	11	+1	4	Eliminated
4	Leonard Gates	3	0	3	5	15	–10	0	Eliminated

12 November

Damon Heta 93.03	2–5	Jermaine Wattimena 97.51
Jonny Clayton 92.78	5–0	Leonard Gates 85.37

13 November

Damon Heta 95.98	5–4	Leonard Gates 90.94
Jonny Clayton 89.46	5–0	Jermaine Wattimena 85.19

15 November

Jermaine Wattimena 88.35	5–1	Leonard Gates 79.07
Jonny Clayton 85.61	2–5	Damon Heta 93.25

==== Group G ====
Pos.	Player	P	W	L	LF	LA	+/−	Pts	Status
1	Michael van Gerwen (3)	3	2	1	14	8	+6	4	Q
2	Ross Smith	3	2	1	14	11	+3	4	Q
3	Luke Woodhouse (Q)	3	1	2	10	14	–4	2	Eliminated
4	Nathan Rafferty	3	1	2	9	14	–5	2	Eliminated

12 November

Ross Smith 92.24	4–5	Luke Woodhouse 96.90
Michael van Gerwen 101.58	5–2	Nathan Rafferty 87.97

13 November

Ross Smith 94.51	5–2	Nathan Rafferty 86.51
Michael van Gerwen 99.75	5–1	Luke Woodhouse 90.41

15 November

Luke Woodhouse 101.26	4–5	Nathan Rafferty 96.51
Michael van Gerwen 104.80	4–5	Ross Smith 107.92

==== Group H ====
Pos.	Player	P	W	L	LF	LA	+/−	Pts	Status
1	Luke Humphries (6)	3	2	1	13	8	+5	4	Q
2	Josh Rock	3	2	1	14	12	+2	4	Q
3	Scott Williams	3	1	2	11	13	–2	2	Eliminated
4	Ryan Searle	3	1	2	9	14	–5	2	Eliminated

12 November

Ryan Searle 88.05	5–4	Josh Rock 89.91
Luke Humphries 94.45	5–2	Scott Williams 88.82

13 November

Josh Rock 96.62	5–4	Scott Williams 93.91
Luke Humphries 107.04	5–1	Ryan Searle 103.59

15 November

Ryan Searle 101.92	3–5	Scott Williams 107.46
Luke Humphries 99.31	3–5	Josh Rock 99.26

=== Knockout stage ===
Second round (best of 19 legs); 16–17 November
A1	Raymond van Barneveld 97.40 (Q)	10
B2	Simon Whitlock 101.14	8
B1	Danny Noppert 98.04 (8)	8
A2	Gerwyn Price 100.10 (1)	10
C1	Michael Smith 96.01 (4)	10
D2	Rob Cross 97.02 (5)	8
D1	Dirk van Duijvenbode 93.47	4
C2	Joe Cullen 95.46	10
E1	Nathan Aspinall 97.49	10
F2	Jermaine Wattimena 94.55 (Q)	6
F1	Jonny Clayton 94.54 (7)	8
E2	Alan Soutar 97.42 (Q)	10
G1	Michael van Gerwen 107.71 (3)	10
H2	Josh Rock 103.93	8
H1	Luke Humphries 96.20 (6)	10
G2	Ross Smith 92.72	8

Quarter-finals (best of 31 legs); 18–19 November
A1	Raymond van Barneveld 99.64 (Q)	16
A2	Gerwyn Price 101.78 (1)	13
C1	Michael Smith 100.11 (4)	16
C2	Joe Cullen 98.13	15
E1	Nathan Aspinall 95.18	16
E2	Alan Soutar 95.12 (Q)	12
G1	Michael van Gerwen 95.99 (3)	10
H1	Luke Humphries 96.71 (6)	16

Semi-finals (best of 31 legs); 20 November
A1	Raymond van Barneveld 94.97 (Q)	12
C1	Michael Smith 104.10 (4)	16
E1	Nathan Aspinall 96.70	16
H1	Luke Humphries 94.38 (6)	12

Final (best of 31 legs); 20 November
C1	Michael Smith 96.84 (4)	16
E1	Nathan Aspinall 90.94	5

== Top averages ==
The table lists all players who achieved a three-dart average of at least 100 in a match. In the case one player has multiple records, this is indicated by the number in brackets.

#	Player	Round	Average	Result
1	Ross Smith	RR	107.92	Won
2	Michael van Gerwen	2R	107.71	Won
3	Scott Williams	RR	107.46	Won
4	Luke Humphries	RR	107.04	Won
5	Gerwyn Price	RR	105.99	Lost
6	Michael van Gerwen (2)	RR	104.80	Lost
7	Michael Smith	SF	104.10	Won
8	Josh Rock	2R	103.93	Lost
9	Ryan Searle	RR	103.59	Lost
10	Gerwyn Price (2)	RR	103.16	Won
11	Dirk van Duijvenbode	RR	102.89	Won
12	Michael Smith (2)	RR	102.20	Won
13	Ryan Searle (2)	RR	101.92	Lost
14	Gerwyn Price (3)	QF	101.78	Lost
15	Michael van Gerwen (3)	RR	101.58	Won
16	Dave Chisnall	RR	101.50	Won
17	Dave Chisnall (2)	RR	101.44	Lost
18	Gerwyn Price (4)	RR	101.39	Won
19	Luke Woodhouse	RR	101.26	Lost
20	Simon Whitlock	2R	101.14	Lost
21	Rob Cross	RR	100.87	Won
22	Michael Smith (3)	QF	100.11	Won
23	Gerwyn Price (5)	2R	100.10	Won
24	Raymond van Barneveld	RR	100.08	Won
