= 2022 World Seniors Darts Masters =

2022 JENNINGSbet World Seniors Darts Masters

Tournament information
- Dates: 27–29 May 2022
- Venue: Lakeside Country Club
- Location: Frimley Green
- Country: England
- Organisation(s): WSDT
- Format: Sets; Final – best of 11 Sets
- Prize fund: £31,000
- Winner's share: £10,000
- High checkout: 164 John Part (Preliminary round)

Champion(s)
- David Cameron

The 2022 World Seniors Darts Masters (known for sponsorship reasons as the 2022 JENNINGSbet World Seniors Darts Masters) was the first World Seniors Darts Masters organised by the World Seniors Darts Tour and was held at the Lakeside Country Club in Frimley Green between 27–29 May 2022.

The event was open to players over the age of 50, and was a joint venture between MODUS Sports and Jason Francis, which organised Snooker Legends and World Seniors Championship of Snooker in 2017–18.

David Cameron became the inaugural champion after defeating Phil Taylor 6–3 in the final. Cameron's victory was even more remarkable, as he had to win a qualifier to enter this event, and if he had won his first match at the 2022 WDF World Darts Championship (incidentally held at the same venue), he wouldn't have been able to take part in the qualifier.

== Format ==
As with the World Masters tournaments previously organised by the British Darts Organisation, the Masters used the set format, but with each set being a best of three legs (or first to two legs). The preliminary and first rounds, as well as the quarter-finals was the best of 7 sets, the semi-finals was the best of 9 sets, and the final was the best of 11 sets.

== Prize money ==
The prize fund of £31,000 was announced in January, but that was before the tournament expanded to 20 players.

Position (no. of players)		Prize money (Total: £31,000)
Winner	(1)	£10,000
Runner-up	(1)	£5,000
Semi-finalists	(2)	£2,500
Quarter-finalists	(4)	£1,250
First round	(8)	£750
Preliminary round	(4)	£0

== Qualifiers ==
On 11 January 2022, the first 6 players of the 16-player 2-day tournament were announced, which were Phil Taylor, Martin Adams, Bob Anderson, John Lowe, John Part and Les Wallace.

On 13 February, the numbers of entrants was increased to 20, and an extra day was added to tournament, with two players qualifying via qualifiers at Reading on 9–10 April, along with the highest non-qualified player on the World Series Tour Order of Merit, with the final player being decided by a fans vote on the WSDT's social media channels.

Invited players
Starting in First round

- (England) Martin Adams (quarter-finals)
- (England) Bob Anderson (first round)
- (England) Lisa Ashton (first round)
- (England) Keith Deller (quarter-finals)
- (England) Trina Gulliver (first round)
- (England) Deta Hedman (first round)
- (England) John Lowe (first round)
- (England) Colin Monk (quarter-finals)
- (England) Tony O'Shea (semi-finals)
- (England) Phil Taylor (runner-up)
- (Scotland) Robert Thornton (first round)
- (Scotland) Les Wallace (quarter-finals)
- ~~(Republic of Ireland) Colin McGarry~~

Starting in Preliminary round

- (England) Terry Jenkins (Preliminary round)
- (England) Kevin Painter (Preliminary round)
- (Canada) John Part (first round)
- (Netherlands) Roland Scholten (Preliminary round)

Qualifiers
Starting in Preliminary round

- (Canada) David Cameron (champion)
- (England) Wayne Jones (first round)

Highest Non-Qualifier On WSDT Order of Merit
Starting in Preliminary round

- (England) Richie Howson (semi-finals)

Fans' Vote Winner
Starting in Preliminary round

- (Singapore) Paul Lim (Preliminary round)

== Draw ==
The draw for the tournament was announced on 3 March 2022.

Preliminary round (best of 7 sets); 27–28 May
Kevin Painter 89.28	3
Q	David Cameron 89.37	4
Terry Jenkins 81.81	1
RQ	Richie Howson 88.98	4
Roland Scholten 76.99	1
Q	Wayne Jones 80.50	4
WC	Paul Lim 82.31	0
John Part 81.33	4

First round (best of 7 sets); 27–28 May
Robert Thornton 87.90	2
Q	David Cameron 87.06	4
Deta Hedman 64.54	0
Colin Monk 70.32	4
Bob Anderson 64.36	1
Keith Deller 76.09	4
Trina Gulliver 78.46	1
RQ	Richie Howson 78.78	4
Martin Adams 79.48	4
Q	Wayne Jones 77.21	2
Lisa Ashton 79.49	2
Tony O'Shea 84.98	4
John Lowe 66.50	1
Les Wallace 74.12	4
Phil Taylor 84.73	4
John Part 78.04	0

Quarter-finals (best of 7 sets); 29 May
Q	David Cameron 81.65	4
Colin Monk 77.37	2
Keith Deller 79.47	2
RQ	Richie Howson 84.76	4
Martin Adams 79.52	1
Tony O'Shea 84.59	4
Les Wallace 76.51	3
Phil Taylor 85.81	4

Semi-finals (best of 9 sets); 29 May
Q	David Cameron 93.14	5
RQ	Richie Howson 89.61	2
Tony O'Shea 80.56	1
Phil Taylor 85.26	5

Final (best of 11 sets); 29 May
Q	David Cameron 86.04	6
Phil Taylor 84.41	3

== Broadcasting rights ==
BT Sport aired the tournament in the United Kingdom, and Sport1 broadcast it in Germany.
