= 2022 US Darts Masters =

2022 bet365 US Darts Masters

Tournament information
- Dates: 3–4 June 2022
- Venue: Hulu Theater
- Location: New York City
- Country: United States
- Organisation(s): PDC
- Format: Legs
- Prize fund: £60,000
- Winner's share: £20,000
- High checkout: 130 Michael van Gerwen (x2)

Champion(s)
- Michael Smith

The 2022 bet365 US Darts Masters was the fourth staging of the tournament by the Professional Darts Corporation. It was the first event in the 2022 World Series of Darts. The tournament featured 16 players (8 PDC representatives, and 8 North American representatives), and was held at the Hulu Theater in New York City on 3–4 June 2022.

Nathan Aspinall was the defending champion after his 8–4 win over Michael Smith in the 2019 final, but he was not invited to take part in this tournament.

Smith won his second World Series title after defeating Michael van Gerwen 8–4 in the final.

== Prize money ==
The total prize fund remained at £60,000.

Position (no. of players)		Prize money (Total: £60,000)
Winner	(1)	£20,000
Runner-up	(1)	£10,000
Semi-finalists	(2)	£5,000
Quarter-finalists	(4)	£2,500
First round	(8)	£1,250

== Qualifiers ==
The PDC announced the 8 players who would be their elite representatives at the event on 11 April 2022, including Fallon Sherrock, who was denied her chance to appear on the 2020 World Series of Darts circuit, owing to the COVID-19 pandemic.

1. Peter Wright (semi-finals)
2. Gerwyn Price (semi-finals)
3. Michael van Gerwen (runner-up)
4. Michael Smith (champion)
5. James Wade (quarter-finals)
6. Gary Anderson (quarter-finals)
7. Jonny Clayton (quarter-finals)
8. Fallon Sherrock (first round)

The North American qualifiers consisted of their four PDC Tour Card holders (Jeff Smith, Danny Baggish, Matt Campbell and Jules van Dongen), plus four spaces at the CDC qualifier in Indianapolis on May 13. The winner of each of the two qualifiers, plus the two highest ranked players on the Order of Merit qualified.

Qualification	Player
PDC Tour Card Holders	Jeff Smith (first round)
PDC Tour Card Holders	Danny Baggish (first round)
PDC Tour Card Holders	Matt Campbell (first round)
PDC Tour Card Holders	Jules van Dongen (first round)
CDC Qualifiers	David Cameron (first round)
CDC Qualifiers	Leonard Gates (quarter-finals)
CDC Qualifier Order of Merit #1	Doug Boehm (first round)
CDC Qualifier Order of Merit #2	Danny Lauby (first round)

== Draw ==
The draw was made on 1 June in Times Square by Rod Harrington.

First round (best of 11 legs); 3 June
1	Peter Wright 90.65	6
Danny Baggish 82.62	4
Fallon Sherrock 71.44	2
Leonard Gates 87.83	6
4	Michael Smith 96.23	6
Doug Boehm 91.22	3
Gary Anderson 87.48	6
Matt Campbell 87.68	3
2	Gerwyn Price 90.73	6
David Cameron 94.78	4
Jonny Clayton 90.00	6
Danny Lauby 87.07	2
3	Michael van Gerwen 96.24	6
Jules van Dongen 90.60	4
James Wade 92.98	6
Jeff Smith 90.67	2

Quarter-finals (best of 15 legs); 4 June
1	Peter Wright 90.86	8
Leonard Gates 83.18	3
4	Michael Smith 93.16	8
Gary Anderson 89.72	3
2	Gerwyn Price 94.97	8
Jonny Clayton 96.82	7
3	Michael van Gerwen 98.58	8
James Wade 88.99	3

Semi-finals (best of 15 legs); 4 June
1	Peter Wright 92.85	6
4	Michael Smith 93.66	8
2	Gerwyn Price 97.99	4
3	Michael van Gerwen 99.61	8

Final (best of 15 legs); 4 June
4	Michael Smith 99.14	8
3	Michael van Gerwen 96.79	4
