= Trina Gulliver =

English darts player (born 1969)

Trina Gulliver MBE
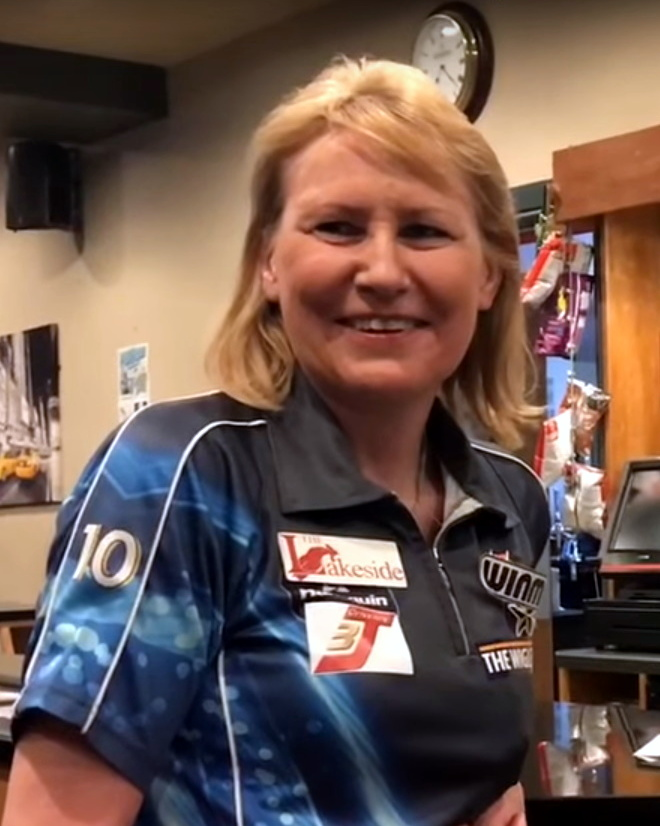
- Gulliver in 2018

Personal information
- Full name: Catrina Elizabeth Gulliver
- Nickname: Golden Girl
- Born: 30 November 1969 (age 56) Leamington Spa, Warwickshire, England

Sport
- Sport: Darts
- Playing since: 1983
- Darts: 25g Winmau Signature
- Laterality: Right-handed
- Walk-on music: "You Sexy Thing" by Hot Chocolate

Organisation (see split in darts)
- BDO: 1993–2020
- PDC: 2004–2005, 2021–
- WDF: 1993–2022

WDF major events – best performances
- World Championship: Winner (10): 2001, 2002, 2003, 2004, 2005, 2006, 2007, 2010, 2011, 2016
- World Masters: Winner (6): 2000, 2002, 2003, 2004, 2005, 2016
- World Trophy: Winner (1): 2003
- Finder Masters: Winner (1): 2010
- Dutch Open: Winner (5): 1999, 2007, 2009, 2011, 2013

PDC premier events – best performances
- Desert Classic: (Women's) Winner (2): 2004, 2005

WSDT major events – best performances
- World Championship: Last 16: 2023
- World Matchplay: Last 20: 2022
- World Masters: Last 16: 2022, 2023
- Champions: Quarter-final: 2023

Other tournament wins
- Years
Autumn Classic	2002
Belgium Open	1999, 2001, 2012
British Matchplay	1997
British Open	1998, 1999, 2000, 2001, 2004, 2008, 2010
British Women's Pentathlon	2004, 2005, 2006, 2007, 2009, 2011, 2012
British Classic	2000, 2001, 2003, 2005, 2008, 2011
BDO International Open	2009
BDO Women's Grand Slam	2003
Denmark Open	1999, 2004, 2005, 2006
Devon Open	2007, 2008, 2009, 2010, 2011, 2013
Embassy Gold Cup Singles	2000, 2003
England Open	1997, 1998, 2001, 2002, 2003, 2008, 2010
English Nationals	1999, 2000, 2002, 2004, 2009
England Masters	2009
Finnish Open	1999, 2001, 2002
German Open	1997, 2003, 2005, 2009
Golden Harvest Cup	2002
Granite City Open	2011
Kent Open	2007, 2008, 2009, 2010, 2011, 2013
Hemeco Open	2010
Irish Masters	2000, 2001
Isle of Man Open	2004, 2006
I.D.P.A. Masters	2002, 2003
Jersey Open	1999, 2000, 2001, 2003
Las Vegas Classic	2004, 2005
Northern Ireland Open	2005
Norway Open	1999, 2000, 2004, 2005
Pacific Masters	1997
PDC Women's Series	2022
Swedish Open	2000, 2002, 2012
Swiss Open	1997, 2006
Welsh Classic	2004
Welsh Open	1997, 2002, 2003, 2004, 2005, 2006, 2007, 2010
WDF Europe Cup Singles	2000, 2006
WDF Europe Cup Pairs	1998, 2004, 2006
WDF World Cup Singles	1999, 2003, 2011
WDF World Cup Pairs	1999, 2003, 2005, 2011, 2013

Other achievements
- She has the highest 3-dart average in the Women's World Championship; 95.96 v Clare Bywaters in 2006.

Catrina Elizabeth Gulliver MBE (born 30 November 1969) is an English professional darts player. She is a 10-time British Darts Organisation (BDO) Women's World Champion. Nicknamed "Golden Girl", she was named as the 2003 BBC Midlands Sports Personality of the Year.

== Early life ==
The daughter of publicans, Gulliver was born in Warneford Hospital in Leamington Spa, and started playing darts at the age of two at her parents pub in Southam, Warwickshire.

She trained as a carpenter and joiner, and later taught carpentry and joinery at Mid-Warwickshire College, Leamington Spa.

== Darts career ==
From the introduction of the BDO Women's World Championship, which Gulliver won in 2001, she remained undefeated in the competition through to 2007, until her defeat in the 2008 Championship by Anastasia Dobromyslova. During this undefeated run, Gulliver beat Francis Hoenselaar of the Netherlands to win the title on five occasions. Gulliver has the top three highest winning three dart averages in the Women's World Championship, all of which are higher than 90.

During the 2008 tournament Trina stated on many occasions that she was not happy with the prize money and the game length compared to the men's competition. In 2008 the women's champion only received £6,000, whereas the men's champion wins £95,000 and the male competition is first to seven sets whereas the women's is first to two. Despite this she did not enter the inaugural (and thus so far only) PDC Women's World Championship in 2010, that offered higher prize money than the BDO version.

Gulliver was beaten in the 2009 World Championship final by Hoenselaar. In 2010, Gulliver defeated Hoenselaar, Deta Hedman and Rhian Edwards all 2–0 to become world champion for the first time since 2007. In 2011, Gulliver defeated Wendy Weinstadtler, Irene Armstrong and Rhian Edwards all 2–0 to successfully defend the Women's World Championship.

Gulliver won the women's British Pentathlon eight times. She also played in the men's event on several occasions, with a best finish of 12th (out of 20 entrants) in the 2001 edition.

Gulliver has been sponsored by the darts brand Winmau for over 10 Years, and in 2003 was named as the BBC Midlands Sports Personality of the Year.

She was appointed Member of the Order of the British Empire (MBE) in the 2013 Birthday Honours for services to darts and to charitable fundraising.

She went on to win the BDO World Darts Championship one more time in 2016.

In March 2023, 'Trina' was gifted the World Championship trophy, to act as its custodian after being bought at auction by Peter Turrell of Leisure Promotions, sponsor of the World Senior Darts, at their event in Blackpool.

== Personal life ==
Gulliver married Paul Gulliver in 1994, after nine years together, and they lived in Southam, but divorced in 2005 after eleven years of marriage.

After the break up of her marriage, Gulliver became a secret alcoholic and used to drink four bottles of wine a night. She has spoken about her alcoholism and stated that, "I was lucky to survive".

Gulliver came out as gay after her divorce, although she kept it a secret from her family because she felt that she was going to "lose my sponsors, friends and whether my family would understand". She then lived in Cheddar, Somerset until 2017 with her England ladies' darts colleague Sue Gulliver. They signed a registered partnership in July 2010. As of 19 September 2022, her website stated she is "Married to Nicole van Gils".

Gulliver's mother Muriel died on 5 January 2012, two days before the start of the BDO World Darts Championship. Trina still took part in the competition, at the request of her mother before she died.

== Autobiography ==
2008 saw the publication of her autobiography, Golden Girl: The Autobiography of the Greatest Ever Ladies' Darts Player.

== World Championship results ==
=== BDO ===
- 2001: Winner (beat Mandy Solomons 2–1)
- 2002: Winner (beat Francis Hoenselaar 2–1)
- 2003: Winner (beat Anne Kirk 2–0)
- 2004: Winner (beat Francis Hoenselaar 2–0)
- 2005: Winner (beat Francis Hoenselaar 2–0)
- 2006: Winner (beat Francis Hoenselaar 2–0)
- 2007: Winner (beat Francis Hoenselaar 2–1)
- 2008: Runner-up (lost to Anastasia Dobromyslova 0–2)
- 2009: Runner-up (lost to Francis Hoenselaar 1–2)
- 2010: Winner (beat Rhian Edwards 2–0)
- 2011: Winner (beat Rhian Edwards 2–0)
- 2012: Semi-finals (lost to Anastasia Dobromyslova 0–2)
- 2013: Semi-finals (lost to Anastasia Dobromyslova 1–2)
- 2014: First round (lost to Tamara Schuur 0–2)
- 2015: Quarter-finals (lost to Lisa Ashton 0–2)
- 2016: Winner (beat Deta Hedman 3–2)
- 2017: Quarter-finals (lost to Aileen de Graaf 0–2)
- 2018: Semi-finals (lost to Anastasia Dobromyslova 0–2)
- 2019: Quarter-finals (lost to Lorraine Winstanley 0–2)

=== WSDT ===
- 2022: Second round (lost to Robert Thornton 0–3)
- 2023: First round (lost to Dennis Harbour 0–3)
- 2024: First round (lost to John Henderson 1–3)
- 2025: First round (lost to Ross Montgomery 0–3)

== Performance timeline ==
BDO

Tournament	2001	2002	2003	2004	2005	2006	2007	2008	2009	2010	2011	2012	2013	2014	2015	2016	2017	2018	2019
BDO Ranked televised events
World Championship	W	W	W	W	W	W	W	F	F	W	W	SF	SF	1R	QF	W	QF	SF	QF
