= Richie Howson =

English darts player (born 1965)

Personal information
- Full name: Richard Howson
- Nickname: "The Owl"
- Born: 19 December 1965 (age 60) Romford, London, England
- Home town: Rainham, London, England

Sport
- Sport: Darts
- Playing since: 1995
- Darts: 25g Legend
- Laterality: Right-handed
- Walk-on music: "Night Boat to Cairo" by Madness

Organisation (see split in darts)
- BDO: 2010–2012
- PDC: 2012–2020
- WDF: 2010–2012, 2022–

WDF major events – best performances
- World Masters: Last 24: 2011

PDC premier events – best performances
- UK Open: Last 64: 2011, 2012, 2013

WSDT major events – best performances
- World Championship: Runner-up: 2023
- World Matchplay: Semi-final: 2024
- World Masters: Runner-up: 2023
- Champions: Winner (1): 2024

Other tournament wins
- Years
Dover Open	2011
Viking Cup	2022
WSDT Open Series	2022, 2024
WSDT Series	2024
MODUS Super Series	2025

Richard Howson (born 19 December 1965) is an English professional darts player who competes in World Darts Federation (WDF) events.

Howson won the 2024 World Seniors Darts (WSD) Champion of Champions event and was the runner-up at both the 2023 World Seniors Darts Championship and the 2023 World Seniors Darts Masters.

== Career ==
In 2011, he played in British Darts Organisation (BDO) tournament World Masters where he beat Scott Mitchell by 3 legs to 0 and Paul Hogan whom he beat by 3 legs to 1 before losing in the last 24 to Andrew Gilding of England. He lost in the last 64 of the 2011 UK Open after falling to Michael van Gerwen 9 legs to 2, after beating Stephen Hardy and Tony Ayres.

In 2012, Howson won a PDC tour card on the first day of Q School. His best result of 2012 was reaching the quarter-finals of the sixth UK Open Qualifier where he lost 6–2 to Ian White. Howson again lost in the last 64 of the UK Open, in a 2–9 defeat to Andy Hamilton. He was ranked world number 69 going into 2013. Howson played in all eight of the UK Open Qualifiers with his best results being two last 32 defeats to qualify for the event itself where he lost in the last 64 for the third successive year this time 9–2 to Matt Padgett. The rest of the year proved to be disappointing for Howson as he failed to qualify for any European Tour events and could not advance beyond the last 64 in the 14 Players Championships he competed in.

He began 2014 89th in the world, well outside the top 64 who kept their PDC places and Howson therefore entered Q School to win his place back. He lost in the last 32 on the third day but couldn't advance beyond the last 256 on any of the other days to fall short of earning a new tour card. Howson now had PDPA Associate Member status which allowed him entry into all UK Open and European Tour qualifiers as well as the Challenge Tour. Howson failed to qualify for the UK Open for the first time but made the most out of an appearance at the final Players Championship of the year with wins over Mark Dudbridge, Terry Jenkins, Keegan Brown, and Christian Kist to reach his second career PDC quarter-final, where he lost 6–4 against Simon Whitlock.

Howson played in all 16 Challenge Tour events in 2015, with his best result being a quarter-final exit in the sixth tournament. He played in 12 of them in 2016, but couldn't get past the last 64 once.

Howson left the PDC in January 2020.

Howson rejoined the World Darts Federation in April 2022.

== World Championship results ==
=== WSDT ===
- 2022: Second round (lost to Martin Adams 2–3) (sets)
- 2023: Runner-up (lost to Robert Thornton 2–5)
- 2024: Second round (lost to Mark Dudbridge 2–3)
- 2025: First round (lost to Richie Burnett 1–3)

== Performance timeline ==
Tournament	2022	2023	2024	2025
World Seniors televised events
World Championship	2R	F	2R	1R
World Matchplay	DNP	QF	SF	NH
World Masters	SF	F	RR	NH
