= David Cameron (darts player) =

Canadian darts player

Personal information
- Nickname: "Excalibur"
- Born: 15 September 1969 (age 57) New Glasgow, Nova Scotia, Canada
- Home town: Fall River, Nova Scotia, Canada

Sport
- Sport: Darts
- Playing since: 1990
- Darts: 24g Cosmo Signature
- Laterality: Right-handed
- Walk-on music: "Shoot to Thrill" by AC/DC

Organisation (see split in darts)
- BDO: 1998–2020
- PDC: 2022–
- WDF: 1998–2022

WDF major events – best performances
- World Championship: Last 16: 2019
- World Masters: Last 80: 2013
- World Trophy: Last 32: 2014, 2015, 2016, 2019

PDC premier events – best performances
- World Championship: Last 64: 2023
- US Open/WSoD: Last 128: 2008

WSDT major events – best performances
- World Championship: Last 32: 2023, 2024
- World Masters: Winner (1): 2022
- Champions: Semi-final: 2023

Other tournament wins
- Years
Bob Jones Memorial	2015, 2018, 2019
Canadian Open	2011, 2017
CDC Cross-Border Challenge	2026
Klondike Open	2016, 2017
Las Vegas Open	2025
Newfoundland Spring Open	2013, 2014
Nova Scotia Open	2013
PEI Potato Open	2012, 2015
Phoenix Darts Open	2019
Port City Open	2018, 2020
Quebec Open	2013, 2018, 2020
Greater Vancouver Open	2014
Hub City Open	2018, 2019, 2020
Music City Classic	2019
NDFC Canadian Championship (x3)	2014, 2015, 2016
Seacoast Open	2016
Championship Darts Corporation (CDC) Pro Tour (x10)
2020 (x1); 2021 (x1); 2022 (x3); 2023 (x1); 2024 (x2); 2025 (x2)
Medal record
Men's Darts
Representing Canada
WDF World Cup
Gold medal – first place	2019 Cluj	Men's pairs
WDF Americas Cup
Gold medal – first place	2014 Tampa	Men's singles
Gold medal – first place	2016 St. Philip	Men's overall

David Cameron (born 15 September 1969) is a Canadian professional darts player who competes in World Darts Federation (WDF) and Professional Darts Corporation (PDC) tournaments. He is the 2022 World Seniors Darts Masters champion. Cameron has won 10 Championship Darts Corporation (CDC) Pro Tour titles.

== Career ==
Cameron has appeared at the BDO World Darts Championship six times, but hadn't got past the first round in his first five appearances, his only win coming against Jimmy Hendriks in 2017. In 2019 he reached the second round for the first time.

He also qualified for the first two editions of the PDC US Darts Masters in Las Vegas, as well as the 2022 and 2024 editions. However, he hasn't won a match yet in his four appearances. In 2017, he lost 6–5 to Dawson Murschell in the North American Championship before losing 6–3 to Raymond van Barneveld in the 2017 US Darts Masters. Cameron only managed one leg in the two tournaments in 2018, going out to John Norman Jnr and Michael Smith in the respective events.

Cameron took part in the 2022 WDF World Darts Championship where he was defeated in the 1st round by Ian Jones 2–1. Because of his early exit he was able to take part in the qualifiers for the 2022 World Seniors Darts Masters, taking an Uber to Reading from Lakeside on the Saturday where he qualified for the TV event, beating Paul Hogan 6–0 in the final game.

Cameron took part in the 2022 World Seniors Darts Masters after winning a qualifier. He beat Kevin Painter 4–3, Robert Thornton 4–2, Colin Monk 4–2, Richie Howson 5–2 and won the final 6–3 against 16-time World Champion Phil Taylor to become the inaugural winner of the event.

== World Championship results ==
=== BDO ===
- 2014: Preliminary round (lost to Martin Adams 1–3)
- 2015: Preliminary round (lost to Michel van der Horst 2–3)
- 2016: Preliminary round (lost to Ted Hankey 0–3)
- 2017: First round (lost to Danny Noppert 1–3)
- 2018: Preliminary round (lost to Michael Unterbuchner 2–3)
- 2019: Second round (lost to Kyle McKinstry 3–4)
- 2020: Preliminary round (lost to Nick Fullwell 1–3)

=== WDF ===
- 2022: First round (lost to Ian Jones 1–2)

=== PDC ===
- 2023: Second round (lost to Danny Noppert 1–3)
- 2024: First round (lost to Jamie Hughes 1–3)
- 2026: First round (lost to Mensur Suljović 1–3)

=== WSDT ===
- 2023: First round (lost to Richie Howson 2–3)
- 2024: First round (lost to Jim Long 1–3)

== Performance timeline ==
David Cameron's performance timeline is as follows:

CDC Tour

Season	1	2	3	4	5	6	7	8	9	10	11	12	13	14	15	16
2021	W	QF	QF	QF	QF	L32										
2022	L16	QF	L32	L32	W	W	L16	W	L16	QF	SF	QF				
2023	L16	QF	L32	L16	F	SF	SF	QF	SF	QF	W	F				
2024	QF	W	QF	QF	W	L32	F	L16	L64	QF	L16	QF	L64	QF		
2025	F	L16	QF	QF	QF	QF	L64	L16	W	SF	F	L64	L32	F	W	QF

== Career finals ==
=== Seniors major finals: 1 (1 title) ===
Outcome	No.	Year	Championship	Opponent	Score
Winner	1.	2022	World Seniors Darts Masters	(England) Phil Taylor	6–3 (s)
