= 2013 Grand Slam of Darts =

2013 William Hill Grand Slam of Darts

Tournament information
- Dates: 9–17 November 2013
- Venue: Wolverhampton Civic Hall
- Location: Wolverhampton
- Country: England
- Organisation(s): PDC
- Format: Legs
- Prize fund: £400,000
- Winner's share: £100,000
- High checkout: 170 (England) Ted Hankey (group stage)

Champion(s)
- (England) Phil Taylor

The 2013 William Hill Grand Slam of Darts, was the seventh staging of the tournament, organised by the Professional Darts Corporation. The event took place from 9–17 November 2013 at the Wolverhampton Civic Hall, Wolverhampton, England.

Raymond van Barneveld was the defending champion, but he was eliminated in the group stage. The semi-final match between Phil Taylor and Adrian Lewis saw the players average 109.76 and 110.99 respectively, in a match frequently described as one of the greatest darts matches ever. The PDC record of 31 maximums set in the 2007 World Championship final was broken as 32 were made in this match in 32 fewer legs. Taylor won the match 16–9 and went on to seal his fifth Grand Slam title by beating Robert Thornton 16–6 in the final.

== Prize money ==
Position (num. of players)		Prize money (Total: £400,000)
Winner	(1)	£100,000
Runner-up	(1)	£50,000
Semi-finalists	(2)	£25,000
Quarter-finalists	(4)	£15,000
Last 16 (second round)	(8)	£7,500
Third in group	(8)	£5,000
Fourth in group	(8)	£2,500
Group winner bonus	(8)	£2,500

== Qualifying ==
=== Qualifying tournaments ===
Players in italics had already qualified for the event.

==== PDC ====
Tournament	Year	Position	Player	Qualifiers
Grand Slam of Darts	2012	Winner	(Netherlands) Raymond van Barneveld	(Netherlands) Raymond van Barneveld (Netherlands) Michael van Gerwen (England) Andy Hamilton (England) Dean Winstanley (England) Phil Taylor (Scotland) Gary Anderson (England) Adrian Lewis (England) Mark Walsh (England) James Wade (Australia) Simon Whitlock (England) Dave Chisnall (England) Mervyn King (Scotland) Robert Thornton (Belgium) Kim Huybrechts (England) Kevin Painter (Wales) Mark Webster (England) Wes Newton (Belgium) Ronny Huybrechts (Australia) Paul Nicholson (England) Michael Smith (England) Ricky Evans
Grand Slam of Darts	2012	Runner-up	(Netherlands) Michael van Gerwen	
Grand Slam of Darts	2012	Semi-finalists	(England) Andy Hamilton (England) Dean Winstanley	
Grand Slam of Darts	2011	Winner	(England) Phil Taylor	
Grand Slam of Darts	2011	Runner-up	(Scotland) Gary Anderson	
Grand Slam of Darts	2011	Semi-finalists	(England) Adrian Lewis (England) Mark Walsh	
PDC World Darts Championship	2013	Winner	(England) Phil Taylor	
PDC World Darts Championship	2013	Runner-up	(Netherlands) Michael van Gerwen	
PDC World Darts Championship	2013	Semi-finalists	(Netherlands) Raymond van Barneveld	
PDC World Darts Championship	2013	Semi-finalists	(England) James Wade	
PDC World Darts Championship	2012	Winner	(England) Adrian Lewis	
PDC World Darts Championship	2012	Runner-up	(England) Andy Hamilton	
PDC World Darts Championship	2012	Semi-finalists	(Australia) Simon Whitlock	
PDC World Darts Championship	2012	Semi-finalists	(England) James Wade	
PDC World Darts Championship	2011	Winner	(England) Adrian Lewis	
PDC World Darts Championship	2010	Winner	(England) Phil Taylor	
PDC World Darts Championship	2009	Winner	(England) Phil Taylor	
World Matchplay	2013	Winner	(England) Phil Taylor	
World Matchplay	2013	Runner-up	(England) Adrian Lewis	
World Matchplay	2012	Winner	(England) Phil Taylor	
World Matchplay	2012	Runner-up	(England) James Wade	
World Grand Prix	2013	Winner	(England) Phil Taylor	
World Grand Prix	2013	Runner-up	(England) Dave Chisnall	
World Grand Prix	2012	Winner	(Netherlands) Michael van Gerwen	
World Grand Prix	2012	Runner-up	(England) Mervyn King	
UK Open	2013	Winner	(England) Phil Taylor	
UK Open	2013	Runner-up	(England) Andy Hamilton	
UK Open	2012	Winner	(Scotland) Robert Thornton	
UK Open	2012	Runner-up	(England) Phil Taylor	
Premier League Darts	2013	Winner	(Netherlands) Michael van Gerwen	
Premier League Darts	2013	Runner-up	(England) Phil Taylor	
Premier League Darts	2012	Winner	(England) Phil Taylor	
Premier League Darts	2012	Runner-up	(Australia) Simon Whitlock	
Championship League Darts	2013	Winner	(England) Phil Taylor	
Championship League Darts	2013	Runner-up	(Netherlands) Michael van Gerwen	
Championship League Darts	2012	Winner	(England) Phil Taylor	
Championship League Darts	2012	Runner-up	(Australia) Simon Whitlock	
Players Championship Finals	2012	Winner	(England) Phil Taylor	
Players Championship Finals	2012	Runner-up	(Belgium) Kim Huybrechts	
Players Championship Finals	2011 (2)	Winner	(England) Kevin Painter	
Players Championship Finals	2011 (2)	Runner-up	(Wales) Mark Webster	
European Championship	2013	Winner	(England) Adrian Lewis	
European Championship	2013	Runner-up	(Australia) Simon Whitlock	
European Championship	2012	Winner	(Australia) Simon Whitlock	
European Championship	2012	Runner-up	(England) Wes Newton	
PDC World Cup of Darts	2013	Winners	(England) Phil Taylor (England) Adrian Lewis	
PDC World Cup of Darts	2013	Runners-Up	(Belgium) Kim Huybrechts (Belgium) Ronny Huybrechts	
PDC World Cup of Darts	2012	Winners	(England) Phil Taylor (England) Adrian Lewis	
PDC World Cup of Darts	2012	Runners-Up	(Australia) Simon Whitlock (Australia) Paul Nicholson	
Masters	2013	Winner	(England) Phil Taylor	
Masters	2013	Runner-up	(England) Adrian Lewis	
PDC World Youth Championship	2013	Winner	(England) Michael Smith	
PDC World Youth Championship	2013	Runner-up	(England) Ricky Evans	
Note: Players in italics had already qualified for the tournament.

==== BDO ====
Tournament	Year	Position	Player	Qualifiers
BDO World Darts Championship	2013	Winner	(England) Scott Waites	(England) Scott Waites (England) Tony O'Shea (Netherlands) Wesley Harms (England) Richie George (Netherlands) Christian Kist (England) Ted Hankey
BDO World Darts Championship	2013	Runner-up	(England) Tony O'Shea	(England) Scott Waites (England) Tony O'Shea (Netherlands) Wesley Harms (England) Richie George (Netherlands) Christian Kist (England) Ted Hankey
BDO World Darts Championship	2013	Semi-finalists	(Netherlands) Wesley Harms (England) Richie George	(England) Scott Waites (England) Tony O'Shea (Netherlands) Wesley Harms (England) Richie George (Netherlands) Christian Kist (England) Ted Hankey
BDO World Darts Championship	2012	Winner	(Netherlands) Christian Kist	(England) Scott Waites (England) Tony O'Shea (Netherlands) Wesley Harms (England) Richie George (Netherlands) Christian Kist (England) Ted Hankey
BDO World Darts Championship	2012	Runner-up	(England) Tony O'Shea	(England) Scott Waites (England) Tony O'Shea (Netherlands) Wesley Harms (England) Richie George (Netherlands) Christian Kist (England) Ted Hankey
BDO World Darts Championship	2012	Semi-finalists	(Netherlands) Wesley Harms (England) Ted Hankey	(England) Scott Waites (England) Tony O'Shea (Netherlands) Wesley Harms (England) Richie George (Netherlands) Christian Kist (England) Ted Hankey
BDO World Darts Championship	2011	Winner	(England) ~~Martin Adams~~	(England) Scott Waites (England) Tony O'Shea (Netherlands) Wesley Harms (England) Richie George (Netherlands) Christian Kist (England) Ted Hankey
BDO World Darts Championship	2010	Winner	(England) ~~Martin Adams~~	(England) Scott Waites (England) Tony O'Shea (Netherlands) Wesley Harms (England) Richie George (Netherlands) Christian Kist (England) Ted Hankey
BDO World Darts Championship	2009	Winner	(England) Ted Hankey	(England) Scott Waites (England) Tony O'Shea (Netherlands) Wesley Harms (England) Richie George (Netherlands) Christian Kist (England) Ted Hankey
Note: Players in italics had already qualified for the tournament.				(England) Scott Waites (England) Tony O'Shea (Netherlands) Wesley Harms (England) Richie George (Netherlands) Christian Kist (England) Ted Hankey

==== Other qualifiers ====
Criteria	Player
PDC Challenge Tour Order of Merit Leader	(England) Ross Smith
Grand Slam of Darts Wildcards	(England) Justin Pipe (Netherlands) Vincent van der Voort (Scotland) Peter Wright (England) Stuart Kellett

== Pools ==
Pool A	Pool B	Pool C	Pool D
(Seeded Players)	(qualifiers)		
(England) Phil Taylor (1) (Netherlands) Raymond van Barneveld (2) (England) Scott Waites (3) (Netherlands) Michael van Gerwen (4) (England) Adrian Lewis (5) (Australia) Simon Whitlock (6) (England) Andy Hamilton (7) (England) James Wade (8)	(Scotland) Gary Anderson (England) Dave Chisnall (Belgium) Kim Huybrechts (England) Mervyn King (Netherlands) Christian Kist (England) Wes Newton (England) Kevin Painter (Scotland) Robert Thornton	(Netherlands) Wesley Harms (Belgium) Ronny Huybrechts (Australia) Paul Nicholson (England) Tony O'Shea (England) Michael Smith (England) Mark Walsh (Wales) Mark Webster (England) Dean Winstanley	(England) Ricky Evans (England) Richie George (England) Ted Hankey (England) Stuart Kellett (England) Justin Pipe (England) Ross Smith (Netherlands) Vincent van der Voort (Scotland) Peter Wright

== Draw ==
=== Group stage ===
All matches first-to-5/best of 9
NB in Brackets: Number = Seeds; BDO = BDO Darts player; RQ = Ranking qualifier; Q = Qualifier
NB: P = Played; W = Won; L = Lost; LF = Legs for; LA = Legs against; +/- = Plus/minus record, in relation to legs; Average – 3-dart average; Pts = Points; Q = Qualified for K.O. phase

==== Group A ====
Pos.	Player	P	W	L	LF	LA	+/-	Pts	Status
1	(England) Phil Taylor (1)	3	3	0	15	1	+14	6	Q
2	(Australia) Paul Nicholson	3	2	1	11	9	+2	4	Q
3	(England) Stuart Kellett (Q)	3	1	2	7	14	–7	2	Eliminated
4	(England) Kevin Painter	3	0	3	6	15	–9	0	Eliminated

9 November

82.54 Kevin Painter (England)	2 – 5	(Australia) Paul Nicholson 90.66
112.16 Phil Taylor (England)	5 – 0	(England) Stuart Kellett 91.45

10 November

83.71 Kevin Painter (England)	4 – 5	(England) Stuart Kellett 93.92
104.51 Phil Taylor (England)	5 – 1	(Australia) Paul Nicholson 82.43

12 November

93.96 Paul Nicholson (Australia)	5 – 2	(England) Stuart Kellett 86.26
104.38 Phil Taylor (England)	5 – 0	(England) Kevin Painter 98.45

==== Group B ====
Pos.	Player	P	W	L	LF	LA	+/-	Pts	Status
1	(England) James Wade (8)	3	3	0	15	7	+8	6	Q
2	(Scotland) Gary Anderson	3	2	1	13	7	+6	4	Q
3	(Scotland) Peter Wright (Q)	3	1	2	8	12	–4	2	Eliminated
4	(Netherlands) Wesley Harms (BDO)	3	0	3	5	15	–10	0	Eliminated

9 November

107.14 Gary Anderson (Scotland)	5 – 1	(Netherlands) Wesley Harms 96.18
94.38 James Wade (England)	5 – 2	(Scotland) Peter Wright 100.50

10 November

97.23 Peter Wright (Scotland)	5 – 2	(Netherlands) Wesley Harms 95.59
93.50 James Wade (England)	5 – 3	(Scotland) Gary Anderson 94.48

12 November

96.64 James Wade (England)	5 – 2	(Netherlands) Wesley Harms 91.17
111.80 Gary Anderson (Scotland)	5 – 1	(Scotland) Peter Wright 99.90

==== Group C ====
Pos.	Player	P	W	L	LF	LA	+/-	Pts	Status
1	(Belgium) Ronny Huybrechts	3	3	0	15	9	+6	6	Q
2	(England) Adrian Lewis (5)	3	2	1	13	10	+3	4	Q
3	(Netherlands) Christian Kist (BDO)	3	1	2	11	12	–1	2	Eliminated
4	(England) Richie George (BDO)	3	0	3	7	15	–8	0	Eliminated

9 November

91.47 Christian Kist (Netherlands)	3 – 5	(Belgium) Ronny Huybrechts 89.95
85.16 Adrian Lewis (England)	5 – 2	(England) Richie George 77.39

10 November

96.68 Christian Kist (Netherlands)	5 – 2	(England) Richie George 85.66
101.26 Adrian Lewis (England)	3 – 5	(Belgium) Ronny Huybrechts 95.59

12 November

92.14 Ronny Huybrechts (Belgium)	5 – 3	(England) Richie George 87.07
94.15 Adrian Lewis (England)	5 – 3	(Netherlands) Christian Kist 90.79

==== Group D ====
Pos.	Player	P	W	L	LF	LA	+/-	Pts	Status
1	(Netherlands) Michael van Gerwen (4)	3	3	0	15	8	+7	6	Q
2	(Belgium) Kim Huybrechts	3	1	2	11	10	+1	2	Q
3	(England) Dean Winstanley	3	1	2	9	12	–3	2	Eliminated
4	(Netherlands) Vincent van der Voort (Q)	3	1	2	8	13	–5	2	Eliminated

9 November

90.35 Michael van Gerwen (Netherlands)	5 – 3	(Netherlands) Vincent van der Voort 91.01
99.88 Kim Huybrechts (Belgium)	2 – 5	(England) Dean Winstanley 97.97

10 November

90.54 Kim Huybrechts (Belgium)	5 – 0	(Netherlands) Vincent van der Voort 78.89
98.64 Michael van Gerwen (Netherlands)	5 – 1	(England) Dean Winstanley 94.62

12 November

85.73 Dean Winstanley (England)	3 – 5	(Netherlands) Vincent van der Voort 89.63
98.75 Michael van Gerwen (Netherlands)	5 – 4	(Belgium) Kim Huybrechts 91.04

==== Group E ====
Pos.	Player	P	W	L	LF	LA	+/-	Pts	Status
1	(England) Tony O'Shea (BDO)	3	2	1	14	10	+4	4	Q
2	(England) Mervyn King	3	2	1	14	10	+4	4	Q
3	(Netherlands) Raymond van Barneveld (2)	3	2	1	13	11	+2	4	Eliminated
4	(England) Ricky Evans	3	0	3	5	15	–10	0	Eliminated

9 November

89.49 Mervyn King (England)	4 – 5	(England) Tony O'Shea 96.64
98.09 Raymond van Barneveld (Netherlands)	5 – 2	(England) Ricky Evans 88.81

10 November

101.81 Mervyn King (England)	5 – 2	(England) Ricky Evans 96.57
95.57 Raymond van Barneveld (Netherlands)	5 – 4	(England) Tony O'Shea 101.04

11 November

95.93 Tony O'Shea (England)	5 – 1	(England) Ricky Evans 95.33
85.40 Raymond van Barneveld (Netherlands)	3 – 5	(England) Mervyn King 98.00

==== Group F ====
Pos.	Player	P	W	L	LF	LA	+/-	Pts	Status
1	(Scotland) Robert Thornton	3	2	1	14	7	+7	4	Q
2	(England) Andy Hamilton (7)	3	2	1	12	10	+2	4	Q
3	(England) Justin Pipe (Q)	3	1	2	9	12	–3	2	Eliminated
4	(England) Mark Walsh	3	1	2	6	12	–6	2	Eliminated

9 November

93.94 Robert Thornton (Scotland)	5 – 0	(England) Mark Walsh 78.56
95.50 Andy Hamilton (England)	2 – 5	(England) Justin Pipe 96.63

10 November

98.57 Andy Hamilton (England)	5 – 1	(England) Mark Walsh 88.93
89.84 Robert Thornton (Scotland)	5 – 2	(England) Justin Pipe 81.98

11 November

100.08 Justin Pipe (England)	2 – 5	(England) Mark Walsh 95.08
88.08 Andy Hamilton (England)	5 – 4	(Scotland) Robert Thornton 94.52

==== Group G ====
Pos.	Player	P	W	L	LF	LA	+/-	Pts	Status
1	(Australia) Simon Whitlock (6)	3	2	1	14	8	+6	4	Q
2	(Wales) Mark Webster	3	2	1	11	10	+1	4	Nine Dart Shootout
2	(England) Wes Newton	3	2	1	12	11	+1	4	Nine Dart Shootout
4	(England) Ross Smith (RQ)	3	0	3	7	15	–8	0	Eliminated

9 November

94.17 Wes Newton (England)	2 – 5	(Wales) Mark Webster 94.17
97.46 Simon Whitlock (Australia)	5 – 2	(England) Ross Smith 90.24

10 November

88.37 Wes Newton (England)	5 – 2	(England) Ross Smith 85.58
108.78 Simon Whitlock (Australia)	5 – 1	(Wales) Mark Webster 97.38

11 November

93.34 Mark Webster (Wales)	5 – 3	(England) Ross Smith 81.75
97.15 Simon Whitlock (Australia)	4 – 5	(England) Wes Newton 102.02

==== Group H ====
Pos.	Player	P	W	L	LF	LA	+/-	Pts	Status
1	(England) Scott Waites (BDO, 3)	3	3	0	15	6	+9	6	Q
2	(England) Ted Hankey	3	2	1	13	9	+4	4	Q
3	(England) Michael Smith	3	1	2	8	13	–5	2	Eliminated
4	(England) Dave Chisnall	3	0	3	7	15	–8	0	Eliminated

9 November

87.63 Scott Waites (England)	5 – 3	(England) Ted Hankey 82.43
99.47 Dave Chisnall (England)	3 – 5	(England) Michael Smith 103.17

10 November

99.84 Dave Chisnall (England)	3 – 5	(England) Ted Hankey 95.45
93.51 Scott Waites (England)	5 – 2	(England) Michael Smith 88.84

11 November

86.97 Ted Hankey (England)	5 – 1	(England) Michael Smith 81.58
90.70 Scott Waites (England)	5 – 1	(England) Dave Chisnall 88.20

===== Nine-dart shootout =====
With Wes Newton and Mark Webster finishing level on points and leg difference, a nine-dart shootout between the two took place to see who would play Scott Waites in the second round. The match took place after the conclusion of Monday's group matches, and was the first time since the 2009 Grand Slam of Darts that a nine-dart shootout was required.

POS	Player	1	2	3	4	5	6	7	8	9	Pts	Status
2	(Wales) Mark Webster	60	60	15	60	20	57	–	–	–	272	Advanced to the last 16
3	(England) Wes Newton	15	20	5	60	20	20	20	20	19	199	Eliminated

=== Knockout stage ===
Second round (best of 19 legs); 13–14 November
A1	(England) Phil Taylor (1) 102.56	10
B2	(Scotland) Gary Anderson 106.13	5
B1	(England) James Wade (8) 91.54	10
A2	(Australia) Paul Nicholson 87.77	1
C1	(Belgium) Ronny Huybrechts 91.25	5
D2	(Belgium) Kim Huybrechts 97.83	10
D1	(Netherlands) Michael van Gerwen (4) 97.88	8
C2	(England) Adrian Lewis (5) 105.24	10
E1	(England) Tony O'Shea (BDO) 94.93	10
F2	(England) Andy Hamilton (7) 92.86	7
F1	(Scotland) Robert Thornton 95.72	10
E2	(England) Mervyn King 93.83	8
G1	(Australia) Simon Whitlock (6) 91.25	9
H2	(England) Ted Hankey 85.88	10
H1	(England) Scott Waites (BDO,3) 94.39	10
G2	(Wales) Mark Webster 90.99	6

Quarter-finals (best of 31 legs); 15–16 November
A1	(England) Phil Taylor (1) 97.89	16
B1	(England) James Wade (8) 96.19	12
D2	(Belgium) Kim Huybrechts 95.73	11
C2	(England) Adrian Lewis (5) 100.16	16
E1	(England) Tony O'Shea (BDO) 93.79	6
F1	(Scotland) Robert Thornton 95.30	16
H2	(England) Ted Hankey 84.96	10
H1	(England) Scott Waites (BDO,3) 92.55	16

Semi-finals (best of 31 legs); 17 November
A1	(England) Phil Taylor (1) 109.76	16
C2	(England) Adrian Lewis (5) 110.99	9
F1	(Scotland) Robert Thornton 101.03	16
H1	(England) Scott Waites (BDO,3) 96.98	9

Final (best of 31 legs); 17 November
A1	(England) Phil Taylor (1) 98.14	16
F1	(Scotland) Robert Thornton 97.02	6

== Statistics ==
Player	Eliminated	Played	Legs Won	Legs Lost	LWAT	100+	140+	180s	High checkout	3-dart average
(England) Phil Taylor	Winner	7	73	33	31	143	75	32	167	104.20
(Scotland) Robert Thornton	Runner-up	7	62	46	28	134	103	27	161	95.34
(England) Adrian Lewis	Semi-finals	6	51	45	19	101	54	52	120	99.49
(England) Scott Waites	Semi-finals	6	50	38	23	128	56	21	146	92.63
(England) Tony O'Shea	Quarter-finals	5	30	33	14	76	58	20	123	96.47
(Belgium) Kim Huybrechts	Quarter-finals	5	32	31	12	69	33	23	148	95.00
(England) James Wade	Quarter-finals	5	37	24	20	66	55	7	160	94.51
(England) Ted Hankey	Quarter-finals	5	33	34	11	75	51	9	170	87.14
(Scotland) Gary Anderson	Second round	4	18	17	7	54	28	10	144	104.89
(Australia) Simon Whitlock	Second round	4	23	18	7	58	23	11	122	98.66
(Netherlands) Michael van Gerwen	Second round	4	23	18	7	57	23	12	135	96.41
(England) Mervyn King	Second round	4	22	20	8	54	31	10	141	95.78
(Wales) Mark Webster	Second round	4	17	20	6	47	13	10	164	93.97
(England) Andy Hamilton	Second round	4	19	20	8	37	24	16	136	93.75
(Belgium) Ronny Huybrechts	Second round	4	20	19	5	52	26	8	108	92.23
(Australia) Paul Nicholson	Second round	4	12	19	5	39	15	7	125	88.71
(Scotland) Peter Wright	Group stage	3	8	12	4	23	16	8	121	99.21
(England) Dave Chisnall	Group stage	3	7	15	4	21	16	10	97	95.84
(England) Wes Newton	Group stage	3	12	11	4	28	20	2	70	94.85
(Netherlands) Wesley Harms	Group stage	3	5	15	3	34	15	2	96	94.31
(England) Ricky Evans	Group stage	3	5	15	1	18	19	4	76	93.57
(Netherlands) Raymond van Barneveld	Group stage	3	13	11	5	41	19	0	96	93.02
(Netherlands) Christian Kist	Group stage	3	11	12	3	28	11	6	124	92.98
(England) Justin Pipe	Group stage	3	9	12	2	32	12	5	101	92.90
(England) Dean Winstanley	Group stage	3	9	12	3	27	16	3	91	92.77
(England) Michael Smith	Group stage	3	8	13	3	26	14	5	121	91.20
(England) Stuart Kellett	Group stage	3	9	14	3	27	10	5	78	90.54
(England) Kevin Painter	Group stage	3	7	15	2	22	14	3	116	88.14
(England) Mark Walsh	Group stage	3	6	12	2	26	10	2	101	87.52
(Netherlands) Vincent van der Voort	Group stage	3	8	13	3	20	16	2	80	86.51
(England) Ross Smith	Group stage	3	7	15	1	27	15	0	40	85.86
(England) Richie George	Group stage	3	7	15	1	20	15	2	80	83.37

Source: Match reports from the draw.
