= Scottish Open =

Scottish Open may refer to:

- Scottish Open (golf), a golf tournament on the European Tour
- Scottish Senior Open, a golf tournament on the European Seniors Tour
- Scottish Open (badminton), an open international badminton championships held in Scotland since 1907
- Scottish Open (darts), a professional darts tournament first held in 1983
- Scottish Open (snooker), a professional snooker tournament
- Scottish Open (fencing), a fencing competition held in Edinburgh in early January
- Scottish Open (speedway), a motorcycle speedway championship
