= 2015 World Grand Prix =

2015 World Grand Prix may refer to:

- 2015 World Grand Prix (darts)
- 2015 World Grand Prix (snooker)
