= 2017 Scottish Open =

2017 Scottish Open may refer to:

- 2017 Scottish Open (badminton)
- 2017 Scottish Open (snooker)
- 2017 Scottish Open (darts)
- 2017 Scottish Open (golf)
- 2017 Scottish Open (speedway)
