= 2008 Dutch Open =

2008 Dutch Open may refer to:

- 2008 Dutch Open (tennis)
- 2008 Dutch Open (darts)
