= 2023 World Seniors Darts Championship =

2023 JENNINGSbet World Seniors Darts Championship

Tournament information
- Dates: 9–12 February 2023
- Venue: Circus Tavern
- Location: Purfleet, England
- Organisation(s): World Seniors Darts Tour
- Format: Sets
- Prize fund: £80,000
- Winner's share: £30,000
- High checkout: 167 Kevin Painter

Champion(s)
- Robert Thornton

The 2023 World Seniors Darts Championship (known for sponsorship reasons as the 2023 JENNINGSbet World Seniors Darts Championship) was the second World Seniors Darts Championship organised by the World Seniors Darts Tour. It took place at the Circus Tavern in Purfleet between 9 and 12 February 2023. The event was open to players over the age of 50, except current PDC Tour Card holders. The tournament was expanded from 24 to 32 players.

Robert Thornton, the defending champion after winning the inaugural tournament in 2022, successfully defended his title by beating Richie Howson 5–2 in the final.

== Prize money ==
The prize fund for the event was £80,000, with £30,000 going to the champion.

Position (no. of players)		Prize money (Total: £80,000)
Winner	(1)	£30,000
Runner-up	(1)	£13,000
Semi-finalists	(2)	£4,500
Quarter-finalists	(4)	£2,000
Second round	(8)	£1,000
First round	(16)	£750

== Qualifiers ==
The first players announced to take part in the event were Robert Thornton, Phil Taylor, Martin Adams, John Part, Trina Gulliver and Keith Deller.

Three more invited players were announced in October, Mark Dudbridge, Co Stompé and Chris Mason. Mason previously stated that he would rather qualify by the open qualifications, but after an impressive start in the MODUS Super Series tournaments, he accepted his spot as an invited player.

In early November, five more players were announced. The group of competitors has been enlarged by Roland Scholten, Peter Manley, Terry Jenkins, Ronnie Baxter and Les Wallace. Glen Durrant received an invitation to take part in this tournament after his official retirement from a professional career.

More contestants were announced in December. The invitation to participate in the tournament was accepted by Bob Anderson, Larry Butler, David Cameron, Neil Duff, Kevin Painter, Tony O'Shea and Darryl Fitton. Two days later, the seed list was announced.

Seeded players

1. Robert Thornton (champion)
2. Phil Taylor (quarter-finals)
3. Martin Adams (second round)
4. Glen Durrant (first round)
5. Trina Gulliver (first round)
6. John Part (second round)
7. David Cameron (first round)
8. Neil Duff (quarter-finals)
9. Keith Deller (second round)
10. Bob Anderson (first round)
11. Les Wallace (first round)
12. Kevin Painter (semi-finals)
13. Terry Jenkins (second round)
14. Tony O'Shea (first round)
15. Larry Butler (first round)
16. Peter Manley (first round)

Invited players

- Ronnie Baxter (first round)
- Mark Dudbridge (quarter-finals)
- Darryl Fitton (quarter-finals)
- Leonard Gates (semi-finals)
- Chris Mason (first round)
- Scott Mitchell (second round)
- Roland Scholten (first round)
- Co Stompé (first round)

Qualifiers

- Michael Huntley (first round)
- Dennis Harbour (second round)
- Richie Howson (runner-up)

World Seniors Tour ranking qualifiers

- Darren Johnson (second round)
- Colin McGarry (first round)
- Dave Prins (first round)
- Lisa Ashton (first round)
- Andy Jenkins (second round)

== Draw ==
First round (best of 5 sets); 9–10 February
1	Robert Thornton 93.66	3
Roland Scholten 73.55	0
16	Peter Manley 69.14	0
Scott Mitchell 83.58	3
8	Neil Duff 88.99	3
RQ	Lisa Ashton 87.07	2
9	Keith Deller 75.07	3
Q	Michael Huntley 74.41	2
4	Glen Durrant 76.65	0
Mark Dudbridge 89.08	3
13	Terry Jenkins 88.89	3
Chris Mason 81.84	2
5	Trina Gulliver 75.30	0
Q	Dennis Harbour 85.30	3
12	Kevin Painter 86.69	3
Ronnie Baxter 72.32	0
2	Phil Taylor 82.36	3
RQ	Colin McGarry 82.80	2
15	Larry Butler 78.49	2
RQ	Darren Johnson 81.29	3
7	David Cameron 88.41	2
Q	Richie Howson 84.22	3
10	Bob Anderson 74.41	0
RQ	Andy Jenkins 83.93	3
3	Martin Adams 78.62	3
RQ	Dave Prins 77.59	1
14	Tony O'Shea 80.40	0
Leonard Gates 85.19	3
6	John Part 73.65	3
Co Stompé 69.31	2
11	Les Wallace 76.79	2
Darryl Fitton 78.83	3

Second round (best of 5 sets); 11 February
1	Robert Thornton 90.43	3
Scott Mitchell 84.73	0
8	Neil Duff 88.79	3
9	Keith Deller 75.27	0
Mark Dudbridge 88.65	3
13	Terry Jenkins 88.74	1
Q	Dennis Harbour 85.16	0
12	Kevin Painter 86.15	3
2	Phil Taylor 83.93	3
RQ	Darren Johnson 80.13	1
Q	Richie Howson 86.55	3
RQ	Andy Jenkins 78.67	1
3	Martin Adams 87.17	0
Leonard Gates 96.90	3
6	John Part 78.53	2
Darryl Fitton 80.88	3

Quarter-finals (best of 5 sets); 12 February
1	Robert Thornton 98.72	3
8	Neil Duff 89.67	1
Mark Dudbridge 88.63	1
12	Kevin Painter 89.10	3
2	Phil Taylor 82.27	1
Q	Richie Howson 87.28	3
Leonard Gates 94.51	3
Darryl Fitton 87.84	1

Semi-finals (best of 5 sets); 12 February
1	Robert Thornton 89.50	3
12	Kevin Painter 80.15	0
Q	Richie Howson 89.47	3
Leonard Gates 87.99	1

Final (best of 9 sets); 12 February
1	Robert Thornton 90.57	5
Q	Richie Howson 90.97	2

== Statistics ==
=== Top averages ===
This table shows the highest averages achieved by players throughout the tournament.

#	Player	Round	Average	Result
1	(Scotland) Robert Thornton	QF	98.72	Won
2	(United States) Leonard Gates	R2	96.90	Won
3	(United States) Leonard Gates (2)	QF	94.51	Won
4	(Scotland) Robert Thornton (2)	R1	93.66	Won
5	(England) Richie Howson	F	90.97	Lost
6	(Scotland) Robert Thornton (3)	F	90.57	Won
7	(Scotland) Robert Thornton (4)	R2	90.43	Won
8	(Northern Ireland) Neil Duff	QF	89.67	Lost
9	(Scotland) Robert Thornton (5)	SF	89.50	Won
10	(England) Richie Howson (2)	SF	89.47	Won

== Representation ==
This table shows the number of players by country in the 2023 World Seniors Darts Championship. A total of seven nationalities were represented.

	(England) ENG	(Scotland) SCO	(United States) USA	(Northern Ireland) NIR	(Canada) CAN	(Netherlands) NED	(Wales) WAL	Total
Final	1	1	0	0	0	0	0	2
Semi-finals	2	1	1	0	0	0	0	4
Quarter-finals	5	1	1	1	0	0	0	8
Second round	12	1	1	1	1	0	0	16
First round	21	2	2	2	2	2	1	32
Total	21	2	2	2	2	2	1	32
