= Scottish Open (darts) =

Tournament information
- Venue: Normandy Cosmopolitan Hotel
- Location: Renfrew
- Country: Scotland
- Established: 1995
- Organisation(s): WDF
- Format: Legs
- Prize fund: £7,210

Current champion(s)
- James Beeton (men's); Rebecca Allen (women's)

The Scottish Open is a darts tournament organised by the Scottish Darts Association and has been staged every year in February in 1983 and since 1995. The current venue is the Normandy Cosmopolitan Hotel in Renfrew. In 2014 Robbie Green became the first player to win the tournament on more than one occasion, with the previous 20 tournaments won by 20 different players, Wesley Harms has since achieved this feat. In the Ladies Deta Hedman has won the event 7 times including 2023.

Entries for this event used to be around 1,300 men around the early 2010s. With different factors at play this has been reduced to around 500.

The British Darts Organisation created two new events (the England Open and the Scottish Open) in 1995, which could have been in response to the split in darts which had seen many of the top players leave the organisation to start the WDC (now the PDC).

== List of tournaments ==
=== Men's ===
| Year | Champion | Av. | Score | Runner-Up | Av. | Prize Money | | | Venue |
| Year | Champion | Av. | Score | Runner-Up | Av. | Total | Ch. | R.-Up | Venue |
|---|---|---|---|---|---|---|---|---|---|
| 1983 | (Australia) Russell Stewart | n/a | beat | (Australia) Terry O'Dea | n/a | £2,800 | £1,500 | £500 | Ingliston Hall, Edinburgh |
| 1995 | (England) Chris Mason | n/a | 3 – 0 | (England) Colin Monk | n/a | £2,640 | £1,200 | £500 | Forum, Livingstone |
| 1996 | (Wales) Mark Salmon | n/a | 3 – 2 | (Wales) Sean Palfrey | n/a | £2,640 | £1,200 | £500 | Forum, Livingstone |
| 1997 | (England) Bob Arrowsmith | n/a | 3 – 2 | (Wales) Ritchie Davies | n/a | £2,640 | £1,200 | £500 | Forum, Livingstone |
| 1998 | (Scotland) Peter Johnstone | n/a | 3 – 2 | (England) Peter Manley | n/a | £2,640 | £1,200 | £500 | Stakis Airport Hotel, Glasgow |
| 1999 | (England) Denis Ovens | n/a | 3 – 0 | (England) Chris Mason | n/a | £2,640 | £1,200 | £500 | Normandy Cosmopolitan Hotel, Renfrew |
| 2000 | (England) Bob Aldous | n/a | 3 – 2 | (England) Andy Smith | n/a | £2,640 | £1,200 | £500 | Normandy Cosmopolitan Hotel, Renfrew |
| 2001 | (England) John Walton | n/a | 3 – 2 | (England) Tony Eccles | n/a | £2,640 | £1,200 | £500 | Normandy Cosmopolitan Hotel, Renfrew |
| 2002 | (Wales) Ritchie Davies | 96.51 | 3 – 2 | (England) Tony Eccles | 91.41 | £2,640 | £1,200 | £500 | Normandy Cosmopolitan Hotel, Renfrew |
| 2003 | (England) Davy Richardson | n/a | 3 – 1 | (England) Mike Gregory | n/a | £2,640 | £1,200 | £500 | Normandy Cosmopolitan Hotel, Renfrew |
| 2004 | (Scotland) Mike Veitch | n/a | 3 – 2 | (England) Martin Atkins | n/a | £3,400 | £1,400 | £600 | Normandy Cosmopolitan Hotel, Renfrew |
| 2005 | (England) Martin Adams | 114.00 | 3 – 1 | (Scotland) Gary Anderson | 100.86 | £3,400 | £1,400 | £600 | Normandy Cosmopolitan Hotel, Renfrew |
| 2006 | (Sweden) Göran Klemme | 102.21 | 3 – 1 | (Scotland) Ross Montgomery | 83.49 | £3,400 | £1,400 | £600 | Normandy Cosmopolitan Hotel, Renfrew |
| 2007 | (Scotland) Gary Anderson | 88.74 | 5 – 3 | (England) Scott Waites | 83.40 | £4,560 | £2,000 | £800 | Normandy Cosmopolitan Hotel, Renfrew |
| 2008 | (England) Garry Thompson | n/a | 5 – 1 | (England) Shaun Greatbatch | n/a | £4,560 | £2,000 | £800 | Normandy Cosmopolitan Hotel, Renfrew |
| 2009 | (England) Tony O'Shea | n/a | 5 – 4 | (England) Martin Atkins | n/a | £5,040 | £2,000 | £800 | Normandy Cosmopolitan Hotel, Renfrew |
| 2010 | (England) Stuart Kellett | n/a | 6 – 3 | (Netherlands) Dennis te Kloese | n/a | £5,040 | £2,000 | £800 | Normandy Cosmopolitan Hotel, Renfrew |
| 2011 | (England) Robbie Green | n/a | 5 – 4 | (England) Clive Barden | n/a | £5,510 | £2,250 | £1,000 | Normandy Cosmopolitan Hotel, Renfrew |
| 2012 | (England) Tony Eccles | n/a | 5 – 3 | (England) Robbie Green | n/a | £5,510 | £2,250 | £1,000 | Normandy Cosmopolitan Hotel, Renfrew |
| 2013 | (Netherlands) Wesley Harms | n/a | 5 – 4 | (Wales) Jim Williams | n/a | £8,180 | £3,000 | £1,500 | Normandy Cosmopolitan Hotel, Renfrew |
| 2014 | (England) Robbie Green (2) | n/a | 6 – 4 | (England) Jamie Hughes | n/a | £8,180 | £3,000 | £1,500 | Normandy Cosmopolitan Hotel, Renfrew |
| 2015 | (England) Dennis Harbour | 84.48 | 6 – 5 | (England) Glen Durrant | 88.50 | £8,180 | £3,000 | £1,500 | Normandy Cosmopolitan Hotel, Renfrew |
| 2016 | (Netherlands) Danny Noppert | 100.20 | 6 – 0 | (Wales) Dean Reynolds | 85.89 | £8,180 | £3,000 | £1,500 | Normandy Cosmopolitan Hotel, Renfrew |
| 2017 | (Scotland) Cameron Menzies | n/a | 6 – 2 | (England) Daniel Day | n/a | £8,180 | £3,000 | £1,500 | Normandy Cosmopolitan Hotel, Renfrew |
| 2018 | (Netherlands) Richard Veenstra | n/a | 6 – 3 | (England) Gary Robson | n/a | £8,180 | £3,000 | £1,500 | Normandy Cosmopolitan Hotel, Renfrew |
| 2019 | (Netherlands) Wesley Harms (2) | n/a | 6 – 5 | (New Zealand) Cody Harris | n/a | £8,180 | £3,000 | £1,500 | Normandy Cosmopolitan Hotel, Renfrew |
| 2020 | (Wales) Jim Williams | 99.70 | 6 – 2 | (England) Steve Hine | 79.20 | £8,180 | £3,000 | £1,500 | Normandy Cosmopolitan Hotel, Renfrew |
| 2022 | James Hurrell | 80.49 | 6 – 2 | Ryan Murray | 78.55 | £8,180 | £3,000 | £1,500 | Normandy Cosmopolitan Hotel, Renfrew |
| 2023 | Jordan Brooks | 88.41 | 6 – 4 | Martin Atkins | 86.84 | £8,180 | £3,000 | £1,500 | Normandy Cosmopolitan Hotel, Renfrew |
| 2024 | Gary Robson | 78.92 | 5 – 4 | (England) Kieran Smith | 79.68 | £5,040 | £1,500 | £750 | Normandy Cosmopolitan Hotel, Renfrew |
| 2025 | Christian Perez | 91.13 | 5 – 3 | Ryan Hogarth | 82.16 | £5,040 | £1,500 | £750 | Normandy Cosmopolitan Hotel, Renfrew |
| 2026 | James Beeton | 91.16 | 5 – 3 | Dylan Slevin | 88.24 | £5,400 | £1,500 | £700 | Normandy Cosmopolitan Hotel, Renfrew |

=== Women's ===
| Year | Champion | Av. | Score | Runner-Up | Av. | Prize Money | | | Venue |
| Year | Champion | Av. | Score | Runner-Up | Av. | Total | Ch. | R.-Up | Venue |
|---|---|---|---|---|---|---|---|---|---|
| 1983 | (England) Pat Connaughton | n/a | beat | (England) Kathy Wones | n/a | n/a | n/a | n/a | Ingliston Hall, Edinburgh |
| 1995 | (England) Deta Hedman | n/a | beat | (England) Carole Wright | n/a | n/a | n/a | n/a | Forum, Livingstone |
| 1996 | (Scotland) Anne Kirk | n/a | beat | (Scotland) Janette Youngson | n/a | n/a | n/a | n/a | Forum, Livingstone |
| 1997 | (England) Deta Hedman (2) | n/a | beat | (England) Tricia Wright | n/a | n/a | n/a | n/a | Forum, Livingstone |
| 1998 | (England) Dee Bateman | n/a | beat | (England) Crissy Manley | n/a | n/a | n/a | n/a | Stakis Airport Hotel, Glasgow |
| 1999 | (Scotland) Anne Kirk (2) | n/a | beat | (England) Debra Royal | n/a | n/a | n/a | n/a | Normandy Cosmopolitan Hotel, Renfrew |
| 2000 | (England) Mandy Solomons | n/a | beat | (England) Crissy Manley | n/a | n/a | n/a | n/a | Normandy Cosmopolitan Hotel, Renfrew |
| 2001 | (England) Tricia Wright | n/a | beat | (England) Mandy Solomons | n/a | n/a | n/a | n/a | Normandy Cosmopolitan Hotel, Renfrew |
| 2002 | (Sweden) Carina Ekberg | n/a | beat | (Wales) Chris Savvery | n/a | n/a | n/a | n/a | Normandy Cosmopolitan Hotel, Renfrew |
| 2003 | (Wales) Jan Robbins | n/a | beat | (Scotland) Jackie Sharpe | n/a | n/a | n/a | n/a | Normandy Cosmopolitan Hotel, Renfrew |
| 2004 | (England) Karen Lawman | n/a | 3 – 0 | (England) Dawn Standley | n/a | n/a | n/a | n/a | Normandy Cosmopolitan Hotel, Renfrew |
| 2005 | (England) Dawn Standley | n/a | beat | (England) Karen Littler | n/a | n/a | n/a | n/a | Normandy Cosmopolitan Hotel, Renfrew |
| 2006 | (Russia) Anastasia Dobromyslova | n/a | beat | (Norway) Hege Løkken | n/a | n/a | n/a | n/a | Normandy Cosmopolitan Hotel, Renfrew |
| 2007 | (Netherlands) Karin Krappen | n/a | beat | (England) Sarah Cope | n/a | n/a | n/a | n/a | Normandy Cosmopolitan Hotel, Renfrew |
| 2008 | (Russia) Anastasia Dobromyslova (2) | n/a | beat | (Netherlands) Francis Hoenselaar | n/a | n/a | n/a | n/a | Normandy Cosmopolitan Hotel, Renfrew |
| 2009 | (England) Tricia Wright (2) | n/a | 4 – 0 | (England) Karen Lawman | n/a | n/a | n/a | n/a | Normandy Cosmopolitan Hotel, Renfrew |
| 2010 | (England) Lorraine Winstanley | n/a | 4 – 2 | (England) Stephanie Smee | n/a | n/a | n/a | n/a | Normandy Cosmopolitan Hotel, Renfrew |
| 2011 | (England) Lorraine Winstanley (2) | n/a | 4 – 3 | (Germany) Irina Armstrong | n/a | n/a | n/a | n/a | Normandy Cosmopolitan Hotel, Renfrew |
| 2012 | (England) Deta Hedman (3) | n/a | 4 – 2 | (Wales) Julie Gore | n/a | n/a | n/a | n/a | Normandy Cosmopolitan Hotel, Renfrew |
| 2013 | (England) Deta Hedman (4) | n/a | 4 – 1 | (England) Fallon Sherrock | n/a | n/a | n/a | n/a | Normandy Cosmopolitan Hotel, Renfrew |
| 2014 | (Russia) Anastasia Dobromyslova (3) | n/a | 4 – 0 | (England) Tricia Wright | n/a | n/a | n/a | n/a | Normandy Cosmopolitan Hotel, Renfrew |
| 2015 | (England) Deta Hedman (5) | 77.91 | 5 – 4 | (England) Fallon Sherrock | 71.43 | n/a | n/a | n/a | Normandy Cosmopolitan Hotel, Renfrew |
| 2016 | (England) Lorraine Winstanley (3) | 74.70 | 5 – 3 | (England) Deta Hedman | 70.32 | n/a | n/a | n/a | Normandy Cosmopolitan Hotel, Renfrew |
| 2017 | (England) Fallon Sherrock | n/a | 5 – 4 | (England) Deta Hedman | n/a | n/a | n/a | n/a | Normandy Cosmopolitan Hotel, Renfrew |
| 2018 | (Russia) Anastasia Dobromyslova (4) | n/a | 5 – 4 | (England) Fallon Sherrock | n/a | n/a | n/a | n/a | Normandy Cosmopolitan Hotel, Renfrew |
| 2019 | (England) Lisa Ashton | n/a | 5 – 1 | (England) Fallon Sherrock | n/a | £2,370 | £1,000 | £450 | Normandy Cosmopolitan Hotel, Renfrew |
| 2020 | (England) Beau Greaves | 82.50 | 5 – 2 | (England) Fallon Sherrock | 82.40 | £2,370 | £1,000 | £450 | Normandy Cosmopolitan Hotel, Renfrew |
| 2022 | Deta Hedman (6) | 69.69 | 5 – 4 | Jo Clements | 70.11 | £2,370 | £1,000 | £450 | Normandy Cosmopolitan Hotel, Renfrew |
| 2023 | Deta Hedman (7) | 70.44 | 5 – 4 | Rhian O'Sullivan | 70.75 | £2,370 | £1,000 | £450 | Normandy Cosmopolitan Hotel, Renfrew |
| 2024 | Fallon Sherrock (2) | 75.91 | 5 – 0 | Vicky Pruim | 68.66 | £2,170 | £750 | £350 | Normandy Cosmopolitan Hotel, Renfrew |
| 2025 | Lorraine Hyde | 74.42 | 5 – 4 | Irina Armstrong | 81.09 | £2,170 | £750 | £350 | Normandy Cosmopolitan Hotel, Renfrew |
| 2025 | Rebecca Allen | 67.01 | 5 – 2 | Lorraine Hyde | 69.34 | £2,170 | £750 | £350 | Normandy Cosmopolitan Hotel, Renfrew |

== Tournament records Men ==
- Most wins 2: (England) Robbie Green, (Netherlands) Wesley Harms.
- Most finals 3: (England) Robbie Green, (England) Tony Eccles.
- Most semi-finals 4: (England) Martin Adams, (England) Ronnie Baxter
- Most quarter-finals 4: (England) Gary Robson.
- Most appearances 7: (England) Gary Robson, (England) Martin Adams.
- Most prize money won £6,470: (England) Robbie Green.
- Best winning average (114.00) : (England) Martin Adams v (Scotland) Gary Anderson, 2005 Final.
- Youngest winner age 23: (Australia) Russell Stewart.
- Oldest winner age 56: (England) Gary Robson

== Tournament records Ladies ==
- Most wins 7: (England) Deta Hedman
- Most finals 9: (England) Deta Hedman
- Most Losing finals 5: (England) Fallon Sherrock
- Youngest winner age 17: (England) Beau Greaves
- Oldest winner age 63: (England) Deta Hedman.
