= Robert Thornton (darts player) =

Scottish darts player (born 1967)

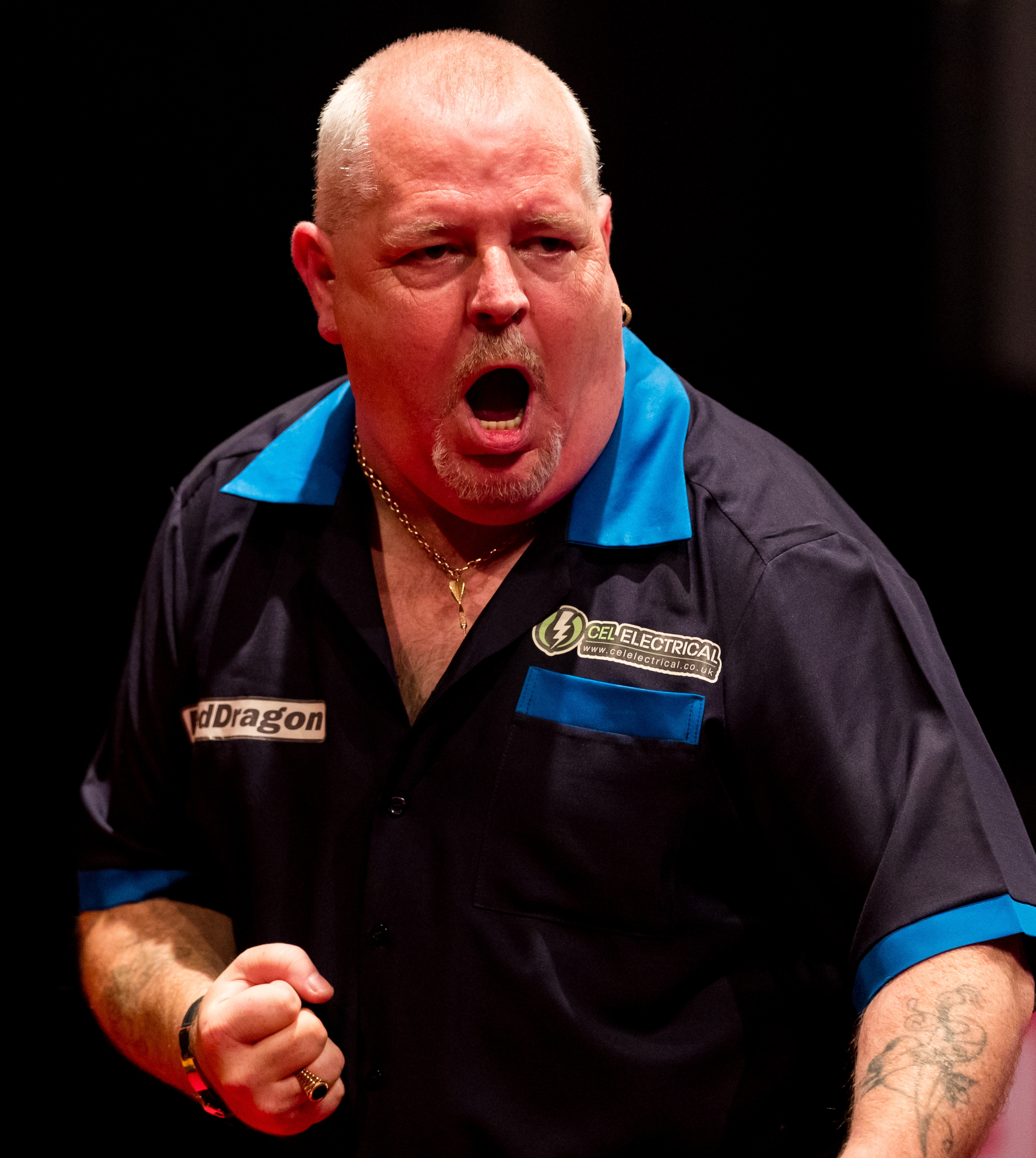
- Thornton in 2019

Personal information
- Nickname: "The Thorn"
- Born: 17 July 1967 (age 59) Irvine, North Ayrshire, Scotland
- Home town: Stevenston, Ayrshire, Scotland

Sport
- Sport: Darts
- Playing since: 1983
- Darts: 26g Red Dragon Signature
- Laterality: Right-handed
- Walk-on music: "I'm Gonna Be (500 Miles)" by The Proclaimers

Organisation (see split in darts)
- BDO: 2004–2008
- PDC: 2008–2025 (Tour Card: 2011–2020)

WDF major events – best performances
- World Championship: Quarter-final: 2005, 2008
- World Masters: Winner (1): 2007
- Dutch Open: Winner (1): 2008

PDC premier events – best performances
- World Championship: Quarter-final: 2015
- World Matchplay: Last 16: 2016
- World Grand Prix: Winner (1): 2015
- UK Open: Winner (1): 2012
- Grand Slam: Runner-up: 2013
- European Championship: Semi-final: 2008
- Premier League: 5th: 2013
- Desert Classic: Last 32: 2008
- US Open/WSoD: Quarter-final: 2009
- PC Finals: Runner-up: 2009
- Masters: Quarter-final: 2013, 2017
- Champions League: Group Stage: 2016

WSDT major events – best performances
- World Championship: Winner (2): 2022, 2023
- World Matchplay: Winner (1): 2022
- World Masters: Runner-up: 2024
- Champions: Quarter-final: 2023, 2024

Other tournament wins
- Years
Central Scotland Open	2007
Portland Open	2009
Revesby Workers Club Open	2010
Scottish Masters	2007
MODUS Online Darts League Phase 5	2021
MODUS Double Trouble Week (2)	2024
British International Championships	2008
European Tour Events
European Darts Open	2015
Players Championships (x8)
2008, 2009, 2012, 2013 (x2), 2014 (x3)
UK Open Qualifiers (x2)
2009, 2013

Robert Thornton (born 17 July 1967) is a Scottish professional darts player who formerly competed in British Darts Organisation (BDO) and Professional Darts Corporation (PDC) events. In the BDO he won the 2007 Winmau World Masters and 2008 Dutch Open. He switched to the PDC in 2008 and won 2 PDC major titles; the UK Open in 2012, and World Grand Prix in 2015. Additionally, Thornton won 11 titles on the PDC Pro Tour.

After losing his PDC Tour Card, Thornton won the World Seniors Darts (WSD) World Championship twice. He also won the 2022 World Seniors Matchplay.

== BDO career ==
Thornton returned to playing darts in 2002, having given up the game for two decades to raise his children. He qualified for the BDO World Championship for the first time in 2005. He beat Martin Atkins and Tony West before losing to Darryl Fitton in the quarter-finals. He then failed to qualify for the 2006 and 2007 events.

Thornton's first professional title came in the Central Scotland Open in April 2007, beating Mike Veitch in the final. He also won the Scottish Masters by defeating Ross Montgomery. He failed to make it through the qualifying event for the 2008 World Championship, but did make it to the televised stages of the 2007 Winmau World Masters in the same weekend. Thornton then beat Co Stompé, BDO world champion Martin Adams, and Atkins to reach the final. He managed to avenge his defeat by Fitton at the 2005 Lakeside World Championship to claim his first major title by 7 sets to 5 and win the £25,000 first prize and also a place in the 2008 World Championship.

His appearance at the World Championship was only his second visit to Lakeside and he matched his previous appearance by reaching the quarter-finals. Having beaten John Walton and Tony O'Shea, he lost to defending champion Adams. Thornton's good form continued into 2008 when he won the Dutch Open in February and reached the last eight of the Scottish Open a week later to achieve a career high of third in the WDF world rankings and was top of the BDO rankings.

== PDC career ==
Thornton qualified for the 2008 UK Open via the Pub qualifiers and then went on to switch to the PDC after withdrawing from the Scottish team for the Europe Cup, stating that his first goal was to get into the top 16 of the PDC Order of Merit which would guarantee his place in all the major tournaments. At the UK Open he lost 9–6 to Alan Tabern in the last 32. Thornton qualified for the Las Vegas Desert Classic losing again in the last 32 this time 6–5 against Adrian Lewis, but went one better at the World Grand Prix when he beat Peter Manley 2–1 in sets in the first round before being defeated 3–2 by Andy Hamilton in the last 16. His good start to his career in the PDC continued at the European Championship where he saw off John Part, Mensur Suljović and Ronnie Baxter to advance to the semi-finals for the first time and a meeting with Phil Taylor. Thornton averaged 102.12 in the match but Taylor averaged 113.33 as he won 11–7. Thornton's World Masters title from last year saw him qualify for the Grand Slam of Darts and he advanced from Group E with wins over Gary Mawson and Kirk Shepherd, before being edged out 10–8 by Terry Jenkins in the last 16. Away from the television cameras on the PDC Pro Tour he won the Australian Open Players Championship with a 3–1 success against Paul Nicholson. He was a losing semi-finalist three times and a quarter-finalist four times in the other events to finish as the highest non-qualified player on the Pro Tour Order of Merit for the 2009 PDC World Championship.

At the World Championship, he won 3–1 against Wayne Jones, but went out in the second round with a 4–3 defeat to world number eight Wayne Mardle. However, this performance guaranteed Thornton a spot in the top 32 of the PDC Order of Merit – just eight months after his defection from the BDO. He reached his first PDC final at the Players Championship Finals. Seeded 14 in the tournament based on the previous year's floor events, Thornton edged Mark Dudbridge in the first round on a final-leg decider. This gave him a second round tie with world number 10 and third seed Alan Tabern, in which Thornton dominated 6–2 after Tabern had missed a dart for a 3–1 lead. He then played a resurgent Dennis Priestley – who had earlier been on the brink of defeat, losing 5–0 to John Part before rattling off six consecutive legs to win the match – in the quarter-finals. Those heroics seemed to fatigue Priestley as he slumped to a 9–5 defeat to Thornton, which earned him a semi-final place against world number two James Wade. In a very tight semi-final, Thornton won four of the last five legs to earn a 13–10 victory and a spot in the final against Phil Taylor, who had only dropped eight legs in the tournament to that point. With the scores level at 5–5 early on, Taylor came out on top 16–9, however Thornton earned £25,000 for making the final, propelling him up the rankings. Thornton became only the third player to win both events of a PDC Pro Tour weekend in Irvine, North Ayrshire, when he beat Dennis Priestley to win both the Scottish Players Championship and the Scottish Regional qualifier for the UK Open. He made his Premier League debut in Aberdeen in an exhibition match against James Wade. Thornton lost 7–2. By this time, Thornton had reached number 19 in the PDC Order of Merit. He lost 9–2 to Adrian Lewis in the third round of the UK Open and 10–4 to Taylor in the first round of the World Matchplay. Thornton saw off Wes Newton 6–4 in the opening round of the European Championship, but lost to Taylor once more as he was whitewashed 9–0, with Thornton's average of 83.24 being almost 30 points lower than his opponents. Thornton topped Group H at the Grand Slam of Darts and then edged past Darin Young in the last 16 10–9, but was knocked out 16–9 in the quarter-finals by Terry Jenkins.

Thornton defeated two qualifiers in Christian Perez and Jyhan Artut at the 2010 World Championship, before Taylor was once again the victor when the two met in the last 16 this time winning by four sets to one.

Thornton was a fixture in the world's top 16 but then broke his hand and later his 2011 season was curtailed significantly after being rushed to hospital complaining of chest pains, breathing problems and headaches. He was diagnosed with pneumonia and did not play again until the 2012 World Championship, where he lost in the second round to Adrian Lewis.

=== First PDC major ===
In June 2012, Thornton won his second major title and first in the PDC, the 2012 UK Open. He came through an extremely tough draw, which included defeats over former world champions, Mark Webster and Dennis Priestley, and world numbers 4 and 5, Gary Anderson and Wes Newton. In the semi-finals he faced rising star Dave Chisnall and with the scores level at 2–2 early on, Thornton produced a devastating run and took the match 10–4 to reach his second major PDC final, where he played fifteen time world champion Phil Taylor. Thornton trailed 0–2 in the final but then won nine of the next ten legs, as his opponent missed 23 darts at a double, and went on to seal an 11–5 victory with a 121 finish. He moved 11 places in the rankings from number 34 to 23 thanks to the win, with the £40,000 prize he won being the highest of his career. In the next major event, the World Matchplay, Thornton was whitewashed 0–10 by Adrian Lewis in the first round. In October, Thornton reached the final of the 13th Players Championship, but lost to Michael van Gerwen 5–6, after leading 4–1. He atoned for this just one day later as he won the 14th event, defeating Gary Anderson 6–5 in an all Scottish final. The next day, Thornton came from behind to beat Mark Walsh 2–1 in sets in the first round of the World Grand Prix. He was then involved in one of the best games in the tournament's history as he again overcame Taylor, this time by 3 sets to 2, hitting eight maximums and taking out 101 and 104 checkouts and surviving six match darts from Taylor. He played Mervyn King in the quarter-finals and lost 0–3 in 31 minutes, winning just four legs during the match. He continued his good form in the Players Championships at the 15th event by reaching another final, this time losing to Peter Wright 1–6. Thornton finished second in Group B of the Grand Slam of Darts to qualify for the last 16, but then lost 8–10 to former champion Scott Waites. After all 33 ProTour events of 2012 had been played, Thornton finished 10th on the Order of Merit to qualify for the Players Championship Finals where compatriot Gary Anderson beat him 10–6 in the second round.

=== 2013 season ===
At the 2013 World Championship Thornton missed four darts to win 4–2 in the second round against Paul Nicholson and another one in the deciding set. Nicholson threw for the match and left 58 after 12 darts, only for Thornton to take out 130. Thornton won the bull to throw first in the sudden-death leg and won it to set up a last 16 meeting with Phil Taylor. However, Thornton could only win three legs as he bowed out of the tournament with a 4–0 defeat. Thornton partnered Gary Anderson for the third time at the World Cup of Darts and they were shocked by Spain 5–4 in the last 16.

Thornton qualified for the Premier League for the first time thanks to his UK Open win last year. He produced some very impressive performances in the first half of the campaign such as in week four when he scored his highest ever televised average of 109.33 during a 7–2 win over Anderson. He also averaged 107.65 in beating Simon Whitlock 7–1 in week eight, and after the ninth week he was in the top four who would qualify for the play-offs at the end of the season. Thornton suffered somewhat of a dip in form after this as he could only win two of his next five games and went into the last week needing to beat the Dutch duo of Raymond van Barneveld and Michael van Gerwen to progress to the play-offs. He lost to van Barneveld 7–4 and, after other results had gone against him, needed an unlikely 7–0 victory over van Gerwen, but instead was beaten 7–1 to end the season in fifth place.

He threw a nine-dart finish in a quarter-final match at the first UK Open Qualifier of the year against Dave Chisnall, but went on to lose 6–4. He won the fourth event in March by beating Jamie Caven 6–4 in the final, having ended Michael van Gerwen's 29 game unbeaten Pro Tour streak start to the year in the semi-finals. Thornton reached the final of the first Players Championship by beating Dean Winstanley in the quarter-finals and Gary Anderson in the semis. He saved his best performance for the final where he beat Ronny Huybrechts 6–0 with an average of 111. In the defence of his UK Open title, Thornton saw off Matthew Edgar and Kirk Shepherd to set up a last 16 meeting with Raymond van Barneveld. Thornton began the match brightly to lead 4–1, but went on to lose 9–7. Thornton produced his first ever victory over van Barneveld in the second round of the European Championship, beating him 10–9, but was defeated in the quarter-finals again in a last leg decider by Ronny Huybrechts. He then suffered his fourth successive first round defeat at the World Matchplay as Ian White beat him 10–3 and also lost in the opening round of the World Grand Prix 2–1 in sets to Paul Nicholson. Thornton bounced back to claim the 11th Players Championship just over a week later with a 6–5 triumph over Jamie Caven. Thornton won two of his three games at the Grand Slam of Darts to finish top of his group on leg difference. He edged past Mervyn King 10–8 in the next round with a 161 checkout in the final leg and then punished 31 missed darts at doubles from Tony O'Shea in a 16–6 win to reach the semi-finals of the event for the first time where he met reigning BDO world champion Scott Waites. Thornton took an early command of the match with a 5–1 lead and withstood a fightback from Waites, who closed the gap to 8–7, to win 16–9. He could never recover from a poor start in the final as he lost each of the first five legs against Phil Taylor and went on to lose 16–6. His form continued into the next week as he reached the final of the 15th Players Championship, losing 6–3 to Dave Chisnall.

=== 2014 season ===
Thornton advanced to the third round of the 2014 World Championship with comfortable victories over Max Hopp and Beau Anderson, but didn't produce his best darts against Wes Newton as he was beaten 4–1. His first final of the year came in February at the fifth UK Open Qualifier where he was defeated 6–2 by Gary Anderson. Thornton was a surprise 9–7 loser to Mensur Suljović in the UK Open fourth round. Thornton beat Phil Taylor 6–4 to play Ian White in the final of the sixth Players Championship. He fell 4–2 and 5–4 down and survived six match darts from White in the next leg to win his eighth PDC title 6–5. He won the next event too by defeating emerging player Keegan Brown 6–5, with his opponent this time missing four match darts. 24 hours later Thornton claimed the eighth event by averaging 106.56 in defeating Terry Jenkins 6–4. He only won two of his 16 Premier League matches to finish eighth in the table. Thornton played in his third World Cup of Darts this year and first with Peter Wright and they progressed to the quarter-finals where they played Northern Ireland's Brendan Dolan and Michael Mansell. Wright lost his singles match to Dolan, but Thornton saw off Mansell 4–3 to send the tie into a deciding doubles game which Scotland lost 4–1. He reached the final of the 11th Players Championship but lost 6–2 to Anderson.

Thornton attended the funeral of his mother in October and on the same day flew to Dublin to compete in the second round of the World Grand Prix against James Wade. The match is considered the best in the tournament's history. At 1–0 ahead in sets, Wade opened the next with the second ever double-start nine-dart finish and threw a 156 finish in the leg after. However, Thornton fought back to win the set and the following one, before incredibly throwing the game's second nine-darter to become the first players to have thrown a perfect leg in the same match in darts history. Thornton would miss four darts to win 3–1, with the tie instead going into a deciding set which Wade took to eliminate Thornton. He was knocked out in the second round of the European Championship by Terry Jenkins and lost all three of his matches at the Grand Slam to finish bottom of his group. Darren Webster missed two match darts in the first round of the Players Championship Finals to allow Thornton to triumph 6–5 and he then fought back from 9–4 down against Jamie Caven to send the game into a deciding leg in which Thornton hit a single one when requiring double top to complete a 120 finish and was beaten 10–9.

=== 2015 season ===
Thornton was the only player to reach the quarter-finals of the 2015 World Championship without dropping a set. In his first appearance in the last eight of the event trailed Michael van Gerwen 3–0 in sets, before winning two unanswered sets. Thornton missed one dart to level the game at 3–3 and was ultimately defeated 5–3. His average of 101.49 was the first time he has been over the 100 mark in a World Championship match. At the second Players Championship, Thorton wired double twelve for a nine darter in a quarter-final defeat to compatriot Peter Wright. He reached the final of the third event, but lost 6–3 to Adrian Lewis. At the European Darts Open, Thornton averaged 111.77 whilst beating James Wade 6–1 in the semi-finals and claimed the first European Tour title of his career by seeing off Kim Huybrechts 6–2 with an average of 106.18 in the final.

At the World Grand Prix, Thornton did not drop a set in the first two rounds in wins over Daryl Gurney and Justin Pipe. Thornton then beat Ian White and Mensur Suljović en route to the final. He faced Michael van Gerwen, who hit eighteen 180's, but Thornton beat him 5–4 in sets to win his second PDC major title and third overall. Thornton also rose to number five in the PDC Order of Merit and secured his entry into the Grand Slam of Darts, where he lost 16–7 in the quarter-finals to Phil Taylor.

=== 2016 season ===
Thornton was eliminated at the first round stage of a World Championship for the first time in his career in 2016, when he could only take three legs off Alan Norris in a 3–0 defeat. He relinquished an 8–0 lead in the first round of the Masters to lose 10–9 against Dave Chisnall. On the opening night of the Premier League, Thornton averaged just 75.68 as Chisnall whitewashed him 7–0. He only won two matches out of 16 games to finish eighth in the table. Thornton was knocked out in the second round of the UK Open 6–4 by Arron Monk. Thornton suffered another heavy loss to Chisnall, this time 11–2 in the second round of the World Matchplay and he was beaten 2–1 in sets by Stephen Bunting in the opening round of the World Grand Prix. He lost in the first round of the European Championship 6–4 to Cristo Reyes and was involved in a nine dart shoot-out at the Grand Slam after Thornton and Dimitri Van den Bergh had both won two of their three games and were locked with a plus one leg difference. Thornton won by 345 points to 340 and then was defeated 10–5 by Michael van Gerwen in the second round. After losing 6–3 to Adrian Lewis in the first round of the Players Championship Finals, it meant Thornton had not progressed past the second round of any major event in 2016.

=== 2017 season ===
In the second round of the 2017 World Championship, Thornton lost the first six legs against Daryl Gurney but recovered to move 3–2 up. He then lost six of the final seven legs to be edged out 4–3. He played in his first final since the 2015 World Grand Prix at the ninth Players Championship and was defeated 6–2 by Michael van Gerwen.

== World Championship results ==
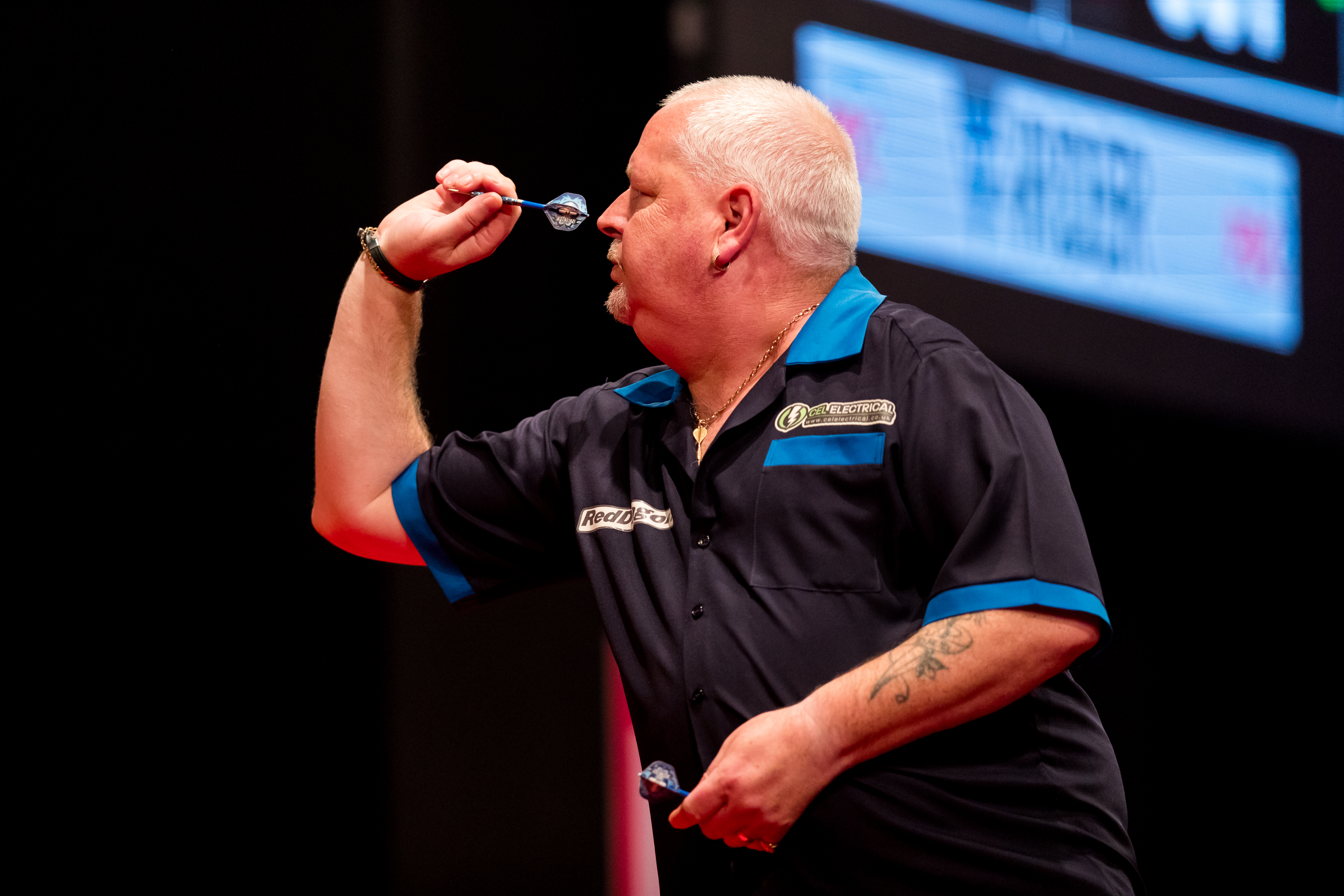
Thornton during the 2019 European Darts Matchplay

=== BDO ===
- 2005: Quarter-finals (lost to Darryl Fitton 0–5)
- 2008: Quarter-finals (lost to Martin Adams 4–5)

=== PDC ===
- 2009: Second round (lost to Wayne Mardle 3–4)
- 2010: Third round (lost to Phil Taylor 1–4)
- 2011: Third round (lost to Adrian Lewis 1–4)
- 2012: Second round (lost to Adrian Lewis 2–4)
- 2013: Third round (lost to Phil Taylor 0–4)
- 2014: Third round (lost to Wes Newton 1–4)
- 2015: Quarter-finals (lost to Michael van Gerwen 2–5)
- 2016: First round (lost to Alan Norris 0–3)
- 2017: Second round (lost to Daryl Gurney 3–4)
- 2018: Second round (lost to Mensur Suljović 2–4)
- 2019: First round (lost to Daniel Larsson 1–3)

=== WSDT ===
- 2022: Winner (beat Martin Adams 5–1)
- 2023: Winner (beat Richie Howson 5–2)
- 2024: Second round (lost to Andy Hamilton 2–3)
- 2025: Quarter-finals (lost to Ross Montgomery 1–3)

== Career finals ==
=== BDO major finals: 1 (1 title) ===
Outcome	No.	Year	Championship	Opponent in the final	Score (Note: (l) = score in legs, (s) = score in sets.)	Ref.
Winner	1.	2007	World Masters	(England) Darryl Fitton	7–5 (s)	

=== PDC major finals: 4 (2 titles) ===
Legend
Grand Slam (0–1)
UK Open (1–0)
World Grand Prix (1–0)
Players Championship Finals (0–1)

Outcome	No.	Year	Championship	Opponent in the final	Score	Ref.
Runner-up	1.	2009	Players Championship Finals	Phil Taylor	9–16 (l)	
Winner	1.	2012	UK Open	Phil Taylor	11–5 (l)	
Runner-up	2.	2013	Grand Slam	Phil Taylor	6–16 (l)	
Winner	2.	2015	World Grand Prix	Michael van Gerwen	5–4 (s)	

=== Seniors major finals: 3 (3 titles) ===
Outcome	No.	Year	Championship	Opponent	Score
Winner	1.	2022	World Seniors Darts Championship	(England) Martin Adams	5–1 (s)
Winner	2.	2022	World Seniors Darts Matchplay	(England) Phil Taylor	12–10 (l)
Winner	3.	2023	World Seniors Darts Championship (2)	(England) Richie Howson	5–2 (s)

== Career statistics ==
Performance Table Legend
W	Won the tournament	F	Finalist	SF	Semifinalist	QF	Quarterfinalist	#R; RR; Prel.	Lost in # round Round-robin; Preliminary round	DQ	Disqualified
DNQ	Did not qualify	DNP	Did not participate	WD	Withdrew	NH	Tournament not held	#R; RR; Prel.	Lost in # round Round-robin; Preliminary round	NYF	Not yet founded

=== Performance timeline ===
BDO

Tournament	2005	2007	2008
BDO Ranked televised events
BDO World Championship	QF	DNQ	QF
World Masters	3R	W	PDC

PDC

Tournament	2008	2009	2010	2011	2012	2013	2014	2015	2016	2017	2018	2019	2020
PDC Ranked televised events
PDC World Championship	BDO	2R	3R	3R	2R	3R	3R	QF	1R	2R	2R	1R	DNQ
UK Open	4R	3R	4R	QF	W	5R	4R	4R	2R	3R	3R	3R	3R
World Matchplay	DNQ	1R	1R	DNQ	1R	1R	1R	1R	2R	1R	DNQ		
World Grand Prix	2R	1R	DNQ		QF	1R	2R	W	1R	QF	DNQ		
European Championship	SF	2R	2R	DNQ		QF	2R	1R	1R	DNQ			
Grand Slam of Darts	2R	QF	2R	DNQ	2R	F	RR	QF	2R	DNQ		2R	DNQ
Players Championship Finals	NH	F	1R	DNQ	2R	2R	2R	1R	1R	2R	1R	DNQ	
PDC Non-ranked televised events
Premier League Darts	DNP					5th	8th	DNP	8th	DNP			
Masters	Not held					QF	1R	1R	1R	QF	DNQ		
PDC World Cup of Darts	NH		QF	NH	DNQ	2R	QF	DNQ	QF	DNQ			2R
World Series of Darts Finals	Not held							2R	1R	DNQ			
PDC Past major events
Las Vegas Desert Classic	BDO			1R	DNQ	Not held							
Champions League of Darts	Not held								RR	DNQ			NH
Career statistics
Year-end ranking	NR	16	21	31	17	9	9	6	9	28	33	55	73

WSD

Tournament	2022	2023	2024	2025
WSD Televised events
World Seniors Darts Championship	W	W	2R	QF
World Seniors Champion of Champions	NH	QF	QF	DNP
World Seniors Masters	1R	SF	F	NH
World Seniors Matchplay	W	1R	SF	NH

PDC European Tour

Season	1	2	3	4	5	6	7	8	9	10	11	12	13
2012	ADO; DNQ	GDC; DNQ	EDO; 3R	GDM; QF	DDM; DNP								
2013	UKM; QF	EDT; 2R	EDO; 3R	ADO; 3R	GDT; 2R	GDC; 2R	GDM; 3R	DDM; DNP					
2014	GDC; 3R	DDM; DNP	GDM; 2R	ADO; 3R	GDT; 3R	EDO; 2R	EDG; QF	EDT; DNQ					
2015	GDC; QF	GDT; 2R	GDM; QF	DDM; DNP	IDO; 3R	EDO; W	EDT; 3R	EDM; SF	EDG; 3R				
2016	DDM; DNP	GDM; 2R	GDT; 3R	EDM; 2R	ADO; 2R	EDO; 2R	IDO; 3R	EDT; 3R	EDG; DNP	GDC; DNP			
2017	GDC; DNQ	GDM; 2R	GDO; 1R	EDG; DNQ	GDT; DNQ	EDM; DNQ	ADO; DNQ	EDO; DNQ	DDM; DNQ	GDG; DNQ	IDO; DNQ	EDT; 1R	
2018	EDO; DNQ	GDG; DNQ	GDO; 1R	ADO; DNQ	EDG; DNQ	DDM; DNQ	GDT; 1R	DDO; 1R	EDM; 3R	GDC; 3R	DDC; 1R	IDO; 1R	EDT; DNQ
2019	EDO; DNQ	GDC; 1R	GDG; DNQ	GDO; DNQ	ADO; DNQ	EDG; DNQ	DDM; DNQ	DDO; DNQ	CDO; 1R	ADC; DNQ	EDM; 1R	IDO; DNQ	GDT; 1R

PDC Players Championships

Season	1	2	3	4	5	6	7	8	9	10	11	12	13	14	15	16	17	18	19	20	21	22	23	24	25	26	27	28	29	30	31	32	33	34	35	36	37
2008	Did not participate										BRI; 1R	BRI; 2R	LVE; 1R	BLA; 2R	NSW; W	KIT; SF	ATL; 3R	EIN; 2R	EIN; SF	DRO; DNP	CHI; DNP	NEW; 2R	NEW; 3R	DUB; 4R	DUB; 3R	IRV; 4R	IRV; SF	KIR; QF	KIL; DNP	LEI; 4R	LEI; 3R						
2009	DON; SF	GIB; QF	GIB; SF	GLA; 2R	GLA; QF	IRV; W	WIG; 4R	BRE; 4R	COV; 3R	NUL; QF	NUL; 2R	TAU; QF	DER; 3R	NEW; 4R	BAR; 3R	BAR; QF	DIN; 3R	DIN; 2R	LVE; 4R	SYD; F	ONT; 3R	ATL; 2R	ATL; QF	SAL; 2R	SAL; 3R	DUB; 2R	DUB; 2R	KIL; DNP	NUL; 4R	NUL; QF	IRV; 3R	IRV; 2R					
2010	GIB; 3R	GIB; 4R	SWI; 2R	DER; 4R	GLA; 3R	GLA; QF	WIG; QF	CRA; 2R	BAR; 1R	DER; 2R	WIG; 3R	WIG; 1R	SAL; 1R	SAL; 3R	BAR; 3R	BAR; 3R	HAA; 1R	HAA; 2R	LVE; 2R	LVE; 3R	LVE; 3R	SYD; 4R	ONT; 3R	ONT; 3R	CRA; 3R	CRA; 4R	NUL; DNP		DUB; 4R	DUB; 4R	KIL; DNP	BAD; DNP		BAR; 4R	BAR; 2R	DER; 1R	DER; QF
2011	HAL; DNP		DER; 2R	DER; 1R	CRA; 1R	CRA; 4R	VIE; 4R	VIE; 4R	CRA; 2R	CRA; 1R	BAR; QF	BAR; 2R	NUL; 1R	NUL; 2R	ONT; 3R	ONT; 1R	DER; 2R	DER; 1R	NUL; DNP		DUB; DNP		KIL; 3R	GLA; DNP		ALI; 2R	ALI; 1R	CRA; 3R	CRA; 4R	WIG; 2R	WIG; 2R						
2012	ALI; DNP		REA; 2R	REA; 2R	CRA; 4R	CRA; 3R	BIR; 4R	BIR; SF	CRA; 4R	CRA; 1R	BAR; 2R	BAR; 4R	DUB; F	DUB; W	KIL; F	KIL; 1R	CRA; 4R	CRA; QF	BAR; SF	BAR; SF																	
2013	WIG; W	WIG; 3R	WIG; SF	WIG; QF	CRA; 3R	CRA; SF	BAR; 1R	BAR; 1R	DUB; 3R	DUB; QF	KIL; W	KIL; 4R	WIG; DNP		BAR; F	BAR; 1R																					
2014	BAR; 1R	BAR; 2R	CRA; 3R	CRA; 1R	WIG; 3R	WIG; W	WIG; W	WIG; W	CRA; 4R	CRA; 4R	COV; F	COV; 3R	CRA; 1R	CRA; 4R	DUB; DNP		CRA; QF	CRA; 4R	COV; 4R	COV; 3R																	
2015	BAR; 3R	BAR; QF	BAR; F	BAR; 4R	BAR; QF	COV; 1R	COV; 3R	COV; 3R	CRA; 2R	CRA; 1R	BAR; 2R	BAR; 1R	WIG; 3R	WIG; 2R	BAR; 4R	BAR; 3R	DUB; 2R	DUB; 2R	COV; 2R	COV; 1R																	
2016	BAR; 1R	BAR; 3R	BAR; 1R	BAR; 2R	BAR; 2R	BAR; 3R	BAR; 4R	COV; 3R	COV; 1R	BAR; 2R	BAR; 1R	BAR; 1R	BAR; 2R	BAR; 2R	BAR; QF	BAR; 1R	DUB; 2R	DUB; 3R	BAR; 3R	BAR; 3R																	
2017	BAR; 2R	BAR; 1R	BAR; 2R	BAR; 1R	MIL; 2R	MIL; 2R	BAR; 3R	BAR; 4R	WIG; F	WIG; 3R	MIL; 1R	MIL; 3R	WIG; QF	WIG; SF	BAR; 4R	BAR; 4R	BAR; 2R	BAR; 1R	DUB; 4R	DUB; 4R	BAR; 1R	BAR; 2R															
2018	BAR; 1R	BAR; 4R	BAR; 1R	BAR; 2R	MIL; 1R	MIL; 3R	BAR; 4R	BAR; 4R	WIG; 2R	WIG; 2R	MIL; DNP		WIG; 2R	WIG; 1R	BAR; 2R	BAR; 2R	BAR; 1R	BAR; 3R	DUB; 1R	DUB; QF	BAR; 1R	BAR; 2R															
2019	WIG; 1R	WIG; 4R	WIG; 2R	WIG; 3R	BAR; 2R	BAR; 1R	WIG; 1R	WIG; 1R	BAR; 1R	BAR; 2R	BAR; 1R	BAR; 1R	BAR; 3R	BAR; 1R	BAR; 1R	BAR; SF	WIG; 1R	WIG; 2R	BAR; 1R	BAR; 2R	HIL; 1R	HIL; 1R	BAR; 1R	BAR; 1R	BAR; 3R	BAR; 1R	DUB; 2R	DUB; 2R	BAR; 1R	BAR; 1R							
2020	BAR; 2R	BAR; 1R	WIG; 1R	WIG; 2R	WIG; DNP	WIG; 1R	BAR; 2R	BAR; 1R	MIL; 1R	MIL; 1R	MIL; 1R	MIL; 4R	MIL; 3R	NIE; 2R	NIE; 3R	NIE; 1R	NIE; 1R	NIE; 1R	COV; 1R	COV; 2R	COV; 2R	COV; 2R	COV; 1R														
2021 (Note: Not a Tour card holder)	BAR; DNP				MIL; DNP				NIE; 3R	NIE; 3R	NIE; QF	NIE; SF	MIL; DNP		MIL; 1R	MIL; 2R	COV; DNP	COV; 1R	COV; 1R	COV; 3R	BAR; DNP					BAR; 2R	BAR; 1R	BAR; DNP		BAR; 2R							

PDC Challenge Tour

Season	1	2	3	4	5	6	7	8	9	10	11	12	13	14	15	16	17	18	19	20	21	22	23	24	Prize money	Ranking
2021; UK	MIL; L256	MIL; L256	MIL; L64	MIL; SF	MIL; L32	MIL; L256	MIL; QF	MIL; L128	MIL; L256	MIL; L64	MIL; L32	MIL; L64													£1150	31st
2022	MIL; L64	MIL; L32	MIL; L64	MIL; L64	MIL; L64	HIL; Did not participate										LEI; SF	LEI; F	LEI; L128	LEI; L32	LEI; DNP	LEI; L16	LEI; L32	LEI; L32	LEI; L16	£2450	25th
2024	MIL; L256	MIL; L256	MIL; L256	MIL; L256	MIL; L128	HIL; Did not participate					LEI; L256	LEI; QF	LEI; DNP			MIL; L64	MIL; L64	MIL; L256	MIL; L128	MIL; L256	LEI; DNP				£650	138th
2025	MIL; DNP		MIL; L512	MIL; L256	Did not participate																				£0	NC

Performance Table Legend
W	Won the tournament	F	Finalist	SF	Semifinalist	QF	Quarterfinalist	#R; RR; Prel.	Lost in # round Round-robin; Preliminary round	DQ	Disqualified
DNQ	Did not qualify	DNP	Did not participate	WD	Withdrew	NH	Tournament not held	#R; RR; Prel.	Lost in # round Round-robin; Preliminary round	NYF	Not yet founded

== Nine-dart finishes ==
Robert Thornton televised nine-dart finishes
Date	Opponent	Tournament	Method	Prize
8 October 2014	(England) James Wade	World Grand Prix	D20, 2 x T20; 3 x T20; T20, T17, bullseye	£2,500
