= 2022 World Seniors Darts Championship =

2022 JENNINGSbet World Seniors Darts Championship

Tournament information
- Dates: 3–6 February 2022
- Venue: Circus Tavern
- Location: Purfleet, England
- Organisation(s): World Seniors Darts Tour
- Format: Sets
- Prize fund: £72,500
- Winner's share: £30,000
- High checkout: 170 Kevin Painter

Champion(s)
- Robert Thornton

The 2022 World Seniors Darts Championship (known for sponsorship reasons as the 2022 JENNINGSbet World Seniors Darts Championship) was the first World Seniors Darts Championship organised by the World Seniors Darts Tour and was held at the Circus Tavern in Purfleet between 3 and 6 February 2022.

The event was open to players over the age of 50, and was a joint venture between MODUS Sports and Jason Francis, which organised Snooker Legends and World Seniors Championship of Snooker in 2017–18.

Target Darts were announced as one of the leading sponsors for the 2022 World Seniors Darts Championship. The World Seniors Darts Championship was broadcast in United Kingdom, Germany, Ireland, Austria and Switzerland.

Robert Thornton became the inaugural champion, defeating Martin Adams 5–1 in the final.

== Prize money ==
The prize fund for the event was £72,500, with £30,000 going to the champion.

Position (no. of players)		Prize money (Total: £72,500)
Winner	(1)	£30,000
Runner-up	(1)	£12,500
Semi-finalists	(2)	£4,000
Quarter-finalists	(4)	£2,000
First round	(8)	£1,000
Preliminary round	(8)	£750

== Qualifiers ==
The first player announced to take part in the event on 3 April 2021 was 16-time world champion Phil Taylor.

The 24-player field comprised 11 former PDC and BDO World Champions, plus a further 11 invited players. Two further places were completed by a qualifying event which took place 13–14 November 2021 at The Crucible Club in Reading. Current PDC Tour Card holders were ineligible, ruling out world champions Richie Burnett, Peter Wright, Gary Anderson, Raymond van Barneveld, Steve Beaton, Glen Durrant and Scott Mitchell.

Tony David was invited to the tournament but withdrew due to visa reasons and was replaced by Alan Warriner-Little. Dennis Priestley was also invited to the tournament but he suffered a leg injury. Andy Fordham had also accepted an invite to participate, but he died in July 2021 and was replaced by Deta Hedman. Ted Hankey withdrew in December 2021 and was replaced by Larry Butler. Richie Burnett and Kevin Burness then had to withdraw in January 2022 upon winning PDC Tour Cards. Lisa Ashton (who had subsequently lost hers), and Dave Prins (as the highest ranked non-qualified player from the qualifiers) replaced them.

Invited Seeds
Starting in second round

- (England) Martin Adams (runner-up)
- (England) Lisa Ashton (second round)
- (England) Keith Deller (second round)
- (England) Trina Gulliver (second round)
- (England) John Lowe (second round)
- (Canada) John Part (second round)
- (England) Phil Taylor (quarter-finals)
- (Wales) Wayne Warren (second round)

Invited players
Starting in first round

- (England) Bob Anderson (first round)
- ~~(Wales) Richie Burnett~~
- (United States) Larry Butler (quarter-finals)
- ~~(Australia) Tony David~~
- (England) Darryl Fitton (first round)
- ~~(England) Ted Hankey~~
- (England) Deta Hedman (first round)
- ~~(Scotland) Jamie Harvey~~
- (England) Terry Jenkins (semi-finals)
- (Singapore) Paul Lim (first round)
- ~~(England) Cliff Lazarenko~~
- (England) Peter Manley (second round)
- (England) Tony O'Shea (first round)
- (England) Kevin Painter (semi-finals)
- ~~(England) Dennis Priestley~~
- (Netherlands) Roland Scholten (first round)
- (Scotland) Robert Thornton (champion)
- (Scotland) Les Wallace (first round)
- (England) John Walton (quarter-finals)
- (England) Alan Warriner-Little (first round)
- ~~(England) Dave Whitcombe~~

Qualifiers
Starting in first round

- ~~(Northern Ireland) Kevin Burness~~
- (England) Richie Howson (second round)
- (England) Dave Prins (quarter-finals)

== Draw ==
The draw for the tournament was announced on 18 January 2022.

First round (best of 5 sets); 3–4 February
Peter Manley 76.16	3
Deta Hedman 71.49	1
Tony O'Shea 84.40	2
Kevin Painter 85.27	3
Robert Thornton 94.66	3
Bob Anderson 80.91	0
Paul Lim 84.95	1
Q	Dave Prins 90.15	3
Les Wallace 74.32	2
John Walton 76.39	3
Terry Jenkins 84.32	3
Roland Scholten 76.19	0
Alan Warriner-Little 56.81	0
Larry Butler 88.99	3
Darryl Fitton 76.69	2
Q	Richie Howson 83.07	3

Second round (best of 5 sets); 4–5 February
S	Phil Taylor 81.29	3
Peter Manley 74.43	1
S	Wayne Warren 75.52	0
Kevin Painter 94.59	3
S	Trina Gulliver 74.19	0
Robert Thornton 92.63	3
S	John Lowe 71.77	0
Q	Dave Prins 90.79	3
S	John Part 74.68	1
John Walton 77.15	3
S	Lisa Ashton 80.66	1
Terry Jenkins 86.58	3
S	Keith Deller 74.33	2
Larry Butler 78.74	3
S	Martin Adams 91.46	3
Q	Richie Howson 87.45	2

Quarter-finals (best of 5 sets); 5 February
S	Phil Taylor 86.10	0
Kevin Painter 88.88	3
Robert Thornton 91.17	3
Q	Dave Prins 77.27	0
John Walton 75.44	1
Terry Jenkins 77.02	3
Larry Butler 83.49	1
S	Martin Adams 84.83	3

Semi-finals (best of 7 sets); 6 February
Kevin Painter 84.15	2
Robert Thornton 87.31	4
Terry Jenkins 86.32	2
S	Martin Adams 88.97	4

Final (best of 9 sets); 6 February
Robert Thornton 92.66	5
S	Martin Adams 89.06	1

== Statistics ==
=== Top averages ===
This table shows the highest averages achieved by players throughout the tournament.

#	Player	Round	Average	Result
1	(Scotland) Robert Thornton	R1	94.66	Won
2	(England) Kevin Painter	R2	94.59	Won
3	(Scotland) Robert Thornton	F	92.66	Won
4	(Scotland) Robert Thornton	R2	92.63	Won
5	(England) Martin Adams	R2	91.46	Won
6	(Scotland) Robert Thornton	QF	91.17	Won
7	(England) Dave Prins	R2	90.79	Won
8	(England) Dave Prins	R1	90.15	Won
9	(England) Martin Adams	F	89.06	Lost
10	(United States) Larry Butler	R1	88.99	Won

== Representation ==
This table shows the number of players by country in the 2022 World Seniors Darts Championship. A total of seven nationalities were represented.

	(England) ENG	(Scotland) SCO	(United States) USA	(Canada) CAN	(Wales) WAL	(Netherlands) NED	(Singapore) SGP	Total
Final	1	1	0	0	0	0	0	2
Semi-finals	3	1	0	0	0	0	0	4
Quarter-finals	6	1	1	0	0	0	0	8
Second round	12	1	1	1	1	0	0	16
First round	11	2	1	0	0	1	1	16
Total	17	2	1	1	1	1	1	24

== Broadcasting rights ==
BT Sport won the rights to air the championship, and their coverage was Ray Stubbs and Bobby George, with Helen Chamberlain conducting interviews, while commentary duties were covered by Mark Webster, Paul Nicholson, John Gwynne, and Chris Murphy. BBC aired the event via the BBC iPlayer & BBC Sport website and app. In Ireland, Virgin Media Three broadcast the whole tournament with Sport1 covering the tournament in Germany.
