= 2017 Scottish Open darts =

The 2017 Scottish Open was the 45th edition of the Scottish Open. Cameron Menzies won the men's tournament whilst Fallon Sherrock won the women's. Menzies was the first Scottish player to win the open since 2007, when Gary Anderson won. All four semi-finalists in the men's tournament were below 50th in the BDO darts rankings. In the women's tournament it was Sherrock's first victory since the Finder Masters 2015.

== Prize money ==
- Winner £3,000 (men), £1,000 (women)
- Runner-up £1,500 (men), £450 (women)
- Semi-finalist £480 (men), £160 (women)
- Quarter-finalist £200 (men), £70 (women)
- Last 16 £80 (men), £40 (women)
- Last 32 £40 (men)

== Last 32 - Men's Draw ==
1st Round
(England) Roger Brown	4
(Scotland) Craig Tweddell	1
(England) Gary Stafford	4
(Scotland) William Plank	0
(Scotland) James Mitchell	4
(Scotland) Ross Montgomery	2
(Netherlands) Wesley Harms	4
(Scotland) Dean Lawrie	1
(England) Scott Baker	4
(England) Derek Lumley	2
(England) Daniel Day	4
(Wales) Nick Kenny	3
(England) Brian Dawson	4
(Netherlands) Willem Mandigers	2
(Scotland) Robert Morrison	4
(England) Sean Jowers	2
(England) Martin Atkins	4
(England) Kevin Leadenham	1
(England) Ryan Joyce	4
(England) Steve Robertson	1
(Republic of Ireland) Neil Duff	4
(Scotland) Steve Buchan	1
(Scotland) Cameron Menzies	4
(Northern Ireland) Kyle McKinstry	3
(Lithuania) Darius Labanauskas	4
(Scotland) Harry Todman	1
(Wales) Richie Edwards	4
(England) Martin Adams	0
(Wales) Wayne Warren	4
(Netherlands) Richard Veenstra	2
(England) Garry Thompson	4
(England) David Turnbull	3

2nd Round
(England) Gary Stafford	4
(England) Roger Brown	0
(Netherlands) Wesley Harms	4
(Scotland) James Mitchell	3
(England) Daniel Day	4
(England) Scott Baker	2
(Scotland) Robert Morrison	4
(England) Brian Dawson	0
(England) Martin Atkins	4
(England) Ryan Joyce	2
(Scotland) Cameron Menzies	4
(Republic of Ireland) Neil Duff	0
(Wales) Richie Edwards	4
(Lithuania) Darius Labanauskas	3
(Wales) Wayne Warren	4
(England) Garry Thompson	0

Quarterfinals
(England) Gary Stafford	5
(Netherlands) Wesley Harms	1
(England) Daniel Day	5
(Scotland) Robert Morrison	4
(Scotland) Cameron Menzies	5
(England) Martin Atkins	4
(Wales) Wayne Warren	5
(Wales) Richie Edwards	3

Semifinals
(England) Daniel Day	5
(England) Gary Stafford	3
(Scotland) Cameron Menzies	5
(Wales) Wayne Warren	2

Finals
1	(Scotland) Cameron Menzies	6
(England) Daniel Day	4

== Women's Draw ==
First round
(England) Deta Hedman	4
(England) Sarah Roberts	0
(England) Laura Turner	4
(England) Paula Jacklin	3
(Netherlands) Sharon Prins	4
(England) Heather Lodge	0
(England) Lorraine Winstanley	4
(England) Tricia Wright	3
(Netherlands) Aileen de Graaf	4
(England) Heather Draper	0
(England) Fallon Sherrock	4
(England) Margaret Sutton	0
(Scotland) Susanna McGimpsey	4
(Scotland) Amanda Cox	2
(England) Lisa Ashton	4
(Netherlands) Danielle Ijpelaar	0

Quarter-finals
(England) Deta Hedman	4
(England) Laura Turner	2
(England) Lorraine Winstanley	4
(Netherlands) Sharon Prins	2
(England) Fallon Sherrock	4
(Netherlands) Aileen de Graaf	2
(England) Lisa Ashton	4
(Scotland) Susanna McGimpsey	0

Semi-finals
(England) Deta Hedman	4
(England) Lorraine Winstanley	1
(England) Fallon Sherrock	4
(England) Lisa Ashton	2

Final
(England) Fallon Sherrock	5
(England) Deta Hedman	4
