= 2008 Dutch Open (darts) =

The 2008 Dutch Open was the 36th edition of the Dutch Open. Scott Waites was the defending champion, but lost to Edwin Max 3–2 in legs in the last 16. Robert Thornton won the tournament, defeating Alain van Bouwel 3–0 in sets.

== Draw ==
=== Preliminary round ===
- (Netherlands) Paul Hoogenboom 2–3 Edwin Max (Netherlands)
- (Belgium) Alain van Bouwel 3–0 David Fatum (United States)

=== Last 32 ===
Round 2
(Netherlands)	Anton Veldhuizen	2
(Scotland)	Robert Thornton	3
(Netherlands)	Bert Koster	2
(Netherlands)	Dennis Koenen	3
(Netherlands)	Joey ten Berge	3
(Netherlands)	Fons Hardeman	1
(England)	Clive Barden	3
(Netherlands)	Co Stompé	2
(Netherlands)	Fernand van der Velde	3
(Netherlands)	Reinier Schouten	2
(Belgium)	Patrick Bulen	3
(England)	Gary Robson	1
(England)	Paul Hogan	1
(Norway)	Robert Wagner	3
(Netherlands)	Wilbert van Koerten	2
(England)	Martin Adams	3
(England)	Kevin Simm	2
(England)	Scott Waites	3
(Netherlands)	Bauke de Boer	2
(Netherlands)	Edwin Max	3
(England)	Martin Atkins	3
(Netherlands)	Remco van Eijden	1
(Belgium)	Alain van Bouwel	3
(Netherlands)	Mark Wensink	2
(Finland)	Sami Sanssi	2
(Netherlands)	Willem Kralt	3
(Netherlands)	Wouter Bos	1
(Netherlands)	Willy van de Wiel	3
(England)	Phil Nixon	3
(England)	Darryl Fitton	1
(Netherlands)	Rene Kuiken	2
(Belgium)	Geert De Vos	3

Round 3
(Scotland)	Robert Thornton	3
(Netherlands)	Dennis Koenen	1
(Netherlands)	Joey ten Berge	3
(England)	Clive Barden	1
(Netherlands)	Fernand van der Velde	0
(Belgium)	Patrick Bulen	3
(Norway)	Robert Wagner	3
(England)	Martin Adams	1
(England)	Scott Waites	2
(Netherlands)	Edwin Max	3
(England)	Martin Atkins	2
(Belgium)	Alain van Bouwel	3
(Netherlands)	Willem Kralt	3
(Netherlands)	Willy van de Wiel	0
(England)	Phil Nixon	3
(Belgium)	Geert De Vos	1

Quarter-finals
(Scotland)	Robert Thornton (84.99)	4
(Netherlands)	Joey ten Berge (88.14)	1
(Belgium)	Patrick Bulen (78.63)	0
(Norway)	Robert Wagner (100.20)	4
(Netherlands)	Edwin Max (74.82)	1
(Belgium)	Alain van Bouwel (79.53)	4
(Netherlands)	Willem Kralt (71.19)	4
(England)	Phil Nixon (75.84)	3

Semi-finals
(Scotland)	Robert Thornton (102.51)	2
(Norway)	Robert Wagner (97.59)	0
(Belgium)	Alain van Bouwel (80.79)	2
(Netherlands)	Willem Kralt (76.80)	0

Final
(Scotland)	Robert Thornton (92.52)	3
(Belgium)	Alain van Bouwel (84.24)	0
