= 2013 World Matchplay =

2013 BetVictor World Matchplay

Tournament information
- Dates: 20–28 July 2013
- Venue: Winter Gardens
- Location: Blackpool, England
- Organisation(s): Professional Darts Corporation (PDC)
- Format: Legs
- Prize fund: £400,000
- Winner's share: £100,000
- High checkout: 170; Justin Pipe; Brendan Dolan; Andy Hamilton

Champion(s)
- Phil Taylor (ENG)

The 2013 BetVictor World Matchplay was the 20th annual staging of the darts tournament, the World Matchplay, organised by the Professional Darts Corporation. The tournament took place from 20 to 28 July 2013 at the Winter Gardens, Blackpool.

Phil Taylor was the defending champion, having won the last five stagings of the event, and he won his sixth consecutive World Matchplay title and 14th in total by defeating Adrian Lewis 18–13 in the final. His average of 111.23 in the final is the highest ever in a World Matchplay final.

For the first time since the 2009 Las Vegas Desert Classic, the top four players in the world all reached the semi-final stage.

== Prize money ==
For the fifth consecutive World Matchplay, the prize fund was £400,000.

Position (no. of players)		Prize money (Total: £400,000)
Winner	(1)	£100,000
Runner-Up	(1)	£50,000
Semi-finalists	(2)	£25,000
Quarter-finalists	(4)	£15,000
Second round	(8)	£7,500
First round	(16)	£5,000

== Format ==
In the previous stagings of the event all games had to be won by two clear legs with no sudden-death legs. However, this year, after consulting the host broadcaster Sky Sports, the PDC decided that games will now only proceed for a maximum of six extra legs before a tie-break leg is required. For example, in a best of 19 legs first round match, if the score reaches 12–12 then the 25th leg will be the decider.

== Qualification ==
The top 16 in the PDC Order of Merit qualified as seeded players. The other 16 places went to the top 16 non-qualified players from the PDC ProTour Order of Merit who are unseeded players.

=== PDC Top 16 ===
1. (England) Phil Taylor (winner)
2. (Netherlands) Michael van Gerwen (semi-finals)
3. (England) Adrian Lewis (runner-up)
4. (England) James Wade (semi-finals)
5. (Australia) Simon Whitlock (quarter-finals)
6. (England) Andy Hamilton (quarter-finals)
7. (England) Wes Newton (first round)
8. (Netherlands) Raymond van Barneveld (second round)
9. (England) Justin Pipe (quarter-finals)
10. (England) Dave Chisnall (quarter-finals)
11. (Scotland) Robert Thornton (first round)
12. (England) Kevin Painter (second round)
13. (England) Mervyn King (first round)
14. (Northern Ireland) Brendan Dolan (second round)
15. (Belgium) Kim Huybrechts (first round)
16. (England) Terry Jenkins (second round)

=== PDC ProTour qualifiers ===
1. (England) Jamie Caven (second round)
2. (Scotland) Peter Wright (second round)
3. (Canada) John Part (first round)
4. (England) Stuart Kellett (first round)
5. (Australia) Paul Nicholson (first round)
6. (Scotland) Gary Anderson (second round)
7. (England) Ronnie Baxter (first round)
8. (England) Colin Lloyd (first round)
9. (England) Steve Beaton (first round)
10. (England) Andy Smith (first round)
11. (England) Ian White (second round)
12. (Netherlands) Jelle Klaasen (first round)
13. (Wales) Jamie Lewis (first round)
14. (Belgium) Ronny Huybrechts (first round)
15. (Austria) Mensur Suljović (first round)
16. (Wales) Mark Webster (first round)

== Draw ==
First round (best of 19 legs); 20–22 July
1	(England) Phil Taylor 103.18	10
(England) Stuart Kellett 75.82	1
16	(England) Terry Jenkins 95.93	10
(England) Andy Smith 84.90	3
8	(Netherlands) Raymond van Barneveld 99.84	10
(Austria) Mensur Suljović 89.56	4
9	(England) Justin Pipe 99.24	10
(Wales) Mark Webster 86.39	4
5	(Australia) Simon Whitlock 95.79	10
(Netherlands) Jelle Klaasen 87.30	8
12	(England) Kevin Painter 91.90	10
(Wales) Jamie Lewis 88.14	7
4	(England) James Wade 97.33	10
(Canada) John Part 88.28	8
13	(England) Mervyn King 87.56	5
(Scotland) Gary Anderson 97.36	10
2	(Netherlands) Michael van Gerwen 99.83	10
(England) Colin Lloyd 93.92	7
15	(Belgium) Kim Huybrechts 91.59	4
(Scotland) Peter Wright 96.06	10
7	(England) Wes Newton 97.35	8
(England) Jamie Caven 90.99	10
10	(England) Dave Chisnall 89.95	10
(Australia) Paul Nicholson 84.71	8
6	(England) Andy Hamilton 97.12	10
(England) Ronnie Baxter 88.87	1
11	(Scotland) Robert Thornton 92.59	3
(England) Ian White 93.38	10
3	(England) Adrian Lewis 86.94	10
(Belgium) Ronny Huybrechts 85.03	5
14	(Northern Ireland) Brendan Dolan 89.38	10
(England) Steve Beaton 87.04	8

Second round (best of 25 legs); 23–24 July
1	(England) Phil Taylor 102.64	14
16	(England) Terry Jenkins 96.04	12
8	(Netherlands) Raymond van Barneveld 89.55	9
9	(England) Justin Pipe 91.88	13
5	(Australia) Simon Whitlock 93.82	13
12	(England) Kevin Painter 91.22	10
4	(England) James Wade 96.25	13
(Scotland) Gary Anderson 93.73	9
2	(Netherlands) Michael van Gerwen 105.58	13
(Scotland) Peter Wright 94.74	3
(England) Jamie Caven 93.29	10
10	(England) Dave Chisnall 99.22	13
6	(England) Andy Hamilton 96.13	13
(England) Ian White 92.32	7
3	(England) Adrian Lewis 96.52	13
14	(Northern Ireland) Brendan Dolan 94.42	5

Quarter-finals (best of 31 legs); 25–26 July
1	(England) Phil Taylor 104.38	16
9	(England) Justin Pipe 97.46	10
5	(Australia) Simon Whitlock 99.41	16
4	(England) James Wade 98.86	18
2	(Netherlands) Michael van Gerwen 102.29	16
10	(England) Dave Chisnall 99.21	11
6	(England) Andy Hamilton 95.91	17
3	(England) Adrian Lewis 95.95	19

Semi-finals (best of 33 legs); 27 July
1	(England) Phil Taylor 107.61	17
4	(England) James Wade 98.58	12
2	(Netherlands) Michael van Gerwen 100.54	15
3	(England) Adrian Lewis 102.28	17

Final (best of 35 legs); 28 July
1	(England) Phil Taylor 111.23	18
3	(England) Adrian Lewis 105.92	13

== Statistics ==
Player	Eliminated	Played	Legs Won	Legs Lost	LWAT	100+	140+	180s	High checkout	3-dart average
(England) Phil Taylor	Winner	5	75	48	26	181	92	31	161	105.81
(England) Adrian Lewis	Final	5	72	60	25	152	92	56	161	97.52
(Netherlands) Michael van Gerwen	Semi-finals	4	54	38	18	96	78	26	164	102.06
(England) James Wade	Semi-finals	4	53	50	21	122	82	24	146	97.76
(England) Andy Hamilton	Quarter-finals	3	40	27	14	81	41	17	170	96.39
(Australia) Simon Whitlock	Quarter-finals	3	39	36	16	90	57	19	130	96.34
(England) Justin Pipe	Quarter-finals	3	33	29	12	88	31	23	170	96.19
(England) Dave Chisnall	Quarter-finals	3	34	34	12	87	51	21	144	96.13
(England) Terry Jenkins	Second round	2	22	17	9	37	35	16	118	95.99
(Scotland) Gary Anderson	Second round	2	19	18	10	51	25	4	121	95.55
(Scotland) Peter Wright	Second round	2	13	17	4	45	19	6	96	95.40
(Netherlands) Raymond van Barneveld	Second round	2	19	17	8	49	26	7	121	94.70
(England) Ian White	Second round	2	17	16	5	34	25	7	125	92.85
(England) Jamie Caven	Second round	2	20	21	7	44	24	10	109	92.14
(Northern Ireland) Brendan Dolan	Second round	2	15	21	8	51	28	5	170	91.90
(England) Kevin Painter	Second round	2	20	20	7	51	20	10	164	91.56
(England) Wes Newton	First round	1	8	10	2	23	12	6	87	97.35
(England) Colin Lloyd	First round	1	7	10	2	22	12	3	120	93.92
(Scotland) Robert Thornton	First round	1	3	10	1	20	8	3	60	92.59
(Belgium) Kim Huybrechts	First round	1	4	10	1	14	9	1	62	91.59
(Austria) Mensur Suljović	First round	1	4	10	2	22	5	1	120	89.56
(England) Ronnie Baxter	First round	1	1	10	0	17	3	0	76	88.87
(Canada) John Part	First round	1	8	10	2	16	7	4	104	88.28
(Wales) Jamie Lewis	First round	1	7	10	2	20	5	4	104	88.14
(England) Mervyn King	First round	1	5	10	2	20	8	1	61	87.56
(Netherlands) Jelle Klaasen	First round	1	8	10	4	17	12	3	158	87.30
(England) Steve Beaton	First round	1	8	10	5	29	8	0	118	87.04
(Wales) Mark Webster	First round	1	4	10	1	17	4	3	101	86.39
(Belgium) Ronny Huybrechts	First round	1	5	10	2	14	10	2	80	85.03
(England) Andy Smith	First round	1	3	10	2	21	7	0	116	84.90
(Australia) Paul Nicholson	First round	1	8	10	3	27	9	1	80	84.71
(England) Stuart Kellett	First round	1	1	10	0	7	3	2	18	75.82

Source: Match reports from the draw.
