= 2013 Premier League Darts =

Darts competition

2013 McCoy's Premier League Darts

Tournament information
- Dates: 7 February–16 May 2013

Champion(s)
- Michael van Gerwen (NED)

The 2013 McCoy's Premier League Darts was a darts tournament organised by the Professional Darts Corporation; the ninth edition of the tournament. The event began at the Odyssey Arena in Belfast on 7 February, and ended at The O_{2} Arena, London on 16 May. The tournament was shown live on Sky Sports in the UK and Ireland.

Phil Taylor was the defending champion and he reached the final again this year, but lost 10–8 against Michael van Gerwen who won his first Premier League title on his debut appearance in the competition.

== Qualification ==
The qualification format was different from the last edition of Premier League Darts. The top four players from the PDC Order of Merit after the 2013 PDC World Darts Championship automatically qualified. Alongside them, six (instead of four) additional players were chosen on the basis of their performance in the past year or in earlier editions of the Premier League. After the first nine rounds, the bottom 2 players were relegated. All players played each other once at that point. The remaining eight then competed against each other in the final five rounds for the play-offs places. All games in the league stage were played "best of 12 legs" (instead of "best of 14 legs"), thus games could be drawn by 6–6.

Player	Appearance in Premier League	Consecutive Streak	Order of Merit rank	Previous best performance	Qualification
(England) Phil Taylor	9th	9	1	Winner (2005–2008, 2010, 2012)	1st in the PDC Order of Merit
(England) Adrian Lewis	6th	4	2	Runner-up (2011)	2nd in the PDC Order of Merit
(England) James Wade	6th	6	3	Winner (2009)	3rd in the PDC Order of Merit
(Netherlands) Michael van Gerwen	1st	1	4	Debut	4th in the PDC Order of Merit
(Netherlands) Raymond van Barneveld	8th	8	8	Semi-finalist (2006–09, 2011)	Five-time World Champion/2012 Grand Slam of Darts Winner
(Australia) Simon Whitlock	4th	4	5	Runner-up (2012)	2012 European Championship Winner
(Scotland) Gary Anderson	3rd	3	11	Winner (2011)	2011 Premier League Darts Champion
(England) Andy Hamilton	2nd	2	6	Semi-finalist (2012)	2012 Premier League Darts Semi-finalist
(England) Wes Newton	1st	1	7	Debut	2012 European Championship Finalist
(Scotland) Robert Thornton	1st	1	15	Debut	2012 UK Open Champion

== Venues ==
The venues remained the same as in the last Premier League Darts edition.

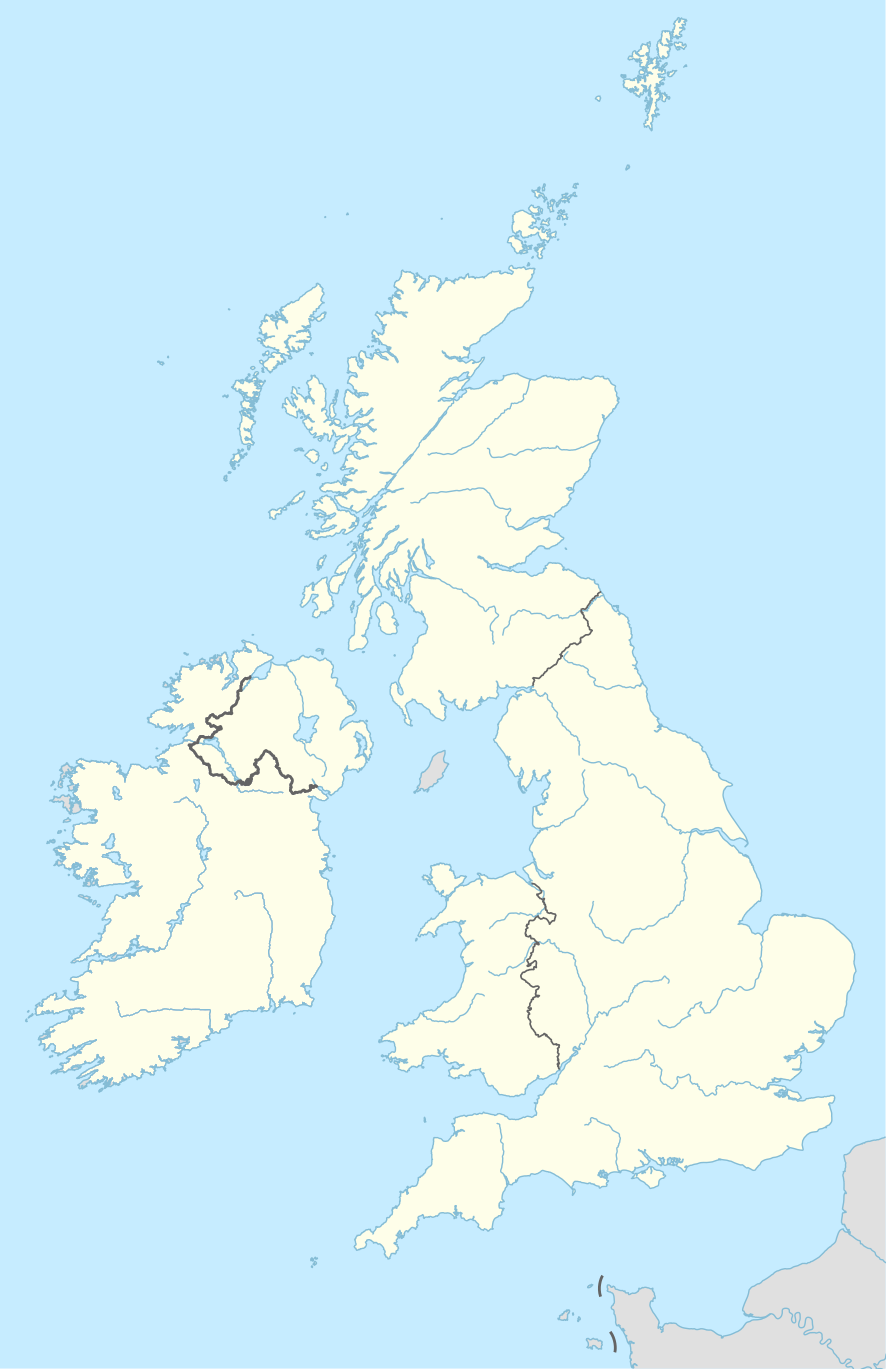
Locations of the 2013 Premier League venues in the United Kingdom.

(Northern Ireland) Belfast	(Scotland) Aberdeen	(England) Bournemouth	(England) Exeter	(England) Nottingham
Odyssey Arena; Thursday 7 February	AECC; Thursday 14 February	Bournemouth International Centre; Thursday 21 February	Westpoint Arena; Thursday 28 February	Capital FM Arena; Thursday 7 March
(England) Manchester	(Wales) Cardiff	(Scotland) Glasgow	(England) Brighton	(England) Sheffield
Manchester Arena; Thursday 14 March	Motorpoint Arena; Thursday 21 March	SECC; Thursday 28 March	Brighton Centre; Thursday 4 April	Motorpoint Arena; Thursday 11 April
(Republic of Ireland) Dublin	(England) Birmingham	(England) Liverpool	(England) Newcastle upon Tyne	(England) London
The O_{2} Thursday 18 April	National Indoor Arena; Thursday 25 April	Echo Arena; Thursday 2 May	Metro Radio Arena; Thursday 9 May	The O_{2} Arena; Thursday 16 May

== Prize money ==
The prize-money was increased to £520,000 from £450,000 in 2012.

Stage	Prize money
Winner	£150,000
Runner-up	£75,000
Semi-finallists (x2)	£55,000
5th place	£45,000
6th place	£40,000
7th place	£35,000
8th place	£30,000
9th place	£20,000
10th place	£15,000
Total	£520,000

== Results ==
=== League stage ===
==== 7 February – week 1 (Phase 1) ====
(Northern Ireland) Odyssey Arena, Belfast

	Score	
Andy Hamilton (England); 93.42	5 – 7	(Scotland) Robert Thornton; 98.84
James Wade (England); 87.32	7 – 4	(England) Wes Newton; 86.59
Raymond van Barneveld (Netherlands); 102.02	7 – 4	(Scotland) Gary Anderson; 93.77
Simon Whitlock (Australia); 88.89	7 – 3	(England) Adrian Lewis; 91.20
Phil Taylor (England); 97.05	6–6	(Netherlands) Michael van Gerwen; 97.93
Nights Average: 93.7
Highest Checkout: Simon Whitlock 121

==== 14 February – week 2 (Phase 1) ====
(Scotland) AECC, Aberdeen

	Score	
Wes Newton (England); 94.06	2 – 7	(Netherlands) Raymond van Barneveld; 100.19
Andy Hamilton (England); 96.07	7 – 4	(England) James Wade; 91.54
Gary Anderson (Scotland); 96.05	7 – 5	(Australia) Simon Whitlock; 88.62
Adrian Lewis (England); 89.41	3 – 7	(England) Phil Taylor; 98.69
Robert Thornton (Scotland); 97.51	6–6	(Netherlands) Michael van Gerwen; 98.28
Nights Average: 95.04
Highest Checkout: Andy Hamilton 120

==== 21 February – week 3 (Phase 1) ====
(England) Bournemouth International Centre, Bournemouth

	Score	
James Wade (England); 100.59	7 – 4	(England) Adrian Lewis; 91.50
Robert Thornton (Scotland); 92.88	6–6	(England) Wes Newton; 92.42
Simon Whitlock (Australia); 101.80	2 – 7	(England) Phil Taylor; 107.33
Michael van Gerwen (Netherlands); 104.21	7 – 3	(Netherlands) Raymond van Barneveld; 96.02
Andy Hamilton (England); 99.26	7 – 5	(Scotland) Gary Anderson; 92.07
Nights Average: 97.81
Highest Checkout: Andy Hamilton 152

==== 28 February – Week 4 (Phase 1) ====
(England) Westpoint Arena, Exeter

	Score	
Robert Thornton (Scotland); 109.33	7 – 2	(Scotland) Gary Anderson; 93.82
Andy Hamilton (England); 93.63	2 – 7	(Netherlands) Michael van Gerwen; 95.88
James Wade (England); 101.81	6–6	(England) Phil Taylor; 102.51
Wes Newton (England); 85.66	7 – 3	(England) Adrian Lewis; 84.18
Raymond van Barneveld (Netherlands); 99.47	7 – 3	(Australia) Simon Whitlock; 96.44
Nights Average: 96.27
Highest Checkout: Gary Anderson 124

==== 7 March – Week 5 (Phase 1) ====
(England) Capital FM Arena, Nottingham

	Score	
James Wade (England); 105.73	7 – 1	(Scotland) Robert Thornton; 98.91
Raymond van Barneveld (Netherlands); 102.24	7 – 5	(England) Andy Hamilton; 100.16
Adrian Lewis (England); 97.70	7 – 4	(Netherlands) Michael van Gerwen; 93.25
Phil Taylor (England); 97.66	5 – 7	(Scotland) Gary Anderson; 95.76
Wes Newton (England); 97.54	5 – 7	(Australia) Simon Whitlock; 99.14
Nights Average: 98.81
Highest Checkout: James Wade & Raymond van Barneveld 121

==== 14 March – Week 6 (Phase 1) ====
(England) MEN Arena, Manchester

	Score	
Michael van Gerwen (Netherlands); 101.52	7 – 4	(England) Wes Newton; 98.14
Adrian Lewis (England); 91.89	6–6	(Scotland) Gary Anderson; 95.86
Simon Whitlock (Australia); 97.80	7 – 4	(England) James Wade; 97.49
Raymond van Barneveld (Netherlands); 95.08	6–6	(Scotland) Robert Thornton; 98.78
Phil Taylor (England); 93.81	3 – 7	(England) Andy Hamilton; 101.40
Nights Average: 97.18
Highest Checkout: James Wade 170

==== 21 March – Week 7 (Phase 1) ====
(Wales) Cardiff International Arena, Cardiff

	Score	
Andy Hamilton (England); 91.34	7 – 4	(Australia) Simon Whitlock; 91.68
Gary Anderson (Scotland); 96.82	1 – 7	(Netherlands) Michael van Gerwen; 107.22
Robert Thornton (Scotland); 94.40	5 – 7	(England) Adrian Lewis; 95.51
Wes Newton (England); 93.07	2 – 7	(England) Phil Taylor; 101.72
James Wade (England); 96.17	6–6	(Netherlands) Raymond van Barneveld; 95.84
Nights Average: 96.38
Highest Checkout: Michael van Gerwen 164

==== 28 March – Week 8 (Phase 1) ====
(Scotland) SECC, Glasgow

	Score	
Adrian Lewis (England); 88.70	7 – 4	(England) Andy Hamilton; 87.85
Simon Whitlock (Australia); 90.77	1 – 7	(Scotland) Robert Thornton; 107.65
Phil Taylor (England); 102.94	7 – 3	(Netherlands) Raymond van Barneveld; 102.96
Gary Anderson (Scotland); 95.31	5 – 7	(England) Wes Newton; 87.53
Michael van Gerwen (Netherlands); 104.43	4 – 7	(England) James Wade; 98.51
Nights Average: 96.67
Highest Checkout: Robert Thornton 157

==== 4 April – Week 9 (Phase 1) ====
(England) Brighton Centre, Brighton

	Score	
Adrian Lewis (England); 100.25	2 – 7	(Netherlands) Raymond van Barneveld; 100.59
Phil Taylor (England); 97.35	4 – 7	(Scotland) Robert Thornton; 103.15
Wes Newton (England); 89.82	5 – 7	(England) Andy Hamilton; 91.27
Gary Anderson (Scotland); 100.64	3 – 7	(England) James Wade; 98.59
Michael van Gerwen (Netherlands); 102.78	7 – 3	(Australia) Simon Whitlock; 88.01
Nights Average: 97.25
Highest Checkout: Simon Whitlock 130

==== 11 April – week 10 (Phase 2) ====
(England) Motorpoint Arena, Sheffield

	Score	
Robert Thornton (Scotland); 97.67	4 – 7	(Australia) Simon Whitlock; 95.76
Adrian Lewis (England); 87.83	2 – 7	(England) James Wade; 103.91
Michael van Gerwen (Netherlands); 103.90	7 – 3	(England) Phil Taylor; 99.65
Andy Hamilton (England); 95.66	5 – 7	(Netherlands) Raymond van Barneveld; 94.65
James Wade (England); 90.81	5 – 7	(Netherlands) Michael van Gerwen; 90.99
Nights Average: 96.08
Highest Checkout: Andy Hamilton 124

==== 18 April – week 11 (Phase 2) ====
(Republic of Ireland) The O_{2}, Dublin

	Score	
Andy Hamilton (England); 95.44	3 – 7	(England) Phil Taylor; 105.43
Raymond van Barneveld (Netherlands); 99.72	4 – 7	(Netherlands) Michael van Gerwen; 106.82
Robert Thornton (Scotland); 91.11	4 – 7	(England) James Wade; 95.38
Simon Whitlock (Australia); 95.41	7 – 3	(England) Andy Hamilton; 89.86
Raymond van Barneveld (Netherlands); 95.83	6–6	(England) Phil Taylor; 94.60
Michael van Gerwen (Netherlands); 90.74	7 – 5	(England) Adrian Lewis; 89.15
Nights Average: 95.79
Highest Checkout: Michael van Gerwen 158

==== 25 April – week 12 (Phase 2) ====
(England) National Indoor Arena, Birmingham

	Score	
Phil Taylor (England); 105.24	7 – 2	(England) Adrian Lewis; 92.53
Simon Whitlock (Australia); 99.54	7 – 5	(Netherlands) Michael van Gerwen; 101.09
Robert Thornton (Scotland); 91.22	7 – 4	(England) Andy Hamilton; 87.31
Raymond van Barneveld (Netherlands); 104.20	7 – 2	(England) James Wade; 97.00
Phil Taylor (England); 103.35	7 – 4	(Australia) Simon Whitlock; 100.63
Adrian Lewis (England); 86.92	5 – 7	(Scotland) Robert Thornton; 92.67
Nights Average: 96.81
Highest Checkout: Robert Thornton 152

==== 2 May – week 13 (Phase 2) ====
(England) Echo Arena, Liverpool

	Score	
Michael van Gerwen (Netherlands); 97.11	7 – 4	(England) Andy Hamilton; 95.49
James Wade (England); 93.32	4 – 7	(Australia) Simon Whitlock; 98.26
Robert Thornton (Scotland); 98.88	2 – 7	(England) Phil Taylor; 100.92
Raymond van Barneveld (Netherlands); 102.06	7 – 4	(England) Adrian Lewis; 98.13
James Wade (England); 98.90	2 – 7	(England) Andy Hamilton; 100.90
Nights Average: 98.4
Highest Checkout: Phil Taylor 164

==== 9 May – week 14 (Phase 2) ====
(England) Metro Radio Arena, Newcastle upon Tyne

	Score	
Andy Hamilton (England); 97.27	5 – 7	(England) Adrian Lewis; 100.88
Robert Thornton (Scotland); 97.51	4 – 7	(Netherlands) Raymond van Barneveld; 99.55
Adrian Lewis (England); 96.40	6–6	(Australia) Simon Whitlock; 94.22
Phil Taylor (England); 97.73	6–6	(England) James Wade; 99.82
Michael van Gerwen (Netherlands); 105.35	7 – 1	(Scotland) Robert Thornton; 100.75
Simon Whitlock (Australia); 93.13	4 – 7	(Netherlands) Raymond van Barneveld; 92.60
Nights Average: 97.52
Highest Checkout: Adrian Lewis 170

=== Play-offs – 16 May ===
(England) The O_{2} Arena, London

	Score	
Semi-finals (best of 15 legs)
Raymond van Barneveld (Netherlands); 102.08	4 – 8	(England) Phil Taylor; 104.68
Michael van Gerwen (Netherlands); 97.59	8 – 4	(England) James Wade; 93.59
Final (best of 19 legs)
Phil Taylor (England); 104.10	8 – 10	(Netherlands) Michael van Gerwen; 103.29
Nights Average: 100.89
Highest Checkout: Phil Taylor 164

== Table and streaks ==
=== Table ===
#	Name	Pld	W	D	L	Pts	LF	LA	+/-	LWAT	100+	140+	180s	A	HC	C%
1	(Netherlands) Michael van Gerwen W	16	11	2	3	24	102	68	+34	40	185	156	57	100.09	164	38.65%
2	(Netherlands) Raymond van Barneveld	16	10	3	3	23	98	74	+24	41	215	142	68	98.88	161	60.72%
3	(England) Phil Taylor RU	16	8	4	4	20	95	73	+22	40	249	113	30	100.37	164	41.14%
4	(England) James Wade	16	7	3	6	17	88	82	+6	30	233	101	58	97.12	170	61.43%
5	(Scotland) Robert Thornton	16	6	3	7	15	81	88	−7	32	216	128	53	98.2	161	40.78%
6	(Australia) Simon Whitlock	16	7	1	8	15	81	90	−9	33	215	106	44	95.01	140	40.30%
7	(England) Andy Hamilton	16	6	0	10	12	82	93	−11	29	180	115	42	94.77	152	38.48%
8	(England) Adrian Lewis	16	4	2	10	10	73	100	−27	25	185	112	43	92.57	170	33.14%
9	(England) Wes Newton	9	2	1	6	5	42	56	−14	15	109	58	26	91.65	132	36.52%
10	(Scotland) Gary Anderson	9	2	1	6	5	40	58	−18	20	125	72	28	95.57	124	27.97%

Last updated: 19 April 2013
Source: Match reports from the results section.

Bottom two eliminated after Week 9. Top four qualified for the Play-offs after Week 14.
NB: LWAT = Legs Won Against Throw. A = Average C% = Checkout Percentage HC = High Checkout. Players separated by +/- leg difference if tied. If leg difference is equal the table is sorted by the player's LWAT. If it is still tied, ranking is determined by average.

=== Streaks ===
Player	1st Phase									2nd Phase										Play-offs	
Player	1	2	3	4	5	6	7	8	9	10		11		12		13		14		SF	F
(Netherlands) Michael van Gerwen	D	D	W	W	L	W	W	L	W	W	W	W	W	L		W		W		W	W
(Netherlands) Raymond van Barneveld	W	W	L	W	W	D	D	L	W	W		L	D	W		W		W	W	L	—N/a
(England) Phil Taylor	D	W	W	D	L	L	W	W	L	L		W	D	W	W	W		D		W	L
(England) James Wade	W	L	W	D	W	L	D	W	W	W	L	W		L		L	L	D		L	—N/a
(Scotland) Robert Thornton	W	D	D	W	L	D	L	W	W	L		L		W	W	L		L	L	Eliminated	
(Australia) Simon Whitlock	W	L	L	L	W	W	L	L	L	W		W		W	L	W		D	L	Eliminated	
(England) Andy Hamilton	L	W	W	L	L	W	W	L	W	L		L	L	L		L	W	L		Eliminated	
(England) Adrian Lewis	L	L	L	L	W	D	W	W	L	L		L		L	L	L		W	D	Eliminated	
(England) Wes Newton	L	L	D	W	L	L	L	W	L	Eliminated											
(Scotland) Gary Anderson	L	W	L	L	W	D	L	L	L	Eliminated											

Legend:	W	Win	D	Draw	L	Loss	—N/a	Eliminated

=== Positions by round ===
Player	Round													
Player	1	2	3	4	5	6	7	8	9	10	11	12	13	14
(Netherlands) Michael van Gerwen	5	6	2	2	4	2	1	1	1	1	1	1	1	1
(Netherlands) Raymond van Barneveld	2	1	3	3	1	1	2	4	3	3	3	3	3	2
(England) Phil Taylor	6	2	1	1	3	5	3	2	5	5	4	2	2	3
(England) James Wade	3	7	5	5	2	3	4	3	2	2	2	4	4	4
(Scotland) Robert Thornton	4	3	6	4	5	4	6	5	4	4	5	5	5	5
(Australia) Simon Whitlock	1	4	7	8	7	7	7	8	8	7	6	6	6	6
(England) Andy Hamilton	7	5	4	6	6	6	5	6	6	6	7	7	7	7
(England) Adrian Lewis	10	10	10	10	10	10	8	7	7	8	8	8	8	8
(England) Wes Newton	8	9	9	7	9	9	10	9	9	Eliminated				
(Scotland) Gary Anderson	9	8	8	9	8	8	9	10	10	Eliminated				
