= 2015 World Grand Prix (darts) =

Darts

2015 PartyPoker.com World Grand Prix

Tournament information
- Dates: 4–10 October 2015
- Venue: Citywest Hotel
- Location: Dublin, Ireland
- Organisation(s): Professional Darts Corporation (PDC)
- Format: Sets "double in, double out"
- Prize fund: £400,000
- Winner's share: £100,000
- High checkout: 170 Mensur Suljović

Champion(s)
- Robert Thornton (SCO)

The 2015 PartyPoker.com World Grand Prix was the eighteenth staging of the World Grand Prix. It was played from 4 to 10 October 2015 at the Citywest Hotel in Dublin, Ireland.

Michael van Gerwen was the defending champion, after beating James Wade 5–3 in sets in the previous year's final, but he was beaten 5–4 in the final by Robert Thornton.

== Prize money ==
The total prize money remained at £400,000. The following is the breakdown of the fund:

Position (num. of players)		Prize money (Total: £400,000)
Winner	(1)	£100,000
Runner-Up	(1)	£45,000
Semi-finalists	(2)	£23,500
Quarter-finalists	(4)	£15,000
Second round losers	(8)	£8,500
First round losers	(16)	£5,000

== Qualification ==
The field of 32 players is made up from the top 16 on the PDC Order of Merit on September 14. The remaining 16 places went to the top 14 non-qualified players from the ProTour Order of Merit and then to the top two non-qualified residents of the Republic of Ireland and Northern Ireland from the 2015 ProTour Order of Merit. The top eight players are seeded in the tournament.

PDC Top 16
1. (Netherlands) Michael van Gerwen (runner-up)
2. (Scotland) Gary Anderson (second round)
3. (England) Phil Taylor (first round)
4. (Scotland) Peter Wright (first round)
5. (England) Adrian Lewis (second round)
6. (England) James Wade (first round)
7. (Scotland) Robert Thornton (winner)
8. (England) Michael Smith (second round)
9. (England) Dave Chisnall (second round)
10. (England) Ian White (quarter-finals)
11. (Australia) Simon Whitlock (second round)
12. (Northern Ireland) Brendan Dolan (first round)
13. (England) Terry Jenkins (second round)
14. (England) Mervyn King (first round)
15. (Belgium) Kim Huybrechts (second round)
16. (Netherlands) Raymond van Barneveld (first round)

PDPA Players Championship qualifiers
1. (Netherlands) Jelle Klaasen (quarter-finals)
2. (England) Justin Pipe (second round)
3. (Netherlands) Vincent van der Voort (quarter-finals)
4. (Netherlands) Benito van de Pas (first round)
5. (Austria) Mensur Suljović (semi-finals)
6. (England) Stephen Bunting (first round)
7. (Wales) Gerwyn Price (first round)
8. (England) Steve Beaton (first round)
9. (Scotland) John Henderson (first round)
10. (England) Andrew Gilding (first round)
11. (Wales) Mark Webster (semi-finals)
12. (England) Keegan Brown (first round)
13. (England) Jamie Caven (first round)
14. (Wales) Jamie Lewis (quarter-finals)

Irish qualifiers
1. (Northern Ireland) Daryl Gurney (first round)
2. (Republic of Ireland) William O'Connor (first round)

== Draw ==
The draw was made on 27 September 2015.

First round (best of 3 sets); 4–5 October
1	(Netherlands) Michael van Gerwen 92.84	2
(England) Keegan Brown 77.32	1
(Belgium) Kim Huybrechts 82.08	2
(Netherlands) Benito van de Pas 78.37	1
8	(England) Michael Smith 84.11	2
(Wales) Gerwyn Price 74.85	1
(Wales) Jamie Lewis 87.75	2
(Republic of Ireland) William O'Connor 87.39	1
5	(England) Adrian Lewis 91.13	2
(Netherlands) Raymond van Barneveld 77.14	0
(England) Stephen Bunting 83.01	1
(Wales) Mark Webster 87.88	2
4	(Scotland) Peter Wright 88.77	1
(England) Dave Chisnall 89.11	2
(Northern Ireland) Brendan Dolan 79.81	1
(Netherlands) Jelle Klaasen 82.26	2
2	(Scotland) Gary Anderson 97.89	2
(Scotland) John Henderson 86.07	0
(England) Ian White 89.20	2
(England) Jamie Caven 80.50	0
7	(Scotland) Robert Thornton 96.98	2
(Northern Ireland) Daryl Gurney 89.76	0
(England) Justin Pipe 84.97	2
(England) Steve Beaton 75.35	1
6	(England) James Wade 94.41	1
(Austria) Mensur Suljović 93.23	2
(Australia) Simon Whitlock 85.65	2
(England) Andrew Gilding 79.92	0
3	(England) Phil Taylor 97.03	0
(Netherlands) Vincent van der Voort 90.14	2
(England) Terry Jenkins 86.01	2
(England) Mervyn King 84.40	1

Second round (best of 5 sets); 6–7 October
1	(Netherlands) Michael van Gerwen 91.87	3
(Belgium) Kim Huybrechts 92.48	1
8	(England) Michael Smith 86.14	2
(Wales) Jamie Lewis 83.64	3
5	(England) Adrian Lewis 78.85	0
(Wales) Mark Webster 91.41	3
(England) Dave Chisnall 88.53	2
(Netherlands) Jelle Klaasen 91.43	3
2	(Scotland) Gary Anderson 97.20	1
(England) Ian White 97.96	3
7	(Scotland) Robert Thornton 83.96	3
(England) Justin Pipe 80.10	0
(Austria) Mensur Suljović 91.34	3
(Australia) Simon Whitlock 88.19	0
(Netherlands) Vincent van der Voort 86.23	3
(England) Terry Jenkins 76.19	0

Quarter-finals (best of 5 sets); 8 October
1	(Netherlands) Michael van Gerwen 95.66	3
(Wales) Jamie Lewis 79.36	0
(Wales) Mark Webster 85.67	3
(Netherlands) Jelle Klaasen 88.67	2
(England) Ian White 79.83	2
7	(Scotland) Robert Thornton 90.06	3
(Austria) Mensur Suljović 85.09	3
(Netherlands) Vincent van der Voort 81.60	1

Semi-finals (best of 7 sets); 9 October
1	(Netherlands) Michael van Gerwen 93.25	4
(Wales) Mark Webster 83.24	1
7	(Scotland) Robert Thornton 90.03	4
(Austria) Mensur Suljović 86.49	2

Final (best of 9 sets); 10 October
1	(Netherlands) Michael van Gerwen 96.79	4
7	(Scotland) Robert Thornton 90.79	5
