= Dennis Harbour =

English darts player

Personal information
- Nickname: The Harbour Master
- Born: 28 June 1961 (age 65) Peterborough, England

Sport
- Sport: Darts
- Playing since: 1979
- Darts: 20 gram Unicorn
- Laterality: Right-handed

Organisation (see split in darts)
- BDO: 1985–2003, 2005–2020
- PDC: 2003–2004
- WDF: 1985–2003, 2005–

WDF major events – best performances
- World Championship: Quarter Final: 2016
- World Masters: Last 32: 1989, 1994, 2014, 2015

PDC premier events – best performances
- UK Open: Last 32: 2004

WSDT major events – best performances
- World Championship: Last 16: 2023

Other tournament wins
- Years
Cambridgeshire Open	2014
Isle of Man Open	2015
Latvia Open	2014
Scottish Open	2015

Dennis Harbour (born 28 June 1961) is an English former darts player. His nickname was The Harbour Master.

== Career ==
Harbour played in the 1989 Winmau World Masters and lost in the first round to Dave Whitcombe. He returned to the Masters in 1994, again losing in the first round to Mike Gregory. After many years in the circuit, Harbour finally qualified for the BDO World Darts Championship in 2003, defeating James Wade in the first round before losing to Mervyn King. Harbour then played in the PDC in UK Open regionals and a last 16 place in the Welsh Regional Final helped him qualify for the 2004 UK Open, beating the only lady on the field Deta Hedman in the first round and then defeated Wayne Atwood and Adrian Lewis to reach the last 32 stage where he lost to Wayne Mardle. Harbour qualified for Lakeside a second time, doing so in 2006. On this occasion, he was drawn against another qualifier Jelle Klaasen of the Netherlands. Harbour took a 2–0 lead before Klaasen mounted a comeback and went on to win the match 3–2 and eventually became the youngest ever World Champion in history. Harbour appeared as a contestant on the popular darts quiz show Bullseye and managed to win a car. Harbour has qualified for the 2016 BDO World Championships, this was a result of a fine performance in 2015 winning the Scottish Open and Isle of Man Open beating Glen Durrant in both finals. Dennis also owns the world record for most 180s in a row without winning a set with 7.

== World Championship results ==
=== BDO ===
- 2003: Second round (lost to Mervyn King 1–3)
- 2006: First round (lost to Jelle Klaasen 2–3)
- 2016: Quarter-finals (lost to Jeff Smith 2–5)
- 2017: First round (lost to Scott Waites 1–3)

=== WSDT ===
- 2023: Second round (lost to Kevin Painter 0–3)
