= 2012 World Matchplay =

2012 Betfair World Matchplay

Tournament information
- Dates: 21–29 July 2012
- Venue: Winter Gardens
- Location: Blackpool, England
- Organisation(s): Professional Darts Corporation (PDC)
- Format: Legs; Final – best of 35
- Prize fund: £400,000
- Winner's share: £100,000
- Nine-dart finish: Michael van Gerwen; Wes Newton
- High checkout: 170; Phil Taylor (×2); Dave Chisnall; Joe Cullen

Champion(s)
- Phil Taylor (ENG)

The 2012 Betfair World Matchplay was the 19th annual staging of the World Matchplay, organised by the Professional Darts Corporation. The tournament took place from 21 to 29 July 2012 at the Winter Gardens, Blackpool.

Phil Taylor was the defending champion, and retained his title for the fifth successive time and thirteenth in total with an 18–15 win over James Wade in the final.

Two nine-dart finishes were made during the tournament. Michael van Gerwen recorded the first during his second round victory over Steve Beaton. Wes Newton repeated the feat a day later, during his second round loss against Justin Pipe. This was the third consecutive year that at least one nine-dart finish was thrown in the Matchplay.

== Prize money ==
For the fourth consecutive World Matchplay, the prize fund was £400,000.

Position (no. of players)		Prize money (Total: £400,000)
Winner	(1)	£100,000
Runner-Up	(1)	£50,000
Semi-finalists	(2)	£25,000
Quarter-finalists	(4)	£15,000
Second round	(8)	£7,500
First round	(16)	£5,000
Nine-dart finish	(2)	£2,500

== Qualification ==
The top 16 in the PDC Order of Merit qualified as seeded players. The other 16 places went to the top 16 non-qualified players from the PDC ProTour Order of Merit who are unseeded players.

=== PDC Top 16 ===
1. (England) Phil Taylor (winner)
2. (England) Adrian Lewis (quarter-finals)
3. (England) James Wade (runner-up)
4. (Scotland) Gary Anderson (first round)
5. (England) Wes Newton (second round)
6. (Australia) Simon Whitlock (first round)
7. (Netherlands) Raymond van Barneveld (second round)
8. (England) Andy Hamilton (quarter-finals)
9. (Wales) Mark Webster (second round)
10. (England) Terry Jenkins (semi-finals)
11. (England) Kevin Painter (first round)
12. (England) Justin Pipe (quarter-finals)
13. (England) Dave Chisnall (first round)
14. (England) Mark Walsh (second round)
15. (Australia) Paul Nicholson (first round)
16. (Netherlands) Vincent van der Voort (first round)

=== PDC ProTour qualifiers ===
1. (Belgium) Kim Huybrechts (first round)
2. (Netherlands) Michael van Gerwen (quarter-finals)
3. (England) Ronnie Baxter (semi-finals)
4. (England) Colin Lloyd (first round)
5. (England) Andy Smith (second round)
6. (England) Ian White (second round)
7. (Northern Ireland) Brendan Dolan (first round)
8. (England) Michael Smith (first round)
9. (Wales) Richie Burnett (first round)
10. (England) Mervyn King (first round)
11. (Scotland) Robert Thornton (first round)
12. (England) Colin Osborne (first round)
13. (England) James Hubbard (first round)
14. (England) Dean Winstanley (second round)
15. (England) Steve Beaton (second round)
16. (England) Joe Cullen (first round)

== Draw ==
First round (best of 19 legs); 21–24 July
1	(England) Phil Taylor 103.10	10
(England) Mervyn King 97.54	8
16	(Netherlands) Vincent van der Voort 92.86	5
(England) Ian White 95.40	10
8	(England) Andy Hamilton 90.42	10
(Northern Ireland) Brendan Dolan 85.60	7
9	(Wales) Mark Webster 86.69	10
(England) Colin Lloyd 84.80	6
5	(England) Wes Newton 98.23	10
(England) James Hubbard 90.21	5
12	(England) Justin Pipe 95.15	10
(England) Joe Cullen 92.91	4
4	(Scotland) Gary Anderson 89.77	11
(England) Dean Winstanley 95.02	13
13	(England) Dave Chisnall 95.49	7
(England) Ronnie Baxter 94.52	10
2	(England) Adrian Lewis 100.87	10
(Scotland) Robert Thornton 88.17	0
15	(Australia) Paul Nicholson 83.85	6
(England) Andy Smith 89.65	10
7	(Netherlands) Raymond van Barneveld 97.93	10
(England) Michael Smith 90.70	4
10	(England) Terry Jenkins 96.88	11
(Belgium) Kim Huybrechts 98.69	9
6	(Australia) Simon Whitlock 92.08	6
(Netherlands) Michael van Gerwen 98.74	10
11	(England) Kevin Painter 88.01	6
(England) Steve Beaton 95.57	10
3	(England) James Wade 97.24	10
(Wales) Richie Burnett 95.09	5
14	(England) Mark Walsh 89.59	10
(England) Colin Osborne 88.66	8

Second round (best of 25 legs); 25–26 July
1	(England) Phil Taylor 91.71	13
(England) Ian White 88.78	3
8	(England) Andy Hamilton 95.62	13
9	(Wales) Mark Webster 87.72	6
5	(England) Wes Newton 96.98	10
12	(England) Justin Pipe 94.02	13
(England) Dean Winstanley 93.60	8
(England) Ronnie Baxter 93.23	13
2	(England) Adrian Lewis 94.58	13
(England) Andy Smith 89.14	7
7	(Netherlands) Raymond van Barneveld 91.41	10
10	(England) Terry Jenkins 92.86	13
(Netherlands) Michael van Gerwen 104.36	13
(England) Steve Beaton 100.88	9
3	(England) James Wade 99.72	13
14	(England) Mark Walsh 88.00	4

Quarter-finals (best of 31 legs); 27 July
1	(England) Phil Taylor 105.05	16
8	(England) Andy Hamilton 99.72	11
12	(England) Justin Pipe 91.47	11
(England) Ronnie Baxter 97.05	16
2	(England) Adrian Lewis 93.34	12
10	(England) Terry Jenkins 96.94	16
(Netherlands) Michael van Gerwen 100.31	13
3	(England) James Wade 102.54	16

Semi-finals (best of 33 legs); 28 July
1	(England) Phil Taylor 103.39	17
(England) Ronnie Baxter 92.53	10
10	(England) Terry Jenkins 93.12	15
3	(England) James Wade 97.45	17

Final (best of 35 legs); 29 July
1	(England) Phil Taylor 98.97	18
3	(England) James Wade 95.92	15

== Statistics ==
Player	Eliminated	Played	Legs Won	Legs Lost	LWAT	100+	140+	180s	High checkout	3-dart average
(England) Phil Taylor	Winner	5	74	47	29	158	81	28	170 (x2)	100.44
(England) James Wade	Final	5	71	55	29	179	95	29	164	98.57
(England) Terry Jenkins	Semi-finals	4	55	48	19	139	90	24	140	94.95
(England) Ronnie Baxter	Semi-finals	4	49	43	16	133	63	19	150	94.33
(Netherlands) Michael van Gerwen	Quarter-finals	3	36	31	14	94	47	14	141	101.14
(England) Adrian Lewis	Quarter-finals	3	35	23	12	75	36	19	149	96.26
(England) Justin Pipe	Quarter-finals	3	34	30	11	83	47	19	132	93.55
(England) Andy Hamilton	Quarter-finals	3	34	29	14	62	33	22	127	95.25
(England) Steve Beaton	Second round	2	19	19	5	58	20	9	90	98.23
(England) Wes Newton	Second round	2	20	18	8	38	31	12	144	97.61
(Netherlands) Raymond van Barneveld	Second round	2	20	17	6	54	25	11	109	94.67
(England) Dean Winstanley	Second round	2	21	24	7	50	33	17	127	94.31
(England) Ian White	Second round	2	13	18	2	36	22	8	164	92.09
(England) Andy Smith	Second round	2	17	19	5	51	24	6	100	89.40
(England) Mark Walsh	Second round	2	14	21	6	57	23	7	126	88.80
(Wales) Mark Webster	Second round	2	16	19	7	44	15	6	116	87.16
(Belgium) Kim Huybrechts	First round	1	9	11	2	35	15	4	167	98.69
(England) Mervyn King	First round	1	8	10	1	26	12	8	101	97.54
(England) Dave Chisnall	First round	1	7	10	4	21	7	7	170	95.49
(Wales) Richie Burnett	First round	1	5	10	2	20	12	4	76	95.09
(Australia) Simon Whitlock	First round	1	6	10	2	23	8	3	115	92.08
(Scotland) Gary Anderson	First round	1	11	13	4	22	16	8	120	89.77
(England) Colin Osborne	First round	1	8	10	4	25	8	2	96	88.66
(Northern Ireland) Brendan Dolan	First round	1	7	10	1	23	12	1	117	85.60
(Netherlands) Vincent van der Voort	First round	1	5	10	0	14	9	4	84	92.86
(England) James Hubbard	First round	1	5	10	2	22	4	5	88	90.21
(England) Kevin Painter	First round	1	6	10	1	23	12	1	160	88.01
(England) Joe Cullen	First round	1	4	10	1	16	8	4	170	92.91
(England) Michael Smith	First round	1	4	10	0	15	8	3	126	90.70
(England) Colin Lloyd	First round	1	6	10	3	19	9	3	140	84.80
(Australia) Paul Nicholson	First round	1	6	10	2	23	6	3	100	83.85
(Scotland) Robert Thornton	First round	1	0	10	0	17	3	1	–	88.17

Source: Match reports from the draw.
