= 2017 Denmark Open darts =

Denmark Open

Tournament information
- Dates: 28-29 April 2017
- Location: Esbjerg
- Country: Denmark
- Organisation(s): BDO, WDF, DDU
- Format: Legs
- Prize fund: DDK 70,800
- Winner's share: DDK 28,000

Champion(s)
- (England) Scott Mitchell

2017 Denmark Open is a darts tournament, which will take place in Esbjerg, Denmark on April 28 and 29, 2017. Darius Labanauskas is the defending champion.
