= 2015 Grand Slam of Darts =

2015 Singha Beer Grand Slam of Darts

Tournament information
- Dates: 7–15 November 2015
- Venue: Wolverhampton Civic Hall
- Location: Wolverhampton
- Country: England
- Organisation(s): PDC
- Format: Legs
- Prize fund: £400,000
- Winner's share: £100,000
- Nine-dart finish: (England) Dave Chisnall
- High checkout: 170 (England) Robbie Green (England) Dave Chisnall (Netherlands) Michael van Gerwen

Champion(s)
- (Netherlands) Michael van Gerwen

The 2015 Singha Beer Grand Slam of Darts, was the ninth staging of the tournament, organised by the Professional Darts Corporation. The event took take place from 7–15 November 2015 at the Wolverhampton Civic Hall, Wolverhampton, England.

Phil Taylor was the defending champion, having won his sixth Grand Slam title by defeating Dave Chisnall 16–13 in the 2014 final.

The 2015 edition saw several changes in the qualification criteria due to the Grand Slam of Darts being a PDC Order of Merit ranking tournament for the first time. As a result of this, at most 20 places were filled by invitations and the remaining 12 places were open for qualification.

The tournament was won by Michael van Gerwen, who had a tournament average over 100, and with this title won every current PDC major tournament at least once.

Other notable things that happened in the tournament included Dave Chisnall hitting a nine-dart finish against Peter Wright in their group match, and BDO veteran Martin Adams making his first appearance at the event, after declining his invite every year since the tournament's inception in 2007.

== Prize money ==
Position (num. of players)		Prize money (Total: £400,000)
Winner	(1)	£100,000
Runner-up	(1)	£50,000
Semi-finalists	(2)	£25,000
Quarter-finalists	(4)	£15,000
Last 16 (second round)	(8)	£7,500
Third in group	(8)	£5,000
Fourth in group	(8)	£2,500
Group winner bonus	(8)	£2,500
Nine-dart finish	(1)	£30,000

== Qualifying ==
=== Qualifying tournaments ===
==== PDC main tournaments ====
Players in italics had already qualified for the event. At most 16 players could qualify through this method, where the position in the list depicts the priority of the qualification.

PDC Main Tournaments
Tournament	Year	Position	Player	Qualifiers
PDC World Darts Championship	2015	Winner	(Scotland) Gary Anderson	(Scotland) Gary Anderson (England) Phil Taylor (Netherlands) Michael van Gerwen (Scotland) Robert Thornton (England) Keegan Brown (England) Adrian Lewis (England) Dave Chisnall (England) James Wade (Scotland) Peter Wright (Netherlands) Raymond van Barneveld (Austria) Rowby-John Rodriguez
Grand Slam of Darts	2014	Winner	(England) Phil Taylor	(Scotland) Gary Anderson (England) Phil Taylor (Netherlands) Michael van Gerwen (Scotland) Robert Thornton (England) Keegan Brown (England) Adrian Lewis (England) Dave Chisnall (England) James Wade (Scotland) Peter Wright (Netherlands) Raymond van Barneveld (Austria) Rowby-John Rodriguez
Premier League Darts	2015	Winner	(Scotland) Gary Anderson	(Scotland) Gary Anderson (England) Phil Taylor (Netherlands) Michael van Gerwen (Scotland) Robert Thornton (England) Keegan Brown (England) Adrian Lewis (England) Dave Chisnall (England) James Wade (Scotland) Peter Wright (Netherlands) Raymond van Barneveld (Austria) Rowby-John Rodriguez
World Matchplay	2015	Winner	(Netherlands) Michael van Gerwen	(Scotland) Gary Anderson (England) Phil Taylor (Netherlands) Michael van Gerwen (Scotland) Robert Thornton (England) Keegan Brown (England) Adrian Lewis (England) Dave Chisnall (England) James Wade (Scotland) Peter Wright (Netherlands) Raymond van Barneveld (Austria) Rowby-John Rodriguez
World Grand Prix	2015	Winner	(Scotland) Robert Thornton	(Scotland) Gary Anderson (England) Phil Taylor (Netherlands) Michael van Gerwen (Scotland) Robert Thornton (England) Keegan Brown (England) Adrian Lewis (England) Dave Chisnall (England) James Wade (Scotland) Peter Wright (Netherlands) Raymond van Barneveld (Austria) Rowby-John Rodriguez
Players Championship Finals	2014	Winner	(Scotland) Gary Anderson	(Scotland) Gary Anderson (England) Phil Taylor (Netherlands) Michael van Gerwen (Scotland) Robert Thornton (England) Keegan Brown (England) Adrian Lewis (England) Dave Chisnall (England) James Wade (Scotland) Peter Wright (Netherlands) Raymond van Barneveld (Austria) Rowby-John Rodriguez
UK Open	2015	Winner	(Netherlands) Michael van Gerwen	(Scotland) Gary Anderson (England) Phil Taylor (Netherlands) Michael van Gerwen (Scotland) Robert Thornton (England) Keegan Brown (England) Adrian Lewis (England) Dave Chisnall (England) James Wade (Scotland) Peter Wright (Netherlands) Raymond van Barneveld (Austria) Rowby-John Rodriguez
European Championship	2015	Winner	(Netherlands) Michael van Gerwen	(Scotland) Gary Anderson (England) Phil Taylor (Netherlands) Michael van Gerwen (Scotland) Robert Thornton (England) Keegan Brown (England) Adrian Lewis (England) Dave Chisnall (England) James Wade (Scotland) Peter Wright (Netherlands) Raymond van Barneveld (Austria) Rowby-John Rodriguez
Masters	2015	Winner	(Netherlands) Michael van Gerwen	(Scotland) Gary Anderson (England) Phil Taylor (Netherlands) Michael van Gerwen (Scotland) Robert Thornton (England) Keegan Brown (England) Adrian Lewis (England) Dave Chisnall (England) James Wade (Scotland) Peter Wright (Netherlands) Raymond van Barneveld (Austria) Rowby-John Rodriguez
PDC World Youth Championship	2014	Winner	(England) Keegan Brown	(Scotland) Gary Anderson (England) Phil Taylor (Netherlands) Michael van Gerwen (Scotland) Robert Thornton (England) Keegan Brown (England) Adrian Lewis (England) Dave Chisnall (England) James Wade (Scotland) Peter Wright (Netherlands) Raymond van Barneveld (Austria) Rowby-John Rodriguez
World Series of Darts	2015	Ranking List Leader	(England) Phil Taylor	(Scotland) Gary Anderson (England) Phil Taylor (Netherlands) Michael van Gerwen (Scotland) Robert Thornton (England) Keegan Brown (England) Adrian Lewis (England) Dave Chisnall (England) James Wade (Scotland) Peter Wright (Netherlands) Raymond van Barneveld (Austria) Rowby-John Rodriguez
PDC World Cup of Darts	2015	Winners	(England) Phil Taylor (England) Adrian Lewis	(Scotland) Gary Anderson (England) Phil Taylor (Netherlands) Michael van Gerwen (Scotland) Robert Thornton (England) Keegan Brown (England) Adrian Lewis (England) Dave Chisnall (England) James Wade (Scotland) Peter Wright (Netherlands) Raymond van Barneveld (Austria) Rowby-John Rodriguez
PDC World Darts Championship	2015	Runner-Up	(England) Phil Taylor	(Scotland) Gary Anderson (England) Phil Taylor (Netherlands) Michael van Gerwen (Scotland) Robert Thornton (England) Keegan Brown (England) Adrian Lewis (England) Dave Chisnall (England) James Wade (Scotland) Peter Wright (Netherlands) Raymond van Barneveld (Austria) Rowby-John Rodriguez
Grand Slam of Darts	2014	Runner-Up	(England) Dave Chisnall	(Scotland) Gary Anderson (England) Phil Taylor (Netherlands) Michael van Gerwen (Scotland) Robert Thornton (England) Keegan Brown (England) Adrian Lewis (England) Dave Chisnall (England) James Wade (Scotland) Peter Wright (Netherlands) Raymond van Barneveld (Austria) Rowby-John Rodriguez
Premier League Darts	2015	Runner-Up	(Netherlands) Michael van Gerwen	(Scotland) Gary Anderson (England) Phil Taylor (Netherlands) Michael van Gerwen (Scotland) Robert Thornton (England) Keegan Brown (England) Adrian Lewis (England) Dave Chisnall (England) James Wade (Scotland) Peter Wright (Netherlands) Raymond van Barneveld (Austria) Rowby-John Rodriguez
World Matchplay	2015	Runner-Up	(England) James Wade	(Scotland) Gary Anderson (England) Phil Taylor (Netherlands) Michael van Gerwen (Scotland) Robert Thornton (England) Keegan Brown (England) Adrian Lewis (England) Dave Chisnall (England) James Wade (Scotland) Peter Wright (Netherlands) Raymond van Barneveld (Austria) Rowby-John Rodriguez
World Grand Prix	2015	Runner-Up	(Netherlands) Michael van Gerwen	(Scotland) Gary Anderson (England) Phil Taylor (Netherlands) Michael van Gerwen (Scotland) Robert Thornton (England) Keegan Brown (England) Adrian Lewis (England) Dave Chisnall (England) James Wade (Scotland) Peter Wright (Netherlands) Raymond van Barneveld (Austria) Rowby-John Rodriguez
Players Championship Finals	2014	Runner-Up	(England) Adrian Lewis	(Scotland) Gary Anderson (England) Phil Taylor (Netherlands) Michael van Gerwen (Scotland) Robert Thornton (England) Keegan Brown (England) Adrian Lewis (England) Dave Chisnall (England) James Wade (Scotland) Peter Wright (Netherlands) Raymond van Barneveld (Austria) Rowby-John Rodriguez
UK Open	2015	Runner-Up	(Scotland) Peter Wright	(Scotland) Gary Anderson (England) Phil Taylor (Netherlands) Michael van Gerwen (Scotland) Robert Thornton (England) Keegan Brown (England) Adrian Lewis (England) Dave Chisnall (England) James Wade (Scotland) Peter Wright (Netherlands) Raymond van Barneveld (Austria) Rowby-John Rodriguez
European Championship	2015	Runner-Up	(Scotland) Gary Anderson	(Scotland) Gary Anderson (England) Phil Taylor (Netherlands) Michael van Gerwen (Scotland) Robert Thornton (England) Keegan Brown (England) Adrian Lewis (England) Dave Chisnall (England) James Wade (Scotland) Peter Wright (Netherlands) Raymond van Barneveld (Austria) Rowby-John Rodriguez
Masters	2015	Runner-Up	(Netherlands) Raymond van Barneveld	(Scotland) Gary Anderson (England) Phil Taylor (Netherlands) Michael van Gerwen (Scotland) Robert Thornton (England) Keegan Brown (England) Adrian Lewis (England) Dave Chisnall (England) James Wade (Scotland) Peter Wright (Netherlands) Raymond van Barneveld (Austria) Rowby-John Rodriguez
PDC World Youth Championship	2014	Runner-Up	(Austria) Rowby-John Rodriguez	(Scotland) Gary Anderson (England) Phil Taylor (Netherlands) Michael van Gerwen (Scotland) Robert Thornton (England) Keegan Brown (England) Adrian Lewis (England) Dave Chisnall (England) James Wade (Scotland) Peter Wright (Netherlands) Raymond van Barneveld (Austria) Rowby-John Rodriguez
World Series of Darts	2015	Ranking List Runner-Up	(England) Adrian Lewis	(Scotland) Gary Anderson (England) Phil Taylor (Netherlands) Michael van Gerwen (Scotland) Robert Thornton (England) Keegan Brown (England) Adrian Lewis (England) Dave Chisnall (England) James Wade (Scotland) Peter Wright (Netherlands) Raymond van Barneveld (Austria) Rowby-John Rodriguez
PDC World Cup of Darts	2015	Runners-Up	(Scotland) Gary Anderson (Scotland) Peter Wright	(Scotland) Gary Anderson (England) Phil Taylor (Netherlands) Michael van Gerwen (Scotland) Robert Thornton (England) Keegan Brown (England) Adrian Lewis (England) Dave Chisnall (England) James Wade (Scotland) Peter Wright (Netherlands) Raymond van Barneveld (Austria) Rowby-John Rodriguez
Note: Players in italics had already qualified for the tournament.				(Scotland) Gary Anderson (England) Phil Taylor (Netherlands) Michael van Gerwen (Scotland) Robert Thornton (England) Keegan Brown (England) Adrian Lewis (England) Dave Chisnall (England) James Wade (Scotland) Peter Wright (Netherlands) Raymond van Barneveld (Austria) Rowby-John Rodriguez

==== PDC European Tour ====
In case the list of qualifiers from the main tournaments produced fewer than 16 players, the field of 16 players was filled from the reserve lists. The first list consisted of the winners from 2015 European Tour events, in which the winners were selected in ProTour Order of Merit position order at the cut-off date.

PDC European Tour
Tournament	Event	Position	Player	Qualifiers
2015 European Tour	2015 German Darts Championship	Winner	(Netherlands) Michael van Gerwen	(England) Michael Smith (Belgium) Kim Huybrechts
2015 European Tour	2015 Gibraltar Darts Trophy	Winner	(Netherlands) Michael van Gerwen	(England) Michael Smith (Belgium) Kim Huybrechts
2015 European Tour	2015 German Darts Masters	Winner	(Netherlands) Michael van Gerwen	(England) Michael Smith (Belgium) Kim Huybrechts
2015 European Tour	2015 Dutch Darts Masters	Winner	(Netherlands) Michael van Gerwen	(England) Michael Smith (Belgium) Kim Huybrechts
2015 European Tour	2015 International Darts Open	Winner	(England) Michael Smith	(England) Michael Smith (Belgium) Kim Huybrechts
2015 European Tour	2015 European Darts Open	Winner	(Scotland) Robert Thornton	(England) Michael Smith (Belgium) Kim Huybrechts
2015 European Tour	2015 European Darts Trophy	Winner	(England) Michael Smith	(England) Michael Smith (Belgium) Kim Huybrechts
2015 European Tour	2015 European Darts Matchplay	Winner	(Netherlands) Michael van Gerwen	(England) Michael Smith (Belgium) Kim Huybrechts
2015 European Tour	2015 European Darts Grand Prix	Winner	(Belgium) Kim Huybrechts	(England) Michael Smith (Belgium) Kim Huybrechts
Note: Players in italics had already qualified for the tournament.				(England) Michael Smith (Belgium) Kim Huybrechts

==== PDC Players Championships ====
In case the list of qualifiers from the main tournaments and the European Tour produced fewer than 16 players, the field of 16 players was filled from the reserve lists. The second list consists of the winners from 2015 Players Championship events, in which the winners were selected in ProTour Order of Merit position order at the cut-off date.

PDC Players Championships
Tournament	Event	Position	Player	Qualifiers
2015 Players Championships	Players Championship 1	Winner	(Scotland) Gary Anderson	(England) Ian White (Netherlands) Jelle Klaasen (England) Terry Jenkins
2015 Players Championships	Players Championship 2	Winner	(England) James Wade	(England) Ian White (Netherlands) Jelle Klaasen (England) Terry Jenkins
2015 Players Championships	Players Championship 3	Winner	(England) Adrian Lewis	(England) Ian White (Netherlands) Jelle Klaasen (England) Terry Jenkins
2015 Players Championships	Players Championship 4	Winner	(Netherlands) Michael van Gerwen	(England) Ian White (Netherlands) Jelle Klaasen (England) Terry Jenkins
2015 Players Championships	Players Championship 5	Winner	(England) Adrian Lewis	(England) Ian White (Netherlands) Jelle Klaasen (England) Terry Jenkins
2015 Players Championships	Players Championship 6	Winner	(Netherlands) Michael van Gerwen	(England) Ian White (Netherlands) Jelle Klaasen (England) Terry Jenkins
2015 Players Championships	Players Championship 7	Winner	(Scotland) Peter Wright	(England) Ian White (Netherlands) Jelle Klaasen (England) Terry Jenkins
2015 Players Championships	Players Championship 8	Winner	(England) Keegan Brown	(England) Ian White (Netherlands) Jelle Klaasen (England) Terry Jenkins
2015 Players Championships	Players Championship 9	Winner	(England) Phil Taylor	(England) Ian White (Netherlands) Jelle Klaasen (England) Terry Jenkins
2015 Players Championships	Players Championship 10	Winner	(England) Joe Murnan	(England) Ian White (Netherlands) Jelle Klaasen (England) Terry Jenkins
2015 Players Championships	Players Championship 11	Winner	(England) Dave Chisnall	(England) Ian White (Netherlands) Jelle Klaasen (England) Terry Jenkins
2015 Players Championships	Players Championship 12	Winner	(Scotland) Peter Wright	(England) Ian White (Netherlands) Jelle Klaasen (England) Terry Jenkins
2015 Players Championships	Players Championship 13	Winner	(England) James Wade	(England) Ian White (Netherlands) Jelle Klaasen (England) Terry Jenkins
2015 Players Championships	Players Championship 14	Winner	(Netherlands) Jelle Klaasen	(England) Ian White (Netherlands) Jelle Klaasen (England) Terry Jenkins
2015 Players Championships	Players Championship 15	Winner	(England) Terry Jenkins	(England) Ian White (Netherlands) Jelle Klaasen (England) Terry Jenkins
2015 Players Championships	Players Championship 16	Winner	(Netherlands) Jelle Klaasen	(England) Ian White (Netherlands) Jelle Klaasen (England) Terry Jenkins
2015 Players Championships	Players Championship 17	Winner	(England) Ian White	(England) Ian White (Netherlands) Jelle Klaasen (England) Terry Jenkins
2015 Players Championships	Players Championship 18	Winner	(England) Alan Norris	(England) Ian White (Netherlands) Jelle Klaasen (England) Terry Jenkins
2015 Players Championships	Players Championship 19	Winner	(Scotland) Peter Wright	(England) Ian White (Netherlands) Jelle Klaasen (England) Terry Jenkins
2015 Players Championships	Players Championship 20	Winner	(Scotland) Gary Anderson	(England) Ian White (Netherlands) Jelle Klaasen (England) Terry Jenkins
Note: Players in italics had already qualified for the tournament.				(England) Ian White (Netherlands) Jelle Klaasen (England) Terry Jenkins

=== PDC qualifier ===
A further eight places in the Grand Slam of Darts were filled by qualifiers from a PDC qualifier in Coventry on 23 October 2015.

- (Wales) Mark Webster
- (Wales) Jonny Clayton
- (England) Mervyn King
- (England) Steve West
- (England) Wayne Jones
- (England) Andy Boulton
- (England) Robbie Green
- (England) Steve Beaton

=== BDO qualifying tournaments ===
Tournament	Year	Position	Player
BDO World Darts Championship	2015	Winner	(England) Scott Mitchell
BDO World Darts Championship	2015	Runner-Up	(England) Martin Adams
World Masters	2014	Winner	(Wales) Martin Phillips
BDO World Trophy	2015	Winner	(Belgium) Geert De Vos

=== BDO qualifiers ===
A further four places in the Grand Slam of Darts were filled by qualifiers from two BDO qualifiers. The first of which was in Hull on 6 October 2015 and was open for all players outside of mainland Europe. The other one was in Europe on 18 October 2015 and was open for all players in mainland Europe.

==== UK qualifiers ====
- (United States) Larry Butler
- (England) Andy Fordham

==== European qualifiers ====
- (Netherlands) Mark Oosterhuis
- (Netherlands) Michel van der Horst

== Pools ==
Pool A (Seeded Players)	Pool B (PDC Automatic Qualifiers)	Pool C (PDC Qualifiers)	Pool D (BDO Qualifiers)
(Netherlands) Michael van Gerwen (1) (Scotland) Gary Anderson (2) (England) Phil Taylor (3) (Scotland) Peter Wright (4) (England) Adrian Lewis (5) (Scotland) Robert Thornton (6) (England) James Wade (7) (England) Ian White (8)	(Netherlands) Raymond van Barneveld (England) Keegan Brown (England) Dave Chisnall (Belgium) Kim Huybrechts (England) Terry Jenkins (Netherlands) Jelle Klaasen (England) Michael Smith (Austria) Rowby-John Rodriguez	(England) Steve Beaton (England) Andy Boulton (Wales) Jonny Clayton (England) Robbie Green (England) Wayne Jones (England) Mervyn King (Wales) Mark Webster (England) Steve West	(England) Martin Adams (United States) Larry Butler (England) Andy Fordham (Netherlands) Michel van der Horst (England) Scott Mitchell (Netherlands) Mark Oosterhuis (Wales) Martin Phillips (Belgium) Geert De Vos

== Draw ==
=== Group stage ===
All matches first-to-5/best of 9 legs
NB in Brackets: Number = Seeds; BDO = BDO Darts player; Q = Qualifier
NB: P = Played; W = Won; L = Lost; LF = Legs for; LA = Legs against; +/− = Plus/minus record, in relation to legs; Average = 3-dart average; Pts = Points; Q = Qualified for K.O. phase

==== Group A ====
Pos.	Player	P	W	L	LF	LA	+/–	Pts	Status
1	(Netherlands) Michael van Gerwen (1)	3	3	0	15	4	+11	6	Q
2	(Belgium) Kim Huybrechts	3	2	1	11	9	+2	4	Q
3	(England) Steve West (Q)	3	1	2	10	10	0	2	Eliminated
4	(Netherlands) Mark Oosterhuis (BDO, Q)	3	0	3	2	15	–13	0	Eliminated

7 November

105.92 Kim Huybrechts (Belgium)	5 – 2	(England) Steve West 94.88
102.95 Michael van Gerwen (Netherlands)	5 – 0	(Netherlands) Mark Oosterhuis 67.63

8 November

93.94 Steve West (England)	5 – 0	(Netherlands) Mark Oosterhuis 74.54
106.23 Michael van Gerwen (Netherlands)	5 – 1	(Belgium) Kim Huybrechts 106.50

10 November

96.20 Kim Huybrechts (Belgium)	5 – 2	(Netherlands) Mark Oosterhuis 86.38
105.38 Michael van Gerwen (Netherlands)	5 – 3	(England) Steve West 92.31

==== Group B ====
Pos.	Player	P	W	L	LF	LA	+/−	Pts	Status
1	(England) Martin Adams (BDO)	3	3	0	15	10	+5	6	Q
2	(England) Steve Beaton (Q)	3	1	2	13	12	+1	2	Q
3	(England) Ian White (8)	3	1	2	9	11	–2	2	Eliminated
4	(Netherlands) Jelle Klaasen	3	1	2	10	14	–4	2	Eliminated

7 November

92.62 Jelle Klaasen (Netherlands)	5 – 4	(England) Steve Beaton 96.52
99.67 Ian White (England)	2 – 5	(England) Martin Adams 104.82

8 November

91.07 Ian White (England)	2 – 5	(England) Steve Beaton 90.68
104.69 Jelle Klaasen (Netherlands)	4 – 5	(England) Martin Adams 93.47

10 November

97.96 Ian White (England)	5 – 1	(Netherlands) Jelle Klaasen 86.56
96.78 Steve Beaton (England)	4 – 5	(England) Martin Adams 95.63

==== Group C ====
Pos.	Player	P	W	L	LF	LA	+/−	Pts	Status
1	(England) Michael Smith	3	3	0	15	8	+7	6	Q
2	(England) Adrian Lewis (5)	3	2	1	13	10	+3	4	Q
3	(England) Andy Fordham (BDO, Q)	3	1	2	9	13	–4	2	Eliminated
4	(England) Wayne Jones (Q)	3	0	3	9	15	–6	0	Eliminated

7 November

94.77 Michael Smith (England)	5 – 3	(England) Wayne Jones 88.17
103.34 Adrian Lewis (England)	5 – 2	(England) Andy Fordham 99.26

8 November

82.95 Wayne Jones (England)	3 – 5	(England) Andy Fordham 79.44
94.90 Adrian Lewis (England)	3 – 5	(England) Michael Smith 95.88

10 November

92.36 Michael Smith (England)	5 – 2	(England) Andy Fordham 84.11
96.30 Adrian Lewis (England)	5 – 3	(England) Wayne Jones 93.77

==== Group D ====
Pos.	Player	P	W	L	LF	LA	+/−	Pts	Status
1	(Scotland) Peter Wright (4)	3	2	1	12	10	+2	4	Q
2	(England) Dave Chisnall	3	2	1	11	10	+1	4	Q
3	(England) Mervyn King (Q)	3	1	2	11	12	–1	2	Eliminated
4	(England) Scott Mitchell (BDO)	3	1	2	9	11	–2	2	Eliminated

7 November

96.52 Dave Chisnall (England)	5 – 3	(England) Mervyn King 88.13
96.86 Peter Wright (Scotland)	5 – 2	(England) Scott Mitchell 104.49

8 November

104.31 Mervyn King (England)	5 – 2	(England) Scott Mitchell 93.18
98.62 Peter Wright (Scotland)	2 – 5	(England) Dave Chisnall 109.84

10 November

98.41 Dave Chisnall (England)	1 – 5	(England) Scott Mitchell 93.60
94.02 Peter Wright (Scotland)	5 – 3	(England) Mervyn King 81.50

==== Group E ====
Pos.	Player	P	W	L	LF	LA	+/–	Pts	Status
1	(Scotland) Gary Anderson (2)	3	3	0	15	4	+11	6	Q
2	(Netherlands) Raymond van Barneveld	3	2	1	13	8	+5	4	Q
3	(United States) Larry Butler (BDO, Q)	3	1	2	8	14	–6	2	Eliminated
4	(England) Andy Boulton (Q)	3	0	3	5	15	–10	0	Eliminated

7 November

101.55 Gary Anderson (Scotland)	5 – 0	(United States) Larry Butler 83.00
98.88 Raymond van Barneveld (Netherlands)	5 – 0	(England) Andy Boulton 87.42

8 November

90.37 Andy Boulton (England)	4 – 5	(United States) Larry Butler 88.31
103.36 Gary Anderson (Scotland)	5 – 3	(Netherlands) Raymond van Barneveld 105.93

9 November

95.26 Raymond van Barneveld (Netherlands)	5 – 3	(United States) Larry Butler 97.32
102.79 Gary Anderson (Scotland)	5 – 1	(England) Andy Boulton 89.46

==== Group F ====
Pos.	Player	P	W	L	LF	LA	+/−	Pts	Status
1	(England) James Wade (7)	3	3	0	15	5	+10	6	Q
2	(Wales) Mark Webster (Q)	3	2	1	11	11	0	4	Q
3	(England) Keegan Brown	3	1	2	10	14	–4	2	Eliminated
4	(Netherlands) Michel van der Horst (BDO, Q)	3	0	3	9	15	–6	0	Eliminated

7 November

94.72 James Wade (England)	5 – 2	(Netherlands) Michel van der Horst 87.73
81.68 Keegan Brown (England)	3 – 5	(Wales) Mark Webster 93.90

8 November

85.25 Keegan Brown (England)	5 – 4	(Netherlands) Michel van der Horst 81.59
105.83 James Wade (England)	5 – 1	(Wales) Mark Webster 96.11

9 November

92.67 Mark Webster (Wales)	5 – 3	(Netherlands) Michel van der Horst 89.69
103.68 James Wade (England)	5 – 2	(England) Keegan Brown 94.47

==== Group G ====
Pos.	Player	P	W	L	LF	LA	+/–	Pts	Status
1	(Scotland) Robert Thornton (6)	3	3	0	15	10	+5	6	Q
2	(England) Terry Jenkins	3	1	2	12	10	+2	2	Q
3	(Belgium) Geert De Vos (BDO)	3	1	2	9	10	–1	2	Eliminated
4	(Wales) Jonny Clayton (Q)	3	1	2	7	13	–6	2	Eliminated

7 November

89.66 Terry Jenkins (England)	3 – 5	(Wales) Jonny Clayton 93.18
93.71 Robert Thornton (Scotland)	5 – 4	(Belgium) Geert De Vos 91.85

8 November

89.46 Terry Jenkins (England)	5 – 0	(Belgium) Geert De Vos 87.15
96.08 Robert Thornton (Scotland)	5 – 2	(Wales) Jonny Clayton 88.49

9 November

98.15 Jonny Clayton (Wales)	0 – 5	(Belgium) Geert De Vos 113.86
100.05 Robert Thornton (Scotland)	5 – 4	(England) Terry Jenkins 99.87

==== Group H ====
Pos.	Player	P	W	L	LF	LA	+/–	Pts	Status
1	(England) Phil Taylor (3)	3	3	0	15	4	+11	6	Q
2	(England) Robbie Green (Q)	3	2	1	12	9	+3	4	Q
3	(Austria) Rowby-John Rodriguez	3	1	2	10	12	–2	2	Eliminated
4	(Wales) Martin Phillips (BDO)	3	0	3	3	15	–12	0	Eliminated

7 November

94.60 Rowby-John Rodriguez (Austria)	3 – 5	(England) Robbie Green 95.00
102.95 Phil Taylor (England)	5 – 0	(Wales) Martin Phillips 97.04

8 November

94.06 Rowby-John Rodriguez (Austria)	5 – 2	(Wales) Martin Phillips 87.43
108.42 Phil Taylor (England)	5 – 2	(England) Robbie Green 88.67

9 November

94.57 Robbie Green (England)	5 – 1	(Wales) Martin Phillips 81.00
94.19 Phil Taylor (England)	5 – 2	(Austria) Rowby-John Rodriguez 96.06

=== Knockout stage ===
Second round (best of 19 legs); 11–12 November
A1	(Netherlands) Michael van Gerwen (1) 109.18	10
B2	(England) Steve Beaton (Q) 99.56	2
B1	(England) Martin Adams (BDO) 98.47	9
A2	(Belgium) Kim Huybrechts 100.87	10
C1	(England) Michael Smith 104.59	10
D2	(England) Dave Chisnall 99.82	7
D1	(Scotland) Peter Wright (4) 101.36	7
C2	(England) Adrian Lewis (5) 104.71	10
E1	(Scotland) Gary Anderson (2) 104.22	6
F2	(Wales) Mark Webster (Q) 94.89	10
F1	(England) James Wade (7) 100.05	7
E2	(Netherlands) Raymond van Barneveld 96.96	10
G1	(Scotland) Robert Thornton (6) 93.09	10
H2	(England) Robbie Green (Q) 96.61	8
H1	(England) Phil Taylor (3) 91.67	10
G2	(England) Terry Jenkins 95.16	6

Quarter-finals (best of 31 legs); 13–14 November
A1	(Netherlands) Michael van Gerwen (1) 111.05	16
A2	(Belgium) Kim Huybrechts 93.99	4
C1	(England) Michael Smith 98.03	16
C2	(England) Adrian Lewis (5) 98.63	11
F2	(Wales) Mark Webster (Q) 96.86	12
E2	(Netherlands) Raymond van Barneveld 95.37	16
G1	(Scotland) Robert Thornton (6) 93.48	7
H1	(England) Phil Taylor (3) 104.18	16

Semi-finals (best of 31 legs); 15 November
A1	(Netherlands) Michael van Gerwen (1) 102.19	16
C1	(England) Michael Smith 93.08	6
E2	(Netherlands) Raymond van Barneveld 97.07	12
H1	(England) Phil Taylor (3) 100.84	16

Final (best of 31 legs); 15 November
A1	(Netherlands) Michael van Gerwen (1) 100.94	16
H1	(England) Phil Taylor (3) 102.53	13
