= Belgium Open =

Tournament information
- Venue: Belgica Loods
- Location: Antwerp
- Country: Belgium
- Established: 1982
- Organisation(s): WDF
- Prize fund: €8,000
- Month(s) Played: August

Current champion(s)
- Jimmy van Schie (men's); Aileen de Graaf (women's)

The Belgium Open is a darts tournament that has been held since 1982.

== List of winners ==
=== Men's ===
Year	Champion	Score	Runner-up	Total Prize Money	Champion	Runner-up
1982	(Belgium) Gustaaf Demeulemeester	?–?	(Belgium) Dirk van der Eycken	?	?	?
1983	(Belgium) Willy Sonneville	?–?	(Belgium) Patrick Vanlerberghe	?	?	?
1984	(England) Ritchie Gardner	?–?	(Belgium) Gustaaf Demeulemeester	?	?	?
1985	(England) Don Dillon	?–?	(England) Lee Carter	?	?	?
1986	(England) Don Dillon	?–?	(Belgium) Freddy Laebens	£1,250	?	?
1987	(Belgium) Kurt Dumarey	?–?	(Belgium) Patrick Vanlerberghe	£1,300	?	?
1988	(Belgium) Frans Devooght	?–?	(England) Dave Hall	?	?	?
1989	(England) Alan Warriner-Little	?–?	(Scotland) Jocky Wilson	?	?	?
1990	(England) Alan Warriner-Little (2)	?–?	(England) Peter Evison	?	?	?
1991	(England) Rod Harrington	?–?	(England) Andy Fordham	?	?	?
1992	(England) Rod Harrington (2)	?–?	(Denmark) Per Skau	?	?	?
1993	(England) Steve Beaton	?–?	(Finland) Heikki Hermunen	?	?	?
1994	(England) Mike Gregory	?–?	(Belgium) Stefan Eeckelaert	?	?	?
1995	(England) Mike Gregory (2)	?–?	(Belgium) Pascal Rabau	?	?	?
1996	(Netherlands) Raymond van Barneveld	?–?	(England) Mike Gregory	?	?	?
1997	(England) Martin Adams	?–?	(Belgium) Rudy Delannoy	?	?	?
1998	(England) Martin Adams (2)	?–?	(England) Matt Clark	?	?	?
1999	(Netherlands) Raymond van Barneveld (2)	?–?	(Scotland) Les Wallace	?	?	?
2000	(Netherlands) Co Stompé	?–?	(England) John Walton	?	?	?
2001	(England) John Walton	5–3	(Finland) Marko Pusa	?	?	?
2002	(England) Ted Hankey	?–?	(England) Tony O'Shea	?	?	?
2003	(England) Tony West	5–1	(Belgium) Johnny Petermans	?	?	?
2004	(Netherlands) Willem Kralt	2–1	(Belgium) Dirk Hespeels	€1,250	?	?
2005	(Netherlands) Albertino Essers	5–4	(Netherlands) Co Stompé	?	?	?
2006	(England) Darryl Fitton	5–2	(England) Ted Hankey	?	?	?
2007	(England) Tony West (2)	5–2	(England) Ted Hankey	€7,360	€1,600	€800
2008	(England) Scott Waites	4–2	(England) Johnny Petermans	€7,360	€2,000	€1,000
2009	(Scotland) John Henderson	2–0	(England) John Walton	€8,160	€2,500	€1,200
2010	(England) Dean Winstanley	2–0	(England) Tony O'Shea	€8,860	€2,500	€1,200
2011	(Scotland) Ross Montgomery	3–0	(Netherlands) Ron Meulenkamp	€9,080	€2,300	€1,000
2012	(England) Robbie Green	3–0	(Netherlands) Christian Kist	€9,080	€2,300	€1,000
2013	(England) Martin Adams (3)	3–2	(England) James Wilson	€9,080	€2,300	€1,000
2014	(Wales) Martin Phillips	3–2	(Netherlands) Wesley Harms	€9,080	€2,300	€1,000
2015	(Netherlands) Jeffrey de Graaf	3–2	(Wales) Dean Reynolds	€8,500	€2,500	€1,000
2016	(Scotland) Ross Montgomery (2)	3–1	(Northern Ireland) Kyle McKinstry	€8,500	€2,500	€1,000
2017	(Netherlands) Derk Telnekes	3–1	(Belgium) Kenny Neyens	€5,350	€1,500	€750
2018	Glen Durrant	2–1	Andy Baetens	€5,700	€1,750	€850
2019	Nick Kenny	7–4	(Netherlands) Tonny Veenhof	€5,600	€1,600	€800
2022	Wesley Plaisier	5–0	Johan van Velzen	€5,600	€1,600	€800
2023	(Belgium) Francois Schweyen	5–2	Andy Baetens	€5,600	€1,600	€800
2024	Wesley Plaisier (2)	5–1	(Belgium) James Vanbesien	€5,600	€1,600	€800
2025	Jimmy van Schie	5–0	Matt Clark	€5,600	€1,600	€800

=== Women's ===
Year	Winner	Score	Runner-up
1983	(England) Lil Coombes		(Belgium) Christa Marreel
1984	(England) Pat Connaughton		(Belgium) Hedwige Vandierendonck
1985	(England) Lil Coombes (2)		(Belgium) Jenny van Cleven
1986	(England) Sue Brazell		(Belgium) Rita Lagace
1987	(England) Jane Kempster		(England) Sharon Colclough
1988	(England) Sharon Colclough		(Germany) Heike Ernst
1989	(England) Sharon Colclough (2)		(England) Deta Hedman
1990	(England) Sharon Colclough (3)		(England) Deta Hedman
1991	(Germany) Heike Ernst		(Belgium) Maria Vercnocke
1992	(Netherlands) Kitty van der Vliet		(England) Deta Hedman
1993	(Netherlands) Francis Hoenselaar		(England) Mandy Solomons
1994	(England) Mandy Solomons		(Netherlands) Valerie Maytum
1995	(Netherlands) Francis Hoenselaar (2)		(England) Deta Hedman
1996	(England) Deta Hedman		(Wales) Sandra Greatbatch
1997	(Netherlands) Francis Hoenselaar (3)		(England) Trina Gulliver
1998	(Netherlands) Francis Hoenselaar (4)		(England) Sally Smith
1999	(England) Trina Gulliver		(England) Karen Smith
2000	(England) Crissy Howat		(England) Trina Gulliver
2001	(England) Trina Gulliver (2)	4 – 0	(Netherlands) Mieke de Boer
2002	(Netherlands) Francis Hoenselaar (5)	4 – 1	(England) Trina Gulliver
2003	(Switzerland) Lisa Huber		(Netherlands) Francis Hoenselaar
2004	(Sweden) Vicky Pruim		(Belgium) Miranda Bols
2005	(Russia) Anastasia Dobromyslova		(Belgium) Sandra Pollet
2006	(Russia) Irina Armstrong	4 – 3	(Russia) Anastasia Dobromyslova
2007	(Netherlands) Francis Hoenselaar (6)		(Netherlands) Karin Krappen
2008	(England) Dee Bateman		(Netherlands) Rilana Erades
2009	Deta Hedman (2)		(England) Karen Lawman
2010	(England) Karen Lawman	5 – 1	(Germany) Stefanie Lück
2011	Deta Hedman (3)	2 – 0	(Wales) Julie Gore
2012	(England) Trina Gulliver (3)	2 – 1	Deta Hedman
2013	(Wales) Julie Gore	2 – 0	Deta Hedman
2014	Aileen de Graaf	2 – 0	(England) Zoe Jones
2015	Deta Hedman (4)	2 – 0	(England) Fallon Sherrock
2016	Aileen de Graaf (2)	2 – 1	(England) Lorraine Winstanley
2017	Aileen de Graaf (3)	2 – 0	(Belgium) Patricia De Peuter
2018	Lisa Ashton	2 – 1	Fallon Sherrock
2019	Aileen de Graaf (4)	6 – 2	Laura Turner
2022	Laura Turner	5 – 3	Lorraine Winstanley
2023	Noa-Lynn van Leuven	5 – 3	Rhian O'Sullivan
2024	Aileen de Graaf (5)	5 – 2	Paula Jacklin
2025	Aileen de Graaf (6)	5 – 3	Kirsi Viinikainen

== Tournament records ==
- Most wins 3: (England) Martin Adams, (England) Eric Bristow
- Most Finals 3: (England) John Walton, (England) Ted Hankey, (England) Martin Adams, (England) Mike Gregory.
- Most Semi Finals 5: (England) Ted Hankey, (England) Raymond van Barneveld.
- Most Quarter Finals 7: (England) Raymond van Barneveld.
- Most Appearances 10: (England) Ted Hankey.
- Most Prize Money won £2,479: (England) Dean Winstanley
- Best winning average (-) : v's
- Youngest Winner age 19: (Netherlands) Willem Kralt.
- Oldest Winner age 57: (England) Martin Adams.
