= Robbie Green =

English darts player (born 1974)

Personal information
- Nickname: "Kong"
- Born: 19 July 1974 (age 52) Liverpool, Merseyside, England
- Home town: Wallasey, Merseyside, England

Sport
- Sport: Darts
- Playing since: 1990
- Darts: 22g Cuesoul Signature
- Laterality: Right-handed
- Walk-on music: "You Shook Me All Night Long" by AC/DC

Organisation (see split in darts)
- BDO: 2008–2015
- PDC: 2003–2007, 2015–2018
- WDF: 2020

WDF major events – best performances
- World Championship: Semi-final: 2014
- World Masters: Runner-up: 2009
- Int. Darts League: Preliminary Round: 2007
- Finder Masters: Runner-up: 2010

PDC premier events – best performances
- World Championship: Last 64: 2017
- World Matchplay: Last 32: 2004, 2016
- World Grand Prix: Last 32: 2016
- UK Open: Quarter-final: 2006
- Grand Slam: Last 16: 2014, 2015
- PC Finals: Quarter-final: 2016

Other tournament wins
- Tournament: Years
- Belgium Open Isle of Man Open Northern Ireland Open Scottish Open Sunparks Masters: 2012; 2014; 2010; 2011, 2014; 2011

Other achievements
- 2010 Birkenhead Open; 2012 England National Championships; 2011, 2012, 2014 Gwynedd Open; 2009 Scandinavian Masters; 2008 Wales National Championships; 2015 WDA Merseyside Open

Robbie Green (born 19 July 1974) is a former English professional darts player. His nickname was Kong.

== PDC career ==
Green made his televised debut at the 2004 UK Open, reaching the last 64 stage. The same year he qualified for the World Matchplay in Blackpool Losing in the first round to Bob Anderson. In the 2006 UK Open, he reached the quarter-finals, beating Jamie Harvey, Chris Mason, Mark Walsh and Terry Jenkins along the way. He was eventually beaten by John MaGowan.

=== Positive drug test ===
After drugs testing was introduced to the sport in 2006, after the UK Open in what was the eighth random test in the British-based organisation by agency UK Sport, Green became the first darts player to test positive for drugs. As a result of a positive test for marijuana, he was: forced to return his £4,000 prize money from the UK Open; fined £2,000; and banned from competition for eight weeks.

After his ban, during which he lost sponsorship, he returned and qualified for the International Darts League and had another UK Open campaign, but a shortage of sponsorship money forced him to play fewer tournaments during the following period.

== BDO career ==
On 22 January 2008, Green became one of only a handful of players to switch from the PDC to the rival BDO. His first tournament with the BDO was the Scottish Open on 17 February where he reached the second round. Green returned to his Merseyside roots, after a spell playing for Cheshire and now he plays county darts for Merseyside. He followed his good form with a semi-final showing in the BDO International Open, beating Martin Adams, Gary Anderson, Martin Atkins and Ted Hankey along the way, eventually losing to England Open champion Ross Montgomery of Scotland.

In 2009, Green became an international player, having been picked to play for England. He reached the 2009 Winmau World Masters final, beating 6th seed Ross Montgomery and qualifiers Connie Finnan from Ireland and Filipino Lourence Ilagan in the televised stages. In the final Green led Martin Adams, the defending champion, by six sets to three and had a dart at double 16 for the title, but was unable to convert it and subsequently lost the next six legs in succession as Adams retained his title. Green remains one of only five players, along with Mike Gregory, Ronnie Baxter, Darryl Fitton and Mervyn King, to have lost at least one major televised darts final having had a dart at double to win. Green managed to secure qualification for the World Championship, but in the first round on the Lakeside Leisure Complex stage, he lost 3–2 to number 1 seed Tony O'Shea.

Green continued his good form the following season. On 7 March 2010, Green hit a three-dart average of 128.82, which is one of the highest ever recorded. Reaching the final of the Zuiderduin Masters and once again missing championship darts before losing 5–4 in sets to Ross Montgomery, having led 4–0. Green's consistency led to him returning to Lakeside in 2011 as a seeded player. He comfortably defeated stand-by qualifier Andy Boulton 3–0 in the first round, but was defeated 4–1 in the second round by third seed Dean Winstanley.

He won the Scottish Open in 2011, defeating Clive Bardon 5–4 in the final. This success led to him becoming world #1 for a brief period.

At the 2012 BDO World Darts Championship, Green was the fourth seed. He beat Darryl Fitton 3–1 in the first round but was defeated 4-1 by Wesley Harms in the second round.

At the 2013 BDO World Darts Championship, Green was seeded fifth. He faced defending champion Christian Kist in the first round and beat him 3–1. He then defeated Scott Mitchell 4–1 in the second round to reach his first World Championship quarter-final, where he faced Tony O'Shea. Green won the first set and had eight darts at double to win the second, but missed and eventually lost the match 5-3 having never retaken the lead.

Despite winning no titles during 2013, Green had better success in the majors as he reached the semi-final of the Winmau World Masters, eliminating world champion Scott Waites before losing 6–3 to James Wilson. He followed this up with his best showing at the BDO World Championship, maintaining a 90+ tournament average in wins over Richie George (3-0), Gary Robson (4-1), and a 5–2 win over Tony Eccles in which he hit back-to-back checkouts of 125 and 164, to reach the semi-finals at Lakeside for the first time in his career, where he was defeated by top seed Stephen Bunting 1–6. He then won the Isle of Man tournament beating James Wilson in the final 5–1 with an incredible average of 114.65.

Green made his debut at the PDC's Grand Slam of Darts in 2014 and qualified as runner-up in a tough group that included Raymond van Barneveld, Robert Thornton and Vincent van der Voort. Green lost to Barneveld but defeated Thornton in his second match and then van der Voort in the crucial third match, ending with a 170 checkout in the deciding leg. Green was defeated in the next round by eventual runner-up Dave Chisnall. Green then entered the World Championship as the 16th seed but, after high-quality wins over Darius Labanauskas and Peter Sajwani, was instilled as bookmakers' favourite for the title going into his quarter-final against Jeff Smith. However, Smith defeated Green 5–1.

== PDC return ==
Green returned to the PDC after a seven-year absence in which Green worked as a cotton bud tester, in January 2015. At Qualifying School he was unable to automatically earn a place on any of the four days, but had done enough to finish inside the top 18 on the Order of Merit to earn a two-year PDC tour card. He qualified for the UK Open, but was thrashed 5–0 by Stuart Kellett in the first round. Green had to wait until September to reach his first quarter-final back on the tour which came at the 16th Players Championship, but he lost 6–2 to Jelle Klaasen. Another soon followed at the 20th event where Klaasen was again the victor, this time 6–4. Green qualified for the Grand Slam of Darts by winning five matches which included 5–1 successes over Andy Hamilton and Vincent van der Voort. A 5–1 victory over Martin Phillips in his final group fixture saw Green reach the last 16 of the event for the second year in a row. He was 4–0 down to Robert Thornton and claimed his first leg courtesy of a 170 finish. Green was also 7–3 behind and reduced the deficit to 7–6, but went on to be defeated 10–8.

Green lost 9–5 to Dirk van Duijvenbode in the third round of the 2016 UK Open. His first semi-final in the PDC came at the third Players Championship where he was beaten 6–1 by Michael van Gerwen. He didn't have to wait long for his second which came two days later at the fifth event and was ended 6–4 by Ian White. A further quarter-final finish saw Green take the last qualification spot for the World Matchplay. It was Green's first appearance at the event in 12 years and he was defeated 10–8 by Phil Taylor. He also took the final Pro Tour Order of Merit place for the World Grand Prix and won the first set against Dave Chisnall. Green threw for the match in the second set, but lost the leg and would be defeated 2–1.

Green made his PDC World Championship debut at the 2017 event, but only won two legs versus Raymond van Barneveld in a 3–0 loss. He got to his first semi-final for 12 months at the ninth Players Championship and was beaten 6–3 by Robert Thornton. Green qualified for the Grand slam, where he beat James Wade 5–1, before losing to Phil Taylor 4-5 and 3–5 to Peter Machin. "Kong" also reached the Last 32 stage of the Players Championship Finals.

He hit a 9-darter in one of the six UK Open qualifiers at the beginning of 2018. The 2018 season was not good for the man from Wallasey due to a knee injury, which had been affecting Green since he was 15 (after a football incident). He was unable to qualify for any of the Major and European tour events, thus leading to a fall in the rankings - he slid all the way to world number 77. He was unable to secure a tour card in the 2019 UK Q School. Green has not played in any professional PDC tournaments since July 2019.

== 2020 ==
His last match on the PDC circuit was a challenge tour on 26 January. He played in the Scottish open on 16 February for the WDF and that was his last darts tournament.

== Career finals ==
=== BDO major finals: 2 ===
Legend
World Masters (0–1)
Zuiderduin Masters (0–1)

| Outcome | No. | Year | Championship | Opponent in the final | Score (Note: (l) = score in legs, (s) = score in sets.) |
|---|---|---|---|---|---|
| Runner-up | 3. | 2009 | World Masters | (England) Martin Adams | 6–7 (s) |
| Runner-up | 3. | 2010 | Zuiderduin Masters | (Scotland) Ross Montgomery | 4–5 (s) |

== World Championship results ==
=== BDO ===
- 2010: First round (lost to Tony O'Shea 2–3)
- 2011: Second round (lost to Dean Winstanley 1–4)
- 2012: Second round (lost to Wesley Harms 1–4)
- 2013: Quarter-finals (lost to Tony O'Shea 3–5)
- 2014: Semi-finals (lost to Stephen Bunting 1–6)
- 2015: Quarter-finals (lost to Jeff Smith 1–5)

=== PDC ===
- 2017: First round (lost to Raymond van Barneveld 0–3)

== Performance timeline ==
=== BDO ===
| Tournament | 2008 | 2009 | 2010 | 2011 | 2012 | 2013 | 2014 | 2015 |
|---|---|---|---|---|---|---|---|---|
| World Championship | DNQ | | 1R | 2R | 2R | QF | SF | QF |
| World Masters | 5R | F | 4R | 6R | 5R | SF | 5R | PDC |
| Zuiderduin Masters | DNP | | F | RR | RR | RR | DNP | PDC |
| World Trophy | Not held | | | | | | 1R | PDC |

=== PDC ===
| Tournament | 2004 | 2006 | 2007 | 2011 | 2014 | 2015 | 2016 | 2017 |
|---|---|---|---|---|---|---|---|---|
| World Championship | Did not qualify | | | BDO | | | DNQ | 1R |
| UK Open | 3R | QF | 4R | 2R | DNQ | 1R | 3R | DNQ |
| World Matchplay | 1R | Did not qualify | | | | | 1R | DNQ |
| World Grand Prix | Did not qualify | | | | | | 1R | DNQ |
| Grand Slam | Not held | | DNQ | | 2R | 2R | DNQ | RR |
| Players Championship Finals | Not held | | | Did not qualify | | | QF | 2R |

Performance Table Legend
| W | Won the tournament | F | Finalist | SF | Semifinalist | QF | Quarterfinalist | #R; RR; Prel. | Lost in # round Round-robin; Preliminary round | DQ | Disqualified |
| DNQ | Did not qualify | DNP | Did not participate | WD | Withdrew | NH | Tournament not held | #R; RR; Prel. | Lost in # round Round-robin; Preliminary round | NYF | Not yet founded |

== See also ==
- List of darts players who have switched organisation
