= 2011 Zuiderduin Masters =

Zuiderduin Masters

Tournament information
- Dates: 9 December 2011 – 11 December 2011
- Venue: Hotel Zuiderduin
- Location: Egmond aan Zee
- Country: North Holland, the Netherlands
- Organisation(s): BDO / WDF
- Format: Men; Legs (group stage); Sets (from Quarter-finals); Final – best of 9 Sets; Women; Legs (group stage); Sets (Final); Final – best of 3 Sets
- High checkout: 170 (Netherlands) Jan Dekker

Champion(s)
- (England) Scott Waites (men) (England) Deta Hedman (women)

The 2011 Zuiderduin Masters was a British Darts Organisation darts tournament that took place in Egmond aan Zee, Netherlands. It was the 13th staging of the event, and the last tournament to be staged that year. Scott Waites was in blistering form as he won the tournament for the first time, beating Martin Adams to get to the final in a sudden-death leg with a 105.12 average. Darryl Fitton was his opponent in the final, and missed two match darts for a 5–3 victory and his second Zuiderduin Masters win. Waites missed the double 18 for a nine-dart finish on his way to completing the comeback. It was a very high scoring match, with Waites hitting 16 180s and Fitton hitting 15.

== Qualifying ==
The players in bold are the seeded players for the group stages. The players in italics qualified through more than one method.

=== Men ===
Qualifying Criteria		Player	Ref
2010-11 Zuiderduin Masters; Rankings – Top 16	1	(England) **Dean Winstanley**	
2010-11 Zuiderduin Masters; Rankings – Top 16	2	(England) **Gary Robson**	
2010-11 Zuiderduin Masters; Rankings – Top 16	3	(England) **Robbie Green**	
2010-11 Zuiderduin Masters; Rankings – Top 16	4	(Netherlands) **Willy van de Wiel**	
2010-11 Zuiderduin Masters; Rankings – Top 16	5	(England) **John Walton**	
2010-11 Zuiderduin Masters; Rankings – Top 16	6	(England) **Tony O'Shea**	
2010-11 Zuiderduin Masters; Rankings – Top 16	7	(England) **Tony West**	
2010-11 Zuiderduin Masters; Rankings – Top 16	8	(Scotland) **Ross Montgomery**	
2010-11 Zuiderduin Masters; Rankings – Top 16	9	(England) Alan Norris	
2010-11 Zuiderduin Masters; Rankings – Top 16	10	(Netherlands) Jan Dekker	
2010-11 Zuiderduin Masters; Rankings – Top 16	11	(England) Scott Mitchell	
2010-11 Zuiderduin Masters; Rankings – Top 16	12	(England) Steve Douglas	
2010-11 Zuiderduin Masters; Rankings – Top 16	13	(Netherlands) Fabian Roosenbrand	
2010-11 Zuiderduin Masters; Rankings – Top 16	14	(England) Martin Adams	
2010-11 Zuiderduin Masters; Rankings – Top 16	15	(Netherlands) Joey ten Berge	
2010-11 Zuiderduin Masters; Rankings – Top 16	16	(Netherlands) Benito van de Pas	
2011 MariFlex Open winner		(Netherlands) Jan Dekker	
2011 NDB Champions League of Darts winner		(Netherlands) Edwin Max	
2011 NDB Rankings winner		(Netherlands) Remon Hurrebrink	
2011 NDB Selection winner		(Netherlands) Salmon Renyaan	
Wildcards		(England) Darryl Fitton	
Wildcards		(Netherlands) Christian Kist	
Wildcards		(Netherlands) Wesley Harms	
Wildcards		(England) Scott Waites	
Wildcards		(Belgium) Geert De Vos	
Notes; Jan Dekker qualified through Zuiderduin Masters Rankings and won 2013 MariFlex; Open so an extra wildcard was awarded.

=== Women ===
Qualifying Criteria		Player	Ref
2010-11 Zuiderduin Masters; Rankings – Top 2	1	(England) **Deta Hedman**	
2010-11 Zuiderduin Masters; Rankings – Top 2	2	(Russia) **Irina Armstrong**	
2011 MariFlex Open winner		(Russia) Anastasia Dobromyslova	
2011 NDB Champions League of Darts winner		(Netherlands) Tamara Schuur	
Wildcards		(England) Trina Gulliver	
Wildcards		(Netherlands) Aileen de Graaf	

== Results ==
=== Men's tournament ===
==== Group stage ====
All matches best of 9 legs. Two points are gained for every match won.
P = Played; W = Won; L = Lost; LF = Legs for; LA = Legs against; +/− = Leg difference; Pts = Points

Group A

Pos	Name	P	W	L	LF	LA	+/−	Pts
1	(England) Dean Winstanley (1)	2	2	0	10	7	+3	4
2	(England) Steve Douglas	2	1	1	9	8	+1	2
3	(Netherlands) Wesley Harms	2	0	2	6	10	−4	0

Steve Douglas 90.18 5–3 Wesley Harms 92.31

Dean Winstanley 84.15 5–3 Wesley Harms 76.56

Dean Winstanley 89.40 5–4 Steve Douglas 85.50

Group B

Pos	Name	P	W	L	LF	LA	+/−	Pts
1	(Scotland) Ross Montgomery (8)	2	2	0	10	5	+5	4
2	(Netherlands) Fabian Roosenbrand	2	1	1	7	6	+1	2
3	(Netherlands) Christian Kist	2	0	2	4	10	−6	0

Fabian Roosenbrand 88.95 5–1 Christian Kist 83.70

Ross Montgomery 99.87 5–3 Christian Kist 92.49

Ross Montgomery 94.89 5–2 Fabian Roosenbrand 89.79

Group C

Pos	Name	P	W	L	LF	LA	+/−	Pts
1	(England) Darryl Fitton	2	2	0	10	7	+3	4
2	(England) John Walton (5)	2	1	1	9	8	+1	2
3	(Netherlands) Salmon Renyaan	2	0	2	6	10	−4	0

Darryl Fitton 96.78 5–3 Salmon Renyaan 83.55

John Walton 82.98 5–3 Salmon Renyaan 78.39

Darryl Fitton 94.11 5–4 John Walton 88.11

Group D

Pos	Name	P	W	L	LF	LA	+/−	Pts
1	(Netherlands) Joey ten Berge	2	1	1	9	8	+1	2 *
2	(Netherlands) Willy van de Wiel (4)	2	1	1	8	7	+1	2
3	(Netherlands) Edwin Max	2	1	1	7	9	−2	2

Edwin Max 87.15 5–4 Joey ten Berge 90.45

Joey ten Berge 81.18 5–3 Willy van de Wiel 78.90

Willy van de Wiel 85.38 5–2 Edwin Max 79.68

- * If leg difference does not separate players, the player with the most legs won goes through.

Group E

Pos	Name	P	W	L	LF	LA	+/−	Pts
1	(England) Scott Mitchell	2	2	0	10	3	+7	4
2	(England) Robbie Green (3)	2	1	1	6	6	0	2
3	(Netherlands) Remon Hurrebrink	2	0	2	3	10	−7	0

Scott Mitchell 78.69 5–2 Remon Hurrebrink 74.49

Robbie Green 87.27 5–1 Remon Hurrebrink 83.01

Scott Mitchell 94.77 5–1 Robbie Green 85.14

Group F

Pos	Name	P	W	L	LF	LA	+/−	Pts
1	(England) Martin Adams	2	2	0	10	4	+6	4
2	(England) Alan Norris	2	1	1	7	8	−1	2
3	(England) Tony O'Shea (6)	2	0	2	5	10	−5	0

Martin Adams 94.32 5–2 Alan Norris 94.23

Alan Norris 101.52 5–3 Tony O'Shea 89.55

Martin Adams 91.53 5–2 Tony O'Shea 91.80

Group G

Pos	Name	P	W	L	LF	LA	+/−	Pts
1	(Netherlands) Jan Dekker	2	2	0	10	4	+6	4
2	(Netherlands) Benito van de Pas	2	1	1	8	9	−1	2
3	(England) Tony West (7)	2	0	2	5	10	−5	0

Jan Dekker 87.78 5–3 Benito van de Pas 79.50

Benito van de Pas 83.01 5–4 Tony West 85.71

Jan Dekker 85.68 5–1 Tony West 72.45

Group H

Pos	Name	P	W	L	LF	LA	+/−	Pts
1	(England) Scott Waites	2	2	0	10	5	+5	4
2	(Belgium) Geert De Vos	2	1	1	8	7	+1	2
3	(England) Gary Robson (2)	2	0	2	4	10	−6	0

Scott Waites 99.15 5–3 Geert De Vos 85.71

Geert De Vos 93.60 5–2 Gary Robson 88.95

Scott Waites 86.55 5–2 Gary Robson 79.83

==== Knockout stages ====
Quarter-finals; Best of 5 sets
B	(Scotland) Ross Montgomery 88.38	3
A	(England) Dean Winstanley 88.80	2
C	(England) Darryl Fitton 93.15	3
D	(Netherlands) Joey ten Berge 86.25	2
F	(England) Martin Adams 87.93	3
E	(England) Scott Mitchell 87.09	2
H	(England) Scott Waites 96.00	3
G	(Netherlands) Jan Dekker 87.81	1

Semi-finals; Best of 5 sets
(Scotland) Ross Montgomery 85.62	1
(England) Darryl Fitton 93.18	3
(England) Martin Adams 99.78	2
(England) Scott Waites 105.12	3

Final; Best of 9 sets
(England) Darryl Fitton 97.71	4
2	(England) Scott Waites 99.96	5

=== Women's tournament ===
==== Group stage ====
All matches best of 7 legs. Two points are gained for every match won.
P = Played; W = Won; L = Lost; LF = Legs for; LA = Legs against; +/− = Leg difference; Pts = Points

Group A

Pos	Name	P	W	L	LF	LA	+/−	Pts
1	(England) (1) Deta Hedman	2	2	0	8	4	+4	4
2	(Russia) Anastasia Dobromyslova	2	1	1	5	6	−1	2
3	(England) Trina Gulliver	2	0	2	5	8	−3	0

Anastasia Dobromyslova 4–2 Trina Gulliver

Deta Hedman (1) 4–3 Trina Gulliver

Deta Hedman (1) 4–1 Anastasia Dobromyslova

Group B

Pos	Name	P	W	L	LF	LA	+/−	Pts
1	(Netherlands) Aileen de Graaf	2	2	0	8	3	+5	4
2	(Netherlands) Tamara Schuur	2	1	1	6	7	−1	2
3	(Russia) (2) Irina Armstrong	2	0	2	4	8	−4	0

Aileen de Graaf 4–2 Tamara Schuur

Tamara Schuur 4–3 Irina Armstrong (2)

Aileen de Graaf 4–1 Irina Armstrong (2)

==== Final ====
Best of 3 sets.

(England) Deta Hedman (81.99) 2–0 (Netherlands) Aileen de Graaf (68.25)
