= Michel van der Horst =

Dutch darts player (born 1975)

Personal information
- Nickname: "The Invisible Man"
- Born: 8 April 1975 (age 51) Deventer, Netherlands

Sport
- Sport: Darts
- Playing since: 1997
- Darts: Grand Slam Signature
- Laterality: Right-handed
- Walk-on music: "The Invisible Man" by Queen

Organisation (see split in darts)
- BDO: 2009–2016, 2017–
- PDC: 2016–2017

WDF major events – best performances
- World Championship: Last 32: 2015
- World Masters: Last 40: 2009
- Finder Masters: Quarter-Final: 2013, 2014

PDC premier events – best performances
- Grand Slam: Group Stages: 2015

Michel van der Horst (born 8 April 1975) is a Dutch professional darts player who plays in British Darts Organisation (BDO) events.

== Career ==
Van der Horst qualified for the 2015 BDO World Championship and played David Cameron of Canada in the preliminary round winning 3–2 in sets, but was beaten 3–1 by Jamie Hughes in the first round. He qualified for the 2015 Grand Slam of Darts, but lost each of his games against James Wade, Keegan Brown and Mark Webster to finish bottom of Group F.

Van der Horst switched to the PDC in 2016 and played in his first European Tour event at the European Darts Matchplay and recovered from 4–1 down to Rowby-John Rodriguez in the first round to level at 4–4, but was beaten 6–4.

== World Championship results ==
=== BDO ===
- 2015: First round (lost to Jamie Hughes 1–3)
