= 2004 World Matchplay =

2004 Stan James World Matchplay

Tournament information
- Dates: 25–31 July 2004
- Venue: Winter Gardens
- Location: Blackpool, England
- Organisation(s): Professional Darts Corporation (PDC)
- Format: Legs
- Prize fund: £100,000
- Winner's share: £20,000
- High checkout: 170 Denis Ovens

Champion(s)
- Phil Taylor (ENG)

The 2004 Stan James World Matchplay was held between 25–31 July 2004 at the Winter Gardens, Blackpool, and was won for the fifth year in a row by Phil Taylor.

== Prize money ==
The prize fund was £100,000.

Position (no. of players)		Prize money (Total: £100,000)
Winner	(1)	£20,000
Runner-Up	(1)	£10,000
Semi-finalists	(2)	£6,000
Quarter-finalists	(4)	£4,000
Second round	(8)	£2,250
First round	(16)	£1,500

== Seeds ==
The tournament featured sixteen seeds.

1. (Canada) John Part
2. (Netherlands) Roland Scholten
3. (England) Peter Manley
4. (England) Phil Taylor
5. (England) Colin Lloyd
6. (England) Wayne Mardle
7. (England) Kevin Painter
8. (England) Dennis Smith
9. (England) Andy Jenkins
10. (England) Ronnie Baxter
11. (England) Alan Warriner
12. (England) Denis Ovens
13. (England) Steve Beaton
14. (England) Dennis Priestley
15. (England) Dave Askew
16. (England) Bob Anderson

== Results ==
Players in bold denote match winners.

**First round** (best of 19 legs); 25–27 July
1	(Canada) **John Part** 90.54	**10**
(England) Colin Monk 59.96	0
16	(England) **Bob Anderson** 87.18	**10**
(England) Robbie Green 89.86	7
8	(England) **Dennis Smith** 90.34	**10**
(England) Keith Deller 79.99	4
9	(England) **Andy Jenkins** 94.46	**10**
(England) John Lowe 88.83	6
5	(England) **Colin Lloyd** 83.93	**10**
(England) Dave Smith 80.28	6
12	(England) **Denis Ovens** 92.60	**10**
(England) Mark Walsh 89.89	5
4	(England) **Phil Taylor** 109.42	**10**
(England) Alex Roy 86.45	1
13	(England) **Steve Beaton** 86.84	**10**
(England) Paul Williams 80.01	7
2	(Netherlands) **Roland Scholten** 81.17	**10**
(Wales) Richie Burnett 83.08	7
15	(England) Dave Askew 83.05	7
(Scotland) **Jamie Harvey** 80.06	**10**
7	(England) **Kevin Painter** 88.63	**12**
(England) Lionel Sams 83.14	10
10	(England) **Ronnie Baxter** 91.65	**10**
(England) Peter Evison 79.18	0
6	(England) Wayne Mardle 92.87	5
(England) **Mark Dudbridge** 94.84	**10**
11	(England) **Alan Warriner** 88.11	**10**
(England) Simon Whatley 79.78	3
3	(England) **Peter Manley** 87.10	**10**
(England) Dave Jowett 77.53	4
14	(England) **Dennis Priestley** 83.44	**10**
(England) Alan Caves 81.79	5

**Second round** (best of 25 legs); 27–28 July
1	(Canada) **John Part** 86.85	**17**
16	(England) Bob Anderson 85.25	15
8	(England) Dennis Smith 84.41	15
9	(England) **Andy Jenkins** 84.32	**17**
5	(England) **Colin Lloyd** 89.38	**13**
12	(England) Denis Ovens 87.95	7
4	(England) **Phil Taylor** 96.07	**13**
13	(England) Steve Beaton 85.35	4
2	(Netherlands) Roland Scholten 87.57	16
(Scotland) **Jamie Harvey** 86.64	**18**
7	(England) Kevin Painter 89.38	17
10	(England) **Ronnie Baxter** 92.16	**19**
(England) **Mark Dudbridge** 87.61	**15**
11	(England) Alan Warriner 84.90	13
3	(England) **Peter Manley** 83.64	**13**
14	(England) Dennis Priestley 80.84	9

**Quarter-finals** (best of 31 legs); 29 July
1	(Canada) **John Part** 91.61	**16**
9	(England) Andy Jenkins 84.13	14
5	(England) Colin Lloyd 96.05	10
4	(England) **Phil Taylor** 105.56	**16**
(Scotland) Jamie Harvey 83.89	4
10	(England) **Ronnie Baxter** 87.97	**16**
(England) **Mark Dudbridge** 89.40	**16**
3	(England) Peter Manley 88.20	9

**Semi-finals** (best of 33 legs); 30 July
1	(Canada) John Part 92.42	8
4	(England) **Phil Taylor** 98.42	**17**
10	(England) Ronnie Baxter 94.31	13
(England) **Mark Dudbridge** 95.91	**17**

**Final** (best of 35 legs); 31 July
4	(England) **Phil Taylor** 100.12	**18**
(England) Mark Dudbridge 89.24	8
