= 2010 Zuiderduin Masters =

Zuiderduin Masters

Tournament information
- Dates: 10 December 2010 – 12 December 2010
- Venue: Hotel Zuiderduin
- Location: Egmond aan Zee
- Country: North Holland, the Netherlands
- Organisation(s): BDO / WDF
- Format: Men; Legs (group stage); Sets (from quarter-finals); Final – best of 9 Sets; Women; Legs (from quarter-finals); Sets (final); Final – best of 3 Sets

Champion(s)
- (Scotland) Ross Montgomery (men) (England) Trina Gulliver (women)

The 2010 Zuiderduin Masters was a BDO/WDF darts tournament that took place in Egmond aan Zee, Netherlands.

Ross Montgomery won the men's title, beating Robbie Green 5-4 in sets having been 4-0 down.

== Qualifying ==
The players in bold are the seeded players for the group stages in the men's event and the knockout stages in the women's event. Steve West and Deta Hedman (in italics) qualified through more than one method.

=== Men ===
Qualifying Criteria		Player	Ref
Zuiderduin Masters Rankings - Top 16	1	(Scotland) **Ross Montgomery**	
Zuiderduin Masters Rankings - Top 16	2	(England) **Martin Adams**	
Zuiderduin Masters Rankings - Top 16	3	(England) **Steve West**	
Zuiderduin Masters Rankings - Top 16	4	(England) **Garry Thompson**	
Zuiderduin Masters Rankings - Top 16	4	(England) **Alan Norris**	
Zuiderduin Masters Rankings - Top 16	6	(England) **Darryl Fitton**	
Zuiderduin Masters Rankings - Top 16	7	(England) **Dean Winstanley**	
Zuiderduin Masters Rankings - Top 16	8	(England) **Scott Mitchell**	
Zuiderduin Masters Rankings - Top 16	9	(England) Gary Robson	
Zuiderduin Masters Rankings - Top 16	10	(England) Stuart Kellet	
Zuiderduin Masters Rankings - Top 16	11	(England) Scott Waites	
Zuiderduin Masters Rankings - Top 16	12	(Netherlands) Dave Prins	
Zuiderduin Masters Rankings - Top 16	13	(England) Robbie Green	
Zuiderduin Masters Rankings - Top 16	13	(England) Tony West	
Zuiderduin Masters Rankings - Top 16	15	(England) Steve Douglas	
Zuiderduin Masters Rankings - Top 16	16	(Netherlands) Joey ten Berge	
IDTL Rankings - Top 4	1	(England) **Steve West**	
IDTL Rankings - Top 4	2	(Scotland) John Henderson	
IDTL Rankings - Top 4	3	(England) John Walton	
IDTL Rankings - Top 4	4	(Netherlands) Gino Vos	
2010 NDB Champions League of Darts winner		(Netherlands) Wesley Harms	
Wildcards		(England) Tony O'Shea	
Wildcards		(Netherlands) Willy van de Wiel	
Wildcards		(Netherlands) Jan Dekker	
Wildcards		(England) Ted Hankey	
Notes; Steve West qualified through Zuiderduin Masters Rankings and finished 1st on IDTL Rankings so an extra wildcard was awarded.

=== Women ===
Qualifying Criteria		Player	Ref
Zuiderduin Masters Rankings - Top 5	1	(England) **Deta Hedman**	
Zuiderduin Masters Rankings - Top 5	2	(Russia) **Irina Armstrong**	
Zuiderduin Masters Rankings - Top 5	3	(England) **Dee Bateman**	
Zuiderduin Masters Rankings - Top 5	4	(England) **Karen Lawman**	
Zuiderduin Masters Rankings - Top 5	5	(England) Trina Gulliver	
IDTL Rankings - No. 1	1	(England) **Deta Hedman**	
2010 NDB Champions League of Darts winner		(Netherlands) Sharon Prins	
Wildcards		(Netherlands) Karin Krappen	
Wildcards		(Netherlands) Francis Hoenselaar	
Notes; Deta Hedman finished 1st on Zuiderduin Masters Rankings and 1st on IDTL; Rankings so an extra wildcard was awarded

== Results ==
=== Men's tournament ===
==== Group stage ====
All matches best of 9 legs. Two points are gained for every match won.
P = Played; W = Won; L = Lost; LF = Legs for; LA = Legs against; +/- = Leg difference; Pts = Points

Group A

Pos	Name	P	W	L	LF	LA	+/-	Pts
1	(Scotland) Ross Montgomery (1)	2	2	0	10	5	+5	4
2	(England) Tony West	2	1	1	9	7	+2	2
3	(Scotland) John Henderson	2	0	2	3	10	-7	0

Tony West 5-3 John Henderson

Ross Montgomery (1) 5-3 John Henderson

Ross Montgomery (1) 5-2 Tony West

Group B

Pos	Name	P	W	L	LF	LA	+/-	Pts
1	(England) Stuart Kellett	2	2	0	10	5	+5	4
2	(England) Scott Mitchell (8)	2	1	1	8	8	0	2
3	(Netherlands) Gino Vos	2	0	2	5	10	-5	0

Stuart Kellett 5-3 Gino Vos

Scott Mitchell (8) 5-2 Gino Vos

Stuart Kellett 5-3 Scott Mitchell (8)

Group C

Pos	Name	P	W	L	LF	LA	+/-	Pts
1	(England) Tony O'Shea	2	2	0	10	6	+4	4
2	(England) Alan Norris	2	1	1	7	6	+1	2
3	(England) John Walton (5)	2	0	2	5	10	-5	0

Tony O'Shea 5-4 John Walton

Alan Norris (5) 5-4 John Walton

Tony O'Shea 5-0 Alan Norris (5)

Group D

Pos	Name	P	W	L	LF	LA	+/-	Pts
1	(England) Ted Hankey	2	2	0	10	5	+5	4
2	(England) Garry Thompson (4)	2	1	1	9	8	+1	2
3	(Netherlands) Joey ten Berge	2	0	0	4	10	-6	0

Ted Hankey 5-0 Joey ten Berge

Joey ten Berge 5-3 Garry Thompson (4)

Garry Thompson (4) 5-4 Ted Hankey

Group E

Pos	Name	P	W	L	LF	LA	+/-	Pts
1	(England) Gary Robson	2	2	0	10	5	+5	4
2	(England) Steve West (3)	2	1	1	7	9	-2	2
3	(Netherlands) Willy van de Wiel	2	0	2	7	10	-3	0

Gary Robson 5-4 Willy van de Wiel

Steve West (3) 5-4 Willy van de Wiel

Gary Robson 5-2 Steve West (3)

Group F

Pos	Name	P	W	L	LF	LA	+/-	Pts
1	(England) Robbie Green	2	2	0	10	4	+6	4
2	(England) Steve Douglas	2	1	1	8	7	+1	2
3	(England) Darryl Fitton (6)	2	0	2	3	10	-7	0

Robbie Green 5-3 Steve Douglas

Steve Douglas 5-1 Darryl Fitton (6)

Robbie Green 5-3 Darryl Fitton (6)

Group G

Pos	Name	P	W	L	LF	LA	+/-	Pts
1	(England) Dean Winstanley (7)	2	2	0	10	4	+6	4
2	(England) Scott Waites	2	1	1	8	9	-1	2
3	(England) Dave Prins	2	0	2	5	10	-5	0

Scott Waites 5-3 Dave Prins

Dean Winstanley (7) 5-2 Dave Prins

Dean Winstanley (7) 5-0 Scott Waites

Group H

Pos	Name	P	W	L	LF	LA	+/-	Pts
1	(England) Martin Adams (2)	2	2	0	10	4	+6	4
2	(Netherlands) Wesley Harms	2	1	1	7	7	0	2
3	(Netherlands) Jan Dekker	2	0	2	4	10	-6	0

Wesley Harms 5-3 Jan Dekker

Martin Adams (2) 5-1 Jan Dekker

Martin Adams (2) 5-1 Wesley Harms

==== Knockout stages ====
Quarter-Finals; Best of 5 sets
1	(Scotland) Ross Montgomery	3
(England) Stuart Kellett	2
(England) Tony O'Shea	3
(England) Ted Hankey	0
2	(England) Martin Adams	3
(England) Dean Winstanley	0
(England) Robbie Green	3
(England) Gary Robson	0

Semi-Finals; Best of 5 sets
1	(Scotland) Ross Montgomery	3
(England) Tony O'Shea	2
2	(England) Martin Adams	3
(England) Robbie Green	1

Final; Best of 9 sets
1	(Scotland) Ross Montgomery	5
(England) Robbie Green	4

=== Women's tournament ===
Quarter-Finals; Best of 7 legs
(England) Trina Gulliver	4
3	(England) Dee Bateman	3
(Netherlands) Karin Krappen	4
2	(Russia) Irina Armstrong	3
(Netherlands) Francis Hoenselaar	4
4	(England) Karen Lawman	0
1	(England) Deta Hedman	4
(Netherlands) Sharon Prins	0

Semi-Finals; Best of 7 legs
(England) Trina Gulliver	4
(Netherlands) Karin Krappen	2
(Netherlands) Francis Hoenselaar	4
1	(England) Deta Hedman	2

Final; Best of 3 sets
(England) Trina Gulliver	2
(Netherlands) Francis Hoenselaar	1
