= Scott Mitchell (darts player) =

English darts player (born 1970)

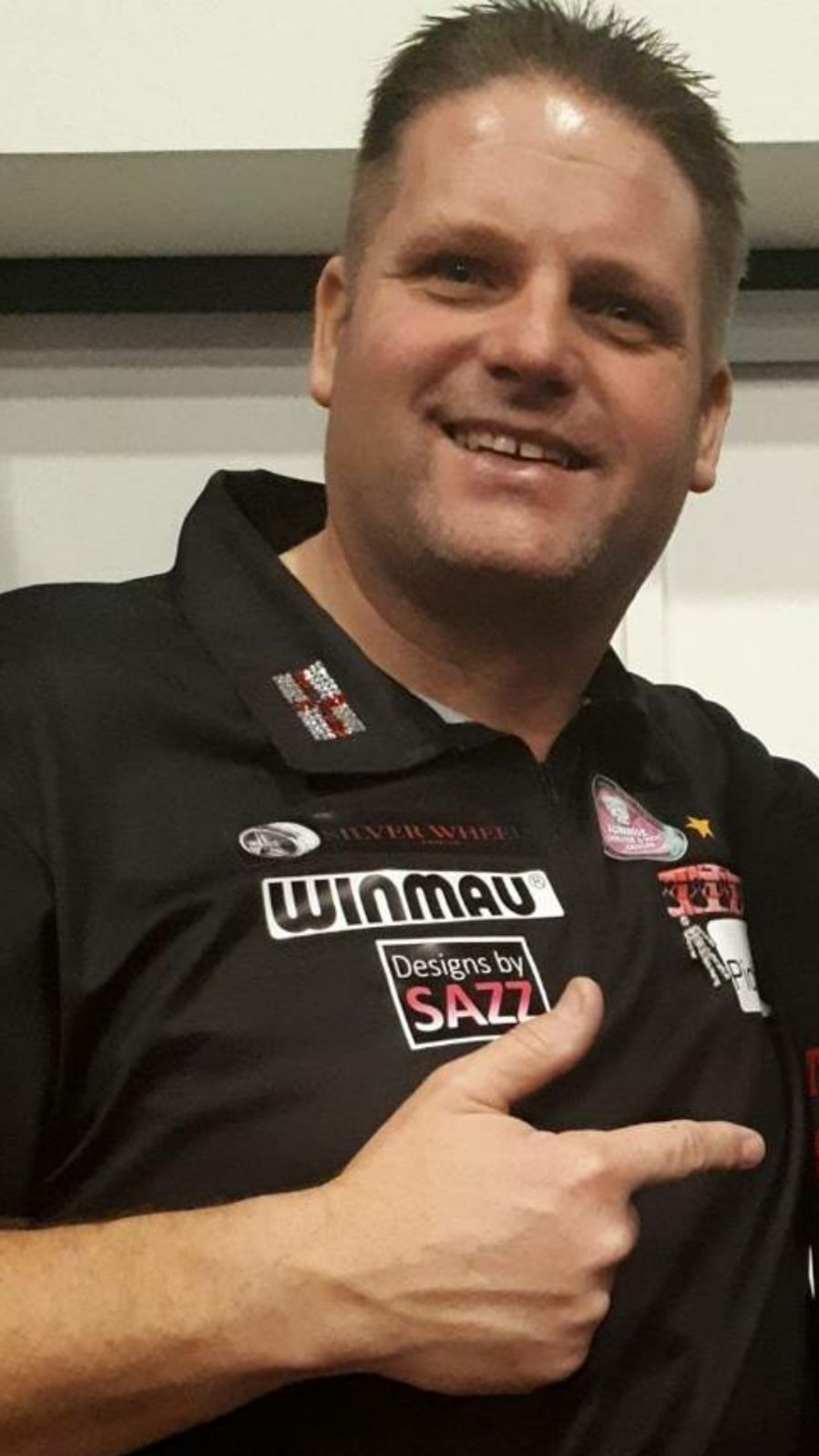
- Mitchell in 2018

Personal information
- Nickname: "Scotty Dog"
- Born: 5 June 1970 (age 56) Bournemouth, England
- Home town: Bransgore, England

Sport
- Sport: Darts
- Playing since: 1986
- Darts: 24g Winmau Signature
- Laterality: Right Handed
- Walk-on music: "Who Let the Dogs Out" by Baha Men

Organisation (see split in darts)
- BDO: 2007–2020
- PDC: 2020–

WDF major events – best performances
- World Championship: Winner (1): 2015
- World Masters: Semi-final: 2016, 2018
- World Trophy: Quarter-final: 2014
- Finder Masters: Semi-final: 2012, 2016, 2017

PDC premier events – best performances
- World Championship: Last 96: 2022
- UK Open: Last 64: 2021, 2024
- Grand Slam: Group Stage: 2015, 2016, 2017, 2018
- PC Finals: Last 32: 2021

WSDT major events – best performances
- World Championship: Last 16: 2023, 2024

Other tournament wins
- Tournament: Years
- BDO Gold Cup Belfry Open British Open Czech Open Denmark Masters Denmark Open England Classic England Masters England Matchplay England National Ch'ships French Open German Open Hampshire Open International Open Vizcaya Isle of Man Classic Jersey Open Muensterland Classic PDC Challenge Tour Romanian Classic Sunparks Masters Swedish Open Swiss Open Tops of Ghent Welsh Open WDF Europe Cup Pairs WDF Europe Cup Team WDF World Cup Team: 2018; 2017; 2014; 2017; 2018; 2017; 2009; 2015, 2019; 2014, 2019; 2017, 2018; 2013; 2018; 2013; 2018; 2016; 2014, 2015; 2014; 2020; 2014; 2010, 2013; 2017; 2009, 2010; 2014; 2016; 2014, 2018; 2016; 2015
Medal record
Men's Darts
Representing England
WDF Europe Cup
Gold medal – first place	2018 Budapest	Men's pairs
Gold medal – first place	2018 Budapest	Men's overall
Silver medal – second place	2024 Šamorín	Men's pairs
Bronze medal – third place	2024 Šamorín	Men's overall

Scott Mitchell (born 5 June 1970) is an English professional darts player who competes in Professional Darts Corporation (PDC) events. He formerly competed in British Darts Organisation (BDO) and World Darts Federation (WDF) tournaments. He is a former BDO World Champion, having won the 2015 World Championship. He is a two-time World Masters semi-finalist.

He also won a title on the PDC Challenge Tour, in 2020.

== Darts career ==
=== Early career ===
Before he made his mark in the BDO, Mitchell qualified for the 2007 UK Open, winning his first round match 8–4 against Brian Cathcart before losing out in the second round to 2006 Lakeside World champion Jelle Klaasen.

Mitchell won the England Classic and Swiss Open in 2009 which helped him qualify for the 2010 BDO World Championship as the 14th seed. However, he lost in the first round 3–2 to Daryl Gurney. Mitchell retained his Swiss Open title in 2010 and also won the Center Parcs Masters, and qualified for 2011 BDO World Championship as the 15th seed, however he was beaten in the first round 3–0 by Jan Dekker.

Mitchell was once again beaten in the first round at Lakeside in 2012, losing to defending champion Martin Adams who won the match 3–0. A year later, Mitchell played Mark Barilli, winning 3–2, but in the next round, Mitchell was beaten by Robbie Green 4–1.

=== 2014 – Breakthrough year ===
Mitchell started 2014 at Lakeside again reaching the second round for the second year running by beating Paul Hogan 3–2 in the first round. He was beaten by second seed James Wilson 4–2.

2014 was hugely successful for Mitchell. He won a host of tournaments including several that were televised on Eurosport namely Top of Ghent in Belgium and the Jersey Open. As well as being part of the England team that won the WDF Europe Cup – where Mitchell won the decisive leg in the final, Mitchell won the prestigious British Open. He also reached the quarter-finals of the Winmau World Masters. After missing four match darts he lost 3–2 to Glen Durrant, who Mitchell beat in the Jersey Open final.

=== 2015 – World Champion ===
Mitchell's 2014 form saw him enter the world's top four and eventually culminated in him winning the 2015 World Championship. He defeated Tony O'Shea in a sudden death leg after going two sets each and 5–5 in legs. Mitchell then met Geert De Vos from Belgium in the last 16, it was a close fought match in the first four sets being two each with Mitchell taking the fifth set. With the score 2–1 in legs in the sixth set, De Vos missed double 5 to stay alive in the match and Mitchell hit double 20 to edge out De Vos 4–2 and progress through to the last 8. Brian Dawson was Mitchell's opponent in the quarter-finals, "Scotty Dog" winning 5–2. Mitchell beat Jeff Smith 6–0 in the semi-final. In the final Mitchell played three-time winner Martin Adams, and won 7–6.

As a result of winning the tournament Mitchell reached number one in the BDO Men's ranking.

=== PDC ===
He started competing in the Professional Darts Corporation at the start of 2020. After winning one of the first Challenge Tour events, Mitchell was invited to compete on the Players Championship circuit in 2020.

On 17 February 2021, he won a two-year PDC Tour Card at UK Qualifying School.

He lost his card at the end of 2022 after not qualifying for the World Championship, finishing 70th on the Order of Merit.

== Personal life ==
Mitchell still works full-time on the family farm in rural Dorset and as a freelance landscape gardener. He has been married to Sharon (born 1969) since 1991 and together they have two children.

He is also a fan of speedway team Poole Pirates, and has their logo on his left sleeve.

== Outside darts ==
Although Mitchell has played darts competitively from a young age, Scott has had other sporting interests that fitted in with his dart life. He has represented his secondary school in both basketball and football. On reaching 18 years old, Scott applied for his Amateur MotorCycling Association racing licence, and raced motocross competitively for the Christchurch and district A.M.C.A. club from 1988 to 1995. On retiring from motocross, Scott went back to football, playing for his local teams Burley F.C., but mostly for the "Badgers", Bransgore F.C., from 1995 to 2006, winning most-improved player in 2002, and later becoming the team's manager. It was after then that Scott's darts career started to take off, and football had to take a "back seat". He supports his local side, A.F.C. Bournemouth.

== World Championship Performances ==
=== BDO ===
- 2010: First round (lost to Daryl Gurney 2–3)
- 2011: First round (lost to Jan Dekker 0–3)
- 2012: First round (lost to Martin Adams 0–3)
- 2013: Second round (lost to Robbie Green 1–4)
- 2014: Second round (lost to James Wilson 2–4)
- 2015: Winner (beat Martin Adams 7–6)
- 2016: Quarter-finals (lost to Richard Veenstra 3–5)
- 2017: Second round (lost to Geert De Vos 2–4)
- 2018: Second round (lost to Andy Baetens 2–4)
- 2019: Quarter-finals (lost to Jim Williams 3–5)
- 2020: Semi-finals (lost to Wayne Warren 3–6)

=== PDC ===
- 2022: First round (lost to Chris Landman 0–3)

=== WSDT ===
- 2023: Second round (lost to Robert Thornton 0–3)
- 2024: Second round (lost to Lisa Ashton 0–3)

== Career finals ==
=== BDO major finals: 1 (1 title) ===
Outcome	No.	Year	Championship	Opponent in the final	Score (Note: (l) = score in legs, (s) = score in sets.)
Winner	1.	2015	World Championship	(England) Martin Adams	7–6 (s)

== Performance timeline ==
Mitchell's performance timeline is as follows:

=== BDO ===
Tournament	2007	2008	2009	2010	2011	2012	2013	2014	2015	2016	2017	2018	2019	2020
BDO Ranked televised events
World Championship	DNQ			1R	1R	1R	2R	2R	W	QF	2R	2R	QF	SF
World Trophy	Not held							QF	2R	2R	2R	2R	2R	NH
World Masters	5R	4R	3R	3R	3R	6R	2R	QF	5R	SF	5R	SF	4R	NH
Finder Darts Masters	DNQ			RR	QF	SF	RR	RR	RR	SF	SF	QF	NH	
Career statistics
Year-end ranking	320	44	14	6	12	7	11	1	5	4	4	4	21	

=== WSD ===
Tournament	2023	2024
WSD Televised events
World Championship	2R	2R
World Matchplay	1R	DNP

=== PDC ===
Tournament	2015	2016	2017	2018	2021	2022	2024
PDC Ranked televised events
World Championship	BDO				DNQ	1R	DNQ
UK Open	BDO				4R	2R	4R
Grand Slam	RR	RR	RR	RR	DNQ		
Players Championship Finals	BDO				2R	DNQ	
Career statistics
Season-end ranking (PDC)	Not ranked				75	70	190

==== European Tour ====
Tournament	2023
Hungarian Trophy	2R

==== Players Championships ====
Season	1	2	3	4	5	6	7	8	9	10	11	12	13	14	15	16	17	18	19	20	21	22	23	24	25	26	27	28	29	30
2020 (Note: Not a Tour card holder)	BAR; 1R	BAR; DNP	WIG; 2R	WIG; 2R	WIG; 3R	WIG; 3R	BAR; 1R	BAR; 3R	MIL; 1R	MIL; 2R	MIL; 3R	MIL; 1R	MIL; 2R	NIE; 2R	NIE; 1R	NIE; 1R	NIE; 1R	NIE; 3R	COV; 1R	COV; 2R	COV; 2R	COV; 1R	COV; 1R							
2021	BOL; 2R	BOL; 1R	BOL; 2R	BOL; 1R	MIL; QF	MIL; 4R	MIL; 4R	MIL; 3R	NIE; 2R	NIE; 1R	NIE; QF	NIE; QF	MIL; 1R	MIL; 4R	MIL; 1R	MIL; 1R	COV; 3R	COV; QF	COV; 3R	COV; 2R	BAR; 1R	BAR; 3R	BAR; 3R	BAR; 2R	BAR; 2R	BAR; 1R	BAR; 3R	BAR; 2R	BAR; 1R	BAR; 2R
2022	BAR; 1R	BAR; 1R	WIG; 2R	WIG; 3R	BAR; DNP		NIE; 1R	NIE; 2R	BAR; 1R	BAR; 1R	BAR; 2R	BAR; 2R	BAR; 4R	WIG; 1R	WIG; 1R	NIE; 3R	NIE; 2R	BAR; 4R	BAR; 1R	BAR; 1R	BAR; 2R	BAR; 1R	BAR; 1R	BAR; 2R	BAR; 1R	BAR; 2R	BAR; 1R	BAR; 1R	BAR; 1R	BAR; 1R
2023	Did not participate												HIL; 1R	HIL; 2R	LEI; 1R	LEI; 2R	Did not participate													BAR; 2R

Performance Table Legend
W	Won the tournament	F	Finalist	SF	Semifinalist	QF	Quarterfinalist	#R; RR; Prel.	Lost in # round Round-robin; Preliminary round	DQ	Disqualified
DNQ	Did not qualify	DNP	Did not participate	WD	Withdrew	NH	Tournament not held	#R; RR; Prel.	Lost in # round Round-robin; Preliminary round	NYF	Not yet founded
