= 2014 World Masters (darts) =

Winmau World Masters

Tournament information
- Dates: 9–12 October
- Venue: Bonus Arena and Hull City Hall
- Location: East Riding of Yorkshire
- Country: England
- Organisation(s): BDO
- Format: Sets (best of 3 legs) for men, Legs for women, boys and girls
- Prize fund: £70,500
- Winner's share: £25,000 (men), £5,000 (women)
- High checkout: £1k (non-televised), £2k (televised)

Champion(s)
- (Wales) Martin Phillips (men) (Russia) Anastasia Dobromyslova (women) (Netherlands) Colin Roelofs (boys) (Republic of Ireland) Robyn Byrne (girls)

The 2014 Winmau World Masters was a major tournament on the BDO/WDF calendar for 2014. It took place from 9–12 October, with 9 October played at the Bonus Arena for the non-stage matches, and 10–12 October played at the Hull City Hall, which hosted the stage element of the event for the fourth year.

Stephen Bunting was unable to defend his title due to his switch to the PDC. Deta Hedman attempted to defend the title she won in 2013 as the number 1 seed. Maud Jansson defeated her 4–2 in the last 64 though. Another seed that was knocked out before the quarter-finals was Lorraine Winstanley who lost 1–3 in the last 16 to Lisa Ashton. Anastasia Dobromyslova ended up winning the competition by defeating Fallon Sherrock 4–1 in the final. In the men's final Martin Phillips defeated Jamie Hughes 7–3.

In the girls competition 17-year-old Robyn Byrne defeated 10-year-old Beau Greaves 4–0 in the final. In the boys competition Colin Roelofs defeated Callan Rydz 4–1 in the final.

== Seeds ==
Men
The seedings were finalised on completion of the 2014 French Open and the 2014 Scottish Classic on 30 August. For the third consecutive year, there are 32 seeds (an increase from 8 between 2007 and 2011) with the Top 16 exempt until the Last 32 stage.

1. (England) James Wilson
2. (England) Martin Adams
3. (England) Alan Norris
4. (England) Scott Mitchell
5. (England) Glen Durrant
6. (England) Jamie Hughes
7. (England) Robbie Green
8. (Wales) Martin Phillips
9. (Netherlands) Wesley Harms
10. (England) Gary Robson
11. (Netherlands) Jeffrey de Graaf
12. (Scotland) Ross Montgomery
13. (Netherlands) Rick Hofstra
14. (Netherlands) Remco van Eijden
15. (England) Scott Waites
16. (England) Darryl Fitton
17. (Netherlands) Jan Dekker
18. (England) Tony O'Shea
19. (Latvia) Madars Razma
20. (Belgium) Geert De Vos
21. (Lithuania) Darius Labanauskas
22. (England) Pip Blackwell
23. (England) Sam Head
24. (England) Garry Thompson
25. (England) Sam Hewson
26. (England) Paul Jennings
27. (Scotland) Paul Coughlin
28. (England) Brian Dawson
29. (England) Richie George
30. (Wales) Jim Williams
31. (Netherlands) Michel van der Horst
32. (England) Dave Smith

Women
The seedings were finalised on completion of the 2014 French Open and the 2014 Scottish Classic on 30 August. The ladies seeds enter at the start of the competition however can not play each other until the quarter-final stage.

1. (England) Deta Hedman
2. (Russia) Anastasia Dobromyslova
3. (Netherlands) Aileen de Graaf
4. (England) Trina Gulliver
5. (England) Rachel Brooks
6. (England) Lorraine Winstanley
7. (England) Zoe Jones
8. (England) Fallon Sherrock

There were no seedings in the boys or girls events.

== Men's Draw ==
Last 32 onwards.

Sets are best of 3 legs.

Last 32; Best of 5 sets Losers £250
1	(England) James Wilson (93.96)	0
(England) Mark McGeeney (106.14)	3
16	(England) Darryl Fitton (88.62)	2
(Japan) Seigo Asada (86.10)	3
8	(Wales) Martin Phillips (99.93)	3
(England) Andy Boulton (81.51)	0
9	(Netherlands) Wesley Harms (90.60)	1
(England) Rhys Hayden (85.08)	3
5	(England) Glen Durrant (83.46)	3
28	(England) Brian Dawson (82.56)	2
12	(Scotland) Ross Montgomery (77.85)	1
(Netherlands) Jeffrey de Zwaan (80.34)	3
4	(England) Scott Mitchell (87.66)	3
(England) Paul Hogan (85.65)	2
13	(Netherlands) Rick Hofstra (86.40)	2
(Sweden) Daniel Larsson (84.18)	3
2	(England) Martin Adams (98.61)	3
(England) Dennis Harbour (89.82)	2
15	(England) Scott Waites (82.44)	2
(Wales) Nick Kenny (84.36)	3
7	(England) Robbie Green (86.22)	1
(Netherlands) Willem Mandigers (87.18)	3
10	(England) Gary Robson (98.79)	3
(Netherlands) Matthew Medhurst (69.24)	0
6	(England) Jamie Hughes (98.34)	3
(England) Shayne Burgess (84.15)	1
11	(Netherlands) Jeffrey de Graaf (86.22)	1
22	(England) Pip Blackwell (86.55)	3
3	(England) Alan Norris (92.22)	3
(England) Chris Dobey (85.26)	1
14	(Netherlands) Remco van Eijden (79.98)	3
19	(Latvia) Madars Razma (76.68)	0

Last 16; Best of 5 sets Losers £1,000
(England) Mark McGeeney (87.75)	3
(Japan) Seigo Asada (81.63)	2
8	(Wales) Martin Phillips (84.36)	3
(England) Rhys Hayden (74.97)	0
5	(England) Glen Durrant (87.36)	3
(Netherlands) Jeffrey de Zwaan (78.83)	0
4	(England) Scott Mitchell (93.54)	3
(Sweden) Daniel Larsson (85.71)	0
2	(England) Martin Adams (99.33)	3
(Wales) Nick Kenny (94.77)	2
(Netherlands) Willem Mandigers (88.38)	1
10	(England) Gary Robson (93.54)	3
6	(England) Jamie Hughes (88.98)	3
22	(England) Pip Blackwell (90.00)	1
3	(England) Alan Norris (98.40)	3
14	(Netherlands) Remco van Eijden (91.68)	1

Quarter-finals; Best of 5 sets Losers £1,500
(England) Mark McGeeney (86.43)	0
8	(Wales) Martin Phillips (92.55)	3
5	(England) Glen Durrant (90.81)	3
4	(England) Scott Mitchell (90.06)	2
2	(England) Martin Adams (96.84)	3
10	(England) Gary Robson (91.71)	2
6	(England) Jamie Hughes (80.55)	3
3	(England) Alan Norris (81.99)	2

Semi-finals; Best of 11 sets Losers £3,000
8	(Wales) Martin Phillips (90.63)	6
5	(England) Glen Durrant (90.39)	5
2	(England) Martin Adams (87.90)	5
6	(England) Jamie Hughes (89.10)	6

Final; Best of 13 sets Winner £25,000; Runner up £10,000
8	(Wales) Martin Phillips (89.67)	7
6	(England) Jamie Hughes (82.08)	3

== Ladies Draw ==
Last 8 onwards.

Quarter-finals; Best of 7 legs Losers £500
(Japan) Mayumi Ōuchi	0
8	(England) Fallon Sherrock	4
4	(England) Trina Gulliver	2
5	(England) Rachel Brooks	4
2	(Russia) Anastasia Dobromyslova	4
7	(England) Zoe Jones	0
3	(Netherlands) Aileen de Graaf	4
(England) Lisa Ashton	1

Semi-finals; Best of 7 legs Losers £750
8	(England) Fallon Sherrock (73.14)	4
5	(England) Rachel Brooks (69.93)	3
2	(Russia) Anastasia Dobromyslova (85.89)	4
3	(Netherlands) Aileen de Graaf (81.81)	2

Final; Best of 7 legs Winner £5,000; Runner up £2,000
8	(England) Fallon Sherrock (72.00)	1
2	(Russia) Anastasia Dobromyslova (74.67)	4

== Boys Draw ==
Last 8 onwards.

Quarter-finals; Best of 7 legs
(Netherlands) Maarten Dirk Woord	4
(Republic of Ireland) Dean Finn	2
(Wales) Rhys Griffin	1
(England) Callan Rydz	4
(Netherlands) Colin Roelofs	4
(England) Kieran Smith	3
(Denmark) Andreas Bergo	2
(England) Cameron Hinchcliffe	4

Semi-finals; Best of 7 legs
(Netherlands) Maarten Dirk Woord	0
(England) Callan Rydz	4
(Netherlands) Colin Roelofs	4
(England) Cameron Hinchcliffe	1

Final; Best of 7 legs
(England) Callan Rydz (81.33)	1
(Netherlands) Colin Roelofs (84.24)	4

== Girls Draw ==
Last 8 onwards.

Quarter-finals; Best of 7 legs
(Scotland) Gayle Maxwell	3
(England) Beau Greaves	4
(Netherlands) Kyana Frauenfelder	4
(England) Casey Stephenson	2
(Austria) Selina Rechberger	4
(England) Grace Angell	2
(Republic of Ireland) Robyn Byrne	4
(Sweden) Jaqueline Alpvik	1

Semi-finals; Best of 7 legs
(England) Beau Greaves	4
(Netherlands) Kyana Frauenfelder	2
(Austria) Selina Rechberger	1
(Republic of Ireland) Robyn Byrne	4

Final; Best of 7 legs
(England) Beau Greaves (47.37)	0
(Republic of Ireland) Robyn Byrne (58.38)	4

== Television coverage ==
Eurosport showed the final session of play of the event across Europe.
