= Martin Adams =

English darts player (born 1956)

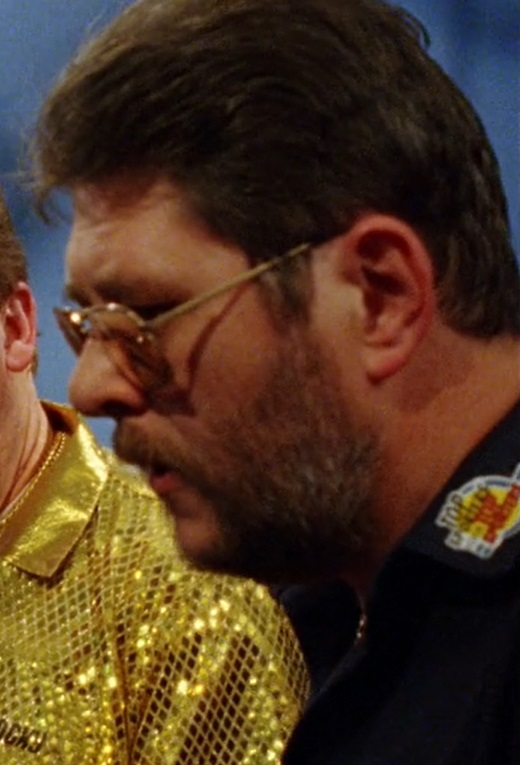
- Adams in 2022

Personal information
- Nickname: "Wolfie"
- Born: 4 June 1956 (age 70) Sutton, London, England
- Home town: Deeping St James, Lincolnshire, England

Sport
- Sport: Darts
- Playing since: 1981
- Darts: 22g Datadart Signature
- Laterality: Right-handed
- Walk-on music: "Hungry Like the Wolf" by Duran Duran

Organisation (see split in darts)
- BDO: 1988–2020
- WDF: 1988–2022

WDF major events – best performances
- World Championship: Winner (3): 2007, 2010, 2011
- World Masters: Winner (3): 2008, 2009, 2010
- World Trophy: Runner-up: 2004, 2006
- Int. Darts League: Semi-final: 2003, 2005
- Finder Masters: Winner (2): 1996, 2000
- Dutch Open: Winner (4): 2010, 2011, 2015, 2016

PDC premier events – best performances
- World Matchplay: Semi-final: 2001
- World Grand Prix: Quarter-final: 2001
- Grand Slam: Last 16: 2015

WSDT major events – best performances
- World Championship: Runner-up: 2022
- World Matchplay: Semi-final: 2022
- World Masters: Quarter-final: 2022, 2024
- Champions: Semi-final: 2023, 2024

Other tournament wins
- Years
WDF Europe Cup Singles	1996
WDF Europe Cup Pairs	1996, 2002, 2008, 2010
WDF Europe Cup Team	1994, 1996, 1998, 2000, 2004
WDF World Cup Singles	1995, 2001
WDF World Cup Pairs	1995, 2003, 2011
WDF World Cup Team	1995, 1999, 2001, 2007, 2011
WDF World Rankings	2010

Martin Adams (born 4 June 1956) is an English professional darts player who competes in World Darts Federation (WDF) events. Nicknamed "Wolfie", he is a three-time BDO World Champion and three-time World Masters champion. He represents Cambridgeshire at county darts level and was the captain of England from 1993 to 2013, the longest any player has held that role. From his debut in 1994, Adams made a record 25 consecutive World Championship appearances, before failing to qualify for the first time in 2019. Adams was diagnosed with prostate cancer in April 2016, but by the end of the year he was given the all-clear. As well as playing, he also acted as a regular pundit and commentator for televised coverage of BDO events.

== Darts career ==
=== 1994–2006 ===
Adams was born in Sutton, Surrey and started his darts career in pubs. He still plays pub darts, currently playing for The Bell Tavern in Deeping St James, Lincolnshire. After being made redundant by Lloyds Bank, he turned professional in 1992.

Adams made his BDO World Darts Championship debut in 1994, the first world championship staged after the infamous split in darts, in which the top-16 players left the BDO to form the World Darts Council. As the departing players were also banned from county darts, Adams also took over the role as England captain in 1993 and remained captain until March 2013, becoming the longest reigning England captain ever.

For many years, Adams was known as the nearly man at the Lakeside tournament, often reaching the latter stages but without winning it. On several occasions, he lost crucial matches from winning positions or an opponent making a great comeback. In the 1999 world championship quarter-finals, he lost 5–4 to Chris Mason, having led 4–1 and missed nine match darts. He twice lost a semi-final in a deciding set, against Raymond van Barneveld in 1995 and Tony David in 2002. Against David, Adams recovered from a 1–4 deficit to tie the match at 4–4. In the deciding set, Adams missed two darts at double-16 to save the match, and David then hit double-top to advance to the final. Adams also suffered first round exits at Lakeside in 1997 (to Roger Carter), 1998 (to Robbie Widdows), 2000 (to Steve Coote) and 2004 (to Ritchie Davies).

In 2005, Adams reached the world final at the 12th attempt. He beat Davy Richardson 3–2, John Henderson 3–2, Ted Hankey 5–3 and Simon Whitlock 5–0 before losing 6–2 against van Barneveld in the final. The following year, he reached the semi-finals, and again was beaten 6–2 by van Barneveld.

In the BDO's second biggest major, the Winmau World Masters, it was a similar story. Adams reached four semi-finals, losing to Steve Beaton in 1994, Erik Clarys in 1995, Les Wallace in 1998 and van Barneveld in 2005. In 2006, Adams reached his first Masters final, where he lost to 7–5 to 17-year-old Michael van Gerwen, having led 5–2 in sets and despite averaging 107 for the first nine darts of each leg.

Adams has won many BDO Open events and twice won the WDF World Cup singles. In the Grand Slam BDO events, other than the World Championship, Adams was beaten 6–4 in the 2004 Bavaria World Darts Trophy final by Raymond van Barneveld and lost the 2006 Bavaria World Darts Trophy final to Phil Taylor 7–2.

Adams reached the semi-finals of the revived News of the World Darts Championship in 1997, where he lost 2–1 to Phil Taylor.

=== 2007 ===
Adams reached his second world final in 2007. He was number one seed for the second time in his career and put out Tony O'Shea, Co Stompé, Ted Hankey and Mervyn King in his run to the final where he faced qualifier Phil Nixon. The two oldest players in the tournament (they were both 50 years old) reached the final. Adams stormed into a 6–0 lead, before Nixon produced an incredible comeback to level the match. Just when it looked like Adams was heading for another dramatic defeat, having already missed four match darts, he went on to win all three legs in the final set to take the match 7–6 and finally claim the world title that he said he had been chasing for 14 years.

=== 2008 ===
In the draw for the 2008 BDO World Championships, Adams was again paired with Nixon in the first round. In the match, Adams beat Nixon 3–0. After the game, Adams was clearly emotional in an interview following his victory, citing the memories of the 2007 final as the reason (the first time he had won comfortably). In the second round he came up against Martin Phillips. It was easy pickings for Adams, who cruised to a 4–0 victory with Phillips paying the price for many missed doubles. In the quarter-finals he played a fiercely fought match against Masters champion Robert Thornton, whom he led at one time 4–2. Thornton fought back to make it 4–4 but Adams eventually took control of his visible nerves to win 5–4. Adams went on to lose in the semi-finals to number-one seed Mark Webster, who eventually won the tournament.

Adams defeated Scott Waites in the World Masters final of 2008 to record his first Masters victory and his second major (after the 2007 Worlds), in another epic 7–6 encounter.

=== 2009 ===
At the 2009 World Championship, he reached the semifinal for the fifth successive year, where he was narrowly defeated by eventual champion Ted Hankey. Later that year, he won his second successive Masters title, once again by a 7–6 scoreline in the final, over Robbie Green after Green led by 6–3 and had a dart for the title. This win made Adams the first man to retain the Masters title since Bob Anderson in 1988. Adams joined Eric Bristow, Richie Burnett, Bob Anderson and John Walton as the fifth player to win them in the same season.

=== 2010 ===
In the 2010 World Championship he beat a visibly nervous Anthony Fleet in the first round without losing a leg, followed by further comfortable victories over Daryl Gurney and Garry Thompson. In the semi-final he let a 5–1 lead slip over Welshman Martin Phillips before finally winning 6–4. He then defeated unseeded Dave Chisnall 7–5 in the final to win a second World Championship in a rematch of their first round match a year earlier.

In February 2010 he won the Dutch Open title for the first time in his long career. The England captain triumphed 3–1 over international team-mate Scott Waites in the men's singles final in Veldhoven.

Adams won his third successive World Masters title in 2010 by defeating Stuart Kellett 7–3 in the final, becoming only the second player in history to win three consecutive World Masters titles, the other being Bob Anderson.

=== 2011 ===
Adams reached his fourth World Championship final in the 2011 tournament, defeating Tony West, John Walton, Ross Smith and Martin Phillips to get there. The match against Walton was especially memorable as it went to a sudden death leg, which Adams won despite Walton having the advantage of throw. Adams played Dean Winstanley in the final, the 3rd seed – marking the only time Adams played a seed in either the 2010 or 2011 World Championship – and won 7–5 to become the first player since Raymond van Barneveld to successfully defend the BDO World Championship.

Later in January, Adams successfully defended his Dutch Open crown, once again defeating Winstanley in a close final (3–2 in sets). Adams then reached the singles final at the WDF World Cup where he was defeated by Scott Waites, and also won the doubles event with Waites. At the 2011 World Masters, the three-time defending champion was beaten by eventual champion Waites 5–3 in the semi-finals.

=== 2012 ===
Adams was the top seed at the 2012 World Championship. He beat Scott Mitchell and Gary Stone without dropping a set, but was defeated 5–2 in the quarter-final by former runner-up Tony O'Shea, who went on to reach the final.

Adams had a difficult season in 2012, losing in his first match at the Masters 3–1 to Rune David before being eliminated in the group stage of Zuiderduin Masters without winning either of his matches.

=== 2013 ===
At the 2013 World Championship, Adams was beaten 3–2 by teenage débutante Jimmy Hendriks. During the season Adams had been very much focused on his personal life. He lost weight and gave up smoking. Adams eventually refound his form.

=== 2014 ===
At the 2014 World Championship, Adams reached the quarter-finals with comfortable wins over David Cameron, Tony O'Shea (in which O'Shea failed to win a leg) and Ross Montgomery before losing 5–2 to Jan Dekker. Adams got back to world number two and won a number of key tournaments. At the 2014 Winmau World Masters, Adams narrowly missed out on reaching the final for the first time since 2010 as he let a 5–2 semi-final lead slip against Jamie Hughes, also missing 10 match darts in the ninth set.

=== 2015 ===
He opened his 2015 World Championship campaign with a 3–1 victory over Jan Dekker, setting up a tie against Jim Widmayer in the second round. He whitewashed Widmayer 4–0 to advance to the quarter-final stage, where he would face Ross Montgomery. He comfortably beat Montgomery 5–1 to go through to the semi-finals, to play Glen Durrant, who he edged out 6–5 to reach the final. Adams had a near nine darter hitting the treble 20 7 times and hitting the treble 19 but missed the double 12, if he had hit it, he would have been the first person to hit a 9 darter at the BDO World Championship in 25 years since Paul Lim in 1990. In the final, he was narrowly defeated by Scott Mitchell 7–6 in a deciding set.

In November 2015, Adams made his first PDC tournament appearance since 2007, at the 2015 Grand Slam of Darts, where topped his group with three wins of out of three, with victories against Ian White and two former BDO World Champions in Jelle Klaasen and Steve Beaton. In the last 16, Adams faced Kim Huybrechts where he narrowly lost 10–9. Adams rallied from 6-3 and 9-7 deficits to force a decisive leg which Huybrechts won on a 13 darter. In his post-match interview, Adams praised the crowds and said he would likely return to the tournament next year if invited.

=== 2016 ===
Adams was the number two seed going into the 2016 World Championship, but was handed a tough first round draw against Canadian Jeff Smith, who had reached the semi-finals the previous year. Ultimately, Adams was whitewashed for the first time ever at Lakeside, suffering a 3 sets to nil defeat. He recovered from this setback by winning the Dutch Open just a few weeks later, beating Danny Noppert in the final.

At the 2016 Grand Slam of Darts, Adams was grouped with Michael van Gerwen, Brendan Dolan and Max Hopp. He lost all three matches and finished bottom of the group. To date, this marks his last appearance at a PDC televised tournament.

=== 2017 ===
Adams was the 5th seed for the 2017 World Championship, and was drawn to play the winner of a preliminary round match, which Ryan Joyce won beating Dennis Nilsson. Adams narrowly defeated Joyce 3–2 in sets to set up a rematch against Jeff Smith, who had whitewashed him the previous year. Adams was able to avenge his loss with a convincing 4–1 win over the Canadian. He would eventually go out at the quarter-finals stage to 4th seed Jamie Hughes, in a thrilling 5–4 defeat.

=== 2018 ===
Adams qualified for the 2018 World Championship, but was not seeded and thus was handed a difficult first round draw against the number two seed Mark McGeeney. Despite a gallant effort, Adams would lose 3 sets to 2 in a close match.

=== 2019 ===
Adams failed to qualify for the 2019 World Championship, making it the first that he would miss the event since making his debut in 1994. It ended a run of 25 consecutive appearances. He did, however, win his first ranking tournament for nearly three years by clinching the Italian Open.

=== 2020 ===
In the 2020 World Championship, Adams lost 3–2 in the first round to Scott Waites.

=== 2022 ===
Adams reached the final of the 2022 World Seniors Darts Championship losing 5–1 to Robert Thornton at the Circus Tavern. He participated in his 27th World Championship at the 2022 WDF World Darts Championship at Lakeside where he lost to Jarred Cole in the first round.

== Stance on the Professional Darts Corporation ==
Adams played in three major PDC television events in 2000–2001, which were the 2000 World Matchplay (losing to Shayne Burgess in the first round), the 2001 World Matchplay (losing to Phil Taylor in the semi-finals), and the 2001 World Grand Prix (losing to John Lowe in the quarter-finals). Adams also won a non-televised Players Championship tournament, the 1999 Scania Open, where he beat Phil Taylor in the final.

When eligibility rules for entry into PDC television tournaments changed at the start of 2002, Adams was unable to compete in them as he decided to remain a BDO player. After the 2001 World Matchplay, it would be over five years before Adams faced Taylor in a match again, in the final of the 2006 World Darts Trophy (a BDO major), where Adams lost 2–7 in the final of the Dutch competition which invited five PDC players that year.

Since the 2001 World Grand Prix and the subsequent change in the eligibility rules for entry into PDC television tournaments from 2002 onwards, Adams did not compete in a PDC event again until 14 years later. When the Grand Slam of Darts began in 2007, Adams turned down the invitation to compete in the PDC event and continued to decline the offer to compete in subsequent years. The PDC's Board of Directors ruled that Adams will no longer be eligible for invitations into the tournament in future. Adams brushed off their decision, saying that it would simply save him the time in having to refuse them. Commentators at the 2009 Grand Slam confirmed that they had once again unsuccessfully invited him to that year's event.

Rumours of a possible appearance at the 2011 Grand Slam began following an interview with BBC commentator David Croft just before the 2011 BDO World Championship. Adams said that "he had held discussions with the BDO and certain political issues had been sorted regarding the other side of the game" when asked by Croft about whether in theory a match could take place with the winner of the respective PDC World Championship. Despite the rumour, Adams never competed at the 2011 Grand Slam.

However, Adams was invited to the 2015 Grand Slam. In Adams' debut at the Grand Slam, he went undefeated in the three group matches of the first round but lost 9-10 (best of 19) in his second round match with Kim Huybrechts.

== World Championship results ==
=== BDO/WDF ===
- 1994: Quarter-finals (lost to Magnus Caris 2–4)
- 1995: Semi-finals (lost to Raymond van Barneveld 4–5)
- 1996: Quarter-finals (lost to Steve Beaton 1–4)
- 1997: First round (lost to Roger Carter 1–3)
- 1998: First round (lost to Robbie Widdows 2–3)
- 1999: Quarter-finals (lost to Chris Mason 4–5)
- 2000: First round (lost to Steve Coote 2–3)
- 2001: Second round (lost to Ronnie Baxter 1–3)
- 2002: Semi-finals (lost to Tony David 4–5)
- 2003: Second round (lost to Bob Taylor 1–3)
- 2004: First round (lost to Ritchie Davies 2–3)
- 2005: Runner-up (lost to Raymond van Barneveld 2–6)
- 2006: Semi-finals (lost to Raymond van Barneveld 2–6)
- 2007: Winner (beat Phill Nixon 7–6)
- 2008: Semi-finals (lost to Mark Webster 4–6)
- 2009: Semi-finals (lost to Ted Hankey 4–6)
- 2010: Winner (beat Dave Chisnall 7–5)
- 2011: Winner (beat Dean Winstanley 7–5)
- 2012: Quarter-finals (lost to Tony O'Shea 2–5)
- 2013: First round (lost to Jimmy Hendriks 2–3)
- 2014: Quarter-finals (lost to Jan Dekker 2–5)
- 2015: Runner-up (lost to Scott Mitchell 6–7)
- 2016: First round (lost to Jeff Smith 0–3)
- 2017: Quarter-finals (lost to Jamie Hughes 4–5)
- 2018: First round (lost to Mark McGeeney 2–3)
- 2020: First round (lost to Scott Waites 2–3)
- 2022: First round (lost to Jarred Cole 0–2)

=== WSDT ===
- 2022: Runner-up (lost to Robert Thornton 1–5)
- 2023: Second round (lost to Leonard Gates 0–3)
- 2024: Second round (lost to Jim Long 0–3)
- 2025: First round (lost to Darryl Fitton 0–3)

== Career finals ==
=== BDO major finals: 14 (6 titles) ===
Legend
World Championship (3–2)
Winmau World Masters (3–1)
British Matchplay (1–0)
World Darts Trophy (0–2)
Zuiderduin Masters (2–3)

Outcome	No.	Year	Championship	Opponent in the final	Score (Note: (l) = score in legs, (s) = score in sets.)
Runner-up	1.	2004	World Darts Trophy	(Netherlands) Raymond van Barneveld	4–6 (s)
Runner-up	2.	2005	World Championship	(Netherlands) Raymond van Barneveld	2–6 (s)
Runner-up	3.	2005	Zuiderduin Masters	(England) Mervyn King	4–5 (s)
Runner-up	4.	2006	World Darts Trophy	(England) Phil Taylor	2–7 (s)
Runner-up	5.	2006	Winmau World Masters	(Netherlands) Michael van Gerwen	5–7 (s)
Winner	1.	2007	World Championship	(England) Phill Nixon	7–6 (s)
Winner	2.	2008	Winmau World Masters	(England) Scott Waites	7–6 (s)
Winner	3.	2009	Winmau World Masters	(England) Robbie Green	7–6 (s)
Runner-up	6.	2009	Zuiderduin Masters	(England) Darryl Fitton	2–5 (s)
Winner	4.	2010	World Championship	(England) Dave Chisnall	7–5 (s)
Winner	5.	2010	Winmau World Masters	(England) Stuart Kellett	7–3 (s)
Winner	6.	2011	World Championship	(England) Dean Winstanley	7–5 (s)
Runner-up	7.	2015	World Championship	(England) Scott Mitchell	6–7 (s)
Runner-up	8.	2015	Zuiderduin Masters	(England) Glen Durrant	2–5 (s)

=== Seniors major finals: 1 (1 runner-up) ===
Outcome	No.	Year	Championship	Opponent	Score
Runner-up	1.	2022	World Seniors Darts Championship	(Scotland) Robert Thornton	1–5 (s)

== Performance timeline ==
Tournament	1990	1992	1993	1994	1995	1996	1997	1998	1999	2000	2001	2002	2003	2004	2005	2006	2007	2008	2009	2010	2011	2012	2013	2014	2015	2016	2017	2018
BDO World Championship	DNQ			QF	SF	QF	1R	1R	QF	1R	2R	SF	2R	1R	F	SF	W	SF	SF	W	W	QF	1R	QF	F	1R	QF	1R
BDO World Trophy	Not held																							QF	1R	2R	QF	DNQ
International Darts League	Not held												SF	QF	SF	QF	RR	Not held										
World Darts Trophy	Not held											2R	QF	F	SF	F	QF	Not held										
Winmau World Masters	3R	QF	1R	SF	SF	2R	4R	SF	1R	4R	4R	4R	4R	QF	SF	F	QF	W	W	W	SF	5R	5R	SF	SF	5R	1R	4R
Finder Darts Masters	Not held				?	W	Not held			W	QF	QF	QF	RR	F	NH	QF	RR	F	SF	SF	RR	RR	QF	F	QF	RR	RR

PDC

Tournament	2000	2001	2015	2016
World Matchplay	1R	SF	Non-PDC	
World Grand Prix	DNP	QF	Non-PDC	
Grand Slam of Darts	Not held		2R	RR

Performance Table Legend
W	Won the tournament	F	Finalist	SF	Semifinalist	QF	Quarterfinalist	#R; RR; Prel.	Lost in # round Round-robin; Preliminary round	DQ	Disqualified
DNQ	Did not qualify	DNP	Did not participate	WD	Withdrew	NH	Tournament not held	#R; RR; Prel.	Lost in # round Round-robin; Preliminary round	NYF	Not yet founded

== High averages ==
Martin Adams televised high averages
Average	Date	Opponent	Tournament	Stage	Score	Ref.
110.52	7 December 2007	(England) Steve Coote	2007 Zuiderduin Masters	Group stage	5–0 (L)	
