= 2008 World Masters (darts) =

Winmau World Masters

Tournament information
- Dates: 5–7 December 2008
- Venue: Bridlington Spa Royal Hall
- Location: East Riding of Yorkshire, England
- Country: England
- Organisation(s): BDO
- Format: Sets (best of 3 legs) for men, Legs for women, boys and girls Finals: best of 13 (men's)
- Prize fund: £50,000
- Winner's share: £25,000 (men's)

Champion(s)
- (England) Martin Adams (men) (Netherlands) Francis Hoenselaar (women) (England) Shaun Griffiths (boys) (Sweden) Linda Oden (girls)

The 2008 Winmau World Masters was the fourth major tournament on the BDO/WDF calendar for 2008. It took place from 5–7 December in the Bridlington Spa Royal Hall. Martin Adams beat Scott Waites in the final to take his first Masters title and join an elite list of players to win both the World Championship and the Masters in their career.

== Prize money ==
The total prize money was £50,000.

Position (num. of players)		Prize money
Winner	(1)	£25,000
Runner-up	(1)	£10,000
Semi-finalist	(2)	£3,000
Quarter-finalist	(4)	£1,250
Round Six losers	(8)	£500

== Draw ==
Round Five onwards:

Round five
(England)	John Walton	1
(Norway)	Robert Wagner	3
(Netherlands)	Joey ten Berge	3
(Scotland)	Mark Barilli	0
(England)	Steve West	3
(Denmark)	Søren Behrendsen	0
(Netherlands)	Cor Ernst	3
(England)	John Dean	2
(Scotland)	Ross Montgomery	3
(Netherlands)	Stefan Gerritsen	0
(England)	Tony O'Shea	3
(England)	Robbie Green	1
(England)	Steve Farmer	3
(England)	Paul Gibbs	0
(England)	Martin Atkins	3
(Spain)	Antonio Alcinas	1

Round Six
(Norway)	Robert Wagner 88.95	3
(Scotland)	Gary Anderson 91.77	1
(Netherlands)	Joey ten Berge 86.61	3
(Netherlands)	Edwin Max 90.09	1
(England)	Steve West 84.87	3
(England)	Darryl Fitton 85.86	1
(England)	Scott Waites 89.19	3
(Netherlands)	Cor Ernst 86.10	1
(Wales)	Mark Webster 93.21	1
(Scotland)	Ross Montgomery 87.42	3
(England)	Ted Hankey 86.04	1
(England)	Tony O'Shea 95.07	3
(England)	Gary Robson 82.83	2
(England)	Steve Farmer 92.40	3
(England)	Martin Atkins 96.15	2
(England)	Martin Adams 99.39	3

Quarter-finals
(Norway)	Robert Wagner 101.34	3
(Netherlands)	Joey ten Berge 85.89	0
(England)	Steve West 88.65	1
(England)	Scott Waites 90.84	3
(Scotland)	Ross Montgomery 92.31	1
(England)	Tony O'Shea 97.47	3
(England)	Steve Farmer 94.59	0
(England)	Martin Adams 93.87	3

Semifinals
(Norway)	Robert Wagner 94.98	4
(England)	Scott Waites 96.75	6
(England)	Tony O'Shea 101.67	2
(England)	Martin Adams 105.78	6

Final
(England)	Scott Waites 95.55	6
(England)	Martin Adams 97.26	7
