= Grand Slam of Darts =

Mr Vegas Grand Slam of Darts
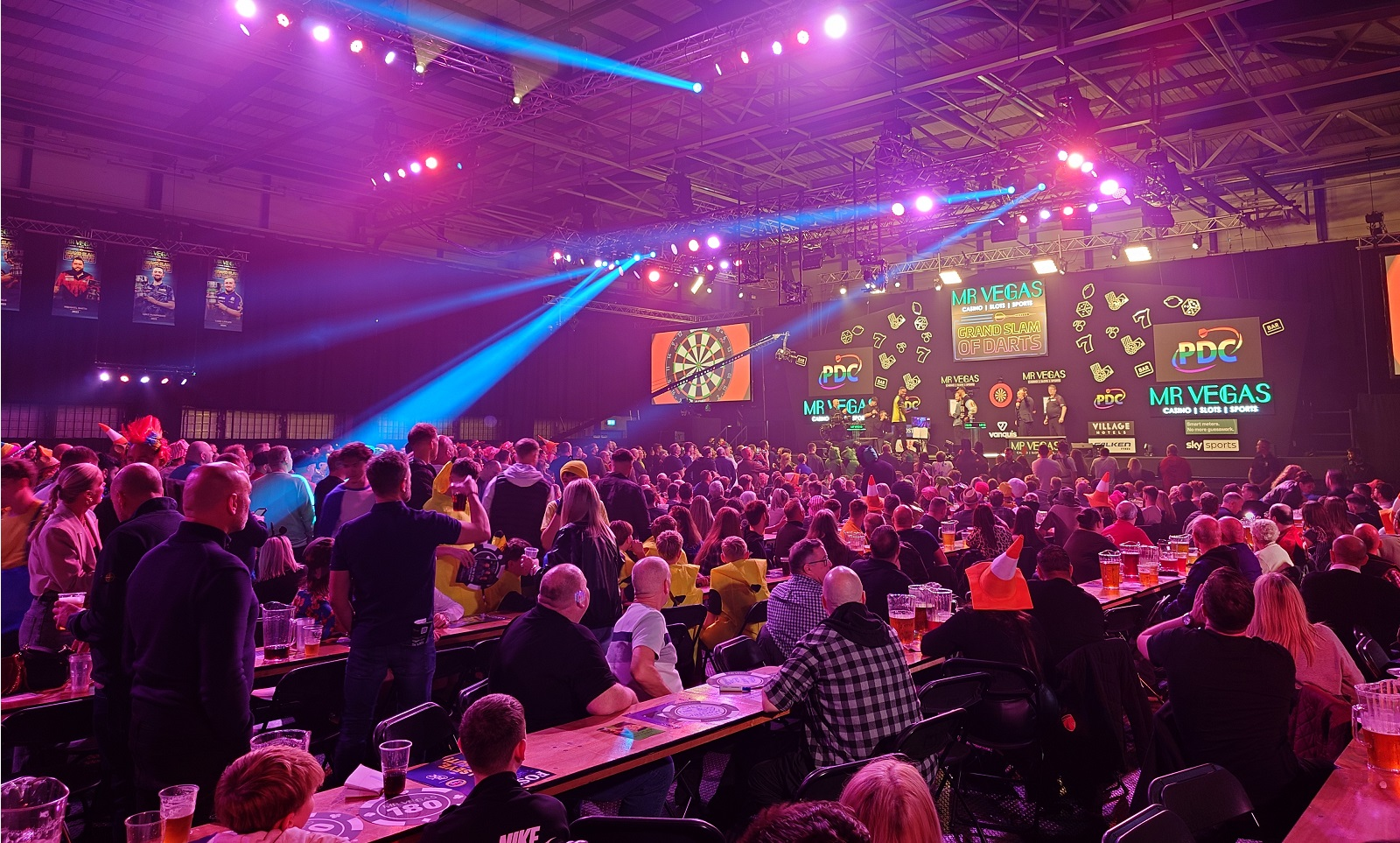
- The stage at the 2025 edition

Tournament information
- Venue: Civic Hall (2007–17); WV Active - Aldersley (2018–19, 2021–); Coventry Arena (2020)
- Location: Wolverhampton (2007–19, 2021–); Coventry (2020)
- Country: England
- Established: 2007
- Organisation(s): PDC; BDO (until 2020)
- Format: Legs
- Prize fund: £1,000,000 (2026)
- Month(s) Played: November

Current champion(s)
- (Wales) Gerwyn Price

The Grand Slam of Darts (known for sponsorship reasons as the Mr Vegas Grand Slam of Darts) is an annual professional darts tournament organised by the Professional Darts Corporation (PDC). Established in 2007, the tournament is held each November and has been classified as a PDC ranking event since the 2015 edition.

From its inception until 2019, the tournament was notable as a cross-code event that invited top-performing players from the rival British Darts Organisation (BDO), marking the first time players from both organisations competed against one another in a major tournament in the United Kingdom. Scott Waites was the only BDO representative to win the title, doing so in 2010. Following the BDO's collapse into liquidation in September 2020, the tournament became an exclusively PDC event, featuring winners and runners-up from major PDC tournaments alongside qualifiers.

The tournament has been held in Wolverhampton every year except 2020, when the COVID-19 pandemic in the United Kingdom forced the event to be staged behind closed doors at the Coventry Arena. Within Wolverhampton, it was hosted at the Wolverhampton Civic Hall from 2007 to 2017 before moving to WV Active – Aldersley (formerly Aldersley Leisure Village) in 2018 due to renovations at the Civic Hall, remaining there since its return to the city in 2021.

Phil Taylor is the tournament's most successful player, having won six titles (2007–2009, 2011, 2013–2014). Michael van Gerwen (2015–2017) and Gerwyn Price (2018–2019, 2021) have each won the event three times. Since 2018, the winner has been awarded the Eric Bristow Trophy, renamed in honour of the five-time world champion Eric Bristow following his death that year.

== Finals ==
Year	Champion (average in final)	Ch's org	Score	Runner-up (average in final)	Prize money			Venue
Year	Champion (average in final)	Ch's org	Score	Runner-up (average in final)	Total	Champion	Runner-up	Venue
2007	Phil Taylor (101.75)	PDC	18–11	Andy Hamilton (100.97)	£300,000	£80,000	£35,000	Civic Hall, Wolverhampton
2008	Phil Taylor (106.25)	PDC	18–9	Terry Jenkins (100.92)	£356,000	£100,000	£40,000	Civic Hall, Wolverhampton
2009	Phil Taylor (103.94)	PDC	16–2	Scott Waites (94.16)	£400,000	£100,000	£50,000	Civic Hall, Wolverhampton
2010	Scott Waites (99.86)	BDO	16–12	James Wade (92.79)	£400,000	£100,000	£50,000	Civic Hall, Wolverhampton
2011	Phil Taylor (109.04)	PDC	16–4	Gary Anderson (98.92)	£400,000	£100,000	£50,000	Civic Hall, Wolverhampton
2012	Raymond van Barneveld (95.79)	PDC	16–14	Michael van Gerwen (98.55)	£400,000	£100,000	£50,000	Civic Hall, Wolverhampton
2013	Phil Taylor (98.14)	PDC	16–6	Robert Thornton (97.02)	£400,000	£100,000	£50,000	Civic Hall, Wolverhampton
2014	Phil Taylor (102.45)	PDC	16–13	Dave Chisnall (98.02)	£400,000	£100,000	£50,000	Civic Hall, Wolverhampton
2015	Michael van Gerwen (100.94)	PDC	16–13	Phil Taylor (102.53)	£400,000	£100,000	£50,000	Civic Hall, Wolverhampton
2016	Michael van Gerwen (98.74)	PDC	16–8	James Wade (90.73)	£400,000	£100,000	£50,000	Civic Hall, Wolverhampton
2017	Michael van Gerwen (102.18)	PDC	16–12	Peter Wright (97.71)	£450,000	£110,000	£55,000	Civic Hall, Wolverhampton
2018	Gerwyn Price (96.70)	PDC	16–13	Gary Anderson (97.25)	£450,000	£110,000	£55,000	WV Active - Aldersley, Wolverhampton
2019	Gerwyn Price (107.86)	PDC	16–6	Peter Wright (96.28)	£550,000	£125,000	£65,000	WV Active - Aldersley, Wolverhampton
2020	José de Sousa (99.95)	PDC	16–12	James Wade (94.26)	£550,000	£125,000	£65,000	Coventry Arena, Coventry
2021	Gerwyn Price (103.90)	PDC	16–8	Peter Wright (91.51)	£550,000	£125,000	£65,000	WV Active - Aldersley, Wolverhampton
2022	Michael Smith (96.84)	PDC	16–5	Nathan Aspinall (90.94)	£650,000	£150,000	£70,000	WV Active - Aldersley, Wolverhampton
2023	Luke Humphries (104.69)	PDC	16–8	Rob Cross (103.61)	£650,000	£150,000	£70,000	WV Active - Aldersley, Wolverhampton
2024	Luke Littler (107.08)	PDC	16–3	Martin Lukeman (93.42)	£650,000	£150,000	£70,000	WV Active - Aldersley, Wolverhampton
2025	Luke Littler (100.61)	PDC	16–11	Luke Humphries (99.56)	£650,000	£150,000	£70,000	WV Active - Aldersley, Wolverhampton
2026	Gerwyn Price (97.34)	PDC	16–11	Gian van Veen (94.76)	£1,000,000	£200,000	£100,000	WV Active - Aldersley, Wolverhampton

== Records and statistics ==
As of 16 November 2025.

=== Total finalist appearances ===
Rank	Player	Nationality	Won	Runner-up	Finals	Appearances
1	Phil Taylor	England	6	1	7	11
2	**Michael van Gerwen**	Netherlands	3	1	4	18
3	**Gerwyn Price**	Wales	3	0	3	9
4	**Luke Littler**	England	2	0	2	2
5	**Scott Waites**	England	1	1	2	6
5	**Luke Humphries**	England	1	1	2	6
7	**Raymond van Barneveld**	Netherlands	1	0	1	14
7	**José de Sousa**	Portugal	1	0	1	2
7	**Michael Smith**	England	1	0	1	12
10	**James Wade**	England	0	3	3	18
10	**Peter Wright**	Scotland	0	3	3	11
12	**Gary Anderson**	Scotland	0	2	2	18
13	Andy Hamilton	England	0	1	1	6
13	Terry Jenkins	England	0	1	1	8
13	Robert Thornton	Scotland	0	1	1	9
13	**Dave Chisnall**	England	0	1	1	11
13	**Nathan Aspinall**	England	0	1	1	6
13	**Rob Cross**	England	0	1	1	8
13	**Martin Lukeman**	England	0	1	1	2

- Active players are shown in **bold**
- Only players who reached the final are included
- In the event of identical records, players are sorted by date first achieved

=== Champions by country ===
Country	Players	Total	First title	Last title
England	5	11	2007	2025
Netherlands	2	4	2012	2017
Wales	1	3	2018	2021
Portugal	1	1	2020	2020

=== Nine-dart finishes ===
Nine nine-darters have been thrown at the Grand Slam of Darts. The first one was in 2008.

Player	Year (+ Round)	Method	Opponent	Result
(England) James Wade	2008, Last 16	3 x T20; 3 x T20; T20, T19, D12	(Scotland) Gary Anderson	Lost
(Belgium) Kim Huybrechts	2014, Quarter-Final	3 x T20; 3 x T20; T20, T19, D12	(Netherlands) Michael van Gerwen	Won
(England) Dave Chisnall	2015, Group Stage	3 x T20; 3 x T20; T20, T19, D12	(Scotland) Peter Wright	Won
(Belgium) Dimitri Van den Bergh	2018, Last 16	3 x T20; 3 x T20; T20, T19, D12	(England) Stephen Bunting	Won
(Northern Ireland) Josh Rock	2022, Last 16	3 x T20; 3 x T20; T20, T19, D12	(Netherlands) Michael van Gerwen	Lost
(England) Ryan Searle	2023, Group Stage	3 x T20; 3 x T20; T20, T19, D12	(Northern Ireland) Nathan Rafferty	Won
(England) Luke Humphries	2025, Group Stage	2 x T20, T19; 3 x T20; T20, T20, D12	(England) Michael Smith	Won
(Netherlands) Michael van Gerwen	2026, Quarter-Final	3 x T20; 3 x T20; T20, T19, D12	(England) Tom Sykes	Won
(England) Tom Sykes	2026, Quarter-Final	3 x T20; 3 x T20; T20, T19, D12	(Netherlands) Michael van Gerwen	Lost

=== High averages ===
Ten highest Grand Slam of Darts one-match winning averages
Average	Player	Year (+ Round)	Opponent	Result
115.19	(Netherlands) Michael van Gerwen	2021, Group Stage	(England) Joe Cullen	5–2
114.85	(Belgium) Dimitri Van den Bergh	2020, Group Stage	(England) Ricky Evans	5–1
114.71	(Netherlands) Gian van Veen	2024, Group Stage	(England) Stephen Bunting	5–1
114.65	(England) Phil Taylor	2014, Group Stage	(Netherlands) Christian Kist	5–1
114.32	(England) Rob Cross	2026, Group Stage	(Wales) Jonny Clayton	5–1
113.86	(Belgium) Geert De Vos	2015, Group Stage	(Wales) Jonny Clayton	5–0
113.62	(England) Michael Smith	2019, Group Stage	(England) Nathan Aspinall	5–1
113.20	(Scotland) Gary Anderson	2024, Group Stage	(England) Ryan Joyce	5–1
112.66	(Netherlands) Michael van Gerwen	2018, Group Stage	(England) Gary Robson	5–1
112.54	(Scotland) Gary Anderson	2018, Group Stage	(England) Ian White	5–1

Five highest one-match losing averages
Average	Player	Year (+ Round)	Opponent	Result
111.10	(Netherlands) Wessel Nijman	2024, Group Stage	(Netherlands) Gian van Veen	4–5
110.99	(England) Adrian Lewis	2013, Semi-Final	(England) Phil Taylor	9–16
109.23	(Northern Ireland) Josh Rock	2025, Group Stage	(Netherlands) Wessel Nijman	4–5
109.15	(Germany) Martin Schindler	2024, Group Stage	(Netherlands) Danny Noppert	2–5
108.68	(England) Adrian Lewis	2016, Group Stage	(England) Chris Dobey	3–5

Different players with a 100+ match average (Updated 21/11/26)
Player	Total	Highest Av.	Year (+ Round)
(Netherlands) Michael van Gerwen	48	115.19	2021, Group Stage
(England) Phil Taylor	45	114.65	2014, Group Stage
(Scotland) Gary Anderson	36	113.20	2024, Group Stage
(Wales) Gerwyn Price	19	112.30	2023, Group Stage
(England) James Wade	18	111.71	2021, Group Stage
(England) Michael Smith	16	113.62	2019, Group Stage
(England) Luke Humphries	16	108.55	2025, Last 16
(England) Luke Littler	15	112.16	2024, Group Stage
(Scotland) Peter Wright	15	107.36	2016, Group Stage
(Netherlands) Raymond van Barneveld	13	110.15	2016, Group Stage
(England) Rob Cross	12	114.32	2026, Group Stage
(England) Adrian Lewis	12	110.99	2013, Semi-Finals
(England) Stephen Bunting	9	106.70	2021, Group Stage
(Netherlands) Gian van Veen	7	114.71	2024, Group Stage
(England) Dave Chisnall	7	109.84	2015, Group Stage
(Australia) Simon Whitlock	7	108.86	2018, Group Stage
(Belgium) Dimitri Van den Bergh	6	114.85	2020, Group Stage
(England) Nathan Aspinall	6	111.68	2026, Group Stage
(Netherlands) Danny Noppert	6	106.28	2024, Group Stage
(England) Scott Waites	6	103.79	2012, Group Stage
(Northern Ireland) Josh Rock	5	109.23	2025, Group Stage
(Austria) Mensur Suljović	5	105.85	2021, Group Stage
(England) Andy Hamilton	5	105.64	2008, Group Stage
(Wales) Jonny Clayton	5	104.30	2021, Last 16
(Netherlands) Wessel Nijman	4	111.10	2024, Group Stage
(Belgium) Kim Huybrechts	4	106.50	2015, Group Stage
(England) Mervyn King	4	104.31	2015, Group Stage
(Poland) Krzysztof Ratajski	4	104.18	2020, Group Stage
(England) Terry Jenkins	4	103.09	2009, Group Stage
(Scotland) Robert Thornton	4	102.42	2012, Last 16
(Germany) Martin Schindler	3	109.15	2024, Group Stage
(England) Ian White	3	108.04	2020, Group Stage
(England) Scott Mitchell	3	107.78	2016, Group Stage
(England) Glen Durrant	3	106.05	2017, Group Stage
(Netherlands) Jermaine Wattimena	3	104.32	2024, Group Stage
(England) Beau Greaves	3	103.82	2026, Group Stage
(England) Keegan Brown	3	103.66	2018, Group Stage
(England) Ryan Searle	3	103.59	2022, Group Stage
(England) Tony O'Shea	3	102.63	2010, Group Stage
(England) Ross Smith	2	107.92	2022, Group Stage
(Germany) Niko Springer	2	105.23	2026, Group Stage
(England) Ritchie Edhouse	2	105.00	2024, Group Stage
(Austria) Rowby-John Rodriguez	2	104.82	2021, Group Stage
(England) Dean Winstanley	2	104.55	2011, Last 16
(Belgium) Mike De Decker	2	104.49	2024, Last 16
(England) Tom Sykes	2	104.30	2026, Group Stage
(Netherlands) Wesley Harms	2	103.98	2018, Group Stage
(England) Ted Hankey	2	103.75	2010, Group Stage
(England) Luke Woodhouse	2	103.61	2025, Group Stage
(Netherlands) Co Stompé	2	103.44	2009, Group Stage
(England) Darren Webster	2	103.44	2017, Group Stage
(Netherlands) Kevin Doets	2	102.63	2026, Quarter-Final
(England) Steve Beaton	2	101.31	2010, Last 16
(Northern Ireland) Daryl Gurney	2	100.80	2019, Group Stage
(Belgium) Geert De Vos	1	113.86	2015, Group Stage
(Germany) Gabriel Clemens	1	110.27	2019, Group Stage
(Netherlands) Roland Scholten	1	110.21	2007, Group Stage
(England) Ryan Joyce	1	108.11	2021, Group Stage
(England) Scott Williams	1	107.46	2022, Group Stage
(England) Jamie Hughes	1	106.32	2016, Group Stage
(England) Kevin McDine	1	105.79	2007, Last 16
(England) Martin Adams	1	104.82	2015, Group Stage
(Netherlands) Jelle Klaasen	1	104.69	2015, Group Stage
(England) Connor Scutt	1	104.38	2024, Group Stage
(England) Dennis Priestley	1	103.53	2007, Group Stage
(England) Cameron Menzies	1	103.39	2026, Group Stage
(Wales) Martin Phillips	1	103.28	2010, Group Stage
(England) Joe Cullen	1	103.22	2026, Group Stage
(Northern Ireland) Nathan Rafferty	1	103.09	2023, Group Stage
(Netherlands) Dirk van Duijvenbode	1	102.89	2022, Group Stage
(England) Wes Newton	1	102.46	2012, Group Stage
(United States) Stowe Buntz	1	102.28	2023, Group Stage
(England) Cam Crabtree	1	102.07	2025, Group Stage
(Netherlands) Maik Kuivenhoven	1	101.62	2026, Group Stage
(Wales) Jim Williams	1	101.60	2018, Group Stage
(England) Colin Lloyd	1	101.55	2009, Group Stage
(England) Fallon Sherrock	1	101.55	2021, Group Stage
(Sweden) Magnus Caris	1	101.52	2011, Group Stage
(England) Andrew Gilding	1	101.52	2018, Group Stage
(England) Wayne Jones	1	101.48	2007, Group Stage
(Wales) Mark Webster	1	101.43	2011, Group Stage
(Netherlands) Niels Zonneveld	1	101.12	2026, Group Stage
(England) Carl Sneyd	1	101.09	2026, Group Stage
(Scotland) Ross Montgomery	1	100.96	2017, Group Stage
(Netherlands) Vincent van der Voort	1	100.92	2010, Group Stage
(Netherlands) Benito van de Pas	1	100.90	2016, Group Stage
(Northern Ireland) Mickey Mansell	1	100.87	2024, Group Stage
(England) Kevin Painter	1	100.74	2009, Group Stage
(England) Mark McGeeney	1	100.40	2017, Group Stage
(Canada) John Part	1	100.38	2009, Group Stage
(England) Tommy Morris	1	100.33	2026, Group Stage
(Republic of Ireland) Steve Lennon	1	100.20	2017, Group Stage
(England) Justin Pipe	1	100.08	2013, Group Stage
(Portugal) José de Sousa	1	100.03	2020, Group Stage

Five highest tournament averages
Average	Player	Year
107.67	(Netherlands) Wessel Nijman	2024
106.58	(Netherlands) Gian van Veen	2024
105.81	(England) Luke Littler	2024
105.42	(Netherlands) Michael van Gerwen	2015
105.12	(Netherlands) Michael van Gerwen	2017

== Previous BDO v PDC tournaments ==
There have been previous tournaments in which players from both the PDC and BDO have competed. Between 1997 and 2001, several BDO players competed in the World Matchplay and the World Grand Prix – this was as a result of a 1997 Tomlin Order which allowed freedom of players to enter more events. This was later restricted from the start of 2002 onwards, when eligibility rules allowed only Professional Dart Players Association members to compete in the tournaments.

The 2005 Masters of Darts was the first tournament to feature the top players from each organisation. In 2006 and 2007, following Raymond van Barneveld's move to the PDC, the Dutch organisers of the International Darts League and World Darts Trophy invited some top PDC players to compete alongside BDO players.

== Perennial participants ==
As the Grand Slam is an invitational tournament for players who have reached major finals and semi-finals, or been the top of their countries' respective rankings, there is a certain degree of prestige attached to qualifying for the tournament, and even more for entrants who qualify multiple times. Gary Anderson and James Wade qualified for 15 successive tournaments between 2007 and 2021, before missing their first event in 2022.

== Television coverage ==
ITV screened the first four editions of the Grand Slam of Darts, which ended their 19-year absence from regular darts coverage (although they did show a one-off Clash of Champions match between Phil Taylor and Raymond van Barneveld in 1999). The inaugural event saw selected first-round games, the semi-finals, and the final all screened live on ITV1 and the rest of the tournament live on ITV4 but the live coverage was moved entirely to ITV4 in subsequent years, with highlights packages being the only coverage of the event on ITV1.

The tournament proved popular on ITV4, with the 2009 event achieving nine out of the top ten places in the channel's output for that week. Viewing figures ranged from 208,000 to 435,000 with the final itself watched by 454,000. ITV extended their contract with the PDC to show the tournament until at least 2010.

The presenting team consisted of lead presenter Matt Smith, and analysts Alan Warriner-Little and Chris Mason (who replaced Steve Beaton in 2008). The commentating team included Stuart Pyke, who also commentates on darts for Sky Sports, boxing commentator John Rawling, and Peter Drury. Janie Omorogbe provided reporting duties and player interviews.

On 25 January 2011, it was announced that Sky Sports would broadcast the event until 2018. Sky continues to air the event with its current deal running until 2025.

== Sponsorship ==
The sponsors of the event were PartyBets.com (2007) and PartyPoker.com (2008–09), websites operated by Bwin.Party Digital Entertainment, the Daily Mirror newspaper (2010), William Hill (2011–13), Singha Beer (2014–16), bwin (2017–18) and BoyleSports (2019–2020). Cazoo took over as sponsors from 2021, as part of a deal where they will also sponsor the PDC World Cup of Darts and the European Championship. In October 2023, Mr Vegas was named as title sponsor.
