= 2014 World Series of Darts =

The 2014 World Series of Darts was the second staging of the World Series of Darts tour organised by the Professional Darts Corporation. There were four events of the tour, held in Dubai, Singapore, Perth, and Sydney. The four tournaments featured two different formats. They all featured the top six players on the Order of Merit joined by two PDC wildcards. The Perth and Sydney tournaments also featured eight regional qualifiers.

== Prize money ==
The total prize fund for the tour was £396,000.

Stage (no. of players)		Prize money	
Stage (no. of players)		Dubai/Singapore	Perth/Sydney
Winner	(1)	£30,000	£20,000
Runner-up	(1)	£25,000	£10,000
Semi-finalists	(2)	£15,000	£7,500
Quarter-finalists	(4)	£10,000	£5,000
First round	(8)	—N/a	£1,000

== World Series events ==
No.	Date	Event	Venue	Winner	Legs	Runner-up	Ref.
1	29–30 May	Dubai Masters	(United Arab Emirates) Dubai, Dubai Tennis Centre	Michael van Gerwen (Netherlands)	11–7	(Scotland) Peter Wright	
2	15–16 August	Singapore Masters	Singapore, Singapore Indoor Stadium	Michael van Gerwen (Netherlands)	11–8	(Australia) Simon Whitlock	
3	22–24 August	Perth Masters	(Australia) Perth, HBF Stadium	Phil Taylor (England)	11–9	(Netherlands) Michael van Gerwen	
4	28–30 August	Sydney Masters	(Australia) Sydney, Hordern Pavilion	Phil Taylor (England)	11–3	(England) Stephen Bunting	

== Quarter-finalists ==
Player	Earnings	Dubai Masters	Singapore Masters	Perth Masters	Sydney Masters
(Netherlands) Michael van Gerwen	£71,000	Winner	Winner	Runner up	First round
(England) Phil Taylor	£60,000	Quarter-finalist	Quarter-finalist	Winner	Winner
(Scotland) Peter Wright	£45,000	Runner up	Quarter-finalist	Quarter-finalist	Quarter-finalist
(Australia) Simon Whitlock	£45,000	Quarter-finalist	Runner up	Quarter-finalist	Quarter-finalist
(England) Dave Chisnall	£42,500	Semi-finalist	Semi-finalist	Semi-finalist	Quarter-finalist
(England) James Wade	£40,000	Quarter-finalist	Semi-finalist	Semi-finalist	Semi-finalist
(Netherlands) Raymond van Barneveld	£26,000	Quarter-finalist	Quarter-finalist	Quarter-finalist	First round
(England) Adrian Lewis	£15,000	Semi-finalist	Withdrew	Withdrew	Withdrew
(England) Stephen Bunting	£10,000	Did not qualify	Did not qualify	Did not qualify	Runner up
(England) Andy Hamilton	£10,000	Did not qualify	Quarter-finalist	Did not qualify	Did not qualify
(Australia) Kyle Anderson	£8,500	Did not qualify	Did not qualify	First round	Semi-finalist
(Australia) Paul Nicholson	£6,000	Did not qualify	Did not qualify	Quarter-finalist	First round
(New Zealand) Warren Parry	£6,000	Did not qualify	Did not qualify	First round	Quarter-finalist
