= 2013 World Series of Darts =

Series of darts tournaments

The 2013 World Series of Darts was the inaugural tour of the World Series of Darts organised by the Professional Darts Corporation. There were two events of the tour, the Dubai Duty Free Darts Masters and the Sydney Darts Masters. The two tournaments featured slightly different formats. The Dubai Masters only seeing the top eight Order of Merit players in a seeded bracket over two days, with the Sydney masters seeing the top eight being joined by eight regional qualifiers.

== World Series events ==
No.	Date	Event	Venue	Winner	Legs	Runner-up	Ref.
1	23–24 May	Dubai Masters	(United Arab Emirates) Dubai, Dubai Tennis Centre	Michael van Gerwen (Netherlands)	11–7	(Netherlands) Raymond van Barneveld	
2	29–31 August	Sydney Masters	(Australia) Sydney, Luna Park	Phil Taylor (England)	10–3	(Netherlands) Michael van Gerwen	

== Quarter-finalists ==
Player	Dubai Masters	Sydney Masters
(Netherlands) Michael van Gerwen	Winner	Runner up
(England) Phil Taylor	Quarter-finalist	Winner
(Netherlands) Raymond van Barneveld	Runner up	First round
(England) Andy Hamilton	Semi-finalist	Quarter-finalist
(England) James Wade	Semi-finalist	Suspended
(England) Adrian Lewis	Quarter-finalist	Semi-finalist
(Australia) Simon Whitlock	Quarter-finalist	Semi-finalist
(England) Wes Newton	Quarter-finalist	Quarter-finalist
(Australia) Paul Nicholson	Did not qualify	Quarter-finalist
(Australia) Tic Bridge	Did not qualify	Quarter-finalist
