= 2013 Players Championship Finals =

2013 Cash Converters Players Championship Finals

Tournament information
- Dates: 29 November–1 December 2013
- Venue: Butlin's Minehead
- Location: Minehead, England
- Organisation(s): Professional Darts Corporation (PDC)
- Format: Legs
- Prize fund: £250,000
- Winner's share: £60,000
- High checkout: 170 Michael van Gerwen

Champion(s)
- (Netherlands) Michael van Gerwen

The 2013 Cash Converters Players Championship Finals was the sixth edition of the PDC darts tournament, the Players Championship Finals, which saw the top 32 players from the 2013 PDC Pro Tour Order of Merit taking part. The tournament took place from 29 November to 1 December 2013 at the Butlin's Resort in Minehead, England.

Defending champion, Phil Taylor, who had a superb 2013 in winning the World Championship, the UK Open, the World Matchplay, the Sydney Darts Masters, the World Grand Prix, the Championship League, the Masters and the Grand Slam of Darts, looked on course to win the 2013 Players Championship also, when he led Michael van Gerwen 6–3 in the final. However, Taylor then fell victim to one of van Gerwen's purple patches as van Gerwen came back to win 11–7 and take the 2013 Players Championship title.

== Prize money ==
Position (no. of players)		Prize money (Total: £250,000)
Winner	(1)	£60,000
Runner-Up	(1)	£24,000
Semi-finalists	(2)	£15,000
Quarter-finalists	(4)	£10,000
Last 16 (second round)	(8)	£6,000
Last 32 (first round)	(16)	£3,000

== Qualification ==
This is the final ProTour Order of Merit for 2013 after all Players Championship events, UK Open Qualifiers and European Tour events had been played:

1. (Netherlands) Michael van Gerwen (champion)
2. (England) Dave Chisnall (first round)
3. (Scotland) Peter Wright (second round)
4. (Northern Ireland) Brendan Dolan (second round)
5. (Belgium) Kim Huybrechts (first round)
6. (Scotland) Robert Thornton (second round)
7. (England) Jamie Caven (second round)
8. (England) Steve Beaton (first round)
9. (England) Wes Newton (quarter-finals)
10. (Australia) Simon Whitlock (first round)
11. (England) Mervyn King (first round)
12. (England) Ian White (quarter-finals)
13. (Canada) John Part (first round)
14. (Australia) Paul Nicholson (first round)
15. (Scotland) Gary Anderson (quarter-finals)
16. (England) Adrian Lewis (second round)
17. (England) Kevin Painter (first round)
18. (England) Stuart Kellett (first round)
19. (England) Phil Taylor (runner-up)
20. (England) Andy Hamilton (semi-finals)
21. (England) Ronnie Baxter (first round)
22. (Netherlands) Raymond van Barneveld (quarter-finals)
23. (England) Justin Pipe (semi-finals)
24. (England) Andy Smith (first round)
25. (England) James Wade (first round)
26. (England) Colin Lloyd (first round)
27. (Wales) Richie Burnett (first round)
28. (England) Terry Jenkins (second round)
29. (England) Wayne Jones (first round)
30. (England) Michael Smith (first round)
31. (Netherlands) Jelle Klaasen (second round)
32. (Wales) Jamie Lewis (first round)

== Draw ==
The playing distance from the second round onwards has been reduced with respect to 2012. From the best of 19, 19, 21 and 25 legs to 17, 17, 19 and 21 legs.

First round (best of 11 legs); 29 November
1	(Netherlands) Michael van Gerwen 89.50	6
32	(Wales) Jamie Lewis 85.11	1
16	(England) Adrian Lewis 94.62	6
17	(England) Kevin Painter 94.05	3
8	(England) Steve Beaton 99.14	6
25	(England) James Wade 100.72	5
9	(England) Wes Newton 96.91	6
24	(England) Andy Smith 94.74	2
5	(Belgium) Kim Huybrechts 92.72	2
28	(England) Terry Jenkins 93.20	6
12	(England) Ian White 93.70	6
21	(England) Ronnie Baxter 86.18	3
4	(Northern Ireland) Brendan Dolan 89.63	6
29	(England) Wayne Jones 94.30	5
13	(Canada) John Part 81.83	5
20	(England) Andy Hamilton 75.05	6
2	(England) Dave Chisnall 94.22	4
31	(Netherlands) Jelle Klaasen 86.74	6
15	(Scotland) Gary Anderson 95.31	6
18	(England) Stuart Kellett 90.61	5
7	(England) Jamie Caven 91.55	6
26	(England) Colin Lloyd 88.51	3
10	(Australia) Simon Whitlock 90.16	4
23	(England) Justin Pipe 92.84	6
6	(Scotland) Robert Thornton 104.21	6
27	(Wales) Richie Burnett 93.43	3
11	(England) Mervyn King 96.70	5
22	(Netherlands) Raymond van Barneveld 95.60	6
3	(Scotland) Peter Wright 101.54	6
30	(England) Michael Smith 95.30	2
14	(Australia) Paul Nicholson 86.25	2
19	(England) Phil Taylor 93.68	6

Second round (best of 17 legs); 30 November
1	(Netherlands) Michael van Gerwen 107.00	9
16	(England) Adrian Lewis 104.48	6
8	(England) Steve Beaton 81.41	3
9	(England) Wes Newton 93.96	9
28	(England) Terry Jenkins 85.73	2
12	(England) Ian White 97.71	9
4	(Northern Ireland) Brendan Dolan 90.72	3
20	(England) Andy Hamilton 90.73	9
31	(Netherlands) Jelle Klaasen 82.94	5
15	(Scotland) Gary Anderson 88.13	9
7	(England) Jamie Caven 94.60	4
23	(England) Justin Pipe 89.70	9
6	(Scotland) Robert Thornton 89.76	8
22	(Netherlands) Raymond van Barneveld 89.93	9
3	(Scotland) Peter Wright 94.07	3
19	(England) Phil Taylor 107.85	9

Quarter-finals (best of 17 legs); 1 December
1	(Netherlands) Michael van Gerwen 102.51	9
9	(England) Wes Newton 95.72	4
12	(England) Ian White 89.54	6
20	(England) Andy Hamilton 92.81	9
15	(Scotland) Gary Anderson 93.28	7
23	(England) Justin Pipe 95.32	9
22	(Netherlands) Raymond van Barneveld 94.66	2
19	(England) Phil Taylor 111.58	9

Semi-finals (best of 19 legs); 1 December
1	(Netherlands) Michael van Gerwen 96.20	10
20	(England) Andy Hamilton 96.09	5
23	(England) Justin Pipe 95.78	4
19	(England) Phil Taylor 106.09	10

Final (best of 21 legs); 1 December
1	(Netherlands) Michael van Gerwen 102.45	11
19	(England) Phil Taylor 102.64	7

== Statistics ==
Player	Eliminated	Played	Legs Won	Legs Lost	LWAT	100+	140+	180s	High checkout	3-dart average
(Netherlands) Michael van Gerwen	Winner	5	45	23	17	75	61	19	170	99.53
(England) Phil Taylor	Final	5	41	22	13	73	54	15	143	104.37
(England) Justin Pipe	Semi-finals	4	28	25	7	71	43	11	120	93.41
(England) Andy Hamilton	Semi-finals	4	29	24	9	53	32	11	160	88.67
(England) Wes Newton	Quarter-finals	3	19	14	8	46	19	13	141	95.53
(England) Ian White	Quarter-finals	3	21	14	7	53	18	8	100	93.72
(Netherlands) Raymond van Barneveld	Quarter-finals	3	17	22	7	44	31	9	111	93.40
(Scotland) Gary Anderson	Quarter-finals	3	22	19	7	42	38	6	101	92.24
(England) Adrian Lewis	Second round	2	12	12	4	27	12	11	88	99.55
(Scotland) Peter Wright	Second round	2	9	11	7	28	16	5	62	97.81
(Scotland) Robert Thornton	Second round	2	14	12	4	27	20	7	99	96.99
(England) Jamie Caven	Second round	2	10	12	3	20	19	8	127	93.08
(England) Steve Beaton	Second round	2	9	14	1	24	19	3	145	90.28
(Northern Ireland) Brendan Dolan	Second round	2	9	14	1	29	18	2	126	90.18
(England) Terry Jenkins	Second round	2	8	11	3	16	11	7	84	89.47
(Netherlands) Jelle Klaasen	Second round	2	11	12	5	23	6	4	135	84.84
(England) James Wade	First round	1	5	6	1	18	8	2	80	100.72
(England) Mervyn King	First round	1	5	6	2	12	12	3	140	96.70
(England) Michael Smith	First round	1	2	6	2	8	4	4	11	95.30
(England) Andy Smith	First round	1	2	6	1	13	6	1	80	94.74
(England) Wayne Jones	First round	1	5	6	1	18	9	3	80	94.30
(England) Dave Chisnall	First round	1	3	6	2	14	3	6	65	94.22
(England) Kevin Painter	First round	1	3	6	1	11	4	3	126	94.05
(Wales) Richie Burnett	First round	1	3	6	0	9	8	2	78	93.43
(Belgium) Kim Huybrechts	First round	1	2	6	1	14	4	1	52	92.72
(England) Stuart Kellett	First round	1	5	6	2	14	5	3	52	90.61
(Australia) Simon Whitlock	First round	1	4	6	1	9	4	2	82	90.16
(England) Colin Lloyd	First round	1	3	6	1	11	5	1	64	88.51
(Australia) Paul Nicholson	First round	1	2	6	0	6	6	3	16	86.25
(England) Ronnie Baxter	First round	1	3	6	1	13	3	1	40	86.18
(Wales) Jamie Lewis	First round	1	1	6	1	8	6	1	5	85.11
(Canada) John Part	First round	1	5	6	2	12	5	3	52	81.83

Source: Match reports in the draw
