= 2017 Shanghai Darts Masters =

Tournament information
- Dates: 6–7 July 2017
- Venue: Pullman Hotel Shanghai South
- Location: Shanghai
- Country: China
- Organisation(s): PDC
- Format: Legs; Final – best of 15 legs
- Prize fund: £60,000
- Winner's share: £20,000
- High checkout: 170 Michael van Gerwen

Champion(s)
- (Netherlands) Michael van Gerwen

The 2017 Shanghai Darts Masters was the second staging of the tournament by the Professional Darts Corporation, as a second entry in the 2017 World Series of Darts. The tournament featured eight Asian players who faced eight PDC players and was held at the Pullman Hotel Shanghai South in Shanghai, China from 6–7 July 2017.

Michael van Gerwen was the defending champion, and he retained his title by beating Dave Chisnall 8–0 in the final.

== Prize money ==
The total prize fund was £60,000.

Position (no. of players)		Prize money (Total: £60,000)
Winner	(1)	£20,000
Runner-up	(1)	£10,000
Semi-finalists	(2)	£5,000
Quarter-finalists	(4)	£2,500
First round	(8)	£1,250

== Qualifiers ==
Eight PDC players – the top eight from the 2017 Premier League – were initially invited. Adrian Lewis subsequently pulled out and was replaced by Gerwyn Price, meaning that the eight players invited were the same as had been invited for the previous World Series event, the 2017 Dubai Duty Free Darts Masters. They are seeded according to the World Series Order of Merit:

1. (Scotland) Gary Anderson (quarter-finals)
2. (Netherlands) Michael van Gerwen (winner)
3. (Scotland) Peter Wright (quarter-finals)
4. (Wales) Gerwyn Price (quarter-finals)
5. (England) Dave Chisnall (runner-up)
6. (England) James Wade (semi-finals)
7. (England) Phil Taylor (quarter-finals)
8. (Netherlands) Raymond van Barneveld (semi-finals)

The following Asian players were invited:

- (Singapore) Paul Lim (first round)
- (Japan) Haruki Muramatsu (first round)
- (Hong Kong) Royden Lam (first round)
- (South Korea) Hyun-chul Park (first round)

The Chinese qualifiers were:

- (China) Chengan Liu (first round)
- (China) Li Wei Hong (first round)
- (China) Zong Xiao Chen (first round)
- (China) Chen Hai Long (first round)

== Draw ==
First round (best of 11 legs); 6 July
1	(Scotland) Gary Anderson 108.65	6
(China) Wei Hong Li 75.54	0
(Netherlands) Raymond van Barneveld 83.50	6
(China) Chengan Liu 69.14	0
4	(Wales) Gerwyn Price 94.07	6
(Hong Kong) Royden Lam 83.80	2
(England) Dave Chisnall 97.43	6
(Singapore) Paul Lim 89.77	1
2	(Netherlands) Michael van Gerwen 112.73	6
(China) Hai Long Chen 64.20	0
(England) Phil Taylor 104.21	6
(South Korea) HyunChul Park 76.70	1
3	(Scotland) Peter Wright 106.09	6
(Japan) Haruki Muramatsu 82.00	0
(England) James Wade 81.24	6
(China) Zong Xiao Chen 66.94	0

Quarter-finals (best of 15 legs); 7 July
1	(Scotland) Gary Anderson 91.31	1
(Netherlands) Raymond van Barneveld 97.94	8
4	(Wales) Gerwyn Price 96.88	4
(England) Dave Chisnall 103.37	8
2	(Netherlands) Michael van Gerwen 100.85	8
(England) Phil Taylor 96.32	7
3	(Scotland) Peter Wright 98.05	5
(England) James Wade 95.43	8

Semi-finals (best of 15 legs); 7 July
(Netherlands) Raymond van Barneveld 90.83	4
(England) Dave Chisnall 96.63	8
2	(Netherlands) Michael van Gerwen 99.84	8
(England) James Wade 97.03	3

Final (best of 15 legs); 7 July
(England) Dave Chisnall 83.39	0
2	(Netherlands) Michael van Gerwen 102.77	8
