= Tic Bridge =

Australian professional darts player

Personal information
- Full name: Clinton Bridge
- Nickname: Tic Tic Boom
- Born: 30 November 1983 (age 42) Geelong, Australia
- Home town: Geelong, Australia

Sport
- Sport: Darts
- Playing since: 2012
- Darts: 24g Shot Darts Signature
- Laterality: Right-handed
- Walk-on music: "OMG" by Usher feat. Will.i.am

Organisation (see split in darts)
- PDC: 2013–

WDF major events – best performances
- World Masters: Last 272: 2017

Other tournament wins
- Years
DPA Pro Tour	2017
Goulburn Open	2012
Kirribilli Club Open	2014
Redcliffe Darts Open	2013 (x2)
Victoria Easter Classic	2017

Clinton "Tic" Bridge (born 30 November 1983) is an Australian professional darts player who plays in Professional Darts Corporation (PDC) events.

A bricklayer by trade, Bridge has mainly played on the Dartplayers Australia (DPA) Tour.

His first big exposure was qualifying for the 2013 Sydney Darts Masters, where he became the first qualifier to knock out a PDC seeded player, when he defeated Raymond van Barneveld 6–5, he would then lose 8–1 to Michael van Gerwen in the quarter-finals.

He has qualified for other World Series of Darts, but has always been knocked out in the first round to players including Phil Taylor and Dave Chisnall.
