= Warren Parry =

New Zealand darts player

Personal information
- Nickname: "Wazza"
- Born: 9 January 1964 (age 62) Wreys Bush, New Zealand
- Home town: Invercargill, New Zealand

Sport
- Sport: Darts
- Playing since: 1987
- Darts: 21 Gram Shot Signature
- Laterality: Right-handed
- Walk-on music: "Roadhouse Blues" by The Doors

Organisation (see split in darts)
- BDO: 1993–2005
- PDC: 2005–
- WDF: 2020–

PDC premier events – best performances
- World Championship: Last 64: 2006, 2008, 2010

Other tournament wins
- Years
Alan King Memorial	2014
Canterbury Classic	2021
New Zealand Masters	2007, 2021
New Zealand Open	1999, 2000, 2005
Oceanic Masters	2005, 2007, 2009
South Island Masters	2013, 2016
Sydney Masters	2013, 2015
DPNZ Porirua Open	2014
DPNZ Wainuiomata Open	2013
PDC New Zealand Qualifier	2016
Medal record
Men's Darts
Representing New Zealand
WDF Asia-Pacific Cup
Gold medal – first place	2000 Manila	Men's singles
Gold medal – first place	2000 Manila	Team event
Gold medal – first place	2004 Singapore	Team event
Silver medal – second place	2002 Bangkok	Team event
Silver medal – second place	2004 Singapore	Men's singles
Silver medal – second place	2006 Kuala Lumpur	Men's singles
Bronze medal – third place	2000 Manila	Men's pairs
Bronze medal – third place	2002 Bangkok	Men's pairs
Bronze medal – third place	2004 Singapore	Men's pairs
Bronze medal – third place	2006 Kuala Lumpur	Men's pairs
Bronze medal – third place	2006 Kuala Lumpur	Team event

Warren "Wazza" Parry (born 9 January 1964) is a New Zealand professional darts player who competed in World Darts Federation (WDF) events.

== Career ==
Parry reached the final of the 1999 WDF World Cup Men's Singles event, beating Marko Kantele in the last 16, Andy Fordham in the quarter-finals and fellow New Zealander Herbie Nathan in the semis before losing to Raymond van Barneveld 4–1. Parry then went on to win the 2000 WDF Asia-Pacific Cup. Despite losing his opening group game to Australia's Tony David, Parry won his next two group games to secure qualification for the knockout stage. He defeated Malaysia's Tengku Hadzali Shah 4–3 to win the trophy. During that time, Warren won the New Zealand Open back to back in 1999 and 2000. He went on to win it again in 2005.

Parry won the 2005 Oceanic Masters beating Russell Stewart 6–2 in the final. This earned him a place in the 2006 PDC World Championship at the Circus Tavern in Purfleet. He lost in the first round 3–0 to Mark Walsh. Parry reached the final of the 2006 WDF Asia-Pacific Cup, but lost 4–3 to Amin Abdul Ghani and beat Neville Moss 5–3 to claim the 2007 New Zealand Masters. Also in 2007, Parry claimed his second Oceanic Masters title and made his second appearance in the PDC World Championship in 2008 which moved from the Circus Tavern to the larger Alexandra Palace. He was drawn against Alex Roy in the first round, narrowly losing by three sets to two.

Parry won the 2009 Oceanic Masters and won a spot in the World Championship for the third time. He played five-time world champion Raymond van Barneveld in the first round, but was beaten 3–0.

In 2013, Parry won the Southland Masters by defeating Stephen Padget 5–2 in the final. Later in the year he won the DartPlayers New Zealand Qualifier for the inaugural Sydney Darts Masters, a tournament which formed the new World Series of Darts. He faced Paul Nicholson in the first round and lost 6–4. Parry also won the Wainuiomata Open courtesy of a 7–5 victory over Greg Moss.

In 2014, Parry participated in the inaugural Perth Darts Masters and lost 6–1 against Nicholson in the first round. A week later he qualified for the Sydney Darts Masters as New Zealand's number one player and recorded the biggest win of his career by coming back from 5–1 to beat world number one and reigning world champion Michael van Gerwen 6–5. Parry played James Wade in the quarter-finals and was defeated 8–2.

Parry won through to the final of the 2015 South Island Masters, where he lost 6–2 to Peter Hunt. Parry played with Rob Szabo in the 2015 World Cup and they secured New Zealand's first win in the event since 2010 by knocking out Canada 5–4. They faced Northern Ireland in the second round with Szabo losing 4–1 to Brendan Dolan and Parry losing 4–0 to Mickey Mansell to exit the tournament. Parry qualified for his third Sydney Darts Masters, but was whitewashed 6–0 by Gary Anderson in round one. He won through to the final of the Oceanic Masters, but lost 8–4 to Koha Kokiri.

In 2016, Parry secured the South Island Masters title by beating Graeme Ryder in the final. Parry and new partner Cody Harris moved 3–1 up on Scotland in the first round of the World Cup, but they lost 5–3. Parry and Harris contested the final of the DPA Australian Matchplay, with Harris prevailing 6–5. He was also edged out in the final of the Alan King Memorial 5–4 by Mark McGrath.

Parry won the New Zealand Qualifier for the 2017 World Championship with a 7–3 success over Rob Szabo in the final. He lost 2–0 in the preliminary round to Jerry Hendriks with both sets going to deciding legs.

== World Championship results ==
=== PDC ===
- 2006: First round (lost to Mark Walsh 0–3) (sets)
- 2008: First round (lost to Alex Roy 2–3)
- 2010: First round (lost to Raymond van Barneveld 0–3)
- 2017: Preliminary round (lost to Jerry Hendriks 0–2)
