= 2014 Dubai Duty Free Darts Masters =

Tournament information
- Dates: 29–30 May 2014
- Venue: Dubai Tennis Centre
- Location: Dubai
- Country: United Arab Emirates
- Organisation(s): PDC
- Format: Legs; Final – best of 21 legs
- Prize fund: £125,000
- Winner's share: £30,000

Champion(s)
- (Netherlands) Michael van Gerwen

The 2014 Dubai Duty Free Darts Masters was the second staging of the tournament organised by the Professional Darts Corporation. It was the first World Series of Darts event of 2014. The tournament featured the top six players according to the Order of Merit, plus two wildcards, competing in a knockout system. The tournament was held at the Dubai Tennis Centre in Dubai over 29–30 May 2014.

Michael van Gerwen was the defending champion and he retained his title by defeating Peter Wright 11–7 in the final.

== Prize money ==
The total prize fund was £125,000.

Position (no. of players)		Prize money (Total: £125,000)
Winner	(1)	£30,000
Runner-up	(1)	£25,000
Semi-finalists	(2)	£15,000
Quarter-finalists	(4)	£10,000

== Qualifiers ==
The top six players on the PDC Order of Merit after the 2014 World Championship qualified for the event, with the top 4 seeded. They were joined by two wildcards. These were:

1. (Netherlands) Michael van Gerwen (winner)
2. (England) Phil Taylor (quarter-finals)
3. (Australia) Simon Whitlock (quarter-finals)
4. (England) Adrian Lewis (semi-finals)
5. (England) Dave Chisnall (semi-finals)
6. (England) James Wade (quarter-finals)

Wildcards:

- (Scotland) Peter Wright (runner-up)
- (Netherlands) Raymond van Barneveld (quarter-finals)

== Draw ==
Quarter-finals (best of 19 legs); 29 May
1	(Netherlands) Michael van Gerwen 101.89	10
(England) James Wade 95.40	9
4	(England) Adrian Lewis 97.72	10
(Netherlands) Raymond van Barneveld 94.49	5
2	(England) Phil Taylor 91.72	5
(Scotland) Peter Wright 95.55	10
3	(Australia) Simon Whitlock 100.54	8
(England) Dave Chisnall 101.98	10

Semi-finals (best of 21 legs); 30 May
1	(Netherlands) Michael van Gerwen 99.97	11
4	(England) Adrian Lewis 92.19	7
(Scotland) Peter Wright 87.67	11
(England) Dave Chisnall 87.14	8

Final (best of 21 legs); 30 May
1	(Netherlands) Michael van Gerwen 97.06	11
(Scotland) Peter Wright 89.91	7

== Statistics ==
Player	Eliminated	Played	Legs Won	Legs Lost	LWAT	100+	140+	180s	3-dart Average
(Netherlands) Michael van Gerwen	Winner	3	32	23	12	77	26	23	99.64
(Scotland) Peter Wright	Runner-up	3	28	24	10	69	42	8	91.04
(England) Adrian Lewis	Semi-finals	2	17	16	6	35	22	10	94.96
(England) Dave Chisnall	Semi-finals	2	18	19	7	30	34	13	94.56
(Australia) Simon Whitlock	Quarter-finals	1	8	10	3	22	9	9	100.54
(England) James Wade	Quarter-finals	1	9	10	3	24	14	2	95.40
(Netherlands) Raymond van Barneveld	Quarter-finals	1	5	10	1	24	8	3	94.49
(England) Phil Taylor	Quarter-finals	1	5	10	2	17	5	3	91.72

Source: Match reports from the draw.

== Broadcasting ==
The tournament was available in the following territories on these channels:

Country	Channel
United Kingdom	Sky Sports
(Emirate of Dubai) Dubai	Dubai Sports TV
Middle East	OSN
Australia	Fox Sports
New Zealand	Sky Sport (New Zealand)
