= 2017 Dubai Duty Free Darts Masters =

Tournament information
- Dates: 24–25 May 2017
- Venue: Dubai Tennis Centre
- Location: Dubai
- Country: United Arab Emirates
- Organisation(s): PDC
- Format: Legs; Final – best of 21 legs
- Prize fund: £50,000
- Winner's share: £20,000
- High checkout: 170 Raymond van Barneveld

Champion(s)
- (Scotland) Gary Anderson

The 2017 Dubai Duty Free Darts Masters was the fifth staging of the tournament organised by the Professional Darts Corporation. It was the first World Series of Darts event of 2017. The tournament featured eight of the top players according to the PDC Order of Merit, competing in a knockout system. The tournament was held at the Dubai Tennis Centre in Dubai over 24–25 May 2017.

Gary Anderson was the title defender after beating Michael van Gerwen 11–9 in the last year's final. He successfully defended his title in a rematch, this time 11–7.

The combined average in the final was 221.34, the highest total in a televised PDC final, beating the previous best of 217.15 by Phil Taylor and Adrian Lewis in the 2013 World Matchplay final.

== Prize money ==
The total prize fund was £50,000.

Position (no. of players)		Prize money (Total: £50,000)
Winner	(1)	£20,000
Runner-up	(1)	£10,000
Semi-finalists	(2)	£5,000
Quarter-finalists	(4)	£2,500

== Qualifiers ==
Eight players were invited by the Professional Darts Corporation were selected to compete. 5 of the top 6 players in the PDC Order of Merit prior to the event were invited - reigning event champion Gary Anderson, 2017 world champion Michael van Gerwen, 2017 UK Open winner Peter Wright, James Wade & Dave Chisnall - as were two former world champions - the sixteen-time champion Phil Taylor and five-time champion Raymond van Barneveld. The 2017 UK Open runner-up Gerwyn Price was the eighth player invited, making his World Series of Darts debut. Price was the only player not to have featured in the 2016 Dubai Duty Free Darts Masters event.

The top four players going into the event were seeded and were kept apart for the first round.

1. (Netherlands) Michael van Gerwen (runner-up)
2. (Scotland) Gary Anderson (champion)
3. (Scotland) Peter Wright (semi-finals)
4. (England) James Wade (quarter-finals)

The other four players were unseeded and drawn randomly among the top four seeds for the first round.

- (England) Dave Chisnall (quarter-finals)
- (Wales) Gerwyn Price (semi-finals)
- (England) Phil Taylor (quarter-finals)
- (Netherlands) Raymond van Barneveld (quarter-finals)

== Draw ==
Quarter-finals (best of 19 legs); 24 May
1	(Netherlands) Michael van Gerwen 104.87	10
(Netherlands) Raymond van Barneveld 101.20	5
4	(England) James Wade 88.96	9
(Wales) Gerwyn Price 95.25	10
2	(Scotland) Gary Anderson 99.26	10
(England) Phil Taylor 90.36	3
3	(Scotland) Peter Wright 101.57	10
(England) Dave Chisnall 99.37	5

Semi-finals (best of 21 legs); 25 May
1	(Netherlands) Michael van Gerwen 96.91	11
(Wales) Gerwyn Price 88.84	3
2	(Scotland) Gary Anderson 99.29	11
3	(Scotland) Peter Wright 91.91	8

Final (best of 21 legs); 25 May
1	(Netherlands) Michael van Gerwen 110.46	7
2	(Scotland) Gary Anderson 110.88	11

== Broadcasting ==
The tournament was available in the following territories on these channels.

Country	Channel
United Kingdom	ITV4 (delayed coverage)
Republic of Ireland	Setanta Sports
Middle East and North Africa	OSN
Australia	Fox Sports
New Zealand	Sky Sport (New Zealand)
Netherlands	RTL7
Asia	Fox Sports
Czech Republic Slovakia	Nova Sport 2
Germany Japan	DAZN
Scandinavia	Viasat
China	CCTV & Madison
South Africa & Sub-Saharan Africa	Kwese
United States	Eleven
