= 2013 Sydney Darts Masters =

Tournament information
- Dates: 29–31 August 2013
- Venue: Luna Park
- Location: Sydney
- Country: Australia
- Organisation(s): PDC
- Format: Legs; Final – best of 19
- Prize fund: £73,000
- Winner's share: £20,000
- High checkout: 134 (England) Phil Taylor

Champion(s)
- (England) Phil Taylor

The 2013 Sydney Darts Masters was the inaugural staging of the tournament by the Professional Darts Corporation, as a second entry in the new World Series of Darts after the 2013 Dubai Duty Free Darts Masters. The tournament featured the top eight players according to the Order of Merit and eight qualifiers competing in a knockout system.

Phil Taylor won the event by defeating Michael van Gerwen 10–3 in the final.

== Prize money ==
The total prize fund was £73,000.

Position (no. of players)		Prize money (Total: £73,000)
Winner	(1)	£20,000
Runner-up	(1)	£10,000
Semi-finalists	(2)	£7,500
Quarter-finalists	(4)	£5,000
First round	(8)	£1,000

== Qualifiers ==
The top eight of the PDC Order of Merit in June 2013 qualified for the event. These were:

1. (England) Phil Taylor (winner)
2. (Netherlands) Michael van Gerwen (runner-up)
3. (England) Adrian Lewis (semi-finals)
4. ~~(England) James Wade (withdrew)~~
  (Australia) Simon Whitlock (semi-finals)
5. (England) Andy Hamilton (quarter-finals)
6. (England) Wes Newton (quarter-finals)
7. (Netherlands) Raymond van Barneveld (first round)
8. (Australia) Paul Nicholson (quarter-finals)

James Wade was suspended by the PDC for bringing the game into disrepute and was replaced by world number 19 and Australian World Cup player Paul Nicholson. Nicholson was already entered into the tournament as he received a DPA invitation but he was now the number eight seed. An additional place was therefore on offer to the leading non-qualified player from the Oceanic Masters.

The regional qualifiers are:

Qualification	Player
2013 DPA Australian Grand Prix Order of Merit Winner	(Australia) Kyle Anderson (first round)
2013 DPA Australian Grand Prix Order of Merit Runner-up	(Australia) Gordon Mathers (first round)
2013 DPA Australian Grand Prix Order of Merit Third place	(Australia) Tic Bridge (quarter-finals)
DPNZ Qualifier	(New Zealand) Warren Parry (first round)
Winner of DPA Qualifier 1	(Australia) Beau Anderson (first round)
Winner of DPA Qualifier 2	(New Zealand) Monty Tuhua (first round)
Winner of DPA Qualifier 3	(Australia) David Platt (first round)
Leading non-qualified player from DPA Oceanic Masters	(Australia) Jamie Mathers (first round)

== Draw ==
First round (best of 11 legs); 29 August
1	(England) Phil Taylor 98.19	6
(Australia) Kyle Anderson 79.35	1
8	(Australia) Paul Nicholson 78.23	6
(New Zealand) Warren Parry 69.90	4
5	(England) Andy Hamilton 90.04	6
(Australia) Beau Anderson 86.22	4
4	(Australia) Simon Whitlock 100.20	6
(Australia) Jamie Mathers 80.14	0
2	(Netherlands) Michael van Gerwen 106.09	6
(Australia) Gordon Mathers 82.70	0
7	(Netherlands) Raymond van Barneveld 85.64	5
(Australia) Tic Bridge 83.77	6
6	(England) Wes Newton 91.72	6
(Australia) David Platt 86.01	3
3	(England) Adrian Lewis 103.70	6
(New Zealand) Monty Tuhua 80.06	1

Quarter-finals (best of 15 legs); 30 August
1	(England) Phil Taylor 108.31	8
8	(Australia) Paul Nicholson 94.36	2
5	(England) Andy Hamilton 81.26	1
4	(Australia) Simon Whitlock 99.82	8
2	(Netherlands) Michael van Gerwen 93.87	8
(Australia) Tic Bridge 81.97	1
6	(England) Wes Newton 97.19	5
3	(England) Adrian Lewis 99.02	8

Semi-finals (best of 19 legs); 31 August
1	(England) Phil Taylor 109.42	10
4	(Australia) Simon Whitlock 96.61	6
2	(Netherlands) Michael van Gerwen 99.90	10
3	(England) Adrian Lewis 95.02	7

Final (best of 19 legs); 31 August
1	(England) Phil Taylor 109.46	10
2	(Netherlands) Michael van Gerwen 101.40	3

== Broadcasting ==
This event was shown live in the United Kingdom and Europe by Eurosport.
