= 2014 Singapore Darts Masters =

Tournament information
- Dates: 15–16 August 2014
- Venue: Singapore Indoor Stadium
- Location: Singapore
- Country: Singapore
- Organisation(s): PDC
- Format: Legs
- Prize fund: £125,000
- Winner's share: £30,000
- High checkout: 170 Michael van Gerwen

Champion(s)
- (Netherlands) Michael van Gerwen

The 2014 Singapore Darts Masters was the inaugural staging of the tournament by the Professional Darts Corporation, as a second entry in the 2014 World Series of Darts. The tournament took place at the Singapore Indoor Stadium, Singapore on 15–16 August 2014. The tournament featured eight players, of which two players were wildcard choices.

Michael van Gerwen won the title by defeating Simon Whitlock 11–8 in the final.

== Prize money ==
The total prize fund for the event for £125,000.

Position (no. of players)		Prize money (Total: £125,000)
Winner	(1)	£30,000
Runner-up	(1)	£25,000
Semi-finalists	(2)	£15,000
Quarter-finalists	(4)	£10,000

== Qualifiers ==
The top six in the Order of Merit as of June 2014 qualified for the event, with the top 4 seeded, with the exception of Adrian Lewis, who rejected the invitation. The top six included:

1. (Netherlands) Michael van Gerwen (winner)
2. (England) Phil Taylor (quarter-finals)
3. ~~(England) Adrian Lewis (withdrew)~~ (Australia) Simon Whitlock (runner-up)
4. (Scotland) Peter Wright (quarter-finals)
5. (England) Dave Chisnall (semi-finals)
6. (England) James Wade (semi-finals)

Wildcards:

- (Netherlands) Raymond van Barneveld (quarter-finals)
- (England) Andy Hamilton (quarter-finals)

== Draw ==
Schedule of play:

Quarter-finals (best of 19 legs); 15 August
1	(Netherlands) Michael van Gerwen 98.04	10
(England) Andy Hamilton 87.54	4
4	(Scotland) Peter Wright 96.13	4
(England) James Wade 100.65	10
2	(England) Phil Taylor 101.47	6
(England) Dave Chisnall 95.00	10
3	(Australia) Simon Whitlock 97.05	10
(Netherlands) Raymond van Barneveld 95.51	6

Semi-finals (best of 21 legs); 16 August
1	(Netherlands) Michael van Gerwen 100.54	11
(England) James Wade 104.94	9
(England) Dave Chisnall 94.26	6
3	(Australia) Simon Whitlock 94.67	11

Final (best of 21 legs); 16 August
1	(Netherlands) Michael van Gerwen 100.33	11
3	(Australia) Simon Whitlock 95.56	8

== Broadcasting ==
The Singapore Darts Masters was broadcast live on Sky Sports in the United Kingdom and Ireland, on RTL 7 in the Netherlands, on Fox Sports in Australia and on Sky New Zealand.
