= 2014 Perth Darts Masters =

Tournament information
- Dates: 22–24 August 2014
- Venue: HBF Stadium
- Location: Perth
- Country: Australia
- Organisation(s): PDC
- Format: Legs
- Prize fund: £73,000
- Winner's share: £20,000

Champion(s)
- (England) Phil Taylor

The 2014 Perth Darts Masters was the inaugural staging of a tournament by the Professional Darts Corporation, as a third entry in the 2014 World Series of Darts. The tournament featured 16 players and was held at the HBF Stadium in Perth, Western Australia from 22–24 August 2014.

Phil Taylor won the title by defeating Michael van Gerwen 11–9 in the final.

== Prize money ==
The total prize fund was £73,000.

Position (no. of players)		Prize money (Total: £73,000)
Winner	(1)	£20,000
Runner-up	(1)	£10,000
Semi-finalists	(2)	£7,500
Quarter-finalists	(4)	£5,000
First round	(8)	£1,000

== Qualifiers ==
The eight seeded PDC players were:

1. (Netherlands) Michael van Gerwen (runner-up)
2. (England) Phil Taylor (winner)
3. ~~(England) Adrian Lewis (withdrew)~~ (Australia) Simon Whitlock (quarter-finals)
4. (Scotland) Peter Wright (quarter-finals)
5. (England) Dave Chisnall (semi-finals)
6. (England) James Wade (semi-finals)
7. (Netherlands) Raymond van Barneveld (quarter-finals)
8. (Australia) Paul Nicholson (quarter-finals)

Adrian Lewis decided not to compete in the event and was replaced by Paul Nicholson, who was originally a wildcard selection. An additional place was therefore on offer to the leading non-qualified player from the DPA Australian Grand Prix Order of Merit on August 18.

The Oceanic qualifiers were:

- (Australia) Kyle Anderson (first round)
- (Australia) Beau Anderson (first round)
- (New Zealand) Warren Parry (first round)
- (Australia) Laurence Ryder (first round)
- (Australia) Vinay Cooper (first round)
- (Australia) Justin Miles (first round)
- (Australia) Shane Tichowitsch (first round)
- (Australia) David Platt (first round)

== Draw ==
First round (best of 11 legs); 22 August
1	(Netherlands) Michael van Gerwen 95.94	6
(Australia) Kyle Anderson 85.00	0
8	(Australia) Paul Nicholson 98.61	6
(Australia) Shane Tichowitsch 92.44	2
5	(England) James Wade 88.84	6
(Australia) Beau Anderson 79.02	2
4	(Scotland) Peter Wright 97.08	6
(New Zealand) Warren Parry 84.35	1
2	(England) Phil Taylor 96.72	6
(Australia) David Platt 91.91	4
7	(Netherlands) Raymond van Barneveld 88.33	6
(Australia) Laurence Ryder 76.73	2
6	(England) Dave Chisnall 102.48	6
(Australia) Justin Miles 86.68	0
3	(Australia) Simon Whitlock 102.50	6
(Australia) Vinay Cooper 83.93	3

Quarter-finals (best of 15 legs); 23 August
1	(Netherlands) Michael van Gerwen 118.21	8
8	(Australia) Paul Nicholson 101.88	3
5	(England) James Wade 93.83	8
4	(Scotland) Peter Wright 87.86	7
2	(England) Phil Taylor 109.86	8
7	(Netherlands) Raymond van Barneveld 93.42	4
6	(England) Dave Chisnall 100.01	8
3	(Australia) Simon Whitlock 101.84	6

Semi-finals (best of 19 legs); 24 August
1	(Netherlands) Michael van Gerwen 101.82	10
5	(England) James Wade 100.71	6
2	(England) Phil Taylor 106.55	10
6	(England) Dave Chisnall 93.11	4

Final (best of 21 legs); 24 August
1	(Netherlands) Michael van Gerwen 103.02	9
2	(England) Phil Taylor 105.08	11
