= 2013 Dubai Duty Free Darts Masters =

Tournament information
- Dates: 23–24 May 2013
- Venue: Dubai Tennis Centre
- Location: Dubai
- Country: United Arab Emirates
- Organisation(s): PDC
- Format: Legs; Final – best of 21
- Prize fund: $245,000
- Winner's share: $65,000
- High checkout: 170 Michael van Gerwen

Champion(s)
- (Netherlands) Michael van Gerwen

The 2013 Dubai Duty Free Darts Masters was the inaugural staging of the tournament by the Professional Darts Corporation, as a first entry in the new World Series of Darts. The tournament featured the top 8 players according to the Order of Merit, competing in a knockout system. The tournament was held at the Dubai Tennis Centre in Dubai over 23–24 May 2013.

Michael van Gerwen won the title, defeating fellow Dutchman Raymond van Barneveld 11–7 in the final.

== Qualifiers ==
The top eight on the PDC Order of Merit after the 2013 World Championship qualified for the event, with the top 4 seeded. These were:

1. (England) Phil Taylor (quarter-finals)
2. (England) Adrian Lewis (quarter-finals)
3. (England) James Wade (semi-finals)
4. (Netherlands) Michael van Gerwen (winner)
5. (Australia) Simon Whitlock (quarter-finals)
6. (England) Andy Hamilton (semi-finals)
7. (England) Wes Newton (quarter-finals)
8. (Netherlands) Raymond van Barneveld (runner-up)

== Prize money ==
The total prize fund was $245,000.

Position (no. of players)		Prize money (Total: $245,000)
Winner	(1)	$65,000
Runner-up	(1)	$40,000
Semi-finalists	(2)	$30,000
Quarter-finalists	(4)	$20,000

== Draw ==
Quarter-finals (best of 19 legs); 23 May
1	(England) Phil Taylor 93.96	8
(England) Andy Hamilton 91.40	10
4	(Netherlands) Michael van Gerwen 96.56	10
(England) Wes Newton 94.97	7
2	(England) Adrian Lewis 87.66	6
(Netherlands) Raymond van Barneveld 86.62	10
3	(England) James Wade 89.64	10
(Australia) Simon Whitlock 88.11	8

Semi-finals (best of 21 legs); 24 May
(England) Andy Hamilton 97.42	9
4	(Netherlands) Michael van Gerwen 97.06	11
(Netherlands) Raymond van Barneveld 90.75	11
3	(England) James Wade 86.09	5

Final (best of 21 legs); 24 May
4	(Netherlands) Michael van Gerwen 104.21	11
(Netherlands) Raymond van Barneveld 99.23	7

== Broadcasting ==
This event was shown live in the United Kingdom and Europe by Eurosport.
