= Michael van Gerwen =

Dutch darts player (born 1989)

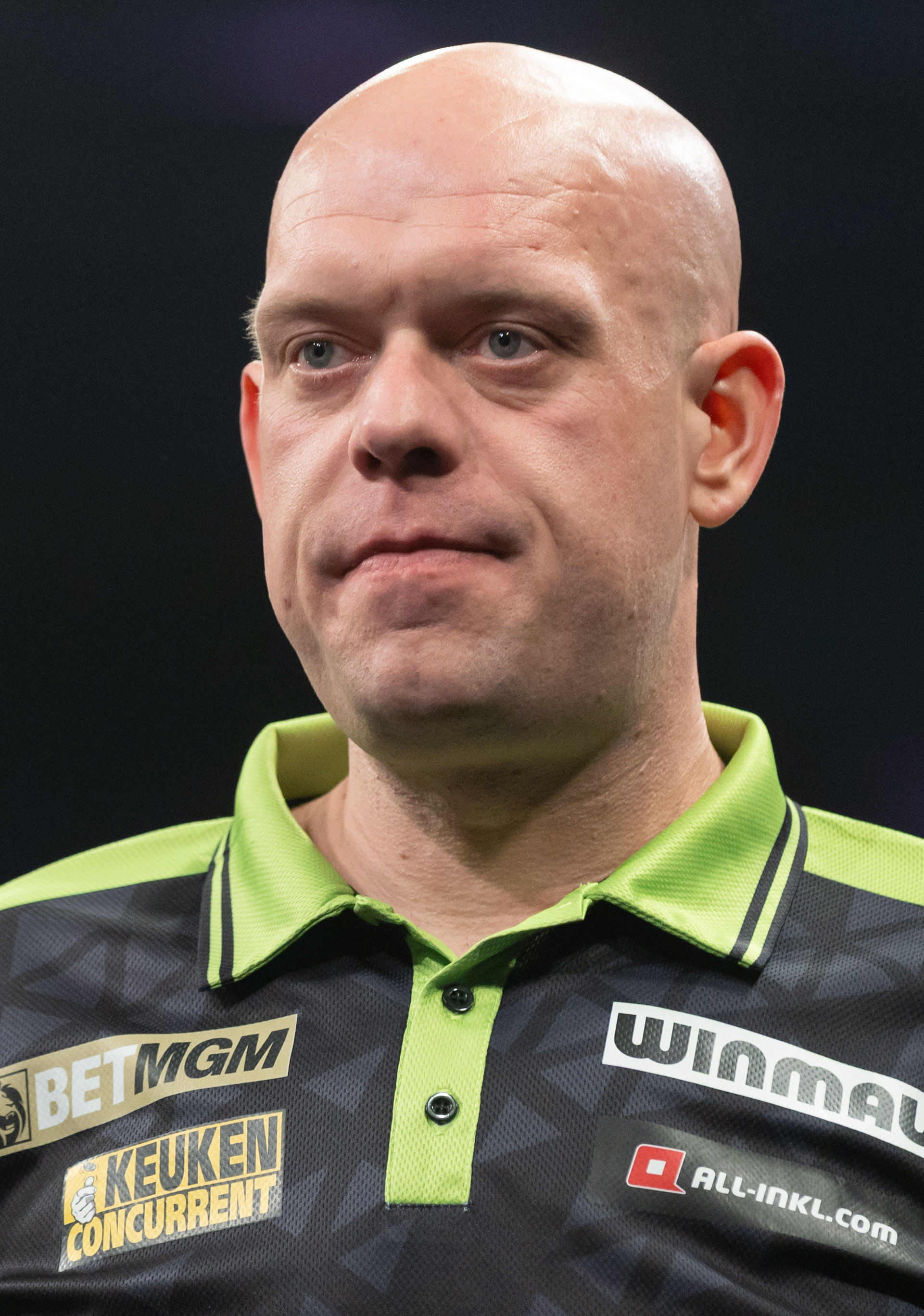
- Van Gerwen in 2026

Personal information
- Nicknames: Mighty Mike, MVG, The Green Machine
- Born: 25 April 1989 (age 37) Boxtel, Netherlands
- Home town: Vlijmen, Netherlands

Sport
- Sport: Darts
- Playing since: 2002
- Darts: 21.5g Winmau Signature
- Laterality: Right-handed
- Walk-on music: "Seven Nation Army" by The White Stripes

Organisation (see split in darts)
- BDO: 2005–2007
- PDC: 2007–present (Tour Card: 2011–present)
- Current world ranking: (PDC) 8 ▲3 (22 November 2026)

WDF major events – best performances
- World Championship: Last 32: 2007
- World Masters: Winner (1): 2006
- World Trophy: Semi-final: 2006
- Int. Darts League: Quarter-final: 2006

PDC premier events – best performances
- World Championship: Winner (3): 2014, 2017, 2019
- World Matchplay: Winner (3): 2015, 2016, 2022
- World Grand Prix: Winner (6): 2012, 2014, 2016, 2018, 2019, 2022
- UK Open: Winner (3): 2015, 2016, 2020
- Grand Slam: Winner (3): 2015, 2016, 2017
- European Championship: Winner (4): 2014, 2015, 2016, 2017
- Premier League: Winner (7): 2013, 2016, 2017, 2018, 2019, 2022, 2023
- PC Finals: Winner (7): 2013, 2015, 2016, 2017, 2019, 2020, 2022
- Masters: Winner (5): 2015, 2016, 2017, 2018, 2019
- Champions League: Winner (1): 2019
- World Series Finals: Winner (6): 2015, 2016, 2017, 2019, 2023, 2025

Other tournament wins
- Years
PDC World Cup of Darts (team event)	2014, 2017, 2018
See Titles

Other achievements
2011	PDC Young Player of the Year
2013	PDC Young Player of the Year
2013	PDC Fans' Player of the Year
2013	PDPA Players' Player of the Year
2016	Best ProTour Player
2016	PDPA Players' Player of the Year
2016	PDC Player of the Year (with Gary Anderson)
2018	Appointed Knight of the Order of Orange-Nassau

Michael van Gerwen (Note: Dutch pronunciation: [ˈmɑikəl vɑŋ ˈɣɛrʋə(n)]) (born 25 April 1989) is a Dutch professional darts player who competes in Professional Darts Corporation (PDC) events, where he is ranked world number eight; he was ranked world number one from 2014 to 2021. Widely regarded as one of the greatest players in the history of the sport, van Gerwen is a three-time PDC world champion, having won the title in 2014, 2017 and 2019, and has won 48 PDC major singles titles, placing him second in the all-time list behind Phil Taylor.

Van Gerwen began playing darts at the age of 13. At age 17, he won the 2006 World Masters and threw a televised nine-dart finish at the 2007 Masters of Darts. However, after this initial burst onto the darting scene, Van Gerwen struggled for consistent form, losing the final of the PDC World Youth Championship in both 2011, and 2012, his breakthrough year. Improving from world number 38 at the start of 2012 to number four at the beginning of 2013, he won his first PDC major title at the World Grand Prix and reached the final at the 2013 World Championship. In 2014, at age 24, Van Gerwen became the then-youngest winner of the PDC World Championship.

Van Gerwen's 48 titles include a record seven Premier League titles, three World Matchplay titles, and six World Grand Prix titles. He is also a three-time PDC World Cup of Darts champion, partnering Raymond van Barneveld for the Netherlands. Van Gerwen has reached seven PDC World Championship finals and is one of only five players to win the title more than once. He holds the record for the highest three-dart average in a televised darts match, hitting a 123.4 average against Michael Smith in the 2016 Premier League. As of June 2026, he has won the most PDC Pro Tour events, with 91, and has won a total of 160 PDC titles in his professional career.

== Early life ==
Michael van Gerwen was born on 25 April 1989 in Boxtel in the Netherlands. He played football as a defender until he was 12 and began playing darts regularly at 13. He reached the final of the Primus Masters Youth event at the age of 14 in 2003. He then started to amass youth titles in 2006. He also won the Men's events in the Norway and Northern Ireland Opens in the same year that he took the youth titles. Before he became a professional darts player, he worked as a tiler.

== BDO career ==
Van Gerwen picked up several Open titles and rose up the BDO/WDF World Rankings having climbed to third before his 18th birthday. He reached the semi-finals of the Bavaria World Darts Trophy in 2006. Despite losing to Martin Adams, the Dutch youngster came within one dart of the perfect nine-dart finish, just missing double twelve. He did manage the highest possible checkout of 170 during the tournament.

He managed to eclipse that performance at the 2006 Winmau World Masters by becoming the youngest ever champion. Having trailed 1–4 and 2–5 to Adams, he came back to win the title and took Eric Bristow's record as the youngest ever winner at the age of 17 years and 174 days.

His early career success led to speculation that he would join the other professional circuit of darts, the Professional Darts Corporation. However, during the 2006 World Darts Trophy, Van Gerwen held a press conference to make it clear that he wanted to stay with the BDO/WDF. He also finished top of the DDF (Dutch Darts Federation) Rankings, which would have secured him a place at the PDC World Championship, if he chose to accept. He had already committed to playing at Lakeside, so the place went to Rico Vonck, who finished second in the rankings.

Van Gerwen was the bookmakers' pre-tournament favourite to win the 2007 Lakeside World title, but his hopes were ended in the first round by Gary Robson. On the night of the 2007 BDO World Championship final, it was announced on Dutch television that Van Gerwen, along with Jelle Klaasen and Vincent van der Voort, would be switching to the Professional Darts Corporation.

== PDC career ==
=== 2007–2011 ===
Although he was a BDO player he was eligible for certain PDC events in his home country, even before he switched to the PDC. This included the Open Holland in 2006, in which he took the title. He made his PDC debut on 20 January 2007 at the non-televised Players Championships in Gibraltar and beat Andy Hamilton before losing in the last 16 to Roland Scholten. In the second Players Championship the following day, he beat Raymond van Barneveld in the early rounds only to lose to Alan Warriner-Little in the quarter-finals. He followed this by beating 13-time World Champion Phil Taylor 3–0 in sets on the opening night of the Masters of Darts tournament. He went on to reach the semi-final of the tournament and achieved a nine-dart finish against Van Barneveld, but lost the match.

His televised PDC debut came at the 2007 UK Open, where he lost in the last 32 to Colin Osborne. At his first PDC World Championship, he played Phil Taylor in the first round of the 2008 tournament; notably, he had one match dart to knock Taylor out.

Van Gerwen ended his long wait for a tournament victory by beating Vincent van der Voort 6–3 in the final of the Players Championship in Taunton on 11 April 2009. Van Gerwen was defeated 6–4 by Arron Monk in the final of the inaugural PDC Under-21 World Championship.

=== 2012: First PDC major title ===
In the 2012 World Championship, Van Gerwen made it to the last 16 for the first time by beating Colin Osborne and Mervyn King. However he lost to Simon Whitlock 4–3.

Van Gerwen was named Young Player of the Year at the PDC annual awards ceremony on 3 January 2012, for winning four PDC Unicorn Youth Tour events during 2011 and his World Championship run.

In 2012, he won the second UK Open qualifier of the season, defeating Dave Chisnall in the final 6–1. In the UK Open itself he lost in the last 16 to Terry Jenkins. Van Gerwen topped the PDC Youth Tour Order of Merit going into the 2012 PDC World Youth Championship, but went on to lose in the final for a second consecutive year, this time against James Hubbard. Van Gerwen won the eighth Players Championship event in June after beating Simon Whitlock 6–1 in the final. At the World Matchplay, he won 5 legs in a row to record a 10–6 victory over Simon Whitlock in the first round, and then faced a last 16 encounter with Steve Beaton, which he won 13–9 while throwing the fourth nine-dart finish in the tournament's history in the tenth leg. Van Gerwen was 5–11 down in his quarter-final against James Wade, but produced a fightback to only trail 11–12 and then missed one dart to level the game. He went on to lose 13–16.

Van Gerwen's third title of the year came at the 11th Players Championship, where he defeated Ian White 6–1 in the final with a 107.85 average. Van Gerwen was involved in an exceptional match in the last 16 of the European Championship as he was defeated by compatriot Raymond van Barneveld 9–10, despite averaging 104. Another Players Championship success followed with a 6–5 victory over Robert Thornton.

In October 2012, Van Gerwen won his first PDC major title at the World Grand Prix. He came from behind to knock out Colin Lloyd 2–1 in the first round, and then beat an out of sorts Adrian Lewis 3–1 in the second. In the quarter-final against Andy Hamilton, he missed four darts to win 3–1, only for Hamilton to take out a 160 finish to force a decider. Van Gerwen maintained his composure and took the final set 3–2 and then heavily out-scored Wes Newton in the semi-finals in a 5–1 win. He played Mervyn King in the final, defeating him 6–4, after being 0–3 and 1–4 down. Van Gerwen afterwards described the win as the best day in his life and in claiming the £100,000 prize he rose to world number eight, overtaking Van Barneveld as the highest placed Dutchman. He did not have to wait long for his sixth title of the year, as he won the following week's Players Championship averaging 113 against Jamie Caven in the semi-finals, before beating Nick Fullwell 6–3 in the final.

In a Championship League game, van Gerwen averaged 121.86 in defeating Steve Beaton 6–0. He won six of his seven league matches to finish top of the table, but then lost 5–6 to the same opponent in the semi-finals. He soon returned to winning ways by taking another Players Championship title, coming back from 0–4 in the final against Ian White to triumph 6–5.

Van Gerwen won all three of his group games at the Grand Slam of Darts to top Group B and face Phil Taylor in the last 16, in a match billed as a clash between the current best two players in the world. There, Van Gerwen ended a five-year, 15-game losing streak against Taylor to defeat him 10–5 with a 108.38 average in a performance he described as the best of his career. He played Scott Waites in the quarter-finals, who himself had already beaten Taylor in the tournament, and produced another superb display as he hit two 170 finishes and an average of 106.63 in a 16–12 win. He averaged over 100 once more to defeat Dean Winstanley 16–8 in the semi-finals, to set up a clash in the final against compatriot and five-time world champion Raymond van Barneveld. Van Gerwen was never ahead in the final and couldn't quite match the heavy scoring and clinical finishing he had produced earlier in the tournament as he was beaten 14–16.

His eighth tournament win of 2012 came at the 20th and final Players Championship, where he beat Taylor for the first time in a final and also beat reigning world champion Adrian Lewis in the semi-finals. He was 4–5 down to Taylor, but produced back-to-back finishes of 164 and 124 to win and in doing so finished third on the ProTour Order of Merit to qualify for the Finals. Van Gerwen went out of the Finals in the second round 10–8 to Andy Hamilton.

=== 2013: First world final, Premier League champion ===
After his exceptional year in 2012, Van Gerwen entered the 2013 World Championship as the second favourite behind Phil Taylor. In his semi-final match against James Wade, Van Gerwen hit a nine-dart finish. He almost repeated the feat in the very next leg, after hitting eight perfect darts before missing one dart at double 12 that would have made him the first player ever to hit back-to-back perfect legs. However, he lost the set but won the match 6–4. In his first World Championship final, he played Phil Taylor and led 2–0 and 4–2, but lost 7–4. Van Gerwen's run in the tournament saw him climb to number four on the Order of Merit, which guaranteed his place in the Premier League for the first time.

At the PDC awards dinner in January 2013, Van Gerwen won three awards; Young Player of the Year, PDPA Player of the Year and Fans' Player of the Year. In his first World Cup of Darts, he partnered Van Barneveld and the Dutch pair suffered a shock in the last 16 when they were beaten 3–5 by the Finnish duo of Jani Haavisto and Jarkko Komula. Van Gerwen won his first tournament of 2013 at the first UK Open Qualifier of the year with a 6–2 victory over Dave Chisnall in the final. He completed a weekend double a day later by defeating Brendan Dolan also by a 6–2 scoreline in the second Qualifier. The win saw Van Gerwen replace Wade as the world number three. His run continued by taking the third event with a 6–2 win against Michael Smith. Van Gerwen's first defeat on the 2013 Pro Tour came a day later when Robert Thornton beat him 4–6 in the semi-finals of the fourth Qualifier. His unbeaten run ended at 29 matches. Despite losing in the semi-finals of the European Darts Trophy to Paul Nicholson in April, Van Gerwen replaced Adrian Lewis as the world number two. Van Gerwen won the sixth qualifier with a 6–5 defeat of Kim Huybrechts in the final. He also won the final event with a 6–0 win against Mervyn King in the final, meaning he had won five of the eight Qualifiers. His sixth title of the year came a week later at the second Players Championship by beating Stuart Kellett 6–1 in the final.

In the 2013 Premier League, Van Gerwen became the first player other than Phil Taylor to finish top of the league after Taylor had done it in all eight previous stagings of the event. He won 11, drew two and lost three of his 16 games, averaging over 100 in nine of them. He beat James Wade 8–4 in the semi-finals to face Taylor in the final. Van Gerwen was 2–5 down but then won five unanswered legs before Taylor stopped the rot by taking out a finish of 65. In the next leg, Van Gerwen declined a dart at the bull when on a finish of 87 to set up 32, but Taylor stepped in to finish 160 to level the match at 7–7. However, Van Gerwen began the 15th leg with a 180 and won two consecutive legs to move within one game of the title. He missed two darts at double eight to win 10–7, but with Taylor leaving 40 after 12 darts in the next, Van Gerwen finished 132 on the bull to become only the fourth player to win the Premier League.

Van Gerwen's form continued as he won the European Darts Open in Düsseldorf, Germany, saving his best performance for the final where he beat Simon Whitlock 6–2 with an average of 106.68. Another title followed less than a week later as he won the non-ranking Dubai Darts Masters, taking out finishes of 170 and 164 during an 11–7 triumph over Raymond van Barneveld in the final. His 10th tournament win came in June at the Austrian Darts Open by beating Mervyn King 6–3 in the final. It was Van Gerwen's fifth title in a row and extended his unbeaten run to 24 matches. He was the number one seed for the UK Open having earned £35,600 in the eight qualifying events, just over £25,000 ahead of Robert Thornton in second place. Van Gerwen stretched his unbeaten streak to 27 games before he met Taylor in the quarter-finals. Van Gerwen did not quite produce his best game as he was beaten 7–10. Two weeks later he won the sixth Players Championship by defeating Andy Hamilton 6–1 in the final. At the Gibraltar Darts Trophy his unbeaten run of 15 matches in European Tour events was ended as he lost to Adrian Lewis 5–6 in the quarter-finals.

At the European Championship, Van Gerwen beat Mervyn King and Jelle Klaasen both with 104 averages, but was defeated 8–11 by Lewis in the semi-finals. Lewis was also the victor when the two met at the same stage of the World Matchplay, beating Van Gerwen 17–15. Van Gerwen overcame Lewis in the semi-finals of the Sydney Darts Masters 10–7, but was then defeated 10–3 in the final by Taylor. In the defence of his World Grand Prix title, Van Gerwen swept past John Part 2–0 and Van Barneveld 3–0 in 21 minutes to play Dave Chisnall in the quarter-finals. Van Gerwen came from 2–0 down to level the match but Chisnall halted his momentum by winning the final set by three legs to one. He qualified from Group 5 of the Championship League having lost in the final of two previous groups, one of which included a nine-dart finish in a 6–5 loss to Terry Jenkins in Group 4.

In the Winners Group, Van Gerwen was the only player to beat Taylor and he finished second in the table by winning five of his seven games. In the semi-finals, he saw off Richie Burnett 6–2 to face Taylor in the final. Van Gerwen fell 5–0 down before winning three successive legs but had left himself too much to do and lost 6–3. He finished the year as the top seed for the Players Championship Finals having amassed £125,350 during the year in ProTour events, over £50,000 ahead of Chisnall in second place. He produced two superb comebacks in the event, the first coming in the second round when he took six legs in a row to see off Lewis 9–6. He produced the second in the final as from 6–3 down he hit a seven leg burst against Taylor and secured his second major title of the year with an 11–7 victory.

=== 2014: World Champion and World No.1 ===
In the 2014 World Championship, Van Gerwen began with victories over qualifier Zoran Lerchbacher and Kevin McDine. He trailed Gary Anderson 3–1 in the third round, but came back to win 4–3. He then faced former BDO World Champion Mark Webster, whom he beat 5–3. Van Gerwen beat Adrian Lewis 6–0 to reach the final. In his second successive World Championship final, he faced Peter Wright and won 7–4. He became the sixth different winner of the event and, at the age of 24, the then-youngest as well as jumping above Phil Taylor to become the new world number one. Later in the month, he won the ProTour Player of the Year, Fans' Player of the Year and PDC Player of the Year at the Annual Awards.

On the opening night of the Premier League, Van Gerwen registered the first ever whitewash over Taylor in the tournament's history, 7–0 in 13 minutes with an average of 109.59. He enjoyed a title success in his home country at the Dutch Darts Masters by beating Mervyn King in a high quality final where both players averaged over 107. A week later, he won the final UK Open Qualifier with a 6–0 whitewash over Michael Smith. At the UK Open, he was beaten 10–8 in the semi-finals by Terry Jenkins. Van Gerwen won his 20th title on the PDC tour by claiming the second Players Championship with a 6–1 victory over Dean Winstanley. In April, Taylor won their reverse fixture in the Premier League 7–4 and was also the victor when the two met in the final of the German Darts Masters. He finished top of the Premier League table for the second year in a row, winning 11 of his 16 games, and then edged past Gary Anderson 8–7 in the semi-finals. From 5–5 in the final, Raymond van Barneveld took four successive legs and ended Van Gerwen's Premier League reign with a 10–6 win. He defended his Dubai Duty Free Darts Masters title by seeing off Wright 11–7.

At the World Cup of Darts, Van Gerwen and Van Barneveld produced a 117.88 average in their doubles decider against Northern Ireland to whitewash them 4–0 and meet England's Taylor and Lewis in the final. Van Gerwen defeated Taylor 4–0 and Van Barneveld recorded the same scoreline against Lewis. He went into his singles match versus Lewis knowing a win would earn the Dutch pair the title and he did so with a 4–2 success.

Van Gerwen played in his first World Matchplay final but was beaten 18–9. He returned to claim the inaugural Singapore Darts Masters with an 11–8 victory over Simon Whitlock. A week later he averaged an incredible 118.21 in beating Paul Nicholson 8–3 in the quarter-finals of the Perth Darts Masters and went on to reach the final where Taylor beat him 11–9. Van Gerwen also won the 14th Players Championship with a 6–4 victory over Michael Smith. A week later, they contested the final of the 2014 European Darts Trophy, with Van Gerwen losing 6–5.

His second major title of the year came at the World Grand Prix as he edged a close final against James Wade 5–3 in sets. Seven days later, he beat Wade once more this time 6–2 in the final of the 18th Players Championship. He averaged 111 in eliminating Dave Chisnall 10–5 in the quarter-finals of the European Championship and then threw his fourth career televised nine-darter during an 11–6 semi-final victory over Van Barneveld. Van Gerwen won the title with an 11–4 victory.

=== 2015: Triple Crown Champion ===
Van Gerwen reached the semi-finals of the 2015 World Championship, by beating Robert Thornton in the quarters. He played Gary Anderson and lost 6–3. Van Gerwen won the Masters by beating Van Barneveld 11–6 in the final. Van Gerwen won the second UK Open Qualifier by beating Vincent van der Voort 6–3 in the final. Van Gerwen also took the third event with a 6–1 triumph over James Wade. He then won the 2015 German Darts Championship by defeating Anderson 6–2 in the final. He defeated Jelle Klaasen in the final of the fourth UK Open Qualifier 6–5.

In the 2015 UK Open, he won the UK Open title with an 11–5 victory over Peter Wright in the final. He won his second European Tour event in a row at the Gibraltar Darts Trophy with a 6–3 success over Terry Jenkins and made it a trio of titles by seeing off John Henderson 6–5 at the German Darts Masters, which saw him become the second player ever to reach £1 million in prize money on the PDC Order of Merit, after Phil Taylor. Van Gerwen continued to dominate the PDC circuit by claiming the fourth and sixth Players Championship events with 6–1 and 6–5 wins over Lewis and Wade respectively. A 6–6 draw with Dave Chisnall ensured he would finish top of the Premier League for the third year in a row. Van Gerwen beat Van Barneveld 10–8 to win the final but lost to Anderson 11–7 in the final. Van Gerwen maintained his unbeaten record in the Dubai Darts Masters as he took his third title in a row by defeating Taylor 11–8 in the final. He stretched his unbeaten run to 20 matches in European Tour events as he claimed the Dutch Darts Masters by whitewashing Justin Pipe 6–0. Van Gerwen and Van Barneveld were knocked out in the semi-finals of the World Cup in a doubles match against Scotland's Anderson and Wright.

Van Gerwen won his first World Matchplay title by beating James Wade 18–12. The victory saw him overtake Wade as the PDC's second most successful player with nine major tournament wins, but still a long way behind Taylor who leads with 79. Michael Smith defeated Van Gerwen 6–2 in the final of the European Darts Trophy, but he took the European Darts Matchplay seven days later with a 6–4 success over Chisnall in the final. Van Gerwen hit 18 180s in the final of the World Grand Prix against Robert Thornton, but ultimately missed too many doubles to be edged out 5–4 in sets. He looked set to lose a second successive major final when he trailed Gary Anderson 10–7 at the European Championship, but won the next four legs without allowing the Scot a dart for the match to win 11–10. It marked the first time Van Gerwen had retained a major title.

Van Gerwen won the Grand Slam, with a 16–13 win over Phil Taylor in the final. The title completed Van Gerwen's set of winning all of the PDC's current majors during his career. In the final of the World Series of Darts Finals, Van Gerwen came from 10–9 down to defeat Wright 11–10 with a 129 checkout and an 11-dart leg. He took his fourth televised title in a row at the Players Championship Finals with an 11–6 win over Adrian Lewis. It also ensured he had featured in every televised final since the World Championship at the start of the year.

=== 2016 ===
Van Gerwen was defeated by Raymond van Barneveld in the third round of the 2016 World Championship in a shock result.

However he retained his Masters title by defeating Dave Chisnall 11–6 in the final. In week four of the Premier League, Van Gerwen broke the televised average record with 123.40 in a 7–1 win over Michael Smith. In the following round of fixtures, he averaged 116.67 in beating Peter Wright 7–2. A 7–5 win over Taylor saw Van Gerwen top the final Premier League table for the fourth year in a row. He won his second Premier League title (his first being in 2013) with an 11–3 victory over Taylor in what was Van Gerwen's fourth consecutive Premier League final. Taylor had led 2–1 but Van Gerwen soon took control of proceedings and won ten of the following eleven legs to complete a resounding win.

Van Gerwen had won three of the six UK Open Qualifiers and in the fourth round of the main event he produced his fifth televised nine-dart finish while defeating Rob Cross 9–5. He also hit 170 finishes in the leg before and after the perfect leg. He recovered from 4–1 down to Taylor in the semi-finals to win 10–6 and, in a repeat of last year's final, bested Wright 11–4 to retain his title. Van Gerwen won his second consecutive World Matchplay title with an 18–10 win over Taylor. He set a record average in a World Grand Prix final of 100.29 as he claimed the title by beating Anderson 5–2.

Van Gerwen claimed six of the ten European Tour events, five Players Championships and two World Series tournaments, as well as taking the main event of each of these tours, the European Championship, the World Series of Darts (beat Peter Wright 11–9) and the Players Championship Finals (overcame Dave Chisnall 11–3). He also retained his Grand Slam crown by defeating James Wade 16–8 in the final. His domination of the PDC circuit saw him win a total of 25 titles and £1.5 million in 2016, with a match success rate of 91%.

Taking Van Gerwen's 2016 alone, his 9 major titles won that year would have (at the time) put him third on the all-time list for most major titles won, behind only himself and Phil Taylor.

=== 2017: Second world title ===
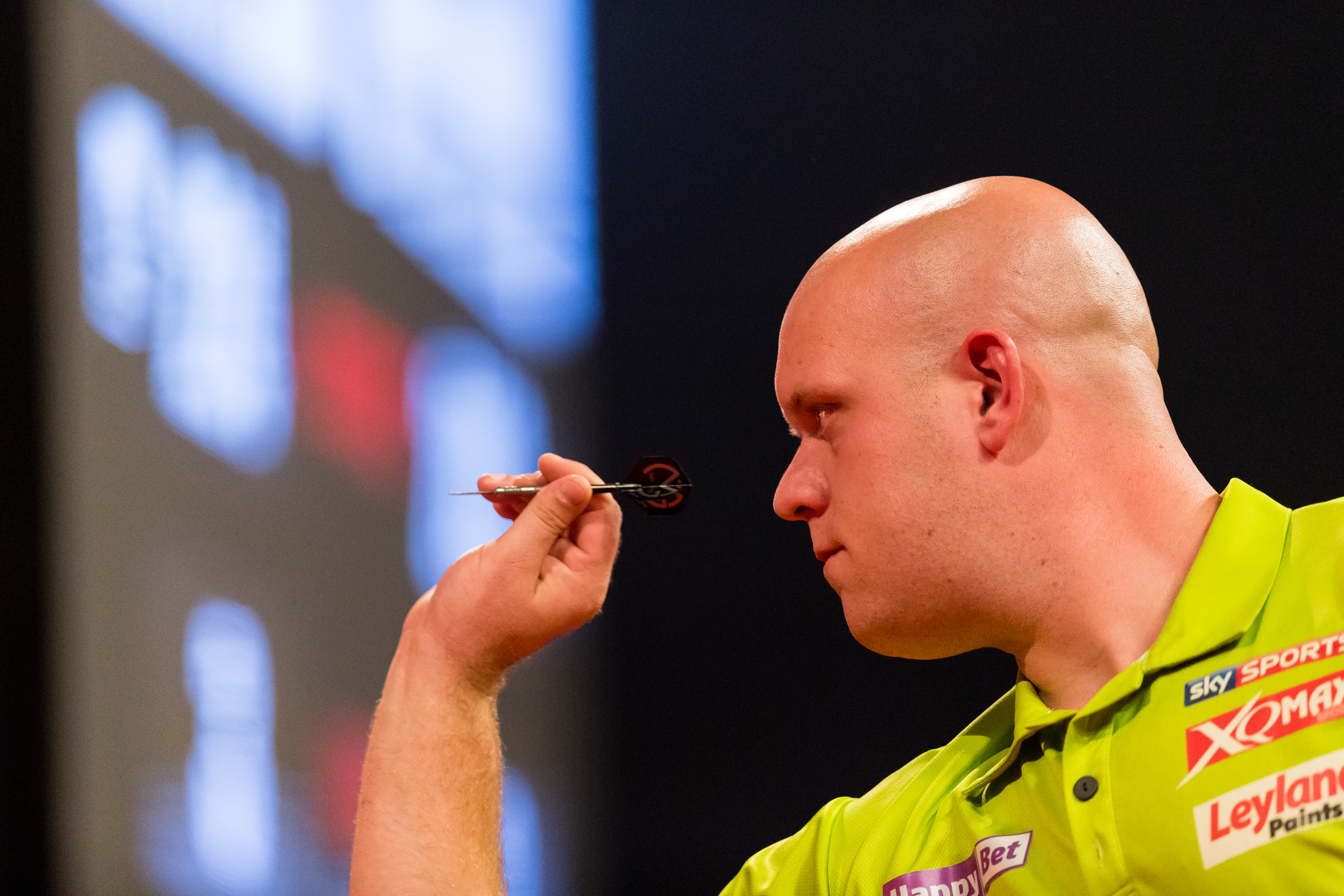
Van Gerwen at the 2017 German Darts Grand Prix

Van Gerwen averaged over 100 in each of his four matches as he advanced to the semi-finals of the 2017 World Championship. Raymond van Barneveld won the first set without reply in the semis, but Van Gerwen then produced the greatest ever World Championship performance as he averaged a tournament record 114.05 (32 legs) in a 6–2 win. It beat Phil Taylor's previous best of 111.21 (23 legs) in the second round of the 2002 World Championship. In the last set, Van Gerwen missed a dart at double 12 for a nine-darter. In the final, Gary Anderson left 28 to take a 3–1 lead, but Van Gerwen finished 86 to snipe that set, leveling the match at 2–2. Van Gerwen ultimately took 12 of the next 14 legs to establish a 6–2 lead. He got over the line to take his second World Championship crown with a 7–3 win. With this victory, he held all seven PDC major ranking titles at the same time. 42 180s were thrown in the final, the most ever in a darts match and Van Gerwen's average of 107.79 brought his average over the whole tournament to 106.32. The win cemented his number one ranking as he was over £1 million ahead of second placed Anderson.

Van Gerwen won his third successive Masters title by defeating Anderson 11–7 in the final. Van Gerwen threw two nine-darters during his third round 6–2 win over Ryan Murray at the fourth UK Open Qualifier and he would take the title by beating Anderson 6–3 in the decider. He could not defend his UK Open title because he was forced to withdraw from the event due to a back injury. In the 2017 edition of the Premier League, Van Gerwen successfully defended his title, topping the table of the league stage once again by winning nine matches, drawing four and losing two. After overcoming Anderson 10–7 in the semi-final, he would go on to face Peter Wright in the final. Van Gerwen beat Wright to claim his third Premier League title, with a tournament average of 104.76. At the World Cup, Netherlands secured their first title since 2014 by seeing off the Welsh pairing of Gerwyn Price and Mark Webster 3–1 in the final.

Following early exits in the Champions League and the World Grand Prix, Van Gerwen went back to winning ways by claiming his 4th European Championship title by defeating Rob Cross 11–7.

Van Gerwen's next tournament was the Grand Slam of Darts, winning all 3 of his group games to top Group A. He defeated Steve Lennon in the last 16 by a convincing 10–3 win. Van Gerwen followed this by defeating Rob Cross 16–13 in the quarter-finals, a 16–8 win over 6 time Grand Slam winner Phil Taylor in the semi-finals and a 16–12 win over Peter Wright in the final to claim his 3rd Grand Slam title.

=== 2018 ===
Van Gerwen reached the semi-final of the 2018 PDC World Championship but missed match darts and lost to debutant and eventual champion Rob Cross 6–5.

His next televised tournament was the Masters, where he took his fourth consecutive win at the tournament beating Raymond van Barneveld in the final after earlier wins over Gary Anderson, James Wade and Kim Huybrechts. At the first Pro Tour event of 2018, UK Open Qualifier 1, he beat Michael Smith in the final, averaging 105 for the tournament. He took his hundredth PDC singles title at the next UK Open Qualifier with a win over Darren Webster in the final, becoming the second player to do so after Phil Taylor. He lost at the quarter final stage of the third qualifier to Smith, putting his earnings from the qualifiers over £20,000. Despite sitting out the final three qualifiers, his performances at the first three events was enough for him to top the UK Open Order of Merit and enter at the third round of the tournament. Drawn against Jeffrey de Zwaan, he lost 8–10 with a 96 average. This was the first time since 2012 he exited before the quarter final stage at the tournament, and the first time he lost his first match of a televised tournament since the World Grand Prix the year prior.

He achieved a 6–2 victory over Chris Dobey in Players Championship 5.

At the first European Tour event of 2018, the European Darts Open, he took his 21st European Tour title with an 8–7 victory over Peter Wright. Van Gerwen and Wright would play each other again in the final of the 2018 German Darts Grand Prix, with Van Gerwen prevailing once again by a scoreline of 8–5. It was his 22nd European Tour title.

He won Players Championship 9 by beating Scott Taylor 6–4 in the final. Van Gerwen played in the 10th Players Championship where he was beaten 4–6 by Jonny Clayton in the quarter-finals.

Van Gerwen won the European Darts Grand Prix, his 23rd European Tour title and his 10th title of the year that included wins over Dave Chisnall in quarter-finals by a scoreline of 6–4, a 7–0 whitewash over Michael Smith in the semi-finals and an 8–3 victory over James Wade in the final. The following week, he won his 11th title of the year (his 24th European Tour title) by winning his 5th consecutive Dutch Darts Masters by beating Steve Lennon 8–5 in the final. Notably, in his semi-final match with Daryl Gurney, Van Gerwen trailed 2–6 as well as surviving 3 match darts but the Dutchman produced a comeback performance to knock out the Northern Irishman 7–6.

His 12th title of the year followed shortly after on 17 May in winning the Premier League by beating Rob Cross 10–6 in the semi-finals and a comprehensive 11–4 victory over Michael Smith in the final with an average of 112.37, the highest ever average in a Premier League final. It was his 3rd consecutive Premier League title and his 4th Premier League title overall.

His 13th title of the year would follow in the World Cup of Darts with partner Raymond van Barneveld. They successfully defended their title for The Netherlands with a 3–1 victory over Scottish pairing Peter Wright and Gary Anderson. The following weekend saw him win his 14th title of the year and his 25th European Tour title with a victory in the Gibraltar Darts Trophy by beating Adrian Lewis 8–3 in the final with an average of over 108.

Van Gerwen returned to the winning circle by claiming his first World Series of Darts title of 2018 by defeating compatriot Raymond van Barneveld 11–4 at the final of the Auckland Darts Masters final. It was Van Gerwen's 16th title of 2018.

Van Gerwen lifted the 2018 World Grand Prix title, the fourth time he had won that title, with a 5–2 win over Peter Wright. He failed to retain the European Championship, World Series Finals and Grand Slam titles in 2018, and lost the final of the 2018 Players Championship Finals to Daryl Gurney.

=== 2019: Third world title ===
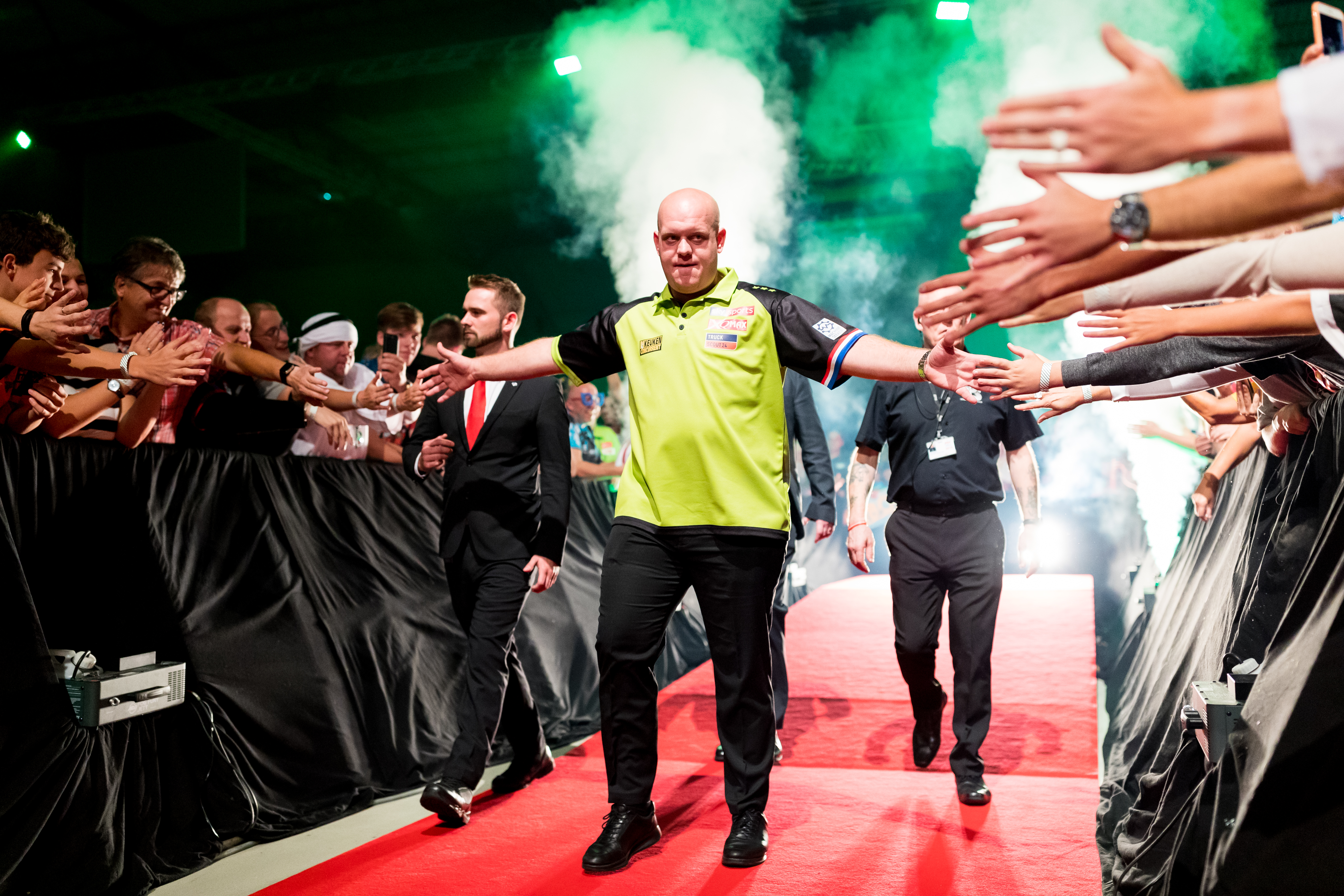
Van Gerwen during the 2019 European Darts Matchplay

Van Gerwen was top seed at the 2019 World Championship. He knocked Alan Tabern out in the second round despite having beer thrown at him during the walk on, before consecutive 4–1 victories over Max Hopp and former world champion Adrian Lewis. He beat Ryan Joyce 5–1 in the quarter-final to set up a semi-final with Gary Anderson. A dominant semi-final performance by the Dutchman saw him triumph 6–1 over Anderson, to reach the final against Michael Smith. He regained the world championship with a 7–3 win over Smith.

Van Gerwen kicked off the 2019 circuit with winning the 2019 Masters, defeating James Wade 11–5 in the final to secure his fifth consecutive Masters title. The next two weeks, Van Gerwen won Players Championship 1 and 3, henceforth breaking Phil Taylor's ProTour title record.

He retained his Premier League title yet again, beating Daryl Gurney 10–7 in the semi-finals, and beating Rob Cross 11–5 in the final.

Van Gerwen retained his World Grand Prix title with a win over Dave Chisnall, and won the Champions League of Darts for the first time, recovering from three legs down to beat Peter Wright 11–10. He regained his Players Championship Finals title, beating Gerwyn Price in the final, and hitting the only televised nine-dart finish of the year, in the second round against Adrian Lewis.

=== 2020 ===
Van Gerwen was again top seed at the 2020 World Championship. He easily reached the quarter-final, recovering from losing the first set to Jelle Klaasen in the second round to win, before consecutive 4–0 victories over Ricky Evans and former BDO World Champion Stephen Bunting. In the quarter-final, he triumphed over Darius Labanauskas, 5–2, to qualify for the semi-final for the seventh time in eight championships. There he beat Nathan Aspinall 6–3 to set up a final with Peter Wright. Van Gerwen was defeated in the final, 7–3.

At the 2020 Masters, Van Gerwen lost in the first round to Jonny Clayton, ending his run of five years as the tournament's champion, and a 20 match unbeaten run at the Marshall Arena. In March he won the UK Open for the third time, beating Gerwyn Price 11–9 in the final. In his run through to the final, he hit his seventh career televised nine-darter, against Daryl Gurney in the semi-finals. In November he won the Players Championship Finals for the 6th time, beating Mervyn King 11–10 in the final.

At the 2020 Premier League, Van Gerwen failed to make it to finals night for the very first time, following a string of poor results come night 13 and losing 8–2 in a crucial game to Daryl Gurney in the penultimate night of the tournament.

=== 2021: No longer the No.1 ===
Van Gerwen opened up his 2021 World Championship campaign with a 3–1 win over Ryan Murray, averaging 108.98 points in the match. In the last 16, he battled back from 1–3 down to defeat Joe Cullen 4–3 and reach the quarter-finals. In the quarter-finals, he was whitewashed 0–5 by Dave Chisnall. This loss resulted in Van Gerwen dropping to number 2 in the world rankings, following Gerwyn Price's World Championship victory.

Van Gerwen then went on to lose in consecutive TV tournaments, losing in the Masters to Jonny Clayton and in the semi-finals of the UK Open to Luke Humphries. Van Gerwen then proceeded to top the Premier League but consequently went on to lose to eventual winner Jonny Clayton in the semi-finals.

Van Gerwen reached the final of PC20 but was beaten by Peter Wright in the tournament decider. He later reached the final at PC29 and won after beating Nathan Aspinall 8–5.

Van Gerwen had another great run in the World Matchplay but was beaten in the semi-finals by eventual winner Peter Wright.

=== 2022: Resurgence ===
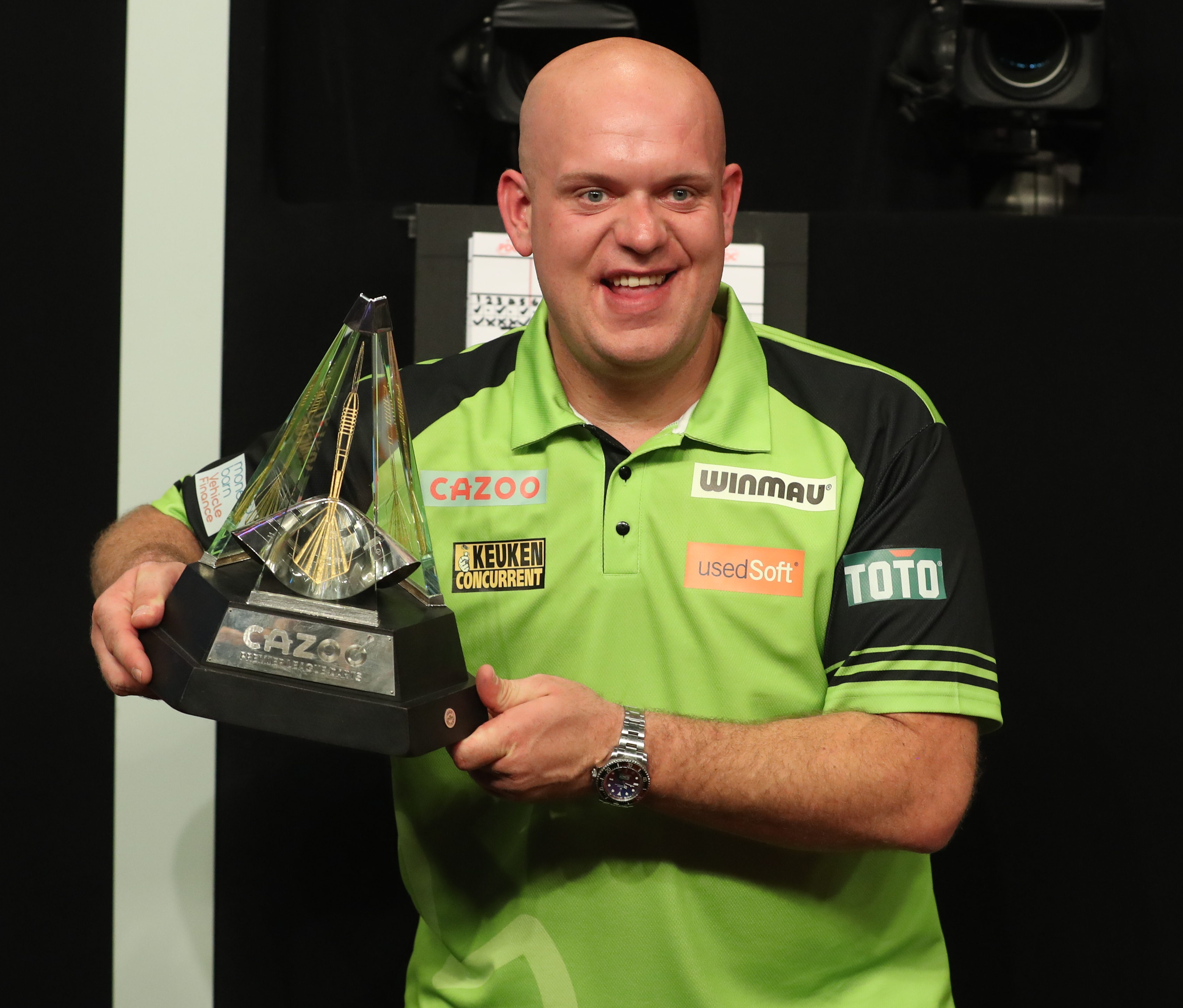
Van Gerwen after winning the 2022 Premier League

In his 2022 World Championship opener, Van Gerwen beat Chas Barstow before withdrawing prior to his third-round match with Chris Dobey after testing positive for COVID-19. In July, Van Gerwen reached the final of the World Matchplay for the first time in six years, where he defeated Gerwyn Price to win his third World Matchplay title, meaning that he had won at every PDC Premier Event that was held in 2022 at least three times.

Van Gerwen also added to two further ranking TV titles like the World Grand Prix for the sixth time, beating Nathan Aspinall in the final; and won the 2022 Players Championship Finals with an 11–6 victory over Rob Cross. He also won the 2022 Premier League against Joe Cullen in the final.

=== 2023: Seventh Premier League Title ===
Van Gerwen opened his 2023 World Championship campaign with a 3–0 victory over Lewy Williams, before defeating Mensur Suljović 4–2 with an average of 107.66. A fourth round win over Dirk van Duijvenbode was followed by whitewash victories over Chris Dobey and Dimitri Van den Bergh, the latter with a 108.28 average, qualified Van Gerwen for his sixth World Darts Championship final, where he lost 7–4 to Michael Smith.

At the 2023 UK Open, Van Gerwen was the runner-up, winning matches against Dave Chisnall, Martijn Kleermaker, Luke Humphries, Nathan Aspinall and Dimitri Van den Bergh, before losing the final to Andrew Gilding in a deciding leg.

An 11–5 victory over Gerwyn Price saw Van Gerwen defend his title in the 2023 Premier League, a record seventh title in the competition moving him clear of Phil Taylor.

At the 2023 Players Championship Finals, Van Gerwen broke the record for the highest average in the tournament's history, defeating Ross Smith 6–1 with an average of 118.52. He eventually was the runner-up after he lost to Luke Humphries 11–9 in the final, despite pinning his 10th televised 9-dart finish.

=== 2024 ===
In the 2024 World Championship, Van Gerwen cruised through his first three matches, defeating Keane Barry, Richard Veenstra, and Stephen Bunting without dropping a single set to reach the quarterfinals. However, in his next match, poor finishing by Van Gerwen led to a shock 5–3 defeat to the unseeded Pro Tour qualifier Scott Williams. At the Masters, Van Gerwen reached the final, but was defeated 11–7 by Stephen Bunting.

At the 2024 UK Open, Van Gerwen suffered a shock fourth-round defeat to Mensur Suljović, losing five legs on the spin en route to a 7–10 loss. He achieved four nightly wins during the 2024 Premier League league phase, finishing third in the table and qualifying for the playoffs. He lost to Luke Humphries 10–5 in the semi-finals. He reached the final of the 2024 World Matchplay but lost 18–15 to Luke Humphries.

=== 2025 ===
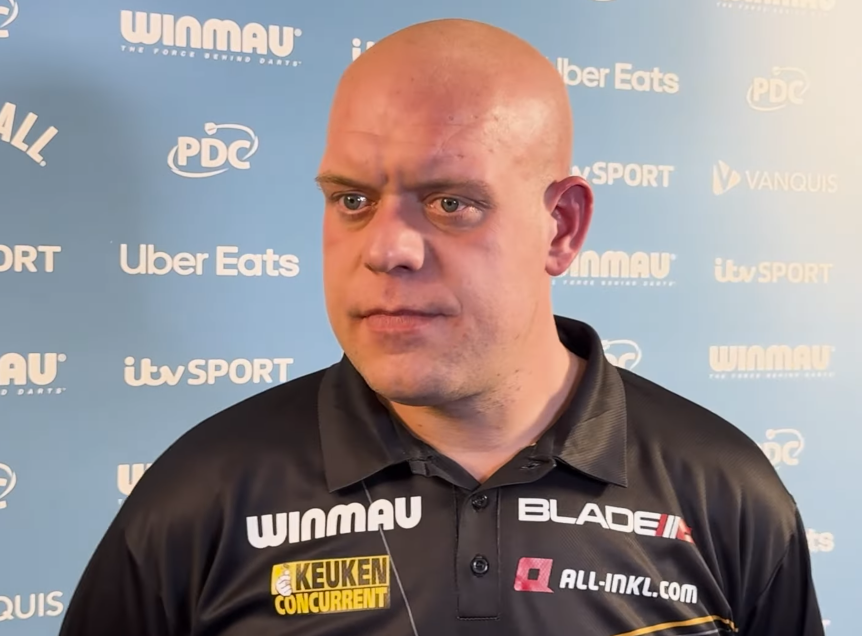
Van Gerwen at the 2025 PDC World Masters

In his campaign at the 2025 World Championship, Van Gerwen was the third seed. He whitewashed James Hurrell 3–0 in the second round, then defeated Brendan Dolan 4–2 before securing another 4–2 victory in the fourth round against Jeffrey de Graaf. A 5–3 win against Callan Rydz saw him progress to the semi-finals, where he beat Chris Dobey 6–1 to enter his seventh world championship final. Van Gerwen lost the final to Luke Littler 7–3, with Littler beating Van Gerwen's record as the youngest PDC world champion.

After hitting a nine-dart finish against Ryan Searle in the third round of the German Darts Grand Prix, Van Gerwen went on to win the tournament by defeating Gian van Veen 8–5 in the final. During the 2025 Premier League, Van Gerwen missed out on qualification for the play-offs for only the second time in 13 years after losing 6–2 to Nathan Aspinall in the quarter-finals on night 16, who took the last remaining place. He ended the 2025 league stage without achieving a nightly win. At the 2025 World Series of Darts Finals, Van Gerwen defeated Luke Littler 11–7 in the final to end a two-year wait for a major trophy since he won the 2023 iteration of the same competition.

In October, Van Gerwen was a semi-finalist at the European Championship, being beaten 11–9 by eventual champion Gian van Veen. Van Gerwen failed to qualify for the Players Championship Finals for the first time in his career after withdrawing from the final three Players Championship events of the year and finishing outside of the top 64 on the Players Championship Order of Merit.

=== 2026 ===
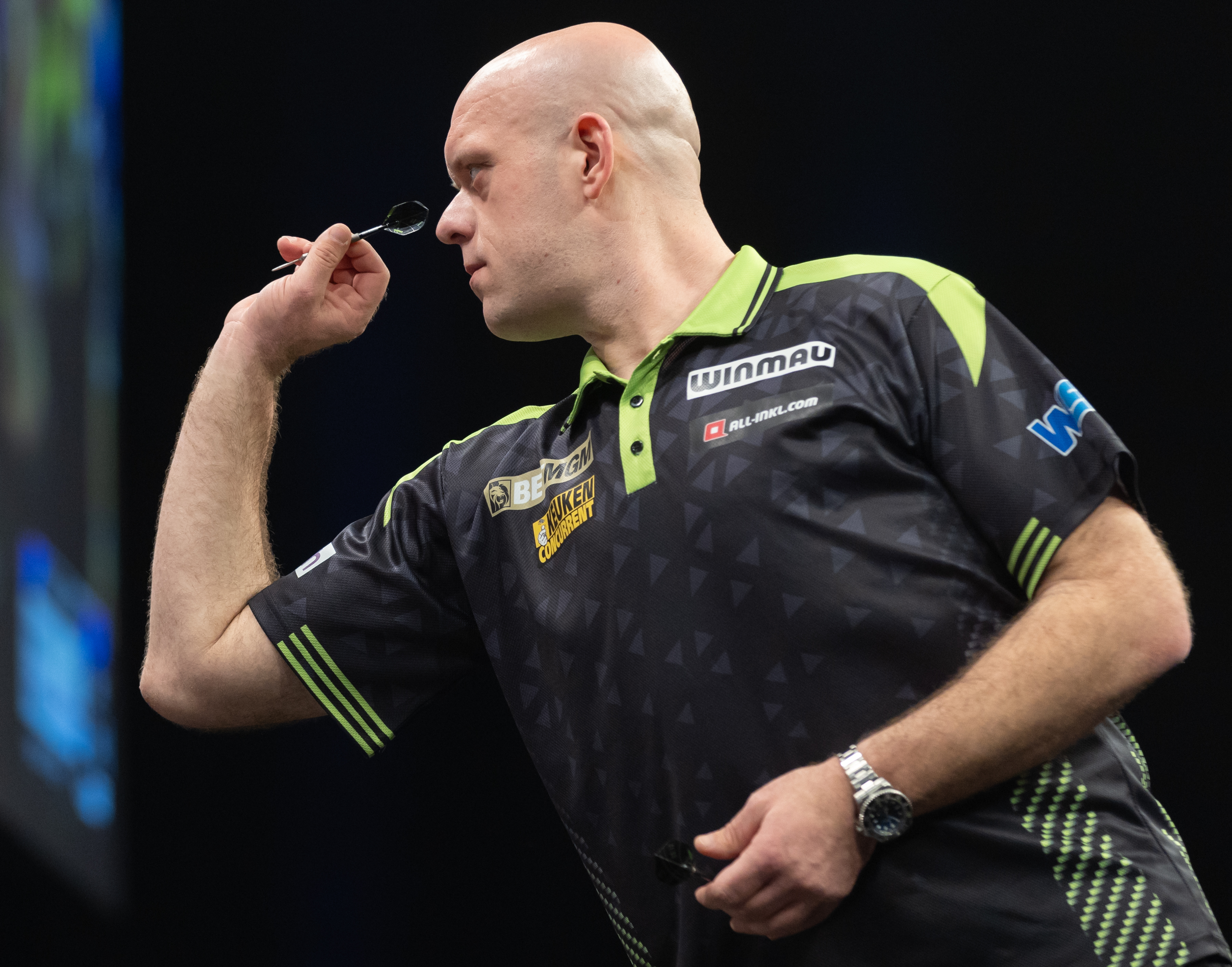
Van Gerwen on night eight of the 2026 Premier League

At the 2026 World Championship, Van Gerwen followed victories over Mitsuhiko Tatsunami and William O'Connor with a 4–1 win against Arno Merk to progress to the fourth round. He was eliminated by Gary Anderson in a 4–1 defeat, marking Van Gerwen's earliest World Championship exit in a decade. He won his 17th World Series title at the Bahrain Darts Masters, defeating Gian van Veen 8–6 in the final. He reached the final of the inaugural Saudi Arabia Darts Masters a week later, where he lost 8–5 to Luke Littler.

At Players Championship 15 in May, Van Gerwen won his first Players Championship title since October 2024 by defeating Dirk van Duijvenbode 8–5 in the final; this came after averaging 122.34 in a semi-final whitewash win over Martin Schindler. He earned his sole Premier League nightly win of 2026 on the opening night of the tournament, beating Gian van Veen 6–4 in the final. Van Gerwen failed to qualify for the Premier League play-offs for the second year in a row, finishing the league stage in sixth place on 18 points. He won his second World Series title of the year at the Nordic Darts Masters, defeating Luke Humphries 8–7 in the final. At the World Cup of Darts, he partnered Van Veen for the Netherlands and the pair reached the final, where they were defeated 10–5 by England. Following a second-round exit at the World Matchplay, Van Gerwen fell to number seven in the PDC World Rankings, his first time outside of the top four since January 2013. Van Gerwen later fell outside the top 10 in the rankings, following a 6–3 defeat to Kevin Doets in the first round at the European Championship.

== Playing style and persona ==
Van Gerwen leans forward quite a lot on the oche and throws at a very fast pace and scores extremely heavily meaning he is able to build up momentum over his opponents in a matter of seconds. When he does make a mistake he is usually able to confine it to history and refocus on the next leg. His playing style is instinctive and natural. He is known to hit purple patches during matches, where he can instantly elevate his game to exceptionally high levels.

He did so in winning the first three PDC major titles of his career, firstly in the 2012 Grand Prix final, where he came back from 1–4 down in sets to triumph 6–4 over Mervyn King, secondly in the 2013 Premier League final he came from 2–5 down to win five successive legs and eventually won 10–8, and thirdly winning seven consecutive legs against Phil Taylor in claiming the 2013 Players Championship Finals title.

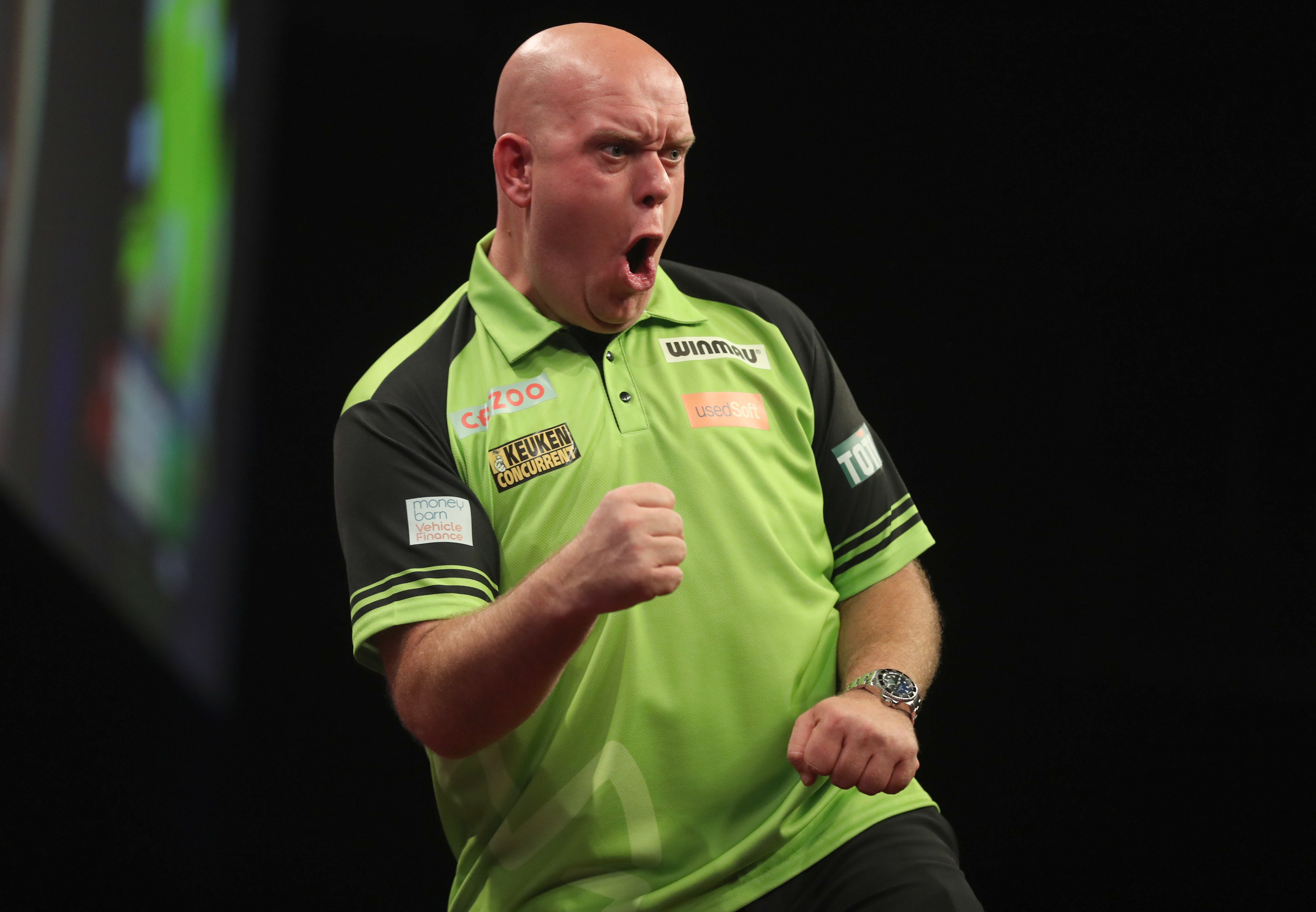
Van Gerwen pictured celebrating in his iconic green shirt

The most striking examples of his ability to date include setting a televised average world record of 123.40 in the 2016 Premier League in a 7–1 victory over Michael Smith. Having started with four 11-dart legs or better in the first six legs, he missed double 18 three times for an average of over 130 which would have earned a shutout win had he found the double. He was also a double 12 away from hitting back-to-back nine-dart finishes in the 2013 World Championship semi-finals.

Five-time World Champion Eric Bristow has described him as fearless, and Van Gerwen has said he is not scared of any player.

He celebrates important visits to the board with sudden short-range headbutts and a bouncing double fist-pump. Such exuberant celebrations have created negative reactions among some of his fellow players, with 2004 World Masters winner Mervyn King calling it disrespectful.

Van Gerwen has traditionally worn a green shirt while in competition, which has now become synonymous with his image and has seen him dubbed "The Green Machine". His supporters are known to chant "Oh, Michael van Gerwen" to the tune of his walk-on song, "Seven Nation Army" by the White Stripes.

== Personal life ==
In August 2014, Van Gerwen married his longtime girlfriend, Daphne Govers. They have a daughter born in August 2017 and a son born in April 2020. In May 2025, he announced that he and Govers had separated.

In December 2014, Sky Sports televised a one-hour documentary called "Mighty Mike" which charted his rise in darts as well as his life away from the sport. He is a supporter of the Dutch football club PSV Eindhoven.

In May 2018, he was appointed Knight of the Order of Orange-Nassau by his local Mayor on behalf of Willem-Alexander, King of the Netherlands.

In 2022, he underwent surgery on his right arm for carpal tunnel syndrome.

== World Championship results ==
=== BDO World Championship ===
- 2007: First round (lost to Gary Robson 2–3)

=== PDC World Championship ===
- 2008: First round (lost to Phil Taylor 2–3)
- 2009: Second round (lost to Phil Taylor 0–4)
- 2010: Second round (lost to James Wade 2–4)
- 2011: First round (lost to Mensur Suljović 1–3)
- 2012: Third round (lost to Simon Whitlock 3–4)
- 2013: Runner-up (lost to Phil Taylor 4–7)
- 2014: Winner (beat Peter Wright 7–4)
- 2015: Semi-finals (lost to Gary Anderson 3–6)
- 2016: Third round (lost to Raymond van Barneveld 3–4)
- 2017: Winner (beat Gary Anderson 7–3)
- 2018: Semi-finals (lost to Rob Cross 5–6)
- 2019: Winner (beat Michael Smith 7–3)
- 2020: Runner-up (lost to Peter Wright 3–7)
- 2021: Quarter-finals (lost to Dave Chisnall 0–5)
- 2022: Third round (withdrew due to positive test for COVID-19)
- 2023: Runner-up (lost to Michael Smith 4–7)
- 2024: Quarter-finals (lost to Scott Williams 3–5)
- 2025: Runner-up (lost to Luke Littler 3–7)
- 2026: Fourth round (lost to Gary Anderson 1–4)

== Career finals ==
=== BDO major finals: 1 (1 title) ===
Outcome	No.	Year	Championship	Opponent in the final	Score (Note: (l) = score in legs, (s) = score in sets, (m) = matches won.)	Ref.
Winner	1.	2006	World Masters	(England) Martin Adams	7–5 (s)	

=== PDC major finals: 65 (48 titles) ===
Legend
World Championship (3–4)
World Matchplay (3–2)
World Grand Prix (6–1)
Grand Slam (3–1)
Premier League (7–2)
UK Open (3–1)
The Masters (5–1)
Champions League (1–1)
European Championship (4–1)
Players Championship Finals (7–2)
Championship League (0–1)
World Series of Darts Finals (6–0)

Outcome	No.	Year	Championship	Opponent in the final	Score	Ref.
Winner	1.	2012	World Grand Prix	Mervyn King	6–4 (s)	
Runner-up	1.	2012	Grand Slam	Raymond van Barneveld	14–16 (l)	
Runner-up	2.	2013	World Championship	Phil Taylor	4–7 (s)	
Winner	2.	2013	Premier League	Phil Taylor	10–8 (l)	
Runner-up	3.	2013	Championship League	Phil Taylor	3–6 (l)	
Winner	3.	2013	Players Championship Finals	Phil Taylor	11–7 (l)	
Winner	4.	2014	World Championship	Peter Wright	7–4 (s)	
Runner-up	4.	2014	Premier League	Raymond van Barneveld	6–10 (l)	
Runner-up	5.	2014	World Matchplay	Phil Taylor	9–18 (l)	
Winner	5.	2014	World Grand Prix (2)	James Wade	5–3 (s)	
Winner	6.	2014	European Championship	Terry Jenkins	11–4 (l)	
Winner	7.	2015	The Masters	Raymond van Barneveld	11–6 (l)	
Winner	8.	2015	UK Open	Peter Wright	11–5 (l)	
Runner-up	6.	2015	Premier League (2)	Gary Anderson	7–11 (l)	
Winner	9.	2015	World Matchplay	James Wade	18–12 (l)	
Runner-up	7.	2015	World Grand Prix	Robert Thornton	4–5 (s)	
Winner	10.	2015	European Championship (2)	Gary Anderson	11–10 (l)	
Winner	11.	2015	Grand Slam	Phil Taylor	16–13 (l)	
Winner	12.	2015	World Series of Darts Finals	Peter Wright	11–10 (l)	
Winner	13.	2015	Players Championship Finals (2)	Adrian Lewis	11–6 (l)	
Winner	14.	2016	The Masters (2)	Dave Chisnall	11–6 (l)	
Winner	15.	2016	UK Open (2)	Peter Wright	11–4 (l)	
Winner	16.	2016	Premier League (2)	Phil Taylor	11–3 (l)	
Winner	17.	2016	World Matchplay (2)	Phil Taylor	18–10 (l)	
Runner-up	8.	2016	Champions League	Phil Taylor	5–11 (l)	
Winner	18.	2016	World Grand Prix (3)	Gary Anderson	5–2 (s)	
Winner	19.	2016	European Championship (3)	Mensur Suljović	11–1 (l)	
Winner	20.	2016	Grand Slam (2)	James Wade	16–8 (l)	
Winner	21.	2016	World Series of Darts Finals (2)	Peter Wright	11–9 (l)	
Winner	22.	2016	Players Championship Finals (3)	Dave Chisnall	11–3 (l)	
Winner	23.	2017	World Championship (2)	Gary Anderson	7–3 (s)	
Winner	24.	2017	The Masters (3)	Gary Anderson	11–7 (l)	
Winner	25.	2017	Premier League (3)	Peter Wright	11–10 (l)	
Winner	26.	2017	European Championship (4)	Rob Cross	11–7 (l)	
Winner	27.	2017	Grand Slam (3)	Peter Wright	16–12 (l)	
Winner	28.	2017	World Series of Darts Finals (3)	Gary Anderson	11–6 (l)	
Winner	29.	2017	Players Championship Finals (4)	Jonny Clayton	11–2 (l)	
Winner	30.	2018	The Masters (4)	Raymond van Barneveld	11–9 (l)	
Winner	31.	2018	Premier League (4)	Michael Smith	11–4 (l)	
Winner	32.	2018	World Grand Prix (4)	Peter Wright	5–2 (s)	
Runner-up	9.	2018	Players Championship Finals	Daryl Gurney	9–11 (l)	
Winner	33.	2019	World Championship (3)	Michael Smith	7–3 (s)	
Winner	34.	2019	The Masters (5)	James Wade	11–5 (l)	
Winner	35.	2019	Premier League (5)	Rob Cross	11–5 (l)	
Winner	36.	2019	World Grand Prix (5)	Dave Chisnall	5–2 (s)	
Winner	37.	2019	Champions League	Peter Wright	11–10 (l)	
Winner	38.	2019	World Series of Darts Finals (4)	Danny Noppert	11–2 (l)	
Winner	39.	2019	Players Championship Finals (5)	Gerwyn Price	11–9 (l)	
Runner-up	10.	2020	World Championship (2)	Peter Wright	3–7 (s)	
Winner	40.	2020	UK Open (3)	Gerwyn Price	11–9 (l)	
Winner	41.	2020	Players Championship Finals (6)	Mervyn King	11–10 (l)	
Runner-up	11.	2021	European Championship	Rob Cross	8–11 (l)	
Winner	42.	2022	Premier League (6)	Joe Cullen	11–10 (l)	
Winner	43.	2022	World Matchplay (3)	Gerwyn Price	18–14 (l)	
Winner	44.	2022	World Grand Prix (6)	Nathan Aspinall	5–3 (s)	
Winner	45.	2022	Players Championship Finals (7)	Rob Cross	11–6 (l)	
Runner-up	12.	2023	World Championship (3)	Michael Smith	4–7 (s)	
Runner-up	13.	2023	UK Open	Andrew Gilding	10–11 (l)	
Winner	46.	2023	Premier League (7)	Gerwyn Price	11–5 (l)	
Winner	47.	2023	World Series of Darts Finals (5)	Nathan Aspinall	11–4 (l)	
Runner-up	14.	2023	Players Championship Finals (2)	Luke Humphries	9–11 (l)	
Runner-up	15.	2024	Masters	Stephen Bunting	7–11 (l)	
Runner-up	16.	2024	World Matchplay (2)	Luke Humphries	15–18 (l)	
Runner-up	17.	2025	World Championship (4)	Luke Littler	3–7 (s)	
Winner	48.	2025	World Series of Darts Finals (6)	Luke Littler	11–7 (l)	

=== PDC World Series finals: 28 (18 titles) ===
Outcome	No.	Year	Championship	Opponent in the final	Score
Winner	1.	2013	Dubai Darts Masters	Raymond van Barneveld	11–7 (l)
Runner-up	1.	2013	Sydney Darts Masters	Phil Taylor	3–10 (l)
Winner	2.	2014	Dubai Darts Masters (2)	Peter Wright	11–7 (l)
Runner-up	2.	2014	Perth Darts Masters	Phil Taylor	9–11 (l)
Winner	3.	2014	Singapore Darts Masters	Simon Whitlock	11–8 (l)
Winner	4.	2015	Dubai Darts Masters (3)	Phil Taylor	11–8 (l)
Runner-up	3.	2016	Dubai Darts Masters	Gary Anderson	9–11 (l)
Winner	5.	2016	Shanghai Darts Masters	James Wade	8–3 (l)
Runner-up	4.	2016	Tokyo Darts Masters	Gary Anderson	6–8 (l)
Runner-up	5.	2016	Sydney Darts Masters (2)	Phil Taylor	9–11 (l)
Winner	6.	2016	Perth Darts Masters	Dave Chisnall	11–4 (l)
Runner-up	6.	2017	Dubai Darts Masters (2)	Gary Anderson	7–11 (l)
Winner	7.	2017	Shanghai Darts Masters (2)	Dave Chisnall	8–0 (l)
Winner	8.	2017	US Darts Masters	Daryl Gurney	8–6 (I)
Winner	9.	2018	Auckland Darts Masters	Raymond van Barneveld	11–4 (l)
Runner-up	7.	2018	Brisbane Darts Masters	Rob Cross	6–11 (l)
Winner	10.	2019	Melbourne Darts Masters	Daryl Gurney	8–3 (l)
Winner	11.	2019	New Zealand Darts Masters	Raymond van Barneveld	8–1 (l)
Winner	12.	2021	Nordic Darts Masters	Fallon Sherrock	11–7 (l)
Runner-up	8.	2022	US Darts Masters	Michael Smith	4–8 (l)
Winner	13.	2022	Queensland Darts Masters	Gerwyn Price	8–5 (l)
Winner	14.	2023	US Darts Masters (2)	Jeff Smith	8–0 (l)
Winner	15.	2023	Poland Darts Masters	Dimitri Van den Bergh	8–3 (l)
Runner-up	9.	2024	Bahrain Darts Masters	Luke Littler	5–8 (l)
Winner	16.	2024	Dutch Darts Masters	Luke Littler	8–6 (l)
Winner	17.	2026	Bahrain Darts Masters	Gian van Veen	8–6 (l)
Runner-up	10.	2026	Saudi Arabia Darts Masters	Luke Littler	5–8 (l)
Winner	18.	2026	Nordic Darts Masters (2)	Luke Humphries	8–7 (l)

=== PDC team finals: 5 (3 titles) ===
Outcome	No.	Year	Championship	Team	Teammate	Opponents in the final	Score
Winner	1.	2014	World Cup of Darts	Netherlands	Raymond van Barneveld	England – Phil Taylor and Adrian Lewis	3–0 (m)
Runner-up	1.	2016	World Cup of Darts	Netherlands	Raymond van Barneveld	England – Phil Taylor and Adrian Lewis	2–3 (m)
Winner	2.	2017	World Cup of Darts (2)	Netherlands	Raymond van Barneveld	Wales – Gerwyn Price and Mark Webster	3–1 (m)
Winner	3.	2018	World Cup of Darts (3)	Netherlands	Raymond van Barneveld	Scotland – Gary Anderson and Peter Wright	3–1 (m)
Runner-up	2.	2026	World Cup of Darts	Netherlands	Gian van Veen	England – Luke Littler and Luke Humphries	5–10 (l)

== Performance timeline ==
=== BDO ===
Tournament	2005	2006	2007
BDO World Championship	DNP		1R
World Masters	2R	W	DNP
International Darts League	DNP	QF	RR
World Darts Trophy	DNP	SF	3R
Masters of Darts	DNP	NH	SF

=== PDC ===
Tournament	2007	2008	2009	2010	2011	2012	2013	2014	2015	2016	2017	2018	2019	2020	2021	2022	2023	2024	2025	2026
PDC Ranked televised events
World Championship	DNP	1R	2R	2R	1R	3R	F	W	SF	3R	W	SF	W	F	QF	3R	F	QF	F	4R
World Masters (Note: A non-ranked event until 2025.)	Not held						QF	SF	W	W	W	W	W	1R	2R	QF	QF	F	2R	1R
UK Open	5R	3R	3R	3R	4R	5R	QF	SF	W	W	DNP	3R	4R	W	SF	5R	F	4R	5R	6R
World Matchplay	2R	2R	1R	DNQ		QF	SF	F	W	W	QF	1R	2R	2R	SF	W	1R	F	2R	2R
World Grand Prix	DNQ		1R	DNQ		W	QF	W	F	W	1R	W	W	QF	1R	W	2R	1R	1R	1R
European Championship	NH	DNQ	2R	2R	1R	2R	SF	W	W	W	W	2R	1R	2R	F	1R	QF	2R	SF	1R
Grand Slam (Note: A non-ranked event until 2015.)	RR	RR	DNQ	RR	2R	F	2R	QF	W	W	W	SF	SF	QF	QF	QF	2R	RR	2R	SF
Players Championship Finals	Not held		1R	2R	1R	2R	W	2R	W	W	W	F	W	W	QF	W	F	1R	DNQ	
PDC Non-ranked televised events
Premier League	Did not participate						W	F	F	W	W	W	W	6th	SF	W	W	SF	5th	6th
World Cup	Not held			DNQ	NH	DNQ	2R	W	SF	F	W	W	SF	QF	QF	DNP		2R	DNP	F
World Series Finals	Not held								W	W	W	QF	W	2R	SF	QF	W	SF	W	1R
World Youth Championship	Not held				F	F	Did not participate													
PDC Past major events
US Open	4R	3R	DNP		Not held															
Champions League	Not held									F	RR	SF	W	Not held						
Championship League	NH	DNQ	RR	RR	DNQ	RR	F	Not held												
Career statistics
Year-end ranking	34	32	30	31	39	7	2	1	1	1	1	1	1	1	3	3	2	3	4	

==== European Tour ====
Season	1	2	3	4	5	6	7	8	9	10	11	12	13	14	15
2012	ADO; 3R	GDC; 1R	EDO; 3R	GDM; 1R	DDM; 2R										
2013	UKM; 3R	EDT; SF	EDO; W	ADO; W	GDT; QF	GDC; 3R	GDM; 2R	DDM; SF							
2014	GDC; QF	DDM; W	GDM; F	ADO; WD	GDT; 2R	EDO; 3R	EDG; DNP	EDT; F							
2015	GDC; W	GDT; W	GDM; W	DDM; W	IDO; 3R	EDO; SF	EDT; F	EDM; W	EDG; 2R						
2016	DDM; W	GDM; W	GDT; W	EDM; SF	ADO; QF	EDO; W	IDO; WD	EDT; W	EDG; W	GDC; 3R					
2017	GDC; F	GDM; W	GDO; QF	EDG; F	GDT; DNP	EDM; W	ADO; W	EDO; 3R	DDM; W	GDG; W	IDO; DNP	EDT; W			
2018	EDO; W	GDG; W	GDO; QF	ADO; WD	EDG; W	DDM; W	GDT; W	DDO; 3R	EDM; W	GDC; W	DDC; 2R	IDO; DNP	EDT; W		
2019	EDO; W	GDC; 2R	GDG; W	GDO; W	ADO; W	EDG; QF	DDM; F	DDO; DNP	CDO; 2R	ADC; F	EDM; F	IDO; WD	GDT; 3R		
2020	BDC; 3R	GDC; 3R	EDG; F	IDO; F											
2021	HDT; 3R	GDT; QF													
2022	IDO; 3R	GDC; W	GDG; SF	ADO; W	EDO; W	CDO; QF	EDG; 2R	DDC; 3R	EDM; WD	HDT; 2R	GDO; WD	BDO; 2R	GDT; SF		
2023	BSD; 2R	EDO; QF	IDO; F	GDG; DNP	ADO; SF	DDC; SF	BDO; W	CDO; QF	EDG; DNP	EDM; 2R	GDO; DNP	HDT; QF	GDC; SF		
2024	BDO; 2R	GDG; F	IDO; WD	EDG; SF	ADO; QF	BSD; QF	DDC; SF	EDO; 3R	GDC; QF	FDT; 2R	HDT; W	SDT; DNP	CDO; QF		
2025	BDO; 2R	EDT; SF	IDO; WD	GDG; W	ADO; DNP	EDG; 2R	DDC; WD	EDO; WD	BSD; WD	FDT; 2R	CDO; 3R	HDT; 3R	SDT; WD	GDC; WD	
2026	PDO; WD	EDT; 2R	BDO; SF	GDG; 2R	EDG; QF	ADO; 3R	IDO; QF	BSD; WD	SDO; 3R	EDO; 3R	HDT; 3R	CDO; SF	FDT; 2R	SDT; 2R	DDC; 2R

==== Players Championships ====
Season	1	2	3	4	5	6	7	8	9	10	11	12	13	14	15	16	17	18	19	20	21	22	23	24	25	26	27	28	29	30	31	32	33	34	35	36	37
2008	GIB; DNP		ESS; 2R	WIG; SF	BSO; DNP	BSO; 4R	TEL; 4R	ANT; 3R	GLA; 4R	AMS; DNP	BRI; 5R	BRI; 2R	LVE; QF	BLA; 3R	DNP			KON; 4R	KON; 4R	DRO; 4R	CHI; 4R	NWP; 2R	NWP; 5R	DUB; 4R	DUB; 2R	SCO; 3R	SCO; 4R	KIR; 3R	KIL; 5R	LEI; QF	LEI; 4R						
2009	DON; 3R	GIB; 2R	GIB; QF	GLA; 3R	GLA; 3R	IRV; QF	WIG; 4R	BRE; 5R	COV; 1R	NUL; 2R	NUL; W	TAU; 1R	DER; 4R	NWP; 3R	BAR; 2R	BAR; 2R	DIN; 2R	DIN; 3R	DNP			ATL; 5R	ATL; 2R	SAL; 2R	SAL; 4R	DUB; 2R	DUB; 1R	KIL; 2R	NUL; F	DNP							
2010	GIB; 4R	GIB; DNP	SWI; 4R	DER; QF	GLA; 4R	GLA; DNP	WIG; 5R	CRA; 3R	BAR; 4R	DER; 2R	WIG; 3R	WIG; DNP	SAL; 4R	SAL; 5R	BAR; DNP		HAA; 2R	DNP		LVE; F	LVE; 3R	SYD; DNP	ONT; 2R	ONT; 2R	CRA; DNP	CRA; 3R	NUL; DNP		DUB; 2R	DUB; DNP	KIL; 4R	BNA; 2R	Did not participate				
2011	HAL; 3R	HAL; 3R	DER; 2R	DNP			VIE; 3R	VIE; 3R	CRA; 2R	CRA; DNP	BAR; 2R	BAR; 2R	NUL; QF	NUL; 3R	ONT; DNP	ONT; SF	DER; 2R	DER; 4R	NUL; DNP		DUB; F	DUB; 2R	KIL; 3R	GLA; DNP	GLA; QF	ALI; 4R	ALI; 3R	CRA; DNP	CRA; 2R	WIG; QF	WIG; 2R						
2012	ALI; 1R	ALI; 2R	REA; 1R	REA; 3R	CRA; 2R	CRA; 3R	BIR; 3R	BIR; W	CRA; 3R	CRA; 3R	BAR; W	BAR; SF	DUB; W	DUB; 2R	KIL; 3R	KIL; W	CRA; SF	CRA; W	BAR; SF	BAR; W																	
2013	WIG; QF	WIG; W	WIG; DNP		CRA; SF	CRA; W	BAR; SF	BAR; 2R	DUB; QF	DUB; SF	Did not participate				BAR; 3R	BAR; 3R																					
2014	BAR; 3R	BAR; W	CRA; 4R	CRA; 3R	WIG; 4R	WIG; 1R	WIG; DNP		CRA; 3R	CRA; 3R	COV; 4R	COV; SF	CRA; 3R	CRA; W	DUB; F	DUB; 4R	CRA; SF	CRA; W	COV; DNP																		
2015	BAR; 1R	BAR; DNP	BAR; 3R	BAR; W	BAR; 4R	COV; W	COV; QF	COV; DNP	CRA; SF	CRA; SF	Did not participate				BAR; QF	BAR; 3R	DUB; QF	DUB; 4R	COV; DNP																		
2016	BAR; QF	BAR; F	BAR; W	BAR; F	BAR; F	Did not participate								BAR; W	BAR; W	BAR; W	DUB; W	DUB; 4R	BAR; DNP																		
2017	BAR; DNP		BAR; 3R	BAR; SF	MIL; SF	MIL; W	BAR; DNP		WIG; W	WIG; 4R	Did not participate								DUB; 3R	DUB; QF	BAR; DNP																
2018	BAR; W	BAR; W	BAR; DNP		MIL; W	MIL; 3R	BAR; DNP		WIG; W	WIG; QF	Did not participate								DUB; QF	DUB; 1R	BAR; DNP																
2019	WIG; W	WIG; QF	WIG; W	WIG; 4R	Did not participate										BAR; SF	BAR; 3R	Did not participate						BAR; QF	BAR; Did not participate				DUB; 2R	BAR; DNP								
2020	BAR; 3R	BAR; 4R	WIG; F	WIG; QF	WIG; 3R	WIG; F	BAR; QF	BAR; 1R	MIL; W	MIL; 3R	MIL; W	MIL; 1R	MIL; 2R	NIE; SF	NIE; 2R	NIE; W	NIE; 3R	NIE; QF	COV; DNP			COV; 3R	COV; 2R														
2021	BOL; 3R	BOL; 4R	BOL; 1R	BOL; SF	MIL; DNP				NIE; 1R	NIE; 2R	NIE; 2R	NIE; 4R	MIL; SF	MIL; F	MIL; 4R	MIL; DNP	COV; QF	COV; 3R	COV; 1R	COV; F	BAR; 3R	BAR; 1R	BAR; DNP	BAR; 4R	BAR; 4R	BAR; 3R	BAR; 4R	BAR; QF	BAR; W	BAR; SF							
2022	BAR; 3R	BAR; 3R	WIG; SF	WIG; 2R	BAR; 2R	BAR; DNP	NIE; 3R	NIE; W	BAR; QF	BAR; W	BAR; DNP	BAR; 2R	Did not participate																								
2023	BAR; 1R	BAR; 3R	BAR; DNP		BAR; 1R	BAR; QF	HIL; W	HIL; 4R	WIG; DNP		LEI; 1R	LEI; 4R	Did not participate						BAR; 2R	BAR; 1R	BAR; 1R	BAR; 4R	BAR; 3R	BAR; 3R	BAR; DNP				BAR; 1R	BAR; DNP							
2024	WIG; DNP		LEI; SF	LEI; 3R	HIL; 4R	HIL; 4R	LEI; 2R	LEI; 3R	HIL; 1R	HIL; 1R	HIL; 1R	HIL; QF	Did not participate					MIL; QF	MIL; 3R	WIG; 3R	WIG; W	Did not participate					WIG; W	WIG; 1R	LEI; DNP								
2025	WIG; DNP		ROS; 1R	ROS; DNP	LEI; QF	LEI; 2R	HIL; 1R	DNP			LEI; 1R	LEI; 1R	ROS; 1R	ROS; 4R	HIL; 1R	Did not participate								MIL; 4R	MIL; 2R	HIL; 1R	HIL; DNP	LEI; 3R	LEI; 4R	LEI; DNP	WIG; 1R	WIG; DNP					
2026	HIL; SF	HIL; QF	Did not participate				LEI; 4R	LEI; 3R	Did not participate				HIL; 3R	HIL; 3R	LEI; W	LEI; 1R	Did not participate						LEI; 1R	LEI; 2R	HIL; 3R	HIL; DNP	LEI; 1R	LEI; 3R	ROS; 1R	ROS; QF	ROS; 4R	ROS; 3R	LEI; SF	LEI; QF			

==== World Series ====
Season	1	2	3	4	5	6	7
2013	DUB; W	SYD; F					
2014	DUB; W	SIN; W	PER; F	SYD; 1R			
2015	DUB; W	JPN; SF	PER; SF	SYD; QF	AUC; QF		
2016	DUB; F	AUC; QF	SHA; W	TOK; F	SYD; F	PER; W	
2017	DUB; F	SHA; W	USA; W	Did not participate			GER; QF
2018	GER; QF	USA; QF	SHA; SF	AUC; W	MEL; SF	BRI; F	
2019	USA; QF	GER; 1R	BRI; QF	MEL; W	NZE; W		
2020
2021	NOR; W						
2022	USA; F	NOR; QF	DUT; 1R	QUE; W	NSW; 1R	NZE; QF	
2023	BAH; DNP	NOR; QF	USA; W	POL; W	NZE; DNP	NSW; DNP	
2024	BAH; F	DUT; W	USA; QF	NOR; DNP	POL; SF	AUS; DNP	NZE; DNP
2025	BAH; DNP	DUT; QF	NOR; DNP	USA; QF	POL; QF	AUS; DNP	NZE; DNP
2026	BAH; W	KSA; F	NOR; W	USA; DNP	NZE; DNP	AUS; DNP	

==== Youth Tour ====
Season	1	2	3	4	5	6	7	8	9	10	11	12	13	14	15
2011	DER; DNP	BAR; QF	WIG; QF	CRA; 3R	BAR; QF	WIG; W	VIE; 3R	CRA; W	BAR; SF	NUL; SF	DER; W	NUL; 2R	DUB; SF	KIL; W	GLA; 2R

Key

Performance Table Legend
W	Won the tournament	F	Finalist	SF	Semifinalist	QF	Quarterfinalist	#R; RR; Prel.	Lost in # round Round-robin; Preliminary round	DQ	Disqualified
DNQ	Did not qualify	DNP	Did not participate	WD	Withdrew	NH	Tournament not held	#R; RR; Prel.	Lost in # round Round-robin; Preliminary round	NYF	Not yet founded

== Titles ==
The following is a list of the 160 PDC titles won by Michael van Gerwen in his career.

Professional Darts Corporation

- Majors (48)
  - World Championship (3): 2014, 2017, 2019
  - World Matchplay (3): 2015, 2016, 2022
  - World Grand Prix (6): 2012, 2014, 2016, 2018, 2019, 2022
  - UK Open (3): 2015, 2016, 2020
  - Grand Slam of Darts (3): 2015, 2016, 2017
  - European Championship (4): 2014, 2015, 2016, 2017
  - Premier League (7): 2013, 2016, 2017, 2018, 2019, 2022, 2023
  - Players Championship Finals (7): 2013, 2015, 2016, 2017, 2019, 2020, 2022
  - World Masters (5): 2015, 2016, 2017, 2018, 2019
  - World Series Finals (6): 2015, 2016, 2017, 2019, 2023, 2025
  - Champions League of Darts (1): 2019
- World Cup (3)
  - 2014, 2017, 2018
- World Series (18)
  - Auckland Masters (1): 2018
  - Bahrain Masters (1): 2026
  - Dubai Masters (3): 2013, 2014, 2015
  - Dutch Masters (1): 2024
  - Melbourne Masters (1): 2019
  - New Zealand Masters (1): 2019
  - Nordic Masters (2): 2021, 2026
  - Perth Masters (1): 2016
  - Poland Masters (1): 2023
  - Queensland Masters (1): 2022
  - Shanghai Masters (2): 2016, 2017
  - Singapore Masters (1): 2014
  - U.S. Masters (2): 2017, 2023
- Pro Tour (91)
  - European Tour (38)
    - Austrian Open (4): 2013, 2017, 2019, 2022
    - Belgian Open (1): 2023
    - Dutch Masters (5): 2014, 2015, 2016, 2017, 2019
    - European Grand Prix (2): 2016, 2018
    - European Matchplay (3): 2015, 2017, 2018
    - European Open (5): 2013, 2016, 2018, 2019, 2022
    - European Trophy (3): 2016, 2017, 2018
    - German Championship (3): 2015, 2018, 2022
    - German Grand Prix (4): 2017, 2018, 2019, 2025
    - German Masters (3): 2015, 2016, 2017
    - German Open (1): 2019
    - Gibraltar Trophy (3): 2015, 2016, 2018
    - Hungarian Trophy (1): 2024
  - Players Championships (37)
    - 2009 (1): 12
    - 2012 (6): 8, 11, 13, 16, 18, 20
    - 2013 (2): 2, 6
    - 2014 (3): 2, 14, 18
    - 2015 (2): 4, 6
    - 2016 (5): 3, 14, 15, 16, 17
    - 2017 (2): 6, 9
    - 2018 (4): 1, 2, 5, 9
    - 2019 (2): 1, 3
    - 2020 (3): 9, 11, 16
    - 2021 (1): 29
    - 2022 (2): 8, 10
    - 2023 (1): 7
    - 2024 (2): 21, 27
    - 2026 (1): 15
  - UK Open Qualifiers (16)
    - 2012 (1): 2
    - 2013 (5): 1, 2, 3, 6, 8
    - 2014 (1): 6
    - 2015 (3): 2, 3, 4
    - 2016 (3): 2, 5, 6
    - 2017 (1): 4
    - 2018 (2): 1, 2

== Nine-dart finishes ==
Michael van Gerwen televised nine-dart finishes
Date	Opponent	Tournament	Method	Prize
17 February 2007	(Netherlands) Raymond van Barneveld	Masters of Darts	T20, 2 x T19; 3 x T20; T20, T17, D18	€10,000
25 July 2012	(England) Steve Beaton	World Matchplay	3 x T20; 3 x T20; T20, T19, D12	£2,500
30 December 2012	(England) James Wade	PDC World Championship	3 x T20; 2 x T20, T19; 2 x T20, D12	£7,500
26 October 2014	(Netherlands) Raymond van Barneveld	European Championship	2 x T20, T19; 3 x T20; 2 x T20, D12	£5,000
5 March 2016	(England) Rob Cross	UK Open	3 x T20; 3 x T20; T20, T19, D12	£10,000
23 November 2019	(England) Adrian Lewis	Players Championship Finals	3 x T20; 2 x T20, T19; 2 x T20, D12	N/A
8 March 2020	(Northern Ireland) Daryl Gurney	UK Open	3 x T20; 3 x T20; T20, T19, D12	N/A
27 November 2022	(England) Rob Cross	Players Championship Finals	2 x T20, T19; 3 x T20; 2 x T20, D12	N/A
17 September 2023	(England) Luke Humphries	World Series Finals	T20, 2 x T19; 3 x T20; T20, T17, D18	N/A
26 November 2023	(England) Luke Humphries	Players Championship Finals	3 x T20; 3 x T20; T20, T19, D12	N/A
21 November 2026	(England) Tom Sykes	Grand Slam of Darts	3 x T20; 3 x T20; T20, T19, D12	N/A

== High averages ==
Michael van Gerwen holds the highest televised average of 123.40 thrown in the 2016 Premier League against Michael Smith, getting a match dart for a 133.18 average in the seventh leg.

Michael van Gerwen televised high averages
Number	Average	Date	Opponent	Tournament	Stage	Score
1	123.40	25 February 2016	(England) Michael Smith	Premier League	League	7–1 (l)
2	121.86	31 October 2012	(England) Steve Beaton	Championship League	Group (8)	6–0 (l)
3	118.52	25 November 2023	(England) Ross Smith	Players Championship Finals	Second round	6–1 (l)
4	118.21	23 August 2014	(Australia) Paul Nicholson	Perth Darts Masters	Quarter-final	8–3 (l)
5	117.95	7 April 2016	(Scotland) Robert Thornton	Premier League	League	7–5 (l)
6	116.90	23 April 2015	(England) James Wade	Premier League	League	7–0 (l)
7	116.67	3 March 2016	(Scotland) Peter Wright	Premier League	League	7–2 (l)
8	115.19	14 November 2021	(England) Joe Cullen	Grand Slam	Group stage	5–2 (l)

Sporting positions
Preceded by Phil Taylor	PDC World Number One; 1 January 2014 – 3 January 2021	Succeeded by Gerwyn Price
Records
Preceded by Phil Taylor	World record highest televised average 25 February 2016–present	Succeeded by —
Awards
Preceded by Phil Taylor; Gary Anderson	PDC Player of the Year; 2013; 2015, 2016, 2017, 2018, 2019	Succeeded by Gary Anderson; Gerwyn Price
