= Dubai Duty Free Tennis Stadium =

Tennis venue in Dubai, United Arab Emirates

Coordinates: 25°14′34.33″N 55°20′33″E

Dubai Tennis Stadium
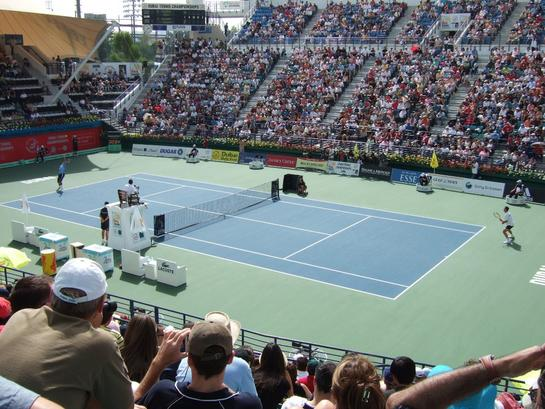
- Interactive map of Dubai Tennis Stadium
- Full name: Dubai Duty Free Tennis Stadium
- Location: Dubai; United Arab Emirates
- Owner: Dubai Duty Free
- Operator: Dubai Duty Free
- Capacity: 5,000 (Tennis); 9,200 (Boxing)
- Surface: Hard outdoors

Construction
- Built: 1995
- Opened: 1996
- Architects: Mario and Luigi Donato
- General contractor: Khansaeb

Tenants
- Dubai Tennis Championships (men's and women's) (Tennis) (1996–present)

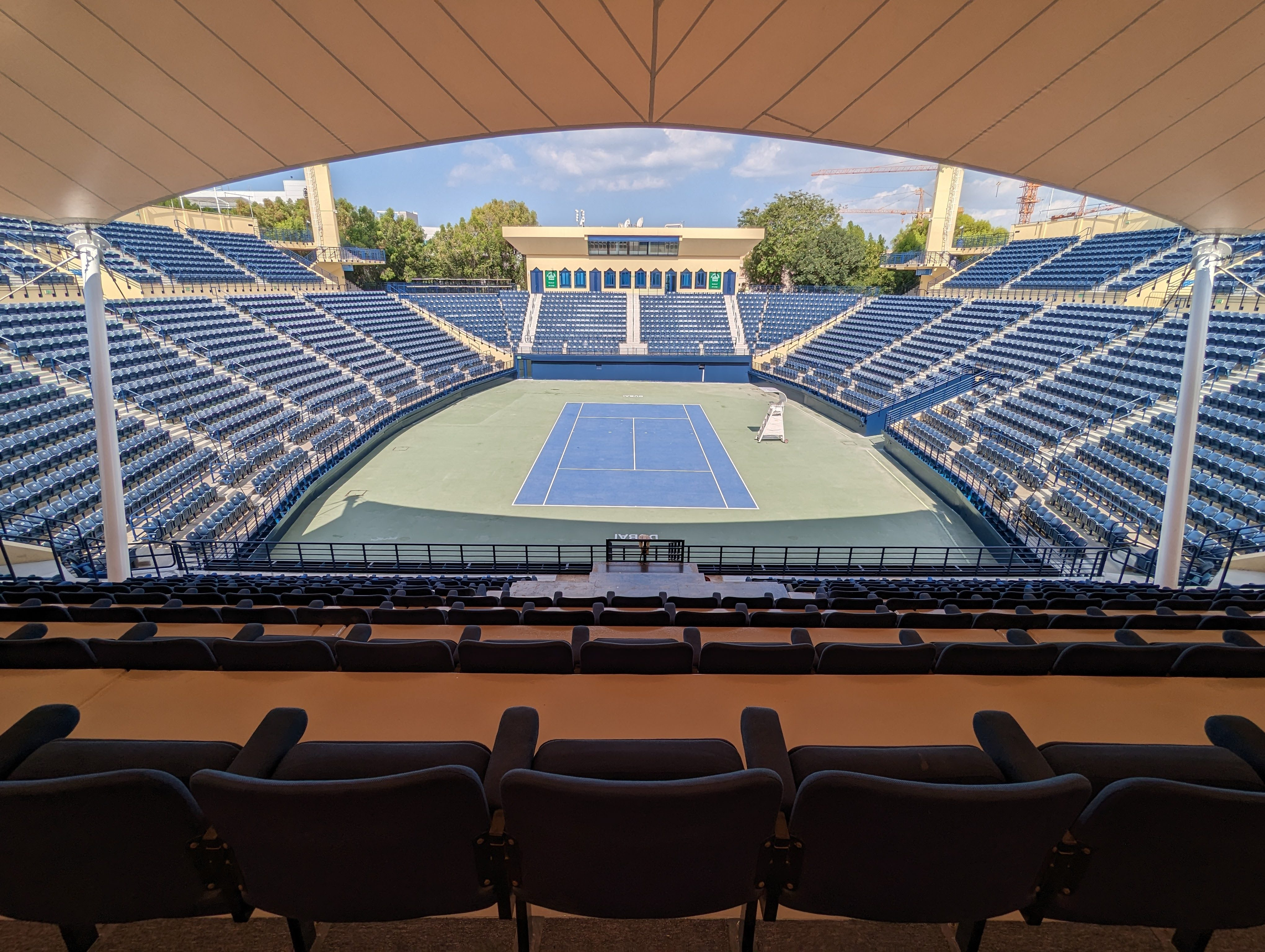
A view of the stadium from the South side spectator area on a non-matchday.

The Dubai Duty Free Tennis Stadium (Arabic: ملعب دبي لكرة المضرب) is a tennis complex in Dubai, United Arab Emirates. The complex is the host of the annual ATP 500 series and WTA 1000 series stop, the Dubai Tennis Championships. The Dubai Tennis Stadium has a capacity of 5,000 people.

== Notable events hosted ==
=== Boxing matches ===
Date	Competition	Main event	Result	Ref.
4 April 2025	BKFC 71 Dubai Day 1: Trout vs Trinidad-Snake	Austin Trout vs Carlos Trinidad-Snak	Trout via SD	
5 April 2025	BKFC 72 Dubai Day 2: Stewart vs Strydom	Kai Stewart vs Tommy Strydom	Kai via UD	
12 December 2025	IBA Pro 13: Pulev vs Gassiev	Kubrat Pulev vs Murat Gassiev	Gassiev via KO (6/12)	
20 December 2025	Misfits Mania – The Fight Before Christmas	Andrew Tate vs Chase DeMoor	DeMoor via MD	

== See also ==
- List of tennis stadiums by capacity
