= 2016 Grand Slam of Darts =

2016 Singha Beer Grand Slam of Darts

Tournament information
- Dates: 12–20 November 2016
- Venue: Wolverhampton Civic Hall
- Location: Wolverhampton
- Country: England
- Organisation(s): PDC
- Format: Legs
- Prize fund: £400,000
- Winner's share: £100,000
- High checkout: 170 (Canada) Jeff Smith (Netherlands) Michael van Gerwen

Champion(s)
- (Netherlands) Michael van Gerwen

The 2016 Singha Beer Grand Slam of Darts, was the tenth staging of the tournament, organised by the Professional Darts Corporation. The event took place from 12 to 20 November 2016 at the Wolverhampton Civic Hall, Wolverhampton, England.

The tournament's defending champion was Michael van Gerwen, who won the tournament in 2015 by beating Phil Taylor in the final 16–13, and he retained his title by defeating James Wade 16–8 in the final.

== Prize money ==
Position (num. of players)		Prize money (Total: £400,000)
Winner	(1)	£100,000
Runner-up	(1)	£50,000
Semi-finalists	(2)	£25,000
Quarter-finalists	(4)	£15,000
Last 16 (second round)	(8)	£7,500
Third in group	(8)	£5,000
Fourth in group	(8)	£2,500
Group winner bonus	(8)	£2,500

== Qualifying ==
=== PDC Qualifying Tournaments ===
PDC Main Tournaments
Tournament	Year	Position	Player	Qualifiers
PDC World Darts Championship	2016	Winner	(Scotland) Gary Anderson	(Scotland) Gary Anderson (Netherlands) Michael van Gerwen (Germany) Max Hopp (England) Adrian Lewis (England) Phil Taylor (Scotland) Peter Wright (England) Dave Chisnall (Austria) Mensur Suljović (England) Nathan Aspinall (Netherlands) Raymond van Barneveld
Grand Slam of Darts	2015	Winner	(Netherlands) Michael van Gerwen	(Scotland) Gary Anderson (Netherlands) Michael van Gerwen (Germany) Max Hopp (England) Adrian Lewis (England) Phil Taylor (Scotland) Peter Wright (England) Dave Chisnall (Austria) Mensur Suljović (England) Nathan Aspinall (Netherlands) Raymond van Barneveld
Premier League Darts	2016	Winner	(Netherlands) Michael van Gerwen	(Scotland) Gary Anderson (Netherlands) Michael van Gerwen (Germany) Max Hopp (England) Adrian Lewis (England) Phil Taylor (Scotland) Peter Wright (England) Dave Chisnall (Austria) Mensur Suljović (England) Nathan Aspinall (Netherlands) Raymond van Barneveld
World Matchplay	2016	Winner	(Netherlands) Michael van Gerwen	(Scotland) Gary Anderson (Netherlands) Michael van Gerwen (Germany) Max Hopp (England) Adrian Lewis (England) Phil Taylor (Scotland) Peter Wright (England) Dave Chisnall (Austria) Mensur Suljović (England) Nathan Aspinall (Netherlands) Raymond van Barneveld
World Grand Prix	2016	Winner	(Netherlands) Michael van Gerwen	(Scotland) Gary Anderson (Netherlands) Michael van Gerwen (Germany) Max Hopp (England) Adrian Lewis (England) Phil Taylor (Scotland) Peter Wright (England) Dave Chisnall (Austria) Mensur Suljović (England) Nathan Aspinall (Netherlands) Raymond van Barneveld
PDC World Youth Championship	2015	Winner	(Germany) Max Hopp	(Scotland) Gary Anderson (Netherlands) Michael van Gerwen (Germany) Max Hopp (England) Adrian Lewis (England) Phil Taylor (Scotland) Peter Wright (England) Dave Chisnall (Austria) Mensur Suljović (England) Nathan Aspinall (Netherlands) Raymond van Barneveld
Masters	2016	Winner	(Netherlands) Michael van Gerwen	(Scotland) Gary Anderson (Netherlands) Michael van Gerwen (Germany) Max Hopp (England) Adrian Lewis (England) Phil Taylor (Scotland) Peter Wright (England) Dave Chisnall (Austria) Mensur Suljović (England) Nathan Aspinall (Netherlands) Raymond van Barneveld
UK Open	2016	Winner	(Netherlands) Michael van Gerwen	(Scotland) Gary Anderson (Netherlands) Michael van Gerwen (Germany) Max Hopp (England) Adrian Lewis (England) Phil Taylor (Scotland) Peter Wright (England) Dave Chisnall (Austria) Mensur Suljović (England) Nathan Aspinall (Netherlands) Raymond van Barneveld
European Championship	2016	Winner	(Netherlands) Michael van Gerwen	(Scotland) Gary Anderson (Netherlands) Michael van Gerwen (Germany) Max Hopp (England) Adrian Lewis (England) Phil Taylor (Scotland) Peter Wright (England) Dave Chisnall (Austria) Mensur Suljović (England) Nathan Aspinall (Netherlands) Raymond van Barneveld
Players Championship Finals	2015	Winner	(Netherlands) Michael van Gerwen	(Scotland) Gary Anderson (Netherlands) Michael van Gerwen (Germany) Max Hopp (England) Adrian Lewis (England) Phil Taylor (Scotland) Peter Wright (England) Dave Chisnall (Austria) Mensur Suljović (England) Nathan Aspinall (Netherlands) Raymond van Barneveld
World Series of Darts Finals	2016	Winner	(Netherlands) Michael van Gerwen	(Scotland) Gary Anderson (Netherlands) Michael van Gerwen (Germany) Max Hopp (England) Adrian Lewis (England) Phil Taylor (Scotland) Peter Wright (England) Dave Chisnall (Austria) Mensur Suljović (England) Nathan Aspinall (Netherlands) Raymond van Barneveld
Champions League of Darts	2016	Winner	(England) Phil Taylor	(Scotland) Gary Anderson (Netherlands) Michael van Gerwen (Germany) Max Hopp (England) Adrian Lewis (England) Phil Taylor (Scotland) Peter Wright (England) Dave Chisnall (Austria) Mensur Suljović (England) Nathan Aspinall (Netherlands) Raymond van Barneveld
PDC World Cup of Darts	2016	Winners	(England) Phil Taylor (England) Adrian Lewis	(Scotland) Gary Anderson (Netherlands) Michael van Gerwen (Germany) Max Hopp (England) Adrian Lewis (England) Phil Taylor (Scotland) Peter Wright (England) Dave Chisnall (Austria) Mensur Suljović (England) Nathan Aspinall (Netherlands) Raymond van Barneveld
PDC World Darts Championship	2016	Runner-Up	(England) Adrian Lewis	(Scotland) Gary Anderson (Netherlands) Michael van Gerwen (Germany) Max Hopp (England) Adrian Lewis (England) Phil Taylor (Scotland) Peter Wright (England) Dave Chisnall (Austria) Mensur Suljović (England) Nathan Aspinall (Netherlands) Raymond van Barneveld
Grand Slam of Darts	2015	Runner-Up	(England) Phil Taylor	(Scotland) Gary Anderson (Netherlands) Michael van Gerwen (Germany) Max Hopp (England) Adrian Lewis (England) Phil Taylor (Scotland) Peter Wright (England) Dave Chisnall (Austria) Mensur Suljović (England) Nathan Aspinall (Netherlands) Raymond van Barneveld
Premier League Darts	2016	Runner-Up	(England) Phil Taylor	(Scotland) Gary Anderson (Netherlands) Michael van Gerwen (Germany) Max Hopp (England) Adrian Lewis (England) Phil Taylor (Scotland) Peter Wright (England) Dave Chisnall (Austria) Mensur Suljović (England) Nathan Aspinall (Netherlands) Raymond van Barneveld
World Matchplay	2016	Runner-Up	(England) Phil Taylor	(Scotland) Gary Anderson (Netherlands) Michael van Gerwen (Germany) Max Hopp (England) Adrian Lewis (England) Phil Taylor (Scotland) Peter Wright (England) Dave Chisnall (Austria) Mensur Suljović (England) Nathan Aspinall (Netherlands) Raymond van Barneveld
World Grand Prix	2016	Runner-Up	(Scotland) Gary Anderson	(Scotland) Gary Anderson (Netherlands) Michael van Gerwen (Germany) Max Hopp (England) Adrian Lewis (England) Phil Taylor (Scotland) Peter Wright (England) Dave Chisnall (Austria) Mensur Suljović (England) Nathan Aspinall (Netherlands) Raymond van Barneveld
PDC World Youth Championship	2015	Runner-Up	(England) Nathan Aspinall	(Scotland) Gary Anderson (Netherlands) Michael van Gerwen (Germany) Max Hopp (England) Adrian Lewis (England) Phil Taylor (Scotland) Peter Wright (England) Dave Chisnall (Austria) Mensur Suljović (England) Nathan Aspinall (Netherlands) Raymond van Barneveld
Masters	2016	Runner-Up	(England) Dave Chisnall	(Scotland) Gary Anderson (Netherlands) Michael van Gerwen (Germany) Max Hopp (England) Adrian Lewis (England) Phil Taylor (Scotland) Peter Wright (England) Dave Chisnall (Austria) Mensur Suljović (England) Nathan Aspinall (Netherlands) Raymond van Barneveld
UK Open	2016	Runner-Up	(Scotland) Peter Wright	(Scotland) Gary Anderson (Netherlands) Michael van Gerwen (Germany) Max Hopp (England) Adrian Lewis (England) Phil Taylor (Scotland) Peter Wright (England) Dave Chisnall (Austria) Mensur Suljović (England) Nathan Aspinall (Netherlands) Raymond van Barneveld
European Championship	2016	Runner-Up	(Austria) Mensur Suljović	(Scotland) Gary Anderson (Netherlands) Michael van Gerwen (Germany) Max Hopp (England) Adrian Lewis (England) Phil Taylor (Scotland) Peter Wright (England) Dave Chisnall (Austria) Mensur Suljović (England) Nathan Aspinall (Netherlands) Raymond van Barneveld
Players Championship Finals	2015	Runner-Up	(England) Adrian Lewis	(Scotland) Gary Anderson (Netherlands) Michael van Gerwen (Germany) Max Hopp (England) Adrian Lewis (England) Phil Taylor (Scotland) Peter Wright (England) Dave Chisnall (Austria) Mensur Suljović (England) Nathan Aspinall (Netherlands) Raymond van Barneveld
World Series of Darts Finals	2016	Runner-Up	(Scotland) Peter Wright	(Scotland) Gary Anderson (Netherlands) Michael van Gerwen (Germany) Max Hopp (England) Adrian Lewis (England) Phil Taylor (Scotland) Peter Wright (England) Dave Chisnall (Austria) Mensur Suljović (England) Nathan Aspinall (Netherlands) Raymond van Barneveld
Champions League of Darts	2016	Runner-Up	(Netherlands) Michael van Gerwen	(Scotland) Gary Anderson (Netherlands) Michael van Gerwen (Germany) Max Hopp (England) Adrian Lewis (England) Phil Taylor (Scotland) Peter Wright (England) Dave Chisnall (Austria) Mensur Suljović (England) Nathan Aspinall (Netherlands) Raymond van Barneveld
PDC World Cup of Darts	2016	Runners-Up	(Netherlands) Michael van Gerwen (Netherlands) Raymond van Barneveld	(Scotland) Gary Anderson (Netherlands) Michael van Gerwen (Germany) Max Hopp (England) Adrian Lewis (England) Phil Taylor (Scotland) Peter Wright (England) Dave Chisnall (Austria) Mensur Suljović (England) Nathan Aspinall (Netherlands) Raymond van Barneveld
Note: Players in italics had already qualified for the tournament.				(Scotland) Gary Anderson (Netherlands) Michael van Gerwen (Germany) Max Hopp (England) Adrian Lewis (England) Phil Taylor (Scotland) Peter Wright (England) Dave Chisnall (Austria) Mensur Suljović (England) Nathan Aspinall (Netherlands) Raymond van Barneveld

At most sixteen players could qualify through this method, where the position in the list depicts the priority of the qualification.

PDC European Tour
Tournament	Event	Position	Player	Qualifiers
2016 European Tour
2016 European Tour	Dutch Darts Masters	Winner	(Netherlands) Michael van Gerwen	(England) James Wade (England) Alan Norris
2016 European Tour	German Darts Masters	Winner	(Netherlands) Michael van Gerwen	(England) James Wade (England) Alan Norris
2016 European Tour	Gibraltar Darts Trophy	Winner	(Netherlands) Michael van Gerwen	(England) James Wade (England) Alan Norris
2016 European Tour	European Darts Matchplay	Winner	(England) James Wade	(England) James Wade (England) Alan Norris
2016 European Tour	Austrian Darts Open	Winner	(England) Phil Taylor	(England) James Wade (England) Alan Norris
2016 European Tour	European Darts Open	Winner	(Netherlands) Michael van Gerwen	(England) James Wade (England) Alan Norris
2016 European Tour	International Darts Open	Winner	(Austria) Mensur Suljović	(England) James Wade (England) Alan Norris
2016 European Tour	European Darts Trophy	Winner	(Netherlands) Michael van Gerwen	(England) James Wade (England) Alan Norris
2016 European Tour	European Darts Grand Prix	Winner	(Netherlands) Michael van Gerwen	(England) James Wade (England) Alan Norris
2016 European Tour	German Darts Championship	Winner	(England) Alan Norris	(England) James Wade (England) Alan Norris
Note: Players in italics had already qualified for the tournament.				(England) James Wade (England) Alan Norris

In case the list of qualifiers from the main tournaments produced fewer than sixteen players, the field of sixteen players is filled from the reserve lists. The first list consists of the winners from 2016 European Tour events, in which the winners shall be selected in ProTour Order of Merit position order at the cut-off date.

PDC Players Championships
Tournament	Event	Position	Player	Qualifiers
2016 Players Championships	Players Championship 1	Winner	(Scotland) Peter Wright	(Netherlands) Benito van de Pas (England) Ian White (Wales) Gerwyn Price (Australia) Simon Whitlock
2016 Players Championships	Players Championship 2	Winner	(England) Stephen Bunting	(Netherlands) Benito van de Pas (England) Ian White (Wales) Gerwyn Price (Australia) Simon Whitlock
2016 Players Championships	Players Championship 3	Winner	(Netherlands) Michael van Gerwen	(Netherlands) Benito van de Pas (England) Ian White (Wales) Gerwyn Price (Australia) Simon Whitlock
2016 Players Championships	Players Championship 4	Winner	(Netherlands) Benito van de Pas	(Netherlands) Benito van de Pas (England) Ian White (Wales) Gerwyn Price (Australia) Simon Whitlock
2016 Players Championships	Players Championship 5	Winner	(England) Ian White	(Netherlands) Benito van de Pas (England) Ian White (Wales) Gerwyn Price (Australia) Simon Whitlock
2016 Players Championships	Players Championship 6	Winner	(England) Josh Payne	(Netherlands) Benito van de Pas (England) Ian White (Wales) Gerwyn Price (Australia) Simon Whitlock
2016 Players Championships	Players Championship 7	Winner	(Wales) Gerwyn Price	(Netherlands) Benito van de Pas (England) Ian White (Wales) Gerwyn Price (Australia) Simon Whitlock
2016 Players Championships	Players Championship 8	Winner	(Wales) Gerwyn Price	(Netherlands) Benito van de Pas (England) Ian White (Wales) Gerwyn Price (Australia) Simon Whitlock
2016 Players Championships	Players Championship 9	Winner	(Netherlands) Benito van de Pas	(Netherlands) Benito van de Pas (England) Ian White (Wales) Gerwyn Price (Australia) Simon Whitlock
2016 Players Championships	Players Championship 10	Winner	(England) Dave Chisnall	(Netherlands) Benito van de Pas (England) Ian White (Wales) Gerwyn Price (Australia) Simon Whitlock
2016 Players Championships	Players Championship 11	Winner	(England) Ian White	(Netherlands) Benito van de Pas (England) Ian White (Wales) Gerwyn Price (Australia) Simon Whitlock
2016 Players Championships	Players Championship 12	Winner	(Scotland) Gary Anderson	(Netherlands) Benito van de Pas (England) Ian White (Wales) Gerwyn Price (Australia) Simon Whitlock
2016 Players Championships	Players Championship 13	Winner	(England) Ian White	(Netherlands) Benito van de Pas (England) Ian White (Wales) Gerwyn Price (Australia) Simon Whitlock
2016 Players Championships	Players Championship 14	Winner	(Netherlands) Michael van Gerwen	(Netherlands) Benito van de Pas (England) Ian White (Wales) Gerwyn Price (Australia) Simon Whitlock
2016 Players Championships	Players Championship 15	Winner	(Netherlands) Michael van Gerwen	(Netherlands) Benito van de Pas (England) Ian White (Wales) Gerwyn Price (Australia) Simon Whitlock
2016 Players Championships	Players Championship 16	Winner	(Netherlands) Michael van Gerwen	(Netherlands) Benito van de Pas (England) Ian White (Wales) Gerwyn Price (Australia) Simon Whitlock
2016 Players Championships	Players Championship 17	Winner	(Netherlands) Michael van Gerwen	(Netherlands) Benito van de Pas (England) Ian White (Wales) Gerwyn Price (Australia) Simon Whitlock
2016 Players Championships	Players Championship 18	Winner	(Australia) Simon Whitlock	(Netherlands) Benito van de Pas (England) Ian White (Wales) Gerwyn Price (Australia) Simon Whitlock
2016 Players Championships	Players Championship 19	Winner	(Australia) Simon Whitlock	(Netherlands) Benito van de Pas (England) Ian White (Wales) Gerwyn Price (Australia) Simon Whitlock
2016 Players Championships	Players Championship 20	Winner	(Netherlands) Benito van de Pas	(Netherlands) Benito van de Pas (England) Ian White (Wales) Gerwyn Price (Australia) Simon Whitlock
Note: Players in italics had already qualified for the tournament.				(Netherlands) Benito van de Pas (England) Ian White (Wales) Gerwyn Price (Australia) Simon Whitlock

In case the list of qualifiers from the main tournaments and the European Tour produced fewer than sixteen players, the field of sixteen players is filled from the reserve lists. The second list consists of the winners from 2016 Players Championship events, in which the winners were selected in ProTour Order of Merit position order at the cut-off date.

=== PDC Qualifying Event ===
A further eight places in the Grand Slam of Darts were filled by qualifiers from a PDC qualifier in Barnsley on 23 October 2016.

- (Scotland) Robert Thornton
- (Belgium) Dimitri Van den Bergh
- (England) Ted Evetts
- (Northern Ireland) Brendan Dolan
- (England) Chris Dobey
- (England) James Wilson
- (England) Nathan Derry
- (England) Darren Webster

=== BDO Qualifying Tournaments ===
Tournament	Year	Position	Player
BDO World Darts Championship	2016	Winner	(England) Scott Waites
BDO World Darts Championship	2016	Runner-Up	(Canada) Jeff Smith
World Masters	2015	Winner	(England) Glen Durrant
BDO World Trophy	2016	Winner	(England) Darryl Fitton

=== BDO ranking qualifiers ===
The remaining four BDO representatives were the top four non-qualified players from the BDO Invitational rankings on 30 September.

- (England) Scott Mitchell
- (Netherlands) Danny Noppert
- (England) Jamie Hughes
- (England) Martin Adams

== Pools ==
Pool A	Pool B	Pool C	Pool D
(PDC Seeded Players)	(PDC Qualifiers)		(BDO Qualifiers)
(Netherlands) Michael van Gerwen (1) (Scotland) Gary Anderson (2) (England) Adrian Lewis (3) (England) Phil Taylor (4) (Scotland) Peter Wright (5) (England) James Wade (6) (Austria) Mensur Suljović (7) (Scotland) Robert Thornton (8)	(England) Dave Chisnall (England) Ian White (Netherlands) Raymond van Barneveld (Netherlands) Benito van de Pas (Australia) Simon Whitlock (Wales) Gerwyn Price (England) Alan Norris (Northern Ireland) Brendan Dolan	(England) James Wilson (Germany) Max Hopp (England) Darren Webster (England) Chris Dobey (Belgium) Dimitri Van den Bergh (England) Nathan Aspinall (England) Nathan Derry (England) Ted Evetts	(England) Glen Durrant (England) Scott Mitchell (Netherlands) Danny Noppert (England) Jamie Hughes (England) Martin Adams (England) Scott Waites (England) Darryl Fitton (Canada) Jeff Smith

== Draw ==
=== Group stage ===
All group matches are best of nine legs
From each group the numbers one and two after three games qualify for the knock-out stage, the numbers three and four are eliminated
NB in Brackets: Number = Seeds; BDO = BDO Darts player; Q = Qualifier
NB: P = Played; W = Won; L = Lost; LF = Legs for; LA = Legs against; +/− = Plus/minus record, in relation to legs; Average = 3-dart average; Pts = Points; Status = Qualified to knockout stage

==== Group A ====
Pos.	Player	P	W	L	LF	LA	+/–	Pts	Status
1	(Netherlands) Michael van Gerwen (1)	3	3	0	15	4	+11	6	Q
2	(Northern Ireland) Brendan Dolan (Q)	3	2	1	11	12	–1	4	Q
3	(Germany) Max Hopp	3	1	2	10	13	–3	2	Eliminated
4	(England) Martin Adams (BDO)	3	0	3	8	15	–7	0	Eliminated

12 November

93.65 Brendan Dolan (Northern Ireland)	5 – 4	(Germany) Max Hopp 89.00
93.64 Michael van Gerwen (Netherlands)	5 – 2	(England) Martin Adams 91.47

13 November

104.58 Michael van Gerwen (Netherlands)	5 – 1	(Northern Ireland) Brendan Dolan 95.13
86.36 Max Hopp (Germany)	5 – 3	(England) Martin Adams 80.47

14 November

95.93 Michael van Gerwen (Netherlands)	5 – 1	(Germany) Max Hopp 87.37
80.87 Brendan Dolan (Northern Ireland)	5 – 3	(England) Martin Adams 80.96

==== Group B ====
Pos.	Player	P	W	L	LF	LA	+/−	Pts	Status
1	(Wales) Gerwyn Price	3	2	1	14	10	+4	4	Q
2	(Scotland) Robert Thornton (8, Q)	3	2	1	13	12	+1	4	Nine-dart shootout
3	(Belgium) Dimitri Van den Bergh (Q)	3	2	1	14	13	+1	4	Nine-dart shootout
4	(England) Scott Waites (BDO)	3	0	3	9	15	–6	0	Eliminated

12 November

92.26 Gerwyn Price (Wales)	4 – 5	(Belgium) Dimitri Van den Bergh 90.15
96.00 Robert Thornton (Scotland)	5 – 3	(England) Scott Waites 91.15

13 November

96.90 Robert Thornton (Scotland)	5 – 4	(Belgium) Dimitri Van den Bergh 90.56
84.46 Gerwyn Price (Wales)	5 – 2	(England) Scott Waites 84.83

15 November

93.48 Robert Thornton (Scotland)	3 – 5	(Wales) Gerwyn Price 91.73
91.60 Dimitri Van den Bergh (Belgium)	5 – 4	(England) Scott Waites 93.13

===== Nine dart shootout =====
With Robert Thornton and Dimitri Van den Bergh finishing level on points and leg difference, a nine-dart shootout between the two took place to see who would play Michael van Gerwen in the second round. The match took place after the conclusion of Tuesday's group matches, and was the first time since the 2013 Grand Slam of Darts that a nine-dart shootout was required. Van den Bergh threw first.

POS	Player	1	2	3	4	5	6	7	8	9	Pts	Status
2	(Scotland) Robert Thornton	60	20	60	20	60	60	20	20	25	345	Advanced to the last 16
3	(Belgium) Dimitri Van den Bergh	20	20	60	60	20	60	20	60	20	340	Eliminated

==== Group C ====
Pos.	Player	P	W	L	LF	LA	+/−	Pts	Status
1	(Scotland) Peter Wright (5)	3	3	0	15	4	+11	6	Q
2	(Canada) Jeff Smith (BDO)	3	2	1	11	13	–2	4	Q
3	(Australia) Simon Whitlock	3	1	2	9	11	–2	2	Eliminated
4	(England) Ted Evetts (Q)	3	0	3	8	15	–7	0	Eliminated

12 November

92.08 Simon Whitlock (Australia)	5 – 1	(England) Ted Evetts 85.69
93.78 Peter Wright (Scotland)	5 – 1	(Canada) Jeff Smith 86.33

13 November

107.36 Peter Wright (Scotland)	5 – 0	(Australia) Simon Whitlock 87.95
90.43 Ted Evetts (England)	4 – 5	(Canada) Jeff Smith 89.29

15 November

100.39 Peter Wright (Scotland)	5 – 3	(England) Ted Evetts 100.39
101.74 Simon Whitlock (Australia)	4 – 5	(Canada) Jeff Smith 96.98

==== Group D ====
Pos.	Player	P	W	L	LF	LA	+/−	Pts	Status
1	(England) Phil Taylor (4)	3	2	1	10	7	+3	4	Q
2	(England) Darryl Fitton (BDO)	3	2	1	11	13	–2	4	Q
3	(England) Darren Webster (Q)	3	1	2	12	10	+2	2	Eliminated
4	(England) Ian White	3	1	2	10	13	–3	2	Eliminated

12 November

93.62 Ian White (England)	5 – 3	(England) Darren Webster 93.49
104.30 Phil Taylor (England)	5 – 1	(England) Darryl Fitton 84.90

13 November

92.94 Phil Taylor (England)	5 – 1	(England) Ian White 84.13
88.99 Darren Webster (England)	4 – 5	(England) Darryl Fitton 87.30

14 November

87.08 Phil Taylor (England)	0 – 5	(England) Darren Webster 96.35
88.86 Ian White (England)	4 – 5	(England) Darryl Fitton 87.27

==== Group E ====
Pos.	Player	P	W	L	LF	LA	+/–	Pts	Status
1	(Scotland) Gary Anderson (2)	3	3	0	15	6	+9	6	Q
2	(England) Glen Durrant (BDO)	3	2	1	14	6	+8	4	Q
3	(England) Nathan Derry (Q)	3	1	2	5	14	–9	2	Eliminated
4	(England) Alan Norris	3	0	3	7	15	–8	0	Eliminated

12 November

97.65 Alan Norris (England)	4 – 5	(England) Nathan Derry 91.56
100.66 Gary Anderson (Scotland)	5 – 4	(England) Glen Durrant 98.52

13 November

89.46 Gary Anderson (Scotland)	5 – 0	(England) Nathan Derry 82.44
95.25 Alan Norris (England)	1 – 5	(England) Glen Durrant 94.87

14 November

97.33 Gary Anderson (Scotland)	5 – 2	(England) Alan Norris 94.60
76.20 Nathan Derry (England)	0 – 5	(England) Glen Durrant 97.60

==== Group F ====
Pos.	Player	P	W	L	LF	LA	+/−	Pts	Status
1	(Netherlands) Raymond van Barneveld	3	3	0	15	6	+9	6	Q
2	(Netherlands) Danny Noppert (BDO)	3	2	1	12	10	+2	4	Q
3	(Austria) Mensur Suljović (7)	3	1	2	11	13	–2	2	Eliminated
4	(England) Nathan Aspinall	3	0	3	6	15	–9	0	Eliminated

12 November

98.40 Mensur Suljović (Austria)	3 – 5	(Netherlands) Danny Noppert 101.06
110.15 Raymond van Barneveld (Netherlands)	5 – 1	(England) Nathan Aspinall 97.46

13 November

(104.66) Raymond van Barneveld (Netherlands)	5 – 2	(Netherlands) Danny Noppert (103.88)
(99.50) Mensur Suljović (Austria)	5 – 3	(England) Nathan Aspinall (97.79)

15 November

94.58 Mensur Suljović (Austria)	3 – 5	(Netherlands) Raymond van Barneveld 100.29
88.56 Nathan Aspinall (England)	2 – 5	(Netherlands) Danny Noppert 90.24

==== Group G ====
Pos.	Player	P	W	L	LF	LA	+/–	Pts	Status
1	(England) Jamie Hughes (BDO)	3	2	1	13	10	+3	4	Q
2	(England) James Wade (6)	3	2	1	13	11	+2	4	Q
3	(England) James Wilson (Q)	3	1	2	12	12	0	2	Eliminated
4	(England) Dave Chisnall	3	1	2	8	13	–5	2	Eliminated

12 November

88.73 Dave Chisnall (England)	2 – 5	(England) James Wilson 84.13
91.31 James Wade (England)	5 – 3	(England) Jamie Hughes 86.55

13 November

95.85 James Wade (England)	5 – 3	(England) James Wilson 85.21
102.51 Dave Chisnall (England)	1 – 5	(England) Jamie Hughes 106.32

15 November

100.58 James Wade (England)	3 – 5	(England) Dave Chisnall 98.92
91.00 James Wilson (England)	4 – 5	(England) Jamie Hughes 91.96

==== Group H ====
Pos.	Player	P	W	L	LF	LA	+/–	Pts	Status
1	(Netherlands) Benito van de Pas	3	3	0	15	7	+8	6	Q
2	(England) Chris Dobey (Q)	3	2	1	14	11	+3	4	Q
3	(England) Scott Mitchell (BDO)	3	1	2	9	11	–2	2	Eliminated
4	(England) Adrian Lewis (3)	3	0	3	6	15	–9	0	Eliminated

12 November

95.91 Benito van de Pas (Netherlands)	5 – 4	(England) Chris Dobey 94.36
97.62 Adrian Lewis (England)	1 – 5	(England) Scott Mitchell 107.78

13 November

95.61 Benito van de Pas (Netherlands)	5 – 1	(England) Scott Mitchell 83.35
108.68 Adrian Lewis (England)	3 – 5	(England) Chris Dobey 97.42

14 November

100.19 Adrian Lewis (England)	2 – 5	(Netherlands) Benito van de Pas 100.90
92.74 Chris Dobey (England)	5 – 3	(England) Scott Mitchell 92.61

=== Knockout stage ===
Second round (best of 19 legs); 16–17 November
A1	(Netherlands) Michael van Gerwen (1) 103.24	10
B2	(Scotland) Robert Thornton (8, Q) 94.23	5
B1	(Wales) Gerwyn Price 89.38	9
A2	(Northern Ireland) Brendan Dolan (Q) 91.36	10
C1	(Scotland) Peter Wright (5) 99.69	10
D2	(England) Darryl Fitton (BDO) 92.14	3
D1	(England) Phil Taylor (4) 98.04	10
C2	(Canada) Jeff Smith (BDO) 91.54	5
E1	(Scotland) Gary Anderson (2) 101.12	10
F2	(Netherlands) Danny Noppert (BDO) 100.01	9
F1	(Netherlands) Raymond van Barneveld 98.19	10
E2	(England) Glen Durrant (BDO) 95.50	7
G1	(England) Jamie Hughes (BDO) 90.38	9
H2	(England) Chris Dobey (Q) 94.01	10
H1	(Netherlands) Benito van de Pas 88.81	2
G2	(England) James Wade (6) 92.87	10

Quarter-finals (best of 31 legs); 18–19 November
A1	(Netherlands) Michael van Gerwen (1) 97.33	16
A2	(Northern Ireland) Brendan Dolan (Q) 88.24	3
C1	(Scotland) Peter Wright (5) 103.37	16
D1	(England) Phil Taylor (4) 100.57	10
E1	(Scotland) Gary Anderson (2) 103.81	16
F1	(Netherlands) Raymond van Barneveld 98.24	13
H2	(England) Chris Dobey (Q) 92.00	5
G2	(England) James Wade (6) 92.18	16

Semi-finals (best of 31 legs); 20 November
A1	(Netherlands) Michael van Gerwen (1) 111.17	16
C1	(Scotland) Peter Wright (5) 102.13	10
E1	(Scotland) Gary Anderson (2) 98.36	14
G2	(England) James Wade (6) 91.93	16

Final (best of 31 legs); 20 November
A1	(Netherlands) Michael van Gerwen (1) 98.74	16
G2	(England) James Wade (6) 90.73	8
