= Joe Murnan =

English darts player

Personal information
- Nickname: "Midnight"
- Born: 28 September 1983 (age 43) Hindley, Greater Manchester, England
- Home town: Halliwell, Greater Manchester, England

Sport
- Sport: Darts
- Playing since: 1993
- Darts: 22g Mission Signature
- Laterality: Right-handed
- Walk-on music: "Cotton Eye Joe" by Rednex

Organisation (see split in darts)
- BDO: 2006–2011
- PDC: 2011–present (Tour Card: 2012–2014, 2016–2023)

WDF major events – best performances
- World Masters: Last 40: 2010

PDC premier events – best performances
- World Championship: Last 32: 2016
- World Matchplay: Last 32: 2015
- UK Open: Last 32: 2011, 2014, 2016
- Grand Slam: Group Stage: 2017, 2018
- European Championship: Last 32: 2021
- PC Finals: Last 32: 2015

Other tournament wins
- Years
PDC Challenge Tour	2015 (x2)
Romanian International Darts Open	2011
Players Championships
Players Championship	2015

Joe Eugene Murnan (born 28 September 1983) is an English darts player who competes in Professional Darts Corporation (PDC) events.

== Career ==
Murnan reached the last 40 of the 2010 World Masters, losing 3–0 to Ronald L. Briones.

Murnan qualified for the 2011 UK Open where he reached the last 32. He defeated Mark Dudbridge 9–8 in a close affair, before losing to the 1995 BDO World Darts Champion Richie Burnett 9–6.

In March 2014, he reached the last 32 of the UK Open again, this time being beaten 9–3 by Raymond van Barneveld. Later in the month he progressed to the last 16 of a PDC event for the first time as he beat the likes of Dean Winstanley and Dave Chisnall at the first Players Championship, before losing 6–4 to Andy Hamilton. He won through to the same stage of the third event where he was defeated 6–1 by Gary Anderson. Murnan also qualified for the German Darts Masters, but was eliminated 6–2 by Andy Smith in the first round.

In February 2015 at the 2015 German Darts Championship, Murnan beat Michael Barnard 6–5, Ian White 6–4 (averaged 99.72) and Brendan Dolan 6–4 to play in his first PDC quarter-final. He fell 4–0 down to world number one Michael van Gerwen, before closing to 4–3 with a 12 dart leg, but went on to lose 6–4.

In May 2015, at the 10th Players Championship in Crawley, Murnan won his first PDC title and the £10,000 first prize. His run included 6–3 and 6–4 victories over Premier League players Stephen Bunting and Dave Chisnall in the quarter-finals and final, respectively. The win saw him qualify for the World Matchplay for the first time and he trailed Adrian Lewis 7–2 in the opening round. Murnan won four successive legs, but went on to be beaten 10–7 on his televised debut. He was whitewashed 6–0 by Dave Chisnall on his Players Championship Finals debut.

Murnan's title saw him finish the third highest of the non-qualified players on the Pro Tour Order of Merit for the 2016 World Championship. He played 2012 runner-up Andy Hamilton in the first round and, having trailed 2–1 in sets (missing five darts to lead 2–1 himself) and 2–0 down in legs, Murnan managed to pull off a comeback victory to set up a second round match with Alan Norris, which he lost 4–1. He was knocked out in the fourth round of the UK Open 9–8 by Jelle Klaasen. Murnan's first quarter-final of 2016 was at the 11th Players Championship event and he was edged out 6–5 by Joe Cullen. He qualified for the World Series of Darts Finals and again lost 6–5 to Cullen. He was also knocked out in the first round of the Players Championship Finals 6–0 by Jermaine Wattimena.

Mark Webster defeated Murnan 3–0 in the opening round of the 2017 World Championship.

Murnan lost his PDC Tour Card at the end of 2018 despite managing to qualify for the Grand Slam of Darts for the second consecutive year. However, he won it straight back at UK Q-School in January 2019 via the Order of Merit, sealing at least another two years on the ProTour.

During UK Open 2020, he defeated Harald Leitinger and Karel Sedláček, making it again to the fourth round. There he lost 4–10 to Ricky Evans. He did not qualify for any other major tournaments and after losing in the deciding match and deciding leg to Ciaran Teehan during UK Qualification for PDC World Darts Championship 2021 he lost a chance to maintain his Tour card.

Murnan again immediately obtained his Tour card back in UK Q-School 2021. During the season he qualified for 2021 European Championship, making his debut at this major event. In the First round he los 4–6 with Adam Gawlas. At the end of the year, Murnan qualified for 2022 PDC World Darts Championship, returning to this venue for the first time from 2017. He won his First round match against Paul Lim 3–2, but lost in the Second round 2–3 with Nathan Aspinall.

Despite appearing only at 2022 UK Open, where he lost in the Second round, Murnan was able to hold his Tour card after finishing the season in top 64 at 63rd place, without qualifying for the World Championship.

In 2023 he played only at 2023 UK Open, losing in the Third round against Adrian Lewis 0–6. Throughout the year Murnan qualified for only one European Tour event and ended up outside of top 64 at the end of the year 2023, therefore he lost his Tour card. Having succeeded four times previously, Joe Murnan failed to get through Q School 2024 and missed out on a card for only the second season in 13 years.

== World Championship results ==
=== PDC ===
- 2016: Second round (lost to Alan Norris 1–4)
- 2017: First round (lost to Mark Webster 0–3)
- 2022: Second round (lost to Nathan Aspinall 2–3)

== Performance timeline ==
=== BDO ===
Tournament	2010	2011
BDO Ranked televised events
World Masters	4R	2R

=== PDC ===
Tournament	2011	2012	2013	2014	2015	2016	2017	2018	2019	2020	2021	2022	2023
PDC Ranked televised events
World Championship	DNQ					2R	1R	DNQ				2R	DNQ
UK Open	4R	2R	DNQ	4R	3R	4R	DNQ		4R	4R	2R	2R	3R
World Matchplay	DNQ				1R	DNQ							
European Championship	Did not qualify										1R	DNQ	
Grand Slam	DNQ							RR	RR	DNQ			
Players Championship Finals	DNQ				1R	1R	1R	DNQ					
PDC Non-ranked televised events
World Series Finals	NH				DNQ	1R	DNQ						
Career statistics
PDC Year-end ranking	-	117 (Note: Received Tour card through Q School and started the season without ranking points)	103	79	43	37	55	100	111	88	83	63	95

==== European Tour ====
Season	1	2	3	4	5	6	7	8	9	10	11	12	13
2013	Did not qualify			ADO; 1R	GDT; 1R	GDC; DNQ	GDM; 1R	DDM; DNQ					
2014	GDC; DNQ	DDM; DNQ	GDM; 1R	Did not qualify									
2015	GDC; QF	GDT; 1R	Did not qualify					EDM; 1R	EDG; DNQ				
2016	DDM; DNQ	GDM; DNQ	GDT; 3R	EDM; 1R	Did not qualify			EDT; 1R	EDG; 3R	GDC; DNQ			
2017	GDC; DNQ	GDM; 1R	Did not qualify										
2019	Did not qualify											IDO; 3R	GDT; DNQ
2021	HDT; 2R	GDT; 2R											
2022	IDO; DNQ	GDC; 1R	GDG; DNQ	ADO; DNQ	EDO; DNQ	CDO; DNQ	EDG; 3R	DDC; DNQ	EDM; 1R	HDT; DNQ	GDO; 2R	BDO; DNQ	GDT; DNQ
2023	BSD; DNQ	EDO; WD	Did not qualify									HDT; 1R	GDC; DNQ

==== Players Championships ====
Season	1	2	3	4	5	6	7	8	9	10	11	12	13	14	15	16	17	18	19	20	21	22	23	24	25	26	27	28	29	30
2012	ALI; 1R	ALI; 1R	REA; 1R	REA; 2R	CRA; 2R	CRA; 4R	BIR; 1R	BIR; 1R	CRA; 1R	CRA; 1R	BAR; 2R	BAR; 1R	DUB; 1R	DUB; 2R	KIL; 2R	KIL; 1R	CRA; 1R	CRA; 1R	BAR; 1R	BAR; 1R										
2013	WIG; 1R	WIG; 1R	WIG; 1R	WIG; 4R	CRA; 1R	CRA; 4R	BAR; 2R	BAR; 2R	DUB; 1R	DUB; 2R	KIL; 1R	KIL; PR	WIG; 1R	WIG; 1R	BAR; 1R	BAR; 2R														
2014	BAR; 4R	BAR; 3R	CRA; 4R	CRA; 2R	WIG; 1R	WIG; 1R	WIG; 2R	WIG; 1R	CRA; 2R	CRA; 1R	COV; 3R	COV; 1R	CRA; 2R	CRA; 1R	DUB; 1R	DUB; 2R	CRA; 1R	CRA; 2R	COV; 1R	COV; 1R										
2015 (Note: Not a Tour card holder)	BAR; 4R	BAR; 2R	BAR; 1R	BAR; 1R	BAR; 1R	COV; 1R	COV; 1R	COV; 2R	CRA; 1R	CRA; W	BAR; 3R	BAR; 3R	WIG; 4R	WIG; 1R	BAR; 1R	BAR; 2R	DUB; 3R	DUB; 1R	COV; 4R	COV; 1R										
2016	BAR; 4R	BAR; 3R	BAR; 1R	BAR; 1R	BAR; 2R	BAR; 3R	BAR; 2R	COV; 1R	COV; 3R	BAR; 3R	BAR; QF	BAR; 2R	BAR; 2R	BAR; 3R	BAR; 3R	BAR; 3R	DUB; 2R	DUB; 3R	BAR; 2R	BAR; 2R										
2017	BAR; 3R	BAR; 2R	BAR; 1R	BAR; 1R	MIL; 2R	MIL; 1R	BAR; 1R	BAR; 1R	WIG; 4R	WIG; 1R	MIL; 2R	MIL; 2R	WIG; 2R	WIG; 3R	BAR; 3R	BAR; 2R	BAR; 1R	BAR; 1R	DUB; 1R	DUB; 3R	BAR; 2R	BAR; 3R								
2018	BAR; 1R	BAR; 1R	BAR; 2R	BAR; 1R	MIL; 1R	MIL; 2R	BAR; 1R	BAR; 1R	WIG; 2R	WIG; 3R	MIL; 1R	MIL; 1R	WIG; 1R	WIG; 1R	BAR; 1R	BAR; 1R	BAR; 1R	BAR; 1R	DUB; 2R	DUB; 1R	BAR; 2R	BAR; 1R								
2019	WIG; 1R	WIG; 2R	WIG; 1R	WIG; 2R	BAR; 1R	BAR; 1R	WIG; 2R	WIG; 2R	BAR; 2R	BAR; 3R	BAR; 2R	BAR; 3R	BAR; 1R	BAR; 1R	BAR; 1R	BAR; 1R	WIG; 1R	WIG; 2R	BAR; 1R	BAR; 1R	HIL; 2R	HIL; 2R	BAR; 1R	BAR; 2R	BAR; 2R	BAR; 1R	DUB; 2R	DUB; 2R	BAR; 4R	BAR; 1R
2020	BAR; 1R	BAR; 1R	WIG; 4R	WIG; 2R	WIG; 2R	WIG; 1R	BAR; 1R	BAR; 3R	MIL; 2R	MIL; 1R	MIL; 1R	MIL; 2R	MIL; 2R	NIE; 1R	NIE; 1R	NIE; 1R	NIE; 2R	NIE; 1R	COV; 1R	COV; 1R	COV; 1R	COV; 3R	COV; 2R							
2021	BOL; 1R	BOL; 1R	BOL; 2R	BOL; 1R	MIL; 1R	MIL; 2R	MIL; 3R	MIL; 2R	NIE; 2R	NIE; 1R	NIE; 1R	NIE; 2R	MIL; 1R	MIL; 2R	MIL; 2R	MIL; 1R	COV; 2R	COV; 2R	COV; 2R	COV; 1R	BAR; 2R	BAR; 4R	BAR; 2R	BAR; 1R	BAR; 2R	BAR; 1R	BAR; 2R	BAR; 1R	BAR; 1R	BAR; 2R
2022	BAR; 1R	BAR; 1R	WIG; QF	WIG; 2R	BAR; 1R	BAR; 2R	NIE; 2R	NIE; 1R	BAR; 2R	BAR; 1R	BAR; 2R	BAR; 1R	BAR; 1R	WIG; 2R	WIG; 1R	NIE; 1R	NIE; 3R	BAR; 2R	BAR; 1R	BAR; 1R	BAR; 3R	BAR; 1R	BAR; 2R	BAR; 1R	BAR; 1R	BAR; 2R	BAR; 4R	BAR; 2R	BAR; 1R	BAR; 1R
2023	BAR; 1R	BAR; 1R	BAR; 1R	BAR; 2R	BAR; 1R	BAR; 2R	HIL; DNP	HIL; DNP	WIG; 1R	WIG; 1R	LEI; QF	LEI; 1R	HIL; 2R	HIL; 3R	LEI; 1R	LEI; 1R	HIL; 2R	HIL; 1R	BAR; 1R	BAR; 1R	BAR; DNP	BAR; 1R	BAR; 1R	BAR; 1R	BAR; 1R	BAR; 1R	BAR; 1R	BAR; 1R	BAR; 1R	BAR; 1R

Performance Table Legend
W	Won the tournament	F	Finalist	SF	Semifinalist	QF	Quarterfinalist	#R; RR; Prel.	Lost in # round Round-robin; Preliminary round	DQ	Disqualified
DNQ	Did not qualify	DNP	Did not participate	WD	Withdrew	NH	Tournament not held	#R; RR; Prel.	Lost in # round Round-robin; Preliminary round	NYF	Not yet founded
