= Harry Robinson (darts player) =

English professional darts player

Personal information
- Born: 27 December 1969 (age 56)
- Home town: Alston, Cumbria, England

Sport
- Sport: Darts
- Laterality: Right
- Walk-on music: "Tubthumping" by Chumbawamba

Organisation (see split in darts)
- BDO: 1990–1997, 2012
- PDC: 1997–1999, 2009–2012, 2016–2020

PDC premier events – best performances
- World Championship: Quarter-final: 1998
- World Matchplay: Last 32: 1997, 1998
- UK Open: Last 128: 2009

Other achievements
- PDC Tour Card, 2016–2017

Harry Robinson (born 27 December 1969) is an English former professional darts player who competed in both British Darts Organisation (BDO) and PDC events.

== Career ==
Originally from Newcastle, Robinson began his career as a Northumberland junior county player, playing in the full side at the age of 15 for four years. A move to mainland Europe at the age of 20 saw him pick up some good results, particularly in 1990, where he reached the final of the German Open and the semi-finals of the Belgian Open. A break from darts followed due to a move back to Cumbria, where he played rugby union in the local area.

Robinson would make his first televised appearance for the PDC in 1997, appearing in that year's World Matchplay, where he lost in the first round to Mick Manning. Despite that defeat, his floor results and an appearance in the PDC World Pairs meant he ranked in the world's top 20, earning him a spot in that year's World Championship.

It was at this tournament that Robinson had his biggest achievement in professional darts, reaching the quarter-finals. He attracted particular attention for a win over the third seed, Alan Warriner, which was noted as the shock of the tournament at the time.

That result pushed him as high as eleventh in the world rankings.

That would, however, prove to be the zenith of Robinson's career. He did not qualify for the World Grand Prix in 1998, and his Matchplay run was ended in the first round as Warriner took revenge. Warriner would also avenge the previous year's defeat by dumping Robinson out of the World Championship that year.

He would drift away from darts for a decade after this, only returning in 2009's UK Open, where he was whitewashed 6–0 in the first round. He would play a handful of local tour events until the PDC introduced it's Q School qualifiers in 2011. He would attempt Q School in the first year, but failed to win a Tour Card, only achieving a best result of the last sixteen.

In 2012, he switched darts organisation to attempt qualification for the BDO World Championship, but was defeated in the preliminary round.

A break from darts followed until 2016, when he made a surprise return to the professional tour after obtaining a Tour Card via the Q School Order Of Merit. However, his results remained pedestrian, and he dropped off the main tour at the expiry of his two-year card. He played a handful of Challenge Tour events in 2020, but has remained inactive since.

== World Championship record ==
=== PDC ===
- 1998: Quarter-final (lost to Keith Deller 4–1)
- 1999: Last 16 (lost to Alan Warriner 3–2)

== Performance timeline ==
Tournament	1997	1998	1999	2009
PDC Ranked televised events
World Championship	DNP	QF	2R	DNQ
World Matchplay	1R	1R	DNQ	
UK Open	NH			1R

=== PDC Players Championships ===
Season	1	2	3	4	5	6	7	8	9	10	11	12	13	14	15	16	17	18	19	20	21	22
2016	BAR; 1R	BAR; 1R	BAR; 1R	BAR; 1R	BAR; 1R	BAR; 1R	BAR; 2R	COV; 1R	COV; 2R	BAR; 1R	BAR; 2R	BAR; 2R	BAR; 1R	BAR; DNP			DUB; 1R	DUB; 1R	BAR; 1R	BAR; 1R		
2017	BAR; 1R	BAR; 2R	BAR; 1R	BAR; 1R	MIL; 1R	MIL; 1R	BAR; 2R	BAR; 1R	WIG; 1R	WIG; 1R	MIL; 2R	MIL; 1R	WIG; 3R	WIG; 2R	BAR; 3R	BAR; 1R	BAR; 2R	BAR; 1R	DUB; 1R	DUB; 1R	BAR; 2R	BAR; 1R
