= Benito van de Pas =

Dutch darts player (born 1993)

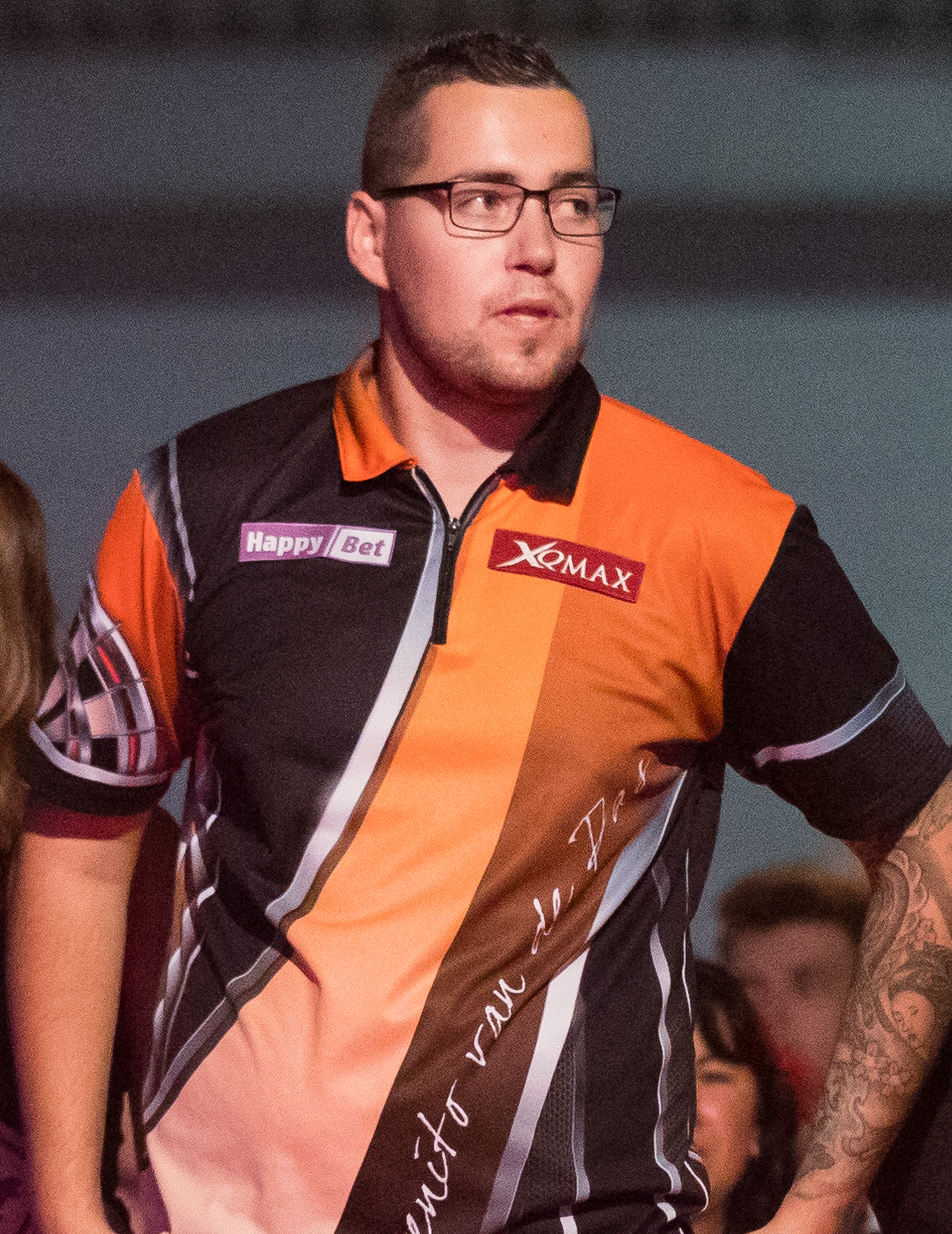
- Van de Pas in 2017

Personal information
- Nickname: "Big Ben"
- Born: 18 January 1993 (age 33) Tilburg, Netherlands

Sport
- Sport: Darts
- Playing since: 2003
- Laterality: Right-handed
- Walk-on music: "I Was Made for Lovin' You" by Kiss

Organisation (see split in darts)
- BDO: 2009–2014
- PDC: 2014–2021 (Tour Card 2014–2020)

WDF major events – best performances
- World Championship: Last 32: 2012, 2013, 2014
- World Masters: Last 16: 2012
- Finder Masters: Quarter-final: 2013

PDC premier events – best performances
- World Championship: Last 16: 2015, 2016, 2017, 2019
- World Matchplay: Last 32: 2015, 2016, 2017
- World Grand Prix: Quarter-final: 2016, 2017
- UK Open: Last 16: 2016
- Grand Slam: Last 16: 2016
- European Championship: Last 16: 2017
- PC Finals: Quarter-final: 2015
- Masters: Last 16: 2017, 2018

Other tournament wins
- Years
Baronie stad Open	2009
Dongen Open	2010
German Open	2011
Hemeco Open Rosmalen	2015
Klaaswaal Open	2011
Modus Super Series Weekly Winner	2026
Open Zeeland	2015
PDC Challenge Tour	2013
PDC Development Tour	2015
Scharen Open	2010
The Hague Championship	2015
Willemstad Open	2010
Players Championships (×3)
2016 (×3)

Other achievements
- 2016 Breaks into the top 16 on the Order of Merit for the first time

Benito van de Pas (born 18 January 1993) is a Dutch professional darts player who formerly competed in Professional Darts Corporation (PDC) events. Van de Pas obtained a PDC Tour Card in 2014 and won three ranking Players Championship events on the 2016 PDC Pro Tour. He is a three-time quarter-finalist in PDC major events, reaching the last eight at the 2015 Players Championship Finals and the World Grand Prix in 2016 and 2017. However, his form declined and he lost his Tour Card at the end of 2020.

== Career ==
=== BDO ===
Van de Pas reached the semi-finals of the 2011 PDC Under-21 World Championship, before losing to Michael van Gerwen 4–1.

Van de Pas won the 2011 German Open. This result helped him to qualify for the 2012 BDO World Darts Championship as the fourteenth seed. He lost in the first round against Alan Norris 3–2. He also qualified for the Lakeside in 2013 and 2014, but lost in the first round again on both occasions.

=== PDC ===
In January 2014, van de Pas entered the PDC Q School, earning a tour card on Day 1 with a 5–4 win over fellow BDO player and compatriot Joey ten Berge in the final round. His first PDC major was the UK Open and he beat Doug Thompson and Davy Dodds both by 5–3 scorelines, before losing 9–3 to Paul Hogan in the third round. Van de Pas reached the last 16 of a PDC event for the first time in May at the eighth Players Championship, but was defeated 6–1 by Simon Whitlock. He won through to the semi-finals in the next event by seeing off the likes of Kevin Painter, Michael Smith and Mervyn King, but then let a 5–2 lead over Justin Pipe turn into a 6–5 defeat. At the Gibraltar Darts Trophy, van de Pas averaged 104.86 in whitewashing Antonio Alcinas 6–0 in the first round and produced another stunning performance to beat world number one Michael van Gerwen 6–5, opening the game with a 10 darter and finishing it with an average of 106.72. In the third round he missed three match darts at double top in the deciding leg against James Wade to be beaten 6–5.

A third quarter-final appearance of the year came at the 14th Players Championship where he lost 6–4 to Michael Smith, but his performances on the Pro Tour throughout the season earned van de Pas a debut in the European Championship and a first round meeting with Peter Wright. Van de Pas trailed 3–0 before fighting back to send the match into a deciding leg during which he missed one dart to progress and was beaten 6–5. Van de Pas was the 29th seed for the Players Championship Finals and he lost to Wright once again in the first round of a PDC major, this time 6–2.

=== 2015 ===
His successful first year in the PDC earned him £19,500 on the Pro Tour Order of Merit which saw him claim the third of 16 spots on offer to non-qualified players for the 2015 World Championship. Van de Pas faced Paul Nicholson in the opening round and made a dream start by throwing a 180 in his first visit and went on to take the first set without reply. The match would go into a deciding set in which van de Pas won all three legs, sealing it with a 109 finish. He continued his progress by twice coming from behind against world number eight Dave Chisnall to defeat him 4–2. However, van de Pas' run came to an end in the third round as Robert Thornton whitewashed him 4–0. After his first year in the PDC he was ranked world number 42, the second highest of all the new players on tour. During the fifth Players Championship event, van de Pas threw his first nine-dart finish on the PDC tour and went on to lose in the last 16.

Van de Pas ended world number one Michael van Gerwen's 21-game unbeaten start to the year in the European Tour events at the International Darts Open. He took out finishes of 158 and 122 to win 6–4 and then defeated Justin Pipe 6–4 and Kim Huybrechts 6–3 to reach his first PDC final. However, he was unable to replicate his performances against Michael Smith as he averaged 81.41 in a 6–3 loss. Van de Pas was also competing on the PDC Development Tour this year and lost in three finals as well as taking the sixth event with a 4–2 win over Bradley Kirk. He qualified for the World Matchplay for the first time and was beaten 10–4 by van Gerwen in the opening round. Van de Pas also made his debut at the World Grand Prix and took the first set against Kim Huybrechts, but then lost six successive legs to be knocked out 2–1 in sets. Van de Pas reached his second final of the year at the 19th Players Championship, with all 11 legs against Peter Wright going with the throw as he was edged out 6–5, missing the bull for the title in the final leg. He saw off Stephen Bunting 6–4 at the Players Championship Finals and then averaged 105.39 and took out two thirds of his shots at doubles in a second round 10–3 thrashing of James Wade and afterwards stated his delight that his floor form was translating on to the televised stage. In van de Pas' first career PDC major quarter-final he was beaten 10–5 by Daryl Gurney.

=== 2016 ===
Wins over Max Hopp and Dimitri van den Bergh saw van de Pas play in the third round of the World Championship for the second successive year and, just like last year, he was unable to pick up a set in a 4–0 defeat this time to Michael Smith. At the UK Open, van de Pas began with victories over Mervyn King and Simon Whitlock before losing to Kyle Anderson 9–2 in the fifth round.

In April, van de Pas lost 6–3 in the final of the third Players Championship to Michael van Gerwen, but exacted revenge 24 hours later as he won his first PDC Pro Tour title by coming back from 5–2 down to defeat van Gerwen 6–5 in the final of the fourth event. He took the ninth event too as he averaged 111 in whitewashing Joe Cullen 6–0. Van de Pas lost 10–7 in the opening round of the World Matchplay to Dave Chisnall. At the World Grand Prix he overcame Gerwyn Price 2–0 and Terry Jenkins 3–1 to reach the quarter-finals, where he was beaten 3–0 by Raymond van Barneveld. Van de Pas claimed his third Players Championship title this year when he saw off Dave Chisnall in the final of the last event. Van de Pas topped his group at the Grand Slam with wins over Chris Dobey, Scott Mitchell and Adrian Lewis, but then lost 10–2 to James Wade in the first knockout round.

=== 2017 ===
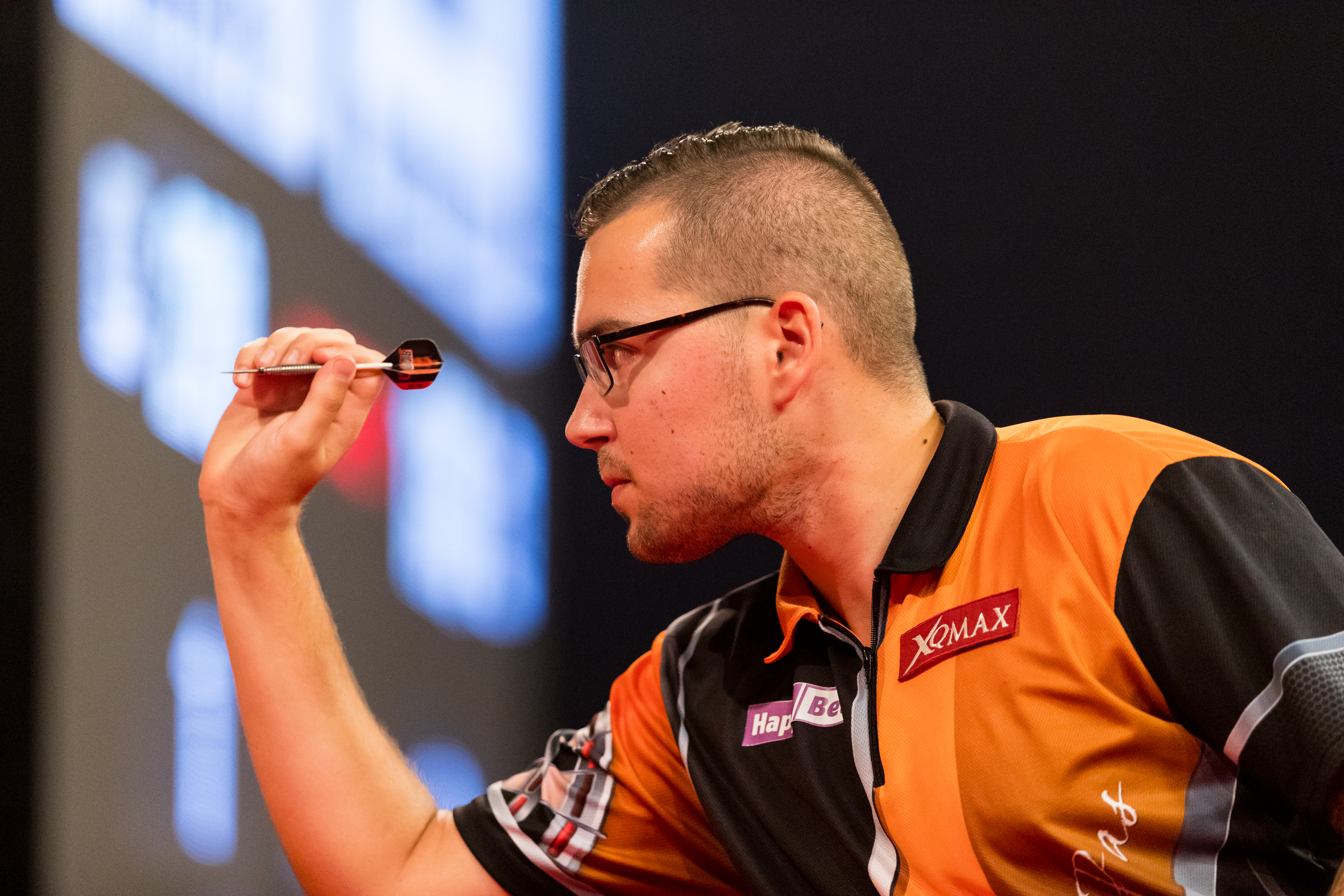
Van de Pas at the 2017 German Darts Grand Prix

Van de Pas saw his 3–1 lead over Terry Jenkins lost in the first round of the 2017 World Championship as he pulled it back to 3–3. Jenkins missed one match dart in the deciding set and van de Pas was able to edge through 4–3. Gary Anderson missed one dart to eliminate van de Pas 4–0 in the third round. Van de Pas won that set then made it 3–2 without dropping a leg, but he lost the next set to be defeated 4–2. He progressed through to the final of the German Darts Open and sent the match into a deciding leg after being 3–1 and 5–3 behind. Van de Pas missed double seven for the title and Peter Wright finished 121 to win 6–5.

=== 2019 ===
Van de Pas beat Jim Long and Toni Alcinas to reach the 4th round of the World Championship. Van de Pas then lost 4–1 to Brendan Dolan.

== World Championship results ==
=== BDO World Championship ===
- 2012: First round (lost to Alan Norris 2–3)
- 2013: First round (lost to Darryl Fitton 2–3)
- 2014: First round (lost to Jan Dekker 0–3)

=== PDC World Championship ===
- 2015: Third round (lost to Robert Thornton 0–4)
- 2016: Third round (lost to Michael Smith 0–4)
- 2017: Third round (lost to Gary Anderson 2–4)
- 2018: First round (lost to Steve West 1–3)
- 2019: Fourth round (lost to Brendan Dolan 1–4)
- 2020: Second round (lost to Max Hopp 2–3)

== Performance timeline ==
=== BDO ===
Tournament	2011	2012	2013	2014
BDO Ranked televised events
World Championship	DNQ	1R	1R	1R
World Masters	1R	6R	5R	PDC
Finder Masters	RR	RR	QF	PDC

PDC

Tournament	2011	2014	2015	2016	2017	2018	2019	2020
PDC Ranked televised events
World Championship	DNP		3R	3R	3R	1R	4R	2R
UK Open	DNQ	3R	3R	5R	4R	2R	4R	3R
World Matchplay	DNQ		1R	1R	1R	DNQ		
World Grand Prix	DNQ		1R	QF	QF	DNQ		
European Championship	DNQ	1R	1R	1R	2R	DNQ		
Grand Slam	DNQ			2R	DNQ			
Players Championship Finals	DNQ	1R	QF	1R	1R	1R	DNQ	
PDC Non-ranked televised events
Masters	Did not qualify				1R	1R	DNQ	
World Youth Championship	SF	1R	3R	WD	1R	DNP		

==== Players Championships ====
Season	1	2	3	4	5	6	7	8	9	10	11	12	13	14	15	16	17	18	19	20	21	22	23	24	25	26	27	28	29	30
2016	BAR; 3R	BAR; 3R	BAR; F	BAR; W	BAR; 1R	BAR; 1R	BAR; SF	COV; 1R	COV; W	BAR; QF	BAR; 3R	BAR; 1R	BAR; F	BAR; 3R	BAR; 1R	BAR; 2R	DUB; 2R	DUB; 3R	BAR; 1R	BAR; W										
2017	BAR; 2R	BAR; 4R	BAR; 3R	BAR; QF	MIL; 1R	MIL; 1R	BAR; QF	BAR; 2R	WIG; 1R	WIG; 4R	MIL; 2R	MIL; 3R	WIG; 1R	WIG; 1R	BAR; 1R	BAR; 4R	BAR; 1R	BAR; 1R	DUB; 1R	DUB; 3R	BAR; 1R	BAR; 3R								
2018	BAR; 4R	BAR; 2R	BAR; 3R	BAR; 1R	MIL; 1R	MIL; 2R	BAR; 2R	BAR; 2R	WIG; 1R	WIG; 1R	MIL; 4R	MIL; 2R	WIG; 2R	WIG; 2R	BAR; 2R	BAR; 2R	BAR; 1R	BAR; 1R	DUB; 2R	DUB; 1R	BAR; 2R	BAR; 1R								
2019	WIG; 1R	WIG; 1R	WIG; 1R	WIG; 2R	BAR; 1R	BAR; 4R	WIG; 1R	WIG; 3R	BAR; 1R	BAR; 2R	BAR; 1R	BAR; 1R	BAR; 1R	BAR; 1R	BAR; 1R	BAR; 2R	WIG; 1R	WIG; 1R	BAR; 3R	BAR; 2R	HIL; 1R	HIL; 2R	BAR; 1R	BAR; 4R	BAR; 1R	BAR; 1R	DUB; 1R	DUB; 1R	BAR; 1R	BAR; 1R
2020	BAR; 1R	BAR; 1R	WIG; 2R	WIG; 1R	WIG; 4R	WIG; 2R	BAR; 2R	BAR; 2R	MIL; 3R	MIL; 3R	MIL; 2R	MIL; 3R	MIL; 1R	NIE; 2R	NIE; 1R	NIE; 1R	NIE; 1R	NIE; 1R	COV; 1R	COV; 1R	COV; 1R	COV; 3R	COV; 1R							
2021 (Note: Not a Tour card holder)	Did not participate								NIE; 1R	NIE; 2R	NIE; 2R	NIE; 3R	Did not participate																	

Key

Performance Table Legend
W	Won the tournament	F	Finalist	SF	Semifinalist	QF	Quarterfinalist	#R; RR; Prel.	Lost in # round Round-robin; Preliminary round	DQ	Disqualified
DNQ	Did not qualify	DNP	Did not participate	WD	Withdrew	NH	Tournament not held	#R; RR; Prel.	Lost in # round Round-robin; Preliminary round	NYF	Not yet founded
