= 2014 Players Championship Finals =

2014 Cash Converters Players Championship Finals

Tournament information
- Dates: 28–30 November 2014
- Venue: Butlin's Minehead
- Location: Minehead, England
- Organisation(s): Professional Darts Corporation (PDC)
- Format: Legs
- Prize fund: £300,000
- Winner's share: £65,000
- High checkout: 170 Michael Smith

Champion(s)
- Gary Anderson (SCO)

The 2014 Cash Converters Players Championship Finals was the seventh edition of the PDC darts tournament, the Players Championship Finals, which saw the top 32 players from the 2014 PDC Pro Tour Order of Merit taking part. The tournament took place at Butlin's Minehead in Minehead, England, between 28 and 30 November 2014.

Michael van Gerwen was the defending champion, having won his third PDC major title by defeating Phil Taylor 11–7 in the 2013 final, but he lost in the second round to Terry Jenkins.

Gary Anderson won his second major PDC title after beating Adrian Lewis 11–6 in the final.

== Qualification ==
The top 32 players of the PDC Pro Tour Order of Merit qualified for this event.

1. (Scotland) Gary Anderson (champion)
2. (Netherlands) Michael van Gerwen (second round)
3. (England) Michael Smith (first round)
4. (Scotland) Peter Wright (second round)
5. (England) James Wade (first round)
6. (Scotland) Robert Thornton (second round)
7. (Northern Ireland) Brendan Dolan (second round)
8. (England) Mervyn King (second round)
9. (England) Phil Taylor (quarter-finals)
10. (England) Justin Pipe (first round)
11. (England) Ian White (first round)
12. (Australia) Simon Whitlock (first round)
13. (Netherlands) Vincent van der Voort (semi-finals)
14. (England) Adrian Lewis (runner-up)
15. (Belgium) Kim Huybrechts (first round)
16. (England) Stephen Bunting (second round)
17. (England) Terry Jenkins (quarter-finals)
18. (England) Steve Beaton (first round)
19. (England) Dave Chisnall (first round)
20. (England) Andy Hamilton (first round)
21. (England) Dean Winstanley (quarter-finals)
22. (England) Jamie Caven (quarter-finals)
23. (England) Wes Newton (semi-finals)
24. (England) Ronnie Baxter (first round)
25. (England) Andrew Gilding (first round)
26. (England) Kevin Painter (first round)
27. (England) Darren Webster (first round)
28. (Netherlands) Jelle Klaasen (second round)
29. (Netherlands) Benito van de Pas (first round)
30. (England) Andy Smith (second round)
31. (Netherlands) Raymond van Barneveld (first round)
32. (Netherlands) Christian Kist (first round)

== Prize money ==
Position (no. of players)		Prize money (Total: £300,000)
Winner	(1)	£65,000
Runner-Up	(1)	£35,000
Semi-finalists	(2)	£17,000
Quarter-finalists	(4)	£11,500
Last 16 (second round)	(8)	£7,000
Last 32 (first round)	(16)	£4,000

== Draw ==
First round (best of 11 legs); 28 November
1	(Scotland) Gary Anderson 110.62	6
32	(Netherlands) Christian Kist 100.40	5
16	(England) Stephen Bunting 91.46	6
17	(England) Steve Beaton 90.98	3
8	(England) Mervyn King 93.95	6
25	(England) Andrew Gilding 98.42	3
9	(England) Phil Taylor 107.97	6
24	(England) Ronnie Baxter 86.83	2
5	(England) James Wade 102.95	4
28	(Netherlands) Jelle Klaasen 108.74	6
12	(Australia) Simon Whitlock 101.38	3
21	(England) Dean Winstanley 103.94	6
4	(Scotland) Peter Wright 84.49	6
29	(Netherlands) Benito van de Pas 80.45	2
13	(Netherlands) Vincent van der Voort 104.86	6
20	(England) Andy Hamilton 72.50	0
2	(Netherlands) Michael van Gerwen 105.80	6
31	(Netherlands) Raymond van Barneveld 85.31	2
15	(Belgium) Kim Huybrechts 94.54	3
18	(England) Terry Jenkins 100.89	6
7	(Northern Ireland) Brendan Dolan 91.82	6
26	(England) Kevin Painter 95.61	5
10	(England) Justin Pipe 86.94	1
23	(England) Wes Newton 102.78	6
6	(Scotland) Robert Thornton 95.68	6
27	(England) Darren Webster 93.19	5
11	(England) Ian White 94.01	4
22	(England) Jamie Caven 94.27	6
3	(England) Michael Smith 94.53	4
30	(England) Andy Smith 95.50	6
14	(England) Adrian Lewis 105.03	6
19	(England) Dave Chisnall 93.73	2

Second round (best of 19 legs); 29 November
1	(Scotland) Gary Anderson 102.98	10
16	(England) Stephen Bunting 95.97	5
8	(England) Mervyn King 97.98	7
9	(England) Phil Taylor 103.06	10
28	(Netherlands) Jelle Klaasen 89.48	5
21	(England) Dean Winstanley 93.97	10
4	(Scotland) Peter Wright 94.21	5
13	(Netherlands) Vincent van der Voort 98.31	10
2	(Netherlands) Michael van Gerwen 95.88	7
18	(England) Terry Jenkins 97.12	10
7	(Northern Ireland) Brendan Dolan 92.37	5
23	(England) Wes Newton 91.08	10
6	(Scotland) Robert Thornton 95.00	9
22	(England) Jamie Caven 91.03	10
30	(England) Andy Smith 92.03	3
14	(England) Adrian Lewis 99.14	10

Quarter-finals (best of 19 legs); 30 November
1	(Scotland) Gary Anderson 105.14	10
9	(England) Phil Taylor 104.58	6
21	(England) Dean Winstanley 89.40	8
13	(Netherlands) Vincent van der Voort 94.48	10
18	(England) Terry Jenkins 86.90	5
23	(England) Wes Newton 94.03	10
22	(England) Jamie Caven 97.89	9
14	(England) Adrian Lewis 100.88	10

Semi-finals (best of 21 legs); 30 November
1	(Scotland) Gary Anderson 103.86	11
13	(Netherlands) Vincent van der Voort 93.35	7
23	(England) Wes Newton 88.95	6
14	(England) Adrian Lewis 95.08	11

Final (best of 21 legs); 30 November
1	(Scotland) Gary Anderson 101.01	11
14	(England) Adrian Lewis 95.37	6
