= 2016 PDC Players Championship series =

The 2016 PDC Players Championship series consisted of 20 darts tournaments on the 2016 PDC Pro Tour. The Players Championship Order of Merit, a ranking list that only includes the prize money from the Players Championship events, determined the field of participants in the 2016 Players Championship Finals. The top 64 on the ranking qualified.

== Prize money ==
The prize money for the Players Championship events were increased from 2015 levels, with each event having a prize fund of £75,000, up 25% from the previous £60,000. This is how the prize money was divided:

Stage (no. of players)		Prize money (Total: £75,000)
Winner	(1)	£10,000
Runner-up	(1)	£6,000
Semi-finalists	(2)	£3,000
Quarter-finalists	(4)	£2,250
Fourth round	(8)	£1,500
Third round	(16)	£1,000
Second round	(32)	£500
First round	(64)	N/A

== Finals ==
2016 PDC Players Championship season
No.	Date	Venue	Winner	Legs	Runner-up	Ref.
1	Saturday 12 March	(England) Barnsley Metrodome	Peter Wright	6 – 5	Adrian Lewis	
2	Sunday 13 March	(England) Barnsley Metrodome	Stephen Bunting	6 – 4	Michael van Gerwen	
3	Friday 8 April	(England) Barnsley Metrodome	Michael van Gerwen	6 – 3	Benito van de Pas	
4	Saturday 9 April	(England) Barnsley Metrodome	Benito van de Pas	6 – 5	Michael van Gerwen	
5	Sunday 10 April	(England) Barnsley Metrodome	Ian White	6 – 0	Michael van Gerwen	
6	Saturday 30 April	(England) Barnsley Metrodome	Josh Payne	6 – 5	James Wade	
7	Sunday 1 May	(England) Barnsley Metrodome	Gerwyn Price	6 – 3	Peter Wright	
8	Saturday 21 May	(England) Coventry Arena	Gerwyn Price	6 – 1	Jamie Caven	
9	Sunday 22 May	(England) Coventry Arena	Benito van de Pas	6 – 0	Joe Cullen	
10	Saturday 2 July	(England) Barnsley Metrodome	Dave Chisnall	6 – 2	Steve Beaton	
11	Sunday 3 July	(England) Barnsley Metrodome	Ian White	6 – 3	Joe Cullen	
12	Saturday 6 August	(England) Barnsley Metrodome	Gary Anderson	6 – 5	Terry Jenkins	
13	Sunday 7 August	(England) Barnsley Metrodome	Ian White	6 – 4	Benito van de Pas	
14	Tuesday 20 September	(England) Barnsley Metrodome	Michael van Gerwen	6 – 0	Mensur Suljović	
15	Wednesday 21 September	(England) Barnsley Metrodome	Michael van Gerwen	6 – 3	James Wilson	
16	Thursday 22 September	(England) Barnsley Metrodome	Michael van Gerwen	6 – 5	Steve West	
17	Friday 30 September	(Republic of Ireland) Citywest Hotel, Dublin	Michael van Gerwen	6 – 1	Christian Kist	
18	Saturday 1 October	(Republic of Ireland) Citywest Hotel, Dublin	Simon Whitlock	6 – 5	Ronny Huybrechts	
19	Friday 21 October	(England) Barnsley Metrodome	Simon Whitlock	6 – 4	Chris Dobey	
20	Saturday 22 October	(England) Barnsley Metrodome	Benito van de Pas	6 – 1	Dave Chisnall	

== March ==
=== Players Championship 1 ===
Players Championship 1 was contested on Saturday 12 March 2016 at the Barnsley Metrodome. The tournament was won by Peter Wright, who defeated Adrian Lewis 6–5 in the final.

Quarter-finals (best of 11 legs)
1	Michael van Gerwen	4
8	Adrian Lewis	6
13	Gary Anderson	6
21	Gerwyn Price	0
2	Peter Wright	6
7	Ian White	3
Joe Cullen	6
22	Daryl Gurney	3

Semi-finals (best of 11 legs)
8	Adrian Lewis	6
13	Gary Anderson	3
2	Peter Wright	6
Joe Cullen	3

Final (best of 11 legs)
8	Adrian Lewis	5
Peter Wright	6

=== Players Championship 2 ===
Players Championship 2 was contested on Sunday 13 March 2016 at the Barnsley Metrodome. Michael van Gerwen hit a nine-dart finish against Ian White. Stephen Bunting won his second PDC ranking title by defeating Michael van Gerwen 6–4 in the final.

Quarter-finals (best of 11 legs)
1	Michael van Gerwen	6
8	Ian White	1
13	Mensur Suljović	3
Kyle Anderson	6
2	Peter Wright	6
Joe Cullen	4
Andrew Gilding	1
22	Stephen Bunting	6

Semi-finals (best of 11 legs)
1	Michael van Gerwen	6
Kyle Anderson	5
2	Peter Wright	5
22	Stephen Bunting	6

Final (best of 11 legs)
1	Michael van Gerwen	4
22	Stephen Bunting	6

== April ==
=== Players Championship 3 ===
Players Championship 3 was contested on Friday 8 April 2016 at the Barnsley Metrodome in Barnsley. Adrian Lewis and Alan Norris hit nine-dart finishes against Ray Campbell and Terry Temple respectively. The tournament was won by Michael van Gerwen, who defeated Benito van de Pas 6–3 in the final.

Quarter-finals (best of 11 legs)
1	Michael van Gerwen	6
25	Mark Webster	0
Robbie Green	6
Jamie Robinson	2
2	Peter Wright	2
10	Benito van de Pas	6
3	Michael Smith	3
22	Alan Norris	6

Semi-finals (best of 11 legs)
1	Michael van Gerwen	6
Robbie Green	1
10	Benito van de Pas	6
22	Alan Norris	3

Final (best of 11 legs)
1	Michael van Gerwen	6
10	Benito van de Pas	3

=== Players Championship 4 ===
Players Championship 4 was contested on Saturday 9 April 2016 at the Barnsley Metrodome. The tournament was won by Benito van de Pas, who defeated Michael van Gerwen 6–5 in the final.

Quarter-finals (best of 11 legs)
1	Michael van Gerwen	6
8	Jelle Klaasen	2
13	Gary Anderson	6
5	Dave Chisnall	3
18	Alan Norris	1
10	Benito van de Pas	6
Max Hopp	2
22	Gerwyn Price	6

Semi-finals (best of 11 legs)
1	Michael van Gerwen	6
13	Gary Anderson	4
10	Benito van de Pas	6
22	Gerwyn Price	2

Final (best of 11 legs)
1	Michael van Gerwen	5
10	Benito van de Pas	6

=== Players Championship 5 ===
Players Championship 5 was contested on Sunday 10 April 2016 at the Barnsley Metrodome. The tournament was won by Ian White, who defeated Michael van Gerwen 6–0 in the final.

Quarter-finals (best of 11 legs)
1	Michael van Gerwen	6
24	Keegan Brown	3
13	Simon Whitlock	3
5	Dave Chisnall	6
Robbie Green	6
Cristo Reyes	5
Josh Payne	3
6	Ian White	6

Semi-finals (best of 11 legs)
1	Michael van Gerwen	6
5	Dave Chisnall	1
Robbie Green	4
6	Ian White	6

Final (best of 11 legs)
1	Michael van Gerwen	0
6	Ian White	6

=== Players Championship 6 ===
Players Championship 6 was contested on Saturday 30 April 2016 at the Barnsley Metrodome. Dave Chisnall hit a nine-dart finish against Jamie Caven. Josh Payne won his maiden PDC ranking title by defeating James Wade 6–5 in the final.

Quarter-finals (best of 11 legs)
1	Peter Wright	5
8	James Wade	6
Nathan Aspinall	5
21	Vincent van der Voort	6
Josh Payne	6
10	Mensur Suljović	5
14	Simon Whitlock	5
Steve Brown	6

Semi-finals (best of 11 legs)
8	James Wade	6
21	Vincent van der Voort	4
Josh Payne	6
Steve Brown	3

Final (best of 11 legs)
8	James Wade	5
Josh Payne	6

== May ==
=== Players Championship 7 ===
Players Championship 7 was contested on Sunday 1 May 2016 at the Barnsley Metrodome. Devon Petersen hit a nine-dart finish against Peter Wright. The tournament was won by Gerwyn Price.

Quarter-finals (best of 11 legs)
1	Peter Wright	6
Christian Kist	1
Wayne Jones	2
5	Dave Chisnall	6
18	Gerwyn Price	6
Ricky Evans	2
Kevin Dowling	1
6	Benito van de Pas	6

Semi-finals (best of 11 legs)
1	Peter Wright	6
5	Dave Chisnall	5
18	Gerwyn Price	6
6	Benito van de Pas	2

Final (best of 11 legs)
1	Peter Wright	3
18	Gerwyn Price	6

=== Players Championship 8 ===
Players Championship 8 was contested on Saturday 21 May 2016 at the Coventry Arena. The tournament was won by Gerwyn Price, who defeated Jamie Caven 6–1 in the final.

Quarter-finals (best of 11 legs)
16	Gerwyn Price	6
9	Mensur Suljović	5
Jonny Clayton	5
Ronnie Baxter	6
Andy Jenkins	0
26	Jamie Caven	6
3	Dave Chisnall	6
22	Mark Webster	2

Semi-finals (best of 11 legs)
16	Gerwyn Price	6
Ronnie Baxter	4
26	Jamie Caven	6
3	Dave Chisnall	4

Final (best of 11 legs)
16	Gerwyn Price	6
26	Jamie Caven	1

=== Players Championship 9 ===
Players Championship 9 was contested on Sunday 22 May 2016 at the Coventry Arena. Jeffrey de Zwaan hit a nine-dart finish against Ron Meulenkamp. The tournament was won by Benito van de Pas, who defeated Joe Cullen 6–0 in the final.

Quarter-finals (best of 11 legs)
1	Peter Wright	3
25	Steve Beaton	6
20	Joe Cullen	6
5	Dave Chisnall	4
18	Justin Pipe	3
7	Benito van de Pas	6
14	Alan Norris	5
Darren Webster	6

Semi-finals (best of 11 legs)
25	Steve Beaton	5
20	Joe Cullen	6
7	Benito van de Pas	6
Darren Webster	1

Final (best of 11 legs)
20	Joe Cullen	0
7	Benito van de Pas	6

== July ==
=== Players Championship 10 ===
Players Championship 10 was contested on Saturday 2 July 2016 at the Barnsley Metrodome. The tournament was won by Dave Chisnall, who defeated Steve Beaton 6–2 in the final.

Quarter-finals (best of 11 legs)
1	Kim Huybrechts	6
9	Gerwyn Price	3
20	Steve Beaton	6
5	Benito van de Pas	4
2	Dave Chisnall	6
23	Kyle Anderson	3
Mark Walsh	1
27	Andrew Gilding	6

Semi-finals (best of 11 legs)
1	Kim Huybrechts	4
20	Steve Beaton	6
2	Dave Chisnall	6
27	Andrew Gilding	0

Final (best of 11 legs)
20	Steve Beaton	2
2	Dave Chisnall	6

=== Players Championship 11 ===
Players Championship 11 was contested on Sunday 3 July 2016 at the Barnsley Metrodome. The tournament was won by Ian White, who defeated Joe Cullen 6–3 in the final.

Quarter-finals (best of 11 legs)
1	Kim Huybrechts	6
25	Robbie Green	5
4	Ian White	6
Ronny Huybrechts	1
15	Joe Cullen	6
Joe Murnan	5
30	Cristo Reyes	6
6	Mensur Suljović	2

Semi-finals (best of 11 legs)
1	Kim Huybrechts	3
4	Ian White	6
15	Joe Cullen	6
30	Cristo Reyes	4

Final (best of 11 legs)
4	Ian White	6
15	Joe Cullen	3

== August ==
=== Players Championship 12 ===
Players Championship 12 was contested on Saturday 6 August 2016 at the Barnsley Metrodome. The tournament was won by Gary Anderson, who defeated Terry Jenkins 6–5 in the final.

Quarter-finals (best of 11 legs)
17	Steve Beaton	3
9	Terry Jenkins	6
Simon Stevenson	4
James Wilson	6
Jonny Clayton	6
7	Gerwyn Price	4
14	Daryl Gurney	3
11	Gary Anderson	6

Semi-finals (best of 11 legs)
9	Terry Jenkins	6
James Wilson	3
Jonny Clayton	0
11	Gary Anderson	6

Final (best of 11 legs)
9	Terry Jenkins	5
11	Gary Anderson	6

=== Players Championship 13 ===
Players Championship 13 was contested on Sunday 7 August 2016 at the Barnsley Metrodome. The tournament was won by Ian White, who defeated Benito van de Pas 6–4 in the final.

Quarter-finals (best of 11 legs)
James Wilson	6
Jason Wilson	1
4	Benito van de Pas	6
12	Alan Norris	5
15	Joe Cullen	6
23	Vincent van der Voort	0
3	Ian White	6
6	Mensur Suljović	5

Semi-finals (best of 11 legs)
James Wilson	3
4	Benito van de Pas	6
15	Joe Cullen	4
3	Ian White	6

Final (best of 11 legs)
4	Benito van de Pas	4
3	Ian White	6

== September ==
=== Players Championship 14 ===
Players Championship 14 was contested on Tuesday 20 September 2016 at the Barnsley Metrodome. The tournament was won by Michael van Gerwen who defeated Mensur Suljović 6–0 in the final.

Quarter-finals (best of 11 legs)
1	Michael van Gerwen	6
24	James Wilson	2
4	Kim Huybrechts	5
John Henderson	6
18	Mervyn King	4
Mick McGowan	6
3	Mensur Suljović	6
27	Justin Pipe	2

Semi-finals (best of 11 legs)
1	Michael van Gerwen	6
John Henderson	4
Mick McGowan	2
3	Mensur Suljović	6

Final (best of 11 legs)
1	Michael van Gerwen	6
3	Mensur Suljović	0

=== Players Championship 15 ===
Players Championship 15 was contested on Wednesday 21 September 2016 at the Barnsley Metrodome. Chris Dobey and Michael van Gerwen hit nine-dart finishes against Jeffrey de Graaf and Simon Whitlock respectively. The tournament was won by Michael van Gerwen who defeated James Wilson 6–3 in the final.

Quarter-finals (best of 11 legs)
1	Michael van Gerwen 104.76	6
24	Robert Thornton 93.10	3
Dimitri Van den Bergh	6
28	Cristo Reyes	3
31	Jermaine Wattimena	6
10	Jelle Klaasen	4
30	Raymond van Barneveld	3
22	James Wilson	6

Semi-finals (best of 11 legs)
1	Michael van Gerwen 107.70	6
Dimitri Van den Bergh 96.36	3
31	Jermaine Wattimena	4
22	James Wilson	6

Final (best of 11 legs)
1	Michael van Gerwen 102.14	6
22	James Wilson 99.17	3

=== Players Championship 16 ===
Players Championship 16 was contested on Thursday 22 September 2016 at the Barnsley Metrodome. Yordi Meeuwisse, Simon Whitlock and Michael van Gerwen hit nine-dart finishes against Benito van de Pas, Andrew Gilding and Joe Murnan respectively. The tournament was won by Michael van Gerwen who defeated Steve West 6–4 in the final.

Quarter-finals (best of 11 legs)
1	Michael van Gerwen	6
Berry van Peer	3
4	Kim Huybrechts	6
Rowby-John Rodriguez	1
31	Steve West	6
23	Cristo Reyes	4
Ricky Evans	6
Chris Dobey	4

Semi-finals (best of 11 legs)
1	Michael van Gerwen	6
4	Kim Huybrechts	1
31	Steve West	6
Ricky Evans	4

Final (best of 11 legs)
1	Michael van Gerwen	6
31	Steve West	5

=== Players Championship 17 ===
Players Championship 17 was contested on Friday 30 September 2016 at the Citywest Hotel in Dublin. The tournament was won by Michael van Gerwen, who defeated Christian Kist, 6–1 in the final, to win his fourth Players Championship title in a row.

Quarter-finals (best of 11 legs)
1	Michael van Gerwen	6
8	James Wade	3
20	Steve Beaton	5
Darren Webster	6
31	Justin Pipe	1
Christian Kist	6
3	Mensur Suljović	6
11	Stephen Bunting	2

Semi-finals (best of 11 legs)
1	Michael van Gerwen	6
Darren Webster	0
Christian Kist	6
3	Mensur Suljović	5

Final (best of 11 legs)
1	Michael van Gerwen	6
Christian Kist	1

== October ==
=== Players Championship 18 ===
Players Championship 18 was contested on Saturday 1 October 2016 at the Citywest Hotel in Dublin. The tournament was won by Simon Whitlock, who defeated Ronny Huybrechts 6–5 in the final.

Quarter-finals (best of 11 legs)
16	Simon Whitlock	6
25	Justin Pipe	1
20	Adrian Lewis	3
28	Steve West	6
18	Daryl Gurney	6
7	Ian White	3
14	Jelle Klaasen	2
Ronny Huybrechts	6

Semi-finals (best of 11 legs)
16	Simon Whitlock	6
28	Steve West	1
18	Daryl Gurney	5
Ronny Huybrechts	6

Final (best of 11 legs)
16	Simon Whitlock	6
Ronny Huybrechts	5

=== Players Championship 19 ===
Players Championship 19 was contested on Friday 21 October 2016 at the Barnsley Metrodome. The tournament was won by Simon Whitlock, who defeated Ronny Huybrechts 6–5 in the final. Whitlcok also hit a nine-dart finish against Pär Riihonen.

Quarter-finals (best of 11 legs)
17	Adrian Lewis	6
Rowby-John Rodriguez	3
29	Chris Dobey	6
12	Stephen Bunting	3
31	Josh Payne	3
Mark Frost	6
Jamie Lewis	5
11	Simon Whitlock	6

Semi-finals (best of 11 legs)
17	Adrian Lewis	5
29	Chris Dobey	6
Mark Frost	3
11	Simon Whitlock	6

Final (best of 11 legs)
29	Chris Dobey	4
11	Simon Whitlock	6

=== Players Championship 20 ===
Players Championship 20 was contested on Saturday 22 October 2016 at the Barnsley Metrodome. Benito van de Pas won his third Players Championship title of the year by defeating Dave Chisnall 6–1 in the final.

Quarter-finals (best of 11 legs)
17	Daryl Gurney	6
Christian Kist	3
4	Dave Chisnall	6
21	James Wilson	2
2	Peter Wright 94.31	5
26	Justin Pipe 89.35	6
3	Benito van de Pas 93.52	6
Matthew Edgar 88.30	2

Semi-finals (best of 11 legs)
17	Daryl Gurney	4
4	Dave Chisnall	6
26	Justin Pipe 92.05	5
3	Benito van de Pas 88.01	6

Final (best of 11 legs)
4	Dave Chisnall 75.67	1
3	Benito van de Pas 79.23	6

== Players Championship Order of Merit ==
The Top 64 on the Players Championship Order of Merit qualified for the 2016 Players Championship Finals. On 21 November, it was announced that the Kyle Anderson withdrew due to problems with his visa. Andy Hamilton took his place in the field.

Rank	Player	Prize money
1	Michael van Gerwen	£71,750
2	Benito van de Pas	£53,250
3	Ian White	£42,250
4	Simon Whitlock	£38,500
5	Gerwyn Price	£37,750
6	Dave Chisnall	£37,000
7	Peter Wright	£36,000
8	Mensur Suljović	£34,750
9	Joe Cullen	£30,250
10	Stephen Bunting	£26,500
11	James Wilson	£24,000
12	Steve West	£22,500
13	Chris Dobey	£21,750
14	Steve Beaton	£21,500
15	Kim Huybrechts	£21,250
16	Josh Payne	£21,000
17	Cristo Reyes	£20,750
18	Daryl Gurney	£19,500
19	Robbie Green	£19,250
20	Alan Norris	£19,250
21	Justin Pipe	£18,500
22	Jelle Klaasen	£18,250
23	Kyle Anderson	£18,250
24	Gary Anderson	£18,000
25	Ronny Huybrechts	£16,750
26	Adrian Lewis	£16,750
27	James Wade	£16,250
28	Jamie Caven	£16,000
29	Christian Kist	£15,500
30	Darren Webster	£15,500
31	Mark Webster	£15,500
32	Joe Murnan	£15,250

Rank	Player	Prize money
33	Vincent van der Voort	£15,250
34	Andrew Gilding	£15,250
35	Jermaine Wattimena	£15,000
36	Terry Jenkins	£15,000
37	Jonny Clayton	£14,250
38	Ricky Evans	£14,250
39	Jamie Lewis	£13,250
40	Mervyn King	£13,250
41	Robert Thornton	£12,750
42	Rowby-John Rodriguez	£12,500
43	John Henderson	£12,000
44	Simon Stevenson	£11,750
45	Andy Jenkins	£11,750
46	Michael Smith	£11,750
47	Devon Petersen	£11,500
48	Ronnie Baxter	£11,000
49	Berry van Peer	£10,750
50	Mark Walsh	£10,750
51	Mickey Mansell	£10,500
52	Jeffrey de Graaf	£10,000
53	Mick McGowan	£10,000
54	Jan Dekker	£9,500
55	Vincent Kamphuis	£9,000
56	Ron Meulenkamp	£9,000
57	Steve Brown	£9,000
58	Raymond van Barneveld	£8,750
59	Jason Wilson	£8,750
60	Kevin Painter	£8,500
61	Dimitri Van den Bergh	£8,500
62	Matthew Edgar	£8,250
63	Keegan Brown	£8,250
64	Brendan Dolan	£8,000
65	Andy Hamilton	£8,000
