= 2016 World Grand Prix (darts) =

2016 Unibet World Grand Prix

Tournament information
- Dates: 2–8 October 2016
- Venue: Citywest Hotel
- Location: Dublin, Ireland
- Organisation(s): Professional Darts Corporation (PDC)
- Format: Sets "double in, double out"
- Prize fund: £400,000
- Winner's share: £100,000
- High checkout: 164 Raymond van Barneveld

Champion(s)
- Michael van Gerwen (NED)

The 2016 Unibet World Grand Prix was the 19th staging of the World Grand Prix. It was played from 2 to 8 October 2016 at the Citywest Hotel in Dublin, Ireland.

Robert Thornton was the defending champion after beating Michael van Gerwen 5–4 in sets in the last year's final, but he lost in the first round to Stephen Bunting.

Michael van Gerwen won his third Grand Prix title after defeating Gary Anderson 5–2 in the final.

== Prize money ==
The total prize money remained at £400,000. The following is the breakdown of the fund:

Position (num. of players)		Prize money (Total: £400,000)
Winner	(1)	£100,000
Runner-Up	(1)	£45,000
Semi-finalists	(2)	£23,500
Quarter-finalists	(4)	£15,000
Second round losers	(8)	£8,500
First round losers	(16)	£5,000

== Qualification ==
The field of 32 players was made up from the top 16 on the PDC Order of Merit on September 25. The remaining 16 places went to the top 14 non-qualified players from the ProTour Order of Merit and then to the top two non-qualified residents of the Republic of Ireland and Northern Ireland from the 2016 ProTour Order of Merit. The top eight players are seeded in the tournament.

The following players are taking part in the tournament:

PDC Order of Merit (1–16)
1. (Netherlands) Michael van Gerwen (winner)
2. (Scotland) Gary Anderson (runner-up)
3. (England) Adrian Lewis (second round)
4. (England) Phil Taylor (first round)
5. (Scotland) Peter Wright (first round)
6. (England) James Wade (first round)
7. (Scotland) Robert Thornton (first round)
8. (England) Michael Smith (first round)
9. (England) Dave Chisnall (semi-finals)
10. (Netherlands) Jelle Klaasen (first round)
11. (England) Ian White (first round)
12. (Belgium) Kim Huybrechts (quarter-finals)
13. (Netherlands) Raymond van Barneveld (semi-finals)
14. (Austria) Mensur Suljović (first round)
15. (England) Stephen Bunting (second round)
16. (England) Terry Jenkins (second round)

Pro Tour
1. (Netherlands) Benito van de Pas (quarter-finals)
2. (Wales) Gerwyn Price (first round)
3. (England) Alan Norris (second round)
4. (England) Joe Cullen (first round)
5. (Australia) Simon Whitlock (quarter-finals)
6. (Northern Ireland) Daryl Gurney (quarter-finals)
7. (England) Steve Beaton (first round)
8. (England) James Wilson (second round)
9. (England) Mervyn King (first round)
10. (Australia) Kyle Anderson (second round)
11. (England) Jamie Caven (first round)
12. (England) Steve West (second round)
13. (Spain) Cristo Reyes (first round)
14. (England) Robbie Green (first round)

Irish Qualifiers
1. (Northern Ireland) Brendan Dolan (second round)
2. (Republic of Ireland) Mick McGowan (first round)

== Draw ==
The draw was made on 25 September during the 2016 Champions League of Darts.

First round (best of 3 sets); 2–3 October
1	(Netherlands) Michael van Gerwen 97.39	2
(England) Steve Beaton 80.98	1
(England) James Wilson 90.12	2
(Republic of Ireland) Mick McGowan 82.51	1
8	(England) Michael Smith 80.01	1
(England) Alan Norris 77.83	2
(England) Joe Cullen 80.28	1
(Australia) Simon Whitlock 82.36	2
5	(Scotland) Peter Wright 87.00	0
(Northern Ireland) Brendan Dolan 92.16	2
(England) Dave Chisnall 84.20	2
(England) Robbie Green 84.88	1
4	(England) Phil Taylor 91.48	1
(England) Steve West 83.24	2
(Austria) Mensur Suljović 80.55	1
(Northern Ireland) Daryl Gurney 75.66	2
2	(Scotland) Gary Anderson 96.92	2
(England) Jamie Caven 85.71	0
(Australia) Kyle Anderson 81.69	2
(Spain) Cristo Reyes 78.59	1
7	(Scotland) Robert Thornton 85.19	1
(England) Stephen Bunting 90.18	2
(England) Ian White 77.72	1
(Belgium) Kim Huybrechts 80.90	2
6	(England) James Wade 87.79	1
(England) Terry Jenkins 91.36	2
(Netherlands) Benito van de Pas 77.33	2
(Wales) Gerwyn Price 72.00	0
3	(England) Adrian Lewis 91.60	2
(Netherlands) Jelle Klaasen 89.42	1
(Netherlands) Raymond van Barneveld 84.24	2
(England) Mervyn King 88.94	0

Second round (best of 5 sets); 4–5 October
1	(Netherlands) Michael van Gerwen 97.17	3
(England) James Wilson 84.02	0
(England) Alan Norris 88.47	2
(Australia) Simon Whitlock 89.44	3
(Northern Ireland) Brendan Dolan 87.06	1
(England) Dave Chisnall 94.33	3
(England) Steve West 86.97	0
(Northern Ireland) Daryl Gurney 86.12	3
2	(Scotland) Gary Anderson 96.88	3
(Australia) Kyle Anderson 84.88	1
(England) Stephen Bunting 87.30	0
(Belgium) Kim Huybrechts 98.47	3
(England) Terry Jenkins 86.25	1
(Netherlands) Benito van de Pas 84.76	3
3	(England) Adrian Lewis 85.30	0
(Netherlands) Raymond van Barneveld 97.90	3

Quarter-finals (best of 5 sets); 6 October
1	(Netherlands) Michael van Gerwen 103.09	3
(Australia) Simon Whitlock 92.69	1
(England) Dave Chisnall 90.54	3
(Northern Ireland) Daryl Gurney 86.52	1
2	(Scotland) Gary Anderson 83.03	3
(Belgium) Kim Huybrechts 85.71	1
(Netherlands) Benito van de Pas 88.02	0
(Netherlands) Raymond van Barneveld 93.36	3

Semi-finals (best of 7 sets); 7 October
1	(Netherlands) Michael van Gerwen 99.37	4
(England) Dave Chisnall 95.05	2
2	(Scotland) Gary Anderson 98.89	4
(Netherlands) Raymond van Barneveld 91.55	1

Final (best of 9 sets); 8 October
1	(Netherlands) Michael van Gerwen 100.29	5
2	(Scotland) Gary Anderson 92.73	2
