= 2015 Players Championship Finals =

2015 Cash Converters Players Championship Finals

Tournament information
- Dates: 27–29 November 2015
- Venue: Butlin's Minehead
- Location: Minehead, England
- Organisation(s): Professional Darts Corporation (PDC)
- Format: Legs
- Prize fund: £300,000
- Winner's share: £65,000
- High checkout: 170 Michael van Gerwen

Champion(s)
- (Netherlands) Michael van Gerwen

The 2015 Players Championship Finals (known for sponsorship reasons as the 2015 Cash Converters Players Championship Finals) was the seventh edition of the PDC darts tournament, the Players Championship Finals, which saw the top 32 players from the 2015 PDC Pro Tour Order of Merit took part. The tournament took place at Butlin's Minehead in Minehead, England, between 27 and 29 November 2015.

The defending champion Gary Anderson lost to Daryl Gurney 10–4 in the second round.

Michael van Gerwen won his 13th PDC major title by beating Adrian Lewis 11–6 in the final.

== Prize money ==
Position (no. of players)		Prize money (Total: £300,000)
Winner	(1)	£65,000
Runner-Up	(1)	£35,000
Semi-finalists	(2)	£17,000
Quarter-finalists	(4)	£11,500
Last 16 (second round)	(8)	£7,000
Last 32 (first round)	(16)	£4,000

== Qualification ==
The top 32 players of the PDC Pro Tour Order of Merit qualified for this event.

1. (Netherlands) Michael van Gerwen (champion)
2. (England) Michael Smith (second round)
3. (Scotland) Peter Wright (second round)
4. (England) James Wade (second round)
5. (Belgium) Kim Huybrechts (first round)
6. (England) Adrian Lewis (runner-up)
7. (England) Ian White (quarter-finals)
8. (England) Dave Chisnall (quarter-finals)
9. (Scotland) Robert Thornton (first round)
10. (Netherlands) Jelle Klaasen (first round)
11. (England) Terry Jenkins (first round)
12. (Scotland) Gary Anderson (second round)
13. (Netherlands) Benito van de Pas (quarter-finals)
14. (Northern Ireland) Brendan Dolan (first round)
15. (Austria) Mensur Suljović (semi-finals)
16. (England) Justin Pipe (first round)
17. (Netherlands) Vincent van der Voort (second round)
18. (England) Mervyn King (first round)
19. (Australia) Simon Whitlock (quarter-finals)
20. (England) Stephen Bunting (first round)
21. (England) Phil Taylor (first round)
22. (England) Alan Norris (second round)
23. (Wales) Gerwyn Price (second round)
24. (Wales) Jamie Lewis (second round)
25. (England) Joe Murnan (first round)
26. (Netherlands) Raymond van Barneveld (first round)
27. (Scotland) John Henderson (first round)
28. (Northern Ireland) Daryl Gurney (semi-finals)
29. (Wales) Mark Webster (first round)
30. (England) Steve Beaton (first round)
31. (England) Jamie Caven (first round)
32. (England) Keegan Brown (first round)

== Draw ==
There was no draw held, but all players were put in a fixed bracket by their seeding positions.

First round (best of 11 legs); 27 November
1	(Netherlands) Michael van Gerwen 98.24	6
32	(England) Keegan Brown 96.89	4
16	(England) Justin Pipe 90.31	1
17	(Netherlands) Vincent van der Voort 92.26	6
8	(England) Dave Chisnall 96.97	6
25	(England) Joe Murnan 82.90	0
9	(Scotland) Robert Thornton 92.91	5
24	(Wales) Jamie Lewis 95.63	6
5	(Belgium) Kim Huybrechts 96.76	2
28	(Northern Ireland) Daryl Gurney 101.38	6
12	(Scotland) Gary Anderson 96.60	6
21	(England) Phil Taylor 94.22	5
4	(England) James Wade 95.16	6
29	(Wales) Mark Webster 85.86	3
13	(Netherlands) Benito van de Pas 88.64	6
20	(England) Stephen Bunting 89.56	4
2	(England) Michael Smith 91.04	6
31	(England) Jamie Caven 90.82	3
15	(Austria) Mensur Suljović 95.97	6
18	(England) Mervyn King 84.59	1
7	(England) Ian White 89.17	6
26	(Netherlands) Raymond van Barneveld 90.09	5
10	(Netherlands) Jelle Klaasen 91.76	4
23	(Wales) Gerwyn Price 97.95	6
6	(England) Adrian Lewis 93.33	6
27	(Scotland) John Henderson 92.61	3
11	(England) Terry Jenkins 81.54	3
22	(England) Alan Norris 88.46	6
3	(Scotland) Peter Wright 92.74	6
30	(England) Steve Beaton 92.95	2
14	(Northern Ireland) Brendan Dolan 82.99	2
19	(Australia) Simon Whitlock 86.80	6

Second round (best of 19 legs); 28 November
1	(Netherlands) Michael van Gerwen 103.23	10
17	(Netherlands) Vincent van der Voort 86.80	6
8	(England) Dave Chisnall 96.57	10
24	(Wales) Jamie Lewis 97.27	8
28	(Northern Ireland) Daryl Gurney 94.35	10
12	(Scotland) Gary Anderson 86.70	4
4	(England) James Wade 100.18	3
13	(Netherlands) Benito van de Pas 105.39	10
2	(England) Michael Smith 88.42	3
15	(Austria) Mensur Suljović 92.77	10
7	(England) Ian White 97.05	10
23	(Wales) Gerwyn Price 91.69	9
6	(England) Adrian Lewis 99.84	10
22	(England) Alan Norris 96.25	3
3	(Scotland) Peter Wright 102.38	9
19	(Australia) Simon Whitlock 96.59	10

Quarter-finals (best of 19 legs); 29 November
1	(Netherlands) Michael van Gerwen 107.02	10
8	(England) Dave Chisnall 105.51	7
28	(Northern Ireland) Daryl Gurney 94.22	10
13	(Netherlands) Benito van de Pas 89.67	5
15	(Austria) Mensur Suljović 97.55	10
7	(England) Ian White 95.08	6
6	(England) Adrian Lewis 94.50	10
19	(Australia) Simon Whitlock 87.94	7

Semi-finals (best of 21 legs); 29 November
1	(Netherlands) Michael van Gerwen 102.92	11
28	(Northern Ireland) Daryl Gurney 89.43	2
15	(Austria) Mensur Suljović 93.21	1
6	(England) Adrian Lewis 103.31	11

Final (best of 21 legs); 29 November
1	(Netherlands) Michael van Gerwen 100.32	11
6	(England) Adrian Lewis 89.17	6

== Statistics ==
Player	Eliminated	Played	Legs Won	Legs Lost	Throw Breaks	100+	140+	170+	180s	High checkout	Checkout Av.%	Average
(Netherlands) Michael van Gerwen	Winner	5	48	25	3	86	63	2	24	170	37.5	102.57
(Scotland) Gary Anderson	2nd Round	2	10	15	1	26	18	0	6	96	28.57	90.84
(England) Phil Taylor	1st Round	1	5	6	1	16	7	0	3	148	28	94.22
(Scotland) Peter Wright	2nd Round	2	15	12	3	35	25	0	10	112	40.54	99.33
(England) Adrian Lewis	Final	5	43	25	7	90	51	0	18	147	43.88	95.56
(Scotland) Robert Thornton	1st Round	1	5	6	2	8	10	0	3	138	42	92.91
(England) James Wade	2nd Round	2	9	13	4	32	16	0	8	102	31.75	97.67
(England) Michael Smith	2nd Round	2	9	13	3	29	5	0	5	92	31.83	89.73
(England) Ian White	Quarter-finals	3	22	24	1	61	34	0	13	81	29.63	93.77
(England) Terry Jenkins	1st Round	1	3	6	2	8	8	0	2	20	19	81.54
(Belgium) Kim Huybrechts	1st Round	1	2	6	0	8	6	0	2	81	29	96.76
(England) Dave Chisnall	Quarter-finals	3	23	18	7	43	34	1	14	164	41.82	100.13
(Australia) Simon Whitlock	Quarter-finals	3	23	21	2	51	18	0	13	112	41.07	91.28
(England) Mervyn King	1st Round	1	1	6	0	8	5	0	0	25	33	84.59
(Netherlands) Raymond van Barneveld	1st Round	1	5	6	1	16	9	0	2	141	28	90.09
(Netherlands) Vincent van der Voort	2nd Round	2	10	11	4	25	12	1	5	157	42.86	92.16
(England) Stephen Bunting	1st Round	1	4	6	2	14	4	0	4	84	31	89.56
(Northern Ireland) Brendan Dolan	1st Round	1	2	6	0	18	4	0	0	16	10	82.99
(England) Justin Pipe	1st Round	1	1	6	1	13	3	0	2	44	11	90.31
(Netherlands) Jelle Klaasen	1st Round	1	4	6	2	15	3	0	1	112	31	91.76
(Austria) Mensur Suljović	Semi-finals	4	27	21	6	77	30	2	12	139	38.57	94.91
(England) Jamie Caven	1st Round	1	3	6	1	14	3	0	1	20	30	90.82
(England) Steve Beaton	1st Round	1	2	6	1	7	8	0	1	132	18	92.95
(Wales) Mark Webster	1st Round	1	3	6	1	5	6	0	1	93	23	85.86
(Netherlands) Benito van de Pas	Quarter-finals	3	21	17	9	43	17	3	8	100	52.50	94.31
(Wales) Jamie Lewis	2nd Round	2	14	15	6	37	17	1	13	142	36.5	96.45
(Scotland) John Henderson	1st Round	1	3	6	2	15	3	0	2	137	100	92.61
(Wales) Gerwyn Price	2nd Round	2	15	14	3	41	15	0	4	116	38.46	93.84
(England) Keegan Brown	1st Round	1	4	6	2	11	4	0	3	40	36	96.89
(Northern Ireland) Daryl Gurney	Semi-finals	4	28	22	2	60	32	0	15	120	32.56	94.17
(England) Alan Norris	2nd Round	2	9	13	3	25	17	0	6	86	23.04	92.36
(England) Joe Murnan	1st Round	1	0	6	0	12	2	0	0	-	0	82.90
