= Players Championship Finals =

Organised by the Professional Darts Corporation

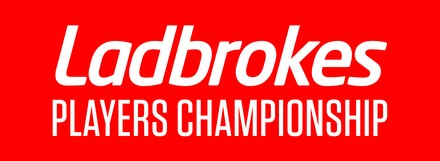

Tournament information
- Venue: Butlins Resort
- Location: Minehead
- Country: England
- Established: 2009
- Organisation(s): Professional Darts Corporation (PDC)
- Format: Legs
- Prize fund: £600,000
- Month(s) Played: November

Current champion(s)
- Luke Littler (ENG)

The Players Championship Finals is a darts tournament organised by the Professional Darts Corporation. The tournament originally featured the top 32 players from the Players Championship Order of Merit, a separate ranking system that only takes into account the non-televised Players Championship events on the PDC Pro Tour. In 2016, the field increased to 64 players. In 2027, it will increase again to 128 players.

The tournament was first announced at the PDC Awards Dinner in January 2008 by PDC chairman Barry Hearn. It was initially held from late January to February, and originally took place at the Circus Tavern in Purfleet, the venue for the first 14 PDC World Championships. For the third edition, the event moved to the Doncaster Dome. The 2012 edition took place in December at Butlins Minehead and has remained at that venue for all subsequent tournaments, with the exception of the 2020 tournament, which was moved to Coventry, due to the COVID-19 pandemic.

== Finals ==
Year	Champion (average in final)	Score	Runner-up (average in final)	Prize money			Sponsor	Venue
Year	Champion (average in final)	Score	Runner-up (average in final)	Total	Champion	Runner-up	Sponsor	Venue
2009	(England) Phil Taylor (98.04)	16–9	(Scotland) Robert Thornton (88.52)	£200,000	£50,000	£25,000	Coral.co.uk	Circus Tavern, Purfleet
2010	(Australia) Paul Nicholson (92.75)	13–11	(England) Mervyn King (89.74)	£250,000	£60,000	£24,000	totesport.com	Circus Tavern, Purfleet
2011 (Feb)	(England) Phil Taylor (97.01)	13–12	(Scotland) Gary Anderson (96.31)	£250,000	£60,000	£24,000	Perform	Doncaster Dome, Doncaster
2011 (Dec)	(England) Kevin Painter (96.28)	13–9	(Wales) Mark Webster (93.31)	£250,000	£60,000	£24,000	Cash Converters	Doncaster Dome, Doncaster
2012	(England) Phil Taylor (103.57)	13–6	(Belgium) Kim Huybrechts (91.70)	£250,000	£60,000	£24,000	Cash Converters	Butlins Resort, Minehead
2013	(Netherlands) Michael van Gerwen (102.45)	11–7	(England) Phil Taylor (102.64)	£250,000	£60,000	£24,000	Cash Converters	Butlins Resort, Minehead
2014	(Scotland) Gary Anderson (101.01)	11–6	(England) Adrian Lewis (95.37)	£300,000	£65,000	£35,000	Cash Converters	Butlins Resort, Minehead
2015	(Netherlands) Michael van Gerwen (100.32)	11–6	(England) Adrian Lewis (89.17)	£300,000	£65,000	£35,000	Cash Converters	Butlins Resort, Minehead
2016	(Netherlands) Michael van Gerwen (108.34)	11–3	(England) Dave Chisnall (99.24)	£400,000	£75,000	£35,000	Cash Converters	Butlins Resort, Minehead
2017	(Netherlands) Michael van Gerwen (105.50)	11–2	(Wales) Jonny Clayton (94.64)	£460,000	£100,000	£40,000	Mr Green Sport	Butlins Resort, Minehead
2018	(Northern Ireland) Daryl Gurney (95.61)	11–9	(Netherlands) Michael van Gerwen (100.20)	£460,000	£100,000	£40,000	Ladbrokes	Butlins Resort, Minehead
2019	(Netherlands) Michael van Gerwen (97.92)	11–9	(Wales) Gerwyn Price (96.48)	£500,000	£100,000	£50,000	Ladbrokes	Butlins Resort, Minehead
2020	(Netherlands) Michael van Gerwen (104.98)	11–10	(England) Mervyn King (99.78)	£500,000	£100,000	£50,000	Ladbrokes	Ricoh Arena, Coventry
2021	(Scotland) Peter Wright (95.49)	11–10	(England) Ryan Searle (92.10)	£500,000	£100,000	£50,000	Ladbrokes	Butlins Resort, Minehead
2022	(Netherlands) Michael van Gerwen (99.92)	11–6	(England) Rob Cross (100.33)	£500,000	£100,000	£50,000	Cazoo	Butlins Resort, Minehead
2023	(England) Luke Humphries (100.75)	11–9	(Netherlands) Michael van Gerwen (103.19)	£600,000	£120,000	£60,000	Cazoo	Butlins Resort, Minehead
2024	(England) Luke Humphries (103.69)	11–7	(England) Luke Littler (100.08)	£600,000	£120,000	£60,000	Ladbrokes	Butlins Resort, Minehead
2025	(England) Luke Littler (103.33)	11–8	(England) Nathan Aspinall (93.64)	£600,000	£120,000	£60,000	Ladbrokes	Butlins Resort, Minehead

== Records and statistics ==
As of 23 November 2025.

=== Total finalist appearances ===
Rank	Player	Nationality	Won	Runner-up	Finals	Appearances
1	**Michael van Gerwen**	Netherlands	7	2	9	16
2	Phil Taylor	England	3	1	4	9
3	**Luke Humphries**	England	2	0	2	7
4	**Gary Anderson**	Scotland	1	1	2	16
4	**Luke Littler**	England	1	1	2	2
6	Paul Nicholson	Australia	1	0	1	5
6	Kevin Painter	England	1	0	1	9
6	**Daryl Gurney**	Northern Ireland	1	0	1	11
6	**Peter Wright**	Scotland	1	0	1	14
10	**Adrian Lewis**	England	0	2	2	14
10	**Mervyn King**	England	0	2	2	16
12	Robert Thornton	Scotland	0	1	1	9
12	Mark Webster	Wales	0	1	1	7
12	**Kim Huybrechts**	Belgium	0	1	1	13
12	**Dave Chisnall**	England	0	1	1	15
12	**Jonny Clayton**	Wales	0	1	1	10
12	**Gerwyn Price**	Wales	0	1	1	11
12	**Ryan Searle**	England	0	1	1	9
12	**Rob Cross**	England	0	1	1	9
12	**Nathan Aspinall**	England	0	1	1	7

- Active players are shown in **bold**
- Only players who reached the final are included
- In the event of identical records, players are sorted by date first achieved

=== Champions by country ===
Country	Players	Total	First title	Last title
Netherlands	1	7	2013	2022
England	4	7	2009	2025
Scotland	2	2	2014	2021
Australia	1	1	2010	2010
Northern Ireland	1	1	2018	2018

=== Nine-dart finishes ===
Four nine-darters have been thrown at the Players Championship Finals. The first one was in 2016, which is the only one of the four that wasn't done on the Main Stage.

Player	Year (+ Round)	Method	Opponent	Result
(England) Alan Norris	2016, Last 64	3 x T20; 3 x T20; T20, T19, D12	(England) Michael Smith	Won
(Netherlands) Michael van Gerwen	2019, Last 32	3 x T20; 2 x T20, T19; 2 x T20, D12	(England) Adrian Lewis	Won
(Netherlands) Michael van Gerwen	2022, Final	2 x T20, T19; 3 x T20; 2 x T20, D12	(England) Rob Cross	Won
(Netherlands) Michael van Gerwen	2023, Final	3 x T20; 3 x T20; T20, T19, D12	(England) Luke Humphries	Lost

=== High averages ===
Players Championship Finals ten highest one-match averages
Average	Player	Year (+ Round)	Opponent	Result
118.52	(Netherlands) Michael van Gerwen	2023, Last 32	(England) Ross Smith	6–1
112.73	(England) Luke Littler	2024, Last 64	(England) Rob Cross	6–0
112.27	(Northern Ireland) Josh Rock	2023, Last 32	(Germany) Gabriel Clemens	3–6
112.05	(Netherlands) Dirk van Duijvenbode	2022, Last 16	(England) Ryan Searle	10–9
111.58	(England) Phil Taylor	2013, Quarter-Final	(Netherlands) Raymond van Barneveld	9–2
111.12	(England) Ian White	2018, Last 64	(England) Scott Taylor	6–2
110.62	(Scotland) Gary Anderson	2014, Last 32	(Netherlands) Christian Kist	6–5
110.02	(Scotland) Gary Anderson	2018, Quarter-Final	(Wales) Jonny Clayton	10–4
110.01	(Netherlands) Michael van Gerwen	2020, Quarter-Final	(Netherlands) Dirk van Duijvenbode	10–5
109.88	(England) Dave Chisnall	2023, Last 32	(England) Chris Dobey	6–4

Five highest losing averages
Average	Player	Year (+ Round)	Opponent	Result
112.27	(Northern Ireland) Josh Rock	2023, Last 32	(Germany) Gabriel Clemens	3–6
107.79	(Croatia) Boris Krčmar	2020, Last 64	(England) Michael Smith	5–6
107.12	(Netherlands) Jermaine Wattimena	2020, Last 32	(England) Luke Humphries	4–6
105.85	(Northern Ireland) Daryl Gurney	2016, Last 32	(Belgium) Kim Huybrechts	1–6
105.79	(Wales) Gerwyn Price	2018, Last 64	(Poland) Krzysztof Ratajski	5–6

Different players with a 100+ match average – updated 23/11/25
Player	Total	Highest Av.	Year (+ Round)
(Netherlands) Michael van Gerwen	40	118.52	2023, Last 32
(England) Phil Taylor	18	111.58	2013, Quarter-Final
(Scotland) Gary Anderson	16	110.62	2014, Last 32
(England) Luke Littler	12	112.73	2024, Last 64
(England) Luke Humphries	10	107.60	2020, Last 32
(Northern Ireland) Daryl Gurney	8	108.81	2024, Last 64
(Wales) Gerwyn Price	8	108.75	2019, Quarter-Final
(Scotland) Peter Wright	8	104.83	2020, Last 64
(Netherlands) Jermaine Wattimena	7	108.94	2025, Last 32
(England) Stephen Bunting	7	107.03	2019, Last 16
(England) Ian White	6	111.12	2018, Last 64
(Netherlands) Raymond van Barneveld	6	107.40	2016, Last 64
(Netherlands) Danny Noppert	6	106.59	2022, Last 64
(England) Mervyn King	6	105.12	2020, Last 64
(England) Adrian Lewis	6	105.03	2014, Last 32
(England) Rob Cross	6	104.17	2022, Quarter-Final
(England) James Wade	6	102.95	2014, Last 32
(Netherlands) Dirk van Duijvenbode	5	112.05	2022, Last 16
(England) Dave Chisnall	5	109.88	2023, Last 32
(Belgium) Kim Huybrechts	5	108.10	2016, Last 32
(England) Ryan Searle	5	106.62	2023, Last 32
(England) Michael Smith	5	103.04	2020, Last 32
(England) Ross Smith	4	105.26	2024, Quarter-Final
(England) Nathan Aspinall	4	101.66	2020, Last 32
(England) Chris Dobey	3	104.57	2025, Last 16
(England) Colin Lloyd	3	102.36	2010, Last 16
(Northern Ireland) Josh Rock	2	112.27	2023, Last 32
(Australia) Simon Whitlock	2	109.54	2012, Last 16
(England) Ryan Meikle	2	108.76	2021, Last 64
(Netherlands) Jelle Klaasen	2	108.74	2014, Last 32
(England) Alan Norris	2	106.24	2016, Last 64
(Netherlands) Vincent van der Voort	2	104.86	2014, Last 32
(Netherlands) Gian van Veen	2	104.21	2024, Last 64
(England) Wes Newton	2	103.14	2011(**Feb**), Last 32
(Portugal) José de Sousa	2	102.96	2020, Last 16
(Germany) Gabriel Clemens	2	102.20	2019, Last 16
(England) Andrew Gilding	2	100.91	2022, Last 64
(England) Terry Jenkins	2	100.89	2014, Last 32
(England) Andy Smith	2	100.36	2011(**Feb**), Quarter-Final
(Netherlands) Jeffrey de Zwaan	2	100.32	2020, Last 64
(Croatia) Boris Krčmar	1	107.79	2020, Last 64
(England) Robbie Green	1	105.79	2016, Last 32
(Netherlands) Benito van de Pas	1	105.39	2015, Last 16
(Poland) Krzysztof Ratajski	1	105.38	2018, Last 64
(England) Ritchie Edhouse	1	105.35	2024, Last 32
(Scotland) Robert Thornton	1	104.21	2013, Last 32
(England) Dean Winstanley	1	103.94	2014, Last 32
(Germany) Ricardo Pietreczko	1	103.36	2023, Last 32
(England) Darren Webster	1	103.32	2017, Last 32
(Republic of Ireland) William O'Connor	1	102.85	2020, Last 64
(Austria) Mensur Suljović	1	102.79	2016, Last 64
(Netherlands) Wessel Nijman	1	102.41	2025, Last 64
(Germany) Martin Schindler	1	102.17	2022, Last 64
(Republic of Ireland) Steve Lennon	1	102.16	2020, Last 64
(England) Andy Hamilton	1	102.16	2012, Quarter-Final
(South Africa) Devon Petersen	1	101.46	2020, Last 64
(Belgium) Mike De Decker	1	101.33	2024, Last 32
(England) Joe Cullen	1	101.33	2016, Last 32
(Wales) Jonny Clayton	1	101.28	2020, Last 64
(Netherlands) Jeffrey de Graaf	1	101.22	2016, Last 32
(England) Scott Williams	1	101.08	2024, Last 16
(England) Cam Crabtree	1	101.05	2025, Last 32
(Scotland) Andy Boulton	1	100.86	2021, Last 64
(Netherlands) Niels Zonneveld	1	100.85	2023, Last 64
(Republic of Ireland) Keane Barry	1	100.70	2022, Last 32
(Netherlands) Christian Kist	1	100.40	2014, Last 32
(England) Wayne Jones	1	100.13	2020, Last 64
(England) Callan Rydz	1	100.10	2021, Last 32
(Wales) Mark Webster	1	100.02	2011(**Feb**), Last 32

Five highest tournament averages (min 3 matches)
Average	Player	Year	Round (+result
105.66	(England) Luke Littler	2025	Final (Won)
105.42	(Scotland) Gary Anderson	2018	Semi-Final
105.20	(England) Phil Taylor	2014	Quarter-Final
105.16	(England) Luke Littler	2024	Final (Lost)
104.72	(Scotland) Gary Anderson	2014	Final (Won)

== Television coverage ==
In the UK and Ireland, the first two tournaments were broadcast on ITV4 with the third edition being screened by PDC TV. The fourth edition returned to ITV4 where it has stayed ever since and ITV4 signed a long-term deal to cover the European Championships, Players Championships, UK Open and new tournament the Masters from 2014 to 2016.

TV broadcasters

- 2009–2010: ITV4
- February 2011: PDC TV
- December 2011–present: ITV4
