= Ray Campbell =

Northern Irish darts player

Personal information
- Full name: Raymond Campbell
- Nickname: The Rainman
- Born: 4 April 1967 (age 59) Belfast, County Antrim, Northern Ireland
- Home town: Newcastle, Northern Ireland

Sport
- Sport: Darts
- Playing since: 2001
- Darts: Target Carrera C4 24g
- Laterality: Right-handed
- Walk-on music: "Let Me Entertain You" by Robbie Williams

Organisation (see split in darts)
- BDO: 2007–2015
- PDC: 2015–

WDF major events – best performances
- World Masters: Last 190: 2007

Other achievements
- 2016 Wins PDC Tour Card

Raymond Campbell (born 4 April 1967) is a Northern Irish professional darts player who plays in Professional Darts Corporation events.

Campbell won a two-year PDC Tour Card on the third day of 2016 Q-School. He made his European Tour debut at the 2017 European Darts Open, losing 6–2 to John Henderson in the first round.

Campbell was only able to pick up £2,750 on the PDC Order of Merit over his two-year card and lost it after the 2017 season. Campbell attempted to regain his tour card at Q-School in 2018 and 2020.
