= 2016 PDC Pro Tour =

Darts tournaments

The 2016 PDC Pro Tour was a series of non-televised darts tournaments organised by the Professional Darts Corporation (PDC). Players Championships, UK Open Qualifiers and European Tour events are the events that make up the Pro Tour. In 2016 there were 36 PDC Pro Tour events held – 20 Players Championships, six UK Open Qualifiers and ten European Tour events.

== Prize money ==
Prize money for each Players Championship increased from £60,000 to £75,000 per event. The UK Open Qualifiers and European Tour events stayed the same as in 2015.

This is how the prize money is divided:

Stage	ET	PC	UKQ	CT/DT
Winner	£25,000	£10,000	£10,000	£2,000
Runner-up	£10,000	£6,000	£5,000	£1,000
Semi-finalists	£5,000	£3,000	£2,500	£500
Quarter-finalists	£3,500	£2,250	£2,000	£300
Last 16	£2,000	£1,500	£1,500	£200
Last 32	£1,500	£1,000	£750	£100
Last 48	£1,000	N/A	N/A	N/A
Last 64	N/A	£500	£250	£50
Total	£115,000	£75,000	£60,000	£10,000

== PDC Tour Cards ==
128 players are granted Tour Cards, which enables them to participate in all Players Championships, UK Open Qualifiers and European Tour events.

=== Tour Cards ===
The 2016 Tour Cards are awarded to:

- (63) The top 64 players from the PDC Order of Merit after the 2016 World Championship.
  - Kevin McDine resigned his card.
- (27) The 27 of 34 qualifiers from 2015 Q-School not ranked in the top 64 of the PDC Order of Merit following the World Championship.
  - Steve Douglas resigned his card.
- (2) Two highest qualifiers from 2015 Challenge Tour (Jan Dekker and Richie Corner).
  - Jan Dekker is also in the top 64 of the PDC Order of Merit, and therefore, a Pro Tour Card was awarded to Shaun Griffiths, who finished third on the Challenge Tour Order of Merit.
- (2) Two highest qualifiers from 2015 Development Tour (Mike De Decker and ~~Bradley Kirk~~).
  - Bradley Kirk turned down his Tour Card, which was subsequently awarded to Berry van Peer.
- (2) Two highest qualifiers from 2014 Challenge Tour (Mark Frost and Alan Tabern).
- (1) Two highest qualifiers from 2014 Development Tour (Dimitri Van den Bergh and Josh Payne).
  - Dimitri Van den Bergh is also in the top 64 of the PDC Order of Merit, and therefore, one extra Tour Card was awarded to a Q-School qualifier.
- (1) The winner of the 2015 Scandinavian Order of Merit (Kim Viljanen).
- (16) The 16 qualifiers from 2016 Q-School.

Afterwards, the playing field was complemented by the highest qualified players from the Q School Order of Merit until the maximum number of 128 Pro Tour Card players had been reached. In 2016, that meant a total of 14 players qualified this way.

=== Q-School ===
The PDC Pro Tour Qualifying School took place at the Robin Park Tennis Centre in Wigan from January 13–16. The following players won two-year tour cards on each of the days played:

January 13	January 14	January 15	January 16
John Bowles; Simon Stevenson; Andy Parsons; Ricky Williams	Jonathan Worsley; James Richardson; Ted Evetts; Ryan Meikle	Ray Campbell; Jeffrey de Graaf; Tony Newell; Brian Woods	Ryan Palmer; Ross Smith; Yordi Meeuwisse; Vincent Kamphuis
371 contestants	372 contestants	364 contestants	350 contestants

A Q School Order of Merit was also created by using the following points system:

Stage	Points
Last 8	9
Last 16	5
Last 32	3
Last 64	2
Last 128	1

To complete the field of 128 Tour Card Holders, places were allocated down the final Qualifying School Order of Merit. The following players picked up Tour Cards as a result:

1. Mark Walsh
2. John Michael
3. Dick van Dijk
4. Harry Robinson
5. Mark Barilli
6. Matt Clark
7. Terry Temple
8. Darron Brown
9. Dennis Smith
10. Mick McGowan
11. Simon Preston
12. Matthew Dennant
13. Robert Owen
14. Ron Meulenkamp

== UK Open Qualifiers ==
Six qualifiers took place to determine seedings for the 2016 UK Open.

No.	Date	Venue	Winner	Score	Runner-up	Ref.
1	Friday 5 February	(England) Wigan, Robin Park Tennis Centre	Adrian Lewis	6 – 2	Phil Taylor	
2	Saturday 6 February	(England) Wigan, Robin Park Tennis Centre	Michael van Gerwen	6 – 4	Alan Norris	
3	Sunday 7 February	(England) Wigan, Robin Park Tennis Centre	Phil Taylor	6 − 2	Michael van Gerwen	
4	Friday 19 February	(England) Wigan, Robin Park Tennis Centre	Gary Anderson	6 – 1	James Wade	
5	Saturday 20 February	(England) Wigan, Robin Park Tennis Centre	Michael van Gerwen	6 – 2	Gerwyn Price	
6	Sunday 21 February	(England) Wigan, Robin Park Tennis Centre	Michael van Gerwen	6 – 2	Steve Beaton	

== Players Championships ==
The PDC Players Championships (PC) are a series of non-televised darts events that are part of the PDC Pro Tour. As with the last two years, the number of events remained at 20 Players Championship events per year.

2016 PDC Players Championship season
No.	Date	Venue	Winner	Legs	Runner-up	Ref.
1	Saturday 12 March	(England) Barnsley Metrodome	Peter Wright	6 – 5	Adrian Lewis	
2	Sunday 13 March	(England) Barnsley Metrodome	Stephen Bunting	6 – 4	Michael van Gerwen	
3	Friday 8 April	(England) Barnsley Metrodome	Michael van Gerwen	6 – 3	Benito van de Pas	
4	Saturday 9 April	(England) Barnsley Metrodome	Benito van de Pas	6 – 5	Michael van Gerwen	
5	Sunday 10 April	(England) Barnsley Metrodome	Ian White	6 – 0	Michael van Gerwen	
6	Saturday 30 April	(England) Barnsley Metrodome	Josh Payne	6 – 5	James Wade	
7	Sunday 1 May	(England) Barnsley Metrodome	Gerwyn Price	6 – 3	Peter Wright	
8	Saturday 21 May	(England) Coventry Arena	Gerwyn Price	6 – 1	Jamie Caven	
9	Sunday 22 May	(England) Coventry Arena	Benito van de Pas	6 – 0	Joe Cullen	
10	Saturday 2 July	(England) Barnsley Metrodome	Dave Chisnall	6 – 2	Steve Beaton	
11	Sunday 3 July	(England) Barnsley Metrodome	Ian White	6 – 3	Joe Cullen	
12	Saturday 6 August	(England) Barnsley Metrodome	Gary Anderson	6 – 5	Terry Jenkins	
13	Sunday 7 August	(England) Barnsley Metrodome	Ian White	6 – 4	Benito van de Pas	
14	Tuesday 20 September	(England) Barnsley Metrodome	Michael van Gerwen	6 – 0	Mensur Suljović	
15	Wednesday 21 September	(England) Barnsley Metrodome	Michael van Gerwen	6 – 3	James Wilson	
16	Thursday 22 September	(England) Barnsley Metrodome	Michael van Gerwen	6 – 5	Steve West	
17	Friday 30 September	(Republic of Ireland) Citywest Hotel, Dublin	Michael van Gerwen	6 – 1	Christian Kist	
18	Saturday 1 October	(Republic of Ireland) Citywest Hotel, Dublin	Simon Whitlock	6 – 5	Ronny Huybrechts	
19	Friday 21 October	(England) Barnsley Metrodome	Simon Whitlock	6 – 4	Chris Dobey	
20	Saturday 22 October	(England) Barnsley Metrodome	Benito van de Pas	6 – 1	Dave Chisnall	

== European Tour ==
Compared to 2015, one European Tour event was added to the calendar. In addition, the top 32 of the European Tour qualified for the European Championship.

No.	Date	Venue	Location	Winner	Legs	Runner-up	Ref.
1	12–14 February	Dutch Darts Masters	(Netherlands) Venray, Evenementenhal	Michael van Gerwen (112.26)	6 – 2	Daryl Gurney (96.89)	
2	26–28 March	German Darts Masters	(Germany) Munich, Ballhausforum	Michael van Gerwen (92.72)	6 – 4	Peter Wright (93.20)	
3	6–8 May	Gibraltar Darts Trophy	Gibraltar, Victoria Stadium	Michael van Gerwen (103.89)	6 – 2	Dave Chisnall (103.19)	
4	13–15 May	European Darts Matchplay	(Germany) Hamburg, Inselparkhalle	James Wade (92.71)	6 – 5	Dave Chisnall (93.55)	
5	10–12 June	Austrian Darts Open	(Austria) Vienna, Multiversum Schwechat	Phil Taylor (97.34)	6 – 4	Michael Smith (92.82)	
6	29–31 July	European Darts Open	(Germany) Düsseldorf, Maritim Hotel	Michael van Gerwen (104.06)	6 – 5	Peter Wright (100.44)	
7	2–4 September	International Darts Open	(Germany) Riesa, SACHSENarena	Mensur Suljović (95.15)	6 – 5	Kim Huybrechts (93.89)	
8	9–11 September	European Darts Trophy	(Germany) Mülheim, RWE-Sporthalle	Michael van Gerwen (106.77)	6 – 5	Mensur Suljović (101.26)	
9	16–18 September	European Darts Grand Prix	(Germany) Sindelfingen, Glaspalast	Michael van Gerwen (105.38)	6 – 2	Peter Wright (102.36)	
10	14–16 October	German Darts Championship	(Germany) Hildesheim, Halle 39	Alan Norris (97.48)	6 – 5	Jelle Klaasen (89.19)	

== PDC Challenge Tour ==
The PDC Unicorn Challenge Tour was open to all PDPA Associate Members who failed to win a Tour Card at Qualifying School. The players who finished first and second received two-year Tour Cards to move onto the PDC Pro Tour in 2017 and 2018. In addition, the players who finished from third to eighth will receive free entry to the 2017 PDC Q-School.

No.	Date	Venue	Winner	Legs	Runner-up	Ref.
1	Saturday 19 March	(England) Wigan, Robin Park Tennis Centre	Chris Quantock	5 – 3	Rob Cross	
2	Saturday 19 March	(England) Wigan, Robin Park Tennis Centre	Barry Lynn	5 – 4	Rob Modra	
3	Sunday 20 March	(England) Wigan, Robin Park Tennis Centre	Ritchie Edhouse	5 – 0	Mark Dudbridge	
4	Sunday 20 March	(England) Wigan, Robin Park Tennis Centre	Bryan de Hoog	5 – 4	Peter Hudson	
5	Saturday 28 May	(England) Wigan, Robin Park Tennis Centre	Nick Fullwell	5 – 1	Rob Cross	
6	Saturday 28 May	(England) Wigan, Robin Park Tennis Centre	Adam Hunt	5 – 3	Jamie Bain	
7	Sunday 29 May	(England) Wigan, Robin Park Tennis Centre	Ryan Searle	5 – 2	Mark Dudbridge	
8	Sunday 29 May	(England) Wigan, Robin Park Tennis Centre	Scott Taylor	5 – 4	Barry Lynn	
9	Saturday 25 June	(England) Milton Keynes, Arena MK	Matt Padgett	5 – 4	Lee Evans	
10	Saturday 25 June	(England) Milton Keynes, Arena MK	Rob Cross	5 – 2	Mark Dudbridge	
11	Sunday 26 June	(England) Milton Keynes, Arena MK	Richie Burnett	5 – 2	Ryan Searle	
12	Sunday 26 June	(England) Milton Keynes, Arena MK	Kelvin Hart	5 – 3	René Eidams	
13	Saturday 10 September	(England) Wigan, Robin Park Tennis Centre	Rob Cross	5 – 1	Michael Barnard	
14	Saturday 10 September	(England) Wigan, Robin Park Tennis Centre	Richie Burnett	5 – 1	Arron Monk	
15	Sunday 11 September	(England) Wigan, Robin Park Tennis Centre	Rob Cross	5 – 0	Martyn Turner	
16	Sunday 11 September	(England) Wigan, Robin Park Tennis Centre	Ryan Searle	5 – 1	Barrie Bates	

== PDC Development Tour ==
The PDC Unicorn Development Tour is open to players aged 16–23. The Development Tour is expanded from 16 to 20 tournaments, where event number 20 is the PDC Youth World Championship from the Last 64 onwards. The players who finish first and second on the Order of Merit will receive two-year Tour Cards to move onto the PDC Pro Tour in 2017 and 2018. In addition, the players who finish from third to eighth will receive free entry to the 2017 PDC Q-School.

No.	Date	Venue	Winner	Legs	Runner-up	Ref.
1	Saturday 26 March	(England) Wigan, Robin Park Tennis Centre	Callum Loose	4 – 0	Rowby-John Rodriguez	
2	Saturday 26 March	(England) Wigan, Robin Park Tennis Centre	Steve Lennon	4 – 2	Kurt Parry	
3	Sunday 27 March	(England) Wigan, Robin Park Tennis Centre	Josh Payne	4 – 1	Rowby-John Rodriguez	
4	Sunday 27 March	(England) Wigan, Robin Park Tennis Centre	Adam Hunt	4 – 2	Dean Reynolds	
5	Saturday 23 April	(Germany) Mülheim, Harbecke Sporthalle	Max Hopp	4 – 2	Steve Lennon	
6	Saturday 23 April	(Germany) Mülheim, Harbecke Sporthalle	Ross Twell	4 – 2	Adam Hunt	
7	Sunday 24 April	(Germany) Mülheim, Harbecke Sporthalle	Kenny Neyens	4 – 1	Callum Loose	
8	Sunday 24 April	(Germany) Mülheim, Harbecke Sporthalle	Dean Reynolds	4 – 3	Rowby-John Rodriguez	
9	Saturday 14 May	(England) Wigan, Robin Park Tennis Centre	Dean Reynolds	4 – 3	Bradley Kirk	
10	Saturday 14 May	(England) Wigan, Robin Park Tennis Centre	Ross Twell	4 – 2	Jimmy Hendriks	
11	Sunday 15 May	(England) Wigan, Robin Park Tennis Centre	Aden Kirk	4 – 3	Keegan Brown	
12	Sunday 15 May	(England) Wigan, Robin Park Tennis Centre	Ross Twell	4 – 3	Luke Humphries	
13	Saturday 3 September	(England) Wigan, Robin Park Tennis Centre	Dean Reynolds	4 – 2	Aaron Dyer	
14	Saturday 3 September	(England) Wigan, Robin Park Tennis Centre	Dimitri Van den Bergh	4 – 2	Steve Lennon	
15	Sunday 4 September	(England) Wigan, Robin Park Tennis Centre	Dean Reynolds	4 – 3	John de Kruijf	
16	Sunday 4 September	(England) Wigan, Robin Park Tennis Centre	Dean Reynolds	4 – 1	Aden Kirk	
17	Saturday 15 October	(England) Wigan, Robin Park Tennis Centre	Dean Reynolds	4 – 3	Justin van Tergouw	
18	Saturday 15 October	(England) Wigan, Robin Park Tennis Centre	Corey Cadby	4 – 2	Jeffrey de Zwaan	
19	Sunday 16 October	(England) Wigan, Robin Park Tennis Centre	Mike De Decker	4 – 3	Berry van Peer	

== Scandinavian Darts Corporation Pro Tour ==
The Scandinavian Pro Tour had eight events in 2016, with a total of €40,000 on offer. The top player and the runner-up on the SDC Order of Merit 2016 will play in the 2017 World Championship preliminary round.

Leading the overall table, Kim Viljanen and Magnus Caris won their places in the 2017 World Championship.

No.	Date	Venue	Winner	Legs	Runner-up	Ref.
1	Saturday 30 January	(Finland) Tuusula, Hotel Gustavelund	Per Laursen	6 – 4	Dennis Nilsson	
2	Sunday 31 January	(Finland) Tuusula, Hotel Gustavelund	Kim Viljanen	6 – 3	Magnus Caris	
3	Saturday 19 March	(Denmark) Copenhagen, Hotel Park Inn by Radisson	Daniel Larsson	6 – 5	Magnus Caris	
4	Sunday 20 March	(Denmark) Copenhagen, Hotel Park Inn by Radisson	Kim Viljanen	6 – 1	Daniel Jensen	
5	Saturday 27 August	(Sweden) Gothenburg, Apple Hotel	Madars Razma	6 – 0	Aaron Knox	
6	Sunday 28 August	(Sweden) Gothenburg, Apple Hotel	Kim Viljanen	6 – 2	Daniel Larsson	
7	Saturday 8 October	(Sweden) Gothenburg, Apple Hotel	Roland Lenngren	6 – 4	Per Laursen	
8	Saturday 9 October	(Sweden) Gothenburg, Apple Hotel	Magnus Caris	6 – 4	Cor Dekker	

== EuroAsian Darts Corporation (EADC) Pro Tour ==
The 6 EADC Pro Tour events and the 2017 World Championship Qualifier were played at Omega Plaza Business Center, Moscow. Players from Armenia, Azerbaijan, Belarus, Georgia, Kazakhstan, Kyrgyzstan, Moldova, Russia, Tajikistan, Turkmenistan, Uzbekistan and Ukraine are eligible to play.

No.	Date	Venue	Winner	Legs	Runner-up	Ref.
1	Saturday 27 February	(Russia) Moscow, Omega Plaza Business Center	Boris Koltsov	6 – 4	Aleksei Kadochnikov	
2	Sunday 28 February	(Russia) Moscow, Omega Plaza Business Center	Roman Obukhov	6 – 3	Boris Koltsov	
3	Saturday 26 March	(Russia) Moscow, Omega Plaza Business Center	Anton Kolesov	6 – 5	Roman Obukhov	
4	Sunday 27 March	(Russia) Moscow, Omega Plaza Business Center	Boris Koltsov	6 – 1	Nikolai Mikhalin	
5	Saturday 23 April	(Russia) Moscow, Omega Plaza Business Center	Boris Koltsov	6 – 3	Roman Obukhov	
6	Sunday 24 April	(Russia) Moscow, Omega Plaza Business Center	Boris Koltsov	6 – 5	Roman Obukhov	

== Australian Grand Prix Pro Tour ==
The Australian Grand Prix rankings are calculated from events across Australia. The top player in the rankings automatically qualified for the 2017 World Championship.

Corey Cadby secured top spot in the Australian Grand Prix rankings and will qualify for the 2017 World Championship. David Platt also won a place in the 2017 World Championship by winning the Oceanic Masters and therefore he will join Cadby and DPNZ qualifier Warren Parry to compete in the World Championship.

No.	Date	Also known as	Winner	Legs	Runner-up	Ref.
1	Friday 5 February	Chester Hill Open 1	Corey Cadby	6 – 5	John Weber	
2	Saturday 6 February	Chester Hill Open 2	David Platt	6 – 2	Harley Kemp	
3	Sunday 7 February	Chester Hill Open 3	Gordon Mathers	6 – 2	Corey Cadby	
4	Friday 4 March	Victoria Open 1	Corey Cadby	6 – 2	David Platt	
5	Saturday 5 March	Victoria Open 2	Corey Cadby	6 – 5	Tyson Hoeful	
6	Sunday 6 March	Victoria Open 3	Corey Cadby	6 – 2	Laurence Ryder	
7	Saturday 19 March	DPA Perth Open 1	David Platt	6 – 3	Koha Kokiri	
8	Sunday 20 March	DPA Perth Open 2	David Platt	6 – 4	Corey Cadby	
9	Saturday 2 April	Warilla Bowls Club Open 1	Dave Marland	6 – 5	David Platt	
10	Sunday 3 April	Warilla Bowls Club Open 2	Corey Cadby	6 – 5	Harley Kemp	
11	Saturday 30 April	NDDA Open 1	David Platt	6 – 4	Tic Bridge	
12	Sunday 1 May	NDDA Open 2	David Platt	6 – 1	Tyson Hoeful	
13	Thursday 26 May	DPA Australian Singles	Corey Cadby	6 – 1	Darren Herewini	
14	Friday 27 May	DPA Australian Open	Damon Heta	6 – 1	John Weber	
15	Friday 24 June	Queensland Open 1	David Platt	6 – 2	John Matheson	
16	Saturday 25 June	Queensland Open 2	Corey Cadby	6 – 3	Lucas Cameron	
17	Sunday 26 June	Queensland Open 3	Corey Cadby	6 – 0	Steve MacArthur	
18	Saturday 30 July	Sydney Masters Qualifier 1	Rhys Mathewson	6 – 5	Jeremy Fagg	
19	Sunday 31 July	Sydney Masters Qualifier 2	Cody Harris	6 – 5	Warren Parry	
20	Monday 1 August	Sydney Masters Qualifier 3	David Platt	6 – 4	Harley Kemp	
21	Friday 4 November	Harrows Australian GP 21	Rob Szabo	6 – 0	Damon Heta	
22	Saturday 5 November	Harrows Australian GP 22	Cody Harris	6 – 5	Rhys Mathewson	
23	Sunday 6 November	Harrows Oceanic Masters	David Platt	6 – 0	Cody Harris	
24	Sunday 20 November	Harrows Oceanic Classic	Warren Parry	6 – 4	Tony David	

== Chinese Tour ==
Stages One to Three will count towards the 2016 PDC World Cup of Darts, Stages Four to Seven for the inaugural 2016 Shanghai Darts Masters event and Stage Eight was a qualifier for the 2016 PDC World Youth Championship. Stage Thirteen was for the 2017 PDC World Darts Championship Qualification (see below at International Qualifiers).

No.	Date	Venue	Winner	Sets (Legs)	Runner-up	Ref.
1	Saturday 2 April	(China) Qingdao	Dawei Zhang	2 − 1 (0 − 3, 3 − 1, 3 − 2)	Weihong Li	
2	Saturday 9 April	(China) Guangzhou	Bin Ouyang	2 − 1 (3 − 2, 1 − 3, 3 − 1)	Hu Ling	
3	Saturday 23 April	(China) Ningbo	Lihao Wen	2 − 1 (3 − 1, 2 − 3, 3 − 2)	Jianhua Shen	
4	Saturday 14 May	(China) Jinan	Yanlai Shi	2 − 0 (3 − 1, 3 − 0)	Weihong Li	
5	Saturday 28 May	(China) Hangzhou	Guanshou Ruan	2 − 0 (3 − 0, 3 − 2)	Yuyi Shao	
6	Thursday 9 June	(China) Chongqing	Chenhao Li	2 − 0 (3 − 1, 3 − 1)	Xuejie Huang	
7	Friday 24 June	(China) Shanghai	Qiang Wei	2 − 1 (1 − 3, 3 − 2, 3 − 1)	Fen Fiu	
8	July	(China) Qingdao	Zong Xiao Chen	6 − 4	Luming Zhao	
9	Saturday 27 August	(China) Shenyang	Chengan Liu	2 − 1 (1 − 3, 3 − 2, 3 − 2)	Yuanjun Liu	
10	September	(China) Changsha	Lihao Wen	2 − 0 (3 − 2, 3 − 2)	Wenge Xie	
11	September	(China) Yinchuan	Qiang Wei	2 − 1 (2 − 3, 3 − 1, 3 − 1)	Zong Xiao Chen	
12	Saturday 29 October	(China) Suzhou	Zong Xiao Chen	2 − 0 (3 − 1, 3 − 2)	Yuanjun Liu	

== World Championship PDPA Qualifier ==
The winner directly qualified for the first round, whereelse the runner-up and the two losers of the semi-finals entered the 2017 PDC World Darts Championship in the preliminary round.

Date	Venue	Winner	Score	Runner-up	Third	Fourth	Ref.
Monday 28 November	(England) Wigan, Robin Park Tennis Centre	Mark Frost	5 − 2	Kevin Simm	Simon Stevenson	John Bowles	

== World Championship International Qualifiers ==
Date	Event	Winner	Score	Runner-up	Ref.
Sunday 10 July	DPNZ Qualifier	Warren Parry	7 − 3	Rob Szabo	
Sunday 21 August	North American Qualifier	Ross Snook	3 – 0	Darin Young	
Saturday 8 October	Tom Kirby Memorial Irish Matchplay	Mick McGowan	6 – 5	Radek Szagański	
22–23 October	EADC Qualifier	Boris Koltsov	3 – 1	Odkhuu Khundaganai	
Sunday 23 October	Philippine Qualifier	Gilbert Ulang	4 – 1	Prussian Dela Crus	
Sunday 23 October	Southern Europe Qualifier	John Michael	6 – 0	Javier Toquero	
Sunday 30 October	Greater China Qualifier	Sun Qiang	3 – 2	Yuanjun Liu	
Sunday 6 November	Harrows Oceanic Masters	David Platt	6 − 0	Cody Harris	
Sunday 6 November	PDJ Japanese Qualifier	Masumi Chino	6 − 4	Yuya Akutsu	
Saturday 12 November	Eastern Europe Qualifier	Zoran Lerchbacher	10 – 1	Dietmar Burger	
Saturday 19 November	German Qualifier	Dragutin Horvat	10 – 6	Stefan Stoyke	
Sunday 20 November	South Asia Qualifier	Tengku Shah	3 – 2	Mark Jumin	
Sunday 20 November	Central Europe Qualifier	Jerry Hendriks	6 – 4	Jan Dekker	
