= Phil Taylor career statistics =

Professional darts statistics

Career finals
Tournament	Won	Lost	Total	WR^{1}
World Championships	16	5	21	76%
World Matchplay	16	1	17	94%
World Grand Prix	11	0	11	100%
Premier League	6	2	8	75%
UK Open	5	1	6	83%
Grand Slam of Darts	6	1	7	86%
World Masters	1	1	2	50%
World Darts Trophy	1	1	2	50%
Other PDC/BDO Majors	25	4	29	85%
Total	87	16	103	84%

This is a list of the main career statistics of English professional darts player Phil Taylor, whose professional career lasted from 1987 to 2018. Taylor won 214 professional titles and was runner-up in 48 finals. He won a record 87 major titles and a record 16 World Championships. In team events, he won 10 titles including being a four-time winner of the PDC World Cup of Darts and has had 2 runners-up finishes in team events. In 1999 and 2004 he defeated the reigning BDO champion in a special challenge match.

== Career finals ==
=== BDO major finals: 7 (4 titles) ===
Legend
World Championship (2–0)
Winmau World Masters (1–1)
World Darts Trophy (1–1)
British Matchplay (0–1)

Outcome	No.	Year	Championship	Opponent in the final	Score (Note: (l) = score in legs, (s) = score in sets, (m) = matches won.)	Ref.
Winner	1.	1990	World Championship	(England) Eric Bristow	6–1 (s)	
Winner	2.	1990	Winmau World Masters	(Scotland) Jocky Wilson	3–2 (s)	
Runner-up	1.	1991	British Matchplay	(England) Dennis Priestley	2–5 (s)	
Runner-up	2.	1991	Winmau World Masters	(England) Rod Harrington	2–3 (s)	
Winner	3.	1992	World Championship (2)	(England) Mike Gregory	6–5 (s)	
Winner	4.	2006	World Darts Trophy	(England) Martin Adams	7–2 (s)	
Runner-up	3.	2007	World Darts Trophy	(Scotland) Gary Anderson	3–7 (s)	

=== WDF major finals: 2 (2 titles) ===
Legend
Europe Cup (2–0)

Outcome	No.	Year	Championship	Opponent in the final	Score
Winner	1.	1990	Europe Cup Singles	(Wales) Eric Burden	4–3 (l)
Winner	2.	1992	Europe Cup Singles (2)	(England) John Lowe	4–2 (l)

=== PDC major finals: 92 (79 titles) ===
Legend
World Championship (14–5)
World Matchplay (16–1)
World Grand Prix (11–0)
Grand Slam (6–1)
Premier League (6–2)
UK Open (5–1)
Masters (1–0)
Champions League (1–0)
European Championship (4–0)
Players Championship Finals (3–1)
Championship League (4–2)
US Open / World Series of Darts (3–0)
Las Vegas Desert Classic (5–0)

Outcome	No.	Year	Championship	Opponent in the final	Score
Runner-up	1.	1994	World Championship	Dennis Priestley	1–6 (s)
Winner	1.	1995	World Championship	Rod Harrington	6–2 (s)
Winner	2.	1995	World Matchplay	Dennis Priestley	16–11 (l)
Winner	3.	1996	World Championship (2)	Dennis Priestley	6–4 (s)
Winner	4.	1997	World Championship (3)	Dennis Priestley	6–3 (s)
Winner	5.	1997	World Matchplay (2)	Alan Warriner-Little	16–11 (l)
Winner	6.	1998	World Championship (4)	Dennis Priestley	6–0 (s)
Winner	7.	1998	World Grand Prix	Rod Harrington	13–8 (s)
Winner	8.	1999	World Championship (5)	Peter Manley	6–2 (s)
Winner	9.	1999	World Grand Prix (2)	Shayne Burgess	6–1 (s)
Winner	10.	2000	World Championship (6)	Dennis Priestley	7–3 (s)
Winner	11.	2000	World Matchplay (3)	Alan Warriner-Little	18–12 (l)
Winner	12.	2000	World Grand Prix (3)	Shayne Burgess	6–1 (s)
Winner	13.	2001	World Championship (7)	John Part	7–0 (s)
Winner	14.	2001	World Matchplay (4)	Richie Burnett	18–10 (l)
Winner	15.	2002	World Darts Championship (8)	Peter Manley	7–0 (s)
Winner	16.	2002	Las Vegas Desert Classic	Ronnie Baxter	3–0 (s)
Winner	17.	2002	World Matchplay (5)	John Part	18–16 (l)
Winner	18.	2002	World Grand Prix (4)	John Part	7–3 (s)
Runner-up	2.	2003	World Championship (2)	John Part	6–7 (s)
Winner	19.	2003	UK Open	Shayne Burgess	18–8 (l)
Winner	20.	2003	World Matchplay (6)	Wayne Mardle	18–12 (l)
Winner	21.	2003	World Grand Prix (5)	John Part	7–2 (s)
Winner	22.	2004	World Championship (9)	Kevin Painter	7–6 (s)
Winner	23.	2004	Las Vegas Desert Classic (2)	Wayne Mardle	6–4 (s)
Winner	24.	2004	World Matchplay (7)	Mark Dudbridge	18–8 (l)
Winner	25.	2005	World Championship (10)	Mark Dudbridge	7–4 (s)
Winner	26.	2005	Premier League	Colin Lloyd	16–4 (l)
Winner	27.	2005	UK Open (2)	Mark Walsh	13–7 (l)
Winner	28.	2005	Las Vegas Desert Classic (3)	Wayne Mardle	6–1 (s)
Winner	29.	2005	World Grand Prix (6)	Colin Lloyd	7–1 (s)
Winner	30.	2006	World Championship (11)	Peter Manley	7–0 (s)
Winner	31.	2006	World Series of Darts	Adrian Lewis	13–5 (l)
Winner	32.	2006	Premier League (2)	Roland Scholten	16–6 (l)
Winner	33.	2006	World Matchplay (8)	James Wade	18–11 (l)
Winner	34.	2006	World Grand Prix (7)	Terry Jenkins	7–4 (s)
Runner-up	3.	2007	World Championship (3)	Raymond van Barneveld	6–7 (s)
Winner	35.	2007	US Open (2)	Raymond van Barneveld	4–1 (s)
Winner	36.	2007	Premier League (3)	Terry Jenkins	16–6 (l)
Winner	37.	2007	Grand Slam	Andy Hamilton	18–11 (l)
Winner	38.	2008	US Open (3)	Colin Lloyd	3–0 (s)
Winner	39.	2008	Premier League (4)	James Wade	16–8 (l)
Winner	40.	2008	Las Vegas Desert Classic (4)	James Wade	13–7 (l)
Winner	41.	2008	World Matchplay (9)	James Wade	18–9 (l)
Winner	42.	2008	World Grand Prix (8)	Raymond van Barneveld	6–2 (s)
Winner	43.	2008	Championship League	Mervyn King	7–5 (l)
Winner	44.	2008	European Championship	Adrian Lewis	11–5 (l)
Winner	45.	2008	Grand Slam (2)	Terry Jenkins	18–9 (l)
Winner	46.	2009	World Championship (12)	Raymond van Barneveld	7–1 (s)
Winner	47.	2009	Players Championship Finals	Robert Thornton	16–9 (l)
Winner	48.	2009	UK Open (3)	Colin Osborne	11–6 (l)
Winner	49.	2009	Las Vegas Desert Classic (5)	Raymond van Barneveld	13–11 (l)
Winner	50.	2009	World Matchplay (10)	Terry Jenkins	18–4 (l)
Winner	51.	2009	World Grand Prix (9)	Raymond van Barneveld	6–3 (s)
Runner-up	4.	2009	Championship League	Colin Osborne	4–6 (l)
Winner	52.	2009	European Championship (2)	Steve Beaton	11–3 (l)
Winner	53.	2009	Grand Slam (3)	Scott Waites	16–2 (l)
Winner	54.	2010	World Championship (13)	Simon Whitlock	7–3 (s)
Winner	55.	2010	Premier League (5)	James Wade	10–8 (l)
Winner	56.	2010	UK Open (4)	Gary Anderson	11–5 (l)
Winner	57.	2010	World Matchplay (11)	Raymond van Barneveld	18–12 (l)
Winner	58.	2010	European Championship (3)	Wayne Jones	11–1 (l)
Runner-up	5.	2010	Championship League	James Wade	5–6 (l)
Winner	59.	2011	Players Championship Finals (2)	Gary Anderson	13–12 (l)
Winner	60.	2011	World Matchplay (12)	James Wade	18–8 (l)
Winner	61.	2011	European Championship (4)	Adrian Lewis	11–8 (l)
Winner	62.	2011	World Grand Prix (10)	Brendan Dolan	6–3 (s)
Winner	63.	2011	Championship League (2)	Paul Nicholson	6–1 (l)
Winner	64.	2011	Grand Slam (4)	Gary Anderson	16–4 (l)
Winner	65.	2012	Premier League (6)	Simon Whitlock	10–7 (l)
Runner-up	6.	2012	UK Open	Robert Thornton	5–11 (l)
Winner	66.	2012	World Matchplay (13)	James Wade	18–15 (l)
Winner	67.	2012	Championship League (3)	Simon Whitlock	6–4 (l)
Winner	68.	2012	Players Championship Finals (3)	Kim Huybrechts	13–6 (l)
Winner	69.	2013	World Championship (14)	Michael van Gerwen	7–4 (s)
Runner-up	7.	2013	Premier League	Michael van Gerwen	8–10 (l)
Winner	70.	2013	UK Open (5)	Andy Hamilton	11–4 (l)
Winner	71.	2013	World Matchplay (14)	Adrian Lewis	18–13 (l)
Winner	72.	2013	World Grand Prix (11)	Dave Chisnall	6–0 (s)
Winner	73.	2013	Championship League (4)	Michael van Gerwen	6–3 (l)
Winner	74.	2013	Masters	Adrian Lewis	10–1 (l)
Winner	75.	2013	Grand Slam (5)	Robert Thornton	16–6 (l)
Runner-up	8.	2013	Players Championship Finals	Michael van Gerwen	7–11 (l)
Winner	76.	2014	World Matchplay (15)	Michael van Gerwen	18–9 (l)
Winner	77.	2014	Grand Slam (6)	Dave Chisnall	16–13 (l)
Runner-up	9.	2015	World Championship (4)	Gary Anderson	6–7 (s)
Runner-up	10.	2015	Grand Slam	Michael van Gerwen	13–16 (l)
Runner-up	11.	2016	Premier League	Michael van Gerwen	3–11 (l)
Runner-up	12.	2016	World Matchplay	Michael van Gerwen	10–18 (l)
Winner	78.	2016	Champions League	Michael van Gerwen	11–5 (l)
Winner	79.	2017	World Matchplay (16)	Peter Wright	18–8 (l)
Runner-up	13.	2018	World Championship (5)	Rob Cross	2–7 (s)

=== Independent major finals: 2 (2 titles) ===
Outcome	No.	Year	Championship	Opponent in the final	Score
Winner	1.	1997	News of the World Championship	(England) Ian White	2–0 (l)
Winner	2.	2005	Masters of Darts	(England) Andy Fordham	7–1 (s)

=== Other major finals: 2 (2 titles) ===
Outcome	No.	Year	Championship	Opponent	Score
Winner	1.	1999	Champion of Champions	(Netherlands) Raymond van Barneveld	21–10 (l)
Winner	2.	2004	Champion of Champions (2)	(England) Andy Fordham	5–2 (s)*

* The match was best of 13 sets, but Fordham retired after the seventh set due to ill-health

=== PDC world series finals: 10 (8 titles) ===
Legend
World Series of Darts (8–2)

Outcome	No.	Year	Championship	Opponent in the final	Score
Winner	1.	2013	Sydney Darts Masters	Michael van Gerwen	10–3 (l)
Winner	2.	2014	Sydney Darts Masters (2)	Stephen Bunting	11–3 (l)
Winner	3.	2014	Perth Darts Masters	Michael van Gerwen	11–9 (l)
Runner-up	1.	2015	Dubai Darts Masters	Michael van Gerwen	8–11 (l)
Winner	4.	2015	Japan Darts Masters	Peter Wright	8–7 (l)
Winner	5.	2015	Perth Darts Masters (2)	James Wade	11–7 (l)
Winner	6.	2015	Sydney Darts Masters (3)	Adrian Lewis	11–3 (l)
Winner	7.	2016	Sydney Darts Masters (4)	Michael van Gerwen	11–9 (l)
Winner	8.	2017	Melbourne Darts Masters	Peter Wright	11–8 (l)
Runner-up	2.	2017	German Darts Masters	Peter Wright	4–11 (l)

=== PDC team finals: 8 (6 titles) ===
Outcome	No.	Year	Championship	Team	Teammate	Opponents in the final	Score
Winner	1.	1996	World Team Championship	—N/a	Bob Anderson	Chris Mason and Steve Raw	18–15 (l)
Runner-up	1.	2007	World Darts Challenge	—N/a	Ray Carver	(Netherlands) Raymond van Barneveld and (United States) John Kuczynski	11–14 (l)
Winner	2.	2009	Jocky Wilson Cup	—N/a	James Wade	Gary Anderson and Robert Thornton	6–0 (p)
Winner	3.	2012	World Cup of Darts	England	Adrian Lewis	Australia – Simon Whitlock and Paul Nicholson	4–3 (m)
Winner	4.	2013	World Cup of Darts (2)	England	Adrian Lewis	Belgium – Kim Huybrechts and Ronny Huybrechts	3–1 (m)
Runner-up	2.	2014	World Cup of Darts	England	Adrian Lewis	Netherlands – Michael van Gerwen and Raymond van Barneveld	0–3 (m)
Winner	5.	2015	World Cup of Darts (3)	England	Adrian Lewis	Scotland – Gary Anderson and Peter Wright	3–2 (m)
Winner	6.	2016	World Cup of Darts (4)	England	Adrian Lewis	Netherlands – Michael van Gerwen and Raymond van Barneveld	3–2 (m)

=== Seniors finals: 2 ===
Outcome	No.	Year	Championship	Opponent	Score
Runner-up	1.	2022	World Seniors Masters	(Canada) David Cameron	3–6 (s)
Runner-up	2.	2022	World Seniors Matchplay	(Scotland) Robert Thornton	10–12 (l)

== Performance timelines ==
Performance Table Legend
W	Won the tournament	F	Finalist	SF	Semifinalist	QF	Quarterfinalist	#R; RR; Prel.	Lost in # round Round-robin; Preliminary round	DQ	Disqualified
DNQ	Did not qualify	DNP	Did not participate	WD	Withdrew	NH	Tournament not held	#R; RR; Prel.	Lost in # round Round-robin; Preliminary round	NYF	Not yet founded

CH= County Heats, CF= County Finals

=== BDO ===
Tournament	1988	1989	1990	1991	1992	1993	1997	2005	2006	2007
BDO Ranked televised events
BDO World Championship	DNQ		W	QF	W	2R	PDC			
World Masters	4R	SF	W	F	3R	DNP	PDC			
World Darts Trophy	Not held							DNP	W	F
International Darts League	Not held							DNP	QF	2R
Masters of Darts	Not held							W	NH	RR
British Matchplay	DNP			F	DNP		Not held			
British Professional	1R	Not held								
News of the World	CF	CH	CF	NH			W	NH		

WDF majors performances
Tournament	Event	Euro Cup 1990	World Cup 1991	Euro Cup 1992
WDF World Cup & WDF Europe Cup	Singles	W	QF	W
WDF World Cup & WDF Europe Cup	Pairs	W	L64	SF
WDF World Cup & WDF Europe Cup	Team	W	W	W
WDF World Cup & WDF Europe Cup	Overall	W	W	W

=== PDC Premier Events ===
Tournament	1994	1995	1996	1997	1998	1999	2000	2001	2002	2003	2004	2005	2006	2007	2008	2009	2010	2011		2012	2013	2014	2015	2016	2017	2018
PDC Ranked televised events
PDC World Championship	F	W	W	W	W	W	W	W	W	F	W	W	W	F	QF	W	W	QF		2R	W	2R	F	3R	QF	F
UK Open	Not held									W	QF	W	QF	QF	QF	W	W	5R		F	W	3R	QF	SF	DNQ	
World Matchplay	2R	W	2R	W	QF	SF	W	W	W	W	W	QF	W	SF	W	W	W	W		W	W	W	SF	F	W	(Note: resigned Tour Card and retired from professional darts after the 2018 PDC World Darts Championship.)
World Grand Prix	Not held				W	W	W	1R	W	W	1R	W	W	1R	W	W	SF	W		2R	W	QF	1R	1R	DNP	(Note: resigned Tour Card and retired from professional darts after the 2018 PDC World Darts Championship.)
European Championship	Not held														W	W	W	W		QF	2R	2R	QF	QF	DNQ	(Note: resigned Tour Card and retired from professional darts after the 2018 PDC World Darts Championship.)
Grand Slam of Darts (Note: A non-ranked event until 2015.)	Not held													W	W	W	QF	W		2R	W	W	F	QF	SF	(Note: resigned Tour Card and retired from professional darts after the 2018 PDC World Darts Championship.)
Players Championship Finals	Not held															W	SF	W	2R	W	F	QF	1R	DNQ		(Note: resigned Tour Card and retired from professional darts after the 2018 PDC World Darts Championship.)
PDC Non-ranked televised events																										(Note: resigned Tour Card and retired from professional darts after the 2018 PDC World Darts Championship.)
Premier League Darts	Not held											W	W	W	W	SF	W	SF		W	F	SF	5th	F	SF	
PDC World Cup of Darts	Not held																2R	NH		W	W	F	W	W	DNQ	
Masters	Not held																				W	SF	1R	SF	SF	
World Series of Darts Finals	Not held																						SF	SF	DNP	
Champions League of Darts	Not held																							W	SF	
PDC Past major events
Las Vegas Desert Classic	Not held								W	SF	W	W	SF	1R	W	W	Not held									
WSoD / US Open	Not held												W	W	W	Not held										
Championship League Darts	Not held														W	F	F	W		W	W	Not held				
Career statistics
Year-end ranking	4	1	2	1	3	2	4	2	1	1	2	2	2	1	1	1	1	1		1	1	2	3	4	6	NR

=== PDC World Series of Darts ===
Tournament	2013	2014	2015	2016	2017
World Series Finals	Not held		SF	SF	DNP
Dubai Darts Masters	QF	QF	F	SF	QF
Sydney Darts Masters	W	W	W	W	NH
Singapore Darts Masters	NH	QF	Not held		
Perth Darts Masters	NH	W	W	1R	QF
Japan/Tokyo Darts Masters	Not held		W	QF	NH
Auckland Darts Masters	Not held		SF	QF	SF
Shanghai Darts Masters	Not held			SF	QF
Melbourne Darts Masters	Not held				W
German Darts Masters	Not held				F

== Head-to-head record ==
Only players who have featured in a major PDC or BDO final are listed.

Players who have been world champions are in boldface.
Won–Lost–Draw, in that order.

- (Netherlands) **Raymond van Barneveld** 61–18–4 (73.49%)
- (England) **Adrian Lewis** 55–17–2 (74.32%)
- (England) James Wade 51–14–6 (71.83%)
- (Australia) Simon Whitlock 41–7 (85.42%)
- (England) Ronnie Baxter 41–5 (89.13%)
- (Scotland) **Gary Anderson** 40–17–3 (66.67%)
- (England) Terry Jenkins 39–4–3 (84.78%)
- (England) Andy Hamilton 38–5 (88.37%)
- (England) **Dennis Priestley** 37–6–1 (84.09%)
- (England) Colin Lloyd 35–4–1 (87.50%)
- (Netherlands) **Michael van Gerwen** 34–26–2 (54.84%)
- (England) Wes Newton 32–2 (94.12%)
- (England) Kevin Painter 32–1 (96.97%)
- (England) Mervyn King 31–8–2 (75.61%)
- (Canada) **John Part** 31–6 (83.78%)
- (England) Wayne Mardle 29–3 (90.63%)
- (England) Mark Walsh 26–5 (83.87%)
- (England) **Steve Beaton** 26–2 (92.86%)
- (Netherlands) Roland Scholten 25–0–2 (92.59%)
- (Australia) Paul Nicholson 24–2 (92.31%)
- (England) Dave Chisnall 23–9 (71.88%)
- (Netherlands) Vincent van der Voort 23–4 (85.19%)
- (Scotland) **Peter Wright** 22–11–3 (62.86%)
- (Scotland) Robert Thornton 22–6 (78.57%)
- (England) Peter Manley 22–3 (88%)
- (Wales) **Mark Webster** 20–2 (90.91%)
- (England) Alan Warriner-Little 19–3 (86.36%)
- (England) Colin Osborne 19–2 (90.48%)
- (England) **Bob Anderson** 18–3 (85.71%)
- (Northern Ireland) Brendan Dolan 18–1 (94.74%)
- (Netherlands) **Jelle Klaasen** 14–3 (82.35%)
- (England) Wayne Jones 15–1 (93.75%)
- (England) Mark Dudbridge 14–1–1 (87.50%)
- (England) **Michael Smith** 12–3 (80.00%)
- (England) **John Lowe** 12–1 (92.31%)
- (Belgium) Kim Huybrechts 11–1–1 (84.62%)
- (England) Shayne Burgess 11–0 (100%)
- (Wales) **Richie Burnett** 10–1 (90.91%)
- (Netherlands) Co Stompé 10–1 (90.91%)
- (England) **Stephen Bunting** 9–1–1 (81.82%)
- (England) Rod Harrington 9–7 (60%)
- (England) **Andy Fordham** 7–0 (100%)
- (United States) Gary Mawson 6–1 (85.71%)
- (England) Darren Webster 6–2 (75%)
- (England) Dave Askew 5–1 (83.33%)
- (England) Darryl Fitton 5–1 (83.33%)
- (Austria) Mensur Suljović 5–1 (83.33%)
- (Wales) Barrie Bates 4–1 (80%)
- (England) Peter Evison 4–4 (50%)
- (England) Dave Whitcombe 4–1 (80%)
- (England) Robbie Green 4–0 (100%)
- (England) **Keith Deller** 4–0 (100%)
- (England) Colin Monk 4–0 (100%)
- (Wales) Martin Phillips 4–0 (100%)
- (England) **Martin Adams** 3–1 (75%)
- (England) Mike Gregory 3–1 (75%)
- (England) Stuart Kellett 3–1 (75%)
- (Scotland) **Jocky Wilson** 3–1 (75%)
- (England) **Eric Bristow** 3–0 (100%)
- (England) Cliff Lazarenko 3–0 (100%)
- (Netherlands) **Christian Kist** 3–0 (100%)
- (England) Alan Norris 3–0 (100%)
- (England) Kirk Shepherd 3–0 (100%)
- (Wales) **Gerwyn Price** 2–0 (100%)
- (England) Dean Winstanley 2–0 (100%)
- (England) **Ted Hankey** 1–1 (50%)
- (England) **Scott Waites** 1–1 (50%)
- (England) **Rob Cross** 0–1 (0%)

== High averages ==
Taylor had recorded the majority of the highest ever televised averages, but other players have since began to take several of these places. Taylor's highest ever average was achieved in round four of the 2010 UK Open, in which he averaged 118.66 in a 9–0 win over Kevin Painter. This stood until 2016 when Van Gerwen set a new world record of 123.40. Taylor had the World Championship record of 111.21 which he set in the 2002 event, but Van Gerwen raised it to 114.05 in 2017. Taylor holds the record for the highest average in a PDC World Championship final of 110.94 which he set whilst beating Raymond van Barneveld in 2009. In March 2015, Taylor recorded the highest ever losing average, as Van Barneveld beat him 7–4 in the Premier League with Taylor averaging 115.80. Taylor holds the highest tournament average with 111.54 set at the 2009 European Championship.

Phil Taylor televised high averages
Rank	Average	Date	Opponent	Tournament	Stage	Score
1	118.66	5 Jun 2010	Kevin Painter	2010 UK Open	Fourth round	9–0 (l)
2	118.14	1 Nov 2009	Gary Anderson	2009 European Championship	Quarter-finals	10–3 (l)
3	117.35	1 Mar 2012	Simon Whitlock	2012 Premier League Darts	League	8–4 (l)
4	116.10	3 May 2012	James Wade	2012 Premier League Darts	League	8–1 (l)
5	116.01	23 Apr 2009	John Part	2009 Premier League Darts	League	8–3 (l)
6	115.80	19 Mar 2015	Raymond van Barneveld	2015 Premier League Darts	League	4–7 (l)
7	115.62	7 Jun 2009	Mark Lawrence	2009 UK Open	Quarter-finals	10–0 (l)
8	115.51	6 Jun 2009	(England) Ken Mather	2009 UK Open	Fourth round	9–3 (l)
9	115.25	25 Feb 2016	Dave Chisnall	2016 Premier League Darts	League	7–5 (l)
10	114.99	17 Jul 2010	Barrie Bates	2010 World Matchplay	First round	10–6 (l)
11	114.65	9 Nov 2014	Christian Kist	2014 Grand Slam of Darts	Group stage	5–1 (l)
12	114.54	7 Jun 2008	Wes Newton	2008 UK Open	Fifth round	9–3 (l)

== Nine-dart finishes ==
Taylor has supplemented his accomplishments in televised tournaments by frequently achieving the perfect leg of darts- a nine-dart finish. The first time he achieved this was at the Winter Gardens in Blackpool, against Chris Mason in the televised World Matchplay Championship in 2002. He has achieved the feat 11 times on television (and 22 times overall), including four times in the UK Open at the Reebok Stadium, Bolton (2004, 2005, 2007, and 2008).

On 24 May 2010, in the final of the 2010 PDC Whyte & Mackay Premier League, Taylor became the first player in professional darts to hit two nine-dart finishes in a single match.

Phil Taylor's televised nine-dart finishes
No.	Date	Opponent	Tournament	Method	Prize
1	1 Aug 2002	Chris Mason	2002 World Matchplay	3 x T20; 3 x T20; T20, T19, D12	£100,000
2	5 Jun 2004	Matt Chapman	2004 UK Open	3 x T20; 3 x T20; T20, T19, D12	501 bottles of Budweiser
3	12 Jun 2005	Roland Scholten	2005 UK Open	3 x T20; 3 x T20; T20, T19, D12	501 bottles of Budweiser
4	8 May 2007	Raymond van Barneveld	2007 International Darts League	3 x T20; 3 x T20; T20, T19, D12	Opel Tigra Twin Top
5	9 Jun 2007	Wes Newton	2007 UK Open	3 x T20; 3 x T20; T20, T19, D12	£20,000
6	7 Jun 2008	Jamie Harvey	2008 UK Open	3 x T20; 2 x T20, T19; 2 x T20, D12	£25,000
7	24 May 2010	James Wade	2010 Premier League Darts	T20, 2 x T19; 3 x T20; T20, T17, D18	
8	24 May 2010	James Wade	2010 Premier League Darts	3 x T20; 3 x T20; T20, T19, D12	
9	16 Feb 2012	Kevin Painter	2012 Premier League Darts	3 x T20; T20, 2 x T19; T20, T17, D18	
10	23 Jul 2014	Michael Smith	2014 World Matchplay	3 x T20; 2 x T20, T19; 2 x T20, D12	
11	22 Aug 2015	Peter Wright	2015 Sydney Darts Masters	3 x T20; 3 x T20; T20, T19, D12	

== Career earnings ==
This includes money earned from all darts tournaments Taylor has participated in held by any darts organisation where the prize money is known. The money list rank covers both PDC and BDO players.

Year	Majors	Pro Tour	Other wins	Earnings	Money list rank
1988	0	0	1	£2,638	28th
1989	0	0	0	£1,300	21st
1990	2	0	8	£39,400	2nd
1991	0	0	2	£8,650	4th
1992	1	0	1	£29,250	1st
1993	0	0	1	£6,750	10th
1994	0	0	1	£15,850	4th
1995	2	0	0	£22,500	3rd
1996	1	0	3	£21,125	3rd
1997	3	0	2	£102,210	1st
1998	2	0	1	£31,000	2nd
1999	2	0	2	£106,775	1st
2000	3	0	1	£78,031	1st
2001	2	0	2	£69,347	1st
2002	4	2	3	£220,021	1st
2003	3	2	1	£116,850	1st
2004	3	3	3	£181,595	1st
2005	5	5	5	£317,608	1st
2006	6	4	1	£326,373	1st
2007	3	5	2	£343,796	1st
2008	8	13	2	£553,639	1st
2009	8	12	5	£769,639	1st
2010	6	6	2	£643,688	1st
2011	6	5	3	£587,571	1st
2012	5	3	4	£454,400	1st
2013	8	1	2	£799,522	1st
2014	2	3	2	£382,000	2nd
2015	1	2	3	£424,910	3rd
2016	2	1	2	£449,236	4th
2017	1	0	1		4th
Career	89	67	65	£7,143,612	2nd

As of 1 January 2020. Pro Tour events were not held until 2002.
