= World Series of Darts =

Series of darts tournaments

Tournament information
- Venue: Various
- Location: Various cities
- Country: Various countries
- Established: 2013
- Organisation(s): PDC
- Format: Legs
- Prize fund: £100,000 £450,000 (Finals)
- Month(s) Played: January–August; September (Finals)

Current champion(s)
- (England) Ross Smith (Winner of 2026 Finals)

The World Series of Darts is a series of darts tournaments organised by the Professional Darts Corporation.

Beginning in 2013, the World Series has comprised between two and seven tournaments across the world, where a mixture of the top-ranked PDC players take on local qualifiers in a knockout format. Since 2015, there has been a World Series of Darts Finals tournament held annually, which has taken place in September at the AFAS Live in Amsterdam every year since 2022.

== History ==
The World Series of Darts commenced in 2013 with the Dubai Duty Free Darts Masters. The goal of these series of tournaments was to make darts more popular across the globe. Later that year, the Sydney Darts Masters took place, which as well as including 8 top-ranked PDC players, also featured 8 players from Australia and New Zealand to take part in the tournament. In 2014, tournaments in Singapore and Perth were added to the series, although this would be the only year that Singapore was used for an event.

In 2015, both the Japan tournament (later renamed as Tokyo for the 2016 tournament) and Auckland were added. Also in 2015, the series culminated with the World Series of Darts Finals. In 2016, the PDC expanded into China with the addition of the Shanghai Darts Masters, and in 2017, both North America and Europe had their own tournaments with the US Darts Masters in Las Vegas, and the German Darts Masters in Düsseldorf, along with Melbourne in the Australian leg of the tour.

In 2018, Brisbane joined the fray and replaced Perth, whilst Dubai was excluded. It was also confirmed that Vienna, Austria would replace Glasgow as the host of the World Series Finals in 2018.

In 2019, it was announced that Cologne and Hamilton would host World Series events for the first time, with China being excluded. It was also confirmed that Amsterdam, Netherlands would replace Vienna as the host of the World Series Finals in 2019.

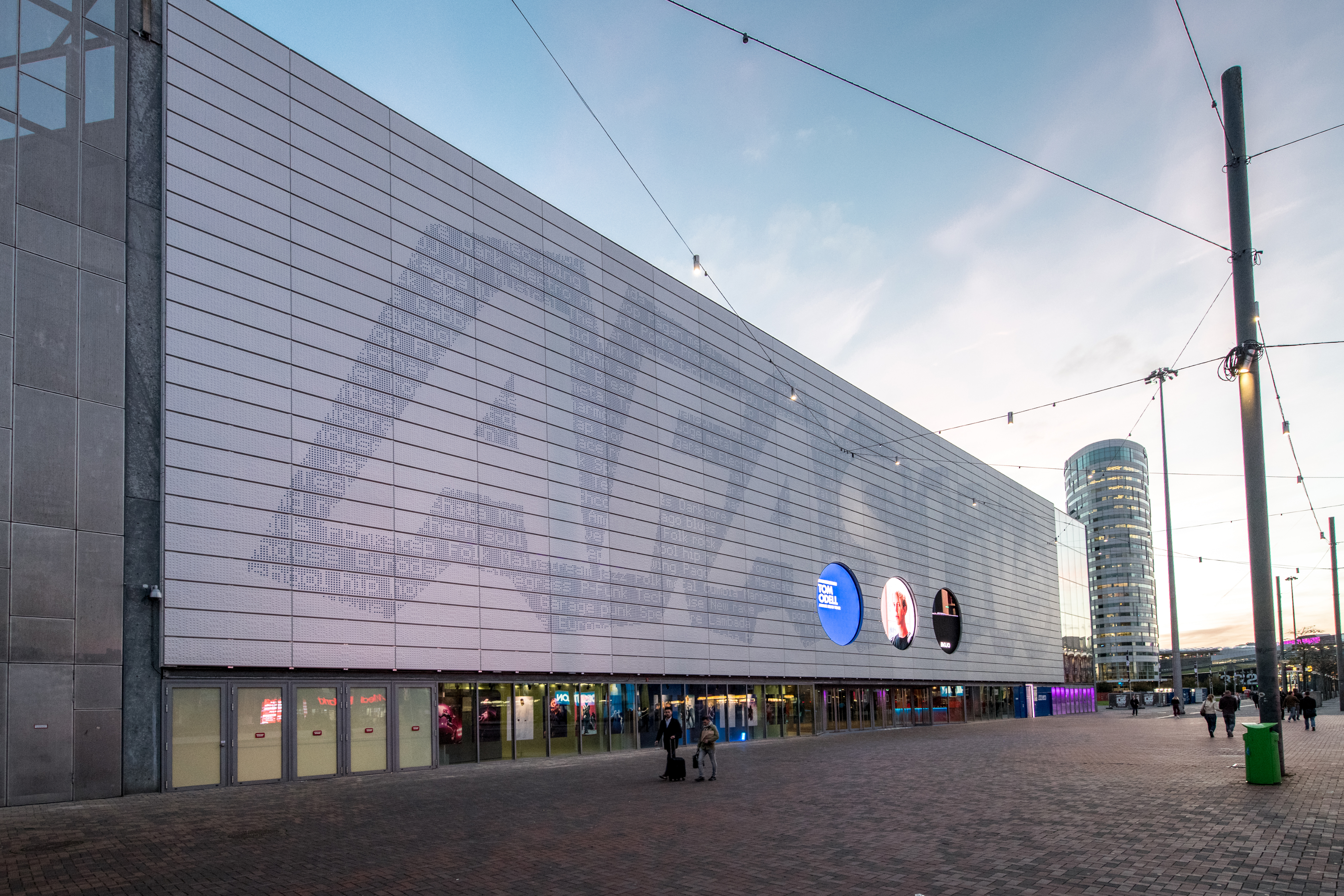
The AFAS Live in Amsterdam, the venue for the World Series of Darts Finals

In 2020, a new tournament, the Nordic Darts Masters, was due to take place in Copenhagen, Denmark. It was also confirmed that Salzburg, Austria would replace Amsterdam as the host of the World Series Finals. The Australian events were supposed to move to Wollongong and Townsville. However, all 2020 World Series events were cancelled due to the COVID-19 pandemic, with only the 2020 World Series of Darts Finals taking place.

The US Darts Masters relocated to New York City in 2022, having been due to move in 2020 before the cancellation of the 2020 US Masters. The events in Wollongong and Townsville were also held in 2022, but the only event in 2021 was the delayed Nordic Masters in Copenhagen, with the finals returning to Amsterdam in October 2021.

Since the return to full World Series schedules, five more events have been introduced: the Dutch Darts Masters in 2022, the Bahrain Darts Masters and Poland Darts Masters in 2023, the Australian Darts Masters in 2024 and the Saudi Arabia Darts Masters in 2026.

== Venues ==
Since the first tournament began in 2013, the World Series has visited eleven countries including the Finals.

Event	Venue(s)	First held	Last held	Upcoming	Current/last champion
(United Arab Emirates) Dubai Duty Free Darts Masters	Dubai Tennis Centre	2013	2017	None scheduled	(Scotland) Gary Anderson
(Australia) Sydney Darts Masters	Luna Park (2013); Hordern Pavilion (2014); Qantas Credit Union Arena (2015); The Star (2016)	2013	2016	None scheduled	(England) Phil Taylor
Singapore Darts Masters	Singapore Indoor Stadium	2014		None scheduled	(Netherlands) Michael van Gerwen
(Australia) Perth Darts Masters	HBF Stadium (2014–2015, 2017); Perth Convention and Exhibition Centre (2016)	2014	2017	None scheduled	(Scotland) Gary Anderson
Japan/Tokyo Darts Masters	Osanbashi Hall, Yokohama (2015); Yoyogi National Gymnasium (2016)	2015	2016	None scheduled	(Scotland) Gary Anderson
(New Zealand) Auckland Darts Masters	The Trusts Arena	2015	2018	None scheduled	(Netherlands) Michael van Gerwen
(China) Shanghai Darts Masters	Pullman Hotel Shanghai South	2016	2018	None scheduled	(England) Michael Smith
(United States) US Darts Masters	Tropicana Las Vegas (2017); Mandalay Bay, Las Vegas (2018–2019); The Theater, New York City (2022–)	2017	2026	None scheduled	(England) Luke Humphries
(Australia) Melbourne Darts Masters	Hisense Arena	2017	2019	None scheduled	(Netherlands) Michael van Gerwen
(Germany) German Darts Masters	Castello Arena, Düsseldorf (2017); Veltins-Arena, Gelsenkirchen (2018); Lanxess Arena, Cologne (2019)	2017	2019	None scheduled	(Scotland) Peter Wright
(Australia) Brisbane Darts Masters	Brisbane Convention & Exhibition Centre	2018	2019	None scheduled	(Australia) Damon Heta
New Zealand Darts Masters	Globox Arena, Hamilton (2019–2024); Spark Arena, Auckland (2025–)	2019	2026	None scheduled	(Wales) Jonny Clayton
(Denmark) Nordic Darts Masters	Forum Copenhagen	2021	2026	None scheduled	Michael van Gerwen
(Netherlands) Dutch Darts Masters	Ziggo Dome, Amsterdam (2022); Maaspoort, Den Bosch (2024)	2022	2025	None scheduled	(England) Rob Cross
(Australia) Queensland Darts Masters	Townsville Entertainment & Convention Centre	2022		None scheduled	(Netherlands) Michael van Gerwen
(Australia) New South Wales Darts Masters	WIN Entertainment Centre, Wollongong	2022	2023	None scheduled	(England) Rob Cross
Bahrain Darts Masters	Bahrain International Circuit, Sakhir (2023–2025); Exhibition World Bahrain, Sakhir (2026)	2023	2026	None scheduled	(Netherlands) Michael van Gerwen
Poland Darts Masters	Arena COS Torwar, Warsaw (2023); Gliwice Arena, Gliwice (2024–)	2023	2025	None scheduled	(Wales) Gerwyn Price
(Australia) Australian Darts Masters	WIN Entertainment Centre, Wollongong	2024	2026	None scheduled	(England) James Wade
Saudi Arabia Darts Masters	Global Theater, Riyadh	2026		None scheduled	(England) Luke Littler
World Series of Darts Finals	Braehead Arena, Glasgow (2015–2017); Multiversum Schwechat, Vienna (2018); AFAS Live, Amsterdam (2019, 2021–); Salzburgarena, Salzburg (2020)	2015	2026	None scheduled	(England) Ross Smith

== Points in the World Series tournament ==
Since the World Series of Darts Finals were announced in 2015, each event includes ranking points that all players earn dependent on how far they go to through each tournament. The top 8 ranked players automatically qualify for the Finals.

Stage	Points
Winner	12
Runner-up	8
Semi-final	5
Quarter-final	3
First round	1

== Event finals ==
Year	No.	Date	Event	Winner	Legs	Runner-up	Venue	Ref.
2013	1	23–24 May	(United Arab Emirates) Dubai Masters	(Netherlands) Michael van Gerwen	11 – 7	(Netherlands) Raymond van Barneveld	Dubai Tennis Centre	
2013	2	29–31 August	(Australia) Sydney Masters	(England) Phil Taylor	10 – 3	(Netherlands) Michael van Gerwen	Luna Park	
2014	1	29–30 May	(United Arab Emirates) Dubai Masters	(Netherlands) Michael van Gerwen	11 – 7	(Scotland) Peter Wright	Dubai Tennis Centre	
2014	2	15–16 August	Singapore Masters	(Netherlands) Michael van Gerwen	11 – 8	(Australia) Simon Whitlock	Singapore Indoor Stadium	
2014	3	22–24 August	(Australia) Perth Masters	(England) Phil Taylor	11 – 9	(Netherlands) Michael van Gerwen	HBF Stadium	
2014	4	28–30 August	(Australia) Sydney Masters	(England) Phil Taylor	11 – 3	(England) Stephen Bunting	Hordern Pavilion	
2015	1	28–29 May	(United Arab Emirates) Dubai Masters	(Netherlands) Michael van Gerwen	11 – 8	(England) Phil Taylor	Dubai Tennis Centre	
2015	2	27–28 June	Japan Masters	(England) Phil Taylor	8 – 7	(Scotland) Peter Wright	Osanbashi Hall, Yokohama	
2015	3	14–16 August	(Australia) Perth Masters	(England) Phil Taylor	11 – 7	(England) James Wade	HBF Stadium	
2015	4	20–22 August	(Australia) Sydney Masters	(England) Phil Taylor	11 – 3	(England) Adrian Lewis	Qantas Credit Union Arena	
2015	5	28–30 August	(New Zealand) Auckland Masters	(England) Adrian Lewis	11 – 10	(Netherlands) Raymond van Barneveld	The Trusts Arena	
2015	Finals	21–22 November	(Scotland) 2015 World Series of Darts Finals	(Netherlands) Michael van Gerwen	11 – 10	(Scotland) Peter Wright	Braehead Arena, Glasgow	
2016	1	26–27 May	(United Arab Emirates) Dubai Masters	(Scotland) Gary Anderson	11 – 9	(Netherlands) Michael van Gerwen	Dubai Tennis Centre	
2016	2	17–19 June	(New Zealand) Auckland Masters	(Scotland) Gary Anderson	11 – 7	(England) Adrian Lewis	The Trusts Arena	
2016	3	25–26 June	(China) Shanghai Masters	(Netherlands) Michael van Gerwen	8 – 3	(England) James Wade	Pullman Hotel	
2016	4	6–7 July	(Japan) Tokyo Masters	(Scotland) Gary Anderson	8 – 6	(Netherlands) Michael van Gerwen	Yoyogi National Gymnasium	
2016	5	18–20 August	(Australia) Sydney Masters	(England) Phil Taylor	11 – 9	(Netherlands) Michael van Gerwen	The Star	
2016	6	25–27 August	(Australia) Perth Masters	(Netherlands) Michael van Gerwen	11 – 4	(England) Dave Chisnall	Perth Convention and Exhibition Centre	
2016	Finals	5–6 November	(Scotland) 2016 World Series of Darts Finals	(Netherlands) Michael van Gerwen	11 – 9	(Scotland) Peter Wright	Braehead Arena, Glasgow	
2017	1	24–25 May	(United Arab Emirates) Dubai Masters	(Scotland) Gary Anderson	11 – 7	(Netherlands) Michael van Gerwen	Dubai Tennis Centre	
2017	2	6–7 July	(China) Shanghai Masters	(Netherlands) Michael van Gerwen	8 – 0	(England) Dave Chisnall	Pullman Hotel	
2017	3	14–15 July	(United States) US Masters	(Netherlands) Michael van Gerwen	8 – 6	(Northern Ireland) Daryl Gurney	Tropicana Las Vegas	
2017	4	11–13 August	(New Zealand) Auckland Masters	(Australia) Kyle Anderson	11 – 10	(Australia) Corey Cadby	The Trusts Arena	
2017	5	18–20 August	(Australia) Melbourne Masters	(England) Phil Taylor	11 – 8	(Scotland) Peter Wright	Hisense Arena	
2017	6	25–27 August	(Australia) Perth Masters	(Scotland) Gary Anderson	11 – 7	(Netherlands) Raymond van Barneveld	HBF Stadium	
2017	7	21–22 October	(Germany) German Masters	(Scotland) Peter Wright	11 – 4	(England) Phil Taylor	Castello Arena, Düsseldorf	
2017	Finals	3–5 November	(Scotland) 2017 World Series of Darts Finals	(Netherlands) Michael van Gerwen	11 – 6	(Scotland) Gary Anderson	Braehead Arena, Glasgow	
2018	1	25 May	(Germany) German Masters	(Austria) Mensur Suljović	8 – 2	(Belgium) Dimitri Van den Bergh	Veltins-Arena, Gelsenkirchen	
2018	2	6–7 July	(United States) US Masters	(Scotland) Gary Anderson	8 – 4	(England) Rob Cross	Mandalay Bay, Las Vegas	
2018	3	13–14 July	(China) Shanghai Masters	(England) Michael Smith	8 – 2	(England) Rob Cross	Pullman Hotel	
2018	4	3–5 August	(New Zealand) Auckland Masters	(Netherlands) Michael van Gerwen	11 – 4	(Netherlands) Raymond van Barneveld	The Trusts Arena	
2018	5	10–12 August	(Australia) Melbourne Masters	(Scotland) Peter Wright	11 – 8	(England) Michael Smith	Hisense Arena	
2018	6	17–19 August	(Australia) Brisbane Masters	(England) Rob Cross	11 – 6	(Netherlands) Michael van Gerwen	Brisbane Convention & Exhibition Centre	
2018	Finals	2–4 November	(Austria) 2018 World Series of Darts Finals	(England) James Wade	11 – 10	(England) Michael Smith	Multiversum Schwechat, Vienna	
2019	1	4–5 July	(United States) US Masters	(England) Nathan Aspinall	8 – 4	(England) Michael Smith	Mandalay Bay, Las Vegas	
2019	2	12–13 July	(Germany) German Masters	(Scotland) Peter Wright	8 – 6	(Germany) Gabriel Clemens	LANXESS arena, Cologne	
2019	3	9–10 August	(Australia) Brisbane Masters	(Australia) Damon Heta	8 – 7	(England) Rob Cross	Brisbane Convention & Exhibition Centre	
2019	4	16–17 August	(Australia) Melbourne Masters	(Netherlands) Michael van Gerwen	8 – 3	(Northern Ireland) Daryl Gurney	Melbourne Arena	
2019	5	23–24 August	New Zealand Masters	(Netherlands) Michael van Gerwen	8 – 1	(Netherlands) Raymond van Barneveld	Claudelands Arena, Hamilton	
2019	Finals	1–3 November	(Netherlands) 2019 World Series of Darts Finals	(Netherlands) Michael van Gerwen	11 – 2	(Netherlands) Danny Noppert	AFAS Live, Amsterdam	
2020	Finals	18–20 September	(Austria) 2020 World Series of Darts Finals	(Wales) Gerwyn Price	11 – 9	(England) Rob Cross	Salzburgarena, Salzburg	
2021	1	17–18 September	(Denmark) Nordic Masters	(Netherlands) Michael van Gerwen	11 – 7	(England) Fallon Sherrock	Forum Copenhagen, Copenhagen	
2021	Finals	29–31 October	(Netherlands) 2021 World Series of Darts Finals	(Wales) Jonny Clayton	11 – 6	(Belgium) Dimitri Van den Bergh	AFAS Live, Amsterdam	
2022	1	3–4 June	(United States) US Masters	(England) Michael Smith	8 – 4	(Netherlands) Michael van Gerwen	Hulu Theater, New York City	
2022	2	10–11 June	(Denmark) Nordic Masters	(Belgium) Dimitri Van den Bergh	11 – 5	(Scotland) Gary Anderson	Forum Copenhagen, Copenhagen	
2022	3	24–25 June	(Netherlands) Dutch Masters	(Belgium) Dimitri Van den Bergh	8 – 2	(Netherlands) Dirk van Duijvenbode	Ziggo Dome, Amsterdam	
2022	4	12–13 August	(Australia) Queensland Masters	(Netherlands) Michael van Gerwen	8 – 5	(Wales) Gerwyn Price	Townsville Entertainment and Convention Centre	
2022	5	19–20 August	(Australia) New South Wales Masters	(Wales) Jonny Clayton	8 – 1	(England) James Wade	WIN Entertainment Centre, Wollongong	
2022	6	26–27 August	New Zealand Masters	(Wales) Gerwyn Price	8 – 4	(Wales) Jonny Clayton	Globox Arena, Hamilton	
2022	Finals	16–18 September	(Netherlands) 2022 World Series of Darts Finals	(Wales) Gerwyn Price	11 – 10	(Netherlands) Dirk van Duijvenbode	AFAS Live, Amsterdam	
2023	1	12–13 January	Bahrain Masters	(England) Michael Smith	8 – 6	(Wales) Gerwyn Price	Bahrain International Circuit, Sakhir	
2023	2	20–21 January	(Denmark) Nordic Masters	(Scotland) Peter Wright	11 – 5	(Wales) Gerwyn Price	Forum Copenhagen, Copenhagen	
2023	3	2–3 June	(United States) US Masters	(Netherlands) Michael van Gerwen	8 – 0	(Canada) Jeff Smith	Hulu Theater, New York City	
2023	4	7–8 July	Poland Masters	(Netherlands) Michael van Gerwen	8 – 3	(Belgium) Dimitri Van den Bergh	Arena COS Torwar, Warsaw	
2023	5	4–5 August	New Zealand Masters	(England) Rob Cross	8 – 7	(England) Nathan Aspinall	Globox Arena, Hamilton	
2023	6	11–12 August	(Australia) New South Wales Masters	(England) Rob Cross	8 – 1	(Australia) Damon Heta	WIN Entertainment Centre, Wollongong	
2023	Finals	15–17 September	(Netherlands) 2023 World Series of Darts Finals	(Netherlands) Michael van Gerwen	11 – 4	(England) Nathan Aspinall	AFAS Live, Amsterdam	
2024	1	18–19 January	Bahrain Masters	(England) Luke Littler	8 – 5	(Netherlands) Michael van Gerwen	Bahrain International Circuit, Sakhir	
2024	2	26–27 January	(Netherlands) Dutch Masters	(Netherlands) Michael van Gerwen	8 – 6	(England) Luke Littler	Maaspoort, Den Bosch	
2024	3	31 May – 2 June	(United States) US Masters	Rob Cross	8 – 7	Gerwyn Price	Hulu Theater, New York City	
2024	4	7–8 June	(Denmark) Nordic Masters	Gerwyn Price	8 – 5	Rob Cross	Forum Copenhagen, Copenhagen	
2024	5	14–15 June	Poland Masters	Luke Littler	8 – 3	Rob Cross	Prezero Arena Gliwice, Gliwice	
2024	6	9–10 August	(Australia) Australian Masters	Gerwyn Price	8 – 1	Luke Littler	WIN Entertainment Centre, Wollongong	
2024	7	16–17 August	New Zealand Masters	Luke Humphries	8 – 2	Damon Heta	Globox Arena, Hamilton	
2024	Finals	13–15 September	(Netherlands) 2024 World Series of Darts Finals	Luke Littler	11 – 4	Michael Smith	AFAS Live, Amsterdam	
2025	1	16–17 January	Bahrain Masters	Stephen Bunting	8 – 4	Gerwyn Price	Bahrain International Circuit, Sakhir	
2025	2	24–25 January	(Netherlands) Dutch Masters	Rob Cross	8 – 5	Stephen Bunting	Maaspoort, Den Bosch	
2025	3	6–7 June	(Denmark) Nordic Masters	Stephen Bunting	8 – 4	Rob Cross	Forum Copenhagen, Copenhagen	
2025	4	27 – 28 June	(United States) US Masters	Luke Humphries	8 – 6	Nathan Aspinall	The Theater, New York City	
2025	5	4–5 July	Poland Masters	Gerwyn Price	8 – 7	Stephen Bunting	Prezero Arena Gliwice, Gliwice	
2025	6	8–9 August	(Australia) Australian Masters	Luke Littler	8 – 4	Mike De Decker	WIN Entertainment Centre, Wollongong	
2025	7	16–17 August	New Zealand Masters	Luke Littler	8 – 4	Luke Humphries	Spark Arena, Auckland	
2025	Finals	12–14 September	(Netherlands) 2025 World Series of Darts Finals	Michael van Gerwen	11 – 7	Luke Littler	AFAS Live, Amsterdam	
2026	1	15–16 January	Bahrain Masters	Michael van Gerwen	8 – 6	Gian van Veen	Bahrain International Circuit, Sakhir	
2026	2	19–20 January	Saudi Arabia Masters	Luke Littler	8 – 5	Michael van Gerwen	Global Theater, Riyadh	
2026	3	5–6 June	(Denmark) Nordic Masters	Michael van Gerwen	8 – 7	Luke Humphries	Forum Copenhagen, Copenhagen	
2026	4	25–26 June	(United States) US Masters	Luke Humphries	8 – 7	Luke Littler	The Theater, New York City	
2026	5	14–15 August	New Zealand Masters	Jonny Clayton	8 – 4	Gerwyn Price	Spark Arena, Auckland	
2026	6	21–22 August	(Australia) Australian Masters	James Wade	8 – 5	Brody Klinge	WIN Entertainment Centre, Wollongong	
2026	Finals	17–20 September	(Netherlands) 2026 World Series of Darts Finals	Ross Smith	11 – 5	Gerwyn Price	AFAS Live, Amsterdam	

== Finalists ==
Up to and including the 2026 World Series of Darts Finals.

Rank	Player	Won	Runner-up	Finals
1	Michael van Gerwen	24	10	34
2	Phil Taylor	8	2	10
3	Gerwyn Price	6	7	13
4	Luke Littler	6	4	10
5	Gary Anderson	6	2	8
6	Rob Cross	5	7	12
7	Peter Wright	4	5	9
8	Michael Smith	3	4	7
9	Luke Humphries	3	2	5
10	Jonny Clayton	3	1	4
11	Dimitri Van den Bergh	2	3	5
11	Stephen Bunting	2	3	5
13	James Wade	1	3	4
13	Nathan Aspinall	1	3	4
15	Adrian Lewis	1	2	3
15	Damon Heta	1	2	3
17	Kyle Anderson	1	0	1
17	Ross Smith	1	0	1
17	Mensur Suljović	1	0	1
20	Raymond van Barneveld	0	5	5
21	Daryl Gurney	0	2	2
21	Dave Chisnall	0	2	2
21	Dirk van Duijvenbode	0	2	2
24	Corey Cadby	0	1	1
24	Mike De Decker	0	1	1
24	Danny Noppert	0	1	1
24	Fallon Sherrock	0	1	1
24	Gabriel Clemens	0	1	1
24	Jeff Smith	0	1	1
24	Simon Whitlock	0	1	1
24	Gian van Veen	0	1	1
24	Brody Klinge	0	1	1
Total Events		74	74	
