= 2016 World Series of Darts Finals =

2016 Ladbrokes World Series of Darts Finals

Tournament information
- Dates: 5–6 November 2016
- Venue: Braehead Arena
- Location: Glasgow
- Country: Scotland
- Organisation(s): PDC
- Format: Legs
- Prize fund: £155,000
- Winner's share: £30,000
- High checkout: 161 (Germany) Max Hopp

Champion(s)
- (Netherlands) Michael van Gerwen

The 2016 Ladbrokes World Series of Darts Finals was the second staging of the tournament, organised by the Professional Darts Corporation. The tournament took place in the Braehead Arena, Glasgow, Scotland, between 5–6 November 2016. It featured a field of 24 players.

Michael van Gerwen was the defending champion after beating Peter Wright 11–10 in last year's final. He defended his title this year by again beating Wright 11–9.

== Prize money ==
Position (no. of players)		Prize money (Total: £155,000)
Winner	(1)	£30,000
Runner-up	(1)	£15,000
Semi-finalists	(2)	£10,000
Quarter-finalists	(4)	£7,500
Last 16 (second round)	(8)	£5,000
Last 24 (first round)	(8)	£2,500

== Qualification and format ==
The top eight players from the six World Series events of 2016 are seeded for this tournament. They are:

- 2016 Dubai Duty Free Darts Masters
- 2016 Auckland Darts Masters
- 2016 Shanghai Darts Masters
- 2016 Tokyo Darts Masters
- 2016 Sydney Darts Masters
- 2016 Perth Darts Masters

In addition, eight players were invited as "global prospects", as were the next four highest ranked players from the PDC Order of Merit following the 2016 World Grand Prix on 9 October 2016. Another four places were awarded in a qualifying event that took place in Coventry on October 23, 2016.

The following players qualified for the tournament:

World Series Top 8
1. (Netherlands) Michael van Gerwen (winner)
2. (Scotland) Gary Anderson (second round)
3. (England) Phil Taylor (semi-finals)
4. (England) Dave Chisnall (semi-finals)
5. (England) Adrian Lewis (quarter-finals)
6. (England) James Wade (second round)
7. (Scotland) Peter Wright (runner-up)
8. (Netherlands) Raymond van Barneveld (second round)

PDC Order of Merit Qualifiers
- (Scotland) Robert Thornton (first round)
- (England) Michael Smith (first round)
- (Netherlands) Jelle Klaasen (first round)
- (Austria) Mensur Suljović (second round)

PDC Tour Card Qualifiers
- (England) Steve Beaton (first round)
- (Australia) Simon Whitlock (quarter-finals)
- (Northern Ireland) Brendan Dolan (first round)
- (England) Joe Murnan (first round)

Global Invitations
- (Belgium) Kim Huybrechts (second round)
- (Netherlands) Benito van de Pas (quarter-finals)
- (Wales) Gerwyn Price (second round)
- (Northern Ireland) Daryl Gurney (second round)
- (England) Joe Cullen (quarter-finals)
- (Spain) Cristo Reyes (second round)
- (Germany) Max Hopp (first round)
- (England) Josh Payne (first round)

== Draw ==
First round (best of 11 legs); 5 November
WC	(Wales) Gerwyn Price 97.20	6
Q	(England) Steve Beaton 97.59	3
Q	(Australia) Simon Whitlock 93.34	6
Q	(Northern Ireland) Brendan Dolan 92.15	5
WC	(Spain) Cristo Reyes 97.02	6
WC	(Germany) Max Hopp 91.58	5
RQ	(Netherlands) Jelle Klaasen 95.24	5
WC	(Belgium) Kim Huybrechts 100.80	6
WC	(England) Joe Cullen 92.85	6
Q	(England) Joe Murnan 93.38	5
WC	(Northern Ireland) Daryl Gurney 94.36	6
WC	(England) Josh Payne 83.36	3
RQ	(England) Michael Smith 83.95	3
WC	(Netherlands) Benito van de Pas 94.95	6
RQ	(Austria) Mensur Suljović 102.48	6
RQ	(Scotland) Robert Thornton 96.96	0

Second round (best of 11 legs); 5 November
1	(Netherlands) Michael van Gerwen 98.82	6
WC	(Wales) Gerwyn Price 87.04	5
8	(Netherlands) Raymond van Barneveld 87.10	2
Q	(Australia) Simon Whitlock 95.80	6
5	(England) Adrian Lewis 94.29	6
WC	(Spain) Cristo Reyes 90.32	3
4	(England) Dave Chisnall 112.94	6
WC	(Belgium) Kim Huybrechts 103.59	4
2	(Scotland) Gary Anderson 97.20	5
WC	(England) Joe Cullen 96.35	6
7	(Scotland) Peter Wright 98.98	6
WC	(Northern Ireland) Daryl Gurney 97.43	3
6	(England) James Wade 97.17	5
WC	(Netherlands) Benito van de Pas 96.20	6
3	(England) Phil Taylor 100.56	6
RQ	(Austria) Mensur Suljović 94.04	3

Quarter-finals (best of 19 legs); 6 November
1	(Netherlands) Michael van Gerwen 109.71	10
Q	(Australia) Simon Whitlock 92.93	0
5	(England) Adrian Lewis 92.46	6
4	(England) Dave Chisnall 100.86	10
WC	(England) Joe Cullen 93.50	7
7	(Scotland) Peter Wright 99.83	10
WC	(Netherlands) Benito van de Pas 94.43	3
3	(England) Phil Taylor 103.85	10

Semi-finals (best of 21 legs); 6 November
1	(Netherlands) Michael van Gerwen 108.69	11
4	(England) Dave Chisnall 94.68	3
7	(Scotland) Peter Wright 105.03	11
3	(England) Phil Taylor 107.34	10

Final (best of 21 legs); 6 November
1	(Netherlands) Michael van Gerwen 101.18	11
7	(Scotland) Peter Wright 99.63	9
