= 2016 World Series of Darts =

The 2016 World Series of Darts was a series of non-televised darts tournaments organised by the Professional Darts Corporation. There were 6 World Series events and one Final event being held – one in the United Arab Emirates, one in New Zealand, one in China, one in Japan, two in Australia, with the finals being held in Scotland.

== Prize money ==
Stage (num. of players)		Prize money
Winner	(1)	£65,000
Runner-up	(1)	£40,000
Semi-finalists	(2)	£30,000
Quarter-finalists	(4)	£20,000
First round losers	(8)	£10,000
Total	£165,000	

== World Series events ==
No.	Date	Event	Venue	Winner	Legs	Runner-up	Ref.
1	26–27 May	Dubai Masters	(United Arab Emirates) Dubai, Dubai Tennis Centre	Gary Anderson (Scotland)	11–9	(Netherlands) Michael van Gerwen	
2	17–19 June	Auckland Masters	(New Zealand) Auckland, The Trusts Arena	Gary Anderson (Scotland)	11–7	(England) Adrian Lewis	
3	25–26 June	Shanghai Masters	(China) Shanghai, Pullman Hotel	Michael van Gerwen (Netherlands)	8–3	(England) James Wade	
4	6–7 July	Tokyo Masters	(Japan) Tokyo, Yoyogi National Gymnasium	Gary Anderson (Scotland)	8–6	(Netherlands) Michael van Gerwen	
5	18–20 August	Sydney Masters	(Australia) Sydney, The Star	Phil Taylor (England)	11–9	(Netherlands) Michael van Gerwen	
6	25–27 August	Perth Masters	(Australia) Perth, Perth Convention and Exhibition Centre	Michael van Gerwen (Netherlands)	11–4	(England) Dave Chisnall	
7	5–6 November	World Series of Darts Finals	(Scotland) Glasgow, Braehead Arena	Michael van Gerwen (Netherlands)	11–9	(Scotland) Peter Wright	

== World Series qualifiers ==
Auckland Masters
- (New Zealand) Warren Parry
- (New Zealand) Cody Harris
- (Australia) Damon Heta
- (New Zealand) Rob Szabo
- (New Zealand) Ken Moir
- (Australia) Tic Bridge
- (New Zealand) Bernie Smith
- (New Zealand) Stuart Leach

Shanghai Masters
- (China) Yuanjun Liu
- (China) Shiyan Lai
- (China) Lihao Wen
- (China) Jianhua Shen

Tokyo Masters
- (Japan) Keita Ono
- (Japan) Haruki Muramatsu
- (Japan) Masahiro Hiraga
- (Japan) Seigo Asada
- (Japan) Masumi Chino
- (Japan) Tsuneki Zaha
- (Japan) Shintaro Inoue
- (Japan) Chikara Fujimori

Sydney Masters
- (Australia) Simon Whitlock
- (Australia) Kyle Anderson
- (Australia) David Platt
- (Australia) Corey Cadby
- (New Zealand) Rob Szabo
- (Australia) Rhys Mathewson
- (New Zealand) Cody Harris
- (Australia) Harley Kemp

Perth Masters
- (Australia) Simon Whitlock
- (Australia) Kyle Anderson
- (Australia) Corey Cadby
- (Australia) Adam Rowe
- (Australia) Kim Lewis
- (Australia) David Platt
- (New Zealand) Rob Szabo
- (New Zealand) Koha Kokiri

== Quarter-finalists ==
Player	Dubai	Auckland	Shanghai	Tokyo	Sydney	Perth	Finals
(Netherlands) Michael van Gerwen	Runner up	Quarter-finalist	Winner	Runner up	Runner up	Winner	Winner
(Scotland) Gary Anderson	Winner	Winner	Quarter-finalist	Winner	Quarter-finalist	Quarter-finalist	Second round (16)
(England) Phil Taylor	Semi-finalist	Quarter-finalist	Semi-finalist	Quarter-finalist	Winner	First round	Semi-finalist
(England) Dave Chisnall	Semi-finalist	Quarter-finalist	Semi-finalist	Quarter-finalist	Semi-finalist	Runner up	Semi-finalist
(England) Adrian Lewis	Quarter-finalist	Runner up	Quarter-finalist	Semi-finalist	Quarter-finalist	Quarter-finalist	Quarter-finalist
(England) James Wade	Quarter-finalist	Semi-finalist	Runner up	Semi-finalist	First round	Quarter-finalist	Second round (16)
(Scotland) Peter Wright	Quarter-finalist	Quarter-finalist	Quarter-finalist	Quarter-finalist	Semi-finalist	Semi-finalist	Runner up
(Netherlands) Raymond van Barneveld	Quarter-finalist	Semi-finalist	Quarter-finalist	Quarter-finalist	First round	Semi-finalist	Second round (16)
(Australia) Kyle Anderson	Did not qualify	Did not qualify	Did not qualify	Did not qualify	Quarter-finalist	First round	Did not qualify
(Australia) Rhys Mathewson	Did not qualify	Did not qualify	Did not qualify	Did not qualify	Quarter-finalist	Did not qualify	Did not qualify
(Australia) Corey Cadby	Did not qualify	Did not qualify	Did not qualify	Did not qualify	First round	Quarter-finalist	Did not qualify
(Australia) Simon Whitlock	Did not qualify	Did not qualify	Did not qualify	Did not qualify	First round	First round	Quarter-finalist
(England) Joe Cullen	Did not qualify	Did not qualify	Did not qualify	Did not qualify	Did not qualify	Did not qualify	Quarter-finalist
(Netherlands) Benito van de Pas	Did not qualify	Did not qualify	Did not qualify	Did not qualify	Did not qualify	Did not qualify	Quarter-finalist
