= 2016 Sydney Darts Masters =

Tournament information
- Dates: 18–20 August 2016
- Venue: The Star
- Location: Sydney
- Country: Australia
- Organisation(s): PDC
- Format: Legs; Final - best of 21 legs
- High checkout: 160 (Australia) Kyle Anderson (x2)

Champion(s)
- (England) Phil Taylor

The 2016 Sydney Darts Masters was the fourth staging of the tournament by the Professional Darts Corporation, as a fifth entry in the 2016 World Series of Darts. The tournament featured 16 players (eight top PDC Players facing eight regional qualifiers) and was held at The Star in Sydney, Australia from 18–20 August 2016.

Phil Taylor was the three-time defending champion after defeating Adrian Lewis 11–3 in the last year's final, and he defended his title by beating Michael van Gerwen 11—9 in the final.

== Qualifiers ==
The eight seeded PDC players were:

1. (Scotland) Gary Anderson (quarter-finals)
2. (Netherlands) Michael van Gerwen (runner-up)
3. (England) James Wade (first round)
4. (England) Adrian Lewis (quarter-finals)
5. (England) Phil Taylor (winner)
6. (England) Dave Chisnall (semi-finals)
7. (Netherlands) Raymond van Barneveld (first round)
8. (Scotland) Peter Wright (semi-finals)

The Oceanic qualifiers were:

- (Australia) Simon Whitlock (first round)
- (Australia) Kyle Anderson (quarter-finals)
- (Australia) David Platt (first round)
- (Australia) Corey Cadby (first round)
- (New Zealand) Rob Szabo (first round)
- (Australia) Rhys Mathewson (quarter-finals)
- (New Zealand) Cody Harris (first round)
- (Australia) Harley Kemp (first round)

== Draw ==
First round (best of 11 legs); 18 August
1	(Scotland) Gary Anderson 79.64	6
(Australia) David Platt 74.77	3
(England) Phil Taylor 95.06	6
(Australia) Corey Cadby 92.24	3
4	(England) Adrian Lewis 93.13	6
(New Zealand) Rob Szabo 87.75	3
(England) Dave Chisnall 90.38	6
(Australia) Harley Kemp 80.94	1
2	(Netherlands) Michael van Gerwen 107.89	6
(New Zealand) Cody Harris 87.36	2
(Netherlands) Raymond van Barneveld 91.04	1
(Australia) Kyle Anderson 99.54	6
3	(England) James Wade 88.53	5
(Australia) Rhys Mathewson 84.49	6
(Scotland) Peter Wright 99.51	6
(Australia) Simon Whitlock 92.00	2

Quarter-finals (best of 19 legs); 19 August
1	(Scotland) Gary Anderson 98.09	2
(England) Phil Taylor 112.41	10
4	(England) Adrian Lewis 91.15	5
(England) Dave Chisnall 96.56	10
2	(Netherlands) Michael van Gerwen 104.07	10
(Australia) Kyle Anderson 97.43	6
(Australia) Rhys Mathewson 91.17	4
(Scotland) Peter Wright 95.60	10

Semi-finals (best of 21 legs); 20 August
(England) Phil Taylor 102.47	11
(England) Dave Chisnall 91.81	4
2	(Netherlands) Michael van Gerwen 105.92	11
(Scotland) Peter Wright 99.82	6

Final (best of 21 legs); 20 August
(England) Phil Taylor 105.13	11
2	(Netherlands) Michael van Gerwen 104.32	9

== Broadcasting ==
The tournament was available in the following countries on these channels:

Country	Channel
Australia	Fox Sports
New Zealand	Sky Sport (New Zealand)
Asia	Fox Channel Asia
United Kingdom	ITV4 (delayed coverage)
Netherlands	RTL 7 (delayed coverage)
Middle East/North Africa	OSN
(Republic of Ireland) Ireland	Setanta Sports
China	PPTV (online)
