= 2016 Shanghai Darts Masters =

Tournament information
- Dates: 25–26 June 2016
- Venue: Pullman Hotel Shanghai South
- Location: Shanghai
- Country: China
- Organisation(s): PDC
- Format: Legs; Final – best of 15 legs
- High checkout: 161 Raymond van Barneveld

Champion(s)
- (Netherlands) Michael van Gerwen

The 2016 Shanghai Darts Masters was the inaugural staging of the tournament by the Professional Darts Corporation, as a third entry in the 2016 World Series of Darts. The tournament featured eight Asian players who facing eight PDC players and was held at the Pullman Hotel Shanghai South in Shanghai, China from 25–26 June 2016.

Michael van Gerwen won the title, defeating James Wade 8–3 in the final.

== Qualifiers ==
The four seeded PDC players were:

1. (Scotland) Gary Anderson (quarter-finals)
2. (Netherlands) Michael van Gerwen (winner)
3. (England) Adrian Lewis (quarter-finals)
4. (England) Phil Taylor (semi-finals)

The next four seeded PDC players were (drawn at random into seeded side of the draw):

- (England) James Wade (runner-up)
- (England) Dave Chisnall (semi-finals)
- (Netherlands) Raymond van Barneveld (quarter-finals)
- (Scotland) Peter Wright (quarter-finals)

The following players were invited:

- (Singapore) Paul Lim (first round)
- (Hong Kong) Scott MacKenzie (first round)
- (Hong Kong) Royden Lam (first round)
- (China) Yunfei Jiang (first round)

The Chinese qualifiers were:

- (China) Yuanjun Liu (first round)
- (China) Shiyan Lai (first round)
- (China) Lihao Wen (first round)
- (China) Jianhua Shen (first round)

== Draw ==
First round (best of 11 legs); 25 June
1	(Scotland) Gary Anderson 93.94	6
(China) Yunfei Jiang 65.72	0
(England) James Wade 80.01	6
(China) Shiyan Lai 70.12	1
4	(England) Phil Taylor 107.76	6
(China) Yuanjun Liu 77.91	1
(Scotland) Peter Wright 89.41	6
(Hong Kong) Royden Lam 79.74	1
2	(Netherlands) Michael van Gerwen 96.24	6
(Singapore) Paul Lim 86.50	4
(Netherlands) Raymond van Barneveld 81.33	6
(China) Lihao Wen 76.67	2
3	(England) Adrian Lewis 81.98	6
(China) Jianhua Shen 62.86	0
(England) Dave Chisnall 83.45	6
(Hong Kong) Scott MacKenzie 60.86	2

Quarter-finals (best of 15 legs); 26 June
1	(Scotland) Gary Anderson 97.28	7
(England) James Wade 99.01	8
4	(England) Phil Taylor 100.47	8
(Scotland) Peter Wright 94.42	7
2	(Netherlands) Michael van Gerwen 98.16	8
(Netherlands) Raymond van Barneveld 100.86	4
3	(England) Adrian Lewis 94.69	6
(England) Dave Chisnall 97.23	8

Semi-finals (best of 15 legs); 26 June
(England) James Wade 98.79	8
4	(England) Phil Taylor 95.15	6
2	(Netherlands) Michael van Gerwen 101.36	8
(England) Dave Chisnall 93.85	5

Final (best of 15 legs); 26 June
(England) James Wade 94.69	3
2	(Netherlands) Michael van Gerwen 100.54	8
