= 2016 Tokyo Darts Masters =

Tournament information
- Dates: 6–7 July 2016
- Venue: Yoyogi National Gymnasium
- Location: Tokyo
- Country: Japan
- Organisation(s): PDC
- Format: Legs; Final – best of 15 legs
- High checkout: 161 (Scotland) Gary Anderson

Champion(s)
- (Scotland) Gary Anderson

The 2016 Tokyo Darts Masters was the second staging of the tournament (formerly known as the Japan Darts Masters) by the Professional Darts Corporation, as a fourth entry in the 2016 World Series of Darts. The tournament featured eight Japanese players who faced eight PDC players and was held at the Yoyogi National Gymnasium in Tokyo, Japan from 6–7 July 2016.

Phil Taylor was the defending champion, having won the inaugural staging of the Japan Darts Masters after defeating Peter Wright 8–7 in the final, but he lost 8–7 to James Wade in the quarter-finals.

Gary Anderson won the title after beating Michael van Gerwen 8–6 in the final.

== Qualifiers ==
The seeded PDC players were:

1. (Scotland) Gary Anderson (winner)
2. (Netherlands) Michael van Gerwen (runner-up)
3. (England) James Wade (semi-finals)
4. (England) Adrian Lewis (semi-finals)

The next four seeded PDC players were (drawn at random into seeded side of the draw):

5. (England) Phil Taylor (quarter-finals)
6. (England) Dave Chisnall (quarter-finals)
7. (Netherlands) Raymond van Barneveld (quarter-finals)
8. (Scotland) Peter Wright (quarter-finals)

The Japanese qualifiers were:

- (Japan) Keita Ono (first round)
- (Japan) Haruki Muramatsu (first round)
- (Japan) Masahiro Hiraga (first round)
- (Japan) Seigo Asada (first round)
- (Japan) Masumi Chino (first round)
- (Japan) Tsuneki Zaha (first round)
- (Japan) Shintaro Inoue (first round)
- (Japan) Chikara Fujimori (first round)

== Draw ==
First round (best of 11 legs); 6 July
1	(Scotland) Gary Anderson 96.08	6
(Japan) Seigo Asada 77.38	1
(Netherlands) Raymond van Barneveld 92.87	6
(Japan) Keita Ono 82.92	1
4	(England) Adrian Lewis 90.18	6
(Japan) Tsuneki Zaha 80.95	1
(Scotland) Peter Wright 92.97	6
(Japan) Chikara Fujimori 76.77	0
2	(Netherlands) Michael van Gerwen 93.24	6
(Japan) Masumi Chino 81.98	3
(England) Dave Chisnall 96.64	6
(Japan) Shintaro Inoue 84.81	1
3	(England) James Wade 88.90	6
(Japan) Masahiro Hiraga 77.07	1
(England) Phil Taylor 97.35	6
(Japan) Haruki Muramatsu 79.13	2

Quarter-finals (best of 15 legs); 7 July
1	(Scotland) Gary Anderson 103.00	8
(Netherlands) Raymond van Barneveld 95.90	3
4	(England) Adrian Lewis 98.96	8
(Scotland) Peter Wright 95.32	6
2	(Netherlands) Michael van Gerwen 101.91	8
(England) Dave Chisnall 99.43	6
3	(England) James Wade 101.71	8
(England) Phil Taylor 103.43	7

Semi-finals (best of 15 legs); 7 July
1	(Scotland) Gary Anderson 104.71	8
4	(England) Adrian Lewis 95.41	5
2	(Netherlands) Michael van Gerwen 101.67	8
3	(England) James Wade 91.45	3

Final (best of 15 legs); 7 July
1	(Scotland) Gary Anderson 103.72	8
2	(Netherlands) Michael van Gerwen 101.90	6
