= Gary Anderson (darts player) =

Scottish darts player (born 1970)

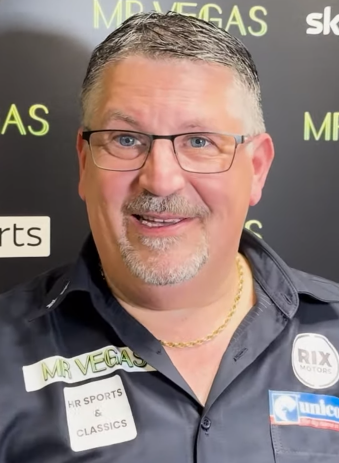
- Anderson in 2024

Personal information
- Nickname: "The Flying Scotsman"
- Born: 22 December 1970 (age 55) Musselburgh, Scotland
- Home town: Burnham-on-Sea, England

Sport
- Sport: Darts
- Playing since: 1996
- Darts: 23g Unicorn Signature
- Laterality: Right-handed
- Walk-on music: "Jump Around" by House of Pain

Organisation (see split in darts)
- BDO: 2000–2009
- PDC: 2009–present (Tour Card: 2011–present)
- Current world ranking: (PDC) 16 ▼2 (22 November 2026)

WDF major events – best performances
- World Championship: Semi-final: 2003
- World Masters: Quarter-final: 2003, 2005
- World Trophy: Winner (1): 2007
- Int. Darts League: Winner (1): 2007
- Finder Masters: Winner (2): 2007, 2008

PDC premier events – best performances
- World Championship: Winner (2): 2015, 2016
- World Matchplay: Winner (1): 2018
- World Grand Prix: Runner-up: 2016
- UK Open: Winner (1): 2018
- Grand Slam: Runner-up: 2011, 2018
- European Championship: Runner-up: 2015
- Premier League: Winner (2): 2011, 2015
- Desert Classic: Quarter-final: 2009
- PC Finals: Winner (1): 2014
- Masters: Runner-up: 2017
- Champions League: Winner (1): 2018
- World Series Finals: Runner-up: 2017

Other tournament wins
- Years
| PDC World Cup of Darts (Team event) | 2019 |
European Tour Events (×3)
| European Darts Grand Prix | 2024, 2025 |
| German Darts Championship | 2014 |
Players Championships (×30)
| 2009, 2010 (×3), 2011 (×5), 2014 (×5), 2015 (×2), 2016, 2017 (×3), 2018 (×3), 2020, 2023 (×3), 2024 (×2), 2025 |
UK Open Qualifiers (×6)
| 2010, 2011 (×2), 2014, 2016, 2018 |
World Series of Darts (×6)
| Auckland Darts Masters | 2016 |
| Dubai Darts Masters | 2016, 2017 |
| Perth Darts Masters | 2017 |
| Tokyo Darts Masters | 2016 |
| US Darts Masters | 2018 |

Other achievements
- 2012, 2015 PDC Pro Tour Player of the Year; 2015 PDC Player of the Year; 2015 PDC Fans Player of the Year; 2015 PDPA Players' Player of the Year; 2016 PDC Player of the Year (shared with Michael van Gerwen); 2016 PDC Fans' Player of the Year

Gary Anderson (born 22 December 1970) is a Scottish professional darts player who competes in Professional Darts Corporation (PDC) events. He is ranked world number sixteen, having reached a peak ranking of world number two from 2015 to 2017; Anderson is also a former British Darts Organisation (BDO) and World Darts Federation (WDF) world number one. Nicknamed "the Flying Scotsman", he is a two-time, back-to-back PDC World Champion, having won the title in 2015 and 2016. Widely regarded as one of the greatest players in the history of the sport, Anderson is known for his heavy scoring and smooth throwing style.

Before switching to the PDC following the 2009 BDO World Championship, Anderson won four BDO major titles: the International Darts League, World Trophy and Finder Masters in 2007 as well as the 2008 Finder Masters. He defeated Phil Taylor 7–6 in the 2015 PDC World Championship final and Adrian Lewis 7–5 the following year, and was also a finalist in 2011, 2017 and 2021. He has won six other PDC major singles titles: the Premier League in 2011 and 2015, the Players Championship Finals in 2014 and the UK Open, World Matchplay, and Champions League in 2018. He was part of the Scotland team that won the 2019 PDC World Cup of Darts, alongside Peter Wright.

Anderson has also won 39 PDC Pro Tour events as of May 2025, putting him third on the all-time list behind Michael van Gerwen on 90 and Phil Taylor on 70. He has won 54 PDC titles overall.

== Career ==
=== Early career ===
Born in Musselburgh, Anderson began his career playing in British Darts Organisation events and won the second tournament he entered by claiming the 2001 Welsh Open with a defeat of John Walton. The win ensured he qualified for the following year's World Championship for the first time, where he suffered a first round defeat to Sweden's Stefan Nagy, going down 3–0. The following year, in the 2003 BDO World Darts Championship Anderson reached the semi-final stage before bowing out to eventual runner-up Ritchie Davies. Anderson would not win another match at the Lakeside Country Club until 2006, when he beat Gary Robson in the first round before again falling to the eventual finalist this time in Raymond van Barneveld in the second round.

In the following two years, Anderson was knocked out of the World Championship in the first round by Dutch players – in 2007, he lost to Albertino Essers, and in 2008, he was defeated by Fabian Roosenbrand.

=== Major successes and PDC switch ===
Anderson won the first major tournaments of his career by claiming the International Darts League and World Darts Trophy back-to-back in 2007. It was a significant achievement as he succeeded against fields comprising the top players and world champions from both the rival organisations: the Professional Darts Corporation and BDO. In the two events, he had victories against Wayne Mardle, Roland Scholten, Mervyn King, James Wade, Adrian Lewis, Mark Webster, John Part, Peter Manley, Andy Hamilton and Phil Taylor.

Shortly after his WDT title, his success continued by clinching the BDO British Open to add to his 2007 Scottish Open success. Anderson also won the Zuiderduin Masters two years in a row – the first of which was an unranked event, the second was the first championship since the tournament was elevated to the status of ranking major. Anderson finished 2007 as the WDF world number 1, while he later ended 2008 as the WDF world number 2 behind Scott Waites In 2008, Anderson won the German Open, Welsh Open and BDO International Grand Prix titles. He also won the Dutch Pentathlon in 2008, retaining the title in 2009, with a world record score of 502 points.

Between 2000 and 2008, Anderson represented Scotland at three WDF World Cups, four WDF Europe Cups, and five Six Nations Cup. With Scotland, Anderson lifted successive Six Nations Cups in 2002 and 2003, as well as winning the WDF Europe Cup four-man and overall team titles in 2002. In total, Anderson played thirty-two matches for Scotland, winning twenty-two of them.

After months of speculation, Anderson joined the PDC in early 2009. He made his PDC televised debut in an exhibition match at the Premier League Darts meeting in Cardiff, after Wayne Mardle had withdrawn with illness, and defeated John Part with a three-dart average of 107. He then qualified for the 2009 UK Open at the Reebok Stadium in Bolton, losing in the second round 6–4 to Paul Nicholson. On his PDC World Championship debut in 2010, Anderson defeated Jamie Caven 3–2 in the first round before losing 4–0 against Ronnie Baxter in the second round.

=== 2010 ===
In June 2010, Anderson reached his first ever PDC major final at the 2010 UK Open. He defeated Michael van Gerwen, Paul Nicholson, Mervyn King (who hit a nine-dart finish against Anderson), Andy Hamilton, and Tony Ayres before losing to Phil Taylor in the final 11–5.

At the 2010 World Matchplay he produced the first whitewash for six years with a 10–0 thumping of fellow Scot Robert Thornton during their first round encounter. His second round encounter was against Jelle Klaasen, with Klaasen winning 14–12.

Anderson qualified for the 2010 Grand Slam of Darts, and went into the tournament as the number six seed. Anderson defeated Mark Hylton, Mark Webster and Wayne Jones in the group stage to finish top of his group. In the second round he defeated Colin Osborne 10–3 to again play Jones in the quarter finals. Anderson led 15–12 before Jones took the last four legs to win the match 16–15.

Anderson represented Scotland along with Robert Thornton for the inaugural PDC World Cup of Darts in 2010. They entered the tournament in the second round as 4th seeds and beat Russia, paired by Anastasia Dobromyslova and Roman Konchikov, 6–2 to advance to the group stage, where they lost their opening group game to Wales pairing Mark Webster and Barrie Bates. Having recovered to secure victory against Bill Davis and Darin Young of the United States, Anderson and Thornton went out after defeat to Spain's Carlos Rodriguez and Antonio Alcinas.

=== 2011 ===
Anderson qualified for the 2011 World Championship as the number 11 seed and in the first round played Japan's Morihiro Hashimoto. Anderson won 3–0 in sets, taking all nine legs without reply, with an average of 103.23. In the second round he faced two-time world champion Dennis Priestley, winning 4 sets to 2. He then defeated Andy Smith in the third round (whilst setting his highest World Championship average of 108.39), Raymond van Barneveld in the quarter-finals, and Terry Jenkins in the semi-finals to ensure his place in the final against Adrian Lewis. Anderson was defeated 7–5 by Lewis, who also hit a nine-dart finish during the first set of the match. Despite the loss, Anderson's run ensured him a place in the 2011 Premier League as he had moved into the top four on the Order of Merit.

Anderson was the number two seed for the 2011 Players Championship Finals, and reached his second successive major final, where he played Phil Taylor. Anderson led 11–9, but Taylor checked out 128 in the deciding leg to win 13–12. In the Premier League he got off to a winning start by beating Simon Whitlock 8–5 on the opening night at the O2 Arena. He went on to win his first four games before losing to Taylor in week five. Anderson finished the group stage in third place and played Van Barneveld in the semi-finals, winning 8–6. In a repeat of the World Championship final he played Lewis (who had beaten Taylor 8–3 in the other semi-final) and beat him 10–4 to win his first major championship in the PDC, his third in total, and his first in the UK having had his previous successes in the Netherlands.

In the World Matchplay he was beaten 10–6 in his first round match against Andy Hamilton, and he lost in the second round of the European Championship 10–5 to Peter Wright. Away from the television cameras on the PDC Pro Tour he won four Players Championships during the year including both during the same weekend in Nuland. In the first round of the World Grand Prix he faced Richie Burnett and lost 2–1 in sets. Anderson qualified from Group C of the Grand Slam of Darts and then won through to the final where he met Taylor and was comfortably beaten 16–4. Anderson holds the record for the highest ever three dart average in darts history in an official tournament with a 133.35 average in a 6–1 win against Arron Monk in a UK Open Qualifier during 2011.

=== 2012 ===
Anderson survived a huge scare in the first round of the 2012 World Championship as his opponent Jyhan Artut had four darts to win the match. He missed and Anderson won the match 3–2 on a sudden-death leg. He used his lucky escape to his advantage by defeating Devon Petersen and Colin Lloyd, 4–2 and 4–1 respectively, to set up a quarter-final clash with Simon Whitlock. He won the first set of the match, but missed a total of 29 darts at a double and lost 1–5. He played in his second World Cup for Scotland in February, this time with Peter Wright and together they were beaten by South Africa in the second round, losing in a sudden-death leg.

Anderson had a disappointing defence of his Premier League title. He finished bottom of the league table having won just three matches from the 14-game season. In winning the event in 2011 he made a total of 79 180's, but could only manage 31 this year, the least of any of the eight players. However, in the last league game Anderson did have an encouraging 7–7 draw with Phil Taylor.

In June, he completed his first live televised nine-dart finish in a 9–3 third round win over Davey Dodds at the UK Open. He lost in the next round to compatriot, and eventual winner of the event, Robert Thornton 7–9. He was then forced to take a month away from the sport due to problems focusing with his left eye, returning to play in the World Matchplay. There he played Dean Winstanley in the first round and, despite leading 5–0, lost the match 11–13. Anderson was banned by the Darts Regulation Authority for two European Tour events and the European Championship due to "him failing to complete his match and his subsequent behaviour" at the European Tour Event 2. In October, he lost in the final of the 14th Players Championship of the year, 5–6 to Robert Thornton in an all Scottish final. Anderson then won the non-ranking Irish Masters by beating Colin Osborne 6–1 in the final. He finished second in Group F of the Grand Slam of Darts to qualify for the last 16, where he faced Andy Hamilton. Despite averaging almost 102, Anderson lost 9–10 in a thrilling match. After all 33 ProTour events of 2012 had been played, Anderson was 26th on the Order of Merit, inside the top 32 who qualified for the Players Championship Finals. He saw off Wes Newton and Robert Thornton, but was then beaten 8–10 by Simon Whitlock in the quarter-finals.

During the 2012 season, Anderson, together with the seven other players who competed in the Premier League recorded a charity single with Chas Hodges and his band called 'Got My Tickets for the Darts' which was written by Chas. It was released on 18 May, the night after the play-offs at the O2 in London, where it was premiered. Proceeds from the single were donated to the Haven House Children's Hospice.

=== 2013 ===
Anderson survived three match darts versus John Bowles in the second round of the 2013 World Championship to win in a deciding set, but was then comfortably beaten by Raymond van Barneveld 0–4 in 33 minutes as he missed a total of 23 darts at doubles. Because the ranking system works as a two-year rolling list based on prize money earned, Anderson lost the £100,000 from reaching the 2011 World Championship final and dropped to world number 11 after the tournament. Anderson partnered Robert Thornton for the third time at the World Cup of Darts and they were shocked by Spain 4–5 in the last 16. He threw a nine-dart finish in the third UK Open Qualifier during a first round win over Josh Payne, but lost in the following round 5–6 to Michael van Gerwen.

He qualified for the 2013 Premier League by virtue of being the 2011 champion. In the first eight matches he could only beat Phil Taylor and Simon Whitlock and went into the ninth week knowing he had to beat James Wade to have any chance of avoiding being one of the two relegated players from the 10-man league. Anderson lost 3–7 to Wade and stated afterwards that he has struggled with his game for the last year. At the UK Open he led Kevin Painter 7–3 in the fourth round, but then lost six consecutive legs to exit the tournament 7–9. Anderson showed his best darts in the first round of the World Grand Prix as he averaged 104.86 in the double start event during a two sets to nil 10-minute defeat of Jelle Klaasen. He then edged past Wes Newton 3–2 before meeting Phil Taylor in top form in the quarter-finals who beat Anderson 3–0. At the Grand Slam of Darts, Anderson produced two superb performances in the group stage as he averaged 107.14 and 111.80 in defeats of Wesley Harms and Peter Wright. He lost his other game to James Wade to finish second in the group and play Taylor in the last 16. Anderson again posted an impressive average of 106.13 (almost four points ahead of Taylor's), but from 4–4 was unable to capitalise on the chances his scoring set up and lost 10–5. Anderson's second major quarter-final of the year came at the Players Championship Finals where he lost 9–7 to Justin Pipe.

=== 2014 ===
Anderson comfortably beat Mark Dudbridge and Brendan Dolan in the 2014 World Championship to face Michael van Gerwen in the third round. He took advantage of a sluggish start from Van Gerwen to establish a 3–1 lead and also missed two darts to win the set he lost. However, Anderson's usual scoring power deserted him as he lost three sets in a row to exit the tournament. Anderson bemoaned the fact that he had been playing consistently well over the previous months but kept losing games he should win through silly mistakes. He then began the year by claiming his first ranking title in two and a half years at the German Darts Championship. Anderson recovered from 5–3 down to Justin Pipe in the final to win 6–5, surviving six match darts from his opponent in the process and said afterwards his goal for the year was to reclaim his ranking in the top eight. His good start to the year continued as he won the fifth UK Open Qualifier with a 6–2 defeat of Robert Thornton. At the UK Open itself he lost 9–7 to Ian White in the fifth round. Anderson's third title of the year came at the first Players Championship as he averaged 111.47 in beating Andrew Gilding 6–5 in a high quality final. Another tournament victory came a week later at the third event by edging out Phil Taylor 6–5, with Anderson describing afterwards that winning has become a habit again.

Anderson received a Sky Sports wildcard to participate in the Premier League this year. He had a fantastic second half of the season to win five of his last seven matches, drawing the other two, to finish fourth in the table and qualify for the play-offs. Anderson played Van Gerwen in the semi-finals against whom he lost to 7–5 and beat 7–4 during the league stage. There was never more than a leg between the players throughout the whole match with Van Gerwen throwing for it in the deciding leg. He kicked off with a 171 and Anderson could only reply with 17 and went on to lose 8–7. With doubling so often the weakness in Anderson's game, he managed to hit 43% during the whole season this year, the third highest out of the ten players. In June he won his fifth title of the season at the 11th Players Championship with a 6–2 defeat of Thornton.

At the World Matchplay, Anderson beat Jamie Caven 10–8 and Stephen Bunting 13–8 (whilst averaging 104.41) to progress past the second round for the first time in his sixth appearance in the event. In the quarter-finals he outplayed Adrian Lewis in winning 13–8 and was then involved in a high quality match against Phil Taylor in the semi-finals as both players averaged 105 which Anderson just lost 17–15. Anderson stated that the quality of his darts was beginning to scare other players again and his successful week took him back into the world's top 10. In September he averaged 115.62 in thrashing Lewis 6–0 in the semi-finals of the 13th Players Championship and then fought back from 5–3 down in the final against Richie Burnett to take the title 6–5. He also reached the final of the 16th event but lost 6–2 against Brendan Dolan. Anderson's successful season in the floor events concluded at the final Players Championship where he sealed the title by throwing a 10 dart leg to edge Peter Wright 6–5. He finished the season top of the Pro Tour Order of Merit and was therefore the number one seed for the Players Championship Finals, something Anderson said he had worked his heart out all year to achieve. He produced his very highest standard throughout the event beginning with a 6–5 win over Christian Kist with an average of 110.62. In the quarter-finals he beat Taylor for the first time since 2007 in a televised knockout match and then eliminated Vincent van der Voort 11–7 and Lewis 11–6 in the final. It was Anderson's fourth major title and he ended the tournament with an overall average of 104.72.

=== 2015: World Championship win ===
Anderson seemed to become frustrated with his first round opponent Scott Kirchner's playing style at the 2015 World Championship. Kirchner threw an imaginary dart before every visit to the board and Anderson struggled to a 3–1 win averaging 86.20. A much higher quality match followed against the fast throwing Jelle Klaasen in which Anderson recovered from 3–1 down to win 4–3, taking out a crucial 84 finish on the bull in the fifth set with Klaasen waiting on 89 for the match. Both players averaged over 100 with 20 180s thrown. More comfortable victories followed over Cristo Reyes (averaged 104.54) and the previous year's finalist Peter Wright (averaged 102.12) to set up a semi-final tie with Michael van Gerwen. Just like their meeting in the third round of 2014's event, Van Gerwen recovered from a 3–1 deficit to level at 3–3. However, he would miss four darts to gain a set lead for the first time in the match, with Anderson going on to take it 6–3. He finished with a checkout rate of 50% and averaged over 100 for the fourth game in a row.

Anderson held an early 3–1 advantage over Phil Taylor in the final, before the 16-time world champion won nine of the next ten legs to move 4–3 ahead. Taylor then missed three darts to take the next set, allowing Anderson to tie the scores at 4–4. In Anderson's first visit to the board at the beginning of the ninth set he hit two treble 20s, but his third dart knocked them out of the bed to score nothing. He lost the leg and became distracted by a member of the audience shouting out to be two legs down, before punishing more missed darts from Taylor to claim the set. Anderson stood one set away from the title when he made it 6–4, but Taylor quickly recovered to send the match into a deciding set. Taylor had three darts to hold his throw in the second leg, but could not find the target as Anderson took the final set without reply to win his first World Championship 7–6. The match broke the record for 180s in a PDC final with 32, beating the 31 thrown during the 2007 final. Anderson's total 180s during the whole tournament of 64 was also a record. The title saw him climb to world number three, his highest position to date. Later in the month he was crowned the PDC Player of the Year, Pro Tour Player of the Year, Fans' Player of the Year and Players' Player of the Year at the annual awards dinner.

==== Rest of season ====
At the Masters, following wins over Andy Hamilton, 10–2, and James Wade, 10–5, in which Anderson averaged 121 in the first five legs, he lost 11–6 to Raymond van Barneveld in the semi-finals. Anderson began his Premier League campaign with a 7–5 win over Phil Taylor. He was beaten 6–2 in the final of the German Darts Championship by Michael van Gerwen. From 8–4 ahead of Mervyn King in the third round of the UK Open, Anderson missed a total of 13 match darts to be defeated 9–8. In week six of the Premier League, Anderson secured a superb 7–1 win over Adrian Lewis, with a 109 average, and continued his form into that weekend by beating James Wade 6–5 to win the first Players Championship event of the year. On his first competitive return to Scotland as world champion, Anderson overcame Kim Huybrechts 7–5 in week seven of the Premier League. He missed double 12 for a nine darter in the last leg. After a 6–6 draw in week nine with Van Barneveld, with a 108 average, Anderson sat third in the Premier League table, with the first round of fixtures completed, and a total of six wins, one draw and 13 points from his first nine matches. After three defeats in his next five matches, Anderson secured his place in the Premier League play-offs with another 7–5 defeat of Phil Taylor in week 14. He finished the regular Premier League season beating Adrian Lewis 7–3 to finish in third. Anderson recorded nine wins, two draws and 20 points from 16 games. He lost 6–4 to Phil Taylor in the final of the ninth Players Championship.

Anderson rallied from 7–4 down to Dave Chisnall in the Premier League semi-finals to send the match into a deciding leg in which Chisnall missed three match darts, allowing Anderson to take out a 116 finish to beat him 10–9. Anderson defeated Van Gerwen 11–7 in the final to claim the second Premier League title of his career. He became the second player after Phil Taylor win to the World Championship and Premier League in the same year. Anderson made his World Series of Darts debut at the Dubai Masters, but lost to Phil Taylor at the semi-final stage. Anderson and Peter Wright teamed up at the World Cup of Darts as the number two seeds. After wins over Singapore, Hungary, and Hong Kong, they saw off the Dutch duo of Van Gerwen and Van Barneveld in a doubles match to ensure Scotland would play in their first final in the event. They faced England's Taylor and Lewis and were 2–1 down in the tie, before Anderson beat Taylor 4–1 which meant the winner of Wright against Lewis would claim the title, with Lewis triumphing 4–1. At the World Matchplay, Anderson beat Steve Beaton 10–4 in the first round before a surprise 13–9 second round defeat to Mensur Suljović, which ended his bid for the Triple Crown. Following the completion of the tournament, Anderson became the world number two for the first time in his career. He won his second Players Championship of the year at the final event by seeing off James Wade 6–2.

In the final of the European Championship, Anderson held a 10–7 advantage over Van Gerwen, but lost four legs in a row without getting a dart for the title as he was beaten 11–10. He averaged 104.22 against Mark Webster in the second round of the Grand Slam of Darts, but the Welshman took out 71% of his shots at doubles to defeat Anderson 10–6 and he lost in the same stage of the Players Championship Finals 10–4 to Daryl Gurney.

=== 2016: Second World Championship title ===
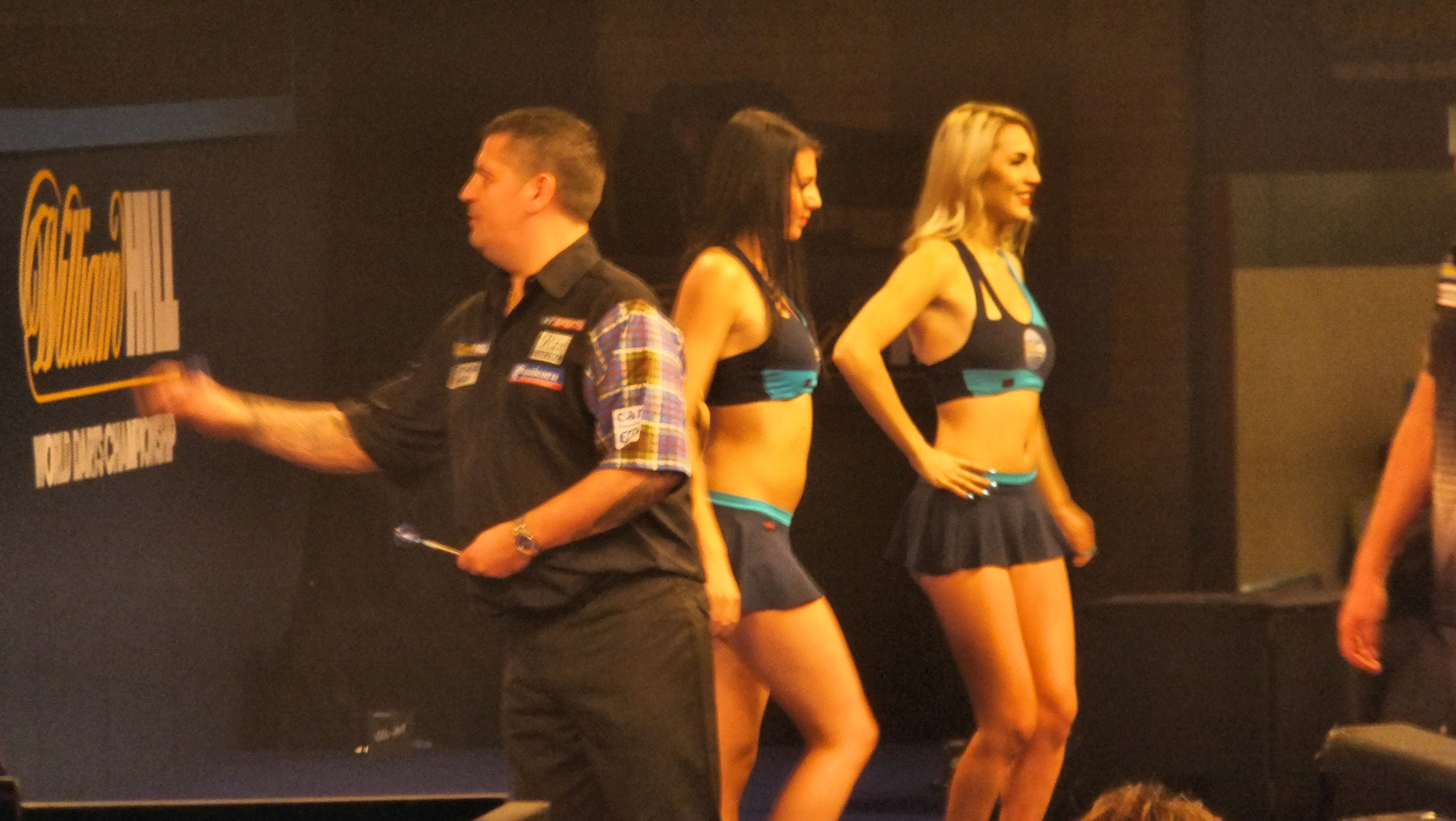
Anderson at the 2016 PDC World Championship

In the defence of his title, Anderson reached the final of the 2016 World Championship without facing any troubles following wins over Andy Boulton, Daryl Gurney, Vincent van der Voort, James Wade and Jelle Klaasen with the loss of just two sets. In the semi-finals, he won 6–0 over Jelle Klaasen with a 107 average and threw a nine-dart finish in the opening set. He played Adrian Lewis in a rematch of the 2011 final and hit a 170 finish in the penultimate leg, before hitting double 12 (the same double which he hit to win his first World Championship) to retain his title with a 7–5 win, a reversal of the scoreline from five years ago. 34 180s were thrown which is a record in a professional match. Anderson became the 11th player to win more than one World Championship and joined Eric Bristow, Raymond van Barneveld and Lewis in being the only players to have successfully defended their first world title.

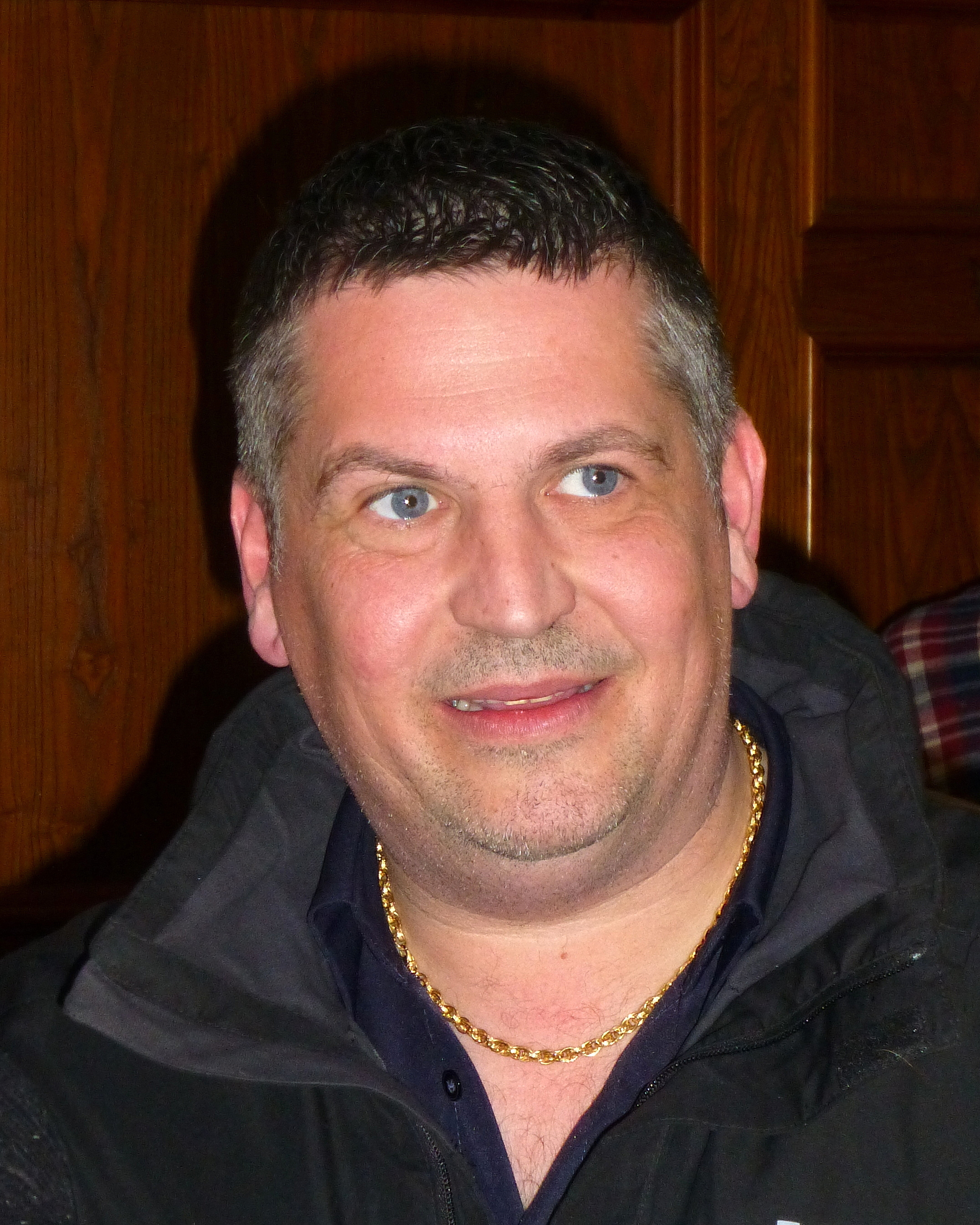
Anderson in March 2016

Anderson took the fourth UK Open Qualifier with a 6–1 victory over James Wade, but at the main event suffered a huge surprise fourth round loss as amateur Barry Lynn won 9–3. He finished third in the Premier League to qualify for the semi-finals and rallied from 8–4 down against Phil Taylor to trail by one leg, but would be beaten 10–7. Anderson had an exceptional year in the invitational World Series events as he claimed the Dubai Masters, Auckland Darts Masters and Tokyo Darts Masters. He reached the semi-finals of the World Matchplay for the second time, but lost 17–8 to Taylor. Anderson's second Pro Tour title of 2016 was the 12th Players Championship which he won by edging out Terry Jenkins 6–5.

Anderson's first major final after the World Championship came at the World Grand Prix which he got to without dropping more than one set against Jamie Caven, Kyle Anderson, Kim Huybrechts and Raymond van Barneveld. However, he was powerless to stop Michael van Gerwen from capturing the title with a 5–2 win. Anderson was whitewashed 6–0 by Wade in the first round of the European Championship, averaging just 77.40. In his next event, the World Series of Darts Finals, Anderson wore glasses on stage for the first time. He said after going for an eye test he could not believe he had won two world title without being able to see properly and also explained that he has had to change his throw after his old one would knock his glasses off. He did lose 6–5 to Joe Cullen in his first match wearing them, but reached the semi-finals of the Grand Slam where he was defeated 16–14 by Wade.

=== 2017 ===
In his quarter-final match with Dave Chisnall at the 2017 World Championship 33 180s were thrown, just one shy of the record. With the match tied at three sets apiece, Chisnall was ahead in the seventh set 2–0, but missed four darts to take it and Anderson would win 5–3. After Peter Wright equalised their semi-final at 3–3 after trailing 3–1, Anderson won nine of the next ten legs to reach the final for the third year in a row with a 6–3 victory. He was on a 17-game unbeaten streak at the event and missed two darts to take a 3–1 lead over Michael van Gerwen in the early stages of the final. Van Gerwen then won 12 of the next 14 legs in taking four sets in a row and, though Anderson pulled one back, his reign as world champion ended with a 7–3 loss. Anderson had not averaged over 100 in his two previous wins in the final, but averaged 104.93 in this defeat, as well as hitting 22 180s which is a record in a single match. The pair smashed the record for the most 180s in a match with 42 and Anderson's 71 for the entire tournament is also a record.

Anderson and Van Gerwen also met in the final of the Masters, with Anderson losing 11–7. He was level at 7–7 with Van Gerwen in the semi-finals of the Premier League, before being defeated 10–7. Anderson and Wright suffered a surprise first round 5–2 defeat to Singapore at the World Cup.

=== 2018: World Matchplay and UK Open champion ===
Anderson began his 2018 season with a loss to eventual runner-up Phil Taylor in the quarter-finals of the 2018 World Championship, failing to reach the final for the first time in 4 years.

With Rob Cross breaking into the top 3 in Order of Merit with his World Championship victory over Taylor, Anderson would start the 2018 season ranked 4th in the world. In the semi finals of the Masters, Anderson lost to Michael van Gerwen 11–5. Two weeks later Anderson won 2018 UK Open Qualifier 4. and entered the 2018 UK Open as the 6th seed. Having not reached the final since the 2010 UK Open, where he lost to Taylor, Anderson reached the final for a second time and defeated Corey Cadby 11–7. A week later, Anderson won back-to-back Pro Tour titles at in Players Championships 3 and 4.

In the 2018 Premier League, Anderson had an 8–5–3 (W–L–D) record to finish 3rd in the league table and reach the playoffs for the 5th year straight, but would fall to Michael Smith in the semi-final. Nevertheless, Anderson would turn around two days later to win his third Players Championship title of the year at PC11. Two, Anderson would partner Peter Wright for the fourth time, representing Scotland at the 2018 PDC World Cup of Darts. With the pair having only lost one set before the final, they fell to the reigning champions, The Netherlands team of Michael van Gerwen and Raymond van Barneveld, with Van Gerwen defeating Anderson 4–0.

Anderson defeated Rob Cross 8–4 in the final of the 2018 US Darts Masters where he hit the tournament high checkout of 164 in the final leg. The following week, he would suffer a first round defeat in the 2018 Shanghai Darts Masters, losing to Royden Lam 6–5 in a deciding leg.

Anderson returned to form at the 2018 World Matchplay, defeating Stephen Bunting 10–7 and Van Barneveld 11–9 before achieving a 19–17 victory over Joe Cullen in the quarter-finals, hitting a nine-dart finish which earned him £45,000.

Anderson met Mensur Suljović in the final. In the longest match in World Matchplay history, Anderson defeated Suljović 21–19 in the best of 35 match with the stipulation that the game must be won by 2 clear legs. The tournament saw Anderson hit 52 180s, the most ever in a winning effort at the Matchplay, and second overall only to the 56 that Adrian Lewis hit in his 2013 campaign.

After taking second in his group with victories over Michael van Gerwen and Dave Chisnall, but a loss to Daryl Gurney, Anderson would meet Suljović again in the semi-final of the 2018 Champions League of Darts. The Scotsman secured an 11–4 victory over the Austrian to avenge his defeat in the 2017 Final where the Austrian won 11–9. Anderson was quick to follow up with another 11–4 victory in the final against his fellow countryman Peter Wright to become the third champion in as many stagings of the tournament. A week later in the World Grand Prix, Anderson would again struggle when he fell to the reigning champion Daryl Gurney for the second time in two weeks, with a 3–0 defeat in the quarter-finals.

In November, Anderson went undefeated in the group stage of the Grand Slam and met MVG in the semi-final having only lost 12 legs combined in the prior rounds. Anderson won the match 16–12 to setup a meeting with Gerwyn Price in the final. After at one point leading the match 11–8, Anderson was visibly distracted by Price, and only won 2 of the next 10 legs, to lose 16–13 in the controversial final. The following week in the 2018 Players Championship Finals, Anderson once again met Van Gerwen in the semi-finals with each of them having only given up 9 legs in the tournament so far. This time around, Van Gerwen would win 11–9.

=== 2019: World Cup win ===
Anderson entered the 2019 World Championship as the fourth seed and won his opening match against Kevin Burness 3–1. He led his third round match against Jermaine Wattimena 3–1, before losing the next two sets, then had to survive match darts to take the game to a tie break before eventually prevailing 5–3 in the deciding set. In the fourth round, Anderson recovered from a 2–0 deficit to Chris Dobey to win the final set in another tiebreaker with a score of 4–2 legs. In the quarter finals, Anderson appeared to have gotten his game back with a 5–2 victory over Dave Chisnall and a 103.03 average, his first over 100 in the tournament. Anderson visibly struggled however in his semi-final match with Michael van Gerwen. The world number one put up a 104.76 average to Anderson's 97.98 to secure a 6–1 victory and only giving up 7 legs.

Anderson had been struggling with back problems for a couple of years at this point, and took the decision to withdraw from the Masters at the start of February 2019 due to these issues. He then had to take the decision to also pull out of the Premier League, meaning that he'd miss the tournament for the first time since 2010. However, Anderson stated that a specialist had found the problem with his back and that he hoped to be back in action within a couple of months after receiving treatment. On 25 February, it was announced that Anderson would make his yearly debut at the 2019 UK Open in March.

Anderson, alongside teammate Peter Wright, won the 2019 PDC World Cup of Darts, the first time Scotland had won the tournament.

=== 2020 ===
Anderson exited the 2020 World Championship in the fourth round, losing to Nathan Aspinall. He returned to the Premier League after a year away.

Anderson won his first ranking title since the 2018 Matchplay at the first Players Championship event of 2020; beating Jeff Smith in the final. At the 2020 World Matchplay, Anderson made his first televised singles final since 2018, losing to Dimitri Van den Bergh.

=== 2021: Fifth world final ===
Anderson went into the 2021 World Championship as thirteenth seed; and dismissed his chances of a third world title after an opening win over Madars Razma, describing 2019 & 2020 as "rotten". He beat Mensur Suljović 4–3 in a controversial game, with Anderson accusing his opponent of gamesmanship. Anderson then whitewashed Devon Petersen to reach the eighth PDC World Championship quarterfinal of his career. Dirk van Duijvenbode won the first set against Anderson in the quarter-finals, but Anderson turned the game around including a run of ten legs in a row to win the match 5–1. Anderson secured a 6–3 win over Dave Chisnall in the semi-finals to qualify for his fifth World Championship final and set up a repeat of the controversial 2018 Grand Slam of Darts final against Gerwyn Price. Anderson went on to lose the final 7–3 to Price.

At the World Matchplay he lost in the second round to Nathan Aspinall.

=== 2022 ===
Anderson reached the semi-finals of the 2022 World Championship. He began his campaign with a 3–1 win over Adrian Lewis in the second round. Victories against Ian White and Rob Cross saw him advance to the quarter-finals. He faced Luke Humphries for a place in the last four and won the match 5–2, securing a seventh PDC World Championship semi-final. He was eliminated in a 6–4 loss to eventual champion Peter Wright.

Anderson earned his first nightly win under the new 2022 Premier League format on night six; he defeated Jonny Clayton, Peter Wright and Michael Smith to win the night in Nottingham. He was forced to withdraw from night nine in Leeds following a positive COVID-19 test. At the end of the league phase, Anderson finished bottom of the table with nine points.

Anderson reached his only ranking final of the year at Players Championship 5 where he lost 8–6 to Damon Heta. He was also the runner-up at the Nordic Darts Masters, losing 11–5 to Dimitri Van den Bergh.

=== 2023 ===
At the 2023 World Championship, Anderson won his opening match 3–1 against Madars Razma. He faced Chris Dobey in the third round and took a 1–0 lead, but Dobey won the next four sets to win the match 4–1 and eliminate Anderson.

Anderson ended a three-year ranking title drought by winning Players Championship 8 in March. He progressed to the final following a 7–3 win against Gerwyn Price before beating Krzysztof Ratajski 8–5. Later in the year, he won back-to-back Players Championship titles at events 24 and 25 with final victories over Ryan Joyce and Josh Rock. Anderson made his return to the European Tour after a seven-year absence by qualifying for the Dutch Darts Championship. However, he lost in the first round of the event, suffering a surprise 6–2 defeat to Czech qualifier Roman Benecký. He also competed at the Belgian Darts Open where he reached the quarter-finals, losing 6–1 to eventual champion Michael van Gerwen.

Anderson and Scotland teammate Peter Wright made it to the final of the World Cup of Darts. The pair whitewashed France 8–0 in the quarter-finals before getting past Germany 8–5 in the semi-finals, but they succumbed to a 10–2 defeat to Wales (Gerwyn Price and Jonny Clayton) in the final. In televised singles competition, Anderson reached the quarter-finals of the Grand Slam of Darts but narrowly lost 16–14 to Luke Humphries, who went on to win the tournament.

=== 2024 ===
Anderson opened his 2024 World Championship campaign with a 3–0 win over Simon Whitlock. He then took out Croatia's Boris Krčmar but then lost 4–3 to Brendan Dolan in the fourth round.

On the 2024 Pro Tour, Anderson won Players Championship 2, defeating Ryan Searle 8–5 in the final. Anderson made the final again at Players Championship 3, but lost in a rematch against Searle 8–7. He earned his second Players Championship title of the year by beating Connor Scutt 8–4 to win Players Championship 22. On the European Tour, Anderson won his first European Tour title since the 2014 German Darts Championship by winning the 2024 European Darts Grand Prix in April. He defeated Christian Perez 6–3, then Gerwyn Price 6–4, Josh Rock 6–5 in a deciding leg and Rob Cross 7–5 to reach the final. Anderson claimed the title with an 8–6 triumph over Ross Smith.

At the Grand Slam of Darts, Anderson reached the semi-finals and established a 13–9 lead against Luke Littler, before losing 16–15 to the eventual champion.

=== 2025 ===
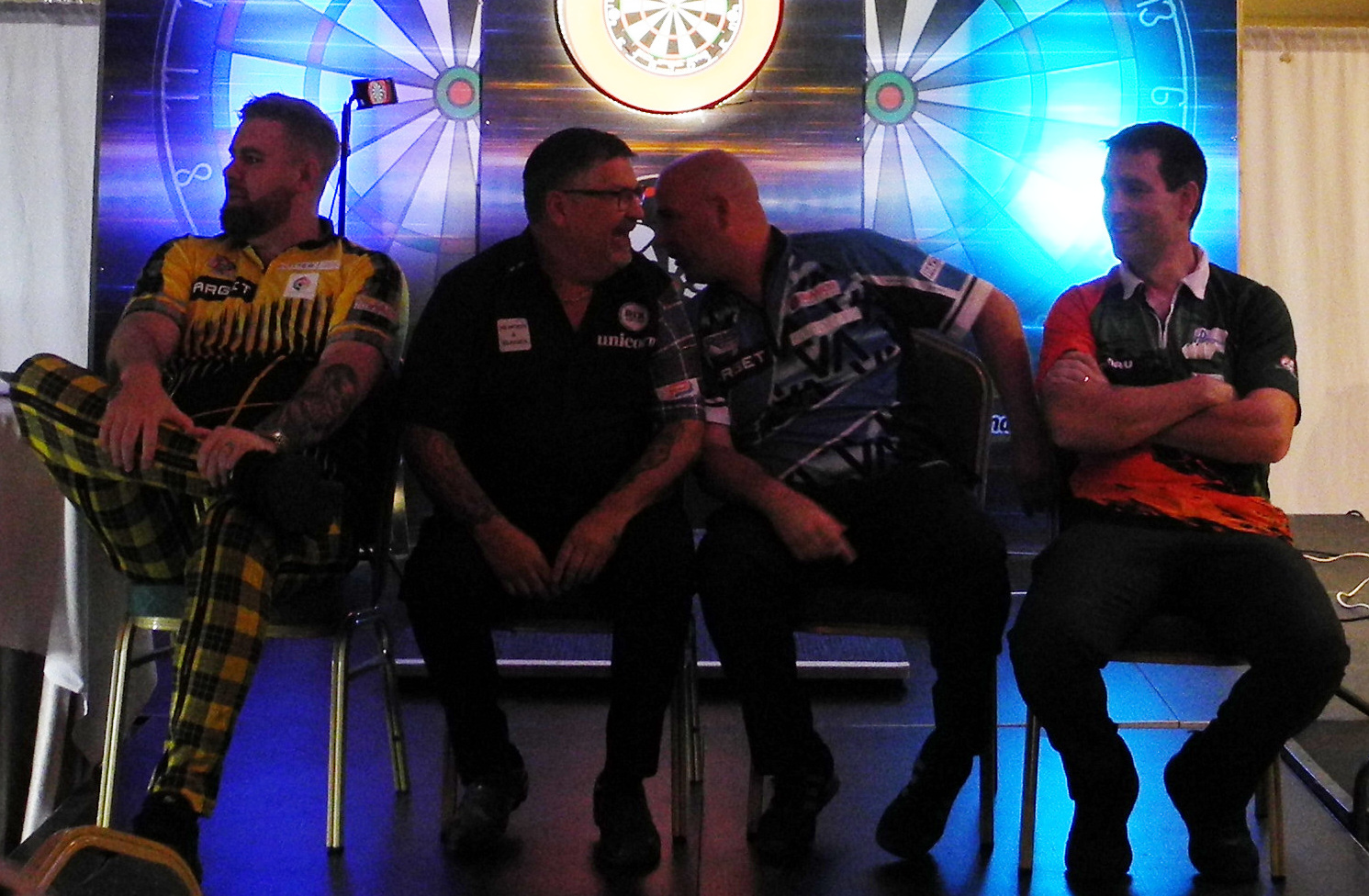
Anderson (second from left) with Scott Williams, Rob Cross and William O'Connor in 2025

At the 2025 World Championship, Anderson suffered a shock 3–0 loss to Jeffrey de Graaf in the second round. This was the first time that Anderson had lost his opening match at the event. He won his first title of the year at Players Championship 7 by defeating Adam Lipscombe 8–3 in the final, marking his 30th Players Championship title in total. He retained the European Darts Grand Prix by whitewashing Andrew Gilding 8–0 in the final. He reached his second European Tour final of the year at the Baltic Sea Darts Open, where he lost 8–3 to Gerwyn Price.

=== 2026 ===
Anderson reached his eighth PDC World Championship semi-final at the 2026 World Championship by defeating Justin Hood 5–2. His run included a 4–1 win over Michael van Gerwen in the fourth round. In the semi-finals, he lost 6–3 to Gian van Veen. At the World Cup of Darts, Anderson and new Scotland teammate Cameron Menzies reached the semi-finals, where they were beaten by eventual champions England. Following a quarter-final finish at the World Matchplay, he reached his first European Tour final of the year at the Hungarian Darts Trophy, losing 8–2 to Ross Smith.

== Personal life ==
Originally from Musselburgh, East Lothian, Anderson moved to Eyemouth, Berwickshire, after meeting his ex-wife Rosemary. The couple have two children.

Having previously worked as a builder, Anderson and his partner Rachel moved south to run the Wellington Arms public house in Rooksbridge, Somerset, for fellow PDC player Steve Grubb. The couple have a son Tai (born 2014), and in October 2017 welcomed a baby girl. Regulars at the Wellington Arms included former world champions, Trina Gulliver and Mark Webster. After handing over running of the pub in 2016 to a new manager to allow Anderson to fully commit to his darts career, the family have since resided in Burnham on Sea, Somerset.

Anderson's father, Gordon Anderson, died in March 2012.

Anderson is a supporter of Scottish football club Hibernian.

Having initially gone under the moniker 'Dreamboy' earlier in his darts career, Anderson is now known as 'The Flying Scotsman', having adopted the nickname after it was passed on to him by Scottish darts player Jocky Wilson in 2009.

== World Championship results ==
=== BDO World Championship ===
- 2002: First round (lost to Stefan Nagy 0–3)
- 2003: Semi-finals (lost to Ritchie Davies 2–5)
- 2004: First round (lost to Tony O'Shea 0–3)
- 2005: First round (lost to Raymond van Barneveld 0–3)
- 2006: Second round (lost to Raymond van Barneveld 1–4)
- 2007: First round (lost to Albertino Essers 1–3)
- 2008: First round (lost to Fabian Roosenbrand 2–3)
- 2009: Quarter-finals (lost to Tony O'Shea 3–5)

=== PDC World Championship ===
- 2010: Second round (lost to Ronnie Baxter 0–4)
- 2011: Runner-up (lost to Adrian Lewis 5–7)
- 2012: Quarter-finals (lost to Simon Whitlock 1–5)
- 2013: Third round (lost to Raymond van Barneveld 0–4)
- 2014: Third round (lost to Michael van Gerwen 3–4)
- 2015: Winner (beat Phil Taylor 7–6)
- 2016: Winner (beat Adrian Lewis 7–5)
- 2017: Runner-up (lost to Michael van Gerwen 3–7)
- 2018: Quarter-finals (lost to Phil Taylor 3–5)
- 2019: Semi-finals (lost to Michael van Gerwen 1–6)
- 2020: Fourth round (lost to Nathan Aspinall 2–4)
- 2021: Runner-up (lost to Gerwyn Price 3–7)
- 2022: Semi-finals (lost to Peter Wright 4–6)
- 2023: Third round (lost to Chris Dobey 1–4)
- 2024: Fourth round (lost to Brendan Dolan 3–4)
- 2025: Second round (lost to Jeffrey de Graaf 0–3)
- 2026: Semi-finals (lost to Gian van Veen 3–6)

== Career finals ==
=== BDO major finals: 4 (4 titles) ===
Legend
World Darts Trophy (1–0)
Zuiderduin Masters (2–0)
International Darts League (1–0)

| Outcome | No. | Year | Championship | Opponent in the final | Score (Note: (l) = score in legs, (s) = score in sets, (m) = score in matches.) |
|---|---|---|---|---|---|
| Winner | 1. | 2007 | International Darts League | (Wales) Mark Webster | 13–9 (s) |
| Winner | 2. | 2007 | World Darts Trophy | (England) Phil Taylor | 7–3 (s) |
| Winner | 3. | 2007 | Zuiderduin Masters | (Wales) Mark Webster | 5–4 (s) |
| Winner | 4. | 2008 | Zuiderduin Masters (2) | (England) Scott Waites | 5–4 (s) |

=== PDC major finals: 21 (8 titles) ===
Legend
World Championship (2–3)
World Matchplay (1–1)
Premier League (2–0)
World Grand Prix (0–1)
Grand Slam (0–2)
UK Open (1–1)
Masters (0–1)
Players Championship Finals (1–1)
Champions League (1–1)
European Championship (0–1)
World Series of Darts Finals (0–1)

| Outcome | No. | Year | Championship | Opponent in the final | Score |
|---|---|---|---|---|---|
| Runner-up | 1. | 2010 | UK Open | Phil Taylor | 5–11 (l) |
| Runner-up | 2. | 2011 | World Championship | Adrian Lewis | 5–7 (s) |
| Runner-up | 3. | 2011 | Players Championship Finals | Phil Taylor | 12–13 (l) |
| Winner | 1. | 2011 | Premier League | Adrian Lewis | 10–4 (l) |
| Runner-up | 4. | 2011 | Grand Slam | Phil Taylor | 4–16 (l) |
| Winner | 2. | 2014 | Players Championship Finals | Adrian Lewis | 11–6 (l) |
| Winner | 3. | 2015 | World Championship | Phil Taylor | 7–6 (s) |
| Winner | 4. | 2015 | Premier League (2) | Michael van Gerwen | 11–7 (l) |
| Runner-up | 5. | 2015 | European Championship | Michael van Gerwen | 10–11 (l) |
| Winner | 5. | 2016 | World Championship (2) | Adrian Lewis | 7–5 (s) |
| Runner-up | 6. | 2016 | World Grand Prix | Michael van Gerwen | 2–5 (s) |
| Runner-up | 7. | 2017 | World Championship (2) | Michael van Gerwen | 3–7 (s) |
| Runner-up | 8. | 2017 | Masters | Michael van Gerwen | 7–11 (l) |
| Runner-up | 9. | 2017 | Champions League | Mensur Suljović | 9–11 (l) |
| Runner-up | 10. | 2017 | World Series of Darts Finals | Michael van Gerwen | 6–11 (l) |
| Winner | 6. | 2018 | UK Open | Corey Cadby | 11–7 (l) |
| Winner | 7. | 2018 | World Matchplay | Mensur Suljović | 21–19 (l) |
| Winner | 8. | 2018 | Champions League | Peter Wright | 11–4 (l) |
| Runner-up | 11. | 2018 | Grand Slam (2) | Gerwyn Price | 13–16 (l) |
| Runner-up | 12. | 2020 | World Matchplay | Dimitri Van den Bergh | 10–18 (l) |
| Runner-up | 13. | 2021 | World Championship (3) | Gerwyn Price | 3–7 (s) |

=== PDC World Series finals: 7 (6 titles) ===
| Outcome | No. | Year | Championship | Opponent in the final | Score |
|---|---|---|---|---|---|
| Winner | 1. | 2016 | Dubai Masters | Michael van Gerwen | 11–9 (l) |
| Winner | 2. | 2016 | Auckland Masters | Adrian Lewis | 11–7 (l) |
| Winner | 3. | 2016 | Tokyo Masters | Michael van Gerwen | 8–6 (l) |
| Winner | 4. | 2017 | Dubai Masters (2) | Michael van Gerwen | 11–7 (l) |
| Winner | 5. | 2017 | Perth Masters | Raymond van Barneveld | 11–7 (l) |
| Winner | 6. | 2018 | US Masters | Rob Cross | 8–4 (l) |
| Runner-up | 1. | 2022 | Nordic Masters | Dimitri Van den Bergh | 5–11 (l) |

=== PDC team finals: 4 (1 title) ===
| Outcome | No. | Year | Championship | Team | Teammate | Opponents in the final | Score |
|---|---|---|---|---|---|---|---|
| Runner-up | 1. | 2015 | World Cup of Darts | Scotland | Peter Wright | England – Phil Taylor and Adrian Lewis | 2–3 (m) |
| Runner-up | 2. | 2018 | World Cup of Darts (2) | Scotland | Peter Wright | Netherlands – Michael van Gerwen and Raymond van Barneveld | 1–3 (m) |
| Winner | 1. | 2019 | World Cup of Darts | Scotland | Peter Wright | Ireland – Steve Lennon and William O'Connor | 3–1 (m) |
| Runner-up | 3. | 2023 | World Cup of Darts (3) | Scotland | Peter Wright | Wales – Gerwyn Price and Jonny Clayton | 2–10 (l) |

== Performance timeline ==
Performance Table Legend
| W | Won the tournament | F | Finalist | SF | Semifinalist | QF | Quarterfinalist | #R; RR; Prel. | Lost in # round Round-robin; Preliminary round | DQ | Disqualified |
| DNQ | Did not qualify | DNP | Did not participate | WD | Withdrew | NH | Tournament not held | #R; RR; Prel. | Lost in # round Round-robin; Preliminary round | NYF | Not yet founded |

=== BDO ===
| Tournament | 2001 | 2002 | 2003 | 2004 | 2005 | 2006 | 2007 | 2008 | 2009 |
|---|---|---|---|---|---|---|---|---|---|
BDO Major events
| World Championship | DNQ | 1R | SF | 1R | 1R | 2R | 1R | 1R | QF |
| International Darts League | NH | | DNQ | RR | DNQ | RR | W | NH | |
| World Darts Trophy | NH | DNQ | 2R | 1R | 1R | 2R | W | NH | |
| World Masters | 3R | DNP | QF | 3R | QF | 4R | (Note: The 2007 World Masters clashed with the 2007 Grand Slam of Darts. Gary Anderson, along with Mark Webster, Martin Adams, Phill Nixon, Shaun Greatbatch and Niels de Ruiter were BDO players at the time who were offered a spot at the 2007 Grand Slam of Darts. Only Adams rejected the Grand Slam offer and chose to play at the 2007 World Masters instead) | 6R | PDC |
| Finder Masters | DNP | | | | | NH | W | W | PDC |

=== PDC ===
| Tournament | 2007 | 2008 | 2009 | 2010 | 2011 | | 2012 | 2013 | 2014 | 2015 | 2016 | 2017 | 2018 | 2019 | 2020 | 2021 | 2022 | 2023 | 2024 | 2025 | 2026 |
|---|---|---|---|---|---|---|---|---|---|---|---|---|---|---|---|---|---|---|---|---|---|
PDC Ranked televised events
| World Championship | BDO | | | 2R | F | | QF | 3R | 3R | W | W | F | QF | SF | 4R | F | SF | 3R | 4R | 2R | SF |
| World Masters (Note: A non-ranked event until 2025.) | Not held | | | | | | | DNQ | QF | SF | 1R | F | SF | WD | SF | 2R | 2R | 2R | DNQ | 1R | 2R |
| UK Open | Non-PDC | | 2R | F | 4R | | 4R | 4R | 5R | 3R | 4R | 3R | W | 4R | 6R | 4R | 4R | 6R | 6R | 4R | 6R |
| World Matchplay | Non-PDC | | 2R | 2R | 1R | | 1R | 2R | SF | 2R | SF | 2R | W | 2R | F | 2R | 1R | 2R | 1R | 2R | QF |
| World Grand Prix | Non-PDC | | 2R | QF | 1R | | 1R | QF | SF | 2R | F | WD | QF | 2R | QF | 1R | 1R | 2R | 2R | QF | 2R |
| European Championship | NH | DNP | QF | 1R | 2R | | EX | WD | 1R | F | 1R | Did not participate | | | | | | DNQ | QF | 1R | DNQ |
| Grand Slam (Note: A non-ranked event until 2015.) | SF | SF | 2R | QF | F | | 2R | 2R | 2R | 2R | SF | SF | F | QF | 2R | 2R | DNQ | QF | SF | RR | DNQ |
| Players Championship Finals | Not held | | DNP | 1R | F | 2R | QF | QF | W | 2R | 2R | 1R | SF | DNQ | 2R | 3R | 2R | 2R | 1R | 2R | |
PDC Non-ranked televised events
| Premier League | Non-PDC | | C | DNP | W | | 8th | 10th | SF | W | SF | SF | SF | WD | SF | 8th | 8th | Did not participate | | | |
| Champions League | Not held | | | | | | | | | | SF | F | W | RR | Not held | | | | | | |
| World Cup | Not held | | | QF | NH | | 2R | 2R | DNQ | F | QF | 1R | F | W | WD | | DNP | F | SF | 2R | SF |
| World Series Finals | Not held | | | | | | | | | 2R | 2R | F | 2R | 2R | WD | 2R | 2R | Did not participate | | | |
Past major events
| Las Vegas Desert Classic | Non-PDC | | QF | Not held | | | | | | | | | | | | | | | | | |
| Championship League | NH | DNP | | RR | RR | | RR | RR | Not held | | | | | | | | | | | | |
Career statistics
| Year-end ranking | Non-PDC | | 34 | 11 | 4 | | 4 | 18 | 4 | 2 | 2 | 3 | 4 | 5 | 13 | 6 | 22 | 27 | 14 | 6 | |

==== European Tour ====
| Season | 1 | 2 | 3 | 4 | 5 | 6 | 7 | 8 | 9 | 10 | 11 | 12 | 13 | 14 | 15 |
|---|---|---|---|---|---|---|---|---|---|---|---|---|---|---|---|
| 2012 | ADO; 3R | Did not participate | | | | | | | | | | | | | |
| 2013 | UKM; 2R | EDT; DNP | EDO; QF | ADO; 2R | GDT; 2R | GDC; 1R | GDM; 3R | DDM; 2R | | | | | | | |
| 2014 | GDC; W | DDM; 2R | GDM; DNP | ADO; 2R | GDT; QF | EDO; SF | EDG; 3R | EDT; WD | | | | | | | |
| 2015 | GDC; F | GDT; 3R | Did not participate | | | | | | | | | | | | |
| 2016 | DDM; 2R | GDM; QF | GDT; QF | EDM; 3R | ADO; DNP | EDO; QF | Did not participate | | | | | | | | |
| 2023 | DNP | | | DNQ | | DDC; 1R | BDO; QF | CDO; WD | GDG; DNQ | DNP | | | GDC; DNQ | | |
| 2024 | BDO; 3R | Withdrew | | EDG; W | Did not participate | | | | | | | | | | |
| 2025 | BDO; 2R | EDT; SF | DNP | | | EDG; W | DDC; WD | EDO; 2R | BSD; F | Withdrew | | | | | |
| 2026 | PDO; 2R | Withdrew | | | EDG; 2R | DNP | | | Withdrew | | HDT; F | CDO; 2R | Withdrew | | DDC; DNP |

==== Players Championships ====
| Season | 1 | 2 | 3 | 4 | 5 | 6 | 7 | 8 | 9 | 10 | 11 | 12 | 13 | 14 | 15 | 16 | 17 | 18 | 19 | 20 | 21 | 22 | 23 | 24 | 25 | 26 | 27 | 28 | 29 | 30 | 31 | 32 | 33 | 34 |
|---|---|---|---|---|---|---|---|---|---|---|---|---|---|---|---|---|---|---|---|---|---|---|---|---|---|---|---|---|---|---|---|---|---|---|
| 2012 | ALI; DNP | | REA; SF | REA; 4R | CRA; 2R | CRA; 2R | BIR; QF | BIR; 3R | CRA; DNP | | BAR; QF | BAR; 1R | DUB; 3R | DUB; F | KIL; 2R | KIL; DNP | CRA; 4R | CRA; 4R | BAR; QF | BAR; 2R | | | | | | | | | | | | | | |
| 2013 | WIG; SF | WIG; 2R | WIG; QF | WIG; QF | CRA; QF | CRA; 1R | BAR; 3R | BAR; 1R | DUB; 4R | DUB; 3R | KIL; 3R | KIL; QF | WIG; 3R | WIG; SF | BAR; 1R | BAR; QF | | | | | | | | | | | | | | | | | | |
| 2014 | BAR; W | BAR; QF | CRA; W | CRA; 3R | WIG; SF | WIG; 2R | WIG; SF | WIG; 1R | CRA; QF | CRA; 1R | COV; W | COV; 3R | CRA; W | CRA; 2R | DUB; 2R | DUB; F | CRA; SF | CRA; 4R | COV; 2R | COV; W | | | | | | | | | | | | | | |
| 2015 | BAR; W | BAR; 2R | BAR; 3R | BAR; SF | BAR; QF | COV; 1R | COV; 4R | COV; 1R | CRA; F | CRA; 4R | Did not participate | | | | BAR; 1R | BAR; 1R | DUB; 3R | DUB; SF | COV; 4R | COV; W | | | | | | | | | | | | | | |
| 2016 | BAR; SF | BAR; 3R | BAR; 1R | BAR; SF | Did not participate | | | | | | | BAR; W | BAR; 1R | BAR; DNP | | | DUB; 1R | DUB; 3R | BAR; DNP | BAR; 1R | | | | | | | | | | | | | | |
| 2017 | BAR; 4R | BAR; W | BAR; 3R | BAR; QF | MIL; 2R | MIL; 4R | BAR; DNP | | WIG; 4R | WIG; W | MIL; DNP | | WIG; F | WIG; W | Did not participate | | | | | | | | | | | | | | | | | | | |
| 2018 | BAR; 3R | BAR; QF | BAR; W | BAR; W | MIL; QF | MIL; 2R | BAR; 2R | BAR; 3R | WIG; QF | WIG; 3R | MIL; W | MIL; 4R | Did not participate | | | | BAR; 4R | BAR; 3R | DUB; 4R | DUB; DNP | BAR; 3R | BAR; DNP | | | | | | | | | | | | |
| 2019 | Did not participate | | | | | | WIG; 2R | WIG; 1R | BAR; Did not participate | | | | BAR; 1R | BAR; 3R | Did not participate | | | | BAR; SF | BAR; 2R | HIL; DNP | | BAR; 2R | BAR; 1R | BAR; 1R | BAR; QF | DUB; 1R | DUB; 2R | BAR; DNP | | | | | |
| 2020 | BAR; W | BAR; 1R | WIG; 2R | WIG; 4R | WIG; 3R | WIG; 3R | BAR; 3R | BAR; 1R | MIL; 1R | MIL; SF | MIL; 1R | MIL; 2R | MIL; 2R | NIE; Did not participate | | | | | COV; 1R | COV; Did not participate | | | | | | | | | | | | | | |
| 2021 | BOL; 4R | BOL; 4R | BOL; 2R | BOL; 1R | MIL; 1R | MIL; 2R | MIL; 2R | Did not participate | | | | | MIL; QF | MIL; SF | MIL; 2R | MIL; 2R | COV; 1R | COV; 2R | COV; QF | Did not participate | | | | BAR; 3R | BAR; 1R | BAR; 2R | BAR; 1R | BAR; 1R | BAR; 3R | BAR; 3R | | | | |
| 2022 | BAR; QF | BAR; 2R | WIG; 2R | WIG; DNP | BAR; F | BAR; 1R | NIE; DNP | | BAR; 4R | BAR; 1R | Did not participate | | | | | | | BAR; 1R | BAR; 2R | BAR; 1R | BAR; DNP | BAR; 2R | BAR; 2R | BAR; 1R | BAR; 4R | BAR; 4R | BAR; QF | BAR; 1R | BAR; 3R | BAR; 3R | | | | |
| 2023 | BAR; 2R | BAR; 1R | BAR; 1R | BAR; 1R | BAR; F | BAR; 2R | HIL; 3R | HIL; W | WIG; QF | WIG; 1R | LEI; 1R | LEI; 3R | HIL; F | HIL; 3R | LEI; 3R | LEI; 1R | HIL; DNP | | BAR; 1R | BAR; 3R | BAR; 4R | BAR; QF | BAR; SF | BAR; W | BAR; W | BAR; QF | BAR; QF | BAR; 1R | BAR; 1R | BAR; DNP | | | | |
| 2024 | WIG; 2R | WIG; W | LEI; F | LEI; 1R | HIL; SF | HIL; 4R | LEI; 1R | LEI; QF | HIL; 3R | HIL; 2R | HIL; DNP | | MIL; 3R | MIL; 1R | MIL; QF | MIL; 1R | MIL; 3R | Did not participate | | | | LEI; W | LEI; 4R | WIG; SF | WIG; 4R | WIG; DNP | | | LEI; 2R | LEI; 3R | | | | |
| 2025 | WIG; 1R | WIG; 2R | ROS; DNP | | LEI; 4R | LEI; 4R | HIL; W | HIL; 2R | LEI; 3R | LEI; 4R | LEI; SF | LEI; QF | ROS; DNP | | HIL; 4R | HIL; 4R | LEI; 1R | LEI; 1R | LEI; 3R | LEI; 2R | LEI; 1R | Did not participate | | | | HIL; SF | HIL; 1R | LEI; 1R | LEI; SF | LEI; 3R | WIG; DNP | | | |
| 2026 | HIL; 3R | HIL; 3R | WIG; DNP | | LEI; 4R | LEI; 2R | LEI; SF | LEI; 1R | WIG; DNP | | MIL; SF | MIL; QF | HIL; 1R | HIL; 1R | LEI; DNP | | | | MIL; 3R | MIL; 2R | WIG; DNP | | LEI; 1R | LEI; 2R | Did not participate | | | | | | | | LEI; SF | LEI; 2R |

=== WDF Majors ===
| WDF Majors | Event | 2000 | 2001 | 2002 | 2003 | 2004 | 2005 | 2006 |
|---|---|---|---|---|---|---|---|---|
| WDF World Cup | Singles | NH | L32 | NH | L16 | NH | L32 | NH |
| WDF World Cup | Pairs | NH | L64 | NH | QF | NH | L32 | NH |
| WDF World Cup | Team | NH | L16 | NH | QF | NH | QF | NH |
| WDF World Cup | Overall Team | NH | 12th | NH | 7th | NH | - | NH |
| WDF Europe Cup | Singles | L64 | NH | L16 | NH | L32 | NH | QF |
| WDF Europe Cup | Pairs | SF | NH | RU | NH | SF | NH | L32 |
| WDF Europe Cup | Team | SF | NH | W | NH | RU | NH | RU |
| WDF Europe Cup | Men's Overall | 4th | NH | W | NH | 4th | NH | RU |

== Nine-dart finishes ==
Gary Anderson televised nine-dart finishes
| Date | Opponent | Tournament | Method | Prize |
|---|---|---|---|---|
| 8 June 2012 | (England) Davey Dodds | UK Open | 3 x T20; 3 x T20; T20, T19, D12 | £10,000 |
| 2 January 2016 | (Netherlands) Jelle Klaasen | PDC World Championship | 3 x T20; 3 x T20; T20, T19, D12 | £15,000 |
| 26 July 2018 | (England) Joe Cullen | World Matchplay | 3 x T20; 3 x T20; T20, T19, D12 | £45,000 |

== Awards ==
=== PDC Awards ===
Anderson has received eight awards at the annual PDC Awards Dinner.

| Year | Nominee / work | Award | Result |
|---|---|---|---|
| 2012 | Gary Anderson | PDC Best Pro Tour Player | Won |
| 2015 | Gary Anderson | PDC Player of the Year | Won |
| 2015 | Gary Anderson | PDPA Players' Player of the Year | Won |
| 2015 | Gary Anderson | PDC Fans' Player of the Year | Won |
| 2015 | Gary Anderson | Pro Tour Player of the Year | Won |
| 2016 | Gary Anderson & Michael van Gerwen | PDC Player of the Year | Won |
| 2016 | Gary Anderson | PDC Fans' Player of the Year | Won |
| 2016 | World Championship Semi-final | Televised Performance of the Year | Nominated |
| 2016 | Gary Anderson | PDC Player of the Year | Nominated |
| 2019 | Gary Anderson | PDC Player of the Year | Nominated |
| 2019 | Gary Anderson | PDC Fans' Player of the Year | Won |
| 2019 | World Matchplay Quarter-final | Televised Performance of the Year | Nominated |

== Notes ==
Awards
| Preceded by Michael van Gerwen | PDC Player of the Year; 2014, 2015 | Succeeded by Michael van Gerwen |
