= 2016 Dubai Duty Free Darts Masters =

Tournament information
- Dates: 26–27 May 2016
- Venue: Dubai Tennis Centre
- Location: Dubai
- Country: United Arab Emirates
- Organisation(s): PDC
- Format: Legs; Final – best of 21 legs
- Prize fund: AED750,000
- Winner's share: AED220,000
- High checkout: 170 (England) Phil Taylor

Champion(s)
- (Scotland) Gary Anderson

The 2016 Dubai Duty Free Darts Masters was the fourth staging of the tournament organised by the Professional Darts Corporation. It was the first World Series of Darts event of 2016. The tournament featured eight of the top 10 players according to the PDC Order of Merit, competing in a knockout system. The tournament was held at the Dubai Tennis Centre in Dubai over 26–27 May 2016.

Gary Anderson won the title after he beat previously undefeated three-time champion Michael van Gerwen 11–9 in the final.

== Prize money ==
The total prize fund was AED750,000.

Position (no. of players)		Prize money (Total: AED750,000)
Winner	(1)	AED220,000
Runner-up	(1)	AED110,000
Semi-finalists	(2)	AED85,000
Quarter-finalists	(4)	AED62,500

== Qualifiers ==
The eight players who qualified for this tournament are the same as last year's tournament, with the exception of Dave Chisnall replacing Stephen Bunting. These were:

Seeded players:

1. (Netherlands) Michael van Gerwen (runner-up)
2. (Scotland) Gary Anderson (winner)
3. (England) Phil Taylor (semi-finals)
4. (England) Adrian Lewis (quarter-finals)

The next four seeded PDC players were (drawn at random against the higher seeds):

- (Scotland) Peter Wright (quarter-finals)
- (England) James Wade (quarter-finals)
- (England) Dave Chisnall (semi-finals)
- (Netherlands) Raymond van Barneveld (quarter-finals)

== Draw ==
Quarter-finals (best of 19 legs); 26 May
1	(Netherlands) Michael van Gerwen 107.65	10
(Scotland) Peter Wright 106.55	7
4	(England) Adrian Lewis 79.46	1
(England) Dave Chisnall 90.18	10
2	(Scotland) Gary Anderson 98.36	10
(Netherlands) Raymond van Barneveld 94.25	8
3	(England) Phil Taylor 93.11	10
(England) James Wade 87.07	2

Semi-finals (best of 21 legs); 27 May
1	(Netherlands) Michael van Gerwen 105.09	11
(England) Dave Chisnall 97.35	7
2	(Scotland) Gary Anderson 97.29	11
3	(England) Phil Taylor 101.65	7

Final (best of 21 legs); 27 May
1	(Netherlands) Michael van Gerwen 100.95	9
2	(Scotland) Gary Anderson 97.98	11

== Broadcasting ==
The tournament was available in the following territories on these channels.

Country	Channel
United Kingdom	ITV4 (delayed coverage)
Republic of Ireland	Setanta Sports
(Emirate of Dubai) Dubai	Dubai Sports TV
Middle East and North Africa	OSN
Australia	Fox Sports
New Zealand	Sky Sport (New Zealand)
Netherlands	RTL7
Asia	Fox Sports
Czech Republic	TV Nova
