= 2016 Auckland Darts Masters =

2016 Auckland Darts Masters, presented by TAB & Burger King

Tournament information
- Dates: 17–19 June 2016
- Venue: The Trusts Arena
- Location: Auckland
- Country: New Zealand
- Organisation(s): PDC
- Format: Legs
- Winner's share: NZ$70,000
- High checkout: 156 (Scotland) Peter Wright

Champion(s)
- (Scotland) Gary Anderson

The 2016 Auckland Darts Masters, presented by TAB & Burger King was the second staging of the tournament by the Professional Darts Corporation, as a second entry in the 2016 World Series of Darts. The tournament featured 16 players (eight PDC players facing eight regional qualifiers) and was held at The Trusts Arena in Auckland, New Zealand between 17 and 19 June 2016.

Adrian Lewis was the defending champion after winning the first edition of the tournament by defeating Raymond van Barneveld 11–10 in the final.

Lewis could not successfully defend his title: Gary Anderson won the title after defeating Lewis 11–7 in the final.

== Qualifiers ==
The eight PDC players (with the top 4 seeded) were:

1. (Scotland) Gary Anderson (winner)
2. (Netherlands) Michael van Gerwen (quarter-finals)
3. (England) Phil Taylor (quarter-finals)
4. (England) Dave Chisnall (quarter-finals)
5. (England) Adrian Lewis (runner-up)
6. (Scotland) Peter Wright (quarter-finals)
7. (England) James Wade (semi-finals)
8. (Netherlands) Raymond van Barneveld (semi-finals)

The Oceanic qualifiers were:

- (New Zealand) Warren Parry (first round)
- (New Zealand) Cody Harris (first round)
- (Australia) Damon Heta (first round)
- (New Zealand) Rob Szabo (first round)
- (New Zealand) Ken Moir (first round)
- (Australia) Tic Bridge (first round)
- (New Zealand) Bernie Smith (first round)
- (New Zealand) Stuart Leach (first round)

== Draw ==
First round (best of 11 legs); 17 June
1	(Scotland) Gary Anderson 106.61	6
(New Zealand) Bernie Smith 83.83	2
(Scotland) Peter Wright 96.53	6
(New Zealand) Warren Parry 81.09	1
4	(England) Dave Chisnall 91.34	6
(Australia) Tic Bridge 82.83	4
(Netherlands) Raymond van Barneveld 97.36	6
(New Zealand) Cody Harris 86.97	2
2	(Netherlands) Michael van Gerwen 100.60	6
(Australia) Damon Heta 85.52	3
(England) James Wade 89.04	6
(New Zealand) Ken Moir 76.00	2
3	(England) Phil Taylor 106.09	6
(New Zealand) Rob Szabo 77.07	0
(England) Adrian Lewis 95.94	6
(New Zealand) Stuart Leech 78.45	0

Quarter-finals (best of 19 legs); 18 June
1	(Scotland) Gary Anderson 103.93	10
(Scotland) Peter Wright 96.13	6
4	(England) Dave Chisnall 95.91	5
(Netherlands) Raymond van Barneveld 101.11	10
2	(Netherlands) Michael van Gerwen 107.63	6
(England) James Wade 107.45	10
3	(England) Phil Taylor 107.57	9
(England) Adrian Lewis 101.71	10

Semi-finals (best of 21 legs); 19 June
1	(Scotland) Gary Anderson 111.37	11
(Netherlands) Raymond van Barneveld 104.85	7
(England) James Wade 94.51	9
(England) Adrian Lewis 100.28	11

Final (best of 21 legs); 19 June
1	(Scotland) Gary Anderson 99.60	11
(England) Adrian Lewis 98.96	7
