= 2017 Grand Slam of Darts =

2017 bwin Grand Slam of Darts

Tournament information
- Dates: 11–19 November 2017
- Venue: Wolverhampton Civic Hall
- Location: Wolverhampton
- Country: England
- Organisation(s): PDC
- Format: Legs
- Prize fund: £450,000
- Winner's share: £110,000
- High checkout: 170 (England) Rob Cross (Scotland) Peter Wright

Champion(s)
- (Netherlands) Michael van Gerwen

The 2017 Grand Slam of Darts, was the eleventh staging of the tournament, organised by the Professional Darts Corporation. The event took place from 11–19 November 2017 at the Wolverhampton Civic Hall, Wolverhampton, England.

The tournament's defending champion was Michael van Gerwen, who won the tournament in 2016 by defeating James Wade 16–8 in the final. He retained his title for a 3rd consecutive year by beating Peter Wright 16–12 in this year's final.

== Prize money ==
The prize fund for the Grand Slam was increased from £400,000 in 2016 to £450,000 in 2017, with the winner getting £110,000, as opposed to £100,000.

| Position (num. of players) | | Prize money (Total: £450,000) |
|---|---|---|
| Winner | (1) | £110,000 |
| Runner-up | (1) | £55,000 |
| Semi-finalists | (2) | £28,500 |
| Quarter-finalists | (4) | £16,000 |
| Last 16 (second round) | (8) | £10,000 |
| Third in group | (8) | £5,000 |
| Fourth in group | (8) | £3,000 |
| Group winner bonus | (8) | £2,500 |

== Qualifying ==
=== PDC qualifying tournaments ===
PDC Main Tournaments
| Tournament | Year | Position | Player | Qualifiers |
|---|---|---|---|---|
| PDC World Darts Championship | 2017 | Winner | (Netherlands) Michael van Gerwen | (Netherlands) Michael van Gerwen (England) Phil Taylor (Northern Ireland) Daryl Gurney (Australia) Corey Cadby (Scotland) Peter Wright (Austria) Mensur Suljović (Netherlands) Raymond van Barneveld (Scotland) Gary Anderson (England) James Wade (Australia) Simon Whitlock (Netherlands) Berry van Peer (Wales) Gerwyn Price (England) Rob Cross (England) Dave Chisnall (Wales) Mark Webster |
| Grand Slam of Darts | 2016 | Winner | (Netherlands) Michael van Gerwen | (Netherlands) Michael van Gerwen (England) Phil Taylor (Northern Ireland) Daryl Gurney (Australia) Corey Cadby (Scotland) Peter Wright (Austria) Mensur Suljović (Netherlands) Raymond van Barneveld (Scotland) Gary Anderson (England) James Wade (Australia) Simon Whitlock (Netherlands) Berry van Peer (Wales) Gerwyn Price (England) Rob Cross (England) Dave Chisnall (Wales) Mark Webster |
| Premier League Darts | 2017 | Winner | (Netherlands) Michael van Gerwen | (Netherlands) Michael van Gerwen (England) Phil Taylor (Northern Ireland) Daryl Gurney (Australia) Corey Cadby (Scotland) Peter Wright (Austria) Mensur Suljović (Netherlands) Raymond van Barneveld (Scotland) Gary Anderson (England) James Wade (Australia) Simon Whitlock (Netherlands) Berry van Peer (Wales) Gerwyn Price (England) Rob Cross (England) Dave Chisnall (Wales) Mark Webster |
| World Matchplay | 2017 | Winner | (England) Phil Taylor | (Netherlands) Michael van Gerwen (England) Phil Taylor (Northern Ireland) Daryl Gurney (Australia) Corey Cadby (Scotland) Peter Wright (Austria) Mensur Suljović (Netherlands) Raymond van Barneveld (Scotland) Gary Anderson (England) James Wade (Australia) Simon Whitlock (Netherlands) Berry van Peer (Wales) Gerwyn Price (England) Rob Cross (England) Dave Chisnall (Wales) Mark Webster |
| World Grand Prix | 2017 | Winner | (Northern Ireland) Daryl Gurney | (Netherlands) Michael van Gerwen (England) Phil Taylor (Northern Ireland) Daryl Gurney (Australia) Corey Cadby (Scotland) Peter Wright (Austria) Mensur Suljović (Netherlands) Raymond van Barneveld (Scotland) Gary Anderson (England) James Wade (Australia) Simon Whitlock (Netherlands) Berry van Peer (Wales) Gerwyn Price (England) Rob Cross (England) Dave Chisnall (Wales) Mark Webster |
| PDC World Youth Championship | 2016 | Winner | (Australia) Corey Cadby | (Netherlands) Michael van Gerwen (England) Phil Taylor (Northern Ireland) Daryl Gurney (Australia) Corey Cadby (Scotland) Peter Wright (Austria) Mensur Suljović (Netherlands) Raymond van Barneveld (Scotland) Gary Anderson (England) James Wade (Australia) Simon Whitlock (Netherlands) Berry van Peer (Wales) Gerwyn Price (England) Rob Cross (England) Dave Chisnall (Wales) Mark Webster |
| Masters | 2017 | Winner | (Netherlands) Michael van Gerwen | (Netherlands) Michael van Gerwen (England) Phil Taylor (Northern Ireland) Daryl Gurney (Australia) Corey Cadby (Scotland) Peter Wright (Austria) Mensur Suljović (Netherlands) Raymond van Barneveld (Scotland) Gary Anderson (England) James Wade (Australia) Simon Whitlock (Netherlands) Berry van Peer (Wales) Gerwyn Price (England) Rob Cross (England) Dave Chisnall (Wales) Mark Webster |
| UK Open | 2017 | Winner | (Scotland) Peter Wright | (Netherlands) Michael van Gerwen (England) Phil Taylor (Northern Ireland) Daryl Gurney (Australia) Corey Cadby (Scotland) Peter Wright (Austria) Mensur Suljović (Netherlands) Raymond van Barneveld (Scotland) Gary Anderson (England) James Wade (Australia) Simon Whitlock (Netherlands) Berry van Peer (Wales) Gerwyn Price (England) Rob Cross (England) Dave Chisnall (Wales) Mark Webster |
| European Championship | 2017 | Winner | (Netherlands) Michael van Gerwen | (Netherlands) Michael van Gerwen (England) Phil Taylor (Northern Ireland) Daryl Gurney (Australia) Corey Cadby (Scotland) Peter Wright (Austria) Mensur Suljović (Netherlands) Raymond van Barneveld (Scotland) Gary Anderson (England) James Wade (Australia) Simon Whitlock (Netherlands) Berry van Peer (Wales) Gerwyn Price (England) Rob Cross (England) Dave Chisnall (Wales) Mark Webster |
| Players Championship Finals | 2016 | Winner | (Netherlands) Michael van Gerwen | (Netherlands) Michael van Gerwen (England) Phil Taylor (Northern Ireland) Daryl Gurney (Australia) Corey Cadby (Scotland) Peter Wright (Austria) Mensur Suljović (Netherlands) Raymond van Barneveld (Scotland) Gary Anderson (England) James Wade (Australia) Simon Whitlock (Netherlands) Berry van Peer (Wales) Gerwyn Price (England) Rob Cross (England) Dave Chisnall (Wales) Mark Webster |
| Champions League of Darts | 2017 | Winner | (Austria) Mensur Suljović | (Netherlands) Michael van Gerwen (England) Phil Taylor (Northern Ireland) Daryl Gurney (Australia) Corey Cadby (Scotland) Peter Wright (Austria) Mensur Suljović (Netherlands) Raymond van Barneveld (Scotland) Gary Anderson (England) James Wade (Australia) Simon Whitlock (Netherlands) Berry van Peer (Wales) Gerwyn Price (England) Rob Cross (England) Dave Chisnall (Wales) Mark Webster |
| World Series of Darts Finals | 2017 | Winner | (Netherlands) Michael van Gerwen | (Netherlands) Michael van Gerwen (England) Phil Taylor (Northern Ireland) Daryl Gurney (Australia) Corey Cadby (Scotland) Peter Wright (Austria) Mensur Suljović (Netherlands) Raymond van Barneveld (Scotland) Gary Anderson (England) James Wade (Australia) Simon Whitlock (Netherlands) Berry van Peer (Wales) Gerwyn Price (England) Rob Cross (England) Dave Chisnall (Wales) Mark Webster |
| PDC World Cup of Darts | 2017 | Winners | (Netherlands) Michael van Gerwen (Netherlands) Raymond van Barneveld | (Netherlands) Michael van Gerwen (England) Phil Taylor (Northern Ireland) Daryl Gurney (Australia) Corey Cadby (Scotland) Peter Wright (Austria) Mensur Suljović (Netherlands) Raymond van Barneveld (Scotland) Gary Anderson (England) James Wade (Australia) Simon Whitlock (Netherlands) Berry van Peer (Wales) Gerwyn Price (England) Rob Cross (England) Dave Chisnall (Wales) Mark Webster |
| PDC World Darts Championship | 2017 | Runner-Up | (Scotland) Gary Anderson | (Netherlands) Michael van Gerwen (England) Phil Taylor (Northern Ireland) Daryl Gurney (Australia) Corey Cadby (Scotland) Peter Wright (Austria) Mensur Suljović (Netherlands) Raymond van Barneveld (Scotland) Gary Anderson (England) James Wade (Australia) Simon Whitlock (Netherlands) Berry van Peer (Wales) Gerwyn Price (England) Rob Cross (England) Dave Chisnall (Wales) Mark Webster |
| Grand Slam of Darts | 2016 | Runner-Up | (England) James Wade | (Netherlands) Michael van Gerwen (England) Phil Taylor (Northern Ireland) Daryl Gurney (Australia) Corey Cadby (Scotland) Peter Wright (Austria) Mensur Suljović (Netherlands) Raymond van Barneveld (Scotland) Gary Anderson (England) James Wade (Australia) Simon Whitlock (Netherlands) Berry van Peer (Wales) Gerwyn Price (England) Rob Cross (England) Dave Chisnall (Wales) Mark Webster |
| Premier League Darts | 2017 | Runner-Up | (Scotland) Peter Wright | (Netherlands) Michael van Gerwen (England) Phil Taylor (Northern Ireland) Daryl Gurney (Australia) Corey Cadby (Scotland) Peter Wright (Austria) Mensur Suljović (Netherlands) Raymond van Barneveld (Scotland) Gary Anderson (England) James Wade (Australia) Simon Whitlock (Netherlands) Berry van Peer (Wales) Gerwyn Price (England) Rob Cross (England) Dave Chisnall (Wales) Mark Webster |
| World Matchplay | 2017 | Runner-Up | (Scotland) Peter Wright | (Netherlands) Michael van Gerwen (England) Phil Taylor (Northern Ireland) Daryl Gurney (Australia) Corey Cadby (Scotland) Peter Wright (Austria) Mensur Suljović (Netherlands) Raymond van Barneveld (Scotland) Gary Anderson (England) James Wade (Australia) Simon Whitlock (Netherlands) Berry van Peer (Wales) Gerwyn Price (England) Rob Cross (England) Dave Chisnall (Wales) Mark Webster |
| World Grand Prix | 2017 | Runner-Up | (Australia) Simon Whitlock | (Netherlands) Michael van Gerwen (England) Phil Taylor (Northern Ireland) Daryl Gurney (Australia) Corey Cadby (Scotland) Peter Wright (Austria) Mensur Suljović (Netherlands) Raymond van Barneveld (Scotland) Gary Anderson (England) James Wade (Australia) Simon Whitlock (Netherlands) Berry van Peer (Wales) Gerwyn Price (England) Rob Cross (England) Dave Chisnall (Wales) Mark Webster |
| PDC World Youth Championship | 2016 | Runner-Up | (Netherlands) Berry van Peer | (Netherlands) Michael van Gerwen (England) Phil Taylor (Northern Ireland) Daryl Gurney (Australia) Corey Cadby (Scotland) Peter Wright (Austria) Mensur Suljović (Netherlands) Raymond van Barneveld (Scotland) Gary Anderson (England) James Wade (Australia) Simon Whitlock (Netherlands) Berry van Peer (Wales) Gerwyn Price (England) Rob Cross (England) Dave Chisnall (Wales) Mark Webster |
| Masters | 2017 | Runner-Up | (Scotland) Gary Anderson | (Netherlands) Michael van Gerwen (England) Phil Taylor (Northern Ireland) Daryl Gurney (Australia) Corey Cadby (Scotland) Peter Wright (Austria) Mensur Suljović (Netherlands) Raymond van Barneveld (Scotland) Gary Anderson (England) James Wade (Australia) Simon Whitlock (Netherlands) Berry van Peer (Wales) Gerwyn Price (England) Rob Cross (England) Dave Chisnall (Wales) Mark Webster |
| UK Open | 2017 | Runner-Up | (Wales) Gerwyn Price | (Netherlands) Michael van Gerwen (England) Phil Taylor (Northern Ireland) Daryl Gurney (Australia) Corey Cadby (Scotland) Peter Wright (Austria) Mensur Suljović (Netherlands) Raymond van Barneveld (Scotland) Gary Anderson (England) James Wade (Australia) Simon Whitlock (Netherlands) Berry van Peer (Wales) Gerwyn Price (England) Rob Cross (England) Dave Chisnall (Wales) Mark Webster |
| European Championship | 2017 | Runner-Up | (England) Rob Cross | (Netherlands) Michael van Gerwen (England) Phil Taylor (Northern Ireland) Daryl Gurney (Australia) Corey Cadby (Scotland) Peter Wright (Austria) Mensur Suljović (Netherlands) Raymond van Barneveld (Scotland) Gary Anderson (England) James Wade (Australia) Simon Whitlock (Netherlands) Berry van Peer (Wales) Gerwyn Price (England) Rob Cross (England) Dave Chisnall (Wales) Mark Webster |
| Players Championship Finals | 2016 | Runner-Up | (England) Dave Chisnall | (Netherlands) Michael van Gerwen (England) Phil Taylor (Northern Ireland) Daryl Gurney (Australia) Corey Cadby (Scotland) Peter Wright (Austria) Mensur Suljović (Netherlands) Raymond van Barneveld (Scotland) Gary Anderson (England) James Wade (Australia) Simon Whitlock (Netherlands) Berry van Peer (Wales) Gerwyn Price (England) Rob Cross (England) Dave Chisnall (Wales) Mark Webster |
| Champions League of Darts | 2017 | Runner-Up | (Scotland) Gary Anderson | (Netherlands) Michael van Gerwen (England) Phil Taylor (Northern Ireland) Daryl Gurney (Australia) Corey Cadby (Scotland) Peter Wright (Austria) Mensur Suljović (Netherlands) Raymond van Barneveld (Scotland) Gary Anderson (England) James Wade (Australia) Simon Whitlock (Netherlands) Berry van Peer (Wales) Gerwyn Price (England) Rob Cross (England) Dave Chisnall (Wales) Mark Webster |
| World Series of Darts Finals | 2017 | Runner-Up | (Scotland) Gary Anderson | (Netherlands) Michael van Gerwen (England) Phil Taylor (Northern Ireland) Daryl Gurney (Australia) Corey Cadby (Scotland) Peter Wright (Austria) Mensur Suljović (Netherlands) Raymond van Barneveld (Scotland) Gary Anderson (England) James Wade (Australia) Simon Whitlock (Netherlands) Berry van Peer (Wales) Gerwyn Price (England) Rob Cross (England) Dave Chisnall (Wales) Mark Webster |
| PDC World Cup of Darts | 2017 | Runners-Up | (Wales) Gerwyn Price (Wales) Mark Webster | (Netherlands) Michael van Gerwen (England) Phil Taylor (Northern Ireland) Daryl Gurney (Australia) Corey Cadby (Scotland) Peter Wright (Austria) Mensur Suljović (Netherlands) Raymond van Barneveld (Scotland) Gary Anderson (England) James Wade (Australia) Simon Whitlock (Netherlands) Berry van Peer (Wales) Gerwyn Price (England) Rob Cross (England) Dave Chisnall (Wales) Mark Webster |
| Note: Players in italics had already qualified for the tournament. | | | | (Netherlands) Michael van Gerwen (England) Phil Taylor (Northern Ireland) Daryl Gurney (Australia) Corey Cadby (Scotland) Peter Wright (Austria) Mensur Suljović (Netherlands) Raymond van Barneveld (Scotland) Gary Anderson (England) James Wade (Australia) Simon Whitlock (Netherlands) Berry van Peer (Wales) Gerwyn Price (England) Rob Cross (England) Dave Chisnall (Wales) Mark Webster |

At most sixteen players could qualify through this method, where the position in the list depicts the priority of the qualification.

In case the list of qualifiers from the main tournaments produced fewer than sixteen players, the field of sixteen players is filled from the reserve lists. The first list consists of the winners from 2017 European Tour events, in which the winners shall be selected in Order of Merit position order at the cut-off date.

PDC European Tour
| Tournament | Event | Position | Player | Qualifiers |
|---|---|---|---|---|
2017 European Tour
| 2017 European Tour | German Darts Championship | Winner | (Scotland) Peter Wright | (England) Michael Smith |
| 2017 European Tour | German Darts Masters | Winner | (Netherlands) Michael van Gerwen | (England) Michael Smith |
| 2017 European Tour | German Darts Open | Winner | (Scotland) Peter Wright | (England) Michael Smith |
| 2017 European Tour | European Darts Grand Prix | Winner | (Scotland) Peter Wright | (England) Michael Smith |
| 2017 European Tour | Gibraltar Darts Trophy | Winner | (England) Michael Smith | (England) Michael Smith |
| 2017 European Tour | European Darts Matchplay | Winner | (Netherlands) Michael van Gerwen | (England) Michael Smith |
| 2017 European Tour | Austrian Darts Open | Winner | (Netherlands) Michael van Gerwen | (England) Michael Smith |
| 2017 European Tour | European Darts Open | Winner | (Scotland) Peter Wright | (England) Michael Smith |
| 2017 European Tour | Dutch Darts Masters | Winner | (Netherlands) Michael van Gerwen | (England) Michael Smith |
| 2017 European Tour | German Darts Grand Prix | Winner | (Netherlands) Michael van Gerwen | (England) Michael Smith |
| 2017 European Tour | International Darts Open | Winner | (Scotland) Peter Wright | (England) Michael Smith |
| 2017 European Tour | European Darts Trophy | Winner | (Netherlands) Michael van Gerwen | (England) Michael Smith |
| Note: Players in italics had already qualified for the tournament. | | | | (England) Michael Smith |

Had there still been less than sixteen qualified players after the winners of European Tour events were added, the winners of 2017 Players Championships events would have been added, followed by the winners of qualifying tournaments for the 2017 UK Open. As there are already 16 qualified players after the first two qualification methods, no player will qualify via Players Championships and UK Open qualifying events. This resulted in Adrian Lewis missing the tournament for the first time.

=== PDC qualifying event ===
A further eight places in the Grand Slam of Darts will be filled by qualifiers from a PDC qualifier that took place in Wigan on 6 November. These are the qualifiers:

- (England) James Wilson
- (England) Robbie Green
- (England) Joe Murnan
- (England) Alan Norris
- (Netherlands) Jeffrey de Zwaan
- (England) Darren Webster
- (Republic of Ireland) Steve Lennon
- (England) Stephen Bunting

=== BDO qualifying tournaments ===
| Tournament | Year | Position | Player |
|---|---|---|---|
| BDO World Darts Championship | 2017 | Winner | (England) Glen Durrant |
| BDO World Darts Championship | 2017 | Runner-Up | (Netherlands) Danny Noppert |
| World Masters | 2016 | Winner | (England) Glen Durrant |
| BDO World Trophy | 2017 | Winner | (Australia) Peter Machin |

=== BDO ranking qualifiers ===
The remaining five BDO representatives were the top five non-qualified players from the BDO Invitational Rankings at 30 September 2017.

The five qualifiers were confirmed on 10 October 2017, and were:

- (England) Mark McGeeney
- (England) Jamie Hughes
- (England) Scott Mitchell
- (Scotland) Ross Montgomery
- (Scotland) Cameron Menzies

== Pools ==
| Pool A | Pool B | Pool C | Pool D |
| (PDC Seeded Players) | (PDC Qualifiers) | | (BDO Qualifiers) |
|---|---|---|---|
| (Netherlands) Michael van Gerwen (1) (Scotland) Peter Wright (2) (Scotland) Gary Anderson (3) (Northern Ireland) Daryl Gurney (4) (England) Phil Taylor (5) (Austria) Mensur Suljović (6) (England) Dave Chisnall (7) (Netherlands) Raymond van Barneveld (8) | (England) Michael Smith (Australia) Simon Whitlock (England) James Wade (England) Alan Norris (Wales) Gerwyn Price (England) Stephen Bunting (England) Rob Cross (England) Darren Webster | (Wales) Mark Webster (England) James Wilson (England) Robbie Green (England) Joe Murnan (Netherlands) Jeffrey de Zwaan (Netherlands) Berry van Peer (Republic of Ireland) Steve Lennon (Australia) Corey Cadby | (England) Mark McGeeney (England) Glen Durrant (England) Jamie Hughes (England) Scott Mitchell (Scotland) Ross Montgomery (Scotland) Cameron Menzies (Netherlands) Danny Noppert (Australia) Peter Machin |

== Draw ==
=== Group stage ===
All group matches are best of nine legs
After three games, the top two in each group qualify for the knock-out stage
NB in Brackets: Number = Seeds; BDO = BDO Darts player; Q = Qualifier
NB: P = Played; W = Won; L = Lost; LF = Legs for; LA = Legs against; +/− = Plus/minus record, in relation to legs; Pts = Points; Status = Qualified to knockout stage

==== Group A ====
| Pos. | Player | P | W | L | LF | LA | +/− | Pts | Status |
|---|---|---|---|---|---|---|---|---|---|
| 1 | (Netherlands) Michael van Gerwen (1) | 3 | 3 | 0 | 15 | 7 | +8 | 6 | Q |
| 2 | (England) Rob Cross | 3 | 2 | 1 | 14 | 8 | +6 | 4 | Q |
| 3 | (Scotland) Ross Montgomery (BDO) | 3 | 1 | 2 | 8 | 13 | –5 | 2 | Eliminated |
| 4 | (England) Joe Murnan (Q) | 3 | 0 | 3 | 6 | 15 | –9 | 0 | Eliminated |

11 November

| 100.95 Michael van Gerwen (Netherlands) | 5 – 1 | (Scotland) Ross Montgomery 97.24 |
| 103.87 Rob Cross (England) | 5 – 1 | (England) Joe Murnan 87.26 |

12 November

| 108.28 Michael van Gerwen (Netherlands) | 5 – 4 | (England) Rob Cross 104.70 |
| 86.29 Joe Murnan (England) | 3 – 5 | (Scotland) Ross Montgomery 100.96 |

14 November

| 108.29 Michael van Gerwen (Netherlands) | 5 – 2 | (England) Joe Murnan 93.40 |
| 105.76 Rob Cross (England) | 5 – 2 | (Scotland) Ross Montgomery 87.43 |

==== Group B ====
| Pos. | Player | P | W | L | LF | LA | +/− | Pts | Status |
|---|---|---|---|---|---|---|---|---|---|
| 1 | (Netherlands) Raymond van Barneveld (8) | 3 | 3 | 0 | 15 | 7 | +8 | 6 | Q |
| 2 | (Republic of Ireland) Steve Lennon (Q) | 3 | 1 | 2 | 10 | 10 | 0 | 2 | Q |
| 3 | (Wales) Gerwyn Price | 3 | 1 | 2 | 10 | 13 | –3 | 2 | Eliminated |
| 4 | (England) Jamie Hughes (BDO) | 3 | 1 | 2 | 6 | 11 | –5 | 2 | Eliminated |

11 November

| 98.77 Raymond van Barneveld (Netherlands) | 5 – 1 | (England) Jamie Hughes 85.13 |
| 102.83 Gerwyn Price (Wales) | 5 – 3 | (Republic of Ireland) Steve Lennon 96.90 |

12 November

| 98.81 Raymond van Barneveld (Netherlands) | 5 – 4 | (Wales) Gerwyn Price 101.10 |
| 100.20 Steve Lennon (Republic of Ireland) | 5 – 0 | (England) Jamie Hughes 74.29 |

14 November

| 98.37 Raymond van Barneveld (Netherlands) | 5 – 2 | (Republic of Ireland) Steve Lennon 94.74 |
| 89.45 Gerwyn Price (Wales) | 1 – 5 | (England) Jamie Hughes 92.34 |

==== Group C ====
| Pos. | Player | P | W | L | LF | LA | +/− | Pts | Status |
|---|---|---|---|---|---|---|---|---|---|
| 1 | (England) Phil Taylor (5) | 3 | 2 | 1 | 13 | 10 | +3 | 4 | Q |
| 2 | (England) James Wade | 3 | 2 | 1 | 11 | 9 | +2 | 4 | Q |
| 3 | (England) Robbie Green (Q) | 3 | 1 | 2 | 12 | 11 | +1 | 2 | Eliminated |
| 4 | (Australia) Peter Machin (BDO) | 3 | 1 | 2 | 7 | 13 | –6 | 2 | Eliminated |

11 November

| 99.13 Phil Taylor (England) | 5 – 1 | (Australia) Peter Machin 85.82 |
| 83.74 James Wade (England) | 1 – 5 | (England) Robbie Green 88.42 |

12 November

| 99.39 Phil Taylor (England) | 5 – 4 | (England) Robbie Green 98.98 |
| 91.47 James Wade (England) | 5 – 1 | (Australia) Peter Machin 85.12 |

14 November

| 84.88 Phil Taylor (England) | 3 – 5 | (England) James Wade 90.84 |
| 79.06 Robbie Green (England) | 3 – 5 | (Australia) Peter Machin 79.53 |

==== Group D ====
| Pos. | Player | P | W | L | LF | LA | +/− | Pts | Status |
|---|---|---|---|---|---|---|---|---|---|
| 1 | (Northern Ireland) Daryl Gurney (4) | 3 | 3 | 0 | 15 | 5 | +10 | 6 | Q |
| 2 | (England) Darren Webster (Q) | 3 | 1 | 2 | 9 | 12 | –3 | 2 | Nine Dart Shootout |
| 2 | (Wales) Mark Webster | 3 | 1 | 2 | 10 | 13 | –3 | 2 | Nine Dart Shootout |
| 4 | (Netherlands) Danny Noppert (BDO) | 3 | 1 | 2 | 8 | 12 | –4 | 2 | Eliminated |

11 November

| 97.00 Daryl Gurney (Northern Ireland) | 5 – 1 | (Netherlands) Danny Noppert 92.65 |
| 86.07 Darren Webster (England) | 3 – 5 | (Wales) Mark Webster 90.51 |

12 November

| 96.08 Daryl Gurney (Northern Ireland) | 5 – 3 | (Wales) Mark Webster 90.55 |
| 103.44 Darren Webster (England) | 5 – 2 | (Netherlands) Danny Noppert 98.57 |

14 November

| 98.80 Daryl Gurney (Northern Ireland) | 5 – 1 | (England) Darren Webster 88.59 |
| 92.52 Mark Webster (Wales) | 2 – 5 | (Netherlands) Danny Noppert 90.08 |

===== Nine dart shootout =====
With Mark Webster and Darren Webster finishing level on points and leg difference, a nine-dart shootout between the two took place to see who would play the Group C winner Phil Taylor in the second round. The match took place after the conclusion of Tuesday's group matches, and was the second year in succession that a nine-dart shootout was required. Mark Webster threw first.

| POS | Player | 1 | 2 | 3 | 4 | 5 | 6 | 7 | 8 | 9 | Pts | Status |
|---|---|---|---|---|---|---|---|---|---|---|---|---|
| 2 | (England) Darren Webster | 20 | 60 | 20 | 60 | 1 | 60 | 20 | 3 | 57 | 301 | Advanced to the last 16 |
| 3 | (Wales) Mark Webster | 60 | 60 | 20 | 20 | 19 | 19 | 20 | 60 | 20 | 298 | Eliminated |

==== Group E ====
| Pos. | Player | P | W | L | LF | LA | +/− | Pts | Status |
|---|---|---|---|---|---|---|---|---|---|
| 1 | (England) Glen Durrant (BDO) | 3 | 2 | 1 | 14 | 10 | +4 | 4 | Q |
| 2 | (Scotland) Peter Wright (2) | 3 | 2 | 1 | 12 | 9 | +3 | 4 | Q |
| 3 | (England) Alan Norris (Q) | 3 | 1 | 2 | 12 | 14 | −2 | 2 | Eliminated |
| 4 | (Australia) Corey Cadby | 3 | 1 | 2 | 9 | 14 | −5 | 2 | Eliminated |

11 November

| 102.84 Peter Wright (Scotland) | 2 – 5 | (England) Glen Durrant 106.05 |
| 86.82 Alan Norris (England) | 5 – 4 | (Australia) Corey Cadby 85.33 |

12 November

| 92.78 Alan Norris (England) | 3 – 5 | (England) Glen Durrant 103.50 |
| 98.88 Peter Wright (Scotland) | 5 – 0 | (Australia) Corey Cadby 90.21 |

13 November

| 97.49 Corey Cadby (Australia) | 5 – 4 | (England) Glen Durrant 96.80 |
| 98.68 Peter Wright (Scotland) | 5 – 4 | (England) Alan Norris 92.50 |

==== Group F ====
| Pos. | Player | P | W | L | LF | LA | +/− | Pts | Status |
|---|---|---|---|---|---|---|---|---|---|
| 1 | (England) Stephen Bunting (Q) | 3 | 3 | 0 | 15 | 10 | +5 | 6 | Q |
| 2 | (England) Dave Chisnall (7) | 3 | 1 | 2 | 11 | 12 | −1 | 2 | Q |
| 3 | (England) Scott Mitchell (BDO) | 3 | 1 | 2 | 11 | 13 | −2 | 2 | Eliminated |
| 4 | (Netherlands) Jeffrey de Zwaan (Q) | 3 | 1 | 2 | 12 | 14 | −2 | 2 | Eliminated |

11 November

| 93.30 Dave Chisnall (England) | 5 – 2 | (England) Scott Mitchell 100.02 |
| 97.02 Stephen Bunting (England) | 5 – 4 | (Netherlands) Jeffrey de Zwaan 96.69 |

12 November

| 85.43 Dave Chisnall (England) | 2 – 5 | (England) Stephen Bunting 90.55 |
| 91.80 Jeffrey de Zwaan (Netherlands) | 3 – 5 | (England) Scott Mitchell 86.95 |

13 November

| 96.58 Dave Chisnall (England) | 4 – 5 | (Netherlands) Jeffrey de Zwaan 98.08 |
| 97.28 Stephen Bunting (England) | 5 – 4 | (England) Scott Mitchell 93.50 |

==== Group G ====
| Pos. | Player | P | W | L | LF | LA | +/− | Pts | Status |
|---|---|---|---|---|---|---|---|---|---|
| 1 | (Austria) Mensur Suljović (6) | 3 | 3 | 0 | 15 | 10 | +5 | 6 | Q |
| 2 | (England) Michael Smith | 3 | 2 | 1 | 14 | 12 | +2 | 4 | Q |
| 3 | (England) James Wilson (Q) | 3 | 1 | 2 | 12 | 12 | 0 | 2 | Eliminated |
| 4 | (England) Mark McGeeney (BDO) | 3 | 0 | 3 | 8 | 15 | −7 | 0 | Eliminated |

11 November

| 93.83 Mensur Suljović (Austria) | 5 – 2 | (England) Mark McGeeney 81.03 |
| 97.13 Michael Smith (England) | 5 – 3 | (England) James Wilson 91.91 |

12 November

| 102.84 Mensur Suljović (Austria) | 5 – 4 | (England) Michael Smith 100.79 |
| 92.47 James Wilson (England) | 5 – 2 | (England) Mark McGeeney 85.22 |

13 November

| 98.48 Mensur Suljović (Austria) | 5 – 4 | (England) James Wilson 99.72 |
| 104.90 Michael Smith (England) | 5 – 4 | (England) Mark McGeeney 100.40 |

==== Group H ====
| Pos. | Player | P | W | L | LF | LA | +/− | Pts | Status |
|---|---|---|---|---|---|---|---|---|---|
| 1 | (Scotland) Gary Anderson (3) | 3 | 3 | 0 | 15 | 6 | +9 | 6 | Q |
| 2 | (Netherlands) Berry van Peer | 3 | 2 | 1 | 11 | 13 | −2 | 4 | Q |
| 3 | (Scotland) Cameron Menzies (BDO) | 3 | 1 | 2 | 12 | 12 | 0 | 2 | Eliminated |
| 4 | (Australia) Simon Whitlock | 3 | 0 | 3 | 8 | 15 | −7 | 0 | Eliminated |

11 November

| 96.55 Gary Anderson (Scotland) | 5 – 3 | (Scotland) Cameron Menzies 91.98 |
| 86.48 Simon Whitlock (Australia) | 4 – 5 | (Netherlands) Berry van Peer 87.00 |

12 November

| 111.79 Gary Anderson (Scotland) | 5 – 1 | (Netherlands) Berry van Peer 68.85 |
| 90.31 Simon Whitlock (Australia) | 2 – 5 | (Scotland) Cameron Menzies 90.79 |

13 November

| 104.73 Gary Anderson (Scotland) | 5 – 2 | (Australia) Simon Whitlock 96.43 |
| 81.19 Berry van Peer (Netherlands) | 5 – 4 | (Scotland) Cameron Menzies 81.52 |

=== Knockout stage ===
Second round (best of 19 legs); 15–16 November
A1 | (Netherlands) Michael van Gerwen (1) 104.98 | 10
B2 | (Republic of Ireland) Steve Lennon (Q) 94.27 | 3
B1 | (Netherlands) Raymond van Barneveld (8) 98.30 | 7
A2 | (England) Rob Cross 103.87 | 10
C1 | (England) Phil Taylor (5) 101.04 | 10
D2 | (England) Darren Webster (Q) 88.21 | 4
D1 | (Northern Ireland) Daryl Gurney (4) 94.62 | 10
C2 | (England) James Wade 90.02 | 2
E1 | (England) Glen Durrant (BDO) 99.33 | 10
F2 | (England) Dave Chisnall (7) 96.01 | 8
F1 | (England) Stephen Bunting (Q) 96.64 | 4
E2 | (Scotland) Peter Wright (2) 103.69 | 10
G1 | (Austria) Mensur Suljović (6) 105.84 | 10
H2 | (Netherlands) Berry van Peer 95.39 | 2
H1 | (Scotland) Gary Anderson (3) 106.91 | 10
G2 | (England) Michael Smith 98.18 | 6

Quarter-finals (best of 31 legs); 17–18 November
A1 | (Netherlands) Michael van Gerwen (1) 104.26 | 16
A2 | (England) Rob Cross 102.54 | 13
C1 | (England) Phil Taylor (5) 103.97 | 16
D1 | (Northern Ireland) Daryl Gurney (4) 96.43 | 4
E1 | (England) Glen Durrant (BDO) 92.58 | 10
E2 | (Scotland) Peter Wright (2) 93.68 | 16
G1 | (Austria) Mensur Suljović (6) 94.56 | 12
H1 | (Scotland) Gary Anderson (3) 101.79 | 16

Semi-finals (best of 31 legs); 19 November
A1 | (Netherlands) Michael van Gerwen (1) 106.87 | 16
C1 | (England) Phil Taylor (5) 98.09 | 8
E2 | (Scotland) Peter Wright (2) 100.69 | 16
H1 | (Scotland) Gary Anderson (3) 98.81 | 15

Final (best of 31 legs); 19 November
A1 | (Netherlands) Michael van Gerwen (1) 102.18 | 16
E2 | (Scotland) Peter Wright (2) 97.71 | 12
