= 2017 World Series of Darts Finals =

2017 Ladbrokes World Series of Darts Finals

Tournament information
- Dates: 3–5 November 2017
- Venue: Braehead Arena
- Location: Glasgow
- Country: Scotland
- Organisation(s): PDC
- Format: Legs
- Prize fund: £250,000
- Winner's share: £50,000
- High checkout: 167 (Scotland) Gary Anderson

Champion(s)
- (Netherlands) Michael van Gerwen

The 2017 Ladbrokes World Series of Darts Finals was the third staging of the tournament, organised by the Professional Darts Corporation. The tournament took place in the Braehead Arena, Glasgow, Scotland, between 3–5 November 2017. It featured a field of 24 players.

Michael van Gerwen was the defending champion after beating Peter Wright 11–9 in the previous year's final, and he retained his title for a third consecutive year, by defeating Gary Anderson 11–6 in the final.

== Prize money ==
The total prize money increased from £155,000 to £250,000, with the winner's prize being upped from £30,000 to £50,000.

Position (no. of players)		Prize money (Total: £250,000)
Winner	(1)	£50,000
Runner-up	(1)	£25,000
Semi-finalists	(2)	£16,500
Quarter-finalists	(4)	£12,500
Last 16 (second round)	(8)	£7,500
Last 24 (first round)	(8)	£4,000

== Qualification and format ==
The top eight players from the seven World Series events of 2017 are seeded for this tournament (with the exception of Phil Taylor, who declined his invite for the tournament). They are:

- 2017 Dubai Duty Free Darts Masters
- 2017 Shanghai Darts Masters
- 2017 US Darts Masters
- 2017 Auckland Darts Masters
- 2017 Melbourne Darts Masters
- 2017 Perth Darts Masters
- 2017 German Darts Masters

In addition, four players were invited as international invitations, as were the next four highest ranked players from the PDC Order of Merit following the 2017 World Grand Prix on 9 October 2017. Another eight places were awarded in a qualifying event that took place in Barnsley on 9 October 2017.

The following players qualify for the tournament:

World Series Top 8

(seedings after all events)

1. (Scotland) Gary Anderson (runner-up)
2. (Netherlands) Michael van Gerwen (winner)
3. (Scotland) Peter Wright (quarter-finals)
4. (Netherlands) Raymond van Barneveld (second round)
5. (England) James Wade (semi-finals)
6. (Northern Ireland) Daryl Gurney (semi-finals)
7. (Australia) Kyle Anderson (second round)
8. (Wales) Gerwyn Price (quarter-finals)

PDC Order of Merit Qualifiers
- (England) Adrian Lewis (first round)
- (Austria) Mensur Suljović (first round)
- (England) Dave Chisnall (first round)
- (Netherlands) Jelle Klaasen (first round)

PDC International Invitations
- (Australia) Simon Whitlock (second round)
- (Australia) Corey Cadby (second round)
- (England) Michael Smith (first round)
- (Germany) Max Hopp (second round)

PDC Tour Card Qualifiers
- (England) Rob Cross (quarter-finals)
- (Belgium) Dimitri Van den Bergh (quarter-finals)
- (England) Chris Dobey (second round)
- (England) Justin Pipe (second round)
- (Wales) Jonny Clayton (first round)
- (Wales) Mark Webster (first round)
- (Netherlands) Jan Dekker (first round)
- (England) Simon Stevenson (second round)

== Draw ==
First round (best of 11 legs); 3 November
RQ	(Austria) Mensur Suljović 94.14	3
Q	(England) Chris Dobey 90.63	6
RQ	(Netherlands) Jelle Klaasen 87.02	3
WC	(Australia) Corey Cadby 87.54	6
Q	(Netherlands) Jan Dekker 83.83	3
Q	(England) Simon Stevenson 90.21	6
WC	(England) Michael Smith 97.44	1
Q	(Belgium) Dimitri Van den Bergh 100.11	6
RQ	(England) Adrian Lewis 87.73	2
WC	(Germany) Max Hopp 85.84	6
Q	(England) Rob Cross 97.93	6
Q	(Wales) Jonny Clayton 88.16	1
WC	(Australia) Simon Whitlock 78.22	6
Q	(Wales) Mark Webster 77.44	3
RQ	(England) Dave Chisnall 95.23	5
Q	(England) Justin Pipe 93.17	6

Second round (best of 11 legs); 4 November
1	(Scotland) Gary Anderson 103.57	6
Q	(England) Chris Dobey 92.81	1
8	(Wales) Gerwyn Price 93.86	6
WC	(Australia) Corey Cadby 94.59	5
5	(England) James Wade 93.24	6
Q	(England) Simon Stevenson 92.67	5
4	(Netherlands) Raymond van Barneveld 90.73	4
Q	(Belgium) Dimitri Van den Bergh 102.00	6
2	(Netherlands) Michael van Gerwen 102.98	6
WC	(Germany) Max Hopp 86.73	1
7	(Australia) Kyle Anderson 97.81	5
Q	(England) Rob Cross 98.70	6
6	(Northern Ireland) Daryl Gurney 103.64	6
WC	(Australia) Simon Whitlock 97.70	3
3	(Scotland) Peter Wright 91.58	6
Q	(England) Justin Pipe 87.33	1

Quarter-finals (best of 19 legs); 5 November
1	(Scotland) Gary Anderson 95.77	10
8	(Wales) Gerwyn Price 90.57	8
5	(England) James Wade 91.69	10
Q	(Belgium) Dimitri Van den Bergh 96.57	6
2	(Netherlands) Michael van Gerwen 108.83	10
Q	(England) Rob Cross 96.84	4
6	(Northern Ireland) Daryl Gurney 96.35	10
3	(Scotland) Peter Wright 97.42	7

Semi-finals (best of 21 legs); 5 November
1	(Scotland) Gary Anderson 94.88	11
5	(England) James Wade 88.66	5
2	(Netherlands) Michael van Gerwen 95.48	11
6	(Northern Ireland) Daryl Gurney 91.71	8

Final (best of 21 legs); 5 November
1	(Scotland) Gary Anderson 100.68	6
2	(Netherlands) Michael van Gerwen 103.30	11
