= 2017 Perth Darts Masters =

Tournament information
- Dates: 25–27 August 2017
- Venue: HBF Stadium
- Location: Perth
- Country: Australia
- Organisation(s): PDC
- Format: Legs
- Prize fund: £60,000
- Winner's share: £20,000
- High checkout: 161 (Australia) Corey Cadby

Champion(s)
- (Scotland) Gary Anderson

The 2017 Perth Darts Masters was the fourth staging of the tournament by the Professional Darts Corporation, as the sixth entry in the 2017 World Series of Darts. The tournament featured 16 players (eight PDC players facing eight regional qualifiers) and was held at the HBF Stadium in Perth, Western Australia between 25–27 August 2017.

Michael van Gerwen was the defending champion after winning 2016 edition, but did not compete as he wished not to be included in the draw after his wife was due to give birth.

Gary Anderson won the title after defeating Raymond van Barneveld 11–7 in the final. Anderson won in his fifth World Series Event final appearance his fifth title, making it a 100% winning ratio in Event Finals.

== Prize money ==
The total prize fund was £60,000.

Position (no. of players)		Prize money (Total: £60,000)
Winner	(1)	£20,000
Runner-up	(1)	£10,000
Semi-finalists	(2)	£5,000
Quarter-finalists	(4)	£2,500
First round	(8)	£1,250

== Qualifiers ==
The eight invited PDC representatives, sorted according to the World Series Order of Merit, were:

1. (Scotland) Gary Anderson (winner)
2. (England) Phil Taylor (quarter-finals)
3. (Scotland) Peter Wright (quarter-finals)
4. (England) James Wade (semi-finals)
5. (Northern Ireland) Daryl Gurney (semi-finals)
6. (Netherlands) Raymond van Barneveld (runner-up)
7. (Australia) Simon Whitlock (quarter-finals)
8. (England) Michael Smith (quarter-finals)

The regional qualifiers are:

Qualification	Player
Wildcard (World number 28)	(Australia) Kyle Anderson (first round)
2017 DPA Order of Merit (First place)	(Australia) Corey Cadby (first round)
2017 DPA Order of Merit (Second place)	(Australia) Rhys Mathewson (first round)
2017 DPA Order of Merit (Third place)	(Australia) Justin Thompson (first round)
DartPlayers New Zealand Qualifier	(New Zealand) Rob Szabo (first round)
Winner of DP Australia Qualifier 1	(Australia) Adam Rowe (first round)
Winner of DP Australia Qualifier 2	(New Zealand) Koha Kokiri (first round)
Winner of DownUnder Qualifier	(Australia) Darren Hayes (first round)

== Draw ==
First round (best of 11 legs); 25 August
1	(Scotland) Gary Anderson 96.47	6
(New Zealand) Rob Szabo 78.25	1
(Australia) Simon Whitlock 83.74	6
(Australia) Justin Thompson 80.93	2
4	(England) James Wade 95.94	6
(Australia) Darren Hayes 63.20	0
(England) Michael Smith 88.29	6
(Australia) Adam Rowe 85.50	2
2	(England) Phil Taylor 95.90	6
(Australia) Kyle Anderson 95.64	4
(Netherlands) Raymond van Barneveld 95.35	6
(Australia) Corey Cadby 96.40	5
3	(Scotland) Peter Wright 100.24	6
(Australia) Rhys Mathewson 98.76	2
(Northern Ireland) Daryl Gurney 106.09	6
(New Zealand) Koha Kokiri 95.27	0

Quarter-finals (best of 19 legs); 26 August
1	(Scotland) Gary Anderson 102.38	10
(Australia) Simon Whitlock 98.42	5
4	(England) James Wade 101.05	10
(England) Michael Smith 97.26	5
2	(England) Phil Taylor 93.75	9
(Netherlands) Raymond van Barneveld 94.89	10
3	(Scotland) Peter Wright 99.43	4
(Northern Ireland) Daryl Gurney 97.70	10

Semi-finals (best of 21 legs); 27 August
1	(Scotland) Gary Anderson 98.41	11
4	(England) James Wade 90.07	9
(Netherlands) Raymond van Barneveld 91.55	11
(Northern Ireland) Daryl Gurney 91.60	10

Final (best of 21 legs); 27 August
1	(Scotland) Gary Anderson 103.98	11
(Netherlands) Raymond van Barneveld 101.87	7
