= 2018 German Darts Championship =

Tournament information
- Dates: 31 August–2 September 2018
- Venue: Halle 39
- Location: Hildesheim
- Country: Germany
- Organisation(s): PDC
- Format: Legs
- Prize fund: £135,000
- Winner's share: £25,000
- High checkout: 170 (England) Joe Cullen (third round)

Champion(s)
- (Netherlands) Michael van Gerwen

The 2018 German Darts Championship was the tenth of thirteen PDC European Tour events on the 2018 PDC Pro Tour. The tournament took place at Halle 39, Hildesheim, Germany from 31 August–2 September 2018. It featured a field of 48 players and £135,000 in prize money, with £25,000 going to the winner.

Peter Wright was the defending champion after defeating Michael van Gerwen 6–3 in the 2017 final, but he withdrew the day before the event.

Van Gerwen won the event for the second time and his 27th European Tour title in total, beating James Wilson 8–6 in the final, and only dropping seven legs in the whole tournament.

During the event, Dave Chisnall broke the record for the highest ever 3-dart average on the European Tour, with an average of 118.66 in his 6–0 defeat of Mark Webster in the second round.

== Prize money ==
This is how the prize money is divided:

| Stage (num. of players) | | Prize money |
|---|---|---|
| Winner | (1) | £25,000 |
| Runner-up | (1) | £10,000 |
| Semi-finalists | (2) | £6,000 |
| Quarter-finalists | (4) | £4,000 |
| Third round losers | (8) | £3,000 |
| Second round losers | (16) | £2,000 |
| First round losers | (16) | £1,000 |
| Total | £135,000 | |

Prize money will count towards the PDC Order of Merit, the ProTour Order of Merit and the European Tour Order of Merit, with one exception: should a seeded player lose in the second round (last 32), their prize money will not count towards any Orders of Merit, although they still receive the full prize money payment.

== Qualification and format ==
The top 16 entrants from the PDC ProTour Order of Merit on 8 June will automatically qualify for the event and will be seeded in the second round.

The remaining 32 places will go to players from five qualifying events – 18 from the UK Qualifier (held in Wigan on 15 June), eight from the West/South European Qualifier (held on 30 August), four from the Host Nation Qualifier (held on 30 August), one from the Nordic & Baltic Qualifier (held on 26 May) and one from the East European Qualifier (held on 25 August).

Peter Wright, who would have been the number 2 seed, withdrew from the tournament prior to the draw. Steve Beaton, the highest-ranked qualifier, was promoted to 16th seed, which meant an extra place was made available in the Host Nation Qualifier.

The following players will take part in the tournament:

Top 16
1. (Netherlands) Michael van Gerwen (champion)
2. (England) Michael Smith (third round)
3. (England) Rob Cross (quarter-finals)
4. (Northern Ireland) Daryl Gurney (third round)
5. (England) Joe Cullen (semi-finals)
6. (Austria) Mensur Suljović (semi-finals)
7. (Wales) Jonny Clayton (second round)
8. (England) Ian White (second round)
9. (England) Dave Chisnall (quarter-finals)
10. (England) James Wade (second round)
11. (England) Darren Webster (third round)
12. (Wales) Gerwyn Price (second round)
13. (England) Mervyn King (second round)
14. (Australia) Simon Whitlock (second round)
15. (England) Stephen Bunting (second round)
16. (England) Steve Beaton (second round)

UK Qualifier
- (Australia) Kyle Anderson (second round)
- (England) Ricky Evans (second round)
- (England) Adrian Lewis (quarter-finals)
- (England) James Wilson (runner-up)
- (England) Richard North (first round)
- (England) Terry Jenkins (third round)
- (England) Andy Boulton (first round)
- (England) Darren Johnson (second round)
- (England) Justin Pipe (first round)
- (England) Ross Smith (first round)
- (England) David Pallett (first round)
- (England) Josh Payne (second round)
- (England) Lee Bryant (first round)
- (Wales) Mark Webster (second round)
- (Scotland) Robert Thornton (third round)
- (England) Ted Evetts (first round)
- (England) Andrew Gilding (second round)

West/South European Qualifier
- (Netherlands) Ron Meulenkamp (quarter-finals)
- (Netherlands) Jermaine Wattimena (first round)
- (Netherlands) Danny Noppert (first round)
- (Spain) Cristo Reyes (second round)
- (Netherlands) Jan Dekker (third round)
- (Austria) Michael Rasztovits (third round)
- (Netherlands) Vincent van der Voort (first round)
- (Spain) Toni Alcinas (first round)

Host Nation Qualifier
- (Germany) Robert Marijanović (first round)
- (Germany) Martin Schindler (third round)
- (Germany) Max Hopp (first round)
- (Germany) Christopher Hänsch (first round)
- (Germany) Nico Blum (first round)

Nordic & Baltic Qualifier
- (Lithuania) Darius Labanauskas (first round)

East European Qualifier
- (Poland) Krzysztof Ratajski (second round)

== Draw ==
First round (best of 11 legs); 31 August
(Spain) Cristo Reyes 82.86 | 6
(Germany) Nico Blum 75.86 | 3
(Germany) Martin Schindler 81.63 | 6
(England) Justin Pipe 82.51 | 4
(England) Terry Jenkins 85.41 | 6
(England) Ross Smith 78.08 | 3
(England) Ted Evetts 82.30 | 5
(Wales) Mark Webster 89.48 | 6
(England) Andy Boulton 88.68 | 3
(England) Josh Payne 91.30 | 6
(Lithuania) Darius Labanauskas 83.90 | 3
(Netherlands) Jan Dekker 83.98 | 6
(England) Darren Johnson 92.02 | 6
(Germany) Christopher Hänsch 78.03 | 0
(England) Adrian Lewis 87.29 | 6
(Spain) Toni Alcinas 87.17 | 5
(Poland) Krzysztof Ratajski 93.95 | 6
(Netherlands) Vincent van der Voort 92.50 | 4
(England) Richard North 95.73 | 2
(Netherlands) Ron Meulenkamp 102.31 | 6
(Netherlands) Jermaine Wattimena 84.71 | 5
(England) James Wilson 86.40 | 6
(Scotland) Robert Thornton 87.15 | 6
(Germany) Robert Marijanović 82.78 | 5
(England) Andrew Gilding 91.98 | 6
(Germany) Max Hopp 93.89 | 2
(England) Ricky Evans 89.57 | 6
(Netherlands) Danny Noppert 81.47 | 3
(England) Lee Bryant 81.99 | 4
(Australia) Kyle Anderson 89.62 | 6
(Austria) Michael Rasztovits 90.62 | 6
(England) David Pallett 88.88 | 4

Second round (best of 11 legs); 1 September
1 | (Netherlands) Michael van Gerwen 109.98 | 6
(Spain) Cristo Reyes 88.78 | 0
16 | (England) Steve Beaton 79.43 | 2
(Germany) Martin Schindler 83.72 | 6
8 | (England) Ian White 92.69 | 5
(England) Terry Jenkins 90.34 | 6
9 | (England) Dave Chisnall 118.66 | 6
(Wales) Mark Webster 85.25 | 0
5 | (England) Joe Cullen 94.76 | 6
(England) Josh Payne 90.44 | 4
12 | (Wales) Gerwyn Price 92.43 | 4
(Netherlands) Jan Dekker 92.69 | 6
4 | (Northern Ireland) Daryl Gurney 99.34 | 6
(England) Darren Johnson 92.79 | 3
13 | (England) Mervyn King 85.69 | 5
(England) Adrian Lewis 84.55 | 6
2 | (England) Michael Smith 97.21 | 6
(Poland) Krzysztof Ratajski 87.50 | 1
15 | (England) Stephen Bunting 96.07 | 5
(Netherlands) Ron Meulenkamp 98.36 | 6
7 | (Wales) Jonny Clayton 88.48 | 5
(England) James Wilson 91.46 | 6
10 | (England) James Wade 91.18 | 3
(Scotland) Robert Thornton 86.85 | 6
6 | (Austria) Mensur Suljović 96.90 | 6
(England) Andrew Gilding 90.37 | 2
11 | (England) Darren Webster 92.93 | 6
(England) Ricky Evans 93.75 | 2
3 | (England) Rob Cross 108.13 | 6
(Australia) Kyle Anderson 96.11 | 5
14 | (Australia) Simon Whitlock 85.99 | 3
(Austria) Michael Rasztovits 92.09 | 6

Third round (best of 11 legs); 2 September
1 | (Netherlands) van Gerwen 102.48 | 6
(Germany) Schindler 89.79 | 0
(England) Jenkins 92.58 | 4
9 | (England) Chisnall 95.85 | 6
5 | (England) Cullen 98.62 | 6
(Netherlands) Dekker 100.59 | 5
4 | (Northern Ireland) Gurney 92.33 | 5
(England) Lewis 90.75 | 6
2 | (England) M. Smith 91.20 | 4
(Netherlands) Meulenkamp 90.35 | 6
(England) Wilson 95.21 | 6
(Scotland) Thornton 95.16 | 3
6 | (Austria) Suljović 103.54 | 6
11 | (England) D. Webster 84.50 | 2
3 | (England) Cross 102.19 | 6
(Austria) Rasztovits 96.38 | 4

Quarter-finals (best of 11 legs); 2 September
1 | (Netherlands) van Gerwen 96.29 | 6
9 | (England) Chisnall 88.60 | 1
5 | (England) Cullen 92.45 | 6
(England) Lewis 80.47 | 1
(Netherlands) Meulenkamp 76.71 | 2
(England) Wilson 92.41 | 6
6 | (Austria) Suljović 100.13 | 6
3 | (England) Cross 92.72 | 2

Semi-finals (best of 13 legs); 2 September
1 | (Netherlands) van Gerwen 111.93 | 7
5 | (England) Cullen 99.30 | 0
(England) Wilson 100.42 | 7
6 | (Austria) Suljović 101.76 | 4

Final (best of 15 legs); 2 September
1 | (Netherlands) van Gerwen 101.24 | 8
(England) Wilson 93.30 | 6
