= 2017 Melbourne Darts Masters =

Tournament information
- Dates: 18–20 August 2017
- Venue: Hisense Arena
- Location: Melbourne
- Country: Australia
- Organisation(s): PDC
- Format: Legs
- Prize fund: £60,000
- Winner's share: £20,000
- High checkout: 170 (Scotland) Gary Anderson

Champion(s)
- (England) Phil Taylor

The 2017 Melbourne Darts Masters was the inaugural staging of the tournament by the Professional Darts Corporation, as a fifth entry in the 2017 World Series of Darts. The tournament featured 16 players (eight PDC players facing eight regional qualifiers) and was being held at the Hisense Arena in Melbourne between 18–20 August 2017.

Phil Taylor is the champion, defeating Peter Wright 11–8 in the final. This would become Phil Taylor's last televised title due to his retirement after the 2018 World Championship.

== Prize money ==
The total prize fund was £60,000.

Position (no. of players)		Prize money (Total: £60,000)
Winner	(1)	£20,000
Runner-up	(1)	£10,000
Semi-finalists	(2)	£5,000
Quarter-finalists	(4)	£2,500
First round	(8)	£1,250

== Qualifiers ==
The eight invited PDC representatives, sorted according to the World Series Order of Merit, are:

1. (Scotland) Gary Anderson (quarter-finals)
2. (Netherlands) Raymond van Barneveld (first round)
3. (England) James Wade (quarter-finals)
4. (Scotland) Peter Wright (runner-up)
5. (England) Phil Taylor (winner)
6. (Northern Ireland) Daryl Gurney (semi-finals)
7. (England) Michael Smith (quarter-finals)
8. (Australia) Simon Whitlock (semi-finals)

The regional qualifiers are:

Qualification	Player
Wildcard (World number 28)	(Australia) Kyle Anderson (first round)
2017 DPA Order of Merit (First place)	(Australia) Corey Cadby (quarter-finals)
2017 DPA Order of Merit (Second place)	(Australia) Rhys Mathewson (first round)
2017 DPA Order of Merit (Third place)	(Australia) Justin Thompson (first round)
DartPlayers New Zealand Qualifier	(New Zealand) Cody Harris (first round)
Winner of DPA Qualifier 1	(Australia) David Platt (first round)
Winner of DPA Qualifier 2	(Australia) Dave Marland (first round)
Winner of DPA Qualifier 3	(New Zealand) Koha Kokiri (first round)

== Draw ==
First round (best of 11 legs); 18 August
1	(Scotland) Gary Anderson 103.98	6
(Australia) Justin Thompson 82.43	2
(Northern Ireland) Daryl Gurney 94.93	6
(Australia) Dave Marland 73.30	0
4	(Scotland) Peter Wright 87.82	6
(Australia) Rhys Mathewson 76.59	2
(England) Michael Smith 90.24	6
(Australia) David Platt 89.63	3
2	(Netherlands) Raymond van Barneveld 85.71	4
(Australia) Corey Cadby 93.42	6
(England) Phil Taylor 98.01	6
(New Zealand) Cody Harris 91.85	3
3	(England) James Wade 84.30	6
(New Zealand) Koha Kokiri 82.80	3
(Australia) Simon Whitlock 107.69	6
(Australia) Kyle Anderson 103.37	1

Quarter-finals (best of 19 legs); 19 August
1	(Scotland) Gary Anderson 91.25	8
(Northern Ireland) Daryl Gurney 96.21	10
4	(Scotland) Peter Wright 89.82	10
(England) Michael Smith 88.88	9
(Australia) Corey Cadby 91.22	9
(England) Phil Taylor 97.31	10
3	(England) James Wade 91.97	9
(Australia) Simon Whitlock 94.40	10

Semi-finals (best of 21 legs); 20 August
(Northern Ireland) Daryl Gurney 92.68	4
4	(Scotland) Peter Wright 95.27	11
(England) Phil Taylor 93.97	11
(Australia) Simon Whitlock 90.58	4

Final (best of 21 legs); 20 August
4	(Scotland) Peter Wright 99.74	8
(England) Phil Taylor 98.88	11
