= Koha Kokiri =

New Zealand darts player

Personal information
- Nickname: "The Kiwi"
- Born: 7 June 1976 (age 50) Porirua, New Zealand
- Home town: Perth, Australia

Sport
- Sport: Darts
- Playing since: 1996
- Darts: 23 Gram Shot! Darts
- Laterality: Right-handed
- Walk-on music: "Regulate" by Warren G ft. Nate Dogg

Organisation (see split in darts)
- BDO: 2008–2012
- PDC: 2012–

PDC premier events – best performances
- World Championship: Last 64: 2016

Other tournament wins
- Years
New Zealand Open	2009
Oceanic Masters	2015
Ted Clements Open	2010
West Coast Classic	2016
DPA World Series Qualifier	2017
DPA Pro Tour	2017, 2019
DPA Western Australia Bubble	2021 (x3)
Medal record
Men's Darts
Representing New Zealand
WDF Asia-Pacific Cup
Gold medal – first place	2010 Tokyo	Men's singles
Gold medal – first place	2010 Tokyo	Team event

Koha Kokiri (born 7 June 1976) is a New Zealand-born Australian professional darts player.

== Career ==
Kokiri won the men's singles at the 2010 WDF Asia-Pacific Cup in Tokyo, seeing off Morihiro Hashimoto 4–1 in the final.

Kokiri defeated Warren Parry in the final of the 2015 Oceanic Masters to qualify for the 2016 PDC World Darts Championship. He competed with the former world champion Steve Beaton in the first round, losing 3–0. Kokiri won the 2016 West Coast Classic by beating Adam Rowe and lost 6–3 in the final of the Perth Open to David Platt. He played in the Perth Darts Masters, but was knocked out 6–1 by Dave Chisnall in the opening round. Who played in the 2017 Melbourne Darts Masters but knocked out 6–3 by James Wade and the 2017 Perth Darts Masters but was knocked out stages by 6–0 by Daryl Gurney.

== World Championship record ==
=== PDC ===
- 2016: First round (lost to Steve Beaton 0–3)
