= 2016 Perth Darts Masters =

Tournament information
- Dates: 25–27 August 2016
- Venue: Perth Convention and Exhibition Centre
- Location: Perth
- Country: Australia
- Organisation(s): PDC
- Format: Legs
- High checkout: 160 (England) Dave Chisnall

Champion(s)
- (Netherlands) Michael van Gerwen

The 2016 Perth Darts Masters was the third staging of the tournament by the Professional Darts Corporation, as the sixth and final entry in the 2016 World Series of Darts. The tournament featured 16 players (eight top PDC Players facing eight regional qualifiers) and was held at the Perth Convention and Exhibition Centre in Perth, Western Australia from 25–27 August 2017.

Phil Taylor was the two-times defending champion after defeating James Wade 11–7 in the last year's final, but lost in the first round to the regional qualifier Corey Cadby.

Michael van Gerwen won the title by defeating Dave Chisnall 11–4 in the final.

== Qualifiers ==
The eight seeded PDC players were:

1. (Scotland) Gary Anderson (quarter-finals)
2. (Netherlands) Michael van Gerwen (winner)
3. (England) Phil Taylor (first round)
4. (England) Adrian Lewis (quarter-finals)
5. (England) James Wade (quarter-finals)
6. (England) Dave Chisnall (runner-up)
7. (Scotland) Peter Wright (semi-finals)
8. (Netherlands) Raymond van Barneveld (semi-finals)

The Oceanic qualifiers were:

- (Australia) Simon Whitlock (first round)
- (Australia) Kyle Anderson (first round)
- (Australia) Corey Cadby (quarter-finals)
- (Australia) Adam Rowe (first round)
- (Australia) Kim Lewis (first round)
- (Australia) David Platt (first round)
- (New Zealand) Rob Szabo (first round)
- (New Zealand) Koha Kokiri (first round)

== Draw ==
First round (best of 11 legs); 25 August
1	(Scotland) Gary Anderson 97.40	6
(Australia) Kim Lewis 79.64	3
(England) Dave Chisnall 95.64	6
(New Zealand) Koha Kokiri 86.71	1
4	(England) Adrian Lewis 91.49	6
(Australia) David Platt 88.30	3
(Netherlands) Raymond van Barneveld 92.43	6
(Australia) Simon Whitlock 89.35	2
2	(Netherlands) Michael van Gerwen 94.78	6
(Australia) Kyle Anderson 91.35	4
(England) James Wade 95.94	6
(New Zealand) Rob Szabo 86.93	0
3	(England) Phil Taylor 111.65	2
(Australia) Corey Cadby 103.58	6
(Scotland) Peter Wright 90.94	6
(Australia) Adam Rowe 87.12	4

Quarter-finals (best of 19 legs); 26 August
1	(Scotland) Gary Anderson 97.50	7
(England) Dave Chisnall 95.95	10
4	(England) Adrian Lewis 101.64	8
(Netherlands) Raymond van Barneveld 101.34	10
2	(Netherlands) Michael van Gerwen 98.96	10
(England) James Wade 99.25	8
(Australia) Corey Cadby 109.57	2
(Scotland) Peter Wright 109.83	10

Semi-finals (best of 21 legs); 27 August
(England) Dave Chisnall 104.81	11
(Netherlands) Raymond van Barneveld 100.70	8
2	(Netherlands) Michael van Gerwen 97.22	11
(Scotland) Peter Wright 97.75	5

Final (best of 21 legs); 27 August
(England) Dave Chisnall 94.22	4
2	(Netherlands) Michael van Gerwen 99.63	11

== Broadcasting ==
The tournament was available in the following countries on these channels:

Country	Channel
Australia	Fox Sports
New Zealand	Sky Sport (New Zealand)
Asia	Fox Channel Asia
United Kingdom	ITV4 (delayed coverage)
Netherlands	RTL 7
Middle East/North Africa	OSN
(Republic of Ireland) Ireland	Eir Sports
China	PPTV (online)
Bulgaria	Nova Sport
