= James Wilson (darts player) =

English darts player} (born 1972)

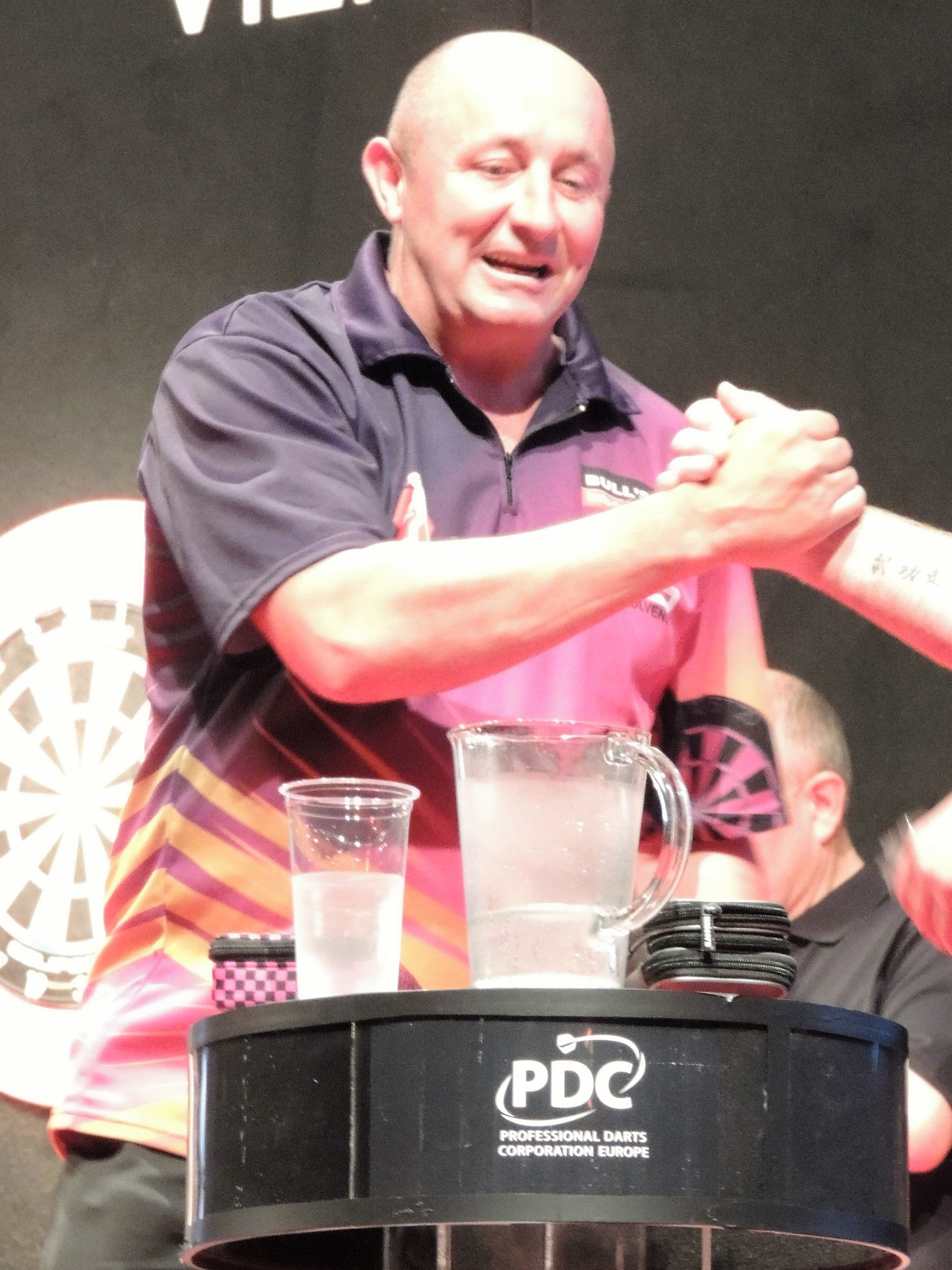
- Wilson in 2019

Personal information
- Nickname: "Jammy Dodger"
- Born: 25 February 1972 (age 54) Weston-super-Mare, England
- Home town: Huddersfield, England

Sport
- Sport: Darts
- Playing since: 1978
- Darts: 22g Bull's Germany Signature
- Laterality: Right-handed
- Walk-on music: "Daydream Believer" by The Monkees

Organisation (see split in darts)
- BDO: 2007–2015
- PDC: 2015–2024 (Tour Card: 2015–2023)

WDF major events – best performances
- World Championship: Quarter-final: 2014
- World Masters: Runner-up: 2013
- World Trophy: Winner (1): 2014
- Finder Masters: Winner (1): 2013

PDC premier events – best performances
- World Championship: Last 32: 2018
- World Matchplay: Last 32: 2017, 2018
- World Grand Prix: Quarter-final: 2018
- UK Open: Last 32: 2015, 2016
- Grand Slam: Group Stages: 2016, 2017
- European Championship: Quarter-final: 2016
- PC Finals: Last 32: 2018, 2019

Other tournament wins
- Years
England GP of Darts Grand Final	2012
England GP of Darts Huddersfield	2012
Jersey Classic	2012
Lancashire Classic Open	2012
Wales Classic	2013
Yorkshire Classic	2014

James Wilson (born 25 February 1972) is an English darts player who competed in Professional Darts Corporation (PDC) and British Darts Organisation (BDO) events.

Wilson won two BDO major titles: the 2013 Zuiderduin Masters and the 2014 World Trophy.

In the PDC, Wilson reached two premier event quarter-finals: at the 2016 European Championship and the 2018 World Grand Prix.

== Career ==
=== BDO ===
Wilson first rose to prominence in 2012 by winning several tournaments, rising to number four in the world and reaching the quarter-finals of the Winmau World Masters. Despite this, he was unseeded on his debut appearance at the World Championship and was drawn against top seed Stephen Bunting in round one, taking a 2–1 lead before eventually losing 2–3. Wilson followed up on his form in 2013, rising to second in the world and reaching the final of the World Masters beating Jan Dekker and Robbie Green en route to a 7–0 loss to Bunting. Later that year Wilson demolished Bunting 5–1 in the final of the Zuiderduin Masters. Wilson therefore entered the World Championship as the second seed, and beat former world champion Christian Kist in the first round then Scott Mitchell in the second round, to set up a quarter-final against Alan Norris, which Norris won 5–2 despite Wilson averaging 99.06, hitting three 11 dart legs (one of which included a bounce-out) and 14 180s.

In February 2014, Wilson found himself as de facto number one after Stephen Bunting's change-over to the rival Professional Darts Corporation. He subsequently won his first major at the inaugural BDO World Trophy. Wins over Richie George, Rick Hofstra, Jeffrey de Graaf and Paul Jennings saw Wilson progress to the final where he defeated Ross Montgomery 13–11 for a winner's cheque of £30,000.

Wilson entered the 2014 World Masters as the number one seed but suffered a shock first round exit, losing 3–0 in sets to Mark McGeeney. He also entered the 2015 BDO World Darts Championship as the number one seed but also lost in the first round to Sweden's Peter Sajwani.

=== PDC ===
The day after being knocked out of the 2015 BDO World Championship, Wilson announced on his Twitter page that he had signed up to the Professional Darts Corporation's Qualifying School with the intention of earning a tour card. On the third of four qualifying days Wilson won a two-year membership with the PDC by beating Nathan Aspinall 5–2 in the final round. Wilson's first PDC major was the UK Open and he beat Mark Frost 5–0 and Ricky Evans 9–4 to reach the fourth round, where he lost 9–7 against Kyle Anderson. In May he knocked out Steve Brown, Michael Smith, Jamie Lewis and Darren Johnson at the ninth Players Championship event of the year to reach his first PDC quarter-final and was defeated 6–3 by Gary Anderson. Wilson qualified for three European Tour events during the year, but was eliminated in the second round of each.

In 2016, Wilson lost to Kyle Anderson in the fourth round of the UK Open for the second year in a row, this time 9–2. Later in the year he reached the semi-finals of three successive Pro Tour events, before his first PDC final arrived at the 15th Players Championship event with wins over Steve Hine, James Richardson, Steve West, Vincent van der Voort, Raymond van Barneveld and Jermaine Wattimena. From 3–3, world number one Michael van Gerwen moved away to defeat Wilson 6–3. The pair met in the second round of the World Grand Prix with Van Gerwen winning 3–0 in sets. At the European Championship, Wilson beat Kim Huybrechts 6–3 and Mervyn King 10–9 to play in his first major PDC quarter-final, which he lost 10–7 to James Wade. He won a place at the Grand Slam through the qualifier and saw off Dave Chisnall 5–2 in his opening game, before losing 5–3 to Wade. He needed a win over Jamie Hughes to progress to the knockout stage and led 4–2, but went on to lose 5–4. Wilson also played in the Players Championship Finals for the first time after finishing 11th on the Order of Merit, but was knocked out 6–2 by Vincent Kamphuis in the first round.

Wilson topped the Pro Tour Order of Merit for non-qualified players to qualify for the 2017 World Championship. In his first appearance at the event he lost 3–0 to Kim Huybrechts in the opening round. He played 4 other major tournaments in 2017, namely 2nd round of UK Open 2017, and was eliminated in 1st rounds of World Matchplay 2017 and Players Championship Finals 2017. For the second time in a row, he qualified for Grand Slam of Darts, but was unable to make it through the round robin. Towards the end of the year Wilson broke into top 32 of PDC Order of Merit and qualified as 32nd seed for the 2018 PDC World Championship.

Wilson faced Krzysztof Ratajski in the first round of the World Championship and won 3–1 in sets. In the second round he lost 0–4 to the world number one, Michael van Gerwen. In 2018, Wilson continued in his progress in PDC and settled himself comfortably in top 32 of PDC Order of Merit. He lost again in the 2nd round of 2018 UK Open, as well as the first round of 2018 World Matchplay. His best tournament of the year came at the World Grand Prix 2018, where he reached the second PDC major quarterfinal of his career. He defeated former major title winners, Simon Whitlock (2–1 in sets) in the first round and former World Champion Adrian Lewis (3–2) in the second round. He lost in the quarter-finals to Peter Wright 2–3 in a very tight match. He later qualified for European Championship and defeated Jonny Clayton in the first round before losing to Max Hopp in the second round. He made it to the second round Players Championship Finals, by defeating Dimitri Van den Bergh. During the year Wilson changed back his nickname from "Lethal Biscuit" to "Jammy Dodger".

He entered the 2019 PDC World Championship as 26th seed and in the new format, he started in the second round. He lost to William O'Connor 2–3 in sets. At the 2019 UK Open Wilson received a bye to the 4th round, where he lost to James Wade and 1–10. Wilson's form dropped during the year and the only other major he qualified for was the Players Championship Finals, where he achieved a shock 6–5 win over the 4th seed, Peter Wright. In the second round Wilson was whitewashed by Chris Dobey.

Despite falling out of top 32 in the PDC Order of Merit, Wilson qualified for World Championship through the PDC Pro Tour Order of Merit, from 27th place. In the first round he lost to Nico Kurz 1–3 in sets. Wilson received a bye into the 3rd round of the 2020 UK Open and won against Ted Evetts 6–4 before losing to 4–10 to Michael Smith. James struggled during the year, having problems with both shoulder and eye injury. He was unable to qualify for any other major tournament that year and also failed to qualify for the 2021 World Championship. That caused him major fall down in the rankings and he ended the year on 64th position on the PDC Order of Merit, narrowly retaining his Tour card.

Wilson received a bye to the 3rd round of 2021 UK Open, where he lost 1–6 to Keegan Brown. Yet again, he was unable to qualify for any other major tournaments and was dropping down the rankings. In November he qualified PDPA Qualifier for the 2022 World Championship via the PDPA qualifier and kept a theoretical chance to retain his Tour card. After losing 1–3 against Luke Woodhouse in the 1st round, Wilson ended the year on 91st place of PDC Order of Merit and lost his Tour card.

In January 2022 Wilson entered PDC UK Q-School and automatically qualified for Final Stage. On the first day of the tournament, he regained his Tour card for 2 years after a win over Cameron Menzies 6-1.

== World Championship results ==
=== BDO ===
- 2013: First round (lost to Stephen Bunting 2–3)
- 2014: Quarter-finals (lost to Alan Norris 2–5)
- 2015: First round (lost to Peter Sajwani 1–3)

=== PDC ===
- 2017: First round (lost to Kim Huybrechts 0–3)
- 2018: Second round (lost to Michael van Gerwen 0–4)
- 2019: Second round (lost to William O'Connor 2–3)
- 2020: First round (lost to Nico Kurz 1–3)
- 2022: First round (lost to Luke Woodhouse 1–3)

== Career finals ==
=== BDO major finals: 3 (2 titles) ===
Legend
World Masters (0–1)
Zuiderduin Masters (1–0)
World Trophy (1–0)

Outcome	No.	Year	Championship	Opponent in the final	Score
Runner-up	1.	2013	World Masters	(England) Stephen Bunting	0–7 (s)
Winner	1.	2013	Zuiderduin Masters	(England) Stephen Bunting	5–1 (s)
Winner	2.	2014	BDO World Trophy	(Scotland) Ross Montgomery	13–11 (l)

=== PDC European tour finals: 1 ===
Legend
Other (0–1)

Outcome	No.	Year	Championship	Opponent in the final	Score
Runner-up	1.	2018	German Darts Championship	Michael van Gerwen	6–8 (l)

== Performance timeline ==
BDO

Tournament	2007	2010	2011	2012	2013	2014	2015
BDO World Championship	Did not participate				1R	QF	1R
BDO World Trophy	Not held					W	PDC
Winmau World Masters	1R	DNP	2R	QF	F	5R	PDC
Zuiderduin Masters	Did not participate			RR	W	RR	PDC

PDC

Tournament	2015	2016	2017	2018	2019	2020	2021	2022	2023
PDC World Championship	BDO	DNQ	1R	2R	2R	1R	DNQ	1R	DNQ
UK Open	4R	4R	2R	2R	4R	4R	3R	2R	3R
World Matchplay	DNQ		1R	1R	DNQ				
World Grand Prix	DNQ	2R	DNQ	QF	DNQ				
European Championship	DNQ	QF	DNQ	2R	DNQ				
Grand Slam of Darts	DNQ	RR	RR	DNQ					
Players Championship Finals	DNQ	1R	1R	2R	2R	DNQ			
Year-end ranking	70	36	31	26	38	64	91	122	97

PDC European Tour

Season	1	2	3	4	5	6	7	8	9	10	11	12	13
2015	GDC; 2R	GDT; DNQ	GDM; DNQ	DDM; DNQ	IDO; 2R	EDO; DNQ	EDT; 2R	EDM; DNQ	EDG; DNQ				
2016	DDM; DNQ	GDM; 3R	GDT; DNQ	EDM; DNQ	ADO; 1R	EDO; DNQ	IDO; SF	EDT; DNQ	EDG; 3R	GDC; DNQ			
2017	GDC; DNQ	GDM; DNQ	GDO; DNQ	EDG; 1R	GDT; QF	EDM; 2R	ADO; 1R	EDO; DNQ	DDM; 1R	GDG; DNQ	IDO; DNQ	EDT; 2R	
2018	EDO; DNQ	GDG; 1R	GDO; DNQ	ADO; DNQ	EDG; DNQ	DDM; 2R	GDT; 1R	DDO; DNQ	EDM; 2R	GDC; F	DDC; 1R	IDO; 2R	EDT; DNQ
2019	EDO; DNQ	GDC; 3R	GDG; DNQ	GDO; 1R	ADO; DNQ	EDG; DNQ	DDM; DNQ	DDO; DNQ	CDO; DNQ	ADC; 3R	EDM; DNQ	IDO; DNQ	GDT; DNQ
2022	IDO; DNP	GDC; DNQ	GDG; 1R	ADO; DNQ	EDO; DNQ	CDO; DNQ	EDG; DNQ	DDC; DNQ	EDM; 2R	HDT; DNQ	GDO; DNQ	BDO; DNQ	GDT; DNQ
2023	BSD; DNQ	EDO; DNQ	IDO; 1R	GDG; DNQ	ADO; DNQ	DDC; DNQ	BDO; DNP	CDO; DNP	EDG; DNQ	EDM; 2R	GDO; DNQ	HDT; DNQ	GDC; 1R

PDC Players Championships

Season	1	2	3	4	5	6	7	8	9	10	11	12	13	14	15	16	17	18	19	20	21	22	23	24	25	26	27	28	29	30	31	32	33	34
2016	BAR; 2R	BAR; 1R	BAR; 4R	BAR; 2R	BAR; 2R	BAR; 4R	BAR; 2R	COV; 2R	COV; 2R	BAR; 2R	BAR; 1R	BAR; SF	BAR; SF	BAR; QF	BAR; F	BAR; 1R	DUB; 1R	DUB; 2R	BAR; 2R	BAR; QF														
2017	BAR; 2R	BAR; 1R	BAR; 3R	BAR; 3R	MIL; 2R	MIL; 1R	BAR; 1R	BAR; 3R	WIG; 1R	WIG; 2R	MIL; 1R	MIL; SF	WIG; 2R	WIG; 2R	BAR; 1R	BAR; 2R	BAR; 1R	BAR; 1R	DUB; 3R	DUB; SF	BAR; 2R	BAR; F												
2018	BAR; 4R	BAR; 3R	BAR; 2R	BAR; 2R	MIL; 2R	MIL; SF	BAR; QF	BAR; QF	WIG; 2R	WIG; QF	MIL; 3R	MIL; 1R	WIG; 4R	WIG; 1R	BAR; 1R	BAR; 2R	BAR; 4R	BAR; 4R	DUB; SF	DUB; 2R	BAR; 3R	BAR; QF												
2019	WIG; 2R	WIG; 1R	WIG; 1R	WIG; 1R	BAR; 1R	BAR; 2R	WIG; 1R	WIG; 2R	BAR; 1R	BAR; 3R	BAR; 1R	BAR; 2R	BAR; 4R	BAR; 2R	BAR; 1R	BAR; 1R	WIG; SF	WIG; 1R	BAR; 1R	BAR; 1R	HIL; 2R	HIL; 2R	BAR; 3R	BAR; QF	BAR; 2R	BAR; 2R	DUB	DUB	BAR	BAR				
2020	BAR; 1R	BAR; 1R	WIG; 1R	WIG; 3R	WIG; 1R	WIG; 1R	BAR; 1R	BAR; 1R	MIL; 3R	MIL; 3R	MIL; 2R	MIL; 3R	MIL; 1R	NIE; 1R	NIE; 1R	NIE; 2R	NIE; 1R	NIE; 1R	COV; 3R	COV; 2R	COV; 1R	COV; 3R	COV; 2R											
2021	BOL; 2R	BOL; 1R	BOL; 2R	BOL; 2R	MIL; 1R	MIL; 1R	MIL; 3R	MIL; 1R	NIE; DNP				MIL; 2R	MIL; 1R	MIL; 2R	MIL; 1R	COV; 1R	COV; 1R	COV; 2R	COV; 3R	BAR; 3R	BAR; 1R	BAR; 1R	BAR; 1R	BAR; 1R	BAR; 1R	BAR; 1R	BAR; 1R	BAR; 3R	BAR; 1R				
2022	BAR; 1R	BAR; 1R	WIG; 1R	WIG; 1R	BAR; 3R	BAR; 1R	Did not participate							WIG; QF	WIG; 3R	NIE; 1R	NIE; 2R	BAR; 1R	BAR; 1R	BAR; 3R	BAR; 1R	BAR; 2R	BAR; 1R	BAR; 1R	BAR; 1R	BAR; 3R	BAR; 3R	BAR; 1R	BAR; 1R	BAR; 3R				
2023	BAR; 2R	BAR; 2R	BAR; 1R	BAR; 2R	BAR; 1R	DNP			WIG; 1R	WIG; 1R	LEI; 1R	DNP			LEI; 1R	LEI; 1R	HIL; DNP	HIL; 2R	BAR; 1R	BAR; 3R	BAR; 1R	BAR; 1R	BAR; 2R	BAR; 2R	BAR; 1R	BAR; 1R	BAR; 2R	BAR; 2R	BAR; 1R	BAR; 1R				

Performance Table Legend
W	Won the tournament	F	Finalist	SF	Semifinalist	QF	Quarterfinalist	#R; RR; Prel.	Lost in # round Round-robin; Preliminary round	DQ	Disqualified
DNQ	Did not qualify	DNP	Did not participate	WD	Withdrew	NH	Tournament not held	#R; RR; Prel.	Lost in # round Round-robin; Preliminary round	NYF	Not yet founded
