= Berry van Peer =

Dutch darts player (born 1996)

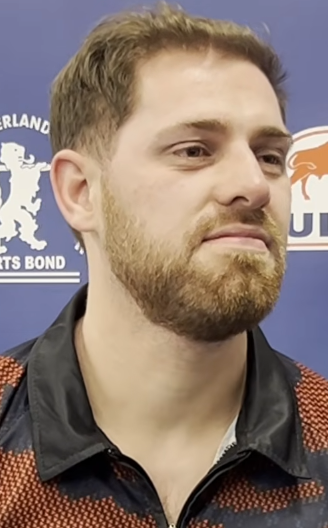
- Van Peer in 2026

Personal information
- Nickname: "Bionic"
- Born: 23 August 1996 (age 30) Roosendaal, Netherlands
- Home town: Sprundel, Netherlands

Sport
- Sport: Darts
- Playing since: 2010
- Darts: 23g Dynasty
- Laterality: Right-handed
- Walk-on music: "Bara bada bastu" by KAJ

Organisation (see split in darts)
- BDO: 2013−2015
- PDC: 2015−2025 (Tour Card: 2016–2017, 2021–2022, 2024–2025)
- WDF: 2013−2015, 2023

WDF major events – best performances
- World Masters: Last 144: 2014, 2015
- Dutch Open: Winner (1): 2023

PDC premier events – best performances
- World Championship: Last 32: 2024
- UK Open: Last 96: 2016, 2022, 2025
- Grand Slam: Last 16: 2017
- PC Finals: Last 32: 2016

Other tournament wins
- Years
Swedish Masters	2023
Open Rivierenland	2023
PDC Development Tour (×4)
2015 (×2), 2018, 2020
PDC Challenge Tour (×5)
2019, 2023 (×4)
Medal record
Men's Darts
Representing Netherlands
WDF World Cup
Gold medal – first place	2023 Esbjerg	Men's singles
Gold medal – first place	2023 Esbjerg	Men's team
Gold medal – first place	2023 Esbjerg	Men's overall

Berry van Peer (born 23 August 1996) is a Dutch darts player who competes in World Darts Federation (WDF) events and previously competed in Professional Darts Corporation (PDC) events. He won his first WDF major title at the 2023 Dutch Open and won the Swedish Masters and WDF World Cup Singles the same year. Van Peer has previously competed in PDC secondary tours, winning five PDC Challenge Tour titles, including four in 2023, and four PDC Development Tours.

Van Peer was runner-up at the 2016 PDC World Youth Championship.

== Career ==
Van Peer won two events on the PDC Development Tour in Coventry in April 2015. He went on to finish third in the 2015 Development Tour Order of Merit and was subsequently awarded a two-year PDC Pro Tour card for 2016 and 2017.

Van Peer qualified for the UK Open and Players Championship Finals in 2016, losing in the second round of each event. He also reached the final of the 19th Development Tour tournament of the year and was defeated 4−3 by Mike de Decker. Van Peer qualified for the final of the PDC World Youth Championship. He played Corey Cadby in the final in Minehead, England in November, but lost 6−2.

Whilst playing at the 2017 Grand Slam of Darts, Van Peer suffered a severe case of dartitis during his match with two time World Champion Gary Anderson. Former player and now Sky Sports pundit Wayne Mardle has talked about his struggles with dartitis and has thrown his support behind the young tyro, even touting him as a future champion despite his struggles with the condition. Despite his visible struggles on stage, Van Peer defeated both Simon Whitlock and Cameron Menzies in the group stage, before losing out to Mensur Suljović in the second round.

Van Peer enjoyed somewhat of a comeback year during 2023, claiming four challenge tour titles to earn a spot at both the 2023 Grand Slam of Darts and the 2024 PDC World Darts Championship. At the latter of the two, he defeated both Luke Woodhouse and Josh Rock to reach the third round on debut, where he was defeated by Damon Heta.

== World Championship results ==
=== PDC ===
- 2024: Third round (lost to Damon Heta 3–4)

== Performance timeline ==
Van Peer's performance timeline is as follows:

=== BDO ===
Tournament	2014	2015
BDO Ranked televised events
World Masters	2R	2R

=== WDF ===
Tournament	2023	2026
WDF Ranked platinum/major events
Dutch Open	W	4R

=== PDC ===
Tournament	2015	2016	2017	2018	2019	2020	2021	2022	2023	2024	2025
PDC Ranked televised events
World Championship	Did not qualify									3R	DNQ
World Masters	Did not qualify										Prel.
UK Open	DNQ	2R	DNQ			2R	1R	3R	DNQ	2R	3R
Grand Slam	DNQ		2R	DNQ					RR	DNQ	
Players Championship Finals	DNQ	2R	Did not qualify								
PDC Non-ranked events
World Youth Championship	2R	F	2R	2R	2R	RR	DNP				
Career statistics
Season-end ranking (PDC)	-	79	68	-	168	-	145	91	79	97	93

==== European Tour ====
Tournament	2022	2023	2024	2025
German Grand Prix	2R	3R	DNQ	
Austrian Open	1R	DNQ		1R
European Open	2R	Did not qualify		
Dutch Championship	DNQ	3R	DNQ	1R
Belgian Open	DNQ		2R	DNQ

==== Players Championships ====
Season	1	2	3	4	5	6	7	8	9	10	11	12	13	14	15	16	17	18	19	20	21	22	23	24	25	26	27	28	29	30	31	32	33	34
2019 (Note: Not a Tour card holder)	Did not participate																				HIL; 3R	HIL; 1R	BAR; 2R	BAR; 1R	BAR; 3R	BAR; 1R	DUB; 1R	DUB; 1R	BAR; 2R	BAR; 2R				
2020	Did not participate																																	
2021	BOL; 1R	BOL; 1R	BOL; 3R	BOL; 1R	MIL; 2R	MIL; 1R	MIL; 1R	MIL; 1R	NIE; 1R	NIE; SF	NIE; 2R	NIE; 1R	MIL; 1R	MIL; 1R	MIL; 1R	MIL; 1R	COV; 1R	COV; 1R	COV; 1R	COV; 1R	BAR; 1R	BAR; 1R	BAR; 1R	BAR; 2R	BAR; 2R	BAR; 1R	BAR; 1R	BAR; 1R	BAR; 1R	BAR; 1R				
2022	BAR; 3R	BAR; 1R	WIG; 1R	WIG; 2R	BAR; 1R	BAR; 1R	NIE; 1R	NIE; 1R	BAR; 2R	BAR; 3R	BAR; 2R	BAR; 1R	BAR; 2R	WIG; 1R	WIG; 1R	NIE; 2R	NIE; 2R	BAR; 2R	BAR; 1R	BAR; 1R	BAR; 1R	BAR; 1R	BAR; 1R	BAR; 1R	BAR; 1R	BAR; 4R	BAR; 2R	BAR; 4R	BAR; 1R	BAR; 4R				
2023	Did not participate						HIL; 1R	HIL; 2R	WIG; 2R	WIG; 3R	Did not participate				LEI; QF	DNP			BAR; 3R	BAR; 1R	BAR; 1R	DNP			BAR; 1R	BAR; 1R	BAR; 2R	BAR; 1R	BAR; 1R	BAR; 1R				
2024	WIG; 3R	WIG; 3R	LEI; 3R	LEI; 2R	HIL; 2R	HIL; 3R	LEI; 2R	LEI; 1R	HIL; 2R	HIL; 2R	HIL; 1R	HIL; 1R	MIL; 1R	MIL; 1R	MIL; 3R	MIL; 2R	MIL; 2R	MIL; 1R	MIL; 1R	WIG; 2R	WIG; 2R	MIL; 2R	MIL; 1R	WIG; 1R	WIG; 3R	WIG; 1R	WIG; 1R	WIG; 2R	LEI; 1R	LEI; 1R				
2025	WIG; 1R	WIG; 2R	ROS; 1R	ROS; 1R	LEI; 2R	LEI; 2R	HIL; 1R	HIL; 3R	LEI; 1R	LEI; 3R	LEI; 2R	LEI; 1R	ROS; 2R	ROS; 1R	HIL; 1R	HIL; DNP	LEI; 1R	LEI; 1R	LEI; 1R	LEI; 1R	LEI; 3R	HIL; 2R	HIL; 1R	MIL; 2R	MIL; 1R	HIL; 1R	HIL; 1R	LEI; 1R	LEI; 1R	LEI; 1R	WIG; 1R	WIG; 1R	WIG; 2R	WIG; 2R

Performance Table Legend
W	Won the tournament	F	Finalist	SF	Semifinalist	QF	Quarterfinalist	#R; RR; Prel.	Lost in # round Round-robin; Preliminary round	DQ	Disqualified
DNQ	Did not qualify	DNP	Did not participate	WD	Withdrew	NH	Tournament not held	#R; RR; Prel.	Lost in # round Round-robin; Preliminary round	NYF	Not yet founded
