= Welsh Classic =

Tournament information
- Venue: Showdome (1998); Lyons Holiday Park (2002–2013); Pontins (2019–2023); Pontins Sand Bay (2024)
- Location: Porthcawl (1998); Rhyl (2002–2013); Prestatyn (2019–2023); Kewstoke (2024)
- Country: Wales; England
- Established: 1991
- Organisation(s): WDF
- Format: Legs
- Prize fund: £7,410

Current champion(s)
- Cliff Prior (men's); Beau Greaves (women's); Mason Teese (youth's)

The Welsh Classic, currently known as the Red Dragon Welsh Classic for sponsorship reasons, is a darts tournament that has been held since 1991. It is sanctioned by the World Darts Federation (WDF).

The current champions, from the 2024 events, are: Cliff Prior (men's), Beau Greaves (women's), and Mason Teese (youth).

== List of tournaments ==
=== Men's ===
Year	Champion (average in final)	Score	Runner-up (average in final)	Total Prize Money	Champion	Runner-up
1991	(Wales) Peter Locke	beat	(England) Mark Holden	?	?	?
1992	(England) Ronnie Baxter	beat	(England) Chris Mason	?	?	?
1993	(England) Ronnie Baxter	beat	(England) Paul Whitworth	?	?	?
1994	(England) Chris Mason	beat	(England) Andy Jenkins	?	?	?
1995	(Wales) Richie Burnett	beat	(Wales) Sean Palfrey	?	?	?
1996	(Wales) Richie Burnett	beat	(England) Colin Monk	?	?	?
1997	(England) Martin Adams	beat	(England) Ian White	?	?	?
1998	(Wales) Chris Bailey	beat	(England) Gary Spedding		1000	450
1999	(Wales) Richie Burnett	beat	(England) Martin Adams	?	?	?
2000	(England) Steve Coote	beat	(England) Gary Spedding	?	?	?
2001	(Wales) Ritchie Davies	beat	(Northern Ireland) Mitchell Crooks	?	?	?
2002	(England) Paul Carter	beat	(England) Darryl Fitton	?	?	?
2003	(Wales) Ken Thomas	beat	(England) Tony O'Shea	?	?	?
2004	(England) Alan Green	5-3	(England) Robbie Green	£5,000	£2,500	£800
2005	(Scotland) Mike Veitch (88.71)	4-1	(England) Tony Eccles (85.65)	£5,000	£2,500	£800
2006	(England) Darryl Fitton (82.26)	2-0	(Netherlands) Michael van Gerwen (82.44)	£5,000	£2,500	£800
2007	(Wales) Mark Webster	4-1	(England) Ian White	£4,200	£2,000	£800
2008	(England) Garry Thompson	4-1	(Netherlands) Joey ten Berge	£4,200	£2,000	£800
2009	(England) Tony O'Shea	5-2	(England) Alan Norris	£4,200	£2,000	£800
2010	(Wales) Jamie Lewis	5-4	(England) Scott Marsh	£4,200	£2,000	£800
2012	(England) Stephen Bunting	5-4	(Scotland) Gary Stone	£4,200	£2,000	£800
2013	(England) James Wilson	6-4	(England) Glen Durrant	£4,200	£2,000	£800
2019	(England) Dave Parletti	6–4	(England) Martin Adams	£7,600	£3,000	£1,200
2021	Thibault Tricole 96.30	6 – 2	Jim Williams 95.27	£4,200	£2,000	£800
2022	Barry Copeland 84.87	6 – 5	Graham Hall 84.25	£5,320	£1,500	£750
2023	Connor Levett 81.83	5 – 4	Antony Allen 77.87	£9,000	£3,000	£1,200
2024				£5,040	£1,500	£700

=== Women's ===
Year	Champion	Av.	Score	Runner-Up	Av.	Prize Money			Venue
Year	Champion	Av.	Score	Runner-Up	Av.	Total	Ch.	R.-Up	Venue
1998	(Northern Ireland) Denise Cassidy	n/a	beat	(Wales) Sandra Greatbatch	n/a	£1,000	£500	£250	(Wales) Showdome, Porthcawl
2002	(England) Sally Smith	n/a	beat	(Wales) Sandra Greatbatch	n/a	n/a	n/a	n/a	(Wales) Lyons Holiday Park, Rhyl
2004	(Wales) Jan Robbins	n/a	5 – 0	(England) Emma Pearce	n/a	n/a	n/a	n/a	(Wales) Lyons Holiday Park, Rhyl
2005	(England) Trina Gulliver	78.75	4 – 1	(England) Clare Bywaters	73.68	n/a	n/a	n/a	(Wales) Lyons Holiday Park, Rhyl
2006	(Wales) Julie Gore	65.94	3 – 2	(England) Linda Hindmarch	60.09	n/a	n/a	n/a	(Wales) Lyons Holiday Park, Rhyl
2007	(Netherlands) Francis Hoenselaar	n/a	beat	(Wales) Lorraine Abley	n/a	n/a	n/a	n/a	(Wales) Lyons Holiday Park, Rhyl
2008	(Netherlands) Francis Hoenselaar (2)	n/a	3 – 0	(England) Dee Bateman	n/a	n/a	n/a	n/a	(Wales) Lyons Holiday Park, Rhyl
2009	(England) Dee Bateman	n/a	4 – 2	(England) Stephanie Smee	n/a	n/a	n/a	n/a	(Wales) Lyons Holiday Park, Rhyl
2010	(England) Lisa Ashton	n/a	4 – 2	(Wales) Julie Gore	n/a	n/a	n/a	n/a	(Wales) Lyons Holiday Park, Rhyl
2012	(Russia) Anastasia Dobromyslova	n/a	4 – 2	(England) Karen Lawman	n/a	£2,080	£800	£400	(Wales) Lyons Holiday Park, Rhyl
2013	(England) Deta Hedman	n/a	5 – 3	(England) Fallon Sherrock	n/a	£2,080	£800	£400	(Wales) Lyons Holiday Park, Rhyl
2019	Beau Greaves	83.52	5 – 2	(Russia) Anastasia Dobromyslova	69.39	£2,500	£1,000	£500	(Wales) Pontins, Prestatyn
2021	Beau Greaves (2)	71.27	5 – 2	(England) Kirsty Hutchinson	65.29	£2,500	£1,000	£500	(Wales) Pontins, Prestatyn
2022	Fallon Sherrock	80.14	5 – 4	Rhian O'Sullivan	78.01	£2,285	£750	£375	(Wales) Pontins, Prestatyn
2023	Beau Greaves (3)	87.35	5 – 1	Noa-Lynn van Leuven	77.38	£2,600	£1,000	£400	(Wales) Pontins, Prestatyn
2024						£2,170	£750	£350	(England) Pontins Sand Bay, North Somerset

=== Youth's ===
Year	Champion	Av.	Score	Runner-Up	Av.	Prize Money			Venue
Year	Champion	Av.	Score	Runner-Up	Av.	Total	Ch.	R.-Up	Venue
2013	(England) Kallum Graham	n/a	beat	(England) Casey Gallagher	n/a	–	–	–	(Wales) Lyons Holiday Park, Rhyl
2019	Lewy Williams	n/a	3 – 1	James Beeton	n/a	£200	£100	£50	(Wales) Pontins, Prestatyn
2021	Luke Littler	83.50	4 – 0	Ieuan Halsall	69.75	£200	£100	£50	(Wales) Pontins, Prestatyn
2022	Luke Littler (2)	103.68	4 – 2	Kieran Thompson	83.67	£200	£100	£50	(Wales) Pontins, Prestatyn
2023	Thomas Banks	78.67	4 – 2	Daniel Stephenson	73.69	£200	£100	£50	(Wales) Pontins, Prestatyn
2024						£200	£100	£50	(England) Pontins Sand Bay, North Somerset

== See also ==
- List of BDO ranked tournaments
