= 2017 Auckland Darts Masters =

2017 Auckland Darts Masters, presented by Burger King & TAB

Tournament information
- Dates: 11–13 August 2017
- Venue: The Trusts Arena
- Location: Auckland
- Country: New Zealand
- Organisation(s): PDC
- Format: Legs
- Prize fund: £60,000
- Winner's share: £20,000
- High checkout: 164 Kyle Anderson

Champion(s)
- (Australia) Kyle Anderson

The 2017 Auckland Darts Masters, presented by Burger King & TAB was the third staging of the tournament by the Professional Darts Corporation, as the fourth entry in the 2017 World Series of Darts. The tournament featured 16 players (eight PDC players facing eight regional qualifiers) and was held at The Trusts Arena in Auckland, New Zealand between 11 and 13 August 2017.

Gary Anderson was the defending champion after winning the second edition of the tournament, defeating Adrian Lewis 11–7 in the final, but lost in the first round to Australia's Kyle Anderson 6–4.

Kyle Anderson went on to win his first televised title after defeating compatriot Corey Cadby 11–10 in the final. He became only the 5th player to win a World Series of Darts event after Michael van Gerwen, Phil Taylor, Gary Anderson and Adrian Lewis, as well as being the first regional qualifier to win an event. The final was also the first World Series of Darts final without an invited player.

== Prize money ==
The total prize fund was £60,000.

Position (no. of players)		Prize money (Total: £60,000)
Winner	(1)	£20,000
Runner-up	(1)	£10,000
Semi-finalists	(2)	£5,000
Quarter-finalists	(4)	£2,500
First round	(8)	£1,250

== Qualifiers ==
The eight invited PDC representatives, sorted according to the World Series Order of Merit, were:

1. (Scotland) Gary Anderson (first round)
2. (Scotland) Peter Wright (first round)
3. (Netherlands) Raymond van Barneveld (quarter-finals)
4. (England) James Wade (semi-finals)
5. (Northern Ireland) Daryl Gurney (quarter-finals)
6. (England) Phil Taylor (semi-finals)
7. (England) Michael Smith (quarter-finals)
8. (Australia) Simon Whitlock (quarter-finals)

The regional qualifiers were:

Qualification	Player
Wildcard (World number 28)	(Australia) Kyle Anderson (winner)
Wildcard (NZ World Championship representative)	(New Zealand) Cody Harris (first round)
2017 DPNZ Order of Merit (First place)	(New Zealand) Rob Szabo (first round)
2017 DPNZ Order of Merit (Second place)	(New Zealand) Warren Parry (first round)
DartPlayers Australia Qualifier	(Australia) Corey Cadby (runner-up)
Winner of DPNZ Qualifier 1	(New Zealand) Mark Cleaver (first round)
Winner of DPNZ Qualifier 2	(Australia) Rob Modra (first round)
Winner of DPNZ Qualifier 3	(New Zealand) Darren Herewini (first round)

== Draw ==
First round (best of 11 legs); 11 August
1	(Scotland) Gary Anderson 98.73	4
(Australia) Kyle Anderson 102.91	6
(Australia) Simon Whitlock 87.90	6
(New Zealand) Cody Harris 84.69	4
4	(England) James Wade 87.00	6
(New Zealand) Mark Cleaver 83.84	2
(Northern Ireland) Daryl Gurney 90.45	6
(Australia) Rob Modra 77.66	2
2	(Scotland) Peter Wright 90.52	4
(Australia) Corey Cadby 95.11	6
(England) Michael Smith 103.66	6
(New Zealand) Rob Szabo 79.37	0
3	(Netherlands) Raymond van Barneveld 90.82	6
(New Zealand) Warren Parry 76.06	4
(England) Phil Taylor 102.31	6
(New Zealand) Darren Herewini 88.96	4

Quarter-finals (best of 19 legs); 12 August
(Australia) Kyle Anderson 94.65	10
(Australia) Simon Whitlock 91.32	9
4	(England) James Wade 100.75	10
(Northern Ireland) Daryl Gurney 98.70	7
(Australia) Corey Cadby 100.17	10
(England) Michael Smith 96.66	5
3	(Netherlands) Raymond van Barneveld 98.36	9
(England) Phil Taylor 96.63	10

Semi-finals (best of 21 legs); 13 August
(Australia) Kyle Anderson 93.79	11
4	(England) James Wade 93.50	4
(Australia) Corey Cadby 94.79	11
(England) Phil Taylor 94.24	8

Final (best of 21 legs); 13 August
(Australia) Kyle Anderson 95.36	11
(Australia) Corey Cadby 96.63	10
