= 2018 World Grand Prix (darts) =

2018 Unibet World Grand Prix

Tournament information
- Dates: 30 September–6 October 2018
- Venue: Citywest Hotel
- Location: Dublin, Ireland
- Organisation(s): Professional Darts Corporation (PDC)
- Format: Sets "Double in, Double out"
- Prize fund: £400,000
- Winner's share: £100,000
- High checkout: 164 Raymond van Barneveld

Champion(s)
- Michael van Gerwen (NED)

The 2018 Unibet World Grand Prix was the 21st staging of the World Grand Prix. It was held from 30 September to 6 October 2018 at the Citywest Hotel in Dublin, Ireland.

The defending champion Daryl Gurney lost to Michael van Gerwen 1–4 in the semi-finals.

Notably during the tournament, Dave Chisnall hit the highest ever losing average in a World Grand Prix match, when he averaged 97.78 in his 3–1 defeat in the quarter-finals to Michael van Gerwen.

Van Gerwen went on to lift his fourth World Grand Prix title, defeating Peter Wright 5–2 in the final.

== Prize money ==
The total prize money remained at £400,000. The following is the breakdown of the fund:

Position (num. of players)		Prize money (Total: £400,000)
Winner	(1)	£100,000
Runner-up	(1)	£45,000
Semi-finalists	(2)	£23,500
Quarter-finalists	(4)	£15,000
Second round losers	(8)	£8,500
First round losers	(16)	£5,000

== Qualification ==
The field of 32 players was made up from the top 16 on the PDC Order of Merit and the top 16 non-qualified players from the ProTour Order of Merit. The top eight players were seeded in the tournament. The following players qualified for the tournament:

PDC Order of Merit (1–16) (Top 8 seeded)

1. (Netherlands) Michael van Gerwen (champion)
2. (Scotland) Peter Wright (runner-up)
3. (England) Rob Cross (first round)
4. (Scotland) Gary Anderson (quarter-finals)
5. (Northern Ireland) Daryl Gurney (semi-finals)
6. (Austria) Mensur Suljović (semi-finals)
7. (Australia) Simon Whitlock (first round)
8. (England) Dave Chisnall (quarter-finals)
9. (England) Michael Smith (first round)
10. (England) James Wade (first round)
11. (England) Ian White (second round)
12. (Wales) Gerwyn Price (quarter-finals)
13. (Netherlands) Raymond van Barneveld (second round)
14. (England) Darren Webster (second round)
15. (England) Joe Cullen (first round)
16. (England) Adrian Lewis (second round)

Pro Tour

1. (Wales) Jonny Clayton (first round)
2. (England) James Wilson (quarter-finals)
3. (England) Stephen Bunting (first round)
4. (Germany) Max Hopp (first round)
5. (England) Mervyn King (first round)
6. (England) Steve West (first round)
7. (Netherlands) Jermaine Wattimena (second round)
8. (Belgium) Kim Huybrechts (first round)
9. (Scotland) John Henderson (first round)
10. (England) Steve Beaton (second round)
11. (Republic of Ireland) Steve Lennon (first round)
12. (Netherlands) Danny Noppert (first round)
13. (England) Ricky Evans (first round)
14. (England) Josh Payne (first round)
15. (Netherlands) Jeffrey de Zwaan (second round)
16. (Netherlands) Ron Meulenkamp (second round)

== Draw ==
First round (best of 3 sets); 30 September–1 October
1	(Netherlands) Michael van Gerwen 92.97	2
(Republic of Ireland) Steve Lennon 77.84	0
(England) Darren Webster 98.02	2
(England) Stephen Bunting 82.38	0
8	(England) Dave Chisnall 92.03	2
(Germany) Max Hopp 80.34	0
(England) Ricky Evans 78.89	1
(Netherlands) Raymond van Barneveld 91.91	2
5	(Northern Ireland) Daryl Gurney 88.36	2
(Scotland) John Henderson 87.94	0
(Netherlands) Ron Meulenkamp 85.88	2
(England) Joe Cullen 78.54	1
4	(Scotland) Gary Anderson 88.91	2
(Wales) Jonny Clayton 79.12	0
(Netherlands) Jeffrey de Zwaan 97.87	2
(Belgium) Kim Huybrechts 88.45	0
2	(Scotland) Peter Wright 98.02	2
(England) Steve West 89.07	0
(Netherlands) Jermaine Wattimena 82.10	2
(England) Mervyn King 73.84	0
7	(Australia) Simon Whitlock 87.60	1
(England) James Wilson 86.46	2
(England) Michael Smith 89.35	1
(England) Adrian Lewis 89.61	2
6	(Austria) Mensur Suljović 84.27	2
(England) James Wade 76.76	0
(England) Josh Payne 81.70	0
(England) Ian White 83.01	2
3	(England) Rob Cross 76.98	0
(England) Steve Beaton 84.27	2
(Netherlands) Danny Noppert 76.55	0
(Wales) Gerwyn Price 79.15	2

Second round (best of 5 sets); 2–3 October
1	(Netherlands) Michael van Gerwen 91.84	3
(England) Darren Webster 82.32	0
8	(England) Dave Chisnall 87.05	3
(Netherlands) Raymond van Barneveld 76.76	0
5	(Northern Ireland) Daryl Gurney 89.20	3
(Netherlands) Ron Meulenkamp 87.41	2
4	(Scotland) Gary Anderson 90.91	3
(Netherlands) Jeffrey de Zwaan 80.74	0
2	(Scotland) Peter Wright 91.64	3
(Netherlands) Jermaine Wattimena 77.67	0
(England) James Wilson 82.12	3
(England) Adrian Lewis 78.63	2
6	(Austria) Mensur Suljović 92.42	3
(England) Ian White 89.29	0
(England) Steve Beaton 82.32	1
(Wales) Gerwyn Price 85.56	3

Quarter-finals (best of 5 sets); 4 October
1	(Netherlands) Michael van Gerwen 101.54	3
8	(England) Dave Chisnall 97.78	1
5	(Northern Ireland) Daryl Gurney 92.72	3
4	(Scotland) Gary Anderson 78.99	0
2	(Scotland) Peter Wright 87.64	3
(England) James Wilson 85.79	2
6	(Austria) Mensur Suljović 91.19	3
(Wales) Gerwyn Price 84.41	2

Semi-finals (best of 7 sets); 5 October
1	(Netherlands) Michael van Gerwen 97.06	4
5	(Northern Ireland) Daryl Gurney 87.75	1
2	(Scotland) Peter Wright 93.38	4
6	(Austria) Mensur Suljović 92.74	3

Final (best of 9 sets); 6 October
1	(Netherlands) Michael van Gerwen 88.85	5
2	(Scotland) Peter Wright 91.61	2
