= 2016 PDC World Youth Championship =

2016 PDC Unicorn World Youth Championship

Tournament information
- Dates: 16 October 2016; 27 November 2016 (final)
- Venue: Butlins Minehead Resort
- Location: Minehead
- Country: England
- Organisation(s): PDC
- Format: Legs first to 6
- Prize fund: £50,000
- Winner's share: £10,000

Champion(s)
- (Australia) Corey Cadby

The 2016 PDC Unicorn World Youth Championship was the sixth edition of the PDC World Youth Championship, a tournament organised by the Professional Darts Corporation for darts players aged between 16 and 23.

The knock-out stages from the last 64 to the semi-finals were played in Wigan on 16 October 2016. The final took place on 27 November 2016, before the final of the 2016 Players Championship Finals, which was shown live on ITV4.

Max Hopp was the defending champion after defeating Nathan Aspinall 6–5 in the 2015 final, but he lost in the second round to fellow German Martin Schindler.

The final was contested between Dutch player Berry van Peer and Australia's Corey Cadby, with Cadby winning 6–2.

== Prize money ==
Position (no. of players)		Prize money (Total: £50,000)
Winner	(1)	£10,000
Runner-up	(1)	£5,000
Semi-finalists	(2)	£2,500
Quarter-finalists	(4)	£1,500
Third round	(8)	£1,000
Second round	(16)	£500
First round	(32)	£250

== Qualification ==
The tournament will feature 64 players. The top 46 players in the PDC Development Tour Order of Merit automatically qualify for the tournament, with the top eight players being seeded. They were originally joined by 17 international qualifiers, but the Gibraltar qualifier Clayton Otton withdrew. Participation would also be possible for any age-qualified players from the top 32 of the main PDC Order of Merit, but the eligible player Benito van de Pas turned down his place, so the remaining two qualifying places were granted to the Junior Darts Corporation's European Champion, Jim Moston, and their number one ranked player, John Brown.

Should an international qualifier also be ranked high enough in the Development Tour Order of Merit to qualify, further places would be allocated from the Development Tour Order of Merit.

The participants are:

1-48

1. (Wales) Dean Reynolds
2. (England) Ross Twell
3. (England) Aden Kirk
4. (Republic of Ireland) Steve Lennon
5. (England) Adam Hunt
6. (England) Callum Loose
7. (England) Josh Payne
8. (Austria) Rowby-John Rodriguez
9. (Belgium) Dimitri Van den Bergh
10. (Netherlands) Jeffrey de Zwaan
11. (Netherlands) Berry van Peer
12. (Wales) Kurt Parry
13. (Belgium) Mike De Decker
14. (Netherlands) Jimmy Hendriks
15. (England) Keegan Brown
16. (Germany) Max Hopp
17. (England) Aaron Dyer
18. (Belgium) Kenny Neyens
19. (England) Luke Humphries
20. (England) James Hubbard
21. (Scotland) Bradley Kirk
22. (Netherlands) Dirk van Duijvenbode
23. (Wales) Nick Kenny
24. (England) Scott Dale
25. (Australia) Corey Cadby
  (qualifier)
26. (Netherlands) Sven Groen
27. (England) Harry Ward
28. (Netherlands) Kevin de Vries
29. (Netherlands) Ryan de Vreede
30. (England) Charlie Beaumont
31. (Wales) Ronnie Roberts
32. (Denmark) Daniel Jensen
33. (England) Arron Fairweather
34. (England) Liam Devries
35. (Netherlands) John de Kruijf
36. (Scotland) James Young
37. (England) Adam Smith-Neale
38. (England) Josh McCarthy
39. (England) Matthew Dicken
40. (England) Ted Evetts
41. (England) Sam Head
42. (England) Ryan Meikle
43. (England) Thomas Sykes
44. (England) Reece Colley
45. (Germany) Fabian Herz
  (qualifier)
46. (England) Callan Rydz
47. (England) Lee Whitworth
48. (Netherlands) Dylan van Beek

International qualifiers

- (United States) Avery Bozzetti
- (Australia) Corey Cadby
- (Canada) Chris Coulter
- (Republic of Ireland) Jack Faragher
- (Republic of Ireland) Liam Gallagher
- (Germany) Fabian Herz
- (Australia) Robbie King
- (Finland) Aaron Knox
- (Russia) Anton Kolesov
- (South Korea) Dongju Lee
- (Austria) Nico Mandl
- (Spain) Jaime Nunez
- (Gibraltar) ~~Clayton Otton~~ (withdrew)
- (Germany) Martin Schindler
- (Netherlands) Kay Smeets
- (Netherlands) Justin van Tergouw
- (China) Zong Xiao Chen

Age-qualified players from the top 32 of the PDC Order of Merit

- (Netherlands) ~~Benito van de Pas~~ (withdrew)

Alternates from the Junior Darts Corporation

- (England) Jim Moston
- (England) John Brown

Isle of Man qualifiers

- (Isle of Man) Callum Brew

== Draw ==
Preliminary round (best of 11 legs)

- (Isle of Man) Callum Brew 5 – 6 Justin van Tergouw (Netherlands)

First round (best of 11 legs); 16 October
1	(Wales) Dean Reynolds	6
(Netherlands) Justin van Tergouw	0
(Wales) Nick Kenny	2
(England) Adam Smith-Neale	6
(England) Keegan Brown	6
(England) Reece Colley	1
(Belgium) Kenny Neyens	6
(Germany) Fabian Herz	3
8	(Austria) Rowby-John Rodriguez	6
(England) Jim Moston	0
(England) Scott Dale	6
(Wales) Ronnie Roberts	2
(Netherlands) Jimmy Hendriks	6
(Republic of Ireland) Jack Faragher	4
(Canada) Chris Coulter	0
(Spain) Jaime Nunez	6
4	(Republic of Ireland) Steve Lennon	6
(England) Sam Head	4
(England) Josh McCarthy	6
(South Korea) Dongju Lee	1
(Scotland) James Young	5
(Russia) Anton Kolesov	6
(England) Aaron Dyer	6
(Denmark) Daniel Jensen	4
5	(England) Adam Hunt	5
(Netherlands) Sven Groen	6
(Wales) Kurt Parry	6
(Republic of Ireland) Liam Gallagher	3
(England) Thomas Sykes	6
(England) Lee Whitworth	0
(Netherlands) Berry van Peer	6
(Austria) Nico Mandl	3
2	(England) Ross Twell	6
(England) Charlie Beaumont	4
(England) Matthew Dicken	1
(Netherlands) Kay Smeets	6
(Netherlands) Dylan van Beek	5
(China) Zong Xiao Chen	6
(England) James Hubbard	5
(England) John Brown	6
7	(England) Josh Payne	1
(Germany) Max Hopp	6
(Netherlands) Dirk van Duijvenbode	4
(Germany) Martin Schindler	6
(Netherlands) John de Kruijf	1
(Australia) Corey Cadby	6
(England) Luke Humphries	6
(Australia) Robbie King	2
3	(England) Aden Kirk	1
(Belgium) Mike De Decker	6
(Netherlands) Kevin de Vries	2
(England) Ted Evetts	6
(Scotland) Bradley Kirk	6
(England) Ryan Meikle	5
(Netherlands) Jeffrey de Zwaan	6
(Netherlands) Ryan de Vreede	3
6	(England) Callum Loose	6
(England) Arron Fairweather	3
(England) Harry Ward	1
(England) Liam Devries	6
(United States) Avery Bozzetti	3
(Finland) Aaron Knox	6
(Belgium) Dimitri Van den Bergh	6
(England) Callan Rydz	5

Second round (best of 11 legs); 16 October
1	(Wales) Dean Reynolds	6
(England) Adam Smith-Neale	3
(England) Keegan Brown	3
(Belgium) Kenny Neyens	6
8	(Austria) Rowby-John Rodriguez	6
(England) Scott Dale	1
(Netherlands) Jimmy Hendriks	6
(Spain) Jaime Nunez	4
4	(Republic of Ireland) Steve Lennon	6
(England) Josh McCarthy	1
(Russia) Anton Kolesov	6
(England) Aaron Dyer	2
(Netherlands) Sven Groen	3
(Wales) Kurt Parry	6
(England) Thomas Sykes	0
(Netherlands) Berry van Peer	6
2	(England) Ross Twell	6
(Netherlands) Kay Smeets	3
(China) Zong Xiao Chen	5
(England) John Brown	6
(Germany) Max Hopp	5
(Germany) Martin Schindler	6
(Australia) Corey Cadby	6
(England) Luke Humphries	3
(Belgium) Mike De Decker	2
(England) Ted Evetts	6
(Scotland) Bradley Kirk	5
(Netherlands) Jeffrey de Zwaan	6
6	(England) Callum Loose	6
(England) Liam Devries	4
(Finland) Aaron Knox	5
(Belgium) Dimitri Van den Bergh	6

Third round (best of 11 legs); 16 October
1	(Wales) Dean Reynolds	5
(Belgium) Kenny Neyens	6
8	(Austria) Rowby-John Rodriguez	6
(Netherlands) Jimmy Hendriks	4
4	(Republic of Ireland) Steve Lennon	6
(Russia) Anton Kolesov	2
(Wales) Kurt Parry	5
(Netherlands) Berry van Peer	6
2	(England) Ross Twell	4
(England) John Brown	6
(Germany) Martin Schindler	2
(Australia) Corey Cadby	6
(England) Ted Evetts	6
(Netherlands) Jeffrey de Zwaan	1
6	(England) Callum Loose	5
(Belgium) Dimitri Van den Bergh	6

Quarter-finals (best of 11 legs); 16 October
(Belgium) Kenny Neyens	6
8	(Austria) Rowby-John Rodriguez	4
4	(Republic of Ireland) Steve Lennon	5
(Netherlands) Berry van Peer	6
(England) John Brown	2
(Australia) Corey Cadby	6
(England) Ted Evetts	4
(Belgium) Dimitri Van den Bergh	6

Semi-finals (best of 11 legs); 16 October
(Belgium) Kenny Neyens	0
(Netherlands) Berry van Peer	6
(Australia) Corey Cadby	6
(Belgium) Dimitri Van den Bergh	3

Final (best of 11 legs); 27 November
(Netherlands) Berry van Peer	2
(Australia) Corey Cadby	6
