= 2017 European Championship (darts) =

2017 Unibet European Championship

Tournament information
- Dates: 26–29 October 2017
- Venue: Ethias Arena
- Location: Hasselt
- Country: Belgium
- Organisation(s): PDC
- Format: Legs
- Prize fund: £400,000
- Winner's share: £100,000
- Nine-dart finish: (Australia) Kyle Anderson (semi-finals)
- High checkout: 170 (Netherlands) Michael van Gerwen (quarter-finals)

Champion(s)
- (Netherlands) Michael van Gerwen

The 2017 Unibet European Championship was the tenth edition of the Professional Darts Corporation tournament, the European Championship, which saw the top players from the twelve European tour events compete against each other. The tournament took place from 26–29 October 2017 at the Ethias Arena in Hasselt, Belgium.

Michael van Gerwen was the three-time defending champion, having beaten Mensur Suljović 11–1 in the final of the 2016 tournament, and he retained once again to capture his fourth title, by defeating Rob Cross 11–7 in the final.

Notably, Kyle Anderson hit a nine-dart finish in his semi-final defeat to van Gerwen, in which he also missed two match darts to win the match himself.

Former World champions Phil Taylor, Gary Anderson, Raymond van Barneveld and Adrian Lewis were notable absences at the tournament after taking part in none or too few European Tour events to qualify. James Wade was also a notable absence after not winning enough money on the European Tour rankings to qualify.

== Prize money ==
The 2017 European Championship will have a total prize fund of £400,000, equal the amount of the last staging of the tournament. The following is the breakdown of the fund:

Position (no. of players)		Prize money (Total: £425,000)
Winner	(1)	£100,000
Runner-Up	(1)	£40,000
Semi-finalists	(2)	£20,000
Quarter-finalists	(4)	£15,000
Last 16 (second round)	(8)	£10,000
Last 32 (first round)	(16)	£5,000
Nine-dart finish	(1)	£25,000

== Qualification ==
The 2017 tournament continues the new system in terms of qualification of the 2016 edition: The top 32 players from the European Tour Order of Merit, which is solely based on prize money won in the twelve European tour events during the season, qualifying for the tournament.

New regulations affected the prize money counting for seeds at all European Tour Events: If a seeded player loses in the second round (seeds enter already at second stage of the events), they still receive the full prize money payment, but their prize money will not count towards any Orders of Merit.

The following players will take part in the tournament, with the top 8 players being seeds:

1. (Netherlands) Michael van Gerwen (winner)
2. (Scotland) Peter Wright (quarter-finals)
3. (England) Michael Smith (quarter-finals)
4. (Austria) Mensur Suljović (quarter-finals)
5. (Netherlands) Jelle Klaasen (second round)
6. (England) Rob Cross (runner-up)
7. (England) Joe Cullen (first round)
8. (Australia) Simon Whitlock (quarter-finals)
9. (England) Dave Chisnall (second round)
10. (Netherlands) Benito van de Pas (second round)
11. (Belgium) Kim Huybrechts (first round)
12. (Northern Ireland) Daryl Gurney (semi-finals)
13. (England) Mervyn King (first round)
14. (Wales) Gerwyn Price (second round)
15. (Spain) Cristo Reyes (first round)
16. (England) Ian White (second round)
17. (England) Stephen Bunting (second round)
18. (Poland) Krzysztof Ratajski (first round)
19. (England) Alan Norris (second round)
20. (Netherlands) Vincent van der Voort (first round)
21. (Germany) Martin Schindler (first round)
22. (Netherlands) Christian Kist (first round)
23. (Scotland) John Henderson (first round)
24. (Australia) Kyle Anderson (semi-finals)
25. (Belgium) Dimitri Van den Bergh (first round)
26. (England) Steve Beaton (first round)
27. (England) Nathan Aspinall (first round)
28. (Belgium) Ronny Huybrechts (first round)
29. (Netherlands) Jan Dekker (first round)
30. (England) James Richardson (first round)
31. (England) Darren Webster (first round)
32. (Wales) Jonny Clayton (second round)

== Draw ==
First round (best of 11 legs); 26–27 October
1	(Netherlands) Michael van Gerwen 95.95	6
(Netherlands) Jan Dekker 88.74	2
(England) Ian White 96.83	6
(England) Darren Webster 90.88	5
8	(Australia) Simon Whitlock 88.63	6
(England) James Richardson 85.11	3
(England) Mervyn King 91.55	4
(England) Alan Norris 92.34	6
5	(Netherlands) Jelle Klaasen 92.02	6
(Netherlands) Christian Kist 64.35	0
(Scotland) John Henderson 94.41	1
(Australia) Kyle Anderson 96.64	6
4	(Austria) Mensur Suljović 92.86	6
(Belgium) Kim Huybrechts 91.02	5
(Wales) Gerwyn Price 96.76	6
(Belgium) Ronny Huybrechts 93.71	5
2	(Scotland) Peter Wright 98.06	6
(Poland) Krzysztof Ratajski 92.14	3
(Wales) Jonny Clayton 102.80	6
(Belgium) Dimitri Van den Bergh 86.76	1
7	(England) Joe Cullen 89.32	5
(England) Stephen Bunting 93.65	6
(Northern Ireland) Daryl Gurney 98.60	6
(England) Steve Beaton 90.83	3
6	(England) Rob Cross 101.33	6
(Germany) Martin Schindler 90.28	0
(England) Dave Chisnall 99.51	6
(Spain) Cristo Reyes 89.77	1
3	(England) Michael Smith 89.14	6
(England) Nathan Aspinall 93.30	4
(Netherlands) Benito van de Pas 94.21	6
(Netherlands) Vincent van der Voort 90.96	5

Second round (best of 19 legs); 27–28 October
1	(Netherlands) Michael van Gerwen 105.41	10
(England) Ian White 99.25	1
8	(Australia) Simon Whitlock 95.73	10
(England) Alan Norris 85.67	0
5	(Netherlands) Jelle Klaasen 90.66	6
(Australia) Kyle Anderson 91.84	10
4	(Austria) Mensur Suljović 96.81	10
(Wales) Gerwyn Price 93.57	4
2	(Scotland) Peter Wright 98.94	10
(Wales) Jonny Clayton 89.01	8
(England) Stephen Bunting 93.82	6
(Northern Ireland) Daryl Gurney 94.12	10
6	(England) Rob Cross 94.56	10
(England) Dave Chisnall 88.29	7
3	(England) Michael Smith 93.06	10
(Netherlands) Benito van de Pas 89.57	9

Quarter-finals (best of 19 legs); 29 October
1	(Netherlands) Michael van Gerwen 100.80	10
8	(Australia) Simon Whitlock 90.51	5
(Australia) Kyle Anderson 97.57	10
4	(Austria) Mensur Suljović 96.31	7
2	(Scotland) Peter Wright 101.83	5
(Northern Ireland) Daryl Gurney 95.56	10
6	(England) Rob Cross 100.85	10
3	(England) Michael Smith 92.22	4

Semi-finals (best of 21 legs); 29 October
1	(Netherlands) Michael van Gerwen 95.39	11
(Australia) Kyle Anderson 95.56	10
(Northern Ireland) Daryl Gurney 92.63	3
6	(England) Rob Cross 98.02	11

Final (best of 21 legs); 29 October
1	(Netherlands) Michael van Gerwen 108.91	11
6	(England) Rob Cross 102.39	7
