= Corey Cadby =

Australian darts player (born 1995)

Personal information
- Full name: Corey George Cadby
- Nickname: "King"
- Born: 18 March 1995 (age 31) Devonport, Tasmania, Australia
- Home town: Melbourne, Victoria, Australia

Sport
- Sport: Darts
- Playing since: 2011
- Darts: 24g Target
- Laterality: Right-handed
- Walk-on music: "Thunder" by Imagine Dragons

Organisation (see split in darts)
- PDC: 2016–2020, 2023–2024

PDC premier events – best performances
- World Championship: Last 64: 2017
- UK Open: Runner-up: 2018
- Grand Slam: Group Stage: 2017

Other tournament wins
- Years
Australian Grand Masters	2016
Australian Masters	2017
Chester Hill Open	2016
DPA Pro Tour	2017 (x3), 2018 (x7)
DWA Grand Prix	2016
Queensland Open	2016 (x2)
UK Open Qualifier	2018
Victoria Open	2016 (x3)
Warilla Bowls Club Open	2016
Youth events
PDC World Youth Championship	2016
PDC Development Tour (x2)	2016, 2019

Corey George Cadby (born 18 March 1995) is an Australian professional darts player who formerly competed in Professional Darts Corporation (PDC) events. He was the 2016 World Youth champion.

== Career ==
A native of Tasmania, Cadby began competing in Darts Players Australia (DPA) events in 2016 after relocating to Melbourne. He won seven events during his debut season on the DPA Australian Grand Prix circuit, and finished first in the rankings, thus securing qualification for the 2017 PDC World Championship.

In August 2016, Cadby lost 6–3 to 16-time world champion Phil Taylor in the first round of the Sydney Masters on his televised debut. He played Taylor again a week later in the first round of the Perth Masters, winning 6–2 with an average of 103.58. He went on to lose to Peter Wright 10–2 in the quarter-finals, with both players averaging 109. In October, Cadby qualified for the final of the PDC World Youth Championship, defeating Dimitri Van den Bergh in the semi-finals. The final was played in Minehead, England in November, as part of the last night of the Players Championship Finals and Cadby beat Berry van Peer 6–2 to secure the title.

Cadby won 2–0 in the preliminary round of the 2017 World Championship against China's Sun Qiang with an average of 102.48, a record for the prelims, to set up a first round tie with 28th seed Joe Cullen. In a high quality contest, Cadby took the opening set, but went on to lose 1–3. He took out six ton-plus finishes in the two matches he played.

In 2018, Corey competed at PDC Q School. On the first day of play, Cadby defeated Callan Rydz 5–2 in the final four to secure his PDC Tour Card. On 10 February 2018, Cadby won his first PDC title since winning his tour card the previous month in the 5th UK Open qualifier, defeating reigning World Champion Rob Cross in the final with an average of 108.77.

In 2019, Cadby made his PDC European Tour debut at the 2019 Czech Darts Open, defeating Wessel Nijman, Michael Smith and losing to Mervyn King.

After problems getting to the UK to play the ProTour, Cadby resigned his Tour Card at the start of 2020 despite being in the top 64.

=== 2023 ===
In 2023, Cadby returned to darts at Q–School to win back his tour card, which he managed to do with a 101 average in a win over Karel Sedláček in the Day 2 Final. However, Cadby did not participate in any PDC darts events throughout 2023 and as a result of this the PDC removed his tour card in January 2024.

== World Championship record ==
=== PDC ===
- 2017: First round (lost to Joe Cullen 1–3)

== Performance timeline ==
Tournament	2016	2017	2018	2019	2020	2021–2022	2023
PDC World Championship	DNQ	1R	DNQ	WD	DNQ	(Note: Did not play due to personal reasons)	DNP
UK Open	DNQ		F	WD	(Note: resigned Tour Card despite being in the top 64 after 2020 PDC World Darts Championship, regained a card in 2023 but did not play any events)	(Note: Did not play due to personal reasons)	WD
Grand Slam of Darts	DNQ	RR	DNQ		(Note: resigned Tour Card despite being in the top 64 after 2020 PDC World Darts Championship, regained a card in 2023 but did not play any events)	(Note: Did not play due to personal reasons)	DNQ
Non-ranked televised events
World Series of Darts Finals	DNQ	2R	DNQ	DNP			
PDC World Youth Championship	W	SF	DNP				
Career statistics
Year-end ranking (PDC)	-	-	59	63	-	-	-

=== PDC European Tour ===
Tournament	2019
Czech Open	3R

=== PDC Players Championships ===
Season	1	2	3	4	5	6	7	8	9	10	11	12	13	14	15	16	17	18	19	20	21	22	23	24	25	26	27	28	29	30
2018	BAR; 2R	BAR; F	Did not participate																											
2019	Did not participate								BAR; 2R	BAR; 1R	BAR; 2R	BAR; 4R	BAR; 1R	BAR; 3R	BAR; 1R	BAR; 2R	WIG; 3R	WIG; 1R	Did not participate											

Performance Table Legend
W	Won the tournament	F	Finalist	SF	Semifinalist	QF	Quarterfinalist	#R; RR; L#	Lost in # round Round-robin; Last # stage	DQ	Disqualified
DNQ	Did not qualify	DNP	Did not participate	WD	Withdrew	NH	Tournament not held	#R; RR; L#	Lost in # round Round-robin; Last # stage	NYF	Not yet founded

== PDC career finals ==
=== PDC major finals: 1 ===
Legend
UK Open (0–1)

Outcome	No.	Year	Championship	Opponent in the final	Score (Note: (l) = score in legs, (s) = score in sets.)
Runner-up	1.	2018	UK Open	Gary Anderson	7–11 (l)

=== PDC world series finals: 1 ===
Outcome	No.	Year	Championship	Opponent in the final	Score
Runner-up	1.	2017	Auckland Darts Masters	Kyle Anderson	10–11 (l)

== Legal issues ==
In 2025, Cadby was found guilty of committing aggravated burglary in December 2022. He was sentenced to two years and three months in prison.
