= Kyle Anderson (darts player) =

Australian darts player (1987–2021)

- Anderson after his 2017 Auckland Darts Masters win

Personal information
- Full name: Noel James Kyle Anderson
- Nickname: "The Original"
- Born: 14 September 1987 Subiaco, Western Australia, Australia
- Died: 24 August 2021 (aged 33) Perth, Australia
- Home town: Perth, Australia

Sport
- Sport: Darts
- Playing since: 1993
- Darts: 23g Shot Signature
- Laterality: Right-handed
- Walk-on music: "Solid Rock" by Street Warriors featuring Shannon Noll

Organisation (see split in darts)
- BDO: 2006–2012
- PDC: 2012–2021

WDF major events – best performances
- World Masters: Last 72: 2010

PDC premier events – best performances
- World Championship: Last 32: 2015, 2016, 2018, 2019
- World Matchplay: Last 16: 2016
- World Grand Prix: Last 16: 2016
- UK Open: Quarter-final: 2016
- European Championship: Semi-final: 2017
- PC Finals: Last 64: 2017, 2018, 2019
- World Series Finals: Last 16: 2017, 2018

Other tournament wins
- Years
Canberra DPA Event	2012
Coolbellup Open	2010
DPA Australian Matchplay	2013
DPA Pro Tour	2020
DPA WA Open	2011
Japan Open	2010
Mittagong RSL Open	2013 (x2)
Nerang Open	2013
Oceanic Masters	2012
Sydney Masters Qualifier	2014
Victoria Open	2013 (x2)
Warilla Bowls Club Open	2013
Players Championships (×1)
2017 Players Championship 17
World Series of Darts (×1)
Auckland Darts Masters	2017

Other achievements
- 2013 Hits his first televised Nine-dart finish at the World Championships against Ian White 2015 Breaks into the top 64 on the PDC Order of Merit for the first time 2015 Hits a world record average of 134.84 in the fifth Players Championship 2016 Breaks into the top 32 on the PDC Order of Merit for the first time 2017 Wins the 2017 Auckland Darts Masters to claim his first ever televised championship. 2017 Nine-dart finish at the European Championship against Michael van Gerwen
Medal record
Men's Darts
Representing Australia
WDF Asia-Pacific Cup
Gold medal – first place	2008 Palmerston	Team event
Gold medal – first place	2010 Tokyo	Team event
Bronze medal – third place	2010 Tokyo	Men's pairs

Noel James Kyle Anderson (14 September 1987 – 24 August 2021) was an Australian professional darts player who played within the Professional Darts Corporation (PDC) from 2012 to 2021. He won the 2017 Auckland Darts Masters tournament.

== Career ==
He started playing darts at the age of six and had competed in tournaments since he was nine. He first became interested in the game watching his father play. Anderson qualified for the 2013 PDC World Darts Championship by winning the Oceanic Masters. He lost to Steve Beaton 3–0 in the first round after he missed two opportunities to take each of the opening two sets. Anderson dominated in the DPA's 2013 Australian Grand Prix season by winning seven events to top the Order of Merit. This secured him a place in the Sydney Darts Masters and the 2014 World Championship. He was drawn to play against 16–time world champion Phil Taylor in Sydney, but was defeated 6–1. At 2–1 down to Ian White in the first round of the World Championship, Anderson became the seventh player to throw a nine-dart finish in the history of the event. It was the second nine darter in less than an hour, after Terry Jenkins had also hit one, meaning the £30,000 prize money was shared. However, it was the last leg that he won during the match, as he was defeated 3–1. Anderson stated after the match that he hoped his performance would help raise the profile of darts in Australia.

Anderson entered the 2014 Q School in an attempt to earn a two-year PDC tour card and succeeded on the first day by winning seven matches, culminating in a 5–3 win over Keegan Brown. He stated that if he could get sponsorship he would move to the UK to play the full schedule of events, which he did a few months later by moving to Nottingham. Anderson qualified for his first UK Open but lost 5–4 against Kevin McDine in the opening round. He reached the semi-finals of a PDC event for the first time in April at the sixth Players Championship by beating seven-time major winner James Wade 6–3 in the quarters. Anderson faced Ian White and lost 6–1, with his solitary leg coming via a 140 checkout. In the opening round of the Perth Darts Masters he was whitewashed 6–0 by Michael van Gerwen. A week later, Anderson came from 3–0 down against Raymond van Barneveld at the Sydney Darts Masters to win 6–5 and set up an all Australian quarter-final with Simon Whitlock. Anderson stormed into a 3–0 lead, and went on to record the most significant win of his career 8–3. His run came to an end when he lost 10–4 to Phil Taylor in the semi-finals. A further quarter-final appearance at the 16th Players Championship followed, but Anderson lost 6–1 against Stephen Bunting.

=== 2015 ===
Anderson defeated Steve Beaton 3–0 in the first round of the 2015 World Championship, a complete reversal of their meeting at the same stage of the event two years prior. Anderson lost three consecutive sets from 2–1 ahead in the next round against Andy Hamilton to exit the tournament with a 4–2 defeat. He entered the top 64 on the Order of Merit for the first time after the event as he was ranked world number 55. Anderson had a good UK Open as he saw off Terry Temple, as well as recent defectors from the BDO Alan Norris and James Wilson to play Mervyn King in the fifth round. Anderson led 8–7, but his scoring power deserted him as he was unable to set up a match winning double in the next two legs to be edged out 9–8. One semi-final and two quarter-final showings on the Pro Tour has seen Anderson qualify for the World Matchplay through the Pro Tour Order of Merit. In his debut in the event he was 8–7 behind James Wade with all 15 legs going on throw. Anderson missed four darts for the next leg and would lose 10–7. He received an invite to the World Series of Darts Finals and exited in the first round 6–4 against Dave Chisnall.

=== 2016 ===
A 3–0 win over Brendan Dolan saw Anderson whitewash a seeded player in the first round of the World Championship for the second year in a row. He was 2–0 ahead of Vincent van der Voort in the second round, but went on to be eliminated 4–2. Anderson reached his first major PDC quarter-final at the UK Open by defeating Andy Hamilton, James Wilson and Benito van de Pas. In the quarter-final he was thrashed 10–0 by Jelle Klaasen. At the second Players Championship event he came close to playing in his first Pro Tour final, but was edged out in the semi-finals 6–5 by Michael van Gerwen after missing one match dart. Anderson and Simon Whitlock knocked out Germany and Denmark at the World Cup to meet the Netherlands in the quarter-finals. After Whitlock lost to Van Gerwen it meant Anderson needed to beat Raymond van Barneveld to keep Australia in the event and he did so 4–3. In the deciding doubles match, the Dutch pair threw an 11 dart leg to win 4–3.

In the quarter-finals of the Austrian Darts Open, Anderson knocked out Van Gerwen 6–4 and then went 4–1 up on Phil Taylor and for the second time that year missed one match dart to reach the final as Taylor won 6–5. After seeing off Vincent van der Voort 10–4, Anderson and Van Gerwen met again, this time in the second round of the World Matchplay, with the world number one winning 11–3. He also reached the second round of the World Grand Prix by beating Cristo Reyes 2–1 in sets, but lost 3–1 to Gary Anderson. In the European Championship, Anderson defeated Dave Chisnall and James Richardson before losing 10–5 to Peter Wright in the quarter-finals. Anderson was then forced to withdraw from the Players Championship Finals and the 2017 World Championship due to being unable to obtain a UK Visa.

=== 2017: Auckland Masters triumph ===
Anderson returned to the UK in time for the start of the 2017 season. He won his first Players Championship title at the 17 event of the 2017 PDC Pro Tour, beating Kevin Painter in the final. He then went on to win the 2017 Auckland Darts Masters, his first televised title, beating Corey Cadby to win the event.

Anderson made the semi-final of the 2017 European Championship, and hit a nine-dart finish against Michael van Gerwen before losing in a last-leg decider.

=== 2018–2021 ===
Anderson continued playing on the tour through 2018 and 2019, but was unable to win another event. After beginning the 2020 season, he returned to Australia in March following the suspension of events due to the COVID-19 pandemic and did not return to the tour, choosing to resign his card prior to the start of the 2021 tour so that he could stay with his family for the birth of his second child.

== Personal life and death ==
Anderson was an Aboriginal man of Noongar origin and was extremely proud of this. This was reflected in his nickname ‘The Original’ (Short for Aboriginal).

Kyle’s older brother Beau was also a professional darts player, however, Beau left the PDC Tour in 2017.

Anderson moved from Australia to Nottingham, England, when he became a professional darts player. During the COVID-19 pandemic, he returned to Australia. Anderson was a diabetic, and also had COVID-19 in 2020.

His death was announced on 24 August 2021; he was 33 years old. The cause of death was kidney failure, for which he had been in hospital receiving treatment.

Following their victory at the 2022 PDC World Cup of Darts, Australia’s players Simon Whitlock and Damon Heta dedicated their success to Anderson, who had represented his country in the tournament four times.

== World Championship results ==
=== PDC ===
- 2013: First round (lost to Steve Beaton 0–3)
- 2014: First round (lost to Ian White 1–3)
- 2015: Second round (lost to Andy Hamilton 2–4)
- 2016: Second round (lost to Vincent van der Voort 2–4)
- 2018: Second round (lost to Raymond van Barneveld 1–4)
- 2019: Third round (lost to Nathan Aspinall 1–4)
- 2020: Second round (lost to Steve Beaton 1–3)

== Career finals ==
=== PDC World Series finals: 1 (1 title) ===
Outcome	No.	Year	Championship	Opponent in the final	Score
Winner	1.	2017	Auckland Darts Masters	(Australia) Corey Cadby	11–10 (l)

== Performance timeline ==
Kyle Anderson's performance timeline is as follows:

Tournament	2013	2014	2015	2016	2017	2018	2019	2020
PDC Ranked televised events
World Championship	1R	1R	2R	2R	DNP	2R	3R	2R
UK Open	DNQ	1R	5R	QF	3R	4R	4R	3R
World Matchplay	DNQ		1R	2R	1R	1R	DNQ	
World Grand Prix	Did not qualify			2R	1R	DNQ		
European Championship	Did not qualify			QF	SF	1R	DNQ	
Players Championship Finals	Did not qualify			DNP	1R	1R	1R	DNQ
PDC Non-ranked televised events
World Cup	DNQ			QF	2R	SF	2R	DNP
World Series Finals	Not held		1R	DNQ	2R	2R	1R	DNP
Year-end ranking	-	84	40	30	23	23	41	60

=== PDC Players Championships ===
Season	1	2	3	4	5	6	7	8	9	10	11	12	13	14	15	16	17	18	19	20	21	22	23	24	25	26	27	28	29	30
2014	BAR; 1R	BAR; 2R	CRA; 2R	CRA; 1R	WIG; 3R	WIG; SF	WIG; 2R	WIG; 1R	CRA; 2R	CRA; 1R	COV; 3R	COV; 4R	CRA; 1R	CRA; 2R	DUB; 2R	DUB; QF	CRA; 2R	CRA; 1R	COV; 3R	COV; 4R										
2015	BAR; 3R	BAR; 2R	BAR; SF	BAR; 1R	BAR; 2R	COV; 2R	COV; 1R	COV; 3R	CRA; DNP		BAR; 4R	BAR; 3R	WIG; QF	WIG; 3R	DNP				COV; 1R	COV; 2R										
2016	BAR; 3R	BAR; SF	BAR; 3R	BAR; 4R	BAR; 3R	BAR; 3R	BAR; 3R	COV; 4R	COV; 1R	BAR; QF	BAR; 3R	BAR; 3R	BAR; 2R	BAR; DNP			DUB; 3R	DUB; 4R	BAR; DNP											
2017	BAR; QF	BAR; 2R	BAR; 3R	BAR; 3R	MIL; 3R	MIL; 2R	BAR; 4R	BAR; 2R	WIG; 3R	WIG; 3R	MIL; 4R	MIL; 1R	WIG; 2R	WIG; 3R	BAR; SF	BAR; 1R	BAR; W	BAR; 2R	DUB; 4R	DUB; 3R	BAR; 1R	BAR; 2R								
2018	BAR; 3R	BAR; 2R	BAR; 1R	BAR; 2R	MIL; 2R	MIL; 3R	BAR; 4R	BAR; 2R	WIG; 2R	WIG; 2R	MIL; DNP		WIG; 4R	WIG; 2R	BAR; 1R	BAR; 1R	BAR; 3R	BAR; 2R	DUB; 3R	DUB; 3R	BAR; 2R	BAR; SF								
2019	WIG; QF	WIG; 2R	WIG; 2R	WIG; QF	BAR; 2R	BAR; QF	WIG; 1R	WIG; 1R	BAR; 2R	BAR; 2R	BAR; 1R	BAR; 2R	BAR; 1R	BAR; 3R	BAR; 3R	BAR; 1R	WIG; 3R	WIG; 1R	BAR; 3R	BAR; 2R	HIL; 2R	HIL; 3R	BAR; 3R	BAR; 4R	DNP				BAR; 1R	BAR; 1R
2020	DNP				WIG; 1R	WIG; 1R	BAR; 2R	BAR; 1R	Did not participate																					

Key

Performance Table Legend
W	Won the tournament	F	Finalist	SF	Semifinalist	QF	Quarterfinalist	#R; RR; Prel.	Lost in # round Round-robin; Preliminary round	DQ	Disqualified
DNQ	Did not qualify	DNP	Did not participate	WD	Withdrew	NH	Tournament not held	#R; RR; Prel.	Lost in # round Round-robin; Preliminary round	NYF	Not yet founded

== Nine-dart finishes ==
Kyle Anderson televised nine-dart finishes
Date	Opponent	Tournament	Method	Prize
14 December 2013	(England) Ian White	PDC World Championship	3 x T20; 3 x T20; T20, T19, D12	£15,000
29 October 2017	(Netherlands) Michael van Gerwen	European Championship	3 x T20; 3 x T20; T20, T19, D12	£25,000
