= 2015 World Series of Darts =

The 2015 World Series of Darts was a series of non-televised darts tournaments organised by the Professional Darts Corporation. There were 5 World Series events and one Final event being held – one in the United Arab Emirates, one in New Zealand, one in Japan, two in Australia, with the Finals being held in Glasgow, Scotland.

== Prize money ==
Stage (num. of players)		Prize money
Winner	(1)	£65,000
Runner-up	(1)	£40,000
Semi-finalists	(2)	£30,000
Quarter-finalists	(4)	£20,000
First round losers	(8)	£10,000
Total	£165,000	

== World Series events ==
No.	Date	Event	Venue	Winner	Legs	Runner-up	Ref.
1	28–29 May	Dubai Masters	(United Arab Emirates) Dubai, Dubai Tennis Centre	Michael van Gerwen (Netherlands)	11–8	(England) Phil Taylor	
2	27–28 June	Japan Masters	(Japan) Yokohama, Osanbashi Hall	Phil Taylor (England)	8–7	(Scotland) Peter Wright	
3	14–16 August	Perth Masters	(Australia) Perth, HBF Stadium	Phil Taylor (England)	11–7	(England) James Wade	
4	20–22 August	Sydney Masters	(Australia) Sydney, Qantas Credit Union Arena	Phil Taylor (England)	11–3	(England) Adrian Lewis	
5	28–30 August	Auckland Masters	(New Zealand) Auckland, The Trusts Arena	Adrian Lewis (England)	11–10	(Netherlands) Raymond van Barneveld	
6	21–22 November	World Series of Darts Finals	(Scotland) Glasgow, Braehead Arena	Michael van Gerwen (Netherlands)	11–10	(Scotland) Peter Wright	

== World Series qualifiers ==
PDC Seeds
- (England) Phil Taylor
- (Netherlands) Michael van Gerwen
- (Scotland) Gary Anderson
- (Scotland) Peter Wright
- (England) James Wade
- (England) Adrian Lewis
- (Netherlands) Raymond van Barneveld
- (England) Stephen Bunting

Japan Masters
- (Japan) Morihiro Hashimoto
- (Japan) Haruki Muramatsu
- (Japan) Yuki Yamada
- (Japan) Sho Katsumi
- (Japan) Masumi Chino
- (Japan) Katsuya Aiba
- (Japan) Shintaro Inoue
- (Japan) Chikara Fujimori

Perth Masters
- (Australia) Simon Whitlock
- (Australia) Kyle Anderson
- (Australia) Laurence Ryder
- (Australia) Paul Nicholson
- (Australia) Kim Lewis
- (Australia) David Platt
- (New Zealand) Craig Caldwell
- (Australia) Adam Rowe

Sydney Masters
- (Australia) Simon Whitlock
- (Australia) Paul Nicholson
- (Australia) David Platt
- (Australia) Laurence Ryder
- (New Zealand) Craig Caldwell
- (New Zealand) Cody Harris
- (Australia) Tic Bridge
- (New Zealand) Warren Parry

Auckland Masters
- (Australia) Simon Whitlock
- (Australia) Paul Nicholson
- (Australia) David Platt
- (New Zealand) Rob Szabo
- (Australia) Laurence Ryder
- (New Zealand) Mark Cleaver
- (Australia) Rob Modra
- (New Zealand) Craig Caldwell

== Quarter-finalists ==
Player	Dubai	Japan	Perth	Sydney	Auckland	Finals
(England) Phil Taylor	Runner up	Winner	Winner	Winner	Semi-finalist	Semi-finalist
(England) Adrian Lewis	Semi-finalist	Quarter-finalist	Quarter-finalist	Runner up	Winner	Semi-finalist
(Netherlands) Michael van Gerwen	Winner	Semi-finalist	Semi-finalist	Quarter-finalist	Quarter-finalist	Winner
(Scotland) Peter Wright	Quarter-finalist	Runner up	Quarter-finalist	Semi-finalist	Quarter-finalist	Runner up
(England) James Wade	Quarter-finalist	Quarter-finalist	Runner up	Quarter-finalist	Semi-finalist	Quarter-finalist
(Netherlands) Raymond van Barneveld	Quarter-finalist	Quarter-finalist	Quarter-finalist	Semi-finalist	Runner up	Quarter-finalist
(Scotland) Gary Anderson	Semi-finalist	Semi-finalist	Semi-finalist	Quarter-finalist	Quarter-finalist	Second round (16)
(England) Stephen Bunting	Quarter-finalist	Quarter-finalist	First round	Quarter-finalist	First round	Quarter-finalist
(Australia) Kyle Anderson	Did not qualify	Did not qualify	Quarter-finalist	Did not qualify	Did not qualify	First round (24)
(Australia) Simon Whitlock	Did not qualify	Did not qualify	First round	First round	Quarter-finalist	First round (24)
(England) Terry Jenkins	Did not qualify	Did not qualify	Did not qualify	Did not qualify	Did not qualify	Quarter-finalist
