= 2015 World Series of Darts Finals =

2015 Unibet World Series of Darts Finals

Tournament information
- Dates: 21–22 November 2015
- Venue: Braehead Arena
- Location: Glasgow
- Country: Scotland
- Organisation(s): PDC
- Format: Legs
- Prize fund: £155,000
- Winner's share: £30,000
- High checkout: 170 (Netherlands) Michael van Gerwen

Champion(s)
- (Netherlands) Michael van Gerwen

The 2015 Unibet World Series of Darts Finals was the inaugural event of the World Series of Darts Finals. The tournament took place in the Braehead Arena, Glasgow, Scotland, between 21–22 November 2015. It featured a field of 24 players formed up of a mix of players who had competed in the 2015 World Series of Darts, along with some invited players.

Michael van Gerwen won the title by beating Peter Wright 11–10 in the final.

== Prize money ==
Position (no. of players)		Prize money (Total: £155,000)
Winner	(1)	£30,000
Runner-up	(1)	£15,000
Semi-finalists	(2)	£10,000
Quarter-finalists	(4)	£7,500
Last 16 (second round)	(8)	£5,000
Last 24 (first round)	(8)	£2,500

== Qualification and format ==
The top eight players from the five World Series events of 2015 were seeded for this tournament. They were:

- 2015 Dubai Duty Free Darts Masters
- 2015 Japan Darts Masters
- 2015 Perth Darts Masters
- 2015 Sydney Darts Masters
- 2015 Auckland Darts Masters

Eight players were invited (as "international prospects"), as were the next four highest ranked players from the PDC Order of Merit on 15 September 2015. Another four places were awarded in a qualifying event that took place in Coventry on October 23, 2015.

The following players qualified for the tournament:

1–8
1. (England) Phil Taylor (semi-finals)
2. (England) Adrian Lewis (semi-finals)
3. (Netherlands) Michael van Gerwen (winner)
4. (Scotland) Peter Wright (runner-up)
5. (England) James Wade (quarter-finals)
6. (Netherlands) Raymond van Barneveld (quarter-finals)
7. (Scotland) Gary Anderson (second round)
8. (England) Stephen Bunting (quarter-finals)

PDC Order of Merit Qualifiers
- (Scotland) Robert Thornton (second round)
- (England) Ian White (first round)
- (England) Dave Chisnall (second round)
- (Australia) Simon Whitlock (first round)

PDC Tour Card Qualifiers
- (England) Terry Jenkins (quarter-finals)
- (Wales) Mark Webster (second round)
- (Belgium) Dimitri Van den Bergh (first round)
- (England) Chris Dobey (first round)

Invited Players
- (England) Michael Smith (first round)
- (England) Keegan Brown (second round)
- (South Africa) Devon Petersen (first round)
- (Australia) Kyle Anderson (first round)
- (Wales) Jamie Lewis (second round)
- (Austria) Rowby-John Rodriguez (second round)
- (Netherlands) Benito van de Pas (first round)
- (Germany) Max Hopp (second round)

== Draw ==
First round (best of 11 legs); 21 November
RQ	(England) Dave Chisnall 94.60	6
WC	(Australia) Kyle Anderson 90.44	4
RQ	(Australia) Simon Whitlock 95.86	4
WC	(Austria) Rowby-John Rodriguez 90.15	6
WC	(Netherlands) Benito van de Pas 91.00	4
WC	(Wales) Jamie Lewis 86.63	6
WC	(Germany) Max Hopp 85.88	6
Q	(Belgium) Dimitri Van den Bergh 83.15	3
RQ	(England) Ian White 92.98	4
WC	(England) Keegan Brown 89.60	6
Q	(England) Terry Jenkins 97.05	6
Q	(England) Chris Dobey 92.54	5
WC	(England) Michael Smith 90.69	4
Q	(Wales) Mark Webster 100.16	6
RQ	(Scotland) Robert Thornton 89.45	6
WC	(South Africa) Devon Petersen 82.85	3

Second round (best of 11 legs); 21 November
1	(England) Phil Taylor 96.03	6
RQ	(England) Dave Chisnall 91.91	1
8	(England) Stephen Bunting 89.94	6
WC	(Austria) Rowby-John Rodriguez 85.77	4
5	(England) James Wade 103.66	6
WC	(Wales) Jamie Lewis 80.46	0
4	(Scotland) Peter Wright 98.07	6
WC	(Germany) Max Hopp 91.89	3
2	(England) Adrian Lewis 90.83	6
WC	(England) Keegan Brown 82.93	2
7	(Scotland) Gary Anderson 96.63	5
Q	(England) Terry Jenkins 91.90	6
6	(Netherlands) Raymond van Barneveld 96.69	6
Q	(Wales) Mark Webster 92.77	2
3	(Netherlands) Michael van Gerwen 101.61	6
RQ	(Scotland) Robert Thornton 93.46	1

Quarter-finals (best of 19 legs); 22 November
1	(England) Phil Taylor 104.18	10
8	(England) Stephen Bunting 94.53	3
5	(England) James Wade 97.31	6
4	(Scotland) Peter Wright 101.12	10
2	(England) Adrian Lewis 105.19	10
Q	(England) Terry Jenkins 100.68	6
6	(Netherlands) Raymond van Barneveld 103.49	8
3	(Netherlands) Michael van Gerwen 106.42	10

Semi-finals (best of 21 legs); 22 November
1	(England) Phil Taylor 104.10	9
4	(Scotland) Peter Wright 104.93	11
2	(England) Adrian Lewis 100.76	5
3	(Netherlands) Michael van Gerwen 108.00	11

Final (best of 21 legs); 22 November
4	(Scotland) Peter Wright 106.40	10
3	(Netherlands) Michael van Gerwen 106.60	11
