= Stephen Bunting =

English darts player (born 1985)

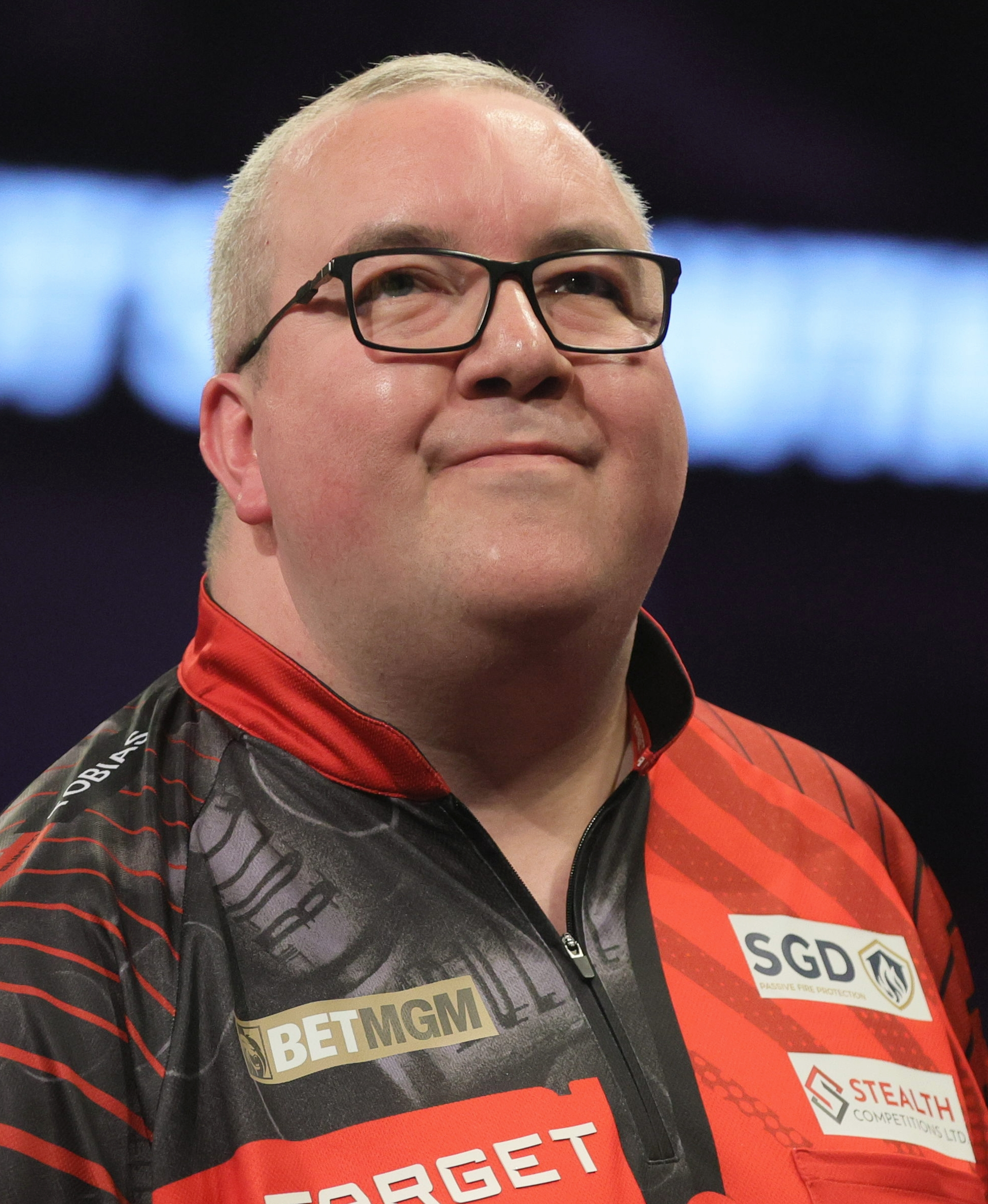
- Bunting in 2025

Personal information
- Nickname: "The Bullet"
- Born: 9 April 1985 (age 41) Liverpool, Merseyside, England
- Home town: St Helens, Merseyside, England

Sport
- Sport: Darts
- Playing since: 1997
- Darts: 18g Target
- Laterality: Right-handed
- Walk-on music: "Titanium" by David Guetta featuring Sia

Organisation (see split in darts)
- BDO: 2002–2014
- PDC: 2014–present (Tour Card: 2014–present)
- Current world ranking: (PDC) 10 ▼1 (22 November 2026)

WDF major events – best performances
- World Championship: Winner (1): 2014
- World Masters: Winner (2): 2012, 2013
- World Trophy: Last 32: 2003, 2004, 2005
- Finder Masters: Winner (1): 2012

PDC premier events – best performances
- World Championship: Semi-final: 2021, 2025
- World Matchplay: Quarter-final: 2019, 2025
- World Grand Prix: Semi-final: 2014, 2021
- UK Open: Semi-final: 2015
- Grand Slam: Semi-final: 2023
- European Championship: Quarter-final: 2014, 2026
- Premier League: 5th: 2026
- PC Finals: Quarter-final: 2018, 2019, 2023
- Masters: Winner (1): 2024
- World Series Finals: Quarter-final: 2015

Other tournament wins
- Years
WDF World Cup Pairs	2013
Players Championships (x4)
2016, 2021, 2025 (x2)
UK Open Qualifiers (x1)
UK Open Qualifier	2014
Youth Events
WDF World Youth Cup	2001
World Youth Masters	2001
WDF Europe Youth Cup	2002

Stephen Bunting (born 9 April 1985) is an English professional darts player who competes in Professional Darts Corporation (PDC) events, where he is ranked world number ten; he reached a peak ranking of world number four in 2025. Nicknamed "the Bullet", Bunting previously competed in British Darts Organisation (BDO) and World Darts Federation (WDF) events. He won the BDO World Championship in 2014. He also won three other BDO major titles: the World Masters in 2012 and 2013 and the Finder Masters in 2012.

He switched to the PDC after accepting a Tour Card in 2014, and has since won ten titles; seven ranking Pro Tour titles and three non-ranking. He won his first PDC major title at the 2024 Masters, defeating Michael van Gerwen in the final. He also reached the semi-finals of the PDC World Championship in 2021 and 2025.

== Early life ==
Bunting was born on 9 April 1985 in Liverpool, England, specifically the suburb of Fazakerley; he is a long-time resident of St Helens. He began playing darts at the Copplehouse pub and Holy Name Social Club in Fazakerley. He was educated at Archbishop Beck Catholic College in Liverpool.

== Darts career ==
=== Beginnings ===
Bunting won both the British Teenage Open and the World Youth Masters in 2001 and also captured the WDF Europe Youth Cup in 2002. He made his BDO World Darts Championship debut in 2004 aged 18, where he beat Vincent van der Voort in the first round before losing in the second round to former World Champion Ted Hankey. He returned to Lakeside in 2005 but was beaten in the first round by John Henderson.

In 2008 Bunting won the Lytham St Annes Open and was also recalled to the England squad. In July 2008 he reached the quarter-finals of the BDO British Classic where he lost to Scotland's Ross Montgomery live on Setanta. In November 2008 Bunting captured his maiden BDO ranked open title when he won the Northern Ireland Open, beating fellow Cheshire player Darryl Fitton two sets to nil in the Final.

Bunting was successful in qualifying for the 2009 BDO World Darts Championship as the standby qualifier, but was beaten by Gary Robson in the first round.

On 21 May 2009 Bunting finished joint fourth in the Dutch Pentathlon in Oosterhout, Netherlands. The pentathlon had a field of 20 BDO and PDC players and was won by Gary Anderson with Scott Waites 2nd and Gary Robson 3rd. It was played in Oosterhout Holland.

Bunting competed in the Winmau British Classic on 25 July 2009. He played Dave Chisnall in the semi-final and beat him 2–0 in sets. In the final Bunting played Scott Waites, where he came out the eventual winner 2 sets to 1 with a 170 finish in the fifth leg.

Bunting qualified for the 2010 BDO World Championship, beating the debuting Ian White 3–0 in the first round before losing to top seed Tony O'Shea 4–0 in the second round. The following year, Bunting once again qualified and won his first round match 3–0, this time against Brian Woods with the tournament's highest three-dart average of 94.62. Bunting then defeated Scott Waites in the second round 4–2 averaging 89.79 to reach his first World Championship quarter-final, where he was beaten 5–1 by third seed Dean Winstanley with both players averaging over the 90 mark.

September 2011 saw Bunting reach the quarterfinals of the Winmau World Masters on ESPN. Bunting had been playing all morning to fight through to the live televised stages and in the deciding match Bunting defeated Wayne Warren. Bunting was into the last 32 and played Peter Johns from Wales. Bunting won 3–0 in sets and played Robbie Green in the last 16. Bunting won 3–1 with per dart average of 30.33. In the quarter-finals Bunting lost 3 sets to nil against Ross Montgomery.

On 30 September 2011 Bunting played in the England Classic at Bunn Leisure, in Selsey Sussex. Bunting was the defending champion having won the title in 2010. Bunting started the day with a 3–0 win over Steve Gurney, followed up by a 3–0 win over Mark Davis. In the last 64 defeated Trevor Chant 3–0. In the last 32 Bunting beat Clive Barden 3–2. The last 16 saw Bunting defeat Sam Rooney 3–0. Bunting defeated Dean Jones 4–0 in the quarterfinal. In the semi-final Bunting defeated Tony Andrews 5–1 with a per dart average of 30.27. In the final Bunting defeated Jamie Robinson 6–3 with a per dart average of 29.10. Bunting won the £2,500 first prize for the second time.

On 22 October 2011 Bunting won his first European event at the Tops of Ghent tournament in Belgium. In the last 256 Bunting defeated Billy Caluwaerts (Belgium) 4–2. Bunting then defeated Marcel Blik (Netherlands) 4–1 in the last 128 round. In the last 64 Bunting played his Lancashire county teammate Gary Hooper and won 4–2. In the last 32 Bunting played another Lancashire county teammate and newly crowned Romanian Open Champion Joe Murnan. Bunting won 4–3. In the last 16 Bunting played Martin Atkins 'The Assassin' who is a regular in the BDO World Championships. Bunting had a 4–1 victory. In the quarterfinals Bunting played Christian Kist. Bunting won the tie 5–1 to gain a place in the semi-finals. In the semi-final Bunting played Darryl Fitton. Bunting ran out a 2 sets to 0 victor. In the final Bunting played Steve West. Bunting took the title 3–0 (2–3; 2–3; 1–3) in sets. Bunting won €1600 in prize money.

Bunting played in the PDC UK Open as an amateur entrant, and played two-time and defending champion James Wade in the second round. Bunting led the best-of-seven legs match 3–2 and had four match darts in the deciding leg – one at bullseye and three at double-19 – but was eventually defeated 4–3.

=== World Masters and World Champion ===
In October 2012, Bunting took his largest career title by winning the World Masters as the number one seed, defeating Tony O'Shea 7–4 in the final. In December, Bunting won the Zuiderduin Masters, by defeating Alan Norris in the final. Bunting finished 2012 at BDO and WDF World number one.

At the 2013 BDO World Championship, Bunting recorded the highest average of the first round in beating James Wilson 3–2, but in the second round he was unexpectedly defeated by Darryl Fitton 4–2 despite once again recording the highest average of the round. Bunting led 2–1 and had five darts at double top to take a 3–1 lead, but was unable to take the chance and Fitton went on to win six of the next eight legs to clinch victory. At the 2013 Isle of Man tournament final Bunting defeated Darryl Fitton 4–2 to win the title. He then won the Mariflex Open, the Welsh Open and the England Open. In July, Bunting won the England Masters title at the Pontins Southport beating Paul Jennings in the final 6–5. In the semi-final Bunting defeated Tony O'Shea 5–3.

Bunting successfully retained the World Masters title in 2013, becoming only the fourth man to do so after Eric Bristow, Bob Anderson, and Martin Adams. He also became the first man in history to win the title without dropping a single set. His tournament included a 6–0 semi-final win over world #4 Darryl Fitton, and a 7–0 final win over world #2 James Wilson. At the Zuiderduin Masters, Bunting reached the final for the second straight year but this time was comprehensively beaten by Wilson, 5–1 in sets.

Bunting entered the 2014 BDO World Championship as the number one seed for the second year in a row. He defeated Jim Widmayer 3–1 in the first round, Dave Prins 4–0 in the second round with the tournament's highest three-dart average (100.65), and Rick Hofstra 5–2 in the quarter-finals after Hofstra led 2-0 and had chances to win the fourth and sixth sets. In the semi-final, Bunting beat fourth seed Robbie Green 6–1 to set up a final with Alan Norris, which Bunting won 7–4 after the match had been level at 3–3.

=== Switch to the PDC ===
On 22 January 2014, it was announced that Bunting had received and accepted a tour card to join the Professional Darts Corporation. Bunting's first tournaments were the UK Open Qualifiers and he won the second and £10,000 by beating eight players, concluding with a 6–5 victory over Andrew Gilding. The result saw him enter the 2014 UK Open at the third round stage where he made his PDC televised debut against Kevin Dowling. Dowling threw for the match in the penultimate leg and missed match darts before Bunting stepped in to take out a 151 finish and sealed a 9–8 victory in the next leg to set up a meeting with Dean Winstanley. Bunting missed a dart at double 12 to start the match with a nine-dart finish, but went on to lose 9–6. He made his European Tour debut at the 2014 German Darts Masters and won through to the semi-finals where he lost to Phil Taylor 6–3. Bunting's second PDC final came at Players Championship 10, in a run which included a victory over world number one Michael van Gerwen, before being defeated by Terry Jenkins 6–3. He made his debut in the World Matchplay against Peter Wright and he beat the world number five 10–6. In the subsequent round he started badly against Gary Anderson to trail 5–0 and could never recover the deficit as he was defeated 13–8. In August he made his first World Series of Darts appearance as he was given a wildcard pick for the Sydney Darts Masters. Bunting beat John Weber, Wright and James Wade to reach the final where Taylor defeated him 11–3.

In October, Bunting reached the semi-finals of the World Grand Prix by beating Ronnie Baxter, Wright and Richie Burnett. He was defeated 4–0 by Michael van Gerwen, with the Dutchman winning three of the four sets in deciding legs. Bunting produced a superb performance in the second round of the European Championship as he averaged 102.21 in beating Taylor 10–9 having never been behind during the match and missed a double 12 for a nine-dart finish. He was unable to replicate the performance in the quarter-finals against Terry Jenkins as he was eliminated 10–7. Bunting reached the quarter-finals for the third major event in a row by beating Wade 10–8 at the Grand Slam of Darts, but lost 16–9 against Mervyn King. In the Players Championship Finals he was defeated 10–5 by Anderson in the second round.

=== 2015 ===
In his debut at the 2015 PDC World Darts Championship, Bunting saw off Robert Marijanović 3–1 in his first match, before defeating James Wade 4–1. He played Michael Smith in the third round and eliminated him 4–2, after surviving a comeback when Smith rallied from 3–0 down. Both players had a three-dart average of 102 and hit eight 180s each during the match. In an extremely close quarter-final clash with Raymond van Barneveld there was never more than a set between the players as they both averaged 98.30. Bunting could not win a leg in the deciding set to be defeated 5–4 and end his chances of becoming the first player to hold both versions of the World Championship at the same time. After Van Barneveld stated that his opponent's performance had shown he was a world class player, Bunting was left in tears on stage in the post-match interview.

Following the World Championship final, Bunting was named as a Sky Sports Wildcard to compete in the 2015 Premier League Darts. He drew 6–6 with Wade on the opening night. In the following weeks, Bunting would fall into the relegation zone, losing his next three games before winning his first game against Adrian Lewis 7–3 in the fifth week. He survived relegation by a point, but could only win one of his last seven matches to finish eighth in the league.

In March, Bunting would make it to the semi-finals of the UK Open, beating Adam Huckvale, Michael Smith, Dave Chisnall, William O'Connor and Mervyn King before being defeated by Peter Wright 10–0 with an average of just 82.39 over 20 points lower than Wright. He lost to Ian White 10–6 in the first round of the World Matchplay and took out just 19% of his finishes in the opening round of the World Grand Prix to be eliminated 2–1 in sets by Mark Webster. He lost in the first round of the Players Championship Finals and second round of the European Championship. Bunting did reach the quarter-finals of the inaugural World Series of Darts Finals, but was heavily beaten by Phil Taylor 10–3.

=== 2016 ===
Bunting met Raymond van Barneveld at the World Championship for the second successive year, this time in the second round. Once again there was never a set between the players, with Van Barneveld taking the final set by six legs to four. Bunting did not receive a wildcard for a second appearance at the Premier League this year. He reached the fifth round of the UK Open, but was beaten by Joe Cullen 9–7. En route to the final of the second Players Championship event, Bunting overturned a 5–0 deficit against Adrian Lewis to win 6–5. He then earned his second PDC title by overcoming Michael van Gerwen 6–4. Despite averaging 102.48, he was only ahead of Mensur Suljović in the first leg of their opening round World Matchplay match as he lost 10–8. A week later Bunting reached the semi-finals of the European Darts Open and was defeated 6–4 by Peter Wright. He was knocked out in the second round of both the World Grand Prix and European Championship, 3–0 in sets by Kim Huybrechts and 10–4 by Jelle Klaasen respectively.

=== 2017 ===
Bunting missed seven darts for the match in his first round tie with Darren Webster at the 2017 World Championship and bowed out 3–2 in sets.

=== 2018 ===
At the 2018 World Championship, he lost 3–1 in the first round to Dimitri Van den Bergh.

=== 2019 ===
At the 2019 World Championship, he lost 3–1 in the second round to Luke Humphries. Bunting returned to form in 2019, making two ranking finals and reaching the quarter-finals of both the 2019 World Matchplay and the 2019 Players Championship Finals.

=== 2020 ===
After three years without a win at the World Championship, he made it to the last 16 at the 2020 edition, beating José Justicia and Jonny Clayton, before being whitewashed 4–0 by world no. 1 Michael van Gerwen. As a result of his 2019 runs to the quarter-finals in the majors, he was selected for a return to the Premier League, appearing as a 'challenger' for the night in Liverpool.

In October, Bunting tested positive for COVID-19 and was forced to withdraw from the 2020 World Grand Prix.

=== 2021–2022 ===
After winning a sudden death leg against Andy Boulton his opening match of the 2021 World Championship, Bunting defeated James Wade, Ryan Searle and Krzysztof Ratajski en route to his first PDC World Championship semi-final. He was eliminated by the eventual champion Gerwyn Price, who beat him 6–4. He later reached the semi-finals of the 2021 World Grand Prix, where he was beaten by Price once again. On the 2021 PDC Pro Tour, Bunting won his first PDC title since 2016 by defeating Dimitri Van den Bergh 8–4 in the final of Players Championship 17.

At the 2022 World Championship, Bunting faced Ross Smith in the second round. He led the match 2–1 but went on to lose a tiebreaker in a 3–2 defeat. On the 2022 European Tour, he reached the semi-finals of the Austrian Darts Open and the European Darts Matchplay.

=== 2023 ===
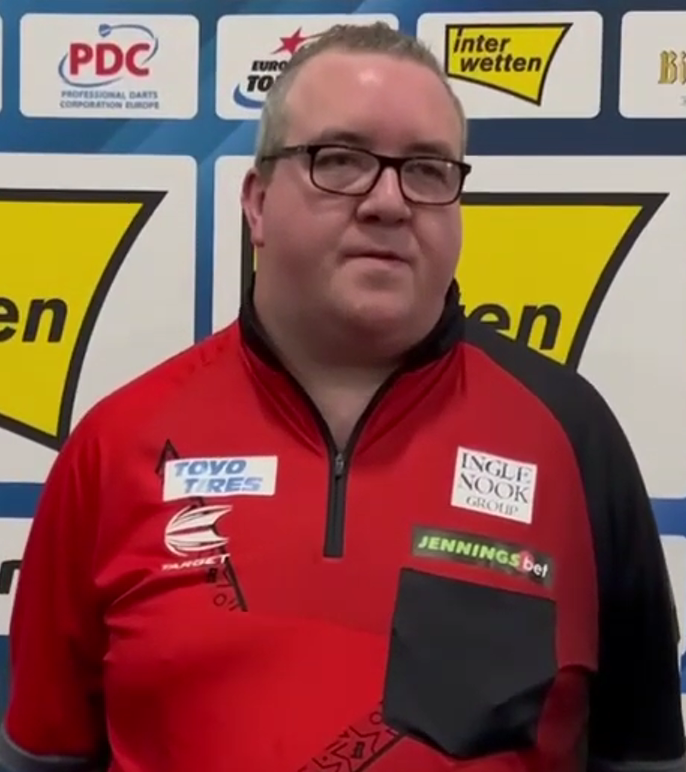
Bunting in 2023

Bunting won his opening match of the 2023 World Championship by recovering from 1–0 down to defeat Leonard Gates 3–1 in the second round. He ended an eight-match losing streak against Dave Chisnall by beating him 4–2 in the third round, before a 4–1 win against fifth seed Luke Humphries sent him through to the quarter-finals. He was eliminated in a 5–3 loss to eventual champion Michael Smith. Bunting appeared in his second European Tour final at the German Darts Open in September, where he was beaten 8–3 by Krzysztof Ratajski. At the Grand Slam, he reached his first major semi-final since October 2021, being defeated by Rob Cross by a score of 16–13. He also reached the quarter-finals of the Players Championship Finals, where he lost in a deciding leg to Michael van Gerwen.

=== 2024 ===
At the 2024 World Championship, Bunting reached the fourth round by beating Ryan Joyce and Florian Hempel by scorelines of 3–0 and 4–0 respectively, before suffering a 4–0 loss at the hands of Michael van Gerwen. At the Masters, he reached his first PDC major final, defeating reigning world champion Luke Humphries en route. He went on to win the final 11–7 against Van Gerwen, thereby winning his first PDC major title. He reached the quarter-finals of the UK Open, where he was defeated 10–2 by Humphries.

On the 2024 PDC Pro Tour, Bunting set the fourth highest three-dart average ever on the European Tour in his 6–0 victory over Owen Bates at the European Darts Open; Bunting averaged 117.12 in the match. He reached six Players Championship finals during the year and was unable to capture a title. In March, he lost to Raymond van Barneveld 8–1 in the final of Players Championship 5 (PC5). In September, he lost to Luke Littler 8–7 in the PC20 final. In October, Bunting was the runner-up at three consecutive events, losing to Wessel Nijman, Chris Dobey and Luke Humphries at PC24, PC25 and PC26 respectively. He reached his sixth Players Championship final of the year at PC29, but lost to Cameron Menzies 8–4. Bunting finished second on the 2024 Players Championship Order of Merit, meaning he would be the number two seed for the Players Championship Finals. He lost to 63rd seed Mario Vandenbogaerde 6–2 in the first round.

=== 2025 ===
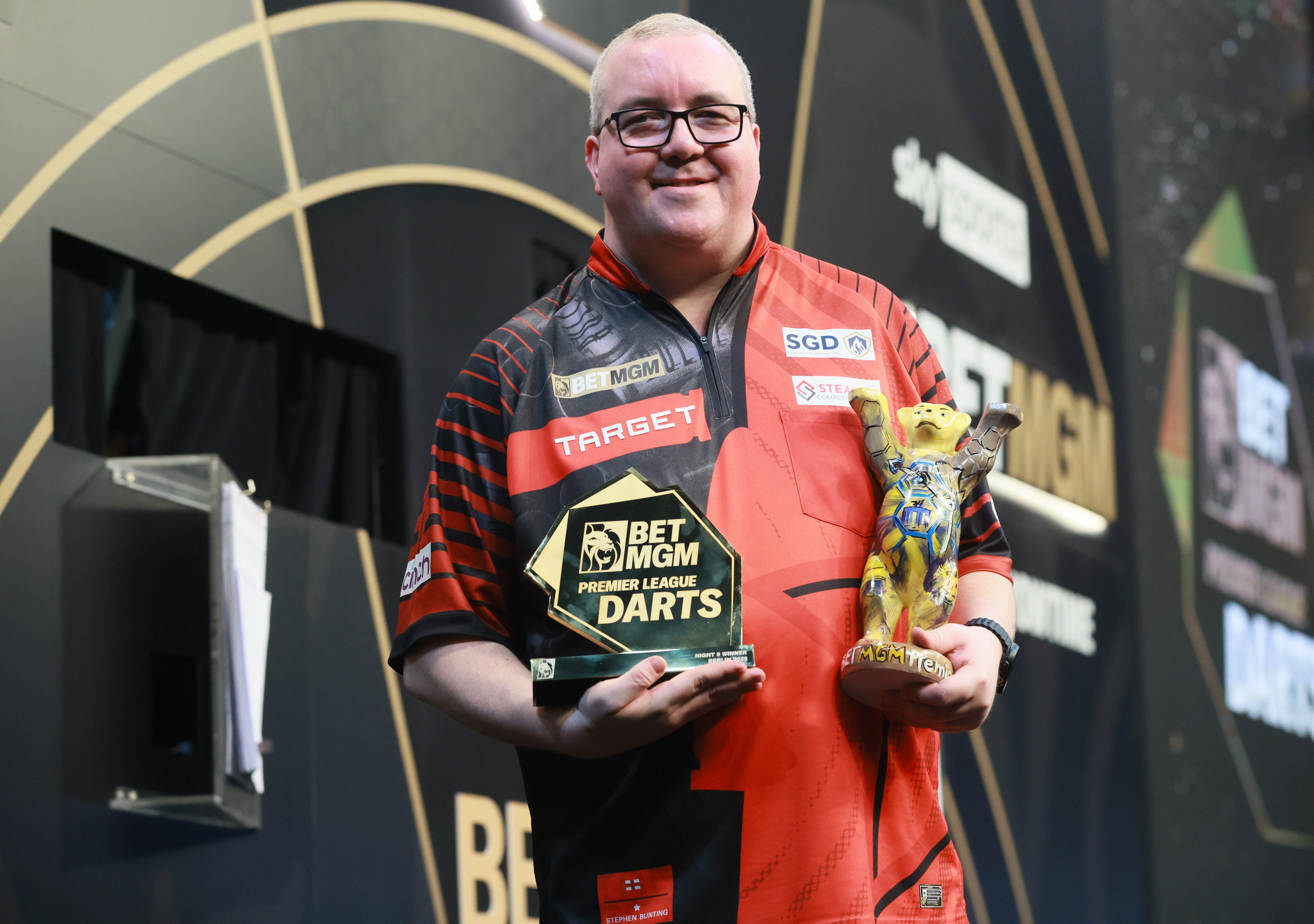
Bunting on night nine of 2025 Premier League Darts

At the 2025 World Championship, Bunting defeated Kai Gotthardt and Madars Razma before beating Luke Woodhouse 4–0 to reach the quarter-finals. He then defeated Peter Wright 5–2 to reach his first World Championship semi-final since the 2021 event. He was eliminated after a 6–1 loss to eventual champion Luke Littler. After the end of the tournament, Bunting was announced as part of the 2025 Premier League lineup. It was his first inclusion in the main lineup since the 2015 edition.

Competing on the World Series of Darts for the first time in 11 years, Bunting won his first World Series title at the 2025 Bahrain Darts Masters, beating Gerwyn Price 8–4 in the final. A week later, he was the runner-up at the Dutch Darts Masters after losing the final 8–5 to Rob Cross. He lost his first eight matches of the 2025 Premier League but turned his form around on night nine. On 3 April in Berlin, he achieved his first two wins before defeating Price 6–5 in the final to claim his first nightly win. The following weekend, Bunting won his first PDC European Tour title. He beat world number one Luke Humphries 7–6 in a last-leg decider in the semi-finals before defeating Nathan Aspinall 8–4 in the final. He reached a second Premier League nightly final on night 11 but suffered a 6–2 loss to Chris Dobey. At the end of the league stage, Bunting finished last in the table on 12 points.

Following the culmination of the Premier League, Bunting won his second World Series title at the Nordic Darts Masters by defeating Rob Cross 8–4 in a rematch of their final in the Netherlands. After losing six finals in Players Championship events in 2024, he claimed the Players Championship 18 (PC18) title by beating Jermaine Wattimena 8–5 in the final. He reached back-to-back finals at PC24 and PC25, winning the latter with an 8–6 victory over Jonny Clayton. He won his second European Tour title at the Swiss Darts Trophy by beating Luke Woodhouse 8–3 in the final. At the European Championship, Bunting averaged 109.20 in his first-round defeat to Chris Dobey, a record losing average in the competition.

=== 2026 ===
At the 2026 World Championship, Bunting was the fourth seed and reached the third round following wins over Sebastian Białecki and Nitin Kumar. He exited the tournament after a 4–3 upset loss to James Hurrell. He reached the final of Players Championship 3 in February, losing 8–1 to Chris Dobey. He achieved two nightly wins during the Premier League, triumphing on nights four and sixteen. He missed out on the play-offs, but his victory on night 16 resulted in him finishing fifth in the league table on 18 points.

== Personal life ==
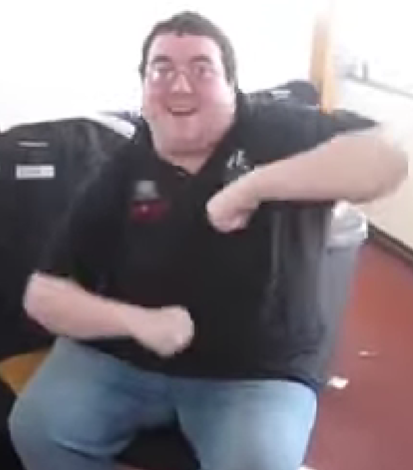
Bunting dancing to "Surfin' Bird" in 2014

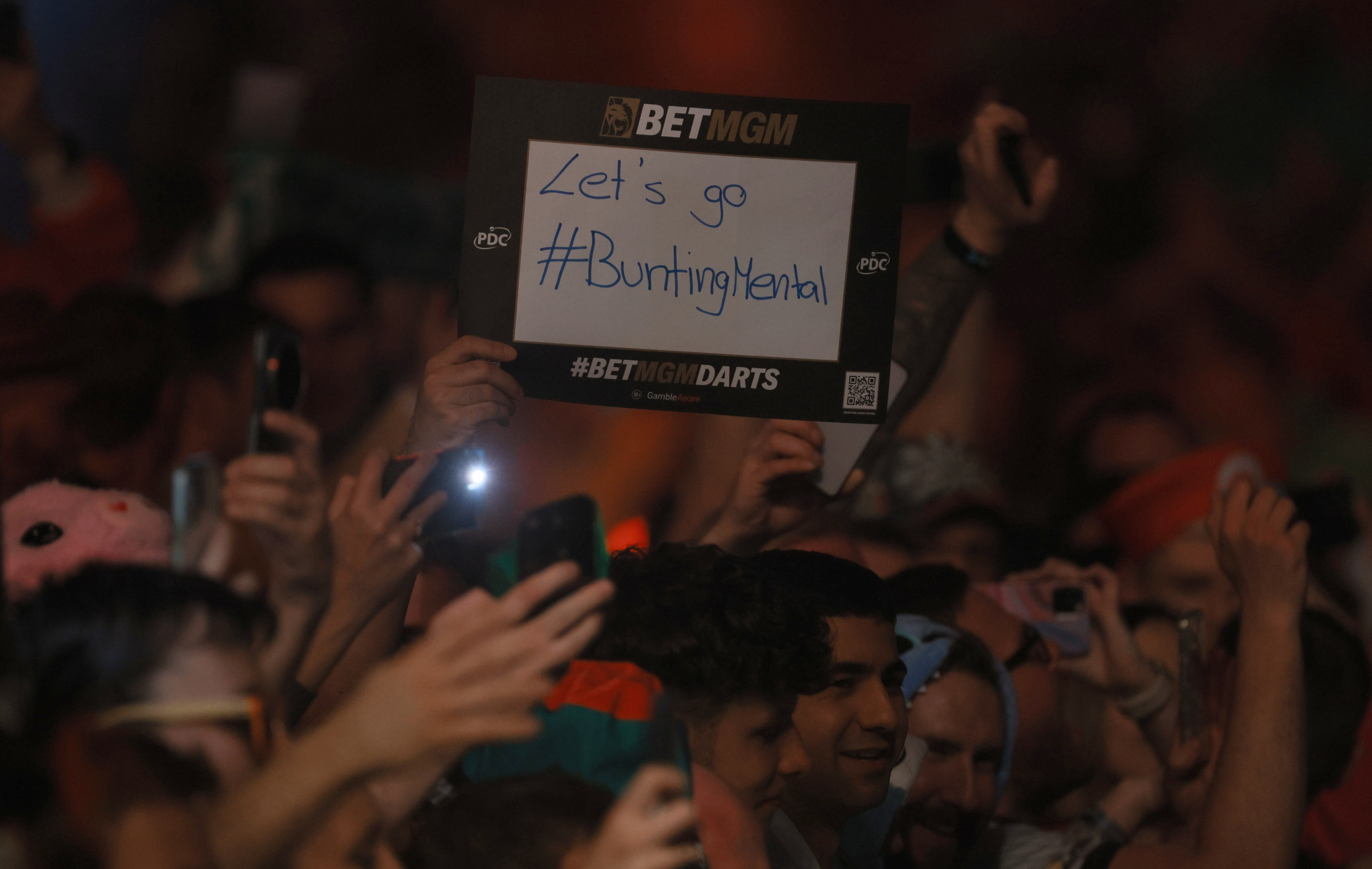
A "Let's go #BuntingMental" sign from a 2025 Premier League Darts event

Bunting proposed to his wife Keila in a Chinese restaurant; the couple have two sons. His eldest son Tobias is regularly seen cheering him on from the crowd at events. Bunting is a supporter of football club Liverpool and rugby league club St Helens R.F.C; he was the half-time guest for Liverpool's match against Aston Villa in January 2014 following his BDO World Championship win. He earned a brown belt in jiu-jitsu as a child.

He previously worked as the administrator for a darts supplier, but left his job to focus on practicing. He initially used "Surfin' Bird" by the Trashmen as his walk-on music as a nod to remarks that he resembles Peter Griffin from the animated show Family Guy, the song being long associated with the character. The resemblance was exemplified by a 2014 YouTube video of Bunting dancing to the song. He later decided to change his walk-on music to "Titanium" by David Guetta featuring Sia, his son Tobias's favourite song.

Bunting has been noted for his popularity on social media, particularly TikTok, where he started posting humorous videos at the recommendation of his son. His catchphrase "Let's go Bunting mental" (LGBM) became a popular tagline amongst darts fans, being used as a hashtag and being chanted by the crowd during his matches. These factors, as well as his walk-ons that feature him and the crowd singing along to "Titanium", have seen him be described as a "cult hero".

== World Championship results ==
=== BDO World Championship ===
- 2004: Second round (lost to Ted Hankey 0–3)
- 2005: First round (lost to John Henderson 0–3)
- 2009: First round (lost to Gary Robson 1–3)
- 2010: Second round (lost to Tony O'Shea 0–4)
- 2011: Quarter-finals (lost to Dean Winstanley 1–5)
- 2013: Second round (lost to Darryl Fitton 2–4)
- 2014: Winner (beat Alan Norris 7–4)

=== PDC World Championship ===
- 2015: Quarter-finals (lost to Raymond van Barneveld 4–5)
- 2016: Second round (lost to Raymond van Barneveld 3–4)
- 2017: First round (lost to Darren Webster 2–3)
- 2018: First round (lost to Dimitri Van den Bergh 1–3)
- 2019: Second round (lost to Luke Humphries 1–3)
- 2020: Fourth round (lost to Michael van Gerwen 0–4)
- 2021: Semi-finals (lost to Gerwyn Price 4–6)
- 2022: Second round (lost to Ross Smith 2–3)
- 2023: Quarter-finals (lost to Michael Smith 3–5)
- 2024: Fourth round (lost to Michael van Gerwen 0–4)
- 2025: Semi-finals (lost to Luke Littler 1–6)
- 2026: Third round (lost to James Hurrell 3–4)

== Career finals ==
=== BDO major finals: 5 (4 titles) ===
Legend
World Championship (1–0)
World Masters (2–0)
Zuiderduin Masters (1–1)

Outcome	No.	Year	Championship	Opponent in the final	Score (Note: (l) = score in legs, (s) = score in sets.)
Winner	1.	2012	World Masters (1)	(England) Tony O'Shea	7–4 (s)
Winner	2.	2012	Zuiderduin Masters (1)	(England) Alan Norris	5–0 (s)
Winner	3.	2013	World Masters (2)	(England) James Wilson	7–0 (s)
Runner-up	1.	2013	Zuiderduin Masters	(England) James Wilson	1–5 (s)
Winner	4.	2014	World Championship (1)	(England) Alan Norris	7–4 (s)

=== WDF major finals: 1 ===
Outcome	No.	Year	Championship	Opponent in the final	Score
Runner-up	1.	2013	World Cup Singles	(Netherlands) Wesley Harms	6–7 (s)

=== PDC major finals: 1 (1 title) ===
Legend
Masters (1–0)

Outcome	No.	Year	Championship	Opponent in the final	Score
Winner	1.	2024	Masters	Michael van Gerwen	11–7 (l)

=== PDC World Series finals: 5 (2 titles) ===
Outcome	No.	Year	Championship	Opponent in the final	Score
Runner-up	1.	2014	Sydney Masters	Phil Taylor	3–11 (l)
Winner	1.	2025	Bahrain Masters	Gerwyn Price	8–4 (l)
Runner-up	2.	2025	Dutch Masters	Rob Cross	5–8 (l)
Winner	2.	2025	Nordic Masters	Rob Cross	8–4 (l)
Runner-up	3.	2025	Poland Masters	Gerwyn Price	7–8 (l)

== Performance timeline ==
=== BDO ===
Tournament	2002	2003	2004	2005	2006	2007	2008	2009	2010	2011	2012	2013	2014
BDO Ranked televised events
World Championship	DNQ		2R	1R	DNQ			1R	2R	QF	DNQ	2R	W
International Darts League	NH	DNQ	RR	2R	DNQ		Not held						
World Darts Trophy	DNQ	1R	1R	1R	DNQ		Not held						
World Masters	2R	2R	4R	3R	2R	DNP	4R	5R	1R	QF	W	W	PDC
Finder Masters	DNP	QF	RR	DNQ	NH	DNP					W	F	PDC

=== PDC ===
Tournament	2012	2013	2014	2015	2016	2017	2018	2019	2020	2021	2022	2023	2024	2025	2026
PDC Ranked televised events
World Championship	Non-PDC			QF	2R	1R	1R	2R	4R	SF	2R	QF	4R	SF	3R
World Masters (Note: A non ranked event until 2025.)	NH	DNQ			1R	DNQ		QF	DNQ	1R	1R	2R	W	QF	2R
UK Open	2R	4R	4R	SF	5R	2R	4R	4R	6R	4R	5R	4R	QF	4R	6R
World Matchplay	Non-PDC		2R	1R	1R	1R	1R	QF	DNQ	1R	1R	1R	2R	QF	2R
World Grand Prix	Non-PDC		SF	1R	2R	1R	1R	2R	WD	SF	2R	2R	1R	2R	2R
European Championship	Non-PDC		QF	2R	2R	2R	1R	2R	DNQ		1R	2R	1R	1R	QF
Grand Slam (Note: A non ranked event until 2015.)	DNQ		QF	DNQ		2R	2R	DNQ		RR	DNQ	SF	2R	RR	RR
Players Championship Finals	Non-PDC		2R	1R	1R	3R	QF	QF	1R	1R	1R	QF	1R	2R	
PDC Non-ranked televised events
Premier League	DNP			8th	DNP				C	DNP				8th	5th
World Series Finals	Not held			QF	DNQ								1R	1R	1R
Career statistics
Year-end ranking	-	-	24	16	19	22	17	17	17	20	24	16	5	7	

==== European Tour ====
Season	1	2	3	4	5	6	7	8	9	10	11	12	13	14	15
2014	GDC; DNP	DDM; DNP	GDM; SF	ADO; 3R	GDT; DNQ	EDO; 2R	EDG; SF	EDT; 1R							
2015	GDC; 3R	GDT; 2R	GDM; DNQ	DDM; 2R	IDO; QF	EDO; 1R	EDT; 2R	EDM; 2R	EDG; 3R						
2016	DDM; 2R	GDM; 2R	GDT; 2R	EDM; DNQ	ADO; QF	EDO; SF	IDO; 2R	EDT; 2R	EDG; QF	GDC; 2R					
2017	GDC; 3R	GDM; 3R	GDO; 3R	EDG; 1R	GDT; 3R	EDM; QF	ADO; 2R	EDO; 3R	DDM; DNQ	GDG; DNQ	IDO; DNQ	EDT; 3R			
2018	EDO; DNQ	GDG; 2R	GDO; DNQ	ADO; DNQ	EDG; 1R	DDM; QF	GDT; 2R	DDO; 3R	EDM; SF	GDC; 2R	DDC; 2R	IDO; 3R	EDT; 3R		
2019	EDO; DNQ	GDC; QF	GDG; 3R	GDO; 1R	ADO; 3R	EDG; 1R	DDM; 2R	DDO; 3R	CDO; F	ADC; 1R	EDM; DNQ	IDO; DNQ	GDT; DNQ		
2020	BDC; 1R	GDC; DNQ	EDG; DNQ	IDO; 2R											
2021	HDT; DNQ	GDT; 1R													
2022	IDO; DNQ	GDC; DNQ	GDG; DNQ	ADO; SF	EDO; 1R	CDO; DNQ	EDG; 1R	DDC; DNQ	EDM; SF	HDT; 2R	GDO; DNQ	BDO; DNQ	GDT; 2R		
2023	BSD; 3R	EDO; 3R	IDO; DNQ	GDG; DNQ	ADO; 1R	DDC; QF	BDO; DNQ	CDO; 1R	EDG; DNQ	EDM; 3R	GDO; F	HDT; 1R	GDC; QF		
2024	BDO; QF	GDG; 2R	IDO; SF	EDG; 3R	ADO; SF	BSD; 3R	DDC; 2R	EDO; QF	GDC; 2R	FDT; 3R	HDT; QF	SDT; 3R	CDO; 2R		
2025	BDO; QF	EDT; WD	IDO; W	GDG; DNP	ADO; 2R	EDG; 2R	DDC; 2R	EDO; QF	BSD; 2R	FDT; 3R	CDO; QF	HDT; 2R	SDT; W	GDC; 2R	
2026	PDO; QF	EDT; 2R	BDO; 2R	GDG; DNP	EDG; 3R	ADO; DNP	IDO; 3R	BSD; 2R	SDO; 3R	EDO; 2R	HDT; 3R	CDO; 2R	FDT; 3R	SDT; 2R	DDC; SF

==== Players Championships ====
Season	1	2	3	4	5	6	7	8	9	10	11	12	13	14	15	16	17	18	19	20	21	22	23	24	25	26	27	28	29	30	31	32	33	34
2014	BAR; 2R	BAR; 1R	CRA; 3R	CRA; QF	WIG; 4R	WIG; 1R	WIG; 1R	WIG; SF	CRA; 2R	CRA; F	COV; 2R	COV; 2R	CRA; 3R	CRA; 3R	DUB; 1R	DUB; SF	CRA; 4R	CRA; 3R	COV; 3R	COV; 1R														
2015	BAR; 4R	BAR; 4R	BAR; 1R	BAR; 3R	BAR; 1R	COV; 1R	COV; 4R	COV; 1R	CRA; 1R	CRA; QF	BAR; QF	BAR; 1R	WIG; 4R	WIG; 1R	BAR; 3R	BAR; 3R	DUB; QF	DUB; QF	COV; SF	COV; QF														
2016	BAR; 1R	BAR; W	BAR; 2R	BAR; 2R	BAR; 1R	BAR; 1R	BAR; 2R	COV; 2R	COV; 3R	BAR; 2R	BAR; 4R	BAR; 4R	BAR; 1R	BAR; 4R	BAR; 4R	BAR; 4R	DUB; QF	DUB; 1R	BAR; QF	BAR; 3R														
2017	BAR; 1R	BAR; 1R	BAR; 1R	BAR; 1R	MIL; 3R	MIL; 2R	BAR; 1R	BAR; 2R	WIG; 1R	WIG; 1R	MIL; 3R	MIL; 1R	WIG; 2R	WIG; 1R	BAR; 2R	BAR; 3R	BAR; QF	BAR; SF	DUB; 4R	DUB; F	BAR; 2R	BAR; 2R												
2018	BAR; 3R	BAR; 1R	BAR; 3R	BAR; QF	MIL; 2R	MIL; QF	BAR; QF	BAR; 2R	WIG; 2R	WIG; SF	MIL; 2R	MIL; 3R	WIG; SF	WIG; 1R	BAR; 4R	BAR; 3R	BAR; 1R	BAR; 3R	DUB; 1R	DUB; 2R	BAR; QF	BAR; 2R												
2019	WIG; 3R	WIG; 1R	WIG; 1R	WIG; 1R	BAR; 1R	BAR; 1R	WIG; 3R	WIG; 1R	BAR; 1R	BAR; 1R	BAR; 2R	BAR; 4R	BAR; 3R	BAR; F	BAR; 1R	BAR; 1R	WIG; 4R	WIG; 2R	BAR; 1R	BAR; 2R	HIL; 1R	HIL; 3R	BAR; 2R	BAR; 1R	BAR; 1R	BAR; 2R	DUB; 2R	DUB; 1R	BAR; 4R	BAR; 3R				
2020	BAR; 2R	BAR; 2R	WIG; 4R	WIG; 2R	WIG; 2R	WIG; SF	BAR; 1R	BAR; 4R	MIL; 4R	MIL; 1R	MIL; QF	MIL; 2R	MIL; 1R	NIE; 3R	NIE; SF	NIE; 1R	NIE; 1R	NIE; 3R	COV; 2R	COV; 2R	COV; QF	COV; 3R	COV; 2R											
2021	BOL; 2R	BOL; 1R	BOL; 3R	BOL; 1R	MIL; 3R	MIL; 2R	MIL; 1R	MIL; 2R	NIE; 2R	NIE; 3R	NIE; 3R	NIE; 2R	MIL; 1R	MIL; 1R	MIL; SF	MIL; 1R	COV; W	COV; QF	COV; 2R	COV; 1R	BAR; 1R	BAR; 2R	BAR; 4R	BAR; 2R	BAR; 2R	BAR; 4R	BAR; 1R	BAR; 3R	BAR; 2R	BAR; 4R				
2022	BAR; 4R	BAR; QF	WIG; 3R	WIG; 3R	BAR; 4R	BAR; 1R	NIE; 3R	NIE; QF	BAR; 3R	BAR; 4R	BAR; 1R	BAR; 4R	BAR; 1R	WIG; 1R	WIG; 4R	NIE; 4R	NIE; 2R	BAR; 3R	BAR; 1R	BAR; 1R	BAR; 1R	BAR; QF	BAR; 1R	BAR; 2R	BAR; 1R	BAR; 2R	BAR; QF	BAR; 2R	BAR; 2R	BAR; QF				
2023	BAR; 4R	BAR; 4R	BAR; 1R	BAR; QF	BAR; 2R	BAR; 2R	HIL; 4R	HIL; 1R	WIG; 2R	WIG; 3R	LEI; 2R	LEI; 4R	HIL; 1R	HIL; 2R	LEI; 3R	LEI; 2R	HIL; 2R	HIL; SF	BAR; 1R	BAR; 4R	BAR; 3R	BAR; 4R	BAR; 3R	BAR; SF	BAR; 1R	BAR; 3R	BAR; 4R	BAR; 2R	BAR; 3R	BAR; 4R				
2024	WIG; 1R	WIG; 2R	LEI; 1R	LEI; 1R	HIL; F	HIL; 2R	LEI; 3R	LEI; 3R	HIL; QF	HIL; QF	HIL; 2R	HIL; 1R	MIL; 4R	MIL; 2R	MIL; 1R	MIL; 4R	MIL; 4R	MIL; 3R	MIL; 4R	WIG; F	WIG; QF	LEI; QF	LEI; 1R	WIG; F	WIG; F	WIG; F	WIG; QF	WIG; 2R	LEI; F	LEI; DNP				
2025	WIG; 3R	WIG; 4R	ROS; 1R	ROS; 4R	LEI; 2R	LEI; QF	HIL; DNP		LEI; 3R	LEI; QF	Did not participate						LEI; 4R	LEI; W	LEI; 1R	LEI; F	DNP			MIL; F	MIL; W	HIL; DNP		LEI; 4R	LEI; 4R	LEI; DNP	WIG; SF	WIG; SF	WIG; 2R	WIG; 1R
2026	HIL; DNP		WIG; F	WIG; 4R	LEI; DNP		LEI; 4R	LEI; 4R	WIG; 1R	WIG; 3R	MIL; 1R	MIL; 3R	HIL; DNP		LEI; SF	LEI; QF	LEI; QF	LEI; 1R	MIL; 1R	MIL; DNP	WIG; QF	WIG; SF	LEI; 3R	LEI; 1R	Did not participate								LEI; 2R	LEI

==== World Series ====
Tournament	2014	2015	2024	2025	2026
Sydney Masters	F	QF	Not held		
Dubai Masters	DNP	QF	Not held		
Perth Masters	DNP	1R	Not held		
Japan Masters	NH	QF	Not held		
Auckland Masters	NH	1R	Not held		
Bahrain Masters	Not held		DNP	W	QF
Nordic Masters	Not held		QF	W	1R
Poland Masters	Not held		QF	F	NH
Dutch Masters	Not held		DNP	F	NH
US Masters	Not held		DNP	1R	QF
Australian Masters	Not held		DNP	SF	QF
New Zealand Masters	Not held		DNP	QF	1R
Saudi Masters	Not held				QF

Performance Table Legend
W	Won the tournament	F	Finalist	SF	Semifinalist	QF	Quarterfinalist	#R; RR; L#	Lost in # round Round-robin; Last # stage	DQ	Disqualified
DNQ	Did not qualify	DNP	Did not participate	WD	Withdrew	NH	Tournament not held	#R; RR; L#	Lost in # round Round-robin; Last # stage	NYF	Not yet founded

== Titles ==
The following is a list of titles won by Stephen Bunting in his career.

BDO

- Majors (4)
  - 2012 (×2): World Masters, Zuiderduin Masters
  - 2013: World Masters
  - 2014: World Championship
- 2004 British Internationals
- 2008 Northern Ireland Open
- 2009 British Classic
- 2010: British Internationals, England Classic
- 2011: British Internationals, England Classic, Tops of Gent
- 2012: Gold Cup, Granite City Open, SunParcs Masters, Welsh Classic
- 2013: British Internationals, England Masters, England Matchplay, England Open, Isle of Man Open, Jersey Classic, Jersey Open, Mariflex Open, Welsh Open

PDC

- Majors (1)
  - 2024: Masters
- World Series (2)
  - 2025 (×2): Bahrain, Nordic
- Pro Tour (7)
  - European Tour (2)
    - 2025 (×2): International, Swiss
  - Players Championships (4)
    - 2016: 2
    - 2021: 17
    - 2025 (×2): 18, 25
  - 2014 UK Open Qualifier 2
