= Morihiro Hashimoto =

Japanese darts player (1977–2017)

Morihiro Hashimoto 橋本 守容
Personal information
- Nickname: "The Ogre"
- Born: 10 February 1977 Okayama Prefecture, Japan
- Died: 13 March 2017 (aged 40) Okayama Prefecture, Japan

Sport
- Sport: Darts
- Laterality: Right-handed
- Walk-on music: "Reach Up" by Perfecto Allstarz

Organisation (see split in darts)
- PDC: 2010–2017

PDC premier events – best performances
- World Championship: Last 64: 2011, 2014

Other tournament wins
- Years
PDC Japanese Qualifier	2010, 2013
Medal record
Men's Darts
Representing Japan
WDF Asia-Pacific Cup
Silver medal – second place	2010 Tokyo	Men's singles
Silver medal – second place	2010 Tokyo	Team event
Bronze medal – third place	2010 Tokyo	Men's pairs

Morihiro Hashimoto (橋本 守容, Hashimoto Morihiro; 10 February 1977 – 13 March 2017) was a Japanese darts player, nicknamed The Ogre.

== Career ==
Hashimoto first appeared in the PDC circuit competing in the 2009 Las Vegas Desert Classic qualifiers, as well as a Players Championship. He attempted to qualify for the 2010 PDC World Darts Championship, but lost in the final of the Japanese Qualifying event to Haruki Muramatsu. In September 2010, Hashimoto won through the qualifier, beating Mitsumasa Hoshino in the final and qualified for the 2011 PDC World Darts Championship. A month later, he was a quarter-finalist in the Japan Open and in November, he reached the final of the WDF Asia-Pacific Cup men's singles, losing to New Zealand's Koha Kokiri.

Hashimoto was drawn in the preliminary round against PDPA qualifier Matt Padgett and quickly became popular with the crowd. After winning his first leg, levelling the match at 1–1, the crowd started chanting his name to the tune of "Reach Up (Papa's Got a Brand New Pigbag)", which was used as a walk on by Adrian Lewis. Hashimoto went on to win the match by 4 legs to 2 and become the second Japanese qualifier to win through the preliminary round after Muramatsu. The song, performed by the Perfecto Allstarz, was played at the end of the match instead of the traditional "Chase the Sun" by Planet Funk, and Hashimoto would have it played as his walk on for his first round match against Gary Anderson. He would not win a leg as Anderson whitewashed him 3–0 in sets. After the match, Hashimoto, speaking English, thanked the crowd for their support.

Hashimoto represented Japan with Haruki Muramatsu in the 2012 PDC World Cup of Darts and together they were beaten 5–2 by Sweden in the first round.

Hashimoto beat Muramatsu 6–5 in the final of the Japanese qualifying tournament for the 2014 World Championship. He saw off Paul Lim 4–2 in the preliminary round and won the opening set in his first round match against Michael Smith, but went on to lose 3–1. In June, Hashimoto and Muramatsu watched as Canada missed seven darts for the match in the first round of the World Cup of Darts to step in and steal a 5–4 win. In the second round they both lost their singles matches against the Northern Irish partnering of Brendan Dolan and Michael Mansell to exit the tournament. A year later, after whitewashing China 5–0, they were knocked out at the same stage this time by the top seeds England. Hashimoto lost 6–2 in the first round of the inaugural Japan Darts Masters to James Wade.

== Death ==
Hashimoto died suddenly on 13 March 2017 of a brain haemorrhage. His death was confirmed by his sponsor, Monster Barrels, on their Facebook page. A number of darts players paid tribute to him including Gary Anderson, Hashimoto's opponent in the first round of the 2011 World Championship. He also received condolences from the official PDC website.

== World Championship results ==
=== PDC ===
- 2011: First round (lost to Gary Anderson 0–3)
- 2014: First round (lost to Michael Smith 1–3)
