= 2015 Perth Darts Masters =

Tournament information
- Dates: 14–16 August 2015
- Venue: HBF Stadium
- Location: Perth
- Country: Australia
- Organisation(s): PDC
- Format: Legs
- Prize fund: A$200,000
- Winner's share: A$60,000
- High checkout: 130 (England) Phil Taylor (England) James Wade

Champion(s)
- (England) Phil Taylor

The 2015 Perth Darts Masters was the second staging of the tournament by the Professional Darts Corporation, as a third entry in the 2015 World Series of Darts. The tournament featured 16 players (eight top PDC Players facing eight regional qualifiers) and was held at the HBF Stadium in Perth, Western Australia from 14–16 August 2015.

Phil Taylor was the defending champion after defeating Michael van Gerwen 11–9 in the last year's final. He successfully defended his title after beating James Wade 11–7 in the final.

== Prize money ==
The total prize fund was A$200,000.

Position (no. of players)		Prize money (Total: A$200,000)
Winner	(1)	A$60,000
Runner-up	(1)	A$30,000
Semi-finalists	(2)	A$15,000
Quarter-finalists	(4)	A$10,000
First round	(8)	A$5,000

== Qualifiers ==
The eight seeded PDC players were:

1. (England) Phil Taylor (winner)
2. (Netherlands) Michael van Gerwen (semi-finals)
3. (Scotland) Peter Wright (quarter-finals)
4. (Scotland) Gary Anderson (semi-finals)
5. (England) Adrian Lewis (quarter-finals)
6. (England) James Wade (runner-up)
7. (Netherlands) Raymond van Barneveld (quarter-finals)
8. (England) Stephen Bunting (first round)

The Oceanic qualifiers were:

- (Australia) Simon Whitlock (first round)
- (Australia) Paul Nicholson (first round)
- (Australia) Kyle Anderson (quarter-finals)
- (Australia) Laurence Ryder (first round)
- (New Zealand) Craig Caldwell (first round)
- (Australia) David Platt (first round)
- (Australia) Adam Rowe (first round)
- (Australia) Kim Lewis (first round)

== Draw ==
First round (best of 11 legs); 14 August
1	(England) Phil Taylor 99.97	6
(New Zealand) Craig Caldwell 90.35	1
8	(England) Stephen Bunting 98.28	5
(Australia) Kyle Anderson 94.46	6
5	(England) Adrian Lewis 89.14	6
(Australia) Laurence Ryder 87.24	1
4	(Scotland) Gary Anderson 98.02	6
(Australia) Kim Lewis 77.97	0
2	(Netherlands) Michael van Gerwen 105.69	6
(Australia) David Platt 92.84	4
7	(Netherlands) Raymond van Barneveld 102.96	6
(Australia) Simon Whitlock 99.84	3
6	(England) James Wade 94.11	6
(Australia) Adam Rowe 81.31	1
3	(Scotland) Peter Wright 89.43	6
(Australia) Paul Nicholson 79.04	2

Quarter-finals (best of 15 legs); 15 August
1	(England) Phil Taylor 99.32	8
(Australia) Kyle Anderson 93.86	3
5	(England) Adrian Lewis 91.02	7
4	(Scotland) Gary Anderson 94.24	8
2	(Netherlands) Michael van Gerwen 105.19	8
7	(Netherlands) Raymond van Barneveld 102.75	4
6	(England) James Wade 94.85	8
3	(Scotland) Peter Wright 88.27	2

Semi-finals (best of 19 legs); 16 August
1	(England) Phil Taylor 108.50	10
4	(Scotland) Gary Anderson 104.39	5
2	(Netherlands) Michael van Gerwen 95.79	9
6	(England) James Wade 100.55	10

Final (best of 21 legs); 16 August
1	(England) Phil Taylor 98.95	11
6	(England) James Wade 99.15	7

== Broadcasting ==
The tournament was available in the following countries on these channels:

Country	Channel
Australia	Fox Sports
New Zealand	Sky Sport (New Zealand)
Asia	Fox Channel Asia
United Kingdom	ITV4
Netherlands	RTL 7
Middle East/North Africa	OSN
(Republic of Ireland) Ireland	Setanta Sports
China	PPTV (online)
