= 2015 Japan Darts Masters =

Tournament information
- Dates: 27–28 June 2015
- Venue: Osanbashi Hall
- Location: Yokohama
- Country: Japan
- Organisation(s): PDC
- Format: Legs
- Prize fund: $200,000
- Winner's share: $50,000
- High checkout: 145 Raymond van Barneveld

Champion(s)
- (England) Phil Taylor

The 2015 Japan Darts Masters (also known as the Zipang Casino Japan Darts Masters) was the inaugural staging of the tournament by the Professional Darts Corporation, as a second entry in the 2015 World Series of Darts. The tournament featured eight Japanese players who faced eight PDC players and was held at the Osanbashi Hall in Yokohama, Japan from 27–28 June 2015.

Phil Taylor won the inaugural staging of the Japan Darts Masters after defeating Peter Wright 8–7 in the final.

== Prize money ==
The total prize fund was $200,000.

Position (no. of players)		Prize money (Total: $200,000)
Winner	(1)	$50,000
Runner-up	(1)	$30,000
Semi-finalists	(2)	$20,000
Quarter-finalists	(4)	$10,000
First round	(8)	$5,000

== Qualifiers ==
The eight seeded PDC players were:

1. (Netherlands) Michael van Gerwen (semi-finals)
2. (England) Phil Taylor (winner)
3. (Scotland) Gary Anderson (semi-finals)
4. (England) Adrian Lewis (quarter-finals)
5. (Scotland) Peter Wright (runner-up)
6. (England) James Wade (quarter-finals)
7. (Netherlands) Raymond van Barneveld (quarter-finals)
8. (England) Stephen Bunting (quarter-finals)

The Japanese qualifiers were:

- (Japan) Haruki Muramatsu (first round)
- (Japan) Morihiro Hashimoto (first round)
- (Japan) Sho Katsumi (first round)
- (Japan) Masumi Chino (first round)
- (Japan) Katsuya Aiba (first round)
- (Japan) Yuki Yamada (first round)
- (Japan) Shintaro Inoue (first round)
- (Japan) Chikara Fujimori (first round)

== Draw ==
First round (best of 11 legs); 27 June
1	(Netherlands) Michael van Gerwen 89.29	6
(Japan) Chikara Fujimori 70.06	0
8	(England) Stephen Bunting 93.90	6
(Japan) Shintaro Inoue 82.63	1
5	(Scotland) Peter Wright 102.28	6
(Japan) Haruki Muramatsu 90.26	1
4	(England) Adrian Lewis 85.89	6
(Japan) Sho Katsumi 72.73	0
2	(England) Phil Taylor 98.16	6
(Japan) Masumi Chino 84.78	2
7	(Netherlands) Raymond van Barneveld 82.95	6
(Japan) Katsuya Aiba 73.02	4
6	(England) James Wade 89.28	6
(Japan) Morihiro Hashimoto 75.28	2
3	(Scotland) Gary Anderson 98.97	6
(Japan) Yuki Yamada 86.06	2

Quarter-finals (best of 15 legs); 28 June
1	(Netherlands) Michael van Gerwen 106.34	8
8	(England) Stephen Bunting 98.76	5
5	(Scotland) Peter Wright 103.31	8
4	(England) Adrian Lewis 100.72	4
2	(England) Phil Taylor 90.00	8
7	(Netherlands) Raymond van Barneveld 84.03	3
6	(England) James Wade 95.93	1
3	(Scotland) Gary Anderson 102.99	8

Semi-finals (best of 15 legs); 28 June
1	(Netherlands) Michael van Gerwen 100.04	7
5	(Scotland) Peter Wright 100.12	8
2	(England) Phil Taylor 105.71	8
3	(Scotland) Gary Anderson 101.69	7

Final (best of 15 legs); 28 June
5	(Scotland) Peter Wright 94.09	7
2	(England) Phil Taylor 98.34	8

== Broadcasting ==
The tournament was available in the following countries on these channels:

Country	Channel
Japan	J Sports
United Kingdom	ITV4
Middle East and North Africa	OSN
Australia	Fox Sports (Australia)
New Zealand	Sky Sport (New Zealand)
(Republic of Ireland) Ireland	Setanta Sports
Netherlands	RTL 7
Asia	Fox Asia
China	PPTV (online)
