= 2015 Dubai Duty Free Darts Masters =

Tournament information
- Dates: 28–29 May 2015
- Venue: Dubai Tennis Centre
- Location: Dubai
- Country: United Arab Emirates
- Organisation(s): PDC
- Format: Legs; Final – best of 21 legs
- Prize fund: AED750,000
- Winner's share: AED220,000
- High checkout: 170 (Scotland) Gary Anderson

Champion(s)
- (Netherlands) Michael van Gerwen

The 2015 Dubai Duty Free Darts Masters was the third staging of the tournament organised by the Professional Darts Corporation. It was the first World Series of Darts event of 2015. The tournament featured the top six players according to the Order of Merit, plus two wildcards, competing in a knockout system. The tournament was held at the Dubai Tennis Centre in Dubai over 28–29 May 2015.

Michael van Gerwen was the defending champion after he retained his 2014 title last year by defeating Peter Wright 11–7 in the final. He maintained his unbeaten run in the event to win it for the third time with an 11–8 victory over Phil Taylor in the final.

== Prize money ==
The total prize fund was AED750,000.

Position (no. of players)		Prize money (Total: AED750,000)
Winner	(1)	AED220,000
Runner-up	(1)	AED110,000
Semi-finalists	(2)	AED85,000
Quarter-finalists	(4)	AED62,500

== Qualifiers ==
The top six players on the PDC Order of Merit after the 2015 World Championship qualified for the event (with the top 4 seeded). They were joined by two wildcards. These were:

1. (Netherlands) Michael van Gerwen (winner)
2. (England) Phil Taylor (runner-up)
3. (Scotland) Gary Anderson (semi-finals)
4. (England) Adrian Lewis (semi-finals)
5. (Scotland) Peter Wright (quarter-finals)
6. (England) James Wade (quarter-finals)

Wildcards:

- (England) Stephen Bunting (quarter-finals)
- (Netherlands) Raymond van Barneveld (quarter-finals)

== Draw ==
Quarter-finals; Best of 19 legs
1	(Netherlands) Michael van Gerwen 106.80	10
(Netherlands) Raymond van Barneveld 90.79	8
4	(England) Adrian Lewis 105.68	10
(England) Stephen Bunting 101.68	9
2	(England) Phil Taylor 101.30	10
(Scotland) Peter Wright 95.10	5
3	(Scotland) Gary Anderson 98.80	10
(England) James Wade 100.80	8

Semi-finals; Best of 21 legs
1	(Netherlands) Michael van Gerwen 99.90	11
4	(England) Adrian Lewis 96.20	9
2	(England) Phil Taylor 99.39	11
3	(Scotland) Gary Anderson 97.91	3

Final; Best of 21 legs
1	(Netherlands) Michael van Gerwen 106.86	11
2	(England) Phil Taylor 107.07	8

== Broadcasting ==
The tournament was available in the following territories on these channels.

Country	Channel
United Kingdom	ITV 4
(Emirate of Dubai) Dubai	Dubai Sports TV
Middle East and North Africa	OSN
Australia	Fox Sports
New Zealand	Sky Sport (New Zealand)
Netherlands	RTL7
Asia	Fox Sports
