= 2015 Sydney Darts Masters =

Tournament information
- Dates: 20–22 August 2015
- Venue: Qantas Credit Union Arena
- Location: Sydney
- Country: Australia
- Organisation(s): PDC
- Format: Legs; Final — best of 21 legs
- Prize fund: A$220,000
- Winner's share: A$60,000
- Nine-dart finish: (England) Phil Taylor
- High checkout: 167 (England) Adrian Lewis

Champion(s)
- (England) Phil Taylor

The 2015 Sydney Darts Masters was the third staging of the tournament by the Professional Darts Corporation, as a fourth entry in the 2015 World Series of Darts. The tournament featured 16 players (eight top PDC Players facing eight regional qualifiers) and was held at the Sydney Entertainment Centre in Sydney, Australia from 20–22 August 2015.

Phil Taylor was the defending champion after defeating Stephen Bunting 11–3 in the last year's final and he remained the only player to have won this event by claiming his third title with an 11–3 victory over Adrian Lewis. He also hit the first ever nine-dart finish in a World Series of Darts match, when he hit one in his semi-final victory over Peter Wright, which was Taylor's last televised nine-dart finish in his career.

== Prize money ==
The total prize fund was A$220,000.

Position (no. of players)		Prize money (Total: A$220,000)
Winner	(1)	A$60,000
Runner-up	(1)	A$40,000
Semi-finalists	(2)	A$20,000
Quarter-finalists	(4)	A$10,000
First round	(8)	A$5,000

== Qualifiers ==
The eight seeded PDC players were:

1. (England) Phil Taylor (winner)
2. (Netherlands) Michael van Gerwen (quarter-finals)
3. (Scotland) Gary Anderson (quarter-finals)
4. (Scotland) Peter Wright (semi-finals)
5. (England) James Wade (quarter-finals)
6. (England) Adrian Lewis (runner-up)
7. (Netherlands) Raymond van Barneveld (semi-finals)
8. (England) Stephen Bunting (quarter-finals)

The Oceanic qualifiers were:

- (Australia) Simon Whitlock (first round)
- (Australia) Paul Nicholson (first round)
- (Australia) Laurence Ryder (first round)
- (Australia) David Platt (first round)
- (New Zealand) Craig Caldwell (first round)
- (New Zealand) Cody Harris (first round)
- (Australia) Tic Bridge (first round)
- (New Zealand) Warren Parry (first round)

== Draw ==
First round (best of 11 legs); 20 August
1	(England) Phil Taylor 100.34	6
(Australia) Tic Bridge 86.02	2
8	(England) Stephen Bunting 98.48	6
(Australia) David Platt 83.27	1
5	(England) James Wade 91.63	6
(New Zealand) Craig Caldwell 83.34	2
4	(Scotland) Peter Wright 92.85	6
(Australia) Laurence Ryder 84.70	3
2	(Netherlands) Michael van Gerwen 95.13	6
(Australia) Paul Nicholson 85.81	2
7	(Netherlands) Raymond van Barneveld 90.48	6
(New Zealand) Cody Harris 84.77	3
6	(England) Adrian Lewis 93.95	6
(Australia) Simon Whitlock 87.54	5
3	(Scotland) Gary Anderson 95.94	6
(New Zealand) Warren Parry 72.90	0

Quarter-finals (best of 15 legs); 21 August
1	(England) Phil Taylor 101.67	8
8	(England) Stephen Bunting 92.29	2
5	(England) James Wade 97.02	6
4	(Scotland) Peter Wright 96.78	8
2	(Netherlands) Michael van Gerwen 99.02	4
7	(Netherlands) Raymond van Barneveld 101.82	8
6	(England) Adrian Lewis 93.86	8
3	(Scotland) Gary Anderson 105.31	7

Semi-finals (best of 19 legs); 22 August
1	(England) Phil Taylor 98.32	10
4	(Scotland) Peter Wright 94.72	7
7	(Netherlands) Raymond van Barneveld 93.08	9
6	(England) Adrian Lewis 93.08	10

Final (best of 21 legs); 22 August
1	(England) Phil Taylor 99.63	11
6	(England) Adrian Lewis 94.25	3

== Broadcasting ==
The tournament was available in the following countries on these channels:

Country	Channel
Australia	Fox Sports
New Zealand	Sky Sport (New Zealand)
Asia	Fox Channel Asia
United Kingdom	ITV4
Netherlands	RTL 7
Middle East/North Africa	OSN
(Republic of Ireland) Ireland	Setanta Sports
China	PPTV (online)
