= 2015 Auckland Darts Masters =

2015 TAB & Burger King Auckland Darts Masters

Tournament information
- Dates: 28–30 August 2015
- Venue: The Trusts Arena
- Location: Auckland
- Country: New Zealand
- Organisation(s): PDC
- Format: Legs
- Prize fund: NZ$220,000
- Winner's share: NZ$70,000
- High checkout: 170 (England) Phil Taylor

Champion(s)
- (England) Adrian Lewis

The 2015 TAB & Burger King Auckland Darts Masters was the inaugural staging of the tournament by the Professional Darts Corporation, as a fifth and final entry in the 2015 World Series of Darts. The tournament featured 16 players (eight PDC players facing eight regional qualifiers) and was held at The Trusts Arena in Auckland, New Zealand from 28–30 August 2015.

Adrian Lewis won the first edition of the tournament after defeating Raymond van Barneveld 11–10 in the final.

== Prize money ==
The total prize fund was NZ$220,000.

Position (no. of players)		Prize money (Total: NZ$220,000)
Winner	(1)	NZ$70,000
Runner-up	(1)	NZ$35,000
Semi-finalists	(2)	NZ$17,500
Quarter-finalists	(4)	NZ$10,000
First round	(8)	NZ$5,000

== Qualifiers ==
The eight seeded PDC players were:

1. (England) Phil Taylor (semi-finals)
2. (Netherlands) Michael van Gerwen (quarter-finals)
3. (Scotland) Peter Wright (quarter-finals)
4. (England) Adrian Lewis (winner)
5. (Scotland) Gary Anderson (quarter-finals)
6. (England) James Wade (semi-finals)
7. (Netherlands) Raymond van Barneveld (runner-up)
8. (England) Stephen Bunting (first round)

The Oceanic qualifiers were:

- (Australia) Simon Whitlock (quarter-finals)
- (Australia) Paul Nicholson (first round)
- (Australia) David Platt (first round)
- (New Zealand) Rob Szabo (first round)
- (Australia) Laurence Ryder (first round)
- (New Zealand) Mark Cleaver (first round)
- (Australia) Rob Modra (first round)
- (New Zealand) Craig Caldwell (first round)

== Draw ==
First round (best of 11 legs); 28 August
1	(England) Phil Taylor 104.86	6
(New Zealand) Craig Caldwell 87.93	0
8	(England) Stephen Bunting 96.50	4
(Australia) Simon Whitlock 92.55	6
5	(Scotland) Gary Anderson 95.88	6
(Australia) Rob Modra 89.28	5
4	(England) Adrian Lewis 101.97	6
(Australia) David Platt 82.99	2
2	(Netherlands) Michael van Gerwen 102.18	6
(New Zealand) Rob Szabo 85.72	3
7	(Netherlands) Raymond van Barneveld 98.02	6
(Australia) Laurence Ryder 86.24	0
6	(England) James Wade 91.89	6
(Australia) Paul Nicholson 89.98	3
3	(Scotland) Peter Wright 87.61	6
(New Zealand) Mark Cleaver 77.73	1

Quarter-finals (best of 15 legs); 29 August
1	(England) Phil Taylor 107.37	8
(Australia) Simon Whitlock 93.46	3
5	(Scotland) Gary Anderson 100.79	4
4	(England) Adrian Lewis 100.23	8
2	(Netherlands) Michael van Gerwen 93.31	7
7	(Netherlands) Raymond van Barneveld 91.49	8
6	(England) James Wade 99.33	8
3	(Scotland) Peter Wright 98.06	5

Semi-finals (best of 19 legs); 30 August
1	(England) Phil Taylor 99.57	9
4	(England) Adrian Lewis 100.56	10
7	(Netherlands) Raymond van Barneveld 100.43	10
6	(England) James Wade 96.70	6

Final (best of 21 legs); 30 August
4	(England) Adrian Lewis 103.16	11
7	(Netherlands) Raymond van Barneveld 97.70	10
