= Adrian Lewis =

English darts player (born 1985)

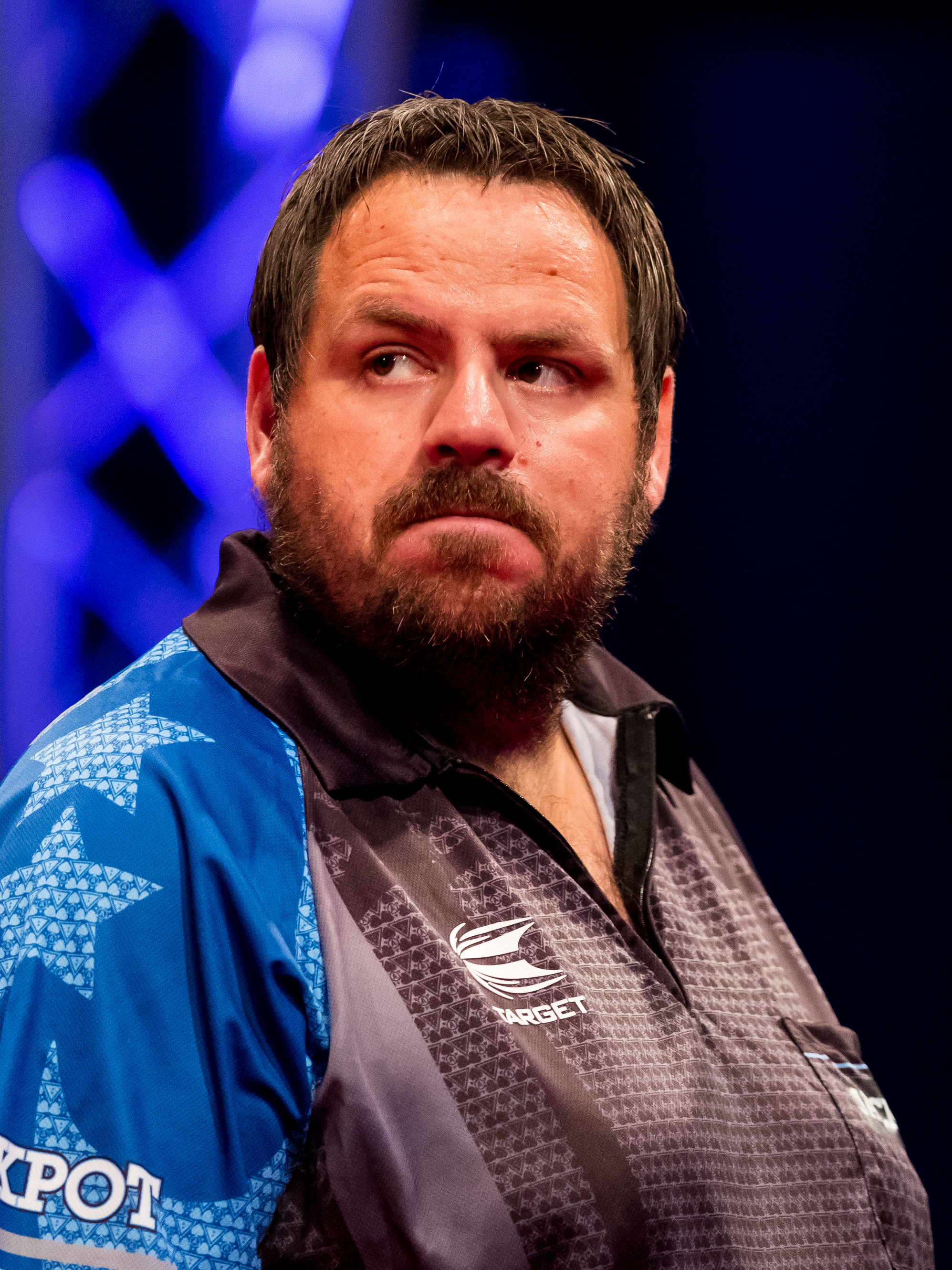
- Lewis in 2019

Personal information
- Nickname: Jackpot
- Born: 21 January 1985 (age 41) Stoke-on-Trent, England

Sport
- Sport: Darts
- Playing since: 1995
- Darts: 22g Target Signature
- Laterality: Right-handed
- Walk-on music: "Reach Up (Papa's Got a Brand New Pigbag)" by Perfecto Allstarz

Organisation (see split in darts)
- BDO: 2003
- PDC: 2004–2024 (Tour Card: 2011–2024)

WDF major events – best performances
- World Masters: Last 128: 2003
- World Trophy: Last 16: 2005

PDC premier events – best performances
- World Championship: Winner (2): 2011, 2012
- World Matchplay: Runner-up: 2013
- World Grand Prix: Runner-up: 2010
- UK Open: Winner (1): 2014
- Grand Slam: Semi-final: 2011, 2013
- European Championship: Winner (1): 2013
- Premier League: Runner-up: 2011
- Desert Classic: Quarter-final: 2007, 2009
- PC Finals: Runner-up: 2014, 2015
- Masters: Runner-up: 2013
- Champions League: Group Stage: 2016, 2017

Other tournament wins
- Years
PDC World Cup of Darts (team event)	2012, 2013, 2015, 2016
British Teenage Open	2003
Chris de Roo Open	2006
Players Championships (x12)
2005, 2006, 2009, 2010 (x2), 2013, 2015 (x2), 2017, 2019, 2022
UK Open Qualifiers (x4)
2005, 2011, 2015, 2016
European Tour Events
German Darts Masters	2012
World Series of Darts
Auckland Darts Masters	2015

Adrian Lewis (born 21 January 1985) is an English professional darts player who formerly competed in Professional Darts Corporation (PDC) events. Nicknamed "Jackpot", he is a two-time PDC World Champion, having won the title in 2011 and 2012, and has won two other major televised PDC titles, the European Championship in 2013 and the UK Open in 2014. He is a four-time winner of the PDC World Cup of Darts, as part of the England team alongside Phil Taylor.

Regarded as one of the greatest players in the history of the sport (Note: Attributed to multiple references:) and one of the most naturally talented darts players of all time, (Note: Attributed to multiple references:) Lewis has won a total of 26 PDC titles in his career. After withdrawing from multiple PDC events, he announced in April 2023 that he was taking a break from competitive darts, due in part to health issues affecting his wife and daughter.

== Career ==
=== Early career ===
Lewis was born in Stoke-on-Trent and had shown his potential at the age of 18 by winning the 2003 British Teenage Open. His professional career began in the British Darts Organisation (BDO) events but he only competed in one major tournament, the 2003 World Masters, losing in the last 128. Lewis then joined the Professional Darts Corporation (PDC) without ever qualifying for the BDO World Championship.

Lewis reached a semi-final of the regional qualifiers for the 2004 UK Open, which provided his opportunity for a television debut in Bolton, where he narrowly lost 7–8 to Dennis Harbour in the last 64. His next television appearance came against his mentor Phil Taylor at the 2004 Las Vegas Desert Classic where he went out 0–2 in the first round. He then went on to win his first match on television at the 2004 World Grand Prix beating former world champion Richie Burnett, before losing to Gary Welding. His first professional ranking title came in September 2004, when he won the Chris de Roo Open after defeating Colin Lloyd in the final.

He failed to qualify for the 2005 World Championship, but back at Bolton for the 2005 UK Open he produced one of the rare whitewashes in the tournament's history, beating Colin Monk 11–0 before falling 11–8 to Chris Mason in the last 16. In 2005, Lewis took on the nickname "Jackpot" as he won a jackpot gambling in Las Vegas that year, but he was unable to collect the money as he was 20 years old, below the US legal gambling age of 21.

=== Major breakthrough ===
In late 2005, Lewis began to produce some promising results, including reaching his first major event quarter-final in the 2005 World Matchplay, where he lost to Colin Lloyd. This result saw him break into the top 32 in the world for the first time. He then became the first player to win both PDC Pro Tour events during a weekend by taking the PDPA Players Championship and the UK Open Scottish Regional titles.

Lewis made his PDC World Championship debut in 2006, reaching the quarter-finals by defeating Dave Honey, Dennis Priestley and Roland Scholten. In the quarter-final Lewis was involved in a now infamous match against Peter Manley. When 2–1 down, Lewis successfully hit a blind 180, turning to face Manley as the last dart was in the air. Manley won the set and then appeared to say something while Lewis was throwing, which caused Lewis to leave the stage. Lewis did return, but went on to lose the match 5–3.

His biggest breakthrough came in May 2006 when he joined the 15 other PDC players in the top-16 competing against 16 American qualifiers in the World Series of Darts which was broadcast on ESPN. Lewis' performance in this tournament made others refer to him as a major threat in years to come. He beat Lloyd 6–5, Denis Ovens 9–6 and Priestley 11–1 before falling in the final 13–5 to Taylor. His ranking continued to rise by reaching the latter stages of the non-televised PDC Pro Tour events during 2006 (including winning a Scottish Players Championship) as well as the last 16 of the UK Open, having beaten Wayne Mardle 11–10 in the last 32, before losing to John MaGowan 11–6.

=== 2007–2010 ===
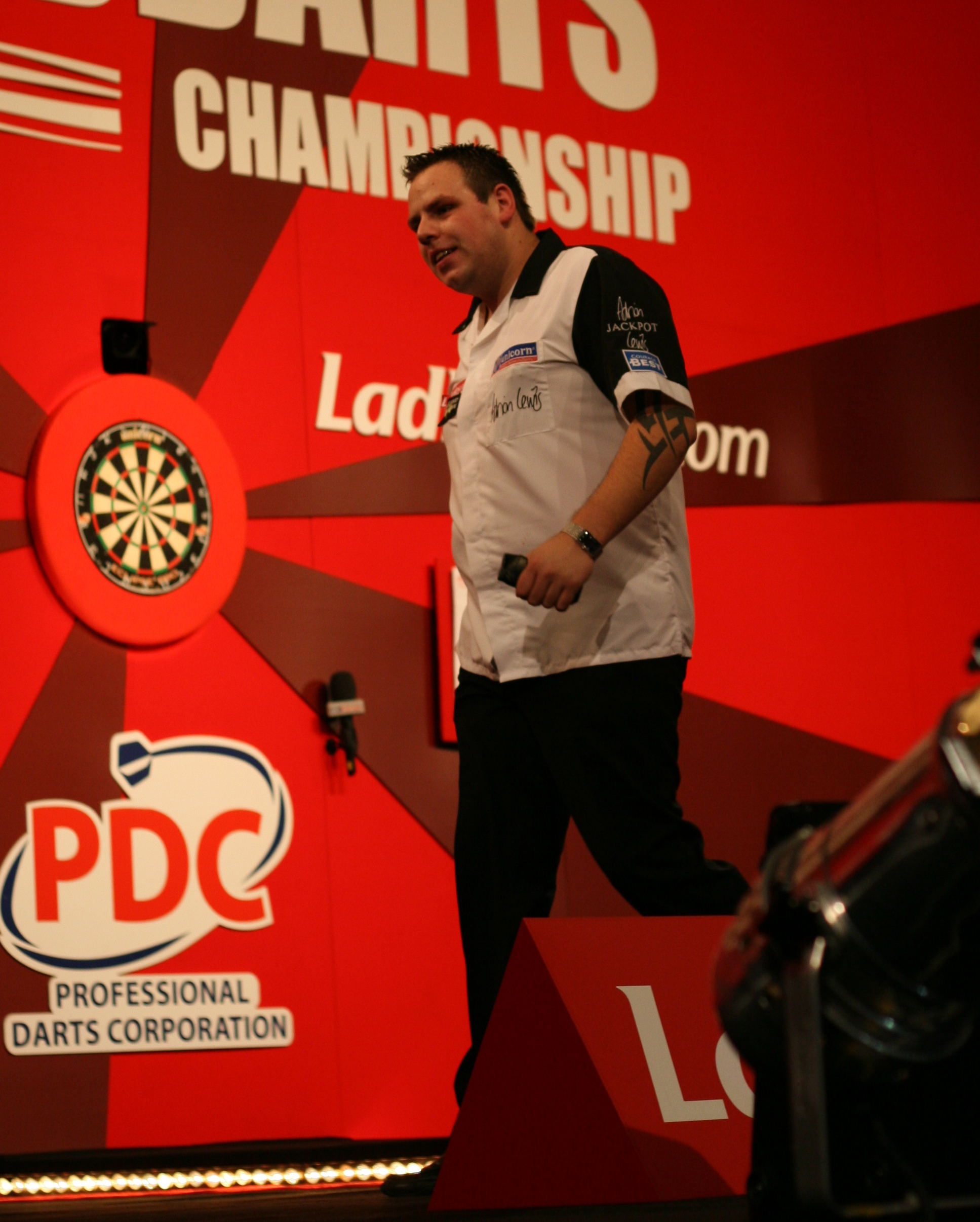
Lewis in 2007

Between 2007 and 2010, Lewis produced inconsistent form and was often unable to follow up on big wins such as at the 2007 World Matchplay in Blackpool where he beat the incumbent world champion Raymond van Barneveld 16–14 in the quarter-finals before losing heavily 17–7 in the semi-finals to James Wade.

He lost to Andy Jenkins in the last 16 of the 2007 World Championship, but was selected by Sky Sports as a wildcard for the 2007 Premier League. Lewis finished seventh in the league, winning five of his fourteen matches. Lewis also advanced to the semi-finals of the International Darts League, but was thrashed 9–1 by Gary Anderson.

He reached the quarter-finals of the World Championship for the second time in 2008, but was defeated 5–2 by Kevin Painter. He fared much better in the Premier League this year by finishing fourth in the table to advance to the play-offs where Taylor comfortably beat him 11–1. At the 2008 European Darts Championship, Lewis played his first-round match against Hannes Schnier with three plasters on his non-throwing hand – having attempted to catch a falling glass backstage which shattered in his hand. After winning the match 5–2, Lewis was taken to hospital for checks on two deep cuts. Lewis went on to beat Ovens 9–5 before producing at the time arguably the best performance of his career with a 9–2 victory over van Barneveld in the quarter-finals. An 11–7 victory over Manley set up a final with Taylor. Lewis lost 11–5 but his performance in the tournament guaranteed him a place in the 2008 Grand Slam of Darts.

Lewis was defeated in the second round of the 2009 World Championship 3–4 by Paul Nicholson but did manage to end his title drought in September. He won his first PDC Pro Tour event in three years at the Austrian Players Championship, where he beat Carlos Rodriguez 6–4 in the final, which included a nine dart finish. He dedicated his victory to his one-month-old daughter. He added another Pro Tour title the following month at the Irish Open Players Championship beating Andy Hamilton in the final by 6 legs to 4.

His form on television also improved during 2009 reaching the quarter-finals of the Las Vegas Desert Classic, World Matchplay and World Grand Prix. During 2010 he also made the last eight of the World Championship, Players Championships and UK Open before reaching his first televised final on Sky Television in the 2010 World Grand Prix where he beat Phil Taylor for the first time on television in the semi-finals but lost to James Wade in the final. There were further title successes in 2010, when he won Players Championships in Crawley and Germany to bring his overall Pro Tour title tally to seven.

=== 2011 season ===
==== World Championship win ====
Lewis reached the final of the 2011 PDC World Darts Championship courtesy of victories over Tony Eccles, Mark Dudbridge, Robert Thornton, Vincent van der Voort and Mark Webster en route to the final, where he played Gary Anderson. The match-up ensured that, for the first time, the winner of the PDC World Championship would not have previously succeeded in the rival BDO World Championship. Lewis himself became the only player to have reached the PDC final without playing full-time on the BDO circuit.

During the first set of the match, Lewis became the first player to throw a nine-dart finish in a World Championship final. Lewis went on to win the match 7–5 and with it the championship, guaranteeing him a place in the 2011 Premier League. He had also risen to his highest ranking of No. 2. In addition, at 25 years old Lewis became the fifth youngest player to win a World Championship, behind Jelle Klaasen (21 in 2006), Eric Bristow (22 in 1980), Keith Deller (23 in 1983), and Mark Webster (24 in 2008), as well as the youngest ever PDC World Champion.

==== Rest of 2011 ====
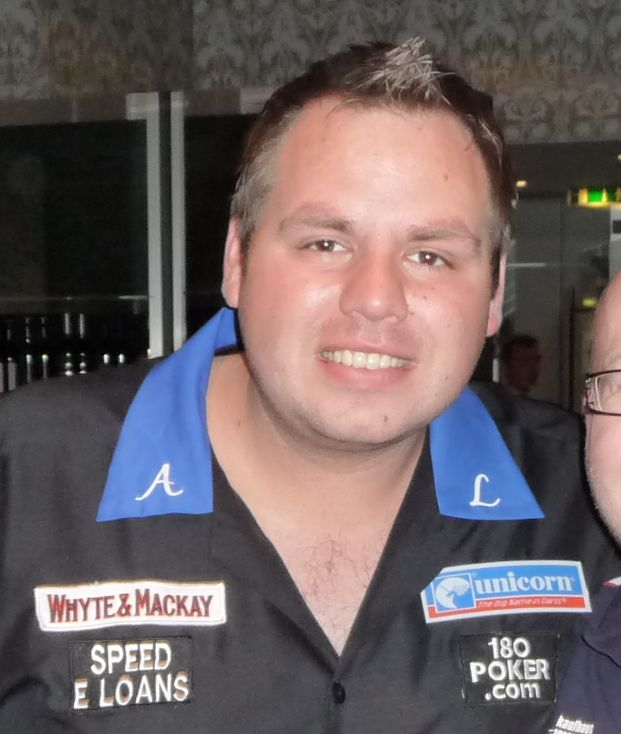
Lewis in 2011

In the 2011 Players Championship Finals Lewis lost 6–4 to Steve Beaton in the first round.

He got off to a winning start in the Premier League by beating the 2010 champion Phil Taylor 8–2, only to lose to Taylor 8–3 in their second meeting. Week 4 saw him get his first heavy defeat of the 2011 campaign, losing 8–2 to Mark Webster. He went on to defeat Gary Anderson in Anderson's home country of Scotland after both players were distracted by the crowd. Lewis was being booed and coins were thrown at him but he went on to win the match 8–3 and both players stated their disappointment with the crowd. During his walk on he had beer thrown over him. Lewis proceeded to make it to the final of the 2011 Premier League but lost 10–4 to Gary Anderson after beating Phil Taylor 8–3 in the semi-final in the same night.

Lewis was eliminated in the third round of the 2011 U.K. Open by Terry Jenkins, who took a 9–7 match. He lost 17–10 in the semi-finals of the 2011 World Matchplay to James Wade. He hit another perfect 9 dart leg on 31 July 2011 at the European Darts Championships against Raymond van Barneveld during their semi- final match which he won 11–10. He played Phil Taylor in the final and lost 8–11.

In the 2011 World Grand Prix, he played John Part in his first round match. He lost 2 sets to 1 after leading 1–0 in sets and 2–0 in legs.

He reached the final of the first players championship in Derby and was defeated 6–2 by Jamie Caven. In the Crawley Players Championship he was defeated in the final by Paul Nicholson 6–4 in a hard fought match, he had defeated Ronnie Baxter 6–5 in the semi-final.

Lewis was now under the management of former World Champion Keith Deller and under his guidance he has appeared in several major finals, including his World Championship win.

=== 2012 season ===
==== Defending his title ====
Lewis became the third player, after Eric Bristow and Raymond van Barneveld, to successfully defend their first World Championship title in the 2012 PDC World Championship, by beating Andy Hamilton 7–3 in the Final.

He almost exited the tournament on multiple occasions, beginning with his first round match against Nigel Heydon. He trailed 0–2 and was stung by a wasp during a break on his non-throwing hand, but nevertheless managed to claw his way back to 2–2. Heydon led 2–1 in the deciding set, but never had a dart for the match as Lewis won four of the last five legs to avoid an early exit. More comfortable victories ensued over Robert Thornton (4–2) and Wayne Jones (4–0), with Lewis seemingly heading for the semi-finals as he led Terry Jenkins 3–0 in the last 8, having only lost 2 legs. However, his opponent stormed back to level the match, before Lewis rediscovered his form to win the last two sets and clinch a 5–3 win. He said after the match that he had "lost his way" during Jenkins' fightback, but was delighted to be in the semi-finals.

His semi-final match with James Wade was hailed as one of the greatest comebacks of all time. Lewis trailed both 2–0 and 5–1, only to win the next 5 sets, including 10 straight legs, to incredibly win 6–5 and finished with a 161 checkout. After the semi-final Lewis stated: "That was the best win of my career, definitely".

The match eventually finished at 12:50am (GMT). However, Lewis managed to never trail against Hamilton and was a double 12 away from hitting a nine-darter in the final for the second successive year. Lewis clinched victory with his third attempt at the match winning double and said afterwards he believed he could win 10 World Championship titles. The tournament victory took Lewis' career prize money above the £1 million mark, and confirmed his number two status in the PDC Order of Merit. His semi-final comeback was named PDC Televised Performance of the Year at the PDC annual awards ceremony on 3 January.

==== Rest of 2012 ====
Lewis maintained his form for his next tournament of the season as he represented England and won the 2012 PDC World Cup of Darts, with Phil Taylor. The pair needed a sudden-death leg to see off Canada in the second round, before defeating the United States and Wales to reach the final where they played the Australian team consisting of Simon Whitlock and Paul Nicholson. The final finished with the scores at 3–3 meaning that a sudden-death leg was required to decide the title. Australia missed four darts to take the crown and England two, before Lewis took out double 5 to win his first World Cup, stating that the victory meant more to him than his second world title won a month earlier.

Lewis was an automatic entrant for the Premier League due to his Order of Merit ranking. His first game was against Taylor, just four days after their World Cup win. Lewis led the match 6–1, before Taylor came back to draw 7–7. Taylor averaged 112.79 which was until 2015 the highest televised average in a match without actually winning it. Lewis drew his next two matches before succumbing to a heavy 1–8 defeat to Gary Anderson. He had to wait until the 7th game of the season for his first win which came with an 8–3 defeat of Kevin Painter. Lewis went into the final match knowing a victory over Simon Whitlock would guarantee him a place in the play-offs, however he lost 6–8 to finish the season 6th in the table.

Lewis lost in the last 32 of the UK Open 7–9 to Wes Newton, and in the final of the seventh Players Tour Championship of the season, 3–6 to Ronnie Baxter. Lewis entered the World Matchplay knowing that if he could progress further than Phil Taylor he would move to world number one for the first time. He began with a 10–0 whitewash of Robert Thornton and a 13–7 victory over Andy Smith, but was then beaten 12–16 by Terry Jenkins in the quarter-finals to remain second in the world. In September, Lewis won his first individual title since his World Championship win at the fourth European Tour event, the German Darts Masters in Stuttgart. He dropped just three legs in his first three games before beating Tony West 6–3 in the quarter-finals and James Wade 6–1 in the semis to face occasional practice partner Ian White in the final. Lewis won 6–3 to claim his first European Tour title. After losing his opening two games of the Grand Slam of Darts to Tony O'Shea and John Part, Lewis failed to qualify from his group for the fourth time in the six stagings of the tournament. After all 33 ProTour events of 2012 had been played, Lewis finished 11th on the Order of Merit to qualify for the Players Championship Finals. Lewis had spent 24 hours with his wife Sarah as she went into labour, before travelling to the tournament in Minehead to face Richie Burnett. With Lewis leading 5–3, the pair were involved in a heated argument on stage as Burnett accused him of clicking his darts while he was throwing. Lewis took out 116 in the next leg to take the match, before returning to Stoke where Sarah gave birth to a boy in the early hours of the morning. Lewis once again returned to Minehead to face Taylor on only five hours sleep in 48 hours and lost 7–10.

=== 2013 season ===
Lewis finally relinquished his World Championship crown in the 2013 edition of the event. Despite not being at his best he comfortably made it through to the quarter-finals as he stretched his unbeaten run in the tournament to 15 games. There he faced Michael van Gerwen and what resulted was one of the greatest matches ever played in the tournament. Both players averaged over 100 as Lewis came from a set down four times to level the tie at 4–4. In the deciding set Lewis needed 60 to win but missed two darts at double top, later explaining that he had blocked the bed with his first dart. Van Gerwen stepped in to win three successive legs and end Lewis' hopes of a hat-trick of consecutive world titles.

Lewis retained his World Cup of Darts crown with Phil Taylor in February. They survived two match darts from South Africa in the last 16 and one from Wales in the semi-finals to play the Belgian brothers Ronny and Kim Huybrechts in the final. Lewis lost to Kim 0–4, but beat Ronny 4–2 meaning Taylor could secure the title by defeating Kim and he did so 4–1. Lewis lost his first four games of the 2013 Premier League, but in week five he beat Michael van Gerwen 7–4 to record his first win. He narrowly avoided relegation after week nine, and could only pick up a total of four wins from his 16 games to finish 8th in the table. Lewis reached the quarter-finals of the UK Open for only the second time in his career, but lost 6–10 to Peter Wright.

Lewis won his third major title at the European Championship, his first that wasn't a World Championship. He beat Mensur Suljović in the first round then averaged over 100 in his last four matches, including victory over Michael van Gerwen in the semi-finals, maintaining his high standard for 63 successive legs, which culminated in an 11–6 victory over Simon Whitlock in the final. Lewis beat Ronny Huybrechts, Brendan Dolan and Andy Hamilton at the World Matchplay to once again face van Gerwen in the semi-finals of a major event. The match was played at a frenetic pace as the 32 legs took 52 minutes, with Lewis hitting 16 180's and fighting back from 14–15 down to win 17–15. In his first Matchplay final Lewis played Phil Taylor and averaged 105.92 and hit 19 maximums, but Taylor averaged 111.23 to take the match 18–13. In October, Lewis won his first Pro Tour title in over a year at the ninth Players Championship as he came from 3–0 down in the final to beat Brendan Dolan 6–4. Lewis almost pulled out of the inaugural Masters tournament due to a bout of flu before edging past Kim Huybrechts in the first round 6–5 and then thrashing home favourite Robert Thornton 8–2. His semi-final match with Raymond van Barneveld was the best of the event as he took out a 116 finish in the final leg to break throw and win 10–9. However, he only had 15 minutes to prepare for the final against Taylor and, although he averaged 108, he was 5–0 down at the first break. Lewis claimed his first leg of the final to trail 9–1 but the match was over in the next. Lewis overcame Van Gerwen and Kim Huybrechts in the last 16 and quarter-finals of the Grand Slam of Darts to meet Taylor in the semi-finals. What followed was the highest quality darts match ever played as Lewis averaged 110.99 over 25 legs to Taylor's 109.76 in a 16–9 defeat, the highest combined average ever recorded. Lewis was 8–7 up but missed darts at doubles to lose eight successive legs including one where both players had left 160 with Lewis wiring the double top only for Taylor to step in and take it out. The match broke the PDC record for 180's with 32, beating the old record set in the 2007 World Championship final where 31 were made in 32 more legs than this match.

=== 2014 season ===
Lewis was untroubled in winning through to the semi-finals of the 2014 World Championship as none of his opponents could take more than a single set off him. He then scored similar to his opponent Michael van Gerwen, but hit only 28% of his doubles to suffer a heavy 6–0 loss. Lewis reached the finals of the first and third UK Open Qualifiers but was defeated 6–2 by Andy Hamilton and Phil Taylor respectively.

At the UK Open, he began his campaign with a 9–5 win over Ronnie Baxter in the third round, before recovering from 7–3 down to Ronny Huybrechts to progress 9–8. More comfortable wins over Raymond van Barneveld (9–2) and Mensur Suljović (10–3) followed before Lewis beat Mervyn King 10–6 to play Terry Jenkins in the final. Lewis thrashed him 11–1 with an average of 109.13 for his first UK Open title and a fourth major win. He had a strong start to the Premier League with 7–1 and 7–3 victories over Simon Whitlock and Phil Taylor in the opening two matches and was still in the top four after nine weeks of play. However, Lewis then lost four games in a row and went on to finish sixth in the table, to miss out on the play-offs. Lewis and Taylor could not complete a hat-trick of successive World Cup of Darts titles as they met the Netherlands in the final with Taylor losing 4–0 to Van Gerwen and Lewis being beaten 4–0 by Van Barneveld and 4–2 by Van Gerwen meaning the tie was over before Taylor's second singles match.

Lewis was beaten 16–8 by Gary Anderson in the quarter-finals of the World Matchplay. From 2–0 up in sets in the second round of the World Grand Prix he lost 3–2 to Kevin Painter and suffered a 6–4 defeat to Jelle Klaasen in the first round of the European Championship. Lewis' season seemed to be fading dramatically when he lost to youngsters Rowby-John Rodriguez and Keegan Brown at the Grand Slam of Darts which meant he had been eliminated from the competition before his final group game, but he returned to form at the Players Championship Finals. Jamie Caven had one dart at the bull to defeat Lewis in the quarter-finals but missed and Lewis checked out 124 and 123 in successive legs to win 10–9 and then enjoyed a more comfortable 11–6 victory against Wes Newton to play Anderson in the final in an attempt to win more than one major in the same season for the first time. However, from holding a slender 4–3 lead, Lewis lost five successive legs and was defeated 11–6.

=== 2015 season ===
Lewis threw a nine-dart finish to win the opening set of his third round tie against Raymond van Barneveld at the 2015 World Championship. He went a set ahead three times but van Barneveld levelled on each occasion, with Lewis missing one match dart in the sixth set. Lewis lost his form in the deciding set to be defeated 4–3 failing to reach the quarter-final stage of the event for the first time since 2009. On the opening night of the Premier League, Lewis set his highest televised average of 113.80 in beating van Barneveld 7–1. A day later he claimed the first UK Open Qualifier by beating van Gerwen 6–1 and said afterwards that his play signalled his intent for the year ahead. He lost 6–5 in the final of the fifth event to Michael Smith. Lewis' UK Open reign ended when he was beaten 9–3 by Raymond van Barneveld in the third round. He took the third Players Championship with a 6–3 win over Robert Thornton in the final and lost 6–1 to Van Gerwen in the final of the next event. A 6–5 victory over Brendan Dolan saw Lewis claim the fifth event and he lost 6–3 to Keegan Brown in the final of the eighth. Despite his good start to the Premier League, Lewis could not win another match until the ninth week, which saved him from relegation by a point. Lewis would ultimately finish sixth in the table with five wins from his 16 games, which resulted in him missing the play-offs for the fourth year in a row. Lewis and Taylor advanced to the final of the World Cup and their match against the Scottish pairing of Gary Anderson and Peter Wright went to the final singles game in which Lewis beat Wright 4–1 to seal England's third title in the event. He suffered a surprise 13–10 loss to Gerwyn Price in the second round of the World Matchplay and was thrashed 11–3 by Taylor in the final of the Sydney Darts Masters. However, Lewis atoned for this soon afterwards by claiming his first World Series of Darts title at the Auckland Darts Masters as Van Barneveld missed five match darts in the final leg to allow Lewis to edge it 11–10. Lewis failed to get past the second round of the World Grand Prix for the fifth year in a row as he lost 3–0 to Mark Webster.

Lewis held on from 9–6 ahead of Taylor at the European Championship to edge through 10–9, but was then defeated 11–5 in the semi-finals by Gary Anderson. He also lost in the quarter-finals of the Grand Slam 16–11 against Michael Smith. An 11–1 thrashing of Mensur Suljović at the Players Championship Finals helped Lewis play in his only major final this year, but averaged 89.17 as van Gerwen saw him off 11–6.

=== 2016 season ===
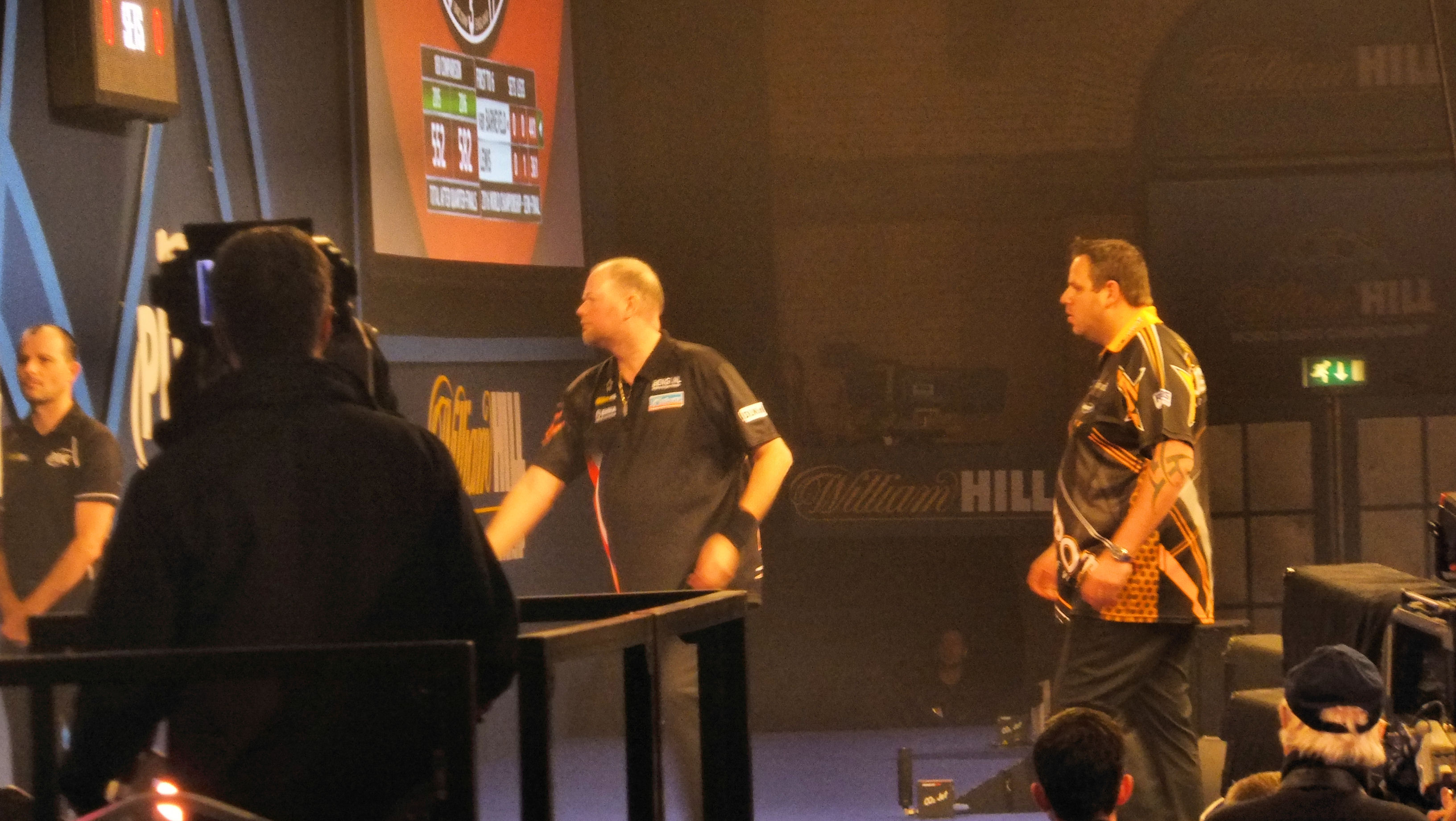
Lewis (right) in a match against Raymond van Barneveld

A trio of matches without dropping a set saw Lewis cruise in to the quarter-finals of the 2016 World Championship and he then overcame Peter Wright 5–2 and was 5–0 up on Raymond van Barneveld in the semis. The Dutchman threatened a comeback as he reduced the gap to 5–3, but Lewis captured the set he needed to reach his third World Championship final. In a rematch of the 2011 final he faced Gary Anderson and Lewis lost 7–5, a reversal of the scoreline from five years ago. 34 180s were thrown which was a then-record in a professional match. He won the first UK Open Qualifier with a 6–2 victory over Phil Taylor with an average of 110 and was knocked out in the fifth round of the UK Open itself, 9–7 by Jelle Klaasen. Lewis ended Michael van Gerwen's 27 match wins in a row when he knocked out him 6–4 in the quarter-finals of the first Players Championship event of the year. He then overcame Gary Anderson 6–3 and was 5–3 ahead of Peter Wright in the final, but lost 6–5 without getting a dart for the match. Lewis advanced to the Premier League Play-offs for the first time in five years, which included a nine darter against James Wade in week 11, but he was easily defeated 10–4 by Van Gerwen.

Lewis and Taylor won their fourth World Cup crown by overcoming the Netherlands in the final, with Lewis beating Van Gerwen 4–1 in the deciding match. Anderson inflicted an 11–7 defeat on Lewis in the final of the Auckland Darts Masters and he lost 17–9 to Van Gerwen in semi-finals of the World Matchplay. After the match Van Gerwen accused Lewis of trying to slow his game down because he was scared of him. Lewis said he was happy to reach the last four of such an event whilst playing his D-game. His poor form at the World Grand Prix continued as Raymond van Barneveld knocked him out 3–0 in the second round and he also finished bottom of his group at the Grand Slam.

=== 2017 ===
There was never more than a set between Lewis and Raymond van Barneveld in the third round of the 2017 World Championship, with Lewis narrowly losing 4–3. He was beaten 6–4 by Peter Wright in the final of the first UK Open Qualifier of the year and won the fifth Players Championship with a 6–3 victory over Dave Chisnall. He threw a nine-darter in week 11 of the Premier League whilst defeating Van Barneveld 7–4 with an average of 111.52. Lewis played with Chisnall at the World Cup for the first time and they were knocked out in the semi-finals after failing to win either of their matches against the Dutch pair of Michael van Gerwen and Van Barneveld.

=== 2018–2026 ===
In the 2018 World Championship, Kevin Münch caused a major upset by defeating Lewis, who had never before been beaten in the first round of a World Championship, in the first round 3–1 in sets. The defeat saw Lewis fall to #20 in the Order of Merit and miss the Premier League and the Masters for the first time.

On 2 February 2018 the Darts Regulation Authority ("DRA") released a statement that Lewis would be suspended with immediate effect pending an appeal following an incident with José Justicia in the first UK Open qualifier.

On 8 February 2018 Lewis was given a three-month ban suspended for six months after Lewis admitted he broke DRA rules.

Lewis lost 4–1 to Michael van Gerwen in the fourth round of the 2019 World Championship. At the Grand Slam of Darts he beat James Wade 10–9 in the last 16 to reach the quarter-finals, before once again losing to van Gerwen.

In the 2020 World Championship Lewis lost 4–3 in the fourth round to Dimitri Van den Bergh despite at one point leading 3–1 in sets. In October, Lewis tested positive for COVID-19 and was forced to withdraw from the 2020 World Grand Prix.

Lewis began his 2021 season with a shock 3–1 loss to Danny Baggish in the second round of the 2021 World Championship.

At the Players Championship Finals he lost in the second round to Peter Wright, in a match mired in controversy after an altercation on stage after the match.

At the 2022 World Championship, Lewis lost 3–1 in the second round to Gary Anderson.

Lewis returned to the winners circle with his first title in 3 years by winning Players Championship 20. At the 2022 World Grand Prix, Lewis beat José de Sousa in the first round before losing to Chris Dobey.

In the 2023 World Championship, Lewis lost 3–0 against Damon Heta, falling at the second round stage for the third year in succession.

In April 2023, following withdrawals from multiple PDC Pro Tour events, Lewis announced he was taking a break from competing.

In July 2024 it was announced Lewis would be partnering with MODUS Sports Management effective immediately and that Lewis will play on the MODUS Super Series in 2025.

Lewis did not attend the PDPA's 2024/25 PDC World Championship TCH Qualifier.

On 28 August 2025 Lewis made his return to competitive darts in the MODUS Super Series International Pairs tournament alongside former BDO World Champion Steve Beaton representing England.

In September 2026 it was announced that Lewis would compete in November's MODUS Super Series International Pairs tournament alongside his former England pairs partner Phil Taylor.

== Controversies ==
Lewis has been involved in several controversial matches during his career, including his debut World Championship in 2006. During his quarter-final with Peter Manley he left the stage part-way through the match as he alleged Manley had been trying to upset him while he was throwing.

In April 2008, he argued with Kevin Painter during their quarter final match at the Holland Masters. This resulted in a six-month ban for Lewis, (with four months of this ban suspended) and a fine of £400.

At the 2009 World Grand Prix Lewis was playing Gary Anderson in the second round and during the first set the two players exchanged words after Anderson felt Lewis went into the exclusion zone while Anderson was throwing. Lewis won the match 3–2.

During the 2012 PDC World Darts Championship semi-final, both Lewis and his opponent James Wade left the stage with Lewis trailing 2–0 in sets, after complaining of a 'draught' blowing across the stage. The 25-minute break seemed to provoke the crowd into heckling Lewis for the remainder of the game, Lewis went on to win the match 6–5.

In February 2018, Lewis was suspended by the PDC after an altercation following his win over José Justicia at the 2018 UK Open Qualifier 1. Six days later Lewis issued a statement apologising for his actions and announced that he had been fined £3,000 and given a 3-month suspended ban.

== Ranking and earnings ==
On the PDC Order of Merit – the PDC's world ranking system, Lewis has been ranked at a career high of second after beating Gary Anderson to win his first World Championship final. He has won more than £3,300,000 in prize money during his career.

== Personal life ==
Adrian Lewis' signature

In August 2009, Lewis had his first child with then-girlfriend Katie-Adele Hughes. Lewis and Hughes broke up in January 2011, four days after he won his first world title. On 6 August 2012, he married Sarah Podmore (born 1987), who has three children from her previous marriage. In December 2012, she gave birth to their son. They have two further children, born in June 2015 and August 2017. In 2015, Sarah was diagnosed with medullary sponge kidney. One of Lewis's daughters has an autism-related disability and ADHD and requires constant care. The health issues faced by his wife and daughter contributed to his decision to step away from darts in 2023.

Lewis supports his local football team Stoke City.

In 2012, Lewis, together with the other seven players who competed in the Premier League recorded a charity single with Chas Hodges and his band called 'Got My Tickets for the Darts' which was written by Chas. It was released on 18 May, the night after the play-offs at the O2 in London, where it was premiered. Proceeds from the single were donated to the Haven House Children's Hospice.

== World Championship results ==
=== PDC ===
- 2006: Quarter-finals (lost to Peter Manley 3–5)
- 2007: Third round (lost to Andy Jenkins 3–4)
- 2008: Quarter-finals (lost to Kevin Painter 2–5)
- 2009: Second round (lost to Paul Nicholson 3–4)
- 2010: Quarter-finals (lost to Phil Taylor 0–5)
- 2011: Winner (beat Gary Anderson 7–5)
- 2012: Winner (beat Andy Hamilton 7–3)
- 2013: Quarter-finals (lost to Michael van Gerwen 4–5)
- 2014: Semi-finals (lost to Michael van Gerwen 0–6)
- 2015: Third round (lost to Raymond van Barneveld 3–4)
- 2016: Runner-up (lost to Gary Anderson 5–7)
- 2017: Third round (lost to Raymond van Barneveld 3–4)
- 2018: First round (lost to Kevin Münch 1–3)
- 2019: Fourth round (lost to Michael van Gerwen 1–4)
- 2020: Fourth round (lost to Dimitri Van den Bergh 3–4)
- 2021: Second round (lost to Danny Baggish 1–3)
- 2022: Second round (lost to Gary Anderson 1–3)
- 2023: Second round (lost to Damon Heta 0–3)

== Career finals ==
=== PDC major finals: 14 (4 titles) ===
Legend
World Championship (2–1)
World Matchplay (0–1)
World Grand Prix (0–1)
Premier League (0–1)
UK Open (1–0)
Masters (0–1)
Players Championship Finals (0–2)
European Championship (1–2)
US Open / World Series of Darts (0–1)

Outcome	No.	Year	Championship	Opponent in the final	Score (Note: (l) = score in legs, (s) = score in sets, (m) = score in matches.)
Runner-up	1.	2006	World Series of Darts	Phil Taylor	5–13 (l)
Runner-up	2.	2008	European Championship	Phil Taylor	5–11 (l)
Runner-up	3.	2010	World Grand Prix	James Wade	3–6 (s)
Winner	1.	2011	World Championship	Gary Anderson	7–5 (s)
Runner-up	4.	2011	Premier League	Gary Anderson	4–10 (l)
Runner-up	5.	2011	European Championship (2)	Phil Taylor	8–11 (l)
Winner	2.	2012	World Championship (2)	Andy Hamilton	7–3 (s)
Winner	3.	2013	European Championship	Simon Whitlock	11–6 (l)
Runner-up	6.	2013	World Matchplay	Phil Taylor	13–18 (l)
Runner-up	7.	2013	Masters	Phil Taylor	1–10 (l)
Winner	4.	2014	UK Open	Terry Jenkins	11–1 (l)
Runner-up	8.	2014	Players Championship Finals	Gary Anderson	6–11 (l)
Runner-up	9.	2015	Players Championship Finals (2)	Michael van Gerwen	6–11 (l)
Runner-up	10.	2016	World Championship	Gary Anderson	5–7 (s)

=== PDC world series finals: 3 (1 title) ===
Legend
World Series of Darts (1–2)

Outcome	No.	Year	Championship	Opponent in the final	Score
Runner-up	1.	2015	Sydney Darts Masters	Phil Taylor	3–11 (l)
Winner	1.	2015	Auckland Darts Masters	Raymond van Barneveld	11–10 (l)
Runner-up	2.	2016	Auckland Darts Masters	Gary Anderson	7–11 (l)

=== PDC team finals: 5 (4 titles) ===
Outcome	No.	Year	Championship	Team	Teammate	Opponents in the final	Score
Winner	1.	2012	World Cup of Darts	England	Phil Taylor	Australia – Simon Whitlock and Paul Nicholson	4–3 (m)
Winner	2.	2013	World Cup of Darts (2)	England	Phil Taylor	Belgium – Kim Huybrechts and Ronny Huybrechts	3–1 (m)
Runner-up	1.	2014	World Cup of Darts	England	Phil Taylor	Netherlands – Michael van Gerwen and Raymond van Barneveld	0–3 (m)
Winner	3.	2015	World Cup of Darts (3)	England	Phil Taylor	Scotland – Gary Anderson and Peter Wright	3–2 (m)
Winner	4.	2016	World Cup of Darts (4)	England	Phil Taylor	Netherlands – Michael van Gerwen and Raymond van Barneveld	3–2 (m)

== Nine-dart finishes ==
Adrian Lewis televised nine-dart finishes
Date	Opponent	Tournament	Method	Prize
3 January 2011	(Scotland) Gary Anderson	PDC World Championship	3 x T20; 3 x T20; T20, T19, D12	£10,000
31 July 2011	(Netherlands) Raymond van Barneveld	European Championship	3 x T20; 3 x T20; T20, T19, D12	
30 December 2014	(Netherlands) Raymond van Barneveld	PDC World Championship	3 x T20; 3 x T20; T20, T19, D12	£10,000
14 April 2016	(England) James Wade	Premier League	3 x T20; 2 x T20, T19; 2 x T20, D12	
13 April 2017	(Netherlands) Raymond van Barneveld	Premier League	3 x T20; 3 x T20; T20, T19, D12	

== High averages ==
Adrian Lewis televised high averages
Average	Date	Opponent	Tournament	Stage	Score	Ref.
113.80	5 February 2015	(Netherlands) Raymond van Barneveld	2015 Premier League	Round 1	7–1 (l)	

== Performance timeline ==
Tournament	2004	2005	2006	2007	2008	2009	2010	2011	2012	2013	2014	2015	2016	2017	2018	2019	2020	2021	2022	2023
PDC Ranked televised events
World Championship	DNQ		QF	3R	QF	2R	QF	W	W	QF	SF	3R	F	3R	1R	4R	4R	2R	2R	2R
UK Open	3R	6R	5R	5R	4R	4R	QF	3R	4R	QF	W	3R	5R	4R	3R	4R	4R	4R	4R	5R
World Matchplay	DNQ	QF	2R	SF	1R	QF	1R	SF	QF	F	QF	2R	SF	SF	2R	1R	QF	DNQ	1R	DNQ
World Grand Prix	2R	DNQ	2R	QF	2R	QF	F	1R	2R	2R	2R	2R	2R	1R	2R	1R	WD	DNQ	2R	DNQ
European Championship	Not held				F	1R	1R	F	1R	W	1R	SF	DNQ		1R	1R	DNQ			
Grand Slam	Not held			2R	RR	RR	RR	SF	RR	SF	RR	QF	RR	DNQ		QF	DNQ			
Players Championship Finals	Not held					1R	QF	1R	2R	2R	F	F	2R	3R	2R	2R	1R	2R	1R	DNQ
PDC Non-ranked televised events
Premier League	NH	DNP		7th	SF	DNP	7th	F	6th	8th	6th	6th	SF	8th	DNP					
Masters	Not held									F	QF	SF	1R	SF	DNQ	1R	QF	QF	DNQ	
World Cup	Not held						DNQ	NH	W	W	F	W	W	SF	DNQ					
World Series Finals	Not held											SF	QF	1R	DNQ					DNP
Past major events
Las Vegas Desert Classic	1R	1R	1R	QF	2R	QF	Not held													
International Darts League	DNP			SF	Not held															
Career statistics
Year-end ranking	50	18	6	7	6	9	5	2	2	5	3	4	4	20	16	13	24	39	34	52

PDC European Tour

Season	1	2	3	4	5	6	7	8	9	10	11	12	13
2012	ADO; WD	GDC; 1R	EDO; 2R	GDM; W	DDM; DNP								
2013	UKM; SF	EDT; DNP	EDO; 3R	ADO; WD	GDT; SF	GDC; 1R	GDM; 2R	DDM; 2R					
2014	GDC; 3R	DDM; 3R	GDM; SF	ADO; DNP	GDT; QF	EDO; 3R	EDG; QF	EDT; DNP					
2015	GDC; SF	GDT; DNP	GDM; SF	DNP			EDT; 3R	EDM; DNP	EDG; DNP				
2016	DDM; QF	GDM; 3R	GDT; WD	EDM; 3R	DNP								
2017	GDC; DNP	GDM; 1R	GDO; DNP	EDG; 3R	GDT; WD	EDM; 1R	ADO; WD	EDO; WD	DNP			EDT; DNQ	
2018	EDO; 2R	GDG; 1R	GDO; DNQ	ADO; DNQ	EDG; WD	DDM; 1R	GDT; F	DDO; SF	EDM; DNQ	GDC; QF	DDC; QF	IDO; QF	EDT; DNP
2019	EDO; 2R	GDC; SF	GDG; 2R	GDO; QF	ADO; QF	EDG; 2R	DDM; DNP	DDO; 3R	CDO; 2R	ADC; 3R	EDM; 3R	IDO; QF	GDT; DNP
2020	BDC; DNP	GDC; 2R	EDG; DNP	IDO; 2R									
2021	HDT; 1R	GDT; DNQ											
2022	IDO; DNQ	GDC; 1R	GDG; DNQ	ADO; WD	EDO; DNQ	CDO; 3R	EDG; 2R	DNQ			GDO; WD	BDO; QF	GDT; DNQ
2023	BSD; 1R	EDO; DNQ	IDO; WD	DNQ			DNP						

PDC Players Championships

Season	1	2	3	4	5	6	7	8	9	10	11	12	13	14	15	16	17	18	19	20	21	22	23	24	25	26	27	28	29	30
2012	ALI; DNP		REA; 3R	REA; 1R	CRA; DNP		BIR; F	BIR; 3R	CRA; SF	CRA; 2R	BAR; DNP		DUB; 2R	DUB; 4R	KIL; DNP		CRA; 3R	CRA; 4R	BAR; 1R	BAR; SF										
2013	WIG; 2R	WIG; 3R	WIG; DNP		CRA; 4R	CRA; 1R	BAR; 4R	BAR; 3R	DUB; W	DUB; 3R	DNP				BAR; 2R	BAR; DNP														
2014	BAR; QF	BAR; 3R	CRA; QF	CRA; QF	WIG; DNP		WIG; 4R	WIG; DNP	CRA; 4R	CRA; 3R	COV; 1R	COV; 4R	CRA; SF	CRA; SF	DUB; SF	DUB; 1R	CRA; DNP		COV; QF	COV; 3R										
2015	BAR; QF	BAR; 2R	BAR; W	BAR; F	BAR; W	COV; 2R	COV; 3R	COV; F	CRA; DNP		BAR; 4R	BAR; 4R	WIG; 1R	WIG; 4R	BAR; 1R	BAR; DNP	DUB; 3R	DUB; 2R	COV; QF	COV; 4R										
2016	BAR; F	BAR; 4R	BAR; 2R	BAR; 1R	Did not participate									BAR; 4R	BAR; 2R	BAR; DNP	DUB; 1R	DUB; QF	BAR; SF	BAR; 4R										
2017	BAR; 3R	BAR; 1R	BAR; DNP		MIL; W	MIL; 1R	BAR; 2R	BAR; 3R	WIG; QF	WIG; 4R	MIL; 1R	MIL; 2R	Did not participate						DUB; 2R	DUB; 3R	BAR; F	BAR; 4R								
2018	BAR; 3R	BAR; QF	BAR; 1R	BAR; SF	MIL; 3R	MIL; 2R	BAR; F	BAR; F	WIG; QF	WIG; 4R	MIL; QF	MIL; 1R	WIG; 1R	WIG; 2R	BAR; 3R	BAR; SF	BAR; 1R	BAR; 4R	DUB; QF	DUB; 4R	BAR; 3R	BAR; F								
2019	WIG; DNP		WIG; 3R	WIG; 4R	BAR; 2R	BAR; QF	WIG; 2R	WIG; W	BAR; QF	BAR; 3R	BAR; 1R	BAR; 1R	BAR; SF	BAR; 3R	BAR; 1R	BAR; 2R	WIG; 3R	WIG; 1R	BAR; 1R	BAR; SF	HIL; DNP		BAR; SF	BAR; 2R	BAR; 3R	BAR; 1R	DUB; 2R	DUB; 1R	BAR; 3R	BAR; 1R
2020	BAR; SF	BAR; 3R	WIG; 4R	WIG; 4R	WIG; 2R	WIG; 4R	BAR; DNP		MIL; 1R	MIL; 3R	MIL; 1R	MIL; 1R	MIL; DNP	NIE; 1R	NIE; 1R	NIE; 1R	NIE; 2R	NIE; 1R	COV; 1R	COV; 2R	COV; 1R	COV; SF	COV; QF							
2021	BOL; 1R	BOL; 2R	BOL; 2R	BOL; 2R	MIL; 3R	MIL; 1R	MIL; 1R	MIL; 1R	NIE; DNP				MIL; 4R	MIL; 3R	MIL; QF	MIL; QF	COV; 3R	COV; 2R	COV; 3R	COV; 3R	BAR; 1R	BAR; 3R	BAR; 2R	BAR; F	BAR; 3R	BAR; 1R	BAR; 1R	BAR; 2R	BAR; 1R	BAR; 3R
2022	BAR; 2R	BAR; 2R	WIG; 2R	WIG; 1R	BAR; 3R	BAR; 4R	NIE; 3R	NIE; SF	BAR; 3R	BAR; QF	BAR; 2R	BAR; 1R	BAR; 1R	WIG; 1R	WIG; 4R	NIE; DNP		BAR; SF	BAR; 2R	BAR; W	Did not participate					BAR; 1R	BAR; 1R	BAR; QF	BAR; 2R	BAR; 1R
2023	BAR; 1R	BAR; 1R	BAR; 1R	BAR; 3R	BAR; 1R	BAR; 1R	Did not participate																							

Performance Table Legend
W	Won the tournament	F	Finalist	SF	Semifinalist	QF	Quarterfinalist	#R; RR; Prel.	Lost in # round Round-robin; Preliminary round	DQ	Disqualified
DNQ	Did not qualify	DNP	Did not participate	WD	Withdrew	NH	Tournament not held	#R; RR; Prel.	Lost in # round Round-robin; Preliminary round	NYF	Not yet founded
