= 2014 PDC Pro Tour =

Darts tournaments

The 2014 PDC Pro Tour was a series of non-televised darts tournaments organised by the Professional Darts Corporation (PDC). Professional Dart Players Association Players Championships, UK Open Qualifiers, and European Tour events are the events that make up the Pro Tour. This year there were 34 PDC Pro Tour events held – 20 Players Championships, 6 UK Open Qualifiers, and 8 European Tour events.

== Prize money ==
Prize money for each UK Open Qualifier was increased from £35,000 to £50,000 to match the 2013 Players Championships, which themselves remained unchanged for this year. European Tour events offered £100,000 per event, the same as in 2013.

Stage	ET	PC/UKQ	CT	YT
Winner	£20,000	£10,000	£2,000	£1,000
Runner-up	£8,000	£5,000	£1,000	£500
Semi-finalists	£4,000	£2,500	£500	£250
Quarter-finalists	£3,000	£1,500	£300	£150
Last 16	£2,000	£1,000	£200	£100
Last 32	£1,250	£500	£100	£50
Last 48	£1,000	N/A	N/A	N/A
Last 64	N/A	£250	£50	£25
Total	£100,000	£50,000	£10,000	£5,000

== PDC Pro Tour Card ==
128 players were granted Tour Cards, which enabled them to participate in all Players Championships, UK Open Qualifiers and European Tour events.

=== Tour Cards ===
The 2014 Tour Cards were awarded to:

- (63) The top 64 players from the PDC Order of Merit after the 2014 World Championship. (Netherlands) Co Stompé, (Finland) Jani Haavisto and (England) Steve Coote resigned their cards.
- (42) The 42 qualifiers from 2014 Q-School.
- (16) The 16 qualifiers from 2013 Q-School not ranked in the top 64 of the PDC Order of Merit following the World Championship.
- (1) Four semi-finalists of the 2014 BDO World Darts Championship, only (England) Stephen Bunting accepted his tour card.
- (1) The winner of the 2013 Scandinavian Order of Merit ( (Denmark) Per Laursen).
- (1) The winner of the 2012 Scandinavian Order of Merit ( (Finland) Jarkko Komula).
- (2) Two highest qualifiers from 2013 Challenge Tour ( (England) Ben Ward and (England) Adam Hunt).
- (2) Two highest qualifiers from 2012 Youth Tour ( (England) Chris Aubrey and (England) Josh Payne).

Lakeside Champion Stephen Bunting accepted his offer of a Tour Card, while a further 16 players won automatic Tour Cards at Qualifying School. To complete the field of 128 Tour Card Holders, places were allocated down the final Qualifying School Order of Merit, with 26 of the top 27 players taking a Tour Card.

=== Q School ===
The PDC Pro Tour Qualifying School took place at the Robin Park Tennis Centre in Wigan from January 15–18. The following players won two-year tour cards on each of the days played:

January 15	January 16	January 17	January 18
(Australia) Kyle Anderson (Netherlands) Benito van de Pas (Spain) Antonio Alcinas (England) Andrew Gilding	(Germany) Tomas Seyler (England) Andy Parsons (Wales) Gerwyn Price (England) Dave Bird	(Scotland) Gary Stone (England) Matt Padgett (Wales) Robert Owen (England) Tony Newell	(England) Steve West (England) Nigel Heydon (England) Joe Murnan (Scotland) Jason Hogg

A Q School Order of Merit was also created by using the following points system:

Stage	Points
Last 8	9
Last 16	5
Last 32	3
Last 64	2
Last 128	1

To complete the field of 128 Tour Card Holders, places were allocated down the final Qualifying School Order of Merit, with 26 of the top 27 players taking a Tour Card. Stuart Bousfield turned down his chance to take up a Tour Card from the rankings, and as such is removed from the standings for 2014.

1. (England) Brian Woods
2. (Austria) Zoran Lerchbacher
3. (England) Mick Todd
4. (England) Pete Dyos
5. (England) Keegan Brown
6. (England) Stuart White
7. (England) Steve Grubb
8. (England) Ian Moss
9. (Austria) Rowby-John Rodriguez
10. (Netherlands) Christian Kist
11. (Scotland) Jim Walker
12. (England) Dave Ladley
13. (Netherlands) Mareno Michels
14. (Scotland) Mark Barilli
15. (Scotland) Jamie Bain
16. (England) Michael Barnard
17. (England) Davey Dodds
18. (England) Steve Hine
19. (England) Terry Temple
20. (England) Ross Twell
21. (England) Stuart Anderson
22. (England) Conan Whitehead
23. (England) Mark Cox
24. (Republic of Ireland) William O'Connor
25. (England) ~~Stuart Bousfield~~
26. (Netherlands) Joey ten Berge
27. (Netherlands) Kevin Voornhout

== Players Championships ==
(All matches – best of 11 legs)

=== Players Championship 1 ===
Players Championship 1 was contested on 15 March 2014 at the Barnsley Metrodome. The tournament was won by Gary Anderson, who defeated Andrew Gilding 6–5 in the final.

Quarter-finals
32	(England) Darren Webster	2
Andrew Gilding	6
29	(England) James Wade	6
21	(England) Ronnie Baxter	5
15	(England) Andy Hamilton	3
7	(Scotland) Gary Anderson	6
14	(England) Adrian Lewis	4
11	(England) Mervyn King	6

Semi-finals
Andrew Gilding	6
29	(England) James Wade	3
7	Gary Anderson	6
11	(England) Mervyn King	3

Final
Andrew Gilding 107.70	5
7	Gary Anderson 111.47	6

=== Players Championship 2 ===
Players Championship 2 was contested on 16 March 2014 at the Barnsley Metrodome. The tournament was won by Michael van Gerwen, who defeated Dean Winstanley 6–1 in the final.

Quarter-finals
1	(Netherlands) Michael van Gerwen	6
24	(England) Michael Smith	4
(Netherlands) Christian Kist	2
5	(Belgium) Kim Huybrechts	6
2	(Scotland) Gary Anderson	5
(England) Dean Winstanley	6
30	(England) Darren Webster	1
22	Raymond van Barneveld	6

Semi-finals
1	(Netherlands) Michael van Gerwen	6
5	(Belgium) Kim Huybrechts	3
(England) Dean Winstanley	6
22	Raymond van Barneveld	4

Final
1	Michael van Gerwen 95.64	6
Dean Winstanley 94.95	1

=== Players Championship 3 ===
Players Championship 3 was contested on 22 March in Crawley. The tournament was won by Gary Anderson, who defeated Phil Taylor 6–5 in the final.

Quarter-finals
16	(England) Phil Taylor	6
25	(England) Terry Jenkins	4
20	(England) Ronnie Baxter	2
(England) Nigel Heydon	6
31	(England) James Wade	3
(Netherlands) Christian Kist	6
14	(England) Adrian Lewis	4
6	(Scotland) Gary Anderson	6

Semi-finals
16	(England) Phil Taylor	6
(England) Nigel Heydon	0
(Netherlands) Christian Kist	5
6	(Scotland) Gary Anderson	6

Final
16	(England) Phil Taylor 101.96	5
6	(Scotland) Gary Anderson 105.81	6

=== Players Championship 4 ===
Players Championship 4 was contested on 23 March in Crawley. The tournament was won by Phil Taylor, who whitewashed Ian White 6–0 in the final.

Quarter-finals
(Sweden) Magnus Caris	6
(England) Stephen Bunting	4
4	(England) Dave Chisnall	2
12	(England) Ian White	6
15	(England) Phil Taylor	6
23	(England) Michael Smith	1
14	(England) Adrian Lewis	3
11	(England) Mervyn King	6

Semi-finals
(Sweden) Magnus Caris	4
12	(England) Ian White	6
15	(England) Phil Taylor	6
11	(England) Mervyn King	2

Final
12	(England) Ian White 87.89	0
15	(England) Phil Taylor 104.86	6

=== Players Championship 5 ===
Players Championship 5 in Wigan on 12 April.

Quarter-finals
(England) James Hubbard	6
8	(England) Mervyn King	4
29	(England) Dean Winstanley	5
5	Brendan Dolan	6
2	Gary Anderson	6
26	(England) James Wade	2
19	Raymond van Barneveld	3
22	Michael Smith	6

Semi-finals
(England) James Hubbard	1
5	Brendan Dolan	6
2	Gary Anderson	4
22	Michael Smith	6

Final
5	Brendan Dolan 103.66	6
22	Michael Smith 87.43	0

=== Players Championship 6 ===
Players Championship 6 in Wigan on 13 April.

Quarter-finals
32	(Wales) Richie Burnett	5
9	Robert Thornton	6
20	Raymond van Barneveld	4
12	Phil Taylor	6
31	Vincent van der Voort	1
10	Ian White	6
(Australia) Kyle Anderson	6
22	(England) James Wade	3

Semi-finals
9	Robert Thornton	6
12	Phil Taylor	4
10	Ian White	6
(Australia) Kyle Anderson	1

Final
9	Robert Thornton 95.32	6
10	Ian White 96.38	5

=== Players Championship 7 ===
Players Championship 7 in Wigan on 3 May.

Quarter-finals
1	(Scotland) Gary Anderson	6
25	(Netherlands) Jelle Klaasen	1
4	(Belgium) Kim Huybrechts	5
5	Robert Thornton	6
(England) Keegan Brown	6
(England) Ben Ward	1
19	(England) Ronnie Baxter	5
6	(Scotland) Peter Wright	6

Semi-finals
1	(Scotland) Gary Anderson	3
5	Robert Thornton	6
(England) Keegan Brown	6
6	(Scotland) Peter Wright	5

Final
5	Robert Thornton 101.92	6
(England) Keegan Brown 88.27	5

=== Players Championship 8 ===
Players Championship 8 in Wigan on 4 May.

Quarter-finals
32	(England) Stephen Bunting	6
8	(England) Ian White	5
29	(England) Darren Webster	3
5	Robert Thornton	6
31	(England) Andrew Gilding	4
26	(England) Terry Jenkins	6
(Netherlands) Christian Kist	2
11	(Australia) Simon Whitlock	6

Semi-finals
32	(England) Stephen Bunting	2
5	Robert Thornton	6
26	(England) Terry Jenkins	6
11	(Australia) Simon Whitlock	1

Final
5	Robert Thornton 106.56	6
26	Terry Jenkins 105.85	4

=== Players Championship 9 ===
Players Championship 9 was contested on 24 May 2014 in Crawley. The tournament was won by Peter Wright who defeated Justin Pipe 6–2 in the final.

Quarter-finals		Semi-finals		Final
(Netherlands) Benito van de Pas	6
(England) Mervyn King	1	(Netherlands) Benito van de Pas	5
(England) Justin Pipe	6	(England) Justin Pipe	6
(Republic of Ireland) Connie Finnan	3			(England) Justin Pipe 85.36	2
(England) Jamie Caven	6			(Scotland) Peter Wright 94.82	6
(Scotland) Gary Anderson	4	(England) Jamie Caven	2
(Scotland) Peter Wright	6	(Scotland) Peter Wright	6
(Northern Ireland) Brendan Dolan	4

=== Players Championship 10 ===
Players Championship 10 was contested on 25 May 2014 in Crawley. The tournament was won by Terry Jenkins, who defeated Stephen Bunting 6–3 in the final.

Quarter-finals		Semi-finals		Final
(England) Stephen Bunting	6
(England) Darren Webster	5	(England) Stephen Bunting	6
(England) Justin Pipe	6	(England) Justin Pipe	4
(England) Ronnie Baxter	5			(England) Stephen Bunting 94.48	3
(England) Andy Hamilton	6			(England) Terry Jenkins 92.60	6
(England) Tony Newell	2	(England) Andy Hamilton	5
(England) Terry Jenkins	6	(England) Terry Jenkins	6
(England) Dean Winstanley	1

=== Players Championship 11 ===
Players Championship 11 in Coventry on 14 June.

Quarter-finals		Semi-finals		Final
(Belgium) Ronny Huybrechts	6
(England) Dean Winstanley	5	(Belgium) Ronny Huybrechts	4
(Scotland) Robert Thornton	6	(Scotland) Robert Thornton	6
(England) Ronnie Baxter	2			(Scotland) Robert Thornton 92.79	2
(Scotland) Gary Anderson	6			(Scotland) Gary Anderson 100.97	6
(England) Terry Temple	0	(Scotland) Gary Anderson	6
(England) Joe Cullen	6	(England) Joe Cullen	3
(Netherlands) Benito van de Pas	3

=== Players Championship 12 ===
Players Championship 12 in Coventry on 15 June.

Quarter-finals		Semi-finals		Final
(Netherlands) Michael van Gerwen	6
(England) Stuart Kellett	1	(Netherlands) Michael van Gerwen	4
(England) James Wade	6	(England) James Wade	6
(England) Dave Chisnall	5			(England) James Wade 88.82	3
(Australia) Simon Whitlock	6			(Australia) Simon Whitlock 99.27	6
(England) Ian White	5	(Australia) Simon Whitlock	6
(Northern Ireland) Brendan Dolan	6	(Northern Ireland) Brendan Dolan	5
(Scotland) Peter Wright	5

=== Players Championship 13 ===
Players Championship 13 in Crawley on 13 September.

Quarter-finals
1	Gary Anderson 96.50	6
9	Kim Huybrechts 93.08	5
Gerwyn Price 92.74	5
12	Adrian Lewis 92.25	6
31	Richie Burnett 90.08	6
7	Steve Beaton 90.30	4
3	Brendan Dolan 85.63	6
11	Mervyn King 81.06	3

Semi-finals
1	Gary Anderson 115.62	6
12	Adrian Lewis 94.16	0
31	Richie Burnett 83.58	6
3	Brendan Dolan 87.62	5

Final
1	Gary Anderson 97.28	6
31	Richie Burnett 91.44	5

=== Players Championship 14 ===
Players Championship 14 was contested on 14 September in Crawley. The tournament was won by Michael van Gerwen, who defeated Michael Smith 6–4 in the final.

Quarter-finals		Semi-finals		Final
(Austria) Rowby-John Rodriguez 81.63	1
(England) Ian White 95.37	6	(England) Ian White 90.55	2
(England) Michael Smith 107.83	6	(England) Michael Smith 93.98	6
(Netherlands) Benito van de Pas 95.91	4			(England) Michael Smith 94.18	4
(England) Dave Chisnall 93.21	5			(Netherlands) Michael van Gerwen 96.70	6
(England) Adrian Lewis 94.21	6	(England) Adrian Lewis 89.63	2
(England) Dean Winstanley 96.11	3	(Netherlands) Michael van Gerwen 99.05	6
(Netherlands) Michael van Gerwen 95.04	6

=== Players Championship 15 ===
Players Championship 15 in Dublin on 4 October.

Quarter-finals		Semi-finals		Final
(England) Adrian Lewis 96.86	6
(England) Dave Chisnall 99.83	2	(England) Adrian Lewis 100.59	5
(England) Justin Pipe 100.38	6	(England) Justin Pipe 102.79	6
(England) Dean Winstanley 91.04	1			(England) Justin Pipe 95.90	6
(Netherlands) Michael van Gerwen 100.79	6			(Netherlands) Michael van Gerwen 98.50	5
(England) Darren Webster 96.74	2	(Netherlands) Michael van Gerwen 99.17	6
(Northern Ireland) Brendan Dolan 96.12	6	(Northern Ireland) Brendan Dolan 90.36	1
(England) Andrew Gilding 98.28	4

=== Players Championship 16 ===
Players Championship 16 in Dublin on 5 October.

Quarter-finals		Semi-finals		Final
(Scotland) Gary Anderson	6
(England) Justin Pipe	4	(Scotland) Gary Anderson 102.82	6
(England) Stephen Bunting	6	(England) Stephen Bunting 95.32	2
(Australia) Kyle Anderson	1			(Scotland) Gary Anderson 93.82	2
(England) Joe Cullen	6			(Northern Ireland) Brendan Dolan 96.98	6
(Wales) Mark Webster	2	(England) Joe Cullen 99.12	3
(Northern Ireland) Brendan Dolan	6	(Northern Ireland) Brendan Dolan 101.51	6
(Belgium) Kim Huybrechts	2

=== Players Championship 17 ===
Players Championship 17 in Crawley on 18 October.

Quarter-finals		Semi-finals		Final
(Scotland) Gary Anderson 104.86	6
(England) Darren Webster 92.18	0	(Scotland) Gary Anderson 96.38	4
(England) James Wade 102.72	6	(England) James Wade 95.09	6
(Scotland) Robert Thornton 101.92	5			(England) James Wade 95.02	6
(Netherlands) Michael van Gerwen 100.30	6			(Belgium) Kim Huybrechts 94.67	5
(Netherlands) Benito van de Pas 94.75	4	(Netherlands) Michael van Gerwen 91.41	3
(Belgium) Kim Huybrechts 102.73	6	(Belgium) Kim Huybrechts 101.54	6
(England) Steve Beaton 95.09	3

=== Players Championship 18 ===
Players Championship 18 in Crawley on 19 October.

Quarter-finals		Semi-finals		Final
(England) James Wade 95.94	6
(England) Terry Jenkins 90.48	0	(England) James Wade 97.80	6
(Belgium) Kim Huybrechts 92.07	6	(Belgium) Kim Huybrechts 92.21	3
(Netherlands) Vincent van der Voort 93.84	4			(England) James Wade 91.18	2
(Netherlands) Michael van Gerwen 94.67	6			(Netherlands) Michael van Gerwen 96.76	6
(Scotland) Peter Wright 88.69	1	(Netherlands) Michael van Gerwen 89.84	6
(Germany) Jyhan Artut 98.86	6	(Germany) Jyhan Artut 92.84	4
(England) Ian White 98.21	3

=== Players Championship 19 ===
Players Championship 19 in Coventry on 22 November.

Quarter-finals		Semi-finals		Final
(Wales) Gerwyn Price 94.93	6
(England) Ross Smith 90.19	3	(Wales) Gerwyn Price 85.90	3
(England) Ian White 93.99	6	(England) Ian White 95.74	6
(England) Peter Hudson 84.30	4			(England) Ian White 90.35	6
(Northern Ireland) Brendan Dolan 91.98	6			(England) Dave Chisnall 86.95	2
(England) John Bowles 85.11	5	(Northern Ireland) Brendan Dolan 94.25	5
(England) Dave Chisnall 102.92	6	(England) Dave Chisnall 87.28	6
(England) Adrian Lewis 90.00	2

=== Players Championship 20 ===
Players Championship 20 in Coventry on 23 November.

Quarter-finals		Semi-finals		Final
(Scotland) Gary Anderson 109.60	6
(England) Ian White 100.00	2	(Scotland) Gary Anderson 98.26	6
(England) James Wade 96.11	6	(England) James Wade 95.17	5
(Netherlands) Ron Meulenkamp 85.72	3			(Scotland) Gary Anderson 99.75	6
(Australia) Simon Whitlock 91.46	6			(Scotland) Peter Wright 96.81	5
(England) Richie Howson 89.26	4	(Australia) Simon Whitlock 95.54	5
(Scotland) Peter Wright 108.65	6	(Scotland) Peter Wright 98.14	6
(India) Prakash Jiwa 91.52	0

== UK Open Qualifiers ==
No.	Date	Venue	Winner	Score	Runner-up	Ref.
1	Friday 7 February	Robin Park Tennis Centre, Wigan	Andy Hamilton (England)	6–2	(England) Adrian Lewis	
2	Saturday 8 February	Robin Park Tennis Centre, Wigan	Stephen Bunting (England)	6–5	(England) Andrew Gilding	
3	Sunday 9 February	Robin Park Tennis Centre, Wigan	Phil Taylor (England)	6–2	(England) Adrian Lewis	
4	Friday 21 February	Robin Park Tennis Centre, Wigan	Brendan Dolan (Northern Ireland)	6–1	(Wales) Jamie Lewis	
5	Saturday 22 February	Robin Park Tennis Centre, Wigan	Gary Anderson (Scotland)	6–2	(Scotland) Robert Thornton	
6	Sunday 23 February	Robin Park Tennis Centre, Wigan	Michael van Gerwen (Netherlands)	6–0	(England) Michael Smith	

== European Tour ==
European Tour events had 48 players competing in each event this year instead of the 64 previously used. The top 16 on the one year Pro Tour Order of Merit entered each tournament at the last 32 stage. Twenty players from the UK Qualifier, eight from the European Qualifier and four from the Host Nation Qualifier in each event met in the first round with the 16 winners going on to face the 16 seeded players.

There were eight European Tour events this year:

No.	Date	Also known as the	Venue	Winner	Score	Runner-up	Ref.
1	31 January–2 February	German Darts Championship	(Germany) Hildesheim, Halle 39	Gary Anderson (Scotland)	6–5	(England) Justin Pipe	
2	14–16 February	Dutch Darts Masters	(Netherlands) Veldhoven, NH Hotel Koningshof	Michael van Gerwen (Netherlands)	6–4	(England) Mervyn King	
3	19–21 April	German Darts Masters	(Germany) Berlin, Maritim Hotel	Phil Taylor (England)	6–4	(Netherlands) Michael van Gerwen	
4	20–22 June	Austrian Darts Open	(Austria) Salzburg, Salzburgarena	Vincent van der Voort (Netherlands)	6–5	(England) Jamie Caven	
5	27–29 June	Gibraltar Darts Trophy	Gibraltar, Victoria Stadium	James Wade (England)	6–4	(England) Steve Beaton	
6	11–13 July	European Darts Open	(Germany) Düsseldorf, Maritim Hotel	Peter Wright (Scotland)	6–2	(Australia) Simon Whitlock	
7	5–7 September	European Darts Grand Prix	(Germany) Sindelfingen, Glaspalast	Mervyn King (England)	6–5	(England) Michael Smith	
8	19–21 September	European Darts Trophy	(Germany) Leipzig, Kohlrabizirkus	Michael Smith (England)	6–5	(Netherlands) Michael van Gerwen	

== PDC Youth Tour ==
The PDC Unicorn Youth Tour was open to players aged 16–21. The players who finished first and second on the Order of Merit will receive two-year Tour Cards to move onto the PDC ProTour in 2015 and 2016. In addition, the players who finished from third to eighth will receive free entry to the 2015 PDC Qualifying School. Dimitri van den Bergh and Josh Payne were the top two players at the end of the year.

No.	Date	Winner	Legs	Runner-up	Ref.
1	Saturday 1 March	Nick Kenny (Wales)	4–2	(England) Josh Payne	
2	Saturday 1 March	Lewis Venes (England)	4–1	(England) Josh Payne	
3	Saturday 29 March	Mike Zuydwijk (Netherlands)	4–0	(England) James Hubbard	
4	Saturday 5 April	Dimitri Van den Bergh (Belgium)	4–2	(Canada) Shaun Narain	
5	Saturday 26 April	Sam Hewson (England)	4–0	(Netherlands) John de Kruijf	
6	Saturday 26 April	George Killington (England)	4–2	(Germany) Max Hopp	
7	Saturday 17 May	Dimitri Van den Bergh (Belgium)	4–3	(England) Adam Hunt	
8	Saturday 17 May	James Hubbard (England)	4–2	(England) Reece Robinson	
9	Saturday 31 May	Adam Hunt (England)	4–3	(Austria) Rowby-John Rodriguez	
10	Saturday 31 May	Nick Kenny (Wales)	4–1	(England) Sam Hewson	
11	Saturday 5 July	Dean Reynolds (Wales)	4–2	(Germany) Max Hopp	
12	Saturday 5 July	Reece Robinson (England)	4–2	(Belgium) Dimitri Van den Bergh	
13	Saturday 27 September	Dimitri Van den Bergh (Belgium)	4–1	(England) Adam Smith-Neale	
14	Saturday 27 September	Josh Payne (England)	4–3	(England) Keegan Brown	
15	Saturday 1 November	Keegan Brown (England)	4–3	(England) Jake Jones	
16	Saturday 1 November	Dean Reynolds (Wales)	4–3	(England) Josh Payne	

== PDC Challenge Tour ==
The PDC Unicorn Challenge Tour was open to all PDPA Associate Members who failed to win a Tour Card at Qualifying School. The players who finished first and second will receive two-year Tour Cards to move onto the PDC ProTour in 2015 and 2016. In addition, the players who finished from third to eighth will receive free entry to the 2015 PDC Qualifying School. Mark Frost and Alan Tabern were the top two players at the end of the year.

No.	Date	Winner	Legs	Runner-up	Ref.
1	Sunday 2 March	Jamie Robinson (England)	5–4	(England) Matthew Edgar	
2	Sunday 2 March	Ron Meulenkamp (Netherlands)	5–4	(England) Alan Tabern	
3	Sunday 30 March	Alan Tabern (England)	5–4	(England) Ian McFarlane	
4	Sunday 6 April	Matthew Edgar (England)	5–4	(England) Mark Frost	
5	Sunday 27 April	Colin Fowler (England)	5–2	(England) Mark Frost	
6	Sunday 27 April	Colin Fowler (England)	5–2	(England) Matt Clark	
7	Sunday 18 May	Alex Roy (England)	5–4	(England) Mark Lawrence	
8	Sunday 18 May	Alan Tabern (England)	5–3	(England) Dave Honey	
9	Sunday 1 June	Alan Tabern (England)	5–0	(England) Luke Woodhouse	
10	Sunday 1 June	Jay Foreman (England)	5–4	(Germany) Max Hopp	
11	Sunday 6 July	Mark Frost (England)	5–2	(England) Jamie Robinson	
12	Sunday 6 July	Brett Claydon (England)	5–4	(England) Aden Kirk	
13	Sunday 28 September	Mark Frost (England)	5–4	(India) Prakash Jiwa	
14	Sunday 28 September	Mark Frost (England)	5–1	(England) Steve Douglas	
15	Sunday 2 November	Colin Fowler (England)	5–1	(Netherlands) Dirk van Duijvenbode	
16	Sunday 2 November	Matt Clark (England)	5–4	(England) Steve Douglas	

== Scandinavian Darts Corporation Pro Tour ==
The Scandinavian Pro Tour had eight events this year, with a total of €40,000 on offer. The winner after all nine events (Jani Haavisto) will play in the 2015 World Championship.

No.	Date	Also known as	Venue	Winner	Legs	Runner-up	Ref.
1	Saturday 1 March	SDC Finland	Hotel Tallukka, Vääksy, Finland	Vesa Nuutinen (Finland)	6–1	(Finland) Uki Takkinen	
2	Saturday 1 March	SDC Finland	Hotel Tallukka, Vääksy, Finland	Ulf Ceder (Finland)	6–2	(Finland) Jarkko Komula	
3	Sunday 2 March	SDC Finland	Hotel Tallukka, Vääksy, Finland	Jani Haavisto (Finland)	6–4	(Finland) Ali Roberts	
4	Saturday 26 April	SDC Sweden	Scandic Molndal, Gothenburg, Sweden	Jani Haavisto (Finland)	6–3	(Finland) Jarkko Komula	
5	Saturday 26 April	SDC Sweden	Scandic Molndal, Gothenburg, Sweden	Marko Kantele (Finland)	6–4	(Finland) Jarkko Komula	
6	Sunday 27 April	SDC Sweden	Scandic Molndal, Gothenburg, Sweden	Jarkko Komula (Finland)	6–3	(Finland) Sami Sanssi	
7	Saturday 30 August	SDC Denmark	Park Inn Copenhagen Airport, Copenhagen, Denmark	Per Laursen (Denmark)	6–2	(Sweden) Daniel Larsson	
8	Saturday 30 August	SDC Denmark	Park Inn Copenhagen Airport, Copenhagen, Denmark	Kim Viljanen (Finland)	6–4	(Latvia) Madars Razma	
9	Sunday 31 August	SDC European Championship Qualifier	Park Inn Copenhagen Airport, Copenhagen, Denmark	Robert Wagner (Norway)	6–4	(Sweden) Magnus Caris	

== Eurasian Darts Corporation (EADC) Pro Tour ==
The 2 EADC Pro Tour events and the 2015 World Championship Qualifier will be played at Omega Plaza Business Center, Moscow. Players from Armenia, Azerbaijan, Belarus, Georgia, Kazakhstan, Kyrgyzstan, Moldova, Russia, Tajikistan, Turkmenistan, Uzbekistan and Ukraine are eligible to play.

No.	Date	Venue	Winner	Legs	Runner-up	Ref.
1	Saturday 26 April	(Russia) Moscow, Omega Plaza Business Center	Evgenii Zhukov (Russia)	6–5	(Russia) Andrey Ponomarenko	
2	Sunday 27 April	(Russia) Moscow, Omega Plaza Business Center	Evgenii Izotov (Russia)	6–4	(Russia) Nikolay Mikhalin	

== Australian Grand Prix Pro Tour ==
The Australian Grand Prix rankings are calculated from events across Australia. The top player in the rankings (Laurence Ryder) automatically qualified for the 2015 World Championship.

No.	Date	Also known as	Winner	Legs	Runner-up	Ref.
1	Saturday 1 February	Mittagong RSL Open 1	John Weber (Australia)	6–5	(Australia) Shane Tichowitsch	
2	Sunday 2 February	Mittagong RSL Open 2	Shane Tichowitsch (Australia)	6–3	(Australia) Bill Aitken	
3	Saturday 8 March	Dosh Perth Open 1	Laurence Ryder (Australia)	6–1	(Australia) Tic Bridge	
4	Sunday 9 March	Dosh Perth Open 2	David Platt (Australia)	6–4	(Australia) Laurence Ryder	
5	Saturday 29 March	Victoria Open 1	Laurence Ryder (Australia)	6–5	(Australia) David Platt	
6	Sunday 30 March	Victoria Open 2	Rob Modra (Australia)	6–5	(Australia) Tic Bridge	
7	Saturday 11 April	NDDA Open 1	Shane Tichowitsch (Australia)	6–1	(Australia) Lindsay Wells	
8	Sunday 12 April	NDDA Open 2	Shane Tichowitsch (Australia)	6–5	(Australia) Laurence Ryder	
9	Saturday 17 May	Russell Stewart Classic	David Platt (Australia)	6–2	(Australia) Rob Modra	
10	Sunday 18 May	DPA Australian Matchplay	Rob Modra (Australia)	6–1	(Australia) Laurence Ryder	
11	Saturday 20 June	Kirribilli Club Open 1	Laurence Ryder (Australia)	6–4	(Australia) David Platt	
12	Sunday 21 June	Kirribilli Club Open 2	Tic Bridge (Australia)	6–3	(Australia) David Platt	
13	Friday 18 July	Southern Illawarra Open 1	John Weber (Australia)	6–4	(Australia) David Platt	
14	Saturday 19 July	Southern Illawarra Open 2	Shane Tichowitsch (Australia)	6–4	(Australia) Laurence Ryder	
15	Sunday 24 August	DPA Australian Singles	Damon Heta (Australia)	6–3	(Australia) Laurence Ryder	
16	Sunday 24 August	Warilla Bowls Club Open 1	Laurence Ryder (Australia)	6–4	(Australia) Damon Heta	
17	Monday 25 August	Warilla Bowls Club Open 2	John Weber (Australia)	6–1	(New Zealand) Rob Szabo	
18	Monday 25 August	Sydney Masters Qualifier 1	Kyle Anderson (Australia)	5–3	(New Zealand) Rob Szabo	
19	Thursday 26 August	Sydney Masters Qualifier 2	Damon Heta (Australia)	5–4	(Australia) Gordon Mathers	

== Other PDC tournaments ==
The PDC also held a number of other tournaments during 2014. These were mainly smaller events with low prize money, and some have eligibility restrictions. All of these tournaments are non-ranking.

Date	Event	Winner	Score	Runner-Up	Ref.
July 13	PDC World New Zealand Qualifying Event	(New Zealand) Mark McGrath	11–6	(New Zealand) Jonathan Silcock	
September 28	South African Masters	(South Africa) Nolan Arendse	9–5	(South Africa) Devon Petersen	
October 11	PDC World South Asian Qualifying Event	(Philippines) Ian Perez	5–2	(Philippines) Bryan Eribal	
October 12	Tom Kirby Memorial Irish Matchplay	(Northern Ireland) Daryl Gurney	6–2	(Poland) Radek Szagański	
October 18-19	PDC World Darts Championship EADC Qualifier	(Russia) Boris Koltsov	6–1	(Russia) Igor Dzasokhov	
October 25	PDC World China Qualifying Event	(Hong Kong) Alex Hon	5–3	(China) Yuanjun Liu	
October 25	Bull's Super League Darts Iberia	(Spain) Cristo Reyes	6–0	(Spain) José V. Rodríguez	
November 9	Oceanic Masters	(Australia) John Weber	8–2	(New Zealand) Rob Szabo	
November 15	PDC World Central European Qualifying Event	(Netherlands) Jermaine Wattimena	6–3	(Belgium) Kenny Neyens	
November 22	PDC World Southern European Qualifying Event	(Greece) John Michael	6–4	(Italy) Marco Brentegani	
November 22	PDJ Japanese Qualifier	(Japan) Haruki Muramatsu	6–5	(Japan) Masumi Chino	
November 22	Bull's Super League Germany	(Germany) Max Hopp	10–8	(Germany) Sascha Stein	
November 22	Bull's Super League Eastern Europe	(Croatia) Robert Marijanović	10–7	(Croatia) Boris Krčmar	
December 1	PDC World Darts Championship PDPA Qualifier	(Scotland) Jason Hogg	5–2	(Hong Kong) Scott MacKenzie	
