= 2015 PDC Pro Tour =

Series of darts tournaments

The 2015 PDC Pro Tour was a series of non-televised darts tournaments organised by the Professional Darts Corporation (PDC). Professional Dart Players Association Players Championships, UK Open Qualifiers, and European Tour events were the events that made up the Pro Tour. This year there were 35 PDC Pro Tour events held – 20 Players Championships, six UK Open Qualifiers, and nine European Tour events.

== Prize money ==
Prize money for each Players Championship increased from £50,000 to £60,000 per event and the European Tour increased from £100,000 to £115,000 per event. UK Open Qualifiers stayed the same as last year.

Stage	ET	PC	UKQ	CT/DT
Winner	£25,000	£10,000	£10,000	£2,000
Runner-up	£10,000	£5,000	£5,000	£1,000
Semi-finalists	£5,000	£2,500	£2,500	£500
Quarter-finalists	£3,500	£2,000	£1,500	£300
Last 16	£2,000	£1,500	£1,000	£200
Last 32	£1,500	£750	£500	£100
Last 48	£1,000	N/A	N/A	N/A
Last 64	N/A	£250	£250	£50
Total	£115,000	£60,000	£50,000	£10,000

== PDC Pro Tour Card ==
128 players were granted Tour Cards, which enabled them to participate in all Players Championships, UK Open Qualifiers and European Tour events.

=== Tour Cards ===
The 2015 Tour Cards were awarded to:

- (64) The top 64 players from the PDC Order of Merit after the 2015 World Championship. (Richie Burnett and Jarkko Komula resigned their memberships; as a result, Cristo Reyes and Colin Osborne were awarded Tour Cards).
- (26) The 26 qualifiers from 2014 Q-School not ranked in the top 64 of the PDC Order of Merit following the World Championship.
- (2) Two highest qualifiers from 2014 Challenge Tour (Mark Frost and Alan Tabern).
- (2) Two highest qualifiers from 2014 Youth Tour (Dimitri Van den Bergh and Josh Payne).
- (34) The 34 qualifiers from 2015 Q-School.

The offer of four places for the semi-finalists of the 2015 BDO World Darts Championship were withdrawn from this year.

=== Q-School ===
The PDC Pro Tour Q-School took place at the Robin Park Tennis Centre in Wigan from January 14–17. The following players won two-year tour cards on each of the days played:

January 14	January 15	January 16	January 17
Nigel Heydon; Alan Norris; Jeffrey de Zwaan; Mike Zuydwijk	Matthew Edgar; Andy Jenkins; Jason Lovett; Devon Petersen	Steve Douglas; Steve West; James Wilson; Jason Wilson	Nathan Derry; Jamie Robinson; Jonny Clayton; Magnus Caris
376	367	369	348

A Q-School Order of Merit was also created by using the following points system:

Stage	Points
Last 8	9
Last 16	5
Last 32	3
Last 64	2
Last 128	1

To complete the field of 128 Tour Card Holders, places were allocated down the final Q-School Order of Merit. The following players picked up Tour Cards as a result:

1. Andy Boulton
2. Ken MacNeil
3. Jermaine Wattimena
4. Nathan Aspinall
5. Prakash Jiwa
6. Chris Dobey
7. Steve McNally
8. Haruki Muramatsu
9. Lee Palfreyman
10. Tony Richardson
11. Stephen Willard
12. Darren Johnson
13. Robbie Green
14. Jim Walker
15. William O'Connor
16. Johnny Haines
17. Curtis Hammond
18. Paul Milford

== UK Open Qualifiers ==
Six qualifiers took place to determine seedings for the 2015 UK Open.

No.	Date	Venue	Winner	Score	Runner-up	Ref.
1	Friday 6 February	(England) Wigan, Robin Park Tennis Centre	Adrian Lewis	6 – 1	Michael van Gerwen	
2	Saturday 7 February	(England) Wigan, Robin Park Tennis Centre	Michael van Gerwen	6 – 1	Vincent van der Voort	
3	Sunday 8 February	(England) Wigan, Robin Park Tennis Centre	Michael van Gerwen	6 – 1	James Wade	
4	Friday 20 February	(England) Wigan, Robin Park Tennis Centre	Michael van Gerwen	6 – 5	Jelle Klaasen	
5	Saturday 21 February	(England) Wigan, Robin Park Tennis Centre	Michael Smith	6 – 5	Adrian Lewis	
6	Sunday 22 February	(England) Wigan, Robin Park Tennis Centre	Phil Taylor	6 – 2	Ian White	

== Players Championships ==
There were 20 Players Championship events in 2015.

No.	Date	Venue	Winner	Score	Runner-up	Ref.
1	Saturday 14 March	(England) Barnsley, Barnsley Metrodome	Gary Anderson	6 – 5	James Wade	
2	Sunday 15 March	(England) Barnsley, Barnsley Metrodome	James Wade	6 – 5	Peter Wright	
3	Friday 10 April	(England) Barnsley, Barnsley Metrodome	Adrian Lewis	6 – 3	Robert Thornton	
4	Saturday 11 April	(England) Barnsley, Barnsley Metrodome	Michael van Gerwen	6 – 1	Adrian Lewis	
5	Sunday 12 April	(England) Barnsley, Barnsley Metrodome	Adrian Lewis	6 – 5	Brendan Dolan	
6	Friday 1 May	(England) Coventry, Ricoh Arena	Michael van Gerwen	6 – 5	James Wade	
7	Saturday 2 May	(England) Coventry, Ricoh Arena	Peter Wright	6 – 5	James Wade	
8	Sunday 3 May	(England) Coventry, Ricoh Arena	Keegan Brown	6 – 3	Adrian Lewis	
9	Saturday 16 May	(England) Crawley, K2 Leisure Centre	Phil Taylor	6 – 4	Gary Anderson	
10	Sunday 17 May	(England) Crawley, K2 Leisure Centre	Joe Murnan	6 – 4	Dave Chisnall	
11	Saturday 23 May	(England) Barnsley, Barnsley Metrodome	Dave Chisnall	6 – 1	Ian White	
12	Sunday 24 May	(England) Barnsley, Barnsley Metrodome	Peter Wright	6 – 1	Jelle Klaasen	
13	Saturday 4 July	(England) Wigan, Robin Park Tennis Centre	James Wade	6 – 5	Kim Huybrechts	
14	Sunday 5 July	(England) Wigan, Robin Park Tennis Centre	Jelle Klaasen	6 – 2	Ian White	
15	Saturday 26 September	(England) Barnsley, Barnsley Metrodome	Terry Jenkins	6 – 4	Peter Wright	
16	Sunday 27 September	(England) Barnsley, Barnsley Metrodome	Jelle Klaasen	6 – 4	Raymond van Barneveld	
17	Friday 2 October	(Republic of Ireland) Dublin, Citywest Hotel	Ian White	6 – 5	Dave Chisnall	
18	Saturday 3 October	(Republic of Ireland) Dublin, Citywest Hotel	Alan Norris	6 – 1	Kim Huybrechts	
19	Saturday 24 October	(England) Coventry, Ricoh Arena	Peter Wright	6 – 5	Benito van de Pas	
20	Sunday 25 October	(England) Coventry, Ricoh Arena	Gary Anderson	6 – 2	James Wade	

== PDC European Tour ==
No.	Date	Also known as the	Venue	Winner	Score	Runner-up	Ref.
1	13–15 February	German Darts Championship	(Germany) Hildesheim, Halle 39	Michael van Gerwen (117.94)	6 – 2	Gary Anderson (103.78)	
2	20–22 March	Gibraltar Darts Trophy	Gibraltar, Victoria Stadium	Michael van Gerwen (107.04)	6 – 3	Terry Jenkins (99.28)	
3	4–6 April	German Darts Masters	(Germany) Munich, Ballhausforum	Michael van Gerwen (102.30)	6 – 5	John Henderson (89.59)	
4	5–7 June	Dutch Darts Masters	(Netherlands) Venray, Evenementenhal	Michael van Gerwen (100.20)	6 – 0	Justin Pipe (87.62)	
5	19–21 June	International Darts Open	(Germany) Riesa, SACHSENarena	Michael Smith (88.23)	6 – 3	Benito van de Pas (81.41)	
6	10–12 July	European Darts Open	(Germany) Düsseldorf, Maritim Hotel	Robert Thornton (106.18)	6 – 2	Kim Huybrechts (100.69)	
7	11–13 September	European Darts Trophy	(Germany) Mülheim, RWE-Sporthalle	Michael Smith (98.50)	6 – 2	Michael van Gerwen (101.12)	
8	18–20 September	European Darts Matchplay	(Austria) Innsbruck, Olympiahalle	Michael van Gerwen (99.58)	6 – 4	Dave Chisnall (95.89)	
9	16–18 October	European Darts Grand Prix	(Germany) Sindelfingen, Glaspalast	Kim Huybrechts (99.30)	6 – 5	Peter Wright (99.95)	

== PDC Challenge Tour ==
The PDC Unicorn Challenge Tour was open to all PDPA Associate Members who failed to win a Tour Card at Qualifying School. The players who finished first and second received two-year Tour Cards to move onto the PDC Pro Tour in 2016 and 2017. In addition, the players who finished from third to eighth will receive free entry to the 2016 PDC Q-School.

Final Challenge Tour ranking
Rank	Player	Earnings
1	Jan Dekker	£7,350
2	Richie Corner	£7,350
3	Shaun Griffiths	£5,600
4	Chris Quantock	£4,650
5	Kirk Shepherd	£4,350
6	Joe Murnan	£4,250
7	Peter Hudson	£3,800
8	Dean Reynolds	£3,800

No.	Date	Venue	Winner	Legs	Runner-up	Ref.
1	Saturday 21 March	(England) Wigan, Robin Park Tennis Centre	Kirk Shepherd	5 – 3	Jack Tweddell	
2	Saturday 21 March	(England) Wigan, Robin Park Tennis Centre	Colin Fowler	5 – 2	Steve Maish	
3	Sunday 22 March	(England) Wigan, Robin Park Tennis Centre	Shaun Griffiths	5 – 1	Scott Dale	
4	Sunday 22 March	(England) Wigan, Robin Park Tennis Centre	Richie Corner	5 – 1	Ryan Searle	
5	Saturday 30 May	(England) Wigan, Robin Park Tennis Centre	Jan Dekker	5 – 0	Kurt Parry	
6	Saturday 30 May	(England) Wigan, Robin Park Tennis Centre	Matt Clark	5 – 2	Richie Corner	
7	Sunday 31 May	(England) Wigan, Robin Park Tennis Centre	Shaun Griffiths	5 – 2	Ian Lever	
8	Sunday 31 May	(England) Wigan, Robin Park Tennis Centre	Joe Murnan	5 – 3	Scott Dale	
9	Saturday 11 July	(England) Wigan, Robin Park Tennis Centre	Jan Dekker	5 – 1	Dean Reynolds	
10	Saturday 11 July	(England) Wigan, Robin Park Tennis Centre	Joe Murnan	5 – 1	Tony Randell	
11	Sunday 12 July	(England) Wigan, Robin Park Tennis Centre	Richie Corner	5 – 4	Mike Norton	
12	Sunday 12 July	(England) Wigan, Robin Park Tennis Centre	Dean Reynolds	5 – 3	Chris Quantock	
13	Saturday 19 September	(England) Coventry, Ricoh Arena	Chris Quantock	5 – 0	Paul Rowley	
14	Saturday 19 September	(England) Coventry, Ricoh Arena	Peter Hudson	5 – 4	Ryan Palmer	
15	Sunday 20 September	(England) Coventry, Ricoh Arena	Jan Dekker	5 – 2	Jon Jukes	
16	Sunday 20 September	(England) Coventry, Ricoh Arena	Martin Lukeman	5 – 2	Kirk Shepherd	

== PDC Development Tour ==
The PDC Unicorn Development Tour (formerly the PDC Youth Tour) was open to players aged 16–23. The players who finished first and second on the Order of Merit received two-year Tour Cards to move onto the PDC Pro Tour in 2016 and 2017. In addition, the players who finished from third to eighth will receive free entry to the 2016 PDC Q-School. Prize money was doubled from the 2014 season, with £200,000 on offer for the 17 youth events, including £40,000 for the 2015 PDC World Youth Championship.

Final Development Tour ranking
Rank	Player	Earnings
1	Bradley Kirk	£8,400
2	Mike De Decker	£6,900
3	Nathan Aspinall	£5,950
4	Benito van de Pas	£5,800
5	Berry van Peer	£5,550
6	Dimitri Van den Bergh	£5,150
7	Shaun Griffiths	£4,900
8	Josh Payne	£4,600

No.	Date	Venue	Winner	Legs	Runner-up	Ref.
1	Saturday 25 April	(England) Coventry, Ricoh Arena	Rowby-John Rodriguez	4 – 1	Jamie Lewis	
2	Saturday 25 April	(England) Coventry, Ricoh Arena	Berry van Peer	4 – 0	Scott Dale	
3	Sunday 26 April	(England) Coventry, Ricoh Arena	Aden Kirk	4 – 1	Benito van de Pas	
4	Sunday 26 April	(England) Coventry, Ricoh Arena	Berry van Peer	4 – 0	Harry Ward	
5	Saturday 27 June	(England) Coventry, Ricoh Arena	Mike De Decker	4 – 3	Benito van de Pas	
6	Saturday 27 June	(England) Coventry, Ricoh Arena	Benito van de Pas	4 – 2	Bradley Kirk	
7	Sunday 28 June	(England) Coventry, Ricoh Arena	Nathan Aspinall	4 – 2	Benito van de Pas	
8	Sunday 28 June	(England) Coventry, Ricoh Arena	Dimitri Van den Bergh	4 – 2	Rhys Griffin	
9	Saturday 12 September	(England) Coventry, Ricoh Arena	Jamie Lewis	4 – 2	Bradley Kirk	
10	Saturday 12 September	(England) Coventry, Ricoh Arena	Dimitri Van den Bergh	4 – 2	Josh Payne	
11	Sunday 13 September	(England) Coventry, Ricoh Arena	Mike De Decker	4 – 2	Nathan Aspinall	
12	Sunday 13 September	(England) Coventry, Ricoh Arena	Aaron Dyer	4 – 1	Shaun Griffiths	
13	Saturday 17 October	(England) Wigan, Robin Park Tennis Centre	Bradley Kirk	4 – 2	Nathan Aspinall	
14	Saturday 17 October	(England) Wigan, Robin Park Tennis Centre	Sven Groen	4 – 2	Nick Kenny	
15	Sunday 18 October	(England) Wigan, Robin Park Tennis Centre	Dean Reynolds	4 – 2	Mike De Decker	
16	Sunday 18 October	(England) Wigan, Robin Park Tennis Centre	Bradley Kirk	4 – 3	Josh Payne	

== Scandinavian Darts Corporation Pro Tour ==
The Scandinavian Pro Tour had eight events in 2015, with a total of €40,000 on offer. The top player, Kim Viljanen, and the runner-up, Per Laursen, on the 2015 SDC Order of Merit qualified to play in the 2016 World Championship preliminary round.

No.	Date	Venue	Winner	Legs	Runner-up	Ref.
1	Saturday 21 March	(Denmark) Copenhagen, Park Inn	Kim Viljanen	6 – 4	Steen Lysen	
2	Sunday 22 March	(Denmark) Copenhagen, Park Inn	Kim Viljanen	6 – 3	Dennis Nilsson	
3	Saturday 23 May	(Sweden) Stockholm, Scandic Alvik	Per Laursen	6 – 5	Magnus Caris	
4	Sunday 24 May	(Sweden) Stockholm, Scandic Alvik	Per Laursen	6 – 1	Oskar Lukasiak	
5	Saturday 1 August	(Russia) Moscow, Omega Plaza Business Center	Magnus Caris	6 – 3	Per Laursen	
6	Sunday 2 August	(Russia) Moscow, Omega Plaza Business Center	Kim Viljanen	6 – 3	Roman Obukhov	
7	Saturday 26 September	(Finland) Vääksy, Hotel Tallukka	Ulf Ceder	6 – 4	Hannu Suominen	
8	Saturday 26 September	(Finland) Vääksy, Hotel Tallukka	Marko Kantele	6 – 5	Magnus Caris	

== EuroAsian Darts Corporation (EADC) Pro Tour ==
The 6 EADC Pro Tour events and the 2016 World Championship Qualifier will be played at Omega Plaza Business Center, Moscow. Players from Armenia, Azerbaijan, Belarus, Georgia, Kazakhstan, Kyrgyzstan, Moldova, Russia, Tajikistan, Turkmenistan, Uzbekistan and Ukraine are eligible to play.

No.	Date	Venue	Winner	Legs	Runner-up	Ref.
1	Saturday 21 February	(Russia) Moscow, Omega Plaza Business Center	Aleksei Kadochnikov	6 – 4	Maxim Belov	
2	Sunday 22 February	(Russia) Moscow, Omega Plaza Business Center	Roman Obukhov	6 – 5	Maxim Belov	
3	Saturday 28 March	(Russia) Moscow, Omega Plaza Business Center	Roman Obukhov	6 – 3	Aleksandr Oreshkin	
4	Sunday 29 March	(Russia) Moscow, Omega Plaza Business Center	Roman Obukhov	6 – 0	Aleksandr Oreshkin	
5	Saturday 25 April	(Russia) Moscow, Omega Plaza Business Center	Alexey Pilipenko	6 – 5	Anton Kolesov	
6	Sunday 26 April	(Russia) Moscow, Omega Plaza Business Center	Boris Koltsov	6 – 2	Anton Kolesov	

== Australian Grand Prix Pro Tour ==
The Australian Grand Prix rankings are calculated from 25 events across Australia. The top player in the rankings, Laurence Ryder, automatically qualified for the 2016 World Championship.

No.	Date	Also known as	Winner	Legs	Runner-up	Ref.
1	Friday 13 February	Ettamogah Harrows Australian Grand Prix 1	John Weber	6 – 4	Jeremy Fagg	
2	Saturday 14 February	Ettamogah Harrows Australian Grand Prix 2	Laurence Ryder	6 – 5	John Weber	
3	Sunday 15 February	Ettamogah Harrows Australian Grand Prix 3	Barry Gardner	6 – 5	Dave Marland	
4	Friday 6 March	Dosh Balcatta AGP 1	Robbie King	6 – 1	Wayne Clegg	
5	Saturday 7 March	Dosh Balcatta AGP 2	Beau Anderson	6 – 2	Shane Tichowitsch	
6	Sunday 8 March	Dosh Balcatta AGP 3	Jeremy Fagg	6 – 5	Laurence Ryder	
7	Saturday 28 March	DPA Australian Matchplay 1	Rob Modra	6 – 1	Laurence Ryder	
8	Sunday 29 March	DPA Australian Matchplay 2	David Platt	6 – 2	Laurence Ryder	
9	Saturday 11 April	South Australian Open 1	Peter Machin	6 – 4	Rob Modra	
10	Sunday 12 April	South Australian Open 2	David Platt	6 – 0	Raymond O'Donnell	
11	Saturday 16 May	Warilla Bowls Club Open 1	David Platt	6 – 0	Laurence Ryder	
12	Sunday 17 May	Warilla Bowls Club Open 2	John Weber	6 – 5	Rob Modra	
13	Friday 29 May	Queensland Open 1	Chris Morrison	6 – 3	Stuart Leach	
14	Saturday 30 May	Queensland Open 2	Laurence Ryder	6 – 3	David Platt	
15	Sunday 31 May	Queensland Open 3	David Platt	6 – ?	John Weber	
16	Saturday 20 June	Victoria Open 1	David Platt	6 – 5	Bill Aitken	
17	Sunday 21 June	Victoria Open 2	Rob Modra	6 – 4	John Weber	
18	Saturday 8 August	Perth Masters Qualifier 1	Adam Rowe	5 – 0	Graham Parker	
19	Sunday 9 August	Perth Masters Qualifier 2	Kim Lewis	5 – 1	Conan Ugle	
20	Monday 17 August	Sydney Masters Qualifier 1	Cody Harris	6 – 2	Warren Parry	
21	Tuesday 18 August	Sydney Masters Qualifier 2	Tic Bridge	6 – 2	John Weber	
22	Wednesday 19 August	Sydney Masters Qualifier 3	Warren Parry	6 – 4	John Weber	
23	Thursday 5 November	Harrows Australian GP 1	Bill Aitken	6 – 3	Tyson Hoeful	
24	Friday 6 November	Harrows Australian GP 2	Cody Harris	6 – 4	Adam Rowe	
25	Saturday 7 November	Harrows Australian GP 3	John Weber	6 – 3	Cody Harris	
26	Sunday 8 November	Harrows Oceanic Classic	Tony David	6 – 1	Peter Hunt	

== World Championship PDPA Qualifier ==
Date	Venue	Winner	Score	Runner-up	Ref.
Monday 30 November	(England) Coventry, Ricoh Arena	Ricky Evans	5 – 4	Andy Boulton	

== World Darts Championship international qualifiers ==
Date	Event	Winner	Score	Runner-up	Ref.
Thursday 26 March	DARTSLIVE SUPERDARTS	Paul Lim	4 – 2	Boris Krčmar	
Sunday 12 July	DPNZ Qualifier	Rob Szabo	9 – 3	Craig Caldwell	
Saturday 22 August	South Asia Qualifier	Thanawat Gaweenuntawong	Beat	Tengku Shah	
Sunday 23 August	North American Qualifier	Darin Young	3 – 2	Larry Butler	
26–27 September	South African Masters	Warrick Scheffer	9 – 2	Clifford Stradling	
Saturday 10 October	Tom Kirby Memorial Irish Matchplay	Mick McGowan	6 – 5	Tom Biggane	
Friday 23 October	Philippine Qualifier	Alex Tagarao	3 – 2	Lourence Ilagan	
Saturday 24 October	Southern Europe Qualifier	John Michael	6 – 4	Toni Alcinas	
24–25 October	Russian Qualifier	Aleksandr Oreshkin	3 – 1	Anton Kolesov	
Saturday 7 November	Greater China Qualifier	Sun Qiang	2 – 1	Yuyi Shao	
Sunday 8 November	Oceanic Masters	Koha Kokiri	8 – 4	Warren Parry	
Sunday 8 November	PDJ Japanese Qualifier	Keita Ono	6 – 0	Yuki Yamada	
Saturday 14 November	German Qualifier	René Eidams	10 – 8	Maik Langendorf	
Saturday 14 November	Eastern Europe Qualifier	Michael Rasztovits	10 – 7	Boris Krčmar	
Sunday 15 November	Central Europe Qualifier	Sven Groen	6 – 3	Mario Robbe	

Scandinavian Pro Tour			Australian Grand Prix		
Rank	Player	Money	Rank	Player	Points
1	(Finland) Kim Viljanen	€4,400	1	(Australia) Laurence Ryder	204
2	(Denmark) Per Laursen	€3,875	2	(Australia) John Weber	180
3	(Sweden) Magnus Caris	€3,175	3	(England) David Platt	176
4	(Finland) Marko Kantele	€2,250	4	(Australia) Robbie King	116
5	(Sweden) Oskar Lukasiak	€1,675	5	(Australia) Jeremy Fagg	104
6	(Finland) Ulf Ceder	€1,200	5	(Australia) Bill Aitken	104
7	(Gibraltar) Hannu Suominen	€1,075	7	(Australia) Rob Modra	96
7	(Sweden) Dennis Nilsson	€1,075	8	(England) Wayne Clegg	88
9	(Sweden) Daniel Larsson	€925	9	(Australia) Barry Gardner	60
10	(Denmark) Per Skau	€750	9	(Australia) Shane Tichowitsch	60

First round qualifiers
Preliminary round qualifiers
