= 2011 PDC World Darts Championship =

Tournament information
- Dates: 16 December 2010 – 3 January 2011
- Venue: Alexandra Palace
- Location: London, England
- Organisation(s): Professional Darts Corporation (PDC)
- Format: Legs (preliminaries); Sets (from Round 1); Final – first to 7 sets
- Prize fund: £1,000,000
- Winner's share: £200,000
- Nine-dart finish: Adrian Lewis
- High checkout: 170; Tony Eccles; Terry Jenkins

Champion(s)
- Adrian Lewis (ENG)

The 2011 PDC World Darts Championship (known for sponsorship reasons as the 2011 Ladbrokes.com World Darts Championship) was the eighteenth World Championship organised by the Professional Darts Corporation since it separated from the British Darts Organisation. The event took place at the Alexandra Palace, London from 16 December 2010 to 3 January 2011. A total of 72 players took part, 16 of whom began at the preliminary round stage, with the eight winners joining the remaining 56 players in the first round proper.

Phil Taylor was the defending champion, having won the 2010 tournament. He was knocked out of the tournament at the quarter-final stage by Mark Webster, who in turn was defeated by Adrian Lewis in the semi-finals. Lewis went on to win the tournament, beating Gary Anderson 7–5 in the final to become only the fifth different PDC World Champion and the first to have won it without having won the rival BDO World Championship.

The final between Adrian Lewis and Gary Anderson was notable for a number of reasons. It was the last match that Sid Waddell commentated on at the PDC World Darts Championship before his death in 2012. It was the first ever nine-dart finish in a PDC World Championship final, hit by Lewis in the third leg of the match and not accomplished again until Michael Smith did so in 2023 against Michael van Gerwen. And it was also the first PDC World Championship final involving 2 players that were playing in their first World final.

4-time PDC World Championship semi-finalist Wayne Mardle was a notable absentee, missing out on his first World Championship since 1999. The 3-time PDC World Championship finalist Peter Manley was also another notable absentee, having missed out in his first World Championship since qualifying every year from 1997 to 2010.

== Format and qualifiers ==
The televised stages featured 72 players from a minimum of 22 countries. The top 32 players in the PDC Order of Merit on 29 November 2010 were seeded for the tournament. They were joined by the 16 highest non qualified players in the Players Championship Order of Merit from events played on the PDC Pro Tour.

These 48 players were joined by two PDPA qualifiers (which were determined at a PDPA Qualifying event held in Derby on November 29, 2010), and 22 international players: the 4 highest names in the European Order of Merit not already qualified, the 2 highest names in the North American Order of Merit not already qualified and 16 further international qualifiers determined by the PDC and PDPA.

Some of the international players, such as the 4 from the European Order of Merit, and the top American and Australian players were entered straight into the first round, while others, having won qualifying events in their countries, were entered into the preliminary round.

Order of Merit

1. (England) Phil Taylor
2. (England) James Wade
3. (Netherlands) Raymond van Barneveld
4. (Australia) Simon Whitlock
5. (England) Adrian Lewis
6. (England) Mervyn King
7. (England) Terry Jenkins
8. (England) Ronnie Baxter
9. (England) Colin Lloyd
10. (England) Mark Walsh
11. (Scotland) Gary Anderson
12. (England) Andy Hamilton
13. (England) Wayne Jones
14. (England) Colin Osborne
15. (England) Wes Newton
16. (Australia) Paul Nicholson
17. (Netherlands) Co Stompé
18. (England) Kevin Painter
19. (England) Jamie Caven
20. (Netherlands) Vincent van der Voort
21. (Scotland) Robert Thornton
22. (England) Dennis Priestley
23. (England) Alan Tabern
24. (England) Steve Beaton
25. (Wales) Mark Webster
26. (Netherlands) Jelle Klaasen
27. (England) Andy Smith
28. (England) Mark Dudbridge
29. (England) Denis Ovens
30. (Wales) Barrie Bates
31. (Netherlands) Michael van Gerwen
32. (Canada) John Part

Pro Tour

1. (England) Steve Farmer
2. (Wales) Richie Burnett
3. (England) Steve Brown
4. (England) Justin Pipe
5. (England) Tony Eccles
6. (England) Dennis Smith
7. (England) Nigel Heydon
8. (Northern Ireland) Brendan Dolan
9. (England) Steve Hine
10. (England) Steve Maish
11. (England) Kevin McDine
12. (England) Mark Hylton
13. (England) Chris Thompson
14. (Scotland) Peter Wright
15. (Wales) Steve Evans
16. (England) Joe Cullen
17. (England) Kirk Shepherd^{1}

European Order of Merit
First round qualifiers

- (Spain) Antonio Alcinas
- (Germany) Andree Welge
- (Germany) Bernd Roith
- (Austria) Mensur Suljović

PDPA qualifiers
First round qualifier

- (England) Alex Roy

Preliminary round qualifier

- (England) Matt Padgett^{2}

International qualifiers
First round qualifiers

- (United States) Darin Young
- (Australia) Shane Tichowitsch
- ~~(Australia) Rob Modra~~^{1}

Preliminary round qualifiers

- ~~(Russia) Andrei Ratnikov~~^{2}
- (United States) Gary Mawson
- (Germany) Jyhan Artut
- (Austria) Dietmar Burger
- (Sweden) Magnus Caris
- (Philippines) Juanito Gionson
- (Japan) Morihiro Hashimoto
- (Croatia) Boris Krčmar
- (Denmark) Per Laursen
- (Hong Kong) Scott MacKenzie
- (Guyana) Norman Madhoo
- (Northern Ireland) Mickey Mansell
- (South Africa) Devon Petersen
- (New Zealand) Preston Ridd
- (Netherlands) Roland Scholten
- (Finland) Veijo Viinikka

1 Rob Modra was unable to get a visa, so therefore, he was replaced by Kirk Shepherd, the next highest ranked player in the Players Championship Order of Merit.

== Prize money ==
The 2011 World Championship featured a prize fund of £1,000,000 – the same as in the previous year. The Third Place Playoff did not take place this year.

The prize money is allocated as follows:

Position (num. of players)		Prize money (Total: £1,000,000)
Winner	(1)	£200,000
Runner-Up	(1)	£100,000
Semi-finalists	(2)	£50,000
Quarter-finalists	(4)	£25,000
Third round losers	(8)	£15,000
Second round losers	(16)	£10,000
First round losers	(32)	£6,000
Preliminary round losers	(8)	£3,500
Nine-dart finish	(1)	£10,000

== Draw ==
=== Preliminary round ===
The preliminary round was played from Dec 16 to Dec 23 with one match per day. The format was best of 7 legs.

Player 1	Score	Player 2
(United States) Gary Mawson 92.44	4–1	(Philippines) Juanito Gionson 90.81
(Netherlands) Roland Scholten 82.15	4–2	(Finland) Veijo Viinikka 75.93
(England) Matt Padgett 83.10	2–4	(Japan) Morihiro Hashimoto 87.30
(Denmark) Per Laursen 91.05	4–2	(Croatia) Boris Krčmar 84.89
(Germany) Jyhan Artut 83.86	4–3	(Hong Kong) Scott MacKenzie 84.94
(Northern Ireland) Mickey Mansell 82.70	0–4	(New Zealand) Preston Ridd 84.68
(South Africa) Devon Petersen 90.16	4–3	(Guyana) Norman Madhoo 82.05
(Sweden) Magnus Caris 80.24	4–3	(Austria) Dietmar Burger 76.81

=== Last 64 ===
The winner of the eight preliminary-round matches joined 56 other players in the first round.

The first round draw took place on Tuesday 30 November live in the studio of Sky Sports News, and was conducted by 1983 World champion Keith Deller and Sky Sports darts' analyst and former World Matchplay champion, Rod Harrington.

==== Finals ====
Quarter-finals (best of 9 sets); 1 January
1	(England) Phil Taylor 101.74	2
25	(Wales) Mark Webster 98.01	5
5	(England) Adrian Lewis 100.03	5
20	(Netherlands) Vincent van der Voort 93.17	2
15	(England) Wes Newton 91.94	4
7	(England) Terry Jenkins 93.52	5
11	(Scotland) Gary Anderson 102.75	5
3	(Netherlands) Raymond van Barneveld 93.79	1

Semi-finals (best of 11 sets); 2 January
25	(Wales) Mark Webster 96.38	4
5	(England) Adrian Lewis 98.48	6
7	(England) Terry Jenkins 97.01	2
11	(Scotland) Gary Anderson 101.11	6

Final (best of 13 sets); 3 January
5	(England) Adrian Lewis 99.40	7
11	(Scotland) Gary Anderson 99.41	5

==== Rounds 1-4 ====
First round (best of 5 sets); 16–23 December
1	(England) Phil Taylor 88.49	3
(United States) Gary Mawson 77.49	0
32	(Canada) John Part 86.76	0
(Denmark) Per Laursen 83.66	3
16	(Australia) Paul Nicholson 97.39	3
(England) Steve Farmer 93.90	0
17	(Netherlands) Co Stompé 88.74	1
(Scotland) Peter Wright 86.76	3
8	(England) Ronnie Baxter 94.10	3
(Netherlands) Roland Scholten 90.65	0
25	(Wales) Mark Webster 98.93	3
(England) Steve Maish 93.76	0
9	(England) Colin Lloyd 84.35	3
(Germany) Andree Welge 84.65	2
24	(England) Steve Beaton 89.79	2
(England) Mark Hylton 90.14	3
5	(England) Adrian Lewis 94.87	3
(England) Tony Eccles 94.84	0
28	(England) Mark Dudbridge 92.60	3
(England) Alex Roy 85.70	1
12	(England) Andy Hamilton 79.42	3
(England) Dennis Smith 80.10	0
21	(Scotland) Robert Thornton 91.23	3
(England) Nigel Heydon 91.53	1
4	(Australia) Simon Whitlock 90.41	3
(Wales) Steve Evans 87.35	0
29	(England) Denis Ovens 88.87	3
(Germany) Jyhan Artut 80.71	1
13	(England) Wayne Jones 92.63	3
(England) Kirk Shepherd 85.74	1
20	(Netherlands) Vincent van der Voort 85.85	3
(New Zealand) Preston Ridd 71.29	0
2	(England) James Wade 91.53	3
(Spain) Antonio Alcinas 85.92	0
31	(Netherlands) Michael van Gerwen 84.17	1
(Austria) Mensur Suljović 91.51	3
15	(England) Wes Newton 87.95	3
(United States) Darin Young 80.57	0
18	(England) Kevin Painter 84.84	0
(Northern Ireland) Brendan Dolan 96.32	3
7	(England) Terry Jenkins 87.11	3
(England) Joe Cullen 81.77	2
26	(Netherlands) Jelle Klaasen 84.03	1
(England) Steve Brown 91.46	3
10	(England) Mark Walsh 93.48	3
(England) Justin Pipe 91.83	1
23	(England) Alan Tabern 91.14	3
(Wales) Richie Burnett 86.02	2
6	(England) Mervyn King 94.25	3
(Sweden) Magnus Caris 83.68	0
27	(England) Andy Smith 93.26	3
(Australia) Shane Tichowitsch 87.58	1
11	(Scotland) Gary Anderson 103.26	3
(Japan) Morihiro Hashimoto 87.44	0
22	(England) Dennis Priestley 92.21	3
(Germany) Bernd Roith 83.12	0
3	(Netherlands) Raymond van Barneveld 94.28	3
(England) Steve Hine 85.70	1
30	(Wales) Barrie Bates 78.80	1
(England) Kevin McDine 77.65	3
14	(England) Colin Osborne 93.02	3
(England) Chris Thompson 88.47	1
19	(England) Jamie Caven 84.28	3
(South Africa) Devon Petersen 79.82	1

Second round (best of 7 sets); 27–29 December
1	(England) Taylor 102.09	4
(Denmark) Laursen 93.19	0
16	(Australia) Nicholson 89.93	2
(Scotland) Wright 85.39	4
8	(England) Baxter 95.00	0
25	(Wales) Webster 97.22	4
9	(England) Lloyd 91.14	2
(England) Hylton 93.52	4
5	(England) Lewis 90.28	4
28	(England) Dudbridge 87.66	1
12	(England) Hamilton 86.49	0
21	(Scotland) Thornton 90.16	4
4	(Australia) Whitlock 102.86	4
29	(England) Ovens 86.50	0
13	(England) Jones 92.88	2
20	(Netherlands) van der Voort 93.96	4
2	(England) Wade 89.54	2
(Austria) Suljović 88.55	4
15	(England) Newton 92.63	4
(Northern Ireland) Dolan 91.07	0
7	(England) Jenkins 91.96	4
(England) Brown 85.50	1
10	(England) Walsh 89.33	4
23	(England) Tabern 87.45	3
6	(England) King 94.45	3
27	(England) A. Smith 93.05	4
11	(Scotland) Anderson 103.44	4
22	(England) Priestley 97.26	2
3	(Netherlands) van Barneveld 98.24	4
(England) McDine 91.93	1
14	(England) Osborne 89.82	4
19	(England) Caven 88.91	0

Third round (best of 7 sets); 29–30 December
1	(England) Taylor 98.07	4
(Scotland) Wright 96.56	1
25	(Wales) Webster 93.25	4
(England) Hylton 91.81	1
5	(England) Lewis 101.05	4
21	(Scotland) Thornton 92.23	1
4	(Australia) Whitlock 96.81	2
20	(Netherlands) van der Voort 94.95	4
(Austria) Suljović 84.76	0
15	(England) Newton 97.34	4
7	(England) Jenkins 99.05	4
10	(England) Walsh 91.79	0
27	(England) A. Smith 92.97	0
11	(Scotland) Anderson 108.39	4
3	(Netherlands) van Barneveld 97.19	4
14	(England) Osborne 90.63	3

Quarter-finals (best of 9 sets); 1 January
1	(England) Taylor 101.74	2
25	(Wales) Webster 98.01	5
5	(England) Lewis 100.03	5
20	(Netherlands) van der Voort 93.17	2
15	(England) Newton 91.94	4
7	(England) Jenkins 93.52	5
11	(Scotland) Anderson 102.75	5
3	(Netherlands) van Barneveld 93.79	1

== Final ==
Final: Best of 13 sets. Referees: George Noble (first half) and Russ Bray (second half). Alexandra Palace, London, England, 3 January 2011.
(5) Adrian Lewis (England)	7 – 5	(Scotland) Gary Anderson (11)
3 – 1, 3 – 0, 0 – 3, 3 – 1, 1 – 3, 1 – 3, 3 – 1, 3 – 2, 1 – 3, 3 – 1, 1 – 3, 0 – 3, 3 – 0
99.80	Average (3 darts)	99.41
20	180 scores	10
141	Highest checkout	164
0% (0/0)	Checkout summary	0% (0/0)

== Statistics ==
Player	Eliminated	Played	Sets Won	Sets Lost	Legs Won	Legs Lost	100+	140+	180s	High checkout	Average
(England) Adrian Lewis	Winner	6	29	13	101	70	221	119	60	167	97.35
(Scotland) Gary Anderson	Runner-up	6	27	12	93	62	167	136	58	164	103.06
(Wales) Mark Webster	Semi-finals	5	20	9	73	49	148	102	24	167	96.76
(England) Terry Jenkins	Semi-finals	5	18	13	71	54	182	91	29	170	93.73
(England) Phil Taylor	Quarter-finals	4	13	6	46	32	109	68	17	126	97.60
(Netherlands) Raymond van Barneveld	Quarter-finals	4	12	10	50	43	112	79	23	156	95.88
(England) Wes Newton	Quarter-finals	4	15	5	51	32	103	61	11	136	92.47
(Netherlands) Vincent van der Voort	Quarter-finals	4	13	9	44	42	111	60	19	148	91.98
(Australia) Simon Whitlock	Third round	3	9	4	33	17	57	46	16	164	96.69
(England) Andy Smith	Third round	3	7	8	31	28	85	40	19	140	93.09
(England) Mark Hylton	Third round	3	9	8	37	33	87	47	18	138	91.82
(England) Mark Walsh	Third round	3	7	8	32	36	86	45	16	146	91.53
(Scotland) Robert Thornton	Third round	3	8	5	27	28	87	33	10	125	91.21
(England) Colin Osborne	Third round	3	10	5	35	29	71	37	14	139	91.16
(Austria) Mensur Suljović	Third round	3	7	7	29	31	76	32	13	136	88.27
(Scotland) Peter Wright	Third round	3	8	7	32	29	77	48	6	120	87.57
(England) Dennis Priestley	Second round	2	5	4	21	17	47	28	12	111	94.74
(England) Ronnie Baxter	Second round	2	3	4	15	15	32	27	6	118	94.55
(England) Mervyn King	Second round	2	6	4	22	18	63	36	6	136	94.35
(Northern Ireland) Brendan Dolan	Second round	2	3	4	15	14	42	20	5	108	93.70
(Australia) Paul Nicholson	Second round	2	5	4	18	18	37	35	7	141	93.66
(England) Wayne Jones	Second round	2	5	5	20	18	60	31	9	120	92.76
(England) James Wade	Second round	2	5	4	22	17	48	28	2	121	90.54
(England) Mark Dudbridge	Second round	2	4	5	18	21	42	19	12	107	90.13
(Denmark) Per Laursen	Second round	3	3	4	17	19	56	23	3	106	89.30
(England) Alan Tabern	Second round	2	6	6	27	25	86	32	12	160	89.30
(England) Steve Brown	Second round	2	4	5	15	19	43	19	9	126	88.48
(England) Colin Lloyd	Second round	2	5	6	19	25	45	29	6	136	87.75
(England) Denis Ovens	Second round	2	3	5	13	18	36	22	2	106	87.69
(England) Jamie Caven	Second round	2	3	5	17	20	54	17	6	161	86.60
(England) Kevin McDine	Second round	2	4	5	17	22	48	14	8	120	84.79
(England) Andy Hamilton	Second round	2	3	4	15	15	42	10	6	106	82.96
(England) Tony Eccles	First round	1	0	3	6	9	13	11	8	170	94.84
(England) Steve Farmer	First round	1	0	3	3	9	10	15	1	161	93.90
(England) Steve Maish	First round	1	0	3	2	9	10	9	2	58	93.76
(England) Justin Pipe	First round	1	1	3	7	9	21	11	4	167	91.83
(England) Nigel Heydon	First round	1	1	3	8	10	30	12	2	61	91.53
(England) Steve Beaton	First round	1	2	3	11	13	29	14	4	75	89.79
(Netherlands) Co Stompé	First round	1	1	3	6	11	18	11	4	111	88.74
(England) Chris Thompson	First round	1	1	3	6	10	26	10	2	96	88.47
(Australia) Shane Tichowitsch	First round	1	1	3	3	11	15	12	2	40	87.58
(Japan) Morihiro Hashimoto	First round	2	0	3	4	11	19	6	4	61	87.37
(Wales) Steve Evans	First round	1	0	3	2	9	18	8	0	35	87.35
(Canada) John Part	First round	1	0	3	5	9	15	7	7	100	86.76
(Netherlands) Roland Scholten	First round	2	0	3	7	11	21	12	4	112	86.40
(Wales) Richie Burnett	First round	1	2	3	7	10	27	10	2	64	86.02
(Spain) Antonio Alcinas	First round	1	0	3	2	9	14	6	2	20	85.92
(England) Kirk Shepherd	First round	1	1	3	5	10	16	9	1	40	85.74
(England) Steve Hine	First round	1	1	3	7	11	29	6	1	88	85.70
(England) Alex Roy	First round	1	1	3	7	10	14	8	4	68	85.70
(South Africa) Devon Petersen	First round	2	1	3	12	14	22	13	5	146	84.99
(United States) Gary Mawson	First round	2	0	3	8	10	16	14	3	81	84.97
(England) Kevin Painter	First round	1	0	3	2	9	17	5	1	156	84.84
(Germany) Andree Welge	First round	1	2	3	9	10	25	6	3	63	84.65
(Netherlands) Michael van Gerwen	First round	1	1	3	6	9	12	9	4	82	84.17
(Netherlands) Jelle Klaasen	First round	1	1	3	5	10	13	9	2	111	84.03
(Germany) Bernd Roith	First round	1	0	3	2	9	16	7	0	96	83.12
(Germany) Jyhan Artut	First round	2	1	3	10	14	29	10	4	112	82.29
(Sweden) Magnus Caris	First round	2	0	3	6	12	25	8	2	55	81.96
(England) Joe Cullen	First round	1	2	3	6	13	20	7	4	59	81.77
(United States) Darin Young	First round	1	0	3	3	9	12	6	2	32	80.57
(England) Dennis Smith	First round	1	0	3	3	9	15	7	1	40	80.10
(Wales) Barrie Bates	First round	1	1	3	8	9	29	10	0	116	78.80
(New Zealand) Preston Ridd	First round	2	0	0	5	9	13	6	1	104	77.99
(Philippines) Juanito Gionson	Prelim. Round	1	0	0	1	4	11	2	1	96	90.81
(Hong Kong) Scott MacKenzie	Prelim. Round	1	0	0	3	4	8	4	0	60	84.94
(Croatia) Boris Krčmar	Prelim. Round	1	0	0	2	4	4	4	1	76	84.89
(England) Matt Padgett	Prelim. Round	1	0	0	2	4	6	3	0	40	83.10
(Northern Ireland) Michael Mansell	Prelim. Round	1	0	0	0	4	5	5	0	—	82.70
(Guyana) Norman Madhoo	Prelim. Round	1	0	0	3	4	6	4	1	36	82.05
(Austria) Dietmar Burger	Prelim. Round	1	0	0	3	4	12	1	0	64	76.81
(Finland) Veijo Viinikka	Prelim. Round	1	0	0	2	4	6	2	1	40	75.93

== Representation from different countries ==
This table shows the number of players by country in the World Championship, the total number including the preliminary round.

	(England) ENG	(Netherlands) NED	(Scotland) SCO	(Australia) AUS	(Wales) WAL	(Austria) AUT	(Germany) GER	(Northern Ireland) NIR	(New Zealand) NZL	(Canada) CAN	(Spain) SPA	(South Africa) RSA	(United States) USA	(Japan) JPN	(Finland) FIN	(Philippines) PHI	(Denmark) DEN	(Croatia) CRO	(Hong Kong) HKG	(Sweden) SWE	(Guyana) GUY	Total
Final	1	0	1	0	0	0	0	0	0	0	0	0	0	0	0	0	0	0	0	0	0	2
Semis	2	0	1	0	1	0	0	0	0	0	0	0	0	0	0	0	0	0	0	0	0	4
Quarters	4	2	1	0	1	0	0	0	0	0	0	0	0	0	0	0	0	0	0	0	0	8
Round 3	8	2	3	1	1	1	0	0	0	0	0	0	0	0	0	0	0	0	0	0	0	16
Round 2	21	2	3	2	1	1	0	1	0	0	0	0	0	0	0	0	1	0	0	0	0	32
Round 1	34	6	3	3	4	1	3	1	1	1	1	1	2	1	0	0	1	0	0	1	0	64
Prelim.	1	1	0	0	0	1	1	1	1	0	0	1	1	1	1	1	1	1	1	1	1	16
Total	35	6	3	3	4	2	3	2	1	1	1	1	2	1	1	1	1	1	1	1	1	72

== Television coverage ==
Sky Sports broadcast all 72 matches live in high-definition in the United Kingdom. Dave Clark presented the coverage with analysis from Rod Harrington and Eric Bristow. They also commentated on matches along with Sid Waddell (in his final PDC World Darts Championship commentating appearance), John Gwynne, Nigel Pearson, Rod Studd and Stuart Pyke. This was the first PDC World Championship where Dave Lanning wasn't commentating having retired prior to the tournament. Due to the ill health of Harrington, Wayne Mardle replaced him post-Christmas and featured both commentating and co-presenting alongside Clark. Former England cricketer Andrew Flintoff was also a guest commentator twice during tournament. Interviews were handled by either Clark, Bristow or Studd.

In the Netherlands SBS6 broadcast all matches live through a live stream on the SBS6 website and Sport1 broadcast all the matches on television, both with commentary provided by Jacques Nieuwlaat and Leo Oldenburger. In Germany it was broadcast live on Sport1 with co-commentary provided by Roland Scholten, and in Australia it was broadcast live on Fox Sports.
