= Christian Kist =

Dutch darts player (born 1986)

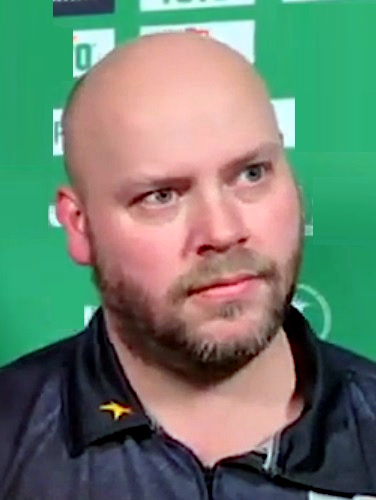
- Kist at the 2023 Dutch Open

Personal information
- Nickname: "The Lipstick"
- Born: 21 April 1986 (age 40) Mariënberg, Netherlands
- Home town: Vroomshoop, Netherlands

Sport
- Sport: Darts
- Playing since: 1998
- Darts: 22g Loxley Darts Signature
- Laterality: Right-handed
- Walk-on music: "Heading Up High" by Armin van Buuren and Kensington

Organisation (see split in darts)
- BDO: 2009–2014
- PDC: 2014–present (Tour Card: 2014–2019, 2025–)
- Current world ranking: (PDC) 80 (5 November 2026)

WDF major events – best performances
- World Championship: Winner (1): 2012
- World Masters: Last 16: 2011
- Finder Masters: Last 24 Group: 2011, 2012
- Dutch Open: Quarter-final: 2024

PDC premier events – best performances
- World Championship: Last 32: 2016
- World Matchplay: Last 32: 2017
- World Grand Prix: Last 32: 2017
- UK Open: Last 16: 2014
- Grand Slam: Quarter-final: 2012
- European Championship: Last 32: 2014, 2015, 2017
- PC Finals: Quarter-final: 2016

Other tournament wins
- Years
NDB Ranking Leek	2010
PDC Challenge Tour	2022, 2023, 2024 (x3)
Spring Cup	2011
WDF Europe Cup Pairs	2012
WDF Europe Cup Team	2012

Christian Kist (born 21 April 1986) is a Dutch professional darts player who competes in Professional Darts Corporation (PDC) events. Nicknamed "the Lipstick", Kist formerly competed in British Darts Organisation (BDO) events. He is a former BDO World Champion, having won the 2012 World Championship, defeating Tony O'Shea in the final.

He switched to the PDC after winning a Tour Card in 2014, and has since finished as runner-up in two Players Championship events. Kist lost his Tour Card at the end of 2019, but has won five titles on the secondary tour, the PDC Challenge Tour. He regained his Tour Card by finishing third on the 2024 Challenge Tour ranking.

He hit a nine-dart finish in his first round match at the 2025 PDC World Darts Championship.

== Career ==
=== BDO ===
Kist reached the last 16 of the 2011 World Masters, where he lost to Tony West 3–2 in a deciding leg having had five darts to win. After that performance he was awarded a wild-card for the Zuiderduin Masters.

Kist qualified for the 2012 BDO World Championship via the International Playoffs. Kist defeated Jan Dekker 3–2 in the first round. He then defeated Belgium's Geert De Vos in the second round 4–2. Kist followed this with a 5–1 quarter-final victory over Alan Norris. Kist then recovered from 5–3 down in the semi-final against two-time champion Ted Hankey, who had one dart at bullseye to win the match 6–5, to reach the final. He played popular crowd favourite Tony O'Shea, who was making his second Lakeside final. Kist went into the break 4–2 up, and later went 6-2 ahead, but O'Shea mounted a comeback taking the next three sets. However, Kist held his nerve to win 7–5 and became the BDO World Champion, the first Dutchman and first qualifier to lift the title since Jelle Klaasen in 2006.

Kist was knocked out in the first round against Robbie Green at the 2013 BDO World Championship. After losing in the first round to James Wilson at the 2014 Championship, Kist announced he would be switching to the Professional Darts Corporation, entering their Qualifying School. Kist played in the 2022 World Masters, reaching the last 32 stage.

During his time in the BDO, he adopted the nickname "The Lipstick", which was suggested by Bobby George for three reasons: Kist's scoring ability in the treble 20 bed–which is sometimes referred to as "the lipstick" due to it being coloured red, his habit of opening his mouth while throwing, and the fact his surname sounds like the word "kissed".

=== PDC ===
At 2014 PDC Q School Kist lost to Matt Padgett in the final of the third day, but finished in the top 24 on the Q-School Order of Merit to seal a two-year PDC Tour Card. His first quarter-final came a month later at the fourth UK Open Qualifier where he lost 6–1 to Jamie Lewis. At the UK Open he saw off Antonio Alcinas 9–2 and survived as Vincent van der Voort missed match darts in three successive legs in the next round to win 9–8. In the fifth round, Kist was beaten 9–6 by Mervyn King. At the third Players Championship, Kist beat James Wade 6–3 to reach his first semi-final on the PDC tour where he missed four match darts against Gary Anderson and went on to lose 6–5. He let 3–1 and 5–3 leads slip in the first round of the European Championship against Mervyn King to lose 6–5. At the Grand Slam he enjoyed 5–2 and 5–1 wins over Andy Hamilton and Richie George to finish second in his group behind Phil Taylor. In the last 16, Kist started well to be 3–0 ahead of Michael Smith, but went on to be eliminated 10–5. Kist was the final qualifier for the Players Championship Finals and missed one dart at the bull to beat Anderson, instead being defeated 6–5 with an average of 100.40 to Anderson's 110.62.

Kist made his debut in the 2015 PDC World Championship after qualifying through the Pro Tour Order of Merit and was knocked out 3–1 in sets by compatriot and fellow former BDO world champion Jelle Klaasen in the first round. After his first year in the PDC he was ranked world number 45. After trailing Ian White 6–0 in the third round of the UK Open, Kist responded to send the match into a deciding leg but lost it to be eliminated 9–8. He lost in the quarter-finals of the second Players Championship 6–4 to Andrew Gilding and went a stage further at the seventh event by knocking out world number one Michael van Gerwen 6–4, but was then beaten 6–1 by Peter Wright in the semis. Kist lost 6–4 in the first round of the European Championship to Rowby-John Rodriguez.

Kist qualified for the 2016 World Championship and punished a poor performance from Justin Pipe to eliminate him 3–0, before losing 4–1 to Dave Chisnall in the second round. He could not win enough matches to qualify for the UK Open, but reached his first quarter-final of the year at the seventh Players Championship event and was beaten 6–1 by Peter Wright. At the 17th event he overcame Gary Anderson, Prakash Jiwa, Kyle Anderson, Dave Chisnall, Justin Pipe and Mensur Suljović to play in his first PDC final, where he lost 6–1 to Michael van Gerwen. 6–4 and 6–2 victories over Ricky Evans and Dimitri Van den Bergh progressed Kist through to the third round of the Players Championship Finals. He then beat Pipe 10–6 to reach his first quarter-final major since joining the PDC and was 8–3 down to Darren Webster, before cutting it back to 8–6, but lost 10–6.

In the first round of the 2017 World Championship, Kist lost six of the final seven legs to be defeated 3–1 by Brendan Dolan.

Kist lost his Tour Card at the end of the 2019 season. His career has been further hampered by injury problems, including arthritis, which have affected his performance and progression in the sport, citing recurring gout in his fingers, elbows, knees and feet.

==== 2024 ====
At the 2024 PDC World Darts Championship, Kist was whitewashed in the first round 3–0 by debutant Luke Littler.

Kist finished in third place on the 2024 PDC Challenge Tour series Order of Merit, winning 3 titles during the season. Connor Scutt and Wesley Plaisier finished first and second respectively on the 2024 Challenge Tour Order of Merit, but both players had already sealed their World Championship qualification via the ProTour Order of Merit. As a result, Kist and Alexander Merkx qualified for the event.

On 18 December 2024, Kist lost to Madars Razma 3–1 in sets in the first round at the 2025 PDC World Championship, but hit a nine-dart finish to win the first set, which earned him £60,000.

== Personal life ==
Kist was a road worker by trade before becoming a professional darts player and is a supporter of AFC Ajax.

== World Championship results ==
=== BDO ===
- 2012: Winner (beat Tony O'Shea 7–5)
- 2013: First round (lost to Robbie Green 1–3)
- 2014: First round (lost to James Wilson 1–3)

=== PDC ===
- 2015: First round (lost to Jelle Klaasen 1–3)
- 2016: Second round (lost to Dave Chisnall 1–4)
- 2017: First round (lost to Brendan Dolan 1–3)
- 2018: First round (lost to Michael van Gerwen 1–3)
- 2024: First round (lost to Luke Littler 0–3)
- 2025: First round (lost to Madars Razma 1–3)

== Career finals ==
=== BDO major finals: 1 (1 title) ===
Legend
World Championship (1–0)

Outcome	No.	Year	Championship	Opponent in the final	Score (Note: (l) = score in legs, (s) = score in sets.)
Winner	1.	2012	World Darts Championship	(England) Tony O'Shea	7–5 (s)

=== WDF major finals: 1 ===
Outcome	No.	Year	Championship	Opponent in the final	Score
Runner-up	1.	2012	Europe Cup Singles	(Scotland) Gary Stone	4–7 (s)

== Performance timeline ==
=== BDO ===
Tournament	2011	2012	2013	2014
BDO Ranked televised events
World Championship	DNP	W	1R	1R
World Masters	6R	4R	3R	PDC

PDC

Tournament	2012	2013	2014	2015	2016	2017	2018	2019	2023	2024	2025	2026
PDC Ranked televised events
World Championship	BDO		DNQ	1R	2R	1R	1R	DNQ		1R	1R	DNQ
World Masters	BDO		Did not qualify								Prel.	Prel.
UK Open	BDO		5R	3R	DNQ	3R	DNQ	4R	DNQ	1R	3R	2R
World Matchplay	BDO		DNQ			1R	Did not qualify					
World Grand Prix	BDO		DNQ			1R	Did not qualify					
European Championship	BDO		1R	1R	DNQ	1R	Did not qualify					
Players Championship Finals	BDO		1R	DNQ	QF	1R	DNQ		1R	DNQ		
PDC Non-ranked televised events
Grand Slam	QF	RR	2R	Did not qualify								
Career statistics
Season-end ranking (PDC)	NR		46	39	38	35	48	97	87	91	131	

==== European Tour ====
Season	1	2	3	4	5	6	7	8	9	10	11	12	13	14
2014	GDC; DNP	DDM; 2R	GDM; DNQ	ADO; 1R	GDT; DNQ	EDO; 1R	EDG; DNQ	EDT; 1R						
2015	GDC; DNP	GDT; DNP	GDM; DNQ	DDM; 2R	IDO; 1R	EDO; 1R	EDT; 2R	EDM; DNQ	EDG; DNQ					
2016	DDM; DNQ	GDM; DNQ	GDT; 2R	EDM; DNQ	ADO; 1R	EDO; 1R	IDO; DNQ	EDT; DNQ	EDG; 1R	GDC; 1R				
2017	GDC; 2R	GDM; DNQ	GDO; 2R	EDG; 1R	GDT; DNQ	EDM; 1R	ADO; 1R	EDO; 2R	DDM; 3R	GDG; DNQ	IDO; 2R	EDT; 1R		
2018	Did not qualify					DDM; 1R	Did not qualify							
2023	Did not qualify								EDG; 1R	EDM; 1R	Did not qualify			
2024	Did not participate						DDC; 1R	Did not participate						
2025	Did not qualify									FDT; 2R	DNQ			GDC; 2R
2026	Did not qualify						IDO; 1R	BDO; 1R	Did not qualify					

==== Players Championships ====
Season	1	2	3	4	5	6	7	8	9	10	11	12	13	14	15	16	17	18	19	20	21	22	23	24	25	26	27	28	29	30	31	32	33	34
2014	BAR; 1R	BAR; QF	CRA; SF	CRA; 2R	WIG; 2R	WIG; 3R	WIG; 1R	WIG; QF	CRA; 2R	CRA; 2R	COV; 4R	COV; 2R	CRA; DNP		DUB; 4R	DUB; 1R	CRA; 1R	CRA; 2R	COV; 1R	COV; 4R														
2015	BAR; 2R	BAR; QF	BAR; 1R	BAR; 1R	BAR; 3R	COV; 1R	COV; SF	COV; 1R	CRA; 1R	CRA; 2R	BAR; 4R	BAR; 1R	WIG; 3R	WIG; 1R	BAR; 3R	BAR; 4R	DUB; 1R	DUB; 4R	COV; DNP															
2016	BAR; 2R	BAR; 1R	BAR; 1R	BAR; 2R	BAR; 2R	BAR; 1R	BAR; QF	COV; 1R	COV; 1R	BAR; 3R	BAR; 1R	BAR; 1R	BAR; 3R	BAR; 4R	BAR; 1R	BAR; 1R	DUB; F	DUB; 1R	BAR; 1R	BAR; QF														
2017	BAR; 2R	BAR; 1R	BAR; 2R	BAR; 4R	MIL; 2R	MIL; 3R	BAR; 2R	BAR; 1R	WIG; 1R	WIG; 3R	MIL; 1R	MIL; 3R	WIG; 2R	WIG; 1R	BAR; 1R	BAR; 4R	BAR; 4R	BAR; 3R	DUB; 1R	DUB; 1R	BAR; 2R	BAR; 1R												
2018	BAR; 1R	BAR; 1R	BAR; 1R	BAR; 2R	MIL; 2R	MIL; 1R	BAR; 1R	BAR; 2R	WIG; 2R	WIG; 1R	MIL; 3R	MIL; 3R	WIG; 1R	WIG; 1R	BAR; 2R	BAR; 1R	BAR; 1R	BAR; 2R	DUB; 1R	DUB; 1R	BAR; 2R	BAR; 1R												
2019	WIG; 1R	WIG; 1R	WIG; 1R	WIG; 4R	BAR; DNP		WIG; 2R	WIG; 2R	BAR; 2R	BAR; 2R	BAR; 2R	BAR; 2R	BAR; QF	BAR; 1R	BAR; 1R	BAR; 2R	WIG; 2R	WIG; 1R	BAR; 4R	BAR; 4R	HIL; 1R	HIL; 1R	BAR; 1R	BAR; 1R	BAR; 1R	BAR; 1R	DUB; 1R	DUB; 2R	BAR; 2R	BAR; 1R				
2020 (Note: Not a Tour card holder)	Did not play																																	
2021	Did not participate								NIE; 3R	NIE; 3R	NIE; 2R	NIE; 2R	Did not participate																					
2022	Did not participate																								BAR; 1R	BAR; 1R	BAR; 1R	BAR; 2R	BAR; DNP					
2023	BAR; DNP		BAR; 1R	BAR; 2R	BAR; DNP		HIL; 1R	HIL; 2R	WIG; 1R	WIG; 4R	LEI; DNP		HIL; 2R	HIL; SF	LEI; 2R	LEI; 4R	Did not participate					BAR; F	BAR; SF	BAR; 4R	BAR; 1R	BAR; 1R	BAR; 2R	BAR; 1R	BAR; 1R	BAR; 1R				
2024	Did not participate														MIL; 1R	MIL; 3R	MIL; 1R	MIL; 2R	MIL; 3R	WIG; 1R	WIG; 4R	MIL; SF	MIL; 1R	WIG; 3R	WIG; 1R	WIG; QF	WIG; 2R	WIG; 2R	LEI; 1R	LEI; 1R				
2025	WIG; 2R	WIG; 1R	ROS; 1R	ROS; 2R	LEI; 4R	LEI; 2R	HIL; 1R	HIL; 1R	LEI; 2R	LEI; 1R	LEI; 1R	LEI; 2R	ROS; 1R	ROS; 2R	HIL; 2R	HIL; 1R	LEI; 1R	LEI; 1R	LEI; 1R	LEI; 1R	LEI; 1R	HIL; 1R	HIL; 2R	MIL; 1R	MIL; 1R	HIL; 1R	HIL; 1R	LEI; 2R	LEI; 1R	LEI; 2R	WIG; 1R	WIG; 1R	WIG; 2R	WIG; 1R
2026	HIL; 1R	HIL; 1R	WIG; DNP		LEI; QF	LEI; QF	LEI; 1R	LEI; 3R	WIG; 2R	WIG; 3R	MIL; 2R	MIL; 2R	HIL; 3R	HIL; 1R	LEI; 1R	LEI; 3R	LEI; 4R	LEI; 1R	MIL; 1R	MIL; 1R	WIG; 2R	WIG; 1R	LEI; QF	LEI; 2R	HIL; QF	HIL; 2R	HIL; 1R	HIL; 1R	ROS; 1R	ROS; 1R	ROS; 2R	ROS; 2R	LEI; 1R	LEI; 1R

Performance Table Legend
W	Won the tournament	F	Finalist	SF	Semifinalist	QF	Quarterfinalist	#R; RR; Prel.	Lost in # round Round-robin; Preliminary round	DQ	Disqualified
DNQ	Did not qualify	DNP	Did not participate	WD	Withdrew	NH	Tournament not held	#R; RR; Prel.	Lost in # round Round-robin; Preliminary round	NYF	Not yet founded

== Nine-dart finishes ==
Christian Kist's televised nine-dart finishes
Date	Opponent	Tournament	Method	Prize
18 December 2024	(Latvia) Madars Razma	2025 PDC World Darts Championship	3 x T20; 3 x T20; T20, T19, D12	£60,000
