= 2014 European Darts Trophy =

Tournament information
- Dates: 19–21 September 2014
- Venue: Kohlrabizirkus
- Location: Leipzig
- Country: Germany
- Organisation(s): PDC
- Format: Legs
- Prize fund: £100,000
- Winner's share: £20,000
- High checkout: 167 (Wales) Gerwyn Price

Champion(s)
- (England) Michael Smith

The 2014 European Darts Trophy was the eighth of eight PDC European Tour events on the 2014 PDC Pro Tour. The tournament took place at the Kohlrabizirkus in Leipzig, Germany, between 19–21 September 2014. It featured a field of 48 players and £100,000 in prize money, with £20,000 going to the winner.

After finishing second in the previous European Tour event, Michael Smith won his first European Tour event by beating Michael van Gerwen 6–5 in the final. This tournament ended the 2014 PDC European Tour, with a different winner in each of the eight events.

== Prize money ==
Stage (num. of players)		Prize money
Winner	(1)	£20,000
Runner-up	(1)	£8,000
Semi-finalists	(2)	£4,000
Quarter-finalists	(4)	£3,000
Third round losers	(8)	£2,000
Second round losers	(16)	£1,250
First round losers	(16)	£1,000
Total	£100,000	

== Qualification and format ==
The top 16 players from the PDC ProTour Order of Merit on 30 June 2014 automatically qualified for the event. The remaining 32 places went to players from three qualifying events - 20 from the UK Qualifier (held in Coventry on 4 July), eight from the European Qualifier and four from the Host Nation Qualifier (both held at the venue the day before the event started).

Gary Anderson, Phil Taylor, Robert Thornton and Adrian Lewis withdrew from the tournament, therefore the highest-ranked qualifiers - Terry Jenkins, Michael Smith, Andy Hamilton and Wes Newton - become seeded players. To complete the field of 48 players, two additional places in the draw were made available in the European Qualifier and the Home Nation Qualifier. All seeds receive a bye into the second round.

The following players took part in the tournament:

Top 16
1. (Netherlands) Michael van Gerwen (runner-up)
2. (Northern Ireland) Brendan Dolan (third round)
3. (England) Dave Chisnall (second round)
4. (Scotland) Peter Wright (quarter-finals)
5. (England) Ian White (third round)
6. (Belgium) Kim Huybrechts (third round)
7. (England) Steve Beaton (second round)
8. (Australia) Simon Whitlock (quarter-finals)
9. (England) Mervyn King (second round)
10. (Netherlands) Vincent van der Voort (third round)
11. (England) Justin Pipe (quarter-finals)
12. (England) Jamie Caven (second round)
13. (England) Terry Jenkins (third round)
14. (England) Michael Smith (winner)
15. (England) Andy Hamilton (semi-finals)
16. (England) Wes Newton (third round)

UK Qualifier
- (England) Ronnie Baxter (first round)
- (England) Stephen Bunting (first round)
- (Wales) Richie Burnett (first round)
- (England) Ricky Evans (first round)
- (England) Andrew Gilding (second round)
- (England) James Hubbard (first round)
- (Northern Ireland) Mickey Mansell (first round)
- (Canada) Shaun Narain (second round)
- (Republic of Ireland) William O'Connor (second round)
- (England) Kevin Painter (second round)
- (Wales) Gerwyn Price (quarter-finals)
- (England) Andy Smith (second round)
- (England) Ross Smith (second round)
- (England) James Wade (first round)
- (England) Steve West (second round)
- (England) Dean Winstanley (semi-finals)

European Qualifier
- (Belgium) Ronny Huybrechts (second round)
- (Austria) Mensur Suljović (first round)
- (Austria) Roxy-James Rodriguez (third round)
- (Netherlands) Gino Vos (first round)
- (Netherlands) Raymond van Barneveld (second round)
- (Netherlands) Christian Kist (first round)
- (Netherlands) Jelle Klaasen (third round)
- (Netherlands) Ryan de Vreede (second round)
- (Belgium) Dimitri Van den Bergh (first round)
- (Netherlands) Dirk van Duijvenbode (first round)

Host Nation Qualifier
- (Germany) Bernd Roith (first round)
- (Germany) Max Hopp (first round)
- (Germany) Michael Hurtz (second round)
- (Germany) Jyhan Artut (second round)
- (Germany) Tomas Seyler (first round)
- (Germany) Michael Rosenauer (first round)

== Draw ==
First round (best of 11 legs); 19 September
(England) Stephen Bunting 93.02	3
(England) Ross Smith 95.84	6
(England) Kevin Painter 80.20	6
(England) James Hubbard 80.51	5
(England) Steve West 82.90	6
(Germany) Michael Rosenauer 75.63	1
(Netherlands) Jelle Klaasen 89.33	6
(England) Ricky Evans 90.92	5
(Netherlands) Raymond van Barneveld 89.77	6
(Northern Ireland) Mickey Mansell 87.52	5
(England) Dean Winstanley 84.53	6
(Netherlands) Gino Vos 82.93	4
(England) Ronnie Baxter 93.16	4
(Germany) Michael Hurtz 86.76	6
(Netherlands) Christian Kist 83.81	5
(Canada) Shaun Narain 85.13	6
(England) James Wade 91.38	4
(England) Andy Smith 91.67	6
(Wales) Richie Burnett 91.73	5
(Belgium) Ronny Huybrechts 94.77	6
(Wales) Gerwyn Price 83.11	6
(Germany) Bernd Roith 82.38	3
(Netherlands) Ryan de Vreede 80.79	6
(Germany) Max Hopp 80.52	5
(England) Andrew Gilding 104.20	6
(Belgium) Dimitri Van den Bergh 88.82	2
(Austria) Mensur Suljović 104.03	4
(Republic of Ireland) William O'Connor 104.36	6
(Germany) Tomas Seyler 64.70	2
(Austria) Roxy-James Rodriguez 73.50	6
(Germany) Jyhan Artut 96.76	6
(Netherlands) Dirk van Duijvenbode 85.34	2

Second round (best of 11 legs); 20 September
1	(Netherlands) Michael van Gerwen 87.93	6
(England) Ross Smith 82.27	3
16	(England) Wes Newton 97.11	6
(England) Kevin Painter 92.16	3
8	(Australia) Simon Whitlock 92.95	6
(England) Steve West 85.31	5
9	(England) Mervyn King 87.40	3
(Netherlands) Jelle Klaasen 97.22	6
5	(England) Ian White 99.57	6
(Netherlands) Raymond van Barneveld 96.96	4
12	(England) Jamie Caven 94.01	3
(England) Dean Winstanley 90.51	6
4	(Scotland) Peter Wright 92.58	6
(Germany) Michael Hurtz 76.71	1
13	(England) Terry Jenkins 100.49	6
(Canada) Shaun Narain 82.64	2
2	(Northern Ireland) Brendan Dolan 93.69	6
(England) Andy Smith 96.65	4
15	(England) Andy Hamilton 89.39	6
(Belgium) Ronny Huybrechts 88.12	4
7	(England) Steve Beaton 95.95	3
(Wales) Gerwyn Price 99.89	6
10	(Netherlands) Vincent van der Voort 96.28	6
(Netherlands) Ryan de Vreede 79.20	1
6	(Belgium) Kim Huybrechts 98.89	6
(England) Andrew Gilding 95.78	5
11	(England) Justin Pipe 92.56	6
(Republic of Ireland) William O'Connor 88.87	5
3	(England) Dave Chisnall 81.12	4
(Austria) Roxy-James Rodriguez 83.03	6
14	(England) Michael Smith 104.50	6
(Germany) Jyhan Artut 94.29	2

Third round (best of 11 legs); 21 September
1	(Netherlands) van Gerwen 97.04	6
16	(England) Newton 85.98	3
8	(Australia) Whitlock 97.89	6
(Netherlands) Klaasen 91.39	3
5	(England) White 87.56	2
(England) Winstanley 94.63	6
4	(Scotland) Wright 93.91	6
13	(England) Jenkins 93.24	1
2	(Northern Ireland) Dolan 87.60	5
15	(England) Hamilton 88.79	6
(Wales) Price 89.16	6
10	(Netherlands) van der Voort 89.89	5
6	(Belgium) K. Huybrechts 86.37	4
11	(England) Pipe 87.57	6
(Austria) Rodriguez 82.73	1
14	(England) M. Smith 88.16	6

Quarter-finals (best of 11 legs); 21 September
1	(Netherlands) van Gerwen 100.17	6
8	(Australia) Whitlock 93.21	1
(England) Winstanley 92.70	6
4	(Scotland) Wright 87.88	3
15	(England) Hamilton 88.36	6
(Wales) Price 84.11	3
11	(England) Pipe 93.93	4
14	(England) M. Smith 98.77	6

Semi-finals (best of 11 legs); 21 September
1	(Netherlands) van Gerwen 104.24	6
(England) Winstanley 98.63	2
15	(England) Hamilton 81.72	4
14	(England) M. Smith 80.88	6

Final (best of 11 legs); 21 September
1	(Netherlands) van Gerwen 93.49	5
14	(England) M. Smith 94.36	6
