= 2014 European Darts Open =

Tournament information
- Dates: 11–13 July 2014
- Venue: Maritim Hotel
- Location: Düsseldorf
- Country: Germany
- Organisation(s): PDC
- Format: Legs
- Prize fund: £100,000
- Winner's share: £20,000

Champion(s)
- (Scotland) Peter Wright

The 2014 European Darts Open was the sixth of eight PDC European Tour events on the 2014 PDC Pro Tour. The tournament took place at the Maritim Hotel in Düsseldorf, Germany, between 11 and 13 July 2014. It featured a field of 48 players and £100,000 in prize money, with £20,000 going to the winner.

Peter Wright won his first European Tour event by beating Simon Whitlock 6–2 in the final.

== Prize money ==
Stage (num. of players)		Prize money
Winner	(1)	£20,000
Runner-up	(1)	£8,000
Semi-finalists	(2)	£4,000
Quarter-finalists	(4)	£3,000
Third round losers	(8)	£2,000
Second round losers	(16)	£1,250
First round losers	(16)	£1,000
Total	£100,000	

== Qualification and format ==
The top 16 players from the PDC ProTour Order of Merit on 4 June 2014 automatically qualified for the event. The remaining 32 places went to players from three qualifying events - 20 from the UK Qualifier (held in Coventry on 13 June), eight from the European Qualifier and four from the Host Nation Qualifier (both held at the venue the day before the event started).

The following players took part in the tournament:

Top 16
1. (Netherlands) Michael van Gerwen (third round)
2. (Scotland) Gary Anderson (semi-finals)
3. (Northern Ireland) Brendan Dolan (third round)
4. (Scotland) Robert Thornton (second round)
5. (Scotland) Peter Wright (winner)
6. (England) Dave Chisnall (quarter-finals)
7. (England) Ian White (second round)
8. (Belgium) Kim Huybrechts (third round)
9. (England) Steve Beaton (second round)
10. (England) Adrian Lewis (third round)
11. (England) Mervyn King (third round)
12. (England) Justin Pipe (third round)
13. (England) Andy Hamilton (quarter-finals)
14. (Australia) Simon Whitlock (runner-up)
15. (England) Wes Newton (third round)
16. (England) Jamie Caven (quarter-finals)

UK Qualifier
- (England) Michael Smith (second round)
- (England) Kevin Painter (semi-finals)
- (England) Ronnie Baxter (first round)
- (Wales) Jamie Lewis (second round)
- (England) Stephen Bunting (second round)
- (England) Dean Winstanley (first round)
- (England) Darren Webster (second round)
- (Scotland) Gary Stone (first round)
- (England) James Wade (quarter-finals)
- (England) Keegan Brown (first round)
- (Wales) Gerwyn Price (second round)
- (England) Johnny Haines (first round)
- (England) Andy Smith (third round)
- (England) Jay Foreman (first round)
- (Republic of Ireland) William O'Connor (first round)
- (England) Dennis Smith (second round)
- (England) Chris Aubrey (first round)
- (England) Darren Johnson (second round)
- (England) Colin Lloyd (first round)
- (England) Mark Dudbridge (second round)

European Qualifier
- (Netherlands) Jelle Klaasen (first round)
- (Netherlands) Ryan de Vreede (second round)
- (Netherlands) Christian Kist (first round)
- (Austria) Rowby-John Rodriguez (second round)
- (Austria) Mensur Suljović (first round)
- (Netherlands) Raymond van Barneveld (second round)
- (Belgium) Ronny Huybrechts (first round)
- (Netherlands) Benito van de Pas (second round)

Host Nation Qualifier
- (Germany) Michael Hurtz (first round)
- (Germany) Arman Ertür (first round)
- (Germany) Martin Schindler (first round)
- (Germany) Michael Rosenauer (second round)

== Draw ==
First round (best of 11 legs); 11 July
(England) Jay Foreman 93.89	4
(England) Mark Dudbridge 101.06	6
(Germany) Michael Hurtz 76.52	2
(England) Stephen Bunting 87.64	6
(Netherlands) Ryan de Vreede 82.71	6
(Scotland) Gary Stone 86.55	4
(England) Kevin Painter 100.20	6
(England) Keegan Brown 84.55	0
(England) Dean Winstanley 86.35	2
(England) Michael Smith 96.53	6
(Germany) Arman Ertür 82.30	5
(Austria) Rowby-John Rodriguez 88.24	6
(England) Johnny Haines 92.74	1
(England) Andy Smith 96.42	6
(England) Ronnie Baxter 91.85	5
(England) Darren Webster 86.65	6
(Wales) Gerwyn Price 98.32	6
(England) Colin Lloyd 87.44	2
(England) Dennis Smith 101.24	6
(Republic of Ireland) William O'Connor 87.67	4
(Netherlands) Christian Kist 89.78	5
(England) James Wade 91.73	6
(Belgium) Ronny Huybrechts 79.97	0
(Netherlands) Benito van de Pas 98.02	6
(Germany) Michael Rosenauer 87.03	6
(Austria) Mensur Suljović 85.55	5
(England) Darren Johnson 97.94	6
(Netherlands) Jelle Klaasen 92.62	2
(Wales) Jamie Lewis 96.98	6
(England) Chris Aubrey 79.44	1
(Germany) Martin Schindler 82.41	3
(Netherlands) Raymond van Barneveld 95.98	6

Second round (best of 11 legs); 12 July
1	(Netherlands) Michael van Gerwen 102.31	6
(England) Mark Dudbridge 92.18	2
16	(England) Jamie Caven 92.54	6
(England) Stephen Bunting 91.32	4
8	(Belgium) Kim Huybrechts 96.89	6
(Netherlands) Ryan de Vreede 84.32	1
9	(England) Steve Beaton 93.26	2
(England) Kevin Painter 99.24	6
5	(Scotland) Peter Wright 111.29	6
(England) Michael Smith 90.53	1
12	(England) Justin Pipe 91.74	6
(Austria) Rowby-John Rodriguez 88.95	2
4	(Scotland) Robert Thornton 92.58	4
(England) Andy Smith 89.31	6
13	(England) Andy Hamilton 85.37	6
(England) Darren Webster 82.55	2
2	(Scotland) Gary Anderson 92.46	6
(Wales) Gerwyn Price 85.73	3
15	(England) Wes Newton 90.98	6
(England) Dennis Smith 91.63	5
7	(England) Ian White 97.70	3
(England) James Wade 100.13	6
10	(England) Adrian Lewis 105.19	6
(Netherlands) Benito van de Pas 96.33	5
6	(England) Dave Chisnall 93.05	6
(Germany) Michael Rosenauer 83.63	2
11	(England) Mervyn King 95.44	6
(England) Darren Johnson 93.88	3
3	(Northern Ireland) Brendan Dolan 93.15	6
(Wales) Jamie Lewis 94.95	5
14	(Australia) Simon Whitlock 99.27	6
(Netherlands) Raymond van Barneveld 90.10	4

Third round (best of 11 legs); 13 July
1	(Netherlands) van Gerwen 105.36	4
16	(England) Caven 104.16	6
8	(Belgium) K. Huybrechts 82.77	2
(England) Painter 85.31	6
5	(Scotland) Wright 97.73	6
12	(England) Pipe 81.96	2
(England) A. Smith 94.76	5
13	(England) Hamilton 92.38	6
2	(Scotland) Anderson 103.79	6
15	(England) Newton 91.04	3
(England) Wade 103.46	6
10	(England) A. Lewis 99.66	4
6	(England) Chisnall 90.20	6
11	(England) King 87.16	5
3	(Northern Ireland) Dolan 94.55	2
14	(Australia) Whitlock 101.64	6

Quarter-finals (best of 11 legs); 13 July
16	(England) Caven 83.41	2
(England) Painter 90.28	6
5	(Scotland) Wright 93.80	6
13	(England) Hamilton 86.39	2
2	(Scotland) Anderson 97.00	6
(England) Wade 98.53	5
6	(England) Chisnall 92.10	3
14	(Australia) Whitlock 92.76	6

Semi-finals (best of 11 legs); 13 July
(England) Painter 101.01	5
5	(Scotland) Wright 96.38	6
2	(Scotland) Anderson 95.56	5
14	(Australia) Whitlock 95.58	6

Final (best of 11 legs); 13 July
5	(Scotland) Wright 98.97	6
14	(Australia) Whitlock 91.62	2
