= Justin Pipe =

English darts player (born 1971)

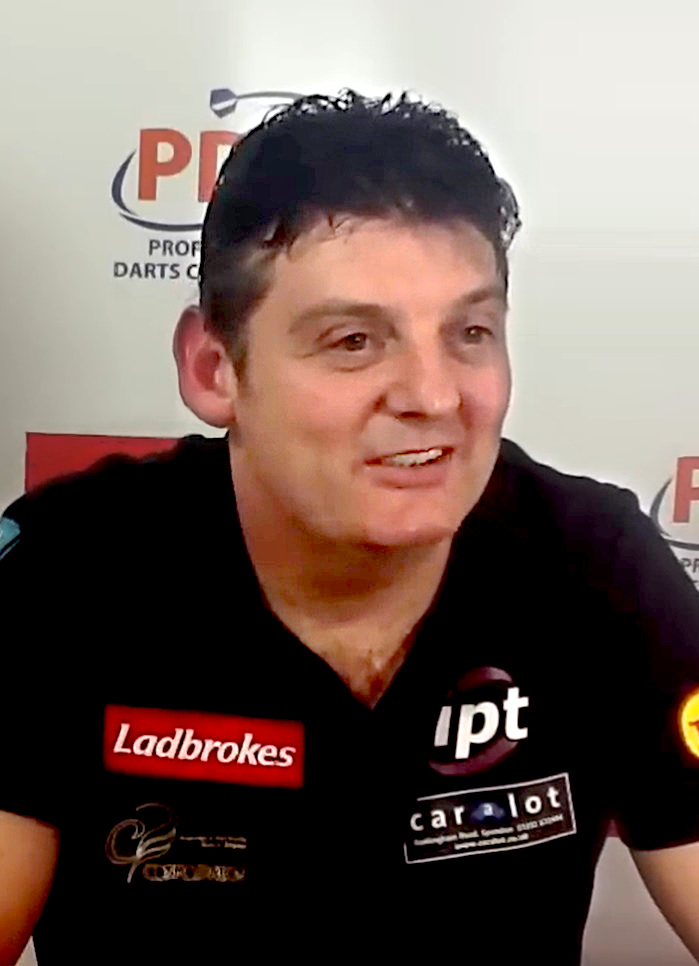
- Pipe in 2011

Personal information
- Nickname: "The Force"
- Born: 9 November 1971 (age 55) Taunton, Somerset, England

Sport
- Sport: Darts
- Playing since: 2007
- Darts: 24g Bull's NL Signature
- Laterality: Right-handed
- Walk-on music: "Back in Black" by AC/DC

Organisation (see split in darts)
- PDC: 2008–2021 (Tour Card: 2011–2021)

PDC premier events – best performances
- World Championship: Last 16: 2012
- World Matchplay: Quarter-final: 2012, 2013
- World Grand Prix: Semi-final: 2013
- UK Open: Last 32: 2012, 2016
- Grand Slam: Group Stage: 2010, 2011, 2013, 2020
- European Championship: Last 16: 2013, 2015
- PC Finals: Semi-final: 2012, 2013, 2017
- Masters: Quarter-final: 2014

Other tournament wins
- Years
Kingswood Darts Open	2009
European Tour Events
Austrian Darts Open	2012
Players Championships (x5)
2011 (x3), 2012, 2014

Other achievements
- 2012 PDPA Players' Player of the Year.

Justin Pipe (born 9 November 1971) is an English former professional darts player who competed in Professional Darts Corporation (PDC) events from 2008 to 2021. Nicknamed "The Force", he won six PDC ranking titles, comprising five Players Championships and the inaugural Austrian Darts Open on the PDC European Tour. His best televised results included a semi-final appearance at the 2013 World Grand Prix and three semi-finals at the Players Championship Finals (2012, 2013 and 2017).

== Playing career ==
=== Early career (2008–2010) ===
Pipe played darts when he was younger but concentrated on his work as a tree surgeon for many years. A former amateur boxer, he avoided playing in smoke-filled pubs because cigarette smoke irritated his eyes. Following the introduction of the smoking ban in England in 2007, he returned to competitive darts.

Pipe made his first appearance at a televised PDC major as a pub qualifier at the 2008 UK Open, where he defeated Geoff Wylie and Lionel Sams before losing 9–3 to James Wade. He reached the third round again in 2009, losing 9–5 to Andy Jenkins. In 2010, he qualified for the Grand Slam of Darts through the ITV Wildcard qualifier, but was eliminated in the group stage after defeats to Wade, Vincent van der Voort and Tony O'Shea.

=== Breakthrough and major success (2011–2013) ===
Pipe made his World Championship debut at the 2011 event, losing 3–1 to Mark Walsh. He made his World Matchplay debut later that year, defeating Mervyn King in the opening round. In June, he achieved a nine-dart finish against Colin Osborne at a Players Championship in Nuland. His first PDC ranking title came in October, when he defeated Phil Taylor 6–5 in a Players Championship final in Dublin. He won a further two Players Championship titles that year and finished top of the 2011 Players Championship Order of Merit.

At the 2012 World Championship, Pipe defeated Sean Reed and came from two sets down to beat Wes Newton 4–3, reaching the last 16 for the first time. He then lost 4–1 to Terry Jenkins. In January 2012, Pipe received the PDPA Players' Player of the Year award for his performances during the previous season.

Pipe opened the 2012 Players Championship season with a 6–0 final victory over Paul Nicholson. In April, he won the first tournament in PDC European Tour history, the 2012 Austrian Darts Open, beating Raymond van Barneveld in the semi-finals and Wade 6–3 in the final. The victory took him into the top 16 of the PDC Order of Merit for the first time. He reached the quarter-finals of the 2012 World Matchplay and the World Grand Prix. At the 2012 Players Championship Finals, Pipe advanced to his first televised major semi-final, losing 11–6 to Kim Huybrechts.

In 2013, Pipe reached a second consecutive World Matchplay quarter-final, defeating Mark Webster and Van Barneveld before losing 16–10 to Taylor. At the World Grand Prix, victories over Andy Smith, Adrian Lewis and Andy Hamilton took him to the semi-finals, where he lost 5–2 to Dave Chisnall. He also reached the semi-finals of the 2013 Players Championship Finals, losing 10–4 to Taylor.

=== Later tour career (2014–2017) ===
Pipe reached the final of the 2014 German Darts Championship, but lost 6–5 to Gary Anderson despite having led 5–3 and missed six match darts. Later that year, he claimed his fifth Players Championship title at the 15th event of the season, defeating Lewis in the semi-finals and reigning world champion Michael van Gerwen in the final, both in deciding legs. He also reached the quarter-finals of the Masters.

In June 2015, Pipe reached the final of the 2015 Dutch Darts Masters, where he lost 6–0 to Van Gerwen. He lost in the first round of the 2015 World Championship to Laurence Ryder and of the 2016 edition to Christian Kist. In 2016, he reached the fourth round of the 2016 UK Open and the semi-finals of the final Players Championship event of the season, where he lost a deciding leg to Benito van de Pas.

At the 2017 Players Championship Finals, Pipe defeated Daryl Gurney 10–9 in the quarter-finals to reach his third semi-final at the event, where he lost 11–3 to Van Gerwen.

=== Final years and loss of Tour Card (2018–2022) ===
During the 2018 PDC World Darts Championship, Pipe defeated Bernie Smith 3–2 in the first round after Smith missed match darts. The match attracted controversy when Pipe was seen coughing while Smith was attempting to finish the deciding leg. Pipe denied deliberately attempting to distract his opponent. The Darts Regulation Authority subsequently fined him £3,000 for gamesmanship and bringing the sport into disrepute. He lost 4–0 to Taylor in the second round.

Pipe's results declined in the following seasons, although he reached the final of Players Championship 19 in July 2019, losing 8–5 to Peter Wright. He returned to the World Championship at the 2020 edition, defeating Benjamin Pratnemer 3–2 in the first round before losing 3–0 to Gurney. Later in 2020, he qualified for the 2020 Grand Slam of Darts, where he lost all three group matches against Rob Cross, Luke Humphries and Chisnall.

Pipe withdrew from the 2021 UK Open after testing positive for COVID-19 before the tournament. He lost his PDC Tour Card at the end of the 2021 season and did not enter the PDC Qualifying School in January 2022 while recovering from an arm injury. He did not subsequently return to the professional PDC circuit.

== Playing style ==
Pipe was known for his deliberate and unusually slow throwing action, which he partly attributed to a serious road accident in 1993 that left his right arm paralysed for three months. During his recovery, he had to relearn how to move his arm and shoulder, developing a methodical throwing technique.

== Management and sponsorship ==
Pipe signed a sponsorship agreement with Cosmo Darts in October 2011. From January 2015, he was managed by his own group, "Team Pipe", which included members of his family and his friend Krispy Brown.

== Personal life ==
Pipe is from Taunton, Somerset. Before becoming a professional darts player, he worked as a tree surgeon. He is married to Claire, and they have two sons and a daughter. His brother Mark died in June 2013; Pipe subsequently dedicated a victory at the European Championship to him.

== World Championship results ==
=== PDC ===
- 2011: First round (lost to Mark Walsh 1–3)
- 2012: Third round (lost to Terry Jenkins 1–4)
- 2013: Second round (lost to Mark Walsh 2–4)
- 2014: Second round (lost to Devon Petersen 1–4)
- 2015: First round (lost to Laurence Ryder 2–3)
- 2016: First round (lost to Christian Kist 0–3)
- 2017: First round (lost to Chris Dobey 1–3)
- 2018: Second round (lost to Phil Taylor 0–4)
- 2020: Second round (lost to Daryl Gurney 0–3)

== Performance timeline ==
=== PDC ===
Tournament	2008	2009	2010	2011	2012	2013	2014	2015	2016	2017	2018	2019	2020	2021
PDC Ranked televised events
World Championship	DNQ			1R	3R	2R	2R	1R	1R	1R	2R	DNQ	2R	DNQ
UK Open	3R	3R	2R	3R	4R	1R	3R	3R	4R	3R	3R	3R	3R	WD
World Matchplay	DNQ			2R	QF	QF	1R	1R	1R	2R	DNQ	1R	1R	DNQ
World Grand Prix	DNQ			1R	QF	SF	1R	2R	DNQ	1R	Did not qualify			
European Championship	DNQ			1R	1R	2R	1R	2R	1R	Did not qualify				
Grand Slam of Darts	DNQ		RR	RR	DNQ	RR	Did not qualify						RR	DNQ
Players Championship Finals	Not held	DNQ		2R	SF	SF	1R	1R	3R	SF	DNQ	1R	DNQ	
PDC Non-ranked televised events
The Masters	Not held					1R	QF	Did not qualify						
Championship League Darts	Did not participate				RR	RR	Not held							
Career statistics
Year-end ranking	325	93	48	22	10	12	16	21	26	26	42	55	49	89

==== PDC European Tour ====
Season	1	2	3	4	5	6	7	8	9	10	11	12	13
2012	ADO; W	GDC; QF	EDO; 1R	GDM; 1R	DDM; 1R								
2013	UKM; 1R	EDT; QF	EDO; QF	ADO; 1R	GDT; 2R	GDC; 3R	GDM; 2R	DDM; 1R					
2014	GDC; F	DNQ	GDM; 2R	ADO; 2R	GDT; 3R	EDO; 3R	EDG; 2R	EDT; QF					
2015	GDC; QF	GDT; 3R	GDM; 2R	DDM; F	IDO; QF	EDO; 3R	EDT; 3R	EDM; 3R	EDG; 2R				
2016	DDM; 3R	GDM; 2R	GDT; 2R	DNQ	ADO; 1R	DNQ		EDT; 2R	DNQ	GDC; 3R			
2017	DNQ	GDM; 1R	DNQ		GDT; 1R	EDM; 2R	ADO; 1R	EDO; 1R	DDM; 1R	DNQ	IDO; 1R	DNQ	
2018	EDO; 3R	Did not qualify							EDM; QF	GDC; 1R	DNQ		
2019	EDO; QF	Did not qualify							CDO; 2R	ADC; 1R	DNQ	IDO; 2R	GDT; 1R
2020	BDC; 1R	DNQ											
2021	DNQ												

==== PDC Players Championships ====
Season	1	2	3	4	5	6	7	8	9	10	11	12	13	14	15	16	17	18	19	20	21	22	23	24	25	26	27	28	29	30	31	32	33	34	35	36	37
2008	Did not participate													BLA; 1R	Did not participate							NEW; 1R	NEW; 1R	DNP		IRV; 3R	DNP			LEI; 2R	LEI; 2R						
2009	DON; 2R	DNP		GLA; 1R	GLA; 1R	DNP	WIG; 3R	BRE; 4R	Did not participate					NEW; QF	BAR; 1R	BAR; 4R	DIN; 2R	DIN; 4R	Did not participate					SAL; 4R	SAL; 1R	DUB; 3R	DUB; 2R	KIL; 3R	NUL; 2R	NUL; 1R	IRV; 2R	IRV; 1R					
2010	GIB; 1R	GIB; 2R	SWI; 1R	DER; 2R	GLA; 2R	GLA; 2R	WIG; 1R	CRA; 3R	BAR; 3R	DER; 1R	WIG; 2R	DNP	SAL; 2R	SAL; 2R	BAR; SF	BAR; 4R	HAA; 3R	HAA; QF	LVE; 3R	LVE; 1R	LVE; 3R	DNP	ONT; 4R	ONT; 3R	CRA; 1R	CRA; 2R	NUL; 4R	NUL; QF	DUB; SF	DUB; 2R	KIL; 4R	BAD; 3R	BAD; 3R	BAR; 4R	BAR; 2R	DER; SF	DER; 1R
2011	HAL; 3R	HAL; 3R	DER; 3R	DER; 2R	CRA; 3R	CRA; SF	VIE; 3R	VIE; SF	CRA; 2R	CRA; 3R	BAR; QF	BAR; 2R	NUL; 3R	NUL; 3R	ONT; QF	ONT; QF	DER; 4R	DER; 3R	NUL; 4R	NUL; 4R	DUB; 4R	DUB; W	KIL; W	GLA; F	GLA; 2R	ALI; 2R	ALI; 4R	CRA; W	CRA; SF	WIG; 3R	WIG; SF						
2012	ALI; W	ALI; F	REA; 2R	REA; 1R	CRA; QF	CRA; F	BIR; 3R	BIR; QF	CRA; 3R	CRA; QF	BAR; QF	BAR; QF	DUB; 3R	DUB; 2R	KIL; 2R	KIL; 2R	CRA; QF	CRA; 4R	BAR; 1R	BAR; 1R																	
2013	WIG; 1R	WIG; 3R	WIG; SF	WIG; 4R	CRA; 3R	CRA; 3R	BAR; 3R	BAR; 1R	DUB; SF	DUB; 3R	KIL; 4R	KIL; 4R	DNP		BAR; QF	BAR; 3R																					
2014	BAR; 4R	BAR; 1R	CRA; 4R	CRA; 3R	WIG; 1R	WIG; 3R	WIG; 4R	WIG; 4R	CRA; F	CRA; SF	COV; 1R	COV; 3R	CRA; 3R	CRA; 1R	DUB; W	DUB; QF	CRA; 3R	CRA; 4R	COV; 1R	COV; 3R																	
2015	BAR; 3R	BAR; 3R	BAR; 4R	BAR; 3R	BAR; 1R	COV; 1R	COV; 4R	COV; 2R	CRA; 3R	CRA; 1R	BAR; 3R	BAR; 1R	WIG; 3R	WIG; 1R	BAR; 2R	BAR; 1R	DUB; 1R	DUB; 4R	COV; 4R	COV; 1R																	
2016	BAR; 4R	BAR; 1R	BAR; 3R	BAR; 2R	BAR; 2R	BAR; 1R	BAR; 1R	COV; 4R	COV; QF	BAR; 1R	BAR; 2R	BAR; 1R	BAR; 1R	BAR; QF	BAR; 3R	BAR; 1R	DUB; QF	DUB; QF	BAR; 1R	BAR; SF																	
2017	BAR; 2R	BAR; 1R	BAR; 4R	BAR; 1R	MIL; 3R	MIL; 1R	BAR; 3R	BAR; 2R	WIG; 3R	WIG; 4R	MIL; 1R	MIL; 4R	WIG; 2R	WIG; 3R	BAR; SF	BAR; 2R	BAR; QF	BAR; 3R	DUB; 3R	DUB; 3R	BAR; 3R	BAR; 3R															
2018	BAR; 1R	BAR; 1R	BAR; 1R	BAR; 1R	MIL; 2R	MIL; 2R	BAR; 2R	BAR; 3R	WIG; 1R	WIG; 3R	MIL; 2R	MIL; 1R	WIG; 1R	WIG; 1R	BAR; 2R	BAR; 2R	BAR; 1R	BAR; 1R	DUB; 1R	DUB; 1R	BAR; 2R	BAR; 1R															
2019	WIG; 1R	WIG; 1R	WIG; 2R	WIG; 1R	BAR; 1R	BAR; 1R	WIG; 1R	WIG; 1R	BAR; 3R	BAR; 4R	BAR; 1R	BAR; 4R	BAR; QF	BAR; 2R	BAR; 4R	BAR; 2R	WIG; 3R	WIG; 2R	BAR; F	BAR; 3R	HIL; 3R	HIL; 1R	BAR; 3R	BAR; QF	BAR; QF	BAR; 2R	DUB; 3R	DUB; 2R	BAR; 1R	BAR; 1R							
2020	BAR; 1R	BAR; 2R	WIG; 1R	WIG; 1R	WIG; 2R	WIG; 2R	BAR; 1R	BAR; 4R	MIL; 2R	MIL; 1R	MIL; 1R	DNP		NIE; 1R	NIE; 1R	NIE; 2R	NIE; 2R	NIE; 1R	COV; 1R	COV; 4R	COV; 3R	COV; 2R	COV; 1R														
2021	BOL; 1R	BOL; 3R	BOL; 3R	BOL; 2R	MIL; 1R	MIL; 1R	MIL; 1R	MIL; 1R	NIE; 2R	NIE; 1R	NIE; 1R	NIE; 1R	MIL; 3R	MIL; 2R	MIL; 1R	MIL; 1R	COV; 1R	COV; 1R	COV; 1R	COV; 1R	BAR; 1R	BAR; 1R	Did not participate														

Performance Table Legend
W	Won the tournament	F	Finalist	SF	Semifinalist	QF	Quarterfinalist	#R; RR; Prel.	Lost in # round Round-robin; Preliminary round	DQ	Disqualified
DNQ	Did not qualify	DNP	Did not participate	WD	Withdrew	NH	Tournament not held	#R; RR; Prel.	Lost in # round Round-robin; Preliminary round	NYF	Not yet founded
