= 2014 Sydney Darts Masters =

Tournament information
- Dates: 28–30 August 2014
- Venue: Hordern Pavilion
- Location: Moore Park, Sydney
- Country: Australia
- Organisation(s): PDC
- Format: Legs; Final – best of 21
- Prize fund: £73,000
- Winner's share: £20,000
- High checkout: 167 (Australia) Kyle Anderson

Champion(s)
- (England) Phil Taylor

The 2014 Sydney Darts Masters was the second staging of a tournament by the Professional Darts Corporation, as a fourth and final entry in the 2014 World Series of Darts. The tournament took place at Hordern Pavilion, Sydney, Australia, between 28–30 August 2014. The tournament featured eight top PDC players and eight qualifiers competing in a knockout system.

Phil Taylor retained his title by beating Stephen Bunting 11–3 in the final.

== Prize money ==
The total prize fund was £73,000.

Position (no. of players)		Prize money (Total: £73,000)
Winner	(1)	£20,000
Runner-up	(1)	£10,000
Semi-finalists	(2)	£7,500
Quarter-finalists	(4)	£5,000
First round	(8)	£1,000

== Qualifiers ==
The eight PDC players (with the top 4 seed) were:

1. (Netherlands) Michael van Gerwen (first round)
2. (England) Phil Taylor (winner)
3. (Australia) Simon Whitlock (quarter-finals)
4. (Scotland) Peter Wright (quarter-finals)
5. (England) Dave Chisnall (quarter-finals)
6. (England) James Wade (semi-finals)

The two PDC wildcards were:

- (Netherlands) Raymond van Barneveld (first round)
- (England) Stephen Bunting (runner-up)

The regional qualifiers were:

Qualification	Player
Australian World Cup Representative	(Australia) Paul Nicholson (first round)
New Zealand Number 1 Ranked Player	(New Zealand) Warren Parry (quarter-finals)
2014 DPA Australian Grand Prix Order of Merit 1st Place	(Australia) Laurence Ryder (first round)
2014 DPA Australian Grand Prix Order of Merit 2nd Place	(Australia) Shane Tichowitsch (first round)
2014 DPA Australian Grand Prix Order of Merit 3rd Place	(Australia) David Platt (first round)
2014 DPA Australian Grand Prix Order of Merit 4th Place	(Australia) John Weber (first round)
Winner of DPA Qualifier 1	(Australia) Kyle Anderson (semi-finals)
Winner of DPA Qualifier 2	(Australia) Damon Heta (first round)

== Draw ==
First round (best of 11 legs); 28 August
1	(Netherlands) Michael van Gerwen 91.56	5
(New Zealand) Warren Parry 84.07	6
(England) James Wade 85.02	6
(Australia) Shane Tichowitsch 79.13	1
4	(Scotland) Peter Wright 94.93	6
(Australia) Laurence Ryder 72.52	0
(England) Stephen Bunting 100.93	6
(Australia) John Weber 92.20	1
2	(England) Phil Taylor 102.85	6
(Australia) Paul Nicholson 86.28	2
(England) Dave Chisnall 103.66	6
(Australia) Damon Heta 84.32	0
3	(Australia) Simon Whitlock 93.52	6
(Australia) David Platt 90.10	2
(Netherlands) Raymond van Barneveld 96.47	5
(Australia) Kyle Anderson 98.66	6

Quarter-finals (best of 15 legs); 29 August
(New Zealand) Warren Parry 85.32	2
(England) James Wade 94.97	8
4	(Scotland) Peter Wright 90.94	6
(England) Stephen Bunting 90.61	8
2	(England) Phil Taylor 110.36	8
(England) Dave Chisnall 101.59	2
3	(Australia) Simon Whitlock 94.07	3
(Australia) Kyle Anderson 92.25	8

Semi-finals (best of 19 legs); 30 August
(England) James Wade 97.72	4
(England) Stephen Bunting 98.33	10
2	(England) Phil Taylor 106.76	10
(Australia) Kyle Anderson 94.52	4

Final (best of 21 legs); 30 August
(England) Stephen Bunting 93.18	3
2	(England) Phil Taylor 97.08	11

== Broadcasting ==
The tournament was available in the following countries on these channels:

Country	Channel
Australia	Fox Sports
New Zealand	Sky Sport (New Zealand)
Asia	Fox Channel Asia
United Kingdom	Challenge
Netherlands	RTL 7
