= 2015 Dutch Darts Masters =

Tournament information
- Dates: 5–7 June 2015
- Venue: Evenementenhal
- Location: Venray, Netherlands
- Organisation(s): Professional Darts Corporation (PDC)
- Format: Legs
- Prize fund: £115,000
- Winner's share: £25,000
- High checkout: 170 Michael van Gerwen

Champion(s)
- Michael van Gerwen (NED)

The 2015 Dutch Darts Masters was the fourth of nine PDC European Tour events on the 2015 PDC Pro Tour. The tournament took place at the Evenementenhal, Venray, from 5 to 7 June 2015. It featured a field of 48 players and £115,000 in prize money, with £25,000 going to the winner.

Michael van Gerwen won the tournament for the second year in a row after beating Justin Pipe 6–0 in the final.

== Prize money ==
The prize fund was increased to £115,000 after being £100,000 for the previous two years.

Stage (num. of players)		Prize money
Winner	(1)	£25,000
Runner-up	(1)	£10,000
Semi-finalists	(2)	£5,000
Quarter-finalists	(4)	£3,500
Third round losers	(8)	£2,000
Second round losers	(16)	£1,500
First round losers	(16)	£1,000
Total	£115,000	

== Qualification and format ==
The top 16 players from the PDC ProTour Order of Merit on 8 March 2015 automatically qualified for the event and were seeded in the second round. The remaining 32 places went to players from three qualifying events - 20 from the UK Qualifier (held in Barnsley on 13 March), eight from the European Qualifier and four from the Host Nation Qualifier (both held at the venue the day before the event started. The following players took part in the tournament:

Top 16
1. (Netherlands) Michael van Gerwen (winner)
2. (England) Michael Smith (third round)
3. (England) James Wade (second round)
4. (Scotland) Peter Wright (second round)
5. (Northern Ireland) Brendan Dolan (third round)
6. (England) Ian White (third round)
7. (Netherlands) Vincent van der Voort (second round)
8. (Australia) Simon Whitlock (third round)
9. (England) Mervyn King (quarter-finals)
10. (England) Justin Pipe (runner-up)
11. (Belgium) Kim Huybrechts (quarter-finals)
12. (England) Terry Jenkins (semi-finals)
13. (England) Steve Beaton (third round)
14. (England) Jamie Caven (semi-finals)
15. (England) Stephen Bunting (second round)
16. (England) Dave Chisnall (third round)

UK Qualifier
- (England) Dean Winstanley (first round)
- (Scotland) Gary Stone (second round)
- (Republic of Ireland) William O'Connor (second round)
- (England) Alan Norris (first round)
- (England) Darren Webster (first round)
- (India) Prakash Jiwa (first round)
- (England) Wes Newton (first round)
- (Wales) Jonny Clayton (first round)
- (England) Ricky Evans (second round)
- (Scotland) John Henderson (second round)
- (Wales) Gerwyn Price (first round)
- (Australia) Kyle Anderson (quarter-finals)
- (England) Joe Cullen (first round)
- (England) Nathan Aspinall (third round)
- (England) Jamie Robinson (first round)
- (England) Josh Payne (quarter-finals)
- (Northern Ireland) Daryl Gurney (first round)
- (England) Wayne Jones (first round)
- (England) Brett Claydon (first round)
- (England) David Pallett (third round)

European Qualifier
- (Belgium) Davyd Venken (first round)
- (Spain) Cristo Reyes (first round)
- (Austria) Mensur Suljović (second round)
- (Belgium) Dimitri Van den Bergh (first round)
- (Austria) Rowby-John Rodriguez (second round)
- (Greece) John Michael (second round)
- (Belgium) Kenny Neyens (first round)
- (Germany) Max Hopp (second round)

Host Nation Qualifier
- (Netherlands) Christian Kist (second round)
- (Netherlands) Jerry Hendriks (second round)
- (Netherlands) Jeffrey de Zwaan (second round)
- (Netherlands) Jelle Klaasen (second round)

== Draw ==
First round (best of 11 legs); 5 June
(Austria) Mensur Suljović 98.14	6
(Wales) Jonny Clayton 96.60	4
(Netherlands) Jelle Klaasen 94.72	6
(England) Alan Norris 91.16	4
(Wales) Gerwyn Price 89.01	5
(Germany) Max Hopp 88.21	6
(England) Darren Webster 97.29	3
(England) Ricky Evans 103.06	6
(Netherlands) Christian Kist 95.25	6
(Spain) Cristo Reyes 90.00	4
(England) Wes Newton 90.45	3
(Netherlands) Jerry Hendriks 92.83	6
(Australia) Kyle Anderson 89.31	6
(Belgium) Kenny Neyens 89.49	2
(England) Dean Winstanley 92.15	3
(Scotland) Gary Stone 99.86	6
(Northern Ireland) Daryl Gurney 89.52	5
(Greece) John Michael 83.54	6
(England) Wayne Jones 93.86	3
(England) Josh Payne 94.73	6
(England) Nathan Aspinall 82.82	6
(England) Jamie Robinson 80.43	5
(Austria) Rowby-John Rodriguez 90.57	6
(Belgium) Davyd Venken 87.50	2
(England) Joe Cullen 84.51	3
(Netherlands) Jeffrey de Zwaan 95.48	6
(Republic of Ireland) William O'Connor 87.00	6
(England) Brett Claydon 73.73	2
(England) David Pallett 95.38	6
(Belgium) Dimitri Van den Bergh 90.33	4
(Scotland) John Henderson 91.01	6
(India) Prakash Jiwa 86.64	4

Second round (best of 11 legs); 6 June
1	(Netherlands) Michael van Gerwen 103.09	6
(Austria) Mensur Suljović 95.21	2
16	(England) Dave Chisnall 100.34	6
(Netherlands) Jelle Klaasen 98.51	5
8	(Australia) Simon Whitlock 95.30	6
(Germany) Max Hopp 93.90	3
9	(England) Mervyn King 97.40	6
(England) Ricky Evans 97.60	1
5	(Northern Ireland) Brendan Dolan 84.96	6
(Netherlands) Christian Kist 82.43	1
12	(England) Terry Jenkins 89.08	6
(Netherlands) Jerry Hendriks 85.19	3
4	(Scotland) Peter Wright 89.56	2
(Australia) Kyle Anderson 87.45	6
13	(England) Steve Beaton 96.50	6
(Scotland) Gary Stone 96.63	5
2	(England) Michael Smith 96.86	6
(Greece) John Michael 85.03	1
15	(England) Stephen Bunting 90.00	4
(England) Josh Payne 89.01	6
7	(Netherlands) Vincent van der Voort 82.94	5
(England) Nathan Aspinall 83.60	6
10	(England) Justin Pipe 90.83	6
(Austria) Rowby-John Rodriguez 87.56	5
6	(England) Ian White 92.71	6
(Netherlands) Jeffrey de Zwaan 86.76	4
11	(Belgium) Kim Huybrechts 97.32	6
(Republic of Ireland) William O'Connor 98.44	5
3	(England) James Wade 88.82	4
(England) David Pallett 91.52	6
14	(England) Jamie Caven 87.55	6
(Scotland) John Henderson 83.91	0

Third round (best of 11 legs); 7 June
1	(Netherlands) van Gerwen 114.70	6
16	(England) Chisnall 103.81	3
8	(Australia) Whitlock 87.84	5
9	(England) King 89.93	6
5	(Northern Ireland) Dolan 94.11	4
12	(England) Jenkins 88.50	6
(Australia) Anderson 100.36	6
13	(England) Beaton 95.94	1
2	(England) Smith 100.53	4
(England) Payne 95.42	6
(England) Aspinall 88.45	4
10	(England) Pipe 83.17	6
6	(England) White 102.39	3
11	(Belgium) Huybrechts 106.02	6
(England) Pallett 93.11	5
14	(England) Caven 89.15	6

Quarter-finals (best of 11 legs); 7 June
1	(Netherlands) van Gerwen 101.96	6
9	(England) King 89.77	4
12	(England) Jenkins 91.57	6
(Australia) Anderson 98.34	5
(England) Payne 91.47	4
10	(England) Pipe 92.90	6
11	(Belgium) Huybrechts 88.85	2
14	(England) Caven 86.01	6

Semi-finals (best of 11 legs); 7 June
1	(Netherlands) van Gerwen 104.90	6
12	(England) Jenkins 105.86	5
10	(England) Pipe 87.46	6
14	(England) Caven 90.10	4

Final (best of 11 legs); 7 June
1	(Netherlands) van Gerwen 100.20	6
10	(England) Pipe 87.62	0
