= John Weber (darts player) =

Australian darts player

Personal information
- Nickname: "T-Rex"
- Born: 29 November 1972 (age 53) Melbourne, Australia

Sport
- Sport: Darts
- Playing since: 1992
- Darts: 24g Puma Shot!
- Laterality: Left-handed
- Walk-on music: "Walk the Dinosaur" by Was (Not Was)

Organisation (see split in darts)
- PDC: 2008–2018

PDC premier events – best performances
- World Championship: Last 64: 2015

Other tournament wins
- Years
Australian Masters	2016
Ettamogah Harrows Australian Grand Prix	2015
Harrows Australian GP	2015
Mittagong RSL Open	2014
Oceanic Masters	2014
Southern Illawarra Open	2014
Victorian Easter Open	2011
Warilla Bowls Club Open	2014, 2015

John Weber (born 29 November 1972) is an Australian former professional darts player.

== Career ==
In 2011, Weber won his first title by claiming the Victorian Easter Open with a 7–2 victory over Jamie Browne in the final. In 2014 he began playing more in Australian Grand Prix Tour events, winning the Mittagong RSL Open 1, Southern Illawarra Open 1 and Warilla Bowls Club Open. Weber qualified for the Sydney Darts Masters and lost 6–1 to Stephen Bunting in the first round. He took the first five legs against Rob Szabo in the final of the Oceanic Masters and won 8–2. The title earned him a place in the first round of the 2015 World Championship, where he lost 3–1 against Terry Jenkins in the first round.

Weber won three times on the 2015 Australian Grand Prix Pro Tour, as well as losing in five finals to finish second on the Order of Merit. In 2016 he was defeated 6–5 in the final of the Chester Hill Open by Corey Cadby and won the Australian Masters by beating James Bailey.

Weber his playing for the World Inclusio ParaDarts since August 2026.

== World Championship performances results ==
=== PDC ===
- 2015: First round: (lost to Terry Jenkins 1–3) (sets)
