= Laurence Ryder =

Australian darts player

Loz Ryder
Personal information
- Full name: Laurence Ryder
- Nicknames: "Loz" "The Warrior"
- Born: 28 December 1966 (age 59) Derby, England
- Home town: Perth, Australia

Sport
- Sport: Darts
- Playing since: 1994
- Darts: 21g Shot Signature
- Laterality: Right-handed
- Walk-on music: "Warrior" by Havana Brown

Organisation (see split in darts)
- BDO: 2016–2020
- PDC: 2012–2022

PDC premier events – best performances
- World Championship: Last 32: 2015

Other tournament wins
- Years
Auckland Masters Qualifier	2015
Dosh Perth Open	2013, 2014
Ettamogah Harrows Australian Grand Prix	2015
Kirribilli Club Open	2014
Queensland Open	2015
Victoria Open	2014
Warilla Bowls Club Open	2014
West Coast Classic	2014

Laurence "Loz" Ryder (born 28 December 1966) is an Australian former professional darts player who has competed in the British Darts Organisation (BDO) events.

== Career ==
Ryder was born in Britain but in 2001 moved from Derby to Western Australia. In 2013 he won the Dosh Perth Open by beating Conan Ugle 6–3 in the final. Ryder played the full circuit of Australian Grand Prix events for the first time in 2014 and won five events as well as being the runner-up in five others to top the rankings. As a result, he qualified for the Perth Darts Masters and Sydney Darts Masters, losing in the opening rounds to Raymond van Barneveld and Peter Wright respectively.

His top ranking also ensured him a debut at the PDC World Darts Championship in 2015. He won six successive legs from 2–1 down in sets against world number 17 Justin Pipe to beat him 3–2. However, in the following round against Terry Jenkins he lost all 12 legs played in a 4–0 defeat. Two titles in the first half of the year saw him play in the Perth Darts Masters and Sydney Darts Masters as the number one player on the DPA Order of Merit. Defeats to Adrian Lewis and Peter Wright saw him knocked out in the first round of both events for the second year in a row. He also played in the Auckland Darts Masters, but was whitewashed 6–0 by Raymond van Barneveld in the opening round.

Ryder topped the Order of Merit for the second successive year to qualify for the 2016 World Championship, but he could only take two legs during his first round match with Vincent van der Voort in a 3–0 defeat. He lost 6–2 to Corey Cadby in the final of the Victoria Open.

Ryder his playing with the World Inclusio ParaDarts since August 2026.

== Family ==
Ryder's grandfather Arthur Groves and uncle John Groves were both professional footballers.

== World Championship performances results ==
=== PDC ===
- 2015: Second round: (lost to Terry Jenkins 0–4) (sets)
- 2016: First round: (lost to Vincent van der Voort 0–3)
