= Shane Tichowitsch =

Australian darts player

Personal information
- Nickname: "TNT"
- Born: 9 January 1967 (age 59) Bundaberg, Australia
- Home town: Bundaberg, Australia

Sport
- Sport: Darts
- Playing since: 1987
- Darts: 24g Dennis Priestley Winmau
- Laterality: Left-handed
- Walk-on music: "T.N.T." by AC/DC

Organisation (see split in darts)
- BDO: 2005–2007
- PDC: 2008–2016, 2019–2021

WDF major events – best performances
- World Trophy: Last 56: 2007
- Int. Darts League: Preliminary round: 2007

PDC premier events – best performances
- World Championship: Last 64: 2011, 2013

Other tournament wins
- Years
Billabong Tavern Darts Open	2012
Cabbage Tree Hotel Open	2012
Coogee Bay Classic	2010
Dosh DPA Kazco Open	2012, 2012
DPA Australian Singles	2008
Gaels Club Open	2010
Goulburn Open	2010
Mittagong RSL Open	2014
NDDA Open	2014, 2014
Queensland Open	2010
Redcliffe Darts Open	2012
Revesby Workers Club Open	2010
Russell Stewart Classic	2010, 2012
SID Darts Open	2012
South Australian Open	2012, 2012
Southern Illawarra Open	2014

Shane Tichowitsch (born 9 January 1967) is an Australian former professional darts player.

== Career ==
Tichowitsch qualified for the 2011 PDC World Darts Championship. He is a semi-professional darts player and has been as high as 93 in the world. He qualified for the 2011 PDC World Darts Championship, however he was defeated 1–3 by Andy Smith in the last 64 of the competition.

In 2012, Tichowitsch won four successive events on the DartPlayers Australia tour, later finishing top of the Order of Merit and therefore returned to the World Championship in its 2013 edition. He lost to Dave Chisnall 0–3 in the first round, but his performance did not reflect the scoreline, with Chisnall admitting Tichowitsch deserved more out of the game. Tichowitsch averaged 92.07 and took out finishes of 161 and 144 against the world number 12.

In 2014, Tichowitsch won four events on the Australian Darts Tour and also qualified for the Perth Darts Masters (losing 6–2 to Paul Nicholson in the first round) and the Sydney Darts Masters (losing 6–1 to James Wade in the first round). Tichowitsch could only reach one final in 2015 which came at the Dosh Balcatta, but he lost 6–2 to Beau Anderson.

== World Championship performances ==
=== PDC ===
- 2011: First round (lost to Andy Smith 1–3) (sets)
- 2013: First round (lost to Dave Chisnall 0–3)
