= Rob Modra =

Australian darts player (born 1972)

Personal information
- Nickname: "The Remedy"
- Born: 13 May 1972 (age 54) Adelaide, Australia
- Home town: Melbourne, Australia

Sport
- Sport: Darts
- Playing since: 1992
- Darts: 23 Gram Unicorn
- Laterality: Right-handed
- Walk-on music: "Holy Grail" by Hunters & Collectors

Organisation (see split in darts)
- BDO: 2007–2016
- PDC: 2016–

WDF major events – best performances
- World Championship: Last 40: 2016
- World Masters: Last 264: 2008

Other tournament wins
- Years
Australian Ch'ship	2011
Australian Masters	2012
Australian Open	2011
Billabong Tavern Darts Open	2010
Boorowa Open	2012
Central Coast Australian Classic	2010
Coogee Bay Classic	2010
Criterion Hotel Open	2010
DPA Australian Matchplay	2014, 2015
DPA South Australia Bubble	2021 (x4)
Geelong Open	2011
Golden Nugget Classic	2014
NDDA Open	2009
Pacific Masters	2012
Queensland Open	2010
Robina Gold Coast Open	2011
Victoria Open	2014, 2015
Victorian Easter Open	2010, 2012
Medal record
Men's Darts
Representing Australia
WDF Asia-Pacific Cup
Gold medal – first place	2012 Darwin	Men's pairs
Gold medal – first place	2012 Darwin	Team event

Rob Modra (born 13 May 1972) is an Australian professional darts player who competes in Professional Darts Corporation (PDC) events.

== Career ==
He failed to win a PDC Pro Tour Card at the 2016 Qualifying School. He reached the final of the second event in 2016, gaining £1,000.

== World Championship results ==
=== BDO ===
- 2016: Preliminary Round (lost to John Walton 0–3) (sets)
