= Jyhan Artut =

German darts player

Personal information
- Nickname: The Eagle
- Born: 9 October 1976 (age 50) Holzminden, West Germany
- Home town: Hannover, Germany

Sport
- Sport: Darts
- Playing since: 1995
- Darts: 22g bulls
- Laterality: Right-handed
- Walk-on music: "Can't Stop" by Red Hot Chili Peppers

Organisation (see split in darts)
- BDO: 2003–2007
- PDC: 2007–

WDF major events – best performances
- World Masters: Last 192: 2003

PDC premier events – best performances
- World Championship: Last 32: 2010
- UK Open: Last 64: 2013
- European Championship: Last 32: 2014

Other tournament wins
- Years
GDC Ramada Hotel Koln	2009 (x2)

Jyhan Artut (born 9 October 1976) is a German professional darts player who competes in Professional Darts Corporation (PDC) events.

== Career ==
Artut defeated Wayne Mardle 3–0 in the 2010 PDC World Darts Championship in the first round. He was beaten 4–1 by Robert Thornton in the second round. He won the German Championship in 2009 and 2010. With the latter win he qualified for the PDC World Darts Championship for his second consecutive year.

In the 2011 PDC World Darts Championship, Artut played against Scott MacKenzie of Hong Kong in the preliminary round and defeated him 4–3 before going on to lose to Denis Ovens 3–1 in the first round.

He qualified for the 2012 PDC World Darts Championship through the European Order of Merit and was drawn to play Gary Anderson in the first round. Artut was involved in one of the most exciting first round matches ever seen at the World Championships. He won the opening two sets, but was quickly pulled back to 2–2 to require a deciding set. Artut missed four darts to win the match in the 10th leg of the set and Anderson eventually won with a sudden death leg. Artut represented Germany with Bernd Roith in the 2012 PDC World Cup of Darts and together they were beaten 1–3 by the United States in the second round. In October, Artut beat Jann Hoffmann to qualify for the fifth European Tour Event of the year, the Dutch Darts Masters, where he lost to world number five Wes Newton 4–6 in the first round. In an attempt to reach the 2013 World Championship, Artut was defeated in the quarter-finals of the Central European Qualifier 5–6 by Mensur Suljović.

Artut entered 2013 ranked world number 71, out of the top 64 who retain their places on the PDC tour. Therefore, he played in Q School in an attempt to win a tour card on the circuit for two years and succeeded on the first day, defeating Vernon Sheppard 6–3 in his final match. Artut played in his third World Cup of Darts and second with Andree Welge in February and they qualified from Group F with 5–3 wins over Finland and the USA. The home nation then saw off Poland 5–2 and played the Finnish duo of Jani Haavisto and Jarkko Komula in the quarter-finals. Artut beat Haavisto 4–1, but Welge lost to Komula meaning that a doubles match was required to settle the tie. Germany came from 1–3 down to level at 3–3 but lost the deciding leg to exit the tournament. Artut's best performance in an individual event in 2013 came in April at the sixth UK Open Qualifier, where he was beaten 6–1 by John Bowles in the quarter-finals. At the UK Open he lost 9–5 to Kim Huybrechts in the third round. Artut qualified for five of the eight European Tour events but his only win was a 6–3 success over David Pallett at the German Darts Championship, before being knocked out 6–1 by Andy Hamilton in the second round. He was ranked 13th on the European Order of Merit which saw him miss out on qualification for the 2014 World Championship by just £500.

Artut was beaten 5–2 by Alan Derrett in the opening round of the 2014 UK Open. Artut and Welge lost 5–3 to South Africa in the first round of the World Cup of Darts. In October, Artut reached only his second semi-final in a PDC event at the 18th Players Championship of 2014 with wins over Steve Grubb, Ron Meulenkamp, Chris Aubrey, Steve Beaton and Ian White, before losing 6–4 to world number one Michael van Gerwen. He qualified for the European Championship and was knocked out in the first round 6–4 by Dave Chisnall.

Artut qualified for the 2015 World Championship through the Pro Tour Order of Merit and fell 2–0 down in sets without winning a leg against Phil Taylor in the first round. He sent the third set into a deciding leg but lost it to be beaten 3–0. Artut rose to a career high world ranking of number 48 after the event. Artut partnered Max Hopp for the first time at the World Cup and they defeated India and Austria to reach the quarter-finals, where they lost both their singles matches against England. He reached the main draw of five European Tour events, but his only win came at the European Darts Open by beating Stephen Bunting 6–3. He averaged 104.14 in the second round against Kim Huybrechts, but lost 6–4. Artut's consistent qualification in these events saw him reach the 2016 World Championship through the European Order of Merit and he lost 3–0 to Bunting in the first round, missing two darts to extend the match in the final set.

Artut was knocked out in the first round of the three European Tour tournament he qualified for in 2016. His sole last 16 appearance of the year was at the second Players Championship event by beating Dave Chisnall 6–5, but he lost 6–4 to Joe Cullen. Artut and Max Hopp were defeated 5–3 by Australia in the opening round of the World Cup.

Artut made his European Tour comeback at the 2019 European Darts Open in Leverkusen, where he lost 6–4 to Wesley Plaisier in the first round. He also qualified for both of the next two European Tour events, but lost 6-0 to Boris Koltsov in Hildesheim and 6-2 to Josh Payne in Munich, averaging only 81, 75 and 82 in his three matches.

== World Championship results ==
=== PDC ===
- 2010: Second round (lost to Robert Thornton 1–4)
- 2011: First round (lost to Denis Ovens 1–3)
- 2012: First round (lost to Gary Anderson 2–3)
- 2015: First round (lost to Phil Taylor 0–3)
- 2016: First round (lost to Stephen Bunting 0–3)
