= 2015 German Darts Championship =

Tournament information
- Dates: 13–15 February 2015
- Venue: Halle 39
- Location: Hildesheim, Germany
- Organisation(s): Professional Darts Corporation (PDC)
- Format: Legs
- Prize fund: £115,000
- Winner's share: £25,000
- High checkout: 167; Ian White; Michael van Gerwen

Champion(s)
- Michael van Gerwen (NED)

The 2015 German Darts Championship was the first of nine PDC European Tour events on the 2015 PDC Pro Tour. The tournament took place at Halle 39, Hildesheim, Germany, from 13 to 15 February 2015. It featured a field of 48 players and £115,000 in prize money, with £25,000 going to the winner.

Gary Anderson was the defending champion, having beaten Justin Pipe 6–5 in the 2014 tournament's final, and in this year's final Michael van Gerwen won the title by beating Anderson 6–2.

== Prize money ==
The prize fund was increased to £115,000 after being £100,000 for the previous two years.

Stage (num. of players)		Prize money
Winner	(1)	£25,000
Runner-up	(1)	£10,000
Semi-finalists	(2)	£5,000
Quarter-finalists	(4)	£3,500
Third round losers	(8)	£2,000
Second round losers	(16)	£1,500
First round losers	(16)	£1,000
Total	£115,000	

== Qualification and format ==
The top 16 players from the PDC ProTour Order of Merit on the 16 January 2015 automatically qualified for the event. The remaining 32 places went to players from three qualifying events - 20 from the UK Qualifier (held in Wigan on 18 January), eight from the European Qualifier (held in Bielefeld on 24 January) and four from the Host Nation Qualifier (held at the venue the day before the event started).

Bernd Roith withdrew from the event so Andy Smith received a bye to Round 2.

The following players took part in the tournament:

Top 16
1. (Scotland) Gary Anderson (runner-up)
2. (Netherlands) Michael van Gerwen (winner)
3. (England) Michael Smith (third round)
4. (Scotland) Peter Wright (third round)
5. (England) James Wade (third round)
6. (Scotland) Robert Thornton (quarter-finals)
7. (Northern Ireland) Brendan Dolan (third round)
8. (England) Mervyn King (third round)
9. (England) Justin Pipe (quarter-finals)
10. (England) Ian White (second round)
11. (Australia) Simon Whitlock (third round)
12. (Netherlands) Vincent van der Voort (quarter-finals)
13. (England) Adrian Lewis (semi-finals)
14. (Belgium) Kim Huybrechts (second round)
15. (England) Stephen Bunting (third round)
16. (England) Steve Beaton (third round)

UK Qualifier
- (England) Terry Jenkins (second round)
- (England) James Wilson (second round)
- (England) John Bowles (second round)
- (England) Chris Aubrey (first round)
- (England) Jamie Caven (first round)
- (South Africa) Devon Petersen (first round)
- (England) Stuart Kellett (second round)
- (England) Andy Boulton (second round)
- (England) John Scott (first round)
- (England) Ricky Williams (second round)
- (England) Andy Smith (second round)
- (Wales) Kevin Thomas (first round)
- (England) Joe Murnan (quarter-finals)
- (England) Joe Cullen (first round)
- (England) Pete Dyos (second round)
- (England) Andy Parsons (second round)
- (England) Kevin McDine (first round)
- (Canada) John Part (first round)
- (England) Ross Smith (second round)
- (England) Michael Barnard (first round)

European Qualifier
- (Netherlands) Jelle Klaasen (second round)
- (Netherlands) Jeffrey de Zwaan (second round)
- (Netherlands) Mareno Michels (first round)
- (Netherlands) Ryan de Vreede (first round)
- (Austria) Mensur Suljović (semi-finals)
- (Belgium) Ronny Huybrechts (second round)
- (Netherlands) Benito van de Pas (first round)
- (Spain) Cristo Reyes (first round)

Host Nation Qualifier
- (Germany) Sascha Stein (first round)
- (Austria) Maik Langendorf (second round)
- (Germany) ~~Bernd Roith (withdrew)~~
- (Germany) Daniel Zygla (first round)

== Draw ==
First round (best of 11 legs); 13 February
(Canada) John Part 79.13	1
(England) Ricky Williams 82.59	6
(England) John Bowles 94.95	6
(England) Chris Aubrey 79.52	2
(England) Andy Smith	w/o
(Germany) Bernd Roith	w/d
(England) Joe Cullen 98.30	5
(England) Andy Boulton 94.53	6
(England) Terry Jenkins 102.48	6
(Netherlands) Ryan de Vreede 79.14	0
(England) Kevin McDine 93.34	5
(England) James Wilson 93.83	6
(England) Ross Smith 91.28	6
(Wales) Kevin Thomas 86.91	4
(South Africa) Devon Petersen 80.41	2
(Netherlands) Jeffrey de Zwaan 87.82	6
(England) Jamie Caven 91.01	2
(Netherlands) Jelle Klaasen 97.89	6
(England) Stuart Kellett 83.55	6
(Germany) Daniel Zygla 80.97	4
(Belgium) Ronny Huybrechts 85.25	6
(Netherlands) Mareno Michels 81.58	5
(England) Joe Murnan 89.58	6
(England) Michael Barnard 80.77	5
(Germany) Sascha Stein 76.73	4
(England) Andy Parsons 77.26	6
(Austria) Maik Langendorf 76.62	6
(England) John Scott 71.55	3
(Netherlands) Benito van de Pas 82.77	3
(England) Pete Dyos 81.99	6
(Austria) Mensur Suljović 89.15	6
(Spain) Cristo Reyes 89.85	2

Second round (best of 11 legs); 14 February
1	(Scotland) Gary Anderson 98.37	6
(England) Ricky Williams 91.24	5
16	(England) Steve Beaton 91.97	6
(England) John Bowles 87.33	3
8	(England) Mervyn King 94.15	6
(England) Andy Smith 90.49	5
9	(England) Justin Pipe 87.35	6
(England) Andy Boulton 85.67	2
5	(England) James Wade 99.95	6
(England) Terry Jenkins 92.65	3
12	(Netherlands) Vincent van der Voort 95.42	6
(England) James Wilson 90.93	1
4	(Scotland) Peter Wright 91.96	6
(England) Ross Smith 95.59	5
13	(England) Adrian Lewis 98.02	6
(Netherlands) Jeffrey de Zwaan 83.62	0
2	(Netherlands) Michael van Gerwen 94.45	6
(Netherlands) Jelle Klaasen 89.00	3
15	(England) Stephen Bunting 86.71	6
(England) Stuart Kellett 84.82	0
7	(Northern Ireland) Brendan Dolan 97.67	6
(Belgium) Ronny Huybrechts 88.76	2
10	(England) Ian White 98.94	4
(England) Joe Murnan 99.72	6
6	(Scotland) Robert Thornton 85.12	6
(England) Andy Parsons 85.47	4
11	(Australia) Simon Whitlock 87.82	6
(Austria) Maik Langendorf 82.47	1
3	(England) Michael Smith 92.75	6
(England) Pete Dyos 85.92	4
14	(Belgium) Kim Huybrechts 98.11	4
(Austria) Mensur Suljović 96.85	6

Third round (best of 11 legs); 15 February
1	(Scotland) Anderson 98.52	6
16	(England) Beaton 102.00	2
8	(England) King 88.56	2
9	(England) Pipe 99.13	6
5	(England) Wade 95.00	4
12	(Netherlands) van der Voort 100.89	6
4	(Scotland) Wright 100.00	2
13	(England) Lewis 108.35	6
2	(Netherlands) van Gerwen 94.93	6
15	(England) Bunting 84.27	0
7	(Northern Ireland) Dolan 97.09	4
(England) Murnan 89.54	6
6	(Scotland) Thornton 96.06	6
11	(Australia) Whitlock 92.21	4
3	(England) M. Smith 94.15	4
(Austria) Suljović 92.01	6

Quarter-finals (best of 11 legs); 15 February
1	(Scotland) Anderson 99.10	6
9	(England) Pipe 89.66	0
12	(Netherlands) van der Voort 92.26	4
13	(England) Lewis 93.48	6
2	(Netherlands) van Gerwen 103.42	6
(England) Murnan 93.50	4
6	(Scotland) Thornton 86.26	3
(Austria) Suljović 89.98	6

Semi-finals (best of 11 legs); 15 February
1	(Scotland) Anderson 94.10	6
13	(England) Lewis 90.73	2
2	(Netherlands) van Gerwen 98.16	6
(Austria) Suljović 87.76	1

Final (best of 11 legs); 15 February
1	(Scotland) Anderson 103.78	2
2	(Netherlands) van Gerwen 117.94	6
