= Kim Viljanen =

Finnish darts player

Personal information
- Nickname: "Babyface"
- Born: 4 December 1981 (age 44) Finland
- Home town: Vantaa, Finland

Sport
- Sport: Darts
- Playing since: 1997
- Darts: 21 Gram Cosmo
- Laterality: Right-handed
- Walk-on music: "Crazy Train" by Ozzy Osbourne

Organisation (see split in darts)
- BDO: 1999–2014
- PDC: 2014–

WDF major events – best performances
- World Masters: Last 32: 2004
- Int. Darts League: Last 32 Group: 2005

PDC premier events – best performances
- World Championship: Last 64: 2016, 2017, 2018

Other tournament wins
- Years
PDC European Tour Nordic and Baltic Qualifier	2017 (x2)
PDC World Scandinavian Qualifying Event	2014
WDF World Cup Team	2005
WDF World Youth Cup	1999
WDF Team Managers Cup	2024
SDC Pro Tour
SDC Denmark	2014, 2015 (x2), 2016
SDC Finland	2016
SDC Russia	2015
SDC Sweden	2016
PDCNB Pro Tour
PDCNB Denmark	2017 (x2), 2018
PDCNB Finland	2017, 2020
PDCNB Latvia	2017 (x2)
PDCNB Sweden	2017 (x2)

Kim Viljanen (born 4 December 1981) is a Finnish darts player.

== Career ==
Viljanen won the boys' singles event at the 1999 WDF World Cup in Durban, South Africa. In 2004, he progressed to the last 32 of the World Masters, losing 3–2 to Tony West.

Viljanen competed on the Scandinavian Darts Corporation (SDC) Tour in 2014, and finished third in the Scandinavian Order of Merit. He was awarded a place in the 2015 PDC World Championship after Jarkko Komula, who had finished second on the Scandinavian Tour, was excluded following a suspension by the Finnish Darts Organisation. He lost 4–1 in the preliminary round to Sascha Stein.

Viljanen won three SDC Tour events in 2015 and finished top of the Order of Merit, thus qualifying for the 2016 PDC World Championship. After winning 2–1 against Sven Groen in the preliminary round, he was beaten 3–0 by Kevin Painter in the first round. Viljanen made his debut at the 2016 World Cup of Darts, representing Finland with Marko Kantele and they lost 5–1 to Wales in the opening round. Another three SDC titles saw him qualify for the 2017 World Championship and he saw off Ross Snook 2–0 in the preliminary round, but could only win one leg against world number one Michael van Gerwen during a 3–0 first round loss. Viljanen missed two match darts in the first round of the World Cup as he and Kantele were knocked out 5–4 by Wales.

== World Championship results ==
=== PDC ===
- 2015: Preliminary round (lost to Sascha Stein 1–4)
- 2016: First round (lost to Kevin Painter 0–3)
- 2017: First round (lost to Michael van Gerwen 0–3)
- 2018: First round (lost to Alan Norris 0–3)
- 2021: Withdrew for health reasons
