= Scott MacKenzie (darts player) =

Hong Kong darts player

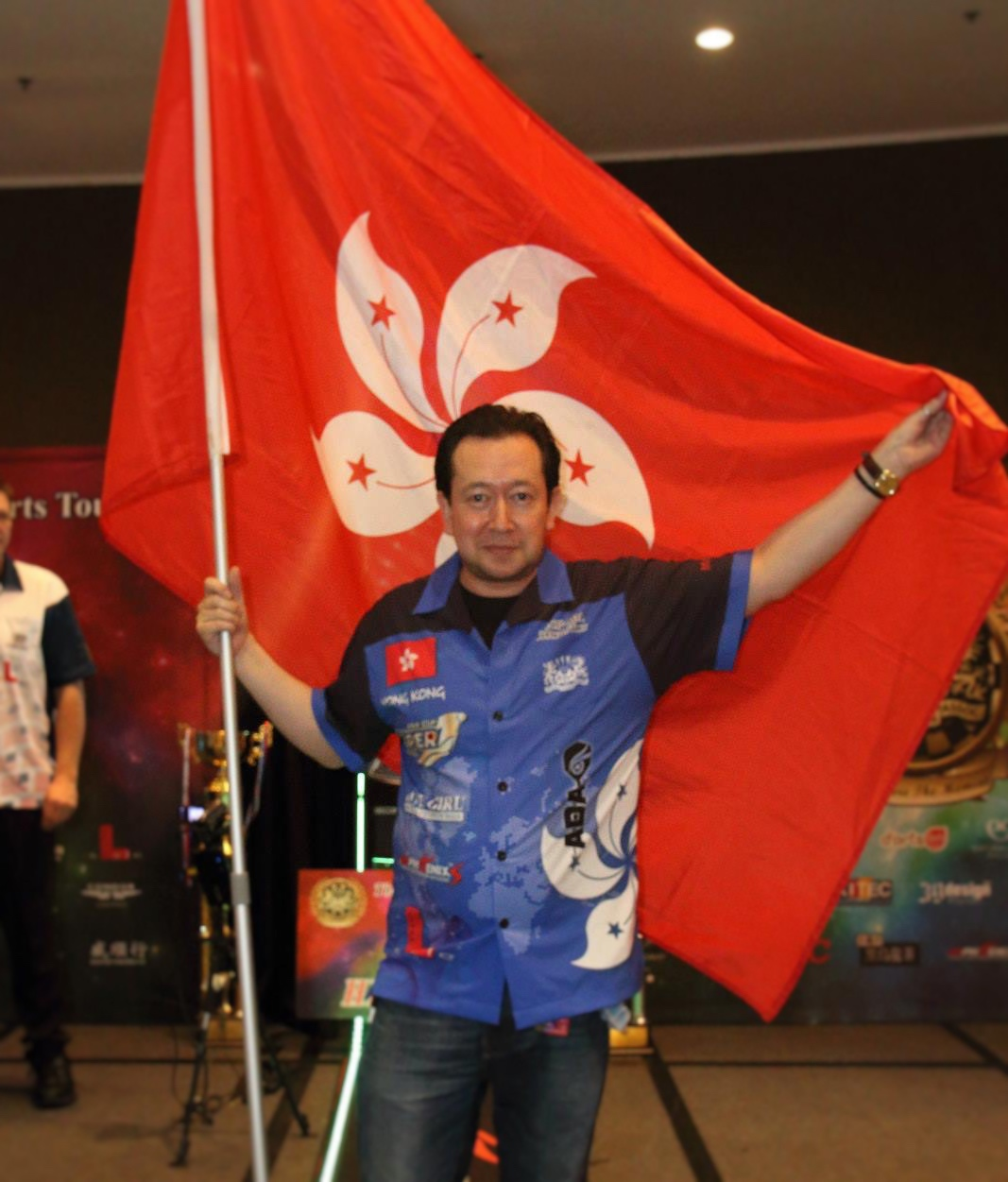

Personal information
- Full name: Ronald Scott Alexander MacKenzie
- Nickname: The Alchemist
- Born: 21 February 1972 (age 54) São Paulo, Brazil
- Home town: Hong Kong

Sport
- Sport: Darts
- Playing since: 1996
- Darts: 22g DMC Signature
- Laterality: Right-handed
- Walk-on music: "You Could Be Mine" by Guns N' Roses

Organisation (see split in darts)
- BDO: 2007–2010
- PDC: 2010–2017

WDF major events – best performances
- World Masters: Last 72: 2011

PDC premier events – best performances
- World Championship: Last 64: 2012

Other tournament wins
- Years
Hong Kong Open	2010, 2015
PDC China Qualifier	2010, 2011
Medal record
Men's Darts
Representing Hong Kong
WDF Asia-Pacific Cup
Silver medal – second place	2010 Tokyo	Men's pairs
Silver medal – second place	2016 Osaka	Team event
Bronze medal – third place	2010 Tokyo	Team event
Bronze medal – third place	2012 Darwin	Men's singles
Bronze medal – third place	2012 Darwin	Men's pairs
Bronze medal – third place	2012 Darwin	Team event
Bronze medal – third place	2016 Osaka	Men's pairs

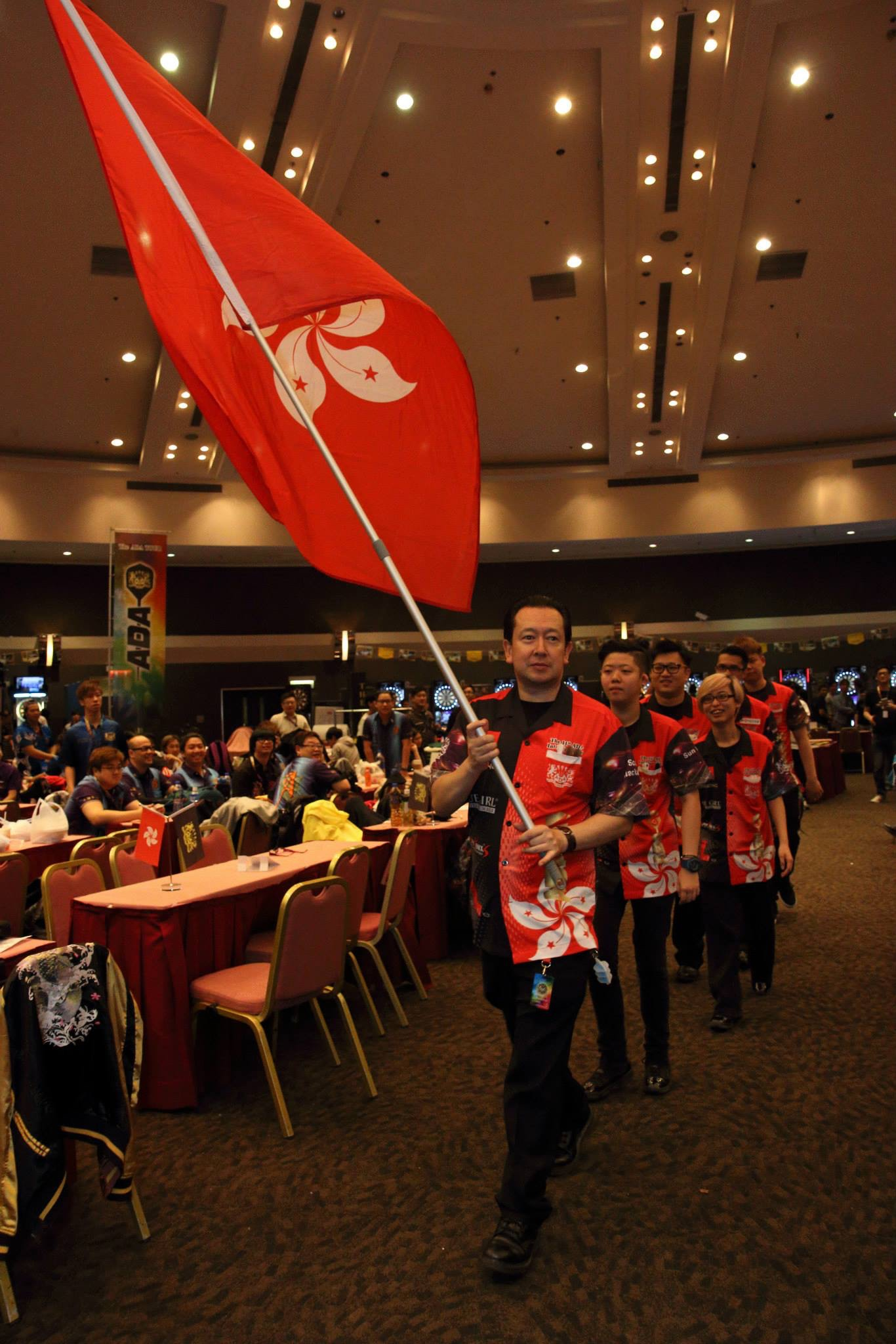
Asia Darts Association event. Scott Mackenzie at the front holding flag.

Scott MacKenzie (born 21 February 1972) is a former professional darts player based in Hong Kong. He has represented Hong Kong on numerous occasions (in both steel tip and soft tip darts), including captaining the Hong Kong team at the 2008 Asia Pacific Cup in New Zealand and 2012 team to Australia. He was also a member of the 2010 and 2016 Asia Pacific Cup teams. He has played in a total of 3 PDC World Championships and 3 PDC World Cups currently more than any other Hong Kong darts player.

== Career ==
MacKenzie won the PDC Greater China Qualifier, defeating Alex Hon in the final, to qualify for the 2011 PDC World Darts Championship. He became the first player from Hong Kong to qualify for a World Darts Championship. He played Germany's Jyhan Artut in the preliminary round, and missed two darts to win the match before losing 3–4.

MacKenzie qualified for his second successive PDC World Championship in 2012 after defeating Royden Lam in the PDC Greater China Qualifier final. He beat Paul Barham 4–2 in the best of seven legs preliminary round match to make it through to the last 64 for the first time. He played former World quarter-finalist, Wayne Jones, and was beaten 1–3. In the rest of 2012 he lost in the quarter-finals of the Pacific Masters to Tony Carmichael and was also defeated in the semi-finals of the WDF Asia-Pacific Cup and Hong Kong Open. He entered the PDC Qualifying School in an attempt to win a 2-year tour card but could not finish in the top 4 on any of the four days, but finished high enough in the rankings to eventually play in the pro tour events during that year.

MacKenzie made his debut in the World Cup of Darts in June 2014 where he represented Hong Kong with Royden Lam, they have played in a total of 3 PDC World Cups together. They defeated Norway 5–2 in the first round in 2014 to face Australia in the second round. Lam lost his singles match against Simon Whitlock, before MacKenzie saw off Paul Nicholson to mean a doubles match was required to settle the tie, which Hong Kong were whitewashed in 4–0.

MacKenzie qualified for his 3rd PDC World Championship in 2015 where MacKenzie reached the final of the 2015 World Championship PDPA qualifier and lost 5–2 to Jason Hogg. However, it was enough to earn him a spot in the preliminary round of the event where he raced into a 3–0 lead over Daryl Gurney and missed one dart to win 4–0. Gurney levelled the match at 3–3, before MacKenzie missed a dart at double 11 to complete a 142 finish and was defeated 4–3. MacKenzie and Lam caused a couple of shocks at the World Cup. First they defeated Wales' Mark Webster and Jamie Lewis 5–3. Lam then beat Ireland's William O'Connor 4–1, but MacKenzie missed six match darts against Connie Finnan from 3–0 up to lose 4–3 meaning a doubles match was needed to settle the tie. It went to the final leg in which MacKenzie finished 86 to send Hong Kong into the quarter-finals. However, number two seeds Scotland proved to be too much as Gary Anderson and Peter Wright won both their singles matches 4–2 to eliminate Hong Kong. MacKenzie claimed the 2015 Hong Kong Open by beating Alex Hon. Mackenzie and Lam represented Hong Kong for a third successive time at the PDC World Cup in 2016 where again they played Ireland, a team consisting of William O'Connor and Mick McGowan, and they eventually lost 5–4 in the first round.

MacKenzie has stated he has suffered from dartitis since the middle of 2014 which has greatly affected his form and results, but has managed to keep it at bay to a certain extent.

== World Championship results ==
=== PDC ===
- 2011: Preliminary round (lost to Jyhan Artut 3–4) (legs)
- 2012: First round (lost to Wayne Jones 1–3) (sets)
- 2015: Preliminary round (lost to Daryl Gurney 3–4) (legs)

== Personal life ==
MacKenzie was born in São Paulo to a Japanese-Brazilian mother and a Scottish father. After spending the first six years of his life in Brazil, MacKenzie and his family relocated to the UK. He moved to Hong Kong in 1996.

He obtained a BSc followed by a MSc in Chemistry whilst studying at the University of Kent. He was sponsored by Puma darts and has also recently been sponsored by Dartslive, DMC Darts and L-style. When not playing darts, he is an investor relations manager for a hedge fund. He is a fan of conspiracy theories associated with David Icke and often uses flights as well as wearing a sponsorship patch with DavidIcke.com written on during tournaments as free advertising.
