= Scott Kirchner =

American darts player

Personal information
- Full name: Darren Scott Kirchner
- Nickname: "Kung Fu Panda"
- Born: 27 August 1969 (age 57) Janesville, Wisconsin, U.S.

Sport
- Sport: Darts
- Playing since: 1989
- Darts: 20g One80
- Laterality: Right-handed
- Walk-on music: "Crazy Crazy Nights" by Kiss

Organisation (see split in darts)
- BDO: 2002–2005
- PDC: 2005–2017

PDC premier events – best performances
- World Championship: Last 64: 2015
- US Open/WSoD: Last 128: 2008, 2010

Other tournament wins
- Years
| PDC World Dartslive Soft Tip Qualifier | 2014 |
| Soft Tip Bullshooter World Championship | 2002 |
| Soft Tip Dartslive Hong Kong | 2013 |
| Soft Tip NDA World Championship | 2008 |

Darren Scott "Scotty" Kirchner (born August 27, 1969) is an American former professional darts player who has competed in the Professional Darts Corporation (PDC) tournaments.

== Career ==
Kirchner's first tournament win came at the 2002 Soft Tip Bullshooter World Championship where he beat James Harvey in the final. He reached the final of the Soft Tip NDA World Championship a year later but lost against Alexander Kohler. Kirchner won the event in 2008 by seeing off Stefan Nilles.

He began competing in Dartslive Soft Tip events in 2012 and progressed through to the final of the Hong Kong event where Paul Lim beat him. Kirchner made amends for this a year later by claiming the title in a win over Lim. In 2014 he qualified for the 2015 World Championship by winning the World Dartslive Soft Tip Qualifier. Kirchner enjoyed a 4–0 whitewash over Mark McGrath in the preliminary round and then proved to be an awkward opponent for world number four Gary Anderson, who struggled against Kirchner's slow pace of play. Kirchner lost the opening set in a deciding leg but leveled the match by taking the second without reply. Kirchner missed one dart at double 11 for a 124 finish in the decider of the third set and would go on to lose 3–1.

He lost in the quarter-finals of the Korean Soft Tip Dartslive event in 2016.

Kirchner Quit the PDC in 2017.

== Playing style ==
Kirchner has a rare style of play; when coming to the oche to throw his set of three darts he will throw an imaginary dart at the board first before using that as a basis for throwing the three real darts. This greatly slows down his play and has been known to cause frustration to opponents that prefer a quicker style of play.

== World Championship results ==
=== PDC ===
- 2015: First round (lost to Gary Anderson 1–3) (sets)
