= 2013 UK Open =

2013 Speedy Services UK Open

Tournament information
- Dates: 6–9 June 2013
- Venue: Reebok Stadium
- Location: Bolton
- Country: England
- Organisation(s): PDC
- Format: Legs; Final – best of 21
- Prize fund: £200,000
- Winner's share: £40,000
- High checkout: 170 (England) Andy Hamilton x2

Champion(s)
- (England) Phil Taylor

The 2013 Speedy Services UK Open was a darts tournament staged by the Professional Darts Corporation. It was the eleventh year of the UK Open tournament where, following numerous regional qualifying heats throughout Britain, players competed in a single elimination tournament to be crowned champion. The tournament was held at the Reebok Stadium in Bolton, England, between 6–9 June 2013, and has the nickname, "the FA Cup of darts" as a random draw is staged after each round until the final.

Phil Taylor won the title, defeating Andy Hamilton 11–4 in the final to claim his fifth and final UK Open title.

The 2013 UK Open was the last UK Open to be held at the Reebok Stadium in Bolton, and was the last UK Open to be broadcast on Sky Sports in June. Starting in 2014, the UK Open moved to the Butlins Resort in Minehead, and has been broadcast on ITV4 in March.

== Format and qualifiers ==
=== 2013 UK Open qualifiers ===
There were eight qualifying events staged across England between February and April 2013 to determine the UK Open Order of Merit Table. The tournament winners were:

No.	Date	Venue	Winner	Legs	Runner-up	Ref.
1	Saturday 23 February	K2 Centre, Crawley	Michael van Gerwen (Netherlands)	6–2	(England) Dave Chisnall	
2	Sunday 24 February	K2 Centre, Crawley	Michael van Gerwen (Netherlands)	6–2	(Northern Ireland) Brendan Dolan	
3	Saturday 16 March	Robin Park Tennis Centre, Wigan	Michael van Gerwen (Netherlands)	6–2	(England) Michael Smith	
4	Sunday 17 March	Robin Park Tennis Centre, Wigan	Robert Thornton (Scotland)	6–4	(England) Jamie Caven	
5	Saturday 13 April	Robin Park Tennis Centre, Wigan	Simon Whitlock (Australia)	6–1	(Netherlands) Michael van Gerwen	
6	Sunday 14 April	Robin Park Tennis Centre, Wigan	Michael van Gerwen (Netherlands)	6–5	(Belgium) Kim Huybrechts	
7	Saturday 27 April	Robin Park Tennis Centre, Wigan	Kim Huybrechts (Belgium)	6–2	(Canada) John Part	
8	Sunday 28 April	Robin Park Tennis Centre, Wigan	Michael van Gerwen (Netherlands)	6–0	(England) Mervyn King	

The tournament features 146 players. The results of the eight qualifiers shown above were collated into the UK Open Order Of Merit. The top 32 players in the Order of Merit, who played a minimum of two events, received a place at the final tournament. In addition, the next 82 players in the Order of Merit list qualified for the tournament, but needed to start in the earlier rounds played on the Thursday. A further 32 players qualified via regional qualifying tournaments.

=== Top 32 in Order of Merit (receiving byes into third round) ===
1. (Netherlands) Michael van Gerwen
2. (Scotland) Robert Thornton
3. (Belgium) Kim Huybrechts
4. (Scotland) Peter Wright
5. (Australia) Simon Whitlock
6. (Scotland) Gary Anderson
7. (England) Mervyn King
8. (England) Ronnie Baxter
9. (Canada) John Part
10. (Northern Ireland) Brendan Dolan
11. (England) Michael Smith
12. (England) Dave Chisnall
13. (England) Jamie Caven
14. (Scotland) Jason Hogg
15. (England) Adrian Lewis
16. (England) Ian White
17. (England) Wes Newton
18. (England) Terry Jenkins
19. (England) Stuart Kellett
20. (England) Kevin Painter
21. (England) Andy Hamilton
22. (England) John Bowles
23. (Australia) Paul Nicholson
24. (England) Steve Beaton
25. (Netherlands) Raymond van Barneveld
26. (England) Ross Smith
27. (Belgium) Ronny Huybrechts
28. (Canada) Ken MacNeil
29. (England) Colin Lloyd
30. (England) Kevin McDine
31. (England) Scott Rand
32. (Wales) Mark Webster

=== Number 33-64 of the Order of Merit (receiving byes into second round) ===
33. (England) Mark Cox
34. (Northern Ireland) Mickey Mansell
35. (England) Alex Roy
36. (Wales) Kevin Thomas
37. (England) Andy Jenkins
38. (Netherlands) Co Stompé
39. (England) Mark Walsh
40. (England) Paul Amos
41. (England) Colin Fowler
42. (England) Ricky Evans
43. (England) Joe Cullen
44. (England) Phil Taylor
45. (Germany) Jyhan Artut
46. (England) Steve West
47. (England) Nigel Heydon
48. (Sweden) Magnus Caris
49. (England) Andy Smith
50. (Scotland) John Henderson
51. (England) Matthew Edgar
52. (England) Arron Monk
53. (England) Terry Temple
54. (England) Joey Palfreyman
55. (England) Lee Palfreyman
56. (England) Kevin Dowling
57. (England) Ricky Sudale
58. (England) Peter Hudson
59. (England) Adam Hunt
60. (Wales) Richie Burnett
61. (Netherlands) Jelle Klaasen
62. (England) Dennis Smith
63. (England) Richie Howson
64. (Scotland) Jim Walker

=== Remaining Order of Merit qualifiers (starting in first and preliminary round) ===
65. (England) Adrian Gray
66. (England) James Wade
67. (Netherlands) Leon de Geus
68. (England) Matt Padgett
69. (Republic of Ireland) Connie Finnan
70. (England) Dave Weston
71. (England) Justin Pipe
72. (England) Nick Fullwell
73. (England) Tony West
74. (England) Chris Aubrey
75. (Germany) Tomas Seyler
76. (Netherlands) Gino Vos
77. (Republic of Ireland) Paddy Meaney
78. (England) Steve Brown
79. (England) Scott Coleman
80. (England) Darren Johnson
81. (England) Mark Dudbridge
82. (England) Steve Farmer
83. (England) Dean Winstanley
84. (Netherlands) Vincent van der Voort
85. (Republic of Ireland) William O'Connor
86. (England) Dave Place
87. (England) Jason Wilson
88. (England) Ted Hankey
89. (Northern Ireland) Campbell Jackson
90. (England) John Scott
91. (England) Steve Hine
92. (England) Alan Derrett
93. (England) Andy Parsons
94. (Netherlands) Roland Scholten
95. (England) James Hubbard
96. (Germany) Bernd Roith
97. (Spain) Antonio Alcinas
98. (England) Shaun Griffiths
99. (England) Keegan Brown
100. (Austria) Mensur Suljović
101. (Hong Kong) Royden Lam
102. (England) Wayne Jones
103. (England) Colin Osborne
104. (England) David Copley
105. (England) Gaz Cousins
106. (Republic of Ireland) Keith Rooney
107. (England) Mark Lawrence
108. (England) Kirk Shepherd
109. (Wales) Gareth Pass
110. (India) Prakash Jiwa
111. (Wales) Jamie Lewis
112. (England) Matthew Dennant
113. (England) Vernon Sheppard
114. (England) Johnny Haines

=== Speedy qualifiers ===
32 players qualified from Speedy qualifiers held at four venues across Britain in April.

Hampden Park, Glasgow

- (Scotland) Gus Santana
- (Scotland) Andy Murray
- (Scotland) Gary Stone
- (Scotland) Jamie Hagen
- (Scotland) Tam Dymond
- (Scotland) Scott Robertson
- (Scotland) Andrew McNicol
- (England) Andy Boulton

Old Trafford, Manchester

- (England) Stephen Bunting
- (England) Michael Bushby
- (England) Mark McGeeney
- (England) Darren Twist
- (England) Stuart Lowe
- (England) Nigel Daniels
- (England) Tony Martin
- (England) Paul Whitworth

Civic Hall, Wolverhampton

- (England) Darrell Thorpe
- (England) Matt Gallett
- (England) Gavin Baker
- (England) Michael Musto
- (England) Robbie Singleton
- (England) Robbie Green
- (England) Jake Pennington
- (England) Dean Stewart

Alexandra Palace, London

- (England) Conan Whitehead
- (England) Darrell Townsend
- (England) Terry Dunford
- (England) John Mortimer
- (Austria) Maik Langendorf
- (England) Scott Marsh
- (England) Steven Mead
- (England) Michael Burgoine

== Prize money ==
For the fifth consecutive UK Open, the prize fund was £200,000.

Stage (no. of players)		Prize money (Total: £200,000)
Winner	(1)	£40,000
Runner-Up	(1)	£20,000
Semi-finalists	(2)	£10,000
Quarter-finalists	(4)	£6,000
Last 16 (fifth round)	(8)	£4,000
Last 32 (fourth round)	(16)	£2,000
Last 64 (third round)	(32)	£1,000
Last 96 (second round)	(32)	n/a
Last 128 (first round)	(32)	n/a
Last 146 (preliminary round)	(18)	n/a

== Draw ==
=== Thursday 6 June; Best of nine legs ===
==== Preliminary round ====
Player	Score	Player	Player	Score	Player
(England) Robbie Green	2–5	(England) James Wade	(Netherlands) Vincent van der Voort	5–4	(Scotland) Andy Murray
(England) Nick Fullwell	1–5	(England) Wayne Jones	(England) Colin Osborne	5–3	(England) Steve Hine
(England) Steve Farmer	5–3	(England) Chris Aubrey	(England) Stuart Lowe	1–5	(England) Jake Pennington
(Netherlands) Gino Vos	5–3	(England) Alan Derrett	(England) Keegan Brown	5–3	(Republic of Ireland) Keith Rooney
(England) Stephen Bunting	5–0	(England) Vernon Shepherd	(Republic of Ireland) Connie Finnan	5–2	(Northern Ireland) Campbell Jackson
(England) Scott Coleman	5–0	(England) Mark McGeeney	(England) Mickey Musto	1–5	(Germany) Bernd Roith
(Austria) Maik Langendorf	5–2	(England) Tony Martin	(England) Darren Johnson	5–3	(Spain) Antonio Alcinas
(Hong Kong) Royden Lam	5–2	(Republic of Ireland) Paddy Meaney	(England) Tony West	5–3	(Wales) Jamie Lewis
(Scotland) Tam Dymond	1–5	(England) Gavin Baker	(England) Terry Dunford	1–5	(England) Dean Stewart

==== First round ====
Player	Score	Player	Player	Score	Player
(England) Conan Whitehead (Q)	5–4	(Netherlands) Roland Scholten	(England) James Hubbard	5–2	(England) John Scott
(England) Mark Lawrence	5–4	(Austria) Mensur Suljović	(England) Darrell Thorpe	0–5	(England) Stephen Bunting
(England) Dave Weston	5–4	(England) Dean Winstanley	(England) Paul Whitworth	2–5	(England) Andy Boulton
(England) Justin Pipe	2–5	(England) Gareth Pass	(England) Steve Farmer	2–5	(England) Gaz Cousins
(England) Michael Burgoine	5–0	(England) Darren Twist	(England) James Wade	5–0	(England) Matt Gallett
(India) Prakash Jiwa	5–2	(England) Darren Johnson	(Scotland) Gary Stone	5–4	(Austria) Maik Langendorf
(England) Jay Wilson	5–2	(Germany) Tomas Seyler	(England) Steve Brown	4–5	(England) Adrian Gray
(England) Gavin Baker	4–5	(England) Dave Place	(England) Tony West	3–5	(England) Jake Pennington
(England) Andy Parsons	5–3	(Scotland) Jamie Hagan	(Scotland) Andrew McNicol	2–5	(England) Steven Mead
(Germany) Bernd Roith	3–5	(England) Ted Hankey	(England) Shaun Griffiths	2–5	(England) Keegan Brown
(England) Michael Bushby	5–4	(England) John Mortimer	(England) Nigel Daniels	1–5	(England) Johnny Haines
(England) Scott Coleman	3–5	(England) Scott Marsh	(Republic of Ireland) Connie Finnan	5–1	(Netherlands) Gino Vos
(England) Matthew Dennant	5–3	(England) Darrell Townsend	(England) Matt Padgett	5–0	(England) David Copley
(England) Dean Stewart	5–3	(Scotland) Gus Santana	(Netherlands) Vincent van der Voort	3–5	(England) Kirk Shepherd
(England) Robbie Singleton	1–5	(Republic of Ireland) William O'Connor	(Netherlands) Leon de Geus	3–5	(Scotland) Scott Robertson
(England) Colin Osborne	5–4	(England) Mark Dudbridge	(England) Wayne Jones	5–3	(Hong Kong) Royden Lam

==== Second round ====
Player	Score	Player	Player	Score	Player
(England) Ricky Sudale	4–5	(Wales) Richie Burnett	(England) Kevin Dowling	1–5	(England) Phil Taylor
(England) Matthew Edgar	5–4	(England) Colin Osborne	(England) Ted Hankey	5–1	(England) Dave Weston
(England) Alex Roy	4–5	(England) Mark Cox	(England) Jake Pennington	3–5	(England) Steve West
(Sweden) Magnus Caris	1–5	(England) Kirk Shepherd	(England) Joey Palfreyman	5–3	(England) Keegan Brown
(England) Adam Hunt	5–1	(England) Paul Amos	(England) Scott Marsh	0–5	(Germany) Jyhan Artut
(Republic of Ireland) Connie Finnan	4–5	(England) Adrian Gray	(England) Stephen Bunting	5–2	(England) Jay Wilson
(England) Colin Fowler	4–5	(England) Matt Padgett	(Scotland) Gary Stone	1–5	(England) Dennis Smith
(England) James Wade	5–0	(England) Wayne Jones	(England) Steve Mead	3–5	(England) Dean Stewart
(Netherlands) Co Stompé	4–5	(Northern Ireland) Mickey Mansell	(England) Peter Hudson	4–5	(England) Mark Lawrence
(England) James Hubbard	3–5	(England) Andy Smith	(England) Michael Bushby	1–5	(Scotland) Jim Walker
(England) Mark Walsh	4–5	(England) Lee Palfreyman	(England) Arron Monk	2–5	(England) Gaz Cousins
(Scotland) Scott Robertson	4–5	(England) Andy Boulton	(England) Gareth Pass	4–5	(Netherlands) Jelle Klaasen
(England) Ricky Evans	2–5	(England) Joe Cullen	(England) Terry Temple	5–1	(India) Prakash Jiwa
(England) Dave Place	2–5	(Scotland) John Henderson	(Republic of Ireland) William O'Connor	5–2	(England) Johnny Haines
(England) Andy Jenkins	5–4	(England) Nigel Heydon	(England) Michael Burgoine	4–5	(England) Richie Howson
(Wales) Kevin Thomas	1–5	(England) Conan Whitehead (Q)	(England) Matthew Dennant	5–2	(England) Andy Parsons

=== Friday 7 June; Best of seventeen legs ===
==== Third round ====
Player	Score	Player	Player	Score	Player
(Wales) Mark Webster	2–9	(Wales) Richie Burnett	(Canada) John Part	9–4	(England) Ted Hankey
(England) Phil Taylor	9–0	(Belgium) Ronny Huybrechts	(Netherlands) Michael van Gerwen	9–5	(England) Mervyn King
(Belgium) Kim Huybrechts	9–5	(Germany) Jyhan Artut	(Australia) Simon Whitlock	4–9	(England) Wes Newton
(Netherlands) Raymond van Barneveld	9–8	(England) Michael Smith	(England) Adrian Lewis	9–1	(England) Matthew Dennant
(England) Steve West	9–3	(England) Ian White	(England) Matt Padgett	9–2	(England) Richie Howson
(England) Mark Lawrence	4–9	(England) Terry Temple	(England) Conan Whitehead (Q)	8–9	(Northern Ireland) Mickey Mansell
(England) Kevin McDine	9–8	(England) Adam Hunt	(Scotland) Peter Wright	9–4	(England) Gaz Cousins
(England) Steve Beaton	5–9	(England) Joey Palfreyman	(England) Adrian Gray	9–5	(England) Dean Stewart (Q)
(Scotland) John Henderson	9–7	(England) Scott Rand	(England) Dave Chisnall	9–4	(Republic of Ireland) William O'Connor
(England) James Wade	9–7	(England) Jamie Caven	(Scotland) Robert Thornton	9–7	(England) Matthew Edgar
(England) John Bowles	9–5	(Australia) Paul Nicholson	(England) Terry Jenkins	9–7	(Scotland) Jim Walker
(Canada) Ken MacNeil	8–9	(England) Ronnie Baxter	(England) Andy Hamilton	9–6	(England) Andy Boulton (Q)
(England) Stephen Bunting (Q)	9–3	(England) Andy Jenkins	(England) Kirk Shepherd	9–7	(England) Mark Cox
(England) Stuart Kellett	9–3	(England) Dennis Smith	(England) Kevin Painter	9–1	(Scotland) Jason Hogg
(England) Lee Palfreyman	9–5	(England) Joe Cullen	(England) Ross Smith	7–9	(Netherlands) Jelle Klaasen
(Northern Ireland) Brendan Dolan	9–8	(England) Colin Lloyd	(Scotland) Gary Anderson	9–7	(England) Andy Smith

=== Saturday 8 June; Best of seventeen legs ===
==== Fourth round ====
Player	Score	Player	Player	Score	Player
(England) Ronnie Baxter	9–6	(England) Lee Palfreyman	(Canada) John Part	4–9	(England) Andy Hamilton
(England) Terry Jenkins	9–6	(Belgium) Kim Huybrechts	(England) Terry Temple	9–7	(England) John Bowles
(England) Wes Newton †	8–9	(England) Adrian Lewis	(Scotland) Gary Anderson	7–9	(England) Kevin Painter
(Northern Ireland) Brendan Dolan	9–6	(England) Matt Padgett	(Netherlands) Michael van Gerwen	9–3	(Northern Ireland) Mickey Mansell
(Scotland) Robert Thornton	9–5	(England) Kirk Shepherd	(England) Kevin McDine	8–9	(Scotland) John Henderson
(England) Stephen Bunting (Q)	2–9	(Scotland) Peter Wright	(England) Dave Chisnall	2–9	(England) James Wade
(England) Joey Palfreyman	3–9	(Netherlands) Raymond van Barneveld	(England) Steve West	9–6	(Wales) Richie Burnett
(England) Phil Taylor	9–2	(England) Adrian Gray	(Netherlands) Jelle Klaasen	9–3	(England) Stuart Kellett

† Newton hit a nine-dart finish, having thrown 180, 180, and 141 to finish the leg.

==== Fifth round ====
Player	Score	Player
(England) Steve West	4–9	(Scotland) Peter Wright
(England) Andy Hamilton	9–1	(England) Terry Temple
(England) Ronnie Baxter	9–7	(Netherlands) Jelle Klaasen
(Scotland) John Henderson	4–9	(England) James Wade
(Netherlands) Raymond van Barneveld	9–7	(Scotland) Robert Thornton
(England) Phil Taylor	9–8	(Northern Ireland) Brendan Dolan
(Netherlands) Michael van Gerwen	9–3	(England) Terry Jenkins
(England) Adrian Lewis	9–4	(England) Kevin Painter

=== Sunday 9 June ===
==== Quarter-finals; Best of nineteen legs ====
Player	Score	Player
(Netherlands) Raymond van Barneveld 95.32	10–9	(England) Ronnie Baxter 97.13
(England) Andy Hamilton 98.25	10–8	(England) James Wade 97.33
(England) Phil Taylor 106.56	10–7	(Netherlands) Michael van Gerwen 101.67
(Scotland) Peter Wright 98.82	10–6	(England) Adrian Lewis 93.57

==== Semi-finals and Final ====
Semi-finals (best of 19 legs)
(Netherlands) Raymond van Barneveld 92.93	9
(England) Andy Hamilton 90.20	10
(England) Phil Taylor 106.84	10
(Scotland) Peter Wright 97.05	5

Final (best of 21 legs)
(England) Andy Hamilton 97.95	4
(England) Phil Taylor 107.04	11

== See also ==
- 2013 PDC Pro Tour includes extended results of Pro Tour events
