= 2014 UK Open =

2014 Coral UK Open

Tournament information
- Dates: 7–9 March 2014
- Venue: Butlin's Minehead
- Location: Minehead, England
- Organisation(s): Professional Darts Corporation (PDC)
- Format: Legs; Final – best of 21
- Prize fund: £250,000
- Winner's share: £50,000

Champion(s)
- (England) Adrian Lewis

The 2014 Coral UK Open was a darts tournament staged by the Professional Darts Corporation. It was the twelfth year of the tournament where, following numerous regional qualifying heats throughout Britain, players competed in a single elimination tournament to be crowned champion. The tournament was held at the Butlin's Resort in Minehead, England, from 7 to 9 March 2014, and had the nickname, "the FA Cup of darts" as a random draw was staged after each round until the final.

Phil Taylor was the defending champion, but he suffered a huge upset by losing 9–7 to Aden Kirk in the third round.

Adrian Lewis won the fourth major title of his career beating Terry Jenkins 11–1 in the final.

== Format and qualifiers ==
=== UK Open qualifiers ===
There were six qualifying events staged in February 2014 to determine the UK Open Order of Merit Table. The tournament winners were:

No.	Date	Venue	Winner	Score	Runner-up	Ref.
1	Friday 7 February	Robin Park Tennis Centre, Wigan	Andy Hamilton (England)	6–2	(England) Adrian Lewis	
2	Saturday 8 February	Robin Park Tennis Centre, Wigan	Stephen Bunting (England)	6–5	(England) Andrew Gilding	
3	Sunday 9 February	Robin Park Tennis Centre, Wigan	Phil Taylor (England)	6–2	(England) Adrian Lewis	
4	Friday 21 February	Robin Park Tennis Centre, Wigan	Brendan Dolan (Northern Ireland)	6–1	(Wales) Jamie Lewis	
5	Saturday 22 February	Robin Park Tennis Centre, Wigan	Gary Anderson (Scotland)	6–2	(Scotland) Robert Thornton	
6	Sunday 23 February	Robin Park Tennis Centre, Wigan	Michael van Gerwen (Netherlands)	6–0	(England) Michael Smith	

The tournament featured 138 players. The results of the six qualifiers shown above were collated into the UK Open Order Of Merit. The top 32 players in the Order of Merit received a place in the third round of the final tournament. In addition, the next 82 players plus ties in the Order of Merit list qualified for the tournament, but needed to start in the earlier rounds played on the Friday. A further 32 players qualified via regional qualifying tournaments.

=== Top 32 in Order of Merit (receiving byes into third round) ===
1. (Netherlands) Michael van Gerwen
2. (England) Andy Hamilton
3. (England) Adrian Lewis
4. (Scotland) Gary Anderson
5. (England) Phil Taylor
6. (England) Stephen Bunting
7. (Northern Ireland) Brendan Dolan
8. (Belgium) Kim Huybrechts
9. (Scotland) Robert Thornton
10. (England) Justin Pipe
11. (England) Michael Smith
12. (England) Andrew Gilding
13. (England) Steve Beaton
14. (Scotland) Peter Wright
15. (England) Dean Winstanley
16. (Wales) Jamie Lewis
17. (England) Wes Newton
18. (Netherlands) Vincent van der Voort
19. (Wales) Mark Webster
20. (England) Kevin Painter
21. (England) Dave Chisnall
22. (Australia) Simon Whitlock
23. (England) Andy Smith
24. (England) Terry Jenkins
25. (England) Mervyn King
26. (Australia) Paul Nicholson
27. (England) James Wade
28. (England) Ronnie Baxter
29. (Netherlands) Christian Kist
30. (England) Mark Walsh
31. (Wales) Richie Burnett
32. (England) Nick Fullwell

=== Number 33–64 of the Order of Merit (receiving byes into second round) ===
33. (England) Steve Maish
34. (Netherlands) Jelle Klaasen
35. (England) Ian White
36. (England) Keegan Brown
37. (England) Ben Ward
38. (England) David Pallett
39. (England) Wayne Jones
40. (Northern Ireland) Daryl Gurney
41. (Netherlands) Dirk van Duijvenbode
42. (England) Jamie Caven
43. (England) Darren Webster
44. (England) Steve West
45. (Canada) John Part
46. (England) Stuart Kellett
47. (England) Gary Spedding
48. (Austria) Mensur Suljović
49. (Scotland) Mark Barilli
50. (Scotland) Jason Hogg
51. (Belgium) Ronny Huybrechts
52. (England) Nigel Heydon
53. (England) Tony Newell
54. (England) Ross Smith
55. (England) Steve Hine
56. (Belgium) Rocco Maes
57. (Scotland) John Henderson
58. (England) Michael Barnard
59. (England) Peter Hudson
60. (England) Adrian Gray
61. (England) Ian Lever
62. (England) John Bowles
63. (England) Josh Payne
64. (England) Dave Weston

=== Remaining Order of Merit qualifiers (starting in first and preliminary round) ===
65. (England) Adam Hunt
66. (Netherlands) Raymond van Barneveld
67. (Austria) Rowby-John Rodriguez
68. (England) Karl Merchant
69. (England) Jason Lovett
70. (England) Joe Murnan
71. (England) Dennis Smith
72. (England) Johnny Haines
73. (Spain) Antonio Alcinas
74. (England) Alex Roy
75. (England) Mark Hylton
76. (England) Mark Cox
77. (Republic of Ireland) William O'Connor
78. (England) Steve Brown
79. (England) Pete Dyos
80. (England) Kevin Dowling
81. (Northern Ireland) Michael Mansell
82. (England) James Hubbard
83. (England) Mick Todd
84. (England) Matthew Edgar
85. (England) Arron Monk
86. (Republic of Ireland) Glenn Spearing
87. (England) Alan Derrett
88. (England) Aden Kirk
89. (England) Steve Douglas
90. (England) Douglas Thompson
91. (Wales) Jonathan Worsley
92. (England) Davey Dodds
93. (Scotland) Ewan Hyslop
94. (Australia) Kyle Anderson
95. (England) Matt Clark
96. (Wales) Gerwyn Price
97. (Germany) Jyhan Artut
98. (England) Chris Aubrey
99. (Canada) Shaun Narain
100. (England) Kevin McDine
101. (England) Conan Whitehead
102. (England) Alan Tabern
103. (England) Brian Woods
104. (England) Nathan Derry
105. (Netherlands) Benito van de Pas
106. (England) Jeff Batham

=== Riley qualifiers (starting in first and preliminary round) ===
32 amateur players qualified from Riley qualifiers held across the UK.

- (England) Aaron Holdstock
- (England) Carl Green
- (England) Lionel Sams
- (England) Ian Jones
- (England) Alan Casey
- (England) Kevin Taylor
- (England) Shaun Lovett
- (England) Tony Broughton
- (England) Chris Dobey
- (England) James Young
- (England) Andy Boulton
- (England) Tony Randell
- (England) Scott Bennett
- (England) Paul Whitworth
- (England) William Naylor
- (England) Adam Cousins
- (Wales) Dean Reynolds
- (Scotland) Chris Mackie
- (England) Graham Dando
- (Wales) Rhys Griffin
- (Scotland) Michael Malone
- (England) Nigel Daniels
- (England) Simon Stevenson
- (England) Paul Hogan
- (England) Martin Stead
- (England) Dean Stewart
- (England) Jim Hill
- (England) Sam Allen
- (England) Mick Baker
- (England) Jason Mold
- (England) Ben Burton
- (England) David O'Brien

== Prize money ==
The prize fund had increased from £200,000 to £250,000 for this year's event.

Stage (no. of players)		Prize money (Total: £250,000)
Winner	(1)	£50,000
Runner-Up	(1)	£25,000
Semi-finalists	(2)	£12,500
Quarter-finalists	(4)	£7,500
Last 16 (fifth round)	(8)	£5,000
Last 32 (fourth round)	(16)	£3,000
Last 64 (third round)	(32)	£1,000
Last 96 (second round)	(32)	n/a
Last 128 (first round)	(32)	n/a
Last 138 (preliminary round)	(10)	n/a

== Draw ==
=== Friday 7 March; Best of nine legs ===
==== Preliminary round ====
Player	Score	Player	Player	Score	Player
(England) Carl Green	3–5	(England) Lionel Sams	(England) Brian Woods	3–5	(England) Dean Stewart
(England) Paul Whitworth	0–5	(Wales) Rhys Griffin	(England) Alan Tabern	1–5	(England) Tony Randell
(England) Martin Stead	5–3	(England) Alan Casey	(England) Kevin McDine	5–2	(England) Aaron Holdstock
(England) Ian Jones	3–5	(England) Simon Stevenson	(England) James Young	3–5	(England) David O'Brien
(England) Nathan Derry	5–2	(England) Jason Mold	(England) William Naylor	4–5	(England) Sam Allen

==== First round ====
Player	Score	Player	Player	Score	Player
(Republic of Ireland) Glenn Spearing	2–5	(Spain) Antonio Alcinas	(England) Kevin Taylor	1–5	(England) Arron Monk
(Netherlands) Raymond van Barneveld	5–3	(England) Anthony Broughton	(Australia) Kyle Anderson	4–5	(England) Kevin McDine
(England) Dennis Smith	5–1	(England) Mark Hylton	(Scotland) Ewan Hyslop	5–4	(England) Steve Brown
(England) Alan Derrett	5–2	(Germany) Jyhan Artut	(England) Ben Burton	4–5	(Northern Ireland) Michael Mansell
(England) Steve Douglas	3–5	(England) Johnny Haines	(England) James Hubbard	5–4	(England) Jeff Batham
(England) Joe Murnan	5–0	(England) Shaun Lovett	(Wales) Dean Reynolds	4–5	(England) Martin Stead
(England) Conan Whitehead	4–5	(England) Aden Kirk	(England) Mark Cox	5–4	(Canada) Shaun Narain
(England) Lionel Sams	5–3	(England) Chris Aubrey	(Wales) Rhys Griffin	3–5	(England) Karl Merchant
(England) Adam Cousins	2–5	(England) Paul Hogan	(England) Pete Dyos	3–5	(Republic of Ireland) William O'Connor
(England) Adam Hunt	5–3	(Scotland) Michael Malone	(England) Dean Stewart	5–0	(England) Graham Dando
(England) Andy Boulton	5–2	(Wales) Jonathan Worsley	(England) Matthew Edgar	5–1	(England) Matt Clark
(England) Jason Lovett	3–5	(England) Simon Stevenson	(England) Tony Randall	5–1	(Austria) Rowby-John Rodriguez
(Netherlands) Benito van de Pas	5–3	(England) Doug Thompson	(England) Jim Hill	1–5	(England) Alex Roy
(England) Sam Allen	5–3	(Scotland) Chris Mackie	(England) Nathan Derry	4–5	(Wales) Gerwyn Price
(England) Nigel Daniels	5–3	(England) Scott Bennett	(England) Michael Baker	4–5	(England) Mick Todd
(England) Kevin Dowling	5–4	(England) Chris Dobey	(England) Davy Dodds	5–1	(England) David O'Brien

==== Second round ====
Player	Score	Player	Player	Score	Player
(Scotland) John Henderson	1–5	(Netherlands) Jelle Klaasen	(England) Keegan Brown	3–5	(Austria) Mensur Suljović
(England) Ian White	5–4	(Northern Ireland) Daryl Gurney	(England) Paul Hogan	5–0	(Canada) John Part
(England) Steve Maish	5–0	(England) Ben Ward	(Belgium) Ronny Huybrechts	5–0	(England) Adrian Gray
(Scotland) Jason Hogg	5–4	(England) Wayne Jones	(England) Martin Stead	2–5	(Netherlands) Raymond van Barneveld
(England) Gary Spedding	2–5	(England) David Pallett	(England) Dennis Smith	2–5	(England) Peter Hudson
(Scotland) Ewan Hyslop	2–5	(England) Kevin McDine	(England) Alex Roy	5–4	(England) Tony Newell
(England) John Bowles	1–5	(Netherlands) Dirk van Duijvenbode	(Belgium) Rocco Maes	5–2	(England) Nigel Daniels
(England) Alan Derrett	3–5	(England) Adam Hunt	(England) Sam Allen	3–5	(England) Ross Smith
(England) Andy Boulton	5–4	(England) Josh Payne	(England) James Hubbard	5–3	(England) Steve Hine
(England) Arron Monk	4–5	(England) Karl Merchant	(Netherlands) Benito van de Pas	5–3	(England) Davy Dodds
(England) Nigel Heydon	5–4	(England) Johnny Haines	(England) Dave Weston	3–5	(England) Mick Todd
(Spain) Antonio Alcinas	5–3	(England) Matthew Edgar	(England) Lionel Sams	4–5	(England) Joe Murnan
(England) Michael Barnard	1–5	(England) Stuart Kellett	(England) Tony Randall	5–4	(England) Steve West
(England) Jamie Caven	3–5	(England) Kevin Dowling	(Northern Ireland) Michael Mansell	5–2	(England) Dean Stewart
(England) Mark Cox	1–5	(England) Darren Webster	(England) Ian Lever	3–5	(Republic of Ireland) William O'Connor
(England) Aden Kirk	5–2	(Wales) Gerwyn Price	(England) Simon Stevenson	5–3	(Scotland) Mark Barilli

==== Third round; Best of seventeen legs ====
Player	Score	Player	Player	Score	Player
(Scotland) Peter Wright	9–8	(England) Michael Smith	(England) Ronnie Baxter	5–9	(England) Adrian Lewis
(England) Aden Kirk	9–7	(England) Phil Taylor	(Netherlands) Michael van Gerwen	9–1	(England) James Hubbard
(England) Justin Pipe	7–9	(England) Dave Chisnall	(England) Kevin Painter	9–5	(Wales) Richie Burnett
(Netherlands) Raymond van Barneveld	9–3	(England) Mick Todd	(England) James Wade	9–1	(Northern Ireland) Michael Mansell
(England) Steve Beaton	6–9	(Northern Ireland) Brendan Dolan	(England) Adam Hunt	5–9	(Australia) Paul Nicholson
(England) Terry Jenkins	9–4	(England) Stuart Kellett	(England) Kevin Dowling	8–9	(England) Stephen Bunting
(Wales) Mark Webster	9–5	(England) Mark Walsh	(England) Kevin McDine	8–9	(England) David Pallett
(England) Andy Smith	3–9	(Scotland) Gary Anderson	(England) Steve Maish	1–9	(England) Nigel Heydon
(Belgium) Ronny Huybrechts	9–6	(Australia) Simon Whitlock	(Wales) Jamie Lewis	9–8	(Republic of Ireland) William O'Connor
(Scotland) Robert Thornton	9–3	(Scotland) Jason Hogg	(Austria) Mensur Suljović	9–3	(England) Tony Randall
(England) Paul Hogan	9–3	(Netherlands) Benito van de Pas	(Netherlands) Christian Kist	9–2	(Spain) Antonio Alcinas
(England) Andrew Gilding	w/o	(England) Wes Newton (withdrew)	(Netherlands) Dirk van Duijvenbode	8–9	(England) Joe Murnan
(Belgium) Kim Huybrechts	9–5	(England) Ross Smith	(England) Peter Hudson	8–9	(England) Ian White
(England) Andy Boulton	2–9	(England) Dean Winstanley	(England) Nick Fullwell	1–9	(England) Alex Roy
(England) Darren Webster	6–9	(Netherlands) Vincent van der Voort	(Belgium) Rocco Maes	6–9	(England) Simon Stevenson
(England) Karl Merhant	4–9	(England) Mervyn King	(England) Andy Hamilton	9–8	(Netherlands) Jelle Klaasen

=== Saturday 8 March ===
==== Fourth round; Best of seventeen legs ====
Player	Score	Player	Player	Score	Player
(England) James Wade	9–5	(Belgium) Kim Huybrechts	(Netherlands) Vincent van der Voort	8–9	(Netherlands) Christian Kist
(Netherlands) Michael van Gerwen	9–5	(England) Andy Hamilton	(England) Aden Kirk	9–5	(Scotland) Peter Wright
(Australia) Paul Nicholson	5–9	(England) Terry Jenkins	(Netherlands) Raymond van Barneveld	9–3	(England) Joe Murnan
(England) Dave Chisnall	4–9	(England) Mervyn King	(England) Dean Winstanley	9–6	(England) Stephen Bunting
(England) Alex Roy	5–9	(England) Ian White	(England) Nigel Heydon	7–9	(Northern Ireland) Brendan Dolan
(England) Kevin Painter	9–4	(England) Andrew Gilding	(Belgium) Ronny Huybrechts	8–9	(England) Adrian Lewis
(Austria) Mensur Suljović	9–7	(Scotland) Robert Thornton	(Scotland) Gary Anderson	9–5	(England) David Pallett
(Wales) Jamie Lewis	9–5	(England) Simon Stevenson	(Wales) Mark Webster	9–8	(England) Paul Hogan

==== Fifth round ====
Player	Score	Player
(Northern Ireland) Brendan Dolan	9–7	(England) Aden Kirk
(Austria) Mensur Suljović	9–5	(Wales) Jamie Lewis
(England) Adrian Lewis	9–2	(Netherlands) Raymond van Barneveld
(Netherlands) Michael van Gerwen	9–4	(Wales) Mark Webster
(England) Kevin Painter	9–5	(England) Dean Winstanley
(Scotland) Gary Anderson	7–9	(England) Ian White
(England) Mervyn King	9–6	(Netherlands) Christian Kist
(England) Terry Jenkins	9–8	(England) James Wade

=== Sunday 9 March ===
==== Quarter-finals; Best of nineteen legs ====
Player	Score	Player
(Netherlands) Michael van Gerwen 99.38	10–8	(England) Ian White 92.87
(England) Terry Jenkins 98.89	10–4	(Northern Ireland) Brendan Dolan 93.69
(England) Adrian Lewis 98.35	10–3	(Austria) Mensur Suljović 98.09
(England) Kevin Painter 87.35	6–10	(England) Mervyn King 94.73

==== Semi-finals and Final ====
Semi-finals (best of 19 legs)
(England) Terry Jenkins 96.65	10
(Netherlands) Michael van Gerwen 95.58	8
(England) Mervyn King 94.58	6
(England) Adrian Lewis 99.64	10

Final (best of 21 legs)
(England) Terry Jenkins 93.15	1
(England) Adrian Lewis 109.13	11
