= 2015 PDC World Darts Championship =

2014/15 William Hill World Darts Championship

Tournament information
- Dates: 18 December 2014 – 4 January 2015
- Venue: Alexandra Palace
- Location: London, England
- Organisation(s): Professional Darts Corporation (PDC)
- Format: Legs (preliminaries); Sets (from Round 1); Final – first to 7
- Prize fund: £1,250,000
- Winner's share: £250,000
- Nine-dart finish: Adrian Lewis
- High checkout: 170; Raymond van Barneveld; Michael Smith; Michael van Gerwen

Champion(s)
- Gary Anderson (SCO)

The 2015 PDC World Darts Championship (known for sponsorship reasons as the 2014/15 William Hill World Darts Championship) was the twenty-second World Championship organised by the Professional Darts Corporation since it separated from the British Darts Organisation. The event was held at the Alexandra Palace, London from 18 December 2014 to 4 January 2015.

Michael van Gerwen was the defending champion, having won his first World Championship title in 2014, but he lost 6–3 to Gary Anderson in the semi-finals. Anderson won the title by beating 16-time World Champion Phil Taylor 7–6 in the final. Taylor became the first player in PDC World Championship history to reach the PDC World Championship final, achieve a tournament 3-dart average of over 100, and yet not win the title.

Adrian Lewis threw the event's only nine-dart finish in his third round match with Raymond van Barneveld. John Michael and Boris Koltsov became the first players from Greece and Russia respectively to play in the first round of a PDC World Championship. Cristo Reyes became the first Spanish player to reach the last 16 in the history of the event.

== Format and qualifiers ==
The tournament featured 72 players. The top 32 players on the PDC Order of Merit on 2 December 2014 (after the Players Championship Finals) were seeded for the tournament. They were joined by the 16 highest non-qualified players from the Pro Tour Order of Merit, based on the events played on the 2014 PDC Pro Tour.

These 48 players were joined by two PDPA qualifiers (as determined at a PDPA Qualifying event held in Coventry on 1 December 2014), the highest ranked non-qualified player on the PDC Challenge Tour Order of Merit, and 21 international players: the four highest names on the European Order of Merit not already qualified, and 17 further international qualifiers determined by the PDC and PDPA. Some of the international players, such as the four from the European Order of Merit, and the top American and Australian players were entered straight into the first round, while others, having won qualifying events in their countries, were entered into the preliminary round.

The field was set on 1 December 2014. John Michael became the first Greek player to play in the PDC World Championship.

== Qualifiers ==
Order of Merit

1. (Netherlands) Michael van Gerwen
2. (England) Phil Taylor
3. (England) Adrian Lewis
4. (Scotland) Gary Anderson
5. (Scotland) Peter Wright
6. (England) James Wade
7. (Australia) Simon Whitlock
8. (England) Dave Chisnall
9. (Scotland) Robert Thornton
10. (England) Mervyn King
11. (Northern Ireland) Brendan Dolan
12. (England) Andy Hamilton
13. (England) Wes Newton
14. (Netherlands) Raymond van Barneveld
15. (England) Ian White
16. (England) Terry Jenkins
17. (England) Justin Pipe
18. (Belgium) Kim Huybrechts
19. (England) Jamie Caven
20. (England) Kevin Painter
21. (England) Steve Beaton
22. (England) Michael Smith
23. (Netherlands) Vincent van der Voort
24. (England) Ronnie Baxter
25. (Australia) Paul Nicholson
26. (England) Dean Winstanley
27. (England) Stephen Bunting
28. (England) Andy Smith
29. (Netherlands) Jelle Klaasen
30. (Canada) John Part
31. (Wales) Mark Webster
32. (England) Stuart Kellett

Pro Tour

1. (England) Andrew Gilding
2. (England) Darren Webster
3. (Netherlands) Benito van de Pas
4. (Netherlands) Christian Kist
5. (Wales) Jamie Lewis
6. (Belgium) Ronny Huybrechts
7. (England) Wayne Jones
8. (Wales) Gerwyn Price
9. (Scotland) John Henderson
10. (England) Keegan Brown
11. (England) David Pallett
12. (England) Joe Cullen
13. (Australia) Kyle Anderson
14. (Germany) Jyhan Artut
15. (Northern Ireland) Mickey Mansell
16. (Austria) Rowby-John Rodriguez

European Order of Merit
First round qualifiers

1. (Austria) Mensur Suljović
2. (Netherlands) Ron Meulenkamp
3. (Germany) Max Hopp
4. (Netherlands) Ryan de Vreede

PDPA Qualifier
First round qualifier

- (Scotland) Jason Hogg

Preliminary round qualifier

- (Hong Kong) Scott MacKenzie

International Qualifiers
First round qualifiers

- (Canada) Dave Richardson
- (Australia) Laurence Ryder
- (Australia) John Weber

Preliminary round qualifiers

- (South Africa) Nolan Arendse
- (Northern Ireland) Daryl Gurney
- (Finland) Jani Haavisto
- (Hong Kong) Alex Hon
- (United States) Scott Kirchner
- (Russia) Boris Koltsov
- (Croatia) Robert Marijanović
- (New Zealand) Mark McGrath
- (Greece) John Michael
- (Japan) Haruki Muramatsu
- (Philippines) Ian Perez
- (Spain) Cristo Reyes
- (Germany) Sascha Stein
- (Finland) Kim Viljanen
- (Netherlands) Jermaine Wattimena

1 Jarkko Komula, who finished second in the Scandinavian Order of Merit, was ineligible to play due to a suspension from the Finnish Darts Organisation. Kim Viljanen, who finished third, therefore replaced Komula.

2 Ryan de Vreede qualified after Richie Burnett was removed from the field after a positive drug test, despite the fact that it was recreational rather than performance-enhancing. As a result, Stuart Kellett moved into the top 32 seeds and Rowby-John Rodriguez qualified through the Pro Tour instead of the European Tour.

== Prize money ==
The 2015 World Championship featured a prize fund of at least £1,250,000 - an increase of £200,000 from the 2014 tournament.

The prize money is allocated as follows:

Position (num. of players)		Prize money (Total: £1,250,000)
Winner	(1)	£250,000
Runner-Up	(1)	£120,000
Semi-finalists	(2)	£60,000
Quarter-finalists	(4)	£35,000
Third round losers	(8)	£18,000
Second round losers	(16)	£12,000
First round losers	(32)	£8,000
Preliminary round losers	(8)	£3,500
Nine-dart finish	(1)	£10,000

== Results ==
=== Preliminary round ===
The preliminary round was played in a first to four legs format. One match was played per session with the winners playing their first round matches later on the same day. The draw was held on 30 November 2014, two days before the main draw. Gurney achieved the highest average in the history of the Preliminary round.

Av.	Player	Score	Player	Av.
89.90	Christian Perez (Philippines)	0–4	(Spain) Cristo Reyes	93.94
67.11	Kim Viljanen (Finland)	1–4	(Germany) Sascha Stein	91.30
93.76	Scott MacKenzie (Hong Kong)	3–4	(Northern Ireland) Daryl Gurney	96.11
65.09	Mark McGrath (New Zealand)	0–4	(United States) Scott Kirchner	83.50
79.27	Boris Koltsov (Russia)	4–2	(Japan) Haruki Muramatsu	75.69
83.77	Jani Haavisto (Finland)	1–4	(Greece) John Michael	94.82
84.68	Nolan Arendse (South Africa)	4–0	(Hong Kong) Alex Hon	79.22
82.77	Jermaine Wattimena (Netherlands)	3–4	(Croatia) Robert Marijanović	76.36

=== Main draw ===
==== Finals ====
Quarter-finals (best of 9 sets); 1–2 January
1	(Netherlands) Michael van Gerwen 105.26	5
9	(Scotland) Robert Thornton 101.49	2
5	(Scotland) Peter Wright 95.66	1
4	(Scotland) Gary Anderson 102.12	5
2	(England) Phil Taylor 100.08	5
23	(Netherlands) Vincent van der Voort 99.22	3
27	(England) Stephen Bunting 98.36	4
14	(Netherlands) Raymond van Barneveld 98.37	5

Semi-finals (best of 11 sets); 3 January
1	(Netherlands) Michael van Gerwen 101.35	3
4	(Scotland) Gary Anderson 102.20	6
2	(England) Phil Taylor 102.39	6
14	(Netherlands) Raymond van Barneveld 99.52	2

Final (best of 13 sets); 4 January
4	(Scotland) Gary Anderson 97.68	7
2	(England) Phil Taylor 100.69	6

==== Rounds 1–4 ====
First round (best of 5 sets); 18–23 December
1	(Netherlands) Michael van Gerwen 96.96	3
(England) Joe Cullen 93.14	1
32	(England) Stuart Kellett 73.08	1
(Germany) Sascha Stein 79.34	3
16	(England) Terry Jenkins 98.73	3
(Australia) John Weber 79.86	1
17	(England) Justin Pipe 86.28	2
(Australia) Laurence Ryder 83.59	3
8	(England) Dave Chisnall 86.08	3
(Netherlands) Ryan de Vreede 75.24	0
25	(Australia) Paul Nicholson 85.49	2
(Netherlands) Benito van de Pas 86.28	3
9	(Scotland) Robert Thornton 97.65	3
(England) Andrew Gilding 92.00	0
24	(England) Ronnie Baxter 94.64	3
(Northern Ireland) Daryl Gurney 88.78	1
5	(Scotland) Peter Wright 98.80	3
(Wales) Gerwyn Price 93.90	0
28	(England) Andy Smith 86.66	0
(Belgium) Ronny Huybrechts 87.75	3
12	(England) Andy Hamilton 91.09	3
(Canada) Dave Richardson 86.04	2
21	(England) Steve Beaton 82.24	0
(Australia) Kyle Anderson 85.99	3
4	(Scotland) Gary Anderson 86.20	3
(United States) Scott Kirchner 86.21	1
29	(Netherlands) Jelle Klaasen 96.97	3
(Netherlands) Christian Kist 93.63	1
13	(England) Wes Newton 94.61	2
(Spain) Cristo Reyes 93.47	3
20	(England) Kevin Painter 89.57	3
(Russia) Boris Koltsov 78.14	1
2	(England) Phil Taylor 100.57	3
(Germany) Jyhan Artut 87.47	0
31	(Wales) Mark Webster 81.91	3
(Netherlands) Ron Meulenkamp 77.78	1
15	(England) Ian White 86.72	3
(Greece) John Michael 81.02	1
18	(Belgium) Kim Huybrechts 99.40	3
(Northern Ireland) Mickey Mansell 87.65	0
7	(Australia) Simon Whitlock 87.29	1
(England) Darren Webster 94.24	3
26	(England) Dean Winstanley 93.66	3
(England) Wayne Jones 94.01	2
10	(England) Mervyn King 90.67	2
(Germany) Max Hopp 96.60	3
23	(Netherlands) Vincent van der Voort 93.39	3
(Scotland) John Henderson 89.13	2
6	(England) James Wade 97.14	3
(Wales) Jamie Lewis 87.75	1
27	(England) Stephen Bunting 90.20	3
(Croatia) Robert Marijanović 86.82	1
11	(Northern Ireland) Brendan Dolan 90.18	3
(South Africa) Nolan Arendse 83.85	0
22	(England) Michael Smith 97.47	3
(Austria) Mensur Suljović 98.91	1
3	(England) Adrian Lewis 101.90	3
(England) David Pallett 90.05	0
30	(Canada) John Part 84.78	2
(England) Keegan Brown 88.07	3
14	(Netherlands) Raymond van Barneveld 99.93	3
(Austria) Rowby-John Rodriguez 79.22	0
19	(England) Jamie Caven 80.87	3
(Scotland) Jason Hogg 83.85	2

Second round (best of 7 sets); 27–29 December
1	(Netherlands) van Gerwen 99.87	4
(Germany) Stein 89.09	1
16	(England) Jenkins 96.45	4
(Australia) Ryder 86.69	0
8	(England) Chisnall 93.08	2
(Netherlands) van de Pas 91.44	4
9	(Scotland) Thornton 93.78	4
24	(England) Baxter 84.48	0
5	(Scotland) Wright 95.52	4
(Belgium) R. Huybrechts 87.52	1
12	(England) Hamilton 90.06	4
(Australia) K. Anderson 90.96	2
4	(Scotland) G. Anderson 103.02	4
29	(Netherlands) Klaasen 100.72	3
(Spain) Reyes 88.41	4
20	(England) Painter 90.22	3
2	(England) Taylor 101.92	4
31	(Wales) M. Webster 93.09	0
15	(England) White 93.94	3
18	(Belgium) K. Huybrechts 93.74	4
(England) D. Webster 93.59	3
26	(England) Winstanley 92.68	4
(Germany) Hopp 86.55	0
23	(Netherlands) van der Voort 91.48	4
6	(England) Wade 90.93	1
27	(England) Bunting 93.38	4
11	(Northern Ireland) Dolan 92.89	2
22	(England) M. Smith 98.90	4
3	(England) A. Lewis 100.41	4
(England) Brown 93.09	2
14	(Netherlands) van Barneveld 93.32	4
19	(England) Caven 94.96	3

Third round (best of 7 sets); 29–30 December
1	(Netherlands) van Gerwen 99.62	4
16	(England) Jenkins 96.92	1
(Netherlands) van de Pas 89.35	0
9	(Scotland) Thornton 96.50	4
5	(Scotland) Wright 102.60	4
12	(England) Hamilton 90.94	0
4	(Scotland) G. Anderson 104.54	4
(Spain) Reyes 98.52	1
2	(England) Taylor 102.52	4
18	(Belgium) K. Huybrechts 96.93	3
26	(England) Winstanley 91.36	2
23	(Netherlands) van der Voort 93.90	4
27	(England) Bunting 102.34	4
22	(England) M. Smith 102.78	2
3	(England) A. Lewis 97.55	3
14	(Netherlands) van Barneveld 92.23	4

Quarter-finals (best of 9 sets); 1–2 January
1	(Netherlands) van Gerwen 105.26	5
9	(Scotland) Thornton 101.49	2
5	(Scotland) Wright 95.66	1
4	(Scotland) G. Anderson 102.12	5
2	(England) Taylor 100.08	5
23	(Netherlands) van der Voort 99.22	3
27	(England) Bunting 98.36	4
14	(Netherlands) van Barneveld 98.37	5

== Final ==
Final: Best of 13 sets. Referees: George Noble (first half) and Russ Bray (second half). Alexandra Palace, London, England, 4 January 2015.
(4) Gary Anderson (Scotland)	7 – 6	(England) Phil Taylor (2)
3 – 2, 2 – 3, 3 – 1, 3 – 1, 0 – 3, 0 – 3, 1 – 3, 3 – 2, 3 – 2, 3 – 1, 0 – 3, 2 – 3, 3 – 0
97.68	Average (3 darts)	100.69
19	180 scores	13
121	Highest checkout	141
39.39% (26/66)	Checkout summary	32.93% (27/82)

== Statistics ==
Player	Eliminated	Played	Sets Won	Sets Lost	Legs Won	Legs Lost	100+	140+	180s	High checkout	Checkout Av.%	Average
(Scotland) Gary Anderson	Winner	6	29	15	102	84	219	142	64	126	40	99.29
(England) Phil Taylor	Runner-up	6	28	15	99	75	234	135	36	141	41.42	101.36
(Netherlands) Michael van Gerwen	Semi-finals	5	19	11	75	62	146	108	43	170	42.37	100.61
(Netherlands) Raymond van Barneveld	Semi-finals	5	18	16	70	68	161	81	41	170	41.42	96.67
(Scotland) Peter Wright	Quarter-finals	4	12	6	45	32	127	61	13	144	46.88	98.15
(Scotland) Robert Thornton	Quarter-finals	4	13	5	47	31	106	65	29	156	39.17	97.36
(England) Stephen Bunting	Quarter-finals	4	15	9	53	41	121	75	24	161	40.46	96.07
(Netherlands) Vincent van der Voort	Quarter-finals	4	14	9	56	41	116	70	22	157	42.28	94.50
(England) Adrian Lewis	Third round	3	10	6	40	32	85	59	22	157	35.40	99.95
(England) Michael Smith	Third round	3	9	7	35	31	74	49	27	170	39.77	99.72
(England) Terry Jenkins	Third round	3	8	5	32	18	60	43	17	164	48.48	97.37
(Belgium) Kim Huybrechts	Third round	3	10	7	36	34	87	40	10	146	34.95	96.69
(Spain) Cristo Reyes	Third round	4	8	9	39	40	97	59	17	142	43.33	93.47
(England) Dean Winstanley	Third round	3	9	9	41	37	98	57	22	136	40.59	92.57
(England) Andy Hamilton	Third round	3	7	8	30	28	71	33	9	116	41.67	90.70
(Netherlands) Benito van de Pas	Third round	3	7	8	28	32	79	36	10	127	31.82	89.02
(Netherlands) Jelle Klaasen	Second round	2	6	5	22	24	60	35	8	127	30.99	98.85
(England) James Wade	Second round	2	4	5	19	18	43	37	6	96	35.19	94.04
(England) Darren Webster	Second round	2	6	5	25	23	82	41	6	136	47.83	93.92
(Northern Ireland) Brendan Dolan	Second round	2	5	4	17	13	41	19	6	128	35.42	91.54
(Germany) Max Hopp	Second round	2	3	6	19	25	62	30	14	161	31.15	91.09
(England) Keegan Brown	Second round	2	5	6	26	21	54	32	9	124	37.68	90.58
(England) Ian White	Second round	2	6	5	24	20	51	32	13	113	35.82	90.33
(England) Kevin Painter	Second round	2	6	5	24	18	51	28	6	141	41.38	89.90
(England) Dave Chisnall	Second round	2	5	4	21	15	50	19	8	116	37.50	89.58
(England) Ronnie Baxter	Second round	2	3	5	15	19	36	15	7	106	31.91	89.56
(Australia) Kyle Anderson	Second round	2	5	4	19	18	41	27	6	156	35.19	88.48
(England) Jamie Caven	Second round	2	6	6	26	22	60	27	8	127	32.50	87.92
(Belgium) Ronny Huybrechts	Second round	2	4	4	16	15	40	20	4	104	41.03	87.64
(Wales) Mark Webster	Second round	2	3	5	13	19	41	19	8	125	23.64	87.50
(Germany) Sascha Stein	Second round	3	4	5	22	21	61	28	7	120	34.92	84.77
(Australia) Laurence Ryder	Second round	2	3	6	10	19	38	21	3	101	30.30	85.14
(Austria) Mensur Suljović	First round	1	1	3	9	11	40	10	3	120	60.00	98.91
(England) Wes Newton	First round	1	2	3	13	13	38	18	4	130	34.21	94.61
(England) Wayne Jones	First round	1	2	3	8	12	19	24	4	68	40.00	94.01
(Wales) Gerwyn Price	First round	1	0	3	5	9	16	7	5	40	41.67	93.90
(Netherlands) Christian Kist	First round	1	1	3	7	9	21	8	3	136	46.67	93.63
(England) Joe Cullen	First round	1	1	3	9	11	27	15	4	161	47.37	93.14
(Northern Ireland) Daryl Gurney	First round	2	1	3	11	14	27	15	7	108	42.31	92.45
(England) Andrew Gilding	First round	1	0	3	2	9	18	8	1	56	20.00	92.00
(England) Mervyn King	First round	1	2	3	13	14	32	25	3	120	39.39	90.67
(England) David Pallett	First round	1	0	3	3	9	10	9	3	161	37.50	90.05
(Scotland) John Henderson	First round	1	2	3	9	12	30	13	4	101	27.27	89.13
(Greece) John Michael	First round	2	1	3	10	11	35	12	2	120	52.63	87.92
(Wales) Jamie Lewis	First round	1	1	3	5	11	17	10	3	141	45.45	87.75
(Northern Ireland) Michael Mansell	First round	1	0	3	5	9	15	10	5	101	33.33	87.65
(Germany) Jyhan Artut	First round	1	0	3	2	9	11	9	1	95	33.33	87.47
(Australia) Simon Whitlock	First round	1	1	3	4	11	23	6	3	40	16.67	87.29
(England) Andy Smith	First round	1	0	3	2	9	16	9	2	75	14.29	86.66
(England) Justin Pipe	First round	1	2	3	7	10	22	9	2	116	29.17	86.28
(Canada) Dave Richardson	First round	1	2	3	6	11	15	7	7	96	35.29	86.04
(Australia) Paul Nicholson	First round	1	2	3	8	10	23	11	5	116	26.67	85.49
(United States) Scott Kirchner	First round	2	1	3	12	9	25	14	2	124	31.58	84.86
(Canada) John Part	First round	1	2	3	6	12	21	8	1	115	31.58	84.78
(South Africa) Nolan Arendse	First round	2	0	3	4	9	22	4	0	60	28.57	84.27
(Scotland) Jason Hogg	First round	1	2	3	8	11	19	8	5	76	29.63	83.85
(England) Steve Beaton	First round	1	0	3	3	9	16	6	0	36	30.00	82.24
(Croatia) Robert Marijanović	First round	2	1	3	7	13	21	7	4	52	25.93	81.59
(Australia) John Weber	First round	1	1	3	4	10	18	5	1	128	50.00	79.86
(Austria) Rowby-John Rodriguez	First round	1	0	3	2	9	11	4	1	40	18.18	79.22
(Russia) Boris Koltsov	First round	2	1	3	7	11	21	6	4	60	36.84	78.71
(Netherlands) Ron Meulenkamp	First round	1	1	3	7	9	21	12	1	60	18.92	77.78
(Netherlands) Ryan de Vreede	First round	1	0	3	3	9	15	1	2	56	27.27	75.24
(England) Stuart Kellett	First round	1	1	3	7	11	19	3	3	108	41.18	73.08
(Hong Kong) Scott MacKenzie	Preliminary round	1	0	0	3	4	10	6	1	81	42.86	93.76
(Philippines) Christian Perez	Preliminary round	1	0	0	0	4	6	1	2	–	0.00	89.90
(Finland) Jani Haavisto	Preliminary round	1	0	0	1	4	6	3	1	48	50.00	83.77
(Netherlands) Jermaine Wattimena	Preliminary round	1	0	0	3	4	12	3	0	64	20.00	82.77
(Hong Kong) Alex Hon	Preliminary round	1	0	0	0	4	5	3	1	–	0.00	79.22
(Japan) Haruki Muramatsu	Preliminary round	1	0	0	2	4	12	2	0	56	20.00	75.69
(Finland) Kim Viljanen	Preliminary round	1	0	0	1	4	2	1	0	18	33.33	67.11
(New Zealand) Mark McGrath	Preliminary round	1	0	0	0	4	3	1	0	–	0.00	65.09

== Representation from different countries ==
This table shows the number of players by country in the World Championship, the total number including the preliminary round.

	(England) ENG	(Netherlands) NED	(Scotland) SCO	(Australia) AUS	(Germany) GER	(Wales) WAL	(Northern Ireland) NIR	(Belgium) BEL	(Austria) AUT	(Canada) CAN	(Finland) FIN	(Hong Kong) HKG	(Spain) SPA	(Croatia) CRO	(Greece) GRE	(South Africa) RSA	(Russia) RUS	(United States) USA	(Japan) JPN	(New Zealand) NZL	(Philippines) PHI	Total
Final	1	0	1	0	0	0	0	0	0	0	0	0	0	0	0	0	0	0	0	0	0	2
Semis	1	2	1	0	0	0	0	0	0	0	0	0	0	0	0	0	0	0	0	0	0	4
Quarters	2	3	3	0	0	0	0	0	0	0	0	0	0	0	0	0	0	0	0	0	0	8
Round 3	7	4	3	0	0	0	0	1	0	0	0	0	1	0	0	0	0	0	0	0	0	16
Round 2	15	5	3	2	2	1	1	2	0	0	0	0	1	0	0	0	0	0	0	0	0	32
Round 1	25	8	5	5	3	3	3	2	2	2	0	0	1	1	1	1	1	1	0	0	0	64
Prelim.	0	1	0	0	1	0	1	0	0	0	2	2	1	1	1	1	1	1	1	1	1	16
Total	25	9	5	5	3	3	3	2	2	2	2	2	1	1	1	1	1	1	1	1	1	72

== Broadcasting ==
The tournament was available in the following countries on these channels:

Country	Channel
United Kingdom (Republic of Ireland) Ireland	Sky Sports †
Netherlands	RTL 7
Germany	Sport1/Sport1+
Denmark	TV3 Sport1/TV3 Sport2
Australia; Italy	Fox Sports
New Zealand	Sky Sport (New Zealand)
Romania	Sport TV
Czech Republic; Slovakia; Hungary	Sport TV (Sport 1 and Sport2)
Arab world	OSN
(Bulgaria) Bulgaria; Scandinavia; Baltic states	Viasat

† Sky Sports 3 was renamed as Sky Sports Darts for the duration of the tournament. The channel's coverage of the event was later named the Best Sports of Live Event Coverage at the Broadcast Digital Awards.

=== Exhibition ===
The event also included a single-leg exhibition between two England cricket teammates – fast bowler James Anderson and opening batsman and Test captain Alastair Cook.

Av.	Player	Score	Player	Av.
40.42	James Anderson (England)	0–1	(England) Alastair Cook	41.75
