= Ronny Huybrechts =

Belgian darts player (born 1965)

Personal information
- Nickname: "The Rebel"
- Born: 20 July 1965 (age 61) Antwerp, Belgium

Sport
- Sport: Darts
- Playing since: 1985
- Darts: 22g Loxley Signature
- Laterality: Right-handed
- Walk-on music: "Rebel Rebel" by David Bowie

Organisation (see split in darts)
- BDO: 1992–1997, 2005–2012
- PDC: 2013–2024 (Tour Card: 2013–2019; 2023–2024)

WDF major events – best performances
- World Masters: Last 128: 2005

PDC premier events – best performances
- World Championship: Last 32: 2015, 2016
- World Matchplay: Last 32: 2013
- World Grand Prix: Last 32: 2017
- UK Open: Last 32: 2014
- Grand Slam: Last 16: 2013
- European Championship: Semi-final: 2013
- PC Finals: Last 64: 2016, 2017

Other tournament wins
- Years
Belgium Masters	2010
Belgium National Championships	2009, 2010, 2011
Belgium Open Pairs	2013, 2014
Dortmund Open	2008
Open West-Vlaanderen	2011
Spring Cup	2010

Other achievements
- 2015 Breaks into the top 32 on the PDC Order of Merit for the first time

Ronny Huybrechts (born 20 July 1965) is a Belgian professional darts player who formerly competed in Professional Darts Corporation (PDC) events.

== Career ==
Ronny and his brother Kim Huybrechts became the first brothers to play in the World Cup of Darts in February 2013 and advanced from Group H courtesy of a 5–0 win over Hungary. They then pulled off a shock by defeating the Australian pairing of Simon Whitlock and Paul Nicholson, who were the runners up in the event the previous year, 5–1 with a combined average of 101.08 and then beat Croatia in the quarter-finals, with Ronny defeating Robert Marijanović 4–1 in his singles match. They required a doubles match to see off Finland in the semi-finals which they won 4–0 with a 105.47 average, the highest in the three-year history of the event, to reach the final and a meeting with the English pair of Phil Taylor and Adrian Lewis. Ronny lost both of his singles matches (0–4 to Taylor and 2–4 to Lewis) meaning Kim had to beat Taylor to force a doubles match to decide the title, but he lost 1–4. The brothers dedicated their run in the tournament to their late father, Ludo, who died in December 2012.

Huybrechts beat the likes of Peter Wright and Dave Chisnall at the first Players Championship of 2013 to face Kim in the semi-finals, their first meeting in a PDC event. Ronny produced a superb performance to defeat him 6–1 with an average of almost 108 to reach his first PDC final, where he was this time the victim of world class darts as Robert Thornton averaged 111 in a 6–0 whitewash of Huybrechts. Huybrechts faced Phil Taylor in the third round of the UK Open and was beaten 9–0. He qualified for the European Championship through the European Order of Merit and beat Stuart Kellett 6–3 in the first round. Huybrechts then pulled off the result of his career to date when he faced Taylor in the second round. He defeated the 16-time world champion 10–5 and then played Thornton in Huybrechts' first major PDC quarter-final. Huybrechts edged past the Scotsman 10–9 having never been behind in the match, but saw his run end in the semi-finals when he lost 11–7 to Simon Whitlock. Huybrechts' run to the World Cup final saw him qualify for the Grand Slam of Darts where he beat 2012 BDO World Champion Christian Kist 5–3 in his opening group game. He then fought from 3–1 behind against two-time world champion Adrian Lewis to triumph 5–3 and qualify from his group with one game to spare. Huybrechts completed a hat-trick of group game wins by seeing off Richie George 5–3 and he played his brother Kim in the last 16, which saw them become the first brothers to play a televised darts match with Ronny losing 10–5.

=== 2014 season ===
Huybrechts reached his first World Championship through the ProTour Order of Merit and was incredibly drawn to face Kim again. Ronny won the first set and then missed a total of five darts to take the second. In the deciding leg of the third set he missed a single 18 to set up a double, before losing all three legs in the next set to be beaten 3–1. After the event concluded he was ranked world number 41. At the UK Open, Huybrechts saw off Simon Whitlock 9–6 in the third round and then led Adrian Lewis 7–3, but went on to lose in a deciding leg 9–8. Ronny and Kim comfortably progressed to the quarter-finals of the World Cup of Darts where they faced the Dutch number two seeds Michael van Gerwen and Raymond van Barneveld. Kim produced a superb display to defeat Van Gerwen 4–2, but Ronny then lost 4–2 to Van Barneveld meaning the tie went into a deciding doubles match which the brothers lost 4–0. A week later he beat Van Gerwen and Dean Winstanley in deciding legs at the 11th Players Championship to play in his only semi-final of 2014, where he was beaten 6–4 by Robert Thornton. Huybrechts threatened another run at the European Championship when he defeated James Wade in the first round 6–4, but he then lost 10–7 to Mervyn King. In the Grand Slam he went into his final group match against Terry Jenkins knowing a win would see him through to the last 16, but he was beaten 5–1.

=== 2015 season ===
Huybrechts beat Andy Smith 3–0 at the 2015 World Championship, before losing 4–1 against Peter Wright in round two. He was knocked out in the second round of the UK Open 5–3 against Lee Evans and could not qualify for another PDC major this year. In the quarter-finals of the World Cup Ronny took out an 86 finish on the bull in a deciding doubles match to defeat Australia's Simon Whitlock and Paul Nicholson. In the semis, Ronny lost 4–3 to Phil Taylor and Kim lost 4–2 to Adrian Lewis which saw Belgium exit the tournament. Individually, Huybrechts' best run of 2015 came at the 16th Players Championship after wins over Vincent van der Voort, Stephen Bunting and James Wade saw him reach the quarter-finals, where he lost 6–2 to Raymond van Barneveld.

=== 2016 season ===
In the deciding set of his first round match with Dean Winstanley at the 2016 World Championship, Huybrechts completed a 164 checkout with Winstanley on 40 to break his throw and then took out a 104 finish in the next leg to win 3–2. He played Peter Wright in round two for the second year in a row and lost 4–0. A 9–7 loss to Terry Jenkins followed in the third round of the UK Open. Ronny and Kim knocked out Scotland's Gary Anderson and Robert Thorton 4–2 in a doubles match to advance to the semi-finals of the World Cup. There, Ronny lost 4–1 to the Netherlands' Michael van Gerwen and Kim lost to 4–2 to Raymond van Barneveld to exit the tournament.

Huybrechts' first quarter-final in an individual event this season came at the 11th Players Championship and he was beaten 6–1 by Ian White. His first final in over three years came at the 18th event and he took a 3–0 lead over Simon Whitlock, but would miss two darts for the title as he lost 6–5. The result saw him placed 24th on the Players Championship Order of Merit to qualify for the Finals, but he was defeated 6–4 by Rowby-John Rodriguez in the first round.

=== 2017 season ===
Huybrechts lost 3–0 to James Wade in the first round of the 2017 World Championship. At the fifth UK Open Qualifier he beat Gary Anderson, Terry Jenkins and Ian White all 6–5 in successive rounds and then threw the first nine-dart finish of his career during a 6–4 win over Darren Webster. Huybrechts reached the final by eliminating Michael Smith 6–5, but lost 6–3 to Simon Whitlock. Ronny briefly held the highest televised average of a Belgian player when he averaged 115.62 in the second round of the World Cup against Greece. However, a day later in the quarter-finals Kim averaged 121.97 against Singapore and the brothers went on to reach their third semi-final in a row, but were unable to win either of their singles matches against the Welsh team of Gerwyn Price and Mark Webster.

=== 2020-present ===
He lost his tourcard at the end of the 2019 season. He entered 2020 Q-school but was unable to secure a new tourcard. Nevertheless, Huybrechts qualified for both the Belgian and German Darts Championships where he lost in the second and first rounds respectively.

He entered 2021 and 2022 Q-school in a new bid to earn a tour card, but was again unsuccessful on both occasions. He spent the 2021 season competing on the PDC European Challenge tour.

During 2023 Q-school he was finally able to regain a two-year tour card.

== World Championship results ==
=== PDC ===
- 2014: First round (lost to Kim Huybrechts 1–3)
- 2015: Second round (lost to Peter Wright 1–4)
- 2016: Second round (lost to Peter Wright 0–4)
- 2017: First round (lost to James Wade 0–3)
- 2018: First round (lost to Daryl Gurney 1–3)

== Career finals ==
=== PDC team finals: 1 ===
Outcome	No.	Year	Championship	Team	Teammate	Opponents in the final	Score (Note: (m) = score in matches.)
Runner-up	1.	2013	World Cup of Darts	Belgium	Kim Huybrechts	England – Phil Taylor and Adrian Lewis	1–3 (m)

== Career statistics ==
=== BDO ===
Tournament	2005	2006	2008	2009	2010
BDO Ranked televised events
World Masters	1R	Prel.	1R	2R	1R

=== PDC ===
Tournament	2013	2014	2015	2016	2017	2018	2019	2023	2024
PDC Ranked televised events
World Championship	DNQ	1R	2R	2R	1R	1R	Did not qualify		
UK Open	3R	4R	2R	3R	3R	DNQ	3R	2R	3R
World Matchplay	1R	Did not qualify							
World Grand Prix	Did not qualify				1R	Did not qualify			
European Championship	SF	2R	DNQ		1R	Did not qualify			
Players Championship Finals	DNQ			1R	1R	Did not qualify			
PDC Non-ranked televised events
World Cup	F	QF	SF	SF	SF	Did not participate			
Grand Slam	2R	RR	Did not qualify						
Career statistics
Year-end ranking	45	36	40	44	41	52	81	136	115

==== European Tour ====
Season	1	2	3	4	5	6	7	8	9	10	11	12	13
2012	ADO; DNP	GDC; DNQ	EDO; 2R	GDM; DNP	DDM; 1R								
2013	UKM; DNQ	EDT; 1R	EDO; 1R	ADO; 1R	GDT; 1R	GDC; 1R	GDM; 1R	DDM; 2R					
2014	GDC; DNQ	DDM; 2R	GDM; 1R	ADO; DNQ	GDT; 1R	EDO; 1R	EDG; DNP	EDT; 2R					
2015	GDC; 2R	GDT; 1R	GDM; 2R	Did not qualify				EDM; 2R	EDG; DNQ				
2016	DDM; DNQ	GDM; 2R	Did not qualify				IDO; 2R	EDT; 1R	EDG; 1R	GDC; DNQ			
2017	GDC; DNQ	GDM; 1R	GDO; 2R	EDG; DNQ	GDT; 1R	EDM; DNQ	ADO; 2R	EDO; DNQ	DDM; 1R	GDG; 3R	IDO; 3R	EDT; DNQ	
2018	DNQ		GDO; 1R	ADO; 1R	Did not qualify				EDM; 1R	Did not qualify			
2020	BDC; 2R	GDC; 1R	DNQ										

==== Players Championships ====
Season	1	2	3	4	5	6	7	8	9	10	11	12	13	14	15	16	17	18	19	20	21	22	23	24	25	26	27	28	29	30
2013	WIG; F	WIG; 4R	WIG; 1R	WIG; 1R	CRA; 2R	CRA; 4R	BAR; 1R	BAR; 1R	DUB; 1R	DUB; 1R	KIL; 1R	KIL; 2R	WIG; 3R	WIG; 2R	BAR; 4R	BAR; 2R														
2014	BAR; 2R	BAR; 2R	CRA; 1R	CRA; 3R	WIG; 2R	WIG; 3R	WIG; 1R	WIG; 2R	CRA; 2R	CRA; 4R	COV; SF	COV; 1R	CRA; 1R	CRA; 3R	DUB; 2R	DUB; 2R	CRA; 2R	CRA; 1R	COV; 1R	COV; 1R										
2015	BAR; 2R	BAR; 1R	BAR; 1R	BAR; 1R	BAR; 3R	COV; 1R	COV; 2R	COV; 3R	CRA; 4R	CRA; 3R	BAR; DNP	BAR; DNP	WIG; 1R	WIG; 2R	BAR; 3R	BAR; QF	DUB; 1R	DUB; 1R	COV; 2R	COV; 4R										
2016	BAR; 2R	BAR; 2R	BAR; 3R	BAR; 3R	BAR; 4R	BAR; 2R	BAR; 1R	COV; 1R	COV; 2R	BAR; 1R	BAR; QF	BAR; 1R	BAR; 3R	BAR; 2R	BAR; 3R	BAR; 1R	DUB; 1R	DUB; F	BAR; 3R	BAR; 1R										
2017	BAR; 1R	BAR; 4R	BAR; 3R	BAR; 1R	MIL; 2R	MIL; 2R	BAR; 2R	BAR; 2R	WIG; 1R	WIG; 2R	MIL; 2R	MIL; 3R	WIG; 1R	WIG; 2R	BAR; 2R	BAR; 1R	BAR; 4R	BAR; 1R	DUB; 3R	DUB; 4R	BAR; 1R	BAR; 1R								
2018	BAR; 1R	BAR; 1R	BAR; 1R	BAR; 1R	MIL; 3R	MIL; 1R	BAR; 1R	BAR; 1R	WIG; 1R	WIG; 1R	MIL; 1R	MIL; 1R	WIG; 1R	WIG; 1R	BAR; 2R	BAR; 1R	BAR; 1R	BAR; 2R	DUB; 4R	DUB; 3R	BAR; 1R	BAR; 3R								
2019	WIG; 1R	WIG; 2R	WIG; 2R	WIG; 2R	BAR; 2R	BAR; 1R	WIG; 1R	WIG; 2R	BAR; 1R	BAR; 2R	BAR; 4R	BAR; 1R	BAR; 1R	BAR; 1R	BAR; 1R	BAR; 1R	WIG; 1R	WIG; 2R	BAR; 1R	BAR; 1R	HIL; 2R	HIL; 1R	BAR; 1R	BAR; 1R	BAR; 1R	BAR; 2R	DUB; 3R	DUB; 1R	BAR; 1R	BAR; 1R
2023	BAR; 1R	BAR; 1R	BAR; 1R	BAR; 3R	BAR; 1R	BAR; 2R	HIL; 1R	HIL; 1R	WIG; 1R	WIG; 3R	LEI; 1R	LEI; 1R	HIL; 1R	HIL; 1R	LEI; 1R	LEI; 4R	HIL; 3R	HIL; 2R	BAR; 4R	BAR; 2R	BAR; 1R	BAR; 1R	BAR; 2R	BAR; 1R	BAR; 1R	BAR; 2R	BAR; 1R	BAR; 2R	BAR; DNP	BAR; DNP
2024	WIG; DNP	WIG; DNP	LEI; 1R	LEI; 3R	HIL; 3R	HIL; 1R	LEI; DNP	LEI; DNP	HIL; 1R	HIL; 2R	HIL; 1R	HIL; 1R	MIL; 1R	MIL; 1R	MIL; 1R	MIL; 1R	MIL; 1R	Did not participate												

Performance Table Legend
W	Won the tournament	F	Finalist	SF	Semifinalist	QF	Quarterfinalist	#R; RR; Prel.	Lost in # round Round-robin; Preliminary round	DQ	Disqualified
DNQ	Did not qualify	DNP	Did not participate	WD	Withdrew	NH	Tournament not held	#R; RR; Prel.	Lost in # round Round-robin; Preliminary round	NYF	Not yet founded
