= Jason Hogg =

Scottish darts player

Personal information
- Nickname: "The Hedge"
- Born: 28 May 1982 (age 44) Aberdeen, Scotland
- Home town: Aberdeen, Scotland

Sport
- Sport: Darts
- Playing since: 2002
- Darts: 18 Gram
- Laterality: Right-handed
- Walk-on music: "Highway to Hell" by AC/DC

Organisation (see split in darts)
- BDO: 2011–2013
- PDC: 2013–2016
- WDF: 2025-

WDF major events – best performances
- World Masters: Last 264: 2011

PDC premier events – best performances
- World Championship: Last 64: 2015
- UK Open: Last 64: 2013, 2014

Other tournament wins
- Years
| PDC World Championship Qualifier | 2014 |

Jason Hogg (born 28 May 1982) is a Scottish former professional darts player.

== BDO career ==
Hogg took part in a few BDO tournaments. His biggest success was reaching the quarter-finals of the Granite City Open in 2011, where he lost to Ian White.

== PDC career ==
Hogg took part in the PDC Qualifying School in 2013. He didn't manage to win a Tour Card but as an associate PDPA member he took part in the UK Open qualifiers. Kim Huybrechts defeated him 6–3 in the quarter-finals of the seventh event, but Hogg went a stage further a day later at the final qualifier where he lost 6–3 to Mervyn King in the semi-finals. These results helped him finish 15th on the Order of Merit to enter the UK Open in the third round, but he suffered a heavy 9–1 loss to Kevin Painter.

Hogg did not take part in any other event during the rest of 2013, but did qualify for the 2014 UK Open and beat Wayne Jones 5–3 to reach the third round for the second successive year where Robert Thornton eliminated him 9–3. In December he won seven matches at the 2015 World Championship qualifier, concluding with a 5–2 success over Scott MacKenzie in the final. In Hogg's debut at the World Championship he faced Jamie Caven in the first round, with the match going into a deciding set which Hogg lost by three legs to one.

Hogg failed to qualify for the UK Open in February 2015 and did not play again until the 2016 World Championship qualifier. Hogg qualified for the 2016 UK Open as an amateur, but did not turn up for the event.

== World Championship results ==
=== PDC ===
- 2015: First round (lost to Jamie Caven 2–3)
