= Dean Winstanley =

English darts player

Personal information
- Nickname: Over the Top
- Born: 10 February 1981 (age 45) Swinton, South Yorkshire, England
- Home town: Buxton, Derbyshire, England

Sport
- Sport: Darts
- Playing since: 1983
- Darts: 24g Winmau Signature
- Laterality: Right-handed
- Walk-on music: "Like a Prayer" by Madonna

Organisation (see split in darts)
- BDO: 2008–2012, 2018–2019
- PDC: 2012–2016
- WDF: 2020–2022

WDF major events – best performances
- World Championship: Runner-up: 2011
- World Masters: Runner-up: 2011
- Finder Masters: Quarter-final: 2010, 2011

PDC premier events – best performances
- World Championship: Last 16: 2015
- World Matchplay: Last 16: 2012
- World Grand Prix: Last 16: 2014
- UK Open: Last 16: 2014
- Grand Slam: Semi-final: 2012
- European Championship: Last 32: 2014
- PC Finals: Quarter-final: 2014

Other tournament wins
- Years
Belgium Open	2010
British Classic	2011
Czech Open	2011
England Open	2010
German Open	2010

Dean Winstanley (born 10 February 1981) is an English former professional darts player.

He first took up darts as a two-year-old, stopped playing at the age of 12, and then started playing again when he was 22. He turned professional in 2008 and won his first event at the 2010 German Open.

== Darts career ==
=== BDO ===
Winstanley won the German Open, England Open, and Belgium Open in 2010. As a result of his performances on the BDO circuit, he qualified for the 2010 Winmau World Masters as the fourth seed. He defeated Stewart Rattray in the last 16 before losing to Martin McCloskey in the quarter-finals.

Winstanley also qualified for the 2011 World Championship as the third seed. In the first round, he survived two match darts against Martin Atkins before winning 3–2. He then defeated Robbie Green 4–1 in the second, Stephen Bunting 5–1 in the quarter-final and Jan Dekker 6–2 in the semi-finals, thus making him one of a small number of players to have reached the final at his first attempt. He was defeated 7–5 by Martin Adams in the final, having led 4–3 and 5–4. Later that year, Winstanley reached the final of the World Masters, where he was beaten 7–2 in sets by Scott Waites.

Winstanley qualified for the 2011 Grand Slam of Darts. He topped his group with victories over Ted Hankey, Ian White and Raymond van Barneveld. In the second round, he lost 10–9 to Mark Walsh having narrowly missed three match darts at 9–8 in front and a further two in the deciding leg.

Winstanley was seeded 3rd for the 2012 World Championship. He defeated Joey ten Berge 3–1 in the first round, before being defeated 4–3 by Alan Norris in the second round having led 3–1.

=== PDC ===
It was announced at the end of the 2012 BDO World Championship that Winstanley had entered the rival PDC's 'Q School' He beat Matt Clark 6–1 on the third day to earn a PDC Pro Tour card after earlier beating Dave Ladley, Kevin Dowling, Mareno Michels and Simon Craven. In April, he earned a place in the European Tour Event 1 in Vienna by defeating Gary Butcher in the UK qualifier. He enjoyed wins over Paul Nicholson and Jim Walker in the event, before losing in the third round 3–6 to Richie Burnett. Winstanley also qualified for the second European Tour event, with a win over Mark Jones in the UK qualifier. He played Mark Walsh in the first round of the event in Berlin, coming back from 2–5 down to triumph 6–5. In round two Winstanley was on the other end of a final leg decider, losing to Michael Mansell.

Winstanley's first PDC major was the UK Open, where he lost to an in-form Terry Jenkins 3–9 in the last 32. Winstanley's results during his first 6 months on the tour were good enough to seal a place in the World Matchplay due to his ranking on the ProTour Order of Merit. He faced Gary Anderson in the first round and came back from 0–5 down to win 13–11 and set up a last 16 meeting with Ronnie Baxter. There, Winstanley hit nine 180s, but only 25% of his doubles as he bowed out of the tournament with an 8–13 defeat. His doubles continued to prove a weakness in his game as he missed two for the match in a 2–3 loss to Dave Chisnall in his debut performance in the World Grand Prix.

Winstanley went into the last round of matches at the Grand Slam of Darts knowing a win over Simon Whitlock would secure his place in the knockout stages. He produced a superb performance to win 5–1 with a 100.63 average, before seeing off Arron Monk 10–5 and Kevin Painter 16–12 to reach his first PDC major semi-final. He faced Michael van Gerwen who started the match exceptionally by leading 5–0 and 10–1 and Winstanley could never catch up as he lost 8–16.

==== 2013 ====
His first year as a PDC player saw him finish 33rd on the ProTour Order of Merit after all 33 Players Championship, UK Open and European Tour Events had been played. This was enough to see him qualify for the World Championship as the third highest non-qualified player. The week before the tournament Winstanley practised intensely with five-time world champion Raymond van Barneveld, playing two four- to six-hour sessions a day at the Dutchman’s home with the players aiming to take out 5001 in 50 turns. Winstanley beat Mervyn King 3–2 in his debut, recovering from 1–2 down in sets and 0–2 in legs in the decider, also surviving one match dart to eventually win the final set 6–4. In his second round match, whilst trailing Vincent van der Voort 0–2 in sets and having won only one leg in the match, Winstanley hit his first televised nine-dart finish and the fifth in World Championship history. He eventually lost 2–4 having had darts at doubles to win both the fifth and sixth sets. Winstanley won the Best Newcomer at the annual PDC dinner in January 2013. His only quarter-final of 2013 came in May at the Players Championship One, where he lost 6–1 to Robert Thornton. Winstanley suffered a surprise 4–5 defeat to qualifier Dave Weston in the first round of the UK Open. Winstanley produced an encouraging 5–2 victory over Kim Huybrechts in his opening group game of the Grand Slam of Darts but followed it up with 5–1 and 5–3 defeats to Michael van Gerwen and Van der Voort to finish third and exit the tournament.

==== 2014 ====
He qualified for the 2014 World Championship through the 2013 ProTour Order of Merit and fell 2–0 down to Richie Burnett in the first round, before missing one dart to square the match at two sets all and was instead beaten 3–1. Winstanley was ranked world number 36 after the tournament. He enjoyed a good run at the UK Open by beating Andy Boulton 9–2 and reigning BDO world champion Stephen Bunting 9–6, before losing to Kevin Painter 9–5 in the fifth round. Later in the month he reached his first final since joining the PDC at the second Players Championship where he was beaten 6–1 by Michael van Gerwen.

Winstanley earned a place in the European Darts Trophy, where he overcame Gino Vos, Jamie Caven, Ian White and Peter Wright en route to reach his first appearance in the semi-finals of a European tour event, but lost there again against Michael van Gerwen. He defeated Michael Smith 2–1 in sets at the World Grand Prix, before being eliminated 3–1 by Van Gerwen in the second round. A first round exit at the European Championship followed and Winstanley was knocked out of the Grand Slam in the group stage after failing to win any of his three games. However, he found his form at the Players Championship Finals by averaging 103.94 in a 6–3 triumph over Simon Whitlock and then beat Jelle Klaasen 10–5 to play in his first major PDC quarter-final. He took an early 3–0 lead over Vincent van der Voort, but went on to lose 10–8.

==== 2015 ====
Winstanley secured narrow 3–2 and 4–3 wins over Wayne Jones and Darren Webster in the 2015 World Championship to reach the third round of the event for the first time. He dropped the first two sets without winning a leg against Vincent van der Voort, but improved to trail 3–2. Winstanley missed one dart to take the tie into a final set and was instead defeated 4–2. He lost 5–3 to William O'Connor in the second round of the UK Open. Winstanley did not qualify for the rest of the PDC majors in 2015 and could not get past the last 16 in any Pro Tour event.

==== 2016 ====
At 2–2 in sets and 4–4 in legs in their first round 2016 World Championship match, Ronny Huybrechts broke throw with a 164 finish with Winstanley waiting on 40 and then took out 104 to win in the next leg. He lost 9–3 to Vincent van der Voort in the third round of the UK Open. After this, Winstanley only reached the last 64 of five events and was beaten each time, eventually falling outside of the top 64 in the world.

On 15 November 2016, Winstanley was fined £3,000 and suspended from the PDC until May 2017 for posting a live recording of an event showing inappropriate behaviour. Having lost his PDC Tour Card, he was subsequently unable to enter the 2017 Q School.

== Personal life ==
Winstanley is a father of five. He is married to darts player Lorraine Winstanley.

== Career finals ==
=== BDO major finals: 2 (2 runners-up) ===
Legend
World Championship (0–1)
Winmau World Masters (0–1)

Outcome	No.	Year	Championship	Opponent in the final	Score
Runner-up	1.	2011	World Championship	(England) Martin Adams	5–7 (s)
Runner-up	2.	2011	Winmau World Masters	(England) Scott Waites	2–7 (s)

== World Championship results ==
=== BDO ===
- 2011: Runner-up (lost to Martin Adams 5–7)
- 2012: Second round (lost to Alan Norris 3–4)

=== PDC ===
- 2013: Second round (lost to Vincent van der Voort 2–4)
- 2014: First round (lost to Richie Burnett 1–3)
- 2015: Third round (lost to Vincent van der Voort 2–4)
- 2016: First round (lost to Ronny Huybrechts 2–3)

== Performance timeline ==
PDC

Tournament	2011	2012	2013	2014	2015	2016
World Championship	BDO		2R	1R	3R	1R
UK Open	DNQ	4R	1R	5R	2R	3R
World Matchplay	DNQ	2R	DNQ	1R	DNQ	
World Grand Prix	DNQ	1R	DNQ	2R	DNQ	
European Championship	DNQ			1R	DNQ	
Grand Slam	2R	SF	RR	RR	DNQ	
Players Championship Finals	DNQ			QF	DNQ	

== Nine-dart finishes ==
Dean Winstanley televised nine-dart finishes
Date	Opponent	Tournament	Method	Prize
23 December 2012	(Netherlands) Vincent van der Voort	PDC World Championship	3 x T20; 3 x T20; T20, T19, D12	£7,500
