= 2014 European Championship (darts) =

2014 888.com European Championship

Tournament information
- Dates: 24–26 October 2014
- Venue: RWE-Sporthalle
- Location: Mülheim
- Country: Germany
- Organisation(s): PDC
- Format: Legs
- Prize fund: £250,000
- Winner's share: £55,000
- Nine-dart finish: (Netherlands) Michael van Gerwen
- High checkout: 167 (Netherlands) Michael van Gerwen

Champion(s)
- (Netherlands) Michael van Gerwen

The 2014 888.com European Championship was the seventh edition of the Professional Darts Corporation tournament, the European Championship, which sees the top European players to compete against the highest ranked players from the PDC Order of Merit. The tournament took place from 24–26 October 2014 at the RWE-Sporthalle in Mülheim, Germany.

Adrian Lewis was the defending champion, having beaten Simon Whitlock in the final of the 2013 tournament, but he lost in the first round to Jelle Klaasen.

En route to the final, Michael van Gerwen hit a nine-dart finish in his semi-final match against Raymond van Barneveld. He went on to win the tournament, securing his first European Championship title, after beating Terry Jenkins 11–4.

== Prize money ==
The 2014 European Championship had a total prize fund of £250,000, a £50,000 increase since the previous staging of the tournament. The following is the breakdown of the fund:

Position (no. of players)		Prize money (Total: £250,000)
Winner	(1)	£55,000
Runner-Up	(1)	£25,000
Semi-finalists	(2)	£15,000
Quarter-finalists	(4)	£10,000
Last 16 (second round)	(8)	£6,500
Last 32 (first round)	(16)	£3,000

== Qualification ==
The top 16 players from the PDC Order of Merit on 13 October automatically qualified for the event. The top eight non-qualified players from the Pro Tour Order of Merit were added to the tournament. The remaining places were filled by European qualifiers, with the top seven players from the European Order of Merit and a Scandinavian qualifier. The top eight from the PDC Order of Merit were seeded in the tournament.

These were the participants:

PDC Top 16
1. (Netherlands) Michael van Gerwen (champion)
2. (England) Phil Taylor (second round)
3. (England) Adrian Lewis (first round)
4. (Scotland) Peter Wright (quarter-finals)
5. (Australia) Simon Whitlock (first round)
6. (England) James Wade (first round)
7. (Scotland) Gary Anderson (first round)
8. (England) Dave Chisnall (quarter-finals)
9. (Scotland) Robert Thornton (second round)
10. (England) Andy Hamilton (first round)
11. (Northern Ireland) Brendan Dolan (second round)
12. (England) Mervyn King (semi-finals)
13. (England) Justin Pipe (first round)
14. (England) Wes Newton (first round)
15. (Belgium) Kim Huybrechts (second round)
16. (Netherlands) Raymond van Barneveld (semi-finals)

Pro Tour Order of Merit qualifiers
1. (England) Michael Smith (first round)
2. (England) Ian White (second round)
3. (Netherlands) Vincent van der Voort (second round)
4. (England) Steve Beaton (first round)
5. (England) Jamie Caven (second round)
6. (England) Terry Jenkins (runner-up)
7. (England) Stephen Bunting (quarter-finals)
8. (England) Dean Winstanley (first round)

European qualifiers
1. (Netherlands) Jelle Klaasen (quarter-finals)
2. (Belgium) Ronny Huybrechts (second round)
3. (Netherlands) Benito van de Pas (first round)
4. (Netherlands) Christian Kist (first round)
5. (Austria) Mensur Suljović (first round)
6. (Austria) Rowby-John Rodriguez (first round)
7. (Germany) Jyhan Artut (first round)
Scandinavian Qualifier
1. (Norway) Robert Wagner (first round)

== Draw ==
The draw was held on 12 October 2014.

First round (best of 11 legs); 24 October
1	(Netherlands) Michael van Gerwen 92.77	6
(England) Justin Pipe 88.28	3
(Northern Ireland) Brendan Dolan 104.68	6
(England) Michael Smith 86.43	2
8	(England) Dave Chisnall 89.59	6
(Germany) Jyhan Artut 87.97	4
(England) Wes Newton 85.74	1
(England) Ian White 98.72	6
5	(Australia) Simon Whitlock 86.20	4
(Netherlands) Raymond van Barneveld 93.25	6
(Netherlands) Vincent van der Voort 101.09	6
(Norway) Robert Wagner 100.59	2
4	(Scotland) Peter Wright 93.54	6
(Netherlands) Benito van de Pas 91.01	5
(Belgium) Kim Huybrechts 88.23	6
(England) Dean Winstanley 91.41	5
2	(England) Phil Taylor 90.19	6
(England) Steve Beaton 92.21	2
(England) Andy Hamilton 91.75	1
(England) Stephen Bunting 102.68	6
7	(Scotland) Gary Anderson 95.72	5
(England) Terry Jenkins 100.06	6
(Scotland) Robert Thornton 91.36	6
(Austria) Rowby-John Rodriguez 93.52	2
6	(England) James Wade 88.00	4
(Belgium) Ronny Huybrechts 91.39	6
(England) Mervyn King 91.64	6
(Netherlands) Christian Kist 90.97	5
3	(England) Adrian Lewis 87.51	4
(Netherlands) Jelle Klaasen 92.07	6
(England) Jamie Caven 95.03	6
(Austria) Mensur Suljović 91.41	2

Second round (best of 19 legs); 25 October
1	(Netherlands) Michael van Gerwen 103.32	10
(Northern Ireland) Brendan Dolan 99.78	8
8	(England) Dave Chisnall 96.68	10
(England) Ian White 92.58	9
(Netherlands) Raymond van Barneveld 94.33	10
(Netherlands) Vincent van der Voort 98.94	7
4	(Scotland) Peter Wright 97.08	10
(Belgium) Kim Huybrechts 93.04	5
2	(England) Phil Taylor 102.13	9
(England) Stephen Bunting 102.21	10
(England) Terry Jenkins 95.83	10
(Scotland) Robert Thornton 93.27	8
(Belgium) Ronny Huybrechts 89.60	7
(England) Mervyn King 98.55	10
(Netherlands) Jelle Klaasen 97.02	10
(England) Jamie Caven 90.55	7

Quarter-finals (best of 19 legs); 26 October
1	(Netherlands) Michael van Gerwen 111.00	10
8	(England) Dave Chisnall 100.98	5
(Netherlands) Raymond van Barneveld 97.53	10
4	(Scotland) Peter Wright 100.26	7
(England) Stephen Bunting 95.29	7
(England) Terry Jenkins 97.59	10
(England) Mervyn King 90.68	10
(Netherlands) Jelle Klaasen 89.62	5

Semi-finals (best of 21 legs); 26 October
1	(Netherlands) Michael van Gerwen 103.56	11
(Netherlands) Raymond van Barneveld 92.55	6
(England) Terry Jenkins 95.20	11
(England) Mervyn King 88.54	8

Final (best of 21 legs); 26 October
1	(Netherlands) Michael van Gerwen 98.16	11
(England) Terry Jenkins 92.90	4

== Broadcasting ==
On 14 June 2013, the PDC announced that the European Championship would be broadcast in the United Kingdom on ITV4 for the next three years. The tournament was available in the following countries on these channels:

Country	Channel
United Kingdom	ITV4
Netherlands	RTL 7
Germany	Sport1/Sport1+
(Republic of Ireland) Ireland	Setanta Sports
Middle East	OSN
Australia	Fox Sports
New Zealand	Sky Sport (New Zealand)
United States	ESPN
