= 2013 European Championship (darts) =

2013 PartyPoker.net European Championship

Tournament information
- Dates: 4–7 July 2013
- Venue: RWE-Sporthalle
- Location: Mülheim
- Country: Germany
- Organisation(s): PDC
- Format: Legs
- Prize fund: £200,000
- Winner's share: £50,000
- High checkout: 170 (Canada) John Part

Champion(s)
- (England) Adrian Lewis

The 2013 PartyPoker.net European Championship was the sixth edition of the Professional Darts Corporation tournament, the European Championship, which allows the top European players to compete against the highest ranked players from the PDC Order of Merit. The tournament took place from 4–7 July at the RWE-Sporthalle in Mülheim, Germany.

The defending champion, Simon Whitlock, pulled off an incredible comeback in his quarter-final match against Jamie Caven to win 10–9 having been 3–9 down. He advanced to the final once more where he faced Adrian Lewis. Lewis won his third major title by defeating the Australian 11–6.

== Prize money ==
The 2013 European Championship has a total prize fund of £200,000. The following is the breakdown of the fund:

Position (no. of players)		Prize money (Total: £200,000)
Winner	(1)	£50,000
Runner-Up	(1)	£20,000
Semi-finalists	(2)	£10,000
Quarter-finalists	(4)	£7,500
Last 16 (second round)	(8)	£5,000
Last 32 (first round)	(16)	£2,500

== Qualification ==
The top 16 players from the PDC Order of Merit on 23 June automatically qualified for the event. The top eight from them were also the seeded players. The remaining 16 places went to the top eight non-qualified players from the PDC Pro Tour Order of Merit, with further places awarded to the top seven non-qualified players from the Continental Europe Order of Merit and the leader of the Scandinavian Order of Merit after four of eight events. Gary Anderson withdrew before the event began due to illness so Mark Webster took his place due to being the next non-qualified player from the PDC Order of Merit.

These are the participants:

PDC Top 16
1. (England) Phil Taylor (second round)
2. (Netherlands) Michael van Gerwen (semi-finals)
3. (England) Adrian Lewis (champion)
4. (England) James Wade (second round)
5. (Australia) Simon Whitlock (runner-up)
6. (England) Andy Hamilton (quarter-finals)
7. (England) Wes Newton (first round)
8. (Netherlands) Raymond van Barneveld (second round)
9. (England) Justin Pipe (second round)
10. (England) Dave Chisnall (first round)
11. (Scotland) Robert Thornton (quarter-finals)
12. (England) Kevin Painter (second round)
13. (England) Mervyn King (second round)
14. (Belgium) Kim Huybrechts (first round)
15. (Northern Ireland) Brendan Dolan (first round)
16. (England) Terry Jenkins (first round)

Pro Tour Order of Merit qualifiers
1. (England) Jamie Caven (quarter-finals)
2. (Scotland) Peter Wright (first round)
3. (Canada) John Part (first round)
4. (England) Stuart Kellett (first round)
5. (Australia) Paul Nicholson (second round)
6. (Scotland) ~~Gary Anderson (withdrew)~~
7. (England) Ronnie Baxter (first round)
8. (England) Colin Lloyd (second round)
9. (Wales) Mark Webster (first round)

European qualifiers
1. (Austria) Mensur Suljović (first round)
2. (Netherlands) Jelle Klaasen (quarter-finals)
3. (Germany) Tomas Seyler (first round)
4. (Germany) Max Hopp (first round)
5. (Belgium) Kurt van de Rijck (first round)
6. (Belgium) Ronny Huybrechts (semi-finals)
7. (Netherlands) Vincent van der Voort (first round)
SDC Order of Merit
1. (Finland) Jani Haavisto (first round)

== Draw ==
The draw was held on 23 June 2013.

First round (best of 11 legs); 4–5 July
1	(England) Phil Taylor 96.24	6
(Netherlands) Vincent van der Voort 92.77	3
(England) Stuart Kellett 93.77	3
(Belgium) Ronny Huybrechts 100.97	6
8	(Netherlands) Raymond van Barneveld 87.28	6
(Germany) Tomas Seyler 81.61	1
(Scotland) Robert Thornton 95.05	6
(Northern Ireland) Brendan Dolan 88.85	2
5	(Australia) Simon Whitlock 94.93	6
(Belgium) Kim Huybrechts 94.31	4
(England) Colin Lloyd 100.65	6
(Scotland) Peter Wright 98.46	4
4	(England) James Wade 95.41	6
(Wales) Mark Webster 91.10	2
(England) Jamie Caven 106.09	6
(England) Dave Chisnall 96.04	0
2	(Netherlands) Michael van Gerwen 86.19	6
(Belgium) Kurt van de Rijck 75.78	1
(England) Ronnie Baxter 87.17	5
(England) Mervyn King 88.18	6
7	(England) Wes Newton 92.88	4
(Netherlands) Jelle Klaasen 93.10	6
(Finland) Jani Haavisto 90.73	3
(England) Justin Pipe 93.92	6
6	(England) Andy Hamilton 89.00	6
(England) Terry Jenkins 88.98	5
(Germany) Max Hopp 79.07	4
(Australia) Paul Nicholson 88.23	6
3	(England) Adrian Lewis 90.22	6
(Austria) Mensur Suljović 90.83	4
(England) Kevin Painter 94.91	6
(Canada) John Part 91.33	4

Second round (best of 19 legs); 6 July
1	(England) Phil Taylor 95.51	5
(Belgium) Ronny Huybrechts 95.54	10
8	(Netherlands) Raymond van Barneveld 95.57	9
(Scotland) Robert Thornton 93.42	10
5	(Australia) Simon Whitlock 99.52	10
(England) Colin Lloyd 92.69	6
4	(England) James Wade 92.78	2
(England) Jamie Caven 99.44	10
2	(Netherlands) Michael van Gerwen 104.87	10
(England) Mervyn King 91.41	3
(Netherlands) Jelle Klaasen 103.76	10
(England) Justin Pipe 98.01	6
6	(England) Andy Hamilton 89.74	10
(Australia) Paul Nicholson 87.19	8
3	(England) Adrian Lewis 100.34	10
(England) Kevin Painter 90.35	4

Quarter-finals (best of 19 legs); 7 July
(Belgium) Ronny Huybrechts 93.46	10
(Scotland) Robert Thornton 94.27	9
5	(Australia) Simon Whitlock 96.33	10
(England) Jamie Caven 95.31	9
2	(Netherlands) Michael van Gerwen 104.77	10
(Netherlands) Jelle Klaasen 99.68	7
6	(England) Andy Hamilton 93.51	3
3	(England) Adrian Lewis 102.57	10

Semi-finals (best of 21 legs); 7 July
(Belgium) Ronny Huybrechts 94.86	7
5	(Australia) Simon Whitlock 96.14	11
2	(Netherlands) Michael van Gerwen 99.05	8
3	(England) Adrian Lewis 100.34	11

Final (best of 21 legs); 7 July
5	(Australia) Simon Whitlock 99.59	6
3	(England) Adrian Lewis 103.34	11

== Broadcasting ==
On 14 June 2013, the PDC announced that the European Championship would be broadcast in the United Kingdom on ITV4 for the next three years. It was also shown on RTL 7 in the Netherlands, Sport1 in Germany, Fox Sports in Australia and on Sky New Zealand.
