= Jani Haavisto =

Finnish darts player

Personal information
- Nickname: The Finnisher
- Born: 11 May 1987 (age 39) Finland
- Home town: Teuva, Finland

Sport
- Sport: Darts
- Playing since: 2007
- Darts: 24g Unicorn
- Laterality: Right-handed
- Walk-on music: "Ring of Fire" by Johnny Cash

Organisation (see split in darts)
- BDO: 2011–2012
- PDC: 2012–2018, 2026–
- Current world ranking: (PDC) 155 (18 October 2026)

PDC premier events – best performances
- World Championship: Last 64: 2013
- European Championship: Last 32: 2013

Other tournament wins
- Years
| Revontuli Open | 2013 |
PDC Nordic & Baltic (was SDC) Pro Tour
| SDC Denmark | 2012, 2013 |
| SDC Finland | 2013, 2014 |
| SDC Sweden | 2012, 2013, 2014 |
| PDC N&B Latvia | 2026 |

Jani Haavisto (born 11 May 1987) is a Finnish professional darts player.

== Career ==
Haavisto won two events on the Professional Darts Corporation's Scandinavian Tour in 2012, finishing second in the Order of Merit to qualify for the 2013 PDC World Darts Championship. He defeated compatriot Jarkko Komula in the preliminary round, before being beaten 1–3 in sets by Gary Anderson in the first round, receiving praise for his high-scoring.

Haavisto entered Q School in an attempt to win a PDC Pro Tour Card to play the full circuit in 2013 and 2014, and secured it on the second day by beating Colin Fowler 6–4 in his final round match. He played in his first World Cup of Darts in February with Jarkko Komula and qualified from Group F courtesy of a 5–4 win over the US and then shocked the Dutch pair of Raymond van Barneveld and Michael van Gerwen, both of whom had won major titles in 2012, with a 5–3 victory in the last 16. They then defeated the host nation Germany in the quarter-finals to face the Belgian brothers Ronny and Kim Huybrechts in the semi-finals. Haavisto lost to Kim 1–4, but Komula beat Ronny meaning a doubles match was required to settle the tie. However, they were whitewashed 0–4 to exit the tournament.

Haavisto won the first Scandinavian Tour event of 2013 in Finland beating Ulf Ceder 6–0 in the final. He also won the third event with a 6–3 victory over Per Laursen in the final. After four events he was top of the SDC Order of Merit which earned him a place in the European Championship for the first time. Haavisto faced Justin Pipe in the first round and was defeated 6–3. In the final of the Scandinavian qualifier for the 2014 World Championship, Haavisto was edged out 6–5 by Dennis Lindskjold. Haavisto and Komula squandered a 3–1 lead in the first round of the World Cup of Darts against Poland as they suffered a shock 5–4 defeat. Haavisto won twice on the 2014 Scandinavian Pro Tour to top the Order of Merit which earned him a place in the 2015 Darts Championship. He was beaten 4–1 in legs by John Michael in the preliminary round. Haavisto only played in one other event during the whole of 2015.

Haavisto returned to PDC darts in 2026 after an absence of eight years. He qualified for the 2026 Belgian Darts Open after beating Andreas Harrysson 6–1 in the final of the event's Nordic & Baltic Qualifier, and also won the Nordic & Baltic Pro Tour Event 2 with a 6–4 victory over Oskar Lukasiak.

== World Championship results ==
=== PDC ===
- 2013: First round (lost to Gary Anderson 1–3)
- 2015: Preliminary round (lost to John Michael 1–4 in legs)
