= Nolan Arendse =

South African darts player (born 1968)

Personal information
- Nickname: The Nigel
- Born: 16 December 1968 (age 57) Cape Town, South Africa
- Home town: Cape Town

Sport
- Sport: Darts
- Playing since: 1995
- Darts: 22 Gram Unicorn
- Laterality: Right-handed
- Walk-on music: "Spirit in the Sky" by Norman Greenbaum

Organisation (see split in darts)
- PDC: 2007–2018

PDC premier events – best performances
- World Championship: Last 64: 2015

Other tournament wins
- Years
PDC World South Africa Qualifying Event	2014

Nolan Arendse (born 16 December 1968) is a former South African professional darts player.

== Career ==
Arendse failed to qualify for the 2008 and 2010 PDC World Darts Championships. In 2010 he was diagnosed with a hypothyroidism which forced him to give up darts for 18 months due to being partly paralysed. Two of his vertebrae were then crushed in a car accident after which Arendse had to wear a body brace for six months. Soon afterwards he suffered a heart attack.

Arendse lost in the final of the 2013 SAPDO 501 Double Away to Charles Losper. He won the 2014 South African Masters by beating Devon Petersen 9–5 to qualify for the 2015 PDC World Darts Championship. Arendse needed two doctors' letters to get his daily medicine through customs at Heathrow Airport. After defeating Alex Hon in the preliminary round, he lost 3–0 in sets in the first round to Brendan Dolan without picking up a leg. In January 2015, he played in the PDC Qualifying School but a single last 32 appearance out of the four days was not enough to earn him a tour card. He has not played in an event since.

== World Championship Results ==
=== PDC ===
- 2015: First round: (lost to Brendan Dolan 0–3)
