= Mark McGrath (darts player) =

Personal information
- Nickname: The Cowboy
- Born: 15 July 1968 (age 58) Leeds, England
- Home town: Rongotea, New Zealand

Sport
- Sport: Darts
- Playing since: 1988
- Darts: 25 Gram
- Laterality: Right-handed
- Walk-on music: "Cowboy Up" by Dry County

Organisation (see split in darts)
- BDO: 1995, 2002–2020
- WDF: 2002–

WDF major events – best performances
- World Championship: Last 32: 2017, 2019
- World Masters: Last 16: 2017
- World Trophy: Semi Final: 2019

PDC premier events – best performances
- World Championship: Last 72: 2015

Other tournament wins
- Years
Alan King Memorial	2016
DPNZ King Country Open	2012
DPNZ Tararua Open	2014
New Zealand Masters	2016
PDC World New Zealand Qualifying Event	2014
Canterbury Classic	2018
Canterbury Open	2018
Auckland Open	2018
New Zealand Open	2019

Mark McGrath (born July 15, 1968) is an English-born New Zealand professional darts player.

== Career ==
McGrath qualified for the 2015 PDC World Darts Championship after winning the New Zealand Qualifier. He was whitewashed 4–0 by American Scott Kirchner in the preliminary round.

In 2016, McGrath claimed the New Zealand Masters and Alan King Memorial titles. McGrath qualified for the 2017 BDO World Darts Championship McGrath beat Roger Janssen 3-2 before losing 3–0 to the current World Champion Scott Mitchell. In 2018 McGrath won the Canterbury Classic and the Canterbury Open, McGrath also won The Auckland Open. McGrath also qualified for the 2018 Auckland Darts Masters he beat Michael Smith 6-4 before losing 10–4 to Raymond Van Barneveld. McGrath is the only person from New Zealand to have won a game at The Auckland Darts Masters. McGrath qualified for The 2019 BDO World Darts Championship (His third world championship). At The 2019 BDO World Championship McGrath beat Adam Smith-Neale the reigning Winmau World Masters Champion 3-0 McGrath then went on to lose 3–0 to reigning BDO World Champion Glen Durrant in the last 32. McGrath also won the New Zealand Open defeating AJ te Kira. McGrath was the New Zealand qualifier for the 2019 BDO World Darts Trophy where he reached the semi-finals and beat current BDO number one Wesley Harms this was the first time a New Zealander had reached a major televised darts semi-final. McGrath also represented New Zealand at the 2019 WDF World Cup in Romania

== World Championship results ==
=== PDC ===
- 2015: Last 72 (lost to Scott Kirchner 0–4) (legs)

=== BDO ===
- 2017: 1st Round (lost to Scott Mitchell 0–3)
- 2019: 1st Round (lost to Glen Durrant 0–3)

== Personal life ==
McGrath was born and raised in Leeds until his family emigrated to New Zealand in 1981. Went to Horowhenua College until 1986, where he was nicknamed Paddy due to his thick leeds accent. Married to Colette McGrath, 23 February 2013. McGrath has two children Jessica, Connor and Colette has 2 children Tayla, Brooke. McGrath works as Baker for his job. In his spare time he goes Jetski fishing. He is a member of Team Cowboy and his major sponsors are DartsNz.co.Nz, R J Roofing. He supports Leeds United.
