= Sascha Stein =

German darts player

Personal information
- Nickname: "Stoiner"
- Born: 19 October 1984 (age 42) Germany
- Home town: Birkenau, Germany

Sport
- Sport: Darts
- Playing since: 2003
- Darts: 23g
- Laterality: Right-handed
- Walk-on music: "Forever and Always" by Bullet for My Valentine

Organisation (see split in darts)
- PDC: 2013–2017

PDC premier events – best performances
- World Championship: Last 32: 2015

Sascha Stein (born 19 October 1984) is a German former professional darts player who played in Professional Darts Corporation (PDC) events.

== Career ==
In November 2014, Stein lost in the final of the Bulls Superleague qualifier for the 2015 PDC World Darts Championship 8–10 to Max Hopp. However, Hopp subsequently qualified through the PDC Pro Tour Order of Merit so Stein took his place in the preliminary round where he beat Finland's Kim Viljanen 4–1. Stein then eliminated Stuart Kellett 3–1 in the first round with both players averaging in the 70's to set up a meeting with world number one and reigning champion Michael van Gerwen. Despite taking the first set, Stein was beaten 1–4.

Stein attempted to earn a PDC tour card in 2015 at Qualifying School, but could not win past the last 64 on any of the four days. He qualified for the German Darts Championship and was defeated 4–6 by Andy Parsons in the opening round.

== World Championship results ==
=== PDC ===
- 2015: Second round (lost to Michael van Gerwen 1–4) (sets)
