= Stuart Kellett =

English darts player

Personal information
- Nickname: "KO"
- Born: 12 August 1981 (age 45) Northwich, Cheshire, England
- Home town: Denton, Greater Manchester, England

Sport
- Sport: Darts
- Playing since: 2002
- Darts: 23g Red Dragon Signature
- Laterality: Right-handed
- Walk-on music: "A-Punk" by Vampire Weekend

Organisation (see split in darts)
- BDO: 2006–2012
- PDC: 2012–2019; 2023

WDF major events – best performances
- World Championship: Last 16: 2011
- World Masters: Runner-up: 2010
- Finder Masters: Quarter-final: 2010

PDC premier events – best performances
- World Championship: Last 64: 2013, 2014, 2015
- World Matchplay: Last 32: 2013
- World Grand Prix: Last 32: 2013
- UK Open: Last 16: 2016
- Grand Slam: Group Stage: 2013
- European Championship: Last 32: 2013
- PC Finals: Last 32: 2013

Other tournament wins
- Years
Antwerp Open	2010
Cheshire Open	2009
Manchester Darts Classic	2011
PDC World Championship Qualifiers	2012
Scottish Open	2010

Other achievements
- 2014 Breaks into the world's top 32 for the first time

Stuart Kellett (born 12 August 1981) is an English darts player.

== BDO career ==
Kellett reached the last 16 of the 2007 World Masters, having beaten Andy Fordham among others on the way to the televised stages. He lost 1-3 in sets to the then BDO world champion Martin Adams.

He also qualified for the 2008 Zuiderduin Masters, losing both of his group games to Mareno Michels and Darryl Fitton.

In 2010, Kellett won both the Scottish Open and the Antwerp Open. His good run of form helped him to qualify for the 2010 World Masters as the second seed. He knocked out Tony West in the last 16, before defeating Ted Hankey and Martin Phillips (both in sudden-death legs) to reach the final. He lost 3-7 to Adams, who won his third consecutive World Masters title.

Kellett also qualified for the 2011 BDO World Darts Championship, again as the second seed. He defeated two-time semi-finalist and pub teammate Darryl Fitton 3-0 in the first round, losing just one leg along the way. Bookmakers slashed his odds of winning the championship from 16/1 to 9/2 after this performance, but he was unable to produce the same standard against Jan Dekker in the second round and lost 4-1. During this tournament commentators and pundits began affectionately referring to Kellett as the 'cocky craftsman' (in a nod to Eric Bristow), due to his confidence on-stage in comparison to his otherwise humble nature off it.

Kellett's form took a dip after his loss to Dekker, as he dropped out of the world's top 16 and failed to qualify for the 2011 Masters or the 2012 World Championship.

== PDC career ==
In January 2012, Kellett successfully earned a Professional Darts Corporation tour card on day two of the PDC's Pro Tour 'Q School' qualifying tournament. In June, he qualified for the 2012 European Darts Open after defeating Nigel Heydon and William O'Connor in the UK qualifier. Kellett played Mervyn King in the first round in Düsseldorf and lost 3–6. He also reached the fourth 2012 German Darts Masters and beat Colin Lloyd 6–4 in the first round in Stuttgart. Kellett faced Vincent van der Voort in the second round and lost 5–6. Kellett won the PDC World Championship qualifier in November, beating John Bowles 5–1 in the final, seeing off a total of seven players during the event to reach the World Championship for the first time. He lost to van der Voort in the first round, missing a total of 21 darts at a double, and was ranked world number 66 after the event.

Kellett reached his first PDC final in March at the first European Tour event of the year, the UK Masters. He overcame Peter Wright, Colin Lloyd, Dave Chisnall, Robert Thornton and Andy Hamilton en route to the final, where he lost 6–4 to three-time world champion John Part. The runner-up's cheque of £10,000 is the biggest of this career to date. Kellett saw off the likes of Hamilton and Ronnie Baxter to progress to the semi-finals of Players Championship 2. There he beat Phil Taylor 6–4, before losing 6–1 to Michael van Gerwen in the final. Kellett suffered a 9–3 defeat to Jelle Klaasen in the fourth round of the UK Open. Kellett qualified for the World Matchplay for the first time, but was thrashed 10–1 by Phil Taylor in the first round, averaging just 75.82 in the process. He also made his debut at the World Grand Prix and missed one dart for the first set in the opening round against Raymond van Barneveld and was beaten 2–0. Kellett won a qualifying place for the Grand Slam of Darts by beating Steve Brown 5–3 and was whitewashed 5–0 by Taylor in his opening Group A game. However, he then came back from 4–2 down against Kevin Painter to win 5–4, Kellett's first televised success since joining the PDC. He went into his final match knowing a win over Paul Nicholson would see him advance to the last 16, but he was beaten 5–2 to finish third in the group. Kellett earned over £30,000 in ProTour events during 2013 to finish 18th on the ProTour Order of Merit and qualify for the Players Championship Finals for the first time. He played in a last leg decider against Gary Anderson, having led 4–1, and missed a dart at tops to complete a 120 finish for the match to lose 6–5.

He took the first of sixteen spots available to non-qualified players through the 2013 ProTour Order of Merit for the 2014 World Championship and faced Paul Nicholson in the first round, losing 3–0. He entered the top 32 in the world rankings after the event. Kellett was beaten 9–4 by Terry Jenkins in the third round of the UK Open and failed to qualify for another PDC major during the rest of the year. His only quarter-final appearance came at Players Championship 12 where he lost 6–1 to Michael van Gerwen.

Kellett suffered a 3–1 defeat in the first round of the 2015 World Championship to qualifier Sascha Stein with an average of just 73.08. He whitewashed Robbie Green 5–0 at the UK Open, before being eliminated 5–1 by Joe Murnan in the second round. Kellett's only run to the last 16 of a Pro Tour event this year came at the Players Championship 12, where he lost 6–5 to Dirk van Duijvenbode. He did come within a match of qualifying for at least the preliminary round of the 2016 World Championship, but was defeated 5–1 by Andy Boulton.

At the 2016 UK Open Kellett defeated Nathan Aspinall 6–5, Joey ten Berge 9–7 and Michael Smith 9–5 to reach the fifth round of the event for the first time, but lost 9–5 to amateur Barry Lynn. He failed to carry this last 16 showing into the rest of the year though, as he was knocked out in the first round of two European Tour events and reached the last 32 of three Players Championship tournaments, but lost each time. Kellett was ranked world number 72 after the 2017 World Championship and therefore entered Q School in an attempt to win his tour place back. He was within two matches of doing so on the fourth day, but lost 5–4 to Kirk Shepherd.

Kellett had his best finish for almost three years when he reached the quarter-finals of the eighth Players Championship in April 2017. He had wins over Dirk van Duijvenbode, Warrick Scheffer, James Wilson and Raymond van Barneveld, before losing 6–4 to Daryl Gurney.

== Personal life ==
Kellett worked as a web designer before becoming a full-time darts player.

== World Championship results ==
=== BDO ===
- 2011: Second round (lost to Jan Dekker 1–4)

=== PDC ===
- 2013: First round (lost to Vincent van der Voort 0–3)
- 2014: First round (lost to Paul Nicholson 0–3)
- 2015: First round (lost to Sascha Stein 1–3)

== Career finals ==
=== PDC European tour finals: 1 ===
Legend
Other (0–1)

Outcome	No.	Year	Championship	Opponent in the final	Score
Runner-up	1.	2013	UK Masters	John Part	4–6 (l)
