= 2017 PDC Pro Tour =

Darts tournaments

The 2017 PDC Pro Tour was a series of non-televised darts tournaments organised by the Professional Darts Corporation (PDC). Players Championships, UK Open Qualifiers and European Tour events were the events that made up the Pro Tour. There were 40 PDC Pro Tour events held – 22 Players Championships, six UK Open Qualifiers and 12 European Tour events.

== Prize money ==
Prize money for each European Tour event increased from £115,000 to £135,000. The UK Open Qualifiers and Players Championship events stayed the same as 2016.

This is how the prize money was divided:

Stage	ET	PC	UKQ	CT/DT
Winner	£25,000	£10,000	£10,000	£2,000
Runner-up	£10,000	£6,000	£5,000	£1,000
Semi-finalists	£6,000	£3,000	£2,500	£500
Quarter-finalists	£4,000	£2,250	£2,000	£300
Last 16	£3,000	£1,500	£1,500	£200
Last 32	£2,000	£1,000	£750	£100
Last 48	£1,000	N/A	N/A	N/A
Last 64	N/A	£500	£250	£50
Total	£135,000	£75,000	£60,000	£10,000

== PDC Tour Card ==
128 players are granted Tour Cards, which enables them to participate in all Players Championships, UK Open Qualifiers and European Tour events.

=== Tour cards ===
The 2017 Tour Cards were awarded to:

- (64) The top 64 players from the PDC Order of Merit after the 2017 World Championship.
- (32) The 32 2016/17 Tour Card Holders not ranked in the top 64 of the PDC Order of Merit following the World Championship.
- (2) Two highest qualifiers from 2016 Challenge Tour (Rob Cross and Ryan Searle).
- (2) Two highest qualifiers from 2016 Development Tour (~~Dean Reynolds~~ (Note: Dean Reynolds turned down his Tour Card, which was subsequently awarded to Aden Kirk.) and Ross Twell).
- (16) The 16 qualifiers from 2017 Q-School.

Afterwards, the playing field was complemented by the highest qualified players from the Q School Order of Merit until the maximum number of 128 Pro Tour Card players had been reached. In 2017, that means that a total of 12 players qualified this way.

=== Q-School ===
The PDC Pro Tour Qualifying School takes place at the Robin Park Tennis Centre in Wigan from January 19–22. The following players won two-year tour cards on each of the days played:

January 19	January 20	January 21	January 22
Prakash Jiwa; Lee Bryant; Stephen Burton; Jim Brown	Richard North; Ritchie Edhouse; Royden Lam; Maik Langendorf	Scott Taylor; Richie Burnett; John Part; Steve Lennon	Martin Schindler; Kirk Shepherd; Toni Alcinas; Paul Nicholson
431 contestants	422 contestants	406 contestants	385 contestants

A Q School Order of Merit was also created by using the following points system:

Stage	Points
Last 8	9
Last 16	5
Last 32	3
Last 64	2
Last 128	1

To complete the field of 128 Tour Card Holders, places were allocated down the final Qualifying School Order of Merit. The following players picked up Tour Cards as a result:

1. Jamie Bain
2. Jimmy Hendriks
3. Ronnie Baxter
4. Steve Hine
5. Sven Groen
6. Paul Rowley
7. Scott Darbyshire
8. Mickey Mansell
9. Chris Quantock
10. John Norman Jnr
11. Darren Johnson
12. Madars Razma

== UK Open Qualifiers ==
As with recent years, 6 qualifiers took place to determine seedings for the 2017 UK Open.

No.	Date	Venue	Winner	Score	Runner-up	Ref.
1	Friday 3 February	(England) Wigan, Robin Park Tennis Centre	Peter Wright	6 – 4	Adrian Lewis	
2	Saturday 4 February	(England) Wigan, Robin Park Tennis Centre	Simon Whitlock	6 – 4	Gary Anderson	
3	Sunday 5 February	(England) Wigan, Robin Park Tennis Centre	Peter Wright	6 – 5	Michael Smith	
4	Friday 10 February	(England) Wigan, Robin Park Tennis Centre	Michael van Gerwen	6 – 3	Gary Anderson	
5	Saturday 11 February	(England) Wigan, Robin Park Tennis Centre	Simon Whitlock	6 – 3	Ronny Huybrechts	
6	Sunday 12 February	(England) Wigan, Robin Park Tennis Centre	Peter Wright	6 – 3	James Wade	

== Players Championships ==
Compared to the previous year, there were two Players Championship events added to the calendar, increasing the number to 22. In addition, the top 64 of the Players Championship qualified for the Players Championship Finals.

No.	Date	Venue	Winner	Legs	Runner-up	Ref.
1	Saturday 25 February	(England) Barnsley, Barnsley Metrodome	Alan Norris	6 – 1	Peter Jacques	
2	Sunday 26 February	(England) Barnsley, Barnsley Metrodome	Gary Anderson	6 – 1	Peter Wright	
3	Saturday 11 March	(England) Barnsley, Barnsley Metrodome	Rob Cross	6 – 5	Mervyn King	
4	Sunday 12 March	(England) Barnsley, Barnsley Metrodome	Simon Whitlock	6 – 3	Darren Johnson	
5	Saturday 1 April	(England) Milton Keynes, Arena MK	Adrian Lewis	6 – 3	Dave Chisnall	
6	Sunday 2 April	(England) Milton Keynes, Arena MK	Michael van Gerwen	6 – 1	Peter Wright	
7	Saturday 8 April	(England) Barnsley, Barnsley Metrodome	Daryl Gurney	6 – 3	Kim Huybrechts	
8	Sunday 9 April	(England) Barnsley, Barnsley Metrodome	Joe Cullen	6 – 5	Daryl Gurney	
9	Saturday 29 April	(England) Wigan, Robin Park Tennis Centre	Michael van Gerwen	6 – 2	Robert Thornton	
10	Sunday 30 April	(England) Wigan, Robin Park Tennis Centre	Gary Anderson	6 – 3	Peter Wright	
11	Saturday 20 May	(England) Milton Keynes, Arena MK	Peter Wright	6 – 3	Daryl Gurney	
12	Sunday 21 May	(England) Milton Keynes, Arena MK	Rob Cross	6 – 5	Ian White	
13	Saturday 17 June	(England) Wigan, Robin Park Tennis Centre	Steve Beaton	6 – 3	Gary Anderson	
14	Sunday 18 June	(England) Wigan, Robin Park Tennis Centre	Gary Anderson	6 – 1	Ian White	
15	Saturday 8 July	(England) Barnsley, Barnsley Metrodome	Darren Webster	6 – 1	Daryl Gurney	
16	Sunday 9 July	(England) Barnsley, Barnsley Metrodome	Joe Cullen	6 – 4	Zoran Lerchbacher	
17	Saturday 5 August	(England) Barnsley, Barnsley Metrodome	Kyle Anderson	6 – 2	Kevin Painter	
18	Sunday 6 August	(England) Barnsley, Barnsley Metrodome	Dave Chisnall	6 – 5	Richard North	
19	Friday 29 September	(Republic of Ireland) Dublin, Citywest Hotel	Rob Cross	6 – 2	Peter Wright	
20	Saturday 30 September	(Republic of Ireland) Dublin, Citywest Hotel	Mensur Suljović	6 – 4	Stephen Bunting	
21	Tuesday 10 October	(England) Barnsley, Barnsley Metrodome	Rob Cross	6 – 3	Adrian Lewis	
22	Wednesday 11 October	(England) Barnsley, Barnsley Metrodome	Jonny Clayton	6 – 1	James Wilson	

== European Tour ==
Compared to 2016, there were two European Tour events added on the calendar. In addition, the top 32 of the European Tour Order of Merit ranking qualified for the European Championship.

No.	Date	Event	Location	Winner	Legs	Runner-up	Ref.
1	24-26 March	German Darts Championship	(Germany) Hildesheim, Halle 39	Peter Wright (95.36)	6 – 3	Michael van Gerwen (93.29)	
2	15-17 April	German Darts Masters	(Germany) Jena, Sparkassen-Arena	Michael van Gerwen (107.33)	6 – 2	Jelle Klaasen (98.29)	
3	21-23 April	German Darts Open	(Germany) Saarbrücken, Saarlandhalle	Peter Wright (97.49)	6 – 5	Benito van de Pas (110.46)	
4	5-7 May	European Darts Grand Prix	(Germany) Sindelfingen, Glaspalast	Peter Wright (104.86)	6 – 0	Michael van Gerwen (99.56)	
5	12-14 May	Gibraltar Darts Trophy	Gibraltar, Victoria Stadium	Michael Smith (96.33)	6 – 4	Mensur Suljović (99.00)	
6	9-11 June	European Darts Matchplay	(Germany) Hamburg, Edel-optics.de Arena	Michael van Gerwen (102.05)	6 – 3	Mensur Suljović (106.26)	
7	23-25 June	Austrian Darts Open	(Austria) Vienna, Multiversum Schwechat	Michael van Gerwen (105.16)	6 – 5	Michael Smith (101.01)	
8	30 June-2 July	European Darts Open	(Germany) Leverkusen, Ostermann-Arena	Peter Wright (103.07)	6 – 2	Mervyn King (92.42)	
9	1-3 September	Dutch Darts Masters	(Netherlands) Maastricht, MECC Maastricht	Michael van Gerwen (99.59)	6 – 1	Steve Beaton (98.54)	
10	8-10 September	German Darts Grand Prix	(Germany) Mannheim, Maimarkthalle	Michael van Gerwen (111.00)	6 – 3	Rob Cross (93.38)	
11	22-24 September	International Darts Open	(Germany) Riesa, SACHSENarena	Peter Wright (102.65)	6 – 5	Kim Huybrechts (92.44)	
12	13-15 October	European Darts Trophy	(Germany) Göttingen, Lokhalle	Michael van Gerwen (96.70)	6 – 4	Rob Cross (93.23)	

== PDC Challenge Tour ==
The Challenge Tour consisted of 5 weekends of 4 events.

No.	Date	Venue	Winner	Legs	Runner-up	Ref.
1	Saturday 25 March	(England) Milton Keynes, Arena MK	Aaron Dyer	5 – 1	Mark Frost	
2	Saturday 25 March	(England) Milton Keynes, Arena MK	Paul Milford	5 – 0	Martin Lukeman	
3	Sunday 26 March	(England) Milton Keynes, Arena MK	Lee Evans	5 – 4	Kevin Dowling	
4	Sunday 26 March	(England) Milton Keynes, Arena MK	Aaron Dyer	5 – 2	Mark Wilson	
5	Saturday 15 April	(England) Barnsley, Barnsley Metrodome	Ryan Harrington	5 – 2	Mark Frost	
6	Saturday 15 April	(England) Barnsley, Barnsley Metrodome	Wayne Jones	5 – 1	Jason Wilson	
7	Sunday 16 April	(England) Barnsley, Barnsley Metrodome	Mark Dudbridge	5 – 2	Alan Tabern	
8	Sunday 16 April	(England) Barnsley, Barnsley Metrodome	Wayne Jones	5 – 2	Jay Foreman	
9	Saturday 13 May	(England) Milton Keynes, Arena MK	Nathan Aspinall	5 – 1	Radek Szagański	
10	Saturday 13 May	(England) Milton Keynes, Arena MK	Robert Rickwood	5 – 3	Jason Wilson	
11	Sunday 14 May	(England) Milton Keynes, Arena MK	Peter Jacques	5 – 4	Wayne Jones	
12	Sunday 14 May	(England) Milton Keynes, Arena MK	Luke Humphries	5 – 4	Andy Smith	
13	Saturday 10 June	(England) Milton Keynes, Arena MK	Warrick Scheffer	5 – 3	Mark Dudbridge	
14	Saturday 10 June	(England) Milton Keynes, Arena MK	Kevin McDine	5 – 4	Luke Humphries	
15	Sunday 11 June	(England) Milton Keynes, Arena MK	Mark Dudbridge	5 – 4	Kevin Edwards	
16	Sunday 11 June	(England) Milton Keynes, Arena MK	Matthew Edgar	5 – 2	Barrie Bates	
17	Saturday 9 September	(England) Wigan, Robin Park Tennis Centre	Peter Jacques	5 – 2	Wayne Jones	
18	Saturday 9 September	(England) Wigan, Robin Park Tennis Centre	Nick Fullwell	5 – 4	Kevin Edwards	
19	Sunday 10 September	(England) Wigan, Robin Park Tennis Centre	Wayne Jones	5 – 3	Stuart Kellett	
20	Sunday 10 September	(England) Wigan, Robin Park Tennis Centre	Alan Tabern	5 – 3	Adam Smith-Neale	

== PDC Development Tour ==
The Development Tour consisted of 5 weekends of 4 events.

No.	Date	Venue	Winner	Legs	Runner-up	Ref.
1	Saturday 18 February	(England) Wigan, Robin Park Tennis Centre	Luke Humphries	5 – 1	Dawson Murschell	
2	Saturday 18 February	(England) Wigan, Robin Park Tennis Centre	Dimitri Van den Bergh	5 – 2	Kenny Neyens	
3	Sunday 19 February	(England) Wigan, Robin Park Tennis Centre	Ryan Meikle	5 – 1	Harry Ward	
4	Sunday 19 February	(England) Wigan, Robin Park Tennis Centre	Luke Humphries	5 – 2	Kenny Neyens	
5	Saturday 18 March	(England) Wigan, Robin Park Tennis Centre	Kenny Neyens	5 – 4	Adam Hunt	
6	Saturday 18 March	(England) Wigan, Robin Park Tennis Centre	Dimitri Van den Bergh	5 – 2	Adam Hunt	
7	Sunday 19 March	(England) Wigan, Robin Park Tennis Centre	Adam Hunt	5 – 3	Stephen Rosney	
8	Sunday 19 March	(England) Wigan, Robin Park Tennis Centre	Steve Lennon	5 – 3	Ted Evetts	
9	Saturday 27 May	(Germany) Hildesheim, Halle 39	Luke Humphries	5 – 1	Dimitri Van den Bergh	
10	Saturday 27 May	(Germany) Hildesheim, Halle 39	Mike van Duivenbode	5 – 0	Adam Hunt	
11	Sunday 28 May	(Germany) Hildesheim, Halle 39	Jeffrey de Zwaan	5 – 2	Adam Smith-Neale	
12	Sunday 28 May	(Germany) Hildesheim, Halle 39	Rusty-Jake Rodriguez	5 – 1	Harry Ward	
13	Saturday 16 September	(England) Barnsley, Barnsley Metrodome	Dimitri Van den Bergh	5 – 4	Rhys Griffin	
14	Saturday 16 September	(England) Barnsley, Barnsley Metrodome	Mike van Duivenbode	5 – 3	Dimitri Van den Bergh	
15	Sunday 17 September	(England) Barnsley, Barnsley Metrodome	Martin Schindler	5 – 2	Justin van Tergouw	
16	Sunday 17 September	(England) Barnsley, Barnsley Metrodome	Luke Humphries	5 – 1	Ryan Meikle	
17	Saturday 4 November	(England) Wigan, Robin Park Tennis Centre	Mike De Decker	5 – 3	Kurt Parry	
18	Saturday 4 November	(England) Wigan, Robin Park Tennis Centre	Ted Evetts	5 – 2	Rowby-John Rodriguez	
19	Sunday 5 November	(England) Wigan, Robin Park Tennis Centre	Rowby-John Rodriguez	5 – 4	Luke Humphries	
20	Sunday 5 November	(England) Wigan, Robin Park Tennis Centre	Luke Humphries	5 – 3	Jake Jones	

== Professional Darts Corporation Nordic & Baltic ==
The Scandinavian Darts Corporation was renamed as the Professional Darts Corporation Nordic & Baltic (PDCNB). There were 10 events held over 5 weekends.

No.	Date	Venue	Winner	Legs	Runner-up	Ref.
1	Saturday 18 February	(Denmark) Copenhagen, Hotel Park Inn by Radisson	Kim Viljanen	6 – 2	Magnus Caris	
2	Sunday 19 February	(Denmark) Copenhagen, Hotel Park Inn by Radisson	Kim Viljanen	6 – 0	Marko Kantele	
3	Saturday 18 March	(Sweden) Gothenburg, Apple Hotel	Kim Viljanen	6 – 1	Daniel Larsson	
4	Sunday 19 March	(Sweden) Gothenburg, Apple Hotel	Kim Viljanen	6 – 3	Ricky Nauman	
5	Saturday 20 May	(Norway) Oslo, Comfort Hotel Runway Gardermoen	Dennis Nilsson	6 – 3	Per Laursen	
6	Sunday 21 May	(Norway) Oslo, Comfort Hotel Runway Gardermoen	Marko Kantele	6 – 5	Per Laursen	
7	Saturday 12 August	(Finland) Helsinki, Original Sokos Hotel Vantaa	Kim Viljanen	6 – 0	Magnus Caris	
8	Sunday 13 August	(Finland) Helsinki, Original Sokos Hotel Vantaa	Marko Kantele	6 – 4	Cor Dekker	
9	Saturday 4 November	(Latvia) Riga, Bellevue Park Hotel	Kim Viljanen	6 – 2	Marko Kantele	
10	Sunday 5 November	(Latvia) Riga, Bellevue Park Hotel	Kim Viljanen	6 – 2	Ulf Ceder	

== Dartplayers Australia Grand Prix Pro Tour ==
The Dartplayers Australia Grand Prix rankings are calculated from events across Australia. Gordon Mathers was the top player in the rankings, and therefore has automatically qualified for the 2018 World Championship.

No.	Date	Also known as	Winner	Legs	Runner-up	Ref.
1	Friday 3 February	DPA World Series Qualifier 1	John Weber	6 – 5	Lucas Cameron	
2	Saturday 4 February	Australian Pro Tour Event 1	Cody Harris	6 – 4	Corey Cadby	
3	Sunday 5 February	Australian Pro Tour Event 2	Corey Cadby	6 – 1	John Weber	
4	Friday 17 February	DPA World Series Qualifier 2	Justin Thompson	6 – 4	Corey Cadby	
5	Saturday 18 February	Australian Pro Tour Event 3	Lucas Cameron	6 – 2	Corey Cadby	
6	Sunday 19 February	Australian Pro Tour Event 4	Rhys Mathewson	6 – 5	Lucas Cameron	
7	Friday 10 March	DPA World Series Qualifier 3	Corey Cadby	6 – 3	Rhys Mathewson	
8	Saturday 11 March	Australian Pro Tour Event 5	Justin Thompson	6 – 4	John Weber	
9	Sunday 12 March	Australian Pro Tour Event 6	Rhys Mathewson	6 – 4	Corey Cadby	
10	Friday 24 March	DPA World Series Qualifier 4	Cody Harris	6 – 5	Lucas Cameron	
11	Saturday 25 March	Australian Pro Tour Event 7	Cody Harris	6 – 2	Rhys Mathewson	
12	Sunday 26 March	Australian Pro Tour Event 8	Corey Cadby	6 – 3	Gordon Mathers	
13	Friday 7 April	DPA World Series Qualifier 5	Koha Kokiri	6 – 2	Tic Bridge	
14	Saturday 8 April	Australian Pro Tour Event 9	Gordon Mathers	6 – 1	Corey Cadby	
15	Sunday 9 April	Australian Pro Tour Event 10	Gordon Mathers	6 – 3	Koha Kokiri	
16	Friday 28 April	DPA World Series Qualifier 6	Cody Harris	6 – ?	Dave Marland	
17	Saturday 29 April	Australian Pro Tour Event 11	Cody Harris	6 – 2	Gordon Mathers	
18	Sunday 30 April	Australian Pro Tour Event 12	Justin Thompson	6 – 5	Rhys Mathewson	
19	Friday 12 May	DPA World Series Qualifier 7	Corey Cadby	6 – ?	Rhys Mathewson	
20	Saturday 13 May	Australian Pro Tour Event 13	Tic Bridge	6 – 4	Gordon Mathers	
21	Sunday 14 May	Australian Pro Tour Event 14	Gordon Mathers	6 – 4	Corey Cadby	
22	Friday 16 June	DPA World Series Qualifier 8	David Platt	6 – 3	Corey Cadby	
23	Saturday 17 June	Australian Pro Tour Event 15	Corey Cadby	6 – 0	Barry Gardner	
24	Sunday 18 June	Australian Pro Tour Event 16	Koha Kokiri	6 – 2	Rhys Mathewson	
25	Sunday 26 November	Harrows Oceanic Classic	Tony David	6 – 4	Brad Thorp	

== EuroAsian Darts Corporation (EADC) Pro Tour ==
The 6 EADC Pro Tour events and the 2018 World Championship Qualifier were played at Omega Plaza Business Center, Moscow. Players from Armenia, Azerbaijan, Belarus, Georgia, Kazakhstan, Kyrgyzstan, Moldova, Russia, Tajikistan, Turkmenistan, Uzbekistan and Ukraine are eligible to play.

No.	Date	Venue	Winner	Legs	Runner-up	Ref.
1	Saturday 25 February	(Russia) Moscow, Omega Plaza Business Center	Boris Koltsov	6 – 2	Evgenii Izotov	
2	Sunday 26 February	(Russia) Moscow, Omega Plaza Business Center	Aleksandr Oreshkin	6 – 3	Boris Koltsov	
3	Saturday 25 March	(Russia) Moscow, Omega Plaza Business Center	Aleksander Shevel	6 – 3	Maxim Belov	
4	Sunday 26 March	(Russia) Moscow, Omega Plaza Business Center	Roman Obukhov	6 – 3	Aleksandr Oreshkin	
5	Saturday 29 April	(Russia) Moscow, Omega Plaza Business Center	Evgenii Izotov	6 – 5	Aleksandr Oreshkin	
6	Sunday 30 April	(Russia) Moscow, Omega Plaza Business Center	Boris Koltsov	6 – 0	Aleksandr Oreshkin	

== World Championship International Qualifiers ==
Date	Event	Winner	Score	Runner-up	Ref.
Sunday 9 July	DPNZ Qualifier	Cody Harris	7 – 2	Warren Parry	
Thursday 13 July	North American Championship	Willard Bruguier	6 – 5	Dave Richardson	
Sunday 10 September	PDJ Japanese Qualifier	Seigo Asada	5 – 2	Yuya Higuchi	
Saturday 23 September	Central/South American Qualifier	Diogo Portela	6 – 1	Alexandre Sattin	
Saturday 30 September	Eastern Europe Qualifier	Alan Ljubić	6 – 2	Krzysztof Kciuk	
Saturday 7 October	Tom Kirby Memorial Irish Matchplay	William O'Connor	6 – 4	Jason Cullen	
Sunday 8 October	South & West Asia Qualifier	Paul Lim	2 – 1	Keshminder Jaswant	
Saturday 21 October	Southern Europe Qualifier	Toni Alcinas	6 – 5	Jesús Noguera	
Sunday 22 October	Russian Qualifier	Aleksandr Oreshkin	3 – 1	Boris Koltsov	
Saturday 28 October	North & East Asia Qualifier	Kai Fan Leung	2 – 0	Minseok Choi	
Sunday 29 October	Harrows Oceanic Masters	Bernie Smith	6 – 5	Tahuna Irwin	
Sunday 5 November	China Qualifier	Xiaochen Zong	2 – 1	Yin Deng	
Saturday 18 November	German Qualifier	Kevin Münch	10 – 3	Dragutin Horvat	
Sunday 19 November	Central Europe Qualifier	Kenny Neyens	6 – 4	Davyd Venken	
Sunday 26 November	World Youth Championship	Dimitri Van den Bergh	6 – 3	Josh Payne	

== World Championship PDPA Qualifier ==
The winner qualified directly for the first round of the 2018 PDC World Darts Championship. The runner-up qualified for the preliminary round, as did the winner of the third-place playoff.

Date	Venue	Winner	Score	Runner-up	Third place	Score	Fourth place	Ref.
Monday 27 November	(England) Milton Keynes, Arena MK	Ted Evetts	5 – 1	Brendan Dolan	Jamie Lewis	5 – 3	Chris Quantock	
