= 2017 European Darts Matchplay =

Tournament information
- Dates: 9–11 June 2017
- Venue: Edel-optics.de Arena
- Location: Hamburg, Germany
- Organisation(s): Professional Darts Corporation (PDC)
- Format: Legs; First to 6 legs
- Prize fund: £135,000
- Winner's share: £25,000
- High checkout: 170 Max Hopp

Champion(s)
- Michael van Gerwen (NED)

The 2017 European Darts Matchplay was the sixth of twelve PDC European Tour events on the 2017 PDC Pro Tour. The tournament took place at the Edel-optics.de Arena, Hamburg, Germany, from 9 to 11 June 2017. It featured a field of 48 players and £135,000 in prize money, with £25,000 going to the winner.

James Wade was the defending champion after defeating Dave Chisnall 6–5 in the final of the 2016 tournament, but lost to Kyle Anderson in the second round.

Michael van Gerwen won his 16th European Tour Title after defeating Mensur Suljović 6–3 in the final.

== Prize money ==
This is how the prize money is divided:

Stage (num. of players)		Prize money
Winner	(1)	£25,000
Runner-up	(1)	£10,000
Semi-finalists	(2)	£6,000
Quarter-finalists	(4)	£4,000
Third round losers	(8)	£3,000
Second round losers	(16)	£2,000
First round losers	(16)	£1,000
Total	£135,000	

== Qualification and format ==
The top 16 players from the PDC ProTour Order of Merit on 11 May automatically qualified for the event and were seeded in the second round.

The remaining 32 places went to players from five qualifying events - 18 from the UK Qualifier (held in Milton Keynes on 19 May), eight from the West/South European Qualifier (held on 31 May), four from the Host Nation Qualifier (held on 8 June), one from the Nordic & Baltic Qualifier (held on 18 March) and one from the East European Qualifier (held on 30 April).

The following players took part in the tournament:

Top 16
1. (Netherlands) Michael van Gerwen (champion)
2. (Scotland) Peter Wright (third round)
3. (Austria) Mensur Suljović (runner-up)
4. (Australia) Simon Whitlock (second round)
5. (Netherlands) Benito van de Pas (second round)
6. (England) Dave Chisnall (quarter-finals)
7. (Netherlands) Jelle Klaasen (second round)
8. (Belgium) Kim Huybrechts (second round)
9. (England) Alan Norris (third round)
10. (England) James Wade (second round)
11. (England) Ian White (third round)
12. (England) Joe Cullen (quarter-finals)
13. (England) Michael Smith (semi-finals)
14. (Northern Ireland) Daryl Gurney (third round)
15. (Spain) Cristo Reyes (semi-finals)
16. (England) Mervyn King (third round)

UK Qualifier
- (England) Stephen Bunting (quarter-finals)
- (England) Lee Bryant (first round)
- (England) Adrian Lewis (first round)
- (England) Peter Hudson (quarter-finals)
- (Australia) Kyle Anderson (third round)
- (England) Andy Hamilton (third round)
- (England) James Wilson (second round)
- (England) Richard North (second round)
- (England) Chris Dobey (first round)
- (England) Darren Webster (first round)
- (England) Andy Jenkins (first round)
- (England) Justin Pipe (second round)
- (England) Nathan Aspinall (second round)
- (Northern Ireland) Mickey Mansell (first round)
- (Scotland) John Henderson (second round)
- (England) Peter Jacques (second round)
- (Northern Ireland) Brendan Dolan (first round)
- (England) Chris Quantock (first round)

West/South European Qualifier
- (Greece) John Michael (second round)
- (Belgium) Kenny Neyens (first round)
- (Belgium) Mike De Decker (second round)
- (Netherlands) Jimmy Hendriks (second round)
- (Netherlands) Vincent van der Voort (third round)
- (Netherlands) Christian Kist (first round)
- (Spain) Antonio Alcinas (first round)
- (Netherlands) Dirk van Duijvenbode (second round)

Host Nation Qualifier
- (Germany) Erik Tautfest (first round)
- (Germany) Martin Schindler (first round)
- (Germany) Max Hopp (first round)
- (Germany) Mike Holz (first round)

Nordic & Baltic Qualifier
- (Finland) Marko Kantele (second round)

East European Qualifier
- (Poland) Krzysztof Ratajski (first round)

== Draw ==
First round (best of 11 legs); 9 June
(Scotland) John Henderson 93.84	6
(Germany) Mike Holz 79.68	4
(England) Richard North 88.03	6
(Northern Ireland) Mickey Mansell 83.04	1
(Northern Ireland) Brendan Dolan 88.87	1
(England) Peter Hudson 96.26	6
(Spain) Antonio Alcinas 82.10	5
(Finland) Marko Kantele 81.23	6
(England) Adrian Lewis 97.00	4
(Netherlands) Vincent van der Voort 95.36	6
(England) Justin Pipe 98.52	6
(Poland) Krzysztof Ratajski 96.81	4
(England) Andy Hamilton 84.49	6
(Germany) Martin Schindler 83.01	5
(Germany) Max Hopp 83.36	2
(Belgium) Mike De Decker 92.60	6
(Greece) John Michael 83.06	6
(Germany) Erik Tautfest 80.35	5
(England) Chris Quantock 86.66	3
(England) Nathan Aspinall 88.41	6
(England) Stephen Bunting 87.23	6
(Belgium) Kenny Neyens 83.85	3
(Australia) Kyle Anderson 91.75	6
(Netherlands) Christian Kist 87.52	5
(England) James Wilson 90.02	6
(England) Lee Bryant 87.45	4
(England) Chris Dobey 82.06	5
(England) Peter Jacques 83.94	6
(England) Darren Webster 87.76	3
(Netherlands) Dirk van Duijvenbode 87.40	6
(England) Andy Jenkins 91.44	4
(Netherlands) Jimmy Hendriks 91.97	6

Second round (best of 11 legs); 10 June
1	(Netherlands) Michael van Gerwen 107.68	6
(Scotland) John Henderson 93.53	2
16	(England) Mervyn King 95.35	6
(England) Richard North 83.73	2
8	(Belgium) Kim Huybrechts 90.19	5
(England) Peter Hudson 90.60	6
9	(England) Alan Norris 81.62	6
(Finland) Marko Kantele 79.75	3
5	(Netherlands) Benito van de Pas 97.44	5
(Netherlands) Vincent van der Voort 98.11	6
12	(England) Joe Cullen 96.69	6
(England) Justin Pipe 90.59	2
4	(Australia) Simon Whitlock 92.97	1
(England) Andy Hamilton 90.13	6
13	(England) Michael Smith 99.84	6
(Belgium) Mike De Decker 92.67	1
2	(Scotland) Peter Wright 101.33	6
(Greece) John Michael 91.34	0
15	(Spain) Cristo Reyes 93.86	6
(England) Nathan Aspinall 96.33	5
7	(Netherlands) Jelle Klaasen 84.86	2
(England) Stephen Bunting 95.29	6
10	(England) James Wade 71.73	2
(Australia) Kyle Anderson 87.35	6
6	(England) Dave Chisnall 104.83	6
(England) James Wilson 93.19	4
11	(England) Ian White 89.11	6
(England) Peter Jacques 84.63	3
3	(Austria) Mensur Suljović 90.79	6
(Netherlands) Dirk van Duijvenbode 94.28	5
14	(Northern Ireland) Daryl Gurney 88.55	6
(Netherlands) Jimmy Hendriks 82.31	1

Third round (best of 11 legs); 11 June
1	(Netherlands) van Gerwen 102.76	6
16	(England) King 92.36	3
(England) Hudson 80.64	6
9	(England) Norris 80.59	3
(Netherlands) van der Voort 103.18	4
12	(England) Cullen 97.89	6
(England) Hamilton 88.89	2
13	(England) Smith 100.56	6
2	(Scotland) Wright 102.02	5
15	(Spain) Reyes 103.24	6
(England) Bunting 103.05	6
(Australia) Anderson 94.52	3
6	(England) Chisnall 94.02	6
11	(England) White 97.26	5
3	(Austria) Suljović 91.71	6
14	(Northern Ireland) Gurney 90.72	5

Quarter-finals (best of 11 legs); 11 June
1	(Netherlands) van Gerwen 106.10	6
(England) Hudson 91.48	4
12	(England) Cullen 90.20	2
13	(England) Smith 91.06	6
15	(Spain) Reyes 100.83	6
(England) Bunting 89.21	3
6	(England) Chisnall 92.64	3
3	(Austria) Suljović 96.57	6

Semi-finals (best of 11 legs); 11 June
1	(Netherlands) van Gerwen 99.73	6
13	(England) Smith 97.99	3
15	(Spain) Reyes 90.05	3
3	(Austria) Suljović 99.25	6

Final (best of 11 legs); 11 June
1	(Netherlands) van Gerwen 102.05	6
3	(Austria) Suljović 106.26	3
