= 2018 PDC World Darts Championship =

2017/18 William Hill World Darts Championship
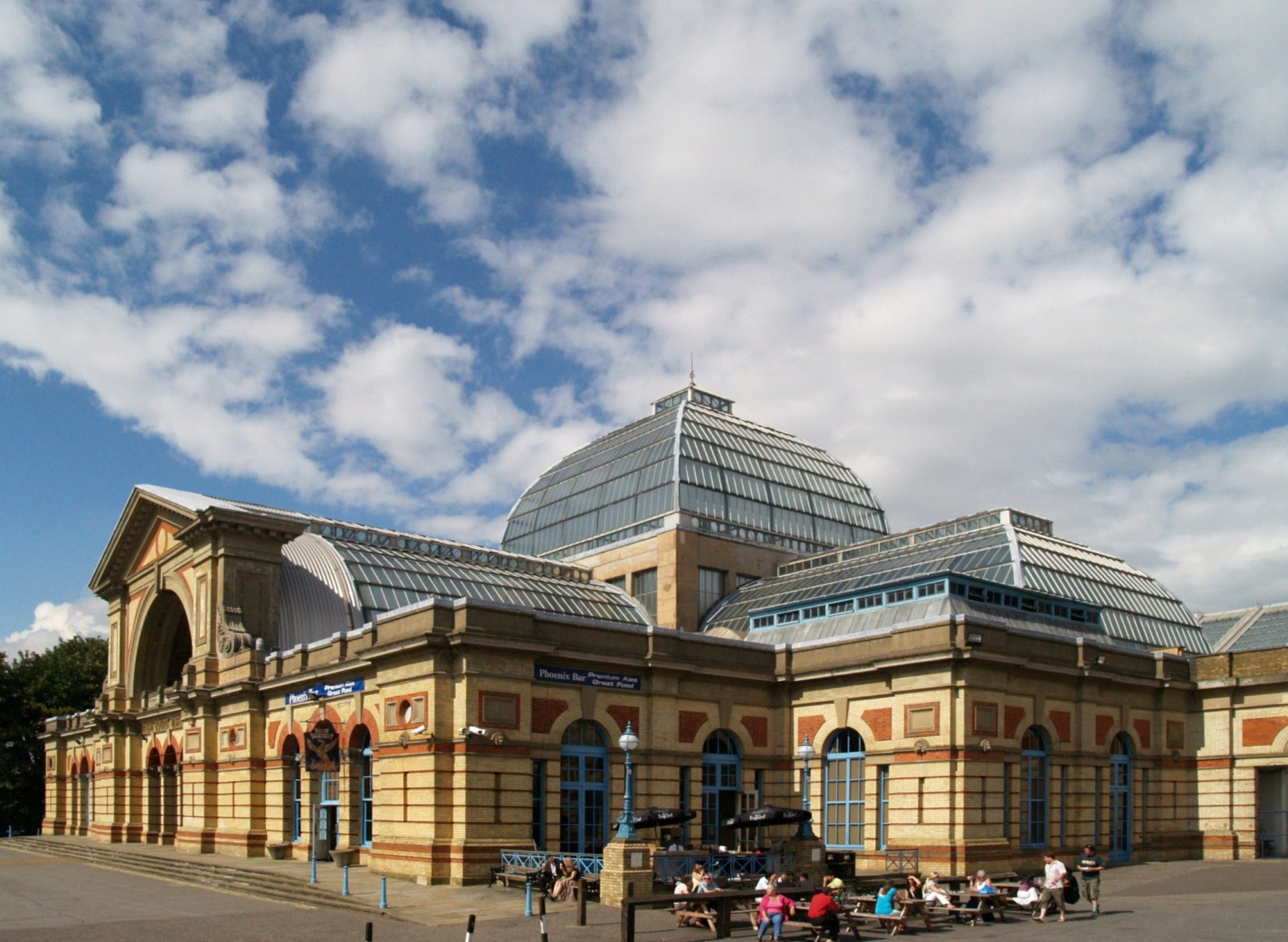

Tournament information
- Dates: 14 December 2017 – 1 January 2018
- Venue: Alexandra Palace
- Location: London, England
- Organisation(s): Professional Darts Corporation (PDC)
- Format: Sets; Final – best of 13
- Prize fund: £1,800,000
- Winner's share: £400,000
- High checkout: 170; Michael van Gerwen; Stephen Bunting; Daryl Gurney; Jeff Smith; Jamie Lewis; Steve West

Champion(s)
- Rob Cross (ENG)

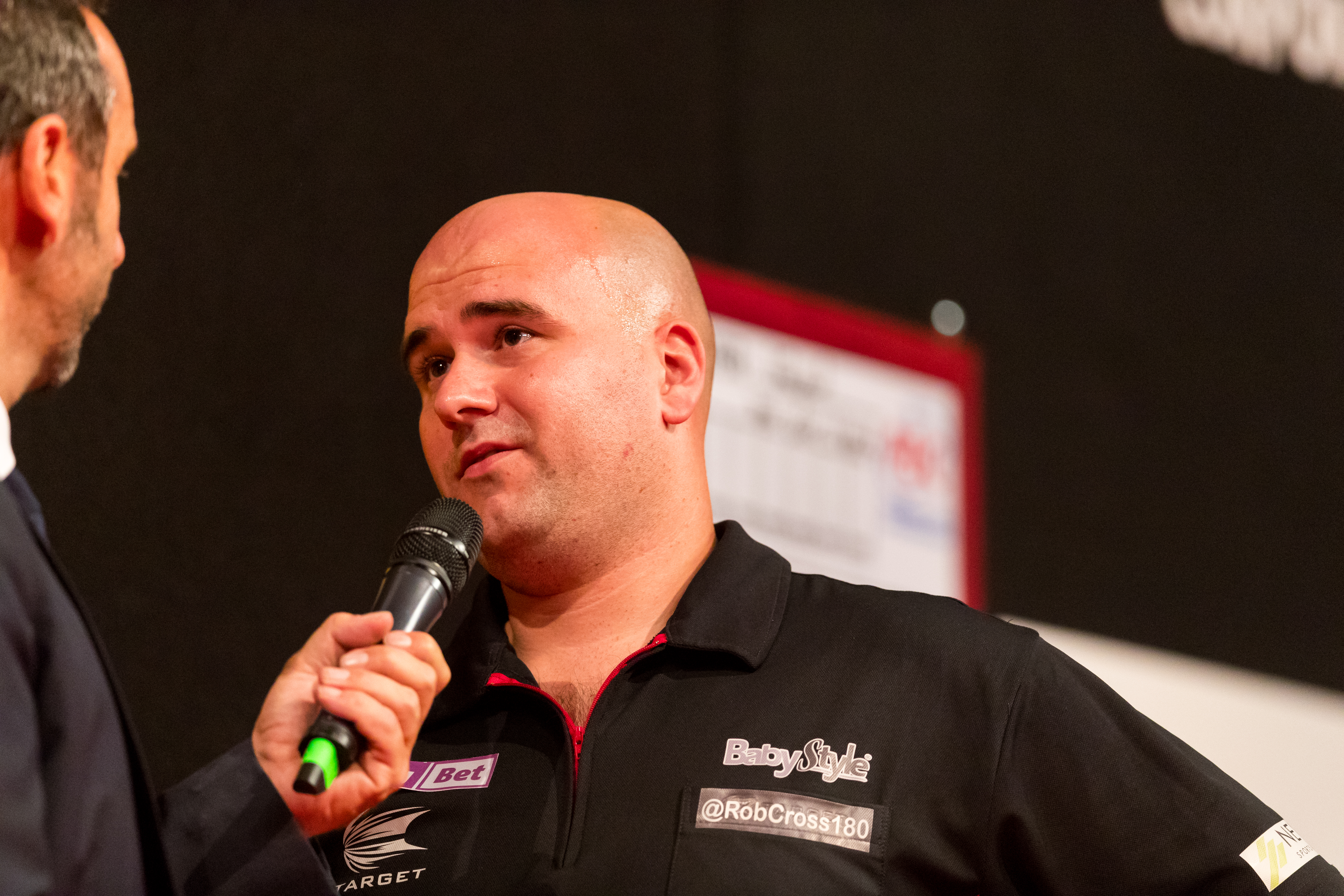
Rob Cross won his first World title on his debut

The 2018 PDC World Darts Championship (known for sponsorship reasons as the 2017/18 William Hill World Darts Championship) was a darts event, held from 14 December 2017 to 1 January 2018 at the Alexandra Palace in London, United Kingdom. It was the twenty-fifth World Championship organised by the Professional Darts Corporation since it separated from the British Darts Organisation.

Michael van Gerwen was the defending champion, but lost 6–5 in sets to Rob Cross in the semi-finals, with the score at 5–5 in sets and with van Gerwen leading 5–4 in legs he missed 5 match darts to beat Cross. Cross forced an 11th and sudden death leg, van Gerwen missed a 6th match dart before Cross hit double 8 to win an epic semi-final and reach his first world final. Cross went on to win the World Championship on his debut by defeating Phil Taylor 7–2 in the final. Cross only turned professional 11 months prior to the event. This was Taylor's 29th and final World Championship, surpassing the record of 28 appearances he jointly held with John Lowe.

Jamie Lewis became the first player to reach the semi-finals after entering the championship through a preliminary round event, first introduced at the 2004 Championship. Lewis eventually fell to Taylor in the semi-final, by a score of 6–1.

== Prize money ==
The prize money for the tournament was a record high of £1,800,000 in total. The winner's prize money increased from £350,000 to £400,000.

Position (num. of players)		Prize money (Total: £1,800,000)
Winner	(1)	£400,000
Runner-up	(1)	£170,000
Semi-finalists	(2)	£85,000
Quarter-finalists	(4)	£40,000
Third round losers	(8)	£27,000
Second round losers	(16)	£18,500
First round losers	(32)	£11,000
Preliminary round losers	(8)	£4,500
Nine-dart finish	(0)	£20,000

== Qualification ==
=== Qualifiers ===
Order of Merit

1. (Netherlands) Michael van Gerwen
2. (Scotland) Peter Wright
3. (Scotland) Gary Anderson
4. (Northern Ireland) Daryl Gurney
5. (Austria) Mensur Suljović
6. (England) Phil Taylor
7. (England) Adrian Lewis
8. (England) Dave Chisnall
9. Raymond van Barneveld
10. (Australia) Simon Whitlock
11. (England) James Wade
12. (Netherlands) Jelle Klaasen
13. (England) Michael Smith
14. (Netherlands) Benito van de Pas
15. (England) Alan Norris
16. (Wales) Gerwyn Price
17. (England) Ian White
18. (Belgium) Kim Huybrechts
19. (England) Joe Cullen
20. Rob Cross
21. (England) Stephen Bunting
22. (England) Mervyn King
23. (England) Darren Webster
24. (Australia) Kyle Anderson
25. (England) Steve Beaton
26. (Spain) Cristo Reyes
27. (England) Justin Pipe
28. (Scotland) Robert Thornton
29. (Scotland) John Henderson
30. (Wales) Mark Webster
31. (Wales) Jonny Clayton
32. (England) James Wilson

Pro Tour

1. (England) Richard North
2. (Netherlands) Vincent van der Voort
3. (Netherlands) Christian Kist
4. (Belgium) Ronny Huybrechts
5. (Netherlands) Jermaine Wattimena
6. (England) Steve West
7. (Austria) Zoran Lerchbacher
8. Dimitri Van den Bergh
9. (Netherlands) Jan Dekker
10. (England) Keegan Brown
11. (England) James Richardson
12. (England) Peter Jacques
13. (Germany) Martin Schindler
14. (England) Chris Dobey
15. (Republic of Ireland) Steve Lennon
16. (England) Kevin Painter

PDPA Qualifier First round qualifier

- (England) Ted Evetts

Preliminary round qualifiers

- (Northern Ireland) Brendan Dolan
- (Wales) Jamie Lewis
International qualifiers (Note: Per the PDC Order of Merit Rules, invited players shall be placed in to either the Preliminary or first round draws for the event based on their position in the Order of Merit (if applicable). If insufficient players hold a position of the Order of Merit, the PDC will select which players are placed in to which round at the discretion of its board of Directors.) (Alphabetical order)

First round qualifiers

- (Spain) Toni Alcinas
- (Finland) Marko Kantele
- (Republic of Ireland) William O'Connor
- (South Africa) Devon Petersen
- (Brazil) Diogo Portela
- (Poland) Krzysztof Ratajski
- (Finland) Kim Viljanen

Preliminary round qualifiers

- (Japan) Seigo Asada
- (United States) Willard Bruguier
- (New Zealand) Cody Harris
- (England) Luke Humphries
- (Hong Kong) Kai Fan Leung
- (Singapore) Paul Lim
- (Croatia) Alan Ljubić
- (Australia) Gordon Mathers
- (Germany) Kevin Münch
- (Belgium) Kenny Neyens
- (Russia) Aleksandr Oreshkin
- (New Zealand) Bernie Smith
- (Canada) Jeff Smith
- (China) Xiaochen Zong

=== Background ===
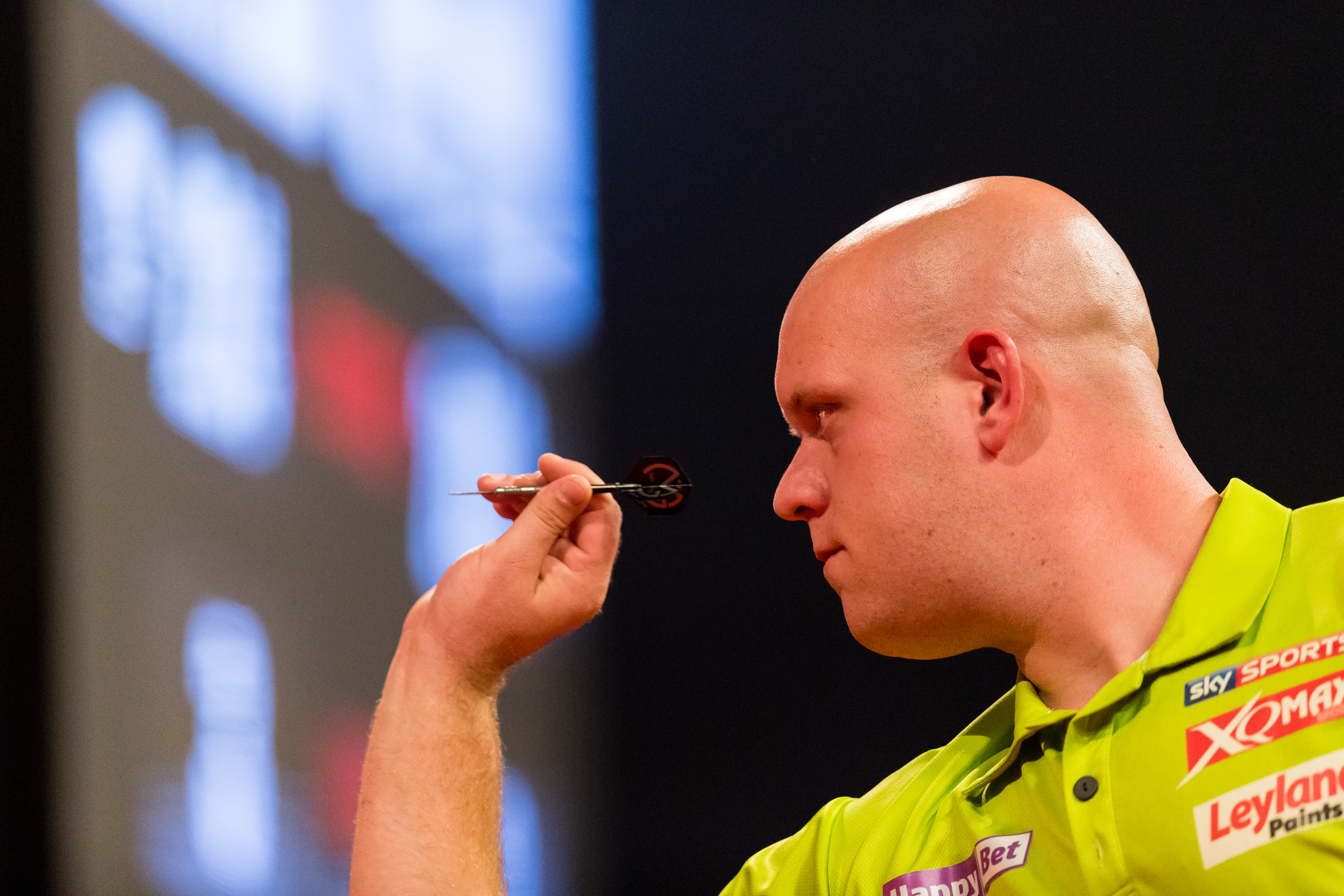
Michael van Gerwen, the number one seed, was the reigning and defending champion, prior to the tournament.

72 players competed in the championship; with the 32 highest ranked players on the PDC Order of Merit being seeded, and the next sixteen highest ranked players from the 2017 PDC Pro Tour Order of Merit and the top eight ranked players from a number of international and invitational qualifiers also going straight into the first round. The remaining sixteen international and invitational qualifiers competed in a preliminary round.

Michael van Gerwen, the winner of the 2014 and 2017 championships, was top of the two-year PDC Order of Merit and number one seed going into the tournament. The tournament was to be the last for Phil Taylor, who had won the PDC World Championship fourteen times previously, most recently in 2013. As well as van Gerwen and Taylor, three other previous PDC world champions qualified as seeds, two-time champions Gary Anderson and Adrian Lewis, and 2007 champion Raymond van Barneveld.

The top seeds below van Gerwen were 2017 UK Open winner Peter Wright, Gary Anderson, 2017 World Grand Prix winner Daryl Gurney and 2017 Champions League of Darts winner Mensur Suljović. Rob Cross, the runner-up at the 2017 European Championship, made his World Championship debut as the 20th seed.

Richard North, in his debut year, was the highest ranked non-seed on the 2017 PDC Pro Tour Order of Merit. As well as North, three other qualifiers through the Pro Tour made their debut, Peter Jacques, Steve Lennon and Martin Schindler. The list of qualifiers also included the 2017 Youth Champion Dimitri Van den Bergh and the 2004 runner-up Kevin Painter.

Amongst the international and invitational qualification tournaments there was, for the first time, a South and Central American Qualifier. The majority of tournaments were the same as had been for the previous championship, but there was no longer a Philippines Championship. Gordon Mathers was the first player to qualify for the Championships, having finished top of the Dartplayers Australia rankings. The top two players on the Nordic & Baltic rankings also qualified, as did the winners of the fifteen international qualifiers, including the 2017 PDC World Youth Championship.

The final four qualification places were announced on 19 October, with places being given to the highest ranked Eastern European, Krzysztof Ratajski, the National Darts Federation of Canada number one Jeff Smith, the highest ranked African, Devon Petersen, and the then-undetermined 2017 Development Tour winner, Luke Humphries. The sudden announcement of these places, and the granting of them to Ratajski, who had declined an invitation to the rival 2018 BDO World Darts Championship before failing to qualify through the 2017 PDC Pro Tour Order of Merit; and Jeff Smith, who had failed to qualify for the BDO World Darts Championship and not played a single PDC event in the previous year, were criticized by some, with ITV4 pundit and tour card holder Paul Nicholson saying he had written to the Professional Darts Players Association to seek clarification over the placings.

The final three placings were determined by the PDPA qualifier held at Arena MK on 27 November, with Ted Evetts securing a first round place by winning the tournament, and runner-up Brendan Dolan and third-place playoff winner Jamie Lewis both qualifying to the preliminary round. The third place had become available as the 2017 PDC World Youth Championship, which carries a qualification place, was won by Dimitri Van den Bergh, who qualified through the Pro Tour Order of Merit.

15 of the international and invitational qualifiers were making their PDC World Championship debuts, Seigo Asada, Willard Bruguier, Ted Evetts, Cody Harris, Luke Humphries, Kai Fan Leung, Alan Ljubić, Gordon Mathers, Kenny Neyens, William O'Connor, Diogo Portela, Krzysztof Ratajski, Bernie Smith, Jeff Smith, and Zong Xiao Chen. Portela was the first ever Brazilian to qualify for the World Championships.

== Summary ==
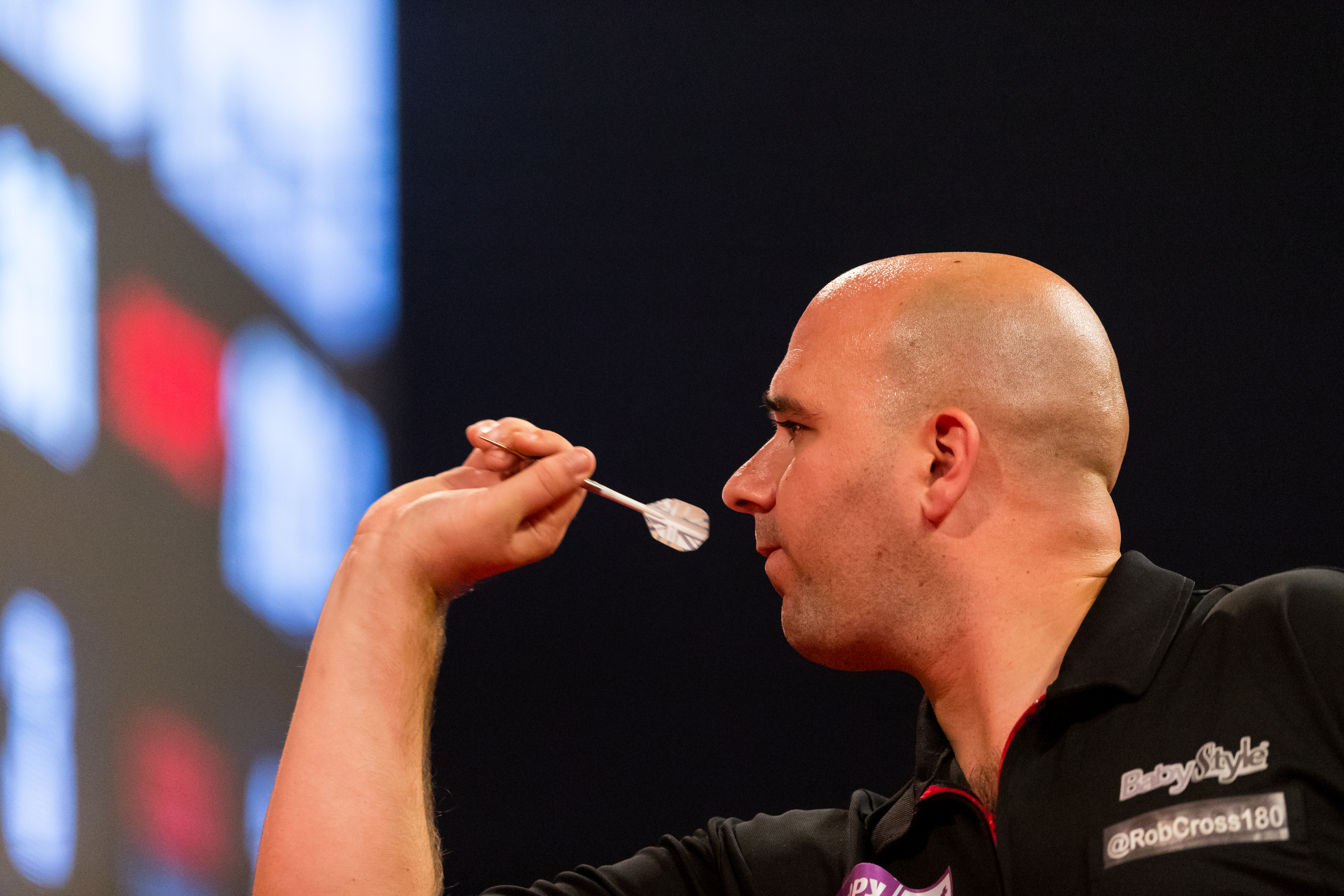
Rob Cross won the championship in his debut year.

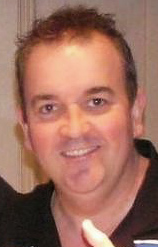
Phil Taylor (pictured in 2009), sixteen-time world darts champion (14 time PDC champion) in his final year before retirement, lost in the final.

The top quarter of the draw saw reigning champion Michael van Gerwen dominate, knocking fellow Dutchman Christian Kist out in the first round, before defeating James Wilson, without losing any of the twelve legs played, and Gerwyn Price, to set up a quarter-final with fellow Dutch former world champion Raymond van Barneveld. In the quarter-final, van Gerwen took an early lead, but missed a dart in the fifth set to take a 4–1 lead and ended up being pulled back to 3–3. The two took one more set each before van Gerwen won the deciding set 3–1 to qualify for the semi-final.

In the second quarter, the fourth seed, Daryl Gurney, was eliminated in the second round by John Henderson. Debutant Rob Cross defeated Michael Smith in the second round after Smith missed two match darts, and Cross went on to defeat Henderson to set up a quarter-final against the World Youth Champion Dimitri Van den Bergh, who had defeated fifth seed Mensur Suljović in the third round. In the quarter-final, Cross led his Belgian opponent early on, leading 4–1 in the best-of-nine match after five sets. Van den Bergh took the next three sets in succession, setting up a decider which Cross won 3–1, hitting double one in the final leg to qualify for the semi-final.

The two highest-ranked seeds in the third quarter fell early on. Two-time champion and seventh seed Adrian Lewis was knocked out in the first round by German qualifier Kevin Münch, while the second seed Peter Wright was knocked out in the second round by Jamie Lewis, who had qualified for the event by coming third in the final PDPA Qualifier. Welshman Jamie Lewis went past the unseeded James Richardson in the third round, becoming the first player to go from the preliminary round to the quarter-final in the history of the championship; before whitewashing Darren Webster to reach the semi-final.

Two former world champions, two-time champion Gary Anderson and retiring sixteen-time champion Phil Taylor, met in the last quarter-final. Anderson's run to the quarter-final included a second round win over 63-year-old Singaporean, Paul Lim, a match noted for a leg in which Lim, who in 1990 had become the first player to throw a perfect nine-dart leg in the World Darts Championship, missed a dart at double twelve to repeat the feat. Taylor had faced English opposition in his three previous rounds, beating Chris Dobey in the first round before whitewashing Justin Pipe and Keegan Brown in the next two rounds to set up the quarter-final. Taylor took a 4–1 lead after winning six consecutive legs, and despite Anderson winning the next two sets, Taylor took advantage of missed darts in the eighth set to triumph, 5–3.

The semi-final between Taylor and Lewis was the first to be played, and, despite Lewis winning the first set, Taylor took the next three, with Lewis having missed darts in all three sets to have potentially been 4–0 up. Taylor won the next two sets as well, before Lewis took the first two legs in the seventh set, with Taylor taking advantage of three missed set darts from Lewis to steal the set and qualify for the twenty-first World Darts Championship final in his career.

In the second semi-final, debutant Cross took on reigning world champion van Gerwen. The first eight sets in the match all went with throw, with Cross taking a lead before being pegged back by van Gerwen. Michael van Gerwen got the first break in the ninth set, taking a 5–4 lead to throw for the match, but Cross fought back to win the tenth set 3–1 to force a deciding set. In the deciding set – which had to be won by two clear legs until the eleventh leg was reached – Cross missed a match-winning dart at the bull with the score at 3–2, before van Gerwen won two legs in succession to take a 5–4 lead. With both players under pressure, van Gerwen missed five darts to win the tenth leg, before Cross hit a double 18 to force a sudden death leg. Both Cross and van Gerwen missed match darts at double 16 before Cross hit double 8 to qualify for the final in his debut entry, becoming the first player to make the final on his debut since Kirk Shepherd in 2008.

In the final, held on New Year's Day 2018, Phil Taylor won the bull-off, but opted to allow Cross to throw first. Rob Cross held the first set 3–1, and broke in the second set by the same scoreline, before winning the third set 3–0. Taylor scored his first set with a 3–0 win in the fourth, before missing a dart at double twelve for a potential perfect nine-dart leg in the first leg of the fifth set. Cross won that leg and the next two to restore his three set lead, before breaking Taylor in the first leg of the sixth set, and the fourth leg of the seventh, taking a 6–1 lead in the best-of-thirteen match. Taylor held the eighth set 3–0, but Cross held the first leg in the ninth set, before hitting double-eight to break and go one leg away from the championship, and in the final leg, hit a 140 finish, treble-18, treble-18, double-16 to win the world championship.

== Preliminary round ==
The draw was made on 26 November 2017.

Best of three sets.

Av.	Player	Score	Player	Av.
86.65	Seigo Asada (Japan)	2 – 1	(Australia) Gordon Mathers	82.65
92.19	Brendan Dolan (Northern Ireland)	2 – 0	(Croatia) Alan Ljubić	85.36
95.39	Jeff Smith (Canada)	2 – 0	(England) Luke Humphries	88.56
87.21	Kenny Neyens (Belgium)	1 – 2	(Wales) Jamie Lewis	93.17
83.96	Willard Bruguier (United States)	1 – 2	(New Zealand) Cody Harris	84.30
81.74	Kai Fan Leung (Hong Kong)	0 – 2	(Singapore) Paul Lim	86.25
76.70	Aleksandr Oreshkin (Russia)	0 – 2	(Germany) Kevin Münch	84.66
86.97	Zong Xiao Chen (China)	0 – 2	(New Zealand) Bernie Smith	87.47

== Main draw ==
The draw for the main round was made live on Sky Sports News on 27 November 2017.

=== Finals ===
Quarter-finals (best of 9 sets); 29 December
1	(Netherlands) Michael van Gerwen 102.91	5
9	(Netherlands) Raymond van Barneveld 98.76	4
(Belgium) Dimitri Van den Bergh 98.60	4
20	(England) Rob Cross 97.13	5
(Wales) Jamie Lewis 101.26	5
23	(England) Darren Webster 91.88	0
6	(England) Phil Taylor 102.02	5
3	(Scotland) Gary Anderson 98.68	3

Semi-finals (best of 11 sets); 30 December
1	(Netherlands) Michael van Gerwen 102.44	5
20	(England) Rob Cross 100.97	6
(Wales) Jamie Lewis 97.35	1
6	(England) Phil Taylor 99.87	6

Final (best of 13 sets); 1 January
20	(England) Rob Cross 107.67	7
6	(England) Phil Taylor 102.26	2

=== Rounds 1–4 ===
First round (best of 5 sets); 14–21 December
1	(Netherlands) Michael van Gerwen 106.17	3
(Netherlands) Christian Kist 100.23	1
32	(England) James Wilson 97.94	3
(Poland) Krzysztof Ratajski 92.59	1
16	(Wales) Gerwyn Price 101.55	3
(England) Ted Evetts 85.60	0
17	(England) Ian White 96.89	3
(New Zealand) Cody Harris 85.47	1
8	(England) Dave Chisnall 96.75	0
(Netherlands) Vincent van der Voort 98.90	3
25	(England) Steve Beaton 93.28	3
(Republic of Ireland) William O'Connor 91.27	1
9	(Netherlands) Raymond van Barneveld 102.00	3
(England) Richard North 91.98	0
24	(Australia) Kyle Anderson 93.08	3
(England) Peter Jacques 85.79	1
5	(Austria) Mensur Suljović 93.03	3
(England) Kevin Painter 88.58	0
28	(Scotland) Robert Thornton 98.67	3
(Northern Ireland) Brendan Dolan 94.83	1
12	(Netherlands) Jelle Klaasen 96.73	1
(Netherlands) Jan Dekker 95.74	3
21	(England) Stephen Bunting 98.14	1
(Belgium) Dimitri Van den Bergh 104.17	3
4	(Northern Ireland) Daryl Gurney 100.51	3
(Belgium) Ronny Huybrechts 96.74	1
29	(Scotland) John Henderson 90.09	3
(Finland) Marko Kantele 87.21	0
13	(England) Michael Smith 92.63	3
(Republic of Ireland) Steve Lennon 94.95	2
20	(England) Rob Cross 104.12	3
(Japan) Seigo Asada 92.91	0
2	(Scotland) Peter Wright 97.90	3
(Brazil) Diogo Portela 91.66	1
31	(Wales) Jonny Clayton 81.83	0
(Wales) Jamie Lewis 99.02	3
15	(England) Alan Norris 95.41	3
(Finland) Kim Viljanen 90.38	0
18	(Belgium) Kim Huybrechts 86.40	0
(England) James Richardson 96.91	3
7	(England) Adrian Lewis 94.04	1
(Germany) Kevin Münch 93.48	3
26	(Spain) Cristo Reyes 85.26	1
(Spain) Toni Alcinas 85.85	3
10	(Australia) Simon Whitlock 87.42	3
(Germany) Martin Schindler 84.01	1
23	(England) Darren Webster 90.81	3
(South Africa) Devon Petersen 87.16	2
6	(England) Phil Taylor 96.33	3
(England) Chris Dobey 91.72	1
27	(England) Justin Pipe 89.24	3
(New Zealand) Bernie Smith 87.11	2
11	(England) James Wade 93.01	2
(England) Keegan Brown 95.45	3
22	(England) Mervyn King 82.89	2
(Austria) Zoran Lerchbacher 92.09	3
3	(Scotland) Gary Anderson 100.93	3
(Canada) Jeff Smith 78.38	0
30	(Wales) Mark Webster 91.67	2
(Singapore) Paul Lim 95.98	3
14	(Netherlands) Benito van de Pas 90.58	1
(England) Steve West 95.97	3
19	(England) Joe Cullen 96.11	2
(Netherlands) Jermaine Wattimena 96.83	3

Second round (best of 7 sets); 22–27 December
1	(Netherlands) van Gerwen 108.65	4
32	(England) Wilson 96.02	0
16	(Wales) Price 96.93	4
17	(England) White 93.62	1
(Netherlands) van der Voort 101.17	4
25	(England) Beaton 94.26	0
9	(Netherlands) van Barneveld 102.78	4
24	(Australia) K. Anderson 95.95	1
5	(Austria) Suljović 90.66	4
28	(Scotland) Thornton 93.51	2
(Netherlands) Dekker 97.27	2
(Belgium) Van den Bergh 94.91	4
4	(Northern Ireland) Gurney 95.58	2
29	(Scotland) Henderson 95.89	4
13	(England) M. Smith 103.29	3
20	(England) Cross 102.65	4
2	(Scotland) Wright 103.44	1
(Wales) J. Lewis 107.27	4
15	(England) Norris 86.76	1
(England) Richardson 86.78	4
(Germany) Münch 81.94	1
(Spain) Alcinas 91.11	4
10	(Australia) Whitlock 92.16	1
23	(England) D. Webster 90.20	4
6	(England) Taylor 99.37	4
27	(England) Pipe 90.30	0
(England) Brown 87.65	4
(Austria) Lerchbacher 87.10	2
3	(Scotland) G. Anderson 97.46	4
(Singapore) Lim 90.60	1
(England) West 87.92	4
(Netherlands) Wattimena 87.54	1

Third round (best of 7 sets); 27–28 December
1	(Netherlands) van Gerwen 100.06	4
16	(Wales) Price 97.06	2
(Netherlands) van der Voort 93.09	1
9	(Netherlands) van Barneveld 101.04	4
5	(Austria) Suljović 94.35	0
(Belgium) Van den Bergh 96.60	4
29	(Scotland) Henderson 92.81	1
20	(England) Cross 99.77	4
(Wales) J. Lewis 96.25	4
(England) Richardson 89.02	1
(Spain) Alcinas 88.25	0
23	(England) D. Webster 94.54	4
6	(England) Taylor 101.34	4
(England) Brown 96.56	0
3	(Scotland) G. Anderson 95.26	4
(England) West 92.60	2

Quarter-finals (best of 9 sets); 29 December
1	(Netherlands) van Gerwen 102.91	5
9	(Netherlands) van Barneveld 98.76	4
(Belgium) Van den Bergh 98.60	4
20	(England) Cross 97.13	5
(Wales) J. Lewis 101.26	5
23	(England) D. Webster 91.88	0
6	(England) Taylor 102.02	5
3	(Scotland) G. Anderson 98.68	3

== Final ==
Final: Best of 13 sets. Referees: George Noble (first half) and Kirk Bevins (second half). Alexandra Palace, London, England, 1 January 2018.
(20) Rob Cross (England)	7 – 2	(England) Phil Taylor (6)
3 – 1, 3 – 1, 3 – 0, 0 – 3, 3 – 0, 3 – 1, 3 – 1, 0 – 3, 3 – 0
107.67	Average (3 darts)	102.26
27	100+ scores	33
27	140+ scores	20
11	180 scores	12
167	Highest checkout	151
3	100+ Checkouts	2
60% (21/35)	Checkout summary	45.45% (10/22)

== Statistics ==
Player	Eliminated	Played	Sets Won	Sets Lost	Legs Won	Legs Lost	Leg Breaks	100+	140+	180s	High checkout	Checkout Av.%	Average (Note: Please note this is not calculated properly for players playing more than one match and is not indicative of actual tournament averages.)
(England) Rob Cross	Winner	6	29	15	101	82	38	201	122	66	167	44.49	102.05
(England) Phil Taylor	Runner-up	6	24	12	85	64	34	202	92	38	151	51.20	100.20
(Netherlands) Michael van Gerwen	Semi-finals	5	21	13	84	63	36	160	107	48	170	41.38	104.05
(Wales) Jamie Lewis	Semi-finals	6	19	9	74	52	32	138	95	50	170	43.53	99.05
(Netherlands) Raymond van Barneveld	Quarter-finals	4	15	7	54	35	26	129	87	21	161	43.90	101.15
(Belgium) Dimitri Van den Bergh	Quarter-finals	4	15	8	53	40	21	111	65	30	134	40.46	98.57
(Scotland) Gary Anderson	Quarter-finals	4	14	8	51	40	18	114	63	26	115	38.06	98.08
(England) Darren Webster	Quarter-finals	4	11	8	40	35	16	101	52	15	160	37.38	91.85
(Wales) Gerwyn Price	Third round	3	9	5	35	25	15	67	45	21	114	39.77	98.51
(Netherlands) Vincent van der Voort	Third round	3	8	4	26	23	12	63	26	15	156	57.78	97.72
(England) Keegan Brown	Third round	3	7	8	31	34	9	77	34	10	124	37.35	93.22
(Scotland) John Henderson	Third round	3	8	6	30	28	12	79	45	11	160	46.15	92.93
(Austria) Mensur Suljović	Third round	3	7	6	28	26	12	78	42	5	121	37.84	92.68
(England) Steve West	Third round	3	9	6	36	26	10	77	46	15	170	42.35	92.16
(England) James Richardson	Third round	3	8	5	31	26	11	67	38	17	106	32.63	90.90
(Spain) Toni Alcinas	Third round	3	7	6	29	26	12	66	39	8	121	36.25	88.40
(Scotland) Peter Wright	Second round	2	4	5	21	19	9	54	39	11	121	42.00	100.67
(Northern Ireland) Daryl Gurney	Second round	2	5	5	22	20	9	44	33	14	170	42.31	98.05
(England) Michael Smith	Second round	2	6	6	27	21	10	58	24	23	150	36.99	97.96
(England) James Wilson	Second round	2	3	5	10	20	3	38	19	9	95	40.00	96.98
(Netherlands) Jan Dekker	Second round	2	5	5	17	21	6	41	31	3	128	48.57	96.51
(Scotland) Robert Thornton	Second round	2	5	5	21	23	7	58	28	11	144	50.00	96.09
(England) Ian White	Second round	2	4	5	19	18	9	45	30	8	151	52.78	95.26
(Australia) Kyle Anderson	Second round	2	4	5	17	18	8	35	8	9	114	44.74	94.52
(England) Steve Beaton	Second round	2	3	5	14	17	7	42	26	6	131	35.00	93.77
(Netherlands) Jermaine Wattimena	Second round	2	4	6	16	22	6	51	25	2	141	35.56	92.19
(England) Alan Norris	Second round	2	4	4	19	17	8	39	22	9	131	32.20	91.09
(Singapore) Paul Lim	Second round	3	6	6	24	26	11	56	30	16	118	33.33	90.94
(Australia) Simon Whitlock	Second round	2	4	5	19	18	5	40	16	11	127	33.93	89.79
(England) Justin Pipe	Second round	2	3	6	15	21	8	42	19	4	96	34.09	89.77
(Austria) Zoran Lerchbacher	Second round	2	5	6	26	21	7	77	28	6	122	42.62	89.60
(Germany) Kevin Münch	Second round	3	6	5	23	22	9	50	23	12	158	36.51	86.69
(Netherlands) Christian Kist	First round	1	1	3	4	11	0	17	13	2	86	44.44	100.23
(England) Stephen Bunting	First round	1	1	3	8	10	2	20	14	4	170	53.33	98.14
(England) Dave Chisnall	First round	1	0	3	4	9	1	21	6	2	132	66.67	96.75
(Belgium) Ronny Huybrechts	First round	1	1	3	6	10	2	22	12	2	112	37.50	96.74
(Netherlands) Jelle Klaasen	First round	1	1	3	7	9	2	19	11	4	101	31.82	96.73
(England) Joe Cullen	First round	1	2	3	10	10	4	31	7	5	135	52.63	96.11
(Republic of Ireland) Steve Lennon	First round	1	2	3	9	11	3	22	16	6	91	37.50	94.95
(England) Adrian Lewis	First round	1	1	3	7	10	2	26	9	3	121	43.75	94.04
(Northern Ireland) Brendan Dolan	First round	2	3	3	15	10	6	37	17	4	126	62.50	93.51
(England) James Wade	First round	1	2	3	9	12	2	21	12	1	110	64.29	93.01
(Poland) Krzysztof Ratajski	First round	1	1	3	8	10	3	20	8	1	106	57.14	92.59
(England) Richard North	First round	1	0	3	3	9	0	12	7	4	40	23.08	91.98
(England) Chris Dobey	First round	1	1	3	8	11	1	17	8	6	104	53.33	91.72
(Wales) Mark Webster	First round	1	2	3	10	13	5	28	11	4	77	40.00	91.67
(Brazil) Diogo Portela	First round	1	1	3	5	11	1	16	7	3	99	62.50	91.66
(Republic of Ireland) William O'Connor	First round	1	1	3	5	9	3	14	7	6	115	21.74	91.27
(Netherlands) Benito van de Pas	First round	1	1	3	5	11	1	17	11	1	124	38.46	90.58
(Finland) Kim Viljanen	First round	1	0	3	3	9	2	12	8	3	76	27.27	90.38
(Japan) Seigo Asada	First round	2	2	4	12	14	5	37	13	3	120	41.38	89.78
(England) Kevin Painter	First round	1	0	3	2	9	2	8	9	3	88	16.67	88.58
(New Zealand) Bernie Smith	First round	2	4	3	15	14	8	39	16	4	146	39.47	87.29
(Finland) Marko Kantele	First round	1	0	3	3	9	1	9	8	2	62	60.00	87.21
(South Africa) Devon Petersen	First round	1	2	3	8	11	4	21	15	4	60	32.00	87.16
(Canada) Jeff Smith	First round	2	2	3	8	12	1	21	14	1	170	44.44	86.89
(Belgium) Kim Huybrechts	First round	1	0	3	2	9	0	10	5	2	16	18.18	86.40
(England) Peter Jacques	First round	1	1	3	6	11	2	18	5	5	75	28.57	85.79
(England) Ted Evetts	First round	1	0	3	3	9	1	11	6	1	76	75.00	85.60
(Spain) Cristo Reyes	First round	1	1	3	7	11	2	20	8	3	118	35.00	85.26
(New Zealand) Cody Harris	First round	2	3	4	13	15	7	48	13	4	121	29.55	84.89
(Germany) Martin Schindler	First round	1	1	3	6	11	1	18	10	3	60	17.65	84.01
(England) Mervyn King	First round	1	2	3	7	13	1	18	12	1	112	36.84	82.89
(Wales) Jonny Clayton	First round	1	0	3	4	9	1	12	9	2	104	28.57	81.83
(England) Luke Humphries	Prelim. Round	1	0	2	3	6	0	12	5	0	94	75.00	88.56
(Belgium) Kenny Neyens	Prelim. Round	1	1	2	5	8	2	14	4	5	74	29.41	87.21
(China) Zong Xiao Chen	Prelim. Round	1	0	2	1	6	0	11	2	2	40	16.67	86.97
(Croatia) Alan Ljubić	Prelim. Round	1	0	2	1	6	1	10	2	0	56	25.00	85.36
(United States) Willard Bruguier	Prelim. Round	1	1	2	5	8	2	25	5	0	112	29.41	83.96
(Australia) Gordon Mathers	Prelim. Round	1	1	2	5	7	2	13	10	1	46	45.45	82.65
(Hong Kong) Kai Fan Leung	Prelim. Round	1	0	2	3	6	2	15	2	0	52	30.00	81.74
(Russia) Aleksandr Oreshkin	Prelim. Round	1	0	2	1	6	1	5	5	0	10	10.00	76.70

=== Top averages ===
This table shows the highest averages achieved by players throughout the tournament.

#	Player	Round	Score	Result
1	(Netherlands) Michael van Gerwen	2	108.65	Won
2	(England) Rob Cross	F	107.67	Won
3	(Wales) Jamie Lewis	2	107.27	Won
4	(Netherlands) Michael van Gerwen	1	106.17	Won
5	(Belgium) Dimitri Van den Bergh	1	104.17	Won
6	(England) Rob Cross	1	104.12	Won
7	(Scotland) Peter Wright	2	103.44	Lost
8	(England) Michael Smith	2	103.29	Lost
9	(Netherlands) Michael van Gerwen	QF	102.91	Won
10	(Netherlands) Raymond van Barneveld	2	102.78	Won

=== Representation from different countries ===
This table shows the number of players by country in the World Championship, the total number including the preliminary round. Twenty-four countries were represented in the World Championship, two more than in the previous championship.

	(England) ENG	(Netherlands) NED	(Scotland) SCO	(Wales) WAL	(Belgium) BEL	(Australia) AUS	(Austria) AUT	(Northern Ireland) NIR	(Germany) GER	(Spain) SPA	(Finland) FIN	(Republic of Ireland) IRL	(New Zealand) NZL	(Singapore) SGP	(Canada) CAN	(Japan) JPN	(Brazil) BRA	(Poland) POL	(South Africa) RSA	(China) CHN	(Croatia) CRO	(Hong Kong) HKG	(Russia) RUS	(United States) USA	Total
Final	2	0	0	0	0	0	0	0	0	0	0	0	0	0	0	0	0	0	0	0	0	0	0	0	2
Semi-final	2	1	0	1	0	0	0	0	0	0	0	0	0	0	0	0	0	0	0	0	0	0	0	0	4
Quarter-final	3	2	1	1	1	0	0	0	0	0	0	0	0	0	0	0	0	0	0	0	0	0	0	0	8
Round 3	6	3	2	2	1	0	1	0	0	1	0	0	0	0	0	0	0	0	0	0	0	0	0	0	16
Round 2	12	5	4	2	1	2	2	1	1	1	0	0	0	1	0	0	0	0	0	0	0	0	0	0	32
Round 1	23	8	4	4	3	2	2	2	2	2	2	2	2	1	1	1	1	1	1	0	0	0	0	0	64
Prelim.	1	0	0	1	1	1	0	1	1	0	0	0	2	1	1	1	0	0	0	1	1	1	1	1	16
Total	24	8	4	4	4	3	2	2	2	2	2	2	2	1	1	1	1	1	1	1	1	1	1	1	72

== Media coverage ==
The tournament was available in the following countries on these channels:

Country	Channel
United Kingdom; Ireland	Sky Sports Darts †; Talksport
Australia	Fox Sports
Belgium	Eleven Sport Network
Bulgaria; Denmark; Finland; Norway; Sweden; Baltic States	Viasat
China	CCTV
Croatia	RTL Televizija
Cyprus; Greece; Israel; Italy; Malta; Turkey	Fox Sports
Czech Republic; Slovakia	Nova Sport
France; Portugal; Romania; Spain	Eurosport
Germany; Austria; Switzerland	Sport 1
Germany; Switzerland; Austria; Japan; Canada	DAZN
Hungary	Pragosport
Mongolia	MNBA Sports TV
Netherlands	RTL 7
New Zealand	Sky Sport
Poland	TVP Sport
United States	BBC America
MENA	OSN Sports
Sub-Saharan Africa	Kwesé Sports

Additionally, there was coverage in Andorra, Armenia, Azerbaijan, Belarus, Estonia, France, Georgia, Israel, Kazakhstan, Kyrgyzstan, Latvia, Moldova, Monaco, Portugal, Romania, Russia, Spain, Tajikistan, Turkey, Turkmenistan, Ukraine and Uzbekistan on Eurosport Player, and coverage in all countries except the UK, Ireland and the Netherlands on the Professional Darts Corporation's streaming service, PDCTV-HD.

† Sky Sports Arena was renamed as Sky Sports Darts for the duration of the tournament.
