= Darren Webster =

English darts player

Personal information
- Full name: Darren Michael Webster
- Nickname: "Demolition Man"
- Born: 10 June 1968 (age 58) Norwich, England
- Home town: Heanor, England

Sport
- Sport: Darts
- Playing since: 2002
- Darts: 18g Cosmo
- Laterality: Right-handed
- Walk-on music: "Dancing in the Dark" by Bruce Springsteen

Organisation (see split in darts)
- PDC: 2002–2024

WDF major events – best performances
- Dutch Open: Last 64: 2026

PDC premier events – best performances
- World Championship: Quarter-final: 2007, 2018
- World Matchplay: Quarter-final: 2017, 2018
- World Grand Prix: Last 16: 2018
- UK Open: Last 16: 2007, 2016
- Grand Slam: Last 16: 2017, 2019
- European Championship: Quarter-final: 2018
- Desert Classic: Last 32: 2004, 2005
- PC Finals: Semi-final: 2016
- Masters: Last 16: 2019

Other tournament wins
- Years
Eastbourne Open	2011
England Classic Early Bird	2011
Gleneagle Irish Masters	2013
Open Oust Nederland	2005
Southend Open	2012
Players Championships
2017

Darren Michael Webster (born 10 June 1968) is an English darts player who formerly competed in Professional Darts Corporation (PDC) events. Nicknamed Demolition Man, he is a two-time quarter-finalist at both the PDC World Championship and World Matchplay. Webster reached his only PDC major semi-final at the 2016 Players Championship Finals.

== Career ==
Webster won the 2005 Open Oust Nederland, beating Co Stompé in the final.

Originally nicknamed The Sniper, Webster reached the quarter-finals of the 2007 PDC World Darts Championship, where he beat former champion Bob Anderson, Adrian Gray and South African Wynand Havenga, before being beaten 5–1 by Phil Taylor.

Webster reached the last 16 at the 2007 UK Open. He beat Andy Hamilton and James Wade, before losing to Alan Green.

In December 2013, Webster lost to James Wade in the first round of the 2014 World Championship, despite leading 2 sets to 1 (first to 3). He missed six darts to win the match, to which Wade responded in three straight legs, thus winning the match. He played in the World Matchplay for the first time since 2005 and was beaten 10–4 by Taylor in the first round. Webster's resurgence of form also saw him play in his first World Grand Prix and Grand Slam of Darts, but he lost in the opening round of the former and was defeated in all three of his group games in the latter. A final appearance in a major event of the year came at the Players Championship Finals where he missed two match darts in the deciding leg of the first round against Robert Thornton to lose 6–5.

Webster atoned for his misses against Wade a year earlier when he faced Simon Whitlock in the 2015 edition of the World Championship. From 1–1 in sets he only allowed the world number seven one more leg as he beat him 3–1. He won a trio of sets in deciding legs to lead Dean Winstanley 3–2 in the second round. However, Webster lost two sets in a row to be beaten 4–3. Webster twice reached the quarter-final stage of Players Championship events in 2015.

Webster saw off John Henderson 3–1 in the opening round of the 2016 World Championship, but Michael van Gerwen averaged 109.23 in their second round clash as Webster could only win one leg in a 4–0 defeat. A 9–8 win over Ricky Evans saw him reach the fifth round of the UK Open for the second time in his career and he lost 9–5 to Peter Wright. Webster's first semi-final in over two and a half years came at the ninth Players Championship and he was beaten 6–1 by Benito van de Pas. Another came at the 17th event, but he was whitewashed 6–0 by Van Gerwen. Webster was already eliminated from the Grand Slam of Darts before his third group game with Phil Taylor after losing his opening two matches, but nevertheless thrashed the 16-time world champion 5–0. Webster stated that the result would give him a confidence boost for the remainder of the year. He was right, because at the Players Championship Finals he saw off Jonny Clayton and Simon Whitlock both 6–3, Alan Norris 10–5 and Christian Kist 10–6 to reach the semi-finals of a PDC major for the first time. Webster stormed in to a 6–0 lead over Van Gerwen, but missed a dart to be 7–2 ahead as Van Gerwen closed to 6–6. Webster did take a one leg lead on two further occasions, but would ultimately be defeated 11–8.

Webster survived seven match darts from Stephen Bunting in the first round of the 2017 World Championship to progress with a 3–2 win. Webster had finishes of 157, 147 and 140 during the match. He described his second round 4–0 victory over Simon Whitlock as the moment of his career as Webster averaged 104.64 and closed the match with a 140 finish. He missed two darts to take the opening set in the third round against Van Gerwen and went 3–0 behind. He pulled a set back, but would be ousted 4–1.

Webster hit his first career nine-dart finish on 11 February 2017 in the 5th UK Open qualifier during a 6–5 win over Benito van de Pas. In July, he won his first players Championship title, defeating Daryl Gurney 6–1 in the final in Barnsley.

In the 2019 World Championship he suffered a surprise defeat and whitewash to Vincent van der Voort losing 3–0 in the Second Round.

Webster lost his Tour card following the 2022 PDC World Darts Championship but regained it on the second day of the 2022 Q-School Final stage.

Unable to find his previous form, Webster struggled throughout seasons 2022 and 2023. However, he won PDC Tour card holders qualification for 2024 PDC World Darts Championship, returning to the World Championship for the first time since 2020 and stating it will be his last tournament in career. He played Niels Zonneveld in the First round, had several chances to take the clash to a final set but missed every single time and lost 1–3, which meant he also lost his Tour card.

== World Championship results ==
=== PDC ===
- 2006: First round (lost to Erwin Extercatte 2–3)
- 2007: Quarter-finals (lost to Phil Taylor 1–5)
- 2013: First round (lost to Mark Walsh 1–3)
- 2014: First round (lost to James Wade 2–3)
- 2015: Second round (lost to Dean Winstanley 3–4)
- 2016: Second round (lost to Michael van Gerwen 0–4)
- 2017: Third round (lost to Michael van Gerwen 1–4)
- 2018: Quarter-finals (lost to Jamie Lewis 0–5)
- 2019: Second round (lost to Vincent van der Voort 0–3)
- 2020: Third round (lost to Adrian Lewis 3–4)
- 2024: First round (lost to Niels Zonneveld 1–3)

== Performance timeline ==
Tournament	2003	2004	2005	2006	2007	2008	2010	2012	2013	2014	2015	2016	2017	2018	2019	2020	2021	2022	2023	2024
PDC Ranked televised events
World Championship	DNP			1R	QF	DNQ			1R	1R	2R	2R	3R	QF	2R	3R	DNQ			1R
UK Open	2R	3R	5R	2R	6R	2R	2R	4R	DNQ	3R	2R	5R	3R	3R	4R	4R	4R	1R	3R	DNQ
World Matchplay	DNP		1R	Did not qualify						1R	DNQ		QF	QF	1R	DNQ				
World Grand Prix	Did not qualify									1R	DNQ		1R	2R	Did not qualify					
European Championship	Not held					Did not qualify							1R	QF	1R	Did not qualify				
Grand Slam of Darts	Not held				DNQ			RR	DNQ	RR	2R	DNQ	2R	Did not qualify						
Players Championship Finals	Not held						DNQ			1R	DNQ	SF	3R	2R	DNQ	1R	Did not qualify			
Non-ranked televised events
Masters	Not held										Did not qualify				1R	Did not qualify				
Past major events
Las Vegas Desert Classic	DNP	1R	1R	DNQ			Not held													
Career statistics
Year-end ranking	56	28	31	41	44	88	134	57	38	35	36	32	21	13	20	46	94	156	105	NR

=== PDC European Tour ===
Season	1	2	3	4	5	6	7	8	9	10	11	12	13
2012	ADO; 1R	GDC; 1R	EDO; DNQ	GDM; 1R	DDM; DNQ								
2013	UKM; 1R	EDT; 2R	EDO; DNQ	ADO; 1R	GDT; DNQ	GDC; 2R	GDM; DNQ	DDM; DNQ					
2014	GDC; DNQ	DDM; 3R	GDM; DNQ	ADO; DNQ	GDT; DNQ	EDO; 2R	EDG; 3R	EDT; DNQ					
2015	GDC; DNQ	GDT; DNQ	GDM; 2R	DDM; 1R	IDO; 1R	EDO; DNQ	EDT; DNQ	EDM; 2R	EDG; DNQ				
2016	DDM; DNQ	GDM; DNQ	GDT; DNQ	EDM; 2R	ADO; DNQ	EDO; DNQ	IDO; 2R	EDT; 1R	EDG; 2R	GDC; DNQ			
2017	GDC; DNQ	GDM; DNQ	GDO; 2R	EDG; DNQ	GDT; 2R	EDM; 1R	ADO; DNQ	EDO; DNQ	DDM; 1R	GDG; 3R	IDO; 2R	EDT; DNQ	
2018	EDO; DNQ	GDG; 3R	GDO; 3R	ADO; 3R	EDG; 3R	DDM; 3R	GDT; 2R	DDO; 3R	EDM; 3R	GDC; 3R	DDC; 2R	IDO; QF	EDT; 3R
2019	EDO; 3R	GDC; QF	GDG; 3R	GDO; 3R	ADO; 2R	EDG; QF	DDM; 2R	DDO; 2R	CDO; 2R	ADC; 2R	EDM; DNQ	IDO; DNQ	GDT; 1R
2021	HDT; 1R	GDT; DNQ											

=== PDC Players Championships ===
Season	1	2	3	4	5	6	7	8	9	10	11	12	13	14	15	16	17	18	19	20	21	22	23	24	25	26	27	28	29	30	31	32	33	34
2017	BAR; 3R	BAR; 1R	BAR; 2R	BAR; 1R	MIL; 2R	MIL; 4R	BAR; 1R	BAR; 1R	WIG; 3R	WIG; 3R	MIL; 1R	MIL; QF	WIG; 4R	WIG; 4R	BAR; W	BAR; 4R	BAR; 3R	BAR; 4R	DUB; 3R	DUB; 1R	BAR; 3R	BAR; 4R												
2018	BAR; 1R	BAR; 3R	BAR; 3R	BAR; 4R	MIL; 2R	MIL; 1R	BAR; 3R	BAR; 1R	WIG; 1R	WIG; 2R	MIL; SF	MIL; 4R	WIG; 2R	WIG; 2R	BAR; 3R	BAR; F	BAR; 1R	BAR; 4R	DUB; 3R	DUB; 2R	BAR; 3R	BAR; 1R												
2019	WIG; DNP		WIG; 4R	WIG; 1R	BAR; 1R	BAR; 1R	WIG; 2R	WIG; 1R	BAR; 1R	BAR; 1R	BAR; 3R	BAR; 1R	BAR; 2R	BAR; 1R	BAR; 2R	BAR; 1R	WIG; 1R	WIG; 1R	BAR; 2R	BAR; 1R	HIL; 3R	HIL; 3R	BAR; 2R	BAR; 3R	BAR; 1R	BAR; 1R	DUB; 1R	DUB; 1R	BAR; 1R	BAR; 4R				
2020	BAR; 4R	BAR; 1R	WIG; 3R	WIG; 1R	WIG; 1R	WIG; 2R	BAR; 1R	BAR; 1R	MIL; 4R	MIL; 1R	MIL; 3R	MIL; 3R	MIL; 3R	NIE; 1R	NIE; 2R	NIE; 1R	NIE; 1R	NIE; 1R	COV; 1R	COV; 2R	COV; 2R	COV; 1R	COV; 1R											
2021	BOL; 1R	BOL; 1R	BOL; 1R	BOL; 1R	MIL; 2R	MIL; 1R	MIL; 1R	MIL; 2R	NIE; DNP				MIL; 1R	MIL; 4R	MIL; 1R	MIL; 2R	COV; 1R	COV; 1R	COV; 1R	COV; 2R	BAR; 3R	BAR; 1R	BAR; 1R	BAR; 1R	BAR; 2R	BAR; 1R	BAR; 1R	BAR; 3R	BAR; 2R	BAR; 1R				
2022	BAR; 1R	BAR; 2R	WIG; 1R	WIG; 2R	BAR; 1R	BAR; 1R	NIE; 1R	NIE; 1R	BAR; 1R	BAR; 1R	BAR; 1R	BAR; DNP		WIG; 1R	WIG; 3R	NIE; DNP		BAR; 2R	BAR; 1R	BAR; 1R	BAR; 1R	BAR; 1R	BAR; 2R	BAR; 1R	BAR; 2R	BAR; 1R	BAR; 2R	BAR; 1R	BAR; 1R	BAR; 2R				
2023	BAR; 2R	BAR; 1R	BAR; 1R	BAR; 2R	BAR; 2R	BAR; 1R	HIL; 1R	HIL; 1R	WIG; 1R	WIG; 1R	LEI; 1R	LEI; 3R	HIL; DNP		LEI; 1R	LEI; 1R	HIL; 1R	HIL; 1R	BAR; 1R	BAR; 2R	BAR; 1R	BAR; 2R	BAR; 1R	BAR; 1R	BAR; 1R	BAR; 1R	BAR; 1R	BAR; 4R	BAR; 1R	BAR; 1R				

Performance Table Legend
W	Won the tournament	F	Finalist	SF	Semifinalist	QF	Quarterfinalist	#R; RR; Prel.	Lost in # round Round-robin; Preliminary round	DQ	Disqualified
DNQ	Did not qualify	DNP	Did not participate	WD	Withdrew	NH	Tournament not held	#R; RR; Prel.	Lost in # round Round-robin; Preliminary round	NYF	Not yet founded
