= 2017 International Darts Open =

Tournament information
- Dates: 22–24 September 2017
- Venue: SACHSENarena
- Location: Riesa, Germany
- Organisation(s): Professional Darts Corporation (PDC)
- Format: Legs; First to 6 legs
- Prize fund: £135,000
- Winner's share: £25,000
- High checkout: 170 Rob Cross

Champion(s)
- Peter Wright (SCO)

The 2017 International Darts Open was the eleventh of twelve PDC European Tour events on the 2017 PDC Pro Tour. The tournament took place at the SACHSENarena, Riesa, Germany, from 22 to 24 September 2017. It featured a field of 48 players and £135,000 in prize money, with £25,000 going to the winner.

Mensur Suljović was the defending champion after defeating Kim Huybrechts 6–5 in the final of the 2016 tournament, but he was defeated 6–5 in the third round by Gerwyn Price.

Peter Wright then went on to win the contest, defeating Kim Huybrechts 6–5 in the final.

== Prize money ==
This is how the prize money is divided:

Stage (num. of players)		Prize money
Winner	(1)	£25,000
Runner-up	(1)	£10,000
Semi-finalists	(2)	£6,000
Quarter-finalists	(4)	£4,000
Third round losers	(8)	£3,000
Second round losers	(16)	£2,000
First round losers	(16)	£1,000
Total	£135,000	

== Qualification and format ==
The top 16 entrants from the PDC ProTour Order of Merit on 30 June automatically qualified for the event and were seeded in the second round.

The remaining 32 places went to players from five qualifying events – 18 from the UK Qualifier (held in Barnsley on 4 August), eight from the West/South European Qualifier (held on 21 September), four from the Host Nation Qualifier (held on 21 September), one from the Nordic & Baltic Qualifier (held on 11 August) and one from the East European Qualifier (held on 26 August).

The following players took part in the tournament:

Top 16
1. (Scotland) Peter Wright (champion)
2. (Austria) Mensur Suljović (third round)
3. (Australia) Simon Whitlock (quarter-finals)
4. (England) Michael Smith (second round)
5. (Northern Ireland) Daryl Gurney (second round)
6. (England) Alan Norris (third round)
7. (Belgium) Kim Huybrechts (runner-up)
8. (Netherlands) Jelle Klaasen (quarter-finals)
9. (Netherlands) Benito van de Pas (second round)
10. (England) Ian White (third round)
11. (England) Joe Cullen (semi-finals)
12. (England) Dave Chisnall (third round)
13. (England) Rob Cross (second round)
14. (England) Mervyn King (third round)
15. (Wales) Gerwyn Price (quarter-finals)
16. (Spain) Cristo Reyes (second round)

UK Qualifier
- (England) Andy Hamilton (first round)
- (England) Darren Webster (second round)
- (England) Steve Beaton (first round)
- (England) Simon Stevenson (first round)
- (England) Peter Jacques (third round)
- (Australia) Kyle Anderson (second round)
- (England) Keegan Brown (second round)
- (England) Josh Payne (third round)
- (England) Justin Pipe (first round)
- (England) Richie Corner (second round)
- (England) Ted Evetts (first round)
- (England) Chris Quantock (second round)
- (Wales) Mark Webster (first round)
- (Republic of Ireland) William O'Connor (second round)
- (Republic of Ireland) Mick McGowan (first round)
- (Northern Ireland) Brendan Dolan (second round)
- (Republic of Ireland) Steve Lennon (second round)
- (England) Luke Woodhouse (first round)

West/South European Qualifier
- (Netherlands) Christian Kist (second round)
- (Belgium) Dimitri Van den Bergh (first round)
- (Netherlands) Vincent van der Voort (first round)
- (Belgium) Ronny Huybrechts (third round)
- (Netherlands) Jerry Hendriks (first round)
- (Netherlands) Michael Plooy (first round)
- (Greece) John Michael (second round)
- (Netherlands) Ron Meulenkamp (semi-finals)

Host Nation Qualifier
- (Germany) Martin Schindler (first round)
- (Germany) Bernd Roith (first round)
- (Germany) Max Hopp (second round)
- (Germany) Dragutin Horvat (first round)

Nordic & Baltic Qualifier
- (Sweden) Dennis Nilsson (quarter-finals)

East European Qualifier
- (Hungary) Nándor Bezzeg (first round)

== Draw ==
First round (best of 11 legs); 22 September
(England) Chris Quantock 91.49	6
(Germany) Dragutin Horvat 86.92	3
(Belgium) Ronny Huybrechts 94.10	6
(England) Ted Evetts 89.27	4
(Northern Ireland) Brendan Dolan 90.18	6
(England) Andy Hamilton 70.97	0
(Netherlands) Vincent van der Voort 85.19	4
(England) Peter Jacques 85.75	6
(England) Steve Beaton 93.29	5
(Sweden) Dennis Nilsson 86.98	6
(England) Darren Webster 95.04	6
(England) Luke Woodhouse 88.60	4
(Netherlands) Ron Meulenkamp 87.64	6
(Republic of Ireland) Mick McGowan 85.15	1
(England) Josh Payne 87.85	6
(Germany) Bernd Roith 83.63	4
(Belgium) Dimitri Van den Bergh 90.63	4
(Republic of Ireland) William O'Connor 89.08	6
(England) Simon Stevenson 93.72	2
(Republic of Ireland) Steve Lennon 99.36	6
(England) Justin Pipe 89.68	5
(Netherlands) Christian Kist 92.29	6
(England) Keegan Brown 86.02	6
(Netherlands) Michael Plooy 86.57	4
(Wales) Mark Webster 89.50	4
(Germany) Max Hopp 90.63	6
(England) Richie Corner 89.54	6
(Germany) Martin Schindler 86.74	4
(Australia) Kyle Anderson 100.59	6
(Netherlands) Jerry Hendriks 91.39	1
(Greece) John Michael 80.71	6
(Hungary) Nándor Bezzeg 74.23	3

Second round (best of 11 legs); 23 September
1	(Scotland) Peter Wright 88.22	6
(England) Chris Quantock 87.31	2
16	(Spain) Cristo Reyes 82.40	4
(Belgium) Ronny Huybrechts 94.24	6
8	(Netherlands) Jelle Klaasen 97.13	6
(Northern Ireland) Brendan Dolan 88.84	4
9	(Netherlands) Benito van de Pas 90.91	2
(England) Peter Jacques 97.55	6
5	(Northern Ireland) Daryl Gurney 100.91	5
(Sweden) Dennis Nilsson 92.19	6
12	(England) Dave Chisnall 100.21	6
(England) Darren Webster 93.74	4
4	(England) Michael Smith 90.31	3
(Netherlands) Ron Meulenkamp 82.86	6
13	(England) Rob Cross 92.82	4
(England) Josh Payne 94.39	6
2	(Austria) Mensur Suljović 102.32	6
(Republic of Ireland) William O'Connor 96.00	3
15	(Wales) Gerwyn Price 99.17	6
(Republic of Ireland) Steve Lennon 93.61	4
7	(Belgium) Kim Huybrechts 99.74	6
(Netherlands) Christian Kist 89.64	1
10	(England) Ian White 93.85	6
(England) Keegan Brown 87.26	3
6	(England) Alan Norris 105.06	6
(Germany) Max Hopp 87.91	1
11	(England) Joe Cullen 113.77	6
(England) Richie Corner 91.66	1
3	(Australia) Simon Whitlock 100.95	6
(Australia) Kyle Anderson 94.97	4
14	(England) Mervyn King 92.23	6
(Greece) John Michael 94.23	2

Third round (best of 11 legs); 24 September
1	(Scotland) Wright 90.02	6
(Belgium) R. Huybrechts 88.11	4
8	(Netherlands) Klaasen 93.93	6
(England) Jacques 84.90	4
(Sweden) Nilsson 92.83	6
12	(England) Chisnall 91.70	5
(Netherlands) Meulenkamp 96.20	6
(England) Payne 88.72	3
2	(Austria) Suljović 102.12	5
15	(Wales) Price 100.21	6
7	(Belgium) K. Huybrechts 97.51	6
10	(England) White 100.58	5
6	(England) Norris 88.55	3
11	(England) Cullen 94.61	6
3	(Australia) Whitlock 99.82	6
14	(England) King 92.88	1

Quarter-finals (best of 11 legs); 24 September
1	(Scotland) Wright 94.26	6
8	(Netherlands) Klaasen 93.64	4
(Sweden) Nilsson 85.50	2
(Netherlands) Meulenkamp 99.75	6
15	(Wales) Price 99.04	4
7	(Belgium) K. Huybrechts 99.79	6
11	(England) Cullen 98.82	6
3	(Australia) Whitlock 91.89	3

Semi-finals (best of 11 legs); 24 September
1	(Scotland) Wright 103.65	6
(Netherlands) Meulenkamp 105.89	3
7	(Belgium) K. Huybrechts 90.99	6
11	(England) Cullen 94.82	2

Final (best of 11 legs); 24 September
1	(Scotland) Wright 102.65	6
7	(Belgium) K. Huybrechts 92.44	5
