= 2017 Players Championship Finals =

2017 Mr Green Sport Players Championship Finals

Tournament information
- Dates: 24–26 November 2017
- Venue: Butlin's Minehead
- Location: Minehead, England
- Organisation(s): Professional Darts Corporation (PDC)
- Format: Legs
- Prize fund: £460,000
- Winner's share: £100,000
- High checkout: 170; Kyle Anderson; Michael Smith; Adrian Lewis

Champion(s)
- (Netherlands) Michael van Gerwen

The 2017 Mr Green Sport Players Championship Finals was the tenth edition of the PDC darts tournament, the Players Championship Finals, which saw for the second time the top 64 players from the 22 Players Championship events of 2017 taking part. The tournament took place 24 to 26 November 2017 at Butlin's Minehead in Minehead, England.

Sixteen time world champion Phil Taylor and nine time major finalist Terry Jenkins were notable absences at the tournament after not playing in enough Players Championship events to qualify.

Michael van Gerwen was the defending champion after beating Dave Chisnall 11–3 in the 2016 final, and he defended his title by defeating Jonny Clayton 11–2 in the final.

Following Rob Cross' defeat by Jonny Clayton in the semi-finals, it was the first time since 2012 that the #1 seed did not win the tournament.

== Prize money ==
The 2017 Players Championship Finals had a total prize fund of £460,000, an increase of £60,000 from last year's tournament, with the winner's prize increasing from £75,000 to £100,000. The following is the breakdown of the fund:

Position (no. of players)		Prize money (Total: £460,000)
Winner	(1)	£100,000
Runner-Up	(1)	£40,000
Semi-finalists	(2)	£23,000
Quarter-finalists	(4)	£12,500
Last 16 (third round)	(8)	£8,000
Last 32 (second round)	(16)	£5,000
Last 64 (first round)	(32)	£2,500
Nine-dart finish	(0)	£15,000

== Qualification ==
The top 64 players from the Players Championships Order of Merit, which is solely based on prize money won in the twenty-two Players Championships events during the season, qualified for the tournament.

Click on the seed number of a player to go to their draw section.

=== Top 64 in the Players Championship Order of Merit ===
1. (England) Rob Cross (semi-finals)
2. (Northern Ireland) Daryl Gurney (quarter-finals)
3. (Scotland) Peter Wright (first round)
4. (Scotland) Gary Anderson (first round)
5. (Austria) Mensur Suljović (second round)
6. (Netherlands) Michael van Gerwen (winner)
7. (England) Dave Chisnall (second round)
8. (England) Joe Cullen (first round)
9. (England) Ian White (third round)
10. (Australia) Kyle Anderson (first round)
11. (England) Darren Webster (third round)
12. (Wales) Jonny Clayton (runner-up)
13. (England) Alan Norris (first round)
14. (England) Michael Smith (first round)
15. (Belgium) Kim Huybrechts (first round)
16. (England) Richard North (second round)
17. (England) Adrian Lewis (third round)
18. (Scotland) Robert Thornton (second round)
19. (Australia) Simon Whitlock (second round)
20. (England) Steve Beaton (quarter-finals)
21. (Wales) Gerwyn Price (second round)
22. (England) Mervyn King (second round)
23. (England) Justin Pipe (semi-finals)
24. (Scotland) John Henderson (second round)
25. (England) James Wade (quarter-finals)
26. (England) James Wilson (first round)
27. (England) Steve West (second round)
28. (England) Stephen Bunting (third round)
29. (Netherlands) Jermaine Wattimena (third round)
30. (England) Peter Jacques (third round)
31. (Netherlands) Vincent van der Voort (first round)
32. (Republic of Ireland) Steve Lennon (second round)
33. (Austria) Zoran Lerchbacher (first round)
34. (England) Robbie Green (second round)
35. (Spain) Cristo Reyes (first round)
36. (England) Keegan Brown (first round)
37. (Netherlands) Benito van de Pas (first round)
38. (England) Ryan Searle (first round)
39. (Republic of Ireland) William O'Connor (third round)
40. (England) Kevin Painter (first round)
41. (England) Darren Johnson (first round)
42. (Wales) Mark Webster (first round)
43. (Northern Ireland) Brendan Dolan (first round)
44. (Netherlands) Jimmy Hendriks (first round)
45. (Belgium) Ronny Huybrechts (first round)
46. (Netherlands) Christian Kist (first round)
47. (England) James Richardson (first round)
48. (Belgium) Mike De Decker (first round)
49. (England) Peter Hudson (first round)
50. (England) Chris Dobey (third round)
51. (Netherlands) Jan Dekker (quarter-finals)
52. (Netherlands) Jelle Klaasen (second round)
53. (Netherlands) Jeffrey de Graaf (first round)
54. (Spain) Antonio Alcinas (first round)
55. (Netherlands) Ron Meulenkamp (second round)
56. (Netherlands) Raymond van Barneveld (first round)
57. (England) Jamie Caven (second round)
58. (England) Joe Murnan (first round)
59. (Australia) Paul Nicholson (first round)
60. (England) Andy Boulton (first round)
61. (Northern Ireland) Mickey Mansell (second round)
62. (England) Steve Hine (second round)
63. (Netherlands) Jeffrey de Zwaan (first round)
64. (Wales) Robert Owen (first round)

== Draw ==
There was no draw held, all players were put in a fixed bracket by their seeding positions.

=== Finals ===
Quarter-finals (best of 19 legs); 26 November
1	(England) Rob Cross 96.32	10
25	(England) James Wade 93.47	6
12	(Wales) Jonny Clayton 91.86	10
20	(England) Steve Beaton 88.69	8
2	(Northern Ireland) Daryl Gurney 91.82	9
23	(England) Justin Pipe 91.23	10
6	(Netherlands) Michael van Gerwen 105.08	10
51	(Netherlands) Jan Dekker 93.80	7

Semi-finals (best of 21 legs); 26 November
1	(England) Rob Cross 93.94	8
12	(Wales) Jonny Clayton 95.48	11
23	(England) Justin Pipe 93.75	3
6	(Netherlands) Michael van Gerwen 103.72	11

Final (best of 21 legs); 26 November
12	(Wales) Jonny Clayton 94.64	2
6	(Netherlands) Michael van Gerwen 105.50	11

=== Top half ===
==== Section 1 ====
First round (best of 11 legs); 24 November
1	(England) Rob Cross 92.18	6
64	(Wales) Robert Owen 90.52	2
32	(Republic of Ireland) Steve Lennon 89.93	6
33	(Austria) Zoran Lerchbacher 88.29	4
16	(England) Richard North 99.06	6
49	(England) Peter Hudson 83.53	1
17	(England) Adrian Lewis 98.89	6
48	(Belgium) Mike De Decker 95.30	3
8	(England) Joe Cullen 92.56	5
57	(England) Jamie Caven 85.63	6
25	(England) James Wade 89.90	6
40	(England) Kevin Painter 86.84	4
9	(England) Ian White 95.25	6
56	(Netherlands) Raymond van Barneveld 96.88	5
24	(Scotland) John Henderson 90.91	6
41	(England) Darren Johnson 83.61	2

Second round (best of 11 legs); 25 November
1	(England) Rob Cross 104.04	6
32	(Republic of Ireland) Steve Lennon 98.44	2
16	(England) Richard North 92.22	3
17	(England) Adrian Lewis 97.41	6
57	(England) Jamie Caven 81.55	4
25	(England) James Wade 79.99	6
9	(England) Ian White 102.04	6
24	(Scotland) John Henderson 98.64	5

Third round (best of 19 legs); 25 November
1	(England) Rob Cross 101.19	10
17	(England) Adrian Lewis 97.29	6
25	(England) James Wade 94.53	10
9	(England) Ian White 92.56	6

Quarter-finals (best of 19 legs); 26 November
1	(England) Rob Cross 96.32	10
25	(England) James Wade 93.47	6

==== Section 2 ====
First round (best of 11 legs); 24 November
5	(Austria) Mensur Suljović 92.02	6
60	(England) Andy Boulton 81.94	0
28	(England) Stephen Bunting 96.73	6
37	(Netherlands) Benito van de Pas 84.73	3
12	(Wales) Jonny Clayton 94.98	6
53	(Netherlands) Jeffrey de Graaf 92.87	4
21	(Wales) Gerwyn Price 91.15	6
44	(Netherlands) Jimmy Hendriks 88.82	4
4	(Scotland) Gary Anderson 84.14	3
61	(Northern Ireland) Mickey Mansell 86.28	6
29	(Netherlands) Jermaine Wattimena 96.97	6
36	(England) Keegan Brown 79.97	0
13	(England) Alan Norris 102.53	4
52	(Netherlands) Jelle Klaasen 100.83	6
20	(England) Steve Beaton 93.17	6
45	(Belgium) Ronny Huybrechts 87.86	4

Second round (best of 11 legs); 25 November
5	(Austria) Mensur Suljović 99.21	3
28	(England) Stephen Bunting 100.09	6
12	(Wales) Jonny Clayton 98.37	6
21	(Wales) Gerwyn Price 95.94	2
61	(Northern Ireland) Mickey Mansell 86.84	3
29	(Netherlands) Jermaine Wattimena 95.73	6
52	(Netherlands) Jelle Klaasen 91.08	4
20	(England) Steve Beaton 86.94	6

Third round (best of 19 legs); 25 November
28	(England) Stephen Bunting 91.85	8
12	(Wales) Jonny Clayton 90.49	10
29	(Netherlands) Jermaine Wattimena 87.13	9
20	(England) Steve Beaton 87.52	10

Quarter-finals (best of 19 legs); 26 November
12	(Wales) Jonny Clayton 91.86	10
20	(England) Steve Beaton 88.69	8

=== Bottom half ===
==== Section 3 ====
First round (best of 11 legs); 24 November
2	(Northern Ireland) Daryl Gurney 93.94	6
63	(Netherlands) Jeffrey de Zwaan 90.22	0
31	(Netherlands) Vincent van der Voort 90.44	5
34	(England) Robbie Green 89.23	6
15	(Belgium) Kim Huybrechts 88.80	3
50	(England) Chris Dobey 94.80	6
18	(Scotland) Robert Thornton 88.81	6
47	(England) James Richardson 91.26	5
7	(England) Dave Chisnall 87.53	6
58	(England) Joe Murnan 87.46	5
26	(England) James Wilson 90.65	5
39	(Republic of Ireland) William O'Connor 93.06	6
10	(Australia) Kyle Anderson 93.60	4
55	(Netherlands) Ron Meulenkamp 91.09	6
23	(England) Justin Pipe 92.66	6
42	(Wales) Mark Webster 93.24	3

Second round (best of 11 legs); 25 November
2	(Northern Ireland) Daryl Gurney 90.40	6
34	(England) Robbie Green 84.74	4
50	(England) Chris Dobey 90.66	6
18	(Scotland) Robert Thornton 92.86	5
7	(England) Dave Chisnall 88.58	3
39	(Republic of Ireland) William O'Connor 90.70	6
55	(Netherlands) Ron Meulenkamp 91.47	5
23	(England) Justin Pipe 85.74	6

Third round (best of 19 legs); 25 November
2	(Northern Ireland) Daryl Gurney 102.49	10
50	(England) Chris Dobey 92.06	5
39	(Republic of Ireland) William O'Connor 92.99	9
23	(England) Justin Pipe 93.29	10

Quarter-finals (best of 19 legs); 26 November
2	(Northern Ireland) Daryl Gurney 91.82	9
23	(England) Justin Pipe 91.23	10

==== Section 4 ====
First round (best of 11 legs); 24 November
6	(Netherlands) Michael van Gerwen 100.11	6
59	(Australia) Paul Nicholson 86.21	2
27	(England) Steve West 89.47	6
38	(England) Ryan Searle 80.17	4
11	(England) Darren Webster 92.96	6
54	(Spain) Antonio Alcinas 93.24	3
22	(England) Mervyn King 86.05	6
43	(Northern Ireland) Brendan Dolan 84.77	5
3	(Scotland) Peter Wright 95.47	5
62	(England) Steve Hine 97.10	6
30	(England) Peter Jacques 92.42	6
35	(Spain) Cristo Reyes 99.47	5
14	(England) Michael Smith 90.51	3
51	(Netherlands) Jan Dekker 97.57	6
19	(Australia) Simon Whitlock 89.76	6
46	(Netherlands) Christian Kist 79.81	3

Second round (best of 11 legs); 25 November
6	(Netherlands) Michael van Gerwen 108.28	6
27	(England) Steve West 99.44	2
11	(England) Darren Webster 103.32	6
22	(England) Mervyn King 93.10	3
62	(England) Steve Hine 82.67	5
30	(England) Peter Jacques 85.74	6
51	(Netherlands) Jan Dekker 84.07	6
19	(Australia) Simon Whitlock 81.96	5

Third round (best of 19 legs); 25 November
6	(Netherlands) Michael van Gerwen 102.68	10
11	(England) Darren Webster 91.38	5
30	(England) Peter Jacques 86.32	5
51	(Netherlands) Jan Dekker 88.94	10

Quarter-finals (best of 19 legs); 26 November
6	(Netherlands) Michael van Gerwen 105.08	10
51	(Netherlands) Jan Dekker 93.80	7
