= Peter Jacques =

English darts player (born 1973)

Personal information
- Nickname: "The Terrier"
- Born: 29 March 1973 (age 53) Huddersfield, West Yorkshire, England
- Home town: Denby Dale, West Yorkshire, England

Sport
- Sport: Darts
- Playing since: 1993
- Darts: 22g Red Dragon Dragonfly 6
- Laterality: Right-handed
- Walk-on music: "Sandstorm" by Darude

Organisation (see split in darts)
- BDO: 2007–2015
- PDC: 2015–2024 (Tour Card: 2018; 2020–2021)
- WDF: 2023–

WDF major events – best performances
- World Masters: Last 144: 2015

PDC premier events – best performances
- World Championship: Last 64: 2018
- UK Open: Last 16: 2021
- PC Finals: Last 16: 2017

Other tournament wins
- Years
PDC Challenge Tour	2017 (x2)
Modus Super Series 1 Week 11 Winner	2022

Peter Jacques (born 29 March 1973) is an English professional darts player who formerly competed in Professional Darts Corporation (PDC) events.

== Career ==
=== Early career ===
Jacques began playing darts in 1993 and competed in county darts and tournaments organised by the British Darts Organisation (BDO). He appeared at BDO events from 2007 onwards, including the World Masters, and reached the quarter-finals of the England Masters. Alongside his darts career, Jacques worked as a postman for Royal Mail.

In 2016, Jacques began competing on the Professional Darts Corporation (PDC) Challenge Tour. He entered Q-School in January 2017 and was in a promising position after the first three days, but did not participate on the final day because of a previously arranged local league match. Although he failed to secure a Tour Card, he was eligible to enter Players Championship events as an associate member.

=== 2017: Breakthrough season ===
Jacques enjoyed a breakthrough season in 2017. At the opening Players Championships event in Barnsley on 25 February, he reached the final on his Pro Tour debut before losing 6–1 to Alan Norris.

In May, Jacques claimed his first PDC ranking title by winning Challenge Tour Event 11 in Milton Keynes, defeating Wayne Jones 5–4 in the final. He won a second title at Event 17 in Wigan in September, again defeating Jones, this time 5–2. Jacques finished fourth on the 2017 Challenge Tour Order of Merit.

Jacques also qualified for several PDC European Tour events, reaching the last 16 of the 2017 International Darts Open, where he lost 6–4 to Jelle Klaasen. He qualified for the 2017 Players Championship Finals as the 30th seed and defeated Cristo Reyes and Steve Hine before losing 10–5 to Jan Dekker in the third round.

His performances earned him a debut at the 2018 PDC World Darts Championship, where he was eliminated in the first round by Kyle Anderson, losing 3–1 in sets.

Jacques, a supporter of Huddersfield Town, adopted the nickname "The Terrier", also associated with his hometown football club.

Despite entering 2017 without a PDC Tour Card, Jacques earned sufficient ranking prize money during his breakthrough season to finish inside the top 64 of the PDC Order of Merit following the 2018 PDC World Darts Championship. With £43,000 in ranking earnings, he secured a Tour Card for the 2018 season without having to qualify through Q-School.

=== 2018–2021: Tour Card and UK Open run ===
Jacques held a PDC Tour Card in 2018, but lost his professional status at the end of the season. On 9 February 2018, he hit a nine-dart finish against Marko Kantele during a UK Open Qualifier in Wigan. He achieved another nine-darter against Radek Szaganski at Challenge Tour Event 4 on 27 January 2019.

In January 2020, Jacques regained his Tour Card through the UK Q-School Order of Merit, securing a place on the professional circuit for the 2020 and 2021 seasons.

His most notable result during this period came at the 2021 UK Open. Jacques defeated Michael Rasztovits, Ciaran Teehan, Andy Boulton and Max Hopp to reach the last 16. His victory over Hopp came in a deciding leg, 10–9, before he lost 10–4 to Devon Petersen in the sixth round.

Jacques lost his Tour Card at the end of 2021 after failing to retain a place among the top 64 of the PDC Order of Merit.

=== 2022–2024: Challenge Tour and WDF events ===
After failing to regain a Tour Card at the 2022 Q-School, Jacques returned to the PDC Challenge Tour. His best result of the season was a semi-final appearance at Event 6 in Hildesheim, where he lost 5–1 to Scott Williams. He finished 47th on the Challenge Tour Order of Merit.

Jacques also competed in the MODUS Super Series in 2022. He won Week 11 in October, defeating Martin Adams 4–1 in the semi-finals and Robert Thornton 4–3 in the final, securing qualification for Champions Week.

In March 2023, Jacques reached the final of Challenge Tour Event 6 in Hildesheim. He defeated Danny Lauby 5–4 in the semi-finals before losing 5–2 to Berry van Peer in the final.

Later that year, Jacques competed on the World Darts Federation (WDF) circuit. In September, he reached the final of the British Open, where he was defeated 5–2 by Luke Littler.

Jacques attempted to regain his Tour Card at the 2024 Q-School, reaching the Final Stage but failing to qualify. He continued to compete on the Challenge Tour during 2024, with his final appearance of the season coming at Event 20 in Milton Keynes in August.

=== 2025–2026: Later career ===
Jacques remained active in WDF and other non-Tour Card competitions. In March 2025, he reached the semi-finals of the Isle of Man Classic, defeating James Beeton, Archie Self and Ryan O'Connor before losing 4–1 to Jim McEwan.

He also returned to the MODUS Super Series. In November 2025, he reached the semi-finals of Week 11 of Series 12, losing 4–3 to Scott Campbell. Jacques continued competing in the series in May 2026, participating in Week 4 of Series 14, where he recorded victories over Danny Trueman and Arne Spee during the Group C stage.

== World Championship results ==
=== PDC World Championship ===
- 2018: First round (lost to Kyle Anderson 1–3)

== Performance timeline ==
=== BDO ===
Tournament	2007	2008	2009	2010	2011	2012	2013	2014	2015
BDO Ranked televised events
World Masters	1R	Did not participate							2R

=== PDC ===
Tournament	2017	2018	2019	2020	2021
PDC Ranked televised events
World Championship	DNQ	1R	DNQ		
UK Open	DNQ			2R	6R
Players Championship Finals	3R	DNQ			
Career statistics
Year-end ranking	62	66	–	127	96

==== PDC European Tour ====
Season	1	2	3	4	5	6	7	8	9	10	11	12	13
2017	DNQ		GDO; 1R	DNQ		EDM; 2R	DNQ	EDO; 2R	DNQ		IDO; 3R	DNQ	
2018	Did not qualify							DDO; 2R	Did not qualify				
2020	DNQ												
2021	DNQ												

==== PDC Players Championships ====
Season	1	2	3	4	5	6	7	8	9	10	11	12	13	14	15	16	17	18	19	20	21	22	23	24	25	26	27	28	29	30	31	32	33	34
2017 (Note: Not a Tour card holder)	BAR; F	BAR; 2R	BAR; DNP		MIL; 4R	MIL; 1R	BAR; 1R	BAR; 1R	WIG; 3R	WIG; 2R	MIL; 2R	MIL; 3R	WIG; 1R	WIG; 3R	BAR; 1R	BAR; 2R	BAR; 3R	BAR; 1R	DUB; 1R	DUB; 1R	BAR; 4R	BAR; 3R												
2018	BAR; 2R	BAR; 1R	BAR; 1R	BAR; 1R	MIL; 2R	MIL; 2R	BAR; 1R	BAR; 1R	WIG; 1R	WIG; 2R	MIL; 2R	MIL; 1R	WIG; QF	WIG; 1R	BAR; 2R	BAR; 1R	BAR; 1R	BAR; 1R	DUB; 2R	DUB; 2R	BAR; 2R	BAR; 1R												
2020	BAR; 1R	BAR; 2R	WIG; 2R	WIG; 1R	WIG; 1R	WIG; 3R	BAR; 1R	BAR; 1R	MIL; 1R	MIL; 1R	MIL; 2R	MIL; 1R	MIL; 3R	NIE; 1R	NIE; 2R	NIE; 1R	NIE; 1R	NIE; 3R	COV; 1R	COV; 2R	COV; 1R	COV; 1R	COV; 3R											
2021	BOL; 1R	BOL; 1R	BOL; 2R	BOL; 2R	MIL; 1R	MIL; 2R	MIL; 1R	MIL; 1R	NIE; 3R	NIE; 1R	NIE; 1R	NIE; 3R	MIL; 2R	MIL; 1R	MIL; 1R	MIL; 1R	COV; 1R	COV; 1R	COV; 1R	COV; 1R	BAR; 1R	BAR; 2R	BAR; 1R	BAR; 2R	BAR; 3R	BAR; 1R	BAR; 1R	BAR; 3R	BAR; 2R	BAR; 1R				
2022	Did not participate																				BAR; 1R	Did not participate												
2023	Did not participate											LEI; 1R	Did not participate											BAR; 2R	BAR; DNP			BAR; 1R	BAR; DNP					

==== PDC Challenge Tour ====
Season	1	2	3	4	5	6	7	8	9	10	11	12	13	14	15	16	17	18	19	20	21	22	23	24	Prize money	Ranking
2016	DNP		WIG; L128	WIG; L128	WIG; L32	WIG; L64	WIG; L256	WIG; L128	Did not participate																£150	146th
2017	DNP		MIL; QF	MIL; L64	BAR; L32	BAR; QF	BAR; L32	BAR; L64	DNP		MIL; W	MIL; QF	Did not participate				WIG; W	WIG; L64	WIG; L16	WIG; L32					£5,550	4th
2019	WIG; L256	WIG; L128	WIG; L128	WIG; L32	WIG; L64	WIG; L16	WIG; L128	WIG; L128	PET; L128	PET; L128	PET; L32	PET; L128	WOL; L128	WOL; L128	WOL; L64	WOL; L128	WIG; L128	WIG; L128	WIG; L32	WIG; L128					£600	93rd
2022	MIL; L128	MIL; L256	MIL; L128	MIL; L256	MIL; L128	HIL; SF	HIL; L256	HIL; L32	HIL; L16	HIL; L32	HIL; L32	HIL; L128	DNP		HIL; L128	LEI; L32	LEI; L128	LEI; L32	LEI; L128	LEI; L64	LEI; L128	LEI; L64	LEI; L16	LEI; L256	£1,500	47th
2023	MIL; L256	MIL; L128	MIL; L128	MIL; L256	MIL; L16	HIL; F	HIL; L128	HIL; L32	HIL; L128	MIL; L16	MIL; L64	MIL; L64	MIL; L256	MIL; L32	MIL; L64	MIL; L16	MIL; L32	MIL; L256	MIL; L64	WIG; L128	WIG; L32	WIG; L16	WIG; L128	WIG; QF	£3,800	23rd
2024	MIL; L64	MIL; L256	MIL; L64	MIL; L32	MIL; L256	HIL; L32	HIL; L16	HIL; L128	HIL; L256	HIL; L64	LEI; L64	LEI; L128	LEI; L128	LEI; L128	DNP	MIL; L128	MIL; L256	MIL; L16	MIL; L64	MIL; L128	Did not participate				£1,375	74th
