= Rhys Mathewson =

New Zealand comedian

- Born: Rhys Alexander Mathewson; 1990 or 1991 (age 35–36); Palmerston North, New Zealand
- Occupation: Comedian
- Awards: Billy T Award (2010); Fred Award (2016)

Comedy career
- Years active: 2009–present
- Medium: Stand-up; television

Rhys Mathewson is a New Zealand comedian, writer, and actor. He won the Billy T Award in 2010 and the Fred Award in 2016.

== Early life ==
Mathewson was born in Palmerston North, New Zealand. He has a brother. He studied tap dance from the age of 5 until 15 and attended Westlake Boys High School. While a teenager, he participated in the New Zealand International Comedy Festival's Class Comedians program and decided to pursue comedy as a career.

After winning the Billy T Award in 2010, Mathewson dropped out of the University of Auckland (but continued to write a column, "Rhys's Pieces", for the student magazine Craccum).

== Career ==
Mathewson was awarded Best Newcomer at the New Zealand International Comedy Festival for his first solo show in 2009, The Best $18 You'll Ever Spend. He performed at Edinburgh Fringe in 2009 and 2013.

Mathewson won the Billy T Award in 2010 for his show Rhyspect — becoming the award's youngest-ever winner at 19 — and the Fred Award in 2016 for Nouveau Rhys.

Mathewson has acted on the programmes Wanna-Ben, Hounds, The Fucket List, and New Zealand Spy, and appeared as himself on 7 Days, AotearoHa, Have You Been Paying Attention?, Guy Montgomery's Guy Mont-Spelling Bee, Best Bits, Campbell Live, Seven Sharp, Close Up, and The Jono Project. He competed on series 9 of Dancing with the Stars in 2022, partnered with Phoebe Robb; they were forced to leave the competition early due to a COVID-19 infection.

He was also a fill-in host on and wrote for The Project, and is a writer on Guy Montgomery's Guy Mont-Spelling Bee. In 2026, Mathewson appeared on series 7 of Taskmaster New Zealand.

As of 2026 he is represented by Gail Cowan Management.

=== Stand-up shows ===
- The Best $18 You'll Ever Spend (2009)
- Rhyspect (2010)
- Rhys Mathewson Is Fun (2011)
- Rhys Mathewson Versus The World (2012)
- Hombre Lobo (2014)
- Nouveau Rhys (2016)
- Rhys Classic (2017)
- The Future Quiz (2017)
- The Clumsy Tango (2018)
- Heartless Joke Machine (2021)
- The Mathewson & Matthewson Comedy Night (2022; with Eli Matthewson)
- Heating Up (2023)
- 10th Rodeo (2024)
- Surblibor (2024)
- Time Trial (2025)
- Big Mistake (2026)

== Personal life ==
Mathewson lived in the United Kingdom in 2014. He is vegetarian.

After years of dating, Mathewson married Chelsea McEwan-Millar — actor, writer, and managing director of skincare company Go Native New Zealand — in 2022 outside of Tauranga. They live in the Grey Lynn–Ponsonby area of Auckland with their dog, Gus.
