= Bernie Smith (darts player) =

New Zealand darts player (born 1964)

Personal information
- Full name: Bernard Smith
- Born: 31 January 1964 (age 62) Christchurch, New Zealand
- Home town: Auckland, New Zealand

Sport
- Sport: Darts
- Playing since: 1980
- Darts: Puma Signature 18g Steel Tip
- Laterality: Right-handed
- Walk-on music: "Slice of Heaven" by Dave Dobbyn with Herbs

Organisation (see split in darts)
- BDO: 2003–2018
- PDC: 2018–

PDC premier events – best performances
- World Championship: Last 64: 2018

Other tournament wins
- Years
Canterbury Open	2008, 2012, 2017
Canterbury Classic	2014
New Zealand Masters	2008
New Zealand Ch'ship	2008, 2009, 2018
Oceanic Masters	2017
South Island Masters	2008, 2015, 2016, 2017
Medal record
Men's Darts
Representing New Zealand
WDF Asia-Pacific Cup
Gold medal – first place	2004 Singapore	Team event
Silver medal – second place	2008 Palmerston	Team event
Bronze medal – third place	2004 Singapore	Men's pairs
Bronze medal – third place	2006 Kuala Lumpur	Men's singles
Bronze medal – third place	2006 Kuala Lumpur	Men's pairs
Bronze medal – third place	2006 Kuala Lumpur	Team event
Bronze medal – third place	2010 Tokyo	Team event

Bernard Smith (born 31 January 1964) is a New Zealand professional darts player who plays in events of the Professional Darts Corporation (PDC). He qualified for his debut appearance at the 2018 PDC World Championships by winning the 2017 Oceanic Masters in Dubbo, Australia in October 2017.

== World Championship results ==
=== PDC ===
- 2018: First round (lost to Justin Pipe 2–3)

== Performance timeline ==
PDC

Tournament	2018
PDC World Championship	1R
