= Jim Brown (darts player) =

Scottish darts player

Personal information
- Nickname: "Jimmy"
- Born: 14 February 1971 (age 55) Burnbank, Scotland
- Home town: Burnbank, Scotland

Sport
- Sport: Darts
- Playing since: 2011
- Darts: 24g
- Laterality: Right-handed

Organisation (see split in darts)
- PDC: 2013–2018

Jim Brown (born 14 February 1971) is a Scottish former professional darts player who played in Professional Darts Corporation (PDC) events.

He earned a PDC Tour Card in 2017.
