= Kenny Neyens =

Belgian darts player (born 1995)

Personal information
- Nickname: "The Believer"
- Born: 13 January 1995 (age 31) Borgerhout, Antwerp, Belgium
- Home town: Borgerhout, Antwerp, Belgium

Sport
- Sport: Darts
- Darts: 23.6g Own design
- Laterality: Right-handed
- Walk-on music: "Uptown Funk" by Mark Ronson featuring Bruno Mars

Organisation (see split in darts)
- BDO: 2012–2015
- PDC: 2015–

WDF major events – best performances
- World Masters: Last 80: 2015

PDC premier events – best performances
- World Championship: Last 72: 2018
- UK Open: Last 96: 2022

Other tournament wins
- Years
PDC Development Tour	2016, 2017
PDC Challenge Tour	2021, 2022
PDC ET02 Associate Member Qualifier	2021

Kenny Neyens (born 13 January 1995) is a Belgian darts player playing in Professional Darts Corporation (PDC) events.

== Career ==
Neyens has won two titles on the PDC Development Tour, one in Mülheim in 2016 and one in Wigan in 2017. He also participated in the 2017 PDC World Youth Championship, where he reached the quarter-finals, before losing to eventual runner-up Josh Payne 6–0.

He then qualified for the 2018 PDC World Darts Championship by winning the Central European qualifier against fellow Belgian Davyd Venken 6–4. He played Jamie Lewis of Wales in the preliminary round, and despite taking the first set, he would eventually lose the next two, to be knocked out of the tournament.

== World Championship results ==
=== PDC ===
- 2018: Preliminary round (lost to Jamie Lewis 1–2)
