= BDO 9-Dart Club =

Winmau BDO 9-Dart Club
- Established: January 2013
- Founder: BDO / Winmau
- Members: Men's Singles (5 members); Mixed Pairs (1 team, 2 members); Total (7 inductees)

The BDO 9-Dart Club (officially the Winmau BDO 9-Dart Club) was an initiative launched and partnered by the British Darts Organisation and long-term sponsor Winmau in January 2013, which celebrated the 40th anniversary of the British Darts Organisation, with membership restricted to darts players that achieved a nine-dart finish at BDO / WDF major and open events.

Players that achieved this feat were presented with a unique set of laser-etched tungsten darts in a laser-etched aluminium presentation case as a permanent keepsake from Winmau. There was no specified limit as to how many times a player or team could be inducted if they achieved a nine-dart finish at BDO / WDF major and open events.

== Tournaments ==
The following list of tournaments qualified players for admittance into the BDO 9-Dart Club if they achieved a nine-dart finish;

- BDO World Darts Championship
- Winmau World Masters
- BDO World Trophy^{1}
- BDO British Classic
- BDO British Open
- BDO Gold Cup
- BDO International Open
- Scottish Open (SDA)
- Scottish Masters (SDA)^{2}
- Welsh Open (WDO)
- Welsh Classic (WDO)
- EDO England Open^{3}
- EDO England Matchplay^{4}
- Zuiderduin Masters (NDB)
- Dutch Open (NDB)
- Six Nations Cup
- BDO British Internationals

^{1}Wasn't on the original list of qualifying tournaments as the event was announced towards end of 2013.
^{2}Wasn't on the original list of qualifying tournaments, only included after Gary Stone achieved a nine-dart finish at the Scottish Masters in June 2013.
^{3 and 4}Weren't on the original list of qualifying tournaments, but both the EDO England Open and the EDO England Matchplay were later added to the list.

== Inductees ==
The first player to be inaugurated into the BDO 9-Dart Club was John Walton that January. He became the first player to achieve a nine-dart finish at the World Masters in 2007. Glen Durrant and Claire Stainsby became the first mixed pairs team inaugurated into the BDO 9-Dart Club after making history by achieving the first ever nine-dart finish in mixed pairs competition at the BDO International Open in 2013.

Glen Durrant became the first member to be inaugurated twice in the same season after achieving a nine-dart finish at the EDO England Open in 2013 also. Only after Gary Stone achieved a nine-dart finish at the Scottish Masters in 2013 was the event added to the list of qualifying tournaments, with Gary Stone also being inaugurated into the BDO 9-Dart Club.

Player(s)	Event	Year	Tournament	Route	Ref
(England) John Walton	Men's Singles	2007	World Masters	3 x T20; 3 x T20; T20, T19, D12	
(England) Christian Pratt	Men's Singles	2012	BDO British Classic		
(England) Glen Durrant (England) Claire Stainsby	Mixed Pairs	2013	BDO International Open	2 x T20, T19; 3 x T20; ?, ?, and ?	
(Scotland) Gary Stone	Men's Singles	2013	Scottish Masters		
(England) Glen Durrant	Men's Singles	2013	EDO England Open		
(England) Andy Beardmore	Men's Singles	2013	BDO British Classic		
