= Rhys Griffin =

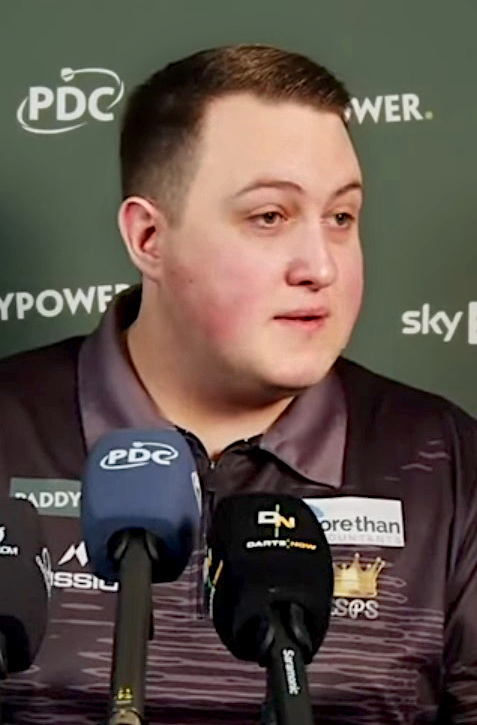
- Griffin at the 2025 PDC World Darts Championship

Personal information
- Nickname: Happy Gilmore
- Born: 18 January 1997 (age 29) Llanbradach, Wales

Sport
- Sport: Darts
- Playing since: 2009
- Darts: 23g Mission
- Laterality: Right-handed
- Walk-on music: "Rest of My Life" by Ludacris featuring Usher and David Guetta

Organisation (see split in darts)
- PDC: 2012–present (Tour Card: 2024–present)
- WDF: 2011–2020
- Current world ranking: (PDC) 123 ▼1 (29 October 2026)

WDF major events – best performances
- World Masters: Last 48: 2016
- Dutch Open: Semi-final: 2017

PDC premier events – best performances
- World Championship: Last 64: 2025
- UK Open: Last 96: 2021
- World Series Finals: Last 32: 2024

Other tournament wins
- Years
BDO International Open Youth	2014
British Internationals Boys	2012
Medal record
Men's Darts
Representing Wales
WDF Europe Cup Youth
Silver medal – second place	2014 Vienna	Boys singles

Rhys Griffin (born 18 January 1997) is a Welsh professional darts player who competes in Professional Darts Corporation (PDC) events.

== Career ==
In 2012, Griffin made his debut on the PDC Youth Tour, with his best performance being reaching the last 16. He qualified for the 2014 UK Open at 17 years of age, but lost to Paul Withworth 5–0 in the first round. He reached his first Development Tour final in 2015 and qualified for the 2015 PDC World Youth Championship.

He reached the semi-finals of the 2017 Dutch Open.

He reached the final of 2017 Development Tour 13 but lost to Dimitri Van den Bergh 5–4.

He made his Players Championship debut in 2018 as a call-up from the Challenge Tour. He reached the last 16 at event four with wins against Joe Cullen, Kim Huybrechts and Nathan Aspinall respectively.

He continued to play on the Development Tour and PDC Challenge Tour in the following two years. He qualified for the 2021 UK Open, reaching the third round with a victory over Mike De Decker.

In January 2024, Griffin won a PDC Tour Card for the first time at Q-School. He qualified for the 2024 World Series of Darts Finals but lost to Jeff Smith 6–4 in the opening round.

On 25 November 2024, Griffin qualified for the 2025 PDC World Darts Championship via the Tour Card Holder Qualifier. He defeated Karel Sedláček 3–0 in sets the first round before losing to Josh Rock in the second round.

Griffin entered the 2025 UK Open in the second round, where he lost to Beau Greaves.

== Performance timeline ==
Griffin's performance timeline is as follows:

=== BDO ===
Tournament	2016	2017
BDO Ranked televised events
World Masters	4R	3R

=== PDC ===
Tournament	2014	2021	2024	2025
PDC Ranked televised events
World Championship	DNQ			2R
World Masters	DNQ			Prel.
UK Open	1R	3R	2R	2R
PDC Non-ranked televised events
World Series of Darts Finals	DNQ		1R	DNQ

==== PDC European Tour ====
Tournament	2026
European Darts Open	1R

==== PDC Players Championships ====
Season	1	2	3	4	5	6	7	8	9	10	11	12	13	14	15	16	17	18	19	20	21	22	23	24	25	26	27	28	29	30	31	32	33	34
2018	BAR; DNP	BAR; 1R	BAR; DNP	BAR; 4R	Did not participate													BAR; 1R	Did not participate															
2024	WIG; 1R	WIG; 3R	LEI; 1R	LEI; 2R	HIL; 1R	HIL; 1R	LEI; 1R	LEI; 2R	HIL; 1R	HIL; 1R	HIL; 1R	HIL; 2R	MIL; 3R	MIL; 1R	MIL; 4R	MIL; 1R	MIL; 3R	MIL; 1R	MIL; 1R	WIG; 1R	WIG; 2R	LEI; 1R	LEI; 1R	WIG; 1R	WIG; 1R	WIG; 2R	WIG; 1R	WIG; 1R	LEI; 1R	LEI; 1R				
2025	WIG; 1R	WIG; 1R	ROS; 2R	ROS; 2R	LEI; 1R	LEI; 1R	HIL; 1R	HIL; 2R	LEI; 1R	LEI; 1R	LEI; 1R	LEI; 2R	ROS; 1R	ROS; 1R	HIL; 1R	HIL; 2R	LEI; 1R	LEI; 2R	LEI; 1R	LEI; 1R	LEI; 1R	HIL; 2R	HIL; 1R	MIL; 2R	MIL; 1R	HIL; 2R	HIL; 1R	LEI; 1R	LEI; 1R	LEI; 1R	WIG; 2R	WIG; QF	WIG; 1R	WIG; 2R
2026	HIL; 2R	HIL; 1R	WIG; 1R	WIG; 2R	LEI; 1R	LEI; 2R	LEI; 2R	LEI; 1R	WIG; 2R	WIG; 1R	MIL; 1R	MIL; 1R	HIL; 1R	HIL; 1R	LEI; 2R	LEI; 2R	LEI; 1R	LEI; 1R	MIL; 1R	MIL; 1R	WIG; 1R	WIG; 2R	LEI; 2R	LEI; 2R	HIL; 2R	HIL; 1R	LEI; 1R	LEI; 1R	ROS; 2R	ROS; 1R	ROS; 1R	ROS; 1R	LEI; 1R	LEI; 1R
