= 2009 Dutch Open (darts) =

The 2009 Dutch Open was the 37th edition of the Dutch Open.

Darryl Fitton won the tournament, defeating Willy van de Wiel 3–2 in sets in the final.

== Draw ==
Round 2
(England)	Scott Waites	3
(Netherlands)	Dennis Klamer	0
(Netherlands)	Daniel Hoogstra	0
(England)	John Walton	3
(England)	Martin Atkins	2
(Belgium)	Dirk Hespeels	3
(Netherlands)	Koen Monsieurs	2
(England)	Tony O'Shea	3
(Netherlands)	Peter van der Veer	0
(Netherlands)	Michael Thole	3
(Netherlands)	Jan Martens	2
(England)	Darryl Fitton	3
(England)	Mark Elliot	0
(England)	Dave Prins	3
(Netherlands)	Arjan Brussaard	0
(Sweden)	Magnus Caris	3
(England)	Brian Woods	3
(Netherlands)	Jan Dekker	0
(Netherlands)	Willem Verbakel	2
(Netherlands)	Davy Verkooijen	3
(Denmark)	Preben Krabben	0
(England)	Paul Hogan	3
(Netherlands)	Henri Klein	1
(England)	Brian Derbyshire	3
(Netherlands)	Dennis te Kloese	3
(Netherlands)	Joey ten Berge	2
(Netherlands)	Dick van Dijk	3
(Netherlands)	Edwin Max	0
(England)	Dean Winstanley	0
(Netherlands)	Willy van de Wiel	3
(Netherlands)	Vincent van der Meer	1
(England)	Tony West	3

Round 3
(England)	Scott Waites	1
(England)	John Walton	3
(Belgium)	Dirk Hespeels	1
(England)	Tony O'Shea	3
(Netherlands)	Michael Thole	0
(England)	Darryl Fitton	3
(England)	Dave Prins	0
(Sweden)	Magnus Caris	3
(England)	Brian Woods	3
(Netherlands)	Davy Verkooijen	1
(England)	Paul Hogan	3
(England)	Brian Derbyshire	1
(Netherlands)	Dennis te Kloese	3
(Netherlands)	Dick van Dijk	1
(Netherlands)	Willy van de Wiel	3
(England)	Tony West	0

Quarter-finals
(England)	John Walton (74.85)	1
(England)	Tony O'Shea (83.64)	4
(England)	Darryl Fitton (88.35)	4
(Sweden)	Magnus Caris (88.77)	3
(England)	Brian Woods (88.83)	4
(England)	Paul Hogan (93.00)	3
(Netherlands)	Dennis te Kloese (77.43)	2
(Netherlands)	Willy van de Wiel (82.35)	4

Semi-finals
(England)	Tony O'Shea (91.38)	1
(England)	Darryl Fitton (94.95)	2
(England)	Brian Woods (79.65)	0
(Netherlands)	Willy van de Wiel (89.28)	2

Final
(England)	Darryl Fitton (91.17)	3
(Netherlands)	Willy van de Wiel (88.05)	2
