= 2026 European Darts Open =

2026 Elten Safety Shoes European Darts Open

Tournament information
- Dates: 10–12 July 2026
- Venue: Ostermann-Arena
- Location: Leverkusen, Germany
- Organisation(s): Professional Darts Corporation (PDC)
- Format: Legs
- Prize fund: £230,000
- Winner's share: £35,000
- High checkout: 170; Wessel Nijman; Krzysztof Ratajski

Champion(s)
- Krzysztof Ratajski (POL)

The 2026 European Darts Open (known for sponsorship reasons as the 2026 Elten Safety Shoes European Darts Open) was a professional darts tournament that took place at the Ostermann-Arena in Leverkusen, Germany, from 10 to 12 July 2026. It was the tenth of fifteen PDC European Tour events on the 2026 PDC Pro Tour. It featured a field of 48 players and £230,000 in prize money, with £35,000 going to the winner.

Nathan Aspinall was the defending champion, having defeated Damon Heta 8–6 in the 2025 final, but he lost 6–4 to Krzysztof Ratajski in the quarter-finals.

Ratajski won his third European Tour title by defeating Jermaine Wattimena 8–6 in the final.

== Prize money ==
As part of a mass boost in prize money for Professional Darts Corporation (PDC) events in 2026, the prize fund for all 2026 European Tour events rose to £230,000, of which the winner will receive £35,000.

Stage (num. of players)		Prize money
Winner	(1)	£35,000
Runner-up	(1)	£15,000
Semi-finalists	(2)	£10,000
Quarter-finalists	(4)	£8,000
Third round losers	(8)	£5,000
Second round losers	(16)	£3,500*
First round losers	(16)	£2,000*
Total	£230,000	

- Pre-qualified players from the Orders of Merit who lose in their first match of the event shall not be credited with prize money on any Order of Merit.

== Qualification and format ==
The top 16 players on the two-year PDC Order of Merit were seeded and entered the tournament in the second round, while the next 16 highest-ranked players from the one-year PDC Pro Tour Order of Merit automatically qualified for the first round. The seedings were confirmed on 13 May. The remaining 16 places went to players from four qualifying events – 10 from the Tour Card Holder Qualifier (held on 20 May), four from the Host Nation Qualifier (held on 17 May), one from the Nordic & Baltic Associate Member Qualifier (held on 15 May), and one from the East European Associate Member Qualifier (held on 4 July).

Gary Anderson, Ryan Searle, and Gerwyn Price withdrew and were replaced by Robert Owen, Max Hopp, and Dominik Grüllich. Luke Woodhouse, Damon Heta, and Krzysztof Ratajski moved up to become the 14th, 15th, and 16th seeds, respectively.

Seeded players

1. Gian van Veen (NED) (third round)
2. Michael van Gerwen (NED) (third round)
3. Jonny Clayton (WAL) (third round)
4. James Wade (ENG) (quarter-finals)
5. Danny Noppert (NED) (second round)
6. Stephen Bunting (ENG) (second round)
7. Chris Dobey (ENG) (second round)
8. Nathan Aspinall (ENG) (quarter-finals)
9. Ross Smith (ENG) (third round)
10. Wessel Nijman (NED) (third round)
11. Jermaine Wattimena (NED) (runner-up)
12. Martin Schindler (GER) (second round)
13. Mike De Decker (BEL) (second round)
14. Luke Woodhouse (ENG) (quarter-finals)
15. Damon Heta (AUS) (semi-finals)
16. Krzysztof Ratajski (POL) (champion)

PDC Pro Tour Order of Merit qualifiers
- Kevin Doets (NED) (third round)
- Niko Springer (GER) (second round)
- Dirk van Duijvenbode (NED) (quarter-finals)
- Niels Zonneveld (NED) (second round)
- Daryl Gurney (NIR) (first round)
- William O'Connor (IRL) (first round)
- Andrew Gilding (ENG) (first round)
- Joe Cullen (ENG) (second round)
- Cameron Menzies (SCO) (first round)
- Ryan Joyce (ENG) (third round)
- Karel Sedláček (CZE) (second round)
- Rob Cross (ENG) (first round)
- Kim Huybrechts (BEL) (second round)

Tour Card qualifier
- Mario Vandenbogaerde (BEL) (first round)
- Sebastian Białecki (POL) (semi-finals)
- Bradley Brooks (ENG) (second round)
- Rhys Griffin (WAL) (first round)
- Darius Labanauskas (LIT) (first round)
- Samuel Price (ENG) (first round)
- Lukas Wenig (GER) (first round)
- Maik Kuivenhoven (NED) (second round)
- Charlie Manby (ENG) (first round)
- Mickey Mansell (IRL) (second round)
Host Nation qualifier
- Jaimy Van de Weerd (GER) (first round)
- Dragutin Horvat (GER) (second round)
- Daniel Klose (GER) (first round)
- Jan Schmidt (GER) (third round)
Nordic & Baltic qualifier
- Mio Varila (FIN) (first round)
East European qualifier
- Michal Šmejda (CZE) (first round)
Reserve list
- Robert Owen (WAL) (second round)
- Max Hopp (GER) (second round)
- Dominik Grüllich (GER) (first round)

== Summary ==
=== First round ===
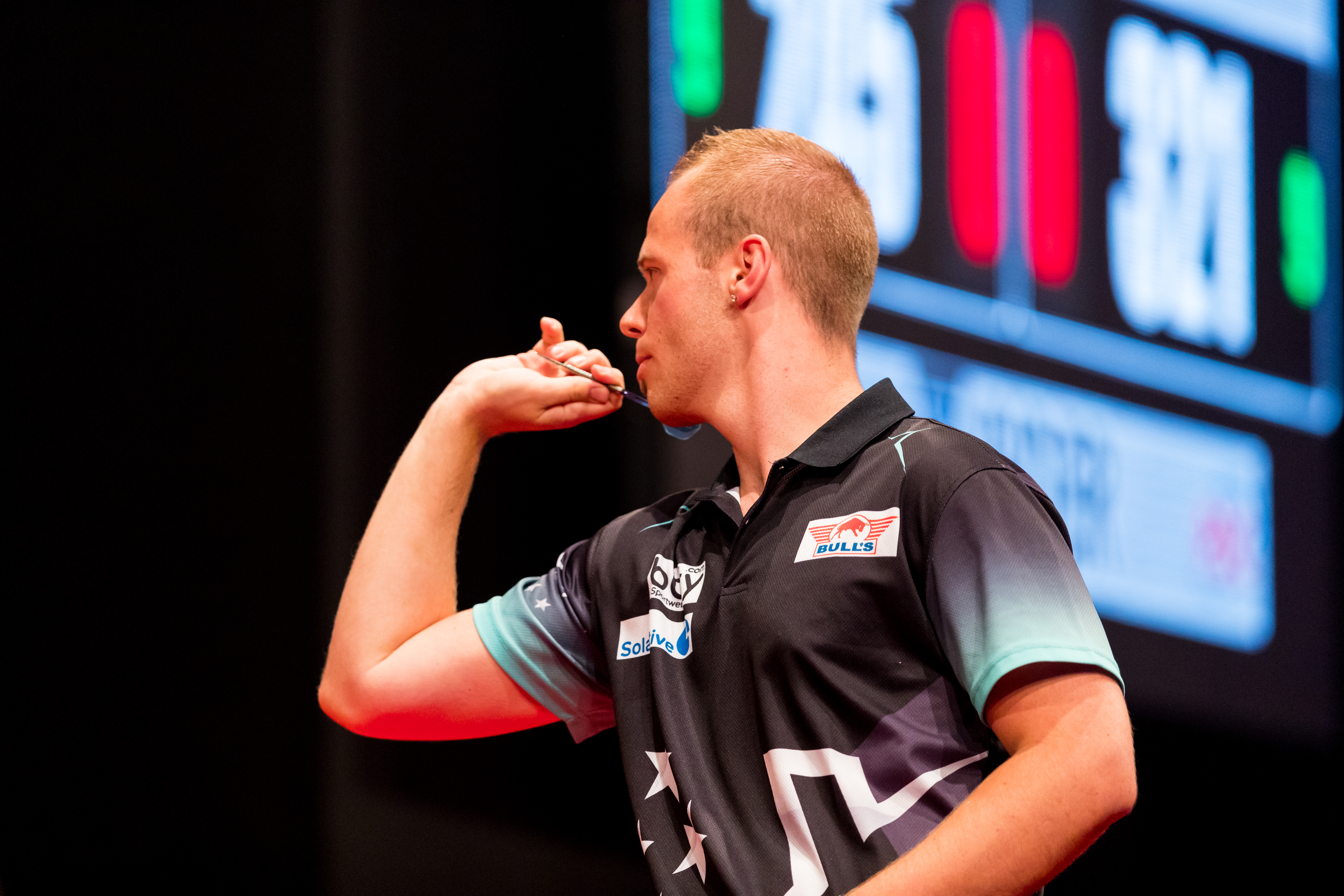
Max Hopp (pictured in 2019) defeated 2018 world champion Rob Cross in the first round.

The first round (best of 11 legs) was played on 10 July. Host nation qualifier Jan Schmidt produced a comeback from 5–1 down to defeat Cameron Menzies in a deciding leg. "I really came here believing that I’m capable of winning on the European Tour, and I took this belief on to the stage," Schmidt said afterwards. Fellow German qualifier Dragutin Horvat achieved his first win on the European Tour since 2023 by beating Mario Vandenbogaerde 6–2. The two other host nation qualifiers, Jaimy Van de Weerd and Daniel Klose, lost their respective matches to Dirk van Duijvenbode and Niels Zonneveld. Aside from the host nation qualifiers, two other German players were victorious in the first round; Niko Springer registered a three-dart average of 105.21 in a 6–2 win over Darius Labanauskas, and Max Hopp earned a 6–3 victory against 2018 world champion Rob Cross. Sebastian Białecki and Karel Sedláček both survived four match darts from their opponents, winning deciding legs against William O'Connor and European Tour debutant Rhys Griffin, respectively.

Joe Cullen took a 5–1 lead before eventually winning 6–4 against Charlie Manby, who converted four ton-plus checkouts in defeat. Kevin Doets overturned a 3–1 deficit to defeat Dominik Grüllich 6–4. Robert Owen missed double 12 for a nine-dart finish in his match against Andrew Gilding, but the Welshman recovered to claim a 6–5 victory, hitting eight maximums in the process. Mickey Mansell defeated Czech qualifier Michal Šmejda 6–1, while Ryan Joyce beat Finnish qualifier Mio Varila by the same scoreline. Samuel Price, another European Tour debutant, was beaten 6–1 by Kim Huybrechts. Maik Kuivenhoven was a 6–3 winner against Daryl Gurney, while Bradley Brooks defeated Lukas Wenig 6–2.

=== Second round ===
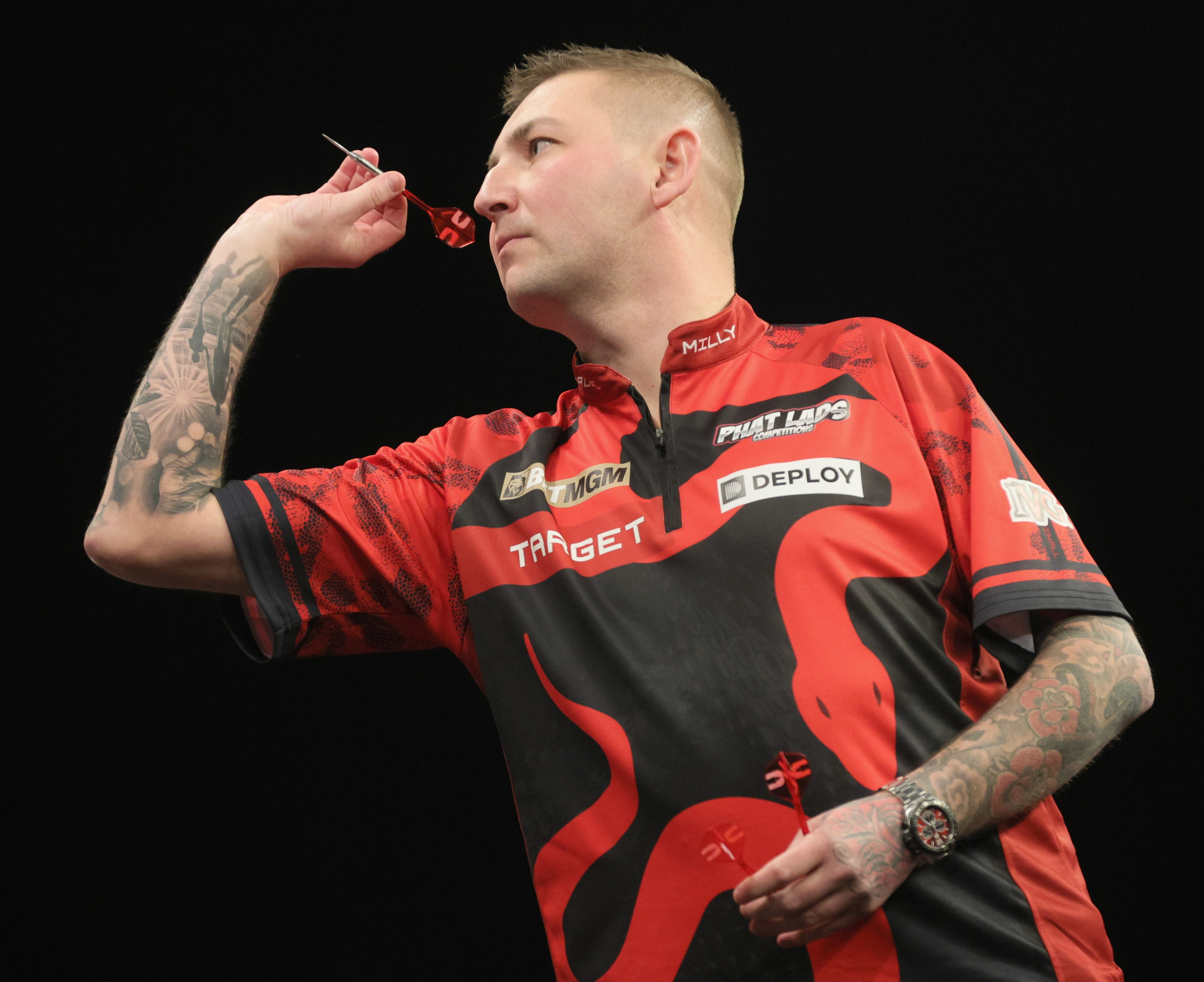
Defending champion Nathan Aspinall (pictured in 2025) reached the quarter-finals, where he was eliminated by Krzysztof Ratajski.

The second round (best of 11 legs) was played on 11 July. Defending champion Nathan Aspinall was victorious in his opening match, defeating Mickey Mansell 6–1 with an average of 107.23. In his post-match interview, Aspinall stated that Mansell played well but the thought of watching the England match later in the night made him feel relaxed. Jan Schmidt continued his run with another upset victory, beating thirteenth seed Mike De Decker in his second last-leg decider. Top seed Gian van Veen won 6–3 against Niko Springer in a match where both players averaged over 100. Three-time world champion Michael van Gerwen defeated Joe Cullen 6–2, while sixth seed Stephen Bunting lost 6–4 to Ryan Joyce. Poland's Krzysztof Ratajski and Sebastian Białecki both advanced to the third round with victories against Max Hopp and fifth seed Danny Noppert, respectively.

Dragutin Horvat was unable to join fellow host nation qualifier Schmidt in the last 16 as he lost 6–0 to Luke Woodhouse. Dutch compatriots Wessel Nijman and Jermaine Wattimena also achieved whitewashes in their respective wins against Bradley Brooks and Kim Huybrechts, with Nijman hitting a 170 checkout during his match. Kevin Doets eliminated German number one and twelfth seed Martin Schindler in a 6–3 defeat, leaving Schmidt as the only German player left in the tournament. Ross Smith was a 6–1 winner against Niels Zonneveld, while Jonny Clayton defeated Karel Sedláček by the same scoreline. Dirk van Duijvenbode beat seventh seed Chris Dobey 6–2, James Wade defeated Maik Kuivenhoven 6–4, and Damon Heta earned his own 6–4 win against Robert Owen.

=== Final day ===
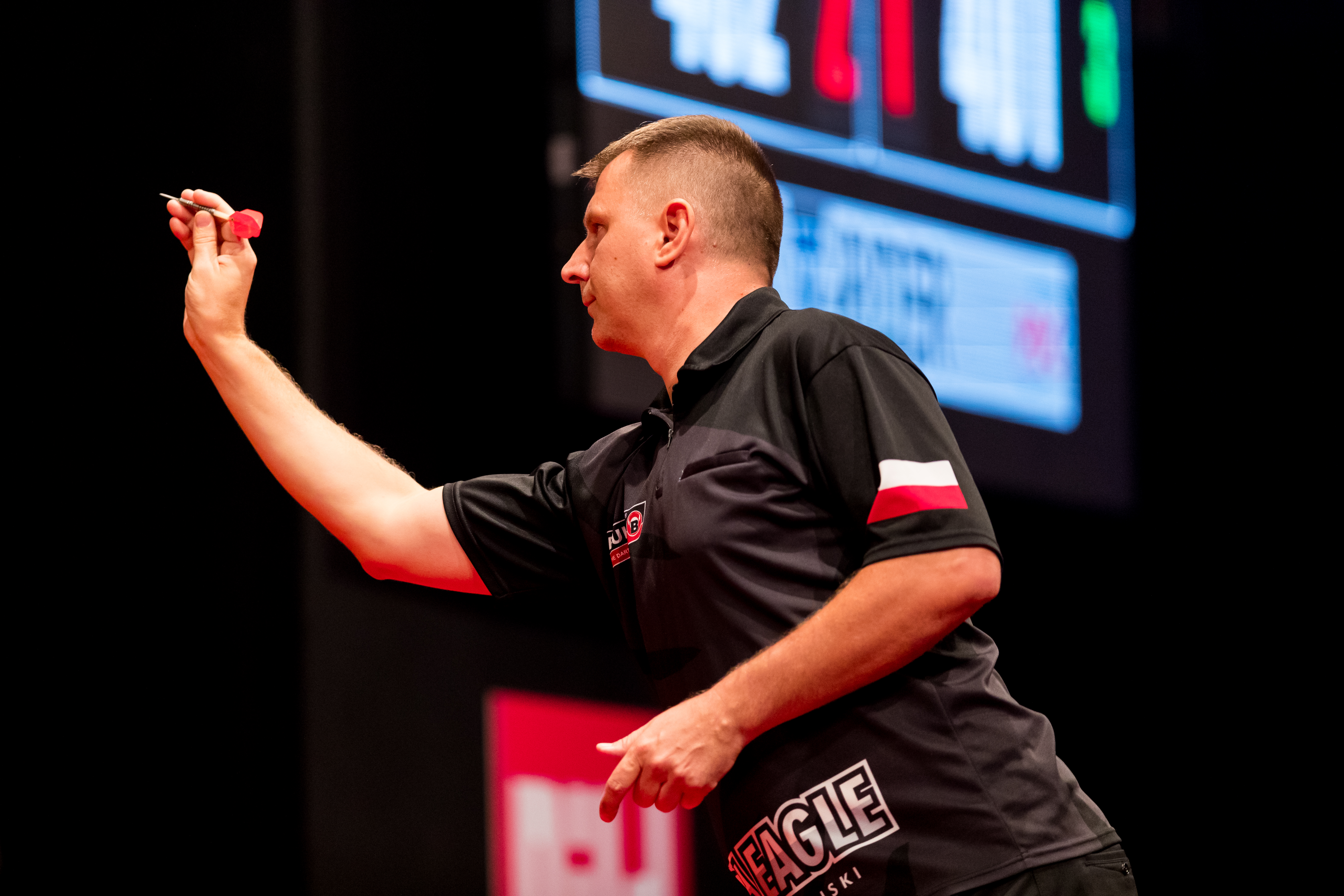
Krzysztof Ratajski (pictured in 2019) won his third European Tour title in his third final.

The third round, quarter-finals, semi-finals and final were played on 12 July. The third round and quarter-finals were contested over the best of 11 legs, the semi-finals over the best of 13 legs, and the final over the best of 15 legs. The final day saw Krzysztof Ratajski and Jermaine Wattimena reach the final. Ratajski began his day by eliminating top seed Gian van Veen, defeating the Dutchman 6–3. He followed that win by beating defending champion Nathan Aspinall 6–4 in the quarter-finals. In the European Tour's first all-Polish semi-final, he defeated first-time semi-finalist Sebastian Białecki 7–5 to advance to the final, hitting a 170 checkout en route. Wattimena defeated Ryan Joyce 6–1 before a 6–5 victory over Luke Woodhouse sent him through to his first European Tour semi-final. He proceeded to go one step further, beating Damon Heta 7–3 to progress to the title decider. Ratajski was aiming to maintain his perfect record in European Tour finals, while Wattimena was looking to win his first European Tour title.

Ratajski got off to a good start in the final, taking an early 4–1 lead. Wattimena responded by winning the next five legs, converting an 84 checkout to level the match and claiming the next leg to extend his advantage to 6–4. Missed doubles from Wattimena allowed Ratajski to level at 6–6. He hit a 68 finish to go 7–6 ahead, then completed an 8–6 victory by pinning double 10 in the 14th leg. Ratajski finished the final with a three-dart average of 92.43, while Wattimena averaged 86.73.

Ratajski won his third European Tour title, adding to his victories at the 2019 Gibraltar Darts Trophy and the 2023 German Darts Open. It was also his first ranking title of 2026 and his 12th overall. He earned the £35,000 top prize, which saw him return to the top 20 in the PDC World Rankings for the first time in over three years. Ratajski stated that the win was not expected, claiming that he "would have been happy with the last eight or last four", and added that he hoped to play well at the upcoming World Matchplay. Despite the defeat, Wattimena described the final sessions as a "magic day" and said that it was a fair result as both players missed chances during the match.

== Draw ==
The draw was announced on 9 July. Numbers to the left of a player's name show the seedings for the top 16 in the tournament. The figures to the right of a player's name state their three-dart average in a match. The three reserve players are indicated by 'Alt'. Players in bold denote match winners.

**First round** (best of 11 legs); 10 July
**Niko Springer 105.21**	**6**
Darius Labanauskas 83.20	2
Rob Cross 93.30	3
**Alt**	**Max Hopp 95.34**	**6**
**Mickey Mansell 85.75**	**6**
Michal Šmejda 78.03	1
**Niels Zonneveld 98.54**	**6**
Daniel Klose 98.78	2
Daryl Gurney 85.98	3
**Maik Kuivenhoven 93.49**	**6**
Cameron Menzies 94.81	5
**Jan Schmidt 89.17**	**6**
William O'Connor 84.93	5
**Sebastian Białecki 86.17**	**6**
**Kevin Doets 98.72**	**6**
Alt	Dominik Grüllich 84.76	4
**Joe Cullen 97.62**	**6**
Charlie Manby 93.69	4
Andrew Gilding 91.68	5
**Alt**	**Robert Owen 97.89**	**6**
**Dirk van Duijvenbode 89.35**	**6**
Jaimy van de Weerd 87.59	3
Lukas Wenig 83.71	2
**Bradley Brooks 87.11**	**6**
**Karel Sedláček 88.84**	**6**
Rhys Griffin 89.04	5
Mario Vandenbogaerde 74.70	2
**Dragutin Horvat 79.52**	**6**
**Ryan Joyce 85.49**	**6**
(Finland) Mio Varila 72.53	1
**Kim Huybrechts 91.76**	**6**
Samuel Price 78.74	1

**Second round** (best of 11 legs); 11 July
**1**	**Gian van Veen 101.59**	**6**
Niko Springer 102.84	3
**16**	**Krzysztof Ratajski 94.07**	**6**
Alt	Max Hopp 92.37	3
**8**	**Nathan Aspinall 107.23**	**6**
Mickey Mansell 93.57	1
**9**	**Ross Smith 100.24**	**6**
Niels Zonneveld 85.89	1
**4**	**James Wade 89.58**	**6**
Maik Kuivenhoven 88.10	4
13	Mike De Decker 78.16	5
**Jan Schmidt 81.86**	**6**
5	Danny Noppert 98.26	3
**Sebastian Białecki 98.77**	**6**
12	Martin Schindler 79.12	3
**Kevin Doets 90.56**	**6**
**2**	**Michael van Gerwen 99.61**	**6**
Joe Cullen 93.32	2
**15**	**Damon Heta 92.06**	**6**
Alt	Robert Owen 86.37	4
7	Chris Dobey 95.55	2
**Dirk van Duijvenbode 94.65**	**6**
**10**	**Wessel Nijman 94.93**	**6**
Bradley Brooks 86.86	0
**3**	**Jonny Clayton 99.44**	**6**
Karel Sedláček 97.93	1
**14**	**Luke Woodhouse 91.09**	**6**
Dragutin Horvat 75.75	0
6	Stephen Bunting 87.50	4
**Ryan Joyce 91.23**	**6**
**11**	**Jermaine Wattimena 92.97**	**6**
Kim Huybrechts 78.97	0

**Third round** (best of 11 legs); 12 July
1	van Veen 88.91	3
**16**	**Ratajski 91.80**	**6**
**8**	**Aspinall 96.31**	**6**
9	Smith 94.77	4
**4**	**Wade 86.54**	**6**
Schmidt 80.15	2
**Białecki 102.15**	**6**
Doets 98.28	4
2	van Gerwen 98.32	4
**15**	**Heta 100.74**	**6**
**van Duijvenbode 91.38**	**6**
10	Nijman 96.64	3
3	Clayton 93.76	5
**14**	**Woodhouse 98.29**	**6**
Joyce 83.05	1
**11**	**Wattimena 89.66**	**6**

**Quarter-finals** (best of 11 legs); 12 July
**16**	**Ratajski 92.59**	**6**
8	Aspinall 89.87	4
4	Wade 86.71	2
**Białecki 96.93**	**6**
**15**	**Heta 96.15**	**6**
van Duijvenbode 90.30	2
14	Woodhouse 89.49	5
**11**	**Wattimena 90.16**	**6**

**Semi-finals** (best of 13 legs); 12 July
**16**	**Ratajski 100.40**	**7**
Białecki 94.57	5
15	Heta 88.52	3
**11**	**Wattimena 86.67**	**7**

**Final** (best of 15 legs); 12 July
**16**	**Ratajski 92.43**	**8**
11	Wattimena 86.73	6
