= Jan Martens =

Dutch painter (born 1939)

- Born: 19 April 1939 (age 86); Eindhoven, Netherlands
- Education: Royal Academy of Art; Jan Van Eyck Academy
- Known for: Art

Jan Martens (born 19 April 1939, in Eindhoven) is a Dutch painter.

Jan Martens studied at the Academy of Visual Arts (The Hague, 1954–1959) under the direction of Kees Bol, among others, and at the Jan van Eyck Academy (Maastricht 1961–1966). In the time between the two schooling periods, he made his living as a graphic designer and silkscreen printer. The second degree developed his fine arts skills, and he specialized in painting and sculpture. While a student, Martens spent time travelling abroad and so became acquainted with classical Greece, Islamic Morocco and classical Italy.

Marten's first artistic period was marked by Abstract Expressionism and Pop Art, producing “Mechanical Landscapes”, but also works inspired by Classical culture, such as "Il Ritorno d’Úlise". Even at that time, his painting demonstrated his characteristically baroque use of colors, in combination with transparent layers. A second is deemed by some more mature. Kimono, fans, and oriental motifs spread all over the canvas reflected his fascination for the East, especially Japan. The last works in this series are called “Magiciens de la Terre”, “Atmospheric Phenomena”, and “The Protecting Veil.” These paintings include highly poetical images with mystic elements in a mixed-media technique.

Martens taught drawing and painting at the Art Academy of Maastricht (1967–1985) and later taught the same disciplines at the Academy of Industrial Design in Eindhoven (1986). In addition, Martens won several prizes, including the Prize for Monumental Art of Sittard and Valkenburg (1966), the Encouragement Prize for Easel Painting, Eindhoven (1968), the bronze medal at the Europe Prize for Easel Painting, Ostende (1976), and has participated as a jury member at the Zollner Art contest (1991). Martens has been a member of the Professional Association of Visual Artists (B.B.K.) since 1966, the Foundation Art and Culture (Stichting Kunst & Cultuur) Limburg, Maastricht since 1992, and the Foundation Symbiose unit Art and Culture (Stichting Symbiose unit Kunst & Cultuur, 1996–1999). The artist lived in Eindhoven (1968–74), and then moved to Roermond, where he currently lives.

== See also ==
- History of painting
- Western painting
