= Nine-dart finish =

Perfect leg in the sport of darts

Standard dartboard

A nine-dart finish, also known as a nine-darter, is a perfect leg or single game in the sport of darts. The object of the game is to score a set number of points, most commonly 501; in order to win, a player must reach the target total exactly and hit a double scoring area with their last dart.

When the target is 501, the minimum number of darts needed to reach it is nine. For example, one way to achieve a nine-dart finish is to score 60 (treble 20) on each of the first seven throws, then a 57 (treble 19) on the eighth, and lastly a 24 (double 12) on the ninth. It is regarded as an extremely difficult feat to achieve—even for the sport's top players—and is considered the highest single-game achievement in the sport, similar to a maximum 147 break in snooker or a 300-point game in bowling.

The feat was first achieved on television by John Lowe in 1984, and it has since been accomplished in televised matches over a hundred times. Paul Lim was the first to hit a nine-darter in the World Championship, making history during the 1990 BDO World Darts Championship in a second-round victory over Jack McKenna. Phil Taylor has achieved the most on television, with 11, his first coming in 2002 and his last in 2015. Taylor and Michael van Gerwen are the only players to achieve two nine-darters in the same match—Taylor in the final of the 2010 Premier League against James Wade, and Van Gerwen against Ryan Murray during 2017 UK Open Qualifier 4. The following year, Brendan Dolan became the first to accomplish a nine-darter by starting and finishing with a double, as per the format of the World Grand Prix event of that year.

Adrian Lewis was the first player to hit a nine-darter in a World Championship final, doing so during the 2011 PDC World Darts Championship final against Gary Anderson. Twelve years later, Michael Smith repeated the feat in the 2023 PDC World Darts Championship final against Michael van Gerwen, after Michael van Gerwen came within 1 dart of hitting a 9 darter himself. In 2013, Terry Jenkins and Kyle Anderson were the first players to hit a nine-darter on the same day, doing so on the second day of the 2014 PDC World Darts Championship. Wade and Robert Thornton were the first players to both achieve a perfect leg in the same match, doing so during the 2014 World Grand Prix. In 2023, Fallon Sherrock became the first woman to achieve the feat on television. At the 2024 Bahrain Darts Masters, Luke Littler became the youngest player to hit a televised nine-darter, accomplishing the feat two days before his 17th birthday.

== Methods of achievement ==
A table depicting all paths to a nine-dart finish.

A table depicting all paths to a double-in double-out nine-dart finish.

A single game of darts (known as a leg) requires a player to score exactly 501 points, ending with a double (which includes the bullseye). Each shot consists of exactly three darts, and 60 is the maximum that can be scored with any one dart. Thus 180 is the maximum score from a shot, and nine throws are the minimum necessary to win.

Although many other combinations are possible, the traditional nine-dart finish requires a score of 60 (treble 20) with each of the first six throws: that is, with the first two shots of three. That leaves 141 to score on the final shot (of three darts), known as the outshot.

This outshot of 141 is traditionally performed in one of five ways:

- treble 20 (60), treble 19 (57) and double 12 (24)
- treble 20 (60), treble 15 (45) and double 18 (36)
- treble 19 (57), treble 16 (48) and double 18 (36)
- treble 17 (51), treble 18 (54) and double 18 (36)
- treble 20 (60), treble 17 (51) and double 15 (30)

Another way is to score 167 with each set of three darts, scoring 501 in total, in the following way:

- treble 20 (60), treble 19 (57) and bullseye (50)

By throwing each dart of a shot to a different place on the board, this eliminates the chance of any dart being deflected by an already thrown dart into the wrong scoring area but it is usually seen only in exhibition matches, as in tournaments, players are inclined to aim for the treble 20, only switching to the treble 19 for a cover shot.

Arguably the most difficult nine-dart finish would be 180 (3×T20), 171 (3×T19), and 150 (3×bullseye) – owing to the difficulty of getting all three darts in the bullseye: it is the smallest double on the board.

A nine-dart finish is also attainable in games which require a double to start scoring (a double-in; such games are thus termed double-in double-out with the existing double-out requirement). In such games, throwing for double 20 first can lead to a maximum score of 160 with the first shot, leaving the thrower commonly requiring 180 then 161 (T20, T17, bullseye) with their remaining six darts, though other outshots are possible. It is worth noting that in these games, only throwing for double 20, double 17, or bullseye to start the leg can result in a nine-dart finish, and if the bullseye is not the double-in, it must be the double-out (it can be both, although this would require a highly unorthodox finish using two bullseyes, such as T17-Bull-Bull for a 151).

The total number of different ways of achieving 501 with nine darts is 3,944, of which 2,296 finish with the bullseye, 672 end on D20, 792 on D18, 56 end on D17, 120 end on D15, and 8 end on D12. 574 of the possible ways can be used in a double-in double-out game.

== Nine-dart finishes in televised matches ==
As of 21 November 2026, 114 nine-darters have been thrown in televised matches by 49 different players. 81 of those 102 hit two 180s and finished with a 141 check-out. English players have achieved a total of 57 nine-darters, 19 have been achieved by Dutch players, eight by Welsh players, six by Scottish players, four by Australians, three by Belgian and Irish players, two by Northern Irish, Portuguese and American (Note: Paul Lim was representing the United States when he threw his nine-darter. He has subsequently represented Singapore.) players and one nine-darter has been achieved by players from Canada, Lithuania, Poland and Sweden.

The first televised nine-dart finish was achieved at the MFI World Matchplay on 13 October 1984 by John Lowe, who checked out 141 with T17, T18, D18 after scoring two maximum 180s. For this he received a prize of £102,000, going on to win the whole event. This nine-dart finish was not broadcast live, nor was Paul Lim's at the 1990 BDO World Darts Championship. The first ever live broadcast nine-dart finish was performed by Shaun Greatbatch against Steve Coote in the final of the Dutch Open on 3 February 2002, while Phil Taylor achieved the first live nine-darter broadcast on British television during the 2002 World Matchplay.

Taylor has achieved the feat more than any other darts player on television, having done so 11 times. His first came on 1 August 2002 during a quarter-final tie against Chris Mason at the 2002 World Matchplay in Blackpool, for which Taylor received £100,000. Despite having achieved the feat a record 11 times, Taylor never hit a nine-darter in the World Championship, missing a chance on the outside wire of double 12 in his last match in the 2018 Final.

The youngest player to throw a televised nine-darter is Luke Littler, who hit the perfect leg in the quarter-finals of the 2024 Bahrain Darts Masters. The match was broadcast live on ITV4 in the UK. Littler was 16 years, 363 days old at the time.

The 2007 International Darts League became the first televised tournament to witness two nine-darters when Phil Taylor's nine-dart finish against Raymond van Barneveld was matched the following day by another one from Tony O'Shea against Adrian Lewis. In the second round of the 2008 Grand Slam of Darts in Wolverhampton, James Wade hit his first televised nine-dart-finish against Gary Anderson. The event was shown live on ITV4, making it the first time a nine-darter had been seen live on free-to-air television in the United Kingdom. Mervyn King hit his first televised nine-dart finish in the 2009 South African Masters in September 2009 against Wade, becoming the first player do so outside of Europe.

On 24 May 2010, in the Premier League final against Wade, Taylor made history by being the first player to ever hit two nine-dart finishes in a single match. These were his seventh and eighth nine-dart finishes. On 10 February 2017, Michael van Gerwen became the second player to hit two nine-dart finishes in a match, in a 2017 UK Open qualification event against Ryan Murray.

Brendan Dolan was the first player ever to hit a nine-darter in a double-in double-out game, doing so in the semi-final of the 2011 World Grand Prix against James Wade on 8 October. He opened with double 20, before hitting successive treble 20s (160, 180) and then finished on 161 with T20, T17 and a bullseye. He later changed his nickname to "The History Maker" to reflect his feat. In October 2014 at the World Grand Prix, Wade and his opponent Robert Thornton became the first players to both hit a nine-darter in the same match. Wade is the only player to have hit a 'standard' nine-darter and a double-in double-out nine-darter in televised matches.

William Borland hit a nine-darter at the 2022 PDC World Darts Championship in his first-round matchup in the last leg of the match to become the first person to win a match on TV in the PDC by hitting a nine-darter. On 17 February 2022, Gerwyn Price achieved two nine-dart finishes on the same day, doing so in two separate matches during night 3 of the 2022 Premier League Darts during a win against Michael van Gerwen in the semi-final, and then against James Wade in the final. In total, Price achieved four nine-dart finishes in 2022; no player had previously managed more than two.

In the semi-final of the 2025 World Matchplay, Luke Littler won the first televised PDC leg where every dart was perfect. Both Littler and his opponent Josh Rock had opened the leg with two 180s each before Littler, who had thrown first, completed the nine-darter. However, this was not the first recorded instance of a leg where all 15 darts of the leg were perfect — it had previously occurred in a match between Niko Springer and Manfred Bilderl at the 2023 PDC Europe Super League.

=== World Championship nine-darters ===
The first player to manage the outshot in the World Championship was Paul Lim on 9 January 1990 against Jack McKenna. Lim won a £52,000 bonus for the feat, more than the £24,000 Phil Taylor received for winning the event. In the 2018 PDC World Darts Championship, Lim missed double 12 in his second round match against Gary Anderson, which would have made him the first player to do a nine-dart finish in both versions of the World Darts Championship.

Even with two versions of the World Championship in operation, Lim's achievement was not repeated for nearly 19 years until 2 January 2009, when Raymond van Barneveld became the second person to achieve the feat and the first since the split in darts. The finish came against Jelle Klaasen in the quarter-final of the 2009 World Championship at Alexandra Palace, and he claimed a £20,000 bonus prize. On 28 December 2009 he repeated the feat at the 2010 World Championship during his second round clash with Brendan Dolan.

Adrian Lewis achieved a nine-dart finish in the third leg of the 2011 World Championship final against Gary Anderson. On 23 December 2012 at the 2013 World Championship, Dean Winstanley hit a nine-dart finish in the third leg of the third set in his second round defeat to Vincent van der Voort. Another nine-dart finish at this Championship was achieved by Michael van Gerwen in his semi-final victory over James Wade in the third leg of the fifth set. The leg after the nine-darter (the fourth leg of the fifth set) van Gerwen hit another eight perfect darts but missed the last dart at the double to achieve consecutive nine-dart finishes.

On 14 December 2013 at the 2014 World Championship, Terry Jenkins and Kyle Anderson both hit nine-darters in their first round losses against Per Laursen and Ian White, respectively. On 30 December 2014 in the third round of the 2015 World Championship, Adrian Lewis hit his second World Championship nine-dart finish and his third overall, though he lost the match 3–4 to Van Barneveld. On 2 January 2016 in the semi-finals of the 2016 World Championship, Gary Anderson hit a nine-dart finish to defeat Klaasen 6–0 to reach his third World Championship final.

On 17 December 2021, during the first round of the 2022 World Championship, William Borland hit a nine-dart finish to defeat Bradley Brooks 3–2 in a last leg decider to reach the second round, becoming the first player in PDC history to win a televised match with a nine-dart finish. He described it as "the best night of my life". The following day, Darius Labanauskas achieved the feat during a 3–1 loss to Mike De Decker. In the quarter-final, defending champion Gerwyn Price hit the third of the tournament in a loss to Michael Smith.

On 3 January 2023, in the 2023 PDC World Darts Championship Final, Michael Smith and Michael van Gerwen both had three darts left to achieve a nine-dart finish in the same leg, later dubbed "the greatest leg in the history of darts". After van Gerwen missed on his ninth dart, Smith checked out 141, becoming the first player to register a nine-dart finish in the same leg that an opponent had missed-out by one dart. He thus became the second player to hit a 'nine-darter' in the final of the event. After Smith successfully completed his finish, popular commentator Wayne Mardle famously said 'I can't speak! I can't speak'.

On 18 December 2024, during the first round of the 2025 PDC World Darts Championship, Christian Kist hit a nine-dart finish to win the opening set of his match with Madars Razma, the first nine-darter at the World Championship since Michael Smith's famous leg. Kist went on to lose 3–1 to Razma. Kist earned a £60,000 bonus from tournament sponsor Paddy Power for achieving the feat. Damon Heta achieved the second nine-dart finish of the tournament in his third round loss to Luke Woodhouse.

== List of televised nine-dart finishes ==
No.	Date	Player	Opponent	Tournament	Method	Broadcast	Ref.
1	13 October 1984	(England) John Lowe	(England) Keith Deller	MFI World Matchplay	3 x T20; 3 x T20; T17, T18, D18	ITV	
2	9 January 1990	(United States) Paul Lim	(Republic of Ireland) Jack McKenna	BDO World Championship	3 x T20; 3 x T20; T20, T19, D12	BBC	
3	3 February 2002	(England) Shaun Greatbatch	(England) Steve Coote	Dutch Open	3 x T20; 3 x T20; T20, T15, D18	SBS6	
4	1 August 2002	(England) Phil Taylor	(England) Chris Mason	World Matchplay	3 x T20; 3 x T20; T20, T19, D12	Sky Sports	
5	5 June 2004	(England) Phil Taylor (2)	(England) Matt Chapman	UK Open	3 x T20; 3 x T20; T20, T19, D12	Sky Sports	
6	12 June 2005	(England) Phil Taylor (3)	(Netherlands) Roland Scholten	UK Open	3 x T20; 3 x T20; T20, T19, D12	Sky Sports	
7	23 March 2006	(Netherlands) Raymond van Barneveld	(England) Peter Manley	Premier League Darts	3 x T20; 3 x T20; T20, T19, D12	Sky Sports	
8	17 February 2007	(Netherlands) Michael van Gerwen	(Netherlands) Raymond van Barneveld	Masters of Darts	T20, 2 x T19; 3 x T20; T20, T17, D18	SBS6	
9	8 May 2007	(England) Phil Taylor (4)	(Netherlands) Raymond van Barneveld	International Darts League	3 x T20; 3 x T20; T20, T19, D12	SBS6	
10	9 May 2007	(England) Tony O'Shea	(England) Adrian Lewis	International Darts League	3 x T20; 3 x T20; T20, T19, D12	SBS6	
11	9 June 2007	(England) Phil Taylor (5)	(England) Wes Newton	UK Open	3 x T20; 3 x T20; T20, T19, D12	Sky Sports	
12	17 November 2007	(England) John Walton	(Wales) Martin Phillips	World Masters	3 x T20; 3 x T20; T20, T19, D12	BBC	
13	6 June 2008	(England) Phil Taylor (6)	(Scotland) Jamie Harvey	UK Open	3 x T20; 2 x T20, T19; 2 x T20, D12	Sky Sports	
14	20 November 2008	(England) James Wade	(Scotland) Gary Anderson	Grand Slam of Darts	3 x T20; 3 x T20; T20, T19, D12	ITV	
15	2 January 2009	(Netherlands) Raymond van Barneveld (2)	(Netherlands) Jelle Klaasen	PDC World Championship	3 x T20; 3 x T20; T20, T19, D12	Sky Sports	
16	27 September 2009	(England) Mervyn King	(England) James Wade	South African Masters	3 x T20; 3 x T20; T20, T19, D12	Sky Sports	
17	13 December 2009	(England) Darryl Fitton	(Scotland) Ross Montgomery	Zuiderduin Masters	2 x T20, T19; 3 x T20; 2 x T20, D12		
18	28 December 2009	(Netherlands) Raymond van Barneveld (3)	(Northern Ireland) Brendan Dolan	PDC World Championship	3 x T20; 3 x T20; T20, T19, D12	Sky Sports	
19	29 April 2010	(Netherlands) Raymond van Barneveld (4)	(England) Terry Jenkins	Premier League Darts	3 x T20; 3 x T20; T20, T19, D12	Sky Sports	
20	24 May 2010	(England) Phil Taylor (7)	(England) James Wade	Premier League Darts	T20, 2 x T19; 3 x T20; T20, T17, D18	Sky Sports	
21	24 May 2010	(England) Phil Taylor (8)	(England) James Wade	Premier League Darts	3 x T20; 3 x T20; T20, T19, D12	Sky Sports	
22	5 June 2010	(England) Mervyn King (2)	(Scotland) Gary Anderson	UK Open	3 x T20; 3 x T20; T20, T19, D12	Sky Sports	
23	17 July 2010	(Netherlands) Raymond van Barneveld (5)	(England) Denis Ovens	World Matchplay	3 x T20; 3 x T20; T20, T19, D12	Sky Sports	
24	3 January 2011	(England) Adrian Lewis	(Scotland) Gary Anderson	PDC World Championship	3 x T20; 3 x T20; T20, T19, D12	Sky Sports	
25	16 July 2011	(Canada) John Part	(Wales) Mark Webster	World Matchplay	3 x T20; 3 x T20; T20, T19, D12	Sky Sports	
26	31 July 2011	(England) Adrian Lewis (2)	(Netherlands) Raymond van Barneveld	European Championship	3 x T20; 3 x T20; T20, T19, D12	ITV	
27	8 October 2011	(Northern Ireland) Brendan Dolan	(England) James Wade	World Grand Prix	double-in double-out D20, 2 x T20; 3 x T20; T20, T17, bullseye	Sky Sports	
28	16 February 2012	(England) Phil Taylor (9)	(England) Kevin Painter	Premier League Darts	3 x T20; T20, 2 x T19; T20, T17, D18	Sky Sports	
29	17 May 2012	(Australia) Simon Whitlock	(England) Andy Hamilton	Premier League Darts	3 x T20; 3 x T20; T20, T15, D18	Sky Sports	
30	8 June 2012	(Scotland) Gary Anderson	(England) Davey Dodds	UK Open	3 x T20; 3 x T20; T20, T19, D12	Sky Sports	
31	25 July 2012	(Netherlands) Michael van Gerwen (2)	(England) Steve Beaton	World Matchplay	3 x T20; 3 x T20; T20, T19, D12	Sky Sports	
32	26 July 2012	(England) Wes Newton	(England) Justin Pipe	World Matchplay	3 x T20; 2 x T20, T19; 2 x T20, D12	Sky Sports	
33	23 December 2012	(England) Dean Winstanley	(Netherlands) Vincent van der Voort	PDC World Championship	3 x T20; 3 x T20; T20, T19, D12	Sky Sports	
34	30 December 2012	(Netherlands) Michael van Gerwen (3)	(England) James Wade	PDC World Championship	3 x T20; 2 x T20, T19; 2 x T20, D12	Sky Sports	
35	14 December 2013	(England) Terry Jenkins	(Denmark) Per Laursen	PDC World Championship	3 x T20; 3 x T20; T20, T19, D12	Sky Sports	
36	14 December 2013	(Australia) Kyle Anderson	(England) Ian White	PDC World Championship	3 x T20; 3 x T20; T20, T19, D12	Sky Sports	
37	23 July 2014	(England) Phil Taylor (10)	(England) Michael Smith	World Matchplay	3 x T20; 2 x T20, T19; 2 x T20, D12	Sky Sports	
38	8 October 2014	(England) James Wade (2)	(Scotland) Robert Thornton	World Grand Prix	double-in double-out D20, 2 x T20; 3 x T20; T20, T17, bullseye	Sky Sports	
39	8 October 2014	(Scotland) Robert Thornton	(England) James Wade	World Grand Prix	double-in double-out D20, 2 x T20; 3 x T20; T20, T17, bullseye	Sky Sports	
40	26 October 2014	(Netherlands) Michael van Gerwen (4)	(Netherlands) Raymond van Barneveld	European Championship	2 x T20, T19; 3 x T20; 2 x T20, D12	ITV	
41	14 November 2014	(Belgium) Kim Huybrechts	Michael van Gerwen	Grand Slam of Darts	3 x T20; 3 x T20; T20, T19, D12	Sky Sports	
42	30 December 2014	(England) Adrian Lewis (3)	(Netherlands) Raymond van Barneveld	PDC World Championship	3 x T20; 3 x T20; T20, T19, D12	Sky Sports	
43	1 February 2015	(England) Darryl Fitton (2)	(England) Martin Adams	Dutch Open	3 x T20; 3 x T20; T20, T19, D12		
44	22 August 2015	(England) Phil Taylor (11)	(Scotland) Peter Wright	Sydney Darts Masters	3 x T20; 3 x T20; T20, T19, D12	ITV	
45	8 November 2015	(England) Dave Chisnall	(Scotland) Peter Wright	Grand Slam of Darts	3 x T20; 3 x T20; T20, T19, D12	Sky Sports	
46	2 January 2016	(Scotland) Gary Anderson (2)	(Netherlands) Jelle Klaasen	PDC World Championship	3 x T20; 3 x T20; T20, T19, D12	Sky Sports	
47	5 March 2016	(Netherlands) Michael van Gerwen (5)	(England) Rob Cross	UK Open	3 x T20; 3 x T20; T20, T19, D12	ITV	
48	14 April 2016	(England) Adrian Lewis (4)	(England) James Wade	Premier League Darts	3 x T20; 2 x T20, T19; 2 x T20, D12	Sky Sports	
49	25 November 2016	(England) Alan Norris	(England) Michael Smith	Players Championship Finals	3 x T20; 3 x T20; T20, T19, D12	ITV	
50	13 April 2017	(England) Adrian Lewis (5)	(Netherlands) Raymond van Barneveld	Premier League Darts	3 x T20; 3 x T20; T20, T19, D12	Sky Sports	
51	29 October 2017	(Australia) Kyle Anderson (2)	Michael van Gerwen	European Championship	3 x T20; 3 x T20; T20, T19, D12	ITV	
52	26 July 2018	(Scotland) Gary Anderson (3)	(England) Joe Cullen	World Matchplay	3 x T20; 3 x T20; T20, T19, D12	Sky Sports	
53	14 November 2018	(Belgium) Dimitri Van den Bergh	(England) Stephen Bunting	Grand Slam of Darts	3 x T20; 3 x T20; T20, T19, D12	Sky Sports	
54	23 November 2019	(Netherlands) Michael van Gerwen (6)	(England) Adrian Lewis	Players Championship Finals	3 x T20; 2 x T20, T19; 2 x T20, D12	ITV	
55	27 February 2020	(England) Michael Smith	(Northern Ireland) Daryl Gurney	Premier League Darts	3 x T20; 3 x T20; T20, T19, D12	Sky Sports	
56	7 March 2020	(Wales) Jonny Clayton	(England) Chris Dobey	UK Open	3 x T20; 3 x T20; T20, T19, D12	ITV	
57	8 March 2020	(Netherlands) Michael van Gerwen (7)	(Northern Ireland) Daryl Gurney	UK Open	3 x T20; 3 x T20; T20, T19, D12	ITV	
58	29 August 2020	(Scotland) Peter Wright	(Northern Ireland) Daryl Gurney	Premier League Darts	3 x T20; 3 x T20; T20, T19, D12	Sky Sports	
59	29 October 2020	(Portugal) José de Sousa	(Netherlands) Jeffrey de Zwaan	European Championship	3 x T20; 2 x T20, T19; 2 x T20, D12	ITV	
60	29 December 2020	(England) James Wade (3)	(England) Stephen Bunting	PDC World Championship	3 x T20; 3 x T20; T20, T19, D12	Sky Sports	
61	7 April 2021	Jonny Clayton (2)	José de Sousa	Premier League Darts	3 x T20; 3 x T20; T20, T19, D12	Sky Sports	
62	8 April 2021	José de Sousa (2)	Nathan Aspinall	Premier League Darts	3 x T20; 3 x T20; T20, T19, D12	Sky Sports	
63	28 August 2021	Richie Burnett	Scott Williams	Online Darts Live League	3 x T20; 3 x T20; T20, T15, D18	Sporty Stuff TV	
64	1 September 2021	(England) Martin Adams	(England) Jamie Caven	Online Darts Live League	3 x T20; 3 x T20; T20, T19, D12	Sporty Stuff TV	
65	9 September 2021	(England) Colin Osborne	John O'Shea	Online Darts Live League	3 x T20; 2 x T20, T19; 2 x T20, D12	Sporty Stuff TV	
66	22 November 2021	(England) Martin Adams (2)	Scott Williams	Online Darts Live League	3 x T20; 3 x T20; T20, T19, D12	Sporty Stuff TV	
67	17 December 2021	William Borland	Bradley Brooks	PDC World Championship	3 x T20; 2 x T20, T19; 2 x T20, D12	Sky Sports	
68	18 December 2021	Darius Labanauskas	Mike De Decker	PDC World Championship	T20, 2 x T19; 3 x T20; T20, T17, D18	Sky Sports	
69	1 January 2022	Gerwyn Price	Michael Smith	PDC World Championship	3 x T20; 3 x T20; T19, T20, D12	Sky Sports	
70	17 February 2022	Gerwyn Price (2)	Michael van Gerwen	Premier League Darts	2 x T20, T19; 3 x T20; 2 x T20, D12	Sky Sports	
71	17 February 2022	Gerwyn Price (3)	James Wade	Premier League Darts	3 x T20; 3 x T20; T19, T20, D12	Sky Sports	
72	5 March 2022	James Wade (4)	Boris Krčmar	UK Open	3 x T20; 3 x T20; T20, T19, D12	ITV	
73	5 March 2022	Michael Smith (2)	Mensur Suljović	UK Open	3 x T20; 3 x T20; T20, T19, D12	ITV	
74	2 July 2022	(Republic of Ireland) Conor Heneghan	Thibault Tricole	Online Darts Live League	3 x T20; 3 x T20; T20, T19, D12	Sporty Stuff TV	
75	22 July 2022	Graham Usher	(England) Dan Read	Online Darts Live League	3 x T20; 3 x T20; T20, T19, D12	Sporty Stuff TV	
76	23 July 2022	Gerwyn Price (4)	Danny Noppert	World Matchplay	3 x T20; 3 x T20; T19, T20, D12	Sky Sports	
77	16 September 2022	(Republic of Ireland) Conor Heneghan (2)	Adam Smith-Neale	MODUS Super Series	3 x T20; 3 x T20; T20, T19, D12	Sporty Stuff TV	
78	22 September 2022	Dave Chisnall (2)	Danny Noppert	Belgian Darts Open	3 x T20; 3 x T20; T20, T19, D12	VTM	
79	17 November 2022	Josh Rock	Michael van Gerwen	Grand Slam of Darts	3 x T20; 3 x T20; T20, T19, D12	Sky Sports	
80	27 November 2022	Michael van Gerwen (8)	Rob Cross	Players Championship Finals	2 x T20, T19; 3 x T20; 2 x T20, D12	ITV	
81	3 January 2023	Michael Smith (3)	Michael van Gerwen	PDC World Championship	3 x T20; 3 x T20; T20, T19, D12	Sky Sports	
82	9 March 2023	(Republic of Ireland) Conor Heneghan (3)	Alan Norris	MODUS Super Series	3 x T20; 3 x T20; T20, T19, D12	Sporty Stuff TV	
83	4 August 2023	Steve West	(England) Luke Littler	MODUS Super Series	3 x T20; 3 x T20; T20, T19, D12	Sporty Stuff TV	
84	15 August 2023	(England) Darryl Pilgrim	(England) Scott Taylor	MODUS Super Series	3 x T20; 3 x T20; T20, T15, D18	Sporty Stuff TV	
85	25 August 2023	Fallon Sherrock	(England) Adam Lipscombe	MODUS Super Series	3 x T20; 3 x T20; T20, T19, D12	Sporty Stuff TV	
86	17 September 2023	Michael van Gerwen (9)	(England) Luke Humphries	World Series of Darts Finals	T20, 2 x T19; 3 x T20; T20, T17, D18	ITV	
87	2 November 2023	Sebastian Białecki	Anton Östlund	MODUS Super Series	3 x T20; 2 x T20, T19; 2 x T20, D12	Sporty Stuff TV	
88	13 November 2023	Ryan Searle	Nathan Rafferty	Grand Slam of Darts	3 x T20; 3 x T20; T20, T19, D12	Sky Sports	
89	25 November 2023	Leonard Gates	(England) Martin Thomas	MODUS Super Series	3 x T20; 3 x T20; T20, T19, D12	Sporty Stuff TV	
90	26 November 2023	Michael van Gerwen (10)	Luke Humphries	Players Championship Finals	3 x T20; 3 x T20; T20, T19, D12	ITV	
91	10 December 2023	(Sweden) Andreas Harrysson	(Denmark) Andreas Toft-Jørgensen	Modus Super Series	3 x T20; 3 x T20; T20, T15, D18	Sporty Stuff TV	
92	19 January 2024	Luke Littler	Nathan Aspinall	Bahrain Darts Masters	3 x T20; 3 x T20; T20, T19, D12	ITV	
93	10 March 2024	Luke Littler (2)	Rob Cross	Belgian Darts Open	2 x T20, T19; 3 x T20; 2 x T20, D12	VTM	
94	4 April 2024	Gerwyn Price (5)	Michael Smith	Premier League Darts	3 x T20; 3 x T20; T19, T20, D12	Sky Sports	
95	23 May 2024	Luke Littler (3)	Luke Humphries	Premier League Darts	3 x T20; 3 x T20; T20, T19, D12	Sky Sports	
96	14 July 2024	Dimitri Van den Bergh (2)	Martin Schindler	World Matchplay	3 x T20; 3 x T20; T20, T19, D12	Sky Sports	
97	18 December 2024	Christian Kist	Madars Razma	PDC World Championship	3 x T20; 3 x T20; T20, T19, D12	Sky Sports	
98	27 December 2024	Damon Heta	Luke Woodhouse	PDC World Championship	3 x T20; 3 x T20; T20, T19, D12	Sky Sports	
99	1 February 2025	Dimitri Van den Bergh (3)	Michael van Gerwen	PDC World Masters	3 x T20; 3 x T20, T20, T15, D18	ITV	
100	6 March 2025	Luke Humphries	Rob Cross	Premier League Darts	3 x T20; 3 x T20; T20, T19, D12	Sky Sports	
101	6 March 2025	Rob Cross	Nathan Aspinall	Premier League Darts	3 x T20; 3 x T20; T19, T16, D18	Sky Sports	
102	20 March 2025	Luke Littler (4)	Michael van Gerwen	Premier League Darts	3 x T20; 3 x T20; T20, T17, D15	Sky Sports	
103	10 April 2025	Gerwyn Price (6)	Luke Littler	Premier League Darts	3 x T20; 3 x T20; T19, T20, D12	Sky Sports	
104	15 May 2025	Gerwyn Price (7)	Stephen Bunting	Premier League Darts	3 x T20; 3 x T20; T19, T20, D12	Sky Sports	
105	26 July 2025	Luke Littler (5)	Josh Rock	World Matchplay	3 x T20; 3 x T20; T20, T17, D15	Sky Sports	
106	9 November 2025	Luke Humphries (2)	Michael Smith	Grand Slam of Darts	2 x T20, T19; 3 x T20; 2 x T20, D12	Sky Sports	
107	31 January 2026	Luke Humphries (3)	Luke Woodhouse	PDC World Masters	3 x T20; 3 x T20; T20, T19, D12	ITV	
108	22 February 2026	Gian van Veen	Luke Littler	Poland Darts Open	3 x T20; 3 x T20; T20, T19, D12	Canal+	
109	26 February 2026	Josh Rock (2)	Gian van Veen	Premier League Darts	3 x T20; 3 x T20; T20, T19, D12	Sky Sports	
110	6 March 2026	Danny Noppert	Dimitri Van den Bergh	UK Open	3 x T20; 3 x T20; T20, T19, D12	Viaplay TV, VTM	
111	21 July 2026	Luke Littler (6)	Nathan Aspinall	World Matchplay	3 x T20; 3 x T20; T20, T17, D15	Sky Sports	
112	22 October 2026	Luke Woodhouse	Dirk van Duijvenbode	European Championship	3 x T20; 3 x T20; T20, T19, D12	ITV	
113	21 November 2026	Michael van Gerwen (11)	Tom Sykes	Grand Slam of Darts	3 x T20; 3 x T20; T20, T19, D12	Sky Sports	
114	21 November 2026	Tom Sykes	Michael van Gerwen	Grand Slam of Darts	3 x T20; 3 x T20; T20, T19, D12	Sky Sports	

== Statistics ==
=== Multiple nine-darters in televised matches ===
The following table lists the number of perfect legs recorded by players who have scored multiple nine-darters in televised matches.

As of 21 November 2026

Rank	Player	Nine-darters	Last
1	(England) Phil Taylor	11	2015
1	(Netherlands) Michael van Gerwen	11	2026
3	(Wales) Gerwyn Price	7	2025
4	(England) Luke Littler	6	2026
5	(Netherlands) Raymond van Barneveld	5	2010
5	(England) Adrian Lewis	5	2017
7	(England) James Wade	4	2022
8	(Scotland) Gary Anderson	3	2018
8	(England) Michael Smith	3	2023
8	(Republic of Ireland) Conor Heneghan	3	2023
8	(Belgium) Dimitri Van den Bergh	3	2025
8	(England) Luke Humphries	3	2026
13	(England) Mervyn King	2	2010
13	(England) Darryl Fitton	2	2015
13	(Australia) Kyle Anderson	2	2017
13	(Wales) Jonny Clayton	2	2021
13	(Portugal) José de Sousa	2	2021
13	(England) Martin Adams	2	2021
13	(England) Dave Chisnall	2	2022
13	(Northern Ireland) Josh Rock	2	2026

=== Nine-darter in televised matches by tournament ===
Tournament	Total	Org.	Achieved by	Last
Premier League Darts	22	PDC	Gerwyn Price (5), Phil Taylor (3), Raymond van Barneveld (2), Adrian Lewis (2), Luke Littler (2), Simon Whitlock, Michael Smith, Peter Wright, Jonny Clayton, José de Sousa, Luke Humphries, Rob Cross, Josh Rock	2026
PDC World Darts Championship	16	PDC	Raymond van Barneveld (2), Adrian Lewis (2), Dean Winstanley, Michael van Gerwen, Terry Jenkins, Kyle Anderson, Gary Anderson, James Wade, William Borland, Darius Labanauskas, Gerwyn Price, Michael Smith, Christian Kist, Damon Heta	2025
UK Open	12	PDC	Phil Taylor (4), Michael van Gerwen (2), Mervyn King, Gary Anderson, Jonny Clayton, James Wade, Michael Smith, Danny Noppert	2026
PDC World Matchplay	11	PDC	Phil Taylor (2), Luke Littler (2), Raymond van Barneveld, John Part, Michael van Gerwen, Wes Newton, Gary Anderson, Gerwyn Price, Dimitri Van den Bergh	2026
Grand Slam of Darts	9	PDC	James Wade, Kim Huybrechts, Dave Chisnall, Dimitri Van den Bergh, Josh Rock, Ryan Searle, Luke Humphries, Michael van Gerwen, Tom Sykes	2026
MODUS Super Series	8	ADC	Conor Heneghan (2), Steve West, Darryl Pilgrim, Fallon Sherrock, Sebastian Białecki, Leonard Gates, Andreas Harrysson	2024
Online Darts Live League	6	ADC	Martin Adams (2), Richie Burnett, Colin Osborne, Conor Heneghan, Graham Usher	2022
European Championship	5	PDC	Adrian Lewis, Michael van Gerwen, Kyle Anderson, José de Sousa, Luke Woodhouse	2026
Players Championship Finals	4	PDC	Michael van Gerwen (3), Alan Norris	2023
World Grand Prix	3	PDC	Brendan Dolan, James Wade, Robert Thornton	2014
International Darts League	2	BDO	Phil Taylor, Tony O'Shea	2007
Dutch Open	2	BDO	Shaun Greatbatch, Darryl Fitton	2015
Belgian Darts Open	2	PDC	Dave Chisnall, Luke Littler	2024
PDC World Masters	2	PDC	Dimitri van den Bergh, Luke Humphries	2026
MFI World Matchplay	1	BDO	John Lowe	1984
BDO World Darts Championship	1	BDO	Paul Lim	1990
Masters of Darts	1	PDC; BDO	Michael van Gerwen	2007
World Masters	1	BDO	John Walton	2007
South African Masters	1	PDC	Mervyn King	2009
Zuiderduin Masters	1	BDO	Darryl Fitton	2009
Sydney Darts Masters	1	PDC	Phil Taylor	2015
World Series of Darts Finals	1	PDC	Michael van Gerwen	2023
Bahrain Darts Masters	1	PDC	Luke Littler	2024

== Nine-dart-finish prize money ==
In 1984, John Lowe pocketed £102,000 for the first TV perfect leg. With nine-dart finishes now thrown on a regular basis the reward for throwing one has decreased. Until 2013 the PDC had a rolling £400 prize-pool for a nine-dart leg. As long as it wasn't won, it increased by £400 for the next event. In 2013 the bonus stopped being awarded. For all PDC Premier events, the PDC formerly had a rolling £5,000 prize-pool for a nine-dart leg. As long as it isn't won, the prize for hitting a nine-dart leg is increased by £5,000. If multiple players hit a nine-dart finish in one premier event, the money is split evenly across all players who achieved a nine-dart finish in that event. So the prize for a nine-darter varies for every PDC premier event. In the 2015 tournament, achieving the perfect leg in the PDC World Championships would win £10,000, (in the 2014 tournament the prize was £30,000). The reward for a nine-darter during the most recent BDO World Darts Championship was £52,000.

In 2019, a special prize of £100,000 was available to any player who hit two nine-dart finishes at the PDC World Championship, a feat which has as of December 2024 never been achieved at any World Championship. From 2019 to 2024 prize money for nine-dart finishes were withdrawn, owing to the ever increasing prize fund for tournaments.

Prior to the 2025 PDC World Darts Championship, title sponsors Paddy Power announced that they would be giving out a total of £180,000 for every nine-dart finish hit in the tournament, with the player, a spectator in the crowd and Prostate Cancer UK receiving £60,000 each. This campaign remained in place for the 2026 event.

== Women's nine-darters ==
Mandy Solomons was the first woman to ever record a nine-dart finish in competition. It came in a match against Robert Hughes during the qualifying rounds for the 1996 BDO World Championship on 30 November 1995 at Earls Court, London. It was the first time female players were allowed to enter the qualifying rounds for the BDO World Championship. Hughes did end up winning the match 2–0, however. Solomons was also one of the first women to record a nine-dart finish in a regional Super League match.

Claire Stainsby and Glen Durrant made history when they recorded the first ever nine-dart finish in mixed pairs competition at the 2013 BDO International Open in Brean, Somerset. Durrant opened up with a 177, and then Stainsby followed that up with a 180 to leave Durrant on 144, which he ended up taking out for the first nine-dart finish in mixed pairs competition. As a result, Claire Stainsby was inducted into the BDO 9-Dart Club, thus becoming the first and so far only female to be inducted.

15-year-old Beau Greaves hit a nine-darter in a competition at Balby Bridge on 17 April 2019. Later, in 2026, at Players Championship 6, Greaves became the first woman to hit a nine-dart finish on the PDC Pro Tour, doing so in her second-round match against Mensur Suljović.

In 2023, during her 5–3 victory over Marco Verhofstad, Fallon Sherrock became the first woman to hit a nine-darter at a PDC event. Later, on 25 August 2023, Sherrock became the first woman to hit a televised 9 darter, during the Modus Super Series: Online Darts Live League.

Ten-time World Champion Trina Gulliver revealed she has twice missed her last dart to record a nine-dart finish. One was a double 18 for $100,000 at an event in Canada and another missed double was for a car at an event in Ireland.

== See also ==
- Change-making problem – making particular numbers with given denominations
- Maximum break in snooker
- Perfect game in bowling
- Perfect game in baseball
- Golden set in tennis
- Eight-ender in curling
