= 2010 Dutch Open (darts) =

The 2010 Dutch Open was the 38th edition of the Dutch Open darts competition.

Martin Adams won the tournament over fellow Englishman Scott Waites.

== Draw ==
Round 2
(Netherlands) | Patrick Loos | 3
(Netherlands) | Dave Proosten | 0
(Netherlands) | Danny van de Kooy | 1
(England) | Scott Mitchell | 3
(Netherlands) | Jerry Hendriks | 2
(Scotland) | Ross Montgomery | 3
(England) | Robbie Green | 3
(Netherlands) | Mark de Wolf | 2
(Netherlands) | Remon Hurrebrink | 1
(England) | Scott Waites | 3
(Netherlands) | Cor Ernst | 3
(Scotland) | Mark Barilli | 1
(Netherlands) | Stefan Gerritsen | 0
(Netherlands) | Benito van de Pas | 3
(England) | Paul Gibbs | 3
(Netherlands) | Davy Mertens | 2
(Netherlands) | Edwin Max | 3
(Germany) | Andy Wright | 1
(England) | Lewis McGurn | 3
(Netherlands) | Patrick van Veldhoven | 2
(England) | Steve Douglas | 3
(England) | Brian Woods | 1
(England) | Stephen Bunting | 3
(England) | Dave Prins | 2
(England) | Phil Nixon | 1
(England) | Dave Chisnall | 3
(Netherlands) | Henri Klein | 0
(England) | Steve West | 3
(Norway) | Robert Wagner | 1
(Netherlands) | Joey ten Berge | 3
(Netherlands) | Jasper Smidt | 1
(England) | Martin Adams | 3

Round 3
(Netherlands) | Patrick Loos | 3
(England) | Scott Mitchell | 0
(Scotland) | Ross Montgomery | 3
(England) | Robbie Green | 2
(England) | Scott Waites | 3
(Netherlands) | Cor Ernst | 1
(Netherlands) | Benito van de Pas | 1
(England) | Paul Gibbs | 3
(Netherlands) | Edwin Max | 3
(England) | Lewis McGurn | 1
(England) | Steve Douglas | 3
(England) | Stephen Bunting | 1
(England) | Dave Chisnall | 1
(England) | Steve West | 3
(Netherlands) | Joey ten Berge | 1
(England) | Martin Adams | 3

QF
(Netherlands) | Patrick Loos | 0
(Scotland) | Ross Montgomery | 4
(England) | Scott Waites | 4
(England) | Paul Gibbs | 1
(Netherlands) | Edwin Max | 1
(England) | Steve Douglas | 4
(England) | Steve West | 1
(England) | Martin Adams | 4

SF
(Scotland) | Ross Montgomery | 0
(England) | Scott Waites | 2
(England) | Steve Douglas | 0
(England) | Martin Adams | 2

F
(England) | Scott Waites | 1
(England) | Martin Adams | 3
