= 2017 Dutch Open (darts) =

The 2017 Dutch Open was the 45th edition of the Dutch Open. Mark McGeeney won the men's tournament whilst Deta Hedman won the women's. Current BDO World Champion Glen Durrant did not compete in the tournament.

== Prize money ==
- Winner €5,000 (men), €2,250 (women)
- Runner-up €2,500 (men), €1,250 (women)
- Semi-finalist €1,250 (men), €750 (women)
- Quarter-finalist €500 (men), €250 (women)
- Last 16 €200 (men), €100 (women)
- Last 32 €100 (men)

== Last 32 – Men's draw ==
1st Round
(Netherlands) Sietse Lap	4
(Scotland) Craig Quinn	3
(Netherlands) Richard Huizinga	4
(Netherlands) Richard Kimmann	0
(Wales) Rhys Griffin	4
(Netherlands) Vincent van der Meer	2
(Netherlands) Wesley Harms	4
(England) Martin Atkins	3
(Netherlands) Martijn Kleermaker	4
(England) Rhys Hayden	2
(Netherlands) Willem Mandigers	4
(Netherlands) Toon Greebe	2
(Netherlands) Rick Hofstra	4
(Netherlands) Mark Schlaghecke	2
(England) Mark McGeeney	4
(Belgium) Andy Baetens	2
(Wales) Dean Reynolds	4
(Belgium) Svens Wens	2
(Belgium) Kenny Neyens	4
(Netherlands) Rowdy Schoremans	3
(Scotland) Ross Montgomery	4
(Netherlands) Achmed Achmaddy	3
(England) Martin Adams	4
(Belgium) Davy Van Baelen	3
(Wales) Richie Edwards	4
(England) Darryl Fitton	3
(Netherlands) Davy van der Zanden	4
(Netherlands) Kevin Wensink	2
(Netherlands) Justin van Tergouw	4
(Netherlands) Patrick Slor	2
(England) Scott Mitchell	4
(England) Stephen Rose	2

2nd Round
(Netherlands) Richard Huizinga	4
(Netherlands) Sietse Lap	3
(Wales) Rhys Griffin	4
(Netherlands) Wesley Harms	3
(Netherlands) Willem Mandigers	4
(Netherlands) Martijn Kleermaker	2
(England) Mark McGeeney	4
(Netherlands) Rick Hofstra	2
(Wales) Dean Reynolds	4
(Belgium) Kenny Neyens	1
(Scotland) Ross Montgomery	4
(England) Martin Adams	3
(Wales) Richie Edwards	4
(Netherlands) Davy van der Zanden	2
(England) Scott Mitchell	4
(Netherlands) Justin van Tergouw	0

Quarterfinals
(Wales) Rhys Griffin	5
(Netherlands) Richard Huizinga	2
(England) Mark McGeeney	5
(Netherlands) Willem Mandigers	3
(Scotland) Ross Montgomery	5
(Wales) Dean Reynolds	4
(England) Scott Mitchell	5
(Wales) Richie Edwards	3

Semifinals
(England) Mark McGeeney 98.04	2
(Wales) Rhys Griffin 92.13	1
(Scotland) Ross Montgomery 87.72	2
(England) Scott Mitchell 85.62	0

Finals
1	(England) Mark McGeeney 84.87	3
(Scotland) Ross Montgomery 85.32	1

== Women's draw ==
First round
(England) Deta Hedman	4
(England) Danielle Ashton	0
(Netherlands) Anca Zijlstra	4
(England) Paula Jacklin	3
(England) Trina Gulliver	4
(Wales) Sue Edwards	3
(England) Lorraine Winstanley	4
(England) Sue Cuswick	0
6	(Netherlands) Aileen de Graaf	4
(Netherlands) Karin Krappen	1
(Netherlands) Sharon Prins	4
(Netherlands) Patricia Rudolph	0
(Wales) Rhian Griffiths	4
(Netherlands) Marjolein Noijens	3
(England) Lisa Ashton	4
(England) Bianca Los	0

Quarter-finals
(England) Deta Hedman	4
(Netherlands) Anca Zijlstra	0
(England) Lorraine Winstanley	4
(England) Trina Gulliver	1
(Netherlands) Sharon Prins	4
(Netherlands) Aileen de Graaf	2
(England) Lisa Ashton	4
(Wales) Rhian Griffiths	2

Semi-finals
(England) Deta Hedman	4
(England) Lorraine Winstanley	1
(England) Lisa Ashton	4
(Netherlands) Sharon Prins	2

Final
(England) Deta Hedman	5
(England) Lisa Ashton	4
