= Darts in the Netherlands =

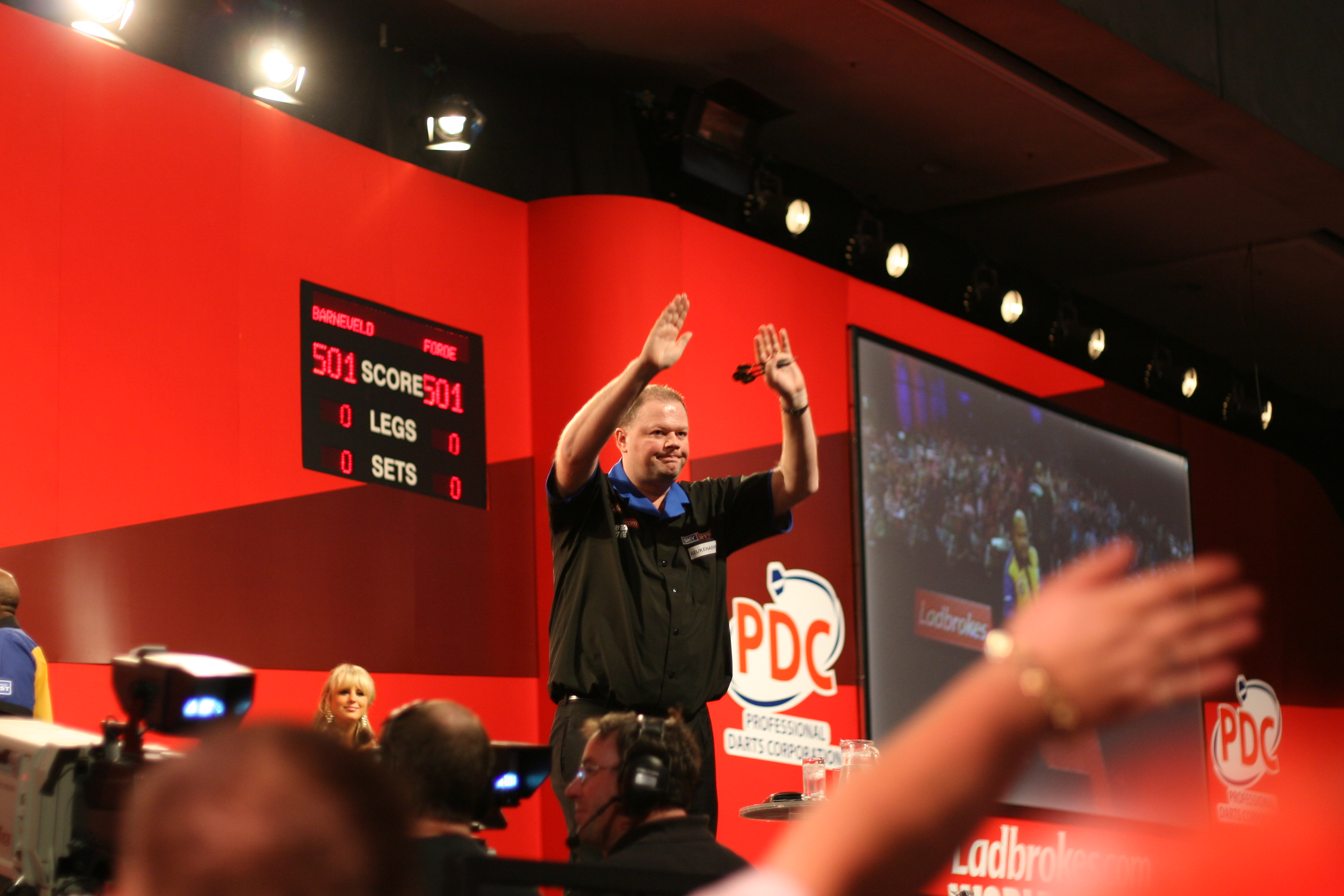
- Raymond van Barneveld, one of the most successful darts players in history
- Country: The Netherlands
- Governing body: Nederlandse Darts Bond (NDB)
- National team: n/a
- First played: 1973; 53 years ago
- Registered players: 33,000
- Clubs: 25 membership organisations

Darts is a competitive sport that is widely played in the Netherlands, with the first major tournament held in 1973, which has gained popularity in the country since the late 1990s

== History ==
Darts in the Netherlands is regulated by the Nederlandse Darts Bond (NDB or Dutch Darts Association) which was founded in 1976 and has local branches throughout the Netherlands. After this time several local leagues were founded.

To unify darts in the Netherlands, the Nederlandse Darts Federatie (NDF or Dutch Darts Federation) came into existence in July 1989 of which the local branches became members. The federation started out with 12 membership organisations (the original local branches) which together had roughly 7,000 members.

In February 2005 the NDF was amalgamated into the association.

The first Dutch darter to appear at a world darts championship was Bert Vlaardingerbroek, who appeared at the 1988 Embassy World Darts Championship.

When Raymond van Barneveld (who first played in the finals in 1995) won the 1998 Embassy World Darts Championship at Lakeside darts was fully put on the map in the Netherlands.

== Activities ==
As of 2023 the NDB has 25 membership organisations and the total membership is about 33,000.

The association organises two national competitions, the LaCo (Landelijke Competitie or National Competition) and the SuperLeague. There are cup and division competitions, youth competitions, a national ranking circuit and international competitions such as the Dutch Open and the association selects competitors to international events abroad.

The NDB is a member of the World Darts Federation and is one of the largest leagues after the English darts association.

== Tournaments held in the Netherlands ==
- Dutch Open (1973–currently)
- Finder Darts Masters (1995–2018)
- World Darts Trophy (2002–2007)
- International Darts League (2003–2007)
- Masters of Darts (2005–2007)

== List of Dutch darts world champions ==
- Raymond van Barneveld – Most successful Dutch darts player ever with five world championships, four at the BDO and one at the PDC
- Michael van Gerwen – Winner of three world titles, all at the PDC
- Jelle Klaasen – Youngest world champion ever with one BDO world title
- Christian Kist – Third Dutchman to win at the BDO

== Other Dutch darts players ==
- See: Category:Dutch darts players
