= Professional Association of Visual Artists =

The Professional Association of Visual Artists (Dutch: Beroepsvereniging van Beeldende Kunstenaars, BBK) is a national organization headquartered in Amsterdam, founded on May 15, 1945, to defend the interests of professional visual artists. The organization, which strives to increase municipal art ownership and presents itself as a union for artists, currently has about 2,000 members.

== History ==
The Professional Association of Visual Artists (BBK) has an eventful history of collaborations, divestitures and mergers. To begin with, the professional association was founded in October 1945 by artists from the Anti-Fascist Committee of Artists, the Union of Artists in Defense of Culture and the Socialist Artists Circle. Jelle Troelstra was chosen as the first president. The association was based in Amsterdam, and set itself to do:

... to act as a union for all visual artists, to promote the development and practice of the visual arts and to defend and promote both the common and material interests of the professional group as a whole and of the individual artist.

In 1946, the BBK co-founded the established Federation of Artists' Associations, initially forming by far the largest group in it. Over the years, four regional divisions were established: BBK Drente, BBK Friesland, BBK Groningen and BBK Rijnmond.

Partly due to the efforts of the BBK, politicians took notice of the situation of artists, and in 1949 a national scheme Social Assistance for Visual Artists (SBBK), also known as Contraprestatie, came into being. This resulted in the Fine Artists Scheme.

By the 1970s, the Professional Association of Fine Artists was known as the main private organization of art craftsmen. They were politically active, organizing various protest actions to call attention to the approximate social status of artists.

In 1994, a planned merger between the Beroepsvereniging Beeldende Kunstenaars (BBK) and the visual arts section of The Arts Union of the FNV (FNV Kiem), failed at the last minute. During this time, the BBK worked to improve and preserve the BKR. It collaborated on the creation of the Artists' Income Provision Act (WIK) and the Work and Income of Artists Act (Wwik), and then worked to preserve these provisions.

== Publications ==
Teunis Ĳdens (1994). "From artists' resistance to political union: On the development of the BBK in the period 1945-1973." In: Bulletin Dutch Workers' Movement (1994), pp. 81–95
