= British International Championships (darts) =

Tournament information
- Established: 1979
- Organisation(s): British Darts Organisation
- Month(s) Played: April

Current champion(s)
- England (men); England (women)

The British International Championships was a darts team competition run under the auspices of the British Darts Organisation. It is contested for by the nations of England, Scotland and Wales.

== History ==
First held in 1979, with separate events for both men and women, the championships are an annual contest between the home countries of England, Scotland and Wales. Although, no tournament was held in 1989. The championship's points scoring system has changed several times. The competition must not be staged in the same country that is hosting that years annual Six Nations Cup. The national darts organisation of the host country will organise that years competition. TV coverage was provided by ITV from 1979 to 1988 then BSB's/BSkyB's The Sports Channel/Sky Sports from 1990 to 1992

== Final standings ==
=== Men's event ===
Year	Winners		Runners-up		Third place	
Year	Nation	Points	Nation	Points	Nation	Points
1979	England	25	Wales	19	Scotland	7
1980	England	27	Wales	14	Scotland	10
1981	England (19) / Wales (19)				Scotland	13
1982	England	25	Scotland	15	Wales	11
1983	England	25	Wales	17	Scotland	9
1984	England	23	Wales	17	Scotland	11
1985	England	2	Wales	1	Scotland	0
1986	England	2	Scotland	1	Wales	0
1987	England	2	Scotland	1	Wales	0
1988	England	2	Scotland	1	Wales	0
1989	No Event					
1990	England	4	Wales	1	Scotland	1
1991	England	4	Scotland	2	Wales	0
1992	England	4	Scotland	2	Wales	0
1993	England	4	Scotland	1	Wales	1
1994	England	4	Wales	2	Scotland	0
1995	England	4	Wales	1	Scotland	1
1996	England	3	Scotland	3	Wales	0
1997	England	4	Wales	2	Scotland	0
1998	England	4	Scotland	1	Wales	1
1999	England	4	Scotland	2	Wales	0
2000	Scotland	3	England	2	Wales	1
2001	England	4	Wales	1	Scotland	1
2002	England	4	Scotland	2	Wales	0
2003	England	4	Scotland	2	Wales	0
2004	England	4	Wales	2	Scotland	0
2005	England	3	Scotland	3	Wales	0
2006	England	3	Scotland	3	Wales	0
2007	England	3	Wales	3	Scotland	0
2008	Scotland	3	Wales	2	England	1
2009	England	4	Scotland	2	Wales	0
2010	England	4	Wales	2	Scotland	0
2011	England	4	Scotland	2	Wales	0
2012	England	4	Wales	2	Scotland	0
2013	England	4	Scotland	2	Wales	0
2014	England	4	Scotland	2	Wales	0
2015	England	3	Scotland	3	Wales	0
2016	Wales	3	Scotland	2	England	1
2017	England	4	Scotland	2	Wales	0
2018	England	4	Scotland	2	Wales	0
2019	England	3	Wales	2	Scotland	1

=== Women's event ===
Year	Winners		Runners-up		Third place	
Year	Nation	Points	Nation	Points	Nation	Points
1979	England	10	Wales	7	Scotland	1
1980	England	11	Wales	6	Scotland	1
1981	Scotland	8	England	6	Wales	4
1982	England	10	Wales	6	Scotland	4
1983	England	9	Scotland	6	Wales	3
1984	England	8	Wales	7	Scotland	3
1985	England	1	Wales	1	Scotland	1
1986	Scotland (1) / Wales (1)				England	1
1987	England	2	Scotland	1	Wales	0
1988	England	2	Wales	1	Scotland	0
1989	No Event					
1990	England	3	Wales	2	Scotland	1
1991	Wales	3	England	3	Scotland	0
1992	Wales	4	England	2	Scotland	0
1993	England	3	Wales	2	Scotland	1
1994	Wales	3	Scotland	2	England	1
1995	England	4	Wales	2	Scotland	0
1996	England	3	Scotland	2	Wales	1
1997	Wales	3	England	3	Scotland	0
1998	Scotland	3	England	2	Wales	1
1999	England	3	Wales	2	Scotland	1
2000	England	3	Wales	2	Scotland	1
2001	England	4	Scotland	2	Wales	0
2002	England	4	Wales	2	Scotland	0
2003	England	4	Wales	2	Scotland	0
2004	England	4	Wales	1	Scotland	1
2005	England	4	Wales	2	Scotland	0
2006	Englandf	3	Wales	2	Scotland	1
2007	England	4	Wales	1	Scotland	1
2008	England	3	Wales	2	Scotland	1
2009	Wales	4	England	2	Scotland	0
2010	England	4	Scotland	2	Wales	0
2011	England	4	Wales	2	Scotland	0
2012	England	4	Wales	2	Scotland	0
2013	England	4	Wales	2	Scotland	0
2014	England	4	Wales	2	Scotland	0
2015	England	4	Wales	2	Scotland	0
