= 2007 World Masters (darts) =

Winmau World Masters

Tournament information
- Dates: 16–18 November 2007
- Venue: Leisure World, Bridlington
- Location: East Riding of Yorkshire, England
- Country: England
- Organisation(s): BDO
- Format: Sets (best of 3 legs) for men, Legs for women, boys and girls Finals: best of 13 (men's)
- Prize fund: £50,000
- Winner's share: £25,000 (men's)
- Nine-dart finish: (England) John Walton
- High checkout: 170 (England) John Walton (England) Darryl Fitton

Champion(s)
- (Scotland) Robert Thornton (men) (Netherlands) Karin Krappen (women) (England) Shaun Griffiths (boys) (Wales) Kimberley Lewis (girls)

The 2007 Winmau World Masters was a darts tournament being staged by the British Darts Organisation at Leisure World in Bridlington between 16–18 November 2007. It also featured a qualifying event for the 2008 Lakeside World Professional Championship.

History was made by John Walton who became the first player to hit a perfect nine-dart finish in the televised stage of the tournament. The event was broadcast by the BBC. However, the nine-darter was not shown live as it was achieved in the last 16 before their live coverage began.

Michael van Gerwen was unable to defend his title, as he had decided to switch to the rival organisation, the Professional Darts Corporation - thereby making himself ineligible under the BDO's rules.

Scotland's Robert Thornton surprised the field by beating Co Stompé, BDO world champion Martin Adams, Martin Atkins and Darryl Fitton to win the title and seal a qualifying place for the 2008 BDO World Championship.

== Controversy ==
Controversy hit the tournament in May when it was confirmed by the British Darts Organisation that the Winmau World Masters had been moved from its original dates of 26–28 October to a new date of 16–18 November clashing directly with the Grand Slam of Darts - a new tournament which was hoping to feature the top players from both darting organisations - the BDO and PDC.

This meant that players from the BDO were forced into a direct choice between competing at the Masters for valuable ranking points or taking their place at the Grand Slam for better prize money. BDO World Champion Martin Adams almost immediately confirmed that he would participate in the Masters. The other top BDO players who had qualified, including Gary Anderson, Scott Waites and Mark Webster competed at the Grand Slam and missed the Masters.

Adams plus the next seven highest ranked BDO players who hadn't qualified for the Grand Slam were later given seeding positions through to the BBC televised stages of the tournament for the first time.

== 2007 Men's Event results ==
- Each set is best of 3 legs.

Last 16; Best of 5 sets Losers £10,000
1 | (England) Martin Adams 93.63 | 3
(England) Stuart Kellett 86.19 | 1
8 | (Netherlands) Co Stompé 95.25 | 1
(Scotland) Robert Thornton 96.78 | 3
5 | (England) Ted Hankey 86.79 | 3
(Netherlands) Edwin Max 86.10 | 0
4 | (England) Martin Atkins 88.68 | 3
(Scotland) Ross Montgomery 78.93 | 1
2 | (England) Tony O'Shea 84.78 | 3
(England) Paul Gibbs 81.63 | 0
7 | (England) John Walton 89.25 | 3
(Wales) Martin Phillips 80.76 | 1
6 | (England) Darryl Fitton 95.70 | 3
(Finland) Jarkko Komula 89.88 | 2
3 | (England) Gary Robson 82.17 | 0
(Australia) Simon Whitlock 94.11 | 3

Quarter-finals; Best of 5 sets Losers £35,000
1 | (England) Adams 95.13 | 1
(Scotland) Thornton 97.41 | 3
5 | (England) Hankey 88.35 | 2
4 | (England) Atkins 94.83 | 3
2 | (England) O'Shea 91.62 | 1
7 | (England) Walton 96.21 | 3
6 | (England) Fitton 100.68 | 3
(Australia) Whitlock 91.02 | 0

Semi-finals; Best of 11 sets Losers £150,000
(Scotland) Thornton 97.17 | 6
4 | (England) Atkins 94.23 | 1
7 | (England) Walton 88.02 | 5
6 | (England) Fitton 91.56 | 6

Final; Best of 13 sets Winner £250,000; Runner-up £125,000
(Scotland) Thornton 94.26 | 7
6 | (England) Fitton 95.28 | 5

- Highest tournament averages: Robert Thornton 96.41; Darryl Fitton 95.81; Co Stompé 95.25; Martin Adams 94.28

== 2007 Women's Event results ==
- Semi-finals (best of 7 legs)

Karen Lawman (England) 4-3 Rilana Erades (Netherlands)
Karin Krappen (Netherlands) 4-2 Trina Gulliver (England)

- Final (best of 7 legs)

Karin Krappen (Netherlands) 4-3 Karen Lawman (England)

== 2007 Boy's Event results ==
- Semi-finals (best of 7 legs)

Shaun Griffiths (England) 4-1 David Coyne (Republic of Ireland)
Michael Smith (England) 4-2 Oskar Lukasiak (Sweden)

- Final (best of 7 legs)

Shaun Griffiths (England) 4-0 Michael Smith (England)

== 2007 Girl's Event results ==
- Semi-finals (best of 7 legs)

Kimberley Lewis (Wales) 4-0 Amy Chappell (England)
Lorraine Hyde (Scotland) 4-1 Linda Odén (Sweden)

- Final (best of 7 legs)

Kimberley Lewis (Wales) 4-2 Lorraine Hyde (Scotland)

== See also ==
- Winmau World Masters - history of the event
