= BDO International Open =

Tournament information
- Country: (United Kingdom) Great Britain
- Established: 2008
- Organisation(s): BDO category A / WDF category 2
- Format: Legs
- Prize fund: £7,600
- Final Year: 2018

Final champion(s)
- Jim Williams (men's); Anastasia Dobromyslova (women's)

The BDO International Open was a darts tournament that has been held annually since 2008.

== List of tournaments ==
=== Men's ===
| Year | Champion | Score | Runner-up | Total Prize Money | Champion | Runner-up |
|---|---|---|---|---|---|---|
| 2008 | (England) Davy Richardson | 4-1 | (Scotland) Ross Montgomery | £3,540 | £3,000 | £700 |
| 2009 | (England) Tony O'Shea | 4-0 | (England) Ted Hankey | £3,540 | £2,000 | £600 |
| 2010 | (England) Martin Adams | 4-1 | (England) Gary Robson | £4,640 | £3,000 | £700 |
| 2011 | (Netherlands) Wesley Harms | 4-2 | (England) Stephen Bunting | £5,100 | £3,000 | £800 |
| 2012 | (Wales) Wayne Warren | 5-1 | (England) Richie George | £7,600 | £3,000 | £1,200 |
| 2013 | (Netherlands) Jan Dekker | 6-3 | (England) Scott Waites | £7,600 | £3,000 | £1,200 |
| 2014 | (England) Martin Adams (2) | 6-4 | Tony O'Shea | £7,600 | £3,000 | £1,200 |
| 2015 | (England) Martin Atkins | 6-2 | (Wales) Martin Phillips | £7,600 | £3,000 | £1,200 |
| 2016 | Nick Kenny (88.35) | 6-5 | Tony O'Shea (87.45) | £7,600 | £3,000 | £1,200 |
| 2017 | James Hurrell (98.88) | 6-3 | Scott Mitchell (94.02) | £7,600 | £3,000 | £1,200 |
| 2018 | Jim Williams (97.35) | 6–3 | Scott Baker (97.32) | £7,600 | £3,000 | £1,200 |

== Tournament records ==
- Most wins 2: (England) Martin Adams.
- Most Finals 2: (England) Martin Adams, (England) Tony O'Shea.
- Most Semi Finals 2: (England) Martin Adams, (England) Tony O'Shea, (England) Garry Thompson, (Scotland) Mark Barilli
- Most Quarter Finals 4: (England) Scott Mitchell.
- Most Appearances 7: (England) Martin Adams, (Scotland) Ross Montgomery, (England) Scott Mitchell, (England) Gary Robson.
- Most Prize Money won £6,150: (England) Martin Adams.
- Best winning average () : v.
- Youngest Winner age 22: (Netherlands) Jan Dekker.
- Oldest Winner age 58: (England) Martin Adams.
