= Dutch Open (darts) =

Tournament information
- Venue: De Bonte Wever
- Location: Assen, Netherlands
- Established: 1973
- Organisation(s): World Darts Federation
- Format: Legs and Sets
- Prize fund: €27,600 (open) €9,340 (women's) €500 (open youth) €305 (girl's)

Current champion(s)
- Paul Krohne (GER) (open); Priscilla Steenbergen (NED) (women's); Milan Vanuytrecht (BEL) (open U18); Eric Petereit (GER) (open U14); Paige Pauling (ENG) (girl's)

The Dutch Open is an annual darts tournament that is amongst the longest-running darts tournaments in the world, having started back in 1973. The popularity of darts in the Netherlands since Raymond van Barneveld began amassing world titles has seen the number of entries for the tournament rise dramatically. The 2007 event had 2,867 entries in the Men's Singles, 1,179 in the Men's Pairs, 418 in the Women's Singles and 176 in the Women's Pairs.

The 2002 version of the tournament saw the first live nine dart finish during the final between Shaun Greatbatch and Steve Coote. Greatbatch checked out using T20, T15, D18 during the third leg of the second set, The tournament has been covered by Dutch SBS6 television in recent years, and also by Eurosport across Europe.

From 2002 to 2013 the tournament was held at NH Conference Centre Koningshof, Veldhoven but since 2014 the tournament has been held at De Bonte Wever in Assen.

The 2023 event was streamed live on the final day by RTL 7 in the Netherlands.

== Dutch Open finals ==
=== Men's ===
Year	Champion	Av.	Score	Runner-Up	Av.	Prize Money			Venue
Year	Champion	Av.	Score	Runner-Up	Av.	Total	Ch.	R.-Up	Venue
1973	(Netherlands) Ton Koster	n/a	beat	(Netherlands) Geoff Kirkman	n/a	n/a	n/a	n/a	
1974	(Netherlands) Mary de Knoop	n/a	beat	(Netherlands) Bill Ratz	n/a	n/a	n/a	n/a	
1975	(England) Terry Henney	n/a	beat	(Netherlands) Sonja Durinck	n/a	n/a	n/a	n/a	
1976	(Netherlands) Henk van Tuijl	n/a	beat	(Netherlands) Arthur Russel	n/a	n/a	n/a	n/a	
1977	(Netherlands) Peter Smith	n/a	beat	(Netherlands) Jim Clarke	n/a	n/a	n/a	n/a	
1978	(Scotland) Jimmy Cox	n/a	beat	(Belgium) Daniel Serie	n/a	n/a	n/a	n/a	
1979	(Belgium) Daniel Serie	n/a	beat	(Scotland) Jimmy Cox	n/a	n/a	n/a	n/a	
1980	(Netherlands) Brian Fenby	n/a	beat	(England) Tony Sontag	n/a	n/a	n/a	n/a	
1981	(England) Gordon Watson	n/a	beat	(Belgium) Daniel Serie	n/a	n/a	n/a	n/a	
1982	(Netherlands) Jilles Vermaat	n/a	beat	(Belgium) Patrick Bolle	n/a	n/a	n/a	n/a	
1983	(Belgium) Luc Marreel	n/a	beat	(Netherlands) Rick Daniels	n/a	n/a	n/a	n/a	
1984	(Belgium) Frans Devooght	n/a	4 – 2	(Belgium) Omer Bauwens	n/a	n/a	n/a	n/a	Congresgebouw, The Hague
1985	(Belgium) Frans Devooght (2)	n/a	5 – 2	(Belgium) Willy Logie	n/a	n/a	n/a	n/a	Hoeksteen, Amsterdam
1986	(England) Lee Topper	n/a	3 – 2	(Belgium) Frans Devooght	n/a	n/a	n/a	n/a	National Badminton Center, Nieuwegein
1987	(Belgium) Bob Renard	n/a	3 – 1	(England) Eric Bristow	n/a	n/a	n/a	n/a	National Badminton Center, Nieuwegein
1988	(United States) Steve Brown	n/a	3 – 1	(Belgium) Bob Renard	n/a	n/a	n/a	n/a	't Heem, Hattem
1989	(England) Alan Warriner	n/a	3 – 0	(Belgium) Erik Clarys	n/a	n/a	n/a	n/a	Flevohof, Harderwijk
1990	(Belgium) Leo Laurens	93.93	3 – 0	(England) Graham Miller	n/a	n/a	n/a	n/a	Flevohof, Harderwijk
1991	(Greece) Kosta Lavassas	n/a	3 – 2	(Denmark) Jann Hoffmann	n/a	n/a	n/a	n/a	Flevohof, Harderwijk
1992	(Belgium) Leo Laurens (2)	n/a	beat	(Netherlands) Paul Hoogenboom	n/a	n/a	n/a	n/a	Noordwijkerhout, Noordwijkerhout
1993	(England) Alan Warriner (2)	n/a	3 – 0	(Scotland) Jocky Wilson	n/a	n/a	n/a	n/a	Noordwijkerhout, Noordwijkerhout
1994	(Wales) Richie Burnett	n/a	3 – 0	(Scotland) Alan Brown	n/a	n/a	n/a	n/a	Noordwijkerhout, Noordwijkerhout
1995	(England) Steve Beaton	79.20	3 – 2	(England) Kevin Painter	78.90	n/a	n/a	n/a	Apart Hotel, Delden
1996	(England) Steve Beaton (2)	n/a	2 – 1	(England) Paul Williams	n/a	n/a	n/a	n/a	Apart Hotel, Delden
1997	(England) Mervyn King	n/a	3 – 1	(England) Andy Fordham	n/a	n/a	n/a	n/a	Apart Hotel, Delden
1998	(England) Alan Warriner (3)	92.61	3 – 0	(England) Peter Evison	80.07	n/a	n/a	n/a	Apart Hotel, Delden
1999	(England) Ted Hankey	n/a	4 – 2	(England) Robbie Widdows	n/a	n/a	n/a	n/a	Apart Hotel, Delden
2000	(England) Wayne Mardle	n/a	4 – 1	(England) Mervyn King	n/a	n/a	n/a	n/a	Bonte Wever, Slagharen
2001	(Netherlands) Raymond van Barneveld	n/a	4 – 0	(Germany) Andree Welge	n/a	n/a	n/a	n/a	Bonte Wever, Slagharen
2002	(England) Shaun Greatbatch	n/a	4 – 2	(England) Steve Coote	n/a	n/a	n/a	n/a	NH Conference Centre Koningshof, Veldhoven
2003	(England) Ted Hankey (2)	93.87	3 – 0	(Netherlands) Roland Scholten	81.87	€11,445	€3,630	€1,815	NH Conference Centre Koningshof, Veldhoven
2004	(Netherlands) Raymond van Barneveld (2)	98.73	3 – 0	(England) Gary Robson	71.22	€16,450	€4,500	€2,250	NH Conference Centre Koningshof, Veldhoven
2005	(England) Tony Eccles	n/a	3 – 0	(England) John Walton	n/a	€16,450	€4,500	€2,250	NH Conference Centre Koningshof, Veldhoven
2006	(Netherlands) Raymond van Barneveld (3)	n/a	3 – 2	(Scotland) Gary Anderson	n/a	€16,450	€4,500	€2,250	NH Conference Centre Koningshof, Veldhoven
2007	(England) Scott Waites	86.64	3 – 0	(England) Steve West	79.59	€16,450	€4,500	€2,250	NH Conference Centre Koningshof, Veldhoven
2008	(Scotland) Robert Thornton	92.52	3 – 0	(Belgium) Alain van Bouwel	84.24	€16,450	€4,500	€2,250	NH Conference Centre Koningshof, Veldhoven
2009	(England) Darryl Fitton	91.17	3 – 2	(Netherlands) Willy van de Wiel	88.05	€16,450	€4,500	€2,250	NH Conference Centre Koningshof, Veldhoven
2010	(England) Martin Adams	n/a	3 – 1	(England) Scott Waites	n/a	€16,450	€4,500	€2,250	NH Conference Centre Koningshof, Veldhoven
2011	(England) Martin Adams (2)	n/a	3 – 2	(England) Dean Winstanley	n/a	€16,450	€4,500	€2,250	NH Conference Centre Koningshof, Veldhoven
2012	(England) Tony O'Shea	n/a	3 – 0	(England) Dave Prins	n/a	€16,450	€4,500	€2,250	NH Conference Centre Koningshof, Veldhoven
2013	(England) Scott Waites (2)	n/a	3 – 2	(England) James Wilson	n/a	€18,400	€5,000	€2,500	NH Conference Centre Koningshof, Veldhoven
2014	(Scotland) Ross Montgomery	n/a	3 – 2	(England) Scott Waites	n/a	€18,400	€5,000	€2,500	De Bonte Wever, Assen
2015	(England) Martin Adams (3)	93.18	3 – 1	(England) Darryl Fitton	94.22	€33,350	€5,000	€2,500	De Bonte Wever, Assen
2016	(England) Martin Adams (4)	89.73	3 – 1	(Netherlands) Danny Noppert	90.13	€33,350	€5,000	€2,500	De Bonte Wever, Assen
2017	(England) Mark McGeeney	84.87	3 – 1	(Scotland) Ross Montgomery	85.32	€33,350	€5,000	€2,500	De Bonte Wever, Assen
2018	(England) Mark McGeeney (2)	98.07	3 – 1	(England) Glen Durrant	99.03	€33,350	€5,000	€2,500	De Bonte Wever, Assen
2019	(Netherlands) Richard Veenstra	n/a	3 – 2	(Scotland) Ryan Hogarth	n/a	€33,350	€5,000	€2,500	De Bonte Wever, Assen
2020	(Scotland) Ross Montgomery (2)	87.41	3 – 1	(Belgium) Brian Raman	88.08	€18,400	€5,000	€2,500	De Bonte Wever, Assen
2022	Jelle Klaasen	83.47	3 – 0	Mark Barilli	74.01	€18,400	€5,000	€2,500	De Bonte Wever, Assen
2023	Berry van Peer	88.29	3 – 1	Andy Baetens	86.62	€18,400	€5,000	€2,500	De Bonte Wever, Assen
2024	Jarno Bottenberg	84.44	3 – 2	Wesley Plaisier	84.78	€18,400	€5,000	€2,500	De Bonte Wever, Assen
2025	Jeffrey Sparidaans	83.05	3 – 0	David Fatum	79.50	€27,600	€6,000	€3,000	De Bonte Wever, Assen
2026	(Germany) Paul Krohne	89.01	3 – 2	Corné Groeneveld	88.88	€27,600	€6,000	€3,000	De Bonte Wever, Assen

=== Women's ===
Year	Champion	Av.	Score	Runner-Up	Av.	Prize Money			Venue
Year	Champion	Av.	Score	Runner-Up	Av.	Total	Ch.	R.-Up	Venue
1984	(Netherlands) Johanna Schipper	n/a	beat	(Netherlands) Eelkje Vos	n/a	n/a	n/a	n/a	Congresgebouw, The Hague
1985	(Netherlands) Josefien Hendriksen	n/a	beat	(Netherlands) Patricia van Beek	n/a	n/a	n/a	n/a	Hoeksteen, Amsterdam
1986	(England) Annabelle Long	n/a	beat	(England) Shirley Hall	n/a	n/a	n/a	n/a	National Badminton Center, Nieuwegein
1987	(Netherlands) Valerie Maytum	n/a	beat	(England) Tricia Wright	n/a	n/a	n/a	n/a	National Badminton Center, Nieuwegein
1988	(England) Sharon Colclough	n/a	beat	(England) Lil Coombes	n/a	n/a	n/a	n/a	't Heem, Hattem
1989	(England) Joan Parmley	n/a	beat	(Netherlands) Sylvia Alders	n/a	n/a	n/a	n/a	Flevohof, Harderwijk
1990	(England) Sharon Colclough (2)	n/a	beat	(England) Jane Stubbs	n/a	n/a	n/a	n/a	Flevohof, Harderwijk
1991	(England) Mandy Solomons	n/a	beat	(England) Jane Stubbs	n/a	n/a	n/a	n/a	Flevohof, Harderwijk
1992	(England) Mandy Solomons (2)	n/a	beat	(England) Deta Hedman	n/a	n/a	n/a	n/a	Noordwijkerhout, Noordwijkerhout
1993	(England) Mandy Solomons (3)	n/a	beat	(England) Deta Hedman	n/a	n/a	n/a	n/a	Noordwijkerhout, Noordwijkerhout
1994	(Germany) Heike Jenkins	n/a	beat	(Netherlands) Valerie Maytum	n/a	n/a	n/a	n/a	Noordwijkerhout, Noordwijkerhout
1995	(Netherlands) Francis Hoenselaar	n/a	beat	(England) Deta Hedman	n/a	n/a	n/a	n/a	Apart Hotel, Delden
1996	(Netherlands) Francis Hoenselaar (2)	n/a	3 – 2	(England) Deta Hedman	n/a	n/a	n/a	n/a	Apart Hotel, Delden
1997	(Netherlands) Francis Hoenselaar (3)	n/a	3 – 0	(England) Trina Gulliver	n/a	n/a	n/a	n/a	Apart Hotel, Delden
1998	(Netherlands) Francis Hoenselaar (4)	n/a	3 – 0	(Sweden) Vicky Pruim	n/a	n/a	n/a	n/a	Apart Hotel, Delden
1999	(England) Trina Gulliver	n/a	3 – 2	(Netherlands) Francis Hoenselaar	n/a	n/a	n/a	n/a	Apart Hotel, Delden
2000	(Netherlands) Francis Hoenselaar (5)	n/a	3 – 1	(England) Trina Gulliver	n/a	n/a	n/a	n/a	Bonte Wever, Slagharen
2001	(Sweden) Vicky Pruim	n/a	3 – 0	(Sweden) Carina Ekberg	n/a	n/a	n/a	n/a	Bonte Wever, Slagharen
2002	(Netherlands) Francis Hoenselaar (6)	n/a	3 – 2	(England) Tricia Wright	n/a	n/a	n/a	n/a	NH Conference Centre Koningshof, Veldhoven
2003	(Belgium) Sandra Pollet	n/a	3 – 1	(Netherlands) Francis Hoenselaar	n/a	n/a	n/a	n/a	NH Conference Centre Koningshof, Veldhoven
2004	(Netherlands) Francis Hoenselaar (7)	n/a	3 – 1	(England) Trina Gulliver	n/a	n/a	n/a	n/a	NH Conference Centre Koningshof, Veldhoven
2005	(Russia) Anastasia Dobromyslova	n/a	3 – 1	(England) Clare Bywaters	n/a	n/a	n/a	n/a	NH Conference Centre Koningshof, Veldhoven
2006	(Scotland) Anne Kirk	n/a	3 – 2	(England) Trina Gulliver	n/a	n/a	n/a	n/a	NH Conference Centre Koningshof, Veldhoven
2007	(England) Trina Gulliver (2)	n/a	5 – 2	(England) Clare Bywaters	n/a	n/a	n/a	n/a	NH Conference Centre Koningshof, Veldhoven
2008	(Russia) Anastasia Dobromyslova (2)	n/a	5 – 2	(Netherlands) Carla Molema	n/a	n/a	n/a	n/a	NH Conference Centre Koningshof, Veldhoven
2009	(England) Trina Gulliver (3)	76.80	5 – 3	(Wales) Julie Gore	75.66	n/a	n/a	n/a	NH Conference Centre Koningshof, Veldhoven
2010	(England) Deta Hedman	n/a	5 – 4	(England) Trina Gulliver	n/a	n/a	n/a	n/a	NH Conference Centre Koningshof, Veldhoven
2011	(England) Trina Gulliver (4)	n/a	5 – 2	(Wales) Julie Gore	n/a	n/a	n/a	n/a	NH Conference Centre Koningshof, Veldhoven
2012	(Wales) Julie Gore	n/a	5 – 2	(England) Lorraine Winstanley	n/a	n/a	n/a	n/a	NH Conference Centre Koningshof, Veldhoven
2013	(England) Trina Gulliver (5)	n/a	5 – 3	(England) Lorraine Winstanley	n/a	€9,250	€2,500	€1,250	NH Conference Centre Koningshof, Veldhoven
2014	(Netherlands) Aileen de Graaf	n/a	5 – 4	(Russia) Anastasia Dobromyslova	n/a	€9,250	€2,500	€1,250	De Bonte Wever, Assen
2015	(Netherlands) Aileen de Graaf (2)	n/a	5 – 2	(England) Deta Hedman	n/a	€9,250	€2,500	€1,250	De Bonte Wever, Assen
2016	(England) Lisa Ashton	81.36	5 – 4	(England) Lorraine Winstanley	73.85	€9,250	€2,500	€1,250	De Bonte Wever, Assen
2017	(England) Deta Hedman (2)	n/a	5 – 4	(England) Lisa Ashton	n/a	€9,250	€2,500	€1,250	De Bonte Wever, Assen
2018	(England) Deta Hedman (3)	n/a	5 – 4	(Netherlands) Aileen de Graaf	n/a	€9,250	€2,500	€1,250	De Bonte Wever, Assen
2019	(Japan) Mikuru Suzuki	n/a	5 – 2	(Netherlands) Aileen de Graaf	n/a	€9,250	€2,500	€1,250	De Bonte Wever, Assen
2020	(Netherlands) Aileen de Graaf (3)	72.02	5 – 2	(Netherlands) Anca Zijlstra	68.46	€9,250	€2,500	€1,250	De Bonte Wever, Assen
2022	Beau Greaves	85.21	5 – 1	Rhian O'Sullivan	81.21	€9,250	€2,500	€1,250	De Bonte Wever, Assen
2023	Aileen de Graaf (4)	81.68	5 – 2	Beau Greaves	82.74	€9,250	€2,500	€1,250	De Bonte Wever, Assen
2024	Beau Greaves (2)	83.04	5 – 1	Aileen de Graaf	76.40	€9,250	€2,500	€1,250	De Bonte Wever, Assen
2025	Rhian O'Sullivan	73.46	5 – 2	Lerena Rietbergen	70.45	€9,340	€3,000	€1,250	De Bonte Wever, Assen
2026	Priscilla Steenbergen	78.39	5 – 3	Rachna David	69.89	€9,340	€3,000	€1,250	De Bonte Wever, Assen

=== Boys (U18) ===
Year	Champion	Av.	Score	Runner-up	Av.	Venue
2012	Rowby-John Rodriguez	n/a	4 – 0	Dimitri Van den Bergh	n/a	NH Conference Centre Koningshof, Veldhoven
2013	(Netherlands) Quin Wester	n/a	beat	(Netherlands) Colin Roelofs	n/a	NH Conference Centre Koningshof, Veldhoven
2014	(Netherlands) Mike van Duivenbode	n/a	beat	(Belgium) Brian Raman	n/a	De Bonte Wever, Assen
2015	(Netherlands) Maikel Verberk	n/a	beat	(Netherlands) Marvin van Velzen	n/a	De Bonte Wever, Assen
2016	(Netherlands) Maikel Verberk (2)	n/a	beat	(Netherlands) Justin van Tergouw	n/a	De Bonte Wever, Assen
2017	(Netherlands) Ian Spaans	n/a	beat	(Netherlands) Ramon Leferink	n/a	De Bonte Wever, Assen
2018	(Netherlands) Keanu van Velzen	n/a	beat	(Netherlands) Jurjen van der Velde	n/a	De Bonte Wever, Assen
2019	(Netherlands) Daan Bastiaansen	n/a	beat	(England) James Beeton	n/a	De Bonte Wever, Assen
2020	(Netherlands) Mark Tabak	63.06	4 – 1	(Netherlands) Marcel Bus	56.07	De Bonte Wever, Assen
2022	Dylan van Lierop	75.15	4 – 0	Sydnee de Vries	57.15	De Bonte Wever, Assen
2023	Sydnee de Vries	63.96	4 – 3	Mats Theobald	65.27	De Bonte Wever, Assen
2024	Ruben Baalmans	72.81	4 – 2	Cor Beukema	73.58	De Bonte Wever, Assen
2025	Bradley van der Velden	74.62	4 – 2	Oden Ollevier	67.04	De Bonte Wever, Assen
2026	(Belgium) Milan Vanuytrecht	73.59	4 – 3	(Netherlands) Kai Burger	78.21	De Bonte Wever, Assen

=== Girls ===
Year	Champion	Av.	Score	Runner-up	Av.	Venue
2012	(Belgium) Bauwke Verreydt	n/a	3 – 0	(Netherlands) Joyce Schuurman	n/a	NH Conference Centre Koningshof, Veldhoven
2013	(England) Casey Gallagher	n/a	beat	(Netherlands) Fenna Bouwman	n/a	NH Conference Centre Koningshof, Veldhoven
2014	(Denmark) Michelle Lindhardt	n/a	beat	(Netherlands) Sharon Jansen	n/a	De Bonte Wever, Assen
2015	(Denmark) Sofie-Jahn Bendorff	n/a	beat	(Netherlands) Cheyenne Reijers	n/a	De Bonte Wever, Assen
2016	(Netherlands) Priscilla Steenbergen	n/a	beat	(Netherlands) Kyana Frauenfelder	n/a	De Bonte Wever, Assen
2017	(Netherlands) Cheyenne Doddema	n/a	beat	(Netherlands) Layla Brussel	n/a	De Bonte Wever, Assen
2018	(Russia) Ksenia Klochek	75.15	3 – 0	(Netherlands) Lerena Rietbergen	61.00	De Bonte Wever, Assen
2019	(Netherlands) Layla Brussel	n/a	beat	(Netherlands) Rosanne van der Velde	n/a	De Bonte Wever, Assen
2020	(Netherlands) Lerena Rietbergen	46.78	4 – 1	(Netherlands) Layla Brussel	47.06	De Bonte Wever, Assen
2022	Roos van der Velde	51.44	3 – 2	Marlene Klupsch	50.68	De Bonte Wever, Assen
2023	Sophie McKinlay	50.31	3 – 2	Dorina Sipos	46.95	De Bonte Wever, Assen
2024	Paige Pauling	63.51	3 – 0	Kira Mertens	53.82	De Bonte Wever, Assen
2025	Paige Pauling (2)	n/a	3 – 0	Merve Hummel	n/a	De Bonte Wever, Assen
2026	Paige Pauling (3)	71.41	3 – 1	Zehra Gemi	65.33	De Bonte Wever, Assen

== Records and statistics ==
=== Tournament records ===
- Most wins 4: (England) Martin Adams.
- Most Finals 4: (England) Scott Waites, (England) Martin Adams.
- Most Semi Finals 8: (Netherlands) Raymond van Barneveld.
- Most Quarter Finals 10: (Netherlands) Raymond van Barneveld.
- Most Appearances 12: (Netherlands) Raymond van Barneveld.
- Most Prize Money won €15,620: (England) Martin Adams.
- Best winning average (106.35) : (England) Ted Hankey vs. (Netherlands) Raymond van Barneveld, 2003 Semi-Final.
- Youngest Winner age 25: (United States) Steve Brown.
- Oldest Winner age 58: (England) Martin Adams.
- Highest Boys (U18) average (78.21): Kai Burger (2026 final).

=== Nine-dart finishes ===
Player	Year (+ Round)	Method (single-in double-out)	Opponent	Result
(England) Shaun Greatbatch	2002, Final	3 x T20; 3 x T20; T20, T15, D18	(England) Steve Coote	4 – 2
(England) Darryl Fitton	2015, Final	3 x T20; 3 x T20; T20, T19, D12	(England) Martin Adams	1 – 3

== See also ==
- Darts in the Netherlands
